= 1982–83 Minnesota North Stars season =

National Hockey League team season

1982–83 Minnesota North Stars
- Division: 2nd Norris
- Conference: 3rd Campbell
- 1982–83 record: 40–24–16
- Home record: 23–6–11
- Road record: 17–18–5
- Goals for: 321
- Goals against: 290

Team information
- General manager: Lou Nanne
- Coach: Glen Sonmor; Murray Oliver
- Captain: Craig Hartsburg
- Alternate captains: None
- Arena: Met Center
- Average attendance: 14,485

Team leaders
- Goals: Dino Ciccarelli (37)
- Assists: Bobby Smith (53)
- Points: Neal Broten; Bobby Smith (77)
- Penalty minutes: Willi Plett (170)
- Plus/minus: Neal Broten (+25)
- Wins: Gilles Meloche (20)
- Goals against average: Gilles Meloche (3.57)

The 1982–83 Minnesota North Stars season was the North Stars' 16th season.

Coached by Glen Sonmor (22–12–9) and Murray Oliver (18–12–7), the team compiled a record of 40–24–16 for 96 points, to finish the regular season 2nd in the Norris Division. In the playoffs they won the division semi-finals 3–1 over the Toronto Maple Leafs, but lost the division finals 4–1 to the Chicago Black Hawks.

== Offseason ==
=== NHL draft ===
In the summer of 1982, General Manager Lou Nanne orchestrated one of the franchise's biggest moves ever, and landed a star in the making, by drafting highly coveted Brian Bellows. It paid immediate dividends, as he would score 35 goals in his rookie campaign, and helped the team to finish with 40 wins and 96 regular season points – both the most ever recorded in the 26 years the franchise was based in Minnesota. Once again, though, the North Stars fell in the playoffs to the pesky Denis Savard and Al Secord-led Chicago Black Hawks in the second round of the playoffs.

Round	#	Player	Nationality	College/junior/club team
1	2	Brian Bellows	Canada	Kitchener Rangers (OHL)
3	59	Wally Chapman	United States	Edina High School (USHS-MN)
4	80	Bob Rouse	Canada	Billings Bighorns (WHL)
4	81	Dusan Pasek	Czechoslovakia	Bratislava (Czechoslovakia)
5	101	Marty Wiitala	United States	Superior High School (USHS-WI)
6	122	Todd Carlile	United States	North St. Paul High School (USHS-MN)
7	143	Viktor Zhluktov	Soviet Union	Moscow CSKA (USSR)
8	164	Paul Miller	United States	Crookston High School (USHS-MN)
9	185	Pat Micheletti	United States	Hibbing High School (USHS-MN)
10	206	Arnold Kadlec	Czechoslovakia	Litvinov (Czechoslovakia)
11	227	Scott Knutson	United States	Warroad High School (USHS-MN)

== Regular season ==
=== Final standings ===
Norris Division
	GP	W	L	T	GF	GA	Pts
**Chicago Black Hawks**	80	47	23	10	338	268	104
**Minnesota North Stars**	80	40	24	16	321	290	96
**Toronto Maple Leafs**	80	28	40	12	293	330	68
**St. Louis Blues**	80	25	40	15	285	316	65
Detroit Red Wings	80	21	44	15	263	344	57

Note: GP = Games played, W = Wins, L = Losses, T = Ties, Pts = Points, GF = Goals for, GA = Goals against
Note: Teams that qualified for the playoffs are highlighted in bold.

=== Record vs. opponents ===
Norris Division record vs. opponents

==== Vs. Campbell Conference ====
**Vs. Norris Division**

1982–83 NHL records
Team	**CHI**	**DET**	**MIN**	**STL**	**TOR**	**Total**
Chicago	—	6−2	3−4−1	6−2	6−1−1	**21−9−2**
Detroit	2−6	—	0−6−2	1−5−2	4−4	**7−21−4**
Minnesota	4−3−1	6−0−2	—	3−0−5	3−5	**16−8−8**
St. Louis	2−6	5−1−2	0−3−5	—	3−3−2	**10−13−9**
Toronto	1−6−1	4−4	5−3	3−3−2	—	**13−16−3**

**Vs. Smythe Division**

1982–83 NHL records
Team	**CGY**	**EDM**	**LAK**	**VAN**	**WIN**	**Total**
Chicago	1−2	1−1−1	2−0−1	0−1−2	2−1	**6−5−4**
Detroit	1−2	1−2	0−1−2	1−1−1	0−3	**3−9−3**
Minnesota	1−1−1	1−2	2−1	2−0−1	3−0	**9−4−2**
St. Louis	1−2	0−2−1	2−1	0−3	1−2	**4−10−1**
Toronto	1−1−1	0−2−1	1−2	2−1	0−3	**4−9−2**

**Vs. Wales Conference**

**Vs. Adams Division**

1982–83 NHL records
Team	**BOS**	**BUF**	**HFD**	**MTL**	**QUE**	**Total**
Chicago	0−3	1−1−1	3−0	3−0	2−1	**9−5−1**
Detroit	0−3	1−1−1	3−0	0−1−2	1−1−1	**5−6−4**
Minnesota	0−3	2−0−1	2−0−1	0−3	1−2	**5−8−2**
St. Louis	0−3	1−2	2−1	0−2−1	1−1−1	**4−9−2**
Toronto	1−2	2−0−1	2−1	1−0−2	1−1−1	**7−4−4**

**Vs. Patrick Division**

1982–83 NHL records
Team	**NJD**	**NYI**	**NYR**	**PHI**	**PIT**	**WSH**	**Total**
Chicago	3−0	1−1−1	3−0	1−1−1	3−0	0−2−1	**11−4−3**
Detroit	1−1−1	2−0−1	0−2−1	0−3	2−0−1	1−2	**6−8−4**
Minnesota	3−0	2−0−1	1−2	1−1−1	2−0−1	1−1−1	**10−4−4**
St. Louis	2−0−1	1−2	0−2−1	0−3	3−0	1−1−1	**7−8−3**
Toronto	0−1−2	1−2	0−3	0−2−1	2−1	1−2	**4−11−3**

== Schedule and results ==
1982–83 regular season
October

Game	Result	Date	Score	Opponent	Record
1	W	October 6, 1982	5–4	@ Winnipeg Jets (1982–83)	1–0–0
2	T	October 8, 1982	3–3	Detroit Red Wings (1982–83)	1–0–1
3	W	October 9, 1982	6–3	@ St. Louis Blues (1982–83)	2–0–1
4	W	October 14, 1982	6–2	Toronto Maple Leafs (1982–83)	3–0–1
5	W	October 16, 1982	8–4	Calgary Flames (1982–83)	4–0–1
6	W	October 18, 1982	4–3	St. Louis Blues (1982–83)	5–0–1
7	L	October 20, 1982	2–5	@ Toronto Maple Leafs (1982–83)	5–1–1
8	W	October 23, 1982	3–1	@ Washington Capitals (1982–83)	6–1–1
9	L	October 24, 1982	2–4	@ New York Rangers (1982–83)	6–2–1
10	W	October 26, 1982	5–3	@ New Jersey Devils (1982–83)	7–2–1
11	W	October 28, 1982	7–3	Detroit Red Wings (1982–83)	8–2–1
12	W	October 30, 1982	3–2	Philadelphia Flyers (1982–83)	9–2–1

November

Game	Result	Date	Score	Opponent	Record
13	W	November 2, 1982	7–6	@ Hartford Whalers (1982–83)	10–2–1
14	L	November 4, 1982	3–8	@ Montreal Canadiens (1982–83)	10–3–1
15	L	November 6, 1982	1–4	@ Quebec Nordiques (1982–83)	10–4–1
16	L	November 9, 1982	2–3	Montreal Canadiens (1982–83)	10–5–1
17	W	November 11, 1982	2–0	New York Islanders (1982–83)	11–5–1
18	L	November 13, 1982	3–4	@ Toronto Maple Leafs (1982–83)	11–6–1
19	L	November 14, 1982	4–5	@ Chicago Black Hawks (1982–83)	11–7–1
20	W	November 16, 1982	8–3	@ Los Angeles Kings (1982–83)	12–7–1
21	W	November 18, 1982	2–1	Buffalo Sabres (1982–83)	13–7–1
22	W	November 20, 1982	5–1	New Jersey Devils (1982–83)	14–7–1
23	T	November 23, 1982	8–8	@ New York Islanders (1982–83)	14–7–2
24	L	November 24, 1982	5–8	@ New York Rangers (1982–83)	14–8–2
25	T	November 26, 1982	6–6	Pittsburgh Penguins (1982–83)	14–8–3
26	T	November 29, 1982	3–3	Calgary Flames (1982–83)	14–8–4

December

Game	Result	Date	Score	Opponent	Record
27	W	December 1, 1982	4–1	@ Detroit Red Wings (1982–83)	15–8–4
28	W	December 2, 1982	6–3	@ St. Louis Blues (1982–83)	16–8–4
29	W	December 4, 1982	4–1	Winnipeg Jets (1982–83)	17–8–4
30	W	December 9, 1982	9–6	Vancouver Canucks (1982–83)	18–8–4
31	W	December 11, 1982	5–4	Edmonton Oilers (1982–83)	19–8–4
32	T	December 14, 1982	3–3	Hartford Whalers (1982–83)	19–8–5
33	T	December 16, 1982	4–4	Washington Capitals (1982–83)	19–8–6
34	T	December 18, 1982	3–3	@ Vancouver Canucks (1982–83)	19–8–7
35	L	December 21, 1982	4–6	@ Calgary Flames (1982–83)	19–9–7
36	L	December 22, 1982	2–8	@ Edmonton Oilers (1982–83)	19–10–7
37	W	December 26, 1982	3–2	@ Winnipeg Jets (1982–83)	20–10–7
38	T	December 29, 1982	5–5	Detroit Red Wings (1982–83)	20–10–8
39	L	December 31, 1982	3–5	Boston Bruins (1982–83)	20–11–8

January

Game	Result	Date	Score	Opponent	Record
40	T	January 5, 1983	3–3	St. Louis Blues (1982–83)	20–11–9
41	W	January 8, 1983	4–1	Chicago Black Hawks (1982–83)	21–11–9
42	L	January 9, 1983	3–6	@ Chicago Black Hawks (1982–83)	21–12–9
43	W	January 12, 1983	7–0	@ Pittsburgh Penguins (1982–83)	22–12–9
44	W	January 13, 1983	2–1	Toronto Maple Leafs (1982–83)	23–12–9
45	L	January 15, 1983	4–10	Edmonton Oilers (1982–83)	23–13–9
46	L	January 17, 1983	3–4	@ Boston Bruins (1982–83)	23–14–9
47	W	January 19, 1983	3–2	Detroit Red Wings (1982–83)	24–14–9
48	W	January 22, 1983	7–2	Hartford Whalers (1982–83)	25–14–9
49	T	January 25, 1983	4–4	@ St. Louis Blues (1982–83)	25–14–10
50	T	January 27, 1983	3–3	St. Louis Blues (1982–83)	25–14–11
51	T	January 29, 1983	2–2	Philadelphia Flyers (1982–83)	25–14–12
52	W	January 31, 1983	4–2	@ Toronto Maple Leafs (1982–83)	26–14–12

February

Game	Result	Date	Score	Opponent	Record
53	T	February 2, 1983	2–2	@ Buffalo Sabres (1982–83)	26–14–13
54	L	February 3, 1983	1–3	@ Washington Capitals (1982–83)	26–15–13
55	W	February 5, 1983	4–2	@ New York Islanders (1982–83)	27–15–13
56	W	February 10, 1983	7–5	New York Rangers (1982–83)	28–15–13
57	W	February 12, 1983	5–4	Chicago Black Hawks (1982–83)	29–15–13
58	W	February 15, 1983	3–2	@ New Jersey Devils (1982–83)	30–15–13
59	W	February 17, 1983	6–3	Quebec Nordiques (1982–83)	31–15–13
60	L	February 19, 1983	2–6	Boston Bruins (1982–83)	31–16–13
61	W	February 22, 1983	3–2	@ Detroit Red Wings (1982–83)	32–16–13
62	L	February 23, 1983	2–3	Toronto Maple Leafs (1982–83)	32–17–13
63	T	February 26, 1983	4–4	Chicago Black Hawks (1982–83)	32–17–14
64	W	February 27, 1983	2–1	@ Chicago Black Hawks (1982–83)	33–17–14

March

Game	Result	Date	Score	Opponent	Record
65	T	March 2, 1983	4–4	St. Louis Blues (1982–83)	33–17–15
66	W	March 5, 1983	4–1	@ Detroit Red Wings (1982–83)	34–17–15
67	W	March 6, 1983	8–3	Los Angeles Kings (1982–83)	35–17–15
68	W	March 8, 1983	5–1	Buffalo Sabres (1982–83)	36–17–15
69	L	March 10, 1983	3–6	@ Philadelphia Flyers (1982–83)	36–18–15
70	L	March 12, 1983	3–6	@ Quebec Nordiques (1982–83)	36–19–15
71	W	March 14, 1983	6–3	Vancouver Canucks (1982–83)	37–19–15
72	W	March 16, 1983	3–2	Pittsburgh Penguins (1982–83)	38–19–15
73	T	March 19, 1983	3–3	@ St. Louis Blues (1982–83)	38–19–16
74	W	March 21, 1983	4–3	Chicago Black Hawks (1982–83)	39–19–16
75	L	March 23, 1983	3–6	@ Toronto Maple Leafs (1982–83)	39–20–16
76	L	March 24, 1983	3–5	@ Montreal Canadiens (1982–83)	39–21–16
77	W	March 26, 1983	7–5	@ Detroit Red Wings (1982–83)	40–21–16
78	L	March 29, 1983	2–4	Toronto Maple Leafs (1982–83)	40–22–16
79	L	March 30, 1983	0–5	@ Chicago Black Hawks (1982–83)	40–23–16

April

Game	Result	Date	Score	Opponent	Record
80	L	April 2, 1983	5–8	@ Los Angeles Kings (1982–83)	40–24–16

Legend: Win (2 points) Loss (0 points) Tie (1 point)

== Playoffs ==
1983 Stanley Cup playoffs
Norris Division Semifinals vs. (N3) Toronto Maple Leafs – North Stars win 3–1

Game	Date	Visitor	Score	Home	Series
1	April 6	Toronto Maple Leafs	4–5	Minnesota North Stars	1–0
2	April 7	Toronto Maple Leafs	4–5 (OT)	Minnesota North Stars	2–0
3	April 9	Minnesota North Stars	3–6	Toronto Maple Leafs	2–1
4	April 10	Minnesota North Stars	5–4 (OT)	Toronto Maple Leafs	3–1

Norris Division Finals vs. (N1) Chicago Black Hawks – Black Hawks win 4–1

Game	Date	Visitor	Score	Home	Series
1	April 14	Minnesota North Stars	2–5	Chicago Black Hawks	0–1
2	April 15	Minnesota North Stars	4–7	Chicago Black Hawks	0–2
3	April 17	Chicago Black Hawks	1–5	Minnesota North Stars	1–2
4	April 18	Chicago Black Hawks	4–3 (OT)	Minnesota North Stars	1–3
5	April 20	Minnesota North Stars	2–5	Chicago Black Hawks	1–4

Legend: Win Loss

== Player statistics ==
=== Skaters ===
Regular season
Player	GP	G	A	Pts	+/−	PIM
Neal Broten	79	32	45	77	25	43
Bobby Smith	77	24	53	77	–20	81
Tom McCarthy	80	28	48	76	19	59
Dino Ciccarelli	77	37	38	75	15	94
Steve Payne	80	30	39	69	–9	53
Brian Bellows	78	35	30	65	–11	27
Craig Hartsburg	78	12	50	62	6	109
Tim Young	70	18	35	53	–1	31
Gordie Roberts	80	3	41	44	20	103
Willi Plett	71	25	14	39	–12	170
Brad Maxwell	77	11	28	39	–2	157
Al MacAdam	73	11	22	33	3	60
Mike Eaves	75	16	16	32	–3	21
Jordy Douglas	68	13	14	27	–7	30
Curt Giles	76	2	21	23	11	70
George Ferguson^{†}	65	8	12	20	–1	14
Ron Friest	50	6	7	13	–4	150
Gary Sargent	18	3	6	9	5	5
Dan Mandich	67	3	4	7	–1	169
Ken Solheim^{‡}	25	2	4	6	0	4
Fred Barrett	51	1	3	4	–10	22
Warren Young	4	1	1	2	0	0
Total		321	531	852	—	1,472

Playoffs
Player	GP	G	A	Pts	+/−	PIM
Craig Hartsburg	9	3	8	11	–7	7
Brad Maxwell	9	5	6	11	–5	23
Bobby Smith	9	6	4	10	–4	17
Dino Ciccarelli	9	4	6	10	0	11
Brian Bellows	9	5	4	9	–8	18
Steve Payne	9	3	6	9	–7	19
Neal Broten	9	1	6	7	–4	10
Gordie Roberts	9	1	5	6	–3	14
Tom McCarthy	9	2	4	6	–3	9
Willi Plett	9	1	3	4	–1	38
George Ferguson	9	0	3	3	–1	4
Al MacAdam	9	2	1	3	0	2
Tim Young	2	0	2	2	0	2
Gary Sargent	5	0	2	2	0	0
Curt Giles	5	0	2	2	–2	6
Ron Friest	4	1	0	1	1	2
Total		34	62	96	—	182

=== Goaltending ===
Regular season
Player	GP	W	L	T	GA	SO
Gilles Meloche	47	20	13	11	160	1
Don Beaupre	36	19	10	5	120	0
Markus Mattsson^{‡}	2	1	1	0	6	1
Total		40	24	16	286	2

Playoffs
Player	GP	W	L	T	GA	SO
Gilles Meloche	5	2	3	0	18	0
Don Beaupre	4	2	2	0	20	0
Total		4	5	0	38	0

^{†}Denotes player spent time with another team before joining the North Stars. Stats reflect time with the North Stars only.
^{‡}Denotes player was traded mid-season. Stats reflect time with the North Stars only.
