= 1982–83 Washington Capitals season =

NHL hockey team season

1982–83 Washington Capitals
- Division: 3rd Patrick
- Conference: 5th Wales
- 1982–83 record: 39–25–16
- Home record: 22–12–6
- Road record: 17–13–10
- Goals for: 306
- Goals against: 283

Team information
- General manager: David Poile
- Coach: Bryan Murray
- Captain: Rod Langway
- Alternate captains: None
- Arena: Capital Centre

Team leaders
- Goals: Mike Gartner (38)
- Assists: Dennis Maruk (50)
- Points: Dennis Maruk (81)
- Penalty minutes: Randy Holt (275)
- Plus/minus: Glen Currie (+18)
- Wins: Al Jensen (22)
- Goals against average: Pat Riggin (3.36)

The 1982–83 Washington Capitals season was the Washington Capitals ninth season in the National Hockey League (NHL). They qualified for the playoffs for the very first time in franchise history after eight frustrating seasons.

== Regular season ==
=== Final standings ===
Patrick Division
	GP	W	L	T	GF	GA	Pts
**Philadelphia Flyers**	80	49	23	8	326	240	106
**New York Islanders**	80	42	26	12	302	226	96
**Washington Capitals**	80	39	25	16	306	283	94
**New York Rangers**	80	35	35	10	306	287	80
New Jersey Devils	80	17	49	14	230	338	48
Pittsburgh Penguins	80	18	53	9	250	394	45

Note: GP = Games played, W = Wins, L = Losses, T = Ties, Pts = Points, GF = Goals for, GA = Goals against
Note: Teams that qualified for the playoffs are highlighted in bold.

=== Record vs. opponents ===
Patrick Division record vs. opponents

==== Vs. Wales Conference ====
**Vs. Patrick Division**

1982–83 NHL records
Team	**NJD**	**NYI**	**NYR**	**PHI**	**PIT**	**WSH**	**Total**
New Jersey	—	0−7	3−3−1	2−5	3−1−3	0−6−1	8−22−5
N.Y. Islanders	7−0	—	4−3	1−4−2	5−2	4−2−1	21−11−3
N.Y. Rangers	3−3−1	3−4	—	3−4	5−1−1	3−3−1	17−15−3
Philadelphia	5−2	4−1−2	4−3	—	5−1−1	3−4	21−11−3
Pittsburgh	1−3−3	2−5	1−5−1	1–5–1	—	1−5−1	6−23−6
Washington	6−0−1	2−4−1	3−3−1	4–3	5–1–1	—	20−11−4

**Vs. Adams Division**

1982–83 NHL records
Team	**BOS**	**BUF**	**HFD**	**MTL**	**QUE**	**Total**
New Jersey	0−1−2	0−2−1	1−2	1−2	1−2	3−9−3
N.Y. Islanders	0−2−1	1−2	2−1	1−0−2	1−1−1	5−6−4
N.Y. Rangers	0−3	0−2−1	2−1	1−2	1−2	4−10−1
Philadelphia	0−2−1	1−2	2−1	1−2	3−0	7−7−1
Pittsburgh	1−2	1−1−1	3−0	1−2	0−3	6−8−1
Washington	3−0	0−3	2−0−1	0−1−2	1−1−1	6−5−4

==== Vs. Campbell Conference ====
**Vs. Norris Division**

1982–83 NHL records
Team	**CHI**	**DET**	**MIN**	**STL**	**TOR**	**Total**
New Jersey	0−3	1−1−1	0−3	0−2−1	1−0−2	2−9−4
N.Y. Islanders	1−1−1	0−2−1	0−2−1	2−1	2−1	5−7−3
N.Y. Rangers	0−3	2−0−1	2−1	2−0−1	3−0	9−4−2
Philadelphia	1−1−1	3−0	1−1−1	3−0	2−0−1	10−2−3
Pittsburgh	0−3	0−2−1	0−2−1	0−3	1−2	1−12−2
Washington	2−0−1	2−1	1−1−1	1−1−1	2−1	8−4−3

**Vs. Smythe Division**

1982–83 NHL records
Team	**CGY**	**EDM**	**LAK**	**VAN**	**WIN**	**Total**
New Jersey	1−2	0−3	1−2	1−0−2	1−2	4−9−2
N.Y. Islanders	2−0−1	3−0	3−0	2−1	1−1−1	11−2−2
N.Y. Rangers	2−0−1	0−3	1−1−1	1−1−1	1−1−1	5−6−4
Philadelphia	3−0	2−1	2−1	1−1−1	3−0	11−3−1
Pittsburgh	0−3	1−2	2−1	1−2	1−2	5−10−0
Washington	2−1	0−2−1	1−1−1	1−1−1	1−0−2	5−5−5

== Schedule and results ==
=== Regular season ===
1982–83 game log
October: 3–6–1 (home: 0–3–1; road: 3–3–0)

Game	Date Time (ET)	Visitor	Score	Home	Decision	Location	Attendance	Record	Points	Recap
1	October 6	Washington	5–4	NY Rangers	Riggin	Madison Square Garden	17,413	1–0–0	2	W1
2	October 9	Philadelphia	3–2	Washington	Riggin	Capital Centre	17,704	1–1–0	2	L1
3	October 10	Washington	4–6	Philadelphia	Moore	Spectrum	16,790	1–2–0	2	L2
4	October 13	Washington	5–3	Toronto	Parro	Maple Leaf Gardens	16,300	2–2–0	4	W1
5	October 16; 8:05 p.m. EDT	Buffalo	9–2	Washington	Parro	Capital Centre	13,710	2–3–0	4	L1
6	October 20; 7:35 p.m. EDT	Montreal	3–3	Washington	Parro	Capital Centre	12,849	2–3–1	5	T1
7	October 21; 8:05 p.m. EDT	Washington	3–6	NY Islanders	Riggin	Nassau Coliseum	14,633	2–4–1	5	L1
8	October 23; 8:05 p.m. EDT	Minnesota	3–1	Washington	Parro	Capital Centre	12,768	2–5–1	5	L2
9	October 27	Washington	5–7	Pittsburgh	Parro	Pittsburgh Civic Arena	6,916	2–6–1	5	L3
10	October 30	Washington	6–5	St. Louis	Riggin	Checkerdome	10,689	3–6–1	7	W1

November: 5–3–5 (home: 5–1–0; road: 5–2–4)

Game	Date Time (ET)	Visitor	Score	Home	Decision	Location	Attendance	Record	Points	Recap
11	November 3; 8:35 p.m. EST	Washington	3–3	Chicago	Riggin	Chicago Stadium	13,864	3–6–2	8	T1
12	November 5	St. Louis	4–3	Washington	Riggin	Capital Centre	14,337	3–7–2	8	L1
13	November 7; 7:05 p.m. EST	Hartford	2–6	Washington	Jensen	Capital Centre	12,816	4–7–2	10	W1
14	November 8; 7:45 p.m. EST	Washington	2–2	New Jersey	Riggin	Brendan Byrne Arena	10,273	4–7–3	11	T1
15	November 10; 7:35 p.m. EST	New Jersey	0–3	Washington	Jensen	Capital Centre	12,445	5–7–3	13	W1
16	November 13; 8:05 p.m. EST	NY Islanders	1–3	Washington	Jensen	Capital Centre	14,131	6–7–3	15	W2
17	November 16; 7:35 p.m. EST	Calgary	3–5	Washington	Riggin	Capital Centre	10,705	7–7–3	17	W3
18	November 19	Washington	3–3	Winnipeg	Jensen	Winnipeg Arena	11,555	7–7–4	18	T1
19	November 21	Washington	3–5	Vancouver	Riggin	Pacific Coliseum	12,154	7–8–4	18	L1
20	November 23; 9:35 p.m. EST	Washington	3–6	Calgary	Jensen	Stampede Corral	7,242	7–9–4	18	L2
21	November 24; 9:35 p.m. EST	Washington	3–3	Edmonton	Riggin	Northlands Coliseum	17,498	7–9–5	19	T1
22	November 26	Toronto	3–5	Washington	Jensen	Capital Centre	13,752	8–9–5	21	W1
23	November 28; 7:05 p.m. EST	NY Islanders	3–3	Washington	Jensen	Capital Centre	12,380	8–9–6	22	T1

December: 9–1–4 (home: 5–1–2; road: 4–0–2)

Game	Date Time (ET)	Visitor	Score	Home	Decision	Location	Attendance	Record	Points	Recap
24	December 2	Pittsburgh	4–5	Washington	Jensen	Capital Centre	8,827	9–9–6	24	W1
25	December 4; 8:05 p.m. EST	Chicago	2–4	Washington	Riggin	Capital Centre	10,885	10–9–6	26	W2
26	December 7	Winnipeg	3–3	Washington	Jensen	Capital Centre	8,612	10–9–7	27	L1
27	December 9; 7:35 p.m. EST	Washington	6–4	New Jersey	Riggin	Brendan Byrne Arena	9,123	11–9–7	29	W1
28	December 10	NY Rangers	4–4	Washington	Jensen	Capital Centre	12,551	11–9–8	30	T1
29	December 12; 7:05 p.m. EST	Boston	3–4	Washington	Riggin	Capital Centre	10,435	12–9–8	32	W1
30	December 14; 7:35 p.m. EST	Los Angeles	2–7	Washington	Jensen	Capital Centre	8,696	13–9–8	34	W2
31	December 16; 8:35 p.m. EST	Washington	4–4	Minnesota	Riggin	Met Center	12,340	13–9–9	35	T1
32	December 18	Washington	3–1	Pittsburgh	Jensen	Pittsburgh Civic Arena	8,250	14–9–9	37	W1
33	December 19	Washington	3–1	Philadelphia	Jensen	Spectrum	16,849	15–9–9	39	W2
34	December 23; 8:05 p.m. EST	Washington	5–1	NY Islanders	Jensen	Nassau Coliseum	15,230	16–9–9	41	W3
35	December 26	Philadelphia	6–3	Washington	Jensen	Capital Centre	18,130	16–10–9	41	L1
36	December 28	Pittsburgh	3–6	Washington	Jensen	Capital Centre	14,213	17–10–9	43	W1
37	December 30; 7:35 p.m. EST	Washington	4–4	Hartford	Riggin	Hartford Civic Center	11,385	17–10–10	44	T1

January: 7–6–2 (home: 3–5–0; road: 4–1–2)

Game	Date Time (ET)	Visitor	Score	Home	Decision	Location	Attendance	Record	Points	Recap
38	January 1	NY Rangers	7–2	Washington	Jensen	Capital Centre	13,766	17–11–10	44	L1
39	January 2	Washington	7–4	Quebec	Riggin	Quebec Coliseum	15,258	18–11–10	46	W1
40	January 5; 7:35 p.m. EST	Washington	5–2	Detroit	Jensen	Joe Louis Arena	11,676	19–11–10	48	W2
41	January 6	Toronto	3–1	Washington	Riggin	Capital Centre	10,801	19–12–10	48	L1
42	January 8	Washington	3–3	St. Louis	Jensen	Checkerdome	12,563	19–12–11	49	T1
43	January 11; 7:35 p.m. EST	Los Angeles	9–7	Washington	Riggin	Capital Centre	9,422	19–13–11	49	L1
44	January 14; 7:35 p.m. EST	Washington	2–3	Buffalo	Jensen	Buffalo Memorial Auditorium	11,646	19–14–11	49	L2
45	January 15; 8:05 p.m. EST	Buffalo	4–2	Washington	Jensen	Capital Centre	11,409	19–15–11	49	L3
46	January 18	Philadelphia	1–4	Washington	Jensen	Capital Centre	10,981	20–15–11	51	W1
47	January 19; 8:35 p.m. EST	Washington	6–4	Chicago	Jensen	Chicago Stadium	17,482	21–15–11	53	W2
48	January 21	Quebec	5–4	Washington	Jensen	Capital Centre	13,365	21–16–11	53	L1
49	January 23; 1:35 p.m. EST	New Jersey	1–3	Washington	Jensen	Capital Centre	8,839	22–16–11	55	W1
50	January 26	Washington	6–2	Pittsburgh	Riggin	Pittsburgh Civic Arena	5,209	23–16–11	57	W2
51	January 28	Pittsburgh	2–7	Washington	Riggin	Capital Centre	10,978	24–16–11	59	W3
52	January 29; 8:05 p.m. EST	Washington	3–3	Montreal	Jensen	Montreal Forum	16,835	24–16–12	60	T1

February: 6–4–2 (home: 4–0–0; road: 2–4–2)

Game	Date Time (ET)	Visitor	Score	Home	Decision	Location	Attendance	Record	Points	Recap
53	February 1; 7:35 p.m. EST	Detroit	2–5	Washington	Riggin	Capital Centre	9,314	25–16–12	62	W1
54	February 3; 7:35 p.m. EST	Minnesota	1–3	Washington	Jensen	Capital Centre	9,680	26–16–12	64	W2
55	February 5; 8:05 p.m. EST	New Jersey	4–5	Washington	Jensen	Capital Centre	13,150	27–16–12	66	W3
56	February 6	Washington	4–4	Quebec	Riggin	Quebec Coliseum	15,232	27–16–13	67	T1
35th All-Star Game in Uniondale, New York
57	February 10; 8:05 p.m. EST	Washington	3–8	NY Islanders	Jensen	Nassau Coliseum	15,055	27–17–13	67	L1
58	February 13	Winnipeg	1–6	Washington	Riggin	Capital Centre	9,582	28–17–13	69	W1
59	February 16	Washington	4–5	NY Rangers	Jensen	Madison Square Garden	17,414	28–18–13	69	L1
60	February 18	Washington	2–1	Vancouver	Riggin	Pacific Coliseum	15,183	29–18–13	71	W1
61	February 19; 10:35 p.m. EST	Washington	3–3	Los Angeles	Riggin	The Forum	14,087	29–18–14	72	T1
62	February 23; 9:35 p.m. EST	Washington	3–6	Edmonton	Jensen	Northlands Coliseum	17,498	29–19–14	72	L1
63	February 24; 9:35 p.m. EST	Washington	4–2	Calgary	Riggin	Stampede Corral	7,242	30–19–14	74	W1
64	February 26; 8:05 p.m. EST	Washington	1–4	Montreal	Riggin	Montreal Forum	16,988	30–20–14	74	L1

March: 8–4–2 (home: 4–2–2; road: 4–2–0)

Game	Date Time (ET)	Visitor	Score	Home	Decision	Location	Attendance	Record	Points	Recap
65	March 2; 7:35 p.m. EST	Edmonton	5–3	Washington	Riggin	Capital Centre	18,130	30–21–14	74	L2
66	March 3	Washington	4–3	NY Rangers	Jensen	Madison Square Garden	17,411	31–21–14	76	W1
67	March 5	Philadelphia	3–4	Washington	Jensen	Capital Centre	18,022	32–21–14	78	W2
68	March 8; 7:45 p.m. EST	Washington	5–4	New Jersey	Riggin	Brendan Byrne Arena	9,350	33–21–14	80	W3
69	March 12; 5:05 p.m. EST	Washington	2–6	NY Islanders	Jensen	Nassau Coliseum	15,230	33–22–14	80	L1
70	March 13; 1:35 p.m. EST	Boston	4–6	Washington	Jensen	Capital Centre	15,729	34–22–14	82	W1
71	March 16; 7:35 p.m. EST	Hartford	4–5	Washington	Jensen	Capital Centre	8,980	35–22–14	84	W2
72	March 17; 7:35 p.m. EST	Washington	2–1	Boston	Riggin	Boston Garden	13,179	36–22–14	86	W3
73	March 20	Washington	3–2	Philadelphia	Riggin	Spectrum	17,147	37–22–14	88	W4
74	March 23	Vancouver	1–1	Washington	Riggin	Capital Centre	11,401	37–22–15	89	T1
75	March 24; 7:35 p.m. EST	New Jersey	3–5	Washington	Jensen	Capital Centre	9,713	38–22–15	91	W1
76	March 26	Pittsburgh	4–4	Washington	Riggin	Capital Centre	13,775	38–22–16	92	T1
77	March 27	Washington	4–5	NY Rangers	Jensen	Madison Square Garden	17,391	38–23–16	92	L1
78	March 30; 7:35 p.m. EST	NY Islanders	7–1	Washington	Riggin	Capital Centre	17,848	38–24–16	92	L2

April: 1–1–0 (home: 1–0–0; road: 0–1–0)

Game	Date	Visitor	Score	Home	Decision	Location	Attendance	Record	Points	Recap
79	April 1; 7:35 p.m. EST	Washington	7–8	Detroit	Jensen	Joe Louis Arena	13,609	38–25–16	92	L3
80	April 3	NY Rangers	0–3	Washington	Jensen	Capital Centre	10,219	39–25–16	94	W1

Win (2 points) Loss (0 points) Tie (1 point)

=== Playoffs ===
1983 Stanley Cup playoffs
Patrick Division Semifinals vs. (P2) New York Islanders: N.Y. Islanders won 3–1

Game	Date Time (ET)	Visitor	Score	Home	OT	Decision	Location	Attendance	Series	Recap
1	April 6; 8:05 p.m. EST	Washington	2–5	NY Islanders		Riggin	Nassau Coliseum	15,230	Islanders lead 1–0	L1
2	April 7; 8:05 p.m. EST	Washington	4–2	NY Islanders		Jensen	Nassau Coliseum	15,150	Series tied 1–1	W1
3	April 9; 1:05 p.m. EST	NY Islanders	6–2	Washington		Jensen	Capital Centre	18,130	Islanders lead 2–1	L1
4	April 10; 7:05 p.m. EST	NY Islanders	6–3	Washington		Jensen	Capital Centre	18,130	Islanders win 3–1	L2

Win Loss

== Playoffs ==
In the first round of the playoffs, the Capitals lost to the Islanders 3 games to 1.

== Player statistics ==
=== Regular season ===
Scoring

Player	Pos	GP	G	A	Pts	PIM	+/-	PPG	SHG	GWG
Dennis Maruk	C	80	31	50	81	71	-21	12	0	2
Mike Gartner	RW	73	38	38	76	54	-2	10	1	3
Bobby Carpenter	C	80	32	37	69	64	0	14	0	4
Bengt-Ake Gustafsson	RW	67	22	42	64	16	9	2	0	4
Alan Haworth	C	74	23	27	50	34	-5	5	0	2
Milan Novy	C	73	18	30	48	16	1	3	0	3
Craig Laughlin	RW	75	17	27	44	41	-7	5	0	3
Bobby Gould	RW	80	22	18	40	43	16	0	0	6
Ken Houston	RW	71	25	14	39	93	-8	9	0	0
Glen Currie	C	68	11	28	39	20	18	0	0	2
Gaetan Duchesne	LW	77	18	19	37	52	15	0	1	6
Greg Theberge	D	70	8	28	36	20	-3	7	0	1
Rod Langway	D	80	3	29	32	75	0	1	0	0
Doug Jarvis	C	80	8	22	30	10	-12	0	1	0
Brian Engblom	D	73	5	22	27	59	-4	4	0	0
Scott Stevens	D	77	9	16	25	195	14	0	0	0
Timo Blomqvist	D	61	1	17	18	67	15	1	0	1
Chris Valentine	C	23	7	10	17	14	-2	1	0	1
Ted Bulley	LW	39	4	9	13	47	-3	0	0	1
Randy Holt	D	70	0	8	8	275	-7	0	0	0
Darren Veitch	D	10	0	8	8	0	-1	0	0	0
Paul MacKinnon	D	19	2	2	4	8	1	1	0	0
Torrie Robertson	LW	5	2	0	2	4	-2	0	0	0
Lee Norwood	D	8	0	1	1	14	-3	0	0	0
Eric Calder	D	1	0	0	0	0	0	0	0	0
Doug Hicks	D	6	0	0	0	7	-3	0	0	0
Al Jensen	G	40	0	0	0	6	0	0	0	0
Robbie Moore	G	1	0	0	0	0	0	0	0	0
Dave Parro	G	6	0	0	0	0	0	0	0	0
Pat Riggin	G	38	0	0	0	4	0	0	0	0

Goaltending

Player	MIN	GP	W	L	T	GA	GAA	SO
Al Jensen	2358	40	22	12	6	135	3.44	1
Pat Riggin	2161	38	16	9	9	121	3.36	0
Dave Parro	261	6	1	3	1	19	4.37	0
Robbie Moore	20	1	0	1	0	1	3.00	0
Team:	4800	80	39	25	16	276	3.45	1

=== Playoffs ===
Scoring

Player	Pos	GP	G	A	Pts	PIM	PPG	SHG	GWG
Bobby Gould	RW	4	5	0	5	4	1	0	1
Glen Currie	C	4	0	3	3	4	0	0	0
Gaetan Duchesne	LW	4	1	1	2	4	0	0	0
Dennis Maruk	C	4	1	1	2	2	0	0	0
Brian Engblom	D	4	0	2	2	2	0	0	0
Bobby Carpenter	C	4	1	0	1	2	0	0	0
Ken Houston	RW	4	1	0	1	4	0	0	0
Craig Laughlin	RW	4	1	0	1	0	0	0	0
Scott Stevens	D	4	1	0	1	26	0	0	0
Bengt-Ake Gustafsson	RW	4	0	1	1	4	0	0	0
Randy Holt	D	4	0	1	1	20	0	0	0
Doug Jarvis	C	4	0	1	1	0	0	0	0
Greg Theberge	D	4	0	1	1	0	0	0	0
Timo Blomqvist	D	3	0	0	0	16	0	0	0
Ted Bulley	LW	1	0	0	0	0	0	0	0
Mike Gartner	RW	4	0	0	0	4	0	0	0
Alan Haworth	C	4	0	0	0	2	0	0	0
Al Jensen	G	3	0	0	0	0	0	0	0
Rod Langway	D	4	0	0	0	0	0	0	0
Milan Novy	C	2	0	0	0	0	0	0	0
Pat Riggin	G	3	0	0	0	0	0	0	0
Chris Valentine	C	2	0	0	0	4	0	0	0

Goaltending

Player	MIN	GP	W	L	GA	GAA	SO
Al Jensen	139	3	1	2	10	4.32	0
Pat Riggin	101	3	0	1	8	4.75	0
Team:	240	4	1	3	18	4.50	0

Note: GP = Games played; G = Goals; A = Assists; Pts = Points; +/- = Plus/minus; PIM = Penalty minutes; PPG=Power-play goals; SHG=Short-handed goals; GWG=Game-winning goals
MIN=Minutes played; W = Wins; L = Losses; T = Ties; GA = Goals against; GAA = Goals against average; SO = Shutouts;

== Draft picks ==
Washington's draft picks at the 1982 NHL entry draft held at the Montreal Forum in Montreal.

Round	#	Player	Nationality	College/Junior/Club team (League)
1	5	Scott Stevens	Canada	Kitchener Rangers (OHL)
3	58	Milan Novy	Czechoslovakia	Kladno (Czechoslovakia)
5	89	Dean Evason	Canada	Kamloops Blazers (WHL)
6	110	Ed Kastelic	Canada	London Knights (OHL)
8	152	Wally Schreiber	Canada	Regina Pats (WHL)
9	173	Jamie Reeve	Canada	Saskatoon Blades (SJHL)
10	194	Juha Nurmi	Finland	Tampere Tappara (Finland)
11	215	Wayne Prestage	Canada	Seattle Breakers (WHL)
12	236	Jon Holden	Canada	Peterborough Petes (OHL)
12	247	Marco Kallas	United States	St. Louis Sting (NAJHL)

== See also ==
- 1982–83 NHL season
