= 1982–83 Vancouver Canucks season =

13th season in franchise history

1982–83 Vancouver Canucks
- Division: 3rd Smythe
- Conference: 5th Campbell
- 1982–83 record: 30–35–15
- Home record: 20–12–8
- Road record: 10–23–7
- Goals for: 303
- Goals against: 309

Team information
- General manager: Harry Neale
- Coach: Roger Neilson
- Captain: Stan Smyl
- Alternate captains: Doug Halward; Rick Lanz
- Arena: Pacific Coliseum
- Average attendance: 14,206

Team leaders
- Goals: Stan Smyl (38)
- Assists: Thomas Gradin (54)
- Points: Stan Smyl (88)
- Penalty minutes: Tiger Williams (265)
- Wins: Richard Brodeur (21)
- Goals against average: John Garrett (3.08)

The 1982–83 Vancouver Canucks season was the team's 13th in the National Hockey League (NHL).

== Offseason ==
Harry Neale was named general manager on June 1. Previous general manager Jake Milford moved into an advisory role and signed a two-year contract as Senior Vice-President and alternate governor.

== Regular season ==
=== Final standings ===
Smythe Division
	GP	W	L	T	GF	GA	Pts
**Edmonton Oilers**	80	47	21	12	424	315	106
**Calgary Flames**	80	32	34	14	321	316	78
**Vancouver Canucks**	80	30	35	15	303	309	75
**Winnipeg Jets**	80	33	39	8	311	333	74
Los Angeles Kings	80	27	41	12	308	365	66

Note: GP = Games played, W = Wins, L = Losses, T = Ties, Pts = Points, GF = Goals for, GA = Goals against
Note: Teams that qualified for the playoffs are highlighted in bold.

=== Record vs. opponents ===
Smythe Division record vs. opponents

==== Vs. Campbell Conference ====
**Vs. Smythe Division**

1982–83 NHL records
Team	**CGY**	**EDM**	**LAK**	**VAN**	**WIN**	**Total**
Calgary	—	2−4−2	3−3−2	5−2−1	5−2−1	**15−11−6**
Edmonton	4−2−2	—	5−1−2	5−2−1	6−2	**20−7−5**
Los Angeles	3−3−2	1−5−2	—	3−3−2	2−6	**9−17−6**
Vancouver	2−5−1	2−5−1	3−3−2	—	4−3−1	**11−16−5**
Winnipeg	2−5−1	2−6	6−2	3−4−1	—	**13−17−2**

**Vs. Norris Division**

1982–83 NHL records
Team	**CHI**	**DET**	**MIN**	**STL**	**TOR**	**Total**
Calgary	2−1	2−1	1−1−1	2−1	1−1−1	**8−5−2**
Edmonton	1−1−1	2−1	2−1	2−0−1	2−0−1	**9−3−3**
Los Angeles	0−2−1	1−0−2	1−2	1−2	2−1	**5−7−3**
Vancouver	1−0−2	1−1−1	0−2−1	3−0	1−2	**6−5−4**
Winnipeg	1−2	3−0	0−3	2−1	3−0	**9−6−0**

**Vs. Wales Conference**

**Vs. Adams Division**

1982–83 NHL records
Team	**BOS**	**BUF**	**HFD**	**MTL**	**QUE**	**Total**
Calgary	0−2−1	1−2	1−0−2	1−2	0−2−1	**3−8−4**
Edmonton	0−2−1	2−1	2−0−1	2−1	1−1−1	**7−5−3**
Los Angeles	2−1	1−2	2−1	1−2	1−1−1	**7−7−1**
Vancouver	1−2	1−1−1	2−1	0−3	3−0	**7−7−1**
Winnipeg	2−0−1	1−2	1−1−1	0−3	1−2	**5−8−2**

**Vs. Patrick Division**

1982–83 NHL records
Team	**NJD**	**NYI**	**NYR**	**PHI**	**PIT**	**WSH**	**Total**
Calgary	2−1	0−2−1	0−2−1	0−3	3−0	1−2	**6−10−2**
Edmonton	3−0	0−3	3−0	1−2	2−1	2−0−1	**11−6−1**
Los Angeles	2−1	0−3	1−1−1	1−2	1−2	1−1−1	**6−10−2**
Vancouver	0−1−2	1−2	1−1–1	1−1−1	2−1	1−1−1	**6−7−5**
Winnipeg	2−1	1−1−1	1−1−1	0−3	2−1	0−1−2	**6−8−4**

== Schedule and results ==
1982–83 regular season
October

Game	Result	Date	Score	Opponent	Record	Recap
1	W	October 5, 1982	2–1	New York Islanders (1982–83) |	1–0–0	Recap
2	T	October 6, 1982	3–3	@ Los Angeles Kings (1982–83) |	1–0–1	Recap
3	L	October 9, 1982	3–6	Edmonton Oilers (1982–83) |	1–1–1	Recap
4	L	October 12, 1982	4–5	@ Pittsburgh Penguins (1982–83) |	1–2–1	Recap
5	L	October 14, 1982	1–2	@ Boston Bruins (1982–83) |	1–3–1	Recap
6	L	October 16, 1982	5–6	@ Hartford Whalers (1982–83) |	1–4–1	Recap
7	L	October 19, 1982	4–5	@ New York Islanders (1982–83) |	1–5–1	Recap
8	L	October 20, 1982	5–6	@ New York Rangers (1982–83) |	1–6–1	Recap
9	W	October 23, 1982	3–2	Boston Bruins (1982–83) |	2–6–1	Recap
10	W	October 26, 1982	8–1	Hartford Whalers (1982–83) |	3–6–1	Recap
11	T	October 29, 1982	2–2	Chicago Black Hawks (1982–83) |	3–6–2	Recap
12	W	October 31, 1982	3–2	@ Edmonton Oilers (1982–83) |	4–6–2	Recap

November

Game	Result	Date	Score	Opponent	Record	Recap
13	W	November 2, 1982	5–2	@ Quebec Nordiques (1982–83) |	5–6–2	Recap
14	W	November 4, 1982	4–3	@ Philadelphia Flyers (1982–83) |	6–6–2	Recap
15	L	November 6, 1982	2–4	@ Montreal Canadiens (1982–83) |	6–7–2	Recap
16	L	November 7, 1982	1–3	@ Buffalo Sabres (1982–83) |	6–8–2	Recap
17	W	November 10, 1982	4–2	Los Angeles Kings (1982–83) |	7–8–2	Recap
18	L	November 13, 1982	2–3	@ Winnipeg Jets (1982–83) |	7–9–2	Recap
19	L	November 14, 1982	5–6	@ Winnipeg Jets (1982–83) |	7–10–2	Recap
20	T	November 16, 1982	4–4	Detroit Red Wings (1982–83) |	7–10–3	Recap
21	T	November 20, 1982	3–3	@ Edmonton Oilers (1982–83) |	7–10–4	Recap
22	W	November 21, 1982	5–3	Washington Capitals (1982–83) |	8–10–4	Recap
23	W	November 23, 1982	5–2	Quebec Nordiques (1982–83) |	9–10–4	Recap
24	T	November 26, 1982	4–4	New Jersey Devils (1982–83) |	9–10–5	Recap
25	T	November 28, 1982	5–5	Philadelphia Flyers (1982–83) |	9–10–6	Recap
26	L	November 30, 1982	2–5	Los Angeles Kings (1982–83) |	9–11–6	Recap

December

Game	Result	Date	Score	Opponent	Record	Recap
27	L	December 3, 1982	4–5	Calgary Flames (1982–83) |	9–12–6	Recap
28	W	December 5, 1982	6–3	St. Louis Blues (1982–83) |	10–12–6	Recap
29	W	December 8, 1982	7–3	@ Toronto Maple Leafs (1982–83) |	11–12–6	Recap
30	L	December 9, 1982	6–9	@ Minnesota North Stars (1982–83) |	11–13–6	Recap
31	W	December 11, 1982	3–1	@ St. Louis Blues (1982–83) |	12–13–6	Recap
32	L	December 15, 1982	2–3	Montreal Canadiens (1982–83) |	12–14–6	Recap
33	W	December 16, 1982	3–2	@ Calgary Flames (1982–83) |	13–14–6	Recap
34	T	December 18, 1982	3–3	Minnesota North Stars (1982–83) |	13–14–7	Recap
35	L	December 23, 1982	3–6	Calgary Flames (1982–83) |	13–15–7	Recap
36	L	December 26, 1982	2–4	@ Los Angeles Kings (1982–83) |	13–16–7	Recap
37	T	December 28, 1982	4–4	Winnipeg Jets (1982–83) |	13–16–8	Recap
38	L	December 31, 1982	1–8	Edmonton Oilers (1982–83) |	13–17–8	Recap

January

Game	Result	Date	Score	Opponent	Record	Recap
39	L	January 2, 1983	1–3	@ New Jersey Devils (1982–83) |	13–18–8	Recap
40	L	January 4, 1983	1–4	@ Philadelphia Flyers (1982–83) |	13–19–8	Recap
41	W	January 6, 1983	6–4	@ Hartford Whalers (1982–83) |	14–19–8	Recap
42	T	January 7, 1983	5–5	@ Buffalo Sabres (1982–83) |	14–19–9	Recap
43	L	January 12, 1983	4–6	Calgary Flames (1982–83) |	14–20–9	Recap
44	L	January 13, 1983	2–5	@ Calgary Flames (1982–83) |	14–21–9	Recap
45	W	January 16, 1983	6–4	Winnipeg Jets (1982–83) |	15–21–9	Recap
46	T	January 18, 1983	3–3	New York Rangers (1982–83) |	15–21–10	Recap
47	L	January 19, 1983	4–9	@ Edmonton Oilers (1982–83) |	15–22–10	Recap
48	W	January 22, 1983	4–3	Edmonton Oilers (1982–83) |	16–22–10	Recap
49	L	January 25, 1983	2–6	@ Detroit Red Wings (1982–83) |	16–23–10	Recap
50	W	January 26, 1983	5–1	@ Chicago Black Hawks (1982–83) |	17–23–10	Recap
51	L	January 29, 1983	3–5	New York Islanders (1982–83) |	17–24–10	Recap

February

Game	Result	Date	Score	Opponent	Record	Recap
52	L	February 1, 1983	3–7	Montreal Canadiens (1982–83) |	17–25–10	Recap
53	L	February 5, 1983	4–6	@ Toronto Maple Leafs (1982–83) |	17–26–10	Recap
54	T	February 6, 1983	4–4	@ New Jersey Devils (1982–83) |	17–26–11	Recap
55	W	February 9, 1983	6–2	@ Pittsburgh Penguins (1982–83) |	18–26–11	Recap
56	L	February 13, 1983	1–3	@ Boston Bruins (1982–83) |	18–27–11	Recap
57	L	February 15, 1983	4–7	@ Winnipeg Jets (1982–83) |	18–28–11	Recap
58	L	February 18, 1983	1–2	Washington Capitals (1982–83) |	18–29–11	Recap
59	W	February 20, 1983	5–2	Los Angeles Kings (1982–83) |	19–29–11	Recap
60	W	February 22, 1983	6–3	St. Louis Blues (1982–83) |	20–29–11	Recap
61	L	February 24, 1983	0–8	@ Los Angeles Kings (1982–83) |	20–30–11	Recap
62	L	February 25, 1983	1–4	Toronto Maple Leafs (1982–83) |	20–31–11	Recap
63	W	February 27, 1983	6–2	Calgary Flames (1982–83) |	21–31–11	Recap

March

Game	Result	Date	Score	Opponent	Record	Recap
64	L	March 1, 1983	1–8	@ Calgary Flames (1982–83) |	21–32–11	Recap
65	W	March 2, 1983	3–0	@ Winnipeg Jets (1982–83) |	22–32–11	Recap
66	W	March 5, 1983	5–4	Winnipeg Jets (1982–83) |	23–32–11	Recap
67	W	March 6, 1983	6–2	Winnipeg Jets (1982–83) |	24–32–11	Recap
68	W	March 8, 1983	7–3	New York Rangers (1982–83) |	25–32–11	Recap
69	W	March 12, 1983	8–3	Buffalo Sabres (1982–83) |	26–32–11	Recap
70	L	March 14, 1983	3–6	@ Minnesota North Stars (1982–83) |	26–33–11	Recap
71	L	March 16, 1983	3–4	@ Edmonton Oilers (1982–83) |	26–34–11	Recap
72	W	March 18, 1983	7–3	Quebec Nordiques (1982–83) |	27–34–11	Recap
73	W	March 20, 1983	6–3	Detroit Red Wings (1982–83) |	28–34–11	Recap
74	W	March 21, 1983	7–3	Pittsburgh Penguins (1982–83) |	29–34–11	Recap
75	T	March 23, 1983	1–1	@ Washington Capitals (1982–83) |	29–34–12	Recap
76	T	March 25, 1983	3–3	Chicago Black Hawks (1982–83) |	29–34–13	Recap
77	W	March 27, 1983	8–4	Los Angeles Kings (1982–83) |	30–34–13	Recap
78	L	March 29, 1983	4–7	Edmonton Oilers (1982–83) |	30–35–13	Recap
79	T	March 31, 1983	4–4	@ Calgary Flames (1982–83) |	30–35–14	Recap

April

Game	Result	Date	Score	Opponent	Record	Recap
80	T	April 3, 1983	2–2	@ Los Angeles Kings (1982–83) |	30–35–15	Recap

Legend: Win (2 points) Loss (0 points) Tie (1 point)

=== Playoffs ===
1983 Stanley Cup playoffs
Smythe Division Semifinals vs. (S2) Calgary Flames – Flames win 3–1

Game	Date	Visitor	Score	Home	OT	Decision	Attendance	Series	Recap
1	April 6	Vancouver	3–4	Calgary	OT	Brodeur	7,242	0–1	Boxscore
2	April 7	Vancouver	3–5	Calgary		Brodeur	7,292	0–2	Boxscore
3	April 9	Calgary	4–5	Vancouver		Garrett	16,413	1–2	Boxscore
4	April 10	Calgary	4–3	Vancouver	OT	Brodeur	16,413	1–3	Boxscore

Legend: Win Loss

== Draft picks ==
Vancouver's draft picks at the 1982 NHL entry draft held at the Montreal Forum in Montreal.

Round	#	Player	Nationality	College/Junior/Club team (League)
1	11	Michel Petit	Canada	Sherbrooke Castors (QMJHL)
3	53	Yves Lapointe	Canada	Shawinigan Cataractes (QMJHL)
4	71	Shawn Kilroy	Canada	Peterborough Petes (OHL)
6	116	Taylor Hall	Canada	Regina Pats (WHL)
7	137	Parie Proft	Canada	Calgary Wranglers (WHL)
8	158	Newell Brown	Canada	Michigan State University (CCHA)
9	179	Don McLaren	Canada	Ottawa 67's (OHL)
10	200	Al Raymond	Canada	Niagara Falls Flyers (OHL)
11	221	Steve Driscoll	Canada	Cornwall Royals (OHL)
12	242	Shawn Green	Canada	Victoria Cougars (WHL)

== See also ==
- 1982–83 NHL season
