= 1982–83 Winnipeg Jets season =

NHL hockey team season

1982–83 Winnipeg Jets
- Division: 4th Smythe
- Conference: 6th Campbell
- 1982–83 record: 33–39–8
- Home record: 22–16–2
- Road record: 11–23–6
- Goals for: 311
- Goals against: 333

Team information
- General manager: John Ferguson
- Coach: Tom Watt
- Captain: Dave Christian; Lucien DeBlois
- Alternate captains: None
- Arena: Winnipeg Arena

Team leaders
- Goals: Dale Hawerchuk (40)
- Assists: Dave Babych (61)
- Points: Dale Hawerchuk (91)
- Penalty minutes: Bryan Maxwell (131)
- Wins: Doug Soetaert (19)
- Goals against average: Brian Hayward (3.73)

The 1982–83 Winnipeg Jets season was the 11th season of the Winnipeg Jets, their fourth season in the National Hockey League (NHL).

== Offseason ==
After a very successful 1981–82 season, in which the club made the playoffs for the first time since joining the NHL in 1979, the Jets had a quiet off-season. With the Colorado Rockies moving to East Rutherford, New Jersey and becoming the New Jersey Devils, the NHL underwent realignment, and the Jets were shifted from the Norris Division back to the Smythe Division, where the team spent their first two seasons from 1979 to 1981. Winnipeg joined the Calgary Flames, Edmonton Oilers, Los Angeles Kings and Vancouver Canucks to form the five team division.

On May 9, 1982, the team signed undrafted free agent goaltender Brian Hayward, who had spent the past four seasons with the Cornell Big Red, going 42-27-2 with a 3.88 GAA in his time with the team. On June 9, 1982, the Jets participated in the 1982 NHL entry draft, and with the 12th overall pick in the draft, the team picked defenseman Jim Kyte from the Cornwall Royals of the OHL. Kyte, a big, stay-at-home defenseman, had four goals and 17 points in 52 games in his rookie season with Cornwall in 1981–82.

== Regular season ==
=== Final standings ===
Smythe Division
	GP	W	L	T	GF	GA	Pts
**Edmonton Oilers**	80	47	21	12	424	315	106
**Calgary Flames**	80	32	34	14	321	316	78
**Vancouver Canucks**	80	30	35	15	303	309	75
**Winnipeg Jets**	80	33	39	8	311	333	74
Los Angeles Kings	80	27	41	12	308	365	66

Note: GP = Games played, W = Wins, L = Losses, T = Ties, Pts = Points, GF = Goals for, GA = Goals against
Note: Teams that qualified for the playoffs are highlighted in bold.

=== Record vs. opponents ===
Smythe Division record vs. opponents

==== Vs. Campbell Conference ====
**Vs. Smythe Division**

1982–83 NHL records
Team	**CGY**	**EDM**	**LAK**	**VAN**	**WIN**	**Total**
Calgary	—	2−4−2	3−3−2	5−2−1	5−2−1	**15−11−6**
Edmonton	4−2−2	—	5−1−2	5−2−1	6−2	**20−7−5**
Los Angeles	3−3−2	1−5−2	—	3−3−2	2−6	**9−17−6**
Vancouver	2−5−1	2−5−1	3−3−2	—	4−3−1	**11−16−5**
Winnipeg	2−5−1	2−6	6−2	3−4−1	—	**13−17−2**

**Vs. Norris Division**

1982–83 NHL records
Team	**CHI**	**DET**	**MIN**	**STL**	**TOR**	**Total**
Calgary	2−1	2−1	1−1−1	2−1	1−1−1	**8−5−2**
Edmonton	1−1−1	2−1	2−1	2−0−1	2−0−1	**9−3−3**
Los Angeles	0−2−1	1−0−2	1−2	1−2	2−1	**5−7−3**
Vancouver	1−0−2	1−1−1	0−2−1	3−0	1−2	**6−5−4**
Winnipeg	1−2	3−0	0−3	2−1	3−0	**9−6−0**

**Vs. Wales Conference**

**Vs. Adams Division**

1982–83 NHL records
Team	**BOS**	**BUF**	**HFD**	**MTL**	**QUE**	**Total**
Calgary	0−2−1	1−2	1−0−2	1−2	0−2−1	**3−8−4**
Edmonton	0−2−1	2−1	2−0−1	2−1	1−1−1	**7−5−3**
Los Angeles	2−1	1−2	2−1	1−2	1−1−1	**7−7−1**
Vancouver	1−2	1−1−1	2−1	0−3	3−0	**7−7−1**
Winnipeg	2−0−1	1−2	1−1−1	0−3	1−2	**5−8−2**

**Vs. Patrick Division**

1982–83 NHL records
Team	**NJD**	**NYI**	**NYR**	**PHI**	**PIT**	**WSH**	**Total**
Calgary	2−1	0−2−1	0−2−1	0−3	3−0	1−2	**6−10−2**
Edmonton	3−0	0−3	3−0	1−2	2−1	2−0−1	**11−6−1**
Los Angeles	2−1	0−3	1−1−1	1−2	1−2	1−1−1	**6−10−2**
Vancouver	0−1−2	1−2	1−1–1	1−1−1	2−1	1−1−1	**6−7−5**
Winnipeg	2−1	1−1−1	1−1−1	0−3	2−1	0−1−2	**6−8−4**

== Schedule and results ==
1982–83 regular season
October

Game	Result	Date	Score	Opponent	Record	Attendance
1	L	October 6, 1982	4–5	Minnesota North Stars (1982–83)	0–1–0	14,347
2	W	October 9, 1982	8–0	@ Detroit Red Wings (1982–83)	1–1–0	10,509
3	W	October 10, 1982	5–3	@ Chicago Black Hawks (1982–83)	2–1–0	14,564
4	L	October 12, 1982	3–5	Los Angeles Kings (1982–83)	2–2–0	10,491
5	W	October 14, 1982	5–2	@ St. Louis Blues (1982–83)	3–2–0	10,153
6	T	October 17, 1982	5–5	Calgary Flames (1982–83)	3–2–1	11,526
7	W	October 22, 1982	3–1	New Jersey Devils (1982–83)	4–2–1	12,534
8	W	October 24, 1982	9–5	Edmonton Oilers (1982–83)	5–2–1	13,965
9	W	October 27, 1982	7–3	Los Angeles Kings (1982–83)	6–2–1	12,325
10	L	October 31, 1982	2–3	Philadelphia Flyers (1982–83)	6–3–1	10,986

November

Game	Result	Date	Score	Opponent	Record	Attendance
11	L	November 3, 1982	2–7	@ Edmonton Oilers (1982–83)	6–4–1	17,498
12	L	November 4, 1982	5–7	@ Calgary Flames (1982–83)	6–5–1	7,242
13	W	November 7, 1982	5–2	Calgary Flames (1982–83)	7–5–1	11,226
14	W	November 13, 1982	3–2	Vancouver Canucks (1982–83)	8–5–1	12,441
15	W	November 14, 1982	6–5	Vancouver Canucks (1982–83)	9–5–1	12,838
16	L	November 17, 1982	2–7	Buffalo Sabres (1982–83)	9–6–1	10,651
17	T	November 19, 1982	3–3	Washington Capitals (1982–83)	9–6–2	11,555
18	L	November 24, 1982	5–7	Chicago Black Hawks (1982–83)	9–7–2	12,450
19	L	November 26, 1982	5–6	Edmonton Oilers (1982–83)	9–8–2	15,639
20	W	November 27, 1982	6–3	@ Toronto Maple Leafs (1982–83)	10–8–2	16,382
21	L	November 29, 1982	4–9	@ Montreal Canadiens (1982–83)	10–9–2	15,992
22	L	November 30, 1982	6–8	@ Quebec Nordiques (1982–83)	10–10–2	14,828

December

Game	Result	Date	Score	Opponent	Record	Attendance
23	W	December 3, 1982	4–2	New York Islanders (1982–83)	11–10–2	14,853
24	L	December 4, 1982	1–4	@ Minnesota North Stars (1982–83)	11–11–2	15,351
25	W	December 6, 1982	5–3	@ New Jersey Devils (1982–83)	12–11–2	8,862
26	T	December 7, 1982	3–3	@ Washington Capitals (1982–83)	12–11–3	8,612
27	L	December 10, 1982	4–6	Calgary Flames (1982–83)	12–12–3	12,550
28	W	December 11, 1982	4–3	Los Angeles Kings (1982–83)	13–12–3	11,526
29	W	December 14, 1982	4–3	@ St. Louis Blues (1982–83)	14–12–3	10,015
30	L	December 15, 1982	3–10	@ Chicago Black Hawks (1982–83)	14–13–3	16,436
31	L	December 17, 1982	0–2	Hartford Whalers (1982–83)	14–14–3	10,561
32	L	December 19, 1982	2–3	New Jersey Devils (1982–83)	14–15–3	10,815
33	W	December 21, 1982	4–2	@ Los Angeles Kings (1982–83)	15–15–3	10,164
34	L	December 26, 1982	2–3	Minnesota North Stars (1982–83)	15–16–3	15,752
35	T	December 28, 1982	4–4	@ Vancouver Canucks (1982–83)	15–16–4	14,980
36	W	December 29, 1982	4–3	@ Los Angeles Kings (1982–83)	16–16–4	11,700

January

Game	Result	Date	Score	Opponent	Record	Attendance
37	L	January 1, 1983	3–5	@ Edmonton Oilers (1982–83)	16–17–4	17,498
38	W	January 2, 1983	6–4	Boston Bruins (1982–83)	17–17–4	N/A
39	L	January 5, 1983	3–8	Edmonton Oilers (1982–83)	17–18–4	14,825
40	L	January 6, 1983	1–5	@ Calgary Flames (1982–83)	17–19–4	7,242
41	W	January 9, 1983	4–3	Pittsburgh Penguins (1982–83)	18–19–4	12,001
42	L	January 11, 1983	1–4	@ New York Islanders (1982–83)	18–20–4	15,230
43	T	January 12, 1983	5–5	@ New York Rangers (1982–83)	18–20–5	17,431
44	L	January 14, 1983	2–4	St. Louis Blues (1982–83)	18–21–5	13,650
45	L	January 16, 1983	4–6	@ Vancouver Canucks (1982–83)	18–22–5	12,501
46	W	January 19, 1983	6–3	Toronto Maple Leafs (1982–83)	19–22–5	11,941
47	W	January 21, 1983	4–1	New York Rangers (1982–83)	20–22–5	14,301
48	L	January 23, 1983	2–5	@ Buffalo Sabres (1982–83)	20–23–5	10,613
49	L	January 25, 1983	3–6	@ Quebec Nordiques (1982–83)	20–24–5	15,193
50	L	January 27, 1983	2–5	@ Philadelphia Flyers (1982–83)	20–25–5	16,702
51	T	January 29, 1983	2–2	@ Hartford Whalers (1982–83)	20–25–6	10,416
52	T	January 31, 1983	2–2	@ Boston Bruins (1982–83)	20–25–7	11,432

February

Game	Result	Date	Score	Opponent	Record	Attendance
53	L	February 2, 1983	3–6	Philadelphia Flyers (1982–83)	20–26–7	13,027
54	W	February 4, 1983	6–4	Pittsburgh Penguins (1982–83)	21–26–7	11,068
55	L	February 6, 1983	0–2	Montreal Canadiens (1982–83)	21–27–7	15,372
56	L	February 10, 1983	3–5	@ Montreal Canadiens (1982–83)	21–28–7	15,834
57	W	February 12, 1983	4–2	@ Detroit Red Wings (1982–83)	22–28–7	13,828
58	L	February 13, 1983	1–6	@ Washington Capitals (1982–83)	22–29–7	9,582
59	W	February 15, 1983	7–4	Vancouver Canucks (1982–83)	23–29–7	11,009
60	W	February 18, 1983	6–5	Boston Bruins (1982–83)	24–29–7	14,399
61	L	February 20, 1983	4–9	@ New York Rangers (1982–83)	24–30–7	17,423
62	T	February 22, 1983	2–2	@ New York Islanders (1982–83)	24–30–8	15,090
63	L	February 23, 1983	4–6	@ Pittsburgh Penguins (1982–83)	24–31–8	4,965
64	W	February 25, 1983	5–3	Hartford Whalers (1982–83)	25–31–8	11,828
65	L	February 27, 1983	0–3	@ Edmonton Oilers (1982–83)	25–32–8	17,498

March

Game	Result	Date	Score	Opponent	Record	Attendance
66	L	March 2, 1983	0–3	Vancouver Canucks (1982–83)	25–33–8	11,776
67	L	March 5, 1983	4–5	@ Vancouver Canucks (1982–83)	25–34–8	14,728
68	L	March 6, 1983	2–6	@ Vancouver Canucks (1982–83)	25–35–8	16,053
69	W	March 9, 1983	6–0	Buffalo Sabres (1982–83)	26–35–8	12,528
70	L	March 10, 1983	3–6	@ Calgary Flames (1982–83)	26–36–8	7,242
71	W	March 13, 1983	6–5	@ Los Angeles Kings (1982–83)	27–36–8	12,502
72	L	March 15, 1983	3–4	@ Los Angeles Kings (1982–83)	27–37–8	10,271
73	W	March 18, 1983	7–3	Toronto Maple Leafs (1982–83)	28–37–8	14,762
74	W	March 20, 1983	3–2	Quebec Nordiques (1982–83)	29–37–8	15,075
75	W	March 23, 1983	7–4	Edmonton Oilers (1982–83)	30–37–8	15,807
76	W	March 26, 1983	5–2	@ Calgary Flames (1982–83)	31–37–8	7,242
77	L	March 27, 1983	3–4	Calgary Flames (1982–83)	31–38–8	15,120
78	W	March 30, 1983	10–5	Los Angeles Kings (1982–83)	32–38–8	13,039

April

Game	Result	Date	Score	Opponent	Record	Attendance
79	L	April 1, 1983	2–7	@ Edmonton Oilers (1982–83)	32–39–8	17,498
80	W	April 3, 1983	8–3	Detroit Red Wings (1982–83)	33–39–8	12,293

Legend: Win (2 points) Loss (0 points) Tie (1 point)

== Playoffs ==
The Jets faced the Smythe Division champion Edmonton Oilers in the Division semi-finals. The Oilers swept the Jets in three games.

== Player statistics ==
Regular Season
Player name	Age	Pos.	GP	G	A	Pts	PIM
Dale Hawerchuk	19	C	79	40	51	91	31
Paul MacLean	24	F	80	32	44	76	121
Dave Babych	21	D	79	13	61	74	56
Thomas Steen	22	F	75	26	33	59	60
Lucien DeBlois	25	F	79	27	27	54	69
Brian Mullen	20	F	80	24	26	50	14
Dave Christian	23	R	55	18	26	44	23
Doug Smail		F	80	15	29	44	32
Morris Lukowich	26	L	69	22	21	43	67
Bengt Lundholm	27	F	58	14	28	42	16
Norm Dupont	25	L	39	7	16	23	6
Tim Watters	23	D	77	5	18	23	98
Bryan Maxwell	26	D	54	7	13	20	131
Serge Savard	36	D	76	4	16	20	29
Scott Arniel	19	L	75	13	5	18	46
Don Spring	23	D	80	0	16	16	37
Ron Wilson	26	C	12	6	3	9	4
Craig Levie	23	D	22	4	5	9	31
Jerry Butler	31	F	43	3	6	9	14
Moe Mantha	21	D	21	2	7	9	6
Murray Eaves	22	F	26	2	7	9	2
Larry Hopkins	28	L	12	3	1	4	4
Wade Campbell	21	D	42	1	2	3	50
Ed Staniowski	27	G	17	0	1	1	0
Brian Hayward	22	G	24	0	1	1	0
Jimmy Mann	23	R	40	0	1	1	73
Doug Soetaert	26	G	44	0	1	1	10
Jim Kyte	18	D	2	0	0	0	0
Tim Trimper	23	F	5	0	0	0	0

== Transactions ==
=== Trades ===
March 7, 1983	To Edmonton Oilers Willy Lindstrom	To Winnipeg Jets Laurie Boschman
June 8, 1983	To Washington Capitals Dave Christian	To Winnipeg Jets 1st round pick in 1983 – Bobby Dollas
June 24, 1983	To Hartford Whalers Norm Dupont	To Winnipeg Jets 4th round pick in 1984 – Chris Mills

=== Waivers ===
October 4, 1982	To Pittsburgh Penguins Doug Lecuyer

=== Free agents ===
Player	Former team
Brian Hayward	Undrafted Free Agent
Wade Campbell	Undrafted Free Agent
Jerry Butler	Vancouver Canucks

== Draft picks ==
Winnipeg selected the following players at the 1982 NHL entry draft, which was held at the Montreal Forum in Montreal on June 9, 1982.

=== NHL amateur draft ===
Round	Pick	Player	Nationality	College/Junior/Club team
1	12	Jim Kyte (D)	Canada	Cornwall Royals (OHL)
4	74	Tom Martin (LW)	Canada	Kelowna Buckaroos (BCJHL)
4	75	Dave Ellett (D)	Canada	Ottawa Tier II (COJHL)
5	96	Tim Mishler (C)	United States	East Grand Forks (ND) High School
7	138	Derek Ray (RW)	United States	Seattle Jr. B (NAJHL)
8	159	Guy Gosselin (D)	United States	Rochester (MN) John Marshall High School
9	180	Tom Ward (D)	United States	Richfield (MN) High School
10	201	Mike Savage (LW)	Canada	Sudbury Wolves (OHL)
11	222	Bob Shaw (RW)	Canada	Penticton Knights (BCJHL)
12	243	Jan Ericson (LW)	Sweden	AIK (SEL)

== Farm teams ==
Sherbrooke Jets

== See also ==
- 1982–83 NHL season
