= 1982–83 Boston Bruins season =

NHL team season

1982–83 Boston Bruins
- Adams Division champions
- Division: 1st Adams
- Conference: 1st Wales
- 1982–83 record: 50–20–10
- Home record: 28–6–6
- Road record: 22–14–4
- Goals for: 327
- Goals against: 228

Team information
- General manager: Harry Sinden
- Coach: Gerry Cheevers
- Captain: Wayne Cashman
- Alternate captains: None
- Arena: Boston Garden
- Average attendance: 13,271

Team leaders
- Goals: Rick Middleton (49)
- Assists: Barry Pederson (61)
- Points: Barry Pederson (107)
- Penalty minutes: Mike Milbury (216)
- Plus/minus: Ray Bourque (49)
- Wins: Pete Peeters (40)
- Goals against average: Pete Peeters (2.37)

The 1982–83 Boston Bruins season was the Bruins' 59th season.

== Regular season ==
=== Final standings ===
Adams Division
	GP	W	L	T	GF	GA	Pts
**Boston Bruins**	80	50	20	10	327	228	110
**Montreal Canadiens**	80	42	24	14	350	286	98
**Buffalo Sabres**	80	38	29	13	318	285	89
**Quebec Nordiques**	80	34	34	12	343	336	80
Hartford Whalers	80	19	54	7	261	403	45

Note: GP = Games played, W = Wins, L = Losses, T = Ties, Pts = Points, GF = Goals for, GA = Goals against
Note: Teams that qualified for the playoffs are highlighted in bold.

=== Record vs. opponents ===
Adams Division record vs. opponents

==== Vs. Wales Conference ====
**Vs. Adams Division**

1982–83 NHL records
Team	**BOS**	**BUF**	**HFD**	**MTL**	**QUE**	**Total**
Boston	—	5–3	6–2	3–3–2	5–2–1	**19–10–3**
Buffalo	3–5	—	5–2–1	3–3–2	3–3–2	**14–13–5**
Hartford	2–6	2–5–1	—	3–5	2–6	**9–22–1**
Montreal	3–3–2	3–3–2	5–3	—	5–2–1	**16–11–5**
Quebec	2–5–1	3–3–2	6–2	2–5–1	—	**13–15–4**

**Vs. Patrick Division**

1982–83 NHL records
Team	**NJD**	**NYI**	**NYR**	**PHI**	**PIT**	**WSH**	**Total**
Boston	1−0−2	2−0−1	3−0	2−0−1	2−1	0−3	**10−4−4**
Buffalo	2−0−1	2−1	2−0−1	2−1	1−1−1	3−0	**12−3−3**
Hartford	2–1	1–2	1–2	1–2	0–3	0−2−1	**5−12−1**
Montreal	2−1	0−1−2	2–1	2−1	2−1	1−0−2	**9−5−4**
Quebec	2−1	1−1–1	2–1	0−3	3−0	1−1−1	**9−7−2**

==== Vs. Campbell Conference ====
**Vs. Norris Division**

1982–83 NHL records
Team	**CHI**	**DET**	**MIN**	**STL**	**TOR**	**Total**
Boston	3–0	3–0	3–0	3–0	2–1	**14–1–0**
Buffalo	1−1−1	1−1−1	0−2−1	2−1	0−2−1	**4−7−4**
Hartford	0–3	0–3	0−2−1	1–2	1–2	**2–12–1**
Montreal	0–3	1−0–2	3–0	2–0–1	0−1–2	**6–4–5**
Quebec	1–2	1–1–1	2–1	1–1–1	1–1–1	**6–6–3**

**Vs. Smythe Division**

1982–83 NHL records
Team	**CGY**	**EDM**	**LAK**	**VAN**	**WIN**	**Total**
Boston	2−0−1	2−0−1	1−2	2−1	0−2−1	**7−5−3**
Buffalo	2−1	1–2	2−1	1−1−1	2−1	**8−6−1**
Hartford	0−1–2	0–2–1	1–2	1–2	1–1–1	**3–8–4**
Montreal	2−1	1−2	2−1	3–0	3−0	**11−4−0**
Quebec	2−0−1	1−1−1	1−1−1	0−3	2−1	**6−6−3**

== Schedule and results ==
1982–83 regular season
October

Game	Result	Date	Score	Opponent	Record
1	L	October 7, 1982	1–5	Montreal Canadiens (1982–83)	0–1–0
2	W	October 9, 1982	5–4	@ Hartford Whalers (1982–83)	1–1–0
3	W	October 10, 1982	4–3	Pittsburgh Penguins (1982–83)	2–1–0
4	T	October 12, 1982	2–2	@ New Jersey Devils (1982–83)	2–1–1
5	W	October 14, 1982	2–1	Vancouver Canucks (1982–83)	3–1–1
6	T	October 16, 1982	6–6	Edmonton Oilers (1982–83)	3–1–2
7	W	October 19, 1982	3–1	@ Calgary Flames (1982–83)	4–1–2
8	W	October 21, 1982	5–3	@ Edmonton Oilers (1982–83)	5–1–2
9	L	October 23, 1982	2–3	@ Vancouver Canucks (1982–83)	5–2–2
10	L	October 24, 1982	4–5	@ Los Angeles Kings (1982–83)	5–3–2
11	L	October 27, 1982	1–4	@ Toronto Maple Leafs (1982–83)	5–4–2
12	T	October 30, 1982	4–4	@ Montreal Canadiens (1982–83)	5–4–3

November

Game	Result	Date	Score	Opponent	Record
13	W	November 3, 1982	3–2	@ Buffalo Sabres (1982–83)	6–4–3
14	L	November 4, 1982	2–5	Hartford Whalers (1982–83)	6–5–3
15	W	November 7, 1982	7–0	Detroit Red Wings (1982–83)	7–5–3
16	L	November 11, 1982	2–3	Quebec Nordiques (1982–83)	7–6–3
17	W	November 13, 1982	3–2	Buffalo Sabres (1982–83)	8–6–3
18	W	November 14, 1982	7–3	St. Louis Blues (1982–83)	9–6–3
19	W	November 16, 1982	7–4	@ Quebec Nordiques (1982–83)	10–6–3
20	W	November 18, 1982	3–1	@ New York Islanders (1982–83)	11–6–3
21	L	November 20, 1982	3–4	@ Pittsburgh Penguins (1982–83)	11–7–3
22	W	November 21, 1982	2–1	Calgary Flames (1982–83)	12–7–3
23	T	November 24, 1982	4–4	@ Philadelphia Flyers (1982–83)	12–7–4
24	T	November 25, 1982	1–1	New York Islanders (1982–83)	12–7–5
25	W	November 27, 1982	8–0	Hartford Whalers (1982–83)	13–7–5

December

Game	Result	Date	Score	Opponent	Record
26	T	December 2, 1982	3–3	Quebec Nordiques (1982–83)	13–7–6
27	W	December 4, 1982	6–4	@ Montreal Canadiens (1982–83)	14–7–6
28	W	December 5, 1982	6–4	Philadelphia Flyers (1982–83)	15–7–6
29	L	December 7, 1982	5–10	@ Quebec Nordiques (1982–83)	15–8–6
30	W	December 9, 1982	8–5	Montreal Canadiens (1982–83)	16–8–6
31	W	December 11, 1982	4–2	Chicago Black Hawks (1982–83)	17–8–6
32	L	December 12, 1982	3–4	@ Washington Capitals (1982–83)	17–9–6
33	W	December 16, 1982	8–1	Buffalo Sabres (1982–83)	18–9–6
34	W	December 18, 1982	4–0	Los Angeles Kings (1982–83)	19–9–6
35	W	December 23, 1982	5–1	@ Hartford Whalers (1982–83)	20–9–6
36	W	December 26, 1982	5–2	New Jersey Devils (1982–83)	21–9–6
37	W	December 28, 1982	3–0	@ St. Louis Blues (1982–83)	22–9–6
38	W	December 31, 1982	5–3	@ Minnesota North Stars (1982–83)	23–9–6

January

Game	Result	Date	Score	Opponent	Record
39	L	January 2, 1983	4–6	@ Winnipeg Jets (1982–83)	23–10–6
40	W	January 5, 1983	4–1	@ Chicago Black Hawks (1982–83)	24–10–6
41	T	January 7, 1983	2–2	@ New Jersey Devils (1982–83)	24–10–7
42	W	January 8, 1983	2–1	@ Montreal Canadiens (1982–83)	25–10–7
43	W	January 12, 1983	6–4	@ Toronto Maple Leafs (1982–83)	26–10–7
44	W	January 13, 1983	2–0	Quebec Nordiques (1982–83)	27–10–7
45	W	January 15, 1983	2–0	New York Rangers (1982–83)	28–10–7
46	W	January 17, 1983	4–3	Minnesota North Stars (1982–83)	29–10–7
47	W	January 20, 1983	4–0	Buffalo Sabres (1982–83)	30–10–7
48	W	January 22, 1983	3–1	@ Detroit Red Wings (1982–83)	31–10–7
49	W	January 24, 1983	3–1	@ New York Rangers (1982–83)	32–10–7
50	W	January 29, 1983	7–3	Detroit Red Wings (1982–83)	33–10–7
51	T	January 31, 1983	2–2	Winnipeg Jets (1982–83)	33–10–8

February

Game	Result	Date	Score	Opponent	Record
52	W	February 3, 1983	5–3	Quebec Nordiques (1982–83)	34–10–8
53	W	February 5, 1983	7–4	Hartford Whalers (1982–83)	35–10–8
54	W	February 6, 1983	5–1	@ Buffalo Sabres (1982–83)	36–10–8
55	W	February 10, 1983	7–3	Pittsburgh Penguins (1982–83)	37–10–8
56	W	February 13, 1983	3–1	Vancouver Canucks (1982–83)	38–10–8
57	L	February 16, 1983	1–3	@ Buffalo Sabres (1982–83)	38–11–8
58	L	February 18, 1983	5–6	@ Winnipeg Jets (1982–83)	38–12–8
59	W	February 19, 1983	6–2	@ Minnesota North Stars (1982–83)	39–12–8
60	L	February 22, 1983	3–5	@ Los Angeles Kings (1982–83)	39–13–8
61	L	February 25, 1983	6–7	@ Buffalo Sabres (1982–83)	39–14–8
62	W	February 27, 1983	4–3	@ Hartford Whalers (1982–83)	40–14–8
63	W	February 28, 1983	6–3	Toronto Maple Leafs (1982–83)	41–14–8

March

Game	Result	Date	Score	Opponent	Record
64	L	March 3, 1983	2–3	Buffalo Sabres (1982–83)	41–15–8
65	W	March 5, 1983	6–3	Chicago Black Hawks (1982–83)	42–15–8
66	W	March 6, 1983	5–2	Edmonton Oilers (1982–83)	43–15–8
67	W	March 8, 1983	11–5	@ Quebec Nordiques (1982–83)	44–15–8
68	L	March 10, 1983	1–3	Montreal Canadiens (1982–83)	44–16–8
69	W	March 12, 1983	5–2	Philadelphia Flyers (1982–83)	45–16–8
70	L	March 13, 1983	4–6	@ Washington Capitals (1982–83)	45–17–8
71	L	March 17, 1983	1–2	Washington Capitals (1982–83)	45–18–8
72	T	March 19, 1983	2–2	Calgary Flames (1982–83)	45–18–9
73	W	March 20, 1983	4–0	@ New York Rangers (1982–83)	46–18–9
74	W	March 22, 1983	3–1	@ New York Islanders (1982–83)	47–18–9
75	W	March 24, 1983	7–6	St. Louis Blues (1982–83)	48–18–9
76	W	March 26, 1983	7–4	Hartford Whalers (1982–83)	49–18–9
77	L	March 27, 1983	1–5	@ Hartford Whalers (1982–83)	49–19–9
78	W	March 29, 1983	4–3	@ Quebec Nordiques (1982–83)	50–19–9

April

Game	Result	Date	Score	Opponent	Record
79	L	April 2, 1983	1–2	@ Montreal Canadiens (1982–83)	50–20–9
80	T	April 3, 1983	4–4	Montreal Canadiens (1982–83)	50–20–10

Legend: Win (2 points) Loss (0 points) Tie (1 point)

== Player statistics ==
=== Regular season ===
Scoring

Player	Pos	GP	G	A	Pts	PIM	+/-	PPG	SHG	GWG
Barry Pederson	C	77	46	61	107	47	38	15	1	10
Rick Middleton	RW	80	49	47	96	8	33	6	3	7
Keith Crowder	RW	74	35	39	74	105	22	10	0	5
Peter McNab	C	74	22	52	74	23	16	5	0	2
Raymond Bourque	D	65	22	51	73	20	49	7	0	5
Mike Krushelnyski	LW/C	79	23	42	65	43	38	4	2	1
Tom Fergus	C	80	28	35	63	39	26	4	0	6
Mike O'Connell	D	80	14	39	53	42	44	7	1	5
Bruce Crowder	RW	80	21	19	40	58	30	1	0	0
Brad Park	D	76	10	26	36	82	20	5	0	0
Craig MacTavish	C	75	10	20	30	18	15	0	0	1
Luc Dufour	LW	73	14	11	25	107	19	0	0	1
Mike Milbury	D	78	9	15	24	216	22	1	0	2
Terry O'Reilly	RW	19	6	14	20	40	16	0	1	1
Brad Palmer	LW	73	6	11	17	18	-7	0	0	0
Wayne Cashman	LW	65	4	11	15	20	2	1	0	1
Marty Howe	D	78	1	11	12	24	21	0	0	0
Randy Hillier	D	70	0	10	10	99	10	0	0	0
Normand Leveille	LW	9	3	6	9	0	1	2	0	2
Steve Kasper	C	24	2	6	8	24	-8	0	0	1
Gord Kluzak	D	70	1	6	7	105	6	0	0	0
Dave Barr	RW	10	1	1	2	7	1	0	0	0
Pete Peeters	G	62	0	2	2	33	0	0	0	0
Mike Gillis	LW	5	0	1	1	0	1	0	0	0
Marco Baron	G	9	0	0	0	4	0	0	0	0
Stan Jonathan	LW	1	0	0	0	0	0	0	0	0
Scott McLellan	RW	2	0	0	0	0	0	0	0	0
Larry Melnyk	D	1	0	0	0	0	-2	0	0	0
Mike Moffat	G	13	0	0	0	2	0	0	0	0

Goaltending

Player	MIN	GP	W	L	T	GA	GAA	SO
Pete Peeters	3611	62	40	11	9	142	2.36	8
Marco Baron	516	9	6	3	0	33	3.84	0
Mike Moffat	673	13	4	6	1	49	4.37	0
Team:	4800	80	50	20	10	224	2.80	8

=== Playoffs ===
Scoring

Player	Pos	GP	G	A	Pts	PIM	PPG	SHG	GWG
Rick Middleton	RW	17	11	22	33	6	4	1	1
Barry Pederson	C	17	14	18	32	21	1	1	2
Raymond Bourque	D	17	8	15	23	10	2	0	1
Mike Krushelnyski	LW/C	17	8	6	14	12	2	0	0
Brad Park	D	16	3	9	12	18	1	0	1
Peter McNab	C	15	3	5	8	4	0	0	0
Mike O'Connell	D	17	3	5	8	12	2	0	1
Keith Crowder	RW	17	1	6	7	54	1	0	0
Gord Kluzak	D	17	1	4	5	54	0	0	0
Bruce Crowder	RW	17	3	1	4	32	0	0	1
Craig MacTavish	C	17	3	1	4	18	0	0	0
Tom Fergus	C	15	2	2	4	15	0	0	0
Mike Gillis	LW	12	1	3	4	2	0	0	0
Steve Kasper	C	12	2	1	3	10	0	1	0
Luc Dufour	LW	17	1	0	1	30	0	0	1
Brad Palmer	LW	7	1	0	1	0	0	1	1
Wayne Cashman	LW	8	0	1	1	0	0	0	0
Marty Howe	D	12	0	1	1	9	0	0	0
Dave Barr	RW	10	0	0	0	2	0	0	0
Randy Hillier	D	3	0	0	0	4	0	0	0
Larry Melnyk	D	11	0	0	0	9	0	0	0
Pete Peeters	G	17	0	0	0	8	0	0	0

Goaltending

Player	MIN	GP	W	L	GA	GAA	SO
Pete Peeters	1024	17	9	8	61	3.57	1
Team:	1024	17	9	8	61	3.57	1

Note:

Pos = Position;GP = Games played; G = Goals; A = Assists; Pts = Points; PIM = Penalty minutes; +/- = Plus/minus; PPG = Power-play goals; SHG = Short-handed goals; GWG = Game-winning goals
Pos = Position;GP = Games played; Min, TOI = Minutes played; W = Wins; L = Losses; T,T/OT = Ties; OTL = Overtime losses; GA = Goals-against; GAA = Goals-against average; SO = Shutouts; SA = Shots against; SV = Shots saved;SV% = Save percentage;

== Draft picks ==
The 1982 NHL entry draft was held on June 9, 1982, at the held at the Montreal Forum in Montreal. The Boston Bruins held the 1st overall draft pick.

Pick #	Player	Position	Nationality	College/junior/club team
1	Gord Kluzak	Defense	Canada	Billings Bighorns (WHL)
22	Brian Curran	Defense	Canada	Portland (WHL)
39	Lyndon Byers	Right wing	Canada	Regina Pats (WHL)
60	Dave Reid	Left wing	Canada	Peterborough Petes (OHL)
102	Bob Nicholson	Defense	Canada	London Knights (OHL)
123	Bob Sweeney	Center	United States	Acton-Boxborough High School (USHS-MA)
144	John Meulenbroeks	Defense	Canada	Brantford Alexanders (OHL)
165	Tony Fiore	Center	Canada	Montreal Juniors (QMJHL)
186	Doug Kostynski	Center	Canada	Kamloops Blazers (WHL)
228	Tommy Lehmann	Center	Sweden	Stocksund (Sweden)
249	Bruno Campese	Goaltender	Canada	Northern Michigan University (CCHA)
^{Reference: "1982 NHL Entry Draft hockeydraftcentral.com".}

== See also ==
- 1982–83 NHL season
