= 1982–83 Hartford Whalers season =

Whalers' fourth season in the National Hockey League

1982–83 Hartford Whalers
- Division: 5th Adams
- Conference: 10th Wales
- 1982–83 record: 19–54–7
- Home record: 13–22–5
- Road record: 6–32–2
- Goals for: 261
- Goals against: 403

Team information
- General manager: Larry Pleau
- Coach: Larry Kish (12-32-5); Larry Pleau (4-13-1); John Cunniff (3-9-1)
- Captain: Russ Anderson
- Arena: Hartford Civic Center
- Average attendance: 10,586 (73.0%)
- Minor league affiliates: Binghamton Whalers (AHL); Saginaw Gears (IHL)

Team leaders
- Goals: Blaine Stoughton (45)
- Assists: Ron Francis (59)
- Points: Ron Francis (90)
- Penalty minutes: Greg Adams (216)
- Plus/minus: George Lyle (+5)
- Wins: Greg Millen (14)
- Goals against average: Greg Millen (4.82)

The 1982–83 Hartford Whalers season was the Whalers' fourth season in the National Hockey League (NHL). The Whalers failed to qualify for the post-season for the third consecutive season. Hartford finished the regular season with a 19–54–7 record, earning 45 points. The club finished 35 points behind the Quebec Nordiques for the fourth and final playoff spot in the Adams Division.

== Offseason ==
On June 2, the Whalers made a head coaching change, as Larry Pleau was replaced by Larry Kish. Kish had been the head coach of the Whalers AHL affiliate, the Binghamton Whalers, from 1980 to 1982. Kish led Binghamton to a 46–28–6 record, earning 98 points and first place in the Southern Division in 1981–82. In the post-season, Binghamton lost to the New Brunswick Hawks in the Calder Cup finals. Pleau remained with Hartford as director of hockey operations.

At the 1982 NHL entry draft held on June 9 at the Montreal Forum, the Whalers selected left winger Paul Lawless with their first round, 14th overall, draft pick. Lawless played with the Windsor Spitfires of the Ontario Hockey League during the 1981–82 season, in which in 68 games, he scored 24 goals and 49 points. Other notable picks by the Whalers included Kevin Dineen, Ray Ferraro and Ulf Samuelsson.

On June 30, Whalers captain Dave Keon retired. Keon joined the organization in 1976 when they played in the WHA and remained with the club after they joined the NHL in 1979. In three seasons and a half seasons with New England, Keon scored 60 goals and 166 points in 190 games. In three seasons with Hartford, Keon played in 234 games, scoring 31 goals and 128 points. Overall, in his NHL career, Keon played in 1296 games, scoring 396 goals and 986 points. In 92 playoff games, Keon scored 32 goals and 68 points, as well as winning the Stanley Cup four times with the Toronto Maple Leafs in 1962, 1963, 1964 and 1967.

On August 19, the Whalers were involved in a three-way deal with the Philadelphia Flyers and Edmonton Oilers. In the first part of the deal, the Whalers traded defenseman Mark Howe and a third round draft pick in the 1983 NHL entry draft to the Flyers for center Ken Linseman, Greg Adams, a first round pick in 1983 and a third round pick in 1983. Then Hartford dealt away Linseman and center Don Nachbaur to the Oilers in exchange for defenseman Risto Siltanen and Brent Loney. Adams saw limited action with the Flyers in 1981–82, playing in 33 games, as he scored four goals and 19 points. In 45 games with the Flyers AHL affiliate, the Maine Mariners, Adams scored 16 goals and 37 points in 45 games. Adams added three assists in four playoff games with Maine. With the Oilers in 1981–82, Siltanen scored 15 goals and 63 points in 63 games, and followed that up with three goals and five points in five post-season games. Loney was drafted by the Oilers earlier in the summer in the third round of the 1982 NHL entry draft. In 65 games with the Cornwall Royals of the OHL during the 1981–82 season, Loney scored 13 goals and 25 points.

Prior to the regular season starting, on October 1, the Whalers were involved in a three way deal with the New York Rangers and the Minnesota North Stars. The first trade was between the Whalers and North Stars, as Hartford acquired right winger Kent-Erik Andersson and center Mark Johnson from Minnesota for a fifth round draft pick in the 1984 NHL entry draft and future considerations. Hartford then traded Andersson to the Rangers for Ed Hospodar. Johnson split the 1981–82 season between the Pittsburgh Penguins and Minnesota North Stars, scoring 12 goals and 25 points in 56 games. In four playoff games with Minnesota, Johnson scored two goals. Hospodar appeared in 41 games with New York, scoring three goals and 11 points, while registering 153 penalty minutes.

On October 5, the Whalers acquired left winger Paul Marshall from the Toronto Maple Leafs in exchange for a tenth round draft pick in the 1983 NHL entry draft. Marshall played in 10 games with Toronto in 1981–82, scoring two goals and four points.

== Regular season ==
=== October ===
The Whalers opened the 1982–83 season on the road against the Montreal Canadiens at the Montreal Forum on October 6. Hartford took a 1–0 lead in the game after Pierre Larouche scored the Whalers first goal of the season, however, the Canadiens came back and won the game 2–1.

Three nights later, Hartford had their home opener, played against the Boston Bruins in front of 12,430 fans at the Civic Center. The Whalers took an early 3–0 lead, however, the Bruins staged a comeback, and won the game 5–4. The next night, the Whalers earned their first point of the season, a 4–4 tie against the Buffalo Sabres.

After the Whalers winless streak was extended to four games after a tie against the Edmonton Oilers, the team finally won their first game of the season on October 16 against the Vancouver Canucks 6–5. Pierre Larouche led the way for the Whalers, as he scored a hat trick in the victory.

Hartford would struggle for the rest of the month, earning only one more victory, as the club posted a 2–6–2 record in October, earning six points, and was in last place in the Adams Division, five points behind the Buffalo Sabres for the fourth and final playoff position.

=== November ===
The Whalers would get off to a slow start in November, losing three of their first four games, before winning consecutive games for the first time all season, defeating the Quebec Nordiques 7-5 and the St. Louis Blues 5–2.

Following the two game winning streak, the team would end the month of November on a six-game winless skid (0–5–1), which included a humiliating 8–0 loss to the Boston Bruins on November 27.

The Whalers ended the month with a 3–8–1 record in 12 games, and a 5–14–3 record on the season, remaining in last place in the Adams Division, 13 points behind the Quebec Nordiques for fourth place.

=== December ===
After dropping their first two games of the month, and extending their overall winless streak to eight games (0–7–1), the Whalers finally earned a victory, defeating the New York Rangers 5–2 at the Civic Center. Two nights later, the Whalers were blown out against the Montreal Canadiens, losing 11–2.

After their blowout loss to Montreal, the Whalers rebounded in their next game, defeating the Canadiens by a 7–4 score, which started a five-game unbeaten streak (4–0–1). On December 17, the Whalers Mike Veisor stopped all 33 shots he faced against the Winnipeg Jets in a 2–0 Hartford win.

The shutout win against the Jets was the Whalers last victory of the month, as the team lost their next five games, before earning a tie against the Washington Capitals in their final game of December.

The Whalers had a 5–8–2 record in 15 games in December, bringing their overall season record to 10–22–5, earning 25 points, and in the cellar of the Adams Division, as Hartford was 15 points behind the fourth place Quebec Nordiques.

=== January ===
The Whalers losing ways continued into January, as the club lost their first six games of the month, extending their winless streak to 12 games (0–11–1). On January 13, the Whalers won their first game in nearly a month, as they defeated the Montreal Canadiens 4–2 at the Civic Center. Two nights later, the club extended their winning streak to two, as Hartford beat the New Jersey Devils 2–1, with goaltender Greg Millen making 29 saves for the win.

Following a 4–2 loss to the Chicago Black Hawks on January 23, the Whalers fired head coach Larry Kish, and replaced him with Larry Pleau. Kish led the Whalers to a 12–32–5 record in 49 games.

Under Pleau, the Whalers won their first game, 5–2 against the Quebec Nordiques, ending their four-game losing streak, followed by a 2–2 tie against the Winnipeg Jets to finish the month of January.

The Whalers finished the month with a 3–10–1 record in 14 games, and an overall record of 13–32–6, getting 32 points, and were now 22 points behind the fourth place Quebec Nordiques for the last playoff spot in the Adams Division.

=== February ===
Hartford started off February on a sour note, as they lost 12–3 against the Quebec Nordiques, setting a club record for goals allowed in a game. That loss was the first in a four-game losing streak. The Whalers snapped their losing streak with a 4–2 win over the defending Stanley Cup champions, the New York Islanders on the road. Hartford's Mark Johnson was the star of the game, as he recorded a hat trick.

The Whalers won their next game, a 5-3 decision over the Toronto Maple Leafs to extend their winning streak to two. After a loss against the Los Angeles Kings by a 5–2 score, Hartford would defeat the Montreal Canadiens 4–1, posting a 3–1–0 record in their past four games.

The team then lost their final five games of the month, including a loss by an 11–3 score to the New York Rangers on February 23.

Hartford had another losing month, going 3-10-0 in 13 games, falling to 16-42-6 for the season, earning 38 points, and 28 points behind the Quebec Nordiques for the fourth and final playoff position in the Adams Division.

=== March/April ===
After dropping their first three games of March, the Whalers replaced head coach Larry Pleau with John Cunniff. Pleau coached the Whalers to a 4–13–1 record in 18 games.

In his first game as the Whalers head coach, Cunniff lost to the Edmonton Oilers 9–4, a game in which Wayne Gretzky scored a hat trick and an assist for four points. In his next game against the New Jersey Devils, the Whalers shutout the Devils by a 3–0 score, as Greg Millen made 23 saves, earning his first win as a head coach.

Wins would be scarce for Hartford for the rest of the season, as the team went 2-8-1 in their remaining 11 games, finishing the season with a 19–54–7 record, earning a franchise season low 45 points. The Whalers finished in last place in the Adams Division, 35 points behind the Quebec Nordiques for the fourth and final playoff position.

=== Final standings ===
Adams Division
	GP	W	L	T	GF	GA	Pts
**Boston Bruins**	80	50	20	10	327	228	110
**Montreal Canadiens**	80	42	24	14	350	286	98
**Buffalo Sabres**	80	38	29	13	318	285	89
**Quebec Nordiques**	80	34	34	12	343	336	80
Hartford Whalers	80	19	54	7	261	403	45

Note: GP = Games played, W = Wins, L = Losses, T = Ties, Pts = Points, GF = Goals for, GA = Goals against
Note: Teams that qualified for the playoffs are highlighted in bold.

=== Record vs. opponents ===
Adams Division record vs. opponents

==== Vs. Wales Conference ====
**Vs. Adams Division**

1982–83 NHL records
Team	**BOS**	**BUF**	**HFD**	**MTL**	**QUE**	**Total**
Boston	—	5–3	6–2	3–3–2	5–2–1	**19–10–3**
Buffalo	3–5	—	5–2–1	3–3–2	3–3–2	**14–13–5**
Hartford	2–6	2–5–1	—	3–5	2–6	**9–22–1**
Montreal	3–3–2	3–3–2	5–3	—	5–2–1	**16–11–5**
Quebec	2–5–1	3–3–2	6–2	2–5–1	—	**13–15–4**

**Vs. Patrick Division**

1982–83 NHL records
Team	**NJD**	**NYI**	**NYR**	**PHI**	**PIT**	**WSH**	**Total**
Boston	1−0−2	2−0−1	3−0	2−0−1	2−1	0−3	**10−4−4**
Buffalo	2−0−1	2−1	2−0−1	2−1	1−1−1	3−0	**12−3−3**
Hartford	2–1	1–2	1–2	1–2	0–3	0−2−1	**5−12−1**
Montreal	2−1	0−1−2	2–1	2−1	2−1	1−0−2	**9−5−4**
Quebec	2−1	1−1–1	2–1	0−3	3−0	1−1−1	**9−7−2**

==== Vs. Campbell Conference ====
**Vs. Norris Division**

1982–83 NHL records
Team	**CHI**	**DET**	**MIN**	**STL**	**TOR**	**Total**
Boston	3–0	3–0	3–0	3–0	2–1	**14–1–0**
Buffalo	1−1−1	1−1−1	0−2−1	2−1	0−2−1	**4−7−4**
Hartford	0–3	0–3	0−2−1	1–2	1–2	**2–12–1**
Montreal	0–3	1−0–2	3–0	2–0–1	0−1–2	**6–4–5**
Quebec	1–2	1–1–1	2–1	1–1–1	1–1–1	**6–6–3**

**Vs. Smythe Division**

1982–83 NHL records
Team	**CGY**	**EDM**	**LAK**	**VAN**	**WIN**	**Total**
Boston	2−0−1	2−0−1	1−2	2−1	0−2−1	**7−5−3**
Buffalo	2−1	1–2	2−1	1−1−1	2−1	**8−6−1**
Hartford	0−1–2	0–2–1	1–2	1–2	1–1–1	**3–8–4**
Montreal	2−1	1−2	2−1	3–0	3−0	**11−4−0**
Quebec	2−0−1	1−1−1	1−1−1	0−3	2−1	**6−6−3**

== Schedule and results ==
1982–83 regular season
October

Game	Result	Date	Score	Opponent	Record	Attendance
1	L	October 6, 1982	1–2	@ Montreal Canadiens (1982–83)	0–1–0	16,096
2	L	October 9, 1982	4–5	Boston Bruins (1982–83)	0–2–0	12,430
3	T	October 10, 1982	4–4	@ Buffalo Sabres (1982–83)	0–2–1	11,113
4	T	October 14, 1982	4–4	Edmonton Oilers (1982–83)	0–2–2	10,894
5	W	October 16, 1982	6–5	Vancouver Canucks (1982–83)	1–2–2	9,971
6	L	October 20, 1982	2–4	@ Edmonton Oilers (1982–83)	1–3–2	17,498
7	L	October 21, 1982	3–10	@ Calgary Flames (1982–83)	1–4–2	7,242
8	W	October 23, 1982	5–3	@ Los Angeles Kings (1982–83)	2–4–2	11,622
9	L	October 26, 1982	1–8	@ Vancouver Canucks (1982–83)	2–5–2	11,769
10	L	October 30, 1982	2–4	Detroit Red Wings (1982–83)	2–6–2	11,123

November

Game	Result	Date	Score	Opponent	Record	Attendance
11	L	November 2, 1982	6–7	Minnesota North Stars (1982–83)	2–7–2	9,198
12	W	November 4, 1982	5–2	@ Boston Bruins (1982–83)	3–7–2	10,685
13	L	November 6, 1982	2–5	Buffalo Sabres (1982–83)	3–8–2	11,080
14	L	November 7, 1982	2–6	@ Washington Capitals (1982–83)	3–9–2	12,816
15	W	November 10, 1982	7–5	Quebec Nordiques (1982–83)	4–9–2	9,909
16	W	November 13, 1982	5–2	St. Louis Blues (1982–83)	5–9–2	11,407
17	L	November 16, 1982	1–7	Montreal Canadiens (1982–83)	5–10–2	11,653
18	L	November 17, 1982	3–4	@ Pittsburgh Penguins (1982–83)	5–11–2	6,278
19	T	November 20, 1982	4–4	Calgary Flames (1982–83)	5–11–3	10,467
20	L	November 24, 1982	2–4	Buffalo Sabres (1982–83)	5–12–3	9,506
21	L	November 26, 1982	3–4	Chicago Black Hawks (1982–83)	5–13–3	11,083
22	L	November 27, 1982	0–8	@ Boston Bruins (1982–83)	5–14–3	12,023

December

Game	Result	Date	Score	Opponent	Record	Attendance
23	L	December 1, 1982	1–6	@ New York Rangers (1982–83)	5–15–3	17,414
24	L	December 3, 1982	4–5	@ New Jersey Devils (1982–83)	5–16–3	12,428
25	W	December 4, 1982	5–2	New York Rangers (1982–83)	6–16–3	14,374
26	L	December 6, 1982	2–11	@ Montreal Canadiens (1982–83)	6–17–3	15,356
27	W	December 8, 1982	7–4	Montreal Canadiens (1982–83)	7–17–3	9,568
28	W	December 11, 1982	7–4	Philadelphia Flyers (1982–83)	8–17–3	10,350
29	W	December 12, 1982	3–1	@ Buffalo Sabres (1982–83)	9–17–3	11,616
30	T	December 14, 1982	3–3	@ Minnesota North Stars (1982–83)	9–17–4	12,304
31	W	December 17, 1982	2–0	@ Winnipeg Jets (1982–83)	10–17–4	10,561
32	L	December 18, 1982	4–7	@ St. Louis Blues (1982–83)	10–18–4	10,889
33	L	December 21, 1982	2–3	Pittsburgh Penguins (1982–83)	10–19–4	12,722
34	L	December 23, 1982	1–5	Boston Bruins (1982–83)	10–20–4	11,514
35	L	December 26, 1982	2–3	New York Islanders (1982–83)	10–21–4	14,270
36	L	December 28, 1982	1–4	@ Quebec Nordiques (1982–83)	10–22–4	15,236
37	T	December 30, 1982	4–4	Washington Capitals (1982–83)	10–22–5	11,385

January

Game	Result	Date	Score	Opponent	Record	Attendance
38	L	January 1, 1983	5–7	@ Toronto Maple Leafs (1982–83)	10–23–5	16,382
39	L	January 2, 1983	4–8	@ Buffalo Sabres (1982–83)	10–24–5	11,220
40	L	January 6, 1983	4–6	Vancouver Canucks (1982–83)	10–25–5	9,130
41	L	January 8, 1983	4–7	Philadelphia Flyers (1982–83)	10–26–5	11,123
42	L	January 9, 1983	4–8	@ Philadelphia Flyers (1982–83)	10–27–5	16,912
43	L	January 11, 1983	4–8	@ Montreal Canadiens (1982–83)	10–28–5	15,762
44	W	January 13, 1983	4–2	Montreal Canadiens (1982–83)	11–28–5	9,776
45	W	January 15, 1983	2–1	New Jersey Devils (1982–83)	12–28–5	9,200
46	L	January 18, 1983	1–8	@ New York Islanders (1982–83)	12–29–5	15,172
47	L	January 20, 1983	3–4	@ Los Angeles Kings (1982–83)	12–30–5	9,094
48	L	January 22, 1983	2–7	@ Minnesota North Stars (1982–83)	12–31–5	15,416
49	L	January 23, 1983	2–4	@ Chicago Black Hawks (1982–83)	12–32–5	17,436
50	W	January 27, 1983	5–2	Quebec Nordiques (1982–83)	13–32–5	11,061
51	T	January 29, 1983	2–2	Winnipeg Jets (1982–83)	13–32–6	10,416

February

Game	Result	Date	Score	Opponent	Record	Attendance
52	L	February 1, 1983	3–12	@ Quebec Nordiques (1982–83)	13–33–6	15,190
53	L	February 2, 1983	1–7	@ Toronto Maple Leafs (1982–83)	13–34–6	16,195
54	L	February 5, 1983	4–7	@ Boston Bruins (1982–83)	13–35–6	12,188
55	L	February 9, 1983	5–6	Detroit Red Wings (1982–83)	13–36–6	9,316
56	W	February 12, 1983	4–2	@ New York Islanders (1982–83)	14–36–6	15,060
57	W	February 13, 1983	5–3	Toronto Maple Leafs (1982–83)	15–36–6	9,046
58	L	February 15, 1983	2–5	Los Angeles Kings (1982–83)	15–37–6	8,116
59	W	February 17, 1983	4–1	Montreal Canadiens (1982–83)	16–37–6	9,275
60	L	February 19, 1983	2–4	Chicago Black Hawks (1982–83)	16–38–6	11,174
61	L	February 20, 1983	2–7	@ Detroit Red Wings (1982–83)	16–39–6	12,806
62	L	February 23, 1983	3–11	@ New York Rangers (1982–83)	16–40–6	17,414
63	L	February 25, 1983	3–5	@ Winnipeg Jets (1982–83)	16–41–6	11,828
64	L	February 27, 1983	3–4	Boston Bruins (1982–83)	16–42–6	14,146

March

Game	Result	Date	Score	Opponent	Record	Attendance
65	L	March 1, 1983	5–6	Buffalo Sabres (1982–83)	16–43–6	8,725
66	L	March 5, 1983	3–10	@ Quebec Nordiques (1982–83)	16–44–6	15,240
67	L	March 6, 1983	3–7	Quebec Nordiques (1982–83)	16–45–6	9,321
68	L	March 8, 1983	4–9	Edmonton Oilers (1982–83)	16–46–6	11,863
69	W	March 10, 1983	3–0	@ New Jersey Devils (1982–83)	17–46–6	10,206
70	L	March 12, 1983	2–7	Pittsburgh Penguins (1982–83)	17–47–6	10,879
71	L	March 15, 1983	1–5	@ Montreal Canadiens (1982–83)	17–48–6	15,486
72	L	March 16, 1983	4–5	@ Washington Capitals (1982–83)	17–49–6	8,980
73	T	March 20, 1983	2–2	Calgary Flames (1982–83)	17–49–7	9,734
74	L	March 22, 1983	1–4	St. Louis Blues (1982–83)	17–50–7	9,436
75	L	March 23, 1983	3–8	@ Buffalo Sabres (1982–83)	17–51–7	11,838
76	L	March 26, 1983	4–7	@ Boston Bruins (1982–83)	17–52–7	13,607
77	W	March 27, 1983	5–1	Boston Bruins (1982–83)	18–52–7	12,805
78	W	March 29, 1983	5–4	Buffalo Sabres (1982–83)	19–52–7	9,258

April

Game	Result	Date	Score	Opponent	Record	Attendance
79	L	April 2, 1983	4–5	Quebec Nordiques (1982–83)	19–53–7	11,142
80	L	April 3, 1983	5–6	@ Quebec Nordiques (1982–83)	19–54–7	15,132

Legend: Win (2 points) Loss (0 points) Tie (1 point)

== Transactions ==
The Whalers were involved in the following transactions during the 1982–83 season.

=== Trades ===
August 19, 1982	To Philadelphia Flyers Mark Howe; 3rd round pick in 1983 – Derrick Smith	To Hartford Whalers Ken Linseman; Greg Adams; 1st round pick in 1983 – David Jensen; 3rd round pick in 1983 – Leif Carlsson
August 19, 1982	To Edmonton Oilers Ken Linseman; Don Nachbaur	To Hartford Whalers Risto Siltanen; Brent Loney
October 1, 1982	To Minnesota North Stars 5th round pick in 1984 – Jiri Poner; Future Considerations (Jordy Douglas)	To Hartford Whalers Mark Johnson; Kent-Erik Andersson
October 1, 1982	To New York Rangers Kent-Erik Andersson	To Hartford Whalers Ed Hospodar
October 1, 1982	To Boston Bruins Marty Howe	To Hartford Whalers Future Considerations
October 5, 1982	To Toronto Maple Leafs 10th round pick in 1983 – Greg Rolston	To Hartford Whalers Paul Marshall
October 15, 1982	To New Jersey Devils Garry Howatt; Rick Meagher	To Hartford Whalers Merlin Malinowski; Scott Fusco
December 3, 1982	To Quebec Nordiques Blake Wesley	To Hartford Whalers Pierre Lacroix

=== Free agents ===
Player / Former team; Archie Henderson / Minnesota North Stars	Player / New team; Glenn Merkosky / New Jersey Devils

== Draft picks ==
Hartford's draft picks from the 1982 NHL entry draft which was held at the Montreal Forum in Montreal on June 9, 1982.

Round	#	Player	Nationality	College/junior/club team (league)
1	14	Paul Lawless	Canada	Windsor Spitfires (OHL)
2	35	Mark Paterson	Canada	Ottawa 67's (OHL)
3	56	Kevin Dineen	Canada	University of Denver (WCHA)
4	67	Ulf Samuelsson	Sweden	Leksands IF (SEL)
5	88	Ray Ferraro	Canada	Penticton Knights (BCJHL)
6	109	Randy Gilhen	Canada	Winnipeg Warriors (WHL)
7	130	Jim Johannson	United States	Rochester Mayo High School (Minnesota)
8	151	Mickey Krampotich	United States	Hibbing High School (Minnesota)
9	172	Kevin Skilliter	Canada	Cornwall Royals (OHL)
11	214	Martin Linse	Sweden	Djurgårdens IF (SEL)
12	235	Randy Cameron	Canada	Winnipeg Warriors (WHL)

== See also ==
- 1982–83 NHL season
