= 1982–83 Buffalo Sabres season =

NHL hockey team season

1982–83 Buffalo Sabres
- Division: 3rd Adams
- Conference: 6th Wales
- 1982–83 record: 38–29–13
- Home record: 25–7–8
- Road record: 13–22–5
- Goals for: 318
- Goals against: 285

Team information
- General manager: Scotty Bowman
- Coach: Scotty Bowman
- Captain: Gilbert Perreault
- Alternate captains: None
- Arena: Buffalo Memorial Auditorium
- Average attendance: 12,894

Team leaders
- Goals: Tony McKegney (36)
- Assists: Phil Housley (47)
- Points: Gilbert Perreault (76)
- Penalty minutes: Larry Playfair (180)
- Wins: Bob Sauve (25)
- Goals against average: Bob Sauve (3.46)

The 1982–83 Buffalo Sabres season was the 13th season for the National Hockey League (NHL) franchise that was established on May 22, 1970.

== Regular season ==
=== Final standings ===
Adams Division
	GP	W	L	T	GF	GA	Pts
**Boston Bruins**	80	50	20	10	327	228	110
**Montreal Canadiens**	80	42	24	14	350	286	98
**Buffalo Sabres**	80	38	29	13	318	285	89
**Quebec Nordiques**	80	34	34	12	343	336	80
Hartford Whalers	80	19	54	7	261	403	45

Note: GP = Games played, W = Wins, L = Losses, T = Ties, Pts = Points, GF = Goals for, GA = Goals against
Note: Teams that qualified for the playoffs are highlighted in bold.

=== Record vs. opponents ===
Adams Division record vs. opponents

==== Vs. Wales Conference ====
**Vs. Adams Division**

1982–83 NHL records
Team	**BOS**	**BUF**	**HFD**	**MTL**	**QUE**	**Total**
Boston	—	5–3	6–2	3–3–2	5–2–1	**19–10–3**
Buffalo	3–5	—	5–2–1	3–3–2	3–3–2	**14–13–5**
Hartford	2–6	2–5–1	—	3–5	2–6	**9–22–1**
Montreal	3–3–2	3–3–2	5–3	—	5–2–1	**16–11–5**
Quebec	2–5–1	3–3–2	6–2	2–5–1	—	**13–15–4**

**Vs. Patrick Division**

1982–83 NHL records
Team	**NJD**	**NYI**	**NYR**	**PHI**	**PIT**	**WSH**	**Total**
Boston	1−0−2	2−0−1	3−0	2−0−1	2−1	0−3	**10−4−4**
Buffalo	2−0−1	2−1	2−0−1	2−1	1−1−1	3−0	**12−3−3**
Hartford	2–1	1–2	1–2	1–2	0–3	0−2−1	**5−12−1**
Montreal	2−1	0−1−2	2–1	2−1	2−1	1−0−2	**9−5−4**
Quebec	2−1	1−1–1	2–1	0−3	3−0	1−1−1	**9−7−2**

==== Vs. Campbell Conference ====
**Vs. Norris Division**

1982–83 NHL records
Team	**CHI**	**DET**	**MIN**	**STL**	**TOR**	**Total**
Boston	3–0	3–0	3–0	3–0	2–1	**14–1–0**
Buffalo	1−1−1	1−1−1	0−2−1	2−1	0−2−1	**4−7−4**
Hartford	0–3	0–3	0−2−1	1–2	1–2	**2–12–1**
Montreal	0–3	1−0–2	3–0	2–0–1	0−1–2	**6–4–5**
Quebec	1–2	1–1–1	2–1	1–1–1	1–1–1	**6–6–3**

**Vs. Smythe Division**

1982–83 NHL records
Team	**CGY**	**EDM**	**LAK**	**VAN**	**WIN**	**Total**
Boston	2−0−1	2−0−1	1−2	2−1	0−2−1	**7−5−3**
Buffalo	2−1	1–2	2−1	1−1−1	2−1	**8−6−1**
Hartford	0−1–2	0–2–1	1–2	1–2	1–1–1	**3–8–4**
Montreal	2−1	1−2	2−1	3–0	3−0	**11−4−0**
Quebec	2−0−1	1−1−1	1−1−1	0−3	2−1	**6−6−3**

== Schedule and results ==
1982–83 regular season
October

Game	Result	Date	Score	Opponent	Record
1	L	October 6, 1982	4–6	Quebec Nordiques (1982–83)	0–1–0
2	L	October 9, 1982	4–6	@ Quebec Nordiques (1982–83)	0–2–0
3	T	October 10, 1982	4–4	Hartford Whalers (1982–83)	0–2–1
4	L	October 14, 1982	2–4	@ Philadelphia Flyers (1982–83)	0–3–1
5	W	October 16, 1982	9–2	@ Washington Capitals (1982–83)	1–3–1
6	W	October 17, 1982	6–4	Edmonton Oilers (1982–83)	2–3–1
7	L	October 20, 1982	0–4	@ Chicago Black Hawks (1982–83)	2–4–1
8	L	October 23, 1982	2–6	@ Detroit Red Wings (1982–83)	2–5–1
9	W	October 24, 1982	6–2	St. Louis Blues (1982–83)	3–5–1
10	T	October 26, 1982	7–7	@ Montreal Canadiens (1982–83)	3–5–2
11	T	October 30, 1982	3–3	@ Toronto Maple Leafs (1982–83)	3–5–3
12	W	October 31, 1982	3–1	Montreal Canadiens (1982–83)	4–5–3

November

Game	Result	Date	Score	Opponent	Record
13	L	November 3, 1982	2–3	Boston Bruins (1982–83)	4–6–3
14	W	November 6, 1982	5–2	@ Hartford Whalers (1982–83)	5–6–3
15	W	November 7, 1982	3–1	Vancouver Canucks (1982–83)	6–6–3
16	W	November 10, 1982	7–2	Philadelphia Flyers (1982–83)	7–6–3
17	L	November 13, 1982	2–3	@ Boston Bruins (1982–83)	7–7–3
18	T	November 14, 1982	6–6	Pittsburgh Penguins (1982–83)	7–7–4
19	W	November 17, 1982	7–2	@ Winnipeg Jets (1982–83)	8–7–4
20	L	November 18, 1982	1–2	@ Minnesota North Stars (1982–83)	8–8–4
21	W	November 20, 1982	5–2	@ Los Angeles Kings (1982–83)	9–8–4
22	W	November 24, 1982	4–2	@ Hartford Whalers (1982–83)	10–8–4
23	W	November 26, 1982	8–6	St. Louis Blues (1982–83)	11–8–4
24	W	November 28, 1982	7–3	New York Rangers (1982–83)	12–8–4

December

Game	Result	Date	Score	Opponent	Record
25	T	December 1, 1982	2–2	Montreal Canadiens (1982–83)	12–8–5
26	L	December 4, 1982	2–3	@ Quebec Nordiques (1982–83)	12–9–5
27	T	December 5, 1982	3–3	Chicago Black Hawks (1982–83)	12–9–6
28	L	December 8, 1982	2–4	@ Pittsburgh Penguins (1982–83)	12–10–6
29	L	December 11, 1982	2–3	@ Montreal Canadiens (1982–83)	12–11–6
30	L	December 12, 1982	1–3	Hartford Whalers (1982–83)	12–12–6
31	W	December 14, 1982	5–3	@ New York Islanders (1982–83)	13–12–6
32	L	December 16, 1982	1–8	@ Boston Bruins (1982–83)	13–13–6
33	W	December 18, 1982	5–4	@ Quebec Nordiques (1982–83)	14–13–6
34	W	December 19, 1982	3–1	Quebec Nordiques (1982–83)	15–13–6
35	W	December 22, 1982	3–1	@ New York Rangers (1982–83)	16–13–6
36	T	December 26, 1982	2–2	Detroit Red Wings (1982–83)	16–13–7
37	W	December 31, 1982	5–1	New York Islanders (1982–83)	17–13–7

January

Game	Result	Date	Score	Opponent	Record
38	W	January 2, 1983	8–4	Hartford Whalers (1982–83)	18–13–7
39	L	January 4, 1983	2–5	@ New York Islanders (1982–83)	18–14–7
40	T	January 5, 1983	3–3	@ New York Rangers (1982–83)	18–14–8
41	T	January 7, 1983	5–5	Vancouver Canucks (1982–83)	18–14–9
42	W	January 9, 1983	7–2	Los Angeles Kings (1982–83)	19–14–9
43	W	January 12, 1983	2–1	Quebec Nordiques (1982–83)	20–14–9
44	W	January 14, 1983	3–2	Washington Capitals (1982–83)	21–14–9
45	W	January 15, 1983	4–2	@ Washington Capitals (1982–83)	22–14–9
46	L	January 20, 1983	0–4	@ Boston Bruins (1982–83)	22–15–9
47	L	January 22, 1983	1–4	@ Montreal Canadiens (1982–83)	22–16–9
48	W	January 23, 1983	5–2	Winnipeg Jets (1982–83)	23–16–9
49	W	January 26, 1983	7–3	Montreal Canadiens (1982–83)	24–16–9
50	W	January 28, 1983	6–2	Chicago Black Hawks (1982–83)	25–16–9
51	L	January 29, 1983	3–5	@ Toronto Maple Leafs (1982–83)	25–17–9

February

Game	Result	Date	Score	Opponent	Record
52	T	February 2, 1983	2–2	Minnesota North Stars (1982–83)	25–17–10
53	T	February 5, 1983	0–0	@ Quebec Nordiques (1982–83)	25–17–11
54	L	February 6, 1983	1–5	Boston Bruins (1982–83)	25–18–11
55	L	February 10, 1983	2–7	@ Los Angeles Kings (1982–83)	25–19–11
56	L	February 12, 1983	2–4	@ Calgary Flames (1982–83)	25–20–11
57	L	February 14, 1983	4–6	@ St. Louis Blues (1982–83)	25–21–11
58	W	February 16, 1983	3–1	Boston Bruins (1982–83)	26–21–11
59	W	February 18, 1983	5–1	Calgary Flames (1982–83)	27–21–11
60	L	February 20, 1983	4–5	Edmonton Oilers (1982–83)	27–22–11
61	T	February 21, 1983	4–4	@ New Jersey Devils (1982–83)	27–22–12
62	W	February 23, 1983	4–2	Philadelphia Flyers (1982–83)	28–22–12
63	W	February 25, 1983	7–6	Boston Bruins (1982–83)	29–22–12
64	W	February 27, 1983	6–2	New Jersey Devils (1982–83)	30–22–12

March

Game	Result	Date	Score	Opponent	Record
65	W	March 1, 1983	6–5	@ Hartford Whalers (1982–83)	31–22–12
66	W	March 3, 1983	3–2	@ Boston Bruins (1982–83)	32–22–12
67	W	March 4, 1983	10–2	Pittsburgh Penguins (1982–83)	33–22–12
68	W	March 6, 1983	6–4	Detroit Red Wings (1982–83)	34–22–12
69	L	March 8, 1983	1–5	@ Minnesota North Stars (1982–83)	34–23–12
70	L	March 9, 1983	0–6	@ Winnipeg Jets (1982–83)	34–24–12
71	L	March 12, 1983	3–8	@ Vancouver Canucks (1982–83)	34–25–12
72	L	March 13, 1983	2–6	@ Edmonton Oilers (1982–83)	34–26–12
73	W	March 16, 1983	5–3	Calgary Flames (1982–83)	35–26–12
74	W	March 19, 1983	6–4	@ Montreal Canadiens (1982–83)	36–26–12
75	L	March 20, 1983	4–7	Montreal Canadiens (1982–83)	36–27–12
76	W	March 23, 1983	8–3	Hartford Whalers (1982–83)	37–27–12
77	T	March 27, 1983	6–6	Quebec Nordiques (1982–83)	37–27–13
78	L	March 29, 1983	4–5	@ Hartford Whalers (1982–83)	37–28–13
79	W	March 31, 1983	8–5	@ New Jersey Devils (1982–83)	38–28–13

April

Game	Result	Date	Score	Opponent	Record
80	L	April 3, 1983	3–4	Toronto Maple Leafs (1982–83)	38–29–13

Legend: Win (2 points) Loss (0 points) Tie (1 point)

== Playoffs ==
Sabres defeat the Montreal Canadiens in the Adams Division Semifinals, in a three-game sweep.

They lose to the Boston Bruins in the Adams Division finals, three games to four.

== Draft picks ==
Buffalo's draft picks at the 1982 NHL entry draft held at the Montreal Forum in Montreal.

Round	#	Player	Nationality	College/Junior/Club team (League)
1	6	Phil Housley	United States	South St. Paul High School (USHS-MN)
1	9	Paul Cyr	Canada	Victoria Cougars (WHL)
1	16	Dave Andreychuk	Canada	Oshawa Generals (OHL)
2	26	Mike Anderson	United States	North St. Paul High School (USHS-MN)
2	30	Jens Johansson	Sweden	Pitea (Sweden)
4	68	Timo Jutila	Finland	Tampere Tappara (Finland)
4	79	Jeff Hamilton	Canada	Providence College (ECAC)
5	100	Bob Logan	Canada	West Island Royals (LHJAQ)
6	111	Jeff Parker	United States	Mariner High School (USHS-MN)
6	121	Jakob Gustavsson	Sweden	Almtuna (Sweden)
7	142	Allen Bishop	Canada	Niagara Falls Flyers (OHL)
8	163	Claude Verret	Canada	Trois-Rivières Draveurs (QMJHL)
9	184	Rob Norman	Canada	Cornwall Royals (OHL)
10	205	Mike Craig	Canada	Billings Bighorns (WHL)
11	226	Jim Plankers	United States	Cloquet High School (USHS-MN)

== See also ==
- 1982–83 NHL season
