= 1982–83 Montreal Canadiens season =

NHL hockey team season

1982–83 Montreal Canadiens
- Division: 2nd Adams
- Conference: 3rd Wales
- 1982–83 record: 42–24–14
- Home record: 25–6–9
- Road record: 17–18–5
- Goals for: 350
- Goals against: 286

Team information
- General manager: Irving Grundman
- Coach: Bob Berry
- Captain: Bob Gainey
- Alternate captains: None
- Arena: Montreal Forum

Team leaders
- Goals: Mark Napier (40)
- Assists: Guy Lafleur; Larry Robinson (49)
- Points: Guy Lafleur (76)
- Penalty minutes: Chris Nilan (213)
- Plus/minus: Mats Naslund (+34)
- Wins: Rick Wamsley (27)
- Goals against average: Richard Sevigny (3.44)

The 1982–83 Montreal Canadiens season was the team's 74th season. The season involved being eliminated in the Adams Division semi-finals vs the Buffalo Sabres 3 games to 0. The Habs finished the regular season with a 42-24–14 record, but for the first time since 1974, they did not win their division.

== Regular season ==
=== Final standings ===
Adams Division
	GP	W	L	T	GF	GA	Pts
**Boston Bruins**	80	50	20	10	327	228	110
**Montreal Canadiens**	80	42	24	14	350	286	98
**Buffalo Sabres**	80	38	29	13	318	285	89
**Quebec Nordiques**	80	34	34	12	343	336	80
Hartford Whalers	80	19	54	7	261	403	45

Note: GP = Games played, W = Wins, L = Losses, T = Ties, Pts = Points, GF = Goals for, GA = Goals against
Note: Teams that qualified for the playoffs are highlighted in bold.

=== Record vs. opponents ===
Adams Division record vs. opponents

==== Vs. Wales Conference ====
**Vs. Adams Division**

1982–83 NHL records
Team	**BOS**	**BUF**	**HFD**	**MTL**	**QUE**	**Total**
Boston	—	5–3	6–2	3–3–2	5–2–1	**19–10–3**
Buffalo	3–5	—	5–2–1	3–3–2	3–3–2	**14–13–5**
Hartford	2–6	2–5–1	—	3–5	2–6	**9–22–1**
Montreal	3–3–2	3–3–2	5–3	—	5–2–1	**16–11–5**
Quebec	2–5–1	3–3–2	6–2	2–5–1	—	**13–15–4**

**Vs. Patrick Division**

1982–83 NHL records
Team	**NJD**	**NYI**	**NYR**	**PHI**	**PIT**	**WSH**	**Total**
Boston	1−0−2	2−0−1	3−0	2−0−1	2−1	0−3	**10−4−4**
Buffalo	2−0−1	2−1	2−0−1	2−1	1−1−1	3−0	**12−3−3**
Hartford	2–1	1–2	1–2	1–2	0–3	0−2−1	**5−12−1**
Montreal	2−1	0−1−2	2–1	2−1	2−1	1−0−2	**9−5−4**
Quebec	2−1	1−1–1	2–1	0−3	3−0	1−1−1	**9−7−2**

==== Vs. Campbell Conference ====
**Vs. Norris Division**

1982–83 NHL records
Team	**CHI**	**DET**	**MIN**	**STL**	**TOR**	**Total**
Boston	3–0	3–0	3–0	3–0	2–1	**14–1–0**
Buffalo	1−1−1	1−1−1	0−2−1	2−1	0−2−1	**4−7−4**
Hartford	0–3	0–3	0−2−1	1–2	1–2	**2–12–1**
Montreal	0–3	1−0–2	3–0	2–0–1	0−1–2	**6–4–5**
Quebec	1–2	1–1–1	2–1	1–1–1	1–1–1	**6–6–3**

**Vs. Smythe Division**

1982–83 NHL records
Team	**CGY**	**EDM**	**LAK**	**VAN**	**WIN**	**Total**
Boston	2−0−1	2−0−1	1−2	2−1	0−2−1	**7−5−3**
Buffalo	2−1	1–2	2−1	1−1−1	2−1	**8−6−1**
Hartford	0−1–2	0–2–1	1–2	1–2	1–1–1	**3–8–4**
Montreal	2−1	1−2	2−1	3–0	3−0	**11−4−0**
Quebec	2−0−1	1−1−1	1−1−1	0−3	2−1	**6−6−3**

== Schedule and results ==
1982–83 regular season
October

Game	Result	Date	Score	Opponent	Record
1	W	October 6, 1982	2–1	Hartford Whalers (1982–83)	1–0–0
2	W	October 7, 1982	5–1	@ Boston Bruins (1982–83)	2–0–0
3	L	October 9, 1982	7–8	Chicago Black Hawks (1982–83)	2–1–0
4	W	October 11, 1982	4–3	@ Quebec Nordiques (1982–83)	3–1–0
5	W	October 14, 1982	5–3	@ New Jersey Devils (1982–83)	4–1–0
6	W	October 16, 1982	8–2	New York Rangers (1982–83)	5–1–0
7	T	October 20, 1982	3–3	@ Washington Capitals (1982–83)	5–1–1
8	W	October 21, 1982	2–1	@ Philadelphia Flyers (1982–83)	6–1–1
9	W	October 23, 1982	9–5	Quebec Nordiques (1982–83)	7–1–1
10	T	October 26, 1982	7–7	Buffalo Sabres (1982–83)	7–1–2
11	T	October 30, 1982	4–4	Boston Bruins (1982–83)	7–1–3
12	L	October 31, 1982	1–3	@ Buffalo Sabres (1982–83)	7–2–3

November

Game	Result	Date	Score	Opponent	Record
13	W	November 2, 1982	5–4	New Jersey Devils (1982–83)	8–2–3
14	W	November 4, 1982	8–3	Minnesota North Stars (1982–83)	9–2–3
15	W	November 6, 1982	4–2	Vancouver Canucks (1982–83)	10–2–3
16	W	November 9, 1982	3–2	@ Minnesota North Stars (1982–83)	11–2–3
17	L	November 10, 1982	3–6	@ Chicago Black Hawks (1982–83)	11–3–3
18	L	November 13, 1982	1–2	@ Los Angeles Kings (1982–83)	11–4–3
19	W	November 16, 1982	7–1	@ Hartford Whalers (1982–83)	12–4–3
20	W	November 18, 1982	7–4	Quebec Nordiques (1982–83)	13–4–3
21	W	November 20, 1982	6–4	Philadelphia Flyers (1982–83)	14–4–3
22	T	November 23, 1982	1–1	@ St. Louis Blues (1982–83)	14–4–4
23	W	November 24, 1982	4–2	@ Detroit Red Wings (1982–83)	15–4–4
24	T	November 27, 1982	5–5	Detroit Red Wings (1982–83)	15–4–5
25	W	November 29, 1982	9–4	Winnipeg Jets (1982–83)	16–4–5

December

Game	Result	Date	Score	Opponent	Record
26	T	December 1, 1982	2–2	@ Buffalo Sabres (1982–83)	16–4–6
27	L	December 4, 1982	4–6	Boston Bruins (1982–83)	16–5–6
28	W	December 6, 1982	11–2	Hartford Whalers (1982–83)	17–5–6
29	L	December 8, 1982	4–7	@ Hartford Whalers (1982–83)	17–6–6
30	L	December 9, 1982	5–8	@ Boston Bruins (1982–83)	17–7–6
31	W	December 11, 1982	3–2	Buffalo Sabres (1982–83)	18–7–6
32	W	December 15, 1982	3–2	@ Vancouver Canucks (1982–83)	19–7–6
33	W	December 18, 1982	5–4	@ Calgary Flames (1982–83)	20–7–6
34	L	December 19, 1982	2–5	@ Edmonton Oilers (1982–83)	20–8–6
35	L	December 23, 1982	3–6	@ Quebec Nordiques (1982–83)	20–9–6
36	T	December 26, 1982	4–4	Quebec Nordiques (1982–83)	20–9–7
37	T	December 28, 1982	4–4	Toronto Maple Leafs (1982–83)	20–9–8
38	L	December 29, 1982	5–6	@ Toronto Maple Leafs (1982–83)	20–10–8

January

Game	Result	Date	Score	Opponent	Record
39	W	January 2, 1983	5–1	Pittsburgh Penguins (1982–83)	21–10–8
40	L	January 4, 1983	1–3	@ Quebec Nordiques (1982–83)	21–11–8
41	W	January 6, 1983	11–3	Los Angeles Kings (1982–83)	22–11–8
42	L	January 8, 1983	1–2	Boston Bruins (1982–83)	22–12–8
43	W	January 11, 1983	8–4	Hartford Whalers (1982–83)	23–12–8
44	L	January 13, 1983	2–4	@ Hartford Whalers (1982–83)	23–13–8
45	W	January 15, 1983	8–7	@ Pittsburgh Penguins (1982–83)	24–13–8
46	W	January 18, 1983	7–2	Calgary Flames (1982–83)	25–13–8
47	T	January 20, 1983	4–4	New York Islanders (1982–83)	25–13–9
48	W	January 22, 1983	4–1	Buffalo Sabres (1982–83)	26–13–9
49	L	January 26, 1983	3–7	@ Buffalo Sabres (1982–83)	26–14–9
50	W	January 27, 1983	4–1	@ New York Rangers (1982–83)	27–14–9
51	T	January 29, 1983	3–3	Washington Capitals (1982–83)	27–14–10

February

Game	Result	Date	Score	Opponent	Record
52	W	February 1, 1983	7–3	@ Vancouver Canucks (1982–83)	28–14–10
53	L	February 3, 1983	3–7	@ Calgary Flames (1982–83)	28–15–10
54	L	February 4, 1983	3–7	@ Edmonton Oilers (1982–83)	28–16–10
55	W	February 6, 1983	2–0	@ Winnipeg Jets (1982–83)	29–16–10
56	W	February 10, 1983	5–3	Winnipeg Jets (1982–83)	30–16–10
57	L	February 12, 1983	2–3	New York Rangers (1982–83)	30–17–10
58	W	February 14, 1983	4–2	Edmonton Oilers (1982–83)	31–17–10
59	L	February 17, 1983	1–4	@ Hartford Whalers (1982–83)	31–18–10
60	L	February 19, 1983	0–5	@ New York Islanders (1982–83)	31–19–10
61	W	February 22, 1983	6–1	Quebec Nordiques (1982–83)	32–19–10
62	W	February 24, 1983	6–3	@ Quebec Nordiques (1982–83)	33–19–10
63	W	February 26, 1983	4–1	Washington Capitals (1982–83)	34–19–10
64	T	February 27, 1983	4–4	@ Detroit Red Wings (1982–83)	34–19–11

March

Game	Result	Date	Score	Opponent	Record
65	T	March 1, 1983	3–3	New York Islanders (1982–83)	34–19–12
66	W	March 5, 1983	6–5	@ St. Louis Blues (1982–83)	35–19–12
67	L	March 6, 1983	4–5	@ Chicago Black Hawks (1982–83)	35–20–12
68	T	March 8, 1983	3–3	Toronto Maple Leafs (1982–83)	35–20–13
69	W	March 10, 1983	3–1	@ Boston Bruins (1982–83)	36–20–13
70	L	March 12, 1983	3–7	New Jersey Devils (1982–83)	36–21–13
71	W	March 15, 1983	5–1	Hartford Whalers (1982–83)	37–21–13
72	L	March 17, 1983	4–6	@ Philadelphia Flyers (1982–83)	37–22–13
73	L	March 19, 1983	4–6	Buffalo Sabres (1982–83)	37–23–13
74	W	March 20, 1983	7–4	@ Buffalo Sabres (1982–83)	38–23–13
75	W	March 22, 1983	6–5	Los Angeles Kings (1982–83)	39–23–13
76	W	March 24, 1983	5–3	Minnesota North Stars (1982–83)	40–23–13
77	W	March 26, 1983	6–5	St. Louis Blues (1982–83)	41–23–13
78	L	March 30, 1983	2–3	@ Pittsburgh Penguins (1982–83)	41–24–13

April

Game	Result	Date	Score	Opponent	Record
79	W	April 2, 1983	2–1	Boston Bruins (1982–83)	42–24–13
80	T	April 3, 1983	4–4	@ Boston Bruins (1982–83)	42–24–14

Legend: Win (2 points) Loss (0 points) Tie (1 point)

== Player statistics ==
=== Regular season ===
==== Scoring ====
Player	Pos	GP	G	A	Pts	PIM	+/-	PPG	SHG	GWG
Guy Lafleur	RW	68	27	49	76	12	6	9	0	1
Ryan Walter	C/LW	80	29	46	75	40	15	8	1	4
Mats Naslund	LW	74	26	45	71	10	34	1	0	6
Mark Napier	RW	73	40	27	67	6	20	3	0	6
Mario Tremblay	RW	80	30	37	67	87	29	7	0	4
Pierre Mondou	C	76	29	37	66	31	32	8	1	3
Larry Robinson	D	71	14	49	63	33	33	6	0	1
Steve Shutt	LW	78	35	22	57	26	8	8	0	0
Doug Wickenheiser	C	78	25	30	55	49	22	5	0	3
Keith Acton	C	78	24	26	50	63	-6	1	0	3
Guy Carbonneau	C	77	18	29	47	68	18	0	5	2
Robert Picard	D	64	7	31	38	60	31	1	0	1
Gilbert Delorme	D	78	12	21	33	89	27	3	0	2
Bob Gainey	LW	80	12	18	30	43	7	0	1	3
Rick Green	D	66	2	24	26	58	23	1	0	0
Craig Ludwig	D	80	0	25	25	59	4	0	0	0
Mark Hunter	RW	31	8	8	16	73	5	1	0	2
Chris Nilan	RW	66	6	8	14	213	-10	0	0	0
Gaston Gingras	D	22	1	8	9	8	10	1	0	1
Rejean Houle	W	16	2	3	5	8	4	1	0	0
Bill Root	D	46	2	3	5	24	5	0	0	0
Ric Nattress	D	40	1	3	4	19	8	0	0	0
Dan Daoust	C	4	0	1	1	4	-2	0	0	0
Richard Sevigny	G	38	0	1	1	8	0	0	0	0
Rick Wamsley	G	46	0	1	1	4	0	0	0	0
Mark Holden	G	2	0	0	0	0	0	0	0	0
Yvan Joly	RW	1	0	0	0	0	-1	0	0	0
Bill Kitchen	D	8	0	0	0	4	-2	0	0	0
Dwight Schofield	D	2	0	0	0	7	1	0	0	0

==== Goaltending ====
Player	MIN	GP	W	L	T	GA	GAA	SO
Rick Wamsley	2583	46	27	12	5	151	3.51	0
Richard Sevigny	2130	38	15	11	8	122	3.44	1
Mark Holden	87	2	0	1	1	6	4.14	0
Team:	4800	80	42	24	14	279	3.49	1

=== Playoffs ===
==== Scoring ====
Player	Pos	GP	G	A	Pts	PIM	PPG	SHG	GWG
Guy Lafleur	RW	3	0	2	2	2	0	0	0
Mats Naslund	LW	3	1	0	1	0	1	0	0
Steve Shutt	LW	3	1	0	1	0	0	0	0
Pierre Mondou	C	3	0	1	1	2	0	0	0
Mario Tremblay	RW	3	0	1	1	7	0	0	0
Keith Acton	C	3	0	0	0	0	0	0	0
Guy Carbonneau	C	3	0	0	0	2	0	0	0
Gilbert Delorme	D	3	0	0	0	2	0	0	0
Bob Gainey	LW	3	0	0	0	4	0	0	0
Rick Green	D	3	0	0	0	2	0	0	0
Rejean Houle	W	1	0	0	0	0	0	0	0
Craig Ludwig	D	3	0	0	0	2	0	0	0
Mark Napier	RW	3	0	0	0	0	0	0	0
Ric Nattress	D	3	0	0	0	10	0	0	0
John Newberry	C	2	0	0	0	0	0	0	0
Chris Nilan	RW	3	0	0	0	5	0	0	0
Robert Picard	D	3	0	0	0	0	0	0	0
Larry Robinson	D	3	0	0	0	2	0	0	0
Richard Sevigny	G	1	0	0	0	0	0	0	0
Ryan Walter	C/LW	3	0	0	0	11	0	0	0
Rick Wamsley	G	3	0	0	0	0	0	0	0

==== Goaltending ====
Player	MIN	GP	W	L	GA	GAA	SO
Richard Sevigny	28	1	0	0	0	0.00	0
Rick Wamsley	152	3	0	3	7	2.76	0
Team:	180	3	0	3	7	2.33	0

Note:

Pos = Position;GP = Games played; G = Goals; A = Assists; Pts = Points; PIM = Penalty minutes; +/- = Plus/minus; PPG = Power-play goals; SHG = Short-handed goals; GWG = Game-winning goals
Pos = Position;GP = Games played; Min, TOI = Minutes played; W = Wins; L = Losses; T,T/OT = Ties; OTL = Overtime losses; GA = Goals-against; GAA = Goals-against average; SO = Shutouts; SA = Shots against; SV = Shots saved;SV% = Save percentage;

== Draft picks ==
Round	#	Player	Nationality	College/junior/club team
1	19	Alain Heroux	Canada	Chicoutimi Saguenéens (QMJHL)
2	31	Jocelyn Gauvreau	Canada	Granby Bisons (QMJHL)
2	32	Kent Carlson	United States	St. Lawrence University (ECAC)
2	33	David Maley	United States	Edina High School (USHS-MN)
2	40	Scott Sandelin	United States	Hibbing High School (USHS-MN)
3	61	Scott Harlow	United States	East Bridgewater High School (USHS-MA)
4	69	John DeVoe	United States	Edina High School (USHS-MN)
5	103	Kevin Houle	United States	Acton-Boxborough High School (USHS-MA)
6	117	Ernie Vargas	United States	Coon Rapids High School (USHS-MN)
6	124	Mike Dark	Canada	Sarnia Legionnaires (WOJHL)
7	145	Hannu Jarvenpaa	Finland	Oulu (Finland)
8	150	Steve Smith	United States	St. Lawrence University (ECAC)
8	166	Tom Kolioupoulos	United States	Fraser High School (USHS-MI)
9	187	Brian Williams	United States	Sioux City Musketeers (USHL)
10	208	Bob Emery	United States	Matignon High School (USHS-MA)
11	229	Darren Acheson	Canada	Fort Saskatchewan Traders (AJHL)
12	250	Bill Brauer	United States	Edina High School (USHS-MN)

== See also ==
- 1982–83 NHL season
