= Ron Friest =

Canadian ice hockey player

- Born: November 4, 1958 (age 66); Windsor, Ontario, Canada
- Height: 5 ft 11 in (180 cm)
- Weight: 180 lb (82 kg; 12 st 12 lb)
- Position: Left wing
- Shot: Left
- Played for: Minnesota North Stars
- NHL draft: Undrafted
- Playing career: 1978–1983

Ronald Friest (born November 4, 1958) is a Canadian former professional ice hockey player who played 64 games in the National Hockey League (NHL) with the Minnesota North Stars between 1981 and 1983.

== Career statistics ==
=== Regular season and playoffs ===
			Regular season					Playoffs
Season	Team	League	GP	G	A	Pts	PIM	GP	G	A	Pts	PIM
1976–77	Niagara Falls Flyers	OMJHL	5	1	0	1	2	—	—	—	—	—
1976–77	Windsor Spitfires	OMJHL	57	19	18	37	52	9	4	3	7	11
1977–78	Windsor Spitfires	OMJHL	67	11	20	31	197	6	1	1	2	9
1978–79	Oklahoma City Stars	CHL	2	0	4	4	0	—	—	—	—	—
1978–79	Flint Generals	IHL	54	21	18	39	141	11	4	3	7	19
1979–80	Oklahoma City Stars	CHL	11	3	3	6	39	—	—	—	—	—
1979–80	Baltimore Clippers	EHL	48	35	40	75	162	10	8	1	9	49
1980–81	Minnesota North Stars	NHL	4	1	0	1	10	—	—	—	—	—
1980–81	Oklahoma City Stars	CHL	71	25	20	45	170	3	2	1	3	7
1981–82	Minnesota North Stars	NHL	10	0	0	0	31	2	0	0	0	5
1981–82	Nashville South Stars	CHL	68	32	31	63	199	—	—	—	—	—
1982–83	Minnesota North Stars	NHL	50	6	7	13	150	4	1	0	1	2
CHL totals			152	60	58	118	408	3	2	1	3	7
NHL totals			64	7	7	14	191	6	1	0	1	7
