= Chris Valentine =

Canadian ice hockey player and coach

- Born: December 6, 1961 (age 64) Belleville, Ontario, Canada
- Height: 6 ft 1 in (185 cm)
- Weight: 190 lb (86 kg; 13 st 8 lb)
- Position: Centre
- Played for: Washington Capitals; Düsseldorfer EG
- NHL draft: 194th overall, 1981; Washington Capitals
- Playing career: 1981–1996

Christopher William Valentine (born December 6, 1961) is a Canadian former professional ice hockey player and coach. He played 105 games in the National Hockey League with the Washington Capitals from 1981 to 1983. The rest of his career, which lasted from 1981 to 1996, was mainly spent with Düsseldorfer EG in the Eishockey-Bundesliga and Deutsche Eishockey Liga.

== Biography ==
Valentine was born in Belleville, Ontario and raised in Kanata, Ontario. As a youth, he played in the 1973 and 1974 Quebec International Pee-Wee Hockey Tournaments with a minor ice hockey team from North Shore.

Valentine began his hockey career in 1978 at St. Louis University before moving to the QMJHL's Sorel Black Hawks. He was selected in the 1981 NHL entry draft in the tenth round by the Washington Capitals. Starting with the 1981–82 NHL season he played for the Capitals and their farm team, the Hershey Bears in the American Hockey League. He played 105 NHL games, all with the Capitals, during his career.

As a free agent following the 1983–84 NHL season, Valentine elected to sign in Germany with DEG in Düsseldorf. From 1990 to 1993 and again in 1996, Valentine led DEG to the German national championship. By the end of his career in 1996 he had played 571 games for DEG.

After the end of his playing career Valentine became a coach, accepting the head coaching position with DEG in 1997. In 1998 he moved to the EV Landshut, later to Adler Mannheim and in 2001 to the Krefeld Pinguine. In 2003, Valentine ended his coaching career in Germany and returned to his native Canada with his family. In December 2006 he took over as head coach of the EHC Black Wings Linz of the Austrian Hockey League and returned to Canada at the end of the 2006–07 season for personal reasons.

Valentine is the father of Canadian figure skater and television personality Mandy Valentine.

== Career statistics ==
=== Regular season and playoffs ===
			Regular season					Playoffs
Season	Team	League	GP	G	A	Pts	PIM	GP	G	A	Pts	PIM
1977–78	Lac St-Louis Lions	QMAAA	39	41	61	102	105	7	6	15	21	26
1978–79	Saint Louis University	CCHA	34	27	44	71	52	—	—	—	—	—
1979–80	Verdun/Sorel Éperviers	QMJHL	72	48	80	128	76	—	—	—	—	—
1980–81	Sorel Éperviers	QMJHL	72	65	77	142	176	5	5	5	10	8
1981–82	Washington Capitals	NHL	60	30	37	67	92	—	—	—	—	—
1981–82	Hershey Bears	AHL	19	12	9	21	69	—	—	—	—	—
1982–83	Washington Capitals	NHL	23	7	10	17	14	2	0	0	0	4
1982–83	Hershey Bears	AHL	51	31	38	69	66	—	—	—	—	—
1983–84	Washington Capitals	NHL	22	6	5	11	21	—	—	—	—	—
1983–84	Hershey Bears	AHL	47	15	44	59	41	—	—	—	—	—
1984–85	Düsseldorfer EG	GER	36	37	42	79	74	4	1	3	4	24
1985–86	Düsseldorfer EG	GER	45	36	67	103	98	9	9	15	24	19
1986–87	Düsseldorfer EG	GER	42	28	50	78	71	8	4	11	15	—
1987–88	Düsseldorfer EG	GER	43	34	50	84	63	10	4	14	18	23
1988–89	Düsseldorfer EG	GER	36	27	47	74	34	11	4	10	14	27
1989–90	Düsseldorfer EG	GER	36	27	39	66	35	11	5	10	15	22
1990–91	Düsseldorfer EG	GER	42	22	52	74	76	12	8	13	21	8
1991–92	Düsseldorfer EG	GER	44	32	49	81	56	9	10	8	18	16
1992–93	Düsseldorfer EG	GER	44	26	44	70	56	11	7	10	17	6
1993–94	Düsseldorfer EG	GER	43	19	40	59	52	12	2	5	7	14
1994–95	Düsseldorfer EG	DEL	41	15	32	47	102	10	10	7	17	16
1995–96	Düsseldorfer EG	DEL	26	9	8	17	22	12	5	10	15	30
GER totals			411	288	480	768	615	97	54	99	153	—
NHL totals			105	43	52	95	127	2	0	0	0	4

== Awards and honours ==
DEG has retired Valentine's number 10.

Award	Year
All-CCHA Second Team	1978-79
