= 1982–83 Los Angeles Kings season =

National Hockey League team season

1982–83 Los Angeles Kings
- Division: 5th Smythe
- Conference: 8th Campbell
- 1982–83 record: 27–41–12
- Home record: 20–13–7
- Road record: 7–28–5
- Goals for: 308
- Goals against: 365

Team information
- General manager: George Maguire
- Coach: Don Perry
- Captain: Dave Lewis
- Alternate captains: None
- Arena: The Forum
- Average attendance: 11,546

Team leaders
- Goals: Marcel Dionne (56)
- Assists: Marcel Dionne; Charlie Simmer (51)
- Points: Marcel Dionne (107)
- Penalty minutes: Jay Wells (167)
- Plus/minus: Jay Wells (+11)
- Wins: Gary Laskoski (15)
- Goals against average: Gary Laskoski (4.56)

The 1982–83 Los Angeles Kings season, was the Kings' 16th season in the National Hockey League (NHL). It saw the Kings miss the playoffs, finishing last in the Smythe Division.

== Offseason ==
Goaltender Gary Laskoski attended the camp on a tryout basis. He had played four years at St. Lawrence University, but had never been drafted. Based on his performance at camp, Laskoski was named the number one goalie for the team. Laskoski was not signed to a contract until after several regular season games, earning $200 per game.

== Regular season ==
One highlight came on January 18, when Laskoski and the Kings ended Wayne Gretzky's consecutive goal streak at 30. However, it was one of the few highlights as the Kings finished last in the division. The Kings finished with the fewest goals scored in the Division and the highest goals against in the division. Laskoski played in 46 games as the number one goalie, but the team played four other goalies in the backup role.

=== Final standings ===
Smythe Division
	GP	W	L	T	GF	GA	Pts
**Edmonton Oilers**	80	47	21	12	424	315	106
**Calgary Flames**	80	32	34	14	321	316	78
**Vancouver Canucks**	80	30	35	15	303	309	75
**Winnipeg Jets**	80	33	39	8	311	333	74
Los Angeles Kings	80	27	41	12	308	365	66

Note: GP = Games played, W = Wins, L = Losses, T = Ties, Pts = Points, GF = Goals for, GA = Goals against
Note: Teams that qualified for the playoffs are highlighted in bold.

=== Record vs. opponents ===
Smythe Division record vs. opponents

==== Vs. Campbell Conference ====
**Vs. Smythe Division**

1982–83 NHL records
Team	**CGY**	**EDM**	**LAK**	**VAN**	**WIN**	**Total**
Calgary	—	2−4−2	3−3−2	5−2−1	5−2−1	**15−11−6**
Edmonton	4−2−2	—	5−1−2	5−2−1	6−2	**20−7−5**
Los Angeles	3−3−2	1−5−2	—	3−3−2	2−6	**9−17−6**
Vancouver	2−5−1	2−5−1	3−3−2	—	4−3−1	**11−16−5**
Winnipeg	2−5−1	2−6	6−2	3−4−1	—	**13−17−2**

**Vs. Norris Division**

1982–83 NHL records
Team	**CHI**	**DET**	**MIN**	**STL**	**TOR**	**Total**
Calgary	2−1	2−1	1−1−1	2−1	1−1−1	**8−5−2**
Edmonton	1−1−1	2−1	2−1	2−0−1	2−0−1	**9−3−3**
Los Angeles	0−2−1	1−0−2	1−2	1−2	2−1	**5−7−3**
Vancouver	1−0−2	1−1−1	0−2−1	3−0	1−2	**6−5−4**
Winnipeg	1−2	3−0	0−3	2−1	3−0	**9−6−0**

**Vs. Wales Conference**

**Vs. Adams Division**

1982–83 NHL records
Team	**BOS**	**BUF**	**HFD**	**MTL**	**QUE**	**Total**
Calgary	0−2−1	1−2	1−0−2	1−2	0−2−1	**3−8−4**
Edmonton	0−2−1	2−1	2−0−1	2−1	1−1−1	**7−5−3**
Los Angeles	2−1	1−2	2−1	1−2	1−1−1	**7−7−1**
Vancouver	1−2	1−1−1	2−1	0−3	3−0	**7−7−1**
Winnipeg	2−0−1	1−2	1−1−1	0−3	1−2	**5−8−2**

**Vs. Patrick Division**

1982–83 NHL records
Team	**NJD**	**NYI**	**NYR**	**PHI**	**PIT**	**WSH**	**Total**
Calgary	2−1	0−2−1	0−2−1	0−3	3−0	1−2	**6−10−2**
Edmonton	3−0	0−3	3−0	1−2	2−1	2−0−1	**11−6−1**
Los Angeles	2−1	0−3	1−1−1	1−2	1−2	1−1−1	**6−10−2**
Vancouver	0−1−2	1−2	1−1–1	1−1−1	2−1	1−1−1	**6−7−5**
Winnipeg	2−1	1−1−1	1−1−1	0−3	2−1	0−1−2	**6−8−4**

== Schedule and results ==
1982–83 regular season
October

Game	Result	Date	Score	Opponent	Record
1	T	October 6, 1982	3–3	Vancouver Canucks (1982–83)	0–0–1
2	W	October 9, 1982	3–1	Calgary Flames (1982–83)	1–0–1
3	W	October 12, 1982	5–3	@ Winnipeg Jets (1982–83)	2–0–1
4	T	October 14, 1982	4–4	@ Quebec Nordiques (1982–83)	2–0–2
5	L	October 16, 1982	1–4	@ New York Islanders (1982–83)	2–1–2
6	W	October 17, 1982	5–3	@ New York Rangers (1982–83)	3–1–2
7	W	October 20, 1982	7–4	New Jersey Devils (1982–83)	4–1–2
8	L	October 23, 1982	3–5	Hartford Whalers (1982–83)	4–2–2
9	W	October 24, 1982	5–4	Boston Bruins (1982–83)	5–2–2
10	L	October 27, 1982	3–7	@ Winnipeg Jets (1982–83)	5–3–2
11	L	October 29, 1982	3–6	@ Edmonton Oilers (1982–83)	5–4–2
12	T	October 30, 1982	5–5	Chicago Black Hawks (1982–83)	5–4–3

November

Game	Result	Date	Score	Opponent	Record
13	W	November 3, 1982	6–2	Toronto Maple Leafs (1982–83)	6–4–3
14	W	November 6, 1982	6–2	Pittsburgh Penguins (1982–83)	7–4–3
15	L	November 9, 1982	4–5	@ Calgary Flames (1982–83)	7–5–3
16	L	November 10, 1982	2–4	@ Vancouver Canucks (1982–83)	7–6–3
17	W	November 13, 1982	2–1	Montreal Canadiens (1982–83)	8–6–3
18	L	November 16, 1982	3–8	Minnesota North Stars (1982–83)	8–7–3
19	W	November 18, 1982	4–1	Detroit Red Wings (1982–83)	9–7–3
20	L	November 20, 1982	2–5	Buffalo Sabres (1982–83)	9–8–3
21	W	November 24, 1982	3–0	New Jersey Devils (1982–83)	10–8–3
22	L	November 27, 1982	0–4	Philadelphia Flyers (1982–83)	10–9–3
23	W	November 30, 1982	5–2	@ Vancouver Canucks (1982–83)	11–9–3

December

Game	Result	Date	Score	Opponent	Record
24	W	December 1, 1982	4–1	Calgary Flames (1982–83)	12–9–3
25	W	December 4, 1982	6–3	St. Louis Blues (1982–83)	13–9–3
26	L	December 5, 1982	3–7	@ Edmonton Oilers (1982–83)	13–10–3
27	T	December 7, 1982	4–4	@ Calgary Flames (1982–83)	13–10–4
28	T	December 9, 1982	3–3	Edmonton Oilers (1982–83)	13–10–5
29	L	December 11, 1982	3–4	@ Winnipeg Jets (1982–83)	13–11–5
30	L	December 14, 1982	2–7	@ Washington Capitals (1982–83)	13–12–5
31	L	December 15, 1982	1–7	@ New York Rangers (1982–83)	13–13–5
32	L	December 18, 1982	0–4	@ Boston Bruins (1982–83)	13–14–5
33	L	December 19, 1982	4–6	@ Chicago Black Hawks (1982–83)	13–15–5
34	L	December 21, 1982	2–4	Winnipeg Jets (1982–83)	13–16–5
35	L	December 23, 1982	2–6	Edmonton Oilers (1982–83)	13–17–5
36	W	December 26, 1982	4–2	Vancouver Canucks (1982–83)	14–17–5
37	L	December 29, 1982	3–4	Winnipeg Jets (1982–83)	14–18–5

January

Game	Result	Date	Score	Opponent	Record
38	L	January 6, 1983	3–11	@ Montreal Canadiens (1982–83)	14–19–5
39	L	January 8, 1983	5–7	@ Toronto Maple Leafs (1982–83)	14–20–5
40	L	January 9, 1983	2–7	@ Buffalo Sabres (1982–83)	14–21–5
41	W	January 11, 1983	9–7	@ Washington Capitals (1982–83)	15–21–5
42	T	January 13, 1983	4–4	@ Detroit Red Wings (1982–83)	15–21–6
43	L	January 15, 1983	2–5	@ New York Islanders (1982–83)	15–22–6
44	L	January 16, 1983	3–5	@ New Jersey Devils (1982–83)	15–23–6
45	T	January 18, 1983	3–3	Edmonton Oilers (1982–83)	15–23–7
46	W	January 20, 1983	4–3	Hartford Whalers (1982–83)	16–23–7
47	L	January 23, 1983	6–8	@ Edmonton Oilers (1982–83)	16–24–7
48	L	January 25, 1983	6–8	Calgary Flames (1982–83)	16–25–7
49	L	January 27, 1983	4–6	New York Islanders (1982–83)	16–26–7
50	L	January 29, 1983	2–4	@ St. Louis Blues (1982–83)	16–27–7

February

Game	Result	Date	Score	Opponent	Record
51	T	February 1, 1983	5–5	New York Rangers (1982–83)	16–27–8
52	W	February 3, 1983	7–4	@ Edmonton Oilers (1982–83)	17–27–8
53	L	February 5, 1983	0–2	Philadelphia Flyers (1982–83)	17–28–8
54	W	February 10, 1983	7–2	Buffalo Sabres (1982–83)	18–28–8
55	L	February 12, 1983	4–6	@ Pittsburgh Penguins (1982–83)	18–29–8
56	W	February 13, 1983	5–4	@ Philadelphia Flyers (1982–83)	19–29–8
57	W	February 15, 1983	5–2	@ Hartford Whalers (1982–83)	20–29–8
58	T	February 17, 1983	5–5	@ Detroit Red Wings (1982–83)	20–29–9
59	T	February 19, 1983	3–3	Washington Capitals (1982–83)	20–29–10
60	L	February 20, 1983	2–5	@ Vancouver Canucks (1982–83)	20–30–10
61	W	February 22, 1983	5–3	Boston Bruins (1982–83)	21–30–10
62	W	February 24, 1983	8–0	Vancouver Canucks (1982–83)	22–30–10
63	W	February 26, 1983	6–2	Toronto Maple Leafs (1982–83)	23–30–10

March

Game	Result	Date	Score	Opponent	Record
64	L	March 1, 1983	2–7	@ St. Louis Blues (1982–83)	23–31–10
65	L	March 2, 1983	3–5	@ Chicago Black Hawks (1982–83)	23–32–10
66	T	March 5, 1983	4–4	@ Calgary Flames (1982–83)	23–32–11
67	L	March 6, 1983	3–8	@ Minnesota North Stars (1982–83)	23–33–11
68	W	March 8, 1983	6–4	Calgary Flames (1982–83)	24–33–11
69	L	March 13, 1983	5–6	Winnipeg Jets (1982–83)	24–34–11
70	W	March 15, 1983	4–3	Winnipeg Jets (1982–83)	25–34–11
71	W	March 17, 1983	4–3	Quebec Nordiques (1982–83)	26–34–11
72	L	March 19, 1983	4–7	Pittsburgh Penguins (1982–83)	26–35–11
73	L	March 22, 1983	5–6	@ Montreal Canadiens (1982–83)	26–36–11
74	L	March 24, 1983	3–7	@ Quebec Nordiques (1982–83)	26–37–11
75	L	March 26, 1983	3–9	Edmonton Oilers (1982–83)	26–38–11
76	L	March 27, 1983	4–8	@ Vancouver Canucks (1982–83)	26–39–11
77	L	March 29, 1983	3–5	@ Calgary Flames (1982–83)	26–40–11
78	L	March 30, 1983	5–10	@ Winnipeg Jets (1982–83)	26–41–11

April

Game	Result	Date	Score	Opponent	Record
79	W	April 2, 1983	8–5	Minnesota North Stars (1982–83)	27–41–11
80	T	April 3, 1983	2–2	Vancouver Canucks (1982–83)	27–41–12

Legend: Win (2 points) Loss (0 points) Tie (1 point)

== Player statistics ==
Regular season
Scoring

Player	Pos	GP	G	A	Pts	PIM	+/-	PPG	SHG	GWG
Marcel Dionne	C	80	56	51	107	22	10	17	1	7
Charlie Simmer	LW	80	29	51	80	51	0	11	1	1
Jim Fox	RW	77	28	40	68	8	-11	7	0	1
Larry Murphy	D	77	14	48	62	81	2	9	0	2
Dave Taylor	RW	46	21	37	58	76	4	6	0	1
Bernie Nicholls	C	71	28	22	50	124	-23	12	0	3
Terry Ruskowski	C	71	14	30	44	127	-16	4	1	2
Daryl Evans	LW	80	18	22	40	21	-18	1	1	0
Mark Hardy	D	74	5	34	39	101	-30	3	0	1
John Paul Kelly	LW	65	16	15	31	52	-14	4	1	2
Jerry Korab	D	72	3	26	29	90	-6	1	0	0
Mike Murphy	RW	74	16	11	27	52	-11	0	5	2
Steve Bozek	LW	53	13	13	26	14	-18	3	0	1
Warren Holmes	C	39	8	16	24	7	-8	2	0	0
Doug Smith	C	42	11	11	22	12	-14	1	0	1
Ulf Isaksson	LW	50	7	15	22	10	1	0	0	1
Dean Hopkins	RW	49	5	12	17	43	-5	0	0	0
Jay Wells	D	69	3	12	15	167	11	0	0	1
Dave Lewis	D	79	2	10	12	53	-22	0	0	0
Dean Kennedy	D	55	0	12	12	97	-17	0	0	0
Rick Chartraw	D/RW	31	3	5	8	31	-14	0	0	0
Dave Morrison	RW	24	3	3	6	4	-7	0	0	1
Howard Scruton	D	4	0	4	4	9	-4	0	0	0
Brian MacLellan	LW	8	0	3	3	7	-5	0	0	0
Phil Sykes	LW	7	2	0	2	2	1	0	0	0
Dan Bonar	C	20	1	1	2	40	-7	0	0	0
Scott Gruhl	LW	7	0	2	2	4	-5	0	0	0
Markus Mattsson	G	19	0	2	2	2	0	0	0	0
Pierre Giroux	C	6	1	0	1	17	-1	0	0	0
Victor Nechayev	C	3	1	0	1	0	1	0	0	0
Jim Brown	D	3	0	1	1	5	-2	0	0	0
Peter Helander	D	7	0	1	1	0	-2	0	0	0
Doug Keans	G	6	0	1	1	0	0	0	0	0
Gary Laskoski	G	46	0	1	1	6	0	0	0	0
Mario Lessard	G	19	0	1	1	2	0	0	0	0
Blair Barnes	RW	1	0	0	0	0	0	0	0	0
Mike Blake	G	9	0	0	0	2	0	0	0	0
Rick Blight	RW	2	0	0	0	2	-3	0	0	0
Dave Gans	C	3	0	0	0	0	-1	0	0	0
Bob Gladney	D	1	0	0	0	2	-2	0	0	0
Al Sims	D	1	0	0	0	0	0	0	0	0
Dean Turner	D	3	0	0	0	4	0	0	0	0

Goaltending

Player	MIN	GP	W	L	T	GA	GAA	SO
Gary Laskoski	2277	46	15	20	4	173	4.56	0
Markus Mattsson	899	19	5	5	4	65	4.34	1
Mike Blake	432	9	4	4	0	30	4.17	0
Mario Lessard	888	19	3	10	2	68	4.59	1
Doug Keans	304	6	0	2	2	24	4.74	0
Team:	4800	80	27	41	12	360	4.50	2

Note:

Pos = Position;GP = Games played; G = Goals; A = Assists; Pts = Points; PIM = Penalty minutes; +/- = Plus/minus; PPG = Power-play goals; SHG = Short-handed goals; GWG = Game-winning goals
Pos = Position;GP = Games played; Min, TOI = Minutes played; W = Wins; L = Losses; T,T/OT = Ties; OTL = Overtime losses; GA = Goals-against; GAA = Goals-against average; SO = Shutouts; SA = Shots against; SV = Shots saved;SV% = Save percentage;

== Awards and records ==
- Marcel Dionne – Kings' representative at the NHL All-Star Game.

== Transactions ==
The Kings were involved in the following transactions during the 1982–83 season.

=== Trades ===
June 22, 1982	To Los Angeles Kings Blair Barnes	To Edmonton Oilers Paul Mulvey
September 9, 1982	To Los Angeles Kings Dean Turner	To Buffalo Sabres Cash
October 19, 1982	To Los Angeles Kings 4th round pick in 1983 – Dave Korol	To Toronto Maple Leafs Greg Terrion
October 24, 1982	To Los Angeles Kings Terry Ruskowski	To Chicago Black Hawks Larry Goodenough; 3rd round pick in 1984 – Trent Yawney
December 7, 1982	To Los Angeles Kings Rick Blight	To Edmonton Oilers Alan Hangsleben
February 1, 1983	To Los Angeles Kings Markus Mattsson	To Minnesota North Stars 3rd round pick in 1985 – Stéphane Roy

=== Free agent signings ===
May 12, 1982	From Bowling Green State University (WCHA) Brian MacLellan
August 5, 1982	From New Haven Nighthawks (AHL) Pierre Giroux
October 22, 1982	From St. Lawrence University (ECAC) Gary Laskoski

=== Free agents lost ===
September 13, 1982	To Detroit Red Wings Jim Rutherford
October 4, 1982	To Pittsburgh Penguins Ian Turnbull

=== Waivers ===
January 13, 1983	To New York Rangers Rick Chartraw

== Draft picks ==
Los Angeles's draft picks at the 1982 NHL entry draft held at the Montreal Forum in Montreal.

Round	#	Player	Nationality	College/Junior/Club team (League)
2	27	Mike Heidt	Canada	Calgary Wranglers (WHL)
3	48	Steve Seguin	Canada	Kingston Canadians (OHL)
4	64	Dave Gans	Canada	Oshawa Generals (OHL)
4	82	Dave Ross	Canada	Seattle Breakers (WHL)
5	90	Darcy Roy	Canada	Ottawa 67's (OHL)
5	95	Ulf Isaksson	Sweden	Solna (Sweden)
7	132	Victor Nechayev	Soviet Union	SKA Leningrad (USSR)
8	153	Peter Helander	Sweden	Skelleftea AIK (Sweden)
9	174	Dave Chartier	Canada	Saskatoon Blades (WHL)
10	195	John Franzosa	United States	Brown University (ECAC)
11	216	Ray Shero	United States	St. Lawrence University (ECAC)
12	237	Mats Ulander	Sweden	Solna (Sweden)

== See also ==
- 1982–83 NHL season
