= 1982–83 New York Islanders season =

NHL hockey team season (won 4th Stanley Cup)

1982–83 New York Islanders
- Stanley Cup champions
- Wales Conference champions
- Division: 2nd Patrick
- Conference: 4th Wales
- 1982–83 record: 42–26–12
- Home record: 26–11–3
- Road record: 16–15–9
- Goals for: 302
- Goals against: 226

Team information
- General manager: Bill Torrey
- Coach: Al Arbour
- Captain: Denis Potvin
- Alternate captains: None
- Arena: Nassau Coliseum

Team leaders
- Goals: Mike Bossy (60)
- Assists: Mike Bossy (58)
- Points: Mike Bossy (118)
- Penalty minutes: Brent Sutter (128)
- Wins: Rollie Melanson (24)
- Goals against average: Rollie Melanson (2.66)

The 1982–83 New York Islanders season was the 11th season in the franchise's history. It involved winning their fourth consecutive Stanley Cup.

== Offseason ==
=== NHL draft ===
Round	#	Player	Nationality	College/Junior/Club team
1	21	Patrick Flatley	Canada	University of Wisconsin (WCHA)
2	42	Vern Smith	Canada	Lethbridge Broncos (WHL)
3	63	Garry Lacey	Canada	Toronto Marlboros (OHL)
4	84	Alan Kerr	Canada	Seattle Breakers (WHL)
5	105	Rene Breton	Canada	Granby Bisons (QMJHL)
6	126	Roger Kortko	Canada	Saskatoon Blades (WHL)
7	147	John Tiano	United States	Winthrop High School (USHS-MA)
8	168	Todd Okerlund	United States	Burnsville High School (USHS-MN)
9	189	Gord Paddock	Canada	Saskatoon Blades (WHL)
10	210	Eric Faust	Canada	Henry Carr Crusaders (MetJHL)
11	231	Pat Goff	United States	Ramsey High School (USHS-MN)
12	252	Jim Koudys	Canada	Sudbury Wolves (OHL)

== Regular season ==
- The 35th National Hockey League All-Star Game was played at Nassau Veterans Memorial Coliseum on February 8, 1983. The Campbell Conference defeated the Wales Conference 9–3. Denis Potvin, Bryan Trottier, Mike Bossy, and Dave Langevin all participated in the All-Star Game as representatives of the Wales Conference.

=== Season standings ===
Patrick Division
	GP	W	L	T	GF	GA	Pts
**Philadelphia Flyers**	80	49	23	8	326	240	106
**New York Islanders**	80	42	26	12	302	226	96
**Washington Capitals**	80	39	25	16	306	283	94
**New York Rangers**	80	35	35	10	306	287	80
New Jersey Devils	80	17	49	14	230	338	48
Pittsburgh Penguins	80	18	53	9	250	394	45

Note: GP = Games played, W = Wins, L = Losses, T = Ties, Pts = Points, GF = Goals for, GA = Goals against
Note: Teams that qualified for the playoffs are highlighted in bold.

=== Record vs. opponents ===
Patrick Division record vs. opponents

==== Vs. Wales Conference ====
**Vs. Patrick Division**

1982–83 NHL records
Team	**NJD**	**NYI**	**NYR**	**PHI**	**PIT**	**WSH**	**Total**
New Jersey	—	0−7	3−3−1	2−5	3−1−3	0−6−1	8−22−5
N.Y. Islanders	7−0	—	4−3	1−4−2	5−2	4−2−1	21−11−3
N.Y. Rangers	3−3−1	3−4	—	3−4	5−1−1	3−3−1	17−15−3
Philadelphia	5−2	4−1−2	4−3	—	5−1−1	3−4	21−11−3
Pittsburgh	1−3−3	2−5	1−5−1	1–5–1	—	1−5−1	6−23−6
Washington	6−0−1	2−4−1	3−3−1	4–3	5–1–1	—	20−11−4

**Vs. Adams Division**

1982–83 NHL records
Team	**BOS**	**BUF**	**HFD**	**MTL**	**QUE**	**Total**
New Jersey	0−1−2	0−2−1	1−2	1−2	1−2	3−9−3
N.Y. Islanders	0−2−1	1−2	2−1	1−0−2	1−1−1	5−6−4
N.Y. Rangers	0−3	0−2−1	2−1	1−2	1−2	4−10−1
Philadelphia	0−2−1	1−2	2−1	1−2	3−0	7−7−1
Pittsburgh	1−2	1−1−1	3−0	1−2	0−3	6−8−1
Washington	3−0	0−3	2−0−1	0−1−2	1−1−1	6−5−4

==== Vs. Campbell Conference ====
**Vs. Norris Division**

1982–83 NHL records
Team	**CHI**	**DET**	**MIN**	**STL**	**TOR**	**Total**
New Jersey	0−3	1−1−1	0−3	0−2−1	1−0−2	2−9−4
N.Y. Islanders	1−1−1	0−2−1	0−2−1	2−1	2−1	5−7−3
N.Y. Rangers	0−3	2−0−1	2−1	2−0−1	3−0	9−4−2
Philadelphia	1−1−1	3−0	1−1−1	3−0	2−0−1	10−2−3
Pittsburgh	0−3	0−2−1	0−2−1	0−3	1−2	1−12−2
Washington	2−0−1	2−1	1−1−1	1−1−1	2−1	8−4−3

**Vs. Smythe Division**

1982–83 NHL records
Team	**CGY**	**EDM**	**LAK**	**VAN**	**WIN**	**Total**
New Jersey	1−2	0−3	1−2	1−0−2	1−2	4−9−2
N.Y. Islanders	2−0−1	3−0	3−0	2−1	1−1−1	11−2−2
N.Y. Rangers	2−0−1	0−3	1−1−1	1−1−1	1−1−1	5−6−4
Philadelphia	3−0	2−1	2−1	1−1−1	3−0	11−3−1
Pittsburgh	0−3	1−2	2−1	1−2	1−2	5−10−0
Washington	2−1	0−2−1	1−1−1	1−1−1	1−0−2	5−5−5

== Schedule and results ==
=== Regular season ===
1982–83 regular season
October

Game	Result	Date	Score	Opponent	Record
1	L	October 5, 1982	1–2	@ Vancouver Canucks (1982–83)	0–1–0
2	W	October 7, 1982	5–4	@ Calgary Flames (1982–83)	1–1–0
3	W	October 8, 1982	6–4	@ Edmonton Oilers (1982–83)	2–1–0
4	W	October 11, 1982	4–3	@ New York Rangers (1982–83)	3–1–0
5	W	October 14, 1982	9–0	Pittsburgh Penguins (1982–83)	4–1–0
6	W	October 16, 1982	4–1	Los Angeles Kings (1982–83)	5–1–0
7	W	October 19, 1982	5–4	Vancouver Canucks (1982–83)	6–1–0
8	W	October 21, 1982	6–3	Washington Capitals (1982–83)	7–1–0
9	W	October 23, 1982	5–2	New York Rangers (1982–83)	8–1–0
10	L	October 24, 1982	2–4	@ Chicago Black Hawks (1982–83)	8–2–0
11	W	October 26, 1982	7–2	Calgary Flames (1982–83)	9–2–0
12	W	October 28, 1982	4–2	@ New Jersey Devils (1982–83)	10–2–0
13	W	October 30, 1982	8–5	New Jersey Devils (1982–83)	11–2–0

November

Game	Result	Date	Score	Opponent	Record
14	L	November 2, 1982	1–3	Pittsburgh Penguins (1982–83)	11–3–0
15	T	November 3, 1982	3–3	@ Detroit Red Wings (1982–83)	11–3–1
16	L	November 6, 1982	3–6	Philadelphia Flyers (1982–83)	11–4–1
17	T	November 7, 1982	2–2	@ Philadelphia Flyers (1982–83)	11–4–2
18	W	November 9, 1982	4–1	St. Louis Blues (1982–83)	12–4–2
19	L	November 11, 1982	0–2	@ Minnesota North Stars (1982–83)	12–5–2
20	L	November 13, 1982	1–3	@ Washington Capitals (1982–83)	12–6–2
21	W	November 16, 1982	4–2	Edmonton Oilers (1982–83)	13–6–2
22	L	November 18, 1982	1–3	Boston Bruins (1982–83)	13–7–2
23	W	November 20, 1982	5–4	Chicago Black Hawks (1982–83)	14–7–2
24	L	November 21, 1982	3–7	@ New York Rangers (1982–83)	14–8–2
25	T	November 23, 1982	8–8	Minnesota North Stars (1982–83)	14–8–3
26	T	November 25, 1982	1–1	@ Boston Bruins (1982–83)	14–8–4
27	L	November 27, 1982	0–3	New York Rangers (1982–83)	14–9–4
28	T	November 28, 1982	3–3	@ Washington Capitals (1982–83)	14–9–5
29	W	November 30, 1982	3–2	@ St. Louis Blues (1982–83)	15–9–5

December

Game	Result	Date	Score	Opponent	Record
30	L	December 3, 1982	2–4	@ Winnipeg Jets (1982–83)	15–10–5
31	L	December 4, 1982	1–4	@ Toronto Maple Leafs (1982–83)	15–11–5
32	W	December 7, 1982	6–3	Toronto Maple Leafs (1982–83)	16–11–5
33	L	December 8, 1982	0–2	@ Detroit Red Wings (1982–83)	16–12–5
34	W	December 11, 1982	7–1	New Jersey Devils (1982–83)	17–12–5
35	L	December 14, 1982	3–5	Buffalo Sabres (1982–83)	17–13–5
36	W	December 17, 1982	5–2	@ New York Rangers (1982–83)	18–13–5
37	T	December 18, 1982	4–4	Philadelphia Flyers (1982–83)	18–13–6
38	T	December 21, 1982	3–3	@ Quebec Nordiques (1982–83)	18–13–7
39	L	December 23, 1982	1–5	Washington Capitals (1982–83)	18–14–7
40	W	December 26, 1982	3–2	@ Hartford Whalers (1982–83)	19–14–7
41	L	December 31, 1982	1–5	@ Buffalo Sabres (1982–83)	19–15–7

January

Game	Result	Date	Score	Opponent	Record
42	L	January 1, 1983	1–2	@ Pittsburgh Penguins (1982–83)	19–16–7
43	W	January 4, 1983	5–2	Buffalo Sabres (1982–83)	20–16–7
44	W	January 8, 1983	6–1	Quebec Nordiques (1982–83)	21–16–7
45	W	January 11, 1983	4–1	Winnipeg Jets (1982–83)	22–16–7
46	W	January 13, 1983	5–2	@ New Jersey Devils (1982–83)	23–16–7
47	W	January 15, 1983	5–2	Los Angeles Kings (1982–83)	24–16–7
48	W	January 18, 1983	8–1	Hartford Whalers (1982–83)	25–16–7
49	T	January 20, 1983	4–4	@ Montreal Canadiens (1982–83)	25–16–8
50	L	January 22, 1983	0–1	Philadelphia Flyers (1982–83)	25–17–8
51	W	January 27, 1983	6–4	@ Los Angeles Kings (1982–83)	26–17–8
52	W	January 29, 1983	5–3	@ Vancouver Canucks (1982–83)	27–17–8
53	W	January 30, 1983	4–2	@ Edmonton Oilers (1982–83)	28–17–8

February

Game	Result	Date	Score	Opponent	Record
54	T	February 1, 1983	2–2	@ Calgary Flames (1982–83)	28–17–9
55	W	February 3, 1983	7–2	@ New Jersey Devils (1982–83)	29–17–9
56	L	February 5, 1983	2–4	Minnesota North Stars (1982–83)	29–18–9
57	W	February 10, 1983	8–3	Washington Capitals (1982–83)	30–18–9
58	L	February 12, 1983	2–4	Hartford Whalers (1982–83)	30–19–9
59	L	February 15, 1983	1–4	@ Quebec Nordiques (1982–83)	30–20–9
60	W	February 17, 1983	4–1	Pittsburgh Penguins (1982–83)	31–20–9
61	W	February 19, 1983	5–0	Montreal Canadiens (1982–83)	32–20–9
62	T	February 22, 1983	2–2	Winnipeg Jets (1982–83)	32–20–10
63	T	February 23, 1983	4–4	@ Chicago Black Hawks (1982–83)	32–20–11
64	L	February 26, 1983	3–5	Detroit Red Wings (1982–83)	32–21–11
65	L	February 27, 1983	0–2	@ Philadelphia Flyers (1982–83)	32–22–11

March

Game	Result	Date	Score	Opponent	Record
66	T	March 1, 1983	3–3	@ Montreal Canadiens (1982–83)	32–22–12
67	W	March 3, 1983	5–1	Toronto Maple Leafs (1982–83)	33–22–12
68	W	March 5, 1983	5–1	New Jersey Devils (1982–83)	34–22–12
69	L	March 8, 1983	0–6	@ St. Louis Blues (1982–83)	34–23–12
70	W	March 10, 1983	4–3	@ Pittsburgh Penguins (1982–83)	35–23–12
71	W	March 12, 1983	6–2	Washington Capitals (1982–83)	36–23–12
72	L	March 16, 1983	1–2	@ New York Rangers (1982–83)	36–24–12
73	W	March 17, 1983	9–5	@ New Jersey Devils (1982–83)	37–24–12
74	W	March 19, 1983	9–2	Philadelphia Flyers (1982–83)	38–24–12
75	L	March 22, 1983	1–3	Boston Bruins (1982–83)	38–25–12
76	W	March 26, 1983	3–2	New York Rangers (1982–83)	39–25–12
77	W	March 27, 1983	4–1	@ Pittsburgh Penguins (1982–83)	40–25–12
78	W	March 30, 1983	7–1	@ Washington Capitals (1982–83)	41–25–12

April

Game	Result	Date	Score	Opponent	Record
79	W	April 2, 1983	6–3	Pittsburgh Penguins (1982–83)	42–25–12
80	L	April 3, 1983	2–4	@ Philadelphia Flyers (1982–83)	42–26–12

Legend: Win (2 points) Loss (0 points) Tie (1 point)

=== Notable games ===
- November 30 vs. St. Louis: Billy Smith wins his 200th game as an Islander when Denis Potvin scores with 2:59 left.

== Player statistics ==
Regular season
Scoring

Player	Pos	GP	G	A	Pts	PIM	+/-	PPG	SHG	GWG
Mike Bossy	RW	79	60	58	118	20	27	19	0	8
Bryan Trottier	C	80	34	55	89	68	37	13	0	5
John Tonelli	LW	76	31	40	71	55	30	8	1	4
Denis Potvin	D	69	12	54	66	60	32	4	1	1
Bob Bourne	C	77	20	42	62	55	14	5	1	3
Tomas Jonsson	D	72	13	35	48	50	40	1	0	3
Clark Gillies	LW	70	21	20	41	76	9	4	0	2
Brent Sutter	C	80	21	19	40	128	14	1	0	3
Butch Goring	C	75	19	20	39	8	10	2	5	4
Duane Sutter	RW	75	13	19	32	118	8	1	0	2
Bob Nystrom	RW	74	10	20	30	98	6	3	0	3
Stefan Persson	D	70	4	25	29	71	12	2	0	0
Dave Langevin	D	73	4	17	21	64	22	0	0	0
Greg Gilbert	LW	45	8	11	19	30	1	0	0	0
Ken Morrow	D	79	5	11	16	44	18	0	0	1
Wayne Merrick	C	59	4	12	16	27	-3	1	0	2
Mats Hallin	LW	30	7	7	14	26	4	0	0	0
Anders Kallur	RW	55	6	8	14	33	9	1	1	0
Mike McEwen	D	42	2	11	13	16	11	1	0	0
Billy Carroll	C	71	1	11	12	24	3	0	1	0
Paul Boutilier	D	29	4	5	9	24	-5	3	0	1
Gord Lane	D	44	3	4	7	87	1	0	0	0
Roland Melanson	G	44	0	3	3	22	0	0	0	0
Kevin Devine	LW	2	0	1	1	8	1	0	0	0
Gord Dineen	D	2	0	0	0	4	-2	0	0	0
Darcy Regier	D	6	0	0	0	7	0	0	0	0
Billy Smith	G	41	0	0	0	41	0	0	0	0

Goaltending

Player	MIN	GP	W	L	T	GA	GAA	SO
Roland Melanson	2460	44	24	12	5	109	2.66	1
Billy Smith	2340	41	18	14	7	112	2.87	1
Team:	4800	80	42	26	12	221	2.76	2

Playoffs
Scoring

Player	Pos	GP	G	A	Pts	PIM	PPG	SHG	GWG
Bob Bourne	C	20	8	20	28	14	0	1	2
Mike Bossy	RW	19	17	9	26	10	6	0	5
Brent Sutter	C	20	10	11	21	26	3	0	0
Duane Sutter	RW	20	9	12	21	43	2	0	1
Denis Potvin	D	20	8	12	20	22	4	0	1
Bryan Trottier	C	17	8	12	20	18	3	0	1
John Tonelli	LW	20	7	11	18	20	0	0	2
Anders Kallur	RW	20	3	12	15	12	1	1	0
Bob Nystrom	RW	20	7	6	13	15	0	0	0
Ken Morrow	D	19	5	7	12	18	0	0	0
Butch Goring	C	20	4	8	12	4	0	0	1
Tomas Jonsson	D	20	2	10	12	18	0	0	0
Stefan Persson	D	18	1	5	6	18	1	0	0
Wayne Merrick	C	19	1	3	4	10	0	0	0
Gord Lane	D	18	1	2	3	32	0	0	1
Billy Carroll	C	20	1	1	2	2	0	1	0
Clark Gillies	LW	8	0	2	2	10	0	0	0
Dave Langevin	D	8	0	2	2	2	0	0	0
Mike McEwen	D	12	0	2	2	4	0	0	0
Greg Gilbert	LW	10	1	0	1	14	0	0	0
Mats Hallin	LW	7	1	0	1	6	0	0	1
Billy Smith	G	17	0	1	1	9	0	0	0
Paul Boutilier	D	2	0	0	0	2	0	0	0
Roland Melanson	G	5	0	0	0	0	0	0	0

Goaltending

Player	MIN	GP	W	L	GA	GAA	SO
Billy Smith	962	17	13	3	43	2.68	2
Roland Melanson	238	5	2	2	10	2.52	0
Team:	1200	20	15	5	53	2.65	2

Note: Pos = Position; GP = Games played; G = Goals; A = Assists; Pts = Points; +/- = plus/minus; PIM = Penalty minutes; PPG = Power-play goals; SHG = Short-handed goals; GWG = Game-winning goals
MIN = Minutes played; W = Wins; L = Losses; T = Ties; GA = Goals-against; GAA = Goals-against average; SO = Shutouts;

== Playoffs ==
=== Stanley Cup Finals ===
New York Islanders vs. Edmonton Oilers

Date	Visitors	Score	Home	Score	Notes
May 10	New York	2	Edmonton	0	
May 12	New York	6	Edmonton	3	
May 14	Edmonton	1	New York	5	
May 16	Edmonton	2	New York	4	

New York wins the series 4–0.

== Awards and records ==
- Prince of Wales Trophy
- Conn Smythe Trophy: || Billy Smith
- Lady Byng Memorial Trophy: || Mike Bossy
- William M. Jennings Trophy: || Roland Melanson/Billy Smith
- Lester Patrick Trophy: || Bill Torrey
- Mike Bossy, Right Wing, NHL First All-Star Team
- Roland Melanson, Goaltender, NHL Second All-Star Team

Preceded by New York Islanders; 1982	New York Islanders; Stanley Cup Champions; 1983	Succeeded by Edmonton Oilers; 1984
