= 1982–83 Philadelphia Flyers season =

NHL hockey team season

1982–83 Philadelphia Flyers
- Patrick Division champions
- Division: 1st Patrick
- Conference: 2nd Wales
- 1982–83 record: 49–23–8
- Home record: 29–8–3
- Road record: 20–15–5
- Goals for: 326 (6th)
- Goals against: 240 (3rd)

Team information
- General manager: Keith Allen
- Coach: Bob McCammon
- Captain: Bill Barber (Oct.–Jan.); Bobby Clarke (Jan.–Apr.)
- Alternate captains: None (Note: The alternate captain position was abolished from the 1975–76 season through the 1984–85 season.)
- Arena: Spectrum
- Average attendance: 16,847
- Minor league affiliates: Maine Mariners; Toledo Goaldiggers

Team leaders
- Goals: Darryl Sittler (43)
- Assists: Bobby Clarke (62)
- Points: Bobby Clarke (85)
- Penalty minutes: Glen Cochrane (237)
- Plus/minus: Mark Howe (+47)
- Wins: Pelle Lindbergh (23)
- Goals against average: Bob Froese (2.52)

The 1982–83 Philadelphia Flyers season was the franchise's 16th season in the National Hockey League (NHL). The Flyers lost in the Patrick Division Semifinals to the New York Rangers in three games.

== Off-season ==
Mark Howe, son of hockey legend Gordie Howe and a star defenseman in his own right, was acquired via a trade with the Hartford Whalers prior to the season.

== Regular season ==
Howe immediately became the team's best defenseman garnering 67 points and a +47 in 76 games. Midway through the season, Bob McCammon replaced Barber as captain with Bobby Clarke. Clarke led the team in points and Brian Propp and Sittler scored 40 goals each as the Flyers won a Patrick Division title with 106 points.

=== Season standings ===
Patrick Division
	GP	W	L	T	GF	GA	Pts
**Philadelphia Flyers**	80	49	23	8	326	240	106
**New York Islanders**	80	42	26	12	302	226	96
**Washington Capitals**	80	39	25	16	306	283	94
**New York Rangers**	80	35	35	10	306	287	80
New Jersey Devils	80	17	49	14	230	338	48
Pittsburgh Penguins	80	18	53	9	250	394	45

Note: GP = Games played, W = Wins, L = Losses, T = Ties, Pts = Points, GF = Goals for, GA = Goals against
Note: Teams that qualified for the playoffs are highlighted in bold.

=== Record vs. opponents ===
Patrick Division record vs. opponents

==== Vs. Wales Conference ====
**Vs. Patrick Division**

1982–83 NHL records
Team	**NJD**	**NYI**	**NYR**	**PHI**	**PIT**	**WSH**	**Total**
New Jersey	—	0−7	3−3−1	2−5	3−1−3	0−6−1	8−22−5
N.Y. Islanders	7−0	—	4−3	1−4−2	5−2	4−2−1	21−11−3
N.Y. Rangers	3−3−1	3−4	—	3−4	5−1−1	3−3−1	17−15−3
Philadelphia	5−2	4−1−2	4−3	—	5−1−1	3−4	21−11−3
Pittsburgh	1−3−3	2−5	1−5−1	1–5–1	—	1−5−1	6−23−6
Washington	6−0−1	2−4−1	3−3−1	4–3	5–1–1	—	20−11−4

**Vs. Adams Division**

1982–83 NHL records
Team	**BOS**	**BUF**	**HFD**	**MTL**	**QUE**	**Total**
New Jersey	0−1−2	0−2−1	1−2	1−2	1−2	3−9−3
N.Y. Islanders	0−2−1	1−2	2−1	1−0−2	1−1−1	5−6−4
N.Y. Rangers	0−3	0−2−1	2−1	1−2	1−2	4−10−1
Philadelphia	0−2−1	1−2	2−1	1−2	3−0	7−7−1
Pittsburgh	1−2	1−1−1	3−0	1−2	0−3	6−8−1
Washington	3−0	0−3	2−0−1	0−1−2	1−1−1	6−5−4

==== Vs. Campbell Conference ====
**Vs. Norris Division**

1982–83 NHL records
Team	**CHI**	**DET**	**MIN**	**STL**	**TOR**	**Total**
New Jersey	0−3	1−1−1	0−3	0−2−1	1−0−2	2−9−4
N.Y. Islanders	1−1−1	0−2−1	0−2−1	2−1	2−1	5−7−3
N.Y. Rangers	0−3	2−0−1	2−1	2−0−1	3−0	9−4−2
Philadelphia	1−1−1	3−0	1−1−1	3−0	2−0−1	10−2−3
Pittsburgh	0−3	0−2−1	0−2−1	0−3	1−2	1−12−2
Washington	2−0−1	2−1	1−1−1	1−1−1	2−1	8−4−3

**Vs. Smythe Division**

1982–83 NHL records
Team	**CGY**	**EDM**	**LAK**	**VAN**	**WIN**	**Total**
New Jersey	1−2	0−3	1−2	1−0−2	1−2	4−9−2
N.Y. Islanders	2−0−1	3−0	3−0	2−1	1−1−1	11−2−2
N.Y. Rangers	2−0−1	0−3	1−1−1	1−1−1	1−1−1	5−6−4
Philadelphia	3−0	2−1	2−1	1−1−1	3−0	11−3−1
Pittsburgh	0−3	1−2	2−1	1−2	1−2	5−10−0
Washington	2−1	0−2−1	1−1−1	1−1−1	1−0−2	5−5−5

== Playoffs ==
For the second consecutive year, the Flyers were eliminated by the Rangers in the first round, this time in a three-game sweep. They allowed a total of 18 goals in the three games.

== Schedule and results ==
=== Regular season ===
1982–83 regular season
October: 8–5–0, 16 points (home: 5–1–0; road: 3–4–0)

Game	Date	Score	Opponent	Decision	Record	Points	Recap
1	October 7	9–5	Quebec Nordiques	St. Croix	1–0–0	2	W
2	October 9	3–2	@ Washington Capitals	St. Croix	2–0–0	4	W
3	October 10	6–4	Washington Capitals	St. Croix	3–0–0	6	W
4	October 13	2–5	@ New York Rangers	St. Croix	3–1–0	6	L
5	October 14	4–2	Buffalo Sabres	St. Croix	4–1–0	8	W
6	October 16	4–3	@ Quebec Nordiques	St. Croix	5–1–0	10	W
7	October 18	1–3	@ New Jersey Devils	St. Croix	5–2–0	10	L
8	October 21	1–2	Montreal Canadiens	St. Croix	5–3–0	10	L
9	October 23	2–4	@ Pittsburgh Penguins	St. Croix	5–4–0	10	L
10	October 24	7–4	Detroit Red Wings	St. Croix	6–4–0	12	W
11	October 28	9–2	Pittsburgh Penguins	Lindbergh	7–4–0	14	W
12	October 30	2–3	@ Minnesota North Stars	Lindbergh	7–5–0	14	L
13	October 31	3–2	@ Winnipeg Jets	St. Croix	8–5–0	16	W

November: 5–4–3, 13 points (home: 3–2–2; road: 2–2–1)

Game	Date	Score	Opponent	Decision	Record	Points	Recap
14	November 4	3–4	Vancouver Canucks	Lindbergh	8–6–0	16	L
15	November 6	6–3	@ New York Islanders	St. Croix	9–6–0	18	W
16	November 7	2–2	New York Islanders	St. Croix	9–6–1	19	T
17	November 10	2–7	@ Buffalo Sabres	St. Croix	9–7–1	19	L
18	November 11	7–3	New York Rangers	Lindbergh	10–7–1	21	W
19	November 13	3–4	Edmonton Oilers	Lindbergh	10–8–1	21	L
20	November 18	3–2	Calgary Flames	Lindbergh	11–8–1	23	W
21	November 20	4–6	@ Montreal Canadiens	Lindbergh	11–9–1	23	L
22	November 21	3–1	St. Louis Blues	Lindbergh	12–9–1	25	W
23	November 24	4–4	Boston Bruins	Lindbergh	12–9–2	26	T
24	November 27	4–0	@ Los Angeles Kings	Lindbergh	13–9–2	28	W
25	November 28	5–5	@ Vancouver Canucks	Lindbergh	13–9–3	29	T

December: 8–3–2, 18 points (home: 3–1–0; road: 5–2–2)

Game	Date	Score	Opponent	Decision	Record	Points	Recap
26	December 1	4–2	@ Edmonton Oilers	Lindbergh	14–9–3	31	W
27	December 4	0–0	@ Pittsburgh Penguins	Lindbergh	14–9–4	32	T
28	December 5	4–6	@ Boston Bruins	Lindbergh	14–10–4	32	L
29	December 9	4–1	Quebec Nordiques	Lindbergh	15–10–4	34	W
30	December 11	4–7	@ Hartford Whalers	Lindbergh	15–11–4	34	L
31	December 12	4–3	Pittsburgh Penguins	Lindbergh	16–11–4	36	W
32	December 16	7–2	Detroit Red Wings	Lindbergh	17–11–4	38	W
33	December 18	4–4	@ New York Islanders	Lindbergh	17–11–5	39	T
34	December 19	1–3	Washington Capitals	Lindbergh	17–12–5	39	L
35	December 22	3–1	@ New Jersey Devils	Lindbergh	18–12–5	41	W
36	December 26	6–3	@ Washington Capitals	Lindbergh	19–12–5	43	W
37	December 27	8–4	@ Detroit Red Wings	Lindbergh	20–12–5	45	W
38	December 30	6–3	@ Calgary Flames	Lindbergh	21–12–5	47	W

January: 12–1–2, 26 points (home: 7–0–1; road: 5–1–1)

Game	Date	Score	Opponent	Decision	Record	Points	Recap
39	January 1	4–1	@ St. Louis Blues	Lindbergh	22–12–5	49	W
40	January 2	3–1	@ Chicago Black Hawks	Lindbergh	23–12–5	51	W
41	January 4	4–1	Vancouver Canucks	Lindbergh	24–12–5	53	W
42	January 8	7–4	@ Hartford Whalers	Froese	25–12–5	55	W
43	January 9	8–4	Hartford Whalers	St. Croix	26–12–5	57	W
44	January 13	8–1	Pittsburgh Penguins	Froese	27–12–5	59	W
45	January 15	4–4	Chicago Black Hawks	Larocque	27–12–6	60	T
46	January 16	4–0	@ New York Rangers	Froese	28–12–6	62	W
47	January 18	1–4	@ Washington Capitals	Larocque	28–13–6	62	L
48	January 20	5–2	Calgary Flames	Froese	29–13–6	64	W
49	January 22	1–0	@ New York Islanders	Froese	30–13–6	66	W
50	January 23	3–1	New York Rangers	Froese	31–13–6	68	W
51	January 25	5–1	New Jersey Devils	Froese	32–13–6	70	W
52	January 27	5–2	Winnipeg Jets	Froese	33–13–6	72	W
53	January 29	2–2	@ Minnesota North Stars	Froese	33–13–7	73	T

February: 8–2–0, 16 points (home: 6–1–0; road: 2–1–0)

Game	Date	Score	Opponent	Decision	Record	Points	Recap
54	February 2	6–3	@ Winnipeg Jets	Froese	34–13–7	75	W
55	February 5	2–0	@ Los Angeles Kings	Lindbergh	35–13–7	77	W
56	February 10	5–2	St. Louis Blues	Lindbergh	36–13–7	79	W
57	February 13	4–5	Los Angeles Kings	Lindbergh	36–14–7	79	L
58	February 17	7–3	Edmonton Oilers	Froese	37–14–7	81	W
59	February 19	8–5	New York Rangers	Froese	38–14–7	83	W
60	February 20	3–0	New Jersey Devils	Froese	39–14–7	85	W
61	February 23	2–4	@ Buffalo Sabres	Froese	39–15–7	85	L
62	February 24	6–3	Pittsburgh Penguins	Froese	40–15–7	87	W
63	February 27	2–0	New York Islanders	Froese	41–15–7	89	W

March: 6–8–1, 13 points (home: 4–3–0; road: 2–5–1)

Game	Date	Score	Opponent	Decision	Record	Points	Recap
64	March 2	2–2	@ Toronto Maple Leafs	Froese	41–15–8	90	T
65	March 3	4–1	@ New Jersey Devils	Lindbergh	42–15–8	92	W
66	March 5	3–4	@ Washington Capitals	Lindbergh	42–16–8	92	L
67	March 6	5–3	@ Pittsburgh Penguins	Lindbergh	43–16–8	94	W
68	March 8	1–4	Chicago Black Hawks	Lindbergh	43–17–8	94	L
69	March 10	6–3	Minnesota North Stars	Froese	44–17–8	96	W
70	March 12	2–5	@ Boston Bruins	Froese	44–18–8	96	L
71	March 14	2–8	@ New York Rangers	Lindbergh	44–19–8	96	L
72	March 17	6–4	Montreal Canadiens	Froese	45–19–8	98	W
73	March 19	2–9	@ New York Islanders	Froese	45–20–8	98	L
74	March 20	2–3	Washington Capitals	Lindbergh	45–21–8	98	L
75	March 24	7–4	Toronto Maple Leafs	Lindbergh	46–21–8	100	W
76	March 25	5–6	@ New Jersey Devils	Lindbergh	46–22–8	100	L
77	March 27	4–1	New Jersey Devils	Froese	47–22–8	102	W
78	March 31	2–4	New York Rangers	Froese	47–23–8	102	L

April: 2–0–0, 4 points (home: 1–0–0; road: 1–0–0)

Game	Date	Score	Opponent	Decision	Record	Points	Recap
79	April 2	6–3	@ Toronto Maple Leafs	Lindbergh	48–23–8	104	W
80	April 3	4–2	New York Islanders	Lindbergh	49–23–8	106	W

Legend: W Win (2 points) L Loss (0 points) T Tie (1 point)

=== Playoffs ===
1983 Stanley Cup playoffs
Patrick Division Semifinals vs. New York Rangers – Rangers win 3–0

Game	Date	Score	Opponent	Decision	Series	Recap
1	April 5	3–5	New York Rangers	Lindbergh	Rangers lead 1–0	L
2	April 7	3–4	New York Rangers	Lindbergh	Rangers lead 2–0	L
3	April 9	3–9	@ New York Rangers	Lindbergh	Rangers win 3–0	L

Legend: W Win L Loss

== Player statistics ==
=== Scoring ===
- Position abbreviations: C = Center; D = Defense; G = Goaltender; LW = Left wing; RW = Right wing
- † = Joined team via a transaction (e.g., trade, waivers, signing) during the season. Stats reflect time with the Flyers only.
- ‡ = Left team via a transaction (e.g., trade, waivers, release) during the season. Stats reflect time with the Flyers only.

No.	Player	Pos	Regular season						Playoffs					
No.	Player	Pos	GP	G	A	Pts	+/-	PIM	GP	G	A	Pts	+/-	PIM
16	Bobby Clarke	C	80	23	62	85	37	115	3	1	0	1	1	2
27	Darryl Sittler	C	80	43	40	83	17	60	3	1	0	1	−4	4
26	Brian Propp	LW	80	40	42	82	35	72	3	1	2	3	−4	8
2	Mark Howe	D	76	20	47	67	47	18	3	0	2	2	−3	4
11	Ron Flockhart	RW	73	29	31	60	3	49	2	1	1	2	−1	2
7	Bill Barber	LW	66	27	33	60	17	28	3	1	1	2	−4	2
19	Ray Allison	RW	67	21	30	51	30	57	3	0	1	1	−2	12
23	Ilkka Sinisalo	LW	61	21	29	50	18	16	3	1	1	2	−1	0
17	Paul Holmgren	RW	77	19	24	43	18	178	3	0	0	0	−2	6
18	Lindsay Carson	C	78	18	19	37	20	68	1	0	0	0	−1	0
9	Miroslav Dvorak	D	80	4	33	37	27	20	3	0	1	1	−5	0
15	Mark Taylor	LW	61	8	25	33	25	25	3	0	0	0	−3	0
3	Behn Wilson	D	62	8	24	32	3	92	3	0	1	1	−1	2
25	Paul Evans	C	58	8	20	28	16	20	1	0	0	0	0	0
10	Brad McCrimmon	D	79	4	21	25	24	61	3	0	0	0	1	4
29	Glen Cochrane	D	77	2	22	24	42	237	3	0	0	0	−4	4
12	Tim Kerr	RW	24	11	8	19	4	6	2	2	0	2	0	0
22	Tom Gorence	RW	53	7	7	14	4	10	—	—	—	—	—	—
24 (Note: Hoffmeyer wore number 34 in his first eight games after being acquired.)	Bob Hoffmeyer†	D	35	2	11	13	7	40	1	0	0	0	0	0
8	Brad Marsh	D	68	2	11	13	20	52	2	0	1	1	−4	0
5	Frank Bathe	D	57	1	8	9	4	72	3	0	0	0	−3	12
13	Dave Michayluk	RW	13	2	6	8	1	8	—	—	—	—	—	—
31	Pelle Lindbergh	G	40	0	4	4		0	3	0	0	0		4
21 (Note: Paddock wore number 32 in his first seven games.)	John Paddock	RW	10	2	1	3	−6	4	—	—	—	—	—	—
20 (Note: Poulin wore number 34 during the regular season.)	Dave Poulin	C	2	2	0	2	1	2	3	1	3	4	1	9
34	Andy Brickley	LW	3	1	1	2	−1	0	—	—	—	—	—	—
14	Ron Sutter	C	10	1	1	2	0	9	—	—	—	—	—	—
35	Bob Froese	G	25	0	2	2		2	—	—	—	—	—	—
6	Fred Arthur‡	D	3	0	1	1	−1	2	—	—	—	—	—	—
32	Dave Brown	RW	2	0	0	0	−1	5	—	—	—	—	—	—
32	Ross Fitzpatrick	C	1	0	0	0	−1	0	—	—	—	—	—	—
33	Michel Larocque†	G	2	0	0	0		0	—	—	—	—	—	—
30	Rick St. Croix‡	G	16	0	0	0		0	—	—	—	—	—	—
34	Gord Williams	RW	1	0	0	0	0	0	—	—	—	—	—	—

=== Goaltending ===
- † = Joined team via a transaction (e.g., trade, waivers, signing) during the season. Stats reflect time with the Flyers only.
- ‡ = Left team via a transaction (e.g., trade, waivers, release) during the season. Stats reflect time with the Flyers only.

No.	Player	Regular season											Playoffs									
No.	Player	GP	GS	W	L	T	SA	GA	GAA	SV%	SO	TOI	GP	GS	W	L	SA	GA	GAA	SV%	SO	TOI
31	Pelle Lindbergh	40	39	23	13	3	1053	116	2.99	.890	3	2,329	3	3	0	3	85	18	6.10	.788	0	177
35	Bob Froese	25	23	17	4	2	569	59	2.52	.896	4	1,405	—	—	—	—	—	—	—	—	—	—
30	Rick St. Croix‡	16	16	9	5	2	431	54	3.45	.875	0	938	—	—	—	—	—	—	—	—	—	—
33	Michel Larocque†	2	2	0	1	1	56	8	4.00	.857	0	120	—	—	—	—	—	—	—	—	—	—

== Awards and records ==
=== Awards ===
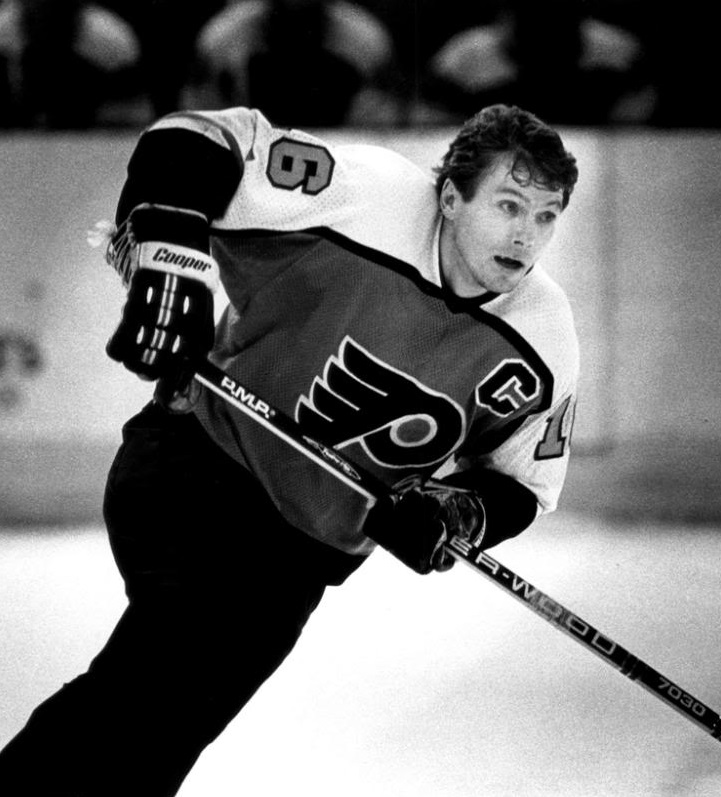
Bobby Clarke won the Frank J. Selke Trophy, awarded annually to the "forward who demonstrates the most skill in the defensive component of the game", for the 1982–83 season.

Type	Award/honor	Recipient	Ref
League (annual)	Frank J. Selke Trophy	Bobby Clarke	
League (annual)	NHL All-Rookie Team	Pelle Lindbergh (Goaltender)	
League (annual)	NHL first All-Star team	Mark Howe (Defense)	
League (in-season)	NHL All-Star Game selection	Mark Howe	
League (in-season)	NHL All-Star Game selection	Pelle Lindbergh	
League (in-season)	NHL All-Star Game selection	Darryl Sittler	
League (in-season)	NHL Player of the Month	Bob Froese (January) (Note: Co-winner with Boston Bruins' Pete Peeters)	
League (in-season)	NHL Player of the Week	Bobby Clarke (January 3)	
League (in-season)	NHL Player of the Week	Bob Froese (February 21)	
Team	Barry Ashbee Trophy	Mark Howe	
Team	Class Guy Award	Mark Howe	
Miscellaneous	Viking Award	Pelle Lindbergh	

=== Records ===
Among the team records set during the 1982–83 season was the 31 seconds it took to score the fastest two goals from the start of a period on October 28, which is tied for the team record. Goaltender Pelle Lindbergh set three consecutive wins records. From December 22 to February 10, Lindbergh won nine consecutive games, which is tied for the team record among all goalies and the record for rookie goaltenders. His eight consecutive road wins from December 22 to March 3 is also the team record. The team's eight consecutive road wins from December 22 to January 16 is the longest in team history. Brian Propp's twelve game-winning goals on the season is tied for the team record.

=== Milestones ===
Milestone	Player	Date	Ref
First game	Miroslav Dvorak	October 7, 1982	
First game	Ron Sutter	November 28, 1982	
First game	Ross Fitzpatrick	December 5, 1982	
First game	Bob Froese	January 8, 1983	
First game	Andy Brickley	March 10, 1983	
First game	Dave Brown	March 12, 1983	
First game	Dave Poulin	April 2, 1983	
1000th game played	Bobby Clarke	October 23, 1982	
1000th point	Darryl Sittler	January 20, 1983	

== Transactions ==
The Flyers were involved in the following transactions from May 17, 1982, the day after the deciding game of the 1982 Stanley Cup Final, through May 17, 1983, the day of the deciding game of the 1983 Stanley Cup Final.

=== Trades ===
Date	Details		Ref
June 9, 1982	To Philadelphia Flyers: Brad McCrimmon	To Boston Bruins: Pete Peeters	
August 20, 1982	To Philadelphia Flyers: Mark Howe; 3rd-round pick in 1983	To Hartford Whalers: Greg Adams; Ken Linseman; 1st-round pick in 1983; 3rd-round pick in 1983	
October 22, 1982	To Philadelphia Flyers: Bob Hoffmeyer	To Edmonton Oilers: Peter Dineen	
January 10, 1983	To Philadelphia Flyers: Michel Larocque	To Toronto Maple Leafs: Rick St. Croix	

=== Players acquired ===
Date	Player	Former team	Via	Ref
January 4, 1983	John Paddock	Maine Mariners (AHL)	Free agency	
March 8, 1983	Dave Poulin	University of Notre Dame (CCHA)	Free agency	

=== Players lost ===
Date	Player	New team	Via	Ref
August 24, 1982	Bob Dailey		Retirement	
August 25, 1982	Reggie Leach	Detroit Red Wings	Free agency	
September 9, 1982	Reid Bailey	Edmonton Oilers (Note: Bailey signed with Edmonton on October 27.)	Release	
September 9, 1982	Al Hill	Edmonton Oilers (Note: Hill signed with Edmonton on November 10.)	Release	
September 9, 1982	Gary Morrison (Note: Morrison retired.)		Release	
N/A	Mike Busniuk	SG Brunico (Serie A)	Free agency	
October 4, 1982	Bob Hoffmeyer	Edmonton Oilers	Waiver draft	
October 6, 1982	Jimmy Watson		Retirement	
October 25, 1982	Fred Arthur		Retirement	

=== Signings ===
Date	Player	Term	Ref
May 24, 1982	Andre Villeneuve	multi-year	
May 24, 1982	Taras Zytynsky	multi-year	
June 4, 1982	Len Hachborn	3-year	
August 4, 1982	Miroslav Dvorak	multi-year (Note: Dvorak signed "a series of one-year contracts.")	
September 10, 1982	Ron Sutter	multi-year	

== Draft picks ==
Philadelphia's picks at the 1982 NHL entry draft, which was held at the Montreal Forum in Montreal, on June 9, 1982.

Round	Pick	Player	Position	Nationality	Team (league)	Notes
1	4	Ron Sutter	Center	Canada	Lethbridge Broncos (WHL)	(Note: The Flyers acquired the 4th overall pick from the Hartford Whalers along with Ray Allison, Fred Arthur, and the Whalers' third-round pick, 46th overall, for Don Gillen, Rick MacLeish, Blake Wesley, and the Flyers first, second, and third-round picks on July 3, 1981.)
3	46	Miroslav Dvorak	Defense	Czechoslovakia	HC České Budějovice (CZE)	
3	47	Bill Campbell	Defense	Canada	Montreal Juniors (QMJHL)	(Note: The Flyers traded Bob Kelly to the Washington Capitals for the Capitals' third-round pick, 47th overall, on August 21, 1980.)
4	77	Michael Hjalm	Wing	Sweden	Modo Hockey (Elitserien)	
5	98	Todd Bergen	Forward	Canada	Prince Albert Raiders (SJHL)	
6	119	Ron Hextall	Goaltender	Canada	Brandon Wheat Kings (WHL)	
7	140	Dave Brown	Forward	Canada	Saskatoon Blades (WHL)	
8	161	Alain Lavigne	Right wing	Canada	Shawinigan Cataractes (QMJHL)	
9	182	Magnus Roupe	Left wing	Sweden	Färjestad BK (Elitserien)	
10	203	Tom Allen	Goaltender	United States	Michigan Tech University (WCHA)	
11	224	Rick Gal	Forward	Canada	Lethbridge Broncos (WHL)	
12	245	Mark Vichorek	Defense	United States	Sioux City Musketeers (USHL)	

== Farm teams ==
The Flyers were affiliated with the Maine Mariners of the AHL and the Toledo Goaldiggers of the IHL.
