= Bob Hoffmeyer =

Canadian ice hockey player

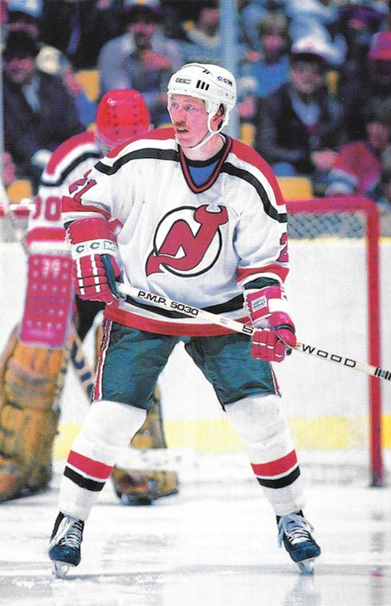
- Born: July 27, 1955 (age 70) Dodsland, Saskatchewan, Canada
- Height: 6 ft 0 in (183 cm)
- Weight: 195 lb (88 kg; 13 st 13 lb)
- Position: Defence
- Shot: Left
- Played for: Chicago Black Hawks; Philadelphia Flyers; New Jersey Devils
- NHL draft: 79th overall, 1975; Chicago Black Hawks
- WHA draft: 55th overall, 1975; Minnesota Fighting Saints
- Playing career: 1975–1986; 1995–1996

Robert Frank Hoffmeyer (born July 27, 1955) is a Canadian former professional ice hockey player. He played 198 games in the National Hockey League (NHL) for the Chicago Black Hawks, Philadelphia Flyers, and New Jersey Devils between 1978 and 1985. The rest of his career, which lasted from 1975 to 1986, was mainly spent in the minor leagues.

== Career statistics ==
=== Regular season and playoffs ===
			Regular season					Playoffs
Season	Team	League	GP	G	A	Pts	PIM	GP	G	A	Pts	PIM
1972–73	Prince Albert Raiders	SJHL	46	3	20	23	—	3	1	2	3	0
1973–74	Saskatoon Blades	WCHL	62	2	10	12	198	6	0	1	1	20
1974–75	Saskatoon Blades	WCHL	64	4	38	42	242	17	2	10	12	69
1975–76	Dallas Black Hawks	CHL	5	0	0	0	11	—	—	—	—	—
1975–76	Flint Generals	IHL	67	3	13	16	145	4	1	1	2	5
1976–77	Flint Generals	IHL	78	12	51	63	213	5	0	7	7	22
1977–78	Chicago Black Hawks	NHL	5	0	1	1	12	5	0	1	1	4
1977–78	Dallas Black Hawks	CHL	67	5	11	16	172	13	1	3	4	40
1978–79	Chicago Black Hawks	NHL	6	0	2	2	5	—	—	—	—	—
1978–79	New Brunswick Hawks	AHL	41	3	6	9	104	—	—	—	—	—
1979–80	New Brunswick Hawks	AHL	77	3	20	23	161	17	0	3	3	38
1980–81	Schwenninger ERC	GER-2	39	22	29	51	131	—	—	—	—	—
1980–81	Maine Mariners	AHL	2	1	1	2	0	20	2	11	13	68
1981–82	Philadelphia Flyers	NHL	57	7	20	27	142	2	0	1	1	25
1981–82	Maine Mariners	AHL	21	6	8	14	57	—	—	—	—	—
1982–83	Philadelphia Flyers	NHL	35	2	11	13	40	1	0	0	0	0
1982–83	Maine Mariners	AHL	23	5	10	15	79	—	—	—	—	—
1983–84	New Jersey Devils	NHL	48	4	12	16	61	—	—	—	—	—
1983–84	Maine Mariners	AHL	14	3	1	4	27	—	—	—	—	—
1984–85	New Jersey Devils	NHL	37	1	6	7	65	—	—	—	—	—
1985–86	Maine Mariners	AHL	8	0	0	0	6	5	0	0	0	0
1985–86	Albany River Rats	AHL	1	0	0	0	0	—	—	—	—	—
AHL totals			187	21	46	67	434	42	2	14	16	112
NHL totals			198	14	52	66	325	3	0	1	1	25
