= Gary Laskoski =

Canadian ice hockey player

- Born: June 6, 1959 (age 65); Ottawa, Ontario, Canada
- Height: 6 ft 1 in (185 cm)
- Weight: 175 lb (79 kg; 12 st 7 lb)
- Position: Goaltender
- Caught: Left
- Played for: Los Angeles Kings
- NHL draft: Undrafted
- Playing career: 1982–1984

Gary Laskoski (born June 6, 1959) is a Canadian former ice hockey goaltender. Laskoski played 59 games in the National Hockey League for the Los Angeles Kings during the 1982–83 and 1983–84 seasons.

== Biography ==
Born in Ottawa, Ontario, Laskoski played 59 games for the Kings over two seasons after playing for the St. Lawrence University Saints of the ECAC for four years. He also played one season with the New Haven Nighthawks of the American Hockey League before retiring in 1984.

== Career statistics ==
=== Regular season and playoffs ===
			Regular season									Playoffs
Season	Team	League	GP	W	L	T	MIN	GA	SO	GAA	SV%	GP	W	L	MIN	GA	SO	GAA	SV%
1978–79	St. Lawrence University	ECAC	21	5	15	0	1130	93	0	4.94	.876	—	—	—	—	—	—	—	—
1979–80	St. Lawrence University	ECAC	17	3	13	0	904	72	0	4.78	.882	—	—	—	—	—	—	—	—
1980–81	St. Lawrence University	ECAC	21	10	10	1	1196	64	0	3.21	.902	—	—	—	—	—	—	—	—
1981–82	St. Lawrence University	ECAC	15	7	7	0	851	50	0	3.53	—	—	—	—	—	—	—	—	—
1982–83	Los Angeles Kings	NHL	46	15	20	4	2277	173	0	4.56	.857	—	—	—	—	—	—	—	—
1983–84	Los Angeles Kings	NHL	13	4	7	1	663	55	0	4.98	.828	—	—	—	—	—	—	—	—
1983–84	New Haven Nighthawks	AHL	22	7	12	1	1179	97	2	4.94	.857	—	—	—	—	—	—	—	—
NHL totals			59	19	27	5	2940	228	0	4.65	.851	—	—	—	—	—	—	—	—
