= 1982–83 Pittsburgh Penguins season =

NHL team season

1982–83 Pittsburgh Penguins
- Division: 6th Patrick
- Conference: 11th Wales
- 1982–83 record: 18–53–9
- Home record: 14–22–4
- Road record: 4–31–5
- Goals for: 257
- Goals against: 394

Team information
- General manager: Baz Bastien (Oct-Mar); Eddie Johnston (Mar-Apr) interim
- Coach: Eddie Johnston
- Captain: Randy Carlyle
- Alternate captains: None
- Arena: Pittsburgh Civic Arena

Team leaders
- Goals: Rick Kehoe (29)
- Assists: Greg Malone (44)
- Points: Doug Shedden (67)
- Penalty minutes: Paul Baxter (238)
- Wins: Michel Dion (12)
- Goals against average: Michel Dion (4.26)

The 1982–83 Pittsburgh Penguins season was their 16th in the National Hockey League (NHL). This was the Penguins worst season to date and missing the playoffs for the first time since the 1977–78 season, winning a meager 18 games and accumulating only 45 points: they finished in last place in the NHL for the first time in franchise history, thus ending their four-season playoff streak.

General Manager Baz Bastien was killed as a result of an automobile collision on March 15, 1983. The team wore black armbands on their home jerseys for the remainder of the season in his honor.

== Regular season ==
=== Final standings ===
Patrick Division
	GP	W	L	T	GF	GA	Pts
**Philadelphia Flyers**	80	49	23	8	326	240	106
**New York Islanders**	80	42	26	12	302	226	96
**Washington Capitals**	80	39	25	16	306	283	94
**New York Rangers**	80	35	35	10	306	287	80
New Jersey Devils	80	17	49	14	230	338	48
Pittsburgh Penguins	80	18	53	9	250	394	45

Note: GP = Games played, W = Wins, L = Losses, T = Ties, Pts = Points, GF = Goals for, GA = Goals against
Note: Teams that qualified for the playoffs are highlighted in bold.

=== Record vs. opponents ===
Patrick Division record vs. opponents

==== Vs. Wales Conference ====
**Vs. Patrick Division**

1982–83 NHL records
Team	**NJD**	**NYI**	**NYR**	**PHI**	**PIT**	**WSH**	**Total**
New Jersey	—	0−7	3−3−1	2−5	3−1−3	0−6−1	8−22−5
N.Y. Islanders	7−0	—	4−3	1−4−2	5−2	4−2−1	21−11−3
N.Y. Rangers	3−3−1	3−4	—	3−4	5−1−1	3−3−1	17−15−3
Philadelphia	5−2	4−1−2	4−3	—	5−1−1	3−4	21−11−3
Pittsburgh	1−3−3	2−5	1−5−1	1–5–1	—	1−5−1	6−23−6
Washington	6−0−1	2−4−1	3−3−1	4–3	5–1–1	—	20−11−4

**Vs. Adams Division**

1982–83 NHL records
Team	**BOS**	**BUF**	**HFD**	**MTL**	**QUE**	**Total**
New Jersey	0−1−2	0−2−1	1−2	1−2	1−2	3−9−3
N.Y. Islanders	0−2−1	1−2	2−1	1−0−2	1−1−1	5−6−4
N.Y. Rangers	0−3	0−2−1	2−1	1−2	1−2	4−10−1
Philadelphia	0−2−1	1−2	2−1	1−2	3−0	7−7−1
Pittsburgh	1−2	1−1−1	3−0	1−2	0−3	6−8−1
Washington	3−0	0−3	2−0−1	0−1−2	1−1−1	6−5−4

==== Vs. Campbell Conference ====
**Vs. Norris Division**

1982–83 NHL records
Team	**CHI**	**DET**	**MIN**	**STL**	**TOR**	**Total**
New Jersey	0−3	1−1−1	0−3	0−2−1	1−0−2	2−9−4
N.Y. Islanders	1−1−1	0−2−1	0−2−1	2−1	2−1	5−7−3
N.Y. Rangers	0−3	2−0−1	2−1	2−0−1	3−0	9−4−2
Philadelphia	1−1−1	3−0	1−1−1	3−0	2−0−1	10−2−3
Pittsburgh	0−3	0−2−1	0−2−1	0−3	1−2	1−12−2
Washington	2−0−1	2−1	1−1−1	1−1−1	2−1	8−4−3

**Vs. Smythe Division**

1982–83 NHL records
Team	**CGY**	**EDM**	**LAK**	**VAN**	**WIN**	**Total**
New Jersey	1−2	0−3	1−2	1−0−2	1−2	4−9−2
N.Y. Islanders	2−0−1	3−0	3−0	2−1	1−1−1	11−2−2
N.Y. Rangers	2−0−1	0−3	1−1−1	1−1−1	1−1−1	5−6−4
Philadelphia	3−0	2−1	2−1	1−1−1	3−0	11−3−1
Pittsburgh	0−3	1−2	2−1	1−2	1−2	5−10−0
Washington	2−1	0−2−1	1−1−1	1−1−1	1−0−2	5−5−5

== Schedule and results ==
1982–83 regular season
October: 3–9–1 (home: 3–4–0; road: 0–5–1), 7 points

#	Date	Visitor	Score	Home	Location	Record	Points
1	Oct 5	Pittsburgh Penguins	3–3	New Jersey Devils	Brendan Byrne Arena	0–0–1	1
2	Oct 9	New York Rangers	5–3	Pittsburgh Penguins	Civic Arena	0–1–1	1
3	Oct 10	Pittsburgh Penguins	3–4	Boston Bruins	Boston Garden	0–2–1	1
4	Oct 12	Vancouver Canucks	4–5	Pittsburgh Penguins	Civic Arena	1–2–1	3
5	Oct 14	Pittsburgh Penguins	0–9	New York Islanders	Nassau Veterans Memorial Coliseum	1–3–1	3
6	Oct 16	New Jersey Devils	6–5	Pittsburgh Penguins	Civic Arena	1–4–1	3
7	Oct 20	St. Louis Blues	5–3	Pittsburgh Penguins	Civic Arena	1–5–1	3
8	Oct 21	Pittsburgh Penguins	4–8	Quebec Nordiques	Quebec Coliseum	1–6–1	3
9	Oct 23	Philadelphia Flyers	2–4	Pittsburgh Penguins	Civic Arena	2–6–1	5
10	Oct 27	Washington Capitals	5–7	Pittsburgh Penguins	Civic Arena	3–6–1	7
11	Oct 28	Pittsburgh Penguins	2–9	Philadelphia Flyers	The Spectrum	3–7–1	7
12	Oct 30	Calgary Flames	4–1	Pittsburgh Penguins	Civic Arena	3–8–1	7
13	Oct 31	Pittsburgh Penguins	2–6	New York Rangers	Madison Square Garden (IV)	3–9–1	7

November: 5–3–3 (home: 4–1–0; road: 1–2–3), 13 points

#	Date	Visitor	Score	Home	Location	Record	Points
14	Nov 2	Pittsburgh Penguins	3–1	New York Islanders	Nassau Veterans Memorial Coliseum	4–9–1	9
15	Nov 4	Pittsburgh Penguins	4–4	New Jersey Devils	Brendan Byrne Arena	4–9–2	10
16	Nov 6	Pittsburgh Penguins	2–6	Los Angeles Kings	The Forum	4–10–2	10
17	Nov 10	Edmonton Oilers	4–5	Pittsburgh Penguins	Civic Arena	5–10–2	12
18	Nov 13	Calgary Flames	3–1	Pittsburgh Penguins	Civic Arena	5–11–2	12
19	Nov 14	Pittsburgh Penguins	6–6	Buffalo Sabres	Buffalo Memorial Auditorium	5–11–3	13
20	Nov 17	Hartford Whalers	3–4	Pittsburgh Penguins	Civic Arena	6–11–3	15
21	Nov 20	Boston Bruins	3–4	Pittsburgh Penguins	Civic Arena	7–11–3	17
22	Nov 24	Toronto Maple Leafs	3–4	Pittsburgh Penguins	Civic Arena	8–11–3	19
23	Nov 26	Pittsburgh Penguins	6–6	Minnesota North Stars	Met Center	8–11–4	20
24	Nov 27	Pittsburgh Penguins	3–5	St. Louis Blues	The Checkerdome	8–12–4	20

December: 3–9–2 (home: 2–4–2; road: 1–5–0), 8 points

#	Date	Visitor	Score	Home	Location	Record	Points
25	Dec 1	Chicago Black Hawks	4–2	Pittsburgh Penguins	Civic Arena	8–13–4	20
26	Dec 2	Pittsburgh Penguins	4–5	Washington Capitals	Capital Centre	8–14–4	20
27	Dec 4	Philadelphia Flyers	0–0	Pittsburgh Penguins	Civic Arena	8–14–5	21
28	Dec 8	Buffalo Sabres	2–4	Pittsburgh Penguins	Civic Arena	9–14–5	23
29	Dec 11	Quebec Nordiques	7–4	Pittsburgh Penguins	Civic Arena	9–15–5	23
30	Dec 12	Pittsburgh Penguins	3–4	Philadelphia Flyers	The Spectrum	9–16–5	23
31	Dec 15	Detroit Red Wings	4–4	Pittsburgh Penguins	Civic Arena	9–16–6	24
32	Dec 18	Washington Capitals	3–1	Pittsburgh Penguins	Civic Arena	9–17–6	24
33	Dec 20	Pittsburgh Penguins	3–6	New York Rangers	Madison Square Garden (IV)	9–18–6	24
34	Dec 21	Pittsburgh Penguins	3–2	Hartford Whalers	Hartford Civic Center Coliseum	10–18–6	26
35	Dec 23	Pittsburgh Penguins	4–6	Detroit Red Wings	Joe Louis Arena	10–19–6	26
36	Dec 26	New York Rangers	3–4	Pittsburgh Penguins	Civic Arena	11–19–6	28
37	Dec 28	Pittsburgh Penguins	3–6	Washington Capitals	Capital Centre	11–20–6	28
38	Dec 29	St. Louis Blues	6–5	Pittsburgh Penguins	Civic Arena	11–21–6	28

January: 1–12–1 (home: 1–5–1; road: 0–7–0), 3 points

#	Date	Visitor	Score	Home	Location	Record	Points
39	Jan 1	New York Islanders	1–2	Pittsburgh Penguins	Civic Arena	12–21–6	30
40	Jan 2	Pittsburgh Penguins	1–5	Montreal Canadiens	Montreal Forum	12–22–6	30
41	Jan 7	Pittsburgh Penguins	2–7	Edmonton Oilers	Northlands Coliseum	12–23–6	30
42	Jan 9	Pittsburgh Penguins	3–4	Winnipeg Jets	Winnipeg Arena	12–24–6	30
43	Jan 12	Minnesota North Stars	7–0	Pittsburgh Penguins	Civic Arena	12–25–6	30
44	Jan 13	Pittsburgh Penguins	1–8	Philadelphia Flyers	The Spectrum	12–26–6	30
45	Jan 15	Montreal Canadiens	8–7	Pittsburgh Penguins	Civic Arena	12–27–6	30
46	Jan 19	New Jersey Devils	1–1	Pittsburgh Penguins	Civic Arena	12–27–7	31
47	Jan 22	Quebec Nordiques	7–3	Pittsburgh Penguins	Civic Arena	12–28–7	31
48	Jan 24	Pittsburgh Penguins	2–8	Toronto Maple Leafs	Maple Leaf Gardens	12–29–7	31
49	Jan 26	Washington Capitals	6–2	Pittsburgh Penguins	Civic Arena	12–30–7	31
50	Jan 28	Pittsburgh Penguins	2–7	Washington Capitals	Capital Centre	12–31–7	31
51	Jan 29	New York Rangers	2–1	Pittsburgh Penguins	Civic Arena	12–32–7	31
52	Jan 31	Pittsburgh Penguins	2–3	New Jersey Devils	Brendan Byrne Arena	12–33–7	31

February: 3–11–0 (home: 3–3–0; road: 0–8–0), 6 points

#	Date	Visitor	Score	Home	Location	Record	Points
53	Feb 2	Pittsburgh Penguins	4–7	Chicago Black Hawks	Chicago Stadium	12–34–7	31
54	Feb 4	Pittsburgh Penguins	4–6	Winnipeg Jets	Winnipeg Arena	12–35–7	31
55	Feb 5	Pittsburgh Penguins	4–7	Calgary Flames	Stampede Corral	12–36–7	31
56	Feb 9	Vancouver Canucks	6–2	Pittsburgh Penguins	Civic Arena	12–37–7	31
57	Feb 10	Pittsburgh Penguins	3–7	Boston Bruins	Boston Garden	12–38–7	31
58	Feb 12	Los Angeles Kings	4–6	Pittsburgh Penguins	Civic Arena	13–38–7	33
59	Feb 15	Detroit Red Wings	7–3	Pittsburgh Penguins	Civic Arena	13–39–7	33
60	Feb 17	Pittsburgh Penguins	1–4	New York Islanders	Nassau Veterans Memorial Coliseum	13–40–7	33
61	Feb 19	Edmonton Oilers	10–7	Pittsburgh Penguins	Civic Arena	13–41–7	33
62	Feb 21	Pittsburgh Penguins	2–4	Toronto Maple Leafs	Maple Leaf Gardens	13–42–7	33
63	Feb 23	Winnipeg Jets	4–6	Pittsburgh Penguins	Civic Arena	14–42–7	35
64	Feb 24	Pittsburgh Penguins	3–6	Philadelphia Flyers	The Spectrum	14–43–7	35
65	Feb 26	New Jersey Devils	4–5	Pittsburgh Penguins	Civic Arena	15–43–7	37
66	Feb 28	Pittsburgh Penguins	3–9	New York Rangers	Madison Square Garden (IV)	15–44–7	37

March: 3–7–2 (home: 1–4–1; road: 2–3–1), 8 points

#	Date	Visitor	Score	Home	Location	Record	Points
67	Mar 1	New York Rangers	3–3	Pittsburgh Penguins	Civic Arena	15–44–8	38
68	Mar 4	Pittsburgh Penguins	2–10	Buffalo Sabres	Buffalo Memorial Auditorium	15–45–8	38
69	Mar 6	Philadelphia Flyers	5–3	Pittsburgh Penguins	Civic Arena	15–46–8	38
70	Mar 10	New York Islanders	4–3	Pittsburgh Penguins	Civic Arena	15–47–8	38
71	Mar 12	Pittsburgh Penguins	7–2	Hartford Whalers	Hartford Civic Center Coliseum	16–47–8	40
72	Mar 13	Chicago Black Hawks	4–3	Pittsburgh Penguins	Civic Arena	16–48–8	40
73	Mar 16	Pittsburgh Penguins	2–3	Minnesota North Stars	Met Center	16–49–8	40
74	Mar 19	Pittsburgh Penguins	7–4	Los Angeles Kings	The Forum	17–49–8	42
75	Mar 21	Pittsburgh Penguins	3–7	Vancouver Canucks	Pacific Coliseum	17–50–8	42
76	Mar 26	Pittsburgh Penguins	4–4	Washington Capitals	Capital Centre	17–50–9	43
77	Mar 27	New York Islanders	4–1	Pittsburgh Penguins	Civic Arena	17–51–9	43
78	Mar 30	Montreal Canadiens	2–3	Pittsburgh Penguins	Civic Arena	18–51–9	45

April: 0–2–0 (home: 0–1–0; road: 0–1–0), 0 points

#	Date	Visitor	Score	Home	Location	Record	Points
79	Apr 2	Pittsburgh Penguins	3–6	New York Islanders	Nassau Veterans Memorial Coliseum	18–52–9	45
80	Apr 3	New Jersey Devils	5–3	Pittsburgh Penguins	Civic Arena	18–53–9	45

Legend: Win (2 points) Loss (0 points) Tie (1 point)

== Player statistics ==
Skaters

Regular season
Player	GP	G	A	Pts	+/−	PIM
Doug Shedden	80	24	43	67	–20	54
Rick Kehoe	75	29	36	65	–45	12
Greg Malone	80	17	44	61	–29	82
Randy Carlyle	61	15	41	56	–26	110
Pat Boutette	80	27	29	56	–33	152
Paul Gardner	70	28	27	55	–23	12
Mike Bullard	57	22	22	44	–21	60
Dave Hannan	74	11	22	33	–28	127
Paul Baxter	75	11	21	32	–49	238
Greg Hotham	58	2	30	32	–14	39
Peter Lee	63	13	13	26	–9	10
André St. Laurent	70	13	9	22	0	105
Anders Håkansson^{†}	62	9	12	21	–11	26
Randy Boyd	56	4	14	18	–36	71
Steve Gatzos	44	6	7	13	–16	52
Pat Price^{‡}	38	1	11	12	–19	104
Gary Rissling	40	5	4	9	–17	128
Kevin McClelland	38	5	4	9	–18	73
Ron Meighan	41	2	6	8	–10	16
Marc Chorney	67	3	5	8	–30	66
Tony Feltrin	32	3	3	6	–11	40
Pat Graham	20	1	5	6	–6	16
Rick MacLeish	6	0	5	5	–5	2
Doug Lecuyer	12	1	4	5	–2	12
Tim Hrynewich	30	2	3	5	–6	48
Rod Buskas	41	2	2	4	–15	102
Stan Jonathan^{†}	19	0	3	3	–8	13
Jim Hamilton	5	0	2	2	–2	2
Bobby Simpson	4	1	0	1	–1	0
George Ferguson^{‡}	7	0	0	0	–7	2
Rod Schutt	5	0	0	0	–2	0
Ian Turnbull	6	0	0	0	–3	4
Rob Garner	1	0	0	0	0	0
Bennett Wolf	5	0	0	0	–2	37
Brian Lundberg	1	0	0	0	–1	2
Rich Sutter	4	0	0	0	–2	0
Total		257	427	684	—	1,817

Goaltenders

Regular Season
Player	GP	TOI	W	L	T	GA	GAA	SA	SV%	SO
Michel Dion	49	2791:00	12	30	4	198	4.26	1511	0.869	0
Denis Herron	31	1707:00	5	18	5	151	5.31	931	0.838	1
Nick Ricci	3	147:00	1	2	0	16	6.53	77	0.792	0
Roberto Romano	3	155:00	0	3	0	18	6.97	96	0.813	0
Total		4800:00	18	53	9	383	4.79	2615	0.854	1

^{†}Denotes player spent time with another team before joining the Penguins. Stats reflect time with the Penguins only.
^{‡}Denotes player was traded mid-season. Stats reflect time with the Penguins only.

== Awards and records ==
- Paul Baxter established a new franchise record for lowest plus-minus with –51. He topped the previous record of –39 held by Ken Schinkel.
- fewest wins in team history (18; broken in 1983–84)
- fewest points in team history (45; broken in 1983–84)

== Transactions ==
The Penguins were involved in the following transactions during the 1982–83 season:

=== Trades ===
September 15, 1982	To Montreal Canadiens 1985 3rd round pick (Bruce Racine)	To Pittsburgh Penguins Denis Herron
October 28, 1982	To Minnesota North Stars George Ferguson; 1983 1st round pick (Brian Lawton)	To Pittsburgh Penguins Anders Hakansson; Ron Meighan; 1983 1st round pick (Bob Errey)
November 8, 1982	To Boston Bruins cash	To Pittsburgh Penguins Stan Jonathan

=== Additions and subtractions ===
Additions
Player	Former team	Via
Marty McSorley	Belleville Bulls (OHL)	free agency (1982-07-30)
Doug Lecuyer	Winnipeg Jets	waiver draft (1982-10-04)
Ian Turnbull	Los Angeles Kings	free agency (1982-10-04)
Phil Bourque	Kingston Canadians (OHL)	free agency (1982-10-04)
Roberto Romano	Hull Olympiques (QMJHL)	free agency (1982-12-06)
Darren Lowe	Canadian national team	free agency (1983–02)

Subtractions
Player	New team	Via
Pat Price	Quebec Nordiques	waivers (1982-12-31)

== Draft picks ==
The 1982 NHL entry draft was held on June 9, 1982, in Montreal.

Round	#	Player	Pos	Nationality	College/Junior/Club team (League)
1	10	Richard Sutter	Right wing	Canada	Lethbridge Broncos (WHL)
2	38	Tim Hrynewich	Left wing	Canada	Sudbury Wolves (OHL)
3	52	Troy Loney	Left wing	Canada	Lethbridge Broncos (WHL)
5	94	Grant Sasser	Center	United States	Portland Winter Hawks (WHL)
7	136	Grant Couture	Defense	Canada	Lethbridge Broncos (WHL)
8	157	Peter Derksen	Left wing	Canada	Portland Winter Hawks (WHL)
9	178	Greg Gravel	Center	Canada	Windsor Spitfires (OHL)
10	199	Stu Wenaas	Defense	Canada	Winnipeg Warriors (WHL)
11	220	Chris McCauley	Center	Canada	London Knights (OHL)
12	241	Stanley Bautch	Goaltender	United States	Hibbing H.S. (Minn.)

== See also ==
- 1982–83 NHL season
