= Roland Melanson =

Canadian ice hockey player and coach

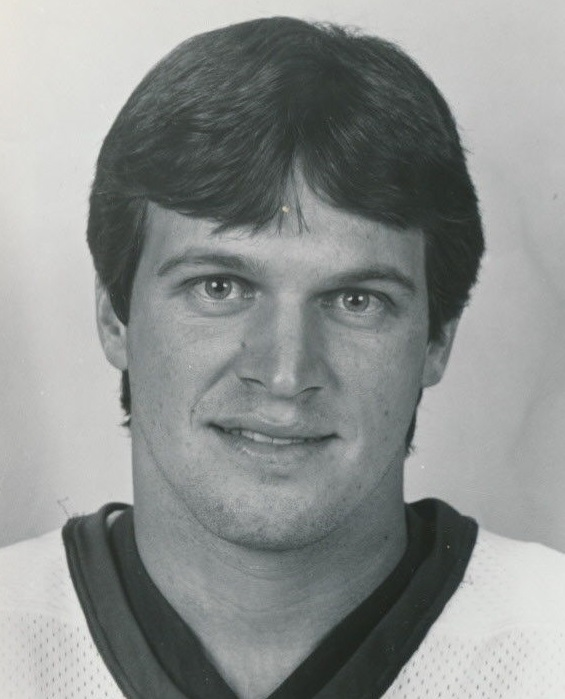
- Melanson with the New York Islanders in 1984
- Born: June 28, 1960 (age 66) Shediac, New Brunswick, Canada
- Height: 5 ft 10 in (178 cm)
- Weight: 185 lb (84 kg; 13 st 3 lb)
- Position: Goaltender
- Caught: Left
- Played for: New York Islanders; Minnesota North Stars; Los Angeles Kings; New Jersey Devils; Montreal Canadiens
- NHL draft: 59th overall, 1979; New York Islanders
- Playing career: 1977–1994

Roland Joseph "Rollie the Goalie" Melanson (born June 28, 1960) is a Canadian ice hockey coach and former goaltender in the National Hockey League (NHL). After a lengthy career in the NHL with the New York Islanders, Minnesota North Stars, Los Angeles Kings, New Jersey Devils, and Montreal Canadiens, Melanson began working as a goaltending coach.

While playing for the Indianapolis Checkers in 1981, Melanson won the Ken McKenzie Trophy as rookie of the year of the Central Hockey League. Along with Billy Smith, Melanson won the William M. Jennings Trophy in the 1982–83 season, and he was also named to the NHL All-Star Second Team. He also won three consecutive Stanley Cups in 1981, 1982 and 1983.

== Early life ==
Melanson was born on June 28, 1960, in Shediac, New Brunswick (Note: Although many sources mistakenly list Moncton as his birthplace) to parents Alphe and Albertine (née Maillet) Melanson. Although he started skating in Moncton, Melanson only joined an organized hockey team as a goaltender when his family moved to Waltham, Massachusetts. He spent four years in the United States before his family moved back to New Brunswick. Due to his success in Waltham, Melanson was able to join a stronger and older hockey team once back in New Brunswick.

== Career ==
=== Junior ===
Melanson played minor ice hockey with the Moncton Century Flyers AAA team during the 1976-77 season. He recorded 11 shutouts during the season to help the Flyers finish with a 33–1 record. He also posted a shutout in the final game of the 1976 Moncton Invitational Midget Hockey Tournament to help the Flyers beat Fredericton 3–0. In the same season, he also competed with the Flyers in the 1977 Wrigley Cup midget hockey championships. While the Flyers finished in fourth place, Melanson was named Wrigley Cup MVP for maintaining a 2.33 goals against average (GAA). As of 2025, Melanson's 4–1–1 preliminary round record still stands as the best record for a New Brunswick team at the National Midget Championship. Due to his play during the tournament, Melanson earned the attention of Windsor Spitfires coach Wayne Maxner. He subsequently signed a contract with the Spitfires to play with them in the Ontario Junior Hockey League.

=== Professional ===
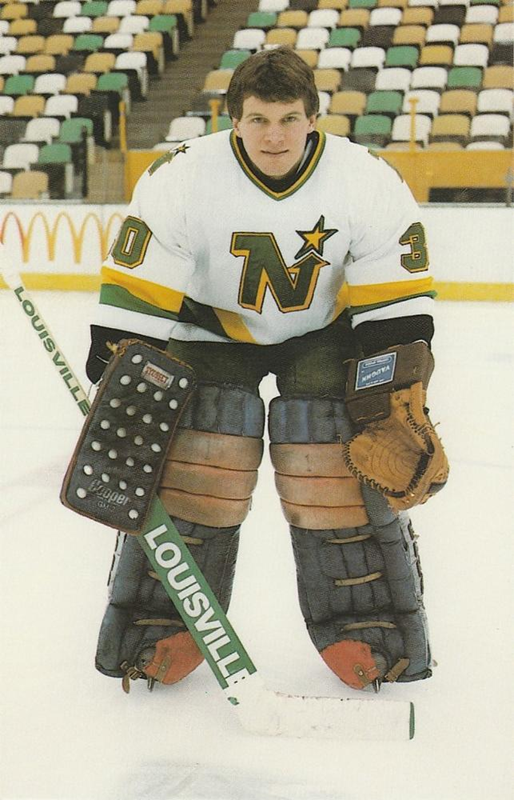
Melanson with the Minnesota North Stars in 1984

After participating in the Islanders' training camp, Melanson was reassigned to their minor league affiliate, the Indianapolis Checkers, to start the 1980–81 season. Upon joining the Checkers, Melanson played in their first nine games and led them to a 7–1–1 start while also maintaining a league-leading 2.40 GAA. After being called up to the NHL on November 4, 1980, Melanson made his NHL debut the following night against Detroit Red Wings. He stopped 29 of 33 shots to lead the Islanders to a 6–4 win. He remained unbeaten through his next five games, becoming the first NHL rookie goaltender of the season to maintain an unbeaten streak. Melanson also received praise from teammates and opposing coaches during this stretch and was repeatedly named the First Star of the Game. However, he was returned to the CHL on November 16 after veteran goaltender Chico Resch recovered from his injury. As neither of the Islanders veteran goaltenders were eligible to be reassigned to the CHL, the team was forced to return Melanson once they both recovered.

== Personal life ==
Melanson married Janice LeBlanc in July 1981. They had two children together before divorcing.

== Career statistics ==
=== Regular season and playoffs ===
Bold indicates led league

			Regular season									Playoffs
Season	Team	League	GP	W	L	T	MIN	GA	SO	GAA	SV%	GP	W	L	T	MIN	GA	SO	GAA	SV%
1976–77	Moncton Flyers	NBAHA	70	—	—	—	4198	147	14	2.09	—	6	4	1	1	360	14	0	2.33	—
1977–78	Windsor Spitfires	OMJHL	44	—	—	—	2592	195	1	4.51	—	5	1	2	1	258	13	1	3.02	—
1978–79	Windsor Spitfires	OMJHL	62	—	—	—	3461	254	1	4.40	—	7	—	—	—	392	31	0	4.74	—
1979–80	Windsor Spitfires	OMJHL	22	11	8	0	1099	90	0	4.91	—	—	—	—	—	—	—	—	—	—
1979–80	Oshawa Generals	OMJHL	38	26	12	0	2240	136	3	3.64	—	7	3	4	0	420	32	0	4.57	—
1980–81	New York Islanders	NHL	11	8	1	1	620	32	0	3.10	.895	3	1	0	—	92	6	0	3.91	.882
1980–81	Indianapolis Checkers	CHL	52	31	16	3	3056	131	2	2.57	—	—	—	—	—	—	—	—	—	—
1981–82	New York Islanders	NHL	36	22	7	6	2115	114	0	3.23	.896	3	0	1	—	64	5	0	4.69	.828
1982–83	New York Islanders	NHL	44	24	12	5	2460	109	1	2.66	**.910**	5	2	2	—	238	10	0	**2.52**	.913
1983–84	New York Islanders	NHL	37	20	11	2	2019	110	0	3.27	**.903**	6	0	1	—	87	5	0	3.45	.844
1984–85	New York Islanders	NHL	8	3	3	0	425	35	0	4.94	.864	—	—	—	—	—	—	—	—	—
1984–85	Minnesota North Stars	NHL	20	5	10	3	1142	78	0	4.10	.867	—	—	—	—	—	—	—	—	—
1985–86	Minnesota North Stars	NHL	6	2	1	2	325	24	0	4.43	.863	—	—	—	—	—	—	—	—	—
1985–86	Los Angeles Kings	NHL	22	4	16	1	1246	87	0	4.19	.867	—	—	—	—	—	—	—	—	—
1985–86	New Haven Nighthawks	AHL	3	1	2	0	179	13	0	4.36	.882	—	—	—	—	—	—	—	—	—
1986–87	Los Angeles Kings	NHL	46	18	21	6	2734	168	1	3.69	.882	5	1	4	—	260	24	0	5.54	.844
1987–88	Los Angeles Kings	NHL	47	17	20	7	2675	195	2	4.37	.860	1	0	1	—	60	9	0	9.00	.820
1988–89	Los Angeles Kings	NHL	4	1	1	0	178	19	0	6.42	.826	—	—	—	—	—	—	—	—	—
1988–89	New Haven Nighthawks	AHL	29	11	15	3	1734	106	1	3.67	.887	17	9	8	—	1019	74	1	4.36	—
1989–90	Utica Devils	AHL	48	24	19	3	2737	167	1	3.66	.875	5	1	4	—	298	20	0	4.03	—
1990–91	New Jersey Devils	NHL	1	0	0	0	20	2	0	6.00	.714	—	—	—	—	—	—	—	—	—
1990–91	Utica Devils	AHL	54	23	28	1	3058	208	0	4.08	.868	—	—	—	—	—	—	—	—	—
1991–92	Montreal Canadiens	NHL	9	5	3	0	492	22	2	2.68	.887	—	—	—	—	—	—	—	—	—
1992–93	Brantford Smoke	ColHL	14	10	4	0	811	54	1	4.00	—	15	11	3	—	844	50	0	3.55	—
1993–94	Saint John Flames	AHL	7	1	2	0	270	20	0	4.44	.800	—	—	—	—	—	—	—	—	—
NHL totals			291	129	106	33	16,450	995	6	3.63	.883	23	4	9	—	801	59	0	4.42	.863

"Melanson's stats". The Goaltender Home Page.

== Notes ==
Preceded by Rick Wamsley and Denis Herron	Winner of the William M. Jennings Trophy (with Billy Smith); 1983	Succeeded by Al Jensen and Pat Riggin
