= 1982–83 New Jersey Devils season =

National Hockey League season

1982–83 New Jersey Devils
- Division: 5th Patrick
- Conference: 9th Wales
- 1982–83 record: 17–49–14
- Home record: 11–20–9
- Road record: 6–29–5
- Goals for: 230
- Goals against: 338

Team information
- General manager: Bill MacMillan
- Coach: Bill MacMillan
- Captain: Don Lever
- Alternate captains: None
- Arena: Brendan Byrne Arena

Team leaders
- Goals: Steve Tambellini (25)
- Assists: Tapio Levo (40)
- Points: Aaron Broten (55)
- Penalty minutes: Yvon Vautour (136)
- Wins: Chico Resch (15)
- Goals against average: Chico Resch (3.98)

The 1982–83 New Jersey Devils season was the franchise's ninth season in the NHL and the first in New Jersey after moving from Colorado, where they were known as the Colorado Rockies. The Devils first ever game was a 3–3 tie with the Pittsburgh Penguins, where first captain Don Lever scored the Devils' first ever goal. The team's first win would come against their new rivals, the New York Rangers. However, the new location didn't help the team overall, as they continued to struggle in the standings, finishing second-last in their division and third-to-last in their conference.

== Regular season ==
=== Season standings ===
Patrick Division
	GP	W	L	T	GF	GA	Pts
**Philadelphia Flyers**	80	49	23	8	326	240	106
**New York Islanders**	80	42	26	12	302	226	96
**Washington Capitals**	80	39	25	16	306	283	94
**New York Rangers**	80	35	35	10	306	287	80
New Jersey Devils	80	17	49	14	230	338	48
Pittsburgh Penguins	80	18	53	9	250	394	45

Note: GP = Games played, W = Wins, L = Losses, T = Ties, Pts = Points, GF = Goals for, GA = Goals against
Note: Teams that qualified for the playoffs are highlighted in bold.

=== Record vs. opponents ===
Patrick Division record vs. opponents

==== Vs. Wales Conference ====
**Vs. Patrick Division**

1982–83 NHL records
Team	**NJD**	**NYI**	**NYR**	**PHI**	**PIT**	**WSH**	**Total**
New Jersey	—	0−7	3−3−1	2−5	3−1−3	0−6−1	8−22−5
N.Y. Islanders	7−0	—	4−3	1−4−2	5−2	4−2−1	21−11−3
N.Y. Rangers	3−3−1	3−4	—	3−4	5−1−1	3−3−1	17−15−3
Philadelphia	5−2	4−1−2	4−3	—	5−1−1	3−4	21−11−3
Pittsburgh	1−3−3	2−5	1−5−1	1–5–1	—	1−5−1	6−23−6
Washington	6−0−1	2−4−1	3−3−1	4–3	5–1–1	—	20−11−4

**Vs. Adams Division**

1982–83 NHL records
Team	**BOS**	**BUF**	**HFD**	**MTL**	**QUE**	**Total**
New Jersey	0−1−2	0−2−1	1−2	1−2	1−2	3−9−3
N.Y. Islanders	0−2−1	1−2	2−1	1−0−2	1−1−1	5−6−4
N.Y. Rangers	0−3	0−2−1	2−1	1−2	1−2	4−10−1
Philadelphia	0−2−1	1−2	2−1	1−2	3−0	7−7−1
Pittsburgh	1−2	1−1−1	3−0	1−2	0−3	6−8−1
Washington	3−0	0−3	2−0−1	0−1−2	1−1−1	6−5−4

==== Vs. Campbell Conference ====
**Vs. Norris Division**

1982–83 NHL records
Team	**CHI**	**DET**	**MIN**	**STL**	**TOR**	**Total**
New Jersey	0−3	1−1−1	0−3	0−2−1	1−0−2	2−9−4
N.Y. Islanders	1−1−1	0−2−1	0−2−1	2−1	2−1	5−7−3
N.Y. Rangers	0−3	2−0−1	2−1	2−0−1	3−0	9−4−2
Philadelphia	1−1−1	3−0	1−1−1	3−0	2−0−1	10−2−3
Pittsburgh	0−3	0−2−1	0−2−1	0−3	1−2	1−12−2
Washington	2−0−1	2−1	1−1−1	1−1−1	2−1	8−4−3

**Vs. Smythe Division**

1982–83 NHL records
Team	**CGY**	**EDM**	**LAK**	**VAN**	**WIN**	**Total**
New Jersey	1−2	0−3	1−2	1−0−2	1−2	4−9−2
N.Y. Islanders	2−0−1	3−0	3−0	2−1	1−1−1	11−2−2
N.Y. Rangers	2−0−1	0−3	1−1−1	1−1−1	1−1−1	5−6−4
Philadelphia	3−0	2−1	2−1	1−1−1	3−0	11−3−1
Pittsburgh	0−3	1−2	2−1	1−2	1−2	5−10−0
Washington	2−1	0−2−1	1−1−1	1−1−1	1−0−2	5−5−5

== Schedule and results ==
1982–83 regular season
October: 3–6–3 (home: 2–3–2; road: 1–3–1)

Game	Date	Visitor	Score	Home	Record	Points	Attendance
1	October 5	Pittsburgh	3 – 3	New Jersey	0–0–1	1	13,663
2	October 8	NY Rangers	2 – 3	New Jersey	1–0–1	3	19,203
3	October 9	New Jersey	5 – 5	Toronto	1–0–2	4	16,382
4	October 12	Boston	2 – 2	New Jersey	1–0–3	5	10,251
5	October 14	Montreal	5 – 3	New Jersey	1–1–3	5	11,703
6	October 16	New Jersey	6 – 5	Pittsburgh	2–1–3	7	8,852
7	October 18	Philadelphia	1 – 3	New Jersey	3–1–3	9	12,521
8	October 20	New Jersey	4 – 7	Los Angeles	3–2–3	9	8,519
9	October 22	New Jersey	1 – 3	Winnipeg	3–3–3	9	12,534
10	October 26	Minnesota	5 – 3	New Jersey	3–4–3	9	11,208
11	October 28	NY Islanders	4 – 2	New Jersey	3–5–3	9	19,023
12	October 30	New Jersey	5 – 8	NY Islanders	3–6–3	9	15,230

November: 1–10–4 (home: 0–3–2; road: 1–7–2)

Game	Date	Visitor	Score	Home	Record	Points	Attendance
13	November 1	Calgary	6 – 3	New Jersey	3–7–3	9	10,152
14	November 2	New Jersey	4 – 5	Montreal	3–8–3	9	15,177
15	November 4	Pittsburgh	4 – 4	New Jersey	3–8–4	10	10,410
16	November 6	New Jersey	1 – 1	Detroit	3–8–5	11	11,395
17	November 8	Washington	2 – 2	New Jersey	3–8–6	12	10,273
18	November 10	New Jersey	0 – 3	Washington	3–9–6	12	12,445
19	November 11	Edmonton	5 – 1	New Jersey	3–10–6	12	19,023
20	November 13	New Jersey	2 – 7	Quebec	3–11–6	12	15,004
21	November 16	New Jersey	2 – 7	St. Louis	3–12–6	12	10,807
22	November 17	New Jersey	3 – 5	Chicago	3–13–6	12	14,628
23	November 20	New Jersey	1 – 5	Minnesota	3–14–6	12	14,940
24	November 24	New Jersey	0 – 3	Los Angeles	3–15–6	12	9,735
25	November 26	New Jersey	4 – 4	Vancouver	3–15–7	13	12,875
26	November 27	New Jersey	4 – 3	Calgary	4–15–7	15	7,242
27	November 29	Chicago	3 – 1	New Jersey	4–16–7	15	10,834

December: 3–9–0 (home: 2–4–0; road: 1–5–0)

Game	Date	Visitor	Score	Home	Record	Points	Attendance
28	December 1	Toronto	3 – 7	New Jersey	5–16–7	17	9,007
29	December 3	Hartford	4 – 5	New Jersey	6–16–7	19	12,428
30	December 4	New Jersey	2 – 6	Detroit	6–17–7	19	8,462
31	December 6	Winnipeg	5 – 3	New Jersey	6–18–7	19	8,862
32	December 9	Washington	6 – 4	New Jersey	6–19–7	19	9,123
33	December 11	New Jersey	1 – 7	NY Islanders	6–20–7	19	15,167
34	December 12	New Jersey	0 – 4	NY Rangers	6–21–7	19	17,423
35	December 17	New Jersey	4 – 10	Edmonton	6–22–7	19	17,498
36	December 19	New Jersey	3 – 2	Winnipeg	7–22–7	21	10,815
37	December 22	Philadelphia	3 – 1	New Jersey	7–23–7	21	13,144
38	December 26	New Jersey	2 – 5	Boston	7–24–7	21	14,685
39	December 30	NY Rangers	5 – 2	New Jersey	7–25–7	21	19,023

January: 4–6–4 (home: 4–1–3; road: 0–5–1)

Game	Date	Visitor	Score	Home	Record	Points	Attendance
40	January 2	Vancouver	1 – 3	New Jersey	8–25–7	23	10,017
41	January 5	Toronto	4 – 4	New Jersey	8–25–8	24	9,330
42	January 7	Boston	2 – 2	New Jersey	8–25–9	25	19,023
43	January 9	New Jersey	3 – 4	NY Rangers	8–26–9	25	17,422
44	January 10	Quebec	2 – 6	New Jersey	9–26–9	27	9,814
45	January 13	NY Islanders	5 – 2	New Jersey	9–27–9	27	17,342
46	January 15	New Jersey	1 – 2	Hartford	9–28–9	27	9,200
47	January 16	Los Angeles	3 – 5	New Jersey	10–28–9	29	10,367
48	January 19	New Jersey	1 – 1	Pittsburgh	10–28–10	30	5,213
49	January 20	St. Louis	3 – 3	New Jersey	10–28–11	31	9,763
50	January 23	New Jersey	1 – 3	Washington	10–29–11	31	8,839
51	January 25	New Jersey	1 – 5	Philadelphia	10–30–11	31	16,312
52	January 29	New Jersey	4 – 6	Quebec	10–31–11	31	15,056
53	January 31	Pittsburgh	2 – 3	New Jersey	11–31–11	33	9,732

February: 1–8–2 (home: 1–2–2; road: 0–6–0)

Game	Date	Visitor	Score	Home	Record	Points	Attendance
54	February 3	NY Islanders	7 – 2	New Jersey	11–32–11	33	15,033
55	February 5	New Jersey	4 – 5	Washington	11–33–11	33	13,150
56	February 6	Vancouver	4 – 4	New Jersey	11–33–12	34	7,036
57	February 9	New Jersey	4 – 5	Chicago	11–34–12	34	16,235
58	February 12	New Jersey	1 – 5	St. Louis	11–35–12	34	11,948
59	February 15	Minnesota	3 – 2	New Jersey	11–36–12	34	10,765
60	February 20	New Jersey	0 – 3	Philadelphia	11–37–12	34	17,011
61	February 21	Buffalo	4 – 4	New Jersey	11–37–13	35	10,060
62	February 24	Detroit	1 – 4	New Jersey	12–37–13	37	11,242
63	February 26	New Jersey	4 – 5	Pittsburgh	12–38–13	37	10,343
64	February 27	New Jersey	2 – 6	Buffalo	12–39–13	37	11,916

March: 4–10–0 (home: 2–7–0; road: 2–3–0)

Game	Date	Visitor	Score	Home	Record	Points	Attendance
65	March 1	Edmonton	4 – 3	New Jersey	12–40–13	37	13,478
66	March 3	Philadelphia	4 – 1	New Jersey	12–41–13	37	12,701
67	March 5	New Jersey	1 – 5	NY Islanders	12–42–13	37	15,230
68	March 6	New Jersey	6 – 4	NY Rangers	13–42–13	39	17,410
69	March 8	Washington	5 – 4	New Jersey	13–43–13	39	9,350
70	March 10	Hartford	3 – 0	New Jersey	13–44–13	39	10,206
71	March 12	New Jersey	7 – 3	Montreal	14–44–13	41	16,556
72	March 14	Calgary	7 – 0	New Jersey	14–45–13	41	10,563
73	March 17	NY Islanders	9 – 5	New Jersey	14–46–13	41	13,954
74	March 21	NY Rangers	2 – 4	New Jersey	15–46–13	43	19,023
75	March 24	New Jersey	3 – 5	Washington	15–47–13	43	9,713
76	March 25	Philadelphia	5 – 6	New Jersey	16–47–13	45	17,041
77	March 27	New Jersey	1 – 4	Philadelphia	16–48–13	45	16,922
78	March 31	Buffalo	8 – 5	New Jersey	16–49–13	45	13,286

April: 1–0–1 (home: 0–0–0; road: 1–0–1)

Game	Date	Visitor	Score	Home	Record	Points	Attendance
79	April 1	New Jersey	3 – 3	NY Rangers	16–49–14	46	17,412
80	April 3	New Jersey	5 – 3	Pittsburgh	17–49–14	48	5,864

Legend: Win (2 points) Loss (0 points) Tie (1 point)

== Player statistics ==
=== Skaters ===
Note: GP = Games played; G = Goals; A = Assists; Pts = Points; PIM = Penalty minutes

	Regular season					Playoffs
Player	GP	G	A	Pts	PIM	GP	G	A	Pts	PIM
Aaron Broten	73	16	39	55	28	–	–	–	–	-
Don Lever	79	23	30	53	68	–	–	–	–	-
Bob MacMillan	71	19	29	48	8	–	–	–	–	-
Tapio Levo	73	7	40	47	22	–	–	–	–	-
Jeff Larmer	65	21	24	45	21	–	–	–	–	-
Hector Marini	77	17	28	45	105	–	–	–	–	-
Steve Tambellini	73	25	18	43	14	–	–	–	–	-
Brent Ashton	76	14	19	33	47	–	–	–	–	-
Rick Meagher^{†}	57	15	14	29	11	–	–	–	–	-
Paul Gagne	53	14	15	29	13	–	–	–	–	-
Murray Brumwell	59	5	14	19	34	–	–	–	–	-
Jan Ludvig	51	7	10	17	30	–	–	–	–	-
Joel Quenneville	74	5	12	17	46	–	–	–	–	-
Mike Antonovich	30	7	7	14	11	–	–	–	–	-
Glenn Merkosky	34	4	10	14	20	–	–	–	–	-
Bob Lorimer	66	3	10	13	42	–	–	–	–	-
Mike Kitchen	77	4	8	12	52	–	–	–	–	-
Yvon Vautour	52	4	7	11	136	–	–	–	–	-
Rob Palmer	60	1	10	11	21	–	–	–	–	-
Dave Cameron	35	5	4	9	50	–	–	–	–	-
John Wensink	42	2	7	9	135	–	–	–	–	-
Carol Vadnais	51	2	7	9	64	–	–	–	–	-
Merlin Malinowski^{‡}	5	3	2	5	0	–	–	–	–	-
Pat Verbeek	6	3	2	5	8	–	–	–	–	-
Dave Hutchison	32	1	4	5	102	–	–	–	–	-
Garry Howatt	38	1	4	5	114	–	–	–	–	-
Jukka Porvari	8	1	3	4	4	–	–	–	–	-
Chico Resch	65	0	3	3	6	–	–	–	–	-
Larry Floyd	5	1	0	1	2	–	–	–	–	-
Joe Cirella	2	0	1	1	4	–	–	–	–	-
Mike Moher	9	0	1	1	28	–	–	–	–	-
Ron Low^{†}	11	0	1	1	0	–	–	–	–	-
Randy Pierce	3	0	0	0	0	–	–	–	–	-
Dwight Foster^{‡}	4	0	0	0	2	–	–	–	–	-
Shawn MacKenzie	6	0	0	0	0	–	–	–	–	-
Lindsay Middlebrook^{‡}	9	0	0	0	2	–	–	–	–	-

^{†}Denotes player spent time with another team before joining New Jersey. Stats reflect time with the Devils only.
^{‡}Traded mid-season

Note: GP = Games played; TOI = Time on ice (minutes); W = Wins; L = Losses; OT = Overtime/shootout losses; GA = Goals against; SO = Shutouts; GAA = Goals against average

	Regular season								Playoffs
Player	GP	TOI	W	L	T	GA	SO	GAA	GP	TOI	W	L	GA	SO	GAA
Chico Resch	65	3650	15	35	12	242	0	3.98	–	–	–	–	–	–	-
Ron Low^{†}	11	608	2	7	1	41	0	4.05	–	–	–	–	–	–	-
Lindsay Middlebrook^{‡}	9	412	0	6	1	37	0	5.39	–	–	–	–	–	–	-
Shawn MacKenzie	6	130	0	1	0	15	0	6.92	–	–	–	–	–	–	-

^{†}Denotes player spent time with another team before joining New Jersey. Stats reflect time with the Devils only.
^{‡}Traded mid-season
Bold/italics denotes franchise record

== Transactions ==
The Devils were involved in the following transactions during the 1982–83 season.

=== Trades ===
October 1, 1982	To New Jersey Devils Hector Marini; 4th round pick in 1983	To New York Islanders 4th round pick in 1983
October 15, 1982	To New Jersey Devils Rick Meagher; Garry Howatt	To Hartford Whalers Merlin Malinowski; Scott Fusco
October 29, 1982	To New Jersey Devils Cash	To Detroit Red Wings Dwight Foster
February 19, 1983	To New Jersey Devils Ron Low	To Edmonton Oilers Lindsay Middlebrook; Paul Miller

=== Free agents ===
Player	Former team
C Mike Antonovich	Minnesota North Stars
C Mitch Wilson	Seattle Breakers (WHL)
F Jan Ludvig	Edmonton Oilers

Player	New team

== Draft picks ==
The Devils' draft picks at the 1982 NHL entry draft at the Montreal Forum in Montreal, Canada.

Rd #	Pick #	Player	Nat	Pos	Team (League)	Notes
1	8	Rocky Trottier	Canada	C	Billings Bighorns (WHL)	(Note: The Colorado Rockies traded Rob Ramage to St. Louis in exchange for St. Louis' first-round picks in 1982 (Trottier) and 1983 (McLean) on June 9, 1982.)
1	18	Ken Daneyko	Canada	D	Seattle Breakers (WHL)	(Note: Colorado traded away the 1982 first overall pick (used on Gord Kluzak) and second-round pick (used on Brian Curran) to Boston for Dwight Foster and the Bruins' 1982 first-round pick (Daneyko) and tenth-round pick (Gilliard) on July 2, 1981.)
2	22	No second-round draft pick				
3	44	Pat Verbeek	Canada	C	Sudbury Wolves (OHL)	
3	54	Dave Kasper	Canada	C	Sherbrooke Castors (QMJHL)	(Note: Colorado had acquired Winnipeg's 1982 third-round pick along with Brent Ashton for Lucien DeBlois on July 15, 1981.)
4	64	No fourth-round draft pick				(Note: Colorado traded their 1982 fourth-round pick to Los Angeles (used to draft Dave Gans) for Nick Beverley on November 18, 1978.)
5	85	Scott Brydges	United States	D	White Bear Lake Mariner H.S. (Minnesota)	
6	106	Mike Moher	Canada	RW	Kitchener Rangers (OHL)	
7	127	Paul Fulcher	Canada	LW	London Knights (OHL)	
8	148	John Hutchings	Canada	D	Oshawa Generals (OHL)	
9	169	Alan Hepple	United Kingdom	D	Ottawa 67's (OHL)	
10	190	Brent Shaw	Canada	RW	Seattle Breakers (WHL)	
10	207	Tony Gilliard	Canada	LW	Niagara Falls Flyers (OHL)	
11	211	Scott Fusco	United States	C	Harvard University (ECAC)	
12	232	Dan Dorion	United States	RW	Austin Mavericks (USHL)	

== See also ==
- 1982–83 NHL season
