= 1982–83 New York Rangers season =

NHL hockey team season

1982–83 New York Rangers
- Division: 4th Patrick
- Conference: T-7th Wales
- 1982–83 record: 35–35–10
- Home record: 24–13–3
- Road record: 11–22–7
- Goals for: 306
- Goals against: 287

Team information
- General manager: Craig Patrick
- Coach: Herb Brooks
- Captain: Barry Beck
- Alternate captains: None
- Arena: Madison Square Garden

Team leaders
- Goals: Mark Pavelich (37)
- Assists: Reijo Ruotsalainen (53)
- Points: Mike Rogers (76)
- Penalty minutes: Dave Maloney (132)
- Wins: Eddie Mio (16)
- Goals against average: John Davidson (2.50)

The 1982–83 New York Rangers season was the franchise's 57th season. During the regular season, New York compiled a 35–35–10 record and finished in fourth place in the Patrick Division. The Rangers qualified for the NHL playoffs, where they defeated the Philadelphia Flyers in a three-game sweep in the first round. In the Patrick Division Finals, the Rangers were defeated by the New York Islanders in six games.

== Regular season ==
=== Final standings ===
Patrick Division
	GP	W	L	T	GF	GA	Pts
**Philadelphia Flyers**	80	49	23	8	326	240	106
**New York Islanders**	80	42	26	12	302	226	96
**Washington Capitals**	80	39	25	16	306	283	94
**New York Rangers**	80	35	35	10	306	287	80
New Jersey Devils	80	17	49	14	230	338	48
Pittsburgh Penguins	80	18	53	9	250	394	45

Note: GP = Games played, W = Wins, L = Losses, T = Ties, Pts = Points, GF = Goals for, GA = Goals against
Note: Teams that qualified for the playoffs are highlighted in bold.

=== Record vs. opponents ===
Patrick Division record vs. opponents

==== Vs. Wales Conference ====
**Vs. Patrick Division**

1982–83 NHL records
Team	**NJD**	**NYI**	**NYR**	**PHI**	**PIT**	**WSH**	**Total**
New Jersey	—	0−7	3−3−1	2−5	3−1−3	0−6−1	8−22−5
N.Y. Islanders	7−0	—	4−3	1−4−2	5−2	4−2−1	21−11−3
N.Y. Rangers	3−3−1	3−4	—	3−4	5−1−1	3−3−1	17−15−3
Philadelphia	5−2	4−1−2	4−3	—	5−1−1	3−4	21−11−3
Pittsburgh	1−3−3	2−5	1−5−1	1–5–1	—	1−5−1	6−23−6
Washington	6−0−1	2−4−1	3−3−1	4–3	5–1–1	—	20−11−4

**Vs. Adams Division**

1982–83 NHL records
Team	**BOS**	**BUF**	**HFD**	**MTL**	**QUE**	**Total**
New Jersey	0−1−2	0−2−1	1−2	1−2	1−2	3−9−3
N.Y. Islanders	0−2−1	1−2	2−1	1−0−2	1−1−1	5−6−4
N.Y. Rangers	0−3	0−2−1	2−1	1−2	1−2	4−10−1
Philadelphia	0−2−1	1−2	2−1	1−2	3−0	7−7−1
Pittsburgh	1−2	1−1−1	3−0	1−2	0−3	6−8−1
Washington	3−0	0−3	2−0−1	0−1−2	1−1−1	6−5−4

==== Vs. Campbell Conference ====
**Vs. Norris Division**

1982–83 NHL records
Team	**CHI**	**DET**	**MIN**	**STL**	**TOR**	**Total**
New Jersey	0−3	1−1−1	0−3	0−2−1	1−0−2	2−9−4
N.Y. Islanders	1−1−1	0−2−1	0−2−1	2−1	2−1	5−7−3
N.Y. Rangers	0−3	2−0−1	2−1	2−0−1	3−0	9−4−2
Philadelphia	1−1−1	3−0	1−1−1	3−0	2−0−1	10−2−3
Pittsburgh	0−3	0−2−1	0−2−1	0−3	1−2	1−12−2
Washington	2−0−1	2−1	1−1−1	1−1−1	2−1	8−4−3

**Vs. Smythe Division**

1982–83 NHL records
Team	**CGY**	**EDM**	**LAK**	**VAN**	**WIN**	**Total**
New Jersey	1−2	0−3	1−2	1−0−2	1−2	4−9−2
N.Y. Islanders	2−0−1	3−0	3−0	2−1	1−1−1	11−2−2
N.Y. Rangers	2−0−1	0−3	1−1−1	1−1−1	1−1−1	5−6−4
Philadelphia	3−0	2−1	2−1	1−1−1	3−0	11−3−1
Pittsburgh	0−3	1−2	2−1	1−2	1−2	5−10−0
Washington	2−1	0−2−1	1−1−1	1−1−1	1−0−2	5−5−5

== Schedule and results ==
1982–83 regular season
October: 6–7–0 (home: 5–3–0; road: 1–4–0)

Game	October	Opponent	Score	Record
1	6	Washington Capitals	5–4	0–1–0
2	8	@ New Jersey Devils	3–2	0–2–0
3	9	@ Pittsburgh Penguins	5–3	1–2–0
4	11	New York Islanders	4–3	1–3–0
5	13	Philadelphia Flyers	5–2	2–3–0
6	16	@ Montreal Canadiens	8–2	2–4–0
7	17	Los Angeles Kings	5–3	2–5–0
8	20	Vancouver Canucks	6–5	3–5–0
9	23	@ New York Islanders	5–2	3–6–0
10	24	Minnesota North Stars	4–2	4–6–0
11	27	Calgary Flames	7–4	5–6–0
12	30	@ Quebec Nordiques	5–4	5–7–0
13	31	Pittsburgh Penguins	6–2	6–7–0

November: 6–4–1 (home: 4–1–0; road: 2–3–1)

Game	November	Opponent	Score	Record
14	5	@ Edmonton Oilers	5–1	6–8–0
15	6	@ Calgary Flames	2–2	6–8–1
16	10	St. Louis Blues	5–4	7–8–1
17	11	@ Philadelphia Flyers	7–3	7–9–1
18	14	Edmonton Oilers	7–2	7–10–1
19	17	Toronto Maple Leafs	6–1	8–10–1
20	20	@ Toronto Maple Leafs	6–3	9–10–1
21	21	New York Islanders	7–3	10–10–1
22	24	Minnesota North Stars	8–5	11–10–1
23	27	@ New York Islanders	3–0	12–10–1
24	28	@ Buffalo Sabres	7–3	12–11–1

December: 6–5–2 (home: 5–2–0; road: 1–3–2)

Game	December	Opponent	Score	Record
25	1	Hartford Whalers	6–1	13–11–1
26	4	@ Hartford Whalers	5–2	13–12–1
27	5	Toronto Maple Leafs	6–5	14–12–1
28	8	@ Chicago Black Hawks	7–2	14–13–1
29	10	@ Washington Capitals	4–4	14–13–2
30	12	New Jersey Devils	4–0	15–13–2
31	15	Los Angeles Kings	7–1	16–13–2
32	17	New York Islanders	5–2	16–14–2
33	18	@ Detroit Red Wings	3–3	16–14–3
34	20	Pittsburgh Penguins	6–3	17–14–3
35	22	Buffalo Sabres	3–1	17–15–3
36	26	@ Pittsburgh Penguins	4–3	17–16–3
37	30	@ New Jersey Devils	5–2	18–16–3

January: 5–7–3 (home: 3–4–2; road: 2–3–1)

Game	January	Opponent	Score	Record
38	1	@ Washington Capitals	7–2	19–16–3
39	3	Detroit Red Wings	6–2	20–16–3
40	5	Buffalo Sabres	3–3	20–16–4
41	7	Quebec Nordiques	5–1	21–16–4
42	9	New Jersey Devils	4–3	22–16–4
43	12	Winnipeg Jets	5–5	22–16–5
44	15	@ Boston Bruins	2–0	22–17–5
45	16	Philadelphia Flyers	4–0	22–18–5
46	18	@ Vancouver Canucks	3–3	22–18–6
47	21	@ Winnipeg Jets	4–1	22–19–6
48	23	@ Philadelphia Flyers	3–1	22–20–6
49	24	Boston Bruins	3–1	22–21–6
50	27	Montreal Canadiens	4–1	22–22–6
51	29	@ Pittsburgh Penguins	2–1	23–22–6
52	30	Chicago Black Hawks	5–4	23–23–6

February: 5–4–2 (home: 4–0–0; road: 1–4–2)

Game	February	Opponent	Score	Record
53	1	@ Los Angeles Kings	5–5	23–23–7
54	5	@ St. Louis Blues	2–2	23–23–8
55	6	@ Chicago Black Hawks	4–1	23–24–8
56	10	@ Minnesota North Stars	7–5	23–25–8
57	12	@ Montreal Canadiens	3–2	24–25–8
58	16	Washington Capitals	5–4	25–25–8
59	19	@ Philadelphia Flyers	8–5	25–26–8
60	20	Winnipeg Jets	9–4	26–26–8
61	23	Hartford Whalers	11–3	27–26–8
62	26	@ Quebec Nordiques	6–3	27–27–8
63	28	Pittsburgh Penguins	9–3	28–27–8

March: 7–7–1 (home: 3–3–0; road: 4–4–1)

Game	March	Opponent	Score	Record
64	1	@ Pittsburgh Penguins	3–3	28–27–9
65	3	Washington Capitals	4–3	28–28–9
66	6	New Jersey Devils	6–4	28–29–9
67	8	@ Vancouver Canucks	7–3	28–30–9
68	11	@ Edmonton Oilers	3–1	28–31–9
69	12	@ Calgary Flames	4–1	29–31–9
70	14	Philadelphia Flyers	8–2	30–31–9
71	16	New York Islanders	2–1	31–31–9
72	20	Boston Bruins	4–0	31–32–9
73	21	@ New Jersey Devils	4–2	31–33–9
74	23	@ Detroit Red Wings	7–1	32–33–9
75	26	@ New York Islanders	3–2	32–34–9
76	27	Washington Capitals	5–4	33–34–9
77	29	@ St. Louis Blues	4–3	34–34–9
78	31	@ Philadelphia Flyers	4–2	35–34–9

April: 0–1–1 (home: 0–0–1; road: 0–1–0)

Game	April	Opponent	Score	Record
79	1	New Jersey Devils	3–3	35–34–10
80	3	@ Washington Capitals	3–0	35–35–10

Legend: Win (2 points) Loss (0 points) Tie (1 point)

== Playoffs ==
1983 Stanley Cup playoffs
Division semifinals vs. (P1) Philadelphia Flyers – Rangers win 3–0

Game	Date	Visitor	Score	Home	OT	Series
1	April 5	New York Rangers	5–3	Philadelphia Flyers		New York Rangers lead series 1–0
2	April 7	New York Rangers	4–3	Philadelphia Flyers		New York Rangers lead series 2–0
3	April 9	Philadelphia Flyers	3–9	New York Rangers		New York Rangers win series 3–0

Division Finals vs. (P2) New York Islanders – Islanders win 4–2

Game	Date	Visitor	Score	Home	OT	Series
1	April 14	New York Rangers	1–4	New York Islanders		New York Islanders lead series 1–0
2	April 15	New York Rangers	0–5	New York Islanders		New York Islanders lead series 2–0
3	April 17	New York Islanders	6–7	New York Rangers		New York Islanders lead series 2–1
4	April 18	New York Islanders	1–3	New York Rangers		Series tied 2–2
5	April 20	New York Rangers	2–7	New York Islanders		New York Islanders lead series 3–2
6	April 22	New York Islanders	5–2	New York Rangers		New York Islanders win series 4–2

Legend: Win Loss

== Player statistics ==
Skaters

Regular season
Player	GP	G	A	Pts	+/-	PIM
Mike Rogers	71	29	47	76	−10	28
Mark Pavelich	78	37	38	75	20	52
Don Maloney	78	29	40	69	−5	88
Reijo Ruotsalainen	77	16	53	69	27	22
Anders Hedberg	78	25	34	59	17	12
Mikko Leinonen	78	17	34	51	12	23
Dave Maloney	78	8	42	50	−3	132
Rob McClanahan	78	22	26	48	12	46
Ron Duguay	72	19	25	44	−13	58
Ed Johnstone	52	15	21	36	−4	27
Barry Beck	66	12	22	34	22	112
Robbie Ftorek	61	12	19	31	11	41
Kent-Erik Andersson	71	8	20	28	6	14
Nick Fotiu	72	8	13	21	6	90
Vaclav Nedomansky^{†}	35	12	8	20	−1	0
Mike Allison	39	11	9	20	8	37
Bill Baker	70	4	14	18	−8	64
Chris Kontos	44	8	7	15	1	33
Andre Dore^{‡}	39	3	12	15	17	39
Scot Kleinendorst	30	2	9	11	7	8
Tom Laidlaw	80	0	10	10	−11	75
Ron Greschner	10	3	5	8	0	0
Ulf Nilsson	10	2	4	6	−1	2
Rick Chartraw^{†}	26	2	2	4	2	37
Mike Backman	7	1	3	4	−5	6
Dave Silk	16	1	1	2	−3	15
Pat Conacher	5	0	1	1	0	4
Cam Connor	1	0	0	0	0	0
Graeme Nicolson	10	0	0	0	−5	9

Playoffs
Player	GP	G	A	Pts	PIM
Anders Hedberg	9	4	8	12	4
Mark Pavelich	9	4	5	9	12
Rob McClanahan	9	2	5	7	12
Dave Maloney	7	1	6	7	10
George McPhee	9	3	3	6	6
Barry Beck	9	2	4	6	8
Reijo Ruotsalainen	9	4	2	6	6
Mike Allison	8	0	5	5	10
Ed Johnstone	9	4	1	5	19
Mike Backman	9	2	2	4	0
Ron Greschner	8	2	2	4	12
Ron Duguay	9	2	2	4	28
Mikko Leinonen	7	1	3	4	4
Rick Chartraw	9	0	2	2	6
Tom Laidlaw	9	1	1	2	10
Scot Kleinendorst	6	0	2	2	2
Nick Fotiu	5	0	1	1	6
Robbie Ftorek	4	1	0	1	0
Don Maloney	5	0	1	1	0
Pat Conacher	1	0	0	0	0
Bill Baker	2	0	0	0	0
Kent-Erik Andersson	9	0	0	0	0
Mike Rogers	1	0	0	0	0

Goaltenders

Regular season
Player	GP	TOI	W	L	T	GA	GAA	SA	SV%	SO
Eddie Mio	41	2365	16	18	6	136	3.45	1295	.883	2
Glen Hanlon^{†}	21	1173	9	10	1	67	3.43	702	.894	0
Steve Weeks	18	1040	9	5	3	68	3.92	559	.862	0
Steve Baker	3	102	0	1	0	5	2.94	49	.886	0
John Davidson	2	120	1	1	0	5	2.50	60	.909	0

Playoffs
Player	GP	TOI	W	L	GA	GAA	SO
Eddie Mio	8	480	5	3	32	4.00	0
Glen Hanlon	1	60	0	1	5	5.00	0

^{†}Denotes player spent time with another team before joining Rangers. Stats reflect time with Rangers only.
^{‡}Traded mid-season. Stats reflect time with Rangers only.

Note:

Pos = Position;GP = Games played; G = Goals; A = Assists; Pts = Points; PIM = Penalty minutes; +/- = Plus/minus; PPG = Power-play goals; SHG = Short-handed goals; GWG = Game-winning goals
Pos = Position;GP = Games played; Min, TOI = Minutes played; W = Wins; L = Losses; T,T/OT = Ties; OTL = Overtime losses; GA = Goals-against; GAA = Goals-against average; SO = Shutouts; SA = Shots against; SV = Shots saved;SV% = Save percentage;

== Draft picks ==
New York's picks at the 1982 NHL entry draft in Montreal, Canada at the Montreal Forum.

Round	#	Player	Position	Nationality	College/Junior/Club team (League)
1	15	Chris Kontos	C	Canada	Toronto Marlboros (OHL)
2	36	Tomas Sandstrom	RW	Sweden	Farjestad BK (Elitserien)
3	57	Corey Millen	C	United States	Cloquet H.S. (Minnesota)
4	78	Chris Jensen	RW	Canada	Kelowna Buckaroos (BCJHL)
6	120	Tony Granato	C	United States	Northwood H.S. (New York)
7	141	Sergei Kapustin	LW	Soviet Union	Moscow Spartak (Russia)
8	160	Brian Glynn	C	United States	Buffalo Jr. Sabres (NAJHL)
8	162	Janne Karlsson	D	Sweden	IFK Kiruna (Sweden)
9	183	Kelly Miller	LW	United States	Michigan State University (NCAA)
10	193	Simo Saarinen	D	Finland	HIFK (FNL)
10	204	Bob Lowes	C	Canada	Prince Albert Raiders (SJHL)
11	225	Andy Otto	D	United States	Northwood H.S. (New York)
12	246	Dwayne Robinson	D	Canada	University of New Hampshire (NCAA)

== See also ==
- 1982–83 NHL season
