= 1982–83 NHL season =

National Hockey League season

- League: National Hockey League
- Sport: Ice hockey
- Duration: October 5, 1982 – May 17, 1983
- Games: 80
- Teams: 21
- TV partner(s): CBC, SRC (Canada); USA (United States)

Draft
- Top draft pick: Gord Kluzak
- Picked by: Boston Bruins

Regular season
- Season champions: Boston Bruins
- Season MVP: Wayne Gretzky (Oilers)
- Top scorer: Wayne Gretzky (Oilers)

Playoffs
- Playoffs MVP: Billy Smith (Islanders)

Stanley Cup
- Champions: New York Islanders
- Runners-up: Edmonton Oilers

NHL seasons
- 1981–82 1983–84

The 1982–83 NHL season was the 66th season of the National Hockey League. The Colorado Rockies relocated to East Rutherford, New Jersey, becoming the New Jersey Devils. The New York Islanders won their fourth Stanley Cup in a row with their second consecutive Cup Final sweep by beating the Edmonton Oilers four games to none. It remains to date the last time that any major professional North American sports team has won four consecutive playoff championships.

== League business ==
=== Franchise relocation ===
Prior the start of the season, the Colorado Rockies moved to East Rutherford, New Jersey where they were renamed New Jersey Devils, leaving Denver without an NHL franchise until 1995. They were also moved to the Patrick Division, forcing the reluctant Winnipeg Jets to leave the Norris Division and take Colorado's place in the Smythe Division. This would be the last relocation of an NHL team until 1993, and the last time a team would be transferred to a new division until 1993. The period between this move and the adding of the expansion San Jose Sharks in 1991 is the second-longest period of stability in league history, surpassed only by the Original Six era. After the season, the St. Louis Blues were sold to Harry Ornest after the NHL prevented Wild Bill Hunter from purchasing that team and moving it to Saskatoon.

=== Entry draft ===
The 1982 NHL entry draft was held on June 9, at the Montreal Forum in Montreal, Quebec. Gord Kluzak was selected first overall by the Boston Bruins.

== Uniforms ==
At the end of the season, the long pants worn by the Philadelphia Flyers and Hartford Whalers were banned, due to player safety concerns.

== Arenas ==
- The Calgary Flames played their final season at the Stampede Corral before moving into the Olympic Saddledome.
- The name of the Minnesota North Stars' home arena was shortened from the Metropolitan Sports Center to the Met Center.
- The relocated New Jersey Devils moved from McNichols Sports Arena in Denver, Colorado to Brendan Byrne Arena in East Rutherford, New Jersey.

== Regular season ==
The last remaining players from the Original Six era (prior to the Expansion Era)–Carol Vadnais, Serge Savard and Wayne Cashman–all retired after this season. Cashman was the last to play, losing in the Wales Conference Finals as a member of the Bruins.

The Boston Bruins led the league in overall points with 110. The defending Stanley Cup champion New York Islanders fell from first overall and finished tied for 6th overall and the high-powered, high offence, Edmonton Oilers tied for second overall. The Oilers set a new record, which they had set the previous year, for most goals in a season with 424 and were led by Wayne Gretzky's 196 points. The Oilers also tied the Boston Bruins' 1970–71 record for most 100-point players in one season as Wayne Gretzky, Glenn Anderson, Jari Kurri, and Mark Messier all scored more than 100 points.

The Washington Capitals qualified for the playoffs for the first time in franchise history.

=== Final standings ===
==== Prince of Wales Conference ====
Adams Division
	GP	W	L	T	GF	GA	Pts
Boston Bruins	80	50	20	10	327	228	110
Montreal Canadiens	80	42	24	14	350	286	98
Buffalo Sabres	80	38	29	13	318	285	89
Quebec Nordiques	80	34	34	12	343	336	80
Hartford Whalers	80	19	54	7	261	403	45

Patrick Division
	GP	W	L	T	GF	GA	Pts
Philadelphia Flyers	80	49	23	8	326	240	106
New York Islanders	80	42	26	12	302	226	96
Washington Capitals	80	39	25	16	306	283	94
New York Rangers	80	35	35	10	306	287	80
New Jersey Devils	80	17	49	14	230	338	48
Pittsburgh Penguins	80	18	53	9	250	394	45

==== Clarence Campbell Conference ====
Norris Division
	GP	W	L	T	GF	GA	Pts
Chicago Black Hawks	80	47	23	10	338	268	104
Minnesota North Stars	80	40	24	16	321	290	96
Toronto Maple Leafs	80	28	40	12	293	330	68
St. Louis Blues	80	25	40	15	285	316	65
Detroit Red Wings	80	21	44	15	263	344	57

Smythe Division
	GP	W	L	T	GF	GA	Pts
Edmonton Oilers	80	47	21	12	424	315	106
Calgary Flames	80	32	34	14	321	316	78
Vancouver Canucks	80	30	35	15	303	309	75
Winnipeg Jets	80	33	39	8	311	333	74
Los Angeles Kings	80	27	41	12	308	365	66

== Playoffs ==
=== Bracket ===
The top four teams in each division qualified for the playoffs. In the division semifinals, the fourth seeded team in each division played against the division winner from their division. The other series matched the second and third place teams from the divisions. The two winning teams from each division's semifinals then met in the division finals. The two division winners of each conference then played in the conference finals. The two conference winners then advanced to the Stanley Cup Final.

In the division semifinals, teams competed in a best-of-five series. In the other three rounds, teams competed in a best-of-seven series (scores in the bracket indicate the number of games won in each series).

Division semifinals	Division finals
A1	Boston	3
A4	Quebec	1
A1	Boston	4
A3	Buffalo	3
A2	Montreal	0
A3	Buffalo	3
Prince of Wales Conference
P1	Philadelphia	0
P4	NY Rangers	3
P4	NY Rangers	2
P2	NY Islanders	4
P2	NY Islanders	3
P3	Washington	1
N1	Chicago	3
N4	St. Louis	1
N1	Chicago	4
N2	Minnesota	1
N2	Minnesota	3
N3	Toronto	1
Clarence Campbell Conference
S1	Edmonton	3
S4	Winnipeg	0
S1	Edmonton	4
S2	Calgary	1
S2	Calgary	3
S3	Vancouver	1

Conference finals
A1	Boston	2
P2	NY Islanders	4
N1	Chicago	0
S1	Edmonton	4

Stanley Cup Final
P2	NY Islanders	4
S1	Edmonton	0

== Awards ==
1983 NHL awards
Prince of Wales Trophy: (Wales Conference playoff champion)	New York Islanders
Clarence S. Campbell Bowl: (Campbell Conference playoff champion)	Edmonton Oilers
Art Ross Trophy: (Top scorer, regular season)	Wayne Gretzky, Edmonton Oilers
Bill Masterton Memorial Trophy: (Perseverance, sportsmanship, and dedication)	Lanny McDonald, Calgary Flames
Calder Memorial Trophy: (Best first-year player)	Steve Larmer, Chicago Black Hawks
Conn Smythe Trophy: (Most valuable player, playoffs)	Billy Smith, New York Islanders
Frank J. Selke Trophy: (Best defensive forward)	Bobby Clarke, Philadelphia Flyers
Hart Memorial Trophy: (Most valuable player, regular season)	Wayne Gretzky, Edmonton Oilers
Jack Adams Award: (Best coach)	Orval Tessier, Chicago Black Hawks
James Norris Memorial Trophy: (Best defenceman)	Rod Langway, Washington Capitals
Lady Byng Memorial Trophy: (Excellence and sportsmanship)	Mike Bossy, New York Islanders
Lester B. Pearson Award: (Outstanding player, regular season)	Wayne Gretzky, Edmonton Oilers
NHL Plus/minus Award: (Player with best plus/minus record)	Charlie Huddy, Edmonton Oilers
William M. Jennings Trophy: (Goaltender(s) of team(s) with best goaltending record)	Roland Melanson/Billy Smith, New York Islanders
Vezina Trophy: (Best goaltender)	Pete Peeters, Boston Bruins

=== All-Star teams ===
First Team	Position	Second Team
Pete Peeters, Boston Bruins	G	Roland Melanson, New York Islanders
Mark Howe, Philadelphia Flyers	D	Ray Bourque, Boston Bruins
Rod Langway, Washington Capitals	D	Paul Coffey, Edmonton Oilers
Wayne Gretzky, Edmonton Oilers	C	Denis Savard, Chicago Black Hawks
Mike Bossy, New York Islanders	RW	Lanny McDonald, Calgary Flames
Mark Messier, Edmonton Oilers	LW	Michel Goulet, Quebec Nordiques

Source: NHL.

== Player statistics ==
=== Scoring leaders ===
Note: GP = Games played; G = Goals; A = Assists; Pts = Points

Player	Team	GP	G	A	Pts	PIM
Wayne Gretzky	Edmonton Oilers	80	71	125	196	59
Peter Stastny	Quebec Nordiques	75	47	77	124	78
Denis Savard	Chicago Black Hawks	78	35	86	121	99
Mike Bossy	New York Islanders	79	60	58	118	20
Marcel Dionne	Los Angeles Kings	80	56	51	107	22
Barry Pederson	Boston Bruins	77	46	61	107	47
Mark Messier	Edmonton Oilers	77	48	58	106	72
Michel Goulet	Quebec Nordiques	80	57	48	105	51
Glenn Anderson	Edmonton Oilers	72	48	56	104	70
Kent Nilsson	Calgary Flames	80	46	58	104	10
Jari Kurri	Edmonton Oilers	80	45	59	104	22

Source: NHL.

=== Leading goaltenders ===
Note: GP = Games played; Min = Minutes played; GA = Goals against; GAA = Goals against average; W = Wins; L = Losses; T = Ties; SO = Shutouts; SV% = Save percentage

Player	Team	GP	MIN	GA	GAA	W	L	T	SO	SV%
Pete Peeters	Boston Bruins	62	3611	142	2.36	40	11	9	8	.904
Bob Froese	Philadelphia Flyers	25	1407	59	2.52	17	4	2	4	.896
Rollie Melanson	N.Y. Islanders	44	2460	109	2.66	24	12	5	1	.910
Billy Smith	N.Y. Islanders	41	2340	112	2.87	18	14	7	1	.906
Pelle Lindbergh	Philadelphia Flyers	40	2333	116	2.98	23	13	3	3	.891
Murray Bannerman	Chicago Black Hawks	41	2460	127	3.10	24	12	5	4	.901
Richard Sevigny	Montreal Canadiens	38	2130	122	3.44	15	11	8	1	.883
Bob Sauve	Buffalo Sabres	52	3110	179	3.45	25	20	7	1	.872
Eddie Mio	N.Y. Rangers	41	2365	136	3.45	16	18	6	2	.883
Tony Esposito	Chicago Black Hawks	39	2340	135	3.46	23	11	5	1	.888

== Coaches ==
=== Patrick Division ===
- New Jersey Devils: Bill MacMillan
- New York Islanders: Al Arbour
- New York Rangers: Herb Brooks
- Philadelphia Flyers: Pat Quinn
- Pittsburgh Penguins: Eddie Johnston
- Washington Capitals: Bryan Murray

=== Adams Division ===
- Boston Bruins: Gerry Cheevers
- Buffalo Sabres: Scotty Bowman
- Hartford Whalers: Larry Kish, John Cunniff and Larry Pleau
- Montreal Canadiens: Bob Berry
- Quebec Nordiques: Michel Bergeron

=== Norris Division ===
- Chicago Black Hawks: Orval Tessier
- Detroit Red Wings: Nick Polano
- Minnesota North Stars: Glen Sonmor
- St. Louis Blues: Emile Francis and Barclay Plager
- Toronto Maple Leafs: Mike Nykoluk

=== Smythe Division ===
- Calgary Flames: Bob Johnson
- Edmonton Oilers: Glen Sather
- Los Angeles Kings: Don Perry
- Vancouver Canucks: Roger Neilson
- Winnipeg Jets: Tom Watt

== Milestones ==
=== Debuts ===
The following is a list of players of note who played their first NHL game in 1982–83 (listed with their first team, asterisk(*) marks debut in playoffs):

- Gord Kluzak, Boston Bruins
- Dave Andreychuk, Buffalo Sabres
- Phil Housley, Buffalo Sabres
- Jamie Macoun, Calgary Flames
- Murray Craven, Detroit Red Wings
- Brian Bellows, Minnesota North Stars
- Craig Ludwig, Montreal Canadiens
- Mats Naslund, Montreal Canadiens
- Pat Verbeek, New Jersey Devils
- Bob Froese, Philadelphia Flyers
- Dave Poulin, Philadelphia Flyers
- Ron Sutter, Philadelphia Flyers
- Rich Sutter, Pittsburgh Penguins
- Gary Leeman*, Toronto Maple Leafs
- Michel Petit, Vancouver Canucks
- Patrik Sundstrom, Vancouver Canucks
- Scott Stevens, Washington Capitals
- Brian Hayward, Winnipeg Jets
- Brian Mullen, Winnipeg Jets

=== Last games ===
The following is a list of players of note that played their last game in the NHL in 1982–83 (listed with their last team):

- Wayne Cashman, Boston Bruins (Last player from the Original Six Era)
- Gilles Gilbert, Detroit Red Wings
- Reggie Leach, Detroit Red Wings
- Garry Unger, Edmonton Oilers
- Mike Murphy, Los Angeles Kings
- Rejean Houle, Montreal Canadiens
- Carol Vadnais, New Jersey Devils
- John Davidson, New York Rangers
- Ulf Nilsson, New York Rangers
- Ian Turnbull, Pittsburgh Penguins
- Jacques Richard, Quebec Nordiques
- Marc Tardif, Quebec Nordiques
- Vaclav Nedomansky, St. Louis Blues
- Serge Savard, Winnipeg Jets

== Broadcasting ==
Hockey Night in Canada on CBC Television televised Saturday night regular season games and Stanley Cup playoff games.

This was the first season of the league's U.S. national broadcast rights deal with USA, covering a slate of regular season games and selected playoff games.

== See also ==
- List of Stanley Cup champions
- 1982 NHL entry draft
- 1982–83 NHL transactions
- 35th National Hockey League All-Star Game
- National Hockey League All-Star Game
- NHL All-Rookie Team
- Lester Patrick Trophy
- 1982 in sports
- 1983 in sports
