= 1982–83 Toronto Maple Leafs season =

NHL hockey team season

1982–83 Toronto Maple Leafs
- Division: 3rd Norris
- Conference: 7th Campbell
- 1982–83 record: 28–40–12
- Home record: 20–15–5
- Road record: 8–25–7
- Goals for: 293
- Goals against: 330

Team information
- General manager: Gerry McNamara
- Coach: Mike Nykoluk
- Captain: Rick Vaive
- Alternate captains: None
- Arena: Maple Leaf Gardens

Team leaders
- Goals: Rick Vaive (51)
- Assists: John Anderson (49)
- Points: John Anderson (80)
- Penalty minutes: Jim Korn (236)
- Wins: Mike Palmateer (21)
- Goals against average: Rick St. Croix (3.80)

The 1982–83 Toronto Maple Leafs season was the 66th season of the franchise, 56th season as the Maple Leafs. The team would qualify for the playoffs after missing the prior year.

== Offseason ==
=== NHL draft ===
Round	Pick	Player	Nationality	College/Junior/Club team
1	3	Gary Nylund	Canada	Portland Winter Hawks (WHL)
2	24	Gary Leeman	Canada	Regina Pats (WHL)
2	25	Peter Ihnacak	Czechoslovakia	Prague Sparta (Czechoslovakia)
3	45	Ken Wregget	Canada	Lethbridge Broncos (WHL)
4	73	Vladimir Ruzicka	Czechoslovakia	Litvinov (Czechoslovakia)
5	87	Eduard Uvira	Czechoslovakia	Jihlava (Czechoslovakia)
5	99	Sylvain Charland	Canada	Shawinigan Cataractes (QMJHL)
6	108	Ron Dreger	Canada	Saskatoon Blades (WHL)
6	115	Craig Kales	United States	Niagara Falls Flyers (OHL)
7	129	Dominic Campedelli	United States	Cohasset High School (USHS-MA)
7	139	Jeff Triano	Canada	Toronto Marlboros (OHL)
9	171	Miroslav Ihnacak	Czechoslovakia	Košice (Czechoslovakia)
10	192	Leigh Verstraete	Canada	Calgary Wranglers (WHL)
11	213	Tim Loven	United States	Red River High School (USHS-ND)
12	234	Jim Appleby	Canada	Winnipeg Warriors (WHL)

== Regular season ==
=== Final standings ===
Norris Division
	GP	W	L	T	GF	GA	Pts
**Chicago Black Hawks**	80	47	23	10	338	268	104
**Minnesota North Stars**	80	40	24	16	321	290	96
**Toronto Maple Leafs**	80	28	40	12	293	330	68
**St. Louis Blues**	80	25	40	15	285	316	65
Detroit Red Wings	80	21	44	15	263	344	57

Note: GP = Games played, W = Wins, L = Losses, T = Ties, Pts = Points, GF = Goals for, GA = Goals against
Note: Teams that qualified for the playoffs are highlighted in bold.

=== Record vs. opponents ===
Norris Division record vs. opponents

==== Vs. Campbell Conference ====
**Vs. Norris Division**

1982–83 NHL records
Team	**CHI**	**DET**	**MIN**	**STL**	**TOR**	**Total**
Chicago	—	6−2	3−4−1	6−2	6−1−1	**21−9−2**
Detroit	2−6	—	0−6−2	1−5−2	4−4	**7−21−4**
Minnesota	4−3−1	6−0−2	—	3−0−5	3−5	**16−8−8**
St. Louis	2−6	5−1−2	0−3−5	—	3−3−2	**10−13−9**
Toronto	1−6−1	4−4	5−3	3−3−2	—	**13−16−3**

**Vs. Smythe Division**

1982–83 NHL records
Team	**CGY**	**EDM**	**LAK**	**VAN**	**WIN**	**Total**
Chicago	1−2	1−1−1	2−0−1	0−1−2	2−1	**6−5−4**
Detroit	1−2	1−2	0−1−2	1−1−1	0−3	**3−9−3**
Minnesota	1−1−1	1−2	2−1	2−0−1	3−0	**9−4−2**
St. Louis	1−2	0−2−1	2−1	0−3	1−2	**4−10−1**
Toronto	1−1−1	0−2−1	1−2	2−1	0−3	**4−9−2**

**Vs. Wales Conference**

**Vs. Adams Division**

1982–83 NHL records
Team	**BOS**	**BUF**	**HFD**	**MTL**	**QUE**	**Total**
Chicago	0−3	1−1−1	3−0	3−0	2−1	**9−5−1**
Detroit	0−3	1−1−1	3−0	0−1−2	1−1−1	**5−6−4**
Minnesota	0−3	2−0−1	2−0−1	0−3	1−2	**5−8−2**
St. Louis	0−3	1−2	2−1	0−2−1	1−1−1	**4−9−2**
Toronto	1−2	2−0−1	2−1	1−0−2	1−1−1	**7−4−4**

**Vs. Patrick Division**

1982–83 NHL records
Team	**NJD**	**NYI**	**NYR**	**PHI**	**PIT**	**WSH**	**Total**
Chicago	3−0	1−1−1	3−0	1−1−1	3−0	0−2−1	**11−4−3**
Detroit	1−1−1	2−0−1	0−2−1	0−3	2−0−1	1−2	**6−8−4**
Minnesota	3−0	2−0−1	1−2	1−1−1	2−0−1	1−1−1	**10−4−4**
St. Louis	2−0−1	1−2	0−2−1	0−3	3−0	1−1−1	**7−8−3**
Toronto	0−1−2	1−2	0−3	0−2−1	2−1	1−2	**4−11−3**

== Schedule and results ==
1982–83 regular season
October

Game	Result	Date	Score	Opponent	Record
1	T	October 6, 1982	3–3	@ Chicago Black Hawks (1982–83)	0–0–1
2	L	October 7, 1982	2–3	@ St. Louis Blues (1982–83)	0–1–1
3	T	October 9, 1982	5–5	New Jersey Devils (1982–83)	0–1–2
4	L	October 13, 1982	3–5	Washington Capitals (1982–83)	0–2–2
5	L	October 14, 1982	2–6	@ Minnesota North Stars (1982–83)	0–3–2
6	L	October 16, 1982	2–3	Chicago Black Hawks (1982–83)	0–4–2
7	W	October 20, 1982	5–2	Minnesota North Stars (1982–83)	1–4–2
8	T	October 23, 1982	5–5	Calgary Flames (1982–83)	1–4–3
9	L	October 26, 1982	4–9	@ Quebec Nordiques (1982–83)	1–5–3
10	W	October 27, 1982	4–1	Boston Bruins (1982–83)	2–5–3
11	T	October 30, 1982	3–3	Buffalo Sabres (1982–83)	2–5–4

November

Game	Result	Date	Score	Opponent	Record
12	L	November 3, 1982	2–6	@ Los Angeles Kings (1982–83)	2–6–4
13	T	November 6, 1982	3–3	@ St. Louis Blues (1982–83)	2–6–5
14	L	November 7, 1982	3–7	@ Chicago Black Hawks (1982–83)	2–7–5
15	W	November 10, 1982	8–2	Detroit Red Wings (1982–83)	3–7–5
16	W	November 13, 1982	4–3	Minnesota North Stars (1982–83)	4–7–5
17	L	November 17, 1982	1–6	@ New York Rangers (1982–83)	4–8–5
18	L	November 20, 1982	3–6	New York Rangers (1982–83)	4–9–5
19	L	November 24, 1982	3–4	@ Pittsburgh Penguins (1982–83)	4–10–5
20	L	November 26, 1982	3–5	@ Washington Capitals (1982–83)	4–11–5
21	L	November 27, 1982	3–6	Winnipeg Jets (1982–83)	4–12–5

December

Game	Result	Date	Score	Opponent	Record
22	L	December 1, 1982	3–7	@ New Jersey Devils (1982–83)	4–13–5
23	W	December 4, 1982	4–1	New York Islanders (1982–83)	5–13–5
24	L	December 5, 1982	5–6	@ New York Rangers (1982–83)	5–14–5
25	L	December 7, 1982	3–6	@ New York Islanders (1982–83)	5–15–5
26	L	December 8, 1982	3–7	Vancouver Canucks (1982–83)	5–16–5
27	L	December 11, 1982	2–6	Detroit Red Wings (1982–83)	5–17–5
28	T	December 14, 1982	4–4	@ Quebec Nordiques (1982–83)	5–17–6
29	L	December 15, 1982	2–4	St. Louis Blues (1982–83)	5–18–6
30	L	December 18, 1982	5–8	Chicago Black Hawks (1982–83)	5–19–6
31	L	December 22, 1982	3–4	@ Chicago Black Hawks (1982–83)	5–20–6
32	L	December 23, 1982	3–7	@ St. Louis Blues (1982–83)	5–21–6
33	T	December 28, 1982	4–4	@ Montreal Canadiens (1982–83)	5–21–7
34	W	December 29, 1982	6–5	Montreal Canadiens (1982–83)	6–21–7

January

Game	Result	Date	Score	Opponent	Record
35	W	January 1, 1983	7–5	Hartford Whalers (1982–83)	7–21–7
36	W	January 2, 1983	6–3	Detroit Red Wings (1982–83)	8–21–7
37	T	January 5, 1983	4–4	@ New Jersey Devils (1982–83)	8–21–8
38	W	January 6, 1983	3–1	@ Washington Capitals (1982–83)	9–21–8
39	W	January 8, 1983	7–5	Los Angeles Kings (1982–83)	10–21–8
40	L	January 12, 1983	4–6	Boston Bruins (1982–83)	10–22–8
41	L	January 13, 1983	1–2	@ Minnesota North Stars (1982–83)	10–23–8
42	L	January 15, 1983	3–4	@ Detroit Red Wings (1982–83)	10–24–8
43	T	January 17, 1983	4–4	St. Louis Blues (1982–83)	10–24–9
44	L	January 19, 1983	3–6	@ Winnipeg Jets (1982–83)	10–25–9
45	L	January 22, 1983	2–3	Chicago Black Hawks (1982–83)	10–26–9
46	W	January 24, 1983	8–2	Pittsburgh Penguins (1982–83)	11–26–9
47	T	January 26, 1983	6–6	@ Edmonton Oilers (1982–83)	11–26–10
48	L	January 27, 1983	1–3	@ Calgary Flames (1982–83)	11–27–10
49	W	January 29, 1983	5–3	Buffalo Sabres (1982–83)	12–27–10
50	L	January 31, 1983	2–4	Minnesota North Stars (1982–83)	12–28–10

February

Game	Result	Date	Score	Opponent	Record
51	W	February 2, 1983	7–1	Hartford Whalers (1982–83)	13–28–10
52	W	February 5, 1983	6–4	Vancouver Canucks (1982–83)	14–28–10
53	L	February 6, 1983	0–3	@ Detroit Red Wings (1982–83)	14–29–10
54	L	February 13, 1983	3–5	@ Hartford Whalers (1982–83)	14–30–10
55	W	February 16, 1983	6–3	St. Louis Blues (1982–83)	15–30–10
56	W	February 17, 1983	6–3	@ St. Louis Blues (1982–83)	16–30–10
57	W	February 19, 1983	5–3	Calgary Flames (1982–83)	17–30–10
58	W	February 21, 1983	4–2	Pittsburgh Penguins (1982–83)	18–30–10
59	W	February 23, 1983	3–2	@ Minnesota North Stars (1982–83)	19–30–10
60	W	February 25, 1983	4–1	@ Vancouver Canucks (1982–83)	20–30–10
61	L	February 26, 1983	2–6	@ Los Angeles Kings (1982–83)	20–31–10
62	L	February 28, 1983	3–6	@ Boston Bruins (1982–83)	20–32–10

March

Game	Result	Date	Score	Opponent	Record
63	T	March 2, 1983	2–2	Philadelphia Flyers (1982–83)	20–32–11
64	L	March 3, 1983	1–5	@ New York Islanders (1982–83)	20–33–11
65	L	March 5, 1983	3–6	Edmonton Oilers (1982–83)	20–34–11
66	T	March 8, 1983	3–3	@ Montreal Canadiens (1982–83)	20–34–12
67	W	March 9, 1983	5–2	St. Louis Blues (1982–83)	21–34–12
68	W	March 12, 1983	4–2	Chicago Black Hawks (1982–83)	22–34–12
69	W	March 13, 1983	5–2	@ Detroit Red Wings (1982–83)	23–34–12
70	L	March 16, 1983	3–4	Detroit Red Wings (1982–83)	23–35–12
71	L	March 18, 1983	3–7	@ Winnipeg Jets (1982–83)	23–36–12
72	L	March 20, 1983	3–7	@ Chicago Black Hawks (1982–83)	23–37–12
73	L	March 21, 1983	1–4	Edmonton Oilers (1982–83)	23–38–12
74	W	March 23, 1983	6–3	Minnesota North Stars (1982–83)	24–38–12
75	L	March 24, 1983	4–7	@ Philadelphia Flyers (1982–83)	24–39–12
76	W	March 26, 1983	2–1	Quebec Nordiques (1982–83)	25–39–12
77	W	March 29, 1983	4–2	@ Minnesota North Stars (1982–83)	26–39–12
78	W	March 30, 1983	4–2	@ Detroit Red Wings (1982–83)	27–39–12

April

Game	Result	Date	Score	Opponent	Record
79	L	April 2, 1983	3–6	Philadelphia Flyers (1982–83)	27–40–12
80	W	April 3, 1983	4–3	@ Buffalo Sabres (1982–83)	28–40–12

Legend: Win (2 points) Loss (0 points) Tie (1 point)

== Player statistics ==
=== Regular season ===
Scoring

Player	Pos	GP	G	A	Pts	PIM	+/-	PPG	SHG	GWG
John Anderson	RW	80	31	49	80	24	-6	9	0	6
Rick Vaive	RW	78	51	28	79	105	-13	18	3	8
Peter Ihnacak	C	80	28	38	66	44	6	6	0	2
Walt Poddubny	LW	72	28	31	59	71	8	9	0	3
Miroslav Frycer	RW	67	25	30	55	90	2	5	0	4
Dan Daoust	C	48	18	33	51	31	-1	9	0	0
Borje Salming	D	69	7	38	45	104	-3	2	1	0
Bill Derlago	C	58	13	24	37	27	-19	5	0	1
Greg Terrion	LW	74	16	16	32	59	-3	0	3	1
Billy Harris	RW	76	11	19	30	26	-15	0	1	0
Jim Korn	D/LW	80	8	21	29	236	-27	0	3	1
Gaston Gingras	D	45	10	18	28	10	7	4	0	1
Dave Farrish	D	56	4	24	28	38	1	3	0	0
Terry Martin	LW	76	14	13	27	28	-29	3	1	0
Jim Benning	D	74	5	17	22	47	-8	3	0	0
Frank Nigro	C	51	6	15	21	23	-1	1	0	0
Mike Kaszycki	C	22	1	13	14	10	0	0	0	0
Stew Gavin	LW	63	6	5	11	44	-7	0	0	0
Vitezslav Duris	D	32	2	8	10	12	3	0	1	0
Barry Melrose	D	52	2	5	7	68	-16	0	0	0
Norm Aubin	C	26	4	1	5	8	-9	2	0	1
Fred Boimistruck	D	26	2	3	5	13	-3	0	0	0
Russ Adam	C	8	1	2	3	11	-3	0	0	0
Gary Nylund	D	16	0	3	3	16	0	0	0	0
Mike Palmateer	G	53	0	3	3	17	0	0	0	0
Serge Boisvert	RW	17	0	2	2	4	-10	0	0	0
Marc Magnan	LW	4	0	1	1	5	0	0	0	0
Craig Muni	D	2	0	1	1	0	-3	0	0	0
David Shand	D	1	0	1	1	2	2	0	0	0
Reid Bailey	D	1	0	0	0	2	-2	0	0	0
Paul Higgins	RW	22	0	0	0	135	-3	0	0	0
Michel Larocque	G	16	0	0	0	0	0	0	0	0
Bob McGill	D	30	0	0	0	146	-24	0	0	0
Bob Parent	G	1	0	0	0	0	0	0	0	0
Rocky Saganiuk	RW/C	3	0	0	0	2	-3	0	0	0
Rick St. Croix	G	17	0	0	0	0	0	0	0	0
Ken Strong	LW	2	0	0	0	0	0	0	0	0
Vincent Tremblay	G	1	0	0	0	0	0	0	0	0
Leigh Verstraete	RW	3	0	0	0	5	0	0	0	0
Rod Willard	LW	1	0	0	0	0	-1	0	0	0
Gary Yaremchuk	C	3	0	0	0	2	-1	0	0	0

Goaltending

Player	MIN	GP	W	L	T	GA	GAA	SO
Mike Palmateer	2965	53	21	23	7	197	3.99	0
Rick St. Croix	920	17	4	9	2	58	3.78	0
Michel Larocque	835	16	3	8	3	68	4.89	0
Bob Parent	40	1	0	0	0	2	3.00	0
Vincent Tremblay	40	1	0	0	0	2	3.00	0
Team:	4800	80	28	40	12	327	4.09	0

=== Playoffs ===
Scoring

Player	Pos	GP	G	A	Pts	PIM	PPG	SHG	GWG
Miroslav Frycer	RW	4	2	5	7	0	0	0	0
Rick Vaive	RW	4	2	5	7	6	0	0	0
John Anderson	RW	4	2	4	6	0	1	0	0
Borje Salming	D	4	1	4	5	10	1	0	0
Walt Poddubny	LW	4	3	1	4	0	2	0	1
Bill Derlago	C	4	3	0	3	2	2	0	0
Gaston Gingras	D	3	1	2	3	2	0	0	0
Greg Terrion	LW	4	1	2	3	2	0	0	0
Jim Benning	D	4	1	1	2	2	0	0	0
Bruce Boudreau	C	4	1	0	1	0	0	0	0
David Shand	D	4	1	0	1	13	0	0	0
Billy Harris	RW	4	0	1	1	2	0	0	0
Barry Melrose	D	4	0	1	1	23	0	0	0
Norm Aubin	C	1	0	0	0	0	0	0	0
Reid Bailey	D	2	0	0	0	2	0	0	0
Stew Gavin	LW	4	0	0	0	0	0	0	0
Paul Higgins	RW	1	0	0	0	0	0	0	0
Jim Korn	D/LW	3	0	0	0	26	0	0	0
Gary Leeman	RW	2	0	0	0	0	0	0	0
Terry Martin	LW	4	0	0	0	9	0	0	0
Frank Nigro	C	3	0	0	0	2	0	0	0
Mike Palmateer	G	4	0	0	0	2	0	0	0
Rick St. Croix	G	1	0	0	0	0	0	0	0

Goaltending

Player	MIN	GP	W	L	GA	GAA	SO
Mike Palmateer	252	4	1	3	17	4.05	0
Rick St. Croix	1	1	0	0	1	60.00	0
Team:	253	4	1	3	18	4.27	0

Note:

Pos = Position;GP = Games played; G = Goals; A = Assists; Pts = Points; PIM = Penalty minutes; +/- = Plus/minus; PPG = Power-play goals; SHG = Short-handed goals; GWG = Game-winning goals
Pos = Position;GP = Games played; Min, TOI = Minutes played; W = Wins; L = Losses; T,T/OT = Ties; OTL = Overtime losses; GA = Goals-against; GAA = Goals-against average; SO = Shutouts; SA = Shots against; SV = Shots saved;SV% = Save percentage;

== Playoffs ==
Despite rocky standings, the Leafs managed to make the playoffs. However, they lost in the preliminary round to the Minnesota North Stars.

=== Preliminary round: (N2) Minnesota North Stars vs. (N3) Toronto Maple Leafs ===
April 6	Toronto Maple Leafs	4–5	Minnesota North Stars	Met Center	Recap
Gaston Gingras (1) – 07:37		First period	00:34 – Brian Bellows (1); 12:36 – Dino Ciccarelli (1)
Borje Salming (1) – pp – 00:59		Second period	15:18 – pp – Neal Broten (1)
Jim Benning (1) – 00:44; Walt Poddubny (1) – pp – 14:36		Third period	06:35 – Brad Maxwell (1); 19:38 – pp – Bobby Smith (1)
Mike Palmateer 40 saves / 44 shots Rick St. Croix 0 saves / 1 shot		Goalie stats	Don Beaupre 27 saves / 31 shots

April 7	Toronto Maple Leafs	4–5	OT	Minnesota North Stars	Met Center	Recap
Miroslav Frycer (1) – 01:05; Bill Derlago (1) – pp – 07:48		First period		18:43 – Steve Payne (1)
Walt Poddubny (2) – 14:51		Second period		03:43 – Ron Friest (1); 09:29 – Gordie Roberts (1)
Dave Shand (1) – 08:01		Third period		17:32 – Bobby Smith (2)
No scoring		First overtime period		05:03 – Bobby Smith (3)
Mike Palmateer 40 saves / 45 shots		Goalie stats		Don Beaupre 35 saves / 39 shots

April 9	Minnesota North Stars	3–6	Toronto Maple Leafs	Maple Leaf Gardens	Recap
No scoring		First period	06:49 – Greg Terrion (1)
Brad Maxwell (2) – pp – 05:35; Brian Bellows (2) – 13:03; Steve Payne (2) – 16:08		Second period	10:59 – pp – John Anderson (1); 15:46 – Miroslav Frycer (2)
No scoring		Third period	05:51 – pp – Walt Poddubny (3); 10:42 – Bruce Boudreau (1); 18:53 – en – John Anderson (2)
Don Beaupre 32 saves / 37 shots		Goalie stats	Mike Palmateer 47 saves / 50 shots

April 10	Minnesota North Stars	5–4	OT	Toronto Maple Leafs	Maple Leaf Gardens	Recap
No scoring		First period		No scoring
Brad Maxwell (3) – pp – 10:59		Second period		05:17 – pp – Bill Derlago (2); 19:17 – Bill Derlago (3)
Bobby Smith (4) – 00:12; Brian Bellows (3) – pp – 10:41; Brian Bellows (4) – 19:38		Third period		06:22 – Rick Vaive (1); 17:13 – Rick Vaive (2)
Dino Ciccarelli (2) – 08:05		First overtime period		No scoring
Gilles Meloche 23 saves / 27 shots		Goalie stats		Mike Palmateer 38 saves / 43 shots

Minnesota won series 3–1

== Transactions ==
The Maple Leafs were involved in the following transactions during the 1982–83 season.

=== Trades ===
September 9, 1982	To Washington Capitals Cash	To Toronto Maple Leafs Mike Palmateer
October 5, 1982	To Hartford Whalers Paul Marshall	To Toronto Maple Leafs 10th round pick in 1983 – Greg Rolston
October 19, 1982	To Los Angeles Kings 4th round pick in 1983 – Dave Korol	To Toronto Maple Leafs Greg Terrion
December 17, 1982	To Montreal Canadiens 2nd round pick in 1986 – Benoît Brunet	To Toronto Maple Leafs Gaston Gingras
January 10, 1983	To Minnesota North Stars Dave Logan	To Toronto Maple Leafs Cash
January 10, 1983	To Philadelphia Flyers Michel Larocque	To Toronto Maple Leafs Rick St. Croix
January 15, 1983	To Edmonton Oilers Serge Boisvert	To Toronto Maple Leafs Reid Bailey
January 23, 1983	To Chicago Black Hawks Rod Willard	To Toronto Maple Leafs Dave Snopek

=== Free agents ===
Player	Former team
Rod Willard	Undrafted Free Agent
Bruce Dowie	Undrafted Free Agent
