= 1982–83 Detroit Red Wings season =

National Hockey League team season

1982–83 Detroit Red Wings
- Division: 5th Norris
- Conference: 10th Campbell
- 1982–83 record: 21–44–15
- Home record: 14–19–7
- Road record: 7–25–8
- Goals for: 263
- Goals against: 344

Team information
- General manager: Jim Devellano
- Coach: Nick Polano
- Captain: Danny Gare
- Alternate captains: None
- Arena: Joe Louis Arena
- Average attendance: 12,994

Team leaders
- Goals: John Ogrodnick (41)
- Assists: Reed Larson (52)
- Points: John Ogrodnick (87)
- Penalty minutes: Danny Gare (107)
- Plus/minus: John Ogrodnick (+11)
- Wins: Corrado Micalef (11)
- Goals against average: Corrado Micalef (3.63)

The 1982–83 Detroit Red Wings season was the Red Wings' 51st season, 57th overall for the franchise. They finished fifth in the Norris Division and missed the playoffs for the fifth consecutive season 1972–73 season and the 1976–77 season and for the first time since the 1980–81 season they finished last in the conference.

== Offseason ==
After fifty years of Norris family ownership, Bruce A. Norris, who had himself owned the Red Wings since his father's passing in 1952, sold the Red Wings to Little Caesars Pizza founder Mike Ilitch. Ilitch then proceeded to hire general manager Jim Devellano away from the three-time defending Stanley Cup champion New York Islanders. Nick Polano was then hired as head coach, coming from the Buffalo Sabres where he had served as an assistant under Scotty Bowman.

Under this new management, the Red Wings opted to modernize their uniforms. The crew collars were replaced with V-necks, and the logo was realigned to be centered on the jersey, instead of having the wheel centered underneath the collar. The most striking change, though, was to the players' names and numbers. The Red Wings adopted vertically arched lettering for the names on the back, as well as a fanciful number font with flourishes reminiscent of their wordmark. The unique number font would only last one year, though it would return for the Red Wings' 2014 Winter Classic uniforms, while the vertically arched names remain a part of the Red Wings uniforms to this day.

== Regular season ==
=== Final standings ===
Norris Division
	GP	W	L	T	GF	GA	Pts
**Chicago Black Hawks**	80	47	23	10	338	268	104
**Minnesota North Stars**	80	40	24	16	321	290	96
**Toronto Maple Leafs**	80	28	40	12	293	330	68
**St. Louis Blues**	80	25	40	15	285	316	65
Detroit Red Wings	80	21	44	15	263	344	57

Note: GP = Games played, W = Wins, L = Losses, T = Ties, Pts = Points, GF = Goals for, GA = Goals against
Note: Teams that qualified for the playoffs are highlighted in bold.

=== Record vs. opponents ===
Norris Division record vs. opponents

==== Vs. Campbell Conference ====
**Vs. Norris Division**

1982–83 NHL records
Team	**CHI**	**DET**	**MIN**	**STL**	**TOR**	**Total**
Chicago	—	6−2	3−4−1	6−2	6−1−1	**21−9−2**
Detroit	2−6	—	0−6−2	1−5−2	4−4	**7−21−4**
Minnesota	4−3−1	6−0−2	—	3−0−5	3−5	**16−8−8**
St. Louis	2−6	5−1−2	0−3−5	—	3−3−2	**10−13−9**
Toronto	1−6−1	4−4	5−3	3−3−2	—	**13−16−3**

**Vs. Smythe Division**

1982–83 NHL records
Team	**CGY**	**EDM**	**LAK**	**VAN**	**WIN**	**Total**
Chicago	1−2	1−1−1	2−0−1	0−1−2	2−1	**6−5−4**
Detroit	1−2	1−2	0−1−2	1−1−1	0−3	**3−9−3**
Minnesota	1−1−1	1−2	2−1	2−0−1	3−0	**9−4−2**
St. Louis	1−2	0−2−1	2−1	0−3	1−2	**4−10−1**
Toronto	1−1−1	0−2−1	1−2	2−1	0−3	**4−9−2**

**Vs. Wales Conference**

**Vs. Adams Division**

1982–83 NHL records
Team	**BOS**	**BUF**	**HFD**	**MTL**	**QUE**	**Total**
Chicago	0−3	1−1−1	3−0	3−0	2−1	**9−5−1**
Detroit	0−3	1−1−1	3−0	0−1−2	1−1−1	**5−6−4**
Minnesota	0−3	2−0−1	2−0−1	0−3	1−2	**5−8−2**
St. Louis	0−3	1−2	2−1	0−2−1	1−1−1	**4−9−2**
Toronto	1−2	2−0−1	2−1	1−0−2	1−1−1	**7−4−4**

**Vs. Patrick Division**

1982–83 NHL records
Team	**NJD**	**NYI**	**NYR**	**PHI**	**PIT**	**WSH**	**Total**
Chicago	3−0	1−1−1	3−0	1−1−1	3−0	0−2−1	**11−4−3**
Detroit	1−1−1	2−0−1	0−2−1	0−3	2−0−1	1−2	**6−8−4**
Minnesota	3−0	2−0−1	1−2	1−1−1	2−0−1	1−1−1	**10−4−4**
St. Louis	2−0−1	1−2	0−2−1	0−3	3−0	1−1−1	**7−8−3**
Toronto	0−1−2	1−2	0−3	0−2−1	2−1	1−2	**4−11−3**

== Schedule and results ==
1982–83 regular season
October

Game	Result	Date	Score	Opponent	Record
1	L	October 6, 1982	1–2	St. Louis Blues (1982–83)	0–1–0
2	T	October 8, 1982	3–3	@ Minnesota North Stars (1982–83)	0–1–1
3	L	October 9, 1982	0–8	Winnipeg Jets (1982–83)	0–2–1
4	L	October 14, 1982	4–6	@ Calgary Flames (1982–83)	0–3–1
5	L	October 16, 1982	0–6	@ St. Louis Blues (1982–83)	0–4–1
6	L	October 17, 1982	4–6	@ Chicago Black Hawks (1982–83)	0–5–1
7	L	October 20, 1982	3–5	Quebec Nordiques (1982–83)	0–6–1
8	W	October 23, 1982	6–2	Buffalo Sabres (1982–83)	1–6–1
9	L	October 24, 1982	4–7	@ Philadelphia Flyers (1982–83)	1–7–1
10	W	October 27, 1982	5–4	St. Louis Blues (1982–83)	2–7–1
11	L	October 28, 1982	3–7	@ Minnesota North Stars (1982–83)	2–8–1
12	W	October 30, 1982	4–2	@ Hartford Whalers (1982–83)	3–8–1

November

Game	Result	Date	Score	Opponent	Record
13	L	November 2, 1982	2–4	@ St. Louis Blues (1982–83)	3–9–1
14	T	November 3, 1982	3–3	New York Islanders (1982–83)	3–9–2
15	T	November 6, 1982	1–1	New Jersey Devils (1982–83)	3–9–3
16	L	November 7, 1982	0–7	@ Boston Bruins (1982–83)	3–10–3
17	L	November 10, 1982	2–8	@ Toronto Maple Leafs (1982–83)	3–11–3
18	L	November 13, 1982	2–3	Chicago Black Hawks (1982–83)	3–12–3
19	T	November 16, 1982	4–4	@ Vancouver Canucks (1982–83)	3–12–4
20	L	November 18, 1982	1–4	@ Los Angeles Kings (1982–83)	3–13–4
21	T	November 20, 1982	2–2	@ St. Louis Blues (1982–83)	3–13–5
22	L	November 21, 1982	0–3	@ Chicago Black Hawks (1982–83)	3–14–5
23	L	November 24, 1982	2–4	Montreal Canadiens (1982–83)	3–15–5
24	T	November 27, 1982	5–5	@ Montreal Canadiens (1982–83)	3–15–6
25	L	November 28, 1982	5–7	Edmonton Oilers (1982–83)	3–16–6

December

Game	Result	Date	Score	Opponent	Record
26	L	December 1, 1982	1–4	Minnesota North Stars (1982–83)	3–17–6
27	W	December 4, 1982	6–2	New Jersey Devils (1982–83)	4–17–6
28	W	December 8, 1982	2–0	New York Islanders (1982–83)	5–17–6
29	W	December 11, 1982	6–2	@ Toronto Maple Leafs (1982–83)	6–17–6
30	W	December 12, 1982	7–3	Calgary Flames (1982–83)	7–17–6
31	T	December 15, 1982	4–4	@ Pittsburgh Penguins (1982–83)	7–17–7
32	L	December 16, 1982	2–7	@ Philadelphia Flyers (1982–83)	7–18–7
33	T	December 18, 1982	3–3	New York Rangers (1982–83)	7–18–8
34	T	December 21, 1982	5–5	St. Louis Blues (1982–83)	7–18–9
35	W	December 23, 1982	6–4	Pittsburgh Penguins (1982–83)	8–18–9
36	T	December 26, 1982	2–2	@ Buffalo Sabres (1982–83)	8–18–10
37	L	December 27, 1982	4–8	Philadelphia Flyers (1982–83)	8–19–10
38	T	December 29, 1982	5–5	@ Minnesota North Stars (1982–83)	8–19–11
39	W	December 31, 1982	4–1	Chicago Black Hawks (1982–83)	9–19–11

January

Game	Result	Date	Score	Opponent	Record
40	L	January 2, 1983	3–6	@ Toronto Maple Leafs (1982–83)	9–20–11
41	L	January 3, 1983	2–6	@ New York Rangers (1982–83)	9–21–11
42	L	January 5, 1983	2–5	Washington Capitals (1982–83)	9–22–11
43	L	January 8, 1983	2–5	@ Calgary Flames (1982–83)	9–23–11
44	W	January 9, 1983	4–3	@ Edmonton Oilers (1982–83)	10–23–11
45	T	January 13, 1983	4–4	Los Angeles Kings (1982–83)	10–23–12
46	W	January 15, 1983	4–3	Toronto Maple Leafs (1982–83)	11–23–12
47	L	January 16, 1983	2–4	@ Chicago Black Hawks (1982–83)	11–24–12
48	L	January 19, 1983	2–3	@ Minnesota North Stars (1982–83)	11–25–12
49	L	January 22, 1983	1–3	Boston Bruins (1982–83)	11–26–12
50	W	January 25, 1983	6–2	Vancouver Canucks (1982–83)	12–26–12
51	L	January 29, 1983	3–7	@ Boston Bruins (1982–83)	12–27–12

February

Game	Result	Date	Score	Opponent	Record
52	L	February 1, 1983	2–5	@ Washington Capitals (1982–83)	12–28–12
53	L	February 2, 1983	3–4	St. Louis Blues (1982–83)	12–29–12
54	L	February 5, 1983	3–4	Chicago Black Hawks (1982–83)	12–30–12
55	W	February 6, 1983	3–0	Toronto Maple Leafs (1982–83)	13–30–12
56	W	February 9, 1983	6–5	@ Hartford Whalers (1982–83)	14–30–12
57	L	February 12, 1983	2–4	Winnipeg Jets (1982–83)	14–31–12
58	W	February 15, 1983	7–3	@ Pittsburgh Penguins (1982–83)	15–31–12
59	T	February 17, 1983	5–5	Los Angeles Kings (1982–83)	15–31–13
60	W	February 20, 1983	7–2	Hartford Whalers (1982–83)	16–31–13
61	L	February 22, 1983	2–3	Minnesota North Stars (1982–83)	16–32–13
62	L	February 24, 1983	1–4	@ New Jersey Devils (1982–83)	16–33–13
63	W	February 26, 1983	5–3	@ New York Islanders (1982–83)	17–33–13
64	T	February 27, 1983	4–4	Montreal Canadiens (1982–83)	17–33–14

March

Game	Result	Date	Score	Opponent	Record
65	T	March 1, 1983	5–5	@ Quebec Nordiques (1982–83)	17–33–15
66	W	March 3, 1983	5–3	Quebec Nordiques (1982–83)	18–33–15
67	L	March 5, 1983	1–4	Minnesota North Stars (1982–83)	18–34–15
68	L	March 6, 1983	4–6	@ Buffalo Sabres (1982–83)	18–35–15
69	W	March 10, 1983	4–2	Chicago Black Hawks (1982–83)	19–35–15
70	L	March 12, 1983	1–2	@ St. Louis Blues (1982–83)	19–36–15
71	L	March 13, 1983	2–5	Toronto Maple Leafs (1982–83)	19–37–15
72	W	March 16, 1983	4–3	@ Toronto Maple Leafs (1982–83)	20–37–15
73	L	March 19, 1983	7–9	@ Edmonton Oilers (1982–83)	20–38–15
74	L	March 20, 1983	3–6	@ Vancouver Canucks (1982–83)	20–39–15
75	L	March 23, 1983	1–7	New York Rangers (1982–83)	20–40–15
76	L	March 26, 1983	5–7	Minnesota North Stars (1982–83)	20–41–15
77	L	March 27, 1983	0–6	@ Chicago Black Hawks (1982–83)	20–42–15
78	L	March 30, 1983	2–4	Toronto Maple Leafs (1982–83)	20–43–15

April

Game	Result	Date	Score	Opponent	Record
79	W	April 1, 1983	8–7	Washington Capitals (1982–83)	21–43–15
80	L	April 3, 1983	3–8	@ Winnipeg Jets (1982–83)	21–44–15

Legend: Win (2 points) Loss (0 points) Tie (1 point)

== Player statistics ==
=== Regular season ===
Scoring

Player	Pos	GP	G	A	Pts	PIM	+/-	PPG	SHG	GWG
John Ogrodnick	LW	80	41	44	85	30	11	5	0	2
Reed Larson	D	80	22	52	74	104	-7	7	1	1
Danny Gare	RW	79	26	35	61	107	-16	6	0	3
Mark Osborne	LW	80	19	24	43	83	-41	3	0	3
Willie Huber	D	74	14	29	43	106	-34	3	0	1
Walt McKechnie	C	64	14	29	43	42	1	3	3	0
Mike Blaisdell	RW	80	18	23	41	22	-6	0	0	2
Dwight Foster	RW	58	17	22	39	58	-8	3	1	1
Paul Woods	LW	63	13	20	33	30	-2	0	1	3
Reggie Leach	RW	78	15	17	32	13	-1	2	0	0
Ivan Boldirev	C	33	13	17	30	14	-6	3	1	0
Greg Smith	D	73	4	26	30	79	7	0	0	0
Stan Weir	C	57	5	24	29	2	0	1	0	1
Tom Rowe	RW	51	6	10	16	44	-17	0	0	1
John Barrett	D	79	4	10	14	74	-18	0	0	0
Mark Lofthouse	RW/C	28	8	4	12	18	8	0	0	0
Derek Smith	C/LW	42	7	4	11	12	-7	1	0	0
Murray Craven	LW	31	4	7	11	6	4	0	0	1
Jim Schoenfeld	D	57	1	10	11	18	-14	0	0	1
Colin Campbell	D	53	1	7	8	74	2	0	0	0
Kelly Kisio	C	15	4	3	7	0	-2	0	0	0
Randy Ladouceur	D	27	0	4	4	16	-10	0	0	0
Joe Paterson	LW	33	2	1	3	14	-8	0	0	1
Gilles Gilbert	G	20	0	3	3	4	0	0	0	0
Bobby Francis	C	14	2	0	2	0	-1	0	0	0
Claude Loiselle	C	18	2	0	2	15	-14	0	0	0
Mark Kirton	C	10	1	1	2	6	-1	0	0	0
Larry Trader	D	15	0	2	2	6	-9	0	0	0
Corrado Micalef	G	34	0	1	1	18	0	0	0	0
Dennis Polonich	C/RW	11	0	1	1	0	-4	0	0	0
Bobby Crawford	RW	1	0	0	0	0	0	0	0	0
Greg Joly	D	2	0	0	0	0	0	0	0	0
Jim Rutherford	G	1	0	0	0	0	0	0	0	0
Brad Smith	RW	1	0	0	0	0	-1	0	0	0
Ken Solheim	LW	10	0	0	0	2	-2	0	0	0
Greg Stefan	G	35	0	0	0	35	0	0	0	0

Goaltending

Player	MIN	GP	W	L	T	GA	GAA	SO
Corrado Micalef	1756	34	11	13	5	106	3.62	2
Greg Stefan	1847	35	6	16	9	139	4.52	0
Gilles Gilbert	1137	20	4	14	1	85	4.49	0
Jim Rutherford	60	1	0	1	0	7	7.00	0
Team:	4800	80	21	44	15	337	4.21	2

Note: GP = Games played; G = Goals; A = Assists; Pts = Points; +/- = Plus-minus PIM = Penalty minutes; PPG = Power-play goals; SHG = Short-handed goals; GWG = Game-winning goals;
MIN = Minutes played; W = Wins; L = Losses; T = Ties; GA = Goals against; GAA = Goals-against average; SO = Shutouts;

== Draft picks ==
Detroit's draft picks at the 1982 NHL entry draft held at the Montreal Forum in Montreal.

Round	#	Player	Nationality	College/Junior/Club team (League)
1	17	Murray Craven	Canada	Medicine Hat Tigers (WHL)
2	23	Yves Courteau	Canada	Laval Voisins (QMJHL)
3	44	Carmine Vani	Canada	Kingston Canadians (OHL)
4	66	Craig Coxe	United States	St. Albert Saints (AJHL)
5	86	Brad Shaw	Canada	Ottawa 67's (OHL)
6	107	Claude Vilgrain	Canada	Laval Voisons (QMJHL)
7	128	Greg Hudas	United States	Redford Royals (NAJHL)
8	149	Pat Lahey	Canada	Windsor Spitfires (OHL)
9	170	Gary Cullen	Canada	Cornell University (ECAC)
10	191	Brent Meckling	Canada	Calgary Canucks (AJHL)
11	212	Mike Stern	Canada	Oshawa Generals (OHL)
12	233	Shaun Reagan	Canada	Brantford Alexanders (OHL)

== See also ==
- 1982–83 NHL season
