= 1982–83 Chicago Black Hawks season =

National Hockey League team season

1982–83 Chicago Black Hawks
- Norris Division champions
- Division: 1st Norris
- Conference: 2nd Campbell
- 1982–83 record: 47–23–10
- Home record: 29–8–3
- Road record: 18–15–7
- Goals for: 338
- Goals against: 268

Team information
- General manager: Bob Pulford
- Coach: Orval Tessier
- Captain: Darryl Sutter
- Alternate captains: None
- Arena: Chicago Stadium

Team leaders
- Goals: Al Secord (54)
- Assists: Denis Savard (86)
- Points: Denis Savard (121)
- Penalty minutes: Al Secord (180)
- Plus/minus: Steve Larmer (44)
- Wins: Murray Bannerman (24)
- Goals against average: Murray Bannerman (3.10)

The 1982–83 Chicago Black Hawks season was the 57th season of operation of the Chicago Black Hawks in the National Hockey League (NHL).

== Offseason ==
During the off-season, the Black Hawks hired Orval Tessier to become the head coach of the club. Tessier spent parts of three seasons playing in the NHL with the Montreal Canadiens and Boston Bruins from 1954 to 1961. As a head coach, Tessier led the Cornwall Royals to the 1972 Memorial Cup championship, and also led the Kitchener Rangers to the 1981 Memorial Cup final. Tessier then led the New Brunswick Hawks to the 1981–82 Calder Cup. This would be Tessier's first NHL head coaching job.

At the 1982 NHL entry draft, the Black Hawks selected Ken Yaremchuk with their first-round draft pick, seventh overall. Yaremchuk played with the Portland Winter Hawks of the WHL in 1981–82, scoring 58 goals and 157 points in 72 games.

The club also named Darryl Sutter as the new team captain, as former captain Terry Ruskowski was traded to the Los Angeles Kings.

With the Colorado Rockies relocating to East Rutherford, New Jersey and becoming the New Jersey Devils, the NHL made a minor realignment of the divisions. The Devils moved from the Smythe Division to the Patrick Division, while the Winnipeg Jets moved from the Norris Division into the Smythe Division.

== Regular season ==
The Black Hawks got off to a quick start, as through their first 25 games, Chicago had a league best record of 17–3–5, earning 39 points. The club continued their torrid pace, as they had a 25–6–6 record through their first 37 games before going into a slump where they lost five of their next seven games. Chicago would attempt to strengthen their club, acquiring Curt Fraser from the Vancouver Canucks for former first-round draft pick Tony Tanti. The Black Hawks continued their winning ways, and finished the season with a 47–23–10 record, earning 104 points, and finishing in first place in the Norris Division, fourth overall in the NHL. This marked the first time since 1973–74 that the Hawks finished with over 100 points.

Offensively, Chicago was led by Denis Savard, who scored 35 goals and a club record 121 points. Steve Larmer had a breakout season, scoring 43 goals and 90 points, while finishing with a team high +44 rating. Al Secord scored a team high 54 goals, and finished with 86 points, as well as leading the team with 180 penalty minutes. Darryl Sutter reached the 30 goal plateau for the second time in his career, as he finished with 31 goals and 61 points. On defence, Doug Wilson led the way, scoring 18 goals and 69 points, while Doug Crossman had 13 goals and 53 points.

In goal, Murray Bannerman appeared in 41 games, going 24-12-5 with a 3.10 GAA, while earning four shutouts. Tony Esposito split time with him, playing in 39 games, going 23-11-5 with a 3.46 GAA and one shutout.

=== Final standings ===
Norris Division
| | GP | W | L | T | GF | GA | Pts |
|---|---|---|---|---|---|---|---|
| **Chicago Black Hawks** | 80 | 47 | 23 | 10 | 338 | 268 | 104 |
| **Minnesota North Stars** | 80 | 40 | 24 | 16 | 321 | 290 | 96 |
| **Toronto Maple Leafs** | 80 | 28 | 40 | 12 | 293 | 330 | 68 |
| **St. Louis Blues** | 80 | 25 | 40 | 15 | 285 | 316 | 65 |
| Detroit Red Wings | 80 | 21 | 44 | 15 | 263 | 344 | 57 |

Note: GP = Games played, W = Wins, L = Losses, T = Ties, Pts = Points, GF = Goals for, GA = Goals against
Note: Teams that qualified for the playoffs are highlighted in bold.

=== Record vs. opponents ===
Norris Division record vs. opponents

==== Vs. Campbell Conference ====
**Vs. Norris Division**

1982–83 NHL records
| Team | **CHI** | **DET** | **MIN** | **STL** | **TOR** | **Total** |
|---|---|---|---|---|---|---|
| Chicago | — | 6−2 | 3−4−1 | 6−2 | 6−1−1 | **21−9−2** |
| Detroit | 2−6 | — | 0−6−2 | 1−5−2 | 4−4 | **7−21−4** |
| Minnesota | 4−3−1 | 6−0−2 | — | 3−0−5 | 3−5 | **16−8−8** |
| St. Louis | 2−6 | 5−1−2 | 0−3−5 | — | 3−3−2 | **10−13−9** |
| Toronto | 1−6−1 | 4−4 | 5−3 | 3−3−2 | — | **13−16−3** |

**Vs. Smythe Division**

1982–83 NHL records
| Team | **CGY** | **EDM** | **LAK** | **VAN** | **WIN** | **Total** |
|---|---|---|---|---|---|---|
| Chicago | 1−2 | 1−1−1 | 2−0−1 | 0−1−2 | 2−1 | **6−5−4** |
| Detroit | 1−2 | 1−2 | 0−1−2 | 1−1−1 | 0−3 | **3−9−3** |
| Minnesota | 1−1−1 | 1−2 | 2−1 | 2−0−1 | 3−0 | **9−4−2** |
| St. Louis | 1−2 | 0−2−1 | 2−1 | 0−3 | 1−2 | **4−10−1** |
| Toronto | 1−1−1 | 0−2−1 | 1−2 | 2−1 | 0−3 | **4−9−2** |

**Vs. Wales Conference**

**Vs. Adams Division**

1982–83 NHL records
| Team | **BOS** | **BUF** | **HFD** | **MTL** | **QUE** | **Total** |
|---|---|---|---|---|---|---|
| Chicago | 0−3 | 1−1−1 | 3−0 | 3−0 | 2−1 | **9−5−1** |
| Detroit | 0−3 | 1−1−1 | 3−0 | 0−1−2 | 1−1−1 | **5−6−4** |
| Minnesota | 0−3 | 2−0−1 | 2−0−1 | 0−3 | 1−2 | **5−8−2** |
| St. Louis | 0−3 | 1−2 | 2−1 | 0−2−1 | 1−1−1 | **4−9−2** |
| Toronto | 1−2 | 2−0−1 | 2−1 | 1−0−2 | 1−1−1 | **7−4−4** |

**Vs. Patrick Division**

1982–83 NHL records
| Team | **NJD** | **NYI** | **NYR** | **PHI** | **PIT** | **WSH** | **Total** |
|---|---|---|---|---|---|---|---|
| Chicago | 3−0 | 1−1−1 | 3−0 | 1−1−1 | 3−0 | 0−2−1 | **11−4−3** |
| Detroit | 1−1−1 | 2−0−1 | 0−2−1 | 0−3 | 2−0−1 | 1−2 | **6−8−4** |
| Minnesota | 3−0 | 2−0−1 | 1−2 | 1−1−1 | 2−0−1 | 1−1−1 | **10−4−4** |
| St. Louis | 2−0−1 | 1−2 | 0−2−1 | 0−3 | 3−0 | 1−1−1 | **7−8−3** |
| Toronto | 0−1−2 | 1−2 | 0−3 | 0−2−1 | 2−1 | 1−2 | **4−11−3** |

== Playoffs ==
=== Chicago Black Hawks 3, St. Louis Blues 1 ===
The Black Hawks opened the playoffs with a best-of-five Norris Division semifinal series against the St. Louis Blues, who finished the season with a 25–40–15 record, earning 65 points, which was 39 fewer than the Black Hawks. Chicago eliminated the Blues in the 1982 NHL Playoffs. The series opened with two games at Chicago Stadium, and with the Black Hawks taking a 2–0 lead into the third period, the Blues stunned Chicago, scoring four unanswered goals, winning the series opener by a 4–2 score. The Black Hawks rebounded in the second game, led by Denis Savard and his two goals in a 7–2 blowout victory to tie the series up at 1-1. The series shifted to The Checkerdome in St. Louis, Missouri for the next two games, and the Black Hawks, who scored two first period goals, were able to hold off the Blues for a close 2–1 victory in the third game of the series. Murray Bannerman made 25 saves as Chicago took the series lead. In the fourth game, Steve Larmer broke a 3–3 tie midway through the third period, while Darryl Sutter scored an empty netter to clinch the series for the Black Hawks, defeating the Blues 5–3 in the game, and 3–1 in the series.

=== Chicago Black Hawks 4, Minnesota North Stars 1 ===
In the best-of-seven Norris Division finals, the Black Hawks faced the Minnesota North Stars, who finished second in the division with a 40–24–16 record, earning 96 points, eight fewer than Chicago. In the first round of the playoffs, the North Stars defeated the Toronto Maple Leafs in four games. In the 1982 Stanley Cup playoffs, the Black Hawks eliminated Minnesota in the first round. The series opened with two games at Chicago Stadium, and in the series opener, the two teams were tied at 2–2 after the second period. In the third, the Black Hawks' Curt Fraser broke the tie with just under seven minutes remaining, followed by a goal by Denis Savard and an empty-net goal by Doug Wilson to win the game 5–2 and take the early series lead. In the second game, the Black Hawks were paced by Denis Savard and Steve Larmer, who each recorded four-point games, to defeat the North Stars 7–4 and send the series to Minnesota up 2–0. The next two games were played at the Met Center in Bloomington, Minnesota, and the North Stars, led by three points by Brad Maxwell and 23 saves by Gilles Meloche, cut the Black Hawks lead in half with a 5–1 victory. In the fourth game, Minnesota took a 3–0 lead midway through the second period before Chicago responded with three goals, two by Tom Lysiak, to send the game into overtime. In the extra period, the Black Hawks' Rich Preston was the hero, as Chicago completed the comeback, defeating the North Stars 4–3, and taking a 3–1 series lead back to Chicago. In the fifth game, the Black Hawks, who had two shorthanded goals, defeated the North Stars, 5–2, winning the series four games to one.

=== Edmonton Oilers 4, Chicago Black Hawks 0 ===
The Black Hawks advanced to the Campbell Conference finals for the second consecutive year, this time facing the Edmonton Oilers. Edmonton finished the season with a 47–21–12 record, earning 106 points, two more than the Hawks. In the post-season, the Oilers swept the Winnipeg Jets in the first round, and defeated the Calgary Flames in five games in the Smythe Division finals. The series opened with two games at Northlands Coliseum in Edmonton, Alberta, and the Oilers, led by a five-point game from Wayne Gretzky, easily defeated the Black Hawks 8–4 to take the first game of the series. In the second game, the Oilers continued their dominance, as Glenn Anderson had four goals, while Mark Messier had three, leading Edmonton to an 8–2 win. The series shifted to Chicago Stadium for the next two games, and Edmonton held a 2–0 lead after two periods in the third game. Chicago responded with goals by Steve Larmer and Denis Savard to tie the game, however, the Oilers Glenn Anderson broke the tie late in the third, leading Edmonton to a 3–2 victory, as the Oilers took a 3–0 series lead. Edmonton stormed out of the gate in the fourth game, taking an early 4–0 lead, as they coasted to a 6–3 victory, sweeping the Black Hawks out of the playoffs.

== Schedule and results ==
=== Regular season ===
1982–83 regular season
October

| Game | Result | Date | Score | Opponent | Record |
|---|---|---|---|---|---|
| 1 | T | October 6, 1982 | 3–3 | Toronto Maple Leafs (1982–83) | 0–0–1 |
| 2 | W | October 9, 1982 | 8–7 | @ Montreal Canadiens (1982–83) | 1–0–1 |
| 3 | L | October 10, 1982 | 3–5 | Winnipeg Jets (1982–83) | 1–1–1 |
| 4 | W | October 13, 1982 | 6–4 | St. Louis Blues (1982–83) | 2–1–1 |
| 5 | W | October 16, 1982 | 3–2 | @ Toronto Maple Leafs (1982–83) | 3–1–1 |
| 6 | W | October 17, 1982 | 6–4 | Detroit Red Wings (1982–83) | 4–1–1 |
| 7 | W | October 20, 1982 | 4–0 | Buffalo Sabres (1982–83) | 5–1–1 |
| 8 | L | October 23, 1982 | 4–5 | @ St. Louis Blues (1982–83) | 5–2–1 |
| 9 | W | October 24, 1982 | 4–2 | New York Islanders (1982–83) | 6–2–1 |
| 10 | T | October 27, 1982 | 4–4 | @ Edmonton Oilers (1982–83) | 6–2–2 |
| 11 | T | October 29, 1982 | 2–2 | @ Vancouver Canucks (1982–83) | 6–2–3 |
| 12 | T | October 30, 1982 | 5–5 | @ Los Angeles Kings (1982–83) | 6–2–4 |

November

| Game | Result | Date | Score | Opponent | Record |
|---|---|---|---|---|---|
| 13 | T | November 3, 1982 | 3–3 | Washington Capitals (1982–83) | 6–2–5 |
| 14 | W | November 7, 1982 | 7–3 | Toronto Maple Leafs (1982–83) | 7–2–5 |
| 15 | W | November 10, 1982 | 6–3 | Montreal Canadiens (1982–83) | 8–2–5 |
| 16 | W | November 13, 1982 | 3–2 | @ Detroit Red Wings (1982–83) | 9–2–5 |
| 17 | W | November 14, 1982 | 5–4 | Minnesota North Stars (1982–83) | 10–2–5 |
| 18 | W | November 17, 1982 | 5–3 | New Jersey Devils (1982–83) | 11–2–5 |
| 19 | L | November 20, 1982 | 4–5 | @ New York Islanders (1982–83) | 11–3–5 |
| 20 | W | November 21, 1982 | 3–0 | Detroit Red Wings (1982–83) | 12–3–5 |
| 21 | W | November 24, 1982 | 7–5 | @ Winnipeg Jets (1982–83) | 13–3–5 |
| 22 | W | November 26, 1982 | 4–3 | @ Hartford Whalers (1982–83) | 14–3–5 |
| 23 | W | November 27, 1982 | 3–1 | @ Quebec Nordiques (1982–83) | 15–3–5 |
| 24 | W | November 29, 1982 | 3–1 | @ New Jersey Devils (1982–83) | 16–3–5 |

December

| Game | Result | Date | Score | Opponent | Record |
|---|---|---|---|---|---|
| 25 | W | December 1, 1982 | 4–2 | @ Pittsburgh Penguins (1982–83) | 17–3–5 |
| 26 | L | December 4, 1982 | 2–4 | @ Washington Capitals (1982–83) | 17–4–5 |
| 27 | T | December 5, 1982 | 3–3 | @ Buffalo Sabres (1982–83) | 17–4–6 |
| 28 | W | December 8, 1982 | 7–2 | New York Rangers (1982–83) | 18–4–6 |
| 29 | L | December 11, 1982 | 2–4 | @ Boston Bruins (1982–83) | 18–5–6 |
| 30 | W | December 12, 1982 | 7–3 | Quebec Nordiques (1982–83) | 19–5–6 |
| 31 | W | December 15, 1982 | 10–3 | Winnipeg Jets (1982–83) | 20–5–6 |
| 32 | W | December 18, 1982 | 8–5 | @ Toronto Maple Leafs (1982–83) | 21–5–6 |
| 33 | W | December 19, 1982 | 6–4 | Los Angeles Kings (1982–83) | 22–5–6 |
| 34 | W | December 22, 1982 | 4–3 | Toronto Maple Leafs (1982–83) | 23–5–6 |
| 35 | W | December 26, 1982 | 7–4 | St. Louis Blues (1982–83) | 24–5–6 |
| 36 | L | December 28, 1982 | 2–3 | @ Calgary Flames (1982–83) | 24–6–6 |
| 37 | W | December 29, 1982 | 8–6 | @ Edmonton Oilers (1982–83) | 25–6–6 |
| 38 | L | December 31, 1982 | 1–4 | @ Detroit Red Wings (1982–83) | 25–7–6 |

January

| Game | Result | Date | Score | Opponent | Record |
|---|---|---|---|---|---|
| 39 | L | January 2, 1983 | 1–3 | Philadelphia Flyers (1982–83) | 25–8–6 |
| 40 | W | January 4, 1983 | 4–2 | @ St. Louis Blues (1982–83) | 26–8–6 |
| 41 | L | January 5, 1983 | 1–4 | Boston Bruins (1982–83) | 26–9–6 |
| 42 | L | January 8, 1983 | 1–4 | @ Minnesota North Stars (1982–83) | 26–10–6 |
| 43 | W | January 9, 1983 | 6–3 | Minnesota North Stars (1982–83) | 27–10–6 |
| 44 | L | January 12, 1983 | 4–10 | Edmonton Oilers (1982–83) | 27–11–6 |
| 45 | T | January 15, 1983 | 4–4 | @ Philadelphia Flyers (1982–83) | 27–11–7 |
| 46 | W | January 16, 1983 | 4–2 | Detroit Red Wings (1982–83) | 28–11–7 |
| 47 | L | January 19, 1983 | 4–6 | Washington Capitals (1982–83) | 28–12–7 |
| 48 | W | January 22, 1983 | 3–2 | @ Toronto Maple Leafs (1982–83) | 29–12–7 |
| 49 | W | January 23, 1983 | 4–2 | Hartford Whalers (1982–83) | 30–12–7 |
| 50 | L | January 26, 1983 | 1–5 | Vancouver Canucks (1982–83) | 30–13–7 |
| 51 | L | January 28, 1983 | 2–6 | @ Buffalo Sabres (1982–83) | 30–14–7 |
| 52 | W | January 30, 1983 | 5–4 | @ New York Rangers (1982–83) | 31–14–7 |

February

| Game | Result | Date | Score | Opponent | Record |
|---|---|---|---|---|---|
| 53 | W | February 1, 1983 | 5–0 | @ St. Louis Blues (1982–83) | 32–14–7 |
| 54 | W | February 2, 1983 | 7–4 | Pittsburgh Penguins (1982–83) | 33–14–7 |
| 55 | W | February 5, 1983 | 4–3 | @ Detroit Red Wings (1982–83) | 34–14–7 |
| 56 | W | February 6, 1983 | 4–1 | New York Rangers (1982–83) | 35–14–7 |
| 57 | W | February 9, 1983 | 5–4 | New Jersey Devils (1982–83) | 36–14–7 |
| 58 | L | February 12, 1983 | 4–5 | @ Minnesota North Stars (1982–83) | 36–15–7 |
| 59 | L | February 13, 1983 | 4–5 | Quebec Nordiques (1982–83) | 36–16–7 |
| 60 | W | February 16, 1983 | 5–3 | Calgary Flames (1982–83) | 37–16–7 |
| 61 | W | February 19, 1983 | 4–2 | @ Hartford Whalers (1982–83) | 38–16–7 |
| 62 | T | February 23, 1983 | 4–4 | New York Islanders (1982–83) | 38–16–8 |
| 63 | T | February 26, 1983 | 4–4 | @ Minnesota North Stars (1982–83) | 38–16–9 |
| 64 | L | February 27, 1983 | 1–2 | Minnesota North Stars (1982–83) | 38–17–9 |

March

| Game | Result | Date | Score | Opponent | Record |
|---|---|---|---|---|---|
| 65 | W | March 2, 1983 | 5–3 | Los Angeles Kings (1982–83) | 39–17–9 |
| 66 | L | March 5, 1983 | 3–6 | @ Boston Bruins (1982–83) | 39–18–9 |
| 67 | W | March 6, 1983 | 5–4 | Montreal Canadiens (1982–83) | 40–18–9 |
| 68 | W | March 8, 1983 | 4–1 | @ Philadelphia Flyers (1982–83) | 41–18–9 |
| 69 | L | March 10, 1983 | 2–4 | @ Detroit Red Wings (1982–83) | 41–19–9 |
| 70 | L | March 12, 1983 | 2–4 | @ Toronto Maple Leafs (1982–83) | 41–20–9 |
| 71 | W | March 13, 1983 | 4–3 | @ Pittsburgh Penguins (1982–83) | 42–20–9 |
| 72 | W | March 16, 1983 | 4–1 | St. Louis Blues (1982–83) | 43–20–9 |
| 73 | W | March 20, 1983 | 7–3 | Toronto Maple Leafs (1982–83) | 44–20–9 |
| 74 | L | March 21, 1983 | 3–4 | @ Minnesota North Stars (1982–83) | 44–21–9 |
| 75 | L | March 24, 1983 | 5–6 | @ Calgary Flames (1982–83) | 44–22–9 |
| 76 | T | March 25, 1983 | 3–3 | @ Vancouver Canucks (1982–83) | 44–22–10 |
| 77 | W | March 27, 1983 | 6–0 | Detroit Red Wings (1982–83) | 45–22–10 |
| 78 | W | March 30, 1983 | 5–0 | Minnesota North Stars (1982–83) | 46–22–10 |

April

| Game | Result | Date | Score | Opponent | Record |
|---|---|---|---|---|---|
| 79 | L | April 2, 1983 | 2–4 | @ St. Louis Blues (1982–83) | 46–23–10 |
| 80 | W | April 3, 1983 | 7–2 | St. Louis Blues (1982–83) | 47–23–10 |

Legend: Win (2 points) Loss (0 points) Tie (1 point)

=== Playoffs ===
1983 Stanley Cup playoffs
Norris Division Semifinals vs. (N4) St. Louis Blues – Black Hawks win 3–1

| Game | Date | Visitor | Score | Home | Series |
|---|---|---|---|---|---|
| 1 | April 6 | St. Louis Blues | 4–2 | Chicago Black Hawks | 0–1 |
| 2 | April 7 | St. Louis Blues | 2–7 | Chicago Black Hawks | 1–1 |
| 3 | April 9 | Chicago Black Hawks | 2–1 | St. Louis Blues | 2–1 |
| 4 | April 10 | Chicago Black Hawks | 5–3 | St. Louis Blues | 3–1 |

Norris Division Finals vs. (N2) Minnesota North Stars – Black Hawks win 4–1

| Game | Date | Visitor | Score | Home | Series |
|---|---|---|---|---|---|
| 1 | April 14 | Minnesota North Stars | 2–5 | Chicago Black Hawks | 1–0 |
| 2 | April 15 | Minnesota North Stars | 4–7 | Chicago Black Hawks | 2–0 |
| 3 | April 17 | Chicago Black Hawks | 1–5 | Minnesota North Stars | 2–1 |
| 4 | April 18 | Chicago Black Hawks | 4–3 | Minnesota North Stars | 3–1 |
| 5 | April 20 | Minnesota North Stars | 2–5 | Chicago Black Hawks | 4–1 |

Campbell Conference Finals vs. (S1) Edmonton Oilers – Oilers win 4–0

| Game | Date | Visitor | Score | Home | Series |
|---|---|---|---|---|---|
| 1 | April 24 | Chicago Black Hawks | 4–8 | Edmonton Oilers | 0–1 |
| 2 | April 26 | Chicago Black Hawks | 2–8 | Edmonton Oilers | 0–2 |
| 3 | May 1 | Edmonton Oilers | 3–2 | Chicago Black Hawks | 0–3 |
| 4 | May 3 | Edmonton Oilers | 6–3 | Chicago Black Hawks | 0–4 |

Legend: Win Loss

== Player stats ==
=== Regular season ===
Scoring

| Player | Pos | GP | G | A | Pts | PIM | +/- | PPG | SHG | GWG |
|---|---|---|---|---|---|---|---|---|---|---|
| Denis Savard | C | 78 | 35 | 86 | 121 | 99 | 26 | 13 | 0 | 4 |
| Steve Larmer | RW | 80 | 43 | 47 | 90 | 28 | 44 | 13 | 0 | 9 |
| Al Secord | LW | 80 | 54 | 32 | 86 | 180 | 34 | 20 | 0 | 6 |
| Doug Wilson | D | 74 | 18 | 51 | 69 | 58 | 22 | 3 | 0 | 3 |
| Darryl Sutter | LW | 80 | 31 | 30 | 61 | 53 | 18 | 10 | 0 | 5 |
| Tom Lysiak | C | 61 | 23 | 38 | 61 | 27 | 13 | 6 | 0 | 4 |
| Rich Preston | RW | 79 | 25 | 28 | 53 | 64 | 14 | 4 | 0 | 2 |
| Doug Crossman | D | 80 | 13 | 40 | 53 | 46 | 21 | 6 | 0 | 1 |
| Bill Gardner | C | 77 | 15 | 25 | 40 | 12 | 10 | 2 | 0 | 2 |
| Bob Murray | D | 79 | 7 | 32 | 39 | 73 | 24 | 5 | 0 | 1 |
| Keith Brown | D | 50 | 4 | 27 | 31 | 20 | 8 | 2 | 0 | 0 |
| Steve Ludzik | C | 66 | 6 | 19 | 25 | 63 | 7 | 0 | 0 | 0 |
| Tim Higgins | RW | 64 | 14 | 9 | 23 | 63 | -4 | 0 | 0 | 2 |
| Rick Paterson | C | 79 | 14 | 9 | 23 | 14 | -1 | 1 | 3 | 2 |
| Peter Marsh | RW | 68 | 6 | 14 | 20 | 55 | -8 | 0 | 0 | 2 |
| Curt Fraser | LW | 38 | 6 | 13 | 19 | 77 | 2 | 0 | 0 | 2 |
| Dave Feamster | D | 78 | 6 | 12 | 18 | 69 | 15 | 0 | 0 | 0 |
| Troy Murray | C | 54 | 8 | 8 | 16 | 27 | -4 | 1 | 0 | 2 |
| Denis Cyr | RW | 41 | 7 | 8 | 15 | 2 | 6 | 0 | 0 | 0 |
| Greg Fox | D | 76 | 0 | 12 | 12 | 81 | 11 | 0 | 0 | 0 |
| Jack O'Callahan | D | 39 | 0 | 11 | 11 | 46 | 9 | 0 | 0 | 0 |
| Mike Fidler | LW | 4 | 2 | 1 | 3 | 4 | -1 | 0 | 0 | 0 |
| Terry Ruskowski | C | 5 | 0 | 2 | 2 | 12 | 0 | 0 | 0 | 0 |
| Tony Tanti | RW | 1 | 1 | 0 | 1 | 0 | 0 | 0 | 0 | 0 |
| Murray Bannerman | G | 41 | 0 | 1 | 1 | 2 | 0 | 0 | 0 | 0 |
| Jerome Dupont | D | 1 | 0 | 0 | 0 | 0 | 0 | 0 | 0 | 0 |
| Tony Esposito | G | 39 | 0 | 0 | 0 | 0 | 0 | 0 | 0 | 0 |
| Grant Mulvey | RW | 3 | 0 | 0 | 0 | 0 | 0 | 0 | 0 | 0 |

Goaltending

| Player | MIN | GP | W | L | T | GA | GAA | SO |
|---|---|---|---|---|---|---|---|---|
| Murray Bannerman | 2460 | 41 | 24 | 12 | 5 | 127 | 3.10 | 4 |
| Tony Esposito | 2340 | 39 | 23 | 11 | 5 | 135 | 3.46 | 1 |
| Team: | 4800 | 80 | 47 | 23 | 10 | 262 | 3.27 | 5 |

=== Playoffs ===
Scoring

| Player | Pos | GP | G | A | Pts | PIM | PPG | SHG | GWG |
|---|---|---|---|---|---|---|---|---|---|
| Denis Savard | C | 13 | 8 | 9 | 17 | 22 | 3 | 0 | 1 |
| Doug Wilson | D | 13 | 4 | 11 | 15 | 12 | 0 | 1 | 0 |
| Tom Lysiak | C | 13 | 6 | 7 | 13 | 8 | 2 | 0 | 2 |
| Steve Larmer | RW | 11 | 5 | 7 | 12 | 8 | 2 | 0 | 1 |
| Al Secord | LW | 12 | 4 | 7 | 11 | 66 | 1 | 0 | 0 |
| Darryl Sutter | LW | 13 | 4 | 6 | 10 | 8 | 0 | 0 | 0 |
| Doug Crossman | D | 13 | 3 | 7 | 10 | 6 | 1 | 0 | 0 |
| Rich Preston | RW | 13 | 2 | 7 | 9 | 25 | 0 | 0 | 1 |
| Curt Fraser | LW | 13 | 4 | 4 | 8 | 18 | 1 | 0 | 1 |
| Steve Ludzik | C | 13 | 3 | 5 | 8 | 20 | 0 | 0 | 0 |
| Bob Murray | D | 13 | 2 | 3 | 5 | 10 | 1 | 0 | 0 |
| Tim Higgins | RW | 13 | 1 | 3 | 4 | 10 | 0 | 0 | 0 |
| Greg Fox | D | 13 | 0 | 3 | 3 | 22 | 0 | 0 | 0 |
| Rick Paterson | C | 13 | 1 | 1 | 2 | 4 | 0 | 1 | 1 |
| Peter Marsh | RW | 12 | 0 | 2 | 2 | 0 | 0 | 0 | 0 |
| Jack O'Callahan | D | 5 | 0 | 2 | 2 | 2 | 0 | 0 | 0 |
| Dave Feamster | D | 13 | 1 | 0 | 1 | 4 | 0 | 0 | 0 |
| Bill Gardner | C | 13 | 1 | 0 | 1 | 9 | 1 | 0 | 0 |
| Murray Bannerman | G | 8 | 0 | 1 | 1 | 0 | 0 | 0 | 0 |
| Keith Brown | D | 7 | 0 | 0 | 0 | 11 | 0 | 0 | 0 |
| Denis Cyr | RW | 1 | 0 | 0 | 0 | 0 | 0 | 0 | 0 |
| Tony Esposito | G | 5 | 0 | 0 | 0 | 0 | 0 | 0 | 0 |
| Troy Murray | C | 2 | 0 | 0 | 0 | 0 | 0 | 0 | 0 |

Goaltending

| Player | MIN | GP | W | L | GA | GAA | SO |
|---|---|---|---|---|---|---|---|
| Murray Bannerman | 480 | 8 | 4 | 4 | 32 | 4.00 | 0 |
| Tony Esposito | 311 | 5 | 3 | 2 | 18 | 3.47 | 0 |
| Team: | 791 | 13 | 7 | 6 | 50 | 3.79 | 0 |

Note: Pos = Position; GP = Games played; G = Goals; A = Assists; Pts = Points; +/- = plus/minus; PIM = Penalty minutes; PPG = Power-play goals; SHG = Short-handed goals; GWG = Game-winning goals
MIN = Minutes played; W = Wins; L = Losses; T = Ties; GA = Goals-against; GAA = Goals-against average; SO = Shutouts;

== Draft picks ==
Chicago's draft picks at the 1982 NHL entry draft held at the Montreal Forum in Montreal.

| Round | # | Player | Nationality | College/Junior/Club team (League) |
|---|---|---|---|---|
| 1 | 7 | Ken Yaremchuk | Canada | Portland Winter Hawks (WHL) |
| 2 | 28 | Rene Badeau | Canada | Quebec Remparts (QMJHL) |
| 3 | 49 | Tom McMurchy | Canada | Brandon Wheat Kings (WHL) |
| 4 | 70 | Bill Watson | Canada | Prince Albert Raiders (SJHL) |
| 5 | 91 | Brad Beck | Canada | Penticton Knights (BCJHL) |
| 6 | 112 | Mark Hatcher | United States | Niagara Falls Flyers (OHL) |
| 7 | 133 | Jay Ness | United States | Roseau High School (USHS-MN) |
| 8 | 154 | Jeff Smith | Canada | London Knights (OHL) |
| 9 | 175 | Phil Patterson | Canada | Ottawa 67's (OHL) |
| 10 | 196 | Jim Camazzola | Canada | Penticton Knights (BCJHL) |
| 11 | 217 | Mike James | Canada | Ottawa Generals (OHL) |
| 12 | 238 | Bob Andrea | Canada | Dartmouth Arrows (NSJHL) |

== See also ==
- 1982–83 NHL season
