= 1982–83 St. Louis Blues season =

National Hockey League team season

1982–83 St. Louis Blues
- Division: 4th Norris
- Conference: 9th Campbell
- 1982–83 record: 25–40–15
- Home record: 16–16–8
- Road record: 9–24–7
- Goals for: 285
- Goals against: 316

Team information
- General manager: Emile Francis
- Coach: Emile Francis; Barclay Plager
- Captain: Brian Sutter
- Alternate captains: None
- Arena: Checkerdome

Team leaders
- Goals: Brian Sutter (46)
- Assists: Bernie Federko (60)
- Points: Bernie Federko (84)
- Penalty minutes: Brian Sutter (254)
- Wins: Mike Liut (21)
- Goals against average: Mike Liut (3.72)

The 1982–83 St. Louis Blues season was the 16th in franchise history. It involved the team finishing the regular-season with a 25–40–15 record, with a total of 65 points, placing them fourth in the Norris Division. It ended with a Norris Division Semifinal loss to the Chicago Black Hawks in four games.

On January 12, Ralston Purina Company attempted to sell the club to Edmonton Oilers founder Bill Hunter, who had plans to move the team to Saskatoon, Saskatchewan. The NHL would eventually veto the deal, resulting in the team not participating in the entry draft. It would pave the way for Harry Ornest to purchase the franchise prior to the following season.

== Regular season ==
=== Final standings ===
Norris Division
	GP	W	L	T	GF	GA	Pts
**Chicago Black Hawks**	80	47	23	10	338	268	104
**Minnesota North Stars**	80	40	24	16	321	290	96
**Toronto Maple Leafs**	80	28	40	12	293	330	68
**St. Louis Blues**	80	25	40	15	285	316	65
Detroit Red Wings	80	21	44	15	263	344	57

Note: GP = Games played, W = Wins, L = Losses, T = Ties, Pts = Points, GF = Goals for, GA = Goals against
Note: Teams that qualified for the playoffs are highlighted in bold.

=== Record vs. opponents ===
Norris Division record vs. opponents

==== Vs. Campbell Conference ====
**Vs. Norris Division**

1982–83 NHL records
Team	**CHI**	**DET**	**MIN**	**STL**	**TOR**	**Total**
Chicago	—	6−2	3−4−1	6−2	6−1−1	**21−9−2**
Detroit	2−6	—	0−6−2	1−5−2	4−4	**7−21−4**
Minnesota	4−3−1	6−0−2	—	3−0−5	3−5	**16−8−8**
St. Louis	2−6	5−1−2	0−3−5	—	3−3−2	**10−13−9**
Toronto	1−6−1	4−4	5−3	3−3−2	—	**13−16−3**

**Vs. Smythe Division**

1982–83 NHL records
Team	**CGY**	**EDM**	**LAK**	**VAN**	**WIN**	**Total**
Chicago	1−2	1−1−1	2−0−1	0−1−2	2−1	**6−5−4**
Detroit	1−2	1−2	0−1−2	1−1−1	0−3	**3−9−3**
Minnesota	1−1−1	1−2	2−1	2−0−1	3−0	**9−4−2**
St. Louis	1−2	0−2−1	2−1	0−3	1−2	**4−10−1**
Toronto	1−1−1	0−2−1	1−2	2−1	0−3	**4−9−2**

**Vs. Wales Conference**

**Vs. Adams Division**

1982–83 NHL records
Team	**BOS**	**BUF**	**HFD**	**MTL**	**QUE**	**Total**
Chicago	0−3	1−1−1	3−0	3−0	2−1	**9−5−1**
Detroit	0−3	1−1−1	3−0	0−1−2	1−1−1	**5−6−4**
Minnesota	0−3	2−0−1	2−0−1	0−3	1−2	**5−8−2**
St. Louis	0−3	1−2	2−1	0−2−1	1−1−1	**4−9−2**
Toronto	1−2	2−0−1	2−1	1−0−2	1−1−1	**7−4−4**

**Vs. Patrick Division**

1982–83 NHL records
Team	**NJD**	**NYI**	**NYR**	**PHI**	**PIT**	**WSH**	**Total**
Chicago	3−0	1−1−1	3−0	1−1−1	3−0	0−2−1	**11−4−3**
Detroit	1−1−1	2−0−1	0−2−1	0−3	2−0−1	1−2	**6−8−4**
Minnesota	3−0	2−0−1	1−2	1−1−1	2−0−1	1−1−1	**10−4−4**
St. Louis	2−0−1	1−2	0−2−1	0−3	3−0	1−1−1	**7−8−3**
Toronto	0−1−2	1−2	0−3	0−2−1	2−1	1−2	**4−11−3**

== Schedule and results ==
1982–83 regular season
October

Game	Result	Date	Score	Opponent	Record
1	W	October 6, 1982	2–1	@ Detroit Red Wings (1982–83)	1–0–0
2	W	October 7, 1982	3–2	Toronto Maple Leafs (1982–83)	2–0–0
3	L	October 9, 1982	3–6	Minnesota North Stars (1982–83)	2–1–0
4	L	October 13, 1982	4–6	@ Chicago Black Hawks (1982–83)	2–2–0
5	L	October 14, 1982	2–5	Winnipeg Jets (1982–83)	2–3–0
6	W	October 16, 1982	6–0	Detroit Red Wings (1982–83)	3–3–0
7	L	October 18, 1982	3–4	@ Minnesota North Stars (1982–83)	3–4–0
8	W	October 20, 1982	5–3	@ Pittsburgh Penguins (1982–83)	4–4–0
9	W	October 23, 1982	5–4	Chicago Black Hawks (1982–83)	5–4–0
10	L	October 24, 1982	2–6	@ Buffalo Sabres (1982–83)	5–5–0
11	L	October 27, 1982	4–5	@ Detroit Red Wings (1982–83)	5–6–0
12	L	October 30, 1982	5–6	Washington Capitals (1982–83)	5–7–0

November

Game	Result	Date	Score	Opponent	Record
13	W	November 2, 1982	4–2	Detroit Red Wings (1982–83)	6–7–0
14	W	November 5, 1982	4–3	@ Washington Capitals (1982–83)	7–7–0
15	T	November 6, 1982	3–3	Toronto Maple Leafs (1982–83)	7–7–1
16	L	November 9, 1982	1–4	@ New York Islanders (1982–83)	7–8–1
17	L	November 10, 1982	4–5	@ New York Rangers (1982–83)	7–9–1
18	L	November 13, 1982	2–5	@ Hartford Whalers (1982–83)	7–10–1
19	L	November 14, 1982	3–7	@ Boston Bruins (1982–83)	7–11–1
20	W	November 16, 1982	7–2	New Jersey Devils (1982–83)	8–11–1
21	T	November 20, 1982	2–2	Detroit Red Wings (1982–83)	8–11–2
22	L	November 21, 1982	1–3	@ Philadelphia Flyers (1982–83)	8–12–2
23	T	November 23, 1982	1–1	Montreal Canadiens (1982–83)	8–12–3
24	L	November 26, 1982	6–8	@ Buffalo Sabres (1982–83)	8–13–3
25	W	November 27, 1982	5–3	Pittsburgh Penguins (1982–83)	9–13–3
26	L	November 30, 1982	2–3	New York Islanders (1982–83)	9–14–3

December

Game	Result	Date	Score	Opponent	Record
27	L	December 2, 1982	3–6	Minnesota North Stars (1982–83)	9–15–3
28	L	December 4, 1982	3–6	@ Los Angeles Kings (1982–83)	9–16–3
29	L	December 5, 1982	3–6	@ Vancouver Canucks (1982–83)	9–17–3
30	L	December 7, 1982	2–3	@ Edmonton Oilers (1982–83)	9–18–3
31	W	December 9, 1982	7–2	@ Calgary Flames (1982–83)	10–18–3
32	L	December 11, 1982	1–3	Vancouver Canucks (1982–83)	10–19–3
33	L	December 14, 1982	3–4	Winnipeg Jets (1982–83)	10–20–3
34	W	December 15, 1982	4–2	@ Toronto Maple Leafs (1982–83)	11–20–3
35	W	December 18, 1982	7–4	Hartford Whalers (1982–83)	12–20–3
36	T	December 21, 1982	5–5	@ Detroit Red Wings (1982–83)	12–20–4
37	W	December 23, 1982	7–3	Toronto Maple Leafs (1982–83)	13–20–4
38	L	December 26, 1982	4–7	@ Chicago Black Hawks (1982–83)	13–21–4
39	L	December 28, 1982	0–3	Boston Bruins (1982–83)	13–22–4
40	W	December 29, 1982	6–5	@ Pittsburgh Penguins (1982–83)	14–22–4

January

Game	Result	Date	Score	Opponent	Record
41	L	January 1, 1983	1–4	Philadelphia Flyers (1982–83)	14–23–4
42	L	January 4, 1983	2–4	Chicago Black Hawks (1982–83)	14–24–4
43	T	January 5, 1983	3–3	@ Minnesota North Stars (1982–83)	14–24–5
44	T	January 8, 1983	3–3	Washington Capitals (1982–83)	14–24–6
45	L	January 11, 1983	5–7	Edmonton Oilers (1982–83)	14–25–6
46	W	January 14, 1983	4–2	@ Winnipeg Jets (1982–83)	15–25–6
47	T	January 17, 1983	4–4	@ Toronto Maple Leafs (1982–83)	15–25–7
48	L	January 18, 1983	1–3	@ Quebec Nordiques (1982–83)	15–26–7
49	T	January 20, 1983	3–3	@ New Jersey Devils (1982–83)	15–26–8
50	L	January 22, 1983	6–7	Calgary Flames (1982–83)	15–27–8
51	T	January 25, 1983	4–4	Minnesota North Stars (1982–83)	15–27–9
52	T	January 27, 1983	3–3	@ Minnesota North Stars (1982–83)	15–27–10
53	W	January 29, 1983	4–2	Los Angeles Kings (1982–83)	16–27–10

February

Game	Result	Date	Score	Opponent	Record
54	L	February 1, 1983	0–5	Chicago Black Hawks (1982–83)	16–28–10
55	W	February 2, 1983	4–3	@ Detroit Red Wings (1982–83)	17–28–10
56	T	February 5, 1983	2–2	New York Rangers (1982–83)	17–28–11
57	L	February 10, 1983	2–5	@ Philadelphia Flyers (1982–83)	17–29–11
58	W	February 12, 1983	5–1	New Jersey Devils (1982–83)	18–29–11
59	W	February 14, 1983	6–4	Buffalo Sabres (1982–83)	19–29–11
60	L	February 16, 1983	3–6	@ Toronto Maple Leafs (1982–83)	19–30–11
61	L	February 17, 1983	3–6	Toronto Maple Leafs (1982–83)	19–31–11
62	T	February 19, 1983	4–4	Quebec Nordiques (1982–83)	19–31–12
63	L	February 22, 1983	3–6	@ Vancouver Canucks (1982–83)	19–32–12
64	T	February 25, 1983	5–5	@ Edmonton Oilers (1982–83)	19–32–13
65	L	February 26, 1983	2–7	@ Calgary Flames (1982–83)	19–33–13

March

Game	Result	Date	Score	Opponent	Record
66	W	March 1, 1983	7–2	Los Angeles Kings (1982–83)	20–33–13
67	T	March 2, 1983	4–4	@ Minnesota North Stars (1982–83)	20–33–14
68	L	March 5, 1983	5–6	Montreal Canadiens (1982–83)	20–34–14
69	W	March 8, 1983	6–0	New York Islanders (1982–83)	21–34–14
70	L	March 9, 1983	2–5	@ Toronto Maple Leafs (1982–83)	21–35–14
71	W	March 12, 1983	2–1	Detroit Red Wings (1982–83)	22–35–14
72	W	March 15, 1983	5–3	Quebec Nordiques (1982–83)	23–35–14
73	L	March 16, 1983	1–4	@ Chicago Black Hawks (1982–83)	23–36–14
74	T	March 19, 1983	3–3	Minnesota North Stars (1982–83)	23–36–15
75	W	March 22, 1983	4–1	@ Hartford Whalers (1982–83)	24–36–15
76	L	March 24, 1983	6–7	@ Boston Bruins (1982–83)	24–37–15
77	L	March 26, 1983	5–6	@ Montreal Canadiens (1982–83)	24–38–15
78	L	March 29, 1983	3–4	New York Rangers (1982–83)	24–39–15

April

Game	Result	Date	Score	Opponent	Record
79	W	April 2, 1983	4–2	Chicago Black Hawks (1982–83)	25–39–15
80	L	April 3, 1983	2–7	@ Chicago Black Hawks (1982–83)	25–40–15

Legend: Win (2 points) Loss (0 points) Tie (1 point)

== Player statistics ==
=== Regular season ===
Scoring

Player	Pos	GP	G	A	Pts	PIM	+/-	PPG	SHG	GWG
Bernie Federko	C	75	24	60	84	24	-10	9	0	1
Brian Sutter	LW	79	46	30	76	254	0	11	0	4
Jorgen Pettersson	LW	74	35	38	73	4	-10	7	3	4
Blake Dunlop	C	78	22	44	66	14	-6	8	0	2
Rob Ramage	D	78	16	35	51	193	-9	7	0	3
Perry Turnbull	C	79	32	15	47	172	-20	6	0	1
Joe Mullen	RW	49	17	30	47	6	-5	5	0	0
Wayne Babych	RW	71	16	23	39	62	-24	5	0	2
Alain Lemieux	C	42	9	25	34	18	-10	1	0	0
Guy Lapointe	D	54	3	23	26	43	-12	1	1	1
Mike Zuke	C	43	8	16	24	14	-3	0	0	1
Jack Brownschidle	D	72	1	22	23	30	-3	1	0	0
Larry Patey	C	67	9	12	21	80	-6	0	3	0
Mark Reeds	RW	20	5	14	19	6	8	0	0	1
Blair Chapman	RW	39	7	11	18	10	-8	3	0	1
Mike Crombeen	RW	80	6	11	17	20	-5	0	1	1
Andre Dore	D	38	2	15	17	25	9	0	0	0
Tim Bothwell	D	61	4	11	15	34	-8	0	1	1
Bob Crawford	RW	27	5	9	14	2	-5	1	0	0
Rik Wilson	D	56	3	11	14	50	-10	1	0	1
Vaclav Nedomansky	RW	22	2	9	11	2	-8	1	0	0
Jack Carlson	LW	54	6	1	7	58	-3	0	0	1
Perry Anderson	LW	18	5	2	7	14	-6	0	0	0
Ed Kea	D	46	0	5	5	24	-7	0	0	0
Alain Vigneault	D	28	1	3	4	39	-4	0	0	0
Ralph Klassen	C	29	0	2	2	6	-3	0	0	0
Jim Pavese	D	24	0	2	2	45	-11	0	0	0
Curt Brackenbury	RW	6	1	0	1	6	-8	0	0	0
Glen Hanlon	G	14	0	0	0	0	0	0	0	0
Gerry Hart	D	8	0	0	0	2	-3	0	0	0
Rick Heinz	G	9	0	0	0	2	0	0	0	0
Pat Hickey	LW	1	0	0	0	0	0	0	0	0
Mike Liut	G	68	0	0	0	2	0	0	0	0
Bill Stewart	D	7	0	0	0	8	-1	0	0	0
Rob Tudor	RW/C	2	0	0	0	0	0	0	0	0

Goaltending

Player	MIN	GP	W	L	T	GA	GAA	SO
Mike Liut	3794	68	21	27	13	235	3.72	1
Glen Hanlon	671	14	3	8	1	50	4.47	0
Rick Heinz	335	9	1	5	1	24	4.30	1
Team:	4800	80	25	40	15	309	3.86	2

=== Playoffs ===
Scoring

Player	Pos	GP	G	A	Pts	PIM	PPG	SHG	GWG
Bernie Federko	C	4	2	3	5	0	1	0	0
Brian Sutter	LW	4	2	1	3	10	2	0	0
Rob Ramage	D	4	0	3	3	22	0	0	0
Blake Dunlop	C	4	1	1	2	0	1	0	0
Jorgen Pettersson	LW	4	1	1	2	0	1	0	0
Larry Patey	C	4	1	0	1	4	0	0	0
Mark Reeds	RW	4	1	0	1	2	0	0	0
Perry Turnbull	C	4	1	0	1	14	0	0	0
Mike Zuke	C	4	1	0	1	4	0	0	1
Mike Crombeen	RW	4	0	1	1	4	0	0	0
Andre Dore	D	4	0	1	1	8	0	0	0
Guy Lapointe	D	4	0	1	1	9	0	0	0
Alain Lemieux	C	4	0	1	1	0	0	0	0
Alain Vigneault	D	4	0	1	1	26	0	0	0
Jack Brownschidle	D	4	0	0	0	2	0	0	0
Jack Carlson	LW	4	0	0	0	5	0	0	0
Bob Crawford	RW	4	0	0	0	0	0	0	0
Mike Liut	G	4	0	0	0	0	0	0	0
Jim Pavese	D	4	0	0	0	6	0	0	0

Goaltending

Player	MIN	GP	W	L	GA	GAA	SO
Mike Liut	240	4	1	3	15	3.75	0
Team:	240	4	1	3	15	3.75	0

Note:

Pos = Position;GP = Games played; G = Goals; A = Assists; Pts = Points; PIM = Penalty minutes; +/- = Plus/minus; PPG = Power-play goals; SHG = Short-handed goals; GWG = Game-winning goals
Pos = Position;GP = Games played; Min, TOI = Minutes played; W = Wins; L = Losses; T,T/OT = Ties; OTL = Overtime losses; GA = Goals-against; GAA = Goals-against average; SO = Shutouts; SA = Shots against; SV = Shots saved;SV% = Save percentage;

== Draft picks ==
St. Louis's draft picks at the 1982 NHL entry draft held at the Montreal Forum in Montreal.

Round	#	Player	Nationality	College/Junior/Club team (League)
3	50	Mike Posavad	Canada	Peterborough Petes (OHL)
5	92	Scott Machej	Canada	Calgary Wranglers (WHL)
6	113	Perry Ganchar	Canada	Saskatoon Blades (WHL)
7	134	Doug Gilmour	Canada	Cornwall Royals (OHL)
8	155	Chris Delaney	United States	Boston College (ECAC)
9	176	Matt Christensen	United States	Aurora-Hoyt Lakes High School (USHS-MN)
10	197	John Shumski	United States	Rennssaeler Polytechnic Institute (ECAC)
11	218	Brian Ahern	United States	Sibley High School (USHS-MN)
12	239	Peter Smith	United States	University of Maine (ECAC)

== See also ==
- 1982–83 NHL season
