= Rod Willard =

Canadian ice hockey player

- Born: May 1, 1960 (age 64); New Liskeard, Ontario, Canada
- Height: 5 ft 11 in (180 cm)
- Weight: 183 lb (83 kg; 13 st 1 lb)
- Position: Left wing
- Shot: Left
- Played for: Toronto Maple Leafs
- NHL draft: Undrafted
- Playing career: 1980–1985

Rod Stephen Willard (born May 1, 1960) is a Canadian retired professional ice hockey left winger who played in one National Hockey League game for the Toronto Maple Leafs during the 1982–83 NHL season, on November 17, 1982 against the New York Rangers. The rest of his career, which lasted from 1980 to 1985, was spent in the minor leagues.

== Career statistics ==
=== Regular season and playoffs ===
			Regular season					Playoffs
Season	Team	League	GP	G	A	Pts	PIM	GP	G	A	Pts	PIM
1977–78	Cornwall Royals	QMJHL	66	12	29	41	27	9	1	6	7	21
1978–79	Cornwall Royals	QMJHL	72	38	57	95	69	7	3	3	6	15
1979–80	Cornwall Royals	QMJHL	55	29	50	79	84	18	6	8	14	18
1979–80	Cornwall Royals	M-Cup	—	—	—	—	—	5	1	1	2	2
1980–81	Fort Wayne Komets	IHL	79	32	29	61	92	12	4	5	9	14
1980–81	Tulsa Oilers	CHL	4	0	0	0	0	—	—	—	—	—
1981–82	New Brunswick Hawks	AHL	72	18	17	35	88	15	4	2	6	13
1982–83	St. Catharines Saints	AHL	46	6	11	17	22	—	—	—	—	—
1982–83	Springfield Indians	AHL	33	16	8	24	41	—	—	—	—	—
1982–83	Toronto Maple Leafs	NHL	1	0	0	0	0	—	—	—	—	—
1983–84	Springfield Indians	AHL	76	17	19	36	76	—	—	—	—	—
1984–85	Kalamazoo Wings	IHL	10	2	1	3	16	—	—	—	—	—
1984–85	Fort Worth Komets	IHL	18	2	8	10	19	—	—	—	—	—
AHL totals			227	57	55	112	227	15	4	2	6	13
IHL totals			107	36	38	74	127	12	4	5	9	14
NHL totals			1	0	0	0	0	—	—	—	—	—

== See also ==
- List of players who played only one game in the NHL
