= Leigh Verstraete =

Canadian ice hockey player (1962–2023)

- Born: January 6, 1962 Pincher Creek, Alberta, Canada
- Died: August 7, 2023 (aged 61) Harmony, Alberta, Canada
- Height: 5 ft 11 in (180 cm)
- Weight: 185 lb (84 kg; 13 st 3 lb)
- Position: Right Wing
- Shot: Right
- Played for: Toronto Maple Leafs
- NHL draft: 192nd overall, 1982; Toronto Maple Leafs
- Playing career: 1982–1988

Leigh Verstraete (January 6, 1962 – August 7, 2023) was a Canadian professional ice hockey player who played eight games in the National Hockey League. He played with the Toronto Maple Leafs.

Verstraete died on August 7, 2023, at the age of 61.

Verstraete continued his studies after hockey graduating from the University of Calgary and worked as an account executive in the petroleum industry in Alberta.

== Career statistics ==
			Regular season					Playoffs
Season	Team	League	GP	G	A	Pts	PIM	GP	G	A	Pts	PIM
1978–79	Billings Bighorns	WHL	32	4	4	8	58	2	0	0	0	5
1979–80	Billings Bighorns	WHL	10	1	0	1	47	—	—	—	—	—
1979–80	Calgary Wranglers	WHL	56	12	14	26	168	7	2	2	4	23
1980–81	Calgary Wranglers	WHL	71	22	18	40	372	21	6	5	11	155
1981–82	Calgary Wranglers	WHL	49	19	20	39	385	8	4	4	8	43
1982–83	Calgary Wranglers	WHL	4	0	1	1	11	—	—	—	—	—
1982–83	St. Catharines Saints	AHL	61	5	3	8	221	—	—	—	—	—
1982–83	Toronto Maple Leafs	NHL	3	0	0	0	5	—	—	—	—	—
1983–84	Muskegon Mohawks	IHL	19	5	5	10	123	—	—	—	—	—
1983–84	St. Catharines Saints	AHL	51	0	7	7	183	—	—	—	—	—
1984–85	St. Catharines Saints	AHL	43	5	8	13	164	—	—	—	—	—
1984–85	Toronto Maple Leafs	NHL	2	0	0	0	0	—	—	—	—	—
1985–86	St. Catharines Saints	AHL	75	8	12	20	300	11	2	3	5	114
1986–87	Newmarket Saints	AHL	57	9	7	16	179	—	—	—	—	—
1987–88	Newmarket Saints	AHL	12	4	3	7	38	—	—	—	—	—
1987–88	Toronto Maple Leafs	NHL	3	0	1	1	9	—	—	—	—	—
NHL totals			8	0	1	1	14	—	—	—	—	—
AHL totals			299	31	40	71	1,085	11	2	3	5	114
