= Jim McTaggart =

Canadian ice hockey player

- Born: March 31, 1960 (age 65) Weyburn, Saskatchewan, Canada
- Height: 5 ft 11 in (180 cm)
- Weight: 197 lb (89 kg; 14 st 1 lb)
- Position: Defence
- Shot: Left
- Played for: Washington Capitals
- NHL draft: Undrafted
- Playing career: 1980–1988

James Robert McTaggart (born March 31, 1960) is a Canadian former professional ice hockey player who played for the Washington Capitals. He was originally signed as a free agent by the Capitals in 1979 and played parts of two seasons with the club. He was an assistant coach for the Seattle Thunderbirds through the 2012-13 season. McTaggart was born in Weyburn, Saskatchewan.

== Career statistics ==
			Regular season					Playoffs
Season	Team	League	GP	G	A	Pts	PIM	GP	G	A	Pts	PIM
1976–77	Swift Current Broncos	SJHL	47	5	29	34	97	—	—	—	—	—
1977–78	Saskatoon Blades	WCHL	65	7	20	27	221	—	—	—	—	—
1978–79	Saskatoon Blades	WHL	37	6	19	25	86	—	—	—	—	—
1978–79	Billings Bighorns	WHL	30	1	12	13	93	8	1	4	5	23
1979–80	Billings Bighorns	WHL	65	16	37	53	284	7	2	5	7	45
1979–80	Hershey Bears	AHL	—	—	—	—	—	9	0	0	0	23
1980–81	Washington Capitals	NHL	52	1	6	7	185	—	—	—	—	—
1980–81	Hershey Bears	AHL	23	2	1	3	81	—	—	—	—	—
1981–82	Washington Capitals	NHL	19	2	4	6	20	—	—	—	—	—
1981–82	Hershey Bears	AHL	57	3	12	15	190	5	0	3	3	2
1982–83	Wichita Wind	CHL	21	3	9	12	38	—	—	—	—	—
1982–83	Moncton Alpines	AHL	49	0	7	7	63	—	—	—	—	—
1983–84	Montana Magic	CHL	70	5	13	18	104	—	—	—	—	—
1987–88	Peterborough Pirates	BHL	28	9	24	33	92	—	—	—	—	—
NHL totals			71	3	10	13	205	—	—	—	—	—
AHL totals			129	5	20	25	334	14	0	3	3	25

== Awards ==
- WHL Second All-Star Team – 1980
