= 1982–83 Edmonton Oilers season =

NHL team season

1982–83 Edmonton Oilers
- Campbell Conference champions
- Smythe Division champions
- Division: 1st Smythe
- Conference: 1st Campbell
- 1982–83 record: 47–21–12
- Home record: 25–9–6
- Road record: 22–12–6
- Goals for: 424
- Goals against: 315

Team information
- General manager: Glen Sather
- Coach: Glen Sather
- Captain: Lee Fogolin
- Alternate captains: None
- Arena: Northlands Coliseum
- Average attendance: 17,495 (99.99%)
- Minor league affiliate: Moncton Alpines (AHL)

Team leaders
- Goals: Wayne Gretzky (71)
- Assists: Wayne Gretzky (125)
- Points: Wayne Gretzky (196)
- Penalty minutes: Laurie Boschman (183)
- Plus/minus: Charlie Huddy (+63)
- Wins: Andy Moog (33)
- Goals against average: Andy Moog (3.54)

The 1982–83 Edmonton Oilers season was the Oilers' fourth season in the National Hockey League (NHL) and their second-straight season of finishing with over 100 points, and they won the Smythe Division for the second straight season. The Oilers broke the NHL record for goals in a season with 424, breaking the record they set in the previous season. The Oilers made it to the Stanley Cup Final for the first time in franchise history, but lost to the three-time champion New York Islanders in a four-game sweep.

== Regular season ==
Wayne Gretzky had another amazing season, scoring 71 goals, while earning an NHL record 125 assists to finish the year with 196 points, winning his fourth Hart Trophy and his third Art Ross Trophy. The Oilers tied the Boston Bruins' 1971 record of four 100-point scorers, as Gretzky, Mark Messier, Glenn Anderson and Jari Kurri each passed the 100-point plateau during the season.

Andy Moog would step it up as the Oilers #1 goaltender, winning a team record 33 games, while posting a team best 3.53 GAA.

=== Season standings ===
Smythe Division
	GP	W	L	T	GF	GA	Pts
**Edmonton Oilers**	80	47	21	12	424	315	106
**Calgary Flames**	80	32	34	14	321	316	78
**Vancouver Canucks**	80	30	35	15	303	309	75
**Winnipeg Jets**	80	33	39	8	311	333	74
Los Angeles Kings	80	27	41	12	308	365	66

Note: GP = Games played, W = Wins, L = Losses, T = Ties, Pts = Points, GF = Goals for, GA = Goals against
Note: Teams that qualified for the playoffs are highlighted in bold.

=== Record vs. opponents ===
Smythe Division record vs. opponents

==== Vs. Campbell Conference ====
**Vs. Smythe Division**

1982–83 NHL records
Team	**CGY**	**EDM**	**LAK**	**VAN**	**WIN**	**Total**
Calgary	—	2−4−2	3−3−2	5−2−1	5−2−1	**15−11−6**
Edmonton	4−2−2	—	5−1−2	5−2−1	6−2	**20−7−5**
Los Angeles	3−3−2	1−5−2	—	3−3−2	2−6	**9−17−6**
Vancouver	2−5−1	2−5−1	3−3−2	—	4−3−1	**11−16−5**
Winnipeg	2−5−1	2−6	6−2	3−4−1	—	**13−17−2**

**Vs. Norris Division**

1982–83 NHL records
Team	**CHI**	**DET**	**MIN**	**STL**	**TOR**	**Total**
Calgary	2−1	2−1	1−1−1	2−1	1−1−1	**8−5−2**
Edmonton	1−1−1	2−1	2−1	2−0−1	2−0−1	**9−3−3**
Los Angeles	0−2−1	1−0−2	1−2	1−2	2−1	**5−7−3**
Vancouver	1−0−2	1−1−1	0−2−1	3−0	1−2	**6−5−4**
Winnipeg	1−2	3−0	0−3	2−1	3−0	**9−6−0**

**Vs. Wales Conference**

**Vs. Adams Division**

1982–83 NHL records
Team	**BOS**	**BUF**	**HFD**	**MTL**	**QUE**	**Total**
Calgary	0−2−1	1−2	1−0−2	1−2	0−2−1	**3−8−4**
Edmonton	0−2−1	2−1	2−0−1	2−1	1−1−1	**7−5−3**
Los Angeles	2−1	1−2	2−1	1−2	1−1−1	**7−7−1**
Vancouver	1−2	1−1−1	2−1	0−3	3−0	**7−7−1**
Winnipeg	2−0−1	1−2	1−1−1	0−3	1−2	**5−8−2**

**Vs. Patrick Division**

1982–83 NHL records
Team	**NJD**	**NYI**	**NYR**	**PHI**	**PIT**	**WSH**	**Total**
Calgary	2−1	0−2−1	0−2−1	0−3	3−0	1−2	**6−10−2**
Edmonton	3−0	0−3	3−0	1−2	2−1	2−0−1	**11−6−1**
Los Angeles	2−1	0−3	1−1−1	1−2	1−2	1−1−1	**6−10−2**
Vancouver	0−1−2	1−2	1−1–1	1−1−1	2−1	1−1−1	**6−7−5**
Winnipeg	2−1	1−1−1	1−1−1	0−3	2−1	0−1−2	**6−8−4**

== Schedule and results ==
1982–83 regular season
October: 4–6–3 (home: 3–3–1; road: 1–3–2)

Game	Date	Visitor	Score	Home	OT	Decision	Attendance	Record	Pts	Recap
1	October 5	Calgary Flames	5 – 7	Edmonton Oilers		Fuhr	17,498	1–0–0	2	
2	October 8	New York Islanders	6 – 4	Edmonton Oilers		Fuhr	17,498	1–1–0	2	
3	October 9	Edmonton Oilers	6 – 3	Vancouver Canucks		Moog	14,800	2–1–0	4	
4	October 12	Edmonton Oilers	4 – 9	Calgary Flames		Fuhr	7,242	2–2–0	4	
5	October 14	Edmonton Oilers	4 – 4	Hartford Whalers		Moog	10,894	2–2–1	5	
6	October 16	Edmonton Oilers	6 – 6	Boston Bruins		Moog	14,685	2–2–2	6	
7	October 17	Edmonton Oilers	4 – 6	Buffalo Sabres		Fuhr	13,990	2–3–2	6	
8	October 20	Hartford Whalers	2 – 4	Edmonton Oilers		Fuhr	17,498	3–3–2	8	
9	October 21	Boston Bruins	5 – 3	Edmonton Oilers		Fuhr	17,498	3–4–2	8	
10	October 24	Edmonton Oilers	5 – 9	Winnipeg Jets		Low	13,965	3–5–2	8	
11	October 27	Chicago Black Hawks	4 – 4	Edmonton Oilers		Moog	17,498	3–5–3	9	
12	October 29	Los Angeles Kings	3 – 6	Edmonton Oilers		Moog	17,495	4–5–3	11	
13	October 31	Vancouver Canucks	3 – 2	Edmonton Oilers		Moog	17,498	4–6–3	11	

November: 7–3–3 (home: 2–1–2; road: 5–2–1)

Game	Date	Visitor	Score	Home	OT	Decision	Attendance	Record	Pts	Recap
14	November 3	Winnipeg Jets	2 – 7	Edmonton Oilers		Moog	17,498	5–6–3	13	
15	November 5	New York Rangers	1 – 5	Edmonton Oilers		Moog	17,498	6–6–3	15	
16	November 8	Edmonton Oilers	5 – 5	Quebec Nordiques		Fuhr	15,221	6–6–4	16	
17	November 10	Edmonton Oilers	4 – 5	Pittsburgh Penguins		Moog	12,456	6–7–4	16	
18	November 11	Edmonton Oilers	5 – 1	New Jersey Devils		Fuhr	19,023	7–7–4	18	
19	November 13	Edmonton Oilers	4 – 3	Philadelphia Flyers		Moog	17,147	8–7–4	20	
20	November 14	Edmonton Oilers	7 – 2	New York Rangers		Fuhr	17,404	9–7–4	22	
21	November 16	Edmonton Oilers	2 – 4	New York Islanders		Fuhr	15,230	9–8–4	22	
22	November 20	Vancouver Canucks	3 – 3	Edmonton Oilers		Moog	17,498	9–8–5	23	
23	November 21	Quebec Nordiques	9 – 7	Edmonton Oilers		Fuhr	17,498	9–9–5	23	
24	November 24	Washington Capitals	3 – 3	Edmonton Oilers		Fuhr	17,498	9–9–6	24	
25	November 26	Edmonton Oilers	6 – 5	Winnipeg Jets		Moog	15,639	10–9–6	26	
26	November 28	Edmonton Oilers	7 – 5	Detroit Red Wings		Moog	18,094	11–9–6	28	

December: 8–3–2 (home: 6–2–0; road: 2–1–2)

Game	Date	Visitor	Score	Home	OT	Decision	Attendance	Record	Pts	Recap
27	December 1	Philadelphia Flyers	4 – 2	Edmonton Oilers		Moog	17,498	11–10–6	28	
28	December 4	Calgary Flames	5 – 7	Edmonton Oilers		Fuhr	17,498	12–10–6	30	
29	December 5	Los Angeles Kings	3 – 7	Edmonton Oilers		Moog	17,498	13–10–6	32	
30	December 7	St. Louis Blues	2 – 3	Edmonton Oilers		Fuhr	17,498	14–10–6	34	
31	December 9	Edmonton Oilers	3 – 3	Los Angeles Kings		Moog	13,865	14–10–7	35	
32	December 11	Edmonton Oilers	4 – 5	Minnesota North Stars		Fuhr	15,784	14–11–7	35	
33	December 17	New Jersey Devils	4 – 10	Edmonton Oilers		Moog	17,498	15–11–7	37	
34	December 19	Montreal Canadiens	2 – 5	Edmonton Oilers		Fuhr	17,498	16–11–7	39	
35	December 22	Minnesota North Stars	2 – 8	Edmonton Oilers		Fuhr	17,498	17–11–7	41	
36	December 23	Edmonton Oilers	6 – 2	Los Angeles Kings		Moog	12,713	18–11–7	43	
37	December 26	Edmonton Oilers	4 – 4	Calgary Flames		Fuhr	7,242	18–11–8	44	
38	December 29	Chicago Black Hawks	8 – 6	Edmonton Oilers		Fuhr	17,498	18–12–8	44	
39	December 31	Edmonton Oilers	8 – 1	Vancouver Canucks		Moog	16,413	19–12–8	46	

January: 10–3–2 (home: 5–2–1; road: 5–1–1)

Game	Date	Visitor	Score	Home	OT	Decision	Attendance	Record	Pts	Recap
40	January 1	Winnipeg Jets	3 – 5	Edmonton Oilers		Moog	17,498	20–12–8	48	
41	January 4	Edmonton Oilers	6 – 3	Calgary Flames		Fuhr	7,242	21–12–8	50	
42	January 5	Edmonton Oilers	8 – 3	Winnipeg Jets		Fuhr	14,825	22–12–8	52	
43	January 7	Pittsburgh Penguins	2 – 7	Edmonton Oilers		Moog	17,498	23–12–8	54	
44	January 9	Detroit Red Wings	4 – 3	Edmonton Oilers		Fuhr	17,498	23–13–8	54	
45	January 11	Edmonton Oilers	7 – 5	St. Louis Blues		Moog	15,743	24–13–8	56	
46	January 12	Edmonton Oilers	10 – 4	Chicago Black Hawks		Moog	18,852	25–13–8	58	
47	January 15	Edmonton Oilers	10 – 4	Minnesota North Stars		Moog	15,784	26–13–8	60	
48	January 18	Edmonton Oilers	3 – 3	Los Angeles Kings		Moog	14,754	26–13–9	61	
49	January 19	Vancouver Canucks	4 – 9	Edmonton Oilers		Moog	17,498	27–13–9	63	
50	January 22	Edmonton Oilers	3 – 4	Vancouver Canucks		Fuhr	16,108	27–14–9	63	
51	January 23	Los Angeles Kings	6 – 8	Edmonton Oilers		Moog	17,498	28–14–9	65	
52	January 26	Toronto Maple Leafs	6 – 6	Edmonton Oilers		Moog	17,498	28–14–10	66	
53	January 29	Calgary Flames	4 – 5	Edmonton Oilers		Moog	17,498	29–14–10	68	
54	January 30	New York Islanders	4 – 2	Edmonton Oilers		Moog	17,498	29–15–10	68	

February: 6–4–1 (home: 4–1–1; road: 2–3–0)

Game	Date	Visitor	Score	Home	OT	Decision	Attendance	Record	Pts	Recap
55	February 3	Los Angeles Kings	7 – 4	Edmonton Oilers		Moog	17,498	29–16–10	68	
56	February 4	Montreal Canadiens	3 – 7	Edmonton Oilers		Moog	17,498	30–16–10	70	
57	February 11	Quebec Nordiques	3 – 7	Edmonton Oilers		Moog	17,498	31–16–10	72	
58	February 14	Edmonton Oilers	2 – 4	Montreal Canadiens		Moog	18,194	31–17–10	74	
59	February 17	Edmonton Oilers	3 – 7	Philadelphia Flyers		Fuhr	17,147	31–18–10	74	
60	February 19	Edmonton Oilers	10 – 7	Pittsburgh Penguins		Moog	14,868	32–18–10	76	
61	February 20	Edmonton Oilers	5 – 4	Buffalo Sabres		Moog	15,894	33–18–10	78	
62	February 22	Edmonton Oilers	1 – 4	Calgary Flames		Moog	7,242	33–19–10	78	
63	February 23	Washington Capitals	3 – 6	Edmonton Oilers		Moog	17,498	34–19–10	80	
64	February 25	St. Louis Blues	5 – 5	Edmonton Oilers		Fuhr	17,498	34–19–11	81	
65	February 27	Winnipeg Jets	0 – 3	Edmonton Oilers		Moog	17,498	35–19–11	83	

March: 11–2–0 (home: 4–0–0; road: 7–2–0)

Game	Date	Visitor	Score	Home	OT	Decision	Attendance	Record	Pts	Recap
66	March 1	Edmonton Oilers	4 – 3	New Jersey Devils		Middlebrook	13,478	36–19–11	85	
67	March 2	Edmonton Oilers	5 – 3	Washington Capitals		Moog	18,130	37–19–11	85	
68	March 5	Edmonton Oilers	6 – 3	Toronto Maple Leafs		Fuhr	16,382	38–19–11	87	
69	March 6	Edmonton Oilers	2 – 5	Boston Bruins		Moog	14,685	38–20–11	87	
70	March 8	Edmonton Oilers	9 – 4	Hartford Whalers		Fuhr	11,863	39–20–11	89	
71	March 11	New York Rangers	1 – 3	Edmonton Oilers		Moog	17,498	40–20–11	91	
72	March 13	Buffalo Sabres	2 – 6	Edmonton Oilers		Moog	17,498	41–20–11	93	
73	March 16	Vancouver Canucks	3 – 4	Edmonton Oilers		Moog	17,498	42–20–11	95	
74	March 19	Detroit Red Wings	7 – 9	Edmonton Oilers		Moog	17,398	43–20–11	97	
75	March 21	Edmonton Oilers	4 – 1	Toronto Maple Leafs		Fuhr	16,382	44–20–11	99	
76	March 23	Edmonton Oilers	4 – 7	Winnipeg Jets		Fuhr	15,807	44–21–11	99	
77	March 26	Edmonton Oilers	9 – 3	Los Angeles Kings		Moog	16,005	45–21–11	101	
78	March 29	Edmonton Oilers	7 – 4	Vancouver Canucks		Fuhr	16,413	46–21–11	103	

April: 1–0–1 (home: 1–0–1; road: 0–0–0)

Game	Date	Visitor	Score	Home	OT	Decision	Attendance	Record	Pts	Recap
79	April 1	Winnipeg Jets	2 – 7	Edmonton Oilers		Moog	17,498	47–21–11	105	
80	April 3	Calgary Flames	3 – 3	Edmonton Oilers		Fuhr	17,498	47–21–12	106	

Legend: Win (2 points) Loss (0 points) Tie (1 point)

== Playoffs ==
In the playoffs, the Oilers would post an 11–1 record in the first 3 rounds, sweeping the Winnipeg Jets in 3 games, defeating the Calgary Flames in 5 games in the first ever Battle of Alberta in the playoffs, and sweep the Chicago Black Hawks in 4 games before facing the 3 time defending Stanley Cup Champions, the New York Islanders. The Islanders would make short work of the Oilers, sweeping Edmonton in 4 games, and winning their 4th straight Stanley Cup.

1983 Stanley Cup playoffs
Smythe Division Semifinals vs. (S4) Winnipeg Jets – Oilers win 3–0

Game	Date	Visitor	Score	Home	OT	Decision	Attendance	Series	Recap
1	April 6	Winnipeg Jets	3 – 6	Edmonton Oilers		Moog	17,498	1–0	
2	April 7	Winnipeg Jets	3 – 4	Edmonton Oilers		Moog	17,498	2–0	
3	April 9	Edmonton Oilers	4 – 3	Winnipeg Jets		Moog	11,346	3–0	

Smythe Division Finals vs. (S2) Calgary Flames – Oilers win 4–1

Game	Date	Visitor	Score	Home	OT	Decision	Attendance	Series	Recap
1	April 14	Calgary Flames	3 – 6	Edmonton Oilers		Moog	17,498	1–0	
2	April 15	Calgary Flames	1 – 5	Edmonton Oilers		Moog	17,498	2–0	
3	April 17	Edmonton Oilers	10 – 2	Calgary Flames		Moog	7,242	3–0	
4	April 18	Edmonton Oilers	5 – 6	Calgary Flames		Moog	7,242	3–1	
5	April 20	Calgary Flames	1 – 9	Edmonton Oilers		Moog	17,498	4–1	

Campbell Conference Finals vs. (N1) Chicago Black Hawks – Oilers win 4–0

Game	Date	Visitor	Score	Home	OT	Decision	Attendance	Series	Recap
1	April 24	Chicago Black Hawks	4 – 8	Edmonton Oilers		Moog	17,498	1–0	
2	April 26	Chicago Black Hawks	2 – 8	Edmonton Oilers		Moog	17,498	2–0	
3	May 1	Edmonton Oilers	3 – 2	Chicago Black Hawks		Moog	17,512	3–0	
4	May 3	Edmonton Oilers	6 – 3	Chicago Black Hawks		Moog	17,536	4–0	

Stanley Cup Final vs. (P2) New York Islanders – Islanders win 4–0

Game	Date	Visitor	Score	Home	OT	Decision	Attendance	Series	Recap
1	May 10	New York Islanders	2 – 0	Edmonton Oilers		Moog	17,498	0–1	
2	May 12	New York Islanders	6 – 3	Edmonton Oilers		Moog	17,498	0–2	
3	May 14	Edmonton Oilers	1 – 5	New York Islanders		Moog	15,317	0–3	
4	May 17	Edmonton Oilers	2 – 4	New York Islanders		Moog	15,317	0–4	

Legend: Win Loss

== Player statistics ==
=== Regular season ===
Scoring leaders
Player	GP	G	A	Pts	PIM
Wayne Gretzky	80	71	125	196	59
Mark Messier	77	48	58	106	72
Glenn Anderson	77	48	56	104	70
Jari Kurri	80	45	59	104	22
Paul Coffey	80	29	67	96	87

Goaltending
Player	GP	TOI	W	L	T	GA	SO	Save %	GAA
Lindsay Middlebrook	1	60	1	0	0	3	0	.909	3.00
Andy Moog	50	2833	33	8	7	167	1	.891	3.54
Grant Fuhr	32	1803	13	12	5	129	0	.868	4.29
Ron Low	3	104	0	1	0	10	0	.818	5.77

=== Playoffs ===
Scoring leaders
Player	GP	G	A	Pts	PIM
Wayne Gretzky	16	12	26	38	4
Jari Kurri	16	8	15	23	8
Mark Messier	15	15	6	21	14
Glenn Anderson	16	10	10	20	32
Paul Coffey	16	7	7	14	14

Goaltending
Player	GP	TOI	W	L	GA	SO	Save %	GAA
Grant Fuhr	1	11	0	0	0	0	1.000	0.00
Andy Moog	16	949	11	5	48	0	N/A	3.03

== Records ==
- 424: An NHL team record for most goals in a single season.

- 418: A new NHL team record for most goals in a single season on April 1, 1983.

- 125: An NHL record for most assists in a single season by Wayne Gretzky.

- 121: A new NHL record for most assists in a single season by Wayne Gretzky on April 1, 1983.

- 38: An NHL record for most points in a playoffs by Wayne Gretzky.

- 36: A new NHL record for most points in a playoffs by Wayne Gretzky on May 12, 1983.

- 33: An Oilers record for most wins in a single season by Andy Moog.

- 29: A new Oilers record for most wins in a single season by Andy Moog on March 13, 1983.

- 26: An NHL record for most assists in a playoffs by Wayne Gretzky.

- 24: A new NHL record for most assists in a playoffs by Wayne Gretzky on May 12, 1983.

- 3: Tied NHL record for most short-handed goals in a playoffs by Wayne Gretzky on April 17, 1983.

=== Milestones ===
Regular Season
Player	Milestone	Reached
John Blum	1st NHL Game; 1st NHL Assist; 1st NHL Point	October 5, 1982
Randy Gregg	1st NHL Game	October 5, 1982
Mark Messier	100th NHL Assist	October 5, 1982
Jaroslav Pouzar	1st NHL Game; 1st NHL Goal; 1st NHL Assist; 1st NHL Point	October 5, 1982
Laurie Boschman	200th NHL Game	October 8, 1982
Wayne Gretzky	200th NHL Goal	October 9, 1982
Jari Kurri	100th NHL Assist	October 9, 1982
Randy Gregg	1st NHL Assist; 1st NHL Point	October 12, 1982
Glenn Anderson	200th NHL PIM	October 16, 1982
Kevin Lowe	100th NHL Point	October 17, 1982
Randy Gregg	1st NHL Goal	October 24, 1982
Ron Low	300th NHL Game	October 24, 1982
Glenn Anderson	100th NHL Assist	November 8, 1982
Dave Semenko	200th NHL Game	November 8, 1982
Dave Hunter	300th NHL PIM	November 8, 1982
Mark Messier	200th NHL Point	November 11, 1982
Ken Linseman	600th NHL PIM	November 14, 1982
Jaroslav Pouzar	1st NHL Gordie Howe hat trick	November 14, 1982
Wayne Gretzky	17th NHL Hat-trick	November 21, 1982
Laurie Boschman	500th NHL PIM	November 26, 1982
Mark Messier	100th NHL Goal	November 28, 1982
Wayne Gretzky	100th NHL PIM	December 1, 1982
Don Jackson	100th NHL PIM	December 4, 1982
Dave Lumley	100th NHL Assist	December 5, 1982
Lee Fogolin	600th NHL Game	December 9, 1982
Jari Kurri	200th NHL Point	December 9, 1982
Paul Coffey	1st NHL Hat-trick	December 11, 1982
Paul Coffey	100th NHL Assist	December 17, 1982
Jari Kurri	4th NHL Hat-trick	December 17, 1982
Mark Messier	4th NHL Hat-trick; 1st Four-Goal NHL Game	December 19, 1982
Glenn Anderson	4th NHL Hat-trick	December 22, 1982
Wayne Gretzky	1st NHL Gordie Howe Hat-trick	December 22, 1982
Wayne Gretzky	600th NHL Point	December 26, 1982
Pat Hughes	400th NHL PIM	December 26, 1982
Glenn Anderson	200th NHL Point	December 31, 1982
Mark Messier	2nd NHL Gordie Howe Hat-trick	December 31, 1982
Ken Linseman	200th NHL Assist	January 4, 1983
Glenn Anderson	5th NHL Hat-trick	January 7, 1983
Paul Coffey	200th NHL Game	January 12, 1983
Charlie Huddy	100th NHL Game	January 18, 1983
Mark Messier	5th NHL Hat-trick	January 19, 1983
Wayne Gretzky	400th NHL Assist	January 23, 1983
Pat Hughes	300th NHL Game	January 26, 1983
Glenn Anderson	100th NHL Goal	January 29, 1983
Ken Linseman	300th NHL Point	January 29, 1983
Dave Lumley	400th NHL PIM	January 29, 1983
Jari Kurri	200th NHL Game	January 30, 1983
Jari Kurri	300th NHL PIM	February 17, 1983
Wayne Gretzky	50th Goal in 60 Games	February 19, 1983
Ken Linseman	1st NHL Hat-trick	February 19, 1983
Kevin Lowe	100th NHL Assist	February 19, 1983
Wayne Gretzky	300th NHL Game	February 20, 1983
Ken Linseman	700th NHL PIM	February 22, 1983
Dave Semenko	500th NHL PIM	February 22, 1983
Andy Moog	1st NHL Shutout	February 27, 1983
Garry Unger	1,100th NHL Game	February 27, 1983
Paul Coffey	200th NHL Point	March 2, 1983
Tom Roulston	100th NHL Game	March 2, 1983
Lee Fogolin	900th NHL PIM	March 5, 1983
Ken Linseman	300th NHL Game	March 5, 1983
Jari Kurri	100th NHL Goal; 5th NHL Hat-trick	March 5, 1983
Mark Messier	400th NHL PIM	March 6, 1983
Wayne Gretzky	18th NHL Hat-trick	March 8, 1983
Charlie Huddy	100th NHL PIM	March 16, 1983
Don Jackson	100th NHL Game	March 19, 1983
Ken Linseman	100th NHL Goal	March 23, 1983
Willy Lindstrom	100th NHL Goal	March 26, 1983
Kevin Lowe	300th NHL Game	March 26, 1983
Wayne Gretzky	700th NHL Point	March 29, 1983
Mark Messier	300th NHL Game	March 29, 1983
Dave Hunter	300th NHL Game	April 1, 1983

Playoffs
Player	Milestone	Reached
Wayne Gretzky	3rd NHL Hat-trick; 1st NHL Natural Hat-trick; 1st Four-Goal NHL Game	April 6, 1983
Dave Hunter	1st NHL Goal	April 6, 1983
Don Nachbaur	1st NHL Game	April 7, 1983
Ray Cote	1st NHL Game	April 9, 1983
Kevin Lowe	1st NHL Goal	April 9, 1983
Mark Messier	1st NHL Hat-trick; 1st Four-Goal NHL Game	April 14, 1983
Andy Moog	1st NHL Assist; 1st NHL Point	April 14, 1983
Randy Gregg	1st NHL Goal	April 15, 1983
Don Jackson	1st NHL Goal	April 15, 1983
Ray Cote	1st NHL Goal; 1st NHL Point	April 17, 1983
Wayne Gretzky	50th NHL Point; 4th NHL Hat-trick; 2nd Four-Goal NHL Game	April 17, 1983
Mark Messier	2nd NHL Hat-trick	April 17, 1983
Dave Semenko	50th NHL PIM	April 17, 1983
Lee Fogolin	100th NHL PIM	April 18, 1983
Tom Roulston	1st NHL Assist	April 20, 1983
Dave Semenko	1st NHL Assist; 1st NHL Point	April 20, 1983
Ken Linseman	50th NHL Game	April 24, 1983
Glenn Anderson	1st NHL Hat-trick; 1st Four-Goal NHL Game	April 26, 1983
Ray Cote	1st NHL Assist	April 26, 1983
Mark Messier	3rd NHL Hat-trick	April 26, 1983
Dave Hunter	100th NHL PIM	May 1, 1983
Ken Linseman	150th NHL PIM	May 1, 1983
Ken Linseman	50th NHL Assist	May 3, 1983
Jaroslav Pouzar	1st NHL Game; 1st NHL Goal; 1st NHL Point	May 3, 1983
Dave Semenko	1st NHL Goal	May 12, 1983
Dave Lumley	50th NHL PIM	May 12, 1983
Glenn Anderson	50th NHL PIM	May 17, 1983

== Transactions ==
=== Trades ===
June 22, 1982	To Los Angeles Kings Blair Barnes	To Edmonton Oilers Paul Mulvey
July 2, 1982	To Colorado Rockies Ed Cooper	To Edmonton Oilers Stan Weir
August 19, 1982	To Hartford Whalers Risto Siltanen; Brent Loney	To Edmonton Oilers Ken Linseman; Don Nachbaur
September 14, 1982	To Detroit Red Wings Stan Weir	To Edmonton Oilers Cash
October 22, 1982	To Philadelphia Flyers Bob Hoffmeyer	To Edmonton Oilers Peter Dineen
December 7, 1982	To Los Angeles Kings Rick Blight	To Edmonton Oilers Alan Hangsleben
January 15, 1983	To Toronto Maple Leafs Read Bailey	To Edmonton Oilers Serge Boisvert
February 19, 1983	To New Jersey Devils Ron Low; Jim McTaggart	To Edmonton Oilers Lindsay Middlebrook; Paul Miller
March 7, 1983	To Winnipeg Jets Laurie Boschman	To Edmonton Oilers Willy Lindstrom

=== Players acquired ===
Date	Player	Former team
August 16, 1982	Joe McDonnell	Vancouver Canucks
October 18, 1982	Randy Gregg	Kokudo Keikaku (JIHL)
October 25, 1982	Bob Attwell	Colorado Rockies
October 25, 1982	Rick Blight	Toronto Maple Leafs
October 27, 1982	Reid Bailey	Philadelphia Flyers
October 27, 1982	Jim McTaggart	Washington Capitals
November 10, 1982	Al Hill	Philadelphia Flyers
April 2, 1983	Dean Dachyshyn	North Dakota Fighting Sioux (NCAA)

=== Players lost ===
Date	Player	New team	Term
	Mike Toal	Retired	
June 3, 1982	Brett Callighen	HC Lugano (NDA)	1-year
August 27, 1982	Matti Hagman	HIFK (SM-liiga)	
September 25, 1982	Brad Knelson	New Jersey Devils	
September 25, 1982	Roy Sommer	New Jersey Devils	
September 27, 1982	Curt Brackenbury	St. Louis Blues	

=== Signings ===
Date	Player	Term
August 27, 1982	Jari Kurri	

== Draft picks ==
Edmonton's draft picks at the 1982 NHL entry draft

Round	#	Player	Nationality	College/Junior/Club team (League)
1	20	Jim Playfair	Canada	Portland Winter Hawks (WHL)
2	41	Steve Graves	Canada	Sault Ste. Marie Greyhounds (OHL)
3	62	Brent Loney	Canada	Cornwall Royals (OHL)
4	83	Jaroslav Pouzar	Czechoslovakia	HC České Budějovice (Czechoslovak Extraliga)
5	104	Dwayne Boettger	Canada	Toronto Marlboros (OHL)
6	125	Raimo Summanen	Finland	Ilves (SM-liiga)
7	146	Brian Small	Canada	Ottawa 67's (OHL)
8	167	Dean Clark	Canada	St. Albert Saints (AJHL)
9	188	Ian Wood	Canada	Portland Winter Hawks (WHL)
10	209	Grant Dion	Canada	Cowichan Valley Capitals (BCJHL)
11	230	Chris Smith	Canada	Oshawa Generals (OHL)
12	251	Jeff Crawford	Canada	Regina Pats (WHL)
