= 1982–83 Quebec Nordiques season =

National Hockey League team season

1982–83 Quebec Nordiques
- Division: 4th Adams
- Conference: 8th Wales
- 1982–83 record: 34–34–12
- Home record: 23–10–7
- Road record: 11–24–5
- Goals for: 343
- Goals against: 336

Team information
- General manager: Maurice Filion
- Coach: Michel Bergeron
- Captain: Vacant
- Alternate captains: None
- Arena: Colisée de Québec

Team leaders
- Goals: Michel Goulet (57)
- Assists: Peter Stastny (77)
- Points: Peter Stastny (124)
- Penalty minutes: Dale Hunter (206)
- Plus/minus: Michel Goulet (+31)
- Wins: Dan Bouchard (20)
- Goals against average: Dan Bouchard (4.01)

The 1982–83 Quebec Nordiques season was the Nordiques fourth season in the National Hockey League (NHL). In the 1981–82 season, Quebec recorded their first winning season in the NHL, as they had a record of 34–34–12, earning 80 points, in which they finished fourth in the Adams Division, qualifying for the post-season for the second consecutive season. The Nordiques lost in the first round of the playoffs to the Boston Bruins.

== Off-season ==
During the off-season, the Nordiques announced that they would not have a team captain for the 1982–83 season, as Andre Dupont only had the position for the second half of the 1981–82 season after team captain Robbie Ftorek was dealt to the New York Rangers. Expectations were high for the club after their improbable playoff run, in which the team was only one round away from a berth in the Stanley Cup finals.

== Regular season ==
The Nordiques would have a mediocre regular season, as they hovered around the .500 mark for the entire year. Quebec would set a team record for victories, winning 34 games, however, the team finished with two fewer points than the previous season, as they finished the year with a 34-34-12 record, earning 80 points, and their third consecutive playoff appearance, as they finished in fourth place in the Adams Division.

Offensively, the Nordiques were led by Peter Stastny, who led the club with 124 points, and was second in the league scoring race, finishing behind Wayne Gretzky of the Edmonton Oilers. Michel Goulet had a breakout season, scoring a team record 57 goals, which was the fourth highest total in the league. Goulet added 48 assists, earning 105 points, which was good for eighth in the NHL. Anton Stastny scored 32 goals and 92 points, while Marian Stastny scored 36 goals and 79 points despite missing 20 games due to injuries. On the blueline, Dave Pichette led the scoring, recording 24 points in 53 games, while Normand Rochefort earned 23 points in 62 games. Dale Hunter once again provided the team toughness, recording 206 penalty minutes.

In goal, Dan Bouchard was the number one goalie, winning a team best 20 games, while posting a team low GAA of 4.01, as well as recording the only shutout Quebec had during the season.

=== Season standings ===
Adams Division
	GP	W	L	T	GF	GA	Pts
**Boston Bruins**	80	50	20	10	327	228	110
**Montreal Canadiens**	80	42	24	14	350	286	98
**Buffalo Sabres**	80	38	29	13	318	285	89
**Quebec Nordiques**	80	34	34	12	343	336	80
Hartford Whalers	80	19	54	7	261	403	45

Note: GP = Games played, W = Wins, L = Losses, T = Ties, Pts = Points, GF = Goals for, GA = Goals against
Note: Teams that qualified for the playoffs are highlighted in bold.

=== Record vs. opponents ===
Adams Division record vs. opponents

==== Vs. Wales Conference ====
**Vs. Adams Division**

1982–83 NHL records
Team	**BOS**	**BUF**	**HFD**	**MTL**	**QUE**	**Total**
Boston	—	5–3	6–2	3–3–2	5–2–1	**19–10–3**
Buffalo	3–5	—	5–2–1	3–3–2	3–3–2	**14–13–5**
Hartford	2–6	2–5–1	—	3–5	2–6	**9–22–1**
Montreal	3–3–2	3–3–2	5–3	—	5–2–1	**16–11–5**
Quebec	2–5–1	3–3–2	6–2	2–5–1	—	**13–15–4**

**Vs. Patrick Division**

1982–83 NHL records
Team	**NJD**	**NYI**	**NYR**	**PHI**	**PIT**	**WSH**	**Total**
Boston	1−0−2	2−0−1	3−0	2−0−1	2−1	0−3	**10−4−4**
Buffalo	2−0−1	2−1	2−0−1	2−1	1−1−1	3−0	**12−3−3**
Hartford	2–1	1–2	1–2	1–2	0–3	0−2−1	**5−12−1**
Montreal	2−1	0−1−2	2–1	2−1	2−1	1−0−2	**9−5−4**
Quebec	2−1	1−1–1	2–1	0−3	3−0	1−1−1	**9−7−2**

==== Vs. Campbell Conference ====
**Vs. Norris Division**

1982–83 NHL records
Team	**CHI**	**DET**	**MIN**	**STL**	**TOR**	**Total**
Boston	3–0	3–0	3–0	3–0	2–1	**14–1–0**
Buffalo	1−1−1	1−1−1	0−2−1	2−1	0−2−1	**4−7−4**
Hartford	0–3	0–3	0−2−1	1–2	1–2	**2–12–1**
Montreal	0–3	1−0–2	3–0	2–0–1	0−1–2	**6–4–5**
Quebec	1–2	1–1–1	2–1	1–1–1	1–1–1	**6–6–3**

**Vs. Smythe Division**

1982–83 NHL records
Team	**CGY**	**EDM**	**LAK**	**VAN**	**WIN**	**Total**
Boston	2−0−1	2−0−1	1−2	2−1	0−2−1	**7−5−3**
Buffalo	2−1	1–2	2−1	1−1−1	2−1	**8−6−1**
Hartford	0−1–2	0–2–1	1–2	1–2	1–1–1	**3–8–4**
Montreal	2−1	1−2	2−1	3–0	3−0	**11−4−0**
Quebec	2−0−1	1−1−1	1−1−1	0−3	2−1	**6−6−3**

== Schedule and results ==
1982–83 regular season
October

Game	Date	Visitor	Score	Home	Record	Points	Attendance
1	October 6	Quebec Nordiques	6–4	Buffalo Sabres	1–0–0	2	11,196
2	October 7	Quebec Nordiques	5–9	Philadelphia Flyers	1–1–0	2	16,250
3	October 9	Buffalo Sabres	4–6	Quebec Nordiques	2–1–0	4	15,118
4	October 11	Montreal Canadiens	4–3	Quebec Nordiques	2–2–0	4	15,259
5	October 14	Los Angeles Kings	4–4	Quebec Nordiques	2–2–1	5	14,011
6	October 16	Philadelphia Flyers	4–3	Quebec Nordiques	2–3–1	5	15,226
7	October 20	Quebec Nordiques	5–3	Detroit Red Wings	3-3–1	7	8,242
8	October 21	Pittsburgh Penguins	4–8	Quebec Nordiques	4–3–1	9	14,140
9	October 23	Quebec Nordiques	5–9	Montreal Canadiens	4–4–1	9	18,144
10	October 26	Toronto Maple Leafs	4–9	Quebec Nordiques	5–4–1	11	14,483
11	October 30	New York Rangers	4–5	Quebec Nordiques	6–4–1	13	15,186

November

Game	Date	Visitor	Score	Home	Record	Points	Attendance
12	November 2	Vancouver Canucks	5–2	Quebec Nordiques	6–5–1	13	15,021
13	November 6	Minnesota North Stars	1–4	Quebec Nordiques	7–5–1	15	15,229
14	November 8	Edmonton Oilers	5–5	Quebec Nordiques	7–5–2	16	15,221
15	November 10	Quebec Nordiques	5–7	Hartford Whalers	7–6–2	16	9,909
16	November 11	Quebec Nordiques	3–2	Boston Bruins	8–6–2	18	14,685
17	November 13	New Jersey Devils	2–7	Quebec Nordiques	9–6–2	20	15,004
18	November 16	Boston Bruins	7–4	Quebec Nordiques	9–7–2	20	15,258
19	November 18	Quebec Nordiques	4–7	Montreal Canadiens	9–8–2	20	18,895
20	November 21	Quebec Nordiques	9–7	Edmonton Oilers	10–8–2	22	17,498
21	November 23	Quebec Nordiques	2–5	Vancouver Canucks	10–9–2	22	15,781
22	November 25	Quebec Nordiques	3–2	Calgary Flames	11–9–2	24	7,226
23	November 27	Chicago Black Hawks	3–1	Quebec Nordiques	11–10–2	24	15,254
24	November 30	Winnipeg Jets	6–8	Quebec Nordiques	12–10–2	26	14,828

December

Game	Date	Visitor	Score	Home	Record	Points	Attendance
25	December 2	Quebec Nordiques	3–3	Boston Bruins	12–10-3	27	12,252
26	December 4	Buffalo Sabres	2–3	Quebec Nordiques	13–10–3	29	15,237
27	December 7	Boston Bruins	5–10	Quebec Nordiques	14–10–3	31	15,235
28	December 9	Quebec Nordiques	1–4	Philadelphia Flyers	14–11–3	31	16,203
29	December 11	Quebec Nordiques	7–4	Pittsburgh Penguins	15–11–3	33	11,142
30	December 12	Quebec Nordiques	3–7	Chicago Black Hawks	15–12–3	33	18,132
31	December 14	Toronto Maple Leafs	4–4	Quebec Nordiques	15–12–4	34	14,845
32	December 18	Buffalo Sabres	5–4	Quebec Nordiques	15–13–4	34	15,023
33	December 19	Quebec Nordiques	1–3	Buffalo Sabres	15–14–4	34	11,308
34	December 21	New York Islanders	3–3	Quebec Nordiques	15–14–5	35	15,237
35	December 23	Montreal Canadiens	3–6	Quebec Nordiques	16–14–5	37	15,314
36	December 26	Quebec Nordiques	4–4	Montreal Canadiens	16–14–6	38	18,117
37	December 28	Hartford Whalers	1–4	Quebec Nordiques	17–14–6	40	15,236

January

Game	Date	Visitor	Score	Home	Record	Points	Attendance
38	January 2	Washington Capitals	7–4	Quebec Nordiques	17–15–6	40	15,258
39	January 4	Montreal Canadiens	1–3	Quebec Nordiques	18–15–6	42	15,276
40	January 7	Quebec Nordiques	1–5	New York Rangers	18–16–6	42	17,421
41	January 8	Quebec Nordiques	1–6	New York Islanders	18–17–6	42	15,230
42	January 10	Quebec Nordiques	2–6	New Jersey Devils	18–18–6	42	9,814
43	January 12	Quebec Nordiques	1–2	Buffalo Sabres	18–19–6	42	11,507
44	January 13	Quebec Nordiques	0–2	Boston Bruins	18–20–6	42	14,685
45	January 15	Calgary Flames	2–7	Quebec Nordiques	19–20–6	44	15,039
46	January 18	St. Louis Blues	1–3	Quebec Nordiques	20-20–6	46	15,232
47	January 21	Quebec Nordiques	5–4	Washington Capitals	21–20–6	48	13,365
48	January 22	Quebec Nordiques	7–3	Pittsburgh Penguins	22–20–6	50	10,336
49	January 25	Winnipeg Jets	3–6	Quebec Nordiques	23–20–6	52	15,193
50	January 27	Quebec Nordiques	2–5	Hartford Whalers	23–21–6	52	11,061
51	January 29	New Jersey Devils	4–6	Quebec Nordiques	24–21–6	54	15,056

February

Game	Date	Visitor	Score	Home	Record	Points	Attendance
52	February 1	Hartford Whalers	3–12	Quebec Nordiques	25–21–6	56	15,190
53	February 3	Quebec Nordiques	3–5	Boston Bruins	25–22–6	56	13,744
54	February 5	Buffalo Sabres	0–0	Quebec Nordiques	25–22–7	57	15,247
55	February 6	Washington Capitals	4-4	Quebec Nordiques	25–22–8	58	15,232
56	February 10	Quebec Nordiques	3–3	Calgary Flames	25–22–9	59	7,242
57	February 11	Quebec Nordiques	3–7	Edmonton Oilers	25–23–9	59	17,498
58	February 13	Quebec Nordiques	5–4	Chicago Black Hawks	26–23–9	61	17,875
59	February 15	New York Islanders	1–4	Quebec Nordiques	27–23–9	63	15,240
60	February 17	Quebec Nordiques	3–6	Minnesota North Stars	27–24–9	63	13,922
61	February 19	Quebec Nordiques	4–4	St. Louis Blues	27–24–10	64	12,052
62	February 22	Quebec Nordiques	1–6	Montreal Canadiens	27–25–10	64	17,721
63	February 24	Montreal Canadiens	6–3	Quebec Nordiques	27–26–10	64	15,330
64	February 26	New York Rangers	3-6	Quebec Nordiques	28–26–10	66	15,250

March

Game	Date	Visitor	Score	Home	Record	Points	Attendance
65	March 1	Detroit Red Wings	5–5	Quebec Nordiques	28–26–11	67	15,273
66	March 3	Quebec Nordiques	3–5	Detroit Red Wings	28–27-11	67	13,326
67	March 5	Hartford Whalers	3–10	Quebec Nordiques	29–27–11	69	15,240
68	March 6	Quebec Nordiques	7–3	Hartford Whalers	30–27–11	71	9,321
69	March 8	Boston Bruins	11–5	Quebec Nordiques	30–28–11	71	15,292
70	March 13	Minnesota North Stars	3–6	Quebec Nordiques	31–28–11	73	15,250
71	March 15	Quebec Nordiques	3-5	St. Louis Blues	31–29-11	73	11,180
72	March 17	Quebec Nordiques	3–4	Los Angeles Kings	31–30–11	73	11,770
73	March 18	Quebec Nordiques	3–7	Vancouver Canucks	31–31–11	73	16,413
74	March 20	Quebec Nordiques	2–3	Winnipeg Jets	31–32–11	73	15,075
75	March 24	Los Angeles Kings	3–7	Quebec Nordiques	32–32–11	75	15,142
76	March 26	Quebec Nordiques	1–2	Toronto Maple Leafs	32–33–11	75	16,382
77	March 27	Quebec Nordiques	6–6	Buffalo Sabres	32–33–12	76	14,063
78	March 29	Boston Bruins	4–3	Quebec Nordiques	32–34–12	76	15,227

April

Game	Date	Visitor	Score	Home	Record	Points	Attendance
79	April 2	Quebec Nordiques	5–4	Hartford Whalers	33–34–12	78	11,142
80	April 3	Hartford Whalers	5–6	Quebec Nordiques	34–34–12	80	15,132

Legend: Win (2 points) Loss (0 points) Tie (1 point)

== Playoffs ==
The Nordiques opened the 1983 Stanley Cup playoffs with a best of five Adams Division semi-final series against the Boston Bruins. The Nordiques eliminated Boston in seven games in the Division finals the previous season. The Bruins had the best record in the Adams Division, posting a record of 50–20–10, earning 110 points, which was 30 more than the Nordiques. The series opened with two games at the Boston Garden, and Quebec stunned the Bruins in the first period, as Peter Stastny had a natural hat trick, as Quebec took a 3–0 lead. The Bruins came back, led by two goals by Mike O'Connell and one by Barry Pederson to even the game up, setting up overtime. In the extra period, Barry Pederson scored, as Boston completed the comeback and won the game 4–3. In the second game, the two teams exchanged goals in the first period, before Dale Hunter gave the Nordiques a 2–1 lead midway through the third period. The Bruins managed another comeback though, as Boston scored three unanswered goals to win the game 4–2, and take a 2–0 series lead. The series then moved to Le Colisée for the next two games, and the Nordiques, led by 31 saves by Dan Bouchard, staved off elimination with a 2–1 victory and cut the Bruins series lead in half. In the fourth game, Bruins goaltender Pete Peeters stole the show, making 38 saves, as Boston held on for a 2–1 win, and eliminated the Nordiques.

1983 Stanley Cup playoffs
Adams Division Semifinals vs. (A1) Boston Bruins – Bruins win 3–1

Game	Date	Visitor	Score	Home	Series	Attendance
1	April 5	Quebec Nordiques	3–4	Boston Bruins	0-1	13,549
2	April 7	Quebec Nordiques	2–4	Boston Bruins	0-2	14,685
3	April 9	Boston Bruins	1–2	Quebec Nordiques	1-2	15,290
4	April 10	Boston Bruins	2–1	Quebec Nordiques	1-3	15,269

Legend: Win Loss

== Player statistics ==
Regular season
Scoring

Player	Pos	GP	G	A	Pts	PIM	+/-	PPG	SHG	GWG
Peter Stastny	C	75	47	77	124	78	28	5	0	4
Michel Goulet	LW	80	57	48	105	51	31	10	4	4
Anton Stastny	LW	79	32	60	92	25	25	10	0	7
Marian Stastny	RW	60	36	43	79	32	20	13	0	3
Real Cloutier	RW	68	28	39	67	30	-4	5	0	3
Wilf Paiement	RW	80	26	38	64	170	-10	6	0	2
Dale Hunter	C	80	17	46	63	206	10	1	2	1
Marc Tardif	LW	76	21	31	52	34	0	4	0	3
Alain Cote	LW	79	12	28	40	45	-1	0	0	0
Louis Sleigher	RW	51	14	10	24	49	8	0	0	1
Dave Pichette	D	53	3	21	24	49	9	0	0	0
Jacques Richard	LW	35	9	14	23	6	0	1	0	1
Normand Rochefort	D	62	6	17	23	40	11	1	0	1
Pierre Aubry	LW	77	7	9	16	48	-6	0	0	1
Wally Weir	D	58	5	11	16	135	11	1	0	0
Andre Dupont	D	46	3	12	15	69	11	0	0	0
Mario Marois	D	36	2	12	14	108	5	0	0	0
Randy Moller	D	75	2	12	14	145	11	0	0	1
Blake Wesley	D	52	4	8	12	84	-4	2	0	1
Rick Lapointe	D	43	2	9	11	59	14	0	0	0
Jean Hamel	D	51	2	7	9	38	11	0	0	0
Tim Tookey	C	12	1	6	7	4	2	0	0	0
Richard David	LW	16	3	3	6	4	-2	2	0	1
Pierre Lacroix	D	13	0	5	5	6	4	0	0	0
Dan Bouchard	G	50	0	4	4	8	0	0	0	0
Anders Eldebrink	D	12	1	2	3	8	-1	0	0	0
Pat Price	D	14	1	2	3	28	-3	0	0	0
Basil McRae	LW	22	1	1	2	59	-1	0	0	0
Paul Gillis	C	7	0	2	2	2	-1	0	0	0
Dennis Sobchuk	C	2	1	0	1	2	1	0	0	0
John Garrett	G	17	0	1	1	2	0	0	0	0
Michel Bolduc	D	7	0	0	0	6	2	0	0	0
Mike Eagles	C/LW	2	0	0	0	2	-1	0	0	0
Jean-Marc Gaulin	RW	1	0	0	0	0	0	0	0	0
Terry Johnson	D	3	0	0	0	2	0	0	0	0
Clint Malarchuk	G	15	0	0	0	0	0	0	0	0
David Shaw	D	2	0	0	0	0	-1	0	0	0
Gaston Therrien	D	5	0	0	0	4	-4	0	0	0

Goaltending

Player	MIN	GP	W	L	T	GA	GAA	SO
Dan Bouchard	2947	50	20	21	8	197	4.01	1
Clint Malarchuk	900	15	8	5	2	71	4.73	0
John Garrett	953	17	6	8	2	64	4.03	0
Team:	4800	80	34	34	12	332	4.15	1

Playoffs
Scoring

Player	Pos	GP	G	A	Pts	PIM	PPG	SHG	GWG
Peter Stastny	C	4	3	2	5	10	1	0	0
Anton Stastny	LW	4	2	2	4	0	0	0	0
Dale Hunter	C	4	2	1	3	24	0	1	0
Alain Cote	LW	4	0	3	3	0	0	0	0
Randy Moller	D	4	1	0	1	4	1	0	1
Dan Bouchard	G	4	0	1	1	14	0	0	0
Wilf Paiement	RW	4	0	1	1	4	0	0	0
Dave Pichette	D	2	0	1	1	0	0	0	0
Wally Weir	D	4	0	1	1	19	0	0	0
Pierre Aubry	LW	2	0	0	0	0	0	0	0
Real Cloutier	RW	4	0	0	0	0	0	0	0
Andre Dupont	D	4	0	0	0	8	0	0	0
Anders Eldebrink	D	1	0	0	0	0	0	0	0
Michel Goulet	LW	4	0	0	0	6	0	0	0
Jean Hamel	D	4	0	0	0	2	0	0	0
Pat Price	D	4	0	0	0	14	0	0	0
Jacques Richard	LW	4	0	0	0	2	0	0	0
Normand Rochefort	D	1	0	0	0	2	0	0	0
Louis Sleigher	RW	4	0	0	0	4	0	0	0
Marian Stastny	RW	2	0	0	0	0	0	0	0
Marc Tardif	LW	4	0	0	0	2	0	0	0
Blake Wesley	D	4	0	0	0	2	0	0	0

Goaltending

Player	MIN	GP	W	L	GA	GAA	SO
Dan Bouchard	242	4	1	3	11	2.73	0
Team:	242	4	1	3	11	2.73	0

Note:

Pos = Position;GP = Games played; G = Goals; A = Assists; Pts = Points; PIM = Penalty minutes; +/- = Plus/minus; PPG = Power-play goals; SHG = Short-handed goals; GWG = Game-winning goals
Pos = Position;GP = Games played; Min, TOI = Minutes played; W = Wins; L = Losses; T,T/OT = Ties; OTL = Overtime losses; GA = Goals-against; GAA = Goals-against average; SO = Shutouts; SA = Shots against; SV = Shots saved;SV% = Save percentage;

== Awards & records ==
- Second NHL All-Star team: Michel Goulet

== Transactions ==
The Nordiques were involved in the following transactions during the 1982–83 season.

=== Trades ===
August 4, 1982	To St. Louis Blues Pat Hickey	To Quebec Nordiques Rick Lapointe
December 3, 1982	To Hartford Whalers Pierre Lacroix	To Quebec Nordiques Blake Wesley
February 4, 1983	To Vancouver Canucks John Garrett	To Quebec Nordiques Anders Eldebrink
June 8, 1983	To Buffalo Sabres Real Cloutier; 1st round pick in 1983 – Adam Creighton	To Quebec Nordiques Tony McKegney; Andre Savard; J.F. Sauve; 3rd round pick in 1983 – Iiro Jarvi
June 8, 1983	To Chicago Black Hawks 11th round pick in 1984 – David Mackey	To Quebec Nordiques 12th round pick in 1983 – Jindrich Kokrment

=== Waivers ===
December 31, 1982	From Pittsburgh Penguins Pat Price

=== Free agents ===
Player / Former team; Brian Ford / Billings Bighorns (WHL)	Player / New team; Jere Gillis / Buffalo Sabres

== Draft picks ==
Quebec's draft picks from the 1982 NHL entry draft which was held at the Montreal Forum in Montreal.

Round	#	Player	Nationality	College/junior/club team (league)
1	13	David Shaw	Canada	Kitchener Rangers (OHL)
2	34	Paul Gillis	Canada	Niagara Falls Flyers (OHL)
3	55	Mario Gosselin	Canada	Shawinigan Cataractes (QMJHL)
4	76	Jiri Lala	Czechoslovakia	Dukla Jihlava (Czech.)
5	97	Phil Stanger	Canada	Seattle Breakers (WHL)
7	131	Daniel Poudrier	Canada	Shawinigan Cataractes (QMJHL)
9	181	Mike Hough	Canada	Kitchener Rangers (OHL)
10	202	Vincent Lukac	Czechoslovakia	HC Košice (Czech.)
11	223	Andre Martin	Canada	Montreal Juniors (QMJHL)
12	244	Jozef Lukac	Czechoslovakia	HC Košice (Czech.)
12	248	Jan Jasko	Czechoslovakia	Slovan Bratislava (Slovak)
