= 1981–82 NHL transactions =

The following is a list of all team-to-team transactions that have occurred in the National Hockey League during the 1981–82 NHL season. It lists what team each player has been traded to, signed by, or claimed by, and for which player(s) or draft pick(s), if applicable.

== Trades between teams ==
=== June ===
June 9, 1981	To Minnesota North Stars Nelson Burton	To Quebec Nordiques Dan Chicoine
June 10, 1981	To Colorado Rockies 1st-rd pick - 1981 entry draft (# 5 - Joe Cirella); 2nd-rd pick - 1981 entry draft (# 26 - Rich Chernomaz)	To Washington Capitals 1st-rd pick - 1981 entry draft (# 3 - Bobby Carpenter); 3rd-rd pick - 1981 entry draft (# 45 - Eric Calder)

=== July ===
July 3, 1981	To Hartford Whalers Don Gillen; Rick MacLeish; Blake Wesley; 1st-rd pick - 1982 entry draft (# 14 - Paul Lawless); 2nd-rd pick - 1982 entry draft (# 35 - Mark Paterson); 3rd-rd pick - 1982 entry draft (# 56 - Kevin Dineen)	To Philadelphia Flyers Ray Allison; Fred Arthur; 1st-rd pick - 1982 entry draft (# 4 - Ron Sutter); 3rd-rd pick - 1982 entry draft (# 46 - Miroslav Dvorak)
July 3, 1981	To St. Louis Blues Scott Campbell; John Markell	To Winnipeg Jets Paul MacLean; Bryan Maxwell; Ed Staniowski
July 15, 1981	To Vancouver Canucks rights to Ivan Hlinka	To Winnipeg Jets Brent Ashton; 4th-rd pick - 1982 entry draft (# 74 - Tom Martin)
July 15, 1981	To Colorado Rockies Brent Ashton; 3rd-rd pick - 1982 entry draft (# 54 - Dave Kasper)	To Winnipeg Jets Lucien DeBlois
July 21, 1981^{1}	To Boston Bruins Bruins option to swap 1st-rd picks - 1982 entry draft (# 1 - Gord Kluzak)^{2} 2nd-rd pick - 1982 entry draft (# 22 - Brian Curran)	To Colorado Rockies 10th-rd pick - 1982 entry draft (# 207 - Tony Gilliard)
July 23, 1981	To Detroit Red Wings Mark Lofthouse	To Washington Capitals Al Jensen
July 31, 1981	To Minnesota North Stars Lindsay Middlebrook	To Winnipeg Jets cash

1. A compensation trade for Boston as Colorado signed restricted free agent Dwight Foster.
2. Boston exercised the option and swap the 18th pick for the 1st overall pick in 1982.

=== August ===
August 10, 1981	To Los Angeles Kings 5th-rd pick - 1983 entry draft (# 100 - Garry Galley)	To Edmonton Oilers Jay McFarlane
August 10, 1981	To Toronto Maple Leafs Don Luce	To Los Angeles Kings Bob Gladney; 6th-rd pick - 1983 entry draft (# 108 - Kevin Stevens)
August 21, 1981	To Minnesota North Stars rights to Don Murdoch	To Edmonton Oilers Don Jackson; 3rd-rd pick - 1982 entry draft (MIN - # 59 - Wally Chapman)^{1}
August 21, 1981	To Minnesota North Stars 1st-rd pick - 1982 entry draft (# 17 - Murray Craven)	To Detroit Red Wings Greg Smith rights to Don Murdoch; 1st-rd pick - 1982 entry draft (# 2 - Brian Bellows)

1. Minnesota's third-round pick was re-acquired on draft day to complete a trade on February 2, 1981 that sent Gary Edwards to Edmonton in exchange for future considerations.

=== September ===
September 8, 1981	To Winnipeg Jets Doug Soetaert	To New York Rangers 3rd-rd pick - 1983 entry draft (# 49 - Vesa Salo)
September 11, 1981	To Toronto Maple Leafs 4th-rd pick - 1982 entry draft (# 73 - Vladimir Ruzicka)	To Pittsburgh Penguins Paul Harrison
September 28, 1981	To Pittsburgh Penguins future considerations	To New York Islanders Robert Holland

=== October ===
October 1, 1981	To Colorado Rockies Dave Cameron; Bob Lorimer	To New York Islanders 1st-rd pick - 1983 entry draft (# 3 - Pat LaFontaine)
October 2, 1981	To Hartford Whalers Chris Kotsopoulos; Gerry McDonald; Doug Sulliman	To New York Rangers Mike Rogers; 10th-rd pick - 1982 entry draft (# 193 - Simo Saarinen)
October 2, 1981	To Hartford Whalers Garry Howatt	To New York Islanders 5th-rd pick - 1983 entry draft (# 84 - Bob Caulfield)
October 16, 1981	To Toronto Maple Leafs 5th-rd pick - 1982 entry draft (# 99 - Sylvain Charland)	To New York Rangers Pat Hickey
October 30, 1981	To Minnesota North Stars cash	To New York Rangers Tom Younghans

=== November ===
November 10, 1981	To Calgary Flames Gary McAdam; 4th-rd pick - 1983 entry draft (# 66 - John Bekkers)	To Detroit Red Wings Eric Vail
November 11, 1981	To Toronto Maple Leafs John Gibson; Billy Harris	To Los Angeles Kings Ian Turnbull
November 11, 1981	To Calgary Flames Mel Bridgman	To Philadelphia Flyers Brad Marsh
November 25, 1981	To Colorado Rockies Don Lever; Bob MacMillan	To Calgary Flames Lanny McDonald; 4th-rd pick - 1983 entry draft (# 77 - Bill Claviter)
November 25, 1981	To Calgary Flames Pat Ribble; 2nd-rd pick - 1983 entry draft (MTL - # 35 - Todd Francis)^{1}	To Washington Capitals Bobby Gould; Randy Holt

1. Calgary's second-round pick went to Montreal as the result of a trade on September 10, 1982 that sent the Doug Risebrough and Montreal's second-round pick in 1983 NHL Entry Draft to Calgary in exchange for Calgary's third-round pick in 1984 NHL Entry Draft and this pick.

=== December ===
December 2, 1981	To Buffalo Sabres Mike Foligno; Dale McCourt; Brent Peterson	To Detroit Red Wings Danny Gare; Jim Schoenfeld; Derek Smith
December 2, 1981	To Buffalo Sabres future considerations	To Detroit Red Wings Bob Sauve
December 4, 1981	To Colorado Rockies Dick Lamby; Joe Micheletti	To St. Louis Blues Bill Baker
December 11, 1981	To Edmonton Oilers Lance Nethery	To New York Rangers Eddie Mio
December 19, 1981	To Montreal Canadiens 6th-rd pick - 1982 entry draft^{1} (# 117 - Ernie Vargas)	To Winnipeg Jets Serge Savard
December 21, 1981	To Hartford Whalers Pierre Larouche; 1st-rd pick - 1984 entry draft (# 11 - Sylvain Cote); 3rd-rd pick - 1985 entry draft (PIT - # 58 - Bruce Racine)^{2}	To Montreal Canadiens 1st-rd pick - 1984 entry draft (# 5 - Petr Svoboda); 2nd-rd pick - 1984 entry draft (# 26 - Brian Benning)^{3} 3rd-rd pick - 1985 entry draft (# 47 - Rocky Dundas)
December 29, 1981	To Hartford Whalers Russ Anderson; 8th-rd pick - 1983 entry draft (# 143 - Christian Duperron)	To Pittsburgh Penguins Rick MacLeish
December 30, 1981	To Quebec Nordiques Jere Gillis; Dean Talafous^{4}	To New York Rangers Robbie Ftorek; 8th-rd pick - 1982 entry draft (# 160 - Brian Glynn)
December 31, 1981	To Minnesota North Stars cash	To Colorado Rockies Kevin Maxwell rights to Jim Dobson

1. This is a compensation trade. Savard retired from the NHL on August 12, 1981. The Jets selected him in the NHL waiver draft on October 5, 1981. The trade was completed upon Savard's return to the NHL with the Jets.
2. Hartford's third-round pick went to Pittsburgh as the result of a trade on September 30, 1983 that sent Greg Malone to Hartford in exchange for this pick.
3. Montreal's second-round pick went to St. Louis as the result of a trade on June 9, 1984 that sent St. Louis' first-round and second-round picks in 1984 NHL Entry Draft to Montreal in exchange for Rick Wamsley, Montreal's second-round pick (32nd overall) and third-round pick in 1984 NHL Entry Draft along with this pick.
4. Dean Talafous did not report to Quebec and retired from hockey. Pat Hickey was substituted to complete the trade after an arbitrator's decision on March 8, 1982.

=== January ===
January 12, 1982	To Hartford Whalers Michel Plasse; 4th-rd pick - 1983 entry draft (# 72 - Ron Chyzowski)	To Quebec Nordiques John Garrett
January 20, 1982	To Toronto Maple Leafs Rich Costello; 2nd-rd pick - 1982 entry draft (# 25 - Peter Ihnacak) future considerations^{1} (Ken Strong)	To Philadelphia Flyers Darryl Sittler

1. Trade completed in May, 1982.

=== February ===
February 1, 1982	To Quebec Nordiques Tim Tookey; 7th-rd pick - 1982 entry draft (# 131 - Daniel Poudrier)	To Washington Capitals Lee Norwood; 6th-rd pick - 1982 entry draft (CGY - # 118 - Mats Kihlstrom)^{1}
February 2, 1982	To Hartford Whalers 10th-rd pick - 1983 entry draft (# 193 - Reine Landgren)	To New York Rangers Rob McClanahan
February 3, 1982	To Toronto Maple Leafs 5th-rd pick - 1983 entry draft (# 83 - Dan Hodgson) future considerations^{2} (6th-rd pick - 1982 entry draft - # 115 - Craig Kales)	To Pittsburgh Penguins Greg Hotham
February 14, 1982	To St. Louis Blues 8th-rd pick - 1984 entry draft (# 148 - Don Porter)	To Pittsburgh Penguins right to claim Gary Edwards off waivers from Blues without having to pay a cash waiver price

1. Washington's sixth-round pick went to Calgary as the result of a trade on June 9, 1982 that sent Ken Houston and Pat Riggin to Washington in exchange for Howard Walker, George White, Washington's third-round pick in 1983 NHL Entry Draft, second-round pick in 1984 NHL Entry Draft and this pick.
2. Trade completed on June 9, 1982 at the 1982 NHL entry draft.

=== March ===
- Trading Deadline: March 9, 1982

March 2, 1982	To Minnesota North Stars Mark Johnson	To Pittsburgh Penguins 2nd-rd pick - 1982 entry draft (# 38 - Tim Hrynewich)
March 8, 1982	To Toronto Maple Leafs Jim Korn	To Detroit Red Wings 4th-rd pick - 1982 entry draft (# 66 - Craig Coxe); 5th-rd pick - 1983 entry draft (# 88 - Joe Kocur)
March 8, 1982	To Toronto Maple Leafs Phil Drouillard; Walt Poddubny	To Edmonton Oilers Laurie Boschman
March 8, 1982	To Calgary Flames future considerations	To St. Louis Blues Kari Eloranta
March 9, 1982	To Colorado Rockies Stan Weir	To Edmonton Oilers Ed Cooper
March 9, 1982	To Edmonton Oilers Todd Bidner	To Washington Capitals Doug Hicks
March 9, 1982	To Toronto Maple Leafs Miroslav Frycer; 7th-rd pick - 1982 entry draft (# 139 - Jeff Triano)	To Quebec Nordiques Wilf Paiement
March 9, 1982	To Vancouver Canucks Tony Currie; Rick Heinz; Jim Nill; 4th-rd pick - 1982 entry draft (# 71 - Shawn Kilroy)	To St. Louis Blues Glen Hanlon
March 9, 1982	To Montreal Canadiens 2nd-rd pick - 1983 entry draft (# 27 - Sergio Momesso)	To St. Louis Blues Guy Lapointe

== Additional sources ==
- hockeydb.com - search for player and select "show trades"
- "NHL trades for 1981-1982". NHL Trade Tracker.
