= 1982 NHL entry draft =

1982 North American ice hockey draft

General information
- Date: June 9, 1982
- Location: Montreal Forum; Montreal, Quebec, Canada

Overview
- 252 total selections in 12 rounds
- First selection: (Canada) Gord Kluzak (Boston Bruins)
- Hall of Famers: 4: D Scott Stevens; D Phil Housley; LW Dave Andreychuk; C Doug Gilmour

The 1982 NHL entry draft was the 20th draft for the National Hockey League. It was held at the Montreal Forum in Montreal. The NHL teams selected 252 players eligible for entry into professional ranks, in the reverse order of the 1981–82 NHL season and playoff standings. This is the list of those players selected.

The last active player in the NHL from this draft class was Dave Andreychuk, who retired after the 2005–06 season.

== Selections by round ==
Below are listed the selections in the 1982 NHL entry draft. Club teams are located in North America unless otherwise noted.

= NHL All-Star team ·	= NHL All-Star (Note: Players are identified as an All-Star if they were selected for the All-Star game at any time in their career.) ·	= NHL All-Star and NHL All-Star team ·	= Hall of Famers

=== Round one ===
#	Player	Nationality	NHL team	College/junior/club team
1	Gord Kluzak (D)	Canada	Boston Bruins (from New Jersey)^{1}	Billings Bighorns (WHL)
2	Brian Bellows (RW)	Canada	Minnesota North Stars (from Detroit)^{2}	Kitchener Rangers (OHL)
3	Gary Nylund (D)	Canada	Toronto Maple Leafs	Portland Winter Hawks (WHL)
4	Ron Sutter (C)	Canada	Philadelphia Flyers (from Hartford)^{3}	Lethbridge Broncos (WHL)
5	Scott Stevens (D)	Canada	Washington Capitals	Kitchener Rangers (OHL)
6	Phil Housley (D)	United States	Buffalo Sabres (from Los Angeles)^{4}	South St. Paul High School (USHS-MN)
7	Ken Yaremchuk (C)	Canada	Chicago Black Hawks	Portland Winter Hawks (WHL)
8	Rocky Trottier (C)	Canada	New Jersey (Note: While the team had announced its relocation from Denver, it would not choose the nickname "Devils" until June 30.) (from St. Louis)^{5}	Billings Bighorns (WHL)
9	Paul Cyr (LW)	Canada	Buffalo Sabres (from Calgary)^{6}	Victoria Cougars (WHL)
10	Rich Sutter (RW)	Canada	Pittsburgh Penguins	Lethbridge Broncos (WHL)
11	Michel Petit (D)	Canada	Vancouver Canucks	Sherbrooke Castors (QMJHL)
12	Jim Kyte (D)	Canada	Winnipeg Jets	Cornwall Royals (OHL)
13	David Shaw (D)	Canada	Quebec Nordiques	Kitchener Rangers (OHL)
14	Paul Lawless (LW)	Canada	Hartford Whalers (from Philadelphia)^{7}	Windsor Spitfires (OHL)
15	Chris Kontos (C)	Canada	New York Rangers	Toronto Marlboros (OHL)
16	Dave Andreychuk (C)	Canada	Buffalo Sabres	Oshawa Generals (OHL)
17	Murray Craven (C)	Canada	Detroit Red Wings (from Minnesota)^{8}	Medicine Hat Tigers (WHL)
18	Ken Daneyko (D)	Canada	New Jersey (from Boston)^{9}	Seattle Breakers (WHL)
19	Alain Heroux (LW)	Canada	Montreal Canadiens	Chicoutimi Saguenéens (QMJHL)
20	Jim Playfair (D)	Canada	Edmonton Oilers	Portland Winter Hawks (WHL)
21	Patrick Flatley (RW)	Canada	New York Islanders	University of Wisconsin (WCHA)
^{Reference: "1982 NHL Entry Draft hockeydraftcentral.com".}

1. The New Jersey Devils' first-round pick went to the Boston Bruins as the result of a compensation trade on July 21, 1981 when Colorado signed restricted free agent Dwight Foster. To complete the trade, Boston's tenth-round pick in 1982 NHL Entry Draft was also sent to Colorado in exchange for Boston's option to swap first-round picks in 1982 NHL Entry Draft (this pick) and a second-round pick in 1982 NHL Entry Draft. The Colorado Rockies relocated to New Jersey to become the Devils for the 1982–83 NHL season.
2. The Detroit Red Wings' first-round pick went to the Minnesota North Stars as the result of a trade on August 21, 1981 that sent Greg Smith, rights to Don Murdoch and Minnesota's first-round pick in 1982 NHL Entry Draft to Detroit in exchange for this pick.
3. The Hartford Whalers' first-round pick went to the Philadelphia Flyers as the result of a trade on July 3, 1981 that sent Don Gillen, Rick MacLeish, Fred Arthur, Philadelphia's first-round, second-round and third-round in 1982 NHL Entry Draft to Hartford in exchange for Ray Allison, Fred Arthur, Hartford's third-round in 1982 NHL Entry Draft and this pick.
4. The Los Angeles Kings' first-round pick went to the Buffalo Sabres as the result of a trade on March 10, 1980 that sent Jerry Korab to Los Angeles in exchange for this pick.
5. The St. Louis Blues' first-round pick went to the New Jersey Devils as the result of a trade on June 9, 1982 that sent Rob Ramage to St. Louis in exchange for St. Louis' first-round pick in 1983 NHL entry draft and this pick.
6. The Calgary Flames' first-round pick went to the Buffalo Sabres as the result of a trade on June 8, 1982 that sent Richie Dunn, Don Edwards and Buffalo's second-round pick in 1982 NHL Entry Draft to Calgary in exchange for Calgary's second-round pick in 1982 NHL Entry Draft, second-round pick in 1983 NHL entry draft, Buffalo's option to swap first-round picks in 1983 NHL entry draft and this pick.
7. The Philadelphia Flyers' first-round pick went to the Hartford Whalers as the result of a trade on July 3, 1981 that sent Ray Allison, Fred Arthur, Hartford's first-round and third-round in 1982 NHL Entry Draft to Philadelphia in exchange for Don Gillen, Rick MacLeish, Fred Arthur, Philadelphia's second-round and third-round in 1982 NHL Entry Draft with this pick.
8. The Minnesota North Stars' first-round pick went to the Detroit Red Wings as the result of a trade on August 21, 1981 that sent Detroit's first-round pick in 1982 NHL Entry Draft in exchange for Greg Smith, rights to Don Murdoch and this pick.
9. The Boston Bruins' first-round pick went to the New Jersey Devils as the result of a trade on July 21, 1981 that sent Colorado's second-round pick in 1982 NHL Entry Draft and Boston's option to swap first-round picks in 1982 NHL Entry Draft to Boston in exchange for Boston's tenth-round pick in 1982 NHL Entry Draft. It was a compensation trade that saw Colorado sign restricted free agent Dwight Foster. The Colorado Rockies relocated to New Jersey to become the Devils for the 1982–83 NHL season.

=== Round two ===
#	Player	Nationality	NHL team	College/junior/club team
22	Brian Curran (D)	Canada	Boston Bruins (from New Jersey)^{1}	Portland (WHL)
23	Yves Courteau (RW)	Canada	Detroit Red Wings	Laval Voisins (QMJHL)
24	Gary Leeman (D)	Canada	Toronto Maple Leafs	Regina Pats (WHL)
25	Peter Ihnacak (C)	Czechoslovakia	Toronto Maple Leafs (from Hartford via Philadelphia)^{2}	Prague Sparta (Czechoslovakia)
26	Mike Anderson (C)	United States	Buffalo Sabres (from Washington)^{3}	North St. Paul High School (USHS-MN)
27	Mike Heidt (D)	Canada	Los Angeles Kings	Calgary Wranglers (WHL)
28	Rene Badeau (D)	Canada	Chicago Black Hawks	Quebec Remparts (QMJHL)
29	Dave Reierson (D)	Canada	Calgary Flames (from St. Louis via Minnesota)^{4}	Prince Albert Raiders (SJHL)
30	Jens Johansson (D)	Sweden	Buffalo Sabres (from Calgary)^{5}	Pitea (Sweden)
31	Jocelyn Gauvreau (D)	Canada	Montreal Canadiens (from Pittsburgh)^{6}	Granby Bisons (QMJHL)
32	Kent Carlson (D)	United States	Montreal Canadiens (from Vancouver via Minnesota)^{7}	St. Lawrence University (ECAC)
33	David Maley (LW)	United States	Montreal Canadiens (from Winnipeg)^{8}	Edina High School (USHS-MN)
34	Paul Gillis (C)	Canada	Quebec Nordiques	Niagara Falls Flyers (OHL)
35	Mark Paterson (D)	Canada	Hartford Whalers (from Philadelphia)^{9}	Ottawa 67's (OHL)
36	Tomas Sandstrom (RW)	Sweden	New York Rangers	Fagersta (Sweden)
37	Richard Kromm (LW)	Canada	Calgary Flames (from Buffalo)^{10}	Portland Winter Hawks (WHL)
38	Tim Hrynewich (LW)	Canada	Pittsburgh Penguins (from Minnesota)^{11}	Sudbury Wolves (OHL)
39	Lyndon Byers (RW)	Canada	Boston Bruins	Regina Pats (WHL)
40	Scott Sandelin (D)	United States	Montreal Canadiens	Hibbing High School (USHS-MN)
41	Steve Graves (LW)	Canada	Edmonton Oilers	Sault Ste. Marie Greyhounds (OHL)
42	Vern Smith (D)	Canada	New York Islanders	Lethbridge Broncos (WHL)
^{Reference: "1982 NHL Entry Draft hockeydraftcentral.com".}

1. The New Jersey Devils' second-round pick went to the Boston Bruins as the result of a compensation trade on July 21, 1981 when Colorado signed restricted free agent Dwight Foster. To complete the trade, Boston's tenth-round pick in 1982 NHL Entry Draft was sent to Colorado in exchange for Boston's option to swap first-round picks in 1982 NHL Entry Draft and this pick. The Colorado Rockies relocated to New Jersey to become the Devils for the 1982–83 NHL season.
2. The Philadelphia Flyers' second-round pick went to the Toronto Maple Leafs as the result of a trade on January 20, 1982 that sent Darryl Sittler to Philadelphia in exchange for Rich Costello, future considerations (Ken Strong) and this pick.
  Philadelphia previously acquired this pick as the result of a trade on November 21, 1980 that sent Norm Barnes and Jack McIlhargey to Hartford in exchange for this pick.
3. The Washington Capitals' second-round pick went to the Buffalo Sabres as the result of a trade on June 9, 1982 that sent Alan Haworth and Buffalo's third-round pick in 1982 NHL Entry Draft to Washington in exchange for Washington's fourth-round picks in 1982 NHL Entry Draft and this pick.
4. The Minnesota North Stars' second-round pick went to the Calgary Flames as the result of a trade on June 7, 1982 that sent Willi Plett and Calgary's fourth-round pick in 1982 NHL Entry Draft to Minnesota in exchange for Steve Christoff, Bill Nyrop and this pick.
  Minnesota previously acquired this pick as the result of a trade on June 10, 1979 that sent Richie Hansen and Bryan Maxwell to St. Louis in exchange for this pick.
5. The Calgary Flames' second-round pick went to the Buffalo Sabres as the result of a trade on June 8, 1982 that sent Richie Dunn, Don Edwards and Buffalo's second-round pick in 1982 NHL Entry Draft to Calgary in exchange for Calgary's first-round pick in 1982 NHL Entry Draft, second-round pick in 1983 NHL entry draft, Buffalo's option to swap first-round picks in 1983 NHL entry draft and this pick.
6. The Pittsburgh Penguins' second-round pick went to the Montreal Canadiens as the result of a trade on August 30, 1979 that sent Robert Holland and Pat Hughes to Pittsburgh in exchange for Denis Herron and this pick.
7. The Minnesota North Stars' second-round pick went to the Montreal Canadiens as the result of a trade on August 8, 1979 that sent Bill Nyrop to Minnesota in exchange for Minnesota's second-round pick in 1979 NHL entry draft and second-round pick in 1980 NHL entry draft. The trade was later changed for this pick on June 11, 1980 (1980 NHL entry draft day).
  Minnesota previously acquired this pick as the result of a trade on January 4, 1980 that sent Kris Manery to Vancouver in exchange for this pick.
8. The Winnipeg Jets' second-round pick went to the Montreal Canadiens as the result of a trade on September 26, 1980 that sent Norm Dupont to Winnipeg in exchange for this pick.
9. The Philadelphia Flyers' second-round pick went to the Hartford Whalers as the result of a trade on July 3, 1981 that sent Ray Allison, Fred Arthur, Hartford's first-round and third-round in 1982 NHL Entry Draft to Philadelphia in exchange for Don Gillen, Rick MacLeish, Fred Arthur, Philadelphia's first-round and third-round in 1982 NHL Entry Draft with this pick.
10. The Buffalo Sabres' second-round pick went to the Calgary Flames as the result of a trade on June 8, 1982 that sent Calgary's first-round and second-round picks in 1982 NHL Entry Draft, second-round pick in 1983 NHL entry draft along with Buffalo's option to swap first-round picks in 1983 NHL entry draft to Buffalo in exchange for Richie Dunn, Don Edwards and this pick.
11. The Minnesota North Stars' second-round pick went to the Pittsburgh Penguins as the result of a trade on March 2, 1982 that sent Mark Johnson to Minnesota in exchange for this pick.

=== Round three ===
#	Player	Nationality	NHL team	College/junior/club team
43	Pat Verbeek (C)	Canada	New Jersey	Sudbury Wolves (OHL)
44	Carmine Vani (LW)	Canada	Detroit Red Wings	Kingston Canadians (OHL)
45	Ken Wregget (G)	Canada	Toronto Maple Leafs	Lethbridge Broncos (WHL)
46	Miroslav Dvorak (D)	Czechoslovakia	Philadelphia Flyers (from Hartford)^{1}	Ceske Budejovice (Czechoslovakia)
47	Bill Campbell (D)	Canada	Philadelphia Flyers (from Washington)^{2}	Montreal Juniors (QMJHL)
48	Steve Seguin (RW)	Canada	Los Angeles Kings	Kingston Canadians (OHL)
49	Tom McMurchy (RW)	Canada	Chicago Black Hawks	Brandon Wheat Kings (WHL)
50	Mike Posavad (D)	Canada	St. Louis Blues	Peterborough Petes (OHL)
51	Jim Laing (D)	United States	Calgary Flames	Clarkson University (ECAC)
52	Troy Loney (LW)	Canada	Pittsburgh Penguins	Lethbridge Broncos (WHL)
53	Yves Lapointe (LW)	Canada	Vancouver Canucks	Shawinigan Cataractes (QMJHL)
54	Dave Kasper (C)	Canada	New Jersey (from Winnipeg)^{3}	Sherbrooke Castors (QMJHL)
55	Mario Gosselin (G)	Canada	Quebec Nordiques	Shawinigan Cataractes (QMJHL)
56	Kevin Dineen (RW)	Canada	Hartford Whalers (from Philadelphia)^{4}	University of Denver (WCHA)
57	Corey Millen (C)	United States	New York Rangers	Cloquet High School (USHS-MN)
58	Milan Novy (C)	Czechoslovakia	Washington Capitals (from Buffalo)^{5}	Kladno (Czechoslovakia)
59	Wally Chapman (C)	United States	Minnesota North Stars (from Minnesota via Edmonton)^{6}	Edina High School (USHS-MN)
60	Dave Reid (LW)	Canada	Boston Bruins	Peterborough Petes (OHL)
61	Scott Harlow (LW)	United States	Montreal Canadiens	East Bridgewater High School (USHS-MA)
62	Brent Loney (LW)	Canada	Edmonton Oilers	Cornwall Royals (OHL)
63	Garry Lacey (LW)	Canada	New York Islanders	Toronto Marlboros (OHL)
^{Reference: "1982 NHL Entry Draft hockeydraftcentral.com".}

1. The Hartford Whalers' third-round pick went to the Philadelphia Flyers as the result of a trade on July 3, 1981 that sent Don Gillen, Rick MacLeish, Fred Arthur, Philadelphia's first-round, second-round and third-round in 1982 NHL Entry Draft to Hartford in exchange for Ray Allison, Fred Arthur, Hartford's first-round in 1982 NHL Entry Draft and this pick.
2. The Washington Capitals' third-round pick went to the Philadelphia Flyers as the result of a trade on August 21, 1980 that sent Bob Kelly to Washington in exchange for this pick.
3. The Winnipeg Jets' third-round pick went to the New Jersey Devils as the result of a trade on July 15, 1981 that sent Lucien DeBlois to Winnipeg in exchange for Brent Ashton and this pick.
4. The Philadelphia Flyers' third-round pick went to the Hartford Whalers as the result of a trade on July 3, 1981 that sent Ray Allison, Fred Arthur, Hartford's first-round and third-round in 1982 NHL Entry Draft to Philadelphia in exchange for Don Gillen, Rick MacLeish, Fred Arthur, Philadelphia's first-round and second-round in 1982 NHL Entry Draft with this pick.
5. The Buffalo Sabres' third-round pick went to the Washington Capitals as the result of a trade on June 9, 1982 that sent Washington's second-round and fourth-round picks in 1982 NHL Entry Draft to Buffalo in exchange for Alan Haworth and this pick.
6. The Minnesota North Stars' third-round pick was re-acquired on draft day to complete a trade on February 2, 1981 that sent Gary Edwards to Edmonton in exchange for future considerations.
  Edmonton previously acquired this pick as the result of a trade on August 21, 1981 that sent rights to Don Murdoch to Minnesota in exchange for Don Jackson and this pick.

=== Round four ===
#	Player	Nationality	NHL team	College/junior/club team
64	Dave Gans (C)	Canada	Los Angeles Kings (from New Jersey)^{1}	Oshawa Generals (OHL)
65	Dave Meszaros (G)	Canada	Calgary Flames (from Detroit)^{2}	Toronto Marlboros (OHL)
66	Craig Coxe (C)	United States	Detroit Red Wings (from Toronto)^{3}	St. Albert Saints (AJHL)
67	Ulf Samuelsson (D)	Sweden	Hartford Whalers	Leksand (Sweden)
68	Timo Jutila (D)	Finland	Buffalo Sabres (from Washington)^{4}	Tampere Tappara (Finland)
69	John DeVoe (RW)	United States	Montreal Canadiens (from Los Angeles)^{5}	Edina High School (USHS-MN)
70	Bill Watson (RW)	Canada	Chicago Black Hawks	Prince Albert Raiders (SJHL)
71	Shawn Kilroy (G)	Canada	Vancouver Canucks (from St. Louis)^{6}	Peterborough Petes (OHL)
72	Mark Lamb (LW)	Canada	Calgary Flames	Billings Bighorns (WHL)
73	Vladimir Ruzicka (C)	Czechoslovakia	Toronto Maple Leafs (from Pittsburgh)^{7}	Litvinov (Czechoslovakia)
74	Tom Martin (LW)	Canada	Winnipeg Jets (from Vancouver)^{8}	Kelowna Buckaroos (BCJHL)
75	David Ellett (D)	Canada	Winnipeg Jets	Ottawa 67's (COJHL)
76	Jiri Lala (RW)	Czechoslovakia	Quebec Nordiques	Jihlava (Czechoslovakia)
77	Michael Hjalm (LW)	Sweden	Philadelphia Flyers	Ornskoldsvik (Sweden)
78	Chris Jensen (RW)	Canada	New York Rangers	Kelowna Buckaroos (BCJHL)
79	Jeff Hamilton (C)	Canada	Buffalo Sabres	Providence College (ECAC)
80	Bob Rouse (D)	Canada	Minnesota North Stars	Billings Bighorns (WHL)
81	Dusan Pasek (C)	Czechoslovakia	Minnesota North Stars (from Boston via Calgary)^{9}	Slovan Bratislava (Czechoslovakia)
82	Dave Ross (G)	Canada	Los Angeles Kings (from Montreal)^{10}	Seattle Breakers (WHL)
83	Jaroslav Pouzar (LW)	Czechoslovakia	Edmonton Oilers	Ceske Budejovice (Czechoslovakia)
84	Alan Kerr (LW)	Canada	New York Islanders	Seattle Breakers (WHL)
^{Reference: "1982 NHL Entry Draft hockeydraftcentral.com".}

1. The New Jersey Devils' fourth-round pick went to the Los Angeles Kings as the result of a trade on November 18, 1978 that sent Nick Beverley to Colorado in exchange for this pick. The Colorado Rockies relocated to New Jersey to become the Devils for the 1982–83 NHL season.
2. The Detroit Red Wings' fourth-round pick went to the Calgary Flames as the result of a trade on November 10, 1981 that sent Eric Vail to Detroit in exchange for Gary McAdam and this pick.
3. The Toronto Maple Leafs' fourth-round pick went to the Detroit Red Wings as the result of a trade on March 8, 1982 that sent Jim Korn to Toronto in exchange for Toronto's 5th-rd pick in 1983 NHL entry draft and this pick.
4. The Washington Capitals' fourth-round pick went to the Buffalo Sabres as the result of a trade on June 9, 1982 that sent Alan Haworth and Buffalo's third-round pick in 1982 NHL Entry Draft to Washington in exchange for Washington's second-round picks in 1982 NHL Entry Draft and this pick.
5. The Los Angeles Kings' fourth-round pick went to the Montreal Canadiens as the result of a trade on September 14, 1979 that sent Brad Selwood and Montreal's fourth-round pick in 1982 NHL Entry Draft to Los Angeles in exchange for this pick.
6. The St. Louis Blues' fourth-round pick went to the Vancouver Canucks as the result of a trade on March 9, 1982 that sent Glen Hanlon to St. Louis in exchange for Tony Currie, Rick Heinz, Jim Nill and this pick.
7. The Pittsburgh Penguins' fourth-round pick went to the Toronto Maple Leafs as the result of a trade on September 11, 1981 that sent Paul Harrison in exchange for this pick.
8. The Vancouver Canucks' fourth-round pick went to the Winnipeg Jets as the result of a trade on July 15, 1981 that sent the rights to Ivan Hlinka to Vancouver in exchange for Brent Ashton and this pick.
9. The Calgary Flames' fourth-round pick went to the Minnesota North Stars as the result of a trade on June 7, 1982 that sent Steve Christoff, Bill Nyrop and Minnesota's second-round pick in 1982 NHL Entry Draft to Calgary in exchange for Willi Plett and this pick.
  Calgary (Atlanta) previously acquired this pick as the result of a trade on October 23, 1979 that sent Bobby Lalonde to Boston in exchange for this pick.
10. The Montreal Canadiens' fourth-round pick went to the Los Angeles Kings as the result of a trade on September 14, 1979 that sent Los Angeles' fourth-round pick in 1982 NHL Entry Draft to Montreal in exchange for Brad Selwood and this pick.

=== Round five ===
#	Player	Nationality	NHL team	College/junior/club team
85	Scott Brydges (D)	United States	New Jersey	Mariner High School (USHS-MN)
86	Brad Shaw (D)	Canada	Detroit Red Wings	Ottawa (OHL)
87	Eduard Uvira (D)	Czechoslovakia	Toronto Maple Leafs	Jihlava (Czechoslovakia)
88	Ray Ferraro (C)	Canada	Hartford Whalers	Penticton Knights (BCJHL)
89	Dean Evason (C)	Canada	Washington Capitals	Kamloops Blazers (WHL)
90	Darcy Roy (LW)	Canada	Los Angeles Kings	Ottawa 67's (OHL)
91	Brad Beck (D)	Canada	Chicago Black Hawks	Penticton Knights (BCJHL)
92	Scott Machej (LW)	Canada	St. Louis Blues	Calgary Wranglers (WHL)
93	Lou Kiriakou (D)	Canada	Calgary Flames	Toronto Marlboros (OHL)
94	Grant Sasser (C)	United States	Pittsburgh Penguins	Portland Winter Hawks (WHL)
95	Ulf Isaksson (LW)	Sweden	Los Angeles Kings (from Vancouver)^{1}	Solna (Sweden)
96	Tim Mishler (C)	United States	Winnipeg Jets	East Grand Forks High School (USHS-MN)
97	Phil Stanger (D)	Canada	Quebec Nordiques	Seattle Breakers (WHL)
98	Todd Bergen (C)	Canada	Philadelphia Flyers	Prince Albert Raiders (SJHL)
99	Sylvain Charland (LW)	Canada	Toronto Maple Leafs (from the Rangers)^{2}	Shawinigan Cataractes (QMJHL)
100	Bob Logan (LW)	Canada	Buffalo Sabres	West Island Royals (LHJAQ)
101	Marty Wiitala (C)	United States	Minnesota North Stars	Superior High School (USHS-WI)
102	Bob Nicholson (D)	Canada	Boston Bruins	London Knights (OHL)
103	Kevin Houle (LW)	United States	Montreal Canadiens	Acton-Boxborough High School (USHS-MA)
104	Dwayne Boettger (D)	Canada	Edmonton Oilers	Toronto Marlboros (OHL)
105	Rene Breton (C)	Canada	New York Islanders	Granby Bisons (QMJHL)
^{Reference: "1982 NHL Entry Draft hockeydraftcentral.com".}

1. The Vancouver Canucks' fifth-round pick went to the Los Angeles Kings as the result of a trade on March 8, 1981 that sent Doug Halward to Vancouver in exchange for future considerations (Gary Bromley) and this pick.
2. The New York Rangers' fifth-round pick went to the Toronto Maple Leafs as the result of a trade on October 16, 1981 that sent Pat Hickey to the Rangers in exchange for this pick.

=== Round six ===
#	Player	Nationality	NHL team	College/junior/club team
106	Mike Moher (RW)	Canada	New Jersey	Kitchener Rangers (OHL)
107	Claude Vilgrain (C)	Canada	Detroit Red Wings	Laval Voisons (QMJHL)
108	Ron Dreger (LW)	Canada	Toronto Maple Leafs	Saskatoon Blades (WHL)
109	Randy Gilhen (LW)	Canada	Hartford Whalers	Winnipeg Warriors (WHL)
110	Ed Kastelic (RW)	Canada	Washington Capitals	London Knights (OHL)
111	Jeff Parker (D)	United States	Buffalo Sabres (from Los Angeles)^{1}	Mariner High School (USHS-MN)
112	Mark Hatcher (D)	United States	Chicago Black Hawks	Niagara Falls Flyers (OHL)
113	Perry Ganchar (RW)	Canada	St. Louis Blues	Saskatoon Blades (WHL)
114	Jeff Vaive (C)	Canada	Calgary Flames	Ottawa 67's (OHL)
115	Craig Kales (RW)	United States	Toronto Maple Leafs (from Pittsburgh)^{2}	Niagara Falls Flyers (OHL)
116	Taylor Hall (RW)	Canada	Vancouver Canucks	Regina Pats (WHL)
117	Ernie Vargas (C)	United States	Montreal Canadiens (from Winnipeg)^{3}	Coon Rapids High School (USHS-MN)
118	Mats Kihlstrom (D)	Sweden	Calgary Flames (from Quebec via Washington)^{4}	Sodertalje (Sweden)
119	Ron Hextall (G)	Canada	Philadelphia Flyers	Brandon Wheat Kings (WHL)
120	Tony Granato (C)	United States	New York Rangers	Northwood School (USHS-NY)
121	Jakob Gustavsson (G)	Sweden	Buffalo Sabres	Almtuna (Sweden)
122	Todd Carlile (D)	United States	Minnesota North Stars	North St. Paul High School (USHS-MN)
123	Bob Sweeney (C)	United States	Boston Bruins	Acton-Boxborough High School (USHS-MA)
124	Mike Dark (D)	Canada	Montreal Canadiens	Sarnia Legionnaires (WOJHL)
125	Raimo Summanen (LW)	Finland	Edmonton Oilers	Lahti (Finland)
126	Roger Kortko (C)	Canada	New York Islanders	Saskatoon Blades (WHL)
^{Reference: "1982 NHL Entry Draft hockeydraftcentral.com".}

1. The Los Angeles Kings' sixth-round pick went to the Buffalo Sabres as the result of a trade on March 10, 1981 that sent Don Luce to Los Angeles in exchange for cash and this pick.
2. The Pittsburgh Penguins' sixth-round pick went to the Toronto Maple Leafs as the result of a trade on February 3, 1982 that sent Greg Hotham to Pittsburgh in exchange for Pittsburgh's 5th-rd pick in 1983 NHL entry draft and future considerations (this pick).
3. The Winnipeg Jets' sixth-round pick went to the Montreal Canadiens as the result of a compensation trade on December 19, 1981 for signing Serge Savard to Winnipeg in exchange this pick. Savard retired from the NHL on August 12, 1981. The Jets selected him in the NHL waiver draft on October 5, 1981. The trade was completed upon Savard's return to the NHL with the Jets.
4. The Washington Capitals' sixth-round pick went to the Calgary Flames as the result of a trade on June 9, 1982 that sent Ken Houston and Pat Riggin to Washington in exchange for Howard Walker, George White, Washington's third-round pick in 1983 NHL entry draft, second-round pick in 1984 NHL entry draft and this pick.
  Washington previously acquired this pick as the result of a trade on February 1, 1982 that sent Tim Tookey and seventh-round pick in 1982 NHL Entry Draft to Quebec in exchange for Lee Norwood and this pick.

=== Round seven ===
Victor Nechaev, the first Soviet trained player to play professionally in the NHL was selected by the Los Angeles Kings in the seventh round of the 1982 draft.

#	Player	Nationality	NHL team	College/junior/club team
127	Paul Fulcher (LW)	Canada	New Jersey	London Knights (OHL)
128	Greg Hudas (D)	United States	Detroit Red Wings	Redford Royals (NAJHL)
129	Dominic Campedelli (D)	United States	Toronto Maple Leafs	Cohasset High School (USHS-MA)
130	Jim Johannson (C)	United States	Hartford Whalers	Mayo High School (USHS-MN)
131	Daniel Poudrier (D)	Canada	Quebec Nordiques (from Washington)^{1}	Shawinigan Cataractes (QMJHL)
132	Victor Nechayev (C)	Soviet Union	Los Angeles Kings	SKA Leningrad (USSR)
133	Jay Ness (D)	United States	Chicago Black Hawks	Roseau High School (USHS-MN)
134	Doug Gilmour (C)	Canada	St. Louis Blues	Cornwall Royals (OHL)
135	Brad Ramsden (RW)	Canada	Calgary Flames	Peterborough Petes (OHL)
136	Grant Couture (D)	Canada	Pittsburgh Penguins	Lethbridge Broncos (WHL)
137	Parie Proft (D)	Canada	Vancouver Canucks	Calgary Wranglers (WHL)
138	Derek Ray (RW)	United States	Winnipeg Jets	Seattle Americans (NAJHL)
139	Jeff Triano (D)	Canada	Toronto Maple Leafs (from Quebec)^{2}	Toronto Marlboros (OHL)
140	Dave Brown (RW)	Canada	Philadelphia Flyers	Saskatoon Blades (WHL)
141	Sergei Kapustin (LW)	Soviet Union	New York Rangers	Moscow Spartak (USSR)
142	Allen Bishop (D)	Canada	Buffalo Sabres	Niagara Falls Flyers (OHL)
143	Viktor Zhluktov (LW)	Soviet Union	Minnesota North Stars	Moscow CSKA (USSR)
144	John Meulenbroeks (D)	Canada	Boston Bruins	Brantford Alexanders (OHL)
145	Hannu Jarvenpaa (RW)	Finland	Montreal Canadiens	Oulu (Finland)
146	Brian Small (RW)	Canada	Edmonton Oilers	Ottawa 67's (OHL)
147	John Tiano (C)	United States	New York Islanders	Winthrop High School (USHS-MA)
^{Reference: "1982 NHL Entry Draft hockeydraftcentral.com".}

1. The Washington Capitals' seventh-round pick went to the Quebec Nordiques as the result of a trade on February 1, 1982 that sent Lee Norwood and Quebec's sixth-round pick in 1982 NHL Entry Draft to Washington in exchange for Tim Tookey and this pick.
2. The Quebec Nordiques' seventh-round pick went to the Toronto Maple Leafs as the result of a trade on March 9, 1982 that sent Wilf Paiement to Quebec in exchange for Miroslav Frycer and this pick.

=== Round eight ===
#	Player	Nationality	NHL team	College/junior/club team
148	John Hutchings (D)	Canada	New Jersey	Oshawa Generals (OHL)
149	Pat Lahey (C)	Canada	Detroit Red Wings	Windsor Spitfires (OHL)
150	Steve Smith (D)	United States	Montreal Canadiens	St. Lawrence University (ECAC)
151	Mickey Krampotich (C)	United States	Hartford Whalers	Hibbing High School (USHS-MN)
152	Wally Schreiber (RW)	Canada	Washington Capitals	Regina Pats (WHL)
153	Peter Helander (D)	Sweden	Los Angeles Kings	Skelleftea AIK (Sweden)
154	Jeff Smith (LW)	Canada	Chicago Black Hawks	London Knights (OHL)
155	Chris Delaney (LW)	United States	St. Louis Blues	Boston College (ECAC)
156	Roy Myllari (D)	Canada	Calgary Flames	Cornwall Royals (OHL)
157	Peter Derksen (LW)	Canada	Pittsburgh Penguins	Portland Winter Hawks (WHL)
158	Newell Brown (C)	Canada	Vancouver Canucks	Michigan State University (CCHA)
159	Guy Gosselin (D)	United States	Winnipeg Jets	Rochester-Marshall High School (USHS-MN)
160	Brian Glynn (C)	United States	New York Rangers (from Quebec)^{1}	Buffalo Jr. Sabres (NAJHL)
161	Alain Lavigne (RW)	Canada	Philadelphia Flyers	Shawinigan Cataractes (QMJHL)
162	Janne Karlsson (D)	Sweden	New York Rangers	Kiruna (Sweden)
163	Claude Verret (C)	Canada	Buffalo Sabres	Trois-Rivieres Draveurs (QMJHL)
164	Paul Miller (D)	United States	Minnesota North Stars	Crookston High School (USHS-MN)
165	Tony Fiore (C)	Canada	Boston Bruins	Montreal Juniors (QMJHL)
166	Tom Kolioupoulos (RW)	United States	Montreal Canadiens	Fraser High School (USHS-MI)
167	Dean Clark (D)	Canada	Edmonton Oilers	St. Albert Saints (AJHL)
168	Todd Okerlund (RW)	United States	New York Islanders	Burnsville High School (USHS-MN)
^{Reference: "1982 NHL Entry Draft hockeydraftcentral.com".}

1. The Quebec Nordiques' eight-round pick went to the New York Rangers as the result of a trade on December 30, 1981 that sent Jere Gillis and Dean Talafous to Quebec in exchange for Robbie Ftorek and this pick. Dean Talafous did not report to Quebec and retired from hockey. Pat Hickey was substituted to complete the trade after an arbitrator's decision on March 8, 1982.

=== Round nine ===
#	Player	Nationality	NHL team	College/junior/club team
169	Alan Hepple (D)	United Kingdom	New Jersey	Ottawa 67's (OHL)
170	Gary Cullen (C)	Canada	Detroit Red Wings	Cornell University (ECAC)
171	Miroslav Ihnacak (RW)	Czechoslovakia	Toronto Maple Leafs	Kosice (Czechoslovakia)
172	Kevin Skilliter (D)	Canada	Hartford Whalers	Cornwall Royals (OHL)
173	Jamie Reeve (G)	Canada	Washington Capitals	Saskatoon Blades (SJHL)
174	Dave Chartier (D)	Canada	Los Angeles Kings	Saskatoon Blades (WHL)
175	Phil Patterson (RW)	Canada	Chicago Black Hawks	Ottawa 67's (OHL)
176	Matt Christensen (C)	United States	St. Louis Blues	Aurora-Hoyt Lakes High School (USHS-MN)
177	Ted Pearson (LW)	Canada	Calgary Flames	University of Wisconsin (WCHA)
178	Greg Gravel (C)	Canada	Pittsburgh Penguins	Windsor Spitfires (OHL)
179	Don McLaren (RW)	Canada	Vancouver Canucks	Ottawa 67's (OHL)
180	Tom Ward (D)	United States	Winnipeg Jets	Richfield High School (USHS-MN)
181	Mike Hough (LW)	Canada	Quebec Nordiques	Kitchener Rangers (OHL)
182	Magnus Roupe (LW)	Sweden	Philadelphia Flyers	Karlstad (Sweden)
183	Kelly Miller (LW)	United States	New York Rangers	Michigan State University (CCHA)
184	Rob Norman (RW)	Canada	Buffalo Sabres	Cornwall Royals (OHL)
185	Pat Micheletti (C)	United States	Minnesota North Stars	Hibbing High School (USHS-MN)
186	Doug Kostynski (C)	Canada	Boston Bruins	Kamloops Blazers (WHL)
187	Brian Williams (C)	United States	Montreal Canadiens	Sioux City Musketeers (USHL)
188	Ian Wood (C)	Canada	Edmonton Oilers	Penticton Knights (BCJHL)
189	Gord Paddock (D)	Canada	New York Islanders	Saskatoon Blades (WHL)
^{Reference: "1982 NHL Entry Draft hockeydraftcentral.com".}

=== Round ten ===
#	Player	Nationality	NHL team	College/junior/club team
190	Brent Shaw (RW)	Canada	New Jersey	Seattle Breakers (WHL)
191	Brent Meckling (D)	Canada	Detroit Red Wings	Calgary Canucks (AJHL)
192	Leigh Verstraete (RW)	Canada	Toronto Maple Leafs	Calgary Wranglers (WHL)
193	Simo Saarinen (D)	Finland	New York Rangers (from Hartford)^{1}	Helsinki IFK (Finland)
194	Juha Nurmi (C)	Finland	Washington Capitals	Tampere Tappara (Finland)
195	John Franzosa (G)	United States	Los Angeles Kings	Brown University (ECAC)
196	Jim Camazzola (LW)	Canada	Chicago Black Hawks	Penticton Knights (BCJHL)
197	John Shumski (C)	United States	St. Louis Blues	Rennssaeler Polytechnic Institute (ECAC)
198	Jim Uens (C)	Canada	Calgary Flames	Oshawa Generals (OHL)
199	Stu Wenaas (D)	Canada	Pittsburgh Penguins	Winnipeg Warriors (WHL)
200	Al Raymond (LW)	Canada	Vancouver Canucks	Niagara Falls Flyers (OHL)
201	Mike Savage (LW)	Canada	Winnipeg Jets	Sudbury Wolves (OHL)
202	Vincent Lukac (RW)	Czechoslovakia	Quebec Nordiques	Jihlava (Czechoslovakia)
203	Tom Allen (G)	United States	Philadelphia Flyers	Michigan Technological University (CCHA)
204	Bob Lowes (C)	Canada	New York Rangers	Prince Albert Raiders (SJHL)
205	Mike Craig (G)	Canada	Buffalo Sabres	Billings Bighorns (WHL)
206	Arnold Kadlec (D)	Czechoslovakia	Minnesota North Stars	Litvinov (Czechoslovakia)
207	Tony Gilliard (LW)	Canada	New Jersey Devils (from Boston)^{2}	Niagara Falls Flyers (OHL)
208	Bob Emery (D)	United States	Montreal Canadiens	Matignon High School (USHS-MA)
209	Grant Dion (D)	Canada	Edmonton Oilers	Cowichan Valley Capitals (BCJHL)
210	Eric Faust (D)	Canada	New York Islanders	Henry Carr Crusaders (MetJHL)
^{Reference: "1982 NHL Entry Draft hockeydraftcentral.com".}

1. The Hartford Whalers' tenth-round pick went to the New York Rangers as the result of a trade on October 2, 1981 that sent Chris Kotsopoulos, Gerry McDonald and Doug Sulliman to Hartford in exchange for Mike Rogers and this pick.
2. The Boston Bruins' tenth-round pick went to the New Jersey Devils as the result of a compensation trade on July 21, 1981 for Colorado signing restricted free agent Dwight Foster. To compete the trade, Colorado's sent a second-round pick in 1982 NHL Entry Draft and Boston's option to swap first-round picks in 1982 NHL Entry Draft to Boston in exchange for this pick. The Colorado Rockies relocated to New Jersey to become the Devils for the 1982–83 NHL season.

=== Round eleven ===
#	Player	Nationality	NHL team	College/junior/club team
211	Scott Fusco (C)	United States	New Jersey	Harvard University (ECAC)
212	Mike Stern (LW)	Canada	Detroit Red Wings	Oshawa Generals (OHL)
213	Tim Loven (D)	United States	Toronto Maple Leafs	Red River High School (USHS-ND)
214	Martin Linse (C)	Sweden	Hartford Whalers	Djurgardens IF (Sweden)
215	Wayne Prestage (C)	Canada	Washington Capitals	Seattle Breakers (WHL)
216	Ray Shero (LW)	United States	Los Angeles Kings	St. Lawrence University (ECAC)
217	Mike James (D)	Canada	Chicago Black Hawks	Ottawa Generals (OHL)
218	Brian Ahern (LW)	United States	St. Louis Blues	Sibley High School (USHS-MN)
219	Rick Erdall (C)	United States	Calgary Flames	University of Minnesota (WCHA)
220	Chris McCauley (RW)	Canada	Pittsburgh Penguins	London Knights (OHL)
221	Steve Driscoll (LW)	Canada	Vancouver Canucks	Cornwall Royals (OHL)
222	Bob Shaw (RW)	Canada	Winnipeg Jets	Penticton Knights (BCJHL)
223	Andre Martin (D)	Canada	Quebec Nordiques	Montreal Juniors (QMJHL)
224	Rick Gal (C)	Canada	Philadelphia Flyers	Lethbridge Broncos (WHL)
225	Andy Otto (D)	United States	New York Rangers	Northwood School (USHS-NY)
226	Jim Plankers (D)	United States	Buffalo Sabres	Cloquet High School (USHS-MN)
227	Scott Knutson (C)	United States	Minnesota North Stars	Warroad High School (USHS-MN)
228	Tommy Lehmann (C)	Sweden	Boston Bruins	Stocksund (Sweden)
229	Darren Acheson (C)	Canada	Montreal Canadiens	Fort Saskatchewan Traders (AJHL)
230	Chris Smith (G)	Canada	Edmonton Oilers	Regina Pats (WHL)
231	Pat Goff (D)	United States	New York Islanders	Ramsey High School (USHS-MN)
^{Reference: "1982 NHL Entry Draft hockeydraftcentral.com".}

=== Round twelve ===
#	Player	Nationality	NHL team	College/junior/club team
232	Dan Dorion (RW)	United States	New Jersey	Austin Mavericks (USHL)
233	Shaun Reagan (RW)	Canada	Detroit Red Wings	Brantford Alexanders (OHL)
234	Jim Appleby (G)	Canada	Toronto Maple Leafs	Winnipeg Warriors (WHL)
235	Randy Cameron (D)	Canada	Hartford Whalers	Winnipeg Warriors (WHL)
236	Jon Holden (G)	Canada	Washington Capitals	Peterborough Petes (OHL)
237	Mats Ulander (LW)	Sweden	Los Angeles Kings	Solna (Sweden)
238	Bob Andrea (D)	Canada	Chicago Black Hawks	Dartmouth Arrows (NSJHL)
239	Peter Smith (G)	United States	St. Louis Blues	University of Maine (ECAC)
240	Dale Thompson (RW)	Canada	Calgary Flames	Calgary Canucks (AJHL)
241	Stan Bautch (G)	United States	Pittsburgh Penguins	Hibbing High School (USHS-MN)
242	Shawn Green (RW)	Canada	Vancouver Canucks	Victoria Cougars (WHL)
243	Jan Ericson (LW)	Sweden	Winnipeg Jets	Solna (Sweden)
244	Jozef Lukac (LW)	Czechoslovakia	Quebec Nordiques	Kosice (Czechoslovakia)
245	Mark Vichorek (D)	United States	Philadelphia Flyers	Sioux City Musketeers (USHL)
246	Dwayne Robinson (D)	Canada	New York Rangers	University of New Hampshire (ECAC)
247	Marco Kallas (C)	United States	Washington Capitals (from Buffalo)^{1}	St. Louis Sting (NAJHL)
248	Jan Jasko (LW)	Czechoslovakia	Quebec Nordiques (from Minnesota)^{2}	Slovan Bratislava (Czechoslovakia)
249	Bruno Campese (G)	Canada	Boston Bruins	Northern Michigan University (CCHA)
250	Bill Brauer (D)	United States	Montreal Canadiens	Edina High School (USHS-MN)
251	Jeff Crawford (LW)	Canada	Edmonton Oilers	Regina Pats (WHL)
252	Jim Koudys (D)	Canada	New York Islanders	Sudbury Wolves (OHL)
^{Reference: "1982 NHL Entry Draft hockeydraftcentral.com".}

1. The Buffalo Sabres' twelfth-round pick went to the Washington Capitals as the result of a trade on June 9, 1982 that sent Washington's 12th-rd pick in 1983 NHL entry draft to Buffalo in exchange for this pick.
2. The Minnesota North Stars' twelfth-round pick went to the Quebec Nordiques as the result of a trade on June 9, 1982 that sent Quebec's 11th-rd pick in 1983 NHL entry draft to Minnesota in exchange for this pick.

= NHL All-Star team ·	= NHL All-Star ·	= NHL All-Star and NHL All-Star team ·	= Hall of Famers

== Draftees based on nationality ==
Rank	Country	Amount
	North America	217
1	Canada	156
2	United States	61
	Europe	35
3	Sweden	14
4	Czechoslovakia	13
5	Finland	5
6	Soviet Union	3

== See also ==
- 1982–83 NHL season
- List of NHL players
