= List of Hartford Whalers draft picks =

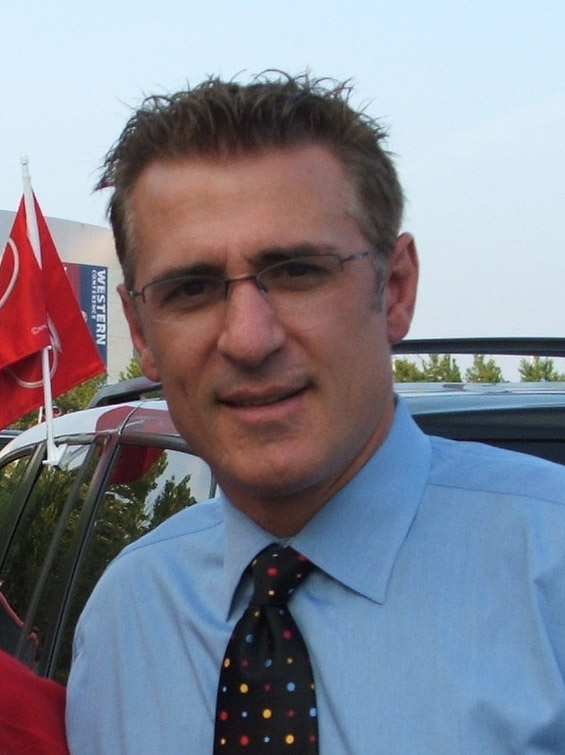
The Whalers selected Ron Francis 4th overall in the 1981 NHL entry draft.

This is a complete list of ice hockey players who were drafted in the National Hockey League Entry Draft by the Hartford Whalers franchise. It includes every player who was drafted, regardless of whether they played for the team.

== Key ==
# Played at least one game with the Whalers
↑ Spent entire NHL career with the Whalers
(†) Inducted into the Hockey Hall of Fame

General terms and abbreviations
| Term or abbreviation | Definition |
|---|---|
| Draft | The year that the player was selected |
| Round | The round of the draft in which the player was selected |
| Pick | The overall position in the draft at which the player was selected |
| S | Supplemental draft selection |

Position abbreviations
| Abbreviation | Definition |
|---|---|
| G | Goaltender |
| D | Defense |
| LW | Left wing |
| C | Center |
| RW | Right wing |
| F | Forward |

Abbreviations for statistical columns
| Abbreviation | Definition |
|---|---|
| Pos | Position |
| GP | Games played |
| G | Goals |
| A | Assists |
| Pts | Points |
| PIM | Penalties in minutes |
| W | Wins |
| L | Losses |
| T | Ties |
| OT | Overtime/shootout losses |
| GAA | Goals against average |
| — | Does not apply |

== Draft picks ==
=== WHA ===
Statistics show each player's career regular season totals in the WHA.

| Year | Round | Pick | Player | Nationality | Pos | GP | G | A | Pts | PIM | W | L | T | GAA |
|---|---|---|---|---|---|---|---|---|---|---|---|---|---|---|
| 1973 | 1 | 2 | Glenn Goldup | Canada | F | — | — | — | — | — | — | — | — | — |
| 1973 | 1 | 12 | Blake Dunlop | Canada | F | — | — | — | — | — | — | — | — | — |
| 1973 | 2 | 26 | Mike Clarke | Canada | C | — | — | — | — | — | — | — | — | — |
| 1973 | 3 | 38 | Tom Colley | Canada | C | — | — | — | — | — | — | — | — | — |
| 1973 | 4 | 41 | Randy Holt | Canada | D | — | — | — | — | — | — | — | — | — |
| 1973 | 4 | 51 | Alan Hangsleben↑ | United States | D | 334 | 36 | 73 | 109 | 437 | — | — | — | — |
| 1973 | 5 | 53 | Larry Patey | Canada | C | — | — | — | — | — | — | — | — | — |
| 1973 | 5 | 64 | Cap Raeder↑ | United States | G | 29 | 0 | 0 | 0 | 2 | 12 | 11 | 1 | 3.24 |
| 1973 | 6 | 77 | Rick Chinnick | Canada | F | — | — | — | — | — | — | — | — | — |
| 1973 | 7 | 90 | Steve Alley | United States | LW | 105 | 25 | 36 | 61 | 47 | — | — | — | — |
| 1974 | 1 | 13 | Tim Young | Canada | F | — | — | — | — | — | — | — | — | — |
| 1974 | 2 | 28 | Mike Eruzione | United States | LW | — | — | — | — | — | — | — | — | — |
| 1974 | 3 | 43 | Peter Brown | United States | D | — | — | — | — | — | — | — | — | — |
| 1974 | 4 | 58 | Dick Lamby | United States | D | — | — | — | — | — | — | — | — | — |
| 1974 | 5 | 72 | Don McLean | Canada | D | — | — | — | — | — | — | — | — | — |
| 1974 | 6 | 87 | Joe Rando | United States | D | — | — | — | — | — | — | — | — | — |
| 1974 | 7 | 102 | Brian Walsh | United States | RW | 5 | 0 | 2 | 2 | 12 | — | — | — | — |
| 1974 | 8 | 117 | John Nazar | Canada | LW | — | — | — | — | — | — | — | — | — |
| 1974 | 9 | 132 | Warren Miller# | United States | F | 238 | 65 | 83 | 148 | 163 | — | — | — | — |
| 1974 | 10 | 145 | Tony White | Canada | F | — | — | — | — | — | — | — | — | — |
| 1974 | 11 | 187 | Robbie Moore | Canada | G | — | — | — | — | — | — | — | — | — |
| 1974 | 12 | 200 | Cliff Cox | Canada | F | — | — | — | — | — | — | — | — | — |
| 1974 | 13 | 211 | Dave Staffen | Canada | F | — | — | — | — | — | — | — | — | — |
| 1974 | 14 | 219 | Peter Tighe | Canada | D | — | — | — | — | — | — | — | — | — |
| 1974 | 15 | 224 | Brian Durocher | United States | G | — | — | — | — | — | — | — | — | — |
| 1974 | 16 | 228 | Colin Ahern | United States | C | — | — | — | — | — | — | — | — | — |
| 1974 | 17 | 232 | Dwane Byers | Canada | F | — | — | — | — | — | — | — | — | — |
| 1974 | 1 | 14 | Peter Sturgeon | Canada | LW | — | — | — | — | — | — | — | — | — |
| 1974 | 2 | 29 | Michel Deziel | Canada | LW | — | — | — | — | — | — | — | — | — |
| 1975 | 1 | 13 | Terry McDonald | Canada | C | — | — | — | — | — | — | — | — | — |
| 1975 | 2 | 28 | Danny Arndt# | Canada | LW | 120 | 16 | 23 | 39 | 21 | — | — | — | — |
| 1975 | 3 | 43 | Matti Hagman | Finland | C | 53 | 25 | 31 | 56 | 16 | — | — | — | — |
| 1975 | 4 | 58 | Derek Spring | Canada | F | — | — | — | — | — | — | — | — | — |
| 1975 | 5 | 72 | Gary McFadyen | Canada | RW | — | — | — | — | — | — | — | — | — |
| 1975 | 6 | 86 | Terry Martin | Canada | F | — | — | — | — | — | — | — | — | — |
| 1975 | 7 | 99 | John Tweedle | Canada | F | — | — | — | — | — | — | — | — | — |
| 1975 | 8 | 111 | Mike Harazny | Canada | D | — | — | — | — | — | — | — | — | — |
| 1975 | 9 | 123 | Dave Norris | Canada | LW | — | — | — | — | — | — | — | — | — |
| 1975 | 10 | 136 | Paul Stevenson | Canada | | — | — | — | — | — | — | — | — | — |
| 1975 | 11 | 149 | Clark Jantzie | Canada | F | — | — | — | — | — | — | — | — | — |
| 1976 | 2 | 13 | Mike Fidler | United States | LW | — | — | — | — | — | — | — | — | — |
| 1976 | 3 | 26 | Fred Williams | Canada | C | — | — | — | — | — | — | — | — | — |
| 1976 | 3 | 31 | Dave Debol | United States | C | 68 | 13 | 29 | 42 | 11 | — | — | — | — |
| 1976 | 4 | 38 | Mike Kaszycki | Canada | F | — | — | — | — | — | — | — | — | — |
| 1976 | 5 | 49 | Bill Baker | United States | D | — | — | — | — | — | — | — | — | — |
| 1976 | 5 | 50 | Mike Liut | Canada | G | 81 | 0 | 3 | 3 | 9 | 31 | 39 | 4 | 3.69 |
| 1976 | 6 | 62 | Dwight Schofield | Canada | D | — | — | — | — | — | — | — | — | — |
| 1976 | 7 | 74 | Warren Young | Canada | F | — | — | — | — | — | — | — | — | — |
| 1976 | 8 | 86 | Ken Morrow | United States | D | — | — | — | — | — | — | — | — | — |
| 1976 | 9 | 97 | Ed Clarey | Canada | F | — | — | — | — | — | — | — | — | — |
| 1976 | 10 | 108 | Jon Hammond | Canada | LW | — | — | — | — | — | — | — | — | — |
| 1977 | 2 | 15 | Moe Robinson | Canada | D | — | — | — | — | — | — | — | — | — |
| 1977 | 2 | 19 | Randy Pierce | Canada | RW | — | — | — | — | — | — | — | — | — |
| 1977 | 3 | 23 | John Baby | Canada | D | — | — | — | — | — | — | — | — | — |
| 1977 | 5 | 43 | Brian Hill | Canada | RW | — | — | — | — | — | — | — | — | — |
| 1977 | 6 | 52 | Jim Korn | United States | D | — | — | — | — | — | — | — | — | — |

=== NHL ===
| Year | Round | Pick | Player | Nationality | Pos | GP | G | A | Pts | PIM | W | L | T | OT | GAA |
|---|---|---|---|---|---|---|---|---|---|---|---|---|---|---|---|
| 1979 | 1 | 18 | Ray Allison# | Canada | RW | 238 | 64 | 93 | 157 | 223 | — | — | — | — | — |
| 1979 | 2 | 39 | Stuart Smith↑ | Canada | D | 77 | 2 | 10 | 12 | 95 | — | — | — | — | — |
| 1979 | 3 | 60 | Don Nachbaur# | Canada | C | 223 | 23 | 46 | 69 | 465 | — | — | — | — | — |
| 1979 | 4 | 81 | Ray Neufeld# | Canada | RW | 595 | 157 | 200 | 357 | 814 | — | — | — | — | — |
| 1979 | 5 | 102 | Mark Renaud# | Canada | D | 152 | 6 | 50 | 56 | 86 | — | — | — | — | — |
| 1979 | 6 | 123 | Dave McDonald | Canada | LW | — | — | — | — | — | — | — | — | — | — |
| 1980 | 1 | 8 | Fred Arthur# | Canada | D | 80 | 1 | 8 | 9 | 49 | — | — | — | — | — |
| 1980 | 2 | 29 | Michel Galarneau↑ | Canada | C | 78 | 7 | 10 | 17 | 34 | — | — | — | — | — |
| 1980 | 3 | 50 | Mickey Volcan# | Canada | D | 162 | 8 | 33 | 41 | 146 | — | — | — | — | — |
| 1980 | 4 | 71 | Kevin McClelland | Canada | RW | 588 | 68 | 112 | 180 | 1672 | — | — | — | — | — |
| 1980 | 5 | 92 | Darren Jensen | Canada | G | 30 | 0 | 1 | 1 | 2 | 15 | 10 | 1 | — | 3.81 |
| 1980 | 6 | 113 | Mario Cerri | Canada | C | — | — | — | — | — | — | — | — | — | — |
| 1980 | 7 | 134 | Mike Martin | Canada | D | — | — | — | — | — | — | — | — | — | — |
| 1980 | 8 | 155 | Brent Denat | Canada | LW | — | — | — | — | — | — | — | — | — | — |
| 1980 | 9 | 176 | Paul Fricker | Canada | G | — | — | — | — | — | — | — | — | — | — |
| 1980 | 10 | 197 | Lorne Bokshowan | Canada | C | — | — | — | — | — | — | — | — | — | — |
| 1981 | 1 | 4 | Ron Francis#† | Canada | C | 1731 | 549 | 1249 | 1798 | 979 | — | — | — | — | — |
| 1981 | 3 | 61 | Paul MacDermid# | Canada | RW | 690 | 116 | 141 | 257 | 1303 | — | — | — | — | — |
| 1981 | 4 | 67 | Mike Hoffman↑ | Canada | LW | 9 | 1 | 3 | 4 | 2 | — | — | — | — | — |
| 1981 | 5 | 93 | Bill Maguire | Canada | D | — | — | — | — | — | — | — | — | — | — |
| 1981 | 5 | 103 | Dan Bourbonnais↑ | Canada | LW | 59 | 3 | 25 | 28 | 11 | — | — | — | — | — |
| 1981 | 7 | 130 | John Mokosak | Canada | D | 41 | 0 | 2 | 2 | 96 | — | — | — | — | — |
| 1981 | 8 | 151 | Denis Dore | Canada | RW | — | — | — | — | — | — | — | — | — | — |
| 1981 | 9 | 172 | Jeff Poeschl | United States | G | — | — | — | — | — | — | — | — | — | — |
| 1981 | 10 | 193 | Larry Power | Canada | C | — | — | — | — | — | — | — | — | — | — |
| 1982 | 1 | 14 | Paul Lawless# | Canada | LW | 238 | 49 | 77 | 126 | 54 | — | — | — | — | — |
| 1982 | 2 | 35 | Mark Paterson↑ | Canada | D | 29 | 3 | 3 | 6 | 33 | — | — | — | — | — |
| 1982 | 3 | 56 | Kevin Dineen# | Canada | RW | 1188 | 355 | 405 | 760 | 2229 | — | — | — | — | — |
| 1982 | 4 | 67 | Ulf Samuelsson# | Sweden | D | 1080 | 57 | 276 | 333 | 2453 | — | — | — | — | — |
| 1982 | 5 | 88 | Ray Ferraro# | Canada | C | 1258 | 408 | 490 | 898 | 1288 | — | — | — | — | — |
| 1982 | 6 | 109 | Randy Gilhen# | Canada | LW | 457 | 55 | 60 | 115 | 314 | — | — | — | — | — |
| 1982 | 7 | 130 | Jim Johannson | United States | C | — | — | — | — | — | — | — | — | — | — |
| 1982 | 8 | 151 | Mickey Krampotich | United States | LW | — | — | — | — | — | — | — | — | — | — |
| 1982 | 9 | 172 | Kevin Skilliter | Canada | D | — | — | — | — | — | — | — | — | — | — |
| 1982 | 11 | 214 | Martin Linse | Sweden | F | — | — | — | — | — | — | — | — | — | — |
| 1982 | 12 | 235 | Randy Cameron | Canada | D | — | — | — | — | — | — | — | — | — | — |
| 1983 | 1 | 2 | Sylvain Turgeon# | Canada | LW | 669 | 269 | 226 | 495 | 691 | — | — | — | — | — |
| 1983 | 1 | 20 | David Jensen# | United States | F | 69 | 9 | 13 | 22 | 22 | — | — | — | — | — |
| 1983 | 2 | 23 | Ville Siren | Finland | D | 290 | 14 | 68 | 82 | 276 | — | — | — | — | — |
| 1983 | 3 | 61 | Leif Carlsson | Sweden | D | — | — | — | — | — | — | — | — | — | — |
| 1983 | 4 | 64 | Dave MacLean | Canada | RW | — | — | — | — | — | — | — | — | — | — |
| 1983 | 4 | 72 | Ron Chyzowski | Canada | C | — | — | — | — | — | — | — | — | — | — |
| 1983 | 6 | 104 | Brian Johnson | United States | C | — | — | — | — | — | — | — | — | — | — |
| 1983 | 7 | 124 | Joe Reekie | Canada | D | 902 | 25 | 139 | 164 | 1326 | — | — | — | — | — |
| 1983 | 8 | 143 | Chris Duperron | Canada | D | — | — | — | — | — | — | — | — | — | — |
| 1983 | 8 | 144 | Jamie Falle | United States | G | — | — | — | — | — | — | — | — | — | — |
| 1983 | 9 | 164 | Bill Fordy | Canada | LW | — | — | — | — | — | — | — | — | — | — |
| 1983 | 10 | 193 | Reine Landgren | Sweden | LW | — | — | — | — | — | — | — | — | — | — |
| 1983 | 11 | 204 | Allan Acton | Canada | LW | — | — | — | — | — | — | — | — | — | — |
| 1983 | 12 | 224 | Darcy Kaminski | Canada | D | — | — | — | — | — | — | — | — | — | — |
| 1984 | 1 | 11 | Sylvain Cote# | Canada | D | 1171 | 122 | 313 | 435 | 545 | — | — | — | — | — |
| 1984 | 6 | 110 | Mike Millar# | Canada | RW | 78 | 18 | 18 | 36 | 12 | — | — | — | — | — |
| 1984 | 7 | 131 | Mike Vellucci↑ | United States | D | 2 | 0 | 0 | 0 | 11 | — | — | — | — | — |
| 1984 | 9 | 173 | John Devereaux | United States | C | — | — | — | — | — | — | — | — | — | — |
| 1984 | 10 | 193 | Brent Regan | Canada | C | — | — | — | — | — | — | — | — | — | — |
| 1984 | 11 | 214 | Jim Culhane↑ | Canada | D | 6 | 0 | 1 | 1 | 4 | — | — | — | — | — |
| 1984 | 12 | 234 | Peter Abric | Canada | G | — | — | — | — | — | — | — | — | — | — |
| 1985 | 1 | 5 | Dana Murzyn# | Canada | D | 838 | 52 | 152 | 204 | 1571 | — | — | — | — | — |
| 1985 | 2 | 26 | Kay Whitmore# | Canada | G | 155 | 0 | 9 | 9 | 39 | 60 | 64 | 16 | — | 3.55 |
| 1985 | 4 | 68 | Gary Callaghan | Canada | C | — | — | — | — | — | — | — | — | — | — |
| 1985 | 6 | 110 | Shane Churla# | Canada | RW | 488 | 26 | 45 | 71 | 2301 | — | — | — | — | — |
| 1985 | 7 | 131 | Chris Brant | Canada | LW | — | — | — | — | — | — | — | — | — | — |
| 1985 | 8 | 152 | Brian Puhalsky | Canada | LW | — | — | — | — | — | — | — | — | — | — |
| 1985 | 9 | 173 | Greg Dornbach | United States | C | — | — | — | — | — | — | — | — | — | — |
| 1985 | 10 | 194 | Paul Tory | Canada | RW | — | — | — | — | — | — | — | — | — | — |
| 1985 | 11 | 215 | Jerry Pawlowski | United States | D | — | — | — | — | — | — | — | — | — | — |
| 1985 | 12 | 236 | Bruce Hill | Canada | C | — | — | — | — | — | — | — | — | — | — |
| 1986 | 1 | 11 | Scott Young# | United States | RW | 1181 | 342 | 414 | 756 | 448 | — | — | — | — | — |
| 1986 | 2 | 32 | Marc Laforge# | Canada | D | 14 | 0 | 0 | 0 | 64 | — | — | — | — | — |
| 1986 | 4 | 74 | Brian Chapman↑ | Canada | D | 3 | 0 | 0 | 0 | 29 | — | — | — | — | — |
| 1986 | 5 | 95 | Bill Horn | Canada | G | — | — | — | — | — | — | — | — | — | — |
| 1986 | 6 | 116 | Joe Quinn | Canada | RW | — | — | — | — | — | — | — | — | — | — |
| 1986 | 7 | 137 | Steve Torrel | United States | C | — | — | — | — | — | — | — | — | — | — |
| 1986 | 8 | 158 | Ron Hoover | Canada | LW | 18 | 4 | 0 | 4 | 31 | — | — | — | — | — |
| 1986 | 9 | 179 | Rob Glasgow | Canada | F | — | — | — | — | — | — | — | — | — | — |
| 1986 | 10 | 200 | Sean Evoy | Canada | G | — | — | — | — | — | — | — | — | — | — |
| 1986 | 11 | 221 | Cal Brown | Canada | D | — | — | — | — | — | — | — | — | — | — |
| 1986 | 12 | 242 | Brian Verbeek | Canada | C | — | — | — | — | — | — | — | — | — | — |
| 1986 | S | 14 | Joe Tracy | United States | RW | — | — | — | — | — | — | — | — | — | — |
| 1987 | 1 | 18 | Jody Hull# | Canada | RW | 831 | 124 | 137 | 261 | 156 | — | — | — | — | — |
| 1987 | 2 | 39 | Adam Burt# | United States | D | 737 | 37 | 115 | 152 | 961 | — | — | — | — | — |
| 1987 | 4 | 81 | Terry Yake# | Canada | C | 403 | 77 | 120 | 197 | 220 | — | — | — | — | — |
| 1987 | 5 | 102 | Mark Rousseau | Canada | D | — | — | — | — | — | — | — | — | — | — |
| 1987 | 6 | 123 | Jeff St. Cyr | Canada | D | — | — | — | — | — | — | — | — | — | — |
| 1987 | 7 | 144 | Gregg Wolf | United States | D | — | — | — | — | — | — | — | — | — | — |
| 1987 | 8 | 165 | John Moore | United States | C | — | — | — | — | — | — | — | — | — | — |
| 1987 | 9 | 186 | Joe Day# | United States | C | 72 | 1 | 10 | 11 | 87 | — | — | — | — | — |
| 1987 | 11 | 228 | Kevin Sullivan | United States | RW | — | — | — | — | — | — | — | — | — | — |
| 1987 | 12 | 249 | Steve Laurin | Canada | G | — | — | — | — | — | — | — | — | — | — |
| 1987 | S | 19 | Ken Lovsin | Canada | D | 1 | 0 | 0 | 0 | 0 | — | — | — | — | — |
| 1988 | 1 | 11 | Chris Govedaris# | Canada | LW | 45 | 4 | 6 | 10 | 24 | — | — | — | — | — |
| 1988 | 2 | 32 | Barry Richter | United States | D | 151 | 11 | 34 | 45 | 76 | — | — | — | — | — |
| 1988 | 4 | 74 | Dean Dyer | Canada | C | — | — | — | — | — | — | — | — | — | — |
| 1988 | 5 | 95 | Scott Morrow | United States | LW | 4 | 0 | 0 | 0 | 0 | — | — | — | — | — |
| 1988 | 6 | 116 | Corey Beaulieu | Canada | D | — | — | — | — | — | — | — | — | — | — |
| 1988 | 7 | 137 | Kerry Russell | Canada | C | — | — | — | — | — | — | — | — | — | — |
| 1988 | 8 | 158 | Jim Burke | United States | D | — | — | — | — | — | — | — | — | — | — |
| 1988 | 9 | 179 | Mark Hirth | United States | C | — | — | — | — | — | — | — | — | — | — |
| 1988 | 10 | 200 | Wayde Bucsis | Canada | LW | — | — | — | — | — | — | — | — | — | — |
| 1988 | 11 | 221 | Rob White | Canada | D | — | — | — | — | — | — | — | — | — | — |
| 1988 | 12 | 242 | Dan Slatalla | United States | C | — | — | — | — | — | — | — | — | — | — |
| 1988 | S | 16 | Todd Krygier# | United States | D | 543 | 100 | 143 | 243 | 533 | — | — | — | — | — |
| 1989 | 1 | 10 | Bobby Holik# | Czech Republic | C | 1314 | 326 | 421 | 747 | 1421 | — | — | — | — | — |
| 1989 | 3 | 52 | Blair Atcheynum | Canada | RW | 196 | 27 | 33 | 60 | 36 | — | — | — | — | — |
| 1989 | 4 | 73 | Jim McKenzie# | Canada | LW | 880 | 48 | 52 | 100 | 1739 | — | — | — | — | — |
| 1989 | 5 | 94 | James Black# | Canada | D | 352 | 58 | 57 | 115 | 84 | — | — | — | — | — |
| 1989 | 6 | 115 | Jerome Bechard | Canada | LW | — | — | — | — | — | — | — | — | — | — |
| 1989 | 7 | 136 | Scott Daniels# | Canada | LW | 149 | 8 | 12 | 20 | 667 | — | — | — | — | — |
| 1989 | 8 | 157 | Raymond Saumier | Canada | RW | — | — | — | — | — | — | — | — | — | — |
| 1989 | 9 | 178 | Michel Picard# | Canada | LW | 166 | 28 | 42 | 70 | 103 | — | — | — | — | — |
| 1989 | 10 | 199 | Trevor Buchanan | Canada | RW | — | — | — | — | — | — | — | — | — | — |
| 1989 | 11 | 220 | John Battice | Canada | D | — | — | — | — | — | — | — | — | — | — |
| 1989 | 12 | 241 | Peter Kasowski | Canada | C | — | — | — | — | — | — | — | — | — | — |
| 1989 | S | 15 | Chris Tancill# | United States | RW | 134 | 17 | 32 | 49 | 54 | — | — | — | — | — |
| 1990 | 1 | 15 | Mark Greig# | Canada | RW | 125 | 13 | 27 | 40 | 90 | — | — | — | — | — |
| 1990 | 2 | 36 | Geoff Sanderson# | Canada | LW | 1104 | 355 | 345 | 700 | 511 | — | — | — | — | — |
| 1990 | 3 | 57 | Mike Lenarduzzi↑ | Canada | G | 4 | 0 | 0 | 0 | 0 | 1 | 1 | 1 | — | 3.17 |
| 1990 | 4 | 78 | Chris Bright | Canada | RW | — | — | — | — | — | — | — | — | — | — |
| 1990 | 6 | 120 | Cory Keenan | Canada | D | — | — | — | — | — | — | — | — | — | — |
| 1990 | 7 | 141 | Jergus Baca↑ | Slovakia | D | 10 | 0 | 2 | 2 | 14 | — | — | — | — | — |
| 1990 | 8 | 162 | Martin D'Orsonnens | Canada | D | — | — | — | — | — | — | — | — | — | — |
| 1990 | 9 | 183 | Corey Osmak | Canada | RW | — | — | — | — | — | — | — | — | — | — |
| 1990 | 10 | 204 | Espen Knutsen | Norway | C | 207 | 30 | 81 | 111 | 105 | — | — | — | — | — |
| 1990 | 11 | 225 | Tommie Eriksen | Denmark | D | — | — | — | — | — | — | — | — | — | — |
| 1990 | 12 | 246 | Denis Chalifoux | Canada | C | — | — | — | — | — | — | — | — | — | — |
| 1990 | S | 20 | Jim Crozier | United States | G | — | — | — | — | — | — | — | — | — | — |
| 1991 | 1 | 9 | Patrick Poulin# | Canada | LW | 634 | 101 | 134 | 235 | 299 | — | — | — | — | — |
| 1991 | 2 | 31 | Martin Hamrlik | Czech Republic | D | — | — | — | — | — | — | — | — | — | — |
| 1991 | 3 | 53 | Todd Hall | United States | LW | — | — | — | — | — | — | — | — | — | — |
| 1991 | 3 | 59 | Michael Nylander# | Sweden | C | 920 | 209 | 470 | 679 | 468 | — | — | — | — | — |
| 1991 | 4 | 75 | Jim Storm# | United States | LW | 84 | 7 | 15 | 22 | 44 | — | — | — | — | — |
| 1991 | 6 | 119 | Mike Harding | Canada | RW | — | — | — | — | — | — | — | — | — | — |
| 1991 | 7 | 141 | Brian Mueller | United States | D | — | — | — | — | — | — | — | — | — | — |
| 1991 | 8 | 163 | Steven Yule | Canada | D | — | — | — | — | — | — | — | — | — | — |
| 1991 | 9 | 185 | Chris Belanger | Canada | D | — | — | — | — | — | — | — | — | — | — |
| 1991 | 10 | 207 | Jason Currie | Canada | G | — | — | — | — | — | — | — | — | — | — |
| 1991 | 9 | 195 | Vitalij Orlov | CCCP | C | — | — | — | — | — | — | — | — | — | — |
| 1991 | 12 | 251 | Rob Peters | United States | D | — | — | — | — | — | — | — | — | — | -1|—} |
| 1991 | S | 15 | Shaun Gravistin | Canada | G | — | — | — | — | — | — | — | — | — | — |
| 1992 | 1 | 9 | Robert Petrovicky# | Slovakia | C | 208 | 27 | 38 | 65 | 118 | — | — | — | — | — |
| 1992 | 2 | 47 | Andrei Nikolishin# | Russia | C | 628 | 93 | 187 | 280 | 270 | — | — | — | — | — |
| 1992 | 3 | 57 | Jan Vopat | Czech Republic | D | 126 | 11 | 20 | 31 | 70 | — | — | — | — | — |
| 1992 | 4 | 79 | Kevin Smyth↑ | Canada | LW | 58 | 6 | 8 | 14 | 31 | — | — | — | — | — |
| 1992 | 4 | 81 | Jason McBain↑ | United States | D | 9 | 0 | 0 | 0 | 0 | — | — | — | — | — |
| 1992 | 6 | 143 | Jarrett Reid | Canada | C | — | — | — | — | — | — | — | — | — | — |
| 1992 | 7 | 153 | Ken Belanger | Canada | LW | 248 | 11 | 12 | 23 | 695 | — | — | — | — | — |
| 1992 | 8 | 177 | Konstantin Korotkov | Russia | C | — | — | — | — | — | — | — | — | — | — |
| 1992 | 9 | 201 | Greg Zwakman | United States | D | — | — | — | — | — | — | — | — | — | — |
| 1992 | 10 | 225 | Steven Halko | Canada | D | 155 | 0 | 15 | 15 | 71 | — | — | — | — | — |
| 1992 | 11 | 249 | Joacim Esbjors | Sweden | D | — | — | — | — | — | — | — | — | — | — |
| 1993 | 1 | 2 | Chris Pronger#† | Canada | D | 1167 | 157 | 541 | 698 | 1590 | — | — | — | — | — |
| 1993 | 3 | 72 | Marek Malik# | Czech Republic | D | 691 | 33 | 135 | 168 | 620 | — | — | — | — | — |
| 1993 | 4 | 84 | Trevor Roenick | United States | RW | — | — | — | — | — | — | — | — | — | — |
| 1993 | 5 | 115 | Nolan Pratt# | Canada | D | 592 | 9 | 56 | 65 | 537 | — | — | — | — | — |
| 1993 | 8 | 188 | Manny Legace | Canada | G | 365 | 0 | 9 | 9 | 12 | 187 | 99 | 18 | 23 | 2.41 |
| 1993 | 9 | 214 | Dmitri Gorenko | Russia | F | — | — | — | — | — | — | — | — | — | — |
| 1993 | 10 | 240 | Wes Swinson | Canada | D | — | — | — | — | — | — | — | — | — | — |
| 1993 | 11 | 266 | Igor Chibirev↑ | Ukraine | C | 45 | 7 | 12 | 19 | 2 | — | — | — | — | — |
| 1993 | S | 6 | Kent Fearns | Canada | D | — | — | — | — | — | — | — | — | — | — |
| 1994 | 1 | 5 | Jeff O'Neill# | Canada | C | 821 | 237 | 259 | 496 | 670 | — | — | — | — | — |
| 1994 | 4 | 83 | Hnat Domenichelli# | Canada | C | 267 | 52 | 61 | 113 | 104 | — | — | — | — | — |
| 1994 | 5 | 109 | Ryan Risidore | Canada | D | — | — | — | — | — | — | — | — | — | — |
| 1994 | 8 | 197 | Juraj Jenčo | Slovakia | C | — | — | — | — | — | — | — | — | — | — |
| 1994 | 9 | 213 | Ashlin Halfnight | Canada | D | — | — | — | — | — | — | — | — | — | — |
| 1994 | 9 | 230 | Matt Ball | Canada | RW | — | — | — | — | — | — | — | — | — | — |
| 1994 | 10 | 239 | Brian Regan | United States | G | — | — | — | — | — | — | — | — | — | — |
| 1994 | 11 | 265 | Steve Nimigon | Canada | LW | — | — | — | — | — | — | — | — | — | — |
| 1994 | S | 5 | Steve Martins# | Canada | C | 267 | 21 | 25 | 46 | 142 | — | — | — | — | — |
| 1995 | 1 | 13 | Jean-Sebastien Giguere# | Canada | G | 597 | 0 | 7 | 7 | 98 | 262 | 216 | 25 | 50 | 2.53 |
| 1995 | 2 | 35 | Sergei Fedotov | Russia | D | — | — | — | — | — | — | — | — | — | — |
| 1995 | 4 | 185 | Ian MacNeil | Canada | C | 2 | 0 | 0 | 0 | 0 | — | — | — | — | — |
| 1995 | 4 | 87 | Sami Kapanen# | Finland | RW | 831 | 189 | 269 | 458 | 175 | — | — | — | — | — |
| 1995 | 5 | 113 | Hugh Hamilton | Canada | D | — | — | — | — | — | — | — | — | — | — |
| 1995 | 7 | 165 | Byron Ritchie | Canada | C | 324 | 25 | 33 | 58 | 373 | — | — | — | — | — |
| 1995 | 8 | 191 | Milan Kostolny | Slovakia | LW | — | — | — | — | — | — | — | — | — | — |
| 1995 | 9 | 217 | Mike Rucinski | United States | D | 26 | 0 | 2 | 2 | 10 | — | — | — | — | — |
| 1996 | 2 | 34 | Trevor Wasyluk | Canada | LW | — | — | — | — | — | — | — | — | — | — |
| 1996 | 3 | 61 | Andrei Petrunin | Russia | RW | — | — | — | — | — | — | — | — | — | — |
| 1996 | 4 | 88 | Craig MacDonald | Canada | C | 233 | 11 | 24 | 35 | 91 | — | — | — | — | — |
| 1996 | 4 | 104 | Steve Wasylko | Canada | C | — | — | — | — | — | — | — | — | — | — |
| 1996 | 5 | 116 | Mark McMahon | Canada | D | — | — | — | — | — | — | — | — | — | — |
| 1996 | 6 | 143 | Aaron Baker | Canada | G | — | — | — | — | — | — | — | — | — | — |
| 1996 | 7 | 171 | Greg Kuznik | Canada | D | 1 | 0 | 0 | 0 | 0 | — | — | — | — | — |
| 1996 | 8 | 197 | Kevin Marsh | Canada | W | — | — | — | — | — | — | — | — | — | — |
| 1996 | 9 | 223 | Craig Adams | Canada | RW | 951 | 55 | 105 | 160 | 683 | — | — | — | — | — |
| 1996 | 9 | 231 | Askhat Rakhmatullin | Russia | F | — | — | — | — | — | — | — | — | — | — |

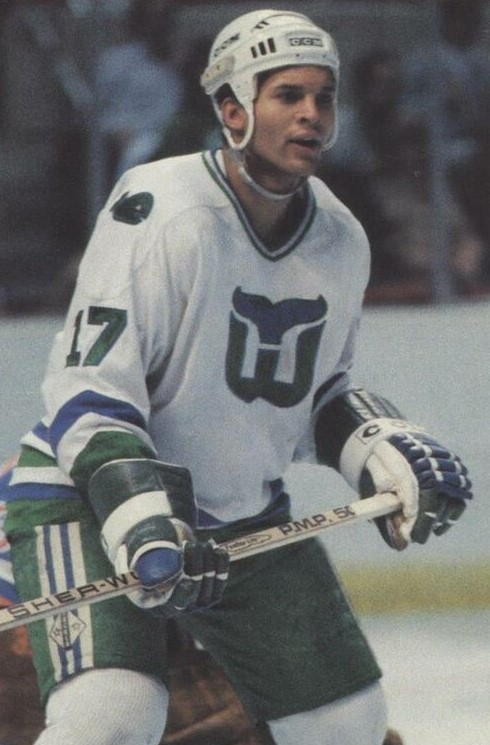
The Whalers selected Ray Neufeld 81st overall in the 1979 NHL entry draft.

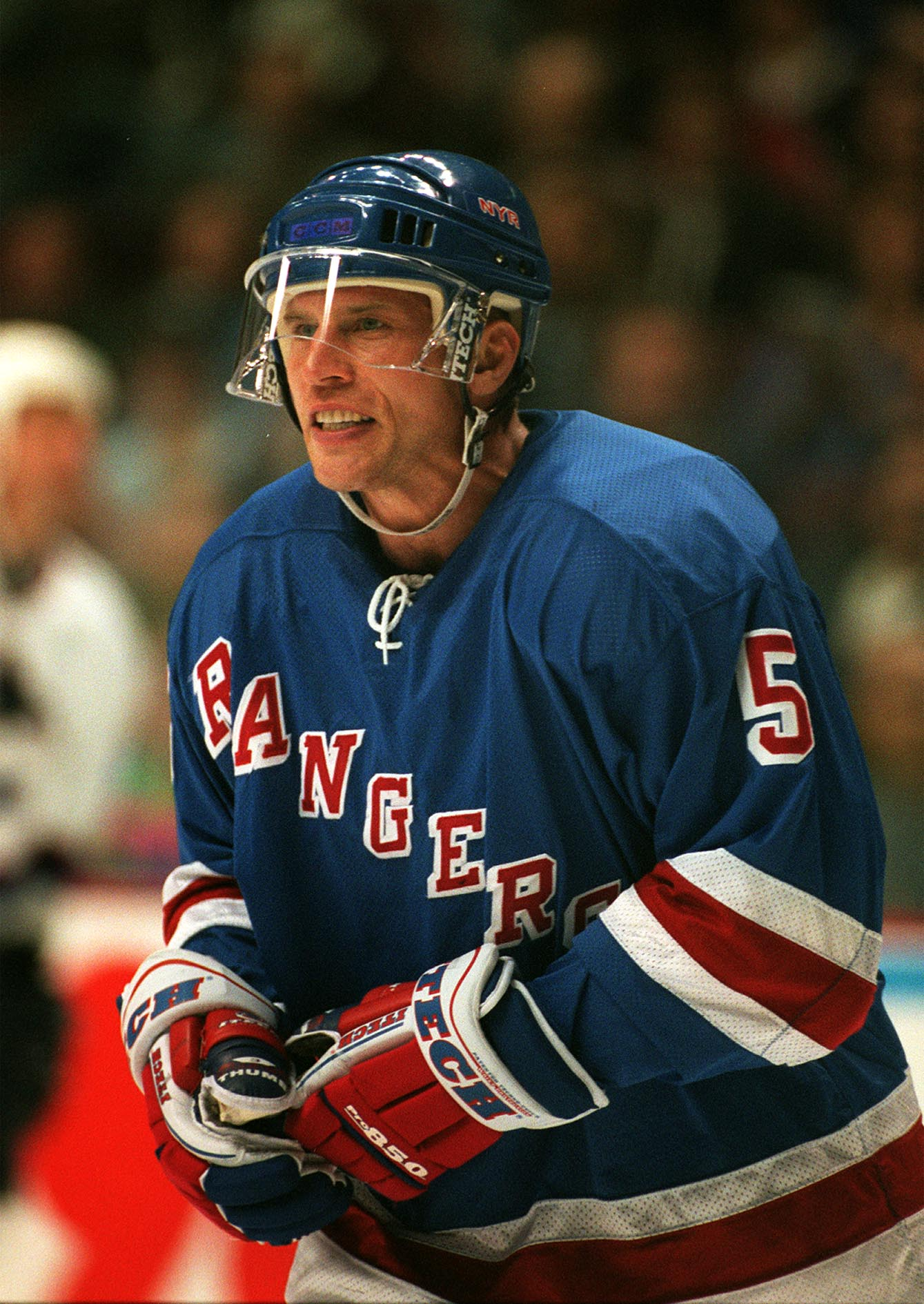
The Whalers selected Ulf Samuelsson 67th overall in the 1982 NHL entry draft.

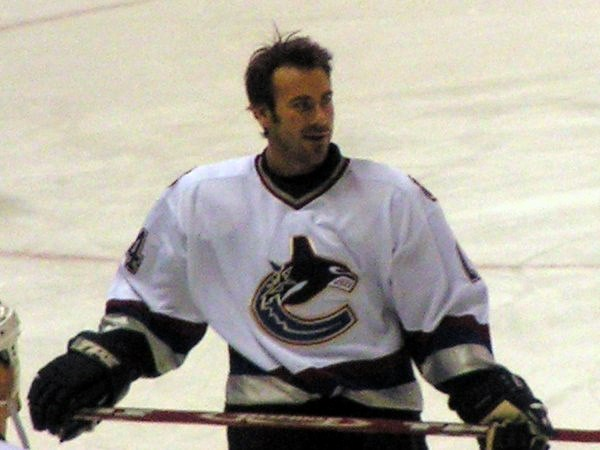
The Whalers selected Geoff Sanderson 36th overall in the 1990 NHL entry draft.

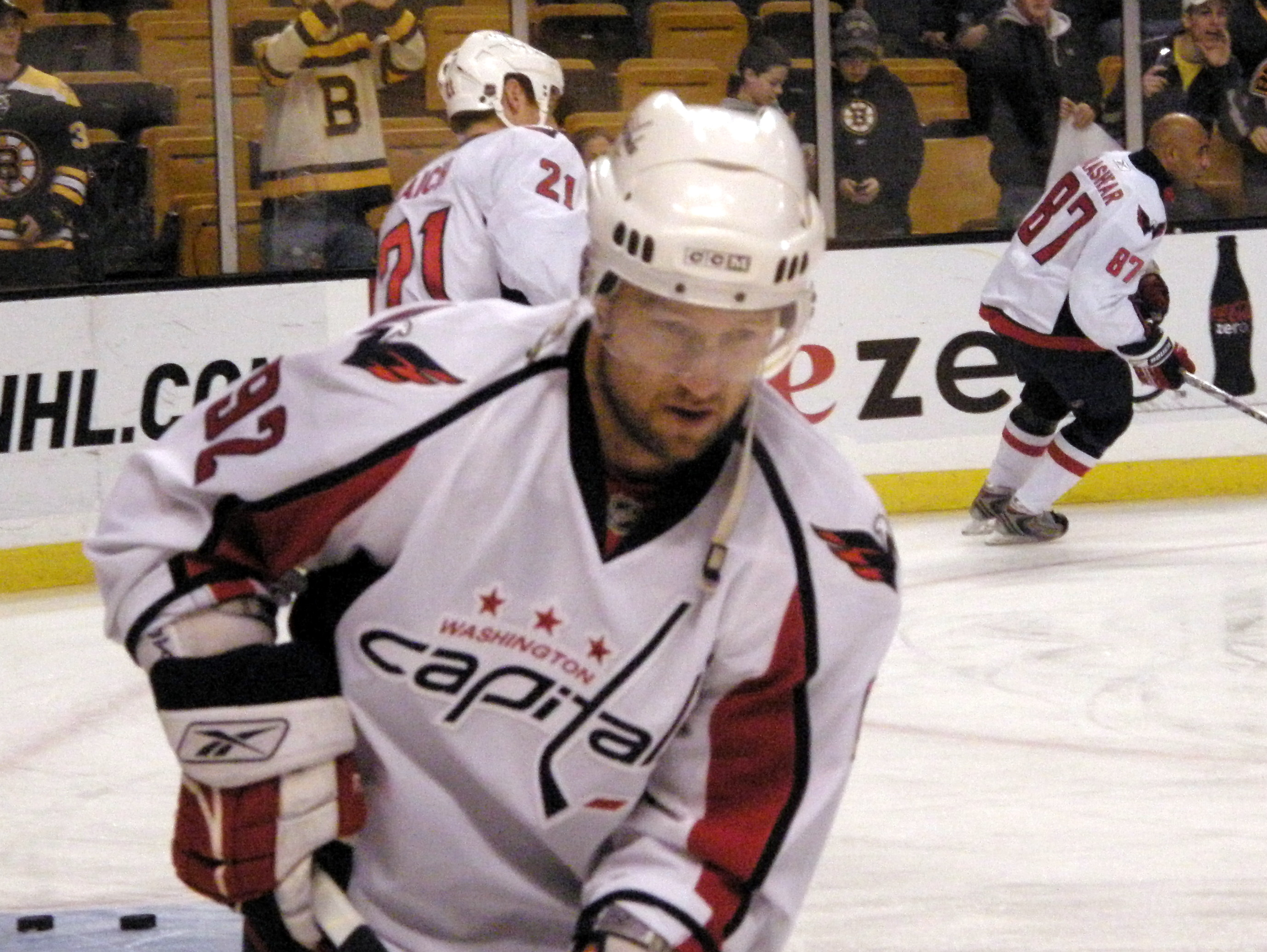
The Whalers selected Michael Nylander 59th overall in the 1991 NHL entry draft.

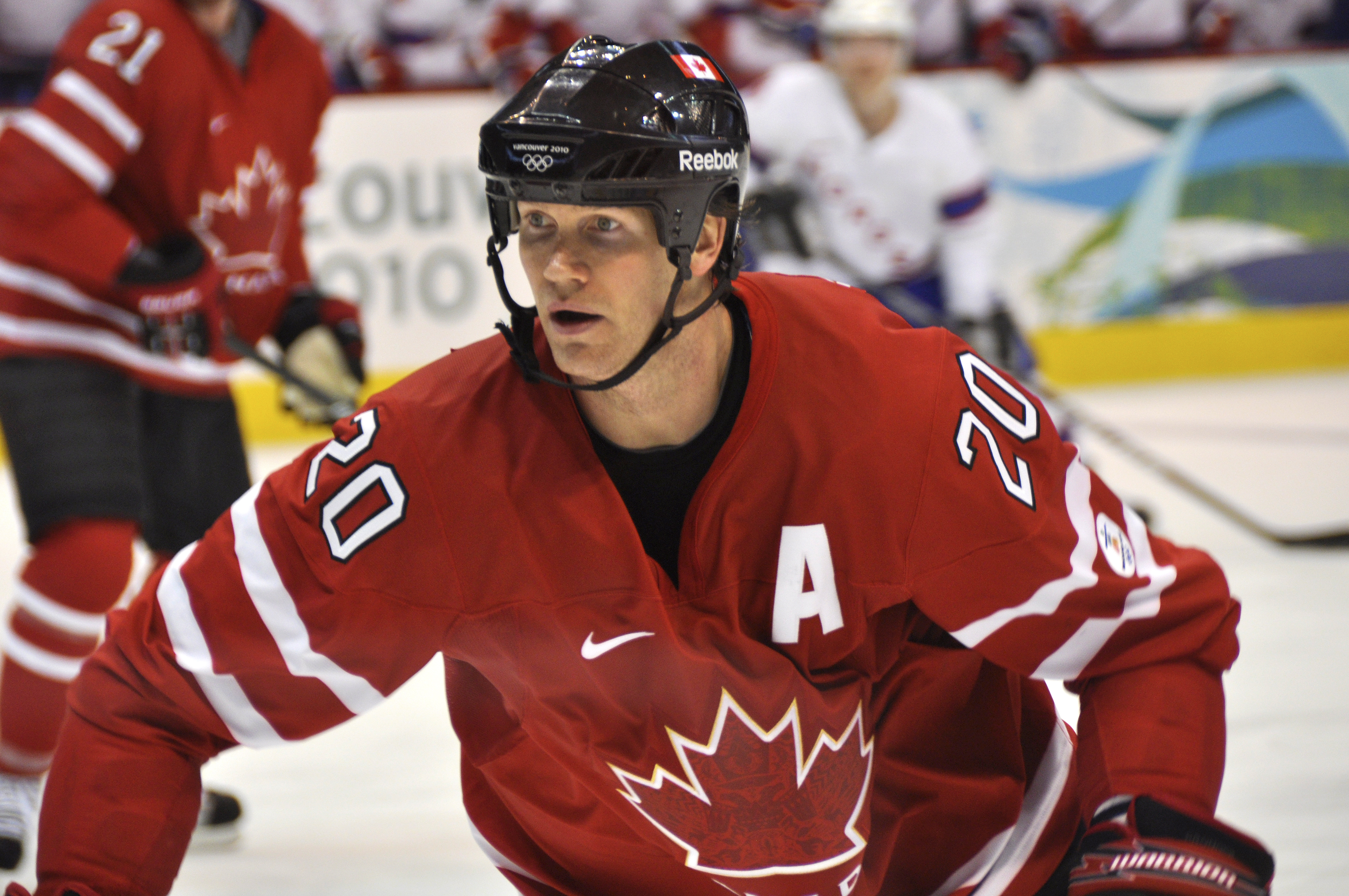
The Whalers selected Chris Pronger 2nd overall in the 1993 NHL entry draft.

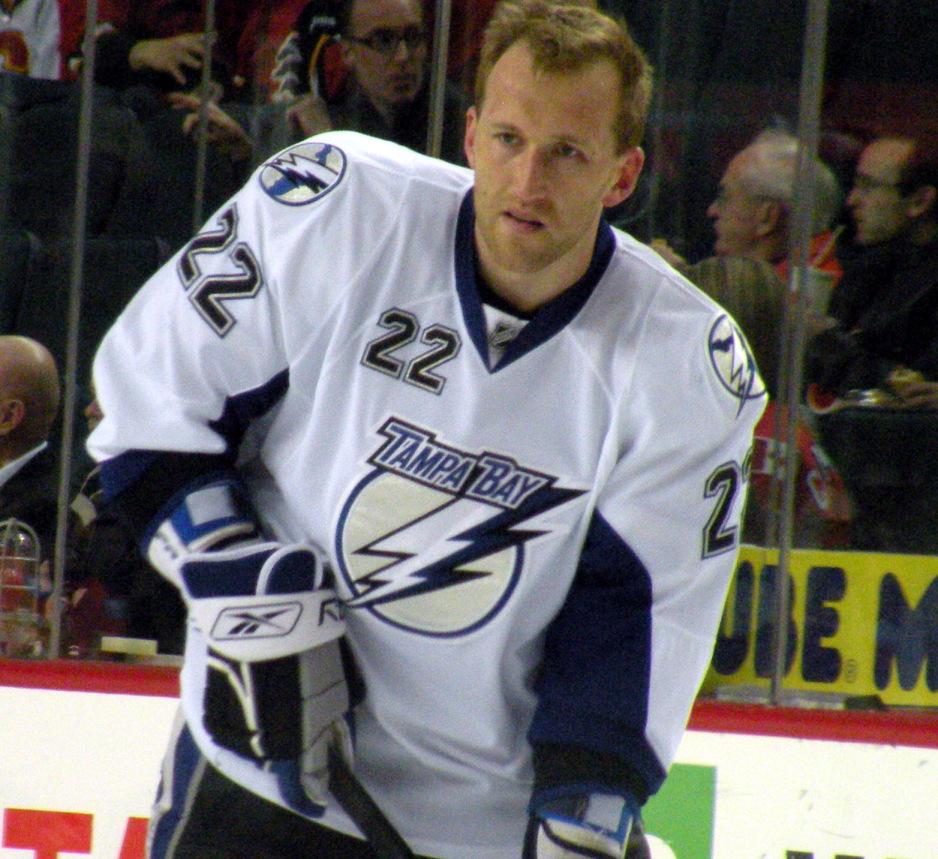
The Whalers selected Marek Malik 72nd overall in the 1993 NHL Entry Draft.

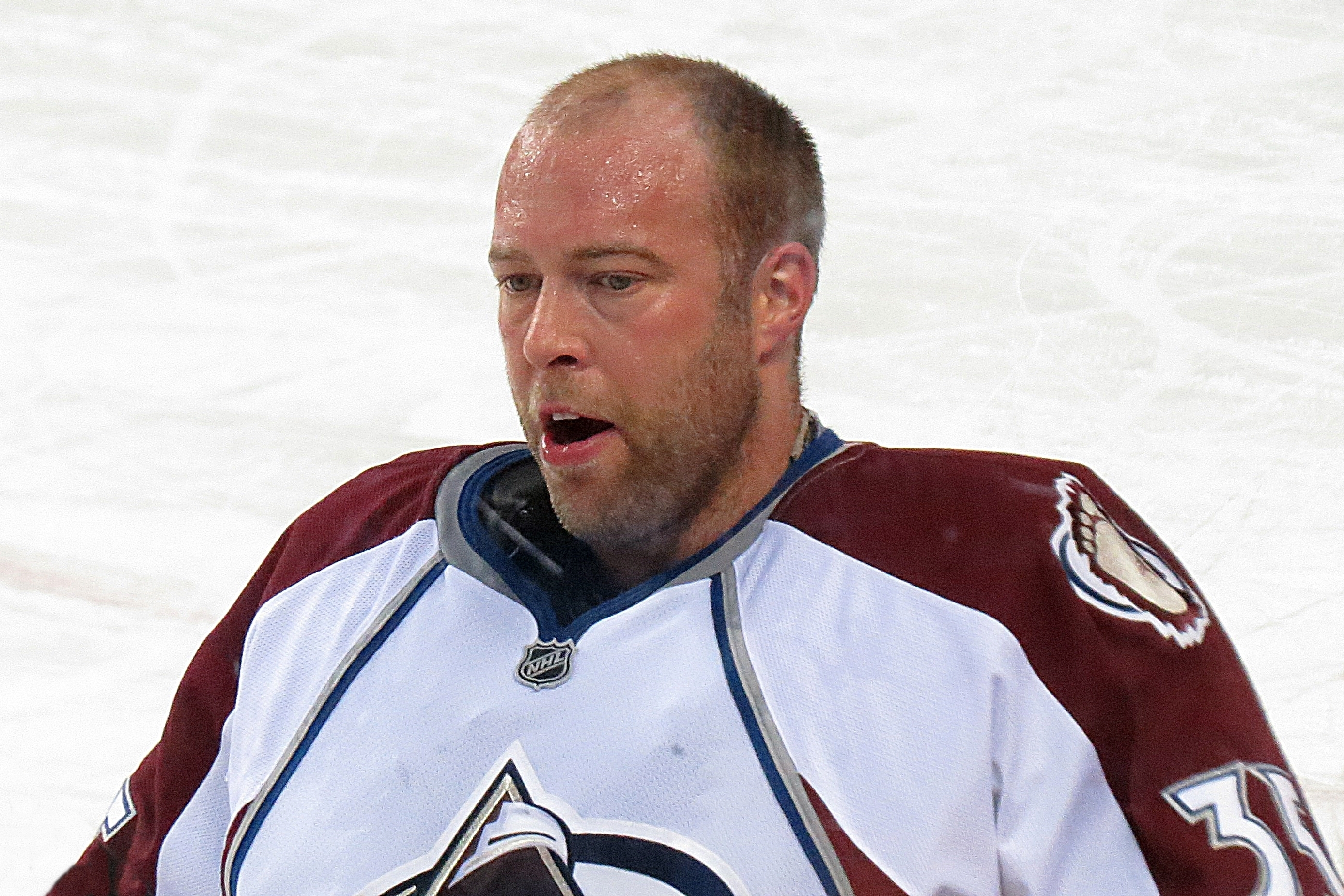
The Whalers selected Jean-Sebastien Giguere 13th overall in the 1995 NHL entry draft.

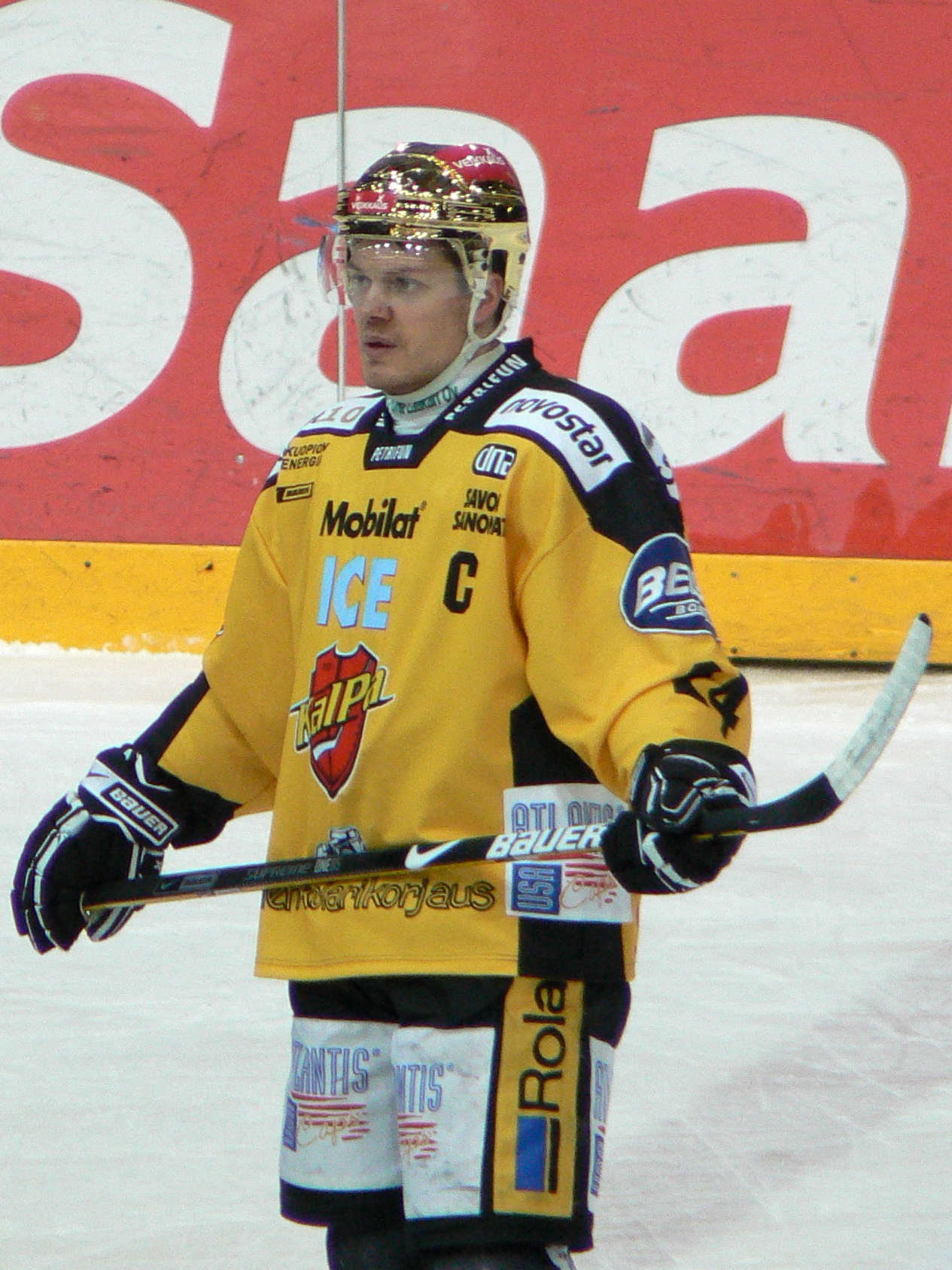
The Whalers selected Sami Kapanen 87th overall in the 1995 NHL Entry Draft.

== See also ==
- List of Hartford Whalers players
- 1979 NHL Expansion Draft
- List of Carolina Hurricanes draft picks
