= Juha Nurmi =

- Born: February 25, 1959 (age 66); Tampere, Finland
- Position: Center
- Played for: Tappara; TPS; Luleå Hockey
- NHL draft: 194, 1982; Washington Capitals
- Playing career: 1980–1990

Juha Nurmi (born 25 February 1959) is a retired Finnish ice hockey center who last played for Luleå Hockey in Elitserien (now SHL) in 1990. Nurmi played for Tappara when they won the Finnish championships in 1982.

== Career ==
Nurmi has played 196 games in Liiga with 158 points and 141 games in Elitserien with 121 points.
