= Tommy Lehmann =

Swedish ice hockey player

- Born: February 3, 1964 (age 62) Stockholm, Sweden
- Height: 6 ft 1 in (185 cm)
- Weight: 185 lb (84 kg; 13 st 3 lb)
- Position: Centre
- Shot: Left
- Played for: AIK; Boston Bruins; Edmonton Oilers; MODO; Södertälje
- NHL draft: 228th overall, 1982; Boston Bruins
- Playing career: 1985–1997

Tommy Preben Lehmann (sometimes shown as Lehman, born February 3, 1964) is a Swedish retired professional ice hockey centre.

Lehmann played for AIK in the Swedish Elitserien for five seasons from 1982 to 1987. Selected by the Boston Bruins of the National Hockey League in the 1982 NHL entry draft, he joined Boston for the 1987–88 season, and played nine games that season, and a further 26 games the following season, spending most of those two years playing for the Bruins' American Hockey League affiliate Maine Mariners. He was traded to the Edmonton Oilers before the 1989–90 season, but played in only one game for the club. Lehmann played in 19 regular season games and 6 playoff games for the Cape Breton Oilers before returning to Sweden. Lehmann played for seven more years in the Elitserien, mostly for AIK, but also for MODO for one season, and one game for Södertälje in his final season, before retiring in 1997.

Internationally Lehmann played for the Swedish national junior team at the 1983 and 1984 World Junior Championships.

== Family ==
His son, Niclas Lehmann (born January 5, 1990), also plays hockey.

== Career statistics ==
=== Regular season and playoffs ===
			Regular season					Playoffs
Season	Team	League	GP	G	A	Pts	PIM	GP	G	A	Pts	PIM
1980–81	Stocksunds IF	SWE-3	12	0	6	6	—	—	—	—	—	—
1981–82	Stocksunds IF	SWE-3	22	13	20	33	—	—	—	—	—	—
1982–83	AIK	SWE	28	1	5	6	2	3	0	0	0	0
1983–84	AIK	SWE	22	4	5	9	6	6	2	2	4	0
1984–85	AIK	SWE	34	13	13	26	6	—	—	—	—	—
1985–86	AIK	SWE	35	11	13	24	12	—	—	—	—	—
1986–87	AIK	SWE-2	31	25	15	40	12	—	—	—	—	—
1987–88	Boston Bruins	NHL	9	1	3	4	6	—	—	—	—	—
1987–88	Maine Mariners	AHL	11	3	5	8	2	—	—	—	—	—
1988–89	Boston Bruins	NHL	26	4	2	6	10	—	—	—	—	—
1988–89	Maine Mariners	AHL	26	1	13	14	12	—	—	—	—	—
1989–90	AIK	SWE	22	7	9	16	12	3	1	1	2	0
1989–90	Edmonton Oilers	NHL	1	0	0	0	0	—	—	—	—	—
1989–90	Cape Breton Oilers	AHL	19	6	11	17	7	6	2	2	4	2
1990–91	AIK	SWE	36	11	14	25	40	—	—	—	—	—
1991–92	AIK	SWE	38	4	11	15	12	3	0	0	0	2
1992–93	MODO	SWE	40	7	7	14	22	3	1	0	1	4
1993–94	AIK	SWE-2	37	13	24	37	30	—	—	—	—	—
1994–95	AIK	SWE	35	4	11	15	16	—	—	—	—	—
1995–96	AIK	SWE	3	0	0	0	2	—	—	—	—	—
1996–97	Södertälje	SWE	1	0	0	0	2	—	—	—	—	—
SWE totals			294	62	88	150	132	18	4	3	7	6
NHL totals			36	5	5	10	16	—	—	—	—	—

=== International ===
Year	Team	Event	GP	G	A	Pts	PIM
1982	Sweden	EJC	5	1	3	4	0
1983	Sweden	WJC	7	2	3	5	2
1984	Sweden	WJC	7	7	1	8	2
Junior totals			19	10	7	17	4
