= Rick MacLeish =

Canadian ice hockey player (1950–2016)

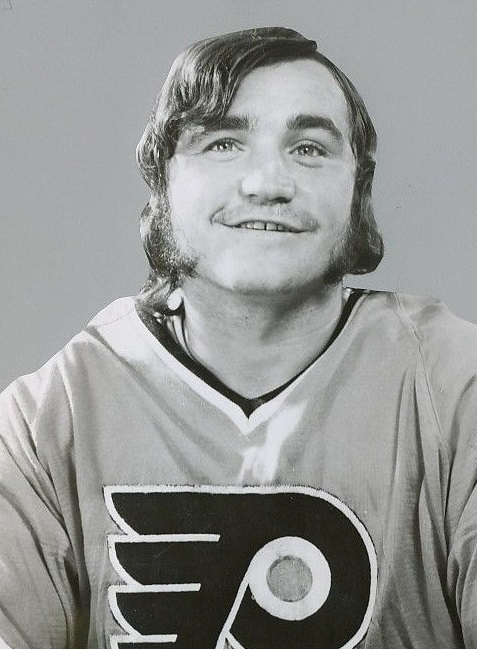
- MacLeish with the Philadelphia Flyers in 1973
- Born: January 3, 1950 Lindsay, Ontario, Canada
- Died: May 30, 2016 (aged 66) Philadelphia, Pennsylvania, U.S.
- Height: 5 ft 11 in (180 cm)
- Weight: 187 lb (85 kg; 13 st 5 lb)
- Position: Centre
- Shot: Left
- Played for: Philadelphia Flyers; Hartford Whalers; Pittsburgh Penguins; Detroit Red Wings
- NHL draft: 4th overall, 1970; Boston Bruins
- Playing career: 1970–1984

Richard George MacLeish (January 3, 1950 – May 30, 2016) was a Canadian professional ice hockey forward who played 14 seasons in the National Hockey League (NHL) with the Philadelphia Flyers, Hartford Whalers, Pittsburgh Penguins, and Detroit Red Wings. He played 12 seasons in Philadelphia, winning the Stanley Cup twice with the Flyers in 1974 and 1975. His 53 goals in the Stanley Cup playoffs for the Flyers is a franchise record that he shares with Bill Barber.

== Playing career ==
MacLeish played minor ice hockey in Cannington, Ontario, and went to the 1962 Quebec International Pee-Wee Hockey Tournament with his youth team. He played junior ice hockey with the Peterborough Petes from 1967 to 1970. The Boston Bruins selected him fourth overall in the 1970 NHL Amateur Draft. After spending the first half of his first professional season with the Oklahoma City Blazers, MacLeish was involved in a three-way deal which sent him; Bruce Gamble, Dan Schock, and a 1st round pick to the Philadelphia Flyers, Bernie Parent and a 2nd round pick to the Toronto Maple Leafs, and Mike Walton to Boston. MacLeish spent the rest of the 1970–71 season with the Flyers, scoring two goals and four assists in 26 games. He also added a goal in four playoff games. In the 1971–72 season he saw his output drop considerably to a single goal, and consequently split the year between the Flyers and their AHL affiliate the Richmond Robins.

The 1972–73 season, during which the Flyers earned the nickname "the Broad Street Bullies" proved to be a breakout year for MacLeish as he became the first member of the Flyers to ever score 50 goals in a single campaign. He added 50 assists that year, to bring his points total to 100. This was enough to finish fourth in league scoring, only a single point behind Bobby Orr. In the Stanley Cup playoffs, the Flyers won their first playoff series against the Minnesota North Stars and faced the heavily favored Montreal Canadiens in the semi-final round. MacLeish and the Flyers stunned the Canadiens winning the opening game in Montreal when the Flyers' center intercepted an errant Frank Mahovlich pass (Mahovlich lost the puck in a legendary "puddle of water" on the ice) and scored in overtime. The Flyers pushed the Canadiens into overtime in game two as well, but, would lose that game 4–3 and would go on to lose the series four games to one.

In the 1973–74 season, MacLeish's regular season scoring dropped slightly, as he scored 32 goals and added 45 assists. In the playoffs, however, he led all scorers with 13 goals and 9 assists as the Flyers claimed their first ever Stanley Cup. He scored the only goal in the series' sixth and final game, and narrowly missed out on winning the Conn Smythe Trophy to his teammate, Bernie Parent.

After another successful regular season in 1974–75, notching 38 goals and 41 assists MacLeish went on to lead his team again in playoff scoring as they won a second consecutive championship. This championship marked the last time the trophy was raised by a team consisting solely of Canadian-born players. MacLeish's 1975–76 season was marred by injury, as he only played in 51 games. He managed to accumulate 22 goals and 23 assists in the regular season, but was unable to play in the playoffs, which saw the Flyers swept in four games by the Montreal Canadiens.

The following year saw MacLeish lead the Flyers in scoring for the first time in his career, tallying 49 goals and 48 assists. It also was the first year in which he earned an invitation to the NHL All-Star Game, a feat which he duplicated the following year. In a game against the Los Angeles Kings in April 1978, MacLeish narrowly avoided serious injury suffering a cut neck requiring 80 stitches when he slid into the skate of center Marcel Dionne. Several days later, he was back in the lineup. He joked later that he smoked a cigarette in the locker room afterward and smoke came out his throat.

After the 1980–81 season, the Flyers traded MacLeish, Blake Wesley, and Don Gillen to the Hartford Whalers for Fred Arthur and Ray Allison. During the 1981–82 season, the Whalers traded MacLeish to the Pittsburgh Penguins for Russ Anderson. Pittsburgh released MacLeish during the 1982–83 season, and he played briefly in Switzerland. He rejoined the Flyers as a free agent for the 1983–84 season, and was traded during the season to the Detroit Red Wings for future considerations. He retired at the end of that season.

== Playing style ==
His skating and playing styles were influenced by years of "river skating" where he developed his smooth, long striding speed. MacLeish depended on a whipping and accurate wrist shot for the majority of his goals and was the Flyers' first, pure goal-scoring "sniper". In 2016, sportswriter Bill Fleischman recalled, "Forty-two years later, I can still see him gliding across the opponent's blue line with the puck, often swerving left, leaning as if he might tumble to the ice and flicking a wrist shot past the goalie. It seemed as if MacLeish was on cruise control."

== Later life ==
In retirement, MacLeish enjoyed his passion for owning racehorses. In the early 2000s, he suffered a heart attack during a Flyers Alumni game and had cardiac bypass surgery the next day. MacLeish also suffered from diabetes. On May 11, 2016, MacLeish's daughter announced her father had been "battling multiple medical problems" for the last 6 weeks in a Philadelphia hospital. MacLeish died in the Philadelphia hospital where he was being treated on May 30, 2016, at age 66 of meningitis, as well as kidney and liver failure. MacLeish was survived by his wife, Charlene, and two daughters, Brianna and Danielle.

== Tribute ==
Upon learning of MacLeish's death, Philadelphia Flyers' team president Paul Holmgren issued the following statement on the club's Instagram account: "With the passing of Rick MacLeish, the Flyers have lost one of their legends. A good father, grandfather, teammate and friend, Rick will be missed by all who were fortunate to come and know him over the years. His happy and friendly demeanor was front and center everywhere Rick went."

== Career statistics ==
			Regular Season					Playoffs
Season	Team	League	GP	G	A	Pts	PIM	GP	G	A	Pts	PIM
1966–67	London Nationals	OHA-Jr.	2	0	0	0	0	—	—	—	—	—
1966–67	Peterborough Petes	OHA-Jr.	8	0	0	0	0	—	—	—	—	—
1967–68	Peterborough Petes	OHA-Jr.	54	24	25	49	16	5	2	1	3	0
1968–69	Peterborough Petes	OHA-Jr.	54	50	42	92	29	10	7	14	21	8
1969–70	Peterborough Petes	OHA-Jr.	54	45	56	101	135	6	4	4	8	10
1970–71	Oklahoma City Blazers	CHL	46	13	15	28	93	—	—	—	—	—
1970–71	Philadelphia Flyers	NHL	26	2	4	6	19	4	1	0	1	0
1971–72	Richmond Robins	AHL	42	24	11	35	33	—	—	—	—	—
1971–72	Philadelphia Flyers	NHL	17	1	2	3	9	—	—	—	—	—
1972–73	Philadelphia Flyers	NHL	78	50	50	100	69	10	3	4	7	2
1973–74	Philadelphia Flyers	NHL	78	32	45	77	42	17	13	9	22	20
1974–75	Philadelphia Flyers	NHL	80	38	41	79	50	17	11	9	20	8
1975–76	Philadelphia Flyers	NHL	51	22	23	45	16	—	—	—	—	—
1976–77	Philadelphia Flyers	NHL	79	49	48	97	42	10	4	9	13	2
1977–78	Philadelphia Flyers	NHL	76	31	39	70	33	12	7	9	16	4
1978–79	Philadelphia Flyers	NHL	71	26	32	58	47	7	0	1	1	0
1979–80	Philadelphia Flyers	NHL	78	31	35	66	28	19	9	6	15	2
1980–81	Philadelphia Flyers	NHL	78	38	36	74	25	12	5	5	10	0
1981–82	Hartford Whalers	NHL	34	6	16	22	16	—	—	—	—	—
1981–82	Pittsburgh Penguins	NHL	40	13	12	25	28	5	1	1	2	0
1982–83	Pittsburgh Penguins	NHL	6	0	5	5	2	—	—	—	—	—
1982–83	EHC Kloten	NDA	1	0	0	0	0	—	—	—	—	—
1983–84	Philadelphia Flyers	NHL	29	8	14	22	4	—	—	—	—	—
1983–84	Detroit Red Wings	NHL	25	2	8	10	4	1	0	0	0	0
NHL totals			846	349	410	759	434	114	54	53	107	38

Preceded by Reggie Leach	Boston Bruins first-round draft pick 1970	Succeeded by Ron Plumb
