= Dave Gans =

American ice hockey player

- Born: June 6, 1964 (age 61) Brantford, Ontario, Canada
- Height: 5 ft 11 in (180 cm)
- Weight: 185 lb (84 kg; 13 st 3 lb)
- Position: Centre
- Shot: Right
- Played for: Los Angeles Kings
- NHL draft: 64th overall, 1982; Los Angeles Kings
- Playing career: 1982–1988

David Gans (born June 6, 1964) is a Canadian former professional ice hockey player who played for the Los Angeles Kings during the 1982–83 and the 1985–86 seasons.

== Career statistics ==
			Regular season					Playoffs
Season	Team	League	GP	G	A	Pts	PIM	GP	G	A	Pts	PIM
1980–81	Brantford Penguins	GHL	36	46	45	91	146	—	—	—	—	—
1981–82	Oshawa Generals	OHL	66	22	51	73	112	12	3	6	9	45
1982–83	Oshawa Generals	OHL	64	41	64	105	90	17	14	24	38	27
1982–83	Los Angeles Kings	NHL	3	0	0	0	0	—	—	—	—	—
1983–84	Oshawa Generals	OHL	62	56	76	132	89	6	3	4	7	9
1984–85	Toledo Goaldiggers	IHL	81	52	53	105	65	6	4	3	7	26
1985–86	Los Angeles Kings	NHL	3	0	0	0	2	—	—	—	—	—
1985–86	New Haven Nighthawks	AHL	17	11	12	23	14	—	—	—	—	—
1985–86	Hershey Bears	AHL	56	24	32	56	88	18	10	5	15	60
1986–87	HC Ambrì-Piotta	NLA	5	3	0	3	8	—	—	—	—	—
1986–87	Hershey Bears	AHL	20	7	8	15	28	5	0	0	0	21
1986–87	New Haven Nighthawks	AHL	29	10	11	21	20	—	—	—	—	—
1987–88	Newmarket Saints	AHL	16	2	7	9	11	—	—	—	—	—
NHL totals			6	0	0	0	2	—	—	—	—	—
AHL totals			138	54	70	124	161	23	10	5	15	81
