= Mike Craig (ice hockey, born 1962) =

Canadian ice hockey player

- Born: November 1, 1962 (age 63) Calgary, Alberta, Canada
- Height: 6 ft 0 in (183 cm)
- Weight: 165 lb (75 kg; 11 st 11 lb)
- Position: Goaltender
- Caught: Left
- Played for: Rochester Americans; Flint Generals; Flint Spirits
- NHL draft: 205th overall, 1982; Buffalo Sabres
- Playing career: 1984–1987

Mike Craig (born November 1, 1962) is a Canadian former professional ice hockey goaltender. He was selected by the Buffalo Sabres in the 10th round (205th overall) of the 1982 NHL entry draft.

== Early life ==
Craig was born in Calgary, Alberta. As a junior, he played with the Calgary Canucks in the Alberta Junior Hockey League (AJHL), where he won the AJHL Marsh Trophy (shared with Mike Vernon) for the goaltenders of the team with the fewest goals scored against it during the regular season.

== Career ==
Craig played major junior hockey in the Western Hockey League (WHL) with the Calgary Wranglers, where he also shared netminding duties with Mike Vernon. He then played with the WHL's Billings Bighorns and the University of Calgary before turning professional in 1984 with the Rochester Americans of the American Hockey League (AHL). In his three professional seasons, Craig played 99 games with the Americans, and 10 games in the International Hockey League (IHL). He retired following the 1986–87 season.

== Awards and honours ==
Award	Year
AJHL Marsh Trophy – Top Team Goaltenders (shared with Mike Vernon)	1979–80
