= Mike Posavad =

Canadian ice hockey player

- Born: January 3, 1964 (age 62) Brantford, Ontario, Canada
- Height: 5 ft 11 in (180 cm)
- Weight: 194 lb (88 kg; 13 st 12 lb)
- Position: Defense
- Shot: Right
- Played for: St. Louis Blues
- NHL draft: 50th overall, 1982; St. Louis Blues
- Playing career: 1982–1988

Mike Posavad (born January 3, 1964) is a Canadian former professional ice hockey player who played eight games in the National Hockey League for the St. Louis Blues.

== Career statistics ==
			Regular season					Playoffs
Season	Team	League	GP	G	A	Pts	PIM	GP	G	A	Pts	PIM
1979–80	Brantford Penguins	GHL	43	11	22	33	16	—	—	—	—	—
1980–81	Peterborough Petes	OHL	58	3	12	15	55	—	—	—	—	—
1981–82	Peterborough Petes	OHL	64	7	23	30	110	9	3	4	7	15
1982–83	Peterborough Petes	OHL	70	1	36	37	68	4	0	2	2	2
1982–83	Salt Lake Golden Eagles	CHL	1	0	0	0	0	—	—	—	—	—
1983–84	Peterborough Petes	OHL	63	3	25	28	78	8	3	2	5	8
1984–85	Peoria Rivermen	IHL	67	2	19	21	58	19	1	5	6	42
1985–86	Peoria Rivermen	IHL	72	1	17	18	75	11	0	1	1	13
1985–86	St. Louis Blues	NHL	6	0	0	0	0	—	—	—	—	—
1986–87	Peoria Rivermen	IHL	77	2	15	17	77	—	—	—	—	—
1986–87	St. Louis Blues	NHL	2	0	0	0	0	—	—	—	—	—
1987–88	Peoria Rivermen	IHL	27	0	4	4	23	—	—	—	—	—
AHL totals			8	0	0	0	0	—	—	—	—	—
IHL totals			243	5	55	60	233	30	1	6	7	55
