= Fred Arthur =

Canadian ice hockey player and doctor

- Born: March 9, 1961 (age 65) Toronto, Ontario, Canada
- Height: 6 ft 5 in (196 cm)
- Weight: 210 lb (95 kg; 15 st 0 lb)
- Position: Defence
- Shot: Left
- Played for: Hartford Whalers; Philadelphia Flyers
- NHL draft: 8th overall, 1980; Hartford Whalers
- Playing career: 1980–1982

Frederick Edward Arthur (born March 9, 1961) is a Canadian former professional ice hockey defenceman and medical doctor who played three seasons in the National Hockey League (NHL) for the Hartford Whalers and Philadelphia Flyers. He won 2 Memorial Cups with the Cornwall Royals in 1980 and 1981. He was drafted in the first round, 8th overall, by the Hartford Whalers in 1980. In 1982 he retired from hockey to pursue his dreams and attend medical school. He was born in Toronto, Ontario, but grew up in Haileybury, Ontario.

== Playing career ==
Arthur begun his career by playing with the Cornwall Royals of the QMJHL. He played there for 4 seasons, amassing 192 points in 243 games, for an average of 0.79 points per game.

He was drafted 8th overall in the 1980 NHL entry draft by the Hartford Whalers. For that draft, both The Hockey News and the NHL Central Scouting Bureau ranked him as the 5th best prospect available.

He missed the beginning of his first training camp with the Whalers because he had sprained his ankle. He suffered that injury while crossing a road, when he stepped in a pothole. He played a total of 3 games for the Whalers in 1980–81, getting no points or penalty minutes.

On July 3, 1981, he was traded to the Philadelphia Flyers for Rick MacLeish, Blake Wesley, Don Gillen and several draft picks. Along with Arthur, Ray Allison and several draft picks were sent to the Flyers.

He then played 74 games in the 1981–82 season for the Flyers, getting 8 points and 47 penalty minutes. He had found a place with the team as a defensive defenseman, often playing with Jimmy Watson. The following season, he played in 3 games for the Flyers before retiring on October 25 to pursue a medical career.

Arthur scored his first NHL goal on December 30, 1981, against the Edmonton Oilers in a game most memorable for Wayne Gretzky breaking Maurice Richard's mark of 50 goals in 50 games, with the Great One scoring 5 goals to hit the 50 goal mark in 39 games. Arthur's first NHL goal, the Flyers' fifth of the night, came at the 11:48 mark of the third period on the heels of a goal from teammate Paul Holmgren, putting the Flyers right back in the game at 6 to 5. Arthur's goal closed the score to one, arguably making Gretzky's record-breaking 50th goal possible as it was scored into an empty net, and the Flyers would likely not have their goaltender pulled had the Flyers been trailing by more than one.

In his career, he fought two times, against Garry Howatt and Ron Duguay.

== Retirement ==
In October 1982, the Philadelphia Flyers sent Arthur to the Maine Mariners, their American Hockey League affiliate, while recovering from an injury. Faced with the choice between a professional hockey player or the opportunity to pursue his education in medicine, Arthur chose the latter and retired from professional hockey. He became the only NHL draft pick to choose a medical career over one in hockey. He said that he thought his medical career might be risked by playing hockey. He also said that he did not really enjoy the hockey lifestyle either.

== Personal ==
His father was an attorney while his mother was a nurse.

== Career statistics ==
=== Regular season and playoffs ===
			Regular season					Playoffs
Season	Team	League	GP	G	A	Pts	PIM	GP	G	A	Pts	PIM
1977–78	Cornwall Royals	QMJHL	68	2	20	22	88	9	0	1	1	7
1978–79	Cornwall Royals	QMJHL	72	6	64	70	227	7	0	3	3	28
1979–80	Cornwall Royals	QMJHL	67	5	70	75	105	18	2	12	14	44
1979–80	Cornwall Royals	MC	—	—	—	—	—	5	0	5	5	13
1980–81	Hartford Whalers	NHL	3	0	0	0	0	—	—	—	—	—
1980–81	Cornwall Royals	QMJHL	36	3	22	25	134	19	1	11	12	45
1980–81	Cornwall Royals	MC	—	—	—	—	—	5	0	3	3	10
1981–82	Philadelphia Flyers	NHL	74	1	7	8	47	4	0	0	0	2
1982–83	Philadelphia Flyers	NHL	3	0	1	1	2	—	—	—	—	—
NHL totals			80	1	8	9	49	4	0	0	0	2

=== International ===
Year	Team	Event	GP	G	A	Pts	PIM
1981	Canada	WJC	5	0	2	2	10
Junior totals			5	0	2	2	10

Preceded by Ray Allison	Hartford Whalers first-round draft pick 1980	Succeeded by Ron Francis
