= Martin Linse =

Swedish ice hockey player

- Born: 13 October 1962 (age 62); Sweden
- Height: 192 cm (6 ft 4 in)
- Weight: 87 kg (192 lb; 13 st 10 lb)
- Position: Forward
- Played for: Djurgården
- NHL draft: 214th overall, 1982; Hartford Whalers
- Playing career: 1981–1999

Martin Linse (born 13 October 1962) is a retired Swedish ice hockey player. Linse was part of the Djurgården Swedish champions' team of 1983. Linse made 79 Elitserien appearances for Djurgården.
