= Tim Hrynewich =

Canadian ice hockey player

- Born: October 2, 1963 (age 63) Leamington, Ontario, Canada
- Height: 6 ft 0 in (183 cm)
- Weight: 185 lb (84 kg; 13 st 3 lb)
- Position: Left wing
- Shot: Left
- Played for: Pittsburgh Penguins
- NHL draft: 38th overall, 1982; Pittsburgh Penguins
- Playing career: 1982–1989

Tim Hrynewich (born October 2, 1963) is a Canadian former professional ice hockey left winger who played 55 NHL games for the Pittsburgh Penguins between 1982 and 1984.

== Career statistics ==
=== Regular season and playoffs ===
			Regular season					Playoffs
Season	Team	League	GP	G	A	Pts	PIM	GP	G	A	Pts	PIM
1980–81	Sudbury Wolves	OHL	65	25	17	42	104	—	—	—	—	—
1981–82	Sudbury Wolves	OHL	64	29	41	70	144	—	—	—	—	—
1982–83	Baltimore Skipjacks	AHL	9	2	1	3	6	—	—	—	—	—
1982–83	Pittsburgh Penguins	NHL	30	2	3	5	48	—	—	—	—	—
1982–83	Sudbury Wolves	OHL	23	21	16	37	65	—	—	—	—	—
1983–84	Baltimore Skipjacks	AHL	52	13	17	30	65	—	—	—	—	—
1983–84	Pittsburgh Penguins	NHL	25	4	5	9	34	—	—	—	—	—
1984–85	Baltimore Skipjacks	AHL	21	4	3	7	31	—	—	—	—	—
1984–85	Muskegon Lumberjacks	IHL	30	10	13	23	42	17	8	7	15	39
1985–86	Muskegon Lumberjacks	IHL	67	25	26	51	110	—	—	—	—	—
1985–86	Toledo Goaldiggers	IHL	13	8	13	21	25	—	—	—	—	—
1986–87	Milwaukee Admirals	IHL	82	39	37	76	78	6	2	3	5	2
1987–88	Milwaukee Admirals	IHL	28	6	8	14	39	—	—	—	—	—
1987–88	SaiPa Lappeenranta	FIN	21	13	5	18	48	—	—	—	—	—
1988–89	Fort Wayne Komets	IHL	4	0	1	1	8	—	—	—	—	—
1988–89	Flint Spirits	IHL	5	0	1	1	4	—	—	—	—	—
NHL totals			55	6	8	14	82	—	—	—	—	—
