= Gerry McDonald =

American ice hockey player

- Born: March 18, 1958 (age 67); Weymouth, Massachusetts, U.S.
- Height: 6 ft 3 in (191 cm)
- Weight: 190 lb (86 kg; 13 st 8 lb)
- Position: Defense
- Shot: Right
- Played for: Hartford Whalers
- NHL draft: Undrafted
- Playing career: 1980–1984

Girard "Gerry" McDonald (born March 18, 1958) is an American former professional ice hockey player who played nineteen games in the National Hockey League (NHL) for the Hartford Whalers between 1981 and 1984. He grew up on Elmlawn Road in Braintree, Massachusetts. Gerry graduated from Braintree High School in 1976 and North Adams State College in 1980. Gerry currently lives in Wethersfield Conn and Eastham Mass.

His son, Colin, is a hockey player, formerly playing for the Bridgeport Sound Tigers, the AHL affiliate of the New York Islanders as well as several other teams.

Gerry is retired after being in the Automotive industry as a General Manager and Operations Manager for over forty years.

== Career statistics ==
=== Regular season and playoffs ===
			Regular season					Playoffs
Season	Team	League	GP	G	A	Pts	PIM	GP	G	A	Pts	PIM
1977–78	North Adams State University	NCAA-II	—	—	—	—	—	—	—	—	—	—
1978–79	North Adams State University	NCAA-II	—	—	—	—	—	—	—	—	—	—
1979–80	North Adams State University	NCAA-II	—	—	—	—	—	—	—	—	—	—
1980–81	EHC Krefeld	GER-2	—	—	—	—	—	—	—	—	—	—
1980–81	Tulsa Oilers	CHL	5	0	1	1	2	—	—	—	—	—
1980–81	New Haven Nighthawks	AHL	70	6	23	29	67	4	0	0	0	0
1981–82	Hartford Whalers	NHL	3	0	0	0	0	—	—	—	—	—
1981–82	Binghamton Whalers	AHL	57	3	11	14	42	—	—	—	—	—
1982–83	Binghamton Whalers	AHL	74	8	33	41	62	5	0	4	4	23
1983–84	Hartford Whalers	NHL	5	0	0	0	4	—	—	—	—	—
1983–84	Binghamton Whalers	AHL	72	4	39	43	34	—	—	—	—	—
AHL totals			273	21	106	127	205	9	0	4	4	23
NHL totals			8	0	0	0	4	—	—	—	—	—
