= Ray Allison =

Canadian ice hockey player (born 1959)

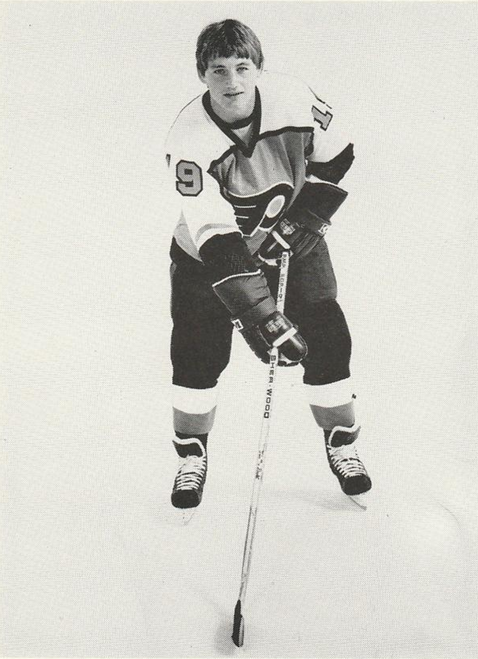
- Born: March 4, 1959 (age 67) Cranbrook, British Columbia, Canada
- Height: 5 ft 10 in (178 cm)
- Weight: 195 lb (88 kg; 13 st 13 lb)
- Position: Right wing
- Shot: Right
- Played for: Hartford Whalers; Philadelphia Flyers
- National team: Canada
- NHL draft: 18th overall, 1979; Hartford Whalers
- Playing career: 1979–1990

Raymond Peter Allison (born March 4, 1959) is a Canadian former professional ice hockey forward who played seven seasons in the National Hockey League for the Hartford Whalers and Philadelphia Flyers. He featured in the 1985 Stanley Cup Final with the Flyers.

Allison was born in Cranbrook, British Columbia.

== Playing career ==
Following a phenomenal junior career, Allison became the first-ever draft pick in the history of the Hartford Whalers/Carolina Hurricanes franchise. He was expected to be a franchise player but failed to impress during his rookie season. A year later, Allison was traded in a ten-player deal to Philadelphia. There he would develop into a scoring forward but suffered a broken ankle during the 1982–83 season. He never regained a regular spot on the Flyers roster and played his last few seasons in the AHL and Swiss leagues.

== Career statistics ==
=== Regular season and playoffs ===
			Regular season					Playoffs
Season	Team	League	GP	G	A	Pts	PIM	GP	G	A	Pts	PIM
1974–75	Brandon Travellers	MJHL	30	10	9	19	49	—	—	—	—	—
1974–75	Brandon Wheat Kings	WCHL	2	0	0	0	0	—	—	—	—	—
1975–76	Brandon Travellers	MJHL	31	22	21	43	158	—	—	—	—	—
1975–76	Brandon Wheat Kings	WCHL	36	9	17	26	50	5	2	1	3	0
1976–77	Brandon Wheat Kings	WCHL	71	45	92	137	198	14	9	11	20	37
1977–78	Brandon Wheat Kings	WCHL	71	74	86	160	254	8	7	8	15	35
1978–79	Brandon Wheat Kings	WHL	62	60	93	153	191	22	18	19	37	28
1979–80	Hartford Whalers	NHL	64	16	12	28	13	2	0	1	1	0
1979–80	Springfield Indians	AHL	13	6	9	15	18	—	—	—	—	—
1980–81	Hartford Whalers	NHL	6	1	0	1	0	—	—	—	—	—
1980–81	Binghamton Whalers	AHL	74	31	39	70	81	2	0	1	1	0
1981–82	Philadelphia Flyers	NHL	51	17	37	54	104	3	2	0	2	2
1981–82	Maine Mariners	AHL	26	15	13	28	75	—	—	—	—	—
1982–83	Philadelphia Flyers	NHL	67	21	30	51	57	3	0	1	1	12
1983–84	Philadelphia Flyers	NHL	37	8	13	21	47	3	0	1	1	4
1984–85	Philadelphia Flyers	NHL	11	1	1	2	2	1	0	0	0	2
1984–85	Hershey Bears	AHL	49	17	22	39	61	—	—	—	—	—
1985–86	Hershey Bears	AHL	77	32	46	78	131	18	4	6	10	28
1986–87	Philadelphia Flyers	NHL	2	0	0	0	0	—	—	—	—	—
1986–87	Hershey Bears	AHL	78	29	55	84	57	5	3	1	4	12
1987–88	EHC Olten	SUI–2	36	33	18	51	103	5	6	3	9	6
1987–88	Hershey Bears	AHL	—	—	—	—	—	9	2	9	11	17
1988–89	EHC Olten	SUI–2	33	23	17	40	40	2	2	0	2	2
1988–89	Hershey Bears	AHL	15	6	11	17	18	12	4	7	11	6
1989–90	Hershey Bears	AHL	70	25	30	55	66	—	—	—	—	—
1990–91	EHC Bülach	SUI–2	35	30	21	51	124	—	—	—	—	—
1991–92	EHC Bülach	SUI–2	34	19	35	54	66	10	7	1	8	14
1992–93	SC Rapperswil–Jona	SUI–2	31	19	13	32	75	7	7	4	11	6
1993–94	SC Rapperswil–Jona	SUI–2	36	17	19	36	52	11	12	5	17	6
AHL totals			402	171	225	386	507	46	13	24	37	63
NHL totals			238	64	93	157	223	12	2	3	5	20

=== International ===
Year	Team	Event	GP	G	A	Pts	PIM
1979	Canada	WJC	5	0	5	5	4
Junior totals			5	0	5	5	4

== Awards ==
- WCHL Second All-Star Team – 1978
- WHL First All-Star Team – 1979

Preceded by Terry McDonald	Hartford Whalers first-round draft pick 1979	Succeeded by Fred Arthur
