= Don Gillen =

Canadian ice hockey player

- Born: December 24, 1960 (age 64); Dodsland, Saskatchewan, Canada
- Height: 6 ft 3 in (191 cm)
- Weight: 210 lb (95 kg; 15 st 0 lb)
- Position: Right wing
- Shot: Right
- Played for: Philadelphia Flyers; Hartford Whalers
- NHL draft: 77th overall, 1979; Philadelphia Flyers
- Playing career: 1980–1984

Donald Gillen (born December 24, 1960) is a Canadian former professional ice hockey right winger who played in 35 National Hockey League (NHL) games with the Philadelphia Flyers and Hartford Whalers. He scored a goal in his first NHL game with the Flyers against Edmonton on January 27, 1980.

== Career statistics ==
=== Regular season and playoffs ===
			Regular season					Playoffs
Season	Team	League	GP	G	A	Pts	PIM	GP	G	A	Pts	PIM
1976–77	Weyburn Red Wings	SJHL	58	13	24	37	170	—	—	—	—	—
1977–78	Brandon Wheat Kings	WCHL	60	18	16	34	128	8	0	1	1	11
1978–79	Brandon Wheat Kings	WHL	64	21	30	51	212	22	10	10	20	34
1978–79	Brandon Wheat Kings	M-Cup	—	—	—	—	—	5	0	1	1	24
1979–80	Brandon Wheat Kings	WHL	69	31	56	87	372	10	5	3	8	43
1979–80	Philadelphia Flyers	NHL	1	1	0	1	0	—	—	—	—	—
1979–80	Maine Mariners	AHL	—	—	—	—	—	7	1	2	3	19
1980–81	Maine Mariners	AHL	79	30	29	59	255	20	4	4	8	49
1981–82	Binghamton Whalers	AHL	42	20	10	30	100	15	6	5	11	23
1981–82	Hartford Whalers	NHL	34	1	4	5	22	—	—	—	—	—
1982–83	Binghamton Whalers	AHL	80	38	39	77	245	1	0	1	1	0
1983–84	Binghamton Whalers	AHL	73	27	37	64	140	—	—	—	—	—
AHL totals			274	111	115	230	740	43	11	12	23	91
NHL totals			35	2	4	6	22	—	—	—	—	—

== Awards ==
- WHL Second All-Star Team – 1980
