= 1981–82 Chicago Black Hawks season =

National Hockey League team season

1981–82 Chicago Black Hawks
- Division: 4th Norris
- Conference: 7th Campbell
- 1981–82 record: 30–38–12
- Home record: 20–13–7
- Road record: 10–25–5
- Goals for: 332
- Goals against: 363

Team information
- General manager: Bob Pulford
- Coach: Keith Magnuson
- Captain: Terry Ruskowski
- Alternate captains: None
- Arena: Chicago Stadium
- Average attendance: 12,698

Team leaders
- Goals: Al Secord (44)
- Assists: Denis Savard (87)
- Points: Denis Savard (119)
- Penalty minutes: Al Secord (303)
- Plus/minus: Keith Brown (+5)
- Wins: Tony Esposito (19)
- Goals against average: Murray Bannerman (4.53)

The 1981–82 Chicago Black Hawks season was the 56th season of operation of the Chicago Black Hawks in the National Hockey League (NHL).

== Offseason ==
During the off-season, the NHL realigned their divisions, and the Black Hawks moved from the Smythe Division to the Norris Division. Joining Chicago in the Norris Division were the Detroit Red Wings, Minnesota North Stars, St. Louis Blues, Toronto Maple Leafs, and Winnipeg Jets, making it the only six team division in the league.

At the 1981 NHL entry draft, the Hawks drafted Tony Tanti with their first-round draft pick. Tanti had 81 goals and 150 points with the Oshawa Generals of the OHL in 1980–81.

== Regular season ==
Chicago had a solid start to the season, opening with a 9–5–6 record in their first 20 games, only two points behind the Minnesota North Stars for first place in the Norris Division. The Black Hawks struggled over the next part of the season, as they quickly fell out of contention for first place, going 14-28-4 in their next 46 games, falling into fourth place. During the slump, head coach Keith Magnuson resigned, as Bob Pulford took over as the interim head coach for the remainder of the season. Chicago finished the season with a 30–38–12 record, earning 72 points, which was good enough for the final playoff spot in the Norris.

Offensively, Denis Savard had a breakout season, scoring 32 goals and a club record 119 points while playing in all 80 games. Al Secord scored a team high 44 goals, and finished with 75 points, while getting a team high 303 penalty minutes. Tom Lysiak had another solid season, scoring 32 goals and 82 points. On defence, Doug Wilson had an excellent season, scoring 39 goals and 85 points, while Doug Crossman emerged with 12 goals and 40 points.

In goal, Tony Esposito had the majority of playing time, going 19–25–8 with a 4.52 GAA in 52 games. Murray Bannerman backed him up with an 11–12–4 record and a 4.17 GAA in 29 games.

=== Final standings ===
Norris Division
	GP	W	L	T	GF	GA	Pts
**Minnesota North Stars**	80	37	23	20	346	288	94
**Winnipeg Jets**	80	33	33	14	319	332	80
**St. Louis Blues**	80	32	40	8	315	349	72
**Chicago Black Hawks**	80	30	38	12	332	363	72
Toronto Maple Leafs	80	20	44	16	298	380	56
Detroit Red Wings	80	21	47	12	270	351	54

Note: GP = Games played, W = Wins, L = Losses, T = Ties, Pts = Points, GF = Goals for, GA = Goals against
Note: Teams that qualified for the playoffs are highlighted in bold.

=== Record vs. opponents ===
Norris Division record vs. opponents

==== Vs. Campbell Conference ====
**Vs. Norris Division**

1981–82 NHL records
Team	**CHI**	**DET**	**MIN**	**STL**	**TOR**	**WIN**	**Total**
Chicago	—	3−3−1	3−3−1	2−4−1	3−4	2−3−2	13−17−5
Detroit	3−3−1	—	1−6	2−5	3−3−1	2−3−2	11−20−4
Minnesota	3−3−1	6−1	—	3−3−1	4−0−3	3−3−1	19−10−6
St. Louis	4−2−1	5−2	3−3−1	—	5−2	1−4−2	18−13−4
Toronto	4−3	3−3−1	0−4−3	2−5	—	2−4−1	11−19−5
Winnipeg	3−2−2	3−2−2	3−3−1	4−1−2	4−2−1	—	17−10−8

**Vs. Smythe Division**

1981–82 NHL records
Team	**CGY**	**COL**	**EDM**	**LAK**	**VAN**	**Total**
Chicago	2−0−1	1−2	1−1−1	3−0	1−2	8−5−2
Detroit	1−1−1	3−0	0−2−1	1−2	1−1−1	6−6−3
Minnesota	1−0−2	1−0−2	0−2−1	2−0−1	1−1−1	5−3−7
St. Louis	2−1	2−1	0−3	1−2	2−1	7−8−0
Toronto	0−1−2	1−0−2	1−2	2−1	0−2−1	4−6−5
Winnipeg	2−1	2−1	1−2	3−0	1−2	9−6−0

**Vs. Wales Conference**

**Vs. Adams Division**

1981–82 NHL records
Team	**BOS**	**BUF**	**HFD**	**MTL**	**QUE**	**Total**
Chicago	2−1	1−2	1−1−1	0−2−1	1−2	5−8−2
Detroit	0−2−1	0−3	0−2−1	1−2	0−3	1−12−2
Minnesota	2−1	1−1−1	2−1	0−1−2	2−0−1	7−4−4
St. Louis	1−1−1	1−2	1−2	0−2−1	1−2	4−9−2
Toronto	0−3	0−2−1	0−3	0−2−1	1−1−1	1−11−3
Winnipeg	0−3	0−1−2	1−2	0−1−2	0−2−1	1−9−5

**Vs. Patrick Division**

1981–82 NHL records
Team	**NYI**	**NYR**	**PHI**	**PIT**	**WSH**	**Total**
Chicago	0−3	0−3	1−1−1	1−0−2	2−1	4−8−3
Detroit	0−3	1−2	0−2−1	2−1	0−1−2	3−9−3
Minnesota	0−2−1	1−2	1−1−1	2−1	2−0−1	6−6−3
St. Louis	0−2−1	0−2−1	0−3	2−1	1−2	3−10−2
Toronto	0−3	1−1−1	1−2	1−0−2	1−2	4−8−3
Winnipeg	1−2	1−1−1	2–1	1–2	1−2	6–8–1

== Playoffs ==
=== Chicago Black Hawks 3, Minnesota North Stars 1 ===
The Black Hawks opened the playoffs with a best-of-five Norris Division semi-final series against the Minnesota North Stars. The North Stars had the best record in the Norris, going 37–23–20, earning 94 points, which was 22 more than the Black Hawks. The series opened with two games at the Met Center in Bloomington, Minnesota. With the game tied at 2–2 at the end of regulation time, the Hawks Greg Fox emerged as the hero in overtime, scoring 3:34 into the extra period, as Chicago won the game 3–2 to take a 1–0 series lead. Chicago goaltender Murray Bannerman made 45 saves in the victory. In the second game, the Black Hawks, led by two goals by Tom Lysiak and 33 saves from Murray Bannerman, defeated the North Stars 5–3 to take both games in Minnesota. The series shifted to Chicago Stadium for the next two games, and the North Stars rebounded with a 7–1 victory in the third game, as Dino Ciccarelli led the way with three goals for Minnesota. The Black Hawks completed the upset in the fourth game, defeating the North Stars 5–2, as goaltender Tony Esposito made 31 saves for the win.

=== Chicago Black Hawks 4, St. Louis Blues 2 ===
In the best-of-seven Norris Division finals, the Black Hawks faced the St. Louis Blues, who finished third in the division with a 32–40–8 record, tying Chicago with 72 points, however, St. Louis held the tie-breaker, as they won two more games during the season. In the first round of the playoffs, the Blues defeated the second place Winnipeg Jets in four games. The series opened with two games at The Checkerdome in St. Louis, Missouri, and in the first game, the Black Hawks took a 2–0 lead after the first period, only to have St. Louis have a 3–2 lead over two periods. In the third period, the Hawks scored two quick goals by Denis Savard and Tom Lysiak to take a 4–3 lead, however, Joe Mullen of the Blues tied it midway through the period. Doug Wilson then scored late in the third, pacing Chicago to a 5–4 win to open the series. St. Louis evened the series in the second game, as Bernie Federko had a goal and assist, while goaltender Mike Liut made 26 saves in a 3-1 Blues victory. The series shifted to Chicago Stadium for the next two games, and the Black Hawks stormed out of the game, scoring three goals in the first 3:01 to take a 3–0 lead. Chicago had a 6–2 lead midway in the third period, however, St. Louis scored three consecutive goals before running out of time, as the Hawks hung on for a 6–5 victory, taking a 2–1 series lead. In the fourth game, the Blues led the game 4-2 midway through the game, however, the Black Hawks would score five consecutive goals, winning the game 7–4, and taking a commanding 3–1 lead in the series. The fifth game was back at The Checkerdome, and the two teams ended regulation time tied at 2-2. In overtime, the Blues Bernie Federko kept St. Louis alive, scoring 3:28 into the extra period, as the Blues avoided elimination with a 3–2 victory. The sixth game was back in Chicago, as the Black Hawks, led by Tony Esposito and his 31 saves, eliminated the Blues with a 2–0 victory.

=== Vancouver Canucks 4, Chicago Black Hawks 1 ===
The Black Hawks would face the Vancouver Canucks in the best-of-seven Campbell Conference finals. The Canucks finished the season with a 30–33–17 record, earning 77 points, five higher than the Black Hawks during the regular season. In the playoffs, Vancouver eliminated the Calgary Flames and Los Angeles Kings to qualify for the conference finals. The first two games were at Chicago Stadium, and in the first game, the Canucks Thomas Gradin opened the scoring at 8:02 of the first period, however, the Hawks Terry Ruskowski quickly evened the score just over two minutes later to tie the game. Those would be the only goals scored in regulation, as the game was sent into overtime. Neither the Black Hawks or Canucks could capitalize during the first overtime period, setting up double overtime. In the second overtime, the Canucks Jim Nill silenced the home crowd, as Vancouver hung on for a 2–1 victory. Canucks goaltender Richard Brodeur made 46 saves in the win, while Tony Esposito have 39 saves in the loss. Chicago evened the series in the second game, as they were led by Denis Savard and his two goals, while Murray Bannerman had 30 saves in a 4-1 Black Hawks victory. The series shifted to Vancouver, British Columbia for the next two games at PNE Coliseum, and in the third game, Glen Sharpley give Chicago a 1–0 lead. However, this lead would not last as Vancouver's two consecutive power play goals would prove too much for the Hawks even though they tied the game at the end of first period. The Canucks would break the tie in 2nd period by Curt Fraser and win the game 4–3 to take a 2–1 series lead. Vancouver took a 3–0 lead midway through the fourth game, however, the Black Hawks, on goals by Glen Sharpley and Denis Savard cut the Canucks lead to 3-2 early in the third. Vancouver then scored two quick goals, and hung on for a 5–3 win, taking a 3–1 series lead back to Chicago. In the fifth game, the Canucks jumped out to a quick 2–0 lead before the Hawks Tom Lysiak scored 5:09 into the game to cut the Canucks lead in half. Vancouver took a 3–1 lead after the first. After a scoreless second period, the Black Hawks cut the Canucks lead to 3–2 with an early third period goal by Grant Mulvey, however, Vancouver took control of the game, and the series, skating their way to a 6–2 victory, eliminating the Hawks.

== Schedule and results ==
=== Regular season ===
1981–82 regular season
October

Game	Result	Date	Score	Opponent	Record
1	T	October 7, 1981	5–5	Pittsburgh Penguins (1981–82)	0–0–1
2	L	October 10, 1981	8–9	@ Toronto Maple Leafs (1981–82)	0–1–1
3	W	October 11, 1981	3–0	Calgary Flames (1981–82)	1–1–1
4	L	October 14, 1981	5–8	Boston Bruins (1981–82)	1–2–1
5	L	October 17, 1981	3–7	@ St. Louis Blues (1981–82)	1–3–1
6	W	October 18, 1981	7–5	Edmonton Oilers (1981–82)	2–3–1
7	T	October 21, 1981	3–3	Montreal Canadiens (1981–82)	2–3–2
8	T	October 23, 1981	5–5	@ Winnipeg Jets (1981–82)	2–3–3
9	T	October 25, 1981	4–4	St. Louis Blues (1981–82)	2–3–4
10	W	October 28, 1981	7–6	Winnipeg Jets (1981–82)	3–3–4
11	T	October 31, 1981	2–2	@ Hartford Whalers (1981–82)	3–3–5

November

Game	Result	Date	Score	Opponent	Record
12	W	November 1, 1981	9–4	Toronto Maple Leafs (1981–82)	4–3–5
13	W	November 4, 1981	5–4	Los Angeles Kings (1981–82)	5–3–5
14	L	November 6, 1981	3–4	@ Winnipeg Jets (1981–82)	5–4–5
15	W	November 8, 1981	10–4	Calgary Flames (1981–82)	6–4–5
16	T	November 11, 1981	5–5	Detroit Red Wings (1981–82)	6–4–6
17	L	November 14, 1981	3–6	@ Detroit Red Wings (1981–82)	6–5–6
18	W	November 15, 1981	10–0	Colorado Rockies (1981–82)	7–5–6
19	W	November 18, 1981	4–3	Buffalo Sabres (1981–82)	8–5–6
20	W	November 21, 1981	6–4	@ Minnesota North Stars (1981–82)	9–5–6
21	T	November 22, 1981	1–1	Minnesota North Stars (1981–82)	9–5–7
22	L	November 25, 1981	2–6	@ Vancouver Canucks (1981–82)	9–6–7
23	L	November 27, 1981	1–8	@ Edmonton Oilers (1981–82)	9–7–7
24	T	November 28, 1981	4–4	@ Calgary Flames (1981–82)	9–7–8

December

Game	Result	Date	Score	Opponent	Record
25	L	December 2, 1981	2–3	@ Colorado Rockies (1981–82)	9–8–8
26	W	December 5, 1981	3–2	@ Los Angeles Kings (1981–82)	10–8–8
27	W	December 9, 1981	7–3	Washington Capitals (1981–82)	11–8–8
28	L	December 12, 1981	3–6	@ Minnesota North Stars (1981–82)	11–9–8
29	W	December 13, 1981	8–3	Hartford Whalers (1981–82)	12–9–8
30	T	December 16, 1981	3–3	Winnipeg Jets (1981–82)	12–9–9
31	W	December 19, 1981	6–4	@ Washington Capitals (1981–82)	13–9–9
32	L	December 20, 1981	1–3	Toronto Maple Leafs (1981–82)	13–10–9
33	L	December 23, 1981	6–7	Philadelphia Flyers (1981–82)	13–11–9
34	W	December 26, 1981	3–2	@ Winnipeg Jets (1981–82)	14–11–9
35	L	December 27, 1981	3–4	St. Louis Blues (1981–82)	14–12–9
36	L	December 29, 1981	1–8	@ Quebec Nordiques (1981–82)	14–13–9
37	L	December 30, 1981	3–6	@ Montreal Canadiens (1981–82)	14–14–9

January

Game	Result	Date	Score	Opponent	Record
38	L	January 2, 1982	3–5	@ New York Islanders (1981–82)	14–15–9
39	W	January 3, 1982	4–3	Detroit Red Wings (1981–82)	15–15–9
40	W	January 6, 1982	6–3	Pittsburgh Penguins (1981–82)	16–15–9
41	L	January 9, 1982	5–7	@ New York Rangers (1981–82)	16–16–9
42	W	January 10, 1982	3–2	Vancouver Canucks (1981–82)	17–16–9
43	L	January 13, 1982	2–6	@ Buffalo Sabres (1981–82)	17–17–9
44	L	January 16, 1982	6–8	@ St. Louis Blues (1981–82)	17–18–9
45	L	January 17, 1982	5–7	@ Minnesota North Stars (1981–82)	17–19–9
46	L	January 20, 1982	4–5	Detroit Red Wings (1981–82)	17–20–9
47	L	January 22, 1982	5–6	@ Winnipeg Jets (1981–82)	17–21–9
48	L	January 23, 1982	4–8	@ Minnesota North Stars (1981–82)	17–22–9
49	L	January 25, 1982	5–6	Hartford Whalers (1981–82)	17–23–9
50	T	January 27, 1982	3–3	Edmonton Oilers (1981–82)	17–23–10
51	L	January 30, 1982	2–5	@ Washington Capitals (1981–82)	17–24–10
52	L	January 31, 1982	2–5	Toronto Maple Leafs (1981–82)	17–25–10

February

Game	Result	Date	Score	Opponent	Record
53	W	February 3, 1982	9–5	St. Louis Blues (1981–82)	18–25–10
54	L	February 4, 1982	4–6	@ Detroit Red Wings (1981–82)	18–26–10
55	W	February 6, 1982	4–3	@ Boston Bruins (1981–82)	19–26–10
56	W	February 7, 1982	5–2	Minnesota North Stars (1981–82)	20–26–10
57	L	February 11, 1982	2–8	New York Islanders (1981–82)	20–27–10
58	W	February 13, 1982	6–4	@ Toronto Maple Leafs (1981–82)	21–27–10
59	L	February 15, 1982	1–4	Vancouver Canucks (1981–82)	21–28–10
60	L	February 17, 1982	2–3	Buffalo Sabres (1981–82)	21–29–10
61	W	February 21, 1982	5–3	Quebec Nordiques (1981–82)	22–29–10
62	L	February 23, 1982	1–5	@ New York Islanders (1981–82)	22–30–10
63	L	February 24, 1982	4–6	@ New York Rangers (1981–82)	22–31–10
64	W	February 27, 1982	5–3	@ Los Angeles Kings (1981–82)	23–31–10
65	L	February 28, 1982	3–5	@ Colorado Rockies (1981–82)	23–32–10

March

Game	Result	Date	Score	Opponent	Record
66	L	March 3, 1982	2–4	Winnipeg Jets (1981–82)	23–33–10
67	W	March 6, 1982	4–1	Philadelphia Flyers (1981–82)	24–33–10
68	W	March 7, 1982	5–1	Boston Bruins (1981–82)	25–33–10
69	W	March 10, 1982	7–6	@ Toronto Maple Leafs (1981–82)	26–33–10
70	L	March 11, 1982	0–4	@ Montreal Canadiens (1981–82)	26–34–10
71	L	March 13, 1982	3–9	@ Quebec Nordiques (1981–82)	26–35–10
72	T	March 18, 1982	4–4	@ Philadelphia Flyers (1981–82)	26–35–11
73	W	March 20, 1982	4–3	@ Detroit Red Wings (1981–82)	27–35–11
74	L	March 22, 1982	5–8	@ Toronto Maple Leafs (1981–82)	27–36–11
75	W	March 24, 1982	6–4	Detroit Red Wings (1981–82)	28–36–11
76	T	March 27, 1982	3–3	@ Pittsburgh Penguins (1981–82)	28–36–12
77	L	March 28, 1982	3–8	St. Louis Blues (1981–82)	28–37–12
78	L	March 31, 1982	1–4	New York Rangers (1981–82)	28–38–12

April

Game	Result	Date	Score	Opponent	Record
79	W	April 3, 1982	7–4	@ St. Louis Blues (1981–82)	29–38–12
80	W	April 4, 1982	4–3	Minnesota North Stars (1981–82)	30–38–12

Legend: Win (2 points) Loss (0 points) Tie (1 point)

=== Playoffs ===
1982 Stanley Cup playoffs
Norris Division Semifinals vs. (N1) Minnesota North Stars – Black Hawks win 3–1

Game	Date	Visitor	Score	Home	Series
1	April 7	Chicago Black Hawks	3–2	Minnesota North Stars	1–0
2	April 8	Chicago Black Hawks	5–3	Minnesota North Stars	2–0
3	April 10	Minnesota North Stars	7–1	Chicago Black Hawks	2–1
4	April 11	Minnesota North Stars	2–5	Chicago Black Hawks	3–1

Norris Division Finals vs. (N3) St. Louis Blues – Black Hawks win 4–2

Game	Date	Visitor	Score	Home	Series
1	April 15	Chicago Black Hawks	5–4	St. Louis Blues	1–0
2	April 16	Chicago Black Hawks	1–3	St. Louis Blues	1–1
3	April 18	St. Louis Blues	5–6	Chicago Black Hawks	2–1
4	April 19	St. Louis Blues	4–7	Chicago Black Hawks	3–1
5	April 21	Chicago Black Hawks	2–3	St. Louis Blues	3–2
6	April 23	St. Louis Blues	0–2	Chicago Black Hawks	4–2

Campbell Conference Finals vs. (S2) Vancouver Canucks – Canucks win 4–1

Game	Date	Visitor	Score	Home	Series
1	April 27	Vancouver Canucks	2–1	Chicago Black Hawks	0–1
2	April 29	Vancouver Canucks	1–4	Chicago Black Hawks	1–1
3	May 1	Chicago Black Hawks	3–4	Vancouver Canucks	1–2
4	May 4	Chicago Black Hawks	3–5	Vancouver Canucks	1–3
5	May 6	Vancouver Canucks	6–2	Chicago Black Hawks	1–4

Legend: Win Loss

== Player statistics ==
=== Regular season ===
Scoring

Player	Pos	GP	G	A	Pts	PIM	+/-	PPG	SHG	GWG
Denis Savard	C	80	32	87	119	82	0	8	0	4
Doug Wilson	D	76	39	46	85	54	1	14	1	3
Tom Lysiak	C	71	32	50	82	84	-8	10	2	4
Al Secord	LW	80	44	31	75	303	-17	14	0	6
Tim Higgins	RW	74	20	30	50	85	-6	6	0	2
Grant Mulvey	RW	73	30	19	49	141	-9	3	0	3
Rich Preston	RW	75	15	28	43	30	0	1	1	1
Doug Crossman	D	70	12	28	40	24	-19	7	0	1
Reg Kerr	LW	59	11	28	39	39	-10	1	0	1
Terry Ruskowski	C	60	7	30	37	120	-13	2	0	0
Darryl Sutter	LW	40	23	12	35	31	0	4	3	0
Ted Bulley	LW	59	12	18	30	120	-1	2	0	2
Bob Murray	D	45	8	22	30	48	1	3	1	0
Peter Marsh	RW	57	10	18	28	47	3	0	0	0
Keith Brown	D	33	4	20	24	26	4	2	0	0
Bill Gardner	C	69	8	15	23	20	-9	1	4	0
Dave Hutchison	D	66	5	18	23	246	4	0	1	0
Greg Fox	D	79	2	19	21	137	-13	0	0	0
Glen Sharpley	C	36	9	7	16	11	2	0	0	2
Rick Paterson	C	48	4	7	11	8	-2	0	0	1
Jerome Dupont	D	34	0	4	4	51	-2	0	0	0
Steve Ludzik	C	8	2	1	3	2	1	0	0	0
Florent Robidoux	LW	4	1	2	3	0	2	0	0	0
Miles Zaharko	D	15	1	2	3	18	-1	0	0	0
Tony Esposito	G	52	0	2	2	0	0	0	0	0
Dave Feamster	D	29	0	2	2	29	-6	0	0	0
John Marks	LW	13	1	0	1	7	0	0	0	0
Murray Bannerman	G	29	0	1	1	0	0	0	0	0
Steve Larmer	RW	3	0	0	0	0	0	0	0	0
Troy Murray	C	1	0	0	0	0	0	0	0	0
Warren Skorodenski	G	1	0	0	0	0	0	0	0	0
Tony Tanti	RW	2	0	0	0	0	0	0	0	0

Goaltending

Player	MIN	GP	W	L	T	GA	GAA	SO
Tony Esposito	3069	52	19	25	8	231	4.52	1
Murray Bannerman	1671	29	11	12	4	116	4.17	1
Warren Skorodenski	60	1	0	1	0	5	5.00	0
Team:	4800	80	30	38	12	352	4.40	2

=== Playoffs ===
Scoring

Player	Pos	GP	G	A	Pts	PIM	PPG	SHG	GWG
Denis Savard	C	15	11	7	18	52	5	0	2
Tom Lysiak	C	15	6	9	15	13	3	0	0
Doug Wilson	D	15	3	10	13	32	0	1	1
Glen Sharpley	C	15	6	3	9	16	0	0	0
Al Secord	LW	15	2	5	7	61	2	0	1
Bob Murray	D	15	1	6	7	16	0	0	0
Grant Mulvey	RW	15	4	2	6	50	1	0	0
Dave Feamster	D	15	2	4	6	53	0	0	1
Rich Preston	RW	15	2	4	6	21	0	0	0
Rick Paterson	C	15	3	2	5	21	0	0	0
Bill Gardner	C	15	1	4	5	6	0	0	0
Tim Higgins	RW	12	3	1	4	15	0	0	0
Greg Fox	D	15	1	3	4	27	0	0	1
Ted Bulley	LW	15	2	1	3	12	0	0	1
Dave Hutchison	D	14	1	2	3	44	0	0	0
Terry Ruskowski	C	11	1	2	3	53	0	0	0
Doug Crossman	D	11	0	3	3	4	0	0	0
Keith Brown	D	4	0	2	2	5	0	0	0
Peter Marsh	RW	12	0	2	2	31	0	0	0
Troy Murray	C	7	1	0	1	5	0	0	0
Murray Bannerman	G	10	0	1	1	4	0	0	0
Darryl Sutter	LW	3	0	1	1	2	0	0	0
Tony Esposito	G	7	0	0	0	0	0	0	0
John Marks	LW	1	0	0	0	0	0	0	0

Goaltending

Player	MIN	GP	W	L	GA	GAA	SO
Murray Bannerman	555	10	5	4	35	3.78	0
Tony Esposito	381	7	3	3	16	2.52	1
Team:	936	15	8	7	51	3.27	1

Note: Pos = Position; GP = Games played; G = Goals; A = Assists; Pts = Points; +/- = plus/minus; PIM = Penalty minutes; PPG = Power-play goals; SHG = Short-handed goals; GWG = Game-winning goals
MIN = Minutes played; W = Wins; L = Losses; T = Ties; GA = Goals-against; GAA = Goals-against average; SO = Shutouts;

== Draft picks ==
Chicago's draft picks at the 1981 NHL entry draft held at the Montreal Forum in Montreal.

Round	#	Player	Nationality	College/Junior/Club team (League)
1	12	Tony Tanti	Canada	Oshawa Generals (OMJHL)
2	25	Kevin Griffin	Canada	Portland Winter Hawks (WHL)
3	54	Darrel Anholt	Canada	Calgary Wranglers (WHL)
4	75	Perry Pelensky	Canada	Portland Winter Hawks (WHL)
5	96	Doug Chessell	Canada	London Knights (OMJHL)
6	117	Bill Schafhauser	United States	Northern Michigan University (CCHA)
7	138	Marc Centrone	Canada	Lethbridge Broncos (WHL)
8	159	Johan Mellstrom	Sweden	Falun (Sweden)
9	180	John Benns	Canada	Billings Bighorns (WHL)
10	201	Sylvain Roy	Canada	Hull Olympiques (QMJHL)

== See also ==
- 1981–82 NHL season
