= 1981–82 Toronto Maple Leafs season =

NHL hockey team season

1981–82 Toronto Maple Leafs
- Division: 5th Norris
- Conference: 9th Campbell
- 1981–82 record: 20–44–16
- Home record: 12–20–8
- Road record: 8–24–8
- Goals for: 298
- Goals against: 380

Team information
- General manager: Gerry McNamara
- Coach: Mike Nykoluk
- Captain: Darryl Sittler (Oct-Jan); Rick Vaive (Jan-Apr)
- Alternate captains: None
- Arena: Maple Leaf Gardens
- Minor league affiliate: Cincinnati Tigers (CHL)

Team leaders
- Goals: Rick Vaive (54)
- Assists: Bill Derlago (50)
- Points: Rick Vaive (89)
- Penalty minutes: Bob McGill (263)
- Wins: Michel Larocque; Vincent Tremblay (10)
- Goals against average: Vincent Tremblay (4.52)

The 1981–82 Toronto Maple Leafs season was the Toronto Maple Leafs 65th season of the franchise, 55th season as the Maple Leafs. The Maple Leafs missed the playoffs for the first time since the 1972–73 season.

== Offseason ==
=== NHL draft ===
Round	Pick	Player	Nationality	College/Junior/Club team
1	6	Jim Benning	Canada	Portland Winter Hawks (WHL)
2	24	Gary Yaremchuk	Canada	Portland Winter Hawks (WHL)
3	55	Ernie Godden	Canada	Windsor Spitfires (OMJHL)
5	90	Normand Lefrancois	Canada	Trois-Rivières Draveurs (QMJHL)
5	102	Barry Brigley	Canada	Calgary Wranglers (WHL)
7	132	Andrew Wright	Canada	Peterborough Petes (OMJHL)
8	153	Richard Turmel	Canada	Shawinigan Cataractes (QMJHL)
9	174	Greg Barber	Canada	Victoria Cougars (WHL)
10	195	Marc Magnan	Canada	Lethbridge Broncos (WHL)

== Regular season ==
=== Final standings ===
Norris Division
	GP	W	L	T	GF	GA	Pts
**Minnesota North Stars**	80	37	23	20	346	288	94
**Winnipeg Jets**	80	33	33	14	319	332	80
**St. Louis Blues**	80	32	40	8	315	349	72
**Chicago Black Hawks**	80	30	38	12	332	363	72
Toronto Maple Leafs	80	20	44	16	298	380	56
Detroit Red Wings	80	21	47	12	270	351	54

Note: GP = Games played, W = Wins, L = Losses, T = Ties, Pts = Points, GF = Goals for, GA = Goals against
Note: Teams that qualified for the playoffs are highlighted in bold.

=== Record vs. opponents ===
Norris Division record vs. opponents

==== Vs. Campbell Conference ====
**Vs. Norris Division**

1981–82 NHL records
Team	**CHI**	**DET**	**MIN**	**STL**	**TOR**	**WIN**	**Total**
Chicago	—	3−3−1	3−3−1	2−4−1	3−4	2−3−2	13−17−5
Detroit	3−3−1	—	1−6	2−5	3−3−1	2−3−2	11−20−4
Minnesota	3−3−1	6−1	—	3−3−1	4−0−3	3−3−1	19−10−6
St. Louis	4−2−1	5−2	3−3−1	—	5−2	1−4−2	18−13−4
Toronto	4−3	3−3−1	0−4−3	2−5	—	2−4−1	11−19−5
Winnipeg	3−2−2	3−2−2	3−3−1	4−1−2	4−2−1	—	17−10−8

**Vs. Smythe Division**

1981–82 NHL records
Team	**CGY**	**COL**	**EDM**	**LAK**	**VAN**	**Total**
Chicago	2−0−1	1−2	1−1−1	3−0	1−2	8−5−2
Detroit	1−1−1	3−0	0−2−1	1−2	1−1−1	6−6−3
Minnesota	1−0−2	1−0−2	0−2−1	2−0−1	1−1−1	5−3−7
St. Louis	2−1	2−1	0−3	1−2	2−1	7−8−0
Toronto	0−1−2	1−0−2	1−2	2−1	0−2−1	4−6−5
Winnipeg	2−1	2−1	1−2	3−0	1−2	9−6−0

**Vs. Wales Conference**

**Vs. Adams Division**

1981–82 NHL records
Team	**BOS**	**BUF**	**HFD**	**MTL**	**QUE**	**Total**
Chicago	2−1	1−2	1−1−1	0−2−1	1−2	5−8−2
Detroit	0−2−1	0−3	0−2−1	1−2	0−3	1−12−2
Minnesota	2−1	1−1−1	2−1	0−1−2	2−0−1	7−4−4
St. Louis	1−1−1	1−2	1−2	0−2−1	1−2	4−9−2
Toronto	0−3	0−2−1	0−3	0−2−1	1−1−1	1−11−3
Winnipeg	0−3	0−1−2	1−2	0−1−2	0−2−1	1−9−5

**Vs. Patrick Division**

1981–82 NHL records
Team	**NYI**	**NYR**	**PHI**	**PIT**	**WSH**	**Total**
Chicago	0−3	0−3	1−1−1	1−0−2	2−1	4−8−3
Detroit	0−3	1−2	0−2−1	2−1	0−1−2	3−9−3
Minnesota	0−2−1	1−2	1−1−1	2−1	2−0−1	6−6−3
St. Louis	0−2−1	0−2−1	0−3	2−1	1−2	3−10−2
Toronto	0−3	1−1−1	1−2	1−0−2	1−2	4−8−3
Winnipeg	1−2	1−1−1	2–1	1–2	1−2	6–8–1

== Schedule and results ==
1981–82 regular season
October

Game	Result	Date	Score	Opponent	Record
1	W	October 6, 1981	6–1	@ Winnipeg Jets (1981–82)	1–0–0
2	T	October 8, 1981	3–3	@ Minnesota North Stars (1981–82)	1–0–1
3	W	October 10, 1981	9–8	Chicago Black Hawks (1981–82)	2–0–1
4	L	October 14, 1981	1–2	Minnesota North Stars (1981–82)	2–1–1
5	L	October 17, 1981	4–6	@ Quebec Nordiques (1981–82)	2–2–1
6	T	October 21, 1981	4–4	Colorado Rockies (1981–82)	2–2–2
7	L	October 23, 1981	2–6	@ Buffalo Sabres (1981–82)	2–3–2
8	L	October 24, 1981	3–5	New York Rangers (1981–82)	2–4–2
9	L	October 27, 1981	5–7	@ St. Louis Blues (1981–82)	2–5–2
10	W	October 28, 1981	5–3	@ Pittsburgh Penguins (1981–82)	3–5–2
11	L	October 31, 1981	5–6	Winnipeg Jets (1981–82)	3–6–2

November

Game	Result	Date	Score	Opponent	Record
12	L	November 1, 1981	4–9	@ Chicago Black Hawks (1981–82)	3–7–2
13	L	November 4, 1981	4–6	@ Edmonton Oilers (1981–82)	3–8–2
14	T	November 6, 1981	4–4	@ Colorado Rockies (1981–82)	3–8–3
15	W	November 7, 1981	9–4	@ Los Angeles Kings (1981–82)	4–8–3
16	L	November 11, 1981	3–4	New York Islanders (1981–82)	4–9–3
17	W	November 14, 1981	4–0	Philadelphia Flyers (1981–82)	5–9–3
18	L	November 18, 1981	5–8	@ Hartford Whalers (1981–82)	5–10–3
19	T	November 20, 1981	3–3	@ Pittsburgh Penguins (1981–82)	5–10–4
20	L	November 21, 1981	3–5	Boston Bruins (1981–82)	5–11–4
21	L	November 24, 1981	3–6	@ Philadelphia Flyers (1981–82)	5–12–4
22	T	November 25, 1981	3–3	@ New York Rangers (1981–82)	5–12–5
23	T	November 28, 1981	4–4	Buffalo Sabres (1981–82)	5–12–6
24	W	November 29, 1981	6–3	@ Detroit Red Wings (1981–82)	6–12–6

December

Game	Result	Date	Score	Opponent	Record
25	L	December 2, 1981	3–5	Hartford Whalers (1981–82)	6–13–6
26	W	December 5, 1981	9–4	Washington Capitals (1981–82)	7–13–6
27	T	December 9, 1981	3–3	Winnipeg Jets (1981–82)	7–13–7
28	L	December 11, 1981	2–11	@ Washington Capitals (1981–82)	7–14–7
29	L	December 12, 1981	2–6	Montreal Canadiens (1981–82)	7–15–7
30	T	December 16, 1981	6–6	@ Vancouver Canucks (1981–82)	7–15–8
31	W	December 19, 1981	8–4	@ Winnipeg Jets (1981–82)	8–15–8
32	W	December 20, 1981	3–1	@ Chicago Black Hawks (1981–82)	9–15–8
33	T	December 23, 1981	4–4	Pittsburgh Penguins (1981–82)	9–15–9
34	W	December 26, 1981	8–3	Detroit Red Wings (1981–82)	10–15–9
35	L	December 27, 1981	3–7	@ Hartford Whalers (1981–82)	10–16–9
36	L	December 30, 1981	4–6	St. Louis Blues (1981–82)	10–17–9
37	W	December 31, 1981	5–2	@ Detroit Red Wings (1981–82)	11–17–9

January

Game	Result	Date	Score	Opponent	Record
38	L	January 2, 1982	2–6	Minnesota North Stars (1981–82)	11–18–9
39	T	January 6, 1982	3–3	@ Minnesota North Stars (1981–82)	11–18–10
40	T	January 7, 1982	4–4	@ Calgary Flames (1981–82)	11–18–11
41	W	January 9, 1982	5–3	Los Angeles Kings (1981–82)	12–18–11
42	L	January 11, 1982	2–5	@ Boston Bruins (1981–82)	12–19–11
43	W	January 13, 1982	2–1	Colorado Rockies (1981–82)	13–19–11
44	L	January 15, 1982	2–8	@ Buffalo Sabres (1981–82)	13–20–11
45	W	January 16, 1982	7–1	Edmonton Oilers (1981–82)	14–20–11
46	W	January 18, 1982	6–2	New York Rangers (1981–82)	15–20–11
47	T	January 20, 1982	4–4	Calgary Flames (1981–82)	15–20–12
48	L	January 21, 1982	2–4	@ Boston Bruins (1981–82)	15–21–12
49	L	January 23, 1982	2–6	@ St. Louis Blues (1981–82)	15–22–12
50	L	January 25, 1982	2–9	Minnesota North Stars (1981–82)	15–23–12
51	L	January 27, 1982	3–4	Winnipeg Jets (1981–82)	15–24–12
52	T	January 30, 1982	2–2	Quebec Nordiques (1981–82)	15–24–13
53	W	January 31, 1982	5–2	@ Chicago Black Hawks (1981–82)	16–24–13

February

Game	Result	Date	Score	Opponent	Record
54	L	February 3, 1982	1–3	@ Vancouver Canucks (1981–82)	16–25–13
55	L	February 6, 1982	1–5	@ Edmonton Oilers (1981–82)	16–26–13
56	L	February 7, 1982	2–8	@ Calgary Flames (1981–82)	16–27–13
57	L	February 10, 1982	1–4	Vancouver Canucks (1981–82)	16–28–13
58	L	February 13, 1982	4–6	Chicago Black Hawks (1981–82)	16–29–13
59	T	February 15, 1982	3–3	Minnesota North Stars (1981–82)	16–29–14
60	T	February 17, 1982	3–3	Detroit Red Wings (1981–82)	16–29–15
61	L	February 18, 1982	3–4	@ Detroit Red Wings (1981–82)	16–30–15
62	W	February 20, 1982	8–5	St. Louis Blues (1981–82)	17–30–15
63	L	February 23, 1982	2–3	@ St. Louis Blues (1981–82)	17–31–15
64	L	February 24, 1982	5–7	@ Minnesota North Stars (1981–82)	17–32–15
65	T	February 27, 1982	3–3	@ Montreal Canadiens (1981–82)	17–32–16

March

Game	Result	Date	Score	Opponent	Record
66	L	March 1, 1982	5–9	New York Islanders (1981–82)	17–33–16
67	L	March 3, 1982	1–4	Los Angeles Kings (1981–82)	17–34–16
68	L	March 4, 1982	1–10	@ New York Islanders (1981–82)	17–35–16
69	L	March 6, 1982	1–6	Montreal Canadiens (1981–82)	17–36–16
70	L	March 10, 1982	6–7	Chicago Black Hawks (1981–82)	17–37–16
71	L	March 13, 1982	2–10	Winnipeg Jets (1981–82)	17–38–16
72	W	March 17, 1982	6–3	Quebec Nordiques (1981–82)	18–38–16
73	L	March 20, 1982	0–7	@ Winnipeg Jets (1981–82)	18–39–16
74	W	March 22, 1982	8–5	Chicago Black Hawks (1981–82)	19–39–16
75	W	March 24, 1982	4–3	St. Louis Blues (1981–82)	20–39–16
76	L	March 27, 1982	1–2	Detroit Red Wings (1981–82)	20–40–16
77	L	March 28, 1982	4–6	@ Detroit Red Wings (1981–82)	20–41–16
78	L	March 30, 1982	3–5	@ St. Louis Blues (1981–82)	20–42–16

April

Game	Result	Date	Score	Opponent	Record
79	L	April 3, 1982	4–6	Washington Capitals (1981–82)	20–43–16
80	L	April 4, 1982	1–7	@ Philadelphia Flyers (1981–82)	20–44–16

Legend: Win (2 points) Loss (0 points) Tie (1 point)

== Player statistics ==
=== Regular season ===
Scoring

Player	Pos	GP	G	A	Pts	PIM	+/-	PPG	SHG	GWG
Rick Vaive	RW	77	54	35	89	157	12	12	5	6
Bill Derlago	C	75	34	50	84	42	5	6	0	2
Wilf Paiement	RW	69	18	40	58	203	-21	6	1	1
John Anderson	RW	69	31	26	57	30	8	7	0	3
Borje Salming	D	69	12	44	56	170	4	1	0	0
Bob Manno	D	72	9	41	50	67	5	3	1	0
Terry Martin	LW	72	25	24	49	39	-18	4	0	1
Darryl Sittler	C	38	18	20	38	24	-14	5	2	0
Rene Robert	RW	55	13	24	37	37	-11	2	0	1
Rocky Saganiuk	RW/C	65	17	16	33	49	-16	0	0	1
Jim Benning	D	74	7	24	31	46	-27	2	0	0
Laurie Boschman	C	54	9	19	28	150	-3	1	0	1
Norm Aubin	C	43	14	12	26	22	-16	3	0	1
Dan Maloney	LW	44	8	7	15	71	-11	1	0	0
Fred Boimistruck	D	57	2	11	13	32	9	0	0	1
Stew Gavin	LW	38	5	6	11	29	-6	1	0	0
Bob McGill	D	68	1	10	11	263	-9	0	0	0
Miroslav Frycer	RW	10	4	6	10	31	-7	1	0	2
Don Luce	C	39	4	4	8	32	-7	0	1	0
Ron Zanussi	RW	43	0	8	8	14	-4	0	0	0
Walt Poddubny	LW	11	3	4	7	8	0	1	0	0
Barry Melrose	D	64	1	5	6	186	-26	0	0	0
Fred Perlini	C	7	2	3	5	0	-2	1	0	0
Paul Marshall	LW	10	2	2	4	2	-4	1	0	0
Trevor Johansen	D	13	1	3	4	4	-16	0	0	0
Jim Korn	D/LW	11	1	3	4	44	1	0	0	0
Michel Larocque	G	50	0	3	3	2	0	0	0	0
Gary Yaremchuk	C	18	0	3	3	10	-7	0	0	0
Billy Harris	RW	20	2	0	2	4	-16	0	0	0
Ernie Godden	C	5	1	1	2	6	1	0	0	0
Bruce Boudreau	C	12	0	2	2	6	-6	0	0	0
John Gibson	D	27	0	2	2	67	-13	0	0	0
Vincent Tremblay	G	40	0	2	2	2	0	0	0	0
Ian Turnbull	D	12	0	2	2	8	-4	0	0	0
Pat Hickey	LW	1	0	0	0	0	0	0	0	0
Paul Higgins	RW	3	0	0	0	17	-1	0	0	0
Greg Hotham	D	3	0	0	0	0	-5	0	0	0
Darwin McCutcheon	D	1	0	0	0	2	-1	0	0	0
Craig Muni	D	3	0	0	0	2	-4	0	0	0
Bob Parent	G	2	0	0	0	0	0	0	0	0

Goaltending

Player	MIN	GP	W	L	T	GA	GAA	SO
Michel Larocque	2647	50	10	24	8	207	4.69	0
Vincent Tremblay	2033	40	10	18	8	153	4.52	1
Bob Parent	120	2	0	2	0	13	6.50	0
Team:	4800	80	20	44	16	373	4.66	1

Note:

Pos = Position;GP = Games played; G = Goals; A = Assists; Pts = Points; PIM = Penalty minutes; +/- = Plus/minus; PPG = Power-play goals; SHG = Short-handed goals; GWG = Game-winning goals
Pos = Position;GP = Games played; Min, TOI = Minutes played; W = Wins; L = Losses; T,T/OT = Ties; OTL = Overtime losses; GA = Goals-against; GAA = Goals-against average; SO = Shutouts; SA = Shots against; SV = Shots saved;SV% = Save percentage;

== Transactions ==
The Maple Leafs have been involved in the following transactions during the 1981–82 season.

=== Trades ===
August 10, 1981	To Los Angeles Kings Bob Gladney; 6th round pick in 1983 – Kevin Stevens	To Toronto Maple Leafs Don Luce
September 11, 1981	To Pittsburgh Penguins Paul Harrison	To Toronto Maple Leafs 4th round pick in 1982 – Vladimir Ruzicka
October 16, 1981	To New York Rangers Pat Hickey	To Toronto Maple Leafs 5th round pick in 1982 – Sylvain Charland
November 11, 1981	To Los Angeles Kings Ian Turnbull (ice hockey)	To Toronto Maple Leafs Billy Harris; John Gibson
January 20, 1982	To Philadelphia Flyers Darryl Sittler	To Toronto Maple Leafs Rich Costello; Ken Strong; 2nd round pick in 1982 – Peter Ihnacak
February 3, 1982	To Pittsburgh Penguins Greg Hotham	To Toronto Maple Leafs 6th round pick in 1982 – Craig Kales; 5th round pick in 1983 – Dan Hodgson
March 8, 1982	To Detroit Red Wings 4th round pick in 1982 – Craig Coxe; 5th round pick in 1983 – Joey Kocur	To Toronto Maple Leafs Jim Korn
March 8, 1982	To Edmonton Oilers Laurie Boschman	To Toronto Maple Leafs Phil Drouillard; Walt Poddubny
March 9, 1982	To Quebec Nordiques Wilf Paiement	To Toronto Maple Leafs Miroslav Frycer; 7th round pick in 1982 – Jeff Triano

=== Waivers ===
February 19, 1982	From Los Angeles Kings Trevor Johansen

=== Free agents ===
Player	Former team
Dave Logan	Philadelphia Flyers
Rick Blight	Vancouver Canucks
Bob Manno	Vancouver Canucks

Player	New team
Tim Coulis	Vancouver Canucks
