= 1981–82 Pittsburgh Penguins season =

NHL team season

1981–82 Pittsburgh Penguins
- Division: 4th Patrick
- Conference: 8th Wales
- 1981–82 record: 31–36–13
- Home record: 21–11–8
- Road record: 10–25–5
- Goals for: 310
- Goals against: 337

Team information
- General manager: Baz Bastien
- Coach: Eddie Johnston
- Captain: Randy Carlyle
- Alternate captains: None
- Arena: Pittsburgh Civic Arena
- Average attendance: 11,299

Team leaders
- Goals: Paul Gardner & Mike Bullard (36)
- Assists: Randy Carlyle (64)
- Points: Rick Kehoe (85)
- Penalty minutes: Paul Baxter (409)
- Wins: Michel Dion (25)
- Goals against average: Gary Edwards (3.67)

The 1981–82 Pittsburgh Penguins season was their 15th in the National Hockey League (NHL). The qualified for the playoffs for the fourth straight year, but lost in the opening round to the eventual Stanley Cup champion New York Islanders three games to two. This would be the Penguins last playoff appearance until 1989.

== Regular season ==
=== Final standings ===
Patrick Division
	GP	W	L	T	GF	GA	PTS
**New York Islanders**	80	54	16	10	385	250	118
**New York Rangers**	80	39	27	14	316	306	92
**Philadelphia Flyers**	80	38	31	11	325	313	87
**Pittsburgh Penguins**	80	31	36	13	310	337	75
Washington Capitals	80	26	41	13	319	338	65

Note: GP = Games played, W = Wins, L = Losses, T = Ties, Pts = Points, GF = Goals for, GA = Goals against
Note: Teams that qualified for the playoffs are highlighted in bold.

=== Record vs. opponents ===
Patrick Division record vs. opponents

==== Vs. Wales Conference ====
**Vs. Patrick Division**

1981–82 NHL records
Team	**NYI**	**NYR**	**PHI**	**PIT**	**WSH**	**Total**
N.Y. Islanders	—	6−2	6−1−1	6−2	7−0−1	**25−5−2**
N.Y. Rangers	2−6	—	4−2−2	4−3−1	3−2−3	**13−13−6**
Philadelphia	1−6−1	2−4−2	—	5−2−1	3−4−1	**11−16−5**
Pittsburgh	2−6	3−4−1	2–5–1	—	5−2−1	**12−17−3**
Washington	0−7−1	2−3−3	4–3–1	2–5–1	—	**8−18−6**

**Vs. Adams Division**

1981–82 NHL records
Team	**BOS**	**BUF**	**HFD**	**MTL**	**QUE**	**Total**
N.Y. Islanders	1−2	1−2	2−0−1	2−1	1−1−1	**7−6−2**
N.Y. Rangers	1−2	2−0−1	1−1−1	1−2	1−1−1	**6−6−3**
Philadelphia	2−1	2−1	3−0	1−2	1−1−1	**9−5−1**
Pittsburgh	1−1−1	1−2	2−0−1	1−2	3−0	**8−5−2**
Washington	0−3	0−3	2−1	2−1	0−2−1	**4−10−1**

==== Vs. Campbell Conference ====
**Vs. Norris Division**

1981–82 NHL records
Team	**CHI**	**DET**	**MIN**	**STL**	**TOR**	**WIN**	**Total**
N.Y. Islanders	3−0	3−0	2−0−1	2−0−1	3−0	2−1	**15−1−2**
N.Y. Rangers	3−0	2−1	2−1	2−0−1	1−1−1	1−1−1	**11−4−3**
Philadelphia	1−1−1	2−0−1	1−1−1	3−0	2−1	1−2	**10−5−3**
Pittsburgh	0−1−2	1−2	1−2	1−2	0−1−2	2−1	**5−9−4**
Washington	1−2	1−0−2	0−2−1	2−1	2−1	2−1	**8−7−3**

**Vs. Smythe Division**

1981–82 NHL records
Team	**CGY**	**COL**	**EDM**	**LAK**	**VAN**	**Total**
N.Y. Islanders	1−0−2	2−0−1	1−1−1	1−2	2−1	**7−4−4**
N.Y. Rangers	2−0−1	2−0−1	0−3	2−1	3−0	**9−4−2**
Philadelphia	3−0	2−1	1−2	2−0−1	0−2−1	**8−5−2**
Pittsburgh	0−1−2	3−0	0−3	1−1−1	2−0−1	**6−5−4**
Washington	3−0	1−2	0−2−1	1−1−1	1−1−1	**6−6−3**

== Schedule and results ==
1981–82 regular season
October: 5–7–2 (home: 4–2–0; road: 1–5–2), 12 points

#	Date	Visitor	Score	Home	Location	Record	Points
1	Oct 6	Pittsburgh Penguins	2–6	St. Louis Blues	The Checkerdome	0–1–0	0
2	Oct 7	Pittsburgh Penguins	5–5	Chicago Black Hawks	Chicago Stadium	0–1–1	1
3	Oct 10	Quebec Nordiques	1–2	Pittsburgh Penguins	Civic Arena	1–1–1	3
4	Oct 11	Pittsburgh Penguins	2–8	Philadelphia Flyers	The Spectrum	1–2–1	3
5	Oct 14	New York Islanders	4–1	Pittsburgh Penguins	Civic Arena	1–3–1	3
6	Oct 17	Minnesota North Stars	2–5	Pittsburgh Penguins	Civic Arena	2–3–1	5
7	Oct 18	Pittsburgh Penguins	2–3	Detroit Red Wings	Joe Louis Arena	2–4–1	5
8	Oct 20	Colorado Rockies	3–5	Pittsburgh Penguins	Civic Arena	3–4–1	7
9	Oct 22	Pittsburgh Penguins	3–3	Calgary Flames	Stampede Corral	3–4–2	8
10	Oct 23	Pittsburgh Penguins	3–8	Edmonton Oilers	Northlands Coliseum	3–5–2	8
11	Oct 25	Pittsburgh Penguins	6–4	Vancouver Canucks	Pacific Coliseum	4–5–2	10
12	Oct 28	Toronto Maple Leafs	5–3	Pittsburgh Penguins	Civic Arena	4–6–2	10
13	Oct 29	Pittsburgh Penguins	4–6	Philadelphia Flyers	The Spectrum	4–7–2	10
14	Oct 31	Buffalo Sabres	1–3	Pittsburgh Penguins	Civic Arena	5–7–2	12

November: 7–1–2 (home: 5–0–1; road: 2–1–1), 16 points

#	Date	Visitor	Score	Home	Location	Record	Points
15	Nov 4	New York Rangers	3–6	Pittsburgh Penguins	Civic Arena	6–7–2	14
16	Nov 7	Philadelphia Flyers	2–7	Pittsburgh Penguins	Civic Arena	7–7–2	16
17	Nov 11	Pittsburgh Penguins	3–2	Washington Capitals	Capital Centre	8–7–2	18
18	Nov 14	Pittsburgh Penguins	3–3	Boston Bruins	Boston Garden	8–7–3	19
19	Nov 18	St. Louis Blues	1–6	Pittsburgh Penguins	Civic Arena	9–7–3	21
20	Nov 20	Toronto Maple Leafs	3–3	Pittsburgh Penguins	Civic Arena	9–7–4	22
21	Nov 21	Pittsburgh Penguins	5–9	Montreal Canadiens	Montreal Forum	9–8–4	22
22	Nov 24	Pittsburgh Penguins	7–1	Quebec Nordiques	Quebec Coliseum	10–8–4	24
23	Nov 25	Montreal Canadiens	1–2	Pittsburgh Penguins	Civic Arena	11–8–4	26
24	Nov 28	Detroit Red Wings	3–5	Pittsburgh Penguins	Civic Arena	12–8–4	28

December: 4–7–2 (home: 4–2–1; road: 0–5–1), 10 points

#	Date	Visitor	Score	Home	Location	Record	Points
25	Dec 2	Winnipeg Jets	2–4	Pittsburgh Penguins	Civic Arena	13–8–4	30
26	Dec 5	Pittsburgh Penguins	1–3	St. Louis Blues	The Checkerdome	13–9–4	30
27	Dec 6	Pittsburgh Penguins	4–7	Buffalo Sabres	Buffalo Memorial Auditorium	13–10–4	30
28	Dec 9	Philadelphia Flyers	4–1	Pittsburgh Penguins	Civic Arena	13–11–4	30
29	Dec 12	Washington Capitals	4–7	Pittsburgh Penguins	Civic Arena	14–11–4	32
30	Dec 14	Pittsburgh Penguins	4–5	New York Rangers	Madison Square Garden (IV)	14–12–4	32
31	Dec 16	Los Angeles Kings	6–7	Pittsburgh Penguins	Civic Arena	15–12–4	34
32	Dec 19	New York Rangers	3–3	Pittsburgh Penguins	Civic Arena	15–12–5	35
33	Dec 20	Pittsburgh Penguins	1–3	Philadelphia Flyers	The Spectrum	15–13–5	35
34	Dec 23	Pittsburgh Penguins	4–4	Toronto Maple Leafs	Maple Leaf Gardens	15–13–6	36
35	Dec 26	Buffalo Sabres	7–5	Pittsburgh Penguins	Civic Arena	15–14–6	36
36	Dec 27	Pittsburgh Penguins	3–5	New York Rangers	Madison Square Garden (IV)	15–15–6	36
37	Dec 30	Washington Capitals	2–6	Pittsburgh Penguins	Civic Arena	16–15–6	38

January: 5–8–2 (home: 4–1–1; road: 1–7–1), 12 points

#	Date	Visitor	Score	Home	Location	Record	Points
38	Jan 2	Hartford Whalers	4–9	Pittsburgh Penguins	Civic Arena	17–15–6	40
39	Jan 3	Pittsburgh Penguins	6–4	Hartford Whalers	XL Center	18–15–6	42
40	Jan 6	Pittsburgh Penguins	3–6	Chicago Black Hawks	Chicago Stadium	18–16–6	42
41	Jan 7	Pittsburgh Penguins	4–5	Detroit Red Wings	Joe Louis Arena	18–17–6	42
42	Jan 9	Vancouver Canucks	3–4	Pittsburgh Penguins	Civic Arena	19–17–6	44
43	Jan 13	Pittsburgh Penguins	1–6	Winnipeg Jets	Winnipeg Arena	19–18–6	44
44	Jan 16	Pittsburgh Penguins	0–4	Calgary Flames	Stampede Corral	19–19–6	44
45	Jan 17	Pittsburgh Penguins	3–3	Vancouver Canucks	Pacific Coliseum	19–19–7	45
46	Jan 20	Boston Bruins	4–5	Pittsburgh Penguins	Civic Arena	20–19–7	47
47	Jan 21	Pittsburgh Penguins	1–6	New York Islanders	Nassau Veterans Memorial Coliseum	20–20–7	47
48	Jan 23	Philadelphia Flyers	5–5	Pittsburgh Penguins	Civic Arena	20–20–8	48
49	Jan 26	Pittsburgh Penguins	2–9	New York Islanders	Nassau Veterans Memorial Coliseum	20–21–8	48
50	Jan 27	New York Islanders	6–3	Pittsburgh Penguins	Civic Arena	20–22–8	48
51	Jan 30	Winnipeg Jets	1–2	Pittsburgh Penguins	Civic Arena	21–22–8	50
52	Jan 31	Pittsburgh Penguins	3–8	Washington Capitals	Capital Centre	21–23–8	50

February: 3–8–2 (home: 2–4–2; road: 1–4–0), 8 points

#	Date	Visitor	Score	Home	Location	Record	Points
53	Feb 3	Minnesota North Stars	9–6	Pittsburgh Penguins	Civic Arena	21–24–8	50
54	Feb 6	Washington Capitals	6–4	Pittsburgh Penguins	Civic Arena	21–25–8	50
55	Feb 7	Pittsburgh Penguins	4–5	Philadelphia Flyers	The Spectrum	21–26–8	50
56	Feb 10	Hartford Whalers	3–3	Pittsburgh Penguins	Civic Arena	21–26–9	51
57	Feb 11	Pittsburgh Penguins	2–4	Montreal Canadiens	Montreal Forum	21–27–9	51
58	Feb 13	Los Angeles Kings	3–3	Pittsburgh Penguins	Civic Arena	21–27–10	52
59	Feb 16	Pittsburgh Penguins	2–6	New York Islanders	Nassau Veterans Memorial Coliseum	21–28–10	52
60	Feb 17	New York Rangers	5–3	Pittsburgh Penguins	Civic Arena	21–29–10	52
61	Feb 20	Philadelphia Flyers	5–6	Pittsburgh Penguins	Civic Arena	22–29–10	54
62	Feb 21	New York Islanders	3–4	Pittsburgh Penguins	Civic Arena	23–29–10	56
63	Feb 25	Pittsburgh Penguins	2–4	New York Islanders	Nassau Veterans Memorial Coliseum	23–30–10	56
64	Feb 27	Edmonton Oilers	4–1	Pittsburgh Penguins	Civic Arena	23–31–10	56
65	Feb 28	Pittsburgh Penguins	4–2	New York Rangers	Madison Square Garden (IV)	24–31–10	58

March: 5–5–3 (home: 1–2–3; road: 4–3–0), 13 points

#	Date	Visitor	Score	Home	Location	Record	Points
66	Mar 3	Boston Bruins	3–2	Pittsburgh Penguins	Civic Arena	24–32–10	58
67	Mar 6	Pittsburgh Penguins	6–4	Quebec Nordiques	Quebec Coliseum	25–32–10	60
68	Mar 7	Calgary Flames	4–4	Pittsburgh Penguins	Civic Arena	25–32–11	61
69	Mar 10	Pittsburgh Penguins	7–2	Washington Capitals	Capital Centre	26–32–11	63
70	Mar 13	Colorado Rockies	2–6	Pittsburgh Penguins	Civic Arena	27–32–11	65
71	Mar 15	Pittsburgh Penguins	3–4	Minnesota North Stars	Met Center	27–33–11	65
72	Mar 17	Pittsburgh Penguins	4–10	Edmonton Oilers	Northlands Coliseum	27–34–11	65
73	Mar 20	Pittsburgh Penguins	5–7	Los Angeles Kings	The Forum	27–35–11	65
74	Mar 21	Pittsburgh Penguins	6–0	Colorado Rockies	McNichols Sports Arena	28–35–11	67
75	Mar 24	New York Rangers	7–2	Pittsburgh Penguins	Civic Arena	28–36–11	67
76	Mar 27	Chicago Black Hawks	3–3	Pittsburgh Penguins	Civic Arena	28–36–12	68
77	Mar 28	Pittsburgh Penguins	6–5	Washington Capitals	Capital Centre	29–36–12	70
78	Mar 31	Washington Capitals	4–4	Pittsburgh Penguins	Civic Arena	29–36–13	71

April: 2–0–0 (home: 1–0–0; road: 1–0–0), 4 points

#	Date	Visitor	Score	Home	Location	Record	Points
79	Apr 2	Pittsburgh Penguins	7–5	New York Rangers	Madison Square Garden (IV)	30–36–13	73
80	Apr 4	New York Islanders	2–7	Pittsburgh Penguins	Civic Arena	31–36–13	75

Legend: Win (2 points) Loss (0 points) Tie (1 point)

== Playoffs ==
The Penguins lost in the division semi-final round (3–2) versus the New York Islanders.

April 7	Pittsburgh Penguins	1–8	New York Islanders	Nassau Coliseum

April 8	Pittsburgh Penguins	2–7	New York Islanders	Nassau Coliseum

April 10	New York Islanders	1–2	OT	Pittsburgh Penguins	Pittsburgh Civic Arena

April 11	New York Islanders	2–5	Pittsburgh Penguins	Pittsburgh Civic Arena

April 13	Pittsburgh Penguins	3–4	OT	New York Islanders	Nassau Coliseum

New York won series 3–2

== Player statistics ==
Skaters

Regular season
Player	GP	G	A	Pts	+/−	PIM
Rick Kehoe	71	33	52	85	–27	8
Randy Carlyle	73	11	64	75	–16	131
Pat Boutette	80	23	51	74	–23	230
Paul Gardner	59	36	33	69	–7	28
Mike Bullard	75	36	27	63	–1	91
George Ferguson	71	22	31	53	–6	45
Paul Baxter	76	9	34	43	–9	409
Greg Malone	78	15	24	39	–24	125
Pat Price	77	7	31	38	2	322
Peter Lee	74	18	16	34	–8	98
Rick MacLeish^{†}	40	13	12	25	–7	28
Doug Shedden	38	10	15	25	–2	12
Gregg Sheppard	58	11	10	21	9	35
Rod Schutt	35	9	12	21	3	42
Mark Johnson^{‡}	46	10	11	21	–14	30
Ron Stackhouse	76	2	19	21	–11	102
Bobby Simpson	26	9	9	18	–3	4
Steve Gatzos	16	6	8	14	0	14
Pat Graham	42	6	8	14	–1	55
André St. Laurent^{†}	18	8	5	13	5	4
Mario Faubert	14	4	8	12	–2	14
Greg Hotham^{†}	25	4	6	10	–6	16
Paul Mulvey^{‡}	27	1	7	8	–7	76
Jim Hamilton	11	5	3	8	2	2
Marc Chorney	60	1	6	7	–11	63
Kevin McClelland	10	1	4	5	6	4
Randy Boyd	23	0	2	2	–5	49
Russ Anderson^{‡}	31	0	1	1	–4	98
Tony Feltrin	4	0	0	0	–3	4
Dave Hannan	1	0	0	0	–2	0
Bennett Wolf	1	0	0	0	0	2
Gary Rissling	16	0	0	0	–2	55
Total		310	509	819	—	2,196

Playoffs
Player	GP	G	A	Pts	+/−	PIM
Paul Gardner	5	1	5	6	0	2
Rick Kehoe	5	2	3	5	0	2
Randy Carlyle	5	1	3	4	0	16
Pat Boutette	5	3	1	4	0	8
Rod Schutt	5	1	2	3	0	0
Greg Hotham	5	0	3	3	0	6
André St. Laurent	5	2	1	3	0	8
Rick MacLeish	5	1	1	2	0	0
Mike Bullard	5	1	1	2	0	4
Kevin McClelland	5	1	1	2	0	5
George Ferguson	5	0	1	1	0	0
Randy Boyd	3	0	0	0	0	11
Pat Graham	4	0	0	0	0	2
Peter Lee	3	0	0	0	0	0
Steve Gatzos	1	0	0	0	0	0
Ron Stackhouse	1	0	0	0	0	0
Paul Baxter	5	0	0	0	0	14
Greg Malone	3	0	0	0	0	4
Bobby Simpson	2	0	0	0	0	0
Marc Chorney	5	0	0	0	0	0
Pat Price	5	0	0	0	0	28
Total		13	22	35	—	110

Goaltenders

Regular Season
Player	GP	W	L	T	GA	SO
Michel Dion	62	25	24	12	226	0
Gary Edwards^{†}	6	3	2	1	22	1
Paul Harrison^{‡}	13	3	7	0	64	0
Nick Ricci	3	0	3	0	14	0
Total		31	36	13	326	1

Playoffs
Player	GP	W	L	T	GA	SO
Michel Dion	5	2	3	0	22	0
Total		2	3	0	22	0

^{†}Denotes player spent time with another team before joining the Penguins. Stats reflect time with the Penguins only.
^{‡}Denotes player was traded mid-season. Stats reflect time with the Penguins only.

== Awards and records ==
- Paul Baxter became the first Penguins player to receive 400 penalty minutes in a season. He did so in a 7–2 loss to New York on April 4, finishing the season with 409 PIMs.
- Mike Bullard established a new franchise rookie record for goals with 36. He topped the previous high of 31 held by Pierre Larouche.
- Ron Stackhouse established a franchise record for goals (66), assists (277) and points (343) by a defenseman. He had led in all categories since the mid-1970s.

== Transactions ==
The Penguins were involved in the following transactions during the 1981–82 season:

=== Trades ===
September 11, 1981	To Toronto Maple Leafs 1982 4th round pick (Vladimir Růžička)	To Pittsburgh Penguins Paul Harrison
September 28, 1981	To New York Islanders Rob Holland	To Pittsburgh Penguins future considerations
December 29, 1981	To Hartford Whalers Russ Anderson; 1983 8th round pick (Christian Duperron)	To Pittsburgh Penguins Rick MacLeish
February 3, 1982	To Toronto Maple Leafs 1983 5th round pick(Dan Hodgson) future considerations (1982 6th round pick--Craig Kales)	To Pittsburgh Penguins Greg Hotham
February 14, 1982	To St. Louis Blues 1984 8th round pick (Don Porter)	To Pittsburgh Penguins right to claim Gary Edwards off waivers from Blues without having to pay a cash waiver price
March 2, 1982	To Minnesota North Stars Mark Johnson	To Pittsburgh Penguins 1982 2nd round pick (Tim Hrynewich)

=== Additions and subtractions ===
Additions
Player	Former team	Via
Pat Boutette	Hartford Whalers	compensation for signing of Greg Millen (1981-06-29)
Kevin McClelland	Hartford Whalers	compensation for signing of Greg Millen (1981-06-29)
Michel Dion	Winnipeg Jets	free agency (1981-06-30)
Paul Mulvey	Washington Capitals	compensation for signing of Orest Kindrachuk (1981-09-04)
Bobby Simpson	St. Louis Blues	free agency (1981-10-01)
Gary Edwards	St. Louis Blues	waivers (1982-02-14)
Andre St. Laurent	Los Angeles Kings	waivers (1982-02-23)

Subtractions
Player	New team	Via
Greg Millen	Hartford Whalers	free agency (1981-06-15)
Orest Kindrachuk	Washington Capitals	free agency (1981-09-04)
Paul Mulvey	Los Angeles Kings	waivers (1981-12-30)
Paul Harrison	St. Louis Blues	waivers (1982-02-08)

== Draft picks ==
The 1981 NHL entry draft was held on June 10, 1981, in Montreal.

Round	#	Player	Pos	Nationality	College/Junior/Club team (League)
2	28	Steve Gatzos	Right wing	Canada	Sault Ste. Marie Greyhounds (OHL)
3	49	Tom Thornbury	Right wing	Canada	Niagara Falls Flyers (OHL)
4	70	Norm Schmidt	Defense	Canada	Oshawa Generals (OHL)
6	109	Paul Edwards	Defense	Canada	Oshawa Generals (OHL)
6	112	Rod Buskas	Defense	Canada	Medicine Hat Tigers (WHL)
7	133	Geoff Wilson	Left wing	Canada	Winnipeg Warriors (WHL)
8	154	Mitch Lamoureux	Center	Canada	Oshawa Generals (OHL)
9	175	Dean DeFazio	Left wing	Canada	Brantford Alexanders (OHL)
10	196	David Hannan	Center	Canada	Brantford Alexanders (OHL)
