= 1981–82 Washington Capitals season =

NHL hockey team season

1981–82 Washington Capitals
- Division: 5th Patrick
- Conference: 9th Wales
- 1981–82 record: 26–41–13
- Home record: 16–16–8
- Road record: 10–25–5
- Goals for: 319
- Goals against: 338

Team information
- General manager: Max McNab; Roger Crozier
- Coach: Gary Green; Roger Crozier; Bryan Murray
- Captain: Ryan Walter
- Alternate captains: None
- Arena: Capital Centre

Team leaders
- Goals: Dennis Maruk (60)
- Assists: Dennis Maruk (76)
- Points: Dennis Maruk (136)
- Penalty minutes: Randy Holt (250)
- Plus/minus: Lee Norwood (+7)
- Wins: Dave Parro (16)
- Goals against average: Al Jensen (3.82)

The 1981–82 Washington Capitals season was the Washington Capitals eighth season in the National Hockey League (NHL). The Capitals did not qualify for the playoffs for the eighth straight year for the first time in franchise history.

== Regular season ==
=== Final standings ===
Patrick Division
	GP	W	L	T	GF	GA	PTS
**New York Islanders**	80	54	16	10	385	250	118
**New York Rangers**	80	39	27	14	316	306	92
**Philadelphia Flyers**	80	38	31	11	325	313	87
**Pittsburgh Penguins**	80	31	36	13	310	337	75
Washington Capitals	80	26	41	13	319	338	65

Note: GP = Games played, W = Wins, L = Losses, T = Ties, Pts = Points, GF = Goals for, GA = Goals against
Note: Teams that qualified for the playoffs are highlighted in bold.

=== Record vs. opponents ===
Patrick Division record vs. opponents

==== Vs. Wales Conference ====
**Vs. Patrick Division**

1981–82 NHL records
Team	**NYI**	**NYR**	**PHI**	**PIT**	**WSH**	**Total**
N.Y. Islanders	—	6−2	6−1−1	6−2	7−0−1	**25−5−2**
N.Y. Rangers	2−6	—	4−2−2	4−3−1	3−2−3	**13−13−6**
Philadelphia	1−6−1	2−4−2	—	5−2−1	3−4−1	**11−16−5**
Pittsburgh	2−6	3−4−1	2–5–1	—	5−2−1	**12−17−3**
Washington	0−7−1	2−3−3	4–3–1	2–5–1	—	**8−18−6**

**Vs. Adams Division**

1981–82 NHL records
Team	**BOS**	**BUF**	**HFD**	**MTL**	**QUE**	**Total**
N.Y. Islanders	1−2	1−2	2−0−1	2−1	1−1−1	**7−6−2**
N.Y. Rangers	1−2	2−0−1	1−1−1	1−2	1−1−1	**6−6−3**
Philadelphia	2−1	2−1	3−0	1−2	1−1−1	**9−5−1**
Pittsburgh	1−1−1	1−2	2−0−1	1−2	3−0	**8−5−2**
Washington	0−3	0−3	2−1	2−1	0−2−1	**4−10−1**

==== Vs. Campbell Conference ====
**Vs. Norris Division**

1981–82 NHL records
Team	**CHI**	**DET**	**MIN**	**STL**	**TOR**	**WIN**	**Total**
N.Y. Islanders	3−0	3−0	2−0−1	2−0−1	3−0	2−1	**15−1−2**
N.Y. Rangers	3−0	2−1	2−1	2−0−1	1−1−1	1−1−1	**11−4−3**
Philadelphia	1−1−1	2−0−1	1−1−1	3−0	2−1	1−2	**10−5−3**
Pittsburgh	0−1−2	1−2	1−2	1−2	0−1−2	2−1	**5−9−4**
Washington	1−2	1−0−2	0−2−1	2−1	2−1	2−1	**8−7−3**

**Vs. Smythe Division**

1981–82 NHL records
Team	**CGY**	**COL**	**EDM**	**LAK**	**VAN**	**Total**
N.Y. Islanders	1−0−2	2−0−1	1−1−1	1−2	2−1	**7−4−4**
N.Y. Rangers	2−0−1	2−0−1	0−3	2−1	3−0	**9−4−2**
Philadelphia	3−0	2−1	1−2	2−0−1	0−2−1	**8−5−2**
Pittsburgh	0−1−2	3−0	0−3	1−1−1	2−0−1	**6−5−4**
Washington	3−0	1−2	0−2−1	1−1−1	1−1−1	**6−6−3**

== Schedule and results ==
1981–82 regular season
October

Game	Result	Date	Score	Opponent	Record
1	L	October 7, 1981	3–5	@ Buffalo Sabres (1981–82)	0–1–0
2	W	October 10, 1981	6–3	Detroit Red Wings (1981–82)	1–1–0
3	L	October 11, 1981	3–6	@ Boston Bruins (1981–82)	1–2–0
4	L	October 14, 1981	4–5	Philadelphia Flyers (1981–82)	1–3–0
5	L	October 15, 1981	2–5	@ Philadelphia Flyers (1981–82)	1–4–0
6	L	October 17, 1981	2–4	Buffalo Sabres (1981–82)	1–5–0
7	L	October 21, 1981	3–6	Quebec Nordiques (1981–82)	1–6–0
8	L	October 23, 1981	2–4	New York Islanders (1981–82)	1–7–0
9	L	October 24, 1981	4–6	@ New York Islanders (1981–82)	1–8–0
10	L	October 28, 1981	0–3	@ Vancouver Canucks (1981–82)	1–9–0
11	L	October 29, 1981	3–4	@ Los Angeles Kings (1981–82)	1–10–0
12	L	October 31, 1981	4–6	@ Colorado Rockies (1981–82)	1–11–0

November

Game	Result	Date	Score	Opponent	Record
13	L	November 4, 1981	1–6	Minnesota North Stars (1981–82)	1–12–0
14	L	November 7, 1981	1–3	New York Rangers (1981–82)	1–13–0
15	L	November 11, 1981	2–3	Pittsburgh Penguins (1981–82)	1–14–0
16	T	November 13, 1981	3–3	Detroit Red Wings (1981–82)	1–14–1
17	W	November 14, 1981	4–0	@ Hartford Whalers (1981–82)	2–14–1
18	W	November 18, 1981	7–1	Colorado Rockies (1981–82)	3–14–1
19	W	November 21, 1981	10–4	Philadelphia Flyers (1981–82)	4–14–1
20	W	November 22, 1981	3–2	@ Philadelphia Flyers (1981–82)	5–14–1
21	T	November 25, 1981	4–4	@ Minnesota North Stars (1981–82)	5–14–2
22	W	November 27, 1981	5–2	Montreal Canadiens (1981–82)	6–14–2
23	L	November 28, 1981	2–6	@ Hartford Whalers (1981–82)	6–15–2

December

Game	Result	Date	Score	Opponent	Record
24	W	December 2, 1981	9–3	Calgary Flames (1981–82)	7–15–2
25	W	December 4, 1981	7–3	Winnipeg Jets (1981–82)	8–15–2
26	L	December 5, 1981	4–9	@ Toronto Maple Leafs (1981–82)	8–16–2
27	L	December 9, 1981	3–7	@ Chicago Black Hawks (1981–82)	8–17–2
28	W	December 11, 1981	11–2	Toronto Maple Leafs (1981–82)	9–17–2
29	L	December 12, 1981	4–7	@ Pittsburgh Penguins (1981–82)	9–18–2
30	L	December 14, 1981	3–6	@ Montreal Canadiens (1981–82)	9–19–2
31	L	December 17, 1981	1–4	@ New York Islanders (1981–82)	9–20–2
32	L	December 19, 1981	4–6	Chicago Black Hawks (1981–82)	9–21–2
33	W	December 20, 1981	3–2	@ New York Rangers (1981–82)	10–21–2
34	L	December 23, 1981	4–7	Boston Bruins (1981–82)	10–22–2
35	T	December 26, 1981	4–4	New York Rangers (1981–82)	10–22–3
36	L	December 27, 1981	2–3	@ Buffalo Sabres (1981–82)	10–23–3
37	L	December 30, 1981	2–6	@ Pittsburgh Penguins (1981–82)	10–24–3

January

Game	Result	Date	Score	Opponent	Record
38	W	January 2, 1982	5–2	Vancouver Canucks (1981–82)	11–24–3
39	W	January 3, 1982	4–3	@ New York Rangers (1981–82)	12–24–3
40	L	January 5, 1982	0–3	@ Quebec Nordiques (1981–82)	12–25–3
41	T	January 7, 1982	3–3	Los Angeles Kings (1981–82)	12–25–4
42	L	January 9, 1982	4–7	@ St. Louis Blues (1981–82)	12–26–4
43	T	January 13, 1982	6–6	Edmonton Oilers (1981–82)	12–26–5
44	T	January 16, 1982	5–5	@ Detroit Red Wings (1981–82)	12–26–6
45	T	January 17, 1982	2–2	New York Islanders (1981–82)	12–26–7
46	L	January 20, 1982	0–3	@ Winnipeg Jets (1981–82)	12–27–7
47	L	January 23, 1982	1–3	@ Boston Bruins (1981–82)	12–28–7
48	T	January 24, 1982	4–4	@ New York Rangers (1981–82)	12–28–8
49	L	January 27, 1982	4–5	New York Rangers (1981–82)	12–29–8
50	W	January 30, 1982	5–2	Chicago Black Hawks (1981–82)	13–29–8
51	W	January 31, 1982	8–3	Pittsburgh Penguins (1981–82)	14–29–8

February

Game	Result	Date	Score	Opponent	Record
52	L	February 2, 1982	6–7	@ New York Islanders (1981–82)	14–30–8
53	L	February 4, 1982	2–5	New York Islanders (1981–82)	14–31–8
54	W	February 6, 1982	6–4	@ Pittsburgh Penguins (1981–82)	15–31–8
55	T	February 7, 1982	5–5	Quebec Nordiques (1981–82)	15–31–9
56	W	February 11, 1982	5–3	@ Calgary Flames (1981–82)	16–31–9
57	L	February 12, 1982	3–5	@ Edmonton Oilers (1981–82)	16–32–9
58	L	February 14, 1982	3–5	@ Colorado Rockies (1981–82)	16–33–9
59	W	February 17, 1982	5–2	@ Los Angeles Kings (1981–82)	17–33–9
60	L	February 20, 1982	3–7	@ Minnesota North Stars (1981–82)	17–34–9
61	W	February 21, 1982	6–3	@ Winnipeg Jets (1981–82)	18–34–9
62	W	February 25, 1982	9–1	St. Louis Blues (1981–82)	19–34–9
63	W	February 27, 1982	7–1	Hartford Whalers (1981–82)	20–34–9
64	L	February 28, 1982	1–4	Edmonton Oilers (1981–82)	20–35–9

March

Game	Result	Date	Score	Opponent	Record
65	W	March 3, 1982	8–4	St. Louis Blues (1981–82)	21–35–9
66	W	March 5, 1982	8–6	Calgary Flames (1981–82)	22–35–9
67	L	March 7, 1982	1–7	@ Philadelphia Flyers (1981–82)	22–36–9
68	L	March 10, 1982	2–7	Pittsburgh Penguins (1981–82)	22–37–9
69	W	March 13, 1982	6–3	Philadelphia Flyers (1981–82)	23–37–9
70	T	March 14, 1982	5–5	@ New York Rangers (1981–82)	23–37–10
71	T	March 17, 1982	6–6	Vancouver Canucks (1981–82)	23–37–11
72	L	March 20, 1982	3–4	New York Rangers (1981–82)	23–38–11
73	L	March 21, 1982	2–3	New York Islanders (1981–82)	23–39–11
74	L	March 23, 1982	1–8	@ New York Islanders (1981–82)	23–40–11
75	W	March 25, 1982	4–3	@ Philadelphia Flyers (1981–82)	24–40–11
76	T	March 27, 1982	4–4	Philadelphia Flyers (1981–82)	24–40–12
77	L	March 28, 1982	5–6	Pittsburgh Penguins (1981–82)	24–41–12
78	T	March 31, 1982	4–4	@ Pittsburgh Penguins (1981–82)	24–41–13

April

Game	Result	Date	Score	Opponent	Record
79	W	April 3, 1982	6–4	@ Toronto Maple Leafs (1981–82)	25–41–13
80	W	April 4, 1982	3–1	Montreal Canadiens (1981–82)	26–41–13

Legend: Win (2 points) Loss (0 points) Tie (1 point)

== Player statistics ==
=== Regular season ===
Scoring

Player	Pos	GP	G	A	Pts	PIM	+/-	PPG	SHG	GWG
Dennis Maruk	C	80	60	76	136	128	-4	20	2	1
Ryan Walter	C/LW	78	38	49	87	142	-3	19	1	3
Mike Gartner	RW	80	35	45	80	121	-11	5	2	5
Bobby Carpenter	C	80	32	35	67	69	-23	7	1	3
Chris Valentine	C	60	30	37	67	92	-15	18	0	5
Bengt-Ake Gustafsson	RW	70	26	34	60	40	-20	3	0	2
Darren Veitch	D	67	9	44	53	54	-17	5	0	1
Greg Theberge	D	57	5	32	37	49	-8	2	0	0
Bobby Gould	RW	60	18	13	31	69	-3	1	0	1
Rick Green	D	65	3	25	28	93	-12	1	0	0
Terry Murray	D	74	3	22	25	60	-14	0	0	0
Gaetan Duchesne	LW	74	9	14	23	46	-6	0	0	1
Torrie Robertson	LW	54	8	13	21	204	-1	3	0	0
Lee Norwood	D	26	7	10	17	125	7	3	0	1
Tim Tookey	C	28	8	8	16	35	-9	5	0	0
Glen Currie	C	43	7	7	14	14	-2	0	1	0
Wes Jarvis	C	26	1	12	13	18	5	0	0	0
Lou Franceschetti	RW	30	2	10	12	23	-4	0	0	1
Timo Blomqvist	D	44	1	11	12	62	-17	0	0	0
Paul MacKinnon	D	39	2	9	11	35	-10	0	0	0
Randy Holt	D	53	2	6	8	250	-7	0	0	0
Jim McTaggart	D	19	2	4	6	20	-2	0	1	1
Tony Cassolato	RW	12	1	4	5	4	1	0	0	0
Roland Stoltz	RW	14	2	2	4	14	-3	0	0	0
Bob Kelly	LW	16	0	4	4	12	-12	0	0	0
Todd Bidner	LW	12	2	1	3	7	0	0	0	1
Jean Pronovost	RW	10	1	2	3	4	-7	0	0	0
Pat Ribble	D	12	1	2	3	14	-4	0	0	0
Alan Hangsleben	D	17	1	1	2	19	-3	0	0	0
Tom Rowe	RW	6	1	1	2	18	0	0	0	0
Al Jensen	G	26	0	2	2	6	0	0	0	0
Howard Walker	D	16	0	2	2	26	-9	0	0	0
Orest Kindrachuk	C	4	1	0	1	2	-4	1	0	0
Mike Siltala	RW	3	1	0	1	2	-1	0	0	0
Doug Hicks	D	12	0	1	1	11	-7	0	0	0
Mike Palmateer	G	11	0	1	1	6	0	0	0	0
Dave Parro	G	52	0	1	1	4	0	0	0	0
Pierre Bouchard	D	1	0	0	0	10	-2	0	0	0
Eric Calder	D	1	0	0	0	0	0	0	0	0
Tony Camazzola	D	3	0	0	0	4	0	0	0	0
Jay Johnston	D	6	0	0	0	4	-2	0	0	0
Jim McGeough	C	4	0	0	0	0	-2	0	0	0
Harvie Pocza	LW	2	0	0	0	2	-2	0	0	0
Errol Rausse	LW	2	0	0	0	0	-2	0	0	0

Goaltending

Player	MIN	GP	W	L	T	GA	GAA	SO
Dave Parro	2942	52	16	26	7	206	4.20	1
Al Jensen	1274	26	8	8	4	81	3.81	0
Mike Palmateer	584	11	2	7	2	47	4.83	0
Team:	4800	80	26	41	13	334	4.17	1

Note: GP = Games played; G = Goals; A = Assists; Pts = Points; +/- = Plus/minus; PIM = Penalty minutes; PPG=Power-play goals; SHG=Short-handed goals; GWG=Game-winning goals
MIN=Minutes played; W = Wins; L = Losses; T = Ties; GA = Goals against; GAA = Goals against average; SO = Shutouts;

== Draft picks ==
Washington's draft picks at the 1981 NHL entry draft held at the Montreal Forum in Montreal.

Round	#	Player	Nationality	College/Junior/Club team (League)
1	3	Bobby Carpenter	United States	St. John's School (USHS-MA)
3	45	Eric Calder	Canada	Cornwall Royals (QMJHL)
4	68	Tony Kellin	United States	Grand Rapids High School (USHS-MN)
5	89	Mike Siltala	Canada	Kingston Canadians (OMJHL)
5	91	Peter Sidorkiewicz	Canada	Oshawa Generals (OMJHL)
6	110	Jim McGeough	Canada	Billings Bighorns (WHL)
7	131	Risto Jalo	Finland	Ilves (Finland)
8	152	Gaetan Duchesne	Canada	Quebec Remparts (QMJHL)
9	173	George White	United States	University of New Hampshire (ECAC)
10	194	Chris Valentine	Canada	Sorel Eperviers (QMJHL)

== See also ==
- 1981–82 NHL season
