= 1981–82 New York Islanders season =

NHL hockey team season (won 3rd Stanley Cup)

1981–82 New York Islanders
- Stanley Cup champions
- Wales Conference champions
- Patrick Division champions
- Division: 1st Patrick
- Conference: 1st Wales
- 1981–82 record: 54–16–10
- Home record: 33–3–4
- Road record: 21–13–6
- Goals for: 385
- Goals against: 250

Team information
- General manager: Bill Torrey
- Coach: Al Arbour
- Captain: Denis Potvin
- Alternate captains: None
- Arena: Nassau Coliseum
- Average attendance: 15,049
- Minor league affiliate: Indianapolis Checkers (CHL)

Team leaders
- Goals: Mike Bossy (64)
- Assists: Mike Bossy (83)
- Points: Mike Bossy (147)
- Penalty minutes: Brent Sutter (114)
- Wins: Billy Smith (32)
- Goals against average: Billy Smith (2.97)

The 1981–82 New York Islanders season was the 10th season in the franchise's history. It involved winning the Stanley Cup.

== Offseason ==
=== NHL draft ===
Round	#	Player	Nationality	College/Junior/Club team (League)
1	21	Paul Boutilier	Canada	Sherbrooke Castors (QMJHL)
2	42	Gord Dineen	Canada	Sault Ste. Marie Greyhounds (OMJHL)
3	57	Ron Handy	Canada	Sault Ste. Marie Greyhounds (OMJHL)
3	63	Neal Coulter	Canada	Toronto Marlboros (OMJHL)
4	84	Todd Lumbard	Canada	Brandon Wheat Kings (WHL)
5	94	Jacques Sylvestre	Canada	Sorel Eperviers (QMJHL)
5	105	Moe Lemay	Canada	Ottawa 67's (OMJHL)
6	126	Chuck Brimmer	Canada	Kingston Canadians (OMJHL)
7	147	Teppo Virta	Finland	TPS (Finland)
8	168	Bill Dowd	Canada	Ottawa 67's (OMJHL)
9	189	Scott MacLellan	Canada	Burlington Cougars (CBJHL)
10	210	Dave Randerson	Canada	Stratford Cullitons (MWJBHL)

== Regular season ==
=== Season standings ===
Patrick Division
	GP	W	L	T	GF	GA	PTS
**New York Islanders**	80	54	16	10	385	250	118
**New York Rangers**	80	39	27	14	316	306	92
**Philadelphia Flyers**	80	38	31	11	325	313	87
**Pittsburgh Penguins**	80	31	36	13	310	337	75
Washington Capitals	80	26	41	13	319	338	65

Note: GP = Games played, W = Wins, L = Losses, T = Ties, Pts = Points, GF = Goals for, GA = Goals against
Note: Teams that qualified for the playoffs are highlighted in bold.

=== Record vs. opponents ===
Patrick Division record vs. opponents

==== Vs. Wales Conference ====
**Vs. Patrick Division**

1981–82 NHL records
Team	**NYI**	**NYR**	**PHI**	**PIT**	**WSH**	**Total**
N.Y. Islanders	—	6−2	6−1−1	6−2	7−0−1	**25−5−2**
N.Y. Rangers	2−6	—	4−2−2	4−3−1	3−2−3	**13−13−6**
Philadelphia	1−6−1	2−4−2	—	5−2−1	3−4−1	**11−16−5**
Pittsburgh	2−6	3−4−1	2–5–1	—	5−2−1	**12−17−3**
Washington	0−7−1	2−3−3	4–3–1	2–5–1	—	**8−18−6**

**Vs. Adams Division**

1981–82 NHL records
Team	**BOS**	**BUF**	**HFD**	**MTL**	**QUE**	**Total**
N.Y. Islanders	1−2	1−2	2−0−1	2−1	1−1−1	**7−6−2**
N.Y. Rangers	1−2	2−0−1	1−1−1	1−2	1−1−1	**6−6−3**
Philadelphia	2−1	2−1	3−0	1−2	1−1−1	**9−5−1**
Pittsburgh	1−1−1	1−2	2−0−1	1−2	3−0	**8−5−2**
Washington	0−3	0−3	2−1	2−1	0−2−1	**4−10−1**

==== Vs. Campbell Conference ====
**Vs. Norris Division**

1981–82 NHL records
Team	**CHI**	**DET**	**MIN**	**STL**	**TOR**	**WIN**	**Total**
N.Y. Islanders	3−0	3−0	2−0−1	2−0−1	3−0	2−1	**15−1−2**
N.Y. Rangers	3−0	2−1	2−1	2−0−1	1−1−1	1−1−1	**11−4−3**
Philadelphia	1−1−1	2−0−1	1−1−1	3−0	2−1	1−2	**10−5−3**
Pittsburgh	0−1−2	1−2	1−2	1−2	0−1−2	2−1	**5−9−4**
Washington	1−2	1−0−2	0−2−1	2−1	2−1	2−1	**8−7−3**

**Vs. Smythe Division**

1981–82 NHL records
Team	**CGY**	**COL**	**EDM**	**LAK**	**VAN**	**Total**
N.Y. Islanders	1−0−2	2−0−1	1−1−1	1−2	2−1	**7−4−4**
N.Y. Rangers	2−0−1	2−0−1	0−3	2−1	3−0	**9−4−2**
Philadelphia	3−0	2−1	1−2	2−0−1	0−2−1	**8−5−2**
Pittsburgh	0−1−2	3−0	0−3	1−1−1	2−0−1	**6−5−4**
Washington	3−0	1−2	0−2−1	1−1−1	1−1−1	**6−6−3**

== Schedule and results ==
=== Regular season ===
1981–82 regular season
October

Game	Result	Date	Score	Opponent	Record
1	W	October 7, 1981	4–1	@ Los Angeles Kings (1981–82)	1–0–0
2	T	October 10, 1981	2–2	@ Colorado Rockies (1981–82)	1–0–1
3	W	October 14, 1981	4–1	@ Pittsburgh Penguins (1981–82)	2–0–1
4	W	October 15, 1981	4–1	Vancouver Canucks (1981–82)	3–0–1
5	W	October 17, 1981	5–4	New York Rangers (1981–82)	4–0–1
6	L	October 20, 1981	6–9	Los Angeles Kings (1981–82)	4–1–1
7	W	October 23, 1981	4–2	@ Washington Capitals (1981–82)	5–1–1
8	W	October 24, 1981	6–4	Washington Capitals (1981–82)	6–1–1
9	W	October 27, 1981	4–3	Edmonton Oilers (1981–82)	7–1–1
10	T	October 29, 1981	6–6	@ Hartford Whalers (1981–82)	7–1–2
11	W	October 31, 1981	2–1	@ Montreal Canadiens (1981–82)	8–1–2

November

Game	Result	Date	Score	Opponent	Record
12	T	November 3, 1981	2–2	Calgary Flames (1981–82)	8–1–3
13	L	November 7, 1981	2–6	Buffalo Sabres (1981–82)	8–2–3
14	W	November 10, 1981	5–3	@ Winnipeg Jets (1981–82)	9–2–3
15	W	November 11, 1981	4–3	@ Toronto Maple Leafs (1981–82)	10–2–3
16	T	November 14, 1981	5–5	Edmonton Oilers (1981–82)	10–2–4
17	L	November 15, 1981	4–5	@ Philadelphia Flyers (1981–82)	10–3–4
18	L	November 17, 1981	2–7	@ Quebec Nordiques (1981–82)	10–4–4
19	W	November 21, 1981	4–3	New York Rangers (1981–82)	11–4–4
20	W	November 22, 1981	7–2	@ New York Rangers (1981–82)	12–4–4
21	W	November 24, 1981	3–1	Boston Bruins (1981–82)	13–4–4
22	W	November 26, 1981	9–2	St. Louis Blues (1981–82)	14–4–4
23	L	November 28, 1981	4–5	@ Boston Bruins (1981–82)	14–5–4
24	L	November 29, 1981	2–5	@ Buffalo Sabres (1981–82)	14–6–4

December

Game	Result	Date	Score	Opponent	Record
25	W	December 5, 1981	8–5	@ Minnesota North Stars (1981–82)	15–6–4
26	L	December 6, 1981	2–5	@ Winnipeg Jets (1981–82)	15–7–4
27	L	December 9, 1981	3–4	@ Vancouver Canucks (1981–82)	15–8–4
28	T	December 12, 1981	3–3	@ Calgary Flames (1981–82)	15–8–5
29	L	December 13, 1981	3–4	@ Edmonton Oilers (1981–82)	15–9–5
30	W	December 15, 1981	10–7	Quebec Nordiques (1981–82)	16–9–5
31	W	December 17, 1981	4–1	Washington Capitals (1981–82)	17–9–5
32	W	December 19, 1981	5–1	Detroit Red Wings (1981–82)	18–9–5
33	W	December 20, 1981	5–3	@ Detroit Red Wings (1981–82)	19–9–5
34	W	December 22, 1981	5–2	Winnipeg Jets (1981–82)	20–9–5
35	W	December 26, 1981	4–2	Philadelphia Flyers (1981–82)	21–9–5
36	L	December 29, 1981	4–5	Montreal Canadiens (1981–82)	21–10–5
37	L	December 30, 1981	4–6	@ New York Rangers (1981–82)	21–11–5

January

Game	Result	Date	Score	Opponent	Record
38	W	January 2, 1982	5–3	Chicago Black Hawks (1981–82)	22–11–5
39	W	January 4, 1982	4–1	Vancouver Canucks (1981–82)	23–11–5
40	W	January 7, 1982	5–4	@ Philadelphia Flyers (1981–82)	24–11–5
41	W	January 9, 1982	3–1	Philadelphia Flyers (1981–82)	25–11–5
42	L	January 14, 1982	4–5	@ Boston Bruins (1981–82)	25–12–5
43	T	January 17, 1982	2–2	@ Washington Capitals (1981–82)	25–12–6
44	L	January 20, 1982	2–3	@ New York Rangers (1981–82)	25–13–6
45	W	January 21, 1982	6–1	Pittsburgh Penguins (1981–82)	26–13–6
46	W	January 23, 1982	6–1	New York Rangers (1981–82)	27–13–6
47	W	January 26, 1982	9–2	Pittsburgh Penguins (1981–82)	28–13–6
48	W	January 27, 1982	6–3	@ Pittsburgh Penguins (1981–82)	29–13–6
49	W	January 30, 1982	4–2	Minnesota North Stars (1981–82)	30–13–6

February

Game	Result	Date	Score	Opponent	Record
50	W	February 2, 1982	7–6	Washington Capitals (1981–82)	31–13–6
51	W	February 4, 1982	5–2	@ Washington Capitals (1981–82)	32–13–6
52	W	February 6, 1982	6–2	Detroit Red Wings (1981–82)	33–13–6
53	W	February 7, 1982	7–3	@ Buffalo Sabres (1981–82)	34–13–6
54	W	February 11, 1982	8–2	@ Chicago Black Hawks (1981–82)	35–13–6
55	W	February 13, 1982	8–2	Philadelphia Flyers (1981–82)	36–13–6
56	W	February 14, 1982	9–1	@ Hartford Whalers (1981–82)	37–13–6
57	W	February 16, 1982	6–2	Pittsburgh Penguins (1981–82)	38–13–6
58	W	February 18, 1982	7–4	@ Philadelphia Flyers (1981–82)	39–13–6
59	W	February 20, 1982	3–2	Colorado Rockies (1981–82)	40–13–6
60	L	February 21, 1982	3–4	@ Pittsburgh Penguins (1981–82)	40–14–6
61	W	February 23, 1982	5–1	Chicago Black Hawks (1981–82)	41–14–6
62	W	February 25, 1982	4–2	Pittsburgh Penguins (1981–82)	42–14–6
63	T	February 27, 1982	5–5	Quebec Nordiques (1981–82)	42–14–7

March

Game	Result	Date	Score	Opponent	Record
64	W	March 1, 1982	9–5	@ Toronto Maple Leafs (1981–82)	43–14–7
65	W	March 2, 1982	6–3	Calgary Flames (1981–82)	44–14–7
66	W	March 4, 1982	10–1	Toronto Maple Leafs (1981–82)	45–14–7
67	W	March 6, 1982	6–4	New York Rangers (1981–82)	46–14–7
68	W	March 9, 1982	6–4	@ St. Louis Blues (1981–82)	47–14–7
69	T	March 10, 1982	4–4	@ Minnesota North Stars (1981–82)	47–14–8
70	L	March 13, 1982	0–3	@ Los Angeles Kings (1981–82)	47–15–8
71	W	March 17, 1982	5–2	@ Colorado Rockies (1981–82)	48–15–8
72	T	March 20, 1982	3–3	St. Louis Blues (1981–82)	48–15–9
73	W	March 21, 1982	3–2	@ Washington Capitals (1981–82)	49–15–9
74	W	March 23, 1982	8–1	Washington Capitals (1981–82)	50–15–9
75	W	March 25, 1982	3–1	Montreal Canadiens (1981–82)	51–15–9
76	W	March 27, 1982	5–4	Hartford Whalers (1981–82)	52–15–9
77	W	March 29, 1982	7–3	@ New York Rangers (1981–82)	53–15–9

April

Game	Result	Date	Score	Opponent	Record
78	T	April 1, 1982	3–3	@ Philadelphia Flyers (1981–82)	53–15–10
79	W	April 3, 1982	6–3	Philadelphia Flyers (1981–82)	54–15–10
80	L	April 4, 1982	2–7	@ Pittsburgh Penguins (1981–82)	54–16–10

Legend: Win (2 points) Loss (0 points) Tie (1 point)

== Player statistics ==
Regular season
Scoring

Player	Pos	GP	G	A	Pts	PIM	+/-	PPG	SHG	GWG
Mike Bossy	RW	80	64	83	147	22	69	17	0	10
Bryan Trottier	C	80	50	79	129	88	70	18	2	10
John Tonelli	LW	80	35	58	93	57	48	5	0	5
Clark Gillies	LW	79	38	39	77	75	39	8	0	5
Denis Potvin	D	60	24	37	61	83	38	11	1	4
Bob Bourne	C	76	27	26	53	77	27	5	2	2
Duane Sutter	RW	77	18	35	53	100	23	4	0	0
Mike McEwen	D	73	10	39	49	50	30	1	0	1
Bob Nystrom	RW	74	22	25	47	103	13	0	0	4
Brent Sutter	C	43	21	22	43	114	28	3	0	1
Stefan Persson	D	70	6	37	43	99	35	3	0	2
Anders Kallur	RW	58	18	22	40	18	5	2	3	3
Wayne Merrick	C	68	12	27	39	20	4	1	0	3
Tomas Jonsson	D	70	9	25	34	51	26	0	0	1
Butch Goring	C	67	15	17	32	10	-3	1	5	1
Billy Carroll	C	72	9	20	29	32	12	0	3	1
Dave Langevin	D	73	1	20	21	82	34	0	0	0
Ken Morrow	D	75	1	18	19	56	53	0	0	0
Hector Marini	RW	30	4	9	13	53	3	1	0	1
Gord Lane	D	51	0	13	13	98	26	0	0	0
Greg Gilbert	LW	1	1	0	1	0	0	0	0	0
Billy Smith	G	46	0	1	1	24	0	0	0	0
Paul Boutilier	D	1	0	0	0	0	0	0	0	0
Neil Hawryliw	RW	1	0	0	0	0	0	0	0	0
Roland Melanson	G	36	0	0	0	14	0	0	0	0

Goaltending

Player	MIN	GP	W	L	T	GA	GAA	SO
Billy Smith	2685	46	32	9	4	133	2.97	0
Roland Melanson	2115	36	22	7	6	114	3.23	0
Team:	4800	80	54	16	10	247	3.09	0

Playoffs
Scoring

Player	Pos	GP	G	A	Pts	PIM	PPG	SHG	GWG
Bryan Trottier	C	19	6	23	29	40	2	0	2
Mike Bossy	RW	19	17	10	27	0	6	0	3
Denis Potvin	D	19	5	16	21	30	3	0	0
Bob Bourne	C	19	9	7	16	36	3	1	0
John Tonelli	LW	19	6	10	16	18	1	0	1
Stefan Persson	D	13	1	14	15	9	1	0	0
Clark Gillies	LW	19	8	6	14	34	4	0	3
Wayne Merrick	C	19	6	6	12	6	0	0	1
Butch Goring	C	19	6	5	11	12	1	0	2
Bob Nystrom	RW	15	5	5	10	32	0	0	0
Duane Sutter	RW	19	5	5	10	57	0	0	2
Mike McEwen	D	15	3	7	10	18	2	0	0
Brent Sutter	C	19	2	6	8	36	0	0	0
Anders Kallur	RW	19	1	6	7	8	0	1	0
Dave Langevin	D	19	2	4	6	16	0	0	1
Billy Carroll	C	19	2	2	4	8	0	2	0
Gord Lane	D	19	0	4	4	61	0	0	0
Ken Morrow	D	19	0	4	4	8	0	0	0
Greg Gilbert	LW	4	1	1	2	2	0	0	0
Tomas Jonsson	D	10	0	2	2	21	0	0	0
Roland Melanson	G	3	0	0	0	0	0	0	0
Billy Smith	G	18	0	0	0	6	0	0	0

Goaltending

Player	MIN	GP	W	L	GA	GAA	SO
Billy Smith	1120	18	15	3	47	2.52	1
Roland Melanson	64	3	0	1	5	4.69	0
Team:	1184	19	15	4	52	2.64	1

Note: Pos = Position; GP = Games played; G = Goals; A = Assists; Pts = Points; +/- = plus/minus; PIM = Penalty minutes; PPG = Power-play goals; SHG = Short-handed goals; GWG = Game-winning goals
MIN = Minutes played; W = Wins; L = Losses; T = Ties; GA = Goals-against; GAA = Goals-against average; SO = Shutouts;

== Record winning streak ==
From January 21 to February 20, the Islanders set a National Hockey League record by winning 15 consecutive games. Since regular-season overtime did not yet exist, all of these games had to be (and were) won in regulation time. During the streak, the Islanders outscored the opposition 97-35 for a +62 goal differential over the 15 games. The record was surpassed in 1993 by the Pittsburgh Penguins, who won 17 consecutive games, two of which were in overtime.

== Playoffs ==
=== Patrick Division semi-finals ===
==== Islanders vs. Pittsburgh Penguins ====
The Islanders won the first two games of the best-of-5 series, outscoring Pittsburgh 15–3. The Penguins then came back to even the series with two victories of their own. In Game 5, the Islanders came from behind to win in overtime. The tying and winning goals were both scored by John Tonelli.

- April 7 Islanders 8, Penguins 1
- April 8 Islanders 7, Penguins 2
- April 10 Penguins 2, Islanders 1(OT)
- April 11 Penguins 5, Islanders 2
- April 13 Islanders 4, Penguins 3(OT)

Islanders win series, 3 games to 2

=== Patrick Division Finals ===
==== Islanders vs. New York Rangers ====
After losing the opener, their first loss at home since December 29, the Islanders came back to win the next three games and, eventually, the series in six. The key goals were Bryan Trottier's overtime winner of Game 3 and Dave Langevin's in the third period of Game 6 that proved to be the series clincher.

- April 15 Rangers 5, Islanders 4
- April 16 Islanders 7, Rangers 2
- April 18 Islanders 4, Rangers 3(OT)
- April 19 Islanders 5, Rangers 3
- April 21 Rangers 4, Islanders 2
- April 23 Islanders 5, Rangers 3

Islanders win series, 4 games to 2

=== Wales Conference Finals ===
==== Islanders vs. Quebec Nordiques ====
The Islanders defeated the Nords decisively in the first two games played at the Nassau Coliseum. In Quebec, they won Game 3 in overtime on a goal scored by Wayne Merrick and finished the sweep three days later to advance to the Finals.

- April 27 Islanders 4, Nordiques 1
- April 29 Islanders 5, Nordiques 2
- May 1 Islanders 5, Nordiques 4(OT)
- May 4 Islanders 4, Nordiques 2

Islanders win series, 4 games to 0

=== Stanley Cup Finals ===
==== New York Islanders vs. Vancouver Canucks ====
The Canucks had their best chance to win a game in the first one, as a Jim Nill short-handed marker gave them a 5–4 lead with only seven minutes to play in regulation time. However, the Islanders tied it when Mike Bossy banged home a loose puck after goaltender Richard Brodeur had collided with his own defenceman, Harold Snepsts, while trying to smother it. In the dying seconds of the first overtime period, Snepsts attempted to clear the puck up the middle, but it was intercepted by Bossy, who completed his hat trick with two seconds left on the clock to win the game for the Islanders. In game two, the Canucks led 4–3 after two periods, but the Isles came back to win again.

The series then shifted to Vancouver, where the Canucks were boosted by a boisterous, towel-waving Vancouver crowd and had a great first period, but failed to score on Billy Smith, who was brilliant. The Islanders went on to win 3–0, and then completed the sweep with a 3–1 victory on May 16 to win their third straight Cup.

Mike Bossy scored 7 goals in the four games and won the Conn Smythe Trophy.

Date	Visitors	Score	Home	Score	Notes
May 8	Vancouver	5	New York	6	OT
May 11	Vancouver	4	New York	6	
May 13	New York	3	Vancouver	0	
May 16	New York	3	Vancouver	1	

Islanders win series, 4 games to 0

== Awards and records ==
- Mike Bossy, Conn Smythe Trophy
- Mike Bossy, Runner-Up, Lady Byng Trophy

Preceded by New York Islanders; 1981	New York Islanders; Stanley Cup Champions; 1982	Succeeded by New York Islanders; 1983
