= Steve Gatzos =

Canadian ice hockey player

- Born: June 22, 1961 (age 64) Toronto, Ontario, Canada
- Height: 5 ft 11 in (180 cm)
- Weight: 185 lb (84 kg; 13 st 3 lb)
- Position: Right wing
- Shot: Right
- Played for: Pittsburgh Penguins
- NHL draft: 28th overall, 1981; Pittsburgh Penguins
- Playing career: 1981–1993

Steve Gatzos (born June 22, 1961) is a Canadian former professional ice hockey player who played 89 games in the National Hockey League. He played with the Pittsburgh Penguins. As a youth, he played in the 1974 Quebec International Pee-Wee Hockey Tournament with a minor ice hockey team from Toronto.

== Career statistics ==
			Regular Season					Playoffs
Season	Team	League	GP	G	A	Pts	PIM	GP	G	A	Pts	PIM
1978–79	Sault Ste. Marie Greyhounds	OHA	36	3	9	12	21	—	—	—	—	—
1979–80	Sault Ste. Marie Greyhounds	OHA	64	36	38	74	64	—	—	—	—	—
1980–81	Sault Ste. Marie Greyhounds	OHL	68	78	50	128	114	—	—	—	—	—
1981–82	Pittsburgh Penguins	NHL	16	6	8	14	14	1	0	0	0	0
1981–82	Erie Blades	AHL	54	18	19	37	67	—	—	—	—	—
1982–83	Baltimore Skipjacks	AHL	12	5	4	9	22	—	—	—	—	—
1982–83	Pittsburgh Penguins	NHL	44	6	7	13	52	—	—	—	—	—
1983–84	Baltimore Skipjacks	AHL	48	14	19	33	43	—	—	—	—	—
1983–84	Pittsburgh Penguins	NHL	23	3	3	6	15	—	—	—	—	—
1984–85	Baltimore Skipjacks	AHL	44	26	13	39	55	15	8	6	14	24
1984–85	Pittsburgh Penguins	NHL	6	0	2	2	2	—	—	—	—	—
1984–85	Muskegon Lumberjacks	IHL	24	18	10	28	24	—	—	—	—	—
1985–86	Baltimore Skipjacks	AHL	53	25	8	33	34	—	—	—	—	—
1988–89	SaiPa Lappeenranta	SM-liiga	41	27	18	45	62	—	—	—	—	—
1990–91	Roanoke Valley Rebels	ECHL	16	14	13	27	2	—	—	—	—	—
1990–91	Fife Flyers	BHL	17	29	24	53	43	—	—	—	—	—
1992–93	Roanoke Valley Rampage	ECHL	1	1	1	2	0	—	—	—	—	—
NHL totals			89	15	20	35	83	1	0	0	0	0
