= Greg Fox (ice hockey) =

Canadian retired ice hockey defenceman

- Born: August 12, 1953 (age 72) Kelowna, British Columbia, Canada
- Height: 6 ft 2 in (188 cm)
- Weight: 190 lb (86 kg; 13 st 8 lb)
- Position: Defence
- Shot: Left
- Played for: Atlanta Flames; Pittsburgh Penguins; Chicago Black Hawks
- NHL draft: 162nd Overall, 1973; Atlanta Flames
- Playing career: 1976–1985

Gregory Brent Fox (born August 12, 1953) is a Canadian former professional ice hockey defenceman who played for the Atlanta Flames, Chicago Black Hawks and Pittsburgh Penguins of the National Hockey League (NHL) between 1977 and 1985. He helped the Blackhawks reach the NHL playoff semi-finals in 1982 and 1983.

Prior to turning professional Fox played for the University of Michigan.

Fox now franchises 30 Domino Pizza stores in Atlanta, Georgia and Columbia, South Carolina. Ran under the franchise name "Pizza the Pie".

== Career statistics ==
=== Regular season and playoffs ===
			Regular season					Playoffs
Season	Team	League	GP	G	A	Pts	PIM	GP	G	A	Pts	PIM
1971–72	Kelowna Buckaroos	BCJHL	53	9	35	44	161	—	—	—	—	—
1972–73	University of Michigan	Big-10	30	2	15	17	68	—	—	—	—	—
1973–74	University of Michigan	Big-10	32	0	11	11	64	—	—	—	—	—
1974–75	University of Michigan	Big-10	36	0	19	19	80	—	—	—	—	—
1975–76	University of Michigan	Big-10	39	1	21	22	99	—	—	—	—	—
1976–77	Greensboro Generals	SHL	4	0	0	0	0	—	—	—	—	—
1976–77	Tulsa Oilers	CHL	10	1	7	8	6	—	—	—	—	—
1976–77	Nova Scotia Voyageurs	AHL	56	2	14	16	110	12	0	4	4	8
1977–78	Nova Scotia Voyageurs	AHL	51	2	10	12	124	9	2	3	5	38
1977–78	Atlanta Flames	NHL	16	1	2	3	25	2	0	1	1	8
1978–79	Atlanta Flames	NHL	64	0	12	12	70	—	—	—	—	—
1978–79	Chicago Blackhawks	NHL	14	0	5	5	16	4	0	1	1	0
1979–80	Chicago Blackhawks	NHL	71	4	11	15	73	7	0	0	0	8
1980–81	Chicago Blackhawks	NHL	75	3	16	19	112	3	0	1	1	2
1981–82	Chicago Blackhawks	NHL	79	2	19	21	137	15	1	3	4	27
1982–83	Chicago Blackhawks	NHL	76	0	13	13	81	13	0	3	3	22
1983–84	Chicago Blackhawks	NHL	24	0	5	5	31	—	—	—	—	—
1983–84	Pittsburgh Penguins	NHL	49	2	5	7	66	—	—	—	—	—
1984–85	Baltimore Skipjacks	AHL	36	3	14	17	38	15	1	4	5	14
1984–85	Pittsburgh Penguins	NHL	26	2	5	7	26	—	—	—	—	—
NHL totals			494	14	93	107	637	44	1	9	10	67
