= 1981–82 New York Rangers season =

National Hockey League team season

1981–82 New York Rangers
- Division: 2nd Patrick
- Conference: 5th Wales
- 1981–82 record: 39–27–14
- Home record: 19–15–6
- Road record: 20–12–8
- Goals for: 316
- Goals against: 306

Team information
- General manager: Craig Patrick
- Coach: Herb Brooks
- Captain: Barry Beck
- Alternate captains: None
- Arena: Madison Square Garden
- Average attendance: 17,399

Team leaders
- Goals: Ron Duguay (40)
- Assists: Mike Rogers (65)
- Points: Mike Rogers (103)
- Penalty minutes: Ed Hospodar (152)
- Wins: Steve Weeks (23)
- Goals against average: John Davidson/John Vanbiesbrouck (1.00)

The 1981–82 New York Rangers season was the franchise's 56th season. During the regular season, the Rangers finished second in the Patrick Division with 92 points and qualified for the NHL playoffs. In the first round of the playoffs, New York defeated the Philadelphia Flyers, three games to one, to advance to the Patrick Division Finals. There, the Rangers lost to the New York Islanders in six games.

== Final standings ==
Patrick Division
	GP	W	L	T	GF	GA	PTS
**New York Islanders**	80	54	16	10	385	250	118
**New York Rangers**	80	39	27	14	316	306	92
**Philadelphia Flyers**	80	38	31	11	325	313	87
**Pittsburgh Penguins**	80	31	36	13	310	337	75
Washington Capitals	80	26	41	13	319	338	65

Note: GP = Games played, W = Wins, L = Losses, T = Ties, Pts = Points, GF = Goals for, GA = Goals against
Note: Teams that qualified for the playoffs are highlighted in bold.

=== Record vs. opponents ===
Patrick Division record vs. opponents

==== Vs. Wales Conference ====
**Vs. Patrick Division**

1981–82 NHL records
Team	**NYI**	**NYR**	**PHI**	**PIT**	**WSH**	**Total**
N.Y. Islanders	—	6−2	6−1−1	6−2	7−0−1	**25−5−2**
N.Y. Rangers	2−6	—	4−2−2	4−3−1	3−2−3	**13−13−6**
Philadelphia	1−6−1	2−4−2	—	5−2−1	3−4−1	**11−16−5**
Pittsburgh	2−6	3−4−1	2–5–1	—	5−2−1	**12−17−3**
Washington	0−7−1	2−3−3	4–3–1	2–5–1	—	**8−18−6**

**Vs. Adams Division**

1981–82 NHL records
Team	**BOS**	**BUF**	**HFD**	**MTL**	**QUE**	**Total**
N.Y. Islanders	1−2	1−2	2−0−1	2−1	1−1−1	**7−6−2**
N.Y. Rangers	1−2	2−0−1	1−1−1	1−2	1−1−1	**6−6−3**
Philadelphia	2−1	2−1	3−0	1−2	1−1−1	**9−5−1**
Pittsburgh	1−1−1	1−2	2−0−1	1−2	3−0	**8−5−2**
Washington	0−3	0−3	2−1	2−1	0−2−1	**4−10−1**

==== Vs. Campbell Conference ====
**Vs. Norris Division**

1981–82 NHL records
Team	**CHI**	**DET**	**MIN**	**STL**	**TOR**	**WIN**	**Total**
N.Y. Islanders	3−0	3−0	2−0−1	2−0−1	3−0	2−1	**15−1−2**
N.Y. Rangers	3−0	2−1	2−1	2−0−1	1−1−1	1−1−1	**11−4−3**
Philadelphia	1−1−1	2−0−1	1−1−1	3−0	2−1	1−2	**10−5−3**
Pittsburgh	0−1−2	1−2	1−2	1−2	0−1−2	2−1	**5−9−4**
Washington	1−2	1−0−2	0−2−1	2−1	2−1	2−1	**8−7−3**

**Vs. Smythe Division**

1981–82 NHL records
Team	**CGY**	**COL**	**EDM**	**LAK**	**VAN**	**Total**
N.Y. Islanders	1−0−2	2−0−1	1−1−1	1−2	2−1	**7−4−4**
N.Y. Rangers	2−0−1	2−0−1	0−3	2−1	3−0	**9−4−2**
Philadelphia	3−0	2−1	1−2	2−0−1	0−2−1	**8−5−2**
Pittsburgh	0−1−2	3−0	0−3	1−1−1	2−0−1	**6−5−4**
Washington	3−0	1−2	0−2−1	1−1−1	1−1−1	**6−6−3**

== Schedule and results ==
1981–82 regular season
October: 3–8–0 (home: 2–4–0; road: 1–4–0)

Game	October	Opponent	Score	Record
1	6	Detroit Red Wings	5–2	0–1–0
2	9	@ Winnipeg Jets	8–3	0–2–0
3	10	@ Minnesota North Stars	7–0	0–3–0
4	14	Vancouver Canucks	2–1	1–3–0
5	17	@ New York Islanders	5–4	1–4–0
6	18	St. Louis Blues	5–3	2–4–0
7	21	Los Angeles Kings	5–2	2–5–0
8	24	@ Toronto Maple Leafs	5–3	3–5–0
9	25	Montreal Canadiens	4–2	3–6–0
10	28	Edmonton Oilers	5–3	3–7–0
11	31	@ Boston Bruins	7–3	3–8–0

November: 5–5–3 (home: 3–2–2; road: 2–3–1)

Game	November	Opponent	Score	Record
12	1	Calgary Flames	4–2	4–8–0
13	4	@ Pittsburgh Penguins	6–3	4–9–0
14	5	@ Philadelphia Flyers	6–2	5–9–0
15	7	@ Washington Capitals	3–1	6–9–0
16	11	Buffalo Sabres	7–3	7–9–0
17	13	@ Buffalo Sabres	3–3	7–9–1
18	15	Edmonton Oilers	5–3	7–10–1
19	18	Philadelphia Flyers	5–2	8–10–1
20	21	@ New York Islanders	4–3	8–11–1
21	22	New York Islanders	7–2	8–12–1
22	25	Toronto Maple Leafs	3–3	8–12–2
23	28	@ Quebec Nordiques	7–4	8–13–2
24	29	Quebec Nordiques	4–4	8–13–3

December: 7–4–2 (home: 4–4–0; road: 3–0–2)

Game	December	Opponent	Score	Record
25	2	@ Los Angeles Kings	4–3	9–13–3
26	5	@ Colorado Rockies	2–1	10–13–3
27	6	Hartford Whalers	5–3	10–14–3
28	9	Boston Bruins	4–3	10–15–3
29	12	@ Philadelphia Flyers	5–3	11–15–3
30	14	Pittsburgh Penguins	5–4	12–15–3
31	16	Philadelphia Flyers	7–3	12–16–3
32	19	@ Pittsburgh Penguins	3–3	12–16–4
33	20	Washington Capitals	3–2	12–17–4
34	23	Winnipeg Jets	5–2	13–17–4
35	26	@ Washington Capitals	4–4	13–17–5
36	27	Pittsburgh Penguins	5–3	14–17–5
37	30	New York Islanders	6–4	15–17–5

January: 9–3–2 (home: 4–1–1; road: 5–2–1)

Game	January	Opponent	Score	Record
38	2	@ Montreal Canadiens	6–5	16–17–5
39	3	Washington Capitals	4–3	16–18–5
40	7	Vancouver Canucks	4–1	17–18–5
41	9	Chicago Black Hawks	7–5	18–18–5
42	11	Minnesota North Stars	5–3	19–18–5
43	13	@ Minnesota North Stars	2–0	20–18–5
44	15	@ Winnipeg Jets	4–4	20–18–6
45	18	@ Toronto Maple Leafs	6–2	20–19–6
46	20	New York Islanders	3–2	21–19–6
47	23	@ New York Islanders	6–1	21–20–6
48	24	Washington Capitals	4–4	21–20–7
49	27	@ Washington Capitals	5–4	22–20–7
50	29	@ Colorado Rockies	5–2	23–20–7
51	31	@ Los Angeles Kings	6–3	24–20–7

February: 6–3–3 (home: 2–2–1; road: 4–1–2)

Game	February	Opponent	Score	Record
52	2	@ Vancouver Canucks	4–3	25–20–7
53	4	@ Calgary Flames	4–4	25–20–8
54	7	@ Edmonton Oilers	8–4	25–21–8
55	10	@ St. Louis Blues	3–3	25–21–9
56	13	@ Hartford Whalers	3–2	26–21–9
57	14	Quebec Nordiques	5–2	27–21–9
58	17	@ Pittsburgh Penguins	5–3	28–21–9
59	18	Colorado Rockies	4–4	28–21–10
60	21	Montreal Canadiens	4–2	28–22–10
61	24	Chicago Black Hawks	6–4	29–22–10
62	27	@ Boston Bruins	6–4	30–22–10
63	28	Pittsburgh Penguins	4–2	30–23–10

March: 9–3–3 (home: 4–1–2; road: 5–2–1)

Game	March	Opponent	Score	Record
64	3	Calgary Flames	4–2	31–23–10
65	4	@ Philadelphia Flyers	4–4	31–23–11
66	6	@ New York Islanders	6–4	31–24–11
67	8	Detroit Red Wings	6–3	32–24–11
68	10	Philadelphia Flyers	5–5	32–24–12
69	11	@ Detroit Red Wings	4–1	33–24–12
70	14	Washington Capitals	5–5	33–24–13
71	17	Philadelphia Flyers	5–2	34–24–13
72	20	@ Washington Capitals	4–3	35–24–13
73	21	St. Louis Blues	8–5	36–24–13
74	24	@ Pittsburgh Penguins	7–2	37–24–13
75	26	@ Buffalo Sabres	8–5	38–24–13
76	28	@ Philadelphia Flyers	3–1	38–25–13
77	29	New York Islanders	7–3	38–26–13
78	31	@ Chicago Black Hawks	4–1	39–26–13

April: 0–1–1 (home: 0–1–0; road: 0–0–1)

Game	April	Opponent	Score	Record
79	2	Pittsburgh Penguins	7–5	39–27–13
80	3	@ Hartford Whalers	3–3	39–27–14

Legend: Win (2 points) Loss (0 points) Tie (1 point)

== Playoffs ==
Key: Win Loss

1982 Stanley Cup playoffs
Division semifinals vs. (P3) Philadelphia Flyers – Rangers win 3–1

Game	Date	Visitor	Score	Home	OT	Series
1	April 7	Philadelphia Flyers	4–1	New York Rangers		Philadelphia leads series 1–0
2	April 8	Philadelphia Flyers	3–7	New York Rangers		Series tied 1–1
3	April 10	New York Rangers	4–3	Philadelphia Flyers		New York Rangers lead series 2–1
4	April 11	New York Rangers	7–5	Philadelphia Flyers		New York Rangers win series 3–1

Division Division vs. (P1) New York Islanders – Islanders win 4–2

Game	Date	Visitor	Score	Home	OT	Series
1	April 15	New York Rangers	5–4	New York Islanders		New York Rangers lead series 1–0
2	April 16	New York Rangers	2–7	New York Islanders		Series tied 1–1
3	April 18	New York Islanders	4–3	New York Rangers	OT	New York Islanders lead series 2–1
4	April 19	New York Islanders	5–3	New York Rangers		New York Islanders lead series 3–1
5	April 21	New York Rangers	4–2	New York Islanders		New York Islanders lead series 3–2
6	April 23	New York Islanders	5–3	New York Rangers		New York Islanders win series 4–2

Legend: Win Loss

== Player statistics ==
Skaters

Regular season
Player	GP	G	A	Pts	+/-	PIM
Mike Rogers	80	38	65	103	2	43
Ron Duguay	72	40	36	76	18	82
Mark Pavelich	79	33	43	76	21	67
Ed Johnstone	68	30	28	58	−5	57
Don Maloney	54	22	36	58	9	73
Reijo Ruotsalainen	78	18	38	56	18	27
Dave Maloney	64	13	36	49	2	105
Barry Beck	60	9	29	38	19	111
Dave Silk	64	15	20	35	17	39
Robbie Ftorek^{†}	30	8	24	32	8	24
Mikko Leinonen	53	11	20	31	2	18
Pat Hickey^{†‡}	53	15	14	29	−15	32
Mike Allison	48	7	15	22	−3	74
Tom Laidlaw	79	3	18	21	7	104
Steve Vickers	34	9	11	20	4	13
Andre Dore	56	4	16	20	10	64
Nick Fotiu	70	8	10	18	−7	151
Ron Greschner	29	5	11	16	−11	16
Rob McClanahan^{‡}	22	5	9	14	7	10
Dean Talafous	29	6	7	13	−3	8
Jere Gillis^{‡}	26	3	9	12	−2	16
Carol Vadnais	50	5	6	11	−2	45
Ed Hospodar	41	3	8	11	−8	152
Peter Wallin	40	2	9	11	1	12
Tom Younghans^{†}	47	3	5	8	0	17
Tim Bothwell	13	0	3	3	−5	10
Steve Weeks	49	0	3	3	0	0
Mark Morrison	9	1	1	2	−5	0
Mike Backman	3	0	2	2	7	4
Anders Hedberg	4	0	1	1	−2	0
Lance Nethery^{‡}	5	0	0	0	−1	0

Playoffs
Player	GP	G	A	Pts	PIM
Robbie Ftorek	10	7	4	11	11
Don Maloney	10	5	5	10	10
Reijo Ruotsalainen	10	4	5	9	2
Ed Johnstone	10	2	6	8	25
Rob McClanahan	10	2	5	7	2
Mikko Leinonen	7	1	6	7	20
Mike Rogers	9	1	6	7	2
Dave Silk	9	2	4	6	4
Barry Beck	10	1	5	6	14
Mark Pavelich	6	1	5	6	0
Ron Duguay	10	5	1	6	31
Dave Maloney	10	1	4	5	6
Cam Connor	10	4	0	4	16
Mike Allison	10	1	3	4	18
Tom Laidlaw	10	0	3	3	14
Nick Fotiu	10	0	2	2	6
Andre Dore	10	1	1	2	16
Carol Vadnais	10	1	0	1	4
Gary Burns	4	0	0	0	4
Claude Larose	2	0	0	0	0
Mike Backman	1	0	0	0	2
Tom Younghans	2	0	0	0	0

Goaltenders

Regular season
Player	GP	TOI	W	L	T	GA	GAA	SA	SV%	SO
Steve Weeks	49	2852	23	16	9	179	3.77	1345	.867	1
Eddie Mio	25	1500	13	6	5	89	3.56	767	.884	0
Steve Baker	6	328	1	5	0	33	6.04	163	.798	0
John Davidson	1	60	1	0	0	1	1.00	29	.966	0
John Vanbiesbrouck	1	60	1	0	0	1	1.00	30	.967	0

Playoffs
Player	GP	TOI	W	L	GA	GAA	SO
Eddie Mio	8	443	4	3	28	3.79	0
Steve Weeks	4	127	1	2	9	4.25	0
John Davidson	1	33	0	0	3	5.45	0

^{†}Denotes player spent time with another team before joining Rangers. Stats reflect time with Rangers only.
^{‡}Traded mid-season. Stats reflect time with Rangers only.

Note:

Pos = Position;GP = Games played; G = Goals; A = Assists; Pts = Points; PIM = Penalty minutes; +/- = Plus/minus; PPG = Power-play goals; SHG = Short-handed goals; GWG = Game-winning goals
Pos = Position;GP = Games played; Min, TOI = Minutes played; W = Wins; L = Losses; T,T/OT = Ties; OTL = Overtime losses; GA = Goals-against; GAA = Goals-against average; SO = Shutouts; SA = Shots against; SV = Shots saved;SV% = Save percentage;

== Transactions ==
- September 8, 1981 – Rangers trade Doug Soetaert to the Winnipeg Jets for a 1983 3rd round pick.
- October 2, 1981 – Rangers acquire Mike Rogers from the Hartford Whalers for Chris Kotsopoulos, Doug Sulliman, and Gerry McDonald.
- October 16, 1981 – Rangers acquire Pat Hickey from the Toronto Maple Leafs for a 1982 5th round pick.
- October 30, 1981 – Rangers acquire the rights to Tom Younghans from the Minnesota North Stars for cash.
- December 11, 1981 – Rangers acquire Eddie Mio from the Edmonton Oilers for Lance Nethery.
- December 30, 1981 – Rangers acquire Robbie Ftorek and a 1982 8th round pick from the Quebec Nordiques for Jere Gillis and Dean Talafous. Talafous, however, did not report to the Nordiques and an arbitrator awarded Pat Hickey to the Nordiques on March 8, 1982.
- February 2, 1982 – Rangers acquire Rob McClanahan from the Hartford Whalers for a 1982 10th round pick.

== Draft picks ==
New York's picks at the 1981 NHL entry draft in Montreal, Canada at the Montreal Forum.

Round	#	Player	Position	Nationality	College/Junior/Club team (League)
1	9	James Patrick	D	Canada	Prince Albert Raiders (SJHL)
2	30	Jan Erixon	LW	Sweden	Skelleftea AIK (Elitserien)
3	50	Peter Sundstrom	LW	Sweden	Bjorkloven (Elitserien)
3	51	Mark Morrison	C	Canada	Victoria Cougars (WHL)
4	72	John Vanbiesbrouck	G	United States	Sault Ste. Marie Greyhounds (OHL)
6	114	Eric Magnuson	C	United States	R.P.I. (NCAA)
7	135	Mike Guentzel	D	United States	Greenway (Minn H.S.)
8	156	Ari Lahteenmaki	RW	Finland	HIFK (FNL)
9	177	Paul Reifenberger	C	United States	Anoka High School (Minnesota)
10	198	Mario Proulx	G	Canada	Providence College (NCAA)
