= 1981–82 Quebec Nordiques season =

3rd Nordiques season in the National Hockey League

1981–82 Quebec Nordiques
- Division: 4th Adams
- Conference: 7th Wales
- 1981–82 record: 33–31–16
- Home record: 24–13–3
- Road record: 9–18–13
- Goals for: 356
- Goals against: 345

Team information
- General manager: Maurice Filion
- Coach: Michel Bergeron
- Captain: Robbie Ftorek (Oct.–Dec.); Andre Dupont (Dec.–May)
- Alternate captains: None
- Arena: Colisée de Québec

Team leaders
- Goals: Peter Stastny (46)
- Assists: Peter Stastny (93)
- Points: Peter Stastny (139)
- Penalty minutes: Dale Hunter (272)
- Plus/minus: Michel Goulet (+35)
- Wins: Dan Bouchard (27)
- Goals against average: Dan Bouchard (3.86)

The 1981–82 Quebec Nordiques season was the Nordiques' third season in the National Hockey League (NHL). The Nordiques had a successful regular season, qualifying for the playoffs, but they had a better playoff, making it to the Wales Final before losing to the eventual Stanley Cup champion New York Islanders.

== Off-season ==
During the off-season, the four divisions of the NHL were re-aligned to better reflect the geographical locations of the teams. Quebec remained in the Adams Division with the Boston Bruins and Buffalo Sabres, while the Minnesota North Stars and Toronto Maple Leafs were replaced with the Hartford Whalers and the Nordiques' provincial rival, the Montreal Canadiens. The Nordiques signed Marian Stastny out of Czechoslovakia, the brother of Peter Stastny and Anton Stastny. Quebec replaced team captain Marc Tardif with Robbie Ftorek prior to the season. Ftorek did not remain the Nordiques captain for long, as he was traded to the New York Rangers in December, and was replaced with Andre Dupont.

== Regular season ==
Adams Division teams

The Nordiques found themselves under .500 only once throughout the season, and that was five games in when they had a record of 2–3–0. Quebec got hot, and eventually reached a season-high nine games over .500 in the middle of January, however, a late season slump had the Nords finish the year only two games above .500, with a 33-31-16 record, earning 82 points, which was good enough to finish fourth in the Adams Division, and the Nordiques second post-season appearance in a row.

Offensively, the Nordiques were led by Peter Stastny, who set a team record with 139 points, as he scored 46 goals and earned 93 assists. Stastny finished behind only Wayne Gretzky of the Edmonton Oilers and Mike Bossy of the New York Islanders in the NHL scoring race. Real Cloutier rebounded from an injury plagued 1980–81 season by scoring 37 goals and 97 points, while rookie Marian Stastny scored 35 goals and 89 points. Michel Goulet notched 42 goals and 84 points, while Dale Hunter had a breakout season, scoring 22 goals and 72 points, as well as a team record 272 penalty minutes. On defence, Mario Marois led the way, scoring 11 goals and 43 points.

In goal, Dan Bouchard held on to the number one job, winning a team record 27 games, while posting a team best 3.86 GAA, as well as earning a shutout in 60 games.

=== Season standings ===
Adams Division
	GP	W	L	T	GF	GA	PIM	PTS
**Montreal Canadiens**	80	46	17	17	360	223	1463	109
**Boston Bruins**	80	43	27	10	323	285	1266	96
**Buffalo Sabres**	80	39	26	15	307	273	1425	93
**Quebec Nordiques**	80	33	31	16	356	345	1757	82
Hartford Whalers	80	21	41	18	264	351	1493	60

Note: GP = Games played, W = Wins, L = Losses, T = Ties, Pts = Points, GF = Goals for, GA = Goals against
Note: Teams that qualified for the playoffs are highlighted in bold.

=== Record vs. opponents ===
Adams Division record vs. opponents

==== Vs. Wales Conference ====
**Vs. Adams Division**

1981–82 NHL records
Team	**BOS**	**BUF**	**HFD**	**MTL**	**QUE**	**Total**
Boston	—	5–2–1	4–2–2	0–7–1	4–4	**13–15–4**
Buffalo	2–5–1	—	4–1–3	3–2–3	4–3–1	**13–11–8**
Hartford	2–4–2	1–4–3	—	0–7–1	2–3–3	**5–18–9**
Montreal	7–0–1	2–3–3	7–0–1	—	3–3–2	**19–6–7**
Quebec	4–4	3–4–1	3–2–3	3–3–2	—	**13–13–6**

**Vs. Patrick Division**

1981–82 NHL records
Team	**NYI**	**NYR**	**PHI**	**PIT**	**WSH**	**Total**
Boston	2–1	2–1	1–2	1–1–1	3–0	**9–5–1**
Buffalo	2–1	0–2–1	1–2	2–1	3–0	**8–6–1**
Hartford	0–2–1	1–1–1	0−3	0–2–1	1–2	**2–10–3**
Montreal	1–2	2–1	2–1	2–1	1–2	**8–7–0**
Quebec	1–1–1	1–1–1	1–1–1	0–3	2–0–1	**5–6–4**

==== Vs. Campbell Conference ====
**Vs. Norris Division**

1981–82 NHL records
Team	**CHI**	**DET**	**MIN**	**STL**	**TOR**	**WIN**	**Total**
Boston	1−2	2−0−1	1−2	1−1–1	3−0	3−0	**11−5−2**
Buffalo	2−1	3−0	1−1−1	2−1	2−0−1	1−0−2	**11−3−4**
Hartford	1–1–1	2–0–1	1–2	2–1	3–0	2−1	**11−5−2**
Montreal	2−0−1	2−1	1–0−2	2−0−1	2–0−1	1−0−2	**10−1−7**
Quebec	2−1	3−0	0−2–1	2−1	1−1–1	2−0−1	**10−5−3**

**Vs. Smythe Division**

1981–82 NHL records
Team	**CGY**	**COL**	**EDM**	**LAK**	**VAN**	**Total**
Boston	1−1−1	3−0	1−0–2	3−0	2−1	**10−2−3**
Buffalo	0−2−1	3–0	1−2	2−1	1−1−1	**7−6−2**
Hartford	1–2	0–2–1	0–2–1	2–0–1	0–2–1	**3–8–4**
Montreal	2−1	2−0−1	1−0−2	2–1	2−1	**9−3−3**
Quebec	0−3	2−1	2−1	0–1–2	1–1−1	**5−7−3**

== Schedule and results ==
1981–82 regular season
October

Game	Date	Visitor	Score	Home	Record	Points	Attendance
1	October 6	Hartford Whalers	5–6	Quebec Nordiques	1–0–0	2	15,007
2	October 8	Quebec Nordiques	7–5	Boston Bruins	2–0–0	4	11,274
3	October 10	Quebec Nordiques	1–2	Pittsburgh Penguins	2–1–0	4	15,215
4	October 12	Minnesota North Stars	4–2	Quebec Nordiques	2–2–0	4	15,211
5	October 14	Quebec Nordiques	2–4	Buffalo Sabres	2–3–0	4	14,764
6	October 17	Toronto Maple Leafs	4–6	Quebec Nordiques	3–3–0	6	15,019
7	October 19	Vancouver Canucks	3–6	Quebec Nordiques	4-3–0	8	14,443
8	October 21	Quebec Nordiques	6–3	Washington Capitals	5–3–0	10	7,862
9	October 22	Quebec Nordiques	2–3	Philadelphia Flyers	5–4–0	10	16,948
10	October 24	Detroit Red Wings	3–8	Quebec Nordiques	6–4–0	12	15,212
11	October 27	Quebec Nordiques	7–8	Los Angeles Kings	6–5–0	12	7,595
12	October 28	Quebec Nordiques	3–1	Colorado Rockies	7–5–0	14	N/A
13	October 31	Quebec Nordiques	4–11	Edmonton Oilers	7–6–0	14	17,490

November

Game	Date	Visitor	Score	Home	Record	Points	Attendance
14	November 2	Montreal Canadiens	4–5	Quebec Nordiques	8–6–0	16	15,262
15	November 4	St. Louis Blues	2–6	Quebec Nordiques	9–6–0	18	15,005
16	November 7	Boston Bruins	10–1	Quebec Nordiques	9–7–0	18	15,232
17	November 9	Detroit Red Wings	3–5	Quebec Nordiques	10–7–0	20	15,043
18	November 11	Quebec Nordiques	5–6	Vancouver Canucks	10–8–0	20	12,558
19	November 12	Quebec Nordiques	2–3	Calgary Flames	10–9–0	20	7,226
20	November 14	Quebec Nordiques	5–5	Minnesota North Stars	10–9–1	21	15,784
21	November 17	New York Islanders	2–7	Quebec Nordiques	11–9–1	23	15,148
22	November 19	Quebec Nordiques	1–1	Montreal Canadiens	11–9–2	24	17,088
23	November 21	Hartford Whalers	3–7	Quebec Nordiques	12–9–2	26	15,016
24	November 22	Quebec Nordiques	6–1	Boston Bruins	13–9–2	28	10,024
25	November 24	Pittsburgh Penguins	7–1	Quebec Nordiques	13–10-2	28	14,805
26	November 25	Quebec Nordiques	3–3	Hartford Whalers	13–10–3	29	12,141
27	November 28	New York Rangers	4–7	Quebec Nordiques	14–10–3	31	15,229
28	November 29	Quebec Nordiques	4–4	New York Rangers	14–10–4	32	17,423

December

Game	Date	Visitor	Score	Home	Record	Points	Attendance
29	December 2	Edmonton Oilers	8–9	Quebec Nordiques	15–10–4	34	15,230
30	December 5	Boston Bruins	5–3	Quebec Nordiques	15–11–4	34	15,228
31	December 8	Calgary Flames	7–4	Quebec Nordiques	15–12–4	34	14,951
32	December 12	St. Louis Blues	6–4	Quebec Nordiques	15–13–4	34	15,204
33	December 13	Quebec Nordiques	4–4	Buffalo Sabres	15–13–5	35	15,708
34	December 15	Quebec Nordiques	7–10	New York Islanders	15–14–5	35	14,746
35	December 17	Quebec Nordiques	3–2	Detroit Red Wings	16–14–5	37	11,302
36	December 19	Buffalo Sabres	3–7	Quebec Nordiques	17–14–5	39	15,219
37	December 22	Montreal Canadiens	2–5	Quebec Nordiques	18–14–5	41	15,259
38	December 27	Quebec Nordiques	3–6	Montreal Canadiens	18–15–5	41	18,096
39	December 29	Chicago Black Hawks	1–8	Quebec Nordiques	19–15–5	43	15,227

January

Game	Date	Visitor	Score	Home	Record	Points	Attendance
40	January 2	Buffalo Sabres	3–6	Quebec Nordiques	20–15–5	45	15,221
41	January 5	Washington Capitals	0–3	Quebec Nordiques	21–15–5	47	15,143
42	January 9	Boston Bruins	1–6	Quebec Nordiques	22–15–5	49	15,217
43	January 11	Hartford Whalers	2–6	Quebec Nordiques	23–15–5	51	15,216
44	January 13	Quebec Nordiques	4–2	St. Louis Blues	24–15–5	53	12,530
45	January 16	Quebec Nordiques	1–4	Minnesota North Stars	24–16–5	53	15,516
46	January 17	Quebec Nordiques	7–5	Winnipeg Jets	25-16–5	55	14,061
47	January 19	Philadelphia Flyers	2–2	Quebec Nordiques	25–16–6	56	15,208
48	January 20	Quebec Nordiques	2–4	Hartford Whalers	25–17–6	56	11,197
49	January 22	Quebec Nordiques	3–5	Buffalo Sabres	25–18–6	56	16,433
50	January 23	Buffalo Sabres	3–2	Quebec Nordiques	25–19–6	56	N/A
51	January 26	Montreal Canadiens	8–3	Quebec Nordiques	25–20–6	56	15,338
52	January 30	Quebec Nordiques	2–2	Toronto Maple Leafs	25–20–7	57	16,360
53	January 31	Quebec Nordiques	4–4	Hartford Whalers	25–20–8	58	11,769

February

Game	Date	Visitor	Score	Home	Record	Points	Attendance
54	February 2	Colorado Rockies	7–8	Quebec Nordiques	26–20–8	60	15,177
55	February 6	Philadelphia Flyers	3-4	Quebec Nordiques	27–20–8	62	15,303
56	February 7	Quebec Nordiques	5–5	Washington Capitals	27–20–9	63	10,712
57	February 11	Quebec Nordiques	4–4	Los Angeles Kings	27–20–10	64	9,958
58	February 12	Quebec Nordiques	2–9	Colorado Rockies	27–21–10	64	7,129
59	February 14	Quebec Nordiques	2–5	New York Rangers	27–22–10	64	17,398
60	February 16	Winnipeg Jets	3–7	Quebec Nordiques	28–22–10	66	15,265
61	February 19	Quebec Nordiques	4–4	Winnipeg Jets	28–22–11	67	13,661
62	February 21	Quebec Nordiques	3–5	Chicago Black Hawks	28–23–11	67	12,563
63	February 23	Montreal Canadiens	3–4	Quebec Nordiques	29–23–11	69	15,330
64	February 25	Quebec Nordiques	4-4	Montreal Canadiens	29–23–12	70	16,969
65	February 27	Quebec Nordiques	5–5	New York Islanders	29–23–13	71	15,271

March

Game	Date	Visitor	Score	Home	Record	Points	Attendance
66	March 1	Los Angeles Kings	5–5	Quebec Nordiques	29–23-14	72	15,288
67	March 3	Edmonton Oilers	4–6	Quebec Nordiques	30–23–14	74	15,290
68	March 6	Pittsburgh Penguins	6–4	Quebec Nordiques	30–24–14	74	15,222
69	March 9	Calgary Flames	9–4	Quebec Nordiques	30–25–14	74	15,189
70	March 13	Chicago Black Hawks	3–9	Quebec Nordiques	31–25–14	76	15,288
71	March 16	Hartford Whalers	7-5	Quebec Nordiques	31–26-14	76	15,285
72	March 17	Quebec Nordiques	3–6	Toronto Maple Leafs	31–27–14	76	16,360
73	March 20	Vancouver Canucks	3–3	Quebec Nordiques	31–27–15	77	15,289
74	March 22	Quebec Nordiques	4–5	Boston Bruins	31–28–15	77	10,851
75	March 24	Quebec Nordiques	3–3	Hartford Whalers	31–28–16	78	10,509
76	March 27	Quebec Nordiques	2–4	Montreal Canadiens	31–29–16	78	18,175
77	March 30	Buffalo Sabres	6–4	Quebec Nordiques	31–30–16	78	15,201

April

Game	Date	Visitor	Score	Home	Record	Points	Attendance
78	April 1	Quebec Nordiques	8–5	Boston Bruins	32–30–16	80	11,407
79	April 3	Boston Bruins	5–4	Quebec Nordiques	32–31–16	80	15,276
80	April 4	Quebec Nordiques	7–4	Buffalo Sabres	33–31–16	82	16,433

Legend: Win (2 points) Loss (0 points) Tie (1 point)

== Playoffs ==
The Nordiques opened the 1982 Stanley Cup playoffs with a best of five Adams Division semi-final series with their Battle of Quebec rivals, the Montreal Canadiens. Montreal finished the season on top of the Adams Division with a 46-17-17 record, earning 109 points, which was 27 more than the Nordiques.

The series opened with two games at the Montreal Forum, and the Canadiens handled the Nordiques easily in the first game, as Mario Tremblay and Mark Napier each scored twice for Montreal, leading them to a 5–1 victory. The Nordiques fought back in the second game, as goaltender Dan Bouchard made 33 saves as Quebec defeated Montreal 3–2 to even the series up. The series shifted to Le Colisée for the next two games, and in the third game of the series, the Nordiques were led by Dale Hunter and his two goals late in the first period, as well as another spectacular goaltending performance by Dan Bouchard, who made 22 saves, as the Nordiques edged the Canadiens 2–1 to take the series lead. Montreal fought back in the fourth game, which featured a brawl in which every player from both teams was involved. The brawl lasted for twenty minutes. There were 149 penalty minutes, and two game misconducts. The Canadiens easily defeated the underdog Nordiques 6–2 to even the series up at two games each, with the fifth and deciding game back at the Montreal Forum. In the fifth game, the Nordiques took an early 2–0 lead with first period goals by Wilf Paiement and Anton Stastny, however, the Canadiens tied the game in the third period, setting up overtime. In the extra period, Dale Hunter emerged as the hero, scoring 22 seconds into the period against Montreal goalie Rick Wamsley to clinch the series for the Nordiques, who then moved on to the Adams Division finals.

Quebec would face the Boston Bruins in the best of seven Adams Division finals. Boston had a 43-27-10 record, earning 96 points, and a second-place finish in the division. The Bruins defeated the Buffalo Sabres in four games in their first playoff round. The series opened with two games at the Boston Garden. In the first game, the Nordiques and Bruins were tied up at three heading into the final minute of the third period, however, Ray Bourque scored for Boston, as the Bruins won the game 4–3. In the second game, the Bruins easily defeated Quebec by a score of 8–4, taking a commanding 2–0 series lead. The series moved to Le Colisée for the next two games, and the Nordiques responded on their home ice, as Wilf Paiement scored the overtime winner in the third game for a 3-2 Quebec victory, cutting the Bruins series lead to 2–1. In the fourth game, the Nordiques, led by Michel Goulet and his two goals, as well as 33 saves by goaltender John Garrett, easily defeated the Bruins 7–2 to even up the series. The fifth game was back in Boston, however, the Nordiques, led by Peter Stastny and his two goals, shocked the Bruins with a 4–3 win to push Boston on the brink of elimination. In the sixth game back in Quebec City, the Bruins stormed out to an early 3–0 lead, however, the Nordiques fought back, and tied the game at five in the third period, setting up overtime. In overtime, the Bruins Peter McNab scored, as the Bruins tied the series, setting up a seventh and deciding game back in Boston. After a scoreless first period, the Nordiques Michel Goulet opened the scoring in the second period, however, Peter McNab of the Bruins tied the game. In the third period, Nordiques defenseman Dave Pichette scored on the powerplay, giving Quebec a 2–1 lead. The Bruins couldn't beat Nordiques goaltender Dan Bouchard, who made 28 saves in the game, as the Nordiques held on for the 2–1 win, and completing the series upset, advancing to the Wales Conference finals.

The Nordiques opponent in the Wales Conference finals was the two time defending Stanley Cup champions, the New York Islanders. The best of seven series opened with two games at Nassau Veterans Memorial Coliseum on Long Island, New York. The powerful Islanders, led by 27 saves by goaltender Billy Smith, defeated Quebec 4–1 in the series opener. In the second game, the Islanders were led by two goals by Mike Bossy, and another solid performance by Billy Smith, who made 35 saves, as New York defeated Quebec 5–2 to take a 2–0 series lead. In the third game back in Quebec, the Nordiques took the Islanders to overtime, however, New York's Wayne Merrick emerged the hero, as he scored late in the first overtime, giving the Islanders a 5–4 victory, and 3–0 series lead. New York completed the series sweep in the fourth game, as the Islanders took a 3–0 lead late into the third period. Quebec put up a fight, scoring twice to cut the Islanders lead to 3–2, however, Duane Sutter scored an empty net goal to give the Islanders a 4–2 victory.

1982 Stanley Cup playoffs
Adams Division Semifinals vs. (A1) Montreal Canadiens – Nordiques win 3–2

Game	Date	Visitor	Score	Home	Series	Attendance
1	April 7	Quebec Nordiques	1–5	Montreal Canadiens	0-1	16,096
2	April 8	Quebec Nordiques	3–2	Montreal Canadiens	1-1	16,391
3	April 10	Montreal Canadiens	1–2	Quebec Nordiques	2-1	15,323
4	April 11	Montreal Canadiens	6–2	Quebec Nordiques	2-2	15,314
5	April 13	Quebec Nordiques	3–2 (OT)	Montreal Canadiens	3-2	17,611

Adams Division Semifinals vs. (A2) Boston Bruins – Nordiques win 4–3

Game	Date	Visitor	Score	Home	Series	Attendance
1	April 15	Quebec Nordiques	3–4	Boston Bruins	0-1	14,673
2	April 16	Quebec Nordiques	4–8	Boston Bruins	0-2	14,673
3	April 18	Boston Bruins	2–3	Quebec Nordiques	1-2	15,302
4	April 19	Boston Bruins	2–7	Quebec Nordiques	2-2	15,287
5	April 21	Quebec Nordiques	4–3	Boston Bruins	3-2	14,673
6	April 23	Boston Bruins	6–5	Quebec Nordiques	3-3	15,330
7	April 25	Quebec Nordiques	2–1	Boston Bruins	4-3	14,673

Wales Conference Finals vs. (P1) New York Islanders – Islanders win 4–0

Game	Date	Visitor	Score	Home	Series	Attendance
1	April 27	Quebec Nordiques	1–4	New York Islanders	0-1	15,137
2	April 29	Quebec Nordiques	2–5	New York Islanders	0-2	15,230
3	May 1	New York Islanders	5–4	Quebec Nordiques	0-3	15,238
4	May 3	New York Islanders	4–2	Quebec Nordiques	0-4	15,238

Legend: Win Loss

== Player statistics ==
=== Scoring leaders ===
Regular season
Player	GP	G	A	Pts	PIM
Peter Stastny	80	46	93	139	91
Real Cloutier	67	37	60	97	34
Marian Stastny	74	35	54	89	27
Michel Goulet	80	42	42	84	48
Dale Hunter	80	22	50	72	272

Playoffs
Player	GP	G	A	Pts	PIM
Peter Stastny	12	7	11	18	10
Marian Stastny	16	3	14	17	5
Anton Stastny	16	5	10	15	10
Michel Goulet	16	8	5	13	6
Real Cloutier	16	7	5	12	10

=== Goaltending ===
Regular season
Player	GP	Min	W	L	T	GA	SO	GAA
Dan Bouchard	60	3572	27	22	11	230	1	3.86
John Garrett	12	720	4	5	3	62	0	5.17
Michel Plasse	8	388	2	3	1	35	0	5.41
Clint Malarchuk	2	120	0	1	1	14	0	7.00

Playoffs
Player	GP	Min	W	L	GA	SO	GAA
Dan Bouchard	11	677	4	7	38	0	3.37
John Garrett	5	323	3	2	21	0	3.90

Note:

Pos = Position;GP = Games played; G = Goals; A = Assists; Pts = Points; PIM = Penalty minutes; +/- = Plus/minus; PPG = Power-play goals; SHG = Short-handed goals; GWG = Game-winning goals
Pos = Position;GP = Games played; Min, TOI = Minutes played; W = Wins; L = Losses; T,T/OT = Ties; OTL = Overtime losses; GA = Goals-against; GAA = Goals-against average; SO = Shutouts; SA = Shots against; SV = Shots saved;SV% = Save percentage;

== Transactions ==
The Nordiques were involved in the following transactions during the 1981–82 season.

=== Trades ===
December 30, 1981	To New York Rangers Robbie Ftorek; 8th round pick in 1982 – Brian Glynn	To Quebec Nordiques Jere Gillis; Pat Hickey
January 12, 1982	To Hartford Whalers Michel Plasse; 4th round pick in 1983 – Ron Chyzowski	To Quebec Nordiques John Garrett
February 1, 1982	To Washington Capitals Lee Norwood; 6th round pick in 1982 – Mats Kihlstrom	To Quebec Nordiques Tim Tookey; 7th round pick in 1982 – Daniel Poudrier
March 9, 1982	To Toronto Maple Leafs Miroslav Frycer; 7th round pick in 1982 – Jeff Triano	To Quebec Nordiques Wilf Paiement
June 9, 1982	To Minnesota North Stars 11th round pick in 1983 – Oldrich Valek	To Quebec Nordiques 12th round pick in 1982 – Jan Jasko

=== Free agents ===
Player	Former team
Pat Daley	Winnipeg Jets
Jean Hamel	Detroit Red Wings
Gary Dillon	Colorado Rockies

== Draft picks ==
Quebec's draft picks from the 1981 NHL entry draft which was held at the Montreal Forum in Montreal.

Round	#	Player	Nationality	College/junior/club team (league)
1	11	Randy Moller	Canada	Lethbridge Broncos (WHL)
3	53	Jean-Marc Gaulin	Canada	Sorel Black Hawks (QMJHL)
4	74	Clint Malarchuk	Canada	Portland Winter Hawks (WHL)
5	95	Ed Lee	United States	Princeton University (NCAA)
6	116	Mike Eagles	Canada	Kitchener Rangers (OHL)
8	158	Andre Cote	Canada	Quebec Remparts (QMJHL)
9	179	Marc Brisebois	Canada	Sorel Black Hawks (QMJHL)
10	200	Kari Takko	Finland	Assat Pori (Finland)
