= 1981–82 Philadelphia Flyers season =

NHL hockey team season

1981–82 Philadelphia Flyers
- Division: 3rd Patrick
- Conference: 6th Wales
- 1981–82 record: 38–31–11
- Home record: 25–10–5
- Road record: 13–21–6
- Goals for: 325 (8th)
- Goals against: 313 (9th)

Team information
- General manager: Keith Allen
- Coach: Pat Quinn (Oct.–Mar.); Bob McCammon (Mar.–Apr.)
- Captain: Bill Barber
- Alternate captains: None (Note: The alternate captain position was abolished from the 1975–76 season through the 1984–85 season.)
- Arena: Spectrum
- Average attendance: 17,044
- Minor league affiliates: Maine Mariners; Toledo Goaldiggers

Team leaders
- Goals: Bill Barber (45)
- Assists: Ken Linseman (68)
- Points: Ken Linseman (92)
- Penalty minutes: Glen Cochrane (329)
- Plus/minus: Bobby Clarke (+28)
- Wins: Pete Peeters (23)
- Goals against average: Pete Peeters (3.72)

The 1981–82 Philadelphia Flyers season was the franchise's 15th season in the National Hockey League (NHL). The Flyers lost in the Patrick Division semifinals to the New York Rangers in four games.

== Regular season ==
The Flyers were unable to reach a long-term contract with team captain Mel Bridgman for the second consecutive off-season. Prior to opening night head coach Pat Quinn replaced Bridgman as captain with Bill Barber. On November 11, Bridgman was traded to the Calgary Flames for defenseman Brad Marsh.

Darryl Sittler was acquired in January from Toronto.

After winning only six games in a span of 29 games, head coach Pat Quinn and assistant coach Bob Boucher were fired on March 19. Bobby Clarke was also relieved of his duties as an assistant coach. Replacing Quinn was Bob McCammon, who had been coaching the Maine Mariners ever since being replaced as Flyers coach by Quinn in 1979.

=== Season standings ===
Patrick Division
	GP	W	L	T	GF	GA	PTS
**New York Islanders**	80	54	16	10	385	250	118
**New York Rangers**	80	39	27	14	316	306	92
**Philadelphia Flyers**	80	38	31	11	325	313	87
**Pittsburgh Penguins**	80	31	36	13	310	337	75
Washington Capitals	80	26	41	13	319	338	65

Note: GP = Games played, W = Wins, L = Losses, T = Ties, Pts = Points, GF = Goals for, GA = Goals against
Note: Teams that qualified for the playoffs are highlighted in bold.

=== Record vs. opponents ===
Patrick Division record vs. opponents

==== Vs. Wales Conference ====
**Vs. Patrick Division**

1981–82 NHL records
Team	**NYI**	**NYR**	**PHI**	**PIT**	**WSH**	**Total**
N.Y. Islanders	—	6−2	6−1−1	6−2	7−0−1	**25−5−2**
N.Y. Rangers	2−6	—	4−2−2	4−3−1	3−2−3	**13−13−6**
Philadelphia	1−6−1	2−4−2	—	5−2−1	3−4−1	**11−16−5**
Pittsburgh	2−6	3−4−1	2–5–1	—	5−2−1	**12−17−3**
Washington	0−7−1	2−3−3	4–3–1	2–5–1	—	**8−18−6**

**Vs. Adams Division**

1981–82 NHL records
Team	**BOS**	**BUF**	**HFD**	**MTL**	**QUE**	**Total**
N.Y. Islanders	1−2	1−2	2−0−1	2−1	1−1−1	**7−6−2**
N.Y. Rangers	1−2	2−0−1	1−1−1	1−2	1−1−1	**6−6−3**
Philadelphia	2−1	2−1	3−0	1−2	1−1−1	**9−5−1**
Pittsburgh	1−1−1	1−2	2−0−1	1−2	3−0	**8−5−2**
Washington	0−3	0−3	2−1	2−1	0−2−1	**4−10−1**

==== Vs. Campbell Conference ====
**Vs. Norris Division**

1981–82 NHL records
Team	**CHI**	**DET**	**MIN**	**STL**	**TOR**	**WIN**	**Total**
N.Y. Islanders	3−0	3−0	2−0−1	2−0−1	3−0	2−1	**15−1−2**
N.Y. Rangers	3−0	2−1	2−1	2−0−1	1−1−1	1−1−1	**11−4−3**
Philadelphia	1−1−1	2−0−1	1−1−1	3−0	2−1	1−2	**10−5−3**
Pittsburgh	0−1−2	1−2	1−2	1−2	0−1−2	2−1	**5−9−4**
Washington	1−2	1−0−2	0−2−1	2−1	2−1	2−1	**8−7−3**

**Vs. Smythe Division**

1981–82 NHL records
Team	**CGY**	**COL**	**EDM**	**LAK**	**VAN**	**Total**
N.Y. Islanders	1−0−2	2−0−1	1−1−1	1−2	2−1	**7−4−4**
N.Y. Rangers	2−0−1	2−0−1	0−3	2−1	3−0	**9−4−2**
Philadelphia	3−0	2−1	1−2	2−0−1	0−2−1	**8−5−2**
Pittsburgh	0−1−2	3−0	0−3	1−1−1	2−0−1	**6−5−4**
Washington	3−0	1−2	0−2−1	1−1−1	1−1−1	**6−6−3**

== Playoffs ==
After a third-place finish the Flyers lost in four games to the Rangers in the first round of the playoffs. For the first time in since 1971, they failed to make it past the first round.

== Schedule and results ==
=== Regular season ===
1981–82 regular season
October: 8–2–1, 17 points (home: 5–1–1; road: 3–1–0)

Game	Date	Score	Opponent	Decision	Record	Points	Recap
1	October 9	2–2	Detroit Red Wings	St. Croix	0–0–1	1	T
2	October 11	8–2	Pittsburgh Penguins	Peeters	1–0–1	3	W
3	October 14	5–4	@ Washington Capitals	Peeters	2–0–1	5	W
4	October 15	5–2	Washington Capitals	St. Croix	3–0–1	7	W
5	October 18	3–2	Minnesota North Stars	Peeters	4–0–1	9	W
6	October 22	3–2	Quebec Nordiques	St. Croix	5–0–1	11	W
7	October 24	6–3	@ St. Louis Blues	Peeters	6–0–1	13	W
8	October 25	4–1	@ Detroit Red Wings	St. Croix	7–0–1	15	W
9	October 27	2–11	@ Montreal Canadiens	Peeters	7–1–1	15	L
10	October 29	6–4	Pittsburgh Penguins	St. Croix	8–1–1	17	W
11	October 31	4–8	Vancouver Canucks	Peeters	8–2–1	17	L

November: 4–8–0, 8 points (home: 3–2–0; road: 1–6–0)

Game	Date	Score	Opponent	Decision	Record	Points	Recap
12	November 1	2–6	@ Buffalo Sabres	Lindbergh	8–3–1	17	L
13	November 5	2–6	New York Rangers	St. Croix	8–4–1	17	L
14	November 7	2–7	@ Pittsburgh Penguins	Lindbergh	8–5–1	17	L
15	November 12	5–3	Hartford Whalers	St. Croix	9–5–1	19	W
16	November 14	0–4	@ Toronto Maple Leafs	St. Croix	9–6–1	19	L
17	November 15	5–4	New York Islanders	Peeters	10–6–1	21	W
18	November 18	2–5	@ New York Rangers	Peeters	10–7–1	21	L
19	November 21	4–10	@ Washington Capitals	St. Croix	10–8–1	21	L
20	November 22	2–3	Washington Capitals	Peeters	10–9–1	21	L
21	November 24	6–3	Toronto Maple Leafs	Peeters	11–9–1	23	W
22	November 26	3–1	@ Boston Bruins	Peeters	12–9–1	25	W
23	November 28	3–5	@ Minnesota North Stars	Peeters	12–10–1	25	L

December: 10–3–0, 20 points (home: 5–1–0; road: 5–2–0)

Game	Date	Score	Opponent	Decision	Record	Points	Recap
24	December 1	2–1	Winnipeg Jets	Peeters	13–10–1	27	W
25	December 3	6–1	Calgary Flames	Peeters	14–10–1	29	W
26	December 5	5–2	@ Detroit Red Wings	Peeters	15–10–1	31	W
27	December 6	8–2	St. Louis Blues	Peeters	16–10–1	33	W
28	December 9	4–1	@ Pittsburgh Penguins	Peeters	17–10–1	35	W
29	December 12	3–5	New York Rangers	Peeters	17–11–1	35	L
30	December 16	7–3	@ New York Rangers	St. Croix	18–11–1	37	W
31	December 17	2–1	Buffalo Sabres	Peeters	19–11–1	39	W
32	December 20	3–1	Pittsburgh Penguins	Peeters	20–11–1	41	W
33	December 23	7–6	@ Chicago Black Hawks	Peeters	21–11–1	43	W
34	December 26	2–4	@ New York Islanders	Peeters	21–12–1	43	L
35	December 28	7–4	@ Calgary Flames	St. Croix	22–12–1	45	W
36	December 30	5–7	@ Edmonton Oilers	Peeters	22–13–1	45	L

January: 6–6–3, 15 points (home: 4–2–0; road: 2–4–3)

Game	Date	Score	Opponent	Decision	Record	Points	Recap
37	January 2	5–3	@ St. Louis Blues	St. Croix	23–13–1	47	W
38	January 5	5–3	Los Angeles Kings	Peeters	24–13–1	49	W
39	January 7	4–5	New York Islanders	St. Croix	24–14–1	49	L
40	January 9	1–3	@ New York Islanders	Peeters	24–15–1	49	L
41	January 10	5–4	Colorado Rockies	St. Croix	25–15–1	51	W
42	January 14	8–2	Edmonton Oilers	Peeters	26–15–1	53	W
43	January 16	4–2	@ Montreal Canadiens	St. Croix	27–15–1	55	W
44	January 17	7–3	Boston Bruins	Peeters	28–15–1	57	W
45	January 19	2–2	@ Quebec Nordiques	St. Croix	28–15–2	58	T
46	January 21	2–4	Montreal Canadiens	Peeters	28–16–2	58	L
47	January 23	5–5	@ Pittsburgh Penguins	St. Croix	28–16–3	59	T
48	January 26	4–7	@ Colorado Rockies	Peeters	28–17–3	59	L
49	January 27	4–4	@ Los Angeles Kings	St. Croix	28–17–4	60	T
50	January 30	2–4	@ Vancouver Canucks	Peeters	28–18–4	60	L
51	January 31	4–7	@ Edmonton Oilers	St. Croix	28–19–4	60	L

February: 4–6–2, 10 points (home: 3–2–1; road: 1–4–1)

Game	Date	Score	Opponent	Decision	Record	Points	Recap
52	February 4	3–3	Minnesota North Stars	Peeters	28–19–5	61	T
53	February 6	3–4	@ Quebec Nordiques	St. Croix	28–20–5	61	L
54	February 7	5–4	Pittsburgh Penguins	Peeters	29–20–5	63	W
55	February 11	6–4	Buffalo Sabres	Peeters	30–20–5	65	W
56	February 13	2–8	@ New York Islanders	Peeters	30–21–5	65	L
57	February 14	6–4	Los Angeles Kings	St. Croix	31–21–5	67	W
58	February 18	4–7	New York Islanders	St. Croix	31–22–5	67	L
59	February 20	5–6	@ Pittsburgh Penguins	Peeters	31–23–5	67	L
60	February 21	0–1	Boston Bruins	Peeters	31–24–5	67	L
61	February 24	2–6	@ Winnipeg Jets	Peeters	31–25–5	67	L
62	February 27	9–8	@ Calgary Flames	Peeters	32–25–5	69	W
63	February 28	3–3	@ Vancouver Canucks	St. Croix	32–25–6	70	T

March: 5–5–4, 14 points (home: 4–2–2; road: 1–3–2)

Game	Date	Score	Opponent	Decision	Record	Points	Recap
64	March 2	6–7	Winnipeg Jets	Peeters	32–26–6	70	L
65	March 4	4–4	New York Rangers	Lindbergh	32–26–7	71	T
66	March 6	1–4	@ Chicago Black Hawks	St. Croix	32–27–7	71	L
67	March 7	7–1	Washington Capitals	St. Croix	33–27–7	73	W
68	March 10	5–5	@ New York Rangers	St. Croix	33–27–8	74	T
69	March 11	5–1	Colorado Rockies	St. Croix	34–27–8	76	W
70	March 13	3–6	@ Washington Capitals	St. Croix	34–28–8	76	L
71	March 17	2–5	@ New York Rangers	Lindbergh	34–29–8	76	L
72	March 18	4–4	Chicago Black Hawks	Lindbergh	34–29–9	77	T
73	March 20	5–2	@ Hartford Whalers	Lindbergh	35–29–9	79	W
74	March 21	5–3	Hartford Whalers	Lindbergh	36–29–9	81	W
75	March 25	3–4	Washington Capitals	Lindbergh	36–30–9	81	L
76	March 27	4–4	@ Washington Capitals	Peeters	36–30–10	82	T
77	March 28	3–1	New York Rangers	Peeters	37–30–10	84	W

April: 1–1–1, 3 points (home: 1–0–1; road: 0–1–0)

Game	Date	Score	Opponent	Decision	Record	Points	Recap
78	April 1	3–3	New York Islanders	Peeters	37–30–11	85	T
79	April 3	3–6	@ New York Islanders	Peeters	37–31–11	85	L
80	April 4	7–1	Toronto Maple Leafs	Peeters	38–31–11	87	W

Legend: W Win (2 points) L Loss (0 points) T Tie (1 point)

=== Playoffs ===
1982 Stanley Cup playoffs
Patrick Division Semifinals vs. New York Rangers – Rangers win 3–1

Game	Date	Score	Opponent	Decision	Series	Recap
1	April 7	4–1	@ New York Rangers	Peeters	Flyers lead 1–0	W
2	April 8	3–7	@ New York Rangers	Peeters	Series tied 1–1	L
3	April 10	3–4	New York Rangers	Peeters	Rangers lead 2–1	L
4	April 11	5–7	New York Rangers	St. Croix	Rangers win 3–1	L

Legend: W Win L Loss

== Player statistics ==
=== Scoring ===
- Position abbreviations: C = Center; D = Defense; G = Goaltender; LW = Left wing; RW = Right wing
- † = Joined team via a transaction (e.g., trade, waivers, signing) during the season. Stats reflect time with the Flyers only.
- ‡ = Left team via a transaction (e.g., trade, waivers, release) during the season. Stats reflect time with the Flyers only.

No.	Player	Pos	Regular season						Playoffs					
No.	Player	Pos	GP	G	A	Pts	+/-	PIM	GP	G	A	Pts	+/-	PIM
14	Ken Linseman	C	79	24	68	92	6	275	4	1	2	3	−1	6
26	Brian Propp	LW	80	44	47	91	19	117	4	2	2	4	−1	4
7	Bill Barber	LW	80	45	44	89	4	85	4	1	5	6	1	4
11	Ron Flockhart	C	72	33	39	72	18	44	4	0	1	1	−2	2
16	Bobby Clarke	C	62	17	46	63	28	154	4	4	2	6	3	4
19	Ray Allison	RW	51	17	37	54	13	104	3	2	0	2	−1	2
12	Tim Kerr	RW	61	21	30	51	6	138	4	0	2	2	0	2
27	Reggie Leach	RW	66	26	21	47	2	18	—	—	—	—	—	—
23	Ilkka Sinisalo	LW	66	15	22	37	18	22	4	0	2	2	0	0
3	Behn Wilson	D	59	13	23	36	6	135	4	1	4	5	1	10
9	Darryl Sittler†	C	35	14	18	32	−1	50	4	3	1	4	−2	6
17	Paul Holmgren	RW	41	9	22	31	10	183	4	1	2	3	−1	6
24 (Note: Hoffmeyer wore number 35 in his first eleven games after being re-acquired.)	Bob Hoffmeyer†	D	57	7	20	27	13	142	2	0	1	1	0	25
8	Brad Marsh†	D	66	2	22	24	17	106	4	0	0	0	−1	2
15	Al Hill	LW	41	6	13	19	−4	58	3	0	0	0	−2	0
25	Greg Adams	LW	33	4	15	19	7	105	—	—	—	—	—	—
29	Glen Cochrane	D	63	6	12	18	19	329	1	0	0	0	0	0
28	Mark Botell	D	32	4	10	14	8	31	—	—	—	—	—	—
22	Tom Gorence	RW	66	5	8	13	−17	8	3	0	0	0	−2	0
10	Mel Bridgman‡	C	9	7	5	12	0	47	—	—	—	—	—	—
20	Jimmy Watson	D	76	3	9	12	12	99	4	0	1	1	−1	2
6	Fred Arthur	D	74	1	7	8	−8	47	4	0	0	0	−2	2
2	Bob Dailey	D	12	1	5	6	4	22	—	—	—	—	—	—
5	Frank Bathe	D	28	1	3	4	11	68	4	0	0	0	1	2
18	Lindsay Carson	C	18	0	1	1	−15	32	—	—	—	—	—	—
33	Pete Peeters	G	44	0	1	1		19	4	0	0	0		0
24	Steve Smith	D	8	0	1	1	−2	0	—	—	—	—	—	—
30	Rick St. Croix	G	29	0	1	1		2	1	0	0	0		0
35 (Note: Bailey wore number 9 during the regular season.)	Reid Bailey	D	10	0	0	0	−5	23	2	0	0	0	−2	0
8	Thomas Eriksson	D	1	0	0	0	−1	4	—	—	—	—	—	—
31	Pelle Lindbergh	G	8	0	0	0		0	—	—	—	—	—	—
35	Dave Michayluk	RW	1	0	0	0	−2	0	—	—	—	—	—	—
21	Gary Morrison	RW	7	0	0	0	−6	2	—	—	—	—	—	—
35	Mark Taylor	C	2	0	0	0	−1	0	—	—	—	—	—	—
35	Gord Williams	RW	1	0	0	0	0	2	—	—	—	—	—	—

=== Goaltending ===
No.	Player	Regular season											Playoffs									
No.	Player	GP	GS	W	L	T	SA	GA	GAA	SV%	SO	TOI	GP	GS	W	L	SA	GA	GAA	SV%	SO	TOI
33	Pete Peeters	44	44	23	18	3	1242	160	3.72	.871	0	2,582	4	4	1	2	106	17	4.65	.840	0	219
30	Rick St. Croix	29	28	13	9	6	861	112	3.89	.870	0	1,726	1	0	0	1	8	1	3.11	.875	0	19
31	Pelle Lindbergh	8	8	2	4	2	290	35	4.39	.879	0	478	—	—	—	—	—	—	—	—	—	—

== Awards and records ==
=== Awards ===
Type	Award/honor	Recipient	Ref
League (in-season)	NHL All-Star Game selection	Bill Barber	
League (in-season)	NHL All-Star Game selection	Brian Propp	
League (in-season)	NHL Player of the Week	Pete Peeters (December 7)	
Team	Barry Ashbee Trophy	Frank Bathe	
Team	Class Guy Award	Bobby Clarke	

=== Records ===
Among the team records set during the 1981–82 season was the one minute and twenty-two seconds it took to score the fastest four goals in team history on October 11. Ron Flockhart set two records during the season. On December 6, Flockhart scored two goals eight seconds apart, the fastest two goals by one player in team history. From February 4 to February 20, Flockhart went eight consecutive games with a goal, the longest such streak for a rookie in team history. The Flyers set the franchise season marks for most powerplay goals allowed (102) and tied the mark for fewest shutouts (0).

=== Milestones ===
Milestone	Player	Date	Ref
First game	Ilkka Sinisalo	October 9, 1981	
First game	Lindsay Carson	October 9, 1981	
First game	Pelle Lindbergh	November 1, 1981	
First game	Steve Smith	November 5, 1981	
First game	Mark Botell	November 24, 1981	
First game	Mark Taylor	December 20, 1981	
First game	Dave Michayluk	December 28, 1981	
First game	Gord Williams	February 24, 1982	
400th goal	Darryl Sittler	March 18, 1982	

== Transactions ==
The Flyers were involved in the following transactions from May 22, 1981, the day after the deciding game of the 1981 Stanley Cup Final, through May 16, 1982, the day of the deciding game of the 1982 Stanley Cup Final.

=== Trades ===
Date	Details		Ref
July 3, 1981	To Philadelphia Flyers: Ray Allison; Fred Arthur (Note: The Flyers received Hartford's 1984 3rd-round pick as compensation after Arthur retired in October 1982.); 1st-round pick in 1982; 3rd-round pick in 1982	To Hartford Whalers: Don Gillen; Rick MacLeish; Blake Wesley; 1st-round pick in 1982; 2nd-round pick in 1982; 3rd-round pick in 1982	
November 11, 1981	To Philadelphia Flyers: Brad Marsh	To Calgary Flames: Mel Bridgman	
January 20, 1982	To Philadelphia Flyers: Darryl Sittler	To Toronto Maple Leafs: Rich Costello; Hartford's 2nd-round pick in 1982; Future considerations (Note: Ken Strong was sent to Toronto on May 1, 1982, to complete the trade.)	

=== Players acquired ===
Date	Player	Former team	Via	Ref
June 18, 1981	Bob Froese	Saginaw Gears (IHL)	Free agency	
October 9, 1981	Daryl Stanley	Saskatoon Blades (WHL)	Free agency	
November 22, 1981	Bob Hoffmeyer	Maine Mariners (AHL)	Free agency	

=== Players lost ===
Date	Player	New team	Via	Ref
June 29, 1981	Robbie Moore	Minnesota North Stars	Free agency	
August 11, 1981	Dave Logan	Toronto Maple Leafs	Free agency	
N/A	Yves Preston	Milwaukee Admirals (IHL)	Free agency	
October 5, 1981	Terry Murray	Washington Capitals	Waiver draft	

=== Signings ===
Date	Player	Term	Ref
June 11, 1981	Brian Tutt		
June 16, 1981	Dan Held		
August 18, 1981	Tom Gorence	multi-year	
August 21, 1981	Mel Bridgman	multi-year	
September 29, 1981	Reggie Leach	multi-year	

== Draft picks ==
Philadelphia's picks at the 1981 NHL entry draft, which was held at the Montreal Forum in Montreal, on June 10, 1981.

Round	Pick	Player	Position	Nationality	Team (league)	Notes
1	16	Steve Smith	Defense	Canada	Sault Ste. Marie Greyhounds (OHL)	
2	37	Rich Costello	Forward	United States	Natick High School (Massachusetts)	
3	47	Barry Tabobondung	Defense	Canada	Oshawa Generals (OHL)	(Note: The Flyers traded Wayne Stephenson to the Washington Capitals for the Capitals' third-round pick on August 16, 1979.)
3	58	Ken Strong	Forward	Canada	Peterborough Petes (OHL)	
4	65	Dave Michayluk	Left wing	Canada	Regina Pats (WHL)	(Note: The Flyers traded Dennis Sobchuk to the Detroit Red Wings for the Red Wings' third or fourth-round pick on September 4, 1979.)
4	79	Ken Latta	Right wing	Canada	Sault Ste. Marie Greyhounds (OHL)	
5	100	Justin Hanley	Center	Canada	Kingston Canadians (OHL)	
6	121	Andre Villeneuve	Defense	Canada	Chicoutimi Saguenéens (QMJHL)	
7	137	Vladimir Svitek	Forward	Czechoslovakia	HC Košice (CZE)	(Note: The Flyers traded Andre Dupont to the Quebec Nordiques for cash and the Nordiques' seventh-round pick on September 15, 1980.)
7	142	Gil Hudon	Goaltender	Canada	Prince Albert Raiders (SJHL)	
8	163	Steve Taylor	Left wing	United States	Providence College (HE)	
9	184	Len Hachborn	Center	Canada	Brantford Alexanders (OHL)	
10	205	Steve Tsujiura	Center	Canada	Medicine Hat Tigers (WHL)	

== Farm teams ==
The Flyers were affiliated with the Maine Mariners of the AHL and the Toledo Goaldiggers of the IHL.
