= 1981–82 Colorado Rockies season =

NHL hockey team season (final season in Colorado)

1981–82 Colorado Rockies
- Division: 5th Smythe
- Conference: 11th Campbell
- 1981–82 record: 18–49–13
- Home record: 14–21–5
- Road record: 4–28–8
- Goals for: 241
- Goals against: 362

Team information
- General manager: Bill MacMillan
- Coach: Bill MacMillan
- Captain: Lanny McDonald (Oct.–Nov.); Rob Ramage (Nov.–Apr.)
- Alternate captains: None
- Arena: McNichols Sports Arena
- Average attendance: 8,180
- Minor league affiliate: Fort Worth Texans (CHL)

Team leaders
- Goals: Steve Tambellini (29)
- Assists: Brent Ashton (36)
- Points: Brent Ashton (60)
- Penalty minutes: Rob Ramage (201)
- Wins: Glenn Resch (16)
- Goals against average: Glenn Resch (4.03)

The 1981–82 Colorado Rockies season was the sixth and final season for the Rockies in Colorado. The franchise would relocate to New Jersey for the 1982–83 season and be renamed the New Jersey Devils. In 1995 the Devils would win the Stanley Cup for the first time in franchise history. The same year, NHL hockey would return to Colorado with the Quebec Nordiques relocating there to become the Avalanche, for the 1995–96 season. They went on to become Stanley Cup champions in their first season in Denver.

== Offseason ==
=== NHL draft ===
Round	#	Player	Nationality	College/junior/club team
1	5	Joe Cirella	Canada	Oshawa Generals (OMJHL)
2	26	Rich Chernomaz	Canada	Victoria Cougars (WHL)
3	48	Uli Hiemer	West Germany	EV Fussen (West Germany)
4	66	Gus Greco	Canada	Windsor Spitfires (OMJHL)
5	87	Doug Speck	Canada	Peterborough Petes (OMJHL)
6	108	Bruce Driver	Canada	University of Wisconsin (WCHA)
7	129	Jeff Larmer	Canada	Kitchener Rangers (OMJHL)
8	150	Tony Arima	Finland	Jokerit (Finland)
9	171	Tim Army	United States	East Providence High School (USHS-RI)
10	192	John Johannson	United States	University of Wisconsin (WCHA)

== Regular season ==
=== Final standings ===
Smythe Division
	GP	W	L	T	GF	GA	PTS
**Edmonton Oilers**	80	48	17	15	417	295	111
**Vancouver Canucks**	80	30	33	17	290	286	77
**Calgary Flames**	80	29	34	17	334	345	75
**Los Angeles Kings**	80	24	41	15	314	369	63
Colorado Rockies	80	18	49	13	241	362	49

Note: GP = Games played, W = Wins, L = Losses, T = Ties, Pts = Points, GF = Goals for, GA = Goals against
Note: Teams that qualified for the playoffs are highlighted in bold.

=== Record vs. opponents ===
Smythe Division record vs. opponents

==== Vs. Campbell Conference ====
**Vs. Smythe Division**

1981–82 NHL records
Team	**CGY**	**COL**	**EDM**	**LAK**	**VAN**	**Total**
Calgary	—	6−2	2−5−1	4−3−1	3−3−2	**15−13−4**
Colorado	2−6	—	2−5−1	2−4−2	2−4−2	**8−19−5**
Edmonton	5−2−1	5−2−1	—	5−1−2	5−2−1	**20−7−5**
Los Angeles	3−4−1	4−2−2	1−5−2	—	3−2−3	**11−13−8**
Vancouver	3−3−2	4−2−2	2−5−1	2−3−3	—	**11−13−8**

**Vs. Norris Division**

1981–82 NHL records
Team	**CHI**	**DET**	**MIN**	**STL**	**TOR**	**WIN**	**Total**
Calgary	0−2−1	1−1−1	0−1−2	1−2	1−0−2	1−2	**4−8−6**
Colorado	2−1	0−3	0−1−2	1−2	0−1−2	1−2	**4−10−4**
Edmonton	1−1−1	2−0−1	2−0−1	3−0	2−1	2−1	**12−3−3**
Los Angeles	0−3	2−1	0−2−1	2−1	1−2	0−3	**5−12−1**
Vancouver	2−1	1−1−1	1−1−1	1−2	2−0−1	2−1	**9−6−3**

**Vs. Wales Conference**

**Vs. Adams Division**

1981–82 NHL records
Team	**BOS**	**BUF**	**HFD**	**MTL**	**QUE**	**Total**
Calgary	1−1−1	2−0−1	2−1	1−2	3−0	**9−4−2**
Colorado	0−3	0−3	2−0−1	0−2−1	1−2	**3−10−2**
Edmonton	0−1−2	2−1	2−0−1	0−1−2	1−2	**5−5−5**
Los Angeles	0−3	1−2	0−2−1	1−2	1−0−2	**3−9−3**
Vancouver	1−2	1−1−1	2−0−1	1−2	1−1−1	**6−6−3**

**Vs. Patrick Division**

1981–82 NHL records
Team	**NYI**	**NYR**	**PHI**	**PIT**	**WSH**	**Total**
Calgary	0−1−2	0−2−1	0−3	1−0−2	0−3	**1−9−5**
Colorado	0−2−1	0−2−1	1−2	0−3	2−1	**3−10−2**
Edmonton	1−1−1	3−0	2−1	3−0	2−0−1	**11−2−2**
Los Angeles	2−1	1−2	0−2−1	1−1−1	1−1−1	**5−7−3**
Vancouver	1−2	0−3	2−0–1	0–2−1	1−1−1	**4–8–3**

== Schedule and results ==
1981–82 regular season
October: 2–7–2 (home: 1–3–1; road: 1–4–1)

Game	Date	Visitor	Score	Home	Decision	Attendance	Record	Points	Recap
1	October 6	Colorado	2–4	Vancouver	Resch		0–1–0	0	
2	October 7	Colorado	4–7	Edmonton	Myre		0–2–0	0	
3	October 10	N.Y. Islanders	2–2	Colorado	Resch		0–2–1	1	
4	October 15	Colorado	2–10	Los Angeles	Resch		0–3–1	1	
5	October 16	Boston	6–1	Colorado	Myre		0–4–1	1	
6	October 18	Colorado	4–3	Winnipeg	Resch		1–4–1	3	
7	October 20	Colorado	3–5	Pittsburgh	Myre		1–5–1	3	
8	October 21	Colorado	4–4	Toronto	Resch		1–5–2	4	
9	October 24	Edmonton	3–1	Colorado	Resch		1–6–2	4	
10	October 28	Quebec	3–1	Colorado	Resch		1–7–2	4	
11	October 31	Washington	4–6	Colorado	Resch		2–7–2	6	

November: 1–10–3 (home: 0–5–1; road: 1–5–2)

Game	Date	Visitor	Score	Home	Decision	Attendance	Record	Points	Recap
12	November 3	Winnipeg	3–5	Colorado	Myre		2–8–2	6	
13	November 6	Toronto	4–4	Colorado	Myre		2–8–3	7	
14	November 7	Colorado	5–4	Edmonton	Resch		3–8–3	9	
15	November 11	Montreal	9–0	Colorado	Resch		3–9–3	9	
16	November 14	St. Louis	4–2	Colorado	Myre		3–10–3	9	
17	November 15	Colorado	0–10	Chicago	Myre		3–11–3	9	
18	November 18	Colorado	1–7	Washington	Janaszak		3–12–3	9	
19	November 20	Buffalo	4–3	Colorado	Myre		3–13–3	9	
20	November 22	Colorado	5–5	Vancouver	Resch		3–13–4	10	
21	November 24	Colorado	2–9	Calgary	Myre		3–14–4	10	
22	November 25	Colorado	2–7	Winnipeg	Resch		3–15–4	10	
23	November 27	Vancouver	6–3	Colorado	Resch		3–16–4	10	
24	November 28	Colorado	2–4	St. Louis	Resch		3–17–4	10	
25	November 30	Colorado	2–2	Minnesota	Resch		3–17–5	11	

December: 6–6–1 (home: 5–2–0; road: 1–4–1)

Game	Date	Visitor	Score	Home	Decision	Attendance	Record	Points	Recap
26	December 2	Chicago	2–3	Colorado	Resch		4–17–5	13	
27	December 5	N.Y. Rangers	2–1	Colorado	Resch		4–18–5	13	
28	December 9	Colorado	1–7	Buffalo	Resch		4–19–5	13	
29	December 12	Colorado	4–2	Hartford	Resch		5–19–5	15	
30	December 13	Colorado	1–5	Boston	Myre		5–20–5	15	
31	December 16	Edmonton	7–4	Colorado	Myre		5–21–5	15	
32	December 18	Vancouver	1–3	Colorado	Myre		6–21–5	17	
33	December 19	Colorado	2–5	Calgary	Resch		6–22–5	17	
34	December 22	Los Angeles	2–4	Colorado	Resch		7–22–5	19	
35	December 23	Colorado	4–8	Los Angeles	Myre		7–23–5	19	
36	December 26	Calgary	3–6	Colorado	Resch		8–23–5	21	
37	December 28	Colorado	4–4	Minnesota	Resch		8–23–6	22	
38	December 30	Los Angeles	2–3	Colorado	Resch		9–23–6	24	

January: 2–11–2 (home: 2–4–1; road: 0–7–1)

Game	Date	Visitor	Score	Home	Decision	Attendance	Record	Points	Recap
39	January 2	Detroit	3–1	Colorado	Resch		9–24–6	24	
40	January 5	Colorado	4–5	Calgary	Resch		9–25–6	24	
41	January 6	Colorado	3–5	Edmonton	Myre		9–26–6	24	
42	January 8	St. Louis	1–7	Colorado	Resch		10–26–6	26	
43	January 10	Colorado	4–5	Philadelphia	Myre		10–27–6	26	
44	January 13	Colorado	1–2	Toronto	Resch		10–28–6	26	
45	January 14	Colorado	1–3	Detroit	Resch		10–29–6	26	
46	January 17	Calgary	5–3	Colorado	Resch		10–30–6	26	
47	January 19	Colorado	4–4	Los Angeles	Myre		10–30–7	27	
48	January 20	Minnesota	3–1	Colorado	Resch		10–31–7	27	
49	January 23	Los Angeles	3–3	Colorado	Resch		10–31–8	28	
50	January 24	Colorado	4–7	Edmonton	Myre		10–32–8	28	
51	January 26	Philadelphia	4–7	Colorado	Resch		11–32–8	30	
52	January 29	N.Y. Rangers	5–2	Colorado	Resch		11–33–8	30	
53	January 31	Colorado	2–4	Boston	Resch		11–34–8	30	

February: 3–5–3 (home: 3–3–1; road: 0–2–2)

Game	Date	Visitor	Score	Home	Decision	Attendance	Record	Points	Recap
54	February 2	Colorado	7–8	Quebec	Myre		11–35–8	30	
55	February 5	Hartford	4–4	Colorado	Resch		11–35–9	31	
56	February 6	Montreal	5–3	Colorado	Resch		11–36–9	31	
34th All-Star Game in Landover, Maryland
57	February 12	Quebec	2–9	Colorado			12–36–9	33	
58	February 14	Washington	3–5	Colorado	Resch		13–36–9	35	
59	February 16	Colorado	3–3	Montreal	Resch		13–36–10	36	
60	February 18	Colorado	4–4	N.Y. Rangers	Resch		13–36–11	37	
61	February 20	Colorado	2–3	N.Y. Islanders	Resch		13–37–12	38	
62	February 21	Colorado	2–6	Buffalo	Resch		13–38–11	37	
63	February 23	Detroit	6–3	Colorado	Resch		13–39–11	37	
64	February 26	Vancouver	4–3	Colorado	Resch		13–40–11	37	
65	February 28	Chicago	3–5	Colorado	Resch		14–40–11	39	

March: 3–8–2 (home: 2–4–1; road: 1–4–1)

Game	Date	Visitor	Score	Home	Decision	Attendance	Record	Points	Recap
66	March 3	Vancouver	2–3	Colorado	Resch		15–40–11	41	
67	March 6	Edmonton	2–5	Colorado	Resch		16–40–11	43	
68	March 9	Los Angeles	2–0	Colorado	Resch		16–41–11	43	
69	March 11	Colorado	1–5	Philadelphia	Resch		16–42–11	43	
70	March 13	Colorado	2–6	Pittsburgh	Myre		16–43–11	43	
71	March 14	Colorado	4–3	Hartford	Myre		17–43–11	45	
72	March 17	N.Y. Islanders	5–2	Colorado	Myre		17–44–11	45	
73	March 20	Calgary	4–2	Colorado	Resch		17–45–11	45	
74	March 21	Pittsburgh	6–0	Colorado	Myre		17–46–11	45	
75	March 24	Colorado	4–5	Vancouver	Myre		17–47–11	45	
76	March 26	Edmonton	6–6	Colorado	Resch		17–47–12	46	
77	March 27	Colorado	4–9	Los Angeles	Resch		17–48–12	46	
78	March 31	Colorado	4–4	Vancouver	Resch		17–48–13	47	

April: 1–1–0 (home: 1–0–0; road: 0–1–0)

Game	Date	Visitor	Score	Home	Decision	Attendance	Record	Points	Recap
79	April 1	Colorado	0–11	Calgary	Myre		17–49–13	47	
80	April 3	Calgary	1–3	Colorado	Resch		18–49–13	49	

Legend: Win (2 points) Loss (0 points) Tie (1 point)

== Player statistics ==
=== Regular season ===
Scoring

Player	Pos	GP	G	A	Pts	PIM	+/-	PPG	SHG	GWG
Brent Ashton	LW	80	24	36	60	26	-31	3	0	4
Steve Tambellini	C	79	29	30	59	14	-33	9	0	0
Don Lever	LW	59	22	28	50	20	-10	3	0	1
Bob MacMillan	RW	57	18	32	50	27	-9	3	0	1
Rob Ramage	D	80	13	29	42	201	-47	6	0	0
Merlin Malinowski	C	69	13	28	41	32	-22	0	1	0
Aaron Broten	LW/C	58	15	24	39	6	-11	5	1	5
Dwight Foster	RW	70	12	19	31	41	-53	1	1	0
Bob Miller	C	56	11	20	31	27	-24	1	0	2
Dave Cameron	C	66	11	12	23	103	-14	0	1	0
Paul Gagne	LW	59	10	12	22	17	-27	2	0	0
Tapio Levo	D	34	9	13	22	14	-13	3	0	0
Bob Lorimer	D	79	5	15	20	68	-19	1	0	0
Joe Cirella	D	65	7	12	19	52	-36	2	0	1
Lanny McDonald	RW	16	6	9	15	20	-3	0	0	1
Joel Quenneville	D	64	5	10	15	55	-29	0	0	0
Veli-Pekka Ketola	C	44	9	5	14	4	-17	4	0	1
Kevin Maxwell	C	34	5	5	10	44	-16	0	0	1
Graeme Nicolson	D	41	2	7	9	51	-16	0	0	0
Mike Kitchen	D	63	1	8	9	60	-18	0	0	0
John Wensink	LW	57	5	3	8	152	-13	1	0	0
Joe Micheletti	D	21	2	6	8	4	-4	0	0	0
Jukka Porvari	RW	31	2	6	8	0	-22	0	0	0
Stan Weir	C	10	2	3	5	10	-7	0	0	1
Yvon Vautour	RW	14	1	2	3	18	-6	1	0	0
Bill Baker	D	14	0	3	3	17	-13	0	0	0
Paul Miller	C	3	0	3	3	0	2	0	0	0
Jeff Larmer	LW	8	1	1	2	8	-3	0	0	0
Phil Myre	G	24	0	2	2	0	0	0	0	0
Glenn Resch	G	61	0	2	2	8	0	0	0	0
Ed Cooper	LW	2	1	0	1	0	0	0	0	0
Rich Chernomaz	RW	2	0	0	0	0	-2	0	0	0
Jim Dobson	RW	3	0	0	0	2	-1	0	0	0
Peter Gustavsson	LW	2	0	0	0	0	-1	0	0	0
Jack Hughes	D	8	0	0	0	13	-7	0	0	0
Steve Janaszak	G	2	0	0	0	0	0	0	0	0
Christer Kellgren	RW	5	0	0	0	0	-4	0	0	0
Rick LaFerriere	G	1	0	0	0	0	0	0	0	0
Randy Pierce	RW	5	0	0	0	4	-1	0	0	0

Goaltending

Player	MIN	GP	W	L	T	GA	GAA	SO
Glenn Resch	3424	61	16	31	11	230	4.03	0
Phil Myre	1256	24	2	17	2	112	5.35	0
Steve Janaszak	100	2	0	1	0	13	7.80	0
Rick LaFerriere	20	1	0	0	0	1	3.00	0
Team:	4800	80	18	49	13	356	4.45	0

Note: GP = Games played; G = Goals; A = Assists; Pts = Points; +/- = Plus/minus; PIM = Penalty minutes; PPG=Power-play goals; SHG=Short-handed goals; GWG=Game-winning goals
MIN=Minutes played; W = Wins; L = Losses; T = Ties; GA = Goals against; GAA = Goals against average; SO = Shutouts;
