= 1981–82 Los Angeles Kings season =

National Hockey League team season

1981–82 Los Angeles Kings
- Division: 4th Smythe
- Conference: 8th Campbell
- 1981–82 record: 24–41–15
- Home record: 19–15–6
- Road record: 5–26–9
- Goals for: 314
- Goals against: 369

Team information
- General manager: George Maguire
- Coach: Parker MacDonald; Don Perry
- Captain: Dave Lewis
- Alternate captains: None
- Arena: The Forum
- Average attendance: 10,742

Team leaders
- Goals: Marcel Dionne (51)
- Assists: Marcel Dionne (67)
- Points: Marcel Dionne (117)
- Penalty minutes: Jay Wells (145)
- Plus/minus: John Gibson (4)
- Wins: Mario Lessard (13)
- Goals against average: Mario Lessard (4.39)

The 1981–82 Los Angeles Kings season, was the Kings' 15th season in the National Hockey League (NHL). It saw the Kings make the playoffs, winning the first round before falling in the second round to the Vancouver Canucks. The first round upset of the heavily favored Edmonton Oilers is considered to be one of the greatest upsets in NHL history.

== Offseason ==
The Kings were moved to the Smythe Division. The Kings now were in a division with western teams.

== Regular season ==
=== Final standings ===
Smythe Division
	GP	W	L	T	GF	GA	PTS
**Edmonton Oilers**	80	48	17	15	417	295	111
**Vancouver Canucks**	80	30	33	17	290	286	77
**Calgary Flames**	80	29	34	17	334	345	75
**Los Angeles Kings**	80	24	41	15	314	369	63
Colorado Rockies	80	18	49	13	241	362	49

Note: GP = Games played, W = Wins, L = Losses, T = Ties, Pts = Points, GF = Goals for, GA = Goals against
Note: Teams that qualified for the playoffs are highlighted in bold.

=== Record vs. opponents ===
Smythe Division record vs. opponents

==== Vs. Campbell Conference ====
**Vs. Smythe Division**

1981–82 NHL records
Team	**CGY**	**COL**	**EDM**	**LAK**	**VAN**	**Total**
Calgary	—	6−2	2−5−1	4−3−1	3−3−2	**15−13−4**
Colorado	2−6	—	2−5−1	2−4−2	2−4−2	**8−19−5**
Edmonton	5−2−1	5−2−1	—	5−1−2	5−2−1	**20−7−5**
Los Angeles	3−4−1	4−2−2	1−5−2	—	3−2−3	**11−13−8**
Vancouver	3−3−2	4−2−2	2−5−1	2−3−3	—	**11−13−8**

**Vs. Norris Division**

1981–82 NHL records
Team	**CHI**	**DET**	**MIN**	**STL**	**TOR**	**WIN**	**Total**
Calgary	0−2−1	1−1−1	0−1−2	1−2	1−0−2	1−2	**4−8−6**
Colorado	2−1	0−3	0−1−2	1−2	0−1−2	1−2	**4−10−4**
Edmonton	1−1−1	2−0−1	2−0−1	3−0	2−1	2−1	**12−3−3**
Los Angeles	0−3	2−1	0−2−1	2−1	1−2	0−3	**5−12−1**
Vancouver	2−1	1−1−1	1−1−1	1−2	2−0−1	2−1	**9−6−3**

**Vs. Wales Conference**

**Vs. Adams Division**

1981–82 NHL records
Team	**BOS**	**BUF**	**HFD**	**MTL**	**QUE**	**Total**
Calgary	1−1−1	2−0−1	2−1	1−2	3−0	**9−4−2**
Colorado	0−3	0−3	2−0−1	0−2−1	1−2	**3−10−2**
Edmonton	0−1−2	2−1	2−0−1	0−1−2	1−2	**5−5−5**
Los Angeles	0−3	1−2	0−2−1	1−2	1−0−2	**3−9−3**
Vancouver	1−2	1−1−1	2−0−1	1−2	1−1−1	**6−6−3**

**Vs. Patrick Division**

1981–82 NHL records
Team	**NYI**	**NYR**	**PHI**	**PIT**	**WSH**	**Total**
Calgary	0−1−2	0−2−1	0−3	1−0−2	0−3	**1−9−5**
Colorado	0−2−1	0−2−1	1−2	0−3	2−1	**3−10−2**
Edmonton	1−1−1	3−0	2−1	3−0	2−0−1	**11−2−2**
Los Angeles	2−1	1−2	0−2−1	1−1−1	1−1−1	**5−7−3**
Vancouver	1−2	0−3	2−0–1	0–2−1	1−1−1	**4–8–3**

== Schedule and results ==
1981–82 regular season
October

Game	Result	Date	Score	Opponent	Record
1	L	October 7, 1981	1–4	New York Islanders (1981–82)	0–1–0
2	L	October 10, 1981	4–7	Edmonton Oilers (1981–82)	0–2–0
3	W	October 13, 1981	4–3	Calgary Flames (1981–82)	1–2–0
4	W	October 15, 1981	10–2	Colorado Rockies (1981–82)	2–2–0
5	L	October 17, 1981	4–5	Boston Bruins (1981–82)	2–3–0
6	W	October 20, 1981	9–6	@ New York Islanders (1981–82)	3–3–0
7	W	October 21, 1981	5–2	@ New York Rangers (1981–82)	4–3–0
8	L	October 24, 1981	3–6	@ Minnesota North Stars (1981–82)	4–4–0
9	L	October 25, 1981	4–9	@ Winnipeg Jets (1981–82)	4–5–0
10	W	October 27, 1981	8–7	Quebec Nordiques (1981–82)	5–5–0
11	W	October 29, 1981	4–3	Washington Capitals (1981–82)	6–5–0
12	L	October 31, 1981	4–5	@ St. Louis Blues (1981–82)	6–6–0

November

Game	Result	Date	Score	Opponent	Record
13	L	November 4, 1981	4–5	@ Chicago Black Hawks (1981–82)	6–7–0
14	L	November 5, 1981	2–10	@ Detroit Red Wings (1981–82)	6–8–0
15	L	November 7, 1981	4–9	Toronto Maple Leafs (1981–82)	6–9–0
16	W	November 10, 1981	4–2	Montreal Canadiens (1981–82)	7–9–0
17	W	November 12, 1981	5–2	St. Louis Blues (1981–82)	8–9–0
18	L	November 14, 1981	2–3	Winnipeg Jets (1981–82)	8–10–0
19	W	November 18, 1981	8–1	Detroit Red Wings (1981–82)	9–10–0
20	L	November 19, 1981	3–6	@ Calgary Flames (1981–82)	9–11–0
21	L	November 21, 1981	1–7	Buffalo Sabres (1981–82)	9–12–0
22	L	November 25, 1981	4–11	@ Edmonton Oilers (1981–82)	9–13–0
23	L	November 26, 1981	1–7	@ Calgary Flames (1981–82)	9–14–0
24	W	November 28, 1981	3–2	Vancouver Canucks (1981–82)	10–14–0

December

Game	Result	Date	Score	Opponent	Record
25	L	December 2, 1981	3–4	New York Rangers (1981–82)	10–15–0
26	L	December 5, 1981	2–3	Chicago Black Hawks (1981–82)	10–16–0
27	T	December 9, 1981	5–5	Edmonton Oilers (1981–82)	10–16–1
28	W	December 12, 1981	7–5	Vancouver Canucks (1981–82)	11–16–1
29	W	December 15, 1981	4–3	@ Buffalo Sabres (1981–82)	12–16–1
30	L	December 16, 1981	6–7	@ Pittsburgh Penguins (1981–82)	12–17–1
31	T	December 19, 1981	5–5	@ Hartford Whalers (1981–82)	12–17–2
32	L	December 20, 1981	4–6	@ Boston Bruins (1981–82)	12–18–2
33	L	December 22, 1981	2–4	@ Colorado Rockies (1981–82)	12–19–2
34	W	December 23, 1981	8–4	Colorado Rockies (1981–82)	13–19–2
35	T	December 26, 1981	2–2	@ Vancouver Canucks (1981–82)	13–19–3
36	L	December 27, 1981	3–10	@ Edmonton Oilers (1981–82)	13–20–3
37	L	December 30, 1981	2–3	@ Colorado Rockies (1981–82)	13–21–3

January

Game	Result	Date	Score	Opponent	Record
38	T	January 2, 1982	5–5	Calgary Flames (1981–82)	13–21–4
39	L	January 5, 1982	3–5	@ Philadelphia Flyers (1981–82)	13–22–4
40	T	January 7, 1982	3–3	@ Washington Capitals (1981–82)	13–22–5
41	L	January 9, 1982	3–5	@ Toronto Maple Leafs (1981–82)	13–23–5
42	L	January 10, 1982	4–6	@ Buffalo Sabres (1981–82)	13–24–5
43	L	January 12, 1982	1–2	@ Montreal Canadiens (1981–82)	13–25–5
44	L	January 14, 1982	2–5	@ Calgary Flames (1981–82)	13–26–5
45	T	January 15, 1982	3–3	@ Vancouver Canucks (1981–82)	13–26–6
46	T	January 19, 1982	4–4	Colorado Rockies (1981–82)	13–26–7
47	T	January 21, 1982	3–3	Minnesota North Stars (1981–82)	13–26–8
48	T	January 23, 1982	3–3	@ Colorado Rockies (1981–82)	13–26–9
49	T	January 24, 1982	5–5	@ Vancouver Canucks (1981–82)	13–26–10
50	T	January 27, 1982	4–4	Philadelphia Flyers (1981–82)	13–26–11
51	W	January 30, 1982	7–4	St. Louis Blues (1981–82)	14–26–11
52	L	January 31, 1982	3–6	New York Rangers (1981–82)	14–27–11

February

Game	Result	Date	Score	Opponent	Record
53	L	February 2, 1982	3–5	Hartford Whalers (1981–82)	14–28–11
54	W	February 6, 1982	5–4	Vancouver Canucks (1981–82)	15–28–11
55	L	February 7, 1982	2–7	Montreal Canadiens (1981–82)	15–29–11
56	T	February 11, 1982	4–4	Quebec Nordiques (1981–82)	15–29–12
57	T	February 13, 1982	3–3	@ Pittsburgh Penguins (1981–82)	15–29–13
58	L	February 14, 1982	4–6	@ Philadelphia Flyers (1981–82)	15–30–13
59	L	February 17, 1982	2–5	Washington Capitals (1981–82)	15–31–13
60	W	February 20, 1982	6–2	Calgary Flames (1981–82)	16–31–13
61	W	February 24, 1982	5–3	Detroit Red Wings (1981–82)	17–31–13
62	L	February 27, 1982	3–5	Chicago Black Hawks (1981–82)	17–32–13

March

Game	Result	Date	Score	Opponent	Record
63	T	March 1, 1982	5–5	@ Quebec Nordiques (1981–82)	17–32–14
64	W	March 3, 1982	4–1	@ Toronto Maple Leafs (1981–82)	18–32–14
65	L	March 6, 1982	0–4	@ Boston Bruins (1981–82)	18–33–14
66	L	March 7, 1982	6–7	@ Hartford Whalers (1981–82)	18–34–14
67	W	March 9, 1982	2–0	@ Colorado Rockies (1981–82)	19–34–14
68	W	March 10, 1982	3–2	Edmonton Oilers (1981–82)	20–34–14
69	W	March 13, 1982	3–0	New York Islanders (1981–82)	21–34–14
70	T	March 15, 1982	3–3	@ Edmonton Oilers (1981–82)	21–34–15
71	W	March 17, 1982	9–4	Calgary Flames (1981–82)	22–34–15
72	W	March 20, 1982	7–5	Pittsburgh Penguins (1981–82)	23–34–15
73	L	March 22, 1982	2–4	@ Minnesota North Stars (1981–82)	23–35–15
74	L	March 24, 1982	3–5	@ Winnipeg Jets (1981–82)	23–36–15
75	W	March 27, 1982	9–4	Colorado Rockies (1981–82)	24–36–15
76	L	March 28, 1982	2–6	Edmonton Oilers (1981–82)	24–37–15
77	L	March 30, 1982	5–7	@ Calgary Flames (1981–82)	24–38–15
78	L	March 31, 1982	3–7	@ Edmonton Oilers (1981–82)	24–39–15

April

Game	Result	Date	Score	Opponent	Record
79	L	April 3, 1982	0–6	Vancouver Canucks (1981–82)	24–40–15
80	L	April 4, 1982	4–7	@ Vancouver Canucks (1981–82)	24–41–15

Legend: Win (2 points) Loss (0 points) Tie (1 point)

== Playoffs ==
Miracle on Manchester

== Player statistics ==
Regular season
Scoring

Player	Pos	GP	G	A	Pts	PIM	+/-	PPG	SHG	GWG
Marcel Dionne	C	78	50	67	117	50	-10	17	1	5
Dave Taylor	RW	78	39	67	106	130	-4	13	0	3
Jim Fox	RW	77	30	38	68	23	-15	5	1	0
Larry Murphy	D	79	22	44	66	95	-13	8	1	2
Steve Bozek	LW	71	33	23	56	68	-6	10	0	5
Mark Hardy	D	77	6	39	45	130	-12	1	0	0
Charlie Simmer	LW	50	15	24	39	42	-7	3	0	2
Greg Terrion	LW	61	15	22	37	23	-12	1	0	3
Dan Bonar	C	79	13	23	36	111	-4	1	0	0
Bernie Nicholls	C	22	14	18	32	27	2	8	1	1
Doug Smith	C	80	16	14	30	64	-13	1	0	1
Steve Jensen	LW	45	8	19	27	19	-14	1	0	1
Ian Turnbull	D	42	11	15	26	81	0	1	0	1
John Paul Kelly	LW	70	12	11	23	100	-21	0	0	0
Jerry Korab	D	50	5	13	18	91	-19	3	0	0
Mike Murphy	RW	28	5	10	15	20	0	0	2	0
Dean Hopkins	RW	41	2	13	15	102	-20	0	0	0
Dave Lewis	D	64	1	13	14	75	-19	0	0	0
Trevor Johansen	D	46	3	7	10	69	-14	0	0	0
Rick Chartraw	D/RW	33	2	8	10	56	-11	1	0	0
Jay Wells	D	60	1	8	9	145	2	0	0	0
Daryl Evans	LW	14	2	6	8	2	2	0	0	0
Al Hangsleben	D	18	2	6	8	65	3	0	0	0
Paul Mulvey	LW	11	0	7	7	50	0	0	0	0
Andre St. Laurent	C	16	2	4	6	28	2	0	1	0
Billy Harris	RW	16	1	3	4	6	-9	0	0	0
Rick Martin	LW	3	1	3	4	2	1	1	0	0
Scott Gruhl	LW	7	2	1	3	2	1	0	0	0
Al Sims	D	8	1	1	2	16	-3	0	0	0
Warren Holmes	C	3	0	2	2	0	1	0	0	0
Mario Lessard	G	52	0	2	2	6	0	0	0	0
Robert Palmer	D	5	0	2	2	0	1	0	0	0
Mike Blake	G	2	0	0	0	0	0	0	0	0
John Gibson	D	6	0	0	0	18	4	0	0	0
Glenn Goldup	RW	2	0	0	0	2	0	0	0	0
Doug Keans	G	31	0	0	0	0	0	0	0	0
Dave Morrison	RW	4	0	0	0	0	-1	0	0	0
Jim Rutherford	G	7	0	0	0	0	0	0	0	0
Bobby Sheehan	C	4	0	0	0	2	-2	0	0	0

Goaltending

Player	MIN	GP	W	L	T	GA	GAA	SO
Mario Lessard	2933	52	13	28	8	213	4.36	2
Doug Keans	1436	31	8	10	7	103	4.30	0
Jim Rutherford	380	7	3	3	0	43	6.79	0
Mike Blake	51	2	0	0	0	2	2.35	0
Team:	4800	80	24	41	15	361	4.51	2

Playoffs
Scoring

Player	Pos	GP	G	A	Pts	PIM	PPG	SHG	GWG
Daryl Evans	LW	10	5	8	13	12	1	0	1
Marcel Dionne	C	10	7	4	11	0	4	0	0
Charlie Simmer	LW	10	4	7	11	22	1	0	1
Dave Taylor	RW	10	4	6	10	20	3	0	0
Larry Murphy	D	10	2	8	10	12	1	0	0
Steve Bozek	LW	10	4	1	5	6	2	0	1
Doug Smith	C	10	3	2	5	11	1	0	0
Dan Bonar	C	10	2	3	5	11	0	0	0
Jim Fox	RW	9	1	4	5	0	0	0	0
Bernie Nicholls	C	10	4	0	4	23	0	0	1
Jay Wells	D	10	1	3	4	41	0	0	0
Dean Hopkins	RW	10	0	4	4	15	0	0	0
Dave Lewis	D	10	0	4	4	36	0	0	0
Mike Murphy	RW	10	2	1	3	32	0	0	0
Mark Hardy	D	10	1	2	3	9	0	0	0
Rick Chartraw	D/RW	10	0	2	2	17	0	0	0
Jerry Korab	D	10	0	2	2	26	0	0	0
Mario Lessard	G	10	0	2	2	2	0	0	0
John Paul Kelly	LW	10	1	0	1	14	1	0	0
Doug Keans	G	2	0	0	0	0	0	0	0
Brock Tredway	RW	1	0	0	0	0	0	0	0

Goaltending

Player	MIN	GP	W	L	GA	GAA	SO
Mario Lessard	583	10	4	5	41	4.22	0
Doug Keans	32	2	0	1	1	1.88	0
Team:	615	10	4	6	42	4.10	0

Note:

Pos = Position;GP = Games played; G = Goals; A = Assists; Pts = Points; PIM = Penalty minutes; +/- = Plus/minus; PPG = Power-play goals; SHG = Short-handed goals; GWG = Game-winning goals
Pos = Position;GP = Games played; Min, TOI = Minutes played; W = Wins; L = Losses; T,T/OT = Ties; OTL = Overtime losses; GA = Goals-against; GAA = Goals-against average; SO = Shutouts; SA = Shots against; SV = Shots saved;SV% = Save percentage;

== Transactions ==
The Kings were involved in the following transactions during the 1981–82 season.

=== Trades ===
August 10, 1981	To Los Angeles Kings 5th round pick in 1983 – Garry Galley	To Edmonton Oilers Jay McFarlane
August 10, 1981	To Los Angeles Kings Bob Gladney; 6th round pick in 1983 – Kevin Stevens	To Toronto Maple Leafs Don Luce
November 11, 1981	To Los Angeles Kings Ian Turnbull	To Toronto Maple Leafs John Gibson; Billy Harris

=== Free agent signings ===
May 11, 1981	From Cornell University (ECAC) Brock Tredway
July 8, 1981	From Colorado Rockies Bobby Sheehan
August 5, 1981	From Kingston Canadians (OHL) Howard Scruton
January 4, 1982	From Washington Capitals Alan Hangsleben
January 5, 1982	From Ohio State University (NCAA) Mike Blake
April 5, 1982	From University of North Dakota (WCHA) Phil Sykes

=== Waivers ===
October 5, 1981	From Hartford Whalers Al Sims
October 5, 1981	From Colorado Rockies Trevor Johansen
December 30, 1981	From Pittsburgh Penguins Paul Mulvey
February 19, 1982	To Toronto Maple Leafs Trevor Johansen
February 23, 1982	To Pittsburgh Penguins André St. Laurent

== Draft picks ==
Los Angeles's draft picks at the 1981 NHL entry draft held at the Montreal Forum in Montreal.

Round	#	Player	Nationality	College/Junior/Club team (League)
1	2	Doug Smith	Canada	Ottawa 67's (OMJHL)
2	39	Dean Kennedy	Canada	Brandon Wheat Kings (WHL)
4	81	Marty Dallman	Canada	Rensselaer Polytechnic Institute (ECAC)
6	123	Brad Thompson	Canada	London Knights (OMJHL)
7	134	Craig Hurley	Canada	Saskatoon Blades (WHL)
7	144	Peter Sawkins	United States	St. Paul Academy (USHS-MN)
8	165	Dan Brennan	Canada	University of North Dakota (WCHA)
9	186	Al Tuer	Canada	Regina Pats (WHL)
10	207	Jeff Baikie	Canada	Cornell University (ECAC)

== See also ==
- 1981–82 NHL season
