= 1981–82 Edmonton Oilers season =

NHL team season

1981–82 Edmonton Oilers
- Smythe Division champions
- Division: 1st Smythe
- Conference: 1st Campbell
- 1981–82 record: 48–17–15
- Home record: 31–5–4
- Road record: 17–12–11
- Goals for: 417
- Goals against: 295

Team information
- General manager: Glen Sather
- Coach: Glen Sather
- Captain: Lee Fogolin
- Alternate captains: None
- Arena: Northlands Coliseum
- Average attendance: 17,488 (99.99%)
- Minor league affiliate: Wichita Wind (CHL)

Team leaders
- Goals: Wayne Gretzky (92)
- Assists: Wayne Gretzky (120)
- Points: Wayne Gretzky (212)
- Penalty minutes: Dave Semenko (194)
- Plus/minus: Wayne Gretzky (+81)
- Wins: Grant Fuhr (28)
- Goals against average: Grant Fuhr (3.31)

The 1981–82 Edmonton Oilers season was the Oilers' third season in the NHL. The Oilers dramatically improved on their previous two seasons, as they finished with a franchise record 48 wins and 111 points, winning the Smythe Division (Note: With the NHL adopting a new playoff format with division-only brackets for the first two rounds, the Oilers elected to follow a convention of recognizing winning the Division Final as constituting a division championship. As a result, due to their early playoff exit the team did not raise a division championship banner.) for the first time in team history. The Oilers set an NHL record with 417 goals, the first time in NHL history that a team finished with over 400 goals.

Wayne Gretzky continued rewriting the record books, scoring an NHL record 92 goals, which included 50 goals in 39 games, also an NHL record. Gretzky's 212 points was also a record, and it was the first time in NHL history that a player had over 200 points, as he won his third Hart Memorial Trophy and his second Art Ross Trophy.

Mark Messier broke the 50 goal plateau for the first time in his career, while Glenn Anderson got 105 points. Paul Coffey led the defense with 89 points.

In goal, Grant Fuhr became the starting goalie, and would break the Oilers franchise record for wins in a season with 28. He also led the club with a 3.31 GAA and a .898 save percentage.

For the first time in their short NHL history, the Oilers entered the Stanley Cup playoffs as a clear favorite to make a deep postseason run. Going into the playoffs, the Oilers faced the Los Angeles Kings, and after splitting the first two games, the Oilers held a 5–0 lead on the Kings heading into the third period of game three. Los Angeles came back to tie the game at 5–5, before completing the comeback with an overtime goal, taking a 2–1 series lead. The game came to be known as the Miracle on Manchester. Edmonton came back to tie the series in game four, but the Kings eliminated Edmonton in game five, shocking the hockey world, and ending the Oilers season a lot sooner than expected.

== Season standings ==
Smythe Division
	GP	W	L	T	GF	GA	PTS
**Edmonton Oilers**	80	48	17	15	417	295	111
**Vancouver Canucks**	80	30	33	17	290	286	77
**Calgary Flames**	80	29	34	17	334	345	75
**Los Angeles Kings**	80	24	41	15	314	369	63
Colorado Rockies	80	18	49	13	241	362	49

Note: GP = Games played, W = Wins, L = Losses, T = Ties, Pts = Points, GF = Goals for, GA = Goals against
Note: Teams that qualified for the playoffs are highlighted in bold.

=== Record vs. opponents ===
Smythe Division record vs. opponents

==== Vs. Campbell Conference ====
**Vs. Smythe Division**

1981–82 NHL records
Team	**CGY**	**COL**	**EDM**	**LAK**	**VAN**	**Total**
Calgary	—	6−2	2−5−1	4−3−1	3−3−2	**15−13−4**
Colorado	2−6	—	2−5−1	2−4−2	2−4−2	**8−19−5**
Edmonton	5−2−1	5−2−1	—	5−1−2	5−2−1	**20−7−5**
Los Angeles	3−4−1	4−2−2	1−5−2	—	3−2−3	**11−13−8**
Vancouver	3−3−2	4−2−2	2−5−1	2−3−3	—	**11−13−8**

**Vs. Norris Division**

1981–82 NHL records
Team	**CHI**	**DET**	**MIN**	**STL**	**TOR**	**WIN**	**Total**
Calgary	0−2−1	1−1−1	0−1−2	1−2	1−0−2	1−2	**4−8−6**
Colorado	2−1	0−3	0−1−2	1−2	0−1−2	1−2	**4−10−4**
Edmonton	1−1−1	2−0−1	2−0−1	3−0	2−1	2−1	**12−3−3**
Los Angeles	0−3	2−1	0−2−1	2−1	1−2	0−3	**5−12−1**
Vancouver	2−1	1−1−1	1−1−1	1−2	2−0−1	2−1	**9−6−3**

**Vs. Wales Conference**

**Vs. Adams Division**

1981–82 NHL records
Team	**BOS**	**BUF**	**HFD**	**MTL**	**QUE**	**Total**
Calgary	1−1−1	2−0−1	2−1	1−2	3−0	**9−4−2**
Colorado	0−3	0−3	2−0−1	0−2−1	1−2	**3−10−2**
Edmonton	0−1−2	2−1	2−0−1	0−1−2	1−2	**5−5−5**
Los Angeles	0−3	1−2	0−2−1	1−2	1−0−2	**3−9−3**
Vancouver	1−2	1−1−1	2−0−1	1−2	1−1−1	**6−6−3**

**Vs. Patrick Division**

1981–82 NHL records
Team	**NYI**	**NYR**	**PHI**	**PIT**	**WSH**	**Total**
Calgary	0−1−2	0−2−1	0−3	1−0−2	0−3	**1−9−5**
Colorado	0−2−1	0−2−1	1−2	0−3	2−1	**3−10−2**
Edmonton	1−1−1	3−0	2−1	3−0	2−0−1	**11−2−2**
Los Angeles	2−1	1−2	0−2−1	1−1−1	1−1−1	**5−7−3**
Vancouver	1−2	0−3	2−0–1	0–2−1	1−1−1	**4–8–3**

== Schedule and results ==
1981–82 regular season
October: 9–4–0 (home: 5–1–0; road: 4–3–0)

Game	Date	Visitor	Score	Home	OT	Decision	Attendance	Record	Pts	Recap
1	October 7	Colorado Rockies	4 – 7	Edmonton Oilers		Moog	17,490	1–0–0	2	
2	October 9	Edmonton Oilers	2 – 6	Vancouver Canucks		Moog	13,122	1–1–0	2	
3	October 10	Edmonton Oilers	7 – 4	Los Angeles Kings		Low	8,839	2–1–0	4	
4	October 14	Winnipeg Jets	4 – 2	Edmonton Oilers		Fuhr	17,430	2–2–0	4	
5	October 16	Calgary Flames	4 – 8	Edmonton Oilers		Moog	17,490	3–2–0	6	
6	October 18	Edmonton Oilers	5 – 7	Chicago Black Hawks		Moog	12,395	3–3–0	6	
7	October 20	Edmonton Oilers	5 – 4	Calgary Flames		Low	7,226	4–3–0	8	
8	October 21	Hartford Whalers	2 – 5	Edmonton Oilers		Fuhr	17,490	5–3–0	10	
9	October 23	Pittsburgh Penguins	3 – 8	Edmonton Oilers		Fuhr	17,490	6–3–0	12	
10	October 24	Edmonton Oilers	3 – 1	Colorado Rockies		Low	9,283	7–3–0	14	
11	October 27	Edmonton Oilers	3 – 4	New York Islanders		Moog	14,594	7–4–0	14	
12	October 28	Edmonton Oilers	5 – 3	New York Rangers		Fuhr	17,322	8–4–0	16	
13	October 31	Quebec Nordiques	4 – 11	Edmonton Oilers		Low	17,490	9–4–0	18	

November: 8–2–3 (home: 5–1–0; road: 3–1–3)

Game	Date	Visitor	Score	Home	OT	Decision	Attendance	Record	Pts	Recap
14	November 4	Toronto Maple Leafs	4 – 6	Edmonton Oilers		Fuhr	17,490	10–4–0	20	
15	November 7	Colorado Rockies	5 – 4	Edmonton Oilers		Moog	17,490	10–5–0	20	
16	November 11	Edmonton Oilers	4 – 4	Hartford Whalers		Fuhr	11,101	10–5–1	21	
17	November 12	Edmonton Oilers	2 – 5	Boston Bruins		Low	10,666	10–6–1	21	
18	November 14	Edmonton Oilers	5 – 5	New York Islanders		Fuhr	15,143	10–6–2	22	
19	November 15	Edmonton Oilers	5 – 3	New York Rangers		Fuhr	17,418	11–6–2	24	
20	November 17	Edmonton Oilers	5 – 1	St. Louis Blues		Low	15,229	12–6–2	26	
21	November 19	Edmonton Oilers	2 – 2	Minnesota North Stars		Fuhr	15,784	12–6–3	27	
22	November 21	Vancouver Canucks	3 – 8	Edmonton Oilers		Fuhr	17,490	13–6–3	29	
23	November 23	Detroit Red Wings	4 – 8	Edmonton Oilers		Low	17,490	14–6–3	31	
24	November 25	Los Angeles Kings	4 – 11	Edmonton Oilers		Fuhr	17,490	15–6–3	33	
25	November 27	Chicago Black Hawks	1 – 8	Edmonton Oilers		Low	17,490	16–6–3	35	
26	November 29	Edmonton Oilers	10 – 2	Winnipeg Jets		Fuhr	15,756	17–6–3	37	

December: 8–3–3 (home: 6–1–0; road: 2–2–3)

Game	Date	Visitor	Score	Home	OT	Decision	Attendance	Record	Pts	Recap
27	December 1	Edmonton Oilers	3 – 3	Montreal Canadiens		Fuhr	18,094	17–6–4	38	
28	December 2	Edmonton Oilers	8 – 9	Quebec Nordiques		Low	15,230	17–7–4	38	
29	December 4	Vancouver Canucks	3 – 7	Edmonton Oilers		Fuhr	17,490	18–7–4	40	
30	December 5	Edmonton Oilers	3 – 3	Vancouver Canucks		Fuhr	15,271	18–7–5	41	
31	December 9	Edmonton Oilers	5 – 5	Los Angeles Kings		Fuhr	11,259	18–7–6	42	
32	December 13	New York Islanders	3 – 4	Edmonton Oilers		Fuhr	17,490	19–7–6	44	
33	December 16	Edmonton Oilers	7 – 4	Colorado Rockies		Low	6,168	20–7–6	46	
34	December 17	Edmonton Oilers	5 – 4	Calgary Flames		Low	7,226	21–7–6	48	
35	December 19	Minnesota North Stars	6 – 9	Edmonton Oilers		Moog	17,490	22–7–6	50	
36	December 20	Calgary Flames	7 – 5	Edmonton Oilers		Moog	17,490	22–8–6	50	
37	December 23	Vancouver Canucks	1 – 6	Edmonton Oilers		Fuhr	17,490	23–8–6	52	
38	December 27	Los Angeles Kings	3 – 10	Edmonton Oilers		Fuhr	17,490	24–8–6	54	
39	December 30	Philadelphia Flyers	5 – 7	Edmonton Oilers		Fuhr	17,490	25–8–6	56	
40	December 31	Edmonton Oilers	1 – 3	Vancouver Canucks		Low	16,413	25–9–6	56	

January: 8–3–4 (home: 6–0–1; road: 2–3–3)

Game	Date	Visitor	Score	Home	OT	Decision	Attendance	Record	Pts	Recap
41	January 2	Boston Bruins	4 – 4	Edmonton Oilers		Fuhr	17,490	25–9–7	57	
42	January 6	Colorado Rockies	3 – 5	Edmonton Oilers		Fuhr	17,490	26–9–7	59	
43	January 9	Calgary Flames	2 – 7	Edmonton Oilers		Fuhr	17,490	27–9–7	61	
44	January 10	Edmonton Oilers	1 – 5	Calgary Flames		Low	7,234	27–10–7	61	
45	January 13	Edmonton Oilers	6 – 6	Washington Capitals		Fuhr	3,284	27–10–8	62	
46	January 14	Edmonton Oilers	2 – 8	Philadelphia Flyers		Low	17,147	27–11–8	62	
47	January 16	Edmonton Oilers	1 – 7	Toronto Maple Leafs		Fuhr	16,360	27–12–8	62	
48	January 17	Edmonton Oilers	4 – 4	Detroit Red Wings		Fuhr	20,628	27–12–9	63	
49	January 20	St. Louis Blues	6 – 8	Edmonton Oilers		Fuhr	17,490	28–12–9	65	
50	January 22	Edmonton Oilers	4 – 3	Vancouver Canucks		Low	16,413	29–12–9	67	
51	January 24	Colorado Rockies	4 – 7	Edmonton Oilers		Fuhr	17,490	30–12–9	69	
52	January 26	Edmonton Oilers	6 – 4	St. Louis Blues		Low	17,533	31–12–9	71	
53	January 27	Edmonton Oilers	3 – 3	Chicago Black Hawks		Fuhr	17,401	31–12–10	72	
54	January 29	Buffalo Sabres	1 – 3	Edmonton Oilers		Fuhr	17,490	32–12–10	74	
55	January 31	Philadelphia Flyers	4 – 7	Edmonton Oilers		Fuhr	17,490	33–12–10	76	

February: 9–1–1 (home: 5–1–1; road: 4–0–0)

Game	Date	Visitor	Score	Home	OT	Decision	Attendance	Record	Pts	Recap
56	February 3	Montreal Canadiens	6 – 3	Edmonton Oilers		Fuhr	17,490	33–13–10	76	
57	February 6	Toronto Maple Leafs	1 – 5	Edmonton Oilers		Low	17,490	34–13–10	78	
58	February 7	New York Rangers	4 – 8	Edmonton Oilers		Fuhr	17,490	35–13–10	80	
59	February 12	Washington Capitals	3 – 5	Edmonton Oilers		Low	17,490	36–13–10	82	
60	February 14	Boston Bruins	2 – 2	Edmonton Oilers		Fuhr	17,490	36–13–11	83	
61	February 17	Minnesota North Stars	4 – 7	Edmonton Oilers		Fuhr	17,490	37–13–11	85	
62	February 19	Hartford Whalers	4 – 7	Edmonton Oilers		Low	17,490	38–13–11	87	
63	February 21	Edmonton Oilers	7 – 3	Detroit Red Wings		Low	20,270	39–13–11	89	
64	February 24	Edmonton Oilers	6 – 3	Buffalo Sabres		Fuhr	16,433	40–13–11	91	
65	February 27	Edmonton Oilers	4 – 1	Pittsburgh Penguins		Low	16,033	41–13–11	93	
66	February 28	Edmonton Oilers	4 – 1	Washington Capitals		Fuhr	18,130	42–13–11	95	

March: 5–4–4 (home: 3–1–2; road: 2–3–2)

Game	Date	Visitor	Score	Home	OT	Decision	Attendance	Record	Pts	Recap
67	March 2	Edmonton Oilers	3 – 3	Montreal Canadiens		Fuhr	18,101	42–13–12	96	
68	March 3	Edmonton Oilers	4 – 6	Quebec Nordiques		Low	15,290	42–14–12	96	
69	March 6	Edmonton Oilers	2 – 5	Colorado Rockies		Fuhr	16,384	42–15–12	96	
70	March 10	Edmonton Oilers	2 – 3	Los Angeles Kings		Fuhr	16,005	42–16–12	96	
71	March 12	Buffalo Sabres	3 – 2	Edmonton Oilers		Low	17,490	42–17–12	96	
72	March 13	Vancouver Canucks	3 – 5	Edmonton Oilers		Fuhr	17,490	43–17–12	98	
73	March 15	Los Angeles Kings	3 – 3	Edmonton Oilers		Fuhr	17,490	43–17–13	99	
74	March 17	Pittsburgh Penguins	4 – 10	Edmonton Oilers		Low	17,490	44–17–13	101	
75	March 19	Calgary Flames	3 – 3	Edmonton Oilers		Fuhr	17,490	44–17–14	102	
76	March 25	Edmonton Oilers	7 – 2	Calgary Flames		Fuhr	7,234	45–17–14	104	
77	March 26	Edmonton Oilers	6 – 6	Colorado Rockies		Low	16,384	45–17–15	105	
78	March 28	Edmonton Oilers	6 – 2	Los Angeles Kings		Fuhr	16,005	46–17–15	107	
79	March 31	Los Angeles Kings	3 – 7	Edmonton Oilers		Fuhr	17,490	47–17–15	109	

April: 1–0–0 (home: 1–0–0; road: 0–0–0)

Game	Date	Visitor	Score	Home	OT	Decision	Attendance	Record	Pts	Recap
80	April 4	Winnipeg Jets	1 – 2	Edmonton Oilers		Fuhr	17,490	48–17–15	111	

Legend: Win (2 points) Loss (0 points) Tie (1 point)

== Playoffs ==
1982 Stanley Cup playoffs
Smythe Division Semifinals vs. (S4) Los Angeles Kings – Kings win 3–2

Game	Date	Visitor	Score	Home	OT	Decision	Attendance	Series	Recap
1	April 7	Los Angeles Kings	10 – 8	Edmonton Oilers		Fuhr	17,490	0–1	
2	April 8	Los Angeles Kings	2 – 3	Edmonton Oilers	OT	Fuhr	17,490	1–1	
3	April 10	Edmonton Oilers	5 – 6	Los Angeles Kings	OT	Fuhr	16,005	1–2	
4	April 12	Edmonton Oilers	3 – 2	Los Angeles Kings		Fuhr	16,005	2–2	
5	April 13	Los Angeles Kings	7 – 4	Edmonton Oilers		Fuhr	17,490	2–3	

Legend: Win Loss

== Season stats ==
=== Scoring leaders ===
Player	GP	G	A	Pts	PIM
Wayne Gretzky	80	92	120	212	26
Glenn Anderson	80	38	67	105	71
Paul Coffey	80	29	60	89	106
Mark Messier	78	50	38	88	119
Jari Kurri	71	32	54	86	32

=== Goaltending ===
Player	GP	TOI	W	L	T	GA	SO	Save %	GAA
Grant Fuhr	48	2847	28	5	14	157	0	.898	3.31
Ron Low	29	1554	17	7	1	100	0	.874	3.86
Andy Moog	8	399	3	5	0	32	0	.842	4.81

== Playoff stats ==
=== Scoring leaders ===
Player	GP	G	A	Pts	PIM
Wayne Gretzky	5	5	7	12	8
Glenn Anderson	5	2	5	7	8
Jari Kurri	5	2	5	7	10
Risto Siltanen	5	3	2	5	10
Dave Lumley	5	2	1	3	21

=== Goaltending ===
Player	GP	TOI	W	L	GA	SO	Save %	GAA
Grant Fuhr	5	309	2	3	26	0	N/A	5.05

== Awards and records ==
=== Awards ===
- Art Ross Trophy: Wayne Gretzky
- Associated Press Athlete of the Year: Wayne Gretzky
  - Note: He would win that award on January 12, 1983
- Hart Memorial Trophy: Wayne Gretzky
- Lou Marsh Trophy: Wayne Gretzky
- Lester B. Pearson Award: Wayne Gretzky
- NHL Plus/Minus Award: Wayne Gretzky
- First NHL All-Star team: Wayne Gretzky and Mark Messier
- Second NHL All-Star team: Grant Fuhr and Paul Coffey

=== Records ===
- 417: An NHL team record for most goals in a single season.

- 400: A new NHL team record for most goals in a single season on March 26, 1982.

- 212: An NHL record for most points in a single season by Wayne Gretzky.

- 165: A new NHL record for most points in a single season by Wayne Gretzky on February 19, 1982.

- 200: First NHL player to hit a 200-point-milestone by Wayne Gretzky on March 25, 1982.
- 120: An NHL record for most assists in a single season by Wayne Gretzky.

- 110: A new NHL record for most assists in a single season by Wayne Gretzky on March 19, 1982.

- 92: An NHL record for most goals in a single season by Wayne Gretzky.

- 77: A new NHL record for most goals in a single season by Wayne Gretzky on February 24, 1982.

- 68: An NHL record for most even strength goals in a single season by Wayne Gretzky.

- 53: A new NHL record for most even strength goals in a single season by Wayne Gretzky on February 17, 1982.

=== Milestones ===
Regular Season
Player	Milestone	Reached
Walt Poddubny	1st NHL Game	October 7, 1981
Garry Unger	1,000th NHL PIM	October 7, 1981
Grant Fuhr	1st NHL Game	October 14, 1981
Mark Messier	100th NHL Point	October 14, 1981
Wayne Gretzky	200th NHL Assist	October 18, 1981
Doug Hicks	500th NHL Game	October 18, 1981
Grant Fuhr	1st NHL Win	October 21, 1981
Risto Siltanen	100th NHL Point	October 21, 1981
Grant Fuhr	1st NHL Assist; 1st NHL Point	October 23, 1981
Lee Fogolin	100th NHL Assist	October 24, 1981
Lee Fogolin	500th NHL Game	October 27, 1981
Wayne Gretzky	7th NHL Hat-trick; 2nd Four-Goal NHL Game	October 31, 1981
Matti Hagman	100th NHL Point	October 31, 1981
Paul Coffey	100th NHL Game	November 11, 1981
Dave Semenko	300th NHL PIM	November 12, 1981
Pat Hughes	300th NHL PIM	November 14, 1981
Lee Fogolin	700th NHL PIM	November 17, 1981
Stan Weir	300th NHL Point	November 19, 1981
Ken Berry	1st NHL Game	November 21, 1981
Glenn Anderson	3rd NHL Hat-trick	November 23, 1981
Todd Strueby	1st NHL Game	November 23, 1981
Wayne Gretzky	8th NHL Hat-trick; 3rd Four-Goal NHL Game	November 25, 1981
Marc Habscheid	1st NHL Game; 1st NHL Assist; 1st NHL Point	November 25, 1981
Marc Habscheid	1st NHL Goal	November 29, 1981
Pat Hughes	200th NHL Game	December 1, 1981
Mark Messier	2nd NHL Hat-trick	December 2, 1981
Ken Berry	1st NHL Assist; 1st NHL Point	December 4, 1981
Mike Forbes	1st NHL Goal	December 5, 1981
Dave Lumley	100th NHL Point	December 9, 1981
Jari Kurri	100th NHL Game	December 16, 1981
Jari Kurri	100th NHL Point	December 17, 1981
Wayne Gretzky	9th NHL Hat-trick	December 19, 1981
Dave Lumley	1st NHL Hat-trick	December 19, 1981
Kevin Lowe	200th NHL PIM	December 23, 1981
Ken Berry	1st NHL Goal	December 27, 1981
Wayne Gretzky	400th NHL Point; 10th NHL Hat-trick; 4th Four-Goal NHL Game	December 27, 1981
Doug Hicks	400th NHL PIM	December 27, 1981
Glenn Anderson	100th NHL Point	December 30, 1981
Wayne Gretzky	50th Goal in 39 Games; 11th NHL Hat-trick; 2nd Five-Goal NHL Game	December 30, 1981
Matti Hagman	200th NHL Game	December 30, 1981
Wayne Gretzky	200th NHL Game	January 2, 1982
Glenn Anderson	100th NHL Game	January 6, 1982
Paul Coffey	200th NHL PIM	January 14, 1982
Wayne Gretzky	12th NHL Hat-trick	January 20, 1982
Paul Coffey	100th NHL Point	January 26, 1982
Pat Hughes	100th NHL Point	January 29, 1982
Mark Messier	200th NHL Game	January 29, 1982
Wayne Gretzky	13th NHL Hat-trick	January 31, 1982
Kevin Lowe	200th NHL Game	February 6, 1982
Paul Coffey	2nd NHL Gordie Howe hat trick	February 12, 1982
Dave Hunter	200th NHL Game	February 12, 1982
Mark Messier	300th NHL PIM	February 12, 1982
Mark Messier	3rd NHL Hat-trick	February 17, 1982
Risto Siltanen	100th NHL Assist	February 17, 1982
Wayne Gretzky	14th NHL Hat-trick	February 19, 1982
Dave Hunter	100th NHL Point	February 21, 1982
Garry Unger	800th NHL Point	February 21, 1982
Wayne Gretzky	15th NHL Hat-trick; 4th NHL Natural Hat-trick	February 24, 1982
Wayne Gretzky	300th NHL Assist	March 10, 1982
Wayne Gretzky	16th NHL Hat-trick	March 17, 1982
Risto Siltanen	200th NHL Game	March 17, 1982
Wayne Gretzky	500th NHL Point	March 19, 1982
Laurie Boschman	3rd NHL Gordie Howe Hat-trick	March 25, 1982
Risto Siltanen	100th NHL PIM	March 26, 1982
Garry Lariviere	200th NHL Game	March 28, 1982
Dave Lumley	300th NHL PIM; 1st NHL Gordie Howe Hat-trick; 200th NHL Game	March 28, 1982
Dave Semenko	400th NHL PIM	March 28, 1982
Lee Fogolin	800th NHL PIM	March 31, 1982
Mark Messier	50th Goal in 79 Games	March 31, 1982

Playoffs
Player	Milestone	Reached
Grant Fuhr	1st NHL Game	April 7, 1982
Charlie Huddy	1st NHL Game; 1st NHL Goal; 1st NHL Point	April 7, 1982
Tom Roulston	1st NHL Game; 1st NHL Goal; 1st NHL Point	April 7, 1982
Risto Siltanen	1st NHL Assist	April 7, 1982
Grant Fuhr	1st NHL Win	April 8, 1982
Charlie Huddy	1st NHL Assist	April 8, 1982
Dave Hunter	1st NHL Assist	April 8, 1982
Dave Lumley	1st NHL Assist	April 8, 1982
Lee Fogolin	1st NHL Goal	April 10, 1982
Randy Gregg	1st NHL Assist; 1st NHL Point	April 10, 1982
Dave Hunter	50th NHL PIM	April 10, 1982
Garry Unger	100th NHL PIM	April 10, 1982
Grant Fuhr	1st NHL Assist; 1st NHL Point	April 12, 1982
Garry Unger	50th NHL Game	April 12, 1982
Randy Gregg	1st NHL Game	TBD

== Transactions ==
=== Trades ===
August 10, 1981	To Los Angeles Kings 5th-round pick in 1983 – Garry Galley	To Edmonton Oilers Jay McFarlane
August 21, 1981	To Minnesota North Stars Don Murdoch	To Edmonton Oilers Don Jackson; *3rd-round pick in 1982 – Wally Chapman
December 11, 1981	To New York Rangers Eddie Mio	To Edmonton Oilers Lance Nethery
March 9, 1982	To Colorado Rockies Stan Weir	To Edmonton Oilers Ed Cooper
March 9, 1982	To Toronto Maple Leafs Walt Poddubny; Phil Drouillard	To Edmonton Oilers Laurie Boschman
March 9, 1982	To Washington Capitals Doug Hicks	To Edmonton Oilers Todd Bidner

* Later traded to the Minnesota North Stars

=== Players acquired ===
Date	Player	Former team	Term
July 7, 1981	John Blum	Michigan Wolverines (NCAA)	1-year
October 2, 1981	Gord Garbutt	Wichita Wind (CHL)	
October 5, 1981	Brad Knelson	Wichita Wind (CHL)	
	Ray Cote	Calgary Wranglers (WHL)	

=== Players lost ===
Date	Player	New team
	Bryon Baltimore	Retired
	Bob Dupuis	Retired

=== Waivers ===
Date	Player	Team
October 5, 1981	Gary Edwards	to St. Louis Blues

=== Signings ===
Date	Player	Term
July 7, 1981	Matti Hagman	1-year
July 7, 1981	Dave Hunter	3-year

== Draft picks ==
Edmonton's draft picks at the 1981 NHL entry draft

Round	#	Player	Nationality	College/Junior/Club team (League)
1	8	Grant Fuhr	Canada	Victoria Cougars (WHL)
2	29	Todd Strueby	Canada	Regina Pats (WHL)
4	71	Paul Houck	Canada	Kelowna Buckaroos (BCJHL)
5	92	Phil Drouillard	Canada	Niagara Falls Flyers (OHL)
6	111	Steve Smith	Canada	London Knights (OHL)
7	132	Marc Habscheid	Canada	Saskatoon Blades (WHL)
8	155	Mike Sturgeon	Canada	Kelowna Buckaroos (BCJHL)
9	176	Miloslav Horava	Czechoslovakia	Kladno Poldi (Czechoslovak Extraliga)
10	197	Gord Sherven	Canada	Weyburn Red Wings (SJHL)
