= Strueby =

Strueby is a surname. Notable people with the surname include:

- Katherine Strueby (1908–1988), American-born British screenwriter
- Todd Strueby (born 1963), Canadian ice hockey player
