= 1981–82 Vancouver Canucks season =

12th season in franchise history

1981–82 Vancouver Canucks
- Campbell Conference champions
- Division: 2nd Smythe
- Conference: 4th Campbell
- 1981–82 record: 30–33–17
- Home record: 20–8–12
- Road record: 10–25–5
- Goals for: 290
- Goals against: 286

Team information
- General manager: Jake Milford
- Coach: Harry Neale (Oct–Mar); Roger Neilson (Mar–May)
- Captain: Kevin McCarthy
- Alternate captains: Stan Smyl; Harold Snepsts
- Arena: Pacific Coliseum
- Average attendance: 12,858
- Minor league affiliate: Dallas Black Hawks (CHL)

Team leaders
- Goals: Thomas Gradin (37)
- Assists: Thomas Gradin (49)
- Points: Thomas Gradin (86)
- Penalty minutes: Tiger Williams (341)
- Wins: Richard Brodeur (20)
- Goals against average: Richard Brodeur (3.35)

The 1981–82 Vancouver Canucks season was the team's 12th in the NHL. The Vancouver Canucks made their first appearance in the Stanley Cup Final, losing to the New York Islanders four games to none.

== Regular season ==
=== Final standings ===
Smythe Division
| | GP | W | L | T | GF | GA | PTS |
|---|---|---|---|---|---|---|---|
| **Edmonton Oilers** | 80 | 48 | 17 | 15 | 417 | 295 | 111 |
| **Vancouver Canucks** | 80 | 30 | 33 | 17 | 290 | 286 | 77 |
| **Calgary Flames** | 80 | 29 | 34 | 17 | 334 | 345 | 75 |
| **Los Angeles Kings** | 80 | 24 | 41 | 15 | 314 | 369 | 63 |
| Colorado Rockies | 80 | 18 | 49 | 13 | 241 | 362 | 49 |

Note: GP = Games played, W = Wins, L = Losses, T = Ties, Pts = Points, GF = Goals for, GA = Goals against
Note: Teams that qualified for the playoffs are highlighted in bold.

=== Record vs. opponents ===
Smythe Division record vs. opponents

==== Vs. Campbell Conference ====
**Vs. Smythe Division**

1981–82 NHL records
| Team | **CGY** | **COL** | **EDM** | **LAK** | **VAN** | **Total** |
|---|---|---|---|---|---|---|
| Calgary | — | 6−2 | 2−5−1 | 4−3−1 | 3−3−2 | **15−13−4** |
| Colorado | 2−6 | — | 2−5−1 | 2−4−2 | 2−4−2 | **8−19−5** |
| Edmonton | 5−2−1 | 5−2−1 | — | 5−1−2 | 5−2−1 | **20−7−5** |
| Los Angeles | 3−4−1 | 4−2−2 | 1−5−2 | — | 3−2−3 | **11−13−8** |
| Vancouver | 3−3−2 | 4−2−2 | 2−5−1 | 2−3−3 | — | **11−13−8** |

**Vs. Norris Division**

1981–82 NHL records
| Team | **CHI** | **DET** | **MIN** | **STL** | **TOR** | **WIN** | **Total** |
|---|---|---|---|---|---|---|---|
| Calgary | 0−2−1 | 1−1−1 | 0−1−2 | 1−2 | 1−0−2 | 1−2 | **4−8−6** |
| Colorado | 2−1 | 0−3 | 0−1−2 | 1−2 | 0−1−2 | 1−2 | **4−10−4** |
| Edmonton | 1−1−1 | 2−0−1 | 2−0−1 | 3−0 | 2−1 | 2−1 | **12−3−3** |
| Los Angeles | 0−3 | 2−1 | 0−2−1 | 2−1 | 1−2 | 0−3 | **5−12−1** |
| Vancouver | 2−1 | 1−1−1 | 1−1−1 | 1−2 | 2−0−1 | 2−1 | **9−6−3** |

**Vs. Wales Conference**

**Vs. Adams Division**

1981–82 NHL records
| Team | **BOS** | **BUF** | **HFD** | **MTL** | **QUE** | **Total** |
|---|---|---|---|---|---|---|
| Calgary | 1−1−1 | 2−0−1 | 2−1 | 1−2 | 3−0 | **9−4−2** |
| Colorado | 0−3 | 0−3 | 2−0−1 | 0−2−1 | 1−2 | **3−10−2** |
| Edmonton | 0−1−2 | 2−1 | 2−0−1 | 0−1−2 | 1−2 | **5−5−5** |
| Los Angeles | 0−3 | 1−2 | 0−2−1 | 1−2 | 1−0−2 | **3−9−3** |
| Vancouver | 1−2 | 1−1−1 | 2−0−1 | 1−2 | 1−1−1 | **6−6−3** |

**Vs. Patrick Division**

1981–82 NHL records
| Team | **NYI** | **NYR** | **PHI** | **PIT** | **WSH** | **Total** |
|---|---|---|---|---|---|---|
| Calgary | 0−1−2 | 0−2−1 | 0−3 | 1−0−2 | 0−3 | **1−9−5** |
| Colorado | 0−2−1 | 0−2−1 | 1−2 | 0−3 | 2−1 | **3−10−2** |
| Edmonton | 1−1−1 | 3−0 | 2−1 | 3−0 | 2−0−1 | **11−2−2** |
| Los Angeles | 2−1 | 1−2 | 0−2−1 | 1−1−1 | 1−1−1 | **5−7−3** |
| Vancouver | 1−2 | 0−3 | 2−0–1 | 0–2−1 | 1−1−1 | **4–8–3** |

== Schedule and results ==
1981–82 regular season
October: 4–5–3 (home: 3–1–1; road: 1–4–2)

| Game | Date | Visitor | Score | Home | Record | Points |
|---|---|---|---|---|---|---|
| 1 | October 6 | Colorado | 2 – 4 | Vancouver | 1–0–0 | 2 |
| 2 | October 8 | Vancouver | 1 – 1 | Calgary | 1–0–1 | 3 |
| 3 | October 9 | Edmonton | 2 – 6 | Vancouver | 2–0–1 | 5 |
| 4 | October 11 | Vancouver | 2 – 2 | Buffalo | 2–0–2 | 6 |
| 5 | October 14 | Vancouver | 1 – 2 | NY Rangers | 2–1–2 | 6 |
| 6 | October 15 | Vancouver | 1 – 4 | NY Islanders | 2–2–2 | 6 |
| 7 | October 17 | Vancouver | 4 – 10 | Montreal | 2–3–2 | 6 |
| 8 | October 19 | Vancouver | 3 – 6 | Quebec | 2–4–2 | 6 |
| 9 | October 23 | Hartford | 2 – 2 | Vancouver | 2–4–3 | 7 |
| 10 | October 25 | Pittsburgh | 6 – 4 | Vancouver | 2–5–3 | 7 |
| 11 | October 28 | Washington | 0 – 3 | Vancouver | 3–5–3 | 9 |
| 12 | October 31 | Vancouver | 8 – 4 | Philadelphia | 4–5–3 | 11 |

November: 7–5–1 (home: 4–1–1; road: 3–4–0)

| Game | Date | Visitor | Score | Home | Record | Points |
|---|---|---|---|---|---|---|
| 13 | November 1 | Vancouver | 1 – 3 | Detroit | 4–6–3 | 11 |
| 14 | November 4 | Vancouver | 4 – 1 | Hartford | 5–6–3 | 13 |
| 15 | November 5 | Vancouver | 1 – 2 | Boston | 5–7–3 | 13 |
| 16 | November 8 | Winnipeg | 1 – 5 | Vancouver | 6–7–3 | 15 |
| 17 | November 11 | Quebec | 5 – 6 | Vancouver | 7–7–3 | 17 |
| 18 | November 14 | Montreal | 4 – 1 | Vancouver | 7–8–3 | 17 |
| 19 | November 15 | Vancouver | 7 – 4 | Calgary | 8–8–3 | 19 |
| 20 | November 19 | Detroit | 3 – 8 | Vancouver | 9–8–3 | 21 |
| 21 | November 21 | Vancouver | 3 – 8 | Edmonton | 9–9–3 | 21 |
| 22 | November 22 | Colorado | 5 – 5 | Vancouver | 9–9–4 | 22 |
| 23 | November 25 | Chicago | 2 – 6 | Vancouver | 10–9–4 | 24 |
| 24 | November 27 | Vancouver | 6 – 3 | Colorado | 11–9–4 | 26 |
| 25 | November 28 | Vancouver | 2 – 3 | Los Angeles | 11–10–4 | 26 |

December: 3–7–4 (home: 3–2–4; road: 0–5–0)

| Game | Date | Visitor | Score | Home | Record | Points |
|---|---|---|---|---|---|---|
| 26 | December 2 | Minnesota | 0 – 5 | Vancouver | 12–10–4 | 28 |
| 27 | December 4 | Vancouver | 3 – 7 | Edmonton | 12–11–4 | 28 |
| 28 | December 5 | Edmonton | 3 – 3 | Vancouver | 12–11–5 | 29 |
| 29 | December 9 | NY Islanders | 3 – 4 | Vancouver | 13–11–5 | 31 |
| 30 | December 12 | Vancouver | 5 – 7 | Los Angeles | 13–12–5 | 31 |
| 31 | December 13 | Calgary | 7 – 6 | Vancouver | 13–13–5 | 31 |
| 32 | December 16 | Toronto | 6 – 6 | Vancouver | 13–13–6 | 32 |
| 33 | December 18 | Vancouver | 1 – 3 | Colorado | 13–14–6 | 32 |
| 34 | December 19 | Vancouver | 0 – 5 | St. Louis | 13–15–6 | 32 |
| 35 | December 22 | Minnesota | 4 – 4 | Vancouver | 13–15–7 | 33 |
| 36 | December 23 | Vancouver | 1 – 6 | Edmonton | 13–16–7 | 33 |
| 37 | December 26 | Los Angeles | 2 – 2 | Vancouver | 13–16–8 | 34 |
| 38 | December 29 | Boston | 5 – 3 | Vancouver | 13–17–8 | 34 |
| 39 | December 31 | Edmonton | 1 – 3 | Vancouver | 14–17–8 | 36 |

January: 3–7–3 (home: 3–2–3; road: 0–5–0)

| Game | Date | Visitor | Score | Home | Record | Points |
|---|---|---|---|---|---|---|
| 40 | January 2 | Vancouver | 2 – 5 | Washington | 14–18–8 | 36 |
| 41 | January 4 | Vancouver | 1 – 4 | NY Islanders | 14–19–8 | 36 |
| 42 | January 7 | Vancouver | 1 – 4 | NY Rangers | 14–20–8 | 36 |
| 43 | January 9 | Vancouver | 3 – 4 | Pittsburgh | 14–21–8 | 36 |
| 44 | January 10 | Vancouver | 2 – 3 | Chicago | 14–22–8 | 36 |
| 45 | January 13 | Calgary | 1 – 5 | Vancouver | 15–22–8 | 38 |
| 46 | January 15 | Los Angeles | 3 – 3 | Vancouver | 15–22–9 | 39 |
| 47 | January 17 | Pittsburgh | 3 – 3 | Vancouver | 15–22–10 | 40 |
| 48 | January 19 | St. Louis | 5 – 4 | Vancouver | 15–23–10 | 40 |
| 49 | January 22 | Edmonton | 4 – 3 | Vancouver | 15–24–10 | 40 |
| 50 | January 24 | Los Angeles | 5 – 5 | Vancouver | 15–24–11 | 41 |
| 51 | January 27 | Buffalo | 3 – 4 | Vancouver | 16–24–11 | 43 |
| 52 | January 30 | Philadelphia | 2 – 4 | Vancouver | 17–24–11 | 45 |

February: 7–3–3 (home: 3–1–2; road: 4–2–1)

| Game | Date | Visitor | Score | Home | Record | Points |
|---|---|---|---|---|---|---|
| 53 | February 2 | NY Rangers | 4 – 3 | Vancouver | 17–25–11 | 45 |
| 54 | February 3 | Toronto | 1 – 3 | Vancouver | 18–25–11 | 47 |
| 55 | February 6 | Vancouver | 4 – 5 | Los Angeles | 18–26–11 | 47 |
| 56 | February 10 | Vancouver | 4 – 1 | Toronto | 19–26–11 | 49 |
| 57 | February 11 | Vancouver | 4 – 4 | Detroit | 19–26–12 | 50 |
| 58 | February 13 | Vancouver | 3 – 2 | St. Louis | 20–26–12 | 52 |
| 59 | February 15 | Vancouver | 4 – 1 | Chicago | 21–26–12 | 54 |
| 60 | February 17 | Boston | 3 – 6 | Vancouver | 22–26–12 | 56 |
| 61 | February 20 | Hartford | 2 – 4 | Vancouver | 23–26–12 | 58 |
| 62 | February 23 | Calgary | 2 – 2 | Vancouver | 23–26–13 | 59 |
| 63 | February 25 | Vancouver | 4 – 11 | Calgary | 23–27–13 | 59 |
| 64 | February 26 | Vancouver | 4 – 3 | Colorado | 24–27–13 | 61 |
| 65 | February 28 | Philadelphia | 3 – 3 | Vancouver | 24–27–14 | 62 |

March: 4–6–3 (home: 3–1–1; road: 1–5–2)

| Game | Date | Visitor | Score | Home | Record | Points |
|---|---|---|---|---|---|---|
| 66 | March 3 | Vancouver | 2 – 3 | Colorado | 24–28–14 | 62 |
| 67 | March 6 | Vancouver | 1 – 3 | Minnesota | 24–29–14 | 62 |
| 68 | March 7 | Vancouver | 2 – 5 | Winnipeg | 24–30–14 | 62 |
| 69 | March 10 | Buffalo | 7 – 4 | Vancouver | 24–31–14 | 62 |
| 70 | March 11 | Vancouver | 3 – 6 | Calgary | 24–32–14 | 62 |
| 71 | March 13 | Vancouver | 3 – 5 | Edmonton | 24–33–14 | 62 |
| 72 | March 17 | Vancouver | 6 – 6 | Washington | 24–33–15 | 63 |
| 73 | March 18 | Vancouver | 4 – 2 | Montreal | 25–33–15 | 65 |
| 74 | March 20 | Vancouver | 3 – 3 | Quebec | 25–33–16 | 66 |
| 75 | March 24 | Colorado | 4 – 5 | Vancouver | 26–33–16 | 68 |
| 76 | March 27 | Calgary | 2 – 7 | Vancouver | 27–33–16 | 70 |
| 77 | March 28 | Winnipeg | 0 – 5 | Vancouver | 28–33–16 | 72 |
| 78 | March 31 | Colorado | 4 – 4 | Vancouver | 28–33–17 | 73 |

April: 2–0–0 (home: 1–0–0; road: 1–0–0)

| Game | Date | Visitor | Score | Home | Record | Points |
|---|---|---|---|---|---|---|
| 79 | April 3 | Vancouver | 6 – 0 | Los Angeles | 29–33–17 | 75 |
| 80 | April 4 | Los Angeles | 4 – 7 | Vancouver | 30–33–17 | 77 |

Legend: Win (2 points) Loss (0 points) Tie (1 point)

== Playoffs ==
1982 Stanley Cup playoffs
Smythe Division Semifinals vs. (S3) Calgary Flames – Canucks win 3–0

| Game | Date | Visitor | Score | Home | OT | Series |
|---|---|---|---|---|---|---|
| 1 | April 7 | Calgary | 3 – 5 | Vancouver | | Vancouver leads 1–0 |
| 2 | April 8 | Calgary | 1 – 2 | Vancouver | OT | Vancouver leads 2–0 |
| 3 | April 10 | Vancouver | 3 – 1 | Calgary | | Vancouver wins 3–0 |

Smythe Division Finals vs. (S4) Los Angeles Kings – Canucks win 4–1

| Game | Date | Visitor | Score | Home | OT | Series |
|---|---|---|---|---|---|---|
| 1 | April 15 | Los Angeles | 2 – 3 | Vancouver | | Vancouver leads 1–0 |
| 2 | April 16 | Los Angeles | 3 – 2 | Vancouver | OT | Series tied 1–1 |
| 3 | April 18 | Vancouver | 4 – 3 | Los Angeles | OT | Vancouver leads 2–1 |
| 4 | April 19 | Vancouver | 5 – 4 | Los Angeles | | Vancouver leads 3–1 |
| 5 | April 21 | Los Angeles | 2 – 5 | Vancouver | | Vancouver wins 4–1 |

Campbell Conference Finals vs. (N4) Chicago Black Hawks – Canucks win 4–1

| Game | Date | Visitor | Score | Home | OT | Series |
|---|---|---|---|---|---|---|
| 1 | April 27 | Vancouver | 2 – 1 | Chicago | OT | Vancouver leads 1–0 |
| 2 | April 29 | Vancouver | 1 – 4 | Chicago | | Series tied 1–1 |
| 3 | May 1 | Chicago | 3 – 4 | Vancouver | | Vancouver leads 2–1 |
| 4 | May 4 | Chicago | 3 – 5 | Vancouver | | Vancouver leads 3–1 |
| 5 | May 6 | Vancouver | 6 – 2 | Chicago | | Vancouver wins 4–1 |

Stanley Cup Finals vs. (P1) New York Islanders – Islanders win 4–0

| Game | Date | Visitor | Score | Home | OT | Series |
|---|---|---|---|---|---|---|
| 1 | May 8 | Vancouver | 5 – 6 | New York | OT | New York leads 1–0 |
| 2 | May 11 | Vancouver | 4 – 6 | New York | | New York leads 2–0 |
| 3 | May 13 | New York | 3 – 0 | Vancouver | | New York leads 3–0 |
| 4 | May 16 | New York | 3 – 1 | Vancouver | | New York wins 4–0 |

Legend: Win Loss

== Player statistics ==
=== Skaters ===
Note: GP = Games played; G = Goals; A = Assists; Pts = Points; PIM = Penalty minutes

| | | Regular season | | | | | Playoffs |
| Player | # | GP | G | A | Pts | PIM | GP | G | A | Pts | PIM |
|---|---|---|---|---|---|---|---|---|---|---|---|
| Thomas Gradin | 23 | 76 | 37 | 49 | 86 | 32 | 17 | 9 | 10 | 19 | 10 |
| Stan Smyl | 12 | 80 | 34 | 44 | 78 | 144 | 17 | 9 | 9 | 18 | 25 |
| Ivan Boldirev | 9 | 78 | 33 | 40 | 73 | 45 | 17 | 8 | 3 | 11 | 4 |
| Curt Fraser | 24 | 79 | 28 | 39 | 67 | 175 | 17 | 3 | 7 | 10 | 98 |
| Ivan Hlinka | 21 | 72 | 23 | 37 | 60 | 16 | 12 | 2 | 6 | 8 | 4 |
| Lars Molin | 26 | 72 | 15 | 31 | 46 | 10 | 17 | 2 | 9 | 11 | 7 |
| Kevin McCarthy | 25 | 71 | 6 | 39 | 45 | 84 | -- | -- | -- | -- | -- |
| Darcy Rota | 18 | 51 | 20 | 20 | 40 | 139 | 17 | 6 | 3 | 9 | 54 |
| Tiger Williams | 22 | 77 | 17 | 21 | 38 | 341 | 17 | 3 | 7 | 10 | 116 |
| Blair MacDonald | 14 | 59 | 18 | 15 | 33 | 20 | 3 | 0 | 0 | 0 | 0 |
| Lars Lindgren | 13 | 75 | 5 | 16 | 21 | 74 | 16 | 2 | 4 | 6 | 6 |
| Per-Olov Brasar | 16 | 53 | 6 | 12 | 18 | 6 | 6 | 0 | 0 | 0 | 0 |
| Gary Lupul | 7 | 41 | 10 | 7 | 17 | 26 | 10 | 2 | 3 | 5 | 4 |
| Ron Delorme | 19 | 59 | 9 | 8 | 17 | 177 | 15 | 0 | 2 | 2 | 31 |
| Doug Halward | 2 | 37 | 4 | 13 | 17 | 40 | 15 | 2 | 4 | 6 | 44 |
| Harold Snepsts | 27 | 68 | 3 | 14 | 17 | 153 | 17 | 0 | 4 | 4 | 50 |
| Rick Lanz | 4 | 39 | 3 | 11 | 14 | 48 | -- | -- | -- | -- | -- |
| Marc Crawford | 28 | 40 | 4 | 8 | 12 | 29 | 14 | 1 | 0 | 1 | 11 |
| Neil Belland | 15 | 28 | 3 | 6 | 9 | 16 | 17 | 1 | 7 | 8 | 16 |
| Anders Eldebrink | 10 | 38 | 1 | 8 | 9 | 21 | 13 | 0 | 0 | 0 | 10 |
| Tony Currie^{†} | – | 12 | 5 | 3 | 8 | 2 | 3 | 0 | 0 | 0 | 10 |
| Colin Campbell | 5 | 47 | 0 | 8 | 8 | 131 | 16 | 2 | 2 | 4 | 89 |
| Jerry Butler | – | 25 | 3 | 1 | 4 | 15 | -- | -- | -- | -- | -- |
| Moe Lemay | – | 5 | 1 | 2 | 3 | 0 | -- | -- | -- | -- | -- |
| Jim Nill^{†} | 8 | 8 | 1 | 2 | 3 | 5 | 16 | 4 | 3 | 7 | 67 |
| Jiri Bubla | 29 | 23 | 1 | 1 | 2 | 16 | -- | -- | -- | -- | -- |
| Richard Brodeur | 35 | 52 | 0 | 2 | 2 | 0 | 17 | 0 | 0 | 0 | 0 |
| Joe McDonnell | 3 | 7 | 0 | 1 | 1 | 12 | -- | -- | -- | -- | -- |
| Gerry Minor* | – | 13 | 0 | 1 | 1 | 6 | 9 | 1 | 3 | 4 | 17 |
| Andy Schliebener | 6 | 22 | 0 | 1 | 1 | 10 | 3 | 0 | 0 | 0 | 0 |
| Rick Heinz^{†} | 31 | 3 | 0 | 0 | 0 | 0 | -- | -- | -- | -- | -- |
| Garth Butcher | – | 5 | 0 | 0 | 0 | 9 | 1 | 0 | 0 | 0 | 0 |
| Glen Hanlon* | 1 | 28 | 0 | 0 | 0 | 0 | -- | -- | -- | -- | -- |

^{†}Denotes player spent time with another team before joining Vancouver. Stats reflect time with the Canucks only.

*Denotes player traded by Vancouver midway through the season. Stats reflect time with Canucks only.

=== Goaltenders ===
Note: GP = Games played; Min = Minutes; W = Wins; L = Losses; T = Ties; GA = Goals against; SO = Shutouts; GAA = Goals against average

| | | Regular season | | | | | | | | Playoffs |
| Player | # | GP | Min | W | L | T | GA | SO | GAA | GP | Min | W | L | GA | SO | GAA |
|---|---|---|---|---|---|---|---|---|---|---|---|---|---|---|---|---|
| Rick Heinz^{†} | 31 | 3 | 180 | 2 | 1 | 0 | 9 | 1 | 3.00 | -- | -- | -- | -- | -- | -- | -- |
| Richard Brodeur | 35 | 52 | 3010 | 20 | 18 | 12 | 168 | 2 | 3.35 | 17 | 1089 | 11 | 6 | 49 | 0 | 2.70 |
| Glen Hanlon* | 1 | 28 | 1610 | 8 | 14 | 5 | 106 | 1 | 3.95 | -- | -- | -- | -- | -- | -- | -- |

== Awards and records ==
=== Trophies and awards ===
- Cyclone Taylor Award (Canucks MVP): Richard Brodeur
- Cyrus H. McLean Trophy (Canucks Leading Scorer): Thomas Gradin
- Babe Pratt Trophy (Canucks Outstanding Defenceman): Harold Snespts
- Fred J. Hume Award (Canucks Unsung Hero): Lars Lindgren
- Most Exciting Player Award: Thomas Gradin
- Molson Cup (Most Three-Star selections): Richard Brodeur

=== Records achieved in the season ===
Note: Only records that stand as of 2007–08 are listed

==== Canucks team records ====
- Fewest losses at home: (8) – repeated in 1994–95
- Most ties at home: (12) – repeated in 1977–78
- Longest road losing streak: 12 games, November 28, 1981 – February 7, 1982

==== Canucks individual records ====
- Most points, rookie: Ivan Hlinka (60) – repeated in 1991–92 (Pavel Bure)
- Most goals, one game: Rosaire Paiement (4) – repeated eleven times

=== Records achieved in the playoffs ===
==== Canucks team records ====
- Most penalty minutes, one series: 285, 1982 Campbell Conference Finals versus Chicago Black Hawks
- Shortest overtime: 1:23, April 18, 1982, versus Los Angeles Kings (Colin Campbell)
- Most penalty minutes, one game: 106, April 29, 1982, versus Chicago Black Hawks
- Most penalty minutes, one game by opponent: 90, May 6, 1982, versus Chicago Black Hawks
- Most penalty minutes, one game by both teams: 188, April 29, 1982, versus Chicago Black Hawks
- Fewest shots on goal, one game: 16, April 19, 1982, versus Los Angeles Kings
- Most goals against, one game: 4, May 11, 1982, versus New York Islanders (repeated 5 times)
- Most shots on goal by opponent, one period: 19, April 29, 1982, versus Chicago Black Hawks (repeated in 1994)
- Fastest goal to start game: 0:08, April 7, 1982, versus Calgary Flames (Stan Smyl)
- Fastest goal to start period: 0:08, April 7, 1982, versus Calgary Flames (Stan Smyl)

==== Canucks individual records ====
- Most penalty minutes, one year: Tiger Williams (116)
- Longest assist streak: Lars Mollin (5)
- Most penalty minutes, one series: Tiger Williams versus Chicago Black Hawks (51)
- Fastest two goals in one period, opposition: Mike Bossy, New York Islanders, May 16, 1982 (3:00 in 2nd period)

== Transactions ==
The Canucks were involved in the following transactions during the 1981–82 season.

=== Trades ===
| July 15, 1981 | To Vancouver Canucks Compensation for signing Ivan Hlinka and Jiri Bubla | To Winnipeg Jets Brent Ashton 4th round pick (Tom Martin) in 1982 NHL entry draft |
| March 9, 1982 | To Vancouver Canucks Tony Currie Jim Nill Rick Heinz 4th round pick (Shawn Kilroy) in 1982 NHL entry draft | To St. Louis Blues Glen Hanlon |

== Draft picks ==
Vancouver's picks at the 1981 NHL entry draft. The draft was held at the Montreal Forum in Montreal.

| Round | # | Player | Nationality | College/Junior/Club team (League) |
|---|---|---|---|---|
| 1 | 10 | Garth Butcher (D) | Canada | Regina Pats (WHL) |
| 3 | 51 | Jean-Marc Lanthier (RW) | Canada | Sorel Black Hawks (QMJHL) |
| 4 | 73 | Wendell Young (G) | Canada | Kitchener Rangers (OHL) |
| 5 | 105 | Moe Lemay (F) | Canada | Ottawa 67's (OHL) |
| 6 | 115 | Stu Kulak | Canada | Victoria Cougars (WHL) |
| 7 | 136 | Bruce Holloway (D) | Canada | Regina Pats (WHL) |
| 8 | 157 | Petri Skriko (F) | Finland | SaiPa (Finland) |
| 9 | 178 | Frank Caprice (G) | Canada | London Knights (OHL) |
| 10 | 199 | Rejean Vignola (F) | Canada | Shawinigan Cataractes (QMJHL) |

== See also ==
- 1981-82 NHL season
