= 1981–82 Calgary Flames season =

NHL team season

1981–82 Calgary Flames
- Division: 3rd Smythe
- Conference: 5th Campbell
- 1981–82 record: 29–34–17
- Home record: 20–11–9
- Road record: 9–23–8
- Goals for: 334
- Goals against: 345

Team information
- General manager: Cliff Fletcher
- Coach: Al MacNeil
- Captain: Brad Marsh (Oct-Nov); Phil Russell (Nov-Apr)
- Alternate captains: None
- Arena: Stampede Corral
- Average attendance: 7,231
- Minor league affiliate: Oklahoma City Stars (CHL)

Team leaders
- Goals: Lanny McDonald (40)
- Assists: Guy Chouinard (57)
- Points: Mel Bridgman (87)
- Penalty minutes: Willi Plett (288)
- Wins: Pat Riggin (19)
- Goals against average: Pat Riggin (4.23)

The 1981–82 Calgary Flames season was the second season in Calgary and tenth for the Flames franchise in the National Hockey League (NHL). The follow-up to the Flames' first season in Calgary proved to be disappointing on the ice. Twenty-nine wins represented the Flames lowest total since the franchise's inaugural season in Atlanta. Despite the poor record, Calgary finished in third place in the newly organized Smythe Division, earning a playoff match-up against the Vancouver Canucks. The Flames returned to their Atlanta form, being swept out of the post-season in three straight games, as the Canucks began their run to the Stanley Cup Finals.

The 1981–82 season saw the Flames acquire Lanny McDonald from the Colorado Rockies, bringing the Hanna, Alberta product home. Sporting his trademark moustache, McDonald would spend his final seven seasons with the Flames, and remains an icon in Calgary. McDonald would score 34 of his 40 goals that season in a Flames uniform.

Pekka Rautakallio was the Flames representative at the 1982 All-Star Game.

== Regular season ==
=== Season standings ===
Smythe Division
	GP	W	L	T	GF	GA	PTS
**Edmonton Oilers**	80	48	17	15	417	295	111
**Vancouver Canucks**	80	30	33	17	290	286	77
**Calgary Flames**	80	29	34	17	334	345	75
**Los Angeles Kings**	80	24	41	15	314	369	63
Colorado Rockies	80	18	49	13	241	362	49

Note: GP = Games played, W = Wins, L = Losses, T = Ties, Pts = Points, GF = Goals for, GA = Goals against
Note: Teams that qualified for the playoffs are highlighted in bold.

=== Record vs. opponents ===
Smythe Division record vs. opponents

==== Vs. Campbell Conference ====
**Vs. Smythe Division**

1981–82 NHL records
Team	**CGY**	**COL**	**EDM**	**LAK**	**VAN**	**Total**
Calgary	—	6−2	2−5−1	4−3−1	3−3−2	**15−13−4**
Colorado	2−6	—	2−5−1	2−4−2	2−4−2	**8−19−5**
Edmonton	5−2−1	5−2−1	—	5−1−2	5−2−1	**20−7−5**
Los Angeles	3−4−1	4−2−2	1−5−2	—	3−2−3	**11−13−8**
Vancouver	3−3−2	4−2−2	2−5−1	2−3−3	—	**11−13−8**

**Vs. Norris Division**

1981–82 NHL records
Team	**CHI**	**DET**	**MIN**	**STL**	**TOR**	**WIN**	**Total**
Calgary	0−2−1	1−1−1	0−1−2	1−2	1−0−2	1−2	**4−8−6**
Colorado	2−1	0−3	0−1−2	1−2	0−1−2	1−2	**4−10−4**
Edmonton	1−1−1	2−0−1	2−0−1	3−0	2−1	2−1	**12−3−3**
Los Angeles	0−3	2−1	0−2−1	2−1	1−2	0−3	**5−12−1**
Vancouver	2−1	1−1−1	1−1−1	1−2	2−0−1	2−1	**9−6−3**

**Vs. Wales Conference**

**Vs. Adams Division**

1981–82 NHL records
Team	**BOS**	**BUF**	**HFD**	**MTL**	**QUE**	**Total**
Calgary	1−1−1	2−0−1	2−1	1−2	3−0	**9−4−2**
Colorado	0−3	0−3	2−0−1	0−2−1	1−2	**3−10−2**
Edmonton	0−1−2	2−1	2−0−1	0−1−2	1−2	**5−5−5**
Los Angeles	0−3	1−2	0−2−1	1−2	1−0−2	**3−9−3**
Vancouver	1−2	1−1−1	2−0−1	1−2	1−1−1	**6−6−3**

**Vs. Patrick Division**

1981–82 NHL records
Team	**NYI**	**NYR**	**PHI**	**PIT**	**WSH**	**Total**
Calgary	0−1−2	0−2−1	0−3	1−0−2	0−3	**1−9−5**
Colorado	0−2−1	0−2−1	1−2	0−3	2−1	**3−10−2**
Edmonton	1−1−1	3−0	2−1	3−0	2−0−1	**11−2−2**
Los Angeles	2−1	1−2	0−2−1	1−1−1	1−1−1	**5−7−3**
Vancouver	1−2	0−3	2−0–1	0–2−1	1−1−1	**4–8–3**

== Schedule and results ==
1981–82 regular season
October: 5–4–2 (home: 3–1–1; road: 2–3–1)

Game	Date	Visitor	Score	Home	Record	Pts
1	October 8	Vancouver	1 – 1	Calgary	0–0–1	1
2	October 10	Calgary	6 – 4	St.Louis	1–0–1	3
3	October 11	Calgary	0 – 3	Chicago	1–1–1	3
4	October 13	Calgary	3 – 4	Los Angeles	1–2–1	3
5	October 15	Winnipeg	5 – 4	Calgary	1–3–1	3
6	October 16	Calgary	4 – 8	Edmonton	1–4–1	3
7	October 20	Edmonton	5 – 4	Calgary	1–5–1	3
8	October 22	Pittsburgh	3 – 3	Calgary	1–5–2	4
9	October 24	Hartford	3 – 7	Calgary	2–5–2	6
10	October 28	Calgary	1 – 6	Minnesota	2–6–2	6
11	October 29	Calgary	4 – 12	Detroit	2–7–2	6

November: 5–5–4 (home: 5–2–2; road: 0–3–2)

Game	Date	Visitor	Score	Home	Record	Pts
12	November 1	Calgary	2 – 4	NY Rangers	2–8–2	6
13	November 3	Calgary	2 – 2	NY Islanders	2–8–3	7
14	November 4	Calgary	3 – 3	Buffalo	2–8–4	8
15	November 7	Calgary	2 – 4	St. Louis	2–9–4	8
16	November 8	Calgary	4 – 10	Chicago	2–10–4	8
17	November 10	St. Louis	7 – 0	Calgary	2–11–4	8
18	November 12	Quebec	2 – 3	Calgary	3–11–4	10
19	November 15	Vancouver	7 – 4	Calgary	3–12–4	10
20	November 17	Winnipeg	4 – 6	Calgary	4–12–4	12
21	November 19	Los Angeles	3 – 6	Calgary	5–12–4	14
22	November 21	Detroit	4 – 4	Calgary	5–12–5	15
23	November 24	Colorado	2 – 9	Calgary	6–12–5	17
24	November 26	Los Angeles	1 – 7	Calgary	7–12–5	19
25	November 28	Chicago	4 – 4	Calgary	7–12–6	20

December: 5–6–2 (home: 1–3–2; road: 4–3–0)

Game	Date	Visitor	Score	Home	Record	Pts
26	December 2	Calgary	3 – 9	Washington	7–13–6	20
27	December 3	Calgary	1 – 6	Philadelphia	7–14–6	20
28	December 5	Calgary	7 – 4	Montreal	8–14–6	22
29	December 8	Calgary	7 – 4	Quebec	9–14–6	24
30	December 12	NY Islanders	3 – 3	Calgary	9–14–7	25
31	December 13	Calgary	7 – 6	Vancouver	10–14–7	27
32	December 17	Edmonton	5 – 4	Calgary	10–15–7	27
33	December 19	Colorado	2 – 5	Calgary	11–15–7	29
34	December 20	Calgary	7 – 5	Edmonton	12–15–7	31
35	December 23	Minnesota	4 – 4	Calgary	12–15–8	32
36	December 26	Calgary	3 – 6	Colorado	12–16–8	32
37	December 28	Philadelphia	7 – 4	Calgary	12–17–8	32
38	December 30	Boston	4 – 2	Calgary	12–18–8	32

January: 7–4–4 (home: 5–0–1; road: 2–4–3)

Game	Date	Visitor	Score	Home	Record	Pts
39	January 2	Calgary	5 – 5	Los Angeles	12–18–9	33
40	January 5	Colorado	4 – 5	Calgary	13–18–9	35
41	January 7	Toronto	4 – 4	Calgary	13–18–10	36
42	January 9	Calgary	2 – 7	Edmonton	13–19–10	36
43	January 10	Edmonton	1 – 5	Calgary	14–19–10	38
44	January 13	Calgary	1 – 5	Vancouver	14–20–10	38
45	January 14	Los Angeles	2 – 5	Calgary	15–20–10	40
46	January 16	Pittsburgh	0 – 4	Calgary	16–20–10	42
47	January 17	Calgary	5 – 3	Colorado	17–20–10	44
48	January 20	Calgary	4 – 4	Toronto	17–20–11	45
49	January 21	Calgary	7 – 4	Detroit	18–20–11	47
50	January 23	Calgary	2 – 6	Montreal	18–21–11	47
51	January 25	Calgary	3 – 3	Boston	18–21–12	48
52	January 27	Calgary	1 – 3	Hartford	18–22–12	48
53	January 30	Buffalo	2 – 3	Calgary	19–22–12	50

February: 4–5–3 (home: 4–3–2; road: 0–2–1)

Game	Date	Visitor	Score	Home	Record	Pts
54	February 2	Montreal	5 – 3	Calgary	19–23–12	50
55	February 4	NY Rangers	4 – 4	Calgary	19–23–13	51
56	February 5	Calgary	4 – 6	Winnipeg	19–24–13	51
57	February 7	Toronto	2 – 8	Calgary	20–24–13	53
58	February 11	Washington	5 – 3	Calgary	20–25–13	53
59	February 13	Boston	3 – 6	Calgary	21–25–13	55
60	February 16	Hartford	2 – 7	Calgary	22–25–13	57
61	February 18	Minnesota	2 – 2	Calgary	22–25–14	58
62	February 20	Calgary	2 – 6	Los Angeles	22–26–14	58
63	February 23	Calgary	2 – 2	Vancouver	22–26–15	59
64	February 25	Vancouver	4 – 11	Calgary	23–26–15	61
65	February 27	Philadelphia	9 – 8	Calgary	23–27–15	61

March: 5–6–2 (home: 3–1–0; road: 2–5–2)

Game	Date	Visitor	Score	Home	Record	Pts
66	March 2	Calgary	3 – 6	NY Islanders	23–28–15	61
67	March 3	Calgary	2 – 4	NY Rangers	23–29–15	61
68	March 5	Calgary	6 – 8	Washington	23–30–15	61
69	March 7	Calgary	4 – 4	Pittsburgh	23–30–16	62
70	March 9	Calgary	9 – 4	Quebec	24–30–16	64
71	March 11	Vancouver	3 – 6	Calgary	25–30–16	66
72	March 13	Buffalo	1 – 4	Calgary	26–30–16	68
73	March 17	Calgary	4 – 9	Los Angeles	26–31–16	68
74	March 19	Calgary	3 – 3	Edmonton	26–31–17	69
75	March 20	Calgary	4 – 2	Colorado	27–31–17	71
76	March 25	Edmonton	7 – 2	Calgary	27–32–17	71
77	March 27	Calgary	2 – 7	Vancouver	27–33–17	71
78	March 30	Los Angeles	5 – 7	Calgary	28–33–17	73

April: 1–1–0 (home: 1–0–0; road: 0–1–0)

Game	Date	Visitor	Score	Home	Record	Pts
79	April 1	Colorado	0 – 11	Calgary	29–33–17	75
80	April 3	Calgary	1 – 3	Colorado	29–34–17	75

Legend: Win (2 points) Loss (0 points) Tie (1 point)

== Playoffs ==
1982 Stanley Cup playoffs
Smythe Division Semifinals vs. Vancouver Canucks – Canucks win 3–0

Game	Date	Visitor	Score	Home	OT	Series
1	April 7	Calgary	3 – 5	Vancouver		Vancouver leads 1–0
2	April 8	Calgary	1 – 2	Vancouver	OT	Vancouver leads 2–0
3	April 10	Vancouver	3 – 1	Calgary		Vancouver wins 3–0

Legend: Win Loss

== Player statistics ==
=== Skaters ===
Note: GP = Games played; G = Goals; A = Assists; Pts = Points; PIM = Penalty minutes

		Regular season					Playoffs
Player	#	GP	G	A	Pts	PIM	GP	G	A	Pts	PIM
Guy Chouinard	16	64	23	57	80	12	3	0	1	1	6
Mel Bridgman^{†}	26	63	26	49	75	94	3	2	0	2	14
Pekka Rautakallio	4	80	17	51	68	40	3	0	0	0	0
Lanny McDonald^{†}	9	55	34	33	67	37	3	0	1	1	6
Jim Peplinski	24	74	30	37	67	115	3	1	0	1	13
Kevin LaVallee	15	75	32	29	61	30	3	0	0	0	7
Paul Reinhart	23	62	13	48	61	17	3	0	1	1	2
Willi Plett	25	78	21	36	57	288	3	1	2	3	39
Kent Nilsson	14	41	26	29	55	8	3	0	3	3	2
Jamie Hislop	17	80	16	25	41	35	3	0	0	0	0
Phil Russell	5	71	4	25	29	110	3	0	1	1	2
Gary McAdam^{†}	28	46	12	15	27	18	3	0	0	0	0
Denis Cyr	9/12	45	12	10	22	13	–	–	–	–	-
Dan Labraaten	21	43	10	12	22	6	3	0	0	0	0
Bob Murdoch	20	73	3	17	20	76	3	0	0	0	0
Don Lever^{‡}	12	23	8	11	19	6	–	–	–	–	-
Steve Konroyd	3	63	3	14	17	78	3	0	0	0	12
Bill Clement	10	69	4	12	16	28	3	0	0	0	2
Charlie Bourgeois	2	54	2	13	15	112	3	0	0	0	7
Bob MacMillan^{‡}	11	23	4	7	11	14	–	–	–	–	-
Eric Vail^{‡}	27	6	4	1	5	0	–	–	–	–	-
Kari Eloranta^{‡}	8	10	0	5	5	14	–	–	–	–	-
Pat Riggin	1	52	0	5	5	4	3	0	0	0	0
Dave Hindmarch	18	9	3	0	3	0	–	–	–	–	-
Bobby Gould^{‡}	19	16	3	0	3	4	–	–	–	–	-
Eddy Beers	27	5	1	1	2	21	–	–	–	–	-
Mike Dwyer	29	5	0	2	2	0	–	–	–	–	-
Gord Wappel	21	11	1	0	1	6	–	–	–	–	-
Carl Mokosak	19	1	0	1	1	0	–	–	–	–	-
Brad Marsh^{‡}	22	17	0	1	1	10	–	–	–	–	-
Rejean Lemelin	31	34	0	1	1	0	–	–	–	–	-
Randy Turnbull	22	1	0	0	0	2	–	–	–	–	-
Bruce Eakin	19	1	0	0	0	0	–	–	–	–	-
Bobby Lalonde	11	1	0	0	0	0	–	–	–	–	-
Tim Hunter	19	2	0	0	0	9	–	–	–	–	-
Al MacInnis	11	2	0	0	0	0	–	–	–	–	-
Pat Ribble^{†}	22/8	3	0	0	0	2	–	–	–	–	-
Randy Holt^{‡}	7	8	0	0	0	9	–	–	–	–	-

^{†}Denotes player spent time with another team before joining Calgary. Stats reflect time with the Flames only.
^{‡}Traded mid-season.

=== Goaltenders ===
Note: GP = Games played; TOI = Time on ice (minutes); W = Wins; L = Losses; OT = Overtime/shootout losses; GA = Goals against; SO = Shutouts; GAA = Goals against average

		Regular season								Playoffs
Player	#	GP	TOI	W	L	T	GA	SO	GAA	GP	TOI	W	L	GA	SO	GAA
Pat Riggin	1	52	2934	19	19	11	207	2	4.23	3	194	0	3	10	0	3.09
Rejean Lemelin	31	34	1866	10	15	6	135	0	4.34	–	–	–	–	–	–	-.--

== Transactions ==
The Flames were involved in the following transactions during the 1981–82 season.

=== Trades ===
November 10, 1981	To Calgary Flames Gary McAdam	To Detroit Red Wings Eric Vail
November 11, 1981	To Calgary Flames Mel Bridgman	To Philadelphia Flyers Brad Marsh
November 25, 1981	To Calgary Flames Lanny McDonald; 4th round pick in 1983 entry draft (traded to New York Islanders; Islanders selected Mikko Makela)	To Colorado Rockies Don Lever; Bob MacMillan
November 25, 1981	To Calgary Flames Pat Ribble; 2nd round pick in 1983 entry draft (traded to Montreal Canadiens; Todd Francis)	To Washington Capitals Bobby Gould; Randy Holt
March 8, 1982	To Calgary Flames Future Considerations	To St. Louis Blues Kari Eloranta

=== Free agents ===
Player	Former team
LW Gord Hampson	University of Michigan (NCAA)
LW Carl Mokosak	Brandon Wheat Kings (WHL)
D Kari Eloranta	Leksands IF (Elitserien)
C Bobby Lalonde	Boston Bruins
C Kari Jalonen	Kärpät (SM-liiga)
LW Eddy Beers	University of Denver (NCAA)

Player	New team
RW Dave Gorman	Buffalo Sabres

== Draft picks ==
Calgary's picks at the 1981 NHL entry draft, held in Montreal.

Rnd	Pick	Player	Nationality	Position	Team (league)	NHL statistics				
Rnd	Pick	Player	Nationality	Position	Team (league)	GP	G	A	Pts	PIM
1	15	Al MacInnis	Canada	D	Kitchener Rangers (OHL)	1416	340	934	1274	1501
3	56	Mike Vernon	Canada	G	Calgary Wranglers (WHL)	781	385–273–92, 3.00 GAA			
4	78	Peter Madach	Sweden	C	N/A					
5	99	Mario Simioni	Canada	F	Toronto Marlboros (OHL)					
6	120	Todd Hooey	Canada	F	Windsor Spitfires (OHL)					
7	141	Rick Heppner	United States	D	N/A					
8	162	Dale DeGray	Canada	D	Oshawa Generals (OHL)	153	18	47	65	195
9	183	George Boudreau	United States	D	N/A					
10	204	Bruce Eakin	Canada	F	Saskatoon Blades (OHL)	13	2	2	4	4

== See also ==
- 1981–82 NHL season
