= Todd Strueby =

Canadian ice hockey player

- Born: June 15, 1963 (age 62) Lanigan, Saskatchewan, Canada
- Height: 6 ft 2 in (188 cm)
- Weight: 189 lb (86 kg; 13 st 7 lb)
- Position: Centre
- Shot: Left
- Played for: Edmonton Oilers
- NHL draft: 29th overall, 1981; Edmonton Oilers
- Playing career: 1983–1993

Todd Kenneth Strueby (born June 15, 1963) is a Canadian former professional ice hockey centre who played most of his career in the minor leagues.

Strueby was born in Lanigan, Saskatchewan and raised in Humboldt, Saskatchewan. He played junior hockey for the Regina Pats and Saskatoon Blades of the Western Hockey League (WHL). He played for the Canada national junior hockey team at the 1982 World Junior Ice Hockey Championships, where Canada won the gold medal.

Strueby was selected in the second round of the 1981 NHL entry draft by the Edmonton Oilers. He made his National Hockey League debut in the 1981–82 season, appearing in three games before returning to the Blades. He was also called up for one game in the 1982–83 season, his last in the WHL. Strueby turned professional for the 1983–84 season but spent almost that entire season playing for the minor league Moncton Alpines. His single game played for the Oilers that season would be his last in the NHL.

Strueby spent the next four seasons playing for the Nova Scotia Oilers in the American Hockey League and for the Muskegon Lumberjacks and Fort Wayne Komets of the International Hockey League. He spent the next three seasons (1988–91) playing for the Canadian national team and for EHC Freiburg in the German ice hockey Bundesliga. He returned to the IHL for the 1991–92 season, playing for the Salt Lake Golden Eagles, and he retired in 1993.

== Career statistics ==
			Regular season					Playoffs
Season	Team	League	GP	G	A	Pts	PIM	GP	G	A	Pts	PIM
1979–80	Notre Dame Hounds Midget AAA	SMHL	58	44	61	105	112	—	—	—	—	—
1980–81	Regina Pats	WHL	71	18	27	45	99	11	3	6	9	19
1981–82	Saskatoon Blades	WHL	61	60	58	118	160	5	2	2	4	6
1981–82	Edmonton Oilers	NHL	3	0	0	0	0	—	—	—	—	—
1982–83	Saskatoon Blades	WHL	65	40	70	110	119	6	3	3	6	19
1982–83	Edmonton Oilers	NHL	1	0	0	0	0	—	—	—	—	—
1983–84	Edmonton Oilers	NHL	1	0	1	1	0	—	—	—	—	—
1983–84	Moncton Alpines	AHL	72	17	25	42	38	—	—	—	—	—
1984–85	Nova Scotia Oilers	AHL	38	2	3	5	29	—	—	—	—	—
1984–85	Muskegon Lumberjacks	IHL	27	19	12	31	55	17	4	10	14	27
1985–86	Muskegon Lumberjacks	IHL	58	25	40	65	191	14	7	5	12	51
1986–87	Muskegon Lumberjacks	IHL	82	28	41	69	208	13	4	6	10	53
1987–88	Fort Wayne Komets	IHL	68	29	27	56	211	4	0	0	0	14
1989–90	EHC Freiburg	Germany	25	13	12	25	76	—	—	—	—	—
1990–91	EHC Freiburg	Germany	7	0	3	3	10	—	—	—	—	—
1991–92	Salt Lake Golden Eagles	IHL	61	15	16	31	71	3	1	0	1	6
NHL totals			5	0	1	1	2	—	—	—	—	—
AHL totals			110	19	28	47	67	—	—	—	—	—
IHL totals			296	116	136	252	736	51	16	21	37	151

== Awards ==
- WHL First All-Star Team – 1982
- WHL Second All-Star Team – 1983
