= Mark Botell =

Canadian ice hockey player

- Born: August 27, 1961 (age 64) Scarborough, Ontario, Canada
- Height: 6 ft 4 in (193 cm)
- Weight: 220 lb (100 kg; 15 st 10 lb)
- Position: Defence
- Shot: Left
- Played for: Philadelphia Flyers
- NHL draft: 168th overall, 1980; Philadelphia Flyers
- Playing career: 1981–1986

Mark Botell (born August 27, 1961) is a Canadian retired professional ice hockey player.

Botell was born in Scarborough, Ontario. As a youth, he played in the 1974 Quebec International Pee-Wee Hockey Tournament with a minor ice hockey team from Wexford, Toronto. He played in 32 National Hockey League (NHL) games with the Philadelphia Flyers during the 1981–82 season.

== Career statistics ==
			Regular season					Playoffs
Season	Team	League	GP	G	A	Pts	PIM	GP	G	A	Pts	PIM
1977–78	Wexford Raiders	OPJHL	73	15	28	43	168	—	—	—	—	—
1978–79	Niagara Falls Flyers	OMJHL	55	2	8	10	122	14	2	1	3	6
1979–80	Niagara Falls Flyers	OMJHL	20	2	5	7	11	—	—	—	—	—
1979–80	Windsor Spitfires	OMJHL	2	0	0	0	0	—	—	—	—	—
1979–80	Brantford Alexanders	OMJHL	15	2	3	5	24	11	1	5	6	10
1980–81	Brantford Alexanders	OHL	58	11	20	31	143	4	0	2	2	12
1980–81	Maine Mariners	AHL	2	0	1	1	0	20	4	4	8	36
1981–82	Philadelphia Flyers	NHL	32	4	10	14	31	—	—	—	—	—
1981–82	Maine Mariners	AHL	42	3	14	17	41	3	0	1	1	4
1982–83	Maine Mariners	AHL	30	1	4	5	26	—	—	—	—	—
1982–83	Toledo Goaldiggers	IHL	24	6	14	20	43	—	—	—	—	—
1983–84	Montana Magic	CHL	2	0	0	0	2	—	—	—	—	—
1983–84	Toledo Goaldiggers	IHL	78	16	27	43	164	9	2	1	3	6
1984–85	Peoria Rivermen	IHL	70	6	21	27	77	20	1	3	4	35
1985–86	St. Catharines Saints	AHL	11	1	3	4	17	12	1	3	4	8
1985–86	Panasonic 's-Hertogenbosch	Netherlands	—	—	—	—	—	—	—	—	—	—
NHL totals			32	4	10	14	31	—	—	—	—	—
IHL totals			172	28	62	90	284	29	3	4	7	41
