= Rich Costello =

American ice hockey player (born 1963)

- Born: June 27, 1963 (age 62) Framingham, Massachusetts, U.S.
- Height: 6 ft 0 in (183 cm)
- Weight: 175 lb (79 kg; 12 st 7 lb)
- Position: Center
- Shot: Right
- Played for: Toronto Maple Leafs; Schwenninger ERC
- National team: United States
- NHL draft: 37th overall, 1981; Philadelphia Flyers
- Playing career: 1984–1990

Richard Anthony Costello (born June 27, 1963) is an American former professional ice hockey player. He played 12 games in the National Hockey League with the Toronto Maple Leafs between 1984 and 1986. The rest of his career, which lasted from 1983 to 1991, was mainly spent in the minor leagues.

== Biography ==
As a youth, Costello played in the 1976 Quebec International Pee-Wee Hockey Tournament with a minor ice hockey team from Boston.

He was drafted by the Philadelphia Flyers in 1981 NHL entry draft, but traded to the Toronto Maple Leafs in 1982 for Darryl Sittler. Costello was born in Framingham, Massachusetts, but grew up in Natick, Massachusetts.

Costello spent part of the 1983-84 season with the United States National Team. He spent the following three years in the Leafs organisation, in which he played a total of 12 games in the NHL, but spent most of his time in the American Hockey League. He later played professionally in Finland, Germany and Switzerland.

== Career statistics ==
=== Regular season and playoffs ===
			Regular season					Playoffs
Season	Team	League	GP	G	A	Pts	PIM	GP	G	A	Pts	PIM
1977–78	Natick High School	HS-MA	—	—	—	—	—	—	—	—	—	—
1978–79	Natick High School	HS-MA	18	26	32	58	—	—	—	—	—	—
1979–80	Natick High School	HS-MA	18	30	36	66	—	—	—	—	—	—
1980–81	Pickering Panthers	MetJBHL	40	18	24	42	35	—	—	—	—	—
1981–82	Providence College	ECAC	32	11	16	27	39	—	—	—	—	—
1982–83	Providence College	ECAC	43	19	26	45	60	—	—	—	—	—
1983–84	Toronto Maple Leafs	NHL	10	2	1	3	2	—	—	—	—	—
1983–84	St. Catharines Saints	AHL	20	0	0	0	12	4	1	0	1	0
1983–84	American National Team	Intl	38	7	19	26	31	—	—	—	—	—
1984–85	St. Catharines Saints	AHL	80	8	6	14	45	—	—	—	—	—
1985–86	Toronto Maple Leafs	NHL	2	0	1	1	9	—	—	—	—	—
1985–86	St. Catharines Saints	AHL	76	18	22	40	87	13	3	6	9	30
1986–87	Newmarket Saints	AHL	48	6	11	17	53	—	—	—	—	—
1987–88	SaiPa	FIN-2	26	10	11	21	46	—	—	—	—	—
1987–88	Utica Devils	AHL	3	1	1	2	2	—	—	—	—	—
1988–89	Schwenninger ERC	GER	11	6	8	14	14	—	—	—	—	—
1989–90	EC Ratingen	GER-2	29	26	30	56	26	—	—	—	—	—
1989–90	HC Davos	NLB	7	4	11	15	4	—	—	—	—	—
1990–91	Albany Choppers	IHL	9	1	3	4	14	—	—	—	—	—
AHL totals			227	33	40	73	199	17	4	6	10	30
NHL totals			12	2	2	4	2	—	—	—	—	—
