= Ed Cooper (ice hockey) =

Canadian ice hockey player

- Born: August 28, 1960 (age 65) Loon Lake, Saskatchewan, Canada
- Height: 5 ft 10 in (178 cm)
- Weight: 188 lb (85 kg; 13 st 6 lb)
- Position: Left wing
- Shot: Left
- Played for: Colorado Rockies
- NHL draft: 85th overall, 1980; Colorado Rockies
- Playing career: 1980–1986

Edward William Cooper (born August 28, 1960) is a Canadian former professional ice hockey forward who played 49 games in the National Hockey League for the Colorado Rockies. Cooper was born in Loon Lake, Saskatchewan, but grew up in Biggar, Saskatchewan.

== Career statistics ==
			Regular season					Playoffs
Season	Team	League	GP	G	A	Pts	PIM	GP	G	A	Pts	PIM
1977–78	Estevan Bruins	SJHL	49	30	37	67	137	—	—	—	—	—
1977–78	New Westminster Bruins	WCHL	1	0	0	0	0	—	—	—	—	—
1978–79	Portland Winterhawks	WHL	66	8	17	25	61	25	6	4	10	15
1979–80	Portland Winterhawks	WHL	44	35	43	78	76	8	5	2	7	21
1980–81	Colorado Rockies	NHL	47	7	7	14	46	—	—	—	—	—
1980–81	Fort Worth Texans	CHL	26	6	9	15	21	—	—	—	—	—
1981–82	Colorado Rockies	NHL	2	1	0	1	0	—	—	—	—	—
1981–82	Fort Worth Texans	CHL	47	12	25	37	26	—	—	—	—	—
1981–82	Wichita Wind	CHL	4	1	4	5	0	6	1	1	2	0
1983–84	Muskegon Mohawks	IHL	5	1	3	4	0	—	—	—	—	—
1984–85	Nelson Maple Leafs	WIHL	10	7	9	16	4	—	—	—	—	—
1985–86	Nelson Maple Leafs	WIHL	27	22	27	49	47	—	—	—	—	—
1986–87	Esbjerg Energy	Denmark	22	16	18	34	—	—	—	—	—	—
NHL totals			49	8	7	15	46	—	—	—	—	—
