= Smythe Division =

Division of the National Hockey League before 1993

- Conference: Clarence Campbell Conference
- League: National Hockey League
- Sport: Ice hockey
- Founded: 1974
- Folded: 1993
- Replaced by: Pacific Division
- Most titles: Edmonton Oilers (6)

The National Hockey League's Smythe Division was formed in 1974 as part of the Clarence Campbell Conference. The division existed for 19 seasons until 1993. It was named after Conn Smythe, who was a longtime owner, general manager, and head coach in the league. It is the forerunner of the NHL's Northwest Division and Pacific Division.

== Division lineups ==
=== 1974–1976 ===
1974–76 Smythe Division
- Chicago Black Hawks
- Kansas City Scouts
- Minnesota North Stars
- St. Louis Blues
- Vancouver Canucks

==== Changes from the 1973–74 season ====
- The Smythe Division is formed as a result of NHL realignment
- The Vancouver Canucks come from the East Division
- The Chicago Black Hawks, Minnesota North Stars, and St. Louis Blues come from the West Division
- The Kansas City Scouts are added as an expansion team

=== 1976–1978 ===
1976–78 Smythe Division
- Chicago Black Hawks
- Colorado Rockies
- Minnesota North Stars
- St. Louis Blues
- Vancouver Canucks

==== Changes from the 1975–76 season ====
- The Kansas City Scouts move to Denver, Colorado, to become the Colorado Rockies

=== 1978–1979 ===
1978–79 Smythe Division
- Chicago Black Hawks
- Colorado Rockies
- St. Louis Blues
- Vancouver Canucks

==== Changes from the 1977–78 season ====
- The Minnesota North Stars merge with the Cleveland Barons. The new franchise continues as the Minnesota North Stars but assumes the Barons' place in the Adams Division

=== 1979–1981 ===
1979–81 Smythe Division
- Chicago Black Hawks
- Colorado Rockies
- Edmonton Oilers
- St. Louis Blues
- Vancouver Canucks
- Winnipeg Jets

==== Changes from the 1978–79 season ====
- The Edmonton Oilers and Winnipeg Jets are granted entry into the NHL from the World Hockey Association (WHA)

=== 1981–1982 ===
1981–82 Smythe Division
- Calgary Flames
- Colorado Rockies
- Edmonton Oilers
- Los Angeles Kings
- Vancouver Canucks

==== Changes from the 1980–81 season ====
- The Chicago Black Hawks, St. Louis Blues, and Winnipeg Jets move to the Norris Division
- The Calgary Flames come from the Patrick Division
- The Los Angeles Kings come from the Norris Division

=== 1982–1991 ===
1982–91 Smythe Division
- Calgary Flames
- Edmonton Oilers
- Los Angeles Kings
- Vancouver Canucks
- Winnipeg Jets

==== Changes from the 1981–82 season ====
- The Colorado Rockies move to the Patrick Division as the New Jersey Devils
- The Winnipeg Jets come from the Norris Division

=== 1991–1993 ===
1991–93 Smythe Division
- Calgary Flames
- Edmonton Oilers
- Los Angeles Kings
- San Jose Sharks
- Vancouver Canucks
- Winnipeg Jets

==== Changes from the 1990–91 season ====
- The San Jose Sharks are added as an expansion team

=== After the 1992–93 season ===
The league was reformatted into two conferences with two divisions each:

- Eastern Conference
  - Atlantic Division
  - Northeast Division
- Western Conference
  - Central Division
  - Pacific Division

== Season results ==
^{(#)}	Denotes team that won the Stanley Cup
^{(#)}	Denotes team that won the Clarence S. Campbell Bowl, but lost Stanley Cup Final
^{(#)}	Denotes team that qualified for the Stanley Cup playoffs
‡	Denotes team with most points in the regular season (winner of the Presidents' Trophy since 1985–86)

Season	1st	2nd	3rd	4th	5th	6th
1974–75	^{(DC)} Vancouver (86)	^{(6)} St. Louis (84)	^{(7)} Chicago (82)	Minnesota (53)	Kansas City (41)	
1975–76	^{(DC)} Chicago (82)	^{(7)} Vancouver (81)	^{(8)} St. Louis (72)	Minnesota (47)	Kansas City (36)	
1976–77	^{(DC)} St. Louis (73)	^{(7)} Minnesota (64)	^{(8)} Chicago (63)	Vancouver (63)	Colorado (54)	
1977–78	^{(DC)} Chicago (83)	^{(8)} Colorado (59)	Vancouver (57)	St. Louis (53)	Minnesota (45)	
1978–79	^{(DC)} Chicago (73)	^{(8)} Vancouver (63)	St. Louis (48)	Colorado (42)		
1979–80	^{(7)} Chicago (87)	^{(10)} St. Louis (80)	^{(15)} Vancouver (70)	^{(16)} Edmonton (69)	Winnipeg (51)	Colorado (51)
1980–81	^{(2)} St. Louis (107)	^{(10)} Chicago (78)	^{(12)} Vancouver (76)	^{(14)} Edmonton (74)	Colorado (57)	Winnipeg (32)
1981–82	Edmonton (111)	Vancouver (77)	Calgary (75)	Los Angeles (63)	Colorado (49)	
1982–83	Edmonton (106)	Calgary (78)	Vancouver (75)	Winnipeg (74)	Los Angeles (66)	
1983–84	Edmonton (119)^{‡}	Calgary (82)	Vancouver (73)	Winnipeg (73)	Los Angeles (59)	
1984–85	Edmonton (109)	Winnipeg (96)	Calgary (94)	Los Angeles (82)	Vancouver (59)	
1985–86	Edmonton (119)^{‡}	Calgary (89)	Winnipeg (59)	Vancouver (59)	Los Angeles (54)	
1986–87	Edmonton (106)^{‡}	Calgary (95)	Winnipeg (88)	Los Angeles (70)	Vancouver (66)	
1987–88	Calgary (105)^{‡}	Edmonton (99)	Winnipeg (77)	Los Angeles (68)	Vancouver (59)	
1988–89	Calgary (117)^{‡}	Los Angeles (91)	Edmonton (84)	Vancouver (74)	Winnipeg (64)	
1989–90	Calgary (99)	Edmonton (90)	Winnipeg (85)	Los Angeles (75)	Vancouver (64)	
1990–91	Los Angeles (102)	Calgary (100)	Edmonton (80)	Vancouver (65)	Winnipeg (63)	
1991–92	Vancouver (96)	Los Angeles (84)	Edmonton (82)	Winnipeg (81)	Calgary (74)	San Jose (39)
1992–93	Vancouver (101)	Calgary (97)	Los Angeles (88)	Winnipeg (87)	Edmonton (60)	San Jose (24)

== Smythe Division titles won by team ==
Team	Wins	Last win
Edmonton Oilers	6	1987
Chicago Black Hawks	4	1980
Vancouver Canucks	3	1993
Calgary Flames	3	1990
St. Louis Blues	2	1981
Los Angeles Kings	1	1991
Kansas City Scouts/Colorado Rockies	0	—
Minnesota North Stars	0	—
San Jose Sharks	0	—
Winnipeg Jets	0	—
