= 1981–82 Minnesota North Stars season =

National Hockey League team season

1981–82 Minnesota North Stars
- Norris Division champions
- Division: 1st Norris
- Conference: 2nd Campbell
- 1981–82 record: 37–23–20
- Home record: 21–7–12
- Road record: 16–16–8
- Goals for: 346
- Goals against: 288

Team information
- General manager: Lou Nanne
- Coach: Glen Sonmor
- Captain: Tim Young
- Alternate captains: None
- Arena: Met Center
- Average attendance: 15,220
- Minor league affiliate: Nashville South Stars (CHL)

Team leaders
- Goals: Dino Ciccarelli (55)
- Assists: Bobby Smith (71)
- Points: Bobby Smith (114)
- Penalty minutes: Dino Ciccarelli (138)
- Wins: Gilles Meloche (26)
- Goals against average: Lindsay Middlebrook (3.00)

The 1981–82 Minnesota North Stars season was their 15th season. Dino Ciccarelli, in his second season, scored 55 goals, a franchise record. Minnesota won their first division title, but lost in the first round of the playoffs to the Chicago Black Hawks.

== Offseason ==
Prior to the season, realignment of the NHL's divisions took place, which saw the North Stars leave the Adams Division and join the Norris Division. They would join alongside the Chicago Black Hawks, Detroit Red Wings, St. Louis Blues, Toronto Maple Leafs, and Winnipeg Jets.

== Regular season ==
Glen Sonmor took a temporary leave of absence in January 1982, leaving assistant coach Murray Oliver in charge for four games, three of which the North Stars won.

=== Final standings ===
Norris Division
	GP	W	L	T	GF	GA	Pts
**Minnesota North Stars**	80	37	23	20	346	288	94
**Winnipeg Jets**	80	33	33	14	319	332	80
**St. Louis Blues**	80	32	40	8	315	349	72
**Chicago Black Hawks**	80	30	38	12	332	363	72
Toronto Maple Leafs	80	20	44	16	298	380	56
Detroit Red Wings	80	21	47	12	270	351	54

Note: GP = Games played, W = Wins, L = Losses, T = Ties, Pts = Points, GF = Goals for, GA = Goals against
Note: Teams that qualified for the playoffs are highlighted in bold.

=== Record vs. opponents ===
Norris Division record vs. opponents

==== Vs. Campbell Conference ====
**Vs. Norris Division**

1981–82 NHL records
Team	**CHI**	**DET**	**MIN**	**STL**	**TOR**	**WIN**	**Total**
Chicago	—	3−3−1	3−3−1	2−4−1	3−4	2−3−2	13−17−5
Detroit	3−3−1	—	1−6	2−5	3−3−1	2−3−2	11−20−4
Minnesota	3−3−1	6−1	—	3−3−1	4−0−3	3−3−1	19−10−6
St. Louis	4−2−1	5−2	3−3−1	—	5−2	1−4−2	18−13−4
Toronto	4−3	3−3−1	0−4−3	2−5	—	2−4−1	11−19−5
Winnipeg	3−2−2	3−2−2	3−3−1	4−1−2	4−2−1	—	17−10−8

**Vs. Smythe Division**

1981–82 NHL records
Team	**CGY**	**COL**	**EDM**	**LAK**	**VAN**	**Total**
Chicago	2−0−1	1−2	1−1−1	3−0	1−2	8−5−2
Detroit	1−1−1	3−0	0−2−1	1−2	1−1−1	6−6−3
Minnesota	1−0−2	1−0−2	0−2−1	2−0−1	1−1−1	5−3−7
St. Louis	2−1	2−1	0−3	1−2	2−1	7−8−0
Toronto	0−1−2	1−0−2	1−2	2−1	0−2−1	4−6−5
Winnipeg	2−1	2−1	1−2	3−0	1−2	9−6−0

**Vs. Wales Conference**

**Vs. Adams Division**

1981–82 NHL records
Team	**BOS**	**BUF**	**HFD**	**MTL**	**QUE**	**Total**
Chicago	2−1	1−2	1−1−1	0−2−1	1−2	5−8−2
Detroit	0−2−1	0−3	0−2−1	1−2	0−3	1−12−2
Minnesota	2−1	1−1−1	2−1	0−1−2	2−0−1	7−4−4
St. Louis	1−1−1	1−2	1−2	0−2−1	1−2	4−9−2
Toronto	0−3	0−2−1	0−3	0−2−1	1−1−1	1−11−3
Winnipeg	0−3	0−1−2	1−2	0−1−2	0−2−1	1−9−5

**Vs. Patrick Division**

1981–82 NHL records
Team	**NYI**	**NYR**	**PHI**	**PIT**	**WSH**	**Total**
Chicago	0−3	0−3	1−1−1	1−0−2	2−1	4−8−3
Detroit	0−3	1−2	0−2−1	2−1	0−1−2	3−9−3
Minnesota	0−2−1	1−2	1−1−1	2−1	2−0−1	6−6−3
St. Louis	0−2−1	0−2−1	0−3	2−1	1−2	3−10−2
Toronto	0−3	1−1−1	1−2	1−0−2	1−2	4−8−3
Winnipeg	1−2	1−1−1	2–1	1–2	1−2	6–8–1

== Schedule and results ==
=== Regular season ===
1981–82 regular season
October

Game	Result	Date	Score	Opponent	Record
1	T	October 8, 1981	3–3	Toronto Maple Leafs (1981–82)	0–0–1
2	W	October 10, 1981	7–0	New York Rangers (1981–82)	1–0–1
3	W	October 12, 1981	4–2	@ Quebec Nordiques (1981–82)	2–0–1
4	W	October 14, 1981	2–1	@ Toronto Maple Leafs (1981–82)	3–0–1
5	L	October 17, 1981	2–5	@ Pittsburgh Penguins (1981–82)	3–1–1
6	L	October 18, 1981	2–3	@ Philadelphia Flyers (1981–82)	3–2–1
7	T	October 22, 1981	5–5	St. Louis Blues (1981–82)	3–2–2
8	W	October 24, 1981	6–3	Los Angeles Kings (1981–82)	4–2–2
9	W	October 25, 1981	6–3	@ Buffalo Sabres (1981–82)	5–2–2
10	W	October 28, 1981	6–1	Calgary Flames (1981–82)	6–2–2
11	W	October 31, 1981	5–4	Detroit Red Wings (1981–82)	7–2–2

November

Game	Result	Date	Score	Opponent	Record
12	W	November 4, 1981	6–1	@ Washington Capitals (1981–82)	8–2–2
13	L	November 7, 1981	2–4	@ Hartford Whalers (1981–82)	8–3–2
14	W	November 8, 1981	4–1	@ Boston Bruins (1981–82)	9–3–2
15	W	November 11, 1981	15–2	Winnipeg Jets (1981–82)	10–3–2
16	T	November 14, 1981	5–5	Quebec Nordiques (1981–82)	10–3–3
17	W	November 18, 1981	6–4	@ Winnipeg Jets (1981–82)	11–3–3
18	T	November 19, 1981	2–2	Edmonton Oilers (1981–82)	11–3–4
19	L	November 21, 1981	4–6	Chicago Black Hawks (1981–82)	11–4–4
20	T	November 22, 1981	1–1	@ Chicago Black Hawks (1981–82)	11–4–5
21	T	November 25, 1981	4–4	Washington Capitals (1981–82)	11–4–6
22	T	November 27, 1981	5–5	@ Winnipeg Jets (1981–82)	11–4–7
23	W	November 28, 1981	5–3	Philadelphia Flyers (1981–82)	12–4–7
24	T	November 30, 1981	2–2	Colorado Rockies (1981–82)	12–4–8

December

Game	Result	Date	Score	Opponent	Record
25	L	December 2, 1981	0–5	@ Vancouver Canucks (1981–82)	12–5–8
26	L	December 5, 1981	5–8	New York Islanders (1981–82)	12–6–8
27	T	December 9, 1981	6–6	Montreal Canadiens (1981–82)	12–6–9
28	L	December 10, 1981	1–4	@ Detroit Red Wings (1981–82)	12–7–9
29	W	December 12, 1981	6–3	Chicago Black Hawks (1981–82)	13–7–9
30	L	December 15, 1981	2–4	@ St. Louis Blues (1981–82)	13–8–9
31	L	December 17, 1981	2–4	Winnipeg Jets (1981–82)	13–9–9
32	L	December 19, 1981	6–9	@ Edmonton Oilers (1981–82)	13–10–9
33	T	December 22, 1981	4–4	@ Vancouver Canucks (1981–82)	13–10–10
34	T	December 23, 1981	4–4	@ Calgary Flames (1981–82)	13–10–11
35	W	December 26, 1981	6–3	St. Louis Blues (1981–82)	14–10–11
36	T	December 28, 1981	4–4	Colorado Rockies (1981–82)	14–10–12
37	L	December 31, 1981	2–4	@ Buffalo Sabres (1981–82)	14–11–12

January

Game	Result	Date	Score	Opponent	Record
38	W	January 2, 1982	6–2	@ Toronto Maple Leafs (1981–82)	15–11–12
39	L	January 5, 1982	1–4	@ St. Louis Blues (1981–82)	15–12–12
40	T	January 6, 1982	3–3	Toronto Maple Leafs (1981–82)	15–12–13
41	T	January 9, 1982	3–3	Montreal Canadiens (1981–82)	15–12–14
42	L	January 11, 1982	3–5	@ New York Rangers (1981–82)	15–13–14
43	L	January 13, 1982	0–2	New York Rangers (1981–82)	15–14–14
44	W	January 16, 1982	4–1	Quebec Nordiques (1981–82)	16–14–14
45	W	January 17, 1982	7–5	Chicago Black Hawks (1981–82)	17–14–14
46	W	January 20, 1982	3–1	@ Colorado Rockies (1981–82)	18–14–14
47	T	January 21, 1982	3–3	@ Los Angeles Kings (1981–82)	18–14–15
48	W	January 23, 1982	8–4	Chicago Black Hawks (1981–82)	19–14–15
49	W	January 25, 1982	9–2	@ Toronto Maple Leafs (1981–82)	20–14–15
50	W	January 27, 1982	8–6	Detroit Red Wings (1981–82)	21–14–15
51	L	January 28, 1982	3–8	@ St. Louis Blues (1981–82)	21–15–15
52	L	January 30, 1982	2–4	@ New York Islanders (1981–82)	21–16–15

February

Game	Result	Date	Score	Opponent	Record
53	W	February 3, 1982	9–6	@ Pittsburgh Penguins (1981–82)	22–16–15
54	T	February 4, 1982	3–3	@ Philadelphia Flyers (1981–82)	22–16–16
55	L	February 7, 1982	2–5	@ Chicago Black Hawks (1981–82)	22–17–16
56	L	February 11, 1982	2–4	Boston Bruins (1981–82)	22–18–16
57	W	February 13, 1982	6–1	Detroit Red Wings (1981–82)	23–18–16
58	T	February 15, 1982	3–3	@ Toronto Maple Leafs (1981–82)	23–18–17
59	L	February 17, 1982	4–7	@ Edmonton Oilers (1981–82)	23–19–17
60	T	February 18, 1982	2–2	@ Calgary Flames (1981–82)	23–19–18
61	W	February 20, 1982	7–3	Washington Capitals (1981–82)	24–19–18
62	W	February 22, 1982	8–7	Hartford Whalers (1981–82)	25–19–18
63	W	February 24, 1982	7–5	Toronto Maple Leafs (1981–82)	26–19–18
64	T	February 27, 1982	5–5	Buffalo Sabres (1981–82)	26–19–19
65	W	February 28, 1982	5–4	@ Detroit Red Wings (1981–82)	27–19–19

March

Game	Result	Date	Score	Opponent	Record
66	W	March 3, 1982	6–4	Detroit Red Wings (1981–82)	28–19–19
67	W	March 6, 1982	3–1	Vancouver Canucks (1981–82)	29–19–19
68	W	March 8, 1982	8–1	St. Louis Blues (1981–82)	30–19–19
69	T	March 10, 1982	4–4	New York Islanders (1981–82)	30–19–20
70	W	March 13, 1982	3–2	@ St. Louis Blues (1981–82)	31–19–20
71	W	March 15, 1982	4–3	Pittsburgh Penguins (1981–82)	32–19–20
72	L	March 17, 1982	2–3	Winnipeg Jets (1981–82)	32–20–20
73	L	March 20, 1982	1–5	@ Montreal Canadiens (1981–82)	32–21–20
74	W	March 22, 1982	4–2	Los Angeles Kings (1981–82)	33–21–20
75	W	March 25, 1982	4–3	@ Detroit Red Wings (1981–82)	34–21–20
76	W	March 27, 1982	6–5	@ Boston Bruins (1981–82)	35–21–20
77	W	March 28, 1982	5–2	@ Hartford Whalers (1981–82)	36–21–20
78	L	March 30, 1982	5–7	Winnipeg Jets (1981–82)	36–22–20

April

Game	Result	Date	Score	Opponent	Record
79	W	April 2, 1982	5–2	@ Winnipeg Jets (1981–82)	37–22–20
80	L	April 4, 1982	3–4	@ Chicago Black Hawks (1981–82)	37–23–20

Legend: Win (2 points) Loss (0 points) Tie (1 point)

=== Playoffs ===
1982 Stanley Cup playoffs
Norris Division Semifinals vs. (N4) Chicago Black Hawks – Black Hawks win 3–1

Game	Date	Visitor	Score	Home	Series
1	April 7	Chicago Black Hawks	3–2	Minnesota North Stars	1–0
2	April 8	Chicago Black Hawks	5–3	Minnesota North Stars	2–0
3	April 10	Minnesota North Stars	7–1	Chicago Black Hawks	2–1
4	April 11	Minnesota North Stars	2–5	Chicago Black Hawks	3–1

Legend: Win Loss

== Playoffs ==
The North Stars lost in the first round to Chicago. The Black Hawks won the best-of-five series, three games to one.

== Player statistics ==
=== Skaters ===
Note: GP = Games played; G = Goals; A = Assists; Pts = Points; PIM = Penalty minutes

Player	GP	G	A	Pts	+/-	PIM
Bobby Smith	80	43	71	114	+10	82
Dino Ciccarelli	76	55	51	106	+14	138
Neal Broten	73	38	60	98	+14	42
Steve Payne	74	33	45	78	+20	76
Craig Hartsburg	76	17	60	77	+11	117
Al MacAdam	79	18	43	61	+9	37
Steve Christoff	69	26	29	55	+9	14
Brad Palmer	72	22	23	45	-13	18
Tom McCarthy	40	12	30	42	+10	36
Tim Young	50	10	31	41	+1	67
Gordie Roberts	79	4	30	34	-3	119
Brad Maxwell	51	10	21	31	+6	96
Mike Eaves	25	11	10	21	+2	0
Kent-Erik Andersson	70	9	12	21	-5	18
Fred Barrett	69	1	15	16	-12	89
Anders Håkansson	72	12	4	16	-11	29
Curt Giles	74	3	12	15	+15	87
Jack Carlson	57	8	4	12	-5	103
Bill Nyrop	42	4	8	12	+14	35
Ken Solheim	29	4	5	9	-8	4
Gary Sargent	15	0	5	5	+5	18
Kevin Maxwell	12	1	4	5	-1	8
Mark Johnson	10	2	2	4	-4	10
Murray Brumwell	21	0	3	3	E	18
Dan Poulin	3	1	1	2	+1	2
Ron Meighan	7	1	1	2	-1	2
Tom Younghans	3	1	0	1	+1	0

=== Goaltending ===
Note: GP = Games played; W = Wins; L = Losses; T = Ties; SO = Shutouts; GAA = Goals against average

Player	GP	W	L	T	SO	GAA
Gilles Meloche	51	26	15	9	1	3.48
Don Beaupre	28	11	8	9	0	3.71
Lindsay Middlebrook	3	0	0	2	0	3.00

== Draft picks ==
Minnesota's draft picks at the 1981 NHL entry draft held at the Montreal Forum in Montreal.

Round	#	Player	Nationality	College/Junior/Club team (League)
1	13	Ron Meighan	Canada	Niagara Falls Flyers (OMJHL)
2	27	Dave Donnelly	Canada	St. Albert Saints (AJHL)
2	31	Mike Sands	Canada	Sudbury Wolves (OMJHL)
2	33	Tom Hirsch	United States	Patrick Henry High School (USHS-MN)
2	34	Dave Preuss	United States	St. Thomas Academy (USHS-MN)
2	41	Jali Wahlsten	Finland	TPS (Finland)
4	69	Terry Tait	Canada	Sault Ste. Marie Greyhounds (OMJHL)
4	76	Jim Malwitz	United States	Grand Rapids High School (USHS-MN)
5	97	Kelly Hubbard	Canada	Portland Winter Hawks (WHL)
6	118	Paul Guay	United States	Mount Saint Charles Academy (USHS-RI)
7	139	Jim Archibald	Canada	Moose Jaw Canucks (SJHL)
8	160	Kari Kanervo	Finland	TPS (Finland)
9	181	Scott Bjugstad	United States	University of Minnesota (WCHA)
10	202	Steve Kudebeh	United States	Breck School (USHS-MN)
