= 1981–82 Montreal Canadiens season =

NHL hockey team season

1981–82 Montreal Canadiens
- Adams Division champions
- Division: 1st Adams
- Conference: 2nd Wales
- 1981–82 record: 46–17–17
- Home record: 25–6–9
- Road record: 21–11–8
- Goals for: 360
- Goals against: 223

Team information
- General manager: Irving Grundman
- Coach: Bob Berry
- Captain: Bob Gainey
- Alternate captains: None
- Arena: Montreal Forum
- Average attendance: 16,587

Team leaders
- Goals: Mark Napier (40)
- Assists: Guy Lafleur (57)
- Points: Keith Acton (88)
- Penalty minutes: Chris Nilan (204)
- Plus/minus: Brian Engblom (+76)
- Wins: Rick Wamsley (23)
- Goals against average: Denis Herron (2.64)

The 1981–82 Montreal Canadiens season was the team's 73rd season. The club finished with over 100 points in the regular season, and were third overall in the NHL standings. The season involved being eliminated in the Adams Division semi-final versus the Quebec Nordiques 3 games to 2.

== Offseason ==
Montreal along with Hartford were moved to the Adams Division which was a more geographical grouping of teams, including Boston, Buffalo and Quebec. Before the 1981 NHL entry draft, general manager Irving Grundman announced that Bob Berry would be the new head coach of the Canadiens.

Bob Gainey is named captain, following Serge Savard's signing with the Winnipeg Jets.

== Regular season ==
=== Final standings ===
Adams Division
	GP	W	L	T	GF	GA	PIM	PTS
**Montreal Canadiens**	80	46	17	17	360	223	1463	109
**Boston Bruins**	80	43	27	10	323	285	1266	96
**Buffalo Sabres**	80	39	26	15	307	273	1425	93
**Quebec Nordiques**	80	33	31	16	356	345	1757	82
Hartford Whalers	80	21	41	18	264	351	1493	60

Note: GP = Games played, W = Wins, L = Losses, T = Ties, Pts = Points, GF = Goals for, GA = Goals against
Note: Teams that qualified for the playoffs are highlighted in bold.

=== Record vs. opponents ===
Adams Division record vs. opponents

==== Vs. Wales Conference ====
**Vs. Adams Division**

1981–82 NHL records
Team	**BOS**	**BUF**	**HFD**	**MTL**	**QUE**	**Total**
Boston	—	5–2–1	4–2–2	0–7–1	4–4	**13–15–4**
Buffalo	2–5–1	—	4–1–3	3–2–3	4–3–1	**13–11–8**
Hartford	2–4–2	1–4–3	—	0–7–1	2–3–3	**5–18–9**
Montreal	7–0–1	2–3–3	7–0–1	—	3–3–2	**19–6–7**
Quebec	4–4	3–4–1	3–2–3	3–3–2	—	**13–13–6**

**Vs. Patrick Division**

1981–82 NHL records
Team	**NYI**	**NYR**	**PHI**	**PIT**	**WSH**	**Total**
Boston	2–1	2–1	1–2	1–1–1	3–0	**9–5–1**
Buffalo	2–1	0–2–1	1–2	2–1	3–0	**8–6–1**
Hartford	0–2–1	1–1–1	0−3	0–2–1	1–2	**2–10–3**
Montreal	1–2	2–1	2–1	2–1	1–2	**8–7–0**
Quebec	1–1–1	1–1–1	1–1–1	0–3	2–0–1	**5–6–4**

==== Vs. Campbell Conference ====
**Vs. Norris Division**

1981–82 NHL records
Team	**CHI**	**DET**	**MIN**	**STL**	**TOR**	**WIN**	**Total**
Boston	1−2	2−0−1	1−2	1−1–1	3−0	3−0	**11−5−2**
Buffalo	2−1	3−0	1−1−1	2−1	2−0−1	1−0−2	**11−3−4**
Hartford	1–1–1	2–0–1	1–2	2–1	3–0	2−1	**11−5−2**
Montreal	2−0−1	2−1	1–0−2	2−0−1	2–0−1	1−0−2	**10−1−7**
Quebec	2−1	3−0	0−2–1	2−1	1−1–1	2−0−1	**10−5−3**

**Vs. Smythe Division**

1981–82 NHL records
Team	**CGY**	**COL**	**EDM**	**LAK**	**VAN**	**Total**
Boston	1−1−1	3−0	1−0–2	3−0	2−1	**10−2−3**
Buffalo	0−2−1	3–0	1−2	2−1	1−1−1	**7−6−2**
Hartford	1–2	0–2–1	0–2–1	2–0–1	0–2–1	**3–8–4**
Montreal	2−1	2−0−1	1−0−2	2–1	2−1	**9−3−3**
Quebec	0−3	2−1	2−1	0–1–2	1–1−1	**5−7−3**

== Schedule and results ==
1981–82 regular season
October

Game	Result	Date	Score	Opponent	Record
1	T	October 8, 1981	5–5	Hartford Whalers (1981–82)	0–0–1
2	W	October 10, 1981	9–0	Buffalo Sabres (1981–82)	1–0–1
3	W	October 15, 1981	7–2	@ Hartford Whalers (1981–82)	2–0–1
4	W	October 17, 1981	10–4	Vancouver Canucks (1981–82)	3–0–1
5	T	October 18, 1981	3–3	@ Buffalo Sabres (1981–82)	3–0–2
6	T	October 21, 1981	3–3	@ Chicago Black Hawks (1981–82)	3–0–3
7	W	October 24, 1981	7–0	Boston Bruins (1981–82)	4–0–3
8	W	October 25, 1981	4–2	@ New York Rangers (1981–82)	5–0–3
9	W	October 27, 1981	11–2	Philadelphia Flyers (1981–82)	6–0–3
10	T	October 29, 1981	5–5	@ Boston Bruins (1981–82)	6–0–4
11	L	October 31, 1981	1–2	New York Islanders (1981–82)	6–1–4

November

Game	Result	Date	Score	Opponent	Record
12	L	November 2, 1981	4–5	@ Quebec Nordiques (1981–82)	6–2–4
13	W	November 5, 1981	4–3	St. Louis Blues (1981–82)	7–2–4
14	W	November 7, 1981	4–2	Detroit Red Wings (1981–82)	8–2–4
15	L	November 10, 1981	2–4	@ Los Angeles Kings (1981–82)	8–3–4
16	W	November 11, 1981	9–0	@ Colorado Rockies (1981–82)	9–3–4
17	W	November 14, 1981	4–1	@ Vancouver Canucks (1981–82)	10–3–4
18	T	November 19, 1981	1–1	Quebec Nordiques (1981–82)	10–3–5
19	W	November 21, 1981	9–5	Pittsburgh Penguins (1981–82)	11–3–5
20	T	November 24, 1981	2–2	@ St. Louis Blues (1981–82)	11–3–6
21	L	November 25, 1981	1–2	@ Pittsburgh Penguins (1981–82)	11–4–6
22	L	November 27, 1981	2–5	@ Washington Capitals (1981–82)	11–5–6
23	W	November 29, 1981	6–3	Hartford Whalers (1981–82)	12–5–6

December

Game	Result	Date	Score	Opponent	Record
24	T	December 1, 1981	3–3	Edmonton Oilers (1981–82)	12–5–7
25	L	December 3, 1981	3–4	@ Detroit Red Wings (1981–82)	12–6–7
26	L	December 5, 1981	4–7	Calgary Flames (1981–82)	12–7–7
27	T	December 9, 1981	6–6	@ Minnesota North Stars (1981–82)	12–7–8
28	T	December 11, 1981	5–5	@ Winnipeg Jets (1981–82)	12–7–9
29	W	December 12, 1981	6–2	@ Toronto Maple Leafs (1981–82)	13–7–9
30	W	December 14, 1981	6–3	Washington Capitals (1981–82)	14–7–9
31	W	December 16, 1981	6–1	@ Hartford Whalers (1981–82)	15–7–9
32	W	December 17, 1981	5–1	@ Boston Bruins (1981–82)	16–7–9
33	W	December 19, 1981	5–2	Boston Bruins (1981–82)	17–7–9
34	L	December 22, 1981	2–5	@ Quebec Nordiques (1981–82)	17–8–9
35	W	December 27, 1981	6–3	Quebec Nordiques (1981–82)	18–8–9
36	W	December 29, 1981	5–4	@ New York Islanders (1981–82)	19–8–9
37	W	December 30, 1981	6–3	Chicago Black Hawks (1981–82)	20–8–9

January

Game	Result	Date	Score	Opponent	Record
38	L	January 2, 1982	5–6	New York Rangers (1981–82)	20–9–9
39	L	January 3, 1982	2–3	@ Buffalo Sabres (1981–82)	20–10–9
40	W	January 5, 1982	3–1	Boston Bruins (1981–82)	21–10–9
41	T	January 9, 1982	3–3	@ Minnesota North Stars (1981–82)	21–10–10
42	T	January 10, 1982	4–4	@ Winnipeg Jets (1981–82)	21–10–11
43	W	January 12, 1982	2–1	Los Angeles Kings (1981–82)	22–10–11
44	L	January 16, 1982	2–4	Philadelphia Flyers (1981–82)	22–11–11
45	T	January 19, 1982	2–2	Buffalo Sabres (1981–82)	22–11–12
46	W	January 21, 1982	4–2	@ Philadelphia Flyers (1981–82)	23–11–12
47	W	January 23, 1982	6–2	Calgary Flames (1981–82)	24–11–12
48	W	January 26, 1982	8–3	@ Quebec Nordiques (1981–82)	25–11–12
49	W	January 28, 1982	6–3	@ Boston Bruins (1981–82)	26–11–12
50	W	January 30, 1982	5–3	Detroit Red Wings (1981–82)	27–11–12

February

Game	Result	Date	Score	Opponent	Record
51	W	February 2, 1982	5–3	@ Calgary Flames (1981–82)	28–11–12
52	W	February 3, 1982	6–3	@ Edmonton Oilers (1981–82)	29–11–12
53	W	February 6, 1982	5–3	@ Colorado Rockies (1981–82)	30–11–12
54	W	February 7, 1982	7–2	@ Los Angeles Kings (1981–82)	31–11–12
55	W	February 11, 1982	4–2	Pittsburgh Penguins (1981–82)	32–11–12
56	W	February 13, 1982	7–3	Winnipeg Jets (1981–82)	33–11–12
57	T	February 16, 1982	3–3	Colorado Rockies (1981–82)	33–11–13
58	W	February 18, 1982	5–3	St. Louis Blues (1981–82)	34–11–13
59	T	February 20, 1982	2–2	Buffalo Sabres (1981–82)	34–11–14
60	W	February 21, 1982	4–2	@ New York Rangers (1981–82)	35–11–14
61	L	February 23, 1982	3–4	@ Quebec Nordiques (1981–82)	35–12–14
62	T	February 25, 1982	4–4	Quebec Nordiques (1981–82)	35–12–15
63	T	February 27, 1982	3–3	Toronto Maple Leafs (1981–82)	35–12–16
64	W	February 28, 1982	5–0	@ Hartford Whalers (1981–82)	36–12–16

March

Game	Result	Date	Score	Opponent	Record
65	T	March 2, 1982	3–3	Edmonton Oilers (1981–82)	36–12–17
66	W	March 6, 1982	6–1	@ Toronto Maple Leafs (1981–82)	37–12–17
67	W	March 7, 1982	5–3	@ Buffalo Sabres (1981–82)	38–12–17
68	W	March 9, 1982	4–2	Boston Bruins (1981–82)	39–12–17
69	W	March 11, 1982	4–0	Chicago Black Hawks (1981–82)	40–12–17
70	W	March 13, 1982	5–0	Hartford Whalers (1981–82)	41–12–17
71	W	March 14, 1982	5–2	@ Boston Bruins (1981–82)	42–12–17
72	L	March 18, 1982	2–4	Vancouver Canucks (1981–82)	42–13–17
73	W	March 20, 1982	5–1	Minnesota North Stars (1981–82)	43–13–17
74	L	March 21, 1982	4–5	@ Buffalo Sabres (1981–82)	43–14–17
75	L	March 25, 1982	1–3	@ New York Islanders (1981–82)	43–15–17
76	W	March 27, 1982	4–2	Quebec Nordiques (1981–82)	44–15–17
77	W	March 30, 1982	6–4	Hartford Whalers (1981–82)	45–15–17
78	W	March 31, 1982	5–1	@ Hartford Whalers (1981–82)	46–15–17

April

Game	Result	Date	Score	Opponent	Record
79	L	April 3, 1982	4–5	Buffalo Sabres (1981–82)	46–16–17
80	L	April 4, 1982	1–3	@ Washington Capitals (1981–82)	46–17–17

Legend: Win (2 points) Loss (0 points) Tie (1 point)

== Playoffs ==
The Canadiens were seeded 3rd overall in the playoffs, while their opponents, the Quebec Nordiques were seeded 10th overall. The clubs were 27 points apart in the league standings. The fifth and final game of the series went into overtime. Twenty-two seconds into overtime, Nordiques' Dale Hunter scored against Canadiens goalie Rick Wamsley to clinch the series.

== Player statistics ==
=== Regular season ===
==== Scoring ====
Player	Pos	GP	G	A	Pts	PIM	+/-	PPG	SHG	GWG
Keith Acton	C	78	36	52	88	88	48	10	0	5
Guy Lafleur	RW	66	27	57	84	24	33	9	0	3
Mark Napier	RW	80	40	41	81	14	49	9	0	5
Mario Tremblay	RW	80	33	40	73	66	24	7	0	4
Pierre Mondou	C	73	35	33	68	57	18	8	2	4
Larry Robinson	D	71	12	47	59	41	57	5	1	0
Steve Shutt	LW	57	31	24	55	40	24	5	0	3
Doug Jarvis	C	80	20	28	48	20	34	1	0	4
Bob Gainey	LW	79	21	24	45	24	37	1	3	1
Rejean Houle	W	51	11	32	43	34	18	2	1	1
Rod Langway	D	66	5	34	39	116	66	1	0	1
Doug Wickenheiser	C	56	12	23	35	43	18	1	0	3
Doug Risebrough	C	59	15	18	33	116	23	2	2	2
Brian Engblom	D	76	4	29	33	76	78	1	0	0
Mark Hunter	RW	71	18	11	29	143	10	0	0	5
Robert Picard	D	62	2	26	28	106	17	2	0	0
Gaston Gingras	D	34	6	18	24	28	10	3	0	3
Craig Laughlin	RW	36	12	11	23	33	10	2	0	1
Pierre Larouche	C	22	9	12	21	0	-3	3	0	0
Guy Lapointe	D	47	1	19	20	72	-3	0	0	0
Chris Nilan	RW	49	7	4	11	204	6	0	0	1
Gilbert Delorme	D	60	3	8	11	55	19	0	0	0
Rick Wamsley	G	38	0	2	2	4	0	0	0	0
Jeff Brubaker	LW	3	0	1	1	32	1	0	0	0
Denis Herron	G	27	0	0	0	4	0	0	0	0
Mark Holden	G	1	0	0	0	0	0	0	0	0
Bill Kitchen	D	1	0	0	0	7	0	0	0	0
Dave Orleski	LW	1	0	0	0	0	0	0	0	0
Richard Sevigny	G	19	0	0	0	10	0	0	0	0

==== Goaltending ====
Player	MIN	GP	W	L	T	GA	GAA	SO
Rick Wamsley	2206	38	23	7	7	101	2.75	2
Denis Herron	1547	27	12	6	8	68	2.64	3
Richard Sevigny	1027	19	11	4	2	53	3.10	0
Mark Holden	20	1	0	0	0	0	0.00	0
Team:	4800	80	46	17	17	222	2.78	5

=== Playoffs ===
==== Scoring ====
Player	Pos	GP	G	A	Pts	PIM	PPG	SHG	GWG
Pierre Mondou	C	5	2	5	7	8	1	1	0
Mario Tremblay	RW	5	4	1	5	24	0	0	1
Mark Napier	RW	5	3	2	5	0	1	1	1
Keith Acton	C	5	0	4	4	16	0	0	0
Rejean Houle	W	5	0	4	4	6	0	0	0
Guy Lafleur	RW	5	2	1	3	4	2	0	0
Doug Risebrough	C	5	2	1	3	11	0	0	0
Rod Langway	D	5	0	3	3	18	0	0	0
Chris Nilan	RW	5	1	1	2	22	0	0	0
Robert Picard	D	5	1	1	2	7	0	0	0
Brian Engblom	D	5	0	2	2	14	0	0	0
Doug Jarvis	C	5	1	0	1	4	0	1	0
Bob Gainey	LW	5	0	1	1	8	0	0	0
Gaston Gingras	D	5	0	1	1	0	0	0	0
Bill Kitchen	D	3	0	1	1	0	0	0	0
Craig Laughlin	RW	3	0	1	1	0	0	0	0
Larry Robinson	D	5	0	1	1	8	0	0	0
Jeff Brubaker	LW	2	0	0	0	27	0	0	0
Mark Hunter	RW	5	0	0	0	20	0	0	0
Rick Wamsley	G	5	0	0	0	2	0	0	0

==== Goaltending ====
Player	MIN	GP	W	L	GA	GAA	SO
Rick Wamsley	300	5	2	3	11	2.20	0
Team:	300	5	2	3	11	2.20	0

Note:

Pos = Position;GP = Games played; G = Goals; A = Assists; Pts = Points; PIM = Penalty minutes; +/- = Plus/minus; PPG = Power-play goals; SHG = Short-handed goals; GWG = Game-winning goals
Pos = Position;GP = Games played; Min, TOI = Minutes played; W = Wins; L = Losses; T,T/OT = Ties; OTL = Overtime losses; GA = Goals-against; GAA = Goals-against average; SO = Shutouts; SA = Shots against; SV = Shots saved;SV% = Save percentage;

== Draft picks ==
Round	#	Player	Nationality	College/junior/club team
1	7	Mark Hunter	Canada	Brantford Alexanders (OMJHL)
1	18	Gilbert Delorme	Canada	Chicoutimi Saguenéens (QMJHL)
1	19	Jan Ingman	Sweden	Färjestad BK (Sweden)
2	32	Lars Eriksson	Sweden	Brynäs IF (Sweden)
2	40	Chris Chelios	United States	Moose Jaw Canucks (SJHL)
3	46	Dieter Hegen	West Germany	EVS Kaufbeuren (West Germany)
4	82	Kjell Dahlin	Sweden	Timra IK (Sweden)
5	88	Steve Rooney	United States	Canton High School (USHS-MA)
6	124	Tom Anastos	United States	Paddock Pool Saints (GLJHL)
7	145	Tom Kurvers	United States	University of Minnesota Duluth (WCHA)
8	166	Paul Gess	United States	Bloomington Jefferson High School (USHS-MN)
9	187	Scott Ferguson	United States	Edina West High School (USHS-MN)
10	208	Dan Burrows	Canada	Belleville Bulls (OPJHL)

== See also ==
- 1981–82 NHL season
