= 1981–82 Buffalo Sabres season =

NHL hockey team season

1981–82 Buffalo Sabres
- Division: 3rd Adams
- Conference: 4th Wales
- 1981–82 record: 39–26–15
- Home record: 23–8–9
- Road record: 16–18–6
- Goals for: 307
- Goals against: 273

Team information
- General manager: Scotty Bowman
- Coach: Jim Roberts; Scotty Bowman
- Captain: Danny Gare (Oct–Nov); Gilbert Perreault (Nov–Apr)
- Alternate captains: None
- Arena: Buffalo Memorial Auditorium
- Average attendance: 15,585

Team leaders
- Goals: Gilbert Perreault (31)
- Assists: John Van Boxmeer (54)
- Points: Gilbert Perreault (73)
- Penalty minutes: Larry Playfair (258)
- Wins: Don Edwards (26)
- Goals against average: Jacques Cloutier (2.51)

The 1981–82 Buffalo Sabres season was the Sabres' 12th season of operation for the National Hockey League (NHL) franchise that was established on May 22, 1970.

== Regular season ==
=== Final standings ===
Adams Division
	GP	W	L	T	GF	GA	PIM	PTS
**Montreal Canadiens**	80	46	17	17	360	223	1463	109
**Boston Bruins**	80	43	27	10	323	285	1266	96
**Buffalo Sabres**	80	39	26	15	307	273	1425	93
**Quebec Nordiques**	80	33	31	16	356	345	1757	82
Hartford Whalers	80	21	41	18	264	351	1493	60

Note: GP = Games played, W = Wins, L = Losses, T = Ties, Pts = Points, GF = Goals for, GA = Goals against
Note: Teams that qualified for the playoffs are highlighted in bold.

=== Record vs. opponents ===
Adams Division record vs. opponents

==== Vs. Wales Conference ====
**Vs. Adams Division**

1981–82 NHL records
Team	**BOS**	**BUF**	**HFD**	**MTL**	**QUE**	**Total**
Boston	—	5–2–1	4–2–2	0–7–1	4–4	**13–15–4**
Buffalo	2–5–1	—	4–1–3	3–2–3	4–3–1	**13–11–8**
Hartford	2–4–2	1–4–3	—	0–7–1	2–3–3	**5–18–9**
Montreal	7–0–1	2–3–3	7–0–1	—	3–3–2	**19–6–7**
Quebec	4–4	3–4–1	3–2–3	3–3–2	—	**13–13–6**

**Vs. Patrick Division**

1981–82 NHL records
Team	**NYI**	**NYR**	**PHI**	**PIT**	**WSH**	**Total**
Boston	2–1	2–1	1–2	1–1–1	3–0	**9–5–1**
Buffalo	2–1	0–2–1	1–2	2–1	3–0	**8–6–1**
Hartford	0–2–1	1–1–1	0−3	0–2–1	1–2	**2–10–3**
Montreal	1–2	2–1	2–1	2–1	1–2	**8–7–0**
Quebec	1–1–1	1–1–1	1–1–1	0–3	2–0–1	**5–6–4**

==== Vs. Campbell Conference ====
**Vs. Norris Division**

1981–82 NHL records
Team	**CHI**	**DET**	**MIN**	**STL**	**TOR**	**WIN**	**Total**
Boston	1−2	2−0−1	1−2	1−1–1	3−0	3−0	**11−5−2**
Buffalo	2−1	3−0	1−1−1	2−1	2−0−1	1−0−2	**11−3−4**
Hartford	1–1–1	2–0–1	1–2	2–1	3–0	2−1	**11−5−2**
Montreal	2−0−1	2−1	1–0−2	2−0−1	2–0−1	1−0−2	**10−1−7**
Quebec	2−1	3−0	0−2–1	2−1	1−1–1	2−0−1	**10−5−3**

**Vs. Smythe Division**

1981–82 NHL records
Team	**CGY**	**COL**	**EDM**	**LAK**	**VAN**	**Total**
Boston	1−1−1	3−0	1−0–2	3−0	2−1	**10−2−3**
Buffalo	0−2−1	3–0	1−2	2−1	1−1−1	**7−6−2**
Hartford	1–2	0–2–1	0–2–1	2–0–1	0–2–1	**3–8–4**
Montreal	2−1	2−0−1	1−0−2	2–1	2−1	**9−3−3**
Quebec	0−3	2−1	2−1	0–1–2	1–1−1	**5−7−3**

== Schedule and results ==
1981–82 regular season
October

Game	Result	Date	Score	Opponent	Record
1	W	October 7, 1981	5–3	Washington Capitals (1981–82)	1–0–0
2	L	October 10, 1981	0–9	@ Montreal Canadiens (1981–82)	1–1–0
3	T	October 11, 1981	2–2	Vancouver Canucks (1981–82)	1–1–1
4	W	October 14, 1981	4–2	Quebec Nordiques (1981–82)	2–1–1
5	W	October 17, 1981	4–2	@ Washington Capitals (1981–82)	3–1–1
6	T	October 18, 1981	3–3	Montreal Canadiens (1981–82)	3–1–2
7	T	October 21, 1981	2–2	Winnipeg Jets (1981–82)	3–1–3
8	W	October 23, 1981	6–2	Toronto Maple Leafs (1981–82)	4–1–3
9	L	October 25, 1981	3–6	Minnesota North Stars (1981–82)	4–2–3
10	W	October 28, 1981	6–2	St. Louis Blues (1981–82)	5–2–3
11	L	October 31, 1981	1–3	@ Pittsburgh Penguins (1981–82)	5–3–3

November

Game	Result	Date	Score	Opponent	Record
12	W	November 1, 1981	6–2	Philadelphia Flyers (1981–82)	6–3–3
13	T	November 4, 1981	3–3	Calgary Flames (1981–82)	6–3–4
14	W	November 7, 1981	6–2	@ New York Islanders (1981–82)	7–3–4
15	T	November 8, 1981	2–2	Hartford Whalers (1981–82)	7–3–5
16	L	November 11, 1981	3–7	@ New York Rangers (1981–82)	7–4–5
17	T	November 13, 1981	3–3	New York Rangers (1981–82)	7–4–6
18	W	November 15, 1981	3–1	Boston Bruins (1981–82)	8–4–6
19	L	November 18, 1981	3–4	@ Chicago Black Hawks (1981–82)	8–5–6
20	W	November 20, 1981	4–3	@ Colorado Rockies (1981–82)	9–5–6
21	W	November 21, 1981	7–1	@ Los Angeles Kings (1981–82)	10–5–6
22	W	November 25, 1981	3–1	@ Detroit Red Wings (1981–82)	11–5–6
23	T	November 28, 1981	4–4	@ Toronto Maple Leafs (1981–82)	11–5–7
24	W	November 29, 1981	5–2	New York Islanders (1981–82)	12–5–7

December

Game	Result	Date	Score	Opponent	Record
25	L	December 3, 1981	3–6	@ Boston Bruins (1981–82)	12–6–7
26	W	December 4, 1981	4–2	@ Hartford Whalers (1981–82)	13–6–7
27	W	December 6, 1981	7–4	Pittsburgh Penguins (1981–82)	14–6–7
28	W	December 9, 1981	7–1	Colorado Rockies (1981–82)	15–6–7
29	W	December 12, 1981	4–2	@ Detroit Red Wings (1981–82)	16–6–7
30	T	December 13, 1981	4–4	Quebec Nordiques (1981–82)	16–6–8
31	L	December 15, 1981	3–4	Los Angeles Kings (1981–82)	16–7–8
32	L	December 17, 1981	1–2	@ Philadelphia Flyers (1981–82)	16–8–8
33	L	December 19, 1981	3–7	@ Quebec Nordiques (1981–82)	16–9–8
34	W	December 20, 1981	8–2	Hartford Whalers (1981–82)	17–9–8
35	L	December 22, 1981	2–3	@ St. Louis Blues (1981–82)	17–10–8
36	W	December 26, 1981	7–5	@ Pittsburgh Penguins (1981–82)	18–10–8
37	W	December 27, 1981	3–2	Washington Capitals (1981–82)	19–10–8
38	W	December 31, 1981	4–2	Minnesota North Stars (1981–82)	20–10–8

January

Game	Result	Date	Score	Opponent	Record
39	L	January 2, 1982	3–6	@ Quebec Nordiques (1981–82)	20–11–8
40	W	January 3, 1982	3–2	Montreal Canadiens (1981–82)	21–11–8
41	W	January 6, 1982	5–2	Detroit Red Wings (1981–82)	22–11–8
42	W	January 9, 1982	3–2	@ Hartford Whalers (1981–82)	23–11–8
43	W	January 10, 1982	6–4	Los Angeles Kings (1981–82)	24–11–8
44	W	January 13, 1982	6–2	Chicago Black Hawks (1981–82)	25–11–8
45	W	January 15, 1982	8–2	Toronto Maple Leafs (1981–82)	26–11–8
46	W	January 17, 1982	7–1	Hartford Whalers (1981–82)	27–11–8
47	T	January 19, 1982	2–2	@ Montreal Canadiens (1981–82)	27–11–9
48	W	January 22, 1982	5–3	Quebec Nordiques (1981–82)	28–11–9
49	W	January 23, 1982	3–2	@ Quebec Nordiques (1981–82)	29–11–9
50	L	January 27, 1982	3–4	@ Vancouver Canucks (1981–82)	29–12–9
51	L	January 29, 1982	1–3	@ Edmonton Oilers (1981–82)	29–13–9
52	L	January 30, 1982	2–3	@ Calgary Flames (1981–82)	29–14–9

February

Game	Result	Date	Score	Opponent	Record
53	L	February 3, 1982	2–5	Boston Bruins (1981–82)	29–15–9
54	L	February 4, 1982	2–5	@ Boston Bruins (1981–82)	29–16–9
55	L	February 7, 1982	3–7	New York Islanders (1981–82)	29–17–9
56	W	February 10, 1982	4–3	Winnipeg Jets (1981–82)	30–17–9
57	L	February 11, 1982	4–6	@ Philadelphia Flyers (1981–82)	30–18–9
58	W	February 16, 1982	2–1	@ St. Louis Blues (1981–82)	31–18–9
59	W	February 17, 1982	3–2	@ Chicago Black Hawks (1981–82)	32–18–9
60	T	February 20, 1982	2–2	@ Montreal Canadiens (1981–82)	32–18–10
61	W	February 21, 1982	6–2	Colorado Rockies (1981–82)	33–18–10
62	L	February 24, 1982	3–6	Edmonton Oilers (1981–82)	33–19–10
63	T	February 26, 1982	4–4	@ Winnipeg Jets (1981–82)	33–19–11
64	T	February 27, 1982	5–5	@ Minnesota North Stars (1981–82)	33–19–12

March

Game	Result	Date	Score	Opponent	Record
65	T	March 3, 1982	3–3	Hartford Whalers (1981–82)	33–19–13
66	T	March 6, 1982	2–2	@ Hartford Whalers (1981–82)	33–19–14
67	L	March 7, 1982	3–5	Montreal Canadiens (1981–82)	33–20–14
68	W	March 10, 1982	7–4	@ Vancouver Canucks (1981–82)	34–20–14
69	W	March 12, 1982	3–2	@ Edmonton Oilers (1981–82)	35–20–14
70	L	March 13, 1982	1–4	@ Calgary Flames (1981–82)	35–21–14
71	T	March 16, 1982	3–3	Boston Bruins (1981–82)	35–21–15
72	L	March 18, 1982	1–4	@ Hartford Whalers (1981–82)	35–22–15
73	L	March 20, 1982	4–6	@ Boston Bruins (1981–82)	35–23–15
74	W	March 21, 1982	5–4	Montreal Canadiens (1981–82)	36–23–15
75	L	March 25, 1982	1–5	@ Boston Bruins (1981–82)	36–24–15
76	L	March 26, 1982	5–8	New York Rangers (1981–82)	36–25–15
77	W	March 28, 1982	9–5	Boston Bruins (1981–82)	37–25–15
78	W	March 30, 1982	6–4	@ Quebec Nordiques (1981–82)	38–25–15

April

Game	Result	Date	Score	Opponent	Record
79	W	April 3, 1982	5–4	@ Montreal Canadiens (1981–82)	39–25–15
80	L	April 4, 1982	4–7	Quebec Nordiques (1981–82)	39–26–15

Legend: Win (2 points) Loss (0 points) Tie (1 point)

== Playoffs ==
The Sabres lost to the Boston Bruins three games to one, in the Adams Division semi-finals.

== Draft picks ==
Buffalo's draft picks at the 1981 NHL entry draft held at the Montreal Forum in Montreal.

Round	#	Player	Nationality	College/Junior/Club team (League)
1	17	Jiri Dudacek	Czechoslovakia	HC Kladno (Czechoslovakia)
2	38	Hannu Virta	Finland	TPS (Finland)
3	59	Jim Aldred	Canada	Kingston Canadiens (OMJHL)
3	60	Colin Chisholm	Canada	Calgary Wranglers (WHL)
4	80	Jeff Eatough	Canada	Cornwall Royals (QMJHL)
4	83	Anders Wikberg	Sweden	Timra IK (Sweden)
5	101	Mauri Eivola	Finland	TPS (Finland)
6	122	Ali Butorac	Canada	Ottawa 67's (OMJHL)
7	143	Heikki Leime	Finland	TPS (Finland)
8	164	Gates Orlando	Canada	Providence College (ECAC)
9	185	Venci Sebek	Canada	Niagara Falls Flyers (OMJHL)
10	206	Warren Harper	Canada	Prince Albert Raiders (SJHL)

== See also ==
- 1981–82 NHL season
