= Murray Brumwell =

Canadian retired ice hockey defenceman

- Born: March 31, 1960 (age 64); Calgary, Alberta, Canada
- Height: 6 ft 2 in (188 cm)
- Weight: 190 lb (86 kg; 13 st 8 lb)
- Position: Defence
- Shot: Left
- Played for: NHL; New Jersey Devils; Minnesota North Stars; AHL; Maine Mariners; Utica Devils; New Haven Nighthawks; CHL; Oklahoma City Stars; Nashville South Stars; Wichita Wind
- NHL draft: Undrafted
- Playing career: 1980–1988

James Murray Brumwell (born March 31, 1960) is a Canadian former professional ice hockey defenceman who played parts of 7 different seasons in the National Hockey League, with the New Jersey Devils and the Minnesota North Stars.

== Career statistics ==
			Regular season					Playoffs
Season	Team	League	GP	G	A	Pts	PIM	GP	G	A	Pts	PIM
1977–78	Calgary Canucks	AJHL	59	4	40	44	79	—	—	—	—	—
1977–78	Calgary Wranglers	WCHL	1	0	0	0	2	—	—	—	—	—
1977–78	Saskatoon Blades	WCHL	1	0	2	2	0	—	—	—	—	—
1978–79	Billings Bighorns	WHL	61	11	32	43	62	8	0	4	4	9
1979–80	Billings Bighorns	WHL	67	18	54	72	50	7	2	3	5	12
1980–81	Minnesota North Stars	NHL	1	0	0	0	0	—	—	—	—	—
1980–81	Oklahoma City Stars	CHL	79	12	43	55	79	3	0	0	0	4
1981–82	Minnesota North Stars	NHL	21	0	3	3	18	2	0	0	0	2
1981–82	Nashville South Stars	CHL	55	4	21	25	66	—	—	—	—	—
1982–83	New Jersey Devils	NHL	59	5	14	19	34	—	—	—	—	—
1982–83	Wichita Wind	CHL	11	4	1	5	4	—	—	—	—	—
1983–84	New Jersey Devils	NHL	42	7	13	20	14	—	—	—	—	—
1983–84	Maine Mariners	AHL	35	4	25	29	16	17	1	5	6	15
1984–85	Maine Mariners	AHL	64	8	31	39	12	10	4	5	9	19
1985–86	New Jersey Devils	NHL	1	0	0	0	0	—	—	—	—	—
1985–86	Maine Mariners	AHL	66	9	28	37	35	5	0	3	3	2
1986–87	New Jersey Devils	NHL	1	0	0	0	2	—	—	—	—	—
1986–87	Maine Mariners	AHL	69	10	38	48	30	—	—	—	—	—
1987–88	New Jersey Devils	NHL	3	0	1	1	2	—	—	—	—	—
1987–88	Utica Devils	AHL	77	13	53	66	44	—	—	—	—	—
1988–89	Utica Devils	AHL	73	5	29	34	29	5	0	0	0	2
1989–90	New Haven Nighthawks	AHL	62	7	29	36	24	—	—	—	—	—
1990–91	New Haven Nighthawks	AHL	67	8	18	26	27	—	—	—	—	—
NHL totals			128	12	31	43	70	2	0	0	0	2
AHL totals			513	64	251	315	217	37	5	13	18	38
