= 1981–82 Detroit Red Wings season =

Sports season

1981–82 Detroit Red Wings
- Division: 6th Norris
- Conference: 10th Campbell
- 1981–82 record: 21–47–12
- Home record: 15–19–6
- Road record: 6–28–6
- Goals for: 270
- Goals against: 351

Team information
- General manager: Jimmy Skinner
- Coach: Wayne Maxner (Oct–Mar); Billy Dea (Mar–Apr)
- Captain: Reed Larson
- Alternate captains: None
- Arena: Joe Louis Arena
- Average attendance: 12,496

Team leaders
- Goals: John Ogrodnick (28)
- Assists: Mark Osborne (41)
- Points: Mark Osborne (67)
- Penalty minutes: Reed Larson (112)
- Plus/minus: Jim Schoenfeld (2)
- Wins: Bob Sauve (11)
- Goals against average: Bob Sauve (4.19)

The 1981–82 Detroit Red Wings season was the 50th season as the Red Wings, 56th overall for the franchise. They missed the playoffs for the fourth straight season 1973–74 season and the 1976–77 season.

== Offseason ==
The National Hockey League realigned their divisions into geographically closer groupings. The Red Wings were the only team to remain in the Norris Division from the previous season, while the division itself was moved from the Prince of Wales Conference to the Campbell Conference, trading places with the Patrick Division. The Red Wings were joined in the Norris by the Chicago Black Hawks, Toronto Maple Leafs, St. Louis Blues, Minnesota North Stars, and Winnipeg Jets.

== Regular season ==
=== Final standings ===
Norris Division
	GP	W	L	T	GF	GA	Pts
**Minnesota North Stars**	80	37	23	20	346	288	94
**Winnipeg Jets**	80	33	33	14	319	332	80
**St. Louis Blues**	80	32	40	8	315	349	72
**Chicago Black Hawks**	80	30	38	12	332	363	72
Toronto Maple Leafs	80	20	44	16	298	380	56
Detroit Red Wings	80	21	47	12	270	351	54

Note: GP = Games played, W = Wins, L = Losses, T = Ties, Pts = Points, GF = Goals for, GA = Goals against
Note: Teams that qualified for the playoffs are highlighted in bold.

=== Record vs. opponents ===
Norris Division record vs. opponents

==== Vs. Campbell Conference ====
**Vs. Norris Division**

1981–82 NHL records
Team	**CHI**	**DET**	**MIN**	**STL**	**TOR**	**WIN**	**Total**
Chicago	—	3−3−1	3−3−1	2−4−1	3−4	2−3−2	13−17−5
Detroit	3−3−1	—	1−6	2−5	3−3−1	2−3−2	11−20−4
Minnesota	3−3−1	6−1	—	3−3−1	4−0−3	3−3−1	19−10−6
St. Louis	4−2−1	5−2	3−3−1	—	5−2	1−4−2	18−13−4
Toronto	4−3	3−3−1	0−4−3	2−5	—	2−4−1	11−19−5
Winnipeg	3−2−2	3−2−2	3−3−1	4−1−2	4−2−1	—	17−10−8

**Vs. Smythe Division**

1981–82 NHL records
Team	**CGY**	**COL**	**EDM**	**LAK**	**VAN**	**Total**
Chicago	2−0−1	1−2	1−1−1	3−0	1−2	8−5−2
Detroit	1−1−1	3−0	0−2−1	1−2	1−1−1	6−6−3
Minnesota	1−0−2	1−0−2	0−2−1	2−0−1	1−1−1	5−3−7
St. Louis	2−1	2−1	0−3	1−2	2−1	7−8−0
Toronto	0−1−2	1−0−2	1−2	2−1	0−2−1	4−6−5
Winnipeg	2−1	2−1	1−2	3−0	1−2	9−6−0

**Vs. Wales Conference**

**Vs. Adams Division**

1981–82 NHL records
Team	**BOS**	**BUF**	**HFD**	**MTL**	**QUE**	**Total**
Chicago	2−1	1−2	1−1−1	0−2−1	1−2	5−8−2
Detroit	0−2−1	0−3	0−2−1	1−2	0−3	1−12−2
Minnesota	2−1	1−1−1	2−1	0−1−2	2−0−1	7−4−4
St. Louis	1−1−1	1−2	1−2	0−2−1	1−2	4−9−2
Toronto	0−3	0−2−1	0−3	0−2−1	1−1−1	1−11−3
Winnipeg	0−3	0−1−2	1−2	0−1−2	0−2−1	1−9−5

**Vs. Patrick Division**

1981–82 NHL records
Team	**NYI**	**NYR**	**PHI**	**PIT**	**WSH**	**Total**
Chicago	0−3	0−3	1−1−1	1−0−2	2−1	4−8−3
Detroit	0−3	1−2	0−2−1	2−1	0−1−2	3−9−3
Minnesota	0−2−1	1−2	1−1−1	2−1	2−0−1	6−6−3
St. Louis	0−2−1	0−2−1	0−3	2−1	1−2	3−10−2
Toronto	0−3	1−1−1	1−2	1−0−2	1−2	4−8−3
Winnipeg	1−2	1−1−1	2–1	1–2	1−2	6–8–1

== Schedule and results ==
1981–82 regular season
October

Game	Result	Date	Score	Opponent	Record
1	W	October 6, 1981	5–2	@ New York Rangers (1981–82)	1–0–0
2	T	October 9, 1981	2–2	@ Philadelphia Flyers (1981–82)	1–0–1
3	L	October 10, 1981	3–6	@ Washington Capitals (1981–82)	1–1–1
4	W	October 15, 1981	6–3	St. Louis Blues (1981–82)	2–1–1
5	L	October 17, 1981	1–8	@ Hartford Whalers (1981–82)	2–2–1
6	W	October 18, 1981	3–2	Pittsburgh Penguins (1981–82)	3–2–1
7	T	October 22, 1981	2–2	Boston Bruins (1981–82)	3–2–2
8	L	October 24, 1981	3–8	@ Quebec Nordiques (1981–82)	3–3–2
9	L	October 25, 1981	1–4	Philadelphia Flyers (1981–82)	3–4–2
10	W	October 29, 1981	12–4	Calgary Flames (1981–82)	4–4–2
11	L	October 31, 1981	4–5	@ Minnesota North Stars (1981–82)	4–5–2

November

Game	Result	Date	Score	Opponent	Record
12	W	November 1, 1981	3–1	Vancouver Canucks (1981–82)	5–5–2
13	W	November 5, 1981	10–2	Los Angeles Kings (1981–82)	6–5–2
14	L	November 7, 1981	2–4	@ Montreal Canadiens (1981–82)	6–6–2
15	L	November 9, 1981	3–5	@ Quebec Nordiques (1981–82)	6–7–2
16	T	November 11, 1981	5–5	@ Chicago Black Hawks (1981–82)	6–7–3
17	T	November 13, 1981	3–3	@ Washington Capitals (1981–82)	6–7–4
18	W	November 14, 1981	6–3	Chicago Black Hawks (1981–82)	7–7–4
19	L	November 18, 1981	1–8	@ Los Angeles Kings (1981–82)	7–8–4
20	L	November 19, 1981	3–8	@ Vancouver Canucks (1981–82)	7–9–4
21	T	November 21, 1981	4–4	@ Calgary Flames (1981–82)	7–9–5
22	L	November 23, 1981	4–8	@ Edmonton Oilers (1981–82)	7–10–5
23	L	November 25, 1981	1–3	Buffalo Sabres (1981–82)	7–11–5
24	L	November 28, 1981	3–5	@ Pittsburgh Penguins (1981–82)	7–12–5
25	L	November 29, 1981	3–6	Toronto Maple Leafs (1981–82)	7–13–5

December

Game	Result	Date	Score	Opponent	Record
26	L	December 1, 1981	5–7	@ St. Louis Blues (1981–82)	7–14–5
27	W	December 3, 1981	4–3	Montreal Canadiens (1981–82)	8–14–5
28	L	December 5, 1981	2–5	Philadelphia Flyers (1981–82)	8–15–5
29	W	December 10, 1981	4–1	Minnesota North Stars (1981–82)	9–15–5
30	L	December 12, 1981	2–4	Buffalo Sabres (1981–82)	9–16–5
31	W	December 13, 1981	2–1	@ Winnipeg Jets (1981–82)	10–16–5
32	L	December 17, 1981	2–3	Quebec Nordiques (1981–82)	10–17–5
33	L	December 19, 1981	1–5	@ New York Islanders (1981–82)	10–18–5
34	L	December 20, 1981	3–5	New York Islanders (1981–82)	10–19–5
35	L	December 22, 1981	2–3	Hartford Whalers (1981–82)	10–20–5
36	L	December 26, 1981	3–8	@ Toronto Maple Leafs (1981–82)	10–21–5
37	T	December 27, 1981	2–2	@ Winnipeg Jets (1981–82)	10–21–6
38	L	December 31, 1981	2–5	Toronto Maple Leafs (1981–82)	10–22–6

January

Game	Result	Date	Score	Opponent	Record
39	W	January 2, 1982	3–1	@ Colorado Rockies (1981–82)	11–22–6
40	L	January 3, 1982	3–4	@ Chicago Black Hawks (1981–82)	11–23–6
41	L	January 6, 1982	2–5	@ Buffalo Sabres (1981–82)	11–24–6
42	W	January 7, 1982	5–4	Pittsburgh Penguins (1981–82)	12–24–6
43	L	January 9, 1982	2–4	Winnipeg Jets (1981–82)	12–25–6
44	W	January 14, 1982	3–1	Colorado Rockies (1981–82)	13–25–6
45	T	January 16, 1982	5–5	Washington Capitals (1981–82)	13–25–7
46	T	January 17, 1982	4–4	Edmonton Oilers (1981–82)	13–25–8
47	W	January 20, 1982	5–4	@ Chicago Black Hawks (1981–82)	14–25–8
48	L	January 21, 1982	4–7	Calgary Flames (1981–82)	14–26–8
49	T	January 23, 1982	2–2	Hartford Whalers (1981–82)	14–26–9
50	T	January 26, 1982	3–3	Winnipeg Jets (1981–82)	14–26–10
51	L	January 27, 1982	6–8	@ Minnesota North Stars (1981–82)	14–27–10
52	L	January 30, 1982	3–5	@ Montreal Canadiens (1981–82)	14–28–10

February

Game	Result	Date	Score	Opponent	Record
53	W	February 4, 1982	6–4	Chicago Black Hawks (1981–82)	15–28–10
54	L	February 6, 1982	2–6	@ New York Islanders (1981–82)	15–29–10
55	W	February 7, 1982	8–5	St. Louis Blues (1981–82)	16–29–10
56	T	February 11, 1982	4–4	Vancouver Canucks (1981–82)	16–29–11
57	L	February 13, 1982	1–6	@ Minnesota North Stars (1981–82)	16–30–11
58	T	February 17, 1982	3–3	@ Toronto Maple Leafs (1981–82)	16–30–12
59	W	February 18, 1982	4–3	Toronto Maple Leafs (1981–82)	17–30–12
60	L	February 20, 1982	5–7	Boston Bruins (1981–82)	17–31–12
61	L	February 21, 1982	3–7	Edmonton Oilers (1981–82)	17–32–12
62	W	February 23, 1982	6–3	@ Colorado Rockies (1981–82)	18–32–12
63	L	February 24, 1982	3–5	@ Los Angeles Kings (1981–82)	18–33–12
64	L	February 27, 1982	2–6	@ St. Louis Blues (1981–82)	18–34–12
65	L	February 28, 1982	4–5	Minnesota North Stars (1981–82)	18–35–12

March

Game	Result	Date	Score	Opponent	Record
66	L	March 3, 1982	4–6	@ Minnesota North Stars (1981–82)	18–36–12
67	L	March 5, 1982	0–2	@ Winnipeg Jets (1981–82)	18–37–12
68	L	March 6, 1982	1–5	@ St. Louis Blues (1981–82)	18–38–12
69	L	March 8, 1982	3–6	@ New York Rangers (1981–82)	18–39–12
70	L	March 11, 1982	1–4	New York Rangers (1981–82)	18–40–12
71	L	March 13, 1982	3–5	@ Boston Bruins (1981–82)	18–41–12
72	L	March 18, 1982	4–7	St. Louis Blues (1981–82)	18–42–12
73	L	March 20, 1982	3–4	Chicago Black Hawks (1981–82)	18–43–12
74	L	March 21, 1982	2–8	@ Winnipeg Jets (1981–82)	18–44–12
75	L	March 24, 1982	4–6	@ Chicago Black Hawks (1981–82)	18–45–12
76	L	March 25, 1982	3–4	Minnesota North Stars (1981–82)	18–46–12
77	W	March 27, 1982	2–1	@ Toronto Maple Leafs (1981–82)	19–46–12
78	W	March 28, 1982	6–4	Toronto Maple Leafs (1981–82)	20–46–12
79	W	March 31, 1982	4–2	Winnipeg Jets (1981–82)	21–46–12

April

Game	Result	Date	Score	Opponent	Record
80	L	April 4, 1982	2–3	St. Louis Blues (1981–82)	21–47–12

Legend: Win (2 points) Loss (0 points) Tie (1 point)

== Player statistics ==
=== Regular season ===
Scoring

Player	Pos	GP	G	A	Pts	PIM	+/-	PPG	SHG	GWG
Mark Osborne	LW	80	26	41	67	61	-7	5	0	3
Reed Larson	D	80	21	39	60	112	-17	4	2	2
Mike Blaisdell	RW	80	23	32	55	48	-15	5	0	3
Walt McKechnie	C	74	18	37	55	35	-1	2	0	3
John Ogrodnick	LW	80	28	26	54	28	-15	3	2	3
Willie Huber	D	74	15	30	45	98	-16	5	0	2
Mark Kirton	C	74	14	28	42	62	-18	0	1	0
Vaclav Nedomansky	RW	68	12	28	40	22	-15	1	0	0
Greg Smith	D	69	10	22	32	79	-22	2	0	1
Dale McCourt	C	26	13	14	27	6	-3	6	0	0
Paul Woods	LW	75	10	17	27	48	-5	0	1	1
Mike Foligno	RW	26	13	13	26	28	-2	3	0	0
Eric Vail	LW	52	10	14	24	35	-21	3	0	0
Danny Gare	RW	36	13	9	22	74	-4	2	1	0
Don Murdoch	RW	49	9	13	22	23	1	1	0	1
Derek Smith	C/LW	49	6	14	20	10	-4	0	0	0
Jody Gage	RW	31	9	10	19	2	-1	0	0	1
Ted Nolan	C	41	4	13	17	45	-6	0	2	0
Jim Schoenfeld	D	39	5	9	14	69	2	0	0	0
John Barrett	D	69	1	12	13	93	-31	0	0	0
Jim Korn	D/LW	59	1	7	8	104	-19	0	0	0
Mark Lofthouse	RW/C	12	3	4	7	13	-7	0	0	0
Greg Joly	D	37	1	5	6	30	-5	0	1	0
George Lyle	LW	11	1	2	3	4	-2	0	0	0
Brad Smith	RW	33	2	0	2	80	-7	0	0	1
Claude Loiselle	C	4	1	0	1	2	-2	1	0	0
Brent Peterson	C	15	1	0	1	6	-6	0	0	0
Rejean Cloutier	D	2	0	1	1	2				
Gilles Gilbert	G	27	0	0	0	2	0	0	0	0
Claude Legris	G	1	0	0	0	0	0	0	0	0
Corrado Micalef	G	18	0	0	0	9	0	0	0	0
Joe Paterson	LW	3	0	0	0	0	1	0	0	0
Bob Sauve	G	41	0	0	0	0	0	0	0	0
Greg Stefan	G	2	0	0	0	0	0	0	0	0

Goaltending

Player	MIN	GP	W	L	T	GA	GAA	SO
Bob Sauve	2365	41	11	25	4	165	4.19	0
Gilles Gilbert	1478	27	6	10	6	105	4.26	0
Corrado Micalef	809	18	4	10	1	63	4.67	0
Claude Legris	28	1	0	0	1	0	0.00	0
Greg Stefan	120	2	0	2	0	10	5.00	0
Team:	4800	80	21	47	12	343	4.29	0

Note: GP = Games played; G = Goals; A = Assists; Pts = Points; +/- = Plus-minus PIM = Penalty minutes; PPG = Power-play goals; SHG = Short-handed goals; GWG = Game-winning goals;
MIN = Minutes played; W = Wins; L = Losses; T = Ties; GA = Goals against; GAA = Goals-against average; SO = Shutouts;

== Draft picks ==
Detroit's draft picks at the 1981 NHL entry draft held at the Montreal Forum in Montreal.

Round	#	Player	Nationality	College/Junior/Club team (League)
2	23	Claude Loiselle	Canada	Windsor Spitfires (OMJHL)
3	44	Corrado Micalef	Canada	Sherbrooke Castors (QMJHL)
5	86	Larry Trader	Canada	London Knights (OMJHL)
6	107	Gerard Gallant	Canada	Sherbrooke Castors (QMJHL)
7	128	Greg Stefan	Canada	Oshawa Generals (OMJHL)
8	149	Rick Zombo	United States	Austin Mavericks (USHL)
9	170	Don LeBlanc	United States	Moncton Hawks (NBJHL)
10	191	Robert Nordmark	Sweden	Frolunda (Sweden)

== See also ==
- 1981–82 NHL season
