= 1981–82 Hartford Whalers season =

National Hockey League team season

1981–82 Hartford Whalers
- Division: 5th Adams
- Conference: 10th Wales
- 1981–82 record: 21–41–18
- Home record: 13–17–10
- Road record: 8–24–8
- Goals for: 264
- Goals against: 351

Team information
- General manager: Larry Pleau
- Coach: Larry Pleau
- Captain: Dave Keon
- Arena: Hartford Civic Center
- Average attendance: 11,703 (80.7%)
- Minor league affiliates: Binghamton Whalers (AHL); Saginaw Gears (IHL)

Team leaders
- Goals: Blaine Stoughton (52)
- Assists: Mark Howe (45)
- Points: Blaine Stoughton (91)
- Penalty minutes: Garry Howatt (242)
- Plus/minus: Mark Howe (+8)
- Wins: Greg Millen (11)
- Goals against average: John Garrett (4.21)

The 1981–82 Hartford Whalers season was the Whalers' third season in the National Hockey League (NHL). The Whalers failed to qualify for the post-season for the second consecutive season. Hartford finished the regular season with a 21–41–18 record, earning 60 points, which was 22 points behind the Quebec Nordiques for the fourth and final playoff spot in the Adams Division.

== Offseason ==
The NHL realigned into what were for all intents and purposes entirely new divisions that, while retaining all of the names that had been used since 1974, were closely based on North American geography. This ended the Whalers' two-year stay in the Norris Division, as along with the Montreal Canadiens they moved from the Norris to the Adams Division where they were joined by their closest geographical rival Boston Bruins in addition to the Buffalo Sabres and Quebec Nordiques.

At the 1981 NHL entry draft held at the Montreal Forum in Montreal on June 10, the Whalers selected center Ron Francis of the Sault Ste. Marie Greyhounds of the Ontario Hockey League with their first round, fourth overall selection. In 64 games with the Greyhounds in 1980–81, Francis scored 26 goals and 69 points.

On June 15, the Whalers signed restricted free agent goaltender Greg Millen from the Pittsburgh Penguins. Hartford sent forwards Pat Boutette and Kevin McClelland to the Penguins as compensation. In 63 games with the Penguins in 1980–81, Millen earned a record of 25–27–10 with a 4.17 GAA and a save percentage of .864.

A couple of weeks later, on July 3, the Whalers were involved in a blockbuster trade with the Philadelphia Flyers. Hartford sent defenseman Fred Arthur, right winger Ray Allison, a first round and a third round draft pick from the 1982 NHL entry draft to Philadelphia for center Rick MacLeish, defenseman Blake Wesley, right winger Don Gillen, and the Flyers first round, second round and third round draft picks in the 1982 NHL entry draft. MacLeish was coming off a season in which he scored 38 goals and 74 points in 78 games with the Flyers in 1980–81. He won two Stanley Cup championships with Philadelphia in 1974 and 1975, in which in both seasons he led the NHL in playoff scoring. Wesley split the 1980–81 season between the Flyers and their American Hockey League affiliate, the Maine Mariners. In 50 games with Philadelphia, Wesley scored three goals and 10 points, while in 24 games with Maine, Wesley scored six goals and 16 points, followed by a goal and nine points in nine post-season games with the Mariners. Gillen spent the entire 1980–81 season with Maine, scoring 30 goals, 59 points and 255 penalty minutes in 79 games, before adding four goals and eight points in 20 playoff games.

On October 2, the Whalers were involved in two trades. In the first trade, Hartford acquired right winger Doug Sulliman, defenseman Chris Kotsopoulos and defenseman Gerry McDonald from the New York Rangers in exchange for center Mike Rogers and a tenth round selection in the 1982 NHL entry draft. In 32 games with New York, Sulliman scored four goals and five points before scoring a goal in three playoff games with the Rangers. He also played in 45 games with the New Haven Nighthawks of the AHL, where he scored 10 goals and 26 points. As a rookie in 1980–81, Kotsopoulos appeared in 52 games with the Rangers, scoring four goals, 16 points and accumulating 153 penalty minutes. In 14 post-season games, Kotsopoulos earned three assists while racking up 63 penalty minutes. McDonald appeared in 70 games with the Nighthawks in 1980–81, scoring six goals and 29 points. In four playoff games, McDonald was held off the scoresheet.

The second trade the Whalers were involved in on October 2 was with the New York Islanders. Hartford traded a fifth round draft pick from the 1983 NHL entry draft to the Islanders for left winger Garry Howatt. Howatt scored four goals and 19 points in 70 games with New York in 1980–81. He earned two assists in eight playoff games. Howatt was a two time Stanley Cup champion with the Islanders, winning in both 1980 and 1981.

During the waiver draft on October 5, the Whalers acquired right winger Mike McDougal from the New York Rangers and center Rob McClanahan from the Buffalo Sabres. McDougal scored 21 goals and 44 points in 66 games with the New Haven Nighthawks of the AHL during the 1980–81 season, however, he was held to no points in four playoff games. McDougal also played in two games with the Rangers, earning no points. McClanahan scored three goals and 15 points in 57 games with the Sabres during the 1980–81 season before earning an assist in five playoff games. McClanahan also played in 18 games with the Rochester Americans of the AHL, scoring nine goals and 22 points. In the same draft, the Whalers lost defenseman Al Sims to the Los Angeles Kings and left winger Jeff Brubaker to the Montreal Canadiens.

== Regular season ==
=== October ===
The Whalers opened the 1981–82 season on the road against the Quebec Nordiques in front of a sold-out crowd at Le Colisée on October 6, losing a close one to the Nordiques, by a 6–5 score. Two nights later, Hartford earned their first point of the season, as the Whalers and Montreal Canadiens skated to a 5–5 tie.

Hartford had their home opener on October 10 against their new divisional rivals, the Boston Bruins, in front of 13,107 fans at the Civic Center. The Whalers and Bruins fought to a 1–1 tie, as Hartford goaltender Greg Millen led the way with 23 saves, while Blaine Stoughton scored the only goal for the team.

After going winless in their first four games of the season (0–2–2), the Whalers finally earned their first victory, as Rick Meagher recorded a hat trick, as Hartford crushed the Detroit Red Wings by an 8–1 score.

The victory over Detroit would be the Whalers only win of the month, as Hartford finished October with a five-game winless streak (0–2–3), finishing October with a 1–4–5 record, earning seven points, and sat in last place in the Adams Division, six points behind the Buffalo Sabres for fourth place.

=== November ===
Hartford opened November with a pair of 4–1 losses to the Boston Bruins and Vancouver Canucks to fall to 1–6–5 on the season, before earning their second win of the year, a 4–2 decision against the Minnesota North Stars on November 9.

The Whalers would follow the victory with a four-game winless skid (0–2–2), to fall to 2–8–7 on the season through their first 17 games of the year. Hartford would snap the winless streak with an 8–5 win over the Toronto Maple Leafs. A highlight in the game was when Ron Francis scored his first career goal.

Wins would be scarce for the Whalers in November, as they would record only one more victory in November, and ended the month with a record of 3–7–3 in 13 games, and fall to 4–11–8 on the season, earning 16 points, in last place in the Adams Division, 14 points behind the Montreal Canadiens for the final playoff spot.

=== December ===
The Whalers opened December with their first road win of the season, defeating the Toronto Maple Leafs 5–3 at Maple Leaf Gardens in Toronto on December 2. Overall, Hartford would win three of their first four games of the month, as they recorded wins against the New York Rangers and the St. Louis Blues.

After their 3–1–0 start to the month, Hartford fell into a five-game winless streak (0–4–1), getting their only point in a 5–5 tie against the Los Angeles Kings, before earning a 3–2 victory over the Detroit Red Wings to snap their skid in their final game before Christmas.

The team then went 2–2–0 in their final four games of December, to finish the month with a 6–7–1 record in 14 games, and post a 10–18–9 record on the season. The Whalers remained in last place in the Adams Division, 14 points behind the fourth place Quebec Nordiques.

=== January ===
Hartford got off to a terrible start in January, as the club dropped their first five games of the month, before finally earning a tie against the Boston Bruins on January 16, as Blaine Stoughton scored two goals in a 3–3 tie. Hartford then lost their next game by a 7–1 score against the Buffalo Sabres the next night to extend their winless skid to seven games.

The team ended their winless skid with a solid 4–2 victory over the Quebec Nordiques on January 20. This marked the start of a six-game unbeaten streak (4–0–2) for the Whalers to end the month.

Hartford managed to post a 4–6–3 record in 13 games in January, and an overall record of 14–24–12 on the season, earning 40 points. The Whalers were stuck in the Adams Division cellar, 18 points behind the fourth place Quebec Nordiques.

=== February ===
The Whalers continued to stay hot at the start of February, as Hartford went 2–0–2 on a four-game road trip, and extended their overall unbeaten streak to a team record 10 games (6–0–4). The unbeaten streak came to an end on February 13, as the New York Rangers defeated Hartford by a 3–2 score.

The loss to the Rangers began a string of losses for the Whalers, as the team went on a six-game losing streak, before snapping the skid with a 4–3 win over the Boston Bruins on February 24. Hartford then lost their last two games of the month, and eight of nine overall.

The club went 3–8–2 in their 13 February games, slipping to a 17–32–14 record on the season, registering 48 points, and 23 points behind the Quebec Nordiques.

=== March/April ===
The team opened March with two ties against the Buffalo Sabres, followed by a two-game winning streak, defeating the Los Angeles Kings and Winnipeg Jets. The Whalers four-game unbeaten streak came to an end on March 13, as the Montreal Canadiens shutout Hartford 5–0. The club lost their second straight game the next night, 4–3 to the Colorado Rockies.

The Whalers managed to snap their two-game losing streak, and won consecutive games, beating the Quebec Nordiques and Buffalo Sabres. Those wins were the Whalers last of the season, as the team finished the season with a nine-game winless streak (0–7–2).

Hartford finished the year with a 21–41–18 record for the second straight season, earning 60 points, and were the last place team in the Adams Division, 22 points behind the Quebec Nordiques for the fourth and final playoff spot in the division.

=== Final standings ===
Adams Division
| | GP | W | L | T | GF | GA | PIM | PTS |
|---|---|---|---|---|---|---|---|---|
| **Montreal Canadiens** | 80 | 46 | 17 | 17 | 360 | 223 | 1463 | 109 |
| **Boston Bruins** | 80 | 43 | 27 | 10 | 323 | 285 | 1266 | 96 |
| **Buffalo Sabres** | 80 | 39 | 26 | 15 | 307 | 273 | 1425 | 93 |
| **Quebec Nordiques** | 80 | 33 | 31 | 16 | 356 | 345 | 1757 | 82 |
| Hartford Whalers | 80 | 21 | 41 | 18 | 264 | 351 | 1493 | 60 |

Note: GP = Games played, W = Wins, L = Losses, T = Ties, Pts = Points, GF = Goals for, GA = Goals against
Note: Teams that qualified for the playoffs are highlighted in bold.

=== Record vs. opponents ===
Adams Division record vs. opponents

==== Vs. Wales Conference ====
**Vs. Adams Division**

1981–82 NHL records
| Team | **BOS** | **BUF** | **HFD** | **MTL** | **QUE** | **Total** |
|---|---|---|---|---|---|---|
| Boston | — | 5–2–1 | 4–2–2 | 0–7–1 | 4–4 | **13–15–4** |
| Buffalo | 2–5–1 | — | 4–1–3 | 3–2–3 | 4–3–1 | **13–11–8** |
| Hartford | 2–4–2 | 1–4–3 | — | 0–7–1 | 2–3–3 | **5–18–9** |
| Montreal | 7–0–1 | 2–3–3 | 7–0–1 | — | 3–3–2 | **19–6–7** |
| Quebec | 4–4 | 3–4–1 | 3–2–3 | 3–3–2 | — | **13–13–6** |

**Vs. Patrick Division**

1981–82 NHL records
| Team | **NYI** | **NYR** | **PHI** | **PIT** | **WSH** | **Total** |
|---|---|---|---|---|---|---|
| Boston | 2–1 | 2–1 | 1–2 | 1–1–1 | 3–0 | **9–5–1** |
| Buffalo | 2–1 | 0–2–1 | 1–2 | 2–1 | 3–0 | **8–6–1** |
| Hartford | 0–2–1 | 1–1–1 | 0−3 | 0–2–1 | 1–2 | **2–10–3** |
| Montreal | 1–2 | 2–1 | 2–1 | 2–1 | 1–2 | **8–7–0** |
| Quebec | 1–1–1 | 1–1–1 | 1–1–1 | 0–3 | 2–0–1 | **5–6–4** |

==== Vs. Campbell Conference ====
**Vs. Norris Division**

1981–82 NHL records
| Team | **CHI** | **DET** | **MIN** | **STL** | **TOR** | **WIN** | **Total** |
|---|---|---|---|---|---|---|---|
| Boston | 1−2 | 2−0−1 | 1−2 | 1−1–1 | 3−0 | 3−0 | **11−5−2** |
| Buffalo | 2−1 | 3−0 | 1−1−1 | 2−1 | 2−0−1 | 1−0−2 | **11−3−4** |
| Hartford | 1–1–1 | 2–0–1 | 1–2 | 2–1 | 3–0 | 2−1 | **11−5−2** |
| Montreal | 2−0−1 | 2−1 | 1–0−2 | 2−0−1 | 2–0−1 | 1−0−2 | **10−1−7** |
| Quebec | 2−1 | 3−0 | 0−2–1 | 2−1 | 1−1–1 | 2−0−1 | **10−5−3** |

**Vs. Smythe Division**

1981–82 NHL records
| Team | **CGY** | **COL** | **EDM** | **LAK** | **VAN** | **Total** |
|---|---|---|---|---|---|---|
| Boston | 1−1−1 | 3−0 | 1−0–2 | 3−0 | 2−1 | **10−2−3** |
| Buffalo | 0−2−1 | 3–0 | 1−2 | 2−1 | 1−1−1 | **7−6−2** |
| Hartford | 1–2 | 0–2–1 | 0–2–1 | 2–0–1 | 0–2–1 | **3–8–4** |
| Montreal | 2−1 | 2−0−1 | 1−0−2 | 2–1 | 2−1 | **9−3−3** |
| Quebec | 0−3 | 2−1 | 2−1 | 0–1–2 | 1–1−1 | **5−7−3** |

== Schedule and results ==
1981–82 regular season
October

| Game | Result | Date | Score | Opponent | Record | |
|---|---|---|---|---|---|---|
| 1 | L | October 6, 1981 | 5–6 | @ Quebec Nordiques (1981–82) | 0–1–0 | 15,007 |
| 2 | T | October 8, 1981 | 5–5 | @ Montreal Canadiens (1981–82) | 0–1–1 | 15,474 |
| 3 | T | October 10, 1981 | 1–1 | Boston Bruins (1981–82) | 0–1–2 | 13,107 |
| 4 | L | October 15, 1981 | 2–7 | Montreal Canadiens (1981–82) | 0–2–2 | 10,020 |
| 5 | W | October 17, 1981 | 8–1 | Detroit Red Wings (1981–82) | 1–2–2 | 10,656 |
| 6 | L | October 21, 1981 | 2–5 | @ Edmonton Oilers (1981–82) | 1–3–2 | 17,490 |
| 7 | T | October 23, 1981 | 2–2 | @ Vancouver Canucks (1981–82) | 1–3–3 | 11,283 |
| 8 | L | October 24, 1981 | 3–7 | @ Calgary Flames (1981–82) | 1–4–3 | 7,226 |
| 9 | T | October 29, 1981 | 6–6 | New York Islanders (1981–82) | 1–4–4 | 11,395 |
| 10 | T | October 31, 1981 | 2–2 | Chicago Black Hawks (1981–82) | 1–4–5 | 8,990 |

November

| Game | Result | Date | Score | Opponent | Record | Attendance |
|---|---|---|---|---|---|---|
| 11 | L | November 1, 1981 | 1–4 | @ Boston Bruins (1981–82) | 1–5–5 | 8,873 |
| 12 | L | November 4, 1981 | 1–4 | Vancouver Canucks (1981–82) | 1–6–5 | 9,411 |
| 13 | W | November 7, 1981 | 4–2 | Minnesota North Stars (1981–82) | 2–6–5 | 11,779 |
| 14 | T | November 8, 1981 | 2–2 | @ Buffalo Sabres (1981–82) | 2–6–6 | 15,116 |
| 15 | T | November 11, 1981 | 4–4 | Edmonton Oilers (1981–82) | 2–6–7 | 11,101 |
| 16 | L | November 12, 1981 | 3–5 | @ Philadelphia Flyers (1981–82) | 2–7–7 | 17,077 |
| 17 | L | November 14, 1981 | 0–4 | Washington Capitals (1981–82) | 2–8–7 | 11,278 |
| 18 | W | November 18, 1981 | 8–5 | Toronto Maple Leafs (1981–82) | 3–8–7 | 10,015 |
| 19 | L | November 19, 1981 | 1–6 | @ Boston Bruins (1981–82) | 3–9–7 | 8,197 |
| 20 | L | November 21, 1981 | 3–7 | @ Quebec Nordiques (1981–82) | 3–10–7 | 15,016 |
| 21 | T | November 25, 1981 | 3–3 | Quebec Nordiques (1981–82) | 3–10–8 | 12,141 |
| 22 | W | November 28, 1981 | 6–2 | Washington Capitals (1981–82) | 4–10–8 | 12,431 |
| 23 | L | November 29, 1981 | 3–6 | @ Montreal Canadiens (1981–82) | 4–11–8 | 15,188 |

December

| Game | Result | Date | Score | Opponent | Record | Attendance |
|---|---|---|---|---|---|---|
| 24 | W | December 2, 1981 | 5–3 | @ Toronto Maple Leafs (1981–82) | 5–11–8 | 16,192 |
| 25 | L | December 4, 1981 | 2–4 | Buffalo Sabres (1981–82) | 5–12–8 | 10,866 |
| 26 | W | December 6, 1981 | 5–3 | @ New York Rangers (1981–82) | 6–12–8 | 17,427 |
| 27 | W | December 9, 1981 | 5–1 | St. Louis Blues (1981–82) | 7–12–8 | 10,230 |
| 28 | L | December 12, 1981 | 2–4 | Colorado Rockies (1981–82) | 7–13–8 | 13,376 |
| 29 | L | December 13, 1981 | 3–8 | @ Chicago Black Hawks (1981–82) | 7–14–8 | 11,810 |
| 30 | L | December 16, 1981 | 1–6 | Montreal Canadiens (1981–82) | 7–15–8 | 11,556 |
| 31 | T | December 19, 1981 | 5–5 | Los Angeles Kings (1981–82) | 7–15–9 | 10,623 |
| 32 | L | December 20, 1981 | 2–8 | @ Buffalo Sabres (1981–82) | 7–16–9 | 15,056 |
| 33 | W | December 22, 1981 | 3–2 | @ Detroit Red Wings (1981–82) | 8–16–9 | 11,102 |
| 34 | L | December 26, 1981 | 6–9 | Boston Bruins (1981–82) | 8–17–9 | 14,510 |
| 35 | W | December 27, 1981 | 7–3 | Toronto Maple Leafs (1981–82) | 9–17–9 | 11,820 |
| 36 | L | December 29, 1981 | 1–6 | @ St. Louis Blues (1981–82) | 9–18–9 | 17,625 |
| 37 | W | December 30, 1981 | 6–1 | @ Winnipeg Jets (1981–82) | 10–18–9 | 10,470 |

January

| Game | Result | Date | Score | Opponent | Record | Attendance |
|---|---|---|---|---|---|---|
| 38 | L | January 2, 1982 | 4–9 | @ Pittsburgh Penguins (1981–82) | 10–19–9 | 11,699 |
| 39 | L | January 3, 1982 | 4–6 | Pittsburgh Penguins (1981–82) | 10–20–9 | 10,963 |
| 40 | L | January 6, 1982 | 3–5 | Winnipeg Jets (1981–82) | 10–21–9 | 12,097 |
| 41 | L | January 9, 1982 | 2–3 | Buffalo Sabres (1981–82) | 10–22–9 | 11,403 |
| 42 | L | January 11, 1982 | 2–6 | @ Quebec Nordiques (1981–82) | 10–23–9 | 15,216 |
| 43 | T | January 16, 1982 | 3–3 | @ Boston Bruins (1981–82) | 10–23–10 | 13,617 |
| 44 | L | January 17, 1982 | 1–7 | @ Buffalo Sabres (1981–82) | 10–24–10 | 9,474 |
| 45 | W | January 20, 1982 | 4–2 | Quebec Nordiques (1981–82) | 11–24–10 | 11,197 |
| 46 | T | January 23, 1982 | 2–2 | @ Detroit Red Wings (1981–82) | 11–24–11 | 11,218 |
| 47 | W | January 25, 1982 | 6–5 | @ Chicago Black Hawks (1981–82) | 12–24–11 | 7,827 |
| 48 | W | January 27, 1982 | 3–1 | Calgary Flames (1981–82) | 13–24–11 | 11,851 |
| 49 | W | January 30, 1982 | 3–2 | Boston Bruins (1981–82) | 14–24–11 | 14,031 |
| 50 | T | January 31, 1982 | 4–4 | Quebec Nordiques (1981–82) | 14–24–12 | 11,769 |

February

| Game | Result | Date | Score | Opponent | Record | Attendance |
|---|---|---|---|---|---|---|
| 51 | W | February 2, 1982 | 5–3 | @ Los Angeles Kings (1981–82) | 15–24–12 | 7,713 |
| 52 | T | February 5, 1982 | 4–4 | @ Colorado Rockies (1981–82) | 15–24–13 | 6,109 |
| 53 | W | February 6, 1982 | 4–2 | @ St. Louis Blues (1981–82) | 16–24–13 | 13,187 |
| 54 | T | February 10, 1982 | 3–3 | @ Pittsburgh Penguins (1981–82) | 16–24–14 | 8,691 |
| 55 | L | February 13, 1982 | 2–3 | New York Rangers (1981–82) | 16–25–14 | 14,510 |
| 56 | L | February 14, 1982 | 1–9 | New York Islanders (1981–82) | 16–26–14 | 13,605 |
| 57 | L | February 16, 1982 | 2–7 | @ Calgary Flames (1981–82) | 16–27–14 | 7,234 |
| 58 | L | February 19, 1982 | 4–7 | @ Edmonton Oilers (1981–82) | 16–28–14 | 17,490 |
| 59 | L | February 20, 1982 | 2–4 | @ Vancouver Canucks (1981–82) | 16–29–14 | 13,747 |
| 60 | L | February 22, 1982 | 7–8 | @ Minnesota North Stars (1981–82) | 16–30–14 | 13,854 |
| 61 | W | February 24, 1982 | 4–3 | Boston Bruins (1981–82) | 17–30–14 | 13,165 |
| 62 | L | February 27, 1982 | 1–7 | @ Washington Capitals (1981–82) | 17–31–14 | 16,652 |
| 63 | L | February 28, 1982 | 0–5 | Montreal Canadiens (1981–82) | 17–32–14 | 11,426 |

March

| Game | Result | Date | Score | Opponent | Record | Attendance |
|---|---|---|---|---|---|---|
| 64 | T | March 3, 1982 | 3–3 | @ Buffalo Sabres (1981–82) | 17–32–15 | 16,012 |
| 65 | T | March 6, 1982 | 2–2 | Buffalo Sabres (1981–82) | 17–32–16 | 11,104 |
| 66 | W | March 7, 1982 | 7–6 | Los Angeles Kings (1981–82) | 18–32–16 | 11,616 |
| 67 | W | March 10, 1982 | 6–2 | Winnipeg Jets (1981–82) | 19–32–16 | 11,858 |
| 68 | L | March 13, 1982 | 0–5 | @ Montreal Canadiens (1981–82) | 19–33–16 | 16,650 |
| 69 | L | March 14, 1982 | 3–4 | Colorado Rockies (1981–82) | 19–34–16 | 10,445 |
| 70 | W | March 16, 1982 | 7–5 | @ Quebec Nordiques (1981–82) | 20–34–16 | 15,285 |
| 71 | W | March 18, 1982 | 4–1 | Buffalo Sabres (1981–82) | 21–34–16 | 11,011 |
| 72 | L | March 20, 1982 | 2–5 | Philadelphia Flyers (1981–82) | 21–35–16 | 12,210 |
| 73 | L | March 21, 1982 | 3–5 | @ Philadelphia Flyers (1981–82) | 21–36–16 | 17,042 |
| 74 | T | March 24, 1982 | 3–3 | Quebec Nordiques (1981–82) | 21–36–17 | 10,509 |
| 75 | L | March 27, 1982 | 4–5 | @ New York Islanders (1981–82) | 21–37–17 | 15,271 |
| 76 | L | March 28, 1982 | 2–5 | Minnesota North Stars (1981–82) | 21–38–17 | 11,141 |
| 77 | L | March 30, 1982 | 4–6 | @ Montreal Canadiens (1981–82) | 21–39–17 | 16,071 |
| 78 | L | March 31, 1982 | 1–5 | Montreal Canadiens (1981–82) | 21–40–17 | 12,378 |

April

| Game | Result | Date | Score | Opponent | Record | Attendance |
|---|---|---|---|---|---|---|
| 79 | T | April 3, 1982 | 3–3 | New York Rangers (1981–82) | 21–40–18 | 14,510 |
| 80 | L | April 4, 1982 | 2–7 | @ Boston Bruins (1981–82) | 21–41–18 | 10,374 |

Legend: Win (2 points) Loss (0 points) Tie (1 point)

== Transactions ==
The Whalers were involved in the following transactions during the 1981–82 season.

=== Trades ===
| July 3, 1981 | To Philadelphia Flyers Fred Arthur; Ray Allison; 1st round pick in 1982 – Ron Sutter; 3rd round pick in 1982 – Miroslav Dvorak; 3rd round pick in 1984 – John Stevens | To Hartford Whalers Rick MacLeish; Blake Wesley; Don Gillen; 1st round pick in 1982 – Paul Lawless; 2nd round pick in 1982 – Mark Paterson; 3rd round pick in 1982 – Kevin Dineen |
| October 2, 1981 | To New York Rangers Mike Rogers; 10th round pick in 1982 – Simo Saarinen | To Hartford Whalers Doug Sulliman; Chris Kotsopoulos; Gerry McDonald |
| October 2, 1981 | To New York Islanders 5th round pick in 1983 – Bob Caulfield | To Hartford Whalers Garry Howatt |
| December 21, 1981 | To Montreal Canadiens 1st round pick in 1984 – Petr Svoboda; 2nd round pick in 1984 – Brian Benning; 3rd round pick in 1984 – Rocky Dundas | To Hartford Whalers Pierre Larouche; 1st round pick in 1984 – Sylvain Cote; 3rd round pick in 1985 – Bruce Racine |
| December 29, 1981 | To Pittsburgh Penguins Rick MacLeish | To Hartford Whalers Russ Anderson; 8th round pick in 1983 – Chris Duperron |
| January 12, 1982 | To Quebec Nordiques John Garrett | To Hartford Whalers Michel Plasse; 4th round pick in 1983 – Ron Chyzowski |
| January 29, 1982 | To New York Rangers Rob McClanahan | To Hartford Whalers 10th round pick in 1983 – Reine Karlsson |

=== Waivers ===
| October 5, 1981 | To Los Angeles Kings Al Sims |
| October 5, 1981 | To Montreal Canadiens Jeff Brubaker |
| October 5, 1981 | From New York Rangers Mike McDougal |
| October 5, 1981 | From Buffalo Sabres Rob McClanahan |
| November 13, 1981 | From Detroit Red Wings George Lyle |

=== Free agents ===
| Player | Former team |
| Jeff Brownschidle | Notre Dame Fighting Irish (NCAA) |
| Greg Millen | Pittsburgh Penguins |
| Paul Shmyr | Minnesota North Stars |

== Draft picks ==
Hartford's draft picks from the 1981 NHL entry draft which was held at the Montreal Forum in Montreal on June 10, 1981.

| Round | # | Player | Nationality | College/junior/club team (league) |
|---|---|---|---|---|
| 1 | 4 | Ron Francis | Canada | Sault Ste. Marie Greyhounds (OHL) |
| 3 | 61 | Paul MacDermid | Canada | Windsor Spitfires (OHL) |
| 4 | 67 | Mike Hoffman | Canada | Brantford Alexanders (OHL) |
| 5 | 93 | Bill Maguire | Canada | Niagara Falls Flyers (OHL) |
| 5 | 103 | Dan Bourbonnais | Canada | Calgary Wranglers (WHL) |
| 7 | 130 | John Mokosak | Canada | Victoria Cougars (WHL) |
| 8 | 151 | Denis Dore | Canada | Chicoutimi Saguenéens (QMJHL) |
| 9 | 172 | Jeff Poeschl | United States | Northern Michigan University (WCHA) |
| 10 | 193 | Larry Power | Canada | Kitchener Ranger B's (MWJHL) |

== See also ==
- 1981–82 NHL season
