= 1981–82 Boston Bruins season =

NHL team season

1981–82 Boston Bruins
- Division: 2nd Adams
- Conference: 3rd Wales
- 1981–82 record: 43–27–10
- Home record: 24–12–4
- Road record: 19–15–6
- Goals for: 323
- Goals against: 285

Team information
- General manager: Harry Sinden
- Coach: Gerry Cheevers
- Captain: Wayne Cashman
- Alternate captains: None
- Arena: Boston Garden
- Average attendance: 12,024

Team leaders
- Goals: Rick Middleton (51)
- Assists: Ray Bourque (49)
- Points: Rick Middleton (94)
- Penalty minutes: Terry O'Reilly (213)
- Wins: Marco Baron (22)
- Goals against average: Marco Baron (3.43)

The 1981–82 Boston Bruins season was the Bruins' 58th season.

== Regular season ==
=== Final standings ===
Adams Division
	GP	W	L	T	GF	GA	PIM	PTS
**Montreal Canadiens**	80	46	17	17	360	223	1463	109
**Boston Bruins**	80	43	27	10	323	285	1266	96
**Buffalo Sabres**	80	39	26	15	307	273	1425	93
**Quebec Nordiques**	80	33	31	16	356	345	1757	82
Hartford Whalers	80	21	41	18	264	351	1493	60

Note: GP = Games played, W = Wins, L = Losses, T = Ties, Pts = Points, GF = Goals for, GA = Goals against
Note: Teams that qualified for the playoffs are highlighted in bold.

=== Record vs. opponents ===
Adams Division record vs. opponents

==== Vs. Wales Conference ====
**Vs. Adams Division**

1981–82 NHL records
Team	**BOS**	**BUF**	**HFD**	**MTL**	**QUE**	**Total**
Boston	—	5–2–1	4–2–2	0–7–1	4–4	**13–15–4**
Buffalo	2–5–1	—	4–1–3	3–2–3	4–3–1	**13–11–8**
Hartford	2–4–2	1–4–3	—	0–7–1	2–3–3	**5–18–9**
Montreal	7–0–1	2–3–3	7–0–1	—	3–3–2	**19–6–7**
Quebec	4–4	3–4–1	3–2–3	3–3–2	—	**13–13–6**

**Vs. Patrick Division**

1981–82 NHL records
Team	**NYI**	**NYR**	**PHI**	**PIT**	**WSH**	**Total**
Boston	2–1	2–1	1–2	1–1–1	3–0	**9–5–1**
Buffalo	2–1	0–2–1	1–2	2–1	3–0	**8–6–1**
Hartford	0–2–1	1–1–1	0−3	0–2–1	1–2	**2–10–3**
Montreal	1–2	2–1	2–1	2–1	1–2	**8–7–0**
Quebec	1–1–1	1–1–1	1–1–1	0–3	2–0–1	**5–6–4**

==== Vs. Campbell Conference ====
**Vs. Norris Division**

1981–82 NHL records
Team	**CHI**	**DET**	**MIN**	**STL**	**TOR**	**WIN**	**Total**
Boston	1−2	2−0−1	1−2	1−1–1	3−0	3−0	**11−5−2**
Buffalo	2−1	3−0	1−1−1	2−1	2−0−1	1−0−2	**11−3−4**
Hartford	1–1–1	2–0–1	1–2	2–1	3–0	2−1	**11−5−2**
Montreal	2−0−1	2−1	1–0−2	2−0−1	2–0−1	1−0−2	**10−1−7**
Quebec	2−1	3−0	0−2–1	2−1	1−1–1	2−0−1	**10−5−3**

**Vs. Smythe Division**

1981–82 NHL records
Team	**CGY**	**COL**	**EDM**	**LAK**	**VAN**	**Total**
Boston	1−1−1	3−0	1−0–2	3−0	2−1	**10−2−3**
Buffalo	0−2−1	3–0	1−2	2−1	1−1−1	**7−6−2**
Hartford	1–2	0–2–1	0–2–1	2–0–1	0–2–1	**3–8–4**
Montreal	2−1	2−0−1	1−0−2	2–1	2−1	**9−3−3**
Quebec	0−3	2−1	2−1	0–1–2	1–1−1	**5−7−3**

== Schedule and results ==
1981–82 regular season
October

Game	Result	Date	Score	Opponent	Record
1	L	October 8, 1981	5–7	Quebec Nordiques (1981–82)	0–1–0
2	T	October 10, 1981	1–1	@ Hartford Whalers (1981–82)	0–1–1
3	W	October 11, 1981	6–3	Washington Capitals (1981–82)	1–1–1
4	W	October 14, 1981	8–5	@ Chicago Black Hawks (1981–82)	2–1–1
5	W	October 16, 1981	6–1	@ Colorado Rockies (1981–82)	3–1–1
6	W	October 17, 1981	5–4	@ Los Angeles Kings (1981–82)	4–1–1
7	W	October 20, 1981	4–3	@ St. Louis Blues (1981–82)	5–1–1
8	T	October 22, 1981	2–2	@ Detroit Red Wings (1981–82)	5–1–2
9	L	October 24, 1981	0–7	@ Montreal Canadiens (1981–82)	5–2–2
10	T	October 29, 1981	5–5	Montreal Canadiens (1981–82)	5–2–3
11	W	October 31, 1981	7–3	New York Rangers (1981–82)	6–2–3

November

Game	Result	Date	Score	Opponent	Record
12	W	November 1, 1981	4–1	Hartford Whalers (1981–82)	7–2–3
13	W	November 5, 1981	2–1	Vancouver Canucks (1981–82)	8–2–3
14	W	November 7, 1981	10–1	@ Quebec Nordiques (1981–82)	9–2–3
15	L	November 8, 1981	1–4	Minnesota North Stars (1981–82)	9–3–3
16	W	November 12, 1981	5–2	Edmonton Oilers (1981–82)	10–3–3
17	T	November 14, 1981	3–3	Pittsburgh Penguins (1981–82)	10–3–4
18	L	November 15, 1981	1–3	@ Buffalo Sabres (1981–82)	10–4–4
19	W	November 19, 1981	6–1	Hartford Whalers (1981–82)	11–4–4
20	W	November 21, 1981	5–3	@ Toronto Maple Leafs (1981–82)	12–4–4
21	L	November 22, 1981	1–6	Quebec Nordiques (1981–82)	12–5–4
22	L	November 24, 1981	1–3	@ New York Islanders (1981–82)	12–6–4
23	L	November 26, 1981	1–3	Philadelphia Flyers (1981–82)	12–7–4
24	W	November 28, 1981	5–4	New York Islanders (1981–82)	13–7–4

December

Game	Result	Date	Score	Opponent	Record
25	W	December 3, 1981	6–3	Buffalo Sabres (1981–82)	14–7–4
26	W	December 5, 1981	5–3	@ Quebec Nordiques (1981–82)	15–7–4
27	W	December 9, 1981	4–3	@ New York Rangers (1981–82)	16–7–4
28	L	December 10, 1981	2–3	St. Louis Blues (1981–82)	16–8–4
29	W	December 13, 1981	5–1	Colorado Rockies (1981–82)	17–8–4
30	L	December 17, 1981	1–5	Montreal Canadiens (1981–82)	17–9–4
31	L	December 19, 1981	2–5	@ Montreal Canadiens (1981–82)	17–10–4
32	W	December 20, 1981	6–4	Los Angeles Kings (1981–82)	18–10–4
33	W	December 23, 1981	7–4	@ Washington Capitals (1981–82)	19–10–4
34	W	December 26, 1981	9–6	@ Hartford Whalers (1981–82)	20–10–4
35	W	December 29, 1981	5–3	@ Vancouver Canucks (1981–82)	21–10–4
36	W	December 30, 1981	4–2	@ Calgary Flames (1981–82)	22–10–4

January

Game	Result	Date	Score	Opponent	Record
37	T	January 2, 1982	4–4	@ Edmonton Oilers (1981–82)	22–10–5
38	W	January 3, 1982	8–5	@ Winnipeg Jets (1981–82)	23–10–5
39	L	January 5, 1982	1–3	@ Montreal Canadiens (1981–82)	23–11–5
40	W	January 7, 1982	8–6	Winnipeg Jets (1981–82)	24–11–5
41	L	January 9, 1982	1–6	@ Quebec Nordiques (1981–82)	24–12–5
42	W	January 11, 1982	5–2	Toronto Maple Leafs (1981–82)	25–12–5
43	W	January 14, 1982	5–4	New York Islanders (1981–82)	26–12–5
44	T	January 16, 1982	3–3	Hartford Whalers (1981–82)	26–12–6
45	L	January 17, 1982	3–7	@ Philadelphia Flyers (1981–82)	26–13–6
46	L	January 20, 1982	4–5	@ Pittsburgh Penguins (1981–82)	26–14–6
47	W	January 21, 1982	4–2	Toronto Maple Leafs (1981–82)	27–14–6
48	W	January 23, 1982	3–1	Washington Capitals (1981–82)	28–14–6
49	T	January 25, 1982	3–3	Calgary Flames (1981–82)	28–14–7
50	L	January 28, 1982	3–6	Montreal Canadiens (1981–82)	28–15–7
51	L	January 30, 1982	2–3	@ Hartford Whalers (1981–82)	28–16–7
52	W	January 31, 1982	4–2	Colorado Rockies (1981–82)	29–16–7

February

Game	Result	Date	Score	Opponent	Record
53	W	February 3, 1982	5–2	@ Buffalo Sabres (1981–82)	30–16–7
54	W	February 4, 1982	5–2	Buffalo Sabres (1981–82)	31–16–7
55	L	February 6, 1982	3–4	Chicago Black Hawks (1981–82)	31–17–7
56	W	February 11, 1982	4–2	@ Minnesota North Stars (1981–82)	32–17–7
57	L	February 13, 1982	3–6	@ Calgary Flames (1981–82)	32–18–7
58	T	February 14, 1982	2–2	@ Edmonton Oilers (1981–82)	32–18–8
59	L	February 17, 1982	3–6	@ Vancouver Canucks (1981–82)	32–19–8
60	W	February 20, 1982	7–5	@ Detroit Red Wings (1981–82)	33–19–8
61	W	February 21, 1982	1–0	@ Philadelphia Flyers (1981–82)	34–19–8
62	L	February 24, 1982	3–4	@ Hartford Whalers (1981–82)	34–20–8
63	L	February 27, 1982	4–6	New York Rangers (1981–82)	34–21–8

March

Game	Result	Date	Score	Opponent	Record
64	T	March 2, 1982	2–2	@ St. Louis Blues (1981–82)	34–21–9
65	W	March 3, 1982	3–2	@ Pittsburgh Penguins (1981–82)	35–21–9
66	W	March 6, 1982	4–0	Los Angeles Kings (1981–82)	36–21–9
67	L	March 7, 1982	1–5	@ Chicago Black Hawks (1981–82)	36–22–9
68	L	March 9, 1982	2–4	@ Montreal Canadiens (1981–82)	36–23–9
69	W	March 11, 1982	7–4	Winnipeg Jets (1981–82)	37–23–9
70	W	March 13, 1982	5–3	Detroit Red Wings (1981–82)	38–23–9
71	L	March 14, 1982	2–5	Montreal Canadiens (1981–82)	38–24–9
72	T	March 16, 1982	3–3	@ Buffalo Sabres (1981–82)	38–24–10
73	W	March 20, 1982	6–4	Buffalo Sabres (1981–82)	39–24–10
74	W	March 22, 1982	5–4	Quebec Nordiques (1981–82)	40–24–10
75	W	March 25, 1982	5–1	Buffalo Sabres (1981–82)	41–24–10
76	L	March 27, 1982	5–6	Minnesota North Stars (1981–82)	41–25–10
77	L	March 28, 1982	5–9	@ Buffalo Sabres (1981–82)	41–26–10

April

Game	Result	Date	Score	Opponent	Record
78	L	April 1, 1982	5–8	Quebec Nordiques (1981–82)	41–27–10
79	W	April 3, 1982	5–4	@ Quebec Nordiques (1981–82)	42–27–10
80	W	April 4, 1982	7–2	Hartford Whalers (1981–82)	43–27–10

Legend: Win (2 points) Loss (0 points) Tie (1 point)

== Player statistics ==
=== Regular season ===
Scoring

Player	Pos	GP	G	A	Pts	PIM	+/-	PPG	SHG	GWG
Rick Middleton	RW	75	51	43	94	12	15	19	1	9
Barry Pederson	C	80	44	48	92	53	27	13	4	7
Peter McNab	C	80	36	40	76	19	0	11	1	5
Raymond Bourque	D	65	17	49	66	51	22	4	0	2
Brad Park	D	75	14	42	56	82	11	8	0	1
Terry O'Reilly	RW	70	22	30	52	213	23	0	1	3
Steve Kasper	C	73	20	31	51	72	-18	1	3	3
Keith Crowder	RW	71	23	21	44	101	0	0	0	1
Wayne Cashman	LW	64	12	31	43	59	-17	3	0	1
Tom Fergus	C	61	15	24	39	12	15	2	0	2
Mike O'Connell	D	80	5	34	39	75	8	1	0	0
Don Marcotte	LW	69	13	21	34	14	-2	0	0	3
Normand Leveille	LW	66	14	19	33	49	16	1	0	4
Bruce Crowder	RW	63	16	11	27	31	-7	1	0	1
Stan Jonathan	LW	67	6	17	23	57	6	1	0	0
Mike Gillis	LW	53	9	8	17	54	10	0	0	0
Mike Milbury	D	51	2	10	12	71	10	0	0	1
Brad McCrimmon	D	78	1	8	9	83	4	0	0	0
Randy Hillier	D	25	0	8	8	29	6	0	0	0
Larry Melnyk	D	48	0	8	8	84	3	0	0	0
Mike Krushelnyski	LW/C	17	3	3	6	2	0	0	1	0
Marco Baron	G	44	0	2	2	35	0	0	0	0
Craig MacTavish	C	2	0	1	1	0	0	0	0	0
Rogie Vachon	G	38	0	1	1	0	0	0	0	0
Dave Barr	RW	2	0	0	0	0	0	0	0	0
Mike Moffat	G	2	0	0	0	0	0	0	0	0
Doug Morrison	RW	3	0	0	0	0	-2	0	0	0
Dick Redmond	D	17	0	0	0	4	-7	0	0	0

Goaltending

Player	MIN	GP	W	L	T	GA	GAA	SO
Marco Baron	2515	44	22	16	4	144	3.44	1
Rogie Vachon	2165	38	19	11	6	132	3.66	1
Mike Moffat	120	2	2	0	0	6	3.00	0
Team:	4800	80	43	27	10	282	3.53	2

=== Playoffs ===
Scoring

Player	Pos	GP	G	A	Pts	PIM	PPG	SHG	GWG
Barry Pederson	C	11	7	11	18	2	1	0	2
Rick Middleton	RW	11	6	9	15	0	2	0	0
Peter McNab	C	11	6	8	14	6	2	0	1
Terry O'Reilly	RW	11	5	4	9	56	0	0	1
Steve Kasper	C	11	3	6	9	22	1	0	0
Bruce Crowder	RW	11	5	3	8	9	1	0	0
Raymond Bourque	D	9	1	5	6	16	0	0	1
Brad Park	D	11	1	4	5	4	0	0	1
Keith Crowder	RW	11	2	2	4	14	0	0	0
Mike O'Connell	D	11	2	2	4	20	0	0	0
Don Marcotte	LW	11	0	4	4	10	0	0	0
Mike Milbury	D	11	0	4	4	6	0	0	0
Tom Fergus	C	6	3	0	3	0	2	0	0
Mike Gillis	LW	11	1	2	3	6	0	0	0
Larry Melnyk	D	11	0	3	3	40	0	0	0
Wayne Cashman	LW	9	0	2	2	6	0	0	0
Dave Barr	RW	5	1	0	1	0	0	0	0
Randy Hillier	D	8	0	1	1	16	0	0	0
Mike Moffat	G	11	0	1	1	8	0	0	0
Stan Jonathan	LW	11	0	0	0	6	0	0	0
Mike Krushelnyski	LW/C	1	0	0	0	2	0	0	0
Brad McCrimmon	D	2	0	0	0	2	0	0	0
Dick Redmond	D	2	0	0	0	0	0	0	0
Rogie Vachon	G	1	0	0	0	0	0	0	0

Goaltending

Player	MIN	GP	W	L	GA	GAA	SO
Mike Moffat	663	11	6	5	38	3.44	0
Rogie Vachon	20	1	0	0	1	3.00	0
Team:	683	11	6	5	39	3.43	0

Note:

Pos = Position;GP = Games played; G = Goals; A = Assists; Pts = Points; PIM = Penalty minutes; +/- = Plus/minus; PPG = Power-play goals; SHG = Short-handed goals; GWG = Game-winning goals
Pos = Position;GP = Games played; Min, TOI = Minutes played; W = Wins; L = Losses; T,T/OT = Ties; OTL = Overtime losses; GA = Goals-against; GAA = Goals-against average; SO = Shutouts; SA = Shots against; SV = Shots saved;SV% = Save percentage;

== Draft picks ==
Boston's draft picks at the 1981 NHL entry draft held at the Montreal Forum in Montreal.

Round	#	Player	Nationality	College/Junior/Club team (League)
1	14	Normand Leveille	Canada	Chicoutimi Saguenéens (QMJHL)
2	35	Luc Dufour	Canada	Chicoutimi Saguenéens (QMJHL)
4	77	Scott McLellan	Canada	Niagara Falls Flyers (OMJHL)
5	98	Joe Mantione	Canada	Cornwall Royals (QMJHL)
6	119	Bruce Milton	United States	Boston University (ECAC)
7	140	Mats Thelin	Sweden	AIK (Sweden)
8	161	Armel Parisee	Canada	Chicoutimi Saguenéens (QMJHL)
9	182	Don Sylvestri	Canada	Clarkson University (ECAC)
10	203	Richard Bourque	Canada	Sherbrooke Castors (QMJHL)

== See also ==
- 1981–82 NHL season
