= 1981–82 St. Louis Blues season =

National Hockey League team season

1981–82 St. Louis Blues
- Division: 3rd Norris
- Conference: 6th Campbell
- 1981–82 record: 32–40–8
- Home record: 22–14–4
- Road record: 10–26–4
- Goals for: 315
- Goals against: 349

Team information
- General manager: Emile Francis
- Coach: Red Berenson, Emile Francis
- Captain: Brian Sutter
- Alternate captains: None
- Arena: Checkerdome
- Minor league affiliate: Salt Lake Golden Eagles (CHL)

Team leaders
- Goals: Brian Sutter (39)
- Assists: Bernie Federko (62)
- Points: Bernie Federko (92)
- Penalty minutes: Brian Sutter (239)
- Wins: Mike Liut (28)
- Goals against average: Mike Liut (4.07)

The 1981–82 St. Louis Blues season was the 15th for the franchise in St. Louis, Missouri. The Blues finished the regular-season with a record of 32 wins, 40 losses and eight ties, good for 72 points, and qualified for the playoffs with their third-place finish. The Blues defeated the Jets, three games to one in the division semi-finals, before losing the Norris Division final to the Black Hawks in six games.

== Offseason ==
Prior to the season, realignment took place in the NHL, as the Blues were assigned to the new-look James Norris Division in the Clarence Campbell Conference, along with the Chicago Black Hawks, Detroit Red Wings, Minnesota North Stars, Toronto Maple Leafs and the Winnipeg Jets.

== Regular season ==
=== Final standings ===
Norris Division
	GP	W	L	T	GF	GA	Pts
**Minnesota North Stars**	80	37	23	20	346	288	94
**Winnipeg Jets**	80	33	33	14	319	332	80
**St. Louis Blues**	80	32	40	8	315	349	72
**Chicago Black Hawks**	80	30	38	12	332	363	72
Toronto Maple Leafs	80	20	44	16	298	380	56
Detroit Red Wings	80	21	47	12	270	351	54

Note: GP = Games played, W = Wins, L = Losses, T = Ties, Pts = Points, GF = Goals for, GA = Goals against
Note: Teams that qualified for the playoffs are highlighted in bold.

=== Record vs. opponents ===
Norris Division record vs. opponents

==== Vs. Campbell Conference ====
**Vs. Norris Division**

1981–82 NHL records
Team	**CHI**	**DET**	**MIN**	**STL**	**TOR**	**WIN**	**Total**
Chicago	—	3−3−1	3−3−1	2−4−1	3−4	2−3−2	13−17−5
Detroit	3−3−1	—	1−6	2−5	3−3−1	2−3−2	11−20−4
Minnesota	3−3−1	6−1	—	3−3−1	4−0−3	3−3−1	19−10−6
St. Louis	4−2−1	5−2	3−3−1	—	5−2	1−4−2	18−13−4
Toronto	4−3	3−3−1	0−4−3	2−5	—	2−4−1	11−19−5
Winnipeg	3−2−2	3−2−2	3−3−1	4−1−2	4−2−1	—	17−10−8

**Vs. Smythe Division**

1981–82 NHL records
Team	**CGY**	**COL**	**EDM**	**LAK**	**VAN**	**Total**
Chicago	2−0−1	1−2	1−1−1	3−0	1−2	8−5−2
Detroit	1−1−1	3−0	0−2−1	1−2	1−1−1	6−6−3
Minnesota	1−0−2	1−0−2	0−2−1	2−0−1	1−1−1	5−3−7
St. Louis	2−1	2−1	0−3	1−2	2−1	7−8−0
Toronto	0−1−2	1−0−2	1−2	2−1	0−2−1	4−6−5
Winnipeg	2−1	2−1	1−2	3−0	1−2	9−6−0

**Vs. Wales Conference**

**Vs. Adams Division**

1981–82 NHL records
Team	**BOS**	**BUF**	**HFD**	**MTL**	**QUE**	**Total**
Chicago	2−1	1−2	1−1−1	0−2−1	1−2	5−8−2
Detroit	0−2−1	0−3	0−2−1	1−2	0−3	1−12−2
Minnesota	2−1	1−1−1	2−1	0−1−2	2−0−1	7−4−4
St. Louis	1−1−1	1−2	1−2	0−2−1	1−2	4−9−2
Toronto	0−3	0−2−1	0−3	0−2−1	1−1−1	1−11−3
Winnipeg	0−3	0−1−2	1−2	0−1−2	0−2−1	1−9−5

**Vs. Patrick Division**

1981–82 NHL records
Team	**NYI**	**NYR**	**PHI**	**PIT**	**WSH**	**Total**
Chicago	0−3	0−3	1−1−1	1−0−2	2−1	4−8−3
Detroit	0−3	1−2	0−2−1	2−1	0−1−2	3−9−3
Minnesota	0−2−1	1−2	1−1−1	2−1	2−0−1	6−6−3
St. Louis	0−2−1	0−2−1	0−3	2−1	1−2	3−10−2
Toronto	0−3	1−1−1	1−2	1−0−2	1−2	4−8−3
Winnipeg	1−2	1−1−1	2–1	1–2	1−2	6–8–1

== Schedule and results ==
1981–82 regular season
October

Game	Result	Date	Score	Opponent	Record
1	W	October 6, 1981	6–2	Pittsburgh Penguins (1981–82)	1–0–0
2	L	October 10, 1981	4–6	Calgary Flames (1981–82)	1–1–0
3	L	October 15, 1981	3–6	@ Detroit Red Wings (1981–82)	1–2–0
4	W	October 17, 1981	7–3	Chicago Black Hawks (1981–82)	2–2–0
5	L	October 18, 1981	3–5	@ New York Rangers (1981–82)	2–3–0
6	L	October 20, 1981	3–4	Boston Bruins (1981–82)	2–4–0
7	T	October 22, 1981	5–5	@ Minnesota North Stars (1981–82)	2–4–1
8	L	October 24, 1981	3–6	Philadelphia Flyers (1981–82)	2–5–1
9	T	October 25, 1981	4–4	@ Chicago Black Hawks (1981–82)	2–5–2
10	W	October 27, 1981	7–5	Toronto Maple Leafs (1981–82)	3–5–2
11	L	October 28, 1981	2–6	@ Buffalo Sabres (1981–82)	3–6–2
12	W	October 31, 1981	5–4	Los Angeles Kings (1981–82)	4–6–2

November

Game	Result	Date	Score	Opponent	Record
13	L	November 4, 1981	2–6	@ Quebec Nordiques (1981–82)	4–7–2
14	L	November 5, 1981	3–4	@ Montreal Canadiens (1981–82)	4–8–2
15	W	November 7, 1981	4–2	Calgary Flames (1981–82)	5–8–2
16	W	November 10, 1981	7–0	@ Calgary Flames (1981–82)	6–8–2
17	L	November 12, 1981	2–5	@ Los Angeles Kings (1981–82)	6–9–2
18	W	November 14, 1981	4–2	@ Colorado Rockies (1981–82)	7–9–2
19	L	November 17, 1981	1–5	Edmonton Oilers (1981–82)	7–10–2
20	L	November 18, 1981	1–6	@ Pittsburgh Penguins (1981–82)	7–11–2
21	T	November 21, 1981	1–1	Winnipeg Jets (1981–82)	7–11–3
22	L	November 22, 1981	4–5	@ Winnipeg Jets (1981–82)	7–12–3
23	T	November 24, 1981	2–2	Montreal Canadiens (1981–82)	7–12–4
24	L	November 26, 1981	2–9	@ New York Islanders (1981–82)	7–13–4
25	W	November 28, 1981	4–2	Colorado Rockies (1981–82)	8–13–4

December

Game	Result	Date	Score	Opponent	Record
26	W	December 1, 1981	7–5	Detroit Red Wings (1981–82)	9–13–4
27	W	December 5, 1981	3–1	Pittsburgh Penguins (1981–82)	10–13–4
28	L	December 6, 1981	2–8	@ Philadelphia Flyers (1981–82)	10–14–4
29	L	December 9, 1981	1–5	@ Hartford Whalers (1981–82)	10–15–4
30	W	December 10, 1981	3–2	@ Boston Bruins (1981–82)	11–15–4
31	W	December 12, 1981	6–4	@ Quebec Nordiques (1981–82)	12–15–4
32	W	December 15, 1981	4–2	Minnesota North Stars (1981–82)	13–15–4
33	W	December 19, 1981	5–0	Vancouver Canucks (1981–82)	14–15–4
34	L	December 20, 1981	4–5	@ Winnipeg Jets (1981–82)	14–16–4
35	W	December 22, 1981	3–2	Buffalo Sabres (1981–82)	15–16–4
36	L	December 26, 1981	3–6	@ Minnesota North Stars (1981–82)	15–17–4
37	W	December 27, 1981	4–3	@ Chicago Black Hawks (1981–82)	16–17–4
38	W	December 29, 1981	6–1	Hartford Whalers (1981–82)	17–17–4
39	W	December 30, 1981	6–4	@ Toronto Maple Leafs (1981–82)	18–17–4

January

Game	Result	Date	Score	Opponent	Record
40	L	January 2, 1982	3–5	Philadelphia Flyers (1981–82)	18–18–4
41	W	January 5, 1982	4–1	Minnesota North Stars (1981–82)	19–18–4
42	L	January 8, 1982	1–7	@ Colorado Rockies (1981–82)	19–19–4
43	W	January 9, 1982	7–4	Washington Capitals (1981–82)	20–19–4
44	L	January 13, 1982	2–4	Quebec Nordiques (1981–82)	20–20–4
45	W	January 16, 1982	8–6	Chicago Black Hawks (1981–82)	21–20–4
46	W	January 19, 1982	5–4	@ Vancouver Canucks (1981–82)	22–20–4
47	L	January 20, 1982	6–8	@ Edmonton Oilers (1981–82)	22–21–4
48	W	January 23, 1982	6–2	Toronto Maple Leafs (1981–82)	23–21–4
49	L	January 26, 1982	4–6	Edmonton Oilers (1981–82)	23–22–4
50	W	January 28, 1982	8–3	Minnesota North Stars (1981–82)	24–22–4
51	L	January 30, 1982	4–7	@ Los Angeles Kings (1981–82)	24–23–4

February

Game	Result	Date	Score	Opponent	Record
52	W	February 2, 1982	10–6	Winnipeg Jets (1981–82)	25–23–4
53	L	February 3, 1982	5–9	@ Chicago Black Hawks (1981–82)	25–24–4
54	L	February 6, 1982	2–4	Hartford Whalers (1981–82)	25–25–4
55	L	February 7, 1982	5–8	@ Detroit Red Wings (1981–82)	25–26–4
56	T	February 10, 1982	3–3	New York Rangers (1981–82)	25–26–5
57	L	February 13, 1982	2–3	Vancouver Canucks (1981–82)	25–27–5
58	L	February 16, 1982	1–2	Buffalo Sabres (1981–82)	25–28–5
59	L	February 18, 1982	3–5	@ Montreal Canadiens (1981–82)	25–29–5
60	L	February 20, 1982	5–8	@ Toronto Maple Leafs (1981–82)	25–30–5
61	W	February 23, 1982	3–2	Toronto Maple Leafs (1981–82)	26–30–5
62	L	February 25, 1982	1–9	@ Washington Capitals (1981–82)	26–31–5
63	W	February 27, 1982	6–2	Detroit Red Wings (1981–82)	27–31–5
64	L	February 28, 1982	2–5	@ Winnipeg Jets (1981–82)	27–32–5

March

Game	Result	Date	Score	Opponent	Record
65	T	March 2, 1982	2–2	Boston Bruins (1981–82)	27–32–6
66	L	March 3, 1982	4–8	@ Washington Capitals (1981–82)	27–33–6
67	W	March 6, 1982	5–1	Detroit Red Wings (1981–82)	28–33–6
68	L	March 8, 1982	1–8	@ Minnesota North Stars (1981–82)	28–34–6
69	L	March 9, 1982	4–6	New York Islanders (1981–82)	28–35–6
70	L	March 13, 1982	2–3	Minnesota North Stars (1981–82)	28–36–6
71	L	March 16, 1982	3–7	Winnipeg Jets (1981–82)	28–37–6
72	W	March 18, 1982	7–4	@ Detroit Red Wings (1981–82)	29–37–6
73	T	March 20, 1982	3–3	@ New York Islanders (1981–82)	29–37–7
74	L	March 21, 1982	5–8	@ New York Rangers (1981–82)	29–38–7
75	L	March 24, 1982	3–4	@ Toronto Maple Leafs (1981–82)	29–39–7
76	T	March 26, 1982	4–4	@ Winnipeg Jets (1981–82)	29–39–8
77	W	March 28, 1982	8–3	@ Chicago Black Hawks (1981–82)	30–39–8
78	W	March 30, 1982	5–3	Toronto Maple Leafs (1981–82)	31–39–8

April

Game	Result	Date	Score	Opponent	Record
79	L	April 3, 1982	4–7	Chicago Black Hawks (1981–82)	31–40–8
80	W	April 4, 1982	3–2	@ Detroit Red Wings (1981–82)	32–40–8

Legend: Win (2 points) Loss (0 points) Tie (1 point)

== Player statistics ==
=== Regular season ===
Scoring

Player	Pos	GP	G	A	Pts	PIM	+/-	PPG	SHG	GWG
Bernie Federko	C	74	30	62	92	70	-10	11	0	6
Blake Dunlop	C	77	25	53	78	32	-9	10	1	1
Brian Sutter	LW	74	39	36	75	239	-2	14	0	3
Jorgen Pettersson	LW	77	38	31	69	28	-8	8	0	2
Perry Turnbull	C	79	33	26	59	161	-15	2	0	2
Joe Mullen	RW	45	25	34	59	4	11	10	0	3
Mike Zuke	C	76	13	40	53	41	-18	1	1	2
Wayne Babych	RW	51	19	25	44	51	-12	4	0	3
Tony Currie	RW	48	18	22	40	17	-7	4	0	2
Jack Brownschidle	D	80	5	33	38	26	-5	3	0	1
Mike Crombeen	RW	71	19	8	27	32	-10	0	1	1
Larry Patey	C	70	14	12	26	97	-10	1	4	2
Rick Lapointe	D	71	2	20	22	127	-6	0	0	0
Jim Nill	RW	61	9	12	21	127	-13	1	2	0
Rik Wilson	D	48	3	18	21	24	-10	1	0	1
Blair Chapman	RW	18	6	11	17	8	1	2	0	0
Ed Kea	D	78	2	14	16	62	19	0	0	0
Joe Micheletti	D	20	3	11	14	28	-2	2	0	0
Jim Pavese	D	42	2	9	11	101	-14	0	0	1
Ralph Klassen	C	45	3	7	10	6	-3	0	1	1
Bill Baker	D	35	3	5	8	50	-8	1	0	0
Kari Eloranta	D	12	1	7	8	6	5	1	0	1
Guy Lapointe	D	8	0	6	6	4	-3	0	0	0
Bill Stewart	D	22	0	5	5	25	-5	0	0	0
Mark Reeds	RW	9	1	3	4	0	3	0	0	0
Perry Anderson	LW	5	1	2	3	0	1	0	0	0
Alain Vigneault	D	14	1	2	3	43	-1	0	0	0
Richie Hansen	C	2	0	2	2	0	2	0	0	0
Mike Liut	G	64	0	2	2	2	0	0	0	0
Bob Crawford	RW	3	0	1	1	0	-4	0	0	0
Gary Edwards	G	10	0	1	1	0	0	0	0	0
Gerry Hart	D	35	0	1	1	102	-5	0	0	0
Alain Lemieux	C	3	0	1	1	0	-1	0	0	0
Scott Campbell	D	3	0	0	0	52	-1	0	0	0
Glen Hanlon	G	2	0	0	0	0	0	0	0	0
Rick Heinz	G	9	0	0	0	0	0	0	0	0
Neil LaBatte	C/D	4	0	0	0	6	-3	0	0	0
Paul Skidmore	G	2	0	0	0	0	0	0	0	0

Goaltending

Player	MIN	GP	W	L	T	GA	GAA	SO
Mike Liut	3691	64	28	28	7	250	4.06	2
Rick Heinz	433	9	2	5	0	35	4.85	0
Gary Edwards	480	10	1	5	1	45	5.63	0
Paul Skidmore	120	2	1	1	0	6	3.00	0
Glen Hanlon	76	2	0	1	0	8	6.32	0
Team:	4800	80	32	40	8	344	4.30	2

=== Playoffs ===
Scoring

Player	Pos	GP	G	A	Pts	PIM	PPG	SHG	GWG
Joe Mullen	RW	10	7	11	18	4	1	0	0
Bernie Federko	C	10	3	15	18	10	1	0	1
Brian Sutter	LW	10	8	6	14	49	0	0	1
Larry Patey	C	10	2	4	6	13	0	1	0
Wayne Babych	RW	7	3	2	5	8	0	0	1
Perry Turnbull	C	5	3	2	5	11	1	0	0
Mike Crombeen	RW	10	3	1	4	20	0	0	1
Blake Dunlop	C	10	2	2	4	4	0	0	0
Ralph Klassen	C	10	2	2	4	10	0	0	0
Jorgen Pettersson	LW	7	1	2	3	0	1	0	0
Gerry Hart	D	10	0	3	3	33	0	0	0
Jim Pavese	D	3	0	3	3	2	0	0	0
Rik Wilson	D	9	0	3	3	14	0	0	0
Perry Anderson	LW	10	2	0	2	4	1	0	0
Ed Kea	D	10	1	1	2	16	0	0	0
Mike Zuke	C	8	1	1	2	2	0	0	0
Jack Brownschidle	D	8	0	2	2	14	0	0	0
Guy Lapointe	D	7	1	0	1	8	1	0	1
Mark Reeds	RW	10	0	1	1	2	0	0	0
Bill Baker	D	4	0	0	0	0	0	0	0
Blair Chapman	RW	3	0	0	0	0	0	0	0
Kari Eloranta	D	5	0	0	0	0	0	0	0
Glen Hanlon	G	3	0	0	0	0	0	0	0
Rick Lapointe	D	3	0	0	0	6	0	0	0
Mike Liut	G	10	0	0	0	0	0	0	0

Goaltending

Player	MIN	GP	W	L	GA	GAA	SO
Mike Liut	494	10	5	3	27	3.28	0
Glen Hanlon	109	3	0	2	9	4.95	0
Team:	603	10	5	5	36	3.58	0

Note:

Pos = Position;GP = Games played; G = Goals; A = Assists; Pts = Points; PIM = Penalty minutes; +/- = Plus/minus; PPG = Power-play goals; SHG = Short-handed goals; GWG = Game-winning goals
Pos = Position;GP = Games played; Min, TOI = Minutes played; W = Wins; L = Losses; T,T/OT = Ties; OTL = Overtime losses; GA = Goals-against; GAA = Goals-against average; SO = Shutouts; SA = Shots against; SV = Shots saved;SV% = Save percentage;

== Draft picks ==
St. Louis's draft picks at the 1981 NHL entry draft held at the Montreal Forum in Montreal.

Round	#	Player	Nationality	College/Junior/Club team (League)
1	20	Marty Ruff	Canada	Lethbridge Broncos (WHL)
2	36	Hakan Nordin	Canada	Färjestad BK (Sweden)
3	62	Gord Donnelly	Canada	Sherbrooke Castors (QMJHL)
5	104	Mike Hickey	Canada	Sudbury Wolves (OMJHL)
6	125	Peter Aslin	Sweden	AIK (Sweden)
7	146	Erik Holmberg	Sweden	Södertälje SK (Sweden)
8	167	Alain Vigneault	Canada	Trois-Rivières Draveurs (OMJHL)
9	188	Dan Wood	Canada	Kingston Canadians (OMJHL)
10	209	Richard Zemlak	Canada	Spokane Flyers (WHL)

== See also ==
- 1981–82 NHL season
