= 1981–82 NHL season =

National Hockey League season

- League: National Hockey League
- Sport: Ice hockey
- Duration: October 6, 1981 – May 16, 1982
- Games: 80
- Teams: 21
- TV partner(s): CBC, SRC (Canada); USA, ESPN (United States)

Draft
- Top draft pick: Dale Hawerchuk
- Picked by: Winnipeg Jets

Regular season
- Season champions: New York Islanders
- Season MVP: Wayne Gretzky (Oilers)
- Top scorer: Wayne Gretzky (Oilers)

Playoffs
- Playoffs MVP: Mike Bossy (Islanders)

Stanley Cup
- Champions: New York Islanders
- Runners-up: Vancouver Canucks

NHL seasons
- 1980–81 1982–83

The 1981–82 NHL season was the 65th season of the National Hockey League. The teams were realigned into divisions that better reflected their geographic locations. The William M. Jennings Trophy made its debut this year as the trophy for the goaltenders from the team with the fewest goals against, thus replacing the Vezina Trophy in that qualifying criteria. The Vezina Trophy would thereafter be awarded to the goaltender adjudged to be the best at his position. The New York Islanders won their third straight Stanley Cup by sweeping the Vancouver Canucks in four games.

== League business ==
=== Realignment ===
Prior to the start of the season, the divisions of the league were re-aligned to reduce travel costs to better reflect their geographic locations, but the traditional names of the divisions and conferences were retained. The Patrick Division was moved from the Clarence Campbell Conference to the Prince of Wales Conference, while the Norris Division went the other way, going from the Wales Conference to the Campbell Conference. This divisional alignment existed until the 1993–94 season, at which point both the divisions and the conferences of the league were renamed to reflect geography.

The schedule and playoff format were also altered. Previously, each team played every other team four times, and the 16-team playoff format had the four divisional champions joined by 12 wild-cards; for all intents and purposes, the divisions were meaningless. Also, under the old format, teams were paired in the first round based on record (i.e., 1st vs. 16th, 2nd vs. 15th, etc.), and then re-paired in each succeeding round based on record (i.e., highest seeded first round winner vs. lowest seeded first round winner, second highest first round winner vs. second lowest first round winner, etc.)

The new format called for each team in the three five-team divisions to play their four divisional opponents eight times each (32 games) and the remaining 16 league teams three times each (48 games). In addition, each team in the six-team division was to play their five divisional opponents seven times each (35 games) and the remaining 15 league teams three times each (45 games). As to the playoffs, the top four teams in each division qualified — no more wild-cards — with 1st place playing 4th place, and second place playing third place, in the divisional semifinals; the two winners meeting in the divisional finals; followed by the respective conference finals and the Stanley Cup Final. With the exception of the first round changing from a best-of-five to a best-of-seven in 1987, this schedule and playoff arrangement continued until 1993.

Beginning with this season, the Prince of Wales Trophy and the Clarence S. Campbell Bowl were awarded to the Wales Conference (Eastern Conference since 1993) playoffs champion and the Campbell Conference (Western Conference since 1993) playoffs champion, respectively.

=== Entry draft ===
The 1981 NHL entry draft was held on June 10, at the Montreal Forum in Montreal, Quebec. Dale Hawerchuk was selected first overall by the Winnipeg Jets.

== Regular season ==
The New York Islanders led the league with 118 points, seven more than second place Edmonton Oilers. The Islanders also set a league record by winning 15 consecutive games from January 21 to February 20. This was later eclipsed by the Pittsburgh Penguins' 17-game winning streak from March 9 to April 10, 1993. However, the Islanders 15-game winning streak was accomplished before the advent of overtime in the NHL regular season. Two of the Penguins' wins during their streak, the second and 15th, required overtime. These games would have ended in ties under the rules in place during the 1981–82 season, ending the streak.

The Edmonton Oilers' young superstar Wayne Gretzky broke several records, including the record of 50 goals in 50 games, set by Maurice Richard and Mike Bossy, by scoring 50 goals in only 39 games. Gretzky also broke Phil Esposito's record of 76 goals in a season with 92, his own assists record of 109 which was set the prior season with 120, and his own point total of 164 which was also set the prior season with 212. He was the first, and thus far only, player to ever score 200 points in a season. The Oilers set a record for most goals in a season with 417, in which Gretzky scored or assisted on over half.

The New York Islanders' Mike Bossy set a regular season scoring record for right-wingers with 147 points in an 80-game season, and finished as runner-up to Gretzky for the Art Ross Trophy.

This was the final season of the Colorado Rockies before moving to New Jersey to become the Devils. The NHL would return to the Denver area in 1995, when the Quebec Nordiques relocate to become the Colorado Avalanche.

The Winnipeg Jets completed one of the biggest single-season turnarounds in league history as the Jets went from nine wins and 32 points in 1980–81 to 33 wins and 80 points.

The Philadelphia Flyers become the first team to wear long pants. The idea was to create a more streamlined uniform with lighter padding, thus making the players faster. The downside was that the players slid into the boards faster after being bodychecked.

=== Final standings ===
Note: GP = Games played; W = Wins; L = Losses; T = Ties; GF = Goals for; GA = Goals against; Pts = Points; PIM = Penalties in minutes
Note: Teams that qualified for the playoffs are highlighted in bold

==== Prince of Wales Conference ====
Adams Division
	GP	W	L	T	GF	GA	PIM	PTS
**Montreal Canadiens**	80	46	17	17	360	223	1463	109
**Boston Bruins**	80	43	27	10	323	285	1266	96
**Buffalo Sabres**	80	39	26	15	307	273	1425	93
**Quebec Nordiques**	80	33	31	16	356	345	1757	82
Hartford Whalers	80	21	41	18	264	351	1493	60

Patrick Division
	GP	W	L	T	GF	GA	PTS
**New York Islanders**	80	54	16	10	385	250	118
**New York Rangers**	80	39	27	14	316	306	92
**Philadelphia Flyers**	80	38	31	11	325	313	87
**Pittsburgh Penguins**	80	31	36	13	310	337	75
Washington Capitals	80	26	41	13	319	338	65

==== Clarence Campbell Conference ====
Norris Division
	GP	W	L	T	GF	GA	Pts
**Minnesota North Stars**	80	37	23	20	346	288	94
**Winnipeg Jets**	80	33	33	14	319	332	80
**St. Louis Blues**	80	32	40	8	315	349	72
**Chicago Black Hawks**	80	30	38	12	332	363	72
Toronto Maple Leafs	80	20	44	16	298	380	56
Detroit Red Wings	80	21	47	12	270	351	54

Smythe Division
	GP	W	L	T	GF	GA	PTS
**Edmonton Oilers**	80	48	17	15	417	295	111
**Vancouver Canucks**	80	30	33	17	290	286	77
**Calgary Flames**	80	29	34	17	334	345	75
**Los Angeles Kings**	80	24	41	15	314	369	63
Colorado Rockies	80	18	49	13	241	362	49

== Playoffs ==
=== Bracket ===
Under the new postseason format, the top four teams in each division qualified for the playoffs. In the division semifinals, the fourth seeded team in each division played against the division winner from their division. The other series matched the second and third place teams from the divisions. The two winning teams from each division's semifinals then met in the division finals. The two division winners of each conference then played in the conference finals. The two conference winners then advanced to the Stanley Cup Final.

In the division semifinals, teams competed in a best-of-five series. In the other three rounds, teams competed in a best-of-seven series (scores in the bracket indicate the number of games won in each series).

Division semifinals	Division finals
A1	Montreal	2
A4	Quebec	3
A4	Quebec	4
A2	Boston	3
A2	Boston	3
A3	Buffalo	1
Prince of Wales Conference
P1	NY Islanders	3
P4	Pittsburgh	2
P1	NY Islanders	4
P2	NY Rangers	2
P2	NY Rangers	3
P3	Philadelphia	1
N1	Minnesota	1
N4	Chicago	3
N4	Chicago	4
N3	St. Louis	2
N2	Winnipeg	1
N3	St. Louis	3
Clarence Campbell Conference
S1	Edmonton	2
S4	Los Angeles	3
S4	Los Angeles	1
S2	Vancouver	4
S2	Vancouver	3
S3	Calgary	0

Conference finals
A4	Quebec	0
P1	NY Islanders	4
N4	Chicago	1
S2	Vancouver	4

Stanley Cup Final
P1	NY Islanders	4
S2	Vancouver	0

== Awards ==
From this season forward, the Prince of Wales and Clarence S. Campbell trophies were given to the playoff champions of the respective conferences.

1982 NHL awards
Prince of Wales Trophy: (Wales Conference playoff champion)	New York Islanders
Clarence S. Campbell Bowl: (Campbell Conference playoff champion)	Vancouver Canucks
Art Ross Trophy: (Top scorer, regular season)	Wayne Gretzky, Edmonton Oilers
Bill Masterton Memorial Trophy: (Perseverance, sportsmanship, and dedication)	Glenn Resch, Colorado Rockies
Calder Memorial Trophy: (Best first-year player)	Dale Hawerchuk, Winnipeg Jets
Conn Smythe Trophy: (Most valuable player, playoffs)	Mike Bossy, New York Islanders
Frank J. Selke Trophy: (Best defensive forward)	Steve Kasper, Boston Bruins
Hart Memorial Trophy: (Most valuable player, regular season)	Wayne Gretzky, Edmonton Oilers
Jack Adams Award: (Best coach)	Tom Watt, Winnipeg Jets
James Norris Memorial Trophy: (Best defenceman)	Doug Wilson, Chicago Black Hawks
Lady Byng Memorial Trophy: (Excellence and sportsmanship)	Rick Middleton, Boston Bruins
Lester B. Pearson Award: (Outstanding player, regular season)	Wayne Gretzky, Edmonton Oilers
William M. Jennings Trophy: (Goaltender(s) of team(s) with best goaltending record)	Rick Wamsley, Denis Herron, Montreal Canadiens
Vezina Trophy: (Best goaltender)	Billy Smith, New York Islanders

=== All-Star teams ===
First Team	Position	Second Team
Billy Smith, New York Islanders	G	Grant Fuhr, Edmonton Oilers
Doug Wilson, Chicago Black Hawks	D	Paul Coffey, Edmonton Oilers
Ray Bourque, Boston Bruins	D	Brian Engblom, Montreal Canadiens
Wayne Gretzky, Edmonton Oilers	C	Bryan Trottier, New York Islanders
Mike Bossy, New York Islanders	RW	Rick Middleton, Boston Bruins
Mark Messier, Edmonton Oilers	LW	John Tonelli, New York Islanders

== Player statistics ==
=== Scoring leaders ===
Note: GP = Games played; G = Goals; A = Assists; Pts = Points

Player	Team	GP	G	A	Pts
Wayne Gretzky	Edmonton Oilers	80	92	120	212
Mike Bossy	New York Islanders	80	64	83	147
Peter Stastny	Quebec Nordiques	80	46	93	139
Dennis Maruk	Washington Capitals	80	60	76	136
Bryan Trottier	New York Islanders	80	50	79	129
Denis Savard	Chicago Black Hawks	80	32	87	119
Marcel Dionne	Los Angeles Kings	78	50	67	117
Bobby Smith	Minnesota North Stars	80	43	71	114
Dino Ciccarelli	Minnesota North Stars	76	55	51	106
Dave Taylor	Los Angeles Kings	78	39	67	106

Source: NHL.

=== Leading goaltenders ===
Player	Team	GP	MIN	GA	SO	GAA	SV%
Denis Herron	Montreal	27	1547	68	3	2.64	.912
Rick Wamsley	Montreal	38	2206	101	2	2.75	.893
Billy Smith	New York Islanders	46	2685	133	0	2.97	.900
Roland Melanson	New York Islanders	36	2115	114	0	3.23	.896
Grant Fuhr	Edmonton	48	2847	157	0	3.31	.899
Richard Brodeur	Vancouver	52	3010	168	2	3.35	.891
Marco Baron	Boston	44	2515	144	1	3.44	.865
Gilles Meloche	Minnesota	51	3026	175	1	3.47	.894
Don Edwards	Buffalo	62	3500	205	0	3.51	.882
Eddie Mio	New York Rangers	25	1500	89	0	3.56	.885

== Coaches ==
=== Patrick Division ===
- New York Islanders: Al Arbour
- New York Rangers: Herb Brooks
- Philadelphia Flyers: Pat Quinn and Bob McCammon
- Pittsburgh Penguins: Eddie Johnston
- Washington Capitals: Danny Belisle

=== Adams Division ===
- Boston Bruins: Gerry Cheevers
- Buffalo Sabres: Jimmy Roberts
- Hartford Whalers: Larry Pleau
- Montreal Canadiens: Bob Berry
- Quebec Nordiques: Michel Bergeron

=== Norris Division ===
- Chicago Black Hawks: Keith Magnuson and Bob Pulford
- Detroit Red Wings: Wayne Maxner
- Minnesota North Stars: Glen Sonmor
- St. Louis Blues: Red Berenson and Emile Francis
- Toronto Maple Leafs: Mike Nykoluk
- Winnipeg Jets: Tom Watt

=== Smythe Division ===
- Calgary Flames: Al MacNeil
- Colorado Rockies: Bill MacMillan
- Edmonton Oilers: Glen Sather
- Los Angeles Kings: Parker MacDonald
- Vancouver Canucks: Harry Neale and Roger Neilson

== Milestones ==
=== Debuts ===
The following is a list of players of note who played their first NHL game in 1981–82 (listed with their first team, asterisk(*) marks debut in playoffs):

- Jiri Bubla, Vancouver Canucks
- Garth Butcher, Vancouver Canucks
- Bob Carpenter, Washington Capitals
- Gaetan Duchesne, Washington Capitals
- Ron Francis, Hartford Whalers
- Grant Fuhr, Edmonton Oilers
- Randy Gregg*, Edmonton Oilers
- Dale Hawerchuk, Winnipeg Jets
- Ivan Hlinka, Vancouver Canucks
- Tim Hunter, Calgary Flames
- Pelle Lindbergh, Philadelphia Flyers
- Al MacInnis, Calgary Flames
- Mike Vernon, Calgary Flames
- Bernie Nicholls, Los Angeles Kings
- Marian Stastny, Quebec Nordiques
- Thomas Steen, Winnipeg Jets
- Tony Tanti, Chicago Black Hawks
- John Vanbiesbrouck, New York Rangers

=== Last games ===
The following is a list of players of note that played their last game in the NHL in 1981–82 (listed with their last team):

- Don Marcotte, Boston Bruins
- Dick Redmond, Boston Bruins
- Rogie Vachon, Boston Bruins
- Yvon Lambert, Buffalo Sabres
- Bill Clement, Calgary Flames
- Bob Murdoch, Calgary Flames
- Eric Vail, Detroit Red Wings
- Dave Keon, Hartford Whalers
- Paul Shmyr, Hartford Whalers
- Rick Martin, Los Angeles Kings
- Steve Vickers, New York Rangers
- Bob Dailey, Philadelphia Flyers
- Jimmy Watson, Philadelphia Flyers
- Gregg Sheppard, Pittsburgh Penguins
- Ron Stackhouse, Pittsburgh Penguins
- Don Luce, Toronto Maple Leafs
- Rene Robert, Toronto Maple Leafs
- Bob Kelly, Washington Capitals
- Jean Pronovost, Washington Capitals

== Broadcasting ==
Hockey Night in Canada on CBC Television televised Saturday night regular season games and Stanley Cup playoff games.

This was the last season that U.S. national broadcasts were split between the two cable networks ESPN and USA, with each carrying slates of regular season and playoff games. In order to prevent overexposure, the NHL decided to grant only one network exclusive rights. In April 1982, USA outbid ESPN for the deal.

== See also ==
- List of Stanley Cup champions
- 1981 NHL entry draft
- 1981–82 NHL transactions
- 34th National Hockey League All-Star Game
- National Hockey League All-Star Game
- Lester Patrick Trophy
- 1981 Canada Cup
- 1981 in sports
- 1982 in sports
