= 1982 Stanley Cup playoffs =

Tournament details
- Dates: April 7–May 16, 1982
- Teams: 16
- Defending champions: New York Islanders

Final positions
- Champions: New York Islanders
- Runners-up: Vancouver Canucks

Tournament statistics
- Scoring leader(s): Bryan Trottier (Islanders) (29 points)

Awards
- MVP: Mike Bossy (Islanders)

The 1982 Stanley Cup playoffs, the playoff tournament of the National Hockey League (NHL) began on April 7, after the conclusion of the 1981–82 NHL season. The playoffs concluded on May 16 with the champion New York Islanders defeating the Vancouver Canucks 3–1 to win the final series four games to none and win the Stanley Cup. A new divisional-based playoff structure was adopted, replacing the previous format that seeded teams regardless of division or conference.

The first round of the 1982 playoffs saw three first-place teams (Edmonton, Minnesota, and Montreal) upset by fourth-place teams, a round which featured what is still the greatest comeback in NHL history: The Kings' 6–5 win over Edmonton in game three. After trailing 5–0 after two periods, the Kings scored five third period goals—three in the last 5:22, the final goal coming with only five seconds left in regulation. Los Angeles then scored on a face-off early in overtime, thus completing the "Miracle on Manchester".

== Playoff seeds ==
The NHL adopted a new playoff format in which the four teams with the best regular-season records from each of the four divisions secured playoff berths.

The following teams qualified for the playoffs:

=== Prince of Wales Conference ===
==== Adams Division ====
1. Montreal Canadiens, Adams Division champions – 109 points
2. Boston Bruins – 96 points
3. Buffalo Sabres – 93 points
4. Quebec Nordiques – 82 points

==== Patrick Division ====
1. New York Islanders, Patrick Division champions, Prince of Wales Conference regular season champions – 118 points
2. New York Rangers – 92 points
3. Philadelphia Flyers – 87 points
4. Pittsburgh Penguins – 75 points

=== Clarence Campbell Conference ===
==== Norris Division ====
1. Minnesota North Stars, Norris Division champions – 94 points
2. Winnipeg Jets – 80 points
3. St. Louis Blues – 72 points (32 wins)
4. Chicago Black Hawks – 72 points (30 wins)

==== Smythe Division ====
1. Edmonton Oilers, Smythe Division champions, Clarence Campbell Conference regular season champions – 111 points
2. Vancouver Canucks – 77 points
3. Calgary Flames – 75 points
4. Los Angeles Kings – 63 points

== Playoff bracket ==
Under the new playoff format, the division semifinals saw the first-place club against the fourth-place team, while the other two teams played each other. The two winning teams from each division's semifinals then met in the division finals. The two division winners of each conference then played in the conference finals. The two conference winners then advanced to the Stanley Cup Final. With the exception of the first round extending to a best-of-seven in 1987, this format remained in place until 1993.

Home-ice advantage during the first two rounds was awarded to the team that had the better regular season record. For the conference finals and Stanley Cup Final, it was decided that home-ice advantage would rotate between the divisions and conferences, respectively. Coin flips were conducted prior to the start of the regular season, awarding home-ice advantage in the conference finals to champions of the Patrick and Norris divisions, with the Adams and Smythe division champions receiving that advantage for the following season. Similarly, a puck flip determined that home-ice advantage for the Stanley Cup Final were granted to the Wales Conference champion this year, with the Campbell Conference champion receiving the advantage next season.

Each division semifinals series was competed in a best-of-five playoff following a 2–2–1 format (scores in the bracket indicate the number of games won in each series), with the team with home ice advantage playing at home for games one and two (and game five, if necessary), and the other team playing at home for game three (and game four, if necessary). In the other three rounds, each series was competed in a best-of-seven playoff following a 2–2–1–1–1 format, with the team with home ice advantage playing at home for games one and two (and games five and seven, if necessary), and the other team playing at home for games three and four (and game six, if necessary).

Division semifinals	Division finals
A1	Montreal	2
A4	Quebec	3
A4	Quebec	4
A2	Boston	3
A2	Boston	3
A3	Buffalo	1
Prince of Wales Conference
P1	NY Islanders	3
P4	Pittsburgh	2
P1	NY Islanders	4
P2	NY Rangers	2
P2	NY Rangers	3
P3	Philadelphia	1
N1	Minnesota	1
N4	Chicago	3
N4	Chicago	4
N3	St. Louis	2
N2	Winnipeg	1
N3	St. Louis	3
Clarence Campbell Conference
S1	Edmonton	2
S4	Los Angeles	3
S4	Los Angeles	1
S2	Vancouver	4
S2	Vancouver	3
S3	Calgary	0

Conference finals
A4	Quebec	0
P1	NY Islanders	4
N4	Chicago	1
S2	Vancouver	4

Stanley Cup Final
P1	NY Islanders	4
S2	Vancouver	0

== Division semifinals ==
=== Prince of Wales Conference ===
==== (A1) Montreal Canadiens vs. (A4) Quebec Nordiques ====
This was the first playoff series meeting between these two teams.

Dale Hunter scored the game-winning overtime goal in the decisive game five twenty-two seconds into the first OT to help the Nordiques eliminate the Canadiens.

April 7	Quebec Nordiques	1–5	Montreal Canadiens	Montreal Forum	Recap
No scoring		First period	00:56 – Mario Tremblay (1); 13:32 – pp – Mark Napier (1)
No scoring		Second period	12:48 – Mario Tremblay (2)
Anton Stastny (1) – 10:55		Third period	07:31 – sh – Doug Jarvis (1); 08:03 – sh – Mark Napier (2)
Dan Bouchard 36 saves / 41 shots		Goalie stats	Rick Wamsley 18 saves / 19 shots

April 8	Quebec Nordiques	3–2	Montreal Canadiens	Montreal Forum	Recap
Pat Hickey (1) – pp – 04:56		First period	No scoring
Alain Cote (1) – 09:43		Second period	00:26 – pp – Guy Lafleur (1); 07:20 – Chris Nilan (1)
Pierre Aubry (1) – 02:30		Third period	No scoring
Dan Bouchard 33 saves / 35 shots		Goalie stats	Rick Wamsley 14 saves / 17 shots

April 10	Montreal Canadiens	1–2	Quebec Nordiques	Quebec Coliseum	Recap
No scoring		First period	18:28 – pp – Dale Hunter (1); 19:40 – Dale Hunter (2)
No scoring		Second period	No scoring
Guy Lafleur (2) – pp – 19:34		Third period	No scoring
Rick Wamsley 20 saves / 22 shots		Goalie stats	Dan Bouchard 22 saves / 23 shots

April 11	Montreal Canadiens	6–2	Quebec Nordiques	Quebec Coliseum	Recap
Doug Risebrough (1) – 08:45; Pierre Mondou (1) – sh – 18:35		First period	12:47 – pp – Michel Goulet (1)
Mario Tremblay (3) – 09:23; Pierre Mondou (2) – pp – 18:57		Second period	No scoring
Mark Napier (3) – 03:58; Doug Risebrough (2) – 11:05		Third period	12:32 – Jacques Richard (1)
Rick Wamsley 24 saves / 26 shots		Goalie stats	Dan Bouchard 22 saves / 28 shots

April 13	Quebec Nordiques	3–2	OT	Montreal Canadiens	Montreal Forum	Recap
Wilf Paiement (1) – 04:40; Anton Stastny (2) – pp – 14:49		First period		No scoring
No scoring		Second period		No scoring
No scoring		Third period		10:49 – Mario Tremblay (4); 12:14 – Robert Picard (1)
Dale Hunter (3) – 00:22		First overtime period		No scoring
Dan Bouchard 33 saves / 35 shots		Goalie stats		Rick Wamsley 16 saves / 19 shots

Quebec won series 3–2

==== (A2) Boston Bruins vs. (A3) Buffalo Sabres ====
This was the first playoff series meeting between these two teams.

April 7	Buffalo Sabres	1–3	Boston Bruins	Boston Garden	Recap
No scoring		First period	19:44 – pp – Peter McNab (1)
No scoring		Second period	18:44 – Brad Park (1)
Yvon Lambert (1) – 08:20		Third period	09:48 – Mike O'Connell (1)
Don Edwards 35 saves / 38 shots		Goalie stats	Mike Moffat 24 saves / 25 shots

April 8	Buffalo Sabres	3–7	Boston Bruins	Boston Garden	Recap
Dale McCourt (1) – 12:44		First period	15:49 – Rick Middleton (1)
Mike Ramsey (1) – 07:08		Second period	00:48 – pp – Barry Pederson (1); 01:40 – pp – Rick Middleton (2); 03:56 – Barry Pederson (2); 11:45 – Terry O'Reilly (1); 14:28 – Barry Pederson (3)
Yvon Lambert (2) – pp – 17:33		Third period	00:54 – Bruce Crowder (1)
Don Edwards 8 saves / 14 shots Paul Harrison 7 saves / 8 shots		Goalie stats	Mike Moffat 23 saves / 26 shots

April 10	Boston Bruins	2–5	Buffalo Sabres	Buffalo Memorial Auditorium	Recap
No scoring		First period	09:02 – pp – Brent Peterson (1)
Steve Kasper (1) – 06:58; Steve Kasper (2) – pp – 17:02		Second period	07:21 – Yvon Lambert (3); 13:01 – Craig Ramsay (1); 13:34 – pp – Mike Foligno (1)
No scoring		Third period	19:15 – pp – Dale McCourt (2)
Mike Moffat 28 saves / 33 shots		Goalie stats	Don Edwards 20 saves / 22 shots

April 11	Boston Bruins	5–2	Buffalo Sabres	Buffalo Memorial Auditorium	Recap
Peter McNab (2) – 04:32		First period	11:08 – pp – Mike Foligno (2)
Terry O'Reilly (2) – 10:11; Terry O'Reilly (3) – 11:59; Mike Gillis (1) – 12:26; Peter McNab (3) – 19:06		Second period	No scoring
No scoring		Third period	18:25 – pp – Ric Seiling (1)
Mike Moffat 21 saves / 23 shots		Goalie stats	Don Edwards 26 saves / 31 shots

Boston won series 3–1

==== (P1) New York Islanders vs. (P4) Pittsburgh Penguins ====
This was the second playoff series meeting between these two teams. New York won the only previous meeting in seven games in the 1975 Stanley Cup Quarterfinals after falling behind 3–0 in the series.

John Tonelli scored the game-tying goal late in the third period and game-winning overtime goal in the decisive game five to lift the Islanders over the Penguins.

April 7	Pittsburgh Penguins	1–8	New York Islanders	Nassau Coliseum	Recap
Pat Boutette (1) – pp – 14:42		First period	05:52 – Mike Bossy (1); 06:44 – Clark Gillies (1); 18:56 – Bryan Trottier (1)
No scoring		Second period	08:52 – Clark Gillies (2); 13:32 – Bryan Trottier (2); 16:24 – Wayne Merrick (1)
No scoring		Third period	02:26 – pp – Stefan Persson (1); 18:02 – Brent Sutter (1)
Michel Dion 29 saves / 37 shots		Goalie stats	Billy Smith 22 saves / 23 shots

April 8	Pittsburgh Penguins	2–7	New York Islanders	Nassau Coliseum	Recap
No scoring		First period	07:57 – pp – Mike Bossy (2); 15:25 – Wayne Merrick (2); 17:12 – Butch Goring (1); 17:53 – Brent Sutter (2)
Rick MacLeish (1) – 05:32		Second period	07:30 – Clark Gillies (3); 12:51 – John Tonelli (1)
Pat Boutette (2) – pp – 17:04		Third period	00:40 – Greg Gilbert (1)
Michel Dion 27 saves / 34 shots		Goalie stats	Billy Smith 34 saves / 36 shots

April 10	New York Islanders	1–2	OT	Pittsburgh Penguins	Pittsburgh Civic Arena	Recap
Mike McEwen (1) – 17:36		First period		No scoring
No scoring		Second period		No scoring
No scoring		Third period		06:51 – Pat Boutette (3)
No scoring		First overtime period		04:14 – Rick Kehoe (1)
Billy Smith 31 saves / 33 shots		Goalie stats		Michel Dion 38 saves / 39 shots

April 11	New York Islanders	2–5	Pittsburgh Penguins	Pittsburgh Civic Arena	Recap
Clark Gillies (4) – pp – 04:16		First period	12:44 – Andre St. Laurent (1); 14:13 – pp – Paul Gardner (1)
Wayne Merrick (3) – 17:18		Second period	01:52 – Rick Kehoe (2); 16:20 – Andre St. Laurent (2)
No scoring		Third period	17:12 – Rod Schutt (1)
Roland Melanson 24 saves / 29 shots		Goalie stats	Michel Dion 24 saves / 26 shots

April 13	Pittsburgh Penguins	3–4	OT	New York Islanders	Nassau Coliseum	Recap
No scoring		First period		No scoring
Kevin McClelland (1) – 11:01; Mike Bullard (1) – 16:10; Randy Carlyle (1) – 18:31		Second period		10:18 – Bob Nystrom (1)
No scoring		Third period		14:33 – pp – Mike McEwen (2); 17:39 – John Tonelli (2)
No scoring		First overtime period		06:19 – John Tonelli (3)
Michel Dion 43 saves / 47 shots		Goalie stats		Billy Smith 18 saves / 21 shots Roland Melanson 0 saves / 0 shots

New York won series 3–2

==== (P2) New York Rangers vs. (P3) Philadelphia Flyers ====
This was the fourth playoff series meeting between the two teams. Philadelphia won two of the previous three meetings, including their most recent meeting in the 1980 Stanley Cup Quarterfinals in five games.

Game two saw New York's Mikko Leinonen set an NHL playoff record with six assists, a feat only matched by Wayne Gretzky.

April 7	Philadelphia Flyers	4–1	New York Rangers	Madison Square Garden	Recap
Darryl Sittler (1) – pp – 06:31; Brian Propp (1) – 15:24		First period	03:10 – Eddie Johnstone (1)
No scoring		Second period	No scoring
Darryl Sittler (2) – 02:30; Ray Allison (1) – pp – 05:17		Third period	No scoring
Pete Peeters 35 saves / 36 shots		Goalie stats	Eddie Mio 16 saves / 20 shots

April 8	Philadelphia Flyers	3–7	New York Rangers	Madison Square Garden	Recap
Bobby Clarke (1) – 00:48		First period	01:57 – Carol Vadnais (1); 13:47 – pp – Ron Duguay (1)
Ray Allison (2) – pp – 13:08		Second period	06:17 – pp – Don Maloney (1); 11:26 – pp – Robbie Ftorek (1); 18:50 – Dave Silk (1)
Ken Linseman (1) – pp – 19:27		Third period	04:31 – Rob McClanahan (1); 17:03 – pp – Eddie Johnstone (2)
Pete Peeters 17 saves / 24 shots		Goalie stats	Eddie Mio 23 saves / 26 shots

April 10	New York Rangers	4–3	Philadelphia Flyers	Spectrum	Recap
No scoring		First period	04:51 – sh – Bobby Clarke (2); 06:24 – pp – Behn Wilson (1); 10:46 – Brian Propp (2)
Mike Rogers (1) – 5:44; Reijo Ruotsalainen (1) – pp – 08:43; Don Maloney (2) – 19:06		Second period	No scoring
Cam Connor (1) – 18:51		Third period	No scoring
Eddie Mio 28 saves / 31 shots		Goalie stats	Pete Peeters 26 saves / 30 shots

April 11	New York Rangers	7–5	Philadelphia Flyers	Spectrum	Recap
Robbie Ftorek (2) – pp – 09:37		First period	No scoring
Andre Dore (1) – 02:09; Robbie Ftorek (3) – pp – 03:42; Ron Duguay (2) – 12:45; Mark Pavelich (1) – 17:17		Second period	04:05 – Paul Holmgren (1); 16:14 – Bobby Clarke (3)
Dave Maloney (1) – pp – 01:25; Ron Duguay (3) – en – 19:53		Third period	04:08 – pp – Bobby Clarke (4); 13:33 – Darryl Sittler (3); 16:19 – sh – Bill Barber (1)
Eddie Mio 38 saves / 43 shots		Goalie stats	Pete Peeters 11 saves / 16 shots Rick St. Croix 7 saves / 8 shots

New York won series 3–1

=== Clarence Campbell Conference ===
==== (N1) Minnesota North Stars vs. (N4) Chicago Black Hawks ====
This was the first playoff series meeting between these two teams.

April 7	Chicago Black Hawks	3–2	OT	Minnesota North Stars	Met Center	Recap
No scoring		First period		No scoring
Doug Wilson (1) – sh – 07:05		Second period		04:18 – Tim Young (1)
Glen Sharpley (1) – 03:14		Third period		09:13 – Al McAdam (1)
Greg Fox (1) – 03:34		First overtime period		No scoring
Murray Bannerman 45 saves / 47 shots		Goalie stats		Gilles Meloche 20 saves / 23 shots

April 8	Chicago Black Hawks	5–3	Minnesota North Stars	Met Center	Recap
No scoring		First period	No scoring
Tom Lysiak (1) – pp – 03:17; Dave Feamster (1) – 04:01		Second period	10:14 – pp – Steve Payne (1); 16:28 – Mark Johnson (1)
Al Secord (1) – pp – 07:46; Denis Savard (1) – 12:07; Tom Lysiak (2) – en – 19:42		Third period	17:03 – Bobby Smith (1)
Murray Bannerman 33 saves / 36 shots		Goalie stats	Don Beaupre 24 saves / 28 shots Gilles Meloche 0 saves / 0 shots

April 10	Minnesota North Stars	7–1	Chicago Black Hawks	Chicago Stadium	Recap
Bobby Smith (2) – 02:25; Dino Ciccarelli (1) – 10:22; Mark Johnson (2) – pp – 12:25		First period	12:51 – Glen Sharpley (2)
Steve Payne (2) – 01:39; Steve Payne (3) – pp – 05:01; Dino Ciccarelli (2) – pp – 09:20		Second period	No scoring
Dino Ciccarelli (3) – pp – 01:30		Third period	No scoring
Gilles Meloche 38 saves / 39 shots		Goalie stats	Murray Bannerman 21 saves / 28 shots

April 11	Minnesota North Stars	2–5	Chicago Black Hawks	Chicago Stadium	Recap
No scoring		First period	00:35 – Rich Preston (1); 07:28 – Grant Mulvey (1)
Craig Hartsburg (1) – 06:58; Steve Payne (4) – 12:43		Second period	16:15 – pp – Al Secord (2)
No scoring		Third period	00:40 – Tim Higgins (1); 19:49 – en – Glen Sharpley (3)
Gilles Meloche 22 saves / 26 shots Don Beaupre 0 saves / 0 shots		Goalie stats	Tony Esposito 31 saves / 33 shots

Chicago won series 3–1

==== (N2) Winnipeg Jets vs. (N3) St. Louis Blues ====
This was the first playoff series meeting between these two teams.

April 7	St. Louis Blues	4–3	Winnipeg Jets	Winnipeg Arena	Recap
Perry Turnbull (1) – 19:51		First period	01:20 – Willy Lindstrom (1); 15:20 – Dale Hawerchuk (1)
Perry Turnbull (2) – 06:07		Second period	No scoring
Brian Sutter (1) – 15:17; Guy Lapointe (1) – pp – 18:02		Third period	15:03 – Willy Lindstrom (2)
Mike Liut 33 saves / 36 shots		Goalie stats	Ed Staniowski 13 saves / 17 shots

April 8	St. Louis Blues	2–5	Winnipeg Jets	Winnipeg Arena	Recap
Brian Sutter (2) – 08:05		First period	15:35 – pp – Paul MacLean (1)
No scoring		Second period	05:23 – pp – Dave Babych (1); 10:07 – pp – Paul MacLean (2); 11:07 – Lucien DeBlois (1); 15:37 – pp – Norm Dupont (1)
Brian Sutter (3) – 15:15		Third period	No scoring
Mike Liut 28 saves / 33 shots		Goalie stats	Doug Soetaert 33 saves / 35 shots

April 10	Winnipeg Jets	3–6	St. Louis Blues	Checkerdome	Recap
Bengt Lundholm (1) – 01:39		First period	07:36 – Brian Sutter (4); 14:24 – Joe Mullen (1)
No scoring		Second period	08:10 – Blake Dunlop (1); 09:32 – Mike Crombeen (1); 19:35 – Brian Sutter (5)
Moe Mantha (1) – 06:08; Paul MacLean (3) – 11:56		Third period	01:54 – Joe Mullen (2)
Doug Soetaert 21 saves / 27 shots		Goalie stats	Mike Liut 27 saves / 30 shots

April 11	Winnipeg Jets	2–8	St. Louis Blues	Checkerdome	Recap
No scoring		First period	05:36 – pp – Perry Turnbull (3); 06:17 – Larry Patey (1); 07:18 – Brian Sutter (6); 16:01 – Brian Sutter (7)
Lucien DeBlois (2) – 12:32		Second period	07:44 – Blake Dunlop (2); 17:07 – Ed Kea (1); 18:37 – Bernie Federko (1)
Norm Dupont (2) – pp – 06:36		Third period	08:17 – Joe Mullen (3)
Ed Staniowski 17 saves / 25 shots		Goalie stats	Mike Liut 39 saves / 41 shots

St. Louis won series 3–1

==== (S1) Edmonton Oilers vs. (S4) Los Angeles Kings ====
This was the first playoff series meeting between these two teams. Game three is known as "The Miracle on Manchester" as the Kings scored five goals to come back from 5–0 down to force overtime and ultimately winning the game in OT.

April 7	Los Angeles Kings	10–8	Edmonton Oilers	Northlands Coliseum	Recap
Steve Bozek (1) – pp – 06:00; Jim Fox (1) – 14:09; Dave Taylor (1) – pp – 19:53		First period	01:35 – Glenn Anderson (1); 06:16 – Tom Roulston (1); 06:36 – Risto Siltanen (1); 09:02 – Risto Siltanen (2)
Doug Smith (1) – 03:11; Marcel Dionne (1) – pp – 09:17; Marcel Dionne (2) – pp – 14:17; Daryl Evans (1) – 15:00; Daryl Evans (2) – 19:36		Second period	13:30 – sh – Charlie Huddy (1); 17:22 – Dave Lumley (1)
Charlie Simmer (1) – 14:56; Bernie Nicholls (1) – en – 19:08		Third period	10:20 – Wayne Gretzky (1); 12:20 – Matti Hagman (1)
Mario Lessard 25 saves / 33 shots		Goalie stats	Grant Fuhr 25 saves / 34 shots

April 8	Los Angeles Kings	2–3	OT	Edmonton Oilers	Northlands Coliseum	Recap
No scoring		First period		01:55 – Pat Hughes (1)
Bernie Nicholls (2) – 05:33; Daryl Evans (3) – 13:07		Second period		No scoring
No scoring		Third period		15:06 – Jari Kurri (1)
No scoring		First overtime period		06:20 – Wayne Gretzky (2)
Mario Lessard 43 saves / 46 shots		Goalie stats		Grant Fuhr 33 saves / 35 shots

April 10	Edmonton Oilers	5–6	OT	Los Angeles Kings	The Forum	Recap
Mark Messier (1) – 10:39; Wayne Gretzky (3) – sh – 19:23		First period		No scoring
Lee Fogolin (1) – sh – 00:43; Risto Siltanen (3) – 05:15; Wayne Gretzky (4) – pp – 14:02		Second period		No scoring
No scoring		Third period		02:46 – Jay Wells (1); 05:58 – pp – Doug Smith (2); 14:38 – Charlie Simmer (2); 15:59 – Mark Hardy (1); 19:55 – pp – Steve Bozek (2)
No scoring		First overtime period		02:35 – Daryl Evans (4)
Grant Fuhr 46 saves / 52 shots		Goalie stats		Mario Lessard 31 saves / 36 shots Doug Keans 0 saves / 0 shots

April 12	Edmonton Oilers	3–2	Los Angeles Kings	The Forum	Recap
Jari Kurri (2) – 10:18		First period	05:27 – pp – Marcel Dionne (3)
Pat Hughes (2) – 11:40; Glenn Anderson (2) – 14:44		Second period	No scoring
No scoring		Third period	08:44 – Mike Murphy (1)
Grant Fuhr 23 saves / 25 shots		Goalie stats	Mario Lessard 18 saves / 21 shots

April 13	Los Angeles Kings	7–4	Edmonton Oilers	Northlands Coliseum	Recap
Charlie Simmer (3) – 03:22; Charlie Simmer (4) – 06:20; Daryl Evans (5) – pp – 15:53		First period	07:59 – pp – Wayne Gretzky (5); 19:26 – pp – Paul Coffey (1)
Marcel Dionne (4) – 01:09; Bernie Nicholls (3) – pp – 06:49; Dan Bonar (1) – 15:15		Second period	No scoring
Dan Bonar (2) – 03:06		Third period	05:51 – Garry Unger (1); 14:24 – Dave Lumley (2)
Mario Lessard 40 saves / 44 shots		Goalie stats	Grant Fuhr 24 saves / 31 shots

Los Angeles won series 3–2

==== (S2) Vancouver Canucks vs. (S3) Calgary Flames ====
This was the first playoff series meeting between these two teams.

April 7	Calgary Flames	3–5	Vancouver Canucks	Pacific Coliseum	Recap
Mel Bridgman (1) – 13:07		First period	00:08 – Stan Smyl (1); 10:29 – pp – Ivan Boldirev (1)
No scoring		Second period	No scoring
Willi Plett (1) – pp – 08:08; Mel Bridgman (2) – 12:47		Third period	03:06 – Lars Lindgren (1); 07:09 – Lars Molin (1); 13:58 – Gary Lupul (1)
Pat Riggin 30 saves / 35 shots		Goalie stats	Richard Brodeur 22 saves / 25 shots

April 8	Calgary Flames	1–2	OT	Vancouver Canucks	Pacific Coliseum	Recap
No scoring		First period		No scoring
Ken Houston (1) – 07:49		Second period		18:00 – Marc Crawford (1)
No scoring		Third period		No scoring
No scoring		First overtime period		14:20 – Tiger Williams (1)
Pat Riggin 38 saves / 40 shots		Goalie stats		Richard Brodeur 39 saves / 40 shots

April 10	Vancouver Canucks	3–1	Calgary Flames	Stampede Corral	Recap
Thomas Gradin (1) – pp – 16:14		First period	13:14 – pp – Jim Peplinski (1)
No scoring		Second period	No scoring
Tiger Williams (2) – 08:17; Thomas Gradin (2) – 17:59		Third period	No scoring
Richard Brodeur 42 saves / 43 shots		Goalie stats	Pat Riggin 20 saves / 23 shots

Vancouver won series 3–0

== Division finals ==
=== Prince of Wales Conference ===
==== (A2) Boston Bruins vs. (A4) Quebec Nordiques ====
This was the first playoff series meeting between these two teams.

Dave Pichette scored the game-winning goal on the power play with just over 10 minutes left in game seven to send the Nordiques to the conference final for the first time in franchise history.

April 15	Quebec Nordiques	3–4	Boston Bruins	Boston Garden	Recap
Michel Goulet (2) – 04:12; Real Cloutier (1) – 11:24		First period	05:18 – Barry Pederson (4); 07:29 – Dave Barr (1)
No scoring		Second period	No scoring
Real Cloutier (2) – 08:10		Third period	10:50 – Steve Kasper (3); 19:05 – Ray Bourque (1)
Dan Bouchard 34 saves / 38 shots		Goalie stats	Mike Moffat 21 saves / 24 shots

April 16	Quebec Nordiques	4–8	Boston Bruins	Boston Garden	Recap
Wilf Paiement (2) – 00:29; Mario Marois (1) – 16:24		First period	08:10 – Keith Crowder (1); 14:34 – Rick Middleton (3)
No scoring		Second period	00:37 – Barry Pederson (5); 05:36 – Tom Fergus (1); 13:37 – Barry Pederson (6)
Marian Stastny (1) – 18:39; Michel Goulet (3) – 19:36		Third period	02:34 – Bruce Crowder (2); 03:45 – Terry O'Reilly (4); 19:51 – Bruce Crowder (3)
John Garrett 32 saves / 40 shots		Goalie stats	Mike Moffat 27 saves / 31 shots

April 18	Boston Bruins	2–3	OT	Quebec Nordiques	Quebec Coliseum	Recap
Mike O'Connell (2) – 09:26		First period		19:13 – Anton Stastny (3)
Rick Middleton (4) – 04:15		Second period		14:53 – pp – Real Cloutier (3)
No scoring		Third period		No scoring
No scoring		First overtime period		11:44 – Wilf Paiement (3)
Mike Moffat 32 saves / 35 shots		Goalie stats		John Garrett 28 saves / 30 shots

April 19	Boston Bruins	2–7	Quebec Nordiques	Quebec Coliseum	Recap
No scoring		First period	08:10 – Marian Stastny (2); 08:44 – Wilf Paiement (4)
Bruce Crowder (4) – pp – 11:55		Second period	02:16 – Real Cloutier (4); 08:53 – pp – Michel Goulet (4); 10:51 – sh – Michel Goulet (5); 18:49 – Anton Stastny (4)
Tom Fergus (2) – pp – 17:01		Third period	02:30 – pp – Peter Stastny (1)
Mike Moffat 20 saves / 26 shots Rogie Vachon 2 saves / 3 shots		Goalie stats	John Garrett 33 saves / 35 shots

April 21	Quebec Nordiques	4–3	Boston Bruins	Boston Garden	Recap
Marian Stastny (3) – pp – 02:08; Peter Stastny (2) – 06:47		First period	06:18 – pp – Tom Fergus (3)
Real Cloutier (5) – 16:55		Second period	08:57 – pp – Rick Middleton (5)
Peter Stastny (3) – 03:02		Third period	05:46 – Rick Middleton (6)
John Garrett 20 saves / 23 shots		Goalie stats	Mike Moffat 13 saves / 17 shots

April 23	Boston Bruins	6–5	OT	Quebec Nordiques	Quebec Coliseum	Recap
Keith Crowder (2) – 04:18; Terry O'Reilly (5) – 05:16; Peter McNab (4) – pp – 08:44		First period		09:54 – pp – Peter Stastny (4)
Barry Pederson (7) – 07:50; Bruce Crowder (5) – 09:42		Second period		01:47 – Real Cloutier (6); 16:01 – Wilf Paiement (5); 17:41 – Real Cloutier (7)
No scoring		Third period		04:06 – Michel Goulet (6)
Peter McNab (5) – 10:54		First overtime period		No scoring
Mike Moffat 23 saves / 28 shots		Goalie stats		John Garrett 24 saves / 30 shots

April 25	Quebec Nordiques	2–1	Boston Bruins	Boston Garden	Recap
No scoring		First period	No scoring
Michel Goulet (7) – pp – 09:56		Second period	13:35 – Peter McNab (6)
Dave Pichette (1) – pp – 09:39		Third period	No scoring
Dan Bouchard 28 saves / 29 shots		Goalie stats	Mike Moffat 20 saves / 22 shots

Quebec won series 4–3

==== (P1) New York Islanders vs. (P2) New York Rangers ====
This was fourth playoff series meeting between these two teams. The Islanders won two of the previous three meetings. This was a rematch of last year's Stanley Cup Semifinals, in which the Islanders won in a four-game sweep.

April 15	New York Rangers	5–4	New York Islanders	Nassau Coliseum	Recap
Ron Duguay (4) – 03:19; Cam Connor (2) – 07:13; Rob McClanahan (2) – 17:28		First period	04:04 – Dave Langevin (1); 11:43 – Mike Bossy (3); 16:51 – Bob Nystrom (2)
Robbie Ftorek (4) – 14:56		Second period	No scoring
Reijo Ruotsalainen (2) – 18:02		Third period	15:44 – John Tonelli (4)
Eddie Mio 7 saves / 10 shots Steve Weeks 28 saves / 29 shots		Goalie stats	Billy Smith 24 saves / 29 shots

April 16	New York Rangers	2–7	New York Islanders	Nassau Coliseum	Recap
No scoring		First period	05:34 – pp – Denis Potvin (1); 11:03 – sh – Billy Carroll (1); 16:29 – Duane Sutter (1)
Robbie Ftorek (5) – pp – 17:32		Second period	10:21 – Duane Sutter (2); 13:05 – Mike Bossy (4)
Mikko Leinonen (1) – 17:41		Third period	04:48 – Bryan Trottier (3); 12:09 – pp – Mike McEwen (3)
Steve Weeks 19 saves / 26 shots		Goalie stats	Billy Smith 18 saves / 20 shots

April 18	New York Islanders	4–3	OT	New York Rangers	Madison Square Garden	Recap
Mike Bossy (5) – 12:12		First period		14:06 – Robbie Ftorek (6)
Bob Bourne (1) – pp – 07:44		Second period		No scoring
Bob Bourne (2) – 08:26		Third period		00:19 – Reijo Ruotsalainen (3); 03:19 – Mike Allison (1)
Bryan Trottier (4) – 03:00		First overtime period		No scoring
Billy Smith 22 saves / 25 shots		Goalie stats		Eddie Mio 29 saves / 33 shots

April 19	New York Islanders	5–3	New York Rangers	Madison Square Garden	Recap
Mike Bossy (6) – 10:21		First period	13:38 – Ron Duguay (5)
Denis Potvin (2) – 05:37; Clark Gillies (5) – pp – 13:08		Second period	04:31 – pp – Don Maloney (3)
Duane Sutter (3) – 12:27; Butch Goring (2) – en – 19:25		Third period	06:19 – Cam Connor (3)
Billy Smith 22 saves / 25 shots		Goalie stats	John Davidson 12 saves / 15 shots Steve Weeks 7 saves / 8 shots

April 21	New York Rangers	4–2	New York Islanders	Nassau Coliseum	Recap
Don Maloney (4) – 08:47		First period	18:09 – pp – John Tonelli (5)
Don Maloney (5) – 00:39; Dave Silk (2) – 03:24		Second period	13:14 – sh – Bob Bourne (3)
Cam Connor (4) – pp – 01:31		Third period	No scoring
Eddie Mio 29 saves / 31 shots		Goalie stats	Billy Smith 23 saves / 27 shots Roland Melanson 0 saves / 0 shots

April 23	New York Islanders	5–3	New York Rangers	Madison Square Garden	Recap
Butch Goring (3) – 11:01		First period	13:13 – pp – Reijo Ruotsalainen (4)
Butch Goring (4) – 00:33; Bob Bourne (4) – 18:17		Second period	11:34 – pp – Barry Beck (1)
Dave Langevin (2) – 13:52; Bob Bourne (5) – en – 19:28		Third period	05:46 – Robbie Ftorek (7)
Billy Smith 22 saves / 25 shots		Goalie stats	Eddie Mio 25 saves / 29 shots Steve Weeks 0 saves / 0 shots

New York Islanders won series 4–2

=== Clarence Campbell Conference ===
==== (N3) St. Louis Blues vs. (N4) Chicago Black Hawks ====
This was the third playoff series meeting between these two teams. Chicago won both previous meetings, including their most recent meeting in a three-game sweep in the 1980 Preliminary Round.

April 15	Chicago Black Hawks	5–4	St. Louis Blues	Checkerdome	Recap
Tim Higgins (2) – 01:47; Dave Hutchison (1) – 08:08		First period	No scoring
No scoring		Second period	01:49 – Ralph Klassen (1); 07:14 – Wayne Babych (1); 11:54 – Mike Crombeen (2)
Denis Savard (2) – 00:19; Tom Lysiak (3) – 02:39; Doug Wilson (2) – 14:44		Third period	12:57 – Joe Mullen (4)
Murray Bannerman 31 saves / 34 shots Tony Esposito 5 saves / 6 shots		Goalie stats	Mike Liut 23 saves / 28 shots

April 16	Chicago Black Hawks	1–3	St. Louis Blues	Checkerdome	Recap
Tom Lysiak (4) – pp – 04:46		First period	09:10 – pp – Bernie Federko (2)
No scoring		Second period	01:58 – Wayne Babych (2)
No scoring		Third period	15:57 – Joe Mullen (5)
Tony Esposito 29 saves / 32 shots		Goalie stats	Mike Liut 26 saves / 27 shots

April 18	St. Louis Blues	5–6	Chicago Black Hawks	Chicago Stadium	Recap
Wayne Babych (3) – 11:59		First period	01:21 – Bob Murray (1); 02:44 – pp – Tom Lysiak (5); 03:01 – Tim Higgins ()
Joe Mullen (6) – 14:03		Second period	01:09 – sh – Rick Paterson (1); 12:39 – pp – Denis Savard (3)
Joe Mullen (7) – pp – 17:41; Brian Sutter (8) – 17:56; Mike Zuke (1) – 19:57		Third period	12:26 – Bill Gardner (1)
Mike Liut 0 saves / 3 shots Glen Hanlon 27 saves / 30 shots		Goalie stats	Murray Bannerman 30 saves / 35 shots

April 19	St. Louis Blues	4–7	Chicago Black Hawks	Chicago Stadium	Recap
Mike Crombeen (3) – 05:53		First period	09:05 – pp – Denis Savard (4); 12:54 – pp – Denis Savard (5)
Larry Patey (2) – sh – 00:27; Ralph Klassen (2) – 04:25; Perry Anderson (1) – 07:51		Second period	12:04 – Rick Paterson (2); 17:18 – Troy Murray (1)
No scoring		Third period	04:23 – Ted Bulley (1); 11:24 – Denis Savard (6); 17:59 – Ted Bulley (2)
Glen Hanlon 22 saves / 28 shots Mike Liut 1 save / 2 shots		Goalie stats	Murray Bannerman 28 saves / 32 shots

April 21	Chicago Black Hawks	2–3	OT	St. Louis Blues	Checkerdome	Recap
Denis Savard (7) – 09:11		First period		05:51 – pp – Perry Anderson (2)
Grant Mulvey (2) – 04:08		Second period		02:29 – pp – Jorgen Pettersson (1)
No scoring		Third period		No scoring
No scoring		First overtime period		03:28 – Bernie Federko (3)
Murray Bannerman 20 saves / 23 shots		Goalie stats		Mike Liut 22 saves / 24 shots

April 23	St. Louis Blues	0–2	Chicago Black Hawks	Chicago Stadium	Recap
No scoring		First period	No scoring
No scoring		Second period	12:18 – Denis Savard (8); 16:55 – Rich Preston (2)
No scoring		Third period	No scoring
Mike Liut 25 saves / 27 shots Glen Hanlon 0 saves / 0 shots		Goalie stats	Tony Esposito 31 saves / 31 shots

Chicago won series 4–2

==== (S2) Vancouver Canucks vs. (S4) Los Angeles Kings ====
This was the first playoff series meeting between these two teams.

April 15	Los Angeles Kings	2–3	Vancouver Canucks	Pacific Coliseum	Recap
Steve Bozek (3) – 16:51		First period	No scoring
Larry Murphy (1) – 12:30		Second period	12:05 – pp – Ivan Hlinka (1); 15:38 – pp – Ivan Hlinka (2)
No scoring		Third period	05:00 – Gary Lupul (2)
Mario Lessard 36 saves / 39 shots		Goalie stats	Richard Brodeur 27 saves / 29 shots

April 16	Los Angeles Kings	3–2	OT	Vancouver Canucks	Pacific Coliseum	Recap
No scoring		First period		06:10 – Darcy Rota (1)
Dave Taylor (2) – 00:50; Marcel Dionne (5) – 10:02		Second period		11:24 – Stan Smyl (2)
No scoring		Third period		No scoring
Steve Bozek (4) – 04:33		First overtime period		No scoring
Mario Lessard 21 saves / 23 shots		Goalie stats		Richard Brodeur 32 saves / 35 shots

April 18	Vancouver Canucks	4–3	OT	Los Angeles Kings	The Forum	Recap
Colin Campbell (1) – 18:09		First period		No scoring
Thomas Gradin (3) – 19:15		Second period		03:14 – pp – John-Paul Kelly (1); 13:08 – pp – Dave Taylor (3)
Stan Smyl (3) – 14:12		Third period		10:03 – Marcel Dionne (6)
Colin Campbell (2) – 01:23		First overtime period		No scoring
Richard Brodeur 41 saves / 44 shots		Goalie stats		Mario Lessard 23 saves / 27 shots

April 19	Vancouver Canucks	5–4	Los Angeles Kings	The Forum	Recap
Ivan Boldirev (2) – 08:08		First period	15:23 – pp – Marcel Dionne (7)
Curt Fraser (1) – 00:31; Tiger Williams (3) – 06:19; Darcy Rota (2) – pp – 08:02		Second period	09:05 – Mike Murphy (2); 11:08 – pp – Dave Taylor (4)
Ivan Boldirev (3) – 01:41		Third period	13:40 – Doug Smith (3)
Richard Brodeur 33 saves / 37 shots		Goalie stats	Mario Lessard 6 saves / 10 shots Doug Keans 4 saves / 5 shots

April 21	Los Angeles Kings	2–5	Vancouver Canucks	Pacific Coliseum	Recap
Bernie Nicholls (4) – 01:30		First period	08:15 – James Nill (1); 18:04 – Doug Halward (1)
Larry Murphy (2) – pp – 19:23		Second period	03:50 – Darcy Rota (3); 19:49 – Darcy Rota (4)
No scoring		Third period	01:25 – Curt Fraser (2)
Mario Lessard 27 saves / 32 shots		Goalie stats	Richard Brodeur 28 saves / 30 shots

Vancouver won series 4–1

== Conference finals ==
=== Prince of Wales Conference final ===
==== (P1) New York Islanders vs. (A4) Quebec Nordiques ====
This was the first playoff series meeting between these two teams.

April 27	Quebec Nordiques	1–4	New York Islanders	Nassau Coliseum	Recap
No scoring		First period	05:29 – pp – Bryan Trottier (5)
No scoring		Second period	12:15 – pp – Butch Goring (5)
Peter Stastny (5) – pp – 07:02		Third period	13:46 – Denis Potvin (3); 15:14 – Wayne Merrick (4)
Dan Bouchard 28 saves / 32 shots		Goalie stats	Billy Smith 27 saves / 28 shots

April 29	Quebec Nordiques	2–5	New York Islanders	Nassau Coliseum	Recap
Marc Tardif (1) – 11:04		First period	07:46 – Wayne Merrick (5)
Peter Stastny (6) – 14:17		Second period	01:33 – Mike Bossy (7); 17:56 – pp – Mike Bossy (8)
No scoring		Third period	03:46 – Bob Bourne (6); 08:59 – Bob Nystrom (3)
Dan Bouchard 26 saves / 31 shots		Goalie stats	Billy Smith 35 saves / 37 shots

May 1	New York Islanders	5–4	OT	Quebec Nordiques	Quebec Coliseum	Recap
Mike Bossy (9) – pp – 07:10; Bob Bourne (7) – pp – 11:43		First period		01:10 – Basil McRae (1); 08:02 – pp – Peter Stastny (7)
Anders Kallur (1) – sh – 19:12		Second period		No scoring
Mike Bossy (10) – 10:48		Third period		06:53 – pp – Anton Stastny (5); 14:39 – pp – Wilf Paiement (6)
Wayne Merrick (6) – 16:52		First overtime period		No scoring
Billy Smith 31 saves / 35 shots		Goalie stats		Dan Bouchard 33 saves / 38 shots

May 4	New York Islanders	4–2	Quebec Nordiques	Quebec Coliseum	Recap
Bob Bourne (8) – 02:01		First period	No scoring
John Tonelli (6) – 01:09		Second period	No scoring
Clark Gillies (6) – pp – 15:35; Duane Sutter (4) – en – 19:58		Third period	16:09 – Dave Pichette (2); 16:46 – Michel Goulet (8)
Billy Smith 20 saves / 22 shots		Goalie stats	Dan Bouchard 26 saves / 29 shots

New York won series 4–0

=== Clarence Campbell Conference final ===
==== (N4) Chicago Black Hawks vs. (S2) Vancouver Canucks ====
This was the first playoff series meeting between these two teams.

Canucks coach Roger Neilson was tossed out of game two for holding up a white towel on a hockey stick as a form of protest. He was ejected from the game along with two players but the protest began the Canucks Towel Power tradition that still exists to this day and has since been copied by other teams.

April 27	Vancouver Canucks	2–1	2OT	Chicago Black Hawks	Chicago Stadium	Recap
Thomas Gradin (4) – 08:02		First period		10:11 – Terry Ruskowski (1)
No scoring		Second period		No scoring
No scoring		Third period		No scoring
James Nill (2) – 08:58		Second overtime period		No scoring
Richard Brodeur 46 saves / 47 shots		Goalie stats		Tony Esposito 39 saves / 41 shots

April 29	Vancouver Canucks	1–4	Chicago Black Hawks	Chicago Stadium	Recap
No scoring		First period	18:28 – Glen Sharpley (4)
No scoring		Second period	11:35 – Dave Feamster (2)
Stan Smyl (4) – 01:01		Third period	04:42 – Denis Savard (9); 16:23 – pp – Denis Savard (10)
Richard Brodeur 34 saves / 38 shots		Goalie stats	Murray Bannerman 30 saves / 31 shots

May 1	Chicago Black Hawks	3–4	Vancouver Canucks	Pacific Coliseum	Recap
Glen Sharpley (5) – 10:18; Doug Wilson (3) – 15:57		First period	11:31 – pp – Thomas Gradin (5); 14:54 – pp – Neil Belland (1)
No scoring		Second period	10:03 – Curt Fraser (3)
Rick Paterson (3) – 03:14		Third period	02:05 – Stan Smyl (5)
Murray Bannerman 26 saves / 30 shots		Goalie stats	Richard Brodeur 24 saves / 27 shots

May 4	Chicago Black Hawks	3–5	Vancouver Canucks	Pacific Coliseum	Recap
No scoring		First period	01:06 – pp – Darcy Rota (5)
Glen Sharpley (6) – 16:19		Second period	04:16 – pp – Ivan Boldirev (4); 14:08 – Ivan Boldirev (5)
Denis Savard (11) – pp – 02:33; Grant Mulvey (3) – 16:10		Third period	04:48 – Doug Halward (2); 05:51 – Thomas Gradin (6)
Tony Esposito 26 saves / 31 shots		Goalie stats	Richard Brodeur 27 saves / 30 shots

May 6	Vancouver Canucks	6–2	Chicago Black Hawks	Chicago Stadium	Recap
James Nill (3) – pp – 02:40; Stan Smyl (6) – 03:48; Lars Molin (2) – 15:35		First period	05:09 – Tom Lysiak (6)
No scoring		Second period	No scoring
Darcy Rota (6) – 05:14; Stan Smyl (7) – 11:20; Ivan Boldirev (6) – 16:17		Third period	02:38 – pp – Grant Mulvey (4)
Richard Brodeur 36 saves / 38 shots		Goalie stats	Murray Bannerman 8 saves / 11 shots Tony Esposito 14 saves / 17 shots

Vancouver won series 4–1

== Stanley Cup Final ==
This was the second playoff meeting between these two teams. New York won the only previous meeting in a two-game sweep in the 1976 Preliminary Round.

In the Stanley Cup Final, the Cinderella run of the Vancouver Canucks came to an end with a four-game sweep by the Islanders, winning their third consecutive Stanley Cup.

May 8	Vancouver Canucks	5–6	OT	New York Islanders	Nassau Coliseum	Recap
Thomas Gradin (7) – 01:29; Thomas Gradin (8) – pp – 17:40		First period		11:35 – pp – Clark Gillies (7); 15:52 – Mike Bossy (11); 19:51 – pp – Denis Potvin (4)
Stan Smyl (8) – pp – 05:06; Ivan Boldirev (7) – 09:27		Second period		03:15 – pp – Denis Potvin (5)
James Nill (4) – 13:06		Third period		15:14 – Mike Bossy (12)
No scoring		First overtime period		19:58 – Mike Bossy (13)
Richard Brodeur 30 saves / 36 shots		Goalie stats		Billy Smith 30 saves / 35 shots

May 11	Vancouver Canucks	4–6	New York Islanders	Nassau Coliseum	Recap
No scoring		First period	15:55 – sh – Billy Carroll (2)
Thomas Gradin (9) – pp – 08:28; Ivan Boldirev (8) – pp – 13:12; Lars Lindgren (2) – 19:42		Second period	17:06 – pp – Mike Bossy (14)
Gerry Minor (1) – 02:27		Third period	00:32 – pp – Bob Bourne (9); 01:19 – Duane Sutter (5); 07:18 – pp – Bryan Trottier (6); 14:10 – Bob Nystrom (4)
Richard Brodeur 30 saves / 36 shots		Goalie stats	Billy Smith 26 saves / 30 shots

May 13	New York Islanders	3–0	Vancouver Canucks	Pacific Coliseum	Recap
No scoring		First period	No scoring
Clark Gillies (8) – 02:56; Mike Bossy (15) – 12:30		Second period	No scoring
Bob Nystrom (5) – en – 18:40		Third period	No scoring
Billy Smith 23 saves / 23 shots		Goalie stats	Richard Brodeur 29 saves / 31 shots

May 16	New York Islanders	3–1	Vancouver Canucks	Pacific Coliseum	Recap
Butch Goring (6) – 11:38		First period	18:09 – Stan Smyl (9)
Mike Bossy (16) – pp – 05:00; Mike Bossy (17) – pp – 08:00		Second period	No scoring
No scoring		Third period	No scoring
Billy Smith 23 saves / 24 shots		Goalie stats	Richard Brodeur 25 saves / 28 shots

New York won series 4–0

== Player statistics ==
=== Skaters ===
These are the top ten skaters based on points.

Player	Team	GP	G	A	Pts	+/–	PIM
Bryan Trottier	New York Islanders	19	6	23	29	+9	40
Mike Bossy	New York Islanders	19	17	10	27	+7	0
Denis Potvin	New York Islanders	19	5	16	21	+9	30
Thomas Gradin	Vancouver Canucks	17	9	10	19	+8	10
Denis Savard	Chicago Black Hawks	15	11	7	18	-2	52
Stan Smyl	Vancouver Canucks	17	9	9	18	+4	25
Peter Stastny	Quebec Nordiques	12	7	11	18	+1	10
Barry Pederson	Boston Bruins	11	7	11	18	+5	22
Joe Mullen	St. Louis Blues	10	7	11	18	+7	4
Bernie Federko	St. Louis Blues	10	3	15	18	+8	10

=== Goaltenders ===
This is a combined table of the top five goaltenders based on goals against average and the top five goaltenders based on save percentage, with at least 420 minutes played. The table is sorted by GAA, and the criteria for inclusion are bolded.

Player	Team	GP	W	L	SA	GA	GAA	SV%	SO	TOI
Billy Smith	New York Islanders	18	15	3	498	47	**2.51**	**.906**	1	1125:15
Richard Brodeur	Vancouver Canucks	17	11	6	594	49	**2.71**	**.917**	0	1086:28
Mike Liut	St. Louis Blues	10	5	3	251	27	**3.29**	**.892**	0	492:58
Dan Bouchard	Quebec Nordiques	11	4	7	359	38	**3.37**	**.894**	0	676:16
Mike Moffat	Boston Bruins	11	6	5	290	38	**3.45**	.869	0	661:46

== See also ==
- 1981–82 NHL season
- List of NHL seasons
- List of Stanley Cup champions

Preceded by 1981 Stanley Cup playoffs	Stanley Cup playoffs	Succeeded by 1983 Stanley Cup playoffs
