= Kings–Oilers rivalry =

National Hockey League rivalry

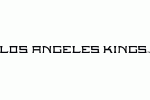
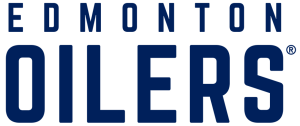
- Los Angeles Kings Edmonton Oilers
- First meeting: December 22, 1979
- Latest meeting: October 13, 2026
- Next meeting: January 21, 2027

Statistics
- Total meetings: 296
- All-time series: 150–111–30–5 (EDM)
- Regular season series: 110–91–30–5 (EDM)
- Postseason results: 40–20 (EDM)
- Largest victory: EDM 13–3 LAK; April 9, 1987
- Longest win streak: EDM W6; LAK W6
- Current win streak: EDM W1

Postseason history
- 1982 division semifinals: Kings won, 3–2; 1985 division semifinals: Oilers won, 3–0; 1987 division semifinals: Oilers won, 4–1; 1989 division semifinals: Kings won, 4–3; 1990 division finals: Oilers won, 4–0; 1991 division finals: Oilers won, 4–2; 1992 division semifinals: Oilers won, 4–2; 2022 first round: Oilers won, 4–3; 2023 first round: Oilers won, 4–2; 2024 first round: Oilers won, 4–1; 2025 first round: Oilers won, 4–2

The Kings–Oilers rivalry is a National Hockey League (NHL) rivalry between the Los Angeles Kings and Edmonton Oilers. The rivalry was widely known to be one of the most fierce matchups through the 1980s and 1990s with frequent playoff matchups occurring, in addition to the trade of Wayne Gretzky and Marty McSorley. The rivalry returned to intensity during the 2020s when the two teams matched up in the first round of the playoffs from 2022 to 2025, with each matchup being won by the Oilers. The Kings and Oilers have combined for seven Stanley Cups between them and have met in the playoffs 11 times.

== History ==
=== 1979–1988: Beginnings of the rivalry ===
During the Oilers' first years in the NHL, their roster included young star Wayne Gretzky, who instantly became a candidate for the Art Ross Trophy against the Kings' Marcel Dionne. At the end of the 1979–80 season, Gretzky and Dionne were both tied with 137 points, but Dionne, who had two more goals than Gretzky (53 against Gretzky's 51), won the award. Dionne had also played one more game that season than Gretzky, leading the latter to remark during a press conference after which the scoring title was awarded to Dionne that he had been taught "that an assist was as good as a goal."

The two teams met in the playoffs for the first time during the 1981–82 season. That year, Gretzky rewrote the NHL record books, scoring 50 goals in 39 games and tallying new single-season records for both goals (92) and points (212). The Oilers also won the Smythe Division title while only in their third NHL season. The Kings, meanwhile, after an impressive 1980–81 campaign, collapsed to the fifth-worst record among NHL teams. They nevertheless qualified for the playoffs as the fourth-place team in the division, as the Colorado Rockies had posted an even worse record. This set the stage for the top-seeded and heavily-favored Oilers to meet the Kings in the first round of the playoffs. After a two-game split in Edmonton, game three in Los Angeles saw the Oilers take a commanding 5-0 lead after two periods. However, in a miraculous comeback, the Kings managed to tie the game at 5–5 in the third period, with Steve Bozek netting the tying goal with five seconds left on a two-man advantage. The Kings won the game 6–5 in overtime on a Daryl Evans goal. This game is often referred to as the Miracle on Manchester. The Kings won the series in five games but lost in the next round in five games to the Vancouver Canucks on their way to the Stanley Cup Final.

Los Angeles missed the playoffs for the next two seasons while the Oilers competed in the Stanley Cup Final in 1983 and won their first Stanley Cup in 1984. Both Final series were played against the dynastic New York Islanders. The two teams finally met again in the 1985 playoffs, but this time the Oilers swept the Kings in three games en route to winning their second straight Stanley Cup. The Kings and Oilers met again during the 1987 playoffs under a new best-of-seven playoff format in the first round, but the Oilers were victorious again, this time in five games including a 13–3 rout in game two, going on to win a third Stanley Cup in four years.

=== 1988–1992: Gretzky switches sides ===
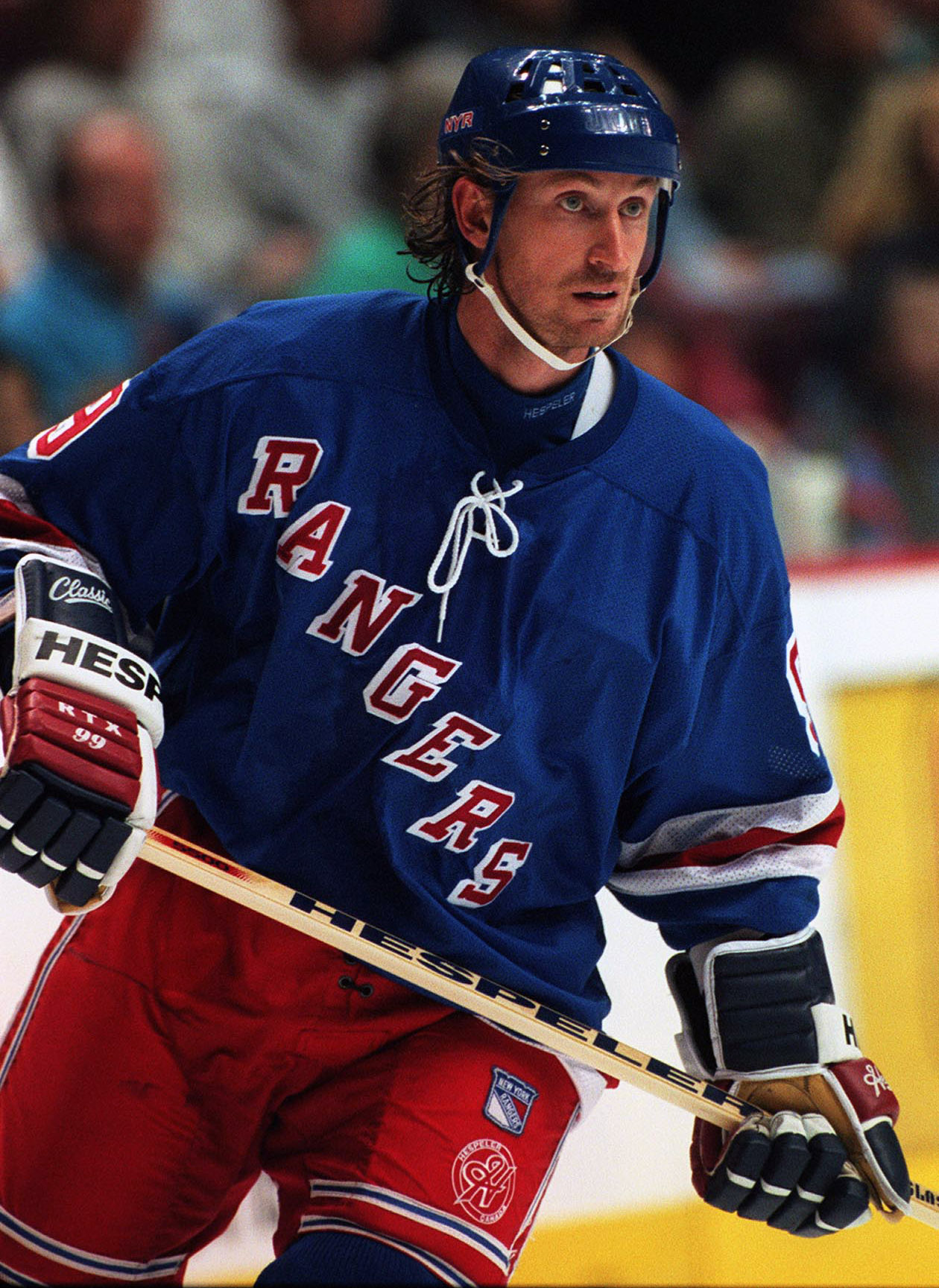
Wayne Gretzky and Marty McSorley were both pivotal stars traded to Los Angeles in 1988

On August 9, 1988, about nearly three months after the Oilers won their fourth Stanley Cup in five years, in one of the most shocking trades in sports history, the Oilers announced they were sending Gretzky, along with Mike Krushelnyski and Marty McSorley, to the Kings for two younger players (Jimmy Carson and Martin Gélinas), three first-round draft picks, and US$15 million in cash. The trade introduced a high level of animosity between the two teams; Oilers fans expressed immense anger towards the trade, protesting in the streets and burning team owner Peter Pocklington in effigy. In Gretzky's first game in Edmonton after the trade, he received a four-minute standing ovation from the Oilers fans. The arena was a sold-out crowd and was the Oilers' biggest crowd ever to that date (17,503). After the game, Gretzky took a moment to thank the Edmonton fans: "I'm still proud to be a Canadian. I didn't desert my country. I moved because I was traded and that's where my job is. But I'm Canadian to the core. I hope Canadians understand that." After the 1988–89 season, the Oilers constructed a life-sized bronze statue of Gretzky outside Northlands Coliseum, holding the Stanley Cup over his head.

Gretzky immediately elevated the Kings in the 1988–89 season to vast improvements. For the first time, the Kings finished ahead of Edmonton, finishing second in the Smythe Division over the third-place Oilers. This also led to another first-round playoff matchup between both teams. However, this time Gretzky faced off against the Oilers, with the Kings having the home-ice advantage. The Oilers began the series with a 3–1 series lead over the Kings, but Los Angeles went on to win three straight games to win the series. The next three seasons would also see the Kings and Oilers meet in the playoffs; the Oilers won all three series and the Stanley Cup in 1990.

=== 1993–2020: Shifting competition ===
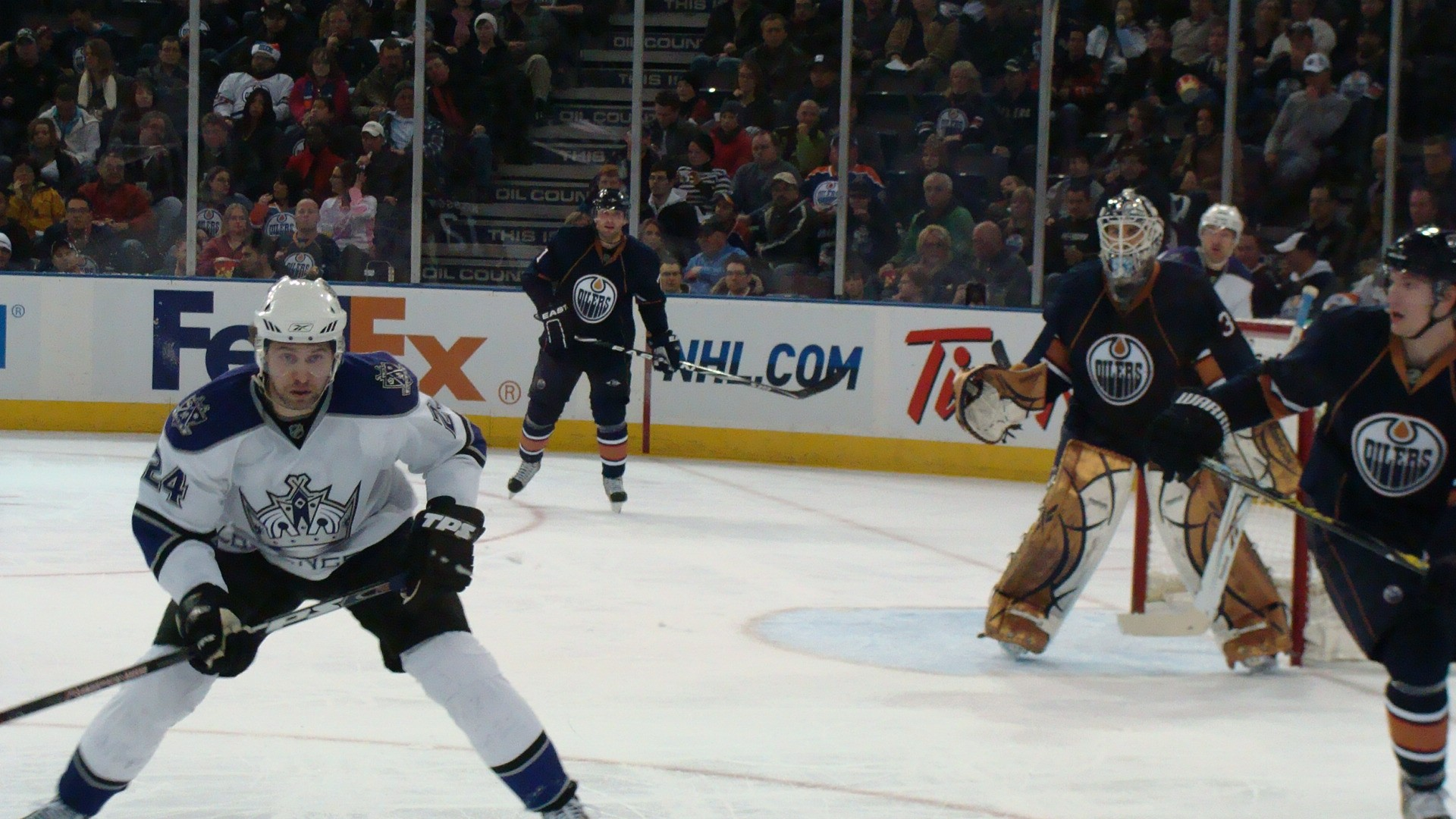
The Kings and Oilers face off in Edmonton in 2009

The rivalry began to die down during the 1992–93 season as players from the Oilers moved to other teams, and Edmonton missed the playoffs for the first time since joining the NHL in 1979. Meanwhile, Gretzky's former Edmonton teammates Jari Kurri, Paul Coffey, and Charlie Huddy joined him on the Kings and contributed to a playoff push in which the Kings went all the way to the 1993 Stanley Cup Final before losing in five games to the Montreal Canadiens.

The Oilers and Kings did not meet in the playoffs until 2022 as both teams fluctuated in competition at varying points. The Kings traded Gretzky to the St. Louis Blues on February 27, 1996; he later finished his career with the New York Rangers. In addition, realignment before the 1998–99 season moved the Oilers to the newly-created Northwest Division, limiting the number of times Edmonton and Los Angeles met in the regular season. The two teams then reunited in the Pacific Division before the 2013–14 season. The Oilers made another Stanley Cup appearance in 2006, while the Kings won two Stanley Cups in 2012 and 2014 respectively.

=== 2021–present: Return to the battle ===
In the 2022 playoffs, the rivalry was reignited when both teams met in the first round. The Oilers came back from a 1–0 and a 3–2 series deficit to defeat the Kings in seven games. They met again in the 2023 playoffs, where the series ended in six games, ending with a 5–4 win in Los Angeles. They met again for a third consecutive year in the 2024 playoffs; this series featured a heated game three in which the teams combined for 92 penalty minutes, 82 in the third period, amidst a 6–1 victory for the Oilers. The Oilers won the series in five games en route to the Stanley Cup Final. In the ensuing off-season, both teams would swap players in free agency as the Oilers signed Viktor Arvidsson from the Kings to a two-year, $8 million contract while the Kings signed Warren Foegele from the Oilers to a three-year, $10.5 million contract.

During the 2024–25 season, the rivalry became even more intense. With both teams set to meet in the first round for the fourth consecutive year in the 2025 playoffs, they met in two regular season games in a span of 10 days from April 5 to 14, 2025, that decided home-ice advantage in that matchup. The Kings won both games by a score of 3–0 in Los Angeles and 5–0 in Edmonton, respectively, to clinch home-ice advantage. However in the last two meetings of the regular season the Oilers did not have both Connor McDavid and Leon Draisaitl available because of injuries. Despite the Kings taking a 2–0 series lead, the Oilers won the next four games to once again win the first-round series, en route to a second consecutive Stanley Cup Final. The Kings held a 4–3 lead in the third period of game three and potentially a 3–0 series lead for the Kings before head coach Jim Hiller unsuccessfully challenged Evander Kane's game-tying goal for goaltender interference, resulting in Evan Bouchard scoring the eventual game-winning goal on the ensuing power play for the Oilers; the coach's challenge call was widely viewed as the turning point of the series. Following the series, the Kings named former Oilers general manager Ken Holland as their new vice president and general manager, replacing Rob Blake whose contract was not renewed. They subsequently signed Corey Perry from the Oilers as a free agent to a one-year, $2 million contract.
