= Mario Lessard =

Canadian ice hockey player

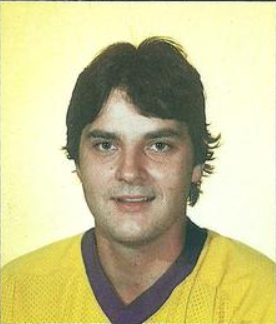
- Lessard with the Los Angeles Kings in 1980
- Born: June 25, 1954 (age 71) East Broughton, Quebec, Canada
- Height: 5 ft 9 in (175 cm)
- Weight: 177 lb (80 kg; 12 st 9 lb)
- Position: Goaltender
- Caught: Left
- Played for: Los Angeles Kings
- NHL draft: 154th overall, 1974; Los Angeles Kings
- WHA draft: 128th overall, 1974; Quebec Nordiques
- Playing career: 1977–1984

Mario Lessard (born June 25, 1954) is a Canadian former professional ice hockey goaltender.

Born in East Broughton, Quebec, Lessard began his National Hockey League career with the Los Angeles Kings in 1978, the team he would play his entire NHL career with. Lessard recorded four shutouts in 1978–79, tied for second best in the league. Lessard also was an NHL second team All-Star in 1981 and appeared in the 1981 NHL All-Star Game.

Lessard may be best known as the Kings goalie in the Miracle on Manchester playoff game in April 1982 in which the Kings rallied from a 5–0 deficit to beat the Edmonton Oilers, 6–5 in overtime. Early in overtime of that game, Lessard mishandled the puck 40 feet in front of his net as he attempted to beat Glenn Anderson to the puck and stop a breakaway; with the net wide open and defenceman Mark Hardy trying to act as goalie, the Oilers Mark Messier shot the puck over the open net. The Kings scored two minutes later to win. After the game Lessard lamented that his mistake nearly blew the amazing comeback. He retired after the 1984 season.

== Career statistics ==
=== Regular season and playoffs ===
			Regular season									Playoffs
Season	Team	League	GP	W	L	T	MIN	GA	SO	GAA	SV%	GP	W	L	MIN	GA	SO	GAA	SV%
1969–70	Sherbrooke Castors	QMJHL	15	3	5	0	560	63	0	6.76	.831	—	—	—	—	—	—	—	—
1970–71	Sherbrooke Castors	QMJHL	—	—	—	—	—	—	—	—	—	—	—	—	—	—	—	—	—
1971–72	Sherbrooke Castors	QMJHL	17	—	—	—	1020	72	2	4.24	.895	3	0	3	133	24	0	10.83	.784
1972–73	Sherbrooke Castors	QMJHL	37	—	—	—	2180	161	0	4.43	.880	6	—	—	360	24	0	4.00	.881
1973–74	Sherbrooke Castors	QMJHL	36	—	—	—	2140	180	0	5.05	.860	4	—	—	240	24	0	6.00	.892
1974–75	Saginaw Gears	IHL	59	—	—	—	3186	171	4	3.22	—	17	10	7	1016	64	2	3.78	—
1975–76	Saginaw Gears	IHL	62	—	—	—	3323	187	3	3.38	—	12	7	5	722	31	1	2.58	—
1976–77	Fort Worth Texans	CHL	4	1	3	0	192	11	0	3.44	.896	—	—	—	—	—	—	—	—
1976–77	Saginaw Gears	IHL	44	—	—	—	2489	144	0	3.47	—	18	12	6	1059	52	1	2.95	—
1977–78	Springfield Indians	AHL	57	30	19	6	3295	204	1	3.71	—	4	1	3	239	10	1	2.51	—
1978–79	Los Angeles Kings	NHL	49	23	15	10	2860	148	4	3.10	.892	2	0	2	126	8	0	3.81	.890
1979–80	Los Angeles Kings	NHL	50	18	22	7	2836	185	0	3.91	.869	4	1	2	207	14	0	4.06	.880
1980–81	Los Angeles Kings	NHL	64	35	18	11	3746	203	2	3.25	.893	4	1	3	220	20	0	5.45	.837
1981–82	Los Angeles Kings	NHL	52	13	28	8	2933	213	2	4.36	.856	10	4	5	583	41	0	4.22	.868
1982–83	Los Angeles Kings	NHL	19	3	10	2	888	68	1	4.59	.843	—	—	—	—	—	—	—	—
1982–83	Birmingham South Stars	CHL	8	4	2	0	405	28	0	4.15	.876	11	6	3	637	35	0	3.30	—
1983–84	Los Angeles Kings	NHL	6	0	4	1	266	26	0	5.86	.838	—	—	—	—	—	—	—	—
1983–84	New Haven Nighthawks	AHL	5	1	3	1	281	27	0	5.77	.830	—	—	—	—	—	—	—	—
NHL totals			240	92	97	39	13,529	843	9	3.74	.875	20	6	12	1,136	83	0	4.38	.867

"Lessard's stats". The Goaltender Home Page.
