= Glen Sharpley =

Canadian ice hockey player

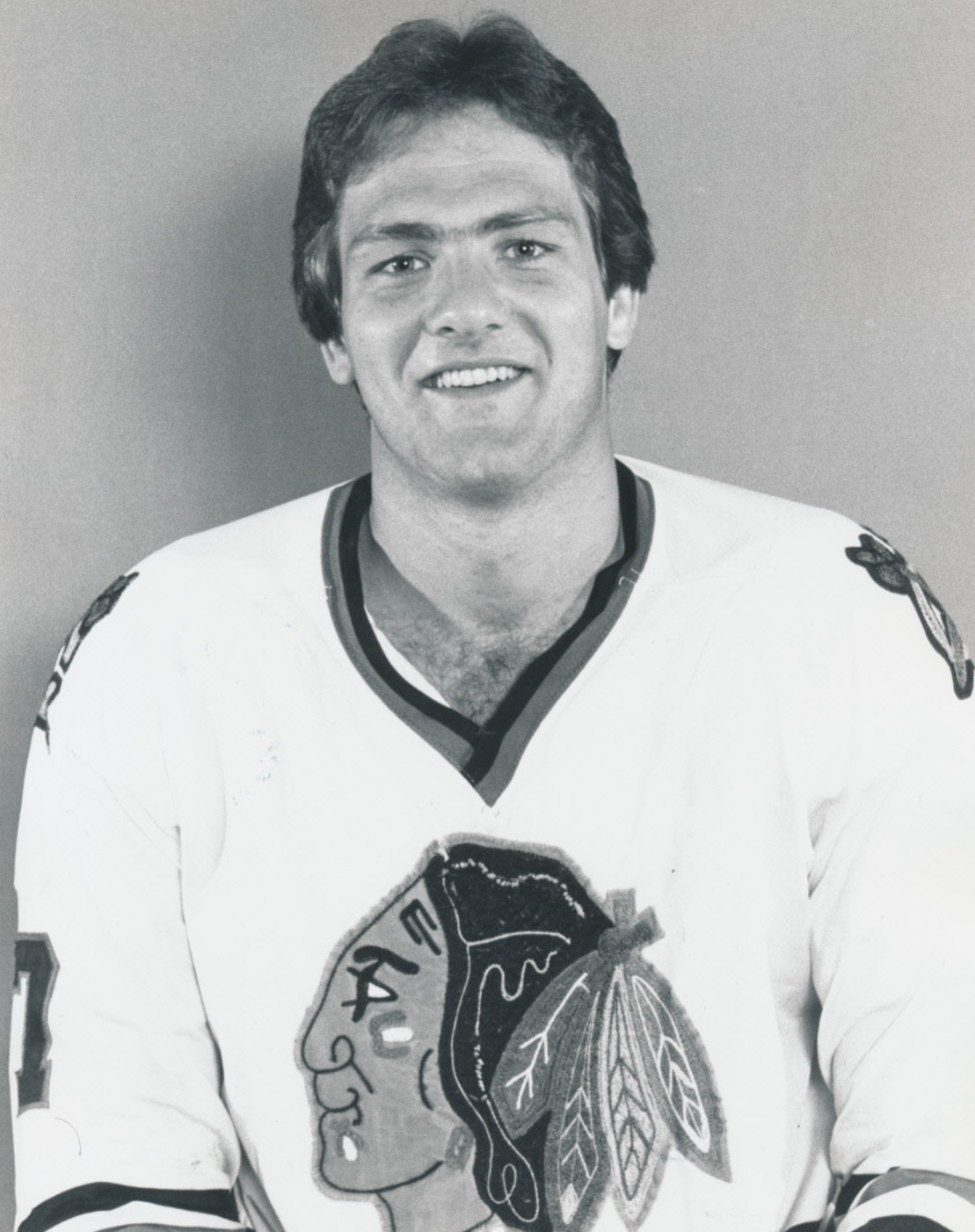
- Sharpley in 1981
- Born: September 6, 1956 (age 69) York, Ontario, Canada
- Height: 6 ft 0 in (183 cm)
- Weight: 190 lb (86 kg; 13 st 8 lb)
- Position: Center
- Shot: Right
- Played for: Minnesota North Stars; Chicago Blackhawks
- NHL draft: 3rd overall, 1976; Minnesota North Stars
- WHA draft: 3rd overall, 1976; Cleveland Crusaders
- Playing career: 1976–1987

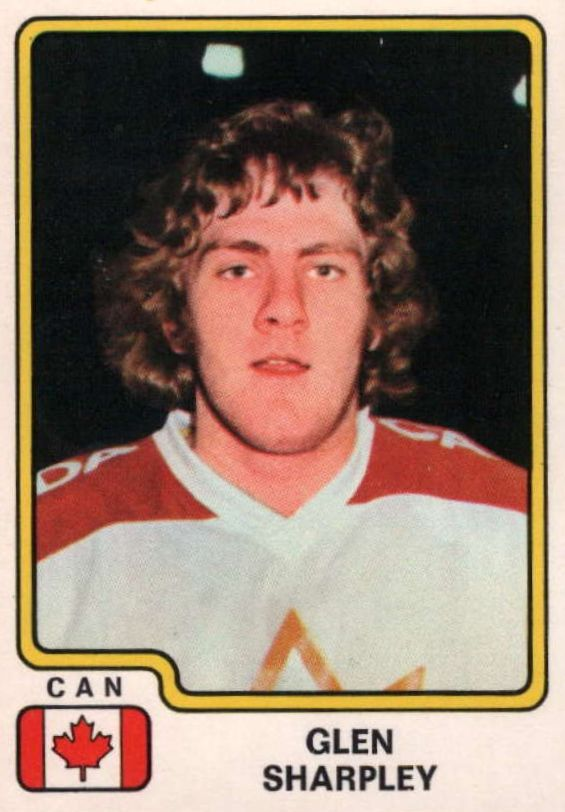
Glen Sharpley with the Team Canada in 1979

Glen Stuart Sharpley (born September 6, 1956) is a Canadian former professional ice hockey player who played 286 games in the National Hockey League with the Minnesota North Stars and Chicago Black Hawks. He now lives in Huntsville, Ontario, where he is the owner of Sharpley Source for Sports.

== International play ==
Medal record

Representing Canada

Ice hockey

World Championships
Bronze medal – third place	1978 Czechoslovakia	

== Career statistics ==
=== Regular season and playoffs ===
			Regular season					Playoffs
Season	Team	League	GP	G	A	Pts	PIM	GP	G	A	Pts	PIM
1972–73	Richmond Hill Rams	OPJHL	42	13	28	41	104	—	—	—	—	—
1973–74	Hull Festivals	QMJHL	52	14	30	44	64	—	—	—	—	—
1974–75	Hull Festivals	QMJHL	68	24	45	69	96	4	2	3	5	0
1975–76	Hull Festivals	QMJHL	69	60	74	134	97	6	7	4	11	13
1976–77	Minnesota North Stars	NHL	80	25	32	57	48	2	0	0	0	4
1977–78	Minnesota North Stars	NHL	79	22	33	55	42	—	—	—	—	—
1978–79	Minnesota North Stars	NHL	80	19	34	53	30	—	—	—	—	—
1979–80	Minnesota North Stars	NHL	51	20	27	47	38	9	1	6	7	4
1980–81	Minnesota North Stars	NHL	28	12	12	24	18	—	—	—	—	—
1980–81	Chicago Black Hawks	NHL	35	10	16	26	12	1	0	2	2	0
1981–82	Chicago Black Hawks	NHL	36	9	7	16	11	15	6	3	9	16
1983–84	EHC Arosa	NDA	8	5	8	13		—	—	—	—	—
1985–86	Baltimore Skipjacks	AHL	7	0	3	3	4	—	—	—	—	—
1985–86	Peoria Rivermen	IHL	50	26	37	63	32	—	—	—	—	—
1986–87	Salt Lake Golden Eagles	IHL	32	10	15	25	14	—	—	—	—	—
1986–87	Dundee Rockets	GBR	15	31	40	71	49	5	6	13	19	10
NHL totals			389	117	161	278	199	27	7	11	18	24

=== International ===
Year	Team	Event	GP	G	A	Pts	PIM
1978	Canada	WC	10	1	3	4	16

Preceded by Bryan Maxwell	Minnesota North Stars first-round draft pick 1976	Succeeded by Brad Maxwell
