= Dan Bonar =

Canadian ice hockey player

- Born: September 23, 1956 (age 69) Deloraine, Manitoba, Canada
- Height: 5 ft 8 in (173 cm)
- Weight: 170 lb (77 kg; 12 st 2 lb)
- Position: Centre
- Shot: Right
- Played for: Los Angeles Kings
- National team: Canada
- NHL draft: Undrafted
- Playing career: 1973–1985

Daniel Gordon Bonar (born September 23, 1956) is a Canadian former professional ice hockey forward who played 170 games in the National Hockey League for the Los Angeles Kings. During the playoff series known for the Miracle on Manchester Bonar scored the final two goals of game 5 to ice the series over the Wayne Gretzky-led Edmonton Oilers, completing one of the greatest upsets in playoff hockey history.

Bonar was born in Deloraine, Manitoba.

Bonar's sister Maureen is a World Senior Champion curler.

== Career statistics ==
| | | | Regular season | | | | | Playoffs |
| Season | Team | League | GP | G | A | Pts | PIM | GP | G | A | Pts | PIM |
|---|---|---|---|---|---|---|---|---|---|---|---|---|
| 1973–74 | Portage Terriers | MJHL | 48 | 39 | 41 | 80 | 81 | — | — | — | — | — |
| 1974–75 | Brandon Wheat Kings | WCHL | 70 | 43 | 41 | 84 | 62 | 5 | 2 | 4 | 6 | 10 |
| 1975–76 | Brandon Wheat Kings | WCHL | 69 | 44 | 59 | 103 | 49 | 5 | 2 | 3 | 5 | 0 |
| 1976–77 | Brandon Wheat Kings | WCHL | 72 | 75 | 50 | 125 | 70 | 16 | 6 | 14 | 20 | 44 |
| 1977–78 | Fort Wayne Komets | IHL | 79 | 47 | 61 | 108 | 43 | 11 | 6 | 9 | 15 | 6 |
| 1978–79 | Springfield Indians | AHL | 80 | 33 | 39 | 72 | 30 | — | — | — | — | — |
| 1979–80 | Binghamton Dusters | AHL | 64 | 29 | 32 | 61 | 91 | — | — | — | — | — |
| 1980–81 | Los Angeles Kings | NHL | 70 | 11 | 15 | 26 | 57 | 4 | 1 | 1 | 2 | 11 |
| 1981–82 | Los Angeles Kings | NHL | 79 | 13 | 23 | 36 | 111 | 10 | 2 | 3 | 5 | 11 |
| 1982–83 | Los Angeles Kings | NHL | 20 | 1 | 1 | 2 | 40 | — | — | — | — | — |
| 1982–83 | New Haven Nighthawks | AHL | 22 | 10 | 13 | 23 | 29 | 11 | 1 | 7 | 8 | 13 |
| 1983–84 | New Haven Nighthawks | AHL | 35 | 9 | 14 | 23 | 27 | — | — | — | — | — |
| 1983–84 | Nova Scotia Voyageurs | AHL | 44 | 14 | 23 | 37 | 75 | 12 | 4 | 7 | 11 | 38 |
| 1984–85 | Adirondack Red Wings | AHL | 31 | 3 | 13 | 16 | 43 | — | — | — | — | — |
| NHL totals | | | 169 | 25 | 39 | 54 | 208 | 14 | 3 | 4 | 7 | 22 |
| AHL totals | | | 276 | 98 | 134 | 232 | 295 | 23 | 5 | 14 | 19 | 51 |

== Awards and achievements ==
- Turnbull Cup (MJHL) Championship (1973)
- Centennial Cup Championship (1973)
- IHL Rookie of the Year (1978)
- IHL First All-Star Team (1978)
- IHL MVP (1978)
