= Ivan Boldirev =

Serbian ice hockey player (born 1949)

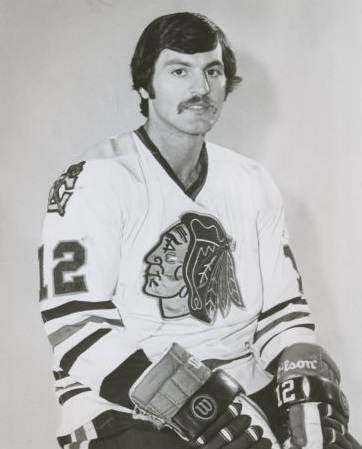
- Boldirev with the Chicago Black Hawks in 1974
- Born: August 15, 1949 (age 76) Zrenjanin, PR Serbia, Yugoslavia
- Height: 6 ft 0 in (183 cm)
- Weight: 190 lb (86 kg; 13 st 8 lb)
- Position: Centre
- Shot: Left
- Played for: Boston Bruins; California Golden Seals; Chicago Black Hawks; Atlanta Flames; Vancouver Canucks; Detroit Red Wings
- NHL draft: 11th overall, 1969; Boston Bruins
- Playing career: 1969–1985

Ivan Boldirev (Serbian Cyrillic: Иван Болдирев; born August 15, 1949) is a Serbian-Canadian former professional ice hockey player. Boldirev played 15 seasons and over 1,000 games in the National Hockey League (NHL) from 1970 through 1985. He featured in the 1982 Stanley Cup Final with the Vancouver Canucks. Boldirev was noted during his career as one of the sport's best stickhandlers.

== Amateur career ==
Born in Zrenjanin, Yugoslavia (now Serbia), Boldirev's family emigrated to Canada when he was two. Growing up in Sault Ste. Marie, Ontario, he was known as a shy child. Boldirev felt that his shyness "probably goes back to when I first came over to Canada and didn't speak any English. My first grade teacher sent a note home telling my parents that we should speak English at home, but they didn't speak it so they couldn't even read the note!"

Boldirev started playing junior hockey as a kid, initially joining his hometown Sault Ste. Marie Greyhounds of the Northern Ontario Junior Hockey League before moving to the Oshawa Generals of the Ontario Hockey Association in 1967-68.

He was the first choice (11th overall) of the Boston Bruins in the 1969 NHL amateur draft.

== Professional career ==
Boldirev turned pro in 1969 and spent his entire first season with Boston's CHL affiliate in Oklahoma City. Boldirev was called up to Boston as a spare player for the 1970 NHL playoffs, but did not play a game as Boston romped to their first championship since 1941. However, in a quirk of history, he managed to get his name engraved on the Stanley Cup before he dressed for his first NHL game.

Boldirev was back in Oklahoma City for the 1970–71, although he received his first NHL action with a two-game callup to the Bruins. Boston was as in a group of players (Reggie Leach and Rick MacLeish, each of whom would star for Flyers later in the decade, were others) who were good enough to play for many NHL squads but were instead stuck in Boston's system, and would need a trade to get the opportunity they wanted.

Boldirev started the 1971–72 as a depth player in Boston, but received his big break partway into the season when he was dealt to the hapless California Golden Seals. On the talent-starved Seals, Boldirev received the chance he needed and blossomed into a solid NHL player, finishing fourth on the team with 16 goals and 41 points. By 1973–74, he finished with 25 goals and 56 points.

In 1974, Boldirev was dealt to the Chicago Black Hawks, where he would go on to the most productive phase of his career. he posted 24 goals and 67 points in 1974–75. He posted 60+ points in each of his five seasons in Chicago, and by the late 1970s had replaced Stan Mikita as the team's top offensive player. He led the Black Hawks in goals, assists, and points in 1976–77 and 1977–78, and was selected to play in the 1978 NHL All-Star Game.

Boldirev was leading the Black Hawks in scoring again in 1978–79 when he was dealt to the Atlanta Flames late in the season in a huge nine–player trade. He contributed 14 points in 13 games after joining the Flames, but his stay in Atlanta would last less than a year before he was dealt to the Vancouver Canucks. Darcy Rota was moved along with Boldirev in both trades, and the two would be teammates (and frequently linemates) for nearly a decade with three different organizations.

After joining the Canucks, Boldirev went on a goal scoring binge to close out the 1979–80 season with 16 goals in 27 games. In Vancouver, he continued to be a consistent productive performer, and continued to dazzle fans with his elegant, effortless displays of stickhandling. He was a standout performer in Vancouver's run to the 1982 Stanley Cup Finals, scoring eight goals in 17 games after a 73-point regular season.

Boldirev's production dropped off in the 1982–83 season, as he registered just five goals and 25 points in his first 39 games. The Canucks sent him to the Detroit Red Wings for journeyman forward Mark Kirton. Boldirev proceeded to undergo a resurgence in Detroit, scoring 13 goals and 30 points in just 33 games with the Wings. In 1983–84, he had the most productive season of his career, matching his career high of 35 goals and setting a career high of 83 points. Boldirev combined with rookie Steve Yzerman to form an excellent one-two punch down the middle, and helped Detroit back to the playoffs for the first time since 1978.

In 1984–85, Boldirev played in his 1000th NHL game and notched his 500th assist, but his production waned as he failed to notch 50 points for the first time since 1973. He retired at the end of the season with career totals of 361 goals and 505 assists for 866 points in 1052 NHL games.

== Career statistics ==
=== Regular season and playoffs ===
| | | | Regular season | | | | | Playoffs |
| Season | Team | League | GP | G | A | Pts | PIM | GP | G | A | Pts | PIM |
|---|---|---|---|---|---|---|---|---|---|---|---|---|
| 1967–68 | Oshawa Generals | OHA | 50 | 18 | 26 | 44 | 76 | — | — | — | — | — |
| 1968–69 | Oshawa Generals | OHA | 54 | 25 | 34 | 59 | 101 | — | — | — | — | — |
| 1969–70 | Oklahoma City Blazers | CHL | 65 | 18 | 49 | 67 | 114 | — | — | — | — | — |
| 1970–71 | Boston Bruins | NHL | 2 | 0 | 0 | 0 | 0 | — | — | — | — | — |
| 1970–71 | Oklahoma City Blazers | CHL | 68 | 19 | 52 | 71 | 98 | 5 | 1 | 4 | 5 | 9 |
| 1971–72 | Boston Bruins | NHL | 11 | 0 | 2 | 2 | 6 | — | — | — | — | — |
| 1971–72 | California Golden Seals | NHL | 57 | 16 | 23 | 39 | 54 | — | — | — | — | — |
| 1972–73 | California Golden Seals | NHL | 56 | 11 | 23 | 34 | 58 | — | — | — | — | — |
| 1973–74 | California Golden Seals | NHL | 77 | 25 | 31 | 56 | 22 | — | — | — | — | — |
| 1974–75 | Chicago Black Hawks | NHL | 80 | 24 | 43 | 67 | 54 | 8 | 4 | 2 | 6 | 2 |
| 1975–76 | Chicago Black Hawks | NHL | 78 | 28 | 34 | 62 | 33 | 4 | 0 | 1 | 1 | 0 |
| 1976–77 | Chicago Black Hawks | NHL | 80 | 24 | 38 | 62 | 40 | 2 | 0 | 1 | 1 | 0 |
| 1977–78 | Chicago Black Hawks | NHL | 80 | 35 | 45 | 80 | 34 | 4 | 0 | 2 | 2 | 2 |
| 1978–79 | Chicago Black Hawks | NHL | 66 | 29 | 35 | 64 | 25 | — | — | — | — | — |
| 1978–79 | Atlanta Flames | NHL | 13 | 6 | 8 | 14 | 6 | 2 | 0 | 2 | 2 | 2 |
| 1979–80 | Atlanta Flames | NHL | 52 | 16 | 24 | 40 | 20 | — | — | — | — | — |
| 1979–80 | Vancouver Canucks | NHL | 27 | 16 | 11 | 27 | 14 | 4 | 0 | 2 | 2 | 0 |
| 1980–81 | Vancouver Canucks | NHL | 72 | 26 | 33 | 59 | 34 | 1 | 1 | 1 | 2 | 0 |
| 1981–82 | Vancouver Canucks | NHL | 78 | 33 | 40 | 73 | 45 | 17 | 8 | 3 | 11 | 4 |
| 1982–83 | Vancouver Canucks | NHL | 39 | 5 | 20 | 25 | 12 | — | — | — | — | — |
| 1982–83 | Detroit Red Wings | NHL | 33 | 13 | 17 | 30 | 14 | — | — | — | — | — |
| 1983–84 | Detroit Red Wings | NHL | 75 | 35 | 48 | 83 | 20 | 4 | 0 | 5 | 5 | 4 |
| 1984–85 | Detroit Red Wings | NHL | 75 | 19 | 30 | 49 | 16 | 2 | 0 | 1 | 1 | 0 |
| NHL totals | | | 1,052 | 361 | 505 | 866 | 507 | 48 | 13 | 20 | 33 | 14 |

== Awards and accomplishments ==
- Played in NHL-All Star game 1978
- OHL Second All-Star Team, 1969

== See also ==
- List of NHL players with 1,000 games played

| Preceded by Frank Spring | Boston Bruins first-round draft pick 1969 | Succeeded by Reggie Leach |
