= Grant Mulvey =

Canadian ice hockey player (born 1956)

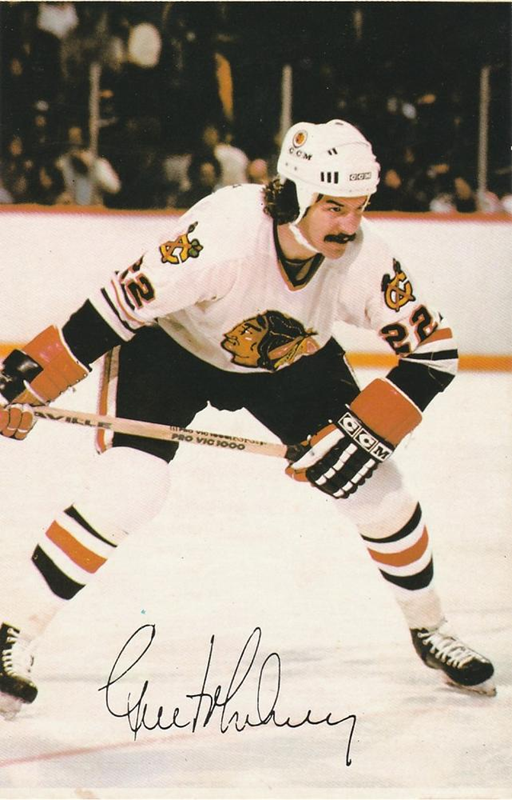
- Mulvey in 1981 photo
- Born: September 17, 1956 (age 69) Sudbury, Ontario, Canada
- Height: 6 ft 4 in (193 cm)
- Weight: 210 lb (95 kg; 15 st 0 lb)
- Position: Right wing
- Shot: Right
- Played for: Chicago Black Hawks; New Jersey Devils
- NHL draft: 16th overall, 1974; Chicago Black Hawks
- Playing career: 1974–1984

Grant "Granny" Mulvey (born September 17, 1956) is a Canadian former professional ice hockey player who played all but 12 games of his 586-game National Hockey League (NHL) career with the Chicago Black Hawks. A long line of injuries forced Mulvey to retire from the NHL. He is the brother of Paul Mulvey, who also played in the NHL.

Mulvey once held the record for being the youngest player since expansion in 1967 to score an NHL goal, scoring his first goal at the age of 18 years, 32 days. On October 3, 2013, Aleksander Barkov surpassed this feat by one day, scoring against the Dallas Stars at the age of 18 years, 31 days.

On February 3, 1982, in a game against the St. Louis Blues, Mulvey scored five goals and added two assists for seven points, setting a franchise record for most goals in a game. In the same game, he tied the record (shared with eleven others) for most goals in a single period (4).

Grant has made his home in Chicago, dedicating time to the Chicago Blackhawks Alumni Association. He is currently an active board member and Treasurer for the Blackhawk Alumni Association. As with many former athletes in Chicago, Grant values the opportunity to give back to the community by supporting many great charities.

Mulvey is a member of the Illinois Hockey Hall of Fame (2020 Inductee).

== Career statistics ==
| | | | Regular season | | | | | Playoffs |
| Season | Team | League | GP | G | A | Pts | PIM | GP | G | A | Pts | PIM |
|---|---|---|---|---|---|---|---|---|---|---|---|---|
| 1972–73 | Penticton Broncos | BCHL | 55 | 42 | 43 | 85 | 120 | — | — | — | — | — |
| 1973–74 | Calgary Centennials | WCHL | 68 | 31 | 31 | 62 | 192 | 14 | 4 | 6 | 10 | 55 |
| 1974–75 | Chicago Black Hawks | NHL | 74 | 7 | 4 | 11 | 36 | 6 | 2 | 0 | 2 | 6 |
| 1975–76 | Chicago Black Hawks | NHL | 64 | 11 | 17 | 28 | 72 | 4 | 0 | 0 | 0 | 2 |
| 1976–77 | Chicago Black Hawks | NHL | 80 | 10 | 14 | 24 | 111 | 2 | 1 | 0 | 1 | 2 |
| 1977–78 | Chicago Black Hawks | NHL | 78 | 14 | 24 | 38 | 135 | 4 | 2 | 2 | 4 | 0 |
| 1978–79 | Chicago Black Hawks | NHL | 80 | 19 | 15 | 34 | 99 | 1 | 0 | 0 | 0 | 2 |
| 1979–80 | Chicago Black Hawks | NHL | 80 | 39 | 26 | 65 | 122 | 7 | 1 | 1 | 2 | 8 |
| 1980–81 | Chicago Black Hawks | NHL | 42 | 18 | 14 | 32 | 81 | 3 | 0 | 0 | 0 | 0 |
| 1981–82 | Chicago Black Hawks | NHL | 73 | 30 | 19 | 49 | 141 | 15 | 4 | 2 | 6 | 50 |
| 1982–83 | Chicago Black Hawks | NHL | 3 | 0 | 0 | 0 | 0 | — | — | — | — | — |
| 1982–83 | Springfield Indians | AHL | 5 | 0 | 2 | 2 | 4 | — | — | — | — | — |
| 1983–84 | New Jersey Devils | NHL | 12 | 1 | 2 | 3 | 19 | — | — | — | — | — |
| 1983–84 | Maine Mariners | AHL | 29 | 6 | 8 | 14 | 49 | 16 | 5 | 2 | 7 | 39 |
| NHL totals | | | 586 | 149 | 135 | 284 | 816 | 42 | 10 | 5 | 15 | 70 |

== Coaching statistics ==
Season   Team           Lge  Type        GP  W   L  T OTL    Pct    Result 
1995-96  Chicago Wolves IHL  Head Coach  22  13  7  0   2  0.636  Lost in round 2 
1996-97  Chicago Wolves IHL  Head Coach  65  30  30 0   5  0.500  

| Preceded by Darcy Rota | Chicago Black Hawks first-round draft pick 1974 | Succeeded by Greg Vaydik |
