= Miracle on Manchester =

1982 National Hockey League playoff game

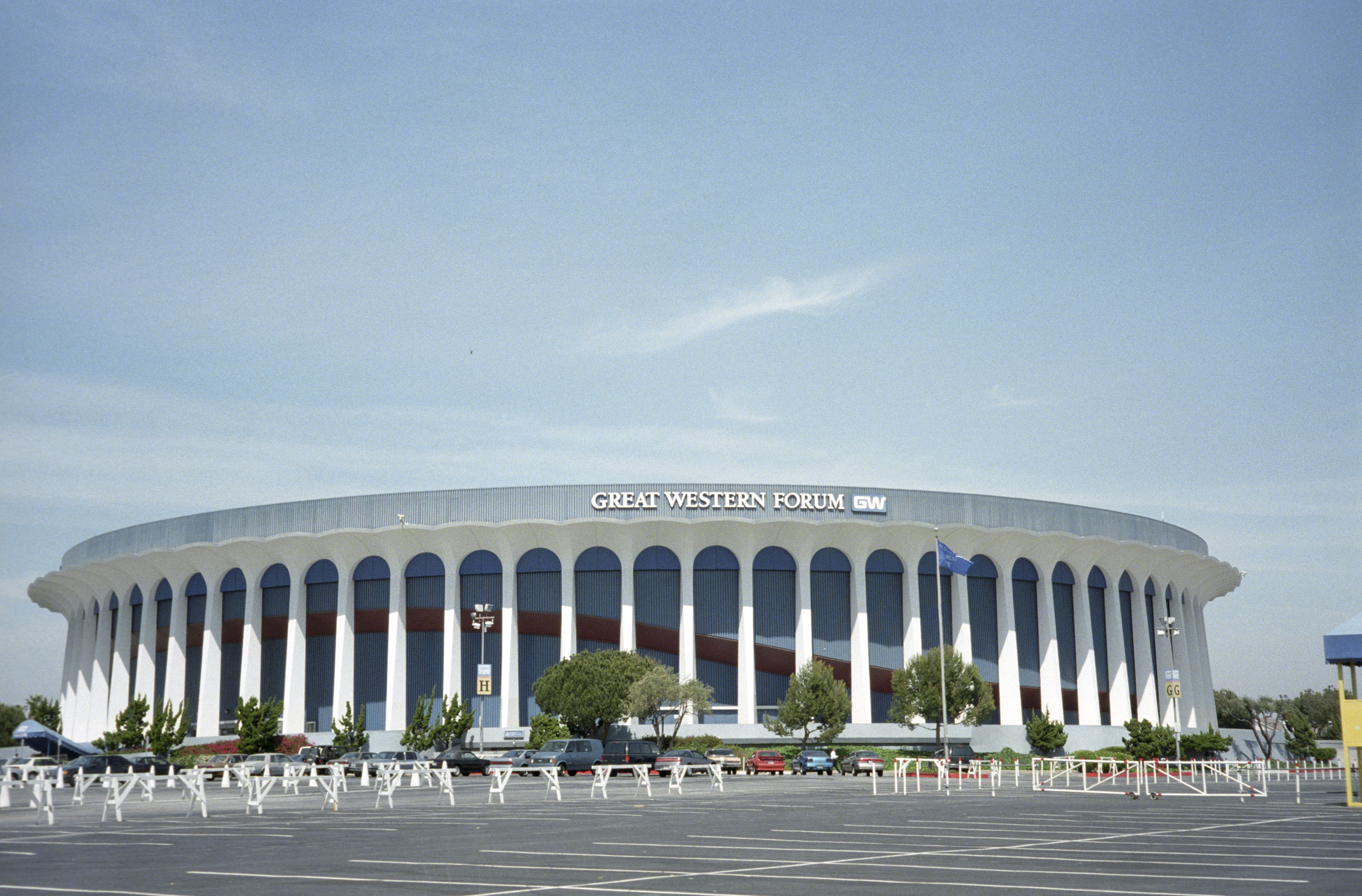
- The Los Angeles Forum, where the game took place.
	1	2	3	OT	Total
Edmonton Oilers	2	3	0	0	5
Los Angeles Kings	0	0	5	1	6
- Date: April 10, 1982
- Arena: The Forum
- City: Inglewood, California
- Attendance: 16,005

The Miracle on Manchester is the nickname given to a National Hockey League (NHL) playoff game between the Los Angeles Kings and Edmonton Oilers that took place on April 10, 1982 in the league's 65th season. The game, the third in a best-of-five postseason series, was played at The Forum, the Kings' home arena at the time, which is situated on Manchester Boulevard in the Los Angeles suburb of Inglewood. The Kings completed the largest comeback in NHL playoff history, going from being down 5–0 to win the game in overtime, 6–5. Combined with upset wins in Games 1 and 5, the Kings eliminated the heavily favored Oilers to reach the second round.

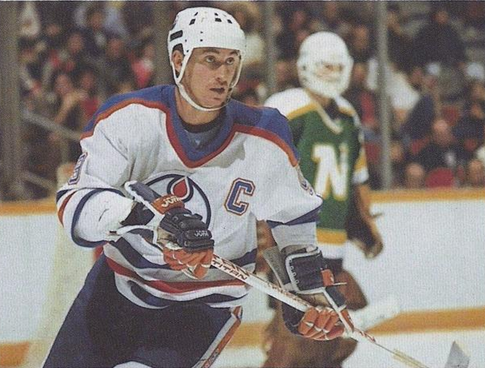
Wayne Gretzky (pictured in 1985) for the Oilers

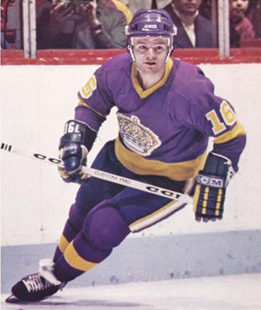
Marcel Dionne (pictured in 1979) for the Kings

== Background ==
The contest was the third in a five-game first-round playoff series between the Kings and Oilers. Under the playoff structure that existed at the time, the top four teams from each division qualified for the playoffs, with the first seed facing the fourth seed and the second and third seeds pairing off in the first round. In 1981–82, Edmonton won the division with 111 points, while Los Angeles finished in fourth place, 48 points behind.

=== Edmonton Oilers ===
The Oilers in their third season in the NHL, were dominant. Under the leadership of head coach and general manager Glen Sather, they finished first in the Clarence Campbell Conference and second best in the league after the New York Islanders. The Oilers, the only team in the Smythe Division to post a winning record, were the most potent offensive team in the NHL that year. They set an NHL record by scoring 417 goals, 32 more than any other team in 1981–82. The Oilers also had a capable defense for the time, allowing 295 goals, 26 fewer than the NHL average.

The Oilers’ offensive attack was led by Wayne Gretzky, Glenn Anderson, Mark Messier, and Jari Kurri. The defense was anchored by Kevin Lowe, Paul Coffey, and team captain Lee Fogolin. Edmonton featured the goalie tandem of Grant Fuhr and Andy Moog.

In 1981–82, Gretzky posted 92 goals, 120 assists, and 212 points, all league records, out-scoring his nearest rival for the scoring lead, Mike Bossy of the New York Islanders, by 65 points. Gretzky would win the Hart Memorial Trophy as the NHL's most valuable player for the third consecutive season.

=== Los Angeles Kings ===
After a 99-point season in 1980–81, they suffered through one of the worst one-year declines in NHL history, plummeting down to just 63 points in 1981–82. The team's fall precipitated a coaching change, as Don Perry replaced Parker MacDonald on January 11, 1982. Of the 16 playoff qualifiers in the NHL, Los Angeles had the poorest record. The Kings' total of 314 goals was lower than the league average of 321; they also allowed 369 goals, more than all but two teams in the NHL in 1981–82.

The Kings were led offensively by Marcel Dionne, who scored 117 points and was eighth in the NHL in scoring. Dave Taylor, Dionne's right winger on the Triple Crown Line was second on the team with 106 points. Dionne's usual left winger, Charlie Simmer, missed 30 games due to injury and tallied only 39 points during regular season play. Other offensive notables for the Kings included forward Jim Fox and rookie forward Steve Bozek, as well as defenseman Larry Murphy. This youthful presence in the Los Angeles lineup was further solidified by forwards Bernie Nicholls, Doug Smith, and Daryl Evans.

The high number of goals scored against the Kings was in part a reflection of an outmoded defensive mentality. The 1980s were a decade that witnessed an increasingly speedy game, one which seemed unstoppable to the Kings' old, rangy, "stay-at-home" blueliners of the 1970s. In addition, L.A.'s goaltending suffered a decline; starting goaltender Mario Lessard allowed 4.36 goals per game, one of the worst figures in the league. Backup goaltender Doug Keans fared little better, at 4.30 goals allowed per game.

During the 1981–82 regular season, the Kings and Oilers met eight times, with Edmonton going 5–1–2. The Oilers outscored the Kings 51 goals to 27.

== Games 1 and 2 ==
The series began in Edmonton's Northlands Coliseum, where the Oilers had a record of 31–5–4 during the regular season. Combining that mark with the Kings' season road record of 5–26–9 formed an expectation of the Oilers taking the first two games.

Before the series, Los Angeles coach Don Perry elected to utilize his team's youth and offensive speed to try to simply outscore the Oilers rather than shut them down. The Oilers led 4–1 at the start. Due to undisciplined play from Edmonton, the Kings answered back with four consecutive goals, three of which came on the power play, and would never trail the rest of the game en route to a 10–8 win. The 18 goals is still an NHL record for most goals scored in a Stanley Cup Playoff game.

In game two, both teams played more defensively, and thus was a low-scoring, more traditional style of playoff hockey, as the Kings and Oilers were tied 2–2 after regulation time had expired. In overtime, Gretzky took a shot from 40 feet out that went through a screen and past Lessard into the Kings' net. The 3–2 victory for Edmonton tied the series at one game apiece.

== Game three, the "Miracle" Game ==
The series shifted to the Forum, where the Kings were 19–15–6 during the regular season. Edmonton's season road record was 17–12–11.

=== First period ===
The Kings' fans were enthusiastic at the start of the game, but as in game two, the Oilers struck first. The Kings had just finished killing a penalty to Dave Taylor when Kings forward Dan Bonar jumped on a loose puck in the Oiler zone and took a shot on goal. Fuhr made the save, and the Oilers counter-attacked. A pass found Messier on the left wing, and he took a slap shot from about 25 feet out that went off Lessard's glove and into the net to give Edmonton a 1–0 lead.

While on the power play near the end of the first period, the Kings made another offensive rush at Fuhr, with Dionne taking a centering pass and sending a wrist shot toward the Oiler net. Fuhr made the save, and the rebound went to Gretzky. Gretzky then proceeded to carry the puck from his own end to the Kings' end, skating down the middle of the ice and in alone on two Kings, Korab and Evans. Gretzky faked to the outside and then shifted quickly back inside, bypassing Korab. Gretzky then skated toward the left side, where rookie Evans was holding his position but conceding space to Gretzky. Gretzky saw enough room for an opportunity to shoot, but had his stick lifted from behind by Simmer, who was backchecking. Nevertheless, Gretzky was able to get his stick back down to ice level long enough to fire a sharp-angled shot that beat Lessard on the short side for a short-handed goal to put the Oilers up 2–0.

=== Second period ===
As the second period started, the Kings were still on the power play, but the Oilers were able to mount another rush. Gretzky took the puck in the Oiler zone, skated through center ice and passed to Fogolin. Fogolin skated down the wing and sent a seemingly harmless snap shot toward Lessard. The Kings' goaltender misplayed the sharp angle of the shot, and it went by him on the short side. The Oilers had scored two short-handed goals on the same Kings' power play, and had taken control of the game with a 3–0 lead.

Later in the second period, both teams were playing with three skaters per side due to penalties. The Oilers' defenseman Risto Siltanen skated the puck through center ice and into the Kings' zone. The Oilers maintained control with sharp passing, but after an Oiler shot went wide of the net, the Kings' defender Mark Hardy appeared to have control of the puck. Gretzky swooped in behind the net and deftly stole the puck away. He then sent a quick pass over to Siltanen who one-timed a shot toward the net that seemed to zoom past Lessard into the net; it ricocheted against the end boards and around to the left side of the Kings' zone. The goal light was turned on by the goal judge, so play was stopped as the referees convened. It was determined that Siltanen's shot went through the net, and replays later confirmed it. The Oilers had increased their lead to 4–0.

The Oilers were on the power play, with four skaters against the Kings' three, when they went on the attack again. The Oilers obtained possession in the Kings' zone at the face-off, and as they had on their fourth goal, kept possession while moving the puck. The Oilers kept the puck on the outside until they saw an opening. Anderson took a pass to the right of the Kings' net and saw Gretzky sneak in behind Lessard and Kings' defenseman Rick Chartraw at the left side of the goal crease. Anderson sent a hard pass that went through Chartraw's legs and onto the stick of Gretzky, and all he had to do was deflect the puck into the net to give the Oilers a power play goal and a seemingly insurmountable 5–0 lead, and the score stayed that way as the second period came to a close.

Kings play by play announcer Bob Miller was quoted as saying "I was so upset because I thought, 'We do this every time, get everyone in L.A. excited about hockey and the Kings and then go right in the dumper.'" Kings owner Jerry Buss also left the game early, and was greeted with jeers from the Forum crowd. The home crowd had quieted considerably as the game turned into a rout. Kings captain Dave Lewis noted in a later interview that he and other Kings players were angered by the fact that several Oilers players were laughing at them as they went into their locker room at the end of the period.

=== Third period ===
Early in the third period, with both teams at four skaters per side, the Kings gained possession of the puck in the neutral zone and tried an attack on the Oiler net. The Kings had a two-on-one with Dionne and Larry Murphy, but Dionne's setup pass was missed by Murphy, and the puck went toward the right wing boards. The Kings were able to regain control of the puck, and tried to set up another attack in the Oiler zone, when Dionne again obtained possession of the puck at the right point. Dionne sent a pass toward the left wing, where the puck ricocheted softly off of the boards and on to the stick of Jay Wells. Wells skated in from the left point, noticed Taylor was obstructing the sight line of Oiler goalie Fuhr, and took a shot from 30 feet out that went through the legs of Taylor and into the right side of the net past Fuhr at 2:36 to put the Kings on the scoreboard. The score now stood at 5–1.

Less than three minutes later, the Kings went on another power play as the Oilers got another penalty. The Kings won the face-off, and sent the puck back to Hardy, who threw a shot at the net from the left point. Fuhr made the save, but the rebound went directly in front of the net, toward Oiler defenseman Kevin Lowe. Lowe tried to gain possession of the puck quickly and clear it out of danger, but the puck was caught between his skates, and Lowe couldn't spot it. Kings' forward Doug Smith saw the puck, however; Smith quickly stepped toward Lowe, reached between the defender's skates, and took a shot that went directly under the crossbar and into the Oiler net. It was a power play goal, and the Kings had narrowed the gap to 5–2.

Both teams were again playing at four skaters per side when the Oilers went to gain possession of the puck behind their own net. The attempted Oiler clearing pass, however, was intercepted on the right wing by Kings' forward Dean Hopkins, who took a stride forward and passed to Charlie Simmer. Simmer skated around an Oiler defender, then cut back toward the net. While falling down, Simmer tried to jam the puck into the right side of the net, but Fuhr's left foot blocked the puck. Oiler defenseman Randy Gregg, skating into the play, in trying to use his stick to tie up the stick of Simmer inadvertently hit Fuhr's leg. Fuhr was knocked back enough to allow the puck to slide over the goal line, and the goal brought the Kings to within two, at 5–3. This was the goal that really got the crowd back into the game and made the Kings believe they could actually pull the game out.

With only five minutes to play, veteran Oilers forward Garry Unger – who had played the previous season with the Kings – brought his stick blade up into the face of Dave Lewis behind the Kings' net. Lewis' face was cut, so Unger was assessed an automatic five-minute major penalty for high sticking. Since Lewis was also penalized two minutes for roughing in the ensuing moments following the high stick, both teams would be four skaters per side for two minutes. After the two minutes were up, the Kings would have the last three minutes with a man advantage, as the major to Unger would still be running.

During the four-on-four situation, Kings forward Steve Bozek gained possession of the puck at center ice. Bozek skated into the Oiler zone on the left wing, then quickly moved to his right, toward the center. He then dropped a pass back to Hardy, who was behind Bozek and skating the opposite way (toward the left wing). The criss-cross put the Oilers out of position for a split second, and Hardy used the small window of time to cut in past Gretzky and take a wrist shot back against the grain, toward the right side of the net. Fuhr, surprised at the quick shot, tried to slide to his left to keep the puck out, but he was unsuccessful. The puck was in the net, the Kings' crowd went wild, and the Kings were now trailing 5–4.

Soon after the Hardy goal, the Kings' three-minute power play began. There was an anxious moment for the Kings, as Oiler forward Pat Hughes gained a loose puck at center ice and had a clean breakaway. Hughes skated in alone on King goalie Lessard and took a low shot, but Lessard was able to block it. There was a small rebound for Hughes, but by the time Hughes regained the puck, he was too close to Lessard and didn't have time to shoot. All Hughes could do was knock the puck into Lessard's waiting glove, and Lessard covered the puck to stop play.

The Kings had trouble setting up the puck in the Oiler zone on the major power play, and game time was dwindling away. When play was stopped with 1:37 left, Perry changed goaltenders for the Kings, bringing on Doug Keans to replace Lessard. Under the rules in effect at the time, the game was suspended for several minutes while Keans took practice shots from his teammates, giving the power-play unit time to rest. At the next whistle with 1:14 remaining, Lessard returned to the net (without a warm-up). Finally, with a minute left, the Kings pulled Lessard for an extra attacker to essentially give them a two-skater advantage over the Oilers. With forty-five seconds to go, Dionne gained clear possession of the puck to the right of the Oiler net. Dionne stickhandled for 20 to 25 seconds, desperately looking for an open lane to pass or shoot. At last, Dionne sent the puck to Simmer and headed to the front of the net. Simmer sent Dionne a return pass, and Dionne took a quick wrist shot on net, but the shot was kicked aside by Fuhr. The rebound slid over to the right-wing boards, where Gretzky tried to gain control of it. Jim Fox quickly moved in to harass Gretzky, frantically waving his stick along the ice to knock the puck away, and moving his body between Gretzky and the puck to gain control.

In the last ten seconds, Fox sent the puck back to Hardy, who was farther away from the net, but was positioned in the center of the Oiler zone. Hardy took the pass and sent a low shot toward the net. Fuhr managed to make the save, but could not control the rebound, and the puck squirted out in front of the net. The Oilers were doing their best to contain the dangerous Dionne, and they kept him away from the loose puck. Unfortunately for the Oilers, Kings' left-wing Bozek had drifted from his normal position and was moving toward the front of the net. The Oilers, being two men short, were not positioned to defend Bozek, and watched in horror as the puck slid perfectly toward the King rookie's stick. Bozek immediately took a quick backhanded shot toward the net. Fuhr did not have enough time to react and adjust his position for Bozek's shot, and was helpless as the puck sailed between his pads and into the net. With only five seconds to go, the Kings had completed a historic comeback. The game was tied, 5-5.

The Kings' crowd was electrified at the scoring of the tying goal; the roar from the stands would continue for several minutes. The Kings on the ice formed a joyous group around Bozek, all of them tired, but ecstatic. The Oiler players on the ice, by contrast, were in disbelief, and lying down on the ice. Goaltender Fuhr had dropped to one knee and hung his head in disappointment. All that was left of regulation time was a face-off at center ice. The last five seconds quickly elapsed, and the teams headed to their respective locker rooms to prepare for their second consecutive overtime game.

=== Overtime ===
In overtime, the Kings almost met with immediate disaster. A bouncing puck was shot in from center ice toward Kings' goalie Lessard, and he had trouble handling it cleanly. The puck began to slide out in front of the Kings' net. Lessard, fearing that the Oilers would regain possession of the puck, decided to leave his goal crease and chase the puck down. He went into a slide, but in doing so, he collided with Oiler Glenn Anderson about 40 feet in front of the Kings' net and the puck moved even farther out of his reach. By this time, Mark Messier had skated into the Kings' zone and took the puck on his backhand. With Lessard out of the net, Messier had an opportunity to score the winning goal into the open net. The Kings' Mark Hardy scrambled to get in front of the net as Messier unleashed a backhand shot. Unfortunately for Messier, the puck rolled off the end of his stick blade, and the shot sailed harmlessly to the right of the Kings' net. The Kings covered the puck behind their own net. Lessard had quickly skated back to his net as the Kings were covering the puck, and he leaned on the crossbar with his head down.

Later in the overtime period, the Kings had a scoring chance, as Doug Smith entered the Oiler zone with an open lane on the right wing. He took a hard shot, but Fuhr was in perfect position to catch the puck with his glove. He caught and controlled the puck long enough for play to be stopped. The ensuing face-off to restart play would take place in the Oiler zone to Fuhr's left. Kings' head coach Don Perry sent out an all-rookie forward line for the face-off: Bozek on left wing, Smith at center, and Daryl Evans on right wing. Smith won the face-off from Messier, gently drawing the puck back. As the puck slid back, Evans skated in behind Smith and immediately started swinging his stick back and took a slap shot. The shot swiftly headed toward the upper portion of the Oiler net. Fuhr brought his glove up to make the save, but the shot was moving too fast, and Fuhr was a fraction of a second too late. The puck went into the net at two minutes and 35 seconds of overtime, winning the game for the Kings, 6–5.

=== Box score ===
April 10, 1982	Edmonton Oilers	5-6	OT	Los Angeles Kings	The Forum

Number in parentheses represents the player's total in goals or assists to that point of the playoffs

Scoring summary
Period	Team	Goal	Assist(s)	Time	Score
1st	EDM	Mark Messier (1)	Glenn Anderson (3)	10:39	1–0 EDM
1st	EDM	Wayne Gretzky (3) – sh	Unassisted	19:23	2–0 EDM
2nd	EDM	Lee Fogolin (1) – sh	Wayne Gretzky (5) and Kevin Lowe (2)	0:43	3–0 EDM
2nd	EDM	Risto Siltanen (3)	Wayne Gretzky (6)	5:15	4–0 EDM
2nd	EDM	Wayne Gretzky (4) – pp	Glenn Anderson (4) and Randy Gregg (1)	14:02	5–0 EDM
3rd	LAK	Jay Wells (1)	Marcel Dionne (2) and Larry Murphy (2)	2:46	5–1 EDM
3rd	LAK	Doug Smith (2) – pp	Mark Hardy (1) and Jerry Korab (1)	5:58	5–2 EDM
3rd	LAK	Charlie Simmer (2)	Dean Hopkins (2)	14:38	5–3 EDM
3rd	LAK	Mark Hardy (1)	Steve Bozek (1) and Larry Murphy (3)	15:59	5–4 EDM
3rd	LAK	Steve Bozek (2) – pp	Mark Hardy (2) and Marcel Dionne (3)	19:55	5–5
OT	LAK	Daryl Evans (4)	Doug Smith (2)	02:35	6–5 LAK
Penalty summary
Period	Team	Player	Penalty	Time	PIM
1st	EDM	Glenn Anderson	Slashing	00:08	2:00
1st	LAK	Steve Bozek	Cross-checking	00:08	2:00
1st	LAK	Jerry Korab	Charging	04:37	2:00
1st	EDM	Wayne Gretzky	High-sticking	07:34	2:00
1st	LAK	Dave Taylor	Elbowing	08:25	2:00
1st	EDM	Mark Messier	Hooking	13:15	2:00
1st	LAK	Charlie Simmer	Cross-checking	15:37	2:00
1st	EDM	Dave Hunter	Holding	18:46	2:00
1st	EDM	Garry Unger	Slashing	18:50	2:00
1st	LAK	Bernie Nicholls	Hooking	18:50	2:00
2nd	LAK	Mark Hardy	Holding	01:15	2:00
2nd	EDM	Mark Messier	Slashing	02:52	2:00
2nd	LAK	Dave Lewis	High-sticking	02:52	2:00
2nd	EDM	Dave Hunter	Roughing	04:16	2:00
2nd	EDM	Garry Unger	Roughing	04:16	2:00
2nd	LAK	Larry Murphy	Roughing	04:16	2:00
2nd	LAK	Jay Wells	Roughing	04:16	2:00
2nd	EDM	Paul Coffey	Holding	06:39	2:00
2nd	EDM	Dave Lumley	Interference	10:01	2:00
2nd	LAK	Dean Hopkins	Slashing	10:01	2:00
2nd	EDM	Dave Hunter	High-sticking	11:10	2:00
2nd	EDM	Dave Hunter	Misconduct	11:10	10:00
2nd	LAK	Dave Taylor	High-sticking – double minor	11:10	4:00
2nd	EDM	Charlie Huddy	Roughing	13:03	2:00
2nd	LAK	Doug Smith	Holding	13:03	2:00
2nd	EDM	Garry Unger	Holding	14:51	2:00
2nd	EDM	Lee Fogolin	Hooking	15:51	2:00
2nd	EDM	Tom Roulston	Interference	18:07	2:00
3rd	LAK	Doug Smith	Tripping	01:03	2:00
3rd	EDM	Randy Gregg	Misconduct	02:23	10:00
3rd	EDM	Dave Lumley	Roughing	02:23	2:00
3rd	EDM	Dave Lumley	Fighting – major	02:23	5:00
3rd	LAK	Bernie Nicholls	Fighting – major	02:23	5:00
3rd	LAK	Charlie Simmer	Misconduct	02:23	10:00
3rd	EDM	Pat Hughes	High-sticking	05:51	2:00
3rd	EDM	Brett Callighen	Slashing	06:33	2:00
3rd	EDM	Charlie Huddy	Misconduct	10:04	10:00
3rd	EDM	Jari Kurri	Misconduct	10:04	10:00
3rd	EDM	Dave Lumley	Fighting – major	10:04	5:00
3rd	EDM	Risto Siltanen	Misconduct	10:04	10:00
3rd	LAK	Dan Bonar	Fighting – major	10:04	5:00
3rd	LAK	Daryl Evans	Misconduct	10:04	10:00
3rd	LAK	Jerry Korab	Misconduct	10:04	10:00
3rd	LAK	Dave Lewis	High-sticking	10:04	2:00
3rd	LAK	Mike Murphy	Misconduct	10:04	10:00
3rd	LAK	Mike Murphy	Game misconduct	10:04	10:00
3rd	LAK	Bernie Nicholls	Slashing	10:13	2:00
3rd	LAK	Bernie Nicholls	Unsportsmanlike conduct	10:13	2:00
3rd	LAK	Bernie Nicholls	Misconduct	10:13	10:00
3rd	EDM	Garry Unger	High sticking – major	15:00	5:00
3rd	EDM	Garry Unger	Misconduct	15:00	10:00
3rd	LAK	Dave Lewis	Hooking	15:00	2:00
3rd	LAK	Dave Lewis	Misconduct	15:00	10:00
OT	None				

Shots by period
Team	1	2	3	OT	Total
Edmonton	13	12	10	1	36
Los Angeles	14	17	18	3	52

== Games 4 and 5 ==
There was still one more game to be played in the Forum: game four. Once again, the game was close. The Oilers took a 3–1 lead at 14:44 of the second period when Glenn Anderson scored. Despite a third period goal by the Kings' Mike Murphy, the Oilers held on to defeat the Kings, 3–2, and send the series back to Edmonton for game five. Glen Sather, in response to Kings public relations director Scott Carmichael cheering near the dressing rooms after the "miracle" game three, said to Carmichael after game four, "you aren't cheering tonight, are you?" followed by an altercation that ended after several Oilers players intervened on Sather's behalf.

In a rare occurrence, both teams had to board the same plane heading back to Edmonton (charter flights were not the norm back then for NHL teams). The flight left at 1:30am, and the game was to be played that night on April 13. The Oilers were seated in the back and the Kings sat in the front. After landing in Edmonton and arriving at their hotel, the Kings players were confronted by a cleaning lady saying, "you didn't treat my boys very well in Los Angeles." Mark Hardy looked at her and said, "Lady, it's 5:30 in the morning – go home and go to bed!"

Back on home ice for game five, the Oilers again appeared to have the advantage. But the Kings, realizing that they had matched Edmonton goal-for-goal thus far in the series, were confident and loose as the game got underway. The Los Angeles team forged ahead 2–0, with both goals being scored by Simmer. The Kings' second-year forward Dan Bonar, the forward chosen to check Wayne Gretzky, chipped in with two goals of his own. The stunned Edmonton fans looked on as two King rookies grabbed the spotlight: new playoff hero Daryl Evans, who scored a pair of goals, and Bernie Nicholls, who scored at 6:49 of the second period to put the Kings in front to stay. The Kings led 6–2 after the second period, and would go on to win by a score of 7–4. The first place Oilers had been eliminated from the playoffs, despite Gretzky's 12 points (five goals and seven assists) in the series. Bob Miller, long-time Kings play-by-play announcer, wrote that after the game: "I was so excited that I wanted to call home, but the only pay phone I could find was near the Oilers dressing room. The Oilers wives and girlfriends were in tears as I shouted to my wife over the phone, 'wasn't that a great game?'"

A combined total of 50 goals were scored by the two teams in the five-game series, a new NHL record. The Kings also set a record for most goals by one team in a five-game series, with 27. Other NHL records that fell included the most goals by both teams in one game (18, in game one) and the biggest series upset in the Stanley Cup playoffs, as the Kings had finished 48 points behind Edmonton in the regular season.

== Aftermath ==
The "Miracle on Manchester" remains the biggest single-game comeback in Stanley Cup playoffs history. The Kings clawed their way back from a 5–0 deficit to start the third period to win the game in overtime. Despite the upset against the Oilers, the Kings were eliminated in the next round by the Vancouver Canucks, 4–1. Vancouver would advance to the 1982 Stanley Cup Final, where they were swept by the New York Islanders in four games.

In the 1982–83 NHL season, the Oilers advanced to the Stanley Cup Final against the Islanders, but were swept in four games. But Edmonton would go on to win the Stanley Cup in 1984, 1985, 1987, 1988 and 1990.

The "Miracle on Manchester" would prove to be the Kings' only bright spot during the early-1980s. The next two seasons continued the losing trend that began in 1981, as they missed the playoffs in both seasons. The Kings and Oilers would meet again in the playoffs in 1985 and 1987, with the Oilers easily winning both series (3–0 in 1985 and 4–1 in 1987) en route to winning the Stanley Cup both of those years. It wasn't until Wayne Gretzky was traded to Los Angeles in 1988–89 that the franchise turned around, as he led the Kings to an upset of the defending champion Oilers in 1989 after a 3–1 deficit before losing in the second round to the eventual Stanley Cup champions the Calgary Flames. The Kings suffered second round eliminations during the 1990 (in which the Oilers won another Stanley Cup) and 1991 playoffs while losing in the first round in the 1992 playoffs, all three losses to Wayne Gretzky's former teammates from the Oilers. In 1992–93, the Oilers failed to make the playoffs, after being eliminated by a 5–1 regular season loss to the Kings who were without Gretzky for a significant part of the regular season. The 1993 playoffs was also the first time that the Kings advanced to the Conference Finals, defeating the Toronto Maple Leafs to reach their first Cup Finals in franchise history, where they lost to the Montreal Canadiens. From 1994 to 2011 the Kings won just one playoff series, during the 2001 postseason when they upset the Detroit Red Wings in six games (featuring the game four "Stunner at Staples") and coming back from a 3–1 deficit to push the eventual Cup champions Colorado Avalanche to seven games. The Kings made three straight conference finals appearances from 2012 to 2014, with their 2014 playoff run including three series that went to seven games (and trailing 0–3 and 2–3 in the first two series), going on to win the Cup in 2012 and 2014.

On the 40-year anniversary of Miracle on Manchester, the Kings introduced their second Reverse Retro jersey, inspired by the event, with white being the base colour for the first time rather than purple or gold.

== Bibliography ==
- The National Hockey League Official Guide and Record Book, 1981–1982. Published by the National Hockey League, 1982.
- Miracle on Manchester. Video produced by the Los Angeles Kings, 1982.
- Los Angeles Kings 25th Anniversary Commemorative Video. Video produced by the Los Angeles Kings, 1991.
- NHL Overtime: Heroes and Drama of the Stanley Cup playoffs. video produced by the National Hockey League, 2000.
- Miller, Bob. Tales From the Los Angeles Kings, Sports Publishing LLC, 2006.
