= Darcy Rota =

Canadian ice hockey player (born 1953)

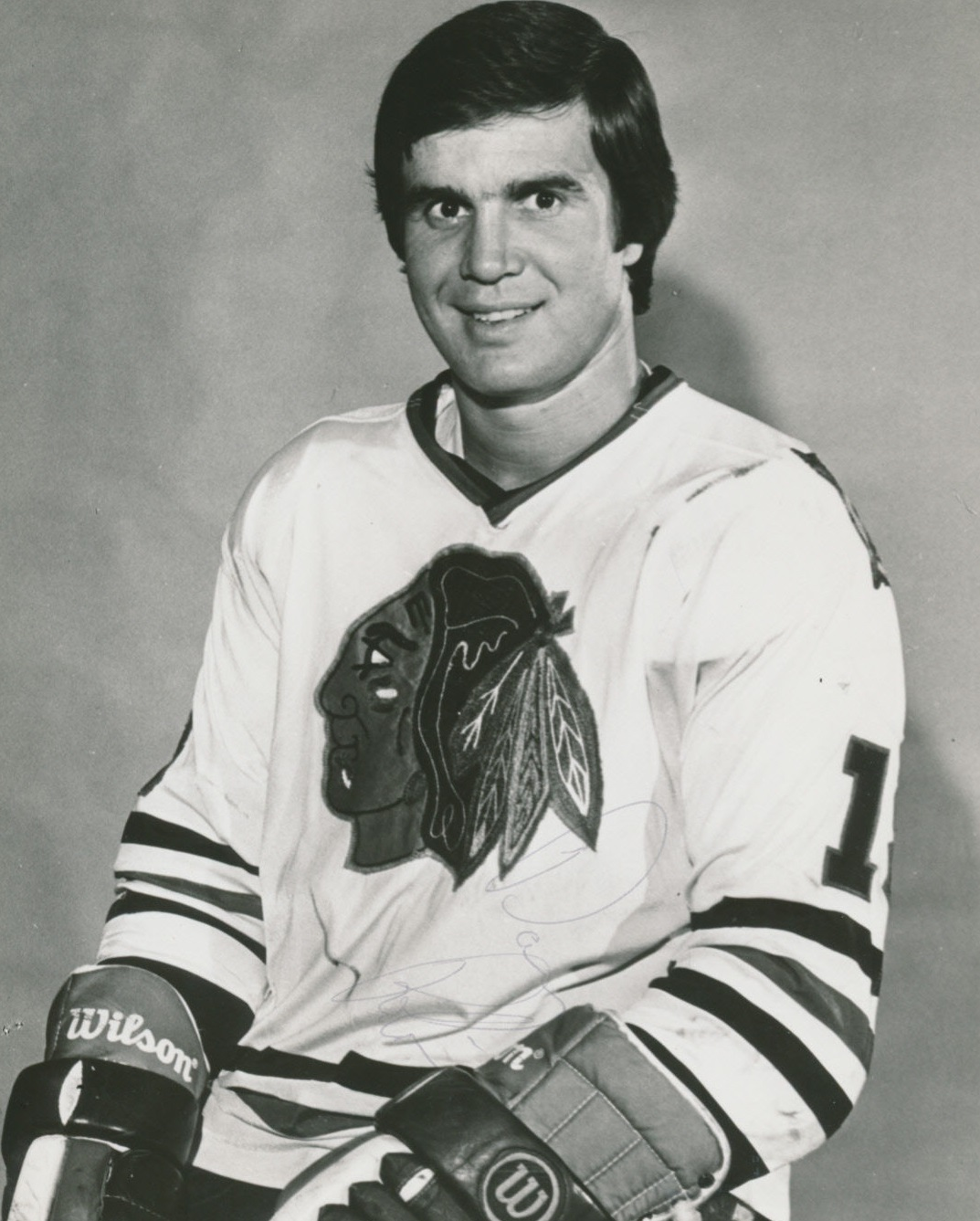
- Rota in 1978
- Born: February 16, 1953 (age 73) Vancouver, British Columbia, Canada
- Height: 5 ft 11 in (180 cm)
- Weight: 180 lb (82 kg; 12 st 12 lb)
- Position: Left wing
- Shot: Left
- Played for: Chicago Black Hawks; Atlanta Flames; Vancouver Canucks
- NHL draft: 13th overall, 1973; Chicago Black Hawks
- WHA draft: 9th overall, 1973; Houston Aeros
- Playing career: 1973–1984

Darcy Irwin Rota (born February 16, 1953) is a Canadian former professional ice hockey player who spent eleven seasons in the National Hockey League (NHL). He featured in the 1982 Stanley Cup Finals with the Vancouver Canucks.

== Playing career ==
Born in Vancouver, British Columbia, Rota's formative years including Bantam / Midget level hockey were in Prince George, British Columbia. Rota played his junior hockey with the Edmonton Oil Kings of the WCHL, helping the club reach the Memorial Cup in 1971 and 1972. A dangerous sniper, he led the WCHL in goals in 1972–73, notching 73 in just 68 games en route to a 129-point season. Following the season, he was selected 13th overall by the Chicago Black Hawks in the 1973 NHL Amateur Draft.

Rota stepped straight into the Black Hawks' roster in 1973–74, and turned in a solid rookie season with 21 goals and 33 points in 74 games. Over the next several seasons, Rota developed into a solid, gritty, two-way player who made a solid contribution at both ends of the ice, although he didn't develop into the type of scorer it was thought he could be when he was drafted. He scored at least 20 goals in each of his first four seasons in Chicago, with his best year as a Black Hawk coming in 1976–77 when he co-led the team with 24 goals.

Late in the 1978–79 season, Rota was dealt along with Ivan Boldirev to the Atlanta Flames in a blockbuster trade which saw Tom Lysiak moving to Chicago. He started off well in Atlanta with 9 goals in 13 games to close the season, but struggled in 1979–80 with just 18 points through 44 games. Midway through the season, he and Boldirev were dealt again, this time to the Vancouver Canucks, giving a delighted Rota a chance to play for his hometown team.

Rota's first full season as a Canuck in 1980–81 would be the best in his career to that point, as he notched career highs with 25 goals and 56 points. He would miss a substantial chunk of the 1981–82 campaign with a knee injury, but was a key component of the squad that reached the 1982 Stanley Cup finals, notching 6 goals in 17 playoff games.

For the 1982–83 season, Rota spent much of the year on a dynamic line with Thomas Gradin and Stan Smyl, and turned in the finest year of his career. He led the team in goals with 42 and finished with 81 points, both of which set club records (since broken by Markus Näslund) for a left winger.

Rota continued to excel in 1983–84, and was selected to play in his first NHL All-Star Game. He appeared to be on target for another season of close to 40 goals when he suffered a serious neck injury on a check from Jay Wells of the Los Angeles Kings. He managed to return for the playoffs, but was eventually forced to undergo spinal fusion surgery in the summer of 1984. He attempted to rejoin the Canucks in November of that year, but was warned that he risked further injury if he continued to play. After a few practices, he opted to retire.

Rota finished his career with 256 goals and 239 assists for 495 points in 794 NHL games, along with 973 penalty minutes. Rota fans called themselves the "Rota Rooters."

== Management career ==
Rota was hired to work in public relations for the Canucks, and served in various positions in the team's front office, including a spell as Director of Player Development, until they parted ways in 1990. He then spent a stretch working for the NHL as an assistant to league president John Ziegler. From 1994 to 1996 he served as a commentator on Canucks TV telecasts alongside Jim Robson.

In 1998, Rota became head coach of the expansion Burnaby Bulldogs of the BCHL. Rota resides in the city of Coquitlam, and in 2000 he became part-owner, president, and general manager of the expansion Coquitlam Express of the BCHL. He built the team which won the 2006 Royal Bank Cup. Rota left the organization after the 2014 season.

== Career statistics ==
			Regular season					Playoffs
Season	Team	League	GP	G	A	Pts	PIM	GP	G	A	Pts	PIM
1970–71	Edmonton Oil Kings	WCHL	64	43	39	82	60	17	13	10	23	15
1971–72	Edmonton Oil Kings	WCHL	67	51	54	105	68	16	8	9	17	11
1972–73	Edmonton Oil Kings	WCHL	68	73	56	129	104	4	5	4	9	14
1973–74	Chicago Black Hawks	NHL	74	21	12	33	58	11	3	0	3	11
1974–75	Chicago Black Hawks	NHL	78	22	22	44	93	7	0	1	1	24
1975–76	Chicago Black Hawks	NHL	79	20	17	37	73	4	1	0	1	2
1976–77	Chicago Black Hawks	NHL	76	24	22	46	82	2	0	0	0	0
1977–78	Chicago Black Hawks	NHL	78	17	20	37	67	4	0	0	0	2
1978–79	Chicago Black Hawks	NHL	63	13	17	30	77	—	—	—	—	—
1978–79	Atlanta Flames	NHL	13	9	5	14	21	2	0	1	1	26
1979–80	Atlanta Flames	NHL	44	10	8	18	49	—	—	—	—	—
1979–80	Vancouver Canucks	NHL	26	5	6	11	29	4	2	0	2	8
1980–81	Vancouver Canucks	NHL	80	25	31	56	124	3	2	1	3	14
1981–82	Vancouver Canucks	NHL	51	20	20	40	139	17	6	3	9	54
1982–83	Vancouver Canucks	NHL	73	42	39	81	88	3	0	0	0	6
1983–84	Vancouver Canucks	NHL	59	28	20	48	73	3	0	1	1	0
NHL totals			794	256	239	495	973	60	14	7	21	147

== Awards ==
- WCHL Second All-Star Team – 1972
- WCHL All-Star Team – 1973

Preceded by Phil Russell	Chicago Black Hawks first-round draft pick 1973	Succeeded by Grant Mulvey
Preceded by None	Houston Aeros first round draft pick 1973	Succeeded by Dick Spannbauer
