= Mike Moffat (ice hockey) =

Canadian goaltender (born 1962)

- Born: February 4, 1962 (age 64) Galt, Ontario, Canada
- Height: 5 ft 11 in (180 cm)
- Weight: 195 lb (88 kg; 13 st 13 lb)
- Position: Goaltender
- Caught: Left
- Played for: Boston Bruins
- National team: Canada
- NHL draft: 165th overall, 1980; Boston Bruins
- Playing career: 1982–1985

Michael Anthony Moffat (born February 4, 1962) is a Canadian former professional ice hockey goaltender.

== Early life ==
Moffat was born in Galt, Ontario. In 1982, he played for the Canadian national junior team in the 1982 World Junior Championships and was named the best goaltender of the tournament after leading Canada to the gold medal.

== Career ==
Moffat played 18 games for the Boston Bruins of the National Hockey League (NHL) between 1982 and 1984. He also played in the American Hockey League (AHL) for the Baltimore Skipjacks, Hershey Bears and Nova Scotia Oilers in a career that lasted from 1982 and 1985.

Moffat retired from professional hockey and later played in an over-40 charity league. He also worked as an external salesman at Rona, Inc. in Toronto.

== Career statistics ==
=== Regular season and playoffs ===
			Regular season									Playoffs
Season	Team	League	GP	W	L	T	MIN	GA	SO	GAA	SV%	GP	W	L	MIN	GA	SO	GAA	SV%
1979–80	London Canadians	OMJHL	21	7	7	1	968	71	0	4.40	—	—	—	—	—	—	—	—	—
1980–81	London Canadians	OHL	57	33	21	3	3442	211	0	3.68	—	—	—	—	—	—	—	—	—
1981–82	Boston Bruins	NHL	2	2	0	0	120	6	0	3.00	.882	—	—	—	—	—	—	—	—
1981–82	Kingston Canadians	OHL	46	19	21	4	2666	184	1	4.15	—	—	—	—	—	—	—	—	—
1982–83	Boston Bruins	NHL	12	4	5	1	612	46	0	4.51	.817	—	—	—	—	—	—	—	—
1982–83	Baltimore Skipjacks	AHL	17	5	8	3	937	78	0	4.99	—	—	—	—	—	—	—	—	—
1983–84	Boston Bruins	NHL	4	1	1	1	186	15	0	4.84	.815	—	—	—	—	—	—	—	—
1983–84	Hershey Bears	AHL	30	8	13	4	1592	124	0	4.67	—	—	—	—	—	—	—	—	—
1984–85	Nova Scotia Oilers	AHL	1	0	1	1	60	9	0	9.00	—	—	—	—	—	—	—	—	—
1985–86	Wilfrid Laurier University	CIAU	6	5	1	0	360	19	0	3.20	—	—	—	—	—	—	—	—	—
1986–87	Canadian National Team	Intl	6	2	3	1	333	18	0	3.24	—	—	—	—	—	—	—	—	—
NHL totals			18	7	6	2	919	67	0	4.38	.826	—	—	—	—	—	—	—	—

=== International ===
Year	Team	Event	GP	W	L	T	MIN	GA	SO	GAA	SV%
1982	Canada	WJC	4	3	0	1	240	7	1	1.75	—
Junior totals			4	3	0	1	240	7	1	1.75	—

== Awards and honors ==
- All-Star selection, goaltender, 1982 World Junior Championships
