= Steve Bozek =

Canadian ice hockey player (born 1960)

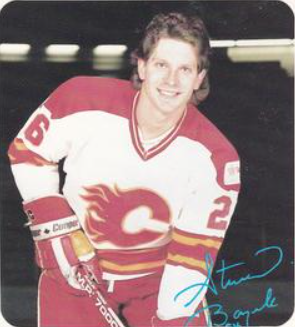
- Born: November 26, 1960 (age 65) Kelowna, British Columbia, Canada
- Height: 5 ft 11 in (180 cm)
- Weight: 180 lb (82 kg; 12 st 12 lb)
- Position: Left wing
- Shot: Left
- Played for: Los Angeles Kings; Calgary Flames; St. Louis Blues; Vancouver Canucks; San Jose Sharks
- National team: Canada
- NHL draft: 52nd overall, 1980; Los Angeles Kings
- Playing career: 1981–1993

Steven Michael Bozek (born November 26, 1960) is a Canadian former professional ice hockey left wing who spent 11 seasons in the NHL with five clubs. He has Slovene roots. Noted for his hard shot, he was a reliable two-way forward and strong penalty killer.

== Playing career ==
Bozek was drafted by the Los Angeles Kings in the 3rd round, 52nd overall in the 1980 NHL entry draft while playing for Northern Michigan University. Bozek was named a CCHA First-Team All-Star twice in his three years at Northern Michigan, leading the CCHA in scoring during the 1980–1981 season. In 1981, he was named a First-Team All-American - the first hockey All-American ever for Northern Michigan - after dominating college hockey with 90 points in just 44 games, and was a finalist for the Hobey Baker Award.

Bozek turned pro after his junior year, breaking straight into the Kings lineup for the 1981–82 season. As a rookie, he received an opportunity to spend a large portion of the season on the famed Triple Crown Line with Marcel Dionne and Dave Taylor due to an injury to Charlie Simmer, and he set a Kings rookie record (since broken) with 33 goals. In the playoffs, he secured a place in Kings lore by scoring the tying goal with 5 seconds left in the famed Miracle on Manchester game against the Edmonton Oilers, which was the greatest playoff comeback in NHL history as Los Angeles rallied from a 5–0 deficit to win 6–5 in overtime.

1982–83 would be a difficult year for Bozek, as he struggled with injuries and the sophomore jinx, finishing with 13 goals and 26 points in 53 games. At the conclusion of the season, he was dealt to the Calgary Flames. Always a primarily offensive player to that point in his career, in Calgary he began to develop the defensive side of his game and became a strong checker and penalty killer. However, his five seasons in Calgary would be blighted by nagging knee problems, and he was only able to play more than 70 games in a season once. His best year as a Flame was 1985–86, as he scored 21 goals and 22 assists for 43 points in 64 games, including a club-leading 4 shorthanded goals. He added 8 points in 14 games in the playoffs as Calgary reached the Stanley Cup finals.

After missing most of the 1987–88 season with a knee injury, Bozek was traded to the St. Louis Blues at the trade deadline along with Brett Hull in a deal for Rob Ramage and Rick Wamsley. Another knee injury limited him to 7 regular season games with the Blues, and he finished the season with just 3 goals and 10 points in 33 games between Calgary and St. Louis.

Bozek's time in St. Louis would be brief, as he was dealt to the Vancouver Canucks in a three-way deal prior to the 1988–89 campaign. He would have a strong bounce-back season in Vancouver, finishing with 17 goals and 35 points, and his defensive play was a factor in Vancouver improving to 3rd in the league defensively from 17th the previous season. He spent two more seasons in Vancouver, recording solid totals of 14 and 15 goals, although as usual he was slowed down by injuries which caused him to miss 40 games over that stretch. Due to his enthusiastic and scrappy style of play, he earned the nickname Steve "Boom-Boom" Bozek, a nickname coined by CKNW commentator Tom Larschied. He was selected to play for Canada at the 1991 World Championships, winning a silver medal.

In 1991, Bozek signed as a free agent with the expansion San Jose Sharks, and was a member of their inaugural team during the 1991–92 season, finishing with 8 goals and 16 points in 58 games. He then played for a season in Italy before retiring in 1993.

Bozek finished his career with totals of 164 goals and 167 assists for 331 points in 641 games, along with 309 penalty minutes. He never played a game in the minor leagues.

After his career was over, he earned an MBA from Harvard Business School.

== Career statistics ==
=== Regular season and playoffs ===
			Regular season					Playoffs
Season	Team	League	GP	G	A	Pts	PIM	GP	G	A	Pts	PIM
1978–79	Northern Michigan University	CCHA	33	12	12	24	21	—	—	—	—	—
1979–80	Northern Michigan University	CCHA	41	42	47	89	32	—	—	—	—	—
1980–81	Northern Michigan University	CCHA	44	35	55	90	46	—	—	—	—	—
1981–82	Los Angeles Kings	NHL	71	33	23	56	68	10	4	1	5	6
1982–83	Los Angeles Kings	NHL	53	13	13	26	14	—	—	—	—	—
1983–84	Calgary Flames	NHL	46	10	10	20	16	10	3	1	4	15
1984–85	Calgary Flames	NHL	54	13	22	35	6	3	1	0	1	4
1985–86	Calgary Flames	NHL	64	21	22	43	24	14	2	6	8	32
1986–87	Calgary Flames	NHL	71	17	18	35	22	4	1	0	1	2
1987–88	Calgary Flames	NHL	26	3	7	10	12	—	—	—	—	—
1987–88	St. Louis Blues	NHL	7	0	0	0	2	7	1	1	2	6
1988–89	Vancouver Canucks	NHL	71	17	18	35	64	7	0	2	2	4
1989–90	Vancouver Canucks	NHL	58	14	9	23	32	—	—	—	—	—
1990–91	Vancouver Canucks	NHL	62	15	17	32	22	3	0	0	0	0
1991–92	San Jose Sharks	NHL	58	8	8	16	27	—	—	—	—	—
1992–93	HC Bolzano	Alpen	17	13	11	24	6	—	—	—	—	—
1992–93	HC Bolzano	ITA	9	4	3	7	8	6	2	2	4	11
1993–94	Olimpija Ljubljana	SLV	1	0	0	0	0	—	—	—	—	—
NHL totals			641	164	167	331	309	58	12	11	23	69

=== International ===
Year	Team	Event	GP	G	A	Pts	PIM
1991	Canada	WC	8	1	1	2	4
Senior totals			8	1	1	2	4

== Awards and honours ==
Award	Year
All-CCHA First Team	1979–80
All-CCHA First Team	1980–81
AHCA West All-American	1980–81
All-NCAA All-Tournament Team	1981
