= Mark Paterson (ice hockey) =

Canadian ice hockey player

- Born: February 22, 1964 (age 61) Ottawa, Ontario, Canada
- Height: 6 ft 1 in (185 cm)
- Weight: 210 lb (95 kg; 15 st 0 lb)
- Position: Defence
- Shot: Left
- Played for: Hartford Whalers
- National team: Canada
- NHL draft: 35th overall, 1982; Hartford Whalers
- Playing career: 1983–1989

Mark Paterson (born February 22, 1964) is a Canadian former professional ice hockey player.

== Early life ==
Paterson was born in Ottawa, Ontario. As a youth, he played in the 1977 Quebec International Pee-Wee Hockey Tournament with a minor ice hockey team from Nepean, Ontario.

== Career ==
Paterson played in 29 National Hockey League games with the Hartford Whalers over parts of four seasons between 1983 and 1985. The rest of his career, which lasted from 1983 to 1989, was spent in different minor leagues.

== Career statistics ==
=== Regular season and playoffs ===
			Regular season					Playoffs
Season	Team	League	GP	G	A	Pts	PIM	GP	G	A	Pts	PIM
1979–80	Nepean Raiders	CJHL	1	0	0	0	0	—	—	—	—	—
1980–81	Nepean Raiders	CJHL	50	6	13	19	98	—	—	—	—	—
1981–82	Ottawa 67s	OHL	64	4	13	17	59	17	1	5	6	40
1982–83	Hartford Whalers	NHL	2	0	0	0	0	—	—	—	—	—
1982–83	Ottawa 67s	OHL	57	7	14	21	140	9	1	4	5	31
1983–84	Hartford Whalers	NHL	9	2	0	2	4	—	—	—	—	—
1983–84	Ottawa 67s	OHL	45	8	16	24	114	13	2	7	9	16
1983–84	Ottawa 67s	M-Cup	—	—	—	—	—	5	0	2	2	8
1984–85	Hartford Whalers	NHL	13	1	3	4	24	—	—	—	—	—
1984–85	Binghamton Whalers	AHL	44	2	18	20	74	8	0	0	0	18
1985–86	Hartford Whalers	NHL	5	0	0	0	5	—	—	—	—	—
1985–86	Binghamton Whalers	AHL	67	2	16	18	121	6	0	0	0	0
1986–87	Moncton Golden Flames	AHL	70	6	21	27	112	3	0	0	0	0
1987–88	Saginaw Hawks	IHL	23	1	5	6	55	8	0	4	4	15
1988–89	Saginaw Hawks	IHL	17	1	3	4	42	—	—	—	—	—
AHL totals			181	10	55	65	307	17	0	0	0	18
NHL totals			29	3	3	6	33	—	—	—	—	—

=== International ===
Year	Team	Event	GP	G	A	Pts	PIM
1984	Canada	WJC	7	0	2	2	10
Junior totals			7	0	2	2	10
