= Adam Creighton (ice hockey) =

Canadian ice hockey player (born 1965)

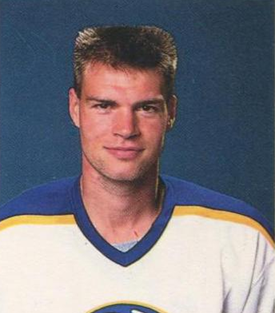
- Born: June 2, 1965 (age 61) Burlington, Ontario, Canada
- Height: 6 ft 5 in (196 cm)
- Weight: 210 lb (95 kg; 15 st 0 lb)
- Position: Centre
- Shot: Left
- Played for: Buffalo Sabres; Chicago Blackhawks; New York Islanders; Tampa Bay Lightning; St. Louis Blues; Augsburger Panther
- NHL draft: 11th overall, 1983; Buffalo Sabres
- Playing career: 1984–1999

Adam Creighton (born June 2, 1965) is a Canadian former professional ice hockey player. He played 708 career National Hockey League (NHL) games after winning the Memorial Cup in 1984 as a member of the Ottawa 67's. Creighton played professionally for the Buffalo Sabres, Chicago Blackhawks, New York Islanders, Tampa Bay Lightning and St. Louis Blues. His father Dave was also a former NHL player.

== Early life ==
Creighton was born on June 2, 1965, in Burlington, Ontario, Canada to parents Dave and Iris. His father played 615 games in the National Hockey League (NHL) before retiring. Creighton was raised alongside his siblings David and Carolyn.

== Playing career ==
=== Amateur ===
Due to his father's hockey career, Creighton moved to various cities before settling in Welland, Ontario. Growing up in Welland, Creighton played within their minor hockey association for the Welland Jr. Canadians and the Welland Birdland Bantam team. Creighton was named the 1981 Royside Easter tournament MVP while playing for the Welland Gillespie Pontlac Midget Majors. He finished his midget career with the Welland Pontlac's and was ranked 39th overall by the Ontario Hockey League's (OHL) Central Scouting bureau. While playing midget hockey, Pittsburgh Penguins scout Ken Schinkel informed Ottawa 67's head coach Brian Kilrea about his skills. He was eventually drafted in the first round, 13th overall, by the Ottawa 67's in the OHL Priority Selection draft. As he was only 15 years old, Creighton had four years of junior hockey eligibility.

Creighton joined the Ottawa 67's organization for the 1981–82 season and enrolled at Canterbury High School. He started the season centering the 67's third line with Doug Stewart and Mike James but played with numerous wingers throughout the season. Kilrea received criticism from 67's fans for drafting Creighton in the first round due to his poor skating ability. While he struggled to score goals through the first half of the season, Creighton finished with 42 points. Creighton returned to the 67's for the 1982–83 season, and quickly scored nine goals in October. Creighton continued to improve offensively from his rookie season and collected 25 goals and 22 assists through 37 games. By the end of January, he was ranked second among all OHL draft-eligible players by the NHL Central Scouting Bureau. While he was praised for his scoring, scouts were concerned about his skating abilities. After finishing the season with 90 points, he was drafted in the first round, 11th overall, by the Buffalo Sabres in the 1983 NHL entry draft.

Following the draft, Creighton spent a week at the 67's training camp before joining the Sabres' training camp. He played a few of their exhibition contests before being returned to the 67's. Due to his young age, Creighton had two more years of junior eligibility left before ageing out of the OHL. While the Sabres returned him to the 67's for the 1983–84 season, he was still able to be called up to the NHL. Upon rejoining the OHL, Creighton scored six goals through his first five games of the season with the 67's. He was called up by the Sabres in early November but was returned to the OHL without making his debut. By mid-December, Creighton had accumulated 21 goals and 23 assists through 25 games. He was recalled again to the NHL level on December 16, 1983. Creighton scored his first career NHL goal in his NHL debut on December 18, 1983, against the Vancouver Canucks. He scored his second NHL goal the following game and recorded an assist. Creighton scored four points through seven games with the Sabress before being returned to the OHL. Upon rejoining the 67's, Creighton centered a line with Gary Roberts and Don McLaren. They combined for 16 points in 10 minutes in a game against the Toronto Marlboros on February 24, 1984. Despite missing numerous games while with the Sabres, Creighton finished the regular season third on the team with 42 goals and a career-high 49 assists for 91 points.

Creighton helped the 67's advance through the 1984 OHL playoffs and clinch the J. Ross Robertson Cup over the Kitchener Rangers. As such, they qualified for the 1984 Memorial Cup. He finished the OHL playoffs second on the team in scoring with 16 goals and 12 assists for 28 points. However, as the Rangers were hosting the 1984 Memorial Cup, they too advanced. Creighton and the 67s faced the Rangers in the Memorial Cup Finals, where they beat them 7-2 to clinch their first championship title. He finished the Memorial Cup with a team-leading five goals and seven assists and received the Stafford Smythe Memorial Trophy as the CHL Memorial Cup Most Valuable Player.

=== Professional ===
Creighton scored his second career NHL hat-trick on February 19, 1989, against the Montreal Canadiens. His efforts helped the Blackhawks tie for second place in the Norris Division.

Creighton was suspended for the first five games of the 1990–91 season after swinging his stick during an exhibition game.

== Post-retirement ==
Following his retirement, Creighton joined the Boston Bruins organization as a part-time amateur scout. By 2007, he had been promoted to a full-time pro scout. When the Bruins won the 2011 Stanley Cup Finals, Creighton brought the Stanley Cup to Port Colborne. Creighton also turned to golfing and competed in the Ontario Senior Men’s Championship.

== Personal life ==
Creighton and his wife Linda have three children together.

== Career statistics ==
=== Regular season and playoffs ===
			Regular season					Playoffs
Season	Team	League	GP	G	A	Pts	PIM	GP	G	A	Pts	PIM
1981–82	Ottawa 67's	OHL	60	15	27	42	73	17	7	1	8	40
1982–83	Ottawa 67's	OHL	68	44	46	90	88	9	0	2	2	12
1983–84	Ottawa 67's	OHL	56	42	49	91	79	13	16	11	27	28
1983–84	Buffalo Sabres	NHL	7	2	2	4	4	—	—	—	—	—
1984–85	Ottawa 67's	OHL	10	4	14	18	23	5	6	2	8	11
1984–85	Buffalo Sabres	NHL	30	2	8	10	33	—	—	—	—	—
1984–85	Rochester Americans	AHL	6	5	3	8	2	5	2	1	3	20
1985–86	Rochester Americans	AHL	32	17	21	38	27	—	—	—	—	—
1985–86	Buffalo Sabres	NHL	19	1	1	2	2	—	—	—	—	—
1986–87	Buffalo Sabres	NHL	56	18	22	40	26	—	—	—	—	—
1987–88	Buffalo Sabres	NHL	36	10	17	27	87	—	—	—	—	—
1988–89	Buffalo Sabres	NHL	24	7	10	17	44	—	—	—	—	—
1988–89	Chicago Blackhawks	NHL	43	15	14	29	92	15	5	6	11	44
1989–90	Chicago Blackhawks	NHL	80	34	36	70	224	20	3	6	9	59
1990–91	Chicago Blackhawks	NHL	72	22	29	51	135	6	0	1	1	10
1991–92	Chicago Blackhawks	NHL	11	6	6	12	16	—	—	—	—	—
1991–92	New York Islanders	NHL	66	15	9	24	102	—	—	—	—	—
1992–93	Tampa Bay Lightning	NHL	83	19	20	39	110	—	—	—	—	—
1993–94	Tampa Bay Lightning	NHL	53	10	10	20	37	—	—	—	—	—
1994–95	St. Louis Blues	NHL	48	14	20	34	74	7	2	0	2	16
1995–96	St. Louis Blues	NHL	61	11	10	21	78	13	1	1	2	8
1996–97	Indianapolis Ice	IHL	6	1	7	8	11	—	—	—	—	—
1996–97	Chicago Blackhawks	NHL	19	1	2	3	13	—	—	—	—	—
1997–98	Augsburger Panther	DEL	22	10	9	19	45	—	—	—	—	—
1998–99	Augsburger Panther	DEL	10	0	2	2	30	—	—	—	—	—
NHL totals			708	187	216	403	1,077	61	11	14	25	137

Adam Creighton
Medal record

Representing Canada

Ice hockey

World Junior Championships
Gold medal – first place	1985 Helsinki	

=== International ===
Year	Team	Comp	GP	G	A	Pts	PIM
1985	Canada	WJC	7	8	4	12	4
Junior int'l totals			7	8	4	12	4

Preceded by Normand Lacombe	Buffalo Sabres first-round draft pick 1983	Succeeded by Mikael Andersson
