= Brad Shaw =

Canadian ice hockey player and coach (born 1964)

- Born: April 28, 1964 (age 62) Cambridge, Ontario, Canada
- Height: 6 ft 0 in (183 cm)
- Weight: 190 lb (86 kg; 13 st 8 lb)
- Position: Defence
- Shot: Right
- Played for: Hartford Whalers; Ottawa Senators; Washington Capitals; St. Louis Blues
- Coached for: New York Islanders; Philadelphia Flyers
- National team: Canada
- NHL draft: 86th overall, 1982; Detroit Red Wings
- Playing career: 1984–1999
- Coaching career: 1995–present

Bradley William Shaw (born April 28, 1964) is a Canadian professional ice hockey coach and former player who is the assistant coach for the New Jersey Devils of the National Hockey League (NHL). He was selected by the Detroit Red Wings of the National Hockey League (NHL) in the fifth round, 86th overall, in the 1982 NHL entry draft. He has played for the Hartford Whalers, Ottawa Senators, Washington Capitals and St. Louis Blues in the NHL. He was a member of the 1989–90 NHL All-Rookie Team and twice won the Eddie Shore Award as the American Hockey League's best defenceman. He won the Turner Cup with the Detroit Vipers of the International Hockey League and the J. Ross Robertson Cup and Memorial Cup as a member of the Ottawa 67's of the Ontario Hockey League (OHL).

== Playing career ==
=== Junior ===
Shaw joined the Ottawa 67's of the Ontario Hockey League (OHL) at the age of 17 in 1981–82. In his rookie season, Shaw led all 67's defencemen with 72 points, scoring 13 goals and adding 59 assists in 68 games, helping Ottawa into the playoffs. In 17 playoff games, Shaw scored a goal and 14 points, as the 67's were swept by the Kitchener Rangers in the OHL finals. In the 1982–83 season Shaw saw his offensive production improve in his second season with the 67's, scoring 12 goals and 78 points in 63 games. In nine playoff games, Shaw scored two goals and 11 points, as the 67's lost to the Oshawa Generals in the Leyden Division finals.

In 1983–84, Shaw once again improved his offense, scoring 11 goals and 82 points in 68 games, helping the 67's to have the best record in the Leyden Division that season. In the playoffs, Shaw led the 67's in scoring, earning two goals and a team high 29 points in 13 games, as Ottawa won the J. Ross Robertson Cup over the Kitchener Rangers, and earned a berth in the 1984 Memorial Cup. At the Memorial Cup, Shaw had a goal and five points in five games, as the 67's won the championship, defeating the host Kitchener Rangers 7–2 in the final game at the Kitchener Memorial Auditorium. Shaw was named to the 1983–84 OHL first all-star team, and won the Max Kaminsky Trophy, given to the most outstanding defenceman in the OHL.

=== Professional career ===
==== Hartford Whalers ====
Shaw was originally drafted by the Detroit Red Wings in the fifth round, 86th overall, in the 1982 NHL entry draft. However, in April 1984, Red Wings general manager Jimmy Devellano told Shaw that the Red Wings would not sign him. His rights were traded to the Hartford Whalers for the Whalers' eighth round draft pick in the 1984 NHL entry draft on May 29, 1984.

Shaw joined the Whalers in for the 1984–85 season. He was assigned first to the Binghamton Whalers of the American Hockey League (AHL). However, Binghamton cut Shaw too and he was reassigned to the Salt Lake Golden Eagles of the International Hockey League (IHL). Shaw refused assignment and left the team, hoping to play at Wilfrid Laurier University. Hartford threatened to sue Shaw, and forced him to join Salt Lake. In 44 games with the Golden Eagles, Shaw had three goals and 32 points. He finished the season with Binghamton, where in 24 games, Shaw had a goal and 11 points. In eight playoff games with Binghamton, Shaw finished with a goal and nine points.

He spent the majority of the 1985–86 in Binghamton, where in 64 games, Shaw scored 10 goals and 54 points. In five playoff games, Shaw earned two assists. Shaw debuted with the Hartford Whalers in the 1985–86 NHL season. Shaw played in his first NHL game on February 18, 1986, a 5–4 victory over the Vancouver Canucks. Shaw recorded his first NHL point with an assist on Sylvain Turgeon's goal in an 8–2 loss to the St. Louis Blues on February 23. Overall, he appeared in eight games, where he recorded two assists.

In the 1986–87 season, Shaw struggled offensively compared to previous season, as in 77 games with Binghamton, he scored nine goals and 39 points, although, he found his offensive touch in the playoffs, finishing with a goal and nine points in 12 games. Shaw won the Eddie Shore Award as the AHL's best defenceman and was named to the AHL's First All-Star Team. Shaw was recalled by Hartford and made his 1986–87 NHL season debut on February 6, 1987, in a 5–2 win over the Washington Capitals. He played in one more NHL game that season earning no points. The following season, Shaw returned to Binghamton. He had a solid offensive season, scoring 12 goals and 62 points in 73 games. In four playoff games, Shaw led Binghamton in scoring with five points, all assists. He was named an AHL First Team All-Star again. Shaw again saw very limited action with Hartford in 1987–88, making his sole appearance in a 5–4 victory over the Pittsburgh Penguins on January 9, 1988, going pointless.

Shaw began the 1988–89 season playing with HC Varese in Serie A in Italy, where in 35 games, he scored 10 goals and 40 points. In 11 playoff games, Shaw had four goals and 12 points with Varese. HC Varese won its second championship that season on March 4, 1989. Shaw returned to the Whalers organization on March 7, at the end of the 1988–89 NHL season, where he appeared in three games. On March 29, 1989, Shaw scored his first career NHL goal against Vincent Riendeau of the St. Louis Blues in a 4–0 Whalers victory, his only point with the Whalers that season. Shaw made his playoffs debut on April 6, 1989, against the Montreal Canadiens and appeared in three Stanley Cup playoff games for the Whalers. On April 8, 1989, he scored his first career playoff goal and point, a game-tying goal to send the game to overtime against Brian Hayward of the Montreal Canadiens in a 5–4 loss. Shaw signed a one-year contract extension with the Whalers in May 1989 with an additional one-year option.

Shaw saw regular ice time with Hartford beginning in the 1989–90 season. He appeared in 64 games, scoring three goals and 35 points. On October 26, 1989, Shaw recorded four assists in a 7–3 victory against the New Jersey Devils. In the 1990 Stanley Cup playoffs, Shaw led the Whalers in scoring, earning two goals and seven points in seven games, as the Whalers lost a thrilling first round series against the Boston Bruins. In the third game of the series on April 9, 1990, Shaw scored a goal and added three assists for a four-point game in a 5–3 Hartford win. Shaw was named to the NHL All-Rookie Team at the end of the season, and named the Whalers best defenceman.

In 1990–91, Shaw played in 72 games with Hartford, scoring four goals and 32 points to lead the Whalers defense in scoring. In six playoff games, Shaw recorded a goal and three points, as Hartford lost to the Boston Bruins in the Adams Division semi-finals. In 62 games with the Whalers in 1991–92, Shaw scored three goals and 25 points, hampered by a wrist injury that required surgery in the offseason and uncomfortable with the Whalers' new coach Jimmy Roberts' strategy. Shaw saw action in only three of the Whalers' seven playoff games, earning an assist as the Whalers lost to the Montreal Canadiens in the opening playoff round.

On June 13, 1992, the Whalers new general manager, Brian Burke, traded Shaw to the New Jersey Devils for future considerations, as the Whalers did not want to lose the defenceman for nothing. Shaw's stay with the Devils was short-lived, as five days later he was left unprotected in 1992 NHL expansion draft and was chosen by the Ottawa Senators.

==== Ottawa Senators ====
Shaw was selected by the Ottawa Senators as part of a secret deal whereby if Ottawa did not select Viacheslav Fetisov of the New Jersey Devils, but another player, then New Jersey would send Ottawa a young player to complete the transaction. Shaw was named an alternate captain for the Senators. Shaw was on the ice for the opening faceoff in Ottawa's first game in their inaugural season in 1992–93. Shaw played in 81 games with the Senators, scoring seven goals and 41 points. On November 5, 1992, he had a multi-point game against the Calgary Flames, then again against the San Jose Sharks on January 10, 1993.

Shaw was named a co-captain of the Senators with Mark Lamb to begin 1993–94, a position they both held until March when Lamb was traded to the Philadelphia Flyers. Gord Dineen was named captain as his (and Lamb's) replacement for the rest of that season. In 66 games, Shaw had four goals and 23 points. In the lockout-shortened 1994–95 season, Shaw appeared in only two games with the Senators, getting no points. He finished the year with the Atlanta Knights of the IHL, where in 26 games, he had a goal and 19 points. In five playoff games with Atlanta, Shaw had seven points.

==== Detroit Vipers ====
Shaw joined the Detroit Vipers of the IHL as a player and an assistant coach to head coach Rick Dudley. In his first season with the club in 1995–96, Shaw had seven goals and 61 points in 79 games. In eight playoff games, Shaw had two goals and five points, as Detroit lost to the Orlando Solar Bears. Shaw returned as a player-assistant coach with the Vipers in 1996–97, as Steve Ludzik was named the new head coach of the team. In 59 games, Shaw had six goals and 38 points. In 21 playoff games, Shaw had two goals and 11 points as the Vipers defeated the Long Beach Ice Dogs to win the Turner Cup. In 1997–98 he played in 64 games, scoring two goals and 35 points. He was on the ice for Gordie Howe's last shift in professional hockey on October 3, 1997. In the playoffs, Shaw had a goal and 12 points in 23 games, as the Vipers lost to the Chicago Wolves in seven games in the Turner Cup final.

In 1998–99, Shaw began the season with the Vipers, where he scored 10 goals and 45 points in 61 games. On March 8, 1999, Shaw signed an NHL contract with the Ottawa Senators, as the Senators sought out defensive depth. Shaw was placed on waivers in order to return to Detroit, and was claimed by the Washington Capitals on March 9, who were also dealing with defensive depth issues.

==== Washington Capitals ====
Shaw returned to the NHL with the Washington Capitals in 1998–99, appearing in four games with the club, recording no points. He made his Capitals debut on March 10 versus the Florida Panthers and was on the ice for the Panthers' opening goal of the game in a 2–1 loss. His stay with the Capitals was short, as on March 18, 1999, Shaw and the Capitals' eighth round draft pick in the 1999 NHL entry draft were traded to the St. Louis Blues for the Blues sixth round draft pick in the 1999 NHL entry draft.

==== St. Louis Blues ====
Shaw finished the 1998–99 season with the St. Louis Blues, earning no points in 12 games. He made his Blues debut in a 3–2 loss to his former team, the Ottawa Senators, on March 20, 1999. Shaw saw action in four playoff games, going pointless, as the Blues lost to the Dallas Stars in the second round of the 1999 Stanley Cup playoffs. Shaw announced his retirement from playing hockey following the season.

== International play ==
Medal record

Men's ice hockey

Representing Canada

World Junior Championships
Bronze medal – third place	1983 Soviet Union	

Shaw represented Canada at the 1983 World Junior Ice Hockey Championships in Leningrad, Soviet Union. He played in 7 games, had one goal and two points as the team finished third in the tournament, winning the bronze medal. Shaw was one of only three players returning for Canada at the 1984 World Junior Ice Hockey Championships in Sweden. Shaw played in 7 games and had no goals and two points. Canada finished fourth in the tournament. He also played four games for Team Canada at the 1988 Izvestia Cup, scoring one goal.

== Coaching career ==
=== Tampa Bay Lightning ===
Shaw was named an assistant coach of the Tampa Bay Lightning for the 1999–2000 season, working under head coach Steve Ludzik. Shaw left after only one season.

=== Detroit Vipers ===
Shaw joined the Detroit Vipers of the IHL as head coach of the team for the 2000–01 season on a two-year contract. In his only season with the team, Detroit struggled to a 23–53–6 record, missing the playoffs. The league folded after the season.

=== Springfield Falcons ===
Shaw joined the Springfield Falcons of the AHL as an assistant coach, working under head coach Marc Potvin.

=== Cincinnati Mighty Ducks ===
Shaw was named head coach of the Cincinnati Mighty Ducks of the AHL for the 2002–03 season, replacing Mike Babcock, who was promoted to the Mighty Ducks of Anaheim. In his first season with the Mighty Ducks, the club struggled to a 26–35–13–6 record, failing to make the post-season.

Shaw returned to the team for the 2003–04 season, as Cincinnati struggled to a 29–37–13–1 record. The Mighty Ducks defeated the Houston Aeros in the qualifying round, defeating the Aeros two games to none, to earn a playoff berth. In the first round of the Calder Cup playoffs, the Mighty Ducks were defeated by the Milwaukee Admirals four games to three. Cincinnati improved during the 2004–05 season, as the team finished the season with a 44–31–1-4 record, making the playoffs. In the post-season, the Mighty Ducks got their revenge against the Milwaukee Admirals, defeating them in the first round. The Mighty Ducks lost to the Chicago Wolves in the second round.

=== New York Islanders ===
Shaw joined the New York Islanders of the NHL as an assistant coach under Steve Stirling for the 2005–06 season. After the Islanders struggled to an 18–22–2 record to start the season, the club fired Stirling, and named Shaw his replacement for the remainder of the season on January 12, 2006. Shaw won his first career game as a head coach, as the Islanders defeated the Calgary Flames 3–2 that night with Miroslav Šatan and Trent Hunter both having multi-point games. Under Shaw, the Islanders posted an 18–18–4 record, and failed to qualify for the post-season. Shaw was not retained by the Islanders' new head coach, Ted Nolan.

=== St. Louis Blues ===
Shaw joined the St. Louis Blues in 2006–07 as an assistant coach under Mike Kitchen. Kitchen was replaced shortly into the season by Andy Murray, however, Shaw remained with the team. Shaw remained with St. Louis for 10 years, as an assistant coach and associated coach under Andy Murray, Davis Payne and Ken Hitchcock. He was credited with developing defencemen Alex Pietrangelo and Kevin Shattenkirk.

=== Columbus Blue Jackets ===
Shaw joined John Tortorella's staff with the Columbus Blue Jackets in June 2016, replacing Craig Hartsburg, who retired following the 2015–16 season.

=== Vancouver Canucks ===
Shaw was announced as an assistant coach of the Vancouver Canucks in June 2021, replacing Newell Brown.

=== Philadelphia Flyers ===
Shaw was named an associate coach of the Philadelphia Flyers in July 2022, reuniting with John Tortorella. On March 12, 2024, Shaw briefly took over as head coach of the Flyers while Tortorella served a two-game suspension, earning his first win that night in a 3–2 victory over the San Jose Sharks. On March 27, 2025, Shaw was named interim head coach of the Flyers following Tortorella's dismissal. He marked his debut as the Flyers' head coach on March 28, notching his first win of the season in a 6–4 victory over the Montreal Canadiens. Under Shaw, the team had a record of 5–3–1 to close out the season.

=== New Jersey Devils ===
After the 2024–25 season it was reported that Shaw would not return to the Flyers, with Flyers general manager Daniel Brière clarifying that Shaw himself had not wanted to participate in the process to see if he was going to be part of incoming head coach Rick Tocchet's bench staff. On May 27, 2025, he was named assistant coach of the New Jersey Devils under head coach Sheldon Keefe.

== Personal life ==
Shaw's wife, Mary, is an author, and writer of the popular children's book series Brady Brady, named after their son, Brady, who also plays ice hockey.

== Career statistics ==
=== Regular season and playoffs ===
			Regular season					Playoffs
Season	Team	League	GP	G	A	Pts	PIM	GP	G	A	Pts	PIM
1980–81	Kitchener Greenshirts	OMHA	62	14	58	72	14	—	—	—	—	—
1981–82	Ottawa 67's	OHL	68	13	59	72	24	15	1	13	14	4
1982–83	Ottawa 67's	OHL	63	12	66	78	24	9	2	9	11	4
1983–84	Ottawa 67's	OHL	68	11	71	82	75	13	2	27	29	9
1983–84	Ottawa 67's	M-Cup	—	—	—	—	—	5	1	4	5	2
1984–85	Binghamton Whalers	AHL	24	1	10	11	4	8	1	8	9	6
1984–85	Salt Lake Golden Eagles	IHL	44	3	29	32	25	—	—	—	—	—
1985–86	Hartford Whalers	NHL	8	0	2	2	4	—	—	—	—	—
1985–86	Binghamton Whalers	AHL	64	10	44	54	33	5	0	2	2	6
1986–87	Hartford Whalers	NHL	2	0	0	0	0	—	—	—	—	—
1986–87	Binghamton Whalers	AHL	77	9	30	39	43	12	1	8	9	2
1987–88	Hartford Whalers	NHL	1	0	0	0	0	—	—	—	—	—
1987–88	Binghamton Whalers	AHL	73	12	50	62	50	4	0	5	5	4
1988–89	AS Varese	Serie A	35	10	30	40	44	11	4	8	12	13
1988–89	Canada	Intl	4	1	0	1	2	—	—	—	—	—
1988–89	Hartford Whalers	NHL	3	1	0	1	0	3	1	0	1	0
1989–90	Hartford Whalers	NHL	64	3	32	35	30	7	2	5	7	0
1990–91	Hartford Whalers	NHL	72	4	28	32	29	6	1	2	3	2
1991–92	Hartford Whalers	NHL	62	3	22	25	44	3	0	1	1	4
1992–93	Ottawa Senators	NHL	81	7	34	41	34	—	—	—	—	—
1993–94	Ottawa Senators	NHL	66	4	19	23	59	—	—	—	—	—
1994–95	Ottawa Senators	NHL	2	0	0	0	0	—	—	—	—	—
1994–95	Atlanta Knights	IHL	26	1	18	19	17	5	3	4	7	9
1995–96	Detroit Vipers	IHL	79	7	54	61	46	8	2	3	5	8
1996–97	Detroit Vipers	IHL	59	6	32	38	30	21	2	9	11	10
1997–98	Detroit Vipers	IHL	64	2	33	35	47	23	1	11	12	30
1998–99	Detroit Vipers	IHL	61	10	35	45	44	—	—	—	—	—
1998–99	Washington Capitals	NHL	4	0	0	0	4	—	—	—	—	—
1998–99	St. Louis Blues	NHL	12	0	0	0	4	4	0	0	0	0
AHL totals			238	32	134	166	130	29	2	23	25	18
IHL totals			333	29	201	230	209	57	8	27	35	57
NHL totals			377	22	137	159	208	23	4	8	12	6

=== International ===
Year	Team	Event	GP	G	A	Pts	PIM
1983	Canada	WJC	7	1	1	2	2
1984	Canada	WJC	7	0	2	2	0
Junior totals			14	1	3	4	2

== Head coaching record ==
Team	Year	Regular season						Postseason			
Team	Year	G	W	L	OTL	Pts	Finish	W	L	Win %	Result
NYI	2005–06*	40	18	18	4	(40)	4th in Atlantic	—	—	—	Missed playoffs
PHI	2024–25*	9	5	3	1	(11)	8th in Metropolitan	—	—	—	Missed playoffs
Total		49	23	21	5			—	—	—	

* – mid-season replacement

== Sources ==
- Chaimovitch, Jason, ed. (2023). 2023–2024 American Hockey League Official Guide & Record Book. Springfield, Massachusetts: American Hockey League. OCLC 22147888.
- Codagnone, Brian (2007). The Hartford Whalers. Charleston, South Carolina: Arcadia Publishing. ISBN 978-0-7385-5501-0.
- Laroche, Stephen (2014). Changing the Game: A History of NHL Expansion. Toronto: ECW Press. ISBN 978-1-77041-079-4.
- MacGregor, Roy (1993). Road Games: A Year in the Life of the NHL. Toronto: MacFarlane Walter & Ross. ISBN 0-921912-70-6.
- Podnieks, Andrew (1998). Red, White, and Gold: Canada at the World Junior Championships 1974–1999. Toronto: ECW Press. ISBN 1-55022-382-8.

Preceded by Laurie Boschman	Ottawa Senators captain 1993–94 with Mark Lamb	Succeeded by Gord Dineen
Preceded by Steve Stirling	Head coach of the New York Islanders (interim); 2006	Succeeded by Ted Nolan
Preceded by John Tortorella	Head coach of the Philadelphia Flyers (interim); 2025	Succeeded by Rick Tocchet
