= Brian Wilks =

Canadian ice hockey player

- Born: February 27, 1966 (age 60) Toronto, Ontario, Canada
- Height: 5 ft 11 in (180 cm)
- Weight: 180 lb (82 kg; 12 st 12 lb)
- Position: Centre
- Shot: Right
- Played for: Los Angeles Kings
- NHL draft: 24th overall, 1984; Los Angeles Kings
- Playing career: 1984–1990
Medal record
Ice hockey
Representing Canada
Maccabiah Games
Gold medal – first place	1997 Israel	Ice hockey

Brian Wilks (born February 27, 1966) is a Canadian former professional hockey player who played 48 games for the Los Angeles Kings in the National Hockey League between 1985 and 1988. The rest of his career, which lasted from 1985 to 1990, was spent in the minor leagues.

== Biography ==
Wilks was born in Toronto, Ontario. As a youth, he played in the 1979 Quebec International Pee-Wee Hockey Tournament with the Toronto Shopsy's minor ice hockey team. He attended Carleton University 1990-93, majoring in psychology.

He played for the Kitchener Rangers of the Ontario Hockey League from 1982 to 1984.

He was drafted in 1984, 24th overall, by the Los Angeles Kings. He led the Kings in preseason scoring in 1984-85. He made his NHL debut later that season. He played with the Kings until he was traded to the Edmonton Oilers on March 7, 1989. He never played in the NHL again, and finished his career in the American Hockey League in 1990.

He played for Team Canada in the 1997 Maccabiah Games in Israel, winning a gold medal.

== Career statistics ==
=== Regular season and playoffs ===
			Regular season					Playoffs
Season	Team	League	GP	G	A	Pts	PIM	GP	G	A	Pts	PIM
1980–81	Markham Waxers	OPJAHL	2	0	1	1	0	—	—	—	—	—
1981–82	Toronto Marlboros U18	U18	36	40	48	88	22	—	—	—	—	—
1982–83	Kitchener Rangers	OHL	69	6	17	23	25	1	0	0	0	0
1983–84	Kitchener Rangers	OHL	64	21	54	75	36	16	6	14	20	9
1983–84	Kitchener Rangers	M-Cup	—	—	—	—	—	4	6	2	8	0
1984–85	Kitchener Rangers	OHL	58	30	63	93	52	4	2	4	6	2
1984–85	Los Angeles Kings	NHL	2	0	0	0	0	—	—	—	—	—
1985–86	Los Angeles Kings	NHL	43	4	8	12	25	—	—	—	—	—
1986–87	Los Angeles Kings	NHL	1	0	0	0	0	—	—	—	—	—
1986–87	New Haven Nighthawks	AHL	43	16	20	36	23	7	1	3	4	7
1987–88	New Haven Nighthawks	AHL	18	4	8	12	26	—	—	—	—	—
1988–89	New Haven Nighthawks	AHL	44	15	19	34	48	—	—	—	—	—
1988–89	Cape Breton Oilers	AHL	12	4	11	15	27	—	—	—	—	—
1989–90	Cape Breton Oilers	AHL	53	13	20	33	85	—	—	—	—	—
1989–90	Muskegon Lumberjacks	IHL	15	6	11	17	10	15	7	10	17	41
AHL totals			170	52	78	130	209	7	1	3	4	7
NHL totals			46	4	8	12	25	—	—	—	—	—

== See also ==
- List of select Jewish ice hockey players
