= 1980–81 OHL season =

First season of Ontario Hockey League

The 1980–81 OHL season was the first season of the newly established Ontario Hockey League, renaming itself from the Ontario Major Junior Hockey League. The OMJHL formally severed ties with the Ontario Hockey Association over the summer, and affiliated with the Canadian Amateur Hockey Association. The OHL inaugurated the Jack Ferguson Award for the first overall draft pick in the OHL entry draft. Twelve teams each played 68 games. The Kitchener Rangers won the J. Ross Robertson Cup, defeating the Sault Ste. Marie Greyhounds.

== Regular season ==
=== Final standings ===
Note: GP = Games played; W = Wins; L = Losses; T = Ties; GF = Goals for; GA = Goals against; PTS = Points; x = clinched playoff berth; y = clinched first round bye; z = clinched division title & first round bye

=== Leyden Division ===
Rank	Team	GP	W	L	T	PTS	GF	GA
1	z-Sault Ste. Marie Greyhounds	68	47	19	2	96	412	290
2	y-Ottawa 67's	68	45	20	3	93	360	254
3	y-Kingston Canadians	68	39	26	3	81	334	273
4	x-Oshawa Generals	68	35	30	3	73	321	352
5	x-Peterborough Petes	68	29	36	3	61	287	290
6	Sudbury Wolves	68	20	45	3	43	284	380

=== Emms Division ===
Rank	Team	GP	W	L	T	PTS	GF	GA
1	z-Kitchener Rangers	68	34	33	1	69	321	320
2	y-Brantford Alexanders	68	34	34	0	68	350	354
3	y-Windsor Spitfires	68	33	33	2	68	322	337
4	x-Niagara Falls Flyers	68	30	36	2	62	354	359
5	x-Toronto Marlboros	68	31	37	0	62	298	336
6	London Knights	68	20	48	0	40	300	388

=== Scoring leaders ===
Player	Team	GP	G	A	Pts	PIM
John Goodwin	Sault Ste. Marie Greyhounds	68	56	110	166	42
Ernie Godden	Windsor Spitfires	68	87	66	153	185
Bernie Nicholls	Kingston Canadians	65	63	89	152	109
Tony Tanti	Oshawa Generals	67	81	69	150	197
Steve Ludzik	Niagara Falls Flyers	58	50	92	142	108
Scott Howson	Kingston Canadians	66	57	83	140	53
Steve Larmer	Niagara Falls Flyers	61	55	78	133	73
Steve Gatzos	Sault Ste. Marie Greyhounds	68	78	50	128	114
Randy Cunneyworth	Ottawa 67's	67	54	74	128	240
Doug Shedden	Windsor Spitfires	66	51	72	123	78

== Playoffs ==
Division quarter-finals
L4	Oshawa	3
L5	Peterborough	2
E4	Niagara Falls	3
E5	Toronto	2

Division semi-finals
L1	Sault Ste. Marie	8
L4	Oshawa	4
L2	Ottawa	5
L3	Kingston	9
E1	Kitchener	9
E4	Niagara Falls	5
E2	Brantford	4
E3	Windsor	8

Division finals
L1	Sault Ste. Marie	9
L3	Kingston	5
E1	Kitchener	9
E3	Windsor	1

J. Ross Robertson Cup
L1	Sault Ste. Marie	3
E1	Kitchener	9

=== Division quarter-finals ===
==== Leyden Division ====
===== (4) Oshawa Generals vs. (5) Peterborough Petes =====
March 17	Peterborough Petes	2 – 5	Oshawa Generals	Oshawa Civic Auditorium

March 19	Oshawa Generals	3 – 4	OT	Peterborough Petes	Peterborough Memorial Centre

March 22	Peterborough Petes	2 – 5	Oshawa Generals	Oshawa Civic Auditorium

March 23	Oshawa Generals	3 – 4	Peterborough Petes	Peterborough Memorial Centre

March 24	Peterborough Petes	2 – 6	Oshawa Generals	Oshawa Civic Auditorium

Oshawa wins series 3 – 2

==== Emms Division ====
===== (4) Niagara Falls Flyers vs. (5) Toronto Marlboros =====
March 17	Toronto Marlboros	4 – 3	Niagara Falls Flyers	Niagara Falls Memorial Arena

March 19	Niagara Falls Flyers	4 – 7	Toronto Marlboros	Maple Leaf Gardens

March 20	Toronto Marlboros	2 – 7	Niagara Falls Flyers	Niagara Falls Memorial Arena

March 22	Niagara Falls Flyers	9 – 5	Toronto Marlboros	Maple Leaf Gardens

March 24	Toronto Marlboros	4 – 5	OT	Niagara Falls Flyers	Niagara Falls Memorial Arena

Niagara Falls wins series 3 – 2

=== Division semi-finals ===
==== Leyden Division ====
===== (1) Sault Ste. Marie Greyhounds vs. (4) Oshawa Generals =====
March 26	Oshawa Generals	2 – 10	Sault Ste. Marie Greyhounds	Sault Memorial Gardens

March 27	Oshawa Generals	6 – 8	Sault Ste. Marie Greyhounds	Sault Memorial Gardens

March 29	Sault Ste. Marie Greyhounds	6 – 4	Oshawa Generals	Oshawa Civic Auditorium

March 30	Sault Ste. Marie Greyhounds	5 – 9	Oshawa Generals	Oshawa Civic Auditorium

April 1	Oshawa Generals	5 – 3	Sault Ste. Marie Greyhounds	Sault Memorial Gardens

April 3	Sault Ste. Marie Greyhounds	5 – 4	Oshawa Generals	Oshawa Civic Auditorium

Sault Ste. Marie wins series 8 – 4

===== (2) Ottawa 67's vs. (3) Kingston Canadians =====
March 20	Kingston Canadians	5 – 4	Ottawa 67's	Ottawa Civic Centre

March 22	Ottawa 67's	4 – 5	Kingston Canadians	Kingston Memorial Centre

March 24	Kingston Canadians	6 – 6	Ottawa 67's	Ottawa Civic Centre

March 27	Ottawa 67's	9 – 1	Kingston Canadians	Kingston Memorial Centre

March 29	Kingston Canadians	2 – 5	Ottawa 67's	Ottawa Civic Centre

March 31	Ottawa 67's	2 – 6	Kingston Canadians	Kingston Memorial Centre

April 3	Kingston Canadians	3 – 2	Ottawa 67's	Ottawa Civic Centre

Kingston wins series 9 – 5

==== Emms Division ====
===== (1) Kitchener Rangers vs. (4) Niagara Falls Flyers =====
March 27	Niagara Falls Flyers	2 – 5	Kitchener Rangers	Kitchener Memorial Auditorium

March 29	Kitchener Rangers	5 – 2	Niagara Falls Flyers	Niagara Falls Memorial Arena

March 30	Niagara Falls Flyers	5 – 0	Kitchener Rangers	Kitchener Memorial Auditorium

March 31	Kitchener Rangers	3 – 3	Niagara Falls Flyers	Niagara Falls Memorial Arena

April 2	Niagara Falls Flyers	7 – 8	Kitchener Rangers	Kitchener Memorial Auditorium

April 3	Kitchener Rangers	1 – 5	Niagara Falls Flyers	Niagara Falls Memorial Arena

April 5	Niagara Falls Flyers	4 – 5	Kitchener Rangers	Kitchener Memorial Auditorium

Kitchener wins series 9 – 5

===== (2) Brantford Alexanders vs. (3) Windsor Spitfires =====
March 20	Windsor Spitfires	2 – 4	Brantford Alexanders	Brantford Civic Centre

March 22	Brantford Alexanders	7 – 7	Windsor Spitfires	Windsor Arena

March 24	Windsor Spitfires	8 – 8	Brantford Alexanders	Brantford Civic Centre

March 26	Brantford Alexanders	3 – 5	Windsor Spitfires	Windsor Arena

March 29	Windsor Spitfires	3 – 2	Brantford Alexanders	Brantford Civic Centre

March 31	Brantford Alexanders	2 – 6	Windsor Spitfires	Windsor Arena

Windsor wins series 8 – 4

=== Division finals ===
==== Leyden Division ====
===== (1) Sault Ste. Marie Greyhounds vs. (3) Kingston Canadians =====
April 7	Kingston Canadians	0 – 6	Sault Ste. Marie Greyhounds	Sault Memorial Gardens

April 8	Kingston Canadians	2 – 5	Sault Ste. Marie Greyhounds	Sault Memorial Gardens

April 11	Sault Ste. Marie Greyhounds	2 – 2	Kingston Canadians	Kingston Memorial Centre

April 12	Sault Ste. Marie Greyhounds	1 – 2	Kingston Canadians	Kingston Memorial Centre

April 14	Kingston Canadians	5 – 3	Sault Ste. Marie Greyhounds	Sault Memorial Gardens

April 16	Sault Ste. Marie Greyhounds	5 – 3	Kingston Canadians	Kingston Memorial Centre

April 18	Kingston Canadians	1 – 8	Sault Ste. Marie Greyhounds	Sault Memorial Gardens

Sault Ste. Marie wins series 9 – 5

==== Emms Division ====
===== (1) Kitchener Rangers vs. (3) Windsor Spitfires =====
April 7	Windsor Spitfires	4 – 5	Kitchener Rangers	Kitchener Memorial Auditorium

April 9	Kitchener Rangers	7 – 2	Windsor Spitfires	Windsor Arena

April 10	Windsor Spitfires	4 – 4	Kitchener Rangers	Kitchener Memorial Auditorium

April 12	Kitchener Rangers	7 – 5	Windsor Spitfires	Windsor Arena

April 14	Windsor Spitfires	0 – 4	Kitchener Rangers	Kitchener Memorial Auditorium

Kitchener wins series 9 – 1

=== J. Ross Robertson Cup ===
==== (L1) Sault Ste. Marie Greyhounds vs. (E1) Kitchener Rangers ====
April 21	Kitchener Rangers	3 – 3	Sault Ste. Marie Greyhounds	Sault Memorial Gardens

April 23	Sault Ste. Marie Greyhounds	2 – 5	Kitchener Rangers	Kitchener Memorial Auditorium

April 25	Kitchener Rangers	2 – 2	Sault Ste. Marie Greyhounds	Sault Memorial Gardens

April 26	Sault Ste. Marie Greyhounds	4 – 6	Kitchener Rangers	Kitchener Memorial Auditorium

April 28	Kitchener Rangers	4 – 4	Sault Ste. Marie Greyhounds	Sault Memorial Gardens

April 29	Sault Ste. Marie Greyhounds	1 – 2	Kitchener Rangers	Kitchener Memorial Auditorium

Kitchener wins series 9 – 3

== Awards ==
J. Ross Robertson Cup:	Kitchener Rangers
Hamilton Spectator Trophy:	Sault Ste. Marie Greyhounds
Leyden Trophy:	Sault Ste. Marie Greyhounds
Emms Trophy:	Kitchener Rangers
Red Tilson Trophy:	Ernie Godden, Windsor Spitfires
Eddie Powers Memorial Trophy:	John Goodwin, Sault Ste. Marie Greyhounds
Matt Leyden Trophy:	Brian Kilrea, Ottawa 67's
Jim Mahon Memorial Trophy:	Tony Tanti, Oshawa Generals
Max Kaminsky Trophy:	Randy Boyd, Ottawa 67's
Jack Ferguson Award:	Dan Quinn, Belleville Bulls
Dave Pinkney Trophy:	Jim Ralph, Ottawa 67's
Emms Family Award:	Tony Tanti, Oshawa Generals
F.W. 'Dinty' Moore Trophy:	John Vanbiesbrouck, Sault Ste. Marie Greyhounds
William Hanley Trophy:	John Goodwin, Sault Ste. Marie Greyhounds
Bobby Smith Trophy:	Doug Smith, Ottawa 67's

== See also ==
- List of OHA Junior A standings
- List of OHL seasons
- 1981 Memorial Cup
- 1981 NHL entry draft
- 1980 in sports
- 1981 in sports

Preceded by 1979–80 OMJHL season	OHL seasons	Succeeded by 1981–82 OHL season
