= 1984 Memorial Cup =

Canadian junior men's ice hockey championship

Tournament details
- Venue(s): Kitchener Memorial Auditorium; Kitchener, Ontario
- Dates: May 12–19, 1984
- Teams: 4
- Host team: Kitchener Rangers (OHL)

Final positions
- Champions: Ottawa 67's (OHL) (1st title)

Tournament statistics
- Games played: 8

The Memorial Cup trophy

The 1984 Memorial Cup occurred May 12–19 at the Kitchener Memorial Auditorium in Kitchener, Ontario. It was the 66th annual Memorial Cup competition and determined the major junior ice hockey champion of the Canadian Hockey League (CHL). Participating teams were the host team Kitchener Rangers, as well as the winners of the Ontario Hockey League, Quebec Major Junior Hockey League and Western Hockey League which were the Ottawa 67's, Laval Voisins and Kamloops Jr. Oilers. Ottawa won their first Memorial Cup, defeating Kitchener in the final game.

== Teams ==
QMJHL Team OHL Team WHL Team Host Team

=== Kamloops Junior Oilers ===
The Kamloops Junior Oilers represented the Western Hockey League at the 1984 Memorial Cup. The Junior Oilers finished the 1983–84 season as the top team in the WHL, earning a record of 50-22-0 for 100 points. The club was awarded the Scotty Munro Memorial Trophy for this achievement. Kamloops scored a league high 467 goals, while the club ranked fourth in goals against, as they allowed 332 goals. In the West Division semi-finals, the Junior Oilers swept the Seattle Breakers in five games. In the West Division finals, Kamloops stayed red hot, as they swept the Portland Winter Hawks in five games, advancing to the Ed Chynoweth Cup final. In the championship round, the Junior Oilers defeated the Regina Pats in a close seven game series to win the Cup and advance to the 1984 Memorial Cup.

Kamloops' offence was led by Dean Evason, who led the club with 49 goals and 137 points in 58 games. Evason ranked sixth in WHL scoring. Evason continued to lead the club offensively in the post-season, as he scored 21 goals and 41 points in 17 games. Mike Nottingham scored 48 goals and 91 points in 71 games during his rookie season with the team. Jim Camazzola joined the club in a trade midway through the season with the Seattle Breakers. In 29 games with Kamloops, Camazzola scored 29 goals and 50 points. In the post-season, Camazzola scored 12 goals and 31 points in 17 games. On defence, Doug Bodger scored 21 goals and 98 points in 70 games, as he became a top prospect for the upcoming 1984 NHL entry draft. In goal, Daryl Reaugh earned a record of 34-10-0 with a 4.34 GAA and a .864 save percentage in 55 games.

The 1984 Memorial Cup was the first time that the Junior Oilers qualified for the Memorial Cup since relocating to Kamloops. Previously, the team was the New Westminster Bruins, who won the Memorial Cup in 1977 and 1978.

=== Kitchener Rangers ===
The Kitchener Rangers represented the Ontario Hockey League as the host team at the 1984 Memorial Cup. The Rangers finished the 1983–84 season with a 52-16-2 record, earning 106 points and winning the Hamilton Spectator Trophy as the team with the best record during the regular season in the OHL. Kitchener scored a league-high 418 goals, while the club allowed 276 games, which ranked them third in the OHL. In the post-season, the Rangers swept the London Knights in four games in the Emms Division semi-finals. In the Emms Division finals, Kitchener defeated the Sault Ste. Marie Greyhounds in a thrilling seven game series, advancing to the J. Ross Robertson Cup finals. In the final round, the Rangers were defeated by the Ottawa 67's in five games.

The Rangers leading scorer was Wayne Presley, who scored 63 goals and 139 points in 70 games, finishing second in OHL scoring. Presley was awarded the Jim Mahon Memorial Trophy, awarded to the highest scoring right winger in the OHL. Kitchener received a boost when John Tucker returned to the club midway through the season after starting the season with the Buffalo Sabres. In 39 games, Tucker scored 40 goals and 100 points, and was awarded the Red Tilson Trophy as the Most Valuable Player in the OHL. In 12 playoff games, Tucker scored 12 goals and 30 points, leading the team in scoring. Greg Puhalski scored 30 goals and 99 points in 44 games, while David Bruce scored 52 goals and 92 points in 62 games. Shawn Burr scored 41 goals and 85 points in 68 games, and was awarded the Emms Family Award as the Rookie of the Year in the OHL. On defense, Jim Quinn led the scoring with nine goals and 49 points in 70 games. David Shaw scored 14 goals and 48 points in 59 games after being returned to Kitchener after beginning the season with the Quebec Nordiques. The Rangers starting goaltender was Ray LeBlanc, who posted a 3.74 GAA in 54 games during the season.

The 1984 Memorial Cup was the Rangers third appearance in team history, and third appearance in four seasons. Previously, the Rangers won the 1982 Memorial Cup, while they lost in the final in 1981.

=== Laval Voisins ===
The Laval Voisins represented the Quebec Major Junior Hockey League at the 1984 Memorial Cup. The Voisins were coached by Jean Bégin, and finished with the best record in the QMJHL during the 1983–84 season, as they had a record of 54-16-0, earning 108 points. The club won the Jean Rougeau Trophy for this accomplishment. Laval was a high-powered offensive team, leading the league with 527 goals scored, over 150 goals more than the second place club. The Voisins allowed 289 goals, the second fewest in the QMJHL. In the post-season, Laval swept the Granby Bisons in four games during the QMJHL quarter-finals. The Voisins stayed hot in the QMJHL semi-finals, as the club swept the Drummondville Voltigeurs in four games, advancing to the President's Cup finals. In the final round, Laval defeated the Longueuil Chevaliers four games to two to win the championship and earn a berth into the 1984 Memorial Cup.

The Voisins were led offensively by Mario Lemieux, who had a record-breaking season. In 70 games, Lemieux scored 133 goals and 282 points, winning the Jean Beliveau Trophy awarded to the top scorer in the QMJHL. In 14 playoff games, Lemieux scored 29 goals and 52 points, winning the Guy Lafleur Trophy as the QMJHL Playoff MVP. Lemieux was awarded the Michel Briere Memorial Trophy, awarded to the MVP of the QMJHL. He also won the Mike Bossy Trophy as the Best Pro Prospect in the QMJHL. Lemieux would later be taken first overall by the Pittsburgh Penguins at the 1984 NHL entry draft. Jacques Goyette scored 76 goals and 170 points in 62 games to finish second in league scoring. Francois Sills scored 56 goals and 130 points in 70 games, while Yves Courteau scored 45 goals and 120 points in 62 games. Alain Bisson scored 31 goals and 113 points in 59 games, as the Voisins had five players score at least 100 points. Rene Badeau led the defense with 13 goals and 51 points in 58 games after being traded to Laval by the Trois-Rivières Draveurs early in the season, while Steven Finn scored seven goals and 46 points in 68 games and Bobby Dollas scored 12 goals and 45 points in 54 games. In goal, Tony Haladuick was the starter, as he was awarded the Jacques Plante Memorial Trophy, awarded to the goaltender with the best GAA in the QMJHL. Haladuick finished the season with a 3.79 GAA in 53 games.

The 1984 Memorial Cup was the first time in team history that the Voisins had qualified for the tournament.

=== Ottawa 67's ===
The Ottawa 67's represented the Ontario Hockey League at the 1984 Memorial Cup. The 67's finished the season as the top team in the Leyden Division during the 1983–84 season, as they posted a record of 50-18-2, earning 102 points. The 67's scored 347 goals during the regular season, which ranked them sixth in the OHL. The club allowed a league-low 223 goals against. In the Leyden Division semi-finals, the 67's swept the Oshawa Generals in four games. In the Leyden Division finals, Ottawa stayed perfect, as they swept the Toronto Marlboros in four games, advancing to the J. Ross Robertson Cup finals. In the final round, the 67's defeated the Kitchener Rangers in five games to win the OHL championship and earn a berth into the 1984 Memorial Cup.

The 67's offence was led by Don McLaren, who scored a team leading 53 goals and 113 points in 70 games, as he finished in ninth in league scoring. McLaren was awarded the Leo Lalonde Memorial Trophy as the Best Overage Player in the OHL. Adam Creighton scored 42 goals and 91 points in 56 games after he was returned to the club by the Buffalo Sabres early in the season. In the playoffs, Creighton scored 16 goals and 27 points to lead the club to the OHL title. On defence, Bruce Cassidy scored 27 goals and 95 points in 67 games after beginning the season with the Chicago Blackhawks. Brad Shaw scored 11 goals and 82 points in 68 games, as he won the Max Kaminsky Trophy, awarded to the Most Outstanding Defenceman in the OHL. Goaltending duties were split by Darren Pang, who posted a 3.03 GAA in 43 games, and Greg Coram, who had a 3.32 GAA in 40 games. Pang and Coram were awarded the Dave Pinkney Trophy, awarded to the Goaltenders with the Lowest Goals Against in the OHL.

The 1984 Memorial Cup was the second time in team history that the 67's qualified for the tournament. At the 1977 Memorial Cup, Ottawa lost to the New Westminster Bruins in the final game.

== Round-robin standings ==
| Pos | Team | Pld | W | L | GF | GA | |
|---|---|---|---|---|---|---|---|
| 1 | Kitchener Rangers (OHL Host) | 3 | 3 | 0 | 24 | 11 | Advanced directly to the championship game |
| 2 | Ottawa 67's (OHL) | 3 | 2 | 1 | 13 | 13 | Advanced to the semifinal game |
| 3 | Kamloops Jr. Oilers (WHL) | 3 | 1 | 2 | 12 | 17 | Advanced to the semifinal game |
| 4 | Laval Voisins (QMJHL) | 3 | 0 | 3 | 10 | 18 | |

== Scores ==
=== Round robin ===
| May 12 | Laval Voisins | 2–8 | Kitchener Rangers | Kitchener Memorial Auditorium | Recap |
| No scoring | | First period | 2:35 - Greg Puhalski (1); 3:05 - Shawn Burr (1); 18:09 - John Tucker (1) |
| No scoring | | Second period | 2:57 - Brian Wilks (1); 9:16 - Wayne Presley (1); 11:33 - Brian Wilks (2); 12:11 - Carmine Vani (1) |
| Michel Mongeau (1) - 6:47; Yves Courteau (1) - 18:38 | | Third period | 10:13 - Carmine Vani (2) |
| Tony Haladuick (24 saves / 31 shots); Carl Parker (13 saves / 14 shots) | | Goalie stats | Ray LeBlanc (18 saves / 20 shots) |

| May 13 | Kitchener Rangers | 9–7 | Kamloops Junior Oilers | Kitchener Memorial Auditorium | Recap |
| Brian Wilks (3) - 4:24; Garnet McKechney (1) - 6:56; Wayne Presley (2) - 9:47; David Bruce (1) - 14:00; Greg Puhalski (2) - 17:50; David Shaw (1) - 19:07 | | First period | No scoring |
| Brian Wilks (4) - 7:57; Garnet McKechney (2) - 8:13 | | Second period | 12:57 - Rob Brown (1); 14:18 - Jim Camazzola (1) |
| David Bruce (2) - 19:53 | | Third period | 0:31 - Anthony Vogel (1); 5:15 - Jim Camazzola (2); 10:07 - Ryan Stewart (1); 10:30 - Ken Daneyko (1); 16:09 - Dean Evason (1) |
| Ray LeBlanc (27 saves / 34 shots) | | Goalie stats | Daryl Reaugh; Rex Grant (24 saves /33 shots) |

| May 13 | Ottawa 67's | 6–5 | Laval Voisins | Kitchener Memorial Auditorium | Recap |
| Don McLaren (1) - 5:42; Bruce Cassidy (1) - 18:35 | | First period | 1:39 - Mario Lemieux (1); 1:51 - Michel Mongeau (2); 10:14 - Yves Courteau (2) |
| Bill Bennett (1) - 1:35; Bill Bennett (2) - 17:01 | | Second period | 12:37 - Michel Mongeau (3) |
| Adam Creighton (1) - 5:50; Mark Paterson (1) - 9:07 | | Third period | 6:14 - François Sills (1) |
| Darren Pang (0 saves / 2 shots); Greg Coram (20 saves / 23 shots) | | Goalie stats | Tony Haladuick (34 saves / 40 shots) |

| May 14 | Ottawa 67's | 5–1 | Kamloops Junior Oilers | Kitchener Memorial Auditorium | Recap |
| Don McLaren (2) - 9:35; Steve Hrynewich (1) - 17:42 | | First period | No scoring |
| Adam Creighton (2) - 13:13 | | Second period | No scoring |
| Bruce Cassidy (2) - 3:52; Bruce Cassidy (3) 5:52 | | Third period | 10:45 - Anthony Vogel (2) |
| Darren Pang (17 saves / 18 shots) | | Goalie stats | Daryl Reaugh (15 saves / 20 shots) |

| May 15 | Kamloops Junior Oilers | 4–3 | Laval Voisins | Kitchener Memorial Auditorium | Recap |
| Dean Evason - 5:08 (2); Jim Camazzola - 11:20 (3) | | First period | 0:38 - François Sills (2) |
| Ken Daneyko (2) - 16:09 | | Second period | 11:23 - François Sills (3) |
| Brian Bertuzzi (1) - 6:59 | | Third period | 19:47 - Jacques Goyette (1) |
| Daryl Reaugh (22 saves / 25 shots) | | Goalie stats | Tony Haladuick (23 saves / 27 shots) |

| May 16 | Kitchener Rangers | 7–2 | Ottawa 67's | Kitchener Memorial Auditorium | Recap |
| David Shaw (2) - 2:50; Brian Wilks (5) - 8:52; Wayne Presley (3) - 13:16; Shawn Burr (2) - 17:43 | | First period | 6:18 - Bruce Cassidy (4) |
| David Shaw (3) - 17:26 | | Second period | No scoring |
| Mike Stevens (1) - 2:38; Brian Wilks (6) - 14:31 | | Third period | 6:09 - Bill Bennett (3) |
| Ray LeBlanc (36 saves / 38 shots) | | Goalie stats | Darren Pang (let in 6 goals); Greg Coram (let in 1 goal) (combined 22 saves) |

=== Semifinal ===
| May 17 | Kamloops Junior Oilers | 2–7 | Ottawa 67's | Kitchener Memorial Auditorium | Recap |
| No scoring | | First period | 3:06 - Don McLaren (3); 18:10 - Bob Giffin (1) |
| No scoring | | Second period | No scoring |
| Brian Bertuzzi (2) - 10:54; Mike Nottingham (1); 18:15 | | Third period | 0:16 - Don McLaren (4); 4:01 - Adam Creighton (3); 11:45 - Adam Creighton (4); 12:33 - Darcy Roy (1); 19:03 - Bruce Cassidy (5) |
| Daryl Reaugh (let in 6 goals); Rex Grant (let in 1 goal) (combined 25 saves) | | Goalie stats | Darren Pang (27 saves / 29 shots) |

=== Final ===
| May 19 | Ottawa 67's | 7–2 | Kitchener Rangers | Kitchener Memorial Auditorium | Recap |
| Adam Creighton (5) - 11:20; Mark Paterson (2) - 17:17; Bruce Cassidy (6) - 19:55 | | First period | 5:39 - John Tucker (2) |
| Bruce Cassidy (7) - 1:18 | | Second period | No scoring |
| Brad Shaw (1) - 3:34; Mark Paterson (3) - 12:17; Gary Roberts (1) - 19:14 | | Third period | 2:47 - Greg Puhalski (3) |
| Darren Pang (20 saves / 22 shots) | | Goalie stats | Ray LeBlanc (29 saves / 36 shots) |

=== Winning roster ===
1983-84 Ottawa 67's
| Goaltenders: – Greg Coram; – Darren Pang | Defencemen: – Bruce Cassidy; – Todd Clarke; – Bob Giffin; – Mike James; – Roy Myllari; – Mark Paterson; – Brad Shaw | Wingers: – Richard Adolfi; – Scott Hammond; – Tim Helmer; – Don McLaren; – Phil Patterson; – Gary Roberts; – Darcy Roy; – Steve Simoni | Centres: – Bill Bennett; – Adam Creighton; – John Hanna; – Steve Hrynewich; Coach: Brian Kilrea; General Manager: Brian Kilrea |

== Award winners ==
- Stafford Smythe Memorial Trophy (MVP): Adam Creighton, Ottawa
- George Parsons Trophy (Sportsmanship): Brian Wilks, Kitchener
- Hap Emms Memorial Trophy (Goaltender): Darren Pang, Ottawa

All-star team

- Goal: Darren Pang, Ottawa
- Defence: Dave Shaw, Kitchener; Bruce Cassidy, Ottawa
- Centre: Adam Creighton, Ottawa
- Left wing: Jim Camazzola, Kitchener
- Right wing: Don McLaren, Ottawa
