= Wayne Presley =

American ice hockey player (born 1965)

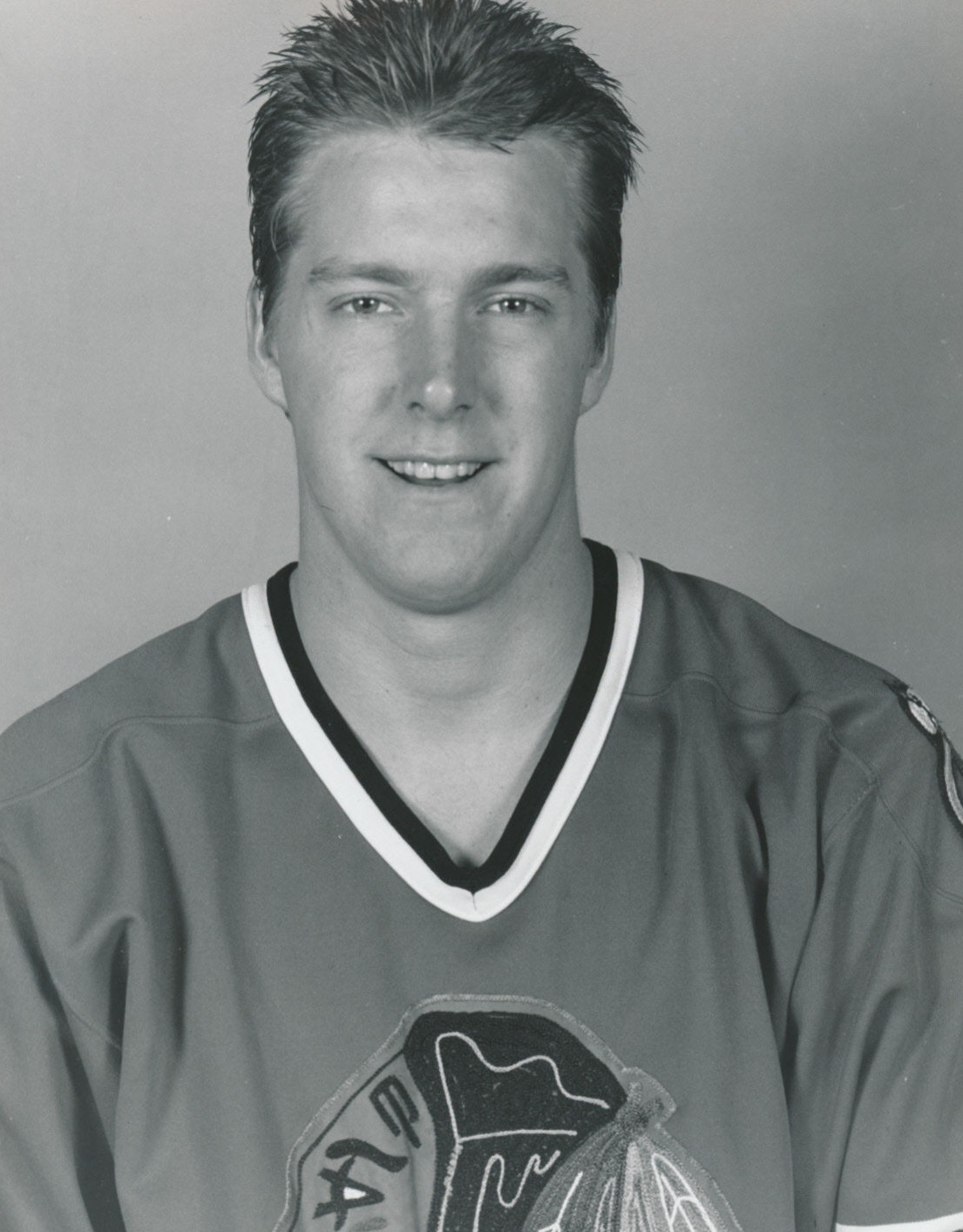
- Presley in 1987
- Born: March 23, 1965 (age 61) Dearborn, Michigan, U.S.
- Height: 5 ft 11 in (180 cm)
- Weight: 180 lb (82 kg; 12 st 12 lb)
- Position: Right wing
- Shot: Right
- Played for: NHL; Chicago Blackhawks; San Jose Sharks; Buffalo Sabres; New York Rangers; Toronto Maple Leafs; IHL; Detroit Vipers
- National team: United States
- NHL draft: 39th overall, 1983; Chicago Black Hawks
- Playing career: 1984–1998

Wayne Richard Presley (born March 23, 1965) is an American former professional ice hockey right winger who played 12 seasons in the National Hockey League from 1984–85 until 1995–96.

== Biography ==
Presley was born in Dearborn, Michigan and raised in Taylor, Michigan. As a youth, he played in the 1978 Quebec International Pee-Wee Hockey Tournament with a minor ice hockey team from Detroit.

Presley was drafted 39th by the Chicago Black Hawks in the 1983 NHL entry draft. His best statistical season was the 1986–87 NHL season, when he scored 32 goals and 61 points. He also scored five shorthanded goals in consecutive years, 1993–94 and 1994–95. He played 684 career NHL games, scoring 155 goals and 147 assists for 302 points.

Presley also represented the United States at the 1987 Canada Cup.

== Career statistics ==
=== Regular season and playoffs ===
			Regular season					Playoffs
Season	Team	League	GP	G	A	Pts	PIM	GP	G	A	Pts	PIM
1981–82	Detroit Little Caesars	Midget	61	35	56	91	146	—	—	—	—	—
1982–83	Kitchener Rangers	OHL	70	39	48	87	99	12	1	4	5	9
1983–84	Kitchener Rangers	OHL	70	63	76	139	156	16	12	16	28	38
1983–84	Kitchener Rangers	MC	—	—	—	—	—	4	3	2	5	7
1984–85	Chicago Black Hawks	NHL	3	0	1	1	0	—	—	—	—	—
1984–85	Kitchener Rangers	OHL	31	25	21	46	77	—	—	—	—	—
1984–85	Sault Ste. Marie Greyhounds	OHL	11	5	9	14	14	16	13	9	22	13
1984–85	Sault Ste. Marie Greyhounds	MC	—	—	—	—	—	4	2	2	4	4
1985–86	Chicago Black Hawks	NHL	38	7	8	15	38	3	0	0	0	0
1985–86	Nova Scotia Oilers	AHL	29	6	9	15	22	—	—	—	—	—
1986–87	Chicago Blackhawks	NHL	80	32	29	61	114	4	1	0	1	9
1987–88	Chicago Blackhawks	NHL	42	12	10	22	52	5	0	0	0	4
1988–89	Chicago Blackhawks	NHL	72	21	19	40	100	14	7	5	12	18
1989–90	Chicago Blackhawks	NHL	49	6	7	13	69	19	9	6	15	29
1990–91	Chicago Blackhawks	NHL	71	15	19	34	122	6	0	1	1	38
1991–92	San Jose Sharks	NHL	47	8	14	22	76	—	—	—	—	—
1991–92	Buffalo Sabres	NHL	12	2	2	4	57	7	3	3	6	14
1992–93	Buffalo Sabres	NHL	79	15	17	32	96	8	1	0	1	6
1993–94	Buffalo Sabres	NHL	65	17	8	25	103	7	2	1	3	14
1994–95	Buffalo Sabres	NHL	46	14	5	19	41	5	3	1	4	8
1995–96	New York Rangers	NHL	61	4	6	10	71	—	—	—	—	—
1995–96	Toronto Maple Leafs	NHL	19	2	2	4	14	5	0	0	0	2
1996–97	Detroit Vipers	IHL	42	7	16	23	80	18	0	4	4	50
1996–97	St. John's Maple Leafs	AHL	2	0	0	0	0	—	—	—	—	—
1997–98	Detroit Vipers	IHL	16	1	5	6	47	23	4	6	10	60
NHL totals			684	155	147	302	953	83	26	17	43	142

=== International ===
Year	Team	Event	GP	G	A	Pts	PIM
1987	United States	CC	5	1	0	1	12
