= Jim Mahon Memorial Trophy =

- Sport: Ice hockey
- Awarded for: Top-scoring right winger in the Ontario Hockey League

History
- First award: 1972
- Most recent: Nikita Klepov

The Jim Mahon Memorial Trophy is awarded annually by the Ontario Hockey League since 1972, to the right winger who scores the most points in the regular season. The Peterborough Petes donated the Jim Mahon Memorial Trophy in his memory to the top scoring right winger in the Ontario Hockey League.

Jim Mahon (February 1952 – August 19, 1971) was a Canadian junior ice hockey player. He was born and raised in Maidstone, Ontario, and played minor hockey in Essex, Ontario. He played for the Parry Sound Brunswicks in the 1968–69 season, winning the Georgian Bay Junior C League championship. Mahon moved up to the Peterborough Petes for the 1969–70 season, scoring 28 goals, 20 assists, and 48 points as a rookie in 46 games. In the 1970–71 season, he scored 45 goals, 44 assists, and 89 points in 62 games. In the summer of 1971, Mahon died in an electrical accident at his uncle's home in Maidstone. Mahon would have been eligible for the 1972 NHL Amateur Draft.

== Winners ==
List of winners of the Jim Mahon Memorial Trophy.

| Season | Winner | Team | Goals | Assists | Points |
|---|---|---|---|---|---|
| 1971–72 | Billy Harris | Toronto Marlboros | 57 | 72 | 129 |
| 1972–73 | Dennis Ververgaert | London Knights | 58 | 89 | 147 |
| 1973–74 | Dave Gorman | St. Catharines Black Hawks | 53 | 76 | 129 |
| 1974–75 | Mark Napier | Toronto Marlboros | 66 | 64 | 130 |
| 1975–76 | Peter Lee | Ottawa 67's | 81 | 80 | 161 |
| 1976–77 | John Anderson | Toronto Marlboros | 57 | 62 | 119 |
| 1977–78 | Dino Ciccarelli | London Knights | 72 | 70 | 142 |
| 1978–79 | Mike Foligno | Sudbury Wolves | 65 | 85 | 150 |
| 1979–80 | Jim Fox | Ottawa 67's | 65 | 101 | 166 |
| 1980–81 | Tony Tanti | Oshawa Generals | 81 | 69 | 150 |
| 1981–82 | Tony Tanti | Oshawa Generals | 62 | 64 | 126 |
| 1982–83 | Ian MacInnis | Cornwall Royals | 59 | 74 | 133 |
| 1983–84 | Wayne Presley | Kitchener Rangers | 63 | 76 | 139 |
| 1984–85 | Dave MacLean | Belleville Bulls | 64 | 90 | 154 |
| 1985–86 | Ray Sheppard | Cornwall Royals | 81 | 61 | 142 |
| 1986–87 | Ron Goodall | Kitchener Rangers | 52 | 53 | 105 |
| 1987–88 | Sean Williams | Oshawa Generals | 58 | 65 | 123 |
| 1988–89 | Stan Drulia | Niagara Falls Thunder | 52 | 93 | 145 |
| 1989–90 | Owen Nolan | Cornwall Royals | 51 | 60 | 111 |
| 1990–91 | Rob Pearson | Oshawa Generals | 63 | 55 | 118 |
| 1991–92 | Darren McCarty | Belleville Bulls | 55 | 72 | 127 |
| 1992–93 | Kevin Brown | Detroit Junior Red Wings | 50 | 91 | 141 |
| 1993–94 | Kevin Brown | Detroit Junior Red Wings | 54 | 81 | 135 |
| 1994–95 | David Ling | Kingston Frontenacs | 61 | 74 | 135 |
| 1995–96 | Cameron Mann | Peterborough Petes | 42 | 60 | 102 |
| 1996–97 | Joe Seroski | Sault Ste. Marie Greyhounds | 54 | 49 | 103 |
| 1997–98 | Maxim Spiridonov | London Knights | 54 | 44 | 98 |
| 1998–99 | Norm Milley | Sudbury Wolves | 52 | 68 | 120 |
| 1999–2000 | Sheldon Keefe | Barrie Colts | 48 | 73 | 121 |
| 2000–01 | Branko Radivojevic | Belleville Bulls | 34 | 70 | 104 |
| 2001–02 | Mike Renzi | Belleville Bulls | 44 | 64 | 108 |
| 2002–03 | Matt Foy | Ottawa 67's | 61 | 71 | 132 |
| 2003–04 | Corey Perry | London Knights | 40 | 73 | 113 |
| 2004–05 | Corey Perry | London Knights | 47 | 83 | 130 |
| 2005–06 | Dave Bolland | London Knights | 57 | 73 | 130 |
| 2006–07 | Patrick Kane | London Knights | 62 | 83 | 145 |
| 2007–08 | John Hughes | Brampton Battalion | 28 | 63 | 91 |
| 2008–09 | Bryan Cameron | Belleville Bulls | 37 | 44 | 81 |
| 2009–10 | Taylor Beck | Guelph Storm | 39 | 54 | 93 |
| 2010–11 | Tyler Toffoli | Ottawa 67's | 57 | 51 | 108 |
| 2010–11 | Jason Akeson | Kitchener Rangers | 24 | 84 | 108 |
| 2011–12 | Tyler Toffoli | Ottawa 67's | 52 | 48 | 100 |
| 2012–13 | Seth Griffith | London Knights | 33 | 48 | 81 |
| 2013–14 | Connor Brown | Erie Otters | 45 | 83 | 128 |
| 2014–15 | Mitch Marner | London Knights | 44 | 82 | 126 |
| 2015–16 | Kevin Labanc | Barrie Colts | 39 | 88 | 127 |
| 2016–17 | Alex DeBrincat | Erie Otters | 65 | 62 | 127 |
| 2017–18 | Jordan Kyrou | Sarnia Sting | 39 | 70 | 109 |
| 2018–19 | Justin Brazeau | North Bay Battalion | 61 | 52 | 113 |
| 2019–20 | Arthur Kaliyev | Hamilton Bulldogs | 44 | 54 | 98 |
| 2020–21 | Not awarded, season cancelled due to COVID-19 pandemic | | | | |
| 2021–22 | Lucas Edmonds | Kingston Frontenacs | 34 | 79 | 113 |
| 2022–23 | Matthew Maggio | Windsor Spitfires | 54 | 57 | 111 |
| 2023–24 | David Goyette | Sudbury Wolves | 40 | 77 | 117 |
| 2024–25 | Nick Lardis | Brantford Bulldogs | 71 | 46 | 117 |
| 2025–26 | Nikita Klepov | Saginaw Spirit | 37 | 60 | 97 |

== See also ==
- List of Canadian Hockey League awards
