= John Goodwin (ice hockey) =

Canadian ice hockey player

- Born: September 25, 1961 (age 64) Scarborough, Ontario, Canada
- Height: 6 ft 0 in (183 cm)
- Weight: 165 lb (75 kg; 11 st 11 lb)
- Position: Centre
- Shot: Left
- Played for: Nova Scotia Voyageurs; New Haven Nighthawks; Peoria Rivermen; St. Catharines Saints
- NHL draft: Undrafted
- Playing career: 1981–1987

John Goodwin (born September 25, 1961) is a Canadian former ice hockey centre.

== Junior career ==
Goodwin had a very successful junior career for the Sault Ste. Marie Greyhounds of the Ontario Hockey League (OHL). Goodwin lead the league in scoring in the 1980-81 OHL season and in turn won the Eddie Powers Memorial Trophy. Additionally, in that season he won the William Hanley Trophy as the most sportsmanlike player. In the 1978–79 OMJHL season he won the Emms Family Award as the top first year player.

== Professional career ==
Goodwin played five full seasons in the American Hockey League - three with the Nova Scotia Voyageurs, one with the New Haven Nighthawks, and one with the St. Catharines Saints. Goodwin also played two full seasons in the International Hockey League with the Peoria Rivermen.

== Coaching career ==
From 1997-2000 Goodwin was the coach of the Oshawa Generals, winning 97 games. He is now an assistant coach for the Kingston Frontenacs.

== Awards and honours ==
Award	Year
OHL
William Hanley Trophy	1981
Eddie Powers Memorial Trophy	1981
Emms Family Award	1979
