= Leyden Trophy =

- Sport: Ice hockey
- Awarded for: Regular season champion, East division

History
- First award: 1976
- Most wins: Ottawa 67's (18)
- Most recent: Brantford Bulldogs

The Leyden Trophy is awarded to the regular season champion of the East division in the Ontario Hockey League. The award was first presented in 1975–76 to the winners of the Leyden division. The league realigned into three divisions for 1994–95, and the award has since been presented to the East Division.

It is named in honour of Matt Leyden, a former president of the Ontario Hockey Association, and long-time general manager of the Oshawa Generals. Leyden established the Generals dynasty that won seven consecutive J. Ross Robertson Cups and three Memorial Cups between 1937 and 1944.

== Winners ==
List of winners of the Leyden Trophy.

Season	Team	GP	W	L	T	OTL	Pts	GF	GA
1975–76	Sudbury Wolves	66	47	11	8	—	102	384	224
1976–77	Ottawa 67's	66	38	23	5	—	81	348	288
1977–78	Ottawa 67's	68	43	18	7	—	93	405	308
1978–79	Peterborough Petes	68	46	19	3	—	95	341	245
1979–80	Peterborough Petes	68	47	20	1	—	95	316	238
1980–81	Sault Ste. Marie Greyhounds	68	47	19	2	—	96	412	290
1981–82	Ottawa 67's	68	47	19	2	—	96	353	248
1982–83	Ottawa 67's	70	46	21	3	—	95	395	278
1983–84	Ottawa 67's	70	50	18	2	—	102	347	223
1984–85	Peterborough Petes	66	42	20	4	—	88	354	233
1985–86	Peterborough Petes	66	45	19	2	—	92	298	190
1986–87	Oshawa Generals	66	49	14	3	—	101	322	201
1987–88	Peterborough Petes	66	44	17	5	—	93	323	212
1988–89	Peterborough Petes	66	42	22	2	—	86	302	235
1989–90	Oshawa Generals	66	42	20	4	—	88	334	244
1990–91	Oshawa Generals	66	47	13	6	—	100	382	233
1991–92	Peterborough Petes	66	41	18	7	—	89	319	256
1992–93	Peterborough Petes	66	46	15	5	—	97	352	239
1993–94	North Bay Centennials	66	46	15	5	—	97	351	226
1994–95	Kingston Frontenacs	66	40	19	7	—	87	284	224
1995–96	Ottawa 67's	66	39	22	5	—	83	258	200
1996–97	Ottawa 67's	66	49	11	6	—	104	320	177
1997–98	Ottawa 67's	66	40	17	9	—	89	286	172
1998–99	Ottawa 67's	68	48	13	7	—	103	305	164
1999–2000	Ottawa 67's	68	43	20	4	1	91	269	189
2000–01	Belleville Bulls	68	37	23	5	3	82	275	224
2001–02	Belleville Bulls	68	39	23	4	2	84	279	218
2002–03	Ottawa 67's	68	44	14	7	3	98	318	210
2003–04	Ottawa 67's	68	29	26	9	4	71	238	220
2004–05	Peterborough Petes	68	34	21	9	4	81	238	215
Season	Team	GP	W	L	OTL	SL	Pts	GF	GA
2005–06	Peterborough Petes	68	47	16	2	3	99	269	199
2006–07	Belleville Bulls	68	39	24	0	5	83	260	227
2007–08	Belleville Bulls	68	48	14	4	2	102	280	175
2008–09	Belleville Bulls	68	47	17	2	2	98	258	176
2009–10	Ottawa 67's	68	37	23	5	3	82	246	219
2010–11	Ottawa 67's	68	44	19	3	2	93	278	199
2011–12	Ottawa 67's	68	40	20	5	3	88	268	216
2012–13	Belleville Bulls	68	44	16	5	3	96	228	167
2013–14	Oshawa Generals	68	42	20	0	6	90	232	187
2014–15	Oshawa Generals	68	51	11	2	4	108	292	157
2015–16	Kingston Frontenacs	68	46	17	3	2	97	252	189
2016–17	Peterborough Petes	68	42	21	2	3	89	239	221
2017–18	Hamilton Bulldogs	68	43	18	4	3	93	252	207
2018–19	Ottawa 67's	68	50	12	4	2	106	296	183
2019–20	Ottawa 67's	62	50	11	0	1	101	296	165
2020–21	Not awarded, season cancelled due to COVID-19 pandemic								
2021–22	Hamilton Bulldogs	68	51	12	3	2	107	300	176
2022–23	Ottawa 67's	68	51	12	3	2	107	286	171
2023–24	Oshawa Generals	68	40	19	7	2	89	273	204
2024–25	Brantford Bulldogs	68	44	19	5	0	93	281	221
2025–26	Brantford Bulldogs	68	48	10	8	2	106	296	190
