= Yves Courteau =

Canadian ice hockey player (born 1964)

- Born: April 25, 1964 (age 62) Montreal, Quebec, Canada
- Height: 6 ft 0 in (183 cm)
- Weight: 194 lb (88 kg; 13 st 12 lb)
- Position: Right wing
- Shot: Right
- Played for: Calgary Flames; Hartford Whalers
- NHL draft: 23rd overall, 1982; Detroit Red Wings
- Playing career: 1984–1988

Yves Courteau (born April 25, 1964) is a Canadian former professional ice hockey forward who played in the National Hockey League for the Calgary Flames and Hartford Whalers from 1984–87. Courteau was drafted by the Detroit Red Wings in the 2nd round, 23rd overall in the 1982 NHL entry draft. He played 22 games in the NHL, recording two goals and five assists. Courteau also appeared in one playoff game with the Flames in 1986.

Courteau was born in Montreal, Quebec. He represented Canada at the 1984 World Junior Hockey Championship.Married with 2 kids.

== Career statistics ==
=== Regular season and playoffs ===
			Regular season					Playoffs
Season	Team	League	GP	G	A	Pts	PIM	GP	G	A	Pts	PIM
1979–80	Laval Insulaires	QMAAA	42	51	44	95	22	11	10	12	22	6
1980–81	Laval Voisins	QMJHL	70	24	39	63	80	—	—	—	—	—
1981–82	Laval Voisins	QMJHL	64	30	38	68	15	18	14	13	27	28
1982–83	Laval Voisins	QMJHL	68	44	78	122	52	12	4	11	15	0
1982–83	Colorado Flames	CHL	—	—	—	—	—	1	0	0	0	0
1983–84	Laval Voisins	QMJHL	62	45	75	120	52	14	11	16	27	6
1983–84	Laval Voisins	M-Cup	—	—	—	—	—	3	2	3	5	0
1984–85	Calgary Flames	NHL	14	1	4	5	4	—	—	—	—	—
1984–85	Moncton Golden Flames	AHL	59	19	21	40	32	—	—	—	—	—
1985–86	Calgary Flames	NHL	4	1	1	2	0	1	0	0	0	0
1985–86	Moncton Golden Flames	AHL	70	26	22	48	19	10	4	2	6	5
1986–87	Hartford Whalers	NHL	4	0	0	0	0	—	—	—	—	—
1986–87	Binghamton Whalers	AHL	57	15	28	43	8	7	1	4	5	12
1987–88	Binghamton Whalers	AHL	25	15	22	37	22	4	2	0	2	0
AHL totals			211	75	93	168	81	21	7	6	13	17
NHL totals			22	2	5	7	4	1	0	0	0	0

=== International ===
Year	Team	Event	GP	G	A	Pts	PIM
1984	Canada	WJC	7	0	1	1	0
Junior totals			7	0	1	1	0
