= Dave Moylan =

Canadian ice hockey player

- Born: August 13, 1967 (age 58) Tillsonburg, Ontario, Canada
- Height: 6 ft 2 in (188 cm)
- Weight: 198 lb (90 kg; 14 st 2 lb)
- Position: Defence
- Shot: Left
- Played for: AHL; Rochester Americans; Baltimore Skipjacks; New Haven Nighthawks; IHL; Flint Spirits; Kalamazoo Wings; Phoenix Roadrunners; CoHL; Brantford Smoke; SM-liiga; Jokerit
- NHL draft: 77th overall, 1985; Buffalo Sabres
- Playing career: 1987–1994

Dave Moylan (born August 13, 1967) is a Canadian former professional ice hockey defenceman. He was drafted by the Buffalo Sabres in the fourth round (77th overall) of the 1985 NHL entry draft.

Moylan was selected first overall by the Sudbury Wolves in the 1984 Ontario Hockey League (OHL) Priority Selection and played major junior hockey in the OHL from 1984 to 1987 for the Sudbury Wolves and Kitchener Rangers. He won a silver medal with Team Canada at the 1986 World Junior Ice Hockey Championships.

During the 1989–90 season, while playing with Jokerit in the Finnish SM-liiga, Moylan led the league with 107 penalty minutes.

Awards and achievements
Preceded by Trevor Stienburg	Jack Ferguson Award; 1984	Succeeded by Bryan Fogarty
