= 1983–84 OHL season =

Junior ice hockey season

The 1983–84 OHL season was the fourth season of the Ontario Hockey League. The Leo Lalonde Memorial Trophy is inaugurated for the overage player of the year. Fifteen teams each played 70 games. The Ottawa 67's won the J. Ross Robertson Cup, defeating the Kitchener Rangers.

== Regular season ==
=== Final standings ===
Note: GP = Games played; W = Wins; L = Losses; T = Ties; GF = Goals for; GA = Goals against; PTS = Points; x = clinched playoff berth; y = clinched first round bye; z = clinched division title & first round bye

=== Leyden Division ===
Rank	Team	GP	W	L	T	PTS	GF	GA
1	z-Ottawa 67's	70	50	18	2	102	347	223
2	y-Toronto Marlboros	70	45	24	1	91	392	317
3	x-Peterborough Petes	70	43	23	4	90	380	307
4	x-Oshawa Generals	70	37	32	1	75	315	297
5	x-Belleville Bulls	70	33	37	0	66	319	304
6	x-Cornwall Royals	70	33	37	0	66	348	375
7	Kingston Canadians	70	25	45	0	50	313	378

=== Emms Division ===
Rank	Team	GP	W	L	T	PTS	GF	GA
1	z-Kitchener Rangers	70	52	16	2	106	418	276
2	y-Brantford Alexanders	70	39	28	3	81	303	235
3	x-Sault Ste. Marie Greyhounds	70	38	28	4	80	373	321
4	x-London Knights	70	32	37	1	65	288	319
5	x-North Bay Centennials	70	22	43	5	49	236	327
6	x-Windsor Spitfires	70	22	46	2	46	280	379
7	Guelph Platers	70	20	46	4	44	252	366
8	Sudbury Wolves	70	19	50	1	39	287	427

=== Scoring leaders ===
Player	Team	GP	G	A	Pts	PIM
Tim Salmon	Kingston Canadians	69	45	100	145	35
Wayne Presley	Kitchener Rangers	70	63	76	139	156
Wayne Groulx	Sault Ste. Marie Greyhounds	70	59	78	137	48
Peter Zezel	Toronto Marlboros	68	47	86	133	31
Dave Gans	Oshawa Generals	62	56	76	132	89
Kevin Conway	Sault Ste. Marie Greyhounds/Kingston Canadians	63	65	65	130	20
Doug Evans	Peterborough Petes	61	45	79	124	98
Scott Morrison	London Knights	70	47	73	120	30
Don McLaren	Ottawa 67's	70	53	60	113	20
Scott Tottle	Peterborough Petes	70	63	47	110	24

== Playoffs ==
Division quarter-finals
L4	Oshawa	6
L5	Belleville	0
L3	Peterborough	6
L6	Cornwall	0
E4	London	6
E5	North Bay	2
E3	Sault Ste. Marie	6
E6	Windsor	0

Division semi-finals
L1	Ottawa	8
L4	Oshawa	0
L2	Toronto	8
L3	Peterborough	2
E1	Kitchener	8
E4	London	0
E2	Brantford	4
E3	Sault Ste. Marie	8

Division finals
L1	Ottawa	8
L2	Toronto	0
E1	Kitchener	8
E3	Sault Ste. Marie	6

J. Ross Robertson Cup
L1	Ottawa	8
E1	Kitchener	2

=== Division quarter-finals ===
==== Leyden Division ====
===== (3) Peterborough Petes vs. (6) Cornwall Royals =====
March 21	Cornwall Royals	2 – 5	Peterborough Petes	Peterborough Memorial Centre

March 22	Peterborough Petes	5 – 4	Cornwall Royals	Cornwall Civic Complex

March 24	Cornwall Royals	4 – 9	Peterborough Petes	Peterborough Memorial Centre

Peterborough wins series 6 – 0

===== (4) Oshawa Generals vs. (5) Belleville Bulls =====
March 20	Belleville Bulls	3 – 5	Oshawa Generals	Oshawa Civic Auditorium

March 21	Oshawa Generals	5 – 3	Belleville Bulls	Yardmen Arena

March 23	Belleville Bulls	0 – 3	Oshawa Generals	Oshawa Civic Auditorium

Oshawa wins series 6 – 0

==== Emms Division ====
===== (3) Sault Ste. Marie Greyhounds vs. (6) Windsor Spitfires =====
March 20	Windsor Spitfires	3 – 6	Sault Ste. Marie Greyhounds	Sault Memorial Gardens

March 22	Sault Ste. Marie Greyhounds	6 – 1	Windsor Spitfires	Windsor Arena

March 24	Windsor Spitfires	3 – 11	Sault Ste. Marie Greyhounds	Sault Memorial Gardens

Sault Ste. Marie wins series 6 – 0

===== (4) London Knights vs. (5) North Bay Centennials =====
March 20	North Bay Centennials	1 – 6	London Knights	London Gardens

March 22	London Knights	1 – 4	North Bay Centennials	North Bay Memorial Gardens

March 23	North Bay Centennials	4 – 5	London Knights	London Gardens

March 25	London Knights	8 – 7	North Bay Centennials	North Bay Memorial Gardens

London wins series 6 – 2

=== Division semi-finals ===
==== Leyden Division ====
===== (1) Ottawa 67's vs. (4) Oshawa Generals =====
March 30	Oshawa Generals	0 – 6	Ottawa 67's	Ottawa Civic Centre

April 1	Ottawa 67's	5 – 1	Oshawa Generals	Oshawa Civic Auditorium

April 3	Oshawa Generals	5 – 6	Ottawa 67's	Ottawa Civic Centre

April 5	Ottawa 67's	4 – 3	Oshawa Generals	Oshawa Civic Auditorium

Ottawa wins series 8 – 0

===== (2) Toronto Marlboros vs. (3) Peterborough Petes =====
March 31	Peterborough Petes	4 – 7	Toronto Marlboros	Maple Leaf Gardens

April 1	Toronto Marlboros	4 – 2	Peterborough Petes	Peterborough Memorial Centre

April 3	Peterborough Petes	4 – 5	Toronto Marlboros	Maple Leaf Gardens

April 4	Toronto Marlboros	2 – 13	Peterborough Petes	Peterborough Memorial Centre

April 7	Peterborough Petes	5 – 7	Toronto Marlboros	Maple Leaf Gardens

Toronto wins series 8 – 2

==== Emms Division ====
===== (1) Kitchener Rangers vs. (4) London Knights =====
March 30	London Knights	3 – 11	Kitchener Rangers	Kitchener Memorial Auditorium

April 1	Kitchener Rangers	6 – 4	London Knights	London Gardens

April 3	London Knights	5 – 7	Kitchener Rangers	Kitchener Memorial Auditorium

April 6	Kitchener Rangers	4 – 2	London Knights	London Gardens

Kitchener wins series 8 – 0

===== (2) Brantford Alexanders vs. (3) Sault Ste. Marie Greyhounds =====
March 29	Sault Ste. Marie Greyhounds	4 – 4	Brantford Alexanders	Brantford Civic Centre

March 31	Sault Ste. Marie Greyhounds	3 – 3	Brantford Alexanders	Brantford Civic Centre

April 4	Brantford Alexanders	1 – 5	Sault Ste. Marie Greyhounds	Sault Memorial Gardens

April 6	Brantford Alexanders	1 – 1	Sault Ste. Marie Greyhounds	Sault Memorial Gardens

April 8	Sault Ste. Marie Greyhounds	4 – 4	Brantford Alexanders	Brantford Civic Centre

April 10	Brantford Alexanders	3 – 6	Sault Ste. Marie Greyhounds	Sault Memorial Gardens

Sault Ste. Marie wins series 8 – 4

=== Division finals ===
==== Leyden Division ====
===== (1) Ottawa 67's vs. (2) Toronto Marlboros =====
April 13	Toronto Marlboros	2 – 9	Ottawa 67's	Ottawa Civic Centre

April 15	Ottawa 67's	5 – 2	Toronto Marlboros	Maple Leaf Gardens

April 17	Toronto Marlboros	2 – 10	Ottawa 67's	Ottawa Civic Centre

April 19	Ottawa 67's	4 – 2	Toronto Marlboros	Maple Leaf Gardens

Ottawa wins series 8 – 0

==== Emms Division ====
===== (1) Kitchener Rangers vs. (3) Sault Ste. Marie Greyhounds =====
April 13	Sault Ste. Marie Greyhounds	4 – 6	Kitchener Rangers	Kitchener Memorial Auditorium

April 15	Sault Ste. Marie Greyhounds	3 – 7	Kitchener Rangers	Kitchener Memorial Auditorium

April 19	Kitchener Rangers	4 – 9	Sault Ste. Marie Greyhounds	Sault Memorial Gardens

April 21	Kitchener Rangers	2 – 1	Sault Ste. Marie Greyhounds	Sault Memorial Gardens

April 22	Sault Ste. Marie Greyhounds	5 – 4	Kitchener Rangers	Kitchener Memorial Auditorium

April 24	Kitchener Rangers	6 – 11	Sault Ste. Marie Greyhounds	Sault Memorial Gardens

April 25	Sault Ste. Marie Greyhounds	3 – 7	Kitchener Rangers	Kitchener Memorial Auditorium

Kitchener wins series 8 – 6

=== J. Ross Robertson Cup ===
==== (L1) Ottawa 67's vs. (E1) Kitchener Rangers ====
April 27	Kitchener Rangers	5 – 5	Ottawa 67's	Ottawa Civic Centre

April 29	Kitchener Rangers	4 – 13	Ottawa 67's	Ottawa Civic Centre

May 2	Ottawa 67's	6 – 5	Kitchener Rangers	Kitchener Memorial Auditorium

May 4	Ottawa 67's	5 – 5	Kitchener Rangers	Kitchener Memorial Auditorium

May 6	Ottawa 67's	9 – 7	Kitchener Rangers	Kitchener Memorial Auditorium

Ottawa wins series 8 – 2

== Awards ==
J. Ross Robertson Cup:	Ottawa 67's
Hamilton Spectator Trophy:	Kitchener Rangers
Leyden Trophy:	Ottawa 67's
Emms Trophy:	Kitchener Rangers
Red Tilson Trophy:	John Tucker, Kitchener Rangers
Eddie Powers Memorial Trophy:	Tim Salmon, Kingston Canadians
Matt Leyden Trophy:	Tom Barrett, Kitchener Rangers
Jim Mahon Memorial Trophy:	Wayne Presley, Kitchener Rangers
Max Kaminsky Trophy:	Brad Shaw, Ottawa 67's
Jack Ferguson Award:	Dave Moylan, Sudbury Wolves
Dave Pinkney Trophy:	Darren Pang and Scott Coram, Ottawa 67's
Emms Family Award:	Shawn Burr, Kitchener Rangers
F.W. 'Dinty' Moore Trophy:	Gary Iuliano, Sault Ste. Marie Greyhounds
William Hanley Trophy:	Kevin Conway, Kingston Canadians
Leo Lalonde Memorial Trophy:	Don McLaren, Ottawa 67's
Bobby Smith Trophy:	Scott Tottle, Peterborough Petes

== 1984 OHL Priority Selection ==
The Sudbury Wolves held the first overall pick in the 1984 Ontario Priority Selection and selected Dave Moylan from the St. Mary's Lincolns. Moylan was awarded the Jack Ferguson Award, awarded to the top pick in the draft.

Below are the players who were selected in the first round of the 1984 Ontario Hockey League Priority Selection.

#	Player	Nationality	OHL Team	Hometown	Minor Team
1	Dave Moylan (D)	Canada	Sudbury Wolves	Tillsonburg, Ontario	St. Mary's Lincolns
2	Guy Larose (C)	Canada	Guelph Platers	Hull, Quebec	Ottawa Jr. Senators
3	Herb Raglan (RW)	Canada	Kingston Canadians	Peterborough, Ontario	Peterborough Petes Midgets
4	Kevin Kerr (RW)	Canada	Windsor Spitfires	North Bay, Ontario	North Bay Centennials
5	Jeff Greenlaw (LW)	Canada	North Bay Centennials	Toronto, Ontario	St. Catharines Falcons
6	Bruce Rendall (LW)	Canada	London Knights	Thunder Bay, Ontario	Thunder Bay Beavers
7	Jeff Smith (C)	Canada	Cornwall Royals	Forest, Ontario	Strathroy Blades
8	John Purves (RW)	Canada	Belleville Bulls	Malton, Ontario	North York Rangers
9	Shane Whelan (C)	Canada	Oshawa Generals	Kirkland Lake, Ontario	Newmarket Flyers
10	Rob Zettler (D)	Canada	Sault Ste. Marie Greyhounds	Sault Ste. Marie, Ontario	Sault Ste. Marie Legion
11	Brad Dalgarno (RW)	Canada	Brantford Alexanders	Whitby, Ontario	Markham Travelways
12	Glen Seabrooke (C)	Canada	Peterborough Petes	Peterborough, Ontario	Peterborough Petes Midgets
13	Yvon Corriveau (LW)	Canada	Toronto Marlboros	Welland, Ontario	Welland Cougars
14	David Baseggio (D)	Canada	Ottawa 67's	Niagara Falls, Ontario	Niagara Falls Canucks
15	Craig Wolanin (D)	United States	Kitchener Rangers	Warren, Michigan	Detroit Compuware

== See also ==
- List of OHA Junior A standings
- List of OHL seasons
- 1984 Memorial Cup
- 1984 NHL entry draft
- 1983 in sports
- 1984 in sports

Preceded by 1982–83 OHL season	OHL seasons	Succeeded by 1984–85 OHL season
