= 1981–82 OHL season =

Junior ice hockey season

The 1981–82 OHL season was the second season of the Ontario Hockey League. The league grows by two teams when, the Cornwall Royals are transferred from the Quebec Major Junior Hockey League, and the Belleville Bulls are awarded a franchise. Fourteen teams each played 68 games. The Kitchener Rangers won the J. Ross Robertson Cup, defeating the Ottawa 67's.

== Expansion and Realignment ==
The league expanded by two teams, as the Belleville Bulls and the Cornwall Royals joined the Ontario Hockey League. Both teams joined the Leyden Division, as the Sault Ste. Marie Greyhounds moved to the Emms Division.

=== Belleville Bulls ===
On February 2, 1981, the OHL granted a franchise to the city of Belleville and the ownership group of Dr. Robert L. Vaughan and Bob Dolan. The Bulls would play their home games at the Yardmen Arena. The Bulls would join the Leyden Division.

Prior to joining the OHL, the Bulls played in the Ontario Provincial Junior A Hockey League, beginning in the 1979–80 season. In their final season in the league, Belleville defeated the Guelph Platers to win the OPJHL championship. The club would reach the 1981 Centennial Cup finals, where they lost to the Prince Albert Raiders of the Saskatchewan Junior Hockey League 6–2 in the championship game.

=== Cornwall Royals ===
The Cornwall Royals were transferred to the Ontario Hockey League from the Quebec Major Junior Hockey League for the 1981–82 season. Originally an expansion team in 1969, the Royals were a very successful club in the QMJHL, winning the Memorial Cup three times, in 1971, 1980, and 1981. Cornwall would play their home games at the Cornwall Civic Complex. The Royals would join the Leyden Division.

The Royals were able to keep their players from the previous season, including players such as Scott Arniel and Doug Gilmour, who helped lead the team to the 1981 Memorial Cup championship.

== Regular season ==
=== Final standings ===
Note: GP = Games played; W = Wins; L = Losses; T = Ties; GF = Goals for; GA = Goals against; PTS = Points; x = clinched playoff berth; y = clinched first round bye; z = clinched division title & first round bye

=== Leyden Division ===
Rank	Team	GP	W	L	T	PTS	GF	GA
1	z-Ottawa 67's	68	47	19	2	96	353	248
2	y-Oshawa Generals	68	40	26	2	82	335	296
3	x-Peterborough Petes	68	36	29	3	75	291	266
4	x-Toronto Marlboros	68	37	31	0	74	316	290
5	x-Kingston Canadians	68	29	34	5	63	302	316
6	x-Cornwall Royals	68	28	35	5	61	303	327
7	Belleville Bulls	68	24	42	2	50	280	326

=== Emms Division ===
Rank	Team	GP	W	L	T	PTS	GF	GA
1	z-Kitchener Rangers	68	44	21	3	91	322	247
2	y-Sault Ste. Marie Greyhounds	68	40	25	3	83	274	243
3	x-London Knights	68	35	30	3	73	359	328
4	x-Niagara Falls Flyers	68	31	34	3	65	311	338
5	x-Brantford Alexanders	68	25	41	2	52	293	313
6	x-Windsor Spitfires	68	22	42	4	48	269	343
7	Sudbury Wolves	68	19	48	1	39	275	401

=== Scoring leaders ===
Player	Team	GP	G	A	Pts	PIM
Dave Simpson	London Knights	68	67	88	155	18
Jeff Vaive	Ottawa 67's	68	56	95	151	90
Moe Lemay	Ottawa 67's	62	68	70	138	48
Tony Tanti	Oshawa Generals	57	62	64	126	138
Mitch Lamoureux	Oshawa Generals	66	43	78	121	275
Doug Gilmour	Cornwall Royals	67	46	73	119	42
Mario Simioni	Toronto Marlboros	68	58	60	118	88
Chris McCauley	London Knights	66	47	67	114	117
Fred Perlini	Toronto Marlboros	68	47	64	111	75
Claude Loiselle	Windsor Spitfires	68	36	73	109	192

== Playoffs ==
Division quarter-finals
L4	Toronto	6
L6	Cornwall	4
L3	Peterborough	6
L5	Kingston	2
E4	Niagara Falls	4
E6	Windsor	6
E3	London	2
E5	Brantford	6

Division semi-finals
L1	Ottawa	8
L4	Toronto	2
L2	Oshawa	8
L3	Peterborough	2
E1	Kitchener	8
E6	Windsor	0
E2	Sault Ste. Marie	8
E3	Brantford	6

Division finals
L1	Ottawa	8
L2	Oshawa	6
E1	Kitchener	9
E2	Sault Ste. Marie	3

J. Ross Robertson Cup
L1	Ottawa	1
E1	Kitchener	9

=== Division quarter-finals ===
==== Leyden Division ====
===== (3) Peterborough Petes vs. (5) Kingston Canadians =====
March 14	Kingston Canadians	2 – 5	Peterborough Petes	Peterborough Memorial Centre

March 16	Peterborough Petes	3 – 3	Kingston Canadians	Kingston Memorial Centre

March 18	Kingston Canadians	7 – 8	Peterborough Petes	Peterborough Memorial Centre

March 19	Peterborough Petes	4 – 4	Kingston Canadians	Kingston Memorial Centre

Peterborough wins series 6 – 2

===== (4) Toronto Marlboros vs. (6) Cornwall Royals =====
March 14	Cornwall Royals	5 – 9	Toronto Marlboros	Maple Leaf Gardens

March 16	Toronto Marlboros	3 – 6	Cornwall Royals	Cornwall Civic Complex

March 18	Cornwall Royals	4 – 7	Toronto Marlboros	Maple Leaf Gardens

March 20	Toronto Marlboros	5 – 5	Cornwall Royals	Cornwall Civic Complex

March 21	Cornwall Royals	5 – 5	Toronto Marlboros	Maple Leaf Gardens

Toronto wins series 6 – 4

==== Emms Division ====
===== (3) London Knights vs. (5) Brantford Alexanders =====
March 14	Brantford Alexanders	4 – 3	London Knights	London Gardens

March 16	London Knights	2 – 4	Brantford Alexanders	Brantford Civic Centre

March 18	Brantford Alexanders	2 – 4	London Knights	London Gardens

March 19	London Knights	5 – 9	Brantford Alexanders	Brantford Civic Centre

Brantford wins series 6 – 2

===== (4) Niagara Falls Flyers vs. (6) Windsor Spitfires =====
March 14	Windsor Spitfires	4 – 9	Niagara Falls Flyers	Niagara Falls Memorial Arena

March 15	Niagara Falls Flyers	2 – 3	Windsor Spitfires	Windsor Arena

March 17	Windsor Spitfires	5 – 5	Niagara Falls Flyers	Niagara Falls Memorial Arena

March 18	Niagara Falls Flyers	3 – 3	Windsor Spitfires	Windsor Arena

March 19	Windsor Spitfires	5 – 3	Niagara Falls Flyers	Niagara Falls Memorial Arena

Windsor wins series 6 – 4

=== Division semi-finals ===
==== Leyden Division ====
===== (1) Ottawa 67's vs. (4) Toronto Marlboros =====
March 23	Toronto Marlboros	4 – 6	Ottawa 67's	Ottawa Civic Centre

March 26	Toronto Marlboros	3 – 4	Ottawa 67's	Ottawa Civic Centre

March 27	Ottawa 67's	3 – 4	Toronto Marlboros	Maple Leaf Gardens

March 30	Ottawa 67's	6 – 3	Toronto Marlboros	Maple Leaf Gardens

April 2	Toronto Marlboros	2 – 6	Ottawa 67's	Ottawa Civic Centre

Ottawa wins series 8 – 2

===== (2) Oshawa Generals vs. (3) Peterborough Petes =====
March 23	Peterborough Petes	7 – 6	Oshawa Generals	Oshawa Civic Auditorium

March 25	Oshawa Generals	8 – 2	Peterborough Petes	Peterborough Memorial Centre

March 28	Peterborough Petes	4 – 5	Oshawa Generals	Oshawa Civic Auditorium

March 30	Oshawa Generals	5 – 4	Peterborough Petes	Peterborough Memorial Centre

April 1	Peterborough Petes	2 – 5	Oshawa Generals	Oshawa Civic Auditorium

Oshawa wins series 8 – 2

==== Emms Division ====
===== (1) Kitchener Rangers vs. (6) Windsor Spitfires =====
March 23	Windsor Spitfires	1 – 4	Kitchener Rangers	Kitchener Memorial Auditorium

March 25	Kitchener Rangers	2 – 0	Windsor Spitfires	Windsor Arena

March 26	Windsor Spitfires	3 – 7	Kitchener Rangers	Kitchener Memorial Auditorium

March 28	Kitchener Rangers	9 – 4	Windsor Spitfires	Windsor Arena

Kitchener wins series 8 – 0

===== (2) Sault Ste. Marie Greyhounds vs. (5) Brantford Alexanders =====
March 21	Brantford Alexanders	5 – 5	Sault Ste. Marie Greyhounds	Sault Memorial Gardens

March 22	Brantford Alexanders	2 – 4	Sault Ste. Marie Greyhounds	Sault Memorial Gardens

March 25	Brantford Alexanders	7 – 1	Sault Ste. Marie Greyhounds	Sault Memorial Gardens

March 27	Sault Ste. Marie Greyhounds	1 – 2	Brantford Alexanders	Brantford Civic Centre

March 28	Brantford Alexanders	3 – 3	Sault Ste. Marie Greyhounds	Sault Memorial Gardens

March 30	Sault Ste. Marie Greyhounds	5 – 9	Brantford Alexanders	Brantford Civic Centre

April 2	Brantford Alexanders	2 – 3	Sault Ste. Marie Greyhounds	Sault Memorial Gardens

Sault Ste. Marie wins series 8 – 6

=== Division finals ===
==== Leyden Division ====
===== (1) Ottawa 67's vs. (2) Oshawa Generals =====
April 9	Oshawa Generals	5 – 6	Ottawa 67's	Ottawa Civic Centre

April 11	Ottawa 67's	3 – 5	Oshawa Generals	Oshawa Civic Auditorium

April 13	Oshawa Generals	1 – 6	Ottawa 67's	Ottawa Civic Centre

April 15	Ottawa 67's	4 – 6	Oshawa Generals	Oshawa Civic Auditorium

April 16	Oshawa Generals	4 – 9	Ottawa 67's	Ottawa Civic Centre

April 18	Ottawa 67's	2 – 6	Oshawa Generals	Oshawa Civic Auditorium

April 20	Oshawa Generals	4 – 5	Ottawa 67's	Ottawa Civic Centre

Ottawa wins series 8 – 6

==== Emms Division ====
===== (1) Kitchener Rangers vs. (2) Sault Ste. Marie Greyhounds =====
April 4	Sault Ste. Marie Greyhounds	2 – 6	Kitchener Rangers	Kitchener Memorial Auditorium

April 6	Sault Ste. Marie Greyhounds	1 – 6	Kitchener Rangers	Kitchener Memorial Auditorium

April 9	Kitchener Rangers	4 – 4	Sault Ste. Marie Greyhounds	Sault Memorial Gardens

April 11	Kitchener Rangers	3 – 5	Sault Ste. Marie Greyhounds	Sault Memorial Gardens

April 13	Sault Ste. Marie Greyhounds	1 – 5	Kitchener Rangers	Kitchener Memorial Auditorium

April 16	Kitchener Rangers	4 – 3	Sault Ste. Marie Greyhounds	Sault Memorial Gardens

Kitchener wins series 9 – 3

=== J. Ross Robertson Cup ===
==== (L1) Ottawa 67's vs. (E1) Kitchener Rangers ====
April 23	Kitchener Rangers	4 – 4	Ottawa 67's	Ottawa Civic Centre

April 25	Ottawa 67's	1 – 4	Kitchener Rangers	Kitchener Memorial Auditorium

April 28	Kitchener Rangers	4 – 3	Ottawa 67's	Ottawa Civic Centre

April 30	Ottawa 67's	3 – 5	Kitchener Rangers	Kitchener Memorial Auditorium

May 2	Kitchener Rangers	4 – 1	Ottawa 67's	Ottawa Civic Centre

Kitchener wins series 9 – 1

== Awards ==
J. Ross Robertson Cup:	Kitchener Rangers
Hamilton Spectator Trophy:	Ottawa 67's
Leyden Trophy:	Ottawa 67's
Emms Trophy:	Kitchener Rangers
Red Tilson Trophy:	Dave Simpson, London Knights
Eddie Powers Memorial Trophy:	Dave Simpson, London Knights
Matt Leyden Trophy:	Brian Kilrea, Ottawa 67's
Jim Mahon Memorial Trophy:	Tony Tanti, Oshawa Generals
Max Kaminsky Trophy:	Ron Meighan, Niagara Falls Flyers
Jack Ferguson Award:	Kirk Muller, Guelph Platers
Dave Pinkney Trophy:	John Vanbiesbrouck and Marc D'Amour, Sault Ste. Marie Greyhounds
Emms Family Award:	Pat Verbeek, Sudbury Wolves
F.W. 'Dinty' Moore Trophy:	Shawn Kilroy, Peterborough Petes
William Hanley Trophy:	Dave Simpson, London Knights
Bobby Smith Trophy:	Dave Simpson, London Knights

== See also ==
- List of OHA Junior A standings
- List of OHL seasons
- 1982 Memorial Cup
- 1982 NHL entry draft
- 1981 in sports
- 1982 in sports

Preceded by 1980–81 OHL season	OHL seasons	Succeeded by 1982–83 OHL season
