= 1982–83 OHL season =

The 1982–83 OHL season was the third season of the Ontario Hockey League. The Niagara Falls Flyers move to North Bay, Ontario, becoming the Centennials. The Guelph Platers are granted an expansion franchise. Fifteen teams each played 70 games. The Oshawa Generals won the J. Ross Robertson Cup, defeating the Sault Ste. Marie Greyhounds.

== Expansion and Relocation ==
=== Guelph Platers ===
The Guelph Platers were approved to join the Ontario Hockey League for the 1982-83 season as the league approved an expansion team for the city of Guelph. The Platers would play in the Guelph Memorial Gardens and join the Emms Division.

The Platers previously played in the Ontario Provincial Junior A Hockey League since the 1977-78 season. The club won the 1978 Centennial Cup, defeating the Prince Albert Raiders of the Saskatchewan Junior Hockey League in a four game sweep. In the 1981-82 season, Guelph finished with a 40-4-6 record, earning 86 points and first place in the OPJHL. At the 1982 Centennial Cup, Guelph lost to Prince Albert in four games.

The Belleville Bulls, who played in the OPJHL from 1979-1981, joined the OHL one year earlier, in the 1981-82 season.

=== Niagara Falls Flyers to North Bay Centennials ===
The Niagara Falls Flyers relocated to the city of North Bay and were renamed the North Bay Centennials. The club's nickname was to commemorate the 100th anniversary of the railroad in North Bay.

The Centennials remained in the Emms Division, and would play out of the North Bay Memorial Gardens.

== Regular season ==
=== Final standings ===
Note: GP = Games played; W = Wins; L = Losses; T = Ties; GF = Goals for; GA = Goals against; PTS = Points; x = clinched playoff berth; y = clinched first round bye; z = clinched division title & first round bye

=== Leyden Division ===
Rank	Team	GP	W	L	T	PTS	GF	GA
1	z-Ottawa 67's	70	46	21	3	95	395	278
2	y-Peterborough Petes	70	46	22	2	94	367	278
3	x-Oshawa Generals	70	45	22	3	93	380	255
4	x-Toronto Marlboros	70	36	29	5	77	325	311
5	x-Cornwall Royals	70	36	33	1	73	370	335
6	x-Belleville Bulls	70	34	36	0	68	342	332
7	Kingston Canadians	70	24	45	1	49	351	425

=== Emms Division ===
Rank	Team	GP	W	L	T	PTS	GF	GA
1	z-Sault Ste. Marie Greyhounds	70	48	21	1	97	363	270
2	y-Kitchener Rangers	70	45	23	2	92	393	292
3	x-North Bay Centennials	70	44	23	3	91	352	285
4	x-Brantford Alexanders	70	34	33	3	71	275	282
5	x-London Knights	70	32	37	1	65	336	339
6	x-Windsor Spitfires	70	19	50	1	39	289	394
7	Sudbury Wolves	70	15	50	5	35	269	422
8	Guelph Platers	70	7	63	0	14	246	555

=== Scoring leaders ===
Player	Team	GP	G	A	Pts	PIM
Doug Gilmour	Cornwall Royals	68	70	107	177	62
Ron Handy	Kingston Canadians	67	52	96	148	64
Dan Quinn	Belleville Bulls	70	59	88	147	27
John Tucker	Kitchener Rangers	70	60	80	140	33
Ian MacInnis	Sault Ste. Marie Greyhounds/Cornwall Royals	68	59	74	133	29
Keith Knight	Kingston Canadians	70	56	75	131	18
Wayne Groulx	Sault Ste. Marie Greyhounds	67	44	86	130	54
Steve Driscoll	Cornwall Royals	64	49	77	126	34
Kevin Conway	Sault Ste. Marie Greyhounds	67	57	65	122	30
John Ollson	Ottawa 67's	68	46	76	122	41

== Playoffs ==
Division quarter-finals
L4	Toronto	1
L5	Cornwall	7
L3	Oshawa	7
L6	Belleville	1
E4	Brantford	6
E5	London	0
E3	North Bay	6
E6	Windsor	0

Division semi-finals
L1	Ottawa	8
L5	Cornwall	0
L2	Peterborough	0
L3	Oshawa	8
E1	Sault Ste. Marie	8
E4	Brantford	2
E2	Kitchener	8
E3	North Bay	2

Division finals
L1	Ottawa	2
L3	Oshawa	8
E1	Sault Ste. Marie	9
E2	Kitchener	5

J. Ross Robertson Cup
L3	Oshawa	8
E1	Sault Ste. Marie	0

=== Division quarter-finals ===
==== Leyden Division ====
===== (3) Oshawa Generals vs. (6) Belleville Bulls =====
March 15	Belleville Bulls	2 – 10	Oshawa Generals	Oshawa Civic Auditorium

March 16	Oshawa Generals	6 – 6	Belleville Bulls	Yardmen Arena

March 18	Belleville Bulls	3 – 10	Oshawa Generals	Oshawa Civic Auditorium

March 19	Oshawa Generals	7 – 4	Belleville Bulls	Yardmen Arena

Oshawa wins series 7 – 1

===== (4) Toronto Marlboros vs. (5) Cornwall Royals =====
March 15	Cornwall Royals	4 – 3	Toronto Marlboros	Maple Leaf Gardens

March 17	Toronto Marlboros	4 – 6	Cornwall Royals	Cornwall Civic Complex

March 19	Cornwall Royals	4 – 4	Toronto Marlboros	Maple Leaf Gardens

March 20	Toronto Marlboros	2 – 4	Cornwall Royals	Cornwall Civic Complex

Cornwall wins series 7 – 1

==== Emms Division ====
===== (3) North Bay Centennials vs. (6) Windsor Spitfires =====
March 15	Windsor Spitfires	3 – 5	North Bay Centennials	North Bay Memorial Gardens

March 17	North Bay Centennials	3 – 2	Windsor Spitfires	Windsor Arena

March 19	Windsor Spitfires	4 – 6	North Bay Centennials	North Bay Memorial Gardens

North Bay wins series 6 – 0

===== (4) Brantford Alexanders vs. (5) London Knights =====
March 15	London Knights	2 – 6	Brantford Alexanders	Brantford Civic Centre

March 17	Brantford Alexanders	4 – 3	London Knights	London Gardens

March 18	London Knights	0 – 4	Brantford Alexanders	Brantford Civic Centre

Brantford wins series 6 – 0

=== Division semi-finals ===
==== Leyden Division ====
===== (1) Ottawa 67's vs. (5) Cornwall Royals =====
March 25	Cornwall Royals	1 – 4	Ottawa 67's	Ottawa Civic Centre

March 27	Ottawa 67's	7 – 3	Cornwall Royals	Cornwall Civic Complex

March 29	Cornwall Royals	5 – 8	Ottawa 67's	Ottawa Civic Centre

March 31	Ottawa 67's	7 – 4	Cornwall Royals	Cornwall Civic Complex

Ottawa wins series 8 – 0

===== (2) Peterborough Petes vs. (3) Oshawa Generals =====
March 25	Oshawa Generals	5 – 4	Peterborough Petes	Peterborough Memorial Centre

March 27	Peterborough Petes	6 – 7	Oshawa Generals	Oshawa Civic Auditorium

March 29	Oshawa Generals	4 – 2	Peterborough Petes	Peterborough Memorial Centre

March 30	Peterborough Petes	4 – 5	Oshawa Generals	Oshawa Civic Auditorium

Oshawa wins series 8 – 0

==== Emms Division ====
===== (1) Sault Ste. Marie Greyhounds vs. (4) Brantford Alexanders =====
March 23	Brantford Alexanders	1 – 1	Sault Ste. Marie Greyhounds	Sault Memorial Gardens

March 25	Brantford Alexanders	4 – 4	Sault Ste. Marie Greyhounds	Sault Memorial Gardens

March 27	Sault Ste. Marie Greyhounds	4 – 2	Brantford Alexanders	Brantford Civic Centre

March 29	Sault Ste. Marie Greyhounds	6 – 3	Brantford Alexanders	Brantford Civic Centre

April 1	Brantford Alexanders	0 – 1	Sault Ste. Marie Greyhounds	Sault Memorial Gardens

Sault Ste. Marie wins series 8 – 2

===== (2) Kitchener Rangers vs. (3) North Bay Centennials =====
March 25	North Bay Centennials	2 – 5	Kitchener Rangers	Kitchener Memorial Auditorium

March 27	Kitchener Rangers	5 – 6	North Bay Centennials	North Bay Memorial Gardens

March 29	North Bay Centennials	1 – 6	Kitchener Rangers	Kitchener Memorial Auditorium

March 31	Kitchener Rangers	2 – 1	North Bay Centennials	North Bay Memorial Gardens

April 1	North Bay Centennials	2 – 4	Kitchener Rangers	Kitchener Memorial Auditorium

Kitchener wins series 8 – 2

=== Division finals ===
==== Leyden Division ====
===== (1) Ottawa 67's vs. (3) Oshawa Generals =====
April 8	Oshawa Generals	1 – 5	Ottawa 67's	Ottawa Civic Centre

April 10	Ottawa 67's	3 – 8	Oshawa Generals	Oshawa Civic Auditorium

April 12	Oshawa Generals	4 – 3	Ottawa 67's	Ottawa Civic Centre

April 13	Ottawa 67's	3 – 4	Oshawa Generals	Oshawa Civic Auditorium

April 15	Oshawa Generals	4 – 3	Ottawa 67's	Ottawa Civic Centre

Oshawa wins series 8 – 2

==== Emms Division ====
===== (1) Sault Ste. Marie Greyhounds vs. (2) Kitchener Rangers =====
April 8	Kitchener Rangers	5 – 4	Sault Ste. Marie Greyhounds	Sault Memorial Gardens

April 10	Kitchener Rangers	4 – 7	Sault Ste. Marie Greyhounds	Sault Memorial Gardens

April 12	Sault Ste. Marie Greyhounds	8 – 5	Kitchener Rangers	Kitchener Memorial Auditorium

April 14	Sault Ste. Marie Greyhounds	2 – 4	Kitchener Rangers	Kitchener Memorial Auditorium

April 16	Kitchener Rangers	2 – 4	Sault Ste. Marie Greyhounds	Sault Memorial Gardens

April 18	Sault Ste. Marie Greyhounds	4 – 4	Kitchener Rangers	Kitchener Memorial Auditorium

April 20	Kitchener Rangers	2 – 4	Sault Ste. Marie Greyhounds	Sault Memorial Gardens

Sault Ste. Marie wins series 9 – 5

=== J. Ross Robertson Cup ===
==== (E1) Sault Ste. Marie Greyhounds vs. (L3) Oshawa Generals ====
April 23	Oshawa Generals	6 – 3	Sault Ste. Marie Greyhounds	Sault Memorial Gardens

April 24	Oshawa Generals	4 – 3	Sault Ste. Marie Greyhounds	Sault Memorial Gardens

April 27	Sault Ste. Marie Greyhounds	4 – 7	Oshawa Generals	Oshawa Civic Auditorium

April 28	Sault Ste. Marie Greyhounds	2 – 5	Oshawa Generals	Oshawa Civic Auditorium

Oshawa wins series 8 – 0

== Awards ==
J. Ross Robertson Cup:	Oshawa Generals
Hamilton Spectator Trophy:	Sault Ste. Marie Greyhounds
Leyden Trophy:	Ottawa 67's
Emms Trophy:	Sault Ste. Marie Greyhounds
Red Tilson Trophy:	Doug Gilmour, Cornwall Royals
Eddie Powers Memorial Trophy:	Doug Gilmour, Cornwall Royals
Matt Leyden Trophy:	Terry Crisp, Sault Ste. Marie Greyhounds
Jim Mahon Memorial Trophy:	Ian MacInnis, Cornwall Royals
Max Kaminsky Trophy:	Al MacInnis, Kitchener Rangers
Jack Ferguson Award:	Trevor Steinberg, Guelph Platers
Dave Pinkney Trophy:	Peter Sidorkiewicz and Jeff Hogg, Oshawa Generals
Emms Family Award:	Bruce Cassidy, Ottawa 67's
F.W. 'Dinty' Moore Trophy:	Dan Burrows, Belleville Bulls
William Hanley Trophy:	Kirk Muller, Guelph Platers
Bobby Smith Trophy:	Dave Gagner, Brantford Alexanders

== See also ==
- List of OHA Junior A standings
- List of OHL seasons
- 1983 Memorial Cup
- 1983 NHL entry draft
- 1982 in sports
- 1983 in sports

Preceded by 1981–82 OHL season	OHL seasons	Succeeded by 1983–84 OHL season
