= Oshawa Civic Auditorium =

Former indoor arena

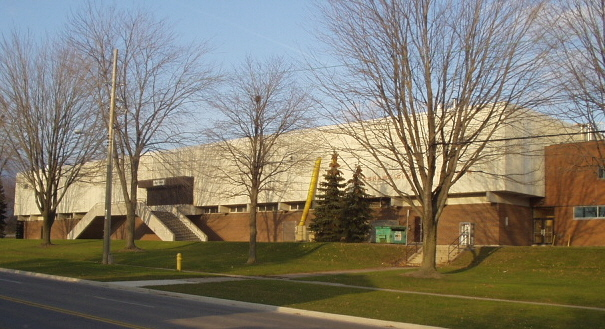
- Interactive map of Oshawa Civic Auditorium
- Address: 99 Thornton Road South
- Location: Oshawa, Ontario, Canada
- Coordinates: 43.887795°N 78.890998°W
- Owner: City of Oshawa
- Operator: City of Oshawa
- Capacity: 3,625 (seated); 4,025 (standing)

Construction
- Groundbreaking: February 28, 1964
- Opened: December 11, 1964
- Closed: October 29, 2006
- Demolished: April–July 2010
- Cost: $1.4 million

Tenants
- Oshawa Generals (OHL) (1964–2006); Oshawa Crushmen (OPJHL) (1965–1972); Oshawa Legionaires (OPJHL) (1972–2006); Oshawa Green Gaels (OLA) (1965–1996)

The Oshawa Civic Auditorium was an indoor arena in Oshawa, Ontario, Canada. It operated from 1964 to 2006, and was primarily used as an ice hockey venue for the Oshawa Generals. The auditorium was built as a replacement to the Hambly Arena, which burned down in 1953. The auditorium was part of a larger multi-purpose recreational complex.

== Construction ==
The construction of the auditorium was led by a committee of residents with the slogan: "Let's build it ourselves, for ourselves." Volunteers raised $1.4 million from the community to fund the project, including $476,000 from the local General Motors employees union (Canadian Auto Workers) through payroll reductions. The City of Oshawa provided 20 acres of land on Thornton Road South, previously designated for a cemetery. Groundbreaking for the project took place on February 28, 1964, and the formal opening took place on December 11, 1964. The auditorium capacity was 3,625 seated, and 4,025 including standing room.

== History ==
The Oshawa Generals began play at the auditorium on December 15, 1964, and won 6–4 over the St. Catharines Black Hawks. While playing at the auditorium, the Generals won five J. Ross Robertson Cups, and the 1990 Memorial Cup. The Oshawa Generals hosted the 1987 Memorial Cup tournament at the auditorium. The Generals played their final at the auditorium on October 29, 2006, and won 8–6 over the Kingston Frontenacs. The Oshawa Legionaires won three regular season Metro Junior B League titles playing at the auditorium. The Oshawa Green Gaels moved into the auditorium partway through their seven consecutive Minto Cups from 1963 to 1969.

The auditorium hosted the inaugural Wrigley Cup in 1974, a national midget hockey tournament for the top 12 teams in the country set up by Jack Devine and the Canadian Amateur Hockey Association. On April 22, 1979, the auditorium hosted two benefit concerts for the Canadian National Institute for the Blind by the Rolling Stones, after Keith Richards was charged with possession of heroin. The auditorium became home to the Oshawa Sports Hall of Fame on May 21, 1986. The auditorium became home to the world's longest hockey stick in 2003. In May 2006, Alice Cooper was one of the final concerts at the auditorium.

== Replacement ==
In June 2005, construction began on a replacement arena in downtown Oshawa. The General Motors Centre, opened as the city's new primary hockey venue in October 2006. The auditorium sat idle until demolition between April and July 2010. The former site of the auditorium became an indoor turf field.
