= Kitchener Memorial Auditorium Complex =

Multi-use facility in Kitchener, Canada

Kitchener Memorial Auditorium
- The Aud
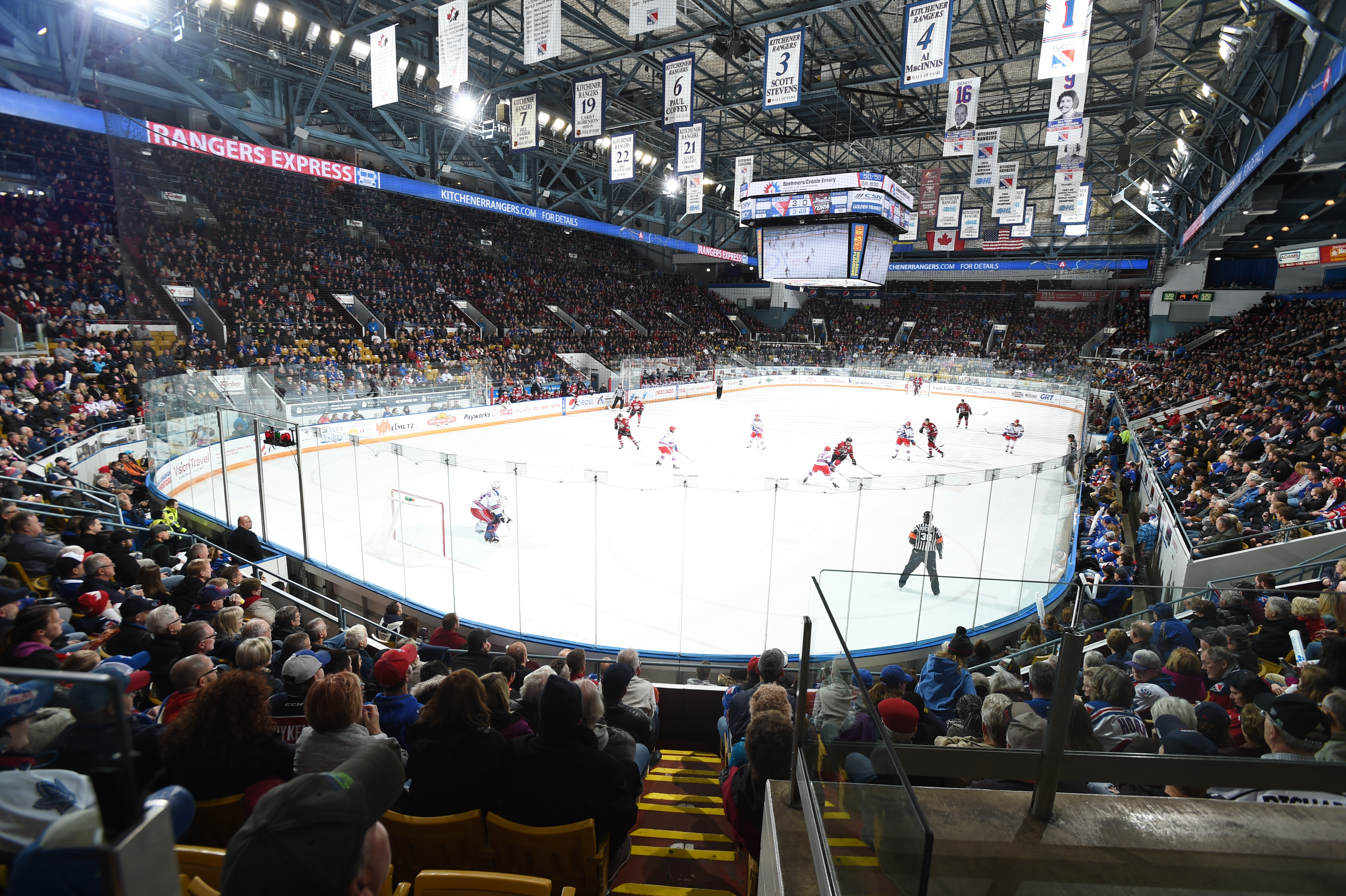

- Location within Ontario Location within Canada
- Location: Kitchener, Ontario, Canada
- Coordinates: 43°26′49″N 80°28′1″W
- Owner: City of Kitchener
- Operator: City of Kitchener
- Capacity: 7,131 (Ice hockey seated); 7,777 (with standing); 7,312 (Basketball); 8,462 (Concerts)
- Surface: Ice 200'x85'

Construction
- Groundbreaking: 1950
- Opened: May 24, 1951

Tenants
- Kitchener Greenshirts (OHA) (1951–1954); Kitchener Canucks (OHA) (1954–1956); Kitchener Dutchmen (GOJHL) (1956–2020); Kitchener Rangers (OHL) (1963–present); KW Titans (BSL) (2016–present)

The Kitchener Memorial Auditorium Complex (also known as The Aud) is a multi-use municipally owned facility in Kitchener, Ontario, Canada. The complex is located on East Avenue, near the Ottawa Street interchange on the Conestoga Parkway. The complex includes "The Kitchener Memorial Auditorium" with the Dom Cardillo Arena, two smaller community arenas the Kinsmen Arena and Kiwanis Arena, the Jack Couch Stadium baseball park, Centennial Stadium (track and field, soccer / football) and a skatepark outside the stadium.

== Kitchener Memorial Auditorium ==
The Kitchener Memorial Auditorium, or The Aud for short, includes a main ice rink (the Dom Cardillo Arena) with a seating capacity of 7,234 and a total capacity of 7,777, including standing room. It is home to the Kitchener Rangers of the Ontario Hockey League and the KW Titans of the Basketball Super League.

The original arena was built in 1950 and has been expanded three times since then.

The Aud hosted the 2008 Memorial Cup from May 16 to May 25, 2008, with 437 additional permanent seats being added. The Aud previously hosted 1962 Memorial Cup, 1975 Memorial Cup and 1984 Memorial Cup games.

Other notable junior ice hockey events include the 1995 and 2003 CHL Top Prospects Game, the 1980, 1985, 1995 Ontario Hockey League All-star games, and the 1986 World Junior Championships. During the 1986 tournament, Canada defeated West Germany 18-2 at The Aud, setting a record for most goals for, and largest margin of victory by the Canada national junior hockey team at the tournament.

The facility has also hosted major events such as: the Four Nations Cup, Homesense Skate Canada International, the Scott Tournament of Hearts, World Junior Figure Skating Championships, WCW Monday Nitro and World Wrestling Entertainment

Its also hosted concerts by notable acts such as: Kiss in april 1976, Pearl Jam, Backstreet Boys, Bob Dylan, Bryan Adams, Elton John, Genesis, Hilary Duff, INXS, Led Zeppelin, Michael Bublé and The Tragically Hip

It has also been used for Toronto Maple Leafs training camps, and NBA exhibition games.

=== Seating ===
Approximate capacities:

- 7,777 - Hockey
- 7,312 - Basketball
- 8,462 - End stage concert

The Aud features 26 luxury suites and seated full-service restaurant.

=== History ===
The current Aud replaced an earlier facility, the Queen Street Auditorium, at the corner of Charles St., built for $55,000 in 1904. Use of that building ended after a major fire in 1948.

In its early days, the natural ice surface of the old Aud supported hockey, with the first game seeing Berlin trounce Brantford 7-3, in front of an audience of 2,000. Artificial ice was installed in 1927 and this was the home of the Waterloo Siskins, a team formed in 1937. The Kraut line also played at this facility. "It was home to me and it was a palace, as far as I was concerned," Milt Schmidt recalled in 2016. By the time of the Second World War however, when most young men were overseas, so the building was used primarily as a Big band era dance hall. Another factor in this change was that Silverwood Dairies, which had provided the refrigeration for the ice surface, moved to another location in 1938, ending the availability of inexpensive artificial ice. Afterwards, the city was without a large indoor ice surface until the new Aud was built.

=== Renovations ===
In 2008, Kitchener Rangers president Steve Bienkowski stated that the Rangers had begun the process of researching the possibility of building a new arena with larger capacity. The Rangers had sold out almost every game for the previous 3 years, and the waiting list for season tickets had been well over the cap of 4,750. Mr. Bienkowski stated the Rangers would like a building with at least 10,000 seats.

Bienkowski presented the City of Kitchener council a report on expanding the Aud. The expansion would have included another level of seating as well as an expanded concourse. The expansion proposed to add 3,500 seats to the facility to make total seating capacity around 10,500. The estimated cost was $44 million. This expansion option was the favoured route for the team, as it was estimated that a new arena with a larger seating capacity (about 10,000) would cost $150 million. City council made it clear they would not finance such a large project unless private companies were adding money to it but had been very favourable at the idea of expanding the city-owned building. The plan includes raising the roof on the building, a process which had been done before with the Buffalo Memorial Auditorium in the early 1970s.

Bienkowski and the city came to an agreement involving the Aud being expanded by 1,000 seats with a concourse on the third level. The expected cost for this expansion was roughly $9 million, with the Kitchener Rangers Hockey Club paying for it, via a loan from the City of Kitchener. Work began in February 2012 and was completed by the end of that year. Upon completion the seating capacity is 7,234, including about 920 new seats in the regular seating area and 80 new seats in new suites, with a standing room capacity of 7,777.

As of January 2020, talks are underway by the City of Kitchener to move the Kitchener Memorial Auditorium to a new location as the building nears a time when more renovations are required to the facility.

== Centennial Stadium ==
Centennial Stadium (demolished, 2012)
- Interactive map of Centennial Stadium (demolished, 2012)
- Location: Kitchener, Ontario, Canada
- Owner: City of Kitchener
- Capacity: 3,200
- Surface: Grass

Construction
- Opened: 1967

Centennial Stadium was a football/soccer stadium next to The Aud. The stadium seated 3,200 spectators and was the largest stadium in Kitchener.

The stadium was additionally noteworthy for its location with easy highway access from Waterloo, Guelph, and Cambridge and its track and field facilities.

In the spring of 2011, the grandstand at Centennial Stadium was deemed unsafe and ultimately condemned. On June 12, 2012, Kitchener City Council voted 6-4 to demolish the grandstand, it has since been torn down. Jacob Hespeler Secondary school has recently added an artificial turf field as well as an improved track surface, in order to fill the gap that was left after Centennial was demolished.

== Gallery ==
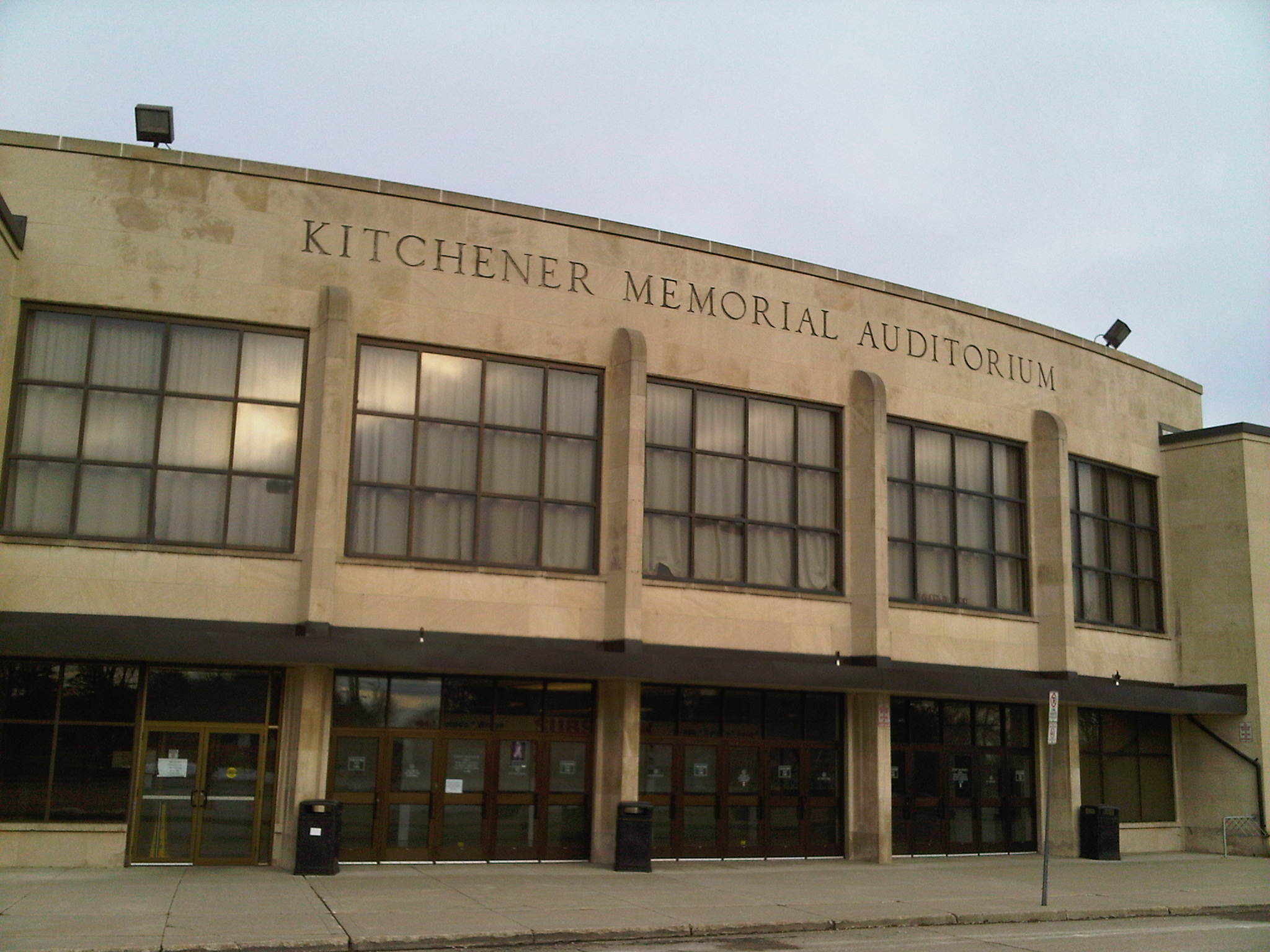
Exterior

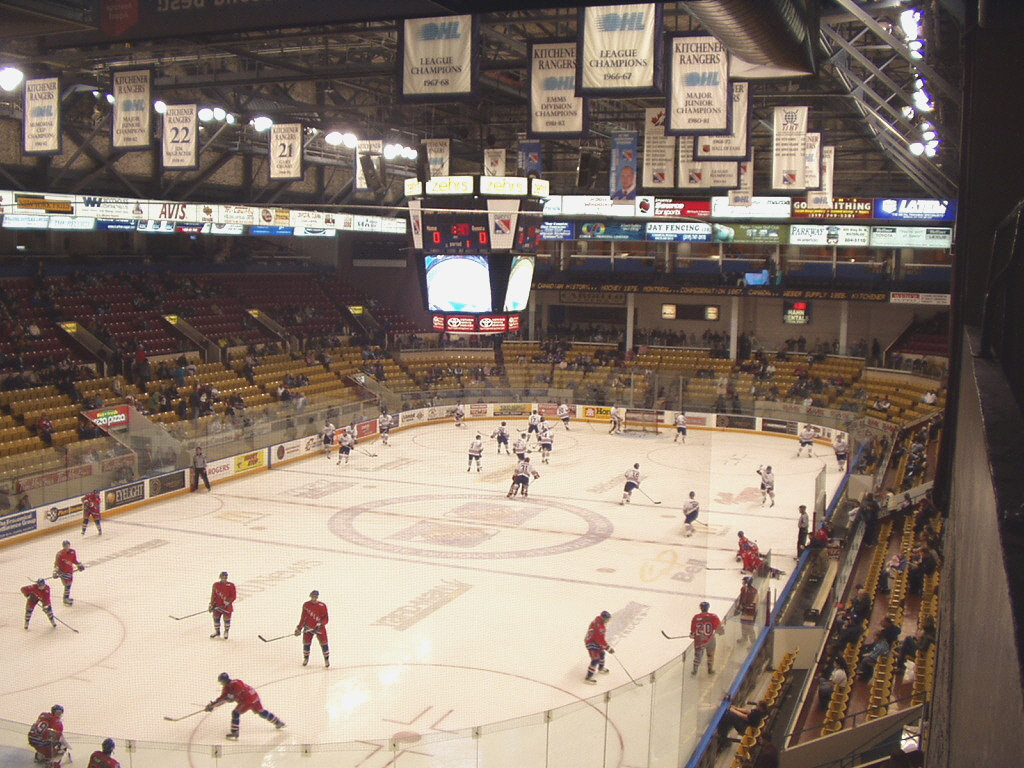
Interior Prior to 2012 Addition

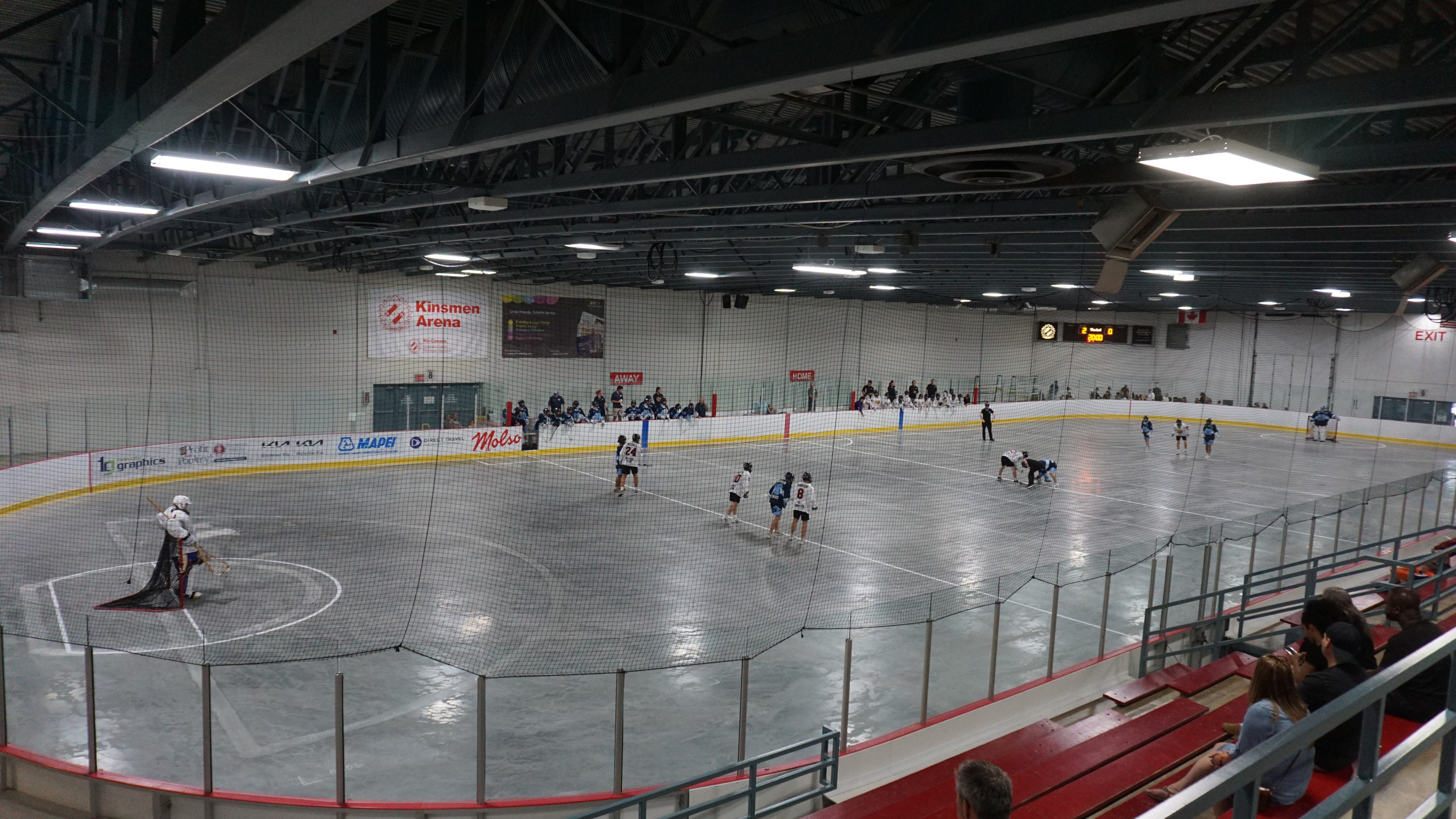
Kinsmen Arena, home to the Kitchener Kodiaks

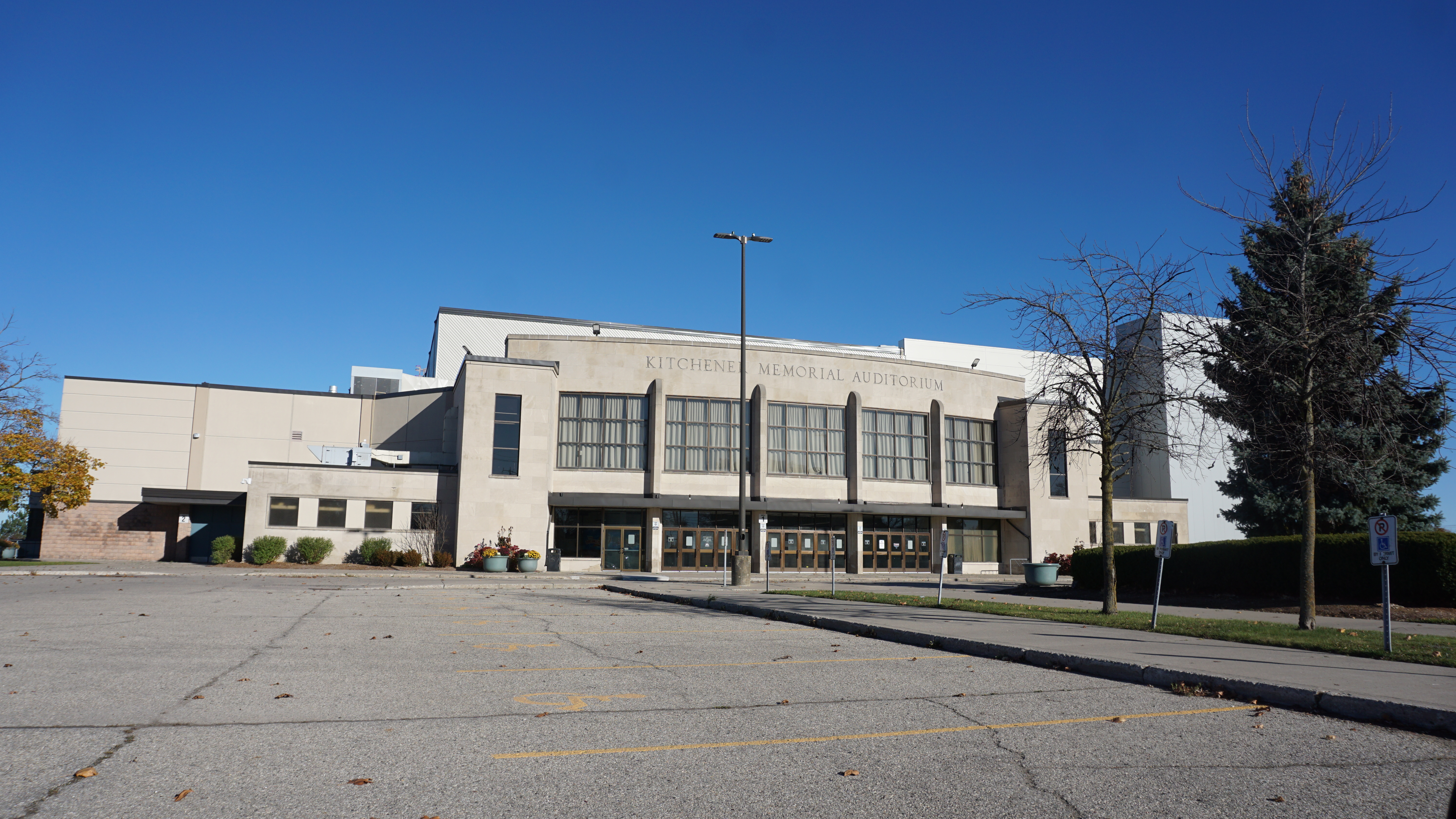
Facade

== See also ==
- List of indoor arenas in Canada
