= Mike Rucinski (ice hockey, born 1975) =

American ice hockey player

- Born: March 30, 1975 (age 51) Trenton, Michigan, U.S.
- Height: 5 ft 11 in (180 cm)
- Weight: 180 lb (82 kg; 12 st 12 lb)
- Position: Defense
- Shot: Left
- Played for: Carolina Hurricanes
- National team: United States
- NHL draft: 217th overall, 1995; Hartford Whalers
- Playing career: 1996–2002

Michael Jason Rucinski (born March 30, 1975) is an American former professional ice hockey player who played in the National Hockey League for the Carolina Hurricanes.

== Early life ==
Rucinski was born in Trenton, Michigan. As a youth, he played in the 1989 Quebec International Pee-Wee Hockey Tournament with the Detroit Little Caesars minor ice hockey team.

== Career ==
Rucinski was drafted 217th by the Hartford Whalers (now Carolina Hurricanes) in the 1995 NHL entry draft and played 26 regular season games for the Hurricanes scoring two assists and collecting ten penalty minutes. In March 2002, Rucinski was traded to the New Jersey Devils for Ted Drury, but never played a game for the Devils, spending his time in the AHL for the Albany River Rats and retired shortly afterwards.

He spent several years as the director of hockey operations at Suburban Ice Arena in East Lansing. He is currently a senior firefighter in Metro Detroit.

== Career statistics ==
=== Regular season and playoffs ===
			Regular season					Playoffs
Season	Team	League	GP	G	A	Pts	PIM	GP	G	A	Pts	PIM
1991–92	Detroit Little Caesars	MNHL	29	4	15	19	38	—	—	—	—	—
1992–93	Detroit Junior Red Wings	OHL	66	6	13	19	59	15	0	4	4	12
1993–94	Detroit Junior Red Wings	OHL	66	2	26	28	58	17	0	7	7	15
1994–95	Detroit Junior Red Wings	OHL	64	9	18	27	61	21	3	3	6	8
1995–96	Detroit Whalers	OHL	51	10	25	35	65	11	2	4	6	14
1996–97	Richmond Renegades	ECHL	61	20	23	43	85	8	2	6	8	18
1996–97	Springfield Falcons	AHL	6	0	1	1	0	—	—	—	—	—
1997–98	Carolina Hurricanes	NHL	9	0	1	1	2	—	—	—	—	—
1997–98	Beast of New Haven	AHL	65	5	17	22	50	1	0	0	0	0
1997–98	Cleveland Lumberjacks	IHL	2	0	0	0	4	—	—	—	—	—
1998–99	Carolina Hurricanes	NHL	15	0	1	1	8	—	—	—	—	—
1998–99	Beast of New Haven	AHL	23	2	6	8	27	—	—	—	—	—
1999–2000	Cincinnati Cyclones	IHL	66	3	10	13	34	11	0	0	0	28
2000–01	Carolina Hurricanes	NHL	2	0	0	0	0	—	—	—	—	—
2000–01	Cincinnati Cyclones	IHL	79	1	22	23	46	5	0	0	0	2
2001–02	Lowell Lock Monsters	AHL	63	5	11	16	33	—	—	—	—	—
2001–02	Albany River Rats	AHL	19	0	2	2	4	—	—	—	—	—
AHL totals			176	12	37	49	114	1	0	0	0	0
NHL totals			26	0	2	2	10	—	—	—	—	—
IHL totals			147	4	32	36	84	16	0	0	0	30

=== International ===
Year	Team	Event	GP	G	A	Pts	PIM
1998	United States	WC Q	3	1	1	2	14
Senior totals			3	1	1	2	14
