= Aaron Brand =

Canadian retired ice hockey center

Aaron Brand (born June 14, 1975) is a Canadian retired ice hockey center. He attended Lambton College, 1994-96. He lives in Sarnia, Canada.

== Junior career ==
Brand had a successful junior career culminating in the 1995–96 OHL season. In that season, he was the league leading scorer, was OHL second team all-star, and was named the league's best overall player. He recorded 46 goals and 119 points during the 1995-96 season, earning the Eddie Powers Memorial Trophy.

He played for Team Canada in the 1997 Maccabiah Games in Israel.

== Professional career ==
Brand never played in the NHL, but played in over 300 games in the American Hockey League for the St. John's Maple Leafs. Brand also spent time in the Austrian Hockey League, International Hockey League (1945–2001), United Hockey League, West Coast Hockey League, and East Coast Hockey League.

== Awards and honours ==
Award	Year
OHL
Leo Lalonde Memorial Trophy	1996
Eddie Powers Memorial Trophy	1996

== Career statistics ==
			Regular season					Playoffs
Season	Team	League	GP	G	A	Pts	PIM	GP	G	A	Pts	PIM
1993–94	Newmarket Hurricanes	OHL	65	19	45	64	55	—	—	—	—	—
1994–95	Sarnia Sting	OHL	66	33	42	75	58	3	0	2	2	4
1995–96	Sarnia Sting	OHL	66	46	73	119	110	10	7	11	18	18
1995–96	St. John's Maple Leafs	AHL	1	0	1	1	0	4	0	0	0	4
1996–97	St. John's Maple Leafs	AHL	75	15	25	40	80	11	3	2	5	2
1997–98	St. John's Maple Leafs	AHL	79	10	21	31	107	4	2	2	4	6
1998–99	St. John's Maple Leafs	AHL	80	7	26	33	88	5	1	2	3	8
1999–2000	St. John's Maple Leafs	AHL	80	12	25	37	68	—	—	—	—	—
2000–01	Arkansas RiverBlades	ECHL	71	29	39	68	66	6	2	6	8	6
2000–01	Cincinnati Cyclones	IHL	1	1	0	1	2	—	—	—	—	—
2001–02	HC Innsbruck	AUT	32	15	27	42	22	4	3	0	3	10
2001–02	Bakersfield Condors	WCHL	10	4	10	14	4	4	0	2	2	6
2002–03	Cincinnati Cyclones	ECHL	72	23	42	65	70	15	4	5	9	12
2003–04	Port Huron Beacons	UHL	72	30	25	55	58	9	3	4	7	10
2004–05	Port Huron Beacons	UHL	80	31	51	82	77	—	—	—	—	—
2005–06	Port Huron Beacons	UHL	43	16	29	45	47	—	—	—	—	—
2007–08	Brantford Blast	MLH	—	—	—	—	—	8	2	2	4	20
2007–08	Brantford Blast	AC	—	—	—	—	—	5	0	3	3	6
2008–09	Brantford Blast	MLH	19	11	19	30	12	—	—	—	—	—
AHL totals			315	44	98	142	343	24	6	6	12	20
UHL totals			195	77	105	182	182	9	3	4	7	10
