= Steve McLaren =

Canadian ice hockey player

- Born: February 3, 1975 (age 50); Owen Sound, Ontario, Canada
- Height: 6 ft 0 in (183 cm)
- Weight: 225 lb (102 kg; 16 st 1 lb)
- Position: Left wing
- Shot: Left
- Played for: St. Louis Blues
- NHL draft: 85th overall, 1994; Chicago Blackhawks
- Playing career: 1995–2005

Steve McLaren (born February 3, 1975) is a Canadian former professional ice hockey winger who played primarily as an enforcer and was a member of the St. Louis Blues in the National Hockey League.

He last played for the Springfield Falcons of the American Hockey League. Known for his physical style of play, McLaren was considered by many to be one of the toughest players in AHL history. McLaren fought and defeated some of the toughest men to play in the American Hockey League, many who went on to have substantial NHL careers. His brief career in the NHL spanned six games, but included a fight and win over Peter Worrell then of the Colorado Avalanche.

== Career statistics ==
			Regular season					Playoffs
Season	Team	League	GP	G	A	Pts	PIM	GP	G	A	Pts	PIM
1992–93	North Bay Trappers	NOJHL	28	4	16	20	18	5	0	3	3	0
1993–94	North Bay Centennials	OHL	55	2	15	17	130	18	0	3	3	50
1994–95	North Bay Centennials	OHL	27	3	10	13	119	6	2	1	3	23
1994–95	South Carolina Stingrays	ECHL	—	—	—	—	—	2	0	0	0	19
1995–96	Indianapolis Ice	IHL	54	1	2	3	370	3	0	0	0	2
1996–97	Indianapolis Ice	IHL	63	2	5	7	309	4	0	0	0	10
1997–98	Indianapolis Ice	IHL	61	3	5	8	208	5	0	0	0	24
1998–99	Philadelphia Phantoms	AHL	52	4	3	7	216	7	0	0	0	2
1999–00	Philadelphia Phantoms	AHL	64	1	2	3	347	—	—	—	—	—
2000–01	Philadelphia Phantoms	AHL	48	3	1	4	377	8	0	0	0	38
2001–02	Worcester IceCats	AHL	58	0	4	4	351	1	0	0	0	2
2002–03	Worcester IceCats	AHL	40	0	0	0	80	3	0	0	0	4
2003–04	Worcester IceCats	AHL	35	2	1	3	146	6	0	0	0	2
2003–04	St. Louis Blues	NHL	6	0	0	0	25	—	—	—	—	—
2004–05	Springfield Falcons	AHL	26	1	0	1	78	—	—	—	—	—
2005–06	Springfield Falcons	AHL	1	0	0	0	2	—	—	—	—	—
NHL totals			6	0	0	0	25	—	—	—	—	—
