= Travis Scott (ice hockey) =

Canadian ice hockey player

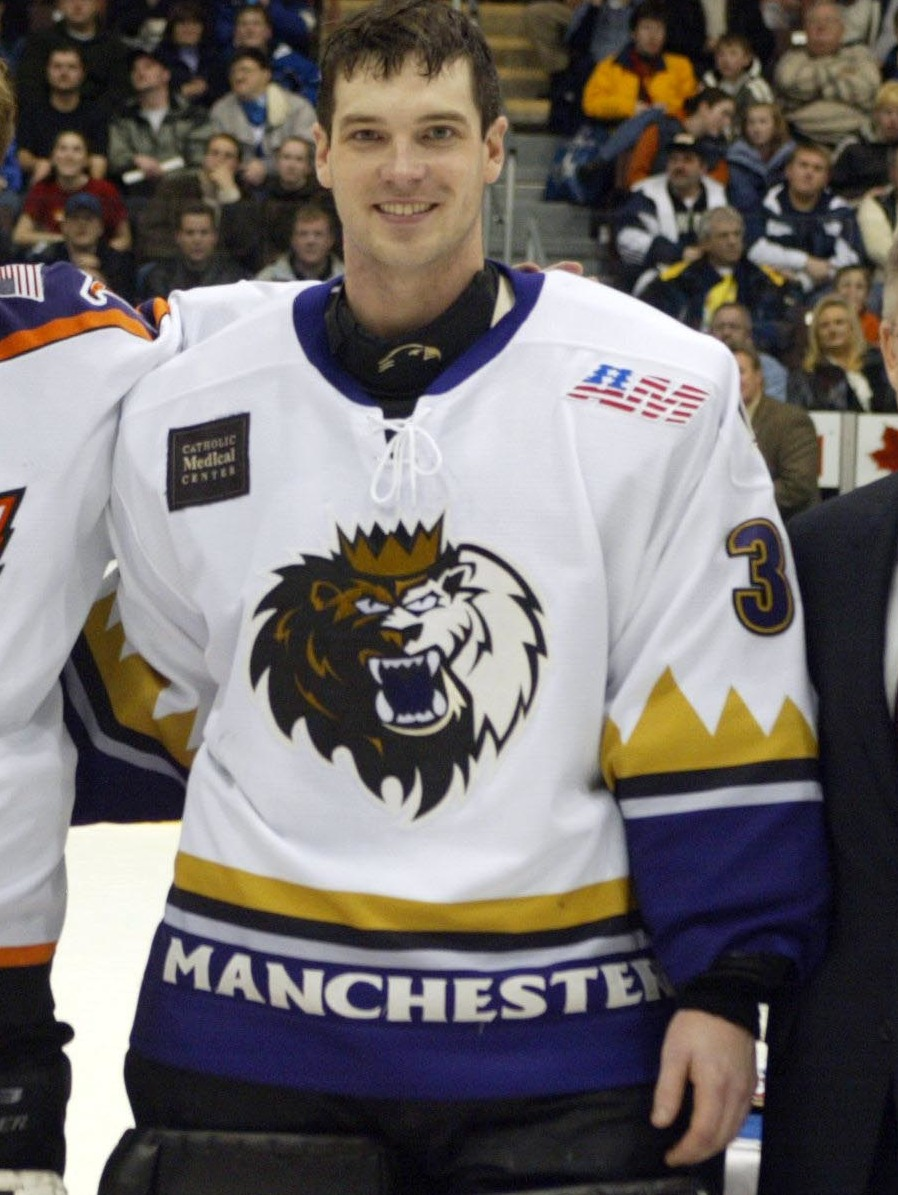
- Scott with the Manchester Monarchs in 2002
- Born: September 14, 1975 (age 50) Kanata, Ontario, Canada
- Height: 6 ft 2 in (188 cm)
- Weight: 185 lb (84 kg; 13 st 3 lb)
- Position: Goaltender
- Caught: Left
- Played for: Los Angeles Kings; Metallurg Magnitogorsk; Kölner Haie; EC KAC; Hannover Scorpions; Traktor Chelyabinsk
- NHL draft: Undrafted
- Playing career: 1996–2011

Travis Scott (born September 14, 1975) is a Canadian former professional ice hockey goaltender who played in one National Hockey League (NHL) game with the Los Angeles Kings during the 2000–01 season. He played most of his first nine professional seasons, from 1996 to 2005, in the American Hockey League (AHL) and East Coast Hockey League (ECHL). He spent the last six seasons of his career, 2005 to 2011, in Europe, playing in the Russian Superleague, the German Deutsche Eishockey Liga, the Austrian Hockey League, and the Kontinental Hockey League (KHL).

== Career statistics ==
=== Regular season and playoffs ===
			Regular season										Playoffs
Season	Team	League	GP	W	L	T	OTL	MIN	GA	SO	GAA	SV%	GP	W	L	MIN	GA	SO	GAA	SV%
1991–92	Nepean Raiders	CJHL	19	14	5	0	—	1065	71	1	4.00	—	—	—	—	—	—	—	—	—
1992–93	Nepean Raiders	CJHL	36	19	10	2	—	1968	133	0	4.05	—	—	—	—	—	—	—	—	—
1993–94	Windsor Spitfires	OHL	45	20	18	0	—	2312	158	1	4.10	.876	—	—	—	—	—	—	—	—
1994–95	Windsor Spitfires	OHL	48	26	14	3	—	2644	147	3	3.34	—	—	—	—	—	—	—	—	—
1995–96	Oshawa Generals	OHL	31	15	9	4	—	1763	78	3	2.65	.922	—	—	—	—	—	—	—	—
1996–97	Baton Rouge Kingfish	ECHL	10	5	2	1	—	501	22	0	2.63	.917	—	—	—	—	—	—	—	—
1996–97	Worcester Ice Cats	AHL	29	14	10	1	—	1482	75	1	3.04	.911	—	—	—	—	—	—	—	—
1997–98	Baton Rouge Kingfish	ECHL	36	14	11	6	—	1949	96	1	2.96	.910	—	—	—	—	—	—	—	—
1998–99	Mississippi Sea Wolves	ECHL	44	22	12	5	—	2337	112	1	2.88	.908	—	—	—	—	—	—	—	—
1999–00	Lowell Lock Monsters	AHL	46	15	23	3	—	2595	126	3	2.91	.912	—	—	—	—	—	—	—	—
2000–01	Los Angeles Kings	NHL	1	0	0	0	—	25	3	0	7.28	.700	—	—	—	—	—	—	—	—
2000–01	Lowell Lock Monsters	AHL	34	16	15	1	—	1977	83	2	2.52	.921	—	—	—	—	—	—	—	—
2001–02	Manchester Monarchs	AHL	39	21	12	3	—	2170	83	6	2.30	.930	—	—	—	—	—	—	—	—
2002–03	Manchester Monarchs	AHL	50	23	19	5	—	2829	116	4	2.46	.921	—	—	—	—	—	—	—	—
2003–04	San Antonio Rampage	AHL	64	26	31	6	—	3747	156	4	2.50	.924	—	—	—	—	—	—	—	—
2004–05	San Antonio Rampage	AHL	59	18	28	4	—	3211	126	3	2.35	.931	—	—	—	—	—	—	—	—
2005–06	Metallurg Magnitogorsk	RSL	43	35	4	—	3	2563	52	11	1.22	.949	—	—	—	—	—	—	—	—
2006–07	Metallurg Magnitogorsk	RSL	45	23	9	—	6	—	—	9	1.61	.938	—	—	—	—	—	—	—	—
2007–08	Kölner Haie	DEL	27	13	6	—	0	1642	60	3	2.19	.926	—	—	—	—	—	—	—	—
2007–08	Metallurg Magnitogorsk	RSL	18	13	5	—	0	—	—	1	1.97	.932	—	—	—	—	—	—	—	—
2008–09	EC KAC	AUT	15	—	—	—	—	—	—	1	2.07	.935	—	—	—	—	—	—	—	—
2009–10	Hannover Scorpions	DEL	29	15	5	—	0	1661	69	0	2.49	.922	—	—	—	—	—	—	—	—
2010–11	Hannover Scorpions	DEL	7	3	4	—	0	389	21	0	3.24	.897	—	—	—	—	—	—	—	—
2010–11	Traktor Chelyabinsk	KHL	14	6	5	—	1	756	43	0	3.41	.865	—	—	—	—	—	—	—	—
NHL totals			1	0	0	0	—	25	3	0	7.28	.700	—	—	—	—	—	—	—	—

== See also ==
- List of players who played only one game in the NHL
