= Marc Moro =

Canadian ice hockey player (born 1977)

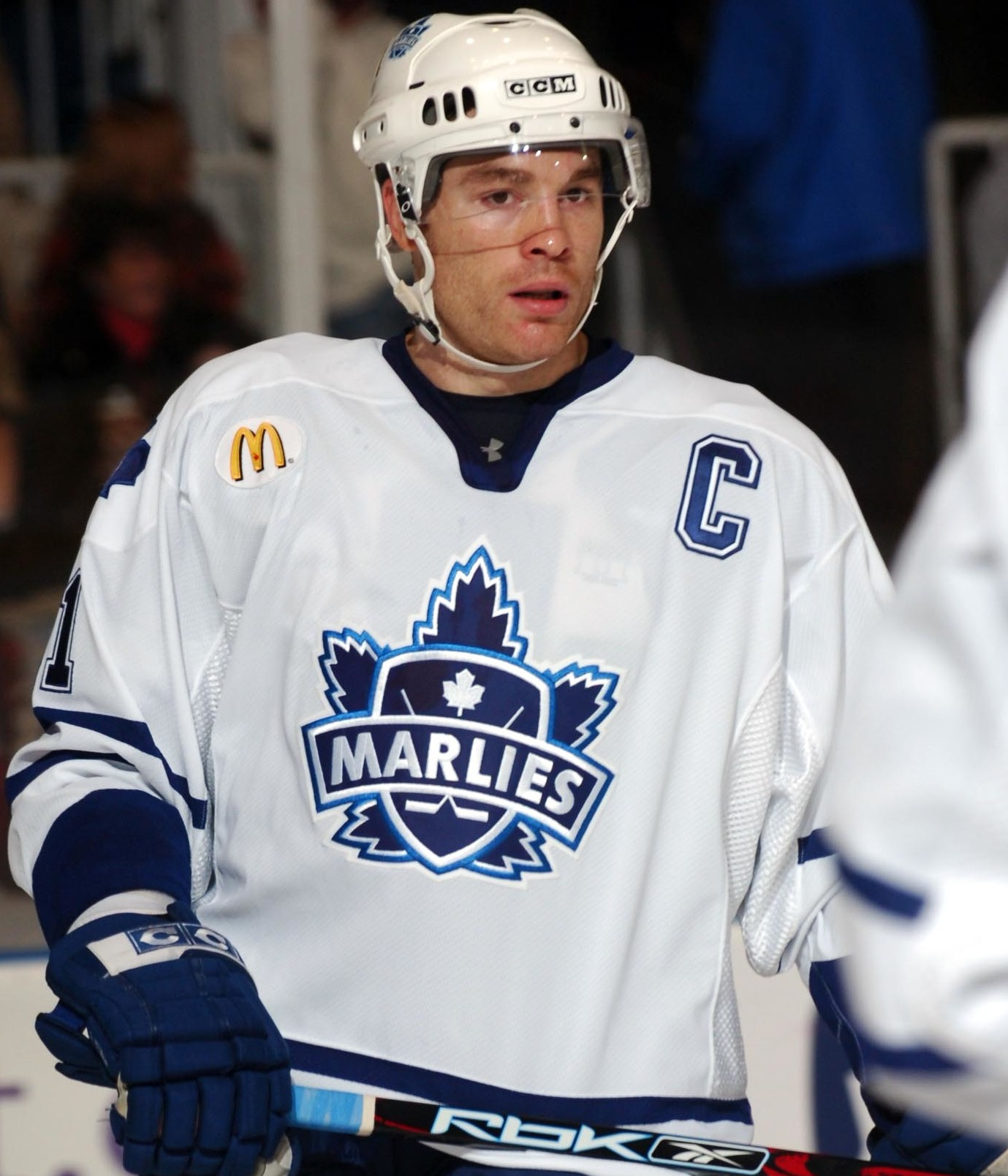
- Moro with the Toronto Marlies in 2006
- Born: July 17, 1977 (age 48) Toronto, Ontario, Canada
- Height: 6 ft 1 in (185 cm)
- Weight: 229 lb (104 kg; 16 st 5 lb)
- Position: Defence
- Shot: Left
- Played for: Mighty Ducks of Anaheim; Nashville Predators; Toronto Maple Leafs
- NHL draft: 27th overall, 1995; Ottawa Senators
- Playing career: 1997–2007

Marc Moro (born July 17, 1977) is a Canadian former professional ice hockey player. He played 30 games in the National Hockey League with the Mighty Ducks of Anaheim, Nashville Predators, and Toronto Maple Leafs from 1997 to 2002. The rest of his career, which lasted from 1997 to 2007, was mainly spent in the minor leagues. He was the first captain for the Toronto Marlies of the American Hockey League. He was drafted in the second round, 27th overall by the Ottawa Senators in the 1995 NHL entry draft.

== Biography ==
As a youth, Moro played in the 1991 Quebec International Pee-Wee Hockey Tournament with a minor ice hockey team from Markham, Ontario.

Moro played junior hockey with the Kingston Frontenacs from 1993 to 1997, and the Sault Ste. Marie Greyhounds for part of the 1996–97 season. He played his first pro hockey game for the Prince Edward Island Senators of the AHL during the 1995–96 season before being sent back to junior.

Moro never played a game in an Ottawa Senators jersey. In 1996, his rights were traded to the Mighty Ducks of Anaheim with Ted Drury for Jason York and Shaun Van Allen. He made his National Hockey League (NHL) debut with the Mighty Ducks, playing in one game during the 1997–98 season. He was dealt the next season with goaltender Chris Mason to the Nashville Predators for goaltender Dominic Roussel.

Moro was selected as the first captain in Toronto Marlies history in October 2005. He was also the St. John's Maple Leafs' last captain in their 15-year history during the 2004–05 AHL season.

On August 13, 2007, Moro announced his retirement. Moro worked as an analyst during Maple Leaf games on Leafs TV during the 2007-08 season, and has since become president of a construction consulting company in Toronto.

== Career statistics ==
=== Regular season and playoffs ===
			Regular season					Playoffs
Season	Team	League	GP	G	A	Pts	PIM	GP	G	A	Pts	PIM
1993–94	Kingston Frontenacs	OHL	43	0	3	3	81	—	—	—	—	—
1994–95	Kingston Frontenacs	OHL	64	4	12	16	255	6	0	0	0	23
1995–96	Kingston Frontenacs	OHL	66	4	17	21	261	6	0	0	0	12
1995–96	Prince Edward Island Senators	AHL	2	0	0	0	7	2	0	0	0	4
1996–97	Kingston Frontenacs	OHL	37	4	8	12	97	—	—	—	—	—
1996–97	Sault Ste. Marie Greyhounds	OHL	26	0	5	5	74	11	1	6	7	38
1997–98	Mighty Ducks of Anaheim	NHL	1	0	0	0	0	—	—	—	—	—
1997–98	Cincinnati Mighty Ducks	AHL	74	1	6	7	181	—	—	—	—	—
1998–99	Milwaukee Admirals	IHL	80	0	5	5	264	2	0	0	0	4
1999–00	Nashville Predators	NHL	8	0	0	0	40	—	—	—	—	—
1999–00	Milwaukee Admirals	IHL	64	5	5	10	203	—	—	—	—	—
2000–01	Nashville Predators	NHL	6	0	0	0	12	—	—	—	—	—
2000–01	Milwaukee Admirals	IHL	68	2	9	11	190	5	1	0	1	10
2001–02	Nashville Predators	NHL	13	0	0	0	23	—	—	—	—	—
2001–02	Toronto Maple Leafs	NHL	2	0	0	0	2	—	—	—	—	—
2001–02	Milwaukee Admirals	AHL	41	1	8	81	—	—	—	—	—
2001–02	St. John's Maple Leafs	AHL	7	1	0	1	21	—	—	—	—	—
2002–03	St. John's Maple Leafs	AHL	68	3	8	11	128	—	—	—	—	—
2003–04	St. John's Maple Leafs	AHL	76	1	9	10	144	—	—	—	—	—
2004–05	St. John's Maple Leafs	AHL	78	2	6	8	202	5	0	1	1	4
2005–06	Toronto Marlies	AHL	73	0	8	8	149	5	0	0	0	11
2006–07	Toronto Marlies	AHL	79	2	5	7	139	—	—	—	—	—
AHL totals			498	11	50	61	1052	12	0	1	1	21
NHL totals			30	0	0	0	77	—	—	—	—	—
