= Sean Haggerty =

American ice hockey player

- Born: February 11, 1976 (age 50) Rye, New York, U.S.
- Height: 6 ft 1 in (185 cm)
- Weight: 186 lb (84 kg; 13 st 4 lb)
- Position: Left wing
- Shot: Left
- Played for: Toronto Maple Leafs; New York Islanders; Nashville Predators
- National team: United States
- NHL draft: 48th overall, 1994; Toronto Maple Leafs
- Playing career: 1996–2002

Sean F. Haggerty (born February 11, 1976) is an American former professional ice hockey left winger. He played 14 games in the National Hockey League with the Toronto Maple Leafs, New York Islanders, and Nashville Predators between 1996 and 2000. The rest of his career, which lasted from 1996 to 2002, was spent in the minor leagues. Internationally, Haggerty played for the American national team at both the junior and senior level, including the 2000 World Championship.

== Early life ==
Haggerty was born in Rye, New York. As a youth, he played in the 1989 and 1990 Quebec International Pee-Wee Hockey Tournaments with a minor ice hockey team from Rye, New York.

== Career ==
Haggerty was drafted in the second round, 48th overall, by the Toronto Maple Leafs in the 1994 NHL entry draft. He played fourteen games in the National Hockey League, one with the Maple Leafs in the 1995–96 season, ten with the New York Islanders over two seasons, and three with the Nashville Predators in the 2000–01 season.

== Career statistics ==
=== Regular season and playoffs ===
			Regular season					Playoffs
Season	Team	League	GP	G	A	Pts	PIM	GP	G	A	Pts	PIM
1990–91	Westminster School	HS-CT	25	20	22	42	—	—	—	—	—	—
1991–92	Westminster School	HS-CT	25	24	36	60	—	—	—	—	—	—
1992–93	Boston Junior Bruins	Ind	72	70	111	181	80	—	—	—	—	—
1993–94	Detroit Junior Red Wings	OHL	60	31	32	63	21	17	9	10	19	11
1994–95	Detroit Junior Red Wings	OHL	61	40	49	89	37	21	13	24	37	18
1994–95	Detroit Junior Red Wings	M-Cup	—	—	—	—	—	5	5	2	7	6
1995–96	Detroit Whalers	OHL	66	60	51	111	78	17	15	9	24	30
1995–96	Toronto Maple Leafs	NHL	1	0	0	0	0	—	—	—	—	—
1995–96	Worcester IceCats	AHL	—	—	—	—	—	1	0	0	0	2
1996–97	Kentucky Thoroughblades	AHL	77	13	22	35	60	4	1	0	1	4
1997–98	New York Islanders	NHL	5	0	0	0	0	—	—	—	—	—
1997–98	Kentucky Thoroughblades	AHL	63	33	20	53	64	3	0	2	2	4
1998–99	Lowell Lock Monsters	AHL	77	19	27	46	40	3	0	1	1	0
1999–00	New York Islanders	NHL	5	1	1	2	4	—	—	—	—	—
1999–00	Kansas City Blades	IHL	76	27	33	60	94	—	—	—	—	—
2000–01	Nashville Predators	NHL	3	0	1	1	0	—	—	—	—	—
2000–01	Milwaukee Admirals	IHL	76	27	23	50	59	5	0	1	1	8
2001–02	Providence Bruins	AHL	69	21	26	47	46	2	0	0	0	4
AHL totals			286	86	95	181	210	13	1	3	4	14
NHL totals			14	1	2	3	4	—	—	—	—	—

=== International ===
Year	Team	Event	GP	G	A	Pts	PIM
1995	United States	WJC	7	1	6	7	8
2000	United States	WC	7	1	1	2	8
Junior totals			7	1	6	7	8
Senior totals			7	1	1	2	8
