= Leo Lalonde Memorial Trophy =

- Sport: Ice hockey
- Awarded for: Best overage player in OHL

History
- First award: 1984
- Most recent: Jack Pridham

The Leo Lalonde Memorial Trophy is awarded each year to the best overage player in the Ontario Hockey League, as selected by the teams' general managers. The trophy was donated by the trainers of the league in memory of Leo Lalonde, former chief scout of the Belleville Bulls and Peterborough Petes.

== Winners ==
List of recipients of the Leo Lalonde Memorial Trophy.

Season	Winner	Team
1983–84	Don McLaren	Ottawa 67's
1984–85	Dunc MacIntyre	Belleville Bulls
1985–86	Steve Guenette	Guelph Platers
1986–87	Mike Richard	Toronto Marlboros
1987–88	Len Soccio	North Bay Centennials
1988–89	Stan Drulia	Niagara Falls Thunder
1989–90	Iain Fraser	Oshawa Generals
1990–91	Joey St. Aubin	Kitchener Rangers
1991–92	John Spoltore	North Bay Centennials
1992–93	Scott Hollis	Oshawa Generals
1993–94	B. J. MacPherson	North Bay Centennials
1994–95	Bill Bowler	Windsor Spitfires
1995–96	Aaron Brand	Sarnia Sting
1996–97	Zac Bierk	Peterborough Petes
1997–98	Bujar Amidovski	Toronto St. Michael's Majors
1998–99	Ryan Ready	Belleville Bulls
1999–2000	Dan Tessier	Ottawa 67's
2000–01	Randy Rowe	Belleville Bulls
2001–02	Cory Pecker	Erie Otters
2002–03	Chad LaRose	Plymouth Whalers
2003–04	Martin St. Pierre	Guelph Storm
2004–05	André Benoit	Kitchener Rangers
2005–06	Ryan Callahan	Guelph Storm
2006–07	Tyler Donati	Belleville Bulls
2007–08	Michael Swift	Niagara IceDogs
2008–09	Justin DiBenedetto	Sarnia Sting
2009–10	Bryan Cameron	Barrie Colts
2010–11	Jason Akeson	Kitchener Rangers
2011–12	Andrew Agozzino	Niagara IceDogs
2012–13	Charles Sarault	Sarnia Sting
2013–14	Dane Fox	Erie Otters
2014–15	Joseph Blandisi	Barrie Colts
2015–16	Kevin Labanc	Barrie Colts
2016–17	Darren Raddysh	Erie Otters
2017–18	Aaron Luchuk	Windsor/Barrie
2018–19	Justin Brazeau	North Bay Battalion
2019–20	Austen Keating	Ottawa 67's
2020-21	Not awarded, season cancelled due to COVID-19 pandemic	
2021–22	Brandon Coe	North Bay Battalion
2022–23	Matthew Maggio	Windsor Spitfires
2023–24	Matthew Sop	Kitchener Rangers
2024–25	Jackson Parsons	Kitchener Rangers
2025–26	Jack Pridham	Kitchener Rangers

== See also ==
- List of Canadian Hockey League awards
