= 1995–96 OHL season =

Junior ice hockey season

The 1995–96 OHL season was the 16th season of the Ontario Hockey League. The league expanded as the Barrie Colts entered into the central division. The Detroit Junior Red Wings become the Detroit Whalers. Seventeen teams each played 66 games. The Peterborough Petes won the J. Ross Robertson Cup, defeating the Guelph Storm.

== Expansion ==
=== Barrie Colts ===
On May 6, 1994, The Barrie Colts were approved as an expansion team in the Ontario Hockey League beginning in the 1995-96 season. The Colts began their inaugural season playing in the Barrie Arena, however, on December 31, 1995, the Colts moved into their new home, the Barrie Molson Centre. The Colts joined the Central Division.

== Rebranding ==
=== Detroit Junior Red Wings to Detroit Whalers ===
At the conclusion of the 1994-95, the Detroit Junior Red Wings severed all ties with the National Hockey League Detroit Red Wings, as Peter Karmanos renamed the franchise the Detroit Whalers.

The Whalers moved out of Joe Louis Arena and into the Palace of Auburn Hills, home of the Detroit Pistons of the National Basketball Association and the Detroit Vipers of the International Hockey League. The Whalers would play 21 of their 33 home games in the regular season at the Palace of Auburn Hills while playing their remaining 12 home games at Oak Park Ice Arena. The Whalers played all of their home playoff games at the Oak Park Ice Arena.

The club remained in the West Division.

== Regular season ==
=== Final standings ===
Note: DIV = Division; GP = Games played; W = Wins; L = Losses; T = Ties; OTL = Overtime losses; GF = Goals for; GA = Goals against; PTS = Points; x = clinched playoff berth; y = clinched division title; z = earned first round bye

=== East Division ===
Rank	Team	GP	W	L	T	PTS	GF	GA
1	z-Ottawa 67's	66	39	22	5	83	258	200
2	x-Peterborough Petes	66	35	22	9	79	289	235
3	x-Belleville Bulls	66	35	26	5	75	300	250
4	x-Oshawa Generals	66	30	28	8	68	248	238
5	x-Kingston Frontenacs	66	29	31	6	64	266	267
6	North Bay Centennials	66	14	45	7	35	242	360

=== Central Division ===
Rank	Team	GP	W	L	T	PTS	GF	GA
1	z-Guelph Storm	66	45	16	5	95	297	186
2	x-Kitchener Rangers	66	35	28	3	73	253	230
3	x-Niagara Falls Thunder	66	29	30	7	65	248	238
4	x-Owen Sound Platers	66	29	32	5	63	274	313
5	x-Barrie Colts	66	28	31	7	63	258	266
6	Sudbury Wolves	66	27	36	3	59	262	288

=== West Division ===
Rank	Team	GP	W	L	T	PTS	GF	GA
1	y-Detroit Whalers	66	40	22	4	84	319	243
2	x-Sarnia Sting	66	39	23	4	82	330	276
3	x-Sault Ste. Marie Greyhounds	66	38	23	5	81	312	254
4	x-Windsor Spitfires	66	21	41	4	46	256	312
5	London Knights	66	3	60	3	9	179	435

=== Scoring leaders ===
Player	Team	GP	G	A	Pts	PIM
Aaron Brand	Sarnia Sting	66	46	73	119	110
Daniel Cleary	Belleville Bulls	64	53	62	115	74
Sean Haggerty	Detroit Whalers	66	60	51	111	78
Trevor Gallant	North Bay Centennials	63	47	58	105	36
Richard Uniacke	Sault Ste. Marie Greyhounds	66	48	54	102	38
Cameron Mann	Peterborough Petes	66	42	60	102	108
Jonathan Sim	Sarnia Sting	63	56	45	101	130
Trevor Letowski	Sarnia Sting	66	36	63	99	66
Lee Jinman	North Bay Centennials//Detroit Whalers	64	29	68	97	49
Rob Shearer	Windsor Spitfires	63	40	53	93	74

== Playoffs ==
Division quarterfinals
C1	Guelph	bye
C3	Niagara Falls	4
C4	Owen Sound	2
E1	Ottawa	bye
E3	Belleville	4
E4	Oshawa	1
E2	Peterborough	4
E5	Kingston	1
W2	Sarnia	4
W3	S.S. Marie	0
C2	Kitchener	4
C5	Barrie	3
W4	Windsor	3
W1	Detroit	4

Quarterfinals
C1	Guelph	4
C3	Niagara Falls	0
E1	Ottawa	0
E3	Belleville	4
E2	Peterborough	4
W2	Sarnia	2
C2	Kitchener	1
W1	Detroit	4

Semifinals
C1	Guelph	4
E3	Belleville	1
E2	Peterborough	4
W1	Detroit	1

Finals
C1	Guelph	3
E2	Peterborough	4

=== Division quarter-finals ===
==== East Division ====
===== (2) Peterborough Petes vs. (5) Kingston Frontenacs =====
March 17	Peterborough Petes	4 – 5	OT	Kingston Frontenacs	Kingston Memorial Centre

March 19	Kingston Frontenacs	1 – 9	Peterborough Petes	Peterborough Memorial Centre

March 21	Kingston Frontenacs	4 – 3	OT	Peterborough Petes	Peterborough Memorial Centre

March 22	Peterborough Petes	3 – 1	Kingston Frontenacs	Kingston Memorial Centre

March 24	Kingston Frontenacs	3 – 6	Peterborough Petes	Peterborough Memorial Centre

March 26	Peterborough Petes	4 – 3	Kingston Frontenacs	Kingston Memorial Centre

Peterborough wins series 4 – 2

===== (3) Belleville Bulls vs. (4) Oshawa Generals =====
March 16	Oshawa Generals	3 – 6	Belleville Bulls	Yardmen Arena

March 17	Belleville Bulls	1 – 4	Oshawa Generals	Oshawa Civic Auditorium

March 19	Oshawa Generals	3 – 4	OT	Belleville Bulls	Yardmen Arena

March 21	Belleville Bulls	6 – 5	Oshawa Generals	Oshawa Civic Auditorium

March 23	Oshawa Generals	1 – 6	Belleville Bulls	Yardmen Arena

Belleville wins series 4 – 1

==== Central Division ====
===== (2) Kitchener Rangers vs. (5) Barrie Colts =====
March 17	Barrie Colts	2 – 1	Kitchener Rangers	Kitchener Memorial Auditorium

March 19	Kitchener Rangers	1 – 2	OT	Barrie Colts	Barrie Molson Centre

March 21	Barrie Colts	1 – 6	Kitchener Rangers	Kitchener Memorial Auditorium

March 23	Kitchener Rangers	1 – 2	OT	Barrie Colts	Barrie Molson Centre

March 24	Barrie Colts	4 – 7	Kitchener Rangers	Kitchener Memorial Auditorium

March 26	Kitchener Rangers	4 – 1	Barrie Colts	Barrie Molson Centre

March 27	Barrie Colts	3 – 4	Kitchener Rangers	Kitchener Memorial Auditorium

Kitchener wins series 4 – 3

===== (3) Niagara Falls Thunder vs. (4) Owen Sound Platers =====
March 17	Owen Sound Platers	3 – 6	Niagara Falls Thunder	Niagara Falls Memorial Arena

March 20	Niagara Falls Thunder	4 – 7	Owen Sound Platers	Bayshore Community Centre

March 22	Owen Sound Platers	3 – 7	Niagara Falls Thunder	Niagara Falls Memorial Arena

March 23	Niagara Falls Thunder	2 – 3	Owen Sound Platers	Bayshore Community Centre

March 25	Owen Sound Platers	1 – 6	Niagara Falls Thunder	Niagara Falls Memorial Arena

March 27	Niagara Falls Thunder	4 – 3	OT	Owen Sound Platers	Bayshore Community Centre

Niagara Falls wins series 4 – 2

==== West Division ====
===== (1) Detroit Whalers vs. (4) Windsor Spitfires =====
March 17	Windsor Spitfires	3 – 5	Detroit Whalers	Oak Park Ice Arena

March 18	Detroit Whalers	5 – 2	Windsor Spitfires	Windsor Arena

March 20	Windsor Spitfires	4 – 6	Detroit Whalers	Oak Park Ice Arena

March 22	Detroit Whalers	1 – 4	Windsor Spitfires	Windsor Arena

March 24	Windsor Spitfires	5 – 1	Detroit Whalers	Oak Park Ice Arena

March 25	Detroit Whalers	3 – 6	Windsor Spitfires	Windsor Arena

March 27	Windsor Spitfires	2 – 9	Detroit Whalers	Oak Park Ice Arena

Detroit wins series 4 – 3

===== (2) Sarnia Sting vs. (3) Sault Ste. Marie Greyhounds =====
March 17	Sault Ste. Marie Greyhounds	1 – 5	Sarnia Sting	Sarnia Arena

March 18	Sault Ste. Marie Greyhounds	2 – 6	Sarnia Sting	Sarnia Arena

March 20	Sarnia Sting	4 – 1	Sault Ste. Marie Greyhounds	Sault Memorial Gardens

March 21	Sarnia Sting	3 – 1	Sault Ste. Marie Greyhounds	Sault Memorial Gardens

Sarnia wins series 4 – 0

=== OHL quarter-finals ===
==== (C1) Guelph Storm vs. (C3) Niagara Falls Thunder ====
March 29	Niagara Falls Thunder	4 – 5	OT	Guelph Storm	Guelph Memorial Gardens

March 31	Guelph Storm	4 – 3	Niagara Falls Thunder	Niagara Falls Memorial Arena

April 2	Niagara Falls Thunder	2 – 4	Guelph Storm	Guelph Memorial Gardens

April 5	Guelph Storm	5 – 2	Niagara Falls Thunder	Niagara Falls Memorial Arena

Guelph wins series 4 – 0

==== (W1) Detroit Whalers vs. (C2) Kitchener Rangers ====
March 30	Kitchener Rangers	2 – 6	Detroit Whalers	Oak Park Ice Arena

March 31	Detroit Whalers	2 – 5	Kitchener Rangers	Kitchener Memorial Auditorium

April 3	Kitchener Rangers	3 – 5	Detroit Whalers	Oak Park Ice Arena

April 5	Detroit Whalers	5 – 0	Kitchener Rangers	Kitchener Memorial Auditorium

April 6	Kitchener Rangers	1 – 9	Detroit Whalers	Oak Park Ice Arena

Detroit wins series 4 – 1

==== (E1) Ottawa 67's vs. (E3) Belleville Bulls ====
March 29	Belleville Bulls	7 – 4	Ottawa 67's	Ottawa Civic Centre

March 30	Ottawa 67's	3 – 6	Belleville Bulls	Yardmen Arena

April 2	Belleville Bulls	8 – 2	Ottawa 67's	Ottawa Civic Centre

April 4	Ottawa 67's	2 – 5	Belleville Bulls	Yardmen Arena

Belleville wins series 4 – 0

==== (W2) Sarnia Sting vs. (E2) Peterborough Petes ====
March 31	Peterborough Petes	1 – 7	Sarnia Sting	Sarnia Arena

April 1	Peterborough Petes	7 – 4	Sarnia Sting	Sarnia Arena

April 4	Sarnia Sting	1 – 5	Peterborough Petes	Peterborough Memorial Centre

April 5	Sarnia Sting	5 – 1	Peterborough Petes	Peterborough Memorial Centre

April 7	Peterborough Petes	7 – 6	OT	Sarnia Sting	Sarnia Arena

April 9	Sarnia Sting	4 – 7	Peterborough Petes	Peterborough Memorial Centre

Peterborough wins series 4 – 2

=== OHL semi-finals ===
==== (C1) Guelph Storm vs. (E3) Belleville Bulls ====
April 12	Belleville Bulls	0 – 7	Guelph Storm	Guelph Memorial Gardens

April 15	Guelph Storm	5 – 3	Belleville Bulls	Yardmen Arena

April 17	Belleville Bulls	1 – 3	Guelph Storm	Guelph Memorial Gardens

April 19	Guelph Storm	5 – 7	Belleville Bulls	Yardmen Arena

April 21	Belleville Bulls	2 – 6	Guelph Storm	Guelph Memorial Gardens

Guelph wins series 4 – 1

==== (W1) Detroit Whalers vs. (E2) Peterborough Petes ====
April 13	Peterborough Petes	7 – 4	Detroit Whalers	Oak Park Ice Arena

April 14	Peterborough Petes	4 – 3	OT	Detroit Whalers	Oak Park Ice Arena

April 17	Detroit Whalers	3 – 4	OT	Peterborough Petes	Peterborough Memorial Centre

April 18	Detroit Whalers	8 – 4	Peterborough Petes	Peterborough Memorial Centre

April 20	Peterborough Petes	3 – 2	Detroit Whalers	Oak Park Ice Arena

Peterborough wins series 4 – 1

=== J. Ross Robertson Cup ===
==== (C1) Guelph Storm vs. (E2) Peterborough Petes ====
April 25	Guelph Storm	3 – 0	Peterborough Petes	Peterborough Memorial Centre

April 26	Peterborough Petes	6 – 5	OT	Guelph Storm	Guelph Memorial Gardens

April 28	Peterborough Petes	3 – 2	Guelph Storm	Guelph Memorial Gardens

April 30	Guelph Storm	5 – 3	Peterborough Petes	Peterborough Memorial Centre

May 2	Peterborough Petes	5 – 3	Guelph Storm	Guelph Memorial Gardens

May 4	Guelph Storm	4 – 3	Peterborough Petes	Peterborough Memorial Centre

May 6	Peterborough Petes	8 – 7	OT	Guelph Storm	Guelph Memorial Gardens

Peterborough wins series 4 – 3

== All-Star teams ==
=== First team ===
- Alyn McCauley, Centre, Ottawa 67's
- Daniel Cleary, Left Wing, Belleville Bulls
- Cameron Mann, Right Wing, Peterborough Petes
- Bryan Berard, Defence, Detroit Whalers
- Kevin Bolibruck, Defence, Peterborough Petes
- Craig Hillier, Goaltender, Ottawa 67's
- Brian Kilrea, Coach, Ottawa 67's

=== Second team ===
- Aaron Brand, Centre, Sarnia Sting
- Sean Haggerty, Left Wing, Detroit Whalers
- Jeff Johnstone, Right Wing, Niagara Falls Thunder
- Sean Brown, Defence, Sarnia Sting
- Jay McKee, Defence, Niagara Falls Thunder
- Dan Cloutier, Goaltender, Guelph Storm
- Bert Templeton, Coach, Barrie Colts

=== Third team ===
- Sean Venedam, Centre, Sudbury Wolves
- Jamie Wright, Left Wing, Guelph Storm
- David Nemirovski, Right Wing, Sarnia Sting
- Marc Moro, Defence, Kingston Frontenacs
- Ryan Risidore, Defence, Guelph Storm
- David Belitski, Goaltender, Kitchener Rangers
- Travis Scott, Goaltender, Oshawa Generals
- Mark Hunter, Coach, Sarnia Sting

== Awards ==
J. Ross Robertson Cup:	Peterborough Petes
Hamilton Spectator Trophy:	Guelph Storm
Leyden Trophy:	Ottawa 67's
Emms Trophy:	Guelph Storm
Bumbacco Trophy:	Detroit Whalers
Red Tilson Trophy:	Alyn McCauley, Ottawa 67's
Eddie Powers Memorial Trophy:	Aaron Brand, Sarnia Sting
Matt Leyden Trophy:	Brian Kilrea, Ottawa 67's
Jim Mahon Memorial Trophy:	Cameron Mann, Peterborough Petes
Max Kaminsky Trophy:	Bryan Berard, Detroit Whalers
OHL Goaltender of the Year:	Craig Hillier, Ottawa 67's
Jack Ferguson Award:	Rico Fata, London Knights
Dave Pinkney Trophy:	Dan Cloutier and Brett Thompson, Guelph Storm
OHL Executive of the Year:	Bert Templeton, Barrie Colts
Emms Family Award:	Joe Thornton, Sault Ste. Marie Greyhounds
F.W. 'Dinty' Moore Trophy:	Brett Thompson, Guelph Storm
OHL Humanitarian of the Year:	Craig Mills, Belleville Bulls
William Hanley Trophy:	Jeff Williams, Guelph Storm
Leo Lalonde Memorial Trophy:	Aaron Brand, Sarnia Sting
Bobby Smith Trophy:	Boyd Devereaux, Kitchener Rangers

== 1996 OHL Priority Selection ==
On June 1, 1996, the OHL conducted the 1996 Ontario Hockey League Priority Selection at the Kitchener Memorial Auditorium in Kitchener, Ontario. The London Knights held the first overall pick in the draft and selected Rico Fata from the Sault Ste. Marie Greyhounds. Fata was awarded the Jack Ferguson Award, awarded to the top pick in the draft.

Below are the players who were selected in the first round of the 1996 Ontario Hockey League Priority Selection.

#	Player	Nationality	OHL Team	Hometown	Minor Team
1	Rico Fata (C)	Canada	London Knights	Sault Ste. Marie, Ontario	Sault Ste. Marie Greyhounds
2	Tyler Rennette (C)	Canada	North Bay Centennials	Powassan, Ontario	Waterloo Siskins
3	Norm Milley (RW)	Canada	Sudbury Wolves	North York, Ontario	Toronto Red Wings
4	Kip Brennan (D)	Canada	Windsor Spitfires	Toronto, Ontario	St. Michael's Buzzers
5	Mike Henrich (RW)	Canada	Barrie Colts	Thornhill, Ontario	Wexford Midgets
6	Wes Goldie (RW)	Canada	Owen Sound Platers	London, Ontario	St. Thomas Stars
7	Kevin Grimes (D)	Canada	Kingston Frontenacs	Metcalfe, Ontario	Cumberland Grads
8	Brett Gibson (C)	Canada	Erie Otters	Gananoque, Ontario	Kingston Voyageurs
9	Bryan Allen (D)	Canada	Oshawa Generals	Glenburnie, Ontario	Ernestown Jets
10	Wes Jarvis (D)	Canada	Kitchener Rangers	Ottawa, Ontario	Gloucester Rangers
11	Justin Papineau (C)	Canada	Belleville Bulls	Ottawa, Ontario	Ottawa Jr. Senators
12	Pat Kavanagh (RW)	Canada	Peterborough Petes	Richmond, Ontario	Kanata Valley Lasers
13	Nick Robinson (D)	Canada	Sault Ste. Marie Greyhounds	Cavan, Ontario	Lindsay Muskies
14	Abe Herbst (D)	Canada	Sarnia Sting	Harriston, Ontario	Listowel Cyclones
15	Mark Bell (C)	Canada	Ottawa 67's	St. Paul's, Ontario	Stratford Cullitons
16	Harold Druken (LW)	Canada	Detroit Whalers	St. John's, Newfoundland	Noble & Greenough Bulldogs
17	Manny Malhotra (C)	Canada	Guelph Storm	Mississauga, Ontario	Mississauga Reps

== See also ==
- List of OHA Junior A standings
- List of OHL seasons
- 1996 Memorial Cup
- 1996 NHL entry draft
- 1995 in sports
- 1996 in sports

Preceded by 1994–95 OHL season	OHL seasons	Succeeded by 1996–97 OHL season
