= Bill Bowler =

Canadian ice hockey player

- Born: September 25, 1974 (age 51) Toronto, Ontario, Canada
- Height: 5 ft 9 in (175 cm)
- Weight: 180 lb (82 kg; 12 st 12 lb)
- Position: Centre
- Shot: Left
- Played for: Columbus Blue Jackets; Krefeld Pinguine
- NHL draft: Undrafted
- Playing career: 1995–2003

William J. Bowler (born September 25, 1974) is a Canadian former professional ice hockey centre. He played nine games in the National Hockey League with the Columbus Blue Jackets during the 2000–01 season. The rest of his career, which lasted from 1995 to 2003, was spent in the minor leagues. He is currently the General Manager of the Windsor Spitfires in the Ontario Hockey League.

== Biography ==
As a youth, Bowler played in the 1988 Quebec International Pee-Wee Hockey Tournament with a minor ice hockey team from Mississauga.

In 1994–95, while playing for the Ontario Hockey League's Windsor Spitfires, Bowler was awarded the Leo Lalonde Memorial Trophy as the best overage player in the league. During four seasons with the Windsor Spitfires, from the 1991-92 season to the 1994–95 season, Bill Bowler set a franchise record for most career points, with 467 points. He also set the OHL record for most career assists, with 318. As of 2016, both records still stand. On December 10, 2011, Bowler's number 9 was retired by the Windsor Spitfires - he was the eighth player in Windsor Spitfire history to have his jersey hung from the rafters.

In 1995, Bowler was charged with sexual assault alongside Spitfires teammates Ed Jovanowski and Cory Evans. The charges were later dismissed.

Bowler played nine games with the Columbus Blue Jackets in the 2000–01 season, recording two assists. In 2000–01, Bowler set a team record for the AHL's Syracuse Crunch with 58 assists, and tied the team record with 79 points (set in 1995–96 by Lonny Bohonos. This record would be later be broken by Carter Verhaeghe in the 2018-19 season).

Bowler also played professionally in the International Hockey League, and the Deutsche Eishockey Liga.

In 2015, Bowler entered his third season as general manager and head coach of the LaSalle Vipers. He had previously served as the general manager and head coach of the Chatham Maroons for two seasons.

In July 2019, it was announced Bowler would take over for Warren Rychel as General Manager of the Windsor Spitfires for the 2019-20 season.

== Career statistics ==
=== Regular season and playoffs ===
			Regular season					Playoffs
Season	Team	League	GP	G	A	Pts	PIM	GP	G	A	Pts	PIM
1990–91	Toronto Red Wings U18	GTHL	69	58	99	157	—	—	—	—	—	—
1991–92	Windsor Spitfires	OHL	66	25	63	88	28	7	2	3	5	13
1992–93	Windsor Spitfires	OHL	57	44	77	121	41	—	—	—	—	—
1993–94	Windsor Spitfires	OHL	66	47	76	123	39	—	—	—	—	—
1994–95	Windsor Spitfires	OHL	61	33	102	135	63	10	7	15	22	13
1994–95	Las Vegas Thunder	IHL	—	—	—	—	—	1	0	0	0	0
1995–96	Las Vegas Thunder	IHL	75	31	55	86	26	14	3	5	8	22
1996–97	Houston Aeros	IHL	78	22	43	65	79	13	2	5	7	6
1997–98	Hamilton Bulldogs	AHL	46	7	24	31	22	—	—	—	—	—
1997–98	Manitoba Moose	IHL	30	9	26	35	30	3	0	2	2	4
1998–99	Manitoba Moose	IHL	82	26	67	93	59	5	6	5	11	6
1999–00	Manitoba Moose	IHL	75	20	42	62	59	2	1	2	3	6
2000–01	Columbus Blue Jackets	NHL	9	0	2	2	8	—	—	—	—	—
2000–01	Syracuse Crunch	AHL	72	21	58	79	50	4	1	3	4	2
2001–02	Milwaukee Admirals	AHL	17	2	5	7	6	—	—	—	—	—
2001–02	Norfolk Admirals	AHL	28	3	16	19	35	—	—	—	—	—
2002–03	Krefeld Pinguine	DEL	7	1	2	3	4	14	1	1	2	12
IHL totals			340	108	232	341	253	38	12	19	31	44
NHL totals			9	0	2	2	8	—	—	—	—	—
