= Mike Kelly (ice hockey) =

Canadian ice hockey coach and executive (born 1960)

Mike Kelly (born January 17, 1960) is a Canadian ice hockey coach and executive.

After an amateur playing career with the Fredericton-based UNB Varsity Reds of the Canadian Intercollegiate Athletic Union, Kelly joined the Ontario Hockey League's (OHL) London Knights as an assistant coach in 1988. He eventually became the head coach of the OHL's Windsor Spitfires in 1994. He returned to UNB in 1996 as head coach, where he led the team to a University Cup appearance in 1997 and won it in 1998. He returned to the OHL as a head coach of the North Bay Centennials from 1998 to 2002. He also had coaching roles with the Canadian junior national teams from 2000 to 2003. He spent one season as head coach of the Brandon Wheat Kings in the Western Hockey League in 2003–04.

In 2005, he moved on to professional teams working as an assistant coach under Alain Vigneault with the Manitoba Moose of the American Hockey League, the affiliate of the National Hockey League's (NHL) Vancouver Canucks. Kelly was then promoted to the same role with the Canucks when Vigneault became head coach before the 2006–07 season and then left in 2008.

Kelly then served as an associate coach under Gerard Gallant with the Saint John Sea Dogs of the Quebec Major Junior Hockey League (QMJHL) from 2009 to 2012, in which the Sea Dogs became the first QMJHL team to have three 50-win regular seasons in a row and the first team to bring a Memorial Cup title to the Maritimes. Kelly won the 2010–11 Maurice Filion Trophy as the QMJHL general manager of the year. After Gallant left, he became the head coach and general manager for the Sea Dogs for the 2012–13 QMJHL season. Kelly was released by the Sea Dogs early into the 2013–14 season.

Kelly was hired onto Gallant's staff with the Florida Panthers in 2014 and was fired along with Gallant in 2016. He followed Gallant as an assistant with the Vegas Golden Knights NHL expansion team in 2017, but was fired with Gallant again on January 15, 2020.
