= Dave Roche =

Canadian ice hockey player

- Born: June 13, 1975 (age 50) Lindsay, Ontario, Canada
- Height: 6 ft 4 in (193 cm)
- Weight: 230 lb (104 kg; 16 st 6 lb)
- Position: Left wing
- Shot: Left
- Played for: Pittsburgh Penguins; Calgary Flames; New York Islanders
- NHL draft: 62nd overall, 1993; Pittsburgh Penguins
- Playing career: 1995–2004

David Roche (born June 13, 1975) is a Canadian former ice hockey player who played in the National Hockey League for the Pittsburgh Penguins, Calgary Flames and New York Islanders between 1995 and 2001. Roche was drafted by the Penguins in the third round, 62nd overall in the 1993 NHL entry draft.

== Minor hockey ==
Roche grew up in the small community of Oakwood, Ontario just west of Peterborough with his younger brother Scott, who was also an OHL player and an NHL draft choice of the St. Louis Blues. Dave grew up playing AAA hockey for the Peterborough Minor Petes system and was part of one of the top Bantam-aged teams in 1990-91.

After Bantam hockey, Roche played the 1990-91 season with the Peterborough Roadrunners Jr.B. club in the Metro Junior B. hockey league.

Roche was drafted in the 1st round (15th overall) in the 1991 OHL Priority Selection by his hometown Peterborough Petes.

== Playing career ==
Roche played four seasons in the Ontario Hockey League prior to turning pro where he was a member of the OHL champion Peterborough Petes in 1992–93. In 1994–95 he was named an OHL First Team All-Star while a member of the Windsor Spitfires.

Roche turned pro in 1995–96, playing 71 games with the Penguins, and 61 more the following year. Unable to duplicate his junior scoring prowess, Roche soon found himself in the minor leagues until a trade to Calgary brought him back to the NHL for 36 games in 1998–99. In 2000, Roche helped lead the Saint John Flames to the Calder Cup. Roche played one game with the Islanders in 2001–02, and retired following the 2003–04 campaign.

In 2008, Roche was inducted into the Lindsay and District Sports Hall of Fame.

Roche currently lives in Ennismore, Ontario and works as a financial advisor in the Peterborough area, and coaches the Peterborough Minor Petes Midget AAA team with his brother Scott.

== Career statistics ==
=== Regular season and playoffs ===
			Regular season					Playoffs
Season	Team	League	GP	G	A	Pts	PIM	GP	G	A	Pts	PIM
1990–91	Peterborough Jr. Petes	CJHL	40	22	17	39	86	—	—	—	—	—
1991–92	Peterborough Petes	OHL	62	10	17	27	134	10	0	0	0	34
1992–93	Peterborough Petes	OHL	56	40	60	100	105	21	14	15	29	42
1993–94	Peterborough Petes	OHL	34	15	22	37	127	—	—	—	—	—
1993–94	Windsor Spitfires	OHL	29	14	20	34	73	4	1	1	2	15
1994–95	Windsor Spitfires	OHL	66	55	59	114	180	10	9	6	15	16
1995–96	Pittsburgh Penguins	NHL	71	7	7	14	130	16	2	7	9	26
1996–97	Cleveland Lumberjacks	IHL	18	5	5	10	25	13	6	3	9	87
1996–97	Pittsburgh Penguins	NHL	61	5	5	10	155	—	—	—	—	—
1997–98	Syracuse Crunch	AHL	73	12	20	32	307	5	2	0	2	10
1998–99	Calgary Flames	NHL	36	3	3	6	44	—	—	—	—	—
1998–99	Saint John Flames	AHL	7	0	3	3	6	—	—	—	—	—
1999–2000	Saint John Flames	AHL	67	22	21	43	130	3	0	1	1	8
1999–2000	Calgary Flames	NHL	2	0	0	0	5	—	—	—	—	—
2000–01	Saint John Flames	AHL	79	32	26	58	179	19	3	6	9	43
2001–02	New York Islanders	NHL	1	0	0	0	0	—	—	—	—	—
2001–02	Cincinnati Mighty Ducks	AHL	29	6	7	13	41	—	—	—	—	—
2001–02	Bridgeport Sound Tigers	AHL	48	25	14	39	64	20	3	0	3	20
2002–03	Albany River Rats	AHL	76	21	16	37	89	—	—	—	—	—
2003–04	Toronto Roadrunners	AHL	60	7	13	20	88	3	0	0	0	0
AHL totals			439	125	120	245	904	50	8	7	15	81
NHL totals			171	15	15	30	334	16	2	7	9	26
