= Len Soccio =

German ice hockey player

- Born: May 28, 1967 (age 57); St. Catharines, Ontario, Canada
- Height: 5 ft 11 in (180 cm)
- Weight: 187 lb (85 kg; 13 st 5 lb)
- Position: Centre
- Shot: Right
- Played for: Hannover Scorpions; Wedemark ESC; St. Thomas Wildcats; Columbus Chill; Brantford Smoke; Greensboro Monarchs; Springfield Indians; Winston-Salem Thunderbirds; Fort Wayne Komets
- National team: Germany
- NHL draft: undrafted
- Playing career: 1987–2005

Leonard Soccio (born May 28, 1967) is a Canadian-born German former professional ice hockey player. He is currently the head coach of EC Hannover Indians in Germany.

== Playing career ==
Soccio was born in St. Catharines, Ontario. He played his junior hockey with the North Bay Centennials, an OHL team based out of North Bay, ON. In his four years with the Centennials, he scored 114 goals and 190 assists, totaling 304 points. In his final year, Soccio's 135 points was the second highest point total, trailing only Montreal Canadiens draft pick Andrew Cassels, chosen 17th overall in the NHL draft held earlier that year. Soccio won the Leo Lalonde Memorial Trophy, which is given to the best overage player in the OHL.

Soccio started his professional hockey career in the IHL with the Fort Wayne Komets, where he played one game in the 1988-89 IHL season. The following year, he played 60 games with the ECHL's Winston-Salem Thunderbirds, where he scored 51 goals and 113 points. He, along with teammate Trent Kaese and Bill McDougall of the Erie Panthers were named the starting forwards of the East Coast Hockey League's all-star team.

After several teams in various minor leagues, Soccio signed with the Hannover Scorpions of the DEL. Soccio led the Scorpions in scoring five out his eight seasons, and tied for the lead in another (teammate Gilbert Dionne had the same number of points but scored more goals). On March 7, 2006, Soccio's #20 was raised to the rafters in the form of an oversized jersey.

== Coaching career ==
Following the end of his professional playing career, he opened the Soccio Ice and Event Center in Langenhagen near the city of Hannover.

Soccio later returned to the Scorpions as a player-coach and later served as a player-coach for SC Langenhagen, a 3rd division team, where he scored 11 goals and 41 points in the 2008-09 season.

In July 2011, Soccio joined the coaching staff of Germany's women's national team as an assistant.

In August 2013, Soccio took over as head coach of the Hannover Scorpions who had withdrawn from Germany's top-tier DEL and made a fresh start in the Oberliga. In May 2016, he was named head coach of fellow Oberliga team ECC Preussen Berlin.

== Awards ==
- 1987-88: Leo Lalonde Memorial Trophy
- 1989-90: ECHL All Star
- 2001-02: DEL All-Star
- 2003-03: DEL All-Star

== Career statistics ==
=== Regular season and playoffs ===
			Regular season					Playoffs
Season	Team	League	GP	G	A	Pts	PIM	GP	G	A	Pts	PIM
1982–83	Thorold Golden Eagles	GHL	39	11	17	28	18	—	—	—	—	—
1983–84	Thorold Golden Eagles	GHL	41	20	32	52	127	—	—	—	—	—
1984–85	Thorold Golden Eagles	GHL	25	18	33	51	89	—	—	—	—	—
1984–85	North Bay Centennials	OHL	35	10	11	21	11	8	0	6	6	10
1985–86	North Bay Centennials	OHL	66	20	43	63	79	10	1	5	6	11
1986–87	North Bay Centennials	OHL	66	31	54	85	24	24	9	18	27	36
1987–88	North Bay Centennials	OHL	66	53	82	135	79	4	2	4	6	4
1987–88	Fort Wayne Komets	IHL	6	1	2	3	0	—	—	—	—	—
1988–89	Fort Wayne Komets	IHL	1	0	0	0	17	—	—	—	—	—
1988–89	Port aux Basques Mariners	NSHL	33	32	56	88	47	—	—	—	—	—
1989–90	Springfield Indians	AHL	1	0	0	0	0	—	—	—	—	—
1989–90	Winston-Salem Thunderbirds	ECHL	60	51	62	113	87	10	5	12	17	12
1990–91	Greensboro Monarchs	ECHL	63	36	55	91	186	13	10	6	16	11
1991–92	Peterborough Pirates	GBR	5	4	9	13	10	—	—	—	—	—
1991–92	Brantford Smoke	CoHL	12	12	12	24	2	—	—	—	—	—
1991–92	Columbus Chill	ECHL	38	24	34	58	149	—	—	—	—	—
1992–93	St. Thomas Wildcats	CoHL	56	44	84	128	90	15	20	21	31	25
1994–95	ESC Wedemark	DEU.2	42	49	76	125	119	—	—	—	—	—
1995–96	ESC Wedemark	DEU.2	52	52	104	156	84	—	—	—	—	—
1996–97	Wedemark Scorpions	DEL	49	25	30	55	111	8	1	6	7	18
1997–98	Hannover Scorpions	DEL	41	18	46	64	48	9	0	9	9	14
1998–99	Hannover Scorpions	DEL	51	18	35	53	120	—	—	—	—	—
1999–2000	Hannover Scorpions	DEL	56	16	43	59	46	—	—	—	—	—
2000–01	Hannover Scorpions	DEL	55	17	36	53	52	6	1	5	6	20
2001–02	Hannover Scorpions	DEL	60	25	45	70	94	—	—	—	—	—
2002–03	Hannover Scorpions	DEL	52	13	33	46	84	—	—	—	—	—
2003–04	Hannover Scorpions	DEL	51	15	25	40	50	—	—	—	—	—
2004–05	Hannover Scorpions	DEL	52	5	17	22	46	—	—	—	—	—
2008–09	SC Langenhagen Jets	DEU.4	20	12	38	50	42	—	—	—	—	—
2009–10	SC Langenhagen Jets	DEU.4	15	4	9	13	43	—	—	—	—	—
2011–12	SC Langenhagen Jets	DEU.4	11	18	22	40	26	—	—	—	—	—
ECHL totals			161	111	141	262	422	23	15	18	33	23
DEL totals			467	152	310	462	651	23	2	20	22	52

=== International ===
Year	Team	Event	GP	G	A	Pts	PIM
2000	Germany	OGQ	3	1	2	3	2
2000	Germany	WC B	7	4	3	7	2
2001	Germany	OGQ	3	2	5	7	4
2001	Germany	WC	7	0	1	1	6
2002	Germany	OG	7	3	3	6	8
2002	Germany	WC	7	3	4	7	31
2003	Germany	WC	6	2	3	5	6
Senior totals			40	15	21	36	59
