= Bumbacco Trophy =

- Sport: Ice hockey
- Awarded for: Regular season champion, West division

History
- First award: 1995
- Most wins: Plymouth/Detroit Whalers / Detroit Jr. Red Wings (11)
- Most recent: Windsor Spitfires

The Bumbacco Trophy is awarded annually to the regular season champion of the West division in the Ontario Hockey League. The trophy was inaugurated in 1994–95 season when the league realigned into three divisions. The award is named after former Sault Ste. Marie Greyhounds general manager, Angelo Bumbacco.

== Winners ==
List of winners of the Bumbacco Trophy.

Season	Team	GP	W	L	T	OTL	Pts	GF	GA
1994–95	Detroit Junior Red Wings	66	44	18	4	—	92	306	223
1995–96	Detroit Whalers	66	40	22	4	—	84	319	243
1996–97	Sault Ste. Marie Greyhounds	66	39	17	10	—	88	309	220
1997–98	London Knights	66	40	21	5	—	85	301	238
1998–99	Plymouth Whalers	68	51	13	4	—	106	313	162
1999–2000	Plymouth Whalers	68	45	18	4	1	95	256	172
2000–01	Plymouth Whalers	68	43	15	5	5	96	253	162
2001–02	Plymouth Whalers	68	39	15	12	2	92	249	166
2002–03	Plymouth Whalers	68	43	14	9	2	97	259	174
2003–04	Sarnia Sting	68	37	23	4	4	82	220	210
2004–05	Sault Ste. Marie Greyhounds	68	33	25	9	1	76	210	188
Season	Team	GP	W	L	OTL	SL	Pts	GF	GA
2005–06	Plymouth Whalers	68	35	28	1	4	75	227	225
2006–07	Plymouth Whalers	68	49	14	2	3	103	299	173
2007–08	Sault Ste. Marie Greyhounds	68	44	18	2	4	94	247	173
2008–09	Windsor Spitfires	68	57	10	0	1	115	311	171
2009–10	Windsor Spitfires	68	50	12	1	5	106	331	203
2010–11	Saginaw Spirit	68	40	22	4	2	86	243	207
2011–12	Plymouth Whalers	68	47	18	2	1	97	279	205
2012–13	Plymouth Whalers	68	42	17	5	4	93	292	202
2013–14	Sault Ste. Marie Greyhounds	68	44	17	2	5	95	267	198
2014–15	Sault Ste. Marie Greyhounds	68	54	12	0	2	110	342	196
2015–16	Sarnia Sting	68	42	19	5	2	91	254	192
2016–17	Sault Ste. Marie Greyhounds	68	48	16	3	1	100	287	208
2017–18	Sault Ste. Marie Greyhounds	68	55	7	3	3	116	317	186
2018–19	Saginaw Spirit	68	45	17	3	3	96	294	218
2019–20	Saginaw Spirit	62	41	16	3	2	87	289	225
2020–21	Not awarded, season cancelled due to COVID-19 pandemic								
2021–22	Windsor Spitfires	68	44	17	4	3	95	305	248
2022–23	Windsor Spitfires	68	44	18	4	2	94	320	265
2023–24	Saginaw Spirit	68	50	16	1	2	102	303	215
2024–25	Windsor Spitfires	68	45	17	4	2	96	309	223
2025–26	Windsor Spitfires	68	44	15	6	3	97	264	173
