= Jesse Boulerice =

American ice hockey player (born 1978)

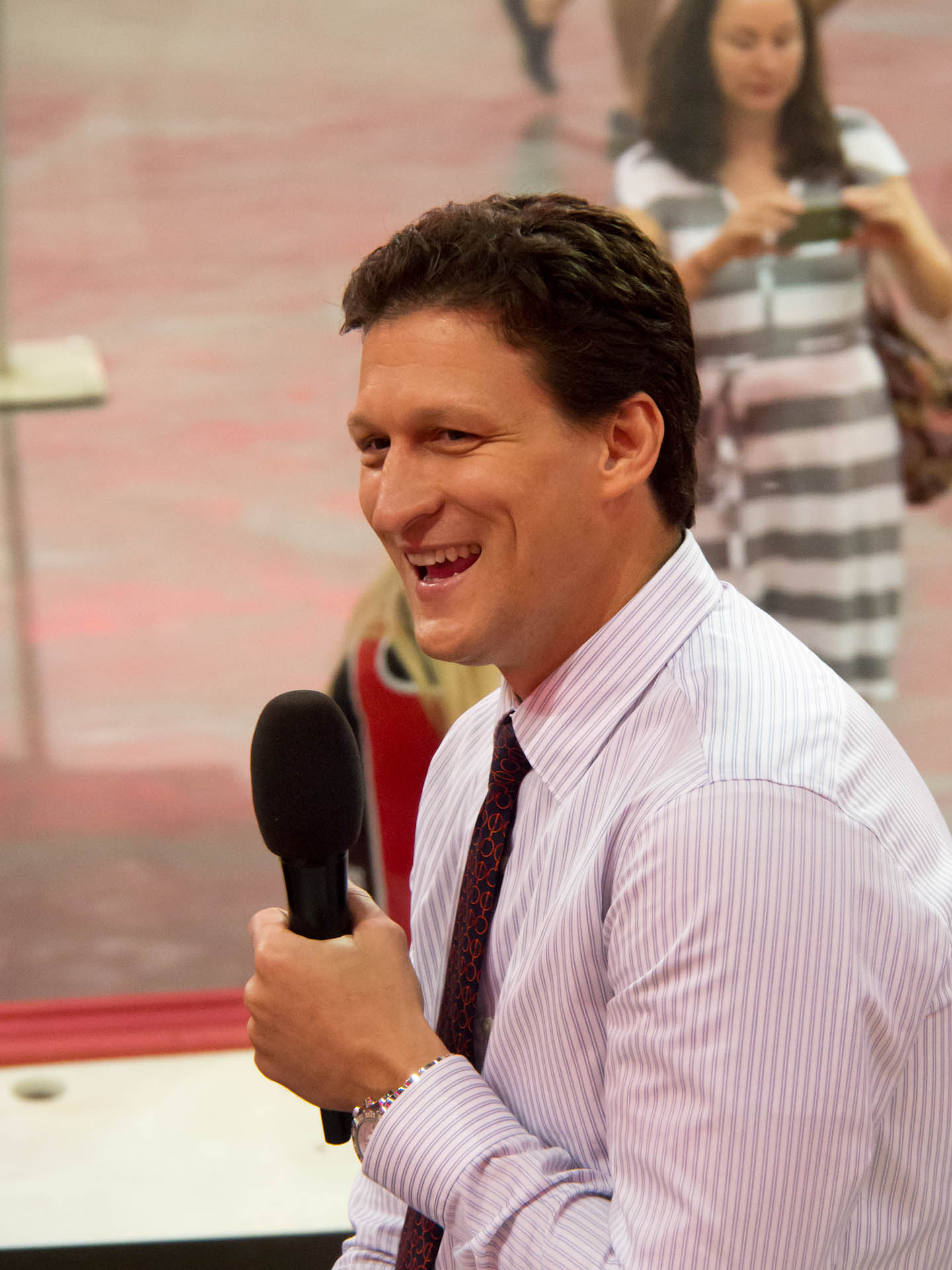
- Boulerice in 2012
- Born: August 10, 1978 (age 47) Rouses Point, New York, U.S.
- Height: 6 ft 2 in (188 cm)
- Weight: 215 lb (98 kg; 15 st 5 lb)
- Position: Right wing
- Shot: Right
- Played for: Philadelphia Flyers; Carolina Hurricanes; St. Louis Blues; Edmonton Oilers
- NHL draft: 133rd overall, 1996; Philadelphia Flyers
- Playing career: 1998–2011

Jesse James Boulerice (born August 10, 1978) is an American former professional ice hockey forward. Primarily playing in an enforcing role, Boulerice played the majority of his National Hockey League (NHL) career for the Carolina Hurricanes.

== Background ==
Boulerice was born in Rouses Point, New York, located in the northeasternmost corner of the state, on the Canadian border. In addition to working on his family's farm, young Boulerice loved playing hockey, leading to his father building a rink in their backyard. He played in the World Juniors with Team USA, winning a silver medal in 1997. As a junior, he also spent three years playing with Detroit and Plymouth of the Ontario Hockey League.

== Playing career ==
Boulerice was drafted by the Philadelphia Flyers in the 1996 NHL entry draft, 133rd overall. He has played for the Carolina Hurricanes, St. Louis Blues and Flyers. He was charged with assault in 1998 while playing with the Plymouth Whalers of the Ontario Hockey League (OHL) after a violent stick-swinging incident with Guelph Storm forward Andrew Long.

Boulerice is known for being the victim of an Aaron Downey left hook on February 11, 2003, after failing to land the first punch, which left Boulerice with a broken jaw and a concussion. Boulerice spent the night in the hospital as his Carolina Hurricanes lost in overtime to the Dallas Stars, 2–1.

Boulerice's role as an enforcer was reduced later in his career due to the NHL's stricter penalties for instigating a fight, by a $10,000 fine to the coach if it occurs in the final five minutes of a game.

On October 10, 2007, Boulerice delivered a cross-check to the face of Vancouver Canucks forward Ryan Kesler, with his team up 7–2 in the third period. Boulerice received a 25-game suspension as disciplinary action from the league, which is tied for the fourth-longest suspension for an on-ice incident in modern NHL history.

Boulerice started the 2008–09 season with the Lake Erie Monsters of the American Hockey League (AHL). On November 11, 2008, he signed a contract with the Colorado Avalanche and while being reassigned to the Monsters, was claimed off waivers by the Edmonton Oilers. After playing only two games with the Oilers, Boulerice was placed on waivers again, and was re-claimed by the Avalanche on November 21, 2008.

Boulerice was invited to the AHL's Wilkes-Barre/Scranton Penguins training camp for the 2009–10 season. He made his presence felt and remained to sign a one-year contract with the Penguins on October 3, 2009. In 54 games with Wilkes-Barre, Boulerice tied his AHL career high with four goals and led the team with 124 penalty minutes. On July 29, 2010, he re-signed with the Penguins to another one-year deal. On January 7, 2011, Boulerice was suspended for 10 games for deliberately running over an AHL referee.

== Personal life ==
After retiring from professional hockey in 2011, Boulerice became a financial advisor with Merrill-Lynch's office in Raleigh, NC. He is also a part-time coach for the Junior Hurricanes of North Carolina. He lives in Raleigh with his wife Cailin and three children. He coaches youth hockey and serves on the board of the Raleigh Youth Hockey Association.

== Career statistics ==
=== Regular season and playoffs ===
			Regular season					Playoffs
Season	Team	League	GP	G	A	Pts	PIM	GP	G	A	Pts	PIM
1994–95	Hawkesbury Hawks	CJHL	46	1	8	9	160	—	—	—	—	—
1995–96	Detroit Whalers	OHL	64	2	5	7	150	16	0	0	0	12
1996–97	Detroit Whalers	OHL	33	10	14	24	209	—	—	—	—	—
1997–98	Plymouth Whalers	OHL	53	20	23	43	170	13	2	4	6	35
1998–99	Philadelphia Phantoms	AHL	24	1	2	3	82	—	—	—	—	—
1998–99	New Orleans Brass	ECHL	12	0	1	1	38	—	—	—	—	—
1999–2000	Trenton Titans	ECHL	25	8	8	16	90	—	—	—	—	—
1999–2000	Philadelphia Phantoms	AHL	40	3	4	7	85	4	0	2	2	4
2000–01	Philadelphia Phantoms	AHL	60	3	4	7	256	10	1	1	2	28
2001–02	Philadelphia Flyers	NHL	3	0	0	0	5	—	—	—	—	—
2001–02	Philadelphia Phantoms	AHL	41	2	5	7	204	—	—	—	—	—
2001–02	Lowell Lock Monsters	AHL	15	2	4	6	80	5	0	2	2	6
2002–03	Carolina Hurricanes	NHL	48	2	1	3	108	—	—	—	—	—
2003–04	Carolina Hurricanes	NHL	76	6	1	7	127	—	—	—	—	—
2005–06	Carolina Hurricanes	NHL	26	0	0	0	51	—	—	—	—	—
2005–06	Lowell Lock Monsters	AHL	1	0	2	2	0	—	—	—	—	—
2005–06	St. Louis Blues	NHL	12	0	0	0	13	—	—	—	—	—
2006–07	Albany River Rats	AHL	16	4	3	7	36	—	—	—	—	—
2007–08	Philadelphia Flyers	NHL	5	0	0	0	29	—	—	—	—	—
2007–08	Philadelphia Phantoms	AHL	36	2	4	6	101	7	0	0	0	2
2008–09	Lake Erie Monsters	AHL	41	4	3	7	97	—	—	—	—	—
2008–09	Edmonton Oilers	NHL	2	0	0	0	0	—	—	—	—	—
2009–10	Wilkes–Barre/Scranton Penguins	AHL	54	4	3	7	124	4	0	0	0	6
2010–11	Wilkes–Barre/Scranton Penguins	AHL	67	4	7	11	147	7	0	0	0	11
AHL totals			395	29	41	70	1212	37	1	5	6	57
NHL totals			172	8	2	10	333	—	—	—	—	—

=== International ===
Year	Team	Event	Result	GP	G	A	Pts	PIM
1997	United States	WJC	2nd place, silver medalist(s)	6	0	1	1	4
1998	United States	WJC	5th	7	2	0	2	10
Junior totals				13	2	1	3	14
