= Vitali Yachmenev =

Russian ice hockey player

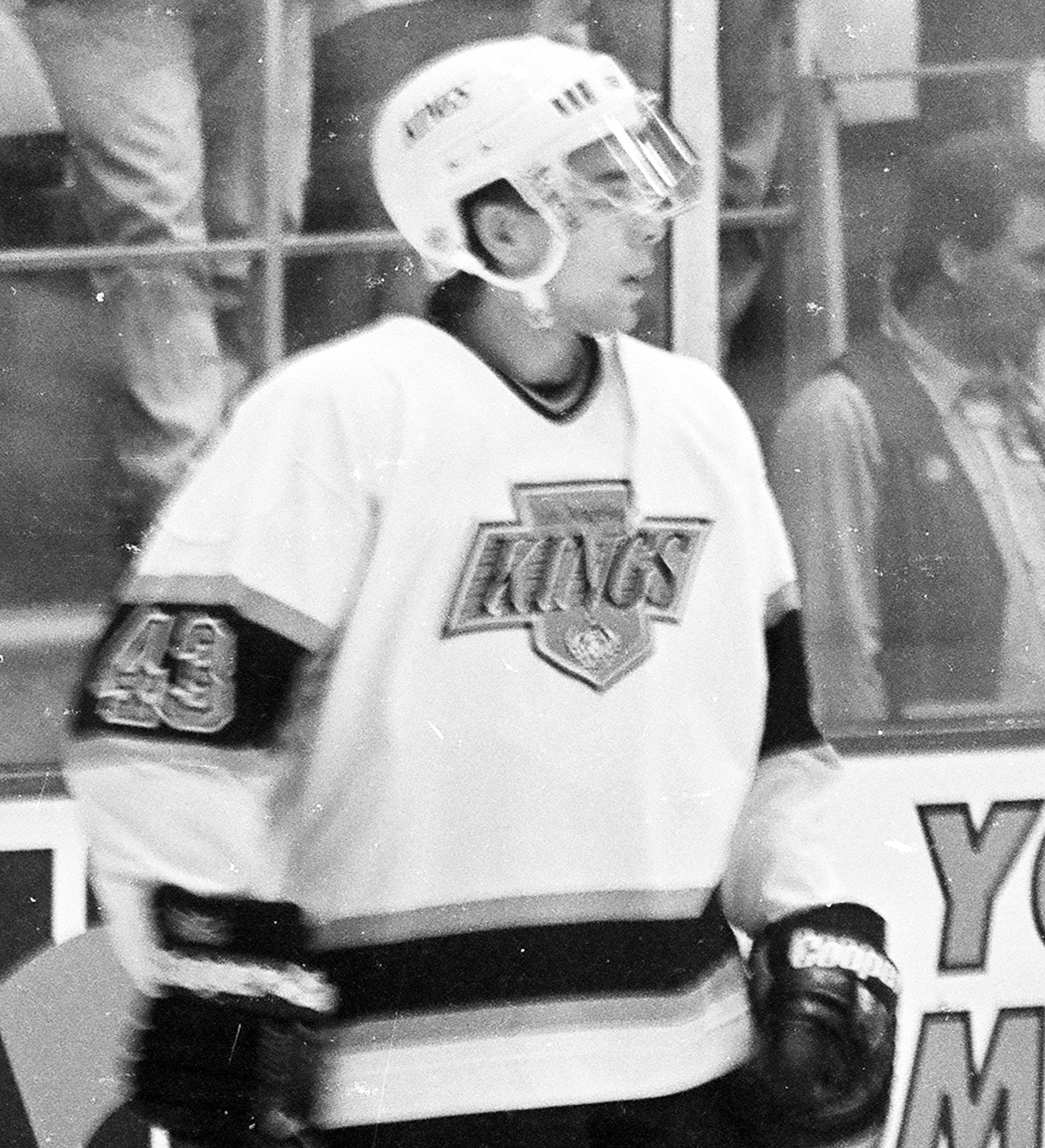
- Yachmenev as a member of the Los Angeles Kings
- Born: January 8, 1975 (age 51) Chelyabinsk, Soviet Union
- Height: 5 ft 11 in (180 cm)
- Weight: 198 lb (90 kg; 14 st 2 lb)
- Position: Right wing
- Shot: Left
- Played for: Los Angeles Kings; Nashville Predators; Amur Khabarovsk; Ak Bars Kazan; Avangard Omsk; Moscow Dynamo; Traktor Chelyabinsk
- NHL draft: 59th overall, 1994; Los Angeles Kings
- Playing career: 1995–2013

Vitali Aleksandrovich Yachmenev (Russian: Виталий Александрович Ячменёв; born January 8, 1975) is a Russian former professional ice hockey left wing. He was drafted in the third round, 59th overall, by the Los Angeles Kings in the 1994 NHL entry draft.

== Playing career ==
Drafted from the Ontario Hockey League's North Bay Centennials, Yachmenev made his National Hockey League (NHL) debut during 1995–96 season with the Kings, appearing in 80 games and scoring 19 goals. After two full seasons and part of a third with the Kings, Yachmenev was traded to the Nashville Predators before the 1998–99 season, the team's inaugural season. He played five full seasons with the Predators before returning to Russia. He has played in the Russian Hockey Super League since 2003–04, and joined team, HC Dynamo Moscow, in 2007–08. In 2008-09, he was team captain of Dynamo Moscow in the KHL. Two years later, in 2010-11, Vitali played with his hometown with Traktor Chelyabinsk. It would prove to be his last year in the KHL.

In his last two seasons, Yachmenev played for Rubin Tyumen in the Supreme Hockey League. In his NHL career, he appeared in 487 games, tallying 83 goals and 133 assists.

== Awards ==
- Emms Family Award (top first-year player in Ontario Hockey League): 1993–94 season
- CHL Rookie of the Year (most outstanding rookie in Canadian Hockey League): 1993–94 season
- William Hanley Trophy (most sportsmanlike player in Ontario Hockey League): 1994–95 season

== Career statistics ==
=== Regular season and playoffs ===
| | | | Regular season | | | | | Playoffs |
| Season | Team | League | GP | G | A | Pts | PIM | GP | G | A | Pts | PIM |
|---|---|---|---|---|---|---|---|---|---|---|---|---|
| 1991–92 | Mechel Chelyabinsk | CIS.2 | 14 | 5 | 1 | 6 | 0 | — | — | — | — | — |
| 1992–93 | Mechel Chelyabinsk | RUS.2 | 46 | 24 | 13 | 37 | 10 | — | — | — | — | — |
| 1993–94 | North Bay Centennials | OHL | 66 | 61 | 52 | 113 | 18 | 18 | 13 | 19 | 32 | 12 |
| 1993–94 | North Bay Centennials | MC | — | — | — | — | — | 3 | 1 | 3 | 4 | 2 |
| 1994–95 | North Bay Centennials | OHL | 59 | 53 | 52 | 105 | 8 | 6 | 1 | 8 | 9 | 2 |
| 1994–95 | Phoenix Roadrunners | IHL | — | — | — | — | — | 4 | 1 | 0 | 1 | 0 |
| 1995–96 | Los Angeles Kings | NHL | 80 | 19 | 34 | 53 | 16 | — | — | — | — | — |
| 1996–97 | Los Angeles Kings | NHL | 65 | 10 | 22 | 32 | 10 | — | — | — | — | — |
| 1997–98 | Los Angeles Kings | NHL | 4 | 0 | 1 | 1 | 4 | — | — | — | — | — |
| 1997–98 | Phoenix Roadrunners | IHL | 59 | 23 | 28 | 51 | 14 | 17 | 8 | 9 | 17 | 4 |
| 1998–99 | Nashville Predators | NHL | 55 | 7 | 10 | 17 | 10 | — | — | — | — | — |
| 1998–99 | Milwaukee Admirals | IHL | 16 | 7 | 6 | 13 | 0 | — | — | — | — | — |
| 1999–2000 | Nashville Predators | NHL | 68 | 16 | 16 | 32 | 18 | — | — | — | — | — |
| 2000–01 | Nashville Predators | NHL | 78 | 15 | 19 | 34 | 10 | — | — | — | — | — |
| 2001–02 | Nashville Predators | NHL | 75 | 11 | 16 | 27 | 14 | — | — | — | — | — |
| 2002–03 | Nashville Predators | NHL | 62 | 5 | 15 | 20 | 12 | — | — | — | — | — |
| 2003–04 | Amur Khabarovsk | RSL | 57 | 11 | 14 | 25 | 14 | — | — | — | — | — |
| 2004–05 | Ak Bars Kazan | RSL | 54 | 6 | 7 | 13 | 10 | — | — | — | — | — |
| 2005–06 | Avangard Omsk | RSL | 47 | 2 | 6 | 8 | 30 | 13 | 2 | 1 | 3 | 2 |
| 2006–07 | Avangard Omsk | RSL | 53 | 10 | 16 | 26 | 16 | 5 | 0 | 1 | 1 | 0 |
| 2007–08 | Dynamo Moscow | RSL | 56 | 12 | 19 | 31 | 16 | 6 | 3 | 4 | 7 | 0 |
| 2008–09 | Dynamo Moscow | KHL | 47 | 8 | 14 | 22 | 12 | 10 | 1 | 3 | 4 | 0 |
| 2009–10 | Dynamo Moscow | KHL | 36 | 3 | 9 | 12 | 14 | 4 | 2 | 1 | 3 | 6 |
| 2010–11 | Traktor Chelyabinsk | KHL | 43 | 4 | 12 | 16 | 16 | — | — | — | — | — |
| 2011–12 | Rubin Tyumen | RUS.2 | 33 | 5 | 7 | 12 | 18 | 19 | 3 | 6 | 9 | 4 |
| 2012–13 | Rubin Tyumen | RUS.2 | 50 | 11 | 12 | 23 | 24 | 12 | 2 | 2 | 4 | 6 |
| NHL totals | | | 487 | 83 | 133 | 216 | 94 | — | — | — | — | — |
| RSL totals | | | 267 | 41 | 62 | 103 | 86 | 24 | 5 | 6 | 11 | 2 |
| KHL totals | | | 126 | 15 | 35 | 50 | 42 | 14 | 3 | 4 | 7 | 6 |

=== International ===
| Year | Team | Event | Result | GP | G | A | Pts | PIM |
|---|---|---|---|---|---|---|---|---|
| 1993 | Russia | EJC | 2nd place, silver medalist(s) | 6 | 2 | 5 | 7 | 2 |
| 1995 | Russia | WJC | 2nd place, silver medalist(s) | 7 | 3 | 4 | 7 | 2 |
| Junior totals | | | | 13 | 5 | 9 | 14 | 4 |

| Preceded by Jeff O'Neill | Winner of the Emms Family Award; 1993–94 | Succeeded by Bryan Berard |
| Preceded by Jeff Friesen | CHL Rookie of the Year; 1993–94 | Succeeded by Bryan Berard |
| Preceded by Jason Allison | Winner of the William Hanley Trophy; 1994–95 | Succeeded by Jeff Williams |
