= North Bay Centennials =

Canadian junior ice hockey team (1982–2002)

- City: North Bay, Ontario
- League: Ontario Hockey League
- Operated: 1982–2002
- Home arena: North Bay Memorial Gardens
- Colours: Black, gold and white

Franchise history
- 1943–1947: St. Catharines Falcons
- 1947–1962: St. Catharines Teepees
- 1962–1976: St. Catharines Black Hawks
- 1976–1982: Niagara Falls Flyers
- 1982–2002: North Bay Centennials
- 2002–present: Saginaw Spirit

The North Bay Centennials were a Canadian junior ice hockey team in the Ontario Hockey League (OHL), who played from 1982–2002. The team was based in North Bay, Ontario, Canada, at the North Bay Memorial Gardens. The Centennials placed first overall during the 1993–94 OHL season, winning the Hamilton Spectator Trophy, and won that's season playoffs for the J. Ross Robertson Cup. Competing at the 1994 Memorial Cup, the Centennial placed fourth. At the end of the 2001–02 OHL season, the team relocated to Michigan becoming the Saginaw Spirit.

== History ==
The Niagara Falls Flyers relocated in 1982, to play home games at the North Bay Memorial Gardens. The team displaced the North Bay Trappers who played in the Ontario Provincial Junior A Hockey League. The Centennials were named for the 100th anniversary of the railroad in North Bay. The team traces its roots back to St. Catharines, Ontario, where it played from 1943–1976, as the Falcons, Teepees and Black Hawks, winning the Memorial Cup in 1954 and 1960.

The Centennials wore a white, black and gold colour scheme. The team logo from 1982 to 1998 featured the Centennials name and four wheels to form the shape of a locomotive engine. Shoulder patches featured a front view of a locomotive on tracks. The Centennials were originally owned by Reg Quinn. The team played its first home game in North Bay on September 23, 1982, defeating the Kingston Canadians by a 7–4 score. During the summer of 1986, Quinn sold the team to local automotive dealer John Hopper.

The Centennials won back-to-back Emms division titles in 1986 and 1987. In 1987 the OHL organized a Super Series for the right to host the Memorial Cup tournament between the Leyden Division champions Oshawa Generals, and the Emms Division champions North Bay Centennials. The super series was played while both teams had a first-round playoffs bye. North Bay came within one game of hosting the national junior championship, losing game seven to the Oshawa Generals. In the OHL championship series that year the Centennials and Generals faced off again with the same result, Oshawa defeating North Bay 4 games to 3.

Determined to return to the Memorial Cup, coach and general manager Bert Templeton began building his team for another championship run. In 1991–92 North Bay returned to the OHL finals, losing to their northern counterparts, the Sault Ste. Marie Greyhounds in seven games. Templeton was awarded the OHL Executive of the Year for the 1991–92 season.

Two years later in 1994, North Bay was on top of the league winning the Hamilton Spectator Trophy. They entered the playoffs as the top-ranked junior team in Canada. The Centennials prevailed in the finals by defeating the Detroit Junior Red Wings in seven games, winning the final game on an overtime goal by Jason Campeau. Injuries began to take their toll on the team as they headed to the 1994 Memorial Cup, played in Laval, Quebec. North Bay dropped all three games on the round-robin; losing 5-4 to the Laval Titan, 3-1 to the Chicoutimi Saguenéens, and 5-1 to the Kamloops Blazers.

In the summer of 1994, Ted Thomson bought a 50 percent share of the team from John Hopper. In 1998, Thomson bought the remaining 50 per cent share of the team from Hopper, then later brought in Bill Finnis as a minority partner. An updated team logo was used from 1998 to 2002, which featured an angry-looking railroad engineer holding a hockey stick. In December 2001, Thomson and Finnish sold the team to Michigan businessman Richard Garber. At the end of the 2001-02 OHL season, the Centennials relocated to Michigan becoming the Saginaw Spirit.

=== Championships ===
Season	Trophy	Recognition	Source
1985–86	Emms Trophy	Regular season Emms Division champion	
1986–87	Emms Trophy	Regular season Emms Division champion	
1993–94	Leyden Trophy	Regular season Leyden Division champion	
1993–94	Hamilton Spectator Trophy	Regular season OHL champion	
1993–94	J. Ross Robertson Cup	OHL playoffs champion	

== Coaches ==
In twenty years of operation, the North Bay Centennials had four coaches. Bert Templeton carried over from Niagara Falls and guided the team for its first twelve years. He later became the team's general manager in addition to coaching. He was awarded the OHL Executive of the Year for the 1991–92 season. When the Centennials won the championship in 1994, Templeton was awarded the Matt Leyden Trophy as OHL Coach of the Year, and the CHL Coach of the Year Award. Templton had worked the 1993–94 season without a contact, and resigned as coach and general manager in August 1994, stating a desire to relocate to Toronto and spend more time with family. Team owner John Hopper declined Templeton's offer to remain as only as general manager.

Shane Parker took over for two and a half seasons, replaced by Greg Bignell for a year and a half. Mike Kelly became the coached and general manager after leading the University of New Brunswick Reds to a national championship.

- 1982–1994: Bert Templeton (12 years)
- 1994–1996: Shane Parker (2.5 years)
- 1996–1998: Greg Bignell (1.5 years)
- 1998–2002: Mike Kelly (4 years)

== Players ==
=== Award winners ===
Season	Player	Award(s)	Recognition	Source
1987–88	Len Soccio	Leo Lalonde Memorial Trophy	Overage player of the year	
1991–92	Drake Berehowsky	CHL Defenceman of the Year	Most outstanding defenceman	
1991–92	Drake Berehowsky	Max Kaminsky Trophy	Most outstanding defenceman	
1991–92	John Spoltore	Leo Lalonde Memorial Trophy	Overage player of the year	
1991–92	John Spoltore	William Hanley Trophy	Most sportsmanlike player	
1991–92	Sandy Allan	F. W. "Dinty" Moore Trophy	Lowest rookie goals against average	
1993–94	Vitali Yachmenev	CHL Rookie of the Year	Rookie of the year	
1993–94	Vitali Yachmenev	Emms Family Award	Rookie of the year	
1993–94	Sandy Allan / Scott Roche	Dave Pinkney Trophy	Lowest team goals against average	
1993–94	Scott Roche	F. W. "Dinty" Moore Trophy	Lowest rookie goals against average	
1993–94	B. J. MacPherson	Leo Lalonde Memorial Trophy	Overage player of the year	
1994–95	Brad Brown	OHL Humanitarian of the Year Award	Humanitarian of the year	
1994–95	Vitali Yachmenev	William Hanley Trophy	Most sportsmanlike player	

=== NHL alumni ===
Forty-six alumni of the Centennials played in the National Hockey League (NHL):

- Jonas Andersson
- Shawn Antoski
- Alex Auld
- Drake Berehowsky
- Paul Bissonnette
- Jeff Bloemberg
- Dennis Bonvie
- Brad Brown
- Adam Burt
- Tony Cimellaro
- Troy Crowder
- Rob Davison
- Andy Delmore
- Jeff Eatough
- Todd Elik
- Trevor Gillies
- Paul Gillis
- Trevor Halverson
- Mike Hartman
- Derian Hatcher
- Kevin Hatcher
- Bill Houlder
- Nick Kypreos
- Bob LaForest
- Mark LaForest
- Mark LaVarre
- Mark Lawrence
- Brett MacDonald
- Jason MacDonald
- Mark Major
- Andrew McBain
- Steve McLaren
- Dave McLlwain
- Ron Meighan
- Steve Montador
- Chris Neil
- Keith Osborne
- Chad Penney
- Geoff Platt
- John Purves
- Joe Reekie
- Jeff Shevalier
- Chris Thorburn
- Tom Thornbury
- Darren Turcotte
- Vitali Yachmenev

== Season-by-season results ==
Regular season and playoffs results:

OHL playoffs champions	OHL playoffs finalists

Season	Games	Won	Lost	Tied	OTL	Points	Pct %	Goals for	Goals against	Standing	Playoffs
1982–83	70	44	23	3	—	91	0.650	352	285	3rd Emms	Won first round (Windsor Spitfires) 6–0; Lost quarterfinals (Kitchener Rangers) 8–2
1983–84	70	22	43	5	—	49	0.350	236	327	5th Emms	Lost first round (London Knights) 6–2
1984–85	66	34	28	4	—	72	0.545	289	254	3rd Emms	Lost first round (Hamilton Steelhawks) 9–7
1985–86	66	41	21	4	—	86	0.652	330	240	1st Emms	Won first round (London Knights) 9–1; Eliminated in round-robin (Guelph Platers and Windsor Spitfires)
1986–87	66	46	18	2	—	94	0.712	357	216	1st Emms	First-round bye Won quarterfinals (Kitchener Rangers) 4–0; Won semifinals (Windsor Spitfires) 4–2; Lost OHL finals (Oshawa Generals) 4–3
1987–88	66	31	30	5	—	67	0.508	284	257	4th Emms	Lost first round (Hamilton Steelhawks) 4–0
1988–89	66	24	36	6	—	54	0.409	282	334	6th Emms	Won first round (Kitchener Rangers) 4–1; Lost quarterfinals (London Knights) 4–3
1989–90	66	23	35	8	—	54	0.409	292	314	5th Emms	Lost first round (Kitchener Rangers) 4–1
1990–91	66	40	23	3	—	83	0.629	322	247	2nd Leyden	Won first round (Peterborough Petes) 4–0; Lost quarterfinals (Ottawa 67's) 4–2
1991–92	66	40	21	5	—	85	0.644	323	259	2nd Leyden	Won first round (Belleville Bulls) 4–1; Won quarterfinals (Sudbury Wolves) 4–0; Won semifinals (Peterborough Petes) 4–1; Lost OHL finals (Sault Ste. Marie Greyhounds) 4–3
1992–93	66	22	38	6	—	50	0.379	251	299	7th Leyden	Lost first round (Kingston Frontenacs) 4–1
1993–94	66	46	15	5	—	97	0.735	351	226	1st Leyden	Division quarterfinals bye Won division semifinals (Belleville Bulls) 4–2; Won division finals (Ottawa 67's) 4–1; Won OHL finals (Detroit Junior Red Wings) 4–3; Placed fourth at 1994 Memorial Cup
1994–95	66	35	27	4	—	74	0.561	272	247	3rd Eastern	Lost division quarterfinals (Belleville Bulls) 4–2
1995–96	66	14	45	7	—	35	0.265	242	360	6th Eastern	did not qualify
1996–97	66	14	44	8	—	36	0.273	214	337	6th Eastern	did not qualify
1997–98	66	15	45	6	—	36	0.273	213	291	6th Central	did not qualify
1998–99	68	22	40	6	—	50	0.368	215	48	3rd Central	Lost conference quarterfinals (Ottawa 67's) 4–0
1999–2000	68	24	35	6	3	57	0.397	14	253	3rd Central	Lost conference quarterfinals (Barrie Colts) 4–2
2000–01	68	32	28	6	2	72	0.515	232	220	3rd Central	Lost conference quarterfinals (Ottawa 67's) 4–0
2001–02	68	18	37	8	5	49	0.324	185	247	4th Central	Lost conference quarterfinals (Toronto St. Michael's Majors) 4–0
Totals	1336	587	632	107	10	—	0.439	—	—	—	—
