= Detroit Whalers =

American junior ice hockey team (1995–1997)

- City: Auburn Hills, Michigan
- League: Ontario Hockey League
- Operated: 1995–1997
- Colors: Navy blue, white, green and silver
- Head coach: Peter DeBoer

Franchise history
- 1990–1992: Detroit Compuware Ambassadors
- 1992–1995: Detroit Junior Red Wings
- 1995–1997: Detroit Whalers
- 1997–2015: Plymouth Whalers
- 2015–present: Flint Firebirds

The Detroit Whalers were a junior ice hockey team in the Ontario Hockey League for two seasons from 1995 to 1997. The Whalers were based in Auburn Hills, Michigan.

== History ==
The creation of the Detroit Whalers resulted after a failed takeover bid by Peter Karmanos to buy the National Hockey League's Detroit Red Wings from Mike Ilitch. The Junior Red Wings severed all ties with the NHL Red Wings when the relationship soured after the 1994–95 season ended.

When the Detroit Junior Red Wings were evicted from Joe Louis Arena in 1995, the franchise changed names and home arenas again. Karmanos renamed his franchise the Detroit Whalers, in association through common ownership with the NHL's Hartford Whalers team which Karmanos bought, instead of the Detroit Red Wings.

The Whalers found temporary home ice at their training base, the Oak Park Ice Arena, along with The Palace of Auburn Hills. The next year, the team had a permanent facility in Plymouth Township, Michigan. The team played for two seasons before renaming themselves again to the Plymouth Whalers.

1995–96

Shortly after the Jr. Red Wings were finished playing in the Memorial Cup, general manager & head coach Paul Maurice was promoted to the Hartford Whalers. He would be replaced by the assistant coach Peter DeBoer, as new general manager & head coach. DeBoer would remain with the Whalers organization until 2001.

The Whalers attendance suffered in their first season after losing much of its fan base in downtown Detroit. The loss of the "Junior Red Wings" name also lowered the team's profile. Peter DeBoer set about rebuilding a new image and fan base for the franchise.

DeBoer's task for his team on the ice was to prepare to play on two completely opposite home ice surfaces. The tiny Oak Park Arena favored a hard checking team while the spacious Palace (25 miles away) was an NHL size ice surface. In spite of the difference between Oak Park and the Palace, the Whalers had the OHL's best home-ice record in 1995–96 (25-6-2), and won their second consecutive Western Division title and the Bumbacco Trophy.

The 1996 playoffs started with a cross-border matchup of Detroit vs. Windsor that fans had wanted since 1990. Detroit finished 38 points ahead of Windsor during the regular season, but the series took seven games to decide. Detroit won the first three games of the series, but Windsor won the next three games. Detroit clinched the series with a 9-2 victory in game seven. The Whalers moved on to defeat the Kitchener 4 games to 1 in the second round. The Whalers were eliminated in the semi-finals, losing to the Peterborough Petes in five games.

On March 1, 1996, Whalers owner Peter Karmanos finalized plans to build a 4,000 seat arena in Plymouth Township for his team. The arena was to be ready for the 1996–97 season.

1996–97

The Whalers had arrived in Plymouth in 1996–97, and began to build a new fan base, and rebuild the team on the ice. DeBoer and newly appointed assistant coach Steve Spott chose a team full of rookies, and a handful of veterans. The Whalers revamped their roster with a hard-working scouting staff. First round pick Harold Druken scored 27 goals with 31 assists in his first season.

The Whalers made the playoffs despite finish with a losing record of 26-34-6. Detroit met their old foe, the Sault Ste. Marie Greyhounds in the playoffs. After losing the first three games, the Whalers came from three goals behind in the fourth game to prolong the series, winning 4-3 in double overtime. The game was the longest in the franchise's history (90 minutes, 2 seconds). The Greyhounds won the next game 8-3, but the Whalers' rookies gained valuable experience for the next season.

== Players ==
Bryan Berard won his second consecutive Max Kaminsky Trophy in 1995–96 as the most outstanding defenceman in the OHL. The same season he was the Canadian Hockey League defenceman of the year.

The Detroit Whalers sent seven players onto the National Hockey League while only operating for two seasons.

- Bryan Berard
- Jesse Boulerice
- Harold Druken
- Robert Esche
- Sean Haggerty
- Mike Minard
- Mike Rucinski

== Season-by-season results ==
Season-by-season results of the Detroit Whalers:

Legend: GP = Games played, W = Wins, L = Losses, T = Ties, OTL = Overtime losses, SL = Shoot-out losses, Pts = Points, GF = Goals for, GA = Goals against

Memorial Cup champions	OHL champions	OHL runners-up

Season	GP	W	L	T	Pts	Win %	GF	GA	Standing	Playoffs
1995–96	66	40	22	4	84	0.636	319	243	1st West	Won first round (Windsor Spitfires) 4–3; Won quarterfinal (Kitchener Rangers) 4–1; Lost semifinal (Peterborough Petes) 4–1
1996–97	66	26	34	6	58	0.439	230	270	4th West	Lost first round (Sault Ste. Marie Greyhounds) 4–1

== Arenas ==
During the 1995–96 season, the Whalers played 21 regular season home games at The Palace of Auburn Hills, and the remaining 12 regular season home games and playoff home games at the Oak Park Ice Arena.

Karmanos built the Whalers a new home in Plymouth Township as soon as the 1995–96 season ended, constructed in six months for the 1996–97 season. The Whalers played all games of their second season at the Compuware Sports Arena.
