= Kingston Memorial Centre =

Building in Ontario, Canada

Coordinates: 44.2393°N 76.4998°W

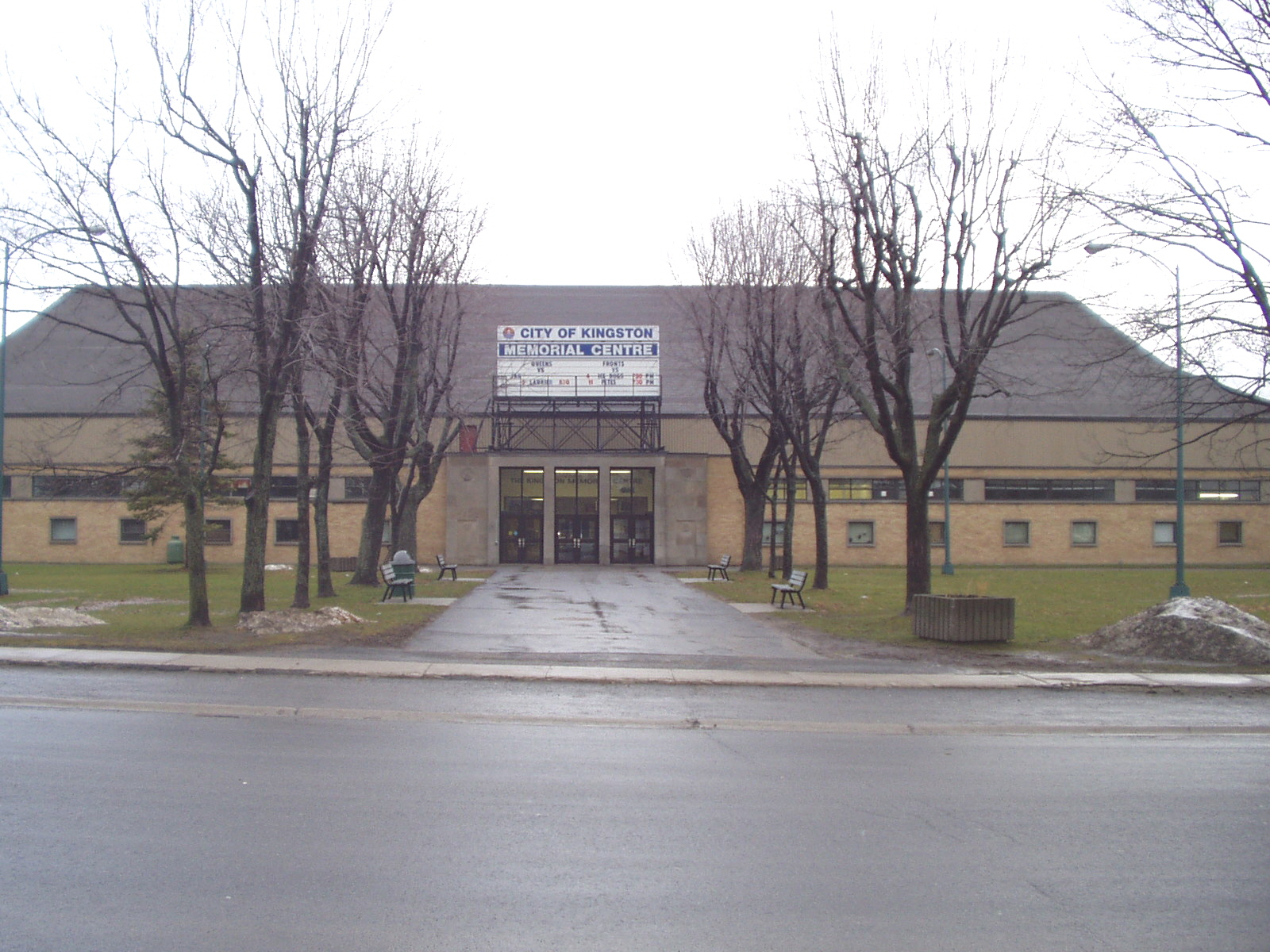
Exterior of Memorial Centre.

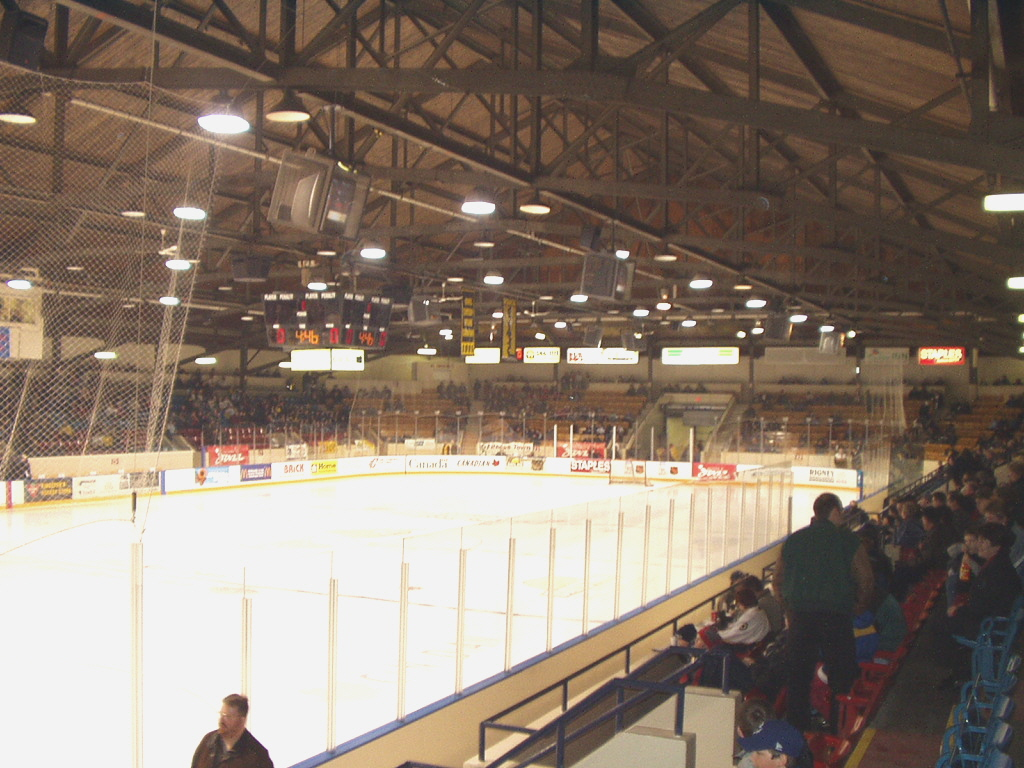
Interior of Memorial Centre.

The Kingston Memorial Centre is a 3,300-seat multi-purpose arena located at 303 York Street in Kingston, Ontario, Canada. Opened in 1951, the Kingston Community Memorial Health and Recreation Centre was designed as a community sports and entertainment centre that would become a "living memorial" in remembrance of Kingstonians who died in both world wars and the Korean War (Planning Partnership-Hughes Downey Architects 2007, p. 5). The Memorial Centre lands and facilities include a war memorial, a large ice pad in the arena building, a new outdoor aquatic centre, agricultural barns, softball diamonds, a cinder track, off leash dog park and a linear park at the east, north and west perimeter of the property. Just east of the arena building was the International Hockey Hall of Fame (IHHOF) museum building at 277 York St. In July 2012, Kingston City Council approved the relocation of the collection on a short-term basis to the Invista Centre on Gardiners Road in Kingston. The existing building was found to have costly repair issues related to moisture penetration. It was demolished after the IHHOF moved to the Invista Centre in Kingston's west end.

The Memorial Centre land has been publicly owned since it was acquired in 1841 by the British Government. Its cultural significance reflects local Kingston agricultural, military and recreational history (Planning Partnership-Hughes Downey Architects 2007, p. 4).

As the Memorial Centre building aged consideration was given by the City of Kingston for ways to rehabilitate the property. In 1993 Parkin Consultants Limited issued a Final Report on the possible uses of the property based primarily on 1980s data. In 1987, the Kingston Canadians junior hockey club was the main tenant with 60% of the facilities events. Entertainment programing accounted for 12% and trade or consumer shows 24% of events. In 1987 there were $774,862 in ticket sales, facility rentals and other income. But operating costs were $1,093,473. The Parkin report noted that the deficit of $318,311 could be reduced with decreased through measures to reduce maintenance and energy costs and by increasing rent, ticket sales, and canteen revenues.

The Memorial Centre was the home to the Kingston Frontenacs ice hockey team and its predecessors, the Kingston Canadians and Kingston Raiders from 1973 to 2008. It was also home to the Kingston Frontenacs of the Eastern Professional Hockey League from 1959 to 1963. When a new downtown arena, the Leon's Centre opened in 2008, the Frontenacs moved to the new facility, playing their last game at the Memorial Centre on February 15, 2008.

The Kingston Memorial Centre is the site of the annual Kingston Fall Fair operated by the Kingston and District Agricultural Society. Established in Kingston in 1830 as the Midland Fair and revived in 1912, the Kingston Fall Fair is held over four days each September. It is the second oldest Fair in Ontario, with attendance over 16,000. The society sponsors the Fair with the objective of promoting education through agriculture. The fair includes the largest dairy show held in Ontario.

Since the 1950s the Memorial Centre has been used for many cultural and recreational events including performances by Johnny Cash in 1958 and 1987. Kingston's The Tragically Hip played the centre in 1995 In 2010 it become the home of Kingston Derby Girls, Kingston's first official women's roller derby league.

After 2008, the Memorial Centre became the permanent home of the Queen's Golden Gaels (Queen's varsity hockey), figure skating, and Queen's intramural ice sports. It replaced the Jock Harty Arena which had been demolished to allow for the construction of new athletic facilities at Queen's University. The Church Athletic League of Kingston hockey teams are based at the centre.

== History ==
In 1792, John Graves Simcoe, the first Lieutenant Governor of the province of Upper Canada, assisted with the formation of the Agricultural Society of Upper Canada based at Niagara-on-the-Lake to further the development of agriculture in Upper Canada. The society helped to promote agriculture through local agricultural societies and fairs.

On July 12, 1825, the Upper Canada Herald contained an advertisement for the Frontenac Agricultural Society Fair to be held near Kingston. The fair operated on and off until 1925. That year the group reorganized under the name of the Kingston and District Agricultural Society. It has operated the Kingston Fair successfully since that time.

As of 1855 the Midland Agricultural Association (which later evolved into the Frontenac Agricultural Society) leased a 23-acre site at the north end of the federal penitentiary reserve bounded on two sides by Palace and Bath Roads. There they built the Crystal Palace (hence the name Palace Road) in 1858 which was moved to the south-east corner of the Memorial Centre site at York and Alfred and re-erected in 1880 after they acquired the land.

Frontenac Member of Provincial Parliament (MPP) Joseph Longford Haycock (1894 to 1898) served for a number of years as President of the Frontenac Agricultural Association.

The association sold the land to the City of Kingston in January, 1897 for $17,000. (See transfer dated July 5, 1897, Instrument no. CK13650 and Abstract Index 36072-0235 (R) for Land Registry Office #134). Some of the buildings were transferred from the penitentiary grounds along with the Crystal Palace. A 1915 fire insurance map shows buildings (poultry, dairy, horse barns and exhibition building), a grandstand and half-mile track and palace on the property.

=== Capital fund raising ===
In November 1944 the Corporation of the City of Kingston passed a by-law for the Establishment, Development and Management of the Kingston Community Memorial Health and Recreation Centre and a by-law authorizing debentures of $100,000 toward the establishment of the centre. But money was not to be provided until the building committee raised $225,000 from the community. The Legislative Assembly of Ontario confirmed the expenditure in Bill 9, "An Act respecting the City of Kingston" which received Third Reading on March 22, 1945.

A campaign fund raising pamphlet indicates objective of $400,000 plus $100,000 from the City of Kingston. Donations of more than $38,000 had been received from 65 donors in the closing months of 1945. The pamphlet includes reference to "the grounds enclosed by the already established half-mile race track… will be used for softball and baseball diamonds, tennis courts etc".

By August 1945, at the end of World War II, $80,000 had been raised for the building of the centre. In 1949 Bill Henderson was elected Liberal Member of Parliament for Kingston and the Islands. In 1950 Henderson found federal funds through the Minister of Agriculture for the centre. But the capital funding was tied to the project being dedicated to agricultural purposes and activities as there were no federal funds for an arena. Further capital funding came from the province of Ontario.

=== City of Kingston and Agricultural Society, 1950 agreement ===
In a 1950 agreement between the City of Kingston and the Agricultural Society, the Society assigned grants of $300,000 ($150,000 by the Government of Canada and $150,000 by the province of Ontario) to the city with the following provisions:

- provides for a Memorial Centre Board (this local board was terminated with the 1997 Provincial Amalgamation Order creating the new City of Kingston and was replaced by an Advisory Committee; the City took over all functions of Board)
- s. 2: rights to use are subject to the Society abiding by regulations and rates set by the City of Kingston
- s. 2(a) Society has right to use and enjoyment of Fair Grounds, Auditorium and other ancillary buildings and equipment of the Kingston Community Health Recreation Centre for the period when fairs are held. This right does not generally extend beyond the period in September when fairs are held.
- 2(b) Society has use and enjoyment of other buildings and erections constructed for the purposes of advancing interests of agriculture. [structures are owned by the City of Kingston]
- 2( c) Society has use and enjoyment of the auditorium when not otherwise allocated or required by the Board of Trustees, for the purposes of the Society. [the "Auditorium" is the arena area and the City of Kingston allocates use of it fully throughout year]
- 2(d) to have expended toward the cost of constructing other buildings for purposes of advancing interests of agriculture, an amount equal to 50% of net profit from operating the Centre [since there has never been a net profit from operations this section of the agreement has never been operative].

=== Recent history ===
In November 2003, Harvey Rosen was elected mayor of the City of Kingston by a resounding margin. A major plank in his campaign was his commitment to solve the issue of the aging Kingston Memorial Centre, the home to the local OHL hockey team the Kingston Frontenacs, which had a game cancelled during the election campaign due to a leaky roof.

The Memorial Centre built in 1951 had not been kept up-to-date during its existence and did not now meet promoters and performers needs. Very few performers had performed at the Memorial in the prior 15 years. There had been a number of studies and attempts in the past two decades to address the issues by either renovating the Memorial Centre or building a new facility. Mayor Rosen had committed during his campaign to appoint a citizen task force to explore the problem and present a solution including funding suggestions within 100 days.

In April 2004 the Mayor's Task Force submitted its report to the Mayor which contained 22 recommendations; the main recommendation was to build a new large venue entertainment centre (LVEC) in downtown Kingston. The mayor presented the report to city council and city council constituted a five-person council committee to verify the validity of the report. The committee and then city council verified the general validity of the report in particular the recommendation to build a 5,500 seat venue in downtown Kingston and constituted a steering committee of public and city council members to make its own implementation recommendations to see a LVEC become a reality, including develop a funding solution, as the funding suggestions in the Mayor's Task Force Report were far from complete, it being implicit that a full funding solution would have to be presented to council for approval. Although selling a portion of the Memorial Centre was suggested in recommendation 7 of the mayors Taxk Force Report the steering committee made alternate recommendations regarding funding the new centre which did not include selling any portion of the Memorial Centre grounds to the joy of most of the community. Council endorsed the recommendations of their steering committee. Although controversial at the time, some in community thinking that the Memorial Centre had been saved from the abyss, the truth is that the recommendation of the volunteer member's of the Mayor's Task Force to sell a portion of the Memorial Centre was never brought to a vote at City Council.

Although council's steering committee had not tabled its final report regarding the implementation plan for council approval, there was community pressure to address the volunteer task forces finance recommendation to use the Memorial Centre as a financing source. Though the sale of Memorial Centre was never more than a funding idea presented by a citizen's task force, and although there was never an indication that it was going to be adopted by the steering committee, Council didn't remove it from the business plan for a year and a half and deferred a motion to do so in November, 2004. [source: Council minutes] At the November, 2004 Council meeting delegations were made before Council including that by a local architect who presented her research showing Williamsville District has by far the least park, recreational and cultural space per capita (less than 2/3 of the next lowest District (Kingscourt Strathcona) and pointed out the Official Plan designation of Memorial Centre, singled out as a significant element in the recreational land use system, as Open Area Space and Recreational Space. The Official Plan provides that public open space shall not be sold or alienated in any way unless disposal is warranted by extenuating circumstances and that disposal of any public open space shall be discouraged. This delegation also noted that the Ontario Provincial Policy Statement promoted the equitable distribution of publicly accessible built and natural settings for recreation. Another delegation presented statistics on the importance of recreational facilities and park space to physical health.

Petitions presented to Council between March 30, 2005, and November 20, 2005, totaling 7,380 signatures opposed the sale of the property, the destruction of the building, and the loss of much-needed public park and recreational lands. The signatories recognized the facilities as a living Memorial to those to sacrificed their lives for our Country and, as such, should continue to serve their purpose as a focal point for the many and varied community activities in the neighbourhoods and the city. [Source: Council minutes; see also letters to Friends of the Memorial Centre from City Clerk dated March 30, 2005, April 20, 2005, May 4, 2005, May 20, 2005, and November 10, 2005, when the majority of signatures were presented]

In November, 2005, Kingston City Council unanimously passed the November, 2004 motion to save the Memorial Centre with some amendments:

- voted unanimously to endorse the use of the site as public community facilities - to strike a revitalization committee - to hold a public meeting before a report on revitalization was brought back to the City

==== Mandate of the Memorial Centre Revitalization Committee ====
The Memorial Centre Revitalization Committee has a mandate to prepare and recommend to City Council a development concept plan and detailed multi-year implementation strategy for revitalization and rejuvenation of the entire 23 acre Memorial Centre site as a public community recreational facility or facilities that will also serve as a fitting living memorial to the men and women of Kingston who lost their lives in the two world wars, the Korean war and subsequent military commitments. The committee would ensure ongoing and inclusive community consultation on the use and operation of the centre.

In November 2006, a City Workshop report on a Planning Partnership for the Memorial Centre was released. Over 120 interest groups and agencies were contacted for the report, including the Agricultural Society which indicated the need for improved fencing for crowd control; and improve and increase indoor display space and promote education.

In July 2007, a Planning Partnership Concept Plan and detailed a multi-year implementation process for the Revitalization and Rejuvenation of the Memorial Centre site report was presented by the City of Kingston. It identifies the Kingston District Agricultural Society (KDAS) as an important stakeholder and the need to respond to physical requirements of the annual fall fair. Members of the design team met with Fair Board to try to understand those needs (see p. 10)

At a City of Kingston Revitalization Committee meeting held in October 2008, it was noted that it would be difficult to plan for entire site until the completion of discussions with the Agricultural Society on the needs of the Fair.

In May 2009, Kingston City Council approved the building of a linear park on the east, west and north side of the centre. Fencing was designed to meet the needs of the Kingston District Agricultural Society during the Fall Fair in September.

In February 2010, a linear park was developed in part through discussions by the city with the Agricultural Society to ensure there was no negative impact on the Fall Fair. For example, temporary fencing was not adequate for animal control.

In July 2010, a City of Kingston Traffic Division staff report does not support proposed pedestrian crossings as it asserts that traffic does not have to yield.

In May 2011, an e-mail to Friends and Neighbours of the Memorial Centre from City staff noted that the Kingston Community can be very proud of its contribution in reshaping the venue including the creation or sustaining of:

- accessible walking paths
- off leash dog park, shade structure
- local hockey leagues
- men's and women's university hockey
- a splash pad
- a lazy river pool
- a 10m swimming pool
- diving pool
- zero entry pool
- shade structures and lounge chairs
- running track
- continuation of the Fall Fair
- softball diamonds
- community gardens office
- softball diamonds
- pollinator garden
- new memorial gardens
- memorial walls
- the Kingston and District Agricultural Society office

== Kingston Memorial Centre Advisory Committee ==
The City of Kingston, Kingston Memorial Centre Advisory Committee advises City Council and staff on the following issues:

- Capital upgrades to the Kingston Memorial Centre site and related facilities and amenities.
- Future developments and plans for the Kingston Memorial Centre site and facilities and amenities.
- Community partnerships and programs

=== Committee Members for 2011-12 ===
Councillor Sandy Berg, Councillor Jim Neill, Janine Handforth, Michael Dakin, David Garrick, Steve Garrison, Ken Ohtake

== Memorial Centre Farmers’ Market ==
In 2012, Kingston City Council approved the establishment of a new farmers' market at the Memorial Centre. The Memorial Centre Farmers’ Market started up on May 20, 2012. It promotes local food grown and produced within about 100 km of the market. The market's goal is to expand the market for "sustainably-produced food in Kingston".

== School development proposal ==
In early summer 2012, news of discussions to sell part of the Memorial Centre to the Limestone District School Board for a new high school was released. Early public comment on the suggestion was largely negative and city councillors seem divided on the issue. The results of any further discussions between the city and the school board were undecided as of early 2013. On June 4, 2013, Kingston City Council adopted a motion to not sell any of the land at the Memorial Centre or the Cook's Brothers Arena for a new school building. A year later, in June 2014, Kingston City Council re confirmed its 2013 decision not to sell any portion of the property.

On February 3, 2015, the newly elected Kingston City Council, featuring seven (of thirteen) first-time Councillors, voted 9-3 not to consider the property for a school.

== Bibliography ==
- "Final Report on the Revitalization of the Memorial Centre Site | Planning Partnership-Hughes Downey Architects" (PDF). cityofkingston.ca. 2007.
