= Peterborough Memorial Centre =

Multi-purpose arena in Peterborough, Ontario, Canada

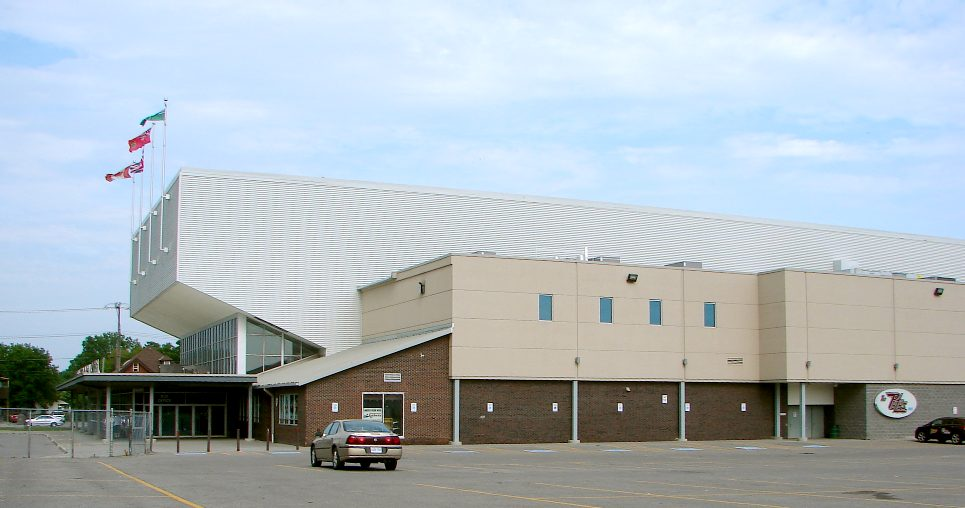
- Peterborough Memorial Centre

- Location within Ontario Location within Canada
- Address: 151 Lansdowne Street West; Peterborough, Ontario; K9J 1Y4
- Coordinates: 44°17′19″N 78°18′56″W
- Capacity: Ice Hockey: 3,729 (4,329 with standing room)
- Surface: Multi-surface

Construction
- Groundbreaking: 1954
- Opened: November 8, 1956
- Renovated: 2003
- Cost: C$875,000 ($10 million in 2025 dollars)
- Architects: Blackwell, Craig & Zeidler
- General contractor: Eastwood Construction

Tenants
- Peterborough Petes (OHL) (1956–present); Peterborough Lakers (MSL) (1968–present)

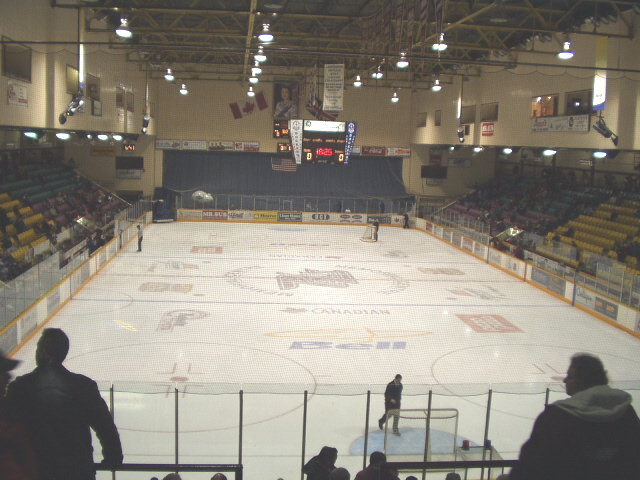
Interior of Peterborough Memorial Centre before renovation

The Peterborough Memorial Centre is a 4,329-seat multi-purpose arena in Peterborough, Ontario, Canada. Built in 1956, it is now home to the Peterborough Petes of the Ontario Hockey League and the Peterborough Lakers of the Major Series Lacrosse league.

The Peterborough Memorial Centre is a single-pad arena. It is most noted for having had a large stage to the south end of the arena and for the large portrait of Elizabeth II painted by notable local artist David Bierk that previously hung above the ice. (The portrait was moved to the Peterborough Art Gallery). It is named in honour of the many war veterans who came from the region.

Along with hockey, the arena has hosted many events from trade shows, summer fairs, to lacrosse games and corporate Christmas celebrations for large industries such as Canadian General Electric.

In 2003, the Memorial Centre was renovated adding 24 luxury box suites, improved concessions, a licensed restaurant, new seats, boards, scoreboard and the addition of air conditioning. In late 2005, the building added a full video scoreboard. When the Memorial Centre was renovated, the stage was replaced with a restaurant.
