= 1994–95 OHL season =

Junior ice hockey season

The 1994–95 OHL season was the 15th season of the Ontario Hockey League. The Newmarket Royals relocated, and became the Sarnia Sting. The OHL realigned from two divisions, creating the east, central, and west divisions. The Bumbacco Trophy is inaugurated to be awarded to the first place team in the west division, during the regular season. The Leyden Trophy is reallocated to the east division, and the Emms Trophy to the central division. Sixteen teams each played 66 games. The Detroit Junior Red Wings won the J. Ross Robertson Cup, defeating the Guelph Storm.

== Relocation ==
=== Newmarket Royals to Sarnia Sting ===
The Newmarket Royals relocated to Sarnia and were renamed the Sarnia Sting after two seasons in Newmarket. The club was sold to the Ciccarelli brothers at the beginning of the 1993-94 season and were relocated to Sarnia for the 1994-95 season.

The club was originally the Cornwall Royals from 1969-1992, in which the franchise won the Memorial Cup three times. Following the 1991-92, the franchise was relocated to Newmarket. In two seasons in Newmarket, the Royals made the playoffs once, losing to the Sudbury Wolves in the first round of the 1993 playoffs.

The Sting will play at the Sarnia Arena and play in the newly created West Division.

== Arena Renaming ==
=== London Gardens to London Ice House ===
The London Knights home arena, the London Gardens, was renamed to the London Ice House after the team and arena were purchased by new owner Doug Tarry. Tarry upgraded the building, including replacing seats and add more emergency exits to bring the building up to the fire code.

== Realignment ==
The OHL announced realignment for the 1994-95 season, as the league would now have three divisions based on geographical location. The three new divisions were the East Division, Central Division and West Division.

=== East Division ===
Six teams from the Leyden Division would form the newly created East Division. The teams are: Belleville Bulls, Kingston Frontenacs, North Bay Centennials, Oshawa Generals and Ottawa 67's. The winner of the East Division will earn the Leyden Trophy.

=== Central Division ===
Five teams would make up the newly created Central Division, four teams from the Emms Division and one from the Leyden Division. The teams were: Guelph Storm, Kitchener Rangers, Niagara Falls Thunder, Owen Sound Platers, and Sudbury Wolves. The winner of the Central Division will be awarded the Emms Trophy.

=== West Division ===
Five teams would make up the newly created West Division, four teams from the Emms Division and one from the Leyden Division. The teams are: Detroit Junior Red Wings, London Knights, Sarnia Sting, Sault Ste. Marie Greyhounds and Windsor Spitfires. The winner of the West Division will earn the newly created Bumbacco Trophy.

== Regular season ==
=== Final standings ===
Note: DIV = Division; GP = Games played; W = Wins; L = Losses; T = Ties; GF = Goals for; GA = Goals against; PTS = Points; x = clinched playoff berth; y = clinched division title; z = earned first round bye

=== East Division ===
Rank	Team	GP	W	L	T	PTS	GF	GA
1	z-Kingston Frontenacs	66	40	19	7	87	284	224
2	x-Oshawa Generals	66	40	21	5	85	300	242
3	x-North Bay Centennials	66	35	27	4	74	272	247
4	x-Belleville Bulls	66	32	31	3	67	295	287
5	x-Peterborough Petes	66	26	34	6	58	255	286
6	Ottawa 67's	66	22	38	6	50	232	276

=== Central Division ===
Rank	Team	GP	W	L	T	PTS	GF	GA
1	z-Guelph Storm	66	47	14	5	99	330	200
2	x-Sudbury Wolves	66	43	17	6	92	314	208
3	x-Owen Sound Platers	66	22	38	6	50	239	299
4	x-Niagara Falls Thunder	66	18	40	8	44	231	298
5	x-Kitchener Rangers	66	18	42	6	42	216	296

=== West Division ===
Rank	Team	GP	W	L	T	PTS	GF	GA
1	y-Detroit Junior Red Wings	66	44	18	4	92	306	223
2	x-Windsor Spitfires	66	41	22	3	85	303	232
3	x-Sarnia Sting	66	24	37	5	53	250	292
4	x-London Knights	66	18	44	4	40	210	309
5	Sault Ste. Marie Greyhounds	66	17	45	4	38	228	346

=== Scoring leaders ===
Player	Team	GP	G	A	Pts	PIM
Marc Savard	Oshawa Generals	66	43	96	139	78
David Ling	Kingston Frontenacs	62	61	74	135	136
Bill Bowler	Windsor Spitfires	61	33	102	135	63
Jeff O'Neill	Guelph Storm	57	43	81	124	56
Darryl LaFrance	Oshawa Generals	57	55	67	122	10
Todd Bertuzzi	Guelph Storm	62	54	65	119	58
Dave Roche	Windsor Spitfires	66	55	59	114	180
Steve Washburn	Ottawa 67's	63	43	63	106	72
Vitali Yachmenev	North Bay Centennials	59	53	52	105	8
Lee Jinman	North Bay Centennials	63	39	65	104	41

== Playoffs ==
Division quarterfinals
C3	Owen Sound	4
C4	Niagara Falls	2
E4	Belleville	4
E3	North Bay	2
W2	Windsor	4
W3	Sarnia	0
C2	Sudbury	4
C5	Kitchener	1
W1	Detroit	4
W4	London	0
E5	Peterborough	4
E2	Oshawa	3

Quarterfinals
C1	Guelph	4
C3	Owen Sound	0
E1	Kingston	3
E4	Belleville	4
W2	Windsor	2
C2	Sudbury	4
W1	Detroit	4
E5	Peterborough	0

Semifinals
C1	Guelph	4
E4	Belleville	0
C2	Sudbury	3
W1	Detroit	4

Finals
C1	Guelph	2
W1	Detroit	4

=== Division quarter-finals ===
==== East Division ====
===== (2) Oshawa Generals vs. (5) Peterborough Petes =====
March 19	Peterborough Petes	6 – 4	Oshawa Generals	Oshawa Civic Auditorium

March 21	Oshawa Generals	2 – 5	Peterborough Petes	Peterborough Memorial Centre

March 23	Peterborough Petes	3 – 4	Oshawa Generals	Oshawa Civic Auditorium

March 25	Oshawa Generals	5 – 2	Peterborough Petes	Peterborough Memorial Centre

March 26	Peterborough Petes	5 – 8	Oshawa Generals	Oshawa Civic Auditorium

March 28	Oshawa Generals	3 – 5	Peterborough Petes	Peterborough Memorial Centre

March 30	Peterborough Petes	7 – 5	Oshawa Generals	Oshawa Civic Auditorium

Peterborough wins series 4 – 3

===== (3) North Bay Centennials vs. (4) Belleville Bulls =====
March 19	Belleville Bulls	2 – 3	OT	North Bay Centennials	North Bay Memorial Gardens

March 21	North Bay Centennials	5 – 6	OT	Belleville Bulls	Yardmen Arena

March 23	Belleville Bulls	7 – 4	North Bay Centennials	North Bay Memorial Gardens

March 25	North Bay Centennials	7 – 8	OT	Belleville Bulls	Yardmen Arena

March 26	Belleville Bulls	4 – 5	OT	North Bay Centennials	North Bay Memorial Gardens

March 28	North Bay Centennials	3 – 5	Belleville Bulls	Yardmen Arena

Belleville wins series 4 – 2

==== Central Division ====
===== (2) Sudbury Wolves vs. (5) Kitchener Rangers =====
March 19	Kitchener Rangers	4 – 11	Sudbury Wolves	Sudbury Community Arena

March 21	Kitchener Rangers	2 – 10	Sudbury Wolves	Sudbury Community Arena

March 22	Sudbury Wolves	1 – 2	Kitchener Rangers	Kitchener Memorial Auditorium

March 24	Sudbury Wolves	4 – 3	OT	Kitchener Rangers	Kitchener Memorial Auditorium

March 26	Kitchener Rangers	1 – 6	Sudbury Wolves	Sudbury Community Arena

Sudbury wins series 4 – 1

===== (3) Owen Sound Platers vs. (4) Niagara Falls Thunder =====
March 18	Niagara Falls Thunder	3 – 4	Owen Sound Platers	Bayshore Community Centre

March 21	Owen Sound Platers	3 – 2	OT	Niagara Falls Thunder	Niagara Falls Memorial Arena

March 24	Niagara Falls Thunder	5 – 3	Owen Sound Platers	Bayshore Community Centre

March 25	Owen Sound Platers	2 – 3	Niagara Falls Thunder	Niagara Falls Memorial Arena

March 26	Niagara Falls Thunder	1 – 6	Owen Sound Platers	Bayshore Community Centre

March 28	Owen Sound Platers	4 – 3	Niagara Falls Thunder	Niagara Falls Memorial Arena

Owen Sound wins series 4 – 2

==== West Division ====
===== (1) Detroit Junior Red Wings vs. (4) London Knights =====
March 20	London Knights	0 – 11	Detroit Jr. Red Wings	Joe Louis Arena

March 21	London Knights	4 – 5	Detroit Jr. Red Wings	Joe Louis Arena

March 24	Detroit Jr. Red Wings	3 – 2	London Knights	London Ice House

March 25	Detroit Jr. Red Wings	4 – 0	London Knights	London Ice House

Detroit wins series 4 – 0

===== (2) Windsor Spitfires vs. (3) Sarnia Sting =====
March 20	Sarnia Sting	3 – 4	Windsor Spitfires	Windsor Arena

March 21	Windsor Spitfires	4 – 3	OT	Sarnia Sting	Sarnia Arena

March 23	Sarnia Sting	0 – 7	Windsor Spitfires	Windsor Arena

March 24	Windsor Spitfires	7 – 4	Sarnia Sting	Sarnia Arena

Windsor wins series 4 – 0

=== OHL quarter-finals ===
==== (C1) Guelph Storm vs. (C3) Owen Sound Platers ====
March 31	Owen Sound Platers	2 – 5	Guelph Storm	Guelph Memorial Gardens

April 2	Guelph Storm	4 – 3	Owen Sound Platers	Bayshore Community Centre

April 4	Owen Sound Platers	2 – 5	Guelph Storm	Guelph Memorial Gardens

April 7	Guelph Storm	6 – 2	Owen Sound Platers	Bayshore Community Centre

Guelph wins series 4 – 0

==== (W1) Detroit Junior Red Wings vs. (E5) Peterborough Petes ====
April 1	Peterborough Petes	0 – 8	Detroit Jr. Red Wings	Joe Louis Arena

April 3	Peterborough Petes	3 – 4	OT	Detroit Jr. Red Wings	Joe Louis Arena

April 5	Detroit Jr. Red Wings	3 – 2	OT	Peterborough Petes	Peterborough Memorial Centre

April 6	Detroit Jr. Red Wings	4 – 3	Peterborough Petes	Peterborough Memorial Centre

Detroit wins series 4 – 0

==== (E1) Kingston Frontenacs vs. (E4) Belleville Bulls ====
April 1	Kingston Frontenacs	1 – 10	Belleville Bulls	Yardmen Arena

April 3	Belleville Bulls	3 – 2	Kingston Frontenacs	Kingston Memorial Centre

April 4	Kingston Frontenacs	7 – 2	Belleville Bulls	Yardmen Arena

April 6	Belleville Bulls	6 – 3	Kingston Frontenacs	Kingston Memorial Centre

April 9	Belleville Bulls	3 – 6	Kingston Frontenacs	Kingston Memorial Centre

April 11	Kingston Frontenacs	5 – 8	Belleville Bulls	Yardmen Arena

Belleville wins series 4 – 2

==== (C2) Sudbury Wolves vs. (W2) Windsor Spitfires ====
March 31	Windsor Spitfires	2 – 6	Sudbury Wolves	Sudbury Community Arena

April 2	Windsor Spitfires	6 – 1	Sudbury Wolves	Sudbury Community Arena

April 6	Sudbury Wolves	3 – 4	Windsor Spitfires	Windsor Arena

April 7	Sudbury Wolves	5 – 1	Windsor Spitfires	Windsor Arena

April 9	Windsor Spitfires	2 – 9	Sudbury Wolves	Sudbury Community Arena

April 11	Sudbury Wolves	6 – 5	OT	Windsor Spitfires	Windsor Arena

Sudbury wins series 4 – 2

=== OHL semi-finals ===
==== (C1) Guelph Storm vs. (E4) Belleville Bulls ====
April 14	Belleville Bulls	2 – 3	OT	Guelph Storm	Guelph Memorial Gardens

April 16	Guelph Storm	3 – 1	Belleville Bulls	Yardmen Arena

April 18	Belleville Bulls	3 – 7	Guelph Storm	Guelph Memorial Gardens

April 20	Guelph Storm	7 – 4	Belleville Bulls	Yardmen Arena

Guelph wins series 4 – 0

==== (W1) Detroit Junior Red Wings vs. (C2) Sudbury Wolves ====
April 15	Sudbury Wolves	4 – 5	Detroit Jr. Red Wings	Joe Louis Arena

April 17	Sudbury Wolves	4 – 5	OT	Detroit Jr. Red Wings	Joe Louis Arena

April 18	Detroit Jr. Red Wings	3 – 4	Sudbury Wolves	Sudbury Community Arena

April 20	Detroit Jr. Red Wings	3 – 4	Sudbury Wolves	Sudbury Community Arena

April 22	Sudbury Wolves	2 – 1	OT	Detroit Jr. Red Wings	Joe Louis Arena

April 24	Detroit Jr. Red Wings	2 – 1	Sudbury Wolves	Sudbury Community Arena

April 25	Sudbury Wolves	4 – 11	Detroit Jr. Red Wings	Joe Louis Arena

Detroit wins series 4 – 3

=== J. Ross Robertson Cup ===
==== (C1) Guelph Storm vs. (W1) Detroit Junior Red Wings ====
April 28	Detroit Jr. Red Wings	3 – 5	Guelph Storm	Guelph Memorial Gardens

May 1	Guelph Storm	2 – 5	Detroit Jr. Red Wings	Joe Louis Arena

May 3	Detroit Jr. Red Wings	5 – 4	OT	Guelph Storm	Guelph Memorial Gardens

May 4	Guelph Storm	4 – 7	Detroit Jr. Red Wings	Joe Louis Arena

May 6	Detroit Jr. Red Wings	3 – 5	Guelph Storm	Guelph Memorial Gardens

May 8	Guelph Storm	4 – 5	Detroit Jr. Red Wings	Joe Louis Arena

Detroit wins series 4 – 2

== Awards ==
J. Ross Robertson Cup:	Detroit Junior Red Wings
Hamilton Spectator Trophy:	Guelph Storm
Leyden Trophy:	Kingston Frontenacs
Emms Trophy:	Guelph Storm
Bumbacco Trophy:	Detroit Junior Red Wings
Red Tilson Trophy:	David Ling, Kingston Frontenacs
Eddie Powers Memorial Trophy:	Marc Savard, Oshawa Generals
Matt Leyden Trophy:	Craig Hartsburg, Guelph Storm
Jim Mahon Memorial Trophy:	David Ling, Kingston Frontenacs
Max Kaminsky Trophy:	Bryan Berard, Detroit Junior Red Wings
OHL Goaltender of the Year:	Tyler Moss, Kingston Frontenacs
Jack Ferguson Award:	Daniel Tkaczuk, Barrie Colts
Dave Pinkney Trophy:	Mark McArthur and Andy Adams, Guelph Storm
OHL Executive of the Year:	Mike Kelly, Guelph Storm
Emms Family Award:	Bryan Berard, Detroit Junior Red Wings
F.W. 'Dinty' Moore Trophy:	David MacDonald, Sudbury Wolves
OHL Humanitarian of the Year:	Brad Brown, North Bay Centennials
William Hanley Trophy:	Vitali Yachmenev, North Bay Centennials
Leo Lalonde Memorial Trophy:	Bill Bowler, Windsor Spitfires
Bobby Smith Trophy:	Jamie Wright, Guelph Storm

== All-Star teams ==
The OHL All-Star Teams were selected by the OHL's General Managers.

=== First team ===
- Jeff O'Neill, Centre, Guelph Storm
- Dave Roche, Left Wing, Windsor Spitfires
- David Ling, Right Wing, Kingston Frontenacs
- Ed Jovanovski, Defence, Windsor Spitfires
- Bryan Berard, Defence, Detroit Jr. Red Wings
- Tyler Moss, Goaltender, Kingston Frontenacs
- Craig Hartsburg, Coach, Guelph Storm

=== Second team ===
- Marc Savard, Centre, Oshawa Generals
- Larry Courville, Left Wing, Oshawa Generals
- Todd Bertuzzi, Right Wing, Guelph Storm
- Wes Swinson, Defence, Kingston Frontenacs
- Jamie Rivers, Defence, Sudbury Wolves
- Mark McArthur, Goaltender, Guelph Storm
- Paul Maurice, Coach, Detroit Jr. Red Wings

=== Third team ===
- Bill Bowler, Centre, Windsor Spitfires
- Ethan Moreau, Left Wing, Sudbury Wolves
- Vitali Yachmenev, Right Wing, North Bay Centennials
- Rory Fitzpatrick, Defence, Sudbury Wolves
- Brad Brown, Defence, North Bay Centennials
- Matt Mullin, Goaltender, Sudbury Wolves
- Stan Butler, Coach, Oshawa Generals

== 1995 OHL Priority Selection ==
The Barrie Colts held the first overall pick in the 1995 Ontario Priority Selection and selected Daniel Tkaczuk from the Mississauga Senators. Tkaczuk was awarded the Jack Ferguson Award, awarded to the top pick in the draft.

Below are the players who were selected in the first round of the 1995 Ontario Hockey League Priority Selection.

#	Player	Nationality	OHL Team	Hometown	Minor Team
1	Daniel Tkaczuk (C)	Canada	Barrie Colts	Mississauga, Ontario	Mississauga Senators
2	Joe Thornton (C)	Canada	Sault Ste. Marie Greyhounds	St. Thomas, Ontario	St. Thomas Stars
3	Nick Boynton (D)	Canada	Ottawa 67's	Nobleton, Ontario	Caledon Canadians
4	Adam Colagiacomo (RW)	Canada	London Knights	Rexdale, Ontario	Royal York Rangers
5	Boyd Devereaux (C)	Canada	Kitchener Rangers	Seaforth, Ontario	Stratford Cullitons
6	Jason Ward (C)	Canada	Niagara Falls Thunder	Oshawa, Ontario	Oshawa Legionaires
7	Adam Mair (C)	Canada	Owen Sound Platers	Hamilton, Ontario	Ohsweken Golden Eagles
8	Patrick DesRochers (G)	Canada	Sarnia Sting	Penetanguishene, Ontario	Barrie Colts
9	Scott Barney (C)	Canada	Peterborough Petes	Courtice, Ontario	North York Rangers
10	Ryan Ready (LW)	Canada	Belleville Bulls	Peterborough, Ontario	Peterborough Jr. Bees
11	Luc Belliveau (D)	Canada	North Bay Centennials	Dieppe, New Brunswick	Wilcox Notre Dame
12	Jay Legault (LW)	Canada	Oshawa Generals	Peterborough, Ontario	Peterborough Bantams
13	Jeff Zehr (LW)	Canada	Windsor Spitfires	Tavistock, Ontario	Stratford Cullitons
14	Matt Price (LW)	Canada	Kingston Frontenacs	Holland Landing, Ontario	Newmarket 87's
15	Tyson Flinn (D)	Canada	Sudbury Wolves	Fredericton, New Brunswick	Fredericton Jr. Canadiens
16	Jesse Boulerice (D)	United States	Detroit Whalers	Mooers, New York	Hawkesbury Hawks
17	Brian Willsie (RW)	Canada	Guelph Storm	Belmont, Ontario	St. Thomas Stars

== See also ==
- List of OHA Junior A standings
- List of OHL seasons
- 1995 Memorial Cup
- 1995 NHL entry draft
- 1994 in sports
- 1995 in sports

Preceded by 1993–94 OHL season	OHL seasons	Succeeded by 1995–96 OHL season
