= Dan McCarthy (ice hockey) =

Canadian ice hockey player

- Born: April 7, 1958 (age 68) St. Marys, Ontario, Canada
- Height: 5 ft 9 in (175 cm)
- Weight: 185 lb (84 kg; 13 st 3 lb)
- Position: Centre
- Shot: Left
- Played for: New York Rangers; Wiener EV
- NHL draft: 223rd overall, 1978; New York Rangers
- Playing career: 1978–1986

Daniel Patrick McCarthy (born April 7, 1958) is a Canadian coach and former professional ice hockey player. He played 5 games in the National Hockey League with the New York Rangers during the 1980–81 season. The rest of his career, which lasted from 1978 to 1986, was mainly spent in the minor leagues.

== Career ==
McCarthy worked as the general manager of the Connecticut Wolves junior hockey team. He stepped down as head coach early in 2000–01 after leading the team to two MJHL semifinal appearances in the team's first two years of operation. McCarthy returned to the bench during 2007–08 season as head coach of the Hartford Jr. Wolfpack in the AJHL.

== Career statistics ==
=== Regular season and playoffs ===
			Regular season					Playoffs
Season	Team	League	GP	G	A	Pts	PIM	GP	G	A	Pts	PIM
1974–75	Stratford Cullitons	OHA-B	36	23	37	60	73	—	—	—	—	—
1975–76	Sudbury Wolves	OMJHL	65	17	30	47	23	17	1	7	8	8
1976–77	Sudbury Wolves	OMJHL	54	23	32	55	76	6	0	3	3	12
1977–78	Sudbury Wolves	OMJHL	68	30	51	82	96	—	—	—	—	—
1977–78	Toledo Goaldiggers	IHL	9	2	4	6	9	—	—	—	—	—
1978–79	Flint Generals	IHL	75	38	42	80	80	9	5	2	7	13
1979–80	New Haven Nighthawks	AHL	26	6	3	9	8	—	—	—	—	—
1979–80	Richmond Rifles	EHL	8	6	4	10	7	5	3	1	4	22
1980–81	New York Rangers	NHL	5	4	0	4	4	—	—	—	—	—
1980–81	New Haven Nighthawks	AHL	71	28	17	45	54	4	0	0	0	0
1981–82	Springfield Indians	AHL	78	26	32	58	57	—	—	—	—	—
1982–83	Birmingham South Stars	CHL	76	30	35	65	67	13	4	5	9	15
1983–4	Wiener EV	AUT	10	2	9	11	28	—	—	—	—	—
1983–84	Baltimore Skipjacks	AHL	27	8	11	19	8	—	—	—	—	—
1984–85	Baltimore Skipjacks	AHL	32	3	11	14	15	15	3	4	7	18
1985–86	Springfield Indians	AHL	33	7	9	16	46	—	—	—	—	—
AHL totals			267	78	83	161	188	19	3	4	7	22
NHL totals			5	4	0	4	4	—	—	—	—	—
