= Willie Huber =

German-Canadian ice hockey player (1958–2010)

- Born: January 15, 1958 Straßkirchen, West Germany
- Died: June 28, 2010 (aged 52) Hamilton, Ontario, Canada
- Height: 6 ft 5 in (196 cm)
- Weight: 225 lb (102 kg; 16 st 1 lb)
- Position: Defence
- Shot: Right
- Played for: Detroit Red Wings; New York Rangers; Vancouver Canucks; Philadelphia Flyers
- National team: Canada
- NHL draft: 9th overall, 1978; Detroit Red Wings
- Playing career: 1978–1988

Wilhelm Heinrich "Willie" Huber (January 15, 1958 – June 28, 2010) was a professional ice hockey defenceman who played ten seasons in the National Hockey League (NHL) with the Detroit Red Wings, New York Rangers, Vancouver Canucks and Philadelphia Flyers. While a member of the Red Wings, he represented the Campbell Conference in the 1983 NHL All-Star Game. When he joined the Red Wings in 1978, he was the biggest player (6'5", 225 lbs.) in NHL history.

== Playing career ==
Huber was drafted in the first round (9th overall) in the 1978 NHL Amateur Draft by the Detroit Red Wings after a decorated junior career. He won the Memorial Cup with the Hamilton Fincups in 1976, and represented Canada at the 1977 and 1978 World Junior Championships. A rare blend of size and skill, Huber stepped directly into the Wings' lineup the following season, notching 31 points and being named the team's Rookie of the Year.

For most of his career (until the arrival of Kjell Samuelsson in 1986) Huber was the largest player in the NHL at 6'5" and 228 lbs, towering over most other players in the league. Despite his size, however, Huber was primarily an offensive defender. Blessed with exceptional hands and skating ability, Huber was amongst the league's highest goal-scoring defenders in the early 1980s and a fixture on the Detroit powerplay. While he was also solid in his own zone, fans often - unfairly - expected him to be a nasty physical presence, which did not come as naturally to him.

Huber scored at least 14 goals and 40 points for Detroit every season between 1979 and 1983 and was one of the team's top players during a comparatively lackluster period of Red Wing history. Huber and Reed Larson formed one of the more dangerous blueline power-play combinations in the league during this period. He was chosen to represent Canada at the 1981 World Championships and helped the team to a 4th-place finish. In 1983, he was selected to play in the NHL All-Star Game.

Following a contract dispute with the Red Wings, Huber was dealt to the New York Rangers in the summer of 1983. He picked up where he left off offensively, but tore ligaments in his left knee midway through the season and was limited to 23 points in just 42 games. The following season, he tore ligaments in his right knee. As a result, his once-excellent mobility declined considerably, as did his offensive production. By 1985–86, he scored only 15 points in 70 games. He bounced back to score 30 points in 1986–87, but was traded to the Vancouver Canucks early in 1987–88. After a short, disappointing stint in Vancouver, he was dealt to the Philadelphia Flyers at the trade deadline, where he experienced a surprise resurgence with 13 points in 10 games.

However, following the season Philadelphia wanted him to take a pay cut, and after a resulting season-long holdout he retired in 1989. He finished his 10-year career with 104 goals and 321 points in 655 career games, along with 950 penalty minutes.

Following his days in hockey, he chose to remain near the game, working in the operations departments at Copps Coliseum, Hamilton Place, and the Hamilton Convention Centre.

== Death ==
Huber died of a heart attack on June 28, 2010, in Hamilton, Ontario at age 52.

== Personal ==
Huber was born in West Germany and moved with his family to Hamilton, Ontario when he was an infant. He was one of five children born to Sonia and Henry Huber. He was married to Dawn and had a step-daughter, Brittany. Holding both German and Canadian citizenship, he represented Canada in international competition.

== Career statistics ==
=== Regular season and playoffs ===
			Regular season					Playoffs
Season	Team	League	GP	G	A	Pts	PIM	GP	G	A	Pts	PIM
1975–76	Hamilton Fincups	OMJHL	58	2	8	10	64	14	2	11	13	28
1976–77	St. Catharines Fincups	OMJHL	36	10	24	34	111	10	2	4	6	29
1977–78	Hamilton Fincups	OMJHL	61	12	45	57	168	20	6	12	18	45
1978–79	Detroit Red Wings	NHL	68	7	24	31	114	—	—	—	—	—
1978–79	Kansas City Red Wings	CHL	10	2	7	9	12	—	—	—	—	—
1979–80	Detroit Red Wings	NHL	76	17	23	40	164	—	—	—	—	—
1979–80	Adirondack Red Wings	AHL	4	1	3	4	2	—	—	—	—	—
1980–81	Detroit Red Wings	NHL	80	15	34	49	130	—	—	—	—	—
1981–82	Detroit Red Wings	NHL	74	15	30	45	98	—	—	—	—	—
1982–83	Detroit Red Wings	NHL	74	14	29	43	106	—	—	—	—	—
1983–84	New York Rangers	NHL	42	9	14	23	60	4	1	1	2	9
1984–85	New York Rangers	NHL	49	3	11	14	55	2	1	0	1	2
1985–86	New York Rangers	NHL	70	7	8	15	85	16	3	2	5	16
1986–87	New York Rangers	NHL	66	8	22	30	68	6	0	2	2	6
1987–88	New York Rangers	NHL	11	1	3	4	14	—	—	—	—	—
1987–88	Vancouver Canucks	NHL	35	4	10	14	40	—	—	—	—	—
1987–88	Philadelphia Flyers	NHL	10	4	9	13	16	5	0	0	0	2
NHL totals			655	104	217	321	950	33	5	5	10	35

=== International ===
Year	Team	Event	GP	G	A	Pts	PIM
1977	Canada	WJC	7	1	2	3	13
1978	Canada	WJC	6	0	2	2	2
1981	Canada	WC	7	0	2	2	10
Junior totals			13	1	4	5	15
Senior totals			7	0	2	2	10

=== All-Star Games ===
Year	Location	G	A	P
1983	Uniondale	0	0	0
All-Star totals		0	0	0

- All stats taken from NHL.com

Preceded by Dale McCourt	Detroit Red Wings first-round draft pick 1978	Succeeded by Mike Foligno
