= Steve Hazlett =

Canadian ice hockey player

- Born: December 12, 1957 (age 67); Sarnia, Ontario, Canada
- Height: 5 ft 9 in (175 cm)
- Weight: 170 lb (77 kg; 12 st 2 lb)
- Position: Left wing
- Shot: Left
- Played for: CHL; Dallas Black Hawks; Tulsa Oilers; IHL; Fort Wayne Komets; NHL; Vancouver Canucks
- NHL draft: 76th overall, 1977; Vancouver Canucks
- Playing career: 1977–1983

Steve Hazlett
Medal record

Representing Canada

Men's ice hockey

World Junior Championships
Silver medal – second place	1977 Czechoslovakia	

Stephen Edward Hazlett (born December 12, 1957) is a Canadian former professional ice hockey player. He played one game in the National Hockey League with the Vancouver Canucks, on January 3, 1980 against the St. Louis Blues. The bulk of his playing career was spent in the minor Central Hockey League, where he primarily played with the Dallas Black Hawks. As a youth, he played in the 1970 Quebec International Pee-Wee Hockey Tournament with a minor ice hockey team from Toronto. He also played for the Canadian national junior team at the 1977 World Junior Championships, the first iteration of the tournament, winning a silver medal.

== Career statistics ==
=== Regular season and playoffs ===
			Regular season					Playoffs
Season	Team	League	GP	G	A	Pts	PIM	GP	G	A	Pts	PIM
1975–76	Hamilton Mountain A's	Midget	60	51	44	95	34	—	—	—	—	—
1975–76	Hamilton Fincups	OMJHL	5	3	4	7	0	14	5	3	8	7
1976–77	St. Catharines Fincups	OMJHL	66	42	58	100	56	14	6	6	12	11
1977–78	Hamilton Fincups	OMJHL	27	19	25	44	16	20	9	8	17	10
1977–78	Tulsa Oilers	CHL	15	1	2	3	10	—	—	—	—	—
1977–78	Fort Wayne Komets	IHL	4	3	1	4	4	—	—	—	—	—
1978–79	Dallas Black Hawks	CHL	76	44	32	76	36	9	7	1	8	2
1979–80	Dallas Black Hawks	CHL	61	23	23	46	43	—	—	—	—	—
1979–80	Vancouver Canucks	NHL	1	0	0	0	0	—	—	—	—	—
1980–81	Dallas Black Hawks	CHL	60	18	13	31	74	5	0	0	0	4
1981–82	Dallas Black Hawks	CHL	71	19	34	53	48	16	3	4	7	24
1982–83	Fort Wayne Komets	IHL	18	4	9	13	6	—	—	—	—	—
NHL totals			1	0	0	0	0	—	—	—	—	—
CHL totals			283	105	104	209	211	30	10	5	15	30

=== International ===
Year	Team	Event	GP	G	A	Pts	PIM
1977	Canada	WJC	7	6	0	6	6
Junior totals			7	6	0	6	6

== See also ==
- List of players who played only one game in the NHL
