= Mark Plantery =

Canadian ice hockey player

- Born: August 14, 1959 (age 66) St. Catharines, Ontario, Canada
- Height: 6 ft 0 in (183 cm)
- Weight: 195 lb (88 kg; 13 st 13 lb)
- Position: Defence
- Shot: Left
- Played for: Winnipeg Jets
- NHL draft: Undrafted
- Playing career: 1979–1986

Mark P. Plantery (born August 14, 1959) is a Canadian former professional ice hockey player who played 25 games in the National Hockey League (NHL) for the Winnipeg Jets during the 1980–81 season.

Plantery was born in St. Catharines, Ontario.

During the 1984–85 IHL season, he was traded from the Toledo Goaldiggers with Bill Joyce, to the Flint Generals in exchange for Jim Aldred and Don Waddell.

== Career statistics ==
=== Regular season and playoffs ===
			Regular season					Playoffs
Season	Team	League	GP	G	A	Pts	PIM	GP	G	A	Pts	PIM
1975–76	Thorold Blackhawks	NDJBHL	40	6	28	34	85	—	—	—	—	—
1976–77	St. Catharines Fincups	OMJHL	54	1	23	24	112	9	0	0	0	13
1977–78	Hamilton Fincups	OMJHL	51	0	6	6	91	20	1	2	3	29
1978–79	Brantford Alexanders	OMJHL	37	4	19	23	98	—	—	—	—	—
1978–79	Windsor Spitfires	OMJHL	27	3	15	18	43	7	0	2	2	17
1979–80	Tulsa Oilers	CHL	67	6	26	32	102	3	0	0	0	2
1980–81	Tulsa Oilers	CHL	50	3	15	18	77	—	—	—	—	—
1980–81	Winnipeg Jets	NHL	25	1	5	6	14	—	—	—	—	—
1981–82	Tulsa Oilers	CHL	76	9	40	49	65	3	1	0	1	0
1982–83	Sherbrooke Jets	AHL	75	6	25	31	51	—	—	—	—	—
1983–84	HC Gherdëina	ITA	28	4	20	24	53	6	7	8	15	6
1984–85	Flint Generals	IHL	44	3	17	20	44	4	0	0	0	5
1984–85	Toledo Goaldiggers	IHL	38	1	15	16	37	—	—	—	—	—
1985–86	Milwaukee Admirals	IHL	1	0	0	0	0	—	—	—	—	—
CHL totals			193	18	81	99	244	6	1	0	1	2
NHL totals			25	1	5	6	14	—	—	—	—	—

=== International ===
Year	Team	Event	GP	G	A	Pts	PIM
1977	Canada	WJC	7	0	1	1	6
Junior totals			7	0	1	1	6
