= Jay Johnston (ice hockey) =

Canadian ice hockey player (born 1958)

- Born: February 25, 1958 (age 68) Hamilton, Ontario, Canada
- Height: 5 ft 11 in (180 cm)
- Weight: 190 lb (86 kg; 13 st 8 lb)
- Position: Defence
- Shot: Left
- Played for: Washington Capitals
- NHL draft: 45th overall, 1978; Washington Capitals
- Playing career: 1978–1987

John Timothy "Jay" Johnston (born February 25, 1958) is a Canadian retired ice hockey defenceman. He played 8 games in the National Hockey League with the Washington Capitals during the 1980–81 and 1981–82 seasons. The rest of his career, which lasted from 1978 to 1987, was spent in the minor leagues. Johnston was selected by the Capitals 45th overall in the 1978 NHL Amateur Draft, and was born in Hamilton, Ontario.

== Career statistics ==
=== Regular season and playoffs ===
			Regular season					Playoffs
Season	Team	League	GP	G	A	Pts	PIM	GP	G	A	Pts	PIM
1975–76	Hamilton Mountain A's	SOJHL	36	1	25	26	70	—	—	—	—	—
1976–77	St. Catharines Fincups	OMJHL	65	8	20	28	146	14	0	6	6	49
1977–78	Hamilton Fincups	OMJHL	48	2	12	14	163	18	0	3	3	59
1978–79	Port Huron Flags	IHL	75	5	19	24	409	6	0	1	1	21
1979–80	Hershey Bears	AHL	69	3	20	23	229	14	0	4	4	42
1980–81	Washington Capitals	NHL	2	0	0	0	9	—	—	—	—	—
1980–81	Hershey Bears	AHL	61	1	11	12	187	4	0	0	0	4
1981–82	Washington Capitals	NHL	6	0	0	0	4	—	—	—	—	—
1981–82	Hershey Bears	AHL	67	4	9	13	228	5	0	0	0	22
1982–83	Hershey Bears	AHL	76	3	13	16	148	5	0	0	0	14
1983–84	Hershey Bears	AHL	69	1	9	10	231	—	—	—	—	—
1984–85	Fort Wayne Komets	IHL	69	1	12	13	211	13	1	4	5	36
1985–86	Fort Wayne Komets	IHL	78	1	13	14	176	15	0	1	1	47
1986–87	Fort Wayne Komets	IHL	31	0	8	8	92	—	—	—	—	—
AHL totals			342	12	62	74	1023	28	0	4	4	82
IHL totals			253	7	52	59	888	34	1	6	7	104
NHL totals			8	0	0	0	13	—	—	—	—	—
