= Dean DeFazio =

Canadian ice hockey player (born 1963)

- Born: April 16, 1963 (age 63) Ottawa, Ontario, Canada
- Height: 5 ft 11 in (180 cm)
- Weight: 185 lb (84 kg; 13 st 3 lb)
- Position: Left wing
- Shot: Left
- Played for: Pittsburgh Penguins
- NHL draft: 175th overall, 1981; Pittsburgh Penguins
- Playing career: 1983–1989

Dean DeFazio (born April 16, 1963) is a Canadian former professional ice hockey forward. During the 1983–84 NHL season he played 22 games in the National Hockey League for the Pittsburgh Penguins.

== Playing career ==
As a youth, he played in the 1975 Quebec International Pee-Wee Hockey Tournament with a minor ice hockey team from South Ottawa.

DeFazio began his junior career playing in the OMJHL playing for the Brantford Alexanders. Following his one season with Brantford, in which he accumulated 104 PIMs in 60 games, he was drafted by the Pittsburgh Penguins. the Penguins drafted DeFazio in the 9th round, 175th overall, in the 1981 NHL entry draft. DeFazio played the next two years in Juniors splitting time between the Alexanders, Sudbury Wolves, and Oshawa Generals, all of the OHL.

Following his last season in Juniors, Pittsburgh assigned him to the American Hockey League (AHL) to play for the Baltimore Skipjacks during the 1983-84 season. In December the Penguins called up DeFazio. He made his NHL debut on December 21, 1983 versus the New York Rangers. He played 22 games for the Penguins during the season totaling 2 assists, it would be the only NHL games he would play. DeFazio continued to play with the Skipjacks for two more years before moving on to play for the Newmarket Saints during the 1986-87 season. DeFazio returned to Baltimore the following season splitting time between the Skipjacks and the International Hockey League's Flint Spirits. He played one more season in the AHL this time for the New Haven Nighthawks, before going to Germany to play his final professional season for Straubing EHC in 1988.

== Personal information ==
After his retirement DeFazio became a firefighter. He also runs the DeFazio Hockey camp in Oakville, Ontario.

His son, Brandon DeFazio, had a two-way contract playing professional hockey with the Boston Bruins of the National Hockey League after moving on from the Vancouver Canucks.

== Career statistics ==
			Regular Season					Playoffs
Season	Team	League	GP	G	A	Pts	PIM	GP	G	A	Pts	PIM
1980–81	Brantford Alexanders	OHL	60	6	13	19	104	—	—	—	—	—
1981–82	Brantford Alexanders	OHL	10	2	6	8	30	—	—	—	—	—
1981–82	Sudbury Wolves	OHL	50	21	32	53	81	—	—	—	—	—
1982–83	Oshawa Generals	OHL	52	22	23	45	108	17	8	9	17	16
1983–84	Baltimore Skipjacks	AHL	46	18	13	31	114	10	2	2	4	19
1983–84	Pittsburgh Penguins	NHL	22	0	2	2	28	—	—	—	—	—
1984–85	Baltimore Skipjacks	AHL	78	10	17	27	88	10	2	1	3	64
1985–86	Baltimore Skipjacks	AHL	75	14	24	38	171	—	—	—	—	—
1986–87	Newmarket Saints	AHL	76	7	13	20	116	—	—	—	—	—
1987–88	New Haven Nighthawks	AHL	26	5	12	17	21	—	—	—	—	—
1987–88	Baltimore Skipjacks	AHL	22	1	2	3	75	—	—	—	—	—
1987–88	Flint Spirits	IHL	30	8	6	14	39	—	—	—	—	—
1988–89	Straubing EHC	GerObL	16	15	9	24	34	—	—	—	—	—
NHL totals			22	0	2	2	28	—	—	—	—	—
