= William Hanley Trophy =

Junior ice hockey award

- Sport: Ice hockey
- Awarded for: Most Sportsmanlike Player in OHL

History
- First award: 1975
- Most recent: Cole Beaudoin

The William Hanley Trophy is awarded annually by Ontario Hockey League to the most sportsmanlike player. It is named for Bill Hanley, a former secretary-manager of the Ontario Hockey Association who served in that capacity for twenty-five years. The William Hanley Trophy was first awarded in 1975. The winner of the William Hanley Trophy is nominated for the CHL Sportsman of the Year.

From 1961 to 1969, the Max Kaminsky Trophy was awarded to the most gentlemanly player.

== Winners ==
List of William Hanley Trophy winners, as the most sportsmanlike player.

denotes player also named CHL Sportsman of the Year

Season	Winner	Team
1974–75	Doug Jarvis	Peterborough Petes
1975–76	Dale McCourt	Hamilton Fincups
1976–77	Dale McCourt	St. Catharines Fincups
1977–78	Wayne Gretzky	Sault Ste. Marie Greyhounds
1978–79	Sean Simpson	Ottawa 67's
1979–80	Sean Simpson	Ottawa 67's
1980–81	John Goodwin	Sault Ste. Marie Greyhounds
1981–82	Dave Simpson	London Knights
1982–83	Kirk Muller	Guelph Platers
1983–84	Kevin Conway	Kingston Canadians
1984–85	Scott Tottle	Peterborough Petes
1985–86	Jason Lafreniere	Belleville Bulls
1986–87	Scott McCrory	Oshawa Generals
1986–87	Keith Gretzky	Hamilton Steelhawks
1987–88	Andrew Cassels	Ottawa 67's
1988–89	Kevin Miehm	Oshawa Generals
1989–90	Mike Ricci	Peterborough Petes
1990–91	Dale Craigwell	Oshawa Generals
1991–92	John Spoltore	North Bay Centennials
1992–93	Pat Peake	Detroit Junior Red Wings
1993–94	Jason Allison	London Knights
1994–95	Vitali Yachmenev	North Bay Centennials
1995–96	Jeff Williams	Guelph Storm
1996–97	Alyn McCauley	Ottawa 67's
1997–98	Matt Bradley	Kingston Frontenacs
1998–99	Brian Campbell	Ottawa 67's
1999–2000	Mike Zigomanis	Kingston Frontenacs
2000–01	Brad Boyes	Erie Otters
2001–02	Brad Boyes	Erie Otters
2002–03	Kyle Wellwood	Windsor Spitfires
2003–04	André Benoit	Kitchener Rangers
2004–05	Jeff Carter	Sault Ste. Marie Greyhounds
2005–06	Wojtek Wolski	Brampton Battalion
2006–07	Tom Pyatt	Saginaw Spirit
2007–08	Nick Spaling	Kitchener Rangers
2008–09	Cody Hodgson	Brampton Battalion
2009–10	Ryan Spooner	Peterborough Petes
2010–11	Jason Akeson	Kitchener Rangers
2011–12	Brandon Saad	Saginaw Spirit
2012–13	Tyler Graovac	Belleville Bulls
2013–14	Connor McDavid	Erie Otters
2014–15	Dylan Strome	Erie Otters
2015–16	Mike Amadio	North Bay Battalion
2016–17	Nick Suzuki	Owen Sound Attack
2017–18	Nick Suzuki	Owen Sound Attack
2018–19	Nick Suzuki	Owen Sound & Guelph
2019–20	Nick Robertson	Peterborough Petes
2020-21	Not awarded, season cancelled due to COVID-19 pandemic	
2021–22	Wyatt Johnston	Windsor Spitfires
2022–23	Evan Vierling	Barrie Colts
2023–24	Jett Luchanko	Guelph Storm
2024–25	Ilya Protas	Windsor Spitfires
2025–26	Cole Beaudoin	Barrie Colts

== Sportsman of the year (1961–1969) ==
List of Max Kaminsky Trophy winners from 1961–1969, as the most gentlemanly player.

Season	Winner	Team
1960–61	Bruce Draper	Toronto St. Michael's Majors
1961–62	Lowell MacDonald	Hamilton Tiger Cubs
1962–63	Paul Henderson	Hamilton Red Wings
1963–64	Fred Stanfield	St. Catharines Teepees
1964–65	Jimmy Peters	Hamilton Red Wings
1965–66	André Lacroix	Peterborough TPT's
1966–67	Mickey Redmond	Peterborough TPT's
1967–68	Tom Webster	Niagara Falls Flyers
1968–69	Réjean Houle	Montreal Junior Canadiens

== See also ==
- Frank J. Selke Memorial Trophy (QMJHL)
- Brad Hornung Trophy (WHL)
- List of Canadian Hockey League awards
