= Dale McCourt =

Canadian ice hockey player (born 1957)

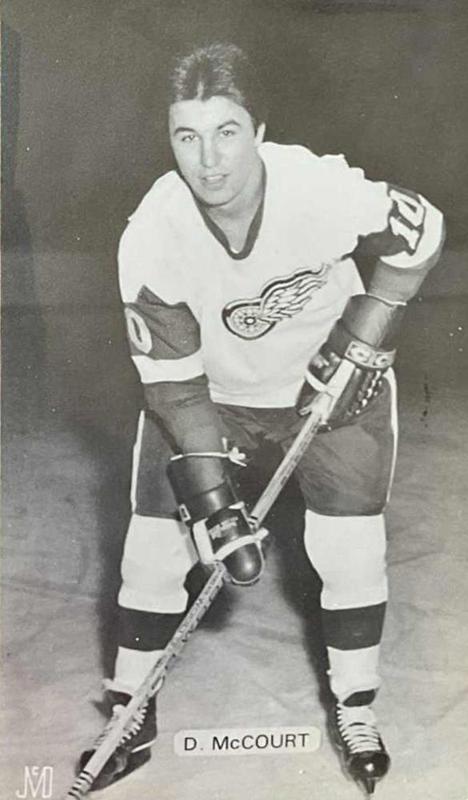
- Born: January 26, 1957 (age 69) Falconbridge, Ontario, Canada
- Height: 5 ft 10 in (178 cm)
- Weight: 180 lb (82 kg; 12 st 12 lb)
- Position: Centre
- Shot: Right
- Played for: Detroit Red Wings; Buffalo Sabres; Toronto Maple Leafs; HC Ambrì-Piotta
- National team: Canada
- NHL draft: 1st overall, 1977; Detroit Red Wings
- WHA draft: 35th overall, 1977; Indianapolis Racers
- Playing career: 1977–1991

Dale Allen McCourt (born January 26, 1957) is a Canadian former professional ice hockey forward. He played in the National Hockey League (NHL) with the Detroit Red Wings, Buffalo Sabres, and Toronto Maple Leafs between 1977 and 1984. He later played with HC Ambrì–Piotta in the Swiss Nationalliga A between 1985 and 1992. He was selected first overall by the Red Wings in the 1977 NHL amateur draft., becoming the first Canadian Indigenous player to be selected first in the NHL Draft. McCourt is a member of the Kitigan Zibi First Nation. Internationally McCourt played for the Canadian national team at the 1979 and 1981 World Championships.

== Junior hockey ==
McCourt played major junior in the Ontario Hockey Association (OHA, renamed OMJHL during his tenure, today's OHL). As a 15-year-old, he was already playing Tier II junior hockey when called up by the Sudbury Wolves for part of the 1972–73 OHA season. He joined the Hamilton Red Wings for the full 1973–74 OHA season, and was team captain by the time the (renamed) Hamilton Fincups won the 1975–76 OMJHL Championship and then the national 1976 Memorial Cup championship.

In 1976–77, McCourt led the relocated St. Catharines Fincups as the team won the OMJHL Regular Season Championship. That season, McCourt was awarded the Red Tilson Trophy as the league's Most Outstanding Player and was voted the nationwide CHL Player of the Year. Dale was also awarded the William Hanley Trophy as the OMJHL's Most Sportsmanlike Player in both 1975–76 and 1976–77.

In the 1977 World Junior Ice Hockey Championships, McCourt scored 18 points, a Canadian record he shares with Brayden Schenn and one point more than Eric Lindros and Wayne Gretzky.

McCourt was drafted 1st overall by the Detroit Red Wings in the 1977 NHL amateur draft. He made an impression on the Detroit Red Wings after being the first NHL amateur pick in 1977. He successfully scored 33 goals in the first year with the team.

== Professional career ==
McCourt led the Red Wings in scoring during his 1977–78 rookie season, finishing second to Calder Memorial Trophy winner Mike Bossy for rookie scoring in the NHL that year.

=== Legal battle ===
Before the start of the 1978–79 season, Red Wings general manager Ted Lindsay signed goaltender Rogatien Vachon of the Los Angeles Kings, who was a restricted free agent at that time. An NHL arbitrator ruled that McCourt should be the compensation given the Kings for Vachon's loss, but McCourt refused to report to the Kings. Ultimately, this led to McCourt suing the NHL, the National Hockey League Players' Association (NHLPA), the Red Wings, and the Kings to prevent being sent to the Los Angeles Kings as a part of any compensation package. During this lawsuit, McCourt remained playing for the Red Wings, finishing the season second in Red Wing scoring (by two points) for 1978-79. The matter was eventually resolved and McCourt remained in Detroit, but he felt betrayed by the fact that his own NHLPA, led by executive director Alan Eagleson, did not back him against the owners during the lawsuit. His legal case created a huge impact on sport and was the first sports case to challenge the antitrust laws during the bargaining agreement.

=== Trade ===
McCourt continued to be the Red Wings' top scorer in both his third (1979–80) and fourth (1980–81) seasons. Despite this, and while leading the team in scoring a third of the way through the 1981–82 season, management did not feel he had met their overall expectations and traded McCourt to the Buffalo Sabres in December 1981. McCourt produced at a point-a-game pace during his time with the Red Wings but the team failed to make the playoffs for three of his four years. He played with Buffalo before being claimed on waivers by the Toronto Maple Leafs in October 1983, finishing his NHL career at the end of the 1983–84 NHL season, with 478 points in 532 games played.

McCourt then played eight seasons for HC Ambrì-Piotta in the top Swiss league. Ambrì-Piotta retired McCourt's number 15 jersey.

== Hockey family ==
McCourt's brother Dan was an NHL linesman during the 1980s and early 1990s.

McCourt's uncle is Hockey Hall of Fame member George Armstrong. Armstrong won the Red Tilson Trophy as the OHA's Most Outstanding Player in both 1947–48 and 1949–50, the same award that McCourt received in 1976–77. Armstrong was the coach of the Toronto Marlboros when they won the national Memorial Cup Championship in 1973 and 1975, the same championship that McCourt won as a player with the Hamilton Fincups in 1976.

== Career statistics ==
=== Regular season and playoffs ===
			Regular season					Playoffs
Season	Team	League	GP	G	A	Pts	PIM	GP	G	A	Pts	PIM
1972–73	Welland Sabres	SOJHL	34	35	28	63	39	—	—	—	—	—
1972–73	Sudbury Wolves	OHA	26	6	11	17	0	4	0	1	1	0
1973–74	Hamilton Red Wings	OHA	69	20	38	58	45	—	—	—	—	—
1974–75	Hamilton Fincups	OMJHL	69	52	74	126	57	17	10	17	27	0
1975–76	Hamilton Fincups	OMJHL	66	55	84	139	19	14	20	8	28	12
1975–76	Hamilton Fincups	M-Cup	—	—	—	—	—	3	0	4	4	2
1976–77	St. Catharines Fincups	OMJHL	66	60	79	139	26	14	7	13	20	6
1977–78	Detroit Red Wings	NHL	76	33	39	72	10	7	4	2	6	2
1978–79	Detroit Red Wings	NHL	79	28	43	71	14	—	—	—	—	—
1979–80	Detroit Red Wings	NHL	80	30	51	81	12	—	—	—	—	—
1980–81	Detroit Red Wings	NHL	80	30	56	86	50	—	—	—	—	—
1981–82	Detroit Red Wings	NHL	26	13	14	27	6	—	—	—	—	—
1981–82	Buffalo Sabres	NHL	52	20	22	42	12	4	2	3	5	0
1982–83	Buffalo Sabres	NHL	62	20	32	52	10	10	3	2	5	4
1983–84	Buffalo Sabres	NHL	5	1	3	4	0	—	—	—	—	—
1983–84	Toronto Maple Leafs	NHL	72	19	24	43	10	—	—	—	—	—
1984–85	HC Ambrì–Piotta	NLB	40	33	26	59	—	—	—	—	—
1985–86	HC Ambrì–Piotta	NDA	32	42	17	59	22	—	—	—	—	—
1986–87	HC Ambrì–Piotta	NDA	36	25	28	53	42	5	5	2	7	20
1987–88	HC Ambrì–Piotta	NDA	36	29	20	49	22	6	6	6	12	4
1988–89	HC Ambrì–Piotta	NDA	36	41	24	65	39	6	1	4	5	0
1989–90	HC Ambrì–Piotta	NDA	28	18	26	44	26	2	0	0	0	0
1990–91	HC Ambrì–Piotta	NDA	35	19	14	33	58	—	—	—	—	—
1991–92	HC Ambrì–Piotta	NDA	5	4	1	5	2	—	—	—	—	—
NDA totals			208	178	130	308	211	19	12	12	24	24
NHL totals			532	194	284	478	124	21	9	7	16	6

=== International ===
Year	Team	Event	GP	G	A	Pts	PIM
1977	Canada	WJC	7	10	8	18	14
1979	Canada	WC	7	0	1	1	6
1981	Canada	WC	4	1	0	1	2
Junior totals			7	10	8	18	14
Senior totals			11	1	1	2	8

== Awards and honours ==
- Directorate Award, Best Forward, 1977 World Junior Ice Hockey Championships

Preceded by Fred Williams	Detroit Red Wings first-round draft pick 1977	Succeeded by Willie Huber
Preceded by Rick Green	NHL first overall draft pick 1977	Succeeded by Bobby Smith
Preceded by Peter Lee	CHL Player of the Year; 1977	Succeeded by Bobby Smith
Preceded by Paul Woods	Detroit Red Wings captain 1979–80	Succeeded by Errol Thompson; Reed Larson
