= Gerry Gray =

Gerry Gray may refer:

- Gerry Gray (soccer), former Canadian soccer player
- Gerry Gray (ice hockey), former Canadian ice hockey player

== See also ==
- Jerry Gray
- Jerry Gray (arranger)
