= Brantford Alexanders =

Canadian junior ice hockey team (1978–1984)

- City: Brantford, Ontario
- League: Ontario Hockey League
- Operated: 1978–1984
- Home arena: Brantford Civic Centre
- Colours: Red and white

Franchise history
- 1946–1953: Windsor Spitfires
- 1953–1960: Hamilton Tiger Cubs
- 1960–1974: Hamilton Red Wings
- 1974–1978: Hamilton/St. Catharines Fincups
- 1978–1984: Brantford Alexanders
- 1984–1988: Hamilton Steelhawks
- 1988–1996: Niagara Falls Thunder
- 1996–present: Erie Otters

The Brantford Alexanders were a junior ice hockey team in the Ontario Major Junior Hockey League and Ontario Hockey League from 1978 to 1984. The team was based in Brantford, Ontario, Canada.

== History ==
The Hamilton Fincups were relocated in 1978 becoming the Brantford Alexanders. The OMJHL junior team took the name of the OHA senior team which had played for two years prior, which in themselves were named for Brantford's most famous former resident, telephone pioneer Alexander Graham Bell. After two years in the OMJHL, the league changed names to the OHL and the Alexanders played four more seasons in Brantford, before moving back to Hamilton as the Steelhawks.

The Alexanders made the playoffs for five straight years after missing out its first year in Brantford. The team narrowly missed out on winning its division in 1980–81 by a single point. Their playoff nemeses were the Windsor Spitfires and the Sault Ste. Marie Greyhounds. Two years in a row they were eliminated by the Spitfires, followed by three years in a row at the hands of the Greyhounds.

In 1981, the Alexanders implemented country music into their image, when they began using the theme song, "Cowboys of the Ice" recorded by the band County Line.

In 1982–83 OHL season, forward Dave Gagner who graduated from North Park Collegiate and Vocational School, was awarded the Bobby Smith Trophy as the league's scholastic player of the year.

== Coaches ==
List of coaches:

- 1978–79: Dave Draper
- 1979–80: Ron Carroll
- 1980–81: Ron Carroll, Dave Draper, Ken Gratton
- 1981–82: Bep Guidolin, Dave Draper
- 1982–83: Dave Draper
- 1983–84: Dave Draper

== NHL alumni ==
There have been 29 alumni of the Alexanders to play in the National Hockey League (NHL):

- Perry Anderson
- Bruce Bell
- Allan Bester
- Mark Botell
- Mike Bullard
- Shayne Corson
- Tony Curtale
- Dean De Fazio
- Daryl Evans
- Dave Gagner
- Len Hachborn
- Dave Hannan
- Mike Hoffman
- Mark Hunter
- Jeff Jackson
- Randy Ladouceur
- Jason Lafreniere
- Rick LaFerriere
- Mike Lalor
- Kevin LaVallee
- Paul Marshall
- Mike Millar
- Ric Nattress
- Mark Plantery
- Bob Probert
- Chris Pusey
- Steve Smith
- Greg Terrion
- Rick Wamsley

== Season-by-season results ==
Regular season and playoffs results:

Legend: GP = Games played, W = Wins, L = Losses, T = Ties, Pts = Points, GF = Goals for, GA = Goals against

Memorial Cup champions	OHL champions	OHL finalists

Season	Regular season									Playoffs
Season	GP	W	L	T	Pts	Pct	GF	GA	Finish	Playoffs
1978–79	68	23	42	3	49	0.360	281	349	6th Emms	Did not qualify
1979–80	68	31	35	2	64	0.471	412	398	3rd Emms	Won division quarterfinal (Toronto Marlboros) 4–0; Lost division semifinal (Windsor Spitfires) 4–3
1980–81	68	34	34	0	68	0.500	350	354	2nd Emms	Lost division semifinal (Windsor Spitfires) 8–4
1981–82	68	25	41	2	52	0.382	293	313	5th Emms	Won division quarterfinal (London Knights) 6–2; Lost division semifinal (Sault Ste. Marie Greyhounds) 8–6
1982–83	70	34	33	3	71	0.507	275	282	4th Emms	Won division quarterfinal (London Knights) 6–0; Lost division semifinal (Sault Ste. Marie Greyhounds) 8–2
1983–84	70	39	28	3	81	0.579	303	235	2nd Emms	Lost division quarterfinal (Sault Ste. Marie Greyhounds) 8–4

== Arena ==
The Brantford Alexanders played home games at the Brantford Civic Centre from 1978 to 1984. The OHL All-Star game was hosted here in 1982.
