= Greg Redquest =

Canadian ice hockey player

- Born: July 30, 1956 (age 68); Toronto, Ontario, Canada
- Height: 5 ft 10 in (178 cm)
- Weight: 190 lb (86 kg; 13 st 8 lb)
- Position: Goaltender
- Caught: Left
- Played for: Pittsburgh Penguins
- NHL draft: 65th overall, 1976; Pittsburgh Penguins
- Playing career: 1976–1979

Gregory Redquest (born July 30, 1956) is a Canadian retired professional ice hockey goaltender who played one game in the National Hockey League with the Pittsburgh Penguins during the 1977–78 season. The rest of his career, which lasted from 1976 to 1979, was spent in the minor leagues.

== Career statistics ==
=== Regular season and playoffs ===
			Regular season									Playoffs
Season	Team	League	GP	W	L	T	MIN	GA	SO	GAA	SV%	GP	W	L	MIN	GA	SO	GAA	SV%
1973–74	Hamilton Red Wings	OHA	64	—	—	—	1226	111	1	5.43	—	—	—	—	—	—	—	—	—
1974–75	Hamilton Fincups	OMJHL	32	—	—	—	1920	123	1	3.82	—	8	—	—	470	27	1	3.45	—
1975–76	Hamilton Fincups	OMJHL	1	0	1	0	60	5	0	5.00	—	—	—	—	—	—	—	—	—
1975–76	Oshawa Generals	OMJHL	55	—	—	—	3053	217	0	4.26	—	5	2	3	274	25	0	5.48	—
1976–77	Columbus Owls	IHL	31	—	—	—	1596	105	1	3.95	—	3	—	—	95	6	0	3.79	—
1977–78	Pittsburgh Penguins	NHL	1	0	0	0	13	3	0	14.08	.700	—	—	—	—	—	—	—	—
1977–78	Flint Generals	IHL	1	1	0	0	60	3	0	3.00	—	—	—	—	—	—	—	—	—
1978–79	Jersey/Hampton Aces	NEHL	22	—	—	—	1150	90	0	4.70	—	—	—	—	—	—	—	—	—
NHL totals			1	0	0	0	13	3	0	14.08	.700	—	—	—	—	—	—	—	—

== See also ==
- List of players who played only one game in the NHL
