= Mike Keating (ice hockey) =

Canadian ice hockey player

- Born: January 21, 1957 (age 68); Toronto, Ontario, Canada
- Height: 6 ft 0 in (183 cm)
- Weight: 185 lb (84 kg; 13 st 3 lb)
- Position: Left wing
- Shot: Left
- Played for: New York Rangers
- National team: Canada
- NHL draft: 26th overall, 1977; New York Rangers
- WHA draft: 80th overall, 1977; Winnipeg Jets
- Playing career: 1977–1980

Michael Joseph Keating (born January 21, 1957) is a Canadian former professional ice hockey left winger who played in one National Hockey League game for the New York Rangers during the 1977–78 season, on January 29, 1978, against the Los Angeles Kings. The rest of his career, which lasted from 1977 to 1980, was spent in the minor leagues. As a youth, he played in the 1968, 1969, and 1970 Quebec International Pee-Wee Hockey Tournaments with minor ice hockey team from Scarborough, Toronto.

== Career statistics ==
=== Regular season and playoffs ===
			Regular season					Playoffs
Season	Team	League	GP	G	A	Pts	PIM	GP	G	A	Pts	PIM
1973–74	Seneca Flyers	OPJAHL	44	38	51	89	66	—	—	—	—	—
1974–75	Hamilton Fincups	OMJHL	53	31	24	55	83	16	3	5	8	41
1975–76	Hamilton Fincups	OMJHL	66	42	37	79	82	14	7	4	11	8
1975–76	Hamilton Fincups	M-Cup	—	—	—	—	—	3	1	1	2	0
1976–77	St. Catharines Fincups	OMJHL	65	52	61	113	96	11	5	4	9	19
1977–78	New York Rangers	NHL	1	0	0	0	0	—	—	—	—	—
1977–78	New Haven Nighthawks	AHL	62	15	9	24	12	2	0	0	0	0
1978–79	New Haven Nighthawks	AHL	1	0	0	0	0	—	—	—	—	—
1978–79	Toledo Goaldiggers	IHL	66	26	27	53	54	6	4	2	6	14
1979–80	Dayton Gems	IHL	3	1	2	3	0	—	—	—	—	—
1979–80	Toledo Goaldiggers	IHL	63	31	29	60	58	4	2	0	2	8
AHL totals			63	15	9	24	12	2	0	0	0	0
IHL totals			132	58	58	116	112	10	6	2	8	22
NHL totals			1	0	0	0	0	—	—	—	—	—

=== International ===
Year	Team	Event	GP	G	A	Pts	PIM
1977	Canada	WJC	7	0	2	2	4
Junior totals			7	0	2	2	4

== See also ==
- List of players who played only one game in the NHL
