= Greg Terrion =

Canadian ice hockey player (1960–2018)

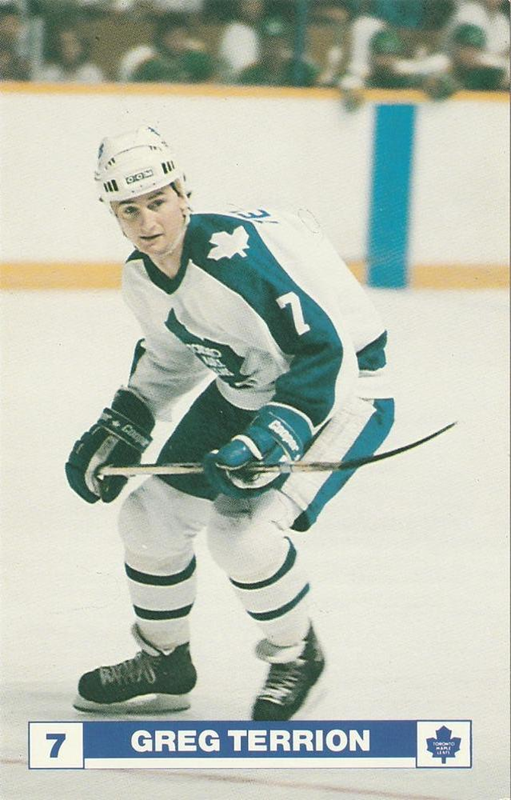
- Terrion in 1986 postcard
- Born: May 2, 1960 Marmora, Ontario, Canada
- Died: September 28, 2018 (aged 58) Marmora, Ontario, Canada
- Height: 5 ft 11 in (180 cm)
- Weight: 190 lb (86 kg; 13 st 8 lb)
- Position: Left wing
- Shot: Left
- Played for: Los Angeles Kings; Toronto Maple Leafs
- NHL draft: 33rd overall, 1980; Los Angeles Kings
- Playing career: 1980–1988

Patrick Gregory Terrion (May 2, 1960 – September 28, 2018) was a Canadian professional ice hockey player who played 561 games in the National Hockey League (NHL). His jersey number was 7 and he played for the Toronto Maple Leafs and the Los Angeles Kings.

Terrion was originally drafted by Los Angeles in the second round in the 1980 NHL entry draft, and played two seasons for the club before a trade on October 19, 1982 sent him to the Maple Leafs in exchange for a fourth round draft pick in 1983. He played six seasons for Toronto. He died of a heart attack at the age of 58 on September 28, 2018.

== Career statistics ==
			Regular season					Playoffs
Season	Team	League	GP	G	A	Pts	PIM	GP	G	A	Pts	PIM
1976–77	Belleville Bulls	OHA-B	20	15	17	32	—	—	—	—	—	—
1977–78	Hamilton Fincups	OMJHL	64	11	30	41	43	20	4	5	9	26
1978–79	Brantford Alexanders	OMJHL	59	27	28	55	48	—	—	—	—	—
1979–80	Brantford Alexanders	OMJHL	67	44	78	122	13	11	4	7	11	12
1980–81	Los Angeles Kings	NHL	73	12	25	37	99	3	1	0	1	4
1981–82	Los Angeles Kings	NHL	61	15	22	37	23	—	—	—	—	—
1982–83	Toronto Maple Leafs	NHL	74	16	16	32	59	4	1	2	3	2
1982–83	New Haven Nighthawks	AHL	4	0	1	1	7	—	—	—	—	—
1983–84	Toronto Maple Leafs	NHL	79	15	24	39	36	—	—	—	—	—
1984–85	Toronto Maple Leafs	NHL	72	14	17	31	20	—	—	—	—	—
1985–86	Toronto Maple Leafs	NHL	76	10	22	32	31	10	0	3	3	17
1986–87	Toronto Maple Leafs	NHL	67	7	8	15	6	13	0	2	2	14
1987–88	Toronto Maple Leafs	NHL	59	4	16	20	65	5	0	2	2	4
1987–88	Newmarket Saints	AHL	4	1	3	4	6	—	—	—	—	—
1988–89	Newmarket Saints	AHL	60	15	34	49	64	4	0	1	1	2
NHL totals			561	93	150	243	339	35	2	9	11	41
