= Glen Richardson =

Canadian ice hockey player

- Born: September 20, 1955 (age 69); Barrie, Ontario, Canada
- Height: 6 ft 2 in (188 cm)
- Weight: 200 lb (91 kg; 14 st 4 lb)
- Position: Left wing
- Shot: Left
- Played for: Vancouver Canucks
- NHL draft: 64th overall, 1975; Vancouver Canucks
- WHA draft: 38th overall, 1975; Winnipeg Jets
- Playing career: 1975–1978

Glen Gordon Richardson (born September 20, 1955) is a retired professional ice hockey player who played 24 games in the National Hockey League, all with the Vancouver Canucks. Selected by the Canucks in the 1975 NHL Amateur Draft, he joined the team that year, splitting the season between the NHL and the minor Central Hockey League (CHL). Richardson would play two more seasons in the CHL before retiring in 1978.

== Career ==
=== Junior career ===
Richardson began his career with the Kitchener Rangers of the Ontario Hockey Association (OHA). He played two seasons with the team from 1972–1974, playing in 78 games while recording 32 points (13 goals and 19 assists). He played the next two seasons with the Hamilton Red Wings, who renamed to the Hamilton Fincups in his second season with the club, scoring 78 points in 93 games, 72 in his final year.

=== Professional career ===
Drafted 38th overall to Vancouver in 1975, he made his debut in 1975-76, notching 9 points (3 goals, 6 assists) in the 24 games he played. He was a -1 with 19 penalty minutes. In the same year, Richardson went to the Tulsa Oilers of the Central Hockey League (CHL), where he played the rest of his career. Playing 186 contests with the Oilers, Richardson had a total of 117 points.

== Career statistics ==
=== Regular season and playoffs ===
			Regular season					Playoffs
Season	Team	League	GP	G	A	Pts	PIM	GP	G	A	Pts	PIM
1972–73	Kitchener Rangers	OHA	40	4	6	10	25	—	—	—	—	—
1973–74	Hamilton Red Wings	OHA	65	11	17	28	54	—	—	—	—	—
1974–75	Hamilton Fincups	OMJHL	66	29	43	72	119	17	9	12	21	8
1975–76	Vancouver Canucks	NHL	24	3	6	9	19	—	—	—	—	—
1975–76	Tulsa Oilers	CHL	45	10	16	26	27	9	4	1	5	4
1976–77	Tulsa Oilers	CHL	72	24	38	62	27	9	1	2	3	4
1977–78	Tulsa Oilers	CHL	69	11	18	29	24	7	2	1	3	12
CHL totals			186	45	72	117	78	25	7	4	11	20
NHL totals			24	3	6	9	19	—	—	—	—	—
