= Sudbury Wolves =

Ontario Hockey League team in Sudbury

- City: Greater Sudbury, Ontario
- League: Ontario Hockey League
- Conference: Eastern
- Division: Central
- Founded: 1962 (NOJHA); 1972 (OHL)
- Home arena: Sudbury Community Arena
- Colours: Blue, white and grey
- Owner: Dario Zulich
- General manager: Rob Papineau
- Head coach: Scott Barney
- Affiliates: Espanola Paper Kings (NOJHL)
- Website: sudburywolves.com

Franchise history
- 1945–1960: Barrie Flyers
- 1960–1972: Niagara Falls Flyers
- 1972–present: Sudbury Wolves

Current uniform

The Sudbury Wolves are a Canadian junior ice hockey team based in Greater Sudbury, Ontario, playing in the Ontario Hockey League (OHL).

Sudbury has had various hockey teams competing at junior and senior ice hockey levels known as the "Wolves" (or "Cub Wolves"). The current junior franchise came into existence in 1972, when local businessman Bud Burke purchased the Niagara Falls Flyers and relocated the team to Sudbury.

The current franchise has never won the Memorial Cup, nor has it captured the J. Ross Robertson Cup. Despite this lack of championships, the team has been one of the top development franchises in major junior over its history, with over 120 players drafted in to the National Hockey League (NHL) since 1973. The Wolves have been a central part of Sudbury's history for decades, and the team is among the most iconic junior hockey franchises in all of North America.

== History ==
Sudbury has had a hockey team known as the Wolves or Cub Wolves nearly every year since around WWI. This team name was informally adopted around 1920 as the "Wolves of the North", likely a reference to the "voracity and tenacity that typified the play of these men from Sudbury."

The Sudbury Cub Wolves junior team began play in the 1920s as a member of the Nickel Belt Hockey League. Under the management of Max Silverman, and coached by Sam Rothschild, the Cub Wolves won the Memorial Cup in 1932 with a roster that featured future NHL players such as Hector "Toe" Blake, Nakina Smith, and Adélard Lafrance. In 1935, the Cub Wolves lost in the Memorial Cup finals to the Winnipeg Monarchs.

A senior team competing under the banner of the Sudbury Wolves, again coached by Silverman, have twice been chosen to be Canada's representatives at the Ice Hockey World Championships, winning the title for Canada in 1938 and the silver medal in 1949. An iteration of the Wolves competed as the Eastern Canada entry at the 1954 Allan Cup senior national championship, falling to the Penticton Vees from Western Canada.

A professional Sudbury Wolves team competed in the Eastern Professional Hockey League (EPHL) from 1959 until the league folded in 1963. Players such as Don Cherry, Dave Keon, and Gerry Cheevers suited up for the club during its brief existence.

A junior version of the Wolves emerged in the early 1960s as a member of the Northern Ontario Junior Hockey Association, winning the league championship in 1969 and 1971.

The OHL - then known as the Ontario Hockey Association and later the Ontario Major Junior Hockey League - arrived in Sudbury in 1972 when local businessman Bud Burke, who was a shareholder in the NOJHL Wolves, purchased the Niagara Falls Flyers from Leighton "Hap" Emms and moved the team to Northern Ontario. In 1975-76, the Wolves, coached by Jerry Toppazzini, who won the Matt Leyden Trophy that season, won Hamilton Spectator Trophy for having the best regular season record in the league with a roster of future NHL players such as Randy Carlyle, Ron Duguay, Rod Schutt, and Mike Foligno. Sudbury advanced to the 1975-76 OHL finals, but lost to the Hamilton Fincups in five games. In 1979, Burke sold the team to a large ownership group headed by future Hockey Canada board of directors chair Joe Drago. From 1973 to 1979, a young Joe Bowen began his broadcasting career covering the Wolves on local Sudbury radio.

The Wolves were the worst performing team in the entire Canadian Hockey League (CHL) in the 1980s, making the playoffs only once and not winning a single postseason game in the process. The club managed to develop some notable players in this era, such as Pat Verbeek and Jeff Brown. A turning point in franchise history came in 1986 when local businessman Ken Burgess purchased the struggling club and initiated a major organizational turnaround. Sam McMaster was hired as general manager in 1988, and under his direction the team experienced renewed success, winning its first playoff series since 1979–80 when they defeated the Oshawa Generals in the first round of 1991–92 OHL playoffs. McMaster was named OHL Executive of the Year in 1989–90.

From the early 1990s to the mid-2000s, the Wolves experienced mixed success. The club lost in Game 7 of the 1994–95 OHL semi-finals to the Detroit Junior Red Wings. A string of disappointing seasons came to an end in 2006–07 - the Wolves' 35th anniversary - when the team advanced to the OHL Finals, but ultimately lost to the Plymouth Whalers in six games. Coached by Mike Foligno, the Wolves roster that season featured several future NHL players, namely Marc Staal, Nick Foligno, Adam McQuaid, and Akim Aliu.

From 2007 to 2016, the team generally struggled, including posting the worst season in franchise history in 2014–15. In August 2012, the Wolves were sent to represent Canada at the 2012 Junior Club World Cup. Sudbury defeated the Waterloo Black Hawks of the United States Hockey League in the championship finals by a score of 2-0. In 2016, the Burgess family, at the time the longest-serving ownership group in the OHL, sold the team to Sudbury businessman Dario Zulich. Since Zulich's takeover, the team has been moving in a positive direction, drafting players such as Quinton Byfield and Ukko-Pekka Luukkonen, and winning a regular season division title in 2019–20.

== Championships ==
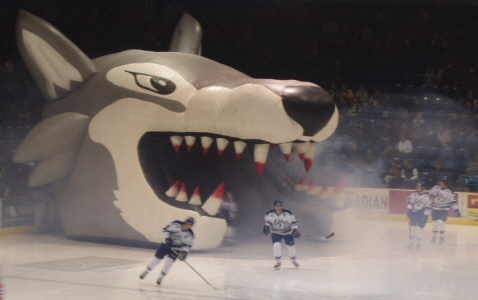
Sudbury Wolves make an entrance on home ice

The current Sudbury Wolves have never won the OHL championship, and have never participated in the Memorial Cup tournament. The team currently holds the third-longest Memorial Cup championship drought in the CHL, and the longest in the OHL.

The team has twice lost in the OHL finals, once in 1976 and again in 2007, winning the 1976 Leyden Trophy and the 2007 Bobby Orr Trophy in the process. The Wolves have twice won the Emms Trophy as the regular season Central Division champions, first in 2000-01 and then in 2019-20.

J. Ross Robertson Cup

- 1976 Lost to Hamilton Fincups
- 2007 Lost to Plymouth Whalers

Bobby Orr Trophy

- 2006–2007 Eastern Conference Champions

NOJHA McNamara Trophy

- 1969 Defeated Sault Ste. Marie Greyhounds
- 1971 Defeated Sault Ste. Marie Greyhounds

NOJHA Regular Season Champions

- 1970–1971 80 pts.

Hamilton Spectator Trophy

- 1975–1976 102 points

Leyden Trophy

- 1975–1976 Leyden division

Emms Trophy

- 2000–2001 Central division
- 2019–2020 Central division

Junior Club World Cup

- 2012 Defeated Waterloo Black Hawks

== Coaches ==
Jerry Toppazzini was awarded the Matt Leyden Trophy as the league's coach of the year in 1976, leading his team to a first-place finish in the regular season.

List of Sudbury Wolves coaches with multiple years in parentheses.

- 1972–1973 - B.MacKenzie, L.Rubic, T.Boyce
- 1973–1974 - Mac MacLean
- 1974–1975 - Stu Duncan
- 1975–1977 - Jerry Toppazzini (2)
- 1977–1978 - Marcel Clements, Andy Laing
- 1978–1981 - Andy Laing (4)
- 1981–1982 - Joe Drago
- 1982–1983 - Ken Gratton, M.Clements, B.Harris
- 1983–1984 - Billy Harris (2), Andy Spruce
- 1984–1985 - Andy Spruce (2)
- 1985–1986 - Bob Strumm, Wayne Maxner
- 1986–1987 - Guy Blanchard
- 1987–1988 - John Wallin, Ken MacKenzie
- 1988–1992 - Ken MacKenzie (5)
- 1992–1995 - Glenn Merkosky (4)
- 1995–1996 - Glenn Merkosky, Todd Lalonde
- 1996–1997 - Todd Lalonde (3)
- 1997–1998 - Todd Lalonde, Tom Watt
- 1998–1999 - Reg Higgs
- 1999–2003 - Bert Templeton (4)
- 2003–2009 - Mike Foligno (5)
- 2009-2010 - Bryan Verreault
- 2009-2010 - Mike Foligno
- 2010–2013 - Trent Cull
- 2013–2015 - Paul Fixter
- 2015–2017 - David Matsos (2)
- 2017–2020 - Cory Stillman (3)
- 2021–2022 - Craig Duncanson
- 2022–2023 - Derek MacKenzie
- 2023-2024 - Ken MacKenzie
- 2024–present - Scott Barney

== Players ==
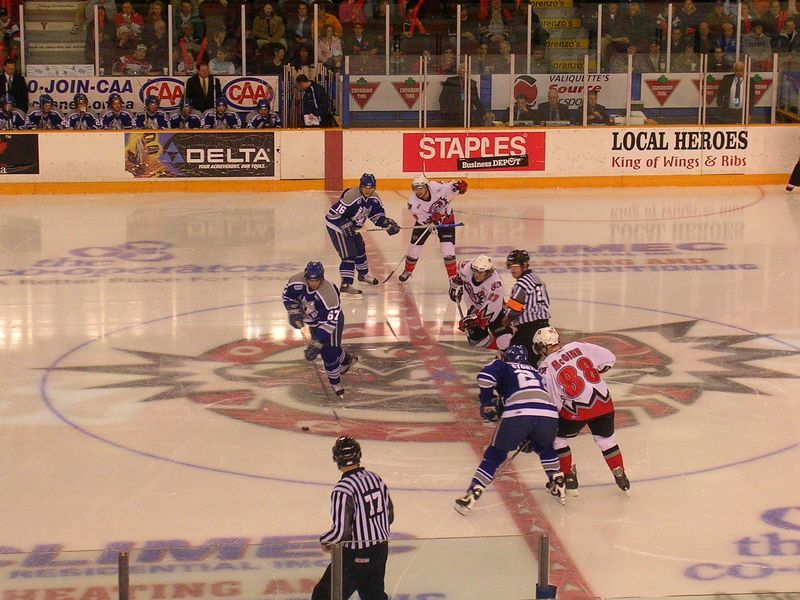
Sudbury Wolves against the Ottawa 67's in Ottawa

The Sudbury Wolves have retired six players' numbers, and have had over 120 players drafted to the NHL.

=== Retired numbers ===
- 6 Randy Carlyle
- 8 Rod Schutt
- 10 Ron Duguay
- 14 Marc Staal
- 15 Dale Hunter
- 17 Mike Foligno

=== Award winners ===
- 1975–76 - Jim Bedard, Dave Pinkney Trophy
- 1978–79 - Mike Foligno, Red Tilson Trophy, Eddie Powers Memorial Trophy, Jim Mahon Memorial Trophy
- 1981–82 - Pat Verbeek, Emms Family Award
- 1984 - Dave Moylan, Jack Ferguson Award
- 1985–86 - Jeff Brown, Max Kaminsky Trophy
- 1987 - John Uniac, Jack Ferguson Award
- 1993–94 - Jamie Rivers, Max Kaminsky Trophy
- 1994–95 - David MacDonald, F. W. "Dinty" Moore Trophy
- 1998–99 - Norm Milley, Jim Mahon Memorial Trophy
- 1998–99 - Ryan McKie, Dan Snyder Memorial Trophy
- 2000–01 - Alexei Semenov, Max Kaminsky Trophy
- 2004–05 - Benoit Pouliot, CHL Rookie of the Year, Emms Family Award
- 2006–07 - Marc Staal, Max Kaminsky Trophy, Wayne Gretzky 99 Award
- 2008 - John McFarland, Jack Ferguson Award
- 2009-10 - John Kurtz, Mickey Renaud Captain's Trophy
- 2011–12 - Michael Sgarbossa, Eddie Powers Memorial Trophy
- 2012-13 - Connor Burgess, Ivan Tennant Memorial Award
- 2015 - David Levin, Jack Ferguson Award
- 2018 - Quinton Byfield, Jack Ferguson Award
- 2018–19 - Ukko-Pekka Luukkonen, Red Tilson Trophy, OHL Goaltender of the Year
- 2018–19 - Quinton Byfield, Emms Family Award, CHL Rookie of the Year
- 2021 - Quentin Musty, Jack Ferguson Award
- 2023-24 - David Goyette, Eddie Powers Memorial Trophy, Jim Mahon Memorial Trophy

=== NHL alumni ===
- Akim Aliu
- Mike Allison
- Derek Armstrong
- John Baby
- Ryan Barnes
- Don Beaupre
- Jim Bedard
- Adam Bennett
- Jason Bonsignore
- Kip Brennan
- Jeff Brown
- Quinton Byfield
- Kyle Capobianco
- Randy Carlyle
- Tom Colley
- Brandon Convery
- Frank Corrado
- Dean De Fazio
- Paul DiPietro
- Ron Duguay
- Craig Duncanson
- Ben Dunn
- Dave Farrish
- Fedor Fedorov
- Mike Fisher
- Rory Fitzpatrick
- Marcus Foligno
- Mike Foligno
- Nick Foligno
- Jim Fox
- Dan Frawley
- Sean Gagnon
- David Goverde
- Josh Gratton
- Scott Gruhl
- Richie Hansen
- Randy Hillier
- Randy Holt
- Dale Hunter
- Dave Hunter
- Mike Hudson
- Dan Jancevski
- Wes Jarvis
- Jason Jaspers
- Chris Kelly
- Chris Kontos
- Marc Laforge
- Josh Leivo
- Mike Lenarduzzi
- Ukko-Pekka Luukkonen
- Kevin MacDonald
- Derek MacKenzie
- Paul Mara
- Hector Marini
- Mike Marson
- Dan McCarthy
- Dale McCourt
- John McFarland
- Brian McGrattan
- Jay McKee
- Alex McKendry
- Don McLean
- Adam McQuaid
- Ken McRae
- Max Middendorf
- Norm Milley
- Mike Moher
- Barrie Moore
- Ethan Moreau
- Glen Murray
- Zdenek Nedved
- Sean O'Donnell
- Michael Peca
- Michael Pezzetta
- Isaak Phillips
- Randy Pierce
- Benoit Pouliot
- Taylor Pyatt
- Andrew Raycroft
- Jamie Rivers
- Shawn Rivers
- Adam Ruzicka
- Warren Rychel
- Mike Sands
- Rod Schutt
- Alexei Semenov
- Jason Simon
- Brad Smith
- Mike Smith
- Marc Staal
- Steve Staios
- Zack Stortini
- John Tanner
- Eric Vail
- Steve Valiquette
- Pat Verbeek
- Dave Watson
- Dennis Wideman
- Mike Wilson

== Season-by-season results ==
Regular season and playoffs results:

- 1962–1972: Northern Ontario Junior Hockey Association
- 1972–1974: Ontario Hockey Association Major Junior A Series
- 1974–1980: Ontario Major Junior Hockey League
- 1980–present: Ontario Hockey League

Legend: GP = Games played, W = Wins, L = Losses, T = Ties, OTL = Overtime losses, SL = Shoot-out losses, Pts = Points, GF = Goals for, GA = Goals against

Memorial Cup champions	League champions	League finalists

Season	Regular season											Playoffs
Season	GP	W	L	T	OTL	SOL	Pts	Pct	GF	GA	Finish	Playoffs
1962–63	40	11	29	0	–	–	22	0.275	127	222	5th NOJHA	Did not qualify
1963–64	39	26	12	1	–	–	53	0.679	213	170	2nd NOJHA	
1964–65	40	7	33	0	–	–	14	0.175	167	275	5th NOJHA	Did not qualify
1965–66	40	23	16	1	–	–	47	0.588	267	211	3rd NOJHA	
1966–67	40	21	19	0	–	–	42	0.525	213	189	3rd NOJHA	
1967–68	40	19	19	2	–	–	40	0.500	211	198	4th NOJHA	
1968–69	48	31	15	2	–	–	64	0.667	229	160	2nd NOJHA	
1969–70	48	33	11	4	–	–	70	0.729	341	192	2nd NOJHA	
1970–71	48	39	7	2	–	–	80	0.833	353	159	1st NOJHA	
1971–72	52	23	23	6	–	–	52	0.500	214	194	2nd NOJHA	
Wolves joined the Ontario Hockey Association Major Junior A Series by purchase of the Niagara Falls Flyers
1972–73	63	21	32	10	–	–	52	0.413	289	379	7th OHA	Lost quarterfinals (Ottawa 67's) 8–0
1973–74	70	31	26	13	–	–	75	0.536	298	288	5th OHA	Lost quarterfinals (Kitchener Rangers) 8–0
1974–75	70	31	29	10	–	–	72	0.514	324	289	5th OHA	Won quarterfinals (Ottawa 67's) 8–6; Lost semifinals (Toronto Marlboros) 9–7
1975–76	66	47	11	8	–	–	102	0.773	384	224	1st Leyden	Won quarterfinals (Sault Ste. Marie Greyhounds) 9–5; Won semifinals (Ottawa 67's) 8–2; Lost OMJHL finals (Hamilton Fincups) 8–2
1976–77	66	38	24	4	–	–	80	0.606	385	290	2nd Leyden	Lost quarterfinals (Kingston Canadians) 4–1–1
1977–78	68	16	42	10	–	–	42	0.309	255	377	6th Leyden	Did not qualify
1978–79	68	40	27	1	–	–	81	0.596	397	361	2nd Leyden	Won quarterfinals (Oshawa Generals) 8–2; Lost semifinals (Peterborough Petes) 8–2
1979–80	68	33	33	2	–	–	68	0.500	299	309	5th Leyden	Won division quarterfinals (Kingston Canadians) 3–0; Lost quarterfinals (Peterborough Petes) 4–3
1980–81	68	20	45	3	–	–	43	0.316	284	380	6th Leyden	Did not qualify
1981–82	68	19	48	1	–	–	39	0.287	274	401	7th Emms	Did not qualify
1982–83	70	15	55	0	–	–	30	0.214	269	422	7th Emms	Did not qualify
1983–84	70	19	50	1	–	–	39	0.279	287	427	8th Emms	Did not qualify
1984–85	66	17	46	3	–	–	37	0.280	224	348	8th Emms	Did not qualify
1985–86	66	29	33	4	–	–	62	0.470	293	330	5th Emms	Lost division quarterfinals (Guelph Platers) 8–0
1986–87	66	20	44	2	–	–	42	0.318	285	377	8th Emms	Did not qualify
1987–88	66	17	48	1	–	–	35	0.265	208	339	8th Emms	Did not qualify
1988–89	66	23	36	7	–	–	53	0.402	262	334	7th Emms	Did not qualify
1989–90	66	36	23	7	–	–	79	0.598	295	267	3rd Emms	Lost division quarterfinals (Owen Sound Platers) 4–3
1990–91	66	33	28	5	–	–	71	0.538	288	265	6th Leyden	Lost division quarterfinals (Oshawa Generals) 4–1
1991–92	66	33	27	6	–	–	72	0.545	331	320	4th Leyden	Won division quarterfinals (Oshawa Generals) 4–3; Lost quarterfinals (North Bay Centennials) 4–0
1992–93	66	31	30	5	–	–	67	0.508	291	300	4th Leyden	Won division quarterfinals (Newmarket Royals) 4–3; Lost quarterfinals (Peterborough Petes) 4–3
1993–94	66	34	26	6	–	–	74	0.561	299	275	3rd Leyden	Won division quarterfinals (Oshawa Generals) 4–1; Lost division semifinals (Ottawa 67's) 4–2
1994–95	66	43	17	6	–	–	92	0.697	314	208	2nd Central	Won division quarterfinals (Kitchener Rangers) 4–1; Won quarterfinals (Windsor Spitfires) 4–2; Lost semifinals (Detroit Junior Red Wings) 4–3
1995–96	66	27	36	3	–	–	57	0.432	262	288	6th Central	Did not qualify
1996–97	66	21	37	8	–	–	50	0.379	251	302	6th Central	Did not qualify
1997–98	66	25	34	7	–	–	57	0.432	257	268	5th Central	Won division quarterfinals (Barrie Colts) 4–2; Lost quarterfinals (Guelph Storm) 4–0
1998–99	68	25	35	8	–	–	58	0.426	261	288	2nd Central	Lost conference quarterfinals (Belleville Bulls) 4–0
1999–2000	68	39	23	5	1	–	84	0.610	262	221	2nd Central	Won conference quarterfinals (Kingston Frontenacs) 4–1; Lost conference semifinals (Barrie Colts) 4–3
2000–01	68	35	22	8	3	–	81	0.574	237	196	1st Central	Won conference quarterfinals (Barrie Colts) 4–1; Lost conference semifinals (Toronto St. Michael's Majors) 4–3
2001–02	68	25	33	5	5	–	60	0.404	171	216	3rd Central	Lost conference quarterfinals (Barrie Colts) 4–1
2002–03	68	16	46	4	2	–	38	0.265	175	273	5th Central	Did not qualify
2003–04	68	25	32	6	5	–	61	0.412	185	220	5th Central	Lost conference quarterfinals (Toronto St. Michael's Majors) 4–3
2004–05	68	32	23	6	7	–	77	0.515	201	185	4th Central	Won conference quarterfinals (Brampton Battalion) 4–2; Lost conference semifinals (Ottawa 67's) 4–2
2005–06	68	34	28	–	1	5	74	0.544	227	222	3rd Central	Won conference quarterfinals (Kingston Frontenacs) 4–2; Lost conference semifinals (Peterborough Petes) 4–0
2006–07	68	29	30	–	3	6	67	0.486	225	241	3rd Central	Won conference quarterfinals (Mississauga IceDogs) 4–1; Won conference semifinals (Barrie Colts) 4–0; Won conference finals (Belleville Bulls) 4–2; Lost OHL finals (Plymouth Whalers) 4–2
2007–08	68	17	46	–	2	3	39	0.287	175	292	5th Central	Did not qualify
2008–09	68	26	35	–	3	4	59	0.434	227	282	5th Central	Lost conference quarterfinals (Belleville Bulls) 4–2
2009–10	68	26	35	–	4	3	59	0.434	193	267	5th Central	Lost conference quarterfinals (Barrie Colts) 4–0
2010–11	68	29	35	–	2	2	62	0.456	235	276	4th Central	Won conference quarterfinals (Ottawa 67's) 4–0; Lost conference semifinals (Mississauga St. Michael's Majors) 4–0
2011–12	68	36	26	–	4	2	78	0.574	242	240	4th Central	Lost conference quarterfinals (Brampton Battalion) 4–0
2012–13	68	29	27	–	5	7	70	0.515	214	234	3rd Central	Won conference quarterfinals (Brampton Battalion) 4–1; Lost conference semifinals (Belleville Bulls) 4–0
2013–14	68	33	24	–	3	8	77	0.566	219	228	3rd Central	Lost conference quarterfinals (Barrie Colts) 4–1
2014–15	68	12	54	–	1	1	26	0.191	149	323	5th Central	Did not qualify
2015–16	68	16	46	–	5	1	38	0.279	183	328	5th Central	Did not qualify
2016–17	68	27	34	–	7	0	61	0.449	207	263	2nd Central	Lost conference quarterfinals (Oshawa Generals) 4–2
2017–18	68	17	42	–	9	0	43	0.316	197	291	5th Central	Did not qualify
2018–19	68	43	20	–	3	2	91	0.669	254	206	2nd Central	Won conference quarterfinals (Mississauga Steelheads) 4–0; Lost conference semifinals (Ottawa 67's) 4–0
2019–20	63	34	27	–	1	1	70	0.556	259	240	1st Central	Playoffs cancelled due to the COVID-19 pandemic
2020–21	Season cancelled due to the COVID-19 pandemic											
2021–22	68	23	38	–	3	4	53	0.390	223	297	4th Central	Did not qualify
2022–23	68	31	28	–	6	3	71	0.522	272	260	3rd Central	Lost conference quarterfinals (Peterborough Petes) 4–0
2023–24	68	38	23	–	4	3	83	0.610	328	272	3rd Central	Won conference quarterfinals (Mississauga Steelheads) 4–1; Lost conference semifinals (North Bay Battalion) 4–0
2024–25	68	32	31	–	5	0	69	0.507	245	269	3rd Central	Lost conference quarterfinals (Kingston Frontenacs) 4–0
2025–26	68	27	39	–	2	0	56	0.412	211	262	4th Central	Lost conference quarterfinals (Brantford Bulldogs) 4–0

== Uniforms and logos ==

From 1972 to 1988, the Sudbury Wolves' colours were green, white and gold. The tradition of Sudbury teams wearing green jerseys dates back to the mid-1910s. In 1988–89, Ken Burgess - who famously asked "Who ever heard of a green wolf?" - changed the team's colours to blue, white and grey, which happened to be the corporate colours of the business that bore his name. These have been the Wolves' colours ever since, though the team has occasionally donned throwback green jerseys. The iconic blood-toothed, wily wolf-head logo has subtly evolved since the current franchise's inception, but overall has remained relatively unchanged and today is one of the most recognizable logos in the CHL.

There have been various alterations and versions of the team's primary jersey design over the years, as well as the introduction of third alternate jerseys, such as black and grey ones that were introduced in the mid-1990s and again in the early-2010s. The team unveiled several special edition jerseys during the 2022-23 season, including a fiftieth anniversary jersey, as well as a limited edition Shoresy Sudbury Blueberry Bulldogs themed jersey.

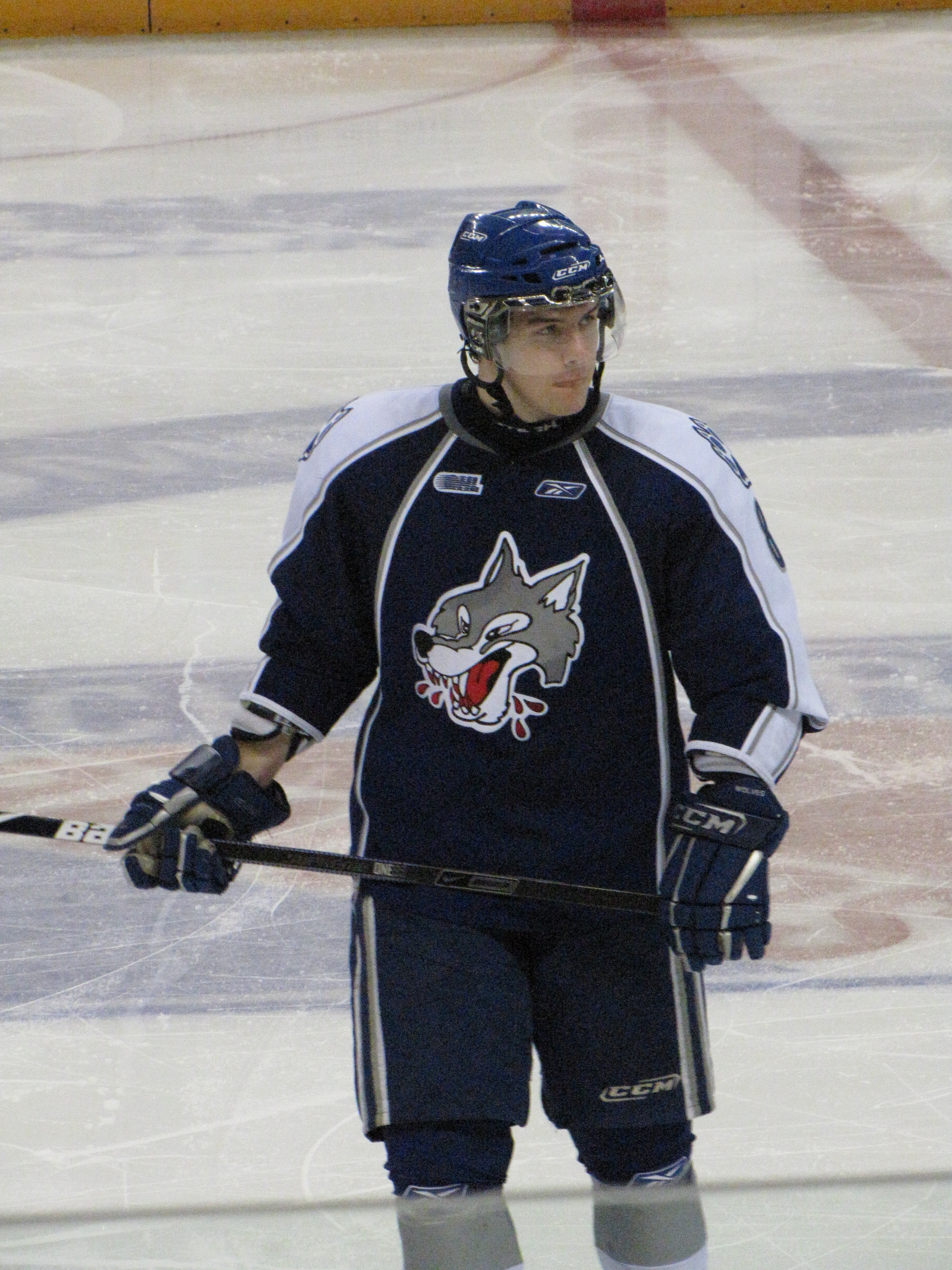
Jake Cardwell of the Wolves wearing the 2009 version of the away jersey

== Arena ==
The Sudbury Wolves play their home games at the downtown Sudbury Community Arena, which was constructed in 1951. The City of Greater Sudbury and the Wolves have upgraded the facility over the years, but since the mid-2010s there have been intensified debates about the building of a new arena.

Every time the Wolves score a goal, a taxidermic wolf rolls out on a pulley system from the rafters of the Sudbury Arena in the direction of the opposing team's bench. This tradition began in the 1950s when The Sudbury Star donated a stuffed wolf to the local Wolves team as a token of appreciation.

== Media ==
In the 2009-10 hockey season, Wolves games were broadcast on CJTK-FM in Sudbury. As of 2018, Wolves games are broadcast on CKLU-FM.

== See also ==
- List of ice hockey teams in Ontario
