= Jim Adair =

Canadian ice hockey player

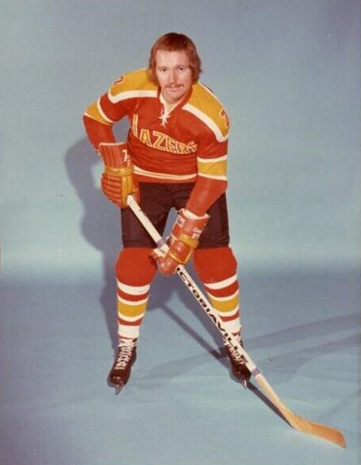
- Adair in 1973 photo
- Born: September 29, 1948 (age 77) Brockville, Ontario, Canada
- Height: 5 ft 11 in (180 cm)
- Weight: 180 lb (82 kg; 12 st 12 lb)
- Position: Centre
- Shot: Left
- Played for: Vancouver Blazers
- National team: Canada
- Playing career: 1968–1976

James Albert Adair (born September 29, 1948) is a Canadian retired professional ice hockey player who played in the World Hockey Association (WHA).

He appeared in 70 WHA games, recording 12 goal and 17 assists, along with 10 penalty minutes.

== Career statistics ==
=== Regular season and playoffs ===
			Regular season					Playoffs
Season	Team	League	GP	G	A	Pts	PIM	GP	G	A	Pts	PIM
1966–67	Hamilton Red Wings	OHA	48	22	23	45	15	—	—	—	—	—
1967–68	Hamilton Red Wings	OHA	54	18	26	44	19	—	—	—	—	—
1968–69	Canadian National Team	Intl	—	—	—	—	—	—	—	—	—	—
1969–70	Oklahoma City Blazers	CHL	64	20	25	45	30	—	—	—	—	—
1970–71	Oklahoma City Blazers	CHL	72	12	24	36	42	5	0	2	2	0
1971–72	Oklahoma City Blazers	CHL	4	0	5	5	0	—	—	—	—	—
1971–72	Fort Worth Wings	CHL	20	4	10	14	10	—	—	—	—	—
1973–74	Vancouver Blazers	WHA	70	12	17	29	10	—	—	—	—	—
1974–75	Tulsa Oilers	CHL	27	5	13	18	14	—	—	—	—	—
1974–75	Johnstown Jets	NAHL	14	7	4	11	9	—	—	—	—	—
1975–76	Johnstown Jets	NAHL	12	3	5	8	4	—	—	—	—	—
CHL totals			187	41	77	118	96	5	0	2	2	0
WHA totals			70	12	17	29	10	—	—	—	—	—
