= Greg Hickey =

Canadian ice hockey player

- Born: March 8, 1955 (age 70); Toronto, Ontario, Canada
- Height: 5 ft 11 in (180 cm)
- Weight: 180 lb (82 kg; 12 st 12 lb)
- Position: Left wing
- Shot: Left
- Played for: New York Rangers
- NHL draft: 48th overall, 1975; New York Rangers
- WHA draft: 10th overall, 1975; Minnesota Fighting Saints
- Playing career: 1975–1985

Gregory Hickey (born March 8, 1955) is a Canadian retired professional ice hockey player. Hickey played one game in the National Hockey League with the New York Rangers during the 1977–78 season, on April 8, 1978 against the New York Islanders. The rest of his career, which lasted from 1975 to 1985, was spent in the minor leagues. Hickey was born in Brantford, Ontario. His brother, Pat Hickey, also played hockey.

== Career statistics ==
=== Regular season and playoffs ===
			Regular season					Playoffs
Season	Team	League	GP	G	A	Pts	PIM	GP	G	A	Pts	PIM
1971–72	Hamilton Red Wings	OHA	—	—	—	—	—	—	—	—	—	—
1972–73	Hamilton Red Wings	OHA	53	13	9	22	65	—	—	—	—	—
1973–74	Hamilton Red Wings	OHA	67	30	28	58	63	—	—	—	—	—
1974–75	Hamilton Fincups	OMJHL	66	27	34	61	95	16	6	3	9	31
1975–76	Providence Reds	AHL	31	2	6	8	30	—	—	—	—	—
1975–76	Port Huron Flags	IHL	9	2	3	5	2	—	—	—	—	—
1976–77	New Haven Nighthawks	AHL	4	2	0	2	2	—	—	—	—	—
1976–77	Richmond Wildcats	SHL	28	8	16	24	65	—	—	—	—	—
1976–77	Charlotte Checkers	SHL	11	5	8	13	4	—	—	—	—	—
1977–78	New York Rangers	NHL	1	0	0	0	0	—	—	—	—	—
1977–78	New Haven Nighthawks	AHL	68	18	17	35	40	15	3	3	6	14
1978–79	New Haven Nighthawks	AHL	76	23	40	63	75	10	3	7	10	4
1979–80	Fort Wayne Komets	IHL	51	21	23	44	34	15	6	6	12	12
1980–81	Springfield Indians	AHL	74	15	15	30	65	7	2	1	3	21
1981–82	EV Zug	NLB	9	4	3	7	—	—	—	—	—	—
1982–83	Hampton Roads Gulls	ACHL	19	9	13	22	16	—	—	—	—	—
1982–83	Virginia Raiders	ACHL	17	3	5	8	6	4	0	0	0	0
1983–84	New Haven Nighthawks	AHL	2	0	0	0	0	—	—	—	—	—
AHL totals			255	60	78	138	212	32	8	11	19	39
NHL totals			1	0	0	0	0	—	—	—	—	—

== See also ==
- List of players who played only one game in the NHL
