= Hamilton Fincups =

Canadian junior ice hockey team (1974–1978)

- City: Hamilton, Ontario
- League: Ontario Major Junior Hockey League
- Operated: 1974–1978
- Colours: Blue, white and gold

Franchise history
- 1946–1953: Windsor Spitfires
- 1953–1960: Hamilton Tiger Cubs
- 1960–1974: Hamilton Red Wings
- 1974–1978: Hamilton/St. Catharines Fincups
- 1978–1984: Brantford Alexanders
- 1984–1988: Hamilton Steelhawks
- 1988–1996: Niagara Falls Thunder
- 1996–present: Erie Otters

Championships
- Playoff championships: 1976 Memorial Cup

The Hamilton Fincups were a Canadian junior ice hockey team in the Ontario Major Junior Hockey League for 4 years, from 1974 to 1978. The team played in Hamilton, Ontario for three years, and in St. Catharines, Ontario for one. The Hamilton Fincups played home games at the Barton Street Arena, also known as the Hamilton Forum from 1974–1976. The St. Catharines Fincups played in the Garden City Arena in downtown St. Catharines, Ontario in 1976–1977. After moving back to Hamilton, the Fincups played out of the Mountain Arena from 1977–1978.

== History ==
The Fincups were a short-lived team in the Ontario Major Junior Hockey League that was very successful on the ice, but did poorly generating revenue. The club bounced around in three outdated arenas in four years. Unable to turn much of a profit, the Fincups moved out of town, becoming the Brantford Alexanders.

Fincup was a combination of the surnames of the team's owners, Joe Finochio and the Cupido brothers Ron and Mario. They renamed the old Hamilton Red Wings after the 1974 season; the franchise had history in Steeltown dating back to the early 1950s. The new owners did not have to go far to hire a new coach for the new regime as they hired a very young Bert Templeton as the team's new coach (Bert was coaching the Junior B team in Hamilton owned by Cupido and Finochio) which had just won the Jr B championship (Sutherland cup). Templeton was voted winner of the Matt Leyden Trophy as Coach of the Year in his first season. Templeton was let go partway through the Fincups' fourth season due to conflict with ownership and replaced by Dave Draper.

In the four short seasons that the Fincups played, the team won the Memorial Cup once, and the J. Ross Robertson Cup once. The Fincups also represented Canada at the World Junior Tournament and came away with a silver medal.

The Fincups won the Emms Division regular season title for two consecutive years in 1975–76 and 1976–77, and the Hamilton Spectator Trophy in 1976–77 as the first overall team in the OHA regular season.

The Fincups made the OHA finals all 3 years they played out of Hamilton, and came within one win of making it four consecutive appearances in the championship series in their only year in St. Catharines.

The franchise issued a set of 18 sports cards for the 1974-75 season.

=== Memorial Cup 1976 ===
The Hamilton Fincups of 1976 won the Emms division regular season in 1976 and eliminated the Kitchener Rangers, Toronto Marlboros and the Sudbury Wolves to make to the Memorial Cup hosted at the Montreal Forum. Their opponents for the 1976 national title would be the WHL's New Westminster Bruins and the QMJHL's Quebec Remparts.

Hamilton lost the first game of the round-robin to Quebec 4-3, due to the 45 save performance of the Remparts goalie Maurice Barrette. The Bruins would defeat the Remparts the next day 4-2. The third game saw the Fincups score seven power play goals to beat the Bruins 8-4 in a game with many penalties, which concluded the round-robin.

The win and the large goal differential put Hamilton directly into the final game. New Westminster would solidly beat Quebec 10-3 in the semi-final game. The next day in front of 4,350 fans at the Montreal Forum, the Fincups played a tenacious forechecking game and defeated the New Westminster Bruins 5-2 in Memorial Cup Final game. The win brought the Memorial Cup back to the "Steel City" for the first time in 14 years.

=== Instability ===

The team's move to St. Catharines, Ontario in 1977 was necessitated by the closure of the old Barton Street Arena in Hamilton. During the 1976 Memorial Cup run, the Hamilton Spectator was filled with speculation about a possible move to Brantford, Ontario, as the old arena in Hamilton was obviously on its last legs. However, the city of Hamilton refused to make a decision about a new arena, and debated whether to build a 5,000-seat building for the Fincups or a 16,000 seat arena in hopes of pursuing a World Hockey Association team. In August 1976, the ice-making machinery in the dilapidated, 67-year-old barn broke down and Fincup ownership, who also owned the building, chose to demolish the battered, ancient arena rather than repair it. The team was unable to negotiate a short-term lease to use the only other semi-suitable arena in Hamilton, the Mountain Arena, due to opposition from local residents, and so the homeless team was forced to move to St. Catharines, Ontario, about thirty minutes down the QEW, who had recently witnessed the departure of their own OMJHL team, the Black Hawks.

Team ownership was able to negotiate a lease for Mountain Arena for the 1977-78 OHL season, but at the end of the year the city of Hamilton was still no closer to building a new arena than they had been two years earlier. Moreover, the team was losing money at the tiny, out of the way Mountain Arena. Out of long-term options in Hamilton, the team was moved at the end of that season to Brantford, where they were renamed the Brantford Alexanders.

== Players ==
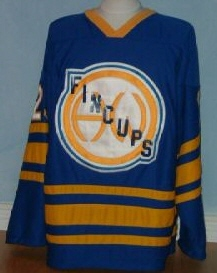
Hamilton Fincups blue jersey, 1976

=== Award winners ===
Season	Player	Award(s)	Recognition	Source
1974–75	Danny Shearer	Emms Family Award	Rookie of the year	
1975–76	Mark Locken	F. W. "Dinty" Moore Trophy	Best rookie GAA	
1975–76	Dale McCourt	William Hanley Trophy	Most sportsmanlike player	
1976–77	Dale McCourt	William Hanley Trophy	Most sportsmanlike player	
1976–77	Dale McCourt	Red Tilson Trophy	Most valuable player	
1976–77	Dale McCourt	David Branch Player of the Year Award	CHL player of the year	
1977–78	Rick Wamsley	Dave Pinkney Trophy	Lowest team GAA	

=== Notable alumni ===
Twenty-five alumni of the Fincups played in the National Hockey League or the World Hockey Association: (Note: Major league alumni of the Fincups: Hamilton 1974–1976.; St. Catharines 1976–1977.; Hamilton 1977–1978.)

- Joe Contini
- Tim Coulis
- Mike Fedorko
- Mike Forbes
- Jody Gage
- Gaston Gingras
- Steve Hazlett
- Greg Hickey
- Willie Huber
- Al Jensen
- Jay Johnston
- Mike Keating
- Joe Kowal
- Randy Ladouceur
- Ted Long
- Paul Marshall
- Dale McCourt
- Mark Plantery
- Greg Redquest
- Glen Richardson
- Al Secord
- Ric Seiling
- Doug Shedden
- Greg Terrion
- Rick Wamsley

== Season-by-season results ==
Regular season and playoffs results: (Note: Regular season and playoffs results of the Fincups: Hamilton 1974–1976.; St. Catharines 1976–1977.; Hamilton 1977–1978.)

Legend: GP = Games played, W = Wins, L = Losses, T = Ties, Pts = Points, GF = Goals for, GA = Goals against

Memorial Cup champions	OHL champions	OHL finalists

Season	Regular season									Playoffs
Season	GP	W	L	T	Pts	Pct	GF	GA	Finish	Playoffs
1974–75	70	37	24	9	83	0.593	337	271	3rd OMJHL	Won quarterfinal (St. Catharines Black Hawks) 8–0; Won semifinal (Peterborough Petes) 8–4; Lost OMJHL final (Toronto Marlboros) 8–6
1975–76	66	43	15	8	94	0.712	379	232	1st Emms	Won quarterfinal (Kitchener Rangers) 8–0; Won semifinal (Toronto Marlboros) 9–1; Won OMJHL final (Sudbury Wolves) 8–2; Won 1976 Memorial Cup final (New Westminster Bruins 5–2
1976–77	66	50	11	5	105	0.795	438	242	1st Emms	Won quarterfinal (Windsor Spitfires) 4–2; Lost semifinal (London Knights) 4–3–1
1977–78	68	31	23	14	76	0.559	273	223	3rd Emms	Won quarterfinal (Windsor Spitfires) 9–3; Won semifinal (London Knights) 9–5; Lost OMJHL final (Peterborough Petes) 8–6
