= Mike Hoffman (ice hockey, born 1963) =

Canadian ice hockey player

- Born: February 26, 1963 (age 62) Barrie, Ontario, Canada
- Height: 5 ft 11 in (180 cm)
- Weight: 190 lb (86 kg; 13 st 8 lb)
- Position: Left wing
- Shot: Left
- Played for: Hartford Whalers
- NHL draft: 67th overall, 1981; Hartford Whalers
- Playing career: 1983–1990

Michael Hoffman (born February 26, 1963) is a Canadian former professional ice hockey player. He has 3 Children; Jessica Hoffman, Nicolas Hoffman, Robert Hoffman.

== Early life ==
He was born in Barrie, Ontario. As a youth, he played in the 1976 Quebec International Pee-Wee Hockey Tournament with a minor ice hockey team from Barrie.

== Career ==
Hoffman played nine games in the National Hockey League with the Hartford Whalers between 1983 and 1986. The rest of his career, which lasted from 1983 to 1990, was mainly spent in the minor American Hockey League.

== Career statistics ==
=== Regular season and playoffs ===
			Regular season					Playoffs
Season	Team	League	GP	G	A	Pts	PIM	GP	G	A	Pts	PIM
1979–80	Barrie Colts	COJHL	60	45	30	75	—	—	—	—	—	—
1980–81	Brantford Alexanders	OHL	68	15	19	34	71	6	1	0	1	5
1981–82	Brantford Alexanders	OHL	66	34	47	81	169	11	5	3	8	9
1982–83	Brantford Alexanders	OHL	63	26	49	75	128	8	5	4	9	18
1982–83	Hartford Whalers	NHL	2	0	1	1	0	—	—	—	—	—
1982–83	Binghamton Whalers	AHL	1	0	0	0	0	3	0	1	1	0
1983–84	Binghamton Whalers	AHL	64	11	13	24	92	—	—	—	—	—
1984–85	Hartford Whalers	NHL	1	0	0	0	0	—	—	—	—	—
1984–85	Binghamton Whalers	AHL	76	19	26	45	95	8	4	1	5	23
1985–86	Hartford Whalers	NHL	6	1	2	3	2	—	—	—	—	—
1985–86	Binghamton Whalers	AHL	40	14	14	28	79	2	1	0	1	2
1986–87	Binghamton Whalers	AHL	74	9	32	41	120	13	2	2	4	23
1987–88	Flint Spirits	IHL	64	35	28	63	49	14	3	7	10	36
1988–89	Flint Spirits	IHL	76	33	39	72	46	—	—	—	—	—
1989–90	EV Landsberg	GER-2	13	6	12	18	14	—	—	—	—	—
AHL totals			255	53	85	138	386	26	7	4	11	48
NHL totals			9	1	3	4	2	—	—	—	—	—
