= Hamilton Red Wings =

Canadian junior ice hockey team (1960–1974)

- City: Hamilton, Ontario
- League: Ontario Hockey Association
- Operated: 1960–1974
- Home arena: Barton Street Arena
- Parent clubs: Detroit Red Wings (1960–1967)

Franchise history
- 1946–1953: Windsor Spitfires
- 1953–1960: Hamilton Tiger Cubs
- 1960–1974: Hamilton Red Wings
- 1974–1978: Hamilton/St. Catharines Fincups
- 1978–1984: Brantford Alexanders
- 1984–1988: Hamilton Steelhawks
- 1988–1996: Niagara Falls Thunder
- 1996–present: Erie Otters

Championships
- Playoff championships: 1962 Memorial Cup Champions

The Hamilton Red Wings were a junior ice hockey team in the Ontario Hockey Association (OHA) from 1960 to 1974. The team was based at the Barton Street Arena in Hamilton, Ontario. The Red Wings won the OHA junior championship in 1962, and won the 1962 Memorial Cup as national champions.

== History ==
The Hamilton Tiger Cubs became the Hamilton Red Wings as of the 1960–61 OHA season, were coached by Eddie Bush, and affiliated with the Detroit Red Wings of the National Hockey League (NHL). Jimmy Skinner was the team's scout and general manager, which was based at the Barton Street Arena.

In the 1961–62 OHA season, the Red Wings placed second overall. In the playoffs, Hamilton defeated the St. Catharines Teepees in six games, the Niagara Falls Flyers in four games, and the Metro Jr. A. champs Toronto St. Michael's Majors in five games to win the J. Ross Robertson Cup. The Red Wings then swept the series against the Quebec Citadelles for the George Richardson Memorial Trophy as the Eastern Canadian champions.

The Red Wings played the Edmonton Oil Kings for the 1962 Memorial Cup championship. Originally scheduled at Maple Leaf Gardens, the Canadian Amateur Hockey Association relocated the games due to disagreements on television broadcast rights. Playing the first game at Barton Street Arena, Hamilton won by a 5–2 score. Playing the next three games at Guelph Memorial Gardens, Hamilton won twice to lead the series three games to one. Playing the fifth game at Kitchener Memorial Auditorium, the Red Wings defeated the Oil Kings by a 7–4 score to win the national championship series.

Five years later the Red Wings lost the OHA finals in 1967, in four consecutive games to the Toronto Marlboros.

The direct NHL sponsorship of junior teams ended in 1967. The Red Wings were purchased by Nick Durbano in 1970. Durbano sold the team in 1974, which became the Hamilton Fincups in the next season.

== Award winners ==
Season	Player	Award(s)	Recognition	Source
1960–61	Bud Blom	Dave Pinkney Trophy	Lowest team goals against average	
1961–62	Pit Martin	Red Tilson Trophy	Most outstanding player	
1961–62	Lowell MacDonald	Max Kaminsky Trophy	Most sportsmanlike player	
1962–63	Paul Henderson	Max Kaminsky Trophy	Most sportsmanlike player	
1964–65	Jimmy Peters Jr.	Max Kaminsky Trophy	Most sportsmanlike player	
1967–68	Jim Rutherford / Gerry Gray	Dave Pinkney Trophy	Lowest team goals against average	

== Notable players ==
Notable Red Wings alumni who also played in the National Hockey League or World Hockey Association:

- Gerry Abel
- Jim Adair
- Ron Anderson
- Cam Botting
- Gord Brooks
- Jerry Butler
- Bryan Campbell
- Ron Climie
- Gary Coalter
- Bart Crashley
- Bob Dillabough
- Gary Doak
- Mike Fedorko
- Marty Gateman
- Gary Geldart
- Brian Gibbons
- Ed Gilbert
- Dave Gilmour
- Larry Gould
- Gerry Gray
- Ron Harris
- Buster Harvey
- Ed Hatoum
- Earl Heiskala
- Paul Henderson
- Greg Hickey
- Pat Hickey
- Mike Hobin
- Paul Hoganson
- Bill Hughes
- Larry Jeffrey
- Rick Jodzio
- Rick Kehoe
- Roger Lafreniere
- Danny Lawson
- Rene Leclerc
- Réal Lemieux
- Nick Libett
- Ted Long
- Lowell MacDonald
- Alan MacKenzie
- Pete Mahovlich
- Jim Mair
- Randy Manery
- Ken Mann
- Bob Manno
- Gary Marsh
- Pit Martin
- Dale McCourt
- Howie Menard
- John Miszuk
- Rick Morris
- Jim Moxey
- Bob Neely
- Jim Niekamp
- Randy Osburn
- Jimmy Peters Jr.
- Greg Redquest
- Glen Richardson
- Wayne Rivers
- Jim Rutherford
- Terry Ryan
- Jim Schoenfeld
- Ron Sedlbauer
- Rick Smith
- Sandy Snow
- Fred Speck
- Dave Syvret
- Tom Trevelyan
- Mike Veisor
- Bob Wall
- Jim Watson
- Brian Watts
- Tom Williams
- Ron Wilson

Kevin Pettit played for the Red Wings from 1964 to 1967, and was later an All-American for Cornell Big Red. Lee Carpenter played for the Red Wings from 1965 to 1966, and was chosen by the Detroit Red Wings in the third round of 1966 NHL amateur draft, but never played in the NHL. Jim McInally played for the Red Wings from 1966 to 1968, and was chosen by the Los Angeles Kings in the first round of 1968 NHL amateur draft, but never played in the NHL. Jim Koleff played for the Red Wings from 1971 to 1973, and later coached in European professional leagues.

== Season-by-season results ==
Regular season and playoffs results:

Legend: GP = Games played, W = Wins, L = Losses, T = Ties, Pts = Points, GF = Goals for, GA = Goals against

Memorial Cup champions	OHA champions	OHA finalists

Season	Regular season									Playoffs
Season	GP	W	L	T	Pts	Pct	GF	GA	Finish	Playoffs
1960–61	48	22	19	7	51	0.531	192	148	3rd OHA	Won quarterfinal (Peterborough Petes) 4–1; Lost semifinal (Toronto St. Michael's Majors) 4–2–1
1961–62	50	32	12	6	70	0.700	220	162	2nd OHA	Won semifinal (St. Catharines Teepees) 4–1–1; Won OHA final (Niagara Falls Flyers) 4–0; Won Ontario Junior A final (Toronto St. Michael's Majors) 4–1; Won Eastern Canada final (Quebec Citadelles) 4–0; Won 1962 Memorial Cup final (Edmonton Oil Kings) 4–1
1962–63	50	21	21	8	50	0.500	202	184	4th OHA	Lost semifinal (Niagara Falls Flyers) 4–1
1963–64	56	11	35	10	32	0.286	193	285	7th OHA	Did not qualify
1964–65	56	14	31	11	39	0.348	220	287	8th OHA	Did not qualify
1965–66	48	22	20	6	50	0.521	203	217	5th OHA	Lost quarterfinal (Montreal Junior Canadiens) 3–0–2
1966–67	48	22	21	5	49	0.510	172	161	4th OHA	Won quarterfinal (Peterborough Petes) 8–4; Won semifinal (Niagara Falls Flyers) 3–2–2; Lost OHA final (Toronto Marlboros) 4–0
1967–68	54	31	13	10	72	0.667	253	162	3rd OHA	Won quarterfinal (London Nationals) 4–1; Lost semifinal (Kitchener Rangers) 3–1–2
1968–69	54	27	24	3	57	0.528	207	190	5th OHA	Lost quarterfinal (Montreal Junior Canadiens) 3–0–2
1969–70	54	16	26	12	44	0.407	207	238	9th OHA	Did not qualify
1970–71	62	22	35	5	49	0.395	224	328	7th OHA	Lost quarterfinal (Ottawa 67's) 4–2
1971–72	63	11	46	6	28	0.222	200	334	10th OHA	Did not qualify
1972–73	63	15	41	7	37	0.294	244	374	9th OHA	Did not qualify
1973–74	70	16	49	5	37	0.264	221	376	11th OHA	Did not qualify
