= History of the Ontario Hockey League =

In 1970, the Junior A level was divided into two more levels, Tier I (Major Junior A) and Tier II (Minor Junior A). In 1974, the "Major Junior A" division of the OHA became the Ontario Major Junior Hockey League (OMJHL) and began to operate independently of the OHA. Finally in 1980, the OMJHL became the Ontario Hockey League.

== Ontario Hockey Association history ==
Hockey started as a challenge series in the winter of 1889 when a team from Ottawa challenged teams from Lindsay and Toronto. A year later the Ontario Hockey Association was formed on November 27, 1890 in Toronto at the Queen's Hotel.

=== Junior hockey (1892–1933) ===
The first junior teams started play in 1892, without enforced age limits; the first champions Kingston Limestones over Galt. In 1896, the OHA re-organized into three divisions, senior, intermediate and junior. Junior hockey now became age-limited to players 20 years of age or younger by January 1 of the season being played. Out of its modest beginnings at the turn of the century, junior hockey quickly grew into an organized and entertaining brand of hockey. The end of World War I marked the beginning of the Memorial Cup, the symbol of junior hockey supremacy in Canada. Teams from all across the province participated in provincial playoffs in the hope of winning the George Richardson Memorial Trophy and representing Eastern Canada in the Memorial Cup finals. As each year passed, the number of communities participating in junior hockey grew and the calibre of play increased.

=== OHA Junior 'A' (1933–1972) ===
For the 1933–34 season, junior hockey was split into 'A' and 'B' divisions. Two new championship trophies were created at the same time. The 'A' level teams competing for the J. Ross Robertson Cup as OHA champions and the Memorial Cup as national champions. The 'B' level teams competed for the Sutherland Cup, which is still Ontario's Junior B championship trophy.

The 1930s gave birth to noted teams such as the Oshawa Generals, St. Michael's Majors and the Toronto Marlboros. Other notable teams of that era were the Toronto Young Rangers, Toronto Native Sons, and the Stratford Midgets.

The 1940s welcomed new communities to the limelight such as the Barrie Flyers, Guelph Biltmores, Stratford Kroehlers and the St. Catharines Teepees. The first version of the Windsor Spitfires also appeared in the 1940s only to fade away in the early 1950s.

The OHA awarded its first individual player trophies in 1945. The Red Tilson Trophy was awarded to the player voted "Most Outstanding" in the league. The Eddie Powers Memorial Trophy was awarded to the league's top scorer.

The 1950s saw other cities join in. The Kitchener Greenshirts entered the league only to move on to become the Peterborough Petes. Hamilton also joined as the Tiger Cubs (later the Red Wings). The 1950s also saw inter-league play with Quebec-based teams.

==== A divided league (1961–63) ====
Stafford Smythe, owner of the Toronto Maple Leafs, started the Metro Junior A League in an attempt to rival the OHA. The Toronto Marlboros, who were owned by the Leafs, were withdrawn from the OHA and placed in a league with promoted Junior B teams including the Whitby Mohawks, the Brampton 7 Ups, and the Unionville Seaforths. The other member of the league was the former St. Michael's Majors franchise, who would be later transferred to Neil McNeil High School in Scarborough, Ontario. Father David Bauer, the legendary coach and St. Michael's teacher, had decided to withdraw the private school from participation following their Memorial Cup win in 1961.

In response, the OHA managed to convince Sam Pollock's Montreal Junior Canadiens to join. The league that year consisted of the Guelph Royals, Hamilton Red Wings, St. Catharines Black Hawks, Peterborough T.P.T., Montreal Junior Canadiens and the Niagara Falls Flyers.

The rival league was a failure on and off the ice, and it effectively became a second division. Although it was independent from the OHA, the champions of the OHA and the Metro Junior A would play each other in the playoffs each year on the road to the Memorial Cup.

For its second season, the Metro League underwent sweeping changes, with the Whitby Mohawks renamed the Whitby Dunlops, the Unionville Seaforths becoming Toronto Knob Hill Farms, and the Majors became the Toronto Neil McNeil Maroons. The new sixth team in the league would be the reborn Oshawa Generals.

==== Re-unified league (1963–67) ====
However, after two seasons of the Metro Junior A League, it failed, and a new unified Junior A league emerged. Unfortunately, this meant the end of Neil McNeil, Brampton, Knob Hill and Unionville. The Marlboros and the reborn Oshawa Generals re-joined the OHA in 1964. The Guelph Royals also became the Kitchener Rangers.

==== Beginning of NHL Amateur Draft ====
The first NHL Amateur Draft was held in 1963 for any junior player who was not already sponsored by an NHL team. When the NHL expanded in 1969, the rules of the draft were changed to allow any amateur player under the age of 20 to be chosen. The OHA ceased being a direct farm system and began to compete with other junior leagues to graduate players. Réjean Houle became the first OHA player to be drafted first overall in 1969 by the Montreal Canadiens. The Canadiens took advantage of a grandfather clause that gave them first right to francophone players. In 1970 that clause was revoked, and Gilbert Perreault was drafted first overall by the Buffalo Sabres. Both Réjean Houle and Gilbert Perreault played in the OHA with the Montreal Junior Canadiens.

==== End of NHL sponsorship ====
In 1965 the London Nationals (later Knights) were added to the OHA as the last NHL-sponsored team. By 1967, direct NHL sponsorship of teams and individual players had ended. Prior to this time, all of the Original Six NHL teams had involvement in OHA teams:

NHL team	OHA Farm Team
Boston Bruins	Barrie Flyers (1945–1960); Niagara Falls Flyers (1960–1967); Oshawa Generals (1962–1967)
Chicago Black Hawks	Galt Black Hawks (1949–1955); St. Catharines Black Hawks (1962–1967)
Detroit Red Wings	Galt Red Wings (1944–1947); Windsor Spitfires (1946–1953); Oshawa Generals (1950–1953); Hamilton Red Wings (1960–1967)
New York Rangers	Guelph Biltmores (1947–1960); Guelph Royals (1960–1963); Kitchener Rangers (1963–1967)
Montreal Canadiens	Kitchener Canucks (1951–1956); Peterborough Petes (1956–1967); Montreal Junior Canadiens (1961–1967)
Toronto Maple Leafs	Toronto Marlboros (1927–1967); Toronto St. Michael's Majors (19??-1961); London Nationals (1965–1967)

In 1967 the Ottawa 67's were added to the league, named after Canada's centennial anniversary. The OHA existed with ten teams until 1972, upon the creation of a new level of junior hockey, and the folding of the Northern Ontario Junior Hockey League.

==== Feud between the OHA and the QMJHL ====
The competitiveness between the Ontario Hockey Association and the Quebec Major Junior Hockey League had grown since 1969 when the QMJHL was born. It was further escalated by the incidents of the 1971 Richardson Cup, and the lawsuit over the Montreal Junior Canadiens.

===== 1971 Richardson Cup =====
The Eastern Canadian championship of 1971 was a controversial series, and would be the last time teams played for the Richardson Cup. It would be replaced the following season in 1972, with the Memorial Cup tournament, as part of reshaping junior hockey. The 1971 series featured future NHL stars Guy Lafleur and Marcel Dionne, but never lived up to the potential on ice brilliance that could have been. Disputes off the ice and erupting violence abrupted the series before it was finished.

The St. Catharines Black Hawks and Quebec Remparts series was intense on many levels. Besides the strong rivalry between Anglophone and Francophone hockey teams, there was personal rift between Marcel Dionne and the Remparts coach Maurice Filion over Dionne playing in the OHA, which was seen as a higher-calibre level of competition. This rivalry was further fueled by the desire of Francophone nationalists to have a Canadian champion from a Quebec team in a Quebec-based league.

The Remparts won the first game 4–2 played in St. Catharines and televised by closed circuit to over 8,000 spectators in Quebec arenas. Despite the win, Filion complained about the OHA referee's bias against his players, calling it anti-Francophone. The Black Hawks won game two by a score of 8–3, to tie the series at 1 game each.

Game three was played in the Colisée de Québec to an overflow crowd, seeing the Remparts win 3–1. There were a total of 102 penalty minutes called, 77 of those were against the Black Hawks. Brian MacKenize of St. Catharines would be suspended for one game after confronting a linesman. After this game, the OHA lodged a complaint to the CAHA about QMHL appointed referees.

The next game of the series was uglier than the last game. Another overflow crowd saw the Remparts win game 4 by a score of 6–1. As the game wore on, more and more fights broke out on the ice, involving players leaving the penalty box to join the fray. The St. Catharines players were escorted off the ice by police amidst the hurling of debris from Quebec fans. After the game an angry mob surrounded the St. Catharines team bus on its way to the motel, and was given a police escort to safety. The mob circled the motel until the early hours of the morning.

After disputes between the teams and leagues, game five was played on neutral ice at Maple Leaf Gardens in Toronto, which the Black Hawks won 6–3 to narrow the series 3 games to 2 for Quebec. That was the last game played.

The parents of the St. Catharines players refused to send their children back to Quebec City for fear of the violence that occurred after game four. The Remparts refused to play anywhere else but their home rink, including any neutral ice in the province of Quebec. The problem was further confounded with threats surfacing from the FLQ (Front de libération du Québec) against St. Catharines players.

CAHA president Dawson declared the series to be over when no further compromise could be reached, and he had received official notice from St. Catharines that the team would not return to the Colisée. As a result, the Remparts went on to compete for the Memorial Cup by default, which they won, defeating the Edmonton Oil Kings.

===== Departure of the Montreal Junior Canadiens =====
The QMJHL threatened a lawsuit against the OHA to force the Junior Canadiens to return to the Quebec-based league, from which it departed in 1961 in favour of competing in the higher calibre OHA. The QMJHL not only wanted a team in the province's biggest city, but also felt the Junior Canadiens had violated the territorial right of the QMJHL. Ironically, the QMJHL had previously granted franchise rights to the Cornwall Royals of the Central Junior A Hockey League in 1969, when the OHA had denied the Royals bid.

To solve the problem, the OHA granted the Junior Canadiens franchise a "one-year suspension" of operations, while team ownership transferred the team and players into the QMJHL, renaming themselves the Montreal Bleu Blanc Rouge in the process.

The OHA then "re-established" the suspended franchise after a one-year hiatus, under new ownership and with new players, calling the team the Kingston Canadians. The new Kingston team was essentially an expansion franchise, that had only common name to share with the departed team, but has some claim to the legacy of the Junior Canadiens.

=== OHA Major Junior 'A' (1970–1974) ===
For the 1970–71 season, Junior A hockey split again into Tier I and Tier II. The only Tier I league in the province became known as the OHA Major Jr. A. Its winner represented Ontario in a round-robin Memorial Cup with a team from the Western Hockey League and another team from the Quebec Major Junior Hockey League. The Tier II teams would compete for the newly created Manitoba Centennial Trophy.

Communities such as Sudbury (transfer from Niagara Falls) and Sault Ste. Marie that had been part of the Northern Ontario Junior Hockey League (NOJHL) prior to the Tier I/Tier II split, joined the Major Jr. A ranks in 1972 to rejoin the Memorial Cup hunt. The 1970s also saw the Montreal Junior Canadiens moving back into the QJHL's successor, the Quebec Major Junior Hockey League. The Kingston Canadians joined the OHL in their place as the Junior Canadiens' successors, albeit with different ownership and players. The league also witnessed the rebirth of the Windsor Spitfires during this time period.

=== OHA timeline of teams ===
- 1937 - The OHA (Ontario Hockey Association) consists of seven teams. Six are based in Toronto and one from Oshawa. The teams are, the Oshawa Generals, Toronto Lions, Toronto Marlboros, Toronto Native Sons, Toronto St. Michael's College Majors, Toronto Young Rangers, and the University of Toronto Varsity Blues.
- 1938 - The Guelph Indians join the league.
- 1939 - The Toronto St. Michael's Majors drop out of the league. The Toronto Lions drop out of the league. The Guelph Indians become Guelph Biltmores. The University of Toronto Varsity Blues drop out of the league mid-year.
- 1940 - The Toronto Young Rangers are renamed Toronto Bowles Rangers.
- 1941 - The Toronto Bowles Rangers revert to being the Toronto Young Rangers. The Toronto St. Michael's Majors re-join the league. The Brantford Lions join the league. The Toronto Native Sons drop out halfway through the season, and declare all their games forfeit.
- 1942 - The Hamilton Whizzers join the league. The Stratford Kroehlers join the league. The Guelph Biltmores drop out of the league. The Toronto Young Rangers drop out of the league.
- 1943 - The Galt Canadians join the league. The St. Catharines Falcons join the league. The Port Colborne Recreationists join the league. Toronto Young Rangers re-join the league.
- 1944 - The Galt Canadians become Galt Red Wings. The Brantford Lions drop out of league. The Port Colborne Recreationists drop out of league. The Stratford Kroehlers drop out of league. The Hamilton Whizzers became the Hamilton Barons, then drop out of the league.
- 1945 - The Barrie Flyers join the league. The Hamilton Lloyds join the league.
- 1946 - The Hamilton Lloyds become the Hamilton Szabos. The Windsor Spitfires join the league. The Stratford Kroehlers re-join the league.
- 1947 - Hamilton drops out of the league. Guelph Biltmores rejoin the league. The Galt Red Wings become the Galt Rockets. The St. Catharines Falcons become the St. Catharines Teepees.
- 1948 - Toronto Young Rangers drop out of the league.
- 1949 - The Galt Rockets become the Galt Black Hawks.
- 1950 - The Waterloo Hurricanes join the league.
- 1951 - The Kitchener Greenshirts join the league. The Stratford Kroehlers drop out of the league.
- 1952 - The Waterloo Hurricanes disband.
- 1953 - The Windsor Spitfires drop out of the league. The Oshawa Generals drop out of the league, after a fire destroys the Hambly Arena. The Hamilton Tiger Cubs join the league.
- 1954 - The Kitchener Greenshirts become the Kitchener Canucks.
- 1955 - The Galt Black Hawks drop out of the league.
- 1956 - The Kitchener Canucks become the Peterborough Petes.
- 1960 - The Guelph Biltmore Mad Hatters become the Guelph Royals. The Barrie Flyers become the Niagara Falls Flyers. The Hamilton Tiger Cubs become the Hamilton Red Wings.
- 1961 - The Montreal Junior Canadiens join the OHA from the Quebec Junior Hockey League. The Metro Junior A League becomes another division of the OHA. Its teams will be the St. Michael's Majors, Toronto Marlboros, Brampton 7ups, Unionville Seaforths and Whitby Mohawks.
- 1962 - The Oshawa Generals join the Metro League. The St. Michael's Majors become the Toronto Neil McNeil Maroons and the Unionville Seaforths become Toronto Knob Hill Farms. The Whitby Mohawks are renamed the Whitby Dunlops. The St. Catharines Teepees become the St. Catharines Black Hawks.
- 1963 - The Metro Junior League disbands. The Toronto Marlboros rejoin the OHA, as do the Oshawa Generals although they play their first season in Bowmanville. The other teams in the Metro Junior League cease operations. The Guelph Royals become the Kitchener Rangers.
- 1965 - The London Nationals are granted a franchise.
- 1967 - The Ottawa 67's are granted a franchise.
- 1968 - The London Nationals become the London Knights.
- 1972 - The Montreal Junior Canadiens move to the QMJHL. Sault Ste. Marie Greyhounds are granted a franchise. The Niagara Falls Flyers become the Sudbury Wolves.
- 1973 - The Kingston Canadians are granted a franchise.

== Ontario Major Junior Hockey League history ==
In 1974, the "Major Jr. A" (Tier I) division of the OHA became the Ontario Major Junior Hockey League and began to operate independently of the OHA. The new league opened up administration offices and appointed its own commissioner.

The OMJHL instituted many rules changes to distinguish itself from Tier II (Minor Jr. A), including allowing one overage player on the roster. The Central Scouting Bureau was started in 1975 to provide teams with more information about players available in the upcoming draft. The same year the league divided into a two division format. Then in 1977, the OMHJL held its first All-Star game in Sudbury, Ontario.

=== OMJHL timeline of teams ===
- 1974 - The Ontario Hockey Association's Junior A Tier I league becomes the Ontario Major Junior Hockey League. The Hamilton Red Wings become the Hamilton Fincups.
- 1975 - The Windsor Spitfires are granted a franchise.
- 1976 - The St. Catharines Black Hawks become the Niagara Falls Flyers. The Hamilton Fincups become the St. Catharines Fincups after they are left homeless by the breakdown of ice-making equipment and subsequent demolition of their ancient arena weeks before the beginning of the season.
- 1977 - The St. Catharines Fincups revert to being the Hamilton Fincups.
- 1978 - The Hamilton Fincups become the Brantford Alexanders.

== Ontario Hockey League history ==
In 1980, the Ontario Major Junior Hockey League sought to gain further independence and more control over its financial policies and gate receipts. The OMJHL separated itself from the Ontario Hockey Association, becoming the Ontario Hockey League.

An agreement was struck between the two sides where the OHL would pay the OHA $30,000 annually in affiliation fees and the right to compete for the Memorial Cup, and the OHL teams would have complete control over finances and ticket sales. The OHA would continue to operate hockey from Junior A Tier II, and below. David Branch became Commissioner of the OHL at this time, a position he held until 2024. Since 1980, the league has grown rapidly into a high-profile marketable product, with many games broadcast on television and radio.

In the 1980s, the league added the Guelph Platers and Belleville Bulls, and welcomed the Cornwall Royals from the QMJHL. North Bay took in the second version of the Niagara Falls Flyers. The former Fincups franchise was recycled through Brantford as the Brantford Alexanders and back to Hamilton, and by the end of the decade it was in Niagara Falls. The end of the decade saw the end of another storied team, the Toronto Marlboros, as they relocated to become the Hamilton Dukes. It also saw the end of the Kingston Canadians name as they were renamed the Raiders, and renamed again to the Frontenacs the following year. During the 1980s, the OHL experimented with Cooperalls as standardized league equipment, but reverted to hockey shorts.

The OHL split from the OHA in July 1982. The OHA and OHL disagreed on financial terms of affiliation, then the OHL decided to handle its own administration. The OHA and the OHL later reached an interim affiliation agreement, which allowed the OHL to compete at the Memorial Cup.

The 1990s saw the league expand into the USA. The first franchise the expansion Detroit Compuware Ambassadors (later the Detroit Junior Red Wings, Detroit Whalers and Plymouth Whalers) and the secondly the Erie Otters, who relocated from Niagara Falls. The Otters could trace their heritage back to the Hamilton Tiger Cubs of 1953. Newmarket also briefly had the Royals before moving on to become the Sarnia Sting. The Dukes became the Guelph Storm; filling the void left when the Platers relocated to Owen Sound. Barrie rejoined the league in 1995 with the Colts and the Toronto St. Michael's Majors also rejoined the league in 1997 after a 34-year absence. The league continued to expand with two new teams in 1998; Don Cherry's Mississauga IceDogs and the Brampton Battalion. In 2000 The Owen Sound Platers were renamed to the Attack after being bought by local interests. In 2002, the Centennials moved to Saginaw, Michigan to become the Saginaw Spirit.

There are currently 20 teams in the OHL; 17 are based in Ontario, 2 teams from Michigan and 1 team from Pennsylvania.

=== OHL timeline of teams ===
- 1980 - The Ontario Major Junior Hockey League renames itself the Ontario Hockey League, further separating from the Ontario Hockey Association.
- 1981 - The Cornwall Royals transfer to the OHL from the QMJHL. The Belleville Bulls are granted a franchise.
- 1982 - The Guelph Platers are awarded a franchise. The Niagara Falls Flyers become the North Bay Centennials.
- 1984 - The Brantford Alexanders become the Hamilton Steelhawks. The Windsor Spitfires become the Windsor Compuware Spitfires.
- 1988 - The Hamilton Steelhawks become the Niagara Falls Thunder. The Kingston Canadians become the Kingston Raiders.
- 1989 - The Toronto Marlboros become the Dukes of Hamilton. The Guelph Platers become the Owen Sound Platers. The Kingston Raiders become the Kingston Frontenacs. The Windsor Compuware Spitfires revert to being the Windsor Spitfires.
- 1990 - The Detroit Compuware Ambassadors are awarded a franchise.
- 1991 - The Dukes of Hamilton become the Guelph Storm.
- 1992 - The Cornwall Royals become the Newmarket Royals. The Detroit Compuware Ambassadors become the Detroit Junior Red Wings.
- 1994 - The Newmarket Royals become the Sarnia Sting.
- 1995 - The Barrie Colts are awarded a franchise. The Detroit Junior Red Wings become the Detroit Whalers.
- 1996 - The Niagara Falls Thunder become the Erie Otters.
- 1997 - The Toronto St. Michael's Majors team is re-activated when they are awarded a franchise. The Detroit Whalers become the Plymouth Whalers.
- 1998 - The Brampton Battalion and Mississauga IceDogs are awarded franchises.
- 2000 - The Owen Sound Platers become the Owen Sound Attack.
- 2002 - The North Bay Centennials become the Saginaw Spirit.
- 2007 - The Mississauga Ice Dogs become the Niagara IceDogs and the Toronto St. Michael's Majors become the Mississauga St. Michael's Majors.
- 2012 - The Mississauga St. Michael's Majors become the Mississauga Steelheads.
- 2013 - The Brampton Battalion become the North Bay Battalion.
- 2015 - The Plymouth Whalers become the Flint Firebirds and the Belleville Bulls become the Hamilton Bulldogs.
- 2023 - The Hamilton Bulldogs become the Brantford Bulldogs.
- 2024 - The Mississauga Steelheads become the Brampton Steelheads.

== Cities represented in the OHA, OMJHL, and OHL (since 1937) ==
=== Ontario ===
- Barrie: 1945–60, 1995–present
- Belleville: 1981–2015
- Brampton: 1961–63, 1997–2013, 2024-present
- Brantford: 1941–44, 1978–84, 2023–present
- Cornwall: 1981–92
- Galt (Cambridge): 1943–55
- Guelph: 1937–42, 1947–63, 1982–89, 1991–present
- Hamilton: 1942–44, 1945–47, 1953–76, 1977–78, 1984–88, 1989–91, 2015–23
- Kingston: 1973–present
- Kitchener: 1951–56, 1963–present
- London: 1965–present
- Mississauga: 1998–2024
- Newmarket: 1992–94
- Niagara Falls: 1960–72, 1976–83, 1988–96
- North Bay: 1982–2002, 2013–present
- Oshawa: 1937–53, 1962–present
- Ottawa: 1967–present
- Owen Sound: 1989–present
- Peterborough: 1956–present
- Port Colborne: 1943–45
- Sarnia: 1994–present
- Sault Ste. Marie: 1972–present
- St. Catharines: 1943–77, 2007–present
- Stratford: 1942–44, 1946–51
- Sudbury: 1972–present
- Toronto: 1937–89, 1997–2007 (six teams, 1937–39; four teams, 1939–40, 1941–42; three teams, 1940–41, 1943–48, 1962–63; two teams, 1942–43, 1948–62)
- Unionville (Markham) 1961–63
- Waterloo: 1950–52
- Whitby: 1961–63
- Windsor: 1946–53, 1975–present

=== Quebec ===
- Montreal 1961–72

=== Michigan ===
- Detroit 1990–97 (Held first ever OHL games to be played outdoors in 2013 at Comerica Park)
- Plymouth 1997–2015
- Saginaw 2002–present
- Flint 2015–present

=== Pennsylvania ===
- Erie 1996–present

== Commissioners ==
OMJHL and OHL Commissioners (years in office)

- Tubby Schmalz (September 23, 1974 – December 15, 1978)
- Bill Beagan (December 15, 1978 – January 1979)
- Sherwood Bassin (interim; January–September 1979)
- David Branch (September 17, 1979 – present)

== All-Star Games ==
The Ontario Hockey League All-Star Game was first played in 1977 in Sudbury with Emms Division vs the Leyden Division. The game's winner was awarded the OHL Chrysler Cup. This format continued through 1985.

The OHL / QMJHL All-Star Challenge Series was held from 1986 to 1991. The game's winner was awarded the Chrysler Challenge Cup. Chrysler Canada was the corporate sponsor from 1977 to 1991.

The Canadian Hockey League created the CHL All-Star Challenge in 1992. For four seasons from 1992 to 1995, it incorporated the Western Hockey League, the Ontario Hockey League and the Quebec Major Junior Hockey League into one showcase event. The host league in this case would challenge a combined team from the other two leagues. In 1996 this was replaced with the CHL Top Prospects Game. There was no OHL All-Star game held in 1996.

The OHL All-Star Game was revived in 1997. It was played for 4 consecutive seasons until 2000. Officially it was called the OHL All-Star Classic. The games during this period had different corporate sponsors.

In 2001, the three CHL leagues would play a round-robin style All-Star game named the CHL All-Star Series, the winning league being awarded the Hershey Cup. Each league made two Conference All-Star teams. One would play at home versus a Conference All-Star team from another league, and the other conference would visit another league's team. This format was played for the 2001, 2002 & 2003 seasons.

The event was rebranded as the OHL All-Star Classic from the 2003–04 season onward. The game was previously sponsored by Direct Energy, the most recent corporate sponsor is Bell Canada. The 2007 All Star game was played in Saginaw, Michigan, United States, the first time the game has been hosted outside of Canada.

The OHL discontinued the All-star game as of the 2010–11 season.

=== List of All-Star Game hosts ===
OHL Chrysler Cup

- 1977 - Sudbury Wolves
- 1978 - Windsor Spitfires
- 1979 - S.S. Marie Greyhounds
- 1980 - Kitchener Rangers
- 1981 - Kingston Canadians
- 1982 - Brantford Alexanders
- 1983 - Belleville Bulls
- 1984 - Guelph Platers
- 1985 - Kitchener Rangers

Chrysler Challenge Cup

- 1986 - Ottawa, ON / Hull, QC
- 1987 - Ottawa, ON / Hull, QC
- 1988 - Hamilton, ON
- 1989 - Montreal, QC
- 1990 - Cornwall, ON
- 1991 - Montreal, QC

CHL All-Star Challenge

- 1992 - Saskatoon, SK
- 1993 - Montreal, QC
- 1994 - Moncton, NB
- 1995 - Kitchener, ON

No All-Star Game held in 1996.
1st CHL Top Prospects game was played.

OHL All-Star Classic

- 1997 - Barrie Colts
- 1998 - North Bay Centennials
- 1999 - Sarnia Sting
- 2000 - Mississauga Ice Dogs

CHL All-Star Series - Hershey Cup

- 2001 - Guelph Storm
- 2002 - Ottawa 67's
- 2003 - London Knights

OHL All-Star Classic

- 2004 - Peterborough Petes
- 2005 - Owen Sound Attack
- 2006 - Belleville Bulls
- 2007 - Saginaw Spirit
- 2008 - S.S. Marie Greyhounds
- 2009 - Windsor Spitfires
- 2010 - Kingston Frontenacs
