= Gerry Gray (ice hockey) =

Canadian ice hockey player

- Born: January 28, 1948 (age 78) Brantford, Ontario, Canada
- Height: 6 ft 0 in (183 cm)
- Weight: 165 lb (75 kg; 11 st 11 lb)
- Position: Goaltender
- Shot: Left
- Played for: Detroit Red Wings; New York Islanders
- Playing career: 1965–1978

Gerald Robert Gray (born January 28, 1948) is a Canadian retired professional ice hockey goaltender who played eight games in the National Hockey League.

== Career ==
Gray played with the Detroit Red Wings and New York Islanders between 1971 and 1972. The rest of his career, which lasted from 1968 to 1978, was spent in the minor leagues.

== Career statistics ==
=== Regular season and playoffs ===
			Regular season									Playoffs
Season	Team	League	GP	W	L	T	MIN	GA	SO	GAA	SV%	GP	W	L	MIN	GA	SO	GAA	SV%
1965–66	Hamilton Red Wings	OHA	32	—	—	—	1920	151	0	4.72	—	1	0	0	20	0	0	0	—
1966–67	Hamilton Red Wings	OHA	44	—	—	—	2600	142	1	3.28	—	17	—	—	1020	59	0	3.47	—
1967–68	Hamilton Red Wings	OHA	45	—	—	—	2680	138	0	3.09	—	11	—	—	641	45	0	4.21	—
1968–69	Fort Worth Wings	CHL	40	—	—	—	2125	127	2	3.59	—	—	—	—	—	—	—	—	—
1969–70	Cleveland Barons	AHL	35	—	—	—	1997	131	1	3.94	—	—	—	—	—	—	—	—	—
1970–71	Detroit Red Wings	NHL	7	1	4	1	380	30	0	4.74	.869	—	—	—	—	—	—	—	—
1970–71	Fort Worth Wings	CHL	33	—	—	—	1940	90	2	2.78	—	—	—	—	—	—	—	—	—
1971–72	Tidewater Wings	AHL	18	7	7	2	1009	45	2	2.68	—	—	—	—	—	—	—	—	—
1971–72	Fort Worth Wings	CHL	32	14	11	6	1633	95	0	3.49	—	7	—	—	444	30	0	4.05	—
1972–73	New York Islanders	NHL	1	0	1	0	60	5	0	5.00	—	—	—	—	—	—	—	—	—
1972–73	New Haven Nighthawks	AHL	36	—	—	—	2071	156	0	4.51	—	—	—	—	—	—	—	—	—
1973–74	Jacksonville Barons	CHL	30	5	16	4	1464	113	0	4.63	—	—	—	—	—	—	—	—	—
1974–75	Brantford Foresters	OHA Sr	6	—	—	—	360	27	0	4.56	—	—	—	—	—	—	—	—	—
1975–76	Cambridge Hornets	OHA Sr	22	—	—	—	1320	82	0	3.76	—	—	—	—	—	—	—	—	—
1976–77	Brantford Alexanders	OHA Sr	19	—	—	—	1140	89	1	4.60	—	—	—	—	—	—	—	—	—
1977–78	Brantford Alexanders	OHA Sr	15	—	—	—	900	84	0	5.57	—	—	—	—	—	—	—	—	—
NHL totals			8	1	5	1	440	35	0	4.77	.867	—	—	—	—	—	—	—	—
