= List of OHL seasons =

This is a list of Ontario Hockey League seasons since inception of the league, as well as a list of seasons for its precursor leagues, the Ontario Major Junior Hockey League (OMJHL), and the Ontario Hockey Association Junior A League (OHA).

== OHA seasons ==
1933–34 | 1934–35 | 1935–36 | 1936–37 | 1937–38 | 1938–39 | 1939–40 | 1940–41 | 1941–42 | 1942–43 | 1943–44 | 1944–45 | 1945–46 | 1946–47 | 1947–48 | 1948–49 | 1949–50 | 1950–51 | 1951–52 | 1952–53 | 1953–54 | 1954–55 | 1955–56 | 1956–57 | 1957–58 | 1958–59 | 1959–60 | 1960–61 | 1961–62 | 1962–63 | 1963–64 | 1964–65 | 1965–66 | 1966–67 | 1967–68 | 1968–69 | 1969–70 | 1970–71 | 1971–72 | 1972–73 | 1973–74

== OMJHL seasons ==
1974–75 | 1975–76 | 1976–77 | 1977–78 | 1978–79 | 1979–80

== OHL seasons ==
1980–81 | 1981–82 | 1982–83 | 1983–84 | 1984–85 | 1985–86 | 1986–87 | 1987–88 | 1988–89 | 1989–90 | 1990–91 | 1991–92 | 1992–93 | 1993–94 | 1994–95 | 1995–96 | 1996–97 | 1997–98 | 1998–99 | 1999–00 | 2000–01 | 2001–02 | 2002–03 | 2003–04 | 2004–05 | 2005–06 | 2006–07 | 2007–08 | 2008–09 | 2009–10 | 2010–11 | 2011–12 | 2012–13 | 2013–14 | 2014–15 | 2015–16 | 2016–17 | 2017–18 | 2018–19 | 2019–20 | 2020–21 | 2021–22 | 2022–23 | 2023–24 | 2024–25 | 2025–26 | 2026–27

== See also ==
- List of WHL seasons
- List of QMJHL seasons
