= 1976–77 OMJHL season =

Canadian junior hockey season

The 1976–77 OMJHL season was the third season of the Ontario Major Junior Hockey League (OMJHL). The St. Catharines Black Hawks moved to Niagara Falls, Ontario, becoming the Flyers. Their owner Hap Emms using the name of his former team. The Hamilton Fincups then moved to the vacant Jack Gatecliff Arena in St. Catharines, Ontario after the ice-making machine at the ancient Hamilton Forum broke down irreparably a month before the season began. Twelve teams each played 66 games. The Ottawa 67's won the J. Ross Robertson Cup, defeating the London Knights.

== League business ==
OMJHL commissioner Tubby Schmalz filed legal action against the World Hockey Association on behalf of the OMJHL in 1976, citing failure to pay development fees for junior-aged players Paul Heaver and Bob Russell who turned professional. Schmalz also said legal action to receive payments would be likely for a third player, John Tonelli. Schmalz later announced that an OMJHL team would represent Canada at the 1977 World Junior Ice Hockey Championships, and that the league would operate a small tournament within its schedule to choose the representative.

== Regular season ==
=== Standings ===
Leyden Division	GP	W	L	T	Pts	GF	GA
y-Ottawa 67's	66	38	23	5	81	348	288
x-Sudbury Wolves	66	38	24	4	80	385	290
x-Kingston Canadians	66	32	24	10	74	295	259
x-Peterborough Petes	66	31	28	7	69	307	309
x-Sault Ste. Marie Greyhounds	66	20	41	5	45	261	375
Oshawa Generals	66	5	57	4	14	216	444

Emms Division	GP	W	L	T	Pts	GF	GA
y-St. Catharines Fincups	66	50	11	5	105	438	242
x-London Knights	66	51	13	2	104	379	203
x-Toronto Marlboros	66	31	23	12	74	335	286
x-Kitchener Rangers	66	26	32	8	60	320	380
x-Windsor Spitfires	66	21	37	8	50	294	386
Niagara Falls Flyers	66	15	45	6	36	254	370

=== Scoring leaders ===
Player	Team	GP	G	A	Pts	PIM
Dwight Foster	Kitchener Rangers	64	60	83	143	88
Dale McCourt	St. Catharines Fincups	66	60	79	139	26
Bobby Smith	Ottawa 67's	64	65	70	135	52
Tony McKegney	Kingston Canadians	66	58	77	135	30
Ken Linseman	Kingston Canadians	63	53	74	127	210
Keith Acton	Peterborough Petes	65	52	69	121	93
John Anderson	Toronto Marlboros	64	57	62	119	42
Mike Keating	St. Catharines Fincups	65	51	61	112	96
Ron Mason	Peterborough Petes	62	53	58	111	33
Ric Seiling	St. Catharines Fincups	62	50	61	111	103

== Playoffs ==
=== First round ===
Sault Ste. Marie Greyhounds defeat Peterborough Petes 3–1

Windsor Spitfires defeat Kitchener Rangers 3–0

=== Quarterfinals ===
Ottawa 67's defeat Sault Ste. Marie Greyhounds 4–0, 1 tie

Kingston Canadians defeat Sudbury Wolves 4–1, 1 tie

St. Catharines Fincups defeat Windsor Spitfires 4–2

London Knights defeat Toronto Marlboros 4–1, 1 tie

=== Semifinals ===
Ottawa 67's defeat Kingston Canadians 4–3, 1 tie

London Knights defeat St. Catharines Fincups 4–3, 1 tie

=== J. Ross Robertson Cup ===
Ottawa 67's defeat London Knights 4–2

== Awards ==
J. Ross Robertson Cup:	Ottawa 67's
Hamilton Spectator Trophy:	St. Catharines Fincups
Leyden Trophy:	Ottawa 67's
Emms Trophy:	St. Catharines Fincups
Red Tilson Trophy:	Dale McCourt, St. Catharines Fincups
Eddie Powers Memorial Trophy:	Dwight Foster, Kitchener Rangers
Matt Leyden Trophy:	Bill Long, London Knights
Jim Mahon Memorial Trophy:	John Anderson, Toronto Marlboros
Max Kaminsky Trophy:	Craig Hartsburg, Sault Ste. Marie Greyhounds
Dave Pinkney Trophy:	Pat Riggin, London Knights
Emms Family Award:	Mike Gartner, Niagara Falls Flyers
F. W. "Dinty" Moore Trophy:	Barry Heard, London Knights
William Hanley Trophy:	Dale McCourt, St. Catharines Fincups

== See also ==
- List of OHA Junior A standings
- List of OHL seasons
- 1977 Memorial Cup
- 1977 NHL entry draft
- 1976 in sports
- 1977 in sports

Preceded by 1975–76 OMJHL season	OHL seasons	Succeeded by 1977–78 OMJHL season
