= 1975–76 OMJHL season =

Canadian junior hockey season

The 1975–76 OMJHL season was the second season of the Ontario Major Junior Hockey League (OMJHL). The Windsor Spitfires were added as an expansion team, becoming the twelfth team in the league. The OMJHL splits into two divisions of six teams each. The southern and western teams joined the Emms division, named for Hap Emms. The northern and eastern teams joined the Leyden division, named for Matt Leyden. The OMJHL created three new trophies for the season. The Emms Trophy and the Leyden Trophy are awarded to the regular season champion of their respective divisions. The F. W. "Dinty" Moore Trophy (named for Francis Moore) is inaugurated for the first-year goaltender with the best goals-against-average. Twelve teams each played 66 games. The Hamilton Fincups won the J. Ross Robertson Cup, defeating the Sudbury Wolves.

== League business ==
On May 9, 1975, officials from the OMJHL, Quebec Major Junior Hockey League and the Western Canada Hockey League, announced a constitution to establish the Canadian Major Junior Hockey League (CMJHL) composed of the three league under one umbrella. The new organization wanted standard contracts for all players, consistent dollar amounts for development fees paid by the professional leagues, and for the National Hockey League and the World Hockey Association to work together on a common drafting program to eliminate bidding wars. The CMJHL sought to represent players directly instead of agents, and proposed an escalating development fee schedule if professional teams wanted to sign a player while he was still eligible for junior hockey. The league also proposed to allow some players under professional contracts to continue playing in junior hockey. OMJHL commissioner Tubby Schmalz defended the validity of the constitution, despite a challenge from Alan Eagleson that it violated antitrust laws in Canada and the United States.

In November 1975, Schmalz decreed that future OMJHL games were to be attended by least two off-duty police officers as a deterrent to violence on ice or among the spectators. The statement was in response to incidents from a game involving the London Knights and the St. Catharines Black Hawks. Problems in getting development payments from professional leagues continued, and Schmalz announced the possibility of legal action to recover delinquent fees for drafting junior-aged players.

== Regular season ==
=== Standings ===
Leyden Division	GP	W	L	T	Pts	GF	GA
y-Sudbury Wolves	66	47	11	8	102	384	224
x-Ottawa 67's	66	34	23	9	77	331	291
x-Kingston Canadians	66	33	24	9	75	357	316
x-Oshawa Generals	66	31	27	8	70	312	299
x-Sault Ste. Marie Greyhounds	66	27	26	13	67	341	319
Peterborough Petes	66	18	37	11	47	204	284

Emms Division	GP	W	L	T	Pts	GF	GA
y-Hamilton Fincups	66	43	15	8	94	379	232
x-London Knights	66	31	26	9	71	317	256
x-Toronto Marlboros	66	26	30	10	62	278	294
x-Kitchener Rangers	66	26	35	5	57	298	384
x-St. Catharines Black Hawks	66	16	40	10	42	283	366
Windsor Spitfires	66	12	50	4	28	251	470

=== Scoring leaders ===
Player	Team	GP	G	A	Pts	PIM
Mike Kaszycki	Sault Ste. Marie Greyhounds	66	51	119	170	38
Peter Lee	Ottawa 67's	66	81	80	161	59
Paul Gardner	Oshawa Generals	65	69	75	144	75
Dale McCourt	Hamilton Fincups	66	55	84	139	19
John Tavella	Sault Ste. Marie Greyhounds	64	67	70	137	58
Rod Schutt	Sudbury Wolves	63	72	63	135	42
Ron Duguay	Sudbury Wolves	61	42	92	134	101
Vern Stenlund	London Knights	64	44	75	119	24
Larry Skinner	Ottawa 67's	59	37	78	115	8
Ken Linseman	Kingston Canadians	65	61	51	112	92

== Playoffs ==
=== First round ===
Sault Ste. Marie Greyhounds defeat Oshawa Generals 3–2

Kitchener Rangers defeat St. Catharines Black Hawks 3–1

=== Quarterfinals ===
Sudbury Wolves defeat Sault Ste. Marie Greyhounds 4–2, 1 tie

Ottawa 67's defeat Kingston Canadians 4–2, 1 tie

Hamilton Fincups defeat Kitchener Rangers 4–0

Toronto Marlboros defeat London Knights 4–1

=== Semifinals ===
Sudbury Wolves defeat Ottawa 67's 4–1

Hamilton Fincups defeat Toronto Marlboros 4–0, 1 tie

=== J. Ross Robertson Cup ===
Hamilton Fincups defeat Sudbury Wolves 4–2

== Awards ==
J. Ross Robertson Cup:	Hamilton Fincups
Hamilton Spectator Trophy:	Sudbury Wolves
Leyden Trophy:	Sudbury Wolves
Emms Trophy:	Hamilton Fincups
Red Tilson Trophy:	Peter Lee, Ottawa 67's
Eddie Powers Memorial Trophy:	Mike Kaszycki, Sault Ste. Marie Greyhounds
Matt Leyden Trophy:	Jerry Toppazzini, Sudbury Wolves
Jim Mahon Memorial Trophy:	Peter Lee, Ottawa 67's
Max Kaminsky Trophy:	Rick Green, London Knights
Dave Pinkney Trophy:	Jim Bedard, Sudbury Wolves
Emms Family Award:	John Tavella, Sault Ste. Marie Greyhounds
F.W. 'Dinty' Moore Trophy:	Mark Locken, Hamilton Fincups
William Hanley Trophy:	Dale McCourt, Hamilton Fincups

== See also ==
- List of OHA Junior A standings
- List of OHL seasons
- 1976 Memorial Cup
- 1976 NHL entry draft
- 1975 in sports
- 1976 in sports

Preceded by 1974–75 OMJHL season	OHL seasons	Succeeded by 1976–77 OMJHL season
