= 1977–78 OMJHL season =

Canadian junior hockey season

The 1977–78 OMJHL season was the fourth season of the Ontario Major Junior Hockey League (OMJHL). The Fincups franchise moved back from St. Catharines to Hamilton after a temporary year away from the city due to lack of a suitable arena. The league featured a wealth of scoring talent during the season, with two players recording the league's highest single season point totals. Third season veteran Bobby Smith, edged 17-year-old rookie Wayne Gretzky for the Eddie Powers Memorial Trophy, scoring 192 points; as of 2023, Smith's and Gretzky's (182 points) performance this season still stand as the top two scoring totals in OHL history. Twelve teams each played 68 games. The Peterborough Petes won the J. Ross Robertson Cup, defeating the Hamilton Fincups.

== League business ==
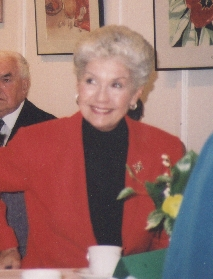
Iona Campagnolo

Hosting duties for the Memorial Cup rotated among the three constituent leagues of the Canadian Major Junior Hockey League CMJHL), since its founding in 1975. OMJHL commissioner Tubby Schmalz announced that two Northern Ontario cities were chosen by the OMJHL to co-host the 1978 Memorial Cup in Sudbury and Sault Ste. Marie.

In February 1978, Iona Campagnolo, the Minister of State of Fitness and Amateur Sport released a report which claimed that junior hockey functioned in the best interests of professional hockey instead of the players. Schmalz said that the CMJHL would welcome a study into its player development programs, if given a say on selecting the inquiry members. He stated an inquiry would reveal that the CMJHL was doing its best for the welfare of the players. He highlighted its academic standards, and stated that the OMJHL fined players who missed classes, suspended players who did not keep up with the workload.

The CMJHL expressed frustration with the 1978 WHA Amateur Draft being held during the junior season and four months earlier than the 1978 NHL Amateur Draft. The league was concerned that its players would be pursued for professional contracts while playing junior hockey, despite the names of drafted players not being released. The league considered having the Canadian Amateur Hockey Association use its International Ice Hockey Federation membership as leverage to block World Hockey Association (WHA) exhibition games against international teams and force the WHA to negotiate. In May 1978, Schmalz stated that the continued signing of junior-aged players by the WHA would mean forfeiture of a $150,000 bond paid as a promise not to sign players before November.

== Regular season ==
=== Standings ===
Leyden Division	GP	W	L	T	Pts	GF	GA
y-Ottawa 67's	68	43	18	7	93	405	308
x-Peterborough Petes	68	37	18	13	87	327	273
x-Oshawa Generals	68	30	26	12	72	320	289
x-Kingston Canadians	68	27	32	9	63	288	323
x-Sault Ste. Marie Greyhounds	68	26	32	10	62	330	346
Sudbury Wolves	68	16	42	10	42	255	377

Emms Division	GP	W	L	T	Pts	GF	GA
y-London Knights	68	35	22	11	81	333	251
x-Windsor Spitfires	68	36	24	6	78	338	289
x-Hamilton Fincups	68	31	23	14	76	273	223
x-Kitchener Rangers	68	26	34	8	60	270	303
x-Toronto Marlboros	68	24	36	8	56	263	341
Niagara Falls Flyers	68	17	41	10	44	261	340

=== Scoring leaders ===
Player	Team	GP	G	A	Pts	PIM
Bobby Smith	Ottawa 67's	61	69	123	192	44
Wayne Gretzky	Sault Ste. Marie Greyhounds	64	70	112	182	14
Dino Ciccarelli	London Knights	68	72	70	142	49
Keith Acton	Peterborough Petes	68	42	86	128	52
Jim Fox	Ottawa 67's	59	44	83	127	12
Gerry Leroux	Windsor Spitfires	68	57	66	123	85
Steve Marengere	Ottawa 67's	65	25	93	118	73
Dan Lucas	Sault Ste. Marie Greyhounds	61	50	67	117	90
Jim MacRae	London Knights	68	50	62	112	58
Don Maloney	Kitchener Rangers	62	30	74	104	143

== Playoffs ==
First Round
L4	Kingston	4
L5	S.S. Marie	6
E4	Kitchener	6
E5	Toronto	4

Quarterfinals
L1	Ottawa	9
L5	S.S. Marie	7
Leyden Division
L2	Peterborough	9
L3	Oshawa	3
L1	London	8
L4	Kitchener	0
Emms Division
L2	Windsor	3
L3	Hamilton	9

Semifinals
L1	Ottawa	7
L2	Peterborough	9
E1	London	5
E3	Hamilton	9

J. Ross Robertson Cup
L2	Peterborough	9
E3	Hamilton	7

== Awards ==
J. Ross Robertson Cup:	Peterborough Petes
Hamilton Spectator Trophy:	Ottawa 67's
Leyden Trophy:	Ottawa 67's
Emms Trophy:	London Knights
Red Tilson Trophy:	Bobby Smith, Ottawa 67's
Eddie Powers Memorial Trophy:	Bobby Smith, Ottawa 67's
Matt Leyden Trophy:	Bill White, Oshawa Generals
Jim Mahon Memorial Trophy:	Dino Ciccarelli, London Knights
Max Kaminsky Trophy:	Brad Marsh, London Knights and Rob Ramage, London Knights
Dave Pinkney Trophy:	Al Jensen, Hamilton Fincups
Emms Family Award:	Wayne Gretzky, Sault Ste. Marie Greyhounds
F.W. 'Dinty' Moore Trophy:	Ken Ellacott, Peterborough Petes
William Hanley Trophy:	Wayne Gretzky, Sault Ste. Marie Greyhounds

== See also ==
- List of OHA Junior A standings
- List of OHL seasons
- 1978 Memorial Cup
- 1978 NHL entry draft
- 1977 in sports
- 1978 in sports

Preceded by 1976–77 OMJHL season	OHL seasons	Succeeded by 1978–79 OMJHL season
