= 1981–82 Winnipeg Jets season =

NHL hockey team season

1981–82 Winnipeg Jets
- Division: 2nd Norris
- Conference: 3rd Campbell
- 1981–82 record: 33–33–14
- Home record: 18–13–9
- Road record: 15–20–5
- Goals for: 319
- Goals against: 332

Team information
- General manager: John Ferguson
- Coach: Tom Watt
- Captain: Dave Christian
- Alternate captains: None
- Arena: Winnipeg Arena
- Minor league affiliate: Tulsa Oilers (CHL)

Team leaders
- Goals: Dale Hawerchuk (45)
- Assists: Dale Hawerchuk (58)
- Points: Dale Hawerchuk (103)
- Penalty minutes: Bryan Maxwell (110)
- Wins: Ed Staniowski (20)
- Goals against average: Ed Staniowski (3.96)

The 1981–82 Winnipeg Jets season was the team's third season in the National Hockey League and tenth season overall. The club's on-ice performance vastly improved compared to the previous season when the Jets won only nine games. The Jets finished with a .500 record and, for the first time in its history, qualified for the Stanley Cup playoffs

== Offseason ==
After a very disappointing 1980–81, in which the Jets won only nine games and finished in last place in the National Hockey League, the club announced on May 14, 1981, that Tom Watt would become the new head coach of the team. Watt spent the 1980–81 season as an assistant coach under Harry Neale on the Vancouver Canucks. This would be Watt's first NHL head coaching job. The Jets also announced that Dave Christian would become the new captain of the team. Christian, who was a part of the 1980 US Olympic Team that won the gold medal, became the third captain of the team since the Jets joined the NHL.

The NHL announced a new divisional realignment based on geography, as the Jets were shifted from the Smythe Division to the Norris Division, where they would join the Chicago Black Hawks, Detroit Red Wings, Minnesota North Stars, St. Louis Blues and Toronto Maple Leafs. On June 10, 1981, the Jets went into the 1981 NHL entry draft with the first overall selection, and the club used it to select Dale Hawerchuk from the Cornwall Royals of the QMJHL. Hawerchuk scored 81 goals and 183 points in 72 games with Cornwall, followed by 15 goals and 35 points in 19 playoff games with the team, leading them to the President's Cup. At the 1981 Memorial Cup, Hawerchuk had eight goals and 12 points in five games, leading Cornwall to the championship. With their second selection, Winnipeg selected Scott Arniel, who also played with the Cornwall Royals. Arniel had 52 goals and 123 points with Cornwall, followed by 14 goals and 33 points in 19 playoff games, and six goals and eight points in five Memorial Cup games, helping the Royals win the 1981 Memorial Cup.

On July 3, 1981, Winnipeg acquired Bryan Maxwell, Ed Staniowski and Paul MacLean from the St. Louis Blues for Scott Campbell and John Markell. Maxwell, a stay-at-home defenseman, had three goals and 13 points in 40 games with the Blues in 1980–81, while Staniowski posted a 10–3–3 record with a 4.28 GAA in 19 games as a backup to Mike Liut in St. Louis. MacLean had 36 goals and 78 points in 80 games with the Salt Lake Golden Eagles of the CHL.

Twelve days later on July 15, 1981, the Jets were involved in a three-way deal with the Colorado Rockies and Vancouver Canucks. Winnipeg originally traded Ivan Hlinka to the Vancouver Canucks for Brent Ashton and the Canucks fourth round draft pick at the 1982 NHL entry draft. The Jets then traded Ashton and their own third round pick in the 1982 NHL entry draft to the Colorado Rockies for Lucien DeBlois. DeBlois had 26 goals and 42 points in 74 games with Colorado during the 1980–81 season.

One day before the regular season began, on October 5, 1981, the Jets picked up Serge Savard from the Montreal Canadiens in the waiver draft. Savard, who played with the Canadiens since the 1966–67 season, had four goals and 17 points in 77 games during the 1980–81 season. Savard was a seven time Stanley Cup champion.

== Regular season ==
=== Final standings ===
Norris Division
	GP	W	L	T	GF	GA	Pts
**Minnesota North Stars**	80	37	23	20	346	288	94
**Winnipeg Jets**	80	33	33	14	319	332	80
**St. Louis Blues**	80	32	40	8	315	349	72
**Chicago Black Hawks**	80	30	38	12	332	363	72
Toronto Maple Leafs	80	20	44	16	298	380	56
Detroit Red Wings	80	21	47	12	270	351	54

Note: GP = Games played, W = Wins, L = Losses, T = Ties, Pts = Points, GF = Goals for, GA = Goals against
Note: Teams that qualified for the playoffs are highlighted in bold.

=== Record vs. opponents ===
Norris Division record vs. opponents

==== Vs. Campbell Conference ====
**Vs. Norris Division**

1981–82 NHL records
Team	**CHI**	**DET**	**MIN**	**STL**	**TOR**	**WIN**	**Total**
Chicago	—	3−3−1	3−3−1	2−4−1	3−4	2−3−2	13−17−5
Detroit	3−3−1	—	1−6	2−5	3−3−1	2−3−2	11−20−4
Minnesota	3−3−1	6−1	—	3−3−1	4−0−3	3−3−1	19−10−6
St. Louis	4−2−1	5−2	3−3−1	—	5−2	1−4−2	18−13−4
Toronto	4−3	3−3−1	0−4−3	2−5	—	2−4−1	11−19−5
Winnipeg	3−2−2	3−2−2	3−3−1	4−1−2	4−2−1	—	17−10−8

**Vs. Smythe Division**

1981–82 NHL records
Team	**CGY**	**COL**	**EDM**	**LAK**	**VAN**	**Total**
Chicago	2−0−1	1−2	1−1−1	3−0	1−2	8−5−2
Detroit	1−1−1	3−0	0−2−1	1−2	1−1−1	6−6−3
Minnesota	1−0−2	1−0−2	0−2−1	2−0−1	1−1−1	5−3−7
St. Louis	2−1	2−1	0−3	1−2	2−1	7−8−0
Toronto	0−1−2	1−0−2	1−2	2−1	0−2−1	4−6−5
Winnipeg	2−1	2−1	1−2	3−0	1−2	9−6−0

**Vs. Wales Conference**

**Vs. Adams Division**

1981–82 NHL records
Team	**BOS**	**BUF**	**HFD**	**MTL**	**QUE**	**Total**
Chicago	2−1	1−2	1−1−1	0−2−1	1−2	5−8−2
Detroit	0−2−1	0−3	0−2−1	1−2	0−3	1−12−2
Minnesota	2−1	1−1−1	2−1	0−1−2	2−0−1	7−4−4
St. Louis	1−1−1	1−2	1−2	0−2−1	1−2	4−9−2
Toronto	0−3	0−2−1	0−3	0−2−1	1−1−1	1−11−3
Winnipeg	0−3	0−1−2	1−2	0−1−2	0−2−1	1−9−5

**Vs. Patrick Division**

1981–82 NHL records
Team	**NYI**	**NYR**	**PHI**	**PIT**	**WSH**	**Total**
Chicago	0−3	0−3	1−1−1	1−0−2	2−1	4−8−3
Detroit	0−3	1−2	0−2−1	2−1	0−1−2	3−9−3
Minnesota	0−2−1	1−2	1−1−1	2−1	2−0−1	6−6−3
St. Louis	0−2−1	0−2−1	0−3	2−1	1−2	3−10−2
Toronto	0−3	1−1−1	1−2	1−0−2	1−2	4−8−3
Winnipeg	1−2	1−1−1	2–1	1–2	1−2	6–8–1

== Schedule and results ==
1981–82 regular season
October

Game	Result	Date	Score	Opponent	Record	Attendance
1	L	October 6, 1981	1–6	Toronto Maple Leafs (1981–82)	0–1–0	11,410
2	W	October 9, 1981	8–3	New York Rangers (1981–82)	1–1–0	12,377
3	W	October 14, 1981	4–2	@ Edmonton Oilers (1981–82)	2–1–0	17,430
4	W	October 15, 1981	5–4	@ Calgary Flames (1981–82)	3–1–0	7,226
5	L	October 18, 1981	3–4	Colorado Rockies (1981–82)	3–2–0	11,499
6	T	October 21, 1981	2–2	@ Buffalo Sabres (1981–82)	3–2–1	14,745
7	T	October 23, 1981	5–5	Chicago Black Hawks (1981–82)	3–2–2	13,169
8	W	October 25, 1981	9–4	Los Angeles Kings (1981–82)	4–2–2	10,664
9	L	October 28, 1981	6–7	@ Chicago Black Hawks (1981–82)	4–3–2	8,493
10	W	October 31, 1981	6–5	@ Toronto Maple Leafs (1981–82)	5–3–2	16,360

November

Game	Result	Date	Score	Opponent	Record	Attendance
11	W	November 3, 1981	5–3	@ Colorado Rockies (1981–82)	6–3–2	5,126
12	W	November 6, 1981	4–3	Chicago Black Hawks (1981–82)	7–3–2	13,484
13	L	November 8, 1981	1–5	@ Vancouver Canucks (1981–82)	7–4–2	12,533
14	L	November 10, 1981	3–5	New York Islanders (1981–82)	7–5–2	13,494
15	L	November 11, 1981	2–15	@ Minnesota North Stars (1981–82)	7–6–2	14,244
16	W	November 14, 1981	3–2	@ Los Angeles Kings (1981–82)	8–6–2	10,363
17	L	November 17, 1981	4–6	@ Calgary Flames (1981–82)	8–7–2	7,226
18	L	November 18, 1981	4–6	Minnesota North Stars (1981–82)	8–8–2	10,992
19	T	November 21, 1981	1–1	@ St. Louis Blues (1981–82)	8–8–3	16,316
20	W	November 22, 1981	5–4	St. Louis Blues (1981–82)	9–8–3	12,287
21	W	November 25, 1981	7–2	Colorado Rockies (1981–82)	10–8–3	11,363
22	T	November 27, 1981	5–5	Minnesota North Stars (1981–82)	10–8–4	13,903
23	L	November 29, 1981	2–10	Edmonton Oilers (1981–82)	10–9–4	15,756

December

Game	Result	Date	Score	Opponent	Record	Attendance
24	L	December 1, 1981	1–2	@ Philadelphia Flyers (1981–82)	10–10–4	17,077
25	L	December 2, 1981	2–4	@ Pittsburgh Penguins (1981–82)	10–11–4	8,829
26	L	December 4, 1981	3–7	@ Washington Capitals (1981–82)	10–12–4	10,605
27	W	December 6, 1981	5–2	New York Islanders (1981–82)	11–12–4	12,877
28	T	December 9, 1981	3–3	@ Toronto Maple Leafs (1981–82)	11–12–5	16,215
29	T	December 11, 1981	5–5	Montreal Canadiens (1981–82)	11–12–6	15,652
30	L	December 13, 1981	1–2	Detroit Red Wings (1981–82)	11–13–6	13,011
31	T	December 16, 1981	3–3	@ Chicago Black Hawks (1981–82)	11–13–7	10,236
32	W	December 17, 1981	4–2	@ Minnesota North Stars (1981–82)	12–13–7	14,995
33	L	December 19, 1981	4–8	Toronto Maple Leafs (1981–82)	12–14–7	12,689
34	W	December 20, 1981	5–4	St. Louis Blues (1981–82)	13–14–7	12,691
35	L	December 22, 1981	2–5	@ New York Islanders (1981–82)	13–15–7	14,806
36	L	December 23, 1981	2–5	@ New York Rangers (1981–82)	13–16–7	17,422
37	L	December 26, 1981	2–3	Chicago Black Hawks (1981–82)	13–17–7	13,778
38	T	December 27, 1981	2–2	Detroit Red Wings (1981–82)	13–17–8	14,257
39	L	December 30, 1981	1–6	Hartford Whalers (1981–82)	13–18–8	10,470

January

Game	Result	Date	Score	Opponent	Record	Attendance
40	L	January 3, 1982	5–8	Boston Bruins (1981–82)	13–19–8	14,419
41	W	January 6, 1982	5–3	@ Hartford Whalers (1981–82)	14–19–8	12,097
42	L	January 7, 1982	6–8	@ Boston Bruins (1981–82)	14–20–8	11,240
43	W	January 9, 1982	4–2	@ Detroit Red Wings (1981–82)	15–20–8	14,234
44	T	January 10, 1982	4–4	Montreal Canadiens (1981–82)	15–20–9	15,269
45	W	January 13, 1982	6–1	Pittsburgh Penguins (1981–82)	16–20–9	11,483
46	T	January 15, 1982	4–4	New York Rangers (1981–82)	16–20–10	12,533
47	L	January 17, 1982	5–7	Quebec Nordiques (1981–82)	16–21–10	14,061
48	W	January 20, 1982	3–0	Washington Capitals (1981–82)	17–21–10	10,649
49	W	January 22, 1982	6–5	Chicago Black Hawks (1981–82)	18–21–10	12,847
50	T	January 26, 1982	3–3	@ Detroit Red Wings (1981–82)	18–21–11	9,202
51	W	January 27, 1982	4–3	@ Toronto Maple Leafs (1981–82)	19–21–11	16,308
52	L	January 30, 1982	1–2	@ Pittsburgh Penguins (1981–82)	19–22–11	13,842

February

Game	Result	Date	Score	Opponent	Record	Attendance
53	L	February 2, 1982	6–10	@ St. Louis Blues (1981–82)	19–23–11	6,502
54	W	February 5, 1982	6–4	Calgary Flames (1981–82)	20–23–11	14,406
55	L	February 10, 1982	3–4	@ Buffalo Sabres (1981–82)	20–24–11	15,260
56	L	February 13, 1982	3–7	@ Montreal Canadiens (1981–82)	20–25–11	16,422
57	L	February 16, 1982	3–7	@ Quebec Nordiques (1981–82)	20–26–11	15,265
58	T	February 19, 1982	4–4	Quebec Nordiques (1981–82)	20–26–12	13,661
59	L	February 21, 1982	3–6	Washington Capitals (1981–82)	20–27–12	13,395
60	W	February 24, 1982	6–2	Philadelphia Flyers (1981–82)	21–27–12	13,779
61	T	February 26, 1982	4–4	Buffalo Sabres (1981–82)	21–27–13	15,794
62	W	February 28, 1982	5–2	St. Louis Blues (1981–82)	22–27–13	13,308

March

Game	Result	Date	Score	Opponent	Record	Attendance
63	W	March 2, 1982	7–6	@ Philadelphia Flyers (1981–82)	23–27–13	16,912
64	W	March 3, 1982	4–2	@ Chicago Black Hawks (1981–82)	24–27–13	10,523
65	W	March 5, 1982	2–0	Detroit Red Wings (1981–82)	25–27–13	14,803
66	W	March 7, 1982	5–2	Vancouver Canucks (1981–82)	26–27–13	14,727
67	L	March 10, 1982	2–6	@ Hartford Whalers (1981–82)	26–28–13	11,858
68	L	March 11, 1982	4–7	@ Boston Bruins (1981–82)	26–29–13	12,333
69	W	March 13, 1982	10–2	@ Toronto Maple Leafs (1981–82)	27–29–13	16,360
70	W	March 16, 1982	7–3	@ St. Louis Blues (1981–82)	28–29–13	12,167
71	W	March 17, 1982	3–2	@ Minnesota North Stars (1981–82)	29–29–13	15,784
72	W	March 20, 1982	7–0	Toronto Maple Leafs (1981–82)	30–29–13	15,253
73	W	March 21, 1982	8–2	Detroit Red Wings (1981–82)	31–29–13	13,378
74	W	March 24, 1982	5–3	Los Angeles Kings (1981–82)	32–29–13	12,711
75	T	March 26, 1982	4–4	St. Louis Blues (1981–82)	32–29–14	15,790
76	L	March 28, 1982	0–5	@ Vancouver Canucks (1981–82)	32–30–14	16,079
77	W	March 30, 1982	7–5	@ Minnesota North Stars (1981–82)	33–30–14	15,784
78	L	March 31, 1982	2–4	@ Detroit Red Wings (1981–82)	33–31–14	9,654

April

Game	Result	Date	Score	Opponent	Record	Attendance
79	L	April 2, 1982	2–5	Minnesota North Stars (1981–82)	33–32–14	15,351
80	L	April 4, 1982	1–2	@ Edmonton Oilers (1981–82)	33–33–14	17,490

Legend: Win (2 points) Loss (0 points) Tie (1 point)

== Playoffs ==
They faced the St. Louis Blues in the Division Semifinals, losing 3 games to 1.

== Player statistics ==
=== Scoring ===
- Position abbreviations: C = Centre; D = Defence; G = Goaltender; LW = Left wing; RW = Right wing
- † = Joined team via a transaction (e.g., trade, waivers, signing) during the season. Stats reflect time with the Jets only.

No.	Player	Pos	Regular season						Playoffs					
No.	Player	Pos	GP	G	A	Pts	+/-	PIM	GP	G	A	Pts	+/-	PIM
10	Dale Hawerchuk	C	80	45	58	103	−7	47	4	1	7	8	−5	5
12	Morris Lukowich	LW	77	43	49	92	−4	102	4	0	2	2	−2	16
13	Dave Christian	C	80	25	51	76	−40	28	4	0	1	1	−8	2
44	Dave Babych	D	79	19	49	68	−9	92	4	1	2	3	−8	29
15	Paul MacLean	RW	74	36	25	61	−8	106	4	3	2	5	−3	20
20	Willy Lindstrom	RW	74	32	27	59	12	33	4	2	1	3	0	2
23	Lucien DeBlois	RW	65	25	27	52	−10	87	4	2	1	3	−3	4
22	Bengt Lundholm	LW	66	14	30	44	4	10	4	1	1	2	0	2
25	Thomas Steen	C	73	15	29	44	16	42	4	0	4	4	−1	2
28	Norm Dupont	LW	62	13	25	38	−24	22	4	2	0	2	−3	0
9	Doug Smail	LW	72	17	18	35	−22	55	4	0	0	0	0	0
17	Larry Hopkins	LW	41	10	15	25	8	22	4	0	0	0	−5	2
7	Tim Watters	D	69	2	22	24	13	97	4	0	1	1	−1	8
24	Ron Wilson	C	39	3	13	16	−4	49	—	—	—	—	—	—
14	Tim Trimper	LW	74	8	8	16	−7	100	1	0	0	0	0	0
27	Don Spring	D	78	0	16	16	−10	21	4	0	0	0	−8	4
21	Craig Levie	D	40	4	9	13	2	48	—	—	—	—	—	—
2	Moe Mantha	D	25	0	12	12	−10	28	4	1	3	4	4	16
3	Bryan Maxwell	D	45	1	9	10	−11	110	—	—	—	—	—	—
11	Scott Arniel	C	17	1	8	9	2	14	3	0	0	0	−1	0
18	Serge Savard†	D	47	2	5	7	−9	26	4	0	0	0	−3	2
8	Jimmy Mann	RW	37	3	2	5	−8	79	2	0	0	0	0	7
31	Ed Staniowski	G	45	0	5	5		4	2	0	0	0		0
6	Barry Legge	D	38	1	2	3	−6	57	—	—	—	—	—	—
33	Doug Soetaert	G	39	0	2	2		14	2	0	0	0		0
4	Barry Long	D	5	0	2	2	−1	4	—	—	—	—	—	—
26	Murray Eaves	C	2	0	0	0	0	0	—	—	—	—	—	—
5	Dan Geoffrion	RW	1	0	0	0	0	5	—	—	—	—	—	—
16	Rick Bowness	RW	—	—	—	—	—	—	1	0	0	0	−2	0

=== Goaltending ===
No.	Player	Regular season										Playoffs								
No.	Player	GP	W	L	T	SA	GA	GAA	SV%	SO	TOI	GP	W	L	SA	GA	GAA	SV%	SO	TOI
31	Ed Staniowski	45	20	19	6	1405	174	3.96	.876	1	2637	2	0	2	42	12	6.05	.714	0	119
33	Doug Soetaert	39	13	14	8	1188	155	4.32	.870	2	2155	2	1	1	62	8	4.00	.871	0	120

== Awards and records ==
- Calder Memorial Trophy: Dale Hawerchuk
- Jack Adams Award: Tom Watt

== Transactions ==
=== Trades ===
July 3, 1981	To St. Louis Blues Scott Campbell; John Markell	To Winnipeg Jets Bryan Maxwell; Ed Staniowski; Paul MacLean
July 15, 1981	To Vancouver Canucks Ivan Hlinka	To Winnipeg Jets Brent Ashton; 4th round pick in 1982 – Tom Martin
July 15, 1981	To Colorado Rockies Brent Ashton; 2nd round pick in 1982 – Dave Kasper	To Winnipeg Jets Lucien DeBlois
July 27, 1981	To Minnesota North Stars Lindsay Middlebrook	To Winnipeg Jets Cash
September 8, 1981	To New York Rangers 3rd round pick in 1983 – Vesa Salo	To Winnipeg Jets Doug Soetaert
December 19, 1981	To Montreal Canadiens 6th round pick in 1982 – Ernie Vargas	To Winnipeg Jets Serge Savard

=== Waivers ===
October 5, 1981	From Montreal Canadiens Craig Levie

=== Free agents ===
Acquired Player	Former team
Bengt Lundholm	Undrafted Free Agent

Departing Player	New Team
Michel Dion	Pittsburgh Penguins

== Draft picks ==
The Jets selected the following players at the 1981 NHL entry draft, which was held at the Montreal Forum in Montreal, on June 10, 1981.

=== NHL amateur draft ===
Round	Pick	Player	Nationality	College/Junior/Club team
1	1	Dale Hawerchuk (C)	Canada	Cornwall Royals (QMJHL)
2	22	Scott Arniel (LW)	Canada	Cornwall Royals (QMJHL)
3	43	Jyrki Seppa (D)	Finland	Ilves Tampere (SM-liiga)
4	64	Kirk McCaskill (LW)	Canada	University of Vermont (NCAA)
5	85	Marc Behrend (G)	United States	University of Wisconsin (NCAA)
6	106	Bob O'Connor (G)	United States	Boston College (NCAA)
7	127	Peter Nilsson (D)	Sweden	Hammarby IK (SEL)
8	148	Dan McFall (D)	United States	Buffalo Jr. Sabres (NYPJHL)
9	169	Greg Dick (D)	United States	Saint Mary's University of Minnesota (NCAA)
10	190	Vladimir Kadlec (D)	Czechoslovakia	HC Vitkovice (Czech.)
11	211	Dave Kirwin (D)	United States	Irondale (MN) High School

== See also ==
- 1981–82 NHL season
