= 1981 Memorial Cup =

Canadian junior men's ice hockey championship

Tournament details
- Venue(s): Windsor Arena; Windsor, Ontario
- Dates: May 3–15, 1981
- Teams: 3

Final positions
- Champions: Cornwall Royals (QMJHL) (3rd title)

Tournament statistics
- Games played: 7

The Memorial Cup trophy

The 1981 Memorial Cup occurred May 3–15 at the Windsor Arena in Windsor, Ontario. It was the 63rd annual Memorial Cup competition and determined the major junior ice hockey champion of the Canadian Hockey League (CHL). Participating teams were the winners of the Ontario Hockey League, Quebec Major Junior Hockey League and Western Hockey League which were the Kitchener Rangers, Cornwall Royals and Victoria Cougars. Cornwall won their second Memorial Cup in a row and third overall, defeating Kitchener in the final game.

== Teams ==
QMJHL Team OHL Team WHL Team Host City

=== Cornwall Royals ===
The Cornwall Royals represented the Quebec Major Junior Hockey League at the 1981 Memorial Cup. This marked the second consecutive appearance by Cornwall at the tournament. The Royals were the top team during the 1980-81 season, earning a record of 44-26-2 for 90 points and winning the Jean Rougeau Trophy. The Royals had the most potent offense in the QMJHL, scoring a league high 403 goals. Defensively, Cornwall ranked second as they allowed 311 goals. In the QMJHL quarter-finals, the Royals were nearly upset the Quebec Remparts, however, Cornwall was able to win the series four games to three. The Royals were again pushed to a seventh game during the QMJHL semi-finals before finally defeating the Sherbrooke Castors four games to three. In the President's Cup finals, the Royals had an easier time with the Trois-Rivières Draveurs, winning the series four games to one to clinch the QMJHL championship and earn a berth into the 1981 Memorial Cup.

The Royals high-scoring offense was led by Dale Hawerchuk, who led the league with 81 goals and 183 points in 72 games. Hawerchuk tied for the team league in post-season scoring, scoring 15 goals and 35 points in 17 games. Following the season, Hawerchuk was awarded the Michel Brière Memorial Trophy as the Most Valuable Player in the QMJHL, the Jean Béliveau Trophy as the Top Scorer in the League, and the Mike Bossy Trophy as the QMJHL's top prospect. Hawerchuk would be selected first overall by the Winnipeg Jets at the 1981 NHL entry draft. Scott Arniel scored 52 goals and 123 points to rank seventh in league scoring. Arniel was also selected by Winnipeg during the 1981 NHL entry draft with the twenty-second overall selection. Marc Crawford had a very solid season, 42 goals and 99 points in 63 games. Crawford also led the Royals with 242 penalty minutes. In the post-season, Crawford scored a team high 20 goals, and tied Hawerchuk for the team league in points with 35, in 17 games. John Kirk joined the Royals after spending time with the Sudbury Wolves for the 1980-81 season. In 55 games, Kirk scored 47 goals and 98 points. Overaged player Gilles Crepeau scored 40 goals and 94 points in 61 games. On defense, Fred Boimistruck scored 22 goals and 70 points in 68 games to lead the Royals. In goal, Joe Mantione emerged as the starting goaltender late in the season and the playoffs, as he earned a 21-5-0 record with a 3.97 GAA and a .873 save percentage. In the post-season, Mantione was 12-3 with a 3.40 GAA and a .880 save percentage in 17 games. For the Memorial Cup, the Sherbrooke Castors goaltender Corrado Micalef was loaned to the Royals.

The 1981 Memorial Cup was the Roysls third appearance in team history. The club had previously won the 1972 Memorial Cup and the 1980 Memorial Cup.

=== Kitchener Rangers ===
The Kitchener Rangers represented the Ontario Hockey League at the 1981 Memorial Cup. Despite finishing the 1980-81 season with a mediocre 34-33-1 record and earning 69 points, the Rangers were the top club in the Emms Division. The Rangers offense produced 321 goals, ranking the team in a tie for seventh in the twelve team league. Defensively, the Rangers allowed 320 goals, ranking them fifth in the league. In the Emms Division semi-finals, Kitchener defeated the Niagara Falls Flyers four games to two, with one game ending in a tie. In the Emms Division finals, the Rangers easily beat the Windsor Spitfires four games to zero, and having a game end in a draw. In the OHL finals against the top ranked Sault Ste. Marie Greyhounds, Kitchener stunned the Greyhounds winning three games to one, with three games ending in a tie. The series victory clinched the J. Ross Robertson Cup and earned a berth into the 1981 Memorial Cup.

The Rangers offense was led by sixteen year old rookie Brian Bellows, who scored 47 goals and 116 points in 66 games. Bellows led the Rangers in post-season goals with 14, and added 13 assists for 27 points in 16 games. Jeff Larmer had a breakout season, as he led the Rangers with 54 goals, and finished second in team scoring with 108 points in 68 games. Grant Martin finished the season with 41 goals and 98 points. In the post-season, Martin scored a team high 29 points in 18 games. Joe McDonell led the Rangers defense with 15 goals and 65 points in 66 games. In goal, Wendell Young was the Rangers starter, as he earned a record of 19-15-0 with a 4.44 GAA in 42 games.

The 1981 Memorial Cup was the Rangers first appearance at the tournament in club history. A previous Kitchener-based team, the Kitchener Colts, lost in the final round of the 1923 Memorial Cup.

=== Victoria Cougars ===
The Victoria Cougars represented the Western Hockey League at the 1981 Memorial Cup. The Cougars were the top team in the WHL during the 1980-81, setting a league record with 60 wins, and earning 121 points, the second highest total in WHL history, as the club won the Scotty Munro Memorial Trophy. The high scoring Cougars scored a league best 462 goals, while their defense also ranked first as they allowed a league-low 217 goals. In the West Division semi-finals, Victoria swept the Spokane Flyers in four games. In the division finals, the Cougars stayed red hot, defeating the Portland Winter Hawks four games to zero, to advance to the WHL finals. In the final series against the Calgary Wranglers for the President's Cup, the Cougars narrowly defeated the Wranglers four games to three to clinch the championship and a berth into the 1981 Memorial Cup.

The Cougars offense was led by Barry Pederson, who in 55 games, scored 65 goals and 147 points to lead the club, and rank third in WHL scoring. Pederson led the Cougars in post-season scoring, scoring 15 goals and 36 points in 15 games. Rich Chernomaz was acquired by Victoria in a trade with the Saskatoon Blades prior to the season. Chernomaz scored 49 goals and 113 points in 72 games. Torrie Robertson was a third member of the Cougars to crack the 100-point plateau, as he scored 45 goals and 111 points in 59 games after he was returned to junior hockey after starting the season in the NHL with the Washington Capitals. Goaltender Grant Fuhr emerged as a top prospect during the season, as in 59 games, Fuhr posted a record of 48-9-1 with a 2.78 GAA and a .908 save percentage. Fuhr would be selected with the eighth overall pick at the 1981 NHL entry draft by the Edmonton Oilers.

The 1981 Memorial Cup was the Cougars first appearance in team history.

== Round-robin standings ==
Pos	Team	Pld	W	L	GF	GA	
1	Cornwall Royals (QMJHL)	4	3	1	21	14	Advanced to final
2	Kitchener Rangers (OHL)	4	2	2	17	19	Advanced to final
3	Victoria Cougars (WHL)	4	1	3	14	19	

== Scores ==
Round-robin

- May 3 Cornwall 6-3 Kitchener
- May 4 Victoria 7-4 Kitchener
- May 5 Cornwall 3-1 Victoria
- May 6 Kitchener 6-4 Cornwall
- May 7 Kitchener 4-2 Victoria
- May 8 Cornwall 8-4 Victoria

Final

- May 10 Cornwall 8-2 Kitchener

== Winning roster ==
1980-81 Cornwall Royals
Goaltenders: 1 – Tom Graovac; 1 – Corrado Micalef; 30 – Joe Mantione	Defencemen: 2 – Craig Halliday; 3 – Fred Arthur; 5 – Eric Calder; 6 – Marc Lalonde; 7 – Robert Savard - A; 20 – Fred Boimistruck - A	Wingers: 11 – Marc Crawford - C; 12 – Stephen Molaski; 14 – Roy Russell; 15 – Gerard Peltier; 17 – Gilles Crepeau; 18 – Sandy Mitchell; 19 – Dan Frawley; 24 – John Kirk; 27 – Jeff Eatough	Centres: 9 – Doug Gilmour; 10 – Dale Hawerchuk - A; 22 – Scott Arniel; Coach: Bob Kilger; General Manager: Bob Kilger

== Award winners ==
- Stafford Smythe Memorial Trophy (MVP): Dale Hawerchuk, Cornwall
- George Parsons Trophy (Sportsmanship): Mark Morrison, Victoria
- Hap Emms Memorial Trophy (Goaltender): Corrado Micalef, Cornwall

All-star team

- Goal: Corrado Micalef, Cornwall
- Defence: Fred Arthur, Cornwall; Joe McDonnell, Kitchener
- Centre: Dale Hawerchuk, Cornwall
- Left wing: Marc Crawford, Cornwall
- Right wing: Brian Bellows, Kitchener
