= 1980 in ice hockey =

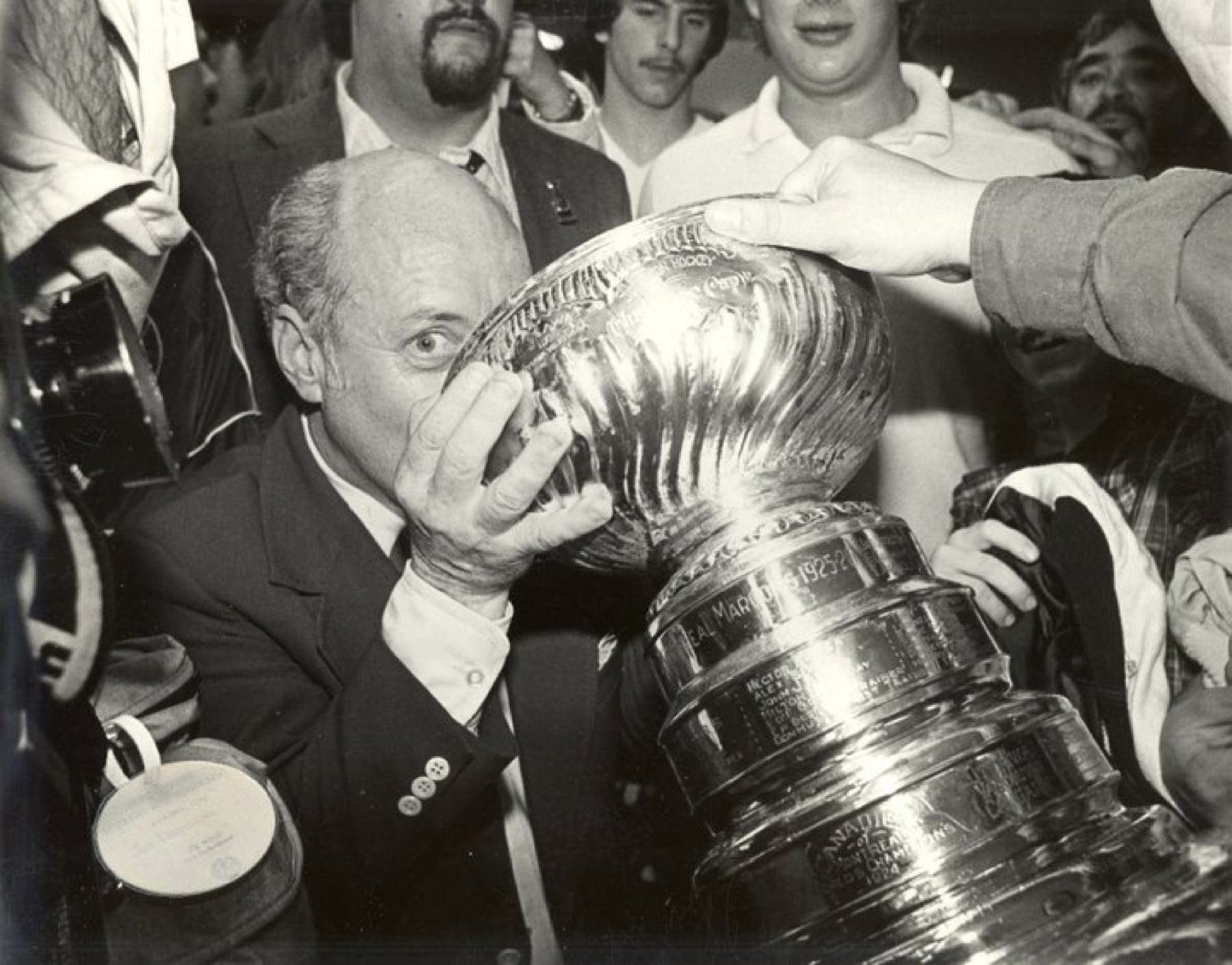
Roger celebrating the New York islanders' first Stanley cup

The following is a chronicle of events during the year 1980 in ice hockey.

== National Hockey League ==
- Art Ross Trophy as the NHL's leading scorer during the regular season: Marcel Dionne, Los Angeles Kings
- Hart Memorial Trophy: for the NHL's Most Valuable Player: Wayne Gretzky, Edmonton Oilers
- Stanley Cup - New York Islanders defeat the Philadelphia Flyers 4 games to 2.

== Canadian Hockey League ==
- Ontario Hockey League: Peterborough Petes won J. Ross Robertson Cup.
- Quebec Major Junior Hockey League: Cornwall Royals won President's Cup (QMJHL)
- Western Hockey League: Regina Pats won President's Cup (WHL)
- Memorial Cup: Cornwall Royals defeated Peterborough Petes

== World Hockey Championship ==
  - Men's champion: Olympic year, no tournament
  - Junior Men's champion: Soviet Union defeated Finland

== Winter Olympics ==
- February - 1980 Winter Olympics: The United States men's hockey team wins the gold medal, defeating Finland in their last medal round game. Their extraordinary upset victory over the heavily favoured Soviet Union team in their previous medal round game became known as the "Miracle on Ice" in the US press.

== Minor League hockey ==
- American Hockey League: Hershey Bears Calder Cup
- IHL: The Kalamazoo Wings capture the Turner Cup.

== Season articles ==
1979–80 NHL season	1980–81 NHL season
1979–80 AHL season	1980–81 AHL season
