= Daniel Frawley =

Daniel Frawley can refer to:

- Dan Frawley (1882–1967), Australian rugby league footballer
- Dan Frawley (ice hockey) (born 1962), Canadian ice hockey player
- Danny Frawley (1963–2019), Australian rules footballer
