= Doug Gilmour =

Canadian ice hockey player (born 1963)

- Hockey Hall of Fame, 2011
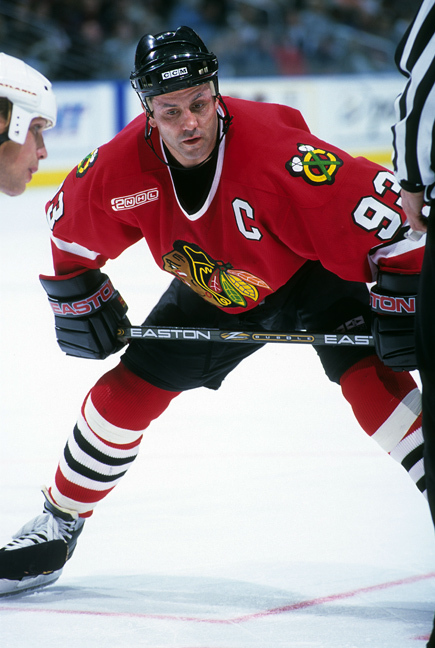
- Gilmour with the Chicago Blackhawks in 2000
- Born: June 25, 1963 (age 63) Kingston, Ontario, Canada
- Height: 5 ft 10 in (178 cm)
- Weight: 177 lb (80 kg; 12 st 9 lb)
- Position: Centre
- Shot: Left
- Played for: St. Louis Blues; Calgary Flames; Toronto Maple Leafs; New Jersey Devils; Chicago Blackhawks; Buffalo Sabres; Montreal Canadiens
- National team: Canada
- NHL draft: 134th overall, 1982; St. Louis Blues
- Playing career: 1983–2003
Medal record
Representing Canada
Ice hockey
Canada Cup
Gold medal – first place	1987 Canada	Ice Hockey

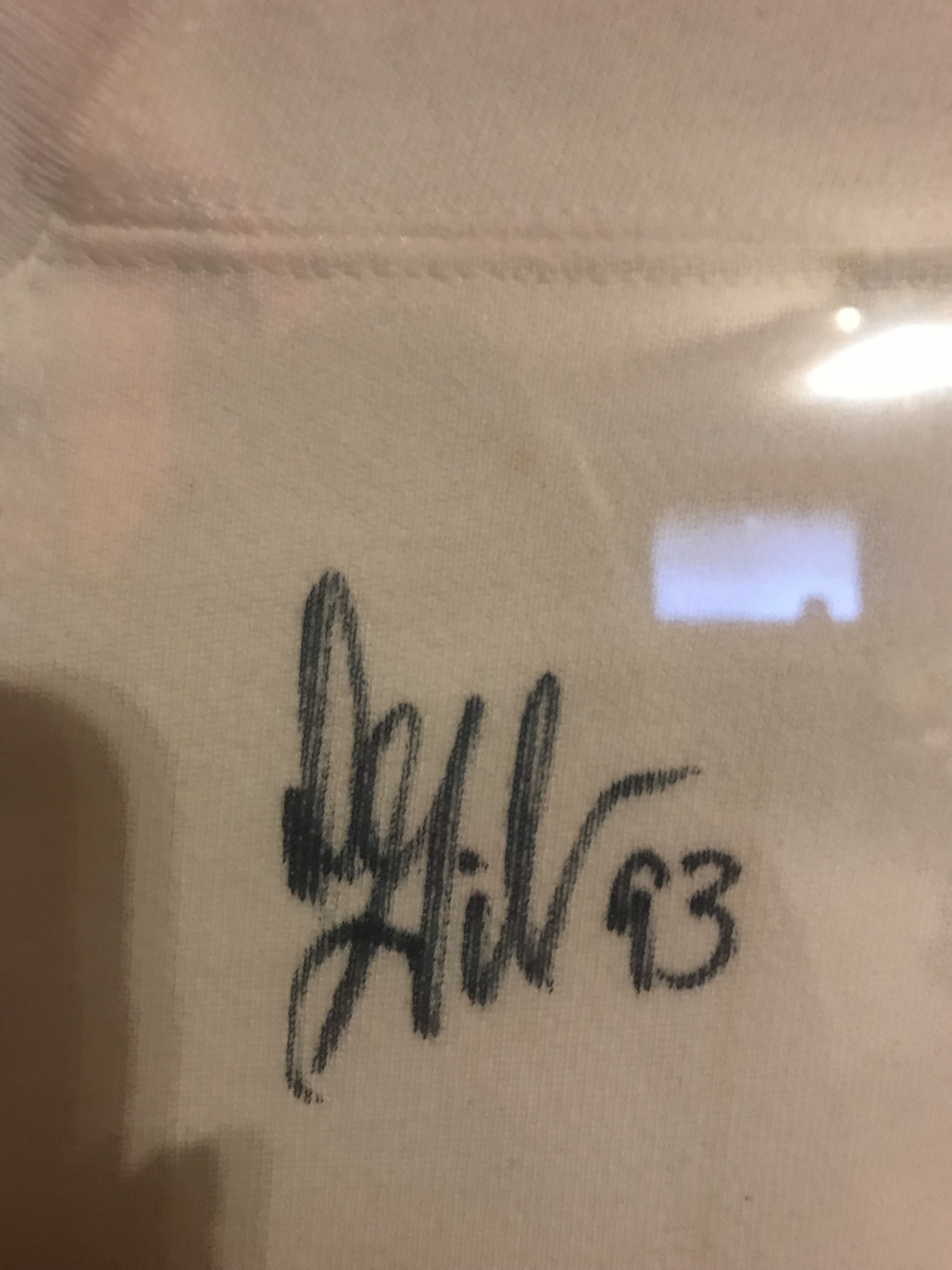
Doug Gilmour's signature and his uniform number 93 (on a t-shirt)

Douglas Robert Gilmour (born June 25, 1963) is a Canadian former professional ice hockey player. He played 20 seasons in the National Hockey League (NHL) for seven different teams. Gilmour was a seventh round selection, 134th overall, of the St. Louis Blues at the 1982 NHL entry draft and recorded 1,414 points in 1,474 games in the NHL between 1983 and 2003. A two-time All-Star, he was a member of Calgary's 1989 Stanley Cup championship team and won the Frank J. Selke Trophy as the NHL's best defensive forward in 1992–93. Internationally, he represented Canada three times during his career and was a member of the nation's 1987 Canada Cup championship team.

Gilmour was nicknamed "Killer" by a Blues teammate possibly due to his having the same last name as serial killer Gary Gilmore (though others have attributed it to his physical style of play despite his small stature). He played three seasons of junior hockey for the Cornwall Royals where he was a member of their Memorial Cup championship team in 1981. In 1982–83, Gilmour was named the most outstanding player in the Ontario Hockey League (OHL) after he scored 177 points, one of the highest totals in league history. Gilmour returned to the OHL following his playing career as he joined the Kingston Frontenacs as head coach in 2008 and was promoted to general manager in 2011. Gilmour was inducted into the Hockey Hall of Fame and the Ontario Sports Hall of Fame in 2011 and his uniform number 93 is retired by the Toronto Maple Leafs.

== Early life ==
Doug Gilmour was born June 25, 1963, in Kingston, Ontario. He is the younger son of Don and Dolly Gilmour, and has an elder brother, David. Don was a correctional officer who worked at the Kingston Penitentiary for over three decades. He also coached youth baseball and hockey teams in the city. As a youth, Doug looked up to David, who was a professional hockey player drafted by the Vancouver Canucks but never played in the National Hockey League (NHL). The younger Gilmour played in the 1976 Quebec International Pee-Wee Hockey Tournament with a minor ice hockey team from Kingston.

Gilmour's small size – he stood five feet, nine inches tall and weighed 140 pounds in junior hockey – resulted in his being cut from several teams throughout his minor hockey career. Originally a defenceman, Gilmour began his 16-year-old season (1979–80) in Junior B with his hometown Kingston Voyageurs. Given only three minutes of ice time per game, he asked the team for his release so that he could return to Major Midget hockey where he would get more ice time. Instead, he was offered a spot with the Junior A Belleville Bulls, with whom he began as a defenceman but shifted to left wing during the playoffs due to injuries.

== Playing career ==
=== Junior ===
The Cornwall Royals of the major junior Quebec Major Junior Hockey League (QMJHL) drafted Gilmour from Belleville, and he joined the team for the 1980–81 season. The Royals were the defending Memorial Cup champions, and Gilmour was not expected to play a significant role with the team. The Royals started him off as an offensive defenceman, but moved him to forward permanently. As national champions, the Royals represented Canada at the 1981 World Junior Ice Hockey Championships. Gilmour appeared in all five tournament games, though he scored no points, as the team struggled to a seventh-place finish in the eight team tournament. In the QMJHL, Gilmour's season was interrupted by a broken collarbone. He finished the year with 35 points in 51 games. The Royals won the QMJHL championship and earned a berth in the 1981 Memorial Cup. Gilmour recorded seven points in five games at the tournament. Cornwall faced the Ontario Hockey League (OHL)'s Kitchener Rangers in the championship game. Cornwall won 5–2 to repeat as national champions; Gilmour scored the winning goal midway through the second period.

Though eligible for the 1981 NHL entry draft, Gilmour went unselected and returned to Cornwall, who had shifted to the OHL for the 1981–82 season. He played a more significant role with the Royals and led the team offensively; Gilmour's 119 points in 67 games was sixth best in the league. NHL teams continued to dismiss Gilmour due to his size, but the St. Louis Blues gambled on him in the 1982 NHL entry draft by selecting him with their seventh round pick, 134th overall. The Blues returned him to Cornwall for the 1982–83 season where he led the OHL in goals (70), assists (107) and points (177). Gilmour won the Eddie Powers Memorial Trophy as the leading scorer, was named a league all-star, and was named recipient of the Red Tilson Trophy as the OHL's most outstanding player. His season total of 177 points is the third highest in OHL history, behind Bobby Smith (192) and Wayne Gretzky (182). Gilmour had a 55-game point streak that lasted from October 19, 1982, until February 27, 1983, and which remains an OHL record.

=== St. Louis Blues ===
Despite his performance in Cornwall, the Blues did not make signing Gilmour a priority. Unsure if a contract offer would materialize, Gilmour made plans to play in Düsseldorf, West Germany, and had already traveled to Europe when the Blues finally offered him a deal in mid-August 1983. St. Louis coach Jacques Demers believed Gilmour had the potential to be a defensive specialist at forward. He began the 1983–84 season in St. Louis and made his NHL debut on October 4, 1983, against the Pittsburgh Penguins. Gilmour scored his first goal on November 1, in his 12th game, against Eddie Mio of the Detroit Red Wings. He finished the season with 25 goals and 53 points. Teammate Brian Sutter began calling Gilmour "Charlie", after Charles Manson, in reference to both his "mean" style of play and an apparent resemblance to the serial killer; it morphed into "Killer", a nickname Gilmour retained throughout his career.

Gilmour's offensive performances were consistent in his following two seasons. He recorded 57 points in 1984–85 and 53 points in 1985–86. Defensively, Demers matched Gilmour up at centre against the opposition's best players and he played an agitator role. Over time, he gained confidence in his ability to both defend against the opposition and play an offensive role. Gilmour established a role as a top offensive scorer for the Blues in the 1986 Stanley Cup playoffs as he recorded 21 points in 19 games. He tied with teammate Bernie Federko for the league lead in playoff scoring, despite the fact that the Blues failed to reach the Stanley Cup Final. The Blues were eliminated in the Campbell Conference Final by the Calgary Flames. His offensive breakout continuing into the 1986–87 season, Gilmour led the Blues and finished fifth overall in NHL scoring with 105 points; his 42 goals was the highest single-season total of his career. His performance in the NHL season earned Gilmour an invitation to join Team Canada at the 1987 Canada Cup. He had two goals in the tournament as Canada won the championship.

An 86-point season followed in 1987–88. Gilmour was part of history in a December 19, 1987, game against the Boston Bruins, a 7–5 victory. Two seconds after Ken Linseman scored for Boston, Gilmour replied for St. Louis as the pair combined to set a record for the fastest two goals in league history.

Gilmour became embroiled in a legal conflict. He was sued in August 1988 by the parents of a 14-year-old girl who alleged that Gilmour had sexually assaulted their daughter. His wife Robyne, the Blues organization and the team's president Jack Quinn were also named in the $1 million lawsuit as it was alleged that they "knew or should have known" about the alleged abuse. The Blues were also accused of pretending to negotiate a payment while attempting to trade Gilmour without informing the other team of the allegations. One week later, on September 6, the Blues traded Gilmour to the Flames in a multi-player deal. Gilmour, Mark Hunter, Steve Bozek and Michael Dark were sent to Calgary in exchange for Mike Bullard, Craig Coxe, and Tim Corkery. Bozek, however, was traded to the Vancouver Canucks that same day. Gilmour expressed disappointment at leaving the Blues, but stated that "from what has happened the past week, on our part and on the St. Louis Blues' part, it was our best solution."

=== Calgary Flames ===
Gilmour's legal situation progressed throughout the early part of the 1988–89 NHL season as he began his career with the Flames: He and his wife countersued his accusers for slander and libel in October, and a grand jury was convened to investigate whether criminal charges were warranted. Gilmour denied the allegations and by the end of the year, the grand jury chose not to indict Gilmour. The lawsuit was dropped shortly after, and Gilmour stated that he was moving on from the ordeal.

On the ice, Gilmour tied with Håkan Loob for second in team scoring with 85 points, behind Joe Mullen's 110 as the Flames won the Presidents' Trophy as the top regular season team in the NHL. Gilmour played a pivotal role in the Flames' run to the 1989 Stanley Cup Final; he was particularly effective in Calgary's second round series against the Los Angeles Kings where he scored or assisted on key goals in three of the four games while playing an effective role in preventing the Kings' star Wayne Gretzky from establishing his own offensive game. Gilmour recorded 11 goals and 11 assists in 22 games during the Flames' playoff run. In the sixth game of the final, against the Montreal Canadiens, he scored two goals – including the championship winning tally – in a 4–2 victory that clinched the Flames first Stanley Cup.

Early in the 1989–90 season, Gilmour was again part of goal-scoring history. He scored a shorthanded goal with 15 seconds remaining in regulation time, followed four seconds later by teammate Paul Ranheim. The two goals salvaged an 8–8 tie in the October 17, 1989, contest against the Quebec Nordiques. It tied an NHL record for fastest two goals by one team (since broken), and remains the record for fastest two shorthanded goals. He completed the season as the team's leader in assists with 67, and second in points at 91. The Flames named Gilmour one of the team's captains for the 1990–91 season, a year in which he surpassed 600 games and 600 points for his career. He also became embroiled in a physical melee with Los Angeles Kings assistant coach Tom Webster late in the season. An argument between the two teams escalated into a physical altercation; Gilmour was suspended two games for shoving Webster, while the coach received four for punching Gilmour.

An off-season salary dispute with Flames' general manager Doug Risebrough carried into the 1991–92 season. Gilmour, who was playing the option year of his contract at a salary of US$450,000 was unable to reach a deal with the team on an extension. The dispute went to arbitration where the Flames offered a raise to $550,000 while he asked for $1.2 million and was expecting a settlement worth around $800,000. The arbitrator's decision, made in December 1991, amounted to $750,000 per season for two years, but left Gilmour angry and bitter. He alleged that executives with the team and league had tampered with the process – the arbitrator attended a Flames game with team management on the night before the hearing, while NHL President John Ziegler sent a letter to the arbitrators. Gilmour, who remained active with the Flames throughout the process, had scored 38 points in 38 games. Following the decision, he requested a trade out of Calgary and threatened legal action. Gilmour led the Flames to a 3–2 overtime victory over the Montreal Canadiens with a goal and an assist on New Year's Eve then walked out on the club on January 1, 1992. He later called the choice to walk away from the team to be one of the toughest decisions he had ever made.

The following day, Calgary dealt Gilmour to the Toronto Maple Leafs as part of a ten player swap, the largest trade in NHL history. Calgary sent Gilmour, Jamie Macoun, Ric Nattress, Kent Manderville and Rick Wamsley to Toronto in exchange for Gary Leeman, Craig Berube, Michel Petit, Alexander Godynyuk and Jeff Reese. The deal altered the trajectory of both franchises as Gilmour immediately revitalized the Maple Leafs while the Flames franchise entered a long decline after the deal that was immediately judged to have ended in Toronto's favour.

=== Toronto Maple Leafs ===
Within a month of the trade, Gilmour and the Maple Leafs agreed to a new contract that was reported to be worth $4 million over four years. With only 30 wins in 80 games, Toronto was one of the worst teams in the NHL in 1991–92, however recorded 20 of those victories in the second half of the season following the trade. Gilmour scored 49 points for Toronto, and finished the year with 87 points combined between the Flames and Maple Leafs. Upon joining the Maple Leafs, Gilmour switched his number from #39 to #93 which he would wear for the rest of his career.

In his first full season with the Maple Leafs, 1992–93, Gilmour had the finest season of his career. He broke Toronto franchise records for assists (95) and points (127), and on February 13, 1993, tied Babe Pratt's franchise record by assisting on six goals in one game. Gilmour finished seventh overall in NHL scoring, but was also subject to a controversial suspension during the year. The league suspended Gilmour for eight practice days – but no games – after he broke Tomas Sandström's forearm with a slash. The Maple Leafs finished the season with the eighth-best record in the NHL, and posted their first winning season since 1978–79.

In the 1993 Stanley Cup Playoffs, Gilmour broke the team scoring record by scoring 35 points as Toronto reached the Campbell Conference Final. The sixth game of the series, against the Los Angeles Kings, ended in controversy. Toronto led the series three games to two and one additional victory would have put the Maple Leafs into the Stanley Cup Final for the first time since 1967. In the first minute of overtime with the score tied 4–4, Gilmour was cut on his chin for eight stitches after he was struck by Wayne Gretzky's stick. League rules of the time mandated that player who caused an injury via a high-sticking infraction be assessed a five-minute penalty, however referee Kerry Fraser made no call on the play, even after conferring with his linesmen. Instead, Gretzky remained on the ice and scored the game-winning goal seconds later. Gretzky then led Los Angeles to a game seven victory that eliminated Toronto from the playoffs. Toronto fans remain bitter about the non-call two decades after the fact, while Fraser – who explained he did not have a clear view of the play – admitted it was the worst mistake he made in over 2,100 games as an NHL referee.

Individually, Gilmour earned several accolades for his season: He played in the 1993 All-Star Game (his first of two consecutive appearances), was named recipient of the Frank J. Selke Trophy as the NHL's top defensive forward, and finished second to Mario Lemieux in voting for the Hart Memorial Trophy as the league's most valuable player. The Maple Leafs agreed to renegotiate Gilmour's contract following the season; the two sides agreed to a five-year, $15 million contract early in the 1993–94 season that included endorsement rights and was expected to allow Gilmour to complete his career in Toronto.

Gilmour recorded his third career 100-point season in 1993–94 as he finished fourth in NHL scoring with 111 points. During the season, Gilmour briefly required police protection after receiving death threats from an unidentified woman. He finished fourth in post-season scoring with 28 points as the Maple Leafs again reached the Western Conference Final before losing to the Vancouver Canucks. Gilmour finished fourth in Hart Trophy voting and second in Selke trophy voting.

The Maple Leafs named Gilmour the 15th captain in franchise history on August 18, 1994, as he succeeded Wendel Clark, who was traded to the Quebec Nordiques in the off-season. The 1994–95 season was delayed by a labour dispute. The stoppage prompted several players to sign temporarily with European teams. Gilmour signed in Switzerland and joined the Rapperswil-Jona Lakers in November 1994. He appeared in nine games with the National League A team and scored two goals to go along with 13 assists before returning to Canada. He also attempted to join Wayne Gretzky's Ninety Nine All Stars Tour of Europe when able. Gilmour returned to the Maple Leafs when the NHL's dispute was resolved; in 44 games with Toronto, he had 10 goals and 23 assists.

Gilmour reached a career milestone during the 1995–96 season as he scored his 1,000th career point on December 23, 1995, in a 6–1 victory over Edmonton.

Gilmour was one of the most popular players on the Leafs during his tenure. He was a spokesman for the NHLPA in community and charity events, and also appeared in a series of "Got Milk?" TV commercials, one which featured his then wife Amy.

=== Later career ===
With the Leafs struggling once again, Cliff Fletcher traded Gilmour and defenseman Dave Ellett to the New Jersey Devils in 1997 for centreman Steve Sullivan, prospect Alyn McCauley and defenseman Jason Smith. The Devils during Gilmour's tenure would then suffer early playoff exits.

In the summer of 1998, Doug Gilmour signed as a free agent with the Chicago Blackhawks. Chicago had fallen on hard times and Gilmour was brought in to help resurrect the franchise. Chicago was situated at the bottom half of the standings during Gilmour's tenure, ultimately culminating with captain Chris Chelios requesting a trade to the Detroit Red Wings, and Gilmour assuming the team captaincy the following season.

Gilmour's Blackhawks played against the Toronto Maple Leafs on February 13, 1999, as the last game in historic Maple Leaf Gardens was played. Gilmour scored in the game and was given a standing ovation by the Toronto fans during the Gardens' closing ceremonies. Gilmour suffered a back injury (herniated disk) late in the season and had to undergo season-ending surgery.

In the spring of 2000, with the Blackhawks once again floundering among the bottom of the NHL, Gilmour was traded to the Buffalo Sabres along with left winger J.P. Dumont for forward Michal Grošek. Gilmour helped the Sabres, which had been Stanley Cup finalists the season before, make the playoffs. However the Sabres were defeated in five games by the Philadelphia Flyers.

In 2000–01, injuries limited Gilmour's regular season stats but had respectable playoff performance as the Sabres defeated the Philadelphia Flyers in the Quarterfinal Round of the NHL playoffs. The Sabres were subsequently upset 4 games to 3 by the Pittsburgh Penguins in the second round.

After what The Globe and Mail called an 'unhappy season' with the Sabres, Gilmour contemplated retirement, but as the start of the season approached, was rumored to be signing with the Ottawa Senators. Ultimately, one day after the contract leaked online, on October 6, 2001, Gilmor signed a one-year, $1.8 million (not including incentives) contract with the Montreal Canadiens, with a club option for a second year at $2 million. Montreal was looking to bolster centre-depth, being considered weak at the position following the cancer diagnosis of Saku Koivu. The Canadiens would make the playoffs that season, eventually being beaten by the Carolina Hurricanes.

Following his first year with Montreal, which saw the centre record 41 points, Gilmour resigned with the Canadiens to a one-year contract with an option for the 2003–04 season on August 9, 2002. The Canadiens would trade Gilmour to the playoff bound Maple Leafs for a sixth-round draft pick at the 2003 NHL trade deadline. Gilmour's first game with the Leafs turned out to be his last as he and the Calgary Flames Dave Lowry collided inadvertently during Gilmour's second shift, with Gilmour tearing his ACL and missing the remainder of the season. At 40 years old, Gilmour officially announced his retirement on September 8, 2003, still facing possibly months of rehabilitation for his spring ACL tear and after new Maple Leafs general manager John Ferguson Jr. made a public announcement that the Maple Leafs would not re-sign the veteran centre.

Gilmour scored 450 goals and 964 assists in 1474 games in his NHL career.

On January 31, 2009, Gilmour's number 93 was honoured by the Toronto Maple Leafs as it was raised to the rafters at Air Canada Centre. Gilmour became the seventeenth player to be honoured in such a way by the Maple Leafs. He was inducted into the Hockey Hall of Fame in 2011. On October 15, 2016, Gilmour's number 93 was retired by the Maple Leafs, along with all other honoured numbers also being retired.

== Coaching career ==
=== Toronto Maple Leafs/Toronto Marlies (AHL) ===
On September 15, 2006, the Toronto Maple Leafs announced that Gilmour would become their player development advisor. Gilmour held that position with the Leafs until August 7, 2008, when the Maple Leafs announced that Gilmour would join the Toronto Marlies, the Leafs American Hockey League affiliate, as an assistant coach under Marlies head coach Greg Gilbert. Gilmour held that position for only a few months before leaving the Maple Leafs' organization to become the head coach of the Kingston Frontenacs of the OHL in November 2008.

=== Kingston Frontenacs ===
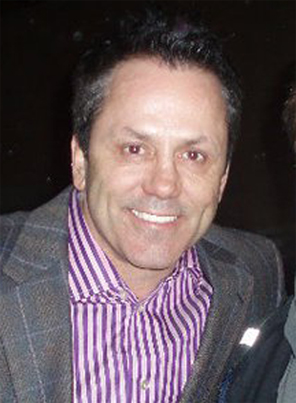
Gilmour (while head coach of the Frontenacs) after a regular season game in Oshawa

Gilmour was named head coach of the Kingston Frontenacs on November 17, 2008, taking over a rebuilding club that had a 5–13–5 record under Larry Mavety, who had coached Gilmour with the Belleville Bulls when the Bulls were still in the OPJHL. Gilmour finished out the season with Kingston with a 13–27–5 record in their last 45 games and the team failed to make the playoffs.

In his first full season with the club in 2009–10, Gilmour helped guide the team back into the OHL playoffs, as Kingston recorded a 33–30–5 record, earning 71 points, good enough for second place in the OHL's East Division, and fourth place in the OHL's Eastern Conference. The Frontenacs faced the Brampton Battalion in the first round of the playoffs, which Brampton won in seven games. After the season, Gilmour signed to a five-year contract extension with the Frontenacs.

In 2010–11, the Frontenacs slipped under the .500 level during the regular season, going 29–30–9, earning 67 points, but still made the playoffs. In their first round match up against the Oshawa Generals, Kingston struggled and the Generals eliminated them in five games. At the conclusion of the season, Gilmour left the Frontenacs' head coaching position to become the team's general manager, replacing good friend Larry Mavety, who became an advisor to the club. Former Maple Leafs teammate Todd Gill was selected to replace Gilmour behind the Frontenacs bench.

As general manager of the Frontenacs, Gilmour began to rebuild the club, as the club struggled to a 19–41–8 record during the 2011–12 season, finishing in last place in the Eastern Conference, well out of a playoff spot. Kingston saw some improvement during the 2012–13 season, as the team finished with a 27–35–6 record, earning 60 points, good for seventh place in the conference, and a playoff spot. The Frontenacs were swept in the first round against the Barrie Colts. The Frontenacs improved once again in the 2013–14 season, earning a record of 39–23–6, getting 84 points, and third place in the Eastern Conference. Kingston met the Peterborough Petes in the first round of the playoffs, and the team took a 3–0 lead in the best-of-seven series. The Petes made a comeback, winning the final four games of the series, to eliminate the Frontenacs.

He stepped down as general manager and became the president of the Frontenacs in 2017. In 2019, he left the team to become a community representative for the Maple Leafs.

== Personal life ==
Gilmour has been married three times and has four children. His daughter Maddison (now married to hockey player Evan McGrath) is from his first marriage to Robyne Gilmour; sons Jake and Tyson from his second marriage to Amy Gilmour; and daughter Victoria with his current wife, Sonya Gilmour.

== Career statistics ==
=== Regular season and playoffs ===
			Regular season					Playoffs
Season	Team	League	GP	G	A	Pts	PIM	GP	G	A	Pts	PIM
1980–81	Cornwall Royals	QMJHL	51	12	23	35	35	19	8	13	21	6
1981–82	Cornwall Royals	OHL	67	46	73	119	42	5	6	9	15	2
1982–83	Cornwall Royals	OHL	68	70	107	177	62	8	8	10	18	16
1983–84	St. Louis Blues	NHL	80	25	28	53	57	11	2	9	11	10
1984–85	St. Louis Blues	NHL	78	21	36	57	49	3	1	1	2	2
1985–86	St. Louis Blues	NHL	74	25	28	53	41	19	9	12	21	25
1986–87	St. Louis Blues	NHL	80	42	63	105	58	6	2	2	4	16
1987–88	St. Louis Blues	NHL	72	36	50	86	59	10	3	14	17	18
1988–89	Calgary Flames	NHL	72	26	59	85	44	22	11	11	22	20
1989–90	Calgary Flames	NHL	78	24	67	91	54	6	3	1	4	8
1990–91	Calgary Flames	NHL	78	20	61	81	144	7	1	1	2	0
1991–92	Calgary Flames	NHL	38	11	27	38	46	—	—	—	—	—
1991–92	Toronto Maple Leafs	NHL	40	15	34	49	32	—	—	—	—	—
1992–93	Toronto Maple Leafs	NHL	83	32	95	127	100	21	10	25	35	30
1993–94	Toronto Maple Leafs	NHL	83	27	84	111	105	18	6	22	28	42
1994–95	Rapperswil-Jona Lakers	NDA	9	2	13	15	16	—	—	—	—	—
1994–95	Toronto Maple Leafs	NHL	44	10	23	33	26	7	0	6	6	6
1995–96	Toronto Maple Leafs	NHL	81	32	40	72	77	6	1	7	8	12
1996–97	Toronto Maple Leafs	NHL	61	15	45	60	46	—	—	—	—	—
1996–97	New Jersey Devils	NHL	20	7	15	22	22	10	0	4	4	14
1997–98	New Jersey Devils	NHL	63	13	40	53	68	6	5	2	7	4
1998–99	Chicago Blackhawks	NHL	72	16	40	56	56	—	—	—	—	—
1999–00	Chicago Blackhawks	NHL	63	22	34	56	51	—	—	—	—	—
1999–00	Buffalo Sabres	NHL	11	3	14	17	12	5	0	1	1	0
2000–01	Buffalo Sabres	NHL	71	7	31	38	70	13	2	4	6	12
2001–02	Montreal Canadiens	NHL	70	10	31	41	48	12	4	6	10	16
2002–03	Montreal Canadiens	NHL	61	11	19	30	36	—	—	—	—	—
2002–03	Toronto Maple Leafs	NHL	1	0	0	0	0	—	—	—	—	—
NHL totals			1,474	450	964	1,414	1,301	182	60	128	188	235

=== International ===
Year	Team	Event	GP	G	A	P	PIM
1981	Canada	WJC	5	0	0	0	0
1987	Canada	CC	8	2	0	2	4
1990	Canada	WC	9	1	4	5	18
Junior totals			5	0	0	0	0
Senior totals			17	3	4	7	22

== Coaching record ==
Team	Year	Regular Season						Post Season
Team	Year	G	W	L	OTL	Pts	Finish	Result
Kingston Frontenacs	2008–09	45	13	27	5	31	5th in East	Missed playoffs
Kingston Frontenacs	2009–10	68	33	30	5	71	2nd in East	Lost in conference quarter-finals (3-4 vs. BRA)
Kingston Frontenacs	2010–11	68	29	30	9	67	3rd in East	Lost in conference quarter-finals (1-4 vs. OSH)
OHL totals	2008–2011	181	75	87	19	169		4-8 (0.333)

== Awards and honours ==
Ontario Hockey League
Award	Year	Ref.
Memorial Cup champion	1981	
Red Tilson Trophy; Most outstanding player	1983	
Eddie Powers Memorial Trophy; Leading scorer	1983	
First team All-Star	1983	

National Hockey League
Award	Year	Ref.
Stanley Cup champion	1989	
Frank J. Selke Trophy	1993	
NHL All-Star Game	1993, 1994	

- Inducted into the Hockey Hall of Fame in 2011.

== Records ==
Career
Record	Total	Ref.
Sarnia (OHL) (formerly Cornwall Royals) franchise record most assists, single season	107, 1982–83	
Sarnia (OHL) franchise record most points, single season	177, 1982–83	
OHL record, longest consecutive point streak	55 games, October 19, 1982 – February 27, 1983	
Toronto franchise record most assists, single season	95, 1992–93	
Toronto franchise record most points, single season	127, 1992–93	
Toronto franchise record most assists, single game	6, February 13, 1993 (Shared with Babe Pratt, January 18, 1944)	
NHL record fastest two goals, both teams	2 seconds, December 19, 1987 (Ken Linseman, BOS, 19:50; Gilmour, STL, 19:52)	

== See also ==
- List of NHL statistical leaders

Preceded by Wendel Clark	Toronto Maple Leafs captain 1994–97	Succeeded by Mats Sundin
Preceded by Chris Chelios	Chicago Blackhawks captain 1999–2000	Succeeded by Tony Amonte
Preceded by Guy Carbonneau	Winner of the Frank J. Selke Trophy; 1993	Succeeded by Sergei Fedorov
Preceded by Larry Mavety	Head Coach of the Kingston Frontenacs; 2008–11	Succeeded by Todd Gill
