= Tim Bernhardt =

Canadian ice hockey player (born 1958)

- Born: January 17, 1958 (age 68) Sarnia, Ontario, Canada
- Height: 5 ft 9 in (175 cm)
- Weight: 160 lb (73 kg; 11 st 6 lb)
- Position: Goaltender
- Caught: Left
- Played for: Calgary Flames; Toronto Maple Leafs
- NHL draft: 47th overall, 1978; Atlanta Flames
- Playing career: 1978–1990

Timothy John Bernhardt (born January 17, 1958) is a Canadian retired professional ice hockey goaltender who played 67 games in the National Hockey League with the Toronto Maple Leafs and Calgary Flames between 1982 and 1986.

== Playing career ==
Bernhardt began his career with the Sarnia Junior Bees in 1974 and then with the Cornwall Royals of the Quebec Major Junior Hockey League from 1975 to 1978. From 1978 to 1983 he played for several CHL teams (Tulsa Oilers, Birmingham Bulls, Oklahoma City Stars and the Colorado Flames). Before joining Calgary, Bernhardt played with the Rochester Americans of the American Hockey League. Bernhardt played for Canada during the World Junior Championships in 1977–1978.

From 1983 to 1990, Bernhardt split his time between the Toronto Maple Leafs and the AHL farm clubs, the St. Catharines Saints and Newmarket Saints.

== Post-playing career ==
After retirement, he worked as a scout for the Dallas Stars until 2011. He was a key person in the Stars organization as he was responsible for drafting players such as Steve Ott, Mike Smith, Jussi Jokinen, Trevor Daley, Loui Eriksson, James Neal, Matt Niskanen and Jamie Benn. Bernhardt served as the director of amateur scouting for the Arizona Coyotes until 2018.

== Career statistics ==
=== Regular season and playoffs ===
			Regular season									Playoffs
Season	Team	League	GP	W	L	T	MIN	GA	SO	GAA	SV%	GP	W	L	T	MIN	GA	SO	GAA	SV%
1975–76	Cornwall Royals	QMJHL	51	24	16	9	2985	195	2	3.92	.876	8	4	4	0	488	30	0	3.69	.878
1976–77	Cornwall Royals	QMJHL	44	24	12	6	2497	151	0	3.63	.888	12	4	5	3	720	47	0	3.92	.885
1977–78	Cornwall Royals	QMJHL	54	35	13	5	3165	179	2	3.39	.893	9	5	4	0	540	27	2	3.00	.900
1978–79	Tulsa Oilers	CHL	46	15	26	3	2705	191	0	4.24	.880	—	—	—	—	—	—	—	—	—
1979–80	Birmingham Bulls	CHL	34	15	16	1	1933	122	1	3.79	.888	3	1	2	—	160	17	0	6.38	—
1980–81	Birmingham Bulls	CHL	29	11	13	2	1598	106	1	3.98	.879	—	—	—	—	—	—	—	—	—
1981–82	Oklahoma City Stars	CHL	10	1	8	0	526	45	0	5.13	.836	—	—	—	—	—	—	—	—	—
1981–82	Rochester Americans	AHL	29	15	10	2	1586	95	0	3.59	—	9	4	3	—	527	29	0	3.30	—
1982–83	Calgary Flames	NHL	6	0	5	0	280	21	0	4.50	.857	—	—	—	—	—	—	—	—	—
1982–83	Colorado Flames	CHL	34	19	11	1	1896	122	0	3.86	.881	5	2	3	—	304	19	0	3.75	—
1983–84	St. Catharines Saints	AHL	42	25	13	4	2501	154	0	3.69	—	5	2	3	—	288	17	0	3.54	—
1984–85	Toronto Maple Leafs	NHL	37	13	19	4	2175	136	0	3.75	.878	—	—	—	—	—	—	—	—	—
1984–85	St. Catharines Saints	AHL	14	5	7	2	801	55	0	4.12	.860	—	—	—	—	—	—	—	—	—
1985–86	Toronto Maple Leafs	NHL	23	4	12	3	1261	107	0	5.09	.853	—	—	—	—	—	—	—	—	—
1985–86	St. Catharines Saints	AHL	14	6	4	2	776	38	1	2.94	.890	3	0	3	—	140	12	0	5.14	—
1986–87	Toronto Maple Leafs	NHL	1	0	0	0	20	3	0	9.00	.571	—	—	—	—	—	—	—	—	—
1986–87	Newmarket Saints	AHL	31	6	17	0	1705	117	1	4.12	.877	—	—	—	—	—	—	—	—	—
1987–88	Newmarket Saints	AHL	49	22	19	4	2704	166	0	3.68	.884	—	—	—	—	—	—	—	—	—
1988–89	Newmarket Saints	AHL	37	17	16	2	2004	145	1	4.34	.876	—	—	—	—	—	—	—	—	—
1989–90	Newmarket Saints	AHL	14	4	7	1	755	51	0	4.71	.871	—	—	—	—	—	—	—	—	—
AHL totals			230	100	93	17	12,832	821	3	3.84	—	17	6	9	—	955	58	0	3.64	—
NHL totals			67	17	36	7	3736	267	0	4.29	.866	—	—	—	—	—	—	—	—	—

=== International ===
Year	Team	Event	GP	W	L	T	MIN	GA	SO	GAA	SV%
1978	Canada	WJC	3	2	1	0	180	6	0	2.00	—
Junior totals			3	2	1	0	180	6	0	2.00	—
