= Rick LaFerriere =

Canadian ice hockey player

- Born: January 3, 1961 (age 65) Hawkesbury, Ontario, Canada
- Height: 5 ft 8 in (173 cm)
- Weight: 165 lb (75 kg; 11 st 11 lb)
- Position: Goaltender
- Caught: Left
- Played for: Colorado Rockies
- NHL draft: 64th overall, 1980; Colorado Rockies
- Playing career: 1981–1984

Richard Jacques LaFerrière (born January 3, 1961) is a Canadian former professional ice hockey goaltender. His only NHL appearance came on February 23, 1982 when he was called in to relieve Chico Resch of goaltending duties at start of the third period in a game against the Detroit Red Wings.

LaFerrière was member of the Tulsa Oilers (CHL) team that suspended operations on February 16, 1984, playing only road games for final six weeks of 1983-84 season. Despite this adversity, the team went on to win the league's championship.

After retiring from professional hockey, he went into the real estate business, and joined Chay Realty RE/MAX office in Barrie, Ontario.

== Playing career ==
LaFerrière was born in Hawkesbury, Ontario. LaFerrière played four seasons (1978–1981) in the Ontario Hockey League with the Peterborough Petes and the Brantford Alexanders. LaFerrière was drafted in the fourth round, 64th overall, of the 1980 NHL entry draft by the Colorado Rockies.

LaFerrière began his professional career in the CHL with the Fort Worth Texans, gaining 8 wins in 37 games played during the 1981-82 season. He played in one NHL game during the 1981–82 NHL season. He played two seasons in the IHL with the Muskegon Mohawks, before concluding his playing career in the CHL with the Tulsa Oilers who he joined at the end of the 1983-84 season.

In the 1983-84 playoffs, LaFerrière played in one game, supporting his team's win of the CHL Championship and the Adams Cup.

== Career statistics ==
=== Regular season and playoffs ===
			Regular season									Playoffs
Season	Team	League	GP	W	L	T	MIN	GA	SO	GAA	SV%	GP	W	L	MIN	GA	SO	GAA	SV%
1978–79	Peterborough Pets	OMJHL	21	—	—	—	1279	76	1	3.56	—	—	—	—	—	—	—	—	—
1979–80	Peterborough Pets	OMJHL	55	38	13	1	3118	170	2	3.27	.893	14	12	—	863	38	0	2.64	—
1979–80	Peterborough Petes	M-Cup	—	—	—	—	—	—	—	—	—	5	3	2	305	21	0	4.13	—
1980–81	Peterborough Pets	OHL	34	15	15	2	1959	144	0	4.41	—	—	—	—	—	—	—	—	—
1980–81	Brantford Alexanders	OHL	20	11	8	0	1155	93	0	4.83	—	—	—	—	—	—	—	—	—
1981–82	Fort Worth Texans	CHL	37	8	26	2	2155	189	1	5.26	.841	—	—	—	—	—	—	—	—
1981–82	Colorado Rockies	NHL	1	0	0	0	20	1	0	3.00	.947	—	—	—	—	—	—	—	—
1982–83	Muskegon Mohawks	IHL	44	—	—	—	2578	186	0	4.33	—	2	—	—	120	8	0	4.00	—
1983–84	Muskegon Mohawks	IHL	16	—	—	—	817	83	0	6.09	—	—	—	—	—	—	—	—	—
1983–84	Tulsa Oilers	CHL	2	—	—	—	79	4	0	3.03	—	1	0	0	20	2	0	6.00	—
NHL totals			1	0	0	0	20	1	0	3.00	.947	—	—	—	—	—	—	—	—

=== International ===
Year	Team	Event	GP	W	L	T	MIN	GA	SO	GAA	SV%
1980	Canada	WJC	4	2	2	0	240	13	0	3.25	—
Junior totals			4	2	2	0	240	13	0	3.25	—

== Honours and awards ==
- 1979 Memorial Cup (Peterborough)
- 1979-80 OMJHL All-Star Second Team
- 1979-80 OMJHL Goals-Against Average Leader (3.27 GAA)
- 1979-80 OMJHL Dave Pinkney Trophy (Lowest Team GAA) (co-winner with Terry Wright)
- 1980 World Junior Championships (fifth place)
- 1980 Memorial Cup (Peterborough)
- 1980 Memorial Cup Wins Leader (3 wins)
- 1980 Hap Emms Memorial Trophy (Outstanding Goalie)
- 1980 Memorial Cup All-Star First Team
- 1984 CHL Championship (Adams Cup) as a member of the Tulsa Oilers team coached by Tom Webster.

== See also ==
- List of players who played only one game in the NHL
