= 1980 Memorial Cup =

Canadian junior men's ice hockey championship

Tournament details
- Venue(s): Keystone Centre (Brandon, Manitoba); Agridome (Regina, Saskatchewan)
- Dates: May 4–11, 1980
- Teams: 3

Final positions
- Champions: Cornwall Royals (QMJHL) (2nd title)

The Memorial Cup trophy

The 1980 Memorial Cup occurred May 4–11 at the Keystone Centre in Brandon, Manitoba and at the Agridome in Regina, Saskatchewan. It was the 62nd annual Memorial Cup competition and determined the major junior ice hockey champion of the Canadian Hockey League (CHL). Participating teams were the winners of the Ontario Major Junior Hockey League, Quebec Major Junior Hockey League and Western Hockey League which were the Peterborough Petes, Cornwall Royals and Regina Pats. Cornwall won their second Memorial Cup, defeating Peterborough in the final game.

== Teams ==
QMJHL Team OMJHL Team WHL Team/Host City Host City

=== Cornwall Royals ===
The Cornwall Royals represented the Quebec Major Junior Hockey League at the 1980 Memorial Cup. The Royals finished with the top record in the Lebel Division during the 1979-80 season, posting a record of 41-25-6, earning 88 points, and finishing second overall in points in the league. The Royals offense ranked fifth in the ten team league with 388 goals scored. Their defense ranked fourth as the club allowed 333 goals. In the QMJHL quarter-finals, the Royals held off the Shawinigan Cataractes with a thrilling four games to three series victory. The Royals faced the Chicoutimi Saguenéens in the QMJHL semi-finals, as they won the series four games to one, earning a berth into the league finals. Cornwall's opponent for the President's Cup was top ranked Sherbrooke Castors, and the Royals pulled off the upset, winning the series four games to two and earning a berth into the 1980 Memorial Cup.

Defenseman Dave Ezard led the Royals in scoring, as he scored 40 goals and 105 points in 70 games in his overager season. Sixteen year old rookie standout Dale Hawerchuk also broke the 100 point plateau, as he scored 37 goals and 103 points in 72 games, winning the Michel Bergeron Trophy as QMJHL Rookie of the Year. In the post-season, Hawerchuk broke out with 20 goals and 45 points in 18 games to lead the club, winning the Guy Lafleur Trophy as QMJHL Playoff MVP. Dan Daoust scored 40 goals and 102 points in 70 games. Gilles Crepeau led the Royals with 48 goals, as he added 47 assists for 95 points in 65 games. Mike Corrigan, who scored 30 goals and 71 points in 71 games during the regular season, stepped up his offense in the post-season, scoring 13 goals and 31 points in 18 games. Marc Crawford had a solid season, as he had 27 goals and 63 points in 54 games. In the playoffs, he was third in team scoring with eight goals and 28 points in 18 games. Regular season goaltending duties were split between Tom Graovac, as in 42 games he had a 4.46 GAA and a .857 save percentage, and Ron Scott, as he appeared in 41 games with a 4.75 GAA and a .855 save percentage. In the post-season, Scott emerged as the Royals starting goaltender.

The 1980 Memorial Cup was the second appearance by the Cornwall Royals in team history. The club won the 1972 Memorial Cup in their previous appearance, defeating the Peterborough Petes in the final game.

=== Peterborough Petes ===
The Peterborough Petes represented the Ontario Major Junior Hockey League at the 1980 Memorial Cup. This was the Petes third consecutive appearance at the Memorial Cup. Peterborough was the top team in the OMJHL during the 1979-80 season, earning a record of 47-20-1 for 95 points, and winning the Hamilton Spectator Trophy. The Petes scored 316 goals during the regular season, ranking the club ninth in the twelve team league. Peterborough was the top defensive team in the OMJHL, allowing a league low 238 goals. In the Leyden Division semi-finals, the Petes were forced to a game seven before defeating the Sudbury Wolves four games to three. The Petes had an easier time in the Leyden Division finals, sweeping the Ottawa 67's in four games to advance to the OMJHL finals. In the J. Ross Robertson Cup finals, Peterborough stayed hot and swept the Windsor Spitfires in four games to win their third consecutive OMJHL championship and earn a berth into the 1980 Memorial Cup.

Bill Gardner led the Petes offense, scoring a team high 43 goals and 106 points in 59 games. Defenseman Larry Murphy had a breakout season, scoring 21 goals and 89 points in 68 games to rank second in team scoring. Murphy won the Max Kaminsky Trophy awarded to the Top Defenseman in the OMJHL. Murphy was a top prospect heading into the 1980 NHL entry draft, where he would be drafted fourth overall by the Los Angeles Kings. Mark Reeds had a very solid season, registering 34 goals and 79 points in 54 games. Rick LaFerriere was the Petes starting goaltender, as in 55 games, he earned a 38-13-1 record with a 3.27 GAA and a .893 save percentage. LaFerriere and his back-up, Terry Wright, won the Dave Pinkney Trophy as the goaltenders with the lowest GAA in the league.

The 1980 Memorial Cup was the Petes fifth appearance in team history. At the 1959, 1972 and 1978 Memorial Cups, the Petes lost in the finals. At the 1979 Memorial Cup, Peterborough won the championship for the first time in team history.

=== Regina Pats ===
The Regina Pats represented the Western Hockey League at the 1980 Memorial Cup. The Pats were the top club in the East Division during the 1979-80 season, earning a record of 47-24-1, getting 95 points. Regina had a potent offense, scoring a league high 429 goals. The Pats allowed 311 goals, which ranked them fourth in the WHL in fewest goals allowed. In the post-season, the Pats swept the Lethbridge Broncos in four games in the East Division quarter-finals. In the East Division semi-finals, which was done in a round-robin format, the Pats earned a record of 2-2, good enough to earn a berth into the East Division finals. In the division finals, the Pats defeated the Medicine Hat Tigers four games to one, advancing to the President's Cup finals. In the league finals, the Pats faced the Victoria Cougars, as Regina defeated the Cougars four games to one to win the title and earn a berth into the 1980 Memorial Cup.

The club was led offensively by Doug Wickenheiser, as he led the league with 89 goals and 170 points in 71 games, winning the Bob Clarke Trophy as the top scorer in the WHL. Wickenheiser was also named the Most Valuable Player in the league. In the playoffs, Wickenheiser earned a league high 40 points in 18 games. After the season, Wickenheiser was drafted by the Montreal Canadiens with the first overall selection at the 1980 NHL entry draft. Ron Flockhart scored 54 goals and 130 points, finishing sixth in WHL scoring. Defenseman Darren Veitch scored 29 goals and 122 points in 71 games, ranking him eighth in league scoring and becoming a top prospect for the upcoming 1980 NHL entry draft. Veitch was drafted fifth overall by the Washington Capitals. Brian Varga scored 39 goals and 118 points, ranking him ninth in WHL scoring. Mike Blaisdell was another top prospect on the Pats, as he scored 71 goals and 109 points in 63 games. Blaisdell led Regina with 16 playoff goals. He would be drafted by the Detroit Red Wings with the eleventh overall selection at the 1980 NHL entry draft. The Pats starting goaltender was Bart Hunter, who played in 69 games, earning a record of 45-21-1 with a 4.06 GAA and a .884 save percentage.

The 1980 Memorial Cup was the Pats fourteenth appearance in team history. Regina had won the Memorial Cup four other times, most recently at the 1974 Memorial Cup. Other seasons in which the Pats won were 1925, 1928 and 1930.

== Controversy ==
The 1980 Memorial Cup is remembered as one of the most controversial in the tournament's history. Going into the final game of the round-robin, Peterborough (the defending champs, having won their first Cup in 1979) had clinched first place overall, and, with a win over Cornwall, would have faced Regina in the Cup final.

Many in Saskatchewan believed that the Petes deliberately threw the final game of the round-robin in order to face the Royals (a team that was perceived as weaker, despite having future superstar Dale Hawerchuk) again in the final. In the contest, Peterborough took a 4-1 lead in the second period; Cornwall scored late in the second to cut the lead to 4-2. Confident of victory, the Petes pulled starting goaltender Rick LaFerriere (who made the tournament all-star team and later played in the NHL) and put in his back-up; Cornwall proceeded to storm back with three tallies to take a 5-4 lead. With 1:26 to play, partisan Saskatchewan fans began chanting "throw the game" and "Petes, go home." Soon, the fans began throwing toilet paper, programs, soft drinks and other things at the Petes, causing a fifteen-minute delay and the arrival of some Regina city policemen. The game ended 5-4, thus clinching Cornwall's berth in the Cup final.

The allegations were never proven; Peterborough coach (and future NHL skipper) Mike Keenan hotly denied the rumours, calling them "garbage" whipped up by the media. Even if the Petes did lose on purpose, it quickly backfired on them, as the Royals upended Peterborough on Robert Savard's goal in overtime, 3-2, to take the trophy. The game had been interrupted on sixteen occasions as fans threw eggs—and even a live chicken—on the ice. After Savard's game-winning goal, things got even uglier as the Peterborough bench was pelted with eggs, tomatoes, garbage and debris.

== Round-robin standings ==
Pos	Team	Pld	W	L	GF	GA	
1	Peterborough Petes (OMJHL)	4	3	1	21	18	Advanced to final
2	Cornwall Royals (QMJHL)	4	2	2	18	26	Advanced to final
3	Regina Pats (WHL)	4	1	3	21	16	

== Scores ==
Round-robin

- May 4 Peterborough 5-4 Regina (OT)
- May 5 Cornwall 5-3 Regina
- May 6 Peterborough 8-6 Cornwall
- May 7 Peterborough 4-3 Regina
- May 8 Regina 11-2 Cornwall
- May 9 Cornwall 5-4 Peterborough

Final

- May 11 Cornwall 3-2 Peterborough (OT)

== Winning roster ==
1979-80 Cornwall Royals
Goaltenders: 1 – Tom Graovac; 30 – Ron Scott	Defencemen: 2 – Craig Halliday; 3 – Fred Arthur; 4 – Pat O'Kane; 6 – Dave Ezard; 7 – Robert Savard; 20 – Fred Boimistruck; 21 – Dan Zavarise	Wingers: 8 – Bobby Hull Jr.; 9 – Pat Haramis; 11 – Marc Crawford; 14 – Rod Willard; 17 – Gilles Crepeau; 22 – Scott Arniel; 25 – Dan Brown; 27 – Mike Corrigan	Centres: 5 – Newell Brown; 10 – Dale Hawerchuk; 12 – Dan Daoust - C; Coach: Doug Carpenter; General Manager: Doug Carpenter

== Award winners ==
- Stafford Smythe Memorial Trophy (MVP): Dave Ezard, Cornwall
- George Parsons Trophy (Sportsmanship): Dale Hawerchuk, Cornwall
- Hap Emms Memorial Trophy (Goaltender): Rick LaFerriere, Peterborough

All-star team

- Goal: Rick LaFerriere, Peterborough
- Defence: Darren Veitch, Regina; Larry Murphy, Peterborough
- Centre: Bill Gardner, Peterborough
- Left wing: Dale Hawerchuk, Cornwall
- Right wing: Mark Reeds, Peterborough
