= Eric Calder =

Canadian ice hockey player (born 1963)

- Born: June 26, 1963 (age 62) Kitchener, Ontario, Canada
- Height: 6 ft 2 in (188 cm)
- Weight: 187 lb (85 kg; 13 st 5 lb)
- Position: Defence
- Shot: Right
- Played for: Washington Capitals; Dragons de Rouen; Albatros de Brest; SERC Wild Wings; Manchester Storm
- NHL draft: 45th overall, 1981; Washington Capitals
- Playing career: 1982–1997

Eric Calder (born June 26, 1963) is a Canadian former professional ice hockey defenceman. He played two games in the National Hockey League with the Washington Capitals, one game each in the 1981–82 as an eighteen year old and in 1982–83 seasons as a nineteen year old. The rest of his career, which lasted from 1982 to 1997, was spent in the minor leagues ( AHL, CIAU, and then in Europe. He was selected by the Capitals in the 1981 NHL entry draft.

== Playing career ==
Before playing in the NHL, Calder became one of the youngest players to play for the Canadian junior team, as a 17-year-old, at the 1981 World Junior Ice Hockey Championships, located in Landsberg, Germany. He was one of three Canadians selected as MVP players. He spent three seasons with the Cornwall Royals of the Quebec Major Junior Hockey League, winning the 1981 Memorial Cup as a member of the team. After back to back Memorial Cup Championships Cornwall moved the Ontario Hockey League.

After appearing in his two NHL games, Calder played a season of minor professional hockey with the Hershey Bears of the American Hockey League before returning to school, attending the Wilfrid Laurier University. While at Laurier, he was named an Ontario University Athletic Association all-star in 1986, 1987 and 1988 and a Canadian Interuniversity Athletics Union All-Canadian in 1988. Following graduation, Calder returned to the pro game, playing in France, Germany, and England until retiring as a player in 1998.

== Post-playing career ==
He is currently operating Skills Plus Hockey in Kitchener-Waterloo and Goderich. He last coached a team in 2017, the Waterloo Wolves Midget AAA team that plays in the Minor Hockey Alliance of Ontario.

== Career statistics ==
=== Regular season and playoffs ===
| | | | Regular season | | | | | Playoffs |
| Season | Team | League | GP | G | A | Pts | PIM | GP | G | A | Pts | PIM |
|---|---|---|---|---|---|---|---|---|---|---|---|---|
| 1979–80 | Waterloo Siskins | MWJHL | 42 | 13 | 36 | 49 | 33 | — | — | — | — | — |
| 1980–81 | Waterloo Siskins | MWJHL | 4 | 2 | 0 | 2 | 13 | — | — | — | — | — |
| 1980–81 | Cornwall Royals | QMJHL | 66 | 9 | 34 | 43 | 39 | 14 | 0 | 6 | 6 | 25 |
| 1980–81 | Cornwall Royals | M-Cup | — | — | — | — | — | 5 | 3 | 1 | 4 | 8 |
| 1981–82 | Washington Capitals | NHL | 1 | 0 | 0 | 0 | 0 | — | — | — | — | — |
| 1981–82 | Cornwall Royals | OHL | 65 | 12 | 36 | 48 | 95 | 5 | 1 | 7 | 8 | 6 |
| 1982–83 | Washington Capitals | NHL | 1 | 0 | 0 | 0 | 0 | — | — | — | — | — |
| 1982–83 | Cornwall Royals | OHL | 66 | 5 | 30 | 35 | 72 | 8 | 0 | 5 | 5 | 6 |
| 1983–84 | Fort Wayne Komets | IHL | 3 | 0 | 2 | 2 | 0 | — | — | — | — | — |
| 1983–84 | Hershey Bears | AHL | 68 | 2 | 6 | 8 | 50 | — | — | — | — | — |
| 1985–86 | Wilfrid Laurier University | CIAU | 24 | 5 | 21 | 26 | 41 | — | — | — | — | — |
| 1986–87 | Wilfrid Laurier University | CIAU | 26 | 5 | 26 | 31 | 36 | — | — | — | — | — |
| 1987–88 | Wilfrid Laurier University | CIAU | 26 | 10 | 26 | 36 | 28 | — | — | — | — | — |
| 1988–89 | TSV Peißenberg | GER-3 | 25 | 14 | 27 | 41 | 56 | 12 | 5 | 6 | 11 | 24 |
| 1989–90 | Dragons de Rouen | FRA | 8 | 0 | 4 | 4 | 16 | — | — | — | — | — |
| 1990–91 | Chamonix HC | FRA-2 | 20 | 9 | 6 | 15 | 40 | 2 | 1 | 0 | 1 | 2 |
| 1991–92 | Dragons de Rouen | FRA | 19 | 4 | 5 | 9 | 18 | — | — | — | — | — |
| 1992–93 | Dragons de Rouen | FRA | 33 | 12 | 18 | 30 | 52 | — | — | — | — | — |
| 1993–94 | Dragons de Rouen | FRA | 20 | 7 | 19 | 26 | 16 | 11 | 1 | 7 | 8 | 14 |
| 1994–95 | Albatros de Brest | FRA | 28 | 4 | 6 | 10 | 42 | 9 | 0 | 3 | 3 | 27 |
| 1995–96 | Albatros de Brest | FRA | 28 | 0 | 7 | 7 | 61 | 12 | 3 | 3 | 6 | 36 |
| 1996–97 | SERC Wild Wings | DEL | 4 | 1 | 1 | 2 | 0 | — | — | — | — | — |
| 1996–97 | Manchester Storm | BISL | 39 | 4 | 6 | 10 | 62 | 6 | 0 | 0 | 0 | 6 |
| FRA totals | | | 136 | 27 | 59 | 86 | 205 | 32 | 4 | 13 | 17 | 77 |
| NHL totals | | | 2 | 0 | 0 | 0 | 0 | — | — | — | — | — |

=== International ===
| Year | Team | Event | GP | G | A | Pts | PIM |
|---|---|---|---|---|---|---|---|
| 1981 | Canada | WJC | 5 | 1 | 0 | 1 | 4 |
| Junior totals | | | 5 | 1 | 0 | 1 | 4 |
