= Dale Hawerchuk =

Canadian ice hockey player and coach (1963–2020)

- Hockey Hall of Fame, 2001
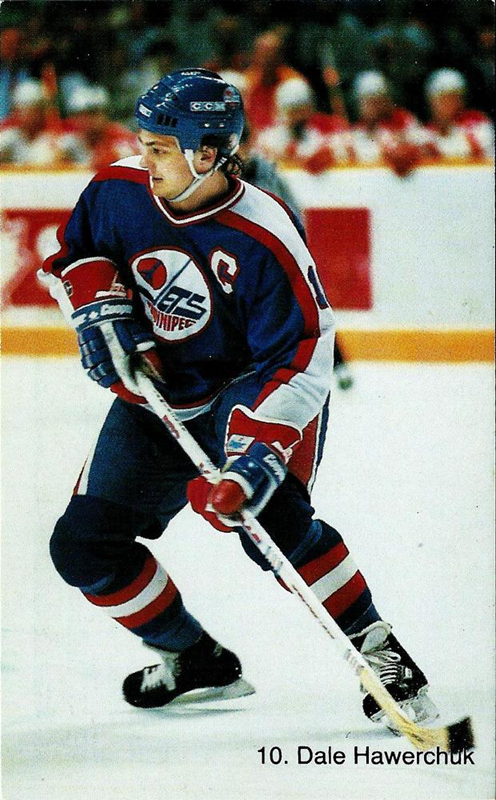
- Hawerchuk with the Winnipeg Jets in 1986
- Born: April 4, 1963 Toronto, Ontario, Canada
- Died: August 18, 2020 (aged 57) Barrie, Ontario, Canada
- Height: 5 ft 11 in (180 cm)
- Weight: 185 lb (84 kg; 13 st 3 lb)
- Position: Centre
- Shot: Left
- Played for: Winnipeg Jets; Buffalo Sabres; St. Louis Blues; Philadelphia Flyers
- National team: Canada
- NHL draft: 1st overall, 1981; Winnipeg Jets
- Playing career: 1981–1997
Medal record
Representing Canada
Ice hockey
World Championships
Bronze medal – third place	1982 Finland
Bronze medal – third place	1986 Moscow
Silver medal – second place	1989 Sweden
Canada Cup
Gold medal – first place	1987 Canada
Gold medal – first place	1991 Canada

Dale Martin Hawerchuk (April 4, 1963 – August 18, 2020) was a Canadian professional ice hockey player and coach. Nicknamed "Ducky", he played 16 seasons in the National Hockey League (NHL) for the Winnipeg Jets, Buffalo Sabres, St. Louis Blues, and Philadelphia Flyers.

A player who skated from a young age, Hawerchuk excelled in his very first season in the Quebec Major Junior Hockey League (QMJHL) with the Cornwall Royals, as he was awarded both the Michel Bergeron Trophy for his play as a rookie, where he led the league in scoring before leading the team to the Memorial Cup, where he won the Guy Lafleur Trophy for his playoff performance. His second season saw him with the Michel Brière Memorial Trophy for most valuable play and the Michael Bossy Trophy as the best promising prospect as the Royals won their second straight championship. He was selected as the first overall pick by the Winnipeg Jets in the 1981 NHL entry draft and immediately made waves for the team, recording 45 goals with 103 points on his way to being awarded the Calder Memorial Trophy; his points still stand as the most for an 18-year old player in one season. He recorded a 20-goal season in each of his first eleven seasons, which included scoring 53 in the 1984–85 season. He was traded to the Sabres in 1990; he departed Winnipeg as their all-time goals and points leader.

In his first four seasons in Buffalo, he recorded four straight 80-point seasons before injuries limited him in his final season with them in the 1994–95 season. He signed as a free agent with the Blues in 1995. In January 1996, he became the 23rd player to score 500 NHL goals. Two months later, he was traded to the Philadelphia Flyers. He was selected to his fifth NHL All-Star Game in the 1996–97 season; after reaching the Stanley Cup Final, Hawerchuk elected to retire due to a degenerative left hip. Internationally, Hawerchuk represented Canada on numerous occasions, which saw him win the Canada Cup in 1987 and 1991. He was elected to the Hockey Hall of Fame in his second year of eligibility in 2001. Hawerchuk served as the head coach of the Barrie Colts of the Ontario Hockey League from 2010 to 2019.

== Early life ==
Hawerchuk was a young prodigy who received his first pair of skates at age two and, according to his father Ed, "was skating before he could walk." Beginning competitive hockey at age four, Hawerchuk demonstrated superior skills almost immediately. At the Quebec International Pee-Wee Hockey Tournament, he scored all eight goals during an 8–1 victory in the finals, smashing the longstanding record by the legendary Guy Lafleur. By age 15, the famed Oshawa Generals offered him a tryout, though he did not make the team. In 1979, Hawerchuk was selected sixth overall by the Cornwall Royals of the Quebec Major Junior Hockey League and became somewhat of a rarity: a Toronto-born player starring in the QMJHL. He recorded 103 points and was named Rookie of the Year. Hawerchuk was the playoff MVP and led the Royals to the Memorial Cup championship on the basis of 45 points in the postseason (20 goals and 25 assists) in 18 playoff games. He became the youngest player to win the Guy Lafleur Trophy for his QMJHL playoff performance. In his second junior year, he scored 81 goals and 183 points to lead the CHL in scoring. He led the Royals to their second consecutive Memorial Cup title with a tournament record eight goals that saw him win the Stafford Smythe Memorial Trophy.

He was named a QMJHL First Team All-Star, the Canadian Major Junior Player of the Year, and Memorial Cup MVP. In 144 regular season games, he had 118 goals and 168 assists for 286 points. In 37 playoff games, he had 80 points.

== Playing career ==
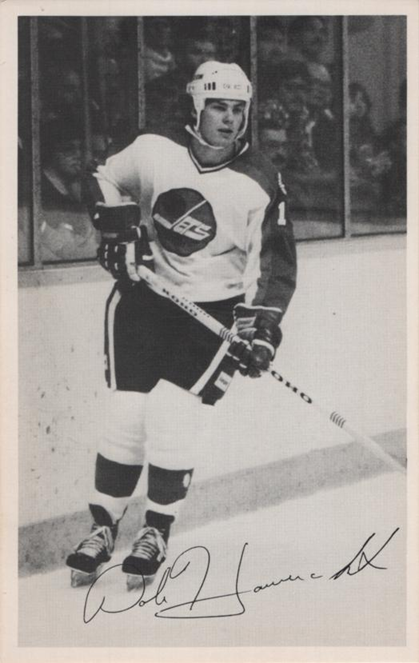
Hawerchuk early in his career with the Winnipeg Jets

Hawerchuk was extensively scouted by the Winnipeg Jets and their general manager John Ferguson. The Jets selected Hawerchuk first overall in the 1981 NHL entry draft, ahead of fellow future Hall of Famers Ron Francis, Grant Fuhr, and Chris Chelios. Hawerchuk immediately became Winnipeg's star player, leading the Jets to what was at the time the largest single-season turnaround in NHL history, a 48-point improvement. In a 2001 interview, Ferguson stated his belief that Hawerchuk would be special in the NHL from his very first game, marveling at Hawerchuk making a play against veteran defender Carol Vadnais. Hawerchuk recorded 45 goals and 58 assists for a total of 103 points, which made him the youngest player to record 100 points in a season and the first NHL player to record 40 goals and 100 points in their first season. He won the Calder Memorial Trophy for his rookie play; his point mark is still the record for all 18-year old players in league history. He also played in that season's All-Star Game.

Hawerchuk recorded 91 points in his second season, then hit the 100-plus point plateau for the next five consecutive years. In the game against the Los Angeles Kings on March 6, 1984, Hawerchuk set an NHL record with five assists in the second period of the 7–3 victory (the record was tied 39 years later by Kris Letang). The 1984–85 season saw him record a career-high 53 goals with 130 points while five of his teammates recorded 30 goal seasons; the Stanley Cup playoffs saw him play in just three games as Winnipeg was swept in the second round due to Hawerchuk suffering broken ribs, which he still remembered when asked about the team decades later. He finished 2nd in the Hart Memorial Trophy for most valuable play to Wayne Gretzky; it was the highest finish in his career and is the highest MVP voting finish in franchise history. From December 19, 1982 through December 10, 1988, he played in 475 consecutive regular season games, the longest streak in franchise history.

The firing of Ferguson in 1988 sowed the first seeds of the end of Hawerchuk's tenure with Winnipeg, as Ferguson was replaced as GM with Mike Smith, who reportedly told Hawerchuk that if it were up to him, he would have selected Bobby Carpenter instead of Hawerchuk in the 1981 draft. At the close of the 1990 Stanley Cup playoffs, which saw the Jets lose to the Oilers after having a 3-1 series lead, Hawerchuk went to team owner Barry Shenkarow asking to be traded. He later stated in a 2014 interview that "there were two Winnipegs. There was the John Ferguson era, which was positive, upbeat, a really community-driven team. And then the Mike Smith era, which was negative and pessimistic. That ran through the media."

During the 1990 NHL entry draft, Hawerchuk was involved in a blockbuster trade on June 16, 1990. According to Smith, only the St. Louis Blues and Buffalo Sabres showed the most interest in Hawerchuk, with the Blues reportedly offering Sergio Momesso and Peter Zezel, which Smith declined. Along with Winnipeg's first-round choice (14th overall pick, Brad May) in the draft, Hawerchuk was dealt to the Buffalo Sabres for Phil Housley, Scott Arniel, Jeff Parker and Buffalo's first-round choice (19th overall, Keith Tkachuk). Over the next four years, he recorded no fewer than 86 points in a season. On March 8, 1991, he became the 31st player to record 1,000 career points, doing so on a goal against the Chicago Blackhawks. His point totals fell off during an injury-plagued and lockout-shortened 1994–95 season.

In 1995, with the Sabres looking to slash team salary, he signed a three-year contract with the St. Louis Blues, recording 41 points in 66 games. On January 31, 1996, he became the 23rd player to score 500 goals, doing so off goaltender Felix Potvin of the Toronto Maple Leafs. He was traded to the Philadelphia Flyers for Craig McTavish on March 15, 1996. He finished the season strongly, with 20 points in the final 16 regular-season games and adding nine points in the playoffs. The next season, he missed 27 games due to an arthritic left hip but managed 34 points and played in his fifth NHL All-Star Game. His appearance with the Flyers in the Stanley Cup Final marked the only time any of his teams advanced past the second round of the playoffs. His 1,282 combined games played before reaching the Stanley Cup Final established a record for most played by a number one draft pick before playing in a Final until he was surpassed by Joe Thornton in 2016. The team was swept in four games by the Detroit Red Wings. Hawerchuk announced his retirement on August 25, 1997 at age 34 due to a degenerative left hip.

He played for Team Canada in the 1987 Canada Cup tournament, and had a goal and two assists in the decisive third game of the Finals against the Soviets. Late in the third period, he won the face-off that led to Canada's most famous goal and tied up with the Russian player who tried to check Mario Lemieux at centre ice, allowing Lemieux to take Wayne Gretzky's pass in the slot for the series winner. Hawerchuk was named Canada's MVP for that decisive game. Commentators remarked on his ability in the series to switch from being a goal scorer to a mucker and grinder. Hawerchuk was also key to Canada's 1991 Canada Cup victory.

== Post-playing career ==
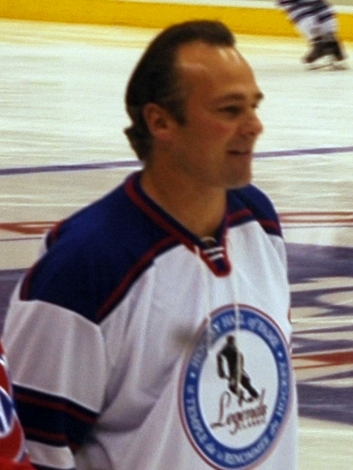
Hawerchuk in 2008

Hawerchuk became the president, director of hockey operations, and primary owner of the Ontario Provincial Junior A Hockey League's Orangeville Crushers in 2007. He left this position in 2010 when Howie Campbell, owner of the Barrie Colts called to inquire about his services for his team in the Ontario Hockey League.

On June 4, 2010, the Colts named Hawerchuk as their head coach and director of hockey operations. The 2010–11 season was a rebuilding one for the Colts, as the team went 15–49–2–2, missing the playoffs for the first time in team history. In his sophomore year, the 2011–12 season, Hawerchuk amassed a record of 40–23–3–2; a significant improvement over his rookie season as bench boss of the Colts. They advanced to the J. Ross Robertson Cup Final in 2013, where they lost to the London Knights in seven games. Among the players to play for the Colts under Hawerchuk's tenure included Mark Scheifele. He won four division titles with the team from 2010 to 2019.

== Personal life ==
Hawerchuk was born in Toronto, Ontario, but grew up in Oshawa, Ontario. He was married to Crystal, whom he met in Manitoba while playing for the Jets. The couple had three children.

Hawerchuk's son Ben Hawerchuk plays professional hockey as a forward for the South Carolina Stingrays of the ECHL. Ben had previously played for the Barrie Colts.

=== Illness and death ===
In 2019, Hawerchuk announced he would be taking a leave of absence from the Colts for health reasons, which was later revealed to be stomach cancer. Hawerchuk completed a course of chemotherapy in April 2020, but died on August 18, 2020, at the age of 57. He was buried in Thornton Cemetery in Oshawa.

The new incarnation of the Jets, as a tribute to Hawerchuk, would include said tribute as part of their 10th anniversary logo for the 2020/21 season (the logo also being worn as a patch on all team jerseys), with his number 10 in the center enclosed in a black circle.

== Awards and achievements ==
- RDS Cup (QMJHL Rookie of the Year) - 1980
- Guy Lafleur Trophy (QMJHL Playoff MVP) – 1980
- QMJHL Champion – 1980, 1981
- Memorial Cup champion (1980, 1981)
- Memorial Cup All-Star First Team – 1980, 1981
- Jean Béliveau Trophy (QMJHL Scoring Champion) – 1981
- QMJHL First Team All-Star – 1981
- Michel Brière Memorial Trophy (QMJHL Player of the Year) – 1981
- Stafford Smythe Memorial Trophy (Memorial Cup MVP) – 1981
- CHL Player of the Year – 1981
- NHL All-Star Game – 1982, 1985, 1986, 1988, 1997
- Calder Memorial Trophy – 1982
- First All-Star Team – 1985
- Inducted into the Hockey Hall of Fame in 2001
- Honoured Member of the Manitoba Hockey Hall of Fame
- Member of the Manitoba Sports Hall of Fame (2013)

== NHL records and achievements ==
- Only player to play 1,000 NHL games before turning 31
- Most assists in a single period: 5 (March 6, 1984), shared with Kris Letang

== Legacy ==
In a poll of NHL general managers during the mid-1980s asking them to select the player they would start a franchise with, Hawerchuk was voted third behind only Gretzky and Paul Coffey. He retired with 518 goals, 891 assists and 1,409 points, which at the time was 10th best in league history.

Hawerchuk was one of the premier centres in an era dominated by Wayne Gretzky and Mario Lemieux and noted for his high hockey intelligence and everyman qualities; in his first 13 seasons in the league, his 1,298 career points were second only to Gretzky for players in that timespan. Hawerchuk retired as one of only twelve players with 500 goals and 800 assists. He was one of fifteen players with seven 40-goal seasons and one of thirteen players with six 100-point seasons in NHL history. Hawerchuk set a record for most points by a player in his teens with 194, a mark that was not surpassed for two decades until Sidney Crosby did so.

He was the only Winnipeg player to record 900 points until Mark Scheifele (who was coached by Hawerchuk when playing with the Colts) of the modern Winnipeg Jets reached the mark in 2026. When Scheifele had passed Ilya Kovalchuk for most goals in Thrashers/Jets history with his 329th goal in 2025, he openly stated that he was chasing Hawerchuk's 379 goals as a member of the original Jets, with Dale's son Eric stating his excitement at the possibility. A charitable initiative was established in his honor that aimed to support causes close to him and his family.

The alternative rock band Les Dales Hawerchuk was named after him after lead singer Sylvain Séguin found his hockey card in his car after being told that his band would need "a name" in order to perform at a festival. Hawerchuk subsequently gave them permission to use his name on the condition that they "stay out of jail".

He was inducted into the Phoenix Coyotes Ring of Honor in 2007, becoming the third player to be inducted after Bobby Hull and Thomas Steen. The Jets/Coyotes franchise retired his number 10 on April 5, 2007. Unlike Hull and Steen, who were honored in Jets colors, Hawerchuk's number was retired in Coyotes apparel, despite the fact that Hawerchuk never played in Phoenix. He was inducted into the Buffalo Sabres Hall of Fame in 2011. When the NHL returned to Winnipeg, he was honored by the team by being named captain of the Winnipeg Jets alumni squad at the 2016 Heritage Classic. He was inducted into the team's Hall of Fame in 2017 and a statue was constructed in his likeness near the Canada Life Centre, the Jets' current arena located in downtown Winnipeg. Out of respect for Hawerchuk, number 10 has not been worn by any Jets player since the team relocated to Winnipeg in 2011. The Barrie Colts retired the number 10 jersey in Hawerchuk's honor in 2022, and Colts owner Howie Campbell stated that Hawerchuk "was 10 times the man that he was a hockey player.” In 2022, he was named the 55th best player of the NHL modern era by the The Athletic.

In 2026, in honor of the 50th anniversary of the Canadian Hockey League, he was named number ten on the CHL’s Top 50 Players of the Last 50 Years.

== Career statistics ==
=== Regular season and playoffs ===
			Regular season					Playoffs
Season	Team	League	GP	G	A	Pts	PIM	GP	G	A	Pts	PIM
1978–79	Oshawa Legionnaires	MetJHL	36	32	52	84	—	—	—	—	—	—
1979–80	Cornwall Royals	QMJHL	72	37	66	103	21	18	20	25	45	0
1979–80	Cornwall Royals	M-Cup	—	—	—	—	—	5	1	5	6	0
1980–81	Cornwall Royals	QMJHL	72	81	102	183	69	19	15	20	35	8
1980–81	Cornwall Royals	M-Cup	—	—	—	—	—	5	8	4	12	4
1981–82	Winnipeg Jets	NHL	80	45	58	103	47	4	1	7	8	5
1982–83	Winnipeg Jets	NHL	79	40	51	91	31	3	1	4	5	8
1983–84	Winnipeg Jets	NHL	80	37	65	102	73	3	1	1	2	0
1984–85	Winnipeg Jets	NHL	80	53	77	130	74	3	2	1	3	4
1985–86	Winnipeg Jets	NHL	80	46	59	105	44	3	0	3	3	0
1986–87	Winnipeg Jets	NHL	80	47	53	100	52	10	5	8	13	4
1987–88	Winnipeg Jets	NHL	80	44	77	121	59	5	3	4	7	16
1988–89	Winnipeg Jets	NHL	75	41	55	96	28	—	—	—	—	—
1989–90	Winnipeg Jets	NHL	79	26	55	81	70	7	3	5	8	2
1990–91	Buffalo Sabres	NHL	80	31	58	89	32	6	2	4	6	10
1991–92	Buffalo Sabres	NHL	77	23	75	98	27	7	2	5	7	0
1992–93	Buffalo Sabres	NHL	81	16	80	96	52	8	5	9	14	2
1993–94	Buffalo Sabres	NHL	81	35	51	86	91	7	0	7	7	4
1994–95	Buffalo Sabres	NHL	23	5	11	16	2	2	0	0	0	0
1995–96	St. Louis Blues	NHL	66	13	28	41	22	—	—	—	—	—
1995–96	Philadelphia Flyers	NHL	16	4	16	20	4	12	3	6	9	12
1996–97	Philadelphia Flyers	NHL	51	12	22	34	32	17	2	5	7	0
NHL totals			1,188	518	891	1,409	740	97	30	69	99	67

=== International ===
Year	Team	Event	GP	G	A	Pts	PIM
1981	Canada	WJC	5	5	4	9	2
1982	Canada	WC	10	3	1	4	0
1986	Canada	WC	8	2	4	6	4
1987	NHL All-Stars	RV-87	2	0	1	1	2
1987	Canada	CC	9	4	2	6	0
1989	Canada	WC	10	4	8	12	6
1991	Canada	CC	8	2	3	5	0
Junior totals			5	5	4	9	2
Senior totals			47	15	19	34	12

== Coaching record ==
Team	Year	Regular season						Post season
Team	Year	G	W	L	OTL	Pts	Finish	Result
Barrie Colts	2010–11	68	15	49	4	34	5th in Central	Missed playoffs
Barrie Colts	2011–12	68	40	23	5	85	2nd in Central	Lost in 2nd round (OTT)
Barrie Colts	2012–13	68	44	20	4	92	1st in Central	Lost in final round (LDN)
Barrie Colts	2013–14	68	37	28	3	77	2nd in Central	Lost in 2nd round (NBB)
Barrie Colts	2014–15	68	41	24	3	85	1st in Central	Lost in 2nd round (NBB)
Barrie Colts	2015–16	68	43	22	3	89	1st in Central	Lost in 3rd round (NIA)
Barrie Colts	2016–17	68	17	44	7	41	5th in Central	Missed playoffs
Barrie Colts	2017–18	68	42	21	5	89	1st in Central	Lost in 2nd Round (KGN)
Barrie Colts	2018–19	68	26	38	4	56	5th in Central	Missed playoffs

== See also ==
- Captain (hockey)
- List of NHL players with 1000 points
- List of NHL players with 500 goals
- List of NHL statistical leaders

Preceded by Doug Wickenheiser	NHL first overall draft pick 1981	Succeeded by Gord Kluzak
Preceded by Dave Babych	Winnipeg Jets first-round draft pick 1981	Succeeded by Jim Kyte
Preceded by Lucien DeBlois	Winnipeg Jets captain 1984–90; With; Randy Carlyle and Thomas Steen; 1989–90	Succeeded by Randy Carlyle; Thomas Steen
Preceded by Peter Stastny	Winner of the Calder Memorial Trophy; 1982	Succeeded by Steve Larmer
Preceded by Doug Wickenheiser	CHL Player of the Year; 1981	Succeeded by Dave Simpson
