= Dan Frawley (ice hockey) =

Canadian ice hockey player

- Born: June 2, 1962 (age 64) Sturgeon Falls, Ontario, Canada
- Height: 6 ft 0 in (183 cm)
- Weight: 170 lb (77 kg; 12 st 2 lb)
- Position: Right wing
- Shot: Right
- Played for: Pittsburgh Penguins; Chicago Blackhawks
- NHL draft: 204th overall, 1980; Chicago Blackhawks
- Playing career: 1981–1998

William Daniel Frawley (born June 2, 1962) is a Canadian former professional ice hockey player. During his junior hockey years, Frawley played for the Sudbury Wolves of the OHA and the Cornwall Royals of the QMJHL, before being drafted by the Chicago Black Hawks, 204th overall in the 1980 NHL entry draft. Frawley spent most of the next two years playing in the AHL. While playing with the Cornwall Royals, the team won the 1981 Memorial Cup against the Kitchener Rangers.

== NHL career ==
Frawley played with the Blackhawks during the 1984–85 season (his NHL rookie season). On the 7 October 1985, the Pittsburgh Penguins picked Frawley in the waiver draft. Frawley spent the subsequent four years (the rest of his NHL career) with the Penguins. He served as captain from October until December 1987, when Mario Lemieux took over after a torn ligament kept Frawley out of the lineup. He returned after surgery in early 1988.

== Return to the minors ==
In 1989 Frawley returned to the AHL, retiring in 1993. However, he came out of retirement in 1995 and played two more years, with the Rochester Americans of the AHL, winning the 1996 Calder Cup. He retired from professional hockey a second time in 1998, after the 1997–98 season.

== Amerks Hall Of Fame ==
In 2003, Frawley was selected to the Rochester Americans Hall Of Fame. His contributions as a longtime player, and his work ethic earned him this honor.

== Career statistics ==
			Regular season					Playoffs
Season	Team	League	GP	G	A	Pts	PIM	GP	G	A	Pts	PIM
1979–80	Sudbury Wolves	OMJHL	63	21	26	47	67	8	0	1	1	2
1980–81	Cornwall Royals	QMJHL	28	10	14	24	76	18	5	12	17	37
1980–81	Cornwall Royals	MC	—	—	—	—	—	5	1	4	5	21
1981–82	Cornwall Royals	OHL	64	27	50	77	239	5	3	8	11	19
1982–83	Springfield Indians	AHL	80	30	27	57	107	—	—	—	—	—
1983–84	Springfield Indians	AHL	69	22	34	56	137	4	0	1	1	12
1983–84	Chicago Black Hawks	NHL	3	0	0	0	0	—	—	—	—	—
1984–85	Chicago Black Hawks	NHL	30	4	3	7	64	1	0	0	0	0
1984–85	Milwaukee Admirals	IHL	26	11	12	23	125	—	—	—	—	—
1985–86	Pittsburgh Penguins	NHL	69	10	11	21	174	—	—	—	—	—
1986–87	Pittsburgh Penguins	NHL	78	14	14	28	218	—	—	—	—	—
1987–88	Pittsburgh Penguins	NHL	47	6	8	14	152	—	—	—	—	—
1988–89	Pittsburgh Penguins	NHL	46	3	4	7	66	—	—	—	—	—
1988–89	Muskegon Lumberjacks	IHL	24	12	16	28	35	14	6	4	10	31
1989–90	Muskegon Lumberjacks	IHL	82	31	47	78	165	15	9	12	21	51
1990–91	Rochester Americans	AHL	74	15	31	46	152	14	4	7	11	34
1991–92	Rochester Americans	AHL	78	28	23	51	208	16	7	5	12	35
1992–93	Rochester Americans	AHL	75	17	27	44	216	17	1	7	8	70
1995–96	Rochester Americans	AHL	77	12	16	28	194	19	5	6	11	8
1996–97	Rochester Americans	AHL	77	11	22	33	115	10	2	2	4	8
1997–98	Rochester Americans	AHL	75	12	20	32	175	4	0	0	0	2
AHL totals			605	147	199	346	1284	84	19	28	47	166
NHL totals			273	37	40	77	674	1	0	0	0	0

== Post-retirement ==
An Ojibwe from Nipissing First Nation, Frawley now resides in eastern Ontario, in Brinston, near Iroquois, with his wife, Wanda, and 4 sons.

Keeping active in the First Nations community, Frawley and other Indigenous former NHL players, such as Ted Nolan, John Chabot, and Denny Lambert took part in a charity match in Wiikwemkoong First Nation against the local police force January 28, 2017. Frawley and many other former native NHL players are very active in their native communities, engaging native youth as motivational speakers teaching about the importance of education, goal setting, substance abuse, and life skills that the future native leaders will need. They often host hockey clinics to encourage both young male and female athletes to enhance their physical skills as well as to develop an understanding of teamwork and cooperation with others. Since 2007, Frawley has been coaching minor hockey in the small native community of Chisasibi, using hockey as a means to teach young native athletes about the importance of education and physical activity. Initially, he was a hockey instructor for the Chisasibi Junior hunters minor midget team, and is now a youth hockey coordinator in Chisasibi.

Dan currently works for the Canadian Wildlife Federation.

Preceded by Terry Ruskowski	Pittsburgh Penguins captain 1987	Succeeded by Mario Lemieux
