= Cornwall Royals =

Canadian junior ice hockey team (1960s–1992

- City: Cornwall, Ontario
- League: QMJHL (1969–1981); OHL (1981–92)
- Operated: 1969 to 1992
- Home arena: Cornwall Civic Complex
- Colours: Blue, white and red

Franchise history
- 1969–1992: Cornwall Royals
- 1992–1994: Newmarket Royals
- 1994–present: Sarnia Sting

Championships
- Playoff championships: 1972, 1980, & 1981 Memorial Cup Champions

The Cornwall Royals were a junior ice hockey team based in Cornwall, Ontario, Canada. The team played in the Quebec Major Junior Hockey League (QMJHL) from 1969 to 1981, and the Ontario Hockey League (OHL) from 1981 to 1992. They won the Memorial Cup three times as junior champions of Canada: in 1971, 1980, and 1981.

The Royals shared a common name with teams that played in the Quebec Senior Hockey League, the Central Junior A Hockey League.

== History ==
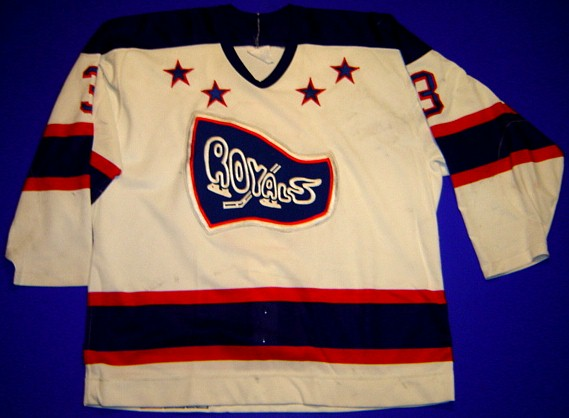
Cornwall Royals home jersey

From 1961 until 1969, the Cornwall Royals were successful members of the Central Junior A Hockey League (CJHL). As perennial CJHL champions, they represented that league at the playdowns for the 1966, 1967 and 1968 Memorial Cup national junior hockey championships, falling in the quarterfinals each year against the representatives from Quebec.

After an application to join the OHL was rejected, the franchise became one of the inaugural teams of the Quebec Major Junior Hockey League in 1969. The Cornwall Royals were one of the league's premier teams during its tenure in the QMJHL, winning three Memorial Cup titles.

For the 1981–82 season, the team transferred into the Ontario Hockey League.

The Royals suffered through many tough seasons and poor attendance after moving to the OHL. The switch in leagues alienated many die-hard fans from across the Quebec border. Seeking better fortunes, the franchise moved to Newmarket, Ontario to play as the Newmarket Royals in 1992. In 1994 the team was bought by the Ciccarelli brothers and moved to Sarnia, Ontario as the Sarnia Sting.

== Championships ==
The Cornwall Royals are one of only 7 clubs to win consecutive Memorial Cup championships. They did so in 1980 and 1981. In total, the Royals won 3 Memorial Cups, 3 President's Cups, and 5 division titles while in the QMJHL. The Royals did not win any OHL championships.

CJHL Bogart Cup Championships: 1966, 1967, 1968

President's Cup
Playoff Champions in the QMJHL.

- 1972 QMJHL Champions vs. Quebec Remparts
- 1980 QMJHL Champions vs. Sherbrooke Castors
- 1981 QMJHL Champions vs. Trois-Rivieres Draveurs

Jean Rougeau Trophy
Regular season champions in the QMJHL.

- 1971–1972 96 points
- 1980–1981 90 points

West Division Trophy
First overall in the West Division.

- 1973–1974 94 points

Lebel Division Trophy
First overall in the Lebel Division.

- 1977–1978 100 points
- 1979–1980 88 points
- 1980–1981 90 points

Memorial Cups

- 1972 CHL Champions vs. Peterborough Petes
- 1980 CHL Champions vs. Peterborough Petes
- 1981 CHL Champions vs. Kitchener Rangers

== Coaches ==
Orval Tessier guided the Cornwall Royals to the Memorial Cup championship in 1972. Doug Carpenter coached the 1980 Royals, and Bob Kilger in 1981.

Marc Crawford was a former Cornwall Royals player. He won the Stanley Cup as coach of the Colorado Avalanche. He also coached the Vancouver Canucks, the Los Angeles Kings, and the Dallas Stars.

List of Coaches

(Multiple years in parentheses)

- 1981–82 Bob Kilger
- 1982–83 Jocelyn Guevremont
- 1983–84 Jocelyn Guevremont / Floyd Crawford
- 1984–85 Floyd Crawford / Tony Zappia
- 1985–86 Tony Zappia
- 1986–89 Orval Tessier (3)
- 1989–91 Marc Crawford (2)
- 1991–92 John Lovell

*1982–83 coaches Bob Kilger, Bill Murphy, Gord Woods, Jocelyn Guevremont

== Players ==
=== Award recipients ===
Season	Player	Award(s)	Recognition	Source
1970–71	Bob Murphy	Coaches' Trophy	Rookie of the year	
1971–72	Bob Murray	Coaches' Trophy	Rookie of the year	
1971–72	Richard Brodeur	Jacques Plante Memorial Trophy	Lowest goals against average	
1971–72	Gerry Teeple	Frank J. Selke Memorial Trophy	Most sportsmanlike player	
1973–74	Gary MacGregor	Michel Brière Memorial Trophy	Most valuable player	
1973–74	Gary MacGregor	Frank J. Selke Memorial Trophy	Most sportsmanlike player	
1974–75	Mario Viens	Michel Brière Memorial Trophy	Most valuable player, regular season	
1975–76	Tim Bernhardt	Jacques Plante Memorial Trophy	Lowest goals against average	
1976–77	Tim Bernhardt	Jacques Plante Memorial Trophy	Lowest goals against average	
1977–78	Tim Bernhardt	Jacques Plante Memorial Trophy	Lowest goals against average	
1979–80	Dale Hawerchuk	Coaches' Trophy	Rookie of the year	
1979–80	Dale Hawerchuk	Guy Lafleur Trophy	Most valuable player, playoffs	
1980–81	Dale Hawerchuk	Jean Béliveau Trophy	Top scorer, regular season	
1980–81	Dale Hawerchuk	Michel Brière Memorial Trophy	Most valuable player	
1980–81	Dale Hawerchuk	CHL Player of the Year	Most valuable player	
1980–81	Dale Hawerchuk	Michael Bossy Trophy	Best professional prospect	
1980–81	Fred Boimistruck	Emile Bouchard Trophy	Defenceman of the year	
1982–83	Doug Gilmour	Eddie Powers Memorial Trophy	OHL Top Point Scorer	
1982–83	Doug Gilmour	Red Tilson Trophy	OHL Most valuable player	
1982–83	Ian MacInnis	Jim Mahon Memorial Trophy	OHL Top Scoring Right Winger	
1985–86	Ray Sheppard	Eddie Powers Memorial Trophy	OHL Top Point Scorer	
1985–86	Ray Sheppard	Jim Mahon Memorial Trophy	OHL Top Scoring Right Winger	
1985–86	Ray Sheppard	Red Tilson Trophy	OHL Most valuable player	
1987–88	Rick Tabaracci	OHL Goaltender of the Year	Voted best goaltender in the OHL	
1988–89	Owen Nolan	Emms Family Award	Rookie of the year	
1989–90	Owen Nolan	Jim Mahon Memorial Trophy	OHL Top Scoring Right Winger	
1989–90	John Slaney	Max Kaminsky Trophy	Most Outstanding Defenceman	
1989–90	John Slaney	CHL Defenceman of the Year		
1990–91	Nathan LaFayette	Bobby Smith Trophy	Scholastic player of the year	
1991–92	Nathan LaFayette	Bobby Smith Trophy	Scholastic player of the year	
1991–92	Nathan LaFayette	CHL Scholastic Player of the Year		

=== NHL alumni ===
Three alumni of the Cornwall Royals have been enshrined in the Hockey Hall of Fame, including Billy Smith, Dale Hawerchuk, and Doug Gilmour.

List of QMJHL (1969–1981) alumni in the National Hockey League (NHL) or World Hockey Association:

- Jeff Allan
- Dave Allison
- Scott Arniel
- Fred Arthur
- Reid Bailey
- Tim Bernhardt
- Fred Boimistruck
- Brian Bowles
- Richard Brodeur
- Eric Calder
- Alain Chevrier
- Bob Crawford
- Lou Crawford
- Marc Crawford
- Dan Daoust
- Jeff Eatough
- Dan Frawley
- Danny Geoffrion
- Doug Gilmour
- Dale Hawerchuk
- Blair MacDonald
- Gary MacGregor
- John Markell
- Corrado Micalef (Note: Borrowed player from the Sherbrooke Castors for the 1981 Memorial Cup)
- Bob Murray
- Graeme Nicolson
- Jim Park
- Rick Paterson
- Ron Scott
- Al Sims
- Billy Smith
- Ron Smith
- Pierre Viau
- Mario Viens
- John Wensink
- Rod Willard

List of OHL (1981–1992) alumni in the NHL:

- Scott Arniel
- Bob Babcock
- Eric Calder
- Jason Cirone
- Larry Courville
- Craig Duncanson
- Jeff Eatough
- Dan Frawley
- Doug Gilmour
- Jim Kyte
- Nathan LaFayette
- Alan Letang
- Guy Leveque
- Steve Maltais
- Owen Nolan
- Mike Prokopec
- Rob Ray
- Joe Reekie
- Ken Sabourin
- Mathieu Schneider
- Ray Sheppard
- John Slaney
- Mike Stapleton
- Jeremy Stevenson
- Rick Tabaracci
- Tom Thornbury
- Mike Tomlak
- Ryan Vandenbussche
- Michael Ware

== Season-by-season results ==
- Quebec Major Junior Hockey League season-by-season results (1969–1981):
- Ontario Hockey League season-by-season results (1981–1992):

Legend: GP = Games played, W = Wins, L = Losses, T = Ties, Pts = Points, GF = Goals for, GA = Goals against

Memorial Cup champions	League champions	League finalists

Season	Regular season									Playoffs
Season	GP	W	L	T	Pts	Pct	GF	GA	Finish	Playoffs
1969–70	56	24	31	1	49	0.438	223	255	2nd West	Lost quarterfinal (Verdun Maple Leafs) 4–2
1970–71	62	22	40	0	44	0.355	260	326	10th QMJHL	Did not qualify
1971–72	62	47	13	2	96	0.774	361	182	1st QMJHL	Won quarterfinal (Verdun Maple Leafs) 8–0; Won semifinal (Shawinigan Bruins) 8–2; Won QMJHL final (Quebec Remparts) 9–5; Won 1972 Memorial Cup final (Peterborough Petes) 2–1
1972–73	64	43	19	2	88	0.688	365	253	2nd QMJHL	Won quarterfinal (Montreal Bleu Blanc Rouge) 4–0; Won semifinal (Sorel Éperviers) 4–1; Lost QMJHL final (Quebec Remparts) 4–3
1973–74	70	46	22	2	94	0.671	438	328	1st West	Lost quarterfinal (Laval National) 4–1
1974–75	72	36	24	12	84	0.583	322	296	3rd West	Lost quarterfinal (Montreal Bleu Blanc Rouge) 4–0
1975–76	72	39	24	9	87	0.604	349	270	2nd West	Won quarterfinal (Montreal Juniors) 4–2; Lost semifinal (Quebec Remparts) 4–0
1976–77	72	38	24	10	86	0.597	345	281	2nd Lebel	Won quarterfinal (Trois-Rivières Draveurs) 8–4; Lost semifinal (Sherbrooke Castors) 9–0
1977–78	72	46	18	8	100	0.694	404	258	1st Lebel	Won quarterfinal (Hull Olympiques) 8–0; Lost semifinal (Montreal Juniors) 8–2
1978–79	72	29	36	7	65	0.451	361	397	3rd Lebel	Lost quarterfinal (Verdun Éperviers) 8–6
1979–80	72	41	25	6	88	0.611	388	333	1st Lebel	Won quarterfinal (Shawinigan Cataractes) 4–3; Won semifinal (Chicoutimi Saguenéens) 4–1; Won QMJHL final (Sherbrooke Castors) 4–2; Won 1980 Memorial Cup final (Peterborough Petes) 3–2
1980–81	72	44	26	2	90	0.625	403	311	1st Lebel	Won quarterfinal (Quebec Remparts) 4–3; Won semifinal (Sherbrooke Castors) 4–3; Won QMJHL final (Trois-Rivières Draveurs) 4–1; Won 1981 Memorial Cup final (Kitchener Rangers) 5–2
Royals transferred from the Quebec Major Junior Hockey League to the Ontario Hockey League
1981–82	68	28	35	5	61	0.449	303	327	6th Leyden	Lost division quarterfinal (Toronto Marlboros) 6–4
1982–83	70	36	33	1	73	0.521	370	335	5th Leyden	Won division quarterfinal (Toronto Marlboros) 7–1; Lost quarterfinal (Ottawa 67's) 8–0
1983–84	70	33	37	0	66	0.471	348	375	6th Leyden	Lost division quarterfinal (Peterborough Petes) 6–0
1984–85	66	34	30	2	70	0.530	355	344	4th Leyden	Won division quarterfinal (Toronto Marlboros) 8–2; Lost quarterfinal (Belleville Bulls) 6–2
1985–86	66	28	36	2	58	0.439	307	356	5th Leyden	Lost division quarterfinal (Belleville Bulls) 9–3
1986–87	66	23	40	3	49	0.371	261	369	6th Leyden	Lost division quarterfinal (Ottawa 67's) 4–1
1987–88	66	35	24	7	77	0.583	333	255	3rd Leyden	Won division quarterfinal (Belleville Bulls) 4–2; Lost quarterfinal (Ottawa 67's) 4–1
1988–89	66	31	30	5	67	0.508	350	308	4th Leyden	Won division quarterfinal (Toronto Marlboros) 4–2; Won quarterfinal (Ottawa 67's) 4–2; Lost semifinal (Peterborough Petes) 4–2
1989–90	66	24	38	4	52	0.394	309	361	6th Leyden	Lost division quarterfinal (Oshawa Generals) 4–2
1990–91	66	23	42	1	47	0.356	281	335	7th Leyden	Did not qualify
1991–92	66	38	22	6	82	0.621	328	289	3rd Leyden	Lost division quarterfinal (Ottawa 67's) 4–2

== Arenas ==
The Royals played home games at the Water Street Arena from 1969 to 1976. Moving across the road, the Royals played at the Cornwall Civic Complex from 1976 to 1992, and hosted the 1990 All-Star game between the OHL and the QMJHL, which the OHL won by a 3–0 score.

== Sources ==
- Lapp, Richard M.; Macaulay, Alec (1997). The Memorial Cup: Canada's National Junior Hockey Championship. Madeira Park, British Columbia: Harbour Publishing. ISBN 1-55017-170-4.
