= Fred Boimistruck =

Canadian ice hockey player

- Born: January 14, 1962 (age 63) Sudbury, Ontario, Canada
- Height: 5 ft 11 in (180 cm)
- Weight: 190 lb (86 kg; 13 st 8 lb)
- Position: Defence
- Shot: Right
- Played for: Toronto Maple Leafs; SC Langnau Tigers
- NHL draft: 43rd overall, 1980; Toronto Maple Leafs
- Playing career: 1981–1986

Frederick Michael Boimistruck, Jr. (born January 14, 1962) is a Canadian retired ice hockey defenceman. He played in the National Hockey League (NHL) for the Toronto Maple Leafs.

== Early life ==
Born in Sudbury, Ontario, Boimistruck grew up in Capreol, Ontario. He played junior ice hockey for the Cornwall Royals, playing twice for the Memorial Cup.

== Career ==
Boimistruck was selected by the Maple Leafs in the 1980 NHL draft, 43rd overall. He joined the Maple Leafs directly from junior, playing 57 games for Toronto, scoring two goals and eleven assists. The following season, Boimistruck played part of the season with Toronto, but mostly with their farm team, the St. Catharines Saints. After one further season at St. Catharines, Boimistruck played in Europe and for the Fort Wayne Komets. He finished his playing career in 1985–86 with the Flint Spirits.

After retiring, Boimistruck moved to Hornepayne and became a locomotive engineer.

== Career statistics ==
			Regular season					Playoffs
Season	Team	League	GP	G	A	Pts	PIM	GP	G	A	Pts	PIM
1979–80	Cornwall Royals	QMJHL	70	12	34	46	99	11	0	8	8	6
1980–81	Cornwall Royals	QMJHL	68	22	48	70	158	18	4	11	15	61
1981–82	Toronto Maple Leafs	NHL	57	2	11	13	32	—	—	—	—	—
1982–83	Toronto Maple Leafs	NHL	26	2	3	5	13	—	—	—	—	—
1982–83	St. Catharines Saints	AHL	50	6	23	29	32	—	—	—	—	—
1983–84	St. Catharines Saints	AHL	80	2	28	30	68	7	1	0	1	19
1984–85	Fort Wayne Komets	IHL	2	0	1	1	5	—	—	—	—	—
1984–85	SC Langnau	NLA	6	1	2	3	—	—	—	—	—	—
1985–86	Flint Spirits	IHL	17	3	6	9	15	—	—	—	—	—
1986–87	Brantford Motts Clamatos	OHA-Sr.	32	1	8	9	51	—	—	—	—	—
NHL totals			83	4	14	18	45	—	—	—	—	—

== Awards ==
- QMJHL First All-Star Team 1980–81
- Emile Bouchard Trophy, 1980–81
