= 2004–05 Philadelphia Flyers season =

NHL hockey team season

2004–05 Philadelphia Flyers
- Division: Atlantic
- Conference: Eastern
- 2004–05 record: Did not play

Team information
- General manager: Bob Clarke
- Coach: Ken Hitchcock
- Captain: Keith Primeau
- Arena: Wachovia Center
- Minor league affiliates: Philadelphia Phantoms; Trenton Titans

The 2004–05 Philadelphia Flyers season was the franchise's 38th season in the National Hockey League (NHL). However, season's games were canceled leaguewide due to the 2004–05 NHL lockout.

== Off-season ==
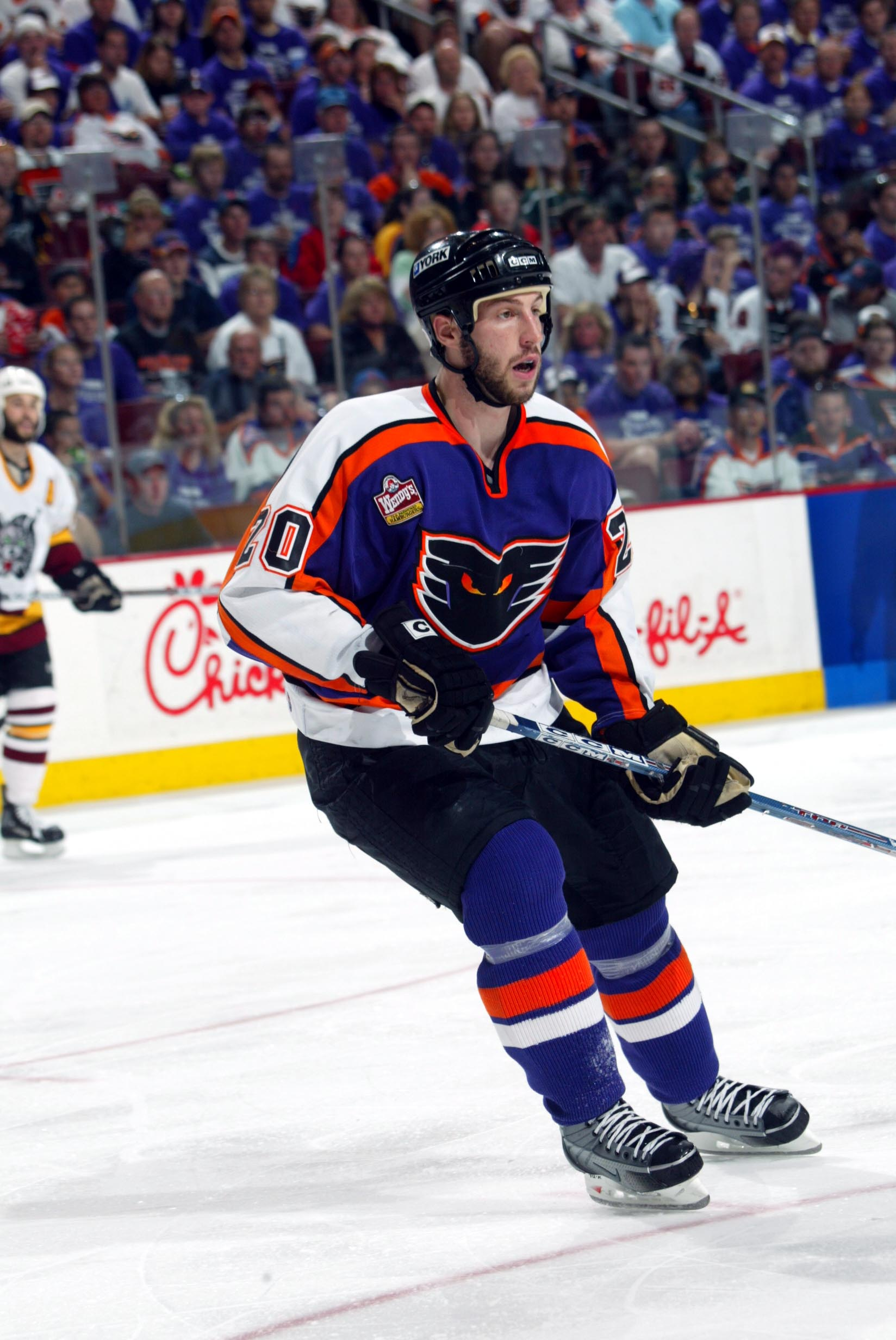
The Flyers signed unrestricted free agent R. J. Umberger in June. Umberger’s 65 points during the 2004–05 regular season led the Calder Cup champion Phantoms.

After being defeated in the seventh game of the 2004 Eastern Conference Finals by the eventual Stanley Cup champion Tampa Bay Lightning, the Flyers prepared for the looming labor uncertainty associated with the impending expiration of the existing NHL Collective Bargaining Agreement. While team captain Keith Primeau was re-signed to a four-year contract worth $17 million prior to hitting the free agent market, leading scorer Mark Recchi was not – general manager Bob Clarke said he would not re-sign Recchi until a new collective bargaining agreement was in place – and instead signed with the Pittsburgh Penguins on July 9. Contract offers were made to impending unrestricted free agents Vladimir Malakhov and Alexei Zhamnov, key acquisitions during the final quarter of the 2003–04 regular season, but the Flyers were unable to come to terms with either player.

Unsigned 2001 first-round draft pick R. J. Umberger, whose NHL rights had previously been held by the Vancouver Canucks and New York Rangers, signed with the Flyers as an unrestricted free agent on June 16. The Flyers signed free agent right wingers Mike Knuble of the Boston Bruins and Turner Stevenson of the New Jersey Devils to three-year contracts after the free agency period began. On July 13 undrafted free agent forward Tony Voce, who played four seasons at Boston College, became the first native of Philadelphia to sign with the Flyers.

== Schedule ==
The Flyers preseason and regular season schedules were announced on July 14, 2004.

2004–05 schedule
Preseason

Game	Date	Opponent	Time
1	September 23	@ Washington Capitals	7:00 p.m.
2	September 30	Washington Capitals	7:00 p.m.
3^{[a]}	October 2	@ New York Islanders	
4	October 5	New York Islanders	7:00 p.m.
5	October 6	New Jersey Devils	7:00 p.m.
6	October 9	@ New Jersey Devils	7:30 p.m.
Notes:^{a} Neutral site game which was scheduled to be played at the Giant Center in Hershey, Pennsylvania.

Regular season

Game	Date	Opponent	Time
1	October 13	@ Tampa Bay Lightning	7:30 p.m.
2	October 14	@ Florida Panthers	7:00 p.m.
3	October 16	@ Montreal Canadiens	7:00 p.m.
4	October 20	@ New York Rangers	7:30 p.m.
5	October 21	Carolina Hurricanes	7:00 p.m.
6	October 23	@ Ottawa Senators	7:00 p.m.
7	October 25	Chicago Blackhawks	7:00 p.m.
8	October 28	Montreal Canadiens	7:00 p.m.
9	November 2	New Jersey Devils	7:00 p.m.
10	November 5	@ Buffalo Sabres	8:00 p.m.
11	November 6	@ Washington Capitals	7:00 p.m.
12	November 8	St. Louis Blues	7:00 p.m.
13	November 11	Boston Bruins	7:00 p.m.
14	November 13	@ Pittsburgh Penguins	7:30 p.m.
15	November 17	New York Islanders	7:00 p.m.
16	November 19	Carolina Hurricanes	7:00 p.m.
17	November 20	@ Toronto Maple Leafs	7:00 p.m.
18	November 24	@ Washington Capitals	7:00 p.m.
19	November 26	Atlanta Thrashers	1:00 p.m.
20	November 27	@ New York Islanders	7:00 p.m.
21	November 30	Tampa Bay Lightning	7:00 p.m.
22	December 2	New York Rangers	7:00 p.m.
23	December 4	Buffalo Sabres	7:00 p.m.
24	December 7	@ Nashville Predators	8:00 p.m.
25	December 8	@ Dallas Stars	8:30 p.m.
26	December 10	New York Islanders	7:30 p.m.
27	December 13	@ Ottawa Senators	7:30 p.m.
28	December 15	Boston Bruins	7:30 p.m.
29	December 16	@ Boston Bruins	7:00 p.m.
30	December 18	New York Rangers	7:00 p.m.
31	December 21	Florida Panthers	7:00 p.m.
32	December 23	@ Pittsburgh Penguins	7:30 p.m.
33	December 27	@ Vancouver Canucks	10:30 p.m.
34	December 29	@ Calgary Flames	9:00 p.m.
35	December 30	@ Edmonton Oilers	9:00 p.m.
36	January 2	@ Chicago Blackhawks	7:00 p.m.
37	January 5	@ Minnesota Wild	7:30 p.m.
38	January 7	@ Mighty Ducks of Anaheim	10:30 p.m.
39	January 8	@ Los Angeles Kings	10:30 p.m.
40	January 12	Phoenix Coyotes	7:30 p.m.
41	January 14	@ Carolina Hurricanes	7:00 p.m.
42	January 15	Buffalo Sabres	7:00 p.m.
43	January 18	@ New Jersey Devils	7:30 p.m.
44	January 20	Pittsburgh Penguins	7:00 p.m.
45	January 22	@ New York Rangers	2:00 p.m.
46	January 24	@ Washington Capitals	7:00 p.m.
47	January 25	Tampa Bay Lightning	7:30 p.m.
48	January 29	Atlanta Thrashers	4:00 p.m.
49	February 1	@ New York Islanders	7:00 p.m.
50	February 3	Mighty Ducks of Anaheim	7:00 p.m.
51	February 5	New Jersey Devils	2:00 p.m.
52	February 8	Los Angeles Kings	7:00 p.m.
53	February 10	San Jose Sharks	7:00 p.m.
54	February 15	@ Montreal Canadiens	7:30 p.m.
55	February 17	New Jersey Devils	7:00 p.m.
56	February 19	@ New York Rangers	2:00 p.m.
57	February 20	Montreal Canadiens	7:00 p.m.
58	February 23	@ Carolina Hurricanes	7:00 p.m.
59	February 24	Pittsburgh Penguins	7:00 p.m.
60	February 26	Colorado Avalanche	1:30 p.m.
61	February 28	Ottawa Senators	7:00 p.m.
62	March 2	@ Atlanta Thrashers	7:30 p.m.
63	March 3	Washington Capitals	7:00 p.m.
64	March 5	@ Boston Bruins	1:00 p.m.
65	March 7	@ New Jersey Devils	7:30 p.m.
66	March 8	@ Toronto Maple Leafs	7:30 p.m.
67	March 10	Toronto Maple Leafs	7:00 p.m.
68	March 12	Pittsburgh Penguins	3:00 p.m.
69	March 15	@ Florida Panthers	7:00 p.m.
70	March 16	@ Tampa Bay Lightning	7:30 p.m.
71	March 19	@ New Jersey Devils	1:00 p.m.
72	March 21	Columbus Blue Jackets	7:00 p.m.
73	March 23	@ Buffalo Sabres	7:30 p.m.
74	March 24	Ottawa Senators	7:00 p.m.
75	March 26	Toronto Maple Leafs	7:00 p.m.
76	March 28	New York Islanders	7:00 p.m.
77	March 31	@ Atlanta Thrashers	7:30 p.m.
78	April 2	@ Pittsburgh Penguins	1:00 p.m.
79	April 3	Detroit Red Wings	3:30 p.m.
80	April 5	Florida Panthers	7:00 p.m.
81	April 7	New York Rangers	7:00 p.m.
82	April 9	@ New York Islanders	7:00 p.m.

== NHL lockout ==
The lockout started on September 16, 2004. Those Flyers with two-way contracts –– most notably Joni Pitkanen, Dennis Seidenberg, and Patrick Sharp –– were sent down to the team's American Hockey League affiliate, the Philadelphia Phantoms, while those with NHL-only contracts either sat out or played in another league.

While most locked out players were not entitled to their salaries, NHL teams were required to pay injured players until they were cleared to play. One such player was Flyers' star Jeremy Roenick. While the Flyers argued Roenick had passed his exit physical after the previous season, Roenick argued he was entitled to his $7.5 million salary since he would have been unable to start the 2004–05 season due to injury. Roenick sustained two concussions during the 2003–04 season, the second occurring during the fourth game of the Eastern Conference Finals, and had suffered from lingering post-concussion symptoms throughout the summer. After Roenick was cleared in late December to begin working out again, he received over $1 million of his salary for the games he would have missed in October and November.

NHL commissioner Gary Bettman announced the cancelation of the season on February 16, 2005.

=== Player activity ===
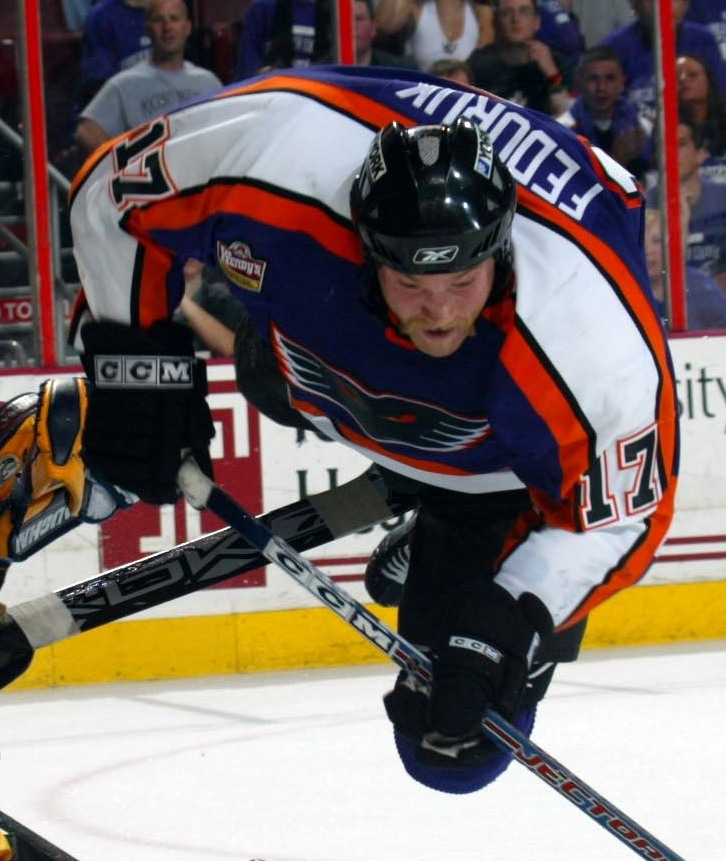
Todd Fedoruk signed an AHL contract with the Phantoms on October 21.

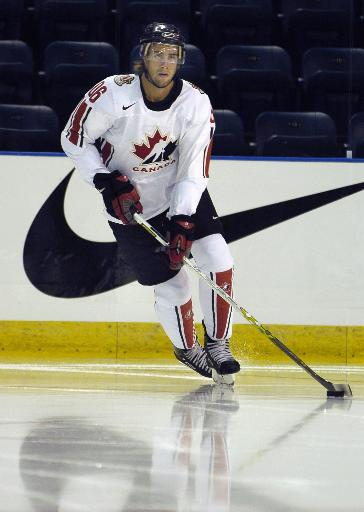
Simon Gagne played for Canada at the 2005 World Championships, but was otherwise inactive during the 2004–05 season.

The following is a list of Flyers with NHL-only contracts and whether they were active during the lockout. Vladimir Malakhov and Alexei Zhamnov are not included since their contracts expired prior to the lockout.

Player	Team	League/event	Ref
Tony Amonte			
Donald Brashear	Quebec Radio X	LNAH	
Sean Burke			
Eric Desjardins			
Robert Esche			
Todd Fedoruk	Philadelphia Phantoms	American Hockey League	
Simon Gagne	Canada	World Championships	
Michal Handzus	HKm Zvolen	Slovak Extraliga	
Michal Handzus	Slovakia	World Championships	
Kim Johnsson	HC Ambri-Piotta	Nationalliga A	
Sami Kapanen	KalPa	Mestis	
Mike Knuble	Linkopings HC	Elitserien	
Mike Knuble	United States	World Championships	
Claude Lapointe			
John LeClair			
Danny Markov	Vityaz Podolsk	Vysshaya Liga	
Keith Primeau			
Branko Radivojevic	Vsetin HC	Czech Extraliga	
Branko Radivojevic	Lulea HF	Elitserien	
Marcus Ragnarsson	Almtuna	Allsvenskan	
Jeremy Roenick			
Radovan Somik	MHC Martin	Slovak 1.Liga	
Radovan Somik	Vsetín HC	Czech Extraliga	
Radovan Somik	Malmo IF	Elitserien	
Turner Stevenson			
Mattias Timander	Modo Hockey	Elitserien	

== Farm teams ==
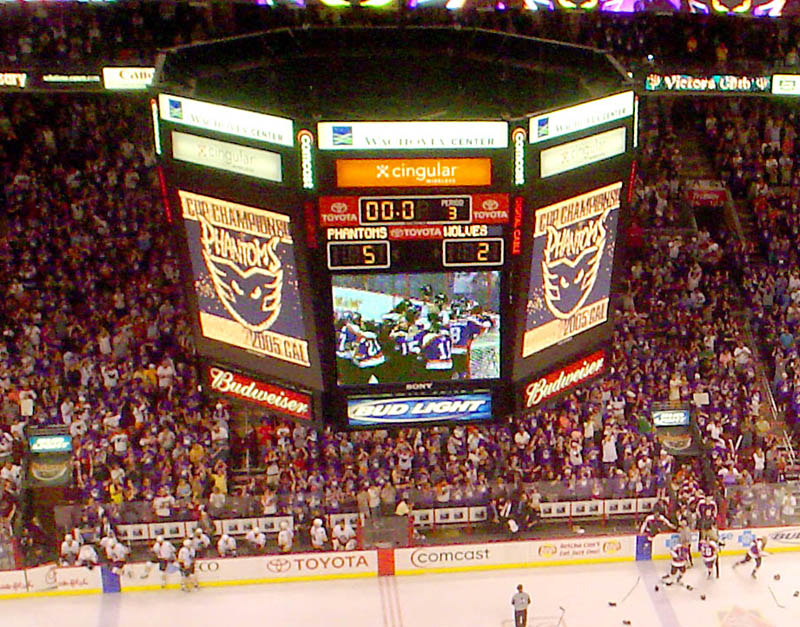
The Phantoms won their second Calder Cup on June 10, 2005.

The Flyers were affiliated with the Philadelphia Phantoms of the American Hockey League (AHL) and the Trenton Titans of the ECHL. Both teams were their league's champions.

=== Philadelphia Phantoms ===
With the Flyers season canceled, many players who would normally be in orange and black were in purple, orange, and black instead. Joni Pitkanen and Todd Fedoruk had spent the entirety of the previous season with the Flyers and over a dozen others on the Phantoms roster had previously spent time in the NHL. Led by mid-season acquisition Jon Sim's 35 goals and R. J. Umberger's 65 points, the Phantoms finished second in their division with a record of 48–25–3–4. Reinforced by the arrivals of top junior prospects Jeff Carter and Mike Richards to the team, the Phantoms defeated the Norfolk Admirals in six games, the Wilkes-Barre/Scranton Penguins in five games, and the Providence Bruins in six games to reach the finals. Holding the Chicago Wolves to four goals the entire series, the Phantoms swept the series and won the Calder Cup. Goaltender Antero Niittymaki was awarded the Jack A. Butterfield Trophy as playoff MVP.

=== Trenton Titans ===
Trenton finished second in their division and after defeating the Atlantic City Boardwalk Bullies in three games, the Reading Royals in four games, and the Alaska Aces in seven games, the Titans defeated the Florida Everblades in six games to win the Kelly Cup.

== Transactions ==
The Flyers were involved in the following transactions from June 8, 2004, the day after the deciding game of the 2004 Stanley Cup Finals, through February 16, 2005, the day the 2004–05 season was officially canceled.

=== Trades ===
Date	Details		Ref
June 27, 2004	To Philadelphia Flyers: 3rd-round pick in 2005	To Tampa Bay Lightning: 5th-round pick in 2004; 6th-round pick in 2004; San Jose's 6th-round pick in 2004	

=== Players acquired ===
Date	Player	Former team	Term	Via	Ref
June 16, 2004	R. J. Umberger	New York Rangers	2-year	Free agency	
June 24, 2004	Brent Robinson	Hamilton Bulldogs (AHL)	2-year	Free agency	
July 3, 2004	Mike Knuble	Boston Bruins	3-year	Free agency	
July 3, 2004	Turner Stevenson	New Jersey Devils	3-year	Free agency	
July 13, 2004	Tony Voce	Boston College (HE)	2-year	Free agency	
July 14, 2004	Eric Meloche	Pittsburgh Penguins	3-year	Free agency	
July 27, 2004	Josh Gratton	Cincinnati Mighty Ducks (AHL)	2-year	Free agency	
August 23, 2004	Ryan Ready	St. Louis Blues	1-year	Free agency	

=== Players lost ===
Date	Player	New team	Via (Note: In parentheses is the player’s free agency group on July 1 if applicable.)	Ref
July 1, 2004	Vladimir Malakhov (Note: Malakhov was inactive during the 2004–05 season.)		Contract expiration (III)	
July 6, 2004	Kirby Law	Minnesota Wild	Free agency (VI)	
July 9, 2004	Mark Recchi	Pittsburgh Penguins	Free agency (III)	
July 21, 2004	Andre Savage	Colorado Avalanche	Free agency (VI)	
August 16, 2004	Peter Vandermeer	Detroit Red Wings	Free agency (VI)	
September 8, 2004	Ian MacNeil	Schwenninger Wild Wings (ESBG)	Free agency (VI)	
September 17, 2004	Steve Gainey	Epinal Dolphins (FRA)	Free agency (VI)	
November 15, 2004	Alexei Zhamnov	Vityaz Chekhov (RUS-2)	Free agency (III)	
May 12, 2005	Mike Peluso		Retirement (VI)	

=== Signings ===
Date	Player	Term	Contract type	Ref
June 14, 2004	Sean Burke	1-year	Option exercised	
June 14, 2004	Robert Esche	1-year	Option exercised	
June 14, 2004	Keith Primeau	4-year	Re-signing	
August 2, 2004	Simon Gagne	1-year	Re-signing	
August 2, 2004	Antero Niittymaki	2-year	Re-signing	
August 2, 2004	Branko Radivojevic	1-year	Re-signing	
August 6, 2004	Michal Handzus	3-year	Re-signing	
August 8, 2004	Kim Johnsson	1-year	Arbitration award	
August 12, 2004	Mattias Timander	2-year	Re-signing	
August 19, 2004	Sami Kapanen	2-year	Extension	
September 8, 2004	Nick Deschenes	1-year	Re-signing	
September 8, 2004	Mark Murphy	2-year	Re-signing	
September 8, 2004	David Printz	1-year	Entry-level	

== Draft picks ==
Philadelphia's picks at the 2004 NHL entry draft, which was held at the RBC Center in Raleigh, North Carolina on June 26–27, 2004. The Flyers traded their first-round pick, 25th overall, their 2005 third-round pick, and Jeff Woywitka to the Edmonton Oilers for Mike Comrie on December 16, 2003. The Flyers also traded their originally allotted second, fifth, sixth, and seventh-round draft picks in three different trades.

Round	Pick	Player	Position	Nationality	Team (league)	Notes
3	92	Rob Bellamy	Right wing	United States	New England Jr. Coyotes (EJHL)	
4	101	R. J. Anderson	Defense	United States	Centennial High School (Minn.)	(Note: The Flyers traded Roman Cechmanek to the Los Angeles Kings for the Kings' second-round pick, 41st overall, on May 28, 2003. The Flyers traded the Kings' pick, Jim Vandermeer, and the rights to Colin Fraser to the Chicago Blackhawks for Alexei Zhamnov and the Blackhawks' fourth-round pick, 101st overall, on February 19, 2004.)
4	124	David Laliberte	Right wing	Canada	Prince Edward Island Rocket (QMJHL)	
5	144	Chris Zarb	Defense	United States	Tri-City Storm (USHL)	(Note: The Flyers traded Eric Chouinard to the Minnesota Wild for the Wild's fifth-round pick, 144th overall, on December 17, 2003.)
5	149	Gino Pisellini	Right wing	United States	Plymouth Whalers (OHL)	(Note: The Flyers traded Eric Weinrich to the St. Louis Blues for the Blues' fifth-round pick, 149th overall, on February 9, 2004.)
6	170	Ladislav Scurko	Center	Slovakia	Spišská Nová Ves (Slovakia)	(Note: The Flyers traded their 2003 seventh-round pick to the San Jose Sharks for the Florida Panthers' sixth-round pick, 170th overall, on June 22, 2003.)
6	171	Frederik Cabana	Center	Canada	Halifax Mooseheads (QMJHL)	(Note: The Flyers traded Marty Murray to the Carolina Hurricanes for the Hurricanes' sixth-round pick, 171st overall, on June 21, 2003.)
8	232	Martin Houle	Goaltender	Canada	Cape Breton Screaming Eagles (QMJHL)	(Note: The Flyers traded Chris Therien to the Dallas Stars for the Phoenix Coyotes' eight-round pick, 232nd overall, and the Stars' 2005 third-round pick on March 8, 2004.)
8	253	Travis Gawryletz	Defense	Canada	Trail Smoke Eaters (BCHL)	
9	286	Triston Grant	Left wing	Canada	Vancouver Giants (WHL)	
9	291	John Carter	Center	United States	Brewster Bulldogs (EmJHL)	(Note: The Flyers traded their 2003 eighth and ninth-round picks to the Tampa Bay Lightning for the Lightning's seventh, 227th overall, and ninth-round picks, 291st overall, on June 22, 2003. The Flyers traded the Lightning's seventh-round pick to the New York Islanders for Mattias Timander on January 22, 2004.)
