= List of Tampa Bay Lightning seasons =

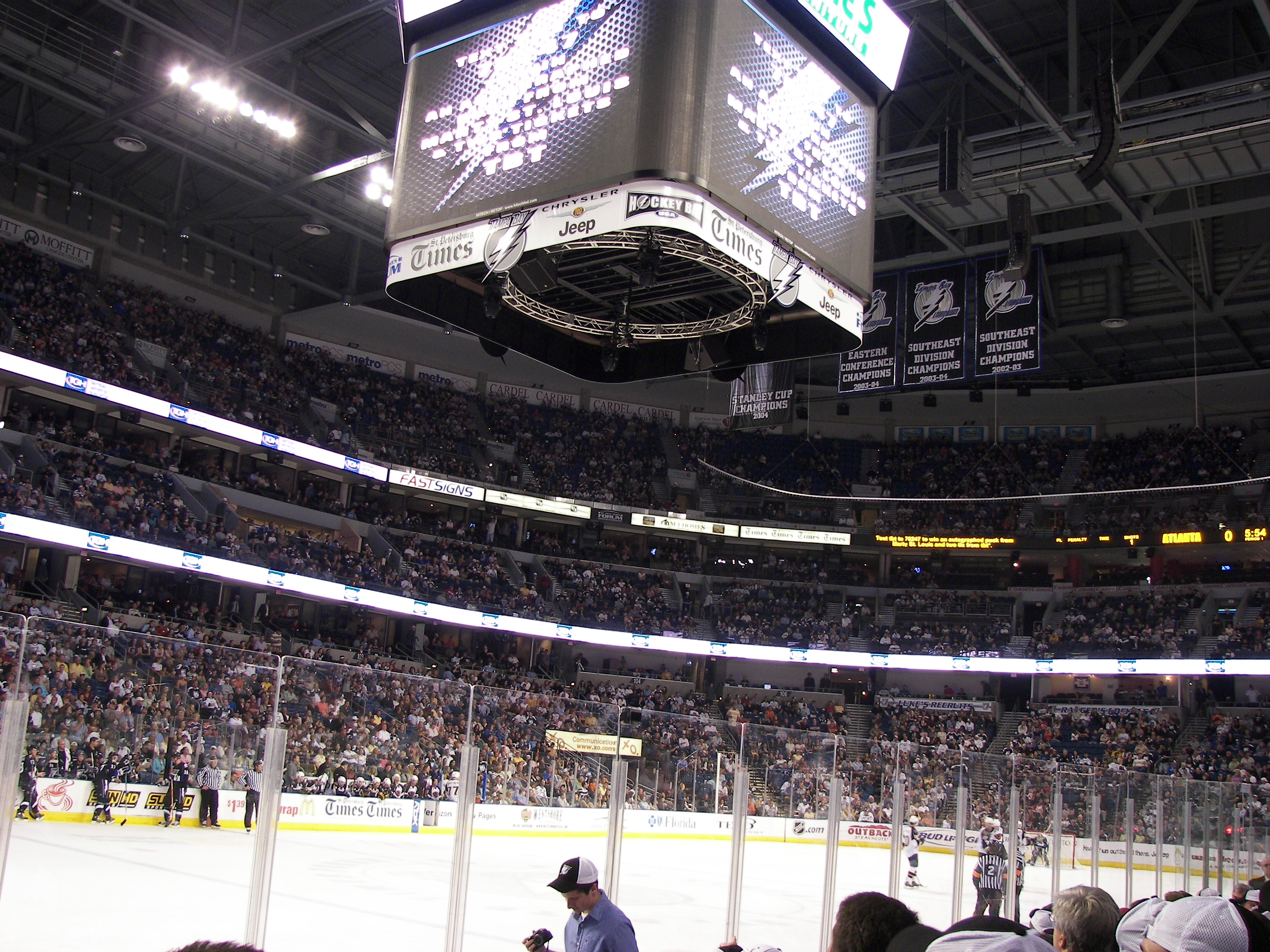
The interior of Benchmark International Arena (then named the St. Petersburg Times Forum) during a Lightning home game in 2007

The Tampa Bay Lightning are a professional ice hockey team based in Tampa, Florida. They are members of the Atlantic Division in the Eastern Conference of the National Hockey League (NHL). The Lightning were founded in 1992 as an expansion team in the Norris Division of the Campbell Conference. The next year, the Lightning were placed in the NHL's new Eastern Conference as members of the Atlantic Division. The Lightning were moved to the Southeast Division as part of the NHL's 1998 expansion to three divisions per conference. In 2013, as part of another realignment and return to a two division format, the Lightning became part of a reconstituted Atlantic Division. The Lightning played in Expo Hall for their inaugural season, and moved to Tropicana Field (then called the ThunderDome) for the 1993–94 season. They moved to their current home in 1996, the Ice Palace, which has since been renamed Benchmark International Arena.

The Lightning have qualified for the Stanley Cup playoffs thirteen times in twenty-eight completed seasons and won the Stanley Cup three times, once in 2004 and back-to-back in 2020 and 2021. The Tampa Bay Lightning have won over 1,000 regular season games, the 23rd-highest victory total among NHL teams. They have also lost 1,000 games during the regular season, the ninth-lowest loss total in the NHL. The Lightning have over 2,400 points in their 30 seasons, the tenth-lowest point total in the league.

Tampa Bay made their first playoffs in the 1995–96 season. The team's best year was the 2018–19 season, in which they finished 62–16–4. The team's worst year was the 1997–98 season, in which they finished 17–55–10. Tampa Bay moved to the Southeast Division in 1998, and won the division for the first time in the 2002–03 season. The Lightning won the Eastern Conference and their first Stanley Cup in the following season. As part of the 2013–14 NHL season realignment, the Lightning were relocated into the Atlantic Division after the league reduced from six divisions to four.

== Table key ==
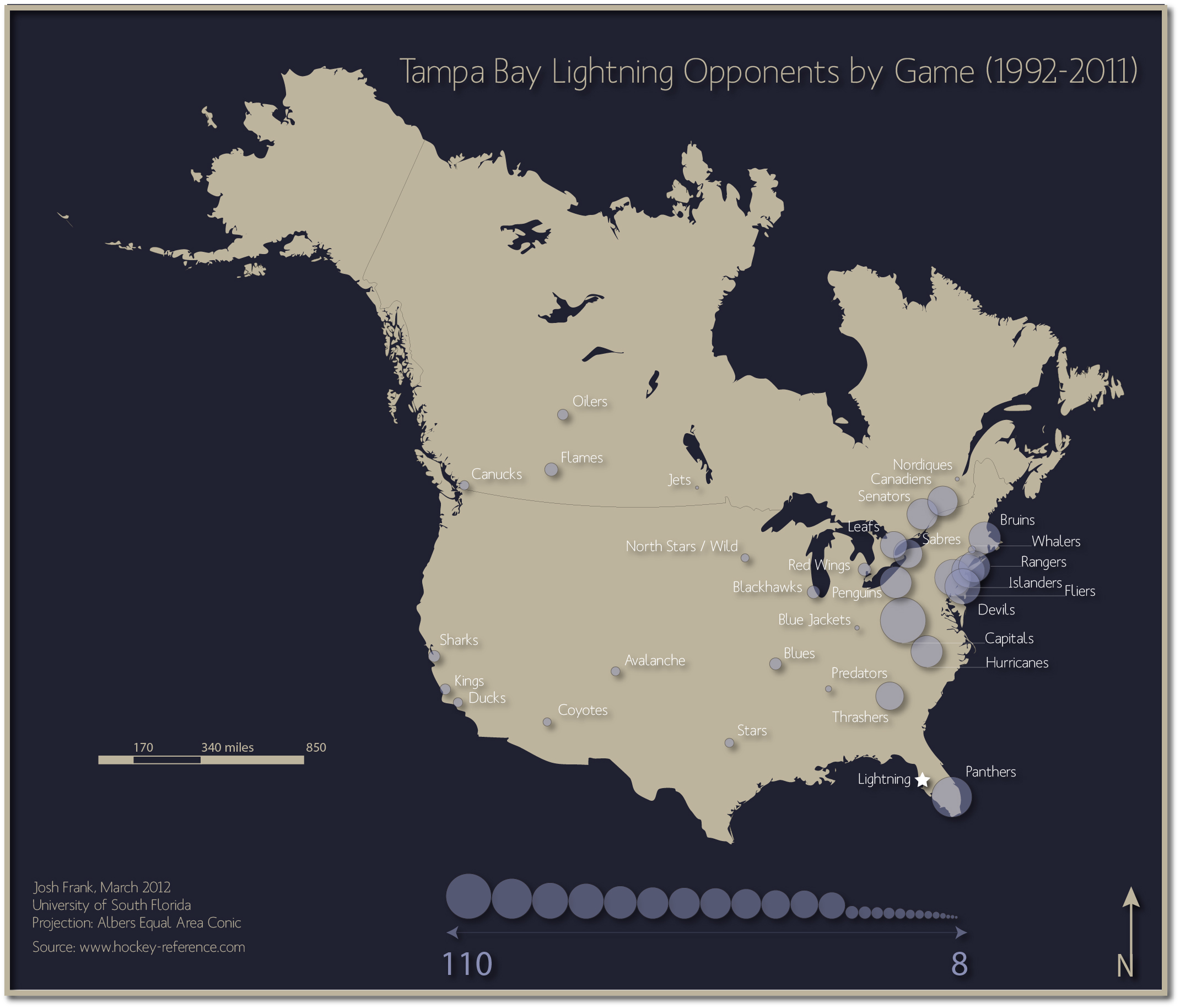
Tampa Bay Lightning opponents by city (1992–2011)

Key of colors and symbols
| Color/symbol | Explanation |
|---|---|
| † | Stanley Cup champions |
| ‡ | Conference champions |
| ↑ | Division champions |
| # | Led league in points |

Key of terms and abbreviations
| Term or abbreviation | Definition |
|---|---|
| Finish | Final position in division or league standings |
| GP | Number of games played |
| W | Number of wins |
| L | Number of losses |
| T | Number of ties |
| OT | Number of losses in overtime (since the 1999–2000 season) |
| Pts | Number of points |
| GF | Goals for (goals scored by the Lightning) |
| GA | Goals against (goals scored by the Lightning's opponents) |
| — | Does not apply |

== Year by year ==
Year by year listing of all seasons played by the Tampa Bay Lightning
| NHL season | Lightning season | Conference | Division | Regular season | | | | | | | | | Postseason | | | | | |
| NHL season | Lightning season | Conference | Division | Finish | GP | W | L | T | OT | Pts | GF | GA | GP | W | L | GF | GA | Result |
|---|---|---|---|---|---|---|---|---|---|---|---|---|---|---|---|---|---|---|
| 1992–93^{[a]} | 1992–93 | Campbell | Norris | 6th | 84 | 23 | 54 | 7 | — | 53 | 245 | 332 | — | — | — | — | — | Did not qualify |
| 1993–94 | 1993–94 | Eastern^{[b]} | Atlantic | 7th | 84 | 30 | 43 | 11 | — | 71 | 224 | 251 | — | — | — | — | — | Did not qualify |
| 1994–95^{[c]} | 1994–95 | Eastern | Atlantic | 6th | 48 | 17 | 28 | 3 | — | 37 | 120 | 144 | — | — | — | — | — | Did not qualify |
| 1995–96 | 1995–96 | Eastern | Atlantic | 5th | 82 | 38 | 32 | 12 | — | 88 | 238 | 248 | 6 | 2 | 4 | 13 | 26 | Lost conference quarterfinals to Philadelphia Flyers, 2–4 |
| 1996–97 | 1996–97 | Eastern | Atlantic | 6th | 82 | 32 | 40 | 10 | — | 74 | 217 | 247 | — | — | — | — | — | Did not qualify |
| 1997–98 | 1997–98 | Eastern | Atlantic | 7th | 82 | 17 | 55 | 10 | — | 44 | 151 | 269 | — | — | — | — | — | Did not qualify |
| 1998–99 | 1998–99 | Eastern | Southeast^{[d]} | 4th | 82 | 19 | 54 | 9 | — | 47 | 179 | 292 | — | — | — | — | — | Did not qualify |
| 1999–2000 | 1999–2000 | Eastern | Southeast | 4th | 82 | 19 | 47 | 9 | 7^{[e]} | 54 | 204 | 310 | — | — | — | — | — | Did not qualify |
| 2000–01 | 2000–01 | Eastern | Southeast | 5th | 82 | 24 | 47 | 6 | 5 | 59 | 201 | 280 | — | — | — | — | — | Did not qualify |
| 2001–02 | 2001–02 | Eastern | Southeast | 3rd | 82 | 27 | 40 | 11 | 4 | 69 | 178 | 219 | — | — | — | — | — | Did not qualify |
| 2002–03 | 2002–03 | Eastern | Southeast↑ | 1st | 82 | 36 | 25 | 16 | 5 | 93 | 219 | 210 | 11 | 5 | 6 | 22 | 29 | Won conference quarterfinals vs. Washington Capitals, 4–2; Lost conference semifinals to New Jersey Devils, 1–4 |
| 2003–04 | 2003–04 | Eastern‡ | Southeast↑ | 1st | 82 | 46 | 22 | 8 | 6 | 106 | 245 | 192 | 23 | 16 | 7 | 60 | 43 | Won conference quarterfinals vs. New York Islanders, 4–1; Won conference semifinals vs. Montreal Canadiens, 4–0; Won conference finals vs. Philadelphia Flyers, 4–3; Won Stanley Cup Final vs. Calgary Flames, 4–3† |
| 2004–05^{[f]} | 2004–05 | Eastern | Southeast | — | — | — | — | — | — | — | — | — | — | — | — | — | — | No playoffs due to lockout |
| 2005–06 | 2005–06 | Eastern | Southeast | 2nd | 82 | 43 | 33 | —^{[g]} | 6 | 92 | 252 | 260 | 5 | 1 | 4 | 13 | 23 | Lost conference quarterfinals to Ottawa Senators, 1–4 |
| 2006–07 | 2006–07 | Eastern | Southeast | 2nd | 82 | 44 | 33 | — | 5 | 93 | 253 | 261 | 6 | 2 | 4 | 14 | 19 | Lost conference quarterfinals to New Jersey Devils, 2–4 |
| 2007–08 | 2007–08 | Eastern | Southeast | 5th | 82 | 31 | 42 | — | 9 | 71 | 223 | 267 | — | — | — | — | — | Did not qualify |
| 2008–09 | 2008–09 | Eastern | Southeast | 5th | 82 | 24 | 40 | — | 18 | 66 | 210 | 279 | — | — | — | — | — | Did not qualify |
| 2009–10 | 2009–10 | Eastern | Southeast | 3rd | 82 | 34 | 36 | — | 12 | 80 | 217 | 260 | — | — | — | — | — | Did not qualify |
| 2010–11 | 2010–11 | Eastern | Southeast | 2nd | 82 | 46 | 25 | — | 11 | 103 | 247 | 240 | 18 | 11 | 7 | 59 | 45 | Won conference quarterfinals vs. Pittsburgh Penguins, 4–3; Won conference semifinals vs. Washington Capitals, 4–0; Lost conference finals to Boston Bruins, 3–4 |
| 2011–12 | 2011–12 | Eastern | Southeast | 3rd | 82 | 38 | 36 | — | 8 | 84 | 235 | 281 | — | — | — | — | — | Did not qualify |
| 2012–13^{[h]} | 2012–13 | Eastern | Southeast | 4th | 48 | 18 | 26 | — | 4 | 40 | 148 | 150 | — | — | — | — | — | Did not qualify |
| 2013–14 | 2013–14 | Eastern | Atlantic^{[i]} | 2nd | 82 | 46 | 27 | — | 9 | 101 | 240 | 215 | 4 | 0 | 4 | 10 | 16 | Lost first round to Montreal Canadiens, 0–4 |
| 2014–15 | 2014–15 | Eastern‡ | Atlantic | 2nd | 82 | 50 | 24 | — | 8 | 108 | 262 | 211 | 26 | 14 | 12 | 65 | 62 | Won first round vs. Detroit Red Wings, 4–3; Won second round vs. Montreal Canadiens, 4–2; Won conference finals vs. New York Rangers, 4–3; Lost Stanley Cup Final to Chicago Blackhawks, 2–4 |
| 2015–16 | 2015–16 | Eastern | Atlantic | 2nd | 82 | 46 | 31 | — | 5 | 97 | 227 | 201 | 17 | 11 | 6 | 48 | 40 | Won first round vs. Detroit Red Wings, 4–1; Won second round vs. New York Islanders, 4–1; Lost conference finals to Pittsburgh Penguins, 3–4 |
| 2016–17 | 2016–17 | Eastern | Atlantic | 5th | 82 | 42 | 30 | — | 10 | 94 | 234 | 227 | — | — | — | — | — | Did not qualify |
| 2017–18 | 2017–18 | Eastern | Atlantic↑ | 1st | 82 | 54 | 23 | — | 5 | 113 | 296 | 236 | 17 | 11 | 6 | 50 | 48 | Won first round vs. New Jersey Devils, 4–1; Won second round vs. Boston Bruins, 4–1; Lost conference finals to Washington Capitals, 3–4 |
| 2018–19 | 2018–19 | Eastern | Atlantic↑ | 1st | 82 | 62 | 16 | — | 4 | 128# | 325 | 222 | 4 | 0 | 4 | 8 | 19 | Lost first round to Columbus Blue Jackets, 0–4 |
| 2019–20^{[j]} | 2019–20 | Eastern‡ | Atlantic | 2nd | 70 | 43 | 21 | — | 6 | 92 | 245 | 195 | 25 | 18 | 7 | 78 | 57 | Finished second in seeding round-robin (2–1); Won first round vs. Columbus Blue Jackets, 4–1; Won second round vs. Boston Bruins, 4–1; Won conference finals vs. New York Islanders, 4–2; Won Stanley Cup Final vs. Dallas Stars, 4–2† |
| 2020–21^{[k]} | 2020–21 | — | Central | 3rd | 56 | 36 | 17 | — | 3 | 75 | 181 | 147 | 23 | 16 | 7 | 75 | 45 | Won first round vs. Florida Panthers, 4–2; Won second round vs. Carolina Hurricanes, 4–1; Won Stanley Cup semifinals vs. New York Islanders, 4–3; Won Stanley Cup Final vs. Montreal Canadiens, 4–1† |
| 2021–22 | 2021–22 | Eastern‡ | Atlantic | 3rd | 82 | 51 | 23 | — | 8 | 110 | 287 | 233 | 23 | 14 | 9 | 67 | 61 | Won first round vs. Toronto Maple Leafs, 4–3; Won second round vs. Florida Panthers, 4–0; Won conference finals vs. New York Rangers, 4–2; Lost Stanley Cup Final to Colorado Avalanche, 2–4 |
| 2022–23 | 2022–23 | Eastern | Atlantic | 3rd | 82 | 46 | 30 | — | 6 | 98 | 283 | 254 | 6 | 2 | 4 | 21 | 23 | Lost first round to Toronto Maple Leafs, 2–4 |
| 2023–24 | 2023–24 | Eastern | Atlantic | 4th | 82 | 45 | 29 | — | 8 | 98 | 291 | 268 | 5 | 1 | 4 | 14 | 20 | Lost first round to Florida Panthers, 1–4 |
| 2024–25 | 2024–25 | Eastern | Atlantic | 2nd | 82 | 47 | 27 | — | 8 | 102 | 294 | 219 | 5 | 1 | 4 | 12 | 19 | Lost first round to Florida Panthers, 1–4 |
| 2025–26 | 2025–26 | Eastern | Atlantic | 2nd | 82 | 50 | 26 | — | 6 | 106 | 290 | 231 | 7 | 3 | 4 | 15 | 16 | Lost first round to Montreal Canadiens, 3–4 |
| Totals^{l} | | | | | 2,604 | 1,224 | 1,082 | 112 | 186 | 2,746 | 7,661 | 7,851 | 231 | 128 | 103 | 644 | 611 | Playoff series record: 25–15 |

== Notes ==
- ^{a} In 1992, the NHL expanded the season to 84 games, and each team played two games at a neutral site. After the 1995 lockout, the neutral site games were eliminated, and the season was reduced to 82 games.
- ^{b} The NHL realigned into Eastern and Western conferences prior to the 1993–94 season. Tampa Bay was placed in the Atlantic Division of the Eastern Conference.
- ^{c} The season was shortened to 48 games because of the 1994–95 NHL lockout.
- ^{d} The NHL added 4 expansion teams prior to the 1998–99 season and split the Eastern Conference into three divisions: Northeast, Atlantic, and Southeast. Tampa Bay was moved into the new Southeast division.
- ^{e} Beginning with the 1999–2000 season, teams received one point for losing a regular season game in overtime.
- ^{f} The season was canceled because of the 2004–05 NHL lockout.
- ^{g} Before the 2005–06 season, the NHL instituted a penalty shootout for regular season games that remained tied after a five-minute overtime period, which prevented ties.
- ^{h} The season was shortened to 48 games because of the 2012–13 NHL lockout.
- ^{i} The NHL realigned prior to the 2013–14 season. Tampa Bay was placed in the Atlantic Division of the Eastern Conference.
- ^{j} The regular season was cut short, and the playoffs were modified as a result of the COVID-19 pandemic.
- ^{k} The season was shortened to 56 games because of the COVID-19 pandemic.
- ^{l} Totals as of completion of 2025–26 season.
