= 2004–05 New Jersey Devils season =

National Hockey League season

2004–05 New Jersey Devils
- Division: Atlantic
- Conference: Eastern
- 2004–05 record: Did not play

Team information
- General manager: Lou Lamoriello
- Coach: Pat Burns
- Captain: Scott Stevens
- Arena: Continental Airlines Arena
- Minor league affiliate: Albany River Rats

The 2004–05 New Jersey Devils season was the 31st season for the National Hockey League (NHL) franchise that was established on June 11, 1974, and 23rd season since the franchise relocated from Colorado prior to the 1982–83 NHL season. However, the 2004–05 NHL lockout prevented the season's games from occurring.

== NHL lockout ==
Devils general manager Lou Lamoriello sat on the negotiating committee for the league, although he had little to say early on in the proceedings. However, he was invited to a January meeting by the players' union in an attempt to breach sides; Lamoriello was invited because of the respect for the manner in which he ran the Devils organization. That meeting was ultimately unfruitful, although it did lead to further talks between the players and the owners. As late as February 2005, Lamoriello showed hope the season could be salvaged.

They're trying to do everything humanly possible to try to get the game back on the ice... If there is reason to believe that there is hope and a chance, then I think you use that time. We have to have some patience.

He later added:

Maybe I'm from the old school. But I believe we should lock ourselves in a room and not come out until we've made a deal – or announced that we can't. I've said all along, until someone tells me it's over, it's not. It's too easy to be negative. There's no question we have something scheduled at this point for (tomorrow) Wednesday. It's looking very bleak right now. But it's not over.

Lamoriello praised the final decision, saying it put everyone on "level footing" and created more parity in the league.

Meanwhile, during the stoppage Devils' center Scott Gomez went home to Anchorage, Alaska, to play for the Alaska Aces of the ECHL. He went on to lead the league in scoring, netting 86 points in only 68 games, en route to winning the league's Most Valuable Player award.

== Schedule ==
The Devils regular season schedule was announced on July 14, 2004. Their preseason schedule was announced on July 19, 2004.

2004–05 schedule
Preseason

Game	Date	Opponent
1	September 28	New York Rangers
2	September 30	@ New York Rangers
3	October 1	@ New York Islanders
4	October 6	@ Philadelphia Flyers
5	October 8	New York Islanders
6	October 9	Philadelphia Flyers

Regular season

Game	Date	Opponent
1	October 15	Toronto Maple Leafs
2	October 16	@ Buffalo Sabres
3	October 20	New York Islanders
4	October 23	Detroit Red Wings
5	October 26	@ New York Islanders
6	October 29	St. Louis Blues
7	October 30	@ Ottawa Senators
8	November 2	@ Philadelphia Flyers
9	November 3	@ Washington Capitals
10	November 6	Tampa Bay Lightning
11	November 8	@ Atlanta Thrashers
12	November 10	Nashville Predators
13	November 12	Dallas Stars
14	November 13	@ Washington Capitals
15	November 16	Ottawa Senators
16	November 18	Toronto Maple Leafs
17	November 20	Pittsburgh Penguins
18	November 22	@ Pittsburgh Penguins
19	November 24	@ Florida Panthers
20	November 26	@ Tampa Bay Lightning
21	November 27	Atlanta Thrashers
22	December 1	New York Rangers
23	December 3	Montreal Canadiens
24	December 4	@ New York Rangers
25	December 7	Buffalo Sabres
26	December 9	@ Minnesota Wild
27	December 11	New York Rangers
28	December 12	@ Chicago Blackhawks
29	December 15	Tampa Bay Lightning
30	December 17	Montreal Canadiens
31	December 18	@ Montreal Canadiens
32	December 21	@ Carolina Hurricanes
33	December 23	New York Islanders
34	December 27	@ Florida Panthers
35	December 29	@ Tampa Bay Lightning
36	December 31	Anaheim Mighty Ducks
37	January 4	Atlanta Thrashers
38	January 6	@ New York Islanders
39	January 8	@ Toronto Maple Leafs
40	January 10	Minnesota Wild
41	January 12	Colorado Avalanche
42	January 14	Boston Bruins
43	January 15	@ Boston Bruins
44	January 18	Philadelphia Flyers
45	January 20	@ New York Rangers
46	January 22	Carolina Hurricanes
47	January 25	@ Vancouver Canucks
48	January 28	@ Edmonton Oilers
49	January 29	@ Calgary Flames
50	February 2	Los Angeles Kings
51	February 3	@ Buffalo Sabres
52	February 5	@ Philadelphia Flyers
53	February 8	Florida Panthers
54	February 10	New York Rangers
55	February 15	Pittsburgh Penguins
56	February 17	@ Philadelphia Flyers
57	February 19	Carolina Hurricanes
58	February 20	@ Nashville Predators
59	February 23	@ Detroit Red Wings
60	February 24	@ Toronto Maple Leafs
61	February 26	New York Islanders
62	February 28	Columbus Blue Jackets
63	March 2	Boston Bruins
64	March 4	Washington Capitals
65	March 5	@ Ottawa Senators
66	March 7	Philadelphia Flyers
67	March 10	@ San Jose Sharks
68	March 12	@ Phoenix Coyotes
69	March 16	@ New York Rangers
70	March 17	Atlanta Thrashers
71	March 19	Philadelphia Flyers
72	March 21	Buffalo Sabres
73	March 24	@ Pittsburgh Penguins
74	March 26	@ New York Islanders
75	March 27	Pittsburgh Penguins
76	March 29	Ottawa Senators
77	March 31	@ Carolina Hurricanes
78	April 2	@ Boston Bruins
79	April 4	@ Montreal Canadiens
80	April 6	Florida Panthers
81	April 8	@ Pittsburgh Penguins
82	April 9	Washington Capitals

== Transactions ==
The Devils were involved in the following transactions from June 8, 2004, the day after the deciding game of the 2004 Stanley Cup Finals, through February 16, 2005, the day the 2004–05 season was officially cancelled.

=== Trades ===
Date	Details		Ref
June 26, 2004	To New Jersey Devils: 1st-round pick in 2004	To Dallas Stars: 1st-round pick in 2004; 3rd-round pick in 2004	

=== Players acquired ===
Date	Player	Former team	Term	Via	Ref
July 3, 2004	Darren Langdon	Montreal Canadiens	2-year	Free agency	
July 12, 2004	Richard Matvichuk	Dallas Stars	4-year	Free agency	
July 15, 2004	Krzysztof Oliwa	Calgary Flames		Free agency	
August 13, 2004	Bobby Allen	Edmonton Oilers		Free agency	
August 13, 2004	Pascal Rheaume	St. Louis Blues		Free agency	
August 13, 2004	Ray Schultz	Nashville Predators		Free agency	
August 13, 2004	Steven Spencer	South Carolina Stingrays (ECHL)		Free agency	

=== Players lost ===
Date	Player	New team	Via (Note: In parentheses is the player's free agency group on July 1 if applicable.)	Ref
July 1, 2004	Greg Crozier (Note: Crozier retired.)		Contract expiration (VI)	
July 1, 2004	Joe Hulbig (Note: Hulbig retired.)		Contract expiration (VI)	
July 1, 2004	Corey Schwab (Note: Schwab was inactive during the 2004–05 season and retired on August 10, 2005.)		Contract expiration (III)	
July 3, 2004	Turner Stevenson	Philadelphia Flyers	Free agency (III)	
July 7, 2004	Raymond Giroux	Minnesota Wild	Free agency (VI)	
July 19, 2004	Craig Darby	Tampa Bay Lightning	Free agency (UFA)	
July 28, 2004	Maxim Balmochnykh	HC Lipetsk (RUS-2)	Free agency (VI)	
July 29, 2004	Tommy Albelin		Retirement (III)	
August 9, 2004	Steve Kariya	Ilves (Liiga)	Free agency (VI)	
September 2004	Mike Matteucci	Milwaukee Admirals (AHL)	Free agency (VI)	
September 28, 2004	Chris Hartsburg	Colorado Eagles (CHL)	Free agency (UFA)	

=== Signings ===
Date	Player	Term	Contract type	Ref
June 29, 2004	Ivan Khomutov		Entry-level	
July 1, 2004	John Madden	5-year	Re-signing	
July 1, 2004	Jay Pandolfo	4-year	Re-signing	
July 7, 2004	Grant Marshall	multi-year	Re-signing	
July 8, 2004	Jeff Friesen	1-year	Re-signing	
July 15, 2004	Viktor Kozlov	1-year	Re-signing	
August 10, 2004	Scott Gomez	1-year	Arbitration award	
August 12, 2004	Brian Rafalski	1-year	Re-signing	
August 13, 2004	Ari Ahonen		Re-signing	
August 13, 2004	Scott Clemmensen		Re-signing	
August 13, 2004	Brett Clouthier		Re-signing	
August 13, 2004	Ryan Murphy		Re-signing	
August 13, 2004	Scott Niedermayer	1-year	Arbitration award	
August 19, 2004	Sergei Brylin	multi-year	Re-signing	

== Draft picks ==
The Devils' draft picks at the 2004 NHL entry draft in Raleigh, North Carolina.

Rd #	Pick #	Player	Nat	Pos	Team (League)	Notes
1	20	Travis Zajac	Canada	C	Salmon Arm Silverbacks (BCHL)	(Note: The Devils acquired the 2004 first-round pick from Dallas in exchange for the Devils' 2004 first-round pick (later transferred to San Jose and used on Lukas Kaspar) and the 2004 third-round pick (later transferred to Washington and used on Clayton Barthel) on June 26, 2004.)
2	57	No second-round pick				(Note: The Devils traded their 2004 second-round pick (later transferred to Edmonton and used on Geoff Paukovich), along with Mike Rupp to Phoenix for Jan Hrdina on March 5, 2004.)
3	88	No third-round pick				
4	121	No fourth-round pick				(Note: The Devils traded their 2004 fourth-round pick (later transferred to Calgary and used on Kris Hogg) to Columbus for Grant Marshall on March 10, 2003.)
5	155	Alexander Mikhailishin	Russia	D	Spartak St. Petersburg (Vysshaya Liga)	
6	185	Josh Disher	Canada	G	Erie Otters (OHL)	
7	216	Pierre-Luc Letourneau-Leblond	Canada	RW	Baie-Comeau Drakkar (QMJHL)	(Note: Compensatory selection received from the NHL as compensation for Group III free agent Jim McKenzie signing with the Nashville Predators on July 22, 2003.)
7	217	Tyler Eckford	Canada	D	Surrey Eagles (BCHL)	
8	250	Nathan Perkovich	United States	RW	Cedar Rapids RoughRiders (USHL)	
9	282	Valeri Klimov	Russia	D	Spartak St. Petersburg (Vysshaya Liga)	

== Farm teams ==
The Albany River Rats, the Devils' American Hockey League affiliate, finished in last place in their division during the 2004–05 AHL season, and failed to make the playoffs for the fifth straight season. Veteran Dean McAmmond led the team in scoring with 61 points, while right on his heels was hot rookie Zach Parise with 58. Meanwhile, goaltenders Scott Clemmensen and Ari Ahonen split the load evenly, although Ahonen had more wins in fewer games played. Parise and Clemmensen would go on to make the Devils' squad full-time the following season.
