= 2004–05 Toronto Maple Leafs season =

NHL hockey team season

2004–05 Toronto Maple Leafs
- Division: Northeast
- Conference: Eastern
- 2004–05 record: Did not play

Team information
- General manager: John Ferguson, Jr.
- Coach: Pat Quinn
- Captain: Mats Sundin
- Alternate captains: Bryan McCabe; Gary Roberts
- Arena: Air Canada Centre
- Minor league affiliates: St. John's Maple Leafs; Pensacola Ice Pilots

The 2004–05 Toronto Maple Leafs season was the 88th season of the franchise, 78th season as the Maple Leafs. The entire season's games were cancelled as a result of the 2004–05 NHL lockout.

== Offseason ==
Key dates prior to the start of the season:

- The 2004 NHL entry draft took place in Raleigh, North Carolina, on June 26-27, 2004.
- The free agency period began on July 1.

== Schedule ==
The Maple Leafs preseason and regular season schedules were announced on July 14, 2004.

2004–05 schedule
Preseason

Game	Date	Opponent
1	September 24	@ Montreal Canadiens
2	September 25	@ Ottawa Senators
3	September 28	Buffalo Sabres
4	October 1	@ Detroit Red Wings
5	October 2	Ottawa Senators
6	October 5	Montreal Canadiens
7	October 8	@ Buffalo Sabres
8	October 9	Detroit Red Wings

Regular season

Game	Date	Opponent
1	October 15	@ New Jersey Devils
2	October 16	Ottawa Senators
3	October 19	Florida Panthers
4	October 21	@ Ottawa Senators
5	October 23	@ Montreal Canadiens
6	October 26	Los Angeles Kings
7	October 29	@ Carolina Hurricanes
8	October 30	New York Rangers
9	November 2	Tampa Bay Lightning
10	November 6	Boston Bruins
11	November 9	@ New York Islanders
12	November 11	@ New York Rangers
13	November 13	@ Boston Bruins
14	November 15	@ Buffalo Sabres
15	November 16	Dallas Stars
16	November 18	@ New Jersey Devils
17	November 20	Philadelphia Flyers
18	November 23	Washington Capitals
19	November 27	Buffalo Sabres
20	November 30	@ Calgary Flames
21	December 2	@ Edmonton Oilers
22	December 4	@ Vancouver Canucks
23	December 7	Boston Bruins
24	December 9	@ Columbus Blue Jackets
25	December 11	Montreal Canadiens
26	December 13	@ Buffalo Sabres
27	December 14	New York Islanders
28	December 16	Atlanta Thrashers
29	December 18	Calgary Flames
30	December 21	@ Boston Bruins
31	December 23	@ Carolina Hurricanes
32	December 27	@ Colorado Avalanche
33	December 28	@ St. Louis Blues
34	December 30	@ Nashville Predators
35	January 1	@ Boston Bruins
36	January 4	Boston Bruins
37	January 6	@ Atlanta Thrashers
38	January 8	New Jersey Devils
39	January 10	@ Ottawa Senators
40	January 11	Pittsburgh Penguins
41	January 14	@ Chicago Blackhawks
42	January 15	@ Detroit Red Wings
43	January 18	New York Islanders
44	January 20	@ Ottawa Senators
45	January 22	@ Montreal Canadiens
46	January 24	Carolina Hurricanes
47	January 26	@ Florida Panthers
48	January 27	@ Tampa Bay Lightning
49	January 29	Ottawa Senators
50	February 1	@ Buffalo Sabres
51	February 3	Washington Capitals
52	February 5	Vancouver Canucks
53	February 7	San Jose Sharks
54	February 8	@ New York Rangers
55	February 10	Pittsburgh Penguins
56	February 15	Carolina Hurricanes
57	February 18	Buffalo Sabres
58	February 19	Edmonton Oilers
59	February 22	Florida Panthers
60	February 24	New Jersey Devils
61	February 26	Atlanta Thrashers
62	March 1	@ Tampa Bay Lightning
63	March 2	@ Florida Panthers
64	March 5	Montreal Canadiens
65	March 8	Philadelphia Flyers
66	March 10	@ Philadelphia Flyers
67	March 12	Ottawa Senators
68	March 13	@ Pittsburgh Penguins
69	March 15	Anaheim Mighty Ducks
70	March 17	Minnesota Wild
71	March 19	New York Rangers
72	March 20	@ Washington Capitals
73	March 22	Phoenix Coyotes
74	March 25	@ Atlanta Thrashers
75	March 26	@ Philadelphia Flyers
76	March 28	Tampa Bay Lightning
77	March 31	@ Montreal Canadiens
78	April 2	Montreal Canadiens
79	April 3	@ Pittsburgh Penguins
80	April 5	@ New York Islanders
81	April 8	@ Washington Capitals
82	April 9	Buffalo Sabres

== Transactions ==
The Maple Leafs were involved in the following transactions from June 8, 2004, the day after the deciding game of the 2004 Stanley Cup Finals, through February 16, 2005, the day the 2004–05 season was officially cancelled.

=== Trades ===
The Maple Leafs did not make any trades.

=== Players acquired ===
Date	Player	Former team	Term	Via	Ref
July 28, 2004	Jason MacDonald	New York Rangers	1-year	Free agency	

=== Players lost ===
Date	Player	New team	Via (Note: In parentheses is the player’s free agency group on July 1 if applicable.)	Ref
July 1, 2004	Ron Francis (Note: Francis was inactive during the 2004–05 season and announced his retirement on September 14, 2005.)		Contract expiration (III)	
July 1, 2004	Calle Johansson (Note: Johansson retired.)		Contract expiration (III)	
July 1, 2004	Bryan Marchment (Note: Marchment was inactive during the 2004–05 season.)		Contract expiration (III)	
July 12, 2004	Mike Minard	Manitoba Moose (AHL)	Free agency (VI)	
July 28, 2004	Tom Fitzgerald	Boston Bruins	Free agency (III)	
August 19, 2004	Robert Reichel	HC Litvinov (ELH)	Free agency (III)	
September 7, 2004	Sebastien Centomo	Calgary Flames	Free agency (UFA)	
September 18, 2004	Pierre Hedin	Modo Hockey (SHL)	Free agency (Note: Hedin had two years remaining on a three-year contract. The Maple Leafs retained his NHL rights through the 2006–07 season.)	
September 19, 2004	Josh Holden	HPK (Liiga)	Free agency (VI)	
October 7, 2004	Christian Chartier	Las Vegas Wranglers (ECHL)	Free agency (UFA)	
November 2, 2004	Aaron Gavey	Storhamar Dragons (Norway)	Free agency (UFA)	
December 10, 2004	Jamie Hodson	Fresno Falcons (ECHL)	Free agency (UFA)	
December 22, 2004	Drake Berehowsky	Skelleftea AIK (Allsvenskan)	Free agency (III)	
January 31, 2005	Trevor Kidd	Orebro HK (SWE-3)	Free agency (III)	

=== Signings ===
Date	Player	Term	Contract type	Ref
June 18, 2004	Ken Klee	2-year	Re-signing	
June 18, 2004	Darcy Tucker	3-year	Re-signing	
June 30, 2004	Ed Belfour	3-year	Re-signing	
June 30, 2004	Aki Berg	1-year	Re-signing	
June 30, 2004	Marc Moro	2-year	Re-signing	
June 30, 2004	Joe Nieuwendyk	1-year	Re-signing	
June 30, 2004	Gary Roberts	1-year	Re-signing	
August 5, 2004	Nik Antropov	1-year	Re-signing	
August 5, 2004	Bryan McCabe	2-year	Re-signing	
August 6, 2004	Mikael Tellqvist	2-year	Re-signing	
August 6, 2004	Clarke Wilm	1-year	Re-signing	
August 10, 2004	Tomas Kaberle	2-year	Re-signing	

== Draft picks ==
The 2004 NHL entry draft was the 42nd NHL entry draft.

- Toronto's picks at the 2004 NHL entry draft in Raleigh, North Carolina.

Round	#	Player	Position	Nationality	College/Junior/Club team (League)
3	90	Justin Pogge	Goaltender	Canada	Prince George Cougars (WHL)
4	113	Roman Kukumberg	Right wing	Slovakia	Dukla Trencin (Extraliga)
5	157	Dmitry Vorobyov	Defenceman	Russia	Lada Togliatti (RSL)
6	187	Robbie Earl	Left wing	United States	University of Wisconsin (Big Ten)
7	220	Maxim Semenov	Defenceman	Russia	Lada Togliatti (RSL)
8	252	Jan Steber	Centre	Czech Republic	Halifax Mooseheads (QMJHL)
9	285	Pierce Norton	Right wing	United States	Thayer Academy (USHS-MA)

== Farm teams ==
- The Maple Leafs' top affiliate was the St. John's Maple Leafs in the American Hockey League. This was the last season this team played in St. John's before it relocated as the Toronto Marlies.
- The Maple Leafs' secondary affiliate was the Pensacola Ice Pilots in the ECHL.
