= 2004–05 San Jose Sharks season =

National Hockey League team season

2004–05 San Jose Sharks
- Division: Pacific
- Conference: Western
- 2004–05 record: Did not play

Team information
- General manager: Doug Wilson
- Coach: Ron Wilson
- Captain: Patrick Marleau
- Arena: HP Pavilion
- Minor league affiliates: Cleveland Barons; Fresno Falcons; Johnstown Chiefs

The 2004–05 San Jose Sharks season was the Sharks 14th season in the National Hockey League. Its games were cancelled due to the 2004–05 NHL lockout.

== Schedule ==
The Sharks regular season schedule was announced on July 14, 2004. Their preseason schedule was released on August 12, 2004.

2004–05 schedule
Preseason

Game	Date	Opponent
1	September 25	Phoenix Coyotes
2	September 29	@ Anaheim Mighty Ducks
3	September 30	Vancouver Canucks
4	October 2	Anaheim Mighty Ducks
5	October 6	Los Angeles Kings
6	October 7	@ Vancouver Canucks
7	October 9	@ Phoenix Coyotes

Regular season

Game	Date	Opponent
1	October 13	Vancouver Canucks
2	October 15	@ Anaheim Mighty Ducks
3	October 16	Colorado Avalanche
4	October 19	@ Columbus Blue Jackets
5	October 21	@ Nashville Predators
6	October 23	@ Boston Bruins
7	October 25	@ New York Rangers
8	October 26	@ Pittsburgh Penguins
9	October 28	@ Buffalo Sabres
10	October 30	@ St. Louis Blues
11	November 3	Phoenix Coyotes
12	November 6	Atlanta Thrashers
13	November 11	Minnesota Wild
14	November 13	Vancouver Canucks
15	November 17	Detroit Red Wings
16	November 20	Florida Panthers
17	November 22	@ Phoenix Coyotes
18	November 24	Chicago Blackhawks
19	November 26	@ Dallas Stars
20	November 27	@ Nashville Predators
21	November 29	@ Detroit Red Wings
22	December 2	Dallas Stars
23	December 4	Washington Capitals
24	December 7	Phoenix Coyotes
25	December 9	Edmonton Oilers
26	December 11	Carolina Hurricanes
27	December 13	@ Dallas Stars
28	December 15	@ Chicago Blackhawks
29	December 16	@ Minnesota Wild
30	December 18	Nashville Predators
31	December 22	Phoenix Coyotes
32	December 26	Los Angeles Kings
33	December 27	@ Los Angeles Kings
34	December 30	Minnesota Wild
35	December 31	@ Phoenix Coyotes
36	January 2	@ Edmonton Oilers
37	January 3	@ Calgary Flames
38	January 6	Dallas Stars
39	January 8	Tampa Bay Lightning
40	January 10	@ Vancouver Canucks
41	January 11	@ Edmonton Oilers
42	January 13	Los Angeles Kings
43	January 15	St. Louis Blues
44	January 17	Edmonton Oilers
45	January 19	@ Anaheim Mighty Ducks
46	January 20	Columbus Blue Jackets
47	January 22	@ Colorado Avalanche
48	January 25	@ Minnesota Wild
49	January 27	@ Los Angeles Kings
50	January 28	Dallas Stars
51	January 30	Nashville Predators
52	February 1	@ Calgary Flames
53	February 3	@ Montreal Canadiens
54	February 5	@ Ottawa Senators
55	February 7	@ Toronto Maple Leafs
56	February 8	@ Columbus Blue Jackets
57	February 10	@ Philadelphia Flyers
58	February 15	@ Vancouver Canucks
59	February 17	Calgary Flames
60	February 19	Boston Bruins
61	February 21	@ St. Louis Blues
62	February 24	@ New York Islanders
63	February 26	@ Detroit Red Wings
64	February 27	@ Chicago Blackhawks
65	March 1	Anaheim Mighty Ducks
66	March 3	Buffalo Sabres
67	March 6	@ Colorado Avalanche
68	March 8	@ Anaheim Mighty Ducks
69	March 10	New Jersey Devils
70	March 12	Chicago Blackhawks
71	March 13	New York Rangers
72	March 17	St. Louis Blues
73	March 19	Detroit Red Wings
74	March 24	Anaheim Mighty Ducks
75	March 26	Columbus Blue Jackets
76	March 28	Colorado Avalanche
77	March 30	@ Los Angeles Kings
78	March 31	Los Angeles Kings
79	April 2	@ Phoenix Coyotes
80	April 4	@ Dallas Stars
81	April 7	Calgary Flames
82	April 9	Anaheim Mighty Ducks

== Transactions ==
The Sharks were involved in the following transactions from June 8, 2004, the day after the deciding game of the 2004 Stanley Cup Finals, through February 16, 2005, the day the 2004–05 season was officially cancelled.

=== Trades ===
Date	Details		Ref
June 26, 2004	To San Jose Sharks: 1st-round pick in 2004; 5th-round pick in 2004	To Dallas Stars: 1st-round pick in 2004; 2nd-round pick in 2004; 3rd-round pick in 2004	
June 26, 2004	To San Jose Sharks: 3rd-round pick in 2004; 4th-round pick in 2004; 9th-round pick in 2004	To Boston Bruins: 2nd-round pick in 2004	
June 27, 2004	To San Jose Sharks: 7th-round pick in 2004; 8th-round pick in 2004	To Florida Panthers: 5th-round pick in 2004	

=== Players acquired ===
Date	Player	Former team	Term	Via	Ref
June 27, 2004	Scott Ford	Brown University (ECAC)		Free agency	
June 27, 2004	Aaron Gill	Cleveland Barons (AHL)		Free agency	
June 27, 2004	Shane Joseph	Cleveland Barons (AHL)		Free agency	
September 15, 2004	Riley Armstrong	Everett Silvertips (WHL)		Free agency	

=== Players lost ===
Date	Player	New team	Via (Note: In parentheses is the player's free agency group on July 1 if applicable.)	Ref
July 1, 2004	Willie Levesque (Note: Levesque retired after being released from Providence Bruins training camp on October 1, 2004.)		Contract expiration (UFA)	
July 2, 2004	Curtis Brown	Chicago Blackhawks	Free agency (UFA)	
July 9, 2004	Mike Ricci	Phoenix Coyotes	Free agency (III)	
July 20, 2004	Robert Mulick	HC Bolzano (Serie A)	Free agency (UFA)	
August 1, 2004	Tavis Hansen	Oji Eagles (ALIH)	Free agency (VI)	
August 11, 2004	Jesse Fibiger	Ottawa Senators	Free agency (VI)	
August 18, 2004	Vincent Damphousse	Colorado Avalanche	Free agency (III)	
August 25, 2004	Jason Marshall	New York Rangers	Free agency (III)	
August 31, 2004	Seamus Kotyk	Milwaukee Admirals (AHL)	Free agency (UFA)	
September 15, 2004	Todd Harvey	Edmonton Oilers	Free agency (UFA)	
October 8, 2004	Yuri Moscevsky	Long Beach Ice Dogs (ECHL)	Free agency (UFA)	

=== Signings ===
Date	Player	Term	Contract type	Ref
June 21, 2004	Brad Stuart	1-year	Option exercised	
June 27, 2004	Tim Conboy		Entry-level	
June 30, 2004	Tom Preissing		Re-signing	
June 30, 2004	Mark Smith		Re-signing	
July 30, 2004	Rob Davison		Re-signing	
July 30, 2004	Jim Fahey		Re-signing	
August 3, 2004	Matt Carkner		Re-signing	
August 3, 2004	Niko Dimitrakos		Re-signing	
August 3, 2004	Scott Parker	1-year	Re-signing	
August 3, 2004	Vesa Toskala	2-year	Re-signing	
August 5, 2004	Nils Ekman	1-year	Arbitration award	
August 8, 2004	Scott Hannan	3-year	Re-signing	
August 13, 2004	Evgeni Nabokov	2-year	Re-signing	
September 8, 2004	Miroslav Zalesak		Re-signing	
September 15, 2004	Wayne Primeau	1-year	Re-signing	

== Draft picks ==
San Jose's picks at the 2004 NHL entry draft, which was held at the RBC Center in Raleigh, North Carolina on June 26–27, 2004.

Round	Pick	Player	Position	Nationality	Team (league)
1	22	Lukas Kaspar	Left wing	Czech Republic	HC Litvinov (Czech Extraliga)
3	94	Thomas Greiss	Goaltender	Germany	Cologne Sharks (DEL)
4	126	Torrey Mitchell	Center	Canada	Hotchkiss School (Conn.)
4	129	Jason Churchill	Goaltender	Canada	Halifax Mooseheads (QMJHL)
5	153	Steven Zalewski	Center	United States	Northwood School (N.Y.)
7	201	Michael Vernace	Defense	Canada	Bramalea Blues (OPJHL)
7	225	Dave MacDonald	Defense	Canada	New England Jr. Coyotes (EJHL)
8	234	Derek MacIntyre	Goaltender	United States	Soo Indians (NAHL)
9	288	Brian Mahoney-Wilson	Goaltender	United States	Catholic Memorial School (Mass.)
9	289	Christian Jensen	Defense	United States	New Jersey Junior Titans (AYHL)
