= 2004–05 Buffalo Sabres season =

NHL hockey team season

2004–05 Buffalo Sabres
- Division: Northeast
- Conference: Eastern
- 2004–05 record: Did not play

Team information
- General manager: Darcy Regier
- Coach: Lindy Ruff
- Captain: Vacant
- Arena: HSBC Arena
- Minor league affiliate: Rochester Americans

The 2004–05 Buffalo Sabres season was to be the 35th for the National Hockey League (NHL) franchise that was established on May 22, 1970. The season was cancelled as the 2004–05 NHL lockout could not be resolved in time to save the season.

== Schedule ==
The Sabres preseason and regular season schedules were announced on July 12 and July 14, 2004, respectively.

2004–05 schedule
Preseason

Game	Date	Opponent
1	September 24	Columbus Blue Jackets
2	September 25	Minnesota Wild
3	September 28	@ Toronto Maple Leafs
4	October 2	@ Montreal Canadiens
5	October 3	@ Minnesota Wild
6	October 6	Montreal Canadiens
7	October 8	Toronto Maple Leafs
8	October 10	@ Tampa Bay Lightning

Regular season

Game	Date	Opponent
1	October 15	@ Columbus Blue Jackets
2	October 16	New Jersey Devils
3	October 18	Tampa Bay Lightning
4	October 21	@ Atlanta Thrashers
5	October 22	@ Dallas Stars
6	October 24	@ Phoenix Coyotes
7	October 26	@ St. Louis Blues
8	October 28	San Jose Sharks
9	October 30	Pittsburgh Penguins
10	November 4	@ Boston Bruins
11	November 5	Philadelphia Flyers
12	November 12	Edmonton Oilers
13	November 13	@ New York Rangers
14	November 15	Toronto Maple Leafs
15	November 17	Carolina Hurricanes
16	November 19	New York Rangers
17	November 20	@ Carolina Hurricanes
18	November 24	Boston Bruins
19	November 26	Montreal Canadiens
20	November 27	@ Toronto Maple Leafs
21	December 1	Minnesota Wild
22	December 3	New York Islanders
23	December 4	@ Philadelphia Flyers
24	December 7	@ New Jersey Devils
25	December 9	Boston Bruins
26	December 11	@ Boston Bruins
27	December 13	Toronto Maple Leafs
28	December 15	@ Florida Panthers
29	December 17	@ Tampa Bay Lightning
30	December 19	Florida Panthers
31	December 21	@ Montreal Canadiens
32	December 22	Montreal Canadiens
33	December 26	New York Rangers
34	December 28	@ Pittsburgh Penguins
35	December 29	@ Chicago Blackhawks
36	January 1	Vancouver Canucks
37	January 3	Chicago Blackhawks
38	January 5	Ottawa Senators
39	January 8	@ New York Islanders
40	January 9	@ Washington Capitals
41	January 11	Atlanta Thrashers
42	January 13	Carolina Hurricanes
43	January 15	@ Philadelphia Flyers
44	January 17	@ Tampa Bay Lightning
45	January 19	@ Florida Panthers
46	January 21	@ Atlanta Thrashers
47	January 22	@ Ottawa Senators
48	January 25	St. Louis Blues
49	January 27	New York Islanders
50	January 29	@ New York Islanders
51	January 30	@ Boston Bruins
52	February 1	Toronto Maple Leafs
53	February 3	New Jersey Devils
54	February 5	Pittsburgh Penguins
55	February 8	Ottawa Senators
56	February 10	Washington Capitals
57	February 15	@ Detroit Red Wings
58	February 18	@ Toronto Maple Leafs
59	February 20	Atlanta Thrashers
60	February 22	Washington Capitals
61	February 25	Tampa Bay Lightning
62	February 26	@ Montreal Canadiens
63	March 1	@ Los Angeles Kings
64	March 3	@ San Jose Sharks
65	March 4	@ Anaheim Mighty Ducks
66	March 9	Boston Bruins
67	March 11	Ottawa Senators
68	March 12	@ Montreal Canadiens
69	March 15	Colorado Avalanche
70	March 18	@ New York Rangers
71	March 19	Nashville Predators
72	March 21	@ New Jersey Devils
73	March 23	Philadelphia Flyers
74	March 26	@ Ottawa Senators
75	March 27	Calgary Flames
76	March 29	@ Carolina Hurricanes
77	March 31	@ Pittsburgh Penguins
78	April 1	@ Ottawa Senators
79	April 3	Florida Panthers
80	April 6	@ Washington Capitals
81	April 8	Montreal Canadiens
82	April 9	@ Toronto Maple Leafs

== Transactions ==
The Sabres were involved in the following transactions from June 8, 2004, the day after the deciding game of the 2004 Stanley Cup Finals, through February 16, 2005, the day the 2004–05 season was officially cancelled.

=== Trades ===
The Sabres did not make any trades.

=== Players acquired ===
Date	Player	Former team	Term	Via	Ref
September 10, 2004	Todd Rohloff	Washington Capitals	1-year	Free agency	
September 10, 2004	Brandon Smith	New York Islanders	1-year	Free agency	

=== Players lost ===
Date	Player	New team	Via (Note: In parentheses is the player’s free agency group on July 1 if applicable.)	Ref
July 1, 2004	Karel Mosovsky (Note: Mosovsky was inactive during the 2004–05 season.)		Contract expiration (UFA)	
July 1, 2004	James Patrick (Note: Patrick was inactive during the 2004–05 season.)		Contract expiration (III)	
August 24, 2004	Rick Mrozik	Edmonton Road Runners (AHL)	Free agency (VI)	
September 4, 2004	Scott Ricci	Nottingham Panthers (EIHL)	Free agency (UFA)	
September 10, 2004	David Cullen	Rochester Americans (AHL)	Free agency (VI)	
October 18, 2004	Brian Chapman	Springfield Falcons (AHL)	Free agency (VI)	
December 6, 2004	Alexei Zhitnik	Ak Bars Kazan (RSL)	Free agency (III)	

=== Signings ===
Date	Player	Term	Contract type	Ref
June 30, 2004	Ales Kotalik	1-year	Option exercised	
July 23, 2004	Mike Grier	1-year	Re-signing	
July 28, 2004	Brian Campbell	1-year	Re-signing	
July 28, 2004	Jeff Jillson	1-year	Re-signing	
July 28, 2004	Taylor Pyatt	1-year	Re-signing	
July 28, 2004	Henrik Tallinder	1-year	Re-signing	
August 2, 2004	Maxim Afinogenov	1-year	Re-signing	
August 2, 2004	Tim Connolly	1-year	Re-signing	
August 2, 2004	Rory Fitzpatrick	1-year	Re-signing	
August 2, 2004	Mika Noronen	1-year	Re-signing	
August 6, 2004	Jochen Hecht	1-year	Re-signing	
August 9, 2004	Martin Biron	1-year	Arbitration settlement	
August 9, 2004	Brad Brown	1-year	Re-signing	
August 9, 2004	Jean-Pierre Dumont	1-year	Re-signing	
August 13, 2004	Daniel Briere	1-year	Arbitration settlement	
September 1, 2004	Dmitri Kalinin	1-year	Re-signing	
September 3, 2004	Thomas Vanek	3-year	Entry-level	
September 10, 2004	Jason Botterill	1-year	Re-signing	
September 14, 2004	Andrew Peters		Re-signing	
September 15, 2004	Milan Bartovic	1-year	Re-signing	
September 15, 2004	Doug Janik	1-year	Re-signing	
September 15, 2004	Ryan Miller	1-year	Re-signing	
September 15, 2004	Norm Milley	1-year	Re-signing	

== Draft picks ==
Buffalo's picks at the 2004 NHL entry draft, which was held at the RBC Center in Raleigh, North Carolina on June 26–27, 2004.

Round	Pick	Player	Position	Nationality	College/Junior Team
1	13	Drew Stafford	RW	United States	University of North Dakota (WCHA)
2	43	Michael Funk	D	Canada	Portland Winter Hawks (WHL)
3	71	Andrej Sekera	D	Slovakia	HC Dukla Trenčín (Slovak)
5	145	Michal Valent	G	Slovakia	MHC Martin (Slovak)
6	176	Patrick Kaleta	RW	United States	Peterborough Petes (OHL)
7	207	Mark Mancari	RW	Canada	Ottawa 67's (OHL)
8	241	Mike Card	D	Canada	Kelowna Rockets (WHL)
9	273	Dylan Hunter	LW	Canada	London Knights (OHL)

== Farm teams ==
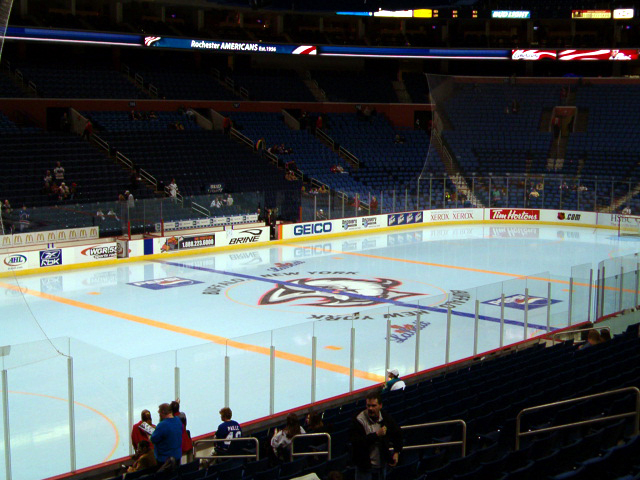
Ice experimentation during a Rochester Americans game at HSBC Arena (now KeyBank Center) in Buffalo, New York

The Sabres' AHL affiliate, the Rochester Americans, played with a roster that included many future Sabres. Thomas Vanek, Derek Roy, Ryan Miller and Jason Pominville among others, played the season in Rochester. HSBC Arena (now known as KeyBank Center) hosted a pair of Rochester games experimenting with blue ice to see if blue would make the television appearance better than white. The blue ice experiment was ultimately not accepted in post-lockout rule changes.

On the ice, the Americans finished the season with a 51–19–4–6 record, winning the Macgregor Kilpatrick Trophy for earning the most points in the AHL that season. They swept the Hamilton Bulldogs, 4 games to none, in the first round. However, the Americans were eliminated by the Manitoba Moose in the second round, four games to one.
