= 2004–05 Washington Capitals season =

NHL hockey team season

2004–05 Washington Capitals
- Division: Southeast
- Conference: Eastern
- 2004–05 record: Did not play

Team information
- General manager: George McPhee
- Coach: Glen Hanlon
- Captain: Vacant
- Arena: MCI Center
- Minor league affiliates: Portland Pirates; South Carolina Stingrays; Quad City Mallards

The 2004–05 Washington Capitals season was their 31st National Hockey League season. Its games were cancelled as the 2004–05 NHL lockout could not be resolved in time. As a result, Alexander Ovechkin, the first overall pick in the 2004 NHL entry draft, would not make his NHL debut until the start of the 2005–06 season.

== Schedule ==
The Capitals preseason and regular season schedules were announced on July 13 and July 14, 2004, respectively.

2004–05 schedule
Preseason

Game	Date	Opponent
1	September 23	Philadelphia Flyers
2	September 30	@ Philadelphia Flyers
3	October 2	@ Pittsburgh Penguins
4	October 6	Pittsburgh Penguins
5	October 8	@ Carolina Hurricanes
6	October 9	Carolina Hurricanes

Regular season

Game	Date	Opponent
1	October 16	@ Atlanta Thrashers
2	October 19	Atlanta Thrashers
3	October 21	Montreal Canadiens
4	October 23	New York Islanders
5	October 29	@ Tampa Bay Lightning
6	October 31	@ Florida Panthers
7	November 3	New Jersey Devils
8	November 5	Ottawa Senators
9	November 6	@ Philadelphia Flyers
10	November 9	@ Montreal Canadiens
11	November 11	Detroit Red Wings
12	November 13	New Jersey Devils
13	November 16	Phoenix Coyotes
14	November 18	Pittsburgh Penguins
15	November 20	New York Islanders
16	November 23	@ Toronto Maple Leafs
17	November 24	Philadelphia Flyers
18	November 26	New York Rangers
19	November 28	Florida Panthers
20	December 1	@ Anaheim Mighty Ducks
21	December 2	@ Los Angeles Kings
22	December 4	@ San Jose Sharks
23	December 6	@ New York Islanders
24	December 9	@ New York Rangers
25	December 11	Atlanta Thrashers
26	December 14	New York Rangers
27	December 17	Dallas Stars
28	December 18	@ New York Islanders
29	December 21	@ Pittsburgh Penguins
30	December 22	St. Louis Blues
31	December 26	Tampa Bay Lightning
32	December 28	Ottawa Senators
33	December 31	@ Atlanta Thrashers
34	January 1	Pittsburgh Penguins
35	January 3	Nashville Predators
36	January 5	Carolina Hurricanes
37	January 8	@ Atlanta Thrashers
38	January 9	Buffalo Sabres
39	January 12	@ Florida Panthers
40	January 14	@ Tampa Bay Lightning
41	January 16	Minnesota Wild
42	January 17	@ Carolina Hurricanes
43	January 20	@ St. Louis Blues
44	January 22	Florida Panthers
45	January 24	Philadelphia Flyers
46	January 27	@ Boston Bruins
47	January 28	Montreal Canadiens
48	January 30	Atlanta Thrashers
49	February 1	@ Ottawa Senators
50	February 3	@ Toronto Maple Leafs
51	February 4	@ Pittsburgh Penguins
52	February 6	Boston Bruins
53	February 8	Tampa Bay Lightning
54	February 10	@ Buffalo Sabres
55	February 15	@ Boston Bruins
56	February 19	@ Phoenix Coyotes
57	February 20	@ Dallas Stars
58	February 22	@ Buffalo Sabres
59	February 24	Colorado Avalanche
60	February 26	Carolina Hurricanes
61	February 27	@ Carolina Hurricanes
62	March 1	Chicago Blackhawks
63	March 3	@ Philadelphia Flyers
64	March 4	@ New Jersey Devils
65	March 7	@ New York Rangers
66	March 8	@ Montreal Canadiens
67	March 11	@ Florida Panthers
68	March 12	@ Tampa Bay Lightning
69	March 15	@ Carolina Hurricanes
70	March 16	Columbus Blue Jackets
71	March 18	Florida Panthers
72	March 20	Toronto Maple Leafs
73	March 22	@ Calgary Flames
74	March 24	@ Vancouver Canucks
75	March 26	@ Edmonton Oilers
76	March 28	@ Ottawa Senators
77	March 31	Boston Bruins
78	April 2	Tampa Bay Lightning
79	April 4	Carolina Hurricanes
80	April 6	Buffalo Sabres
81	April 8	Toronto Maple Leafs
82	April 9	@ New Jersey Devils

== Transactions ==
The Capitals were involved in the following transactions from June 8, 2004, the day after the deciding game of the 2004 Stanley Cup Finals, through February 16, 2005, the day the 2004–05 season was officially cancelled.

=== Trades ===
Date	Details		Ref
June 26, 2004	To Washington Capitals: 3rd-round pick in 2004	To Dallas Stars: 3rd-round pick in 2005	

=== Players acquired ===
Date	Player	Former team	Term	Via	Ref
August 2, 2004	Jeff Paul	New York Rangers	1-year	Free agency	
August 24, 2004	Louis Robitaille	Portland Pirates (AHL)	1-year	Free agency	
August 24, 2004	Jason Ulmer	Portland Pirates (AHL)	1-year	Free agency	

=== Players lost ===
Date	Player	New team	Via (Note: In parentheses is the player’s free agency group on July 1 if applicable.)	Ref
July 1, 2004	John Gruden (Note: Gruden retired.)		Contract expiration (UFA)	
July 1, 2004	Brad Norton (Note: Norton was inactive during the 2004–05 season.)		Contract expiration (UFA)	
July 11, 2004	Roman Tvrdon	Nottingham Panthers (EIHL)	Free agency (UFA)	
July 16, 2004	Joel Kwiatkowski	Florida Panthers	Free agency (UFA)	
August 5, 2004	Craig Johnson	Hamburg Freezers (DEL)	Free agency (III)	
August 10, 2004	Francois Methot	Augsburger Panther (DEL)	Free agency (VI)	
August 11, 2004	Colin Forbes	Carolina Hurricanes	Free agency (UFA)	
August 12, 2004	Mel Angelstad	Belfast Giants (EIHL)	Free agency (VI)	
September 2, 2004	Rick Berry	Phoenix Coyotes	Free agency (UFA)	
September 10, 2004	Todd Rohloff	Buffalo Sabres	Free agency (VI)	
September 14, 2004	Sebastien Charpentier	Saint-Hyacinthe Cousin (LNAH)	Free agency (VI)	
September 27, 2004	Chris Hajt	Augusta Lynx (ECHL)	Free agency (VI)	
December 5, 2004	Jean-Luc Grand-Pierre	IF Troja-Ljungby (Allsvenskan)	Free agency (UFA)	
December 7, 2004	Jean-Francois Fortin	Portland Pirates (AHL)	Free agency (VI)	
December 10, 2004	Matthew Yeats	Reading Royals (ECHL)	Free agency (UFA)	
December 26, 2004	Kip Miller	Grand Rapids Griffins (AHL)	Free agency (III)	
February 21, 2005	Bates Battaglia	Mississippi Sea Wolves (ECHL)	Free agency (UFA)	

=== Signings ===
Date	Player	Term	Contract type	Ref
June 30, 2004	Brian Willsie	1-year	Re-signing	
July 1, 2004	Jason Doig	1-year	Re-signing	
July 2, 2004	Darcy Verot	1-year	Re-signing	
July 6, 2004	Jakub Klepis	3-year	Entry-level	
July 8, 2004	Josef Boumedienne	1-year	Re-signing	
July 8, 2004	Trent Whitfield	1-year	Re-signing	
July 20, 2004	Jeff Halpern	1-year	Re-signing	
July 28, 2004	Graham Mink	1-year	Re-signing	
July 28, 2004	Matt Pettinger	1-year	Re-signing	
July 28, 2004	Nolan Yonkman	1-year	Re-signing	
August 2, 2004	Maxime Ouellet	1-year	Re-signing	
August 2, 2004	Stephen Peat	1-year	Re-signing	
August 2, 2004	Dwayne Zinger	1-year	Re-signing	
August 17, 2004	Brendan Witt	1-year	Arbitration award	

== Draft picks ==
Washington's picks at the 2004 NHL entry draft, which was held at the RBC Center in Raleigh, North Carolina on June 26–27, 2004. On April 6, 2004, Washington won the draft lottery to leap frog the Chicago Blackhawks and Pittsburgh Penguins and earn the right to select first overall.

Round	Pick	Player	Position	Nationality	Team (league)
1	1	Alexander Ovechkin	Left wing	Russia	HC Dynamo Moscow (RSL)
1	27	Jeff Schultz	Defense	Canada	Calgary Hitmen (WHL)
1	29	Mike Green	Defense	Canada	Saskatoon Blades (WHL)
2	33	Chris Bourque	Left wing	United States	Cushing Academy (Mass.)
2	62	Mikhail Yunkov	Center	Russia	Krylja Jr. (Russia)
3	66	Sami Lepisto	Defense	Finland	Jokerit (SM-liiga)
3	88	Clayton Barthel	Defense	Canada	Seattle Thunderbirds (WHL)
5	132	Oscar Hedman	Defense	Sweden	Modo Hockey (SEL)
5	138	Pasi Salonen	Left wing	Finland	HIFK Jr. (Finland)
6	166	Peter Guggisberg	Right wing	Switzerland	HC Davos (NLA)
7	197	Andrew Gordon	Right wing	Canada	Notre Dame Hounds (SJHL)
8	230	Justin Mrazek	Goaltender	Canada	Estevan Bruins (SJHL)
9	263	Travis Morin	Center	United States	Minnesota State Mavericks (WCHA)
