= 2004–05 Florida Panthers season =

National Hockey League team season

2004–05 Florida Panthers
- Division: Southeast
- Conference: Eastern
- 2004–05 record: Did not play

Team information
- General manager: Mike Keenan
- Coach: Jacques Martin
- Captain: Olli Jokinen
- Arena: Office Depot Center
- Minor league affiliates: San Antonio Rampage; Texas Wildcatters; Laredo Bucks

The 2004–05 Florida Panthers season was cancelled due to the lockout of the players of the National Hockey League.

== Off-season ==
General manager Rick Dudley was fired on May 24, 2004. Two days later Dudley was replaced by the head coach he had fired months earlier, Mike Keenan, while Jacques Martin was named the team’s new head coach.

== Schedule ==
The Panthers preseason and regular season schedules were announced on July 12 and July 14, 2004, respectively.

2004–05 schedule
Preseason

Game	Date	Opponent
1	September 26	@ Nashville Predators
2	September 27	Carolina Hurricanes
3	September 29	@ Ottawa Senators
4	October 1	@ Carolina Hurricanes
5	October 3	@ Tampa Bay Lightning
6	October 8	Tampa Bay Lightning

Regular season

Game	Date	Opponent
1	October 14	Philadelphia Flyers
2	October 16	@ Tampa Bay Lightning
3	October 19	@ Toronto Maple Leafs
4	October 21	@ Boston Bruins
5	October 23	Pittsburgh Penguins
6	October 27	Atlanta Thrashers
7	October 29	Nashville Predators
8	October 31	Washington Capitals
9	November 3	Montreal Canadiens
10	November 5	@ New York Rangers
11	November 6	@ New York Islanders
12	November 9	@ Ottawa Senators
13	November 12	Calgary Flames
14	November 14	Los Angeles Kings
15	November 17	@ Anaheim Mighty Ducks
16	November 18	@ Los Angeles Kings
17	November 20	@ San Jose Sharks
18	November 24	New Jersey Devils
19	November 26	Vancouver Canucks
20	November 28	@ Washington Capitals
21	November 29	@ Pittsburgh Penguins
22	December 1	St. Louis Blues
23	December 4	@ Tampa Bay Lightning
24	December 8	Montreal Canadiens
25	December 11	@ Phoenix Coyotes
26	December 13	@ Colorado Avalanche
27	December 15	Buffalo Sabres
28	December 17	Carolina Hurricanes
29	December 19	@ Buffalo Sabres
30	December 21	@ Philadelphia Flyers
31	December 23	@ New York Rangers
32	December 26	@ Carolina Hurricanes
33	December 27	New Jersey Devils
34	December 29	Boston Bruins
35	December 31	New York Rangers
36	January 4	@ New York Islanders
37	January 6	@ Ottawa Senators
38	January 8	@ Montreal Canadiens
39	January 12	Washington Capitals
40	January 15	Tampa Bay Lightning
41	January 17	Atlanta Thrashers
42	January 19	Buffalo Sabres
43	January 21	Boston Bruins
44	January 22	@ Washington Capitals
45	January 24	@ Boston Bruins
46	January 26	Toronto Maple Leafs
47	January 28	Pittsburgh Penguins
48	January 29	Carolina Hurricanes
49	February 2	Chicago Blackhawks
50	February 4	@ Atlanta Thrashers
51	February 5	Anaheim Mighty Ducks
52	February 8	@ New Jersey Devils
53	February 9	@ Pittsburgh Penguins
54	February 16	Ottawa Senators
55	February 19	New York Islanders
56	February 20	Detroit Red Wings
57	February 22	@ Toronto Maple Leafs
58	February 24	@ Montreal Canadiens
59	February 26	@ Columbus Blue Jackets
60	February 27	@ Minnesota Wild
61	March 2	Toronto Maple Leafs
62	March 4	@ Atlanta Thrashers
63	March 5	Tampa Bay Lightning
64	March 7	Ottawa Senators
65	March 9	Edmonton Oilers
66	March 11	Washington Capitals
67	March 12	@ Carolina Hurricanes
68	March 15	Philadelphia Flyers
69	March 18	@ Washington Capitals
70	March 19	Tampa Bay Lightning
71	March 21	Atlanta Thrashers
72	March 23	@ Dallas Stars
73	March 24	@ Nashville Predators
74	March 26	@ Tampa Bay Lightning
75	March 28	@ Atlanta Thrashers
76	March 30	New York Rangers
77	April 1	New York Islanders
78	April 3	@ Buffalo Sabres
79	April 5	@ Philadelphia Flyers
80	April 6	@ New Jersey Devils
81	April 8	Carolina Hurricanes
82	April 10	@ Carolina Hurricanes

== Transactions ==
The Panthers were involved in the following transactions from June 8, 2004, the day after the deciding game of the 2004 Stanley Cup Finals, through February 16, 2005, the day the 2004–05 season was officially cancelled.

=== Trades ===
Date	Details		Ref
June 26, 2004	To Florida Panthers: 2nd-round pick in 2004	To New York Rangers: 2nd-round pick in 2004; 3rd-round pick in 2004	
June 27, 2004	To Florida Panthers: 5th-round pick in 2004	To San Jose Sharks: 7th-round pick in 2004; 8th-round pick in 2004	

=== Players acquired ===
Date	Player	Former team	Term	Via	Ref
July 2, 2004	Jamie McLennan	New York Rangers	2-year (Note: Club option for a third year.)	Free agency	
July 5, 2004	Eric Cairns	New York Islanders		Free agency	
July 14, 2004	Alexander Karpovtsev	New York Islanders	2-year	Free agency	
July 15, 2004	Sean Hill	Carolina Hurricanes	2-year (Note: Option for a third year.)	Free agency	
July 16, 2004	Joel Kwiatkowski	Washington Capitals	1-year	Free agency	
July 23, 2004	Burke Henry	Chicago Blackhawks	1-year	Free agency	
July 23, 2004	Serge Payer	Ottawa Senators	1-year	Free agency	
August 25, 2004	Patrick DesRochers	Carolina Hurricanes	1-year	Free agency	

=== Players lost ===
Date	Player	New team	Via (Note: In parentheses is the player’s free agency group on July 1 if applicable.)	Ref
July 1, 2004	Donald Audette (Note: Audette was inactive during the 2004–05 season and announced his retirement on December 22, 2005.)		Contract expiration (III)	
July 1, 2004	Eric Messier (Note: Messier retired.)		Contract expiration (UFA)	
July 1, 2004	Lyle Odelein (Note: Odelein was inactive during the 2004–05 season.)		Contract expiration (III)	
July 1, 2004	Steve Shields (Note: Shields was inactive during the 2004–05 season.)		Contract expiration (III)	
July 2, 2004	Byron Ritchie	Calgary Flames	Free agency (UFA)	
July 7, 2004	Lee Goren	Vancouver Canucks	Free agency (VI)	
July 7, 2004	Denis Shvidki	Lokomotiv Yaroslavl (RSL)	Free agency (II) (Note: The Panthers retained Shvidki’s NHL rights through the 2007–08 season.)	
July 26, 2004	Andreas Lilja	Nashville Predators	Free agency (UFA)	
August 2, 2004	Pavel Trnka	HC Plzen (ELH)	Free agency (UFA)	
August 5, 2004	Matt Cullen	Carolina Hurricanes	Free agency (UFA)	
August 10, 2004	Paul Elliott	Laredo Bucks (CHL)	Free agency (UFA)	
August 19, 2004	Kent Huskins	Manitoba Moose (AHL)	Free agency (VI)	
September 9, 2004	Sean O'Connor	San Diego Gulls (ECHL)	Free agency (UFA)	
September 24, 2004	Simon Lajeunesse	Fresno Falcons (ECHL)	Free agency (UFA)	
September 25, 2004	David Morisset	Houston Aeros (AHL)	Free agency (UFA)	
September 8, 2004	Mikael Samuelsson	Geneve-Servette HC (NLA)	Free agency (UFA)	
December 20, 2004	Kristian Kudroc	Hammerby IF (Allsvenskan)	Free agency (UFA)	

=== Signings ===
Date	Player	Term	Contract type	Ref
July 26, 2004	Niklas Hagman	1-year	Re-signing	
July 26, 2004	Josh Olson	1-year	Re-signing	
August 2, 2004	Eric Beaudoin	1-year	Re-signing	
August 2, 2004	Darcy Hordichuk	1-year	Re-signing	
August 6, 2004	Ryan Jardine	1-year	Re-signing	
August 11, 2004	Mike Van Ryn	1-year	Re-signing	
August 25, 2004	Vaclav Nedorost	1-year	Re-signing	
September 10, 2004	Juraj Kolnik	1-year	Re-signing	
September 14, 2004	Christian Berglund	1-year	Re-signing	
September 14, 2004	Kamil Kreps		Entry-level	
September 16, 2004	Anthony Stewart		Entry-level	

== Draft picks ==
Florida's picks at the 2004 NHL entry draft, which was held at the RBC Center in Raleigh, North Carolina on June 26–27, 2004.

Round	Pick	Player	Position	Nationality	Team (league)
1	7	Rostislav Olesz	Left wing	Czech Republic	HC Vitkovice (Czech)
2	37	David Shantz	Goaltender	Canada	Mississauga IceDogs (OHL)
2	53	David Booth	Left wing	United States	Michigan State Spartans (CCHA)
4	105	Evan Schafer	Defense	Canada	Prince Albert Raiders (WHL)
5	152	Bret Nasby	Defense	Canada	Oshawa Generals (OHL)
9	267	Spencer Dillon	Defense	United States	Salmon Arm Silverbacks (BCHL)
9	283	Luke Beaverson	Defense	United States	Green Bay Gamblers (USHL)
