= Alexander Mikhailishin =

- Born: February 24, 1986 (age 40) Moscow Soviet Union
- Height: 6 ft 4 in (193 cm)
- Weight: 220 lb (100 kg; 15 st 10 lb)
- Position: Defence
- Shot: Left
- team Former teams: free agent HC Spartak Moscow
- NHL draft: 155th overall, 2004; New Jersey Devils
- Playing career: 2000–2007

Alexander Mikhailishin (born February 24, 1986, in Moscow, Soviet Union) spent most of his junior career skating in HC Spartak's hockey system. The young defenseman had a couple of stints with the Russian national team, but never earned a consistent spot on the squad. The young prospect was largely drafted by the New Jersey Devils with the 155th selection in the 2004 NHL entry draft due to his immense size, but it appears that the defensive prospect has not justified the club's hopes, splitting his time between Russia's second and third tier leagues, never even cracking the Russian Super League since being drafted.

== Career statistics ==
=== Regular season and playoffs ===
			Regular season					Playoffs
Season	Team	League	GP	G	A	Pts	PIM	GP	G	A	Pts	PIM
2000–01	Spartak–2 Moscow	RUS.3	3	0	0	0	4	—	—	—	—	—
2001–02	Spartak–2 Moscow	RUS.3	15	0	0	0	2	—	—	—	—	—
2002–03	Spartak–2 Moscow	RUS.3	27	2	1	3	26	—	—	—	—	—
2003–04	Spartak–2 Moscow	RUS.3	54	2	6	8	165	—	—	—	—	—
2004–05	Spartak Moscow	RSL	6	0	1	1	4	—	—	—	—	—
2004–05	Spartak–2 Moscow	RUS.3	40	2	4	6	133	—	—	—	—	—
2005–06	Spartak–2 Moscow	RUS.3	25	2	0	2	101	—	—	—	—	—
2006–07	Yuzhny Ural Orsk	RUS.2	22	0	0	0	126	—	—	—	—	—
2006–07	Krylia Sovetov–2 Moscow	RUS.3	12	1	1	2	22	—	—	—	—	—
RUS.3 totals			176	9	12	21	453	—	—	—	—	—
RSL totals			6	0	1	1	4	—	—	—	—	—

=== International ===
Year	Team	Event	GP	G	A	Pts	PIM
2003	Russia	U18	5	0	0	0	12
Junior totals			5	0	0	0	12
