= 2004–05 Boston Bruins season =

NHL team season

2004–05 Boston Bruins
- Division: Northeast
- Conference: Eastern
- 2004–05 record: Did not play

Team information
- General manager: Mike O'Connell
- Coach: Mike Sullivan
- Captain: Joe Thornton
- Arena: FleetCenter
- Minor league affiliate: Providence Bruins

The 2004–05 Boston Bruins season was the Bruins' 81st National Hockey League season, its games were cancelled as the 2004–05 NHL lockout could not be resolved in time.

== Off-season ==
The Bruins selected David Krejci as their first pick in the 2004 NHL entry draft, 63rd overall in the second round.

== Schedule ==
The Bruins preseason and regular season schedules were announced on July 14, 2004.

2004–05 schedule
Preseason

Game	Date	Opponent
1	September 24	@ Pittsburgh Penguins
2	September 26	@ Detroit Red Wings
3	September 28	@ Montreal Canadiens
4	September 29	@ Montreal Canadiens
5	September 30	Detroit Red Wings
6	October 2	New York Rangers
7	October 5	@ New York Rangers
8	October 9	New York Islanders

Regular season

Game	Date	Opponent
1	October 16	@ Dallas Stars
2	October 17	@ Colorado Avalanche
3	October 19	@ New York Islanders
4	October 21	Florida Panthers
5	October 23	San Jose Sharks
6	October 28	New York Islanders
7	October 30	Mighty Ducks of Anaheim
8	November 1	@ Ottawa Senators
9	November 3	@ New York Rangers
10	November 4	Buffalo Sabres
11	November 6	@ Toronto Maple Leafs
12	November 11	@ Philadelphia Flyers
13	November 13	Toronto Maple Leafs
14	November 16	@ Montreal Canadiens
15	November 18	Tampa Bay Lightning
16	November 20	Atlanta Thrashers
17	November 24	@ Buffalo Sabres
18	November 26	Ottawa Senators
19	November 27	@ Montreal Canadiens
20	December 1	@ Carolina Hurricanes
21	December 2	Ottawa Senators
22	December 4	Montreal Canadiens
23	December 7	@ Toronto Maple Leafs
24	December 9	@ Buffalo Sabres
25	December 11	Buffalo Sabres
26	December 12	@ New York Rangers
27	December 15	@ Philadelphia Flyers
28	December 16	Philadelphia Flyers
29	December 18	@ Ottawa Senators
30	December 21	Toronto Maple Leafs
31	December 23	St. Louis Blues
32	December 27	@ Tampa Bay Lightning
33	December 29	@ Florida Panthers
34	December 31	@ Pittsburgh Penguins
35	January 1	Toronto Maple Leafs
36	January 4	@ Toronto Maple Leafs
37	January 6	Montreal Canadiens
38	January 8	New York Rangers
39	January 11	Detroit Red Wings
40	January 14	@ New Jersey Devils
41	January 15	New Jersey Devils
42	January 17	Colorado Avalanche
43	January 19	@ Tampa Bay Lightning
44	January 21	@ Florida Panthers
45	January 24	Florida Panthers
46	January 27	Washington Capitals
47	January 29	Tampa Bay Lightning
48	January 30	Buffalo Sabres
49	February 1	@ Montreal Canadiens
50	February 3	Los Angeles Kings
51	February 5	Chicago Blackhawks
52	February 6	@ Washington Capitals
53	February 8	@ Atlanta Thrashers
54	February 10	Montreal Canadiens
55	February 15	Washington Capitals
56	February 17	@ Phoenix Coyotes
57	February 19	@ San Jose Sharks
58	February 22	@ Vancouver Canucks
59	February 25	@ Edmonton Oilers
60	February 26	@ Calgary Flames
61	February 28	New York Islanders
62	March 2	@ New Jersey Devils
63	March 3	@ Ottawa Senators
64	March 5	Philadelphia Flyers
65	March 7	Columbus Blue Jackets
66	March 9	@ Buffalo Sabres
67	March 10	Pittsburgh Penguins
68	March 13	@ New York Islanders
69	March 15	@ Atlanta Thrashers
70	March 17	Nashville Predators
71	March 19	Carolina Hurricanes
72	March 21	Ottawa Senators
73	March 23	@ Columbus Blue Jackets
74	March 24	@ Carolina Hurricanes
75	March 26	@ Minnesota Wild
76	March 28	Carolina Hurricanes
77	March 31	@ Washington Capitals
78	April 2	New Jersey Devils
79	April 4	Atlanta Thrashers
80	April 7	Pittsburgh Penguins
81	April 9	New York Rangers
82	April 10	@ Pittsburgh Penguins

== Transactions ==
The Bruins were involved in the following transactions from June 8, 2004, the day after the deciding game of the 2004 Stanley Cup Finals, through February 16, 2005, the day the 2004–05 season was officially cancelled.

=== Trades ===
Date	Details		Ref
June 26, 2004	To Boston Bruins: 2nd-round pick in 2004	To San Jose Sharks: 3rd-round pick in 2004; Tampa Bay’s 4th-round pick in 2004; 9th-round pick in 2004	

=== Players acquired ===
Date	Player	Former team	Term	Via	Ref
July 28, 2004	Tom Fitzgerald	Toronto Maple Leafs	2-year	Free agency	

=== Players lost ===
Date	Player	New team	Via (Note: In parentheses is the player’s free agency group on July 1 if applicable.)	Ref
June 30, 2004	Rich Brennan	SC Bern (NLA)	Free agency (VI)	
July 1, 2004	Mike Gellard (Note: Gellard retired.)		Contract expiration (UFA)	
July 1, 2004	Dan McGillis (Note: McGillis was inactive during the 2004–05 season.)		Contract expiration (III)	
July 1, 2004	Felix Potvin (Note: Potvin retired.)		Contract expiration (III)	
July 3, 2004	Mike Knuble	Philadelphia Flyers	Free agency (III)	
July 6, 2004	Ted Donato		Retirement (III)	
July 6, 2004	Sean O'Donnell	Phoenix Coyotes	Free agency (III)	
July 8, 2004	Brian Rolston	Minnesota Wild	Free agency (III)	
July 21, 2004	Andy Delmore	Adler Mannheim (DEL)	Free agency (UFA)	
July 22, 2004	Matt Herr	DEG Metro Stars (DEL)	Free agency (VI)	
August 10, 2004	Michael Nylander	New York Rangers	Free agency (III)	
August 18, 2004	Michal Grosek	Geneve-Servette HC (NLA)	Free agency (UFA)	
August 20, 2004	Jiri Slegr	HC Litvinov (ELH)	Free agency (III)	
August 23, 2004	Rob Zamuner	EHC Basel (NLB)	Free agency (III)	
September 2, 2004	Doug Doull	Phoenix Coyotes	Free agency (VI)	
September 5, 2004	Ivan Huml	HC Kladno (ELH)	Free agency (II) (Note: The Bruins retained Huml’s NHL rights through the 2005–06 season.)	
September 9, 2004	Chris Paradise	Fresno Falcons (ECHL)	Free agency (UFA)	
September 28, 2004	Craig MacDonald	Lowell Lock Monsters (AHL)	Free agency (UFA)	
October 2004	Ed Campbell	Hershey Bears (AHL)	Free agency (VI)	
October 1, 2004	Carl Corazzini	Providence Bruins (AHL)	Free agency (VI)	
October 1, 2004	Pat Leahy	Providence Bruins (AHL)	Free agency (UFA)	
N/A	Peter Metcalf	Utah Grizzlies (AHL)	Free agency (UFA)	
October 29, 2004	Darren Van Oene	Elmira Jackals (UHL)	Free agency (VI)	

=== Signings ===
Date	Player	Term	Contract type	Ref
June 30, 2004	Jonathan Girard	1-year	Re-signing	
July 7, 2004	Ian Moran	2-year	Re-signing	
July 20, 2004	Sergei Samsonov	1-year	Re-signing	
July 21, 2004	Hal Gill	1-year	Re-signing	
August 3, 2004	Sergei Gonchar	1-year	Arbitration award	
August 3, 2004	Andy Hilbert	1-year	Re-signing	
August 17, 2004	Joe Thornton	1-year	Arbitration award	

== Draft picks ==
Boston's picks at the 2004 NHL entry draft, which was held at the RBC Center in Raleigh, North Carolina on June 26–27, 2004.

Round	Pick	Player	Position	Nationality	Team (league)
2	63	David Krejci	Center	Czech Republic	HC Kladno Jrs. (Czech Republic)
2	64	Martins Karsums	Right wing	Latvia	Moncton Wildcats (QMJHL)
4	108	Ashton Rome	Right wing	Canada	Moose Jaw Warriors (WHL)
5	134	Kris Versteeg	Right wing	Canada	Lethbridge Hurricanes (WHL)
5	160	Ben Walter	Center	Canada	UMass Lowell River Hawks (Hockey East)
7	224	Matt Hunwick	Defense	United States	Michigan Wolverines (CCHA)
8	255	Anton Hedman	Forward	Sweden	Stocksunds IF (Sweden)
