= 2004–05 Pittsburgh Penguins season =

NHL team season

2004–05 Pittsburgh Penguins
- Division: Atlantic
- Conference: Eastern
- 2004–05 record: Did not play

Team information
- General manager: Craig Patrick
- Coach: Eddie Olczyk
- Captain: Mario Lemieux
- Arena: Mellon Arena
- Minor league affiliates: Wilkes-Barre/Scranton Penguins; Wheeling Nailers

The 2004–05 Pittsburgh Penguins season was the franchise's 38th season in the National Hockey League (NHL). However, due to the 2004–05 NHL lockout, no games were played.

== Schedule ==
The Penguins regular season schedule was announced on July 14, 2004. Their preseason schedule was released on August 6, 2004, with two changes announced five days later.

2004–05 schedule
Preseason

Game	Date	Opponent
1	September 25	Boston Bruins
2	September 26	Minnesota Wild
3	September 28	@ Ottawa Senators
4	September 30	Ottawa Senators
5	October 1	@ Minnesota Wild
6	October 2	Washington Capitals
7	October 6	@ Washington Capitals
8	October 8	@ Columbus Blue Jackets
9	October 9	Columbus Blue Jackets

Regular season

Game	Date	Opponent
1	October 15	@ New York Rangers
2	October 16	New York Rangers
3	October 19	@ Montreal Canadiens
4	October 23	@ Florida Panthers
5	October 26	San Jose Sharks
6	October 29	New York Rangers
7	October 30	@ Buffalo Sabres
8	November 5	@ Anaheim Mighty Ducks
9	November 6	@ Los Angeles Kings
10	November 8	@ Colorado Avalanche
11	November 11	Edmonton Oilers
12	November 13	Philadelphia Flyers
13	November 15	Phoenix Coyotes
14	November 17	Montreal Canadiens
15	November 18	@ Washington Capitals
16	November 20	@ New Jersey Devils
17	November 22	New Jersey Devils
18	November 24	Ottawa Senators
19	November 26	@ New York Islanders
20	November 28	@ New York Rangers
21	November 29	Florida Panthers
22	December 3	@ Carolina Hurricanes
23	December 4	Detroit Red Wings
24	December 7	Ottawa Senators
25	December 9	St. Louis Blues
26	December 11	New York Islanders
27	December 14	Vancouver Canucks
28	December 16	@ St. Louis Blues
29	December 18	@ Minnesota Wild
30	December 21	Washington Capitals
31	December 23	Philadelphia Flyers
32	December 26	@ Columbus Blue Jackets
33	December 28	Buffalo Sabres
34	December 31	Boston Bruins
35	January 1	@ Washington Capitals
36	January 4	@ Montreal Canadiens
37	January 7	Chicago Blackhawks
38	January 8	@ Ottawa Senators
39	January 11	@ Toronto Maple Leafs
40	January 14	New York Islanders
41	January 15	@ New York Rangers
42	January 17	Calgary Flames
43	January 19	@ Atlanta Thrashers
44	January 20	@ Philadelphia Flyers
45	January 22	Tampa Bay Lightning
46	January 25	@ Ottawa Senators
47	January 26	Carolina Hurricanes
48	January 28	@ Florida Panthers
49	January 30	@ Tampa Bay Lightning
50	February 2	Columbus Blue Jackets
51	February 4	Washington Capitals
52	February 5	@ Buffalo Sabres
53	February 9	Florida Panthers
54	February 10	@ Toronto Maple Leafs
55	February 15	@ New Jersey Devils
56	February 18	@ Carolina Hurricanes
57	February 19	Atlanta Thrashers
58	February 21	@ New York Islanders
59	February 24	@ Philadelphia Flyers
60	February 26	New York Rangers
61	February 27	Montreal Canadiens
62	March 1	Atlanta Thrashers
63	March 4	New York Islanders
64	March 5	@ Detroit Red Wings
65	March 8	Tampa Bay Lightning
66	March 10	@ Boston Bruins
67	March 12	@ Philadelphia Flyers
68	March 13	Toronto Maple Leafs
69	March 16	@ Dallas Stars
70	March 18	@ Tampa Bay Lightning
71	March 19	@ Atlanta Thrashers
72	March 22	@ Nashville Predators
73	March 24	New Jersey Devils
74	March 26	Carolina Hurricanes
75	March 27	@ New Jersey Devils
76	March 29	@ New York Islanders
77	March 31	Buffalo Sabres
78	April 2	Philadelphia Flyers
79	April 3	Toronto Maple Leafs
80	April 7	@ Boston Bruins
81	April 8	New Jersey Devils
82	April 10	Boston Bruins

== Transactions ==
The Penguins were involved in the following transactions from June 8, 2004, the day after the deciding game of the 2004 Stanley Cup Finals, through February 16, 2005, the day the 2004–05 season was officially cancelled.

=== Trades ===
The Penguins did not make any trades.

=== Players acquired ===
Date	Player	Former team	Term	Via	Ref
July 9, 2004	Mark Recchi	Philadelphia Flyers	multi-year	Free agency	
July 12, 2004	Ryan VandenBussche	Chicago Blackhawks		Free agency	
September 2, 2004	Chris Kelleher	Krefeld Pinguine (DEL)		Free agency	

=== Players lost ===
Date	Player	New team	Via (Note: In parentheses is the player’s free agency group on July 1 if applicable.)	Ref
June 23, 2004	Landon Wilson	Espoo Blues (Liiga)	Free agency (UFA)	
July 9, 2004	Tom Kostopoulos	Manchester Monarchs (AHL)	Free agency (VI)	
July 14, 2004	Eric Meloche	Philadelphia Flyers	Free agency (VI)	
July 28, 2004	Alexei Morozov	Ak Bars Kazan (RSL)	Free agency (II) (Note: The Penguins retained Morozov’s NHL rights through the 2005–06 season.)	
July 30, 2004	Toby Petersen	Edmonton Oilers	Free agency (UFA)	
August 18, 2004	Pauli Levokari	Porin Assat (Liiga)	Free agency (UFA)	
September 2, 2004	Jon Sim	Phoenix Coyotes	Free agency (UFA)	
September 8, 2004	Kelly Buchberger		Retirement (III) (Note: Buchberger was hired as an assistant coach with the Edmonton Road Runners.)	
September 10, 2004	Milan Kraft	HC Plzen (ELH)	Free agency (II) (Note: The Penguins retained Kraft’s NHL rights through the 2007–08 season.)	
October 25, 2004	Dan Focht	Hamilton Bulldogs (AHL)	Free agency (UFA)	
October 26, 2004	Steve McKenna	Nottingham Panthers (EIHL)	Free agency (UFA)	
November 13, 2004	Jean-Sebastien Aubin	St. John's Maple Leafs (AHL)	Free agency (UFA)	
January 24, 2005	Martin Brochu	Verdun Dragons (LNAH)	Free agency (VI)	
March 13, 2005	Reid Simpson	Rockford IceHogs (UHL)	Free agency (III)	

=== Signings ===
Date	Player	Term	Contract type	Ref
July 13, 2004	Ric Jackman	multi-year	Re-signing	
July 14, 2004	Matt Bradley		Re-signing	
July 15, 2004	Rico Fata	multi-year	Re-signing	
July 15, 2004	Lasse Pirjeta		Re-signing	
August 3, 2004	Ramzi Abid		Re-signing	
August 3, 2004	Kris Beech		Re-signing	
August 3, 2004	Shane Endicott		Re-signing	
August 3, 2004	Ross Lupaschuk		Re-signing	
August 4, 2004	Ben Eaves	multi-year	Entry-level	
August 24, 2004	Alain Nasreddine		Re-signing	
August 26, 2004	Matt Hussey		Re-signing	
September 2, 2004	Tomas Surovy	multi-year	Re-signing	
September 7, 2004	Guillaume Lefebvre		Re-signing	
September 8, 2004	Darcy Robinson		Re-signing	
September 9, 2004	Matt Murley		Re-signing	
September 13, 2004	David Koci	1-year	Re-signing	

== Draft picks ==
The 2004 NHL entry draft was held on June 26 at the RBC Center in Raleigh, North Carolina. The Penguins selected future Calder Memorial Trophy winner Evgeni Malkin with the second overall selection.

Round	#	Player	Pos	Nationality	College/Junior/Club team (League)
1	2	Evgeni Malkin	Forward	Russia	Metallurg Magnitogorsk (RSL)
2	31	Johannes Salmonsson	Forward	Sweden	Djurgårdens IF (Elitserien)
2	61^{[a]}	Alex Goligoski	Defense	United States	Sioux Falls Stampede (USHL)
3	67	Nick Johnson	Right wing	Canada	Dartmouth College (ECAC)
3	85^{[b]}	Brian Gifford	Center	United States	Moorhead Senior School (USHS-MN)
4	99	Tyler Kennedy	Center	Canada	Sault Ste. Marie Greyhounds (OHL)
5	130	Michal Sersen	Defense	Slovakia	Rimouski Océanic (QMJHL)
6	164	Moises Gutierrez	Right wing	United States	Kamloops Blazers (WHL)
7	194	Chris Peluso	Defense	United States	Brainerd High School (USHS-MN)
7	222^{[c]}	Jordan Morrison	Center	Canada	Peterborough Petes (OHL)
8	228	David Brown	Goaltender	Canada	University of Notre Dame (CCHA)
9	259	Brian Ihnacak	Center	Canada	Brown University (ECAC)

Draft notes

- ^{a} The Vancouver Canucks' second-round pick went to the Pittsburgh Penguins as a result of an August 25, 2003 trade that sent Johan Hedberg to the Canucks in exchange for this pick.
- ^{b} The Calgary Flames' third-round pick went to the Pittsburgh Penguins as a result of a February 9, 2003 trade that sent Andrew Ference to the Flames in exchange for this conditional pick.
- ^{c} The Vancouver Canucks' seventh-round pick went to the Pittsburgh Penguins as a result of a March 9, 2004 trade that sent Marc Bergevin to the Canucks in exchange for this pick.

== Farm teams ==
The American Hockey League (AHL)'s Wilkes-Barre/Scranton Penguins finished fourth in the East Division with a record of 40–30–7–3. They defeated the Binghamton Senators in the first round of the playoffs before losing in the second round to the eventual Calder Cup champion Philadelphia Phantoms.

The ECHL's Wheeling Nailers finished out of the playoffs in sixth in the North Division with a 38–25–9 record.
