= 2004–05 New York Rangers season =

NHL hockey team season

2004–05 New York Rangers
- Division: Atlantic
- Conference: Eastern
- 2004–05 record: Did not play

Team information
- General manager: Glen Sather
- Coach: Tom Renney
- Captain: Vacant
- Arena: Madison Square Garden
- Minor league affiliates: Hartford Wolf Pack; Charlotte Checkers

The 2004–05 New York Rangers season was the franchise's 79th season; however, its games were cancelled as the 2004–05 NHL lockout could not be resolved in time.

== Off-season ==
On July 6, 2004, it was announced that Tom Renney would remain the head coach of the Rangers.

== Schedule ==
The Rangers preseason and regular season schedules were announced on July 13 and July 14, 2004, respectively.

2004–05 schedule
Preseason

Game	Date	Opponent
1	September 23	New York Islanders
2	September 26	@ New York Islanders
3	September 28	@ New Jersey Devils
4	September 30	New Jersey Devils
5	October 2	@ Boston Bruins
6	October 5	Boston Bruins
7	October 6	@ Columbus Blue Jackets
8	October 8	@ Minnesota Wild
9	October 10	@ Detroit Red Wings

Regular season

Game	Date	Opponent
1	October 15	Pittsburgh Penguins
2	October 16	@ Pittsburgh Penguins
3	October 20	Philadelphia Flyers
4	October 23	Atlanta Thrashers
5	October 25	San Jose Sharks
6	October 29	@ Pittsburgh Penguins
7	October 30	@ Toronto Maple Leafs
8	November 1	Los Angeles Kings
9	November 3	Boston Bruins
10	November 5	Florida Panthers
11	November 6	@ Ottawa Senators
12	November 8	Nashville Predators
13	November 11	Toronto Maple Leafs
14	November 13	Buffalo Sabres
15	November 15	@ New York Islanders
16	November 17	@ Atlanta Thrashers
17	November 19	@ Buffalo Sabres
18	November 20	@ Montreal Canadiens
19	November 22	New York Islanders
20	November 24	@ Carolina Hurricanes
21	November 26	@ Washington Capitals
22	November 28	Pittsburgh Penguins
23	December 1	@ New Jersey Devils
24	December 2	@ Philadelphia Flyers
25	December 4	New Jersey Devils
26	December 6	Ottawa Senators
27	December 9	Washington Capitals
28	December 11	@ New Jersey Devils
29	December 12	Boston Bruins
30	December 14	@ Washington Capitals
31	December 17	New York Islanders
32	December 18	@ Philadelphia Flyers
33	December 21	@ Atlanta Thrashers
34	December 23	Florida Panthers
35	December 26	@ Buffalo Sabres
36	December 31	@ Florida Panthers
37	January 1	@ Tampa Bay Lightning
38	January 3	Anaheim Mighty Ducks
39	January 6	Columbus Blue Jackets
40	January 8	@ Boston Bruins
41	January 10	Montreal Canadiens
42	January 13	Phoenix Coyotes
43	January 15	Pittsburgh Penguins
44	January 18	@ Ottawa Senators
45	January 20	New Jersey Devils
46	January 22	Philadelphia Flyers
47	January 24	St. Louis Blues
48	January 25	@ New York Islanders
49	January 27	Atlanta Thrashers
50	January 29	@ Montreal Canadiens
51	February 2	@ Vancouver Canucks
52	February 3	@ Calgary Flames
53	February 5	@ Edmonton Oilers
54	February 8	Toronto Maple Leafs
55	February 10	@ New Jersey Devils
56	February 16	@ Minnesota Wild
57	February 17	@ Columbus Blue Jackets
58	February 19	Philadelphia Flyers
59	February 21	Chicago Blackhawks
60	February 23	Tampa Bay Lightning
61	February 26	@ Pittsburgh Penguins
62	February 27	Colorado Avalanche
63	March 2	Carolina Hurricanes
64	March 5	@ New York Islanders
65	March 7	Washington Capitals
66	March 9	@ Dallas Stars
67	March 11	@ Anaheim Mighty Ducks
68	March 13	@ San Jose Sharks
69	March 16	New Jersey Devils
70	March 18	Buffalo Sabres
71	March 19	@ Toronto Maple Leafs
72	March 22	Carolina Hurricanes
73	March 25	New York Islanders
74	March 26	@ Detroit Red Wings
75	March 28	Montreal Canadiens
76	March 30	@ Florida Panthers
77	March 31	@ Tampa Bay Lightning
78	April 2	@ Carolina Hurricanes
79	April 4	Tampa Bay Lightning
80	April 6	Ottawa Senators
81	April 7	@ Philadelphia Flyers
82	April 9	@ Boston Bruins

== Transactions ==
The Rangers were involved in the following transactions from June 8, 2004, the day after the deciding game of the 2004 Stanley Cup Finals, through February 16, 2005, the day the 2004–05 season was officially cancelled.

=== Trades ===
Date	Details		Ref
June 26, 2004	To New York Rangers: 1st-round pick in 2004; 8th-round pick in 2004	To Calgary Flames: 1st-round pick in 2004; 2nd-round pick in 2004	
June 26, 2004	To New York Rangers: 2nd-round pick in 2004; 3rd-round pick in 2004	To Florida Panthers: 2nd-round pick in 2004	
June 26, 2004	To New York Rangers: 2nd-round pick in 2004; 3rd-round pick in 2004	To Phoenix Coyotes: 2nd-round pick in 2004	

=== Players acquired ===
Date	Player	Former team	Term	Via	Ref
July 20, 2004	Trevor Gillies	Springfield Falcons (AHL)		Free agency	
July 20, 2004	Jason Strudwick	Chicago Blackhawks		Free agency	
July 22, 2004	Jeff MacMillan	Dallas Stars		Free agency	
August 10, 2004	Michael Nylander	Boston Bruins	3-year	Free agency	
August 25, 2004	Jason Marshall	San Jose Sharks		Free agency	
August 26, 2004	Kevin Weekes	Carolina Hurricanes		Free agency	

=== Players lost ===
Date	Player	New team	Via (Note: In parentheses is the player's free agency group on July 1 if applicable.)	Ref
July 1, 2004	Bobby Andrews (Note: Andrews retired.)		Contract expiration (VI)	
July 1, 2004	Pavel Bure (Note: Bure last played during the 2002–03 season and announced his retirement on November 1, 2005.)		Contract expiration (III)	
July 1, 2004	Eric Lindros (Note: Lindros was inactive during the 2004–05 season.)		Contract expiration (III)	
July 1, 2004	Sandy McCarthy (Note: McCarthy retired.)		Contract expiration (III)	
July 1, 2004	Mark Messier (Note: Messier was inactive during the 2004–05 season and announced his retirement on September 12, 2005.)		Contract expiration (III)	
July 1, 2004	Boris Mironov (Note: Mironov was inactive during the 2004–05 and 2005–06 seasons.)		Contract expiration (III)	
July 2, 2004	Jamie McLennan	Florida Panthers	Free agency (III)	
July 14, 2004	Cory Larose	Atlanta Thrashers	Free agency (VI)	
July 28, 2004	Jason MacDonald	Toronto Maple Leafs	Free agency	
August 2, 2004	Mike Green	Nurnberg Ice Tigers (DEL)	Free agency (II) (Note: The Rangers retained Green’s NHL rights until trading them to the Dallas Stars on June 14, 2006.)	
August 2, 2004	Jeff Paul	Washington Capitals	Free agency (VI)	
August 6, 2004	Jan Hlavac	HC Sparta Praha (ELH)	Free agency (UFA)	
August 9, 2004	Jamie Pushor	Syracuse Crunch (AHL)	Free agency (III)	
August 11, 2004	Matt Kinch	EC Red Bull Salzburg (EBEL)	Free agency (II) (Note: New York retained Kinch's NHL rights through the 2004–05 season.)	
August 19, 2004	Jeff Heerema	Vancouver Canucks	Free agency (UFA)	
August 24, 2004	Benoit Dusablon	Montreal Canadiens	Free agency (UFA)	
September 27, 2004	Josh Green	Manitoba Moose (AHL)	Free agency (UFA)	
N/A	John Jakopin	HDD Olimpija Ljubljana (SIHL)	Free agency (UFA)	
November 1, 2004	Dan LaCouture	Providence Bruins (AHL)	Free agency (UFA)	
January 7, 2005	Chris McAllister	Newcastle Vipers (BNL)	Free agency (UFA)	
March 17, 2005	Joel Bouchard	Hartford Wolf Pack (AHL)	Free agency (UFA)	

=== Signings ===
Date	Player	Term	Contract type	Ref
July 22, 2004	Lucas Lawson		Re-signing	
July 22, 2004	Karel Rachunek	1-year	Re-signing	
July 27, 2004	Dale Purinton		Re-signing	
July 29, 2004	Dan Blackburn		Re-signing	
July 29, 2004	David Liffiton		Entry-level	
August 3, 2004	Dwight Helminen		Entry-level	
August 4, 2004	Jake Taylor		Entry-level	
August 10, 2004	Jamie Lundmark	1-year	Re-signing	
August 11, 2004	Martin Grenier		Re-signing	
August 11, 2004	Layne Ulmer		Re-signing	
August 18, 2004	Chad Wiseman		Re-signing	
September 1, 2004	Nigel Dawes		Entry-level	
September 14, 2004	Lee Falardeau		Entry-level	
September 15, 2004	Ivan Baranka		Entry-level	

== Draft picks ==
New York's picks at the 2004 NHL entry draft in Raleigh, North Carolina at the RBC Center.

Round	#	Player	Position	Nationality	College/Junior/Club team (League)
1	6	Al Montoya	G	United States	University of Michigan (CCHA)
1	19	Lauri Korpikoski	LW	Finland	TPS Jr. (Finland Jr.)
2	36	Darin Olver	C	Canada	Northern Michigan University (CCHA)
2	48	Dane Byers	LW	Canada	Prince Albert Raiders (WHL)
2	51	Bruce Graham	C	Canada	Moncton Wildcats (QMJHL)
2	60	Brandon Dubinsky	C	United States	Portland Winter Hawks (WHL)
3	73	Zdenek Bahensky	RW	Czech Republic	HC Chemopetrol Jr. (Czech Republic)
3	80	Billy Ryan	C	United States	Cushing Academy (USHS)
4	127	Ryan Callahan	RW	United States	Guelph Storm (OHL)
5	135	Roman Psurny	LW	Czech Republic	Zlín Jr. (Czech Jr.)
6	169	Jordan Foote	LW	Canada	Nanaimo Clippers (BCHL)
8	247	Jonathan Paiement	D	Canada	Lewiston Maineiacs (QMJHL)
9	266	Jakub Petruzalek	RW	Czech Republic	HC Chemopetrol Jr. (Czech Republic)
