= 2004–05 New York Islanders season =

NHL hockey team season

2004–05 New York Islanders
- Division: Atlantic
- Conference: Eastern
- 2004–05 record: Did not play

Team information
- General manager: Mike Milbury
- Coach: Steve Stirling
- Captain: Michael Peca
- Arena: Nassau Veterans Memorial Coliseum
- Minor league affiliates: Bridgeport Sound Tigers; Atlantic City Boardwalk Bullies

The 2004–05 New York Islanders season was the 33rd season in the franchise's history. However, its games were cancelled as the 2004–05 NHL lockout could not be resolved in time.

== Off-season ==
The Islanders chose Petteri Nokelainen as their first-round choice, sixteenth overall.

== Schedule ==
The Islanders regular season schedule was announced on July 14, 2004. Their preseason schedule was announced on July 16, 2004.

2004–05 schedule
Preseason

Game	Date	Opponent
1	September 23	@ New York Rangers
2	September 26	New York Rangers
3	October 1	New Jersey Devils
4	October 3	Philadelphia Flyers
5	October 5	@ Philadelphia Flyers
6	October 8	@ New Jersey Devils
7	October 9	@ Boston Bruins

Regular season

Game	Date	Opponent
1	October 16	Carolina Hurricanes
2	October 19	Boston Bruins
3	October 20	@ New Jersey Devils
4	October 23	@ Washington Capitals
5	October 26	New Jersey Devils
6	October 28	@ Boston Bruins
7	October 30	Los Angeles Kings
8	November 1	Tampa Bay Lightning
9	November 3	@ Minnesota Wild
10	November 4	@ St. Louis Blues
11	November 6	Florida Panthers
12	November 9	Toronto Maple Leafs
13	November 11	Nashville Predators
14	November 13	Dallas Stars
15	November 15	New York Rangers
16	November 17	@ Philadelphia Flyers
17	November 19	@ Atlanta Thrashers
18	November 20	@ Washington Capitals
19	November 22	@ New York Rangers
20	November 24	Montreal Canadiens
21	November 26	Pittsburgh Penguins
22	November 27	Philadelphia Flyers
23	November 30	Ottawa Senators
24	December 3	@ Buffalo Sabres
25	December 4	Carolina Hurricanes
26	December 6	Washington Capitals
27	December 10	@ Philadelphia Flyers
28	December 11	@ Pittsburgh Penguins
29	December 14	@ Toronto Maple Leafs
30	December 17	@ New York Rangers
31	December 18	Washington Capitals
32	December 21	@ Detroit Red Wings
33	December 23	@ New Jersey Devils
34	December 26	@ Ottawa Senators
35	December 30	Anaheim Mighty Ducks
36	December 31	@ Carolina Hurricanes
37	January 2	Detroit Red Wings
38	January 4	Florida Panthers
39	January 6	New Jersey Devils
40	January 8	Buffalo Sabres
41	January 11	Colorado Avalanche
42	January 14	@ Pittsburgh Penguins
43	January 15	Phoenix Coyotes
44	January 18	@ Toronto Maple Leafs
45	January 20	@ Edmonton Oilers
46	January 21	@ Calgary Flames
47	January 23	@ Vancouver Canucks
48	January 25	New York Rangers
49	January 27	@ Buffalo Sabres
50	January 29	Buffalo Sabres
51	February 1	Philadelphia Flyers
52	February 3	Ottawa Senators
53	February 5	Columbus Blue Jackets
54	February 6	@ Montreal Canadiens
55	February 9	@ Carolina Hurricanes
56	February 10	@ Tampa Bay Lightning
57	February 15	Atlanta Thrashers
58	February 17	@ Tampa Bay Lightning
59	February 19	@ Florida Panthers
60	February 21	Pittsburgh Penguins
61	February 22	@ Montreal Canadiens
62	February 24	San Jose Sharks
63	February 26	@ New Jersey Devils
64	February 28	@ Boston Bruins
65	March 4	@ Pittsburgh Penguins
66	March 5	New York Rangers
67	March 7	Atlanta Thrashers
68	March 11	Montreal Canadiens
69	March 13	Boston Bruins
70	March 15	@ Phoenix Coyotes
71	March 17	@ Los Angeles Kings
72	March 20	@ Chicago Blackhawks
73	March 22	Tampa Bay Lightning
74	March 25	@ New York Rangers
75	March 26	New Jersey Devils
76	March 28	@ Philadelphia Flyers
77	March 29	Pittsburgh Penguins
78	April 1	@ Florida Panthers
79	April 2	@ Atlanta Thrashers
80	April 5	Toronto Maple Leafs
81	April 8	@ Ottawa Senators
82	April 9	Philadelphia Flyers

== Transactions ==
The Islanders were involved in the following transactions from June 8, 2004, the day after the deciding game of the 2004 Stanley Cup Finals, through February 16, 2005, the day the 2004–05 season was officially cancelled.

=== Trades ===
The Islanders did not make any trades.

=== Players acquired ===
Date	Player	Former team	Term	Via	Ref
June 10, 2004	Kevin Colley	Bridgeport Sound Tigers (AHL)	1-year	Free agency	
August 10, 2004	Matt Koalska	University of Minnesota (WCHA)		Free agency	
August 11, 2004	Jim Campbell	Chicago Wolves (AHL)		Free agency	
August 12, 2004	Keith Aldridge	Eisbaren Berlin (DEL)		Free agency	
August 13, 2004	Richard Seeley	Los Angeles Kings		Free agency	
August 16, 2004	Vince Macri	Bridgeport Sound Tigers (AHL)		Free agency	
August 25, 2004	Barrett Heisten	Dallas Stars	1-year	Free agency	

=== Players lost ===
Date	Player	New team	Via (Note: In parentheses is the player's free agency group on July 1 if applicable.)	Ref
July 1, 2004	Cliff Ronning (Note: Ronning was inactive during the 2004–05 season and announced his retirement on February 15, 2006.)		Contract expiration (III)	
July 1, 2004	Steve Webb (Note: Webb retired.)		Contract expiration (UFA)	
July 5, 2004	Eric Cairns	Florida Panthers	Free agency (UFA)	
July 14, 2004	Alexander Karpovtsev	Florida Panthers	Free agency (III)	
July 21, 2004	Eric Manlow	Detroit Red Wings	Free agency (VI)	
September 9, 2004	Mariusz Czerkawski	Djurgårdens IF (SHL)	Free agency (III)	
September 9, 2004	Cail MacLean	Hershey Bears (AHL)	Free agency (UFA)	
September 10, 2004	Brandon Smith	Buffalo Sabres	Free agency (VI)	
November 4, 2004	Derek Bekar	Dundee Stars (BNL)	Free agency (VI)	

=== Signings ===
Date	Player	Term	Contract type	Ref
July 18, 2004	Justin Papineau	1-year	Re-signing	
July 27, 2004	Tomi Pettinen	1-year	Re-signing	
July 30, 2004	Dave Scatchard	1-year	Re-signing	
August 2, 2004	Mark Parrish	1-year	Re-signing	
August 3, 2004	Trent Hunter	1-year	Re-signing	
August 4, 2004	Jason Blake	3-year	Re-signing	
August 4, 2004	Mattias Weinhandl	1-year	Re-signing	
August 7, 2004	Adrian Aucoin	1-year	Arbitration award	
August 12, 2004	Janne Niinimaa	3-year	Re-signing	
August 17, 2004	Oleg Kvasha	1-year	Arbitration award	
August 31, 2004	Steve Regier	2-year	Entry-level	
September 2, 2004	Chris Campoli	2-year	Entry-level	
September 15, 2004	Ryan Caldwell	2-year	Entry-level	

== Draft picks ==
The Islanders picks at the 2004 NHL entry draft, which was held at the RBC Center in Raleigh, North Carolina on June 26–27, 2004.

Rd.	#	Player	Position	Nationality	College/Junior/Club team
1	16	Petteri Nokelainen	Right wing	Finland	SaiPa (SM-liiga)
2	47	Blake Comeau	Right wing	Canada	Kelowna Rockets (WHL)
3	82	Sergei Ogorodnikov	Center	Russia	Tver (Russia)
4	115	Wes O'Neill	Defense	Canada	University of Notre Dame (Hockey East)
5	148	Steve Regier	Left wing	Canada	Medicine Hat Tigers (WHL)
6	179	Jaroslav Mrazek	Left wing	Czech Republic	Sparta Praha Jr. (Czech Rep)
7	210	Emil Axelsson	Defense	Sweden	Örebro HK (Sweden)
7	227	Chris Campoli	Defense	Canada	Erie Otters (OHL)
8	244	Jason Pitton	Left wing	Canada	Sault Ste. Marie Greyhounds (OHL)
9	276	Sylvain Michaud	Goaltender	Canada	Drummondville Voltigeurs (QMJHL)

== Farm teams ==
- Bridgeport Sound Tigers
