= 2004–05 Tampa Bay Lightning season =

National Hockey League team season

2004–05 Tampa Bay Lightning
- Division: Southeast
- Conference: Eastern
- 2004–05 record: Did not play

Team information
- General manager: Jay Feaster
- Coach: John Tortorella
- Captain: Dave Andreychuk
- Arena: St. Pete Times Forum
- Minor league affiliates: Springfield Falcons; Johnstown Chiefs; Adirondack Frostbite

The 2004–05 Tampa Bay Lightning season was the franchise's 13th season in the National Hockey League. Its games were canceled due to the lockout of players. Because the entire season was canceled due to the lockout, the Lightning were allowed to retain their status as the Stanley Cup champions.

== Schedule ==
Tampa Bay’s regular season schedule was announced on July 14, 2004. Their preseason schedule was released on August 2, 2004.

2004–05 schedule
Preseason

Game	Date	Opponent
1	September 23	@ Montreal Canadiens
2	September 25	Carolina Hurricanes
3	September 26	@ Atlanta Thrashers
4	September 28	Carolina Hurricanes
5	October 3	Florida Panthers
6	October 5	Atlanta Thrashers
7	October 8	@ Florida Panthers
8	October 10	Buffalo Sabres

Regular season

Game	Date	Opponent
1	October 13	Philadelphia Flyers
2	October 16	Florida Panthers
3	October 18	@ Buffalo Sabres
4	October 21	@ Phoenix Coyotes
5	October 23	@ Colorado Avalanche
6	October 27	Nashville Predators
7	October 29	Washington Capitals
8	November 1	@ New York Islanders
9	November 2	@ Toronto Maple Leafs
10	November 4	Carolina Hurricanes
11	November 6	@ New Jersey Devils
12	November 10	@ Atlanta Thrashers
13	November 11	Calgary Flames
14	November 13	Atlanta Thrashers
15	November 18	@ Boston Bruins
16	November 20	@ Ottawa Senators
17	November 24	Vancouver Canucks
18	November 26	New Jersey Devils
19	November 27	@ Carolina Hurricanes
20	November 30	@ Philadelphia Flyers
21	December 2	St. Louis Blues
22	December 4	Florida Panthers
23	December 7	@ Atlanta Thrashers
24	December 9	Montreal Canadiens
25	December 11	Ottawa Senators
26	December 14	@ Montreal Canadiens
27	December 15	@ New Jersey Devils
28	December 17	Buffalo Sabres
29	December 19	@ Columbus Blue Jackets
30	December 22	@ Chicago Blackhawks
31	December 23	@ Minnesota Wild
32	December 26	@ Washington Capitals
33	December 27	Boston Bruins
34	December 29	New Jersey Devils
35	January 1	New York Rangers
36	January 2	Dallas Stars
37	January 5	@ Anaheim Mighty Ducks
38	January 6	@ Los Angeles Kings
39	January 8	@ San Jose Sharks
40	January 12	Minnesota Wild
41	January 14	Washington Capitals
42	January 15	@ Florida Panthers
43	January 17	Buffalo Sabres
44	January 19	Boston Bruins
45	January 21	@ Carolina Hurricanes
46	January 22	@ Pittsburgh Penguins
47	January 25	@ Philadelphia Flyers
48	January 27	Toronto Maple Leafs
49	January 29	@ Boston Bruins
50	January 30	Pittsburgh Penguins
51	February 1	Chicago Blackhawks
52	February 5	Atlanta Thrashers
53	February 8	@ Washington Capitals
54	February 10	New York Islanders
55	February 15	Ottawa Senators
56	February 17	New York Islanders
57	February 19	Detroit Red Wings
58	February 21	@ Carolina Hurricanes
59	February 23	@ New York Rangers
60	February 25	@ Buffalo Sabres
61	February 26	@ Ottawa Senators
62	March 1	Toronto Maple Leafs
63	March 4	Carolina Hurricanes
64	March 5	@ Florida Panthers
65	March 8	@ Pittsburgh Penguins
66	March 11	Edmonton Oilers
67	March 12	Washington Capitals
68	March 14	@ Dallas Stars
69	March 16	Philadelphia Flyers
70	March 18	Pittsburgh Penguins
71	March 19	@ Florida Panthers
72	March 22	@ New York Islanders
73	March 24	Montreal Canadiens
74	March 26	Florida Panthers
75	March 28	@ Toronto Maple Leafs
76	March 29	@ Montreal Canadiens
77	March 31	New York Rangers
78	April 2	@ Washington Capitals
79	April 4	@ New York Rangers
80	April 6	Carolina Hurricanes
81	April 8	Atlanta Thrashers
82	April 10	@ Atlanta Thrashers

== Transactions ==
The Lightning were involved in the following transactions from June 8, 2004, the day after the deciding game of the 2004 Stanley Cup Finals, through February 16, 2005, the day the 2004–05 season was officially canceled.

=== Trades ===
Date	Details		Ref
June 27, 2004	To Tampa Bay Lightning: 5th-round pick in 2004; 6th-round pick in 2004; San Jose's 6th-round pick in 2004	To Philadelphia Flyers: 3rd-round pick in 2005	
August 16, 2004	To Tampa Bay Lightning: Vaclav Prospal	To Mighty Ducks of Anaheim: 2nd-round pick in 2005	

=== Players acquired ===
Date	Player	Former team	Term	Via	Ref
July 19, 2004	Craig Darby	New Jersey Devils		Free agency	
July 28, 2004	Steve McLaren	St. Louis Blues	multi-year	Free agency	
July 28, 2004	Jarrod Skalde	Dallas Stars	multi-year	Free agency	
September 15, 2004	Andre Deveaux	Owen Sound Attack (OHL)	3-year	Free agency	

=== Players lost ===
Date	Player	New team	Via (Note: In parentheses is the player’s free agency group on July 1 if applicable.)	Ref
June 8, 2004	Pascal Trepanier	Nurnberg Ice Tigers (DEL)	Free agency (UFA)	
June 30, 2004	Dwayne Hay	Pensacola Ice Pilots (ECHL)	Free agency (VI)	
July 12, 2004	Sheldon Keefe	Phoenix Coyotes	Free agency (UFA)	
July 20, 2004	Evgeny Konstantinov	HC Dynamo Moscow (RSL)	Free agency (UFA)	
July 22, 2004	Jassen Cullimore	Chicago Blackhawks	Free agency (III)	
August 2, 2004	Eero Somervuori	Karpat (Liiga)	Free agency (II) (Note: The Lightning retained Somervuori’s NHL rights through the 2006–07 season.)	
August 12, 2004	Darren Rumble	Springfield Falcons (AHL)	Free agency (III)	
August 16, 2004	Cory Stillman (Note: Stillman was inactive during the 2004–05 season.)		Release (II) (Note: Stillman received a $3.9 million arbitration award on August 15. The Lightning decided to “walk away” from the award, making Stillman an unrestricted free agent.)	
September 2004	Jeremy Van Hoof	Springfield Falcons (AHL)	Free agency (UFA)	
December 2, 2004	Ben Clymer	EHC Biel (NLB)	Free agency (UFA)	
December 16, 2004	Stanislav Neckar	HC Ceske Budejovice (ELH)	Free agency (UFA)	

=== Signings ===
Date	Player	Term	Contract type	Ref
June 17, 2004	Nikolai Khabibulin	1-year	Option exercised	
July 23, 2004	Chris Dingman	multi-year	Re-signing	
July 23, 2004	Brian Eklund	1-year	Re-signing	
July 23, 2004	Nolan Pratt	1-year	Re-signing	
July 30, 2004	Mike Egener	multi-year	Entry-level	
July 30, 2004	Dennis Packard	multi-year	Entry-level	
July 30, 2004	Nick Tarnasky	multi-year	Entry-level	
August 3, 2004	Dmitri Afanasenkov	1-year	Re-signing	
August 3, 2004	Nikita Alexeev	1-year	Re-signing	
August 5, 2004	Ruslan Fedotenko	1-year	Arbitration award	
August 5, 2004	Pavel Kubina	2-year	Arbitration award	
August 8, 2004	Cory Sarich	2-year	Re-signing	
August 9, 2004	Fredrik Modin	3-year	Re-signing	
August 20, 2004	Shane Willis	1-year	Re-signing	
September 1, 2004	Martin Cibak	1-year	Re-signing	
September 1, 2004	Doug O'Brien	3-year	Entry-level	
September 14, 2004	Dave Andreychuk	1-year	Re-signing	

== Draft picks ==
Tampa Bay's picks at the 2004 NHL entry draft, which was held at the RBC Center in Raleigh, North Carolina on June 26–27, 2004.

Round	Pick	Player	Position	Nationality	Team (league)
1	30	Andy Rogers	Defense	Canada	Calgary Hitmen (WHL)
2	65	Mark Tobin	Left wing	Canada	Rimouski Oceanic (QMJHL)
4	102	Mike Lundin	Defense	United States	Maine Black Bears (Hockey East)
5	158	Brandon Elliott	Defense	Canada	Mississauga IceDogs (OHL)
5	163	Dusty Collins	Center	United States	Northern Michigan Wildcats (CCHA)
6	188	Jan Zapletal	Defense	Czech Republic	Vsetin Jr. (Czech)
6	191	Karri Ramo	Goaltender	Finland	Pelicans (Finland)
8	245	Justin Keller	Left wing	Canada	Kelowna Rockets (WHL)
