= 2004–05 Mighty Ducks of Anaheim season =

NHL team season

2004–05 Mighty Ducks of Anaheim
- Division: Pacific
- Conference: Western
- 2004–05 record: Did not play

Team information
- General manager: Al Coates
- Coach: Mike Babcock
- Captain: Steve Rucchin
- Arena: Arrowhead Pond of Anaheim
- Minor league affiliates: Cincinnati Mighty Ducks; San Diego Gulls

The 2004–05 Mighty Ducks of Anaheim season would have been the Mighty Ducks' 12th season of play in the NHL, however, the 2004–05 NHL lockout cancelled all of the games for the season.

== Off-season ==
General manager Bryan Murray resigned on June 8, 2004, and left to become the new head coach of the Ottawa Senators. Al Coates, Anaheim’s senior vice-president of business operations, was named interim general manager.

Along with the rest of the National Hockey League, the Mighty Ducks of Anaheim entered the 2004 offseason with many questions. While most of the NHL was concerned with a possible lockout due to negotiations concerning a new Collective Bargaining Agreement, the Mighty Ducks had even more issues concerning the future ownership of the franchise and the future of the franchise in Orange County. The owners of the Ducks at the time, the Walt Disney Company was looking to sell the team and people in the community were not all too confident that the team would remain in Anaheim. On September 10, just a month before the 2004–05 season was scheduled to start, it was reported in the Los Angeles Times, Orange County Register, and the Associated Press that former Hartford Whalers and Pittsburgh Penguins owner Howard Baldwin was interested in purchasing the Mighty Ducks and moving them to Kansas City, Missouri to play in the then-under construction arena now known as Sprint Center. The lockout, however, began just six days later and extended well into what would have been the regular season and eventually causing the cancellation of the season entirely. With the Kansas City rumors circulating and the lockout already harming business at the Arrowhead Pond, Henry Samueli (the owner of Anaheim Arena Management, the operator of the Pond) got into negotiations to purchase the team so the arena would not lose its primary tenant. Samueli eventually bought the team in 2005 and took over day-to-day operations of the club in June 2005.

== Regular season ==
See the game log below for the entire season schedule.

The season for the Mighty Ducks were scheduled to begin Wednesday, October 13 with a home game against Calgary. Their first road game was to be on Sunday, October 17 against cross-town rival Los Angeles. Their longest homestand was supposed to be from March 2-March 13 (6 home games), and their longest road trip was to be from January 29–February 10 (7 road games). Their final game of the regular season was scheduled on Sunday, April 10 against Columbus at the Arrowhead Pond. During the Lockout all their potential rookies such as Ilya Bryzgalov, Dustin Penner, Kurtis Foster, Shane O'Brien and Chris Kunitz as well as prospect Joffrey Lupul earned valuable playing time with their farm team, the Cincinnati Mighty Ducks.

== Schedule ==
While the lockout led to the cancellation of the entire season, the Mighty Ducks had a schedule drawn up in case the season resumed at any time.

2004–05 schedule
Preseason

| Game | Date | Opponent | Time | Arena |
|---|---|---|---|---|
| 1 | September 24 | Phoenix Coyotes | 7:30p PDT | Arrowhead Pond of Anaheim |
| 2 | September 25 | @ Los Angeles Kings | 7:30p PDT | MGM Grand Garden Arena |
| 3 | September 29 | San Jose Sharks | 7:30p PDT | Arrowhead Pond of Anaheim |
| 4 | October 2 | @ San Jose Sharks | 7:30p PDT | HP Pavilion at San Jose |
| 5 | October 3 | Vancouver Canucks | 5:00p PDT | Arrowhead Pond of Anaheim |
| 6 | October 5 | @ Phoenix Coyotes | 7:00p PDT | Glendale Arena |
| 7 | October 8 | Los Angeles Kings | 7:30p PDT | Arrowhead Pond of Anaheim |

Regular season

| Game | Date | Opponent | Time | Arena |
|---|---|---|---|---|
| 1 | October 13 | Calgary Flames | 7:00p PDT | Arrowhead Pond of Anaheim |
| 2 | October 15 | San Jose Sharks | 7:30p PDT | Arrowhead Pond of Anaheim |
| 3 | October 17 | @ Los Angeles Kings | 5:00p PDT | Staples Center |
| 4 | October 20 | Los Angeles Kings | 7:30p PDT | Arrowhead Pond of Anaheim |
| 5 | October 23 | @ Nashville Predators | 5:00p PDT | Gaylord Entertainment Center |
| 6 | October 25 | @ Detroit Red Wings | 4:30p PDT | Joe Louis Arena |
| 7 | October 26 | @ Minnesota Wild | 5:00p PDT | Xcel Energy Center |
| 8 | October 28 | @ Chicago Blackhawks | 5:30p PDT | United Center |
| 9 | October 30 | @ Boston Bruins | 4:00p PDT | FleetCenter |
| 10 | November 3 | Atlanta Thrashers | 7:30p PST | Arrowhead Pond of Anaheim |
| 11 | November 5 | Pittsburgh Penguins | 7:30p PST | Arrowhead Pond of Anaheim |
| 12 | November 7 | @ Vancouver Canucks | 7:30p PST | General Motors Place |
| 13 | November 9 | @ Calgary Flames | 6:00p PST | Pengrowth Saddledome |
| 14 | November 12 | @ Chicago Blackhawks | 5:30p PST | United Center |
| 15 | November 13 | @ St. Louis Blues | 5:00p PST | Savvis Center |
| 16 | November 17 | Florida Panthers | 7:30p PST | Arrowhead Pond of Anaheim |
| 17 | November 19 | Detroit Red Wings | 7:30p PST | Arrowhead Pond of Anaheim |
| 18 | November 20 | @ Colorado Avalanche | 6:00p PST | Pepsi Center |
| 19 | November 23 | @ Dallas Stars | 5:30p PST | American Airlines Center |
| 20 | November 24 | @ Phoenix Coyotes | 6:00p PST | Glendale Arena |
| 21 | November 26 | Chicago Blackhawks | 1:00p PST | Arrowhead Pond of Anaheim |
| 22 | November 28 | Dallas Stars | 5:00p PST | Arrowhead Pond of Anaheim |
| 23 | December 1 | Washington Capitals | 7:30p PST | Arrowhead Pond of Anaheim |
| 24 | December 3 | @ Colorado Avalanche | 6:00p PST | Pepsi Center |
| 25 | December 8 | Carolina Hurricanes | 7:30p PST | Arrowhead Pond of Anaheim |
| 26 | December 12 | Edmonton Oilers | 5:00p PST | Arrowhead Pond of Anaheim |
| 27 | December 14 | @ Los Angeles Kings | 7:30p PST | Staples Center |
| 28 | December 15 | Nashville Predators | 7:30p PST | Arrowhead Pond of Anaheim |
| 29 | December 17 | Colorado Avalanche | 7:30p PST | Arrowhead Pond of Anaheim |
| 30 | December 19 | Los Angeles Kings | 5:00p PST | Arrowhead Pond of Anaheim |
| 31 | December 22 | @ Dallas Stars | 4:30p PST | American Airlines Center |
| 32 | December 23 | @ Nashville Predators | 5:00p PST | Gaylord Entertainment Center |
| 33 | December 26 | Phoenix Coyotes | 5:00p PST | Arrowhead Pond of Anaheim |
| 34 | December 28 | @ Columbus Blue Jackets | 4:00p PST | Nationwide Arena |
| 35 | December 30 | @ New York Islanders | 4:00p PST | Nassau Veterans Memorial Coliseum |
| 36 | December 31 | @ New Jersey Devils | 4:30p PST | Continental Airlines Arena |
| 37 | January 3 | @ New York Rangers | 4:00p PST | Madison Square Garden |
| 38 | January 5 | Tampa Bay Lightning | 7:30p PST | Arrowhead Pond of Anaheim |
| 39 | January 7 | Philadelphia Flyers | 7:30p PST | Arrowhead Pond of Anaheim |
| 40 | January 9 | Los Angeles Kings | 5:00p PST | Arrowhead Pond of Anaheim |
| 41 | January 11 | @ Los Angeles Kings | 7:30p PST | Staples Center |
| 42 | January 12 | St. Louis Blues | 7:30p PST | Arrowhead Pond of Anaheim |
| 43 | January 14 | Vancouver Canucks | 7:30p PST | Arrowhead Pond of Anaheim |
| 44 | January 17 | Columbus Blue Jackets | 1:00p PST | Arrowhead Pond of Anaheim |
| 45 | January 19 | San Jose Sharks | 7:30p PST | Arrowhead Pond of Anaheim |
| 46 | January 23 | @ Calgary Flames | 1:00p PST | Pengrowth Saddledome |
| 47 | January 24 | @ Edmonton Oilers | 6:00p PST | Rexall Place |
| 48 | January 26 | Nashville Predators | 7:30p PST | Arrowhead Pond of Anaheim |
| 49 | January 29 | @ Minnesota Wild | 10:30a PST | Xcel Energy Center |
| 50 | January 30 | @ Columbus Blue Jackets | 2:00p PST | Nationwide Arena |
| 51 | February 1 | @ Detroit Red Wings | 4:30p PST | Joe Louis Arena |
| 52 | February 3 | @ Philadelphia Flyers | 4:00p PST | Wachovia Center |
| 53 | February 5 | @ Florida Panthers | 4:00p PST | Office Depot Center |
| 54 | February 7 | @ Dallas Stars | 5:30p PST | American Airlines Center |
| 55 | February 10 | @ St. Louis Blues | 5:00p PST | Savvis Center |
| 56 | February 16 | Phoenix Coyotes | 7:30p PST | Arrowhead Pond of Anaheim |
| 57 | February 18 | Colorado Avalanche | 7:30p PST | Arrowhead Pond of Anaheim |
| 58 | February 20 | Minnesota Wild | 5:00p PST | Arrowhead Pond of Anaheim |
| 59 | February 23 | @ Phoenix Coyotes | 6:00p PST | Glendale Arena |
| 60 | February 25 | Dallas Stars | 7:30p PST | Arrowhead Pond of Anaheim |
| 61 | February 27 | St. Louis Blues | 5:00p PST | Arrowhead Pond of Anaheim |
| 62 | March 1 | @ San Jose Sharks | 7:30p PST | HP Pavilion at San Jose |
| 63 | March 2 | Minnesota Wild | 7:30p PST | Arrowhead Pond of Anaheim |
| 64 | March 4 | Buffalo Sabres | 7:30p PST | Arrowhead Pond of Anaheim |
| 65 | March 6 | Vancouver Canucks | 5:00p PST | Arrowhead Pond of Anaheim |
| 66 | March 8 | San Jose Sharks | 7:30p PST | Arrowhead Pond of Anaheim |
| 67 | March 11 | New York Rangers | 7:30p PST | Arrowhead Pond of Anaheim |
| 68 | March 13 | Chicago Blackhawks | 5:00p PST | Arrowhead Pond of Anaheim |
| 69 | March 15 | @ Toronto Maple Leafs | 4:30p PST | Air Canada Centre |
| 70 | March 17 | @ Ottawa Senators | 4:30p PST | Corel Centre |
| 71 | March 19 | @ Montreal Canadiens | 4:00p PST | Bell Centre |
| 72 | March 21 | Detroit Red Wings | 7:30p PST | Arrowhead Pond of Anaheim |
| 73 | March 23 | Edmonton Oilers | 7:30p PST | Arrowhead Pond of Anaheim |
| 74 | March 24 | @ San Jose Sharks | 7:30p PST | HP Pavilion at San Jose |
| 75 | March 26 | Dallas Stars | 7:30p PST | Arrowhead Pond of Anaheim |
| 76 | March 30 | Phoenix Coyotes | 7:30p PST | Arrowhead Pond of Anaheim |
| 77 | March 31 | @ Phoenix Coyotes | 6:00p PST | Glendale Arena |
| 78 | April 3 | @ Edmonton Oilers | 1:00p PDT | Rexall Place |
| 79 | April 4 | @ Vancouver Canucks | 7:00p PDT | General Motors Place |
| 80 | April 6 | Calgary Flames | 7:30p PDT | Arrowhead Pond of Anaheim |
| 81 | April 9 | @ San Jose Sharks | 2:00p PDT | HP Pavilion at San Jose |
| 82 | April 10 | Columbus Blue Jackets | 1:00p PDT | Arrowhead Pond of Anaheim |

== Transactions ==
The Mighty Ducks were involved in the following transactions during the 2004 offseason. No transactions were made during the lockout.

=== Trades ===
| Date | Details | | Ref |
|---|---|---|---|
| June 18, 2004 | To Carolina Hurricanes: Martin Gerber | To Mighty Ducks of Anaheim: Tomas Malec; 3rd-round pick in 2004 | |
| June 26, 2004 | To Atlanta Thrashers: Niclas Havelid | To Mighty Ducks of Anaheim: Kurtis Foster | |
| August 16, 2004 | To Tampa Bay Lightning: Vaclav Prospal | To Mighty Ducks of Anaheim: 2nd-round pick in 2005 | |

=== Players acquired ===
| Date | Player | Former team | Term | Via | Ref |
|---|---|---|---|---|---|
| September 1, 2004 | Zenon Konopka | Utah Grizzlies (AHL) | 2-year | Free agency | |

=== Players lost ===
| Date | Player | New team | Via (Note: In parentheses is the player's free agency group on July 1 if applicable.) | Ref |
|---|---|---|---|---|
| July 22, 2004 | Cam Severson | Nashville Predators | Free agency (UFA) | |
| August 24, 2004 | Jason Krog | EC VSV (EBEL) | Free agency (UFA) | |
| September 2004 | Petr Schastlivy | Lokomotiv Yaroslavl (RSL) | Free agency (UFA) | |
| September 8, 2004 | Brian Gornick | Syracuse Crunch (AHL) | Free agency (UFA) | |
| September 10, 2004 | Mike Mottau | Worcester IceCats (AHL) | Free agency (VI) | |
| September 28, 2004 | Dan Bylsma | | Retirement (III) (Note: Bylsma was hired as an assistant coach with the Cincinnati Mighty Ducks.) | |
| September 29, 2004 | Keith Aucoin | Memphis RiverKings (CHL) | Free agency (UFA) | |
| October 7, 2004 | Casey Hankinson | HC La Chaux-de-Fonds (NLB) | Free agency (VI) | |
| N/A | Nick Smith | Trondheim Black Panthers (Norway) | Free agency (VI) | |

=== Signings ===
| Date | Player | Term | Contract type | Ref |
|---|---|---|---|---|
| June 28, 2004 | Andy McDonald | 2-year | Re-signing | |
| June 30, 2004 | Keith Carney | 2-year | Option exercised | |
| July 8, 2004 | Ilya Bryzgalov | 1-year (Note: Club option for a second year.) | Re-signing | |
| July 9, 2004 | Garrett Burnett | 1-year | Re-signing | |
| July 12, 2004 | Vitaly Vishnevski | 2-year | Re-signing | |
| July 16, 2004 | Michael Holmqvist | 1-year | Re-signing | |
| July 31, 2004 | Rob Niedermayer | 1-year | Re-signing | |
| August 2, 2004 | Kurtis Foster | 1-year | Re-signing | |
| August 9, 2004 | Ruslan Salei | 1-year | Re-signing | |
| September 8, 2004 | Tim Brent | 3-year | Entry-level | |
| September 15, 2004 | Ryan Getzlaf | 3-year | Entry-level | |
| September 15, 2004 | Corey Perry | 3-year | Entry-level | |

== Draft picks ==
The Ducks picks at the 2004 NHL entry draft in Raleigh, North Carolina:

| Round | # | Player | Position | Nationality | College/Junior/Club team (League) |
|---|---|---|---|---|---|
| 1 | 9 | Ladislav Smid | Defense | Czech Republic | Bílí Tygři Liberec (Czech Republic) |
| 2 | 39 | Jordan Smith | Defense | Canada | Sault Ste. Marie Greyhounds (OHL) |
| 3 | 74 | Kyle Klubertanz | Defense | United States | Green Bay Gamblers (USHL) |
| 3 | 75 | Tim Brent | Center | Canada | Toronto St. Michael's Majors (OHL) |
| 6 | 172 | Matt Auffrey | Right wing | United States | US NTDP (NAHL) |
| 7 | 203 | Gabriel Bouthillette | Goaltender | Canada | Gatineau Olympiques (QMJHL) |
| 8 | 236 | Matt Christie | Center | Canada | Miami University (CCHA) |
| 9 | 269 | Janne Pesonen | Right wing | Finland | Oulun Kärpät (SM-liiga) |

== Minor league affiliates ==
- Cincinnati Mighty Ducks

== See also ==
- 2004–05 NHL season
- 2004–05 NHL lockout
