= 2004–05 Los Angeles Kings season =

National Hockey League team season

2004–05 Los Angeles Kings
- Division: Pacific
- Conference: Western
- 2004–05 record: Did not play

Team information
- General manager: Dave Taylor
- Coach: Andy Murray
- Captain: Mattias Norstrom
- Arena: Staples Center
- Minor league affiliates: Manchester Monarchs; Reading Royals

The 2004–05 Los Angeles Kings season would have been the King's 38th season in the National Hockey League (NHL). However, the 2004–05 NHL lockout cancelled all of the scheduled games for the season.

== Schedule ==
The Kings regular season schedules was announced on July 14, 2004.

2004–05 schedule
Preseason

| Game | Date | Opponent |
|---|---|---|
| 1 | September 23 | Phoenix Coyotes |
| 2 | September 25 | Anaheim Mighty Ducks |
| 3 | October 1 | @ Phoenix Coyotes |
| 4 | October 2 | @ Colorado Avalanche |
| 5 | October 6 | San Jose Sharks |
| 6 | October 8 | @ Anaheim Mighty Ducks |
| 7 | October 9 | Colorado Avalanche |

Regular season

| Game | Date | Opponent |
|---|---|---|
| 1 | October 13 | @ Colorado Avalanche |
| 2 | October 15 | Calgary Flames |
| 3 | October 17 | Anaheim Mighty Ducks |
| 4 | October 20 | @ Anaheim Mighty Ducks |
| 5 | October 23 | Phoenix Coyotes |
| 6 | October 26 | @ Toronto Maple Leafs |
| 7 | October 28 | @ Ottawa Senators |
| 8 | October 30 | @ New York Islanders |
| 9 | November 1 | @ New York Rangers |
| 10 | November 4 | Atlanta Thrashers |
| 11 | November 6 | Pittsburgh Penguins |
| 12 | November 9 | @ Detroit Red Wings |
| 13 | November 10 | @ Chicago Blackhawks |
| 14 | November 12 | @ Columbus Blue Jackets |
| 15 | November 14 | @ Florida Panthers |
| 16 | November 16 | @ Nashville Predators |
| 17 | November 18 | Florida Panthers |
| 18 | November 20 | Detroit Red Wings |
| 19 | November 26 | @ Phoenix Coyotes |
| 20 | November 27 | Chicago Blackhawks |
| 21 | November 30 | Dallas Stars |
| 22 | December 2 | Washington Capitals |
| 23 | December 4 | @ St. Louis Blues |
| 24 | December 5 | @ Chicago Blackhawks |
| 25 | December 7 | @ Minnesota Wild |
| 26 | December 9 | Carolina Hurricanes |
| 27 | December 11 | Edmonton Oilers |
| 28 | December 14 | Anaheim Mighty Ducks |
| 29 | December 16 | Nashville Predators |
| 30 | December 18 | Colorado Avalanche |
| 31 | December 19 | @ Anaheim Mighty Ducks |
| 32 | December 21 | @ Vancouver Canucks |
| 33 | December 23 | @ Edmonton Oilers |
| 34 | December 26 | @ San Jose Sharks |
| 35 | December 27 | San Jose Sharks |
| 36 | December 29 | @ Dallas Stars |
| 37 | January 1 | @ Nashville Predators |
| 38 | January 2 | @ St. Louis Blues |
| 39 | January 6 | Tampa Bay Lightning |
| 40 | January 8 | Philadelphia Flyers |
| 41 | January 9 | @ Anaheim Mighty Ducks |
| 42 | January 11 | Anaheim Mighty Ducks |
| 43 | January 13 | @ San Jose Sharks |
| 44 | January 15 | Vancouver Canucks |
| 45 | January 18 | Edmonton Oilers |
| 46 | January 20 | @ Phoenix Coyotes |
| 47 | January 22 | Columbus Blue Jackets |
| 48 | January 27 | San Jose Sharks |
| 49 | January 29 | Nashville Predators |
| 50 | January 31 | @ Dallas Stars |
| 51 | February 2 | @ New Jersey Devils |
| 52 | February 3 | @ Boston Bruins |
| 53 | February 5 | @ Montreal Canadiens |
| 54 | February 8 | @ Philadelphia Flyers |
| 55 | February 9 | @ Detroit Red Wings |
| 56 | February 16 | Calgary Flames |
| 57 | February 18 | Minnesota Wild |
| 58 | February 19 | Colorado Avalanche |
| 59 | February 21 | Phoenix Coyotes |
| 60 | February 23 | Dallas Stars |
| 61 | February 25 | @ Phoenix Coyotes |
| 62 | February 26 | St. Louis Blues |
| 63 | March 1 | Buffalo Sabres |
| 64 | March 3 | Minnesota Wild |
| 65 | March 5 | Vancouver Canucks |
| 66 | March 8 | @ Minnesota Wild |
| 67 | March 9 | @ Columbus Blue Jackets |
| 68 | March 11 | @ Dallas Stars |
| 69 | March 13 | Phoenix Coyotes |
| 70 | March 15 | Chicago Blackhawks |
| 71 | March 17 | New York Islanders |
| 72 | March 19 | St. Louis Blues |
| 73 | March 22 | Detroit Red Wings |
| 74 | March 24 | @ Calgary Flames |
| 75 | March 26 | @ Vancouver Canucks |
| 76 | March 28 | Dallas Stars |
| 77 | March 30 | San Jose Sharks |
| 78 | March 31 | @ San Jose Sharks |
| 79 | April 2 | @ Colorado Avalanche |
| 80 | April 4 | @ Calgary Flames |
| 81 | April 5 | @ Edmonton Oilers |
| 82 | April 9 | Columbus Blue Jackets |

== Transactions ==
The Kings were involved in the following transactions from June 8, 2004, the day after the deciding game of the 2004 Stanley Cup Finals, through February 16, 2005, the day the 2004–05 season was officially cancelled.

=== Trades ===
| Date | Details | | Ref |
|---|---|---|---|
| June 26, 2004 | To Los Angeles Kings: Radek Bonk | To Ottawa Senators: 3rd-round pick in 2004 | |
| June 26, 2004 | To Los Angeles Kings: Mathieu Garon; 3rd-round pick in 2004 | To Montreal Canadiens: Radek Bonk; Cristobal Huet | |
| June 27, 2004 | To Los Angeles Kings: 8th-round pick in 2005 (Note: This pick was later upgraded to a 7th-round pick when the draft was reduced to seven rounds.) | To Columbus Blue Jackets: 9th-round pick in 2004 | |
| June 27, 2004 | To Los Angeles Kings: Stephane Quintal | To Montreal Canadiens: Future considerations | |

=== Players acquired ===
| Date | Player | Former team | Term | Via | Ref |
|---|---|---|---|---|---|
| June 9, 2004 | Barry Brust | Calgary Hitmen (WHL) | 3-year* | Free agency | |
| July 6, 2004 | Craig Conroy | Calgary Flames | 4-year | Free agency | |
| July 8, 2004 | Adam Hauser | Manchester Monarchs (AHL) | 1-year* | Free agency | |
| July 16, 2004 | Brad Smyth | Karpat (Liiga) | 2-year | Free agency | |
| July 16, 2004 | Mike Weaver | Atlanta Thrashers | 1-year | Free agency | |
| August 2, 2004 | Matt Ryan | Guelph Storm (OHL) | 3-year* | Free agency | |

=== Players lost ===
| Date | Player | New team | Via (Note: In parentheses is the player’s free agency group on July 1 if applicable.) | Ref |
|---|---|---|---|---|
| July 1, 2004 | Jason Allison (Note: Allison was inactive during the 2004–05 season.) | | Contract expiration (UFA) | |
| July 1, 2004 | Anson Carter (Note: Carter was inactive during the 2004–05 season.) | | Contract expiration (UFA) | |
| July 1, 2004 | Brad Chartrand (Note: Chartrand retired.) | | Contract expiration (UFA) | |
| July 1, 2004 | Adam Deadmarsh (Note: Deadmarsh last played during the 2002–03 season and announced his retirement on September 22, 2005.) | | Contract expiration (UFA) | |
| July 1, 2004 | Jaroslav Modry | Atlanta Thrashers | Free agency (III) | |
| July 2, 2004 | Ian Laperriere | Colorado Avalanche | Free agency (V) | |
| July 22, 2004 | Jerred Smithson | Nashville Predators | Free agency (VI) | |
| July 26, 2004 | Bryan Muir | Modo Hockey (SHL) | Free agency (II) (Note: The Kings retained Muir’s NHL rights until trading them to the Washington Capitals on August 12, 2005.) | |
| August 13, 2004 | Richard Seeley | New York Islanders | Free agency (VI) | |
| August 28, 2004 | Zigmund Palffy | HC Slavia Praha (ELH) | Free agency (III) | |
| August 28, 2004 | Jozef Stumpel | HC Slavia Praha (ELH) | Free agency (III) | |
| August 31, 2004 | Tomas Zizka | Spartak Moscow (RSL) | Free agency (II) (Note: The Kings retained Zizka’s NHL rights through the 2007–08 season.) | |
| September 28, 2004 | Mathieu Chouinard | San Diego Gulls (ECHL) | Free agency (UFA) | |

=== Signings ===
| Date | Player | Term | Contract type | Ref |
|---|---|---|---|---|
| June 11, 2004 | Jason Holland | 1-year | Re-signing | |
| June 30, 2004 | Stephane Quintal | 1-year | Re-signing | |
| June 30, 2004 | Luc Robitaille | 1-year | Re-signing | |
| July 9, 2004 | Lubomir Visnovsky | 4-year | Re-signing | |
| July 13, 2004 | Joe Corvo | 1-year | Re-signing | |
| July 15, 2004 | Jeff Cowan | multi-year | Re-signing | |
| July 31, 2004 | Sean Avery | 2-year | Re-signing | |
| August 2, 2004 | Noah Clarke | 1-year | Re-signing | |
| August 5, 2004 | Scott Barney | 1-year | Re-signing | |
| August 5, 2004 | Joe Rullier | 1-year | Re-signing | |
| August 9, 2004 | Eric Belanger | 1-year | Re-signing | |
| August 9, 2004 | Ryan Flinn | 1-year | Re-signing | |
| September 14, 2004 | Konstantin Pushkarev | 3-year | Entry-level | |

== Draft picks ==
Los Angeles' draft picks at the 2004 NHL entry draft.

| Rd. | # | Player | Nationality | College/Junior/Club team |
|---|---|---|---|---|
| 1 | 11 | Lauri Tukonen (Right wing) | Finland | Blues (SM-liiga) |
| 3 | 95 | Paul Baier (Defense) | United States | Deerfield Academy (US High School) |
| 4 | 110 | Ned Lukacevic (Left wing) | Canada | Spokane Chiefs (WHL) |
| 5 | 143 | Eric Neilson (Right wing) | Canada | Rimouski Océanic (QMJHL) |
| 6 | 174 | Scott Parse (Left wing) | United States | University of Nebraska Omaha (CCHA) |
| 7 | 205 | Mike Curry (Right wing) | United States | Sioux Falls Stampede (USHL) |
| 7 | 221 | Daniel Taylor (Goaltender) | United Kingdom | Guelph Storm (OHL) |
| 8 | 238 | Yutaka Fukufuji (Goaltender) | Japan | Seibu Prince Rabbits (ALIH) |
| 9 | 264 | Valtteri Tenkanen (Center) | Finland | JYP (Finland) |
