= 2004–05 Atlanta Thrashers season =

National Hockey League team season

2004–05 Atlanta Thrashers
- Division: Southeast
- Conference: Eastern
- 2004–05 record: Did not play

Team information
- General manager: Don Waddell
- Coach: Bob Hartley
- Captain: Shawn McEachern
- Arena: Philips Arena
- Minor league affiliates: Chicago Wolves; Gwinnett Gladiators

The 2004–05 Atlanta Thrashers season was the 23rd season of operation for the National Hockey League franchise that was established on June 22, 1979, and 30th season for the organization overall.

== Regular season ==
No games were played during the 2004–05 NHL season due to the lock-out of the NHL players by the league, however teams business did occur, including the Thrashers' participation in the 2004 NHL entry draft that was held on June 26 in Raleigh, North Carolina.

== Schedule ==
The Thrashers preseason and regular season schedules were announced on July 14, 2004.

2004–05 schedule
Preseason

Game	Date	Opponent
1	September 26	Tampa Bay Lightning
2	September 27	@ Dallas Stars
3	September 29	Carolina Hurricanes
4	October 3	@ Carolina Hurricanes
5	October 5	@ Tampa Bay Lightning
6	October 8	Nashville Predators
7	October 9	@ Nashville Predators

Regular season

Game	Date	Opponent
1	October 14	@ Carolina Hurricanes
2	October 16	Washington Capitals
3	October 19	@ Washington Capitals
4	October 21	Buffalo Sabres
5	October 23	@ New York Rangers
6	October 27	@ Florida Panthers
7	October 29	Detroit Red Wings
8	October 30	@ Montreal Canadiens
9	November 3	@ Anaheim Mighty Ducks
10	November 4	@ Los Angeles Kings
11	November 6	@ San Jose Sharks
12	November 8	New Jersey Devils
13	November 10	Tampa Bay Lightning
14	November 12	@ Carolina Hurricanes
15	November 13	@ Tampa Bay Lightning
16	November 17	New York Rangers
17	November 19	New York Islanders
18	November 20	@ Boston Bruins
19	November 23	Vancouver Canucks
20	November 26	@ Philadelphia Flyers
21	November 27	New Jersey Devils
22	December 1	@ Colorado Avalanche
23	December 2	@ Phoenix Coyotes
24	December 4	@ Nashville Predators
25	December 7	Tampa Bay Lightning
26	December 10	Ottawa Senators
27	December 11	@ Washington Capitals
28	December 15	Carolina Hurricanes
29	December 16	@ Toronto Maple Leafs
30	December 18	@ Carolina Hurricanes
31	December 21	New York Rangers
32	December 27	Carolina Hurricanes
33	December 29	Columbus Blue Jackets
34	December 31	Washington Capitals
35	January 1	@ Ottawa Senators
36	January 4	@ New Jersey Devils
37	January 6	Toronto Maple Leafs
38	January 8	Washington Capitals
39	January 11	@ Buffalo Sabres
40	January 12	Nashville Predators
41	January 14	Minnesota Wild
42	January 17	@ Florida Panthers
43	January 19	Pittsburgh Penguins
44	January 21	Buffalo Sabres
45	January 23	Dallas Stars
46	January 24	@ Montreal Canadiens
47	January 27	@ New York Rangers
48	January 29	@ Philadelphia Flyers
49	January 30	@ Washington Capitals
50	February 2	Carolina Hurricanes
51	February 4	Florida Panthers
52	February 5	@ Tampa Bay Lightning
53	February 8	Boston Bruins
54	February 10	@ Minnesota Wild
55	February 15	@ New York Islanders
56	February 16	@ Chicago Blackhawks
57	February 19	@ Pittsburgh Penguins
58	February 20	@ Buffalo Sabres
59	February 24	@ Ottawa Senators
60	February 26	@ Toronto Maple Leafs
61	March 1	@ Pittsburgh Penguins
62	March 2	Philadelphia Flyers
63	March 4	Florida Panthers
64	March 6	Calgary Flames
65	March 7	@ New York Islanders
66	March 9	Ottawa Senators
67	March 11	Colorado Avalanche
68	March 13	Edmonton Oilers
69	March 15	Boston Bruins
70	March 17	@ New Jersey Devils
71	March 19	Pittsburgh Penguins
72	March 21	@ Florida Panthers
73	March 23	Montreal Canadiens
74	March 25	Toronto Maple Leafs
75	March 26	@ St. Louis Blues
76	March 28	Florida Panthers
77	March 31	Philadelphia Flyers
78	April 2	New York Islanders
79	April 4	@ Boston Bruins
80	April 6	Montreal Canadiens
81	April 8	@ Tampa Bay Lightning
82	April 10	Tampa Bay Lightning

== Transactions ==
The Thrashers were involved in the following transactions from June 8, 2004, the day after the deciding game of the 2004 Stanley Cup Final, through February 16, 2005, the day the 2004–05 season was officially canceled.

=== Trades ===
Date	Details		Ref
June 26, 2004	To Atlanta Thrashers: Niclas Havelid	To Mighty Ducks of Anaheim: Kurtis Foster	
June 26, 2004	To Atlanta Thrashers: 4th-round pick in 2004	To Carolina Hurricanes: 3rd-round pick in 2005	
June 27, 2004	To Atlanta Thrashers: Rights to Adam Berkhoel	To Chicago Blackhawks: Future considerations (Note: 7th-round pick in 2005.)	

=== Players acquired ===
Date	Player	Former team	Term	Via	Ref
June 30, 2004	Kevin Doell	Chicago Wolves (AHL)		Free agency	
July 1, 2004	Jaroslav Modry	Los Angeles Kings	3-year	Free agency	
July 14, 2004	Cory Larose	New York Rangers		Free agency	
July 14, 2004	Travis Roche	Minnesota Wild		Free agency	
July 26, 2004	Scott Mellanby	St. Louis Blues		Free agency	

=== Players lost ===
Date	Player	New team	Via (Note: In parentheses is the player’s free agency group on July 1 if applicable.)	Ref
July 1, 2004	Byron Dafoe (Note: Dafoe was inactive during the 2004–05 season.)		Contract expiration (III)	
July 1, 2004	Chris Tamer (Note: Tamer was inactive during the 2004–05 season.)		Contract expiration (III)	
July 9, 2004	Eric Healey	Adler Mannheim (DEL)	Free agency (VI)	
July 15, 2004	Frantisek Kaberle	Carolina Hurricanes	Free agency (UFA)	
July 16, 2004	Shawn Heins	Eisbaren Berlin (DEL)	Free agency (UFA)	
July 16, 2004	Mike Weaver	Los Angeles Kings	Free agency (VI)	
August 7, 2004	Daniel Corso	Kassel Huskies (DEL)	Free agency (UFA)	
August 19, 2004	Joe DiPenta	Vancouver Canucks	Free agency (VI)	
September 24, 2004	David Kaczowka	Peoria Rivermen (ECHL)	Free agency (UFA)	
September 28, 2004	Frederic Cassivi	Cincinnati Mighty Ducks (AHL)	Free agency (VI)	
November 19, 2004	Zdenek Blatny	Lahti Pelicans (Liiga)	Free agency (UFA)	
December 10, 2004	Bill Lindsay	Long Beach Ice Dogs (ECHL)	Free agency (III)	
January 13, 2005	Yannick Tremblay	Adler Mannheim (DEL)	Free agency (UFA)	

=== Signings ===
Date	Player	Term	Contract type	Ref
June 18, 2004	Jeff Dwyer		Entry-level	
June 18, 2004	Colin Stuart		Entry-level	
June 30, 2004	Serge Aubin		Re-signing	
June 30, 2004	Brad Larsen		Re-signing	
June 30, 2004	Ben Simon		Re-signing	
July 14, 2004	Adam Berkhoel		Entry-level	
July 15, 2004	Francis Lessard		Re-signing	
July 15, 2004	Tommi Santala		Re-signing	
July 28, 2004	Patrik Stefan		Re-signing	
July 29, 2004	Braydon Coburn		Entry-level	
August 2, 2004	Tomas Kloucek		Re-signing	
August 2, 2004	Derek MacKenzie		Re-signing	
August 2, 2004	Brian Maloney		Re-signing	
August 2, 2004	Kyle Rossiter		Re-signing	
August 2, 2004	Marc Savard	2-year	Re-signing	
August 2, 2004	Luke Sellars		Re-signing	
August 4, 2004	Ronald Petrovicky	2-year	Re-signing	
August 5, 2004	Garnet Exelby		Re-signing	
September 1, 2004	Kip Brennan		Re-signing	

== Draft picks ==
Atlanta's picks at the 2004 NHL entry draft, which was held at the RBC Center in Raleigh, North Carolina on June 26–27, 2004.

Round	Pick	Player	Position	Nationality	Team (league)
1	10	Boris Valabik	Defense	Slovakia	Kitchener Rangers (OHL)
2	40	Grant Lewis	Defense	United States	Dartmouth Big Green (ECAC Hockey)
3	76	Scott Lehman	Defense	Canada	Toronto St. Michael's Majors (OHL)
4	106	Chad Painchaud	Right wing	Canada	Mississauga IceDogs (OHL)
5	142	Juraj Gracik	Right wing	Slovakia	Topolcany (Slovakia)
6	186	Dan Turple	Goaltender	Canada	Oshawa Generals (OHL)
7	204	Miikka Tuomainen	Left wing	Finland	TuTo (Mestis)
8	237	Mitch Carefoot	Center	Canada	Cornell Big Red (ECAC Hockey)
9	270	Matt Siddall	Right wing	Canada	Powell River Kings (BCHL)
