= List of Anaheim Ducks seasons =

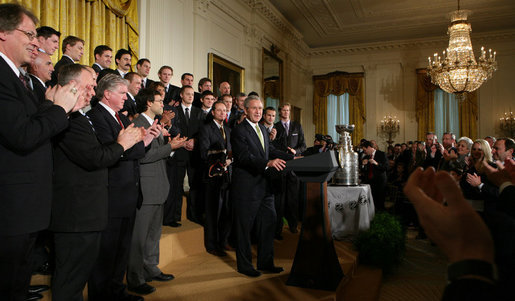
The 2007 Stanley Cup champion Ducks meet U.S. President George W. Bush at the White House.

The Anaheim Ducks are a professional ice hockey team based in Anaheim, California. They are members of the Pacific Division of the Western Conference of the National Hockey League (NHL). The club was founded in 1993 by The Walt Disney Company as the Mighty Ducks of Anaheim, a name based on the 1992 film The Mighty Ducks. Disney sold the franchise in 2005 to Henry Samueli, who, along with General Manager Brian Burke, changed the name of the team to the Anaheim Ducks prior to the 2006–07 season. In thirty-two completed seasons (2004–05 NHL season was not played) the Ducks have made the playoffs fifteen times and won six Pacific Division titles, two Western Conference championships, and one Stanley Cup championship.

== Table key ==
Key of colors and symbols
Color/symbol	Explanation
†	Stanley Cup champions
‡	Conference champions
↑	Division champions
#	Led league in points

Key of terms and abbreviations
Term or abbreviation	Definition
Finish	Final position in division or league standings
GP	Number of games played
W	Number of wins
L	Number of losses
T	Number of ties
OT	Number of losses in overtime (since the 1999–2000 season)
Pts	Number of points
GF	Goals for (goals scored by the Ducks)
GA	Goals against (goals scored by the Ducks' opponents)
—	Does not apply

== Year by year ==
Season	Ducks season	Conference	Division	Regular season									Postseason					
Season	Ducks season	Conference	Division	Finish	GP	W	L	T	OT	Pts	GF	GA	GP	W	L	GF	GA	Result
Mighty Ducks of Anaheim
1993–94	1993–94	Western	Pacific	4th	84	33	46	5	—	71	229	251	—	—	—	—	—	Did not qualify
1994–95^{1}	1994–95	Western	Pacific	6th	48	16	27	5	—	37	125	164	—	—	—	—	—	Did not qualify
1995–96	1995–96	Western	Pacific	4th	82	35	39	8	—	78	234	247	—	—	—	—	—	Did not qualify
1996–97	1996–97	Western	Pacific	2nd	82	36	33	13	—	85	243	233	11	4	7	25	30	Won in conference quarterfinals, 4–3 (Coyotes); Lost in conference semifinals, 0–4 (Red Wings)
1997–98	1997–98	Western	Pacific	6th	82	26	43	13	—	65	205	261	—	—	—	—	—	Did not qualify
1998–99	1998–99	Western	Pacific	3rd	82	35	34	13	—	83	215	206	4	0	4	6	17	Lost in conference quarterfinals, 0–4 (Red Wings)
1999–2000	1999–2000	Western	Pacific	5th	82	34	33	12	3	83	217	227	—	—	—	—	—	Did not qualify
2000–01	2000–01	Western	Pacific	5th	82	25	41	11	5	66	188	245	—	—	—	—	—	Did not qualify
2001–02	2001–02	Western	Pacific	5th	82	29	42	8	3	69	175	198	—	—	—	—	—	Did not qualify
2002–03	2002–03	Western‡	Pacific	2nd	82	40	27	9	6	95	203	193	21	15	6	45	40	Won in conference quarterfinals, 4–0 (Red Wings); Won in conference semifinals, 4–2 (Stars); Won in conference finals, 4–0 (Wild); Lost in Stanley Cup Final, 3–4 (Devils)
2003–04	2003–04	Western	Pacific	4th	82	29	35	10	8	76	184	213	—	—	—	—	—	Did not qualify
2004–05^{2}	2004–05	Season cancelled due to 2004–05 NHL lockout																
2005–06^{3}	2005–06	Western	Pacific	3rd	82	43	27	—	12	98	251	222	16	9	7	46	36	Won in conference quarterfinals, 4–3 (Flames); Won in conference semifinals, 4–0 (Avalanche); Lost in conference finals, 1–4 (Oilers)
Anaheim Ducks
2006–07	2006–07	Western‡	Pacific↑	1st	82	48	20	—	14	110	254	198	21	16	5	58	45	Won in conference quarterfinals, 4–1 (Wild); Won in conference semifinals, 4–1 (Canucks); Won in conference finals, 4–2 (Red Wings); Won in Stanley Cup Final, 4–1 (Senators)†
2007–08	2007–08	Western	Pacific	2nd	82	47	27	—	8	102	197	184	6	2	4	13	20	Lost in conference quarterfinals, 2–4 (Stars)
2008–09	2008–09	Western	Pacific	2nd	82	42	33	—	7	91	238	235	13	7	6	35	32	Won in conference quarterfinals, 4–2 (Sharks); Lost in conference semifinals, 3–4 (Red Wings)
2009–10	2009–10	Western	Pacific	4th	82	39	32	—	11	89	233	243	—	—	—	—	—	Did not qualify
2010–11	2010–11	Western	Pacific	2nd	82	47	30	—	5	99	235	233	6	2	4	20	22	Lost in conference quarterfinals, 2–4 (Predators)
2011–12	2011–12	Western	Pacific	5th	82	34	36	—	12	80	201	224	—	—	—	—	—	Did not qualify
2012–13^{4}	2012–13	Western	Pacific↑	1st	48	30	12	—	6	66	134	115	7	3	4	21	18	Lost in conference quarterfinals, 3–4 (Red Wings)
2013–14	2013–14	Western	Pacific↑	1st	82	54	20	—	8	116	263	203	13	7	6	35	37	Won in first round, 4–2 (Stars); Lost in second round, 3–4 (Kings)
2014–15	2014–15	Western	Pacific↑	1st	82	51	24	—	7	109	228	221	16	11	5	57	42	Won in first round, 4–0 (Jets); Won in second round, 4–1 (Flames); Lost in conference finals, 3–4 (Blackhawks)
2015–16	2015–16	Western	Pacific↑	1st	82	46	25	—	11	103	215	188	7	3	4	18	14	Lost in first round, 3–4 (Predators)
2016–17	2016–17	Western	Pacific↑	1st	82	46	23	—	13	105	220	197	17	10	7	50	52	Won in first round, 4–0 (Flames); Won in second round, 4–3 (Oilers); Lost in conference finals, 2–4 (Predators)
2017–18	2017–18	Western	Pacific	2nd	82	44	25	—	13	101	231	209	4	0	4	4	16	Lost in first round, 0–4 (Sharks)
2018–19	2018–19	Western	Pacific	6th	82	35	37	—	10	80	196	248	—	—	—	—	—	Did not qualify
2019–20^{5}	2019–20	Western	Pacific	6th	71	29	33	—	9	67	182	225	—	—	—	—	—	Did not qualify
2020–21^{6}	2020–21	—	West	8th	56	17	30	—	9	43	124	177	—	—	—	—	—	Did not qualify
2021–22	2021–22	Western	Pacific	7th	82	31	37	—	14	76	228	266	—	—	—	—	—	Did not qualify
2022–23	2022–23	Western	Pacific	8th	82	23	47	—	12	58	206	335	—	—	—	—	—	Did not qualify
2023–24	2023–24	Western	Pacific	7th	82	27	50	—	5	59	203	293	—	—	—	—	—	Did not qualify
2024–25	2024–25	Western	Pacific	6th	82	35	37	—	10	80	217	261	—	—	—	—	—	Did not qualify
2025–26	2025-26	Western	Pacific	3rd	82	43	33	6	—	92	265	288	12	6	6	39	42	Won in first round 4-2 (Oilers). Lost in second round 2-4 (Golden Knights)
Totals					2,439	1,106	1,005	107	221	2,540	6,559	7,005	174	95	79	472	463	15 playoff appearances

^{1} Season was shortened due to the 1994–95 NHL lockout.
^{2} Season was cancelled due to the 2004–05 NHL lockout.
^{3} As of the 2005–06 NHL season, all games tied after regulation will be decided in a shootout; SOL (Shootout losses) will be recorded as OTL in the standings.
^{4} The 2012–13 NHL season was shortened due to the 2012–13 NHL lockout.
^{5} The 2019–20 NHL season was suspended on March 12, 2020 due to the COVID-19 pandemic.
^{6} The 2020–21 NHL season was shortened due to the COVID-19 pandemic.

=== All-time records ===
Statistic	GP	W	L	T	OT
Regular season record (1993–present)	2,439	1,106	1,005	107	221
Postseason record (1993–present)	162	89	73	—	—
All-time regular and postseason record	2,601	1,195	1,078	107	221
All-time series record: 16–13
