= 2004–05 St. Louis Blues season =

National Hockey League team season

2004–05 St. Louis Blues
- Division: Central
- Conference: Western
- 2004–05 record: Did not play

Team information
- General manager: Larry Pleau
- Coach: Mike Kitchen
- Captain: Vacant
- Arena: Savvis Center
- Minor league affiliates: Worcester IceCats; Peoria Rivermen

The 2004–05 St. Louis Blues season was the 38th for the National Hockey League (NHL) franchise. However, its games were cancelled because of the lockout, that lasted from September 16, 2004 until July 22, 2005.

== Schedule ==
The Blues preseason and regular season schedules were announced on July 14, 2004.

2004–05 schedule
Preseason

Game	Date	Opponent
1	September 24	Nashville Predators
2	September 25	@ Nashville Predators
3	September 28	Dallas Stars
4	October 2	Chicago Blackhawks
5	October 8	@ Chicago Blackhawks
6	October 9	@ Dallas Stars

Regular season

Game	Date	Opponent
1	October 15	Chicago Blackhawks
2	October 16	@ Nashville Predators
3	October 20	@ Vancouver Canucks
4	October 21	@ Calgary Flames
5	October 23	@ Edmonton Oilers
6	October 26	Buffalo Sabres
7	October 29	@ New Jersey Devils
8	October 30	San Jose Sharks
9	November 1	Columbus Blue Jackets
10	November 4	New York Islanders
11	November 6	Montreal Canadiens
12	November 8	@ Philadelphia Flyers
13	November 11	Colorado Avalanche
14	November 13	Anaheim Mighty Ducks
15	November 17	@ Minnesota Wild
16	November 18	@ Colorado Avalanche
17	November 20	@ Phoenix Coyotes
18	November 23	Calgary Flames
19	November 26	@ Columbus Blue Jackets
20	November 27	Detroit Red Wings
21	December 1	@ Florida Panthers
22	December 2	@ Tampa Bay Lightning
23	December 4	Los Angeles Kings
24	December 6	@ Detroit Red Wings
25	December 8	Nashville Predators
26	December 9	@ Pittsburgh Penguins
27	December 11	Columbus Blue Jackets
28	December 15	@ Dallas Stars
29	December 16	Pittsburgh Penguins
30	December 18	Phoenix Coyotes
31	December 22	@ Washington Capitals
32	December 23	@ Boston Bruins
33	December 26	Detroit Red Wings
34	December 28	Toronto Maple Leafs
35	December 30	Colorado Avalanche
36	December 31	@ Columbus Blue Jackets
37	January 2	Los Angeles Kings
38	January 4	Vancouver Canucks
39	January 6	Edmonton Oilers
40	January 8	Minnesota Wild
41	January 10	@ Nashville Predators
42	January 12	@ Anaheim Mighty Ducks
43	January 15	@ San Jose Sharks
44	January 17	@ Phoenix Coyotes
45	January 20	Washington Capitals
46	January 22	Chicago Blackhawks
47	January 24	@ New York Rangers
48	January 25	@ Buffalo Sabres
49	January 29	Phoenix Coyotes
50	January 30	@ Chicago Blackhawks
51	February 1	Columbus Blue Jackets
52	February 3	Carolina Hurricanes
53	February 5	Dallas Stars
54	February 7	@ Minnesota Wild
55	February 9	@ Colorado Avalanche
56	February 10	Anaheim Mighty Ducks
57	February 15	Nashville Predators
58	February 17	@ Detroit Red Wings
59	February 19	Dallas Stars
60	February 21	San Jose Sharks
61	February 24	Vancouver Canucks
62	February 26	@ Los Angeles Kings
63	February 27	@ Anaheim Mighty Ducks
64	March 1	Calgary Flames
65	March 3	Edmonton Oilers
66	March 5	@ Columbus Blue Jackets
67	March 6	@ Chicago Blackhawks
68	March 10	@ Vancouver Canucks
69	March 12	@ Calgary Flames
70	March 15	@ Edmonton Oilers
71	March 17	@ San Jose Sharks
72	March 19	@ Los Angeles Kings
73	March 22	Ottawa Senators
74	March 24	@ Detroit Red Wings
75	March 26	Atlanta Thrashers
76	March 29	Detroit Red Wings
77	March 31	Minnesota Wild
78	April 2	@ Nashville Predators
79	April 3	Nashville Predators
80	April 6	@ Chicago Blackhawks
81	April 9	Chicago Blackhawks
82	April 10	@ Dallas Stars

== Transactions ==
The Blues were involved in the following transactions from June 8, 2004, the day after the deciding game of the 2004 Stanley Cup Finals, through February 16, 2005, the day the 2004–05 season was officially cancelled.

=== Trades ===
Date	Details		Ref
June 25, 2004	To St. Louis Blues: Jason Bacashihua	To Dallas Stars: Rights to Shawn Belle	
July 27, 2004	To St. Louis Blues: Patrick Lalime	To Ottawa Senators: Conditional 4th-round pick in 2005	

=== Players acquired ===
Date	Player	Former team	Term	Via	Ref
June 30, 2004	Jon DiSalvatore	Cleveland Barons (AHL)		Free agency	
June 30, 2004	Andy Roach	Adler Mannheim (DEL)		Free agency	
June 30, 2004	Patrick Wellar	Calgary Hitmen (WHL)		Free agency	
June 30, 2004	Dennis Wideman	London Knights (OHL)		Free agency	

=== Players lost ===
Date	Player	New team	Via (Note: In parentheses is the player’s free agency group on July 1 if applicable.)	Ref
June 2004	Brian Savage	Phoenix Coyotes	Waivers	
July 1, 2004	Murray Baron (Note: Baron retired.)		Contract expiration (III)	
July 1, 2004	Mike Danton (Note: Danton pled guilty to a conspiracy to commit murder charge on July 16, 2004 and served 63 months in prison. He resumed his pro hockey career during the 2011–12 season.)		Contract expiration (UFA)	
July 1, 2004	Jeff Finley (Note: Finley was inactive during the 2004–05 season.)		Contract expiration (III)	
July 1, 2004	Al MacInnis (Note: MacInnis was inactive during the 2004–05 season and announced his retirement on September 9, 2005.)		Contract expiration (III)	
July 1, 2004	Chris Osgood (Note: Osgood was inactive during the 2004–05 season.)		Contract expiration (III)	
July 1, 2004	Scott Pellerin (Note: Pellerin retired.)		Contract expiration (III)	
July 26, 2004	Scott Mellanby	Atlanta Thrashers	Free agency (III)	
July 28, 2004	Steve McLaren	Tampa Bay Lightning	Free agency (VI)	
August 13, 2004	Pascal Rheaume	New Jersey Devils	Free agency (III)	
August 15, 2004	Marc Brown	Augsburger Panther (DEL)	Free agency (VI)	
August 23, 2004	Ryan Ready	Philadelphia Flyers	Free agency (VI)	
September 7, 2004	Steve Martins	JYP Jyvaskyla (Liiga)	Free agency (III)	
September 7, 2004	Jeff Panzer	Columbus Blue Jackets	Waivers	
September 17, 2004	Pavol Demitra	HK Dukla Trencin (Slovakia)	Free agency (UFA)	
October 7, 2004	Cody Rudkowsky	Reading Royals (ECHL)	Free agency (VI)	

=== Signings ===
Date	Player	Term	Contract type	Ref
June 29, 2004	Eric Boguniecki		Re-signing	
June 29, 2004	Trevor Byrne		Re-signing	
June 29, 2004	Reinhard Divis		Re-signing	
June 29, 2004	Blake Evans		Re-signing	
June 29, 2004	Mike Glumac		Re-signing	
June 29, 2004	Aaron MacKenzie		Re-signing	
June 29, 2004	John Pohl		Re-signing	
June 29, 2004	Mark Rycroft		Re-signing	
June 30, 2004	Dallas Drake		Re-signing	
June 30, 2004	Alexander Khavanov		Re-signing	
June 30, 2004	D. J. King		Entry-level	
June 30, 2004	Ryan Johnson		Re-signing	
July 6, 2004	Eric Weinrich		Re-signing	
July 12, 2004	Mike Sillinger		Re-signing	
July 15, 2004	Patrick Lalime	1-year (Note: Club option for a second year.)	Re-signing	
July 15, 2004	Jamal Mayers	1-year	Re-signing	
July 30, 2004	Chris Pronger	1-year	Re-signing	
August 5, 2004	Petr Cajanek		Re-signing	
September 10, 2004	Christian Backman		Re-signing	
September 10, 2004	Chris Beckford-Tseu		Entry-level	
September 10, 2004	Erkki Rajamaki		Entry-level	
September 10, 2004	Curtis Sanford		Re-signing	
September 10, 2004	Konstantin Zakharov		Entry-level	
September 13, 2004	Barret Jackman		Re-signing	

== Draft picks ==
St. Louis' picks at the 2004 NHL entry draft, which was held at the RBC Center in Raleigh, North Carolina on June 26–27, 2004.

Round	Pick	Player	Position	Nationality	Team (league)
1	17	Marek Schwarz	Goaltender	Czech Republic	Sparta Prague (Czech Extraliga)
2	49	Carl Soderberg	Center	Sweden	Malmö Redhawks (SEL)
3	83	Viktor Alexandrov	Right wing	Kazakhstan	Metallurg Novokuznetsk (RSL)
4	116	Michal Birner	Left wing	Czech Republic	Slavia Prague Jr. (Czech Republic)
5	136	Nikita Nikitin	Defense	Russia	Avangard Omsk Jr. (Russia)
6	180	Roman Polak	Defense	Czech Republic	HC Vítkovice Jr. (Czech Republic)
7	211	David Fredriksson	Wing	Sweden	HV71 Jr. (Sweden)
9	277	Jonathan Boutin	Right wing	Canada	Shawinigan Cataractes (QMJHL)
