= 2004–05 Detroit Red Wings season =

Sports season

2004–05 Detroit Red Wings
- Division: Central
- Conference: Western
- 2004–05 record: Did not play

Team information
- General manager: Ken Holland
- Coach: Dave Lewis
- Captain: Steve Yzerman
- Alternate captains: Nicklas Lidstrom; Brendan Shanahan
- Arena: Joe Louis Arena
- Minor league affiliates: Grand Rapids Griffins; Toledo Storm

The 2004–05 Detroit Red Wings season would have been their 79th National Hockey League season; however, it was cancelled as the 2004–05 NHL lockout could not be resolved in time to save the season.

== Schedule ==
The Red Wings regular season schedule was announced on July 14, 2004.

2004–05 schedule
Preseason

Game	Date	Opponent
1	September 26	Boston Bruins
2	September 28	@ Colorado Avalanche
3	September 30	@ Boston Bruins
4	October 1	@ Toronto Maple Leafs
5	October 2	@ Dallas Stars
6	October 5	Colorado Avalanche
7	October 7	@ Dallas Stars
8	October 9	Toronto Maple Leafs
9	October 10	@ New York Rangers

Regular season

Game	Date	Opponent
1	October 14	@ Edmonton Oilers
2	October 16	@ Vancouver Canucks
3	October 20	Carolina Hurricanes
4	October 22	Chicago Blackhawks
5	October 23	@ New Jersey Devils
6	October 25	Anaheim Mighty Ducks
7	October 27	Dallas Stars
8	October 29	@ Atlanta Thrashers
9	October 30	@ Nashville Predators
10	November 2	Edmonton Oilers
11	November 5	@ Columbus Blue Jackets
12	November 6	Phoenix Coyotes
13	November 9	Los Angeles Kings
14	November 11	@ Washington Capitals
15	November 13	Columbus Blue Jackets
16	November 17	@ San Jose Sharks
17	November 19	@ Anaheim Mighty Ducks
18	November 20	@ Los Angeles Kings
19	November 24	Calgary Flames
20	November 26	Minnesota Wild
21	November 27	@ St. Louis Blues
22	November 29	San Jose Sharks
23	December 1	Columbus Blue Jackets
24	December 3	Chicago Blackhawks
25	December 4	@ Pittsburgh Penguins
26	December 6	St. Louis Blues
27	December 8	@ Colorado Avalanche
28	December 10	@ Vancouver Canucks
29	December 11	@ Calgary Flames
30	December 14	Chicago Blackhawks
31	December 16	Vancouver Canucks
32	December 17	@ Chicago Blackhawks
33	December 19	Ottawa Senators
34	December 21	New York Islanders
35	December 26	@ St. Louis Blues
36	December 27	@ Dallas Stars
37	December 29	@ Phoenix Coyotes
38	December 31	Vancouver Canucks
39	January 2	@ New York Islanders
40	January 5	Nashville Predators
41	January 8	@ Colorado Avalanche
42	January 9	@ Chicago Blackhawks
43	January 11	@ Boston Bruins
44	January 13	Nashville Predators
45	January 15	Toronto Maple Leafs
46	January 17	Dallas Stars
47	January 19	Calgary Flames
48	January 21	@ Dallas Stars
49	January 22	@ Phoenix Coyotes
50	January 26	@ Chicago Blackhawks
51	January 29	Colorado Avalanche
52	February 1	Anaheim Mighty Ducks
53	February 3	@ Edmonton Oilers
54	February 5	@ Calgary Flames
55	February 9	Los Angeles Kings
56	February 15	Buffalo Sabres
57	February 17	St. Louis Blues
58	February 19	@ Tampa Bay Lightning
59	February 20	@ Florida Panthers
60	February 23	New Jersey Devils
61	February 26	San Jose Sharks
62	February 27	@ Nashville Predators
63	March 1	Edmonton Oilers
64	March 3	Montreal Canadiens
65	March 5	Pittsburgh Penguins
66	March 8	Phoenix Coyotes
67	March 10	@ Minnesota Wild
68	March 11	@ Columbus Blue Jackets
69	March 13	Colorado Avalanche
70	March 16	Nashville Predators
71	March 19	@ San Jose Sharks
72	March 21	@ Anaheim Mighty Ducks
73	March 22	@ Los Angeles Kings
74	March 24	St. Louis Blues
75	March 26	New York Rangers
76	March 28	@ St. Louis Blues
77	March 31	@ Nashville Predators
78	April 1	Columbus Blue Jackets
79	April 3	@ Philadelphia Flyers
80	April 6	@ Columbus Blue Jackets
81	April 8	Minnesota Wild
82	April 10	@ Minnesota Wild

== Transactions ==
The Red Wings were involved in the following transactions from June 8, 2004, the day after the deciding game of the 2004 Stanley Cup Finals, through February 16, 2005, the day the 2004–05 season was officially cancelled.

=== Trades ===
The Red Wings did not make any trades.

=== Players acquired ===
Date	Player	Former team	Term	Via	Ref
July 21, 2004	Bryan Helmer	Phoenix Coyotes		Free agency	
July 21, 2004	Eric Himelfarb	Grand Rapids Griffins (AHL)		Free agency	
July 21, 2004	Brett Lebda	Grand Rapids Griffins (AHL)		Free agency	
July 21, 2004	Eric Manlow	New York Islanders		Free agency	
August 16, 2004	Pete Vandermeer	Philadelphia Flyers		Free agency	

=== Players lost ===
Date	Player	New team	Via (Note: In parentheses is the player’s free agency group on July 1 if applicable.)	Ref
June 14, 2004	Marc Lamothe	Lokomotiv Yaroslavl (RSL)	Free agency (VI)	
July 1, 2004	Derek King (Note: King retired.)		Contract expiration (III)	
July 1, 2004	Steve Thomas (Note: Thomas retired.)		Contract expiration (III)	
July 5, 2004	Boyd Devereaux	Phoenix Coyotes	Free agency (UFA)	
July 6, 2004	Dominik Hasek	Ottawa Senators	Free agency (III)	
August 6, 2004	Brett Hull	Phoenix Coyotes	Free agency (III)	
September 15, 2004	Anders Myrvold	Valerenga IF (GET)	Free agency (VI)	
September 24, 2004	Michel Picard	Thetford Mines Prolab (LNAH)	Free agency (III)	
October 2004	Ryan Barnes	Kalamazoo Wings (UHL)	Free agency (UFA)	
March 3, 2005	Kevin Miller	Flint Generals (UHL)	Free agency (III)	

=== Signings ===
Date	Player	Term	Contract type	Ref
June 27, 2004	Mark Mowers	1-year (Note: Player option for a second year.)	Re-signing	
June 27, 2004	Jamie Rivers	2-year	Re-signing	
July 1, 2004	Kris Draper	4-year	Re-signing	
July 22, 2004	Brendan Shanahan	1-year	Re-signing	
July 28, 2004	Mathieu Dandenault	1-year	Re-signing	
July 29, 2004	Jason Williams	1-year	Re-signing	
August 2, 2004	Jiri Fischer	3-year	Re-signing	
September 14, 2004	Steve Yzerman	1-year	Re-signing	

== Draft picks ==
Detroit's picks at the 2004 NHL entry draft, which was held at the RBC Center in Raleigh, North Carolina on June 26–27, 2004.

Round	Pick	Player	Position	Nationality	Team (league)
3	97	Johan Franzen	Right wing	Sweden	Linköpings HC (SEL)
4	128	Evan McGrath	Center	Canada	Kitchener Rangers (OHL)
5	151	Sergei Kolosov	Defense	Belarus	Dinamo Minsk (Belarus)
5	162	Tyler Haskins	Center	United States	Toronto St. Michael's Majors (OHL)
6	192	Anton Axelsson	Left wing	Sweden	Frölunda HC Jrs. (Sweden)
7	226	Steve Covington	Right wing	Canada	Calgary Hitmen (WHL)
8	257	Gennady Stolyarov	Right wing	Russia	THK Tver (Russia)
9	290	Nils Backstrom	Defense	Sweden	Stocksunds IF (Sweden)
