= 2004–05 Colorado Avalanche season =

National Hockey League team season

2004–05 Colorado Avalanche
- Division: Northwest
- Conference: Western
- 2004–05 record: Did not play

Team information
- General manager: Pierre Lacroix
- Coach: Joel Quenneville
- Captain: Joe Sakic
- Arena: Pepsi Center
- Minor league affiliate: Hershey Bears

The 2004–05 Colorado Avalanche season was cancelled due to the lock-out of the players of the National Hockey League. It would have been the 10th playing season since the franchise relocated from Quebec prior to the start of the 1995–96 NHL season. As well as the franchise's 26th season in the National Hockey League and 33rd season overall. The Avalanche would commemorate their 10th anniversary in the 2005-06 season.

== Off-season ==
Joel Quenneville was named the team’s new head coach on July 7, 2004. His predecessor, Tony Granato, remained with the club as an assistant coach.

== Schedule ==
Colorado’s preseason and regular season schedules were announced on July 14, 2004.

2004–05 schedule
Preseason

Game	Date	Opponent
1	September 25	Dallas Stars
2	September 28	Detroit Red Wings
3	September 30	@ Dallas Stars
4	October 2	Los Angeles Kings
5	October 5	@ Detroit Red Wings
6	October 9	@ Los Angeles Kings

Regular season

Game	Date	Opponent
1	October 13	Los Angeles Kings
2	October 16	@ San Jose Sharks
3	October 17	Boston Bruins
4	October 20	@ Chicago Blackhawks
5	October 21	@ Columbus Blue Jackets
6	October 23	Tampa Bay Lightning
7	October 27	Phoenix Coyotes
8	October 29	Calgary Flames
9	October 30	Vancouver Canucks
10	November 2	@ Vancouver Canucks
11	November 4	@ Calgary Flames
12	November 5	@ Minnesota Wild
13	November 8	Pittsburgh Penguins
14	November 10	Vancouver Canucks
15	November 11	@ St. Louis Blues
16	November 13	@ Nashville Predators
17	November 16	Edmonton Oilers
18	November 18	St. Louis Blues
19	November 20	Anaheim Mighty Ducks
20	November 22	Columbus Blue Jackets
21	November 26	@ Calgary Flames
22	November 27	@ Edmonton Oilers
23	December 1	Atlanta Thrashers
24	December 3	Anaheim Mighty Ducks
25	December 5	Calgary Flames
26	December 8	Detroit Red Wings
27	December 10	Chicago Blackhawks
28	December 11	@ Nashville Predators
29	December 13	Florida Panthers
30	December 15	@ Phoenix Coyotes
31	December 17	@ Anaheim Mighty Ducks
32	December 18	@ Los Angeles Kings
33	December 23	Ottawa Senators
34	December 26	@ Chicago Blackhawks
35	December 27	Toronto Maple Leafs
36	December 30	@ St. Louis Blues
37	December 31	@ Dallas Stars
38	January 2	Phoenix Coyotes
39	January 4	Edmonton Oilers
40	January 6	Vancouver Canucks
41	January 8	Detroit Red Wings
42	January 11	@ New York Islanders
43	January 12	@ New Jersey Devils
44	January 14	@ Columbus Blue Jackets
45	January 17	@ Boston Bruins
46	January 19	Montreal Canadiens
47	January 22	San Jose Sharks
48	January 26	Dallas Stars
49	January 27	@ Minnesota Wild
50	January 29	@ Detroit Red Wings
51	January 31	@ Vancouver Canucks
52	February 1	@ Edmonton Oilers
53	February 4	Minnesota Wild
54	February 7	Carolina Hurricanes
55	February 9	St. Louis Blues
56	February 16	@ Dallas Stars
57	February 18	@ Anaheim Mighty Ducks
58	February 19	@ Los Angeles Kings
59	February 22	Minnesota Wild
60	February 24	@ Washington Capitals
61	February 26	@ Philadelphia Flyers
62	February 27	@ New York Rangers
63	March 2	Nashville Predators
64	March 4	Dallas Stars
65	March 6	San Jose Sharks
66	March 10	@ Carolina Hurricanes
67	March 11	@ Atlanta Thrashers
68	March 13	@ Detroit Red Wings
69	March 15	@ Buffalo Sabres
70	March 17	Edmonton Oilers
71	March 19	Calgary Flames
72	March 21	@ Edmonton Oilers
73	March 22	@ Vancouver Canucks
74	March 25	Columbus Blue Jackets
75	March 26	@ Phoenix Coyotes
76	March 28	@ San Jose Sharks
77	March 31	Chicago Blackhawks
78	April 2	Los Angeles Kings
79	April 4	@ Minnesota Wild
80	April 6	Minnesota Wild
81	April 8	Nashville Predators
82	April 10	@ Calgary Flames

== Transactions ==
The Avalanche were involved in the following transactions from June 8, 2004, the day after the deciding game of the 2004 Stanley Cup Finals, through February 16, 2005, the day the 2004–05 season was officially cancelled.

=== Trades ===
The Avalanche did not make any trades.

=== Players acquired ===
Date	Player	Former team	Term	Via	Ref
June 10, 2004	Jeff Ulmer	Lukko (Liiga)	1-year	Free agency	
July 2, 2004	Antti Laaksonen	Minnesota Wild	multi-year	Free agency	
July 2, 2004	Ian Laperriere	Los Angeles Kings	multi-year	Free agency	
July 21, 2004	Brett McLean	Chicago Blackhawks	1-year	Free agency	
July 21, 2004	Andre Savage	Philadelphia Flyers	1-year	Free agency	
July 26, 2004	Mathieu Darche	Nashville Predators		Free agency	
August 18, 2004	Vincent Damphousse	San Jose Sharks	1-year	Free agency	

=== Players lost ===
Date	Player	New team	Via (Note: In parentheses is the player’s free agency group on July 1 if applicable.)	Ref
July 1, 2004	Jim Cummins (Note: Cummins was inactive during the 2004–05 season. He retired after being released from Carolina Hurricanes training camp in September 2005.)		Contract expiration (III)	
July 1, 2004	Paul Kariya (Note: Kariya was inactive during the 2004–05 season.)		Contract expiration (V)	
July 1, 2004	Steve Moore (Note: Moore was unable to resume his playing career as a result of the injuries he suffered during a game on March 8, 2004.)		Contract expiration (VI)	
July 1, 2004	Teemu Selanne (Note: Selanne was inactive during the 2004–05 season.)		Contract expiration (III)	
July 2, 2004	Matthew Barnaby	Chicago Blackhawks	Free agency (III)	
September 2004	Mikhail Kuleshov	SKA Saint Petersburg (RSL)	Free agency (UFA)	
September 15, 2004	Riku Hahl	HPK (Liiga)	Free agency (II) (Note: The Avalanche retained Hahl’s NHL rights through the 2007–08 season.)	
October 21, 2004	Travis Brigley	Valerenga (GET)	Free agency (VI)	

=== Signings ===
Date	Player	Term	Contract type	Ref
June 10, 2004	Chris Bala	1-year	Re-signing	
June 10, 2004	Brett Clark	1-year	Re-signing	
June 10, 2004	Darby Hendrickson	1-year	Re-signing	
June 17, 2004	Steve Konowalchuk	3-year	Re-signing	
July 1, 2004	Bob Boughner	multi-year	Re-signing	
July 1, 2004	Chris Gratton	multi-year	Re-signing	
July 1, 2004	Karlis Skrastins	1-year	Re-signing	
July 1, 2004	Peter Worrell	1-year	Re-signing	
July 16, 2004	David Aebischer	1-year	Re-signing	
July 21, 2004	Dan Hinote	1-year	Re-signing	
July 23, 2004	Alex Tanguay	1-year	Re-signing	
July 26, 2004	D. J. Smith		Re-signing	
August 5, 2004	Milan Hejduk	1-year	Arbitration award	

== Draft picks ==
Colorado's picks at the 2004 NHL entry draft, which was held at the RBC Center in Raleigh, North Carolina on June 26–27, 2004.

Round	Pick	Player	Position	Nationality	Team (league)
1	21	Wojtek Wolski	Left wing	Canada	Brampton Battalion (OHL)
2	55	Victor Oreskovich	Right wing	Canada	Green Bay Gamblers (USHL)
3	72	Denis Parshin	Left wing	Russia	CSKA Jr. (Russia)
5	154	Richard Demen-Willaume	Defense	Sweden	Frolunda Jrs. (Sweden)
6	184	Derek Peltier	Defense	United States	Cedar Rapids RoughRiders (USHL)
7	215	Ian Keserich	Goaltender	United States	Cleveland Jr. Barons (NAHL)
8	239	Brandon Yip	Right wing	Canada	Coquitlam Express (BCHL)
8	249	J. D. Corbin	Left wing	United States	Denver Pioneers (WCHA)
9	281	Steve McClellan	Defense	United States	Catholic Memorial School (Mass.)
