= 2004–05 Chicago Blackhawks season =

Chicago Blackhawks season

2004–05 Chicago Blackhawks
- Division: Central
- Conference: Western
- 2004–05 record: Did not play

Team information
- General manager: Bob Pulford
- Coach: Brian Sutter
- Captain: Vacant
- Arena: United Center
- Minor league affiliates: Norfolk Admirals; Greenville Grrrowl

The 2004–05 Chicago Blackhawks season was the 79th National Hockey League season, its games were cancelled as the 2004–05 NHL lockout could not be resolved in time.

== Schedule ==
The Blackhawks preseason and regular season schedules were announced on July 14, 2004.

2004–05 schedule
Preseason

Game	Date	Opponent
1	September 24	Calgary Flames
2	September 26	Columbus Blue Jackets
3	September 29	@ Columbus Blue Jackets
4	September 30	@ Calgary Flames
5	October 2	@ St. Louis Blues
6	October 4	@ Minnesota Wild
7	October 8	St. Louis Blues
8	October 10	Minnesota Wild

Regular season

Game	Date	Opponent
1	October 13	Minnesota Wild
2	October 15	@ St. Louis Blues
3	October 16	Columbus Blue Jackets
4	October 20	Colorado Avalanche
5	October 22	@ Detroit Red Wings
6	October 24	Dallas Stars
7	October 25	@ Philadelphia Flyers
8	October 28	Anaheim Mighty Ducks
9	October 31	@ Carolina Hurricanes
10	November 3	@ Dallas Stars
11	November 4	@ Phoenix Coyotes
12	November 7	Phoenix Coyotes
13	November 10	Los Angeles Kings
14	November 12	Anaheim Mighty Ducks
15	November 14	Edmonton Oilers
16	November 17	@ Vancouver Canucks
17	November 18	@ Edmonton Oilers
18	November 20	@ Calgary Flames
19	November 24	@ San Jose Sharks
20	November 26	@ Anaheim Mighty Ducks
21	November 27	@ Los Angeles Kings
22	December 2	Nashville Predators
23	December 3	@ Detroit Red Wings
24	December 5	Los Angeles Kings
25	December 9	@ Phoenix Coyotes
26	December 10	@ Colorado Avalanche
27	December 12	New Jersey Devils
28	December 14	@ Detroit Red Wings
29	December 15	San Jose Sharks
30	December 17	Detroit Red Wings
31	December 19	Dallas Stars
32	December 22	Tampa Bay Lightning
33	December 23	@ Columbus Blue Jackets
34	December 26	Colorado Avalanche
35	December 28	@ Nashville Predators
36	December 29	Buffalo Sabres
37	January 2	Philadelphia Flyers
38	January 3	@ Buffalo Sabres
39	January 5	Phoenix Coyotes
40	January 7	@ Pittsburgh Penguins
41	January 9	Detroit Red Wings
42	January 12	@ Columbus Blue Jackets
43	January 14	Toronto Maple Leafs
44	January 16	Calgary Flames
45	January 18	@ Minnesota Wild
46	January 20	Nashville Predators
47	January 22	@ St. Louis Blues
48	January 23	Ottawa Senators
49	January 26	Detroit Red Wings
50	January 28	Columbus Blue Jackets
51	January 30	St. Louis Blues
52	February 1	@ Tampa Bay Lightning
53	February 2	@ Florida Panthers
54	February 5	@ Boston Bruins
55	February 8	@ Nashville Predators
56	February 9	@ Dallas Stars
57	February 16	Atlanta Thrashers
58	February 18	Nashville Predators
59	February 20	Columbus Blue Jackets
60	February 21	@ New York Rangers
61	February 23	Edmonton Oilers
62	February 25	@ Columbus Blue Jackets
63	February 27	San Jose Sharks
64	March 1	@ Washington Capitals
65	March 2	Montreal Canadiens
66	March 4	Calgary Flames
67	March 6	St. Louis Blues
68	March 8	@ Vancouver Canucks
69	March 10	@ Calgary Flames
70	March 12	@ San Jose Sharks
71	March 13	@ Anaheim Mighty Ducks
72	March 15	@ Los Angeles Kings
73	March 17	Vancouver Canucks
74	March 20	New York Islanders
75	March 23	Minnesota Wild
76	March 24	@ Minnesota Wild
77	March 26	@ Nashville Predators
78	March 29	@ Edmonton Oilers
79	March 31	@ Colorado Avalanche
80	April 1	Vancouver Canucks
81	April 6	St. Louis Blues
82	April 9	@ St. Louis Blues

== Transactions ==
The Blackhawks were involved in the following transactions from June 8, 2004, the day after the deciding game of the 2004 Stanley Cup Finals, through February 16, 2005, the day the 2004–05 season was officially cancelled.

=== Trades ===
Date	Details		Ref
June 27, 2004	To Chicago Blackhawks: Future considerations (Note: 7th-round pick in 2005.)	To Atlanta Thrashers: Rights to Adam Berkhoel	

=== Players acquired ===
Date	Player	Former team	Term	Via	Ref
July 2, 2004	Matthew Barnaby	Colorado Avalanche	3-year	Free agency	
July 2, 2004	Curtis Brown	San Jose Sharks	4-year	Free agency	
July 22, 2004	Jassen Cullimore	Tampa Bay Lightning	3-year	Free agency	
July 29, 2004	Rene Bourque	University of Wisconsin (WCHA)	2-year	Free agency	

=== Players lost ===
Date	Player	New team	Via (Note: In parentheses is the player’s free agency group on July 1 if applicable.)	Ref
July 7, 2004	Johnathan Aitken	Vancouver Canucks	Free agency (VI)	
July 12, 2004	Ryan VandenBussche	Pittsburgh Penguins	Free agency (III)	
July 13, 2004	Igor Korolev	Lokomotiv Yaroslavl (RSL)	Free agency (III)	
July 20, 2004	Jason Strudwick	New York Rangers	Free agency (UFA)	
July 22, 2004	Brett McLean	Colorado Avalanche	Free agency (VI)	
July 23, 2004	Burke Henry	Florida Panthers	Free agency (VI)	
August 30, 2004	Steve Passmore	Adler Mannheim (DEL)	Free agency (III)	
October 12, 2004	Yorick Treille	Providence Bruins (AHL)	Free agency (UFA)	
November 3, 2004	Matt Underhill	Mississippi Sea Wolves (ECHL)	Free agency (UFA)	
December 20, 2004	Deron Quint	HC Bolzano (ITA)	Free agency (UFA)	
January 5, 2005	Theoren Fleury	Horse Lake Thunder (NPHL)	Free agency (III)	

=== Signings ===
Date	Player	Term	Contract type	Ref
July 1, 2004	Ajay Baines	1-year	Option exercised	
July 1, 2004	Quintin Laing	1-year	Re-signing	
July 1, 2004	Scott Nichol	1-year	Option exercised	
July 15, 2004	Kyle Calder	2-year	Re-signing	
July 15, 2004	Eric Daze	2-year	Re-signing	
July 27, 2004	Jim Vandermeer	2-year	Re-signing	
July 28, 2004	Jocelyn Thibault	1-year	Re-signing	
July 29, 2004	Jason Morgan	2-year	Re-signing	
July 29, 2004	Steve Poapst	1-year	Re-signing	
July 29, 2004	Stephane Robidas	1-year	Re-signing	
August 2, 2004	Craig Anderson	1-year	Re-signing	
August 2, 2004	Steve McCarthy	2-year	Re-signing	
August 10, 2004	Mark Bell	1-year	Re-signing	
August 16, 2004	Bryan Berard	1-year	Re-signing	
September 15, 2004	Michael Leighton	1-year	Re-signing	

== Draft picks ==
Chicago's picks at the 2004 NHL entry draft, which was held at the RBC Center in Raleigh, North Carolina on June 26–27, 2004.

Round	Pick	Player	Position	Nationality	Team (league)
1	3	Cam Barker	Defense	Canada	Medicine Hat Tigers (WHL)
2	32	Dave Bolland	Center	Canada	London Knights (OHL)
2	41	Bryan Bickell	Left wing	Canada	Ottawa 67's (OHL)
2	45	Ryan Garlock	Center	Canada	Windsor Spitfires (OHL)
2	54	Jakub Sindel	Center	Czech Republic	HC Sparta Praha (Czech Extraliga)
3	68	Adam Berti	Left wing	Canada	Oshawa Generals (OHL)
4	120	Mitch Maunu	Defense	Canada	Windsor Spitfires (OHL)
4	123	Karel Hromas	Left wing	Czech Republic	Sparta Jrs. (Czech)
5	131	Trevor Kell	Right wing	Canada	London Knights (OHL)
5	140	Jake Dowell	Center	United States	Wisconsin Badgers (WCHA)
6	165	Scott McCulloch	Left wing	Canada	Grande Prairie Storm (AJHL)
7	196	Petri Kontiola	Center	Finland	Tappara (SM-liiga)
7	214	Troy Brouwer	Left wing	Canada	Moose Jaw Warriors (WHL)
7	223	Jared Walker	Left wing	Canada	Red Deer Rebels (WHL)
8	229	Eric Hunter	Center	Canada	Prince George Cougars (WHL)
8	256	Matthew Ford	Right wing	United States	Sioux Falls Stampede (USHL)
9	260	Marko Anttila	Right wing	Finland	Lempaala (Finland)
