= 2004–05 Edmonton Oilers season =

NHL team season

2004–05 Edmonton Oilers
- Division: Northwest
- Conference: Western
- 2004–05 record: Did not play

Team information
- General manager: Kevin Lowe
- Coach: Craig MacTavish
- Captain: Jason Smith
- Alternate captains: Ethan Moreau; Ryan Smyth
- Arena: Rexall Place
- Minor league affiliates: Edmonton Road Runners (AHL); Greenville Grrrowl (ECHL)

The 2004–05 Edmonton Oilers season was the Oilers' 26th season in the NHL, however, the 2004–05 NHL lockout, which began a day after the 2004 World Cup of Hockey, cancelled the playing of any games.

== Edmonton Roadrunners ==
With the NHL season wiped out, the Oilers would move their AHL team, the Toronto Roadrunners, to Edmonton, rename the club the Edmonton Roadrunners, and they played out of Rexall Place. The Roadrunners would finish with the 3rd highest attendance figure in the league, averaging 8854 fans per game.

== Schedule ==
The Oilers regular season schedule was announced on July 14, 2004.

2004–05 schedule
Preseason

Game	Date	Opponent
1	September 24	Vancouver Canucks
2	September 28	@ Calgary Flames
3	October 1	Calgary Flames
4	October 3	Calgary Flames
5	October 5	@ Vancouver Canucks
6	October 7	@ Calgary Flames

Regular season

Game	Date	Opponent
1	October 14	Detroit Red Wings
2	October 17	Calgary Flames
3	October 19	@ Minnesota Wild
4	October 21	Minnesota Wild
5	October 23	St. Louis Blues
6	October 26	Columbus Blue Jackets
7	October 29	@ Dallas Stars
8	October 30	@ Minnesota Wild
9	November 2	@ Detroit Red Wings
10	November 4	Nashville Predators
11	November 6	@ Calgary Flames
12	November 9	@ Columbus Blue Jackets
13	November 11	@ Pittsburgh Penguins
14	November 12	@ Buffalo Sabres
15	November 14	@ Chicago Blackhawks
16	November 16	@ Colorado Avalanche
17	November 18	Chicago Blackhawks
18	November 20	Minnesota Wild
19	November 22	Nashville Predators
20	November 24	@ Minnesota Wild
21	November 25	@ Nashville Predators
22	November 27	Colorado Avalanche
23	December 2	Toronto Maple Leafs
24	December 5	Columbus Blue Jackets
25	December 7	@ Calgary Flames
26	December 9	@ San Jose Sharks
27	December 11	@ Los Angeles Kings
28	December 12	@ Anaheim Mighty Ducks
29	December 14	Calgary Flames
30	December 18	@ Vancouver Canucks
31	December 21	@ Calgary Flames
32	December 23	Los Angeles Kings
33	December 26	Vancouver Canucks
34	December 28	Minnesota Wild
35	December 30	Philadelphia Flyers
36	January 1	Montreal Canadiens
37	January 2	San Jose Sharks
38	January 4	@ Colorado Avalanche
39	January 6	@ St. Louis Blues
40	January 8	@ Phoenix Coyotes
41	January 11	San Jose Sharks
42	January 13	Dallas Stars
43	January 15	Ottawa Senators
44	January 17	@ San Jose Sharks
45	January 18	@ Los Angeles Kings
46	January 20	New York Islanders
47	January 22	Vancouver Canucks
48	January 24	Anaheim Mighty Ducks
49	January 27	@ Vancouver Canucks
50	January 28	New Jersey Devils
51	February 1	Colorado Avalanche
52	February 3	Detroit Red Wings
53	February 5	New York Rangers
54	February 7	Calgary Flames
55	February 9	Phoenix Coyotes
56	February 15	@ Columbus Blue Jackets
57	February 17	@ Montreal Canadiens
58	February 19	@ Toronto Maple Leafs
59	February 21	@ Ottawa Senators
60	February 23	@ Chicago Blackhawks
61	February 25	Boston Bruins
62	February 27	Phoenix Coyotes
63	March 1	@ Detroit Red Wings
64	March 3	@ St. Louis Blues
65	March 6	@ Nashville Predators
66	March 7	@ Carolina Hurricanes
67	March 9	@ Florida Panthers
68	March 11	@ Tampa Bay Lightning
69	March 13	@ Atlanta Thrashers
70	March 15	St. Louis Blues
71	March 17	@ Colorado Avalanche
72	March 18	@ Dallas Stars
73	March 21	Colorado Avalanche
74	March 23	@ Anaheim Mighty Ducks
75	March 24	@ Phoenix Coyotes
76	March 26	Washington Capitals
77	March 29	Chicago Blackhawks
78	April 1	Dallas Stars
79	April 3	Anaheim Mighty Ducks
80	April 5	Los Angeles Kings
81	April 7	@ Vancouver Canucks
82	April 9	Vancouver Canucks

== Transactions ==
The Oilers were involved in the following transactions from June 8, 2004, the day after the deciding game of the 2004 Stanley Cup Finals, through February 16, 2005, the day the 2004–05 season was officially cancelled.

=== Trades ===
Date	Details		Ref
June 26, 2004	To Phoenix Coyotes: Jason Chimera; 3rd-round pick in 2004	To Edmonton Oilers: 2nd-round pick in 2004; 4th-round pick in 2004	

=== Players acquired ===
Date	Player	Former team	Term	Via	Ref
July 30, 2004	Toby Petersen	Pittsburgh Penguins	2-year	Free agency	
August 24, 2004	Rick Mrozik	Buffalo Sabres	1-year	Free agency	
September 15, 2004	Todd Harvey	San Jose Sharks	2-year (Note: Club option for a third year.)	Free agency	

=== Players lost ===
Date	Player	New team	Via (Note: In parentheses is the player’s free agency group on July 1 if applicable.)	Ref
June 9, 2004	Mikko Luoma	Malmo Redhawks (SHL)	Free agency (II) (Note: The Oilers retained Luoma’s NHL rights through the 2005–06 season.)	
August 13, 2004	Bobby Allen	New Jersey Devils	Free agency (VI)	
August 26, 2004	Petr Nedved	Phoenix Coyotes	Free agency (III)	
September 29, 2004	Sean McAslan	Edmonton Road Runners (AHL)	Free agency (VI)	
October 5, 2004	Jan Horacek	HC Slovan Bratislava (Slovak)	Free agency (VI)	
N/A	Michael Henrich	EK Zell am See (EBEL)	Free agency (UFA)	
N/A	Chad Hinz	Skelleftea AIK (Allsvenskan)	Free agency (VI)	
January 21, 2005	Scott Ferguson	Skovde IK (Allsvenskan)	Free agency (UFA)	

=== Signings ===
Date	Player	Term	Contract type	Ref
June 11, 2004	Igor Ulanov	1-year	Re-signing	
June 14, 2004	Kyle Brodziak	3-year	Entry-level	
July 7, 2004	Ty Conklin	multi-year	Re-signing	
July 15, 2004	Brad Isbister	2-year	Re-signing	
July 15, 2004	Jason Platt	2-year	Entry-level	
July 15, 2004	Jani Rita	1-year	Re-signing	
July 19, 2004	Brock Radunske	3-year	Entry-level	
July 19, 2004	Kenny Smith	2-year	Entry-level	
August 4, 2004	Eric Brewer	1-year	Re-signing	
August 4, 2004	Alexei Semenov	2-year	Re-signing	
August 16, 2004	Mike Bishai	1-year (Note: Club option for a second year.)	Re-signing	
August 16, 2004	Ed Caron	2-year	Entry-level	
August 16, 2004	Nate DiCasmirro	2-year	Re-signing	
August 24, 2004	Sean McAslan	1-year	Re-signing	
August 24, 2004	Mike Morrison	1-year	Re-signing	
September 2, 2004	Tyler Moss	1-year	Re-signing	
September 3, 2004	Marc-Andre Bergeron	4-year (Note: Club option for a fifth year.)	Re-signing	
September 13, 2004	J. J. Hunter	2-year	Re-signing	
September 15, 2004	Radek Dvorak	2-year	Re-signing	
September 15, 2004	Jason Smith	4-year	Re-signing	
September 15, 2004	Zack Stortini	3-year	Entry-level	

== Draft picks ==
Edmonton's draft picks at the 2004 NHL entry draft, which was held at the RBC Center in Raleigh, North Carolina on June 26–27, 2004.

Round	#	Player	Nationality	College/Junior/Club team (League)
1	14	Devan Dubnyk	Canada	Kamloops Blazers (WHL)
1	25	Rob Schremp	United States	London Knights (OHL)
2	44	Roman Teslyuk	Russia	Kamloops Blazers (WHL)
2	57	Geoff Paukovich	United States	US NTDP U18 (NAHL)
4	112	Liam Reddox	Canada	Peterborough Petes (OHL)
5	146	Bryan Young	Canada	Peterborough Petes (OHL)
6	177	Max Gordichuk	Canada	Kamloops Blazers (WHL)
7	208	Stephane Goulet	Canada	Quebec Remparts (QMJHL)
8	242	Tyler Spurgeon	Canada	Kelowna Rockets (WHL)
9	274	Bjorn Bjurling	Sweden	Djurgårdens IF (SEL)
