= 2004–05 Minnesota Wild season =

National Hockey League team season

2004–05 Minnesota Wild
- Division: Northwest
- Conference: Western
- 2004–05 record: Did not play

Team information
- General manager: Doug Risebrough
- Coach: Jacques Lemaire
- Captain: Vacant
- Arena: Xcel Energy Center
- Minor league affiliates: Houston Aeros; Louisiana IceGators

The 2004–05 Minnesota Wild season was the team's fifth season in the National Hockey League (NHL). Its games were cancelled due to the 2004–05 NHL lockout.

== Schedule ==
The Wild's regular season schedule was announced on July 14, 2004. Their preseason schedule was announced on August 4, 2004.

2004–05 schedule
Preseason

Game	Date	Opponent
1	September 25	@ Buffalo Sabres
2	September 26	@ Pittsburgh Penguins
3	October 1	Pittsburgh Penguins
4	October 3	Buffalo Sabres
5	October 4	Chicago Blackhawks
6	October 8	New York Rangers
7	October 10	@ Chicago Blackhawks

Regular season

Game	Date	Opponent
1	October 13	@ Chicago Blackhawks
2	October 14	@ Nashville Predators
3	October 16	Phoenix Coyotes
4	October 19	Edmonton Oilers
5	October 21	@ Edmonton Oilers
6	October 22	@ Vancouver Canucks
7	October 26	Anaheim Mighty Ducks
8	October 28	Vancouver Canucks
9	October 30	Edmonton Oilers
10	November 1	@ Dallas Stars
11	November 3	New York Islanders
12	November 5	Colorado Avalanche
13	November 7	@ Carolina Hurricanes
14	November 9	Phoenix Coyotes
15	November 11	@ San Jose Sharks
16	November 13	@ Phoenix Coyotes
17	November 17	St. Louis Blues
18	November 20	@ Edmonton Oilers
19	November 21	@ Vancouver Canucks
20	November 24	Edmonton Oilers
21	November 26	@ Detroit Red Wings
22	November 28	Calgary Flames
23	November 30	@ Montreal Canadiens
24	December 1	@ Buffalo Sabres
25	December 4	@ Ottawa Senators
26	December 7	Los Angeles Kings
27	December 9	New Jersey Devils
28	December 11	Dallas Stars
29	December 15	@ Columbus Blue Jackets
30	December 16	San Jose Sharks
31	December 18	Pittsburgh Penguins
32	December 20	Dallas Stars
33	December 23	Tampa Bay Lightning
34	December 27	@ Calgary Flames
35	December 28	@ Edmonton Oilers
36	December 30	@ San Jose Sharks
37	January 2	Columbus Blue Jackets
38	January 5	Philadelphia Flyers
39	January 7	Calgary Flames
40	January 8	@ St. Louis Blues
41	January 10	@ New Jersey Devils
42	January 12	@ Tampa Bay Lightning
43	January 14	@ Atlanta Thrashers
44	January 16	@ Washington Capitals
45	January 18	Chicago Blackhawks
46	January 20	Vancouver Canucks
47	January 22	Nashville Predators
48	January 24	@ Columbus Blue Jackets
49	January 25	San Jose Sharks
50	January 27	Colorado Avalanche
51	January 29	Anaheim Mighty Ducks
52	February 2	@ Dallas Stars
53	February 4	@ Colorado Avalanche
54	February 5	@ Nashville Predators
55	February 7	St. Louis Blues
56	February 10	Atlanta Thrashers
57	February 16	New York Rangers
58	February 18	@ Los Angeles Kings
59	February 20	@ Anaheim Mighty Ducks
60	February 22	@ Colorado Avalanche
61	February 24	@ Calgary Flames
62	February 27	Florida Panthers
63	March 2	@ Anaheim Mighty Ducks
64	March 3	@ Los Angeles Kings
65	March 5	@ Phoenix Coyotes
66	March 8	Los Angeles Kings
67	March 10	Detroit Red Wings
68	March 12	Columbus Blue Jackets
69	March 14	@ Vancouver Canucks
70	March 15	@ Calgary Flames
71	March 17	@ Toronto Maple Leafs
72	March 20	Calgary Flames
73	March 23	@ Chicago Blackhawks
74	March 24	Chicago Blackhawks
75	March 26	Boston Bruins
76	March 29	Nashville Predators
77	March 31	@ St. Louis Blues
78	April 2	Vancouver Canucks
79	April 4	Colorado Avalanche
80	April 6	@ Colorado Avalanche
81	April 8	@ Detroit Red Wings
82	April 10	Detroit Red Wings

== Transactions ==
The Wild were involved in the following transactions from June 8, 2004, the day after the deciding game of the 2004 Stanley Cup Finals, through February 16, 2005, the day the 2004–05 season was officially cancelled.

=== Trades ===
The Wild did not make any trades.

=== Players acquired ===
Date	Player	Former team	Term	Via	Ref
July 6, 2004	Kirby Law	Philadelphia Flyers		Free agency	
July 7, 2004	Raymond Giroux	New Jersey Devils		Free agency	
July 8, 2004	Brian Rolston	Boston Bruins	multi-year	Free agency	

=== Players lost ===
Date	Player	New team	Via (Note: In parentheses is the player’s free agency group on July 1 if applicable.)	Ref
July 1, 2004	Bill Muckalt (Note: Muckalt retired.)		Contract expiration (UFA)	
July 2, 2004	Antti Laaksonen	Colorado Avalanche	Free agency (UFA)	
July 14, 2004	Travis Roche	Atlanta Thrashers	Free agency (VI)	
August 1, 2004	Johan Holmqvist	Brynas IF (SHL) (Note: Holmqvist signed with Brynas IF on July 29.)	Release	
August 5, 2004	Jason Wiemer	Calgary Flames	Free agency (UFA)	
September 7, 2004	Frederic Cloutier	Pensacola Ice Pilots (ECHL)	Free agency (UFA)	
September 10, 2004	Jeff Hoggan	Worcester IceCats (AHL)	Free agency (II)	
November 19, 2004	Michael Schutte	Cincinnati Mighty Ducks (AHL)	Free agency (UFA)	

=== Signings ===
Date	Player	Term	Contract type	Ref
June 30, 2004	Marc Chouinard	1-year	Option exercised	
June 30, 2004	Alexandre Daigle	1-year	Option exercised	
July 19, 2004	Manny Fernandez	1-year	Re-signing	
July 20, 2004	Alex Henry	1-year	Re-signing	
August 6, 2004	Richard Park	1-year	Re-signing	
August 12, 2004	Andrew Brunette	1-year	Re-signing	
August 12, 2004	Willie Mitchell	1-year	Re-signing	
September 14, 2004	Nick Schultz		Re-signing	

== Draft picks ==
Minnesota's picks at the 2004 NHL entry draft, which was held at the RBC Center in Raleigh, North Carolina, on June 26–27, 2004.

Round	Pick	Player	Position	Nationality	Team (league)
1	12	A. J. Thelen	Defense	United States	Michigan State University (CCHA)
2	42	Roman Voloshenko	Left wing	Russia	Krylya Sovetov Moscow Jr. (Russia)
3	78	Peter Olvecky	Left wing	Slovakia	Dukla Trenčín Jr. (Slovakia)
3	79	Clayton Stoner	Defense	Canada	Tri-City Americans (WHL)
4	111	Ryan Jones	Forward	Canada	Chatham Maroons (WOJHL)
4	114	Patrick Bordeleau	Left wing	Canada	Val-d'Or Foreurs (QMJHL)
4	117	Julien Sprunger	Right wing	Switzerland	HC Fribourg-Gottéron (NLA)
5	161	Jean-Claude Sawyer	Defense	Canada	Cape Breton Screaming Eagles (QMJHL)
6	175	Aaron Boogaard	Right wing	Canada	Tri-City Americans (WHL)
7	195	Jean-Michel Rizk	Right wing	Canada	Saginaw Spirit (OHL)
7	206	Anton Khudobin	Goaltender	Russia	Metallurg Magnitogorsk Jr. (Russia)
9	272	Kyle Wilson	Center	Canada	Colgate University (ECAC)
