= 2004–05 Phoenix Coyotes season =

NHL hockey team season

2004–05 Phoenix Coyotes
- Division: Pacific
- Conference: Western
- 2004–05 record: Did not play

Team information
- General manager: Mike Barnett
- Coach: Rick Bowness (Note: Bowness remained the interim head coach throughout the lockout.)
- Captain: Shane Doan
- Arena: Glendale Arena
- Minor league affiliates: Utah Grizzlies; Idaho Steelheads

The 2004–05 Phoenix Coyotes season was the franchise's 33rd season overall, 26th National Hockey League season and their ninth season in Phoenix, however its games were cancelled as the 2004–05 NHL lockout could not be resolved in time.

== Schedule ==
The Coyotes preseason and regular season schedules were announced on July 8 and July 14, 2004, respectively.

2004–05 schedule
Preseason

| Game | Date | Opponent |
|---|---|---|
| 1 | September 23 | @ Los Angeles Kings |
| 2 | September 24 | @ Anaheim Mighty Ducks |
| 3 | September 25 | @ San Jose Sharks |
| 4 | October 1 | Los Angeles Kings |
| 5 | October 5 | Anaheim Mighty Ducks |
| 6 | October 9 | San Jose Sharks |

Regular season

| Game | Date | Opponent |
|---|---|---|
| 1 | October 13 | Dallas Stars |
| 2 | October 14 | @ Dallas Stars |
| 3 | October 16 | @ Minnesota Wild |
| 4 | October 21 | Tampa Bay Lightning |
| 5 | October 23 | @ Los Angeles Kings |
| 6 | October 24 | Buffalo Sabres |
| 7 | October 27 | @ Colorado Avalanche |
| 8 | October 28 | Columbus Blue Jackets |
| 9 | October 30 | Calgary Flames |
| 10 | November 3 | @ San Jose Sharks |
| 11 | November 4 | Chicago Blackhawks |
| 12 | November 6 | @ Detroit Red Wings |
| 13 | November 7 | @ Chicago Blackhawks |
| 14 | November 9 | @ Minnesota Wild |
| 15 | November 11 | Vancouver Canucks |
| 16 | November 13 | Minnesota Wild |
| 17 | November 15 | @ Pittsburgh Penguins |
| 18 | November 16 | @ Washington Capitals |
| 19 | November 18 | @ Columbus Blue Jackets |
| 20 | November 20 | St. Louis Blues |
| 21 | November 22 | San Jose Sharks |
| 22 | November 24 | Anaheim Mighty Ducks |
| 23 | November 26 | Los Angeles Kings |
| 24 | December 2 | Atlanta Thrashers |
| 25 | December 4 | Dallas Stars |
| 26 | December 7 | @ San Jose Sharks |
| 27 | December 9 | Chicago Blackhawks |
| 28 | December 11 | Florida Panthers |
| 29 | December 15 | Colorado Avalanche |
| 30 | December 17 | @ Columbus Blue Jackets |
| 31 | December 18 | @ St. Louis Blues |
| 32 | December 22 | @ San Jose Sharks |
| 33 | December 23 | @ Vancouver Canucks |
| 34 | December 26 | @ Anaheim Mighty Ducks |
| 35 | December 29 | Detroit Red Wings |
| 36 | December 31 | San Jose Sharks |
| 37 | January 2 | @ Colorado Avalanche |
| 38 | January 4 | @ Dallas Stars |
| 39 | January 5 | @ Chicago Blackhawks |
| 40 | January 8 | Edmonton Oilers |
| 41 | January 12 | @ Philadelphia Flyers |
| 42 | January 13 | @ New York Rangers |
| 43 | January 15 | @ New York Islanders |
| 44 | January 17 | St. Louis Blues |
| 45 | January 20 | Los Angeles Kings |
| 46 | January 22 | Detroit Red Wings |
| 47 | January 25 | Nashville Predators |
| 48 | January 27 | Calgary Flames |
| 49 | January 29 | @ St. Louis Blues |
| 50 | January 31 | @ Carolina Hurricanes |
| 51 | February 3 | @ Nashville Predators |
| 52 | February 5 | Carolina Hurricanes |
| 53 | February 8 | @ Calgary Flames |
| 54 | February 9 | @ Edmonton Oilers |
| 55 | February 16 | @ Anaheim Mighty Ducks |
| 56 | February 17 | Boston Bruins |
| 57 | February 19 | Washington Capitals |
| 58 | February 21 | @ Los Angeles Kings |
| 59 | February 23 | Anaheim Mighty Ducks |
| 60 | February 25 | Los Angeles Kings |
| 61 | February 27 | @ Edmonton Oilers |
| 62 | March 1 | @ Vancouver Canucks |
| 63 | March 3 | Vancouver Canucks |
| 64 | March 5 | Minnesota Wild |
| 65 | March 8 | @ Detroit Red Wings |
| 66 | March 10 | @ Nashville Predators |
| 67 | March 12 | New Jersey Devils |
| 68 | March 13 | @ Los Angeles Kings |
| 69 | March 15 | New York Islanders |
| 70 | March 17 | @ Calgary Flames |
| 71 | March 19 | @ Ottawa Senators |
| 72 | March 21 | @ Montreal Canadiens |
| 73 | March 22 | @ Toronto Maple Leafs |
| 74 | March 24 | Edmonton Oilers |
| 75 | March 26 | Colorado Avalanche |
| 76 | March 28 | Columbus Blue Jackets |
| 77 | March 30 | @ Anaheim Mighty Ducks |
| 78 | March 31 | Anaheim Mighty Ducks |
| 79 | April 2 | San Jose Sharks |
| 80 | April 6 | @ Dallas Stars |
| 81 | April 8 | Dallas Stars |
| 82 | April 10 | Nashville Predators |

== Transactions ==
The Coyotes were involved in the following transactions from June 8, 2004, the day after the deciding game of the 2004 Stanley Cup Final, through February 16, 2005, the day the 2004–05 season was officially cancelled.

=== Trades ===
| Date | Details | | Ref |
|---|---|---|---|
| June 26, 2004 | To Phoenix Coyotes: Jason Chimera; 3rd-round pick in 2004 | To Edmonton Oilers: New Jersey’s 2nd-round pick in 2004; Buffalo’s 4th-round pick in 2004 | |
| June 26, 2004 | To Phoenix Coyotes: Dallas’ 2nd-round pick in 2004 | To New York Rangers: Philadelphia’s 2nd-round pick in 2004; Edmonton’s 3rd-round pick in 2004 | |
| July 6, 2004 | To Phoenix Coyotes: 4th-round pick in 2005 | To Columbus Blue Jackets: Radoslav Suchy; 6th-round pick in 2005 | |
| August 26, 2004 | To Phoenix Coyotes: Denis Gauthier; Oleg Saprykin | To Calgary Flames: Daymond Langkow | |

=== Players acquired ===
| Date | Player | Former team | Term | Via | Ref |
|---|---|---|---|---|---|
| June 2004 | Brian Savage | St. Louis Blues | | Waivers | |
| July 5, 2004 | Boyd Devereaux | Detroit Red Wings | 1-year (Note: Club option for a second year.) | Free agency | |
| July 6, 2004 | Sean O'Donnell | Boston Bruins | 3-year | Free agency | |
| July 9, 2004 | Mike Ricci | San Jose Sharks | multi-year | Free agency | |
| July 12, 2004 | Sheldon Keefe | Tampa Bay Lightning | 1-year | Free agency | |
| August 6, 2004 | Brett Hull | Detroit Red Wings | 2-year | Free agency | |
| August 26, 2004 | Petr Nedved | Edmonton Oilers | 3-year | Free agency | |
| September 2, 2004 | Rick Berry | Washington Capitals | 2-year | Free agency | |
| September 2, 2004 | Doug Doull | Boston Bruins | 2-year | Free agency | |
| September 2, 2004 | Jon Sim | Pittsburgh Penguins | 1-year | Free agency | |
| September 2, 2004 | Martin Sonnenberg | Calgary Flames | 2-year | Free agency | |
| September 15, 2004 | Landon Bathe | Milwaukee Admirals (AHL) | 2-year | Free agency | |
| September 15, 2004 | Olivier Latendresse | Val-d'Or Foreurs (QMJHL) | 3-year | Free agency | |

=== Players lost ===
| Date | Player | New team | Via (Note: In parentheses is the player’s free agency group on July 1 if applicable.) | Ref |
|---|---|---|---|---|
| July 1, 2004 | Gary Shuchuk (Note: Shuchuk retired.) | | Contract expiration (UFA) | |
| July 21, 2004 | Bryan Helmer | Detroit Red Wings | Free agency (UFA) | |
| July 27, 2004 | Ivan Novoseltsev | HC Lada Togliatti (RSL) | Free agency (UFA) | |
| September 10, 2004 | Chris Ferraro | Sodertalje SK (SHL) | Free agency (VI) | |
| September 10, 2004 | Peter Ferraro | Sodertalje SK (SHL) | Free agency (UFA) | |
| September 21, 2004 | Chris Dyment | Providence Bruins (AHL) | Free agency (UFA) | |
| September 22, 2004 | Todd Reirden | Houston Aeros (AHL) | Free agency (UFA) | |
| January 1, 2005 | Mike Wilson | Storhamar Dragons (Norway) | Free agency (UFA) | |

=== Signings ===
| Date | Player | Term | Contract type | Ref |
|---|---|---|---|---|
| June 8, 2004 | Keith Ballard | 3-year | Entry-level | |
| June 30, 2004 | Tyson Nash | 3-year | Re-signing | |
| July 1, 2004 | Brent Johnson | 1-year | Re-signing | |
| July 21, 2004 | Brian Boucher | 1-year | Re-signing | |
| July 27, 2004 | Derek Morris | 1-year | Re-signing | |
| August 2, 2004 | Ladislav Nagy | 2-year | Re-signing | |
| August 3, 2004 | Krys Kolanos | 1-year | Re-signing | |
| August 12, 2004 | Mike Comrie | 2-year | Re-signing | |
| August 14, 2004 | Daymond Langkow | 1-year | Re-signing | |
| August 17, 2004 | Mike Johnson | 3-year | Re-signing | |
| August 30, 2004 | Jason Chimera | 2-year | Re-signing | |
| August 30, 2004 | Mike Rupp | 1-year | Re-signing | |
| September 2, 2004 | Zac Bierk | 1-year | Re-signing | |
| September 2, 2004 | Erik Westrum | 1-year | Re-signing | |
| September 7, 2004 | Randall Gelech | 3-year | Entry-level | |
| September 13, 2004 | Jason Jaspers | 1-year | Re-signing | |

== Draft picks ==
Phoenix's picks at the 2004 NHL entry draft, which was held at the RBC Center in Raleigh, North Carolina on June 26–27, 2004.

| Round | Pick | Player | Position | Nationality | Team (league) |
|---|---|---|---|---|---|
| 1 | 5 | Blake Wheeler | Right wing | United States | Breck School (Minn.) |
| 2 | 35 | Logan Stephenson | Defense | Canada | Tri-City Americans (WHL) |
| 2 | 50 | Enver Lisin | Right wing | Russia | Kristall Saratov (Russia) |
| 4 | 103 | Roman Tomanek | Right wing | Slovakia | Povazka Bystrica (Slovakia) |
| 4 | 119 | Kevin Porter | Center | United States | US National Under 18 Team |
| 6 | 168 | Kevin Cormier | Left wing | Canada | Moncton Beavers (MJAHL) |
| 7 | 199 | Chad Kolarik | Right wing | United States | US National Under 18 Team |
| 8 | 240 | Aaron Gagnon | Center | Canada | Seattle Thunderbirds (WHL) |
| 9 | 261 | Will Engasser | Left wing | United States | Blake School (Minn.) |
| 9 | 265 | Daniel Winnik | Center | Canada | New Hampshire Wildcats (Hockey East) |
