= 2004–05 Calgary Flames season =

NHL team season

2004–05 Calgary Flames
- Division: Northwest
- Conference: Western
- 2004–05 record: Did not play

Team information
- General manager: Darryl Sutter
- Coach: Darryl Sutter
- Captain: Jarome Iginla
- Arena: Pengrowth Saddledome
- Minor league affiliates: Lowell Lockmonsters (AHL); Las Vegas Wranglers (ECHL)

The 2004–05 Calgary Flames season was the 25th National Hockey League season in Calgary. All games of this season were cancelled as the 2004–05 NHL lockout could not be resolved in time. As a result, the Flames were unable to raise their Western Conference championship banner until the start of 2005–06 season.

== NHL lockout ==
Flames owner, and NHL Chairman of the Board, Harley Hotchkiss was a key figure in the resolution of the labour dispute. Initially taking a low key role, Hotchkiss was thrust into the spotlight when he was invited by NHLPA president Trevor Linden to last-ditch meeting in January 2005 to save the season. While that meeting was unsuccessful in resolving the dispute, the two would continue to meet until an agreement was finally hammered out on July 13, 2005. Hotchkiss' role in the negotiations was prominently mentioned when he was voted into the Hockey Hall of Fame in 2006.

Defenceman Mike Commodore created a stir early on in the lockout when he stated during a radio interview for The Fan 960 in Calgary that he would accept a salary cap if it meant resolving the lockout.

I'll risk the slap on the wrist. I don't want to spend however long my career lasts playing here in the American Hockey League, so I think whatever it takes. It's got to be give and take on both sides, not one side can be making all the money. But if (a salary cap is) what it takes -- the sport has to go on -- so I'm going to say, yeah.

Commodore was also critical of the leadership of the NHLPA:

I don't think it's being handled well at all. The thing is, you look at the PA and who's in charge ... it's all the guys that have made $30 million playing this game. If there's never another game of hockey ... and they don't make another cent playing in the NHL, they're gonna be all right.

Unlike other players who made similar statements, Commodore never retracted his comments.

During the lockout, the Flames heavily promoted their Western Hockey League team, the Calgary Hitmen. The result was that the Hitmen obliterated the WHL record for attendance by over 40,000 with a season mark of 362,227. The mark would also set a CHL record. The Hitmen's average of 10,062 was the highest average of any junior or professional hockey team in North America.

== Schedule ==
2004–05 schedule
Preseason

Game	Date	Opponent
1	September 24	@ Chicago Blackhawks
2	September 25	Vancouver Canucks
3	September 28	Edmonton Oilers
4	September 30	Chicago Blackhawks
5	October 1	@ Edmonton Oilers
6	October 3	@ Edmonton Oilers
7	October 7	Edmonton Oilers
8	October 8	@ Vancouver Canucks

Regular season

Game	Date	Opponent
1	October 13	@ Anaheim Mighty Ducks
2	October 15	@ Los Angeles Kings
3	October 17	@ Edmonton Oilers
4	October 19	Vancouver Canucks
5	October 21	St. Louis Blues
6	October 23	Columbus Blue Jackets
7	October 26	@ Vancouver Canucks
8	October 29	@ Colorado Avalanche
9	October 30	@ Phoenix Coyotes
10	November 2	Nashville Predators
11	November 4	Colorado Avalanche
12	November 6	Edmonton Oilers
13	November 9	Anaheim Mighty Ducks
14	November 11	@ Tampa Bay Lightning
15	November 12	@ Florida Panthers
16	November 14	@ Carolina Hurricanes
17	November 18	Nashville Predators
18	November 20	Chicago Blackhawks
19	November 23	@ St. Louis Blues
20	November 24	@ Detroit Red Wings
21	November 26	Colorado Avalanche
22	November 28	@ Minnesota Wild
23	November 30	Toronto Maple Leafs
24	December 2	@ Vancouver Canucks
25	December 3	Columbus Blue Jackets
26	December 5	@ Colorado Avalanche
27	December 7	Edmonton Oilers
28	December 9	Vancouver Canucks
29	December 11	Detroit Red Wings
30	December 14	@ Edmonton Oilers
31	December 16	@ Ottawa Senators
32	December 18	@ Toronto Maple Leafs
33	December 21	Edmonton Oilers
34	December 27	Minnesota Wild
35	December 29	Philadelphia Flyers
36	December 31	Montreal Canadiens
37	January 3	San Jose Sharks
38	January 6	@ Nashville Predators
39	January 7	@ Minnesota Wild
40	January 9	@ Columbus Blue Jackets
41	January 11	Dallas Stars
42	January 14	Ottawa Senators
43	January 16	@ Chicago Blackhawks
44	January 17	@ Pittsburgh Penguins
45	January 19	@ Detroit Red Wings
46	January 21	New York Islanders
47	January 23	Anaheim Mighty Ducks
48	January 25	@ Dallas Stars
49	January 27	@ Phoenix Coyotes
50	January 29	New Jersey Devils
51	February 1	San Jose Sharks
52	February 3	New York Rangers
53	February 5	Detroit Red Wings
54	February 7	@ Edmonton Oilers
55	February 8	Phoenix Coyotes
56	February 10	Vancouver Canucks
57	February 16	@ Los Angeles Kings
58	February 17	@ San Jose Sharks
59	February 19	@ Vancouver Canucks
60	February 24	Minnesota Wild
61	February 26	Boston Bruins
62	March 1	@ St. Louis Blues
63	March 2	@ Dallas Stars
64	March 4	@ Chicago Blackhawks
65	March 6	@ Atlanta Thrashers
66	March 8	@ Nashville Predators
67	March 10	Chicago Blackhawks
68	March 12	St. Louis Blues
69	March 15	Minnesota Wild
70	March 17	Phoenix Coyotes
71	March 19	@ Colorado Avalanche
72	March 20	@ Minnesota Wild
73	March 22	Washington Capitals
74	March 24	Los Angeles Kings
75	March 26	@ Montreal Canadiens
76	March 27	@ Buffalo Sabres
77	March 30	@ Columbus Blue Jackets
78	April 2	Dallas Stars
79	April 4	Los Angeles Kings
80	April 6	@ Anaheim Mighty Ducks
81	April 7	@ San Jose Sharks
82	April 10	Colorado Avalanche

== Transactions ==
The Flames were involved in the following transactions from June 8, 2004, the day after the deciding game of the 2004 Stanley Cup Finals, through February 16, 2005, the day the 2004–05 season was officially cancelled.

=== Trades ===
Date	Details		Ref
June 25, 2004	To Calgary Flames: 1st-round pick in 2004; 2nd-round pick in 2004	To New York Rangers: 1st-round pick in 2004; 8th-round pick in 2004	
June 26, 2004	To Calgary Flames: 3rd-round pick in 2004; 3rd-round pick in 2004	To Columbus Blue Jackets: 2nd-round pick in 2004	
August 26, 2004	To Calgary Flames: Daymond Langkow	To Phoenix Coyotes: Denis Gauthier; Oleg Saprykin	

=== Players acquired ===
Date	Player	Former team	Term	Via	Ref
July 2, 2004	Byron Ritchie	Florida Panthers	3-year	Free agency	
July 6, 2004	Carsen Germyn	Norfolk Admirals (AHL)		Free agency	
July 6, 2004	Mark Giordano	Owen Sound Attack (OHL)		Free agency	
July 6, 2004	Davin Heintz	Swift Current Broncos (WHL)		Free agency	
July 6, 2004	Dustin Johner	South Carolina Stingrays (ECHL)		Free agency	
July 6, 2004	Patrik Nilson	Laredo Bucks (CHL)		Free agency	
July 6, 2004	Richie Regehr	Portland Winter Hawks (WHL)		Free agency	
July 6, 2004	Justin Taylor	Red Deer Rebels (WHL)		Free agency	
August 5, 2004	Jason Wiemer	Minnesota Wild	3-year	Free agency	
September 7, 2004	Sebastien Centomo	Toronto Maple Leafs		Free agency	
September 15, 2004	Anders Eriksson	Columbus Blue Jackets		Free agency	

=== Players lost ===
Date	Player	New team	Via (Note: In parentheses is the player’s free agency group on July 1 if applicable.)	Ref
July 1, 2004	Dave Lowry (Note: Lowry was inactive during the 2004–05 season and announced his retirement on August 10, 2005.)		Contract expiration (III)	
July 1, 2004	Jesse Wallin (Note: Wallin retired.)		Contract expiration (VI)	
July 1, 2004	Brad Werenka (Note: Werenka, who last played during the 2000–01 season, retired.)		Contract expiration (III)	
July 6, 2004	Craig Conroy	Los Angeles Kings	Free agency (III)	
July 15, 2004	Krzysztof Oliwa	New Jersey Devils	Free agency (III)	
September 2, 2004	Petr Buzek	HC Dukla Jihlava (ELH)	Free agency (UFA)	
September 2, 2004	Martin Sonnenberg	Phoenix Coyotes	Free agency (VI)	
September 25, 2004	Dany Sabourin	Wilkes-Barre/Scranton Penguins (AHL)	Free agency (UFA)	
October 5, 2004	Dean McAmmond	Albany River Rats (AHL)	Free agency (III)	

=== Signings ===
Date	Player	Term	Contract type	Ref
July 1, 2004	Ville Nieminen	1-year	Option exercised	
July 2, 2004	Chris Simon	1-year	Re-signing	
July 20, 2004	Marcus Nilson	3-year	Re-signing	
July 26, 2004	Mike Commodore	2-year	Re-signing	
August 3, 2004	Denis Gauthier	2-year	Re-signing	
August 18, 2004	Jordan Leopold	1-year	Re-signing	
August 23, 2004	Miikka Kiprusoff	1-year	Arbitration award	
September 15, 2004	Lynn Loyns		Re-signing	
September 15, 2004	Dion Phaneuf		Entry-level	

== Draft picks ==
Calgary's picks at the 2004 NHL entry draft held at Raleigh, North Carolina. The Flames had the 24th overall pick in the draft, the first time they picked outside of the top 20 since 1995.

Rnd	Pick	Player	Nationality	Position	Team (league)	NHL statistics				
Rnd	Pick	Player	Nationality	Position	Team (league)	GP	G	A	Pts	PIM
1	24	Kris Chucko	Canada	LW	Salmon Arm Silverbacks (BCHL)	2	0	0	0	2
3	70	Brandon Prust	Canada	C	London Knights (OHL)	486	40	75	115	1036
3	98	Dustin Boyd	Canada	C	Moose Jaw Warriors (WHL)	220	32	31	63	41
4	118	Aki Seitsonen	Finland	C	Prince Albert Raiders (WHL)					
4	121	Kris Hogg	Canada	LW	Kamloops Blazers (WHL)					
6	173	Adam Pardy	Canada	D	Cape Breton Screaming Eagles (QMJHL)	342	4	48	52	269
6	182	Fred Wikner	Sweden	F	Frolunda Jr.					
7	200	Matthew Schneider	Canada	C	Tri-City Americans (WHL)					
7	213	James Spratt	United States	G	Sioux City Musketeers (USHL)					
9	279	Adam Cracknell	Canada	RW	Kootenay Ice (WHL)	210	21	22	43	46

== Farm teams ==
=== Lowell Lockmonsters ===
The Flames American Hockey League affiliate for the second year was the Lowell Lockmonsters, whom they shared with the Carolina Hurricanes. The Lockmonsters finished with a franchise best record of 47–27–5–1, good for third in the Atlantic Division. The Lockmonsters would be bounced from the playoffs in the second round, however.

Chuck Kobasew led Lowell with a franchise record 38 goals, while Brent Krahn recorded six shutouts in only 35 games as he played backup to Carolina's top goaltending prospect, Cam Ward.

=== Las Vegas Wranglers ===
The Las Vegas Wranglers were the Flames ECHL affiliate for the second year in 2004–05. The second year club finished with a 31–33–8 record, missing the playoffs after finishing 7th in the West Division.
