= 2004–05 Nashville Predators season =

Professional ice hockey team season

2004–05 Nashville Predators
- Division: Central
- Conference: Western
- 2004–05 record: Did not play

Team information
- General manager: David Poile
- Coach: Barry Trotz
- Captain: Greg Johnson
- Arena: Gaylord Entertainment Center
- Minor league affiliate: Milwaukee Admirals

The 2004–05 Nashville Predators season would have been their 7th National Hockey League season; however, it was cancelled as the 2004–05 NHL lockout could not be resolved in time to save the season.

== Schedule ==
The Predators preseason and regular season schedule were announced on July 14, 2004.

2004–05 schedule
Preseason

Game	Date	Opponent
1	September 24	@ St. Louis Blues
2	September 25	St. Louis Blues
3	September 26	@ Florida Panthers
4	October 1	Columbus Blue Jackets
5	October 2	@ Columbus Blue Jackets
6	October 8	Atlanta Thrashers
7	October 9	@ Atlanta Thrashers

Regular season

Game	Date	Opponent
1	October 14	Minnesota Wild
2	October 16	St. Louis Blues
3	October 20	@ Dallas Stars
4	October 21	San Jose Sharks
5	October 23	Anaheim Mighty Ducks
6	October 27	@ Tampa Bay Lightning
7	October 29	@ Florida Panthers
8	October 30	Detroit Red Wings
9	November 2	@ Calgary Flames
10	November 4	@ Edmonton Oilers
11	November 5	@ Vancouver Canucks
12	November 8	@ New York Rangers
13	November 10	@ New Jersey Devils
14	November 11	@ New York Islanders
15	November 13	Colorado Avalanche
16	November 16	Los Angeles Kings
17	November 18	@ Calgary Flames
18	November 19	@ Vancouver Canucks
19	November 22	@ Edmonton Oilers
20	November 25	Edmonton Oilers
21	November 27	San Jose Sharks
22	November 30	Vancouver Canucks
23	December 2	@ Chicago Blackhawks
24	December 4	Atlanta Thrashers
25	December 7	Philadelphia Flyers
26	December 8	@ St. Louis Blues
27	December 11	Colorado Avalanche
28	December 15	@ Anaheim Mighty Ducks
29	December 16	@ Los Angeles Kings
30	December 18	@ San Jose Sharks
31	December 21	Ottawa Senators
32	December 23	Anaheim Mighty Ducks
33	December 26	Dallas Stars
34	December 28	Chicago Blackhawks
35	December 30	Toronto Maple Leafs
36	January 1	Los Angeles Kings
37	January 3	@ Washington Capitals
38	January 5	@ Detroit Red Wings
39	January 6	Calgary Flames
40	January 8	Carolina Hurricanes
41	January 10	St. Louis Blues
42	January 12	@ Atlanta Thrashers
43	January 13	@ Detroit Red Wings
44	January 15	Columbus Blue Jackets
45	January 17	Montreal Canadiens
46	January 19	@ Dallas Stars
47	January 20	@ Chicago Blackhawks
48	January 22	@ Minnesota Wild
49	January 25	@ Phoenix Coyotes
50	January 26	@ Anaheim Mighty Ducks
51	January 29	@ Los Angeles Kings
52	January 30	@ San Jose Sharks
53	February 3	Phoenix Coyotes
54	February 5	Minnesota Wild
55	February 8	Chicago Blackhawks
56	February 10	@ Columbus Blue Jackets
57	February 15	@ St. Louis Blues
58	February 18	@ Chicago Blackhawks
59	February 20	New Jersey Devils
60	February 23	@ Columbus Blue Jackets
61	February 25	Vancouver Canucks
62	February 27	Detroit Red Wings
63	March 2	@ Colorado Avalanche
64	March 4	@ Columbus Blue Jackets
65	March 6	Edmonton Oilers
66	March 8	Calgary Flames
67	March 10	Phoenix Coyotes
68	March 12	Dallas Stars
69	March 14	Columbus Blue Jackets
70	March 16	@ Detroit Red Wings
71	March 17	@ Boston Bruins
72	March 19	@ Buffalo Sabres
73	March 22	Pittsburgh Penguins
74	March 24	Florida Panthers
75	March 26	Chicago Blackhawks
76	March 29	@ Minnesota Wild
77	March 31	Detroit Red Wings
78	April 2	St. Louis Blues
79	April 3	@ St. Louis Blues
80	April 5	Columbus Blue Jackets
81	April 8	@ Colorado Avalanche
82	April 10	@ Phoenix Coyotes

== Transactions ==
The Predators were involved in the following transactions from June 8, 2004, the day after the deciding game of the 2004 Stanley Cup Finals, through February 16, 2005, the day the 2004–05 season was officially cancelled.

=== Trades ===
The Predators did not make any trades.

=== Players acquired ===
Date	Player	Former team	Term	Via	Ref
July 9, 2004	Greg Zanon	Milwaukee Admirals (AHL)		Free agency	
July 22, 2004	Cam Severson	Anaheim Mighty Ducks		Free agency	
July 22, 2004	Jerred Smithson	Los Angeles Kings		Free agency	
July 26, 2004	Andreas Lilja	Florida Panthers	1-year	Free agency	

=== Players lost ===
Date	Player	New team	Via (Note: In parentheses is the player’s free agency group on July 1 if applicable.)	Ref
June 13, 2004	Kirill Safronov	Lokomotiv Yaroslavl (RSL)	Free agency (II) (Note: The Predators retained Safronov’s NHL rights through the 2007–08 season.)	
July 1, 2004	Brad Bombardir (Note: Bombardir was inactive during the 2004–05 season.)		Contract expiration (III)	
July 1, 2004	Mike Farrell (Note: Farrell retired.)		Contract expiration (VI)	
July 1, 2004	Rem Murray (Note: Murray retired due to the neurological disorder Dystonia. He was able to resume his career during the 2005–06 season.)		Contract expiration (III)	
July 1, 2004	Jason York (Note: Though he was reported to have signed with three different European teams between February 14–17, 2005, York was ultimately inactive during the 2004–05 season.)		Contract expiration (III)	
July 7, 2004	Wade Flaherty	Vancouver Canucks	Free agency (III)	
July 25, 2004	Greg Classen	Porin Assat (Liiga)	Free agency (UFA)	
July 26, 2004	Mathieu Darche	Colorado Avalanche	Free agency (VI)	
August 13, 2004	Ray Schultz	New Jersey Devils	Free agency (VI)	
August 19, 2004	Andreas Johansson	Geneve-Servette HC (NLA)	Free agency (III)	
October 19, 2004	Sergei Zholtok	HK Riga 2000 (BHL)	Free agency (III)	

=== Signings ===
Date	Player	Term	Contract type	Ref
June 29, 2004	David Legwand	1-year	Option exercised	
July 9, 2004	Darren Haydar		Re-signing	
July 9, 2004	Tony Hrkac		Re-signing	
July 15, 2004	Mark Eaton		Re-signing	
July 15, 2004	Shane Hnidy		Re-signing	
July 22, 2004	Jamie Allison		Re-signing	
July 22, 2004	Wyatt Smith	1-year	Re-signing	
July 22, 2004	Jeremy Stevenson		Re-signing	
July 26, 2004	Brian Finley		Re-signing	
July 26, 2004	Scott Hartnell		Re-signing	
July 26, 2004	Andrew Hutchinson		Re-signing	
August 3, 2004	Steve Sullivan	1-year	Re-signing	
August 4, 2004	Tomas Vokoun	3-year	Re-signing	
August 9, 2004	Vladimir Orszagh	1-year	Re-signing	
September 9, 2004	Vernon Fiddler		Re-signing	
September 9, 2004	Ryan Suter	3-year	Entry-level	
September 14, 2004	Kevin Klein		Entry-level	
September 14, 2004	Shea Weber		Entry-level	
September 15, 2004	Paul Brown		Entry-level	
September 15, 2004	Simon Gamache		Re-signing	
September 15, 2004	Marek Zidlicky		Re-signing	

== Draft picks ==
Nashville's picks at the 2004 NHL entry draft, which was held at the RBC Center in Raleigh, North Carolina on June 26–27, 2004.

Round	Pick	Player	Position	Nationality	Team (league)
1	15	Alexander Radulov	Forward	Russia	THK Tver (Russia)
3	81	Vaclav Meidl	Center	Czech Republic	Plymouth Whalers (OHL)
4	107	Nick Fugere	Left wing	Canada	Gatineau Olympiques (QMJHL)
5	139	Kyle Moir	Goaltender	Canada	Swift Current Broncos (WHL)
5	147	Janne Niskala	Defense	Finland	Lukko (SM-liiga)
6	178	Mike Santorelli	Center	Canada	Vernon Vipers (BCHL)
6	193	Kevin Schaeffer	Defense	United States	Boston University Terriers (Hockey East)
7	209	Stanislav Balan	Forward	Czech Republic	Zlin Jr. (Czech)
8	243	Denis Kulyash	Defense	Russia	HC CSKA Moscow Jr. (Russia)
8	258	Pekka Rinne	Goaltender	Finland	Karpat (SM-liiga)
9	275	Craig Switzer	Defense	Canada	Salmon Arm Silverbacks (BCHL)
