= 2004–05 Vancouver Canucks season =

NHL hockey team season

2004–05 Vancouver Canucks
- Division: Northwest
- Conference: Western
- 2004–05 record: Did not play

Team information
- General manager: Dave Nonis
- Coach: Marc Crawford
- Captain: Markus Naslund
- Arena: General Motors Place
- Minor league affiliates: Manitoba Moose; Columbia Inferno

The 2004–05 Vancouver Canucks season was the team's 35th season in the NHL. However, the entire season's games were cancelled as a result of the 2004–05 NHL lockout.

== Schedule ==
The Canucks regular season schedule was announced on July 14, 2004. Their preseason schedule was released on August 10, 2004.

2004–05 schedule
Preseason

Game	Date	Opponent
1	September 24	@ Edmonton Oilers
2	September 25	@ Calgary Flames
3	September 26	Anaheim Mighty Ducks
4	September 30	@ San Jose Sharks
5	October 3	@ Anaheim Mighty Ducks
6	October 5	Edmonton Oilers
7	October 7	San Jose Sharks
8	October 8	Calgary Flames

Regular season

Game	Date	Opponent
1	October 13	@ San Jose Sharks
2	October 16	Detroit Red Wings
3	October 19	@ Calgary Flames
4	October 20	St. Louis Blues
5	October 22	Minnesota Wild
6	October 24	Columbus Blue Jackets
7	October 26	Calgary Flames
8	October 28	@ Minnesota Wild
9	October 30	@ Colorado Avalanche
10	November 2	Colorado Avalanche
11	November 5	Nashville Predators
12	November 7	Anaheim Mighty Ducks
13	November 10	@ Colorado Avalanche
14	November 11	@ Phoenix Coyotes
15	November 13	@ San Jose Sharks
16	November 17	Chicago Blackhawks
17	November 19	Nashville Predators
18	November 21	Minnesota Wild
19	November 23	@ Atlanta Thrashers
20	November 24	@ Tampa Bay Lightning
21	November 26	@ Florida Panthers
22	November 28	@ Carolina Hurricanes
23	November 30	@ Nashville Predators
24	December 2	Calgary Flames
25	December 4	Toronto Maple Leafs
26	December 6	Columbus Blue Jackets
27	December 9	@ Calgary Flames
28	December 10	Detroit Red Wings
29	December 12	@ Columbus Blue Jackets
30	December 14	@ Pittsburgh Penguins
31	December 16	@ Detroit Red Wings
32	December 18	Edmonton Oilers
33	December 21	Los Angeles Kings
34	December 23	Phoenix Coyotes
35	December 26	@ Edmonton Oilers
36	December 27	Philadelphia Flyers
37	December 29	Montreal Canadiens
38	December 31	@ Detroit Red Wings
39	January 1	@ Buffalo Sabres
40	January 4	@ St. Louis Blues
41	January 6	@ Colorado Avalanche
42	January 8	Dallas Stars
43	January 10	San Jose Sharks
44	January 12	Ottawa Senators
45	January 14	@ Anaheim Mighty Ducks
46	January 15	@ Los Angeles Kings
47	January 20	@ Minnesota Wild
48	January 22	@ Edmonton Oilers
49	January 23	New York Islanders
50	January 25	New Jersey Devils
51	January 27	Edmonton Oilers
52	January 31	Colorado Avalanche
53	February 2	New York Rangers
54	February 5	@ Toronto Maple Leafs
55	February 7	@ Ottawa Senators
56	February 8	@ Montreal Canadiens
57	February 10	@ Calgary Flames
58	February 15	San Jose Sharks
59	February 19	Calgary Flames
60	February 22	Boston Bruins
61	February 24	@ St. Louis Blues
62	February 25	@ Nashville Predators
63	February 27	@ Dallas Stars
64	March 1	Phoenix Coyotes
65	March 3	@ Phoenix Coyotes
66	March 5	@ Los Angeles Kings
67	March 6	@ Anaheim Mighty Ducks
68	March 8	Chicago Blackhawks
69	March 10	St. Louis Blues
70	March 14	Minnesota Wild
71	March 17	@ Chicago Blackhawks
72	March 18	@ Columbus Blue Jackets
73	March 20	@ Dallas Stars
74	March 22	Colorado Avalanche
75	March 24	Washington Capitals
76	March 26	Los Angeles Kings
77	March 30	Dallas Stars
78	April 1	@ Chicago Blackhawks
79	April 2	@ Minnesota Wild
80	April 4	Anaheim Mighty Ducks
81	April 7	Edmonton Oilers
82	April 9	@ Edmonton Oilers

== Transactions ==
The Canucks were involved in the following transactions from June 8, 2004, the day after the deciding game of the 2004 Stanley Cup Finals, through February 16, 2005, the day the 2004–05 season was officially cancelled.

=== Trades ===
Date	Details		Ref
June 26, 2004	To Vancouver Canucks: 3rd-round pick in 2004	To Dallas Stars: 3rd-round pick in 2005	

=== Players acquired ===
Date	Player	Former team	Term	Via	Ref
July 7, 2004	Johnathan Aitken	Chicago Blackhawks		Free agency	
July 7, 2004	Wade Flaherty	Nashville Predators		Free agency	
July 7, 2004	Lee Goren	Florida Panthers		Free agency	
August 19, 2004	Joe DiPenta	Atlanta Thrashers		Free agency	
August 19, 2004	Jeff Heerema	New York Rangers		Free agency	

=== Players lost ===
Date	Player	New team	Via (Note: In parentheses is the player’s free agency group on July 1 if applicable.)	Ref
June 13, 2004	Sergei Varlamov	Ak Bars Kazan (RSL)	Free agency (VI)	
June 19, 2004	Artem Chubarov	HC Dynamo Moscow (RSL)	Free agency (II) (Note: The Canucks retained Chubarov’s NHL rights through the 2007–08 season.)	
June 28, 2004	Geoff Sanderson	Columbus Blue Jackets	Waivers	
July 1, 2004	Marc Bergevin (Note: Bergevin retired.)		Contract expiration (III)	
July 1, 2004	Mike Keane (Note: Keane was inactive during the 2004–05 season.)		Contract expiration (III)	
July 7, 2004	Brandon Reid	Hamburg Freezers (DEL)	Free agency (II) (Note: Vancouver retained Reid’s NHL rights and re-signed him on June 19, 2006.)	
July 27, 2004	Pat Kavanagh	Ottawa Senators	Free agency (VI)	
August 1, 2004	Johan Hedberg	Leksands IF (Allsvenskan)	Free agency (UFA)	
August 6, 2004	Magnus Arvedson	Farjestad BK (SHL)	Free agency (III)	
August 20, 2004	Martin Rucinsky	HC Litvinov (ELH)	Free agency (III)	
September 17, 2004	Sylvain Blouin	Quebec RadioX (LNAH)	Free agency (UFA)	
October 21, 2004	Chris Nielsen	San Antonio Rampage (AHL)	Free agency (UFA)	
January 20, 2005	Mats Lindgren		Retirement (UFA)	

=== Signings ===
Date	Player	Term	Contract type	Ref
June 30, 2004	Matt Cooke		Re-signing	
June 30, 2004	Brent Sopel		Re-signing	
July 27, 2004	Dan Cloutier	1-year	Re-signing	
July 27, 2004	Brendan Morrison	1-year	Re-signing	
August 19, 2004	Nolan Baumgartner		Re-signing	
September 10, 2004	Alex Auld	multi-year	Re-signing	
September 10, 2004	Daniel Sedin	1-year	Re-signing	
September 10, 2004	Henrik Sedin	1-year	Re-signing	

== Draft picks ==
Vancouver's picks at the 2004 NHL entry draft, which was held at the RBC Center in Raleigh, North Carolina on June 26–27, 2004.

Round	#	Player	Nationality	College/Junior/Club team (League)
1	26	Cory Schneider (G)	United States	Phillips Academy (US High School)
3	91	Alexander Edler (D)	Sweden	Jamtland (Sweden)
4	125	Andrew Sarauer (LW)	Canada	Langley Hornets (BCHL)
5	159	Mike Brown (RW)	United States	University of Michigan (CCHA)
6	189	Julien Ellis (G)	Canada	Shawinigan Cataractes (QMJHL)
8	254	David Schulz (D)	Canada	Swift Current Broncos (WHL)
9	287	Jannik Hansen (RW)	Denmark	Malmö Jr. (SJL)
