= Nils Bäckström =

Swedish ice hockey player (born 1986)

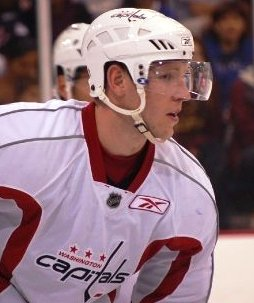
- Bäckström at the Washington Capitals development camp in 2009.
- Born: 29 June 1986 (age 40) Stockholm, Sweden
- Height: 6 ft 1 in (185 cm)
- Weight: 201 lb (91 kg; 14 st 5 lb)
- Position: Defence
- Shot: Left
- Played for: Djurgårdens IF; Ilves; Timrå IK; AIK IF
- NHL draft: 290th overall, 2004; Detroit Red Wings
- Playing career: 2004–2015

Nils Bäckström (born 29 June 1986) is a Swedish ice hockey player who has played professionally in USA, Finland, Sweden and Russia. He currently plays for AIK IF in the Swedish second division, HockeyAllsvenskan.

== Playing career ==
Bäckström began his junior hockey career in his native Sweden with Stocksund and later Djurgårdens IF Hockey. He was drafted by the Detroit Red Wings in the 2004 NHL entry draft.

In 2006, he moved to North America, where he attended the University of Alaska Anchorage, playing four seasons of NCAA Division I college hockey with the Alaska Anchorage Seawolves.

During the summer period of 2009 he attended the Washington Capitals development camp. From 2010 to 2012 he played for Ilves in the SM-liiga, Finland. He started the 2012–2013 season with Timrå IK. In January 2013 he signed for AIK IF.

AIK chose not to extend the contract with Bäckström for unknown reasons for the following season, opting him for a new challenge.

He spent the 2013–2014 season in the Russian second division with Rubin Tyumen reaching the final in the playoffs. Stacking up an impressive plus/minus rating during his season earning him with the award for best defenseman in the league. During the 2014–2015 season he rejoined AIK IF.

== Career statistics ==
			Regular season					Playoffs
Season	Team	League	GP	G	A	Pts	PIM	GP	G	A	Pts	PIM
2002–03	Hammarby IF	J18 Allsv	10	0	2	2	22	—	—	—	—	—
2002–03	Hammarby IF	J20	1	0	0	0	0	—	—	—	—	—
2003–04	Stocksunds IF	J18 Allsv	12	1	6	7	26	—	—	—	—	—
2004–05	Djurgårdens IF	J20	31	0	5	5	75	—	—	—	—	—
2005–06	Djurgårdens IF	J20	41	7	11	18	70	4	0	1	1	4
2005–06	Djurgårdens IF	SEL	1	0	0	0	0	—	—	—	—	—
2006–07	University of Alaska Anchorage	WCHA	33	1	9	10	44	—	—	—	—	—
2007–08	University of Alaska Anchorage	WCHA	16	1	2	3	18	—	—	—	—	—
2008–09	University of Alaska Anchorage	WCHA	34	4	4	8	38	—	—	—	—	—
2009–10	University of Alaska Anchorage	WCHA	27	0	3	3	30	—	—	—	—	—
2009–10	Alaska Aces	ECHL	4	0	1	1	0	1	0	0	0	0
2010–11	Ilves	SM-liiga	48	4	2	6	52	6	0	0	0	14
2011–12	Ilves	SM-liiga	57	2	7	9	79	—	—	—	—	—
2012–13	Timrå IK	SEL	43	0	4	4	30	—	—	—	—	—
2012–13	AIK	SEL	10	0	1	1	8	—	—	—	—	—
2013–14	Rubin Tyumen	VHL	42	6	10	16	75	22	4	6	10	16
2014–15	Rubin Tyumen	VHL	15	0	3	3	18	—	—	—	—	—
2014–15	AIK	Allsv	15	0	1	1	12	7	0	1	1	6
SEL totals			54	0	5	5	38	—	—	—	—	—
SM-liiga totals			105	6	9	15	131	6	0	0	0	14
