= 2004–05 Ottawa Senators season =

NHL hockey team season

2004–05 Ottawa Senators
- Division: Northeast
- Conference: Eastern
- 2004–05 record: Did not play

Team information
- General manager: John Muckler
- Coach: Bryan Murray
- Captain: Daniel Alfredsson
- Alternate captains: Zdeno Chara; Wade Redden
- Arena: Corel Centre
- Minor league affiliate: Binghamton Senators

The 2004–05 Ottawa Senators season was the 13th season of the Ottawa Senators of the National Hockey League (NHL). All games were cancelled due to the 2004–05 NHL lockout, which cancelled play for the entire League. Several of the Senators' players played for teams in European hockey leagues while some played for the Senators' American Hockey League (AHL) affiliate, the Binghamton Senators.

== Off-season ==
On June 8, 2004, Bryan Murray of nearby town Shawville, Quebec, became the team's fifth head coach, leaving the Mighty Ducks of Anaheim where he had previously been general manager.

Like all other NHL teams, the Senators were still eligible to take part in the 2004 NHL entry draft and selected Andrej Meszaros in the first round, 23rd overall.

The Senators replaced the traded Patrick Lalime with Dominik Hasek as the Senators' starting goaltender. Due to this signing, centerman Jason Spezza would wear number 19, previously Hasek's number as 39.

== NHL lockout ==
The NHL Chairman of the Board, Harley Hotchkiss was a key figure in the resolution of the labour dispute. Initially taking a low key role, Hotchkiss was thrust into the spotlight when he was invited by National Hockey League Players' Association President Trevor Linden to a last-ditch meeting in January 2005 to save the season. While that meeting was unsuccessful in saving the season, the two would continue to meet until an agreement was finally reached on July 13, 2005. Hotchkiss' role in the negotiations was prominently mentioned when he was voted into the Hockey Hall of Fame in 2006.

Several Senators played with the team's AHL affiliate, the Binghamton Senators, including newly-acquired goaltender Dominik Hasek, who only practiced with the group, and Jason Spezza, who played most of the season with Binghamton.

== Schedule ==
The Senators preseason and regular season schedules were announced on July 14, 2004.

2004–05 schedule
Preseason

Game	Date	Opponent
1	September 25	Toronto Maple Leafs
2	September 26	@ Montreal Canadiens
3	September 28	Pittsburgh Penguins
4	September 29	Florida Panthers
5	September 30	@ Pittsburgh Penguins
6	October 2	@ Toronto Maple Leafs
7	October 9	Montreal Canadiens

Regular season

Game	Date	Opponent
1	October 13	Montreal Canadiens
2	October 16	@ Toronto Maple Leafs
3	October 21	Toronto Maple Leafs
4	October 23	Philadelphia Flyers
5	October 27	@ Carolina Hurricanes
6	October 28	Los Angeles Kings
7	October 30	New Jersey Devils
8	November 1	Boston Bruins
9	November 5	@ Washington Capitals
10	November 6	New York Rangers
11	November 9	Florida Panthers
12	November 12	Montreal Canadiens
13	November 13	@ Montreal Canadiens
14	November 16	@ New Jersey Devils
15	November 18	Dallas Stars
16	November 20	Tampa Bay Lightning
17	November 24	@ Pittsburgh Penguins
18	November 26	@ Boston Bruins
19	November 30	@ New York Islanders
20	December 2	@ Boston Bruins
21	December 4	Minnesota Wild
22	December 6	@ New York Rangers
23	December 7	@ Pittsburgh Penguins
24	December 10	@ Atlanta Thrashers
25	December 11	@ Tampa Bay Lightning
26	December 13	Philadelphia Flyers
27	December 16	Calgary Flames
28	December 18	Boston Bruins
29	December 19	@ Detroit Red Wings
30	December 21	@ Nashville Predators
31	December 23	@ Colorado Avalanche
32	December 26	New York Islanders
33	December 28	@ Washington Capitals
34	December 30	Carolina Hurricanes
35	January 1	Atlanta Thrashers
36	January 5	@ Buffalo Sabres
37	January 6	Florida Panthers
38	January 8	Pittsburgh Penguins
39	January 10	Toronto Maple Leafs
40	January 12	@ Vancouver Canucks
41	January 14	@ Calgary Flames
42	January 15	@ Edmonton Oilers
43	January 18	New York Rangers
44	January 20	Toronto Maple Leafs
45	January 22	Buffalo Sabres
46	January 23	@ Chicago Blackhawks
47	January 25	Pittsburgh Penguins
48	January 28	@ Carolina Hurricanes
49	January 29	@ Toronto Maple Leafs
50	February 1	Washington Capitals
51	February 3	@ New York Islanders
52	February 5	San Jose Sharks
53	February 7	Vancouver Canucks
54	February 8	@ Buffalo Sabres
55	February 10	Carolina Hurricanes
56	February 15	@ Tampa Bay Lightning
57	February 16	@ Florida Panthers
58	February 19	@ Montreal Canadiens
59	February 21	Edmonton Oilers
60	February 24	Atlanta Thrashers
61	February 26	Tampa Bay Lightning
62	February 28	@ Philadelphia Flyers
63	March 3	Boston Bruins
64	March 5	New Jersey Devils
65	March 7	@ Florida Panthers
66	March 9	@ Atlanta Thrashers
67	March 11	@ Buffalo Sabres
68	March 12	@ Toronto Maple Leafs
69	March 15	Montreal Canadiens
70	March 17	Anaheim Mighty Ducks
71	March 19	Phoenix Coyotes
72	March 21	@ Boston Bruins
73	March 22	@ St. Louis Blues
74	March 24	@ Philadelphia Flyers
75	March 26	Buffalo Sabres
76	March 28	Washington Capitals
77	March 29	@ New Jersey Devils
78	April 1	Buffalo Sabres
79	April 2	@ Columbus Blue Jackets
80	April 6	@ New York Rangers
81	April 8	New York Islanders
82	April 9	@ Montreal Canadiens

== Transactions ==
The Senators were involved in the following transactions from June 8, 2004, the day after the deciding game of the 2004 Stanley Cup Finals, through February 16, 2005, the day the 2004–05 season was officially cancelled.

=== Trades ===
Date	Details		Ref
June 26, 2004	To Los Angeles Kings: Radek Bonk	To Ottawa Senators: 3rd-round pick in 2004	
June 27, 2004	To St. Louis Blues: Patrick Lalime	To Ottawa Senators: Conditional 4th-round pick in 2005	

=== Players acquired ===
Date	Player	Former team	Term	Via	Ref
July 6, 2004	Dominik Hasek	Detroit Red Wings	multi-year	Free agency	
July 27, 2004	Pat Kavanagh	Vancouver Canucks	multi-year	Free agency	
August 11, 2004	Jesse Fibiger	San Jose Sharks	1-year	Free agency	

=== Players lost ===
Date	Player	New team	Via (Note: In parentheses is the player’s free agency group on July 1 if applicable.)	Ref
July 1, 2004	Jody Hull (Note: Hull retired.)		Contract expiration (III)	
July 1, 2004	Curtis Leschyshyn (Note: Leschyshyn was inactive during the 2004–05 season.)		Contract expiration (III)	
July 1, 2004	Rob Ray (Note: Ray retired.)		Contract expiration (III)	
July 1, 2004	Shaun Van Allen (Note: Van Allen retired.)		Contract expiration (III)	
July 20, 2004	Brad Tapper	Nurnberg Ice Tigers (DEL)	Free agency (VI)	
July 22, 2004	Andrew Allen	Trenton Titans (ECHL)	Free agency (UFA)	
July 23, 2004	Serge Payer	Florida Panthers	Free agency (VI)	
December 16, 2004	Todd Simpson	Herning Blue Fox (Denmark)	Free agency (III)	
January 17, 2005	Peter Bondra	HK Poprad (Slovakia)	Free agency (III)	

=== Signings ===
Date	Player	Term	Contract type	Ref
July 15, 2004	Brian Pothier	2-year	Re-signing	
July 15, 2004	Martin Prusek	1-year	Re-signing	
August 6, 2004	Chris Phillips	3-year	Re-signing	
August 6, 2004	Peter Schaefer	2-year	Re-signing	
August 10, 2004	Zdeno Chara	2-year	Re-signing	
August 13, 2004	Denis Hamel	1-year	Option exercised	
August 13, 2004	Josh Langfeld	1-year	Option exercised	
September 8, 2004	Brandon Bochenski	2-year	Entry-level	
September 10, 2004	Chris Kelly	multi-year	Re-signing	
September 15, 2004	Martin Havlat	1-year	Re-signing	
September 15, 2004	Vaclav Varada	multi-year	Re-signing	

== Draft picks ==
Ottawa's draft picks from the 2004 NHL entry draft held on June 26 and June 27, 2004 at the RBC Center in Raleigh, North Carolina.

Round	#	Player	Nationality	College/junior/club team (League)
1	23	Andrej Meszaros	Slovakia	Dukla Trenčín (Slovak Extraliga)
2	58	Kirill Lyamin	Russia	CSKA Moscow (RSL)
3	77	Shawn Weller	United States	Capital District Selects (EJHL)
3	87	Peter Regin	Denmark	Herning IK (Oddset Ligaen)
3	89	Jeff Glass	Canada	Kootenay Ice (WHL)
4	122	Alexander Nikulin	Russia	CSKA Moscow (RSL)
5	141	Jim McKenzie	United States	Sioux Falls Stampede (USHL)
5	156	Roman Wick	Switzerland	Kloten Flyers (NLA)
7	219	Joe Cooper	Canada	Miami University (NCHC)
8	251	Matt McIlvane	United States	Chicago Steel (USHL)
9	284	John Wikner	Sweden	Västra Frolunda (Elitserien)

== Farm teams ==
=== Binghamton Senators ===
The Senators named Dave Cameron the head coach of the team for the 2004–05 season. John Paddock remained with the club as a co-coach with Cameron.

Binghamton finished in first place in the East Division with a record of 47–21–7–5, earning 103 points. In the post-season, the Senators were upset by the Wilkes-Barre/Scranton Penguins in the division semi-finals.

Jason Spezza led the league with 117 points, winning the John B. Sollenberger Trophy for the top scorer in the AHL, as well as winning the Les Cunningham Award for league MVP. Denis Hamel scored a team high 39 goals. Ray Emery led the club with 28 wins, while Billy Thompson had a team best 2.44 GAA and a .920 save percentage.

=== Charlotte Checkers ===
Ottawa announced a new affiliation with the Charlotte Checkers of the ECHL beginning in the 2004–05 season. The club was coached by Derek Wilkinson.

The Checkers finished the season with a 39–26–2–5 record, earning 85 points and third place in the East Division and seventh place in the American Conference. In the playoffs, the Checkers upset the Columbia Inferno and the Gwinnett Gladiators before losing to the Florida Everblades in the conference finals.

Offensively, the team was led by Dusty Jamieson, who scored a team high 31 goals. Eduard Pershin led the club with 67 points. Senators prospect Kelly Guard earned 12 wins with a 3.06 GAA and a .901 save percentage in his first professional season.
