= List of NHL franchise post-season appearance streaks =

These are lists of active and all-time National Hockey League (NHL) franchise post-season appearance, post-season series win, Stanley Cup Finals and Stanley Cup streaks up to and including the 2024–25 NHL season and subsequent 2025 Stanley Cup playoffs. These lists do not include the canceled 2004–05 NHL season.

== Longest active streaks ==
=== Post-season appearance streaks ===
A post-season appearance streak is continued by making the NHL playoffs in consecutive years after the regular season. Since the first round of the playoffs normally consists of eight series, there will always be sixteen teams on this list (of the thirty-two teams in the NHL).

Team	Postseason streak	Last missed post-season	Stanley Cup Championships during streak
Colorado Avalanche	9 seasons	2016–17	1 : 2021–22
Tampa Bay Lightning	9 seasons	2016–17	2 : 2019–20, 2020–21
Carolina Hurricanes	8 seasons	2017–18	1 : 2025–26
Edmonton Oilers	7 seasons	2018–19	
Dallas Stars	5 seasons	2020–21	
Los Angeles Kings	5 seasons	2020–21	
Vegas Golden Knights	4 seasons	2021–22	1 : 2022–23
Minnesota Wild	2 seasons	2023–24	
Montreal Canadiens	2 seasons	2023–24	
Ottawa Senators	2 seasons	2023–24	
Anaheim Ducks	1 season	2024–25	
Boston Bruins	1 season	2024–25	
Buffalo Sabres	1 season	2024–25	
Philadelphia Flyers	1 season	2024–25	
Pittsburgh Penguins	1 season	2024–25	
Utah Mammoth	1 season	2024–25	

=== Post-season opening round series win streaks ===
This is a list of teams that have active post-season series win streaks as of the 2026 Stanley Cup playoffs. A post-season series win streak is continued by making the post-season and winning at least the first-round series of the playoffs. Since the first round of the playoffs consists of sixteen teams in eight series, there will always be eight teams in this list, the winners of those series.

Team	Postseason series win streak
Carolina Hurricanes	8 seasons
Vegas Golden Knights	2 seasons
Anaheim Ducks	1 season
Buffalo Sabres	1 season
Colorado Avalanche	1 season
Minnesota Wild	1 season
Montreal Canadiens	1 season
Philadelphia Flyers	1 season

== Longest all-time streaks ==
=== Post-season appearance streaks ===
This section has been updated to include teams who appeared in the 2026 Stanley Cup playoffs.

Active franchise streak is highlighted

Team	Postseason streak	Consecutive post-season appearances	Stanley Cup Championships during streak
Boston Bruins	29 seasons^{1}	1967–68 through to 1995–96	2 : 1969–70, 1971–72
Chicago Black Hawks/Blackhawks^{2}	28 seasons	1969–70 through to 1996–97	none
St. Louis Blues	25 seasons	1979–80 through to 2003–04	none
Detroit Red Wings	25 seasons^{3}	1990–91 through to 2015–16	4 : 1996–97, 1997–98, 2001–02, 2007–08
Montreal Canadiens	24 seasons^{4}	1970–71 through to 1993–94	8 : 1970–71, 1972–73, 1975–76, 1976–77, 1977–78, 1978–79, 1985–86, 1992–93
Montreal Canadiens	21 seasons^{4}	1948–49 through to 1968–69	10 : 1952–53, 1955–56, 1956–57, 1957–58, 1958–59, 1959–60, 1964–65, 1965–66, 1967–68, 1968–69
Detroit Red Wings	20 seasons	1938–39 through to 1957–58	5 : 1942–43, 1949–50, 1951–52, 1953–54, 1954–55
Philadelphia Flyers	17 seasons	1972–73 through to 1988–89	2 : 1973–74, 1974–75
Atlanta Flames/Calgary Flames	16 seasons^{5}	1975–76 through to 1990–91	1 : 1988–89
Pittsburgh Penguins	16 seasons	2006–07 through to 2021–22	3 : 2008–09, 2015–16, 2016–17
Toronto Maple Leafs	15 seasons	1930–31 through to 1944–45	3 : 1931–32, 1941–42, 1944–45

^{1} The Bruins' 29 consecutive is the second longest post-season streak in North American major professional sports history, and the longest of the "Big 4". This compares to the CFL's Edmonton Elks (then named the Eskimos) 37 consecutive, the NBA's Syracuse Nationals/Philadelphia 76ers and San Antonio Spurs 22 consecutive, the MLB's Atlanta Braves 14 consecutive, the MLS' Seattle Sounders FC 12 consecutive, and the NFL's New England Patriots 11 consecutive.
^{2} The nickname of the Chicago team was the "Black Hawks" for the majority of the streak – 17 of the 28 seasons. They were renamed the "Blackhawks" in 1986.
^{3} No post season occurred in 2005 due to the season long NHL lockout.
^{4} The Montreal Canadiens only missed the playoffs once – by a tie-breaker – in the 46 seasons from 1948–49 to 1993–94. In the 1969–70 season, they tied for fourth and last playoff spot with the New York Rangers, but were eliminated on total goals scored tiebreak (they scored 244 goals to New York's 246).
^{5} Includes 5 seasons as the Atlanta Flames (1975–76 through 1979–80), and 11 seasons as the Calgary Flames (1980–81 through 1990–91)

=== Post-season series win streaks ===
Consecutive seasons with at least one series victory.

Team	Postseason win streak	Consecutive post-season wins	Stanley Cup Championships during streak
Montreal Canadiens	10 seasons	1950–51 through to 1959–60	6 : 1952–53, 1955–56, 1956–57, 1957–58, 1958–59, 1959–60
Montreal Canadiens	10 seasons	1983–84 through to 1992–93	2 : 1985–86, 1992–93
Philadelphia Flyers	9 seasons	1972–73 through to 1980–81	2 : 1973–74, 1974–75
Carolina Hurricanes	8 seasons	2018–19 through to present	1 : 2025–26
New York Islanders	7 seasons	1978–79 through to 1984–85	4 : 1979–80, 1980–81, 1981–82, 1982–83
Chicago Black Hawks	6 seasons	1969–70 through to 1974–75	none
Montreal Canadiens	6 seasons	1974–75 through to 1979–80	4 : 1975–76, 1976–77, 1977–78, 1978–79
Edmonton Oilers	6 seasons	1982–83 through to 1987–88	4 : 1983–84, 1984–85, 1986–87, 1987–88
Detroit Red Wings	6 seasons	1994–95 through to 1999–2000	2 : 1996–97, 1997–98
Montreal Canadiens	5 seasons	1964–65 through to 1968–69	4 : 1964–65, 1965–66, 1967–68, 1968–69
Toronto Maple Leafs	5 seasons	1974–75 through to 1978–79	none
Boston Bruins	5 seasons	1975–76 through to 1979–80	none
New York Rangers	5 seasons	1978–79 through to 1982–83	none
Boston Bruins	5 seasons	1987–88 through to 1991–92	none
Detroit Red Wings	5 seasons	2006–07 through to 2010–11	1 : 2007–08

=== Stanley Cup Finals appearance streaks ===
Team	Stanley Cup Finals appearance streak	Consecutive Stanley Cup Finals appearances	Stanley Cup Championships during streak
Montreal Canadiens	10 seasons	1950–51 through to 1959–60	6 : 1952–53, 1955–56, 1956–57, 1957–58, 1958–59, 1959–60
Montreal Canadiens	5 seasons	1964–65 through to 1968–69	4 : 1964–65, 1965–66, 1967–68, 1968–69
New York Islanders	5 seasons	1979–80 through to 1983–84	4 : 1979–80, 1980–81, 1981–82, 1982–83
Montreal Canadiens	4 seasons	1975–76 through to 1978–79	4 : 1975–76, 1976–77, 1977–78, 1978–79
Toronto Maple Leafs	3 seasons	1937–38 through to 1939–40	none
Detroit Red Wings	3 seasons	1940–41 through to 1942–43	1 : 1942–43
Toronto Maple Leafs	3 seasons	1946–47 through to 1948–49	3 : 1946–47, 1947–48, 1948–49
Detroit Red Wings	3 seasons	1947–48 through to 1949–50	1 : 1949–50
Detroit Red Wings	3 seasons	1953–54 through to 1955–56	2 : 1953–54, 1954–55
Toronto Maple Leafs	3 seasons	1961–62 through to 1963–64	3 : 1961–62, 1962–63, 1963–64
St. Louis Blues	3 seasons	1967–68 through to 1969–70	none
Philadelphia Flyers	3 seasons	1973–74 through to 1975–76	2 : 1973–74, 1974–75
Edmonton Oilers	3 seasons	1982–83 through to 1984–85	2 : 1983–84, 1984–85
Tampa Bay Lightning	3 seasons	2019–20 through to 2021–22	2 : 2019–20, 2020–21
Florida Panthers	3 seasons	2022–23 through to 2024–25	2 : 2023–24, 2024–25

=== Stanley Cup win streaks ===
Team	Stanley Cup win streak	Consecutive Stanley Cup wins
Montreal Canadiens	5 seasons	1955–56 through to 1959–60
Montreal Canadiens	4 seasons	1975–76 through to 1978–79
New York Islanders	4 seasons	1979–80 through to 1982–83
Toronto Maple Leafs	3 seasons	1946–47 through to 1948–49
Toronto Maple Leafs	3 seasons	1961–62 through to 1963–64
Ottawa Senators^{1}	2 seasons	1919–20, 1920–21
Montreal Canadiens	2 seasons	1929–30, 1930–31
Detroit Red Wings	2 seasons	1935–36, 1936–37
Detroit Red Wings	2 seasons	1953–54, 1954–55
Montreal Canadiens	2 seasons	1964–65, 1965–66
Montreal Canadiens	2 seasons	1967–68, 1968–69
Philadelphia Flyers	2 seasons	1973–74, 1974–75
Edmonton Oilers	2 seasons	1983–84, 1984–85
Edmonton Oilers	2 seasons	1986–87, 1987–88
Pittsburgh Penguins	2 seasons	1990–91, 1991–92
Detroit Red Wings	2 seasons	1996–97, 1997–98
Pittsburgh Penguins	2 seasons	2015–16, 2016–17
Tampa Bay Lightning	2 seasons	2019–20, 2020–21
Florida Panthers	2 seasons	2023–24, 2024–25

^{1} Not the current Ottawa franchise. This franchise, an original member of the NHL, folded following the 1934–35 NHL season after playing one year as the St. Louis Eagles.

=== Most consecutive post-season series winning streaks ===
This is a sortable table of all 32 current NHL teams. Four teams have multiple series winning streaks where they won an equal number of playoff series before a series loss.

^	Denotes active streaks

Team	Seasons^{[a]}	Series won	Playoff series	Opponent	Streak ending loss
Anaheim Ducks	2007	4	2007 conference quarterfinals 2007 conference semifinals 2007 conference finals 2007 Stanley Cup Final	Wild; Canucks; Red Wings; Senators	2008 conference quarterfinals (Stars)
Boston Bruins	2011	4	2011 conference quarterfinals 2011 conference semifinals 2011 conference finals 2011 Stanley Cup Final	Canadiens; Flyers; Lightning; Canucks	2012 conference quarterfinals (Capitals)
Buffalo Sabres	1999	3	1999 conference quarterfinals 1999 conference semifinals 1999 conference finals	Senators; Bruins; Maple Leafs	1999 Stanley Cup Final (Stars)
Calgary Flames	1989	4	1989 division semifinals 1989 division finals 1989 conference finals 1989 Stanley Cup Final	Canucks; Kings; Blackhawks; Canadiens	1990 division semifinals (Kings)
Carolina Hurricanes	2006, 2009	6	2006 conference quarterfinals 2006 conference semifinals 2006 conference finals 2006 Stanley Cup Final; 2009 conference quarterfinals 2009 conference semifinals	Canadiens; Devils; Sabres; Oilers; Devils; Bruins	2009 conference finals (Penguins)
Chicago Blackhawks	2013–2014	6	2013 conference quarterfinals 2013 conference semifinals 2013 conference finals 2013 Stanley Cup Final; 2014 first round 2014 second round	Wild; Red Wings; Kings; Bruins; Blues; Wild	2014 conference finals (Kings)
Colorado Avalanche	2001–2002	6	2001 conference quarterfinals 2001 conference semifinals 2001 conference finals 2001 Stanley Cup Final; 2002 conference quarterfinals 2002 conference semifinals	Canucks; Kings; Blues; Devils; Kings; Sharks	2002 conference finals (Red Wings)
Columbus Blue Jackets; 2 (1 win) streaks	2019	1	2019 first round	Lightning	2019 second round (Bruins)
Columbus Blue Jackets; 2 (1 win) streaks	2020	1	2020 qualifying round	Maple Leafs	2020 first round (Lightning)
Dallas Stars	1999–2000	7	1999 conference quarterfinals 1999 conference semifinals 1999 conference finals 1999 Stanley Cup Final; 2000 conference quarterfinals 2000 conference semifinals 2000 conference finals	Oilers; Blues; Avalanche; Sabres; Oilers; Sharks; Avalanche	2000 Stanley Cup Final (Devils)
Detroit Red Wings	1997–1999	9	1997 conference quarterfinals 1997 conference semifinals 1997 conference finals 1997 Stanley Cup Final; 1998 conference quarterfinals 1998 conference semifinals 1998 conference finals 1998 Stanley Cup Final; 1999 conference quarterfinals	Blues; Mighty Ducks; Avalanche; Flyers; Coyotes; Blues; Stars; Capitals; Mighty Ducks	1999 conference semifinals (Avalanche)
Edmonton Oilers	1984–1986	9	1984 division semifinals 1984 division finals 1984 conference finals 1984 Stanley Cup Final; 1985 division semifinals 1985 division finals 1985 conference finals 1985 Stanley Cup Final; 1986 division semifinals	Jets; Flames; North Stars; Islanders; Kings; Jets; Black Hawks; Flyers; Canucks	1986 division finals (Flames)
Florida Panthers ^	2024–2025	8	2024 first round 2024 second round 2024 conference finals 2024 Stanley Cup Final; 2025 first round 2025 second round 2025 conference finals 2025 Stanley Cup Final	Lightning; Bruins; Rangers; Oilers; Lightning; Maple Leafs; Hurricanes; Oilers	TBD
Los Angeles Kings	2012–2013	6	2012 conference quarterfinals 2012 conference semifinals 2012 conference finals 2012 Stanley Cup Final; 2013 conference quarterfinals 2013 conference semifinals	Canucks; Blues; Coyotes; Devils; Blues; Sharks	2013 conference finals (Blackhawks)
Minnesota Wild	2003	2	2003 conference quarterfinals 2003 conference semifinals	Avalanche; Canucks	2003 conference finals (Mighty Ducks)
Montreal Canadiens	1976–1980	13	1976 quarterfinals 1976 semifinals 1976 Stanley Cup Final; 1977 quarterfinals 1977 semifinals 1977 Stanley Cup Final; 1978 quarterfinals 1978 semifinals 1978 Stanley Cup Final; 1979 quarterfinals 1979 semifinals 1979 Stanley Cup Final; 1980 preliminary round	Black Hawks; Islanders; Flyers; Blues; Islanders; Bruins; Red Wings; Maple Leafs; Bruins; Maple Leafs; Bruins; Rangers; Whalers	1980 quarterfinals (North Stars)
Nashville Predators	2017	3	2017 first round 2017 second round 2017 conference finals	Blackhawks; Blues; Ducks	2017 Stanley Cup Final (Penguins)
New Jersey Devils	2000–2001	7	2000 conference quarterfinals 2000 conference semifinals 2000 conference finals 2000 Stanley Cup Final; 2001 conference quarterfinals 2001 conference semifinals 2001 conference finals	Panthers; Maple Leafs; Flyers; Stars; Hurricanes; Maple Leafs; Penguins	2001 Stanley Cup Final (Avalanche)
New York Islanders	1980–1984	19	1980 preliminary round 1980 quarterfinals 1980 semifinals 1980 Stanley Cup Final; 1981 preliminary round 1981 quarterfinals 1981 semifinals 1981 Stanley Cup Final; 1982 division semifinals 1982 division finals 1982 conference finals 1982 Stanley Cup Final; 1983 division semifinals 1983 division finals 1983 conference finals 1983 Stanley Cup Final; 1984 division semifinals 1984 division finals 1984 conference finals	Kings; Bruins; Sabres; Flyers; Maple Leafs; Oilers; Rangers; North Stars; Penguins; Rangers; Nordiques; Canucks; Capitals; Rangers; Bruins; Oilers; Rangers; Capitals; Canadiens	1984 Stanley Cup Final (Oilers)
New York Rangers; 2 (5 win) streaks	1928–1929	5	1928 quarterfinals 1928 semifinals 1928 Stanley Cup Final; 1929 quarterfinals 1929 semifinals	Pirates; Bruins; Maroons; Americans; Maple Leafs	1929 Stanley Cup Final (Bruins)
New York Rangers; 2 (5 win) streaks	1994–1995	5	1994 conference quarterfinals 1994 conference semifinals 1994 conference finals 1994 Stanley Cup Final; 1995 conference quarterfinals	Islanders; Capitals; Devils; Canucks; Nordiques	1995 conference semifinals (Flyers)
Ottawa Senators	2007	3	2007 conference quarterfinals 2007 conference semifinals 2007 conference finals	Penguins; Devils; Sabres	2007 Stanley Cup Final (Ducks)
Philadelphia Flyers	1974–1976	8	1974 quarterfinals 1974 semifinals 1974 Stanley Cup Final; 1975 quarterfinals 1975 semifinals 1975 Stanley Cup Final; 1976 quarterfinals 1976 semifinals	Flames; Rangers; Bruins; Maple Leafs; Islanders; Sabres; Maple Leafs; Bruins	1976 Stanley Cup Final (Canadiens)
Pittsburgh Penguins; 2 (9 win) streaks	1991–1993	9	1991 division semifinals 1991 division finals 1991 conference finals 1991 Stanley Cup Final; 1992 division semifinals 1992 division finals 1992 conference finals 1992 Stanley Cup Final; 1993 division semifinals	Devils; Capitals; Bruins; North Stars; Capitals; Rangers; Bruins; Blackhawks; Devils	1993 division finals (Islanders)
Pittsburgh Penguins; 2 (9 win) streaks	2016–2018	9	2016 first round 2016 second round 2016 conference finals 2016 Stanley Cup Final; 2017 first round 2017 second round 2017 conference finals 2017 Stanley Cup Final; 2018 first round	Rangers; Capitals; Lightning; Sharks; Blue Jackets; Capitals; Senators; Predators; Flyers	2018 second round (Capitals)
San Jose Sharks	2016	3	2016 first round 2016 second round 2016 conference finals	Kings; Predators; Blues	2016 Stanley Cup Final (Penguins)
Seattle Kraken	2023	1	2023 first round	Avalanche	2023 second round (Stars)
St. Louis Blues	2019	4	2019 first round 2019 second round 2019 conference finals 2019 Stanley Cup Final	Jets; Stars; Sharks; Bruins	2020 first round (Canucks)
Tampa Bay Lightning	2020–2022	11	2020 first round 2020 second round 2020 conference finals 2020 Stanley Cup Final; 2021 first round 2021 second round 2021 Stanley Cup semifinals 2021 Stanley Cup Final; 2022 first round 2022 second round 2022 conference finals	Blue Jackets; Bruins; Islanders; Stars; Panthers; Hurricanes; Islanders; Canadiens; Maple Leafs; Panthers; Rangers	2022 Stanley Cup Final (Avalanche)
Toronto Maple Leafs	1945, 1947–1949	8	1945 semifinals 1945 Stanley Cup Final; 1947 semifinals 1947 Stanley Cup Final; 1948 semifinals 1948 Stanley Cup Final; 1949 semifinals 1949 Stanley Cup Final	Canadiens; Red Wings; Red Wings; Canadiens; Bruins; Red Wings; Bruins; Red Wings	1950 semifinals (Red Wings)
Vancouver Canucks; 3 (3 win) streaks	1982	3	1982 division semifinals 1982 division finals 1982 conference finals	Flames; Kings; Black Hawks	1982 Stanley Cup Final (Islanders)
Vancouver Canucks; 3 (3 win) streaks	1994	3	1994 conference quarterfinals 1994 conference semifinals 1994 conference finals	Flames; Stars; Maple Leafs	1994 Stanley Cup Final (Rangers)
Vancouver Canucks; 3 (3 win) streaks	2011	3	2011 conference quarterfinals 2011 conference semifinals 2011 conference finals	Blackhawks; Predators; Sharks	2011 Stanley Cup Final (Bruins)
Vegas Golden Knights	2023	4	2023 first round 2023 second round 2023 conference finals 2023 Stanley Cup Final	Jets; Oilers; Stars; Panthers	2024 first round (Stars)
Utah Mammoth	None	0	None	None	None
Washington Capitals	2018	4	2018 first round 2018 second round 2018 conference finals 2018 Stanley Cup Final	Blue Jackets; Penguins; Lightning; Golden Knights	2019 first round (Hurricanes)
Winnipeg Jets	2018	2	2018 first round 2018 second round	Wild; Predators	2018 conference finals (Golden Knights)
Team	Streak lasted	Series won	Playoff series	Opponent	Streak ending loss

- ^{[a]} Season represents the year(s) the playoff series occurred.

== See also ==
- List of NHL franchise post-season droughts
- List of Stanley Cup appearances
- List of Stanley Cup champions
- List of Major League Baseball franchise postseason streaks
- List of NBA franchise postseason streaks
- List of NFL franchise post-season streaks
