= List of Atlanta Flames seasons =

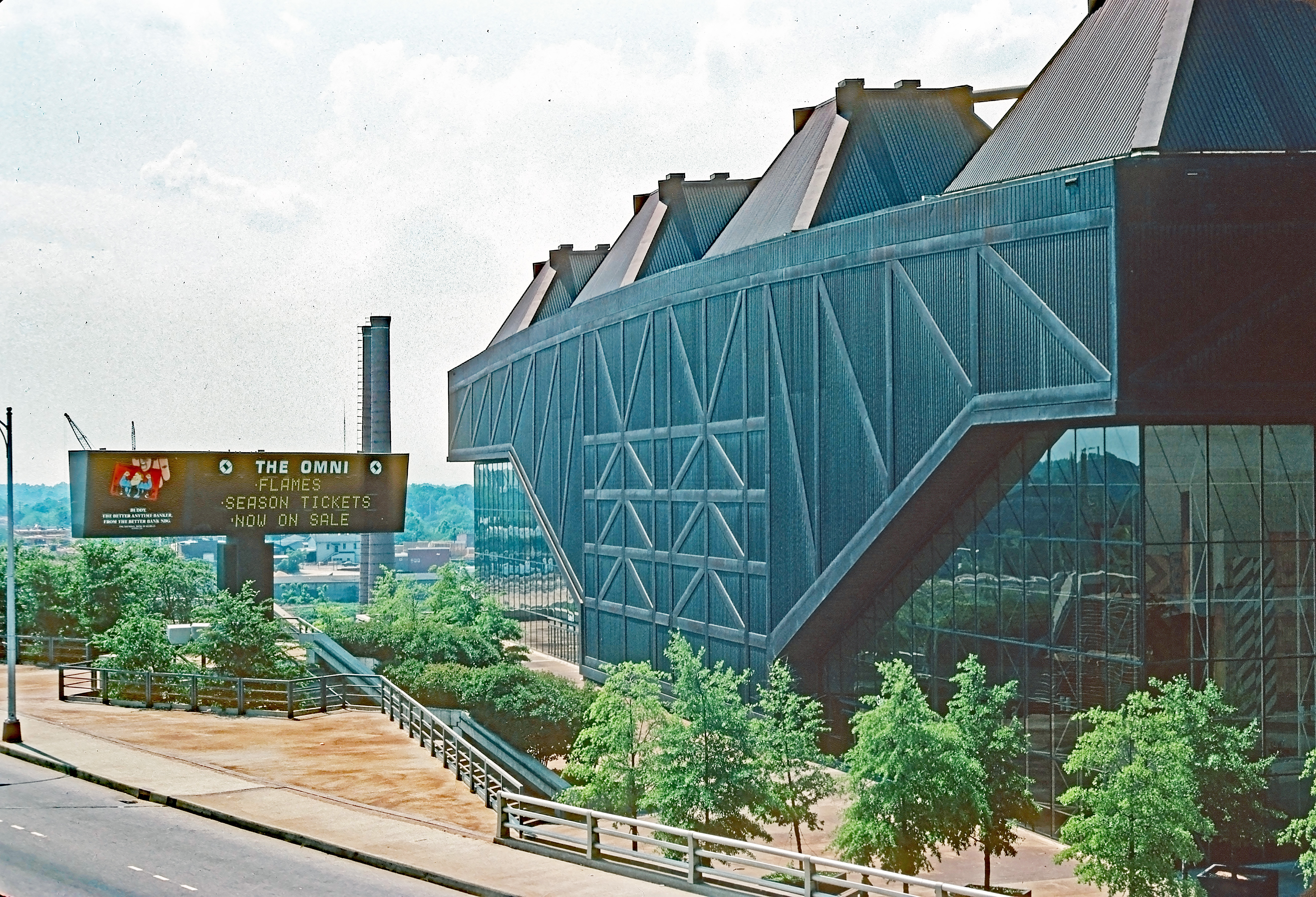
The exterior of the Omni Coliseum in 1979

The Atlanta Flames were a professional ice hockey team based in Atlanta. They were members of the Patrick Division in the Campbell Conference of the National Hockey League (NHL). Founded on November 9, 1971, as an expansion franchise, the Flames played their home games at the Omni Coliseum from their inaugural season in 1972 until their relocation to Calgary, Alberta, in 1980. The 1979–80 NHL season marked the eighth and final year of operation for the franchise. At the end of the 1979–80 season, the Flames had won 268 regular season games, appeared in the playoffs six times, had not won any division or conference championships, and never advanced past the first round of the Stanley Cup playoffs.

The Flames started play in the 1972–73 season along with the New York Islanders; they both missed the playoffs, ranking as the 7th and 8th teams in their respective conferences. In the 1973–74 season, the Flames qualified for the playoffs despite having a losing record, pairing them against the first-seeded Philadelphia Flyers in the quarterfinals. The Flames lost the series in a sweep, being outscored 6–17. The Flames failed to make the playoffs for the next season in the realigned Patrick Division, being the only team that failed to qualify. From the 1975–76 season onward, the Flames made a postseason appearance every year until their relocation in 1980. The Flames qualified last in their division two years in a row and were paired against the Los Angeles Kings twice, losing 0–2 and 1–2, respectively. In the 1977–78 and 1978–79 seasons, the Flames improved their play but could not advance past the first round of the playoffs, losing to the Detroit Red Wings and Toronto Maple Leafs respectively in two games. In their final season, the Flames finished 9th out of 21 teams in the league and were paired against the team that had finished 8th, the New York Rangers. In an expanded best-of-five preliminary round, the Flames only won one game out of four to be eliminated from the playoffs. Following the 1980 playoffs, owner Tom Cousins announced that he would sell the team following financial losses and low attendance. Nelson Skalbania and his ownership group bought the franchise and moved it to Calgary on June 24, 1980, leaving Atlanta without an NHL franchise.

Since the Flames' relocation and rebranding as the Calgary Flames in 1980, ice hockey in Atlanta has been an interest of the NHL. In 1997, the Atlanta Thrashers were founded as an expansion franchise after the Atlanta Knights in the International Hockey League (IHL) relocated to Quebec City; the Thrashers began play in 1999. From 1999 to 2011, the Thrashers had very limited success, only winning their division once in 2007, when they also made their only playoff appearance in franchise history. Due to financial losses and ownership struggles, the franchise was sold and moved to Winnipeg, Manitoba, as the second iteration of the Winnipeg Jets. Atlanta went without an official professional hockey franchise until 2015, when the Gwinnett Gladiators rebranded into the Atlanta Gladiators. As an affiliate of the Nashville Predators and Milwaukee Admirals, the Gladiators compete in the East Coast Hockey League. In 2024, a sports and entertainment group led by former NHL player Anson Carter requested that the NHL start an expansion process for Atlanta.

== Table key ==
Key of terms and abbreviations
Term or abbreviation	Definition
Finish	Final position in division or league standings
GP	Number of games played
W	Number of wins
L	Number of losses
T	Number of ties
Pts	Number of points
GF	Goals for (goals scored by the Flames)
GA	Goals against (goals scored by the Flames' opponents)
—	Does not apply

== Year by year ==
Full list of Atlanta Flames seasons
NHL season	Flames season	Conference	Division	Regular season								Postseason					
NHL season	Flames season	Conference	Division	Finish	GP	W	L	T	Pts	GF	GA	GP	W	L	GF	GA	Playoffs result
1972–73	1972–73	—	West	7th	78	25	38	15	65	191	239	—	—	—	—	—	Did not qualify
1973–74	1973–74	—	West	4th	78	30	34	14	74	214	238	4	0	4	6	17	Lost quarterfinals to Philadelphia Flyers, 0–4
1974–75	1974–75	Campbell (Note: The NHL realigned prior to the 1974–75 season. The Flames were placed in the Campbell Conference's Patrick Division.)	Patrick	4th	80	34	31	15	83	243	233	—	—	—	—	—	Did not qualify
1975–76	1975–76	Campbell	Patrick	3rd	80	35	33	12	82	262	237	2	0	2	1	3	Lost preliminary round to Los Angeles Kings, 0–2
1976–77	1976–77	Campbell	Patrick	3rd	80	34	34	12	80	264	265	3	1	2	7	11	Lost preliminary round to Los Angeles Kings, 1–2
1977–78	1977–78	Campbell	Patrick	3rd	80	34	27	19	87	274	252	2	0	2	5	8	Lost preliminary round to Detroit Red Wings, 0–2
1978–79	1978–79	Campbell	Patrick	4th	80	41	31	8	90	327	280	2	0	2	5	9	Lost preliminary round to Toronto Maple Leafs, 0–2
1979–80	1979–80	Campbell	Patrick	4th	80	35	32	13	83	282	269	4	1	3	8	14	Lost preliminary round to New York Rangers, 1–3
Relocated to Calgary
Totals					636	268	260	108	644	2,057	2,013	17	2	15	32	62	6 playoff appearances

== See also ==
- List of Calgary Flames seasons
- List of Atlanta Thrashers seasons
