= List of Pittsburgh Penguins seasons =

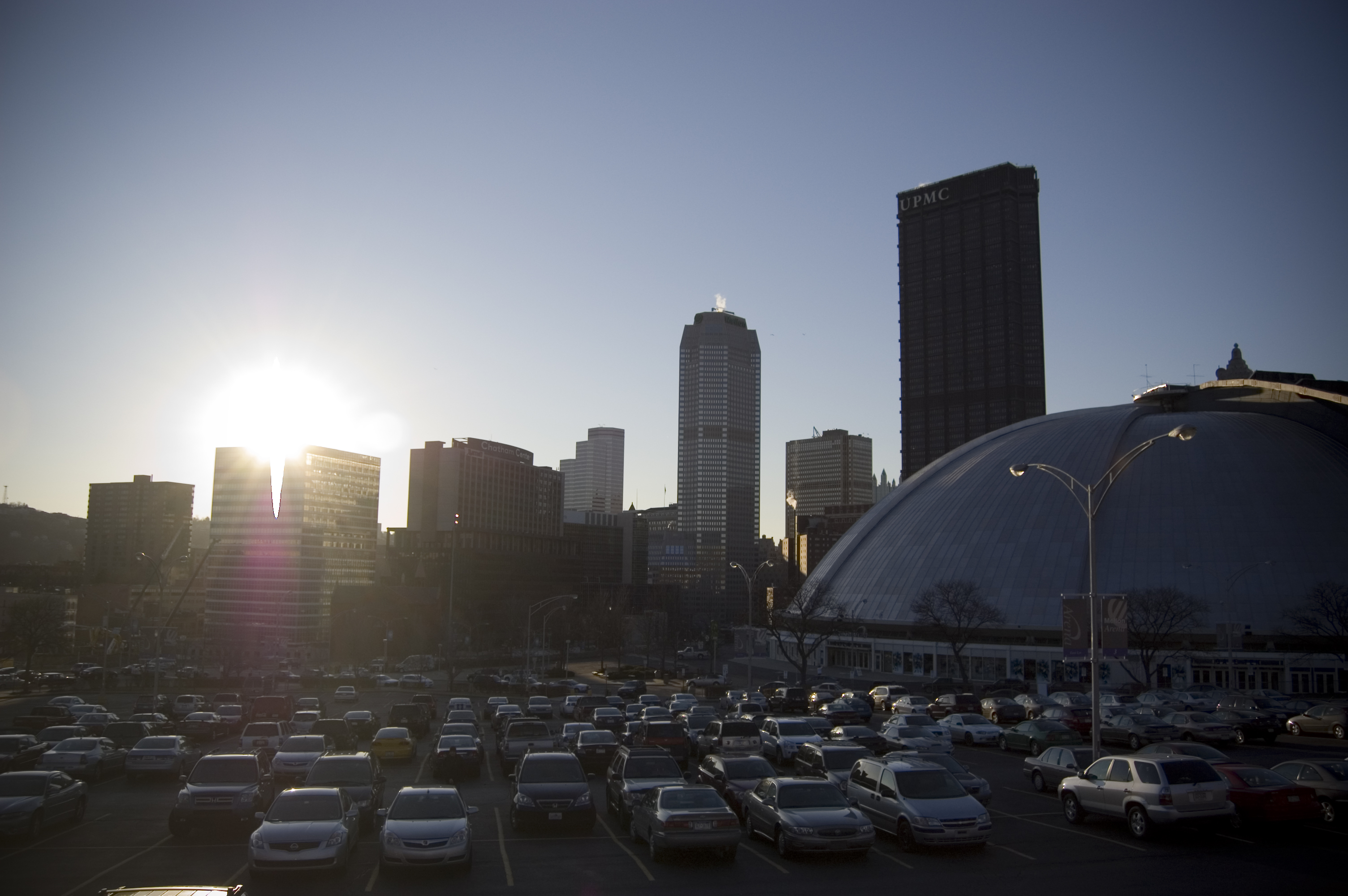
Mellon Arena served as the Penguins' home arena from 1967 to 2010 and saw the team win the Stanley Cup three times. The Penguins name was inspired by the arena, which was nicknamed "The Igloo".

The Pittsburgh Penguins are a professional ice hockey team based in Pittsburgh. The franchise was established as one of six new teams in the 1967 NHL expansion and is a member of the Eastern Conference's Metropolitan Division. The Penguins played their home games at Mellon Arena from the team's inception until 2010, when they moved into the PPG Paints Arena. Pittsburgh has qualified for the playoffs 36 times, winning the Stanley Cup five times: 1991, 1992, 2009, 2016, and 2017. From 2007 to 2022, the Penguins qualified for the playoffs for sixteen consecutive seasons.

== Table key ==
Key of colors and symbols
Color/symbol	Explanation
†	Stanley Cup champions
‡	Conference champions
↑	Division champions
#	Led league in points

Key of terms and abbreviations
Term or abbreviation	Definition
Finish	Final position in division or league standings
GP	Number of games played
W	Number of wins
L	Number of losses
T	Number of ties
OT	Number of losses in overtime (since the 1999–2000 season)
Pts	Number of points
GF	Goals for (goals scored by the Penguins)
GA	Goals against (goals scored by the Penguins' opponents)
—	Does not apply

== Year by year ==
Season	Penguins season	Conference	Division	Regular season									Postseason					
Season	Penguins season	Conference	Division	Finish	GP	W	L	T	OT	Pts	GF	GA	GP	W	L	GF	GA	Result
1967–68	1967–68	—	West	5th	74	27	34	13	—	67	195	216	—	—	—	—	—	Did not qualify
1968–69	1968–69	—	West	5th	76	20	45	11	—	51	189	252	—	—	—	—	—	Did not qualify
1969–70	1969–70	—	West	2nd	76	26	38	12	—	64	182	238	10	6	4	23	25	Won in quarterfinals, 4–0 (Seals); Lost in semifinals, 2–4 (Blues)
1970–71	1970–71	—	West	6th	78	21	37	20	—	62	221	240	—	—	—	—	—	Did not qualify
1971–72	1971–72	—	West	4th	78	26	38	14	—	66	220	258	4	0	4	8	14	Lost in quarterfinals, 0–4 (Black Hawks)
1972–73	1972–73	—	West	5th	78	32	37	9	—	73	257	265	—	—	—	—	—	Did not qualify
1973–74	1973–74	—	West	5th	78	28	41	9	—	65	242	273	—	—	—	—	—	Did not qualify
1974–75	1974–75	Wales^{[a]}	Norris	3rd	80	37	28	15	—	89	326	289	9	5	4	27	27	Won in preliminary round, 2–0 (Blues); Lost in quarterfinals, 3–4 (Islanders)
1975–76	1975–76	Wales	Norris	3rd	80	35	33	12	—	82	339	303	3	1	2	3	8	Lost in preliminary round, 1–2 (Maple Leafs)
1976–77	1976–77	Wales	Norris	3rd	80	34	33	13	—	81	240	252	3	1	2	10	13	Lost in preliminary round, 1–2 (Maple Leafs)
1977–78	1977–78	Wales	Norris	4th	80	25	37	18	—	68	254	321	—	—	—	—	—	Did not qualify
1978–79	1978–79	Wales	Norris	2nd	80	36	31	13	—	85	281	279	7	2	5	16	25	Won in preliminary round, 2–1 (Sabres); Lost in quarterfinals, 0–4 (Bruins)
1979–80	1979–80	Wales	Norris	3rd	80	30	37	13	—	73	251	303	5	2	3	14	21	Lost in preliminary round, 2–3 (Bruins)
1980–81	1980–81	Wales	Norris	4th	80	30	37	13	—	73	302	345	5	2	3	21	20	Lost in preliminary round, 2–3 (Blues)
1981–82	1981–82	Wales	Patrick^{[b]}	4th	80	31	36	13	—	75	310	337	5	2	3	13	22	Lost in division semifinals, 2–3 (Islanders)
1982–83	1982–83	Wales	Patrick	6th	80	18	53	9	—	45	257	394	—	—	—	—	—	Did not qualify
1983–84	1983–84	Wales	Patrick	6th	80	16	58	6	—	38	254	390	—	—	—	—	—	Did not qualify
1984–85	1984–85	Wales	Patrick	6th	80	24	51	5	—	53	276	385	—	—	—	—	—	Did not qualify
1985–86	1985–86	Wales	Patrick	5th	80	34	38	8	—	76	313	305	—	—	—	—	—	Did not qualify
1986–87	1986–87	Wales	Patrick	5th	80	30	38	12	—	72	297	290	—	—	—	—	—	Did not qualify
1987–88	1987–88	Wales	Patrick	6th	80	36	35	9	—	81	319	316	—	—	—	—	—	Did not qualify
1988–89	1988–89	Wales	Patrick	2nd	80	40	33	7	—	87	347	349	11	7	4	43	42	Won in division semifinals, 4–0 (Rangers); Lost in division finals, 3–4 (Flyers)
1989–90	1989–90	Wales	Patrick	5th	80	32	40	8	—	72	318	359	—	—	—	—	—	Did not qualify
1990–91	1990–91	Wales‡	Patrick↑	1st	80	41	33	6	—	88	342	305	24	16	8	95	68	Won in division semifinals, 4–3 (Devils); Won in division finals, 4–1 (Capitals); Won in conference finals, 4–2 (Bruins); Won in Stanley Cup Final, 4–2 (North Stars)†
1991–92	1991–92	Wales‡	Patrick	3rd	80	39	32	9	—	87	343	308	21	16	5	83	63	Won in division semifinals, 4–3 (Capitals); Won in division finals, 4–2 (Rangers); Won in conference finals, 4–0 (Bruins); Won in Stanley Cup Final, 4–0 (Blackhawks)†
1992–93	1992–93	Wales	Patrick↑	1st	84	56	21	7	—	119#	367	268	12	7	5	50	37	Won in division semifinals, 4–1 (Devils); Lost in division finals, 3–4 (Islanders)
1993–94	1993–94	Eastern	Northeast↑^{[c]}	1st	84	44	27	13	—	101	299	285	6	2	4	12	20	Lost in conference quarterfinals, 2–4 (Capitals)
1994–95^{[d]}	1994–95	Eastern	Northeast	2nd	48	29	16	3	—	61	181	158	12	5	7	37	43	Won in conference quarterfinals, 4–3 (Capitals); Lost in conference semifinals, 1–4 (Devils)
1995–96	1995–96	Eastern	Northeast↑	1st	82	49	29	4	—	102	362	284	18	11	7	57	52	Won in conference quarterfinals, 4–2 (Capitals); Won in conference semifinals, 4–1 (Rangers); Lost in conference finals, 3–4 (Panthers)
1996–97	1996–97	Eastern	Northeast	2nd	82	38	36	8	—	84	285	280	5	1	4	13	20	Lost in conference quarterfinals, 1–4 (Flyers)
1997–98	1997–98	Eastern	Northeast↑	1st	82	40	24	18	—	98	228	188	6	2	4	15	18	Lost in conference quarterfinals, 2–4 (Canadiens)
1998–99	1998–99	Eastern	Atlantic	3rd	82	38	30	14	—	90	242	225	13	6	7	35	36	Won in conference quarterfinals, 4–3 (Devils); Lost in conference semifinals, 2–4 (Maple Leafs)
1999–2000^{[e]}	1999–2000	Eastern	Atlantic	3rd	82	37	31	8	6	88	241	236	11	6	5	31	23	Won in conference quarterfinals, 4–1 (Capitals); Lost in conference semifinals, 2–4 (Flyers)
2000–01	2000–01	Eastern	Atlantic	3rd	82	42	28	9	3	96	281	256	18	9	9	38	44	Won in conference quarterfinals, 4–2 (Capitals); Won in conference semifinals, 4–3 (Sabres); Lost in conference finals, 1–4 (Devils)
2001–02	2001–02	Eastern	Atlantic	5th	82	28	41	8	5	69	198	249	—	—	—	—	—	Did not qualify
2002–03	2002–03	Eastern	Atlantic	5th	82	27	44	6	5	65	189	255	—	—	—	—	—	Did not qualify
2003–04	2003–04	Eastern	Atlantic	5th	82	23	47	8	4	58	190	303	—	—	—	—	—	Did not qualify
2004–05^{[f]}	2004–05	Season not played due to lockout																
2005–06^{[g]}	2005–06	Eastern	Atlantic	5th	82	22	46	—	14	58	244	316	—	—	—	—	—	Did not qualify
2006–07	2006–07	Eastern	Atlantic	2nd	82	47	24	—	11	105	277	246	5	1	4	10	18	Lost in conference quarterfinals, 1–4 (Senators)
2007–08	2007–08	Eastern‡	Atlantic↑	1st	82	47	27	—	8	102	247	216	20	14	6	61	43	Won in conference quarterfinals, 4–0 (Senators); Won in conference semifinals, 4–1 (Rangers); Won in conference finals, 4–1 (Flyers); Lost in Stanley Cup Final, 2–4 (Red Wings)
2008–09	2008-09	Eastern‡	Atlantic	2nd	82	45	28	—	9	99	264	239	24	16	8	79	64	Won in conference quarterfinals, 4–2 (Flyers); Won in conference semifinals, 4–3 (Capitals); Won in conference finals, 4–0 (Hurricanes); Won in Stanley Cup Final, 4–3 (Red Wings)†
2009–10	2009–10	Eastern	Atlantic	2nd	82	47	28	—	7	101	257	237	13	7	6	42	38	Won in conference quarterfinals, 4–2 (Senators); Lost in conference semifinals, 3–4 (Canadiens)
2010–11	2010–11	Eastern	Atlantic	2nd	82	49	25	—	8	106	238	199	7	3	4	14	22	Lost in conference quarterfinals, 3–4 (Lightning)
2011–12	2011–12	Eastern	Atlantic	2nd	82	51	25	—	6	108	282	221	6	2	4	26	30	Lost in conference quarterfinals, 2–4 (Flyers)
2012–13^{[h]}	2012–13	Eastern	Atlantic↑	1st	48	36	12	—	0	72	165	119	15	8	7	49	40	Won in conference quarterfinals, 4–2 (Islanders); Won in conference semifinals, 4–1 (Senators); Lost in conference finals, 0–4 (Bruins)
2013–14	2013–14	Eastern	Metropolitan↑	1st	82	51	24	—	7	109	249	207	13	7	6	35	33	Won in first round, 4–2 (Blue Jackets); Lost in second round, 3–4 (Rangers)
2014–15	2014–15	Eastern	Metropolitan	4th	82	43	27	—	12	98	221	210	5	1	4	8	11	Lost in first round, 1–4 (Rangers)
2015–16	2015–16	Eastern‡	Metropolitan	2nd	82	48	26	—	8	104	245	203	24	16	8	73	55	Won in first round, 4–1 (Rangers); Won in second round, 4–2 (Capitals); Won in conference finals, 4–3 (Lightning); Won in Stanley Cup Final, 4–2 (Sharks)†
2016–17	2016–17	Eastern‡	Metropolitan	2nd	82	50	21	—	11	111	282	234	25	16	9	77	57	Won in first round, 4–1 (Blue Jackets); Won in second round, 4–3 (Capitals); Won in conference finals, 4–3 (Senators); Won in Stanley Cup Final, 4–2 (Predators)†
2017–18	2017–18	Eastern	Metropolitan	2nd	82	47	29	—	6	100	272	250	12	6	6	42	34	Won in first round, 4–2 (Flyers); Lost second round, 2–4 (Capitals)
2018–19	2018–19	Eastern	Metropolitan	3rd	82	44	26	—	12	100	273	241	4	0	4	6	14	Lost in first round, 0–4 (Islanders)
2019–20^{[i]}	2019–20	Eastern	Metropolitan	3rd	69	40	23	—	6	86	224	196	4	1	3	8	10	Lost in qualifying round, 1–3 (Canadiens)
2020–21^{[j]}	2020–21	—	East↑	1st	56	37	16	—	3	77	196	156	6	2	4	16	21	Lost in first round, 2–4 (Islanders)
2021–22	2021–22	Eastern	Metropolitan	3rd	82	46	25	—	11	103	272	229	7	3	4	29	28	Lost in first round, 3–4 (Rangers)
2022–23	2022–23	Eastern	Metropolitan	5th	82	40	31	—	11	91	262	264	—	—	—	—	—	Did not qualify
2023–24	2023–24	Eastern	Metropolitan	5th	82	38	32	—	12	88	255	251	—	—	—	—	—	Did not qualify
2024–25	2024–25	Eastern	Metropolitan	7th	82	34	36	—	12	80	243	293	—	—	—	—	—	Did not qualify
2025–26	2025–26	Eastern	Metropolitan	2nd	82	41	25	—	16	98	293	268	6	2	4	11	16	Lost in first round, 2–4 (Flyers)
Totals					4,581	2,102	1,883	383	213	4,800	15,199	15,354	404	214	190	1,231	1,175	38 playoff appearances

== All-time records ==
Statistic	GP	W	L	T	OT
Regular season record (1967–present)	4,581	2,102	1,883	383	213
Postseason record (1967–present)	404	214	190	—	—
All-time regular and postseason record	4,985	2,316	2,073	383	213
All-time series record: 40–33

Statistics above are correct as of the end of the 2025–26 season.

== Footnotes ==
- ^{a} The NHL realigned before the 1974–75 season. The Penguins were placed in the Prince of Wales Conference's Norris Division.
- ^{b} Before the 1981–82 season, the NHL moved the Patrick Division to the Prince of Wales Conference.
- ^{c} The NHL realigned into Eastern and Western conferences prior to the 1993–94 season. Pittsburgh was placed in the Northeast Division of the Eastern Conference.
- ^{d} The season was shortened to 48 games because of the 1994–95 NHL lockout.
- ^{e} Beginning with the 1999–2000 season, teams received one point for losing a regular-season game in overtime.
- ^{f} The season was cancelled because of the 2004–05 NHL lockout.
- ^{g} Before the 2005–06 season, the NHL instituted a penalty shootout for regular-season games that remained tied after a five-minute overtime period, which prevented ties.
- ^{h} The season was shortened to 48 games because of the 2012–13 NHL lockout
- ^{i} The regular season was suspended on March 12, 2020 because of the COVID-19 pandemic. Eventually, the season resumed with the postseason in an expanded 24-team format on August 1, 2020.
- ^{j} Due to the COVID-19 pandemic, the 2020–21 NHL season was shortened to 56 games.
