= List of Atlanta Thrashers seasons =

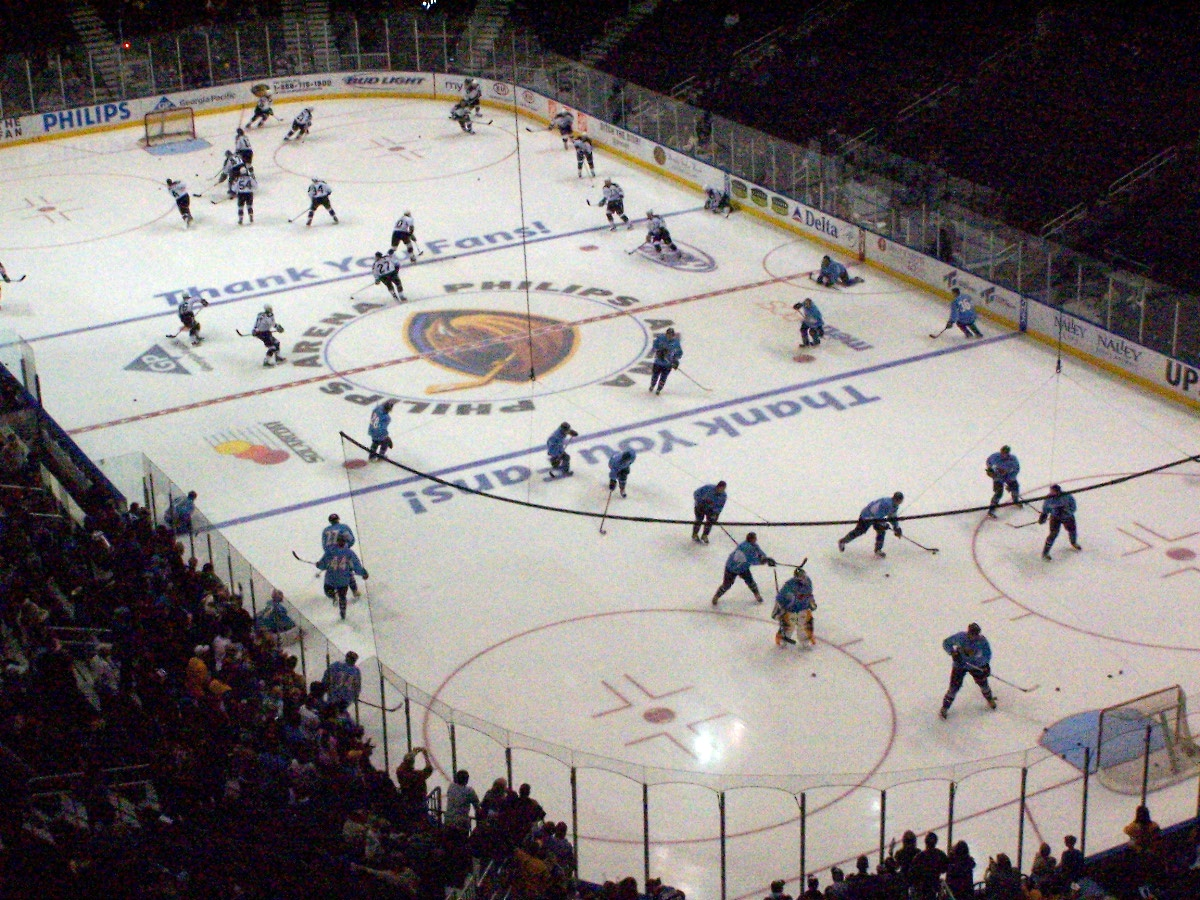
Philips Arena prior to a game.

The Atlanta Thrashers were a professional ice hockey team based in Atlanta. They competed in the National Hockey League (NHL) as a member of the Southeast Division of the Eastern Conference before moving to Winnipeg to become the Winnipeg Jets. From their inaugural season in 1999 until 2011, the team played its home games at Philips Arena. In eleven completed seasons, the team won one division championship and had qualified for the playoffs only once, both occurring in 2006–07.

== Table key ==
Key of colors and symbols
Color/symbol	Explanation
†	Stanley Cup champions
‡	Conference champions
↑	Division champions
#	Led league in points

Key of terms and abbreviations
Term or abbreviation	Definition
Finish	Final position in division or league standings
GP	Number of games played
W	Number of wins
L	Number of losses
T	Number of ties
OT	Number of losses in overtime (since the 1999–2000 season)
Pts	Number of points
GF	Goals for (goals scored by the Thrashers)
GA	Goals against (goals scored by the Thrashers' opponents)
—	Does not apply

== Season-by-season history ==
Season	Team	Conference	Division	Regular season									Postseason					
Season	Team	Conference	Division	Finish	GP	W	L	T	OTL	Pts	GF	GA	GP	W	L	GF	GA	Result
1999–2000	1999–2000	Eastern	Southeast	5th	82	14	57	7	4^{[a]}	39	170	313	—	—	—	—	—	Did not qualify
2000–01	2000–01	Eastern	Southeast	4th	82	23	45	12	2	60	211	289	—	—	—	—	—	Did not qualify
2001–02	2001–02	Eastern	Southeast	5th	82	19	47	11	5	54	187	288	—	—	—	—	—	Did not qualify
2002–03	2002–03	Eastern	Southeast	3rd	82	31	39	7	5	74	226	284	—	—	—	—	—	Did not qualify
2003–04	2003–04	Eastern	Southeast	2nd	82	33	37	8	4	78	214	243	—	—	—	—	—	Did not qualify
2004–05	2004–05	Eastern	Southeast	Season not played due to lockout														
2005–06	2005–06	Eastern	Southeast	3rd	82	41	33	—^{[b]}	8	90	281	275	—	—	—	—	—	Did not qualify
2006–07	2006–07	Eastern	Southeast ↑	1st	82	43	28	—	11	97	246	245	4	0	4	6	17	Lost in conference quarterfinals, 0–4 (Rangers)
2007–08	2007–08	Eastern	Southeast	4th	82	34	40	—	8	76	216	272	—	—	—	—	—	Did not qualify
2008–09	2008–09	Eastern	Southeast	4th	82	35	41	—	6	76	257	280	—	—	—	—	—	Did not qualify
2009–10	2009–10	Eastern	Southeast	2nd	82	35	34	—	13	83	234	256	—	—	—	—	—	Did not qualify
2010–11	2010–11	Eastern	Southeast	4th	82	34	36	—	12	80	223	269	—	—	—	—	—	Did not qualify
Relocated to Winnipeg
Totals					902	342	437	45	78	807	2,465	3,014	4	0	4	6	17	

== See also ==
- List of NHL seasons
- List of Atlanta Flames seasons

== Notes ==
- ^{a} Beginning with the 1999–2000 season, teams received one point for losing a regular season game in overtime.
- ^{b} Before the 2005–06 season, the NHL instituted a penalty shootout for regular season games that remained tied after a five-minute overtime period, which prevented ties.
