= 1982–83 Calgary Flames season =

NHL team season

1982–83 Calgary Flames
- Division: 2nd Smythe
- Conference: 4th Campbell
- 1982–83 record: 32–34–14
- Home record: 21–12–7
- Road record: 11–22–7
- Goals for: 321
- Goals against: 317

Team information
- General manager: Cliff Fletcher
- Coach: Bob Johnson
- Captain: Phil Russell
- Alternate captains: None
- Arena: Stampede Corral
- Average attendance: 7,242

Team leaders
- Goals: Lanny McDonald (66)
- Assists: Guy Chouinard (59)
- Points: Kent Nilsson (104)
- Penalty minutes: Doug Risebrough (138)
- Wins: Rejean Lemelin and Don Edwards (16)
- Goals against average: Rejean Lemelin (3.61)

The 1982–83 Calgary Flames season was the third season in Calgary and 11th for the Flames franchise in the National Hockey League (NHL). Despite finishing the season below .500, the Flames had their best ever finish in the division standings, placing second in the Smythe Division. In the playoffs, Calgary was able to avenge the previous season's defeat at the hands of the Vancouver Canucks by knocking off Vancouver in four games. In the second round, the Flames met up with their provincial rivals, the Edmonton Oilers, for the first time. The series would not be close, as Edmonton powered past Calgary in five games, including humiliating 10–2 and 9–1 victories over the Flames.

"Badger" Bob Johnson replaced Al MacNeil as the team's head coach prior to the season. Johnson would go on to coach 400 games with the Flames, and win 193 games in five seasons, both of which remain Flames records. Johnson would later gain election into the Hockey Hall of Fame in 1992.

Lanny McDonald, in his first full season in Calgary, had a career year, battling Wayne Gretzky for the scoring lead all season long. McDonald finished the season five goals behind Gretzky, but his mark of 66 remains a Flames record. McDonald was the Flames representative at the 1983 All-Star Game, and was awarded the Bill Masterton Trophy for perseverance, sportsmanship, and dedication to the game.

== Regular season ==
=== Season standings ===
Smythe Division
	GP	W	L	T	GF	GA	Pts
**Edmonton Oilers**	80	47	21	12	424	315	106
**Calgary Flames**	80	32	34	14	321	316	78
**Vancouver Canucks**	80	30	35	15	303	309	75
**Winnipeg Jets**	80	33	39	8	311	333	74
Los Angeles Kings	80	27	41	12	308	365	66

Note: GP = Games played, W = Wins, L = Losses, T = Ties, Pts = Points, GF = Goals for, GA = Goals against
Note: Teams that qualified for the playoffs are highlighted in bold.

=== Record vs. opponents ===
Smythe Division record vs. opponents

==== Vs. Campbell Conference ====
**Vs. Smythe Division**

1982–83 NHL records
Team	**CGY**	**EDM**	**LAK**	**VAN**	**WIN**	**Total**
Calgary	—	2−4−2	3−3−2	5−2−1	5−2−1	**15−11−6**
Edmonton	4−2−2	—	5−1−2	5−2−1	6−2	**20−7−5**
Los Angeles	3−3−2	1−5−2	—	3−3−2	2−6	**9−17−6**
Vancouver	2−5−1	2−5−1	3−3−2	—	4−3−1	**11−16−5**
Winnipeg	2−5−1	2−6	6−2	3−4−1	—	**13−17−2**

**Vs. Norris Division**

1982–83 NHL records
Team	**CHI**	**DET**	**MIN**	**STL**	**TOR**	**Total**
Calgary	2−1	2−1	1−1−1	2−1	1−1−1	**8−5−2**
Edmonton	1−1−1	2−1	2−1	2−0−1	2−0−1	**9−3−3**
Los Angeles	0−2−1	1−0−2	1−2	1−2	2−1	**5−7−3**
Vancouver	1−0−2	1−1−1	0−2−1	3−0	1−2	**6−5−4**
Winnipeg	1−2	3−0	0−3	2−1	3−0	**9−6−0**

**Vs. Wales Conference**

**Vs. Adams Division**

1982–83 NHL records
Team	**BOS**	**BUF**	**HFD**	**MTL**	**QUE**	**Total**
Calgary	0−2−1	1−2	1−0−2	1−2	0−2−1	**3−8−4**
Edmonton	0−2−1	2−1	2−0−1	2−1	1−1−1	**7−5−3**
Los Angeles	2−1	1−2	2−1	1−2	1−1−1	**7−7−1**
Vancouver	1−2	1−1−1	2−1	0−3	3−0	**7−7−1**
Winnipeg	2−0−1	1−2	1−1−1	0−3	1−2	**5−8−2**

**Vs. Patrick Division**

1982–83 NHL records
Team	**NJD**	**NYI**	**NYR**	**PHI**	**PIT**	**WSH**	**Total**
Calgary	2−1	0−2−1	0−2−1	0−3	3−0	1−2	**6−10−2**
Edmonton	3−0	0−3	3−0	1−2	2−1	2−0−1	**11−6−1**
Los Angeles	2−1	0−3	1−1−1	1−2	1−2	1−1−1	**6−10−2**
Vancouver	0−1−2	1−2	1−1–1	1−1−1	2−1	1−1−1	**6−7−5**
Winnipeg	2−1	1−1−1	1−1−1	0−3	2−1	0−1−2	**6−8−4**

== Schedule and results ==
1982–83 regular season
October: 4–7–2 (home: 3–2–0; road: 1–5–2)

Game	Date	Visitor	Score	Home	OT	Record	Pts
1	October 5	Calgary	5 – 7	Edmonton		0–1–0	0
2	October 7	NY Islanders	5 – 4	Calgary		0–2–0	0
3	October 9	Calgary	1 – 3	Los Angeles		0–3–0	0
4	October 12	Edmonton	4 – 9	Calgary		1–3–0	2
5	October 14	Detroit	4 – 6	Calgary		2–3–0	4
6	October 16	Calgary	4 – 8	Minnesota		2–4–0	4
7	October 17	Calgary	5 – 5	Winnipeg	OT	2–4–1	5
8	October 19	Boston	3 – 1	Calgary		2–5–1	5
9	October 21	Hartford	3 – 10	Calgary		3–5–1	7
10	October 23	Calgary	5 – 5	Toronto	OT	3–5–2	8
11	October 26	Calgary	2 – 7	NY Islanders		3–6–2	8
12	October 27	Calgary	4 – 7	NY Rangers		3–7–2	8
13	October 30	Calgary	4 – 1	Pittsburgh		4–7–2	10

November: 5–6–3 (home: 3–2–1; road: 2–4–2)

Game	Date	Visitor	Score	Home	OT	Record	Pts
14	November 1	Calgary	6 – 3	New Jersey		5–7–2	12
15	November 4	Winnipeg	5 – 7	Calgary		6–7–2	14
16	November 6	NY Rangers	2 – 2	Calgary	OT	6–7–3	15
17	November 7	Calgary	2 – 5	Winnipeg		6–8–3	15
18	November 9	Los Angeles	4 – 5	Calgary		7–8–3	17
19	November 13	Calgary	3 – 1	Pittsburgh		8–8–3	19
20	November 16	Calgary	3 – 5	Washington		8–9–3	19
21	November 18	Calgary	2 – 3	Philadelphia		8–10–3	19
22	November 20	Calgary	4 – 4	Hartford	OT	8–10–4	20
23	November 21	Calgary	1 – 2	Boston		8–11–4	20
24	November 23	Washington	3 – 6	Calgary		9–11–4	22
25	November 25	Quebec	3 – 2	Calgary		9–12–4	22
26	November 27	New Jersey	4 – 3	Calgary		9–13–4	22
27	November 29	Calgary	3 – 3	Minnesota	OT	9–13–5	23

December: 5–7–2 (home: 2–4–2; road: 3–3–0)

Game	Date	Visitor	Score	Home	OT	Record	Pts
28	December 1	Calgary	1 – 4	Los Angeles		9–14–5	23
29	December 3	Calgary	5 – 4	Vancouver		10–14–5	25
30	December 4	Calgary	5 – 7	Edmonton		10–15–5	25
31	December 7	Los Angeles	4 – 4	Calgary	OT	10–15–6	26
32	December 9	St. Louis	7 – 2	Calgary		10–16–6	26
33	December 10	Calgary	6 – 4	Winnipeg		11–16–6	28
34	December 12	Calgary	3 – 7	Detroit		11–17–6	28
35	December 16	Vancouver	3 – 2	Calgary		11–18–6	28
36	December 18	Montreal	5 – 4	Calgary		11–19–6	28
37	December 21	Minnesota	4 – 6	Calgary		12–19–6	30
38	December 23	Calgary	6 – 3	Vancouver		13–19–6	32
39	December 26	Edmonton	4 – 4	Calgary	OT	13–19–7	33
40	December 28	Chicago	2 – 3	Calgary		14–19–7	35
41	December 30	Philadelphia	6 – 3	Calgary		14–20–7	35

January: 7–5–0 (home: 4–1–0; road: 2–4–0)

Game	Date	Visitor	Score	Home	OT	Record	Pts
42	January 4	Edmonton	6 – 3	Calgary		14–21–7	35
43	January 6	Winnipeg	1 – 5	Calgary		15–21–7	37
44	January 8	Detroit	2 – 5	Calgary		16–21–7	39
45	January 12	Calgary	6 – 4	Vancouver		17–21–7	41
46	January 13	Vancouver	2 – 5	Calgary		18–21–7	43
47	January 15	Calgary	2 – 7	Quebec		18–22–7	43
48	January 18	Calgary	2 – 7	Montreal		18–23–7	43
49	January 20	Calgary	2 – 5	Philadelphia		18–24–7	43
50	January 22	Calgary	7 – 6	St. Louis		19–24–7	45
51	January 25	Calgary	8 – 6	Los Angeles		20–24–7	47
52	January 27	Toronto	1 – 3	Calgary		21–24–7	49
53	January 29	Calgary	4 – 5	Edmonton		21–25–7	49

February: 5–5–2 (home: 5–1–2; road: 0–4–0)

Game	Date	Visitor	Score	Home	OT	Record	Pts
54	February 1	NY Islanders	2 – 2	Calgary	OT	21–25–8	50
55	February 3	Montreal	3 – 7	Calgary		22–25–8	52
56	February 5	Pittsburgh	4 – 7	Calgary		23–25–8	54
57	February 10	Quebec	3 – 3	Calgary	OT	23–25–9	55
58	February 12	Buffalo	2 – 4	Calgary		24–25–9	57
59	February 16	Calgary	3 – 5	Chicago		24–26–9	57
60	February 18	Calgary	1 – 5	Buffalo		24–27–9	57
61	February 19	Calgary	3 – 5	Toronto		24–28–9	57
62	February 22	Edmonton	1 – 4	Calgary		25–28–9	59
63	February 24	Washington	4 – 2	Calgary		25–29–9	59
64	February 26	St. Louis	2 – 7	Calgary		26–29–9	61
65	February 27	Calgary	2 – 6	Vancouver		26–30–9	61

March: 6–4–4 (home: 4–2–2; road: 2–2–2)

Game	Date	Visitor	Score	Home	OT	Record	Pts
66	March 1	Vancouver	1 – 8	Calgary		27–30–9	63
67	March 5	Los Angeles	4 – 4	Calgary	OT	27–30–10	64
68	March 8	Calgary	4 – 6	Los Angeles		27–31–10	64
69	March 10	Winnipeg	3 – 6	Calgary		28–31–10	66
70	March 12	NY Rangers	4 – 1	Calgary		28–32–10	66
71	March 14	Calgary	7 – 0	New Jersey		29–32–10	68
72	March 16	Calgary	3 – 5	Buffalo		29–33–10	68
73	March 19	Calgary	2 – 2	Boston	OT	29–33–11	69
74	March 20	Calgary	2 – 2	Hartford	OT	29–33–12	70
75	March 24	Chicago	5 – 6	Calgary		30–33–12	72
76	March 26	Winnipeg	5 – 2	Calgary		30–34–12	72
77	March 27	Calgary	4 – 3	Winnipeg		31–34–12	74
78	March 29	Los Angeles	3 – 5	Calgary		32–24–12	76
79	March 31	Vancouver	4 – 4	Calgary	OT	32–24–13	77

April: 0–0–1 (home: 0–0–0; road: 0–0–1)

Game	Date	Visitor	Score	Home	OT	Record	Pts
80	April 3	Calgary	3 – 3	Edmonton	OT	32–34–14	78

Legend: Win (2 points) Loss (0 points) Tie (1 point)

== Playoffs ==
1983 Stanley Cup playoffs
Smythe Division Semifinals vs. Vancouver Canucks – Flames win 3–1

Game	Date	Visitor	Score	Home	OT	Series
1	April 6	Vancouver	3 – 4	Calgary	OT	Calgary leads 1–0
2	April 7	Vancouver	3 – 5	Calgary		Calgary leads 2–0
3	April 9	Calgary	4 – 5	Vancouver		Calgary leads 2–1
4	April 10	Calgary	4 – 3	Vancouver	OT	Calgary wins 3–1

Smythe Division Finals vs. Edmonton Oilers – Oilers win 4–1

Game	Date	Visitor	Score	Home	OT	Series
1	April 14	Calgary	3 – 6	Edmonton		Edmonton leads 1–0
2	April 15	Calgary	1 – 5	Edmonton		Edmonton leads 2–0
3	April 17	Edmonton	10 – 2	Calgary		Edmonton leads 3–0
4	April 18	Edmonton	5 – 6	Calgary		Edmonton leads 3–1
5	April 20	Calgary	1 – 9	Edmonton		Edmonton wins 4–1

Legend: Win Loss

== Player statistics ==
=== Skaters ===
Note: GP = Games played; G = Goals; A = Assists; Pts = Points; PIM = Penalty minutes

		Regular season					Playoffs
Player	#	GP	G	A	Pts	PIM	GP	G	A	Pts	PIM
Kent Nilsson	14	80	46	58	104	10	9	1	11	12	2
Lanny McDonald	9	80	**66**	32	98	90	7	3	4	7	19
Paul Reinhart	23	78	17	58	75	28	9	6	3	9	2
Guy Chouinard	7	80	13	59	72	18	9	1	6	7	4
Doug Risebrough	8	71	21	37	58	138	9	1	3	4	18
Mel Bridgman	26	79	19	31	50	103	9	3	4	7	33
Kari Eloranta	20	80	4	40	44	43	9	1	3	4	17
Jim Peplinski	24	80	15	26	41	134	8	1	1	2	45
Kevin LaVallee	15	60	19	16	35	17	8	1	3	4	4
Jamie Hislop	17	79	14	19	33	17	9	0	2	2	6
Phil Russell	5	78	13	18	31	112	9	1	4	5	24
Eddy Beers	27	41	11	15	26	21	8	1	1	2	27
Dave Hindmarch	18	60	11	12	23	23	4	0	0	0	4
Jim Jackson	16	48	8	12	20	7	8	2	1	3	2
Steve Christoff	11	45	9	8	17	4	1	0	0	0	0
Richie Dunn	6	80	3	11	14	47	9	1	1	2	8
Carl Mokosak	10	41	7	6	13	87	–	–	–	–	-
Kari Jalonen	21	25	9	3	12	4	5	1	0	1	0
Greg Meredith	25	35	5	4	9	8	5	3	1	4	4
Charlie Bourgeois	2	15	2	3	5	21	–	–	–	–	-
Jamie Macoun	34	22	1	4	5	25	9	0	2	2	8
Rejean Lemelin	31	39	0	5	5	7	7	0	0	0	0
Al MacInnis	22	14	1	3	4	9	–	–	–	–	-
Pierre Rioux	32	14	1	2	3	4	–	–	–	–	-
Denis Cyr^{‡}	12	11	1	1	2	0	–	–	–	–	-
Tim Hunter	19	16	1	0	1	54	9	1	0	1	70
Pat Ribble	28	28	0	1	1	18	–	–	–	–	-
Don Edwards	1	39	0	1	1	0	5	0	0	0	0
Mike Vernon	30	2	0	0	0	0	–	–	–	–	-
Howard Walker	12	3	0	0	0	7	–	–	–	–	-
Tim Harrer	12	3	0	0	0	2	–	–	–	–	-
Gord Hampson	27	4	0	0	0	5	–	–	–	–	-
Tim Bernhardt	29	6	0	0	0	0	–	–	–	–	-

^{†}Denotes player spent time with another team before joining Calgary. Stats reflect time with the Flames only.
^{‡}Traded mid-season.
Bold denotes franchise record.

=== Goaltenders ===
Note: GP = Games played; TOI = Time on ice (minutes); W = Wins; L = Losses; OT = Overtime/shootout losses; GA = Goals against; SO = Shutouts; GAA = Goals against average

		Regular season								Playoffs
Player	#	GP	TOI	W	L	T	GA	SO	GAA	GP	TOI	W	L	GA	SO	GAA
Rejean Lemelin	31	39	2211	16	12	8	133	0	3.61	7	327	3	3	27	0	4.95
Don Edwards	1	39	1109	16	15	6	148	1	4.02	5	226	1	2	22	0	5.84
Tim Bernhardt	29	6	280	0	5	0	21	0	4.50	–	–	–	–	–	–	-.--
Mike Vernon	30	2	100	0	2	0	11	0	6.60	–	–	–	–	–	–	-.--

== Transactions ==
The Flames were involved in the following transactions during the 1982–83 season.

=== Trades ===
May 29, 1982	To Calgary Flames Richie Dunn; Don Edwards; 2nd round pick in 1982 entry draft (Richard Kromm); 1st round pick in 1983 entry draft (Dan Quinn)	To Buffalo Sabres 1st round pick in 1982 entry draft (Paul Cyr); 2nd round pick in 1982 entry draft (Jens Johansson); 1st round pick in 1983 entry draft (Normand Lacombe); 2nd round pick in 1983 entry draft (John Tucker)
June 2, 1982	To Calgary Flames Kari Eloranta	To St. Louis Blues Future Considerations
June 7, 1982	To Calgary Flames Steve Christoff; Bill Nyrop; 2nd round pick in 1982 entry draft (Dave Reierson)	To Minnesota North Stars Willi Plett; 4th round pick in 1983 entry draft (Dusan Pasek)
June 7, 1982	To Calgary Flames Howard Walker; George White; 6th round pick in 1982 entry draft (Mats Kihlstrom); 3rd round pick in 1983 entry draft (Perry Berezan); 4th round pick in 1984 entry draft (Paul Ranheim)	To Washington Capitals Ken Houston; Pat Riggin
September 11, 1982	To Calgary Flames Doug Risebrough; 2nd round pick in 1983 entry draft (traded to Minnesota North Stars; North Stars selected Frank Musil)	To Montreal Canadiens Washington Capitals' 2nd round pick in 1983 entry draft (Todd Francis); 3rd round pick in 1984 entry draft (Graeme Bonar)
November 8, 1982	To Calgary Flames rights to Carey Wilson	To Chicago Black Hawks Denis Cyr
December 2, 1982	To Calgary Flames Yves Courteau	To Detroit Red Wings Bob Francis

=== Free agents ===
Player	Former team
G Marc D'Amour	Sault Ste. Marie Greyhounds (OHL)
RW Pierre Rioux	Shawinigan Cataractes (QMJHL)
LW Dan Bolduc	Montreal Canadiens
D Tony Stiles	Michigan Tech (NCAA)
LW Jim Jackson	Muskegon Mohawks (IHL)
D Jamie Macoun	Ohio State University (NCAA)
W Colin Patterson	Clarkson College (NCAA)

Player	New team
LW Dan Labraaten	Leksands IF (Elitserien)
D Pekka Rautakallio	HIFK (SM-liiga)
LW Gary McAdam	Buffalo Sabres

== Draft picks ==
Calgary's picks at the 1982 NHL entry draft, held in Montreal.

Rnd	Pick	Player	Nationality	Position	Team (league)	NHL statistics				
Rnd	Pick	Player	Nationality	Position	Team (league)	GP	G	A	Pts	PIM
2	29	Dave Reierson	Canada	D	Prince Albert Raiders (SJHL)	2	0	0	0	0
2	37	Richard Kromm	Canada	LW	Portland Winter Hawks (WHL)	372	70	103	173	138
3	51	Jim Laing	United States	D	Clarkson University (ECAC)					
4	65	Dave Meszaros	Canada	G	Toronto Marlboros (OHL)					
4	72	Mark Lamb	Canada	C	Billings Bighorns (WHL)	403	46	100	146	291
5	93	Lou Kiriakou	Canada	D	Toronto Marlboros (OHL)					
6	114	Jeff Vaive	Canada	C	Ottawa 67's (OHL)					
6	118	Mats Kihlstrom	Sweden	D	N/A					
7	135	Brad Ramsden	Canada	C	Peterborough Petes (OHL)					
8	156	Roy Myllari	Canada	D	Cornwall Royals (OHL)					
9	177	Ted Pearson	Canada	F	University of Wisconsin–Madison (WCHA)					
10	198	Jim Uens	Canada	C	Oshawa Generals (OHL)					
11	219	Rick Erdall	United States	C	University of Minnesota (WCHA)					
12	240	Dale Thompson	Canada	RW	Calgary Wranglers (WHL)					

== See also ==
- 1982–83 NHL season
