= List of Winnipeg Jets seasons =

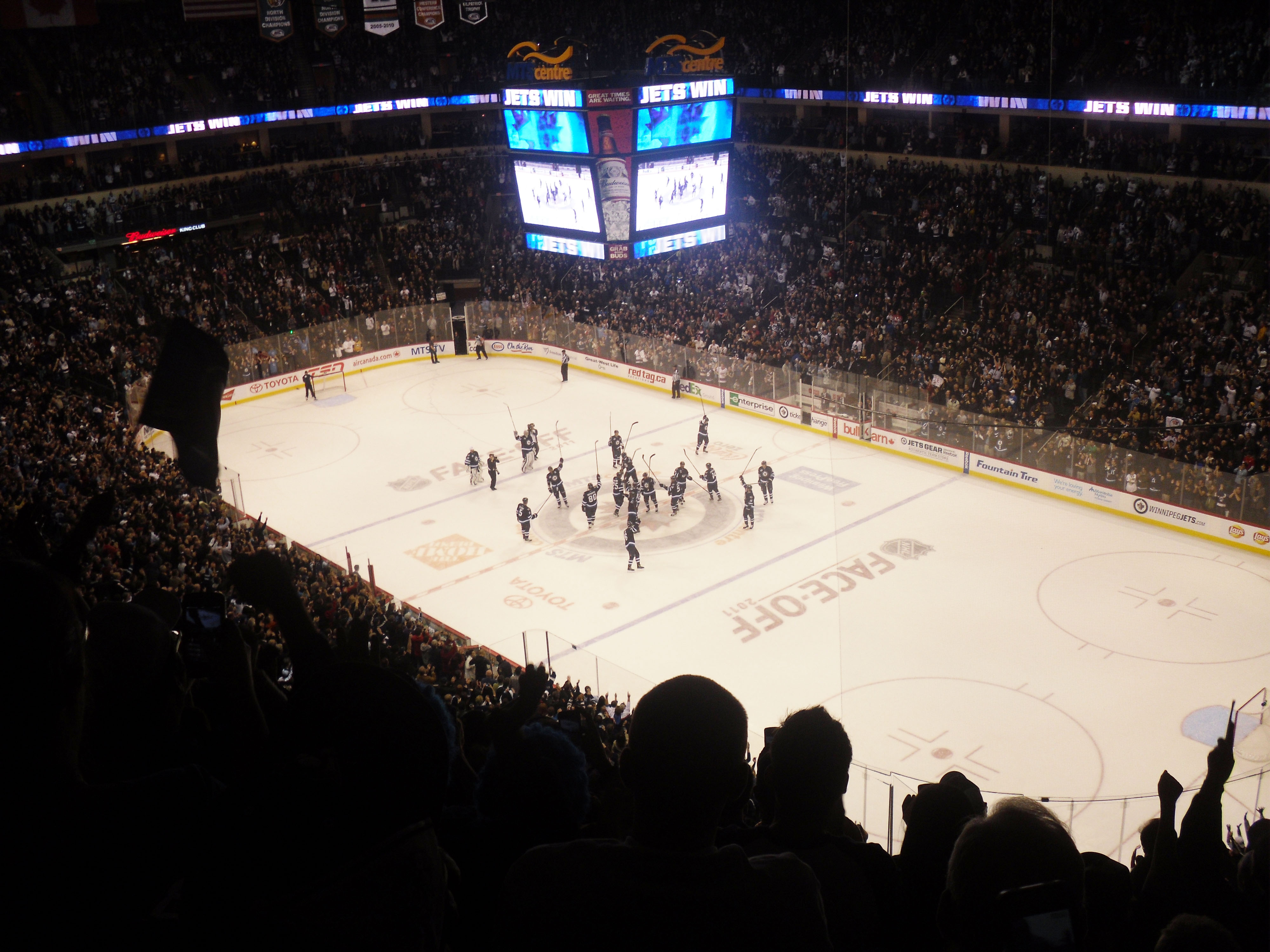
The Jets celebrate their first regulation win in Winnipeg at the MTS Centre on October 17, 2011.

The Winnipeg Jets are a professional ice hockey team based in Winnipeg. They are members of the Central Division of the Western Conference of the National Hockey League (NHL). The team, owned by True North Sports & Entertainment, plays its home games at the Canada Life Centre.

The franchise was founded in 1972 as a World Hockey Association franchise, and played until 1996 when its hockey operations relocated to Phoenix as the Coyotes. The original Jets made the playoffs six times, made five Avco Cup Finals and won three Avco Cups while in the WHA. In the NHL, the original Jets made the playoffs 11 times but advanced past the first round only twice.

An expansion franchise joined the NHL as the Atlanta Thrashers in 1999, and played there for twelve seasons before moving to Winnipeg in 2011 as the new incarnation of the Jets. The team struggled to make the playoffs as they qualified for the playoffs just once (in 2015) in their first six seasons. In the franchise's time in Winnipeg they have qualified for the playoffs eight times and have advanced to one conference finals in 2018. The 2024-25 team saw them win their first ever Central Division title, and also won the Presidents' Trophy for the best overall record in the league.

== Table key ==
Key of colors and symbols
Color/symbol	Explanation
†	Stanley Cup champions
‡	Conference champions
↑	Division champions
#	Led league in points

Key of terms and abbreviations
Term or abbreviation	Definition
Finish	Final position in division or league standings
GP	Number of games played
W	Number of wins
L	Number of losses
OT	Number of losses in overtime (since the 1999–2000 season)
Pts	Number of points
GF	Goals for (goals scored by the Jets)
GA	Goals against (goals scored by the Jets' opponents)
—	Does not apply

== Year by year ==
=== WHA era ===
Season	Team season	Division	Regular season								Postseason					
Season	Team season	Division	Finish	GP	W	L	T	Pts	GF	GA	GP	W	L	GF	GA	Result
1972–73	1972–73	Western	1st	78	43	31	4	90	285	249	14	9	5	55	49	Won quarterfinals, 4–1 (Fighting Saints); Won semifinals, 4–0 (Aeros); Lost Avco Cup Finals, 1–4 (Whalers)
1973–74	1973–74	Western	4th	78	34	39	5	73	264	296	4	0	4	9	23	Lost quarterfinals, 0–4 (Aeros)
1974–75	1974–75	Canadian	3rd	78	38	35	5	81	322	293	—	—	—	—	—	Did not qualify
1975–76	1975–76	Canadian	1st	81	52	27	2	106	345	254	13	12	1	68	35	Won quarterfinals, 4–0 (Oilers); Won semifinals, 4–1 (Cowboys); Won Avco Cup Finals, 4–0 (Aeros)
1976–77	1976–77	Western	2nd	80	46	32	2	94	366	291	19	11	8	80	73	Won quarterfinals, 4–3 (Mariners); Won semifinals, 4–2 (Aeros); Lost Avco Cup Finals, 3–4 (Nordiques)
1977–78	1977–78	—^{[a]}	1st	80	50	28	2	102	381	270	9	8	1	53	20	Won semifinals, 4–1 (Bulls); Won Avco Cup Finals, 4–0 (Whalers)
1978–79	1978–79	—^{[a]}	3rd	80	39	35	6	84	307	306	10	8	2	51	38	Won semifinals, 4–0 (Nordiques); Won Avco Cup Finals, 4–2 (Oilers)
WHA totals				555	302	227	26	630	2,270	1,958	69	48	21	316	238	6 playoff appearances

=== NHL era ===
NHL Season	Jets season	Conference	Division	Regular season									Postseason					
NHL Season	Jets season	Conference	Division	Finish	GP	W	L	T	OT	Pts	GF	GA	GP	W	L	GF	GA	Result
1979–80	1979–80	Campbell	Smythe	5th	80	20	49	11	-	51	214	314	—	—	—	—	—	Did not qualify
1980–81	1980–81	Campbell	Smythe	5th	80	9	57	14	-	32	246	400	—	—	—	—	—	Did not qualify
1981–82	1981–82	Campbell	Norris	2nd	80	33	33	14	-	80	319	332	4	1	3	13	20	Lost in division semifinals, 1–3 (Blues)
1982–83	1982–83	Campbell	Smythe	4th	80	33	39	8	-	74	311	333	3	0	3	9	14	Lost in division semifinals, 0–3 (Oilers)
1983–84	1983–84	Campbell	Smythe	4th	80	31	38	11	-	73	340	374	3	0	3	7	18	Lost in division semifinals, 0–3 (Oilers)
1984–85	1984–85	Campbell	Smythe	2nd	80	43	27	10	-	96	358	332	8	3	5	26	35	Won in division semifinals, 3–1 (Flames); Lost in division finals, 0–4 (Oilers)
1985–86	1985–86	Campbell	Smythe	3rd	80	26	47	7	-	59	295	372	3	0	3	8	15	Lost in division semifinals, 0–3 (Flames)
1986–87	1986–87	Campbell	Smythe	3rd	80	40	32	8		88	279	310	10	4	6	31	32	Won in division semifinals, 4–2 (Flames); Lost in division finals, 0–4 (Oilers)
1987–88	1987–88	Campbell	Smythe	3rd	80	33	36	11	-	77	292	310	5	1	4	17	25	Lost in division semifinals, 1–4 (Oilers)
1988–89	1988–89	Campbell	Smythe	5th	80	26	42	12	-	64	300	355	—	—	—	—	—	Did not qualify
1989–90	1989–90	Campbell	Smythe	3rd	80	37	32	11	-	85	298	290	7	3	4	22	24	Lost in division semifinals, 3–4 (Oilers)
1990–91	1990–91	Campbell	Smythe	5th	80	26	43	11	-	63	260	288	—	—	—	—	—	Did not qualify
1991–92	1991–92	Campbell	Smythe	4th	80	33	32	15	-	81	251	244	7	3	4	17	29	Lost in division semifinals, 3–4 (Canucks)
1992–93	1992–93	Campbell	Smythe	4th	84	40	37	7	-	87	322	320	6	2	4	17	21	Lost in division semifinals, 2–4 (Canucks)
1993–94	1993–94	Western	Central	6th	84	24	51	9	-	57	245	344	—	—	—	—	—	Did not qualify
1994–95^{[b]}	1994–95	Western	Central	6th	48	16	25	7	-	39	157	177	—	—	—	—	—	Did not qualify
1995–96	1995–96	Western	Central	5th	82	36	40	6	-	78	275	291	6	2	4	10	20	Lost in conference quarterfinals, 2–4 (Red Wings)
Deactivated from 1996 to 1999. The Atlanta Thrashers joined the NHL as an expansion team then relocated to Winnipeg in 2011.
2011–12	2011–12	Eastern	Southeast	4th	82	37	35	-	10	84	225	246	—	—	—	—	—	Did not qualify
2012–13^{[c]}	2012–13	Eastern	Southeast	2nd	48	24	21	-	3	51	128	144	—	—	—	—	—	Did not qualify
2013–14	2013–14	Western^{[d]}	Central	7th	82	37	35	-	10	84	227	237	—	—	—	—	—	Did not qualify
2014–15	2014–15	Western	Central	5th	82	43	26	-	13	99	230	210	4	0	4	9	16	Lost in first round, 0–4 (Ducks)
2015–16	2015–16	Western	Central	7th	82	35	39	-	8	78	211	236	—	—	—	—	—	Did not qualify
2016–17	2016–17	Western	Central	5th	82	40	35	-	7	87	249	256	—	—	—	—	—	Did not qualify
2017–18	2017–18	Western	Central	2nd	82	52	20	-	10	114	277	218	17	9	8	53	42	Won in first round, 4–1 (Wild); Won in second round, 4–3 (Predators); Lost in conference finals, 1–4 (Golden Knights)
2018–19	2018–19	Western	Central	2nd	82	47	30	-	5	99	272	244	6	2	4	16	16	Lost in first round, 2–4 (Blues)
2019–20 ^{[e]}	2019–20	Western	Central	5th	71	37	28	-	6	80	216	203	4	1	3	6	16	Lost in qualifying round, 1–3 (Flames)
2020–21 ^{[f]}	2020–21	—	North	3rd	56	30	23	-	3	63	170	154	8	4	4	20	22	Won in first round, 4–0 (Oilers); Lost in second round, 0–4 (Canadiens)
2021–22	2021–22	Western	Central	6th	82	39	32	-	11	89	252	257	—	—	—	—	—	Did not qualify
2022–23	2022–23	Western	Central	4th	82	46	33	-	3	95	247	225	5	1	4	14	19	Lost in first round, 1–4 (Golden Knights)
2023–24	2023–24	Western	Central	2nd	82	52	24	-	6	110	259	199	5	1	4	15	28	Lost in first round, 1–4 (Avalanche)
2024–25	2024–25	Western	Central↑	1st	82	56	22	-	4	116#	277	191	13	6	7	35	40	Won in first round, 4–3 (Blues); Lost in second round, 2–4 (Stars)
2025–26	2025–26	Western	Central	7th	82	35	35	-	12	82	231	260	—	—	—	—	—	Did not qualify
Totals					2,497	1,116	1,098	172	111	2,515	8,507	8,631	124	43	81	346	454	19 playoff appearances

== Notes ==
- ^{a} Divisions were abolished in 1977–78 and 1978–79 seasons.
- ^{b} The season was shortened to 48 games because of the 1994–95 NHL lockout.
- ^{c} The season was shortened to 48 games because of the 2012–13 NHL lockout.
- ^{d} The NHL realigned prior to the 2013–14 season. The Jets were placed in the Central Division of the Western Conference.
- ^{e} The 2019–20 NHL season was suspended on March 12, 2020, because of the COVID-19 pandemic. The league resumed play on August 1, 2020, for the playoffs with the top 24 teams qualifying.
- ^{f} Due to the COVID-19 pandemic, the 2020–21 NHL season was shortened to 56 games.
