= List of Calgary Flames seasons =

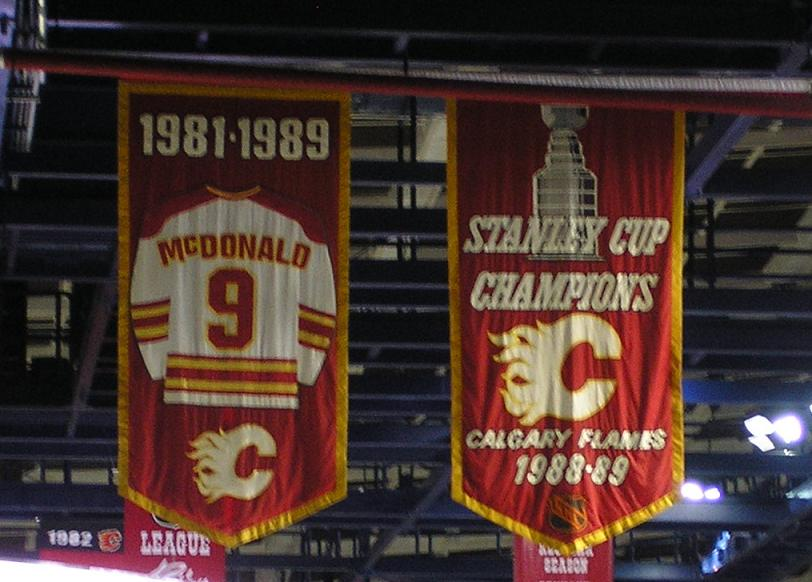
Calgary's 1988–89 Stanley Cup banner.

The Calgary Flames are a professional ice hockey team based in Calgary. The team is a member of the Pacific Division in the Western Conference of the National Hockey League (NHL). The Flames arrived in Calgary in 1980 after transferring from the city of Atlanta, Georgia, where they were known as the Atlanta Flames from their founding in 1972 until relocation. The 2024–25 season is the 45th season of play, and 46th year in Calgary (2004–05 NHL season was not played). It is the 53rd year for the Flames franchise, and including the team's time in Atlanta, the Flames have won over 1,800 regular season games, 12th overall in NHL history.

Calgary played its first season in the Patrick Division before moving to the Smythe when the NHL realigned along geographic lines in 1981. The Flames qualified for the playoffs each year from their arrival in 1980 until 1991. During that time, they won two Presidents' Trophies as the NHL's top regular season club, 1987–88 and 1988–89, captured the Clarence S. Campbell Bowl as Campbell Conference champions twice, 1985–86 and 1988–89, and won the Stanley Cup in 1989. The Flames fared poorly following their Cup win, failing to win another playoff series until 2004, a span of 15 seasons, during which they missed the playoffs eight times. The team returned to the post-season in 2004, making an unlikely trip to the Finals, during which the team captured its third Clarence Campbell Bowl by winning the Western Conference championship by becoming the first team in NHL history to defeat three division winners. Overall, the Flames have made 25 appearances in the Stanley Cup playoffs.

== Table key ==
Key of colors and symbols
| Color/symbol | Explanation |
|---|---|
| † | Stanley Cup champions |
| ‡ | Conference champions |
| ↑ | Division champions |
| # | Led league in points |

Key of terms and abbreviations
| Term or abbreviation | Definition |
|---|---|
| Finish | Final position in division or league standings |
| GP | Number of games played |
| W | Number of wins |
| L | Number of losses |
| T | Number of ties |
| OT | Number of losses in overtime (since the 1999–2000 season) |
| Pts | Number of points |
| GF | Goals for (goals scored by the Flames) |
| GA | Goals against (goals scored by the Flames' opponents) |
| — | Does not apply |

== Year by year ==
| Season | Team | Conference | Division | Regular season | | | | | | | | | Postseason | | | | | |
| Season | Team | Conference | Division | Finish | GP | W | L | T | OT | Pts | GF | GA | GP | W | L | GF | GA | Result |
|---|---|---|---|---|---|---|---|---|---|---|---|---|---|---|---|---|---|---|
Relocated from Atlanta
| 1980–81 | 1980–81 | Campbell | Patrick | 3rd | 80 | 39 | 27 | 14 | — | 92 | 329 | 298 | 16 | 9 | 7 | 55 | 60 | Won in preliminary round, 3–0 (Black Hawks); Won in quarterfinals, 4–3 (Flyers); Lost in semifinals, 2–4 (North Stars) |
| 1981–82 | 1981–82 | Campbell | Smythe | 3rd | 80 | 29 | 34 | 17 | — | 75 | 334 | 345 | 3 | 0 | 3 | 5 | 10 | Lost in division semifinals, 0–3 (Canucks) |
| 1982–83 | 1982–83 | Campbell | Smythe | 2nd | 80 | 32 | 34 | 14 | — | 78 | 321 | 317 | 9 | 4 | 5 | 30 | 49 | Won in division semifinals, 3–1 (Canucks); Lost in division finals, 1–4 (Oilers) |
| 1983–84 | 1983–84 | Campbell | Smythe | 2nd | 80 | 34 | 32 | 14 | — | 82 | 311 | 314 | 11 | 6 | 5 | 41 | 46 | Won in division semifinals, 3–1 (Canucks); Lost in division finals, 3–4 (Oilers) |
| 1984–85 | 1984–85 | Campbell | Smythe | 3rd | 80 | 41 | 27 | 12 | — | 94 | 363 | 302 | 4 | 1 | 3 | 13 | 15 | Lost in division semifinals, 1–3 (Jets) |
| 1985–86 | 1985–86 | Campbell | Smythe | 2nd | 80 | 40 | 31 | 9 | — | 89 | 354 | 315 | 22 | 12 | 10 | 81 | 69 | Won in division semifinals, 3–0 (Jets); Won in division finals, 4–3 (Oilers); Won in conference finals, 4–3 (Blues); Lost in Stanley Cup Final, 1–4 (Canadiens) ‡ |
| 1986–87 | 1986–87 | Campbell | Smythe | 2nd | 80 | 46 | 31 | 3 | — | 95 | 318 | 289 | 6 | 2 | 4 | 15 | 22 | Lost in division semifinals, 2–4 (Jets) |
| 1987–88 | 1987–88 # | Campbell | Smythe ↑ | 1st | 80 | 48 | 23 | 9 | — | 105 | 397 | 305 | 9 | 4 | 5 | 41 | 36 | Won in division semifinals, 4–1 (Kings); Lost in division finals, 0–4 (Oilers) |
| 1988–89 | 1988–89 # | Campbell | Smythe ↑ | 1st | 80 | 54 | 17 | 9 | — | 117 | 354 | 226 | 22 | 16 | 6 | 81 | 55 | Won in division semifinals, 4–3 (Canucks); Won in division finals, 4–0 (Kings); Won in conference finals, 4–1 (Blackhawks); Won in Stanley Cup Final, 4–2 (Canadiens) † |
| 1989–90 | 1989–90 | Campbell | Smythe ↑ | 1st | 80 | 42 | 23 | 15 | — | 99 | 348 | 265 | 6 | 2 | 4 | 24 | 29 | Lost in division semifinals, 2–4 (Kings) |
| 1990–91 | 1990–91 | Campbell | Smythe | 2nd | 80 | 46 | 26 | 8 | — | 100 | 344 | 263 | 7 | 3 | 4 | 20 | 22 | Lost in division semifinals, 3–4 (Oilers) |
| 1991–92 | 1991–92 | Campbell | Smythe | 5th | 80 | 31 | 37 | 12 | — | 74 | 296 | 305 | Did not qualify | | | | | |
| 1992–93 | 1992–93 | Campbell | Smythe | 2nd | 84 | 43 | 30 | 11 | — | 97 | 322 | 282 | 6 | 2 | 4 | 28 | 33 | Lost in division semifinals, 2–4 (Kings) |
| 1993–94 | 1993–94 | Western | Pacific ↑ | 1st | 84 | 42 | 29 | 13 | — | 97 | 302 | 256 | 7 | 3 | 4 | 20 | 23 | Lost in conference quarterfinals, 3–4 (Canucks) |
| 1994–95 | 1994–95 | Western | Pacific ↑ | 1st | 48 | 24 | 17 | 7 | — | 55 | 163 | 135 | 7 | 3 | 4 | 35 | 26 | Lost in conference quarterfinals, 3–4 (Sharks) |
| 1995–96 | 1995–96 | Western | Pacific | 2nd | 82 | 34 | 37 | 11 | — | 79 | 241 | 240 | 4 | 0 | 4 | 7 | 16 | Lost in conference quarterfinals, 0–4 (Blackhawks) |
| 1996–97 | 1996–97 | Western | Pacific | 5th | 82 | 32 | 41 | 9 | — | 73 | 214 | 239 | Did not qualify | | | | | |
| 1997–98 | 1997–98 | Western | Pacific | 5th | 82 | 26 | 41 | 15 | — | 67 | 217 | 252 | Did not qualify | | | | | |
| 1998–99 | 1998–99 | Western | Northwest | 3rd | 82 | 30 | 40 | 12 | — | 72 | 211 | 234 | Did not qualify | | | | | |
| 1999–2000 | 1999–2000 | Western | Northwest | 4th | 82 | 31 | 36 | 10 | 5 | 77 | 211 | 256 | Did not qualify | | | | | |
| 2000–01 | 2000–01 | Western | Northwest | 4th | 82 | 27 | 36 | 15 | 4 | 73 | 197 | 236 | Did not qualify | | | | | |
| 2001–02 | 2001–02 | Western | Northwest | 4th | 82 | 32 | 35 | 12 | 3 | 79 | 201 | 220 | Did not qualify | | | | | |
| 2002–03 | 2002–03 | Western | Northwest | 5th | 82 | 29 | 36 | 13 | 4 | 75 | 186 | 228 | Did not qualify | | | | | |
| 2003–04 | 2003–04 | Western | Northwest | 3rd | 82 | 42 | 30 | 7 | 3 | 94 | 200 | 176 | 26 | 15 | 11 | 58 | 51 | Won in conference quarterfinals, 4–3 (Canucks); Won in conference semifinals, 4–2 (Red Wings); Won in conference finals, 4–2 (Sharks); Lost in Stanley Cup Final, 3–4 (Lightning) ‡ |
| 2004–05 | 2004–05 | Western | Northwest | Season cancelled due to 2004–05 NHL lockout | | | | | | | | | | | | | | |
| 2005–06 | 2005–06 | Western | Northwest ↑ | 1st | 82 | 46 | 25 | — | 11 | 103 | 216 | 193 | 7 | 3 | 4 | 16 | 17 | Lost in conference quarterfinals, 3–4 (Mighty Ducks) |
| 2006–07 | 2006–07 | Western | Northwest | 3rd | 82 | 43 | 29 | — | 10 | 96 | 255 | 221 | 6 | 2 | 4 | 10 | 18 | Lost in conference quarterfinals, 2–4 (Red Wings) |
| 2007–08 | 2007–08 | Western | Northwest | 3rd | 82 | 42 | 30 | — | 10 | 94 | 226 | 224 | 7 | 3 | 4 | 17 | 15 | Lost in conference quarterfinals, 3–4 (Sharks) |
| 2008–09 | 2008–09 | Western | Northwest | 2nd | 82 | 46 | 30 | — | 6 | 98 | 251 | 246 | 6 | 2 | 4 | 16 | 21 | Lost in conference quarterfinals, 2–4 (Blackhawks) |
| 2009–10 | 2009–10 | Western | Northwest | 3rd | 82 | 40 | 32 | — | 10 | 90 | 201 | 203 | Did not qualify | | | | | |
| 2010–11 | 2010–11 | Western | Northwest | 2nd | 82 | 41 | 29 | — | 12 | 94 | 241 | 230 | Did not qualify | | | | | |
| 2011–12 | 2011–12 | Western | Northwest | 2nd | 82 | 37 | 29 | — | 16 | 90 | 199 | 217 | Did not qualify | | | | | |
| 2012–13 | 2012–13 | Western | Northwest | 4th | 48 | 19 | 25 | — | 4 | 42 | 128 | 157 | Did not qualify | | | | | |
| 2013–14 | 2013–14 | Western | Pacific | 6th | 82 | 35 | 40 | — | 7 | 77 | 202 | 238 | Did not qualify | | | | | |
| 2014–15 | 2014–15 | Western | Pacific | 3rd | 82 | 45 | 30 | — | 7 | 97 | 237 | 213 | 11 | 5 | 6 | 27 | 33 | Won in first round, 4–2 (Canucks); Lost in second round, 1–4 (Ducks) |
| 2015–16 | 2015–16 | Western | Pacific | 5th | 82 | 35 | 40 | — | 7 | 77 | 229 | 257 | Did not qualify | | | | | |
| 2016–17 | 2016–17 | Western | Pacific | 4th | 82 | 45 | 33 | — | 4 | 94 | 222 | 219 | 4 | 0 | 4 | 9 | 14 | Lost in first round, 0–4 (Ducks) |
| 2017–18 | 2017–18 | Western | Pacific | 5th | 82 | 37 | 35 | — | 10 | 84 | 216 | 243 | Did not qualify | | | | | |
| 2018–19 | 2018–19 | Western | Pacific ↑ | 1st | 82 | 50 | 25 | — | 7 | 107 | 289 | 223 | 5 | 1 | 4 | 11 | 17 | Lost in first round, 1–4 (Avalanche) |
| 2019–20 | 2019–20 | Western | Pacific | 4th | 70 | 36 | 27 | — | 7 | 79 | 204 | 214 | 10 | 5 | 5 | 33 | 27 | Won in qualifying round, 3–1 (Jets); Lost in first round, 2–4 (Stars) |
| 2020–21 | 2020–21 | — | North | 5th | 56 | 26 | 27 | — | 3 | 55 | 155 | 160 | Did not qualify | | | | | |
| 2021–22 | 2021–22 | Western | Pacific ↑ | 1st | 82 | 50 | 21 | — | 11 | 111 | 291 | 206 | 12 | 5 | 7 | 35 | 39 | Won in first round, 4–3 (Stars); Lost in second round, 1–4 (Oilers) |
| 2022–23 | 2022–23 | Western | Pacific | 5th | 82 | 38 | 27 | — | 17 | 93 | 258 | 247 | Did not qualify | | | | | |
| 2023–24 | 2023–24 | Western | Pacific | 5th | 82 | 38 | 39 | — | 5 | 81 | 253 | 267 | Did not qualify | | | | | |
| 2024–25 | 2024–25 | Western | Pacific | 4th | 82 | 41 | 27 | — | 14 | 96 | 220 | 236 | Did not qualify | | | | | |
| 2025–26 | 2025–26 | Western | Pacific | 7th | 82 | 34 | 39 | — | 9 | 77 | 208 | 256 | Did not qualify | | | | | |
| Totals | | | | | 3,564 | 1,698 | 1,389 | 303 | 206 | 3,863 | 11,400 | 11,049 | 233 | 108 | 125 | 731 | 769 | 25 playoff appearances |

== See also ==
- List of Atlanta Flames seasons
