= List of NHL franchise post-season droughts =

Active and all-time National Hockey League (NHL) franchise post-season appearance, post-season series win, Stanley Cup Final and Stanley Cup droughts up to and including the 2026 Stanley Cup playoffs, are listed below. Those teams which have never made it in franchise history are listed by the season that they entered the league, either as a new franchise or when they merged into the NHL from the disbanded World Hockey Association (WHA) league. These lists do not include the cancelled 2004–05 NHL season when calculating "number of seasons".

Among the current 32 NHL teams, ten have never won the Stanley Cup, with the oldest of them being the Vancouver Canucks and the Buffalo Sabres (53 seasons). The longest Stanley Cup drought in NHL history belongs to the Toronto Maple Leafs (58 seasons). Five teams have never reached the Stanley Cup Final, with the oldest of them being the Winnipeg Jets franchise (51 seasons). In 2010, the Chicago Blackhawks ended what was the second-longest Stanley Cup championship drought at 49 seasons (now the sixth-longest). The end of that drought was the first of three consecutive years in which one of the eleven longest such droughts was broken (Chicago Blackhawks in 2010, Boston Bruins in 2011, and Los Angeles Kings in 2012).

The Detroit Red Wings currently have both the longest active playoff series win drought at 13 seasons and the longest active post-season appearance drought at 10 seasons. The Florida Panthers have the longest playoff series win drought in league history at 24 seasons, lasting from 1997 to 2022. The Buffalo Sabres have the longest post-season appearance drought at 14 seasons, lasting from 2012 to 2025.

== Longest active droughts ==
=== Post-season appearance droughts ===
A post-season appearance drought is continued by not making the NHL playoffs after the regular season. Since the first round of the playoffs normally consists of eight series (sixteen teams) and there were thirty-two active teams in the NHL during the 2025–26 season, there are sixteen teams that did not make the most recent playoffs on this list.

Team	Last appearance in post-season	Post-season drought
Detroit Red Wings	2015–16	10 seasons
San Jose Sharks	2018–19	7 seasons
Chicago Blackhawks	2019–20	6 seasons
Columbus Blue Jackets	2019–20	6 seasons
Calgary Flames	2021–22	4 seasons
Seattle Kraken	2022–23	3 seasons
Nashville Predators	2023–24	2 seasons
New York Islanders	2023–24	2 seasons
New York Rangers	2023–24	2 seasons
Vancouver Canucks	2023–24	2 seasons
Florida Panthers	2024–25	1 season
New Jersey Devils	2024–25	1 season
St. Louis Blues	2024–25	1 season
Toronto Maple Leafs	2024–25	1 season
Washington Capitals	2024–25	1 season
Winnipeg Jets	2024–25	1 season

=== Division championship droughts ===
This is a list of the teams and the number of seasons since they have won the Division championship. This list does not include the division champions in the 2025–26 NHL season: the Buffalo Sabres, Carolina Hurricanes, Colorado Avalanche, and Vegas Golden Knights.

Team	Last division championship win	Division championship drought
Edmonton Oilers	1986–87	38 seasons
New York Islanders	1987–88	37 seasons
Los Angeles Kings	1990–91	34 seasons
Columbus Blue Jackets	never (inception of franchise in 2000–01)	25 seasons
Ottawa Senators	2005–06	20 seasons
Minnesota Wild	2007–08	18 seasons
New Jersey Devils	2009–10	16 seasons
Detroit Red Wings	2010–11	15 seasons
Philadelphia Flyers	2010–11	15 seasons
San Jose Sharks	2010–11	15 seasons
Arizona Coyotes	2011–12	12 seasons^{1,2}
Anaheim Ducks	2016–17	9 seasons
Chicago Blackhawks	2016–17	9 seasons
Montreal Canadiens	2016–17	9 seasons
Nashville Predators	2018–19	7 seasons
Tampa Bay Lightning	2018–19	7 seasons
St. Louis Blues	2019–20	6 seasons
Pittsburgh Penguins	2020–21	5 seasons
Seattle Kraken	never (inception of franchise in 2021–22)	5 seasons
Calgary Flames	2021–22	4 seasons
Boston Bruins	2022–23	3 seasons
Dallas Stars	2023–24	2 seasons
Florida Panthers	2023–24	2 seasons
New York Rangers	2023–24	2 seasons
Utah Mammoth	never (inception of franchise in 2024–25)	2 seasons
Vancouver Canucks	2023–24	2 seasons
Toronto Maple Leafs	2024–25	1 season
Washington Capitals	2024–25	1 season
Winnipeg Jets	2024–25	1 season

^{1} franchise changed its name in 2014 from Phoenix to Arizona Coyotes
^{2} The team was inactive at the start of the 2024–25 NHL season.

=== Presidents' Trophy droughts ===
This is a list of the teams and the number of seasons since they have won the Presidents' Trophy as the regular season champions. This list does not include the most recent Presidents' Trophy champions: the Colorado Avalanche.

Team	Last Presidents' Trophy^{1}	Subsequent Presidents' Trophy runner-up finishes	Presidents' Trophy drought
Toronto Maple Leafs	1962–63		62 seasons^{1}
Los Angeles Kings	never (inception of franchise in 1967–68)		58 seasons^{1}
New Jersey Devils	never (inception of franchise in 1974–75)	3 : 1993–94, 1997–98, 1998–99	51 seasons^{1,2}
Montreal Canadiens	1977–78	4 : 1978–79, 1987–88, 1988–89, 2014–15	47 seasons^{1}
Carolina Hurricanes	never (franchise entered the NHL in 1979–80)	2 : 2022–23, 2025–26	46 seasons^{1,3}
New York Islanders	1981–82	1 : 1983–84	43 seasons^{1}
Philadelphia Flyers	1984–85	2 : 1985–86, 1986–87	40 seasons^{1}
Edmonton Oilers	1986–87		38 seasons
Calgary Flames	1988–89	2 : 1989–90, 2018–19	36 seasons
Pittsburgh Penguins	1992–93	2 : 2012–13, 2016–17	32 seasons
Anaheim Ducks	never (inception of franchise in 1993–94)	1 : 2013–14	32 seasons
Arizona Coyotes	never (inception of franchise in 1996–97)		27 seasons^{4}
Dallas Stars	1998–99	3 : 2002–03, 2015–16, 2023–24	26 seasons
St. Louis Blues	1999–2000	1 : 2019–20	25 seasons
Columbus Blue Jackets	never (inception of franchise in 2000–01)		25 seasons
Minnesota Wild	never (inception of franchise in 2000–01)		25 seasons
Ottawa Senators	2002–03	1 : 2005–06	22 seasons
Buffalo Sabres	2006–07		19 seasons
Detroit Red Wings	2007–08		18 seasons
San Jose Sharks	2008–09	1 : 2009–10	17 seasons
Vancouver Canucks	2011–12		14 seasons
Chicago Blackhawks	2012–13		13 seasons
Washington Capitals	2016–17	1 : 2024–25	9 seasons
Vegas Golden Knights	never (inception of franchise in 2017–18)	1 : 2020–21	9 seasons
Nashville Predators	2017–18		8 seasons
Tampa Bay Lightning	2018–19		7 seasons
Seattle Kraken	never (inception of franchise in 2021–22)		5 seasons
Florida Panthers	2021–22		4 seasons
Boston Bruins	2022–23		3 seasons
New York Rangers	2023–24		2 seasons
Utah Mammoth	never (inception of franchise in 2024–25)		2 seasons
Winnipeg Jets	2024–25		1 season

^{1} The trophy was introduced at the start of the 1985–86 NHL season.
^{2} includes 2 seasons of the Kansas City Scouts (1974–75 through 1975–76) + 6 seasons of the Colorado Rockies (1976–77 through 1981–82) + 42 season of the New Jersey Devils (1982–83 through 2024–25)
^{3} includes 18 seasons of the Hartford Whalers (1979–80 through 1996–97) + 27 seasons of the Carolina Hurricanes (1997–98 through 2024–25)
^{4} The team was inactive at the start of the 2024–25 NHL season.

=== Post-season series win droughts ===
A post-season series win drought is continued either by not making the playoffs in a season or by making the playoffs in a season and subsequently losing the first-round series. Since the first round of the NHL playoffs consists of eight series (sixteen teams), there will be twenty-four teams in this list – the sixteen teams that do not qualify for the post-season, plus the eight teams that lose their first-round series.

The other eight teams – the Anaheim Ducks, Buffalo Sabres, Carolina Hurricanes, Colorado Avalanche, Minnesota Wild, Montreal Canadiens, Philadelphia Flyers, and Vegas Golden Knights – all won a post-season series in the 2026 Stanley Cup playoffs.

Team	Last post-season series win	Subsequent post-season series losses	Post-season series win drought
Detroit Red Wings	2012–13	3 : 2013–14, 2014–15, 2015–16	13 seasons
Los Angeles Kings	2013–14	7 : 2015–16, 2017–18, 2021–22, 2022–23, 2023–24, 2024–25, 2025–26	12 seasons
Ottawa Senators	2016–17	2 : 2024–25, 2025–26	9 seasons
Nashville Predators	2017–18	5 : 2018–19, 2019–20, 2020–21, 2021–22, 2023–24	8 seasons
Pittsburgh Penguins	2017–18	5 : 2018–19, 2019–20, 2020–21, 2021–22, 2025–26	8 seasons
San Jose Sharks	2018–19		7 seasons
Chicago Blackhawks	2019–20		6 seasons
Columbus Blue Jackets	2019–20		6 seasons
New York Islanders	2020–21	2 : 2022–23, 2023–24	5 seasons
Arizona Coyotes	2019–20		4 seasons^{1}
Calgary Flames	2021–22		4 seasons
St. Louis Blues	2021–22	1 : 2024–25	4 seasons
Tampa Bay Lightning	2021–22	4 : 2022–23, 2023–24, 2024–25, 2025–26	4 seasons
New Jersey Devils	2022–23	1 : 2024–25	3 seasons
Seattle Kraken	2022–23		3 seasons
Boston Bruins	2023–24	1: 2025–26	2 seasons
New York Rangers	2023–24		2 seasons
Vancouver Canucks	2023–24		2 seasons
Utah Mammoth	never (inception of franchise in 2024–25)	1: 2025–26	2 seasons
Dallas Stars	2024–25	1: 2025–26	1 season
Edmonton Oilers	2024–25	1: 2025–26	1 season
Florida Panthers	2024–25		1 season
Toronto Maple Leafs	2024–25		1 season
Washington Capitals	2024–25		1 season
Winnipeg Jets	2024–25		1 season

^{1} The team was inactive at the start of the 2024–25 NHL season.

=== Stanley Cup Final droughts ===
This lists the teams and the number of seasons since they last reached the Stanley Cup Final. This list does not include the teams that made the 2026 Stanley Cup Final: the Carolina Hurricanes and Vegas Golden Knights.

Team	Last appearance in Stanley Cup Final	Subsequent conference finals losses^{1}	Stanley Cup Final drought
Toronto Maple Leafs	1966–67	5: 1977–78, 1992–93, 1993–94, 1998–99, 2001–02	59 seasons
Winnipeg Jets	never (franchise entered the NHL in 1979–80)	1: 2017–18	43 seasons^{2, 3}
New York Islanders	1983–84	3: 1992–93, 2019–20, 2020–21	41 seasons
Arizona Coyotes	never (inception of franchise in 1996–97)	1: 2011–12	27 seasons^{4}
Buffalo Sabres	1998–99	2: 2005–06, 2006–07	26 seasons
Columbus Blue Jackets	never (inception of franchise in 2000–01)		25 seasons
Minnesota Wild	never (inception of franchise in 2000–01)	1: 2002–03	25 seasons
Calgary Flames	2003–04		21 seasons
Anaheim Ducks	2006–07	2: 2014–15, 2016–17	19 seasons
Ottawa Senators	2006–07	1: 2016–17	19 seasons
Detroit Red Wings	2008–09		17 seasons
Philadelphia Flyers	2009–10		16 seasons
Vancouver Canucks	2010–11		15 seasons
New Jersey Devils	2011–12		14 seasons
Los Angeles Kings	2013–14		12 seasons
New York Rangers	2013–14	3: 2014–15, 2021–22, 2023–24	12 seasons
Chicago Blackhawks	2014–15		11 seasons
San Jose Sharks	2015–16	1: 2018–19	10 seasons
Nashville Predators	2016–17		9 seasons
Pittsburgh Penguins	2016–17		9 seasons
Washington Capitals	2017–18		8 seasons
Boston Bruins	2018–19		7 seasons
St. Louis Blues	2018–19		7 seasons
Dallas Stars	2019–20	3: 2022–23, 2023–24, 2024–25	6 seasons
Montreal Canadiens	2020–21	1: 2025–26	5 seasons
Seattle Kraken	never (inception of franchise in 2021–22)		5 seasons
Colorado Avalanche	2021–22	1: 2025–26	4 seasons
Tampa Bay Lightning	2021–22		4 seasons
Utah Mammoth	never (inception of franchise in 2024–25)		2 seasons
Edmonton Oilers	2024–25		1 season
Florida Panthers	2024–25		1 season

^{1} includes Semifinals up to and including 1980–81 and Stanley Cup Semifinals in 2020–21
^{2} includes 17 seasons for Winnipeg Jets (1979–80 through 1995–96) + 11 seasons for Atlanta Thrashers (1999–2000 through 2010–11) + 15 seasons for Winnipeg Jets (2011–12 through 2025–26).
^{3} The team was inactive from the 1996–97 to 1998–99 NHL season.
^{4} The team was inactive at the start of the 2024–25 NHL season.

=== Stanley Cup droughts ===
This is a list of the teams and the number of seasons since they have won the Stanley Cup. This list excludes the most recent Stanley Cup champions: the Carolina Hurricanes.

Team	Last Stanley Cup	Subsequent Stanley Cup Final losses	Stanley Cup drought
Toronto Maple Leafs	1966–67		59 seasons
Buffalo Sabres	never (inception of franchise in 1970–71)	2 : 1974–75, 1998–99	55 seasons
Vancouver Canucks	never (inception of franchise in 1970–71)	3 : 1981–82, 1993–94, 2010–11	55 seasons
Philadelphia Flyers	1974–75	6 : 1975–76, 1979–80, 1984–85, 1986–87, 1996–97, 2009–10	50 seasons
Winnipeg Jets	never (franchise entered the NHL in 1979–80)		43 seasons^{1, 2}
New York Islanders	1982–83	1 : 1983–84	42 seasons
Calgary Flames	1988–89	1 : 2003–04	37 seasons
Edmonton Oilers	1989–90	3 : 2005–06, 2023–24, 2024–25	35 seasons
San Jose Sharks	never (inception of franchise in 1991–92)	1 : 2015–16	34 seasons
Ottawa Senators	never (inception of franchise in 1992–93)	1 : 2006–07	34 seasons
Montreal Canadiens	1992–93	1 : 2020–21	33 seasons
New York Rangers	1993–94	1 : 2013–14	32 seasons
Nashville Predators	never (inception of franchise in 1998–99)	1 : 2016–17	28 seasons
Arizona Coyotes	never (inception of franchise in 1996–97)		27 seasons^{3}
Dallas Stars	1998–99	2 : 1999–2000, 2019–20	27 seasons
Columbus Blue Jackets	never (inception of franchise in 2000–01)		26 seasons
Minnesota Wild	never (inception of franchise in 2000–01)		26 seasons
New Jersey Devils	2002–03	1 : 2011–12	21 seasons
Anaheim Ducks	2006–07		19 seasons
Detroit Red Wings	2007–08	1 : 2008–09	18 seasons
Boston Bruins	2010–11	2 : 2012–13, 2018–19	15 seasons
Los Angeles Kings	2013–14		12 seasons
Chicago Blackhawks	2014–15		11 seasons
Pittsburgh Penguins	2016–17		9 seasons
Washington Capitals	2017–18		8 seasons
St. Louis Blues	2018–19		7 seasons
Seattle Kraken	never (inception of franchise in 2021–22)		5 seasons
Tampa Bay Lightning	2020–21	1 : 2021–22	5 seasons
Colorado Avalanche	2021–22		4 seasons
Vegas Golden Knights	2022–23	1 : 2025–26	3 seasons
Utah Mammoth	never (inception of franchise in 2024–25)		2 seasons
Florida Panthers	2024–25		1 season

^{1} includes 17 seasons for Winnipeg Jets (1979–80 through 1995–96) + 11 seasons for Atlanta Thrashers (1999–2000 through 2010–11) + 15 seasons for Winnipeg Jets (2011–12 through 2025–26)
^{2} The team was inactive from the 1996–97 to 1998–99 NHL season.
^{3} The team was inactive at the start of the 2024–25 NHL season.

=== Closest approaches without winning ===
Team	First NHL season	First round appearances^{1}	Second round appearances^{2}	Conference finals appearances^{3}	Stanley Cup Final appearances	Fewest wins short of Stanley Cup
Vancouver Canucks	1970–71	28	13	3	3	1 win short : 1993–94, 2010–11
Buffalo Sabres	1970–71	28	16	6	2	2 wins short : 1974–75, 1998–99
San Jose Sharks	1991–92	21	15	5	1	2 wins short : 2015–16
Nashville Predators	1998–99	15	5	1	1	2 wins short : 2016–17
Ottawa Senators	1992–93	18	7	3	1	3 wins short : 2006–07
Arizona Coyotes^{4}	1996–97	7	2	1		7 wins short : 2011–12
Winnipeg Jets^{5,6}	1979–80	16	5	1		7 wins short : 2017–18
Minnesota Wild	2000–01	14	4	1		8 wins short : 2002–03
Seattle Kraken	2021–22	1	1			9 wins short : 2022–23
Columbus Blue Jackets	2000–01	6	1			10 wins short : 2018–19
Utah Mammoth	2024–25	1				14 wins short : 2025–26

^{1} includes Preliminary Rounds from 1974–75 through 1980–81, Division Semifinals from 1981–82 through 1992–93 and Conference Quarterfinals from 1993–94 through 2012–13.
^{2} includes Quarterfinals from 1967–68 through 1980–81, Division Finals from 1981–82 through 1992–93 and Conference Semifinals from 1993–94 through 2012–13.
^{3} includes Semifinals up to and including 1980–81 and Stanley Cup Semifinals in 2020–21.
^{4} The team was inactive at the start of the 2024–25 NHL season.
^{5} includes 17 seasons for Winnipeg Jets (1979–80 through 1995–96) + 11 seasons for Atlanta Thrashers (1999–2000 through 2010–11) + 15 seasons for Winnipeg Jets (2011–12 through 2025–26).
^{6} The team was inactive from the 1996–97 to 1998–99 NHL season.

== Longest all-time droughts ==
=== Post-season appearance droughts ===
Active franchise streak is highlighted

Team	Previous post-season appearance	Next post-season appearance	Post-season drought
Buffalo Sabres	2010–11	2025–26	14 seasons
Florida Panthers	1999–00	2011–12	10 seasons^{1}
Edmonton Oilers	2005–06	2016–17	10 seasons
Detroit Red Wings	2015–16		10 seasons
Colorado Rockies / New Jersey Devils	1977–78	1987–88	9 seasons^{2}
Carolina Hurricanes	2008–09	2018–19	9 seasons
Boston Bruins	1958–59	1967–68	8 seasons
California Golden Seals / Cleveland Barons^{3}	1969–70	never (last season 1977–78)	8 seasons^{4}
Washington Capitals	never (first season 1974–75)	1982–83	8 seasons
Detroit Red Wings	1969–70	1977–78	7 seasons
New York Islanders	1993–94	2001–02	7 seasons
Calgary Flames	1995–96	2003–04^{5}	7 seasons
New York Rangers	1996–97	2005–06	7 seasons^{1}
Columbus Blue Jackets	never (first season 2000–01)	2008–09	7 seasons^{1}
Toronto Maple Leafs	2003–04	2012–13	7 seasons^{1}
Atlanta Thrashers / Winnipeg Jets	2006–07	2014–15	7 seasons^{6}
Phoenix / Arizona Coyotes	2011–12	2019–20	7 seasons
Ottawa Senators	2016–17	2024–25	7 seasons
Anaheim Ducks	2017–18	2025–26	7 seasons
San Jose Sharks	2018–19		7 seasons

^{1} no post-season occurred in 2005, due to the 2004–05 NHL Lockout
^{2} includes 4 seasons for Colorado Rockies (1978–79 through 1981–82) + 5 seasons for New Jersey Devils (1982–83 through 1986–87)
^{3} franchise dissolved in 1978 in a merger with the Minnesota North Stars (current Dallas Stars)
^{4} includes 6 seasons for California Golden Seals (1970–71 through 1975–76) + 2 seasons for Cleveland Barons (1976–77, 1977–78)
^{5} includes the Stanley Cup Final appearance in the same year
^{6} includes 4 seasons for Atlanta Thrashers (2007–08 through 2010–11) + 3 seasons for Winnipeg Jets (2011–12 through 2013–14)

=== Division championship droughts ===
Active franchise streak is highlighted

Team	Last division championship win	Next division championship win	Division championship drought
Edmonton Oilers	1986–87		38 seasons^{1}
New York Islanders	1987–88		37 seasons^{1}
Winnipeg Jets (original) / Atlanta Thrashers / Winnipeg Jets (modern)	never (franchise entered the NHL in 1979–80)	2024–25	35 seasons^{1,3,4}
Los Angeles Kings	1990–91		34 seasons^{1}
Toronto Maple Leafs	1937–38^{2}	1999–2000	32 seasons
New York Rangers	1931–32^{2}	1989–90	28 seasons
Columbus Blue Jackets	never (inception of franchise in 2000–01)		25 seasons^{1}
Los Angeles Kings	never (inception of franchise in 1967–68)	1990–91	23 seasons
Pittsburgh Penguins	never (inception of franchise in 1967–68)	1990–91^{5}	23 seasons
Kansas City Scouts / Colorado Rockies / New Jersey Devils	never (inception of franchise in 1974–75)	1996–97	22 seasons^{6}

^{1} no post-season occurred in 2005, due to the 2004–05 NHL Lockout
^{2} from 1938–1967 the NHL did not have any divisions.
^{3} includes 17 seasons of the Winnipeg Jets (1979–80 through 1995–96) + 11 seasons of the Atlanta Thrashers (1999–2000 through 2010–11) + 13 seasons of the Winnipeg Jets (2011–12 through 2023–24)
^{4} The team was inactive from the 1996–97 to 1998–99 NHL season.
^{5} won the Stanley Cup in the same year.
^{6} includes 2 seasons of the Kansas City Scouts (1974–75 through 1975–76) + 6 seasons of the Colorado Rockies (1976–77 through 1981–82) + 14 seasons of the New Jersey Devils (1982–83 through 1995–96)

=== Presidents' Trophy droughts ===
Active franchise streak is highlighted

Team	Last Presidents' Trophy^{1}	Subsequent Presidents' Trophy runner-up finishes	Next Presidents' Trophy	Presidents' Trophy drought
Toronto Maple Leafs	1962–63			62 seasons
Los Angeles Kings	never (inception of franchise in 1967–68)			58 seasons
Kansas City Scouts / Colorado Rockies / New Jersey Devils	never (inception of franchise in 1974–75)	3 : 1993–94, 1997–98, 1998–99		51 seasons^{2}
New York Rangers	1941–42	4 : 1957–58, 1967–68, 1970–71, 1971–72	1991–92	49 seasons
Montreal Canadiens	1977–78	4 : 1978–79, 1987–88, 1988–89, 2014–15		47 seasons
Hartford Whalers / Carolina Hurricanes	never (franchise entered the NHL in 1979–80)	1 : 2022–23		46 seasons^{3}
New York Islanders	1981–82	1 : 1983–84		43 seasons
Chicago Black Hawks	never (inception of franchise in 1926–27)	3 : 1962–63, 1963–64, 1965–66	1966–67	40 seasons
Philadelphia Flyers	1984–85	2 : 1985–86, 1986–87		40 seasons
Vancouver Canucks	never (inception of franchise in 1970–71)		2010–11^{6}	39 seasons

^{1} trophy was introduced at the start of the 1985–86
^{2} includes 2 seasons of the Kansas City Scouts (1974–75 through 1975–76) + 6 seasons of the Colorado Rockies (1976–77 through 1981–82) + 42 season of the New Jersey Devils (1982–83 through 2024–25)
^{3} includes 18 seasons of the Hartford Whalers (1979–80 through 1996–97) + 27 seasons of the Carolina Hurricanes (1997–98 through 2024–25)
^{4} includes the Stanley Cup Final appearance in the same year

=== Post-season series win droughts ===
Team	Previous post-season series win	Intervening post-season series losses	Next post-season series win	Post-season series win drought
Winnipeg Jets (original) / Atlanta Thrashers / Winnipeg Jets (modern)	1986–87	7 : 1987–88, 1989–90, 1991–92, 1992–93, 1995–96, 2006–07, 2014–15	2017–18	28 seasons^{1,2}
Florida Panthers	1995–96	6 : 1996–97, 1999–2000, 2011–12, 2015–16, 2019–20, 2020–21	2021–22	24 seasons
New York Islanders	1992–93	7 : 1993–94, 2001–02, 2002–03, 2003–04, 2006–07, 2012–13, 2014–15	2015–16	21 seasons
New York Rangers	1949–50	8 : 1955–56, 1956–57, 1957–58, 1961–62, 1966–67, 1967–68, 1968–69, 1969–70	1970–71	20 seasons
Buffalo Sabres	2006–07	2 : 2009–10, 2010–11	2025–26	18 seasons
Columbus Blue Jackets	never (inception of franchise in 2000–01)	4 : 2008–09, 2013–14, 2016–17, 2017–18	2018–19	17 seasons
Toronto Maple Leafs	2003–04	7 : 2012–13, 2016–17, 2017–18, 2018–19, 2019–20, 2020–21, 2021–22	2022–23	17 seasons
Chicago Black Hawks	1943–44	4 : 1945–46, 1952–53, 1958–59, 1959–60	1960–61^{3}	16 seasons
Hartford Whalers / Carolina Hurricanes	1985–86	8 : 1986–87, 1987–88, 1988–89, 1989–90, 1990–91, 1991–92, 1998–99, 2000–01	2001–02	15 seasons^{4}
Phoenix Coyotes^{4}	never (inception of franchise in 1996–97)	7 :1996–97, 1997–98, 1998–99, 1999–2000, 2001–02, 2009–10, 2010–11	2011–12	15 seasons^{5}

^{1} includes 9 seasons of the Winnipeg Jets (1987–88 through 1995–96) + 1 season of the Atlanta Thrashers (2006–07) + 1 season of the Winnipeg Jets (2014–15)
^{2} The team was inactive from the 1996–97 to 1998–99 NHL season.
^{3} won the Stanley Cup in the same year.
^{4} includes 11 seasons of the Hartford Whalers (1986–87 through 1996–97) + 4 season of the Carolina Hurricanes (1997–98 through 2000–01)
^{5} franchise renamed in 2014 as Arizona Coyotes

=== Stanley Cup Final droughts ===
Active franchise streak is highlighted

Team	Previous Stanley Cup Final	Intervening conference finals losses	Next Stanley Cup Final	Stanley Cup Final drought
Toronto Maple Leafs	1966–67	5: 1977–78, 1992–93, 1993–94, 1998–99, 2001–02		59 seasons
St. Louis Blues	1969–70	4: 1971–72, 1985–86, 2000–01, 2015–16	2018–19^{1}	47 seasons
Winnipeg Jets (original) / Atlanta Thrashers / Winnipeg Jets (modern)	never (inception of franchise in 1979–80)	1: 2017–18		43 seasons^{2,3}
New York Islanders	1983–84	3: 1992–93, 2019–20, 2020–21		41 seasons
Detroit Red Wings	1965–66	2: 1986–87, 1987–88	1994–95	28 seasons
Arizona Coyotes	never (franchise entered the NHL in 1996–97)	1: 2011–12		27 seasons^{4}
Montreal Canadiens	1992–93	2: 2009–10, 2013–14	2020–21	26 seasons
Buffalo Sabres	1998–99	2: 2005–06, 2006–07		26 seasons
Los Angeles Kings	never (inception of franchise in 1967–68)	1: 1968–69	1992–93	25 seasons
Florida Panthers	1995–96		2022–23	25 seasons
Columbus Blue Jackets	never (inception of franchise in 2000–01)			25 seasons
Minnesota Wild	never (inception of franchise in 2000–01)	1: 2002–03		25 seasons

^{1} won the Stanley Cup in the same year.
^{2} includes 17 seasons for Winnipeg Jets (1979–80 through 1995–96) + 11 seasons for Atlanta Thrashers (1999–2000 through 2010–11) + 15 seasons for Winnipeg Jets (2011–12 through 2025–26)
^{3} The team was inactive from the 1996–97 to 1998–99 NHL season.
^{4} The team was inactive at the start of the 2024–25 NHL season.

=== Stanley Cup droughts ===
Active franchise streak is highlighted

Team	Previous Stanley Cup	Intervening Stanley Cup Final losses	Next Stanley Cup	Stanley Cup drought
Toronto Maple Leafs	1966–67			59 seasons
Buffalo Sabres	never (inception of franchise in 1970–71)	2 : 1974–75, 1998–99		55 seasons
Vancouver Canucks	never (inception of franchise in 1970–71)	3 : 1981–82, 1993–94, 2010–11		55 seasons
New York Rangers	1939–40	3 : 1949–50, 1971–72, 1978–79	1993–94	53 seasons^{1}
St. Louis Blues	never (inception of franchise in 1967–68)	3 : 1967–68, 1968–69, 1969–70	2018–19	50 seasons
Philadelphia Flyers	1974–75	6 : 1975–76, 1979–80, 1984–85, 1986–87, 1996–97, 2009–10		50 seasons
Chicago Black Hawks^{2}	1960–61	5 : 1961–62, 1964–65, 1970–71, 1972–73, 1991–92	2009–10	47 seasons
Winnipeg Jets (original) / Atlanta Thrashers / Winnipeg Jets (modern)	never (franchise entered the NHL in 1979–80)			43 seasons^{3,4}
Los Angeles Kings	never (inception of franchise in 1967–68)	1 : 1992–93	2011–12	43 seasons
Washington Capitals	never (inception of franchise in 1974–75)	1 : 1997–98	2017–18	42 seasons
New York Islanders	1982–83	1 : 1983–84		42 seasons
Detroit Red Wings	1954–55	6 : 1955–56, 1960–61, 1962–63, 1963–64, 1965–66, 1994–95	1996–97	41 seasons

^{1} it is common to refer to the duration of the New York Rangers' record Stanley Cup drought as 54 "years" (1940 to 1994), but that only encompasses 53 seasons (1940–41 to 1992–93).
^{2} the name of the team was Black Hawks for a majority of the drought (25 of the 47 seasons) before being renamed to Blackhawks in 1986.
^{3} includes 17 seasons for Winnipeg Jets (1979–80 through 1995–96) + 11 seasons for Atlanta Thrashers (1999–2000 through 2010–11) + 15 seasons for Winnipeg Jets (2011–12 through 2025–26)
^{4} The team was inactive from the 1996–97 to 1998–99 NHL season.

== Cities/regions awaiting first Stanley Cup ==
This list only includes cities/regions currently hosting an NHL franchise.

City/Region	Seasons waiting	Stanley Cup Final appearances	Current NHL team
Buffalo	55	1974–75, 1998–99	Buffalo Sabres
Minneapolis–Saint Paul	51^{1}	1980–81^{2}, 1990–91^{2}	Minnesota Wild
San Francisco Bay	43^{3}	2015–16	San Jose Sharks
Nashville	27	2016–17	Nashville Predators
Columbus	25	Never	Columbus Blue Jackets
Salt Lake City	2	Never	Utah Mammoth

^{1} includes 26 seasons of the Minnesota North Stars (1967–68 through 1992–93) and all seasons of the Minnesota Wild which has been competing since 2000–01.
^{2} both Stanley Cup Final appearances by the Minnesota North Stars.
^{3} includes 9 seasons of the California Seals, Oakland Seals, California Golden Seals franchise (1967–68 through 1975–76) and all seasons of the San Jose Sharks which has been competing since 1991–92.

- Although the Vancouver Canucks have not won a Stanley Cup since inception of franchise in 1970–71, Vancouver has one Stanley Cup to its credit - the Vancouver Millionaires of the Pacific Coast Hockey Association won the Stanley Cup in 1915 prior to the founding of the NHL in 1917.
- While the current Ottawa Senators have never won the Stanley Cup since inception of franchise in 1992–93, Ottawa celebrated 11 Stanley Cup championships with the original era Ottawa Senators, the last one in 1927.
- While neither team called the Winnipeg Jets has ever won the Stanley Cup in Winnipeg, the city celebrated three Stanley Cup championships by the Winnipeg Victorias, the last in 1902, prior to the founding of the NHL in 1917. The original Winnipeg Jets team played between 1979–80 and 1995–96, while the current Winnipeg Jets team has been competing since 2011–12.
- The Seattle Kraken began play in 2021–22; however, the city of Seattle has one prior Stanley Cup championship as the Seattle Metropolitans of the Pacific Coast Hockey Association became the first U.S.-based team to win the Stanley Cup in 1917.

== Canadian droughts ==
Despite having fewer Canadian-based teams than U.S.-based ones throughout much of the NHL's existence (dating back to the Original Six era when it was two Canadian clubs to four American ones, and now seven to twenty-five since 2021), there have been only two times in league history where none of the Canadian teams qualified for the post-season: 1969–70 and 2015–16. The 1992–93 Montreal Canadiens remain the most recent Canadian club to win the Stanley Cup.

- Last time that all Canadian teams qualified for the playoffs: 1985–86
- Last time that no Canadian teams qualified for the playoffs: 2015–16
- Last all-Canadian first-round series: 2024–25 (Toronto vs. Ottawa)
- Last time all the Canadian teams were eliminated in the first round: 2018–19 (Calgary, Toronto, Winnipeg)
- Last all-Canadian second round series: 2023–24 (Edmonton vs. Vancouver)
- Last time all the Canadian teams were eliminated by the end of the second round: 2022–23 (Edmonton and Toronto)
- Last Conference Finals appearance by a Canadian team: 2025–26 (Montreal)
- Last all-Canadian conference finals: 1993–94 (Toronto vs. Vancouver)
- Last Stanley Cup Final appearance by a Canadian team: 2024–25 (Edmonton)
- Last all-Canadian Stanley Cup Final: 1988–89 (Calgary vs. Montreal)
- Last Stanley Cup won by a Canadian team: 1992–93 (Montreal)

== See also ==
- Season structure of the NHL
- List of NHL franchise post-season appearance streaks
- List of MLB franchise post-season droughts
- List of NBA franchise postseason droughts
- List of NFL franchise post-season droughts
