= Season structure of the NHL =

Structure of a season in the National Hockey League

The season structure of the National Hockey League (NHL) is divided into the pre-season, regular season, and the Stanley Cup playoffs. In the pre-season, which is generally held during the last two weeks of September, each team plays several not-for-the-record exhibition games. In the regular season, which generally runs from early October through early April, teams play 84 games which determine their standings. The three highest-placed teams in each division and two wild card teams per conference enter the playoff elimination tournament to determine the Stanley Cup champion.

== Pre-season ==
The NHL pre-season is generally held during the last two weeks of September. Each team plays roughly four exhibition games. These games allow coaches to evaluate their teams, new players to try out for roster and position spots, and established players to practice prior to competitive play. Teams may also have split squad games, in which parts of a team's roster play separate games.

Several pre-season games may be held at neutral sites. Since 2006 in Canada and 2015 in the U.S., Kraft Heinz has sponsored the Kraft Hockeyville contests, in which communities compete for the opportunity to host a pre-season game; Kraft Hockeyville would be discontinued in the U.S. following the 2020 edition. Several pre-season games held at international sites have also been scheduled, including games between an NHL team and a club from another league overseas.

== Regular season ==
Since the 2026–27 season, each team plays 84 regular season games, 42 each of home and road. In all, 1,344 games are scheduled (512 of them inter-conference).

For the 2026–27 season the season was extended from 82 to 84 games. Each team plays four games against the other teams in its division (a total of 28 games). Each team also plays all non-divisional teams in their own conference three times (24 games). The remaining games of the season are inter-conference play (32 games), allowing every team in the league to play every other team twice. The schedule is structured so that every NHL team plays in every arena at least once per season, which also include regular season games played outside North America and games played in outdoor stadiums.

Each team has a mandatory bye week near the midpoint of the season, during which no regular season games take place. The NHL All-Star Game and its accompanying festivities typically occur during the bye week. From 1998 to 2014, every four years in lieu of an All-Star break, there was a break for the Winter Olympic Games. However, the NHL prohibited players from participation in the 2018 Olympics and the 2022 Olympics.

The league also schedules a US Thanksgiving break and a three-day Christmas break (since 1971): no games are played on Christmas Eve or Christmas Day. Games are not played on December 26 unless it falls on a Saturday, in which case no games are played on December 23. The NHL also has a holiday roster freeze between December 18 and 27, in which in most cases, players cannot be traded, waived, or sent to the minor leagues.

On the day of the Super Bowl (second Sunday of February), the league avoids scheduling any games that night, and will either have a blank slate that day or have a few afternoon games, usually starting no later than 3 p.m. EST. The Montreal Canadiens and Washington Capitals are the only teams to host a home game on the day of the Super Bowl.

Two points are awarded for a win (including in overtime or shootout), one point for a loss in overtime or shootout, and no points for a loss in regulation time. If, however, a team pulls their goaltender for an extra attacker during overtime and gives up an empty-net goal, the point normally awarded for losing in overtime is forfeited. Prior to the 2004–05 NHL lockout, a goaltender was occasionally pulled in overtime near the end of a season if earning a single point would have been worthless for playoff qualification purposes, but with the introduction of the shootout it has not been done as often.

Conferences and divisions
Western Conference		Eastern Conference	
Pacific Division	Central Division	Atlantic Division	Metropolitan Division
Anaheim Ducks	Chicago Blackhawks	Boston Bruins	Carolina Hurricanes
Calgary Flames	Colorado Avalanche	Buffalo Sabres	Columbus Blue Jackets
Edmonton Oilers	Dallas Stars	Detroit Red Wings	New Jersey Devils
Los Angeles Kings	Minnesota Wild	Florida Panthers	New York Islanders
San Jose Sharks	Nashville Predators	Montreal Canadiens	New York Rangers
Seattle Kraken	St. Louis Blues	Ottawa Senators	Philadelphia Flyers
Vancouver Canucks	Utah Mammoth	Tampa Bay Lightning	Pittsburgh Penguins
Vegas Golden Knights	Winnipeg Jets	Toronto Maple Leafs	Washington Capitals

Regular season structure
Division	Schedule	Total games
Within division	4 games x 7 opponents	28
Within conference, non-divisional	3 games × 8 opponents	24
Inter-conference	2 games × 16 opponents	32

== Stanley Cup playoffs ==
At the end of the regular season, sixteen teams qualify for the Stanley Cup playoffs, an elimination tournament consisting of three rounds of best-of-seven series to determine which team from each conference will advance to the final round, dubbed the Stanley Cup Final. The top three teams in each division earn automatic berths (six teams per conference), and the next two teams in the conference earn wild-card spots. The First Round pits the top-ranked team in the conference against the lower-ranked wild-card, and the other division winner against the higher-ranked wild-card. The second- and third-place teams in each division play each other. The top-ranked team in a division, along with its wild-card opponent and the second- and third-ranked teams of the same division, comprise a group or bracket during the First Round, and the two winners will meet in the Second Round. The Western Conference (Pacific vs. Central divisional bracket winners) and Eastern Conference (Atlantic vs. Metropolitan divisional bracket winners) Finals will determine who faces off in the Stanley Cup Final.

Any ties in the standings are broken using the following protocols:

1. The fewest games played (only used during the season, as all teams will have played 82 games once the regular season is over; 84 from 2026-27 onwards).
2. The greater number of regulation wins only (used since the 2019–20 NHL season, reflected by the RW statistic).
3. The greater number of regulation and overtime wins, excluding shootouts (used since the 2010–11 NHL season, reflected by the ROW statistic).
4. The greater number of total wins, including shootouts.
5. The greater number of points earned in games between the tied clubs.
  1. If two clubs are tied, and have not played an equal number of home games against each other, the points earned and available in the first game played in the city of the club that had the greater number of home games in games between the two are not included.
  2. If more than two clubs are tied, the higher percentage of available points earned in games among those clubs, and not including any "odd" games, is used to determine the standing. The "odd" games are identical to those mentioned in the previous paragraph; that is, the first game in the city of the club that has had more home games in games between each club in the tie. Note that, because of this procedure, if two teams in the multi-team tie (also applicable in a two-team tie) have only played once against each other, the points earned in that game are not included.
6. The greater differential between goals for and goals against during the entire regular season.
7. The greater number of goals scored (used since 2019–20 NHL season, reflected by the GF statistic).
8. If two clubs are still tied on non-shootout wins, points earned between the tied clubs and regular-season goal differential, a one-game playoff is played under Stanley Cup playoff rules.

For the first two rounds, the higher-seeded team has home-ice advantage (regardless of point record). Thereafter, it goes to whoever has the better regular season record (no matter the seeding). The team with home-ice advantage hosts Games 1, 2, 5, and 7, while the opponent hosts Games 3, 4, and 6 (Games 5–7 are played "if necessary").

== See also ==
- List of NHL playoff series
- National Hockey League rivalries
- List of NHL franchise post-season appearance streaks
- List of NHL franchise post-season droughts
