= 2004–05 Columbus Blue Jackets season =

Cancelled National Hockey League season

2004–05 Columbus Blue Jackets
- Division: Central
- Conference: Western
- 2004–05 record: Did not play

Team information
- General manager: Doug MacLean
- Coach: Gerard Gallant
- Captain: Luke Richardson
- Arena: Nationwide Arena
- Minor league affiliates: Syracuse Crunch (AHL); Dayton Bombers (ECHL); Elmira Jackals (UHL)

The 2004–05 Columbus Blue Jackets season was the Blue Jackets' fifth season in the National Hockey League (NHL). The 2004–05 NHL lockout, however, cancelled the entirety of the season.

== Syracuse Crunch ==
A number of players from the Blue Jackets played the year with the team's American Hockey League (AHL) affiliate, the Syracuse Crunch. The Crunch finished the season in fifth place in the seven-team North Division with a 36–33–4–7 record, earning 83 points. However, they failed to qualify for the 2005 Calder Cup playoffs

== Europe ==
While some Blue Jackets joined the Crunch during the lockout, others crossed the Atlantic and played hockey in Europe. Reigning joint-Maurice "Rocket" Richard Trophy winner Rick Nash played for HC Davos in the National League A (NLA) in Switzerland, while David Vyborny returned to his native Czech Republic to play with Sparta Prague. Meanwhile, Nikolai Zherdev returned to Russia to play for former club CSKA Moscow.

== Schedule ==
The Blue Jackets preseason and regular season schedules were announced on July 13 and July 14, 2004, respectively.

2004–05 schedule
Preseason

Game	Date	Opponent
1	September 24	Buffalo Sabres
2	September 26	@ Chicago Blackhawks
3	September 29	Chicago Blackhawks
4	October 1	Nashville Predators
5	October 2	@ Nashville Predators
6	October 6	New York Rangers
7	October 8	Pittsburgh Penguins
8	October 9	@ Pittsburgh Penguins

Regular season

Game	Date	Opponent
1	October 15	Buffalo Sabres
2	October 16	@ Chicago Blackhawks
3	October 19	San Jose Sharks
4	October 21	Colorado Avalanche
5	October 23	@ Calgary Flames
6	October 24	@ Vancouver Canucks
7	October 26	@ Edmonton Oilers
8	October 28	@ Phoenix Coyotes
9	October 30	@ Dallas Stars
10	November 1	@ St. Louis Blues
11	November 5	Detroit Red Wings
12	November 7	Dallas Stars
13	November 9	Edmonton Oilers
14	November 12	Los Angeles Kings
15	November 13	@ Detroit Red Wings
16	November 18	Phoenix Coyotes
17	November 20	@ Dallas Stars
18	November 22	@ Colorado Avalanche
19	November 24	Dallas Stars
20	November 26	St. Louis Blues
21	December 1	@ Detroit Red Wings
22	December 3	@ Calgary Flames
23	December 5	@ Edmonton Oilers
24	December 6	@ Vancouver Canucks
25	December 9	Toronto Maple Leafs
26	December 11	@ St. Louis Blues
27	December 12	Vancouver Canucks
28	December 15	Minnesota Wild
29	December 17	Phoenix Coyotes
30	December 19	Tampa Bay Lightning
31	December 23	Chicago Blackhawks
32	December 26	Pittsburgh Penguins
33	December 28	Anaheim Mighty Ducks
34	December 29	@ Atlanta Thrashers
35	December 31	St. Louis Blues
36	January 2	@ Minnesota Wild
37	January 6	@ New York Rangers
38	January 7	@ Carolina Hurricanes
39	January 9	Calgary Flames
40	January 12	Chicago Blackhawks
41	January 14	Colorado Avalanche
42	January 15	@ Nashville Predators
43	January 17	@ Anaheim Mighty Ducks
44	January 20	@ San Jose Sharks
45	January 22	@ Los Angeles Kings
46	January 24	Minnesota Wild
47	January 26	Montreal Canadiens
48	January 28	@ Chicago Blackhawks
49	January 30	Anaheim Mighty Ducks
50	February 1	@ St. Louis Blues
51	February 2	@ Pittsburgh Penguins
52	February 5	@ New York Islanders
53	February 8	San Jose Sharks
54	February 10	Nashville Predators
55	February 15	Edmonton Oilers
56	February 17	New York Rangers
57	February 20	@ Chicago Blackhawks
58	February 23	Nashville Predators
59	February 25	Chicago Blackhawks
60	February 26	Florida Panthers
61	February 28	@ New Jersey Devils
62	March 4	Nashville Predators
63	March 5	St. Louis Blues
64	March 7	@ Boston Bruins
65	March 9	Los Angeles Kings
66	March 11	Detroit Red Wings
67	March 12	@ Minnesota Wild
68	March 14	@ Nashville Predators
69	March 16	@ Washington Capitals
70	March 18	Vancouver Canucks
71	March 21	@ Philadelphia Flyers
72	March 23	Boston Bruins
73	March 25	@ Colorado Avalanche
74	March 26	@ San Jose Sharks
75	March 28	@ Phoenix Coyotes
76	March 30	Calgary Flames
77	April 1	@ Detroit Red Wings
78	April 2	Ottawa Senators
79	April 5	@ Nashville Predators
80	April 6	Detroit Red Wings
81	April 9	@ Los Angeles Kings
82	April 10	@ Anaheim Mighty Ducks

== Transactions ==
The Blue Jackets were involved in the following transactions from June 8, 2004, the day after the deciding game of the 2004 Stanley Cup Finals, through February 16, 2005, the day the 2004–05 season was officially cancelled.

=== Trades ===
Date	Details		Ref
June 16, 2004	To Columbus Blue Jackets: Arturs Irbe	To Carolina Hurricanes: Future considerations	
June 26, 2004	To Columbus Blue Jackets: 1st-round pick in 2004; 2nd-round pick in 2004	To Carolina Hurricanes: 1st-round pick in 2004	
June 26, 2004	To Columbus Blue Jackets: 2nd-round pick in 2004	To Calgary Flames: 3rd-round pick in 2004; 3rd-round pick in 2004	
June 27, 2004	To Columbus Blue Jackets: 9th-round pick in 2004	To Los Angeles Kings: 8th-round pick in 2005 (Note: This pick was later upgraded to a 7th-round pick when the draft was reduced to seven rounds.)	
July 6, 2004	To Columbus Blue Jackets: Radoslav Suchy; 6th-round pick in 2005	To Phoenix Coyotes: 4th-round pick in 2005	

=== Players acquired ===
Date	Player	Former team	Term	Via	Ref
June 28, 2004	Geoff Sanderson	Vancouver Canucks		Waivers	
July 8, 2004	Andre Lakos	Vienna Capitals (EBEL)		Free agency	
July 8, 2004	Matthias Trattnig	Kassel Huskies (DEL)		Free agency	
September 7, 2004	Jeff Panzer	St. Louis Blues		Waivers	
September 14, 2004	Francois Beauchemin	Montreal Canadiens		Waivers	

=== Players lost ===
Date	Player	New team	Via (Note: In parentheses is the player’s free agency group on July 1 if applicable.)	Ref
June 19, 2004	Fred Brathwaite	Ak Bars Kazan (RSL)	Free agency (III)	
July 1, 2004	Brian Holzinger (Note: Holzinger retired.)		Contract expiration (III)	
July 2, 2004	Donald MacLean	Espoo Blues (Liiga)	Free agency (VI)	
July 29, 2004	David Ling	St. John's Maple Leafs (AHL)	Free agency (UFA)	
September 15, 2004	Anders Eriksson	Calgary Flames	Free agency (UFA)	
September 15, 2004	Tyler Sloan	Syracuse Crunch (AHL)	Free agency (UFA)	
October 15, 2004	Brendan Buckley	Worcester IceCats (AHL)	Free agency (UFA)	

=== Signings ===
Date	Player	Term	Contract type	Ref
June 10, 2004	Rostislav Klesla	1-year	Re-signing	
June 28, 2004	Karl Goehring		Option exercised	
June 30, 2004	Tyler Kolarik		Entry-level	
June 30, 2004	Kent McDonell	1-year	Option exercised	
June 30, 2004	Raffaele Sannitz		Entry-level	
July 8, 2004	Mark Hartigan		Re-signing	
July 22, 2004	Darrel Scoville	1-year	Option exercised	
August 26, 2004	Mike Pandolfo		Re-signing	
August 31, 2004	Brad Moran		Re-signing	
September 14, 2004	Marc Denis	multi-year	Re-signing	
September 14, 2004	David Vyborny	multi-year	Re-signing	

== Draft picks ==
Columbus' draft picks at the 2004 NHL entry draft.

Round	#	Player	Nationality	College/Junior/Club team (League)
1	8	Alexandre Picard	Canada	Lewiston Maineiacs (QMJHL)
2	46	Adam Pineault	United States	Boston College (Hockey East)
2	59	Kyle Wharton	Canada	Ottawa 67's (OHL)
3	93	Dan LaCosta	Canada	Owen Sound Attack (OHL)
3	96	Andrei Plekhanov	Russia	Neftekhimik Nizhnekamsk (Russia)
5	133	Petr Pohl	Czech Republic	Gatineau Olympiques (QMJHL)
6	167	Robert Page	United States	The Blake School (USHS–MN)
6	190	Lennart Petrell	Finland	HIFK (Finland)
7	198	Justin Vienneau	Canada	Shawinigan Cataractes (QMJHL)
8	231	Brian McGuirk	United States	Governor Dummer Academy (USHS–MA)
8	233	Matt Greer	United States	White Bear Lake Area High School (USHS–MN)
9	271	Grant Clitsome	Canada	Nepean Raiders (CJAHL)
