= List of Carolina Hurricanes seasons =

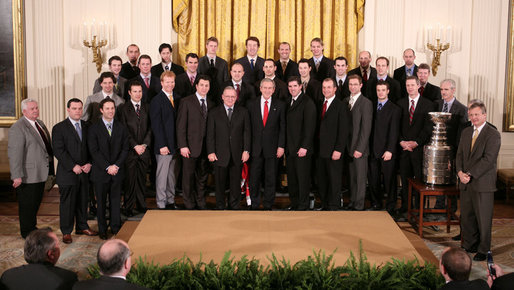
President George W. Bush poses for a photo on February 2, 2007, with the Carolina Hurricanes, winners of the 2006 Stanley Cup, in the East Room of the White House.

The Carolina Hurricanes are a professional ice hockey team based in Raleigh, North Carolina. The team is a member of the Metropolitan Division in the Eastern Conference of the National Hockey League (NHL). This list documents the records and playoff results for all 28 seasons the Carolina Hurricanes have completed in the NHL since their relocation from Hartford, Connecticut, in 1997. The Hurricanes franchise was founded in 1971 as the New England Whalers, and played seven seasons in the World Hockey Association (WHA). The team moved to the NHL in 1979, and changed its to the Hartford Whalers. The franchise played a total of 18 seasons before moving to North Carolina and changing their names to the Carolina Hurricanes. The Hurricanes are the only major professional sports team located in Raleigh. They are also the only North Carolina-based major professional sports team to ever win a championship.

Carolina played its first season in the Northeast Division before moving to the Southeast Division when the NHL realigned in 1998–99. The Hurricanes won two Stanley Cups in 2005–06 and 2025–26, and three Prince of Wales Trophy as Eastern Conference champions in 2001–02, 2005–06 and 2025–26. Carolina has finished atop its division seven times in its history. The Hurricanes have played in over 2,200 games and qualified for the Stanley Cup playoffs 13 times. The 2021–22 season represented the 25th in North Carolina.

== Table key ==
Key of colors and symbols
Color/symbol	Explanation
†	Stanley Cup champions
‡	Conference champions
↑	Division champions

Key of terms and abbreviations
Term or abbreviation	Definition
Finish	Final position in division or league standings
GP	Number of games played
W	Number of wins
L	Number of losses
T	Number of ties
OT	Number of losses in overtime (since the 1999–2000 season)
Pts	Number of points
GF	Goals for (goals scored by the Hurricanes)
GA	Goals against (goals scored by the Hurricanes' opponents)
—	Does not apply

== Year by year ==
Season	Team	Conference	Division	Regular season									Postseason					
Season	Team	Conference	Division	Finish	GP	W	L	T	OT	Pts	GF	GA	GP	W	L	GF	GA	Result
Relocated from Hartford
1997–98	1997–98	Eastern	Northeast	6th	82	33	41	8	—	74	200	219	Did not qualify					
1998–99	1998–99	Eastern	Southeast↑	1st	82	34	30	18	—	86	210	202	6	2	4	8	18	Lost in conference quarterfinals, 2–4 (Bruins)
1999–2000	1999–2000	Eastern	Southeast	3rd	82	37	35	10	—	84	217	216	Did not qualify					
2000–01	2000–01	Eastern	Southeast	2nd	82	38	32	9	3	88	212	225	6	2	4	8	20	Lost in conference quarterfinals, 2–4 (Devils)
2001–02	2001–02	Eastern‡	Southeast↑	1st	82	35	26	16	5	91	217	217	23	13	10	47	43	Won in conference quarterfinals, 4–2 (Devils); Won in conference semifinals, 4–2 (Canadiens); Won in conference finals, 4–2 (Maple Leafs); Lost in Stanley Cup Final, 1–4 (Red Wings)
2002–03	2002–03	Eastern	Southeast	5th	82	22	43	11	6	61	171	240	Did not qualify					
2003–04	2003–04	Eastern	Southeast	3rd	82	28	34	14	6	76	172	209	Did not qualify					
2004–05	2004–05	Eastern	Southeast	Season canceled due to 2004–05 NHL lockout														
2005–06	2005–06	Eastern‡	Southeast↑	1st	82	52	22	—	8	112	286	258	25	16	9	73	60	Won in conference quarterfinals, 4–2 (Canadiens); Won in conference semifinals, 4–1 (Devils); Won in conference finals, 4–3 (Sabres); Won in Stanley Cup Final, 4–3 (Oilers)†
2006–07	2006–07	Eastern	Southeast	3rd	82	40	34	—	8	88	241	248	Did not qualify					
2007–08	2007–08	Eastern	Southeast	2nd	82	43	33	—	6	92	250	246	Did not qualify					
2008–09	2008–09	Eastern	Southeast	2nd	82	45	30	—	7	97	236	221	18	8	10	42	50	Won in conference quarterfinals, 4–3 (Devils); Won in conference semifinals, 4–3 (Bruins); Lost in conference finals, 0–4 (Penguins)
2009–10	2009–10	Eastern	Southeast	3rd	82	35	37	—	10	80	226	251	Did not qualify					
2010–11	2010–11	Eastern	Southeast	3rd	82	40	31	—	11	91	231	234	Did not qualify					
2011–12	2011–12	Eastern	Southeast	5th	82	33	33	—	16	82	212	237	Did not qualify					
2012–13	2012–13	Eastern	Southeast	3rd	48	19	25	—	4	42	127	159	Did not qualify					
2013–14	2013–14	Eastern	Metropolitan	7th	82	36	35	—	11	83	205	226	Did not qualify					
2014–15	2014–15	Eastern	Metropolitan	8th	82	30	41	—	11	71	183	219	Did not qualify					
2015–16	2015–16	Eastern	Metropolitan	6th	82	35	31	—	16	86	196	221	Did not qualify					
2016–17	2016–17	Eastern	Metropolitan	7th	82	36	31	—	15	87	212	230	Did not qualify					
2017–18	2017–18	Eastern	Metropolitan	6th	82	36	35	—	11	83	225	253	Did not qualify					
2018–19	2018–19	Eastern	Metropolitan	4th	82	46	29	—	7	99	243	221	15	8	7	39	42	Won in first round, 4–3 (Capitals); Won in second round, 4–0 (Islanders); Lost in conference finals, 0–4 (Bruins)
2019–20	2019–20	Eastern	Metropolitan	4th	68	38	25	—	5	81	217	193	8	4	4	22	19	Won in qualifying round, 3–0 (Rangers); Lost in first round, 1–4 (Bruins)
2020–21	2020–21	—	Central↑	1st	56	36	12	—	8	80	175	134	11	5	6	31	30	Won in first round, 4–2 (Predators); Lost in second round, 1–4 (Lightning)
2021–22	2021–22	Eastern	Metropolitan↑	1st	82	54	20	—	8	116	277	200	14	7	7	37	40	Won in first round, 4–3 (Bruins); Lost in second round, 3–4 (Rangers)
2022–23	2022–23	Eastern	Metropolitan↑	1st	82	52	21	—	9	113	262	210	15	8	7	46	38	Won in first round, 4–2 (Islanders); Won in second round, 4–1 (Devils); Lost in conference finals, 0–4 (Panthers)
2023–24	2023–24	Eastern	Metropolitan	2nd	82	52	23	—	7	111	277	211	11	6	5	38	32	Won in first round, 4–1 (Islanders); Lost in second round, 2–4 (Rangers)
2024–25	2024–25	Eastern	Metropolitan	2nd	82	47	30	—	5	99	266	230	15	9	6	44	39	Won in first round, 4–1 (Devils); Won in second round, 4–1 (Capitals); Lost in conference finals, 1–4 (Panthers)
2025–26	2025–26	Eastern‡	Metropolitan↑	1st	82	53	22	—	7	113	291	236	19	16	3	66	39	Won in first round, 4–0 (Senators); Won in second round, 4–0 (Flyers); Won in conference finals, 4–1 (Canadiens); Won in Stanley Cup Final, 4–2 (Golden Knights)†
Totals					2,222	1,085	841	86	210	2,466	6,335	6,244	186	104	82	503	470	13 playoff appearances

== See also ==
- List of Hartford Whalers seasons
