= 2004–05 Dallas Stars season =

National Hockey League team season

2004–05 Dallas Stars
- Division: Pacific
- Conference: Western
- 2004–05 record: Did not play

Team information
- General manager: Doug Armstrong
- Coach: Dave Tippett
- Captain: Mike Modano
- Arena: American Airlines Center
- Minor league affiliates: Hamilton Bulldogs; Houston Aeros

The 2004–05 Dallas Stars season was their 38th National Hockey League season, and their 12th season in Dallas, however its games were cancelled as the 2004–05 NHL lockout could not be resolved in time.

== Off-season ==
The Stars chose Mark Fistric with their first-round pick, 28th overall.

== Schedule ==
The Stars preseason and regular season schedules were announced on July 12 and July 14, 2004, respectively.

2004–05 schedule
Preseason

Game	Date	Opponent
1	September 25	@ Colorado Avalanche
2	September 27	Atlanta Thrashers
3	September 28	@ St. Louis Blues
4	September 30	Colorado Avalanche
5	October 2	Detroit Red Wings
6	October 7	@ Detroit Red Wings
7	October 9	St. Louis Blues

Regular season

Game	Date	Opponent
1	October 13	@ Phoenix Coyotes
2	October 14	Phoenix Coyotes
3	October 16	Boston Bruins
4	October 20	Nashville Predators
5	October 22	Buffalo Sabres
6	October 24	@ Chicago Blackhawks
7	October 27	@ Detroit Red Wings
8	October 29	Edmonton Oilers
9	October 30	Columbus Blue Jackets
10	November 1	Minnesota Wild
11	November 3	Chicago Blackhawks
12	November 7	@ Columbus Blue Jackets
13	November 10	@ Carolina Hurricanes
14	November 12	@ New Jersey Devils
15	November 13	@ New York Islanders
16	November 16	@ Toronto Maple Leafs
17	November 18	@ Ottawa Senators
18	November 20	Columbus Blue Jackets
19	November 23	Anaheim Mighty Ducks
20	November 24	@ Columbus Blue Jackets
21	November 26	San Jose Sharks
22	November 28	@ Anaheim Mighty Ducks
23	November 30	@ Los Angeles Kings
24	December 2	@ San Jose Sharks
25	December 4	@ Phoenix Coyotes
26	December 8	Philadelphia Flyers
27	December 11	@ Minnesota Wild
28	December 13	San Jose Sharks
29	December 15	St. Louis Blues
30	December 17	@ Washington Capitals
31	December 19	@ Chicago Blackhawks
32	December 20	@ Minnesota Wild
33	December 22	Anaheim Mighty Ducks
34	December 26	@ Nashville Predators
35	December 27	Detroit Red Wings
36	December 29	Los Angeles Kings
37	December 31	Colorado Avalanche
38	January 2	@ Tampa Bay Lightning
39	January 4	Phoenix Coyotes
40	January 6	@ San Jose Sharks
41	January 8	@ Vancouver Canucks
42	January 11	@ Calgary Flames
43	January 13	@ Edmonton Oilers
44	January 15	@ Montreal Canadiens
45	January 17	@ Detroit Red Wings
46	January 19	Nashville Predators
47	January 21	Detroit Red Wings
48	January 23	@ Atlanta Thrashers
49	January 25	Calgary Flames
50	January 26	@ Colorado Avalanche
51	January 28	@ San Jose Sharks
52	January 31	Los Angeles Kings
53	February 2	Minnesota Wild
54	February 5	@ St. Louis Blues
55	February 7	Anaheim Mighty Ducks
56	February 9	Chicago Blackhawks
57	February 16	Colorado Avalanche
58	February 19	@ St. Louis Blues
59	February 20	Washington Capitals
60	February 23	@ Los Angeles Kings
61	February 25	@ Anaheim Mighty Ducks
62	February 27	Vancouver Canucks
63	March 2	Calgary Flames
64	March 4	@ Colorado Avalanche
65	March 6	Carolina Hurricanes
66	March 9	New York Rangers
67	March 11	Los Angeles Kings
68	March 12	@ Nashville Predators
69	March 14	Tampa Bay Lightning
70	March 16	Pittsburgh Penguins
71	March 18	Edmonton Oilers
72	March 20	Vancouver Canucks
73	March 23	Florida Panthers
74	March 26	@ Anaheim Mighty Ducks
75	March 28	@ Los Angeles Kings
76	March 30	@ Vancouver Canucks
77	April 1	@ Edmonton Oilers
78	April 2	@ Calgary Flames
79	April 4	San Jose Sharks
80	April 6	Phoenix Coyotes
81	April 8	@ Phoenix Coyotes
82	April 10	St. Louis Blues

== Transactions ==
The Stars were involved in the following transactions from June 8, 2004, the day after the deciding game of the 2004 Stanley Cup Finals, through February 16, 2005, the day the 2004–05 season was officially cancelled.

=== Trades ===
Date	Details		Ref
June 25, 2004	To Dallas Stars: Rights to Shawn Belle	To St. Louis Blues: Jason Bacashihua	
June 26, 2004	To Dallas Stars: 1st-round pick in 2004; 3rd-round pick in 2004	To New Jersey Devils: 1st-round pick in 2004	
June 26, 2004	To Dallas Stars: 1st-round pick in 2004; 2nd-round pick in 2004; 3rd-round pick in 2004	To San Jose Sharks: 1st-round pick in 2004; 5th-round pick in 2004	
June 26, 2004	To Dallas Stars: 3rd-round pick in 2005	To Vancouver Canucks: 3rd-round pick in 2004	
June 26, 2004	To Dallas Stars: 3rd-round pick in 2005	To Washington Capitals: 3rd-round pick in 2004	
June 29, 2004	To Dallas Stars: Jaroslav Svoboda	To Carolina Hurricanes: 4th-round pick in 2005	

=== Players acquired ===
Date	Player	Former team	Term	Via	Ref
September 9, 2004	Patrick Traverse	Montreal Canadiens	1-year	Free agency	

=== Players lost ===
Date	Player	New team	Via (Note: In parentheses is the player’s free agency group on July 1 if applicable.)	Ref
July 1, 2004	Andrew Berenzweig (Note: Berenzweig retired.)		Contract expiration (VI)	
July 1, 2004	Valeri Bure (Note: Bure was inactive during the 2004–05 season.)		Contract expiration (UFA)	
July 1, 2004	Shayne Corson (Note: Corson retired.)		Contract expiration (III)	
July 1, 2004	Teppo Numminen (Note: Numminen was inactive during the 2004–05 season.)		Contract expiration (III)	
July 1, 2004	Chris Therien (Note: Therien was inactive during the 2004–05 season.)		Contract expiration (III)	
July 1, 2004	Ron Tugnutt (Note: Tugnutt retired.)		Contract expiration (III)	
July 8, 2004	Lubomir Sekeras	Nurnberg Ice Tigers (DEL)	Free agency (UFA)	
July 8, 2004	Mark Wotton	SKA Saint Petersburg (RSL)	Free agency (VI)	
July 12, 2004	Richard Matvichuk	New Jersey Devils	Free agency (III)	
July 22, 2004	Jeff MacMillan	New York Rangers	Free agency (VI)	
July 23, 2004	Gavin Morgan	Montreal Canadiens	Free agency (VI)	
July 28, 2004	Jarrod Skalde	Tampa Bay Lightning	Free agency (UFA)	
August 6, 2004	Jeff Bateman	Atlantic City Boardwalk Bullies (ECHL)	Free agency (UFA)	
August 25, 2004	Brett Draney	Idaho Steelheads (ECHL)	Free agency (UFA)	
August 25, 2004	Barrett Heisten	New York Islanders	Free agency (UFA)	
September 9, 2004	Blake Sloan	Grand Rapids Griffins (AHL)	Free agency (UFA)	
September 30, 2004	Mike Siklenka	EC KAC (EBEL)	Free agency (II) (Note: The Stars retained Siklenka’s NHL rights and re-signed him on August 15, 2005.)	
N/A	Justin Cox	Idaho Steelheads (ECHL)	Free agency (UFA)	
October 14, 2004	Mike Sgroi	Wheeling Nailers (ECHL)	Free agency (UFA)	
October 16, 2004	Rob Valicevic	Flint Generals (UHL)	Free agency (UFA)	
January 5, 2005	Scott Young	Memphis RiverKings (CHL)	Free agency (III)	
January 13, 2005	David Oliver	Guildford Flames (BNL)	Free agency (III)	

=== Signings ===
Date	Player	Term	Contract type	Ref
June 14, 2004	Rob DiMaio	1-year	Re-signing	
June 14, 2004	Don Sweeney	1-year	Re-signing	
June 24, 2004	Jason Arnott	1-year	Re-signing	
June 24, 2004	Jon Klemm	2-year (Note: Club option for a third year.)	Re-signing	
June 28, 2004	Niko Kapanen	1-year	Re-signing	
July 1, 2004	Aaron Downey	1-year	Re-signing	
July 30, 2004	John Erskine	1-year	Re-signing	
August 3, 2004	Stu Barnes	2-year	Extension	
August 10, 2004	Jaroslav Svoboda	1-year (Note: Club option for a second year.)	Re-signing	

== Draft picks ==
Dallas' picks at the 2004 NHL entry draft, which was held at the RBC Center in Raleigh, North Carolina, on June 26–27, 2004.

Round	Pick	Player	Position	Nationality	Team (league)
1	28	Mark Fistric	Defense	Canada	Vancouver Giants (WHL)
2	34	Johan Fransson	Defense	Sweden	Luleå HF (Elitserien)
2	52	Raymond Sawada	Right wing	Canada	Nanaimo Clippers (BCHL)
2	56	Nicklas Grossmann	Defense	Sweden	Södertälje SK Jr. (Sweden)
3	86	John Lammers	Left wing	Canada	Lethbridge Hurricanes (WHL)
4	104	Fredrik Naslund	Left wing	Sweden	VIK Västerås HK (Elitserien)
6	183	Trevor Ludwig	Defense	United States	Texas Tornado (NAHL)
7	218	Sergei Kukushkin	Left wing	Belarus	Yunost Minsk (Belarus)
8	248	Lukas Vomela	Defense	Czech Republic	HC České Budějovice (Czech Extraliga)
9	280	Matt McKnight	Center	Canada	Camrose Kodiaks (AJHL)
