= List of Dallas Stars seasons =

The Dallas Stars are a professional ice hockey team based in Dallas. The team is a member of the Central Division of the Western Conference of the National Hockey League (NHL). The team started as Minnesota North Stars when the NHL expanded in 1967. The North Stars later relocated from Minnesota to Dallas before the 1993–94 season. The Stars have reached three Stanley Cup Finals, winning it once in 1999.

== Table key ==
Key of colors and symbols
Color/symbol	Explanation
†	Stanley Cup champions
‡	Conference champions
↑	Division champions
#	Led league in points

Key of terms and abbreviations
Term or abbreviation	Definition
Finish	Final position in division or league standings
GP	Number of games played
W	Number of wins
L	Number of losses
T	Number of ties
OT	Number of losses in overtime (since the 1999–2000 season)
Pts	Number of points
GF	Goals for (goals scored by the Stars)
GA	Goals against (goals scored by the Stars' opponents)
—	Does not apply

== Year by year ==
Season	Stars season	Conference	Division	Regular season									Postseason					
Season	Stars season	Conference	Division	Finish	GP	W	L	T	OT	Pts	GF	GA	GP	W	L	GF	GA	Result
Relocated from Minnesota
1993–94	1993–94	Western	Central	3rd	84	42	29	13	—	97	286	265	9	5	4	27	28	Won in conference quarterfinals, 4–0 (Blues); Lost in conference semifinals, 1–4 (Canucks)
1994–95^{1}	1994–95	Western	Central	5th	48	17	23	8	—	42	136	135	5	1	4	10	17	Lost in conference quarterfinals, 1–4 (Red Wings)
1995–96	1995–96	Western	Central	6th	82	26	42	14	—	66	227	280	—	—	—	—	—	Did not qualify
1996–97	1996–97	Western	Central↑	1st	82	48	26	8	—	104	252	198	7	3	4	18	21	Lost in conference quarterfinals, 3–4 (Oilers)
1997–98	1997–98	Western	Central↑	1st	82	49	22	11	—	109#	242	167	17	10	7	36	32	Won in conference quarterfinals, 4–2 (Sharks); Won in conference semifinals, 4–1 (Oilers); Lost in conference finals, 2–4 (Red Wings)
1998–99	1998–99	Western‡	Pacific↑	1st	82	51	19	12	—	114#	236	168	23	16	7	64	44	Won in conference quarterfinals, 4–0 (Oilers); Won in conference semifinals, 4–2 (Blues); Won in conference finals, 4–3 (Avalanche); Won in Stanley Cup Final, 4–2 (Sabres)†
1999–00	1999–00	Western‡	Pacific↑	1st	82	43	23	10	6	102	211	184	23	14	9	52	46	Won in conference quarterfinals, 4–1 (Oilers); Won in conference semifinals, 4–1 (Sharks); Won in conference finals, 4–3 (Avalanche); Lost in Stanley Cup Final, 2–4 (Devils)
2000–01	2000–01	Western	Pacific↑	1st	82	48	24	8	2	106	241	187	10	4	6	22	26	Won in conference quarterfinals, 4–2 (Oilers); Lost in conference semifinals, 0–4 (Blues)
2001–02	2001–02	Western	Pacific	4th	82	36	28	13	5	90	215	213	—	—	—	—	—	Did not qualify
2002–03	2002–03	Western	Pacific↑	1st	82	46	17	15	4	111	245	169	12	6	6	34	25	Won in conference quarterfinals, 4–2 (Oilers); Lost in conference semifinals, 2–4 (Mighty Ducks)
2003–04	2003–04	Western	Pacific	2nd	82	41	26	13	2	97	194	175	5	1	4	10	19	Lost in conference quarterfinals, 1–4 (Avalanche)
2004–05^{2}	2004–05	Season cancelled due to 2004–05 NHL Lockout																
2005–06^{3}	2005–06	Western	Pacific↑	1st	82	53	23	—	6	112	253	217	5	1	4	15	18	Lost conference quarterfinals, 1–4 (Avalanche)
2006–07	2006–07	Western	Pacific	3rd	82	50	25	—	7	107	217	193	7	3	4	12	13	Lost in conference quarterfinals, 3–4 (Canucks)
2007–08	2007–08	Western	Pacific	3rd	82	45	30	—	7	97	237	204	18	10	8	45	41	Won in conference quarterfinals, 4–2 (Ducks); Won in conference semifinals, 4–2 (Sharks); Lost in conference finals, 2–4 (Red Wings)
2008–09	2008–09	Western	Pacific	3rd	82	36	35	—	11	83	224	251	—	—	—	—	—	Did not qualify
2009–10	2009–10	Western	Pacific	5th	82	37	31	—	14	88	230	244	—	—	—	—	—	Did not qualify
2010–11	2010–11	Western	Pacific	5th	82	42	29	—	11	95	222	226	—	—	—	—	—	Did not qualify
2011–12	2011–12	Western	Pacific	4th	82	42	35	—	5	89	204	218	—	—	—	—	—	Did not qualify
2012–13^{4}	2012–13	Western	Pacific	5th	48	22	22	—	4	48	128	141	—	—	—	—	—	Did not qualify
2013–14	2013–14	Western	Central	5th	82	40	31	—	11	91	231	223	6	2	4	18	20	Lost in first round, 2–4 (Ducks)
2014–15	2014–15	Western	Central	6th	82	41	31	—	10	92	257	257	—	—	—	—	—	Did not qualify
2015–16	2015–16	Western	Central↑	1st	82	50	23	—	9	109	265	228	13	7	6	35	42	Won in first round, 4–2 (Wild); Lost in second round, 3–4 (Blues)
2016–17	2016–17	Western	Central	6th	82	34	37	—	11	79	222	260	—	—	—	—	—	Did not qualify
2017–18	2017–18	Western	Central	6th	82	42	32	—	8	92	231	222	—	—	—	—	—	Did not qualify
2018–19	2018–19	Western	Central	4th	82	43	32	—	7	93	209	200	13	7	6	35	30	Won in first round, 4–2 (Predators); Lost in second round, 3–4 (Blues)
2019–20^{5}	2019–20	Western‡	Central	3rd	69	37	24	—	8	82	178	174	27	15	12	78	82	Finished third in seeding round-robin (1–2); Won in first round, 4–2 (Flames); Won in second round, 4–3 (Avalanche); Won in conference finals, 4–1 (Golden Knights); Lost in Stanley Cup Final, 2–4 (Lightning)
2020–21^{6}	2020–21	—	Central	5th	56	23	19	—	14	60	156	148	—	—	—	—	—	Did not qualify
2021–22	2021–22	Western	Central	4th	82	46	30	—	6	98	233	244	7	3	4	14	15	Lost in first round, 3–4 (Flames)
2022–23	2022–23	Western	Central	2nd	82	47	21	—	14	108	281	215	19	10	9	59	61	Won in first round, 4–2 (Wild); Won in second round, 4–3 (Kraken); Lost in conference finals, 2–4 (Golden Knights)
2023–24	2023–24	Western	Central↑	1st	82	52	21	—	9	113	294	232	19	10	9	52	48	Won in first round, 4–3 (Golden Knights); Won in second round, 4–2 (Avalanche); Lost in conference finals, 2–4 (Oilers)
2024–25	2024–25	Western	Central	2nd	82	50	26	—	6	106	275	222	18	9	9	45	60	Won in first round, 4–3 (Avalanche); Won in second round, 4–2 (Jets); Lost in conference finals, 1–4 (Oilers)
2025–26	2025–26	Western	Central	2nd	82	50	20	—	12	112	273	222	6	2	4	15	23	Lost in first round, 2–4 (Wild)
Totals					2,519	1,329	856	125	209	2,992	7,399	6,757	269	139	130	696	711	21 playoff appearances

^{1} Season was shortened due to the 1994–95 NHL lockout.
^{2} Season was cancelled due to the 2004–05 NHL lockout.
^{3} As of the 2005–06 NHL season, all games tied after overtime will be decided in a shootout; SOL (Shootout losses) will be recorded as OTL in the standings.
^{4} Season was shortened due to the 2012–13 NHL lockout.
^{5} Season was suspended on March 12, 2020 due to the COVID-19 pandemic.
^{6} Due to the COVID-19 pandemic, the 2020–21 NHL season was shortened to 56 games.

=== All-time records ===
Statistic	GP	W	L	T	OT
Regular season record (1993–present)	2,519	1,329	856	125	209
Postseason record (1993–present)	269	139	130	—	—
All-time regular and postseason record	2,788	1,468	986	125	209
All-time series record: 25–20
