= List of Carolina Hurricanes minor league affiliates =

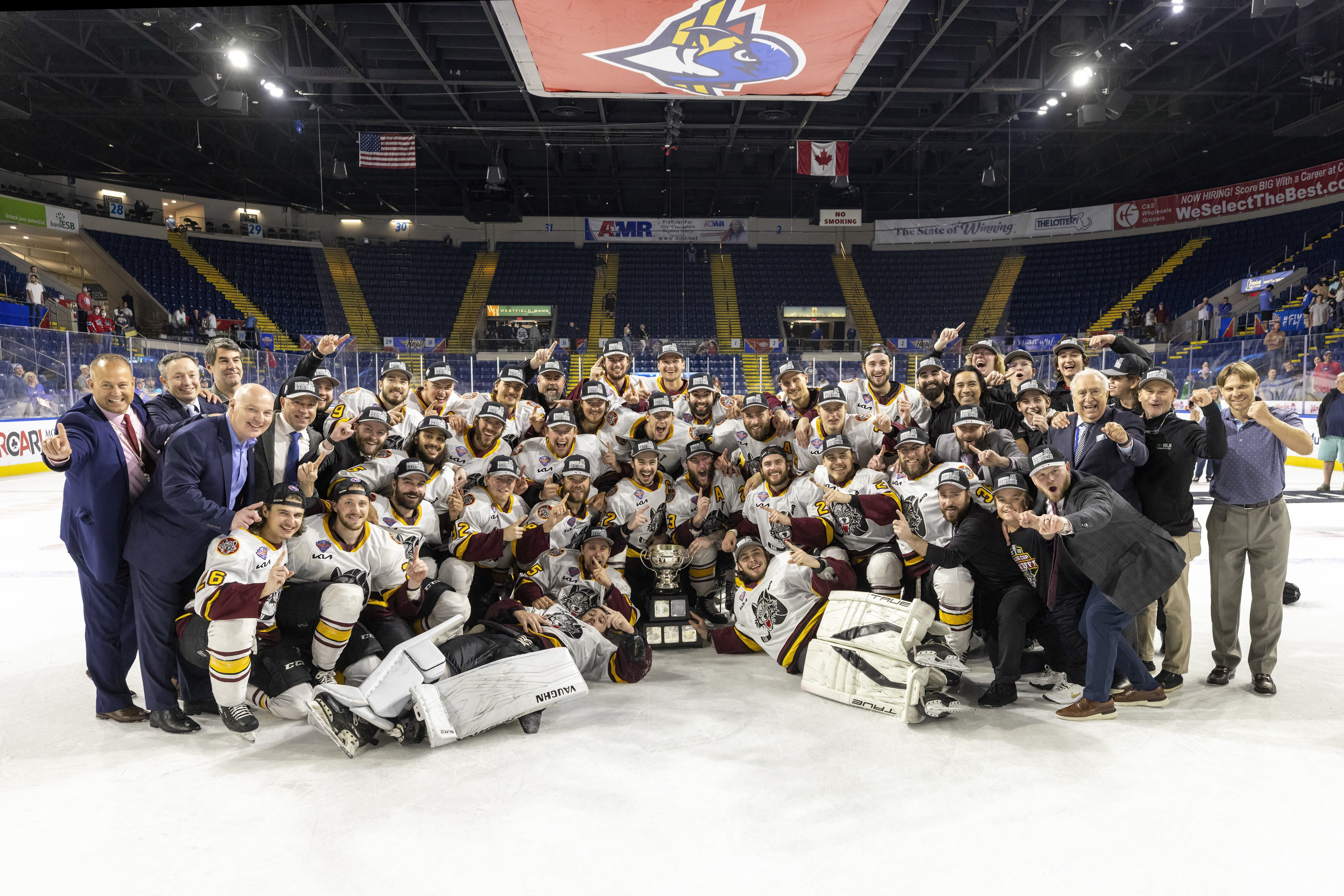
2021–22 Wolves with the Calder Cup

This is a list of all-time minor league affiliates for the Carolina Hurricanes of the National Hockey League (NHL). The Hurricanes have been affiliated with the Chicago Wolves of the American Hockey League (AHL) since the 2020–21 season (Note: There was no affiliation during the 2023-34 season.), and the Greensboro Gargoyles of the ECHL since the 2025–26 season. Florida Everblades had the longest affiliation with 18 seasons.

== Affiliates ==
^{†} Calder Cup champions
^{‡} League champions

Season	AHL affiliate	Other affiliates	
Season	AHL affiliate	Team	League
1997–98	New Haven Beast	Richmond Renegades	ECHL
1998–99	New Haven Beast		
1999–00		Cincinnati Cyclones	IHL
2000–01		Cincinnati Cyclones	IHL
2001–02	Lowell Lock Monsters	Florida Everblades	ECHL
2001–02	Lowell Lock Monsters	Greensboro Generals	ECHL
2002–03	Lowell Lock Monsters	Florida Everblades	ECHL
2003–04	Lowell Lock Monsters	Florida Everblades	ECHL
2004–05	Lowell Lock Monsters	Florida Everblades	ECHL
2005–06	Lowell Lock Monsters	Florida Everblades	ECHL
2006–07	Albany River Rats	Florida Everblades	ECHL
2007–08	Albany River Rats	Florida Everblades	ECHL
2008–09	Albany River Rats	Florida Everblades	ECHL
2009–10	Albany River Rats	Florida Everblades	ECHL
2010–11	Charlotte Checkers	Florida Everblades	ECHL
2011–12	Charlotte Checkers	Florida Everblades^{‡}	ECHL
2012–13	Charlotte Checkers	Florida Everblades	ECHL
2013–14	Charlotte Checkers	Florida Everblades	ECHL
2014–15	Charlotte Checkers	Florida Everblades	ECHL
2015–16	Charlotte Checkers	Florida Everblades	ECHL
2016–17	Charlotte Checkers	Florida Everblades	ECHL
2017–18	Charlotte Checkers	Florida Everblades	ECHL
2018–19	Charlotte Checkers^{†}	Florida Everblades	ECHL
2019–20	Charlotte Checkers	Greenville Swamp Rabbits	ECHL
2020–21	Chicago Wolves	Norfolk Admirals	ECHL
2021–22	Chicago Wolves^{†}	Norfolk Admirals	ECHL
2022–23	Chicago Wolves	Norfolk Admirals	ECHL
2023–24	(Note: The Hurricanes did not have any official affiliates during the 2023-24 season. There was a working agreement with Norfolk Admirals.)		
2024–25	Chicago Wolves		
2025–26	Chicago Wolves	Greensboro Gargoyles	ECHL

== See also ==
- Farm team
