= List of Columbus Blue Jackets seasons =

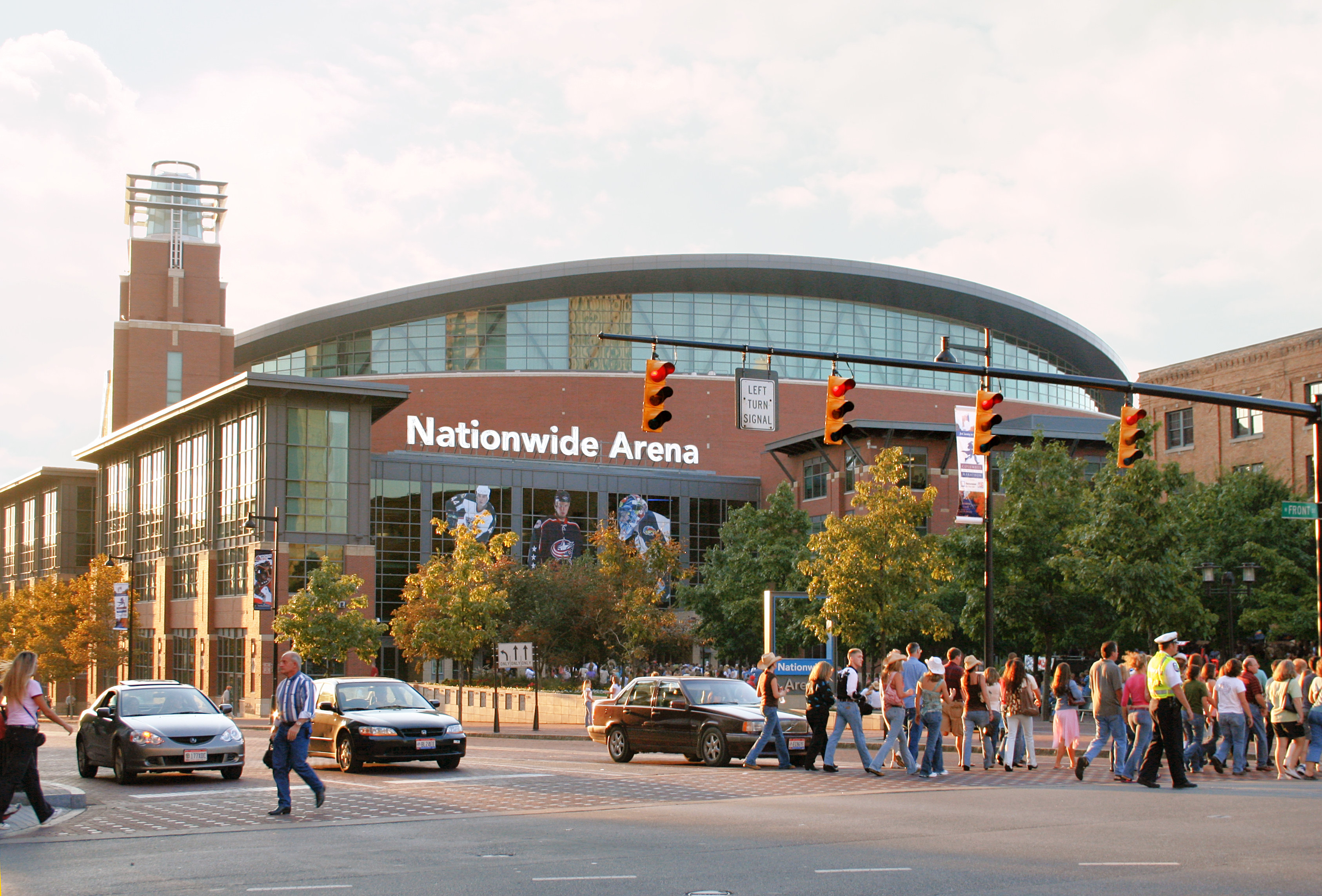
Nationwide Arena, home of the Columbus Blue Jackets.

The Columbus Blue Jackets are a professional ice hockey team based in Columbus, Ohio. The team is a member of the Metropolitan Division of the Eastern Conference of the National Hockey League (NHL).

== Table key ==
Key of colors and symbols
Color/symbol	Explanation
†	Stanley Cup champions
‡	Conference champions
↑	Division champions
#	Led league in points

Key of terms and abbreviations
Term or abbreviation	Definition
Finish	Final position in division or league standings
GP	Number of games played
W	Number of wins
L	Number of losses
T	Number of ties
OT	Number of losses in overtime (since the 1999–2000 season)
Pts	Number of points
GF	Goals for (goals scored by the Blue Jackets)
GA	Goals against (goals scored by the Blue Jackets' opponents)
—	Does not apply

== Year by year ==
Season	Blue Jackets season	Conference	Division	Regular season									Postseason					
Season	Blue Jackets season	Conference	Division	Finish	GP	W	L	T	OTL (Note: As of the 2005–06 NHL season, all games will have a winner; the OTL column includes SOL (shootout losses).)	Pts	GF	GA	GP	W	L	GF	GA	Result
2000–01	2000–01	Western	Central	5th	82	28	39	9	6	71	190	233	—	—	—	—	—	Did not qualify
2001–02	2001–02	Western	Central	5th	82	22	47	8	5	57	164	255	—	—	—	—	—	Did not qualify
2002–03	2002–03	Western	Central	5th	82	29	42	8	3	69	213	263	—	—	—	—	—	Did not qualify
2003–04	2003–04	Western	Central	4th	82	25	45	8	4	62	177	238	—	—	—	—	—	Did not qualify
2004–05 (Note: The season was cancelled because of the 2004–05 NHL lockout.)	2004–05	Season not played due to lockout																
2005–06	2005–06	Western	Central	3rd	82	35	43	—	4	74	215	276	—	—	—	—	—	Did not qualify
2006–07	2006–07	Western	Central	4th	82	33	42	—	7	73	196	244	—	—	—	—	—	Did not qualify
2007–08	2007–08	Western	Central	4th	82	34	36	—	12	80	190	210	—	—	—	—	—	Did not qualify
2008–09	2008–09	Western	Central	4th	82	41	31	—	10	92	220	223	4	0	4	7	18	Lost in conference quarterfinals, 0–4 (Red Wings)
2009–10	2009–10	Western	Central	5th	82	32	35	—	15	79	214	249	—	—	—	—	—	Did not qualify
2010–11	2010–11	Western	Central	5th	82	34	35	—	13	81	210	250	—	—	—	—	—	Did not qualify
2011–12	2011–12	Western	Central	5th	82	29	46	—	7	65	198	257	—	—	—	—	—	Did not qualify
2012–13 (Note: The season was shortened to 48 games because of the 2012–13 NHL lockout.)	2012–13	Western	Central	4th	48	24	17	—	7	55	115	115	—	—	—	—	—	Did not qualify
2013–14	2013–14 (Note: The NHL realigned prior to the 2013–14 season. The Blue Jackets were placed in the Metropolitan Division of the Eastern Conference.)	Eastern	Metropolitan	4th	82	43	32	—	7	93	226	214	6	2	4	18	21	Lost in first round, 2–4 (Penguins)
2014–15	2014–15	Eastern	Metropolitan	5th	82	42	35	—	5	89	227	248	—	—	—	—	—	Did not qualify
2015–16	2015–16	Eastern	Metropolitan	8th	82	34	40	—	8	76	213	248	—	—	—	—	—	Did not qualify
2016–17	2016–17	Eastern	Metropolitan	3rd	82	50	24	—	8	108	247	193	5	1	4	13	21	Lost in first round, 1–4 (Penguins)
2017–18	2017–18	Eastern	Metropolitan	4th	82	45	30	—	7	97	236	226	6	2	4	18	24	Lost in first round, 2–4 (Capitals)
2018–19	2018–19	Eastern	Metropolitan	5th	82	47	31	—	4	98	256	231	10	6	4	30	25	Won in first round, 4–0 (Lightning); Lost in second round, 2–4 (Bruins)
2019–20 (Note: The season was suspended on March 12, 2020, because of the COVID-19 pandemic. The top 24 teams in the league qualified for the playoffs.)	2019–20	Eastern	Metropolitan	6th	70	33	22	—	15	81	180	183	10	4	6	24	24	Won in qualifying round, 3–2 (Maple Leafs); Lost in first round, 1–4 (Lightning)
2020–21 (Note: Due to the COVID-19 pandemic, the 2020–21 NHL season was shortened to 56 games.)	2020–21	—	Central	8th	56	18	26	—	12	48	134	184	—	—	—	—	—	Did not qualify
2021–22	2021–22	Eastern	Metropolitan	6th	82	37	38	—	7	81	258	297	—	—	—	—	—	Did not qualify
2022–23	2022–23	Eastern	Metropolitan	8th	82	25	48	—	9	59	213	329	—	—	—	—	—	Did not qualify
2023–24	2023–24	Eastern	Metropolitan	8th	82	27	43	—	12	66	234	298	—	—	—	—	—	Did not qualify
2024–25	2024–25	Eastern	Metropolitan	4th	82	40	33	—	9	89	267	267	—	—	—	—	—	Did not qualify
2025–26	2025–26	Eastern	Metropolitan	5th	82	40	30	—	12	92	246	251	—	—	—	—	—	Did not qualify
Totals					1,978	847	890	33	208	1,935	5,331	6,063	41	15	26	110	133	6 playoff appearances

=== All-time records ===
Statistic	GP	W	L	T	OT
Regular season record (2000–present)	1,978	847	890	33	208
Postseason record (2000–present)	41	15	26	—	—
All-time regular and postseason record	2,019	862	916	33	208
All-time series record: 2–6
