= List of Hartford Whalers seasons =

This is a list of seasons completed by the Hartford Whalers of the World Hockey Association (WHA) and National Hockey League (NHL) . This list documents the records and playoff results for all 25 seasons that the Whalers completed from their founding in 1972 (then known as the New England Whalers) in the WHA until the franchise relocated to Greensboro, North Carolina, and eventually Raleigh to become the Carolina Hurricanes in 1997.

== Season-by-season record ==
=== WHA era ===
Avco World Trophy champions	Division/reg. season champions	League leader

New England Whalers Note: GP = Games played, W = Wins, L = Losses, T = Ties, Pts = Points, GF = Goals for, GA = Goals against

Season	Team season	GP	W	L	T	Pts	GF	GA	Finish	Playoffs
1972–73	1972–73	78	46	30	2	94	318	263	1st, Eastern	Won quarterfinals, 4–1 (Nationals); Won semifinals, 4–1 (Crusaders); Won Avco Cup final, 4–1 (Jets)
1973–74	1973–74	78	43	31	4	90	291	260	1st, Eastern	Lost quarterfinals, 3–4 (Cougars)
1974–75	1974–75	78	43	30	5	91	274	279	1st, Eastern	Lost quarterfinals, 2–4 (Fighting Saints)
1975–76	1975–76	80	33	40	7	73	255	290	3rd, Eastern	Won preliminary round, 3–0 (Crusaders); Won quarterfinals, 4–3 (Racers); Lost semifinals, 3–4 (Aeros)
1976–77	1976–77	81	35	40	6	76	275	290	4th, Eastern	Lost quarterfinals, 1–4 (Nordiques)
1977–78	1977–78	80	44	31	5	93	335	269	2nd, WHA	Won quarterfinals, 4–1 (Oilers); Won semifinals, 4–1 (Nordiques); Lost Avco Cup final, 0–4 (Jets)
1978–79	1978–79	80	37	34	9	83	298	287	4th, WHA	Won quarterfinals, 2–1 (Stingers); Lost semifinals, 3–4 (Oilers)
WHA totals		555	281	236	38	600	2,046	1,938		7 playoff appearances

=== NHL era ===
Key of colors and symbols
Color/symbol	Explanation
↑	Division champions

Key of terms and abbreviations
Term or abbreviation	Definition
Finish	Final position in division or league standings
GP	Number of games played
W	Number of wins
L	Number of losses
T	Number of ties
Pts	Number of points
GF	Goals for (goals scored by the Whalers)
GA	Goals against (goals scored by the Whalers' opponents)
—	Does not apply

Season	Team season	Conference	Division	Regular season (Note: Code explanation; GP—Games played, W—Wins, L—Losses, GF—Goals for, GA—Goals against, Pts—Points)								Postseason (Note: The result of the playoff series shows the Whalers' result first regardless of the outcome, followed by the opposing team in parentheses.)					
Season	Team season	Conference	Division	Finish	GP	W	L	T	Pts	GF	GA	GP	W	L	GF	GA	Result
1979–80	1979–80	Wales	Norris	4th	80	27	34	19	73	303	372	3	0	3	7	18	Lost in preliminary round, 0–3 (Canadiens)
1980–81	1980–81	Wales	Norris	4th	80	21	41	18	60	292	372	Did not qualify					
1981–82	1981–82	Wales	Adams	5th	80	21	41	18	60	264	351	Did not qualify					
1982–83	1982–83	Wales	Adams	5th	80	19	54	7	45	261	403	Did not qualify					
1983–84	1983–84	Wales	Adams	5th	80	28	42	10	66	288	320	Did not qualify					
1984–85	1984–85	Wales	Adams	5th	80	30	41	9	69	268	318	Did not qualify					
1985–86	1985–86	Wales	Adams	4th	80	40	36	4	84	332	302	10	6	4	29	23	Won in division semifinals, 3–0 (Nordiques); Lost in division finals, 3–4 (Canadiens)
1986–87	1986–87	Wales	Adams ↑	1st	80	43	30	7	93	287	270	6	2	4	19	27	Lost in division semifinals, 2–4 (Nordiques)
1987–88	1987–88	Wales	Adams	4th	80	35	38	7	77	249	267	6	2	4	20	23	Lost in division semifinals, 2–4 (Canadiens)
1988–89	1988–89	Wales	Adams	4th	80	37	38	5	79	299	290	4	0	4	11	18	Lost in division semifinals, 0–4 (Canadiens)
1989–90	1989–90	Wales	Adams	4th	80	38	33	9	85	275	268	7	3	4	21	23	Lost in division semifinals, 3–4 (Bruins)
1990–91	1990–91	Wales	Adams	4th	80	31	38	11	73	238	276	6	2	4	17	24	Lost in division semifinals, 2–4 (Bruins)
1991–92	1991–92	Wales	Adams	4th	80	26	41	13	65	247	283	7	3	4	17	22	Lost in division semifinals, 3–4 (Canadiens)
1992–93	1992–93	Wales	Adams	5th	84	26	52	6	58	284	369	Did not qualify					
1993–94	1993–94	Eastern	Northeast	6th	84	27	48	9	63	227	288	Did not qualify					
1994–95 (Note: Season was shortened due to the 1994–95 NHL lockout.)	1994–95	Eastern	Northeast	5th	48	19	24	5	43	127	141	Did not qualify					
1995–96	1995–96	Eastern	Northeast	4th	82	34	39	9	77	237	259	Did not qualify					
1996–97	1996–97	Eastern	Northeast	5th	82	32	39	11	75	226	256	Did not qualify					
Relocated to Carolina
Totals (Note: Totals as of the completion of the 1996–97 regular season)					1,420	534	709	177	1,245	4,704	5,345	49	18	31	141	178	8 playoff appearances

== See also ==
- List of Carolina Hurricanes seasons
