= 2004–05 NHL transactions =

The following is a list of all team-to-team transactions that occurred in the National Hockey League during the 2004–05 NHL season. It lists, by date, the team each player has been traded to, signed by, or claimed by, and for which players or draft picks, if applicable.

== Trades ==
=== July ===
July 6, 2004	To Phoenix Coyotes 4th-round pick in 2005 (PHI - #119 - Jeremy Duchesne)^{1}	To Columbus Blue Jackets Radoslav Suchy; 6th-round pick in 2005 (#177 - Derek Reinhart)

1. Phoenix's acquired fourth-round pick went to Philadelphia as the result of a trade on July 30, 2005 that sent a second-round pick in the 2005 entry draft to Phoenix in exchange for a second-round pick in the 2006 entry draft and this pick.

=== August ===
August 16, 2004	To Mighty Ducks of Anaheim 2nd-round pick in 2005 (#31 - Brendan Mikkelson)	To Tampa Bay Lightning Vaclav Prospal
August 26, 2004	To Phoenix Coyotes Denis Gauthier; Oleg Saprykin	To Calgary Flames Daymond Langkow

=== November ===
November 14, 2004	To Phoenix Coyotes loan of Peter White	To Philadelphia Flyers loan of Jon Sim

== See also ==
- 2004 NHL entry draft
- 2004 in sports
- 2005 in sports
