= List of Minnesota North Stars seasons =

This is a list of seasons completed by the Minnesota North Stars of the National Hockey League. This list documents the records and playoff results for all seasons the North Stars completed before they moved to Dallas after the 1992–93 season as the Dallas Stars. For records after 1993, see List of Dallas Stars seasons.

Key of colors and symbols
Color/symbol	Explanation
‡	Conference champions
↑	Division champions

Key of terms and abbreviations
Term or abbreviation	Definition
Finish	Final position in division or league standings
GP	Number of games played
W	Number of wins
L	Number of losses
T	Number of ties
Pts	Number of points
GF	Goals for (goals scored by the North Stars)
GA	Goals against (goals scored by the North Stars' opponents)
—	Does not apply

Season	Team season	Conference	Division	Regular season								Postseason					
Season	Team season	Conference	Division	Finish	GP	W	L	T	Pts	GF	GA	GP	W	L	GF	GA	Result
1967–68	1967–68	—	West	4th	74	27	32	15	69	191	226	14	7	7	48	39	Won in quarterfinals, 4–3 (Kings); Lost in semifinals, 3–4 (Blues)
1968–69	1968–69	—	West	6th	76	18	43	15	51	189	270	Did not qualify					
1969–70	1969–70	—	West	3rd	76	19	35	22	60	224	257	6	2	4	16	20	Lost in quarterfinals, 2–4 (Blues)
1970–71	1970–71	—	West	4th	78	28	34	16	72	191	223	12	6	6	35	42	Won in quarterfinals, 4-2 (Blues); Lost in semifinals, 2-4 (Canadiens)
1971–72	1971–72	—	West	2nd	78	37	29	12	86	212	191	7	3	4	19	19	Lost in quarterfinals, 3–4 (Blues)
1972–73	1972–73	—	West	3rd	78	37	30	11	85	254	230	6	2	4	12	14	Lost in quarterfinals, 2–4 (Flyers)
1973–74	1973–74	—	West	7th	78	23	38	17	63	235	275	Did not qualify					
1974–75	1974–75	Campbell	Smythe	4th	80	23	50	7	53	221	341	Did not qualify					
1975–76	1975–76	Campbell	Smythe	4th	80	20	53	7	47	195	303	Did not qualify					
1976–77	1976–77	Campbell	Smythe	2nd	80	23	39	18	64	240	310	2	0	2	3	11	Lost in preliminary round, 0–2 (Sabres)
1977–78	1977–78	Campbell	Smythe	5th	80	18	53	9	45	218	325	Did not qualify					
Merged with the Cleveland Barons
1978–79	1978–79	Wales	Adams	4th	80	28	40	12	68	257	289	Did not qualify					
1979–80	1979–80	Wales	Adams	3rd	80	36	28	16	88	311	253	15	8	7	49	56	Won in preliminary round, 3–0 (Maple Leafs); Won in quarterfinals, 4–3 (Canadiens); Lost in semifinals, 1–4 (Flyers)
1980–81	1980–81	Wales	Adams	3rd	80	35	28	17	87	291	263	19	12	7	49	56	Won in preliminary round, 3–0 (Bruins); Won in quarterfinals, 4–1 (Sabres); Won in semifinals, 4–2 (Flames); Lost in Stanley Cup Final, 1–4 (Islanders)
1981–82	1981–82	Campbell	Norris ↑	1st	80	37	23	20	94	346	288	4	1	3	14	14	Lost in division semifinals, 1–3 (Black Hawks)
1982–83	1982–83	Campbell	Norris	2nd	80	40	24	16	96	321	290	9	4	5	32	32	Won in division semifinals, 3–1 (Maple Leafs); Lost in division finals, 1–4 (Black Hawks)
1983–84	1983–84	Campbell	Norris ↑	1st	80	39	31	10	88	345	344	16	7	9	47	53	Won in division semifinals, 3–2 (Black Hawks); Won in division finals, 4–3 (Blues); Lost in Conference finals, 0–4 (Oilers)
1984–85	1984–85	Campbell	Norris	4th	80	25	43	12	62	268	321	9	5	4	38	38	Won in division semifinals, 3–0 (Blues); Lost in division finals, 2–4 (Black Hawks)
1985–86	1985–86	Campbell	Norris	2nd	80	38	33	9	85	327	305	5	2	3	20	18	Lost in division semifinals, 2–3 (Blues)
1986–87	1986–87	Campbell	Norris	5th	80	30	40	10	70	296	314	Did not qualify					
1987–88	1987–88	Campbell	Norris	5th	80	19	48	13	51	242	349	Did not qualify					
1988–89	1988–89	Campbell	Norris	3rd	80	27	37	16	70	258	278	4	1	3	20	18	Lost in division semifinals, 1–4 (Blues)
1989–90	1989–90	Campbell	Norris	4th	80	36	40	4	76	284	291	7	3	4	18	21	Lost in division semifinals, 3–4 (Blackhawks)
1990–91	1990–91	Campbell‡	Norris	4th	80	27	39	14	68	256	266	23	14	9	75	73	Won in division semifinals, 4–2 (Blackhawks); Won in division finals, 4–2 (Blues); Won in Conference finals, 4–1 (Oilers); Lost in Stanley Cup Final, 2–4 (Penguins)
1991–92	1991–92	Campbell	Norris	4th	80	32	42	6	70	246	278	7	3	4	19	23	Lost in division semifinals, 3–4 (Red Wings)
1992–93	1992–93	Campbell	Norris	5th	84	36	38	10	82	272	293	Did not qualify					
Relocated to Dallas
Totals					2,062	758	970	334	1,850	6,690	7,333	155	80	88	536	477	17 playoff appearances
