= 2004–05 Carolina Hurricanes season =

National Hockey League team season

2004–05 Carolina Hurricanes
- Division: Southeast
- Conference: Eastern
- 2004–05 record: Did not play

Team information
- General manager: Jim Rutherford
- Coach: Peter Laviolette
- Captain: Vacant
- Arena: RBC Center
- Minor league affiliates: Lowell Lock Monsters; Florida Everblades

The 2004–05 Carolina Hurricanes season was cancelled due to the lockout of the players of the National Hockey League (NHL).

== Schedule ==
The Hurricanes preseason and regular season schedules were announced on July 14, 2004.

2004–05 schedule
Preseason

Game	Date	Opponent
1	September 25	@ Tampa Bay Lightning
2	September 27	@ Florida Panthers
3	September 28	@ Tampa Bay Lightning
4	September 29	@ Atlanta Thrashers
5	October 1	Florida Panthers
6	October 3	Atlanta Thrashers
7	October 8	Washington Capitals
8	October 9	@ Washington Capitals

Regular season

Game	Date	Opponent
1	October 14	Atlanta Thrashers
2	October 16	@ New York Islanders
3	October 20	@ Detroit Red Wings
4	October 21	@ Philadelphia Flyers
5	October 26	@ Montreal Canadiens
6	October 27	Ottawa Senators
7	October 29	Toronto Maple Leafs
8	October 31	Chicago Blackhawks
9	November 4	@ Tampa Bay Lightning
10	November 5	Montreal Canadiens
11	November 7	Minnesota Wild
12	November 10	Dallas Stars
13	November 12	Atlanta Thrashers
14	November 14	Calgary Flames
15	November 17	@ Buffalo Sabres
16	November 19	@ Philadelphia Flyers
17	November 20	Buffalo Sabres
18	November 24	New York Rangers
19	November 27	Tampa Bay Lightning
20	November 28	Vancouver Canucks
21	December 1	Boston Bruins
22	December 3	Pittsburgh Penguins
23	December 4	@ New York Islanders
24	December 8	@ Anaheim Mighty Ducks
25	December 9	@ Los Angeles Kings
26	December 11	@ San Jose Sharks
27	December 15	@ Atlanta Thrashers
28	December 17	@ Florida Panthers
29	December 18	Atlanta Thrashers
30	December 21	New Jersey Devils
31	December 23	Toronto Maple Leafs
32	December 26	Florida Panthers
33	December 27	@ Atlanta Thrashers
34	December 30	@ Ottawa Senators
35	December 31	New York Islanders
36	January 5	@ Washington Capitals
37	January 7	Columbus Blue Jackets
38	January 8	@ Nashville Predators
39	January 11	@ Montreal Canadiens
40	January 13	@ Buffalo Sabres
41	January 14	Philadelphia Flyers
42	January 17	Washington Capitals
43	January 21	Tampa Bay Lightning
44	January 22	@ New Jersey Devils
45	January 24	@ Toronto Maple Leafs
46	January 26	@ Pittsburgh Penguins
47	January 28	Ottawa Senators
48	January 29	@ Florida Panthers
49	January 31	Phoenix Coyotes
50	February 2	@ Atlanta Thrashers
51	February 3	@ St. Louis Blues
52	February 5	@ Phoenix Coyotes
53	February 7	@ Colorado Avalanche
54	February 9	New York Islanders
55	February 10	@ Ottawa Senators
56	February 15	@ Toronto Maple Leafs
57	February 18	Pittsburgh Penguins
58	February 19	@ New Jersey Devils
59	February 21	Tampa Bay Lightning
60	February 23	Philadelphia Flyers
61	February 26	@ Washington Capitals
62	February 27	Washington Capitals
63	March 2	@ New York Rangers
64	March 4	@ Tampa Bay Lightning
65	March 6	@ Dallas Stars
66	March 7	Edmonton Oilers
67	March 10	Colorado Avalanche
68	March 12	Florida Panthers
69	March 15	Washington Capitals
70	March 17	Montreal Canadiens
71	March 19	@ Boston Bruins
72	March 22	@ New York Rangers
73	March 24	Boston Bruins
74	March 26	@ Pittsburgh Penguins
75	March 28	@ Boston Bruins
76	March 29	Buffalo Sabres
77	March 31	New Jersey Devils
78	April 2	New York Rangers
79	April 4	@ Washington Capitals
80	April 6	@ Tampa Bay Lightning
81	April 8	@ Florida Panthers
82	April 10	Florida Panthers

== Transactions ==
The Hurricanes were involved in the following transactions from June 8, 2004, the day after the deciding game of the 2004 Stanley Cup Finals, through February 16, 2005, the day the 2004–05 season was officially cancelled.

=== Trades ===
Date	Details		Ref
June 16, 2004	To Carolina Hurricanes: Future considerations	To Columbus Blue Jackets: Arturs Irbe	
June 18, 2004	To Carolina Hurricanes: Martin Gerber	To Mighty Ducks of Anaheim: Tomas Malec; 3rd-round pick in 2004	
June 26, 2004	To Carolina Hurricanes: 1st-round pick in 2004	To Columbus Blue Jackets: 1st-round pick in 2004; 2nd-round pick in 2004	
June 27, 2004	To Carolina Hurricanes: 3rd-round pick in 2005	To Atlanta Thrashers: 4th-round pick in 2004	
June 29, 2004	To Carolina Hurricanes: 4th-round pick in 2005	To Dallas Stars: Jaroslav Svoboda	

=== Players acquired ===
Date	Player	Former team	Term	Via	Ref
July 15, 2004	Frantisek Kaberle	Atlanta Thrashers	2-year	Free agency	
July 23, 2004	Jim Henkel	Providence Bruins (AHL)	1-year	Free agency	
August 5, 2004	Matt Cullen	Florida Panthers	1-year	Free agency	
August 11, 2004	Gordie Dwyer	Montreal Canadiens	1-year	Free agency	
August 11, 2004	Colin Forbes	Washington Capitals	1-year	Free agency	

=== Players lost ===
Date	Player	New team	Via (Note: In parentheses is the player’s free agency group on July 1 if applicable.)	Ref
July 1, 2004	Peter Reynolds (Note: Reynolds was inactive during the 2004–05 season.)		Contract expiration (UFA)	
July 15, 2004	Sean Hill	Florida Panthers	Free agency (III)	
July 28, 2004	Craig Adams	Milano Vipers (Serie A)	Free agency (UFA)	
August 2, 2004	Brad DeFauw	Vaxjo Lakers (Allsvenskan)	Free agency (VI)	
August 14, 2004	Brett Lysak	Iserlohn Roosters (DEL)	Free agency (UFA)	
August 25, 2004	Patrick DesRochers	Florida Panthers	Free agency (UFA)	
August 26, 2004	Kevin Weekes	New York Rangers	Free agency (UFA)	
September 17, 2004	Randy Petruk	Hartford Wolf Pack (AHL)	Free agency (VI)	
September 25, 2004	Tomas Kurka	HC Litvinov (ELH)	Free agency (UFA)	
September 29, 2004	Jamie Storr	Springfield Falcons (AHL)	Free agency (UFA)	
N/A	Damian Surma	Lowell Lock Monsters (AHL)	Free agency (UFA)	
February 19, 2005	Joey Tetarenko	Houston Aeros (AHL)	Free agency (VI)	

=== Signings ===
Date	Player	Term	Contract type	Ref
June 29, 2004	Jeff O'Neill	1-year	Re-signing	
July 1, 2004	Glen Wesley	1-year	Re-signing	
July 15, 2004	Martin Gerber	2-year	Re-signing	
July 15, 2004	Niclas Wallin	2-year	Re-signing	
July 22, 2004	Jesse Boulerice	1-year	Re-signing	
July 23, 2004	Erik Cole	1-year	Re-signing	
July 28, 2004	Kevyn Adams	1-year	Re-signing	
July 29, 2004	Justin Williams	1-year	Re-signing	
July 30, 2004	Pavel Brendl	1-year	Re-signing	
July 30, 2004	Allan Rourke	1-year	Re-signing	
July 30, 2004	Radim Vrbata	1-year	Re-signing	
August 2, 2004	Bruno St. Jacques	1-year	Re-signing	
August 6, 2004	Craig Kowalski	2-year	Entry-level	
August 6, 2004	Rob Zepp	1-year	Re-signing	
August 19, 2004	Michael Zigomanis	1-year	Re-signing	
September 15, 2004	Danny Richmond	3-year	Entry-level	

== Draft picks ==
Carolina's picks at the 2004 NHL entry draft, which was hosted by the Hurricanes at the RBC Center in Raleigh, North Carolina on June 26–27, 2004.

Round	Pick	Player	Position	Nationality	Team (league)
1	4	Andrew Ladd	Left wing	Canada	Calgary Hitmen (WHL)
2	38	Justin Peters	Goaltender	Canada	Toronto St. Michael's Majors (OHL)
3	69	Casey Borer	Defense	United States	St. Cloud State Huskies (WCHA)
4	109	Brett Carson	Defense	Canada	Calgary Hitmen (WHL)
5	137	Magnus Akerlund	Goaltender	Sweden	HV71 Jrs (Sweden)
7	202	Ryan Pottruff	Defense	Canada	London Knights (OHL)
8	235	Jonas Fiedler	Right wing	Czech Republic	Plymouth Whalers (OHL)
9	268	Martin Vagner	Defense	Czech Republic	Gatineau Olympiques (QMJHL)
