= Andrei Plekhanov =

Russian ice hockey player

- Born: July 12, 1986 (age 39) Nizhnekamsk, Soviet Union
- Height: 6 ft 2 in (188 cm)
- Weight: 206 lb (93 kg; 14 st 10 lb)
- Position: Defence
- Shot: Right
- Played for: HC Neftekhimik Nizhnekamsk; Syracuse Crunch; HC Dynamo Moscow; Amur Khabarovsk; HC Sibir Novosibirsk; HC Sochi; Admiral Vladivostok; HKM Zvolen
- NHL draft: 96th overall, 2004; Columbus Blue Jackets
- Playing career: 2004–2017

Andrei Plekhanov (born 12 July 1986) is a Russian former professional ice hockey defenseman. Plekhanov was drafted by the Columbus Blue Jackets in the third round with the 96th overall pick in the 2004 NHL entry draft.

== Playing career ==
He then came over to North America and signed with the Columbus Blue Jackets, skating for the club's AHL affiliate the Syracuse Crunch and ECHL affiliate Elmira Jackals during the 2007–08 season. The young defenseman re-signed to a one-way deal with the Blue Jackets for the 2008–09 season and signed in October 2009 for HC Dynamo Moscow.

== Career statistics ==
			Regular season					Playoffs
Season	Team	League	GP	G	A	Pts	PIM	GP	G	A	Pts	PIM
2001–02	Neftekhimik–2 Nizhnekamsk	RUS.3	41	1	12	13	36	—	—	—	—	—
2002–03	Neftekhimik–2 Nizhnekamsk	RUS.3	21	2	3	5	14	—	—	—	—	—
2003–04	Neftekhimik–2 Nizhnekamsk	RUS.3	14	4	6	10	12	—	—	—	—	—
2004–05	Neftekhimik Nizhnekamsk	RSL	2	0	0	0	2	—	—	—	—	—
2004–05	Neftekhimik–2 Nizhnekamsk	RUS.3	42	8	12	20	26	—	—	—	—	—
2004–05	Molot–Prikamye–2 Perm	RUS.3	2	0	0	0	4	—	—	—	—	—
2004–05	Neftyanik Leninogorsk	RUS.2	1	0	0	0	4	—	—	—	—	—
2005–06	Neftekhimik Nizhnekamsk	RSL	45	1	2	3	22	5	0	0	0	0
2005–06	Neftekhimik–2 Nizhnekamsk	RUS.3	4	0	0	0	2	—	—	—	—	—
2006–07	Neftekhimik Nizhnekamsk	RSL	16	1	2	3	28	—	—	—	—	—
2006–07	Neftekhimik–2 Nizhnekamsk	RUS.3	27	8	8	16	20	—	—	—	—	—
2007–08	Syracuse Crunch	AHL	40	9	16	25	10	8	1	2	3	2
2007–08	Elmira Jackals	ECHL	7	0	1	1	2	—	—	—	—	—
2008–09	Syracuse Crunch	AHL	54	2	16	18	50	—	—	—	—	—
2009–10	Dynamo Moscow	KHL	24	2	1	3	16	3	0	0	0	0
2010–11	Amur Khabarovsk	KHL	30	2	3	5	18	—	—	—	—	—
2011–12	Idaho Steelheads	ECHL	36	1	12	13	47	—	—	—	—	—
2012–13	Neftekhimik Nizhnekamsk	KHL	42	0	3	3	28	—	—	—	—	—
2013–14	Sibir Novosibirsk	KHL	22	0	1	1	12	4	0	1	1	2
2014–15	HC Sochi	KHL	9	0	3	3	0	—	—	—	—	—
2014–15	HC Kuban	VHL	3	0	0	0	0	—	—	—	—	—
2014–15	Saryarka Karagandy	VHL	18	2	3	5	12	12	1	2	3	6
2015–16	Admiral Vladivostok	KHL	4	0	0	0	0	—	—	—	—	—
2015–16	Sokol Krasnoyarsk	VHL	1	0	0	0	0	—	—	—	—	—
2015–16	Neftyanik Almetievsk	VHL	26	0	4	4	22	14	1	2	3	8
2016–17	HKm Zvolen	SVK	38	0	4	4	22	5	0	0	0	8
RUS.3 totals			151	23	41	64	114	—	—	—	—	—
RSL totals			63	2	4	6	52	5	0	0	0	0
KHL totals			131	4	11	15	74	7	0	1	1	2
