= Lukáš Vomela =

Czech ice hockey defenceman

- Born: September 25, 1985 (age 40) České Budějovice, Czechoslovakia
- Height: 6 ft 4 in (193 cm)
- Weight: 192 lb (87 kg; 13 st 10 lb)
- Position: Defence
- Shot: Right
- Played for: HC České Budějovice; HC Slavia Praha; HC Sparta Praha
- NHL draft: 248th overall, 2004; Dallas Stars
- Playing career: 2003–2016

Lukáš Vomela (born September 25, 1985) is a Czech former professional ice hockey defenceman.

Vomela was drafted 248th overall by the Dallas Stars in the 2004 NHL entry draft. He played a total of 23 games in the Czech Extraliga, playing for HC České Budějovice, HC Slavia Praha and HC Sparta Praha.

Vomela played in the 2003 IIHF World U18 Championships for the Czech Republic.

== Career statistics ==
=== Regular season and playoffs ===
			Regular season					Playoffs
Season	Team	League	GP	G	A	Pts	PIM	GP	G	A	Pts	PIM
1999–2000	HC České Budějovice	CZE U18	7	0	0	0	0	—	—	—	—	—
2000–01	HC České Budějovice	CZE U18	28	0	1	1	4	—	—	—	—	—
2001–02	HC České Budějovice	CZE U18	47	9	9	18	87	—	—	—	—	—
2001–02	HC České Budějovice	CZE U20	1	0	0	0	0	—	—	—	—	—
2002–03	HC České Budějovice	CZE U20	48	2	3	5	44	—	—	—	—	—
2003–04	HC České Budějovice	CZE U20	21	1	7	8	8	—	—	—	—	—
2003–04	HC České Budějovice	ELH	15	0	1	1	8	—	—	—	—	—
2004–05	HC České Budějovice	CZE U20	49	4	18	22	22	2	0	1	1	4
2004–05	HC České Budějovice	CZE.2	2	0	0	0	0	—	—	—	—	—
2004–05	KLH Vajgar Jindřichův Hradec	CZE.3	3	0	2	2	0	2	0	1	1	0
2005–06	HC České Budějovice	ELH	1	0	0	0	0	—	—	—	—	—
2005–06	KLH Vajgar Jindřichův Hradec	CZE.2	33	1	2	3	26	—	—	—	—	—
2006–07	HC Slavia Praha	ELH	5	0	0	0	2	—	—	—	—	—
2006–07	HC Sparta Praha	ELH	1	0	0	0	0	—	—	—	—	—
2006–07	SK Horácká Slavia Třebíč	CZE.2	36	2	5	7	91	2	0	0	0	2
2007–08	HK Jestřábi Prostějov	CZE.2	28	1	2	3	42	—	—	—	—	—
2007–08	HC Vrchlabí	CZE.2	6	0	2	2	4	9	0	2	2	6
2008–09	HC Tábor	CZE.3	20	0	2	2	12	13	1	2	3	8
2008–09	HC Česká Lípa	CZE.3	12	2	3	5	14	—	—	—	—	—
2009–10	HC Tábor	CZE.2	15	1	1	2	10	—	—	—	—	—
2009–10	HC Spartak Pelhřimov	CZE.3	10	2	0	2	36	—	—	—	—	—
2009–10	IHC KOMTERM Písek	CZE.3	3	1	1	2	2	4	0	1	1	4
2010–11	IHC KOMTERM Písek	CZE.2	27	0	2	2	8	—	—	—	—	—
2011–12	David Servis České Budějovice	CZE.4	18	5	4	9	12	8	2	2	4	8
2012–13	David Servis České Budějovice	CZE.4	21	9	10	19	38	8	1	1	2	40
2013–14	David Servis České Budějovice	CZE.4	22	5	4	9	41	11	1	5	6	4
2014–15	David Servis České Budějovice	CZE.4	18	7	12	19	10	8	1	5	6	16
2015–16	David Servis České Budějovice	CZE.4	17	2	10	12		4	0	1	1
ELH totals			23	0	1	1	14	—	—	—	—	—
CZE.2 totals			147	5	14	19	181	11	0	2	2	8
CZE.4 totals			96	28	40	68	101	39	5	14	19	68

=== International ===
Year	Team	Event	GP	G	A	Pts	PIM
2003	Czech Republic	WJC18	6	0	1	1	6
Junior totals			6	0	1	1	6
