= 2004–05 NHL season =

Canceled National Hockey League season

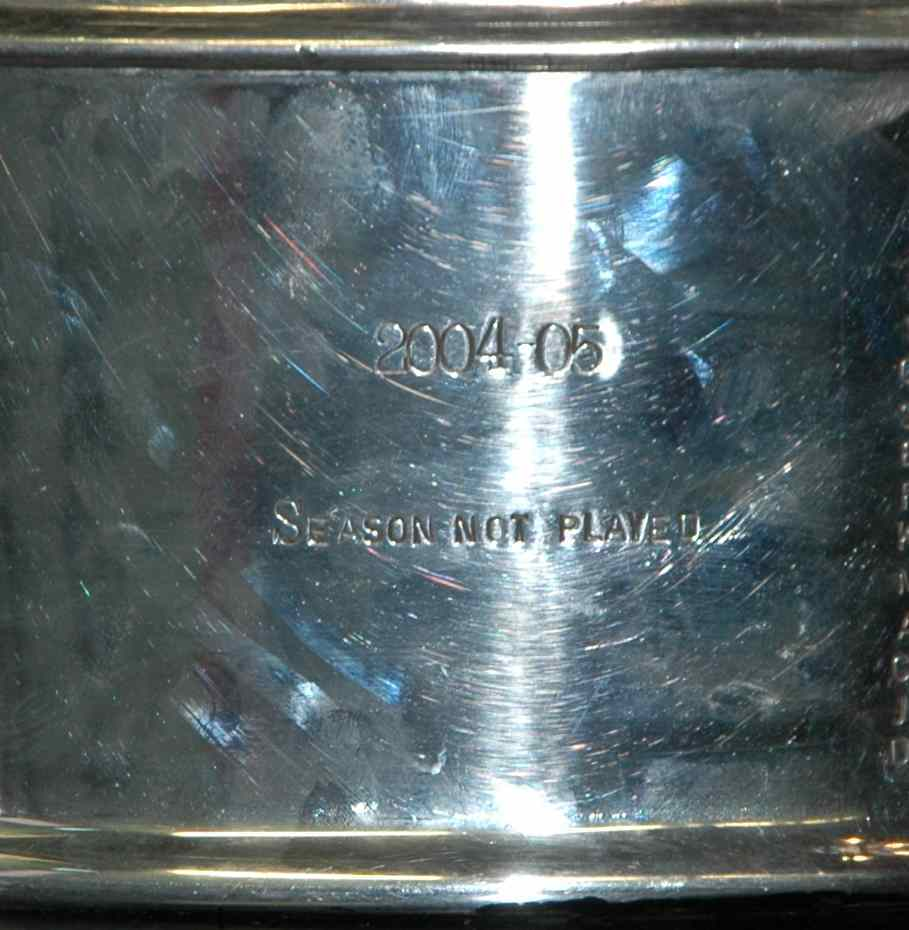
- The Stanley Cup acknowledges the canceled 2004–05 season with the words, "2004–05 Season Not Played"
- League: National Hockey League
- Sport: Ice hockey
- Games: 0
- Teams: 30
- TV partner(s): CBC, TSN, RDS (Canada); ESPN, (Note: See § Broadcasting rights) NBC (United States)

Draft
- Top draft pick: Alexander Ovechkin
- Picked by: Washington Capitals

Stanley Cup
- Champions: Not awarded due to an unresolved lockout

NHL seasons
- 2003–04 2005–06

The 2004–05 NHL season would have been the National Hockey League's 88th season of play. The entire 1,230-game schedule, that was set to begin in October, was officially canceled on February 16, 2005, due to an unresolved lockout that began on September 16, 2004. The loss of the 2004–05 season's games made the NHL the second North American professional sports league to lose an entire postseason of games because of a labor dispute, the first being the 1994–95 MLB strike. It was the first time since 1919, when the Spanish flu pandemic canceled the finals, that the Stanley Cup was not awarded. This canceled season was later acknowledged with the words "2004–05 Season Not Played" engraved on the Cup.

According to the International Ice Hockey Federation, 388 NHL players were on teams overseas at some point during the season, spread across 19 European leagues. Many of these players had a contract clause to return to the NHL when the league started up again, even if it was during the current season.

Key rule changes which would dominate after the lockout were established as a result of a meeting between the NHL and its top minor league, the American Hockey League. On July 5, 2004, the AHL announced publicly the 2004–05 rule changes, many of which were passed as a result of the NHL's recommendation for experimentation.

== Entry draft ==
The 2004 NHL entry draft, the last NHL event to take place before the lockout, was held on June 26 and 27, 2004 at the RBC Center in Raleigh, North Carolina. Alexander Ovechkin was selected first overall by the Washington Capitals.

== Lockout ==
On September 16, 2004, the NHL initiated a lockout of the National Hockey League Players' Association (NHLPA) after the existing NHL collective bargaining agreement (CBA) expired one day earlier. The action marked the third labour dispute between the league and the NHLPA in twelve years, following the 1992 strike and the 1994–95 lockout. The league attempted to convince the players to accept a salary cap to limit expenditure on player salaries, linking the cap to league revenues and thus guaranteeing the clubs what the league called cost certainty. According to an NHL-commissioned report prepared by former U.S. Securities and Exchange Commission chairman Arthur Levitt, prior to 2004–05, NHL clubs spent about 76 percent of their gross revenues on players' salaries – a figure far higher than those in other North American sports – and collectively lost US$273 million during the 2002–03 season. On July 20, 2004, the league presented the NHLPA with six concepts to achieve cost certainty. These concepts were believed to have included a hard, or inflexible, salary cap similar to the one used in the National Football League, a soft salary cap with some capped exceptions similar to the one used in the National Basketball Association, and a centralized salary negotiation system similar to that used in the Arena Football League and Major League Soccer.

The NHLPA, under executive director Bob Goodenow, however disputed the league's financial claims and rejected each of the NHL's proposed six concepts. The NHLPA preferred to retain the existing "marketplace" system where players individually negotiate contracts with teams, and teams have complete control of how much they want to spend on players. Goodenow's mistrust of the league was supported by a November 2004 Forbes report that estimated the NHL's losses were less than half the amounts claimed by the league. Although the NHL's numbers regarding financial losses were disputed, there was no question that several franchises were losing money: some had already declared bankruptcy, and others had held "fire sales" of franchise players, such as the Washington Capitals. Some small-market teams, such as the Pittsburgh Penguins and the remaining small-market Canadian teams, were actually hoping for a lockout, since those teams would make more money by losing a season.

During the lockout, further attempts to negotiate a new CBA floundered. By February 14, the union made an offer to accept a $52 million salary cap under the condition that it was not linked to league revenues, to which the league proposed a counteroffer of a $40 million cap plus $2.2 million in benefits, which the players association rejected. The next day, Bettman sent Goodenow a letter with a final proposal of a $42.5 million cap plus $2.2 million in benefits, setting a deadline of 11:00 the next morning to accept or refuse the offer. The NHLPA presented a counter-offer involving a $49 million cap, which the league rejected. With no resolution by the 11:00 deadline, NHL commission Gary Bettman announced the cancellation of the 2004–05 season on February 16, 2005, making the NHL the first major professional sports league in North America to cancel an entire season because of a labor dispute; the announcement was to have come on February 14, but it was delayed because of the death of the patriarch of the Sutter hockey family four days prior, whose funeral was held on February 15.

With the prospect of losing a second season, a deal was eventually reached on July 13. The salary cap would be adjusted each year to guarantee players 54 percent of total NHL revenues, and there would also be a salary floor. Player contracts are also guaranteed. The players' share increased if revenues rise to specific benchmarks, while revenue sharing split a pool of money from the 10 highest-grossing teams among the bottom 15. There was a $39 million cap in place for the first year of the CBA.

== Canceled All-Star Game ==
The 2005 All-Star Game was originally scheduled to take place on February 13 at Philips Arena in Atlanta, Georgia, the home arena of the Atlanta Thrashers. With negotiations between the NHL and the NHLPA stalled, the league announced the game's cancellation on November 3. Atlanta would later host the 2008 All-Star Game.

== Stanley Cup controversy ==
As a result of the lockout, no Stanley Cup champion was crowned for the first time since the Spanish flu pandemic in 1919. This was controversial among many fans, who questioned whether the NHL had exclusive control over the Cup. A website known as freestanley.com (since closed) was launched, asking fans to write to the Cup trustees and urge them to return to the original pre-NHL Challenge Cup format. Adrienne Clarkson, then Governor General of Canada, alternately proposed that the Cup be presented to the top women's hockey team in lieu of the NHL season, but this idea was so unpopular with NHL fans, players, and officials that the Clarkson Cup was created instead. Meanwhile, a group in Ontario, also known as the "Wednesday Nighters", filed an application with the Ontario Superior Court, claiming that the Cup trustees had overstepped their bounds in signing the 1947 agreement with the NHL, and therefore must award the trophy to any team willing to play for the cup regardless of the lockout.

On February 7, 2006, a settlement was reached in which the trophy could be awarded to non-NHL teams in the event the league does not operate for a season, but the dispute lasted so long that, by the time it was settled, the NHL had resumed operating for the 2005–06 season, and the Stanley Cup went unclaimed for the 2004–05 season.

== Broadcasting rights ==
Before the lockout, the NHL had reached two separate deals with NBC (who would replace ABC as the NHL's American national broadcast television partner) and ESPN. ESPN offered to televise 40 games (only fifteen of which would be during the regular season), all on ESPN2, with presumably only some midweek playoff games, the first two games of the Stanley Cup Finals and the All-Star Game airing on ESPN. NBC's deal involved a revenue sharing agreement with the NHL as opposed to a traditional rights fee, and included rights to six regular season windows, seven postseason broadcasts and games 3–7 of the Stanley Cup Finals. ESPN had a two-year deal that they opted out of after the lockout, leaving the NHL without a U.S. cable partner.

During the lockout, CBC replaced Hockey Night in Canada with a block of Saturday night movies branded as Movie Night in Canada, hosted by Ron MacLean from various junior hockey venues. TSN had other sports programming to fill their time slots.

== See also ==
- 2004–05 NHL lockout
- NHL Collective Bargaining Agreement
- 2004–05 NHL transactions
- 1994 World Series
- 2020 NCAA Division I men's basketball tournament
- 2004 World Cup of Hockey
- 2005 Men's World Ice Hockey Championships
- 2004 in sports
- 2005 in sports
- 2012–13 NHL season
- 1904 World Series
