= 2000–01 OHL season =

Junior ice hockey season

- League: Ontario Hockey League
- Sport: Hockey
- Duration: Preseason; August 2000 – September 2000; Regular season September 2000 – March 2001; Playoffs; March 2001 – May 2001
- Teams: 20
- TV partner(s): Rogers TV, TVCogeco, Shaw TV

Draft
- Top draft pick: Patrick Jarrett
- Picked by: Mississauga IceDogs

Regular season
- Hamilton Spectator Trophy: Plymouth Whalers (3)
- Season MVP: Brad Boyes (Erie Otters)
- Top scorer: Kyle Wellwood (Belleville Bulls)

Playoffs
- Playoffs MVP: Seamus Kotyk (67's)
- Finals champions: Ottawa 67's (2)
- Runners-up: Plymouth Whalers

OHL seasons
- 1999–2000 2001–02

2000–01 CHL season
- League: Canadian Hockey League
- Sport: Hockey
- Duration: OHL; September 2000 – March 2001; QMJHL; September 2000 – March 2001; WHL; September 2000 – March 2001
- Teams: 60
- TV partner(s): RDS; Rogers Sportsnet; Rogers TV; Shaw TV
- Season MVP: Simon Gamache (Val-d'Or Foreurs) (QMJHL)
- Top scorer: Simon Gamache (Val-d'Or Foreurs) (QMJHL)

Memorial Cup
- Finals champions: Red Deer Rebels (WHL) (1st title)
- Runners-up: Val-d'Or Foreurs (QMJHL)

The 2000–01 OHL season was the 21st season of the Ontario Hockey League. The Guelph Storm moved from the Guelph Memorial Gardens to the Guelph Sports and Entertainment Centre at the start of the season. The Owen Sound Platers were renamed to the Owen Sound Attack Twenty teams each played 68 games. The Ottawa 67's won the J. Ross Robertson Cup, defeating the Plymouth Whalers.

== Regular season ==
=== Final standings ===
Note: DIV = Division; GP = Games played; W = Wins; L = Losses; T = Ties; OTL = Overtime losses; GF = Goals for; GA = Goals against; PTS = Points; x = clinched playoff berth; y = clinched division title; z = clinched conference title

=== Eastern conference ===
Rank	Team	DIV	GP	W	L	T	OTL	PTS	GF	GA
1	z-Belleville Bulls	East	68	37	23	5	3	82	275	224
2	y-Sudbury Wolves	Central	68	35	22	8	3	81	237	196
3	x-Toronto St. Michael's Majors	Central	68	35	23	8	2	80	249	201
4	x-Ottawa 67's	East	68	33	21	10	4	80	249	201
5	x-North Bay Centennials	Central	68	32	28	6	2	72	232	220
6	x-Peterborough Petes	East	68	30	28	8	2	70	221	213
7	x-Barrie Colts	Central	68	29	28	7	4	69	214	230
8	x-Kingston Frontenacs	East	68	28	28	11	1	68	232	218
9	Oshawa Generals	East	68	20	36	7	5	52	184	254
10	Mississauga IceDogs	Central	68	3	56	7	2	15	157	380

=== Western conference ===
Rank	Team	DIV	GP	W	L	T	OTL	PTS	GF	GA
1	z-Erie Otters	Midwest	68	45	11	10	2	102	264	171
2	y-Plymouth Whalers	West	68	43	15	5	5	96	253	162
3	x-Windsor Spitfires	West	68	34	22	8	4	80	257	221
4	x-Guelph Storm	Midwest	68	34	23	9	2	79	227	205
5	x-Brampton Battalion	Midwest	68	33	22	9	4	79	231	210
6	x-Owen Sound Attack	Midwest	68	31	27	7	3	72	256	236
7	x-Sarnia Sting	West	68	28	31	7	2	65	235	244
8	x-London Knights	West	68	26	34	5	3	60	222	263
9	Kitchener Rangers	Midwest	68	26	36	6	0	58	183	247
10	Sault Ste. Marie Greyhounds	West	68	23	38	4	3	53	188	256

=== Scoring leaders ===
Player	Team	GP	G	A	Pts	PIM
Kyle Wellwood	Belleville Bulls	68	35	83	118	24
Jason Spezza	Mississauga/Windsor	56	43	73	116	43
Branko Radivojevič	Belleville Bulls	61	34	70	104	77
Randy Rowe	Belleville Bulls	63	64	38	102	30
Brad Boyes	Erie Otters	59	45	45	90	42
Derek MacKenzie	Sudbury Wolves	62	40	49	89	89
Jason Baird	Erie Otters	68	30	58	88	237
Stephen Weiss	Plymouth Whalers	62	40	47	87	45
Steve Ott	Windsor Spitfires	55	50	37	87	164
Jason Jaspers	Sudbury Wolves	63	42	42	84	77

=== Leading goaltenders ===
Player	Team	GP	Mins	W	L	T	GA	SO	Sv%	GAA
Rob Zepp	Plymouth Whalers	55	3247	34	13	5	122	4	0.922	2.25
Adam Munro	Erie Otters	41	2283	26	5	1	88	4	0.926	2.31
Andy Chiodo	Toronto St. Michael's Majors	38	2069	18	11	1	86	4	0.924	2.53
Alex Auld	North Bay Centennials	40	2320	22	11	0	98	1	0.924	2.53
Mike Smith	Kingston/Sudbury	46	2709	22	10	3	116	3	0.919	2.57

== Playoffs ==
Conference quarterfinals
E1	Belleville	4
E8	Kingston	0
E4	Ottawa	4
E5	North Bay	0
E3	Toronto	4
E6	Peterborough	3
E2	Sudbury	4
E7	Barrie	1
W1	Erie	4
W8	London	1
W4	Guelph	0
W5	Brampton	4
W3	Windsor	4
W6	Owen Sound	1
W2	Plymouth	4
W7	Sarnia	0

Conference semifinals
E1	Belleville	2
E4	Ottawa	4
E3	Toronto	4
E2	Sudbury	3
W1	Erie	4
W5	Brampton	1
W3	Windsor	0
W2	Plymouth	4

Conference finals
E4	Ottawa	4
E3	Toronto	0
W1	Erie	1
W2	Plymouth	4

Finals
E4	Ottawa	4
W2	Plymouth	2

=== Conference quarterfinals ===
==== (1) Belleville Bulls vs. (8) Barrie Colts ====
March 26	Belleville Bulls	10 – 2	Kingston Frontenacs	CAA Arena
15:57 - Nathan Robinson (1)		First period	No scoring
9:53 - Malcolm Hutt (1); 15:48 - Mike Renzi (1); 16:59 - pp - Randy Rowe (1); 19:10 - Randy Rowe (2); 19:53 - Branko Radivojevič (1)		Second period	Andrew Ianiero (1) - pp - 9:36
7:05 - pp - Michael Jacobsen (1); 12:26 - Mike Renzi (2); 19:35 - André Deveaux (1)		Third period	Travis Lisabeth (1) - 5:19
Ján Chovan (27 saves / 29 shots)		Goalie stats	Peter Hamerlík (28 saves / 34 shots); Glenn Ridler (13 saves / 17 shots)

March 27	Kingston Frontenacs	2 – 3	Belleville Bulls	Kingston Memorial Centre
Andrew Ianiero (2) - pp - 15:55		First period	1:41 - pp - Branko Radivojevič (2); 12:56 - pp - Randy Rowe (4)
No scoring		Second period	No scoring
Lou Dickenson (1) - pp - 1:57		Third period	18:26 - Randy Rowe (5)
Peter Hamerlík (33 saves / 36 shots)		Goalie stats	Ján Chovan (31 saves / 33 shots)

April 5	Belleville Bulls	6 – 5	2OT	Kingston Frontenacs	CAA Arena
Nathan Robinson (2) - 8:08; Mike Renzi (3) - 9:01		First period		No scoring
Matt Coughlin (1) - pp - 10:10; Nick Policelli (1) - 11:31		Second period		4:09 - Tomáš Škvaridlo (1); 16:37 - Andrew Ianiero (3)
Nathan Robinson (3) - 17:45		Third period		7:07 - Tomáš Škvaridlo (2); 12:52 - Travis Lisabeth (2); 19:10 - pp - Cory Stillman (1)
Branko Radivojevič (3) - 18:03		Second overtime period		No scoring
Ján Chovan (35 saves / 40 shots)		Goalie stats		Peter Hamerlík (20 saves / 24 shots); Glenn Ridler (36 saves / 38 shots)

March 30	Kingston Frontenacs	3 – 5	Belleville Bulls	Kingston Memorial Centre
3:23 - Brett Clouthier (1); 4:40 - Cory Stillman (2)		First period	Adam Paiement (1) - 2:56; Mike Renzi (4) - 5:51
No scoring		Second period	Branko Radivojevič (4) - 12:03
11:53 - Derek Campbell (1)		Third period	Kyle Wellwood (1) - 13:16; Randy Rowe (6) - en - 19:31
Glenn Ridler (36 saves / 40 shots)		Goalie stats	Ján Chovan (24 saves / 27 shots)

Belleville wins series 4 – 0

==== (4) Ottawa 67's vs. (5) North Bay Centennials ====
March 25	Ottawa 67's	5 – 1	North Bay Centennials	Ottawa Civic Centre
9:25 - Zenon Konopka (1); 13:48 - Carter Trevisani (1)		First period	Ryan Armstrong (1) - pp - 2:59
8:33 - pp - Lance Galbraith (1); 16:58 - Miguel Delisle (1)		Second period	No scoring
14:31 - pp - Sebastien Savage (1)		Third period	No scoring
Seamus Kotyk (35 saves / 36 shots)		Goalie stats	Alex Auld (32 saves / 37 shots)

March 27	Ottawa 67's	3 – 1	North Bay Centennials	Ottawa Civic Centre
7:33 - Rodney Bauman (1)		First period	Josh Tataryn (1) - 2:13
12:52 - pp - Joe Talbot (1)		Second period	No scoring
8:36 - Rodney Bauman (2)		Third period	No scoring
Seamus Kotyk (25 saves / 26 shots)		Goalie stats	Alex Auld (30 saves / 33 shots)

March 30	North Bay Centennials	1 – 3	Ottawa 67's	North Bay Memorial Gardens
No scoring		First period	Jonathan Zion (1) - pp - 3:09
12:55 - Jeffrey Doyle (1)		Second period	Joe Talbot (2) - 19:21
No scoring		Third period	Vadim Sozinov (1) - 5:43
Alex Auld (29 saves / 32 shots)		Goalie stats	Seamus Kotyk (30 saves / 31 shots)

April 1	North Bay Centennials	3 – 4	Ottawa 67's	North Bay Memorial Gardens
No scoring		First period	Joe Talbot (3) - 9:02
9:22 - George Halkidis (1); 11:13 - pp - Ryan Armstrong (2)		Second period	Zenon Konopka (2) - pp - 4:20; Lance Galbraith (2) - 12:28; Rodney Bauman (3) - pp - 12:52
19:34 - Chris Eade (1)		Third period	No scoring
Alex Auld (37 saves / 41 shots)		Goalie stats	Seamus Kotyk (30 saves / 33 shots)

Ottawa wins series 4 – 0

==== (3) Toronto St. Michael's Majors vs. (6) Peterborough Petes ====
March 25	Toronto St. Michael's Majors	1 – 4	Peterborough Petes	St. Michael's College School Arena
No scoring		First period	Brad Self (1) - 13:14; Matt Armstrong (1) - 15:17
13:58 - Michael Gough (1)		Second period	Eric Staal (1) - pp - 18:20
No scoring		Third period	Marcel Rodman (1) - en - 19:12
Andy Chiodo (33 saves / 36 shots)		Goalie stats	Joey MacDonald (40 saves / 41 shots)

March 27	Peterborough Petes	2 – 3	Toronto St. Michael's Majors	Peterborough Memorial Centre
Matt Armstrong (2) - 8:03		First period	No scoring
No scoring		Second period	No scoring
Matt Armstrong (3) - pp - 19:16		Third period	5:26 - Drew Fata (1); 7:26 - Lindsay Plunkett (1); 17:08 - Darryl Bootland (1)
Joey MacDonald (48 saves / 51 shots)		Goalie stats	Peter Budaj (24 saves / 26 shots)

March 29	Toronto St. Michael's Majors	3 – 0	Peterborough Petes	St. Michael's College School Arena
Ryan Walsh (1) - pp - 11:17		First period	No scoring
No scoring		Second period	No scoring
Lindsay Plunkett (2) - 6:56; František Lukeš (1) - 17:40		Third period	No scoring
Peter Budaj (36 saves / 36 shots)		Goalie stats	Joey MacDonald (42 saves / 45 shots)

March 31	Peterborough Petes	2 – 3	Toronto St. Michael's Majors	Peterborough Memorial Centre
No scoring		First period	Tim Brent (1) - 3:39; Lindsay Plunkett (3) - pp - 18:48
14:18 - Kurtis Foster (1)		Second period	František Lukeš (2) - 5:57
5:55 - Brad Self (2)		Third period	No scoring
Joey MacDonald (22 saves / 25 shots)		Goalie stats	Peter Budaj (22 saves / 24 shots)

April 1	Toronto St. Michael's Majors	4 – 6	Peterborough Petes	St. Michael's College School Arena
6:33 - pp - Tim Brent (2); 15:26 - pp - Matt Ellis (1)		First period	No scoring
4:07 - Mark Popovic (1)		Second period	Greg Chambers (1) - 5:31; Jamie Chamberlain (1) - 10:48; Brad Self (3) - 19:44
15:19 - Lindsay Plunkett (4)		Third period	Marcel Rodman (2) - 0:47; John Brioux (1) - 14:26; Brad Self (4) - en - 19:20
Peter Budaj (30 saves / 35 shots)		Goalie stats	Joey MacDonald (37 saves / 41 shots)

April 3	Peterborough Petes	4 – 1	Toronto St. Michael's Majors	Peterborough Memorial Centre
No scoring		First period	Darryl Bootland (2) - 12:10
4:22 - Brad Self (5); 9:11 - Matt Herneisen (1)		Second period	No scoring
1:48 - Eric Staal (2); 16:48 - Marcel Rodman (3)		Third period	No scoring
Joey MacDonald (35 saves / 36 shots)		Goalie stats	Andy Chiodo (24 saves / 28 shots)

April 5	Toronto St. Michael's Majors	3 – 2	OT	Peterborough Petes	St. Michael's College School Arena
4:11 - Ryan Walsh (2)		First period		Marcel Rodman (4) - pp - 13:10; Brad Self (6) - pp - 18:23
11:37 - Darryl Bootland (3)		Second period		No scoring
No scoring		Third period		No scoring
5:36 - Matt Ellis (2)		First overtime period		No scoring
Andy Chiodo (34 saves / 36 shots)		Goalie stats		Joey MacDonald (37 saves / 40 shots)

Toronto wins series 4 – 3

==== (2) Sudbury Wolves vs. (7) Barrie Colts ====
March 26	Sudbury Wolves	3 – 2	Barrie Colts	Sudbury Community Arena
No scoring		First period	Matt Dzieduszycki (1) - 5:46
7:49 - Alexei Semenov (1); 11:45 - pp - Chris Kelly (1)		Second period	No scoring
17:43 - Derek MacKenzie (1)		Third period	Matt Dzieduszycki (2) - 0:53
Mike Smith (34 saves / 36 shots)		Goalie stats	David Chant (30 saves / 33 shots)

March 27	Sudbury Wolves	3 – 2	Barrie Colts	Sudbury Community Arena
6:05 - pp - Chris Kelly (2)		First period	Joey Tenute (1) - pp - 12:09
1:39 - Derek MacKenzie (2); 4:36 - pp - Chris Kelly (3)		Second period	Mike Henderson (1) - pp - 6:32
No scoring		Third period	No scoring
Mike Smith (22 saves / 24 shots)		Goalie stats	David Chant (30 saves / 33 shots)

March 25	Barrie Colts	0 – 6	Sudbury Wolves	Barrie Molson Centre
No scoring		First period	Chris Kelly (4) - pp - 13:38
No scoring		Second period	Derek MacKenzie (3) - 8:38; Kip Brennan (1) - pp - 12:44
No scoring		Third period	Chris Kelly (5) - 4:37; Kip Brennan (2) - pp - 13:33; T.J. Warkus (1) - pp - 16:24
David Chant (20 saves / 23 shots); Mike D'Alessandro (13 saves / 16 shots)		Goalie stats	Mike Smith (30 saves / 30 shots)

March 30	Barrie Colts	4 – 1	Sudbury Wolves	Barrie Molson Centre
0:58 - Blaine Down (1); 4:49 - pp - Fraser Clair (1); 15:36 - pp - Blaine Down (2)		First period	No scoring
8:02 - Erik Reitz (1)		Second period	No scoring
No scoring		Third period	Chris Kelly (6) - sh - 4:21
David Chant (37 saves / 38 shots)		Goalie stats	Mike Smith (24 saves / 28 shots)

April 1	Sudbury Wolves	2 – 0	Barrie Colts	Sudbury Community Arena
2:27 - pp - Alexei Semenov (2)		First period	No scoring
10:32 - pp - Jason Jaspers (1)		Second period	No scoring
No scoring		Third period	No scoring
Mike Smith (17 saves / 17 shots)		Goalie stats	David Chant (31 saves / 33 shots)

Sudbury wins series 4 – 1

==== (1) Erie Otters vs. (8) London Knights ====
March 24	Erie Otters	7 – 3	London Knights	Erie Civic Center
12:26 - pp - Brad Boyes (1)		First period	No scoring
10:10 - pp - Brad Yeo (1); 12:59 - Nikita Alexeev (1)		Second period	Jason Davies (1) - 8:29
5:05 - Chris Berti (1); 5:29 - Cory Pecker (1); 9:34 - pp - Derrick Byfuglien (1); 14:51 - pp - Mike Nelson (1)		Third period	Jason Davies (2) - pp - 13:24; Jason Davies (3) - 13:43
Adam Munro (22 saves / 25 shots)		Goalie stats	Aaron Molnar (32 saves / 36 shots); Christopher Lawrence (7 saves / 10 shots)

March 25	Erie Otters	5 – 3	London Knights	Erie Civic Center
13:56 - Jason Baird (1)		First period	Andy Burnham (1) - 13:28
9:07 - pp - Joe Guenther (1); 17:13 - Nikita Alexeev (2)		Second period	Ryan Held (1) - pp - 0:57; Rick Nash (1) - pp - 19:12
1:10 - Brad Boyes (2); 15:33 - Nikita Alexeev (3)		Third period	No scoring
Adam Munro (19 saves / 22 shots)		Goalie stats	Aaron Molnar (40 saves / 45 shots)

March 30	London Knights	4 – 3	Erie Otters	London Ice House
18:45 - Ryan Held (2)		First period	No scoring
9:58 - sh - Rick Nash (2); 11:07 - Danny Bois (1)		Second period	No scoring
4:31 - Danny Bois (2)		Third period	Mike McKeown (1) - 12:19; Chris Berti (2) - 13:28; Brad Boyes (3) - sh - 17:19
Aaron Molnar (38 saves / 41 shots)		Goalie stats	Adam Munro (14 saves / 17 shots); Jean-François Perras (9 saves / 10 shots)

March 31	London Knights	2 – 4	Erie Otters	London Ice House
10:19 - pp - Rick Nash (3); 15:54 - Mike Stathopoulos (1)		First period	No scoring
No scoring		Second period	Mike Nelson (2) - 8:09; Brad Boyes (4) - 13:12
No scoring		Third period	Brad Boyes (5) - 3:58; Carlo Colaiacovo (1) - 8:30
Aaron Molnar (38 saves / 42 shots)		Goalie stats	Jean-François Perras (18 saves / 20 shots)

April 1	Erie Otters	3 – 2	London Knights	Erie Civic Center
9:17 - sh - Nikita Alexeev (4)		First period	Ryan Held (3) - pp - 9:28
10:26 - Cory Pecker (2)		Second period	No scoring
18:56 - Jason Baird (2)		Third period	Ryan Held (4) - 6:37
Jean-François Perras (20 saves / 22 shots)		Goalie stats	Aaron Molnar (38 saves / 41 shots)

Erie wins series 4 – 1

==== (4) Guelph Storm vs. (5) Brampton Battalion ====
March 25	Guelph Storm	0 – 5	Brampton Battalion	Guelph Sports and Entertainment Centre
No scoring		First period	Raffi Torres (1) - pp - 11:27
No scoring		Second period	Aaron Van Leusen (1) - pp - 12:35; Raffi Torres (2) - 15:21
No scoring		Third period	Jeff Bateman (1) - 5:45; Jay McClement (1) - sh - 15:09
Craig Anderson (46 saves / 51 shots)		Goalie stats	Brian Finley (35 saves / 35 shots)

March 27	Brampton Battalion	4 – 2	Guelph Storm	Brampton Centre for Sports and Entertainment
Aaron Van Leusen (2) - 1:00; Kurt MacSweyn (1) - pp - 4:56; Jay McClement (2) - 16:01		First period	12:59 - Frank Burgio (1)
No scoring		Second period	No scoring
Jay McClement (3) - 1:58		Third period	No scoring
Brian Finley (27 saves / 29 shots)		Goalie stats	Craig Anderson (22 saves / 26 shots)

March 29	Guelph Storm	2 – 4	Brampton Battalion	Guelph Sports and Entertainment Centre
No scoring		First period	7:26 - pp - Rostislav Klesla (1)
Brian Passmore (1) - 19:55		Second period	13:11 - Jeff Bateman (2); 19:08 - Raffi Torres (3)
Daniel Paille (2) - pp - 19:23		Third period	2:40 - pp - Jason Maleyko (1)
Craig Anderson (26 saves / 30 shots)		Goalie stats	Brian Finley (33 saves / 35 shots)

March 30	Brampton Battalion	4 – 1	Guelph Storm	Brampton Centre for Sports and Entertainment
7:43 - Aaron Van Leusen (3)		First period	No scoring
9:15 - Chris Rowan (1); 19:05 - pp - Rostislav Klesla (2)		Second period	Peter Flache (1) - 4:39
18:07 - Jay McClement (4)		Third period	No scoring
Brian Finley (39 saves / 40 shots)		Goalie stats	Craig Anderson (36 saves / 40 shots)

Brampton wins series 4 – 0

==== (3) Windsor Spitfires vs. (6) Owen Sound Attack ====
March 25	Windsor Spitfires	6 – 3	Owen Sound Attack	Windsor Arena
6:01 - Jason Spezza (1); 6:56 - pp - Shawn Mather (1); 8:32 - pp - Craig Kennedy (1)		First period	Mike Barrett (1) - pp - 16:54
2:23 - Shawn Mather (2)		Second period	Joel Ward (1) - 6:20
1:00 - Ahren Nittel (1); 3:15 - John Scott Dickson (1)		Third period	John Osborne (1) - 15:51
Michael Leighton (27 saves / 30 shots)		Goalie stats	Cory Roberts (39 saves / 45 shots); Justin Day (7 saves / 7 shots)

March 27	Owen Sound Attack	7 – 2	Windsor Spitfires	Harry Lumley Bayshore Community Centre
Bryan Kazarian (1) - 8:14; Shawn Snider (1) - 11:40; Trevor Blanchard (1) - 12:18		First period	No scoring
Dan Sullivan (1) - 3:50; Shawn Snider (2) - 15:54; Bryan Kazarian (2) - 16:31		Second period	3:24 - Steve Hildenbrand (1)
Bryan Kazarian (3) - 6:30		Third period	11:34 - Kyle Chapman (1)
Cory Roberts (34 saves / 36 shots)		Goalie stats	Michael Leighton (27 saves / 33 shots); Ryan Aschaber (9 saves / 10 shots)

March 29	Windsor Spitfires	5 – 0	Owen Sound Attack	Windsor Arena
No scoring		First period	No scoring
Kyle Chapman (2) - 5:31; Steve Ott (1) - sh - 7:44; Kyle Chapman (3) - pp - 18:56		Second period	No scoring
Kyle Chapman (4) - 9:55; Shawn Mather (3) - 17:30		Third period	No scoring
Michael Leighton (26 saves / 26 shots)		Goalie stats	Cory Roberts (40 saves / 45 shots)

March 31	Owen Sound Attack	1 – 4	Windsor Spitfires	Harry Lumley Bayshore Community Centre
No scoring		First period	Ahren Nittel (2) - 8:38
No scoring		Second period	Jason Spezza (2) - 10:10
17:55 - sh - Joel Ward (2)		Third period	David Bowman (1) - 8:19; Kyle Chapman (5) - pp - 18:49
Cory Roberts (39 saves / 43 shots)		Goalie stats	Michael Leighton (41 saves / 42 shots)

April 1	Windsor Spitfires	6 – 2	Owen Sound Attack	Windsor Arena
0:14 - Shawn Mather (4); 15:23 - John Scott Dickson (2)		First period	No scoring
0:54 - Steve Hildenbrand (2); 9:49 - John Scott Dickson (3)		Second period	Ryan Sharp (1) - 6:23
2:43 - pp - Steve Hildenbrand (3); 11:25 - pp - Matt Maccarone (1)		Third period	Kyle McAllister (1) - 18:29
Michael Leighton (33 saves / 35 shots)		Goalie stats	Justin Day (25 saves / 29 shots); Cory Roberts (31 saves / 33 shots)

Windsor wins series 4 – 1

==== (2) Plymouth Whalers vs. (7) Sarnia Sting ====
March 24	Plymouth Whalers	8 – 4	Sarnia Sting	Compuware Sports Arena
0:17 - Stephen Weiss (1); 9:59 - pp - Tomáš Kůrka (1); 11:44 - Chad LaRose (1); 14:41 - pp - Kris Vernarsky (1); 19:20 - Chad LaRose (2)		First period	Kris Newbury (1) - pp - 13:18
2:03 - Stephen Weiss (2); 9:04 - pp - Chad LaRose (3)		Second period	Robb Palahnuk (1) - sh - 8:08; Dusty Jamieson (1) - pp - 11:36
No scoring		Third period	Robb Palahnuk (2) - pp - 15:09
Rob Zepp (22 saves / 26 shots)		Goalie stats	Cory Campbell (21 saves / 26 shots); Robert Gherson (30 saves / 33 shots)

March 26	Sarnia Sting	4 – 6	Plymouth Whalers	Progressive Auto Sales Arena
Alexander Buturlin (1) - pp - 9:54; Dusty Jamieson (2) - pp - 10:42		First period	6:00 - Tomáš Kůrka (2); 8:56 - Tomáš Kůrka (3)
Dusty Jamieson (3) - pp - 18:14		Second period	10:40 - Chad LaRose (4); 11:57 - James Wisniewski (1)
Alexander Buturlin (2) - pp - 10:00		Third period	14:44 - pp - Kris Vernarsky (2); 19:23 - en - Preston Mizzi (1)
Cory Campbell (42 saves / 47 shots)		Goalie stats	Rob Zepp (32 saves / 36 shots)

March 28	Plymouth Whalers	6 – 2	Sarnia Sting	Compuware Sports Arena
George Nistas (1) - 3:22		First period	No scoring
Damian Surma (1) - 5:30		Second period	19:36 - pp - Dusty Jamieson (4)
Chad Wiseman (2) - 3:41; Stephen Weiss (3) - 12:31; Karl Stewart (1) - pp - en - 17:16; Chad LaRose (5) - en - 18:29		Third period	0:42 - Alexander Buturlin (3)
Rob Zepp (15 saves / 17 shots)		Goalie stats	Robert Gherson (36 saves / 40 shots)

March 30	Sarnia Sting	1 – 2	Plymouth Whalers	Progressive Auto Sales Arena
No scoring		First period	No scoring
14:20 - Eric Himelfarb (1)		Second period	Chad LaRose (6) - 5:42; Preston Mizzi (2) - 8:09
No scoring		Third period	No scoring
Robert Gherson (31 saves / 33 shots)		Goalie stats	Rob Zepp (22 saves / 23 shots)

Plymouth wins series 4 – 0

=== Conference semifinals ===
==== (1) Belleville Bulls vs. (4) Ottawa 67's ====
April 7	Belleville Bulls	1 – 8	Ottawa 67's	CAA Arena
No scoring		First period	Zenon Konopka (3) - pp - 3:00
No scoring		Second period	Lance Galbraith (3) - 0:35; Lance Galbraith (4) - pp - 9:05; Joe Talbot (4) - 13:32; Lance Galbraith (5) - pp - 15:50
8:46 - pp - Kyle Wellwood (2)		Third period	Vadim Sozinov (2) - 1:07; Luke Sellars (1) - 2:01; Sebastien Savage (2) - pp - 11:55
Ján Chovan (26 saves / 32 shots); Paulo Colaiacovo (3 saves / 5 shots)		Goalie stats	Seamus Kotyk (37 saves / 38 shots)

April 8	Ottawa 67's	6 – 4	Belleville Bulls	Ottawa Civic Centre
Lance Galbraith (6) - 6:41; Russ Moyer (1) - 11:21; Adam Chapman (1) - 14:20; Adam Chapman (2) - 14:48; Miguel Delisle (2) - 18:23		First period	4:27 - Branko Radivojevič (5); 17:47 - Cody McCormick (1)
Russ Moyer (2) - pp - 4:26		Second period	14:37 - Nathan Robinson (4)
No scoring		Third period	16:37 - Randy Rowe (7)
Seamus Kotyk (35 saves / 39 shots); John Ceci (0 saves / 0 shots)		Goalie stats	Ján Chovan (31 saves / 37 shots)

April 11	Belleville Bulls	8 – 2	Ottawa 67's	CAA Arena
Kyle Wellwood (3) - pp - 8:19; Branko Radivojevič (6) - 7:29		First period	5:24 - pp - Miguel Delisle (3)
André Deveaux (2) - 11:04; Mike Renzi (5) - 11:40		Second period	17:13 - pp - Lance Galbraith (7)
Mike Renzi (6) - 11:14; Randy Rowe (8) - 12:18; André Deveaux (3) - 15:58; Nick Policelli (2) - pp - 17:55		Third period	No scoring
Ján Chovan (29 saves / 31 shots)		Goalie stats	Seamus Kotyk (36 saves / 42 shots); John Ceci (7 saves / 9 shots)

April 13	Ottawa 67's	4 – 3	OT	Belleville Bulls	Ottawa Civic Centre
2:28 - Matthew Albiani (1)		First period		Nathan Robinson (5) - sh - 4:26; Randy Rowe (9) - 14:11
1:40 - Lance Galbraith (8)		Second period		Nathan Robinson (6) - 19:46
19:38 - Zenon Konopka (4)		Third period		No scoring
2:25 - Russ Moyer (3)		First overtime period		No scoring
Seamus Kotyk (31 saves / 34 shots)		Goalie stats		Ján Chovan (33 saves / 37 shots)

April 14	Belleville Bulls	4 – 3	Ottawa 67's	CAA Arena
5:18 - pp - Michael Jacobsen (2); 7:43 - pp - David Cornacchia (1); 10:56 - pp - Malcolm Hutt (2)		First period	Lance Galbraith (9) - pp - 3:27
12:50 - Mike Renzi (7)		Second period	Miguel Delisle (4) - pp - 9:02; Jeremy Van Hoof (1) - 17:16
No scoring		Third period	No scoring
Ján Chovan (38 saves / 41 shots)		Goalie stats	Seamus Kotyk (25 saves / 29 shots)

April 17	Ottawa 67's	7 – 2	Belleville Bulls	Ottawa Civic Centre
10:54 - Jeremy Van Hoof (2); 18:16 - pp - Jonathan Zion (2)		First period	Matt Stajan (1) - 2:05
0:22 - Jeremy Van Hoof (3); 3:35 - Vadim Sozinov (3); 16:05 - sh - Joe Talbot (5)		Second period	Mike Renzi (8) - 1:27
6:59 - pp - Lance Galbraith (10); 10:44 - Lance Galbraith (11)		Third period	No scoring
Seamus Kotyk (29 saves / 31 shots)		Goalie stats	Ján Chovan (20 saves / 25 shots); Paulo Colaiacovo (12 saves / 14 shots)

Ottawa wins series 4 – 2

==== (2) Sudbury Wolves vs. (3) Toronto St. Michael's Majors ====
April 6	Sudbury Wolves	5 – 3	Toronto St. Michael's Majors	Sudbury Community Arena
12:40 - pp - Kip Brennan (3)		First period	No scoring
6:05 - pp - Chris Kelly (7); 7:05 - pp - Kip Brennan (4); 19:32 - pp - Alexei Semenov (3)		Second period	Lorne Misita (1) - pp - 16:16; František Lukeš (3) - pp - 18:33
15:23 - pp - Chris Kelly (8)		Third period	Adam DeLeeuw (1) - 19:28
Mike Smith (23 saves / 26 shots)		Goalie stats	Peter Budaj (31 saves / 36 shots)

April 9	Toronto St. Michael's Majors	3 – 2	OT	Sudbury Wolves	St. Michael's College School Arena
No scoring		First period		4:50 - Chris Kelly (9)
Lindsay Plunkett (5) - pp - 6:55; Matt Bannan (1) - pp - 10:08		Second period		16:31 - pp - T.J. Warkus (2)
No scoring		Third period		No scoring
Lindsay Plunkett (6) - 15:03		First overtime period		No scoring
Andy Chiodo (44 saves / 46 shots)		Goalie stats		Mike Smith (43 saves / 46 shots)

April 11	Sudbury Wolves	5 – 1	Toronto St. Michael's Majors	Sudbury Community Arena
Chad Starling (1) - 3:22		First period	No scoring
Derek MacKenzie (4) - pp - 7:59; Alexei Semenov (4) - 14:19; Jason Jaspers (2) - 17:14		Second period	1:51 - Ryan Walsh (3)
No scoring		Third period	Chris Kelly (10) - pp - 10:26
Mike Smith (27 saves / 28 shots)		Goalie stats	Andy Chiodo (12 saves / 14 shots); Peter Budaj (12 saves / 15 shots)

April 12	Toronto St. Michael's Majors	2 – 9	Sudbury Wolves	St. Michael's College School Arena
2:42 - Matt Ellis (3); 10:04 - pp - Mark Popovic (2)		First period	Chris Kelly (11) - pp - 6:54
No scoring		Second period	Fedor Fedorov (1) - pp - 2:41; Kip Brennan (5) - 3:31; Fedor Fedorov (2) - 9:13; Jason Jaspers (3) - sh - 11:13; Fedor Fedorov (3) - pp - 13:15
No scoring		Third period	Mike Vaillaincourt (1) - 8:40; Steven Ellis (1) - 15:20; Fedor Fedorov (4) - sh - 17:04
Andy Chiodo (43 saves / 52 shots)		Goalie stats	Mike Smith (25 saves / 27 shots)

April 14	Sudbury Wolves	2 – 4	Toronto St. Michael's Majors	Sudbury Community Arena
8:22 - Josh Gratton (1)		First period	Matt Bannan (2) - 9:16
15:14 - pp - Derek MacKenzie (5)		Second period	Michael Gough (2) - 10:26; Lindsay Plunkett (7) - 16:52
No scoring		Third period	Ryan Walsh (4) - en - 18:53
Mike Smith (15 saves / 18 shots)		Goalie stats	Peter Budaj (41 saves / 43 shots)

April 17	Toronto St. Michael's Majors	3 – 1	Sudbury Wolves	St. Michael's College School Arena
No scoring		First period	No scoring
18:56 - Mark Popovic (3)		Second period	Mike Vaillaincourt (2) - 10:39
3:06 - Matt Bannan (3); 4:37 - Lorne Misita (2)		Third period	No scoring
Peter Budaj (41 saves / 42 shots)		Goalie stats	Mike Smith (27 saves / 30 shots)

April 19	Sudbury Wolves	1 – 3	Toronto St. Michael's Majors	Sudbury Community Arena
No scoring		First period	Matt Bannan (4) - 4:33; Michael Gough (3) - 9:17
19:16 - sh - Derek MacKenzie (6)		Second period	Matt Ellis (4) - 4:28
No scoring		Third period	No scoring
Mike Smith (17 saves / 20 shots)		Goalie stats	Peter Budaj (34 saves / 35 shots)

Toronto wins series 4 – 3

==== (1) Erie Otters vs. (5) Brampton Battalion ====
April 7	Erie Otters	3 – 4	Brampton Battalion	Erie Civic Center
1:52 - Cory Pecker (3); 3:37 - Brad Yeo (2)		First period	No scoring
19:42 - Cory Pecker (4)		Second period	Jeff Bateman (3) - pp - 5:54; Corey LeClair (1) - 13:30
No scoring		Third period	Raffi Torres (4) - 0:09; Raffi Torres (5) - 7:09
Jean-François Perras (32 saves / 36 shots)		Goalie stats	Brian Finley (27 saves / 30 shots)

April 8	Brampton Battalion	2 – 7	Erie Otters	Brampton Centre for Sports and Entertainment
No scoring		First period	0:41 - Carlo Colaiacovo (2); 8:47 - sh - Cory Pecker (5); 17:14 - pp - Nikita Alexeev (5)
Jeff Bateman (4) - 10:40; Lukáš Havel (1) - 19:27		Second period	11:18 - pp - Brad Boyes (6); 14:05 - Brad Boyes (7); 16:33 - sh - Cory Pecker (6)
No scoring		Third period	10:06 - sh - Cory Pecker (7)
Brian Finley (17 saves / 22 shots); Brad Topping (5 saves / 7 shots)		Goalie stats	Adam Munro (28 saves / 30 shots)

April 11	Erie Otters	5 – 2	Brampton Battalion	Erie Civic Center
Nikita Alexeev (6) - 8:32		First period	No scoring
Derrick Byfuglien (2) - 2:23		Second period	18:38 - Raffi Torres (6)
Carlo Colaiacovo (3) - 5:43; Brad Yeo (3) - 7:49; Mike Nelson (3) - 9:40		Third period	14:14 - pp - Jason Maleyko (2)
Adam Munro (20 saves / 22 shots)		Goalie stats	Brian Finley (35 saves / 40 shots); Brad Topping (0 saves / 0 shots)

April 13	Brampton Battalion	0 – 3	Erie Otters	Brampton Centre for Sports and Entertainment
No scoring		First period	No scoring
No scoring		Second period	Cory Pecker (8) - sh - 11:12; Cory Pecker (9) - pp - 17:06
No scoring		Third period	Cory Pecker (10) - 18:48
Brian Finley (32 saves / 35 shots)		Goalie stats	Adam Munro (36 saves / 36 shots)

April 14	Erie Otters	5 – 4	Brampton Battalion	Erie Civic Center
11:34 - pp - Mike Nelson (4)		First period	Jeff Bateman (5) - pp - 13:14
2:52 - Jason Baird (3); 6:21 - Cory Pecker (11)		Second period	Raffi Torres (7) - 0:19
13:32 - Jason Baird (4); 19:57 - Brad Boyes (8)		Third period	Paul Flache (1) - pp - 9:46; Jay Harrison (1) - 18:47
Adam Munro (26 saves / 30 shots)		Goalie stats	Brian Finley (39 saves / 44 shots)

Erie wins series 4 – 1

==== (2) Plymouth Whalers vs. (4) Windsor Spitfires ====
April 6	Plymouth Whalers	4 – 3	Windsor Spitfires	Compuware Sports Arena
8:45 - Cole Jarrett (1)		First period	Steve Ott (2) - pp - 10:04
4:20 - pp - Stacey Britstone (1); 5:42 - Preston Mizzi (3); 18:01 - Bryan Thompson (1)		Second period	Shawn Mather (5) - pp - 11:13; Jason Spezza (3) - 13:59
No scoring		Third period	No scoring
Rob Zepp (20 saves / 23 shots)		Goalie stats	Michael Leighton (32 saves / 36 shots)

April 8	Windsor Spitfires	2 – 4	Plymouth Whalers	Windsor Arena
Steve Ott (3) - 12:02; Shawn Mather (6) - 14:36		First period	No scoring
No scoring		Second period	6:02 - Chad Wiseman (3); 6:24 - Chad Wiseman (4); 15:09 - Stephen Weiss (4); 16:32 - pp - Kris Vernarsky (3)
No scoring		Third period	No scoring
Michael Leighton (33 saves / 37 shots)		Goalie stats	Rob Zepp (26 saves / 28 shots)

April 10	Plymouth Whalers	4 – 3	Windsor Spitfires	Compuware Sports Arena
James Wisniewski (2) - pp - 8:47		First period	No scoring
Cole Jarrett (2) - pp - 13:03; Tomáš Kůrka (4) - pp - 15:35		Second period	11:13 - Ahren Nittel (3); 11:52 - Jason Spezza (4); 12:13 - Shawn Mather (7)
Chad Wiseman (5) - sh - 8:07		Third period	No scoring
Rob Zepp (22 saves / 25 shots)		Goalie stats	Michael Leighton (41 saves / 45 shots)

April 12	Windsor Spitfires	2 – 5	Plymouth Whalers	Windsor Arena
0:57 - Frank Sinacori (1)		First period	Chad Wiseman (6) - 13:51
No scoring		Second period	Stephen Weiss (5) - 4:08; Kris Vernarsky (4) - 5:58
16:16 - pp - Tim Gleason (1)		Third period	Tomáš Kůrka (5) - en - 18:58; Cole Jarrett (3) - en - 19:44
Michael Leighton (27 saves / 30 shots)		Goalie stats	Rob Zepp (30 saves / 32 shots)

Plymouth wins series 4 – 0

=== Conference finals ===
==== (3) Toronto St. Michael's Majors vs. (4) Ottawa 67's ====
April 22	Toronto St. Michael's Majors	0 – 3	Ottawa 67's	St. Michael's College School Arena
No scoring		First period	Luke Sellars (2) - 3:24
No scoring		Second period	Miguel Delisle (5) - 18:24
No scoring		Third period	Zenon Konopka (5) - en - 19:42
Peter Budaj (35 saves / 37 shots)		Goalie stats	Seamus Kotyk (36 saves / 36 shots)

April 23	Toronto St. Michael's Majors	2 – 4	Ottawa 67's	St. Michael's College School Arena
8:37 - Michael Gough (4)		First period	Lance Galbraith (12) - pp - 18:53
0:51 - pp - Ryan Walsh (5)		Second period	Brendan Bell (1) - 6:33
No scoring		Third period	Rodney Bauman (4) - pp - 9:32; Joe Talbot (6) - en - 19:17
Andy Chiodo (35 saves / 38 shots)		Goalie stats	Seamus Kotyk (25 saves / 27 shots)

April 26	Ottawa 67's	5 – 3	Toronto St. Michael's Majors	Ottawa Civic Centre
8:36 - Bryan Rodney (1); 10:38 - pp - Luke Sellars (3)		First period	No scoring
4:55 - Matthew Albiani (2); 9:30 - pp - Adam Chapman (3)		Second period	František Lukeš (4) - 2:09; Matt Bannan (5) - 2:34
8:04 - Joe Talbot (7)		Third period	Steve Farquharson (1) - 10:53
Seamus Kotyk (22 saves / 25 shots)		Goalie stats	Andy Chiodo (6 saves / 8 shots); Peter Budaj (35 saves / 38 shots)

April 27	Ottawa 67's	3 – 0	Toronto St. Michael's Majors	Ottawa Civic Centre
19:46 - pp - Jonathan Zion (3)		First period	No scoring
9:49 - pp - Joe Talbot (8); 10:44 - Miguel Delisle (6)		Second period	No scoring
No scoring		Third period	No scoring
Seamus Kotyk (20 saves / 20 shots)		Goalie stats	Andy Chiodo (38 saves / 41 shots)

Ottawa wins series 4 – 0

==== (1) Erie Otters vs. (2) Plymouth Whalers ====
April 21	Erie Otters	0 – 3	Plymouth Whalers	Erie Civic Center
No scoring		First period	Damian Surma (2) - 3:07
No scoring		Second period	Cole Jarrett (4) - 3:42
No scoring		Third period	Tomáš Kůrka (6) - sh - 11:32
Adam Munro (19 saves / 21 shots); Jean-François Perras (21 saves / 22 shots)		Goalie stats	Rob Zepp (21 saves / 21 shots)

April 24	Plymouth Whalers	1 – 4	Erie Otters	Compuware Sports Arena
Chad Wiseman (7) - pp - 5:47		First period	6:14 - Joe Guenther (2)
No scoring		Second period	3:33 - Brad Yeo (4); 7:01 - Brad Boyes (9)
No scoring		Third period	19:00 - en - Brandon Cullen (1)
Rob Zepp (16 saves / 19 shots)		Goalie stats	Adam Munro (27 saves / 28 shots)

April 26	Erie Otters	3 – 4	Plymouth Whalers	Erie Civic Center
Cory Pecker (12) - 12:24		First period	3:04 - Kris Vernarsky (5)
Carlo Colaiacovo (4) - 15:57		Second period	8:41 - George Nistas (2); 13:46 - pp - Stephen Weiss (6)
Derrick Byfuglien (3) - pp - 1:20		Third period	11:13 - Tomáš Kůrka (7)
Jean-François Perras (30 saves / 34 shots)		Goalie stats	Rob Zepp (36 saves / 39 shots)

April 28	Plymouth Whalers	6 – 2	Erie Otters	Compuware Sports Arena
5:01 - Tomáš Kůrka (8); 14:57 - Kris Vernarsky (6); 18:04 - Chad Wiseman (8)		First period	Chris Berti (3) - pp - 14:12
No scoring		Second period	Nikita Alexeev (7) - sh - 2:57
7:03 - Chad Wiseman (9); 18:30 - Kris Vernarsky (7); 19:40 - Karl Stewart (2)		Third period	No scoring
Rob Zepp (21 saves / 23 shots); Paul Drew (1 save / 1 shot)		Goalie stats	Jean-François Perras (12 saves / 15 shots); Adam Munro (23 saves / 26 shots)

April 14	Erie Otters	4 – 7	Plymouth Whalers	Erie Civic Center
No scoring		First period	Chad Wiseman (10) - 1:28
2:43 - Cory Pecker (13); 3:39 - Sean Dixon (1)		Second period	Karl Stewart (3) - 15:14; Bob McBride (1) - 18:41; Libor Ustrnul (1) - 19:05
10:46 - Brad Boyes (10); 13:23 - pp - Cory Pecker (14)		Third period	Damian Surma (3) - 4:18; Cole Jarrett (5) - pp - 16:52; Damian Surma (4) - en - 18:26
Adam Munro (21 saves / 26 shots); Jean-François Perras (5 saves / 6 shots)		Goalie stats	Rob Zepp (32 saves / 36 shots)

Plymouth wins series 4 – 1

=== J. Ross Robertson Cup finals ===
==== (2) Plymouth Whalers vs. (4) Ottawa 67's ====
May 5	Plymouth Whalers	3 – 6	Ottawa 67's	Compuware Sports Arena
10:40 - pp - Damian Surma (5); 12:45 - pp - Cole Jarrett (6)		First period	No scoring
18:38 - Chad LaRose (7)		Second period	Vadim Sozinov (4) - pp - 0:56; Zenon Konopka (6) - 7:11; Luke Sellars (4) - pp - 10:57
No scoring		Third period	Zenon Konopka (7) - pp - 3:34; Vadim Sozinov (5) - 15:36; Lance Galbraith (13) - en - 19:53
Rob Zepp (24 saves / 29 shots)		Goalie stats	Seamus Kotyk (26 saves / 29 shots)

May 6	Plymouth Whalers	4 – 2	Ottawa 67's	Compuware Sports Arena
10:53 - sh - Damian Surma (6); 14:39 - pp - Chad LaRose (8)		First period	No scoring
1:35 - Chad LaRose (9); 3:03 - pp - Chad Wiseman (11)		Second period	Joe Talbot (9) - sh - 10:13; Vadim Sozinov (6) - 16:02
No scoring		Third period	No scoring
Rob Zepp (21 saves / 23 shots)		Goalie stats	Seamus Kotyk (8 saves / 12 shots); John Ceci (17 saves / 17 shots)

May 10	Ottawa 67's	4 – 0	Plymouth Whalers	Ottawa Civic Centre
0:33 - Joe Talbot (10); 16:46 - Matthew Albiani (3)		First period	No scoring
13:46 - Miguel Delisle (7)		Second period	No scoring
9:38 - Miguel Delisle (8)		Third period	No scoring
Seamus Kotyk (29 saves / 29 shots)		Goalie stats	Rob Zepp (28 saves / 32 shots)

May 11	Ottawa 67's	0 – 3	Plymouth Whalers	Ottawa Civic Centre
No scoring		First period	Damian Surma (7) - 19:08
No scoring		Second period	Chad Wiseman (12) - 8:47
No scoring		Third period	Damian Surma (8) - pp - 6:44
Seamus Kotyk (23 saves / 26 shots)		Goalie stats	Rob Zepp (24 saves / 24 shots)

May 13	Plymouth Whalers	4 – 5	Ottawa 67's	Compuware Sports Arena
3:12 - George Nistas (3); 3:53 - Stephen Weiss (7); 13:37 - Chad LaRose (10)		First period	Sean Scully (1) - 17:28
11:01 - James Wisniewski (3)		Second period	Joe Talbot (11) - pp - 5:01; Sebastien Savage (3) - 11:44; Sean Scully (2) - 13:44
No scoring		Third period	Joe Talbot (12) - 17:38
Rob Zepp (25 saves / 30 shots)		Goalie stats	Seamus Kotyk (34 saves / 38 shots)

May 15	Ottawa 67's	2 – 1	Plymouth Whalers	Ottawa Civic Centre
No scoring		First period	No scoring
6:29 - Vadim Sozinov (7); 10:56 - pp - Joe Talbot (13)		Second period	No scoring
No scoring		Third period	Preston Mizzi (4) - 11:49
Seamus Kotyk (31 saves / 32 shots)		Goalie stats	Rob Zepp (35 saves / 37 shots)

Ottawa wins series 4 – 2

=== J. Ross Robertson Cup Champions Roster ===
2000-01 Ottawa 67's
Goaltenders: (Canada) 1 – Seamus Kotyk; (Canada) 30 – John Ceci	Defencemen: (Canada) 2 – Jeremy Van Hoof; (Canada) 3 – Carter Trevisani; (Canada) 4 – Jonathan Zion; (Canada) 5 – Russ Moyer; (Canada) 6 – Pierre Mitsou; (Canada) 8 – Adam Smyth; (Canada) 9 – Brendan Bell; (Canada) 21 – Rodney Bauman; (Canada) 22 – Luke Sellars; (Canada) 44 – Bryan Rodney	Wingers: (Canada) 11 – Marc Lefebvre; (Canada) 12 – Sebastien Savage; (Canada) 16 – Derek McDonald; (Kazakhstan) 24 – Vadim Sozinov; (Canada) 27 – Adam Chapman; (Canada) 71 – Lance Galbraith	Centres: (Canada) 10 – Matthew Albiani; (Canada) 18 – Sean Scully; (Canada) 19 – Brett McGrath; (Canada) 20 – Zenon Konopka; (Canada) 23 – Miguel Delisle; (Canada) 25 – Joe Talbot; Coach: (Canada) Brian Kilrea; General Manager: (Canada) Brian Kilrea

== All-Star teams ==
=== First team ===
- Kyle Wellwood, Centre, Belleville Bulls
- Randy Rowe, Left Wing, Belleville Bulls
- Branko Radivojevic, Right Wing, Belleville Bulls
- Rostislav Klesla, Defence, Brampton Battalion
- Alexei Semenov, Defence, Sudbury Wolves
- Craig Anderson, Goaltender, Guelph Storm
- Dave MacQueen, Coach, Erie Otters

=== Second team ===
- Brad Boyes, Centre, Erie Otters
- Raffi Torres, Left Wing, Brampton Battalion
- Cory Pecker, Right Wing, Erie Otters
- Kevin Dallman, Defence, Guelph Storm
- Jon Zion, Defence, Ottawa 67's
- Rob Zepp, Goaltender, Plymouth Whalers
- Dave Cameron, Coach, Toronto St. Michael's Majors

=== Third team ===
- Jason Spezza, Centre, Windsor Spitfires
- Steve Ott, Left Wing, Windsor Spitfires
- Nikita Alexeev, Right Wing, Erie Otters
- Libor Ustrnul, Defence, Plymouth Whalers
- Mark Popovic, Defence, Toronto St. Michael's Majors
- Alex Auld, Goaltender, North Bay Centennials
- Jim Hulton, Coach, Belleville Bulls

== Awards ==
J. Ross Robertson Cup:	Ottawa 67's
Hamilton Spectator Trophy:	Erie Otters
Bobby Orr Trophy:	Ottawa 67's
Wayne Gretzky Trophy:	Plymouth Whalers
Leyden Trophy:	Belleville Bulls
Emms Trophy:	Sudbury Wolves
Holody Trophy:	Erie Otters
Bumbacco Trophy:	Plymouth Whalers
Red Tilson Trophy:	Brad Boyes, Erie Otters
Eddie Powers Memorial Trophy:	Kyle Wellwood, Belleville Bulls
Matt Leyden Trophy:	Dave MacQueen, Erie Otters
Jim Mahon Memorial Trophy:	Branko Radivojevic, Belleville Bulls
Max Kaminsky Trophy:	Alexei Semenov, Sudbury Wolves
OHL Goaltender of the Year:	Craig Anderson, Guelph Storm
Jack Ferguson Award:	Patrick O'Sullivan, Mississauga IceDogs
Dave Pinkney Trophy:	Robb Zepp and Paul Drew, Plymouth Whalers
OHL Executive of the Year:	Not Awarded
Emms Family Award:	Rick Nash, London Knights
F.W. 'Dinty' Moore Trophy:	Andy Chiodo, Toronto St. Michael's Majors
OHL Humanitarian of the Year:	Joey Sullivan, Erie Otters
William Hanley Trophy:	Brad Boyes, Erie Otters
Leo Lalonde Memorial Trophy:	Randy Rowe, Belleville Bulls
Bobby Smith Trophy:	Dustin Brown, Guelph Storm
Wayne Gretzky 99 Award:	Seamus Kotyk, Ottawa 67's

== 2001 OHL Priority Selection ==
On May 5, 2001, the OHL conducted the 2001 Ontario Hockey League Priority Selection. The Mississauga IceDogs held the first overall pick in the draft, and selected Patrick O'Sullivan from the USA U17 team. O'Sullivan was awarded the Jack Ferguson Award, awarded to the top pick in the draft.

Below are the players who were selected in the first round of the 2001 Ontario Hockey League Priority Selection.

#	Player	Nationality	OHL Team	Hometown	Minor Team
1	Patrick O'Sullivan (LW)	United States	Mississauga IceDogs	Winston-Salem, North Carolina	USA U17
2	Nathan Horton (RW)	Canada	Oshawa Generals	Dunnville, Ontario	Thorold Blackhawks
3	Jeff Carter (C)	Canada	Sault Ste. Marie Greyhounds	London, Ontario	Strathroy Rockets
4	Mike Richards (C)	Canada	Kitchener Rangers	Kenora, Ontario	Kenora Thistles
5	Corey Perry (RW)	Canada	London Knights	Peterborough, Ontario	Peterborough Petes Bantam
6	Dan Fritsche (C)	United States	Sarnia Sting	Parma, Ohio	Cleveland Barons 18U
7	Anthony Stewart (RW)	Canada	Kingston Frontenacs	Toronto, Ontario	North York Jr. Canadiens
8	Brandon Crombeen (RW)	Canada	Barrie Colts	Newmarket, Ontario	Newmarket Hurricanes
9	Jamie Tardif (RW)	Canada	Peterborough Petes	Welland, Ontario	Southern Tier Admirals
10	Brad Richardson (RW)	Canada	Owen Sound Attack	Belleville, Ontario	Quinte Red Devils
11	Geoff Platt (C/LW)	Canada	North Bay Centennials	Mississauga, Ontario	North York Jr. Canadiens
12	Chad Robinson (LW)	Canada	Brampton Battalion	Vars, Ontario	Cumberland Bantam
13	Matthew Puntureri (C)	United States	Guelph Storm	Wampum, Pennsylvania	Pittsburgh Hornets
14	Lane Moodie (D)	Canada	Ottawa 67's	Oakville, Ontario	Oakville Rangers
15	Frank Rediker (D)	United States	Windsor Spitfires	Sterling Heights, Michigan	Plymouth Compuware
16	Ryan Rorabeck (C)	Canada	Toronto St. Michael's Majors	Oshawa, Ontario	Oshawa Legionaires
17	Ryan Hastings (D)	Canada	Sudbury Wolves	Etobicoke, Ontario	Toronto Marlboros
18	Rane Carnegie (RW)	Canada	Belleville Bulls	Dartmouth, Nova Scotia	Toronto Marlboros
19	John Mitchell (C)	Canada	Plymouth Whalers	Waterloo, Ontario	Waterloo Wolves
20	Noel Coultice (D)	Canada	Erie Otters	Pickering, Ontario	Ajax-Pickering Raiders

== See also ==
- List of OHA Junior A standings
- List of OHL seasons
- 2001 Memorial Cup
- 2001 NHL entry draft
- 2000 in sports
- 2001 in sports

Preceded by 1999–2000 OHL season	OHL seasons	Succeeded by 2001–02 OHL season
