= Halkidis =

Halkidis is a surname. Notable people with the surname include:

- Bob Halkidis (born 1966), Canadian ice hockey player
- George Halkidis (born 1982), Canadian ice hockey player
