= Andy Chiodo =

Canadian ice hockey player (born 1983)

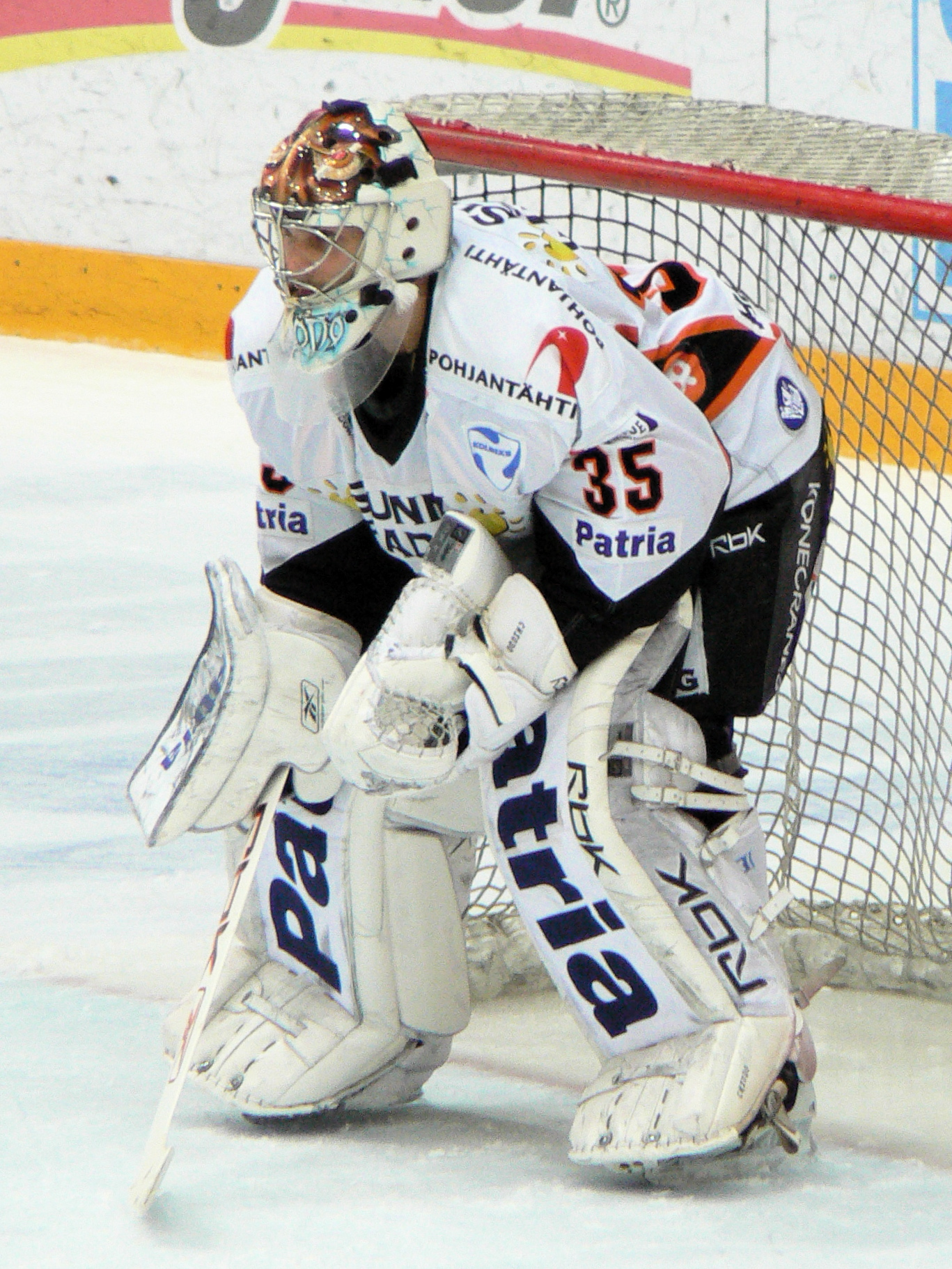
- Born: April 25, 1983 (age 43) Toronto, Ontario, Canada
- Height: 5 ft 11 in (180 cm)
- Weight: 192 lb (87 kg; 13 st 10 lb)
- Position: Goaltender
- Caught: Left
- Played for: Pittsburgh Penguins; Jokerit; HPK; Kärpät; Dinamo Minsk; EC KAC; Tappara; Olimpija Ljubljana; KalPa; HC TWK Innsbruck
- NHL draft: 166th overall, 2001; New York Islanders; 199th overall, 2003; Pittsburgh Penguins
- Playing career: 2003–2017

Andy Chiodo (born April 25, 1983) is a Canadian former professional ice hockey goaltender. Chiodo played eight games in the National Hockey League (NHL) with the Pittsburgh Penguins during the 2003–04 season, for whom he is presently a goaltending coach. The rest of his career, which lasted from 2003 to 2017, was mainly spent in European leagues.

== Playing career ==
Chiodo was originally selected by the New York Islanders in the sixth round (166th overall) of the 2001 NHL entry draft. The Islanders were unable to sign him, and he was made draft-eligible again after the 2002–03 NHL season. The Pittsburgh Penguins chose him in 2003 NHL entry draft in the seventh round with the 199th overall pick.

Prior to playing in the Ontario Hockey League, Chiodo played with the Wexford Raiders of the Ontario Provincial Junior A Hockey League. After playing three seasons in the Ontario Hockey League with the Toronto St. Michael's Majors, Chiodo made his professional debut with Pittsburgh's AHL affiliate, the Wilkes-Barre/Scranton Penguins, in the 2003–04 season. He also appeared in eight NHL games with Pittsburgh that season.

Chiodo has spent most of his professional career with Wilkes-Barre/Scranton and with Pittsburgh's ECHL affiliate, the Wheeling Nailers. He signed with Kärpät in the Finnish SM-liiga for the 2006–07 season, but was sidelined with an injury for most of the autumn. Kärpät released Chiodo from his contract in November, and he signed with Jokerit for a one-month tryout, making his SM-liiga debut on November 16 against HIFK. After only two games, he was injured again. At the SM-liiga trade deadline in January, he signed with HPK.

On August 20, 2009, he was signed by the Ottawa Senators to a one-year, two-way contract. He split time between Ottawa's AHL affiliate in Binghamton and their ECHL affiliate in Elmira. After the completion of the 2009–10 NHL season, Chiodo was not offered a new contract and became an unrestricted free agent.

Chiodo returned to Europe in signing with EC KAC for the 2010–11 EBEL season. He played in 30 games with the team and had a league-best 2.60 GAA. Chiodo led EC KAC to the 2010–11 EBHL Finals before losing to Red Bull Salzburg four games to three. On April 14, 2011, Chiodo re-signed on a two-year contract extension with Klagenfurt.

On November 7, 2013, the Bakersfield Condors of the ECHL signed Chiodo for the 2013–14 season. After just four games with the Condors, Chiodo opted to terminate his contract and returned to the Finnish Liiga with Tappara.

On August 14, 2014, Chiodo returned to the Austrian EBEL, in signing a one-year contract with Slovenian club, HDD Olimpija Ljubljana. In the 2014–15 season, Chiodo appeared in 39 games as Ljubljana's starting goaltender, for 14 wins. With the club out of playoff contention, on January 28, 2015, Chiodo left to play for the remainder of the season in the Finnish Liiga with KalPa.

On April 5, 2015, Chiodo as a free agent, signed with his third EBEL club, on a one-year deal with HC TWK Innsbruck.

== Coaching career ==
Chiodo began a post-playing career as a goaltending coach by joining the Ottawa 67's of the Ontario Hockey League in 2017. He then made a return to the Pittsburgh Penguins organization when he was hired to serve as goaltending development coach in June 2018, where he coached the Penguins prospect goaltenders in the minor leagues. He was promoted to the team's NHL goaltending coach in 2021.

== Career statistics ==
=== Regular season and playoffs ===
			Regular season										Playoffs
Season	Team	League	GP	W	L	T	OTL	MIN	GA	SO	GAA	SV%	GP	W	L	MIN	GA	SO	GAA	SV%
1998–99	Wexford Raiders	OPJHL	26	—	—	—	—	1519	105	0	4.05	—	—	—	—	—	—	—	—	—
1999–00	Wexford Raiders	OPJHL	24	—	—	—	—	1389	89	0	3.84	—	—	—	—	—	—	—	—	—
2000–01	Toronto St. Michael's Majors	OHL	38	18	12	5	—	2069	86	4	2.49	.922	9	2	6	479	30	0	3.76	.900
2001–02	Toronto St. Michael's Majors	OHL	33	14	10	3	—	1743	79	2	2.72	.913	7	3	1	288	17	1	3.54	.888
2002–03	Toronto St. Michael's Majors	OHL	57	26	18	6	—	3065	154	3	3.01	.915	18	10	8	1021	56	1	3.29	.913
2003–04	Pittsburgh Penguins	NHL	8	3	4	1	—	486	28	0	3.46	.892	—	—	—	—	—	—	—	—
2003–04	Wilkes-Barre/Scranton Penguins	AHL	44	18	19	2	—	2448	98	4	2.40	.908	18	9	7	1048	38	3	2.18	.916
2003–04	Wheeling Nailers	ECHL	2	0	2	0	—	86	9	0	6.26	.786	—	—	—	—	—	—	—	—
2004–05	Wilkes-Barre/Scranton Penguins	AHL	14	5	7	1	—	788	43	2	3.27	.879	9	5	4	556	23	1	2.48	.906
2004–05	Wheeling Nailers	ECHL	22	9	10	2	—	1259	47	1	2.24	.926	—	—	—	—	—	—	—	—
2005–06	Wilkes-Barre/Scranton Penguins	AHL	14	8	4	—	2	840	31	1	2.21	.925	—	—	—	—	—	—	—	—
2005–06	Wheeling Nailers	ECHL	17	10	5	—	1	950	45	1	2.84	.897	—	—	—	—	—	—	—	—
2006–07	Jokerit	FIN	2	1	1	—	0	120	5	0	2.50	.928	—	—	—	—	—	—	—	—
2006–07	HPK	FIN	6	4	2	—	0	360	16	1	2.66	.893	9	5	4	609	15	1	1.48	.952
2007–08	HPK	FIN	36	10	20	—	5	—	100	2	2.85	.912	—	—	—	—	—	—	—	—
2007–08	Kärpät	FIN	11	7	3	—	1	—	24	2	2.18	.924	3	2	1	—	9	0	3.01	.899
2008–09	Dinamo Minsk	KHL	26	5	12	—	3	1245	78	1	3.76	.866	—	—	—	—	—	—	—	—
2009–10	Elmira Jackals	ECHL	17	8	5	—	3	954	47	1	2.96	.905	—	—	—	—	—	—	—	—
2009–10	Binghamton Senators	AHL	20	5	13	—	0	933	51	1	3.28	.901	—	—	—	—	—	—	—	—
2010–11	EC KAC	EBEL	30	23	6	—	0	1776	79	2	2.67	.916	17	11	6	—	—	1	3.28	.916
2011–12	EC KAC	EBEL	24	11	13	—	0	1436	70	0	2.92	.920	16	9	7	—	—	1	2.58	.929
2012–13	EC KAC	EBEL	30	16	14	—	0	—	—	0	2.83	.914	2	1	1	—	—	0	3.52	.884
2013–14	Bakersfield Condors	ECHL	4	1	3	—	0	223	10	0	2.69	.900	—	—	—	—	—	—	—	—
2013–14	Tappara	FIN	7	2	1	—	2	370	15	2	2.43	.913	—	—	—	—	—	—	—	—
2013–14	LeKi	FIN-2	11	—	—	—	—	656	—	0	3.37	.910	—	—	—	—	—	—	—	—
2014–15	Olimpija Ljubljana	EBEL	39	14	25	—	0	2245	114	2	3.05	.921	—	—	—	—	—	—	—	—
2014–15	KalPa	FIN	14	5	4	—	5	858	23	2	1.61	.934	3	0	3	—	—	0	3.03	.843
2015–16	HC TWK Innsbruck	EBEL	54	19	35	—	0	3272	172	0	3.15	.900	—	—	—	—	—	—	—	—
2016–17	HC TWK Innsbruck	EBEL	52	24	28	—	0	3136	181	0	3.46	.899	4	0	4	—	—	0	4.03	.883
NHL totals			8	3	4	1	—	486	28	0	3.46	.892	—	—	—	—	—	—	—	—
