= Jonathan Zion =

Canadian ice hockey player (born 1981)

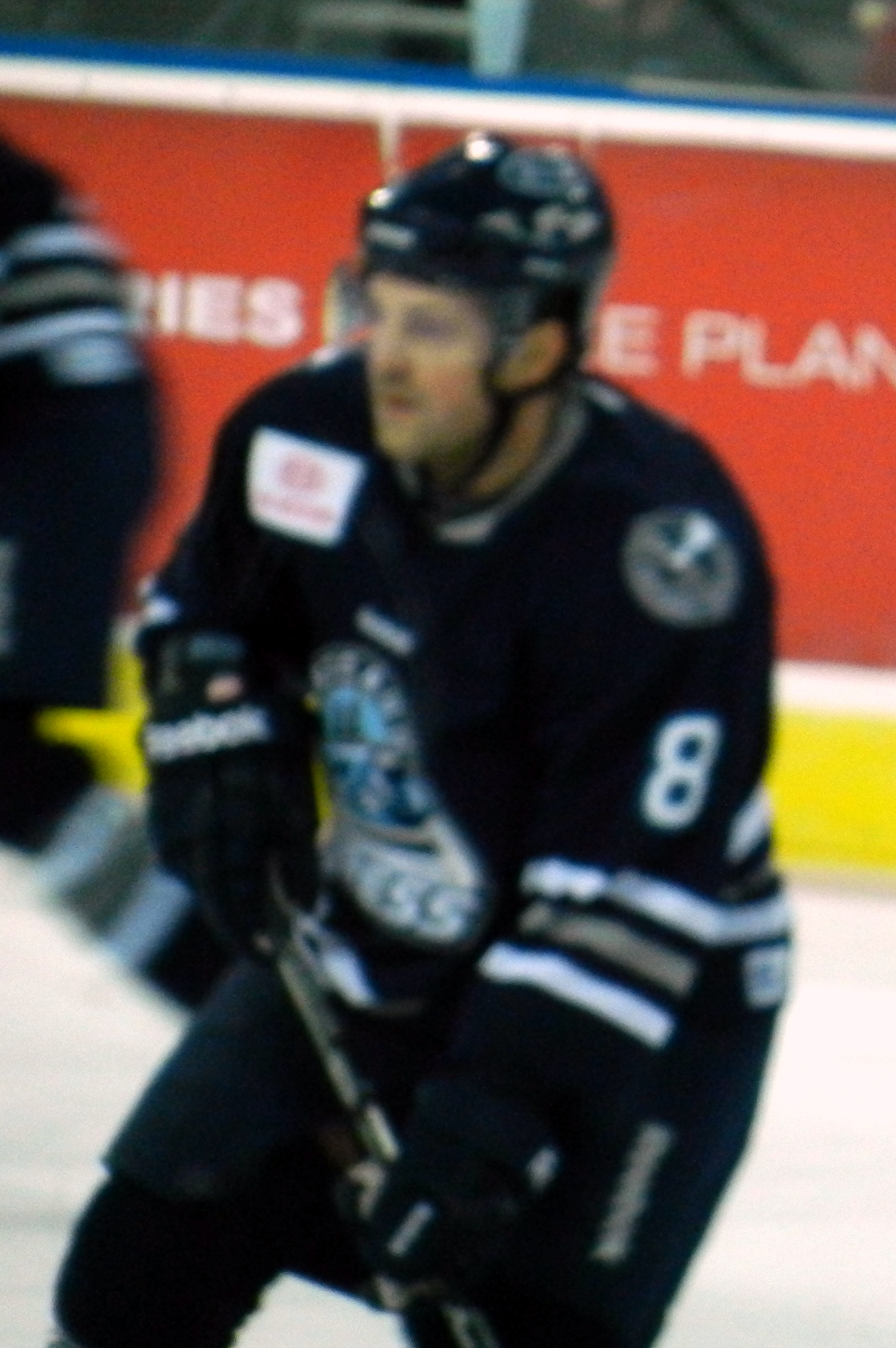
- Zion with the Chicago Express
- Born: May 21, 1981 (age 45) Nepean, Ontario, Canada
- Height: 6 ft 1 in (185 cm)
- Weight: 205 lb (93 kg; 14 st 9 lb)
- Position: Defence
- Shot: Left
- Played for: Cincinnati Mighty Ducks; Portland Pirates; Manchester Monarchs; Syracuse Crunch; Utah Grizzlies; Iowa Stars; HIFK; Vienna Capitals; EfB Ishockey; Stavanger Oilers; IK Oskarshamn; Sheffield Steelers; Nottingham Panthers; GKS Tychy; Tilburg Trappers; Allen Americans
- NHL draft: 110th overall, 1999; Toronto Maple Leafs
- Playing career: 2002–2014

Jonathan Zion (born May 21, 1981) is a Canadian former professional ice hockey defenceman.

== Playing career ==
Zion played junior hockey with the Ottawa 67's of the OHL from 1997-2002 and was a member of the 1999 Memorial Cup Champions. He was drafted in the fourth round, 110th overall, by the Toronto Maple Leafs in the 1999 NHL Entry Draft.

Professionally, Zion played in the AHL teams Cincinnati Mighty Ducks, Portland Pirates, Manchester Monarchs, Syracuse Crunch, Utah Grizzlies and Iowa Stars and the ECHL teams Richmond Renegades, Reading Royals, Greenville Grrrowl and Idaho Steelheads. He also represented several European teams, including HIFK of the Finnish SM-liiga and the Sheffield Steelers and Nottingham Panthers of the British Elite Ice Hockey League.

Zion joined the Allen Americans midway through the 2013-14 season, helping them claim their second Ray Davis Cup championship before retiring.

== Career statistics ==
			Regular season					Playoffs
Season	Team	League	GP	G	A	Pts	PIM	GP	G	A	Pts	PIM
1996-97	Nepean Raiders	CJHL	47	8	26	34	14	—	—	—	—	—
1997–98	Ottawa 67's	OHL	53	4	19	23	20	14	3	13	16	2
1998–99	Ottawa 67's	OHL	60	8	33	41	10	9	2	3	5	8
1999–00	Ottawa 67's	OHL	66	7	52	59	16	11	3	10	13	8
2000–01	Ottawa 67's	OHL	59	22	51	73	38	20	3	19	22	18
2001–02	Ottawa 67's	OHL	52	16	31	47	60	13	0	7	7	5
2002–03	Richmond Renegades	ECHL	58	14	38	52	46	—	—	—	—	—
2002–03	Cincinnati Mighty Ducks	AHL	12	2	1	3	20	—	—	—	—	—
2002–03	Portland Pirates	AHL	6	0	0	0	4	—	—	—	—	—
2003–04	Reading Royals	ECHL	29	6	22	28	12	—	—	—	—	—
2003–04	Manchester Monarchs	AHL	8	0	2	2	6	—	—	—	—	—
2003–04	Greenville Grrrowl	ECHL	7	2	1	3	2	—	—	—	—	—
2003–04	Syracuse Crunch	AHL	11	0	0	0	4	—	—	—	—	—
2004–05	Utah Grizzlies	AHL	2	0	0	0	0	—	—	—	—	—
2004–05	Idaho Steelheads	ECHL	65	7	30	37	54	4	0	1	1	4
2005–06	Idaho Steelheads	ECHL	25	10	19	29	50	—	—	—	—	—
2005–06	Iowa Stars	AHL	5	0	0	0	6	—	—	—	—	—
2005–06	HIFK	Liiga	17	1	2	3	28	12	3	3	6	10
2006–07	Vienna Capitals	EBEL	28	2	10	12	32	—	—	—	—	—
2007–08	EfB Ishockey	Denmark	30	15	20	35	66	—	—	—	—	—
2008–09	Stavanger Oilers	Norway	40	12	20	32	44	—	—	—	—	—
2009–10	IK Oskarshamn	Allsvenskan	15	3	2	5	18	—	—	—	—	—
2009–10	Sheffield Steelers	EIHL	23	8	17	25	6	2	1	2	3	0
2010–11	Nottingham Panthers	EIHL	32	9	22	31	22	—	—	—	—	—
2010–11	Allen Americans	CHL	22	6	14	20	18	13	3	8	11	10
2011–12	Chicago Express	ECHL	40	10	15	25	29	—	—	—	—	—
2012–13	GKS Tychy	Poland	14	1	1	2	12	12	7	8	15	4
2013–14	Tilburg Trappers	Netherlands	2	0	2	2	2	—	—	—	—	—
2013–14	Allen Americans	CHL	13	4	9	13	6	14	1	10	11	13
AHL totals			44	2	3	5	40	—	—	—	—	—
ECHL totals			224	49	125	174	193	4	0	1	1	4
