= Nikita Alexeev =

Russian ice hockey player (born 1981)

- Born: December 27, 1981 (age 44) Murmansk, Russian SFSR, Soviet Union
- Height: 6 ft 6 in (198 cm)
- Weight: 227 lb (103 kg; 16 st 3 lb)
- Position: Right wing
- Shot: Left
- Played for: Tampa Bay Lightning; Avangard Omsk; Chicago Blackhawks; Ak Bars Kazan; Severstal Cherepovets
- NHL draft: 8th overall, 2000; Tampa Bay Lightning
- Playing career: 2001–2013

Nikita Sergeyevich Alexeev, sometimes transliterated as Alexeyev, (Russian: Никита Алексеев, born December 27, 1981) is a Russian former professional ice hockey forward who last played in the Kontinental Hockey League with Severstal Cherepovets. He formerly played in the National Hockey League (NHL) with the Tampa Bay Lightning and the Chicago Blackhawks. He was a first round pick, 8th overall in the 2000 NHL entry draft for the Lightning.

== Playing career ==
Alexeev came to North America in 1998 to play for the Erie Otters of the Ontario Hockey League (OHL). He was drafted by the Tampa Bay Lightning 8th overall in the 2000 NHL entry draft. He made his NHL debut in the 2001-02 season, and split the next two seasons between the Lightning and AHL affiliate, the Springfield Falcons.

Early in the 2003–04 season, Alexeev suffered a major shoulder injury which caused him to miss the rest of the season as the Lightning went on to claim their first Stanley Cup. Alexeev played a season in Russia before in the 2006–07 season, he returned to NHL and was a regular in the Lightning lineup. However, after 63 games, he was traded to the Chicago Blackhawks at the trade deadline. The Blackhawks chose not to offer Alexeev a contract in 2007, making him a free agent.

Alexeev, unable to live up to his draft status, ended his NHL tenure and returned to sign with Ak Bars Kazan of the Kontinental Hockey League (KHL). Alexeev won the Gagarin Cup as champion of the KHL twice with Ak Bars, and scored the cup winning goal in 2010.

== Career statistics ==
			Regular season					Playoffs
Season	Team	League	GP	G	A	Pts	PIM	GP	G	A	Pts	PIM
1996–97	Krylya Sovetov–2 Moscow	RUS.3	45	4	6	10	8	—	—	—	—	—
1997–98	Krylya Sovetov–2 Moscow	RUS.3	61	11	4	15	36	—	—	—	—	—
1998–99	Erie Otters	OHL	61	17	18	35	36	5	1	1	2	4
1999–2000	Erie Otters	OHL	64	24	29	53	13	4	3	7	10	6
2000–01	Erie Otters	OHL	64	31	41	72	45	12	7	7	14	12
2001–02	Springfield Falcons	AHL	35	5	9	14	16	—	—	—	—	—
2001–02	Tampa Bay Lightning	NHL	44	4	4	8	8	—	—	—	—	—
2002–03	Springfield Falcons	AHL	36	7	5	12	8	—	—	—	—	—
2002–03	Tampa Bay Lightning	NHL	37	4	2	6	8	11	1	0	1	0
2003–04	Hershey Bears	AHL	14	0	1	1	8	—	—	—	—	—
2004–05	Springfield Falcons	AHL	72	13	9	22	16	—	—	—	—	—
2005–06	Avangard Omsk	RSL	40	6	4	10	10	5	0	0	0	2
2005–06	Avangard–2 Omsk	RUS.3	6	5	1	6	4	—	—	—	—	—
2006–07	Tampa Bay Lightning	NHL	63	10	11	21	12	—	—	—	—	—
2006–07	Chicago Blackhawks	NHL	15	2	0	2	0	—	—	—	—	—
2007–08	Ak Bars Kazan	RSL	37	3	2	5	26	5	0	3	3	0
2008–09	Ak Bars Kazan	KHL	54	8	7	15	16	21	3	4	7	22
2009–10	Ak Bars Kazan	KHL	33	1	1	2	14	22	4	3	7	3
2010–11	Ak Bars Kazan	KHL	33	3	6	9	6	0	0	0	0	0
2011–12	Severstal Cherepovets	KHL	7	0	1	1	0	6	1	2	3	0
2012–13	Severstal Cherepovets	KHL	23	2	2	4	6	9	2	0	2	4
NHL totals			159	20	17	37	28	11	1	0	1	0
KHL totals			150	14	18	32	44	67	10	9	19	59

== Awards and honours ==
Award	Year
KHL
Gagarin Cup (Ak Bars Kazan)	2009, 2010

Awards and achievements
Preceded by Vincent Lecavalier	Tampa Bay Lightning first-round draft pick 2000	Succeeded by Alexander Svitov
