= Ahren Spylo =

Canadian ice hockey player

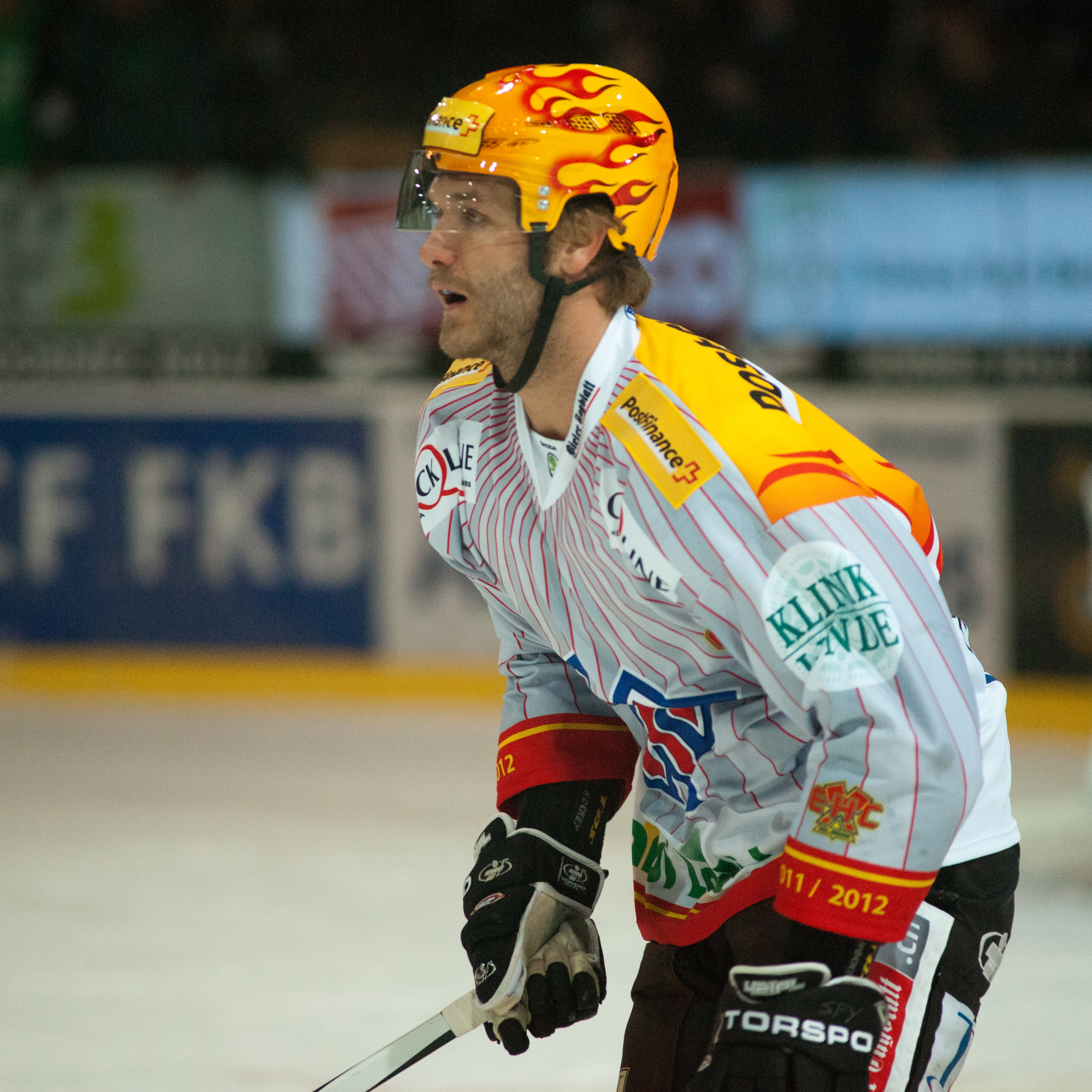
- Spylo in 2011
- Born: December 6, 1983 (age 42) Waterloo, Ontario, Canada
- Height: 6 ft 3 in (191 cm)
- Weight: 225 lb (102 kg; 16 st 1 lb)
- Position: Left Wing
- Shot: Left
- NL team Former teams: HC Davos; Vityaz Chekhov (KHL); Nürnberg Ice Tigers (DEL); Hamburg Freezers (DEL); Fribourg-Gottéron (NLA); SCL Tigers (NLA); HC Davos (NLA); Albany River Rats (AHL)
- NHL draft: 85th overall, 2002; New Jersey Devils
- Playing career: 2003–2017

Ahren Spylo (né Nittel; born December 6, 1983) is a Canadian former professional ice hockey player who last played for HC Davos in the National League.

== Playing career ==
Born in Waterloo, Ontario to a German mother and Canadian father, Nittel (at the time) played junior hockey for the Windsor Spitfires of the Ontario Hockey League. His play attracted the attention of the New Jersey Devils of the NHL, who drafted him in the third round, 85th overall in the 2002 NHL entry draft. In his final junior season of 2002-03, he was traded to the Oshawa Generals of the OHL.

After spending most of three pro seasons with the Albany River Rats of the American Hockey League, he began playing in Europe and adopted his father's name, "Spylo." Since 2006, he has played for several teams in the Nationalliga A in Switzerland, Deutsche Eishockey Liga in Germany, and the Kontinental Hockey League in Russia.

As a member of the Nürnberg Ice Tigers, he was named the Hockey News player of the month in September 2007. He was also selected for the 2008 DEL All-Star Game.

In his third season with EHC Biel, Spylo was selected to participate in the Spengler Cup, representing Canada.

== Career statistics ==
			Regular season					Playoffs
Season	Team	League	GP	G	A	Pts	PIM	GP	G	A	Pts	PIM
1999–2000	Streetsville Derbys	OPJHL	11	1	5	6	10	—	—	—	—	—
2000–01	Windsor Spitfires	OHL	46	6	4	10	56	7	3	1	4	16
2001–02	Windsor Spitfires	OHL	52	19	11	30	100	9	4	1	5	23
2002–03	Windsor Spitfires	OHL	22	5	4	9	30	—	—	—	—	—
2002–03	Oshawa Generals	OHL	20	15	7	22	25	13	5	2	7	10
2003–04	Albany River Rats	AHL	42	4	3	7	24	—	—	—	—	—
2004–05	Albany River Rats	AHL	50	25	11	36	18	—	—	—	—	—
2005–06	Albany River Rats	AHL	45	14	11	25	51	—	—	—	—	—
2006–07	HC Davos	NLA	17	1	4	5	30	—	—	—	—	—
2006–07	SC Langnau	NLA	3	2	1	3	8	—	—	—	—	—
2006–07	Rapperswil–Jona Lakers	NLA	4	1	0	1	4	—	—	—	—	—
2006–07	Hamburg Freezers	DEL	13	5	1	6	8	7	2	2	4	18
2007–08	Sinupret Ice Tigers	DEL	56	41	23	64	56	5	2	2	4	20
2008–09	Vityaz Chekhov	KHL	28	12	7	19	59	—	—	—	—	—
2009–10	Florida Everblades	ECHL	2	1	0	1	0	—	—	—	—	—
2009–10	Adler Mannheim	DEL	34	14	17	31	50	2	1	1	2	0
2010–11	EHC Biel	NLA	49	19	19	38	40	—	—	—	—	—
2011–12	EHC Biel	NLA	45	15	15	30	43	5	4	0	4	18
2012–13	EHC Biel	NLA	9	4	2	6	20	—	—	—	—	—
2013–14	EHC Biel	NLA	47	16	22	38	30	—	—	—	—	—
2014–15	EHC Biel	NLA	45	20	11	31	58	7	1	1	2	6
2015–16	EHC Biel	NLA	35	10	12	22	8	—	—	—	—	—
2016–17	HC Davos	NLA	3	1	0	1	0	—	—	—	—	—
NLA totals			257	89	86	175	241	12	5	1	6	24
AHL totals			137	43	25	68	93	—	—	—	—	—
