= Cole Jarrett =

Canadian ice hockey player

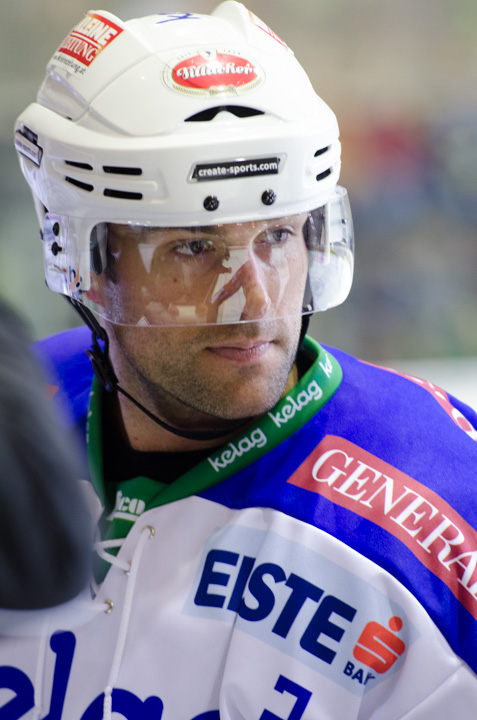
- Born: January 4, 1983 (age 43) Sault Ste. Marie, Ontario, Canada
- Height: 5 ft 11 in (180 cm)
- Weight: 200 lb (91 kg; 14 st 4 lb)
- Position: Defence
- Shot: Left
- Played for: New York Islanders; Eisbären Berlin; HPK; Jokerit; Malmö Redhawks; Sinupret Ice Tigers; Graz 99ers Tohoku Free Blades; EC VSV; Belfast Giants
- NHL draft: 141st overall, 2001; Columbus Blue Jackets
- Playing career: 2003–2018

Rodney Coleman Jarrett (born January 4, 1983) is a Canadian former professional ice hockey defenseman, who played one game in the National Hockey League (NHL) with the New York Islanders. As of 2021, he is an owner and the head coach of the Soo Thunderbirds in the Northern Ontario Junior Hockey League.

== Playing career ==
As a youth, Jarrett played in the 1997 Quebec International Pee-Wee Hockey Tournament with a minor ice hockey team from Sault Ste. Marie, Ontario.

Jarrett played major junior hockey with the Plymouth Whalers of the Ontario Hockey League before he was drafted 141st overall in the 2001 NHL entry draft by the Columbus Blue Jackets. He was later signed to a three-year entry-level contract and played one National Hockey League game with the New York Islanders during the 2005–06 NHL season.

After a year with the Eisbären Berlin in the Deutsche Eishockey Liga, Jarrett signed with HPK in the Finnish SM-liiga. He completed his tryout contract with HPK and subsequently signed another with Jokerit. He was released by Jokerit in January, and signed for Malmö Redhawks of the Swedish second-tier Allsvenskan.

Jarrett continued his journeyman European career in Austria with the Graz 99ers of the EBEL before experiencing a year in Japanese hockey with the Tohoku Free Blades of the Asian League.

Jarrett returned to Austria to establish roots and captain the Graz 99ers for the next two seasons, before signing a two-year contract with EBEL rivals Villacher SV on March 15, 2013.

After two seasons in Villacher, Jarrett returned to Japan as a free agent for a second stint with the Tohoku Free Blades on July 22, 2015. On 26 July 2017, Jarrett moved to the UK to sign for EIHL side Belfast Giants, ending his 15 year professional career with the club.

== Career statistics ==
=== Regular season and playoffs ===
			Regular season					Playoffs
Season	Team	League	GP	G	A	Pts	PIM	GP	G	A	Pts	PIM
1998–99	Waterloo Siskins	MWJHL	48	8	12	20	38	—	—	—	—	—
1999–2000	Plymouth Whalers	OHL	57	3	7	10	47	23	3	7	10	19
2000–01	Plymouth Whalers	OHL	60	12	36	48	98	19	6	12	18	29
2001–02	Plymouth Whalers	OHL	51	14	24	38	92	6	1	1	2	18
2002–03	Plymouth Whalers	OHL	58	14	41	55	138	14	5	6	11	29
2003–04	Bridgeport Sound Tigers	AHL	59	2	14	16	38	—	—	—	—	—
2004–05	Bridgeport Sound Tigers	AHL	61	7	13	20	65	—	—	—	—	—
2005–06	Bridgeport Sound Tigers	AHL	78	3	20	23	88	7	0	0	0	13
2005–06	New York Islanders	NHL	1	0	0	0	0	—	—	—	—	—
2006–07	Eisbären Berlin	DEL	50	7	17	24	99	3	1	0	1	8
2007–08	HPK	SM-liiga	18	1	0	1	53	—	—	—	—	—
2007–08	Jokerit	SM-liiga	15	1	4	5	45	—	—	—	—	—
2007–08	Malmö Redhawks	Allsv	9	3	3	6	36	9	0	0	0	8
2008–09	Sinupret Ice Tigers	DEL	47	1	9	10	76	5	0	0	0	4
2009–10	Graz 99ers	AUT	37	7	17	24	71	6	0	2	2	12
2010–11	Tohoku Free Blades	ALH	34	18	33	51	89	4	0	4	4	20
2011–12	Graz 99ers	AUT	48	7	25	32	98	—	—	—	—	—
2012–13	Graz 99ers	AUT	49	7	27	34	101	5	0	0	0	4
2013–14	EC VSV	AUT	50	14	29	43	52	9	2	4	6	20
2014–15	EC VSV	AUT	39	3	14	17	33	5	0	1	1	9
2015–16	Tohoku Free Blades	ALH	38	13	27	40	139	5	0	2	2	2
2016–17	Tohoku Free Blades	ALH	45	11	35	46	142	5	2	4	6	4
2017–18	Belfast Giants	EIHL	47	3	11	14	48	—	—	—	—	—
AHL totals			198	12	47	59	191	7	0	0	0	13
NHL totals			1	0	0	0	0	—	—	—	—	—
AUT totals			223	38	112	150	355	25	2	7	9	45

=== International ===
Year	Team	Event	Result	GP	G	A	Pts	PIM
2000	Canada Ontario	WHC17	2nd place, silver medalist(s)	5	1	3	4	6
Junior totals				5	1	3	4	6

== See also ==
- List of players who played only one game in the NHL
