= Mark Popovic =

Canadian ice hockey player (born 1982)

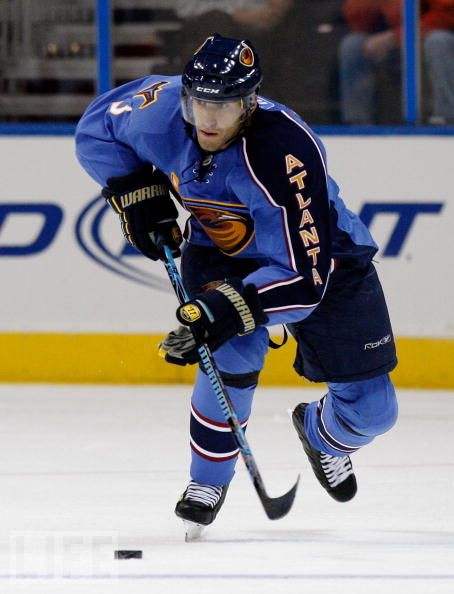
- Popovic with the Atlanta Thrashers in 2010
- Born: October 11, 1982 (age 43) Stoney Creek, Ontario, Canada
- Height: 6 ft 1 in (185 cm)
- Weight: 205 lb (93 kg; 14 st 9 lb)
- Position: Defence
- Shot: Left
- Played for: Mighty Ducks of Anaheim; Atlanta Thrashers; SKA St. Petersburg; HC Lugano; SCL Tigers; KHL Medveščak Zagreb; EC KAC
- NHL draft: 35th overall, 2001; Mighty Ducks of Anaheim
- Playing career: 2002–2017
- Website: popovichockey.com

Mark Popovic (born October 11, 1982) is a Canadian former professional ice hockey defenceman who played in the National Hockey League (NHL) with the Mighty Ducks of Anaheim and the Atlanta Thrashers.

== Playing career ==
As a youth, Popovic played in the 1996 Quebec International Pee-Wee Hockey Tournament with the Toronto Young Nationals minor ice hockey team.

Popovic was drafted in the 2nd round of the 2001 NHL entry draft by the Mighty Ducks of Anaheim. He was traded to the Atlanta Thrashers in 2005. Over the course of his North American career, Popovic appeared in 81 NHL games for 7 points.

On September 21, 2010, Popovic again left the NHL after a single season with the Thrashers and signed a one-year deal with HC Lugano of the Swiss National League A.

After three seasons in Switzerland on June 6, 2013, it was announced that he signed a free agent contract with Croatian club, KHL Medveščak Zagreb of the Kontinental Hockey League (KHL).

On June 21, 2015, Popovic left Croatia and signed a one-year contract with Austrian club, EC KAC in the EBEL. Following two seasons with KAC, Popovic opted to conclude his playing career, retiring from professional hockey after 15 seasons.

== Post-playing career ==
Post playing career, Popovic settled in Castle Rock, Colorado and worked initially as a consultant within the Colorado Avalanche and AHL affiliate Colorado Eagles organizations. He joined the Avalanche in an official capacity as the team's skills coach for the 2025–26 season on August 7, 2025.

== Personal ==
Popovic, is the owner and founder of IGNITE HOCKEY, a hockey development company based out of Colorado. IGNITE provides both on and off-ice development for elite young hockey players. Popovic also owns Perfect Skating Denver, a similar development program for young players.

== Career statistics ==
=== Regular season and playoffs ===
			Regular season					Playoffs
Season	Team	League	GP	G	A	Pts	PIM	GP	G	A	Pts	PIM
1997–98	Mississauga Chargers	OPJHL	51	10	16	26	32	—	—	—	—	—
1998–99	Toronto St. Michael's Majors	OHL	60	6	26	32	46	—	—	—	—	—
1999–2000	Toronto St. Michael's Majors	OHL	68	11	29	40	68	—	—	—	—	—
2000–01	Toronto St. Michael's Majors	OHL	61	7	35	42	54	18	3	5	8	22
2001–02	Toronto St. Michael's Majors	OHL	58	12	29	41	42	15	1	11	12	10
2002–03	Cincinnati Mighty Ducks	AHL	73	3	21	24	46	—	—	—	—	—
2003–04	Cincinnati Mighty Ducks	AHL	74	4	10	14	63	9	1	2	3	4
2003–04	Mighty Ducks of Anaheim	NHL	1	0	0	0	0	—	—	—	—	—
2004–05	Cincinnati Mighty Ducks	AHL	74	1	17	18	47	11	2	3	5	6
2005–06	Chicago Wolves	AHL	73	12	26	38	66	—	—	—	—	—
2005–06	Atlanta Thrashers	NHL	7	0	0	0	0	—	—	—	—	—
2006–07	Chicago Wolves	AHL	65	16	24	40	51	15	3	6	9	4
2006–07	Atlanta Thrashers	NHL	3	0	1	1	0	—	—	—	—	—
2007–08	Atlanta Thrashers	NHL	33	0	2	2	10	—	—	—	—	—
2008–09	SKA St. Petersburg	KHL	52	8	14	22	40	3	0	0	0	2
2009–10	Atlanta Thrashers	NHL	37	2	2	4	10	—	—	—	—	—
2010–11	HC Lugano	NLA	33	4	12	16	20	—	—	—	—	—
2011–12	SCL Tigers	NLA	24	3	9	12	14	—	—	—	—	—
2012–13	SCL Tigers	NLA	11	1	4	5	29	—	—	—	—	—
2013–14	KHL Medveščak Zagreb	KHL	39	2	7	9	20	4	0	0	0	4
2014–15	KHL Medveščak Zagreb	KHL	46	2	6	8	20	—	—	—	—	—
2015–16	EC KAC	AUT	46	5	10	15	31	7	0	2	2	2
2016–17	EC KAC	AUT	50	4	16	20	12	10	1	2	3	0
AHL totals			359	36	98	134	273	35	6	11	17	14
NHL totals			81	2	5	7	20	—	—	—	—	—
KHL totals			137	12	28	40	80	7	0	0	0	6

Medal record

Representing Canada

Ice hockey

World Junior Championships
Silver medal – second place	2002 Pardubice	
Bronze medal – third place	2001 Moscow	

=== International ===
Year	Team	Event	Result	GP	G	A	Pts	PIM
1999	Canada	U18	1st place, gold medalist(s)	3	0	0	0	0
2001	Canada	WJC	3rd place, bronze medalist(s)	7	0	2	2	6
2002	Canada	WJC	2nd place, silver medalist(s)	7	0	1	1	2
Junior totals				17	0	3	3	8
