= František Lukeš =

Czech ice hockey player

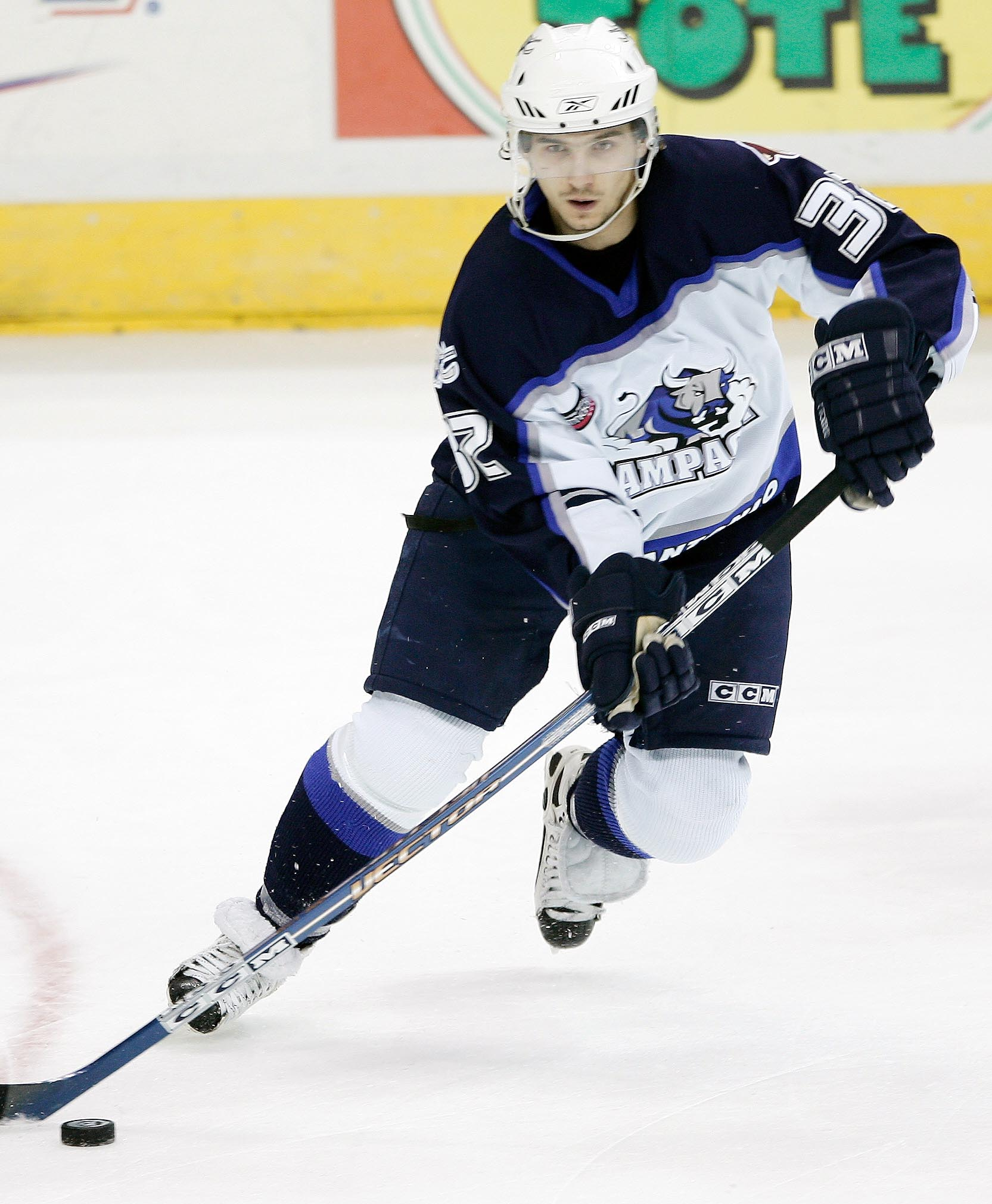
- Lukeš with the San Antonio Rampage in 2006
- Born: September 25, 1982 (age 43) Kadaň, Czechoslovakia
- Height: 5 ft 11 in (180 cm)
- Weight: 176 lb (80 kg; 12 st 8 lb)
- Position: Right wing
- Shoots: Right
- Czech team Former teams: HC Litvínov; Springfield Falcons; Utah Grizzlies; San Antonio Rampage
- National team: Czech Republic
- NHL draft: 243rd overall, 2001; Phoenix Coyotes
- Playing career: 2003–present

František "Frank" Lukeš (born September 25, 1982) is a Czech professional ice hockey player currently under contract to HC Litvínov of the Czech Extraliga (Czech). He was originally selected by the Phoenix Coyotes in the 8th round (243rd overall) of the 2001 NHL entry draft.

Lukeš has played with HC Litvínov in the Czech Extraliga since the 2006–07 Czech Extraliga season.

== Career statistics ==
=== Regular season and playoffs ===
			Regular season					Playoffs
Season	Team	League	GP	G	A	Pts	PIM	GP	G	A	Pts	PIM
1997–98	HC Chemopetrol, a.s.	CZE U18	45	38	26	64		—	—	—	—	—
1998–99	HC Chemopetrol, a.s.	CZE U18	33	23	24	47		—	—	—	—	—
1999–2000	HC Chemopetrol, a.s.	CZE U20	37	14	13	27	32	5	1	3	4	31
2000–01	Toronto St. Michael's Majors	OHL	61	23	33	56	37	18	4	9	13	12
2001–02	Toronto St. Michael's Majors	OHL	63	27	37	64	50	15	7	11	18	16
2002–03	Toronto St. Michael's Majors	OHL	62	27	46	73	55	19	8	15	23	28
2003–04	Springfield Falcons	AHL	63	8	20	28	30	—	—	—	—	—
2004–05	Idaho Steelheads	ECHL	59	18	22	40	30	3	0	1	1	10
2004–05	Utah Grizzlies	AHL	12	0	2	2	20	—	—	—	—	—
2005–06	San Antonio Rampage	AHL	26	1	5	6	4	—	—	—	—	—
2005–06	Laredo Bucks	CHL	40	5	28	33	18	15	5	9	14	6
2006–07	HC Chemopetrol, a.s.	ELH	52	6	11	17	36	—	—	—	—	—
2007–08	HC Litvínov	ELH	52	17	22	39	38	5	0	1	1	2
2008–09	HC Litvínov	ELH	51	21	18	39	24	4	0	1	1	6
2009–10	HC BENZINA Litvínov	ELH	52	21	24	45	16	5	3	1	4	0
2010–11	HC BENZINA Litvínov	ELH	52	14	31	45	24	10	5	4	9	16
2011–12	HC Verva Litvínov	ELH	39	13	25	38	20	—	—	—	—	—
2012–13	HC Verva Litvínov	ELH	50	26	28	54	36	7	3	3	6	6
2013–14	HC Verva Litvínov	ELH	41	9	14	23	12	—	—	—	—	—
2014–15	HC Verva Litvínov	ELH	43	18	22	40	40	17	5	9	14	10
2013–14	HC Verva Litvínov	ELH	50	8	18	26	24	—	—	—	—	—
2016–17	HC Verva Litvínov	ELH	52	16	24	40	26	5	3	0	3	4
2017–18	HC Verva Litvínov	ELH	42	13	21	34	28	—	—	—	—	—
2018–19	HC Verva Litvínov	ELH	47	13	21	34	16	—	—	—	—	—
2019–20	HC Verva Litvínov	ELH	49	12	20	32	26	—	—	—	—	—
2020–21	HC Verva Litvínov	ELH	48	12	20	32	18	3	0	0	0	4
2021–22	HC Verva Litvínov	ELH	41	2	14	16	12	—	—	—	—	—
2022–23	Piráti Chomutov	CZE.3	25	9	30	39	20	—	—	—	—	—
AHL totals			101	9	27	36	54	—	—	—	—	—
ELH totals			761	221	333	554	396	56	19	19	38	48

=== International ===
Year	Team	Event	GP	G	A	Pts	PIM
2000	Czech Republic	WJC18	6	1	0	1	8
2002	Czech Republic	WJC	7	0	1	1	0
Junior totals			13	1	1	2	8
