= Libor Ustrnul =

Czech ice hockey player

- Born: February 20, 1982 (age 44) Šternberk, Czech SR, Czechoslovakia
- Height: 6 ft 5 in (196 cm)
- Weight: 265 lb (120 kg; 18 st 13 lb)
- Position: Defenceman
- Shot: Left
- Played for: Chicago Wolves; Gwinnett Gladiators; HC Karlovy Vary; HIFK; Rapid City Rush
- NHL draft: 42nd overall, 2000; Atlanta Thrashers
- Playing career: 2001–2010

Libor Ustrnul (born February 20, 1982) is a Czech former professional ice hockey player.

Ustrnul was drafted 42nd overall by the Atlanta Thrashers in the 2000 NHL entry draft. He spent three seasons in the organization and played for their American Hockey League affiliate the Chicago Wolves as well as a spell in the ECHL for the Gwinnett Gladiators but never played in the NHL. He then spent three seasons in the Czech Extraliga for HC Karlovy Vary which followed with a brief spell with HIFK in the SM-liiga in Finland. He played one more season in the Central Hockey League for the Rapid City Rush before retiring.

Ustrnul was arrested February 20, 2025 for child pornography possession, according to authorities. He made his first court appearance and detention hearing on Feb. 21, records show.

== Career statistics ==
=== Regular season and playoffs ===
			Regular season					Playoffs
Season	Team	League	GP	G	A	Pts	PIM	GP	G	A	Pts	PIM
1998–99	Thunder Bay Flyers	USHL	52	2	5	7	65	3	0	0	0	2
1999–2000	Plymouth Whalers	OHL	68	0	15	15	208	23	0	3	3	29
2000–01	Plymouth Whalers	OHL	35	3	13	16	66	19	1	4	5	19
2001–02	Plymouth Whalers	OHL	43	1	8	9	84	2	0	0	0	6
2001–02	Chicago Wolves	AHL	1	0	0	0	0	1	0	0	0	5
2002–03	Chicago Wolves	AHL	40	1	1	2	94	6	0	0	0	0
2003–04	Chicago Wolves	AHL	46	1	1	2	68	4	0	1	1	13
2004–05	Chicago Wolves	AHL	27	0	2	2	35	—	—	—	—	—
2004–05	Gwinnett Gladiators	ECHL	17	1	5	6	34	2	0	0	0	0
2005–06	HC Energie Karlovy Vary	ELH	31	0	0	0	98	—	—	—	—	—
2006–07	HC Energie Karlovy Vary	ELH	31	0	2	2	87	3	0	0	0	12
2007–08	HC Energie Karlovy Vary	ELH	29	0	0	0	22	—	—	—	—	—
2007–08	HIFK	SM-liiga	8	0	2	2	31	3	0	0	0	4
2009–10	Rapid City Rush	CHL	21	0	2	2	49	—	—	—	—	—
AHL totals			114	2	4	6	197	11	0	1	1	18
ELH totals			91	0	2	2	207	3	0	0	0	12

=== International ===
Year	Team	Event	GP	G	A	Pts	PIM
2001	Czech Republic	WJC	7	0	3	3	10
2002	Czech Republic	WJC	5	0	1	1	18
Junior totals			12	0	4	4	28
