= Cory Pecker =

Canadian ice hockey player

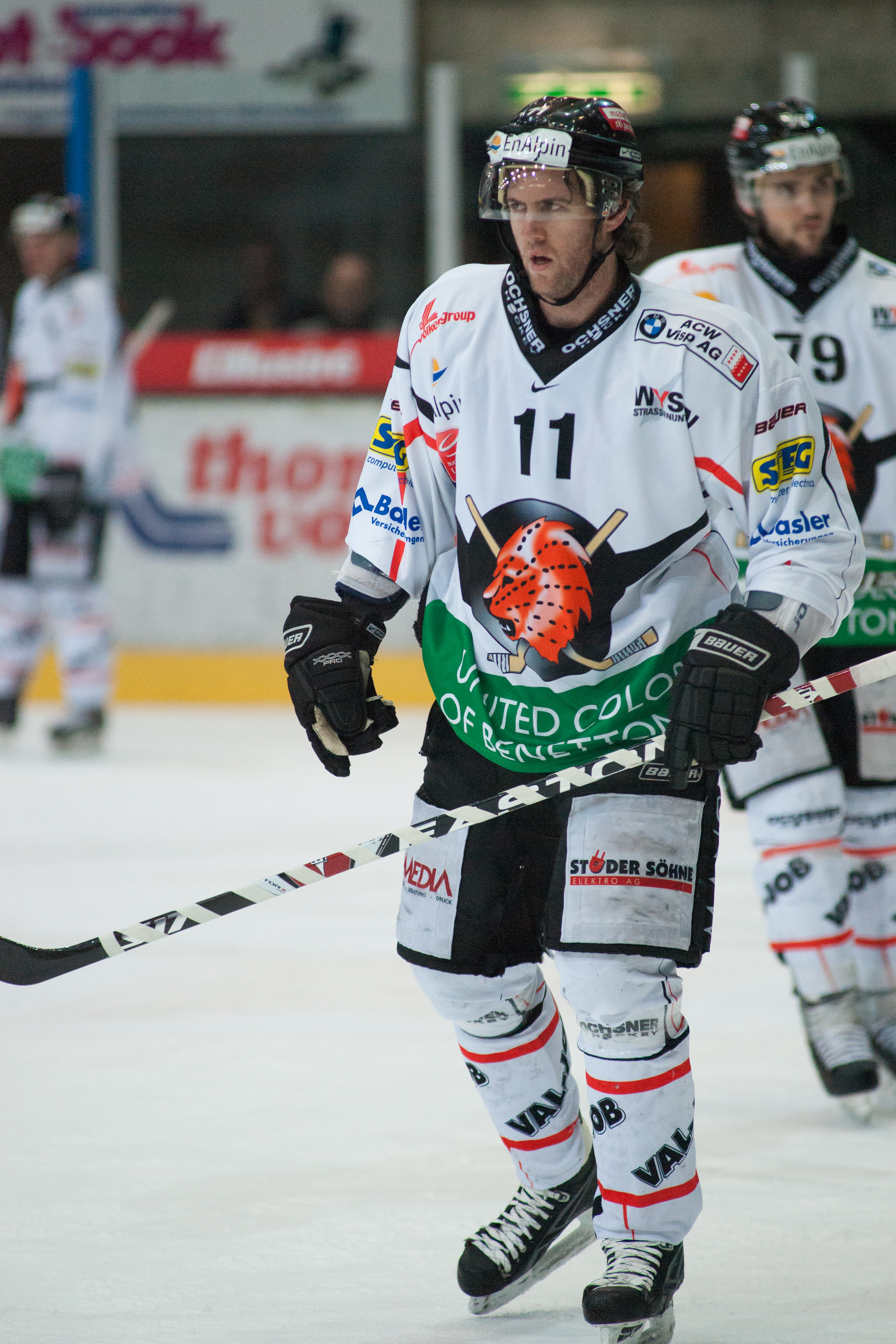
- Born: March 20, 1981 (age 45) Montreal, Quebec, Canada
- Height: 6 ft 0 in (183 cm)
- Weight: 197 lb (89 kg; 14 st 1 lb)
- Position: Right wing
- Shot: Right
- Played for: Cincinnati Mighty Ducks; Binghamton Senators; Manitoba Moose; San Antonio Rampage; EV Zug; Sheffield Steelers
- NHL draft: 166th overall, 1999; Calgary Flames
- Playing career: 2002–2013
Medal record
Ice hockey
Representing Canada
Maccabiah Games
Gold medal – first place	1997 Israel	Ice hockey

Cory Trevor Pecker (born March 20, 1981) is a retired Canadian professional ice hockey right winger who was selected by the Calgary Flames in the sixth round, 166th overall, of the 1999 NHL entry draft.

== Playing career ==
Pecker was born in Montreal, Quebec, and comes from a Jewish background.

At age of 15, Pecker earned the distinction of being the youngest player on Team Canada's ice hockey roster at the 1997 Maccabiah Games held in Israel. Despite his youth, he played an important role on the team, which ultimately triumphed in the competition, securing the gold medal and marking a significant achievement in Pecker's early hockey career.

Pecker spent five seasons competing in the Ontario Hockey League (OHL), suiting up for the Sault Ste. Marie Greyhounds and the Erie Otters. In 2002, he earned OHL Player of the Year honours, even though he missed six weeks of the season due to a broken arm.

Pecker began his professional career in the 2002–03 season with the Cincinnati Mighty Ducks of the AHL. During his career in North America, he signed contracts with various NHL teams, but failed to crack any NHL rosters. Pecker played exclusively in the AHL throughout his time in North America, suiting up for teams such as the Binghamton Senators, Manitoba Moose, and San Antonio Rampage, except for two short assignments in the ECHL with the San Diego Gulls and Phoenix RoadRunners.

In 2007, Pecker took his career overseas by signing with HC Lausanne in the Swiss League. Over the next five seasons, he also played for EHC Visp and EHC Olten. In 2012, he appeared in seven games with the Sheffield Steelers of the EIHL before retiring from professional hockey in 2013.

== Career statistics ==
			Regular season					Playoffs
Season	Team	League	GP	G	A	Pts	PIM	GP	G	A	Pts	PIM
1997–98	Sault Ste. Marie Greyhounds	OHL	29	3	4	7	15	—	—	—	—	—
1998–99	Sault Ste. Marie Greyhounds	OHL	68	25	34	59	24	5	1	2	3	2
1999–00	Sault Ste. Marie Greyhounds	OHL	65	33	36	69	38	12	6	8	14	8
2000–01	Sault Ste. Marie Greyhounds	OHL	31	24	16	40	37	—	—	—	—	—
2000–01	Erie Otters	OHL	30	17	22	39	32	15	14	9	23	16
2001–02	Erie Otters	OHL	56	53	46	99	108	21	25	17	42	36
2002–03	Cincinnati Mighty Ducks	AHL	77	20	13	33	66	—	—	—	—	—
2003–04	Cincinnati Mighty Ducks	AHL	54	6	10	16	32	—	—	—	—	—
2003–04	Binghamton Senators	AHL	14	3	5	8	27	1	0	0	0	0
2004–05	Cincinnati Mighty Ducks	AHL	49	4	8	12	51	—	—	—	—	—
2004–05	San Diego Gulls	ECHL	3	1	0	1	0	—	—	—	—	—
2004–05	Manitoba Moose	AHL	12	1	1	2	8	5	1	0	1	4
2005–06	Phoenix Roadrunners	ECHL	18	11	12	23	39	—	—	—	—	—
2005–06	San Antonio Rampage	AHL	3	0	1	1	2	—	—	—	—	—
2005–06	Binghamton Senators	AHL	24	9	14	23	20	—	—	—	—	—
2006–07	Binghamton Senators	AHL	78	17	30	47	81	—	—	—	—	—
2007–08	Lausanne HC	NLB	45	41	55	96	120	10	4	17	21	33
2008–09	Lausanne HC	NLB	10	4	7	11	47	—	—	—	—	—
2008–09	EHC Visp	NLB	25	22	32	54	38	9	10	6	16	20
2009–10	EHC Visp	NLB	41	40	61	101	34	15	10	13	23	12
2009–10	EV Zug	NLA	1	0	1	1	2	—	—	—	—	—
2010–11	EHC Visp	NLB	32	15	14	29	61	—	—	—	—	—
2010–11	Lausanne HC	NLB	4	2	6	8	0	5	0	4	4	4
2011–12	EHC Olten	NLB	19	8	17	25	6	1	0	0	0	2
2012–13	Sheffield Steelers	EIHL	8	1	9	10	35	—	—	—	—	—
AHL totals			311	60	82	142	287	6	1	0	1	4

== See also ==
- List of select Jewish ice hockey players
