= Luke Sellars =

Canadian ice hockey player

- Born: May 21, 1981 (age 44) Toronto, Ontario, Canada
- Height: 6 ft 1 in (185 cm)
- Weight: 195 lb (88 kg; 13 st 13 lb)
- Position: Defence
- Shot: Left
- Played for: Atlanta Thrashers; Chicago Wolves; Iserlohn Roosters; Jokipojat
- NHL draft: 30th overall, 1999; Atlanta Thrashers
- Playing career: 2001–2010

Luke Sellars (born May 21, 1981) is a Canadian former professional ice hockey player.

== Biography ==
Sellars was born in Toronto. As a youth, he played in the 1995 Quebec International Pee-Wee Hockey Tournament with a minor ice hockey team from Wexford, Toronto.

Sellars was drafted 30th overall in the 1st round by the Atlanta Thrashers in 1999 NHL entry draft, one of the first two picks in Thrashers history after 1st overall pick Patrik Štefan. He played one game for the Thrashers during the 2001-02 NHL season.

== Career statistics ==
			Regular season					Playoffs
Season	Team	League	GP	G	A	Pts	PIM	GP	G	A	P	PIM
1998–99	Ottawa 67's	OHL	56	4	19	23	87	—	—	—	—	—
1999–00	Ottawa 67's	OHL	56	8	34	42	147	11	4	6	10	28
2000–01	Ottawa 67's	OHL	59	9	21	30	136	18	4	10	14	47
2001–02	Greenville Grrrowl	ECHL	21	2	6	8	61	17	7	6	13	44
2001–02	Chicago Wolves	AHL	31	2	4	6	87	—	—	—	—	—
2001–02	Atlanta Thrashers	NHL	1	0	0	0	2	—	—	—	—	—
2002–03	Greenville Grrrowl	ECHL	4	2	2	4	6	—	—	—	—	—
2002–03	Chicago Wolves	AHL	42	4	11	15	117	—	—	—	—	—
2003–04	Chicago Wolves	AHL	32	2	6	8	72	—	—	—	—	—
2005–06	Danbury Trashers	UHL	13	1	4	5	64	—	—	—	—	—
2006–07	Rødovre Mighty Bulls	Den	25	8	15	23	246	—	—	—	—	—
2007–08	Innsbruck EV	Aut	1	1	2	3	4	—	—	—	—	—
2008–09	Jokipojat	Mestis	33	1	14	15	97	—	—	—	—	—
2009–10	Texas Brahmas	CHL	47	4	8	12	154	—	—	—	—	—
NHL totals			1	0	0	0	2	—	—	—	—	—
