= Kris Vernarsky =

American ice hockey player (born 1982)

- Born: April 5, 1982 (age 44) Detroit, Michigan, U.S.
- Height: 6 ft 3 in (191 cm)
- Weight: 210 lb (95 kg; 15 st 0 lb)
- Position: Center
- Shot: Left
- Played for: Boston Bruins
- NHL draft: 51st overall, 2000; Toronto Maple Leafs
- Playing career: 2002–2011

Kristopher Todd Vernarsky (born April 5, 1982) is an American former professional ice hockey player. He played 17 games in the National Hockey League with the Boston Bruins between 2003 and 2004. The rest of his career, which lasted from 2002 to 2011, was spent in various minor leagues. Internationally Vernarsky played for the United States at two World Junior Championships.

== Biography ==
Vernarsky was born in Detroit, Michigan. As a youth, he played in the 1996 Quebec International Pee-Wee Hockey Tournament with the Detroit Little Caesars minor ice hockey team.

Vernarsky was drafted 51st overall by the Toronto Maple Leafs in the 2000 NHL entry draft from the Ontario Hockey League's Plymouth Whalers. While playing for the Whalers, his right were traded to the Boston Bruins for Ric Jackman. He played 17 regular season games for the Bruins, in which he scored one goal and collected two penalty minutes.

Vernarsky's lone NHL goal came in Boston's 6-4 home win against the Montreal Canadiens on February 6, 2003. It was the game-winning goal.

He is married with three children, and resides near Detroit. After retiring from playing in 2012, he became a welder and fabricator, and coached minor ice hockey.

== Career statistics ==
=== Regular season and playoffs ===
			Regular season					Playoffs
Season	Team	League	GP	G	A	Pts	PIM	GP	G	A	Pts	PIM
1997–98	US NTDP Juniors	USHL	3	0	0	0	0	—	—	—	—	—
1997–98	US NTDP U18	NAHL	42	9	10	19	50	1	1	2	3	7
1997–98	US NTDP U18	USDP	23	1	6	7	40	—	—	—	—	—
1998–99	Plymouth Whalers	OHL	45	3	14	17	30	11	0	0	0	2
1999–00	Plymouth Whalers	OHL	64	16	22	38	63	19	3	6	9	24
2000–01	Plymouth Whalers	OHL	60	14	21	35	35	19	7	10	17	19
2001–02	Plymouth Whalers	OHL	59	19	36	55	98	6	1	2	3	15
2002–03	Boston Bruins	NHL	14	1	0	1	2	—	—	—	—	—
2002–03	Providence Bruins	AHL	65	12	15	27	49	4	0	0	0	20
2003–04	Boston Bruins	NHL	3	0	0	0	0	—	—	—	—	—
2003–04	Providence Bruins	AHL	55	8	9	17	61	2	0	0	0	4
2004–05	Providence Bruins	AHL	5	0	1	1	2	—	—	—	—	—
2004–05	Florida Everblades	ECHL	53	16	20	36	47	18	2	7	9	33
2005–06	Motor City Mechanics	UHL	75	10	21	31	100	4	0	0	0	0
2006–07	Chicago Hounds	UHL	34	7	7	14	32	—	—	—	—	—
2006–07	Port Huron Flags	UHL	34	7	15	22	25	4	2	1	3	4
2007–08	Port Huron Icehawks	IHL	69	21	44	65	89	12	4	9	13	18
2008–09	Port Huron Icehawks	IHL	75	21	35	67	96	6	2	4	6	8
2009–10	Port Huron Icehawks	IHL	74	8	24	32	41	7	2	3	5	10
2010–11	Wheeling Nailers	ECHL	51	8	13	21	32	17	1	0	1	8
UHL/IHL totals			361	74	146	220	383	33	10	17	27	40
NHL totals			17	1	0	1	2	—	—	—	—	—

=== International ===
Year	Team	Event	GP	G	A	Pts	PIM
2001	United States	WJC	7	1	0	1	4
2002	United States	WJC	7	2	2	4	18
Junior totals			14	3	2	5	22
