= Carter Trevisani =

Canadian-Italian ice hockey player

- Born: June 15, 1982 (age 43) Hamilton, Ontario, Canada
- Height: 6 ft 1 in (185 cm)
- Weight: 198 lb (90 kg; 14 st 2 lb)
- Position: Defence
- Shot: Left
- Played for: HC Varese; Milano Vipers; Brunico SG; Swe.1; Södertälje SK; HC Asiago
- National team: Italy
- NHL draft: 244th overall, 2001; Carolina Hurricanes
- Playing career: 2003–2013

Carter Vincent James Trevisani (born June 15, 1982) is a Canadian-born Italian former professional ice hockey defenceman. Trevisani last played for HC Asiago of the Serie A and was named to play for Italy internationally four times.

== Playing career ==
=== Junior ===
Trevisani was recruited to play collegiate hockey for Ohio State University of the Central Collegiate Hockey Association for the 2000–01 season. After only ten games into his freshman year, Carter left Ohio State to play more regularly at the major junior level for the Ottawa 67's of the OHL from 2000 to 2003. During his tenure with the 67's Trevisani was drafted 244th overall by the Carolina Hurricanes in the 2001 NHL entry draft.

=== Professional ===
After not catching on with the Hurricanes or any other NHL team, Trevisani went to play in Italy's Serie A first two seasons with A.S. Mastini Varese Hockey and then, beginning in 2005–2006 with A.S. Asiago Hockey. Trevisani then went on to play in Sweden with Södertälje SK. At the beginning of the 2007–2008 season Trevisani returned to Italy to play with Hockey Club Junior Milano Vipers.

Trevisani played the 2006–07 season in Sweden. While in Sweden his team played in the Hockey Allsvenskan Sweden's second highest ice-hockey league. Upon the completion of the season, Södertälje SK were promoted to the Elitserien, Sweden's highest ice-hockey league, for the 2007–08 season. Failing to get an extension with Södertälje Carter returned to Italy and signed with Milano Vipers for one season before joining Brunico SG for the 2008–09 season on August 18, 2008. After scoring 17 point in 41 games he was again on the move as he returned to previous club HC Asiago on August 31, 2009.

== International play ==
In 1999 Trevisani participated in the Canada Winter Games as a member of the Ontario Under-17 team. In 2006 Trevisani represented Italy at the 2006 Winter Olympics and continues to play for the Italian National team in various international competitions.

== Personal ==
As a youngster also played golf and basketball. Trevisani played on the Wilson Golf Tour for four summers.

== Post Hockey Career ==
Having retired from professional hockey, Carter Trevisani now resides in Ottawa, Ontario, Canada with his wife, daughter and son. Since retirement,

An avid golfer Trevisani had finished in the top four of several regional golf tournaments and was featured in ClubLink life magazine.

== Career statistics ==
=== Regular season and playoffs ===
			Regular season					Playoffs
Season	Team	League	GP	G	A	Pts	PIM	GP	G	A	Pts	PIM
1997–98	Kitchener Dutchmen	MWJHL	39	4	10	14	27	—	—	—	—	—
1998–99	Kitchener Dutchmen	MWJHL	14	4	5	9	20	—	—	—	—	—
1998–99	Milton Merchants	OPJHL	34	7	11	18	38	—	—	—	—	—
1999–2000	Kitchener Dutchmen	MWJHL	44	10	26	36	65	—	—	—	—	—
2000–01	Ohio State University	CCHA	10	0	1	1	2	—	—	—	—	—
2000–01	Ottawa 67's	OHL	35	9	10	19	22	20	1	4	5	26
2001–02	Ottawa 67's	OHL	67	4	24	28	96	13	0	7	7	8
2002–03	Ottawa 67's	OHL	67	8	28	36	93	20	0	3	3	26
2003–04	HC Varese	ITA	40	14	10	24	34	—	—	—	—	—
2004–05	HC Varese	ITA	37	4	11	15	28	6	2	1	3	10
2005–06	HC Asiago	ITA	48	6	29	35	52	—	—	—	—	—
2006–07	Södertälje SK	Allsv	44	9	7	16	76	10	1	1	2	10
2007–08	Milano Vipers	ITA	36	6	9	15	83	7	0	1	1	6
2008–09	HC Pustertal Wölfe	ITA	41	3	14	17	58	5	0	1	1	12
2009–10	HC Asiago	ITA	39	5	8	13	48	11	1	1	2	12
2010–11	HC Valpellice	ITA	2	1	1	2	2	9	1	4	5	10
2010–11	Akwesasne Warriors	FHL	36	13	41	54	61	4	1	2	3	2
2011–12	Akwesasne Warriors	FHL	36	7	38	45	40	2	0	1	1	17
2012–13	1000 Islands Privateers	FHL	8	4	7	11	4	—	—	—	—	—
ITA totals			243	39	82	121	305	38	4	8	12	50

=== International ===
Year	Team	Event	GP	G	A	Pts	PIM
2006	Italy	OG	5	1	0	1	8
2006	Italy	WC	6	0	1	1	4
2007	Italy	WC	6	0	0	0	20
2008	Italy	WC	5	0	0	0	8
2009	Italy	OGQ	3	0	0	0	4
Senior totals			25	1	1	2	44

== Awards ==
- Named Rookie for the year with the Kitchener Dutchmen - 1998
- Named Greater Ontario Junior Hockey League Defenseman of the Year - 2000
- Member of OHL Champion Ottawa 67's - 2000–01
- Allsvenskan to Elitserien Promotion with Södertälje SK - 2006–07
