= Alexei Semenov (ice hockey) =

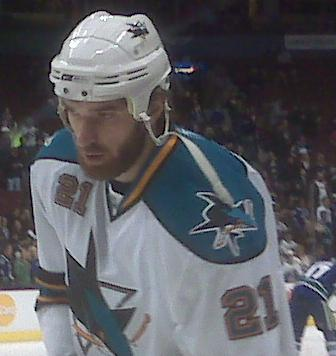
- Semenov with the San Jose Sharks in 2009
- Born: April 10, 1981 (age 45) Murmansk, Russian SFSR, Soviet Union
- Height: 6 ft 6 in (198 cm)
- Weight: 235 lb (107 kg; 16 st 11 lb)
- Position: Defence
- Shot: Left
- Played for: Edmonton Oilers; SKA Saint Petersburg; Florida Panthers; Salavat Yulaev Ufa; San Jose Sharks; Dynamo Moscow; SKA Saint Petersburg; HC Vityaz; HC Sochi
- NHL draft: 36th overall, 1999; Edmonton Oilers
- Playing career: 1998–2021

Alexei Anatolevich Semenov (Russian: Алексей Семёнов, Alexey Semyonov; born April 10, 1981) is a Russian former professional ice hockey defenceman. He played in the National Hockey League (NHL) and the Kontinental Hockey League (KHL). Semenov was selected by the Edmonton Oilers in the second round of the 1999 NHL entry draft, 36th overall.

== Playing career ==
In 2001, Semenov was awarded the Max Kaminsky Trophy as the best defenceman in the Ontario Hockey League (OHL). After playing three full seasons for the Oilers and their top farm club, the Hamilton Bulldogs, he was traded to the Florida Panthers for a conditional draft pick in the 2006 NHL entry draft on November 19, 2005. Upset at his assignment to the Rochester Americans at the start of the 2006–07 season, Semenov left Rochester after four games to play for Salavat Yulaev Ufa in Russia. On July 27, 2007, Semenov signed a one-year contract with the San Jose Sharks.

Semenov was invited to training camp with the New York Rangers for the 2009–10 season and was offered a one-year contract before the season to serve as the team's seventh defenseman. Semenov turned down the contract based on the amount of money offered, countering Rangers General Manager Glen Sather's claim that Semenov's wife talked him out of it after he had already agreed to terms. Subsequently, less than a week later, Semenov signed a two-year contract worth $1.5 million with Dynamo Moscow. The following season, Semenov was again invited to the Rangers training camp, and accepted.

== Career statistics ==
			Regular season					Playoffs
Season	Team	League	GP	G	A	Pts	PIM	GP	G	A	Pts	PIM
1997–98	Krylya Sovetov–2 Moscow	RUS.3	52	1	2	3	48	—	—	—	—	—
1998–99	SKA–2 Saint Petersburg	RUS.3	19	0	1	1	20	—	—	—	—	—
1998–99	Sudbury Wolves	OHL	28	0	3	3	28	2	0	0	0	4
1999–00	Sudbury Wolves	OHL	65	9	35	44	135	12	1	3	4	23
1999–00	Hamilton Bulldogs	AHL	—	—	—	—	—	3	0	0	0	0
2000–01	Sudbury Wolves	OHL	65	21	42	63	106	12	4	13	17	17
2001–02	Hamilton Bulldogs	AHL	78	5	11	16	67	—	—	—	—	—
2002–03	Edmonton Oilers	NHL	46	1	6	7	58	6	0	0	0	0
2002–03	Hamilton Bulldogs	AHL	37	4	3	7	45	—	—	—	—	—
2003–04	Edmonton Oilers	NHL	46	2	3	5	32	—	—	—	—	—
2004–05	SKA Saint Petersburg	RSL	50	0	8	8	26	—	—	—	—	—
2005–06	Edmonton Oilers	NHL	11	1	1	2	17	—	—	—	—	—
2005–06	Florida Panthers	NHL	16	1	1	2	21	—	—	—	—	—
2005–06	Rochester Americans	AHL	3	0	0	0	7	—	—	—	—	—
2006–07	Florida Panthers	NHL	23	0	5	5	28	—	—	—	—	—
2006–07	Rochester Americans	AHL	4	0	0	0	6	—	—	—	—	—
2006–07	Salavat Yulaev Ufa	RSL	20	1	2	3	32	—	—	—	—	—
2007–08	San Jose Sharks	NHL	22	1	3	4	36	2	0	0	0	2
2008–09	San Jose Sharks	NHL	47	1	7	8	57	—	—	—	—	—
2009–10	Dynamo Moscow	KHL	34	1	3	4	30	4	0	1	1	4
2010–11	SKA Saint Petersburg	KHL	18	0	4	4	20	6	0	0	0	12
2011–12	SKA Saint Petersburg	KHL	40	0	3	3	55	12	0	2	2	45
2012–13	SKA Saint Petersburg	KHL	48	2	5	7	44	15	0	2	2	12
2013–14	SKA Saint Petersburg	KHL	43	2	7	9	64	10	0	2	2	12
2014–15	SKA Saint Petersburg	KHL	7	0	0	0	8	—	—	—	—	—
2014–15	HC Vityaz	KHL	37	1	8	9	54	—	—	—	—	—
2015–16	HC Sochi	KHL	44	0	6	6	87	4	0	0	0	31
2016–17	HC Vityaz	KHL	54	2	14	16	102	4	0	0	0	8
2017–18	HC Vityaz	KHL	37	6	6	12	86	—	—	—	—	—
2018–19	Salavat Yulaev Ufa	KHL	42	0	5	5	24	14	1	0	1	41
2019–20	Salavat Yulaev Ufa	KHL	37	1	4	5	43	4	0	0	0	2
2020–21	Salavat Yulaev Ufa	KHL	33	0	2	2	37	—	—	—	—	—
NHL totals			211	7	26	33	249	8	0	0	0	2
KHL totals			474	15	67	82	654	73	1	7	8	167

== Awards and honors ==
2004 National Hockey League All-Star Game

- 2000–2001
  - First Team All-Star in the OHL and a Third Team All-Star in the CHL.
  - OHL Most Outstanding Defenseman (Max Kaminsky Trophy)
- 2009 NHL President Trophy (San Jose Sharks)
- 2010–2011
  - Spengler Cup Winner (SKA St. Petersburg)
- 2014–2015
  - KHL Defenseman of the Month (January)
