= Dan Sullivan (ice hockey, born 1981) =

Canadian ice hockey player

- Born: March 20, 1981 (age 45) York, Ontario, Canada
- Height: 6 ft 2 in (188 cm)
- Weight: 230 lb (104 kg; 16 st 6 lb)
- Position: Right wing
- Shot: Right
- Played for: Lowell Lock Monsters
- Playing career: 1998–2011

Dan Sullivan (born March 20, 1981) is a Canadian former professional ice hockey player.

== Career statistics ==
			Regular season					Playoffs
Season	Team	League	GP	G	A	Pts	PIM	GP	G	A	Pts	PIM
1998–99	London Knights	OHL	18	0	0	0	0	—	—	—	—	—
1999–00	London Knights	OHL	53	9	7	16	139	—	—	—	—	—
2000–01	Mississauga Ice Dogs	OHL	9	1	0	1	4	—	—	—	—	—
2001–02	Owen Sound Attack	OHL	43	10	13	23	50	4	1	1	2	11
2002–03	Lowell Lock Monsters	AHL	5	0	1	1	9	—	—	—	—	—
2002–03	Roanoke Express	ECHL	25	4	7	11	64	—	—	—	—	—
2002–03	Baton Rouge Kingfish	ECHL	21	4	3	7	49	—	—	—	—	—
2003–04	Lowell Lock Monsters	AHL	1	0	0	0	5	—	—	—	—	—
2004–05	Reading Royals	ECHL	4	0	0	0	12	—	—	—	—	—
2004–05	Louisiana IceGators	ECHL	16	4	4	8	25	—	—	—	—	—
2004–05	Augusta Lynx	ECHL	32	5	7	12	72	—	—	—	—	—
2005–06	Augusta Lynx	ECHL	60	18	23	41	203	2	0	0	0	25
2006–07	Pensacola Ice Pilots	ECHL	24	7	7	14	106	—	—	—	—	—
2007–08	Pensacola Ice Pilots	ECHL	33	7	6	13	101	—	—	—	—	—
2008–09	Gwinnett Gladiators	ECHL	—	—	—	—	—	—	—	—	—	—
Career totals			344	69	78	147	839	6	1	1	2	36
