= Fraser Clair =

Canadian ice hockey player

- Born: January 7, 1981 (age 44); Edmonton, Alberta, Canada
- Height: 6 ft 0 in (183 cm)
- Weight: 205 lb (93 kg; 14 st 9 lb)
- Position: Forward
- Shot: Right
- Playing career: 2002–2012

Fraser Clair (born January 7, 1981) is a Canadian retired professional ice hockey forward who last played for the Hannover Indians in Germany. He spent his junior career with the Barrie Colts and the Mississauga IceDogs of the Ontario Hockey League.
