= St. Michael's College School Arena =

Hockey arena in Toronto, ON, CA

Coordinates: 43.684963°N 79.417060°W

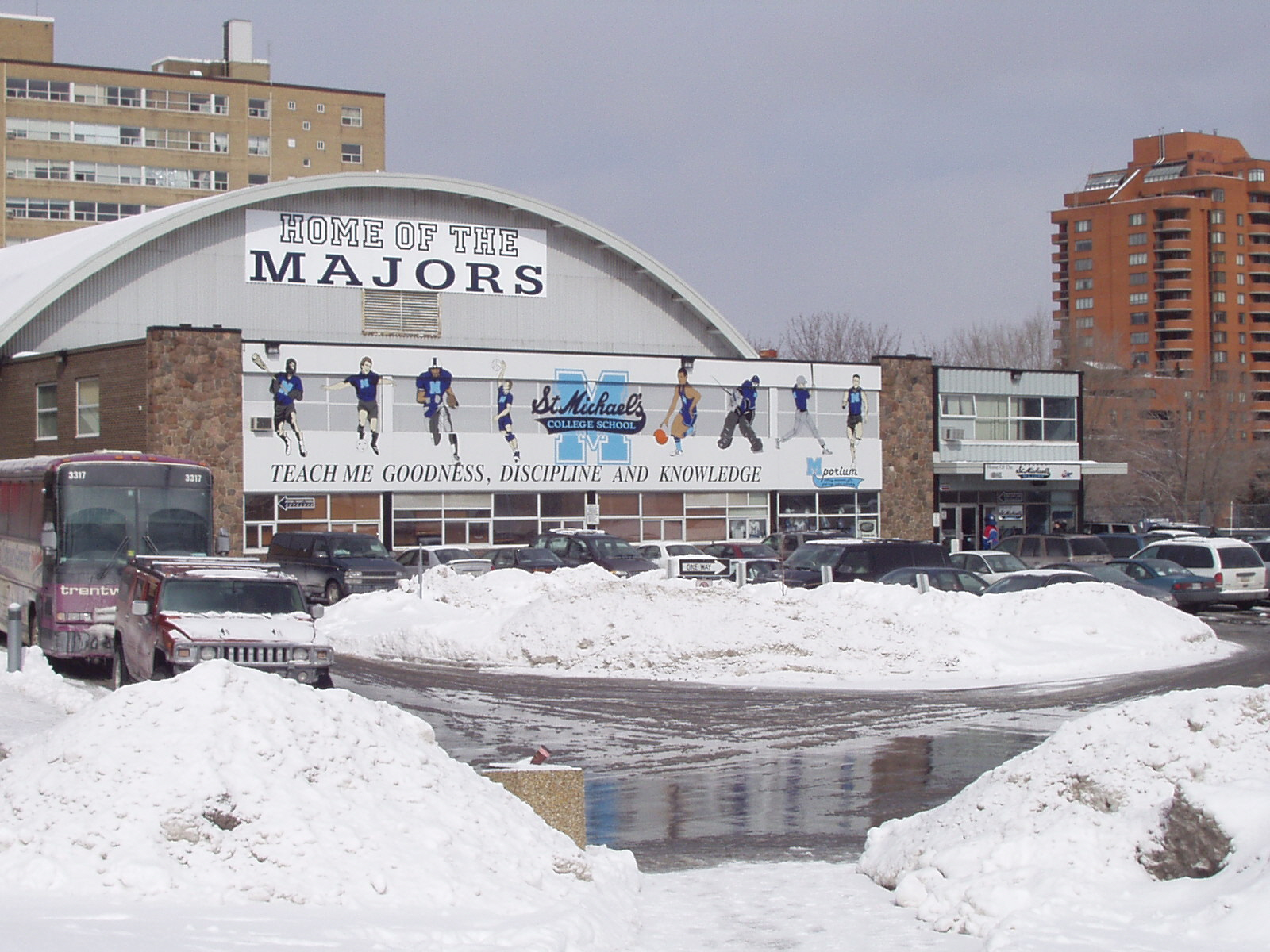
The outside of St. Michael's College School Arena.

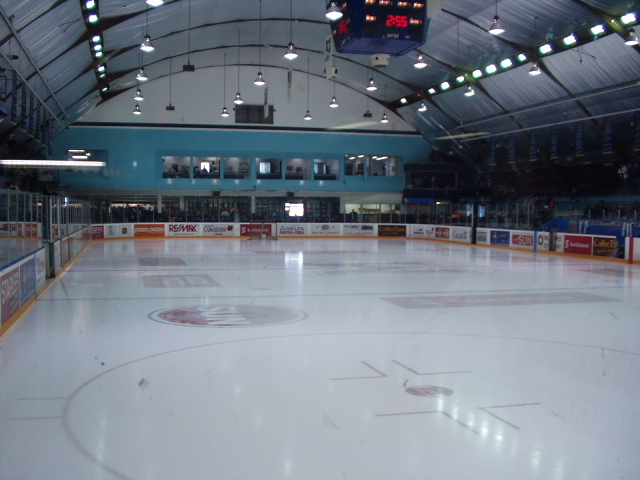
The interior of St. Michael's College School Arena.

The St. Michael's College School Arena is a 1,600-seat hockey arena in Toronto, Ontario, Canada. It was built in 1956 on the campus of St. Michael's College School in central Toronto, and originally was an outdoor rink. A half-cylinder shape wooden roof was finally built over the ice and completed in 1960.

The arena was the home to the Toronto St. Michael's Majors of the Ontario Hockey League. The building was originally supposed to serve as a temporary home for the team following the closure of Maple Leaf Gardens in 2000, but the Majors would be at the College Arena until the conclusion of the 2006–07 OHL season. The team relocated to Mississauga, Ontario and the Hershey Centre for the 2007–08 OHL season.

The St. Michael's Arena is the home of the St. Michael's Buzzers, a member of the Ontario Provincial Junior A Hockey League as well as the St. Michael's College School hockey teams.
