= Seamus Kotyk =

Canadian ice hockey player and coach

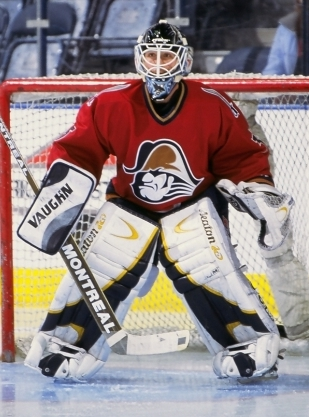
- Kotyk with the Milwaukee Admirals during the 2004-05 season
- Born: October 7, 1980 (age 45) London, Ontario, Canada
- Height: 5 ft 11 in (180 cm)
- Weight: 183 lb (83 kg; 13 st 1 lb)
- Position: Goaltender
- Caught: Left
- Played for: Cleveland Barons; Milwaukee Admirals; Houston Aeros; HK Acroni Jesenice; HC TWK Innsbruck
- NHL draft: 147th overall, 1999; Boston Bruins
- Playing career: 2001–2010

Seamus Kotyk (born October 7, 1980) is a Canadian ice hockey coach and former professional goaltender. Kotyk played professionally for the Cleveland Barons, Milwaukee Admirals and Houston Aeros of the American Hockey League (AHL). He also played in the Austrian Hockey League for HK Acroni Jesenice and HC TWK Innsbruck. Kotyk is currently the goaltending development coach for the Buffalo Sabres of the NHL.

== Playing career ==
Born in London, Ontario, Kotyk played junior hockey for the Ottawa 67s of the Ontario Hockey League from 1997 until 2001. He was a member of the 1999 Memorial Cup-winning squad and played for the 67s in the 2001 Memorial Cup. He was drafted by the Boston Bruins in round 5, #147th overall, 1999 NHL entry draft. In 2001, Kotyk signed an entry-level contract with the San Jose Sharks and was assigned to their AHL affiliate, the Cleveland Barons, where he played three seasons. Though he dressed for an NHL game during the 2003-04 NHL season as a backup, he did not get on the ice, and ultimately he never played an NHL game.

Koytk split the 2004-05 season with the AHL's Milwaukee Admirals and in the United Hockey League with the Rockford IceHogs. With the Admirals, Kotyk scored an empty-net goal against the San Antonio Rampage on April 17, 2005, becoming the eighth goaltender in AHL history to score a goal. He then spent the 2005-06 season with the Houston Aeros and in the ECHL with the Augusta Lynx before deciding to play in Europe.

In 2006, Kotyk signed for the Grizzly Adams Wolfsburg of 2nd Bundesliga in Germany, but played just five games for the team before moving to Slovenian side HK Acroni Jesenice of the Austrian Hockey League. In 2007, he signed with HC TWK Innsbruck and remained with the team until his retirement in 2010.

== Post-playing career ==
In 2010, Kotyk took on a role as goaltending coach of the OHL's Sault Ste. Marie Greyhounds which ended his playing career. A year later, he was promoted to assistant coach of the Greyhounds and remained in the role until 2014, when he moved to the Buffalo Sabres as a scout. In 2017, he became the goaltending development coach for the Sabres.
