= 1999–2000 OHL season =

Junior ice hockey season

The 1999–2000 OHL season was the 20th season of the Ontario Hockey League. The season was the first to award a point for an overtime loss. Twenty teams each played 68 games. The Barrie Colts won the J. Ross Robertson Cup, defeating the Plymouth Whalers.

== Regular season ==
=== Final standings ===
Note: DIV = Division; GP = Games played; W = Wins; L = Losses; T = Ties; OTL = Overtime losses; GF = Goals for; GA = Goals against; PTS = Points; x = clinched playoff berth; y = clinched division title; z = clinched conference title

=== Eastern conference ===
Rank	Team	DIV	GP	W	L	T	OTL	PTS	GF	GA
1	z-Barrie Colts	Central	68	43	18	6	1	93	306	212
2	y-Ottawa 67's	East	68	43	20	4	1	91	269	189
3	x-Belleville Bulls	East	68	44	22	2	0	90	319	227
4	x-Sudbury Wolves	Central	68	39	23	5	1	84	262	221
5	x-Kingston Frontenacs	East	68	38	22	5	3	84	258	245
6	x-Peterborough Petes	East	68	34	26	7	1	76	242	219
7	x-Oshawa Generals	East	68	32	30	4	2	70	227	224
8	x-North Bay Centennials	Central	68	24	35	6	3	57	214	253
9	Toronto St. Michael's Majors	Central	68	18	44	2	4	42	203	281
10	Mississauga IceDogs	Central	68	9	56	1	2	21	160	346

=== Western conference ===
Rank	Team	DIV	GP	W	L	T	OTL	PTS	GF	GA
1	z-Plymouth Whalers	West	68	45	18	4	1	95	256	172
2	y-Erie Otters	Midwest	68	33	28	4	3	73	224	229
3	x-Sault Ste. Marie Greyhounds	West	68	37	20	6	5	85	270	217
4	x-Sarnia Sting	West	68	33	27	8	0	74	211	189
5	x-Windsor Spitfires	West	68	35	30	2	1	73	213	231
6	x-Kitchener Rangers	Midwest	68	28	30	6	4	66	229	256
7	x-Brampton Battalion	Midwest	68	25	28	11	4	65	213	226
8	x-Guelph Storm	Midwest	68	29	34	4	1	63	250	256
9	London Knights	West	68	22	36	7	3	54	186	250
10	Owen Sound Platers	Midwest	68	21	35	6	6	54	237	292

=== Scoring leaders ===
Note: GP = Games played; G = Goals; A = Assists; Pts = Points; PIM = Penalty minutes

Player	Team	GP	G	A	Pts	PIM
Sheldon Keefe	Barrie Colts	66	48	73	121	95
Norm Milley	Sudbury Wolves	68	52	60	112	47
Jason Jaspers	Sudbury Wolves	68	46	61	107	107
Denis Shvidki	Barrie Colts	61	41	65	106	55
Michael Zigomanis	Kingston Frontenacs	59	40	54	94	49
Jonathan Cheechoo	Belleville Bulls	66	45	46	91	102
Raffi Torres	Brampton Battalion	68	43	48	91	40
Taylor Pyatt	Sudbury Wolves	68	40	49	89	98
Jonathan Schill	Kingston Frontenacs	65	39	48	87	79
Mike Jefferson	Barrie Colts	58	34	53	87	203
Brent Gauvreau	Oshawa Generals	59	34	53	87	74
Derek Roy	Kitchener Rangers	66	34	53	87	44

=== Leading goaltenders ===
Note: GP = Games played; Mins = Minutes played; W = Wins; L = Losses: OTL = Overtime losses;
SL = Shootout losses; GA = Goals Allowed; SO = Shutouts; GAA = Goals against average

Player	Team	GP	Mins	W	L	T	OTL	GA	SO	Sv%	GAA
Rob Zepp	Plymouth Whalers	53	3006	36	11	3	0	119	3	0.912	2.38
Greg Hewitt	Sarnia Sting	52	3063	24	20	7	0	129	3	0.924	2.53
Levente Szuper	Ottawa 67's	53	2863	31	14	2	1	122	4	0.924	2.56
Joey MacDonald	Peterborough Petes	48	2641	20	14	6	1	125	2	0.918	2.84
Derek Dolson	Oshawa Generals	40	2259	19	18	2	0	111	2	0.917	2.95

== Playoffs ==
Conference quarterfinals
E1	Barrie	4
E8	North Bay	2
E4	Sudbury	4
E5	Kingston	1
E3	Belleville	4
E6	Peterborough	1
E2	Ottawa	4
E7	Oshawa	1
W1	Plymouth	4
W8	Guelph	2
W4	Sarnia	3
W5	Windsor	4
W3	S.S. Marie	4
W6	Kitchener	1
W2	Erie	4
W7	Brampton	2

Conference semifinals
E1	Barrie	4
E4	Sudbury	3
E3	Belleville	4
E2	Ottawa	2
W1	Plymouth	4
W5	Windsor	1
W3	S.S. Marie	4
W2	Erie	3

Conference finals
E1	Barrie	4
E3	Belleville	1
W1	Plymouth	4
W3	S.S. Marie	1

Finals
E1	Barrie	4
W1	Plymouth	3

=== Conference quarterfinals ===
==== Eastern conference quarterfinals ====
===== (1) Barrie Colts vs. (8) North Bay Centennials =====
March 26	North Bay Centennials	1 – 2	OT	Barrie Colts	Barrie Molson Centre	Recap
Mike Cirillo (1) - 8:57		First period		12:04 - pp - Michael Henrich (1)
No scoring		Second period		No scoring
No scoring		Third period		No scoring
No scoring		First overtime period		8:08 - Blaine Down (1)
Alex Auld (52 saves / 54 shots)		Goalie stats		Brian Finley (24 saves / 25 shots)

March 28	Barrie Colts	1 – 3	North Bay Centennials	North Bay Memorial Gardens	Recap
No scoring		First period	No scoring
Denis Shvidki (1) - 13:51		Second period	5:25 - pp - Scott Cameron (1); 11:36 - Jonas Andersson (1); 15:12 - Mike Cirillo (2)
No scoring		Third period	No scoring
Brian Finley (25 saves / 28 shots)		Goalie stats	Alex Auld (51 saves / 52 shots)

March 30	North Bay Centennials	2 – 3	OT	Barrie Colts	Barrie Molson Centre	Recap
No scoring		First period		15:51 - pp - Michael Henrich (2)
Mike Cirillo (3) - 2:52; Scott Cameron (2) - pp - 6:33		Second period		8:35 - pp - Michael Henrich (3)
No scoring		Third period		No scoring
No scoring		First overtime period		4:12 - Michael Henrich (4)
Alex Auld (41 saves / 44 shots)		Goalie stats		Brian Finley (6 saves / 8 shots); Mike D'Alessandro (13 saves / 13 shots)

April 1	Barrie Colts	2 – 1	OT	North Bay Centennials	North Bay Memorial Gardens	Recap
No scoring		First period		No scoring
Matthew Dzieduszycki (1) - pp - 4:50		Second period		No scoring
No scoring		Third period		6:06 - pp - Jonas Andersson (2)
Mike Henderson (1) - 2:19		First overtime period		No scoring
Mike D'Alessandro (26 saves / 27 shots)		Goalie stats		Alex Auld (34 saves / 36 shots)

April 2	North Bay Centennials	3 – 1	Barrie Colts	Barrie Molson Centre	Recap
No scoring		First period	No scoring
Scott Cameron (3) - 10:38; Mike Cirillo (4) - 12:42		Second period	No scoring
Mike Cirillo (5) - en - 19:36		Third period	4:19 - Mike Henderson (2)
Alex Auld (30 saves / 31 shots)		Goalie stats	Mike D'Alessandro (32 saves / 34 shots)

April 4	Barrie Colts	3 – 2	North Bay Centennials	North Bay Memorial Gardens	Recap
Scott Cation (1) - pp - 4:42		First period	0:39 - pp - Peter Reynolds (1)
Tim Branham (1) - 1:28		Second period	No scoring
14:56 - Mike Dzieduszycki (2)		Third period	Mike Cirillo (6) - 4:46
Brian Finley (34 saves / 36 shots)		Goalie stats	Alex Auld (34 saves / 37 shots)

Barrie wins series 4 – 2

===== (2) Ottawa 67's vs. (7) Oshawa Generals =====
March 28	Oshawa Generals	2 – 3	2OT	Ottawa 67's	Ottawa Civic Centre	Recap
Greg Willers (1) - pp - 15:54		First period		13:52 - pp - Jonathan Zion (1)
Vladimir Repnev (1) - pp - 9:24		Second period		No scoring
No scoring		Third period		14:44 - Matt Zultek (1)
No scoring		Second overtime period		11:46 - Lance Galbraith (1)
Derek Dolson (0 – 1, 45 saves / 48 shots)		Goalie stats		Levente Szuper (1 – 0, 53 saves / 55 shots)

March 30	Ottawa 67's	3 – 2	OT	Oshawa Generals	Oshawa Civic Auditorium	Recap
No scoring		First period		No scoring
Kevin Malcolm (1) - 2:39		Second period		10:06 - Nick Lees (1)
Jonathan Zion (2) - pp - 11:09		Third period		13:10 - Nick Lees (2)
Miguel Delisle (1) - 0:16		First overtime period		No scoring
Levente Szuper (2 – 0, 41 saves / 43 shots)		Goalie stats		Derek Dolson (0 – 2, 27 saves / 30 shots)

March 31	Oshawa Generals	6 – 5	Ottawa 67's	Ottawa Civic Centre	Recap
Greg Willers (2) - pp - 9:08; Brandon Cullen (1) - pp - 19:20		First period	17:20 - pp - Adam Chapman (1)
Brad Ralph (1) - pp - 5:47; John Kozoriz (1) - 12:12; Brent Gauvreau (1) - 12:36; Vladimir Repnev (2) - pp - 14:55		Second period	8:28 - pp - Joe Talbot (1); 11:10 - Matt Zultek (2); 18:58 - pp - Miguel Delisle (2)
No scoring		Third period	13:40 - pp - Luke Sellars (1)
T.J Aceti (1 – 0, 32 saves / 37 shots)		Goalie stats	Levente Szuper (2 – 1, 29 saves / 35 shots)

April 2	Ottawa 67's	5 – 2	Oshawa Generals	Oshawa Civic Auditorium	Recap
Joe Talbot (2) - pp - 10:33; Jeremy Van Hoof (1) - 13:33; Lance Galbraith (2) - sh - 15:22; Russ Moyer (1) - 18:49		First period	12:56 - pp - Vladimir Repnev (3)
No scoring		Second period	12:20 - Richard Spence (1)
Zenon Konopka (1) - 8:43		Third period	No scoring
Levente Szuper (3 – 1, 45 saves / 47 shots)		Goalie stats	T.J. Aceti (1 – 1, 7 saves / 10 shots); Derek Dolson (16 saves / 18 shots)

April 4	Oshawa Generals	0 – 1	Ottawa 67's	Ottawa Civic Centre	Recap
No scoring		First period	No scoring
No scoring		Second period	No scoring
No scoring		Third period	11:28 - pp - Ian Jacobs (1)
Derek Dolson (0 – 3, 31 saves / 32 shots)		Goalie stats	Levente Szuper (4 – 1, 38 saves / 38 shots)

Ottawa wins series 4 – 1

===== (3) Belleville Bulls vs. (6) Peterborough Petes =====
March 27	Peterborough Petes	2 – 4	Belleville Bulls	Yardmen Arena	Recap
No scoring		First period	14:36 - Kyle Wellwood (1)
Jamie Chamberlain (1) - 5:08; Brad Self (1) - 5:37		Second period	No scoring
No scoring		Third period	7:20 - Mike Renzi (1); 11:27 - Kevin Baker (1); 19:52 - en - Mark Chaplin (1)
Joey MacDonald (0 – 1, 27 saves / 30 shots)		Goalie stats	Cory Campbell (1 – 0, 20 saves / 22 shots)

March 30	Belleville Bulls	8 – 3	Peterborough Petes	Peterborough Memorial Centre	Recap
Branko Radivojevic (1) - 18:56		First period	11:39 - T.J. Eason (1)
Kyle Wellwood (2) - 3:16; Mark Chaplin (2) - pp - 4:18; Mike Renzi (2) - 8:27		Second period	No scoring
Justin Papineau (1) - 4:28; Randy Rowe (1) - 7:00; Justin Papineau (2) - 10:01; Mike Renzi (3) - 18:17		Third period	14:45 - Jamie Chamberlain (2); 18:05 - pp - Jason Williams (1)
Cory Campbell (2 – 0, 32 saves / 35 shots)		Goalie stats	Joey MacDonald (0 – 2, 22 saves / 26 shots); Mike Pickard (13 saves / 17 shots)

April 1	Peterborough Petes	2 – 4	Belleville Bulls	Yardmen Arena	Recap
No scoring		First period	No scoring
Marcel Rodman (1) - 6:46		Second period	2:46 - Jonathan Cheechoo (1); 11:27 - pp - Kevin Baker (2); 16:18 - Chris Stanley (1); 17:56 - Jonathan Cheechoo (2)
Jason Williams (2) - pp - 2:50		Third period	No scoring
Joey MacDonald (0 – 3, 29 saves / 33 shots)		Goalie stats	Corey Batten (1 – 0, 27 saves / 29 shots)

April 2	Belleville Bulls	0 – 3	Peterborough Petes	Peterborough Memorial Centre	Recap
No scoring		First period	5:42 - Preston Mizzi (1); 8:00 - Adam Dewan (1); 19:06 - sh - Kurtis Foster (1)
No scoring		Second period	No scoring
No scoring		Third period	No scoring
Corey Batten (1 – 1, 23 saves / 26 shots)		Goalie stats	Joey MacDonald (1 – 3, 31 saves / 31 shots)

April 4	Peterborough Petes	2 – 6	Belleville Bulls	Yardmen Arena	Recap
Bob Crummer (1) - 1:32		First period	3:06 - pp - Mike Chaplin (3); 16:38 - pp - David Cornacchia (1)
No scoring		Second period	11:15 - Randy Rowe (2)
Brad Self (2) - pp - 12:33		Third period	11:33 - sh - Justin Papineau (3); 17:26 - Randy Rowe (3); 17:49 - en - Kevin Baker (3)
Joey MacDonald (1 – 4, 27 saves / 32 shots)		Goalie stats	Cory Campbell (3 – 0, 35 saves / 37 shots)

Belleville wins series 4 – 1

===== (4) Sudbury Wolves vs. (5) Kingston Frontenacs =====
March 26	Kingston Frontenacs	2 – 3	Sudbury Wolves	Sudbury Community Arena	Recap
No scoring		First period	5:16 - Derek MacKenzie (1)
Andrew Ianiero (1) - pp - 18:01		Second period	1:16 - Jason Jaspers (1); 10:17 - pp - Norm Milley (1)
Andrew Ianiero (2) - 15:19		Third period	No scoring
Andrew Raycroft (0 – 1, 38 saves / 41 shots)		Goalie stats	Mike Gorman (1 – 0, 28 saves / 30 shots)

March 27	Kingston Frontenacs	2 – 6	Sudbury Wolves	Sudbury Community Arena	Recap
No scoring		First period	13:59 - Dennis Wideman (1); 17:30 - pp - Taylor Pyatt (1); 18:15 - Tom Kostopoulos (1)
Travis Lisabeth (1) - 1:14; Travis Lisabeth (2) - 5:43		Second period	2:40 - Norm Milley (2); 12:23 - Jerry Connell (1)
No scoring		Third period	8:51 - sh - Jason Jaspers (2)
Andrew Raycroft (0 – 2, 38 saves / 44 shots)		Goalie stats	Mike Gorman (2 – 0, 42 saves / 44 shots)

March 30	Sudbury Wolves	3 – 6	Kingston Frontenacs	Kingston Memorial Centre	Recap
Norm Milley (3) - pp - 3:51		First period	9:50 - pp - Andrew Ianiero (3); 17:57 - Sean Avery (1)
Norm Milley (4) - 18:36		Second period	7:52 - pp - Brett Clouthier (1); 9:28 - pp - Brett Clouthier (2); 10:48 - Jonathan Schill (1)
Taylor Pyatt (2) - 3:37		Third period	18:54 - en - Andrew Ianiero (4)
Mike Gorman (2 – 1, 37 saves / 42 shots)		Goalie stats	Andrew Raycroft (1 – 2, 48 saves / 51 shots)

March 31	Sudbury Wolves	6 – 2	Kingston Frontenacs	Kingston Memorial Centre	Recap
Taylor Pyatt (3) - pp - 8:54; Alexei Semenov (1) - pp - 16:38		First period	7:11 - pp - Andrew Ianiero (5)
Taylor Pyatt (4) - pp - 13:22; Norm Milley (5) - 17:22		Second period	16:25 - pp - Sean Avery (2)
Jerry Connell (2) - 14:46; Norm Milley (6) - 15:38		Third period	No scoring
Mike Gorman (3 – 1, 39 saves / 41 shots)		Goalie stats	Andrew Raycroft (1 – 3, 37 saves / 43 shots)

April 3	Kingston Frontenacs	1 – 3	Sudbury Wolves	Sudbury Community Arena	Recap
No scoring		First period	8:31 - Taylor Pyatt (5); 13:31 - pp - Taylor Pyatt (6)
Darryl Knight (1) - pp - 12:14		Second period	No scoring
No scoring		Third period	14:58 - Derek MacKenzie (2)
Andrew Raycroft (1 – 4, 42 saves / 45 shots)		Goalie stats	Mike Gorman (4 – 1, 24 saves / 25 shots)

Sudbury wins series 4 – 1

==== Western conference quarterfinals ====
===== (1) Plymouth Whalers vs. (8) Guelph Storm =====
March 25	Guelph Storm	5 – 2	Plymouth Whalers	Compuware Sports Arena	Recap
No scoring		First period	No scoring
Eric Beaudoin (1) - 11:26; Kent McDonell (1) - 16:04		Second period	No scoring
Kevin Mitchell (1) - 3:32; Eric Beaudoin (2) - pp - 11:24; Eric Beaudoin (3) - 19:22		Third period	0:12 - pp - Randy Fitzgerald (1); 3:10 - pp - Stephen Weiss (1)
Chris Madden (1 – 0, 33 saves / 35 shots)		Goalie stats	Rob Zepp (0 – 1, 35 saves / 40 shots)

March 27	Plymouth Whalers	1 – 4	Guelph Storm	Guelph Memorial Gardens	Recap
Shaun Fisher (1) - 15:32		First period	2:07 - Brent Kelly (1); 14:11 - Lindsay Plunkett (1)
No scoring		Second period	18:01 - Matthew House (1)
No scoring		Third period	19:37 - en - Lindsay Plunkett (2)
Rob Zepp (0 – 2, 19 saves / 22 shots)		Goalie stats	Chris Madden (2 – 0, 40 saves / 41 shots)

March 29	Guelph Storm	0 – 8	Plymouth Whalers	Compuware Sports Arena	Recap
No scoring		First period	7:25 - Stephen Weiss (2); 12:55 - pp - Justin Williams (1); 19:03 - Randy Fitzgerald (2)
No scoring		Second period	6:17 - Justin Williams (2); 8:16 - Justin Williams (3); 13:52 - Damian Surma (1); 17:44 - Stephen Weiss (3)
No scoring		Third period	0:52 - pp - Stephen Weiss (4)
Chris Madden (2 – 1, 27 saves / 32 shots); Craig Anderson (15 saves / 18 shots)		Goalie stats	Rob Zepp (1 – 2, 31 saves / 31 shots)

March 31	Plymouth Whalers	3 – 2	Guelph Storm	Guelph Memorial Gardens	Recap
Justin Williams (4) - sh - 19:59		First period	No scoring
Randy Fitzgerald (3) - pp - 4:11		Second period	1:38 - pp - Charlie Stephens (1); 14:47 - Bohuslav Subr (1)
Randy Fitzgerald (4) - 7:08		Third period	No scoring
Rob Zepp (2 – 2, 42 saves / 44 shots)		Goalie stats	Chris Madden (2 – 2, 33 saves / 36 shots)

April 1	Guelph Storm	3 – 5	Plymouth Whalers	Compuware Sports Arena	Recap
No scoring		First period	0:50 - Justin Williams (5); 13:58 - pp - Justin Williams (6); 18:00 - Justin Williams (7)
Brent Kelly (2) - 13:37; Brent Kelly (3) - 16:27		Second period	4:21 - Shaun Fisher (2)
Brent Kelly (4) - 9:54		Third period	19:15 - en - Eric Gooldy (1)
Chris Madden (8 saves / 11 shots); Craig Anderson (0 – 1, 18 saves / 19 shots)		Goalie stats	Rob Zepp (3 – 2, 26 saves / 29 shots)

April 4	Plymouth Whalers	5 – 1	Guelph Storm	Guelph Memorial Gardens	Recap
Justin Williams (8) - 5:09; Kristopher Vernarsky (1) - 14:19; Stephen Weiss (5) - 16:03		First period	No scoring
Stephen Weiss (6) - 0:59		Second period	19:57 - Joe Gerbe (1)
Steven Morris (1) - 13:26		Third period	No scoring
Rob Zepp (4 – 2, 32 saves / 33 shots)		Goalie stats	Chris Madden (2 – 3, 12 saves / 16 shots); Craig Anderson (17 saves / 18 shots)

Plymouth wins series 4 – 2

===== (2) Erie Otters vs. (7) Brampton Battalion =====
March 25	Brampton Battalion	5 – 2	Erie Otters	Erie Civic Center	Recap
Raffi Torres (1) - 11:43; Chris Rowan (1) - 12:52		First period	No scoring
Rostislav Klesla (1) - pp - 14:34		Second period	4:09 - Mike Nelson (1)
Jeff Bateman (1) - 9:50; Raffi Torres (2) - en - 19:44		Third period	3:11 - Jason Baird (1)
David Chant (1 – 0, 35 saves / 37 shots)		Goalie stats	J.F. Perras (0 – 1, 21 saves / 25 shots)

March 28	Erie Otters	2 – 0	Brampton Battalion	Brampton Centre	Recap
No scoring		First period	No scoring
No scoring		Second period	No scoring
Brad Boyes (1) - 7:46; Nikita Alexeev (1) - 12:11		Third period	No scoring
J.F. Perras (1 – 1, 36 saves / 36 shots)		Goalie stats	David Chant (1 – 1, 32 saves / 34 shots)

March 30	Brampton Battalion	3 – 4	Erie Otters	Erie Civic Center	Recap
Adam Van Leusen (1) - pp - 15:49; Adam Van Leusen (2) - 18:52		First period	1:45 - Brad Boyes (2)
Raffi Torres (3) - 18:22		Second period	5:03 - Brad Boyes (3)
No scoring		Third period	6:24 - Riley Moher (1); 17:55 - pp - Carlo Colaiacovo (1)
Scott Della Vedova (0 – 1, 34 saves / 38 shots)		Goalie stats	J.F. Perras (2 – 1, 26 saves / 29 shots)

March 31	Erie Otters	0 – 3	Brampton Battalion	Brampton Centre	Recap
No scoring		First period	5:37 - Lukas Havel (1)
No scoring		Second period	4:35 - Raffi Torres (4)
No scoring		Third period	5:14 - pp - Lukas Havel (2)
J.F. Perras (2 – 2, 27 saves / 30 shots)		Goalie stats	David Chant (2 – 1, 32 saves / 32 shots)

April 2	Brampton Battalion	2 – 6	Erie Otters	Erie Civic Center	Recap
No scoring		First period	2:23 - pp - Jason Baird (2); 9:47 - sh - Brad Boyes (4)
Jeff Bateman (2) - pp - 6:46; Lukas Havel (3) - 13:15		Second period	4:27 - pp - Brad Boyes (5); 15:06 - Mike Nelson (2)
No scoring		Third period	2:48 - Jason Baird (3); 17:56 - pp - Nikita Alexeev (2)
David Chant (2 – 2, 32 saves / 38 shots)		Goalie stats	J.F. Perras (3 – 2, 32 saves / 34 shots)

April 4	Erie Otters	5 – 2	Brampton Battalion	Brampton Centre	Recap
Michael Rupp (1) - 13:13		First period	No scoring
No scoring		Second period	1:07 - pp - Raffi Torres (5); 1:47 - Nathan Herrington (1)
Shane Nash (1) - 12:18; Brad Yeo (1) - 16:06; Jason Baird (4) - 18:31; Michael Rupp (2) - en - 19:06		Third period	No scoring
J.F. Perras (4 – 2, 26 saves / 28 shots)		Goalie stats	David Chant (2 – 3, 30 saves / 34 shots)

Erie wins series 4 – 2

===== (3) Sault Ste. Marie Greyhounds vs. (6) Kitchener Rangers =====
March 26	Kitchener Rangers	1 – 4	Sault Ste. Marie Greyhounds	Sault Memorial Gardens	Recap
No scoring		First period	11:43 - pp - Cory Pecker (1)
No scoring		Second period	9:34 - Paul Ballantyne (1)
Matt Armstrong (1) - pp - 19:15		Third period	7:19 - Ryan Jardine (1); 9:22 - Chad Spurr (1)
Reg Bourcier (0 – 1, 47 saves / 51 shots)		Goalie stats	Jason Flick (1 – 0, 24 saves / 25 shots)

March 27	Kitchener Rangers	5 – 6	OT	Sault Ste. Marie Greyhounds	Sault Memorial Gardens	Recap
Brandon Merli (1) - pp - 3:27; Derek Roy (1) - 6:52		First period		0:57 - sh - Chad Spurr (2); 3:06 - pp - Chad Spurr (3)
Brandon Merli (2) - pp - 4:31; Mike Wehrstedt (1) - 5:19		Second period		7:37 - pp - Josef Vasicek (1)
Mike Wehrstedt (2) - 6:05		Third period		8:49 - pp - Paul Ballantyne (2); 15:32 - sh - Ryan Jardine (2)
No scoring		First overtime period		15:11 - Cory Pecker (2)
Reg Bourcier (0 – 2, 42 saves / 48 shots)		Goalie stats		Jason Flick (19 saves / 23 shots); Ray Emery (1 – 0, 19 saves / 20 shots)

March 30	Sault Ste. Marie Greyhounds	6 – 3	Kitchener Rangers	Kitchener Memorial Auditorium	Recap
John Osborne (1) - 4:41; Rob Chapman (1) - 8:16; Ryan Healy (1) - pp - 18:29		First period	2:30 - pp - Derek Roy (2); 12:09 - pp - Derek Roy (3)
Josef Vasicek (2) - sh - 6:39; Daniel Passero (1) - pp - 18:03		Second period	14:41 - pp - Ryan Held (1)
Chad Spurr (4) - en - 19:52		Third period	No scoring
Ray Emery (2 – 0, 31 saves / 34 shots)		Goalie stats	Reg Bourcier (16 saves / 19 shots); Scott Dickie (0 – 1, 30 saves / 32 shots)

March 31	Sault Ste. Marie Greyhounds	2 – 5	Kitchener Rangers	Kitchener Memorial Auditorium	Recap
No scoring		First period	19:04 - Matt Armstrong (2)
No scoring		Second period	12:23 - pp - Ryan Held (2)
Ryan Jardine (3) - 0:43; John Osborne (2) - pp - 16:52		Third period	6:38 - pp - Brandon Merli (3); 11:24 - sh - Brandon Merli (4); 16:01 - Ryan Held (3)
Ray Emery (2 – 1, 32 saves / 37 shots)		Goalie stats	Reg Bourcier (1 – 2, 52 saves / 54 shots)

April 4	Kitchener Rangers	4 – 5	Sault Ste. Marie Greyhounds	Sault Memorial Gardens	Recap
John Eminger (1) - 9:54		First period	No scoring
Derek Roy (4) - 0:22; Bobby Naylor (1) - 1:37; Ryan Held (4) - 8:39		Second period	2:53 - Ryan Healy (2); 3:41 - Josef Vasicek (3); 4:20 - Chad Spurr (5); 10:48 - Cleon Smith (1)
No scoring		Third period	9:17 - pp - Cory Pecker (3)
Reg Bourcier (1 – 3, 26 saves / 31 shots)		Goalie stats	Jason Flick (7 saves / 9 shots); Ray Emery (3 – 1, 16 saves / 18 shots)

Sault Ste. Marie wins series 4 – 1

===== (4) Sarnia Sting vs. (5) Windsor Spitfires =====
March 26	Windsor Spitfires	1 – 6	Sarnia Sting	Sarnia Sports & Entertainment Centre	Recap
Robin Boucher (1) - 0:44		First period	11:01 - sh - Maxim Rybin (1); 12:50 - Jason Penner (1)
No scoring		Second period	7:55 - Jeff Heerema (1); 19:37 - Jeff Heerema (2)
No scoring		Third period	10:24 - Maxim Rybin (2); 12:31 - Alexander Buturlin (1)
Ryan Aschaber (0 – 1, 18 saves / 22 shots); Michael Leighton (21 saves / 23 shots)		Goalie stats	Greg Hewitt (1 – 0, 30 saves / 31 shots)

March 28	Sarnia Sting	3 – 4	Windsor Spitfires	Windsor Arena	Recap
Ryan VanBuskirk (1) - pp - 7:28		First period	2:46 - pp - Steve Ott (1); 15:31 - pp - Robin Boucher (2); 18:42 - pp - Vince Grant (1)
No scoring		Second period	1:20 - Robin Boucher (3)
Jeff Heerema (3) - pp - 7:21; Robb Palahnuk (1) - pp - 7:40		Third period	No scoring
Greg Hewitt (1 – 1, 34 saves / 38 shots)		Goalie stats	Michael Leighton (1 – 0, 28 saves / 31 shots)

March 30	Windsor Spitfires	2 – 1	OT	Sarnia Sting	Sarnia Sports & Entertainment Centre	Recap
Craig Kennedy (1) - 6:54		First period		10:01 - Dusty Jamieson (1)
No scoring		Second period		No scoring
No scoring		Third period		No scoring
Shawn Mather (1) - 14:52		First overtime period		No scoring
Michael Leighton (2 – 0, 58 saves / 59 shots)		Goalie stats		Greg Hewitt (1 – 2, 24 saves / 26 shots)

March 31	Sarnia Sting	2 – 5	Windsor Spitfires	Windsor Arena	Recap
No scoring		First period	4:44 - Steve Ott (2)
Alexander Buturlin (1) - pp - 18:56		Second period	2:03 - Vince Grant (2); 6:38 - Mark Ridout (1); 14:26 - Mark Ridout (2); 14:59 - Mark Ridout (3)
Maxim Rybin (3) - 14:11		Third period	No scoring
Greg Hewitt (1 – 3, 19 saves / 24 shots); Andrew Sim (8 saves / 8 shots)		Goalie stats	Michael Leighton (3 – 0, 23 saves / 25 shots)

April 2	Windsor Spitfires	1 – 2	Sarnia Sting	Sarnia Sports & Entertainment Centre	Recap
Blair Stayzer (1) - pp - 13:24		First period	11:23 - pp - Dusty Jamieson (2)
No scoring		Second period	11:47 - Dusty Jamieson (3)
No scoring		Third period	No scoring
Michael Leighton (3 – 1, 41 saves / 43 shots)		Goalie stats	Greg Hewitt (2 – 3, 27 saves / 28 shots)

April 4	Sarnia Sting	5 – 3	Windsor Spitfires	Windsor Arena	Recap
Andy Burnham (1) - 19:07		First period	No scoring
Alexander Buturlin (3) - pp - 7:15		Second period	4:49 - Vince Grant (3)
Alexander Buturlin (4) - 5:57; Chris Berti (1) - 15:59; Maxim Rybin (4) - en - 18:39		Third period	0:36 - Tim Gleason (1)
Greg Hewitt (3 – 3, 30 saves / 33 shots)		Goalie stats	Michael Leighton (3 – 2, 36 saves / 40 shots)

April 6	Windsor Spitfires	4 – 3	OT	Sarnia Sting	Sarnia Sports & Entertainment Centre	Recap
No scoring		First period		No scoring
Robin Boucher (4) - 7:49; Shawn Mather (2) - 10:28		Second period		7:14 - Eric Himelfarb (1); 12:28 - Jeff Heerema (4)
Mark Ridout (4) - 10:21		Third period		3:53 - pp - Robb Palahnuk (2)
Jeff Martin (1) - 5:15		First overtime period		No scoring
Michael Leighton (4 – 2, 39 saves / 42 shots)		Goalie stats		Greg Hewitt (3 – 4, 35 saves / 39 shots)

Windsor wins series 4 – 3

=== Conference semifinals ===
==== Eastern conference semifinals ====
===== (1) Barrie Colts vs. (4) Sudbury Wolves =====
April 8	Sudbury Wolves	1 – 3	Barrie Colts	Barrie Molson Centre	Recap
No scoring		First period	14:57 - Sheldon Keefe (1)
Kip Brennan (1) - pp - 12:09		Second period	3:15 - Nick Robinson (1); 17:20 - pp - Sheldon Keefe (2)
No scoring		Third period	No scoring
Mike Gorman (4 – 2, 34 saves / 37 shots)		Goalie stats	Brian Finley (3 – 1, 35 saves / 36 shots)

April 10	Barrie Colts	0 – 3	Sudbury Wolves	Sudbury Community Arena	Recap
No scoring		First period	14:10 - pp - Taylor Pyatt (7); 18:14 - sh - Derek MacKenzie (3)
No scoring		Second period	No scoring
No scoring		Third period	12:37 - pp - Kip Brennan (2)
Brian Finley (3 – 2, 33 saves / 36 shots)		Goalie stats	Mike Gorman (5 – 2, 22 saves / 22 shots)

April 12	Sudbury Wolves	1 – 4	Barrie Colts	Barrie Molson Centre	Recap
Norm Milley (7) - pp - 16:47		First period	4:15 - Michael Henrich (5); 11:18 - pp - Blaine Down (2)
No scoring		Second period	4:44 - Michael Henrich (6)
No scoring		Third period	19:19 - en - Ed Hill (1)
Mike Gorman (5 – 3, 23 saves / 26 shots)		Goalie stats	Brian Finley (4 – 2, 33 saves / 34 shots)

April 14	Barrie Colts	4 – 5	Sudbury Wolves	Sudbury Community Arena	Recap
Blaine Down (3) - pp - 17:52		First period	No scoring
Mike Henderson (3) - sh - 6:26; Sheldon Keefe (3) - 10:15		Second period	18:34 - Jason Jaspers (3)
Blaine Down (4) - pp - 19:01		Third period	7:54 - pp - Brad Morgan (1); 11:10 - Derek MacKenzie (4); 12:40 - Kyle Dafoe (1); 16:48 - Sebastien Savage (1)
Brian Finley (4 – 3, 32 saves / 37 shots)		Goalie stats	Mike Gorman (6 – 3, 34 saves / 38 shots)

April 17	Sudbury Wolves	3 – 4	Barrie Colts	Barrie Molson Centre	Recap
Jason Jaspers (4) - pp - 12:15		First period	No scoring
Brad Morgan (2) - pp - 9:23; Steven Ellis (1) - pp - 16:23		Second period	1:48 - Tim Branham (2); 5:05 - Tim Branham (3); 14:04 - pp - Blaine Down (5)
No scoring		Third period	11:40 - Sheldon Keefe (4)
Mike Gorman (6 – 4, 34 saves / 38 shots)		Goalie stats	Brian Finley (5 – 3, 39 saves / 42 shots)

April 19	Barrie Colts	1 – 4	Sudbury Wolves	Sudbury Community Arena	Recap
Michael Henrich (7) - 6:03		First period	6:22 - Sebastien Savage (2); 15:42 - Derek MacKenzie (5)
No scoring		Second period	13:33 - Taylor Pyatt (8)
No scoring		Third period	8:29 - pp - Norm Milley (8)
Brian Finley (5 – 4, 33 saves / 37 shots); Mike D'Alessandro (1 save / 1 shot)		Goalie stats	Mike Gorman (7 – 4, 34 saves / 35 shots)

April 20	Sudbury Wolves	1 – 2	Barrie Colts	Barrie Molson Centre	Recap
Kip Brennan (3) - 16:16		First period	16:34 - Blaine Down (6)
No scoring		Second period	No scoring
No scoring		Third period	18:35 - pp - Ryan Barnes (1)
Mike Gorman (7 – 5, 34 saves / 36 shots)		Goalie stats	Brian Finley (6 – 4, 30 saves / 31 shots)

Barrie wins series 4 – 3

===== (2) Ottawa 67's vs. (3) Belleville Bulls =====
April 9	Belleville Bulls	2 – 3	Ottawa 67's	Ottawa Civic Centre	Recap
No scoring		First period	3:49 - pp - Miguel Delisle (3)
No scoring		Second period	10:16 - Miguel Delisle (4)
Michael Jacobsen (1) - 6:44; Mark Chaplin (4) - 8:24		Third period	3:16 - pp - Luke Sellars (2)
Cory Campbell (3 – 1, 20 saves / 23 shots)		Goalie stats	Levente Szuper (5 – 1, 43 saves / 45 shots)

April 11	Ottawa 67's	1 – 4	Belleville Bulls	Yardmen Arena	Recap
No scoring		First period	1:59 - pp - Branko Radivojevic (2)
Randy Davidson (1) - sh - 1:07		Second period	5:20 - Nathan Robinson (1); 15:46 - Kevin Baker (4)
No scoring		Third period	2:33 - Randy Rowe (4)
Levente Szuper (5 – 2, 27 saves / 31 shots)		Goalie stats	Corey Batten (2 – 1, 25 saves / 26 shots)

April 14	Belleville Bulls	2 – 3	Ottawa 67's	Ottawa Civic Centre	Recap
Kevin Baker (5) - pp - 3:38; Nathan Robinson (2) - 9:23		First period	11:49 - pp - Dan Tessier (1); 17:38 - pp - Luke Sellars (3)
No scoring		Second period	1:04 - pp - Kevin Holdridge (1)
No scoring		Third period	No scoring
Corey Batten (2 – 2, 16 saves / 19 shots); Cory Campbell (8 saves / 8 shots)		Goalie stats	Levente Szuper (6 – 2, 26 saves / 28 shots)

April 15	Ottawa 67's	3 – 5	Belleville Bulls	Yardmen Arena	Recap
Lance Galbraith (3) - 5:48		First period	4:05 - Nick Policelli (1); 10:27 - Adam Paiement (1)
No scoring		Second period	10:07 - Mark Chaplin (5); 14:40 - Jonathan Cheechoo (3)
Joe Talbot (3) - 19:09; Adam Chapman (2) - pp - 19:57		Third period	8:35 - pp - Jonathan Cheechoo (4)
Levente Szuper (6 – 3, 32 saves / 37 shots); Paul Schonfelder (8 saves / 8 shots)		Goalie stats	Cory Campbell (4 – 1, 25 saves / 28 shots)

April 17	Belleville Bulls	5 – 3	Ottawa 67's	Ottawa Civic Centre	Recap
Malcolm Hutt (1) - 3:34; Randy Rowe (5) - 10:07		First period	0:50 - pp - Luke Sellars (4); 18:37 - pp - Jonathan Zion (3)
Kevin Baker (6) - 10:44; Branko Radivojevic (3) - 18:46		Second period	No scoring
Mark Chaplin (6) - en - 19:56		Third period	2:48 - Matt Zultek (3)
Cory Campbell (4 – 2, 40 saves / 43 shots)		Goalie stats	Levente Szuper (6 – 4, 30 saves / 34 shots)

April 19	Ottawa 67's	3 – 6	Belleville Bulls	Yardmen Arena	Recap
No scoring		First period	11:14 - pp - Kevin Baker (7)
Lance Galbraith (4) - 10:19; Randy Davidson (2) - 11:40		Second period	9:33 - Malcolm Hutt (2); 17:33 - Chris Stanley (2)
Dan Tessier (2) - pp - 15:57		Third period	0:45 - Justin Papineau (4); 3:24 - Randy Rowe (6); 19:40 - Kevin Baker (8)
Levente Szuper (6 – 5, 34 saves / 40 shots)		Goalie stats	Cory Campbell (5 – 2, 32 saves / 35 shots)

Belleville wins series 4 – 2

==== Western conference semifinals ====
===== (1) Plymouth Whalers vs. (5) Windsor Spitfires =====
April 8	Windsor Spitfires	0 – 6	Plymouth Whalers	Compuware Sports Arena	Recap
No scoring		First period	5:12 - pp - Shaun Fisher (3); 8:50 - Tomas Kurka (1); 13:40 - Damian Surma (2); 16:39 - Steven Morris (2)
No scoring		Second period	14:18 - pp - George Nistas (1)
No scoring		Third period	13:41 - Cole Jarrett (1)
Michael Leighton (4 – 3, 14 saves / 18 shots); Ryan Aschaber (22 saves / 24 shots)		Goalie stats	Rob Zepp (5 – 2, 25 saves / 25 shots)

April 10	Plymouth Whalers	1 – 2	Windsor Spitfires	Windsor Arena	Recap
No scoring		First period	No scoring
Kristopher Vernarsky (2) - sh - 15:49		Second period	3:49 - Curtis Watson (1); 4:53 - Vince Grant (4)
No scoring		Third period	No scoring
Rob Zepp (5 – 3, 18 saves / 20 shots)		Goalie stats	Michael Leighton (5 – 3, 27 saves / 28 shots)

April 12	Windsor Spitfires	1 – 2	Plymouth Whalers	Compuware Sports Arena	Recap
No scoring		First period	6:04 - Nate Kiser (1)
No scoring		Second period	2:14 - Damian Surma (3)
Robert Boucher (5) - pp - 2:53		Third period	No scoring
Michael Leighton (5 – 4, 39 saves / 41 shots)		Goalie stats	Rob Zepp (6 – 3, 23 saves / 24 shots)

April 14	Plymouth Whalers	8 – 3	Windsor Spitfires	Windsor Arena	Recap
Randy Fitzgerald (5) - 3:02; Andre Robichaud (1) - 11:23; Damian Surma (4) - pp - 12:14; Eric Gooldy (2) - 17:41; Tomas Kurka (2) - 19:27		First period	8:23 - pp - Patrick Finnegan (1); 14:07 - pp - Tim Gleason (2)
Randy Fitzgerald (6) - 13:05		Second period	No scoring
George Nistas (2) - 11:02; Randy Fitzgerald (7) - 15:34		Third period	5:43 - pp - Steve Ott (3)
Rob Zepp (7 – 3, 29 saves / 32 shots)		Goalie stats	Michael Leighton (5 – 5, 13 saves / 18 shots); Ryan Aschaber (14 saves / 17 shots)

April 15	Windsor Spitfires	1 – 4	Plymouth Whalers	Compuware Sports Arena	Recap
Vince Grant (5) - pp - 14:21		First period	6:01 - Damian Surma (5); 10:42 - Justin Williams (9)
No scoring		Second period	2:53 - pp - Randy Fitzgerald (8)
No scoring		Third period	18:46 - en - Tomas Kurka (3)
Michael Leighton (5 – 6, 38 saves / 41 shots)		Goalie stats	Rob Zepp (8 – 3, 21 saves / 22 shots)

Plymouth wins series 4 – 1

===== (2) Erie Otters vs. (3) Sault Ste. Marie Greyhounds =====
April 10	Sault Ste. Marie Greyhounds	3 – 4	OT	Erie Otters	Erie Civic Center	Recap
Ryan Jardine (4) - pp - 8:04		First period		8:39 - pp - Brad Boyes (6)
Ryan Jardine (5) - sh - 10:33; John Osborne (3) - 17:51		Second period		11:11 - pp - Michael Rupp (3)
No scoring		Third period		7:01 - pp - Arvid Rekis (1)
No scoring		First overtime period		19:47 - Brad Yeo (2)
Ray Emery (3 – 2, 39 saves / 43 shots)		Goalie stats		J.F. Serras (5 – 2, 43 saves / 46 shots)

April 11	Sault Ste. Marie Greyhounds	4 – 5	OT	Erie Otters	Erie Civic Center	Recap
Ryan Jardine (6) - 0:43; Chad Spurr (6) - pp - 6:10		First period		7:18 - Scott Rozendal (1); 11:27 - pp - Nikita Alexeev (3)
Daniel Passero (2) - pp - 1:23		Second period		3:43 - pp - Shane Nash (2); 6:15 - pp - Jason Baird (5)
Cory Pecker (4) - pp - 7:33		Third period		No scoring
No scoring		First overtime period		7:09 - Troy Ilijow (1) - 7:09
Jeremy Day (23 saves / 27 shots); Ray Emery (3 – 3, 20 saves / 21 shots)		Goalie stats		J.F. Serras (6 – 2, 45 saves / 49 shots)

April 13	Erie Otters	1 – 3	Sault Ste. Marie Greyhounds	Sault Memorial Gardens	Recap
No scoring		First period	No scoring
No scoring		Second period	18:05 - Trevor Daley (1)
Nikita Alexeev (4) - 4:37		Third period	13:13 - John Osborne (4); 19:34 - en - Josef Vasicek (4)
J.F. Serras (6 – 3, 27 saves / 29 shots)		Goalie stats	Ray Emery (4 – 3, 26 saves / 27 shots)

April 14	Erie Otters	0 – 2	Sault Ste. Marie Greyhounds	Sault Memorial Gardens	Recap
No scoring		First period	No scoring
No scoring		Second period	2:24 - John Osborne (5)
No scoring		Third period	1:28 - pp - Ryan Jardine (7)
J.F. Serras (6 – 4, 29 saves / 31 shots)		Goalie stats	Ray Emery (5 – 3, 31 saves / 31 shots)

April 16	Sault Ste. Marie Greyhounds	1 – 3	Erie Otters	Erie Civic Center	Recap
No scoring		First period	No scoring
No scoring		Second period	4:53 - pp - Jason Baird (6); 11:10 - Jason Baird (7)
Ryan Healy (3) - pp - 9:59		Third period	2:34 - Peter Campbell (1)
Ray Emery (5 – 4, 23 saves / 26 shots)		Goalie stats	J.F. Serras (7 – 4, 34 saves / 35 shots)

April 18	Erie Otters	4 – 8	Sault Ste. Marie Greyhounds	Sault Memorial Gardens	Recap
No scoring		First period	7:13 - pp - Ryan Jardine (8); 9:10 - pp - Cleon Smith (2)
Michael Rupp (4) - 12:26; Carlo Colaiacovo (2) - pp - 16:50		Second period	14:26 - Ryan Jardine (9); 19:50 - Josef Vasicek (5)
Michael Rupp (5) - pp - 3:47; Mike Nelson (3) - pp - 13:15		Third period	6:07 - pp - Ryan Jardine (10); 11:10 - Ryan Milanovic (1); 14:15 - pp - Daniel Passero (3); 18:45 - pp - Josh Bennett (1)
J.F. Serras (7 – 5, 42 saves / 49 shots); Adam Munro (6 saves / 7 shots)		Goalie stats	Ray Emery (6 – 4, 40 saves / 44 shots)

April 20	Sault Ste. Marie Greyhounds	4 – 0	Erie Otters	Erie Civic Center	Recap
Ryan Jardine (11) - 7:16		First period	No scoring
Ryan Milanovic (2) - 4:23		Second period	No scoring
Ryan Milanovic (3) - 0:35; Cory Pecker (5) - en - 18:39		Third period	No scoring
Ray Emery (7 – 4, 40 saves / 40 shots)		Goalie stats	J.F. Serras (7 – 6, 26 saves / 29 shots)

Sault Ste. Marie wins series 4 – 3

=== Conference finals ===
==== Eastern conference finals ====
===== (1) Barrie Colts vs. (3) Belleville Bulls =====
April 22	Belleville Bulls	2 – 5	Barrie Colts	Barrie Molson Centre	Recap
No scoring		First period	4:28 - Sheldon Keefe (5)
Branko Radivojevic (4) - pp - 6:50; Randy Rowe (7) - sh - 17:58		Second period	1:51 - Mike Christian (1); 11:26 - pp - Ryan Barnes (2)
No scoring		Third period	14:56 - Sheldon Keefe (6); 15:50 - Mike Christian (2)
Cory Campbell (5 – 3, 35 saves / 40 shots)		Goalie stats	Brian Finley (7 – 4, 36 saves / 38 shots)

April 24	Barrie Colts	6 – 2	Belleville Bulls	Yardmen Arena	Recap
Blaine Down (7) - 2:22; Michael Henrich (8) - 8:16		First period	No scoring
Mike Christian (3) - 15:52		Second period	0:59 - pp - Jonathan Cheechoo (5)
Ryan Barnes (3) - 3:25; Shawn Cation (2) - pp - 15:54; Tim Verbeek (1) - 17:05		Third period	17:33 - Kevin Baker (9)
Brian Finley (8 – 4, 29 saves / 31 shots)		Goalie stats	Cory Campbell (5 – 4, 19 saves / 23 shots); Corey Batten (9 saves / 11 shots)

April 26	Belleville Bulls	6 – 5	OT	Barrie Colts	Barrie Molson Centre	Recap
Kevin Baker (10) - pp - 10:52		First period		7:36 - Matthew Dzieduszycki (3)
Michael Jacobsen (2) - 3:03; Chris Stanley (3) - pp - 6:59; Mike Renzi (4) - 9:41		Second period		2:29 - Blaine Down (8); 12:15 - pp Shawn Cation (3); 17:24 - Mike Jefferson (1)
Kevin Baker (11) - pp - 16:00		Third period		1:38 - Mike Jefferson (2)
Chris Stanley (4) - 3:49		First overtime period		No scoring
Corey Batten (24 saves / 29 shots); Cory Campbell (6 – 4, 9 saves / 9 shots)		Goalie stats		Brian Finley (8 – 5, 37 saves / 43 shots)

April 28	Barrie Colts	3 – 2	Belleville Bulls	Yardmen Arena	Recap
Shawn Cation (4) - pp - 11:40; Mike Jefferson (3) - pp - 19:12		First period	6:03 - pp - Nathan Robinson (3)
Shawn Cation (5) - 5:01		Second period	7:28 - Kyle Wellwood (3)
No scoring		Third period	No scoring
Brian Finley (9 – 5, 37 saves / 39 shots)		Goalie stats	Cory Campbell (6 – 5, 28 saves / 31 shots)

April 30	Belleville Bulls	1 – 7	Barrie Colts	Barrie Molson Centre	Recap
No scoring		First period	5:05 - Mike Christian (4); 13:01 - Sheldon Keefe (7)
Branco Radivojevic (5) - 5:16		Second period	1:47 - pp - Sheldon Keefe (8); 13:34 - Ryan Barnes (4); 16:35 - Matthew Dzieduszycki (4)
No scoring		Third period	15:07 - Ryan Barnes (5); 17:49 - pp - Shawn Cation (6)
Cory Campbell (6 – 6, 17 saves / 22 shots); Corey Batten (7 saves / 9 shots)		Goalie stats	Brian Finley (10 – 5, 30 saves / 31 shots)

Barrie wins series 4 – 1

==== Western conference finals ====
===== (1) Plymouth Whalers vs. (3) Sault Ste. Marie Greyhounds =====
April 22	Sault Ste. Marie Greyhounds	1 – 4	Plymouth Whalers	Compuware Sports Arena	Recap
Chad Spurr (7) - 13:58		First period	19:37 - Justin Williams (10)
No scoring		Second period	8:44 - George Nistas (3); 9:40 - pp - Tomas Kurka (4); 16:44 - pp - Damian Surma (6)
No scoring		Third period	No scoring
Jason Flick (1 – 1, 27 saves / 31 shots)		Goalie stats	Rob Zepp (9 – 3, 22 saves / 23 shots)

April 25	Plymouth Whalers	0 – 2	Sault Ste. Marie Greyhounds	Sault Memorial Gardens	Recap
No scoring		First period	No scoring
No scoring		Second period	6:02 - Ryan Milanovic (4); 14:37 - Jeff Richards (1)
No scoring		Third period	No scoring
Rob Zepp (9 – 4, 24 saves / 26 shots)		Goalie stats	Ray Emery (8 – 4, 40 saves / 40 shots)

April 26	Plymouth Whalers	4 – 3	Sault Ste. Marie Greyhounds	Sault Memorial Gardens	Recap
No scoring		First period	9:11 - Rob Chapman (2)
Stephen Weiss (7) - 8:36; Shaun Fisher (4) - pp - 12:43; Justin Williams (11) - 19:50		Second period	No scoring
Cole Jarrett (2) - pp - 17:14		Third period	4:06 - Trevor Daley (2); 16:04 - pp - John Osborne (6)
Rob Zepp (10 – 4, 31 saves / 34 shots)		Goalie stats	Ray Emery (8 – 5, 33 saves / 37 shots)

April 28	Sault Ste. Marie Greyhounds	1 – 2	OT	Plymouth Whalers	Compuware Sports Arena	Recap
No scoring		First period		No scoring
Trevor Daley (3) - 19:11		Second period		15:19 - pp - Cole Jarrett (3)
No scoring		Third period		No scoring
No scoring		First overtime period		13:20 - sh - Justin Williams (12)
Ray Emery (8 – 6, 23 saves / 25 shots)		Goalie stats		Rob Zepp (11 – 4, 33 saves / 34 shots)

April 29	Sault Ste. Marie Greyhounds	1 – 3	Plymouth Whalers	Compuware Sports Arena	Recap
Cory Pecker (6) - 6:02		First period	No scoring
No scoring		Second period	3:38 - Eric Gooldy (3); 4:23 - Randy Fitzgerald (9)
No scoring		Third period	9:04 - Eric Gooldy (4)
Ray Emery (8 – 7, 32 saves / 35 shots)		Goalie stats	Rob Zepp (12 – 4, 32 saves / 33 shots)

Plymouth wins series 4 – 1

=== OHL finals ===
==== J. Ross Robertson cup finals ====
===== (W1) Plymouth Whalers vs. (E1) Barrie Colts =====
May 4	Plymouth Whalers	5 – 4	OT	Barrie Colts	Barrie Molson Centre	Recap
No scoring		First period		No scoring
Eric Gooldy (5) - 7:11; Jamie Lalonde (1) - 8:19; Randy Fitzgerald (10) - 13:06		Second period		9:41 - Blaine Down (9)
Eric Gooldy (6) - pp - 5:53		Third period		2:27 - Mike Jefferson (4); 7:27 - pp - Mike Jefferson (5); 13:20 - Mike Christian (5)
Randy Fitzgerald (11) - 0:59		First overtime period		No scoring
Rob Zepp (13 – 4, 33 saves / 37 shots)		Goalie stats		Brian Finley (10 – 6, 30 saves / 35 shots)

May 7	Barrie Colts	4 – 3	Plymouth Whalers	Compuware Sports Arena	Recap
Rick Hwodeky (1) - 11:45		First period	19:27 - pp - Eric Gooldy (7)
Denis Shvidki (2) - 2:12		Second period	No scoring
Tim Branham (4) - 5:09; Matthew Dzieduszycki (5) - 12:59		Third period	16:22 - George Nistas (4); 18:08 - Justin Williams (13)
Brian Finley (11 – 6, 38 saves / 41 shots)		Goalie stats	Rob Zepp (13 – 5, 27 saves / 31 shots)

May 8	Barrie Colts	3 – 5	Plymouth Whalers	Compuware Sports Arena	Recap
Tim Verbeek (2) - 2:14; Tim Verbeek (3) - 18:19		First period	12:11 - sh - Stephen Weiss (8); 19:16 - Kristopher Vernarsky (3)
Mike Jefferson (6) - pp - 16:47		Second period	0:44 - pp - Justin Williams (14); 2:15 - Tomas Kurka (5)
No scoring		Third period	19:46 - en - Randy Fitzgerald (12)
Brian Finley (11 – 7, 27 saves / 31 shots)		Goalie stats	Rob Zepp (14 – 5, 30 saves / 33 shots)

May 10	Plymouth Whalers	3 – 6	Barrie Colts	Barrie Molson Centre	Recap
Tomas Kurka (6) - pp - 8:20		First period	3:55 - pp - Denis Shvidki (3); 5:25 - sh - Ryan Barnes (6)
No scoring		Second period	0:25 - pp - Ryan Barnes (7); 9:53 - Mike Henderson (4)
Damian Surma (7) - 7:57; Damian Surma (8) - pp - 12:02		Third period	12:42 - Mike Christian (6); 19:04 - en - Sheldon Keefe (9)
Rob Zepp (14 – 6, 23 saves / 27 shots); Bill Ruggiero (9 saves / 10 shots)		Goalie stats	Brian Finley (12 – 7, 30 saves / 33 shots)

May 12	Barrie Colts	1 – 3	Plymouth Whalers	Compuware Sports Arena	Recap
No scoring		First period	16:05 - George Nistas (5)
No scoring		Second period	No scoring
Blaine Down (10) - 11:04		Third period	11:35 - Randy Fitzgerald (13); 19:11 - en - Tomas Kurka (7)
Brian Finley (12 – 8, 26 saves / 28 shots)		Goalie stats	Rob Zepp (15 – 6, 28 saves / 29 shots)

May 14	Plymouth Whalers	0 – 3	Barrie Colts	Barrie Molson Centre	Recap
No scoring		First period	6:13 - Mike Jefferson (7)
No scoring		Second period	No scoring
No scoring		Third period	7:05 - Michael Henrich (9); 18:21 - Michael Henrich (10)
Rob Zepp (15 – 7, 32 saves / 35 shots)		Goalie stats	Brian Finley (13 – 8, 26 saves / 26 shots)

May 16	Barrie Colts	4 – 2	Plymouth Whalers	Compuware Sports Arena	Recap
Sheldon Keefe (10) - pp - 6:36		First period	10:16 - pp - Damiam Surma (9)
Mike Henderson (5) - 4:40		Second period	No scoring
Tim Verbeek (4) - 7:02; Tim Verbeek (5) - 18:29		Third period	10:32 - George Nistas (6)
Brian Finley (14 – 8, 27 saves / 29 shots)		Goalie stats	Rob Zepp (15 – 8, 24 saves / 28 shots)

Barrie wins series 4 – 3

=== J. Ross Robertson Cup Champions Roster ===
1999-00 Barrie Colts
Goaltenders: (Canada) 1 – Brian Finley; (United States) 30 – Dana Bannerman; (Canada) 30 – Mike D'Alessandro	Defencemen: (Canada) 2 – Ryan O'Keefe; (Canada) 4 – Nick Robinson; (United States) 5 – Erik Reitz; (Canada) 6 – Aaron Power; (United States) 7 – Ed Hill; (United States) 15 – Tim Branham; (United States) 18 – Rick Hwodeky; (Canada) 26 – Shawn Cation	Wingers: (Canada) 9 – Blaine Down; (Canada) 10 – Ryan Barnes; (Canada) 14 – Matt Passfield; (Canada) 20 – Kyle Wailes; (Canada) 23 – Mike Christian; (Canada) 27 – Michael Henrich; (Canada) 28 – Sheldon Keefe - C; (Canada) 32 – Mike Henderson; (Canada) 34 – Mike Jefferson; (Ukraine) 35 – Denis Shvidki	Centres: (Canada) 16 – Tim Verbeek; (Canada) 19 – Matthew Dzieduszycki; Coach: (Canada) Bill Stewart; General Manager: (Canada) Bill Stewart

=== Playoff scoring leaders ===
Note: GP = Games played; G = Goals; A = Assists; Pts = Points; PIM = Penalty minutes

Player	Team	GP	G	A	Pts	PIM
Justin Williams	Plymouth Whalers	23	14	16	30	10
Michael Henrich	Barrie Colts	25	10	18	28	30
Stephen Weiss	Plymouth Whalers	23	8	18	26	18
Shaun Fisher	Plymouth Whalers	23	4	21	25	24
Randy Fitzgerald	Plymouth Whalers	23	13	10	23	47
Sheldon Keefe	Barrie Colts	25	10	13	23	41
Mike Jefferson	Barrie Colts	25	7	16	23	107
Mike Christian	Barrie Colts	25	6	15	21	37
Randy Rowe	Belleville Bulls	16	7	13	20	6
Josef Vasicek	Sault Ste. Marie Greyhounds	17	5	15	20	8

=== Playoff leading goaltenders ===
Note: GP = Games played; Mins = Minutes played; W = Wins; L = Losses: OTL = Overtime losses; SL = Shootout losses; GA = Goals Allowed; SO = Shutouts; GAA = Goals against average

Player	Team	GP	Mins	W	L	GA	SO	Sv%	GAA
Alex Auld	North Bay Centennials	6	375	2	4	12	0	0.953	1.92
Derek Dolson	Oshawa Generals	4	257	0	3	9	0	0.930	2.10
Ray Emery	Sault Ste. Marie Greyhounds	15	884	8	7	33	3	0.931	2.24
Rob Zepp	Plymouth Whalers	23	1374	15	8	52	2	0.925	2.27
Mike Gorman	Sudbury Wolves	12	720	7	5	29	1	0.930	2.42

== All-Star teams ==
=== First team ===
- Dan Tessier, Centre, Ottawa 67's
- Taylor Pyatt, Left Wing, Sudbury Wolves
- Norm Milley, Right Wing, Sudbury Wolves
- John Erskine, Defence, London Knights
- Branislav Mezei, Defence, Belleville Bulls
- Andrew Raycroft, Goaltender, Kingston Frontenacs
- Peter DeBoer, Coach, Plymouth Whalers

=== Second team ===
- Jason Jaspers, Centre, Sudbury Wolves
- Raffi Torres, Left Wing, Brampton Battalion
- Sheldon Keefe, Right Wing, Barrie Colts
- Allan Rourke, Defence, Kitchener Rangers
- Kevin Mitchell, Defence, Guelph Storm
- Rob Zepp, Goaltender, Plymouth Whalers
- Tom Webster, Coach, Windsor Spitfires

=== Third team ===
- Josef Vasicek, Centre, Sault Ste. Marie Greyhounds
- Johnathan Schill, Left Wing, Kingston Frontenacs
- Denis Shvidki, Right Wing, Barrie Colts
- Alexei Semenov, Defence, Sudbury Wolves
- Mike Van Ryn, Defence, Sarnia Sting
- Levente Szuper, Goaltender, Ottawa 67's
- Stan Butler, Coach, Brampton Battalion

== Awards ==
J. Ross Robertson Cup:	Barrie Colts
Hamilton Spectator Trophy:	Plymouth Whalers
Bobby Orr Trophy:	Barrie Colts
Wayne Gretzky Trophy:	Plymouth Whalers
Leyden Trophy:	Ottawa 67's
Emms Trophy:	Barrie Colts
Holody Trophy:	Erie Otters
Bumbacco Trophy:	Plymouth Whalers
Red Tilson Trophy:	Andrew Raycroft, Kingston Frontenacs
Eddie Powers Memorial Trophy:	Sheldon Keefe, Barrie Colts
Matt Leyden Trophy:	Peter DeBoer, Plymouth Whalers
Jim Mahon Memorial Trophy:	Sheldon Keefe, Barrie Colts
Max Kaminsky Trophy:	John Erskine, London Knights
OHL Goaltender of the Year:	Andrew Raycroft, Kingston Frontenacs
Jack Ferguson Award:	Patrick Jarrett, Mississauga IceDogs
Dave Pinkney Trophy:	Rob Zepp and Bill Ruggiero, Plymouth Whalers
OHL Executive of the Year:	Robert Ciccarelli, Sarnia Sting
Emms Family Award:	Derek Roy, Kitchener Rangers
F.W. 'Dinty' Moore Trophy:	Andrew Sim, Sarnia Sting
OHL Humanitarian of the Year:	Dan Tessier, Ottawa 67's
William Hanley Trophy:	Mike Zigomanis, Kingston Frontenacs
Leo Lalonde Memorial Trophy:	Dan Tessier, Ottawa 67's
Bobby Smith Trophy:	Brad Boyes, Erie Otters
Wayne Gretzky 99 Award:	Brian Finley, Barrie Colts

== 2000 OHL Priority Selection ==
On June 3, 2000, the OHL conducted the 2000 Ontario Hockey League Priority Selection at the Hershey Centre in Mississauga, Ontario. The Mississauga IceDogs held the first overall pick in the draft, and selected Patrick Jarrett from the Soo Thunderbirds. Jarrett was awarded the Jack Ferguson Award, awarded to the top pick in the draft.

Below are the players who were selected in the first round of the 2000 Ontario Hockey League Priority Selection.

#	Player	Nationality	OHL Team	Hometown	Minor Team
1	Patrick Jarrett (C)	Canada	Mississauga IceDogs	Sault Ste. Marie, Ontario	Soo Thunderbirds
2	Tim Brent (C/RW)	Canada	Toronto St. Michael's Majors	Cambridge, Ontario	Cambridge Winter Hawks
3	Richard Power (D)	Canada	Owen Sound Attack	Welland, Ontario	Toronto Marlboros
4	Rick Nash (LW)	Canada	London Knights	Brampton, Ontario	Toronto Marlboros
5	Craig Foster (C)	Canada	North Bay Centennials	Carp, Ontario	Ottawa Valley Titans
6	Daniel Paille (LW)	Canada	Guelph Storm	Welland, Ontario	Welland Jr. Canadians
7	Adam Henrich (LW)	Canada	Brampton Battalion	Thornhill, Ontario	Don Mills Flyers
8	Andre Benoit (D)	Canada	Kitchener Rangers	Barrie, Ontario	Penetang Kings
9	Ben Eager (LW)	Canada	Oshawa Generals	Ottawa, Ontario	Ottawa Jr. Senators
10	Brian Lee (D)	United States	Erie Otters	Berrien Springs, Michigan	Detroit Honeybaked
11	Matt Maccarone (LW)	Canada	Windsor Spitfires	Whitby, Ontario	Whitby Wildcats
12	John Hecimovic (RW)	Canada	Sarnia Sting	Waterloo, Ontario	Kitchener Jr. Rangers
13	Eric Staal (C)	Canada	Peterborough Petes	Thunder Bay, Ontario	Thunder Bay Kings
14	Justin McCutcheon (RW)	United States	Kingston Frontenacs	Ithaca, New York	Brampton Capitals
15	Adam Sturgeon (D)	Canada	Sudbury Wolves	Erin, Ontario	Milton IceHawks
16	Jeremy Swanson (D)	Canada	Sault Ste. Marie Greyhounds	Thunder Bay, Ontario	Thunder Bay Kings
17	Andre Deveaux (RW)	Canada	Belleville Bulls	Welland, Ontario	Fort Erie Meteors
18	Bryan Rodney (D)	Canada	Ottawa 67's	London, Ontario	St. Mary's Lincolns
19	Dean Byvelds (LW)	Canada	Barrie Colts	Chesterville, Ontario	Wellington Dukes
20	James Wisniewski (D)	United States	Plymouth Whalers	Canton, Michigan	Plymouth Compuware

== See also ==
- List of OHA Junior A standings
- List of OHL seasons
- 2000 Memorial Cup
- 2000 NHL entry draft
- 1999 in sports
- 2000 in sports

Preceded by 1998–99 OHL season	OHL seasons	Succeeded by 2000–01 OHL season
