= Norm Milley =

Canadian ice hockey player

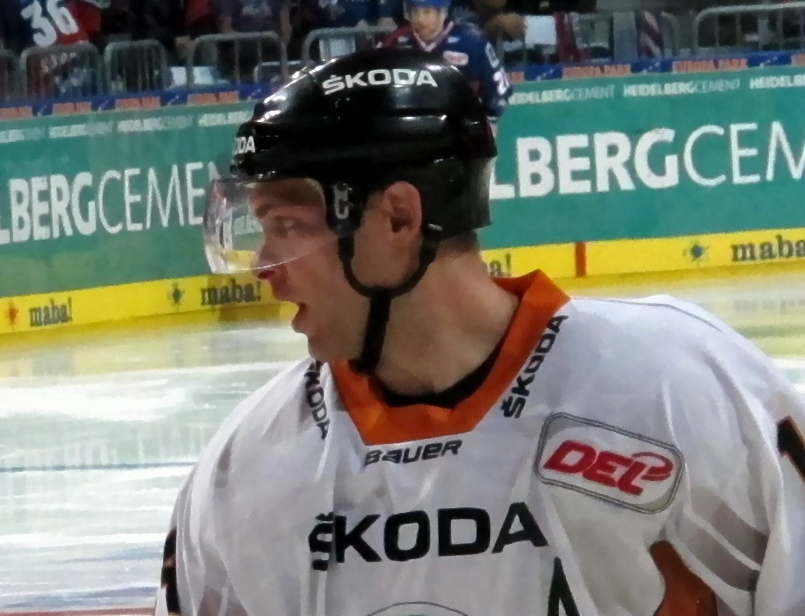
- Born: February 14, 1980 (age 46) Toronto, Ontario, Canada
- Height: 6 ft 0 in (183 cm)
- Weight: 211 lb (96 kg; 15 st 1 lb)
- Position: Right wing
- Shot: Right
- Played for: Buffalo Sabres; Tampa Bay Lightning; Grizzly Adams Wolfsburg; Düsseldorfer EG
- NHL draft: 47th overall, 1998; Buffalo Sabres
- Playing career: 2000–2017

Norman Milley (born February 14, 1980) is a Canadian former professional ice hockey right winger who played in the National Hockey League with the Buffalo Sabres and Tampa Bay Lightning before moving to the Deutsche Eishockey Liga to play out his career.

== Playing career ==
As a youth, Milley played in the 1994 Quebec International Pee-Wee Hockey Tournament with the Toronto Red Wings minor ice hockey team.

Milley was drafted by the Buffalo Sabres in the 2nd round, 47th overall, in the 1998 NHL entry draft. After finishing his prolific junior career with the Sudbury Wolves of the Ontario Hockey League, Milley was signed to an entry-level contract by the Sabres. Over 5 seasons with the Sabres, Milley played in just 15 games, primarily playing with Buffalo's American Hockey League affiliate, the Rochester Americans.

In the 2003–04 playoffs with the Americans, Milley scored a memorable series clinching goal on May 1, 2004. With Rochester trailing 3-1 to the Syracuse Crunch in the first round of the AHL playoffs, Rochester won the next two games to tie the series at 3-3. In game seven, Milley clinched the comeback for the Americans in the first overtime.

On August 18, 2005, Milley signed with the Tampa Bay Lightning. In the 2005–06 season, Milley scored his first NHL goal and in 14 games with the Lightning recorded 3 points. For the majority of his contract with Tampa, Milley was again assigned to the AHL with the Springfield Falcons and later the Norfolk Admirals.

Milley left for Europe for the 2008–09 season, signing a one-year contract with Grizzly Adams Wolfsburg of the Deutsche Eishockey Liga. With Milley scoring among the leaders on Wolfsburg he was quickly signed to a two-year extension on December 18, 2008.

After seven prolific seasons with Wolfsburg, three as co-captain, Milley left the club as a free agent to sign a two-year contract with Düsseldorfer EG on April 7, 2015. At the conclusion of his second year with Düsseldorfer in the 2016–17 season, having contributed with just 10 points in 41 games, Milley opted to end his professional career after 17 seasons.

== Coaching career ==
Milley joined the coaching staff of the Ottawa 67's of the Ontario Hockey League in 2017, where he continues as an assistant coach.

== Personal life ==
He is married to Katie Hindle Milley and they have a son, Noah, who was born April 11, 2007, and a daughter.

== Career statistics ==
| | | | Regular season | | | | | Playoffs |
| Season | Team | League | GP | G | A | Pts | PIM | GP | G | A | Pts | PIM |
|---|---|---|---|---|---|---|---|---|---|---|---|---|
| 1996–97 | Sudbury Wolves | OHL | 61 | 30 | 32 | 62 | 15 | — | — | — | — | — |
| 1997–98 | Sudbury Wolves | OHL | 62 | 33 | 41 | 74 | 48 | 10 | 0 | 1 | 1 | 4 |
| 1998–99 | Sudbury Wolves | OHL | 68 | 52 | 68 | 120 | 47 | 4 | 2 | 3 | 5 | 4 |
| 1999–00 | Sudbury Wolves | OHL | 68 | 52 | 60 | 112 | 47 | 12 | 8 | 11 | 19 | 6 |
| 2000–01 | Rochester Americans | AHL | 77 | 20 | 27 | 47 | 56 | 4 | 0 | 0 | 0 | 2 |
| 2001–02 | Rochester Americans | AHL | 74 | 20 | 18 | 38 | 20 | 2 | 0 | 3 | 3 | 6 |
| 2001–02 | Buffalo Sabres | NHL | 5 | 0 | 1 | 1 | 0 | — | — | — | — | — |
| 2002–03 | Rochester Americans | AHL | 67 | 16 | 32 | 48 | 39 | 3 | 2 | 0 | 2 | 2 |
| 2002–03 | Buffalo Sabres | NHL | 8 | 0 | 2 | 2 | 6 | — | — | — | — | — |
| 2003–04 | Rochester Americans | AHL | 77 | 18 | 19 | 37 | 60 | 16 | 7 | 6 | 13 | 10 |
| 2003–04 | Buffalo Sabres | NHL | 2 | 0 | 0 | 0 | 2 | — | — | — | — | — |
| 2004–05 | Rochester Americans | AHL | 72 | 12 | 21 | 33 | 46 | 9 | 1 | 2 | 3 | 4 |
| 2005–06 | Springfield Falcons | AHL | 53 | 19 | 29 | 48 | 34 | — | — | — | — | — |
| 2005–06 | Tampa Bay Lightning | NHL | 14 | 2 | 1 | 3 | 4 | — | — | — | — | — |
| 2006–07 | Springfield Falcons | AHL | 73 | 26 | 34 | 60 | 46 | — | — | — | — | — |
| 2007–08 | Norfolk Admirals | AHL | 56 | 18 | 28 | 46 | 30 | — | — | — | — | — |
| 2008–09 | Grizzly Adams Wolfsburg | DEL | 52 | 10 | 39 | 49 | 26 | 10 | 1 | 3 | 4 | 2 |
| 2009–10 | Grizzly Adams Wolfsburg | DEL | 54 | 20 | 32 | 52 | 53 | 7 | 2 | 6 | 8 | 6 |
| 2010–11 | Grizzly Adams Wolfsburg | DEL | 51 | 13 | 35 | 48 | 28 | 9 | 4 | 7 | 11 | 2 |
| 2011–12 | Grizzly Adams Wolfsburg | DEL | 52 | 14 | 44 | 58 | 33 | 4 | 2 | 2 | 4 | 2 |
| 2012–13 | Grizzly Adams Wolfsburg | DEL | 52 | 9 | 35 | 44 | 51 | 12 | 4 | 7 | 11 | 2 |
| 2013–14 | Grizzly Adams Wolfsburg | DEL | 45 | 9 | 25 | 34 | 18 | 11 | 4 | 7 | 11 | 4 |
| 2014–15 | Grizzly Adams Wolfsburg | DEL | 39 | 9 | 23 | 32 | 14 | 4 | 2 | 2 | 4 | 2 |
| 2015–16 | Düsseldorfer EG | DEL | 51 | 10 | 35 | 45 | 41 | 5 | 1 | 1 | 2 | 2 |
| 2016–17 | Düsseldorfer EG | DEL | 41 | 4 | 6 | 10 | 6 | — | — | — | — | — |
| NHL totals | | | 29 | 2 | 4 | 6 | 12 | — | — | — | — | — |
