= Damian Surma =

American ice hockey player (born 1981)

- Born: January 22, 1981 (age 45) Lincoln Park, Michigan, U.S.
- Height: 5 ft 9 in (175 cm)
- Weight: 200 lb (91 kg; 14 st 4 lb)
- Position: Left wing
- Shot: Left
- Played for: Carolina Hurricanes; HC Valpellice Bulldogs
- National team: United States
- NHL draft: 174th overall, 1999; Carolina Hurricanes
- Playing career: 2002–2014

Damian M. Surma (born January 22, 1981) is an American retired professional ice hockey left winger.

== Biography ==
Surma was born in Lincoln Park, Michigan. As a youth, he played in the 1995 Quebec International Pee-Wee Hockey Tournament with the Detroit Little Caesars minor ice hockey team.

He played junior ice hockey for the Plymouth Whalers of the Ontario Hockey League. His best season came in the 1999-00 season when he recorded 78 points in 66 games with the Plymouth Whalers. He scored 34 goals and recorded 44 assists that season while spending 114 minutes in the penalty box.

He was drafted 174th overall by the Carolina Hurricanes in the 1999 NHL entry draft and played two games for the Hurricanes. He scored a goal in his first game and registered an assist in the second.

From 2006 to 2007, he played in Serie A league for HC Valpellice Bulldogs and Associazione Sportiva Asiago Hockey. After spells in the ECHL and the UHL, moved to Italy in 2006, signing for Asiago, he scored 9 goals and 16 assists for 25 points, ranking him third amongst the team. While playing for the HC Valpellice Bulldogs, Surma was suspended for 10 months from the Italian ice hockey federation for firing a puck at a referee after the referee had handed out a penalty against him. This was the longest suspension ever handed out in Italy.

He most recently played with the Arizona Sundogs of the Central Hockey League (CHL).

== Career statistics ==
			Regular season					Playoffs
Season	Team	League	GP	G	A	Pts	PIM	GP	G	A	Pts	PIM
1997–98	Compuware Ambassadors	NAHL	54	12	18	30	54	7	1	4	5	10
1998–99	Plymouth Whalers	OHL	65	17	15	32	62	11	3	6	9	15
1999–00	Plymouth Whalers	OHL	66	34	44	78	114	20	9	8	17	10
2000–01	Plymouth Whalers	OHL	55	26	34	60	62	19	8	9	17	25
2001–02	Plymouth Whalers	OHL	55	28	27	55	68	6	3	0	3	10
2001–02	Lowell Lock Monsters	AHL	1	0	0	0	0	4	0	0	0	0
2002–03	Carolina Hurricanes	NHL	1	1	0	1	0	—	—	—	—	—
2002–03	Lowell Lock Monsters	AHL	68	11	11	22	46	—	—	—	—	—
2003–04	Carolina Hurricanes	NHL	1	0	1	1	0	—	—	—	—	—
2003–04	Lowell Lock Monsters	AHL	48	3	5	8	21	—	—	—	—	—
2003–04	Florida Everblades	ECHL	18	6	9	15	20	16	5	4	9	20
2004–05	Florida Everblades	ECHL	72	32	28	60	74	19	7	6	13	14
2005–06	Missouri River Otters	UHL	33	11	19	30	20	—	—	—	—	—
2005–06	Kalamazoo Wings	UHL	38	15	18	33	35	13	4	6	10	18
2006–07	HC Asiago	Italy	32	9	16	25	38	—	—	—	—	—
2007–08	HC Asiago	Italy	34	17	13	30	52	—	—	—	—	—
2008–09	Valpellice Bulldogs	Italy2	17	10	5	15	47	—	—	—	—	—
2008–09	Stockton Thunder	ECHL	41	11	11	22	30	14	3	5	8	8
2009–10	Wichita Thunder	CHL	8	0	2	2	12	—	—	—	—	—
2009–10	Muskegon Lumberjacks	IHL	56	19	27	46	40	7	3	2	5	2
2010–11	Evansville Icemen	CHL	43	22	15	37	43	—	—	—	—	—
2010–11	Dayton Gems	CHL	24	6	15	21	15	3	2	1	3	2
2011–12	Dayton Gems	CHL	65	31	34	65	36	—	—	—	—	—
2012–13	Rapid City Rush	CHL	61	15	29	44	20	5	1	1	2	2
2013–14	Arizona Sundogs	CHL	10	2	1	3	9	—	—	—	—	—
NHL totals			2	1	1	2	0	—	—	—	—	—
AHL totals			117	14	16	30	67	4	0	0	0	0
CHL totals			211	76	96	172	135	8	3	2	5	4
