= Tomáš Kůrka =

Czech ice hockey player (born 1981)

- Born: 14 December 1981 (age 44) Most, Czechoslovakia
- Height: 5 ft 11 in (180 cm)
- Weight: 187 lb (85 kg; 13 st 5 lb)
- Position: Left wing
- Shot: Left
- Played for: Carolina Hurricanes; HC Litvínov; HC Sparta Praha
- NHL draft: 32nd overall, 2000; Carolina Hurricanes
- Playing career: 1998–2020

Tomáš Kůrka (born 14 December 1981) is a Czech former ice hockey forward. He played 17 games in the National Hockey League with the Carolina Hurricanes between 2003 and 2004. The rest of his career, which lasted from 1998 to 2020, was mainly spent in the Czech Extraliga.

== Playing career ==
Kůrka was drafted by the Carolina Hurricanes as their second-round pick, No. 32 overall, in the 2000 NHL entry draft. Kůrka spent two seasons playing junior level in the Ontario Hockey League with the Plymouth Whalers before moving to the Hurricanes organization in 2001.

After spending a season in the American Hockey League with the Lowell Lock Monsters, Kůrka made his NHL debut with the Hurricanes during 2002–03 NHL season, playing 14 games, scoring 3 goals and 2 assists for 5 points. He would go on to play just 3 more games for Carolina, scoring no points. With the 2004–05 NHL season locked-out and eventually cancelled, Kůrka split the season in the AHL with the Providence Bruins and back home in the Czech Republic for HC Litvínov.

He chose to remain in Europe, signing for KalPa in the Finnish SM-liiga. He also played for Ilves in the same league, before moving to Södertälje SK in the Swedish HockeyAllsvenskan.

Kůrka then returned to the Czech Extraliga in 2007, signing for HC České Budějovice. He joined Slavia Prague for a second time in 2011.

On 8 November 2013, Tomas Kůrka was announced as a Cardiff Devils player, he will play his first game for the Devils on Sunday 10 November 2013 against the Hull Stingrays. He scored a Penalty Shot on his full debut.

== Career statistics ==
=== Regular season and playoffs ===
			Regular season					Playoffs
Season	Team	League	GP	G	A	Pts	PIM	GP	G	A	Pts	PIM
1996–97	HC Chemopetrol	CZE U18	37	22	11	33	20	—	—	—	—	—
1997–98	HC Chemopetrol	CZE U18	44	38	23	61	90	—	—	—	—	—
1998–99	HC Chemopetrol	CZE U20	31	20	11	31	—	—	—	—	—	—
1998–99	HC Chemopetrol	CZE	6	0	0	0	0	—	—	—	—	—
1999–00	Plymouth Whalers	OHL	64	36	28	64	37	17	7	6	13	6
2000–01	Plymouth Whalers	OHL	47	15	29	44	20	16	8	13	21	13
2001–02	Lowell Lock Monsters	AHL	71	13	15	28	24	5	1	1	2	2
2002–03	Lowell Lock Monsters	AHL	61	17	12	29	10	—	—	—	—	—
2002–03	Carolina Hurricanes	NHL	14	3	2	5	2	—	—	—	—	—
2003–04	Lowell Lock Monsters	AHL	55	6	26	32	14	—	—	—	—	—
2003–04	Carolina Hurricanes	NHL	3	0	0	0	0	—	—	—	—	—
2004–05	HC Chemopetrol	CZE	29	1	5	6	6	—	—	—	—	—
2004–05	Providence Bruins	AHL	40	8	3	11	4	17	4	3	7	13
2005–06	KalPa	SM-liiga	56	23	11	34	20	—	—	—	—	—
2006–07	Ilves	SM-liiga	19	2	5	7	6	—	—	—	—	—
2006–07	KalPa	SM-liiga	18	3	4	7	8	—	—	—	—	—
2006–07	Södertälje SK	SWE-2	10	2	3	5	0	10	0	1	1	4
2007–08	HC Mountfield	CZE	52	19	15	34	20	—	—	—	—	—
2008–09	HC Mountfield	CZE	50	17	13	30	20	—	—	—	—	—
2009–10	HC Mountfield	CZE	12	7	5	12	4	—	—	—	—	—
2009–10	HC Slavia Praha	CZE	31	17	12	19	31	—	—	—	—	—
2010–11	HC Sparta Praha	CZE	38	4	8	12	12	—	—	—	—	—
2010–11	HC Eaton Pardubice	CZE	7	0	2	2	2	—	—	—	—	—
2011–12	HC Slavia Praha	CZE	42	13	8	21	30	—	—	—	—	—
2011–12	HC Oceláři Třinec	CZE	7	2	3	5	0	5	1	2	3	2
2012–13	Shakhtyor Soligorsk	BLR	36	9	11	20	12	—	—	—	—	—
2012–13	Krefeld Pinguine	DEL	9	2	2	4	0	6	1	3	4	2
2013–14	SC Langenthal	SUI-2	5	1	0	1	2	—	—	—	—	—
2013–14	Cardiff Devils	EIHL	36	23	21	44	14	—	—	—	—	—
2014–15	Sputnik Nizhny Tagil	VHL	51	10	12	22	16	7	0	4	4	4
2015–16	Cardiff Devils	EIHL	51	20	19	39	18	4	1	1	2	0
2016–17	Rostock Piranhas	GER-3	27	15	23	38	36	—	—	—	—	—
2017–18	Rostock Piranhas	GER-3	44	19	28	47	36	—	—	—	—	—
2018–19	Rostock Piranhas	GER-3	47	18	38	56	43	6	2	5	7	4
2019–20	Rostock Piranhas	GER-3	40	15	28	43	24	3	3	0	3	2
CZE totals			274	80	71	151	125	44	11	17	28	37
AHL totals			227	44	56	100	52	22	5	5	10	15
NHL totals			17	3	2	5	2	—	—	—	—	—

=== International ===
Year	Team	Event	GP	G	A	Pts	PIM
1999	Czech Republic	WJC18	7	5	1	6	2
Junior totals			7	5	1	6	2
