= Rob Zepp =

Canadian-born German ice hockey player

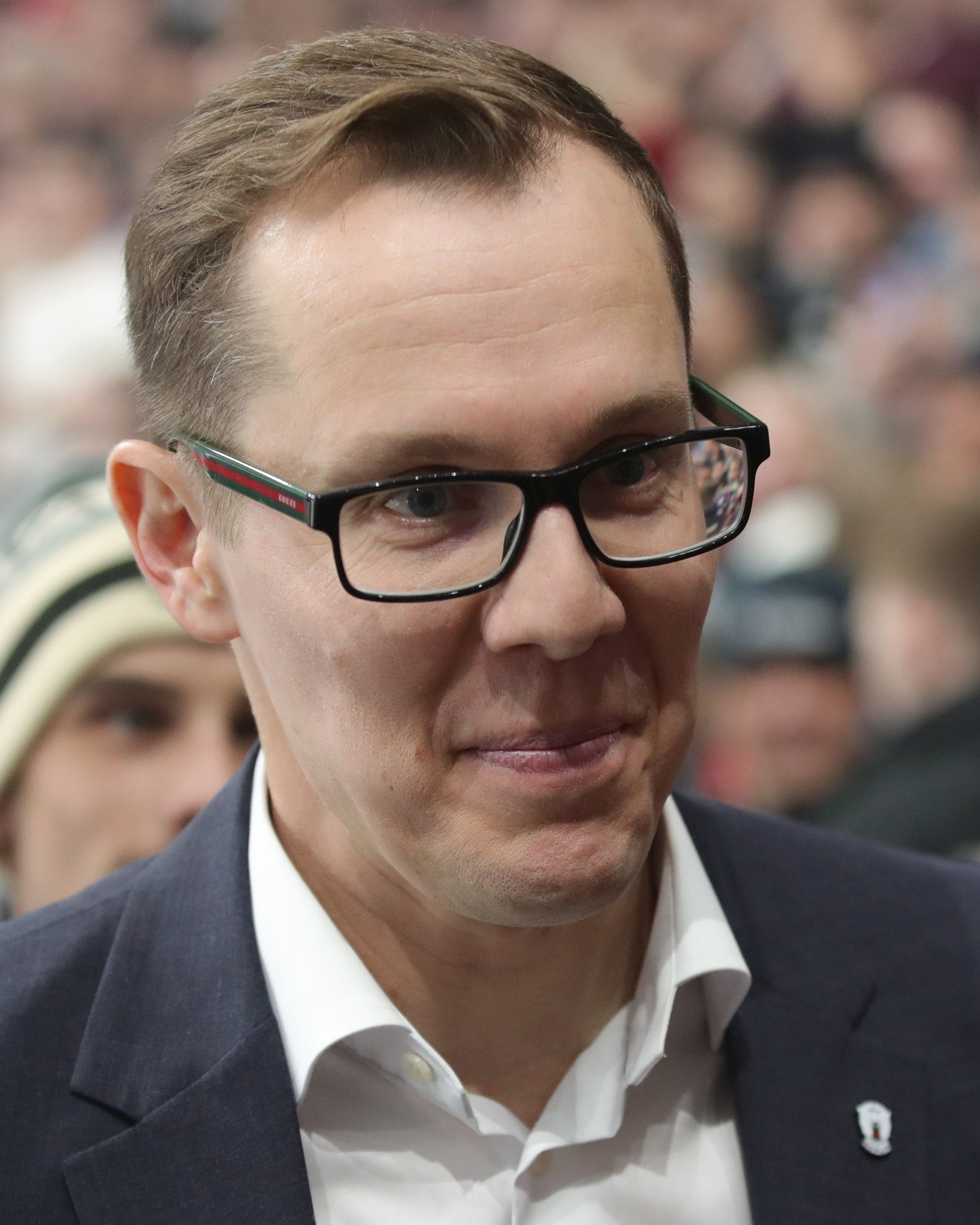
- Zepp in 2024
- Born: September 7, 1981 (age 44) Newmarket, Ontario, Canada
- Height: 6 ft 1 in (185 cm)
- Weight: 194 lb (88 kg; 13 st 12 lb)
- Position: Goaltender
- Caught: Left
- Played for: SaiPa; Eisbären Berlin; Philadelphia Flyers
- National team: Germany
- NHL draft: 99th overall, 1999; Atlanta Thrashers; 110th overall, 2001; Carolina Hurricanes
- Playing career: 2001–2015

Robert Zepp (born September 7, 1981) is a German-Canadian former professional ice hockey goaltender. He played 10 games in the National Hockey League (NHL) with the Philadelphia Flyers during the 2014–15 season. The rest of his career, which lasted from 2001 to 2015, was mainly spent in Europe, playing two seasons in the Finnish SM-liiga for SaiPa and seven seasons in the Deutsche Eishockey Liga for Eisbären Berlin. Internationally Zepp, a naturalized German citizen, played for the German national team at three World Championships.

== Playing career ==
Born in Newmarket, Ontario, Zepp played junior hockey for the Plymouth Whalers in the Ontario Hockey League (OHL). During three standout years with the high-flying Whalers, Zepp was awarded the Dave Pinkney Trophy three years running as a part of the goaltending duo in OHL with the lowest goals against average (GAA). In his first season with the Whalers, Zepp was also awarded the Bobby Smith Trophy as the OHL Scholastic Player of the Year who best combines high standards of play and academic excellence and the CHL Scholastic Player of the Year Award.

Zepp was drafted by the Atlanta Thrashers in the fourth round, 99th overall, in the 1999 NHL entry draft. He never signed a contract with the Thrashers and was drafted by the Carolina Hurricanes in round 4, 110th overall in the 2001 NHL entry draft. He played from 2001 until 2005 with the Florida Everblades of the East Coast Hockey League (ECHL) before deciding to play in Europe, joining SaiPa of the Finnish SM-liiga, where he played two seasons. He then joined Eisbären Berlin in 2007.

On July 1, 2014, Zepp returned to North America by signing a one-year, two-way contract with the Philadelphia Flyers. On December 21, Zepp made his NHL debut against the Winnipeg Jets at the age of 33. Wearing jersey number 72, he made 25 saves out of 28 shots on goal to lead the Flyers to a 4–3 overtime victory.

On April 8, 2025 Zepp was named as one of the 28 Goalies Alex Ovechkin Never Scored On, facing 10 shots from the NHL All Time Goal Scoring leader. Zepp was sent a ceremonial beer by Ovechkin.

== Career statistics ==
=== Regular season and playoffs ===
			Regular season										Playoffs
Season	Team	League	GP	W	L	T	OTL	MIN	GA	SO	GAA	SV%	GP	W	L	MIN	GA	SO	GAA	SV%
1997–98	Newmarket Hurricanes	OPJHL	3	—	—	—	—	181	13	0	4.31	—	—	—	—	—	—	—	—	—
1998–99	Plymouth Whalers	OHL	31	19	3	4	—	1662	76	3	2.74	.907	3	1	0	100	10	0	6.00	.815
1999–00	Plymouth Whalers	OHL	53	36	11	3	—	3005	119	3	2.38	.903	23	15	8	1374	52	2	2.27	.846
2000–01	Plymouth Whalers	OHL	55	34	18	3	—	3246	122	4	2.26	.922	19	14	5	1139	51	2	2.69	.892
2001–02	Florida Everblades	ECHL	13	6	5	2	—	739	41	0	3.33	.902	—	—	—	—	—	—	—	—
2002–03	Florida Everblades	ECHL	41	20	13	7	—	2372	112	3	2.83	.910	—	—	—	—	—	—	—	—
2002–03	Lowell Lock Monsters	AHL	5	1	3	1	—	303	16	1	3.16	.922	—	—	—	—	—	—	—	—
2003–04	Lowell Lock Monsters	AHL	2	0	1	1	—	124	7	0	3.40	.892	—	—	—	—	—	—	—	—
2003–04	Florida Everblades	ECHL	35	14	13	7	—	2052	101	0	2.95	.921	12	8	3	683	31	1	2.72	.911
2004–05	Florida Everblades	ECHL	26	11	10	2	—	1414	63	2	2.67	.910	—	—	—	—	—	—	—	—
2005–06	SaiPa	FIN	44	18	16	—	9	2501	85	4	2.04	.929	8	4	4	526	20	0	2.28	.913
2006–07	SaiPa	FIN	24	8	11	—	4	1278	70	0	3.29	.893	—	—	—	—	—	—	—	—
2006–07	SaPKo	FIN-2	1	—	—	—	—	60	3	0	3.00	.880	—	—	—	—	—	—	—	—
2007–08	Eisbären Berlin	DEL	41	28	12	—	0	2447	107	2	2.62	.902	14	10	4	—	34	0	2.36	.909
2008–09	Eisbären Berlin	DEL	43	28	15	—	0	2569	108	2	2.52	.916	12	10	2	737	26	2	2.12	.924
2009–10	Eisbären Berlin	DEL	50	39	11	—	0	2975	130	5	2.62	.912	5	2	3	293	15	0	3.07	.889
2010–11	Eisbären Berlin	DEL	43	24	16	—	0	2493	100	2	2.41	.913	12	9	3	738	32	0	2.60	.911
2011–12	Eisbären Berlin	DEL	42	26	14	—	0	2430	95	4	2.35	.921	13	—	—	—	—	—	1.69	.941
2012–13	Eisbären Berlin	DEL	46	25	21	—	0	2777	127	5	2.74	.921	13	10	3	760	36	0	2.84	.919
2013–14	Eisbären Berlin	DEL	38	24	14	—	0	2255	90	1	2.39	.931	3	1	2	185	6	1	1.94	.943
2014–15	Philadelphia Flyers	NHL	10	5	2	—	0	520	25	0	2.89	.888	—	—	—	—	—	—	—	—
2014–15	Lehigh Valley Phantoms	AHL	47	21	20	—	4	2734	122	0	2.68	.917	—	—	—	—	—	—	—	—
NHL totals			10	5	2	—	0	520	25	0	2.89	.888	—	—	—	—	—	—	—	—

=== International ===
Year	Team	Event	GP	W	L	T	MIN	GA	SO	GAA	SV%
2010	Germany	WC	2	0	2	0	117	3	0	1.54	.957
2013	Germany	WC	5	3	2	0	302	9	2	1.79	.941
2013	Germany	WC	4	1	3	0	244	13	0	3.20	.856
Senior totals			11	4	5	0	663	25	0	2.26	.920

== Awards and honours ==
Award	Year
Ontario Hockey League
Dave Pinkney Trophy	1999, 2000, 2001
Bobby Smith Trophy	1999
CHL Scholastic Player of the Year	1999
Second All-Star Team	2000, 2001
