= Denis Shvidki =

Ukrainian-born Russian ice hockey player

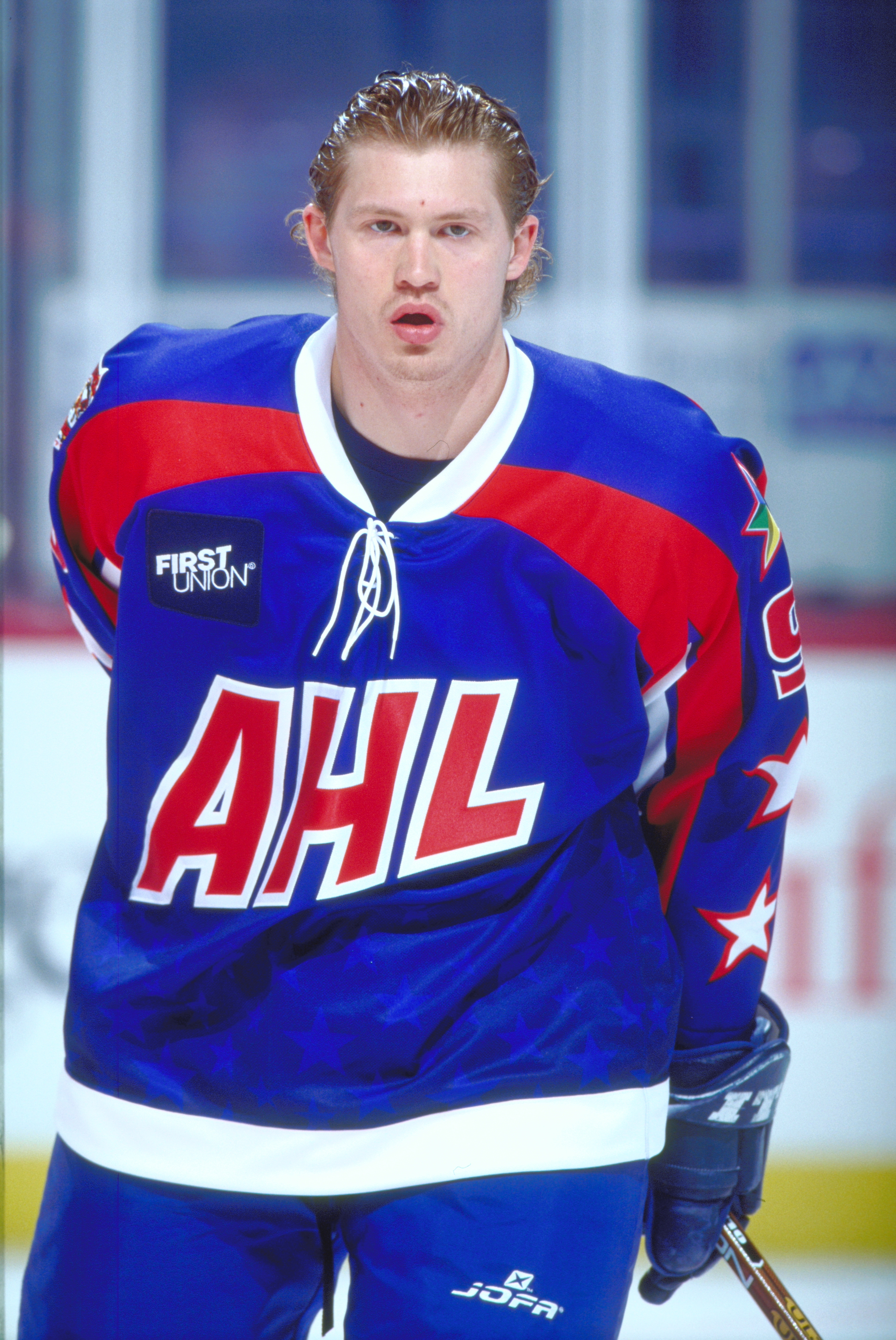
- Born: November 21, 1980 (age 45) Kharkiv, Ukrainian SSR, Soviet Union
- Height: 6 ft 2 in (188 cm)
- Weight: 212 lb (96 kg; 15 st 2 lb)
- Position: Right wing
- Shot: Right
- Played for: Lokomotiv Yaroslavl; Florida Panthers; HC Sibir Novosibirsk; Amur Khabarovsk; SKA Saint Petersburg; Kärpät; Krefeld Pinguine; Hannover Scorpions
- NHL draft: 12th overall, 1999; Florida Panthers
- Playing career: 1996–2014

Denis Aleksandrovich Shvidki (Russian: Денис Александрович Швидкий; born November 21, 1980) is a Ukrainian-born Russian former professional ice hockey right wing who played 76 games in the National Hockey League (NHL) with the Florida Panthers. He was drafted in the first round, 12th overall, by the Panthers in the 1999 NHL entry draft.

== Playing career ==
As a youth, he played in the 1994 Quebec International Pee-Wee Hockey Tournament with a team from Kharkiv.

After playing two seasons with the Russian Superleague's Torpedo Yaroslavl, Shvidki made his North American debut with the Barrie Colts of the Ontario Hockey League in the 1998–99 season. After two seasons with the Colts, he joined the Panthers' American Hockey League affiliate, the Louisville Panthers, in the 2000–01 season. He also appeared in 43 NHL games with the Panthers that season, scoring six goals and adding ten assists.

After three more seasons split between Florida and its minor league affiliates, Shvidki returned to Russia during the 2004–05 NHL lockout and has played there since. Shvidki was reported to transfer to Kärpät Oulu (Finland) in October 2009 for the rest of the season; however, after a month's try-out, Shvidki was released.

Shvidki played a single season in 2012–13, his third in the DEL, with the Hannover Scorpions before signing a one-year contract with 2nd Bundesliga club, Heilbronner Falken, on May 21, 2013. He was released by the club before appearing with the Falken's and completed his professional career in the lower Russian league.

In mid-2015, Shvidki joined the Florida Jr. Panthers hockey club and is still coaching under that organization as of the end of the 2016–17 season.

== Career statistics ==
=== Regular season and playoffs ===
			Regular season					Playoffs
Season	Team	League	GP	G	A	Pts	PIM	GP	G	A	Pts	PIM
1995–96	Torpedo–2 Yaroslavl	RUS.2	36	5	6	11	14	—	—	—	—	—
1996–97	Torpedo Yaroslavl	RSL	17	3	2	5	6	—	—	—	—	—
1996–97	Torpedo–2 Yaroslavl	RUS.3	44	26	14	40	40	—	—	—	—	—
1997–98	Torpedo Yaroslavl	RSL	15	1	1	2	2	—	—	—	—	—
1997–98	Torpedo–2 Yaroslavl	RUS.2	12	7	5	12	10	—	—	—	—	—
1998–99	Barrie Colts	OHL	61	35	59	94	8	12	7	9	16	2
1999–2000	Barrie Colts	OHL	61	41	65	106	55	9	3	1	4	2
2000–01	Louisville Panthers	AHL	34	15	11	26	20	—	—	—	—	—
2000–01	Florida Panthers	NHL	43	6	10	16	16	—	—	—	—	—
2001–02	Florida Panthers	NHL	8	1	2	3	2	—	—	—	—	—
2001–02	Utah Grizzlies	AHL	8	2	4	6	2	—	—	—	—	—
2002–03	Florida Panthers	NHL	23	4	2	6	12	—	—	—	—	—
2002–03	San Antonio Rampage	AHL	54	8	18	26	28	—	—	—	—	—
2003–04	San Antonio Rampage	AHL	77	15	39	54	30	—	—	—	—	—
2003–04	Florida Panthers	NHL	2	0	0	0	0	—	—	—	—	—
2004–05	Lokomotiv Yaroslavl	RSL	53	7	11	18	24	4	0	0	0	8
2005–06	Sibir Novosibirsk	RSL	25	1	5	6	6	2	0	1	1	0
2005–06	Sibir–2 Novosibirsk	RUS.3	1	1	1	2	0	—	—	—	—	—
2006–07	Amur Khabarovsk	RSL	32	6	5	11	32	—	—	—	—	—
2007–08	SKA Saint Petersburg	RSL	35	7	9	16	24	—	—	—	—	—
2008–09	SKA Saint Petersburg	KHL	37	3	4	7	22	—	—	—	—	—
2009–10	Kärpät	SM-l	4	0	2	2	2	—	—	—	—	—
2009–10	HC Yugra	RUS.2	12	2	3	5	6	10	1	2	3	4
2010–11	Krefeld Pinguine	DEL	32	1	7	8	14	8	2	3	5	12
2011–12	Krefeld Pinguine	DEL	49	4	9	13	30	—	—	—	—	—
2012–13	Hannover Scorpions	DEL	21	2	2	4	10	—	—	—	—	—
2013–14	Titan Klin	VHL	5	0	0	0	0	—	—	—	—	—
2013–14	HC Csíkszereda	MOL	11	7	3	10	2	—	—	—	—	—
RSL totals			177	25	33	58	94	6	0	1	1	8
AHL totals			173	40	72	112	80	—	—	—	—	—
NHL totals			76	11	14	25	30	—	—	—	—	—

=== International ===
Medal record

Representing Russia

Ice hockey

World Junior Championships
Gold medal – first place	1999 Canada	
Silver medal – second place	1998 Finland	
Silver medal – second place	2000 Sweden	

Year	Team	Event	Result	GP	G	A	Pts	PIM
1997	Russia	EJC18	4th	5	1	1	2	2
1998	Russia	WJC	2nd place, silver medalist(s)	7	0	1	1	6
1998	Russia	EJC18	3rd place, bronze medalist(s)	6	2	9	11	31
1999	Russia	WJC	1st place, gold medalist(s)	7	1	4	5	0
2000	Russia	WJC	2nd place, silver medalist(s)	7	2	2	4	0
Junior totals				32	6	17	23	39

== Awards and honours ==
Award	Year
OHL
CHL/NHL Top Prospects Game	1999
J. Ross Robertson Cup (Barrie Colts)	2000
AHL
All-Star Game	2001, 2004

Awards and achievements
Preceded by Mike Brown	Florida Panthers first-round draft pick 1999	Succeeded by Stephen Weiss
