= Jason Jaspers =

Canadian ice hockey player (born 1981)

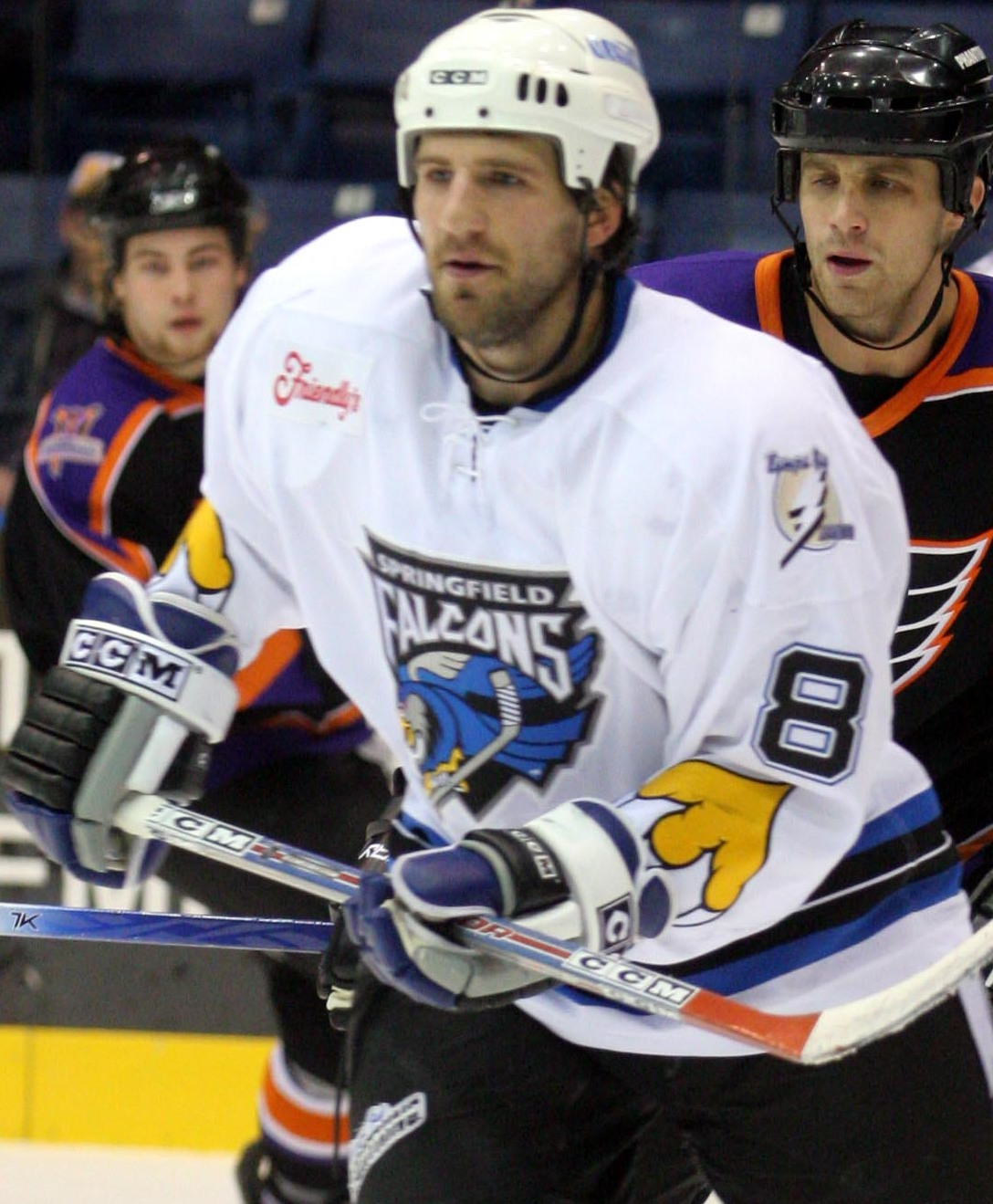
- Jaspers with the Springfield Falcons in 2005
- Born: April 8, 1981 (age 45) Thunder Bay, Ontario, Canada
- Height: 5 ft 11 in (180 cm)
- Weight: 207 lb (94 kg; 14 st 11 lb)
- Position: Centre
- Shot: Left
- Played for: Phoenix Coyotes; Adler Mannheim; Kölner Haie; Thomas Sabo Ice Tigers; Iserlohn Roosters; Eisbären Berlin; Grizzlys Wolfsburg
- NHL draft: 71st overall, 1999; Phoenix Coyotes
- Playing career: 2001–2019

Jason Matthew Jaspers (born April 8, 1981) is a Canadian former professional ice hockey centre who played with the Phoenix Coyotes in the National Hockey League (NHL) and extensively in the Deutsche Eishockey Liga (DEL). He is currently the head coach of HC Pustertal Wölfe of the ICE Hockey League in Italy.

== Playing career ==
Jaspers was drafted 71st overall by the Phoenix Coyotes in the 1999 NHL entry draft. He was drafted from the Sudbury Wolves of the Ontario Hockey League. Jaspers made his professional debut in the 2001–02 season with the Coyotes affiliate the Springfield Falcons of the American Hockey League. Jaspers made his NHL debut in the same season, after he received his first NHL call-up on January 20, 2002.

Jaspers then spent the next four years primarily with the Falcons of the AHL. Unable to crack the NHL regularly he was traded by the Coyotes to the Tampa Bay Lightning for Jarrod Skalde on July 25, 2005. Jason however never played a game with the Lightning, instead playing for their affiliate, coincidentally still the Springfield Falcons.

Jaspers finally left the Falcons, ranking second in all-time appearances, in the 2006–07 season when he signed with German team Adler Mannheim, on July 6, 2006. After three years with Adler Mannheim signed on April 6, 2009, with Kölner Haie.

Jaspers played for three seasons with the Thomas Sabo Ice Tigers, before opting to sign a one-year contract to continue his professional career in the DEL with the Iserlohn Roosters on June 23, 2015.

After three seasons with the Roosters, Jaspers left the club at the conclusion of his contract, playing on a try-out through pre-season before signing a one-year deal with Eisbären Berlin prior to the 2018–19 season on September 11, 2018. He played in just 9 games with Eisbären Berlin before opting to terminate his contract in order to join his sixth DEL club, Grizzlys Wolfsburg, on October 10, 2018. Jaspers played out the remainder of the regular season with Grizzlys, adding 8 points in 29 games, before leaving the club at the conclusion of the year.

== Personal life ==
In July 2008, Jaspers married his high school sweetheart, Morgan McKee. McKee is from Sudbury, Ontario where Jason played junior hockey for the Sudbury Wolves. Jason divorced Morgan in 2012.

== Career statistics ==
			Regular season					Playoffs
Season	Team	League	GP	G	A	Pts	PIM	GP	G	A	Pts	PIM
1998–99	Sudbury Wolves	OHL	68	28	33	61	81	4	2	1	3	13
1999–00	Sudbury Wolves	OHL	68	46	61	107	107	12	4	6	10	27
2000–01	Sudbury Wolves	OHL	63	42	42	84	77	12	3	16	19	18
2001–02	Springfield Falcons	AHL	71	25	23	48	55	—	—	—	—	—
2001–02	Phoenix Coyotes	NHL	4	0	1	1	4	—	—	—	—	—
2002–03	Springfield Falcons	AHL	63	4	15	19	57	6	0	0	0	4
2002–03	Phoenix Coyotes	NHL	2	0	0	0	0	—	—	—	—	—
2003–04	Springfield Falcons	AHL	58	16	22	38	56	—	—	—	—	—
2003–04	Phoenix Coyotes	NHL	3	0	0	0	2	—	—	—	—	—
2004–05	Utah Grizzlies	AHL	11	0	3	3	6	—	—	—	—	—
2004–05	Springfield Falcons	AHL	48	12	17	29	45	—	—	—	—	—
2005–06	Springfield Falcons	AHL	77	29	37	66	86	—	—	—	—	—
2006–07	Adler Mannheim	DEL	48	14	15	29	102	11	6	7	13	6
2007–08	Adler Mannheim	DEL	31	12	13	25	30	2	0	0	0	0
2008–09	Adler Mannheim	DEL	52	9	20	29	34	9	4	5	9	22
2009–10	Kölner Haie	DEL	55	18	31	49	49	3	1	1	2	0
2010–11	Kölner Haie	DEL	52	20	21	41	32	5	1	3	4	4
2011–12	Kölner Haie	DEL	52	13	27	40	34	6	3	2	5	4
2012–13	Thomas Sabo Ice Tigers	DEL	52	7	24	31	30	3	0	0	0	2
2013–14	Thomas Sabo Ice Tigers	DEL	52	8	22	30	24	6	1	4	5	2
2014–15	Thomas Sabo Ice Tigers	DEL	50	15	20	35	40	8	2	1	3	6
2015–16	Iserlohn Roosters	DEL	52	16	26	42	34	6	2	1	3	2
2016–17	Iserlohn Roosters	DEL	51	11	17	28	63	—	—	—	—	—
2017–18	Iserlohn Roosters	DEL	46	17	12	29	14	2	0	0	0	0
2018–19	Eisbären Berlin	DEL	9	1	0	1	0	—	—	—	—	—
2018–19	Grizzlys Wolfsburg	DEL	29	5	3	8	14	—	—	—	—	—
NHL totals			9	0	1	1	6	—	—	—	—	—

== Awards and honours ==
Award	Year
OHL
Plus/minus Award	2000
Second All-Star Team	2000
