= Brian Finley =

Canadian ice hockey player (born 1981)

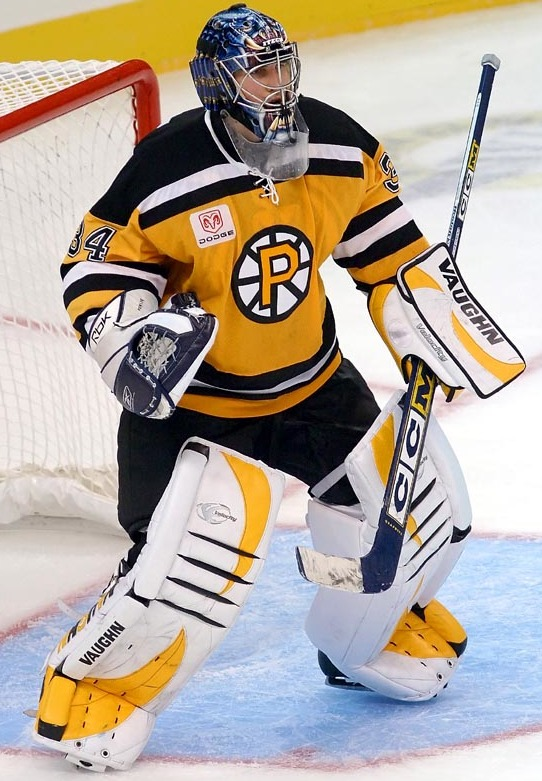
- Finley with the Providence Bruins in 2006
- Born: July 3, 1981 (age 45) Sault Ste. Marie, Ontario, Canada
- Height: 6 ft 2 in (188 cm)
- Weight: 205 lb (93 kg; 14 st 9 lb)
- Position: Goaltender
- Caught: Right
- Played for: Nashville Predators; Boston Bruins
- NHL draft: 6th overall, 1999; Nashville Predators
- Playing career: 2002–2007

Brian Finley (born July 13, 1981) is a Canadian former professional ice hockey goaltender. He played for the Nashville Predators and Boston Bruins of the National Hockey League.

== Playing career ==
Finley was born in Sault Ste. Marie, Ontario. As a youth, he played in the 1995 Quebec International Pee-Wee Hockey Tournament with a minor ice hockey team from Sault Ste. Marie. Finley was a standout junior goaltender played most of his junior hockey with the Barrie Colts of the Ontario Hockey League (OHL). In 1999, Finley won the OHL Goaltender of the Year. He was among the leaders of the Colts that won the J. Ross Robertson Cup as champions of the OHL and went on to the 2000 Memorial Cup Finals where they lost to the Rimouski Océanic 6–3. Finley was a member of Team Canada at the IIHF World Junior Championships in 1999 where he won a silver medal and 2000, where he won a bronze medal. He was invited to try out a third time for the 2001 tournament.

As a top-rated goaltender Finley was drafted by the Nashville Predators of the National Hockey League (NHL) in the first round, sixth overall of the 1999 NHL entry draft. He signed a three-year contract with the Predators, including a sizeable signing bonus. He was invited to the 2000–01 Predators training camp and started in four games. He was sent back to the Colts following the camp as Mike Dunham's contract holdout had been resolved. However, after playing 20 games, Finley suffered a serious groin injury that required surgery. The Colts traded Finley to the Brampton Battalion at the trade deadline for three players and two draft picks.

Finley joined the Predators the following year and spent the next few years with Nashville's American Hockey League (AHL) affiliate, the Milwaukee Admirals. He made his NHL debut on January 1, 2003 in relief of the injured Tomáš Vokoun, allowing three goals. He won the Calder Cup with the Admirals in 2004. On November 28, 2005, Finley was named AHL player of the week. He was named AHL Goaltender of the Month for November on December 1, 2005.

Finley was an unrestricted free agent following the 2005–06 season. He signed with the Boston Bruins on July 17, 2006. During the 2006–07 season he played ten games for Boston's AHL affiliate, the Providence Bruins, and two games for Boston. In his first appearance for Boston, he replaced Tim Thomas in net, giving up two goals in a 6–4 loss to the Toronto Maple Leafs. This would be his last professional season, as after the 2006–07 season Finley chose to retire after appearing in four NHL games.

== Personal ==
Following his retirement from professional hockey, Finley became a police officer with York Regional Police since 2009.

== Career statistics ==
=== Regular season and playoffs ===
			Regular season										Playoffs
Season	Team	League	GP	W	L	T	OTL	MIN	GA	SO	GAA	SV%	GP	W	L	MIN	GA	SO	GAA	SV%
1997–98	Barrie Colts	OHL	41	23	14	1	—	2154	105	3	2.92	.917	5	1	3	260	13	0	3.00	.918
1998–99	Barrie Colts	OHL	52	36	10	4	—	3063	136	3	2.66	.920	5	4	1	323	15	0	2.79	.917
1999–2000	Barrie Colts	OHL	47	24	12	6	—	2540	130	2	3.07	.916	23	14	8	1353	58	1	2.57	.923
2000–01	Barrie Colts	OHL	16	5	8	0	—	818	42	0	3.08	.912	—	—	—	—	—	—	—	—
2000–01	Brampton Battalion	OHL	11	7	3	1	—	631	31	0	2.95	.900	9	5	4	503	26	1	3.10	.916
2002–03	Nashville Predators	NHL	1	0	0	0	—	47	3	0	3.86	.769	—	—	—	—	—	—	—	—
2002–03	Milwaukee Admirals	AHL	22	7	11	2	—	1207	59	2	2.93	.898	—	—	—	—	—	—	—	—
2002–03	Toledo Storm	ECHL	7	4	2	0	—	305	12	0	2.36	.918	1	0	1	60	4	0	4.00	.889
2003–04	Milwaukee Admirals	AHL	43	23	15	4	—	2561	100	2	2.34	.918	1	0	1	59	2	0	2.05	.917
2004–05	Milwaukee Admirals	AHL	64	36	22	—	4	3642	139	7	2.29	.921	7	3	4	458	20	1	2.62	.913
2005–06	Milwaukee Admirals	AHL	32	18	7	—	2	1708	77	4	2.70	.908	8	3	2	415	20	0	2.89	.892
2005–06	Nashville Predators	NHL	1	0	1	—	0	60	7	0	7.00	.829	—	—	—	—	—	—	—	—
2006–07	Boston Bruins	NHL	2	0	1	—	0	59	3	0	3.04	.909	—	—	—	—	—	—	—	—
2006–07	Providence Bruins	AHL	10	6	3	—	0	576	29	1	3.02	.893	—	—	—	—	—	—	—	—
NHL totals			4	0	2	0	0	166	13	0	4.70	.851	—	—	—	—	—	—	—	—
AHL totals			171	90	58	6	6	9,694	404	16	2.50	.913	16	6	7	932	42	1	2.70	.904

=== International ===
Year	Team	Event	GP	W	L	T	MIN	GA	SO	GAA	SV%
1999	Canada	WJC	1	0	0	0	20	2	0	6.00	.667
2000	Canada	WJC	1	1	0	0	60	3	0	3.00	.921
Junior totals			2	1	0	0	80	5	0	3.75	—

Awards and achievements
Preceded by David Legwand	Nashville Predators first-round draft pick 1999	Succeeded by Scott Hartnell
