= Michael Henrich =

Canadian ice hockey player (born 1980)

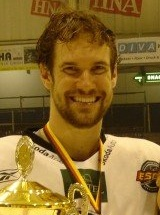
- Henrich in 2007
- Born: March 4, 1980 (age 46) Toronto, Ontario, Canada
- Height: 6 ft 3 in (191 cm)
- Weight: 210 lb (95 kg; 15 st 0 lb)
- Position: Right Wing/Centre/Defence
- Shot: Right
- Played for: AHL; Hamilton Bulldogs; Hershey Bears; Toronto Roadrunners; DEL; Füchse Duisburg; Grizzly Adams Wolfsburg; Serie A HC Asiago; EBEL; Dornbirner EC; EIHL; Coventry Blaze
- NHL draft: 13th overall, 1998; Edmonton Oilers
- Playing career: 2000–2014
Medal record
Ice hockey
Representing Canada
Maccabiah Games
Gold medal – first place	1997 Israel	Ice hockey

Michael Henrich (born March 4, 1980) is a Canadian former professional ice hockey player. A National Hockey League (NHL) first-round draft pick of the Edmonton Oilers in 1998, Henrich played several years of professional hockey in North America before moving to professional hockey in Europe. Henrich is the first Jewish player to be selected in the first round of the NHL entry draft, and the only player taken in the first round of the 1998 NHL entry draft who did not play a regular season game in the NHL.

Henrich's younger brother Adam Henrich was also a former professional hockey player for the Coventry Blaze.

== Personal life ==
Henrich, who is Jewish, is from Thornhill, Ontario.

== Playing career ==
=== Junior ===
Michael Henrich had a standout junior career with the Barrie Colts from 1996 to 2000 in the Ontario Hockey League. Barrie drafted him 5th overall in the 1996 Ontario Hockey League priority selection draft out of the Metro Toronto Hockey Leagues Midget Wexford Raiders.

In 1997 he was selected to the Ontario Hockey League all-star game, was voted MVP for Team Orr at the CHL/NHL Top Prospects Game and was voted by the Ontario Hockey League eastern conference coaches poll as best shot, hardest shot and most dangerous in the goal area.

In 1999–2000 he was an assistant captain of the Ontario Hockey League champion Barrie Colts. Barrie competed in the 2000 Memorial Cup in Halifax finishing runner-up.

=== 1998 NHL Draft and North American Hockey ===
Prior to the 1998 NHL entry draft in Buffalo, New York, Henrich was rated high by the NHL's Central Scouting Service who ranked him 3rd in their initial rankings amongst North American skaters, and by many sportswriters, including USA Today's Phil Colvin, who had him ranked as the third best prospect in the draft behind David Legwand and Vincent Lecavalier.

Henrich was ultimately selected 13th overall by the Edmonton Oilers. He was selected ahead of eight future NHL All-Stars including Simon Gagne (22nd overall), Scott Gomez (27th overall), Brad Richards (64th overall), and Pavel Datsyuk (171st overall). As a result of Henrich not playing a regular season NHL game, coupled with the large number of NHL all-stars drafted after him, many sportswriters and networks cite him as an example of a draft bust, with NHL.com columnist and hockey author John Kreiser even listing Henrich as one of Edmonton's all-time biggest draft disappointments alongside Jason Bonsignore and Scott Allison.

His professional career in North America lasted four seasons in which he played a total of 9 preseason games for the Edmonton Oilers scoring 1 goal and 1 assist. He also played 219 games for the Hamilton Bulldogs, Toronto Roadrunners and Hershey Bears of the American Hockey League and 6 games with the Tallahassee Tiger Sharks of the ECHL.

=== International ===
In 1996–97 Henrich competed for Team Ontario at the World U-17 Hockey Challenge in Red Deer, Alberta where Team Ontario won the gold medal. He was selected to the Canada men's national junior ice hockey team selection camp in 1998 and 1999. He represented Canada men's national ice hockey team at the Deutschland Cup in Hannover, Germany in 2002 where Canada finished as champion. In 2003, he represented Canada men's national ice hockey team at the Sweden Hockey Games in Stockholm, Sweden, where Canada placed third.

Henrich played hockey for Team Canada at the age of 17 at the 1997 Maccabiah Games in Israel where the team won a gold medal.

=== Europe ===
Henrich played in the HockeyAllsvenskan for Mora IK in 2002. He spent the 2004–05 NHL lockout with the Austrian National League team EK Zell am See and won the league championship. In 2005, he played for the Füchse Duisburg of the DEL. In 2006, he played for the Grizzly Adams Wolfsburg of the 2nd Bundesliga and won the league championship. In 2008 he signed with Lega Italiana Hockey Ghiaccio club HC Asiago and won the league championship. He was a member of Dornbirner EC of the Erste Bank Eishockey Liga in 2012 and finished his career in 2014 with the Coventry Blaze of the Elite Ice Hockey League.

== Career statistics ==
			Regular season					Playoffs
Season	Team	League	GP	G	A	Pts	PIM	GP	G	A	Pts	PIM
1995–96	Wexford Raiders AAA	GTHL	72	31	40	71	50	—	—	—	—	—
1995–96	Wexford Raiders	MetJHL	4	1	0	1	0	—	—	—	—	—
1996–97	Barrie Colts	OHL	52	9	15	24	19	9	0	5	5	0
1997–98	Barrie Colts	OHL	66	41	22	63	75	5	1	3	4	0
1998–99	Barrie Colts	OHL	62	38	33	71	42	12	0	2	2	4
1999–2000	Barrie Colts	OHL	66	38	48	86	69	25	10	18	28	30
2000–01	Tallahassee Tiger Sharks	ECHL	6	1	1	2	0	—	—	—	—	—
2000–01	Hamilton Bulldogs	AHL	73	5	10	15	36	—	—	—	—	—
2001–02	Hamilton Bulldogs	AHL	67	14	24	38	24	9	2	2	4	2
2002–03	Hamilton Bulldogs	AHL	12	0	0	0	2	—	—	—	—	—
2002–03	Mora IK	SWE.2	12	3	1	4	16	—	—	—	—	—
2002–03	Hershey Bears	AHL	9	0	1	1	4	1	0	0	0	0
2003–04	Toronto Roadrunners	AHL	58	14	10	24	28	3	2	0	2	0
2004–05	EK Zell am See	AUT	34	42	35	77	122	—	—	—	—	—
2005–06	Füchse Duisburg	DEL	43	10	11	21	34	—	—	—	—	—
2006–07	Grizzly Adams Wolfsburg	DEU.2	48	16	20	36	94	10	8	4	12	6
2007–08	Grizzlys Adams Wolfsburg	DEL	56	16	15	31	26	—	—	—	—	—
2009–10	HC Asiago	ITA	39	27	33	60	22	15	7	11	18	10
2010–11	HC Asiago	ITA	40	22	27	49	20	17	13	6	19	8
2011–12	HC Asiago	ITA	44	24	17	41	10	4	0	0	0	0
2012–13	Dornbirner EC	AUT	54	17	20	37	37	—	—	—	—	—
2013–14	Coventry Blaze	GBR	43	16	31	47	18	2	0	0	0	0
AHL totals			219	33	45	78	94	13	4	2	6	2
ITA totals			123	73	77	150	52	36	20	17	37	18

== See also ==
- List of select Jewish ice hockey players

Preceded by Michel Riesen	Edmonton Oilers first-round draft pick 1998	Succeeded by Jani Rita
