= Alexander Buturlin (ice hockey) =

Russian ice hockey player (born 1981)

Aleksandr Buturlin
- Born: 3 September 1981 (age 44) Moscow, Russian SFSR, Soviet Union
- Height: 6 ft 0 in (183 cm)
- Weight: 198 lb (90 kg; 14 st 2 lb)
- Position: Right wing
- Shot: Left
- National team: Russia
- NHL draft: 39th overall, 1999; Montreal Canadiens
- Playing career: 1998–2013

Aleksandr Mikhalovich Buturlin (Russian: Александр Михайлович Бутурлин; born September 3, 1981) is a Russian professional ice hockey winger who played with HC Spartak Moscow in the Kontinental Hockey League during the 2010–11 KHL season. He was selected by the Montreal Canadiens in the second round (39th overall) of the 1999 NHL entry draft.

== Career statistics ==
			Regular season					Playoffs
Season	Team	League	GP	G	A	Pts	PIM	GP	G	A	Pts	PIM
1997–98	CSKA Moskva	Russia	2	0	0	0	0	—	—	—	—	—
1998–99	CSKA Moskva	Russia	17	1	1	2	6	3	1	0	1	2
1999–00	Sarnia Sting	OHL	57	20	27	47	46	7	4	2	6	12
2000–01	Sarnia Sting	OHL	47	28	37	65	27	4	3	1	4	0
2001–02	Salavat Yulaev Ufa	Russia	33	3	3	6	42	—	—	—	—	—
2002–03	Lada Togliatti	Russia	49	6	14	20	71	10	3	0	3	4
2003–04	Lada Togliatti	Russia	53	7	13	20	78	6	0	1	1	4
2004–05	Lada Togliatti	Russia	56	9	11	20	46	10	3	6	9	8
2005–06	Lada Togliatti	Russia	51	8	12	20	80	8	1	2	3	16
2006–07	Lada Togliatti	Russia	54	8	13	21	64	3	1	1	2	4
2007–08	Salavat Yulaev Ufa	Russia	5	0	0	0	2	—	—	—	—	—
2007–08	Salavat Yulaev Ufa-2	Russia3	6	5	11	16	6	—	—	—	—	—
2007–08	HK MVD	Russia	33	7	5	12	16	3	0	0	0	2
2008–09	Lada Togliatti	KHL	40	5	6	11	40	4	0	0	0	2
2008–09	Lada Togliatti-2	Russia3	12	10	11	21	2	—	—	—	—	—
2009–10	Spartak Moskva	KHL	56	4	11	15	16	10	3	4	7	16
2010–11	Spartak Moskva	KHL	16	1	1	2	6	—	—	—	—	—
2010–11	Traktor Chelyabinsk	KHL	35	7	10	17	22	—	—	—	—	—
2011–12	Traktor Chelyabinsk	KHL	54	3	4	7	24	16	0	0	0	10
2012–13	Amur Khabarovsk	KHL	22	1	1	2	26	—	—	—	—	—
2012–13	Kuban Krasnodar	VHL	25	4	5	9	42	—	—	—	—	—
KHL totals			223	21	33	54	134	30	3	4	7	28
