= Lukáš Havel (ice hockey) =

Czech ice hockey player

- Born: November 10, 1981 (age 43); Jihlava, Czechoslovakia
- Height: 5 ft 9 in (175 cm)
- Weight: 176 lb (80 kg; 12 st 8 lb)
- Position: Forward
- Shoots: Left
- Czech Extraliga team: HC Oceláři Třinec
- Playing career: 2001–present

Lukáš Havel (born November 10, 1981) is a Czech professional ice hockey player. He played with HC Oceláři Třinec in the Czech Extraliga during the 2010–11 Czech Extraliga season.
