= Jason Baird =

Australian make-up artist

- Occupation: Make-up artist

Jason Baird is an Australian make-up artist. He was nominated for an Academy Award in the category Best Makeup and Hairstyling for the film Elvis.

At the 76th British Academy Film Awards, he won a BAFTA Award for Best Makeup and Hair. His win was shared with Mark Coulier, Louise Coulston and Shane Thomas.

== Selected filmography ==
- Elvis (2022)
