= Adam Henrich =

Canadian ice hockey player

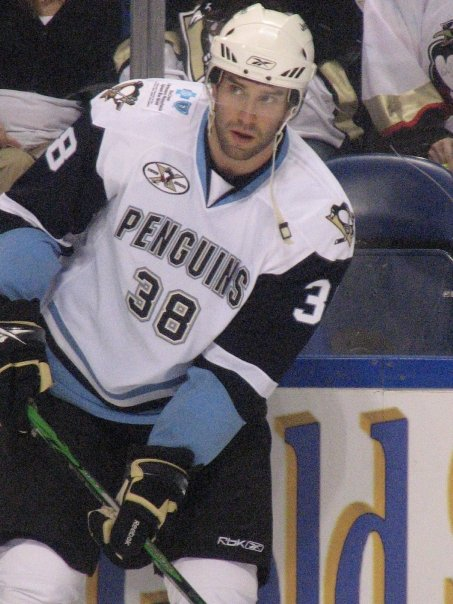
- Born: January 19, 1984 (age 42) Thornhill, Ontario, Canada
- Height: 6 ft 5 in (196 cm)
- Weight: 225 lb (102 kg; 16 st 1 lb)
- Position: Left wing
- Shot: Left
- Played for: Springfield Falcons; Norfolk Admirals; WBS Penguins
- NHL draft: 60th overall, 2002; Tampa Bay Lightning
- Playing career: 2004–2014

Adam Henrich (born January 19, 1984) is a Canadian former professional ice hockey player.

Henrich was drafted as the 60th overall selection in the 2002 NHL entry draft by the Tampa Bay Lightning. He was Tampa Bay's first selection of the draft. Henrich has also played for the Wilkes-Barre/Scranton Penguins, Springfield Falcons and Norfolk Admirals. Overall, he has played on 13 teams in 7 leagues in his hockey career.

== Playing career ==
Henrich played for Team Canada at the 1997 Maccabiah Games and the 2013 Maccabiah Games in Israel, where they won gold medals.

Henrich played minor hockey in Greater Toronto, where he was a member of the provincial champion peewee Toronto Marlies in 1998, on a team that included Rick Nash.

Henrich was drafted in the first round, seventh overall by the Brampton Battalion in the 2000 OHL Priority Selection. Henrich subsequently enjoyed a successful junior career playing four seasons for the Battalion. He tied four Battalion playoff records, including most games played (32) and most power-play goals (4) in a career. His 98 career Battalion goals rank fifth all time behind only Wojtek Wolski, Cody Hodgson, Raffi Torres and Luke Lynes.

Ahead of the 2002 NHL entry draft, Henrich was ranked 23rd by NHL Central Scouting. As a result, he was among a group of top prospects invited to the NHL Draft Combine. At the Draft on June 22, Henrich was selected in the second round, 60th overall by the Tampa Bay Lightning.

Henrich had his strongest year for the Norfolk Admirals of the American Hockey League in the 2007–08 season.

== Personal life ==
Henrich comes from a family of athletes. He has an older brother, Michael Henrich, who was drafted 13th overall by the Edmonton Oilers in the 1998 NHL entry draft.

Henrich is Jewish. Henrich has been an advocate for Israeli hockey and the Israel Ice Hockey Federation.

== Career statistics ==
=== Regular season and playoffs ===
			Regular season					Playoffs
Season	Team	League	GP	G	A	Pts	PIM	GP	G	A	Pts	PIM
2000–01	Brampton Battalion	OHL	48	5	4	9	27	9	0	0	0	6
2001–02	Brampton Battalion	OHL	66	33	30	63	92	—	—	—	—	—
2002–03	Brampton Battalion	OHL	63	31	33	64	74	11	4	1	5	25
2003–04	Brampton Battalion	OHL	65	29	29	58	146	12	5	1	6	24
2004–05	Springfield Falcons	AHL	63	10	16	26	97	—	—	—	—	—
2004–05	Johnstown Chiefs	ECHL	6	2	1	3	15	—	—	—	—	—
2005–06	Springfield Falcons	AHL	12	0	3	3	14	—	—	—	—	—
2005–06	Johnstown Chiefs	ECHL	51	18	23	41	78	5	2	4	6	8
2006–07	Springfield Falcons	AHL	27	3	6	9	31	—	—	—	—	—
2006–07	Johnstown Chiefs	ECHL	32	15	19	34	119	2	0	0	0	2
2007–08	Norfolk Admirals	AHL	43	14	17	31	88	—	—	—	—	—
2007–08	Wheeling Nailers	ECHL	12	10	10	20	34	—	—	—	—	—
2008–09	Wilkes–Barre/Scranton Penguins	AHL	37	3	8	11	34	2	0	0	0	0
2009–10	Ontario Reign	ECHL	8	5	4	9	10	—	—	—	—	—
2009–10	Cincinnati Cyclones	ECHL	2	0	0	0	2	—	—	—	—	—
2009–10	Springfield Falcons	AHL	5	2	1	3	15	—	—	—	—	—
2009–10	Hamburg Freezers	DEL	11	1	0	1	68	—	—	—	—	—
2010–11	HC Asiago	ITA	35	23	31	54	85	17	11	14	25	38
2011–12	Alleghe Hockey	ITA	45	14	37	51	98	9	2	5	7	49
2012–13	SC Riessersee	GER.2	19	5	7	12	57	—	—	—	—	—
2012–13	Coventry Blaze	EIHL	14	13	8	21	56	4	3	4	7	4
2013–14	Coventry Blaze	EIHL	38	21	30	51	101	2	0	0	0	0
2016–17	Dundas Real McCoys	ACH	—	—	—	—	—	2	0	0	0	0
AHL totals			187	32	51	83	279	2	0	0	0	0
ECHL totals			111	50	57	107	258	7	2	4	6	10

=== International ===
Year	Team	Event	GP	G	A	Pts	PIM
2002	Canada	WJC18	8	0	3	3	43
Junior totals			8	0	3	3	43

== See also ==
- List of select Jewish ice hockey players
