= Levente Szuper =

Hungarian former professional goaltender (born 1980)

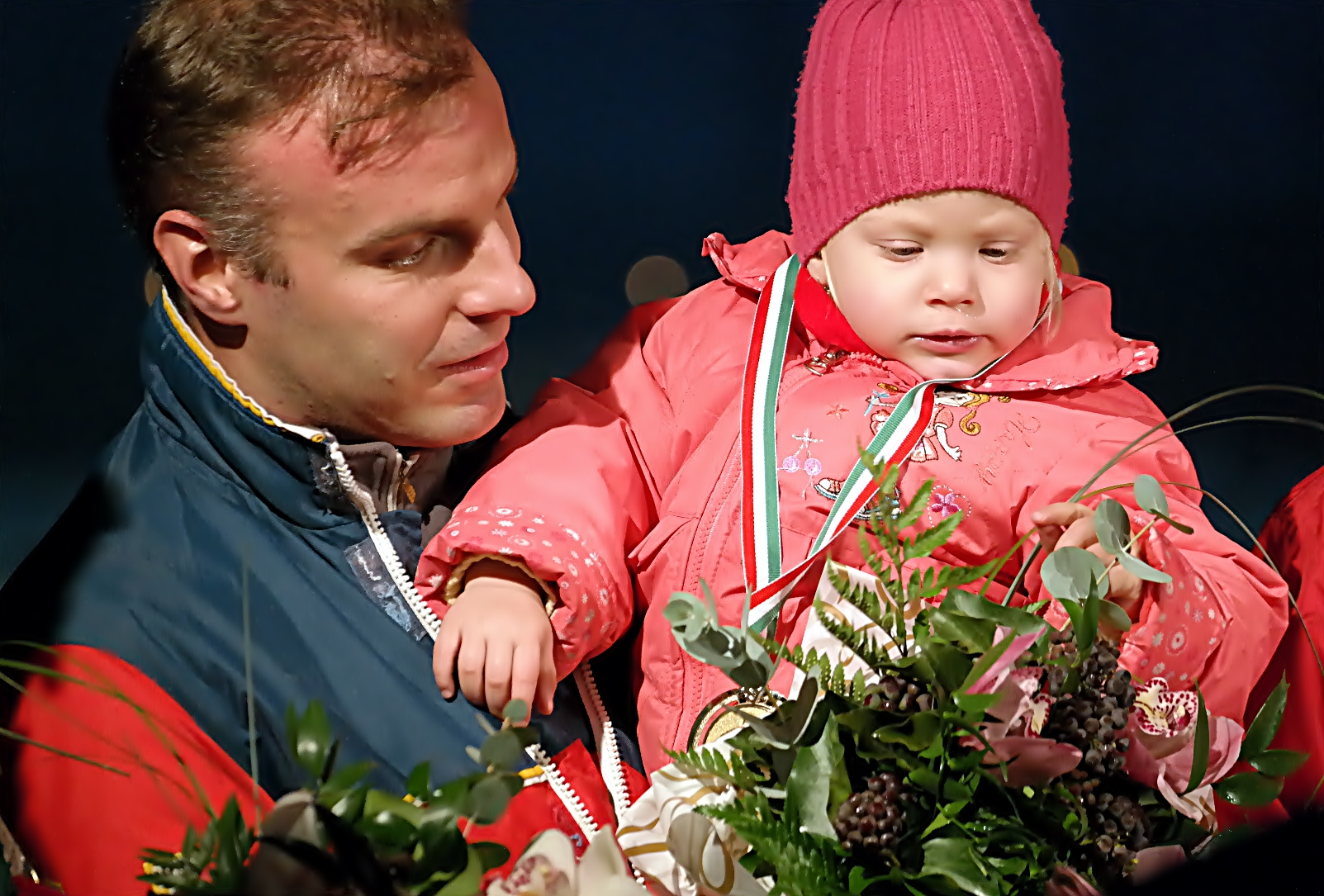
- Szuper with his daughter in 2013
- Born: June 11, 1980 (age 45) Budapest, Hungary
- Height: 5 ft 11 in (180 cm)
- Weight: 175 lb (79 kg; 12 st 7 lb)
- Position: Goaltender
- Caught: Left
- Played for: AHL; St. John Flames; Worcester IceCats; SEL; Malmö Redhawks DEL; Hannover Scorpions; Füchse Duisburg; Serie A Asiago HC; Milano Vipers; EBEL; Alba Volán Székesfehérvár; CHL; Arizona Sundogs; Missouri Mavericks; Kazakh; Arystan Temirtau
- National team: Hungary
- NHL draft: 116th overall, 2000; Calgary Flames
- Playing career: 1996–2012

Levente Szuper (born June 11, 1980) is a Hungarian former professional ice hockey goaltender. He was drafted 116th overall by the Calgary Flames in the 2000 NHL entry draft. He was the number one goalie of the Hungarian team which won promotion to the 2009 World championship. He is currently the general manager of Schiller-Vasas HC of the Erste Liga.

== Career ==
=== Early years ===
Szuper began playing hockey in Hungary at an early age, but also showed a flair for the arts. He became an accomplished actor and pianist, but it was between the pipes that he began to achieve prominence. He starred with Ferencvárosi TC as a 16-year-old and led the team a championship. He moved on to the junior team of the Krefeld Pinguine for the 1997–98 season, and had a stellar performance in the 1998 Pool C World Championships.

=== Moving to North America ===
Despite his success in Europe, Szuper was pretty unknown when he broke into the Ontario Hockey League in 1998 with the Ottawa 67s. But over the course of the 1998–99 season, Szuper excelled in the net, although he split his time there with Seamus Kotyk. The 67s advanced to the 1999 Memorial Cup as the host team, then defeated the Belleville Bulls in the semifinals to advance to the Memorial Cup championship against the Calgary Hitmen. Ottawa prevailed 7–6 in overtime, and Szuper won the F. W. "Dinty" Moore Trophy as the best rookie goalie of the year.

Szuper wasn't picked in the 1999 NHL entry draft, so he returned to Ottawa and continued to star. He was then drafted by the Calgary Flames in the 2000 NHL entry draft in the 4th round (#116 overall). Szuper would play the next three seasons with the Saint John Flames of the American Hockey League, earning a Calder Cup championship for the 2000–01 season.

During the 2002–03 season, Szuper was called up to the NHL with Calgary due to an injury of starting netminder Roman Turek. Szuper dressed for 9 games as the backup for Jamie McLennan, but never played. He is the first Hungarian native to appear on an active NHL roster for a game, but does not appear in the NHL register since he wasn't given any icetime.

After failing to stay with Calgary after the 2002–03 season, Szuper was picked by the St. Louis Blues and played in the 2003–04 season in their ECHL affiliate, the Peoria Rivermen.

=== Return to Europe ===
After the year in Peoria, Szuper tried to find a team in Europe for the lockout season of 2004. He had a trial with the Eisbären Berlin, but suffered an injury which demolished his chances of getting a contract. He played for Dunaújváros in the Hungarian league and then signed for Asiago HC of the Italian Serie A for the 2005-06 season.

Having played most of the next campaign with the Füchse Duisburg of the DEL, Szuper was signed by Malmö Redhawks for the 2007 Kvalserien (the relegation-round playoffs of the Swedish Elitserien). In the autumn he returned to Italy, this time with the Milano Vipers.

After the success of the national team in the 2008 Division I tournament in Sapporo he signed with Alba Volán Székesfehérvár, the most successful Hungarian team in recent times, which competes in the Austrian premier division. On June 29 he announced his move back to the DEL with the Hannover Scorpions.

=== Second stint playing in North America ===
On November 4, 2010, Szuper signed with the Arizona Sundogs of the American Central Hockey League. In his first season with the club, he set franchise records in games played (41), minutes (2,342), saves (1,240) and wins (18). In the following year Szuper was traded to the Missouri Mavericks in exchange for Steve Kaunisto and Nathan O'Nabigon.

=== Szuper leaves Mavericks to play in Kazakhstan ===
On January 13, 2012, after playing only one game for the Mavericks, Szuper left the team to sign with the Kazakh team Arystan Temirtau of the Kazakhstan Senior League on January 15, 2012. Szuper was placed on Team Suspension by the Mavericks.

== Personal ==
Szuper lives in his hometown of Budapest. He likes to spend his spare time with his horses on his ranch just outside the city. As a child, he started acting, and also worked as a well known dubbing actor. Today, after the end of his own hockey career, he works as a co-commentator during the NHL season, the Stanley Cup playoffs, and the World Championships for Hungarian sports channel Aréna4.

His family name means "super" in Hungarian; due to this, his helmets usually include a modified Superman logo with a letter Z.
