= Blaine Down =

Canadian professional ice hockey player

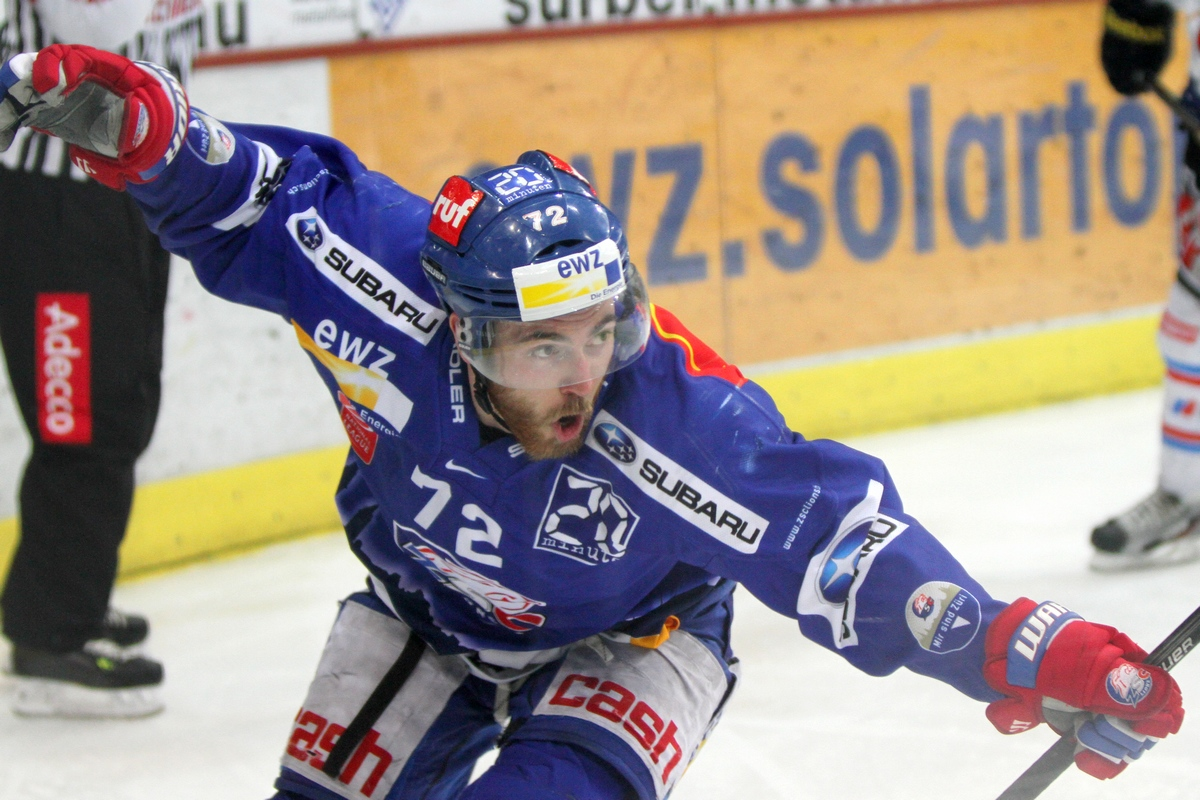
- Born: July 16, 1982 (age 44) Oshawa, Ontario, Canada
- Height: 5 ft 10 in (178 cm)
- Weight: 183 lb (83 kg; 13 st 1 lb)
- Position: Centre
- Shoots: Left
- EBEL team Former teams: EC VSV; Bridgeport Sound Tigers; Ritten-Renon; Herning IK; SC Langenthal; ZSC Lions; Straubing Tigers; Iserlohn Roosters
- NHL draft: Undrafted
- Playing career: 2002–present

Blaine Down (born July 16, 1982) is a Canadian professional ice hockey player. He is currently playing with EC VSV in the Austrian Hockey League (EBEL).

== Playing career ==
Down played major junior hockey with the Barrie Colts in the Ontario Hockey League (OHL) where he was active from 1999 to 2002, winning in 2000 the J. Ross Robertson Cup as OHL champions. He then played three years for the Bridgeport Sound Tigers of the American Hockey League (AHL), before joining Ritten Sport in Italy's Serie A in 2005. Then he played for two years in the Danish AL-Bank Ligaen with the Herning Blue Fox, helping the team win the 2007 and 2008 Danish championship. He signed with the ZSC Lions organization of the Swiss National League A starting with the 2008-09 season, also playing at Zurich's farm team, the GCK Lions of the National League B. He won the Champions Hockey League with the ZSC Lions in 2009. In four years, he saw the ice in 74 NLA and 87 NLB contests, capturing the Swiss national championship with the ZSC Lions in 2012.

On June 10, 2012, the Straubing Tigers of the Deutsche Eishockey Liga announced the signing of Down to a one-year contract. He would end up staying four years in Straubing, before being picked up by fellow DEL side Iserlohn Roosters prior to the 2016–17 season.

On May 19, 2018, Down left the DEL after 6 seasons to sign a one-year contract in the neighbouring EBEL with Austrian club, EC VSV.
