= Chris Stanley =

Canadian ice hockey player

- Born: June 18, 1979 (age 46) Parry Sound, Ontario, Canada
- Height: 6 ft 1 in (185 cm)
- Weight: 218 lb (99 kg; 15 st 8 lb)
- Position: Centre
- Shoots: Left
- 2.GBun team: Fischtown Pinguins
- NHL draft: 90th overall, 1997; Vancouver Canucks
- Playing career: 2001–present

Chris Stanley (born June 18, 1979) is a Canadian professional ice hockey player who last played with the Rostock Piranhas of the German Oberliga. He was selected by the Vancouver Canucks in the 4th round (90th overall) of the 1997 NHL entry draft. Stanley attended Brooklyn Technical High School in New York City.

== Awards and honours ==
Award	Year
CIS Player of the year	2003–04
