= 1998–99 OHL season =

Junior ice hockey season

The 1998–99 OHL season was the 19th season of the Ontario Hockey League. The Brampton Battalion and the Mississauga IceDogs were added as expansion teams. The league realigned from three divisions into two conferences and four divisions. Brampton were placed in the Midwest division of the Western conference, and Mississauga were placed in the Central division of the Eastern conference. The OHL inaugurated four new trophies this season. The Holody Trophy was created for the regular season champion of the Midwest division. Two conference playoffs champions were created; the Bobby Orr Trophy for the Eastern conference, and the Wayne Gretzky Trophy for the Western conference. The fourth new trophy was the Wayne Gretzky 99 Award, to be awarded to the MVP of the playoffs. Twenty teams each played sixty-eight games. The Belleville Bulls won the J. Ross Robertson Cup, defeating the London Knights.

== Expansion ==
=== Brampton Battalion ===
On December 3, 1996, the Brampton Battalion was granted an expansion franchise owned by Scott Abbott. The team began play in the 1998–99 season, playing in the Midwest Division of the Western Conference. The Battalion's arena was the newly constructed Brampton Centre.

Brampton played in their first game on September 24, 1998, losing 5–1 to the Peterborough Petes on the road. Their first home game was on October 9, as the Battalion dropped a 5-1 decision to the Kitchener Rangers in front of a sold-out crowd of 4,800 at the Brampton Centre. After beginning the season with six losses, Brampton won their first game, defeating the Sudbury Wolves 5–4 on October 18.

=== Mississauga IceDogs ===
On January 21, 1997, the Mississauga IceDogs was granted an expansion franchise which included former Boston Bruins head coach Don Cherry in their ownership group. The IceDogs began play in the 1998–99 season, playing in the Central Division of the Eastern Conference. The IceDogs arena was the newly constructed Hershey Centre.

The IceDogs played in their first game on September 25, 1998, losing a road game to the Kingston Frontenacs by a score of 10–0. Mississauga began the season with an 11-game road trip, as the club lost each game. In their home opener on October 30, Mississauga recorded their first win in franchise history, defeating the Toronto St. Michael's Majors 4–3 in front of a sold out of 6,000 fans at the Hershey Centre.

== Realignment ==
With the Brampton Battalion and Mississauga IceDogs joining the Ontario Hockey League for the 1998–99 season, the league underwent a massive realignment in which two new conferences, the Eastern Conference and Western Conference, were created. Within each conference was two five-team divisions. The playoff format changed that the top eight teams in each conference made the post-season.

=== Eastern Conference ===
==== East Division ====
The East Division consisted of five teams that played in the division during the 1997-98 season. The teams were the Belleville Bulls, Kingston Frontenacs, Oshawa Generals, Ottawa 67's, and Peterborough Petes. The Toronto St. Michael's Majors left the division, joining the Central Division.

==== Central Division ====
The Central Division underwent some major changes following the 1997-98 division. The Barrie Colts, North Bay Centennials and Sudbury Wolves remained in the division, however, the Guelph Storm, Kitchener Rangers, and Owen Sound Platers all left the division, joining the newly formed Midwest Division in the Western Conference. Joining the Central were the Toronto St. Michael's Majors from the East Division, and the expansion Mississauga IceDogs.

=== Western Conference ===
==== Midwest Division ====
The Midwest Division was a newly created division in the Western Conference. Joining the division were the Guelph Storm, Kitchener Rangers and Owen Sound Platers from the Central Division, while the Erie Otters joined from the West Division. The expansion Brampton Battalion also joined the division.

==== West Division ====
The West Division consisted of five teams that played in the division during the 1997-98 season. The teams were the London Knights, Plymouth Whalers, Sarnia Sting, Sault Ste. Marie Greyhounds and Windsor Spitfires. The Erie Otters left the division, joining the newly formed Midwest Division.

== New Arena ==
=== Sarnia Sports & Entertainment Centre ===
The Sarnia Sting moved from the Sarnia Arena to their new home, the Sarnia Sports & Entertainment Centre. The Sting defeated the Kitchener Rangers 5–2 in their first game at their new home on September 25, 1998, in front of a sold-out crowd of 4,635 fans.

== Regular season ==
=== Final standings ===
Note: DIV = Division; GP = Games played; W = Wins; L = Losses; T = Ties; OTL = Overtime losses; GF = Goals for; GA = Goals against; PTS = Points; x = clinched playoff berth; y = clinched division title; z = clinched conference title

=== Eastern conference ===
Rank	Team	DIV	GP	W	L	T	PTS	GF	GA
1	z-Barrie Colts	Central	68	49	13	6	105	343	192
2	y-Ottawa 67's	East	68	48	13	7	103	305	164
3	x-Belleville Bulls	East	68	39	22	7	85	334	246
4	x-Oshawa Generals	East	68	39	24	5	83	280	217
5	x-Peterborough Petes	East	68	40	26	2	82	266	213
6	x-Sudbury Wolves	Central	68	25	35	8	58	261	288
7	x-North Bay Centennials	Central	68	22	40	6	50	215	248
8	x-Kingston Frontenacs	East	68	22	42	4	48	240	320
9	Toronto St. Michael's Majors	Central	68	20	42	6	46	214	316
10	Mississauga IceDogs	Central	68	4	61	3	11	145	426

=== Western conference ===
Rank	Team	DIV	GP	W	L	T	PTS	GF	GA
1	z-Plymouth Whalers	West	68	51	13	4	106	313	162
2	x-Guelph Storm	Midwest	68	44	22	2	90	300	218
3	x-Owen Sound Platers	Midwest	68	39	24	5	83	312	293
4	x-Sarnia Sting	West	68	37	25	6	80	279	216
5	x-London Knights	West	68	34	30	4	72	260	217
6	x-Sault Ste. Marie Greyhounds	West	68	31	29	8	70	244	242
7	x-Erie Otters	Midwest	68	31	33	4	66	271	297
8	x-Windsor Spitfires	West	68	23	39	6	52	203	294
9	Kitchener Rangers	Midwest	68	23	39	6	52	205	257
10	Brampton Battalion	Midwest	68	8	57	3	19	198	362

=== Scoring leaders ===
Note: GP = Games played; G = Goals; A = Assists; Pts = Points; PIM = Penalty minutes

Player	Team	GP	G	A	Pts	PIM
Peter Sarno	Sarnia Sting	68	37	93	130	49
Norm Milley	Sudbury Wolves	68	52	68	120	47
Sheldon Keefe	Toronto/Barrie	66	51	65	116	140
Adam Colagiacomo	Plymouth Whalers	67	40	68	108	89
Mike Fisher	Sudbury Wolves	68	41	65	106	55
Daniel Tkaczuk	Barrie Colts	58	43	62	105	58
Harold Druken	Plymouth Whalers	60	58	45	103	34
Kevin Colley	Oshawa Generals	63	39	62	101	68
Justin Papineau	Belleville Bulls	68	52	47	99	28
Ivan Novoseltsev	Sarnia Sting	68	57	39	96	45

=== Leading goaltenders ===
Note: GP = Games played; Mins = Minutes played; W = Wins; L = Losses: OTL = Overtime losses;
SL = Shootout losses; GA = Goals Allowed; SO = Shutouts; GAA = Goals against average

Player	Team	GP	Mins	W	L	T	GA	SO	Sv%	GAA
Robert Holsinger	Plymouth Whalers	40	2252	28	10	0	78	5	0.924	2.08
Levente Szuper	Ottawa 67's	32	1801	22	6	3	70	4	0.920	2.33
Seamus Kotyk	Ottawa 67's	41	2314	26	7	4	92	5	0.915	2.39
Brian Finley	Barrie Colts	52	3064	36	10	4	136	3	0.920	2.66
Rob Zepp	Plymouth Whalers	31	1663	19	3	4	76	3	0.907	2.74

== Playoffs ==
Conference quarterfinals
E1	Barrie	4
E8	Kingston	1
E4	Oshawa	4
E5	Peterborough	1
E3	Belleville	4
E6	Sudbury	0
E2	Ottawa	4
E7	North Bay	0
W1	Plymouth	4
W8	Windsor	0
W4	Sarnia	2
W5	London	4
W3	Owen Sound	4
W6	S.S. Marie	1
W2	Guelph	4
W7	Erie	1

Conference semifinals
E1	Barrie	3
E4	Oshawa	4
E3	Belleville	4
E2	Ottawa	1
W1	Plymouth	3
W5	London	4
W3	Owen Sound	4
W2	Guelph	2

Conference finals
E4	Oshawa	1
E3	Belleville	4
W5	London	4
W3	Owen Sound	1

Finals
E3	Belleville	4
W5	London	3

=== Conference quarterfinals ===
==== Eastern conference quarterfinals ====
===== (1) Barrie Colts vs. (8) Kingston Frontenacs =====
March 21	Kingston Frontenacs	2 – 5	Barrie Colts	Barrie Molson Centre	Recap
No scoring		First period	0:19 - Denis Shvidki (1); 10:13 - Daniel Tkaczuk (1); 12:11 - Jeff Tetzlaff (1)
No scoring		Second period	No scoring
Adam Ianiero (1) - 12:34; Matt Elich (1) - 17:10		Third period	2:50 - Martin Skoula (1); 19:52 - en - Daniel Tkaczuk (2)
Patrick DesRochers (0 – 1, 36 saves / 40 shots)		Goalie stats	Brian Finley (1 – 0, 27 saves / 29 shots)

March 23	Barrie Colts	4 – 3	Kingston Frontenacs	Kingston Memorial Centre	Recap
Sheldon Keefe (1) - 11:27; Mike Christian (1) - 12:29		First period	No scoring
Andre Lakos (1) - 13:23		Second period	12:18 - Andrew Ianiero (2)
Nick Smith (1) - 18:18		Third period	0:37 - pp - Brett Cloutier (1); 7:08 - Andrew Ianiero (3)
Brian Finley (2 – 0, 47 saves / 50 shots)		Goalie stats	Patrick DesRochers (0 – 2, 42 saves / 46 shots)

March 24	Barrie Colts	3 – 4	2OT	Kingston Frontenacs	Kingston Memorial Centre	Recap
Denis Shvidki (2) - pp - 7:02		First period		12:40 - pp - Andrew Ianiero (4); 16:50 - pp - Kevin Grimes (1)
Andrew Lakos (2) - 15:21; Ryan Barnes (1) - 17:28		Second period		No scoring
No scoring		Third period		18:15 - Matt Elich (2)
No scoring		Second overtime period		3:41 - Andrew Ianiero (5)
Brian Finley (2 – 1, 35 saves / 39 shots)		Goalie stats		Patrick DesRochers (1 – 2, 59 saves / 62 shots)

March 26	Kingston Frontenacs	2 – 5	Barrie Colts	Barrie Molson Centre	Recap
Jonathan Schill (1) - 12:24		First period	1:41 - sh - Scott Cameron (1)
No scoring		Second period	3:02 - Nick Smith (2); 11:58 - Jerry Connell (1)
Kevin Grimes (2) - 10:29		Third period	3:36 - Mike Jefferson (1); 4:31 - Daniel Tkaczuk (3)
Patrick DesRochers (1 – 3, 41 saves / 46 shots)		Goalie stats	Brian Finley (3 – 1, 30 saves / 32 shots)

March 28	Kingston Frontenacs	4 – 6	Barrie Colts	Barrie Molson Centre	Recap
Michael Zigomanis (1) - 4:42		First period	No scoring
Matt Elich (3) - 7:27; Jonathan Schill (2) - 8:37		Second period	3:40 - Tim Verbeek (1); 7:02 - Scott Cameron (2); 17:59 - Joel Dezainde (1)
Sean Avery (1) - pp - 2:09		Third period	6:29 - pp - Martin Skoula (2); 16:26 - Sheldon Keefe (2); 19:17 - en - Daniel Tkaczuk (4)
Patrick DesRochers (1 – 4, 50 saves / 55 shots)		Goalie stats	Brian Finley (4 – 1, 27 saves / 31 shots)

Barrie wins series 4 – 1

===== (2) Ottawa 67's vs. (7) North Bay Centennials =====
March 21	North Bay Centennials	1 – 4	Ottawa 67's	Ottawa Civic Centre	Recap
Lorne Misita (1) - 10:28		First period	17:55 - Brian Campbell (1)
No scoring		Second period	1:06 - Mark Bell (1); 10:09 - Jeremy Van Hoof (1); 19:37 - Jonathan Zion (1)
No scoring		Third period	No scoring
Alex Auld (0 – 1, 43 saves / 47 shots)		Goalie stats	Seamus Kotyk (1 – 0, 17 saves / 18 shots)

March 23	North Bay Centennials	1 – 3	Ottawa 67's	Ottawa Civic Centre	Recap
No scoring		First period	5:58 - Justin Davis (1)
No scoring		Second period	5:17 - pp - Justin Davis (2)
Brett Gibson (1) - 12:32		Third period	4:44 - Matt Zultek (1)
Shawn Degagne (0 – 1, 48 saves / 51 shots)		Goalie stats	Seamus Kotyk (2 – 0, 22 saves / 23 shots)

March 26	Ottawa 67's	3 – 0	North Bay Centennials	North Bay Memorial Gardens	Recap
No scoring		First period	No scoring
Dan Tudin (1) - 8:48		Second period	No scoring
Ben Gustavson (1) - 15:37; Matt Zultek (2) - en - 18:50		Third period	No scoring
Levente Szuper (1 – 0, 31 saves / 31 shots)		Goalie stats	Alex Auld (0 – 2, 39 saves / 41 shots)

March 28	Ottawa 67's	4 – 1	North Bay Centennials	North Bay Memorial Gardens	Recap
Matt Zultek (3) - pp - 4:55; Miguel Delisle (1) - 13:59		First period	No scoring
Mark Bell (2) - 0:56		Second period	No scoring
Ben Gustavson (2) - 6:36		Third period	19:43 - Chris Neil (1)
Levente Szuper (2 – 0, 29 saves / 30 shots)		Goalie stats	Alex Auld (0 – 3, 23 saves / 27 shots); Shawn Degagne (3 saves / 3 shots)

Ottawa wins series 4 – 0

===== (3) Belleville Bulls vs. (6) Sudbury Wolves =====
March 20	Sudbury Wolves	2 – 7	Belleville Bulls	Yardmen Arena	Recap
No scoring		First period	3:13 - pp - Kevin Baker (1)
Brad Morgan (1) - pp - 4:34		Second period	0:34 - Ryan Ready (1); 7:23 - pp - Jason Lawmaster (1); 16:06 - Kevin Baker (2); 17:32 - pp - Jason Lawmaster (2)
Tom Kotsopoulos (1) - 15:02		Third period	3:33 - Kevin Baker (3); 7:47 - pp - Branko Radivojevic (1)
Mike Gorman (0 – 1, 54 saves / 61 shots)		Goalie stats	Cory Campbell (1 – 0, 27 saves / 29 shots)

March 21	Sudbury Wolves	3 – 8	Belleville Bulls	Yardmen Arena	Recap
Derek MacKenzie (1) - 15:38		First period	9:50 - sh - Randy Rowe (1); 19:59 - Jason Lawmaster (3)
Jason Jaspers (1) - 13:08		Second period	11:42 - pp - Jonathan Cheechoo (1); 12:33 - Jonathan Cheechoo (2); 13:40 - pp - Kevin Baker (4)
Mike Fisher (1) - pp - 7:16		Third period	2:40 - pp - Ryan Ready (2); 8:06 - Kevin Baker (5); 12:17 - Randy Rowe (2)
Andrew Raycroft (0 – 1, 15 saves / 19 shots); Mike Gorman (25 saves / 29 shots)		Goalie stats	Cory Campbell (2 – 0, 29 saves / 32 shots)

March 23	Belleville Bulls	8 – 2	Sudbury Wolves	Sudbury Community Arena	Recap
Glenn Crawford (1) - 12:55		First period	No scoring
Justin Papineau (1) - 10:58; Justin Papineau (2) - 16:13		Second period	No scoring
Glenn Crawford (2) - 1:45; Randy Rowe (3) - 14:08; Jonathan Cheechoo (3) - 15:55; Mark Chaplin (1) - 16:33; Glenn Crawford (3) - pp - 17:43		Third period	0:52 - Brad Morgan (2); 8:37 - pp - Brad Morgan (3)
Cory Campbell (3 – 0, 64 saves / 66 shots)		Goalie stats	Mike Gorman (0 – 2, 57 saves / 64 shots); Andrew Raycroft (3 saves / 4 shots)

March 25	Belleville Bulls	8 – 5	Sudbury Wolves	Sudbury Community Arena	Recap
Jonathan Cheechoo (4) - 2:26; Kris Newbury (1) - 2:48; Glenn Crawford (4) - 7:59; Nathan Robinson (1) - 8:24		First period	9:05 - Mike Fisher (1); 11:05 - Norm Milley (1)
Mark Chaplin (2) - 4:57; Glenn Crawford (5) - 6:21; Justin Papineau (3) - pp - 19:51		Second period	14:01 - Norm Milley (2); 19:37 - sh - Jason Jaspers (2)
Ryan Ready (3) - 7:55		Third period	8:04 - Derek MacKenzie (2)
Chad Mehlenbacher (3 saves / 5 shots); Cory Campbell (4 – 0, 33 saves / 36 shots)		Goalie stats	Andrew Raycroft (0 – 2, 51 saves / 59 shots)

Belleville wins series 4 – 0

===== (4) Oshawa Generals vs. (5) Peterborough Petes =====
March 21	Peterborough Petes	1 – 2	Oshawa Generals	Oshawa Civic Auditorium	Recap
No scoring		First period	3:37 - pp - Jim Baxter (1); 14:10 - pp - Brad Ralph (1)
Scott Barney (1) - pp - 7:22		Second period	No scoring
No scoring		Third period	No scoring
Mike Pickard (0 – 1, 44 saves / 46 shots)		Goalie stats	Tyrone Garner (1 – 0, 28 saves / 29 shots)

March 23	Oshawa Generals	2 – 4	Peterborough Petes	Peterborough Memorial Centre	Recap
No scoring		First period	No scoring
Brent Gauvreau (1) - pp - 12:40; John Kozoriz (1) - 14:43		Second period	4:23 - Preston Mizzi (1); 5:29 - Jason Williams (1)
No scoring		Third period	1:05 - pp - Scott Barney (2); 12:54 - Scott Barney (3)
Tyrone Garner (1 – 1, 39 saves / 43 shots)		Goalie stats	Mike Pickard (1 – 1, 31 saves / 33 shots)

March 24	Peterborough Petes	5 – 6	Oshawa Generals	Oshawa Civic Auditorium	Recap
Preston Mizzi (2) - pp - 11:24; John Brioux (1) - pp - 16:31; John Brioux (2) - pp - 17:10		First period	3:58 - Jeff MacMillan (1)
No scoring		Second period	13:04 - pp - Derrell Upton (1); 13:23 - pp - Brent Gauvreau (2)
Scott Barney (4) - pp - 2:28; Sergei Kuznetzov (1) - 8:42		Third period	6:58 - Kevin Colley (1); 11:36 - Brad Ralph (2); 12:36 - pp - Brad Ralph (3)
Joey MacDonald (0 – 1, 47 saves / 53 shots)		Goalie stats	Tyrone Garner (2 – 1, 33 saves / 38 shots)

March 25	Oshawa Generals	5 – 2	Peterborough Petes	Peterborough Memorial Centre	Recap
Brandon Coalter (1) - 1:07		First period	No scoring
Brad Ralph (4) - pp - 6:57; Derrell Upton (2) - pp - 7:48; Kevin Colley (2) - sh - 10:48		Second period	3:51 - Sergei Kuznetzov (2); 17:06 - Derek McNamara (1)
Jeff MacMillan (2) - 1:50		Third period	No scoring
Tyrone Garner (3 – 1, 39 saves / 41 shots)		Goalie stats	Joey MacDonald (0 – 2, 29 saves / 34 shots)

March 28	Peterborough Petes	1 – 9	Oshawa Generals	Oshawa Civic Auditorium	Recap
Brad Self (1) - pp - 13:07		First period	2:25 - John Kozoriz (2); 16:07 - John Kozoriz (3)
No scoring		Second period	1:37 - Derrell Upton (3); 4:01 - Ilya Demidov (1); 7:50 - Brandon Coalter (2); 13:34 - pp - Kevin Colley (3); 16:12 - Brian Passmore (1); 19:17 - Richard Scott (1)
No scoring		Third period	14:00 - Brandon Cullen (1)
Mike Pickard (1 – 2, 26 saves / 33 shots); Joey MacDonald (12 saves / 14 shots)		Goalie stats	Tyrone Garner (4 – 1, 35 saves / 36 shots)

Oshawa wins series 4 – 1

==== Western conference quarterfinals ====
===== (1) Plymouth Whalers vs. (8) Windsor Spitfires =====
March 21	Windsor Spitfires	1 – 9	Plymouth Whalers	Compuware Sports Arena	Recap
No scoring		First period	5:33 - Nikos Tselios (1); 17:52 - Harold Druken (1)
Michael Hanson (1) - 3:06		Second period	2:28 - Damian Surma (1); 14:03 - Adam Colagiacomo (1); 18:58 - pp - Harold Druken (2)
No scoring		Third period	2:17 - Harold Druken (3); 5:04 - Adam Colagiacomo (2); 9:23 - Jared Newman (1); 15:46 - pp - Eric Gooldy (1)
Michael Leighton (0 – 1, 63 saves / 72 shots)		Goalie stats	Robert Holsinger (1 – 0, 19 saves / 20 shots)

March 23	Plymouth Whalers	6 – 0	Windsor Spitfires	Windsor Arena	Recap
Shaun Fisher (1) - 4:52; Nikos Tselios (2) - pp - 5:38		First period	No scoring
Adam Colagiacomo (3) - pp - 10:55; David Legwand (1) - sh - 15:00; Troy Smith (1) - 16:37		Second period	No scoring
Nikos Tselios (3) - 4:25		Third period	No scoring
Robert Holsinger (2 – 0, 13 saves / 13 shots)		Goalie stats	Ron Vogel (0 – 1, 31 saves / 36 shots); Michael Leighton (13 saves / 14 shots)

March 25	Plymouth Whalers	4 – 3	Windsor Spitfires	Windsor Arena	Recap
No scoring		First period	8:50 - pp - Michael Hanson (2)
Randy Fitzgerald (1) - pp - 4:56; Harold Druken (4) - 19:36		Second period	11:20 - Michael Hanson (3)
Troy Smith (2) - 8:44; Jason Ward (1) - 10:55		Third period	11:34 - Jeff Martin (1)
Rob Zepp (1 – 0, 26 saves / 29 shots)		Goalie stats	Ron Vogel (0 – 2, 44 saves / 48 shots)

March 26	Windsor Spitfires	2 – 8	Plymouth Whalers	Compuware Sports Arena	Recap
No scoring		First period	2:09 - pp - Paul Mara (1); 10:20 - Troy Smith (3)
Michael Hanson (4) - pp - 12:32		Second period	5:41 - Randy Fitzgerald (2); 9:02 - Harold Druken (5); 13:47 - James Ramsay (1)
Jeff Martin (2) - 14:25		Third period	2:31 - Damian Surma (2); 11:01 - Harold Druken (6); 16:45 - Justin Williams (1)
Ron Vogel (0 – 3, 29 saves / 37 shots); Michael Leighton (0 saves / 0 shots)		Goalie stats	Robert Holsinger (3 – 0, 17 saves / 19 shots)

Plymouth wins series 4 – 0

===== (2) Guelph Storm vs. (7) Erie Otters =====
March 22	Erie Otters	0 – 1	OT	Guelph Storm	Guelph Memorial Gardens	Recap
No scoring		First period		No scoring
No scoring		Second period		No scoring
No scoring		Third period		No scoring
No scoring		First overtime period		5:00 - Brent Kelly (1)
J.F. Perras (0 – 1, 42 saves / 43 shots)		Goalie stats		Chris Madden (1 – 0, 33 saves / 33 shots)

March 23	Erie Otters	4 – 6	Guelph Storm	Guelph Memorial Gardens	Recap
Nikita Alexeev (1) - 2:07		First period	3:55 - pp - Bob Crummer (1); 11:06 - pp - Eric Beaudoin (1)
Arvid Rekis (1) - pp - 9:10		Second period	0:40 - Ryan Davis (1); 12:38 - Darryl Knight (1); 19:32 - Darryl McArthur (1)
Julius Halfkenny (1) - 7:13; Andrew Proskurnicki (1) - pp - 13:42		Third period	13:57 - Bohuslav Subr (1)
J.F. Perras (0 – 2, 45 saves / 51 shots)		Goalie stats	Chris Madden (2 – 0, 38 saves / 42 shots)

March 26	Guelph Storm	4 – 3	Erie Otters	Erie Civic Center	Recap
Lindsay Plunkett (1) - pp - 8:22		First period	6:32 - Tyler Rennette (1); 16:13 - Tyler Rennette (2)
Joe Gerbe (1) - 12:04		Second period	8:28 - pp - Tyler Rennette (3)
Brent Kelly (2) - sh - 4:18; Kevin Mitchell (1) - 11:16		Third period	No scoring
Chris Madden (3 – 0, 31 saves / 34 shots)		Goalie stats	Corey Batten (0 – 1, 33 saves / 37 shots); J.F. Perras (0 saves / 0 shots)

March 27	Guelph Storm	1 – 5	Erie Otters	Erie Civic Center	Recap
Lindsay Plunkett (2) - pp - 19:10		First period	12:31 - Andrew Proskurnicki (2); 17:12 - Brad Boyes (1)
No scoring		Second period	0:09 - Tyler Rennette (4); 0:21 - Paul Harvey (1); 11:14 - pp - Tyler Rennette (5)
No scoring		Third period	No scoring
Chris Madden (3 – 1, 23 saves / 28 shots); Craig Anderson (0 saves / 0 shots)		Goalie stats	J.F. Perras (1 – 2, 35 saves / 36 shots)

March 29	Erie Otters	2 – 3	Guelph Storm	Guelph Memorial Gardens	Recap
Brad Yeo (1) - 10:59		First period	17:29 - pp - Bob Crummer (2)
Tyler Rennette (6) - pp - 2:38		Second period	5:03 - pp - Bob Crummer (3)
No scoring		Third period	13:50 - Eric Beaudoin (2)
J.F. Perras (1 – 3, 42 saves / 45 shots); Corey Batten (1 save / 1 shot)		Goalie stats	Chris Madden (4 – 1, 31 saves / 33 shots)

Guelph wins series 4 – 1

===== (3) Owen Sound Platers vs. (6) Sault Ste. Marie Greyhounds =====
March 21	Sault Ste. Marie Greyhounds	5 – 10	Owen Sound Platers	Bayshore Community Centre	Recap
No scoring		First period	4:11 - pp - Wes Goldie (1); 5:47 - sh - Dan Snyder (1); 15:42 - Aaron Fransen (1)
Daniel Passero (1) - 8:43; Chad Cavanagh (1) - pp - 15:49		Second period	4:12 - Dave Stephenson (1); 5:48 - Nick Vukovic (1); 6:20 - Adam Mair (1); 16:13 - Peter Campbell (1); 18:18 - Jan Sulc (1)
Paul Ballantyne (1) - 5:38; Cory Pecker (1) - 13:16; Chad Cavanagh (2) - 13:48		Third period	5:27 - pp - Adam Mair (2); 17:21 - pp - Mike Lankshear (1)
Jake McCracken (0 – 1, 35 saves / 42 shots); Jeremy Elliott (6 saves / 9 shots)		Goalie stats	Curtis Sanford (1 – 0, 36 saves / 41 shots)

March 22	Sault Ste. Marie Greyhounds	2 – 3	Owen Sound Platers	Bayshore Community Centre	Recap
Chad Spurr (1) - pp - 15:41		First period	19:13 - pp - Mike Dombkiewicz (1)
No scoring		Second period	6:48 - pp - Chad Woollard (1); 15:05 - pp - Aaron Fransen (2)
Josef Vasicek (1) - 12:45		Third period	No scoring
Jason Flick (0 – 1, 25 saves / 28 shots)		Goalie stats	Curtis Sanford (2 – 0, 37 saves / 39 shots)

March 25	Owen Sound Platers	2 – 6	Sault Ste. Marie Greyhounds	Sault Memorial Gardens	Recap
Wes Goldie (2) - pp - 11:31		First period	No scoring
Joel Ward (1) - 0:26		Second period	6:37 - Chad Cavanagh (3); 8:15 - Chad Spurr (2); 14:23 - pp - Chad Cavanagh (4); 15:38 - Shawn Snider (1); 16:05 - Josef Vasicek (2); 17:11 - Adam Nittel (1)
No scoring		Third period	No scoring
Curtis Sanford (2 – 1, 41 saves / 47 shots)		Goalie stats	Jason Flick (1 – 1, 27 saves / 29 shots)

March 26	Owen Sound Platers	3 – 2	Sault Ste. Marie Greyhounds	Sault Memorial Gardens	Recap
No scoring		First period	No scoring
Aaron Fransen (3) - pp - 9:04; Dan Snyder (2) - pp - 17:17		Second period	No scoring
Peter Campbell (2) - 17:49		Third period	8:43 - pp - Josef Vasicek (3); 15:04 - pp - Chad Spurr (3)
Curtis Sanford (3 – 1, 41 saves / 43 shots)		Goalie stats	Jason Flick (1 – 2, 33 saves / 36 shots)

March 28	Sault Ste. Marie Greyhounds	4 – 6	Owen Sound Platers	Bayshore Community Centre	Recap
No scoring		First period	8:51 - pp - Adam Mair (3)
No scoring		Second period	19:45 - pp - Dan Snyder (3)
Tim Zafiris (1) - 9:21; Chad Spurr (4) - pp - 14:40; Chad Cavanagh (5) - pp - 15:03; Tim Zafiris (2) - 16:39		Third period	2:49 - pp - Wes Goldie (3); 7:10 - pp - Dan Snyder (4); 18:22 - Adam Mair (4); 19:34 - en - Dan Snyder (5)
Jason Flick (1 – 3, 35 saves / 40 shots)		Goalie stats	Curtis Sanford (4 – 1, 26 saves / 30 shots)

Owen Sound wins series 4 – 1

===== (4) Sarnia Sting vs. (5) London Knights =====
March 21	London Knights	3 – 6	Sarnia Sting	Sarnia Sports & Entertainment Centre	Recap
No scoring		First period	2:25 - Kevin Malcolm (1); 5:53 - pp - Kevin Malcolm (2)
No scoring		Second period	12:29 - Robb Palahnuk (1); 13:41 - pp - Ivan Novoseltsev (1); 19:07 - pp - Jeff Heerema (1)
Chris Kelly (1) - 4:05; John Erskine (1) - 9:55; Richard Pitirri (1) - 16:27		Third period	19:32 - en - Ivan Novoseltsev (2)
Gene Chiarello (0 – 1, 25 saves / 30 shots)		Goalie stats	Curtis Cruickshank (1 – 0, 23 saves / 26 shots)

March 23	Sarnia Sting	4 – 5	London Knights	London Ice House	Recap
Jeff Heerema (2) - pp - 8:49; Peter Sarno (1) - pp - 13:54		First period	2:41 - pp - Richard Pitirri (2); 7:50 - pp - Chris Kelly (2); 10:59 - Alex Henry (1)
No scoring		Second period	2:57 - John Erskine (2); 19:23 - pp - John Erskine (3)
David Cornacchia (1) - 11:44; Peter Cava (1) - 16:52		Third period	No scoring
Curtis Cruickshank (7 saves / 10 shots); Greg Hewitt (0 – 1, 33 saves / 35 shots)		Goalie stats	Gene Chiarello (1 – 1, 34 saves / 38 shots)

March 25	London Knights	2 – 3	2OT	Sarnia Sting	Sarnia Sports & Entertainment Centre	Recap
Tom Kostopoulos (1) - sh - 5:57		First period		13:13 - pp - Greg Willers (1)
No scoring		Second period		12:01 - Jeff Heerema (3)
Richard Pitirri (3) - 18:36		Third period		No scoring
No scoring		Second overtime period		10:36 - Jeff Zehr (1)
Gene Chiarello (1 – 2, 48 saves / 51 shots)		Goalie stats		Greg Hewitt (1 – 1, 62 saves / 64 shots)

March 26	Sarnia Sting	3 – 4	OT	London Knights	London Ice House	Recap
Jeff Zehr (2) - 8:53		First period		No scoring
Dusty Jamieson (1) - 6:37; Ryan VanBuskirk (1) - 14:19		Second period		No scoring
No scoring		Third period		6:53 - Chris Kelly (3); 8:42 - Jay Legault (1); 15:59 - pp - Tom Kostopoulos (2)
No scoring		First overtime period		3:35 - Rico Fata (1)
Greg Hewitt (1 – 2, 63 saves / 67 shots)		Goalie stats		Gene Chiarello (2 – 2, 35 saves / 38 shots)

March 28	London Knights	4 – 2	Sarnia Sting	Sarnia Sports & Entertainment Centre	Recap
Rico Fata (2) - 4:04; Richard Pitirri (4) - 12:53		First period	No scoring
Rico Fata (3) - 4:03; Jay Legault (2) - pp - 17:39		Second period	9:50 - pp - Jeff Zehr (3)
No scoring		Third period	4:28 - pp - Jeff Heerema (4)
Gene Chiarello (3 – 2, 40 saves / 42 shots)		Goalie stats	Greg Hewitt (1 – 3, 34 saves / 38 shots); Curtis Cruickshank (0 saves / 0 shots)

March 30	Sarnia Sting	1 – 4	London Knights	London Ice House	Recap
Jeff Heerema (5) - 7:49		First period	No scoring
No scoring		Second period	16:19 - pp - Krys Barch (1)
No scoring		Third period	3:22 - pp - Jason Doyle (1); 3:33 - Tom Kostopoulos (3); 18:08 - en - Alex Henry (2)
Greg Hewitt (1 – 4, 39 saves / 42 shots); Curtis Cruickshank (0 saves / 0 shots)		Goalie stats	Gene Chiarello (4 – 2, 30 saves / 31 shots)

London wins series 4 – 2

=== Conference semifinals ===
==== Eastern conference semifinals ====
===== (1) Barrie Colts vs. (4) Oshawa Generals =====
April 4	Oshawa Generals	5 – 4	Barrie Colts	Barrie Molson Centre	Recap
Drew Bucktooth (1) - 13:08		First period	1:09 - Mike Christian (2); 4:11 - pp - Mike Christian (3)
Brad Ralph (5) - pp - 7:43; Brian Passmore (2) - 11:52		Second period	14:16 - pp - Daniel Tkaczuk (5); 17:48 - pp - Ryan Barnes (2)
Kevin Colley (4) - 13:04; Kevin Colley (5) - 19:50		Third period	No scoring
Tyrone Garner (5 – 1, 38 saves / 42 shots)		Goalie stats	Ben Vanderklok (0 – 1, 26 saves / 31 shots)

April 6	Barrie Colts	5 – 2	Oshawa Generals	Oshawa Civic Auditorium	Recap
Andre Lakos (3) - 14:47; Denis Shvidki (3) - 19:33		First period	3:20 - Brent Gauvreau (3)
Mike Christian (4) - pp - 3:37		Second period	No scoring
Sheldon Keefe (3) - 4:19; Denis Shvidki (4) - 15:14		Third period	9:08 - pp - Brad Ralph (6)
Ben Vanderklok (1 – 1, 26 saves / 28 shots)		Goalie stats	Tyrone Garner (5 – 2, 42 saves / 47 shots)

April 8	Oshawa Generals	1 – 8	Barrie Colts	Barrie Molson Centre	Recap
Brent Gauvreau (4) - pp - 13:47		First period	11:18 - pp - Denis Shvidki (5); 11:41 - pp - Martin Skoula (3); 12:54 - pp - Sheldon Keefe (4)
No scoring		Second period	8:45 - pp - Denis Shvidki (6)
No scoring		Third period	6:32 - Tim Verbeek (2); 13:21 - pp - Sheldon Keefe (5); 15:51 - pp - Mike Jefferson (2); 19:27 - Tim Verbeek (3)
Tyrone Garner (5 – 3, 40 saves / 46 shots); Derek Dolson (3 saves / 5 shots)		Goalie stats	Ben Vanderklok (2 – 1, 19 saves / 20 shots)

April 9	Barrie Colts	4 – 1	Oshawa Generals	Oshawa Civic Auditorium	Recap
Mike Jefferson (3) - pp - 14:10		First period	11:26 - pp - Brent Gauvreau (5)
Denis Shvidki (7) - pp - 13:05		Second period	No scoring
Chris Feil (1) - 3:59; Daniel Tkaczuk (6) - 4:36		Third period	No scoring
Ben Vanderklok (3 – 1, 27 saves / 28 shots)		Goalie stats	Tyrone Garner (5 – 4, 42 saves / 46 shots)

April 11	Oshawa Generals	5 – 4	OT	Barrie Colts	Barrie Molson Centre	Recap
Brandon Cullen (2) - 5:36; Jim Baxter (2) - pp - 13:28		First period		15:53 - pp - Mike Jefferson (4)
Brian Passmore (3) - 10:40		Second period		18:52 - pp - Joel Dezainde (2); 19:05 - Daniel Tkaczuk (7)
Kevin Colley (6) - 17:20		Third period		11:35 - Nick Smith (3)
Jim Baxter (3) - 8:29		First overtime period		No scoring
Tyrone Garner (6 – 4, 48 saves / 52 shots)		Goalie stats		Ben Vanderklok (3 – 2, 34 saves / 39 shots)

April 13	Barrie Colts	2 – 4	Oshawa Generals	Oshawa Civic Auditorium	Recap
No scoring		First period	4:35 - pp - Brent Gauvreau (6); 15:12 - sh - Brad Ralph (7)
Mike Jefferson (5) - pp - 8:05; Shawn Cation (1) - pp - 11:19		Second period	1:54 - Andrew Peters (1); 8:18 - pp - Derrell Upton (4)
No scoring		Third period	No scoring
Ben Vanderklok (3 – 3, 38 saves / 42 shots)		Goalie stats	Tyrone Garner (7 – 4, 36 saves / 38 shots)

April 15	Oshawa Generals	5 – 3	Barrie Colts	Barrie Molson Centre	Recap
No scoring		First period	No scoring
Brent Gauvreau (7) - pp - 2:45; Brent Gauvreau (8) - 10:21; Kevin Colley (7) - pp - 15:20; Ilya Demidov (2) - 16:13		Second period	No scoring
Brian Passmore (4) - sh - 5:31		Third period	0:42 - Mike Christian (5); 11:22 - Tim Verbeek (4); 12:29 - Mike Jefferson (6)
Tyrone Garner (8 – 4, 33 saves / 36 shots)		Goalie stats	Ben Vanderklok (3 – 4, 23 saves / 28 shots)

Oshawa wins series 4 – 3

===== (2) Ottawa 67's vs. (3) Belleville Bulls =====
April 2	Belleville Bulls	5 – 6	2OT	Ottawa 67's	Ottawa Civic Centre	Recap
Kris Newbury (2) - 11:40		First period		3:39 - Mark Bell (3); 7:21 - pp - Matt Zultek (4)
Kevin Baker (6) - pp - 13:49; Glenn Crawford (6) - 16:10		Second period		18:53 - pp - Matt Zultek (5)
Ryan Ready (4) - 18:03; Kevin Baker (7) - 18:59		Third period		5:56 - Mark Bell (4); 8:30 - Joe Talbot (1)
No scoring		Second overtime period		16:00 - Mark Bell (5)
Cory Campbell (4 – 1, 51 saves / 57 shots)		Goalie stats		Seamus Kotyk (3 – 0, 45 saves / 50 shots)

April 3	Ottawa 67's	2 – 5	Belleville Bulls	Yardmen Arena	Recap
No scoring		First period	3:14 - Justin Papineau (4); 3:35 - Jason Lawmaster (4); 13:31 - Mike Renzi (1)
Jonathan Zion (2) - 13:28; Matt Zultek (6) - pp - 15:58		Second period	17:39 - Jonathan Cheechoo (5)
No scoring		Third period	10:38 - Derek Campbell (1)
Levente Szuper (2 – 1, 42 saves / 47 shots)		Goalie stats	Cory Campbell (5 – 1, 32 saves / 34 shots)

April 6	Belleville Bulls	3 – 1	Ottawa 67's	Ottawa Civic Centre	Recap
Kevin Baker (8) - pp - 19:00		First period	No scoring
Mike Renzi (2) - 14:01		Second period	19:52 - pp - Mark Bell (6)
Randy Rowe (4) - 17:34		Third period	No scoring
Cory Campbell (6 – 1, 37 saves / 38 shots)		Goalie stats	Seamus Kotyk (3 – 1, 23 saves / 26 shots)

April 7	Ottawa 67's	4 – 5	OT	Belleville Bulls	Yardmen Arena	Recap
Dan Tudin (2) - 13:28		First period		14:01 - Jason Lawmaster (5)
No scoring		Second period		5:21 - Branko Radivojevic (2)
Nick Boynton (1) - pp - 1:17; Joe Talbot (2) - 10:53; Ian Jacobs (1) - 11:07		Third period		9:49 - Ryan Ready (5); 19:52 - Kevin Baker (9)
No scoring		First overtime period		1:19 - Glenn Crawford (7)
Levente Szuper (2 – 2, 31 saves / 36 shots)		Goalie stats		Cory Campbell (7 – 1, 28 saves / 32 shots)

April 9	Belleville Bulls	3 – 2	OT	Ottawa 67's	Ottawa Civic Centre	Recap
No scoring		First period		No scoring
No scoring		Second period		11:34 - sh - Brian Campbell (2)
Randy Rowe (5) - 11:21; Ryan Ready (6) - pp - 15:42		Third period		1:16 - pp - Dan Tudin (3)
Ryan Ready (7) - 2:03		First overtime period		No scoring
Cory Campbell (8 – 1, 26 saves / 28 shots)		Goalie stats		Seamus Kotyk (3 – 2, 27 saves / 30 shots)

Belleville wins series 4 – 1

==== Western conference semifinals ====
===== (1) Plymouth Whalers vs. (5) London Knights =====
April 3	London Knights	3 – 2	OT	Plymouth Whalers	Compuware Sports Arena	Recap
Jason Doyle (2) - pp - 3:04; Richard Pitirri (5) - sh - 3:46		First period		7:13 - Harold Druken (7)
No scoring		Second period		6:58 - Adam Colagiacomo (4)
No scoring		Third period		No scoring
Krys Barch (2) - 0:34		First overtime period		No scoring
Gene Chiarello (5 – 2, 37 saves / 39 shots)		Goalie stats		Robert Holsinger (3 – 1, 27 saves / 30 shots)

April 5	Plymouth Whalers	2 – 3	OT	London Knights	London Ice House	Recap
No scoring		First period		0:44 - pp - Tom Kostopoulos (4); 8:27 - pp - Tom Kostopoulos (5)
Eric Gooldy (2) - pp - 12:01		Second period		No scoring
Damian Surma (3) - 14:06		Third period		No scoring
No scoring		First overtime period		0:53 - Tom Kostopoulos (6)
Robert Holsinger (3 – 2, 35 saves / 38 shots)		Goalie stats		Gene Chiarello (6 – 2, 41 saves / 43 shots)

April 7	London Knights	3 – 7	Plymouth Whalers	Compuware Sports Arena	Recap
No scoring		First period	12:23 - Randy Fitzgerald (3); 13:07 - Harold Druken (8)
Krys Barch (3) - 2:38; Joel Scherban (1) - 11:34		Second period	3:08 - Harold Druken (9); 5:33 - Julian Smith (1)
Richard Pitirri (6) - 5:22		Third period	16:39 - Adam Colagiacomo (5); 19:06 - en - Adam Colagiacomo (6); 19:41 - Jason Ward (2)
Gene Chiarello (6 – 3, 41 saves / 47 shots)		Goalie stats	Robert Holsinger (4 – 2, 25 saves / 28 shots)

April 9	Plymouth Whalers	5 – 4	OT	London Knights	London Ice House	Recap
Jason Ward (3) - pp - 14:21		First period		16:57 - Rico Fata (4)
Eric Gooldy (3) - 6:39; Julian Smith (2) - 7:09; David Legwand (2) - 18:56		Second period		1:55 - Tom Kostopoulos (7)
No scoring		Third period		5:25 - Jay Legault (3); 10:43 - Tom Kostopoulos (8)
Nikos Tselios (4) - pp - 6:05		First overtime period		No scoring
Robert Holsinger (5 – 2, 45 saves / 49 shots)		Goalie stats		Gene Chiarello (6 – 4, 43 saves / 48 shots)

April 10	London Knights	4 – 5	Plymouth Whalers	Compuware Sports Arena	Recap
Krys Barch (4) - 11:01		First period	8:24 - pp - Paul Mara (2); 8:48 - Jason Ward (4)
Krys Barch (5) - 4:35; Jason Doyle (3) - pp - 19:57		Second period	1:39 - Paul Mara (3); 3:32 - pp - David Legwand (3); 17:39 - pp - Jason Ward (5)
Rico Fata (5) - pp - 11:47		Third period	No scoring
Gene Chiarello (6 – 5, 41 saves / 46 shots)		Goalie stats	Robert Holsinger (6 – 2, 28 saves / 32 shots)

April 13	Plymouth Whalers	2 – 8	London Knights	London Ice House	Recap
No scoring		First period	3:08 - pp - Chris Kelly (4)
Paul Mara (4) - 8:37		Second period	3:58 - Jason Metcalfe (1); 5:45 - pp - Rico Fata (6); 14:50 - pp - John Erskine (4)
Tomek Valtonen (1) - 17:40		Third period	8:02 - pp - Mike Mazzuca (1); 9:55 - Tom Kostopoulos (9); 10:20 - Peter Reynolds (1); 16:12 - Mike Mazzuca (2)
Robert Holsinger (6 – 3, 22 saves / 26 shots); Rob Zepp (12 saves / 16 shots)		Goalie stats	Gene Chiarello (7 – 5, 24 saves / 26 shots)

April 15	London Knights	10 – 3	Plymouth Whalers	Compuware Sports Arena	Recap
Tom Kostopoulos (10) - 0:29; Jay Legault (4) - 5:18; Richard Pitirri (7) - 6:12		First period	1:07 - Paul Mara (5)
Krys Barch (6) - 1:23; Adam Saffer (1) - 3:32; Joel Scherban (2) - 9:53; Dan Jancevski (1) - 18:38		Second period	4:36 - Jamie Lalonde (1)
Richard Pitirri (8) - 1:53; Tom Kostopoulos (11) - 7:08; Rico Fata (7) - 14:44		Third period	4:01 - Jason Ward (6)
Gene Chiarello (8 – 5, 42 saves / 45 shots)		Goalie stats	Robert Holsinger (6 – 4, 24 saves / 31 shots); Rob Zepp (6 saves / 9 shots)

London wins series 4 – 3

===== (2) Guelph Storm vs. (3) Owen Sound Platers =====
April 1	Owen Sound Platers	5 – 6	Guelph Storm	Guelph Memorial Gardens	Recap
Peter Campbell (3) - pp - 4:10; Wes Goldie (4) - sh - 9:25; Jan Sulc (2) - 19:18		First period	12:14 - Brent Kelly (3)
Chad Woollard (2) - pp - 12:30		Second period	3:55 - pp - Bob Crummer (4); 9:43 - Kent McDonell (1)
Adam Campbell (1) - 2:17		Third period	1:33 - pp - Eric Beaudoin (3); 14:26 - Kevin Dallman (1); 16:47 - Kent McDonell (2)
Curtis Sanford (4 – 2, 35 saves / 41 shots)		Goalie stats	Chris Madden (5 – 1, 38 saves / 43 shots)

April 3	Guelph Storm	4 – 8	Owen Sound Platers	Bayshore Community Centre	Recap
No scoring		First period	2:58 - pp - Aaron Fransen (4); 5:54 - Mike Lankshear (2); 6:12 - Peter Campbell (4)
Kevin Mitchell (2) - 5:16; Joe Gerbe (2) - 15:01; Lindsay Plunkett (3) - 17:28		Second period	6:49 - Adam Campbell (2); 13:34 - Wes Goldie (5); 15:52 - Adam Mair (5)
Kevin Mitchell (3) - pp - 3:56		Third period	12:49 - pp - Peter Campbell (5); 13:45 - D. J. Maracle (1)
Chris Madden (6 saves / 9 shots); Craig Anderson (0 – 1, 32 saves / 37 shots)		Goalie stats	Curtis Sanford (5 – 2, 34 saves / 38 shots)

April 5	Owen Sound Platers	4 – 3	Guelph Storm	Guelph Memorial Gardens	Recap
Wes Goldie (6) - 5:06; Adam Mair (6) - pp - 10:45		First period	3:05 - Charlie Stephens (1)
No scoring		Second period	4:20 - Bob Crummer (5); 12:08 - pp - Lindsay Plunkett (4)
Peter Campbell (6) - 7:27; Dave Stephenson (2) - 8:49		Third period	No scoring
Curtis Sanford (6 – 2, 42 saves / 45 shots)		Goalie stats	Chris Madden (5 – 2, 36 saves / 40 shots)

April 7	Guelph Storm	3 – 4	Owen Sound Platers	Bayshore Community Centre	Recap
No scoring		First period	6:47 - pp - Peter Campbell (7)
Kent McDonell (3) - 8:57; Kent McDonell (4) - pp - 10:34; Joe Gerbe (3) - 11:49		Second period	13:07 - pp - Dan Snyder (6); 17:50 - Mike Lankshear (3); 18:22 - Jan Sulc (3)
No scoring		Third period	No scoring
Craig Anderson (0 – 2, 40 saves / 44 shots)		Goalie stats	Curtis Sanford (7 – 2, 32 saves / 35 shots)

April 9	Owen Sound Platers	1 – 4	Guelph Storm	Guelph Memorial Gardens	Recap
No scoring		First period	10:03 - Eric Beaudoin (4); 15:26 - Darryl Knight (2)
No scoring		Second period	4:32 - pp - Charlie Stephens (2)
Adam Mair (7) - pp - 4:53		Third period	12:36 - Joe Gerbe (4)
Curtis Sanford (7 – 3, 33 saves / 37 shots)		Goalie stats	Chris Madden (6 – 2, 40 saves / 41 shots)

April 11	Guelph Storm	3 – 6	Owen Sound Platers	Bayshore Community Centre	Recap
Charlie Stephens (3) - 7:32		First period	No scoring
Eric Beaudoin (5) - 4:03; Joe Gerbe (5) - 13:24		Second period	9:07 - Randy Davidson (1); 14:35 - Mike Dombkiewicz (2); 17:01 - Dan Snyder (7)
No scoring		Third period	1:54 - Joel Ward (2); 8:30 - Adan Mair (8); 19:36 - en - sh - Jan Sulc (4)
Chris Madden (6 – 3, 45 saves / 50 shots)		Goalie stats	Curtis Sanford (8 – 3, 44 saves / 47 shots)

Owen Sound wins series 4 – 2

=== Conference finals ===
==== Eastern conference finals ====
===== (3) Belleville Bulls vs. (4) Oshawa Generals =====
April 16	Oshawa Generals	1 – 8	Belleville Bulls	Yardmen Arena	Recap
No scoring		First period	4:36 - Justin Papineau (5); 14:37 - sh - Justin Papineau (6); 19:31 - Kevin Baker (10)
Jim Baxter (4) - pp - 14:49		Second period	18:53 - Justin Papineau (7)
No scoring		Third period	13:04 - pp - Derek Campbell (2); 15:38 - Branko Radivojevic (3); 16:43 - Glenn Crawford (8); 18:13 - Kevin Baker (11)
Tyrone Garner (8 – 5, 36 saves / 44 shots)		Goalie stats	Cory Campbell (9 – 1, 23 saves / 24 shots)

April 18	Belleville Bulls	4 – 6	Oshawa Generals	Oshawa Civic Auditorium	Recap
Nathan Robinson (2) - 5:01; Justin Papineau (8) - pp - 13:07		First period	16:48 - pp - Andrew Peters (2)
Kris Newbury (3) - 15:38		Second period	1:29 - Jeff MacMillan (3); 6:04 - pp - Brian Passmore (5); 6:13 - Brian Passmore (6)
Kelly Paddon (1) - pp - 13:28		Third period	9:57 - pp - Brandon Coalter (3); 15:28 - pp - Brent Gauvreau (9)
Cory Campbell (9 – 2, 34 saves / 40 shots)		Goalie stats	Tyrone Garner (9 – 5, 36 saves / 40 shots)

April 20	Oshawa Generals	2 – 4	Belleville Bulls	Yardmen Arena	Recap
John Kozoriz (4) - 11:06		First period	2:06 - Kris Newbury (4); 11:40 - pp - Ryan Ready (8)
Derrell Upton (5) - 19:11		Second period	1:46 - Nathan Robinson (3)
No scoring		Third period	8:57 - Glenn Crawford (9)
Tyrone Garner (9 – 6, 43 saves / 47 shots)		Goalie stats	Cory Campbell (10 – 2, 23 saves / 25 shots)

April 21	Belleville Bulls	6 – 4	Oshawa Generals	Oshawa Civic Auditorium	Recap
Derek Campbell (3) - 7:50; Branko Radivojevic (4) - 19:14		First period	0:49 - Brandon Coalter (4)
Justin Papineau (9) - pp - 8:29		Second period	9:43 - Kevin Colley (8); 17:43 - John Kozoriz (5)
Derek Campbell (4) - 0:37; Derek Campbell (5) - 12:51; Justin Papineau (10) - en - 19:22		Third period	19:05 - Brad Ralph (8)
Cory Campbell (11 – 2, 33 saves / 37 shots)		Goalie stats	Tyrone Garner (9 – 7, 26 saves / 31 shots)

April 23	Oshawa Generals	2 – 8	Belleville Bulls	Yardmen Arena	Recap
Derrell Upton (6) - sh - 10:13		First period	9:11 - pp - Justin Papineau (11)
Brent Gauvreau (10) - 15:42		Second period	4:48 - pp - Mike Renzi (3); 7:37 - Justin Papineau (12); 11:29 - pp - Jonathan Cheechoo (6)
No scoring		Third period	3:34 - pp - Branko Radivojevic (5); 6:49 - pp - Justin Papineau (13); 19:10 - pp - Mike Renzi (4); 19:57 - Kelly Paddon (2)
Tyrone Garner (9 – 8, 39 saves / 47 shots)		Goalie stats	Cory Campbell (12 – 2, 30 saves / 32 shots)

Belleville wins series 4 – 1

==== Western conference finals ====
===== (3) Owen Sound Platers vs. (5) London Knights =====
April 18	Owen Sound Platers	0 – 3	London Knights	London Ice House	Recap
No scoring		First period	6:06 - Tom Kostopoulos (12); 9:59 - Peter Reynolds (2)
No scoring		Second period	2:16 - Krys Barch (7)
No scoring		Third period	No scoring
Curtis Sanford (8 – 4, 47 saves / 50 shots)		Goalie stats	Gene Chiarello (9 – 5, 33 saves / 33 shots)

April 20	London Knights	2 – 3	Owen Sound Platers	Bayshore Community Centre	Recap
Joel Scherban (3) - 2:04		First period	8:12 - pp - Wes Goldie (7)
Richard Pitirri (9) - 10:41		Second period	4:29 - pp - Wes Goldie (8)
No scoring		Third period	6:17 - pp - Wes Goldie (9)
Gene Chiarello (9 – 6, 51 saves / 54 shots)		Goalie stats	Curtis Sanford (9 – 4, 44 saves / 46 shots)

April 22	London Knights	3 – 1	Owen Sound Platers	Bayshore Community Centre	Recap
No scoring		First period	No scoring
Rico Fata (8) - pp - 14:32; Jason Doyle (4) - pp - 18:00		Second period	10:21 - pp - Adam Mair (9)
Richard Pitirri (10) - 3:29		Third period	No scoring
Gene Chiarello (10 – 6, 40 saves / 41 shots)		Goalie stats	Curtis Sanford (9 – 5, 34 saves / 37 shots)

April 23	Owen Sound Platers	3 – 4	London Knights	London Ice House	Recap
No scoring		First period	9:47 - Jay Legault (5)
Adam Mair (10) - pp - 2:05; Wes Goldie (10) - 3:00; Peter Campbell (8) - 4:16		Second period	13:02 - pp - Alex Henry (3); 16:30 - Chris Kelly (5)
No scoring		Third period	5:36 - Jason Doyle (5)
Curtis Sanford (9 – 6, 50 saves / 54 shots)		Goalie stats	Gene Chiarello (11 – 6, 38 saves / 41 shots)

April 25	London Knights	4 – 3	Owen Sound Platers	Bayshore Community Centre	Recap
Mike Mazzuca (3) - 1:14; Tom Kostopoulos (13) - 3:45		First period	No scoring
Joel Scherban (4) - 1:39		Second period	5:02 - Mike Dombkiewicz (3); 11:43 - Dan Snyder (8)
Joel Scherban (5) - 1:14		Third period	8:08 - pp - Wes Goldie (11)
Gene Chiarello (12 – 6, 26 saves / 29 shots)		Goalie stats	Curtis Sanford (9 – 7, 43 saves / 47 shots)

London wins series 4 – 1

=== OHL finals ===
==== J. Ross Robertson cup finals ====
===== (E3) Belleville Bulls vs. (W5) London Knights =====
April 29	London Knights	5 – 4	OT	Belleville Bulls	Yardmen Arena	Recap
Krys Barch (8) - pp - 12:21		First period		9:38 - Justin Papineau (14); 17:16 - Glenn Crawford (10)
Tom Kostopoulos (14) - 3:08		Second period		9:47 - pp - Kevin Baker (12)
Tyler Durham (1) - 5:58; Krys Barch (9) - 11:49		Third period		7:13 - Kelly Paddon (3)
Adam Saffer (2) - 8:17		First overtime period		No scoring
Gene Chiarello (13 – 6, 44 saves / 48 shots)		Goalie stats		Cory Campbell (12 – 3, 35 saves / 40 shots)

May 1	Belleville Bulls	6 – 3	London Knights	London Ice House	Recap
Ryan Ready (9) - pp - 4:26; Justin Papineau (15) - pp - 9:13		First period	No scoring
Randy Rowe (6) - pp - 0:47; Nathan Robinson (4) - 15:54		Second period	No scoring
Glenn Crawford (11) - 1:01; Justin Papineau (16) - 2:27		Third period	0:30 - pp - Jay Legault (6); 8:18 - pp - Jason Doyle (6); 11:10 - Chris Kelly (6)
Cory Campbell (13 – 3, 36 saves / 39 shots)		Goalie stats	Gene Chiarello (13 – 7, 44 saves / 50 shots)

May 3	London Knights	3 – 5	Belleville Bulls	Yardmen Arena	Recap
No scoring		First period	17:46 - Mike Renzi (5)
John Erskine (5) - 17:33		Second period	No scoring
Richard Pitirri (11) - 17:59; Tom Kostopoulos (15) - sh - 19:30		Third period	4:56 - Jonathan Cheechoo (7); 7:04 - pp - Jonathan Cheechoo (8); 9:37 - pp - Randy Rowe (7); 19:59 - Justin Papineau (17)
Gene Chiarello (13 – 8, 43 saves / 48 shots)		Goalie stats	Cory Campbell (14 – 3, 30 saves / 33 shots)

May 5	Belleville Bulls	6 – 1	London Knights	London Ice House	Recap
Branko Radivojevic (6) - 1:25; Derek Campbell (6) - 3:00; Justin Papineau (18) - 8:21; Chris Stanley (1) - pp - 11:28		First period	15:42 - pp - Tom Kostopoulos (16)
Justin Papineau (19) - sh - 12:44; Randy Rowe (8) - 16:38		Second period	No scoring
No scoring		Third period	No scoring
Cory Campbell (15 – 3, 32 saves / 33 shots)		Goalie stats	Gene Chiarello (13 – 9, 38 saves / 44 shots)

May 7	London Knights	6 – 4	Belleville Bulls	Yardmen Arena	Recap
Tom Kostopoulos (17) - 18:55		First period	3:54 - sh - Randy Rowe (9)
Richard Pitirri (12) - 7:05		Second period	19:34 - pp - Jonathan Cheechoo (9)
Tom Kostopoulos (18) - pp - 6:59; Jason Doyle (7) - 7:35; Chris Kelly (7) - pp - 9:24; Rico Fata (9) - 9:32		Third period	11:32 - pp - Jonathan Cheechoo (10); 16:25 - Glenn Crawford (12)
Gene Chiarello (14 – 9, 26 saves / 30 shots)		Goalie stats	Cory Campbell (15 – 4, 29 saves / 35 shots)

May 9	Belleville Bulls	1 – 5	London Knights	London Ice House	Recap
No scoring		First period	5:27 - Tom Kostopoulos (19)
Justin Papineau (20) - pp - 16:22		Second period	9:58 - pp - Rico Fata (10); 18:09 - pp - Jay Legault (7)
No scoring		Third period	14:16 - Jay Legault (8); 16:11 - pp - Chris Kelly (8)
Cory Campbell (15 – 5, 37 saves / 42 shots)		Goalie stats	Gene Chiarello (15 – 9, 29 saves / 30 shots)

May 11	London Knights	2 – 9	Belleville Bulls	Yardmen Arena	Recap
Chris Kelly (9) - 17:40		First period	7:47 - Glenn Crawford (13); 10:23 - pp - Branko Radivojevic (7); 12:28 - Jonathan Cheechoo (11); 16:02 - Justin Papineau (21)
Mike Mazzuca (4) - 13:28		Second period	0:23 - Jonathan Cheechoo (12); 12:20 - Jonathan Cheechoo (13); 14:45 - Jonathan Cheechoo (14)
No scoring		Third period	3:49 - pp - Ryan Ready (10); 10:12 - Jonathan Cheechoo (15)
Gene Chiarello (15 – 10, 48 saves / 57 shots)		Goalie stats	Cory Campbell (16 – 5, 30 saves / 32 shots)

Belleville wins series 4 – 3

=== J. Ross Robertson Cup Champions Roster ===
1998-99 Belleville Bulls
Goaltenders: (Canada) 1 – Cory Campbell; (Canada) 30 – Chad Mehlenbacher	Defencemen: (Canada) 2 – Nick Policelli; (United States) 4 – Jason Lawmaker; (Canada) 5 – Michael Jacobsen; (Canada) 14 – Kelly Paddon; (Czech Republic) 24 – Branislav Mezei; (Canada) 25 – Rick Bertran; (Canada) 44 – Adam Collins	Wingers: (Canada) 8 – Tyler Longo; (Canada) 11 – Ryan Ready; (Canada) 18 – Randy Rowe; (Canada) 19 – Jonathan Cheechoo; (Slovakia) 22 – Branko Radivojevic; (Canada) 23 – Kevin Baker; (Canada) 37 – Derek Campbell	Centres: (Canada) 7 – Kris Newbury; (Canada) 9 – Mike Renzi; (Canada) 10 – Mark Chaplin; (Canada) 13 – Chris Stanley; (Canada) 16 – Glenn Crawford; (Canada) 17 – Justin Papineau; (Canada) 77 – Nathan Robinson; Coach: (Canada) Lou Crawford; General Manager: (Canada) Robert Vaughan

=== Playoff scoring leaders ===
Note: GP = Games played; G = Goals; A = Assists; Pts = Points; PIM = Penalty minutes

Player	Team	GP	G	A	Pts	PIM
Justin Papineau	Belleville Bulls	21	21	30	51	20
Ryan Ready	Belleville Bulls	21	10	28	38	22
Tom Kostopoulos	London Knights	25	19	16	35	32
Richard Pitirri	London Knights	25	12	22	34	24
Jonathan Cheechoo	Belleville Bulls	21	15	15	30	27
Krys Barch	London Knights	25	9	17	26	15
Chris Kelly	London Knights	25	9	17	26	22
Jay Legault	London Knights	25	8	18	26	40
Mike Dombkiewicz	Owen Sound Platers	16	3	22	25	22
Glenn Crawford	Belleville Bulls	21	13	11	24	22

=== Playoff leading goaltenders ===
Note: GP = Games played; Mins = Minutes played; W = Wins; L = Losses: OTL = Overtime losses; SL = Shootout losses; GA = Goals Allowed; SO = Shutouts; GAA = Goals against average

Player	Team	GP	Mins	W	L	GA	SO	Sv%	GAA
Seamus Kotyk	Ottawa 67's	5	338	3	2	13	0	0.912	2.31
J. F. Perras	Erie Otters	5	245	1	3	11	0	0.937	2.69
Levente Szuper	Ottawa 67's	4	241	2	2	11	1	0.924	2.73
Brian Finley	Barrie Colts	5	324	4	1	15	0	0.917	2.78
Greg Hewitt	Sarnia Sting	5	323	1	4	15	0	0.939	2.79

== All-Star teams ==
=== First team ===
- Daniel Tkaczuk, Centre, Barrie Colts
- Ryan Ready, Left Wing, Belleville Bulls
- Ivan Novoseltsev, Right Wing, Sarnia Sting
- Brian Campbell, Defence, Ottawa 67's
- Bryan Allen, Defence, Oshawa Generals
- Brian Finley, Goaltender, Barrie Colts
- Peter DeBoer, Coach, Plymouth Whalers

=== Second team ===
- Harold Druken, Centre, Plymouth Whalers
- Denis Shvidki, Left Wing, Barrie Colts
- Norm Milley, Right Wing, Sudbury Wolves
- Kevin Mitchell, Defence, Guelph Storm
- Martin Skoula, Defence, Barrie Colts
- Tyrone Garner, Goaltender, Oshawa Generals
- Lou Crawford, Coach, Belleville Bulls

=== Third team ===
- Peter Sarno, Centre, Sarnia Sting
- Jay Legault, Left Wing, London Knights
- Sheldon Keefe, Right Wing, Barrie Colts
- Nick Boynton, Defence, Ottawa 67's
- Nikos Tselios, Defence, Plymouth Whalers
- Seamus Kotyk, Goaltender, Ottawa 67's
- Dave Siciliano, Coach, Owen Sound Platers

== Awards ==
J. Ross Robertson Cup:	Belleville Bulls
Hamilton Spectator Trophy:	Plymouth Whalers
Bobby Orr Trophy:	Belleville Bulls
Wayne Gretzky Trophy:	London Knights
Leyden Trophy:	Ottawa 67's
Emms Trophy:	Barrie Colts
Holody Trophy:	Guelph Storm
Bumbacco Trophy:	Plymouth Whalers
Red Tilson Trophy:	Brian Campbell, Ottawa 67's
Eddie Powers Memorial Trophy:	Peter Sarno, Sarnia Sting
Matt Leyden Trophy:	Pete DeBoer, Plymouth Whalers
Jim Mahon Memorial Trophy:	Norm Milley, Sudbury Wolves
Max Kaminsky Trophy:	Brian Campbell, Ottawa 67's
OHL Goaltender of the Year:	Brian Finley, Barrie Colts
Jack Ferguson Award:	Jason Spezza, Mississauga IceDogs
Dave Pinkney Trophy:	Robert Holsinger and Rob Zepp, Plymouth Whalers
OHL Executive of the Year:	Jeff Hunt, Ottawa 67's
Emms Family Award:	Sheldon Keefe, Barrie Colts
F.W. 'Dinty' Moore Trophy:	Levente Szuper, Ottawa 67's
OHL Humanitarian of the Year:	Ryan McKie, Sudbury Wolves
William Hanley Trophy:	Brian Campbell, Ottawa 67's
Leo Lalonde Memorial Trophy:	Ryan Ready, Belleville Bulls
Bobby Smith Trophy:	Rob Zepp, Plymouth Whalers
Wayne Gretzky 99 Award:	Justin Papineau, Belleville Bulls

== 1999 OHL Priority Selection ==
On June 5, 1999, the OHL conducted the 1999 Ontario Hockey League Priority Selection at the Brampton Centre for Sports & Entertainment in Brampton, Ontario. The Mississauga IceDogs held the first overall pick in the draft, and selected Jason Spezza from the Brampton Battalion. Spezza was awarded the Jack Ferguson Award, awarded to the top pick in the draft.

Below are the players who were selected in the first round of the 1999 Ontario Hockey League Priority Selection.

#	Player	Nationality	OHL Team	Hometown	Minor Team
1	Jason Spezza (C)	Canada	Mississauga IceDogs	Brampton, Ontario	Brampton Battalion
2	Jay McClement (C)	Canada	Brampton Battalion	Kingston, Ontario	Kingston Voyageurs
3	Jeffrey Doyle (RW)	Canada	Toronto St. Michael's Majors	King City, Ontario	Vaughan Kings
4	Steve Eminger (D)	Canada	Kitchener Rangers	Woodbridge, Ontario	Bramalea Blues
5	Cory Stillman (C)	Canada	Kingston Frontenacs	Lindsay, Ontario	Lindsay Muskies
6	Chris Thorburn (RW)	Canada	North Bay Centennials	Sault Ste. Marie, Ontario	Elliot Lake Ice
7	Tim Gleason (D)	United States	Windsor Spitfires	Clawson, Michigan	Leamington Flyers
8	Miguel Beaudry (G)	Canada	Sudbury Wolves	Verner, Ontario	Collingwood Blackhawks
9	Scott Rozendal (LW)	Canada	Erie Otters	Listowel, Ontario	Collingwood Blackhawks
10	Trevor Daley (D)	Canada	Sault Ste. Marie Greyhounds	Toronto, Ontario	Vaughan Vipers
11	Matthew Albiani (C)	Canada	London Knights	Sudbury, Ontario	Sudbury Wolves Bantam
12	Jason Penner (LW)	Canada	Sarnia Sting	Leamington, Ontario	Leamington Flyers
13	Ryan Ramsay (C)	Canada	Peterborough Petes	Ajax, Ontario	Ajax Attack
14	Greg Jacina (LW)	Canada	Owen Sound Platers	Guelph, Ontario	Orangeville Crushers
15	Nick Lees (C)	Canada	Oshawa Generals	Peterborough, Ontario	Peterborough Petes Bantam
16	Kyle Wellwood (C/RW)	Canada	Belleville Bulls	Windsor, Ontario	Tecumseh Chiefs
17	Colt King (LW)	Canada	Guelph Storm	Thunder Bay, Ontario	St. Thomas Stars
18	Brendan Bell (D)	Canada	Ottawa 67's	Ottawa, Ontario	Ottawa Jr. Senators
19	Erik Reitz (D)	United States	Barrie Colts	Plymouth, Michigan	Leamington Flyers
20	Stephen Weiss (C)	Canada	Plymouth Whalers	Markham, Ontario	North York Rangers

== See also ==
- List of OHA Junior A standings
- List of OHL seasons
- 1999 Memorial Cup
- 1999 NHL entry draft
- 1998 in sports
- 1999 in sports

Preceded by 1997–98 OHL season	OHL seasons	Succeeded by 1999–2000 OHL season
