= 2005 Central Hockey League All-Star Game =

The 2005 CHL All-Star Game (for sponsorship reasons officially named the 2005 Dodge CHL All-Star Game) was played on January 12, 2005 in Laredo, Texas. The format featured the Northern Conference All-Stars vs. the Southern Conference All-Stars, with each Central Hockey League team having a minimum of one representative to appear on the All-Star roster.

The starting line-ups were selected through balloting among the CHL coaches, broadcasting and/or public relations staff, and designated media members in each CHL market. The remaining players were chosen by the All-Star coaches in concurrence with the CHL's hockey operations department.

== Starting line-ups ==
=== Northern Conference ===
- Chris Stewart, Colorado Eagles (Coach)
- Chad Woollard, Fort Worth Brahmas (Forward)
- Greg Pankewicz, Colorado Eagles (Forward)
- Don Parsons, Memphis Riverkings (Forward)
- Paul Esdale, Wichita Thunder (Defence)
- Derek Landmesser, Memphis Riverkings (Defence)
- Tyler Weiman, Colorado Eagles (Goal)

=== Southern Conference ===
- Chris Dashney, Lubbock Cotton Kings (Coach)
- Derek Hahn, Amarillo Gorillas (Forward)
- Jason Baird, Corpus Christi Rayz (Forward)
- Brent Cullaton, Lubbock Cotton Kings (Forward)
- Bernie John, Corpus Christi Rayz (Defence)
- Derick Martin, Lubbock Cotton Kings (Defence)
- Scott Reid, San Angelo Saints (Goal)
