= Kevin Colley =

American-born Canadian ice hockey player

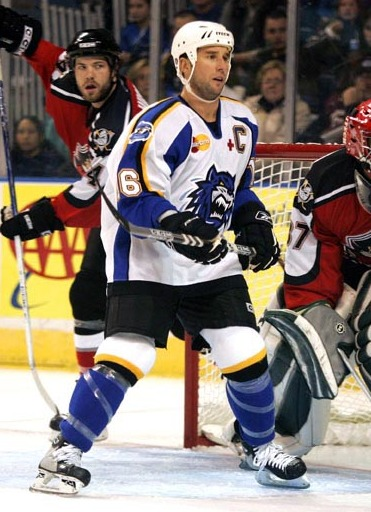
- Colley with the Bridgeport Sound Tigers in 2005
- Born: January 4, 1979 (age 47) New Haven, Connecticut, U.S.
- Height: 5 ft 11 in (180 cm)
- Weight: 185 lb (84 kg; 13 st 3 lb)
- Position: Center
- Shot: Right
- Played for: New York Islanders
- NHL draft: Undrafted
- Playing career: 1999–2006

Kevin Colley (born January 4, 1979) is an American-born Canadian former professional ice hockey right winger who played for the New York Islanders of the NHL, and was the head coach of the Arizona Sundogs of the CHL in 2013–14. He was raised in Collingwood, Ontario.

== Playing career ==
Colley was signed as a free agent by the Islanders on June 11, 2004. Colley fractured his fifth cervical vertebra in a game against the Washington Capitals on January 31, 2006. As a result of the injuries sustained to his neck and at the behest of his doctors, Colley officially retired from professional ice hockey on February 24, 2006. Colley's father, Tom (1953-2021), was a former NHL player.

On April 8, 2006, prior to their game against the Washington Capitals, the Islanders presented Colley with the Bob Nystrom Award, an award given to the Islander "who best exemplifies leadership, hustle and dedication" as voted on by the fans.

== Career statistics ==
=== Regular season and playoffs ===
			Regular season					Playoffs
Season	Team	League	GP	G	A	Pts	PIM	GP	G	A	Pts	PIM
1994–95	Collingwood Blues	OPJHL	48	13	15	28	24	4	1	2	3	0
1995–96	Collingwood Blues	OPJHL	42	20	36	56	53	—	—	—	—	—
1996–97	Oshawa Generals	OHL	64	19	17	36	46	16	2	4	6	25
1996–97	Oshawa Generals	M-Cup	—	—	—	—	—	4	1	2	3	4
1997–98	Oshawa Generals	OHL	57	27	41	68	107	7	1	5	6	14
1998–99	Oshawa Generals	OHL	63	39	62	101	68	16	8	16	24	32
1999–00	Hartford Wolf Pack	AHL	5	0	0	0	2	—	—	—	—	—
1999–00	Charlotte Checkers	ECHL	5	2	1	3	10	—	—	—	—	—
1999–00	Dayton Bombers	ECHL	24	8	6	14	111	2	1	0	1	4
2000–01	Pensacola Ice Pilots	ECHL	23	6	11	17	44	—	—	—	—	—
2000–01	New Orleans Brass	ECHL	23	11	8	19	27	8	1	1	2	12
2001–02	Atlantic City Boardwalk Bullies	ECHL	41	23	30	53	90	—	—	—	—	—
2001–02	Providence Bruins	AHL	4	0	1	1	27	—	—	—	—	—
2001–02	Rochester Americans	AHL	25	3	4	7	70	2	0	1	1	0
2002–03	Atlantic City Boardwalk Bullies	ECHL	50	33	38	71	190	17	13	7	20	27
2002–03	Syracuse Crunch	AHL	16	2	3	5	6	—	—	—	—	—
2002–03	Worcester Ice Cats	AHL	6	1	1	2	27	—	—	—	—	—
2003–04	Bridgeport Sound Tigers	AHL	78	12	19	31	122	3	1	0	1	12
2004–05	Bridgeport Sound Tigers	AHL	59	11	13	24	212	—	—	—	—	—
2005–06	Bridgeport Sound Tigers	AHL	21	5	5	10	60	—	—	—	—	—
2005–06	New York Islanders	NHL	16	0	0	0	52	—	—	—	—	—
AHL totals			214	34	46	80	526	5	1	1	2	12
NHL totals			16	0	0	0	52	—	—	—	—	—

=== International ===
Year	Team	Event	GP	G	A	Pts	PIM
1998	United States	WJC	7	0	3	3	6
Junior totals			7	0	3	3	6
