= Jan Šulc (ice hockey) =

- Born: 17 February 1979 (age 47) Litvínov, Czechoslovakia
- Height: 6 ft 3 in (191 cm)
- Weight: 187 lb (85 kg; 13 st 5 lb)
- Position: Centre
- Shot: Right
- Played for: Toledo Storm; Detroit Vipers; Johnstown Chiefs; HC Litvínov
- NHL draft: 109th overall, 1997; Tampa Bay Lightning
- Playing career: 1995–2007

Jan Šulc (born 17 February 1979) is a Czech former professional ice hockey centre. He played in the Czech Extraliga for HC Litvínov and also played in the East Coast Hockey League for the Toledo Storm and Johnstown Chiefs and the International Hockey League for the Detroit Vipers. He was drafted 109th overall by the Tampa Bay Lightning in the 1997 NHL entry draft.

== Career statistics ==
			Regular season					Playoffs
Season	Team	League	GP	G	A	Pts	PIM	GP	G	A	Pts	PIM
1995–96	HC Litvinov U18	Czech U18	34	13	23	36	—	—	—	—	—	—
1996–97	HC Litvinov U18	Czech U20	33	20	16	36	—	—	—	—	—	—
1997–98	Toronto St. Michael's Majors	OHL	34	3	10	13	11	—	—	—	—	—
1997–98	Kingston Frontenacs	OHL	29	6	8	14	7	12	0	0	0	0
1998–99	Kingston Frontenacs	OHL	13	4	4	8	6	—	—	—	—	—
1998–99	Owen Sound Platers	OHL	53	20	29	49	59	16	4	8	12	18
1999–00	Toledo Storm	ECHL	51	10	11	21	40	—	—	—	—	—
1999–00	Detroit Vipers	IHL	21	0	3	3	15	—	—	—	—	—
2000–01	Johnstown Chiefs	ECHL	54	6	17	23	41	—	—	—	—	—
2000–01	Detroit Vipers	IHL	16	2	1	3	4	—	—	—	—	—
2001–02	HC Chemopetrol Litvinov	Czech	7	2	2	4	6	—	—	—	—	—
2002–03	HC Chemopetrol Litvinov	Czech	30	3	1	4	14	—	—	—	—	—
2003–04	HC VCE Hradec Králové	Czech2	27	9	12	21	18	—	—	—	—	—
2003–04	HC Slovan Ustecti Lvi	Czech2	11	1	2	3	4	4	0	0	0	2
2004–05	SK Horacka Slavia Trebic	Czech2	5	0	0	0	0	—	—	—	—	—
2004–05	HC VCE Hradec Kralove	Czech2	16	2	3	5	10	—	—	—	—	—
2004–05	KLH Chomutov	Czech2	17	2	10	12	26	—	—	—	—	—
2005–06	KLH Chomutov	Czech2	49	4	9	13	70	4	0	1	1	0
2006–07	HC Most	Czech3	26	7	13	20	30	—	—	—	—	—
2006–07	HC Stadion Teplice	Czech3	9	8	5	13	34	—	—	—	—	—
Czech totals			37	5	3	8	20	—	—	—	—	—
Czech2 totals			125	18	36	54	128	8	0	1	1	2
