= Matt Elich =

American ice hockey player (born 1978)

- Born: September 22, 1978 (age 47) Grosse Pointe, Michigan, U.S.
- Height: 6 ft 1 in (185 cm)
- Weight: 200 lb (91 kg; 14 st 4 lb)
- Position: Right wing
- Shot: Right
- Played for: Tampa Bay Lightning
- NHL draft: 61st overall, 1997; Tampa Bay Lightning
- Playing career: 1999–2009

Matthew Jon-Porter Elich (born September 22, 1978) is an American former professional ice hockey winger.

== Biography ==
Elich was born in Grosse Pointe, Michigan. As a youth, he played in the 1992 Quebec International Pee-Wee Hockey Tournament with the Detroit Little Caesars minor ice hockey team.

Elich played junior ice hockey with the Windsor Spitfires in the Ontario Hockey League. He was drafted in the third round, 61st overall, by the Tampa Bay Lightning in the 1997 NHL entry draft.

Elich made his National Hockey League debut with the Lightning during the 1999–2000 NHL season, appearing in eight games and scoring one goal. He appeared in eight more games for the Lightning during the 2000–01 NHL season.

== Career statistics ==
			Regular season					Playoffs
Season	Team	League	GP	G	A	Pts	PIM	GP	G	A	Pts	PIM
1995–96	Windsor Spitfires	OHL	52	10	2	12	17	5	1	0	1	2
1996–97	Windsor Spitfires	OHL	58	15	13	28	19	5	0	1	1	6
1997–98	Kingston Frontenacs	OHL	34	14	4	18	2	12	2	4	6	2
1998–99	Kingston Frontenacs	OHL	67	44	30	74	32	5	3	5	8	0
1999–00	Detroit Vipers	IHL	48	12	4	16	12	—	—	—	—	—
1999–00	Tampa Bay Lightning	NHL	8	1	1	2	0	—	—	—	—	—
2000–01	Detroit Vipers	IHL	60	12	16	28	12	—	—	—	—	—
2000–01	Tampa Bay Lightning	NHL	8	0	0	0	0	—	—	—	—	—
2001–02	Springfield Falcons	AHL	22	2	2	4	4	—	—	—	—	—
2002–03	Pensacola Ice Pilots	ECHL	12	4	4	8	6	—	—	—	—	—
2002–03	Wheeling Nailers	ECHL	25	3	6	9	32	—	—	—	—	—
2003–04	Pensacola Ice Pilots	ECHL	2	1	0	1	4	—	—	—	—	—
2003–04	Greensboro Generals	ECHL	59	18	28	46	30	—	—	—	—	—
2004–05	South Carolina Stingrays	ECHL	23	3	1	4	20	—	—	—	—	—
2004–05	Idaho Steelheads	ECHL	32	8	7	15	16	1	0	0	0	0
2005–06	Flint Generals	UHL	45	22	15	37	70	—	—	—	—	—
2005–06	Roanoke Valley Vipers	UHL	28	12	15	27	10	—	—	—	—	—
2006–07	Jesenice	Austria	4	2	0	2	4	—	—	—	—	—
2006–07	Chur EHC	NLB	8	1	3	4	24	—	—	—	—	—
2007–08	Kalamazoo Wings	IHL	7	0	3	3	4	—	—	—	—	—
2007–08	Heilbronn Falcons	DEL2	13	1	3	4	18	7	2	3	5	16
2008–09	Cardiff Devils	EIHL	17	5	15	20	8	3	1	1	2	2
2008–09	Flint Generals	IHL	20	6	8	14	27	—	—	—	—	—
2008–09	Port Huron Icehawks	IHL	4	1	1	2	0	—	—	—	—	—
NHL totals			16	1	1	2	0	—	—	—	—	—
