= Kevin Mitchell (ice hockey) =

American ice hockey player (born 1980)

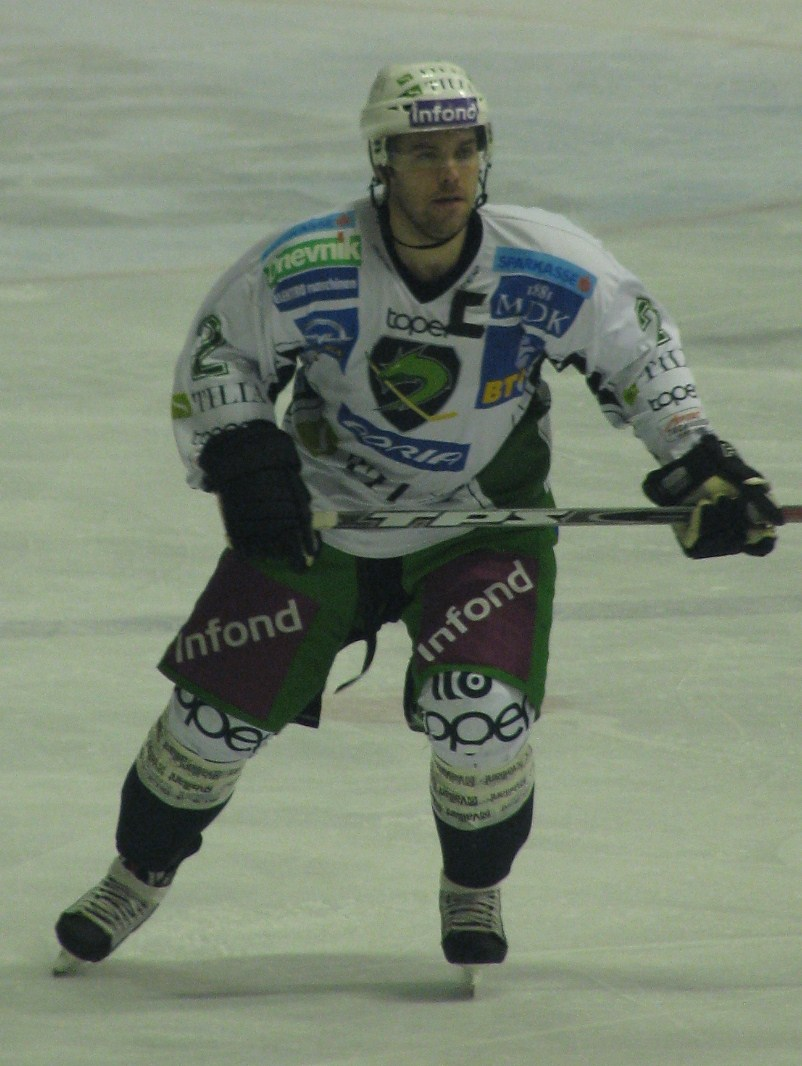
- Born: June 5, 1980 (age 45) The Bronx, New York, USA
- Height: 6 ft 1 in (185 cm)
- Weight: 194 lb (88 kg; 13 st 12 lb)
- Position: Defense
- Shoots: Left
- AL team Former teams: Nikko Icebucks; Hamilton Bulldogs; Houston Aeros; Bridgeport Sound Tigers; Cleveland Barons; Iserlohn Roosters; Vienna Capitals; Hamburg Freezers; HDD Olimpija Ljubljana; Rapperswil-Jona Lakers; HC Pardubice; EC VSV; Ritten-Renon; Mora IK; Graz 99ers
- NHL draft: 234th overall, 1998; Calgary Flames
- Playing career: 2000–present

Kevin Mitchell (born June 5, 1980) is an American professional ice hockey defenseman currently playing with the Nikko Icebucks in the Asia League Ice Hockey (AL). He was originally selected by the Calgary Flames in the 9th round (234th overall) of the 1998 NHL entry draft.

Mitchell played with EC VSV in the Austrian Hockey League during the 2010–11 Austrian Hockey League season.

After a season with Ritten-Renon in the Italian Serie A, Mitchell left as a free agent and signed a one-year contract with Swedish club, Mora IK of the HockeyAllsvenskan on June 20, 2013.

Mitchell recorded an impressive debut season from the blueline with Mora and was signed to a one-year contract extension on March 23, 2014. For the 2014–15 season, he was selected as team captain for Mora IK and responded with beating his previously scoring pace from the blueline, amassing 48 points in just 52 games.

On February 7, 2015, Mitchell signed a one-year contract to return to the familiar Austrian EBEL, in agreeing as a free agent with the Graz 99ers.

== Career statistics ==
			Regular season					Playoffs
Season	Team	League	GP	G	A	Pts	PIM	GP	G	A	Pts	PIM
1997–98	Guelph Storm	OHL	65	10	46	56	73	12	1	7	8	14
1998–99	Guelph Storm	OHL	68	26	52	78	107	11	3	10	13	29
1999–00	Guelph Storm	OHL	68	19	58	77	94	6	1	2	3	10
2000–01	Oshawa Generals	OHL	54	10	29	39	139	—	—	—	—	—
2000–01	Hamilton Bulldogs	AHL	8	0	3	3	2	—	—	—	—	—
2001–02	Louisiana IceGators	ECHL	63	7	32	39	127	5	1	3	4	16
2001–02	Houston Aeros	AHL	10	0	0	0	6	—	—	—	—	—
2002–03	Louisiana IceGators	ECHL	30	5	29	34	93	6	0	2	2	10
2002–03	Bridgeport Sound Tigers	AHL	18	1	4	5	16	—	—	—	—	—
2002–03	Cleveland Barons	AHL	24	2	5	7	22	—	—	—	—	—
2003–04	Houston Aeros	AHL	50	7	16	23	39	2	0	0	0	10
2003–04	Louisiana IceGators	AHL	19	3	14	17	28	2	1	0	1	0
2004–05	Iserlohn Roosters	DEL	50	8	29	37	149	—	—	—	—	—
2005–06	Vienna Capitals	EBEL	48	11	25	37	70	4	0	1	1	56
2006–07	Bridgeport Sound Tigers	AHL	45	1	12	13	53	—	—	—	—	—
2006–07	Hamburg Freezers	DEL	4	0	2	2	2	6	0	2	2	22
2007–08	HDD Olimpija Ljubljana	EBEL	42	9	24	33	126	15	5	7	12	26
2008–09	HDD Olimpija Ljubljana	EBEL	50	8	29	37	96	—	—	—	—	—
2008–09	Rapperswil-Jona Lakers	NLA	6	1	0	1	2	—	—	—	—	—
2009–10	HDD Olimpija Ljubljana	EBEL	45	9	25	34	105	—	—	—	—	—
2009–10	HC Pardubice	CZE	6	0	0	0	2	8	0	0	0	4
2010–11	EC VSV	EBEL	50	6	27	33	137	10	2	3	5	41
2011–12	EC VSV	EBEL	48	9	32	41	92	—	—	—	—	—
2012–13	Ritten-Renon	ITL	44	10	29	39	58	7	0	2	2	2
2013–14	Mora IK	Allsv	52	12	21	33	28	6	2	2	4	2
2014–15	Mora IK	Allsv	52	10	38	48	34	5	1	1	2	2
2015–16	Graz 99ers	EBEL	54	3	15	18	38	—	—	—	—	—
AHL totals			155	11	40	51	138	2	0	0	0	10
