= Randy Rowe =

Canadian ice hockey player

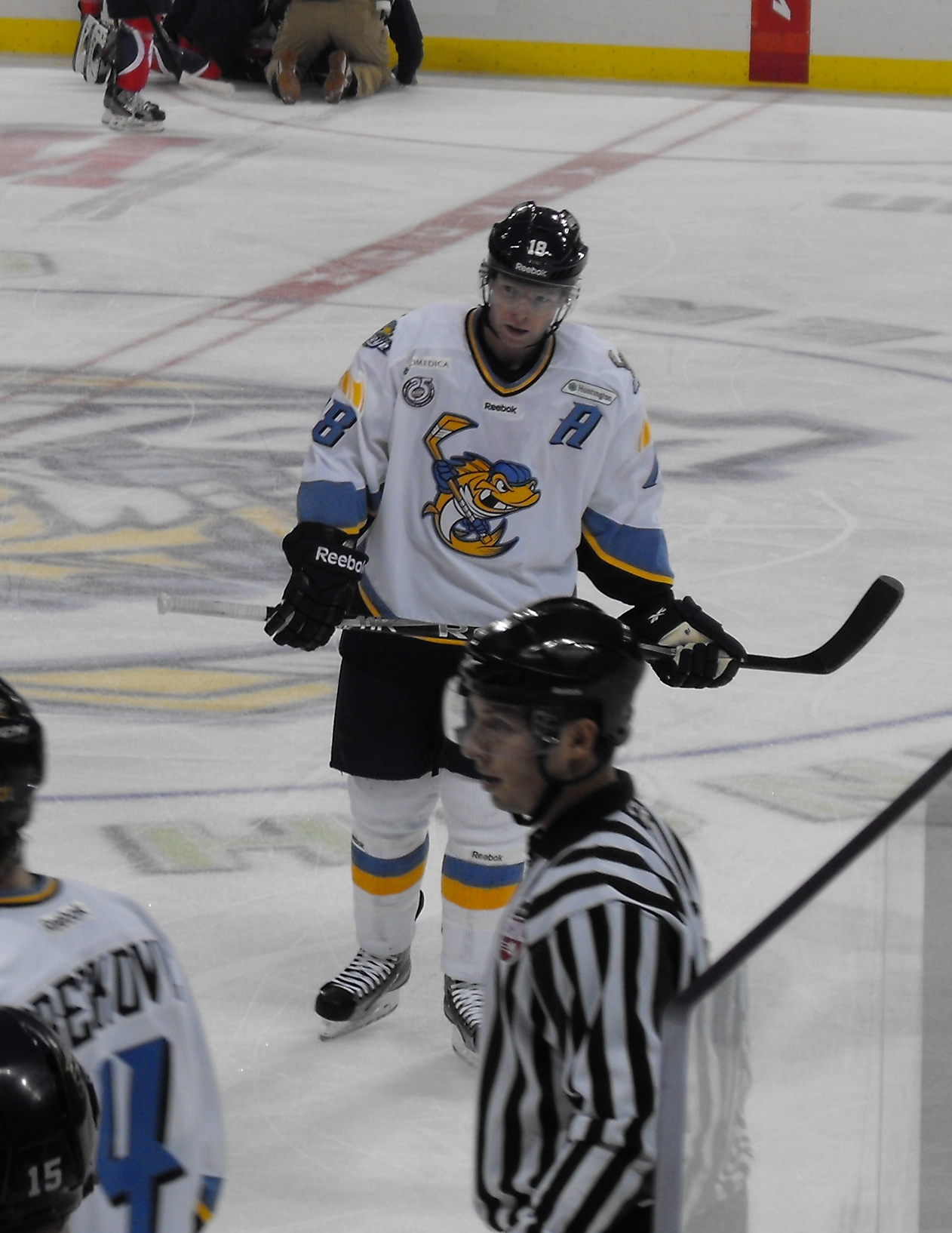
- Born: June 10, 1980 (age 45) Burford, Ontario, Canada
- Height: 5 ft 11 in (180 cm)
- Weight: 180 lb (82 kg; 12 st 12 lb)
- Position: Left Wing
- Shot: Left
- Played for: AHL; St. John's Maple Leafs; Springfield Falcons; Lake Erie Monsters; ECHL; Peoria Rivermen; Johnstown Chiefs; Charlotte Checkers; Toledo Walleye; Trenton Titans
- NHL draft: Undrafted
- Playing career: 2001–2013

Randy Rowe (born June 10, 1980) is a Canadian former professional ice hockey forward who played most notably in the ECHL, and became just the seventh player in league history to play over 600 games. He last played for the Toledo Walleye of the ECHL.

== Career ==
During his time with the Belleville Bulls, Rowe also attended two NHL training camps. Rowe attended his first rookie camp as a free agent in 1997 with the St. Louis Blues. The following season, Rowe attended the Vancouver Canucks' training camp and shared locker stalls with Canucks' captain Mark Messier.

After turning professional in 2001 with the Peoria Rivermen of the ECHL, Rowe split his career between the ECHL and the AHL. Rowe is one of the most decorated players in the history of the ECHL, he returned to the Walleye after spending the previous season in 2011–12 as captain of the Trenton Titans.

== Retirement ==
On August 13, 2013, he announced his retirement from professional hockey after 12 seasons, finishing 14th all-time in ECHL goal scoring. Since his retirement, Rowe had joined the OJHL's Wellington Dukes as an assistant coach.

== Career statistics ==
			Regular season					Playoffs
Season	Team	League	GP	G	A	Pts	PIM	GP	G	A	Pts	PIM
1997–98	Belleville Bulls	OHL	51	7	13	20	14	10	1	2	3	2
1998–99	Belleville Bulls	OHL	65	24	38	62	21	21	9	8	17	0
1999–2000	Belleville Bulls	OHL	67	25	39	64	24	16	7	13	20	6
2000–01	Belleville Bulls	OHL	63	64	38	102	30	10	9	6	15	6
2001–02	Peoria Rivermen	ECHL	58	14	17	31	20	5	1	0	1	2
2002–03	Peoria Rivermen	ECHL	69	28	40	68	38	4	0	0	0	2
2003–04	Peoria Rivermen	ECHL	49	30	26	56	28	—	—	—	—	—
2003–04	St. John's Maple Leafs	AHL	17	3	4	7	2	—	—	—	—	—
2004–05	Peoria Rivermen	ECHL	72	21	27	48	20	—	—	—	—	—
2005–06	Johnstown Chiefs	ECHL	45	28	15	43	28	5	2	2	4	2
2005–06	Springfield Falcons	AHL	3	0	0	0	2	—	—	—	—	—
2006–07	Johnstown Chiefs	ECHL	34	15	23	38	22	—	—	—	—	—
2006–07	Springfield Falcons	AHL	17	2	1	3	0	—	—	—	—	—
2007–08	Johnstown Chiefs	ECHL	58	24	44	68	35	5	4	3	7	14
2008–09	Johnstown Chiefs	ECHL	33	12	19	31	20	—	—	—	—	—
2008–09	Lake Erie Monsters	AHL	37	6	7	13	10	—	—	—	—	—
2009–10	Charlotte Checkers	ECHL	17	11	7	18	6	11	1	5	6	6
2009–10	Lake Erie Monsters	AHL	25	5	11	16	2	—	—	—	—	—
2010–11	Toledo Walleye	ECHL	65	19	30	49	28	—	—	—	—	—
2010–11	Lake Erie Monsters	AHL	2	0	0	0	0	—	—	—	—	—
2011–12	Trenton Titans	ECHL	61	20	21	41	32	—	—	—	—	—
2012–13	Toledo Walleye	ECHL	61	14	16	30	19	1	0	0	0	2
2013–14	Dundas Real McCoys	ACH	6	2	5	7	0	3	1	1	2	0
2013–14	Dundas Real McCoys	AC	—	—	—	—	—	4	1	0	1	2
ECHL totals			622	236	285	521	296	31	8	10	18	28
AHL totals			101	16	23	39	16	—	—	—	—	—

== Awards and honors ==
- 1998-99, Won the J. Ross Robertson Cup as a member of the Belleville Bulls
- 2000-01, Most goals scored (64), OHL
- 2000-01, Named to the CHL Third All-Star Team
- 2000-01, Awarded the Leo Lalonde Memorial Trophy for best overage player in the OHL
- 2003-04, Played in ECHL All-Star Game, named MVP
- 2007-08, Named ECHL Player Of The Week (March 24–30, 2008)
- 2007-08, Named ECHL Player Of The Month (April 2008)
- 2007-08, Named ECHL Plus Performer of the Month (April 2008)
- 2007-08, Led Johnstown Chiefs in points scored (68) and plus/minus (+21)
- 2000-10, Named to the ECHL All-Decade Team
- 2012-13, Awarded the ECHL Sportsmanship Award
