= Charlie Stephens =

Canadian ice hockey player (born 1981)

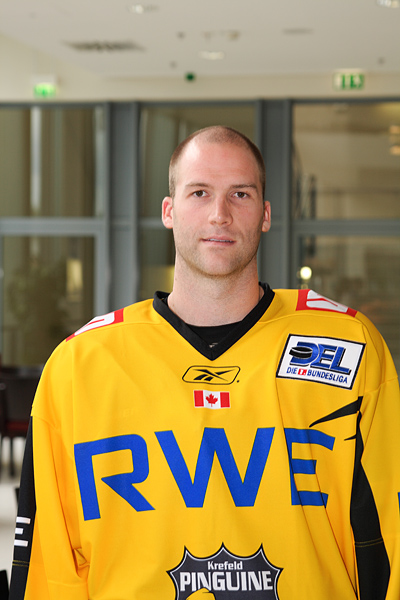
- Born: April 5, 1981 (age 45) London, Ontario, Canada
- Height: 6 ft 3 in (191 cm)
- Weight: 225 lb (102 kg; 16 st 1 lb)
- Position: Centre
- Shot: Right
- WOSHL team Former teams: Elora Rocks; Colorado Avalanche; DEG Metro Stars; Krefeld Pinguine; Kölner Haie
- NHL draft: 31st overall, 1999; Washington Capitals; 196th overall, 2001; Colorado Avalanche
- Playing career: 2002–2016

Charles Stephens (born April 5, 1981) is a Canadian former professional ice hockey forward currently playing with the senior men's club, the Elora Rocks, who compete in the Western Ontario Super Hockey League (WOSHL).

== Playing career ==
Stephens was highly rated as a young player and was selected first overall in the Ontario Hockey League entry draft, and attained national prominence for his role in the Esquire Swiss Watch company's advertising. He was selected in the second round of the 1999 NHL entry draft by the Washington Capitals, but did not sign with them and ultimately was re-drafted in 2001 by the Colorado Avalanche.

After a long OHL career with the Toronto St. Michael's Majors, Guelph Storm and London Knights, Stephens turned pro, but to date has only played 8 NHL games, all with Colorado. On January 23, 2004 Stephens was traded to the Ottawa Senators for Dennis Bonvie. However Stephens never played for the Senators spending most of his time with the Binghamton Senators.

For the season 2006–07 he signed a contract with the DEG Metro Stars of the Deutsche Eishockey Liga. In 2008, Stephens then signed for rivals the Krefeld Pinguine instantly becoming an integral part of the team.

After his third season with the Penguins, Stephens left as a free agent and signed a two-year contract to remain in Germany with Kölner Haie on April 12, 2011.

== Career statistics ==
=== Regular season and playoffs ===
			Regular season					Playoffs
Season	Team	League	GP	G	A	Pts	PIM	GP	G	A	Pts	PIM
1996–97	Leamington Flyers	WOHL	50	26	36	62	103	—	—	—	—	—
1997–98	Toronto St. Michael's Majors	OHL	58	9	21	30	38	—	—	—	—	—
1998–99	Toronto St. Michael's Majors	OHL	7	2	4	6	8	—	—	—	—	—
1998–99	Guelph Storm	OHL	61	24	28	52	72	11	3	5	8	19
1999–2000	Guelph Storm	OHL	56	16	34	50	87	6	1	3	4	15
2000–01	Guelph Storm	OHL	67	38	38	76	53	4	0	2	2	2
2001–02	Guelph Storm	OHL	4	1	2	3	2	—	—	—	—	—
2001–02	London Knights	OHL	56	23	33	56	55	12	6	10	16	18
2001–02	Hershey Bears	AHL	—	—	—	—	—	1	0	0	0	0
2002–03	Hershey Bears	AHL	74	17	33	50	38	5	1	1	2	2
2002–03	Colorado Avalanche	NHL	2	0	0	0	0	—	—	—	—	—
2003–04	Hershey Bears	AHL	32	5	9	14	21	—	—	—	—	—
2003–04	Colorado Avalanche	NHL	6	0	2	2	4	—	—	—	—	—
2003–04	Quad City Mallards	UHL	7	0	1	1	0	—	—	—	—	—
2003–04	Binghamton Senators	AHL	37	15	17	32	43	2	0	0	0	0
2004–05	Binghamton Senators	AHL	80	7	21	28	64	6	3	0	3	19
2005–06	Binghamton Senators	AHL	80	23	44	67	72	—	—	—	—	—
2006–07	DEG Metro Stars	DEL	46	14	20	34	130	8	2	4	6	30
2007–08	DEG Metro Stars	DEL	54	7	17	24	89	6	0	0	0	0
2008–09	Krefeld Pinguine	DEL	51	20	38	58	72	7	2	2	4	8
2009–10	Krefeld Pinguine	DEL	54	24	24	48	93	—	—	—	—	—
2010–11	Krefeld Pinguine	DEL	51	14	18	32	28	8	2	4	6	8
2011–12	Kölner Haie	DEL	51	11	20	31	108	6	0	0	0	10
2012–13	Kölner Haie	DEL	52	16	25	41	72	12	3	8	11	12
2013–14	Kölner Haie	DEL	41	10	16	26	22	5	0	1	1	4
2014–15	Kölner Haie	DEL	50	8	14	22	78	—	—	—	—	—
2015–16	Kölner Haie	DEL	49	2	2	4	16	10	1	0	1	20
2016–17	Brantford Blast	ACH	17	17	19	36	0	2	0	2	2	2
2017–18	Brantford Blast	ACH	12	6	15	21	6	—	—	—	—	—
2018–19	Dundas Real McCoys	ACH	9	7	3	10	0	4	0	2	2	2
2019–20	Dundas Real McCoys	ACH	6	2	4	6	0	1	0	0	0	0
2021–22	Elora Rocks	WOSHL	5	4	7	11	2	4	5	2	7	2
2022–23	Elora Rocks	WOSHL	8	5	7	12	2	3	2	2	4	0
2023–24	Elora Rocks	WOSHL	6	3	5	8	0	3	2	5	7	4
NHL totals			8	0	2	2	4	—	—	—	—	—
DEL totals			499	126	195	321	708	66	10	21	31	94

=== International ===
Year	Team	Event	GP	G	A	Pts	PIM
1999	Canada	U18	3	3	4	7	0
Junior totals			3	3	4	7	0
