= Ivan Novoseltsev =

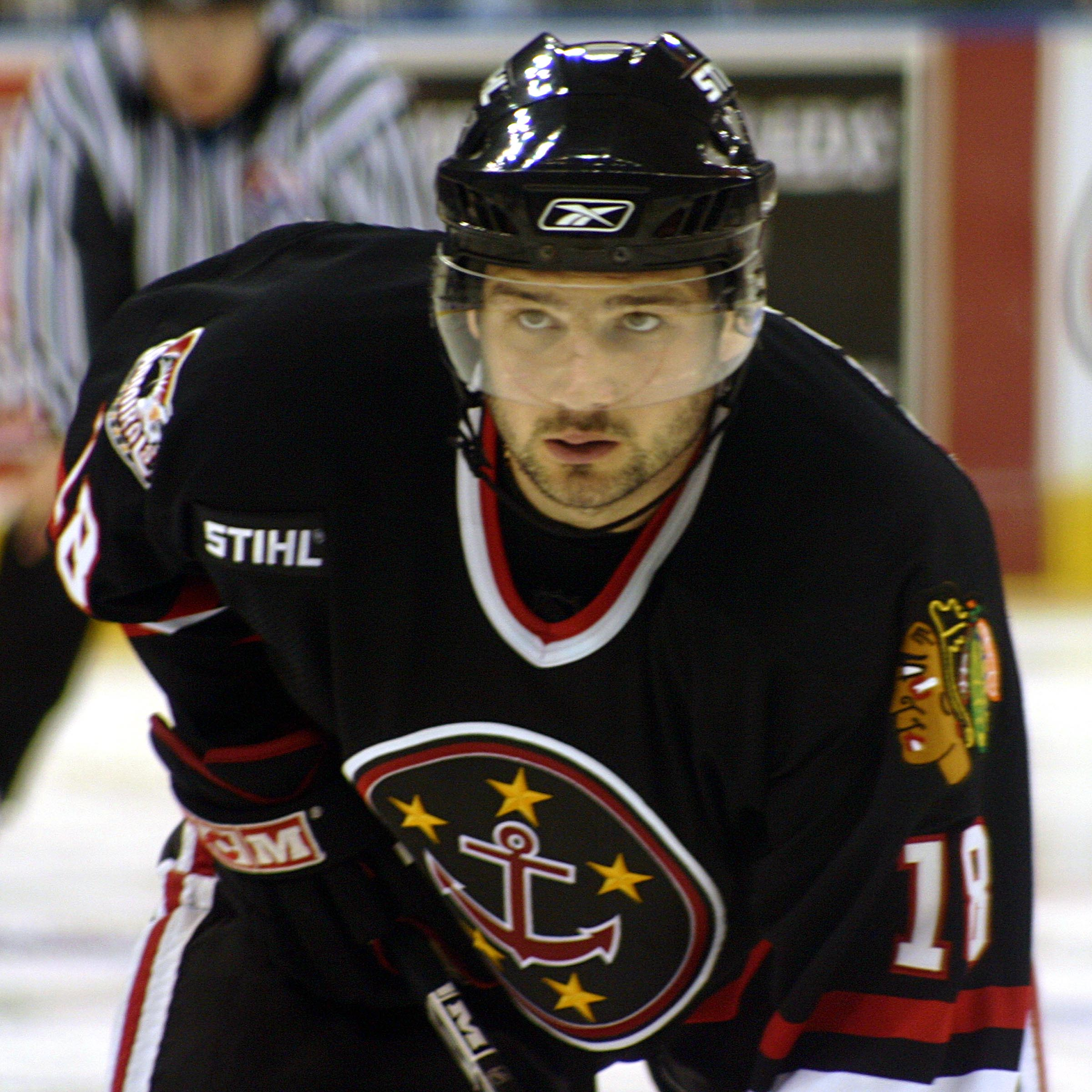
- Novoseltsev with the Norfolk Admirals in 2006
- Born: 23 January 1979 (age 47) Golitsyno, Soviet Union
- Height: 6 ft 0 in (183 cm)
- Weight: 183 lb (83 kg; 13 st 1 lb)
- Position: Winger
- Shot: Left
- Played for: Krylia Sovetov Moscow; Florida Panthers; Phoenix Coyotes; Lada Togliatti; Spartak Moscow; Amur Khabarovsk; Traktor Chelyabinsk; Khimik Voskresensk
- National team: Russia
- NHL draft: 95th overall, 1997; Florida Panthers
- Playing career: 1996–2010

Ivan Petrovich Novoseltsev (Russian Иван Петрович Новосельцев) (born January 23, 1979) is a Russian former professional ice hockey winger. He is the uncle of Vladislav Namestnikov.

== Playing career ==
As a youth, Novoseltsev played in the 1993 Quebec International Pee-Wee Hockey Tournament with a team from Moscow.

Novoseltsev was drafted in the fourth round, 95th overall, by the Florida Panthers in the 1997 NHL entry draft. Drafted from the Russian Superleague's Krylya Sovetov Moscow, Novoseltsev made his North American debut with the Sarnia Sting of the Ontario Hockey League during the 1997–98 season. In the 1998–99 OHL season, he finished with 96 points to rank in the league's top ten in scoring.

Novoseltsev made his National Hockey League debut with the Panthers during the 1999–2000 season and spent parts of five seasons with the team. During the 2003–04 season he was traded to the Phoenix Coyotes, where he scored two goals in seventeen games. During the 2004-05 NHL lockout, Novoseltsev split time between HC Spartak Moscow and Lada Togliatti.

Novoseltsev played four games for the American Hockey League's Norfolk Admirals early in the 2006–07 season before returning to Russia again to play for Amur Khabarovsk.

Novoseltsev joined Khimik Voskresensk in 2009, playing 29 games with the team. He remained with the team during the 2009–10 season (as the team was relegated to the second-tier Vysshaya Liga due to financial concerns), scoring five goals and ten points in 40 games. Novoseltsev retired after the 2009-10 MHL season.

== Career statistics ==
=== Regular season and playoffs ===
			Regular season					Playoffs
Season	Team	League	GP	G	A	Pts	PIM	GP	G	A	Pts	PIM
1995–96	Krylia Sovetov Moscow	IHL	1	0	0	0	2	—	—	—	—	—
1995–96	Krylia Sovetov–2 Moscow	RUS.2	43	8	5	13	22	—	—	—	—	—
1996–97	Krylia Sovetov Moscow	RSL	30	0	3	3	18	2	0	0	0	4
1996–97	Krylia Sovetov–2 Moscow	RUS.2	20	5	3	8	39	—	—	—	—	—
1997–98	Sarnia Sting	OHL	53	26	22	48	41	5	1	1	2	6
1998–99	Sarnia Sting	OHL	68	57	39	96	45	5	2	4	6	6
1999–2000	Florida Panthers	NHL	14	2	1	3	8	—	—	—	—	—
1999–2000	Louisville Panthers	AHL	47	14	21	35	22	4	1	0	1	6
2000–01	Florida Panthers	NHL	38	3	6	9	16	—	—	—	—	—
2000–01	Louisville Panthers	AHL	34	2	10	12	8	—	—	—	—	—
2001–02	Florida Panthers	NHL	70	13	16	29	44	—	—	—	—	—
2002–03	Florida Panthers	NHL	78	10	17	27	30	—	—	—	—	—
2003–04	Florida Panthers	NHL	17	1	4	5	8	—	—	—	—	—
2003–04	Phoenix Coyotes	NHL	17	2	0	2	6	—	—	—	—	—
2003–04	Springfield Falcons	AHL	2	1	0	1	2	—	—	—	—	—
2004–05	Lada Togliatti	RSL	13	0	2	2	8	—	—	—	—	—
2004–05	Lada–2 Togliatti	RUS.3	4	3	8	11	0	—	—	—	—	—
2004–05	Spartak Moskva	RSL	26	5	1	6	47	—	—	—	—	—
2005–06	Krylia Sovetov Moscow	RUS.2	8	0	1	1	2	—	—	—	—	—
2006–07	Norfolk Admirals	AHL	4	1	3	4	4	—	—	—	—	—
2006–07	Amur Khabarovsk	RSL	18	4	2	6	18	—	—	—	—	—
2006–07	Amur–2 Khabarovsk	RUS.3	1	0	0	0	0	—	—	—	—	—
2007–08	Amur Khabarovsk	RSL	23	0	3	3	10	—	—	—	—	—
2007–08	Traktor Chelyabinsk	RSL	21	3	3	6	47	2	0	0	0	6
2008–09	Krylia Sovetov Moscow	RUS.2	11	1	2	3	2	—	—	—	—	—
2008–09	Krylia Sovetov–2 Moscow	RUS.3	1	0	2	2	0	—	—	—	—	—
2008–09	Khimik Voskresensk	KHL	29	3	2	5	12	—	—	—	—	—
2009–10	Khimik Voskresensk	RUS.2	40	5	5	10	18	1	0	0	0	0
RSL totals			131	12	14	26	148	4	0	0	0	10
NHL totals			234	31	44	75	112	—	—	—	—	—

=== International ===
Year	Team	Event	Result	GP	G	A	Pts	PIM
1997	Russia	EJC	4th	6	2	3	5	4
2003	Russia	WC	5th	6	0	0	0	0
Junior totals				6	2	3	5	4
Senior totals				6	0	0	0	0
