= Harold Druken =

Canadian ice hockey player (born 1979)

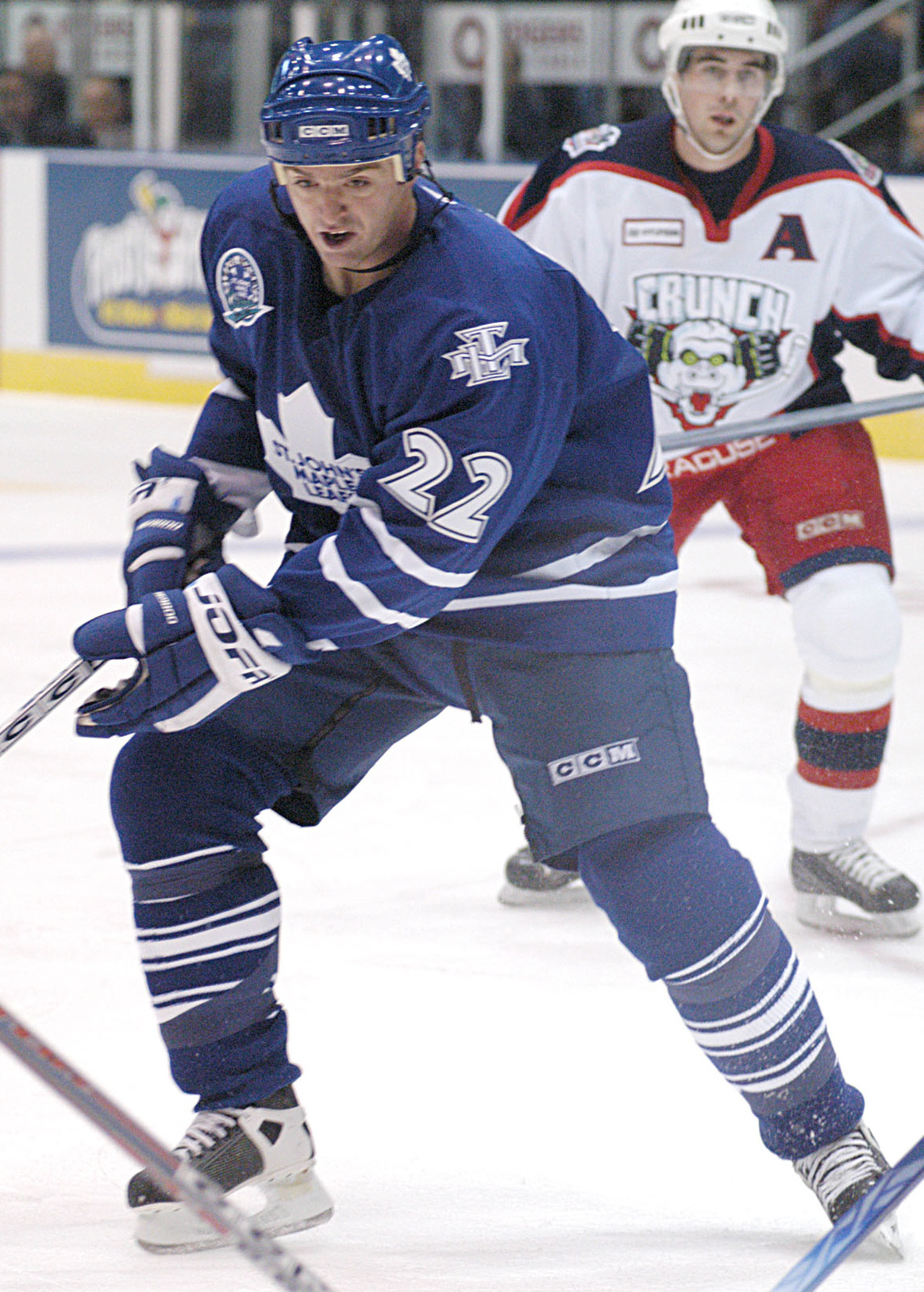
- Druken with the St. John's Maple Leafs in 2004
- Born: January 26, 1979 (age 47) St. John's, Newfoundland, Canada
- Height: 6 ft 0 in (183 cm)
- Weight: 200 lb (91 kg; 14 st 4 lb)
- Position: Centre
- Shot: Left
- Played for: Vancouver Canucks; Carolina Hurricanes; Toronto Maple Leafs; EHC Basel
- NHL draft: 36th overall, 1997; Vancouver Canucks
- Playing career: 1999–2010

Harold Druken (born January 26, 1979) is a Canadian former professional ice hockey centre. He was drafted 36th overall in the 1997 NHL entry draft by the Vancouver Canucks. He played for the Canucks, Carolina Hurricanes and Toronto Maple Leafs during his National Hockey League (NHL) career, and also played professionally in Switzerland for EHC Basel. Druken spent most of his professional career in the minor leagues with the American Hockey League (AHL) affiliates of the Canucks, Maple Leafs and Hurricanes.

== Playing career ==
Druken played high school hockey in the US for Noble & Greenough School in Dedham, MA. Druken enjoyed a prolific three-year Ontario Hockey League (OHL) career, spent with the Detroit/Plymouth Whalers franchise, during which time he was named to the OHL All-Rookie Team in 1997 and OHL Second All-Star Team in 1999. His most productive season in the OHL was a 58-goal, 103-point effort in 1998–99, which was good for seventh in league scoring. He represented Canada at the 1999 World Junior Ice Hockey Championships, where he won a silver medal and became lifelong friends with Roberto Luongo.

Druken was drafted by the Vancouver Canucks 36th overall in the 1997 NHL entry draft following his OHL rookie season. He turned professional in 1999–2000 and split the season between the Canucks and their American Hockey League (AHL) affiliate, the Syracuse Crunch. He scored 45 points in 47 games with the Crunch, earning him AHL All-Rookie honours, while also appearing in 33 games for Vancouver, scoring 7 goals.

The following season, Druken spent time with the Canucks' International Hockey League (IHL) affiliate, the Kansas City Blades, but spent the majority of the campaign with the Canucks, a season in which he appeared in an NHL career-high 55 games and scored 15 goals and 30 points, including a hat-trick on December 8, 2000, against the San Jose Sharks. Druken ended a 13-goal scoring drought late in the season when he scored two goals in a crucial game on April 5, 2001, against the Los Angeles Kings. He scored his second goal of the game just outside the lip of the crease to beat Félix Potvin in overtime, secure a 3–2 win and a Canucks' Stanley Cup playoff berth for the first time in five years. The Canucks finished the season as the eighth and final seed in the Western Conference and were swept in the opening round by the Colorado Avalanche. Druken contributed one assist in the series, the only NHL playoff appearance of his career.

Following Druken's breakout 30-point campaign of the previous season, he suffered an ankle injury on November 30, 2001, in a game against Colorado and missed the majority of the 2001–02 season. As a result, Druken appeared in just 27 games for the Canucks, scoring 8 points. He was also sent down during the season to the Canucks' new AHL affiliate, the Manitoba Moose, for 11 games, in which he produced at a point-per-game pace with two goals and nine assists.

The injury seemingly derailed Druken's NHL career as he was subsequently bounced around the NHL for the next several seasons in a series of transactions. On November 1, 2002, he was traded to the Carolina Hurricanes (along with forward Jan Hlaváč) in exchange for defenceman Marek Malík and forward Darren Langdon. On December 11, 2002, he was placed on waivers by the Hurricanes, after which he was picked up by the Toronto Maple Leafs. A month later, he was waived once again and was re-acquired by the Hurricanes on January 17, 2003. Druken played the remainder of the season for the Hurricanes' AHL affiliate, the Lowell Lock Monsters, then was traded back to the Maple Leafs in the off-season on May 29, 2003, in exchange for defenceman Allan Rourke. With the exception of nine games with the Maple Leafs in 2003–04, Druken spent the rest of his North American professional career in the minor leagues with the St. John's Maple Leafs with 51- and 38-point seasons in 2003–04 and 2004–05 respectively.

In 2005–06, Druken went overseas to Switzerland to play for EHC Basel of the Nationalliga A, but appeared in only 18 games, registering 10 points.

== Awards and achievements ==
- OHL All-Rookie Team (1997)
- OHL Second All-Star Team (1999)
- WJC Silver Medal (1999)
- AHL All-Rookie Team (2000)

== Career statistics ==
=== Regular season and playoffs ===
| | | | Regular season | | | | | Playoffs |
| Season | Team | League | GP | G | A | Pts | PIM | GP | G | A | Pts | PIM |
|---|---|---|---|---|---|---|---|---|---|---|---|---|
| 1996–97 | Detroit Whalers | OHL | 63 | 27 | 31 | 58 | 14 | 5 | 3 | 2 | 5 | 0 |
| 1997–98 | Plymouth Whalers | OHL | 64 | 38 | 44 | 82 | 12 | 15 | 9 | 11 | 20 | 4 |
| 1998–99 | Plymouth Whalers | OHL | 60 | 58 | 45 | 103 | 34 | 10 | 9 | 12 | 21 | 14 |
| 1999–00 | Syracuse Crunch | AHL | 47 | 20 | 25 | 45 | 32 | 4 | 1 | 2 | 3 | 6 |
| 1999–00 | Vancouver Canucks | NHL | 33 | 7 | 9 | 16 | 10 | — | — | — | — | — |
| 2000–01 | Kansas City Blades | IHL | 15 | 5 | 9 | 14 | 20 | — | — | — | — | — |
| 2000–01 | Vancouver Canucks | NHL | 55 | 15 | 15 | 30 | 14 | 4 | 0 | 1 | 1 | 0 |
| 2001–02 | Manitoba Moose | AHL | 11 | 2 | 9 | 11 | 4 | — | — | — | — | — |
| 2001–02 | Vancouver Canucks | NHL | 27 | 4 | 4 | 8 | 6 | — | — | — | — | — |
| 2002–03 | Lowell Lock Monsters | AHL | 24 | 8 | 10 | 18 | 8 | — | — | — | — | — |
| 2002–03 | St. John's Maple Leafs | AHL | 6 | 0 | 3 | 3 | 2 | — | — | — | — | — |
| 2002–03 | Vancouver Canucks | NHL | 3 | 1 | 1 | 2 | 0 | — | — | — | — | — |
| 2002–03 | Carolina Hurricanes | NHL | 14 | 0 | 1 | 1 | 2 | — | — | — | — | — |
| 2002–03 | Toronto Maple Leafs | NHL | 5 | 0 | 2 | 2 | 2 | — | — | — | — | — |
| 2003–04 | St. John's Maple Leafs | AHL | 57 | 26 | 25 | 51 | 31 | — | — | — | — | — |
| 2003–04 | Toronto Maple Leafs | NHL | 9 | 0 | 4 | 4 | 2 | — | — | — | — | — |
| 2004–05 | St. John's Maple Leafs | AHL | 48 | 18 | 20 | 38 | 28 | — | — | — | — | — |
| 2005–06 | EHC Basel | NLA | 18 | 6 | 4 | 10 | 34 | — | — | — | — | — |
| 2008–09 | Deer Lake Red Wings | NWCSHL | 24 | 16 | 28 | 44 | 18 | 13 | 7 | 13 | 20 | 12 |
| AHL totals | | | 193 | 74 | 92 | 166 | 105 | 4 | 1 | 2 | 3 | 6 |
| NHL totals | | | 146 | 27 | 36 | 63 | 36 | 4 | 0 | 1 | 1 | 0 |

=== International ===
Harold Druken
Medal record

Representing Canada

Ice hockey

World Junior Championships
| Silver medal – second place | 1999 Winnipeg | |

| Year | Team | Comp | GP | G | A | Pts | PIM |
|---|---|---|---|---|---|---|---|
| 1999 | Canada | WJC | 7 | 1 | 1 | 2 | 2 |
| Junior totals | | | 7 | 1 | 1 | 2 | 2 |
