= Eric Beaudoin =

Canadian ice hockey player (born 1980)

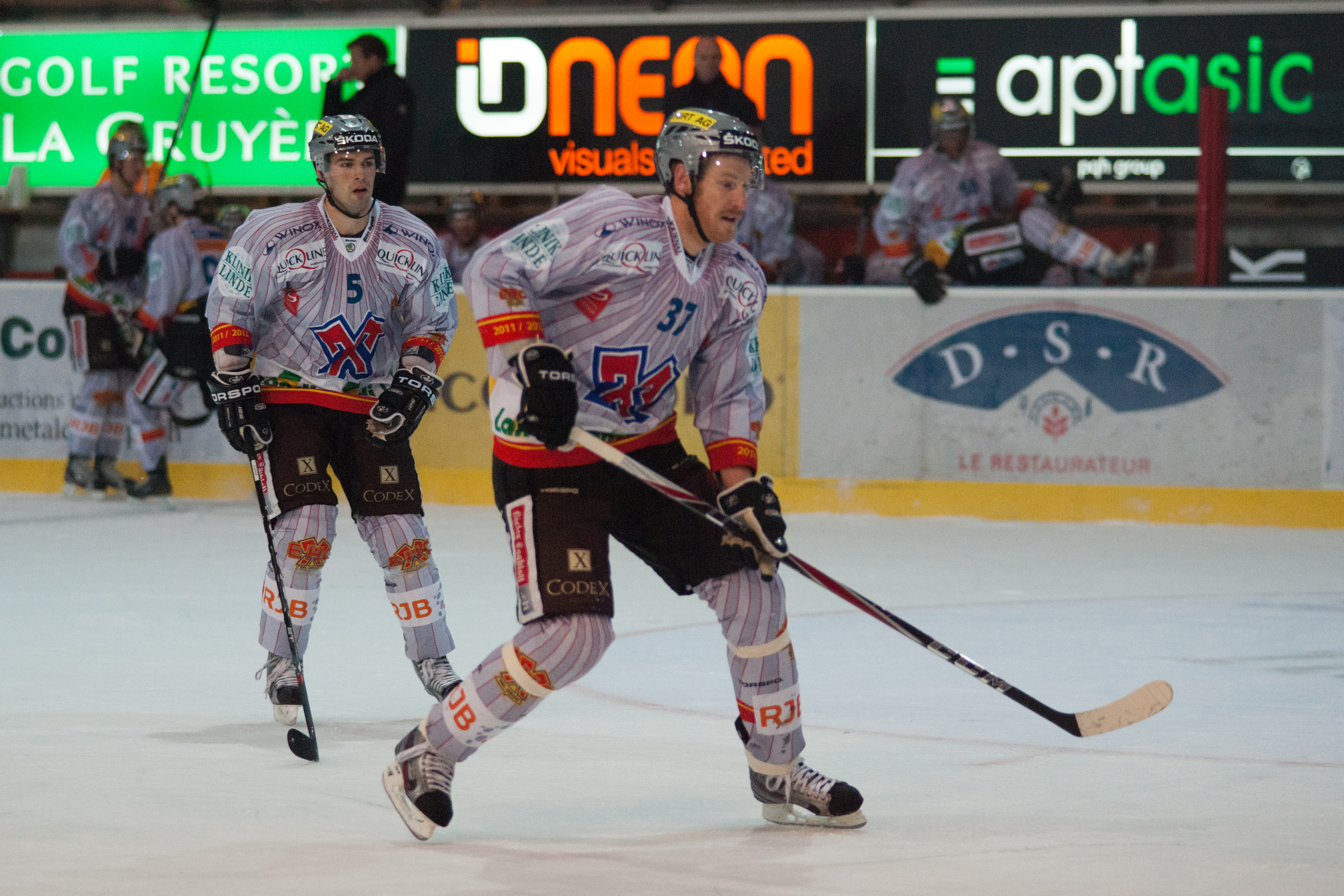
- Born: May 3, 1980 (age 46) Ottawa, Ontario, Canada
- Height: 6 ft 5 in (196 cm)
- Weight: 210 lb (95 kg; 15 st 0 lb)
- Position: Left wing
- Shot: Left
- Played for: Florida Panthers; Jokerit; HPK; Mora IK; Linköpings HC; Rögle BK; EHC Biel; Straubing Tigers; KHL Medveščak Zagreb
- NHL draft: 92nd overall, 1998; Tampa Bay Lightning
- Playing career: 2000–2016

Eric P. Beaudoin (born May 3, 1980) is a Canadian former professional ice hockey forward. He played in the National Hockey League with the Florida Panthers.

== Playing career ==
Born in Ottawa, Ontario, Beaudoin started his hockey career in the OHL. He was drafted by the Tampa Bay Lightning in the 1998 NHL entry draft. He has played for the Florida Panthers in the NHL as well as several AHL teams. In the fall of 2005, he signed with the Newcastle Vipers, but was released from his contract for a one-month tryout with Jokerit in the Finnish SM-liiga.

When he was not signed on after the tryout, Beaudoin agreed to a subsequent two-game tryout with HPK that also did not lead to a contract. Eventually Beaudoin agreed to a contract for the rest of the season with Ässät, but instead signed with Mora IK in the Swedish Elitserien. He stayed in Mora for three years before signing a one-year contract with Swedish top-team Linköpings HC. After concluding a one-year contract with Linköpings, in May 2009, he signed another one-year term contract with Rögle BK.

Upon completion of his contract with Rögle, Beaudoin opted to switch leagues and joined EHC Biel of the Swiss National League A.

Beaudoin enjoyed parts of three seasons with Biel, before joining as a free agent to sign with German club, Straubing Tigers of the DEL on June 23, 2013. After just 10 games with the Tigers, Beaudoin opted for a release from his contract to return to Biel.

In the 2014–15 season, Beaudoin signed an optional two-year contract with Croatian club, KHL Medveščak Zagreb of the KHL. He played in three games in Zagreb before suffering a season-ending injury.

In January 2016, as a free agent, he signed a deal in a return to Switzerland with NLB club, EHC Olten for the remainder of the 2015–16 season. When Olten sacked head coach Heikki Leime during the playoff semifinal series in March 2016, Beaudoin took on head coaching duties alongside sport director Jakob Kölliker on an interim basis.

== Personal ==
Eric's son Cole Beaudoin is an ice hockey forward with the New York Rangers.

== Career statistics ==
			Regular season					Playoffs
Season	Team	League	GP	G	A	Pts	PIM	GP	G	A	Pts	PIM
1997–98	Guelph Storm	OHL	62	9	13	22	43	12	3	2	5	4
1998–99	Guelph Storm	OHL	66	28	43	71	79	11	5	3	8	12
1999–00	Guelph Storm	OHL	68	38	34	72	126	6	3	0	3	2
2000–01	Louisville Panthers	AHL	71	15	10	25	78	—	—	—	—	—
2001–02	Utah Grizzlies	AHL	44	5	16	21	83	—	—	—	—	—
2001–02	Florida Panthers	NHL	8	1	3	4	4	—	—	—	—	—
2002–03	San Antonio Rampage	AHL	41	14	23	37	36	3	1	0	1	0
2002–03	Florida Panthers	NHL	15	0	1	1	25	—	—	—	—	—
2003–04	San Antonio Rampage	AHL	38	20	22	42	45	—	—	—	—	—
2003–04	Florida Panthers	NHL	30	2	4	6	12	—	—	—	—	—
2004–05	San Antonio Rampage	AHL	32	6	4	10	21	—	—	—	—	—
2004–05	Edmonton Roadrunners	AHL	24	3	1	4	9	—	—	—	—	—
2005–06	Newcastle Vipers	EIHL	7	1	6	7	14	—	—	—	—	—
2005–06	Jokerit	SM-l	11	1	2	3	14	—	—	—	—	—
2005–06	HPK	SM-l	2	0	1	1	4	—	—	—	—	—
2005–06	Mora IK	SEL	32	2	9	11	24	—	—	—	—	—
2006–07	Mora IK	SEL	55	14	12	26	64	4	2	0	2	6
2007–08	Mora IK	SEL	52	11	16	27	95	—	—	—	—	—
2008–09	Linköpings HC	SEL	53	16	7	23	53	7	2	0	2	4
2009–10	Rögle BK	SEL	55	14	20	34	59	—	—	—	—	—
2010–11	EHC Biel	NLA	8	5	2	7	2	—	—	—	—	—
2011–12	EHC Biel	NLA	50	11	12	23	20	5	3	2	5	2
2012–13	EHC Biel	NLA	30	10	6	16	26	7	3	3	6	2
2013–14	Straubing Tigers	DEL	10	0	5	5	8	—	—	—	—	—
2013–14	EHC Biel	NLA	24	10	8	18	16	—	—	—	—	—
2014–15	KHL Medveščak Zagreb	KHL	3	1	0	1	2	—	—	—	—	—
2015–16	EHC Olten	NLB	4	1	0	1	0	2	0	1	1	2
NHL totals			53	3	8	11	41	—	—	—	—	—
