= Justin Papineau =

Canadian ice hockey player

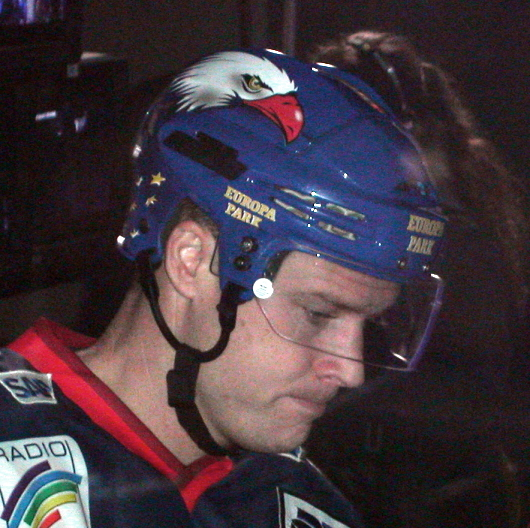
- Born: January 15, 1980 (age 46) Ottawa, Ontario, Canada
- Height: 5 ft 11 in (180 cm)
- Weight: 205 lb (93 kg; 14 st 9 lb)
- Position: Centre
- Shot: Left
- DEL team Former teams: Adler Mannheim; Grizzly Adams Wolfsburg (DEL); EHC Basel (Swiss A); Bridgeport Sound Tigers (AHL); New York Islanders; St. Louis Blues; Worcester IceCats (AHL); Belleville Bulls (OHL)
- NHL draft: 46th overall, 1998; Los Angeles Kings; 75th overall, 2000; St. Louis Blues
- Playing career: 2000–2011

Justin Papineau (born January 15, 1980) is a Canadian former professional ice hockey centre who last played for Adler Mannheim of the Deutsche Eishockey Liga in Germany until 2011. In the NHL, he played for the St. Louis Blues and the New York Islanders between 2001 and 2004.

== Career ==
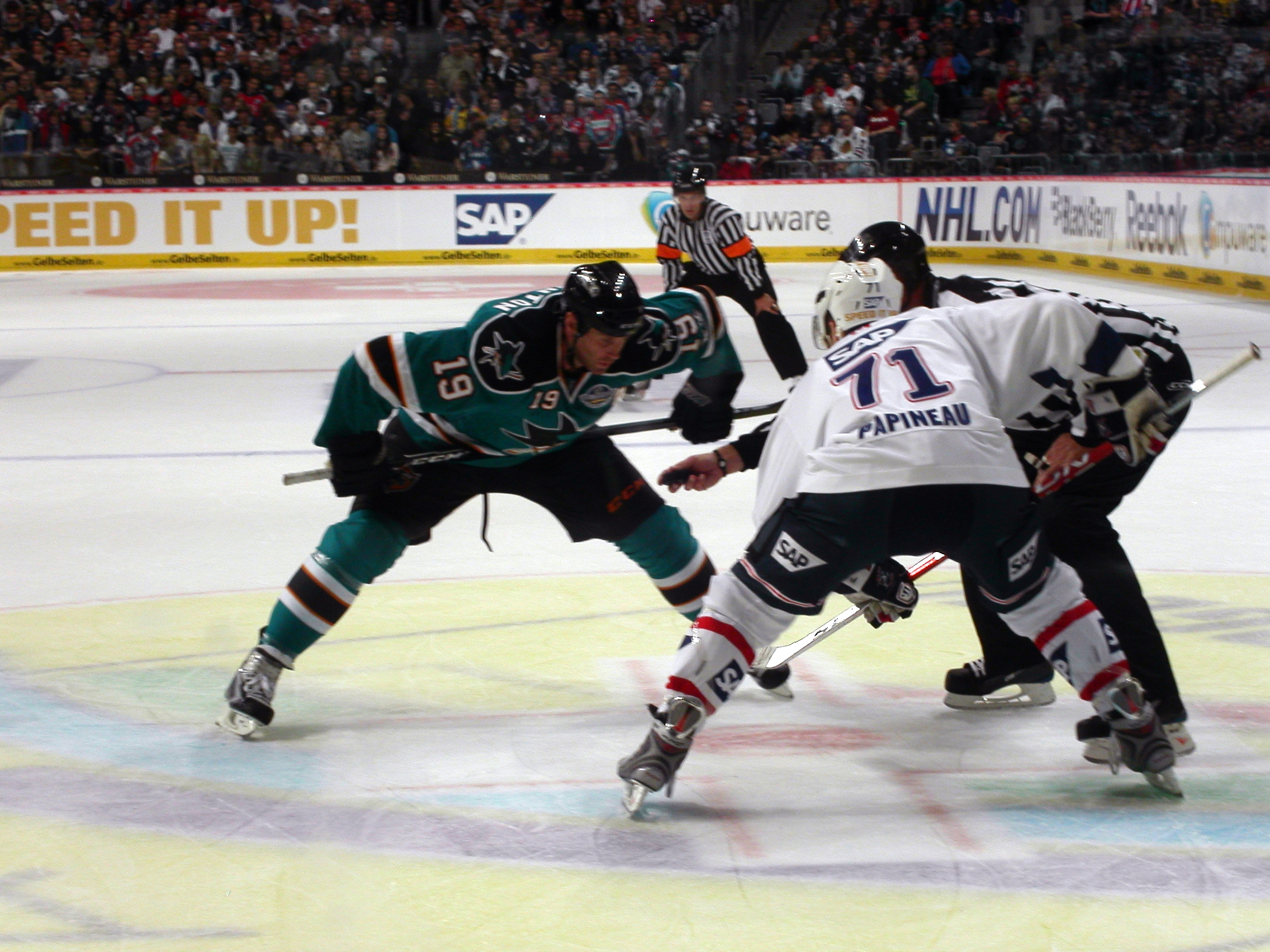
Justin Papineau (No. 71) and Joe Thornton

Papineau was born in Ottawa, Ontario. As a youth, he played in the 1994 Quebec International Pee-Wee Hockey Tournament with a minor ice hockey team from South Ottawa. In 1998-99 with the Belleville Bulls, he set the OHL playoff record for most points in a single post-season with 51. He was drafted in the second round, #46 overall by the Los Angeles Kings in the 1998 NHL entry draft.

He was then re-selected in the third round, #75 overall by the St. Louis Blues in the 2000 NHL entry draft when the Kings were unable to sign him to a contract within the two-year deadline and retain his rights. It was reported that negotiations between the team's front office and Papineau broke down at least partially due to the involvement an overbearing agent demanding a huge entry contract.

Papineau has played 81 career NHL games for the Blues and New York Islanders, scoring 11 goals and 8 assists for 19 points. Papineau was once compared to star Steve Yzerman, but those comparisons never came to fruition at the NHL level. He left then on 6 April 2009 EHC Wolfsburg Grizzly Adams to sign with Adler Mannheim.

== Career statistics ==
			Regular season					Playoffs
Season	Team	League	GP	G	A	Pts	PIM	GP	G	A	Pts	PIM
1995–96	Ottawa Jr. Senators	CJHL	52	31	19	50	51	—	—	—	—	—
1996–97	Belleville Bulls	OHL	50	10	32	42	32	—	—	—	—	—
1997–98	Belleville Bulls	OHL	66	41	53	94	34	10	5	9	14	6
1998–99	Belleville Bulls	OHL	68	52	47	99	28	21	21	30	51	20
1999–2000	Belleville Bulls	OHL	60	40	36	76	52	16	4	12	16	16
2000–01	Worcester IceCats	AHL	43	7	22	29	33	11	7	3	10	8
2001–02	St. Louis Blues	NHL	1	0	0	0	0	—	—	—	—	—
2001–02	Worcester IceCats	AHL	75	38	38	76	86	3	1	2	3	4
2002–03	St. Louis Blues	NHL	11	2	1	3	0	—	—	—	—	—
2002–03	Worcester IceCats	AHL	44	21	17	38	42	—	—	—	—	—
2002–03	New York Islanders	NHL	5	1	2	3	4	1	0	0	0	0
2002–03	Bridgeport Sound Tigers	AHL	5	7	1	8	4	7	1	3	4	7
2003–04	New York Islanders	NHL	64	8	5	13	8	—	—	—	—	—
2004–05	Bridgeport Sound Tigers	AHL	59	18	16	34	52	—	—	—	—	—
2005–06	Bridgeport Sound Tigers	AHL	12	6	6	12	12	5	1	3	4	4
2006–07	Lowell Devils	AHL	29	12	17	29	24	—	—	—	—	—
2007–08	EHC Basel	NLA	41	6	22	28	40	—	—	—	—	—
2008–09	Grizzly Adams Wolfsburg	DEL	49	21	34	55	58	10	0	3	3	8
2009–10	Adler Mannheim	DEL	51	19	25	44	38	2	1	1	2	0
2010–11	Adler Mannheim	DEL	13	4	4	8	6	—	—	—	—	—
AHL totals			267	109	117	226	253	26	10	11	21	23
NHL totals			81	11	8	19	12	1	0	0	0	0
DEL totals			113	44	63	107	102	12	1	4	5	8
