= Derek Campbell =

Canadian ice hockey player

- Born: April 14, 1980 (age 46) Nepean, Ontario, Canada
- Height: 6 ft 1 in (185 cm)
- Weight: 205 lb (93 kg; 14 st 9 lb)
- Position: Left wing
- Shot: Right
- EIHL team Former teams: Free Agent; Manchester Phoenix; Newcastle Vipers; Coventry Blaze; Sheffield Steelers; Hull Stingrays
- Playing career: 1997–2013

Derek Campbell (born April 14, 1980) is a former Canadian professional ice hockey player.

== Career ==
Born in Nepean, Ontario, Campbell began his career playing for the junior OHL team, the Belleville Bulls. Campbell spent two seasons as a Bulls player, appearing in almost 150 games, scoring 73 points. For the 1999/00 season, Campbell signed for the Owen Sound Platers, another OHL team. Campbell would only stay one season, but in 55 games would manage a ratio of close to one point per game. He would also play for the Fort Wayne Komets on ten occasions, totalling eight UHL points.

For the following season, Campbell would continue at junior level, this time with the Kingston Frontenacs. In 61 games, he would manage an impressive 72 points, his best total yet. Campbell would start his college career in the 2001/02 season, turning out for St. Thomas University of New Brunswick. In his three University seasons, Campbell played in 78 games and scored 89 points, with 239 penalty minutes.

When his University level career came to an end in the 2003/04 season, Campbell took the opportunity to sign with an AHL team, the Binghamton Senators, the affiliate team of the well-known NHL Ottawa Senators. Campbell's opportunities were limited however, and he made just three appearances for the Binghamton team all season. For the 2004/05 term, Campbell would be dropped down to UHL level, playing for the Elmira Jackals 58 times, but managing just 18 points. In the same season, Campbell would play for Binghamton for a second time, but again managed just three appearances.

For the 2005/06 season, Campbell changed clubs to sign for the Houston Aeros, a team affiliated with the Minnesota Wild. He would again struggle to make regular AHL appearances, managing just two for his new team. Campbell would split the rest of the season between two ECHL teams, the Stockton Thunder and the Columbia Inferno, and despite a solid points output failed to settle at either.

In the summer of 2006, Campbell would move to Europe to play for the Manchester Phoenix under player/coach Tony Hand. At the time Phoenix played at EIHL level, the highest standard of club ice hockey in Britain. In 59 regular season games, he managed 71 points as well as 224 penalty minutes.

After his season in Manchester, Campbell decided to again move teams. He would stay in the EIHL though, signing for the Newcastle Vipers. A second strong season would follow, and Campbell managed to total over a point per game throughout the regular season, with 66 points in 64 games. This productivity encouraged Newcastle head coach Rob Wilson to re-sign Campbell for the Vipers, and a deal which was announced in June 2008. A second high-scoring season for the Vipers would follow, taking Campbell to a total of 187 points in 178 EIHL games. His proven Elite League record convinced Paul Thompson to sign Campbell for the Coventry Blaze in the summer of 2009.

After spending the 2010/11 season with the Sheffield Steelers, Campbell once again moved on within the EIHL, signing with the Hull Stingrays for 2011/12.

Derek started playing his 2012/13 season back in Sheffield with the Sheffield Steeldogs in the EPL.

On October 6, 2013, while playing for the Hull Stingrays, Campbell was involved in a fight on the ice that saw him ejected from the game for driving an opponent's head to the ice. Shortly afterwards, he was seen outside of the opponent's dressing room, where he attacked another player from the opposing team. He was restrained by fans and led back to his dressing room. Three days later, the Stingrays released Campbell from his contract. Later that same day, he was suspended by the league for 47 games; 15 for fighting off the ice, 12 for an attempted eye gouge, 10 for a knee to the head and 10 for excessive force to the head resulting in an impact to the ice.
