= Joel Scherban =

Canadian ice hockey player

- Born: April 22, 1980 (age 46) Thunder Bay, Ontario, Canada
- Height: 6 ft 2 in (188 cm)
- Weight: 207 lb (94 kg; 14 st 11 lb)
- Position: Centre
- Shot: Left
- Played for: OHL; London Knights; CIS; Lakehead University
- NHL draft: 196th overall, 1998; Pittsburgh Penguins
- Playing career: 1996–2006

Joel Scherban (born April 22, 1980) is a Canadian former ice hockey player who was selected by the Pittsburgh Penguins in the 7th round (196th overall) of the 1998 NHL entry draft.

== Career ==
=== Player ===
After spending four years with the OHL's London Knights, Scherban continued his playing career with the Lakehead Thunderwolves, where he held the captaincy for five seasons. Scherban remained with the club until 2005-06, where he finished as the club's all-time leader in points (179).

=== Coaching ===
Scherban coached the CIS Lakehead Thunderwolves men's ice hockey team at Lakehead University, a position he has held from 2009 until four games into the 2012-13 season when he was relieved of his duties and replaced on an interim basis by former Philadelphia Flyers defenceman Mike Busniuk.

== Awards and honours ==
Award	Year
Senator Joseph A. Sullivan Trophy - CIS Player of the year	2004–05
