= Chad Woollard =

Canadian ice hockey player

- Born: September 18, 1979 (age 46) Durham, Ontario, Canada
- Height: 6 ft 3 in (191 cm)
- Weight: 210 lb (95 kg; 15 st 0 lb)
- Position: Winger
- Shot: Left
- Played for: Utah Grizzlies; St. John's Maple Leafs; San Antonio Rampage
- NHL draft: Undrafted
- Playing career: 2000–2013

Chad Woollard (born September 18, 1979) is a Canadian former professional ice hockey Winger who last played for the Fort Worth Brahmas in the Central Hockey League (CHL). He previously played in the American Hockey League (AHL) with the Utah Grizzlies, St. John's Maple Leafs and the San Antonio Rampage.

== Career statistics ==
| | | | Regular season | | | | | Playoffs |
| Season | Team | League | GP | G | A | Pts | PIM | GP | G | A | Pts | PIM |
|---|---|---|---|---|---|---|---|---|---|---|---|---|
| 1996–97 | Sault Ste. Marie Greyhounds | OHL | 43 | 4 | 5 | 9 | 66 | 11 | 1 | 3 | 4 | 11 |
| 1997–98 | Sault Ste. Marie Greyhounds | OHL | 34 | 3 | 9 | 12 | 79 | — | — | — | — | — |
| 1998–99 | Owen Sound Platers | OHL | 50 | 28 | 29 | 57 | 79 | 15 | 2 | 9 | 11 | 22 |
| 1999–00 | Toronto St. Michael's Majors | OHL | 26 | 13 | 10 | 23 | 31 | — | — | — | — | — |
| 1999–00 | Jackson Bandits | ECHL | 17 | 3 | 4 | 7 | 17 | — | — | — | — | — |
| 1999–00 | Greensboro Generals | ECHL | 15 | 3 | 4 | 7 | 8 | — | — | — | — | — |
| 2000–01 | Fort Worth Brahmas | WPHL | 60 | 18 | 26 | 44 | 83 | — | — | — | — | — |
| 2001–02 | Fort Worth Brahmas | CHL | 53 | 21 | 27 | 48 | 188 | 4 | 2 | 1 | 3 | 4 |
| 2001–02 | Utah Grizzlies | AHL | 2 | 0 | 0 | 0 | 5 | — | — | — | — | — |
| 2002–03 | Fort Worth Brahmas | CHL | 60 | 35 | 24 | 59 | 182 | — | — | — | — | — |
| 2003–04 | Fort Worth Brahmas | CHL | 57 | 18 | 20 | 38 | 106 | — | — | — | — | — |
| 2003–04 | St. John's Maple Leafs | AHL | 4 | 1 | 0 | 1 | 4 | — | — | — | — | — |
| 2004–05 | Fort Worth Brahmas | CHL | 60 | 40 | 35 | 75 | 127 | — | — | — | — | — |
| 2005–06 | Quad City Mallards | UHL | 76 | 44 | 32 | 76 | 123 | 7 | 8 | 4 | 12 | 4 |
| 2006–07 | Quad City Mallards | UHL | 69 | 35 | 47 | 82 | 108 | 5 | 3 | 3 | 6 | 36 |
| 2006–07 | San Antonio Rampage | AHL | 2 | 0 | 0 | 0 | 0 | — | — | — | — | — |
| 2007–08 | Mississippi RiverKings | CHL | 60 | 37 | 31 | 68 | 84 | 3 | 2 | 0 | 2 | 2 |
| 2008–09 | Muskegon Lumberjacks | IHL | 50 | 33 | 24 | 57 | 69 | 10 | 2 | 4 | 6 | 8 |
| 2009–10 | Corpus Christi IceRays | CHL | 57 | 40 | 24 | 64 | 72 | 2 | 1 | 2 | 3 | 2 |
| 2010–11 | Texas Brahmas | CHL | 65 | 46 | 46 | 92 | 89 | 4 | 1 | 2 | 3 | 12 |
| 2011–12 | Texas Brahmas | CHL | 62 | 26 | 34 | 60 | 42 | 12 | 0 | 7 | 7 | 6 |
| 2012–13 | Fort Worth Brahmas | CHL | 36 | 14 | 13 | 27 | 41 | — | — | — | — | — |
| CHL totals | | | 510 | 277 | 254 | 531 | 931 | 25 | 6 | 12 | 18 | 26 |

== Awards and honours ==
| Award | Year |
|---|---|
CHL
| All-CHL Team | 2010–11 |
