= 1997–98 OHL season =

Junior ice hockey season

The 1997–98 OHL season was the 18th season of the Ontario Hockey League. The Toronto St. Michael's Majors name was reactivated when they are awarded a franchise, to play in the east division. The Detroit Whalers became the Plymouth Whalers. Eighteen teams each played 66 games. The Guelph Storm won the J. Ross Robertson Cup, defeating the Ottawa 67's.

== Expansion ==
=== Toronto St. Michael's Majors ===
On August 15, 1996, the Ontario Hockey League announced that the Toronto St. Michael's Majors would join the league as an expansion team, beginning in the 1997–98 season. The Majors would play their home games at Maple Leaf Gardens, in which they shared the arena with the Toronto Maple Leafs of the National Hockey League. The Majors would join the East Division.

Previously, the Toronto St. Michael's Majors were a junior hockey franchise from 1906 to 1962, as they ceased operations at the conclusion of the 1961–62 season. The Majors won the Memorial Cup in 1934, 1945, 1947 and 1961.

The Majors were the first OHL franchise based out of Toronto in eight years, as their previous franchise, the Toronto Marlboros, relocated to Hamilton following the 1988-89 season.

== Rebranding ==
=== Detroit Whalers to Plymouth Whalers ===
The Detroit Whalers rebranded their team as the Plymouth Whalers during the summer of 1997. The Whalers franchise moved to the Compuware Sports Arena in 1996-97, which is located in Plymouth. The team would retain their current team name and uniforms.

== Realignment ==
The newest Ontario Hockey League club, the Toronto St. Michael's Majors, joined the East Division. Due to the Majors joining the East, the OHL moved the North Bay Centennials from the East Division to the Central Division, while the Erie Otters moved from the Central Division to the West Division. This created three six-team divisions in the 18 team league.

== Regular season ==
=== Final standings ===
Note: DIV = Division; GP = Games played; W = Wins; L = Losses; T = Ties; OTL = Overtime losses; GF = Goals for; GA = Goals against; PTS = Points; x = clinched playoff berth; y = clinched division title; z = earned first round bye

=== East Division ===
Rank	Team	GP	W	L	T	PTS	GF	GA
1	z-Ottawa 67's	66	40	17	9	89	286	172
2	x-Belleville Bulls	66	41	22	3	85	315	239
3	x-Kingston Frontenacs	66	35	27	4	74	330	275
4	x-Oshawa Generals	66	26	32	8	60	214	247
5	x-Peterborough Petes	66	20	36	10	50	212	273
6	Toronto St. Michael's Majors	66	15	42	9	39	154	265

=== Central Division ===
Rank	Team	GP	W	L	T	PTS	GF	GA
1	z-Guelph Storm	66	42	18	6	90	263	189
2	x-Barrie Colts	66	38	23	5	81	236	215
3	x-Kitchener Rangers	66	27	29	10	64	224	239
4	x-Owen Sound Platers	66	27	34	5	59	270	312
5	x-Sudbury Wolves	66	25	34	7	57	257	268
6	North Bay Centennials	66	15	45	6	36	213	291

=== West Division ===
Rank	Team	GP	W	L	T	PTS	GF	GA
1	y-London Knights	66	40	21	5	85	301	238
2	x-Plymouth Whalers	66	37	22	7	81	279	223
3	x-Sarnia Sting	66	32	21	13	77	253	227
4	x-Erie Otters	66	33	28	5	71	261	252
5	Sault Ste. Marie Greyhounds	66	20	39	7	47	232	296
6	Windsor Spitfires	66	19	42	5	43	261	340

=== Scoring leaders ===
Note: GP = Games played; G = Goals; A = Assists; Pts = Points; PIM = Penalty minutes

Player	Team	GP	G	A	Pts	PIM
Peter Sarno	Windsor Spitfires	64	33	88	121	18
Jeremy Adduono	Sudbury Wolves	66	37	69	106	40
David Legwand	Plymouth Whalers	59	54	51	105	56
Maxim Spiridonov	London Knights	66	54	44	98	52
Colin Chaulk	Kingston Frontenacs	60	34	52	96	118
Rob Mailloux	Kingston Frontenacs	65	55	40	95	53
Jay Legault	London Knights	61	39	56	95	87
Chris Allen	Kingston Frontenacs	66	38	57	95	91
Jon Sim	Sarnia Sting	59	44	50	94	95
Justin Papineau	Belleville Bulls	66	41	53	94	34

=== Leading goaltenders ===
Note: GP = Games played; Mins = Minutes played; W = Wins; L = Losses: OTL = Overtime losses;
SL = Shootout losses; GA = Goals Allowed; SO = Shutouts; GAA = Goals against average

Player	Team	GP	Mins	W	L	T	GA	SO	Sv%	GAA
Craig Hillier	Ottawa 67's	46	2587	27	12	4	108	5	0.913	2.50
Chris Madden	Guelph Storm	51	2906	33	11	3	132	4	0.917	2.73
Robert Esche	Plymouth Whalers	48	2810	29	13	4	135	3	0.906	2.88
Mike Gorman	Kitchener Rangers	42	2136	15	13	5	104	1	0.924	2.92
Brian Finley	Barrie Colts	41	2154	23	14	1	105	3	0.917	2.92

== Playoffs ==
Division quarterfinals
C1	Guelph	bye
C2	Barrie	2
C5	Sudbury	4
E2	Belleville	4
E5	Peterborough	0
W2	Plymouth	4
W3	Sarnia	1
E1	Ottawa	bye
C3	Kitchener	2
C4	Owen Sound	4
W1	London	4
W4	Erie	3
E3	Kingston	4
E4	Oshawa	3

Quarterfinals
C1	Guelph	4
C5	Sudbury	0
E2	Belleville	2
W2	Plymouth	4
E1	Ottawa	4
C4	Owen Sound	1
W1	London	4
E3	Kingston	1

Semifinals
C1	Guelph	4
W2	Plymouth	0
E1	Ottawa	4
W1	London	0

Finals
C1	Guelph	4
E1	Ottawa	1

=== Division quarter-finals ===
==== East Division ====
===== (2) Belleville Bulls vs. (5) Peterborough Petes =====
March 14	Peterborough Petes	0 – 10	Belleville Bulls	Yardmen Arena	Recap
No scoring		First period	5:56 - sh - Randy Rowe (1); 8:03 - Kevin Baker (1); 8:27 - Jim Midgley (1); 12:35 - Steve Gallace; 14:36 - Justin Papineau (1); 18:03 - pp - Jeff Scharf (1)
No scoring		Second period	8:43 - pp - Justin Papineau (2); 18:48 - pp - Kevin Baker (2)
No scoring		Third period	12:20 - pp - Andrei Shurupov (1); 19:26 - pp - Ryan Ready (1)
Josh Evans (0 – 1, 6 saves / 9 shots); Mark Cairns (47 saves / 54 shots)		Goalie stats	Shawn Gallant (1 – 0, 26 saves / 26 shots)

March 15	Belleville Bulls	5 – 1	Peterborough Petes	Peterborough Memorial Centre	Recap
Ryan Ready (2) - 10:01		First period	No scoring
Daniel Cleary (1) - pp - 0:59; Steve Gallace (2) - 6:32		Second period	No scoring
Ryan Ready (3) - 0:15; Jim Midgley (2) - sh - 3:49		Third period	15:27 - sh - Scott Barney (1)
Shawn Gallant (2 – 0, 21 saves / 22 shots)		Goalie stats	Mark Cairns (0 – 1, 39 saves / 44 shots)

March 17	Peterborough Petes	0 – 8	Belleville Bulls	Yardmen Arena	Recap
No scoring		First period	0:21 - Ryan Ready (4); 8:58 - pp - Justin Papineau (3); 16:55 - pp - Jonathan Cheechoo (1)
No scoring		Second period	5:52 - Daniel Cleary (2); 7:00 - Jeff Scharf (2); 7:23 - Jeff Scharf (3)
No scoring		Third period	0:57 - Joel Dezainde (1); 15:45 - Daniel Cleary (3)
Mark Cairns (0 – 2, 6 saves / 8 shots); Chad Lynch (47 saves / 53 shots)		Goalie stats	Shawn Gallant (3 – 0, 23 saves / 23 shots)

March 18	Belleville Bulls	7 – 4	Peterborough Petes	Peterborough Memorial Centre	Recap
Derek Campbell (1) - 4:48; Chris Stanley (1) - 18:52		First period	5:22 - Pat Kavanagh (1); 8:13 - pp - Duncan Dalmao (1)
Kevin Baker (3) - 3:59; Joel Trottier (1) - pp - 7:39; Joel Dezainde (2) - pp - 11:23		Second period	5:09 - pp - Duncan Dalmao (2)
Chris Stanley (2) - 1:06; Daniel Cleary (4) - pp - en - 19:04		Third period	2:42 - Robert Francz (1)
Shawn Gallant (4 – 0, 31 saves / 35 shots)		Goalie stats	Chad Lynch (0 – 1, 40 saves / 46 shots)

Belleville wins series 4 – 0

===== (3) Kingston Frontenacs vs. (4) Oshawa Generals =====
March 15	Oshawa Generals	2 – 3	OT	Kingston Frontenacs	Kingston Memorial Centre	Recap
No scoring		First period		2:32 - Colin Chaulk (1); 4:42 - Mike Oliveira (1)
Brandon Coalter (1) - sh - 7:50; Brad Ralph (1) - pp - 13:25		Second period		No scoring
No scoring		Third period		No scoring
No scoring		First overtime period		1:34 - Matt Price (1)
Tyrone Garner (0 – 1, 30 saves / 33 shots)		Goalie stats		Curtis Cruickshank (1 – 0, 27 saves / 29 shots)

March 17	Kingston Frontenacs	3 – 2	Oshawa Generals	Oshawa Civic Auditorium	Recap
No scoring		First period	No scoring
Jan Bulis (1) - 5:03; Mike Oliveira (2) - 11:30; Aaron Fransen (1) - pp - 18:54		Second period	No scoring
No scoring		Third period	3:40 - sh - Derrell Upton (1); 5:39 - Brent Gauvreau (1)
Curtis Cruickshank (2 – 0, 24 saves / 26 shots)		Goalie stats	Tyrone Garner (0 – 2, 30 saves / 33 shots)

March 20	Oshawa Generals	4 – 3	OT	Kingston Frontenacs	Kingston Memorial Centre	Recap
Derrell Upton (2) - pp - 7:09; Chester Gallant (1) - 14:17		First period		No scoring
Kevin Colley (1) - pp - 2:44		Second period		6:30 - pp - Rob Mailloux (1); 8:48 - pp - Aaron Fransen (2)
No scoring		Third period		2:58 - Matt Cooke (1)
Warren Holmes (1) - 12:00		First overtime period		No scoring
Tyrone Garner (1 – 2, 38 saves / 41 shots)		Goalie stats		Curtis Cruickshank (2 – 1, 37 saves / 41 shots)

March 22	Kingston Frontenacs	3 – 5	Oshawa Generals	Oshawa Civic Auditorium	Recap
Matt Cooke (2) - sh - 14:17		First period	No scoring
Jan Bulis (2) - 15:26		Second period	9:21 - Brandon Coalter (2); 17:44 - pp - Derrell Upton (3)
Matt Cooke (3) - 6:02		Third period	1:18 - pp - Adam Colagiacomo (1); 7:41 - Andrew Peters (1); 18:21 - Brandon Coalter (3)
Curtis Cruickshank (2 – 2, 37 saves / 42 shots)		Goalie stats	Tyrone Garner (2 – 2, 45 saves / 48 shots)

March 24	Oshawa Generals	6 – 7	OT	Kingston Frontenacs	Kingston Memorial Centre	Recap
Jim Baxter (1) - pp - 16:05		First period		13:52 - pp - Jan Bulis (3); 18:16 - pp - Jan Bulis (4)
Brent Gauvreau (2) - 13:48; Brad Ralph (2) - 18:10		Second period		3:30 - Matt Elich (1)
Derrell Upton (4) - 6:49; Derrell Upton (5) - 13:21; Dan Hinote (1) - 19:17		Third period		1:07 - Colin Chaulk (2); 9:03 - pp - Mike Oliveira (3); 16:38 - Matt Cooke (4)
No scoring		First overtime period		8:08 - Matt Bradley (1)
Tyrone Garner (2 – 3, 42 saves / 49 shots)		Goalie stats		Curtis Cruickshank (3 – 2, 52 saves / 58 shots)

March 22	Kingston Frontenacs	4 – 5	OT	Oshawa Generals	Oshawa Civic Auditorium	Recap
Mike Oliveira (4) - pp - 11:07; Jan Bulis (5) - 12:06		First period		14:24 - pp - Andrew Peters (2)
Jan Bulis (6) - 7:12		Second period		0:58 - pp - Jim Baxter (2); 12:17 - Brent Gauvreau (3)
Jan Bulis (7) - 1:20		Third period		4:20 - Jim Baxter (3)
No scoring		First overtime period		8:41 - Warren Holmes (2)
Curtis Cruickshank (3 – 3, 39 saves / 44 shots)		Goalie stats		Tyrone Garner (3 – 3, 43 saves / 47 shots)

March 26	Oshawa Generals	1 – 3	Kingston Frontenacs	Kingston Memorial Centre	Recap
No scoring		First period	3:55 - pp - Chris Allen (1)
Dan Hinote (2) - 0:15		Second period	No scoring
No scoring		Third period	11:36 - Michael Zigomanis (1); 19:49 - en - Colin Chaulk (3)
Tyrone Garner (3 – 4, 51 saves / 53 shots)		Goalie stats	Curtis Cruickshank (4 – 3, 26 saves / 27 shots)

Kingston wins series 4 – 3

==== Central Division ====
===== (2) Barrie Colts vs. (5) Sudbury Wolves =====
March 15	Sudbury Wolves	3 – 4	Barrie Colts	Barrie Molson Centre	Recap
Konstantin Kalmikov (1) - 3:33		First period	17:00 - Martin Skoula (1)
No scoring		Second period	2:41 - Nick Smith (1); 5:34 - sh - Jeff Tetzlaff (1); 11:41 - Keith Delaney (1)
Glenn Crawford (1) - 5:45; Mike Fisher (1) - 6:27		Third period	No scoring
Kory Cooper (0 – 1, 32 saves / 36 shots)		Goalie stats	Brian Finley (1 – 0, 29 saves / 32 shots)

March 17	Barrie Colts	4 – 3	OT	Sudbury Wolves	Sudbury Community Arena	Recap
No scoring		First period		3:37 - Konstantin Kalmikov (2); 5:03 - pp - Konstantin Kalmikov (3)
Keith Delaney (2) - 2:54; Mike Christian (1) - 5:17		Second period		4:17 - pp - Taylor Pyatt (1)
Jeff Tetzlaff (2) - 0:41		Third period		No scoring
Keith Delaney (3) - 1:08		First overtime period		No scoring
John Hultberg (1 – 0, 37 saves / 40 shots)		Goalie stats		Kory Cooper (0 – 2, 33 saves / 37 shots)

March 19	Sudbury Wolves	6 – 3	Barrie Colts	Barrie Molson Centre	Recap
Peter Campbell (1) - sh - 16:24		First period	No scoring
Konstantin Kalmikov (4) - 10:17; Glenn Crawford (2) - sh - 12:40; Peter Campbell (2) - 15:23; Jason Sands (1) - 19:21		Second period	13:51 - Keith Delaney (4)
Konstantin Kalmikov (5) - en - 19:32		Third period	0:34 - pp - Luch Nasato (1); 16:21 - Jeff Tetzlaff (3)
Kory Cooper (1 – 2, 46 saves / 49 shots)		Goalie stats	John Hultberg (1 – 1, 19 saves / 24 shots); Brian Finley (7 saves / 7 shots)

March 20	Barrie Colts	3 – 4	OT	Sudbury Wolves	Sudbury Community Arena	Recap
Brock Boucher (1) - 14:26; Mike Christian (2) - pp - 19:34		First period		9:48 - Mike Fisher (2)
Michael Henrich (1) - 1:03		Second period		No scoring
No scoring		Third period		0:37 - sh - Jeremy Adduono (1); 11:25 - pp - Taylor Pyatt (2)
No scoring		First overtime period		0:13 - Taylor Pyatt (3)
Brian Finley (1 – 1, 43 saves / 47 shots)		Goalie stats		Kory Cooper (2 – 2, 34 saves / 37 shots)

March 22	Sudbury Wolves	3 – 2	Barrie Colts	Barrie Molson Centre	Recap
No scoring		First period	No scoring
Peter Campbell (3) - 13:23		Second period	1:12 - Daniel Tkaczuk (1); 13:49 - Daniel Tkaczuk (2)
Peter Campbell (4) - 14:59; Brad Morgan (1) - 18:22		Third period	No scoring
Kory Cooper (3 – 2, 35 saves / 37 shots)		Goalie stats	Brian Finley (1 – 2, 32 saves / 35 shots)

March 24	Barrie Colts	1 – 4	Sudbury Wolves	Sudbury Community Arena	Recap
Mike Christian (3) - 16:33		First period	6:49 - Peter Campbell (5)
No scoring		Second period	3:13 - Jason Sands (2)
No scoring		Third period	12:23 - Glenn Crawford (3); 19:19 - en - Jeremy Adduono (2)
Brian Finley (1 – 3, 35 saves / 38 shots)		Goalie stats	Kory Cooper (4 – 2, 38 saves / 39 shots)

Sudbury wins series 4 – 2

===== (3) Kitchener Rangers vs. (4) Owen Sound Platers =====
March 15	Owen Sound Platers	1 – 6	Kitchener Rangers	Kitchener Memorial Auditorium	Recap
No scoring		First period	11:26 - pp - Mark McMahon (1)
No scoring		Second period	12:27 - Serge Payer (1); 14:21 - sh - Darren Mortier (1); 15:48 - Josh Seabrook (1)
Jason Doyle (1) - 10:28		Third period	6:01 - Vratislav Cech (1); 13:45 - pp - Darcy Harris
Eoin McInerney (0 – 1, 29 saves / 33 shots); Curtis Sanford (8 saves / 10 shots)		Goalie stats	Mike Gorman (1 – 0, 35 saves / 36 shots)

March 17	Kitchener Rangers	1 – 8	Owen Sound Platers	Bayshore Community Centre	Recap
No scoring		First period	4:51 - pp - Wes Goldie (1); 6:39 - Jason Doyle (2)
Ben Schust (1) - 12:01		Second period	1:59 - Adam Mair (1); 3:30 - pp - Larry Paleczny (1); 7:51 - pp - Ryan Christie (1)
No scoring		Third period	2:20 - Adam Mair (2); 7:36 - Sean Avery (1); 10:07 - Randy Davidson (1)
Mike Gorman (1 – 1, 30 saves / 35 shots); Shawn Degagne (22 saves / 25 shots)		Goalie stats	Eoin McInerney (1 – 1, 35 saves / 36 shots)

March 19	Owen Sound Platers	2 – 7	Kitchener Rangers	Kitchener Memorial Auditorium	Recap
No scoring		First period	3:24 - Tony Gutilla (1); 10:52 - Darcy Harris (2); 19:33 - Ryan Milanovic (1)
Jason Doyle (3) - 3:43; Ryan Christie (2) - 4:18		Second period	8:26 - Michal Dvorak (1)
No scoring		Third period	7:42 - pp - Serge Payer (2); 11:31 - pp - Ben Schust (2); 18:27 - Michal Dvorak (2)
Eoin McInerney (1 – 2, 34 saves / 41 shots)		Goalie stats	Mike Gorman (2 – 1, 41 saves / 43 shots)

March 21	Kitchener Rangers	0 – 4	Owen Sound Platers	Bayshore Community Centre	Recap
No scoring		First period	5:54 - Chris Wismer (1)
No scoring		Second period	7:52 - Jason Doyle (4)
No scoring		Third period	0:30 - Ryan Christie (3); 19:55 - en - Colin Beardsmore (1)
Mike Gorman (2 – 2, 25 saves / 28 shots); Shawn Degagne (11 saves / 11 shots)		Goalie stats	Curtis Sanford (1 – 0, 32 saves / 32 shots)

March 22	Owen Sound Platers	6 – 2	Kitchener Rangers	Kitchener Memorial Auditorium	Recap
Mike Dombkiewicz (1) - 2:09		First period	0:55 - Ben Schust (3); 6:00 - pp - Allan Rourke (1)
Larry Paleczny (2) - sh - 7:50; Mike Lankshear (1) - pp - 9:34		Second period	No scoring
Mike Dombkiewicz (2) - pp - 0:47; Dan Snyder (1) - sh - 12:36; Larry Paleczny (3) - pp - 14:37		Third period	No scoring
Curtis Sanford (2 – 0, 39 saves / 41 shots)		Goalie stats	Mike Gorman (2 – 3, 25 saves / 29 shots); Shawn Degagne (9 saves / 11 shots)

March 24	Kitchener Rangers	3 – 4	OT	Owen Sound Platers	Bayshore Community Centre	Recap
Vratislav Cech (2) - 0:29; Ryan Held (1) - 3:47; Serge Payer (3) - 10:44		First period		7:44 - Dan Snyder (2); 11:20 - Wes Goldie (2)
No scoring		Second period		No scoring
No scoring		Third period		2:40 - Jason Doyle (5)
No scoring		First overtime period		1:11 - Kyle Flaxey (1)
Simon Degagne (0 – 1, 47 saves / 51 shots)		Goalie stats		Curtis Sanford (3 – 0, 36 saves / 39 shots)

Owen Sound wins series 4 – 2

==== West Division ====
===== (1) London Knights vs. (4) Erie Otters =====
March 15	Erie Otters	0 – 2	London Knights	London Ice House	Recap
No scoring		First period	No scoring
No scoring		Second period	No scoring
No scoring		Third period	12:01 - Chris Kelly (1); 19:54 - en - Tom Kostopoulos (1)
Steve Valiquette (0 – 1, 35 saves / 36 shots)		Goalie stats	Gene Chiarello (1 – 0, 34 saves / 34 shots)

March 18	London Knights	5 – 4	OT	Erie Otters	Erie Civic Center	Recap
Mark Cadotte (1) - 8:05		First period		No scoring
Jay Legault (1) - 2:57; Mark Cadotte (2) - sh - 16:51		Second period		1:58 - pp - Steve Montador (1)
Mark Cadotte (3) - pp - 1:50		Third period		3:53 - sh - Shane Nash (1); 8:47 - Michael Rupp (1); 12:33 - Vadim Sharapov (1)
Tom Kostopoulos (2) - 2:56		First overtime period		No scoring
Gene Chiarello (2 – 0, 50 saves / 54 shots)		Goalie stats		Steve Valiquette (0 – 2, 30 saves / 35 shots)

March 20	Erie Otters	1 – 2	2OT	London Knights	London Ice House	Recap
No scoring		First period		No scoring
Shane Nash (2) - 0:13		Second period		9:55 - sh - Richard Pitirri (1)
No scoring		Third period		No scoring
No scoring		Second overtime period		8:36 - Chris Kelly (2)
Steve Valiquette (0 – 3, 54 saves / 56 shots)		Goalie stats		Gene Chiarello (3 – 0, 48 saves / 49 shots)

March 21	London Knights	0 – 7	Erie Otters	Erie Civic Center	Recap
No scoring		First period	6:02 - pp - Shane Nash (3); 6:27 - Jesse Black (1)
No scoring		Second period	0:48 - Vadim Sharapov (2); 14:49 - sh - Shane Nash (4)
No scoring		Third period	4:57 - Colin Pepperall (1); 15:02 - Tyler Rennette (1); 15:52 - pp - Michael Rupp (2)
Gene Chiarello (3 – 1, 37 saves / 44 shots)		Goalie stats	Steve Valiquette (1 – 3, 17 saves / 17 shots)

March 23	Erie Otters	3 – 1	London Knights	London Ice House	Recap
Tyler Rennette (2) - 2:02		First period	No scoring
No scoring		Second period	19:25 - Richard Pitirri (2)
Colin Pepperall (2) - 1:23; Tyler Rennette (3) - 13:40		Third period	No scoring
Steve Valiquette (2 – 3, 48 saves / 49 shots)		Goalie stats	Gene Chiarello (3 – 2, 37 saves / 40 shots)

March 24	London Knights	3 – 4	OT	Erie Otters	Erie Civic Center	Recap
Rico Fata (1) - 11:37		First period		No scoring
Tom Kostopoulos (3) - 4:58		Second period		10:45 - Tim Connolly (1)
Maxim Spiridonov (1) - 11:16		Third period		3:21 - Arvid Rekis (1); 16:57 - Jason Baird (1)
No scoring		First overtime period		16:06 - Michael Rupp (3)
Gene Chiarello (3 – 3, 33 saves / 37 shots)		Goalie stats		Steve Valiquette (3 – 3, 33 saves / 36 shots)

March 26	Erie Otters	2 – 3	London Knights	London Ice House	Recap
Colin Pepperall (3) - 2:20		First period	No scoring
Colin Pepperall (4) - pp - 14:25		Second period	8:04 - pp - Evgeny Korolev (1); 19:26 - pp - Tom Kostopoulos (4)
No scoring		Third period	2:22 - Rico Fata (2)
Steve Valiquette (3 – 4, 36 saves / 39 shots)		Goalie stats	Gene Chiarello (4 – 3, 35 saves / 37 shots)

London wins series 4 – 3

===== (2) Plymouth Whalers vs. (3) Sarnia Sting =====
March 14	Sarnia Sting	1 – 3	Plymouth Whalers	Compuware Sports Arena	Recap
Chad Cavanagh (1) - 16:09		First period	3:41 - pp - Sergei Fedotov (1)
No scoring		Second period	No scoring
No scoring		Third period	5:07 - Harold Druken (1); 19:50 - en - David Legwand (1)
Patrick DesRochers (0 – 1, 29 saves / 31 shots)		Goalie stats	Robert Esche (1 – 0, 28 saves / 29 shots)

March 17	Plymouth Whalers	4 – 6	Sarnia Sting	Sarnia Arena	Recap
David Legwand (2) - 12:57		First period	11:34 - pp - Ryan VanBuskrik (1)
David Legwand (3) - 0:37; Steve Wasylko (1) - pp - 2:42		Second period	8:17 - pp - Greg Willers (1); 15:22 - Jeff Heerema (1)
Brian Passmore (1) - 10:08		Third period	1:24 - Ivan Novoseltsev (1); 13:09 - sh - Jon Sim (1); 19:19 - en - Andrew Proskurnicki (1)
Robert Esche (1 – 1, 32 saves / 37 shots)		Goalie stats	Patrick DesRochers (1 – 1, 37 saves / 41 shots)

March 19	Sarnia Sting	1 – 7	Plymouth Whalers	Compuware Sports Arena	Recap
No scoring		First period	3:05 - pp - Yuri Babenko (1); 16:19 - pp - Harold Druken (2)
No scoring		Second period	5:15 - Jesse Boulerice (1); 15:25 - pp - Yuri Babenko (2); 19:48 - pp - Andrew Taylor (1)
Jeff Heerema (2) - 3:56		Third period	2:31 - David Legwand (4); 6:59 - pp - Harold Druken (3)
Patrick DesRochers (1 – 2, 25 saves / 29 shots); Greg Hewitt (23 saves / 26 shots)		Goalie stats	Robert Esche (2 – 1, 21 saves / 22 shots)

March 21	Plymouth Whalers	7 – 2	Sarnia Sting	Sarnia Arena	Recap
Eric Gooldy (1) - 2:36; Steve Wasylko (2) - sh - 5:19; Paul Mara (1) - pp - 16:55		First period	13:18 - Michael Hanson (1)
Harold Druken (4) - 5:11; Harold Druken (5) - 6:13		Second period	6:51 - Jeff Heerema (3)
Steve Wasylko (3) - 1:40; Andrew Taylor (2) - pp - 14:24		Third period	No scoring
Robert Esche (3 – 1, 39 saves / 41 shots)		Goalie stats	Patrick DesRochers (1 – 3, 4 saves / 6 shots); Greg Hewitt (45 saves / 50 shots)

March 22	Sarnia Sting	2 – 3	OT	Plymouth Whalers	Compuware Sports Arena	Recap
No scoring		First period		No scoring
Greg Willers (2) - pp - 4:35		Second period		10:14 - pp - Sergei Fedotov (2)
Jeff Heerema (4) - 13:25		Third period		11:26 - Troy Smith (1)
No scoring		First overtime period		0:30 - Randy Fitzgerald (1)
Greg Hewitt (0 – 1, 35 saves / 38 shots)		Goalie stats		Robert Esche (4 – 1, 37 saves / 39 shots)

Plymouth wins series 4 – 1

=== OHL quarter-finals ===
==== (C1) Guelph Storm vs. (C5) Sudbury Wolves ====
March 27	Sudbury Wolves	3 – 6	Guelph Storm	Guelph Memorial Gardens	Recap
Jeremy Adduono (3) - sh - 14:01		First period	3:54 - Brian Willsie (1); 10:48 - Jason Jackman (1); 18:59 - Matt Lahey (1)
Jeremy Adduono (4) - pp - 11:55; Konstantin Kalmikov (6) - 18:08		Second period	0:41 - Andrew Long (1)
No scoring		Third period	1:14 - Nick Bootland (1); 10:49 - pp - Andrew Long (2)
Kory Cooper (47 saves / 53 shots)		Goalie stats	Chris Madden (30 saves / 33 shots)

March 31	Guelph Storm	4 – 1	Sudbury Wolves	Sudbury Community Arena	Recap
Jason Jackman (2) - pp - 16:07		First period	6:47 - pp - Glenn Crawford (4)
Nick Bootland (2) - 5:06; Kent McDonell (1) - 5:19; Kent McDonell (2) - 10:08		Second period	No scoring
No scoring		Third period	No scoring
Chris Madden (29 saves / 30 shots)		Goalie stats	Kory Cooper (36 saves / 40 shots)

April 2	Sudbury Wolves	1 – 8	Guelph Storm	Guelph Memorial Gardens	Recap
No scoring		First period	3:42 - Manny Malhotra (1); 5:24 - pp - Brian Willsie (2); 11:27 - pp - Nick Bootland (3)
No scoring		Second period	11:33 - Nick Bootland (4); 14:57 - Kent McDonell (3)
Konstantin Kalmikov (7) - pp - 3:46		Third period	9:02 - pp - Kevin Mitchell (1); 10:32 - pp - Jason Jackman (3); 14:02 - pp - Bob Crummer (1)
Kory Cooper (11 saves / 14 shots); Andrew Raycroft (28 saves / 33 shots)		Goalie stats	Chris Madden (27 saves / 28 shots)

April 3	Guelph Storm	4 – 1	Sudbury Wolves	Sudbury Community Arena	Recap
Manny Malhotra (2) - 7:07; Manny Malhotra (3) - 14:02		First period	14:56 - Jeremy Adduono (5)
No scoring		Second period	No scoring
Manny Malhotra (4) - 0:35; Brian Willsie (3) - 13:24		Third period	No scoring
Chris Madden (34 saves / 35 shots)		Goalie stats	Kory Cooper (8 saves / 9 shots); Andrew Raycroft (19 saves / 22 shots)

Guelph wins series 4 – 0

==== (E1) Ottawa 67's vs. (C4) Owen Sound Platers ====
March 28	Ottawa 67's	4 – 5	Owen Sound Platers	Bayshore Community Centre	Recap
No scoring		First period	5:43 - Wes Goldie (3); 18:09 - Adam Mair (3)
Troy Stonier (1) - 13:20; Matt Zultek (1) - 19:45		Second period	11:51 - Colin Beardsmore (2); 13:57 - Jason Doyle (6); 18:03 - Jason Doyle (7)
David Bell (1) - 12:40; Mark Bell (1) - 19:19		Third period	No scoring
Craig Hillier (35 saves / 40 shots); Seamus Kotyk (4 saves / 4 shots)		Goalie stats	Curtis Sanford (42 saves / 46 shots)

March 31	Owen Sound Platers	2 – 4	Ottawa 67's	Ottawa Civic Centre	Recap
Adam Campbell (1) - 12:03		First period	No scoring
Adam Campbell (2) - 17:22		Second period	13:41 - pp - Troy Stonier (2); 14:22 - Dan Tessier (1); 16:52 - pp - Mark Bell (2)
No scoring		Third period	14:55 - David Bell (2)
Curtis Sanford (34 saves / 38 shots)		Goalie stats	Craig Hillier (17 saves / 19 shots)

April 2	Ottawa 67's	4 – 2	Owen Sound Platers	Bayshore Community Centre	Recap
Dan Tessier (2) - 9:22		First period	No scoring
Joe Talbot (1) - 0:31; Dan Tessier (3) - 10:59		Second period	1:34 - Adam Mair (4); 9:51 - Adam Mair (5)
Dan Tudin (1) - 8:47		Third period	No scoring
Craig Hillier (32 saves / 34 shots)		Goalie stats	Curtis Sanford (44 saves / 48 shots)

April 3	Owen Sound Platers	3 – 7	Ottawa 67's	Ottawa Civic Centre	Recap
Adam Campbell (3) - 19:06		First period	0:20 - Troy Stonier (3); 1:52 - Dan Tudin (2)
Colin Beardsmore (3) - pp - 15:33		Second period	4:46 - pp - Jonathan Zion (1)
Adam Mair (6) - 5:31		Third period	3:47 - Ben Gustavson (1); 6:41 - Ben Gustavson (2); 9:34 - Mark Bell (3); 17:41 - Ben Gustavson (3)
Curtis Sanford (39 saves / 46 shots)		Goalie stats	Craig Hillier (30 saves / 33 shots)

April 5	Owen Sound Platers	2 – 8	Ottawa 67's	Ottawa Civic Centre	Recap
Joel Ward (1) - 0:38		First period	6:05 - pp - Mark Bell (4); 7:47 - David Bell (3); 12:54 - sh - Ben Gustavson (4); 15:00 - pp - Ben Gustavson (5)
Adam Campbell (4) - 15:23		Second period	10:55 - Troy Stonier (4); 14:08 - pp - David Bell (4); 18:59 - Mark Bell (5)
No scoring		Third period	10:36 - Dan Tessier (4)
Curtis Sanford (12 saves / 16 shots); Eoin McInerney (26 saves / 30 shots)		Goalie stats	Craig Hillier (18 saves / 20 shots)

Ottawa wins series 4 – 1

==== (W1) London Knights vs. (E3) Kingston Frontenacs ====
March 29	Kingston Frontenacs	1 – 4	London Knights	London Ice House	Recap
Chris Allen (2) - pp - 6:16		First period	1:58 - Richard Pitirri (3); 13:48 - Mark Cadotte (4)
No scoring		Second period	No scoring
No scoring		Third period	14:37 - Chris Kelly (3) - 14:37; 19:40 - en - Evgeny Korolev (2)
Curtis Cruickshank (4 – 4, 37 saves / 40 shots)		Goalie stats	Gene Chiarello (5 – 3, 35 saves / 36 shots)

March 31	London Knights	6 – 9	Kingston Frontenacs	Kingston Memorial Centre	Recap
Rico Fata (3) - pp - 7:35		First period	11:10 - pp - Chris Allen (3); 15:07 - Matt Cooke (5)
Mark Cadotte (5) - sh - 0:30; Joel Scherban (1) - pp - 4:52		Second period	3:01 - Jonathan Schill (1); 5:35 - Mike Oliveira (5); 8:30 - pp - Matt Bradley (2); 14:34 - pp - Matt Cooke (6); 15:25 - Matt Bradley (3)
Tom Kostopoulos (5) - 0:21; Mark Cadotte (6) - 13:47; Jeff Brown (1) - 17:09		Third period	9:58 - Rob Mailloux (2); 12:54 - Chris Allen (4)
Gene Chiarello (21 saves / 26 shots); Elliott Faust (0 – 1, 17 saves/ 21 shots)		Goalie stats	Curtis Cruickshank (5 – 4, 32 saves / 38 shots)

April 2	Kingston Frontenacs	5 – 8	London Knights	London Ice House	Recap
No scoring		First period	1:56 - Joel Scherban (2); 2:50 - Mark Cadotte (7); 3:11 - Rico Fata (4); 6:29 - Maxim Spiridonov (2); 9:14 - Krys Barch (1); 15:56 - Tom Kostopoulos (6)
Colin Chaulk (4) - pp - 12:06; Rob Mailloux (3) - pp - 16:14		Second period	10:41 - pp - Mark Cadotte (8)
Mike Oliveira (6) - 10:16; Matt Cooke (7) - 16:09; Jan Bulis (8) - 17:46		Third period	9:47 - Mike Mazzuca (1)
Curtis Cruickshank (6 saves / 9 shots); Nick Foley (0 – 1, 29 saves / 34 shots)		Goalie stats	Gene Chiarello (6 – 3, 38 saves / 43 shots)

April 4	London Knights	4 – 3	OT	Kingston Frontenacs	Kingston Memorial Centre	Recap
Mark Cadotte (9) - sh - 16:57; Rico Fata (5) - 19:03		First period		No scoring
No scoring		Second period		3:37 - pp - Matt Cooke (8); 7:53 - Matt Price (2); 16:53 - sh - Matt Price (3)
Mark Cadotte (10) - pp - 0:42		Third period		No scoring
Krys Barch (2) - 9:10		First overtime period		No scoring
Gene Chiarello (7 – 3, 43 saves / 46 shots)		Goalie stats		Curtis Cruickshank (5 – 5, 39 saves / 43 shots)

April 6	Kingston Frontenacs	2 – 5	London Knights	London Ice House	Recap
Rob Mailloux (4) - pp - 12:12		First period	14:34 - Rico Fata (6)
Matt Elich (2) - 8:57		Second period	10:42 - Krys Barch (3); 12:01 - Rico Fata (7)
No scoring		Third period	10:24 - Rico Fata (8); 18:45 - en - Mark Cadotte (11)
Curtis Cruickshank (5 – 6, 35 saves / 39 shots)		Goalie stats	Gene Chiarello (8 – 3, 37 saves / 39 shots)

London wins series 4 – 1

==== (E2) Belleville Bulls vs. (W2) Plymouth Whalers ====
March 28	Belleville Bulls	5 – 6	Plymouth Whalers	Compuware Sports Arena	Recap
Ryan Ready (5) - 0:26; Jonathan Cheechoo (2) - pp - 11:07; Joel Trottier (2) - 13:48		First period	15:04 - pp - Andrew Taylor (3); 18:56 - pp - Andrew Taylor (4); 19:55 - Andrew Taylor (5)
Jim Midgley (3) - 3:51; Joel Trottier (3) - 4:18		Second period	3:09 - pp - Julian Smith (1); 9:37 - Randy Fitzgerald (2); 19:32 - Randy Fitzgerald (3)
No scoring		Third period	No scoring
Shawn Gallant (4 – 1, 36 saves / 42 shots)		Goalie stats	Robert Esche (5 – 1, 37 saves / 42 shots)

March 31	Plymouth Whalers	3 – 2	Belleville Bulls	Yardmen Arena	Recap
Paul Mara (2) - pp - 11:16		First period	2:03 - Jim Midgley (4)
Jesse Boulerice (2) - 8:54		Second period	No scoring
Randy Fitzgerald (4) - 2:05		Third period	10:37 - Daniel Cleary (5)
Robert Esche (6 – 1, 42 saves / 44 shots)		Goalie stats	Shawn Gallant (4 – 2, 35 saves / 38 shots)

April 1	Plymouth Whalers	4 – 3	OT	Belleville Bulls	Yardmen Arena	Recap
Harold Druken (6) - pp - 9:25		First period		16:34 - Joel Trottier (4)
No scoring		Second period		11:45 - Jonathan Cheechoo (3)
Andrew Taylor (6) - pp - 3:29; Andrew Taylor (7) - 19:51		Third period		10:56 - Derek Campbell (2)
Julian Smith (2) - 1:46		First overtime period		No scoring
Robert Esche (7 – 1, 45 saves / 48 shots)		Goalie stats		Shawn Gallant (4 – 3, 27 saves / 31 shots)

April 3	Belleville Bulls	3 – 2	Plymouth Whalers	Compuware Sports Arena	Recap
Joel Dezainde (3) - 6:40		First period	19:30 - Harold Druken (7)
Andrei Shurupov (2) - 2:18; Daniel Cleary (6) - 14:37		Second period	No scoring
No scoring		Third period	2:15 - Harold Druken (8)
Shawn Gallant (5 – 3, 28 saves / 30 shots)		Goalie stats	Robert Esche (7 – 2, 39 saves / 42 shots)

April 5	Plymouth Whalers	3 – 4	Belleville Bulls	Yardmen Arena	Recap
Nikos Tselios (1) - pp - 4:58		First period	No scoring
David Legwand (5) - pp - 16:40		Second period	13:02 - pp - Jonathan Cheechoo (4)
Paul Mara (3) - 5:35		Third period	0:35 - pp - Justin Papineau (4); 12:41 - pp - Chris Stanley (3); 14:22 - Kevin Baker (4)
Robert Esche (7 – 3, 43 saves / 47 shots)		Goalie stats	Shawn Gallant (6 – 3, 36 saves / 39 shots)

April 7	Belleville Bulls	2 – 6	Plymouth Whalers	Compuware Sports Arena	Recap
Justin Papineau (5) - pp - 17:06		First period	9:18 - David Legwand (6)
No scoring		Second period	8:28 - Sergei Fedotov (3); 12:07 - pp - Randy Fitzgerald (5)
Joel Trottier (5) - 5:23		Third period	5:47 - David Legwand (7); 13:46 - Randy Fitzgerald (6); 19:18 - Kristopher Purdy (1)
Shawn Gallant (6 – 4, 34 saves / 40 shots)		Goalie stats	Robert Esche (8 – 3, 34 saves / 36 shots)

Plymouth wins series 4 – 2

=== OHL semi-finals ===
==== (C1) Guelph Storm vs. (W2) Plymouth Whalers ====
April 10	Plymouth Whalers	1 – 2	Guelph Storm	Guelph Memorial Gardens	Recap
No scoring		First period	No scoring
Yuri Babenko (3) - pp - 11:05		Second period	7:56 - Brian Willsie (4)
No scoring		Third period	11:19 - Eric Beaudoin (1)
Robert Esche (8 – 4, 38 saves / 40 shots)		Goalie stats	Chris Madden (5 – 0, 39 saves / 40 shots)

April 13	Guelph Storm	5 – 1	Plymouth Whalers	Compuware Sports Arena	Recap
Nick Bootland (5) - 1:21		First period	No scoring
Matt Lahey (2) - pp - 11:41; Eric Beaudoin (2) - 16:11		Second period	No scoring
Kent McDonell (4) - 4:40; Chris Hajt (1) - pp - 10:29		Third period	1:28 - Julian Smith (3)
Chris Madden (6 – 0, 18 saves / 19 shots)		Goalie stats	Robert Esche (8 – 5, 31 saves / 36 shots)

April 16	Plymouth Whalers	1 – 5	Guelph Storm	Guelph Memorial Gardens	Recap
No scoring		First period	2:57 - Brian Willsie (5); 12:33 - Nick Bootland (6); 18:00 - Jason Jackman (4)
David Legwand (8) - 6:11		Second period	No scoring
No scoring		Third period	2:44 - Andrew Long (3); 7:24 - Matt Lahey (3)
Robert Esche (8 – 6, 34 saves / 39 shots); Robert Holsinger (5 saves / 5 shots)		Goalie stats	Chris Madden (7 – 0, 17 saves / 18 shots)

April 17	Guelph Storm	5 – 2	Plymouth Whalers	Compuware Sports Arena	Recap
Jason Jackman (5) - pp - 8:00; Brian Willsie (6) - pp - 10:12		First period	No scoring
Nick Bootland (7) - 14:42		Second period	No scoring
Brian Willsie (7) - 2:38; Manny Malhotra (5) - sh - 10:48		Third period	0:20 - Harold Druken (9); 14:05 - Brian Passmore (2)
Chris Madden (8 – 0, 27 saves / 29 shots)		Goalie stats	Robert Esche (8 – 7, 21 saves / 24 shots); Robert Holsinger (7 saves / 9 shots)

Guelph wins series 4 – 0

==== (E1) Ottawa 67's vs. (W1) London Knights ====
April 10	London Knights	0 – 3	Ottawa 67's	Ottawa Civic Centre	Recap
No scoring		First period	3:47 - pp - Troy Stonier (5)
No scoring		Second period	9:12 - Jonathan Zion (2)
No scoring		Third period	5:07 - sh - Dan Tessier (5)
Gene Chiarello (8 – 4, 29 saves / 32 shots)		Goalie stats	Craig Hillier (5 – 1, 24 saves / 24 shots)

April 11	London Knights	2 – 3	Ottawa 67's	Ottawa Civic Centre	Recap
No scoring		First period	1:17 - Dan Tudin (3); 9:30 - pp - Justin Davis (1)
Rico Fata (9) - 5:21		Second period	No scoring
Maxim Spiridonov (3) - 7:07		Third period	3:37 - Troy Stonier (6)
Gene Chiarello (8 – 5, 39 saves / 42 shots)		Goalie stats	Craig Hillier (7 saves / 8 shots); Seamus Kotyk (1 – 0, 20 saves / 21 shots)

April 14	Ottawa 67's	4 – 2	London Knights	London Ice House	Recap
Dan Tudin (4) - pp - 2:57; Justin Davis (2) - 17:37		First period	No scoring
Brian Campbell (1) - pp - 0:38; Justin Davis (3) - 16:18		Second period	0:18 - sh - Mark Cadotte (12); 11:36 - Krys Barch (4)
No scoring		Third period	No scoring
Seamus Kotyk (2 – 0, 36 saves / 38 shots)		Goalie stats	Gene Chiarello (8 – 6, 41 saves / 45 shots)

April 16	Ottawa 67's	5 – 2	London Knights	London Ice House	Recap
No scoring		First period	18:51 - pp - Chris Kelly (4)
Jonathan Zion (3) - pp - 5:51; Matt Zultek (2) - pp - 10:08; Ben Gustavson (6) - pp - 11:02		Second period	No scoring
Justin Davis (4) - pp - 6:37; Dan Tessier (6) - pp - 11:26		Third period	2:36 - pp - Richard Pitirri (4)
Craig Hillier (6 – 1, 27 saves / 29 shots)		Goalie stats	Gene Chiarello (8 – 7, 48 saves / 53 shots)

Ottawa wins series 4 – 0

=== OHL finals ===
==== (C1) Guelph Storm vs. (E1) Ottawa 67's ====
April 22	Ottawa 67's	2 – 5	Guelph Storm	Guelph Memorial Gardens	Recap
No scoring		First period	5:03 - Matt Lahey (4); 10:05 - Manny Malhotra (6); 11:33 - Kent McDonell (5)
No scoring		Second period	17:01 - Matt Lahey (5)
Matt Zultek (3) - 6:28; Matt Zultek (4) - pp - 12:00		Third period	8:26 - Mike Vellinga (1)
Craig Hillier (6 – 2, 15 saves / 18 shots); Seamus Kotyk (21 saves / 23 shots)		Goalie stats	Chris Madden (9 – 0, 33 saves / 35 shots)

April 24	Guelph Storm	3 – 2	Ottawa 67's	Ottawa Civic Centre	Recap
Brian Willsie (8) - 5:40; Kent McDonell (6) - 7:13		First period	13:58 - Justin Davis (5)
No scoring		Second period	8:44 - Matt Zultek (5)
Manny Malhotra (7) - pp - 16:54		Third period	No scoring
Chris Madden (10 – 0, 30 saves / 32 shots)		Goalie stats	Seamus Kotyk (2 – 1, 26 saves / 29 shots)

April 25	Guelph Storm	1 – 8	Ottawa 67's	Ottawa Civic Centre	Recap
No scoring		First period	3:12 - Ben Gustavson (7); 15:20 - Joe Talbot (2)
No scoring		Second period	0:45 - pp - Troy Stonier (7); 8:37 - Stephen Lafleur (1); 9:08 - Ben Gustavson (8)
Eric Beaudoin (3) - pp - 15:44		Third period	2:33 - Matt Zultek (6); 7:35 - Mark Bell (6); 16:20 - Joe Talbot (3)
Chris Madden (10 – 1, 19 saves / 23 shots); Chris Thompson (21 saves / 25 shots)		Goalie stats	Seamus Kotyk (3 – 1, 28 saves / 29 shots)

April 27	Ottawa 67's	1 – 2	Guelph Storm	Guelph Memorial Gardens	Recap
Lance Galbraith (1) - 3:01		First period	No scoring
No scoring		Second period	No scoring
No scoring		Third period	9:43 - Kent McDonell (7); 17:50 - Brian Willsie (9)
Seamus Kotyk (3 – 2, 22 saves / 24 shots)		Goalie stats	Chris Madden (11 – 1, 25 saves / 26 shots)

April 29	Ottawa 67's	3 – 4	Guelph Storm	Guelph Memorial Gardens	Recap
Dan Tessier (7) - 17:24		First period	11:43 - Manny Malhotra (8)
No scoring		Second period	18:46 - Jason Jackman (6)
Ben Gustavson (9) - 5:08; Joe Talbot (4) - 14:15		Third period	1:37 - Eric Beaudoin (4); 17:04 - Brian Willsie (10)
Seamus Kotyk (3 – 3, 27 saves / 31 shots)		Goalie stats	Chris Madden (12 – 1, 25 saves / 28 shots)

Guelph wins series 4 – 1

=== Playoff scoring leaders ===
Note: GP = Games played; G = Goals; A = Assists; Pts = Points; PIM = Penalty minutes

Player	Team	GP	G	A	Pts	PIM
Daniel Cleary	Belleville Bulls	10	6	17	23	10
Harold Druken	Plymouth Whalers	15	9	11	20	4
David Legwand	Plymouth Whalers	15	8	12	30	24
Mark Cadotte	London Knights	16	12	7	19	15
Dan Tessier	Ottawa 67's	14	7	12	19	12
Mike Oliviera	Kingston Frontenacs	12	6	13	19	8
Jan Bulis	Kingston Frontenacs	12	8	10	18	12
Matt Zultek	Ottawa 67's	14	6	12	18	20
Troy Stonier	Ottawa 67's	14	7	10	17	8
Paul Mara	Plymouth Whalers	15	3	14	17	30

=== Playoff leading goaltenders ===
Note: GP = Games played; Mins = Minutes played; W = Wins; L = Losses: OTL = Overtime losses; SL = Shootout losses; GA = Goals Allowed; SO = Shutouts; GAA = Goals against average

Player	Team	GP	Mins	W	L	GA	SO	Sv%	GAA
Chris Madden	Guelph Storm	13	749	12	1	23	0	0.939	1.84
Steve Valiquette	Erie Otters	7	468	3	4	15	1	0.944	1.92
Seamus Kotyk	Ottawa 67's	8	392	3	3	15	0	0.925	2.29
Craig Hillier	Ottawa 67's	9	448	6	2	20	1	0.911	2.68
Shawn Gallant	Belleville Bulls	10	602	6	4	29	2	0.911	2.89

== All-Star teams ==
=== First team ===
- David Legwand, Centre, Plymouth Whalers
- Rob Mailloux, Left Wing, Kingston Frontenacs
- Brian Willsie, Right Wing, Guelph Storm
- Chris Allen, Defence, Kingston Frontenacs
- Sean Blanchard, Defence, Ottawa 67's
- Bujar Amidovski, Goaltender, Toronto St. Michael's Majors
- Gary Agnew, Coach, London Knights

=== Second team ===
- Jon Sim, Centre, Sarnia Sting
- Colin Pepperall, Left Wing, Erie Otters
- Maxim Spiridonov, Right Wing, London Knights
- Ric Jackman, Defence, Sault Ste. Marie Greyhounds
- Chris Hajt, Defence, Guelph Storm
- Robert Esche, Goaltender, Plymouth Whalers
- George Burnett, Coach, Guelph Storm

=== Third team ===
- Peter Sarno, Centre, Windsor Spitfires
- Jeremy Adduono, Left Wing, Sudbury Wolves
- Matt Bradley, Right Wing, Kingston Frontenacs
- Jeff Brown, Defence, London Knights
- Brian Campbell, Defence, Ottawa 67's
- Tyrone Garner, Goaltender, Oshawa Generals
- Lou Crawford, Coach, Belleville Bulls

== Awards ==
J. Ross Robertson Cup:	Guelph Storm
Hamilton Spectator Trophy:	Guelph Storm
Leyden Trophy:	Ottawa 67's
Emms Trophy:	Guelph Storm
Bumbacco Trophy:	London Knights
Red Tilson Trophy:	David Legwand, Plymouth Whalers
Eddie Powers Memorial Trophy:	Peter Sarno, Windsor Spitfires
Matt Leyden Trophy:	Gary Agnew, London Knights
Jim Mahon Memorial Trophy:	Maxim Spiridonov, London Knights
Max Kaminsky Trophy:	Chris Allen, Kingston Frontenacs
OHL Goaltender of the Year:	Bujar Amidovski, Toronto St. Michael's Majors
Jack Ferguson Award:	Jay Harrison, Brampton Battalion
Dave Pinkney Trophy:	Craig Hillier and Seamus Kotyk, Ottawa 67's
OHL Executive of the Year:	Paul McIntosh, London Knights
Emms Family Award:	David Legwand, Plymouth Whalers
F.W. 'Dinty' Moore Trophy:	Seamus Kotyk, Ottawa 67's
OHL Humanitarian of the Year:	Jason Metcalfe, London Knights
William Hanley Trophy:	Matt Bradley, Kingston Frontenacs
Leo Lalonde Memorial Trophy:	Bujar Amidovski, Toronto St. Michael's Majors
Bobby Smith Trophy:	Manny Malhotra, Guelph Storm

== 1998 OHL Priority Selection ==
On June 6, 1998, the OHL conducted the 1998 Ontario Hockey League Priority Selection at the Barrie Molson Centre in Barrie, Ontario. The Brampton Battalion held the first overall pick in the draft, and selected Jay Harrison from the Oshawa Legionaires. Harrison was awarded the Jack Ferguson Award, awarded to the top pick in the draft.

The 1998 draft was the first draft for the newest OHL expansion teams, the Brampton Battalion and Mississauga IceDogs, who would begin to play during the 1998-99 season.

Below are the players who were selected in the first round of the 1998 Ontario Hockey League Priority Selection.

#	Player	Nationality	OHL Team	Hometown	Minor Team
1	Jay Harrison (D)	Canada	Brampton Battalion	Whitby, Ontario	Oshawa Legionaires
2	Lou Dickenson (LW)	Canada	Mississauga IceDogs	Orleans, Ontario	Ottawa South Canadians
3	Chris Eade (D)	Canada	North Bay Centennials	Oshawa, Ontario	Oshawa Legionaires
4	Mark Popovic (D)	Canada	Toronto St. Michael's Majors	Stoney Creek, Ontario	Mississauga Chargers
5	Dan Growden (D)	Canada	Windsor Spitfires	Bridgenorth, Ontario	Peterborough Petes Bantam
6	Derek Fox (D)	Canada	Sault Ste. Marie Greyhounds	Thunder Bay, Ontario	Quinte Hawks
7	Aaron Molnar (G)	Canada	Peterborough Petes	Dorchester, Ontario	St. Thomas Stars
8	Corey Sabourin (D)	Canada	Sudbury Wolves	Orleans, Ontario	Cumberland Grads
9	Chris Minard (C)	Canada	Owen Sound Platers	Owen Sound, Ontario	Owen Sound Greys
10	Jonah Leroux (LW)	Canada	Oshawa Generals	Williamstown, Ontario	Char-Lan Rebels
11	Mike Wehrestedt (RW)	Canada	Kitchener Rangers	Thunder Bay, Ontario	Thunder Bay Kings
12	Brad Boyes (RW)	Canada	Erie Otters	Mississauga, Ontario	Mississauga Rebels
13	Brett Clouthier (RW)	Canada	Kingston Frontenacs	Arnprior, Ontario	Kanata Lasers
14	Ryan Hare (C)	Canada	Sarnia Sting	Sarnia, Ontario	Sarnia Legionnaires
15	Kristopher Vernarsky (C)	United States	Plymouth Whalers	Warren, Michigan	USA U18
16	Darryl Bootland (RW)	Canada	Barrie Colts	Schomberg, Ontario	Orangeville Crushers
17	Bobby Turner (D)	Canada	London Knights	Stoney Creek, Ontario	Quinte Hawks
18	Kris Newbury (C)	Canada	Belleville Bulls	Brampton, Ontario	Brampton Capitals
19	Luke Sellars (D)	Canada	Ottawa 67's	Pickering, Ontario	Wexford Raiders
20	Matthew Rock (D)	Canada	Guelph Storm	Fergus, Ontario	Elmira Sugar Kings

== See also ==
- List of OHA Junior A standings
- List of OHL seasons
- 1998 Memorial Cup
- 1998 NHL entry draft
- 1997 in sports
- 1998 in sports

Preceded by 1996–97 OHL season	OHL seasons	Succeeded by 1998–99 OHL season
