= Chris Hajt =

Canadian-born American ice hockey player

- Born: July 5, 1978 (age 47) Saskatoon, Saskatchewan, Canada
- Height: 6 ft 3 in (191 cm)
- Weight: 206 lb (93 kg; 14 st 10 lb)
- Position: Defence
- Shot: Left
- Played for: Edmonton Oilers; Washington Capitals; Füchse Duisburg; Lukko; HC Bolzano
- NHL draft: 32nd overall, 1996; Edmonton Oilers
- Playing career: 1998–2008

Christopher William Hajt (born July 5, 1978) is a Canadian-born American former ice hockey defenceman. He played 6 games in the National Hockey League (NHL) with the Edmonton Oilers and Washington Capitals during the 2000–01 and 2003–04 seasons. The rest of his career, which lasted from 1998 to 2008, was mainly spent in the minor leagues. After his playing career, Hajt became a coach and has been an Assistant Coach with the Ontario Reign of the American Hockey League since 2019. Hajt's father, Bill Hajt, also played in the NHL.

== Career ==
Born in Saskatoon, Saskatchewan and raised in Amherst, New York when his father, Bill Hajt was a member of the Buffalo Sabres. He attended Williamsville North High School and graduated in 1996. Hajt was drafted by the Edmonton Oilers in the second round, 32nd overall in the 1996 NHL entry draft after playing junior hockey with the Guelph Storm of the Ontario Hockey League (OHL). He became an excellent defenseman in his junior career with the Storm. Hajt spent time in the National Hockey League, playing in six games, one with the Oilers during the 2000–2001 season, the other five with the Washington Capitals in the 2003–2004 season, and did not record a point in the NHL.

Hajt played for Hockey Club Bolzano-Bozen of the Italian Serie A in 2007, before retiring in May 2008.

== Coaching career ==
Hajt worked as an assistant coach with the Guelph Storm of the OHL from 2008 to 2014. In the 2014–15 AHL season, he was the assistant coach of the Manchester Monarchs. From 2015 to 2017, he served as the assistant coach of the Ontario Reign, serving under Mike Stothers.

From 2017 to 2019, he served as the assistant coach of the Buffalo Sabres. Hajt returned to the Ontario Reign of the AHL on June 25, 2019.

== Career statistics ==
=== Regular season and playoffs ===
			Regular season					Playoffs
Season	Team	League	GP	G	A	Pts	PIM	GP	G	A	Pts	PIM
1993–94	Amherst Knights U16	U16 AAA	38	8	20	28	16	—	—	—	—	—
1994–95	Guelph Storm	OHL	57	1	7	8	35	14	0	2	2	9
1995–96	Guelph Storm	OHL	63	8	27	35	69	16	0	6	6	13
1995–96	Guelph Storm	M-Cup	—	—	—	—	—	3	0	0	0	2
1996–97	Guelph Storm	OHL	58	11	15	26	62	18	0	8	8	25
1997–98	Guelph Storm	OHL	44	2	21	23	46	13	1	5	6	11
1997–98	Guelph Storm	M-Cup	—	—	—	—	—	5	0	3	3	2
1998–99	Hamilton Bulldogs	AHL	64	0	4	4	36	—	—	—	—	—
1999–00	Hamilton Bulldogs	AHL	54	0	8	8	30	10	0	2	2	0
2000–01	Edmonton Oilers	NHL	1	0	0	0	0	—	—	—	—	—
2000–01	Hamilton Bulldogs	AHL	70	0	10	10	48	—	—	—	—	—
2001–02	Hamilton Bulldogs	AHL	39	2	3	5	34	15	1	2	3	8
2002–03	Portland Pirates	AHL	71	11	15	26	61	1	0	0	0	0
2003–04	Washington Capitals	NHL	5	0	0	0	2	—	—	—	—	—
2003–04	Portland Pirates	AHL	66	3	13	16	53	7	1	2	3	8
2004–05	Portland Pirates	AHL	53	3	6	9	16	—	—	—	—	—
2004–05	Augusta Lynx	ECHL	13	1	4	5	8	—	—	—	—	—
2005–06	Lowell Lock Monsters	AHL	60	1	12	13	5	—	—	—	—	—
2006–07	Füchse Duisburg	DEL	44	2	9	11	44	—	—	—	—	—
2006–07	Lukko	FIN	10	1	0	1	82	3	1	2	3	4
2007–08	HC Bolzano	ITA	32	4	7	11	30	12	0	2	2	6
AHL totals			477	20	71	91	283	33	2	6	8	18
NHL totals			6	0	0	0	2	—	—	—	—	—

=== International ===
Year	Team	Event	GP	G	A	Pts	PIM
1997	United States	WJC	6	1	0	1	2
1998	United States	WJC	7	0	0	0	10
Junior totals			13	1	0	1	12
