= Beardsmore =

Beardsmore is a surname. Notable people with the surname include:

- Colin Beardsmore (born 1978), Canadian ice hockey player
- Russell Beardsmore (born 1968), British footballer
- Sue Beardsmore (born 1955), British television presenter
