= Adduono =

Adduono is an Italian surname. Notable people with the surname include:

- Jeremy Adduono (born 1978), Canadian ice hockey, Bridgeport Sound Tigers player
- Ray Adduono (born 1947), Canadian ice hockey centre
- Rick Adduono (born 1955), Canadian ice hockey, Atlanta Flames player
