= Nick Bootland =

Canadian ice hockey player (born 1978)

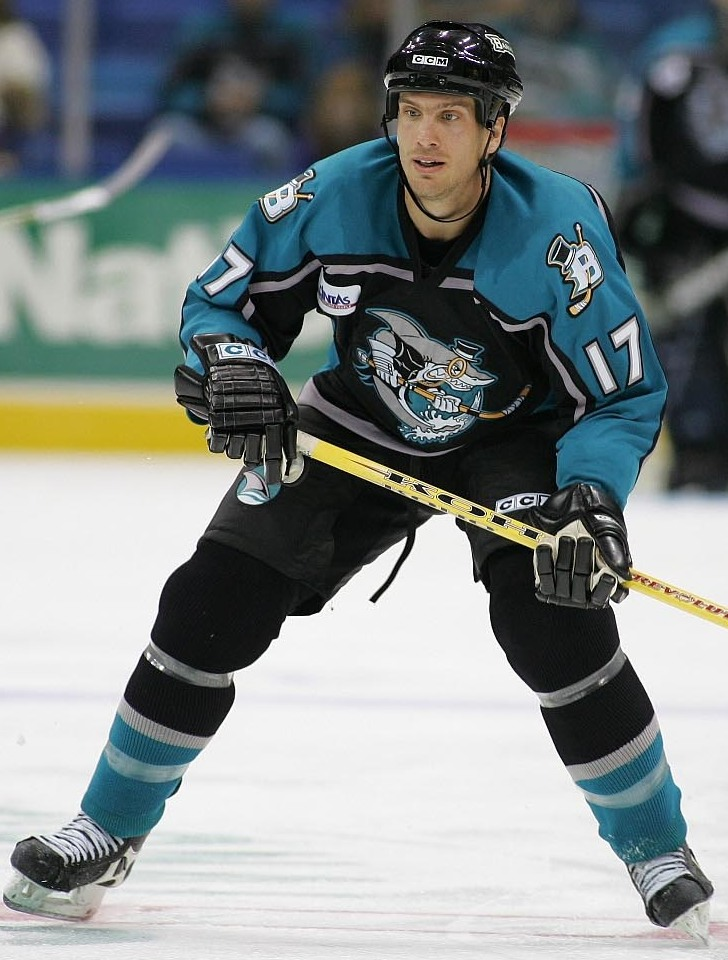
- Nick Bootland with the Cleveland Barons in 2004
- Born: July 21, 1978 (age 48) Shelburne, Ontario, Canada
- Height: 6 ft 2 in (188 cm)
- Weight: 218 lb (99 kg; 15 st 8 lb)
- Position: Right wing
- Shot: Left
- Played for: Hershey Bears; Cleveland Barons
- NHL draft: 220th overall, 1996; Dallas Stars
- Playing career: 1998–2008

Nick Bootland (born July 21, 1978) is a Canadian former professional ice hockey player. He later served as the head coach and director of hockey operations of the Kalamazoo Wings in the ECHL, a position he held from May 29, 2008 to August 2022, when he was named assistant coach of the Hershey Bears of the AHL. On June 30, 2026 the Columbus Blue Jackets named Bootland the eighth head coach of the Cleveland Monsters.

Bootland was selected by the Dallas Stars in the 9th round (220th overall) of the 1996 NHL entry draft. His brother, Darryl, played in the NHL for the Detroit Red Wings and New York Islanders.

== Career statistics ==
			Regular season					Playoffs
Season	Team	League	GP	G	A	Pts	PIM	GP	G	A	Pts	PIM
1995–96	Guelph Storm	OHL	64	8	7	15	90	16	1	0	1	21
1996–97	Guelph Storm	OHL	64	35	23	58	117	18	11	7	18	36
1997–98	Guelph Storm	OHL	64	23	37	60	128	13	7	6	13	22
1998–99	Hershey Bears	AHL	62	3	6	9	122	—	—	—	—	—
1999–00	Hershey Bears	AHL	59	5	13	18	108	14	2	2	4	26
2000–01	Hershey Bears	AHL	71	6	8	14	110	12	1	3	4	2
2001–02	Cincinnati Cyclones	ECHL	60	25	30	55	102	3	0	1	1	11
2001–02	Cleveland Barons	AHL	19	2	3	5	15	—	—	—	—	—
2002–03	Cleveland Barons	AHL	1	0	0	0	2	—	—	—	—	—
2002–03	Hershey Bears	AHL	16	1	0	1	10	—	—	—	—	—
2002–03	Cincinnati Cyclones	ECHL	54	19	24	43	114	15	10	7	17	10
2003–04	Columbus Stars	UHL	34	21	17	38	17	—	—	—	—	—
2003–04	Cleveland Barons	AHL	25	5	4	9	16	9	1	2	3	17
2003–04	Kalamazoo Wings	UHL	17	6	9	15	47	—	—	—	—	—
2004–05	Cleveland Barons	AHL	76	7	9	16	92	—	—	—	—	—
2005–06	Kalamazoo Wings	UHL	76	39	39	78	133	13	10	6	16	16
2006–07	Kalamazoo Wings	UHL	75	40	45	85	100	20	12	10	22	29
2007–08	Kalamazoo Wings	IHL	73	46	36	82	71	—	—	—	—	—
AHL totals			329	29	43	72	475	35	4	7	11	45
