= Dan Tudin =

Canadian-born Italian ice hockey player

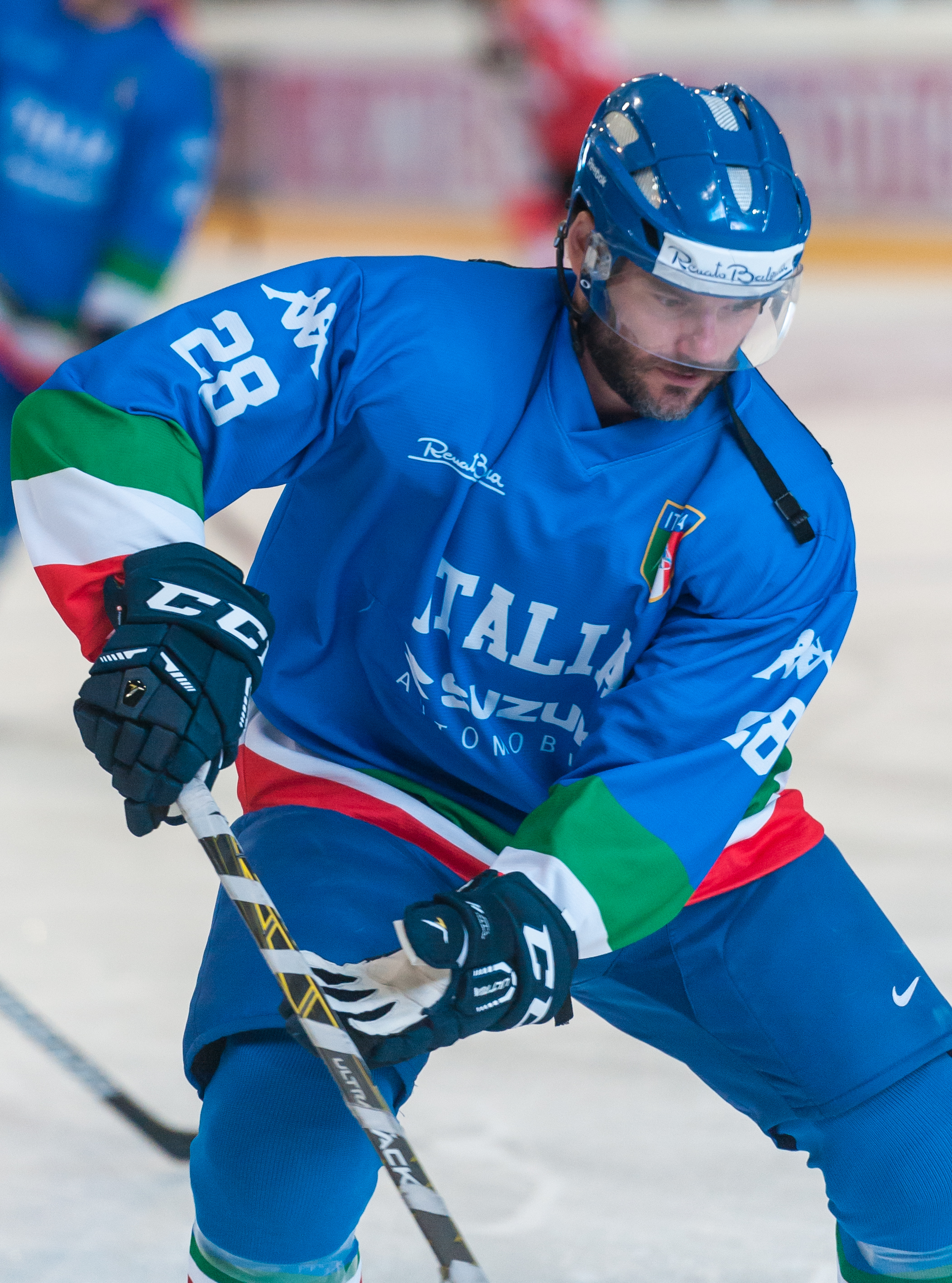
- Born: August 3, 1978 (age 48) Orleans, Ontario, Canada
- Height: 6 ft 0 in (183 cm)
- Weight: 203 lb (92 kg; 14 st 7 lb)
- Position: Left wing
- Shoots: Left
- Serie A team Former teams: Ritten Sport; AHL; Omaha Ak-Sar-Ben Knights; ECHL; Columbus Cottonmouths; Las Vegas Wranglers
- National team: Italy
- NHL draft: Undrafted
- Playing career: 2003–present

Daniel Tudin (born August 3, 1978) is a Canadian-born Italian professional ice hockey player. He is currently playing in Italy with Ritten Sport of the Serie A.

== Amateur career ==
Tudin played major junior hockey in the Ontario Hockey League with the Ottawa 67's. He then played college hockey with Dalhousie University before turning professional with the 2003–04 Columbus Cottonmouths of the ECHL.

== Career statistics ==
			Regular season					Playoffs
Season	Team	League	GP	G	A	Pts	PIM	GP	G	A	Pts	PIM
1995–96	Ottawa 67's	OHL	61	5	9	14	21	4	0	0	0	0
1996–97	Ottawa 67's	OHL	54	5	6	11	29	24	4	4	8	14
1997–98	Ottawa 67's	OHL	63	28	30	58	41	14	4	6	10	4
1998–99	Ottawa 67's	OHL	61	24	33	57	40	9	3	1	4	6
1999–00	Dalhousie University	CIAU	25	8	6	14	20	—	—	—	—	—
2000–01	Dalhousie University	CIAU	26	10	23	33	46	—	—	—	—	—
2001–02	Dalhousie University	CIS	28	10	26	36	30	—	—	—	—	—
2002–03	Dalhousie University	CIS	27	10	19	29	39	—	—	—	—	—
2003–04	Columbus Cottonmouths	ECHL	66	18	28	46	57	—	—	—	—	—
2004–05	Las Vegas Wranglers	ECHL	65	21	21	42	63	—	—	—	—	—
2005–06	Las Vegas Wranglers	ECHL	65	33	44	77	61	13	3	4	7	13
2005–06	Omaha Ak-Sar-Ben Knights	AHL	5	0	0	0	4	—	—	—	—	—
2006–07	Ritten Sport	Italy	38	20	24	44	38	8	5	1	6	6
2007–08	Ritten Sport	Italy	33	18	17	35	26	9	4	3	7	4
2008–09	Ritten Sport	Italy	41	28	39	67	54	9	3	10	13	0
2009–10	Ritten Sport	Italy	38	33	30	63	18	14	5	15	20	8
2010–11	Ritten Sport	Italy	35	18	30	48	42	5	2	3	5	0
2011–12	Ritten Sport	Italy	45	12	28	40	26	—	—	—	—	—
2012–13	Ritten Sport	Italy	39	20	23	43	22	7	2	1	3	2
2013–14	Ritten Sport	Italy	40	14	26	40	32	17	6	8	14	18
2014–15	Ritten Sport	Italy	37	14	20	34	24	17	4	5	9	22
2015–16	Ritten Sport	Italy	41	24	10	34	12	14	6	6	12	8
2016–17	Ritten Sport	AlpsHL	40	15	16	31	12	12	3	8	11	10
2016–17	Ritten Sport	Italy	2	2	0	2	0	—	—	—	—	—
2017–18	Ritten Sport	AlpsHL	37	15	18	33	12	16	3	6	9	4
2017–18	Ritten Sport	Italy	2	1	1	2	0	—	—	—	—	—
2018–19	Ritten Sport	AlpsHL	38	14	23	37	18	8	3	3	6	2
2018–19	Ritten Sport	Italy	4	2	0	2	0	—	—	—	—	—
2019–20	Ritten Sport	AlpsHL	41	13	33	46	10	—	—	—	—	—
2019–20	Ritten Sport	Italy	3	0	2	2	0	—	—	—	—	—
2020–21	Ritten Sport	AlpsHL	21	6	16	22	4	—	—	—	—	—
2020–21	Ritten Sport	Italy	3	0	2	2	0	—	—	—	—	—
ECHL totals			196	72	93	165	181	13	3	4	7	13
Italy totals			401	206	252	458	294	105	40	55	95	74
AlpsHL totals			177	63	106	169	56	36	9	17	26	16

== Awards and honours ==
Award	Year
Memorial Cup (Ottawa 67's)	1999
