= Jeremy Adduono =

Canadian ice hockey player (born 1978)

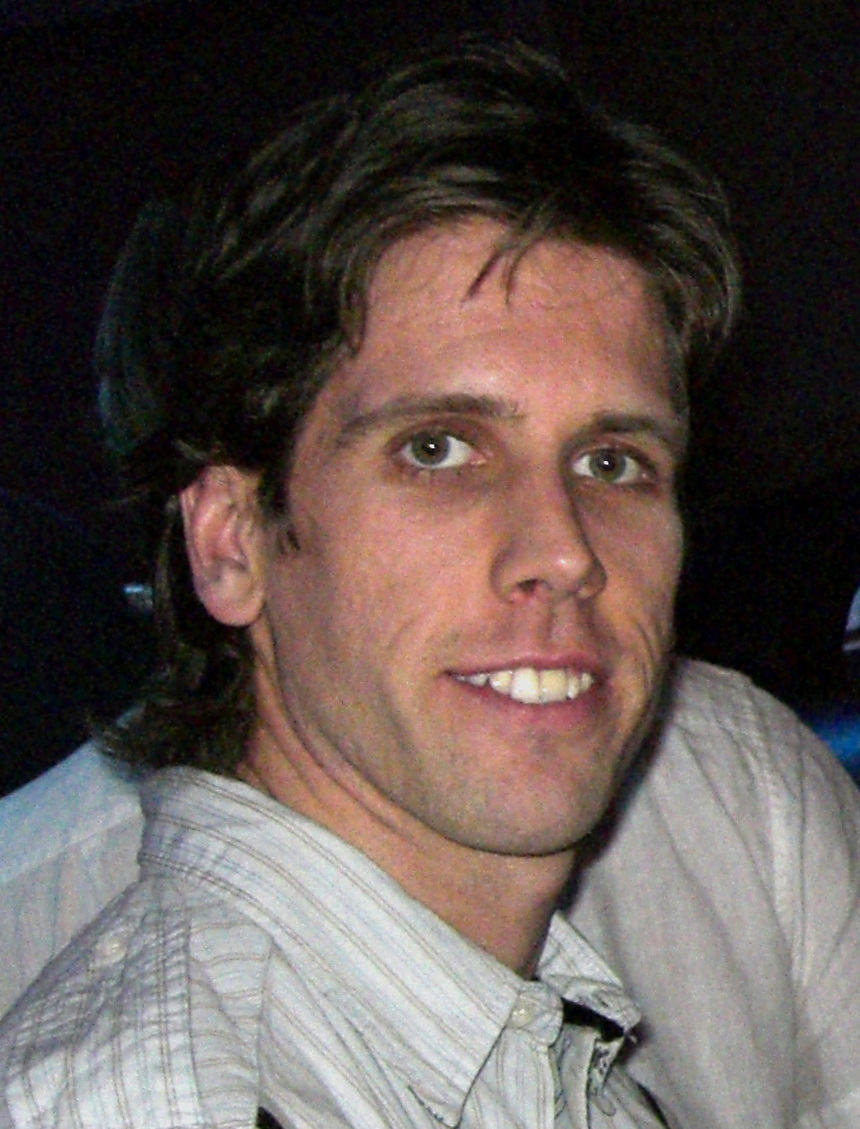
- Adduono in 2007
- Born: August 4, 1978 (age 48) Thunder Bay, Ontario, Canada
- Height: 6 ft 0 in (183 cm)
- Weight: 202 lb (92 kg; 14 st 6 lb)
- Position: Left wing
- Shot: Right
- Played for: Rochester Americans; Bridgeport Sound Tigers; Kölner Haie; Iserlohn Roosters; HC Pustertal Wölfe
- National team: Canada
- NHL draft: 184th overall, 1997; Buffalo Sabres
- Playing career: 1999–2010

Jeremy Adduono (born August 4, 1978) is a Canadian former professional ice hockey winger. He was drafted in the seventh round, 184th overall, by the Buffalo Sabres in the 1997 NHL entry draft from the Ontario Hockey League's Sudbury Wolves.

Adduono performed well for the Sabres in a rookie camp in 1998, and he debuted with Buffalo's American Hockey League (AHL) affiliate, the Rochester Americans, in the 1999–2000 season.

He played with the Americans for three seasons and spent one more AHL season with the Bridgeport Sound Tigers before moving to Europe to play in Germany's Deutsche Eishockey Liga with the Cologne Sharks. After three seasons with the Sharks and one with the Iserlohn Roosters, Adduono joined HC Pustertal Wölfe of Italy's Serie A in the 2007–08 season. In 2008, he moved to Ravensburg Towerstars based in Ravensburg, Germany, who play in the German 2. Bundesliga, where he played two seasons.

Adduono was the head coach of the Thunder Bay North Stars in the Superior International Junior Hockey League, from 2015 to 2017. He has since taken on an assistant coaching role with the Lakehead Thunderwolves university men's hockey team.

== Career statistics ==
			Regular season					Playoffs
Season	Team	League	GP	G	A	Pts	PIM	GP	G	A	Pts	PIM
1994–95	Thunder Bay Flyers	USHL	40	10	8	18	10	—	—	—	—	—
1995–96	Sudbury Wolves	OHL	66	15	22	37	14	—	—	—	—	—
1996–97	Sudbury Wolves	OHL	66	29	40	69	24	—	—	—	—	—
1997–98	Sudbury Wolves	OHL	66	37	69	106	40	10	5	5	10	10
1999–00	Rochester Americans	AHL	51	23	22	45	20	21	6	11	17	2
2000–01	Rochester Americans	AHL	76	24	30	54	53	4	1	0	1	4
2001–02	Rochester Americans	AHL	79	15	20	35	38	1	1	0	1	0
2002–03	Bridgeport Sound Tigers	AHL	54	13	13	26	14	9	2	5	7	2
2003–04	Kölner Haie	DEL	41	11	13	24	16	5	2	2	4	0
2004–05	Kölner Haie	DEL	32	6	10	16	30	7	1	4	5	0
2005–06	Kölner Haie	DEL	46	10	17	27	20	9	2	4	6	12
2006–07	Iserlohn Roosters	DEL	50	8	12	20	34	—	—	—	—	—
2007–08	HC Pustertal Wölfe	Italy	39	13	22	35	54	4	1	2	3	12
2008–09	Ravensburg Towerstars	Germany2	46	17	30	47	38	11	6	1	7	12
2009–10	Ravensburg Towerstars	Germany2	21	3	5	8	24	11	2	3	5	8
AHL totals			260	75	85	160	125	35	10	16	26	8
DEL totals			169	35	52	87	100	21	5	10	15	12
