= Jeff Heerema =

Canadian ice hockey player (born 1980)

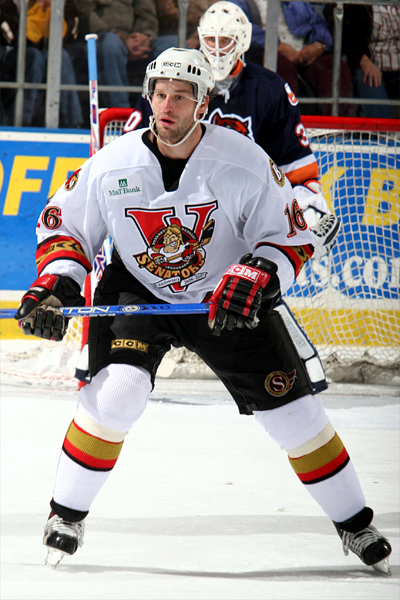
- Heerema with the Binghamton Senators during the 2006-07 season
- Born: January 17, 1980 (age 46) Thunder Bay, Ontario, Canada
- Height: 6 ft 2 in (188 cm)
- Weight: 212 lb (96 kg; 15 st 2 lb)
- Position: Right wing
- Shot: Right
- Played for: Carolina Hurricanes; St. Louis Blues; Frankfurt Lions; KHL Medveščak; Nottingham Panthers
- NHL draft: 11th overall, 1998; Carolina Hurricanes
- Playing career: 2000–2012

Jeffrey Heerema (/hɪˈriːmə/; born January 17, 1980) is a Canadian former professional ice hockey winger. He last played for the Nottingham Panthers of the EIHL. He was drafted in the first round, 11th overall, by the Carolina Hurricanes in the 1998 NHL entry draft. Prior to signing for the Nottingham club he most recently played for KHL Medveščak Zagreb in Croatia.

== Playing career ==
After playing three full seasons in the Ontario Hockey League with the Sarnia Sting, Heerema made his professional debut with the Cincinnati Cyclones of the International Hockey League in the 2000–01 season. He made his National Hockey League debut in the 2002–03 season with the Hurricanes, appearing in ten games and scoring three goals. He moved on to the St. Louis Blues for the 2003–04 season after being claimed in the NHL Waiver Draft, and appeared in 22 games, scoring one goal.

Heerema spent the entire 2005–06 and 2006–07 seasons with the Binghamton Senators of the AHL, tallying 141 points in 155 games. He signed in the 2007 off-season with German team the Frankfurt Lions of the DEL. After scoring 20 goals in 2007–08 with the Lions, Heerema was given a one-year extension to remain in Frankfurt.

A free agent to start the 2009–10 season, Heerema signed with Croatian-based KHL Medveščak Zagreb of the Austrian Hockey League on 23 November 2009. Heerema established himself with the Bears scoring 24 points in 28 games before managing to score only 2 goals as KHL reached to semi-finals in the playoffs. On 13 August 2010, it was announced that Heerema was not offered a new contract to remain in Croatia. On 29 November 2010, it was announced that Heerema had signed for the Nottingham Panthers of the UK's Elite League. Heerema finished his first season with the Panther with 18 goals and 34 points in 28 games.

Heerema returned for a second season with the Nottingham Panthers. He suffered a concussion and broken nose following a collision with teammate Matt Francis in Dundee where Panthers won the game 4-1. Due to his injury, he missed the most of October. During the first leg of the Challenge Cup Semi Final in Braehead, Heerema suffered another broken nose and concussion on February 22, 2012. A week later, he returned to Canada to rest and rehabilitate.

== Personal ==
Heerema is the cousin of Eric, Marc, Jordan and Jared Staal, all of whom have played professional hockey, and are of Dutch descent.

== Career statistics ==
			Regular season					Playoffs
Season	Team	League	GP	G	A	Pts	PIM	GP	G	A	Pts	PIM
1996–97	Thunder Bay Kings AAA	Midget	54	42	39	71	112	—	—	—	—	—
1997–98	Sarnia Sting	OHL	63	32	40	72	88	5	4	1	5	10
1998–99	Sarnia Sting	OHL	62	31	39	70	113	6	5	1	6	0
1999–2000	Sarnia Sting	OHL	67	36	41	77	62	7	4	2	6	10
2000–01	Cincinnati Cyclones	IHL	73	17	16	33	42	4	0	0	0	0
2001–02	Lowell Lock Monsters	AHL	76	33	37	70	90	5	2	3	5	2
2002–03	Lowell Lock Monsters	AHL	36	15	17	32	25	—	—	—	—	—
2002–03	Carolina Hurricanes	NHL	10	3	0	3	2	—	—	—	—	—
2003–04	St. Louis Blues	NHL	22	1	2	3	4	—	—	—	—	—
2003–04	Worcester IceCats	AHL	1	0	0	0	2	—	—	—	—	—
2003–04	Hartford Wolf Pack	AHL	41	12	15	27	25	4	0	0	0	9
2004–05	Manitoba Moose	AHL	80	14	30	44	67	14	4	6	10	12
2005–06	Binghamton Senators	AHL	77	27	47	74	69	—	—	—	—	—
2006–07	Binghamton Senators	AHL	78	36	31	67	75	—	—	—	—	—
2007–08	Frankfurt Lions	DEL	50	20	21	41	48	12	1	6	7	8
2008–09	Frankfurt Lions	DEL	48	18	13	31	53	5	3	0	3	0
2009–10	KHL Medveščak	EBEL	28	7	17	24	26	11	2	0	2	26
2010–11	Nottingham Panthers	EIHL	32	19	18	37	36	4	3	4	7	2
2011–12	Nottingham Panthers	EIHL	31	13	23	36	49	—	—	—	—	—
AHL totals			389	137	177	314	353	23	6	9	15	23
NHL totals			32	4	2	6	6	—	—	—	—	—

Awards and achievements
Preceded by Nikos Tselios	Carolina Hurricanes first-round draft pick 1998	Succeeded by David Tanabe
