= Vratislav Čech =

Czech ice hockey player (born 1979)

- Born: January 28, 1979 (age 47) Brno, Czechoslovakia
- Height: 6 ft 2 in (188 cm)
- Weight: 212 lb (96 kg; 15 st 2 lb)
- Position: Defence
- Shot: Left
- Played for: Providence Bruins; Greenville Grrrowl; Atlantic City Boardwalk Bullies; HC Femax Havířov; HC Kladno; HC Plzeň; HC Kometa Brno
- NHL draft: 56th overall, 1997; Florida Panthers
- Playing career: 1999–2008

Vratislav Čech (born January 28, 1979) is a Czech former professional ice hockey defenceman. He played in the Czech Extraliga for HC Femax Havířov, HC Kladno and HC Plzeň. He was drafted 56th overall by the Florida Panthers in the 1997 NHL entry draft.

== Career statistics ==
			Regular season					Playoffs
Season	Team	League	GP	G	A	Pts	PIM	GP	G	A	Pts	PIM
1996–97	Kitchener Rangers	OHL	57	5	19	24	72	13	1	2	3	12
1997–98	Kitchener Rangers	OHL	63	9	33	42	66	6	2	2	4	13
1998–99	Kitchener Rangers	OHL	66	6	21	27	73	1	0	1	1	4
1999–00	Providence Bruins	AHL	3	0	1	1	0	—	—	—	—	—
1999–00	Greenville Grrrowl	ECHL	55	7	15	22	51	15	0	5	5	16
2000–01	Providence Bruins	AHL	4	0	0	0	2	—	—	—	—	—
2000–01	Greenville Grrrowl	ECHL	64	10	19	29	96	—	—	—	—	—
2001–02	Providence Bruins	AHL	3	0	0	0	2	—	—	—	—	—
2001–02	Atlantic City Boardwalk Bullies	ECHL	61	10	26	36	99	12	1	2	3	26
2002–03	AZ Havirov	Czech	48	6	4	10	96	—	—	—	—	—
2003–04	Rytiri Kladno	Czech	47	1	10	11	87	—	—	—	—	—
2004–05	Rytiri Kladno	Czech	38	1	1	2	38	7	0	0	0	10
2005–06	Rytiri Kladno	Czech	50	2	6	8	86	—	—	—	—	—
2006–07	Rytiri Kladno	Czech	16	0	1	1	26	—	—	—	—	—
2006–07	HC Plzen	Czech	19	1	2	3	16	—	—	—	—	—
2007–08	HC Kometa Brno	Czech	28	3	6	9	78	11	0	0	0	10
Czech totals			218	11	24	35	349	7	0	0	0	10
