= Maxim Spiridonov =

- Born: April 7, 1978 (age 46); Moscow, Soviet Union
- Height: 5 ft 10 in (178 cm)
- Weight: 185 lb (84 kg; 13 st 3 lb)
- Position: Right wing
- Shot: Left
- Played for: Grand Rapids Griffins; Hamilton Bulldogs; Salavat Yulaev Ufa; Amur Khabarovsk; Lokomotiv Yaroslavl; Severstal Cherepovets; Dynamo Moscow; Torpedo Nizhny Novgorod; Metallurg Novokuznetsk; Ak Bars Kazan; Metallurg Magnitogorsk; Dinamo Minsk; Barys Astana
- NHL draft: 241st overall, 1998; Edmonton Oilers
- Playing career: 1998–2014

Maxim Vladimirovich Spiridonov (Russian: Максим Владимирович Спиридонов; born April 7, 1978) is a Russia professional ice hockey forward.

== Career ==
Spiridonov began his career with CSKA Moscow playing in their 2nd team. He moved onto play junior hockey for the Smiths Falls Bears in the Canadian Junior Hockey League and the London Knights of the Ontario Hockey League before he was drafted by the Edmonton Oilers, 241st overall, in 1998. Spiridonov spent the next three seasons playing in the minor leagues, suiting up for the Grand Rapids Griffins, Springfield Falcons, Tallahassee Tiger Sharks and the Hamilton Bulldogs. He never managed to play in the NHL however and in 2001, Spiridonov returned to Russia.

Spiridonov now works as a scout for the OHL's Kitchener Rangers.

== Career statistics ==
| | | | Regular season | | | | | Playoffs |
| Season | Team | League | GP | G | A | Pts | PIM | GP | G | A | Pts | PIM |
|---|---|---|---|---|---|---|---|---|---|---|---|---|
| 1994–95 | CSKA–2 Moscow | RUS.2 | 11 | 5 | 0 | 5 | 0 | — | — | — | — | — |
| 1995–96 | Smiths Falls Bears | CJHL | 51 | 52 | 36 | 88 | 71 | — | — | — | — | — |
| 1996–97 | London Knights | OHL | 55 | 31 | 22 | 53 | 99 | — | — | — | — | — |
| 1997–98 | London Knights | OHL | 66 | 54 | 44 | 98 | 52 | 16 | 4 | 3 | 7 | 4 |
| 1997–98 | Grand Rapids Griffins | IHL | — | — | — | — | — | 3 | 0 | 0 | 0 | 0 |
| 1998–99 | Grand Rapids Griffins | IHL | 41 | 11 | 17 | 28 | 12 | — | — | — | — | — |
| 1998–99 | Springfield Falcons | AHL | 23 | 8 | 8 | 16 | 2 | 2 | 0 | 0 | 0 | 2 |
| 1999–2000 | Tallahassee Tiger Sharks | ECHL | 57 | 22 | 30 | 52 | 67 | — | — | — | — | — |
| 1999–2000 | Hamilton Bulldogs | AHL | 10 | 5 | 2 | 7 | 2 | 4 | 1 | 1 | 2 | 0 |
| 2000–01 | Hamilton Bulldogs | AHL | 62 | 15 | 2 | 17 | 62 | — | — | — | — | — |
| 2001–02 | Salavat Yulaev Ufa | RSL | 25 | 4 | 5 | 9 | 18 | — | — | — | — | — |
| 2002–03 | Amur Khabarovsk | RSL | 46 | 21 | 15 | 36 | 78 | — | — | — | — | — |
| 2003–04 | Lokomotiv Yaroslavl | RSL | 19 | 4 | 2 | 6 | 8 | — | — | — | — | — |
| 2003–04 | Amur Khabarovsk | RSL | 33 | 11 | 7 | 18 | 64 | — | — | — | — | — |
| 2004–05 | Severstal Cherepovets | RSL | 52 | 6 | 13 | 19 | 70 | — | — | — | — | — |
| 2005–06 | Dynamo Moscow | RSL | 45 | 7 | 8 | 15 | 67 | 2 | 0 | 0 | 0 | 2 |
| 2006–07 | Torpedo Nizhny Novgorod | RSL | 26 | 8 | 9 | 17 | 18 | 8 | 4 | 3 | 7 | 4 |
| 2007–08 | Metallurg Novokuznetsk | RSL | 19 | 0 | 2 | 2 | 14 | — | — | — | — | — |
| 2007–08 | EHC Basel | NLA | 15 | 7 | 5 | 12 | 6 | — | — | — | — | — |
| 2008–09 | Barys Astana | KHL | 49 | 17 | 26 | 43 | 36 | 3 | 0 | 1 | 1 | 4 |
| 2009–10 | Barys Astana | KHL | 56 | 24 | 26 | 50 | 48 | 3 | 0 | 2 | 2 | 4 |
| 2010–11 | Dinamo Minsk | KHL | 43 | 11 | 18 | 29 | 20 | — | — | — | — | — |
| 2011–12 | Metallurg Novokuznetsk | KHL | 16 | 2 | 4 | 6 | 4 | — | — | — | — | — |
| 2011–12 | Ak Bars Kazan | KHL | 22 | 5 | 2 | 7 | 2 | 5 | 0 | 0 | 0 | 2 |
| 2012–13 | Barys Astana | KHL | 38 | 9 | 9 | 18 | 50 | 5 | 0 | 1 | 1 | 0 |
| 2013–14 | Barys Astana | KHL | 9 | 4 | 3 | 7 | 2 | — | — | — | — | — |
| 2013–14 | Torpedo Nizhny Novgorod | KHL | 3 | 0 | 0 | 0 | 2 | — | — | — | — | — |
| RSL totals | | | 239 | 53 | 52 | 105 | 319 | 2 | 0 | 0 | 0 | 2 |
| KHL totals | | | 236 | 72 | 88 | 160 | 164 | 16 | 0 | 4 | 4 | 10 |
