= Duncan Dalmao =

Canadian ice hockey player

- Born: December 23, 1978 (age 47) Toronto, Ontario, Canada
- Height: 6 ft 2 in (188 cm)
- Weight: 214 lb (97 kg; 15 st 4 lb)
- Position: Defence
- Shot: Left
- Played for: AHL; Norfolk Admirals; ECHL; Jacksonville Lizard Kings; Birmingham Bulls; Pee Dee Pride; Roanoke Express; EIHL; Basingstoke Bison; Greenville Grrrowl; London Racers
- NHL draft: Undrafted
- Playing career: 1998–2009

Duncan Dalmao (born December 23, 1978) is a Canadian professional ice hockey coach and former player who is the current head coach of the Indy Fuel of the ECHL. Dalmao played professionally in the North American minor leagues and the English Elite Ice Hockey League (EIHL)

Prior to turning professional, Dalmao played major junior hockey in the Ontario Hockey League. Dalmao turned professional in 1998 with the Jacksonville Lizard Kings. Dalmao played in the ECHL until 2005, when he moved to England to play for the Basingstoke Bison. Dalmao played two seasons in the EIHL, returned to North America for a season before playing two seasons in Europe to finish his professional career in 2009. Dalmao returned to the amateur ranks, when he joined the Dundas Real McCoys in 2015 for the Allan Cup playoffs.

== Awards and honours ==
Award	Year
ECHL Defenceman of the Year	2001–02
ECHL First Team All-Star	2001–02

== Career statistics ==
			Regular season					Playoffs
Season	Team	League	GP	G	A	Pts	PIM	GP	G	A	Pts	PIM
1995–96	London Knights	OHL	42	0	4	4	35	—	—	—	—	—
1996–97	London Knights	OHL	22	0	4	4	34	—	—	—	—	—
1997–98	London Knights	OHL	36	1	11	12	39	—	—	—	—	—
1997–98	Peterborough Petes	OHL	28	1	10	11	31	4	2	0	2	6
1998–99	Jacksonville Lizard Kings	ECHL	68	1	7	8	78	2	0	0	0	0
1999–00	Monroe Moccasins	WPHL	70	11	31	42	67	2	0	0	0	4
2000–01	Birmingham Bulls	ECHL	10	0	2	2	6	—	—	—	—	—
2000–01	Pee Dee Pride	ECHL	5	0	4	4	6	—	—	—	—	—
2000–01	Roanoke Express	ECHL	55	2	10	12	75	5	1	0	1	8
2001–02	Roanoke Express	ECHL	71	22	35	57	123	4	0	1	1	4
2001–02	Norfolk Admirals	AHL	1	0	0	0	0	—	—	—	—	—
2002–03	Roanoke Express	ECHL	68	11	29	40	60	4	0	1	1	0
2003–04	Roanoke Express	ECHL	72	8	46	54	169	4	0	3	3	4
2004–05	Basingstoke Bison	EIHL	25	7	5	12	16	—	—	—	—	—
2005–06	London Racers	EIHL	17	1	7	8	32	—	—	—	—	—
2005–06	Greenville Grrrowl	ECHL	42	5	19	24	50	—	—	—	—	—
2006–07	Basingstoke Bison	EIHL	54	7	30	37	132	2	0	1	1	2
2007–08	Starbulls Rosenheim	Germany3	50	6	50	56	163	6	1	2	3	43
2008–09	HYS The Hague	Netherlands	43	5	56	61	99	9	1	5	6	47
AHL totals			1	0	0	0	0	—	—	—	—	—
ECHL totals			391	49	152	201	567	19	1	5	6	16
