= Yuri Babenko =

Russian ice hockey player (born 1978)

- Born: January 2, 1978 (age 48) Penza, Russian SFSR, Soviet Union
- Height: 6 ft 0 in (183 cm)
- Weight: 198 lb (90 kg; 14 st 2 lb)
- Position: Centre
- Shot: Left
- Played for: Krylya Sovetov Moscow; Colorado Avalanche; Dynamo Moscow; Khimik Voskresensk; HC MVD; Metallurg Magnitogorsk; SKA St. Petersburg
- NHL draft: 51st overall, 1996; Colorado Avalanche
- Playing career: 1995–2016

Yury Ivanovich Babenko (Russian: Юрий Иванович Бабенко; born 2 January 1978) is a Russian former professional ice hockey player and coach. He most notably played for Dynamo Moscow of the Kontinental Hockey League (KHL) and briefly with the Colorado Avalanche of the National Hockey League (NHL).

== Playing career ==
Babenko was drafted by the Colorado Avalanche in 1996 in the 2nd round, 51st overall. After a season in the Ontario Hockey League for the Plymouth Whalers, Babenko joined the Avalanche organization in 1998. After three seasons in the American Hockey League for the Hershey Bears, he finally made his NHL debut for Colorado during the 2000–01 NHL season, playing 3 games in all without registering a point.

Babenko spent another year with Hershey before returning to Russia with Dynamo Moscow. He has also played for Khimik Voskresensk, Metallurg Magnitogorsk, and SKA St. Petersburg.

On June 28, 2009, Babenko returned on a one-year contract to former club HC MVD for the 2009–10 season. After scoring 10 point in 35 games and helping MVD advance to the finals, Babenko followed MVD into the merger with Dynamo Moscow, to sign with UHC Dynamo for the 2010–11 season on May 29, 2010.

== Coaching career ==
Following his professional playing career, Babenko moved into the coaching ranks, remaining with Dynamo Moscow as an assistant coach for two seasons. He later served as the head coach of HC Vityaz of the KHL for the 2021–22 season. He joined Ak Bars Kazan coaching ranks as an assistant during the 2022–23 season, and was elevated at interim coach before returning to an assistant role following the hiring of Zinetula Bilyaletdinov.

== Career statistics ==
=== Regular season and playoffs ===
			Regular season					Playoffs
Season	Team	League	GP	G	A	Pts	PIM	GP	G	A	Pts	PIM
1994–95	Krylya Sovetov-2 Moscow	RUS-2	28	3	7	10	30	—	—	—	—	—
1995–96	Krylya Sovetov Moscow	RUS	21	0	0	0	16	—	—	—	—	—
1995–96	Krylya Sovetov-2 Moscow	RUS-2	25	14	3	17	45	—	—	—	—	—
1996–97	Krylya Sovetov Moscow	RSL	4	1	0	1	4	—	—	—	—	—
1996–97	Krylya Sovetov-2 Moscow	RUS-3	25	8	10	18	24	—	—	—	—	—
1996–97	CSKA-2 Moscow	RUS-3	2	1	0	1	2	—	—	—	—	—
1997–98	Plymouth Whalers	OHL	59	22	34	56	22	15	3	7	10	24
1998–99	Hershey Bears	AHL	74	11	15	26	47	2	0	1	1	0
1999–00	Hershey Bears	AHL	75	20	25	45	53	14	4	3	7	37
2000–01	Hershey Bears	AHL	71	17	18	35	80	12	2	1	3	6
2000–01	Colorado Avalanche	NHL	3	0	0	0	0	—	—	—	—	—
2001–02	Hershey Bears	AHL	67	7	22	29	95	8	2	2	4	6
2002–03	Dynamo Moscow	RSL	35	3	8	11	52	2	0	0	0	2
2003–04	Dynamo Moscow	RSL	24	2	3	5	34	—	—	—	—	—
2003–04	Dynamo Moscow-2	RUS-3	6	3	1	4	16	—	—	—	—	—
2004–05	Dynamo Moscow	RSL	33	5	2	7	24	—	—	—	—	—
2004–05	Khimik Voskresensk	RSL	11	0	0	0	14	—	—	—	—	—
2005–06	HC MVD	RSL	43	8	5	13	115	4	2	1	3	16
2006–07	HC MVD	RSL	46	9	10	19	46	2	1	1	2	2
2006–07	HC MVD-2 Balashikha	RUS-4	2	2	1	3	0	—	—	—	—	—
2007–08	Metallurg Magnitogorsk	RSL	54	10	3	13	58	13	1	4	5	10
2008–09	Metallurg Magnitogorsk	KHL	5	0	0	0	4	—	—	—	—	—
2008–09	SKA St. Petersburg	KHL	46	3	9	12	38	3	1	0	1	14
2009–10	HC MVD	KHL	35	5	5	10	26	22	4	1	5	34
2010–11	Dynamo Moscow	KHL	45	4	8	12	57	6	0	1	1	4
2011–12	Dynamo Moscow	KHL	40	5	8	13	42	17	1	2	3	8
2012–13	Dynamo Moscow	KHL	34	6	6	12	14	21	1	4	5	10
2013–14	Dynamo Moscow	KHL	52	10	12	22	39	7	0	1	1	16
2014–15	Dynamo Moscow	KHL	36	4	3	7	59	7	0	2	2	25
2015–16	Dynamo Moscow	KHL	54	1	4	5	22	1	0	0	0	0
KHL totals			347	38	55	93	301	84	7	11	18	111
NHL totals			3	0	0	0	0	—	—	—	—	—

=== International ===
Year	Team	Event	GP	G	A	Pts	PIM
1996	Russia	EJC	5	0	4	4	4
Junior totals			5	0	4	4	4
