= Colin Chaulk =

Canadian ice hockey player and coach (born 1977)

- Born: January 7, 1977 (age 49) Toronto, Ontario, Canada
- Height: 6 ft 0 in (183 cm)
- Weight: 198 lb (90 kg; 14 st 2 lb)
- Position: Centre
- Shot: Left
- Played for: Adirondack Red Wings; Utah Grizzlies; Tallahassee Tiger Sharks; Jacksonville Lizard Kings; Austin Ice Bats; Kansas City Blades; Missouri River Otters; Grand Rapids Griffins; Wheeling Nailers; Colorado Gold Kings; Fort Wayne Komets; Alleghe Hockey
- NHL draft: Undrafted
- Playing career: 1998–2013

Colin Chaulk (born January 7, 1977) is a Canadian professional ice hockey coach and former player who is the head coach for the Bakersfield Condors of the American Hockey League (AHL). He had previously been the head coach of the Brampton Beast of the ECHL.

== Playing career ==
=== Junior ===
Chaulk was drafted by the Kingston Frontenacs of the Ontario Hockey League (OHL) in the fourth round, 54th overall, in the 1994 OHL Draft Priority. He was their team captain in his final season. He led Kingston in points for three consecutive seasons, starting in 1995–96 and in 1997–98, he finished fifth in OHL scoring, with a career-high 96 points (34 goals and 62 assists).

Overall, Chaulk racked up 91 goals and 177 assists for 268 points in 233 regular-season games with the Frontenacs. When his major junior career concluded in 1998, Chaulk sat in second and third place, respectively, on the team's all-time leader lists for assists and points.

=== Professional ===
Chaulk played in mostly minor-pro North American leagues for the majority of his career, but had two separate stints in Italy playing for Alleghe Hockey. He was a long-time member of the Fort Wayne Komets, where his number 91 is also retired by the team. Chaulk played in Fort Wayne in three separate stints for ten seasons—where he was the team captain for seven of them, before retiring midway through the 2012–13 ECHL season. He subsequently joined the Komets' coaching staff thereafter.

== Career statistics ==
=== Playing career ===
			Regular season					Playoffs
Season	Team	League	GP	G	A	Pts	PIM	GP	G	A	Pts	PIM
1994–95	Kingston Frontenacs	OHL	51	2	9	11	42	5	0	1	1	7
1995–96	Kingston Frontenacs	OHL	58	24	52	76	78	6	3	2	5	16
1996–97	Kingston Frontenacs	OHL	64	31	54	85	100	5	1	2	3	16
1997–98	Kingston Frontenacs	OHL	60	34	62	96	118	12	4	7	11	17
1998–99	Austin Ice Bats	WPHL	23	7	16	23	28	—	—	—	—	—
1998–99	Tallahassee Tiger Sharks	ECHL	7	0	5	5	14	—	—	—	—	—
1998–99	Jacksonville Lizard Kings	ECHL	24	8	22	30	49	2	2	1	3	6
1998–99	Utah Grizzlies	IHL	6	1	1	2	2	—	—	—	—	—
1998–99	Adirondack Red Wings	AHL	4	0	0	0	4	—	—	—	—	—
1999–2000	Missouri River Otters	UHL	50	19	47	66	88	—	—	—	—	—
1999–2000	Kansas City Blades	IHL	2	0	0	0	0	—	—	—	—	—
2000–01	Missouri River Otters	UHL	39	14	39	53	144	4	4	2	6	4
2000–01	Kansas City Blades	IHL	37	5	13	18	31	—	—	—	—	—
2001–02	Colorado Gold Kings	WCHL	55	19	46	65	94	—	—	—	—	—
2001–02	Wheeling Nailers	ECHL	3	0	0	0	0	—	—	—	—	—
2001–02	Grand Rapids Griffins	AHL	13	3	1	4	15	2	0	1	1	2
2002–03	Fort Wayne Komets	UHL	70	23	59	82	116	11	4	12	16	10
2003–04	Fort Wayne Komets	UHL	71	23	73	96	127	9	3	6	9	10
2004–05	Fort Wayne Komets	UHL	75	19	73	92	129	18	7	11	18	30
2005–06	Fort Wayne Komets	UHL	66	26	53	79	152	—	—	—	—	—
2006–07	Alleghe Hockey	Serie A	32	13	20	33	38	9	4	4	8	27
2007–08	Fort Wayne Komets	IHL2	70	24	50	74	118	12	5	6	11	32
2008–09	Fort Wayne Komets	IHL2	38	8	45	53	54	11	1	7	8	18
2009–10	Fort Wayne Komets	IHL2	71	27	58	85	115	12	4	7	11	22
2010–11	Alleghe Hockey	Serie A	26	4	15	19	40	—	—	—	—	—
2010–11	Fort Wayne Komets	CHL	39	10	30	40	51	8	3	7	10	26
2011–12	Fort Wayne Komets	CHL	60	22	39	61	59	18	6	13	19	26
2012–13	Fort Wayne Komets	ECHL	28	2	20	22	30	—	—	—	—	—

== Coaching career ==
Since retiring, Chaulk served as assistant coach in the ECHL for the Fort Wayne Komets and the Kalamazoo Wings. He became vice president of hockey operations and head coach for the Brampton Beast and served in that capacity for four seasons. Upon leaving Brampton, he served as an assistant coach in the AHL for the Belleville Senators. He left the Senators organization after a year to become a scout for the Kingston Frontenacs, the team that drafted him in 1994.

He was named an assistant coach for the Bakersfield Condors for the 2021–22 AHL season. Chaulk assumed the role of Condors interim head coach when the Edmonton Oilers promoted then-Condors head coach, Jay Woodcroft, to Edmonton, following the firing of Dave Tippett. Bakersfield removed the interim tag from Chaulk and named him as head coach for the 2022–23 AHL season onwards.

== Personal life ==
Chaulk has two daughters, Ava and Caprie. He is also the maternal uncle to Luca Marrelli, a third-round Columbus Blue Jackets draft pick in the 2024 NHL entry draft.
