= Nikos Tselios =

Greek-American ice hockey player

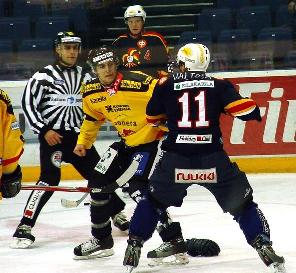
- Born: January 20, 1979 (age 47) Glen Ellyn, Illinois, U.S.
- Height: 6 ft 5 in (196 cm)
- Weight: 220 lb (100 kg; 15 st 10 lb)
- Position: Defense
- Shot: Left
- Played for: Carolina Hurricanes; KalPa; Färjestads BK
- NHL draft: 22nd overall, 1997; Carolina Hurricanes
- Playing career: 1996–2007

Nikos Tselios (Greek: Νίκος Τσέλιος; born January 20, 1979) is a Greek-American former professional ice hockey defenseman. Tselios became the first draft pick in the history of the Carolina Hurricanes when he was selected 22nd overall in the 1997 NHL entry draft.

== Playing career ==
As a youth, Tselios played in the 1993 Quebec International Pee-Wee Hockey Tournament with the Chicago Blackhawks minor ice hockey team.

Tselios was the first draft pick for the inaugural Carolina Hurricanes in the 1997 NHL entry draft. After he was drafted, Tselios returned to the OHL to play for the Belleville Bulls.

Tselios made his NHL debut with the Carolina Hurricanes during the 2001–02 season, playing two games. Those would be the only NHL games he would play as he spent the next four seasons playing in the minor leagues. In October 2005, Tselios signed with KalPa of the Finnish SM-liiga and played with them until January 31, 2006, when he moved to Färjestads BK of the Swedish Elitserien. He scored his first goal at Färjestad on March 25 in the semifinal of the Swedish Championship against HV 71. He then played in the United Hockey League with the Chicago Hounds before returning to Sweden, signing with HK Örebro in the Swedish First Division, the country's third-tier level.

== Personal life ==
Tselios is a cousin of long-time NHL defenseman Chris Chelios. Tselios also tried for the Greece national team in the 2006.

Tselios owns and operates an instructional hockey business called Infinity Hockey Selects, and resides in Illinois with his wife and son.

== Career statistics ==
=== Regular season and playoffs ===
			Regular season					Playoffs
Season	Team	League	GP	G	A	Pts	PIM	GP	G	A	Pts	PIM
1995–96	Chicago Young Americans	Midget	27	5	8	13	40	—	—	—	—	—
1996–97	Belleville Bulls	OHL	64	9	37	46	61	6	1	1	2	2
1997–98	Belleville Bulls	OHL	20	2	10	12	16	—	—	—	—	—
1997–98	Plymouth Whalers	OHL	41	20	8	28	27	15	1	8	9	27
1998–99	Plymouth Whalers	OHL	60	21	39	60	60	11	4	10	14	8
1999–2000	Cincinnati Cyclones	IHL	80	3	19	22	75	10	0	2	2	4
2000–01	Cincinnati Cyclones	IHL	79	7	18	25	98	5	0	3	3	0
2001–02	Carolina Hurricanes	NHL	2	0	0	0	6	—	—	—	—	—
2001–02	Lowell Lock Monsters	AHL	70	3	16	9	64	—	—	—	—	—
2002–03	Lowell Lock Monsters	AHL	61	4	8	12	65	—	—	—	—	—
2002–03	Springfield Falcons	AHL	13	0	2	2	12	6	0	0	0	4
2003–04	Springfield Falcons	AHL	75	5	8	13	105	—	—	—	—	—
2004–05	Utah Grizzlies	AHL	5	1	1	2	4	—	—	—	—	—
2004–05	Springfield Falcons	AHL	35	3	6	9	37	—	—	—	—	—
2005–06	KalPa	SM-l	21	0	3	3	67	—	—	—	—	—
2005–06	Färjestad BK	SEL	7	0	0	0	10	11	1	0	1	12
2006–07	Chicago Hounds	UHL	4	0	0	0	0	—	—	—	—	—
2006–07	Örebro HK	Div.1	8	3	4	7	2	2	2	0	2	14
2007–08	Örebro HK	Div.1	32	4	13	17	132	3	1	0	1	25
NHL totals			2	0	0	0	6	—	—	—	—	—
AHL totals			259	16	41	57	287	6	0	0	0	4

=== International ===
Year	Team	Event	Result	GP	G	A	Pts	PIM
1997	United States	WJC	2nd place, silver medalist(s)	7	1	1	2	6
1998	United States	WJC	5th	6	0	0	0	8
Junior totals				13	1	1	2	14

Preceded by Jean-Sébastien Giguère	Carolina Hurricanes first-round draft pick 1997	Succeeded by Jeff Heerema
