= Evgeny Korolev (ice hockey) =

Russian ice hockey player

- Born: 24 July 1978 (age 47) Moscow, Soviet Union
- Height: 6 ft 0 in (183 cm)
- Weight: 191 lb (87 kg; 13 st 9 lb)
- Position: Defence
- Shot: Left
- Played for: New York Islanders; Lokomotiv Yaroslavl; Severstal Cherepovets; HC Dynamo Moscow; Metallurg Novokuznetsk; SKA Saint Petersburg; Torpedo Nizhny Novgorod; HC Neftekhimik Nizhnekamsk; HC Lada Togliatti
- NHL draft: 192nd overall, 1996; New York Islanders; 182nd overall, 1998; New York Islanders
- Playing career: 1994–2014

Yevgeni Stepanovich Korolyov (Russian: Евгений Степанович Королёв born 24 July 1978) is a Russian former professional ice hockey defenceman.

== Career ==
Korolev played 42 games in the National Hockey League with the New York Islanders between 1999 and 2002. The rest of his career, which lasted from 1994 to 2014, was mainly in the Russian Superleague and Kontinental Hockey League. After retiring he turned to coaching.

== Career statistics ==
=== Regular season and playoffs ===
			Regular season					Playoffs
Season	Team	League	GP	G	A	Pts	PIM	GP	G	A	Pts	PIM
1994–95	HC CSKA Moscow-2	RUS-2	15	0	1	1	2	—	—	—	—	—
1995–96	Peterborough Petes	OHL	60	2	12	14	60	6	0	0	0	2
1996–97	Peterborough Petes	OHL	64	5	17	22	60	11	1	1	2	8
1997–98	Peterborough Petes	OHL	37	5	21	26	39	—	—	—	—	—
1997–98	London Knights	OHL	27	4	10	14	36	15	2	7	9	29
1998–99	Lowell Lock Monsters	AHL	54	2	6	8	48	2	0	1	1	0
1998–99	Roanoke Express	ECHL	2	0	1	1	0	—	—	—	—	—
1999–00	New York Islanders	NHL	17	1	2	3	8	—	—	—	—	—
1999–00	Lowell Lock Monsters	AHL	57	1	10	11	61	6	0	0	0	4
2000–01	New York Islanders	NHL	8	0	0	0	6	—	—	—	—	—
2000–01	Louisville Panthers	AHL	36	2	14	16	68	—	—	—	—	—
2000–01	Chicago Wolves	IHL	4	0	1	1	0	—	—	—	—	—
2001–02	New York Islanders	NHL	17	0	2	2	6	2	0	0	0	0
2001–02	Bridgeport Sound Tigers	AHL	53	5	8	13	30	—	—	—	—	—
2002–03	Lokomotiv Yaroslavl	RSL	16	1	2	3	22	8	0	0	0	6
2002–03	Lokomotiv Yaroslavl-2	RUS-3	3	0	1	1	0	—	—	—	—	—
2003–04	Lokomotiv Yaroslavl	Russia	25	1	1	2	39	—	—	—	—	—
2003–04	Severstal Cherepovets	RSL	22	1	5	6	20	—	—	—	—	—
2004–05	Severstal Cherepovets	RSL	58	5	14	19	72	—	—	—	—	—
2005–06	HC Dynamo Moscow	RSL	45	7	6	13	86	1	0	0	0	0
2006–07	HC Dynamo Moscow	RSL	17	1	0	1	28	3	0	1	1	18
2006–07	HC Dynamo Moscow-2	RUS-3	5	2	3	5	6	—	—	—	—	—
2007–08	Metallurg Novokuznetsk	RSL	57	4	13	17	86	—	—	—	—	—
2008–09	SKA St. Petersburg	KHL	18	1	2	3	12	2	0	1	1	4
2009–10	Torpedo Nizhny Novgorod	KHL	38	1	18	19	34	—	—	—	—	—
2010–11	Torpedo Nizhny Novgorod	KHL	31	2	8	10	42	—	—	—	—	—
2010–11	OHK Dynamo Moscow	KHL	5	0	1	1	4	—	—	—	—	—
2011–12	HC Neftekhimik Nizhnekamsk	KHL	46	1	8	9	44	—	—	—	—	—
2013–14	HC Lada Togliatti	KHL	20	1	5	6	18	6	1	4	5	8
NHL totals			42	1	4	5	20	2	0	0	0	0
RSL/KHL totals			378	25	78	103	489	14	0	2	2	28
