= Dan Tessier =

Canadian ice hockey player

- Born: January 3, 1979 (age 47) Orléans, Ontario, Canada
- Height: 5 ft 9 in (175 cm)
- Weight: 180 lb (82 kg; 12 st 12 lb)
- Position: Centre
- Shot: Left
- Played for: ECHL; Louisiana IceGators; Columbus Cottonmouths; Fresno Falcons; HOL; Amstel Tijgers; DEL2; Fischtown Pinguins; AHL; Toronto Roadrunners; EIHL; Nottingham Panthers; Sheffield Steelers; SUI-B; HC Lausanne; DEL; Füchse Duisburg; IHL; Kalamazoo Wings
- Playing career: 2000–2012

Dan Tessier (born January 3, 1979) is a Canadian retired professional ice hockey centre who last played for the Nottingham Panthers of the British Elite Ice Hockey League (EIHL).

He was featured in the first season of Making the Cut: Last Man Standing, a hockey-based reality show which aired in 2004.

== Playing career ==
Tessier played major junior in the Ontario Hockey League (OHL) where he served as a team captain for the Ottawa 67's. Establishing his success with faceoffs as a top aspect of his game, he was awarded the OHL Top Faceoff Award in the trophy's inaugural three years through 1998 to 2000, as well as the CHL Top Faceoff Award in 1999. After an 84-point season in 1998–99, Tessier led the 67's to a Memorial Cup championship as the tournament hosts. In his fourth and final year with the 67's, he was named to the OHL First All-Star Team, earned the OHL Humanitarian of the Year for his humanitarian efforts and won Leo Lalonde Memorial Trophy as the OHL's best overage player with a second consecutive 84-point season.

Undrafted by a National Hockey League (NHL) club, Tessier earned an invite to the Montreal Canadiens training camp in 2000. He spent his professional rookie season in the East Coast Hockey League (ECHL) with the Louisiana IceGators, recording 35 points in 60 games. The following season, he earned another NHL training camp invite with the Ottawa Senators. Tessier spent the 2001–02 season, however, overseas in the Holland Super League with the Amstel Tijgers where he finished second in league scoring with 43 points in 33 games, as well as first in playoff scoring.

Tessier subsequently bounced between the North American minor professional leagues in the American Hockey League (AHL) and ECHL as well as the European leagues, such as the German 2nd Bundesliga (DEL2), and Deutsche Eishockey Liga (DEL), the Swiss Nationalliga B (SUI-B), and the British Elite Ice Hockey League (EIHL).

In 2004, he competed in the CBC's inaugural season of Making the Cut, a hockey-based reality show in which contestants compete for a spot on one of the six Canadian NHL teams.

On April 6, 2009, Tessier retired from his professional ice hockey career after the Nottingham Panthers' Elite League playoff defeat against Sheffield Steelers.

== Hockey camps ==
In 2002, Tessier branched out by opening his own hockey instruction school for youths during the summer.

== Awards ==
- Won the OHL Top Faceoff Award in 1998, 1999 and 2000.
- Won the CHL's Top Faceoff Award in 1999.
- Won the Memorial Cup with the Ottawa 67's in 1999.
- Won the OHL Humanitarian of the Year in 2000.
- Won the Leo Lalonde Memorial Trophy in 2000.
- Named to the OHL First All-Star Team in 2000.

== Career statistics ==
			Regular season					Playoffs
Season	Team	League	GP	G	A	Pts	PIM	GP	G	A	Pts	PIM
1995–96	Cumberland Grads	CJHL	52	31	52	83	87	—	—	—	—	—
1996–97	Ottawa 67's	OHL	62	22	27	49	43	22	1	6	7	10
1997–98	Ottawa 67's	OHL	66	28	37	65	55	14	7	12	19	12
1998–99	Ottawa 67's	OHL	69	36	48	84	64	8	0	2	2	10
1999–2000	Ottawa 67's	OHL	55	39	45	84	66	6	2	2	4	14
2000–01	Louisiana IceGators	ECHL	60	20	15	35	116	14	3	6	9	10
2001–02	Amsterdam Tigers	NLD	33	23	20	43	116	6	7	3	10	8
2002–03	Fischtown Pinguins	DEU.2	54	19	28	47	115	—	—	—	—	—
2003–04	Toronto Roadrunners	AHL	34	4	11	15	20	—	—	—	—	—
2003–04	Columbus Cottonmouths	ECHL	34	12	29	41	32	—	—	—	—	—
2004–05	Fresno Falcons	ECHL	60	25	34	59	114	—	—	—	—	—
2005–06	Nottingham Panthers	EIHL	19	11	15	26	42	—	—	—	—	—
2005–06	Lausanne HC	CHE.2	20	12	13	25	48	12	5	10	15	20
2006–07	Sheffield Steelers	EIHL	52	19	65	84	145	2	1	3	4	10
2007–08	Füchse Duisburg	DEL	19	0	6	6	14	—	—	—	—	—
2007–08	Kalamazoo Wings	IHL	20	5	10	15	32	—	—	—	—	—
2007–08	Sheffield Steelers	EIHL	18	11	16	27	16	4	4	2	6	10
2008–09	Nottingham Panthers	EIHL	46	18	48	66	83	4	2	2	4	8
2010–11	Akwesasne Warriors	FHL	13	12	20	32	23	7	8	9	17	2
2011–12	Akwesasne Warriors	FHL	11	6	15	21	31	3	3	3	6	2
ECHL totals			154	57	78	135	262	14	3	6	9	10
EIHL totals			135	59	144	203	286	10	7	7	14	28
