= Scott Levins =

American ice hockey player (born 1970)

- Born: January 30, 1970 (age 56) Spokane, Washington, U.S.
- Height: 6 ft 4 in (193 cm)
- Weight: 210 lb (95 kg; 15 st 0 lb)
- Position: Right wing
- Shot: Right
- Played for: Winnipeg Jets; Florida Panthers; Ottawa Senators; Phoenix Coyotes
- NHL draft: 75th overall, 1990; Winnipeg Jets
- Playing career: 1990–2004

Scott M. Levins (born January 30, 1970) is an American former professional ice hockey player. Levins was born in Spokane, Washington.

== Playing career ==
After a successful junior career with the WHL's Tri-City Americans, Levins was selected by the Winnipeg Jets in the 1990 NHL entry draft.

At the NHL level, Levins was used primarily as a grinder and physical presence, as he had difficulty replicating the offensive numbers he had produced in the minors. Levins ultimately played in only nine games in Winnipeg, spending the majority of his time with their farm team, the Moncton Hawks. He was claimed by the Florida Panthers in the 1993 NHL Expansion Draft and after 29 games was dealt to the Ottawa Senators in 1994 in a multi-player deal which saw Bob Kudelski going to Florida. It was in Ottawa that Levins would spend the majority of his NHL career. He would later play briefly with the Phoenix Coyotes before his NHL career came to an end, and he played the rest of his professional career in the minors (IHL, AHL and UHL) and then in Germany (DEL) for Kassel Huskies, Eisbären Berlin and Revierlöwen Oberhausen before heading to the British Ice Hockey Superleague to play for the Sheffield Steelers. He played his last professional season in 2003–04 splitting his time between Columbus Stars of the UHL and the Guildford Flames of the BNL where he won a Play-off Championship.

== Career statistics ==
=== Regular season and playoffs ===
			Regular season					Playoffs
Season	Team	League	GP	G	A	Pts	PIM	GP	G	A	Pts	PIM
1987–88	Spokane Braves	KIJHL	42	49	59	108	180	—	—	—	—	—
1988–89	Penticton Knights	BCJHL	50	27	58	85	154	—	—	—	—	—
1989–90	Tri-City Americans	WHL	71	25	37	62	132	6	2	3	5	18
1990–91	Moncton Hawks	AHL	74	12	26	38	133	4	0	0	0	4
1991–92	Moncton Hawks	AHL	69	15	18	33	271	11	3	4	7	30
1992–93	Winnipeg Jets	NHL	9	0	1	1	18	—	—	—	—	—
1992–93	Moncton Hawks	AHL	54	22	26	48	158	5	1	3	4	14
1993–94	Florida Panthers	NHL	29	5	6	11	69	—	—	—	—	—
1993–94	Ottawa Senators	NHL	33	3	5	8	93	—	—	—	—	—
1994–95	Ottawa Senators	NHL	24	5	6	11	51	—	—	—	—	—
1994–95	Prince Edward Island Senators	AHL	6	0	4	4	14	—	—	—	—	—
1995–96	Ottawa Senators	NHL	24	0	2	2	80	—	—	—	—	—
1995–96	Detroit Vipers	IHL	9	0	0	0	19	—	—	—	—	—
1996–97	Springfield Falcons	AHL	68	24	23	47	267	11	5	4	9	37
1997–98	Phoenix Coyotes	NHL	2	0	0	0	5	—	—	—	—	—
1997–98	Springfield Falcons	AHL	79	28	39	67	177	4	2	0	2	24
1998–99	Beast of New Haven	AHL	80	32	26	58	189	—	—	—	—	—
1999–00	Revierlöwen Oberhausen	DEL	37	12	11	23	80	—	—	—	—	—
1999–00	Quad City Mallards	UHL	11	4	4	8	46	—	—	—	—	—
2000–01	Kassel Huskies	DEL	59	17	14	31	137	8	2	3	5	10
2001–02	Eisbären Berlin	DEL	51	11	7	18	122	4	0	0	0	2
2002–03	Sheffield Steelers	BISL	25	12	10	22	73	14	3	3	6	8
2003–04	Columbus Stars	UHL	24	8	14	22	25	—	—	—	—	—
2003–04	Guildford Flames	BNL	10	7	4	11	28	11	4	1	5	28
NHL totals			124	13	20	33	316	—	—	—	—	—

== Awards ==
- WHL West Second All-Star Team – 1990
