= Colin Beardsmore =

Canadian ice hockey player (born 1978)

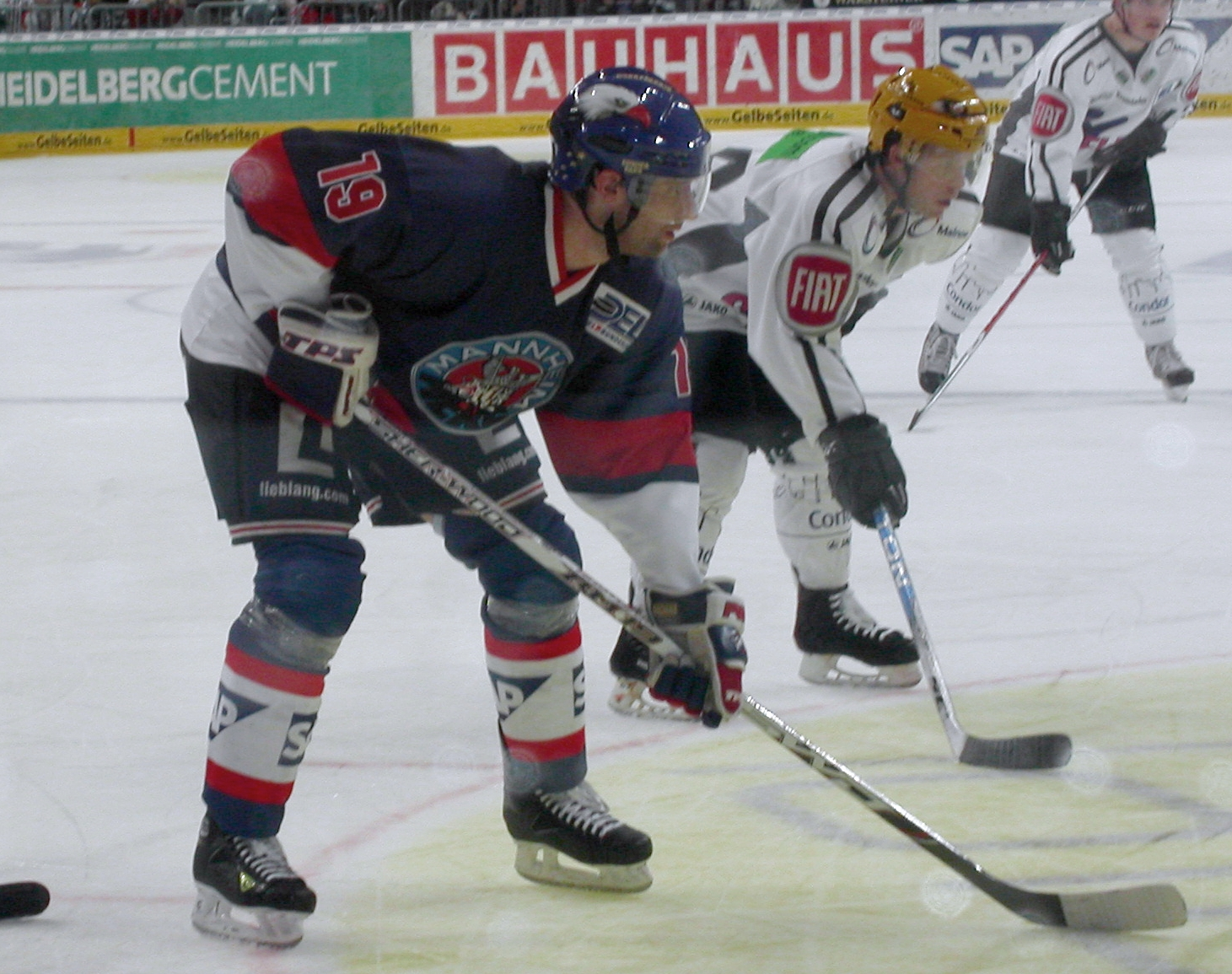
- Colin Beardsmore
- Born: February 7, 1978 (age 48) Peterborough, Ontario, Canada
- Height: 6 ft 2 in (188 cm)
- Weight: 207 lb (94 kg; 14 st 11 lb)
- Position: Right wing
- Shot: Left
- Played for: AHL; Adirondack Red Wings; DEL; Iserlohn Roosters; Augsburger Panther; Kölner Haie; Thomas Sabo Ice Tigers; Kassel Huskies; Adler Mannheim; Grizzly Adams Wolfsburg
- NHL draft: 189th overall, 1996; Detroit Red Wings
- Playing career: 1998–2012

Colin Beardsmore (born February 7, 1978) is a Canadian former professional ice hockey player. He last played for the Grizzly Adams Wolfsburg in the Deutsche Eishockey Liga (DEL). He was selected by the Detroit Red Wings in the 7th round (189th overall) of the 1996 NHL entry draft.

== Career statistics ==
			Regular season					Playoffs
Season	Team	League	GP	G	A	Pts	PIM	GP	G	A	Pts	PIM
1994–95	Markham Waxers	OPJHL	47	19	46	65	44	—	—	—	—	—
1995–96	Detroit Whalers	OHL	40	6	8	14	4	—	—	—	—	—
1995–96	North Bay Centennials	OHL	25	6	4	10	23	—	—	—	—	—
1996–97	North Bay Centennials	OHL	40	21	21	42	19	—	—	—	—	—
1996–97	Owen Sound Platers	OHL	30	7	13	20	29	4	0	2	2	8
1997–98	Owen Sound Platers	OHL	65	24	46	70	51	11	3	4	7	4
1998–99	Adirondack Red Wings	AHL	17	0	1	1	2	—	—	—	—	—
1998–99	Toledo Storm	ECHL	52	22	35	57	33	7	4	2	6	2
1999–00	University of New Brunswick	CIAU	26	11	19	30	32	—	—	—	—	—
2000–01	Iserlohn Roosters	DEL	60	13	16	29	75	—	—	—	—	—
2001–02	Iserlohn Roosters	DEL	59	10	15	25	71	—	—	—	—	—
2002–03	Iserlohn Roosters	DEL	52	9	21	30	26	—	—	—	—	—
2003–04	Augsburger Panther	DEL	52	17	19	36	38	—	—	—	—	—
2004–05	Kölner Haie	DEL	52	10	16	26	42	7	2	0	2	4
2005–06	Nuremberg Ice Tigers	DEL	51	14	20	34	38	4	0	2	2	2
2006–07	Nuremberg Ice Tigers	DEL	52	18	17	35	46	13	1	3	4	0
2007–08	Nuremberg Ice Tigers	DEL	56	10	9	19	44	5	0	1	1	4
2008–09	Kassel Huskies	DEL	10	1	2	3	8	—	—	—	—	—
2008–09	Adler Mannheim	DEL	40	4	7	11	14	9	0	4	4	6
2009–10	Adler Mannheim	DEL	56	4	7	11	24	2	0	0	0	0
2010–11	Nuremberg Ice Tigers	DEL	51	4	8	12	18	2	1	0	1	0
2011–12	Grizzly Adams Wolfsburg	DEL	52	4	18	22	10	4	1	0	1	4
DEL totals			643	118	175	293	454	46	5	10	15	24
