= Michal Dvořák =

Czech ice hockey player

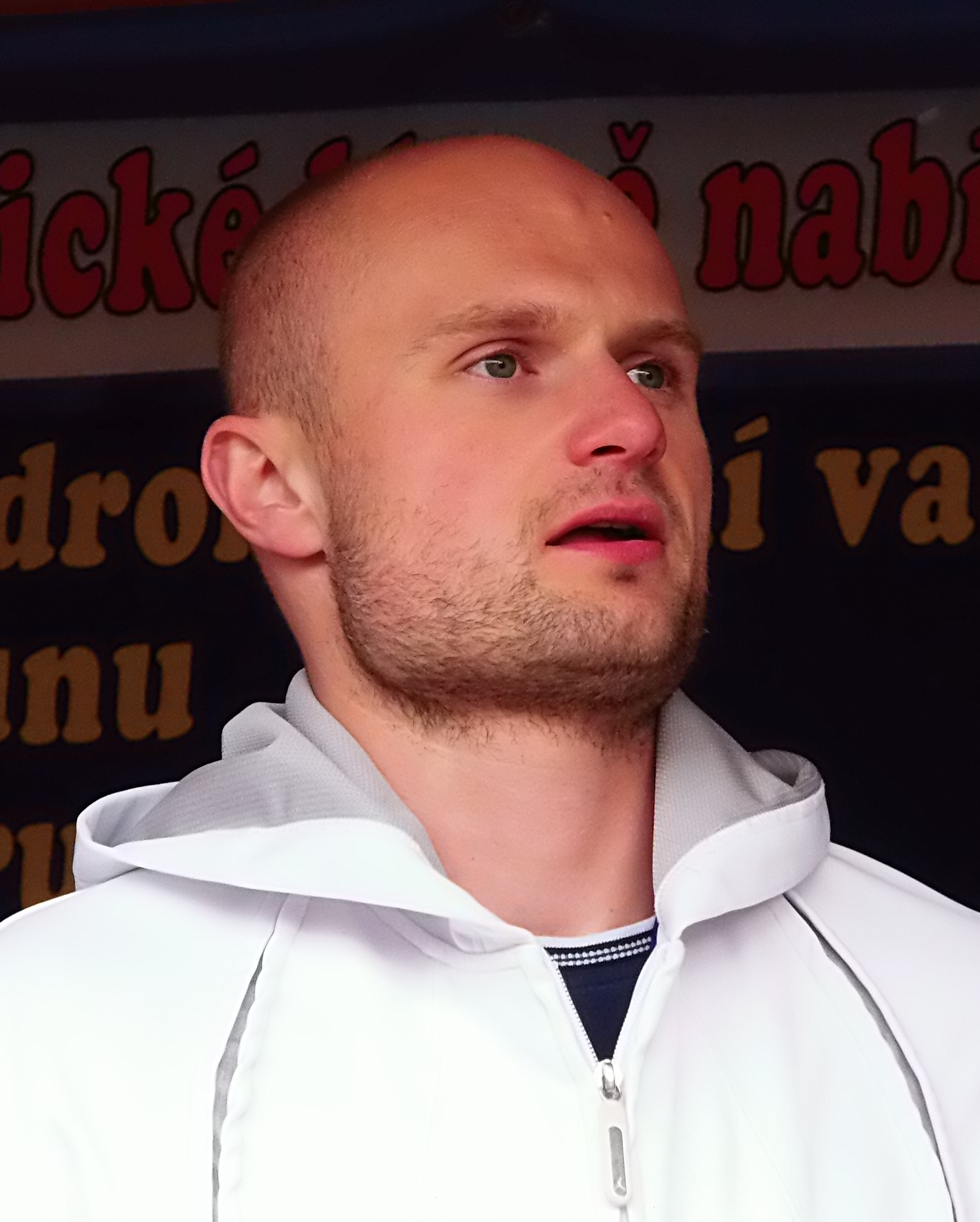
- portrait of Michal Dvořák in 2014
- Born: 12 August 1979 (age 46) Šternberk, Czechoslovakia
- Height: 6 ft 0 in (183 cm)
- Weight: 212 lb (96 kg; 15 st 2 lb)
- Position: Forward
- Shot: Left
- Czech Extraliga team: HC Plzeň
- Playing career: 1994–2015

Michal Dvořák (born 12 August 1979) is a former Czech professional ice hockey player. He played for HC Plzeň in the Czech Extraliga during most of his career.

Dvořák previously played for HC Olomouc, Kitchener Rangers and HC Energie Karlovy Vary.
