= Craig Hillier =

Canadian ice hockey player (born 1978)

- Born: February 28, 1978 (age 48) Cole Harbour, Nova Scotia, Canada
- Height: 6 ft 1 in (185 cm)
- Weight: 185 lb (84 kg; 13 st 3 lb)
- Position: Goaltender
- Caught: Left
- Played for: Syracuse Crunch (AHL); Wilkes-Barre/Scranton Penguins (AHL); Johnstown Chiefs (ECHL); Charlotte Checkers (ECHL); Toledo Storm (ECHL); Wheeling Nailers (ECHL); Columbus Stars (UHL); Corpus Christi Rayz (CHL)
- NHL draft: 23rd overall, 1996; Pittsburgh Penguins
- Playing career: 1998–2004

Craig Hillier (born February 28, 1978) is a Canadian former professional ice hockey goaltender. He was drafted in the first round, 23rd overall, by the Pittsburgh Penguins in the 1996 NHL entry draft.

== Career ==
Born in Cole Harbour, Nova Scotia, Canada, Hillier started playing as a goaltender when he was six years old. He found his cousin's equipment and thought "how cool it was" to play goaltender

After four seasons in the Ontario Hockey League with the Ottawa 67's, Hillier turned pro in 1998. Hillier made his professional debut against the then-Stanley Cup champions Detroit Red Wings in a preseason game as a member of the Pittsburgh Penguins in September 1998. Hillier initially started the game as the backup goaltender, but the starting goaltender was injured several minutes into the game. Hillier lost his debut at Joe Louis Arena by the score of 3–2. Shortly after, Hillier was reassigned to Pittsburgh's AHL affiliate in Syracuse, where he was immediately placed into the role of starting goaltender.

He then played in the ECHL, playing for four teams in two seasons, playing for the Johnstown Chiefs, Charlotte Checkers, Toledo Storm and the Wheeling Nailers. Hillier then had a spell in the Netherlands before returning to North America, playing in the United Hockey League for the Columbus Stars and in the Central Hockey League with the Corpus Christi Rayz before retiring in 2004.

== Personal ==
Hillier has returned to the Halifax area since his retirement and is involved in several ventures. He and Brad MacCharles are the founding partners of Outlaw Goaltending, a goaltending camp based in the Halifax area. Hillier has also started his own real estate company that has been in operation since 2005. During the 2009–10 season, Hillier was also the goaltending coach for the Saint Mary's Huskies Women's Hockey Team, helping them to their first Conference championship in 6 years, which also led them to play in the national AUHC tournament

== Awards ==
=== OHL ===
- 1995–96 1st Team All-Star
- 1995–96 Goaltender Of The Year
- 1996–97 Dave Pinkney Trophy (Lowest Team GAA
- 1997–98 Dave Pinkney Trophy (Lowest Team GAA)
- 1997–98 Lowest Individual GAA

=== Eredivisie (Netherlands) ===
- 2002–03 All-Star Team

| Preceded by Aleksey Morozov | Pittsburgh Penguins first-round draft pick 1996 | Succeeded by Róbert Döme |
