= Chris Madden (ice hockey) =

American ice hockey player (born 1978)

- Born: March 27, 1978 (age 48) Liverpool, New York, U.S.
- Height: 6 ft 0 in (183 cm)
- Weight: 187 lb (85 kg; 13 st 5 lb)
- Position: Goaltender
- Shot: Left
- Played for: Hamilton Bulldogs; Milwaukee Admirals; Toronto Roadrunners; Providence Bruins; Bridgeport Sound Tigers
- NHL draft: 96th overall, 1998; Carolina Hurricanes
- Playing career: 2000–2006

Chris Madden (born March 27, 1978) is an American former professional ice hockey goalie.

== Career ==
Before turning pro, Madden played for the Guelph Storm of the Ontario Hockey League, where he won the Hap Emms Memorial Trophy as the top goaltender during the Memorial Cup in 1998 and the Stafford Smythe Memorial Trophy as the Memorial Cup MVP. He was also named to the 1998 Memorial Cup All-Star team.

Madden was drafted by the Carolina Hurricanes 97th overall in the 1998 NHL entry draft.
