= Columbus Stars =

- City: Columbus, Ohio
- League: United Hockey League
- Division: Eastern Division
- Founded: 2003
- Home arena: Ohio Expo Center Coliseum
- Colors: Navy, red, white
- Owner: Joe Milano Jr

Franchise history
- 2003–2004: Columbus Stars

The Columbus Stars were a minor professional ice hockey team that was a brief member of the United Hockey League (UHL). The team folded before the midway point of 2003–04 season, in which the Stars had 21 home games drawing an average of only 973 people per game, 2,000 less than the UHL average. They played their home games at the Ohio Expo Center Coliseum which had a capacity of 5,676. Despite leading the Eastern Conference of the UHL at the time of its demise, the team's final game had an attendance of only 732. The team folded on January 9, 2004.

The team was owned by Joe Milano Jr, a local Columbus restaurateur. The stars gained attention after Rescue Me actor Denis Leary was offered a one-game contract to play with the team. He would have been paid the standard one-game salary for a UHL player ($300) and an undisclosed percentage of the ticket sales from the game would have been donated to his charity, Leary Firefighters Foundation.

== Notable players ==
- Evan Cheverie
- Craig Hillier
- Scott Levins
