= 2007–08 Serie A (ice hockey) season =

Italian professional ice hockey season

The 2007–08 Serie A season was the 74th season of the Serie A, the top level of ice hockey in Italy. Nine teams participated in the league, and HC Bolzano won the championship by defeating SV Ritten in the final.

== First round ==
Place	Team	GP	Pts	W	L	T	Goals	Diff
1	Ritten Sport	32	44	20	8	4	112:74	+38
2	SHC Fassa	32	35	14	11	7	123:101	+22
3	HC Bolzano	32	35	14	11	7	88:78	+10
4	HC Milano Vipers	32	34	13	11	8	100:88	+12
5	HC Pustertal	32	32	12	12	8	90:98	-8
6	HC Alleghe	32	30	10	12	10	96:97	-1
7	SG Pontebba	32	29	9	12	11	86:93	-7
8	SG Cortina	32	27	11	16	5	76:87	-11
9	AS Asiago Hockey	32	22	7	17	8	82:137	-55

== Second round ==
=== Placing round ===
Place	Team	GP	Pts	W	L	T	Goals	Diff
1	Ritten Sport	38	29	23	10	5	138:97	+41
2	HC Milano Vipers	38	27	17	11	10	128:102	+26
3	HC Bolzano	38	23	17	14	7	102:98	+4
4	SHC Fassa	38	18	14	16	8	135:124	+11

=== Qualification round ===
Place	Team	GP	Pts	W	L	T	Goals	Diff
5	SG Cortina	40	25	16	17	7	113:102	+11
6	HC Alleghe	40	25	14	14	12	132:129	+3
7	SG Pontebba	40	24	14	15	11	111:112	-1
8	HC Pustertal	40	22	15	17	8	120:140	-20
9	AS Asiago Hockey	40	13	7	23	10	104:179	-75

== Playoffs ==
=== Quarterfinals ===
Series	Standing	Game 1	Game 2	Game 3	Game 4	Game 5
Ritten Sport (1) - HC Pustertal (8)	3:1	4:1 (1:1, 1:0, 2:1)	5:4 n.V. (1:1, 2:1, 1:2, 1:0)	2:3 n.V. (0:1,1:0,1:1,0:1)	2:1 (1:0, 1:1, 0:0)	
HC Milano Vipers (2) - SG Pontebba (7)	3:2	4:3 (3:1, 1:2, 0:0)	2:4 (0:2, 1:0, 1:2)	3:5 (1:2, 2:1, 0:2)	3:1 (1:0, 1:0, 1:1)	2:3 (0:2, 1:1, 1:0)
HC Bolzano (3) - HC Alleghe (6)	3:1	4:5 n.P. (2:1, 1:1, 1:2, 0:0, 0:1)	4:3 n.P. (1:0, 1:2, 1:1, 0:0, 1:0)	3:2 (1:0, 1:2, 1:0)	2:1 (1:0, 1:1, 0:0)	
SHC Fassa (4) - SG Cortina (5)	3:0	5:1 (2:0, 3:1, 0:0)	6:3 (3:2, 2:1, 1:0)	4:1 (0:0, 3:1, 1:0)		

=== Semifinals ===
Series	Standing	Game 1	Game 2	Game 3	Game 4	Game 5
Ritten Sport (1) - SHC Fassa (4)	3:2	2:1 n.P. (1:0, 0:0, 0:1, 0:0, 1:0)	2:8 (0:2, 1:3, 1:3)	6:7 (3:1, 1:1, 2:5)	5:2 (1:2, 1:0, 3:0)	3:0 (1:0, 0:0, 2:0)
HC Milano Vipers (2) - HC Bolzano (3)	1:3	5:0 (0:0, 4:0, 1:0)	2:3 (0:0, 2:2, 0:1)	3:4 n.V. (1:0, 1:1, 1:2, 0:1)	2:4 (1:3, 1:1, 0:0)	

=== Final ===
Series	Standing	Game 1	Game 2	Game 3	Game 4	Game 5
SV Ritten (1) - HC Bolzano (3)	1:3	5:2 (3:1, 1:0, 1:1)	3:4 (1:0, 0:1, 2:3)	1:3 (0:1, 1:2, 0:0)	1:5 (1:1, 0:1, 0:3)	
