= CHL Humanitarian of the Year =

Annual award to a Canadian Hockey League player

CHL Humanitarian of the Year Award
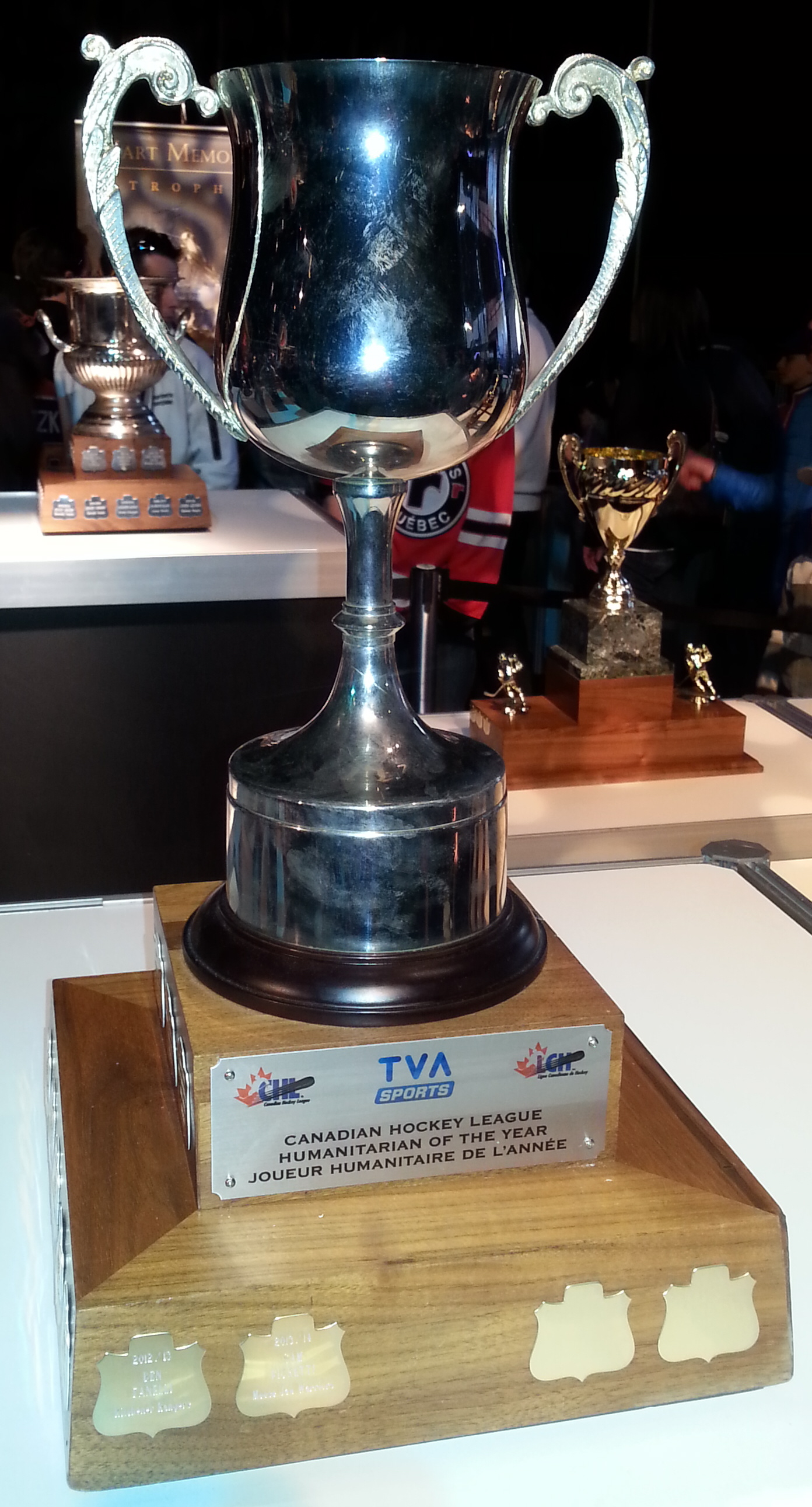
- Sport: Ice hockey
- Awarded for: Annually to the Canadian Hockey League player judged to have made the most notable contribution to his community in a humanitarian sense

History
- First award: 1993
- First winner: Keli Corpse
- Most recent: Marcus Kearsey

The CHL Humanitarian of the Year Award is given out annually to the Canadian Hockey League player judged to have made the most notable contribution to his community in a humanitarian sense. It is chosen from the winners of the QMJHL Humanitarian of the Year, the Dan Snyder Memorial Trophy (OHL), or the Doug Wickenheiser Memorial Trophy (WHL).

== Winners ==
List of winners of the CHL Humanitarian of the Year Award.

Season	Winner	Team	League
1992–93	Keli Corpse	Kingston Frontenacs	OHL
1993–94	Stephane Roy	Val-d'Or Foreurs	QMJHL
1994–95	David-Alexandre Beauregard	Saint-Hyacinthe Laser	QMJHL
1995–96	Craig Mills	Belleville Bulls	OHL
1996–97	Jesse Wallin	Red Deer Rebels	WHL
1997–98	Jason Metcalfe	London Knights	OHL
1998–99	Philippe Sauve	Rimouski Océanic	QMJHL
1999–2000	Simon Gamache	Val-d'Or Foreurs	QMJHL
2000–01	Jim Vandermeer	Red Deer Rebels	WHL
2001–02	Brandin Cote	Spokane Chiefs	WHL
2002–03	Ryan Craig	Brandon Wheat Kings	WHL
2003–04	Chris Campoli	Erie Otters	OHL
2004–05	Colin Fraser	Red Deer Rebels	WHL
2005–06	Mike Angelidis	Owen Sound Attack	OHL
2006–07	Kyle Moir	Swift Current Broncos	WHL
2007–08	Chris Morehouse	Moncton Wildcats	QMJHL
2008–09	Matthew Pistilli	Shawinigan Cataractes	QMJHL
2009–10	Ryan Hayes	Plymouth Whalers	OHL
2010–11	Spencer Edwards	Moose Jaw Warriors	WHL
2011–12	Vincent Barnard	Quebec Remparts	QMJHL
2012–13	Ben Fanelli	Kitchener Rangers	OHL
2013–14	Sam Fioretti	Moose Jaw Warriors	WHL
2014–15	Danick Martel	Blainville-Boisbriand Armada	QMJHL
2015–16	Will Petschenig	Saginaw Spirit	OHL
2016–17	Tyler Wong	Lethbridge Hurricanes	WHL
2017–18	Garrett McFadden	Guelph Storm	OHL
2018–19	Charle-Edouard D'Astous	Rimouski Océanic	QMJHL
2019–20	Xavier Simoneau	Drummondville Voltigeurs	QMJHL
2020–21	Not awarded due to COVID-19 pandemic		
2021–22	Luke Prokop	Edmonton Oil Kings	WHL
2022–23	Dalyn Wakely	North Bay Battalion	OHL
2023–24	Mason Vaccari	Kingston Frontenacs	OHL
2024–25	Maxwell Jardine	Charlottetown Islanders	QMJHL
2025–26	Marcus Kearsey	Charlottetown Islanders	QMJHL

== See also ==
- List of Canadian Hockey League awards
