= Colin Fraser (ice hockey) =

Canadian ice hockey player (born 1985)

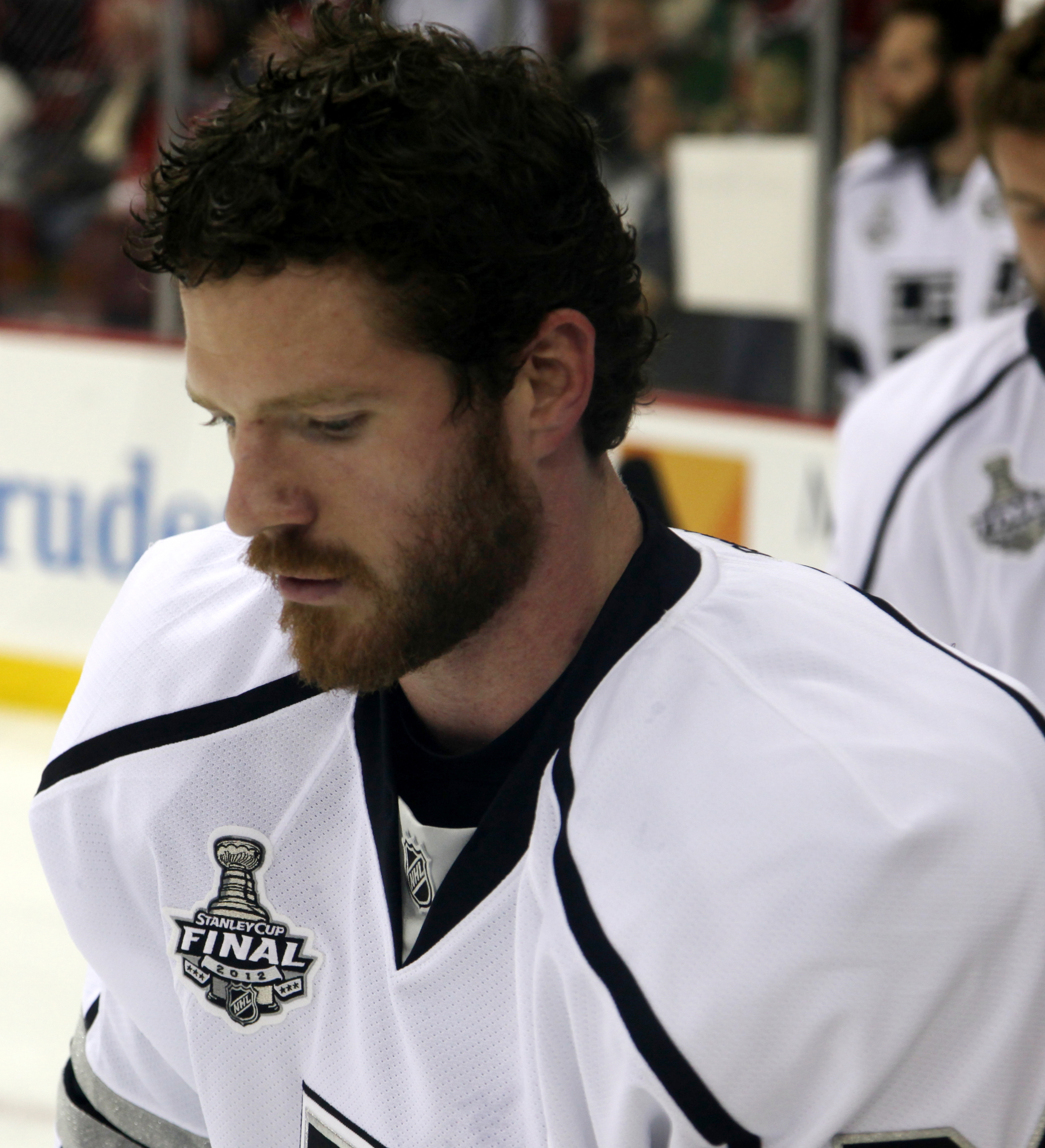
- Fraser with the Los Angeles Kings during the 2012 Stanley Cup Final
- Born: January 28, 1985 (age 41) Sicamous, British Columbia, Canada
- Height: 6 ft 1 in (185 cm)
- Weight: 193 lb (88 kg; 13 st 11 lb)
- Position: Centre/Left wing
- Shot: Left
- Played for: Chicago Blackhawks; Edmonton Oilers; Los Angeles Kings; St. Louis Blues; Thomas Sabo Ice Tigers
- NHL draft: 69th overall, 2003; Philadelphia Flyers
- Playing career: 2005–2015

Colin Fraser (born January 28, 1985) is a Canadian former professional ice hockey centre. He played in the National Hockey League for the Chicago Blackhawks, Edmonton Oilers, Los Angeles Kings and the St. Louis Blues. Fraser is a two-time Stanley Cup champion, having won the Cup with the Blackhawks in 2010, and the Kings in 2012. Fraser was a part of the Kings for the 2014 championship, but did not qualify to have his name engraved on the Stanley Cup that year. After retiring from professional hockey in 2015, Fraser returned to the Blackhawks to work in their scouting department.

== Playing career ==
=== Minor/Junior ===
Fraser was born in Sicamous, but raised in Surrey, British Columbia. Growing up, he played minor hockey with the Pacific Vipers of Vancouver with future Chicago Blackhawks teammates Brent Seabrook, Andrew Ladd and Troy Brouwer. He went on to play major junior in the Western Hockey League (WHL) with the Red Deer Rebels for four years. He spent time as their team captain. Following a 52-point campaign in his second WHL season, Fraser was drafted in the third round, 69th overall, by the Philadelphia Flyers in the 2003 NHL entry draft. In the subsequent season after being drafted by the Flyers, Fraser was traded to the Chicago Blackhawks on February 19, 2004, while still in the WHL, along with Jim Vandermeer and a second round selection (Bryan Bickell) in 2004 in exchange for Alexei Zhamnov and a fourth round selection (R. J. Anderson) in 2004.

=== Professional ===
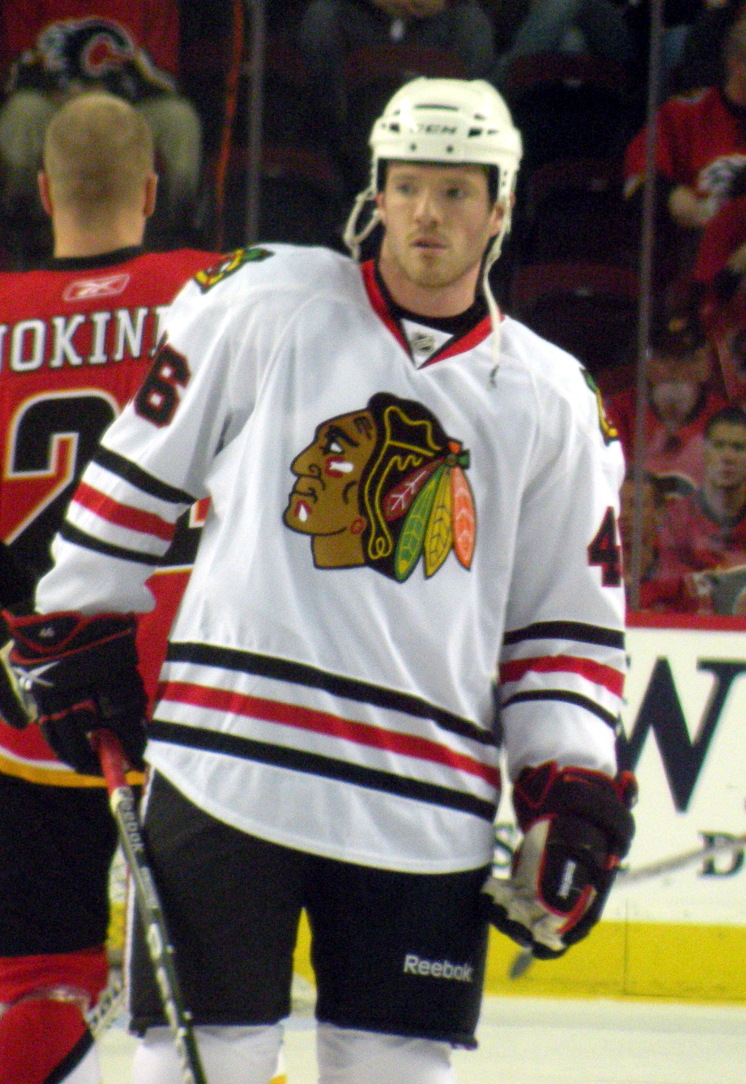
Fraser with the Chicago Blackhawks in April 2009

In the subsequent season after being drafted by the Flyers and while still in the WHL, Fraser was traded to the Chicago Blackhawks on February 19, 2004, along with Jim Vandermeer and a second-round draft pick (Bryan Bickell) in 2004 in exchange for Alexei Zhamnov and a 2004 fourth-round pick (R. J. Anderson).

Turning professional in 2004–05, Fraser made his debut with the Blackhawks' American Hockey League (AHL) affiliate, the Norfolk Admirals, appearing in a handful of games following the completion of his fourth and final WHL season. He remained in Norfolk for several seasons and made his NHL debut with the Blackhawks in 2006–07, dressing for one game. In 2007–08, the Rockford IceHogs became Chicago's AHL affiliate, where Fraser scored an AHL career-high 41 points while also playing in five games for the Blackhawks.

During the 2009–10 season, Fraser won the Stanley Cup while playing with the Chicago Blackhawks; he played in three playoff games in the 2010 playoffs (all in the first round against the Nashville Predators.

On June 24, 2010, it was announced that he was traded to the Edmonton Oilers in exchange for a 2010 sixth-round draft choice (Mirko Hoefflin).

On June 26, 2011, Fraser was traded by the Oilers to the Los Angeles Kings, along with a seventh-round pick in 2012, for Ryan Smyth. Fraser scored the Kings' first goal in Game 1 of the 2012 Stanley Cup Final against the New Jersey Devils, a 2–1 Kings overtime victory. He won his second Stanley Cup on June 11, 2012, with the Kings. He then signed a two-year, $1.65 million contract extension on June 23.

On February 8, 2014, the Kings placed Fraser on waivers for the purpose of demoting him to the Manchester Monarchs of the AHL. On April 22, the Kings then recalled Fraser during the first round of the 2014 Stanley Cup playoffs against the San Jose Sharks; however, he did not appear in enough regular season or playoff games to have his name engraved on the Stanley Cup upon their 2014 Stanley Cup Final win.

On September 5, 2014, the St. Louis Blues announced that they had signed Fraser to a one-year, two-way contract. He did not win a place with the Blues during training camp and, after clearing waivers, was assigned to the Chicago Wolves, their AHL affiliate. On December 31, 2014, Fraser was recalled by St. Louis from the Wolves and subsequently played his first game for the Blues against the Anaheim Ducks on January 2, 2015.

On June 16, 2015, as an impending free agent, Fraser continued his career in Europe, agreeing to a one-year contract with German club, the Thomas Sabo Ice Tigers of the Deutsche Eishockey Liga. In the midst of the 2015–16 season, Fraser had appeared in 17 games for the Ice Tigers, registering 5 assists, before opting to immediately retire from professional hockey for personal reasons on November 18, 2015.

After retiring from professional ice hockey, Fraser became an amateur scout for his former team, the Chicago Blackhawks.

== International play ==
Medal record

Representing Canada

Ice hockey

World Junior Championships
Gold medal – first place	2005 Grand Forks	

During his junior career, Fraser competed for Canada at the 2005 World Junior Championships in Grand Forks. He recorded five points in six games, helping Canada to a gold medal win against Russia in the Final. The gold medal marked Canada's first championship of a five-year run.

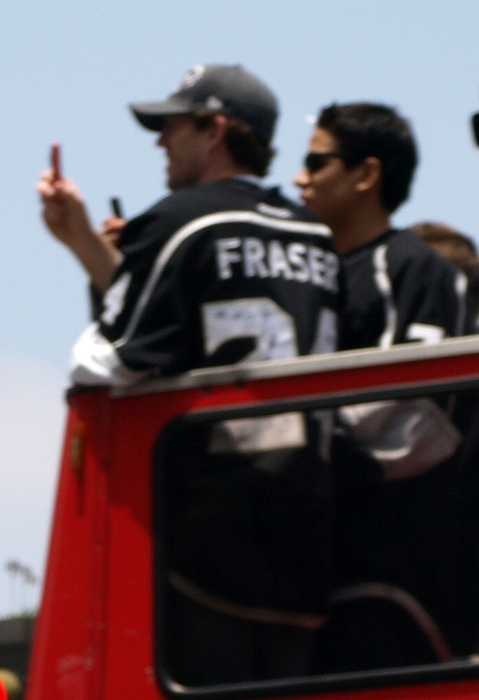
Fraser (left) and Jordan Nolan at the 2012 Stanley Cup parade.

== Career statistics ==
=== Regular season and playoffs ===
			Regular season					Playoffs
Season	Team	League	GP	G	A	Pts	PIM	GP	G	A	Pts	PIM
2000–01	Port Coquitlam Buckaroos	PIJHL	38	16	24	40	90	8	2	2	4	21
2001–02	Red Deer Rebels	WHL	67	11	31	42	126	23	2	1	3	39
2002–03	Red Deer Rebels	WHL	69	15	37	52	192	22	7	6	13	40
2003–04	Red Deer Rebels	WHL	70	24	29	53	174	19	5	9	14	24
2004–05	Red Deer Rebels	WHL	63	24	43	67	148	7	2	5	7	8
2004–05	Norfolk Admirals	AHL	3	0	0	0	20	6	1	0	1	2
2005–06	Norfolk Admirals	AHL	73	12	13	25	145	4	0	0	0	7
2006–07	Norfolk Admirals	AHL	67	12	24	36	158	6	1	0	1	21
2006–07	Chicago Blackhawks	NHL	1	0	0	0	2	—	—	—	—	—
2007–08	Rockford IceHogs	AHL	75	17	24	41	165	12	1	2	3	28
2007–08	Chicago Blackhawks	NHL	5	0	0	0	7	—	—	—	—	—
2008–09	Chicago Blackhawks	NHL	81	6	11	17	55	2	0	0	0	2
2009–10	Chicago Blackhawks	NHL	70	7	12	19	44	3	0	0	0	0
2010–11	Edmonton Oilers	NHL	67	3	2	5	60	—	—	—	—	—
2011–12	Los Angeles Kings	NHL	67	2	6	8	67	18	1	1	2	4
2012–13	Los Angeles Kings	NHL	34	2	5	7	25	16	0	2	2	10
2013–14	Los Angeles Kings	NHL	33	0	2	2	30	—	—	—	—	—
2013–14	Manchester Monarchs	AHL	10	3	3	6	4	—	—	—	—	—
2014–15	Chicago Wolves	AHL	59	9	8	17	67	5	1	0	1	4
2014–15	St. Louis Blues	NHL	1	0	0	0	0	—	—	—	—	—
2015–16	Thomas Sabo Ice Tigers	DEL	17	0	5	5	69	—	—	—	—	—
AHL totals			289	53	72	125	559	33	4	2	6	62
NHL totals			359	20	38	58	290	39	1	3	4	16

=== International ===
Year	Team	Event	Result	GP	G	A	Pts	PIM
2002	Canada Pacific	U17	2nd place, silver medalist(s)	6	1	0	1	6
2002	Canada	U18	1st place, gold medalist(s)	5	2	1	3	4
2005	Canada	WJC	1st place, gold medalist(s)	6	1	4	5	2
Junior totals				17	4	5	9	12

== Awards and honours ==
Award	Year
WHL
Doug Wickenheiser Memorial Trophy	2005
Humanitarian of the Year Award	2005
NHL
Stanley Cup champion	2010, 2012

Awards and achievements
Preceded by Chris Campoli	Winner of the CHL Humanitarian of the Year Award; 2005	Succeeded by Mike Angelidis
Preceded by Braydon Coburn	Winner of the WHL Doug Wickenheiser Memorial Trophy; 2005	Succeeded by Wacey Rabbit
