= Ryan Craig =

Canadian ice hockey player and coach

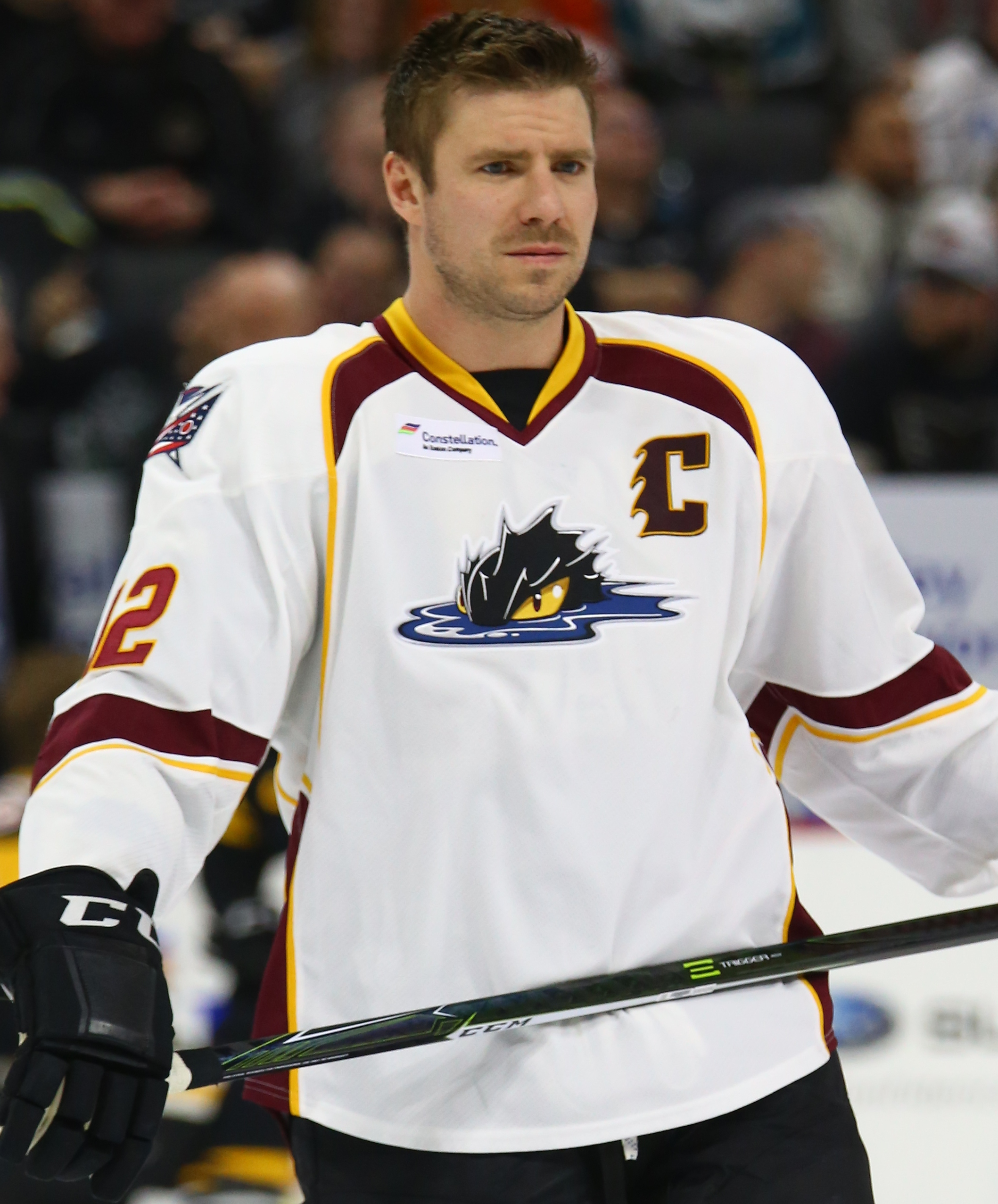
- Craig with the Cleveland Monsters in 2017
- Born: January 6, 1982 (age 44) Abbotsford, British Columbia, Canada
- Height: 6 ft 2 in (188 cm)
- Weight: 221 lb (100 kg; 15 st 11 lb)
- Position: Centre
- Shot: Left
- Played for: Tampa Bay Lightning; Pittsburgh Penguins; Columbus Blue Jackets
- Current NHL coach: Vegas Golden Knights
- NHL draft: 255th overall, 2002; Tampa Bay Lightning
- Playing career: 2003–2017

Ryan F. Craig (born January 6, 1982) is a Canadian professional ice hockey coach and former player who is the head coach for the Vegas Golden Knights of the National Hockey League (NHL). Prior to retirement, he played in the NHL for the Tampa Bay Lightning, Pittsburgh Penguins, and Columbus Blue Jackets, and served as the captain of the Cleveland Monsters in the American Hockey League (AHL). Craig was drafted 255th overall in the 2002 NHL entry draft by the Lightning.

== Playing career ==
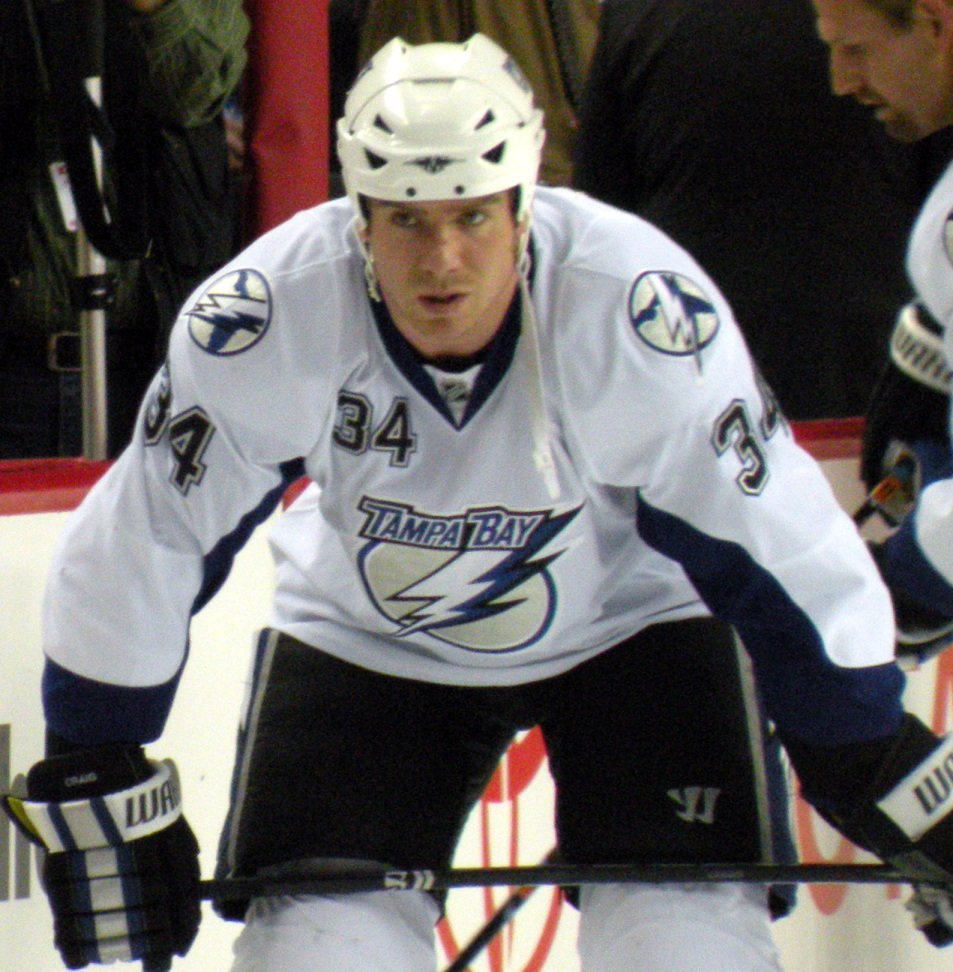
With the Lightning in 2009.

As a youth, Craig played in the 1996 Quebec International Pee-Wee Hockey Tournament with a minor ice hockey team from Abbotsford, British Columbia.

Craig started his junior ice hockey career with the Brandon Wheat Kings of the Western Hockey League and made his debut by appearing in one game in the 1997–98 season as a 16-year-old. In the 2000–01 season, Craig led Brandon in scoring and was named the team MVP the following year. Serving as a captain in his final two seasons in the WHL, Craig tied for the lead in scoring in the 2002–03 season, and ranked sixth in the WHL in goals, first in game-winning goals (11) and tied for eighth in power play goals.

After spending his first seven professional seasons within the Lightning organization, on July 3, 2010, Craig signed as a free agent to a two-way, 1-year $500,000 contract with the Pittsburgh Penguins. On June 13, 2011, Craig re-signed with the Penguins for one year.

After captaining the Penguins' AHL affiliate, the Wilkes-Barre/Scranton Penguins, for two seasons, Craig left the Penguins' organization. Unable to earn an NHL deal, he signed a one-year AHL contract with the Springfield Falcons on July 19, 2012.

Craig was selected as the Falcons' captain in his first season with the club, in 2012–13. He scored 20 goals and 47 points in 75 games to help Springfield reach the second round of the post-season. On July 5, 2013, Craig was signed to a two-year, two-way contract with the Falcons' NHL affiliate, the Columbus Blue Jackets.

On June 29, 2015, Craig continued his affiliation with the Blue Jackets, by signing a two-year contract with their new AHL affiliate, the Lake Erie Monsters. In his first season with the Monsters in 2015–16, Craig led the team as Captain in capturing their first Calder Cup championship.

== Coaching career ==
Craig joined the Vegas Golden Knights NHL expansion team as an assistant coach on June 9, 2017, and simultaneously retired from his playing career.

Craig served as an assistant coach for Vegas since the team's first season, and had served as an assistant coach for the team's first 6 seasons and for all three of Vegas' head coaches up to 2023 (Gerard Gallant, Peter DeBoer, and Bruce Cassidy). He won the Stanley Cup in 2023.

Nearly 2 weeks after winning the Stanley Cup on June 13, 2023, Craig was appointed as the head coach of Vegas' American Hockey League (AHL) affiliate, the Henderson Silver Knights, on June 26, 2023.

Three years later, on June 17, 2026, Craig was named head coach of Vegas, succeeding John Tortorella. In his first game as Vegas' head coach, the Golden Knights defeated the Chicago Blackhawks 5–2 to open the 2026–27 season.

== Personal life ==
Craig is married to Jaydee, who grew up in Souris, Manitoba. They have three children together.

== Career statistics ==
			Regular season					Playoffs
Season	Team	League	GP	G	A	Pts	PIM	GP	G	A	Pts	PIM
1997–98	Brandon Wheat Kings	WHL	1	0	0	0	0	—	—	—	—	—
1998–99	Brandon Wheat Kings	WHL	54	11	12	23	46	5	0	0	0	4
1999–00	Brandon Wheat Kings	WHL	65	17	19	36	40	—	—	—	—	—
2000–01	Brandon Wheat Kings	WHL	70	38	33	71	49	6	3	0	3	7
2001–02	Brandon Wheat Kings	WHL	52	29	35	64	52	19	11	10	21	13
2002–03	Brandon Wheat Kings	WHL	60	42	32	74	69	17	5	8	13	29
2003–04	Pensacola Ice Pilots	ECHL	5	3	5	8	0	2	0	1	1	0
2003–04	Hershey Bears	AHL	61	4	8	12	24	—	—	—	—	—
2004–05	Springfield Falcons	AHL	80	27	14	41	50	—	—	—	—	—
2005–06	Springfield Falcons	AHL	28	12	10	22	14	—	—	—	—	—
2005–06	Tampa Bay Lightning	NHL	48	15	13	28	6	5	0	0	0	10
2006–07	Tampa Bay Lightning	NHL	72	14	13	27	55	6	0	0	0	12
2007–08	Norfolk Admirals	AHL	2	1	2	3	2	—	—	—	—	—
2007–08	Tampa Bay Lightning	NHL	7	1	1	2	0	—	—	—	—	—
2008–09	Tampa Bay Lightning	NHL	54	2	4	6	60	—	—	—	—	—
2009–10	Norfolk Admirals	AHL	73	23	22	45	64	—	—	—	—	—
2009–10	Tampa Bay Lightning	NHL	3	0	0	0	5	—	—	—	—	—
2010–11	Wilkes-Barre/Scranton Penguins	AHL	71	19	29	48	84	12	3	4	7	12
2010–11	Pittsburgh Penguins	NHL	6	0	0	0	22	—	—	—	—	—
2011–12	Wilkes-Barre/Scranton Penguins	AHL	68	11	19	30	70	12	1	3	4	2
2012–13	Springfield Falcons	AHL	75	20	27	47	71	8	2	2	4	7
2013–14	Springfield Falcons	AHL	55	18	15	33	52	5	4	1	5	4
2013–14	Columbus Blue Jackets	NHL	6	0	0	0	0	—	—	—	—	—
2014–15	Springfield Falcons	AHL	67	17	20	37	60	—	—	—	—	—
2014–15	Columbus Blue Jackets	NHL	2	0	0	0	0	—	—	—	—	—
2015–16	Lake Erie Monsters	AHL	60	9	11	20	38	17	3	10	13	8
2016–17	Cleveland Monsters	AHL	71	11	11	22	25	—	—	—	—	—
AHL totals			711	172	188	360	554	54	13	20	33	33
NHL totals			198	32	31	63	148	11	0	0	0	22

== Awards and honours ==
Awards	Year	Ref
WHL
East First All-Star Team	2002–03	
Doug Wickenheiser Memorial Trophy	2002–03	
CHL's Humanitarian of the Year Award	2002–03	
AHL
Calder Cup champion	2016	
NHL
Stanley Cup champion (as assistant coach)	2023	

Awards and achievements
Preceded by Brandin Cote	Winner of the CHL Humanitarian of the Year award 2003	Succeeded by Chris Campoli
Preceded by Brandin Cote	Winner of the Doug Wickenheiser Memorial Trophy; 2003	Succeeded by Braydon Coburn
Sporting positions
Preceded by Wyatt Smith	Captain of the Wilkes-Barre/Scranton Penguins; 2010–2012	Succeeded by Joey Mormina
Preceded by Manny Viveiros	Head coach of the Henderson Silver Knights; 2023–2026	Succeeded by Joel Ward
Preceded by John Tortorella	Head coach of the Vegas Golden Knights; 2026–present	Incumbent
