= Jim Vandermeer =

Canadian ice hockey player (born 1980)

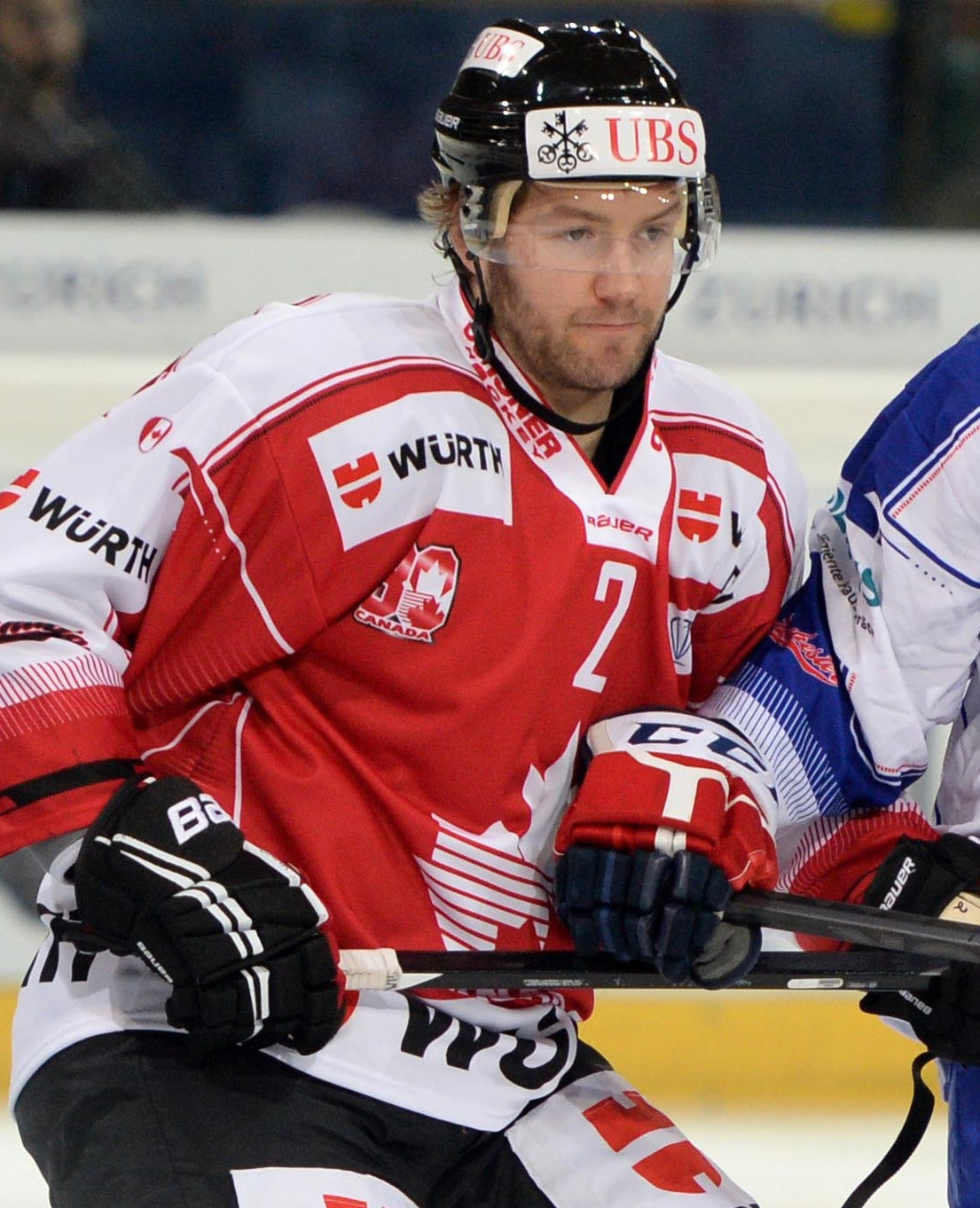
- Vandermeer in 2013
- Born: 21 February 1980 (age 46) Caroline, Alberta, Canada
- Height: 6 ft 1 in (185 cm)
- Weight: 214 lb (97 kg; 15 st 4 lb)
- Position: Defence
- Shot: Left
- Played for: Philadelphia Flyers; Chicago Blackhawks; Calgary Flames; Phoenix Coyotes; Edmonton Oilers; San Jose Sharks; Kloten Flyers; Belfast Giants
- NHL draft: Undrafted
- Playing career: 2001–2019

James Patrick Vandermeer (born 21 February 1980) is a Canadian former professional ice hockey defenceman who last played for the Belfast Giants of the Elite Ice Hockey League (EIHL). Vandermeer previously played for the Philadelphia Flyers, Chicago Blackhawks, Calgary Flames, Phoenix Coyotes, Edmonton Oilers and the San Jose Sharks of the National Hockey League (NHL).

== Playing career ==
=== Amateur ===
Vandermeer capped-off a four-year career (1997–2001) with the Red Deer Rebels of the Western Hockey League (WHL) winning the Memorial Cup in 2001, while leading the WHL that season in plus/minus, with a +49. The recipient of the WHL Humanitarian of the Year award in 2001, Vandermeer served as the team's captain from 1999 to 2001, and amassed over 700 PIM in his four years in Red Deer.

=== Professional ===
On 21 December 2000, Vandermeer signed with the Philadelphia Flyers as an undrafted free agent. He made his professional AHL debut with the Philadelphia Phantoms during the 2001–02 season. On 2 January 2003, Vandermeer made his NHL debut with the Philadelphia Flyers playing against the Mighty Ducks of Anaheim.

On 19 February 2004, Vandermeer was traded to the Chicago Blackhawks with Colin Fraser and a 2004 second round draft pick in exchange for Alexei Zhamnov. During the 2004–05 NHL lockout, Vandermeer played with the Norfolk Admirals, the AHL affiliate to the Chicago Blackhawks. Vandermeer re-signed with the Chicago Blackhawks from 2005 to 2008. He was named one of the team's alternate captains for select games and earned over $3 million during this time.

On 18 December 2007, Vandermeer was traded back to the Philadelphia Flyers in exchange for Ben Eager. On 20 February 2008, Vandermeer was traded by the Flyers to the Calgary Flames for a third round pick in the 2009 NHL entry draft.

On 1 July 2008, Vandermeer signed a three-year deal worth $6.9 million as an unrestricted free agent with the Calgary Flames. On 27 June 2009, Vandermeer was traded by the Flames to the Phoenix Coyotes in exchange for Brandon Prust.

On 7 April 2010, Vandermeer was named Man of the Year by the Phoenix Coyotes. On 30 June 2010, Vandermeer was traded by the Coyotes to the Edmonton Oilers in exchange for Patrick O'Sullivan.

During the 2010–11 season with the Oilers, Vandermeer was named one of the alternate captains for select games. On 22 March 2011, Vandermeer recorded his 100th career point vs the Nashville Predators with an assist on a goal by Jordan Eberle.

On 1 July 2011, Vandermeer became an unrestricted free agent and signed a one-year, $1 million contract with the San Jose Sharks.

On 14 January 2013, after the lockout ended, Vandermeer continued his journeyman career in signing a one-year, two-way contract with the Vancouver Canucks that paid him $600,000 at the NHL level and $275,000 at the AHL level. Vandermeer spent the majority of the shortened season with the Canucks AHL affiliate, the Chicago Wolves, and was named one of the team's alternate captains for select games.

On 6 September 2013, Vandermeer signed a one-year contract in Switzerland with the Kloten Flyers of the NLA. He signed one-year contract extensions with the Kloten Flyers in November 2013, and September 2014.

On 2 February 2016, Vandermeer signed with the Belfast Giants of the Elite Ice Hockey League. Vandermeer re-signed with the Giants in August 2017 for the 2017–18 season, becoming Belfast's player/assistant coach alongside head coach Adam Keefe in the process. Vandermeer remained with Belfast until the end of the 2018–19 season.

== Personal ==
Born and raised in Caroline, Alberta, Vandermeer has a brother, Pete, a pro hockey player himself.

Vandermeer and his wife, Stefanie, were introduced by their mutual friend Brent Seabrook in 2007. They were married on 3 July 2009, in Vancouver. NHL stars Brent Seabrook and James Wisniewski served as groomsmen. They reside in Vancouver during the offseason. They have two children, a son, born in 2013 and a daughter, born in 2014.

== Career statistics ==
			Regular season					Playoffs
Season	Team	League	GP	G	A	Pts	PIM	GP	G	A	Pts	PIM
1997–98	Red Deer Chiefs AAA	AMHL	26	4	8	12	51	—	—	—	—	—
1997–98	Red Deer Rebels	WHL	35	0	3	3	55	2	0	0	0	0
1998–99	Red Deer Rebels	WHL	70	5	23	28	258	9	0	1	1	24
1999–00	Red Deer Rebels	WHL	71	8	30	38	221	4	0	1	1	16
2000–01	Red Deer Rebels	WHL	72	21	44	65	180	22	3	13	16	43
2001–02	Philadelphia Phantoms	AHL	74	1	13	14	88	5	0	2	2	14
2002–03	Philadelphia Phantoms	AHL	48	4	8	12	122	—	—	—	—	—
2002–03	Philadelphia Flyers	NHL	24	2	1	3	27	8	0	1	1	9
2003–04	Philadelphia Phantoms	AHL	26	1	6	7	120	—	—	—	—	—
2003–04	Philadelphia Flyers	NHL	23	3	2	5	25	—	—	—	—	—
2003–04	Chicago Blackhawks	NHL	23	2	10	12	58	—	—	—	—	—
2004–05	Norfolk Admirals	AHL	52	3	10	13	164	—	—	—	—	—
2005–06	Chicago Blackhawks	NHL	76	6	18	24	116	—	—	—	—	—
2006–07	Chicago Blackhawks	NHL	46	1	6	7	53	—	—	—	—	—
2007–08	Chicago Blackhawks	NHL	26	2	7	9	44	—	—	—	—	—
2007–08	Philadelphia Flyers	NHL	28	1	5	6	27	—	—	—	—	—
2007–08	Calgary Flames	NHL	21	0	2	2	39	7	0	0	0	4
2008–09	Calgary Flames	NHL	45	1	6	7	108	6	0	1	1	4
2009–10	Phoenix Coyotes	NHL	62	4	8	12	60	—	—	—	—	—
2010–11	Edmonton Oilers	NHL	62	2	12	14	74	—	—	—	—	—
2011–12	San Jose Sharks	NHL	25	1	3	4	33	—	—	—	—	—
2012–13	Chicago Wolves	AHL	34	5	5	10	66	—	—	—	—	—
2013–14	Kloten Flyers	NLA	49	2	10	12	86	16	1	0	1	26
2014–15	Kloten Flyers	NLA	43	3	7	10	39	—	—	—	—	—
2015–16	Belfast Giants	EIHL	12	2	10	12	31	2	0	1	1	12
2016–17	Belfast Giants	EIHL	50	8	17	25	87	3	0	1	1	0
2017–18	Belfast Giants	EIHL	33	7	16	23	86	2	1	1	2	0
2018–19	Belfast Giants	EIHL	48	4	16	20	31	4	1	3	4	8
NHL totals			436	25	80	105	590	21	0	2	2	17

== Awards and honours ==
Award	Year
WHL Doug Wickenheiser Memorial Trophy	2000–01
WHL West First Team All-Star	2000–01
CHL Humanitarian of the Year Award	2000–01
WHL Plus-Minus Award	2000–01
AHL Philadelphia Phantoms Most Coachable Player Award	2000–01
AHL Philadelphia Phantoms Most Coachable Player Award	2001–02
NHL Phoenix Coyotes Man of the Year Award	2009–10
EIHL Belfast Giants Defenseman of the Year Award	2016–17

Awards and achievements
Preceded by Simon Gamache	Winner of the CHL Humanitarian of the Year Award; 2001	Succeeded by Brandin Cote
Preceded by Chris Nielsen	Winner of the WHL Doug Wickenheiser Memorial Trophy; 2001	Succeeded by Brandin Cote
Preceded by Kenton Smith	Winner of the WHL Plus-Minus Award; 2001	Succeeded by Matt Hubbauer
