= Alexei Zhamnov =

Russian ice hockey player (born 1970)

- Born: October 1, 1970 (age 55) Moscow, Russian SFSR, Soviet Union
- Height: 6 ft 1 in (185 cm)
- Weight: 187 lb (85 kg; 13 st 5 lb)
- Position: Center
- Shot: Left
- Played for: Dynamo Moscow; Winnipeg Jets; Chicago Blackhawks; Philadelphia Flyers; Boston Bruins
- Current KHL coach: Spartak Moscow
- National team: Soviet Union, Unified Team and Russia
- NHL draft: 77th overall, 1990; Winnipeg Jets
- Playing career: 1992–2006
- Coaching career: 2013–present

Alexei Yuryevich "Alex" Zhamnov (Russian: Алексей Юрьевич Жамнов; born October 1, 1970) is a former professional ice hockey centre who played in the National Hockey League (NHL) for the Winnipeg Jets, Chicago Blackhawks, Philadelphia Flyers and Boston Bruins. He is currently serving the head coach of HC Spartak Moscow of the Kontinental Hockey League (KHL). He previously served as general manager of Vityaz Chekhov and Atlant Moscow Oblast and was the head coach of the Russia men's national ice hockey team.

== Playing career ==
Alexei Zhamnov was drafted by the Winnipeg Jets in the 4th round, 77th overall, in the 1990 NHL entry draft. After the 1992 Olympics, he began his career with the Jets in the 1992–93 season.

Zhamnov centered the Jets "Olympic line" with teammates Keith Tkachuk and Teemu Selanne, with all three being Olympians for their respective countries.

Zhamnov's tenure with the Jets was very successful, having managed over a point per game in each of his four seasons there. His best season was in the lockout-shortened 1994-95 season, where he led the Jets in scoring and finished third in the entire league. Of particular note was when he scored 5 goals against the Los Angeles Kings on April 1, 1995. The game would ultimately end in a 7–7 tie.

After the Jets moved to Phoenix, Zhamnov was traded by the Phoenix Coyotes (having never suited up for them) to the Chicago Blackhawks in exchange for Jeremy Roenick in the summer of 1996. While he no longer maintained his point per game scoring pace with the Blackhawks, he ironically had offensive success with Roenick's childhood friend Tony Amonte. During his tenure with the Blackhawks he would serve as team captain from 2002 to 2004.

On 20 February 2004, Zhamnov was then traded by Chicago to the Philadelphia Flyers in exchange for Jim Vandermeer, Colin Fraser, and a second-round selection in the 2004 NHL entry draft.

On 4 August 2005, Zhamnov signed a three-year deal with the Boston Bruins as a free agent. However having played just 24 games into his first season with the Bruins into the 2005–06 season, Zhamnov was often injured and placed on the long-term injury list by the Boston Bruins on January 7, 2006 after suffering a career ending broken ankle in what would be his final professional game in a 6-3 victory over the Tampa Bay Lightning. Zhamnov subsequently retired in 2006.

== International play ==
Medal record

Ice hockey

Representing Unified Team

Olympic Games
| Gold medal – first place | 1992 Albertville | |

Representing Russia

Olympic Games
| Silver medal – second place | 1998 Nagano | |
| Bronze medal – third place | 2002 Salt Lake City | |

Representing Soviet Union

World Championships
| Bronze medal – third place | 1991 Finland | |

World Junior Championship
| Silver medal – second place | 1990 Finland | |

Zhamnov was a part of three Olympic Games, winning gold, silver, and bronze medals with the Unified Team and Russian teams. He was selected to play in 2006, but did not participate due to injury. During the 2004–05 NHL lockout, Zhamnov spent time playing in his homeland.

== Career statistics ==
=== Regular season and playoffs ===
| | | | Regular season | | | | | Playoffs |
| Season | Team | League | GP | G | A | Pts | PIM | GP | G | A | Pts | PIM |
|---|---|---|---|---|---|---|---|---|---|---|---|---|
| 1988–89 | Dynamo Moscow | USSR | 4 | 0 | 0 | 0 | 0 | — | — | — | — | — |
| 1988–89 | MCOP Moscow | USSR III | 8 | 4 | 1 | 5 | 6 | — | — | — | — | — |
| 1989–90 | Dynamo Moscow | USSR | 43 | 11 | 6 | 17 | 21 | — | — | — | — | — |
| 1990–91 | Dynamo Moscow | USSR | 46 | 14 | 12 | 28 | 24 | — | — | — | — | — |
| 1991–92 | Dynamo Moscow | CIS | 32 | 12 | 16 | 28 | 20 | 7 | 3 | 5 | 8 | 8 |
| 1992–93 | Winnipeg Jets | NHL | 68 | 25 | 47 | 72 | 58 | 6 | 0 | 2 | 2 | 2 |
| 1993–94 | Winnipeg Jets | NHL | 61 | 26 | 45 | 71 | 62 | — | — | — | — | — |
| 1994–95 | Winnipeg Jets | NHL | 48 | 30 | 35 | 65 | 20 | — | — | — | — | — |
| 1995–96 | Winnipeg Jets | NHL | 58 | 22 | 37 | 59 | 65 | 6 | 2 | 1 | 3 | 8 |
| 1996–97 | Chicago Blackhawks | NHL | 74 | 20 | 42 | 62 | 56 | — | — | — | — | — |
| 1997–98 | Chicago Blackhawks | NHL | 70 | 21 | 28 | 49 | 61 | — | — | — | — | — |
| 1998–99 | Chicago Blackhawks | NHL | 76 | 20 | 41 | 61 | 50 | — | — | — | — | — |
| 1999–00 | Chicago Blackhawks | NHL | 71 | 23 | 37 | 60 | 61 | — | — | — | — | — |
| 2000–01 | Chicago Blackhawks | NHL | 63 | 13 | 36 | 49 | 40 | — | — | — | — | — |
| 2001–02 | Chicago Blackhawks | NHL | 77 | 22 | 45 | 67 | 67 | 5 | 0 | 0 | 0 | 0 |
| 2002–03 | Chicago Blackhawks | NHL | 74 | 15 | 43 | 58 | 70 | — | — | — | — | — |
| 2003–04 | Chicago Blackhawks | NHL | 23 | 6 | 12 | 18 | 14 | — | — | — | — | — |
| 2003–04 | Philadelphia Flyers | NHL | 20 | 5 | 13 | 18 | 14 | 18 | 4 | 10 | 14 | 8 |
| 2004–05 | Vityaz Chekhov | RUS II | 24 | 5 | 22 | 27 | 20 | 14 | 7 | 7 | 14 | 10 |
| 2005–06 | Boston Bruins | NHL | 24 | 1 | 9 | 10 | 30 | — | — | — | — | — |
| USSR/CIS totals | | | 125 | 39 | 34 | 73 | 65 | 7 | 3 | 5 | 8 | 8 |
| NHL totals | | | 807 | 249 | 470 | 719 | 668 | 35 | 6 | 13 | 19 | 18 |

=== International ===
| Year | Team | Event | Result | GP | G | A | Pts | PIM |
|---|---|---|---|---|---|---|---|---|
| 1990 | Soviet Union | WJC | 2nd place, silver medalist(s) | 7 | 6 | 1 | 7 | 6 |
| 1991 | Soviet Union | WC | 3rd place, bronze medalist(s) | 10 | 4 | 5 | 9 | 12 |
| 1991 | Soviet Union | CC | 5th | 5 | 3 | 0 | 3 | 2 |
| 1992 | Unified Team | OLY | 1st place, gold medalist(s) | 8 | 0 | 3 | 3 | 8 |
| 1992 | Russia | WC | 5th | 6 | 0 | 0 | 0 | 29 |
| 1996 | Russia | WCH | SF | 4 | 0 | 2 | 2 | 6 |
| 1998 | Russia | OLY | 2nd place, silver medalist(s) | 6 | 2 | 1 | 3 | 2 |
| 2000 | Russia | WC | 11th | 5 | 0 | 1 | 1 | 0 |
| 2002 | Russia | OLY | 3rd place, bronze medalist(s) | 6 | 1 | 0 | 1 | 4 |
| Senior totals | | | | 50 | 10 | 12 | 22 | 63 |

== Awards and honors ==
| Award | Year |
NHL
| Second All-Star team | 1994–95 |
| All-Star Game | 2001–02 |

Sporting positions
| Preceded by Tony Amonte | Chicago Blackhawks captain 2002–04 | Succeeded by Adrian Aucoin |
