= Brandin Cote =

Canadian ice hockey player (born 1981)

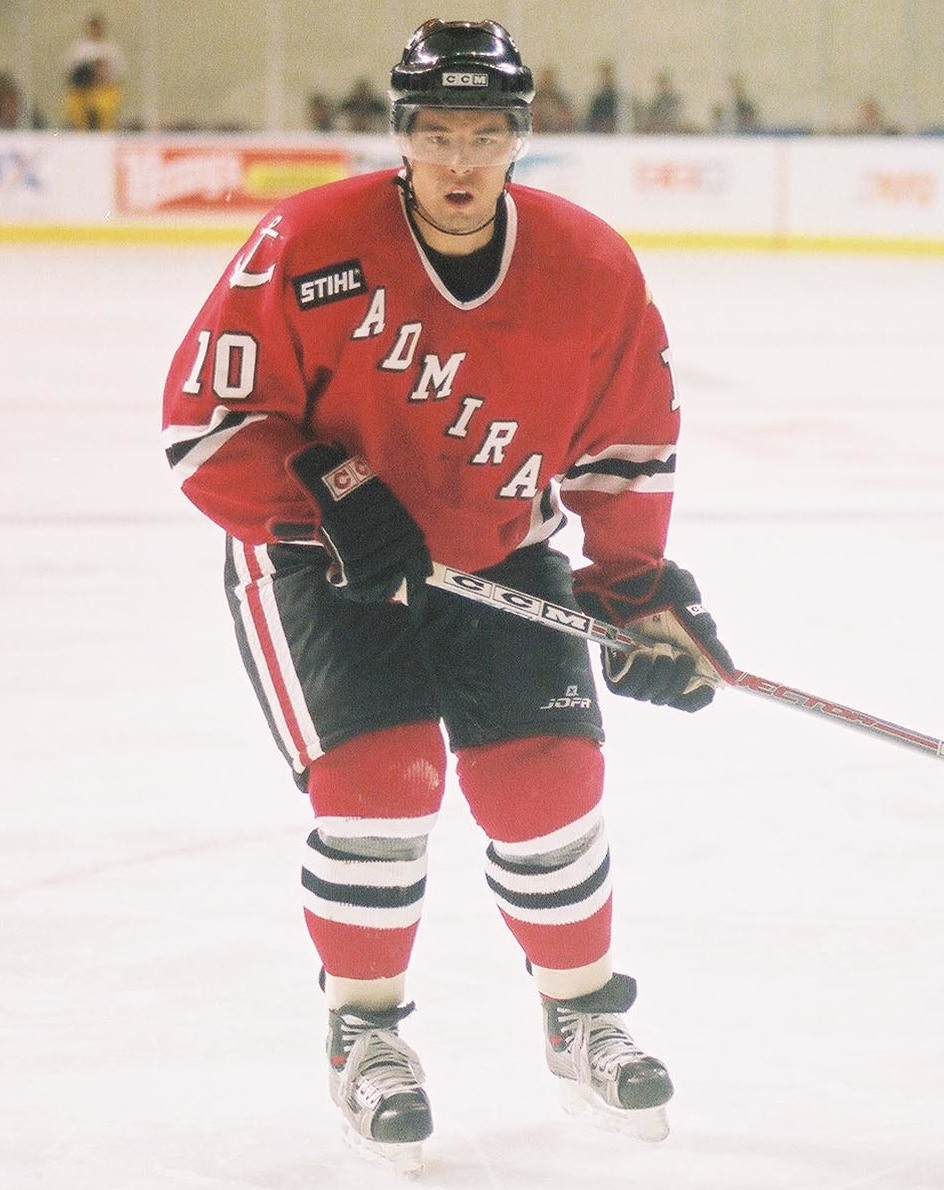
- Cote with the Norfolk Admirals in 2005
- Born: April 21, 1981 (age 45) Swift Current, Saskatchewan, Canada
- Height: 5 ft 10 in (178 cm)
- Weight: 200 lb (91 kg; 14 st 4 lb)
- Position: Centre
- Shot: Left
- Played for: Norfolk Admirals; Nottingham Panthers; Texas Wildcatters; SG Cortina; Fischtown Pinguins
- Playing career: 2002–2009

Brandin Cote (born April 21, 1981) is a Canadian retired professional ice hockey centre who last played for the Fischtown Pinguins in the German 2nd Bundesliga in 2008–09. In 2002, Cote signed with the Chicago Blackhawks as a free agent. He played three seasons for Norfolk then moved to England to play for the Nottingham Panthers. He returned for one more season with Norfolk, then played for the Texas Wildcatters. He returned to Europe for two seasons before retiring in 2009.

Cote was born in Swift Current, Saskatchewan. He played junior for the Spokane Chiefs of the Western Hockey League.

Following his pro career, Cote played one season of senior hockey with the Bentley Generals of the Chinook Hockey League. In September 2012, he was named as the head coach of the Generals and led them to an Allan Cup championship in his first season behind the bench.

== Awards ==
- 2001 - WHL West Second Team All-Star
- 2002 - CHL Humanitarian of the Year Award
- 2002 - WHL Doug Wickenheiser Memorial Trophy

== Career statistics ==
			Regular Season					Playoffs
Season	Team	League	GP	G	A	Pts	PIM	GP	G	A	Pts	PIM
1996–97	Spokane Chiefs	WHL	7	0	0	0	0	--	--	--	--	--
1997–98	Spokane Chiefs	WHL	66	12	12	24	84	18	6	3	9	10
1998–99	Spokane Chiefs	WHL	68	15	27	42	114	--	--	--	--	--
1999–2000	Spokane Chiefs	WHL	71	19	32	51	66	15	0	6	6	14
2000–01	Spokane Chiefs	WHL	69	27	43	70	117	8	1	1	2	12
2001–02	Spokane Chiefs	WHL	71	28	40	68	114	11	4	6	10	16
2002–03	Norfolk Admirals	AHL	65	2	12	14	46	1	0	0	0	0
2003–04	Norfolk Admirals	AHL	54	9	3	12	46	8	1	0	1	10
2004–05	Norfolk Admirals	AHL	70	3	10	13	91	6	0	1	1	2
2005–06	Nottingham Panthers	EIHL	36	12	16	28	70	--	--	--	--	--
2006–07	Texas Wildcatters	ECHL	65	28	31	59	101	10	2	10	12	16
2006–07	Norfolk Admirals	AHL	5	0	0	0	8	--	--	--	--	--
2007-08	SG Cortina	Italy	32	7	14	21	22	--	--	--	--	--
2008–09	Fischtown Pinguins	2.GBun	24	3	9	12	52	6	0	4	4	4
6 seasons	Totals	WHL	352	101	154	255	495	52	11	16	27	52
1 season	Totals	EIHL	36	12	16	28	70	--	--	--	--	--
1 season	Totals	ECHL	65	28	31	59	101	10	2	10	12	16
4 seasons	Totals	AHL	194	14	25	39	191	15	1	1	2	12
1 season	Totals	Italy	32	7	14	21	22	--	--	--	--	--
1 season	Totals	2.GBun	24	3	9	12	52	6	0	4	4	4

Preceded by Jim Vandermeer	Winner of the CHL Humanitarian of the Year Award; 2002	Succeeded by Ryan Craig
Preceded by Jim Vandermeer	Winner of the WHL Doug Wickenheiser Memorial Trophy; 2002	Succeeded by Ryan Craig
