= Braydon Coburn =

Canadian ice hockey player (born 1985)

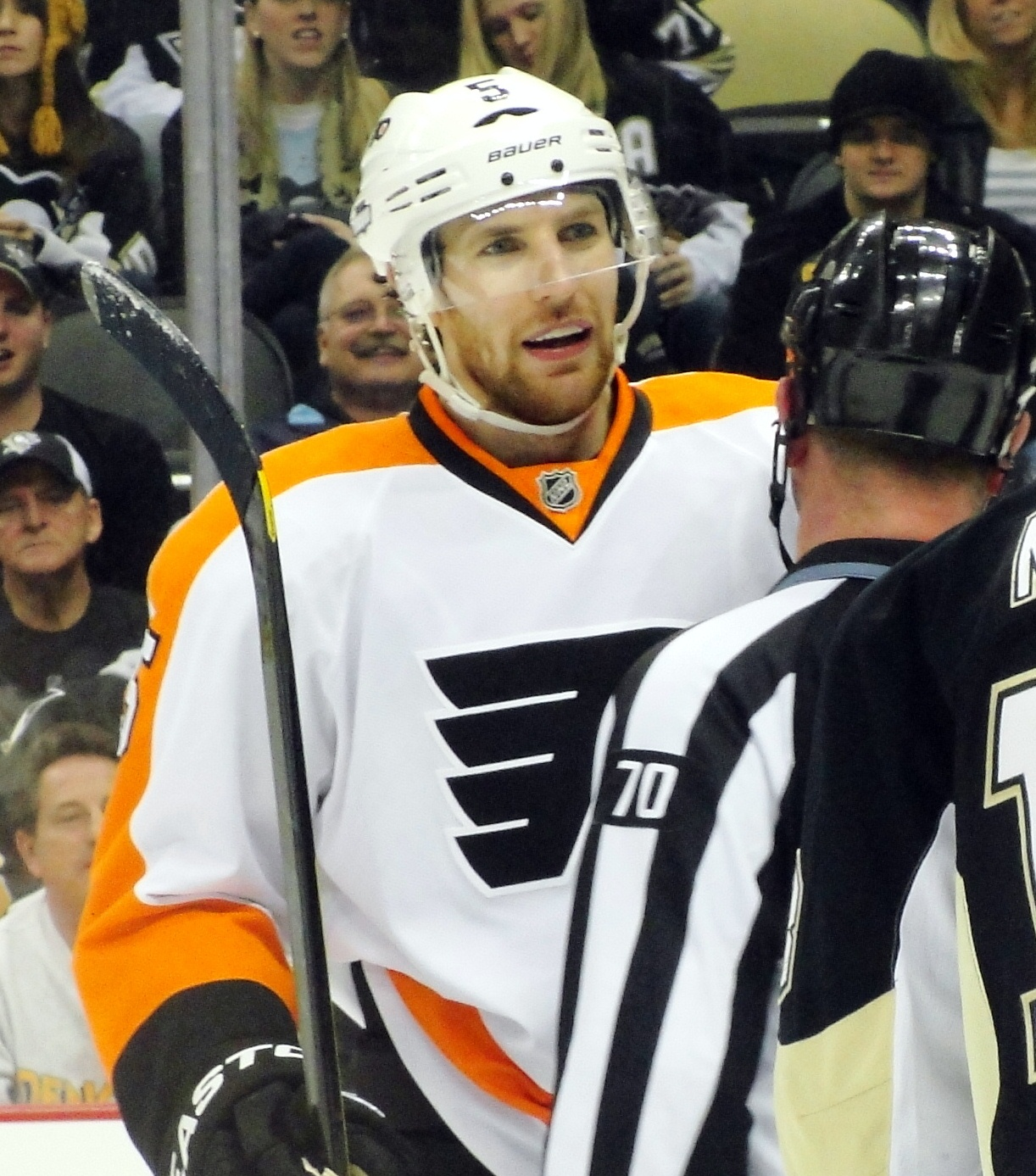
- Coburn with the Philadelphia Flyers in December 2011
- Born: February 27, 1985 (age 41) Calgary, Alberta, Canada
- Height: 6 ft 5 in (196 cm)
- Weight: 224 lb (102 kg; 16 st 0 lb)
- Position: Defence
- Shot: Left
- Played for: Atlanta Thrashers; Philadelphia Flyers; Tampa Bay Lightning; Ottawa Senators; New York Islanders
- National team: Canada
- NHL draft: 8th overall, 2003; Atlanta Thrashers
- Playing career: 2005–2021

Braydon Coburn (born February 27, 1985) is a Canadian former professional ice hockey defenceman. Coburn was originally selected in the first round, eighth overall, by the Atlanta Thrashers in the 2003 NHL entry draft, beginning his NHL career with the organization before moving to the Philadelphia Flyers, Tampa Bay Lightning, Ottawa Senators and New York Islanders. Coburn won the Stanley Cup as a member of the Lightning in 2020.

== Playing career ==
Coburn was born in Calgary, Alberta, but grew up in Shaunavon, Saskatchewan, where he played most of his minor hockey. After his Bantam season in 1999–2000, Coburn was selected first overall in the Western Hockey League (WHL) Bantam Draft by the Portland Winter Hawks. The following season, Coburn played Midget AAA hockey for the Notre Dame Hounds of the Saskatchewan Midget Hockey League.

Coburn played major junior hockey with the WHL's Winter Hawks. He was awarded the Jim Piggott Memorial Trophy as rookie of the year for the 2001–02 season, and although his points total dipped from 37 points to 19 the following year, he remained a top NHL prospect, subsequently being selected eighth overall in the 2003 NHL entry draft by the Atlanta Thrashers.

After his draft, Coburn returned to the WHL for two more seasons and was eventually awarded with the Doug Wickenheiser Memorial Trophy after the 2003–04 season as Humanitarian of the Year. On February 4, 2005, Coburn tied a WHL record for most goals by a defenceman in a game with four against the Seattle Thunderbirds in a 7–4 win. He completed his final year with the Winter Hawks in 2004–05 with a junior career-high 44 points.

During Coburn's time in the WHL, he also competed in two World Junior Championships for Canada, winning silver in 2004 and gold in 2005. He later played an unfortunate role in the outcome of the 2004 tournament — with the gold medal game between Canada and the United States tied at 3–3 with less than five minutes left to play in regulation, Canadian goaltender Marc-André Fleury tried to clear the puck to avert a breakaway by the USA's Patrick O'Sullivan. However, Fleury's clearing attempt went off Coburn and into his own net, giving the Americans a 4–3 advantage that eventually won them both the game and the gold medal.

=== Professional ===
After several years in the Thrashers organization, during which Coburn split his time between the NHL and the Thrashers' minor league affiliate, the Chicago Wolves of the American Hockey League (AHL), Coburn was traded on February 24, 2007 (the NHL trade deadline) to the Philadelphia Flyers in exchange for defenceman Alexei Zhitnik. The trade is often considered one of the more lopsided trades in recent NHL history, as Coburn went on to become one of the Flyers' top defenders while Zhitnik failed to meet expectations and was bought out one year later. The following season, in 2007–08, Coburn emerged with an 8-goal, 36-point season with Philadelphia. In the midst of the Flyers' 2008 Stanley Cup playoff run, Coburn was injured on May 11, 2008, two minutes into Game 2 of the Eastern Conference Final against the Pittsburgh Penguins when a deflected puck hit him above the eye. The resulting gash required 50 stitches to be closed, and Coburn did not return for the rest of the series.

On July 1, 2010, Coburn signed a two-year contract extension with the Flyers. Philadelphia later extended Coburn on November 9, 2011, at a rate of $18 million over four years, a $4.5 million annual cap hit.

Approaching the 2014–15 trade deadline, with the Flyers on the outside of a 2015 playoff position, Coburn was traded to the Tampa Bay Lightning in exchange for defenceman Radko Gudas and a first- and third-round selection in 2015 NHL entry draft on March 2, 2015.

On February 26, 2016, Tampa Bay signed Coburn to a three-year, $11.1 million contract extension. On October 15, 2016, Coburn skated in his 700th career NHL game, a 3–2 Lightning win over the visiting New Jersey Devils. On June 18, 2019, Tampa Bay extended Coburn’s contract for an additional 2 years at $3.4 million. Despite a reduced role, appearing in 40 regular season games for 4 points and 3 playoff games, he was a member of the 2019–20 team who won the Stanley Cup.

With a year remaining on his contract, approaching the delayed 2020–21 season and with the Lightning under salary cap constraints, Coburn was traded after six seasons in Tampa Bay along with Cédric Paquette and a 2022 second-round pick to the Ottawa Senators in exchange for Anders Nilsson and the contract of Marián Gáborík on December 27, 2020.

Coburn was traded from the Senators to the New York Islanders on April 11, 2021, for a seventh-round pick in the 2022 NHL Entry Draft. On November 12, 2021, Coburn announced his retirement from the NHL.

== Personal life ==
Coburn married fiancée Nadine in the summer of 2010, and the couple had their first child in October 2011.

== Career statistics ==
=== Regular season and playoffs ===
			Regular season					Playoffs
Season	Team	League	GP	G	A	Pts	PIM	GP	G	A	Pts	PIM
2000–01	Portland Winter Hawks	WHL	2	0	1	1	0	14	0	4	4	2
2001–02	Portland Winter Hawks	WHL	68	4	33	37	100	7	1	1	2	9
2002–03	Portland Winter Hawks	WHL	53	3	16	19	147	7	0	1	1	8
2003–04	Portland Winter Hawks	WHL	55	10	20	30	92	5	0	1	1	10
2004–05	Portland Winter Hawks	WHL	60	12	32	44	144	7	1	5	6	6
2004–05	Chicago Wolves	AHL	3	0	1	1	5	18	0	1	1	36
2005–06	Chicago Wolves	AHL	73	6	20	26	136	—	—	—	—	—
2005–06	Atlanta Thrashers	NHL	9	0	1	1	4	—	—	—	—	—
2006–07	Chicago Wolves	AHL	15	1	10	11	36	—	—	—	—	—
2006–07	Atlanta Thrashers	NHL	29	0	4	4	30	—	—	—	—	—
2006–07	Philadelphia Flyers	NHL	20	3	4	7	16	—	—	—	—	—
2007–08	Philadelphia Flyers	NHL	78	9	27	36	74	14	0	6	6	14
2008–09	Philadelphia Flyers	NHL	80	7	21	28	97	6	0	3	3	7
2009–10	Philadelphia Flyers	NHL	81	5	14	19	54	23	1	3	4	22
2010–11	Philadelphia Flyers	NHL	82	2	14	16	53	11	1	2	3	6
2011–12	Philadelphia Flyers	NHL	81	4	20	24	56	11	0	4	4	8
2012–13	Philadelphia Flyers	NHL	33	1	4	5	41	—	—	—	—	—
2013–14	Philadelphia Flyers	NHL	82	5	12	17	63	7	0	3	3	4
2014–15	Philadelphia Flyers	NHL	39	1	8	9	16	—	—	—	—	—
2014–15	Tampa Bay Lightning	NHL	4	0	2	2	9	26	1	3	4	21
2015–16	Tampa Bay Lightning	NHL	80	1	9	10	53	17	0	2	2	12
2016–17	Tampa Bay Lightning	NHL	80	5	7	12	50	—	—	—	—	—
2017–18	Tampa Bay Lightning	NHL	72	1	14	15	40	17	0	2	2	19
2018–19	Tampa Bay Lightning	NHL	74	4	19	23	34	2	0	1	1	0
2019–20	Tampa Bay Lightning	NHL	40	1	3	4	16	3	0	0	0	0
2020–21	Ottawa Senators	NHL	16	0	2	2	10	—	—	—	—	—
2020–21	New York Islanders	NHL	3	0	0	0	4	—	—	—	—	—
NHL totals			983	49	185	234	720	137	3	29	32	113

=== International ===
Medal record

Representing Canada

World Championships
Silver medal – second place	2009 Bern	

World Junior Championships
Gold medal – first place	2005 Grand Forks	
Silver medal – second place	2004 Helsinki	

World U18 Championships
Gold medal – first place	2003 Yaroslavl	

Year	Team	Event	Result	GP	G	A	Pts	PIM
2001	Canada Western	U17	5th	6	0	0	0	2
2002	Canada Western	U17	5th	5	0	7	7	0
2003	Canada	WJC18	1st place, gold medalist(s)	7	0	0	0	12
2004	Canada	WJC	2nd place, silver medalist(s)	6	2	1	3	2
2005	Canada	WJC	1st place, gold medalist(s)	6	0	2	2	8
2009	Canada	WC	2nd place, silver medalist(s)	5	0	1	1	4
2014	Canada	WC	5th	8	0	0	0	8
Junior totals				30	2	10	12	24
Senior totals				13	0	1	1	12

== Awards and honours ==
Award	Year
WHL
Jim Piggott Memorial Trophy	2002
Doug Wickenheiser Memorial Trophy	2004
West First All-Star Team	2004, 2005
NHL
Stanley Cup champion (Tampa Bay Lightning)	2020

== Records ==
- WHL record for most goals in one game by a defenceman – 4 (on February 4, 2005, against the Seattle Thunderbirds; tied with five other players)

Awards and achievements
Preceded by Scottie Upshall	Winner of the Jim Piggott Memorial Trophy; 2002	Succeeded by Matt Ellison
Preceded by Jim Slater	Atlanta Thrashers first-round draft pick 2003	Succeeded by Boris Valábik
Preceded by Ryan Craig	Winner of the Doug Wickenheiser Memorial Trophy; 2004	Succeeded by Colin Fraser
