= List of Vegas Golden Knights head coaches =

Bruce Cassidy led the Golden Knights to a Stanley Cup championship in his first season as head coach.

The Vegas Golden Knights are an American professional ice hockey team based in the Las Vegas metropolitan area. They play in the Pacific Division of the Western Conference in the National Hockey League (NHL). They have played at T-Mobile Arena since their inaugural season in 2017–18. The Golden Knights joined the NHL as an expansion team in 2017. The team's first head coach, Gerard Gallant, was hired on April 13, 2017. Gallant was fired on January 15, 2020, and replaced by recently fired San Jose Sharks head coach Peter DeBoer. DeBoer served as head coach until his firing on May 16, 2022. Former Boston Bruins head coach Bruce Cassidy was named the team’s third head coach on June 14, 2022. Cassidy was subsequently fired on March 29, 2026, with John Tortorella named the team's fourth head coach. On June 16, 2026, following the conclusion of the 2026 Stanley Cup Final, the team announced that Tortorella would not return as head coach. One day later, former assistant coach and Henderson Silver Knights head coach Ryan Craig was named the fifth head coach in franchise history.

== Key ==
#	Number of coaches (Note: A running total of the number of coaches of the Vegas Golden Knights. Thus, any coach who has two or more separate terms as head coach is only counted once.)
GC	Games coached
W	Wins = 2 points
L	Losses = 0 points
OT	Overtime/shootout losses = 1 point
Pts	Points
Win %	Winning percentage
*	Spent entire NHL head coaching career with the Golden Knights

== Coaches ==
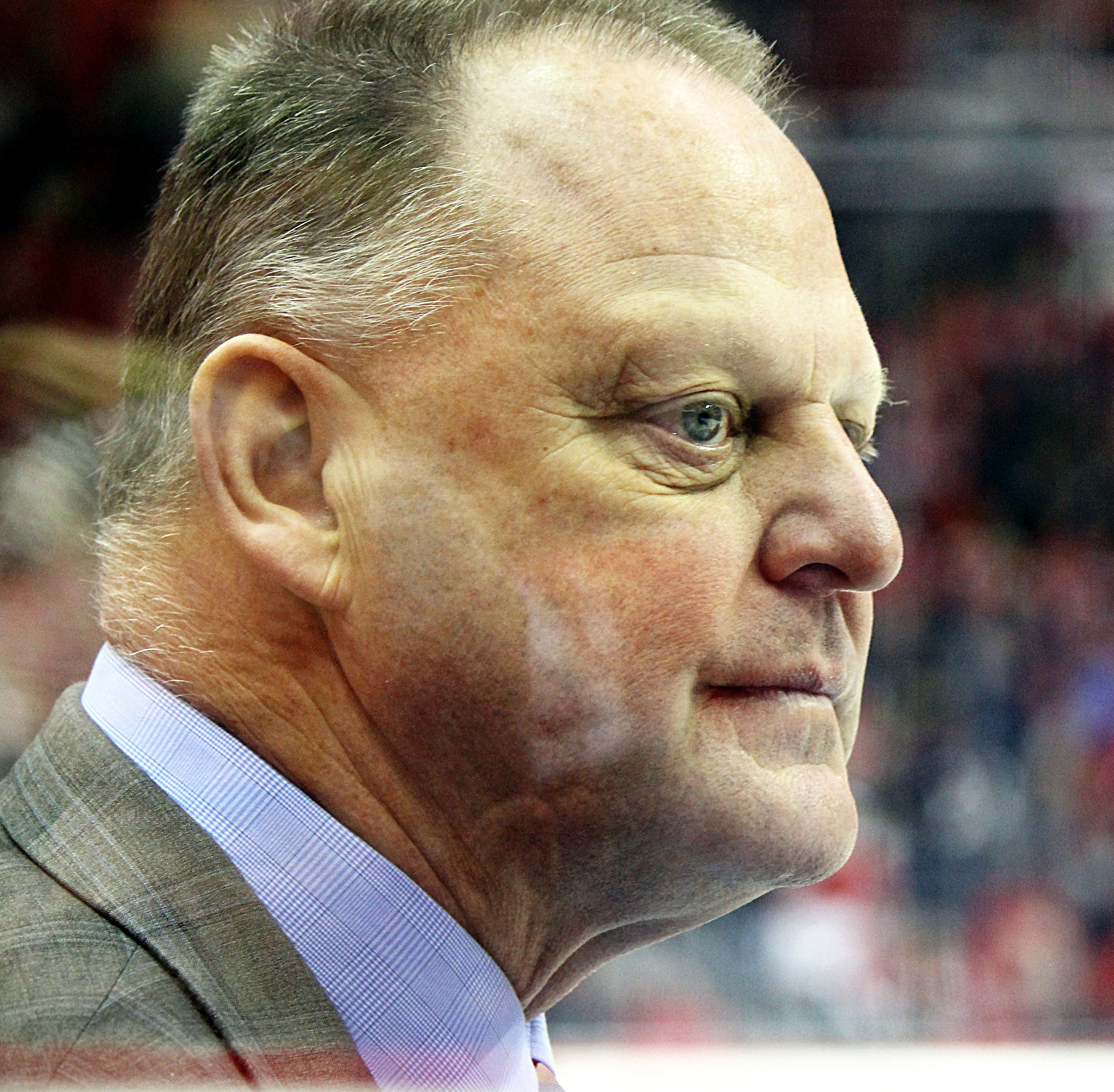
Gerard Gallant, the first head coach in franchise history, served in the role until 2020.

Note: Statistics are updated through the 2025–26 season.

#	Name	Term (Note: Each year is linked to an article about that particular NHL season.)	Regular season						Playoffs				Achievements	Reference
#	Name	Term	GC	W	L	OT	Pts	Win %	GC	W	L	Win %	Achievements	Reference
1	Gerard Gallant	2017–2020	213	118	75	20	256	.601	27	16	11	.593	Jack Adams Award (2017–18)	
2	Peter DeBoer	2020–2022	160	98	50	12	208	.650	39	22	17	.564		
3	Bruce Cassidy	2022–2026	320	178	99	43	399	.623	40	24	16	.600	Stanley Cup championship (2022–23)	
4	John Tortorella	2026	8	7	0	1	15	.938	22	14	8	.636		
5	Ryan Craig*	2026–present						–				–		
