= Doug Wickenheiser Memorial Trophy =

The Doug Wickenheiser Memorial Trophy is an annual award given to the Western Hockey League humanitarian of the year. The winner is the player who best shows a commitment to his community and to humanitarian values. The award received its current name in May 2001 when it was renamed in honour of Doug Wickenheiser, who died of cancer in 1999.

== Winners ==
Season	Player	Team
1992–93	Jamie Pushor	Lethbridge Hurricanes
1993–94	Jason Widmer	Lethbridge Hurricanes
1994–95	Grady Manson	Moose Jaw Warriors
1995–96	Darryl Laplante	Moose Jaw Warriors
1996–97	Jesse Wallin	Red Deer Rebels
1997–98	Jesse Wallin	Red Deer Rebels
1998–99	Andrew Ference	Portland Winter Hawks
1999–2000	Chris Nielsen	Calgary Hitmen
2000–01	Jim Vandermeer	Red Deer Rebels
2001–02	Brandin Cote	Spokane Chiefs
2002–03	Ryan Craig	Brandon Wheat Kings
2003–04	Braydon Coburn	Portland Winter Hawks
2004–05	Colin Fraser	Red Deer Rebels
2005–06	Wacey Rabbit	Saskatoon Blades
2006–07	Kyle Moir	Swift Current Broncos
2007–08	Ashton Hewson	Prince Albert Raiders
2008–09	Taylor Procyshen	Tri-City Americans
2009–10	Matt Fraser	Kootenay Ice
2010–11	Spencer Edwards	Moose Jaw Warriors
2011–12	Taylor Vause	Swift Current Broncos
2012–13	Cody Sylvester	Calgary Hitmen
2013–14	Sam Fioretti	Moose Jaw Warriors
2014–15	Taylor Vickerman	Tri-City Americans
2015–16	Tyler Wong	Lethbridge Hurricanes
2016–17	Tyler Wong	Lethbridge Hurricanes
2017–18	Ty Ronning	Vancouver Giants
2018–19	Will Warm	Edmonton Oil Kings
2019–20	Riley Fiddler-Schultz	Calgary Hitmen
2020–21	not awarded	
2021–22	Luke Prokop	Edmonton Oil Kings
2022–23	Logan Stankoven	Kamloops Blazers
2023–24	Ty Hurley	Kelowna Rockets
2024–25	Kyle McDonough	Portland Winterhawks
2025–26	Shane Smith	Kelowna Rockets

- Blue background denotes also named CHL Humanitarian of the Year

== See also ==
- CHL Humanitarian of the Year – First awarded in 1992–93
- Dan Snyder Memorial Trophy – Ontario Hockey League Humanitarian of the Year
- QMJHL Humanitarian of the Year
