= Andrew Ladd =

Canadian ice hockey player (born 1985)

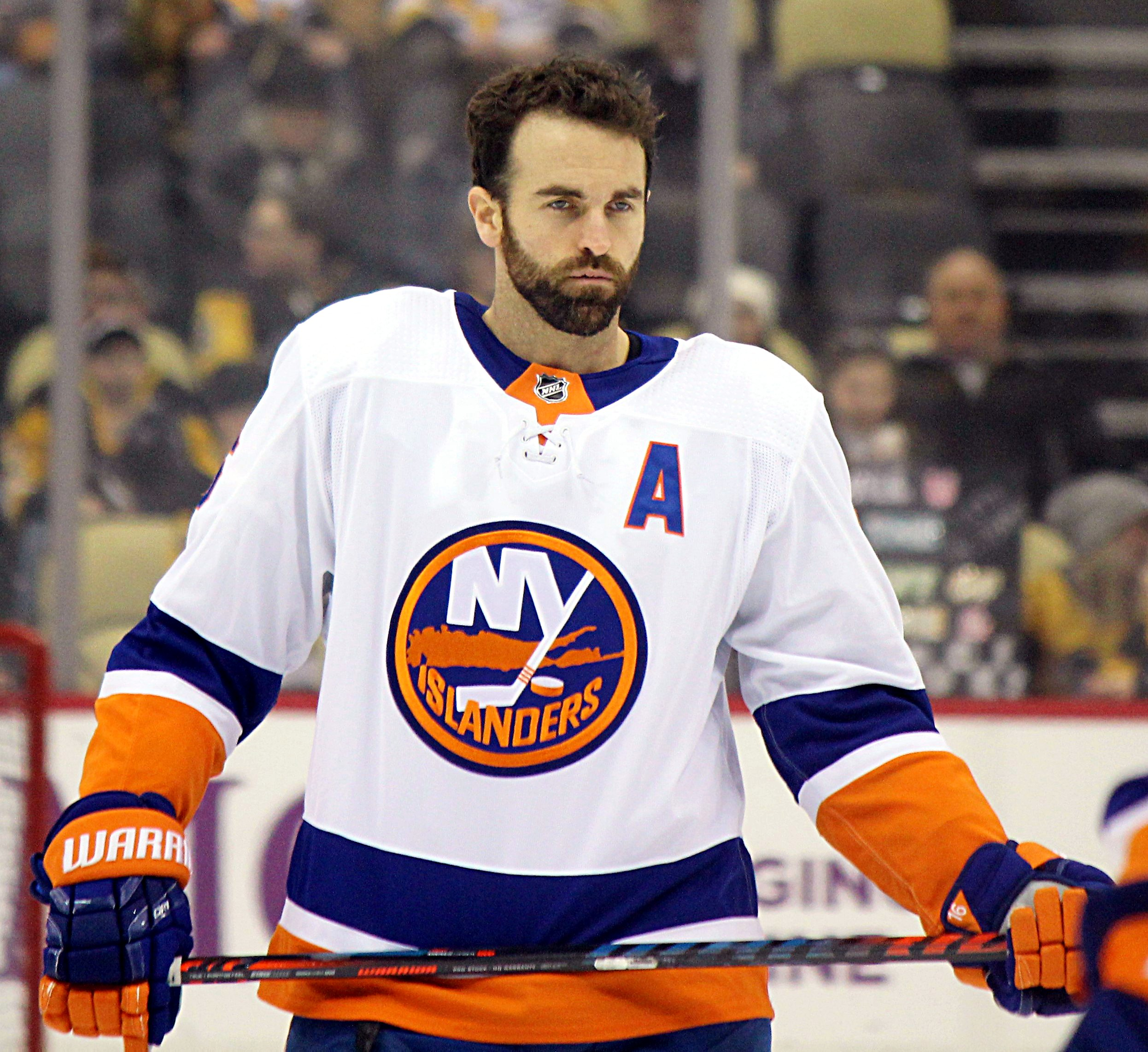
- Ladd with the New York Islanders in March 2018
- Born: December 12, 1985 (age 40) Maple Ridge, British Columbia, Canada
- Height: 6 ft 3 in (191 cm)
- Weight: 205 lb (93 kg; 14 st 9 lb)
- Position: Left wing
- Shot: Left
- Played for: Carolina Hurricanes; Chicago Blackhawks; Atlanta Thrashers; Winnipeg Jets; New York Islanders; Arizona Coyotes
- National team: Canada
- NHL draft: 4th overall, 2004; Carolina Hurricanes
- Playing career: 2005–2022

Andrew Joseph Ladd (born December 12, 1985) is a Canadian former professional ice hockey winger who played for the Carolina Hurricanes, Chicago Blackhawks, Atlanta Thrashers, Winnipeg Jets, New York Islanders and Arizona Coyotes of the National Hockey League (NHL).

Ladd was drafted in 2004 by the Hurricanes and won the Stanley Cup with them in 2006. He won the Stanley Cup for a second time in 2010 with the Blackhawks.

== Playing career ==
=== Junior ===
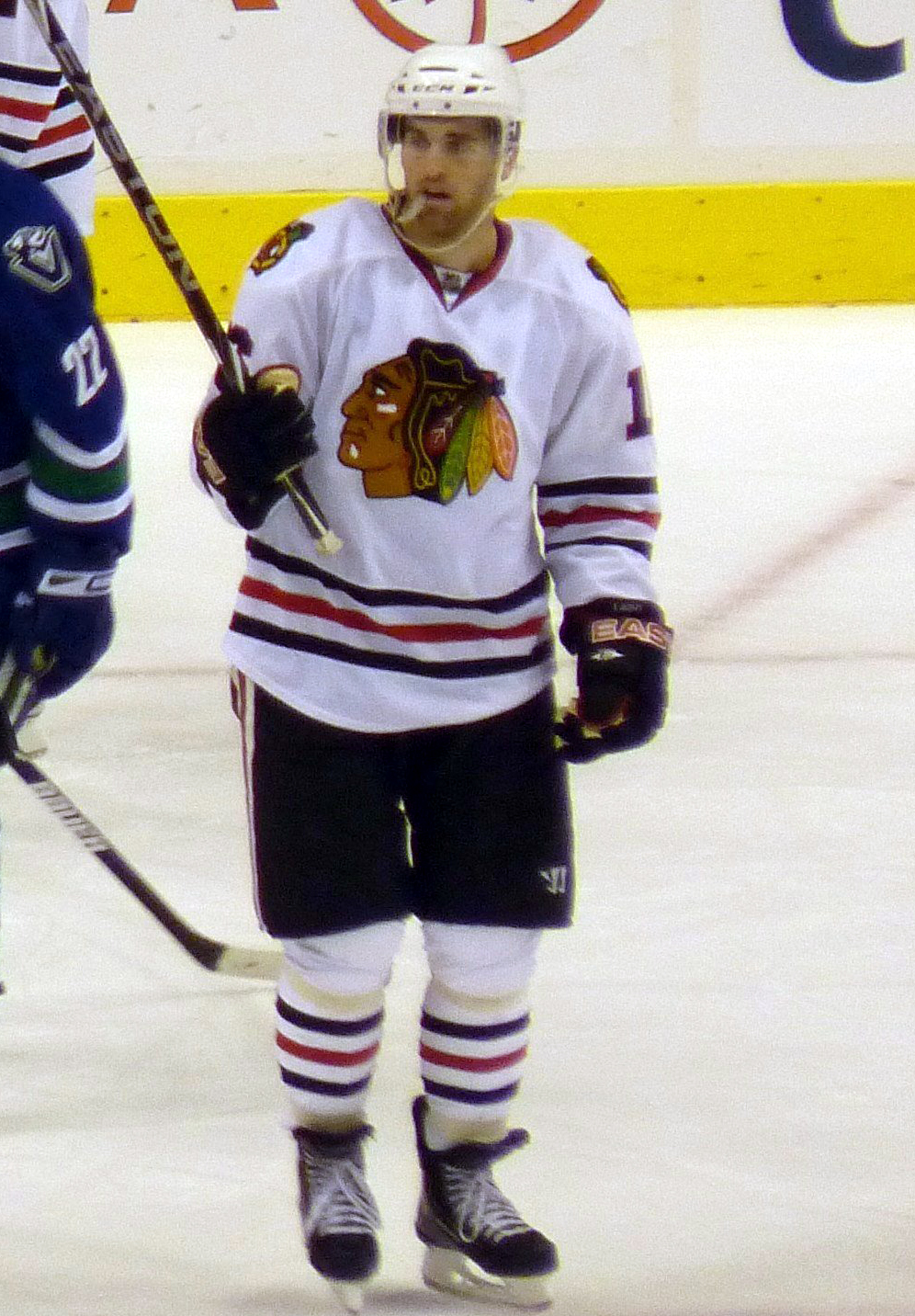
Ladd during his first stint with the Chicago Blackhawks in November 2009

Ladd began his junior hockey career with the Coquitlam Express. He then progressed to the major junior Western Hockey League (WHL) with the Calgary Hitmen after being traded from the Vancouver Giants in exchange for Jamison Orr. He recorded 75 points in his rookie season, tops among first-year players and 15th in WHL scoring. His +39 plus/minus led the league, earning him the WHL Plus-Minus Award. In the off-season, Ladd was drafted in the first round, fourth overall, by the Carolina Hurricanes in the 2004 NHL entry draft.

=== Professional ===
==== Carolina Hurricanes ====
Ladd turned professional after two seasons with the Hitmen in 2005–06 with the Lowell Lock Monsters, the Hurricanes' American Hockey League (AHL) affiliate. He was called up to the Hurricanes in November, making his NHL debut, but soon suffered a knee injury in December which sidelined him until February. Ladd was assigned back to the Lowell Lock Monsters until March when he was recalled to join the Hurricanes for their playoff run. He contributed 5 points in 17 post-season games helping the Hurricanes to their first Stanley Cup championship. Ladd is also remembered for injuring Edmonton Oilers goaltender Dwayne Roloson in game one of the Stanley Cup Final. Due to the injuries sustained in the collision, Roloson was unable to resume play for the remainder of the Stanley Cup Playoffs.

The following season, in 2006–07, Ladd solidified a roster spot with the Hurricanes, but suffered an injury for a second straight season, undergoing an emergency appendectomy on December 14, 2006. He finished the campaign with 21 points in 65 games.

==== Chicago Blackhawks ====
In the midst of his third NHL season, Ladd was traded to the Chicago Blackhawks at the trade deadline on February 26, 2008, in exchange for Tuomo Ruutu. By joining the Blackhawks, Ladd was reunited with three former minor hockey teammates, Troy Brouwer, Brent Seabrook and Colin Fraser, who all played together with the Pacific Vipers.

Ladd enjoyed a breakout season with the Blackhawks in the 2008–09 season having finished the season with 15 goals and 34 assists for 49 points in all 82 games as the Blackhawks as a team finished the season as the fourth seed in the Western Conference to qualify for the playoffs for the first time since 2002. Ladd and the Blackhawks would make a surprisingly deep playoff run in the 2009 playoffs by defeating the fifth-seeded Calgary Flames and upset the third-seeded Vancouver Canucks in the first two rounds in six games in each series but then would fall to the defending Stanley Cup Champion and second-seeded Detroit Red Wings in the Western Conference Finals in five games.

In a game against the Detroit Red Wings on March 7, 2010, Ladd scored his first NHL hat trick, though Detroit won the game 5–4. Ladd maintained his durability during the 2009–10 season having finished the season playing in all 82 games once more with 17 goals and 21 assists for 38 points recorded as the Blackhawks continued to strive as a team having clinched the second seed in the Western Conference. Ladd and the Blackhawks would go on another lengthy playoff run by defeating the seventh-seeded Nashville Predators in six games, the third-seeded Vancouver Canucks in the six games in the second round for the second straight year and sweeping the top-seeded San Jose Sharks in the Western Conference Finals before defeating the seventh-seeded Philadelphia Flyers in six games in the 2010 Stanley Cup Final as the Blackhawks won their first Stanley Cup since 1961 and fourth in franchise history and the second Stanley Cup of Ladd's career. Ladd missed the first three games of the Finals with a shoulder injury in game four of the previous series against the Sharks as a result from a collision with Sharks’ forward Patrick Marleau before returning to the lineup for the final three games of the series against the Flyers and eventually finished the 2010 playoffs playing in 19 games with three goals and three assists for six points.

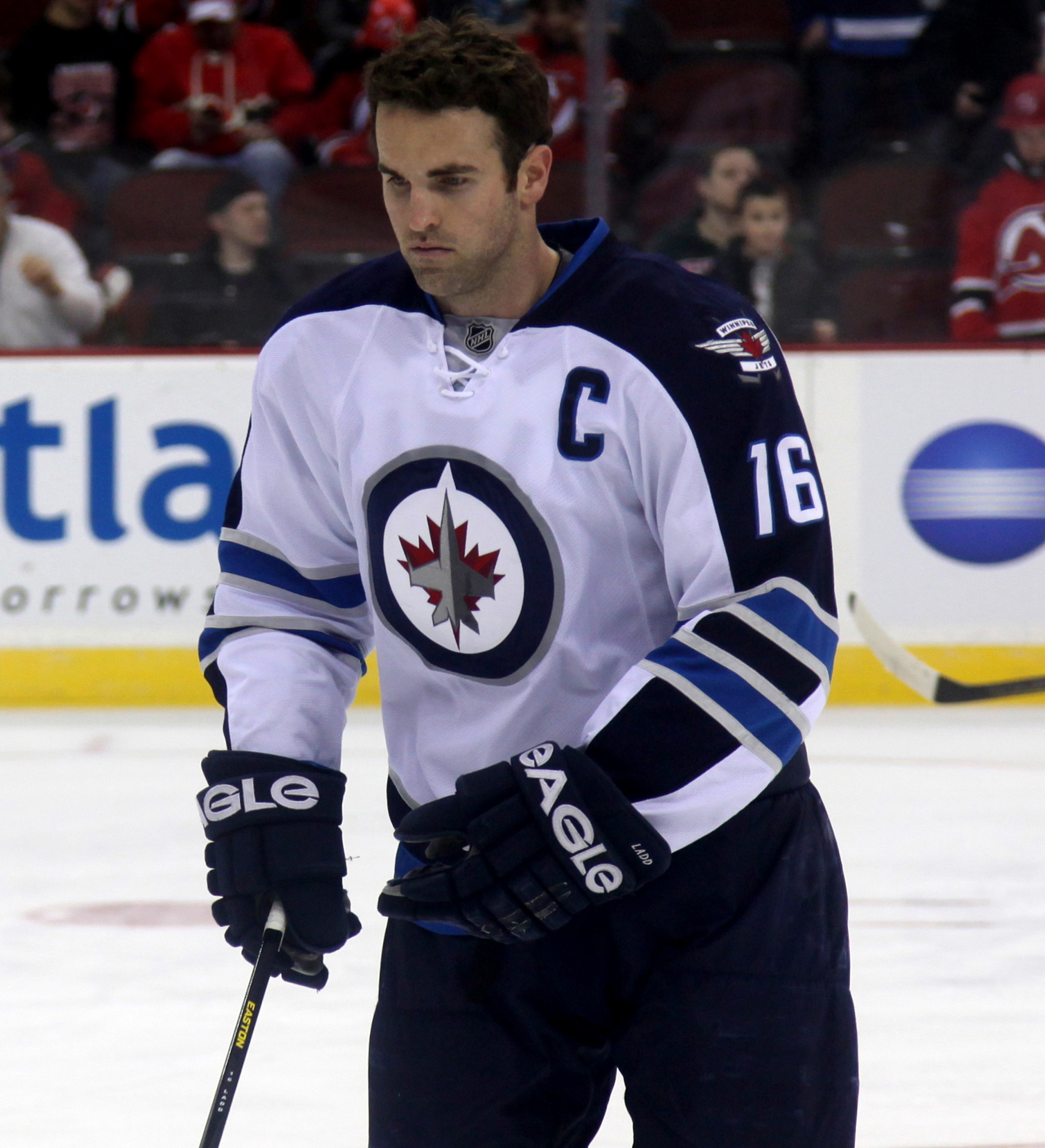
Ladd as captain of the Winnipeg Jets in March 2013

==== Atlanta Thrashers / Winnipeg Jets ====
On July 1, 2010, in a salary-cap move, Ladd was traded to the Atlanta Thrashers in exchange for defenceman Ivan Vishnevskiy and Atlanta's second-round choice in the 2011 NHL entry draft (used to select Adam Clendening), joining Dustin Byfuglien, Ben Eager and Brent Sopel, who had been traded from the Blackhawks a week earlier. During the 2010–11 season, on November 18, Ladd was named as the captain of the Thrashers, with Byfuglien and Tobias Enström as alternates. Ladd was awarded the team MVP award at the completion of the season. On November 21, Ladd recorded his 100th NHL assist on a goal by Dustin Byfuglien in a 2–1 overtime win over the New York Islanders. He ended the season with 29 goals and 30 assists for 59 points in 81 games.

On July 5, 2011, Ladd signed a five-year, US$22 million contract with the franchise, as they became the Winnipeg Jets. On November 25, Ladd scored his 100th NHL goal in a 3–1 win over his former team, the Carolina Hurricanes on Hurricanes' goaltender and former teammate Cam Ward. He finished the 2011–12 season with 28 goals and 22 assists for 50 points in all 82 games played.

On October 26, 2014, Ladd recorded his 200th NHL assist on a goal by Bryan Little in a 2–1 overtime win over the Colorado Avalanche. Ladd ended the season with 24 goals and 38 assists for 62 points in 81 games leading the team in assists and points as the Jets qualified for the playoffs for the first time since relocating from Atlanta as the team finished as the eighth and final seed in the Western Conference. In the first round of the 2015 playoffs, Ladd and the Jets would face the top-seeded Anaheim Ducks who would go on to sweep the Jets in four games. Ladd would finish the series goalless with one assist for one point on all four games.

On February 18, 2016, in a 6–5 shootout loss against the Tampa Bay Lightning, Ladd scored his 200th NHL goal on Lightning goaltender Andrei Vasilevskiy.

==== Return to Chicago ====
In the 2015–16 season, in the final year of his contract and with the Jets out of playoff contention, on February 25, 2016, Ladd was traded back to the Blackhawks (along with Jay Harrison and Matt Fraser) in exchange for Marko Daňo and a 2016 first-round draft pick. As a trade deadline rental for the defending Stanley Cup champion Blackhawks, Ladd appeared in the final 19 games of the season for the Blackhawks, where he recorded eight goals and four assists for 12 points and generally skated with captain Jonathan Toews and Andrew Shaw on the team's first line. Ladd also played in all seven of the Blackhawks games in the 2016 playoffs in their first round exit in seven games to the St. Louis Blues, tallying one goal and one assist.

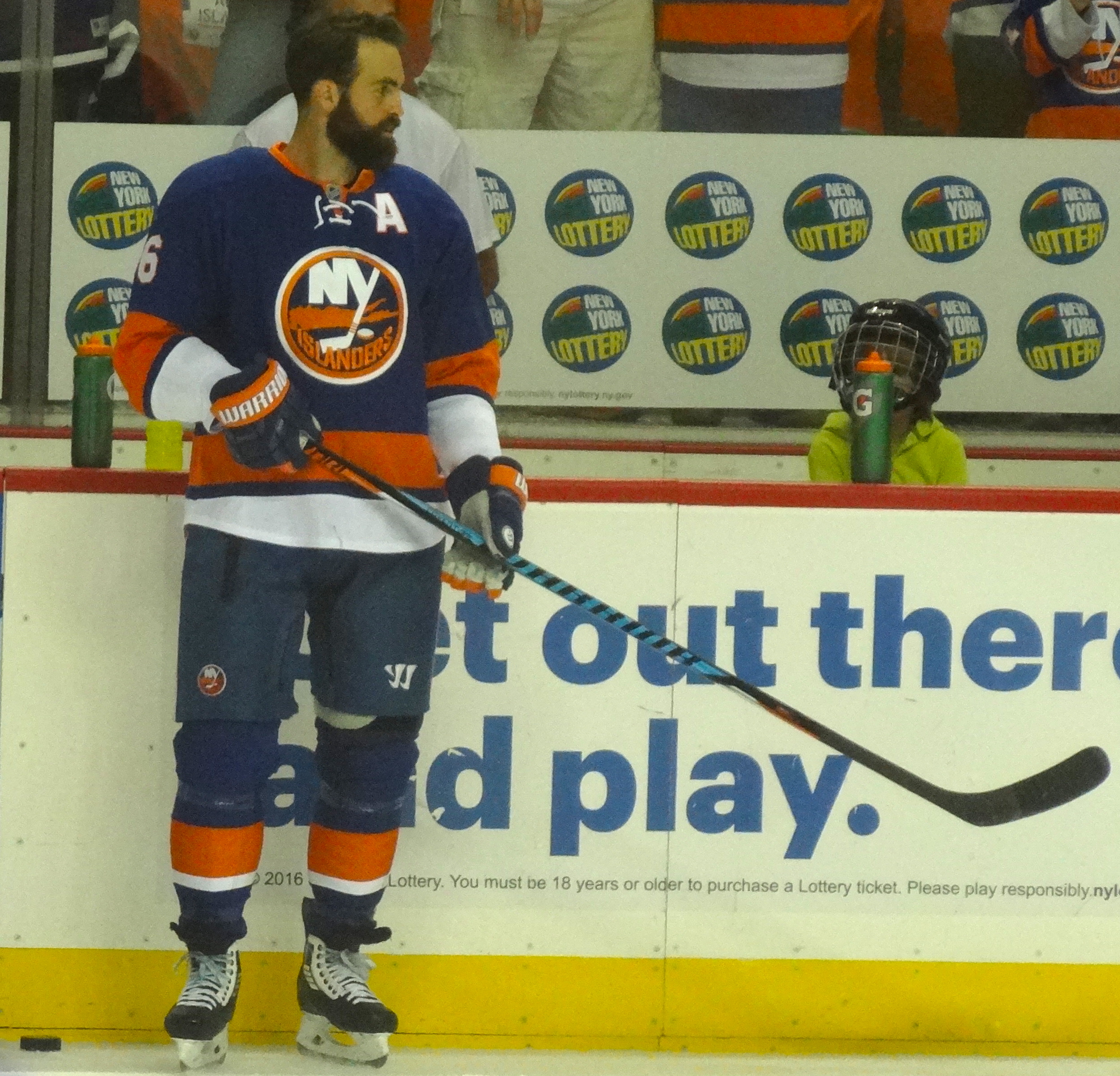
Ladd with the Islanders in October 2016

==== New York Islanders ====
On July 1, 2016, Ladd signed as a free agent to a seven-year, $38.5 million contract with the New York Islanders. Despite hoping to replace the Islanders' losses of Kyle Okposo and Frans Nielsen to free agency, Ladd struggled in his first few games with the Islanders, going his first five games without a point and his first 12 games without a goal. The subpar performance of Ladd and other Islanders players led to the mid-season firing of head coach Jack Capuano on January 17, 2017. At the time of the firing, Ladd had eight goals and four assists in 40 games, but under new head coach Doug Weight, Ladd's performance increased. Ladd scored 15 goals in the next 38 games. He finished the 2016–17 season with 23 goals, eight assists, and 31 points in 78 games played as the Islanders narrowly missed the playoffs, missing by just one point.

He would finish the 2017–18 season with 12 goals and 17 assists for 29 points in 73 contests played.

In November 2018, Ladd sustained a torn meniscus, resulting in him missing the next 44 games. On March 26, 2019, it was announced that Ladd, after appearing in 26 games through the season, would miss the remainder of the 2018–19 season and the 2019 playoffs due to a torn ACL and MCL.

On November 14, 2019, Ladd was placed on waivers by the Islanders and was then assigned to the Islanders' AHL affiliate, the Bridgeport Sound Tigers, on November 15. On December 21, 2019, Ladd was recalled to the Islanders to replace injured Islanders winger Cal Clutterbuck.

In January 2021, in preparation for the pandemic-shortened 2020–21 season, Ladd was re-assigned to directly join the Bridgeport Sound Tigers training camp.

==== Arizona Coyotes ====
Following the fifth season of his contract with the Islanders, Ladd's tenure with the club ended when he was traded to the Arizona Coyotes on July 17, 2021. The Islanders also sent Arizona second-round selections in 2021 and 2022 and a conditional third-round pick in 2023. On February 20, 2022, in a 3–1 win over the Dallas Stars, Ladd suffered an undisclosed lower-body injury, causing him to miss the next 18 games. He played his 1,000th NHL game on April 20, against his former team, the Chicago Blackhawks at Gila River Arena. Ladd would miss the final four games of the season due to an undisclosed lower-body injury in a 2–0 loss to the Washington Capitals on April 22. He finished the 2021–22 season playing in 51 games with seven goals and five assists for 12 points. At the seasons end, Ladd was named the Coyotes nominee for the Bill Masterton Memorial Trophy but was ultimately not named a top three finalist by the NHL.

Prior to the 2022–23 season, it was announced Ladd failed his physical due to a nagging knee issue and would spend the last year of his contract on the injured reserve.

On September 10, 2023, Ladd announced his retirement from the NHL.

== International play ==
Medal record

Representing Canada

Ice hockey

World Junior Championships
Gold medal – first place	2005 Grand Forks	

During his junior career, Ladd played for Team Canada at the 2005 World Junior Championships in Grand Forks, North Dakota where he was joined by former minor hockey and future Chicago Blackhawks teammates Colin Fraser and Brent Seabrook. The trio helped Canada win their first gold medal of a five-year championship run. He was chosen as an alternative captain for team Canada at the 2011 IIHF tournament.

== Career statistics ==
=== Regular season and playoffs ===
			Regular season					Playoffs
Season	Team	League	GP	G	A	Pts	PIM	GP	G	A	Pts	PIM
2001–02	Port Coquitlam Buckaroos	PIJHL	42	15	22	37	49	—	—	—	—	—
2001–02	Vancouver Giants	WHL	1	0	0	0	0	—	—	—	—	—
2002–03	Coquitlam Express	BCHL	58	15	40	55	61	—	—	—	—	—
2003–04	Calgary Hitmen	WHL	71	30	45	75	119	7	1	6	7	10
2004–05	Calgary Hitmen	WHL	65	19	26	45	167	12	7	4	11	18
2005–06	Lowell Lock Monsters	AHL	25	11	8	19	61	—	—	—	—	—
2005–06	Carolina Hurricanes	NHL	29	6	5	11	4	17	2	3	5	4
2006–07	Carolina Hurricanes	NHL	65	11	10	21	46	—	—	—	—	—
2007–08	Albany River Rats	AHL	2	1	0	1	4	—	—	—	—	—
2007–08	Carolina Hurricanes	NHL	43	9	9	18	31	—	—	—	—	—
2007–08	Chicago Blackhawks	NHL	20	5	7	12	4	—	—	—	—	—
2008–09	Chicago Blackhawks	NHL	82	15	34	49	28	17	3	1	4	12
2009–10	Chicago Blackhawks	NHL	82	17	21	38	67	19	3	3	6	12
2010–11	Atlanta Thrashers	NHL	81	29	30	59	39	—	—	—	—	—
2011–12	Winnipeg Jets	NHL	82	28	22	50	64	—	—	—	—	—
2012–13	Winnipeg Jets	NHL	48	18	28	46	22	—	—	—	—	—
2013–14	Winnipeg Jets	NHL	78	23	31	54	57	—	—	—	—	—
2014–15	Winnipeg Jets	NHL	81	24	38	62	72	4	0	1	1	4
2015–16	Winnipeg Jets	NHL	59	17	17	34	39	—	—	—	—	—
2015–16	Chicago Blackhawks	NHL	19	8	4	12	6	7	1	1	2	16
2016–17	New York Islanders	NHL	78	23	8	31	45	—	—	—	—	—
2017–18	New York Islanders	NHL	73	12	17	29	24	—	—	—	—	—
2018–19	New York Islanders	NHL	26	3	8	11	16	—	—	—	—	—
2018–19	Bridgeport Sound Tigers	AHL	2	1	4	5	2	—	—	—	—	—
2019–20	Bridgeport Sound Tigers	AHL	34	11	3	14	10	—	—	—	—	—
2019–20	New York Islanders	NHL	4	1	0	1	4	1	0	0	0	0
2020–21	Bridgeport Sound Tigers	AHL	1	0	0	0	0	—	—	—	—	—
2021–22	Arizona Coyotes	NHL	51	7	5	12	47	—	—	—	—	—
NHL totals			1,001	256	294	550	615	65	9	9	18	48

=== International ===
Year	Team	Event	Result	GP	G	A	Pts	PIM
2005	Canada	WJC	1st place, gold medalist(s)	6	3	4	7	2
2011	Canada	WC	5th	7	0	0	0	2
2012	Canada	WC	5th	8	1	4	5	2
2013	Canada	WC	5th	8	3	3	6	4
Junior totals				6	3	4	7	2
Senior totals				23	4	7	11	8

== Awards ==
- WHL Plus-Minus Award – 2004
- WHL Top Draft Prospect Award – 2004
- World Junior Championships gold medal – 2005
- 2× Stanley Cup champion – 2006, 2010

Awards and achievements
Preceded by Eric Staal	Carolina Hurricanes first-round draft pick 2004	Succeeded by Jack Johnson
Preceded by Ilya Kovalchuk	Atlanta Thrashers captain 2010–11	Succeeded by Franchise relocated to Winnipeg
Preceded by Franchise relocated from Atlanta	Winnipeg Jets captain 2011–16	Succeeded by Blake Wheeler
