= Dan Snyder Memorial Trophy =

Ontario Hockey League award

- Sport: Ice hockey
- Awarded for: OHL player who makes a notable humanitarian contribution within his community

History
- First award: 1993
- Most recent: Carson Woodall

The Dan Snyder Memorial Trophy is awarded each year to an Ontario Hockey League player who is a positive role model, and makes a notable humanitarian contribution within his community. Originally known as the OHL Humanitarian of the Year award, it was renamed in honour of former Owen Sound Platers captain Dan Snyder, who died from injuries sustained in an automobile accident in October 2003. Each winner is also nominated for the CHL Humanitarian of the Year award.

== Winners ==
List of recipients of the Dan Snyder Memorial Trophy (2004 to present), and the OHL Humanitarian of the Year award (1993 to 2003).

- Blue background denotes also named CHL Humanitarian of the Year

Season	Winner	Team
1992–93	Keli Corpse	Kingston Frontenacs
1993–94	Brent Tully	Peterborough Petes
1994–95	Brad Brown	North Bay Centennials
1995–96	Craig Mills	Belleville Bulls
1996–97	Mike Martone	Peterborough Petes
1997–98	Jason Metcalfe	London Knights
1998–99	Ryan McKie	Sudbury Wolves
1999–00	Dan Tessier	Ottawa 67's
2000–01	Joey Sullivan	Erie Otters
2001–02	David Silverstone	Belleville Bulls
2002–03	Michael Mole	Belleville Bulls
2003–04	Chris Campoli	Erie Otters
2004–05	Jeff MacDougald	Peterborough Petes
2005–06	Mike Angelidis	Owen Sound Attack
2006–07	Andrew Gibbons	Belleville Bulls
2007–08	Peter Stevens	Kingston Frontenacs
2008–09	Chris Terry	Plymouth Whalers
2009–10	Ryan Hayes	Plymouth Whalers
2010–11	Jack Walchessen	Peterborough Petes
2011–12	Andrew D'Agostini	Peterborough Petes
2012–13	Ben Fanelli	Kitchener Rangers
2013–14	Scott Simmonds	Belleville Bulls
2014–15	Nick Paul	North Bay Battalion
2015–16	Will Petschenig	Saginaw Spirit
2016–17	Garrett McFadden	Guelph Storm
2017–18	Garrett McFadden	Guelph Storm
2018–19	Nicholas Canade	Mississauga Steelheads
2019–20	Jacob Ingham	Kitchener Rangers
2020–21	Not awarded, season cancelled due to COVID-19 pandemic	
2021–22	Mark Woolley	Owen Sound Attack
2022–23	Dalyn Wakely	North Bay Battalion
2023–24	Mason Vaccari	Kingston Frontenacs
2024–25	Denver Barkey	London Knights
2025–26	Carson Woodall	Windsor Spitfires

== See also ==
- QMJHL Humanitarian of the Year
- Doug Wickenheiser Memorial Trophy – Western Hockey League Humanitarian of the Year
- List of Canadian Hockey League awards
