= Brent Seabrook =

Canadian ice hockey player (born 1985)

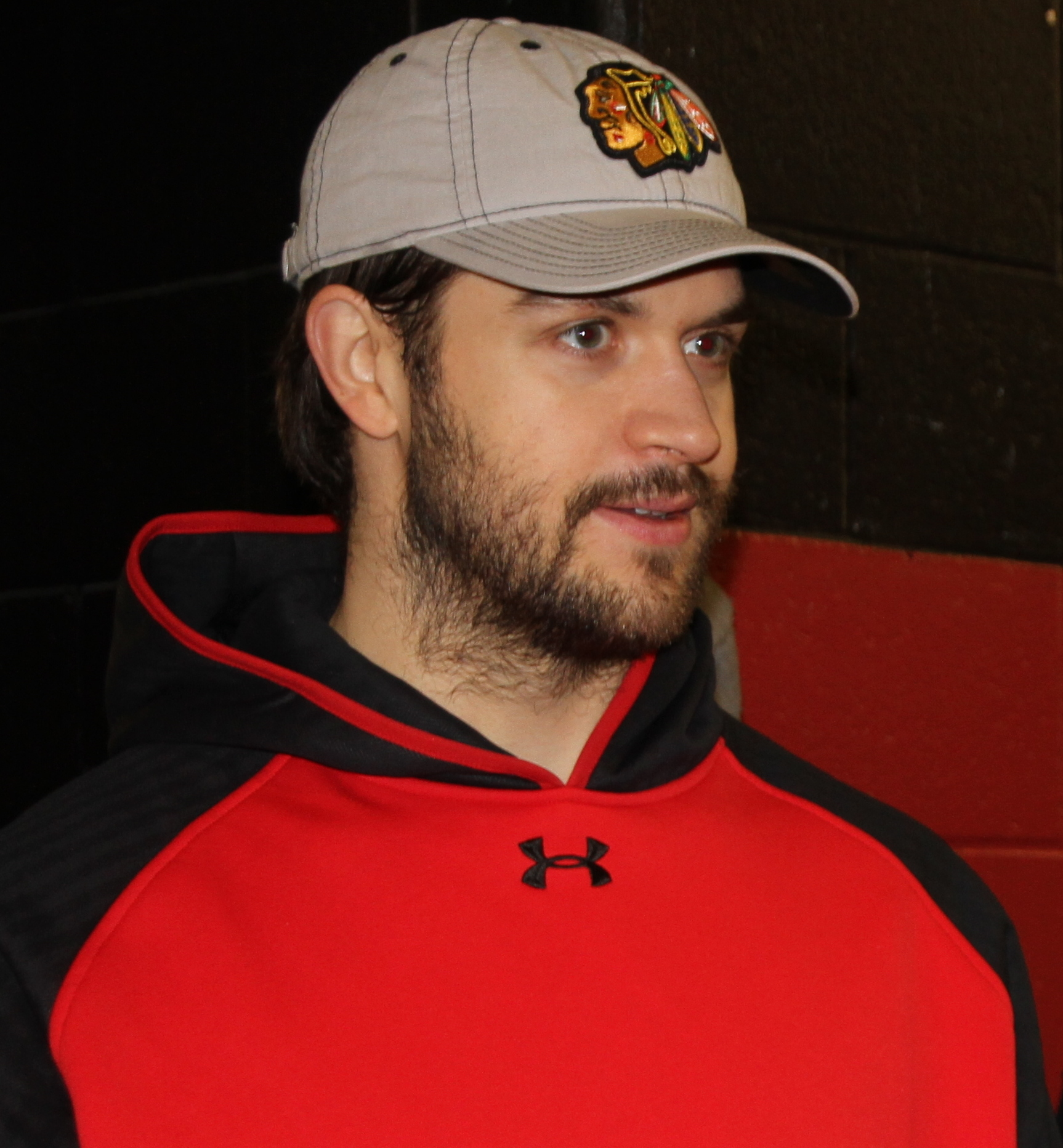
- Seabrook in December 2015
- Born: April 20, 1985 (age 41) Richmond, British Columbia, Canada
- Height: 6 ft 3 in (191 cm)
- Weight: 220 lb (100 kg; 15 st 10 lb)
- Position: Defence
- Shot: Right
- Played for: Chicago Blackhawks
- National team: Canada
- NHL draft: 14th overall, 2003; Chicago Blackhawks
- Playing career: 2005–2020

Brent Seabrook (born April 20, 1985) is a Canadian former professional ice hockey defenceman. He played fifteen seasons for the Chicago Blackhawks from 2005 to 2020. Chicago had selected him in the first round, 14th overall, in the 2003 NHL entry draft out of the Western Hockey League (WHL). He played four seasons of junior with the Lethbridge Hurricanes before joining the Blackhawks in 2005–06, becoming a key component in their success including three Stanley Cup championships. Internationally, he played for the Canadian national team and won gold medals at the 2003 IIHF World U18 Championships, 2005 World Junior Championships and 2010 Winter Olympics in Vancouver. After his playing career, he joined the Calgary Flames' player development staff in 2025.

== Playing career ==
=== Junior ===
Growing up in Tsawwassen, British Columbia, Seabrook played minor hockey with the South Delta Minor Hockey Association. He also played spring hockey with the Pacific Vipers, along with three future Chicago Blackhawks teammates, Colin Fraser, Troy Brouwer and Andrew Ladd. He went on to play major junior in the Western Hockey League (WHL) with the Lethbridge Hurricanes, who drafted him in the first round of the 2000 WHL Bantam Draft. Seabrook played with future Chicago Blackhawks teammate Kris Versteeg for three seasons in Lethbridge. After a 42-point season in 2002–03 with the Hurricanes, Seabrook was drafted 14th overall by the Chicago Blackhawks in the 2003 NHL entry draft.

=== Chicago Blackhawks ===
==== NHL debut and finding consistency (2005–2009) ====
Seabrook made his professional debut after completing his fourth and final WHL season, being assigned to the Norfolk Admirals, the Blackhawks' American Hockey League (AHL) affiliate, for the final three games of the regular season and six post-season games. Seabrook cracked the Blackhawks' line-up his first year out of junior in 2005–06 and recorded five goals and 32 points as a rookie.

In his third NHL season, in 2007–08, Seabrook matched his rookie total with 32 points while tallying a personal-best nine goals. He began the season on the top-defensive pairing with Duncan Keith.

The following season, Seabrook became an integral part of a young and rejuvenated Blackhawks team that made the Stanley Cup playoffs for the first time in seven years the following season in 2009. He scored 11 points in 17 post-season games as the Blackhawks made it to the Western Conference Finals, where they were defeated by the defending Stanley Cup champion Detroit Red Wings.

==== Stanley Cup championships, the “Mr. Overtime” era (2009–2016) ====
On October 12, 2009, Seabrook scored the overtime winning goal in a 6–5 win over the Calgary Flames on Flames' goaltender Miikka Kiprusoff as the Blackhawks (who initially had a 5–0 goal deficit) recorded the biggest comeback in franchise history. On March 17, 2010, Seabrook was knocked out by a high hit from James Wisniewski, a former teammate. Seabrook missed the next two games, while Wisniewski was ultimately suspended for eight games. On June 9, the Blackhawks won the Stanley Cup in six games after defeating the Philadelphia Flyers 4–3 in overtime in game six.

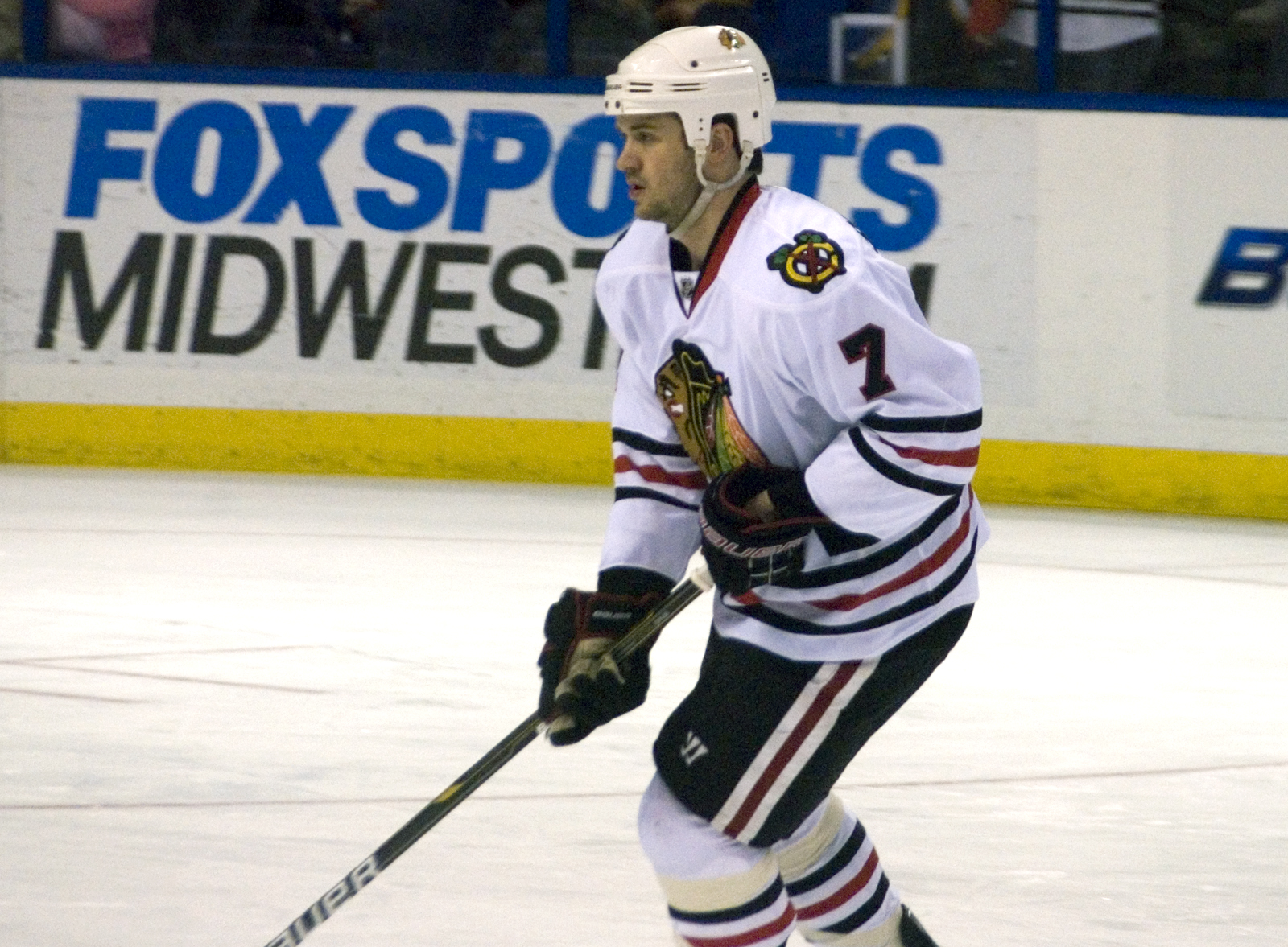
Seabrook with the Blackhawks on February 21, 2011, several days before he signed a five-year extension with the team

On February 27, 2011, the Blackhawks signed Seabrook to a five-year, $29 million contract extension.

On May 29, 2013, Seabrook scored the game seven overtime winner against Jimmy Howard of the Detroit Red Wings in the Western Conference Semi-finals, erasing a 3–1 series deficit and advancing Chicago to the Western Conference Final. In the third round, Seabrook and the Blackhawks would defeat the defending Stanley Cup champion and fifth seeded Los Angeles Kings in five games to advance to the 2013 Stanley Cup Final. During the Finals, on June 19, Seabrook scored the overtime winner against the Boston Bruins on Bruins’ goaltender Tuukka Rask in game four of the series. This goal resulted in Seabrook being referred to as “Mr. Overtime” by his peers. Seabrook and the Blackhawks would eventually beat the fourth seeded Bruins in six games giving Seabrook his second Stanley Cup.

During the first round of the 2014 playoffs, Seabrook delivered a high-hit to St. Louis Blues forward David Backes. Backes was forced to leave the game and Seabrook was assessed a match penalty. The Department of Player Safety reviewed the hit and suspended Seabrook for three games.

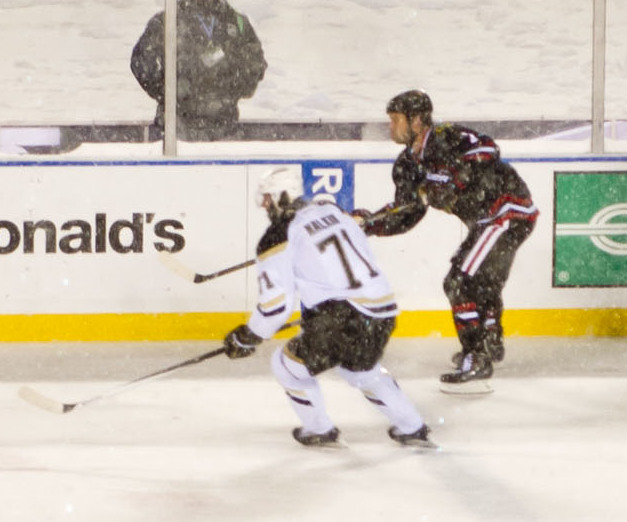
Seabrook (right) plays against Evgeni Malkin during the 2014 NHL Stadium Series in March 2014

On September 17, 2015, the Blackhawks named Seabrook as an alternate captain after longtime teammate and alternate captain Patrick Sharp was traded to the Dallas Stars earlier in the 2015 off-season. On September 26, the Blackhawks signed Seabrook to an eight-year, $55 million contract extension. Seabrook would have a career year during the 2015–16 season having recorded 14 goals and 35 assists for 49 points in 81 games along with a goal and an assist for two points in all seven games in the Blackhawks first round exit in seven games in the 2016 playoffs. The 14 goals and 49 points in the regular season were career highs.

==== Later years and injuries (2016–2020) ====
Seabrook recorded three goals and 36 assists for 39 points in 79 games in the 2016–17 season as the Blackhawks as a team finished the season as the top seed in the Western Conference before being held pointless in the Blackhawks first round exit in the opening round of the 2017 playoffs in a four game sweep at the hands of the eighth seeded Nashville Predators.

Seabrook played in his 1,000th NHL game on March 29, 2018, in a game against the Winnipeg Jets.

On December 11, 2018, Seabrook and teammate Duncan Keith became the first pair of defencemen, and the seventh duo in NHL history to play 1,000 games together.

On December 26, 2019, the Blackhawks placed Seabrook on long-term injured reserve after announcing he would require three separate surgical operations to repair his right shoulder and both hips. Seabrook missed the remainder of the 2019–20 season. He returned to practice with the team in July to prepare for the expanded 2020 playoffs, which had been postponed to August due to the COVID-19 pandemic. Seabrook opted out of the playoffs on July 24 to focus on fully recovering from his surgery.

==== Retirement ====
Seabrook intended to rejoin the Blackhawks prior to the 2020–21 season, but injured his back days before team's pre-season training camp. He was placed on injured reserve to start the season. On March 5, 2021, Seabrook announced he could no longer continue his playing career in the NHL due to injury. On July 27, 2021, the Blackhawks traded Seabrook's contract to the Tampa Bay Lightning in exchange for Tyler Johnson and a second-round draft pick in 2023. His contract expired after the 2023–24 NHL season concluded.

Seabrook played in 1,114 regular season games over 15 seasons in the NHL, where he recorded 103 goals and 361 assists. Stan Bowman, the Blackhawks' president of hockey operations, reflected on Seabrook's contributions, stating, "Without Brent Seabrook, the Chicago Blackhawks would not have three Stanley Cups. He concludes his career as not only one of the best defensemen in franchise history, but one the greatest Chicago Blackhawks of all time."

== Post-playing career ==
On June 30, 2025, Seabrook joined the Calgary Flames player development staff.

== International play ==
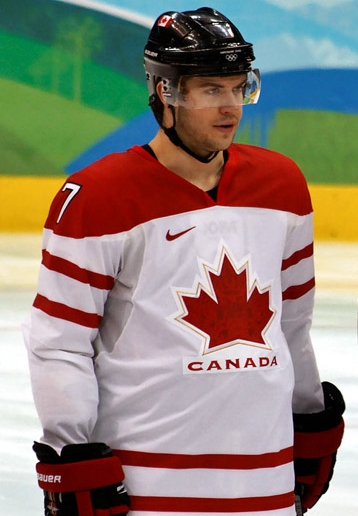
- Seabrook during the 2010 Winter Olympics

Medal record

Representing Canada

Ice hockey

Olympic Games
Gold medal – first place	2010 Vancouver	

World Junior Championships
Gold medal – first place	2005 United States	
Silver medal – second place	2004 Finland	

World U18 Championships
Gold medal – first place	2003 Russia	

During his junior career, Seabrook represented Canada in two World Junior Championships. In 2004 in Finland, he recorded three points to help Canada to the gold medal game against the United States, where they were defeated 4–3. Returning the following year in 2005 in the United States, he matched his three-point total from the previous tournament and helped defeat Russia 6–1 in the final to capture Canada's first gold medal that began a five-year run.

After his rookie season with the Blackhawks, Seabrook made his senior international debut with Canada at the 2006 World Championships in Latvia, where Canada failed to medal.

On December 30, 2009, Seabrook was called and asked to play for Canada at the 2010 Winter Olympics in Vancouver, along with Blackhawks teammates Duncan Keith and Jonathan Toews. He was expected to continue his NHL pairing with Keith during the tournament, but he instead became designated as Canada's seventh defenceman. He notched one assist over seven games as Canada won the gold medal over the United States 3–2 in overtime on February 28, 2010.

== Personal life ==
Seabrook and his wife Dayna have three children: a son and two daughters.

On February 25, 2014, Seabrook, along with Blackhawks teammate Duncan Keith, made a cameo appearance in the episode "Virgin Skin" on the NBC drama Chicago Fire. His younger brother, Keith Seabrook, was drafted by the Washington Capitals and played in the AHL from 2009 to 2012, returning in 2014 after a brief hiatus from the sport.

== Career statistics ==
=== Regular season and playoffs ===
			Regular season					Playoffs
Season	Team	League	GP	G	A	Pts	PIM	GP	G	A	Pts	PIM
2000–01	Delta Ice Hawks	PIJHL	54	16	26	42	55	17	2	5	7	12
2000–01	Lethbridge Hurricanes	WHL	4	0	0	0	0	—	—	—	—	—
2001–02	Lethbridge Hurricanes	WHL	67	6	33	39	70	4	1	1	2	2
2002–03	Lethbridge Hurricanes	WHL	69	9	33	42	113	—	—	—	—	—
2003–04	Lethbridge Hurricanes	WHL	61	12	29	41	107	—	—	—	—	—
2004–05	Lethbridge Hurricanes	WHL	63	12	42	54	107	5	1	2	3	10
2004–05	Norfolk Admirals	AHL	3	0	0	0	2	6	0	1	1	6
2005–06	Chicago Blackhawks	NHL	69	5	27	32	60	—	—	—	—	—
2006–07	Chicago Blackhawks	NHL	81	4	20	24	104	—	—	—	—	—
2007–08	Chicago Blackhawks	NHL	82	9	23	32	90	—	—	—	—	—
2008–09	Chicago Blackhawks	NHL	82	8	18	26	62	17	1	11	12	14
2009–10	Chicago Blackhawks	NHL	78	4	26	30	59	22	4	7	11	14
2010–11	Chicago Blackhawks	NHL	82	9	39	48	47	5	0	1	1	6
2011–12	Chicago Blackhawks	NHL	78	9	25	34	22	6	1	2	3	0
2012–13	Chicago Blackhawks	NHL	47	8	12	20	23	22	3	1	4	4
2013–14	Chicago Blackhawks	NHL	82	7	34	41	22	16	3	12	15	21
2014–15	Chicago Blackhawks	NHL	82	8	23	31	27	23	7	4	11	10
2015–16	Chicago Blackhawks	NHL	81	14	35	49	32	7	1	1	2	12
2016–17	Chicago Blackhawks	NHL	79	3	36	39	26	4	0	0	0	2
2017–18	Chicago Blackhawks	NHL	81	7	19	26	38	—	—	—	—	—
2018–19	Chicago Blackhawks	NHL	78	5	23	28	41	—	—	—	—	—
2019–20	Chicago Blackhawks	NHL	32	3	1	4	8	—	—	—	—	—
NHL totals			1,114	103	361	464	661	123	20	39	59	83

=== International ===
Year	Team	Event	Results	GP	G	A	Pts	PIM
2002	Canada Pacific	U17	2nd place, silver medalist(s)	6	3	3	6	16
2003	Canada	WJC18	1st place, gold medalist(s)	7	3	3	6	4
2004	Canada	WJC	2nd place, silver medalist(s)	6	1	2	3	2
2005	Canada	WJC	1st place, gold medalist(s)	5	0	3	3	0
2006	Canada	WC	4th	8	0	0	0	2
2010	Canada	OLY	1st place, gold medalist(s)	7	0	1	1	2
Junior totals				24	7	11	18	22
Senior totals				15	0	1	1	4

== Awards and honours ==
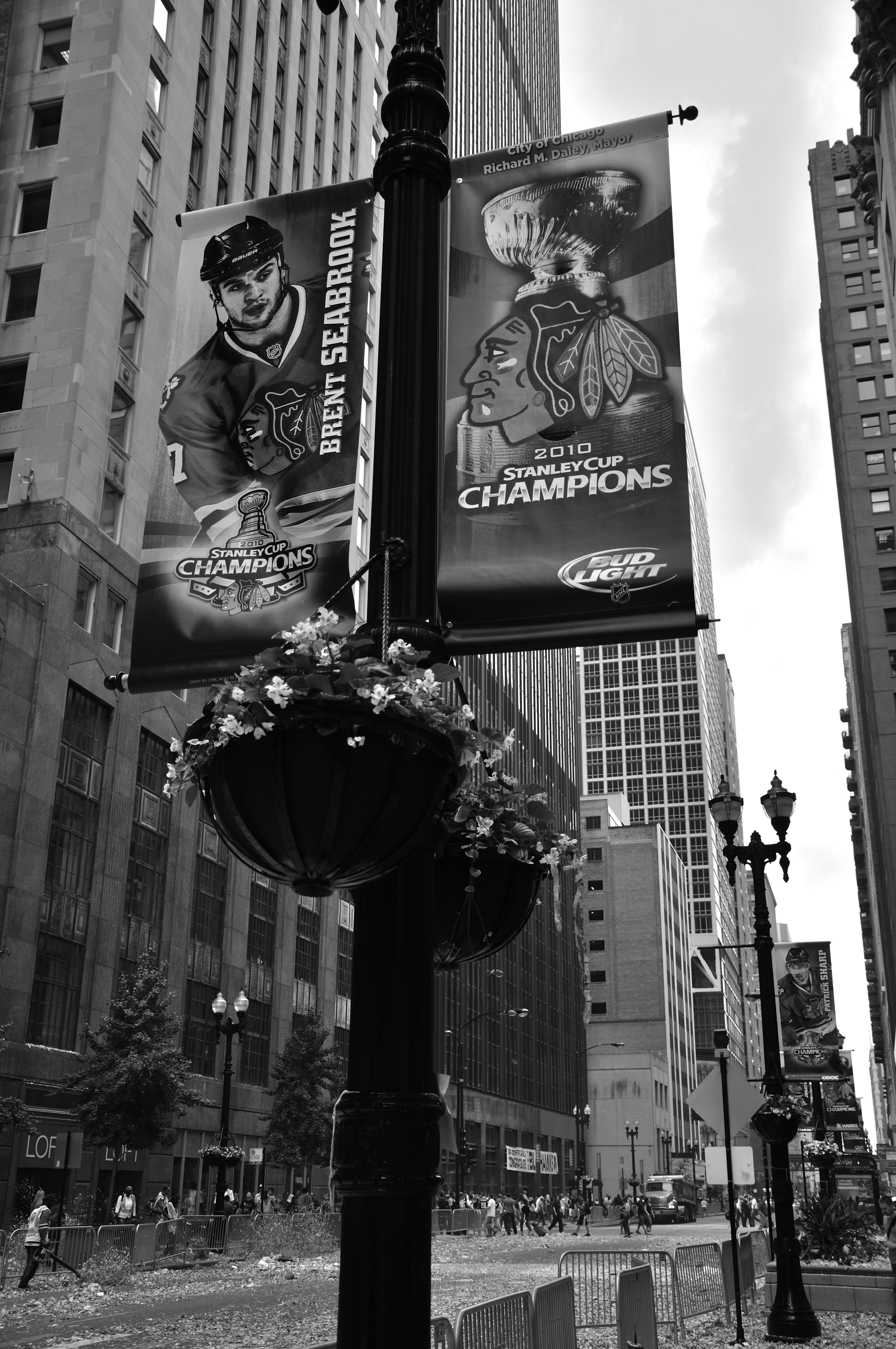
A banner depicting Seabrook at the 2010 Stanley Cup championship parade

Award	Year	Ref
WHL
CHL Top Prospects Game	2003	
East Second All-Star Team	2005	
NHL
NHL YoungStars Game	2007	
Stanley Cup champion	2010, 2013, 2015	
All-Star Game	2015	
International
WJC18 All-Star Team	2003	
WJC18 Best Defenseman	2003	
Olympic gold medal	2010	

Awards and achievements
Preceded by Anton Babchuk	Chicago Blackhawks first-round draft pick 2003	Succeeded by Cam Barker
