= Chris Campoli =

Canadian ice hockey player

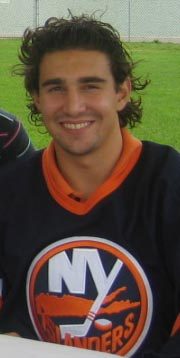
- Born: July 9, 1984 (age 42) North York, Ontario, Canada
- Height: 6 ft 1 in (185 cm)
- Weight: 190 lb (86 kg; 13 st 8 lb)
- Position: Defence
- Shot: Left
- ACH team: Dundas Real McCoys
- Played for: New York Islanders; Ottawa Senators; Chicago Blackhawks; Montreal Canadiens; EHC Biel; HC Lugano; HV71
- NHL draft: 227th overall, 2004; New York Islanders
- Playing career: 2004–2020

Christopher Campoli (born July 9, 1984) is a Canadian professional ice hockey player for the Dundas Real McCoys of the Ontario Hockey Association's Allan Cup Hockey. He played for the Chicago Blackhawks, Ottawa Senators, New York Islanders, and Montreal Canadiens in the National Hockey League (NHL).

== Playing career ==
=== Junior ===
Campoli played minor ice hockey in the Greater Toronto Hockey League (GTHL) for the Mississauga Senators. He played in the 1998 Quebec International Pee-Wee Hockey Tournament with a team from Vaughan. He then played four years in the Ontario Hockey League for the Erie Otters, from 2000 to 2004, the final season as team captain. He volunteered at the Erie Unit of the Shriners Hospital for Children, playing card and board games with the children, and assisting staff by taking height and weights of the patients. His charity work in and around the city of Erie, Pennsylvania, earned him the Dan Snyder Memorial Trophy as the OHL's top humanitarian in 2003-04.

Campoli attended John Cabot Catholic Secondary School for two years before leaving to play for the Erie Otters.

=== Professional ===
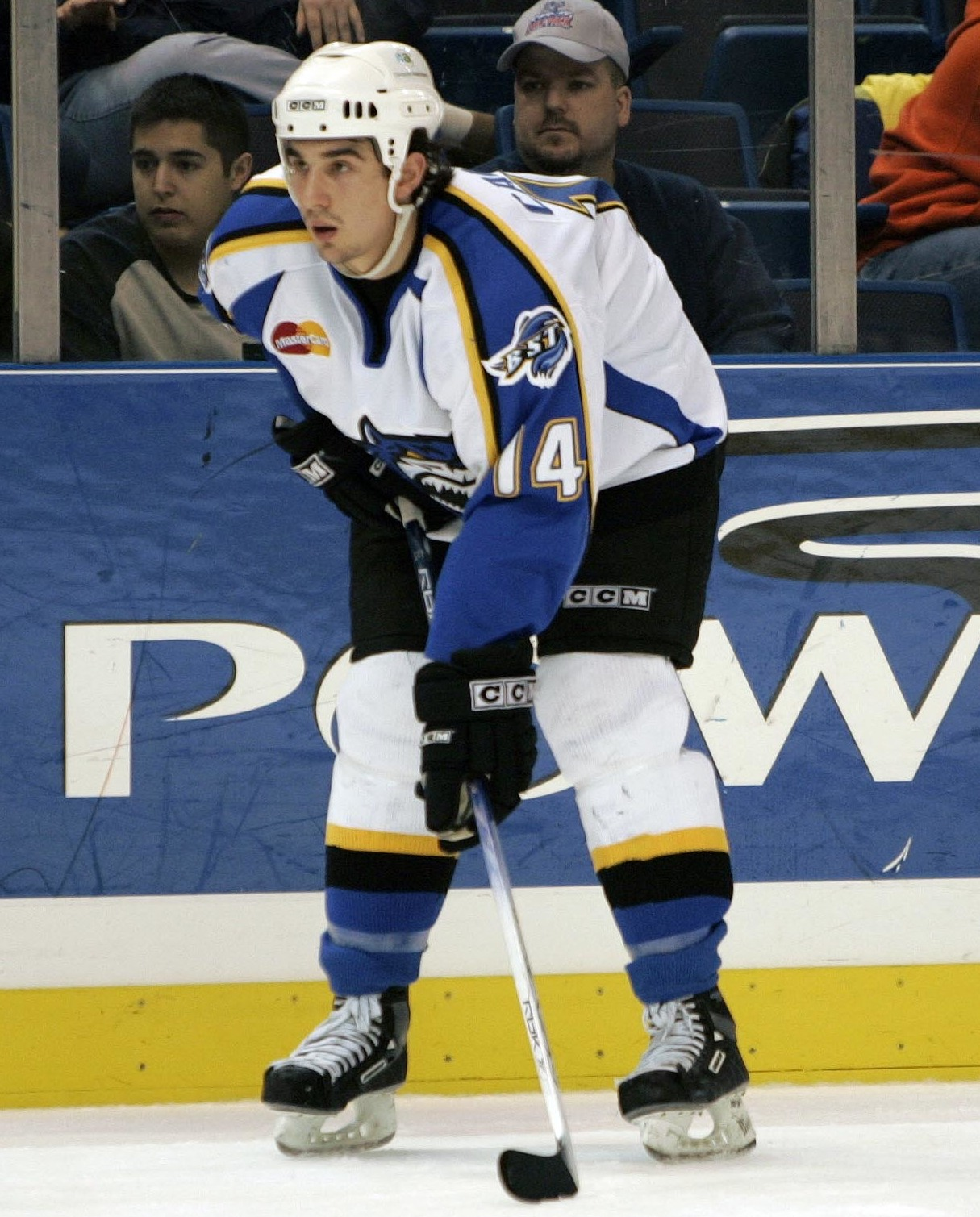
Campoli with the Bridgeport Sound Tigers in 2005

Campoli was a seventh-round selection, 227th overall by the New York Islanders in the 2004 NHL entry draft. He appeared in 80 games with the Islanders in his rookie NHL season of 2005–06, recording nine goals and twenty five assists. Campoli scored his first goal in his first game on his first shot when he beat Buffalo Sabres goaltender Ryan Miller on a rebound to tie the game at one at the 6:40 mark of the first period.

A groin injury towards the end of training camp, coupled with changes to the Islander coaching staff delayed Campoli's 2006–07 season debut. Following the trade of Alexei Zhitnik, Campoli was recalled from the Bridgeport Sound Tigers of the American Hockey League (AHL). On July 16, 2007, Campoli was signed to a three-year extension by the Islanders. On November 3, 2008, Campoli became the first player since Ken Doraty in 1934 to score in overtime twice in a game against the Columbus Blue Jackets when he fired an initial shot past goaltender Fredrik Norrena that went through the netting, but was not seen by the officials, then circled around, shot and scored again.

On February 20, 2009, Campoli was traded by the Islanders, along with Mike Comrie, to the Ottawa Senators for Dean McAmmond and a first-round draft pick in 2009.

On February 28, 2011, Campoli was traded by the Senators, along with a conditional 2011 seventh-round draft pick, to the Chicago Blackhawks for a conditional 2011 second-round draft pick and Ryan Potulny. After committing a costly turnover that allowed Alexander Burrows to score the series-winning goal against the Blackhawks, Campoli entered the 2011 off-season as a restricted free agent. According to Blackhawks general manager Stan Bowman, the two sides were far apart in contract negotiations and on July 15, 2011, Bowman announced that Campoli would not be returning to the team for the following season.

He was signed as a free agent by the Montreal Canadiens to a one-year deal just prior to the 2011–12 season on September 26, 2011. He recorded two goals and nine assists with the Canadiens but they did not renew his contract.

After failing to find an NHL club for the lockout shortened 2012–13 season, on February 7, 2013, he signed with Swiss club EHC Biel of the National League A for the remainder of the season. Campoli opted to remain in the NLA the following season, signing a one-year contract with fellow Swiss club, HC Lugano, on July 29, 2013. Early into the 2013–14 season, after only 8 games with Lugano, Campoli opted to leave the Swiss league and transfer for the remainder of the season to the Swedish Hockey League with HV71. Having established a regular role on the blueline on February 21, 2014, Campoli agreed to a two-year contract extension to remain with HV71. He finished the season with 3 goals and 9 points in 33 games.

Two years after concluding his professional career, Campoli returned to playing, agreeing to join senior men's team the Stoney Creek Generals to compete for the Allan Cup on October 18, 2018.

== Career statistics ==
=== Regular season and playoffs ===
			Regular season					Playoffs
Season	Team	League	GP	G	A	Pts	PIM	GP	G	A	Pts	PIM
2000–01	Erie Otters	OHL	52	1	9	10	47	15	0	0	0	4
2001–02	Erie Otters	OHL	68	2	24	26	117	20	0	5	5	18
2002–03	Erie Otters	OHL	60	8	40	48	82	—	—	—	—	—
2003–04	Erie Otters	OHL	67	20	46	66	66	8	0	6	6	16
2004–05	Bridgeport Sound Tigers	AHL	79	15	34	49	78	—	—	—	—	—
2005–06	New York Islanders	NHL	80	9	25	34	46	—	—	—	—	—
2006–07	New York Islanders	NHL	51	1	13	14	23	5	1	1	2	2
2006–07	Bridgeport Sound Tigers	AHL	15	3	3	6	8	—	—	—	—	—
2007–08	New York Islanders	NHL	46	4	14	18	16	—	—	—	—	—
2008–09	New York Islanders	NHL	51	6	11	17	43	—	—	—	—	—
2008–09	Ottawa Senators	NHL	25	5	8	13	12	—	—	—	—	—
2009–10	Ottawa Senators	NHL	67	4	14	18	16	6	0	2	2	4
2010–11	Ottawa Senators	NHL	58	3	11	14	34	—	—	—	—	—
2010–11	Chicago Blackhawks	NHL	19	1	6	7	2	7	0	1	1	2
2011–12	Montreal Canadiens	NHL	43	2	9	11	8	—	—	—	—	—
2012–13	EHC Biel	NLA	4	0	3	3	2	6	1	5	6	4
2013–14	HC Lugano	NLA	8	0	4	4	2	—	—	—	—	—
2013–14	HV71	SHL	33	3	6	9	34	3	0	1	1	2
2014–15	HV71	SHL	52	4	18	22	59	6	3	0	3	2
2015–16	HV71	SHL	32	3	15	18	39	6	3	2	5	0
2018–19	Stoney Creek Generals	ACH	19	3	14	17	4	7	1	1	2	2
2019–20	Brantford Blast	ACH	10	1	8	9	8	3	0	2	2	12
NHL totals			440	35	111	146	200	18	1	4	5	8
SHL totals			117	10	39	49	132	15	6	3	9	4

=== International ===
Year	Team	Event	GP	G	A	Pts	PIM
2001	Canada	U18	5	0	0	0	2
Junior totals			5	0	0	0	2

== Awards and honours ==
Award	Year
OHL
Dan Snyder Memorial Trophy	2004
Third All-Star Team	2004
CHL Humanitarian of the Year	2004
AHL
All-Rookie Team	2005
