= F. W. "Dinty" Moore Trophy =

- Sport: Ice hockey
- Awarded for: First-year goaltender with best GAA

History
- First award: 1976
- Most recent: Ryder Fetterolf

The F. W. "Dinty" Moore Trophy is awarded annually by the Ontario Hockey League to the first-year goaltender with the best goals against average during the regular season who has played a minimum of 1320 minutes in goal. The trophy is named after Port Colborne, Ontario, native Francis Moore. Moore was a member of the 1936 Port Arthur Bearcats, which won the silver medal for Canada in ice hockey at the 1936 Winter Olympics. Moore was president of the Ontario Hockey Association from 1942 to 1945, and was made a lifetime member of the OHA in 1962.

== Winners ==
List of winners of the F. W. "Dinty" Moore Trophy.

| Season | Winner | Team | GAA |
|---|---|---|---|
| 1975–76 | Mark Locken | Hamilton Fincups | 3.14 |
| 1976–77 | Barry Heard | London Knights | 3.28 |
| 1977–78 | Ken Ellacott | Peterborough Petes | 3.56 |
| 1978–79 | Nick Ricci | Niagara Falls Flyers | 3.46 |
| 1979–80 | Mike Vezina | Ottawa 67's | 3.93 |
| 1980–81 | John Vanbiesbrouck | Sault Ste. Marie Greyhounds | 4.14 |
| 1981–82 | Shawn Kilroy | Peterborough Petes | 2.97 |
| 1982–83 | Dan Burrows | Belleville Bulls | 4.13 |
| 1983–84 | Gerry Iuliano | Sault Ste. Marie Greyhounds | 3.64 |
| 1984–85 | Ron Tugnutt | Peterborough Petes | 3.77 |
| 1985–86 | Paul Henriques | Belleville Bulls | 3.60 |
| 1986–87 | Jeff Hackett | Oshawa Generals | 3.04 |
| 1987–88 | Todd Bojcun | Peterborough Petes | 2.93 |
| 1988–89 | Jeff Wilson | Kingston Raiders | 3.99 |
| 1989–90 | Sean Basilio | London Knights | 3.65 |
| 1990–91 | Kevin Hodson | Sault Ste. Marie Greyhounds | 3.22 |
| 1991–92 | Sandy Allan | North Bay Centennials | 3.85 |
| 1992–93 | Ken Shepard | Oshawa Generals | 3.48 |
| 1993–94 | Scott Roche | North Bay Centennials | 3.52 |
| 1994–95 | David MacDonald | Sudbury Wolves | 3.07 |
| 1995–96 | Brett Thompson | Guelph Storm | 3.09 |
| 1996–97 | Shawn Degagne | Kitchener Rangers | 3.29 |
| 1997–98 | Seamus Kotyk | Ottawa 67's | 2.66 |
| 1998–99 | Levente Szuper | Ottawa 67's | 2.33 |
| 1999–2000 | Andrew Sim | Sarnia Sting | 2.93 |
| 2000–01 | Andy Chiodo | Toronto St. Michael's Majors | 2.49 |
| 2001–02 | Jason Bacashihua | Plymouth Whalers | 2.34 |
| 2002–03 | Ryan Munce | Sarnia Sting | 2.64 |
| 2003–04 | Ryan MacDonald | London Knights | 2.06 |
| 2004–05 | Kyle Gajewski | Sault Ste. Marie Greyhounds | 2.55 |
| 2005–06 | Trevor Cann | Peterborough Petes | 2.65 |
| 2006–07 | Michal Neuvirth | Plymouth Whalers | 2.32 |
| 2007–08 | Josh Unice | Kitchener Rangers | 2.45 |
| 2008–09 | J. P. Anderson | Mississauga St. Michael's Majors | 2.94 |
| 2009–10 | Petr Mrazek | Ottawa 67's | 3.00 |
| 2010–11 | Matej Machovsky | Brampton Battalion | 2.90 |
| 2011–12 | Daniel Altshuller | Oshawa Generals | 3.55 |
| 2012–13 | Alex Nedeljkovic | Plymouth Whalers | 2.28 |
| 2013–14 | Matthew Mancina | Guelph Storm | 2.43 |
| 2014–15 | Michael McNiven | Owen Sound Attack | 2.79 |
| 2015–16 | Michael DiPietro | Windsor Spitfires | 2.45 |
| 2016–17 | Matthew Villalta | Sault Ste. Marie Greyhounds | 2.41 |
| 2017–18 | Jordan Kooy | London Knights | 3.11 |
| 2018–19 | Ethan Taylor | Sault Ste. Marie Greyhounds | 3.24 |
| 2019–20 | Brett Brochu | London Knights | 2.40 |
| 2020–21 | Not awarded, season cancelled due to COVID-19 pandemic | | |
| 2021–22 | Dom DiVincentiis | North Bay Battalion | 2.59 |
| 2022–23 | Zach Bowen | London Knights | 3.10 |
| 2023–24 | Jack Ivankovic | Mississauga Steelheads | 2.72 |
| 2024–25 | Alexei Medvedev | London Knights | 2.79 |
| 2025–26 | Ryder Fetterolf | Ottawa 67's | 2.07 |

== See also ==
- List of Canadian Hockey League awards
