= Michael McNiven =

Canadian ice hockey goaltender

- Born: July 9, 1997 (age 29) Winnipeg, Manitoba, Canada
- Height: 6 ft 1 in (185 cm)
- Weight: 199 lb (90 kg; 14 st 3 lb)
- Position: Goaltender
- Caught: Left
- Played for: Montreal Canadiens; Rapaces de Gap
- NHL draft: Undrafted
- Playing career: 2018–2024

Michael McNiven (born July 9, 1997) is a Canadian former professional ice hockey goaltender. Originally undrafted by teams in the National Hockey League (NHL), McNiven played seven seasons of professional ice hockey between 2018–2024, mostly in the Montreal Canadiens organization.

== Early life ==
McNiven was born in Winnipeg, Manitoba. After his parents were unable to take care of him, he was raised by his paternal grandparents, Jim and Christine. Although he had limited contact with his mother, McNiven's relationship with his father improved throughout his adolescence. He spent the 2012–13 minor ice hockey season as a goaltender for the Halton Hurricanes of the South-Central Triple A Hockey League (SCTA), where he posted an 11–9 record and 1.48 goals against average (GAA).

== Playing career ==
=== Junior ===
McNiven joined the Georgetown Raiders of the Ontario Junior Hockey League (OJHL) for the 2013–14 season; at 16 years old, he was younger than many other players in the league, who were around the age of 20. McNiven finished the season with a 21–10 record and a .915 save percentage; despite not being expected to make the OJHL playoffs, the Raiders defeated both the Milton Menace and the Buffalo Jr. Sabres before falling to the Toronto Lakeshore Patriots in the West conference finals.

The Owen Sound Attack of the Ontario Hockey League (OHL) selected McNiven in the fourth round of the 2013 OHL Priority Selection, and he signed with the team that year. On February 15, 2017, McNiven stopped all 16 shots he faced for his 10th career junior ice hockey shutout, passing Jordan Binnington for the most in Attack history. That May, he was awarded both the Jim Rutherford Trophy as the best goaltender in the OHL, and the CHL Goaltender of the Year award. He finished the season with a 41–9–4 record, 2.30 GAA, .915 save percentage, and six shutouts in 54 games.

=== Professional ===
After going undrafted in the 2015 NHL entry draft, the Montreal Canadiens of the National Hockey League (NHL) signed McNiven to a three-year, entry-level contract on September 24, 2015. He made his NHL debut on January 24, 2022, relieving Cayden Primeau in the third period of an 8–2 loss to the Minnesota Wild. Primeau left the game after allowing five goals on 32 shots, while McNiven allowed an additional three on seven shots. On March 2, 2022, McNiven was traded to the Calgary Flames in exchange for future considerations. Before he made an appearance within the Flames organization, McNiven was again traded to the Ottawa Senators in exchange for future considerations on March 21, 2022.

As a free agent from the Senators after his contract, McNiven went unsigned over the summer. Approaching the 2022–23 season without an NHL or American Hockey League (AHL) offer, McNiven was signed to a contract with the Greenville Swamp Rabbits of the ECHL on October 10, 2022.

In November 2023, McNiven agreed to a one-year contract to join the Wheeling Nailers for the 2023–24 season. After appearing in six games for the Nailers, posting a 3.98 GAA and a save percentage of 0.859, McNiven was traded to the Savannah Ghost Pirates on December 6, 2023. Just over a month later, McNiven would be traded to the Cincinnati Cyclones on January 26, 2024, his second transaction of the season. However, McNiven opted to continue his professional career overseas, agreeing to a contract with the France-based Rapaces de Gap of the Ligue Magnus in early February 2024.

In August 2024, McNiven announced his retirement from active play. He subsequently took an assistant coaching position with the Powell River Kings of the British Columbia Hockey League (BCHL) beginning in the 2024–25 season.

== Career statistics ==
			Regular season									Playoffs
Season	Team	League	GP	W	L	OTL	MIN	GA	SO	GAA	SV%	GP	W	L	MIN	GA	SO	GAA	SV%
2013–14	Georgetown Raiders	OJHL	35	21	10	0	1,891	82	5	2.60	890	13	8	5	778	35	0	2.70	.908
2014–15	Owen Sound Attack	OHL	24	15	8	0	1,334	62	2	2.79	.914	—	—	—	—	—	—	—	—
2015–16	Owen Sound Attack	OHL	53	21	18	10	2,964	145	3	2.94	.902	6	2	4	360	22	1	3.67	.875
2016–17	Owen Sound Attack	OHL	54	41	9	4	3,184	122	6	2.30	.915	17	10	7	992	46	2	2.78	.908
2017–18	Laval Rocket	AHL	25	6	16	2	1,407	82	0	3.50	.884	—	—	—	—	—	—	—	—
2017–18	Brampton Beast	ECHL	4	0	2	1	201	14	1	4.19	.868	—	—	—	—	—	—	—	—
2018–19	Laval Rocket	AHL	30	11	12	6	1,619	68	2	2.52	.902	—	—	—	—	—	—	—	—
2018–19	Brampton Beast	ECHL	1	1	0	0	62	2	0	1.94	.935	—	—	—	—	—	—	—	—
2019–20	Laval Rocket	AHL	3	3	0	0	180	7	0	2.33	.919	—	—	—	—	—	—	—	—
2019–20	Adirondack Thunder	ECHL	4	3	1	0	240	7	2	1.75	.941	—	—	—	—	—	—	—	—
2019–20	Jacksonville IceMen	ECHL	10	4	5	1	559	26	1	2.79	.915	—	—	—	—	—	—	—	—
2019–20	Norfolk Admirals	ECHL	8	2	5	1	476	33	0	4.16	.889	—	—	—	—	—	—	—	—
2020–21	Laval Rocket	AHL	13	7	3	3	787	34	1	2.59	.895	—	—	—	—	—	—	—	—
2021–22	Laval Rocket	AHL	11	4	4	1	520	35	1	4.04	.869	—	—	—	—	—	—	—	—
2021–22	Montreal Canadiens	NHL	1	0	0	0	20	3	0	9.00	.571	—	—	—	—	—	—	—	—
2021–22	Belleville Senators	AHL	2	0	0	1	100	6	0	3.61	.878	—	—	—	—	—	—	—	—
2022–23	Greenville Swamp Rabbits	ECHL	8	4	1	2	472	20	0	2.54	.913	—	—	—	—	—	—	—	—
2023–24	Wheeling Nailers	ECHL	6	2	2	1	331	22	0	3.98	.859	—	—	—	—	—	—	—	—
2023–24	Savannah Ghost Pirates	ECHL	7	0	4	1	328	16	0	2.93	.886	—	—	—	—	—	—	—	—
2023–24	Rapaces de Gap	Ligue Magnus	7	2	5	0	389	23	0	3.29	.893	—	—	—	—	—	—	—	—
NHL totals			1	0	0	0	20	3	0	9.00	.571	—	—	—	—	—	—	—	—

== Awards and honours ==
Award	Year	Ref
OHL
CHL/NHL Top Prospects Game	2014–15	
F. W. "Dinty" Moore Trophy	2014–15	
First All-Rookie Team	2014–15	
Dave Pinkney Trophy	2016–17 (Note: Split with Emanuel Vella as a team award for the Owen Sound Attack.)	
Jim Rutherford Trophy	2016–17	
First All-Star Team	2016–17	
CHL Goaltender of the Year	2016–17	
ECHL
All-Star Game	2023–24	
