= Jim Rutherford Trophy =

- Sport: Ice hockey
- Awarded for: Best goaltender in OHL

History
- First award: 2020
- Most recent: Ryder Fetterolf (2025–26)

The Jim Rutherford Trophy is given to the best goaltender in the Ontario Hockey League, as voted by coaches and general managers. The winner is also nominated for the CHL Goaltender of the Year award.

From 1988 until 2019, the award was named the Ontario Hockey League Goaltender of the Year Award. On May 19, 2020, the OHL unveiled the Jim Rutherford Trophy, in honour of former goaltender Jim Rutherford. Rutherford played with the Hamilton Red Wings from 1967-69 before playing in the National Hockey League with the Detroit Red Wings, Pittsburgh Penguins, Toronto Maple Leafs and Los Angeles Kings from 1970-83. Following his playing career, Rutherford joined the Windsor Compuware Spitfires as the general manager of the team from 1984-88, winning the J. Ross Robertson Cup in the 1987-88 season. In 1990, Rutherford became the general manager and president of the Detroit Compuware Ambassadors. He remained in this position as they were renamed the Detroit Junior Red Wings in 1992 until accepting a job promotion to become the general manager, president, and minority owner of the Hartford Whalers in 1994. Rutherford remained with the club as general manager when they relocated and became the Carolina Hurricanes in 1997. In 2006, Rutherford won the Stanley Cup with the Hurricanes. He stayed with the club until 2014 before stepping down and selling his shares in the Hurricanes to become the general manager of the Pittsburgh Penguins. With the Penguins, Rutherford has won the Stanley Cup two more times, in 2016 and 2017. Rutherford was named to the Hockey Hall of Fame in 2019.

== Winners ==
Prior to 2020, the Jim Rutherford Trophy was called the Ontario Hockey Goaltender of the Year.

denotes player also named CHL Goaltender of the Year

| Season | Winner | Team |
|---|---|---|
| 1987–88 | Rick Tabaracci | Cornwall Royals |
| 1988–89 | Gus Morschauser | Kitchener Rangers |
| 1989–90 | Jeff Fife | Belleville Bulls |
| 1990–91 | Mike Torchia | Kitchener Rangers |
| 1991–92 | Mike Fountain | Oshawa Generals |
| 1992–93 | Manny Legace | Niagara Falls Thunder |
| 1993–94 | Jamie Storr | Owen Sound Platers |
| 1994–95 | Tyler Moss | Kingston Frontenacs |
| 1995–96 | Craig Hillier | Ottawa 67's |
| 1996–97 | Zac Bierk | Peterborough Petes |
| 1997–98 | Bujar Amidovski | Toronto St. Michael's Majors |
| 1998–99 | Brian Finley | Barrie Colts |
| 1999–2000 | Andrew Raycroft | Kingston Frontenacs |
| 2000–01 | Craig Anderson | Guelph Storm |
| 2001–02 | Ray Emery | Sault Ste. Marie Greyhounds |
| 2002–03 | Andy Chiodo | Toronto St. Michael's Majors |
| 2003–04 | Paulo Colaiacovo | Barrie Colts |
| 2004–05 | Michael Ouzas | Mississauga IceDogs |
| 2005–06 | Adam Dennis | London Knights |
| 2006–07 | Steve Mason | London Knights |
| 2007–08 | Mike Murphy | Belleville Bulls |
| 2008–09 | Mike Murphy | Belleville Bulls |
| 2009–10 | Chris Carrozzi | Mississauga St. Michael's Majors |
| 2010–11 | Mark Visentin | Niagara IceDogs |
| 2011–12 | Michael Houser | London Knights |
| 2012–13 | Jordan Binnington | Owen Sound Attack |
| 2013–14 | Alex Nedeljkovic | Plymouth Whalers |
| 2014–15 | Lucas Peressini | Kingston Frontenacs |
| 2015–16 | Mackenzie Blackwood | Barrie Colts |
| 2016–17 | Michael McNiven | Owen Sound Attack |
| 2017–18 | Michael DiPietro | Windsor Spitfires |
| 2018–19 | Ukko-Pekka Luukkonen | Sudbury Wolves |
| 2019–20 | first year as renamed Jim Rutherford Trophy | |
| 2019–20 | Nico Daws | Guelph Storm |
| 2020–21 | not awarded, season cancelled due to COVID-19 pandemic | |
| 2021–22 | Brett Brochu | London Knights |
| 2022–23 | Dom DiVincentiis | North Bay Battalion |
| 2023–24 | Jacob Oster | Oshawa Generals |
| 2024–25 | Jackson Parsons | Kitchener Rangers |
| 2025–26 | Ryder Fetterolf | Ottawa 67's |

== See also ==
- Patrick Roy Trophy – Quebec Major Junior Hockey League top goaltender
- Del Wilson Trophy – Western Hockey League top goaltender
- List of Canadian Hockey League awards
