= Guelph Storm =

Ontario Hockey League team in Guelph

- City: Guelph, Ontario
- League: Ontario Hockey League
- Conference: Western
- Division: Midwest
- Founded: 1991–92
- Home arena: Sleeman Centre
- Colours: Crimson, white, and black
- Owners: Joel Feldberg; Jeffrey Bly
- General manager: George Burnett
- Head coach: Cory Stillman
- Affiliates: Ayr Centennials
- Website: www.guelphstorm.com

Franchise history
- 1904–1989: Toronto Marlboros
- 1989–1991: Dukes of Hamilton
- 1991–present: Guelph Storm

Championships
- Playoff championships: OHL (4): 1998, 2004, 2014, 2019

Current uniform

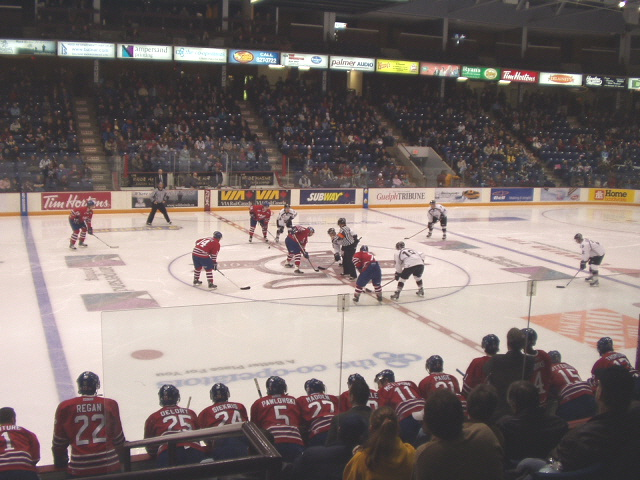
Guelph Storm face off on home ice. February 15th, 2006

The Guelph Storm are a Canadian junior ice hockey team based in Guelph, Ontario. They have played in the Ontario Hockey League since the 1991–92 season. The team plays home games at the Sleeman Centre.

== History ==
The franchise started as the Toronto Marlboros, who moved to Hamilton to become the Dukes of Hamilton in 1989. Following the 1990–91 season, the franchise was relocated to Guelph and a contest was held to name the team. Tom Douglas submitted the winning entry "Storm" and the team was renamed the Guelph Storm.

The first year in Guelph was dismal, but the building process for Guelph was soon successful. The Storm finished first place in the 1994–95 season. General Manager Mike Kelly was voted the OHL Executive of the Year and Craig Hartsburg voted the Coach of the Year for the Canadian Hockey League and the Ontario Hockey League. Draft picks from the early years in Guelph include Jeff O'Neill and Todd Bertuzzi.

Guelph reached the OHL finals in 1995 and 1996. The team qualified for the 1996 Memorial Cup by playing against the Memorial Cup host Peterborough Petes in the OHL final.

The Storm won their first J. Ross Robertson Cup in 1998. This success continued into the Memorial Cup Tournament as the Storm rallied to the Championship Game where they lost to the Portland Winter Hawks in overtime in the final game.

In the year 2000, the team moved from the historic but aging Guelph Memorial Gardens into the Guelph Sports and Entertainment Centre (since renamed the Sleeman Centre). The Storm were selected to host the 2002 Memorial Cup tournament. It marked the team's third appearance in the national junior championship, their first as host team.

Two years later, the Storm won their second OHL Championship, and returned to the 2004 Memorial Cup hosted in Kelowna, British Columbia.

In the 2008 NHL entry draft, defenceman Drew Doughty was selected 2nd overall by the Los Angeles Kings, the highest ever selection of a Guelph Storm player.

In 2014, the Storm captured their third OHL Championship, and subsequently advanced to the 2014 Memorial Cup final, hosted in London, Ontario. The Edmonton Oil Kings won Cup championship on 25 May 2014 with a 6-3 win over the Storm.

In late April 2019, the team captured the Wayne Gretzky Trophy as 2019 OHL Western Conference Champions again winning the J. Ross Robertson Cup. On 12 May 2019, in the sixth game of the finals, the Storm defeated the Ottawa 67's to win the OHL championship and were again headed to the Memorial Cup, their sixth appearance, to start on 17 May in Halifax. Nick Suzuki (a Montreal Canadiens prospect) earned the Wayne Gretzky 99 Award as OHL Playoff MVP. He was the third Storm player in the team's history to win this award.

In 2021, the team agreed to stop using the song Cotton Eye Joe by the group Rednex during games after consultation with local groups alleging the song has racist origins.

== Championships ==
The Guelph Storm have appeared in the Memorial Cup tournament six times, won the J. Ross Robertson Cup four times, won the Hamilton Spectator Trophy four times, and have won five division titles.

Memorial Cup

- 1996 – Finished in 4th place
- 1998 – Lost to Portland Winter Hawks
- 2002 – Finished in 4th place
- 2004 – Finished in 4th place
- 2014 – Lost to Edmonton Oil Kings
- 2019 – Lost to Rouyn-Noranda Huskies
- 2027 –

J. Ross Robertson Cup

- 1995 – Lost to Detroit Jr. Red Wings
- 1996 – Lost to Peterborough Petes
- 1998 – OHL Champions vs. Ottawa 67's
- 2004 – OHL Champions vs. Mississauga IceDogs
- 2014 – OHL Champions vs. North Bay Battalion
- 2019 – OHL Champions vs. Ottawa 67's

Wayne Gretzky Trophy

- 2003–04 – Western Conference Champions
- 2013–14 – Western Conference Champions
- 2018–19 – Western Conference Champions

Hamilton Spectator Trophy

- 1994–95 – 47 W, 14 L, 5 T, 99 points
- 1995–96 – 45 W, 16 L, 5 T, 95 points
- 1997–98 – 42 W, 17 L, 6 T, 1 OTL, 91 points
- 2013–14 – 52 W, 12 L, 4 OTL, 108 points

Division Trophies

- 1994–95 – Emms Trophy, Central Division
- 1995–96 – Emms Trophy, Central Division
- 1997–98 – Emms Trophy, Central Division
- 1998–99 – Holody Trophy, Midwest Division
- 2013–14 – Holody Trophy, Midwest Division

== Head coaches ==
Guelph Storm head coaches have been awarded the Matt Leyden Trophy as the OHL coach-of-the-year twice in team history. Craig Hartsburg was awarded the Matt Leyden Trophy for the 1994–95 season, and was also voted the Canadian Hockey League coach-of-the-year the same year. Dave Barr won the Matt Leyden Trophy in 2005–06.

List of coaches with multiple seasons in parentheses.

- 1991–1992 – Ron Ivany, Mike Kelly, Bill LaForge
- 1992–1994 – John Lovell (2)
- 1994–1995 – Craig Hartsburg
- 1995–1997 – E.J. McGuire (2)
- 1997–1998 – George Burnett (5)
- 1998–1999 – Geoff Ward
- 1999–2000 – Paul Gillis
- 2000–2002 – Jeff Jackson (3)
- 2002–2003 – Jeff Jackson, Shawn Camp
- 2003–2004 – Shawn Camp (2)
- 2004–2008 – Dave Barr (4)
- 2008–2010 – Jason Brooks (2)
- 2010 (interim) – Mike Kelly
- 2010–2015 – Scott Walker (5)
- 2015–2016 – Bill Stewart
- 2015 (interim) – Mike Kelly
- 2015–2017 – Jarrod Skalde (2)
- 2017–2022 – George Burnett (5)
- Sept.–Nov. 2022 – Scott Walker
- 2022–2024 – Chad Wiseman
- 2024–present – Cory Stillman

== General managers ==
A Guelph Storm executive has won the OHL Executive of the Year on two occasions while the honour was awarded from 1990 to 2013. General manager Mike Kelly won the award in 1994–95 and team governor Rick Gaetz won the award in 2009–10.

List of General Managers with multiple seasons in parentheses.

- 1991–1997 – Mike Kelly (12)
- 1997–2003 – Alan Millar (6)
- 2003–2008 – Dave Barr (5)
- 2009–2010 – Jason Brooks
- 2010–2016 – Mike Kelly
- 2017–present – George Burnett (6)

== Players ==
=== Award winners ===
- 1991–92 – Jeff O'Neill, Jack Ferguson Award (First Overall draft pick)
- 1992–93 – Jeff O'Neill, Emms Family Award (Rookie of the Year)
- 1993–94 – Jeff O'Neill, CHL Top Draft Prospect Award
- 1994–95 – Jamie Wright, Bobby Smith Trophy (Scholastic Player of the Year)
- 1994–95 – Mark McArthur and Andy Adams, Dave Pinkney Trophy (Lowest team GAA)
- 1994–95 – Mike Kelly, OHL Executive of the Year
- 1995–96 – Dan Cloutier and Brett Thompson, Dave Pinkney Trophy (Lowest team GAA)
- 1995–96 – Brett Thompson, F.W. 'Dinty' Moore Trophy (Best rookie GAA)
- 1995–96 – Jeff Williams, William Hanley Trophy (Most Sportsmanlike Player)
- 1997–98 – Manny Malhotra, Bobby Smith Trophy (Scholastic Player of the Year)
- 2000–01 – Craig Anderson, OHL Goaltender of the Year
- 2000–01 – Dustin Brown, Bobby Smith Trophy (Scholastic Player of the Year)
- 2001–02 – Dustin Brown, Bobby Smith Trophy (Scholastic Player of the Year)
- 2002–03 – Dustin Brown, Canadian Hockey League Scholastic Player of the Year and Bobby Smith Trophy (Scholastic Player of the Year)
- 2003–04 – Martin St. Pierre, Leo Lalonde Memorial Trophy (Overage Player of the Year)
- 2003–04 – Martin St. Pierre, Wayne Gretzky 99 Award (Playoffs MVP)
- 2005–06 – Ryan Callahan, Leo Lalonde Memorial Trophy (Overage Player of the Year)
- 2007–08 – Drew Doughty, Max Kaminsky Trophy (Most Outstanding Defenceman)
- 2008–09 – Tim Priamo, Roger Neilson Memorial Award (Top Academic College/University Player)
- 2009–10 – Taylor Beck, Jim Mahon Memorial Trophy (Top Scoring Right Winger)
- 2009–10 – Rick Gaetz, OHL Executive of the Year
- 2010–11 – Matej Machovsky, F.W. 'Dinty' Moore Trophy (Best rookie GAA)
- 2013–14 – Robby Fabbri, Wayne Gretzky 99 Award (Playoffs MVP)
- 2013–14 – Adam Craievich, Ivan Tennant Memorial Award (Top Academic High School Student)
- 2013–14 – Matt Finn, Mickey Renaud Captain's Trophy (Leadership Award)
- 2014–15 – Justin Nichols, Roger Neilson Memorial Award (Top Academic College/University Player)
- 2015-16 – Ryan Merkley, Jack Ferguson Award (First overall draft pick)
- 2016–17 – Quinn Hanna, Ivan Tennant Memorial Award (Top Academic High School Student)
- 2016–17 – Garrett McFadden, Dan Snyder Memorial Award (OHL Humanitarian of the Year)
- 2016–17 – Ryan Merkley, Emms Family Award (Rookie of the Year)
- 2017–18 – Garrett McFadden, Dan Snyder Memorial Award (OHL Humanitarian of the Year)
- 2018–19 – Isaac Ratcliffe, Mickey Renaud Captain's Trophy (Leadership Award)
- 2018–19 – Nick Suzuki, Wayne Gretzky 99 Award (Playoffs MVP)
- 2018–19 – Nick Suzuki, William Hanley Trophy (Most Sportsmanlike Player)
- 2018–19 – Zack Terry, Ivan Tennant Memorial Award (Top Academic High School Student)
- 2019–20 – Nico Daws, OHL Goaltender of the Year
- 2021–22 – Cameron Allen, Emms Family Award (Rookie of the Year)
- 2023–24 – Jett Luchanko, William Hanley Trophy (Most Sportsmanlike Player)
- 2025–26 – Mark Pape, Ivan Tennant Memorial Award (Top Academic High School Student)

=== NHL alumni ===
- Craig Anderson
- Jamie Arniel
- Eric Beaudoin
- Taylor Beck
- Chris Beckford-Tseu
- Ken Belanger
- Todd Bertuzzi
- Tyler Bertuzzi
- Braeden Bowman
- Dustin Brown
- Ryan Callahan
- Ben Chiarot
- Dan Cloutier
- Sylvain Cloutier
- Jeff Cowan
- Matt D'Agostini
- Kevin Dallman
- Nico Daws
- Jason Dickinson
- Drew Doughty
- Aaron Downey
- Sean Durzi
- MacKenzie Entwistle
- Robby Fabbri
- Daniel Girardi
- Chris Hajt
- Ben Harpur
- Dwayne Hay
- Cam Hillis
- Peter Holland
- Greg Jacina
- Cam Janssen
- Kevin Klein
- Scott Kosmachuk
- Michael Latta
- Jett Luchanko
- Manny Malhotra
- Kent McDonell
- Brock McGinn
- Brian McGrattan
- Ryan Merkley
- Zack Mitchell
- Rumun Ndur
- Jeff O'Neill
- Daniel Paille
- Richard Panik
- Ryan Parent
- Andrey Pedan
- Matthew Poitras
- Mike Prokopec
- Isaac Ratcliffe
- Tanner Richard
- Matt Ryan
- Kerby Rychel
- Dmitri Samorukov
- Givani Smith
- Garret Sparks
- Martin St. Pierre
- Charlie Stephens
- Alek Stojanov
- Pius Suter
- Nick Suzuki
- Daniel Taylor
- Alexey Toropchenko
- Fedor Tyutin
- Ryan VandenBussche
- Herbert Vasiljevs
- Brian Wesenberg
- Brian Willsie
- Jamie Wright

=== Honoured numbers ===
List of numbers retired/honoured by the Guelph Storm.

- 18 – Paul Fendley (retired)
- 24 – Ryan Callahan
- 32 – Dustin Brown
- 44 – Todd Bertuzzi
- 92 – Jeff O'Neill

=== Hall of Famers ===
No former Guelph Storm members are currently in the Hockey Hall of Fame.

== Season-by-season results ==
Regular season and playoffs results:

Legend: GP = Games played, W = Wins, L = Losses, T = Ties, OTL = Overtime losses, SL = Shoot-out losses, Pts = Points, GF = Goals for, GA = Goals against

Memorial Cup champions	OHL champions	OHL finalists

Season	Regular season											Playoffs
Season	GP	W	L	T	OTL	SOL	Pts	Pct	GF	GA	Finish	Playoffs
1991–92	66	4	51	11	—	—	19	0.144	235	425	8th Emms	Did not qualify
1992–93	66	27	33	6	—	—	60	0.455	298	360	7th Emms	Lost divisional quarterfinal (Detroit Junior Red Wings) 4–1
1993–94	66	32	28	6	—	—	70	0.530	323	290	3rd Emms	Won divisional quarterfinal (London Knights) 4–1; Lost divisional semifinal (Sault Ste. Marie Greyhounds) 4–0
1994–95	66	47	14	5	—	—	99	0.750	330	200	1st Central	Won quarterfinal (Owen Sound Platers) 4–0; Won semifinal (Belleville Bulls) 4–0; Lost OHL championship (Detroit Junior Red Wings) 4–2
1995–96	66	45	16	5	—	—	95	0.720	297	186	1st Central	Won quarterfinal (Niagara Falls Thunder) 4–0; Won semifinal (Belleville Bulls) 4–1; Lost OHL championship (Peterborough Petes) 4–3; 4th place at 1996 Memorial Cup
1996–97	66	35	25	6	—	—	76	0.576	300	251	2nd Central	Won division quarterfinal (Erie Otters) 4–1; Won quarterfinal (Sault Ste. Marie Greyhounds) 4–2; Lost semifinal (Ottawa 67's) 4–3
1997–98	66	42	18	6	—	—	90	0.682	263	189	1st Central	Won quarterfinal (Sudbury Wolves) 4–0; Won semifinal (Plymouth Whalers) 4–0; Won OHL championship (Ottawa 67's) 4–1; Lost 1998 Memorial Cup final (Portland Winterhawks) 4–3
1998–99	68	44	22	2	—	—	90	0.662	300	218	1st Midwest	Won conference quarterfinal (Erie Otters) 4–1; Lost conference semifinal (Owen Sound Platers) 4–2
1999–2000	68	29	34	4	1	—	63	0.456	250	256	4th Midwest	Lost conference quarterfinal (Plymouth Whalers) 4–2
2000–01	68	34	23	9	2	—	79	0.566	227	205	2nd Midwest	Lost conference quarterfinal (Brampton Battalion) 4–0
2001–02	68	41	22	4	1	—	87	0.596	246	218	2nd Midwest	Won conference quarterfinal (Kitchener Rangers) 4–0; Lost conference semifinal (Windsor Spitfires) 4–1; Lost 2002 Memorial Cup tie-breaker(Victoriaville Tigres) 4–3
2002–03	68	29	28	9	2	—	69	0.507	217	208	3rd Midwest	Won conference quarterfinal (Sarnia Sting) 4–2; Lost conference semifinal (Kitchener Rangers) 4–1
2003–04	68	49	14	5	0	—	103	0.757	276	182	2nd Midwest	Won conference quarterfinal (Owen Sound Attack) 4–3; Won conference semifinal (Plymouth Whalers) 4–0; Won conference final (London Knights) 4–3; Won OHL championship (Mississauga IceDogs) 4–0; 4th place at 2004 Memorial Cup
2004–05	68	23	34	10	1	—	57	0.412	167	189	5th Midwest	Lost conference quarterfinal (London Knights) 4–0
2005–06	68	40	24	—	1	3	84	0.618	232	206	3rd Midwest	Won conference quarterfinal (Saginaw Spirit) 4–0; Won conference semifinal (Plymouth Whalers) 4–2; Lost conference final (London Knights) 4–1
2006–07	68	33	23	—	3	9	78	0.574	215	200	3rd Midwest	Lost conference quarterfinal (Plymouth Whalers) 4–0
2007–08	68	34	25	—	5	4	77	0.566	213	187	3rd Midwest	Won conference quarterfinal (London Knights) 4–1; Lost conference semifinal (Sault Ste. Marie Greyhounds) 4–1
2008–09	68	35	26	—	4	3	77	0.566	226	209	2nd Midwest	Lost conference quarterfinal (Saginaw Spirit) 4–0
2009–10	68	35	29	—	3	1	74	0.544	242	255	3rd Midwest	Lost conference quarterfinal (London Knights) 4–1
2010–11	68	34	27	—	4	3	75	0.551	249	258	4th Midwest	Lost conference quarterfinal (Saginaw Spirit) 4–2
2011–12	68	31	31	—	2	4	68	0.500	234	238	4th Midwest	Lost conference quarterfinal (Plymouth Whalers) 4–2
2012–13	68	39	23	—	2	4	84	0.618	253	210	4th Midwest	Lost conference quarterfinal (Kitchener Rangers) 4–1
2013–14	68	52	12	—	2	2	108	0.794	340	191	1st Midwest	Won conference quarterfinal (Plymouth Whalers) 4–1; Won conference semifinal (London Knights) 4–1; Won conference final (Erie Otters) 4–1; Won OHL championship (North Bay Battalion) 4–1; Lost 2014 Memorial Cup final (Edmonton Oil Kings) 6–3
2014–15	68	38	26	—	2	2	80	0.588	237	237	3rd Midwest	Won conference quarterfinal (Owen Sound Attack) 4–1; Lost conference semifinal (Sault Ste. Marie Greyhounds) 4–0
2015–16	68	13	49	—	4	2	32	0.235	156	297	5th Midwest	Did not qualify
2016–17	68	21	40	—	5	2	49	0.360	202	297	5th Midwest	Did not qualify
2017–18	68	30	29	—	5	4	69	0.507	228	263	4th Midwest	Lost conference quarterfinal (Kitchener Rangers) 4–2
2018–19	68	40	18	—	6	4	90	0.662	308	230	2nd Midwest	Won conference quarterfinal (Kitchener Rangers) 4–0; Won conference semifinal (London Knights) 4–3; Won conference final (Saginaw Spirit) 4–3; Won OHL championship (Ottawa 67's) 4–2; Lost 2019 Memorial Cup semifinal (Rouyn-Noranda Huskies) 6–4
2019–20	63	32	23	—	3	5	72	0.571	218	209	3rd Midwest	Playoffs cancelled due to the COVID-19 pandemic
2020–21	Season cancelled due to the COVID-19 pandemic											
2021–22	68	36	24	—	5	3	80	0.588	251	228	2nd Midwest	Lost conference quarterfinal (Sault Ste. Marie Greyhounds) 4–1
2022–23	68	35	28	—	4	1	75	0.551	253	280	2nd Midwest	Lost conference quarterfinal (Sarnia Sting) 4–2
2023–24	68	33	28	—	6	1	73	0.537	210	225	4th Midwest	Lost conference quarterfinal (Sault Ste. Marie Greyhounds) 4–0
2024–25	68	21	38	—	5	4	51	0.375	226	301	5th Midwest	Did not qualify
2025–26	68	28	35	—	2	3	61	0.449	225	263	4th Midwest	Lost conference quarterfinal (Windsor Spitfires) 4–0

== Uniforms and logos ==
For the 2007/08 season, the team switched to a crimson and white colour scheme with the same logo that was on the last jerseys, except the "stripes" that appear across the "belly" of the Storm logo itself were modified from black to crimson. The white jersey has "STORM" written on top of the logo, and the crimson jersey has "GUELPH" above the logo. The new shoulder patches, featuring the alternate "GS" logo, have been redesigned and are meant to be read from the inside (the "G") outward (the "S").

The Guelph Storm primary logo is one of the team's mascots "Spyke" surrounded by a twister with the team name above it. The team colours are white, grey, crimson and black. Home jerseys have a white background with "STORM" above the logo, and away jerseys have a crimson background with "GUELPH" above the logo.

The previous Guelph Storm logo was used from 1991 to 1995. The team colours then were white, blue, grey and black. Home jerseys had a white background and away jerseys had a blue background.

== Arenas ==
The Guelph Storm played at the Guelph Memorial Gardens from 1991 until the year 2000 when moving to the new Guelph Sports and Entertainment Centre, since renamed the Sleeman Centre. The GSEC was built into what was a former Eaton's department store in a downtown shopping mall. The GSEC hosted the 2001 Hershey Cup and the 2002 Memorial Cup.

== See also ==
- List of ice hockey teams in Ontario
