= Ivan Tennant Memorial Award =

- Sport: Ice hockey
- Awarded for: Top academic high school player in OHL

History
- First award: 2005
- Most recent: Kaden Sienko

The Ivan Tennant Memorial Award is awarded annually to the top academic high school player in the Ontario Hockey League. It is named in honour of the late Ivan Tennant, a former education consultant for the Kitchener Rangers who worked to develop the academic standards for the entire league during twenty years of service. The award was first given out in 2005.

== Winners ==
List of recipients of the Ivan Tennant Memorial Award.

Season	Winner	Team
2004–05	Matt Pelech	Sarnia Sting
2005–06	Joe Pleckaitis	Ottawa 67's
2006–07	Andrew Shorkey	Owen Sound Attack
2007–08	Alex Friesen	Niagara IceDogs
2008–09	Freddie Hamilton	Niagara IceDogs
2009–10	Dougie Hamilton	Niagara IceDogs
2010–11	Andrew D'Agostini	Peterborough Petes
2011–12	Adam Pelech	Erie Otters
2012–13	Connor Burgess	Sudbury Wolves
2013–14	Adam Craievich	Guelph Storm
2014–15	Stephen Dhillon	Niagara IceDogs
2015–16	Kyle Keyser	Flint Firebirds
2016–17	Quinn Hanna	Guelph Storm
2017–18	Mack Guzda	Owen Sound Attack
2018–19	Mack Guzda	Owen Sound Attack
2018–19	Zack Terry	Guelph Storm
2019–20	Logan LeSage	Owen Sound Attack
2020–21	Lawson Sherk	Hamilton Bulldogs
2021–22	Cal Uens	Owen Sound Attack
2022–23	George Alboim	Erie Otters
2022–23	Ethay Hay	Flint Firebirds
2023–24	Carter George	Owen Sound Attack
2024–25	Kaden Sienko	Saginaw Spirit
2025–26	Mark Pape	Guelph Storm

== See also ==
- Bobby Smith Trophy (Top academic player combined with on-ice performance)
- Roger Neilson Memorial Award (Top academic college/university player)
- List of Canadian Hockey League awards
