= Owen Sound Attack =

Ontario Hockey League team in Owen Sound

- City: Owen Sound, Ontario
- League: Ontario Hockey League
- Conference: Western
- Division: Midwest
- Founded: 2000 (Attack); 1989 (Platers)
- Home arena: Harry Lumley Bayshore Community Centre
- Colours: Red, gold, black, and white
- General manager: Dale DeGray
- Head coach: Scott Wray
- Website: attackhockey.com

Franchise history
- 1968–1972: Guelph CMC's
- 1972–1975: Guelph Biltmore Madhatters
- 1975–1989: Guelph Platers
- 1989–2000: Owen Sound Platers
- 2000–present: Owen Sound Attack

Current uniform

The Owen Sound Attack are a junior ice hockey team in the Ontario Hockey League based in Owen Sound, Ontario, Canada. Based in Owen Sound since 1989, and operating under the current name since 2000, the Attack play their home games at the J. D. McArthur Arena inside the Harry Lumley Bayshore Community Centre.

== History ==
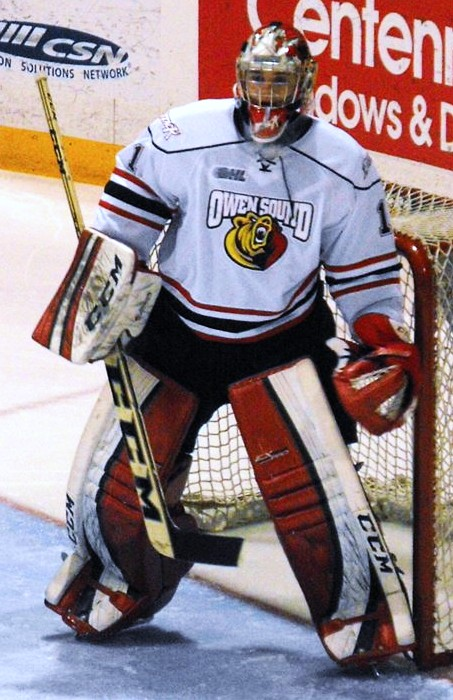
Jack Flinn (December 2013)

The Owen Sound OHL franchise was born when the Holody family moved the Guelph Platers to the city for the 1989–90 OHL season. The team kept the name of Owen Sound Platers.

The Owen Sound Attack were born in the late summer of the year 2000 as a community-based OHL franchise. When the Holody family decided to sell the Owen Sound Platers buyers were sought from any city.

Several local Owen Sound business people realized that an out-of-town buyer would mean losing the team to relocation. The most mentioned former OHL city was Cornwall, Ontario. This local business group banded together to purchase the team. After a bidding war and a summer-long legal battle with another suitor, the team remained in Owen Sound.

The ownership group elected for a name change and came up with the more modern sounding "Owen Sound Attack". The 2004–05 season was the best regular season in the OHL history of Owen Sound. General Manager Mike Futa was recognized by the OHL for his work in building the team with the OHL Executive of the Year award. The club also played host to the OHL All-Star Classic in 2005.

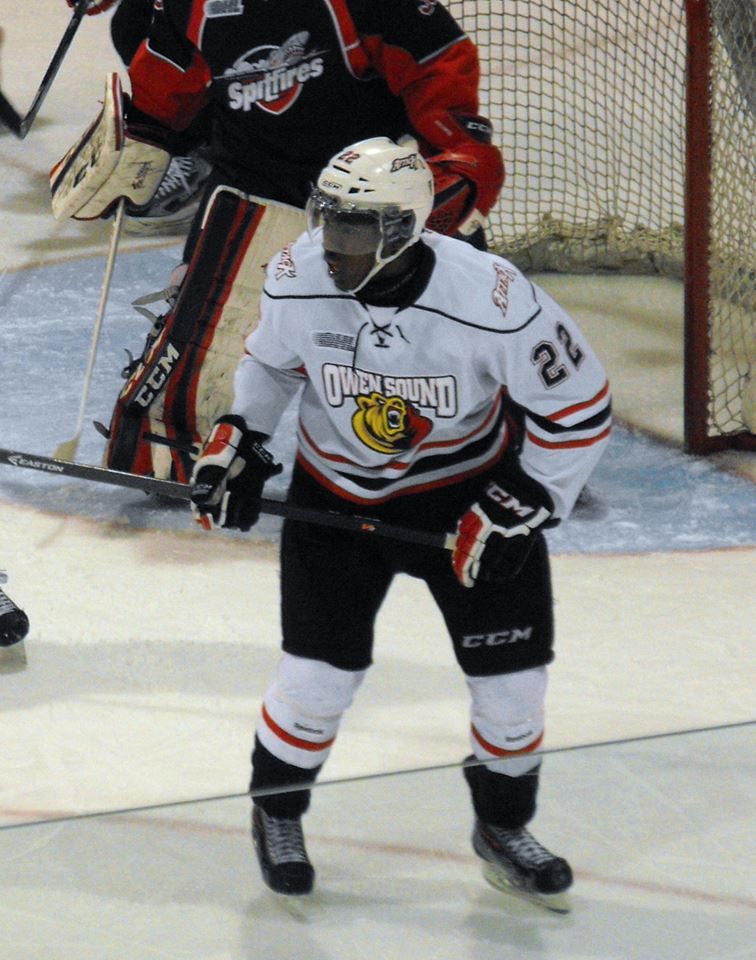
Jaden Lindo (December 2013)

In 2010–11, the Attack wore the jerseys of the 1951 Allan Cup Champion Owen Sound Mercurys as a throwback third jersey.

On April 27, 2011, the Owen Sound Attack earned their first OHL Conference Championship and their first berth in the Memorial Cup tournament since relocating from Guelph with a 10–4 win over the defending champion Windsor Spitfires and a result of the Memorial Cup host team, Mississauga St. Michael's Majors winning their conference series, 4–1 over the Niagara IceDogs.

On May 15, 2011, the Attack won their first J. Ross Robertson Cup as OHL Champions, also since relocating from Guelph with a 3–2 overtime win over the Mississauga St. Michael's Majors in the seventh game of the OHL finals.

The Attack set a new franchise attendance mark in 2011–12 of 97,619 fans and set a new record the following year, eclipsing the 100,000 mark in 2012–13 and again in 2013–14.

== Coaches ==
- 2000–2001, Brian O'Leary
- 2001–2002, Frank Carnevale
- 2002–2007, Mike Stothers
- 2007–2011, Mark Reeds
- 2011–2015, Greg Ireland
- 2015–2017, Ryan McGill
- 2017–2019, Todd Gill
- 2019–2021, Alan Letang
- 2021–2023, Greg Walters
- 2023–2024, Darren Rumble
- 2024–present, Scott Wray

== Players ==
=== Owen Sound Platers award winners ===
Andrew Brunette won the 1992–93 Eddie Powers Memorial Trophy as the top scorer in the OHL with 62 Goals, 100 Assists and 162 Points. He also tied for the Canadian Hockey League's scoring lead. Brunette was selected by the Washington Capitals 174th overall in the 7th round of 1993 NHL entry draft.

Jamie Storr was the 1993–94 OHL Goaltender of the Year. Storr was the starting goalie for back-to-back World Junior Hockey Championship Gold medals in 1993 and 1994. In the 1994 NHL entry draft he became what was then the highest-drafted goaltender overall in NHL history, by the Los Angeles Kings, 7th overall.

Dan Snyder, a former captain of the Owen Sound Platers, had his number 14 retired by the Owen Sound Attack in 2003. He is remembered in Owen Sound for his leadership on and off the ice. Snyder was twice voted his team's Humanitarian of the Year. Snyder died from injuries suffered in a vehicular accident in 2003 after just beginning his NHL career with the Atlanta Thrashers, and the Ontario Hockey League renamed its Humanitarian of the Year award posthumously in his honour.

=== Owen Sound Attack award winners ===
2004–05	Mike Futa	OHL Executive of the Year	
2005–06	Andrej Sekera	Max Kaminsky Trophy	OHL Most gentlemanly player
2005–06	Mike Angelidis	Dan Snyder Memorial Trophy	OHL Humanitarian of the year
2005–06	Mike Angelidis	CHL Humanitarian of the Year	
2006–07	Andrew Shorkey	Ivan Tennant Memorial Award	Top academic high school player
2010–11	Dale DeGray	OHL Executive of the Year	
2010–11	Rob Mignardi	Wayne Gretzky 99 Award	OHL Playoff MVP
2010–11	Mark Reeds	Matt Leyden Trophy	OHL Coach of the year
2012–13	Jordan Binnington & Brandon Hope	Dave Pinkney Trophy	OHL Team with lowest GAA
2012–13	Jordan Binnington	Jim Rutherford Trophy	OHL Goaltender of the year
2012–13	Ray McKelvie	Bill Long Award	Outstanding contribution and distinguished service to OHL
2014–15	Michael McNiven	F. W. "Dinty" Moore Trophy	OHL Rookie Goalie with best GAA
2016–17	Michael McNiven & Emanuel Vella	Dave Pinkney Trophy	OHL Team with lowest GAA
2016–17	Michael McNiven	Jim Rutherford Trophy	OHL Goaltender of the year
2016–17	Michael McNiven	CHL Goaltender of the Year	
2016–17	Ryan McGill	Matt Leyden Trophy	OHL Coach of the year
2016–17	Ryan McGill	Brian Kilrea Coach of the Year Award	CHL Coach of the year
2016–17	Nick Suzuki	William Hanley Trophy	OHL Most sportsmanlike player
2016–17	Nick Suzuki	CHL Sportsman of the Year	
2017–18	Nick Suzuki	William Hanley Trophy	OHL Most sportsmanlike player
2017–18	Mack Guzda	Ivan Tennant Memorial Award	Top academic high school player
2018–19	Mack Guzda	Ivan Tennant Memorial Award	Top academic high school player
2018–19	Nick Suzuki	William Hanley Trophy	OHL Most sportsmanlike player
2021–22	Cal Uens	Ivan Tennant Memorial Award	Top academic high school player
2021–22	Mark Woolley	Mickey Renaud Captain's Trophy	OHL Team Captain that Best Exemplifies Leadership
2021–22	Mark Woolley	Dan Snyder Memorial Trophy	OHL Humanitarian of the year
2021–22	Mark Woolley	CHL Humanitarian of the Year	
2022–23	Colby Barlow	Bobby Smith Trophy	OHL Scholastic player of the year
2022–23	Colby Barlow	CHL Scholastic Player of the Year	
2023–24	Carter George	Ivan Tennant Memorial Award	Top academic high school player
2023–24	Carter George	Bobby Smith Trophy	OHL Scholastic player of the year
2023–24	Carter George	CHL Scholastic Player of the Year	

=== NHL alumni ===
Alumni of the Owen Sound Attack who played in the National Hockey League (NHL).

- Mike Angelidis
- Josh Bailey
- Chris Bigras
- Jordan Binnington
- Paul Bissonnette
- Jesse Blacker
- Joseph Blandisi
- Daniel Catenacci
- Cody Ceci
- Andre Deveaux
- Sean Durzi
- Kurtis Gabriel
- Jonah Gadjovich
- Mark Giordano
- Mike Halmo
- Joey Hishon
- Greg Jacina
- Dan LaCosta
- Trevor Lewis
- Kurtis MacDermid
- Brian McGrattan
- Michael McNiven
- Jacob Middleton
- Chris Minard
- Phil Oreskovic
- Theo Peckham
- Brad Richardson
- Stefan Ruzicka
- Bobby Ryan
- Josh Samanski
- Bob Sanguinetti
- Andrej Sekera
- Andrew Shaw
- Wayne Simmonds
- Gemel Smith
- Maxim Sushko
- Nick Suzuki
- Garrett Wilson

== Season-by-season results ==
Regular season and playoffs results:

Legend: GP = Games played, W = Wins, L = Losses, T = Ties, OTL = Overtime losses, SL = Shoot-out losses, Pts = Points, GF = Goals for, GA = Goals against

Memorial Cup champions	OHL champions	OHL finalists

Season	Regular season											Playoffs
Season	GP	W	L	T	OTL	SOL	Pts	Pct	GF	GA	Finish	Playoffs
2000–01	68	31	27	7	3	—	72	0.507	256	236	4th Midwest	Lost conference quarterfinals (Windsor Spitfires) 4–1
2001–02	68	24	31	10	3	—	61	0.426	200	240	4th Midwest	Did not qualify
2002–03	68	27	30	7	4	—	65	0.449	206	243	4th Midwest	Lost conference quarterfinals (Plymouth Whalers) 4–0
2003–04	68	30	27	7	4	—	71	0.493	202	210	4th Midwest	Lost conference quarterfinals (Guelph Storm) 4–3
2004–05	68	40	18	7	3	—	90	0.640	245	187	2nd Midwest	Won conference quarterfinals (Plymouth Whalers) 4–0; Lost conference semifinals (Kitchener Rangers) 4–0
2005–06	68	32	29	v	4	3	71	0.522	239	239	4th Midwest	Won conference quarterfinals (Kitchener Rangers) 4–1; Lost conference semifinals (London Knights) 4–2
2006–07	68	31	30	—	3	4	69	0.507	256	261	4th Midwest	Lost conference quarterfinals (London Knights) 4–0
2007–08	68	20	41	—	2	5	47	0.346	200	290	4th Midwest	Did not qualify
2008–09	68	26	27	—	7	8	67	0.493	226	258	4th Midwest	Lost conference quarterfinals (Windsor Spitfires) 4–0
2009–10	68	27	33	—	4	4	62	0.456	221	276	5th Midwest	Did not qualify
2010–11	68	46	17	—	1	4	97	0.713	283	215	1st Midwest	Won conference quarterfinals (London Knights) 4–2; Won conference semifinals (Plymouth Whalers) 4–0; Won conference finals (Windsor Spitfires) 4–1; Won OHL championship (Mississauga Majors) 4–3; Lost 2011 Memorial Cup tie-breaker (Kootenay Ice) 7–3
2011–12	68	32	29	—	3	4	71	0.522	234	220	3rd Midwest	Lost conference quarterfinals (Kitchener Rangers) 4–1
2012–13	68	44	18	—	1	5	94	0.691	231	165	2nd Midwest	Won conference quarterfinals (Sault Ste. Marie Greyhounds) 4–2; Lost conference semifinals (Plymouth Whalers) 4–2
2013–14	68	31	29	—	3	5	70	0.515	205	237	4th Midwest	Lost conference quarterfinals (Sault Ste. Marie Greyhounds) 4–1
2014–15	68	35	24	—	2	7	79	0.589	240	211	4th Midwest	Lost conference quarterfinals (Guelph Storm) 4–1
2015–16	68	32	25	—	8	3	75	0.551	209	222	4th Midwest	Lost conference quarterfinals (London Knights) 4–2
2016–17	68	49	15	—	2	2	102	0.750	297	177	2nd Midwest	Won conference quarterfinals (Kitchener Rangers) 4–1; Won conference semifinals (Sault Ste. Marie Greyhounds) 4–2; Lost conference finals (Erie Otters) 4–2
2017–18	68	38	22	—	3	5	84	0.618	289	247	2nd Midwest	Won conference quarterfinals (London Knights) 4–0; Lost conference semifinals (Sault Ste. Marie Greyhounds) 4–3
2018–19	68	31	31	—	4	2	68	0.500	224	274	4th Midwest	Lost conference quarterfinals (Sault Ste. Marie Greyhounds) 4–1
2019–20	62	30	24	—	4	4	68	0.548	235	207	4th Midwest	Playoffs cancelled due to the COVID-19 pandemic
2020–21	Season cancelled due to the COVID-19 pandemic											
2021–22	68	34	26	—	5	3	76	0.559	235	245	3rd Midwest	Lost conference quarterfinals (Flint Firebirds) 4–3
2022–23	68	33	28	—	6	1	73	0.537	248	258	3rd Midwest	Lost conference quarterfinals (London Knights) 4–0
2023–24	68	29	30	—	6	3	67	0.493	246	274	5th Midwest	Lost conference quarterfinals (Saginaw Spirit) 4–0
2024–25	68	26	35	—	4	3	59	0.434	211	253	4th Midwest	Lost conference quarterfinals (London Knights) 4–0
2025–26	68	27	32	—	4	5	63	0.463	243	279	3rd Midwest	Lost conference quarterfinals (Flint Firebirds) 4–0

== Uniforms and logos ==
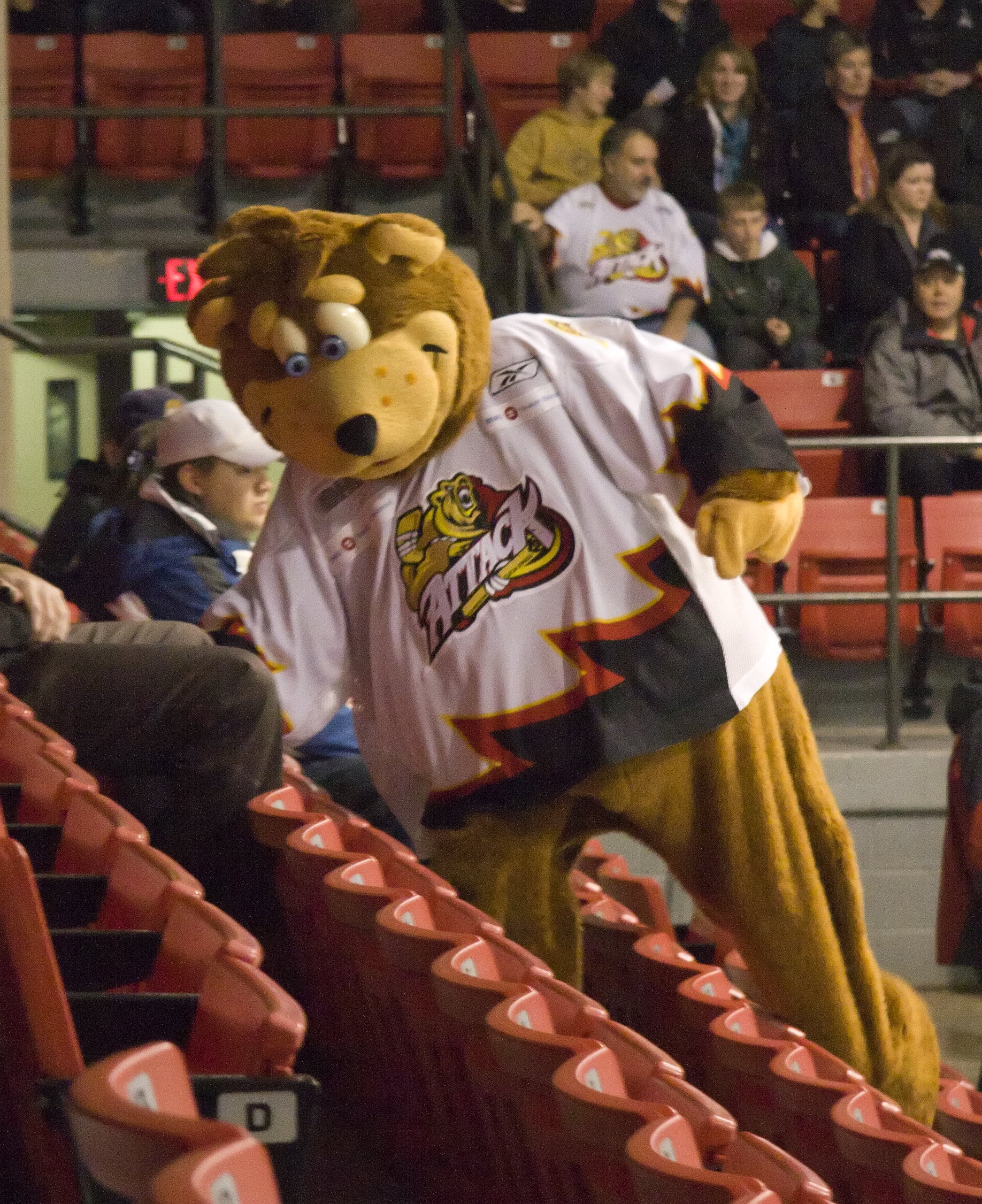
Attack mascot Cubby with jersey depicting the first Attack Logo

2010–11 Third Jersey logo.

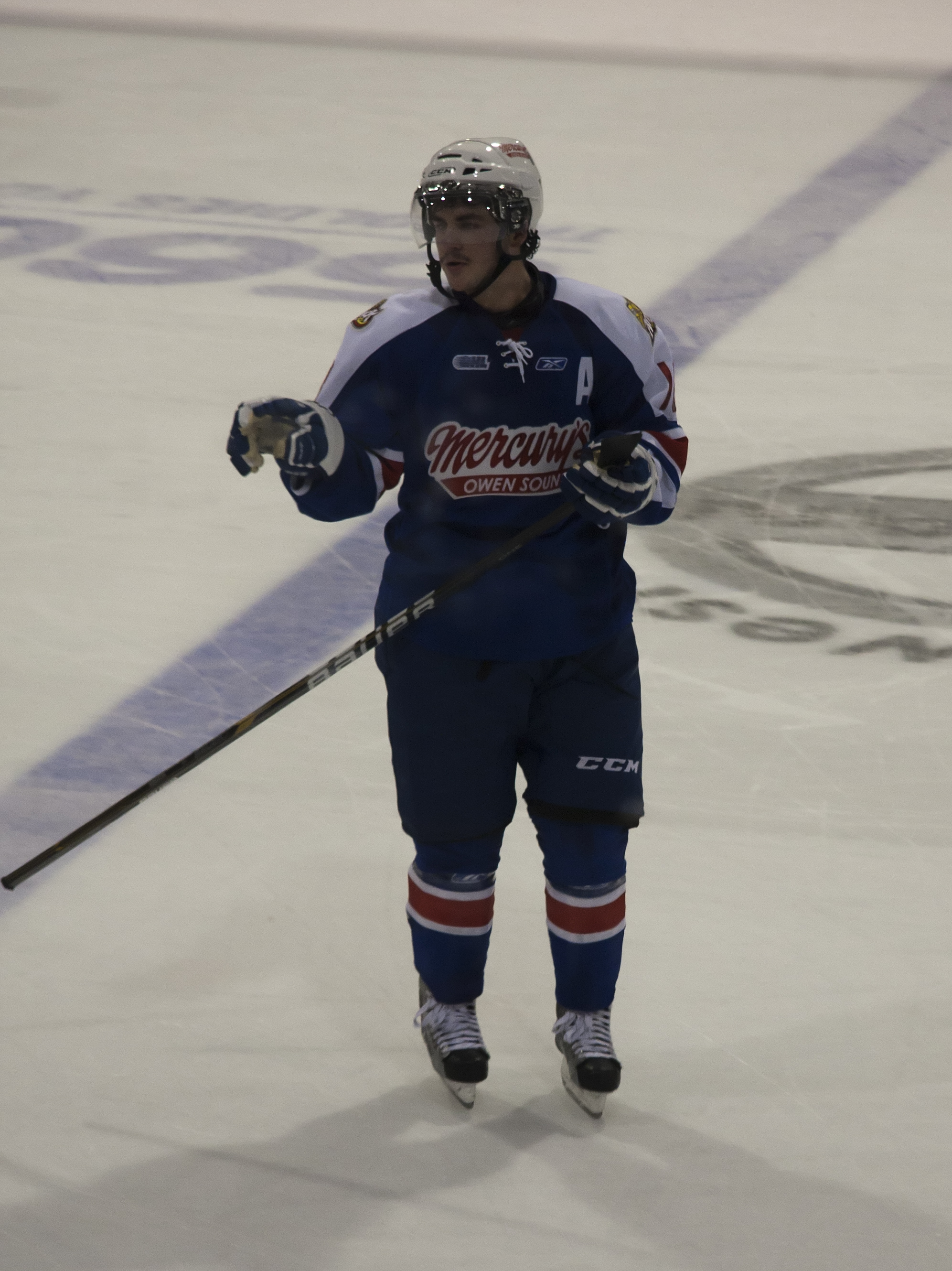
Joey Hishon wearing the third jersey

The Owen Sound Attack's Home and Away uniforms are:

Red with Black and White; White with Black and Red

Third Jerseys are: Black with Red and White

Team Mascot: Cubby

2010–11 Third jersey: Blue, red, and white with Owen Sound Mercurys logo

2023–24 Alternate jersey: Black, white, and orange with Owen Sound Greys logo honouring 100th anniversary of the 1924 Memorial Cup Champions

== Arena ==
The Harry Lumley Bayshore Community Centre received extensive renovations beginning in 2001, to include private boxes. The arena hosted the 2005 OHL All-Star Classic. A new video scoreboard was added in 2015.

== See also ==
- List of ice hockey teams in Ontario
