= CHL Goaltender of the Year =

Annual award to a Canadian Hockey League player

CHL Goaltender of the Year Award
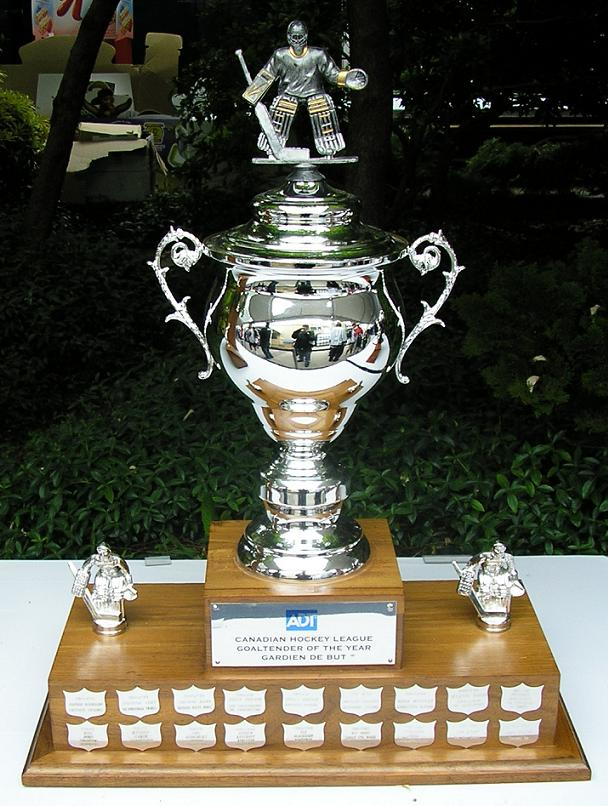
- Sport: Ice hockey
- Awarded for: Annually to the top goaltender in the Canadian Hockey League

History
- First award: 1988
- First winner: Stéphane Beauregard
- Most wins: Carter Hart (2)
- Most recent: Ryder Fetterolf

The CHL Goaltender of the Year Award is given out annually to the top goaltender in the Canadian Hockey League. It is chosen from the winners of the goaltending awards from the CHL's three constituent leagues: the Jim Rutherford Trophy (OHL), the Del Wilson Trophy (WHL), and the Patrick Roy Trophy (QMJHL).

== Winners ==
List of winners of the CHL Goaltender of the Year Award.

Season	Winner	Team	League
1987–88	Stephane Beauregard	Saint-Jean Lynx	QMJHL
1988–89	Stephane Fiset	Victoriaville Tigres	QMJHL
1989–90	Trevor Kidd	Brandon Wheat Kings	WHL
1990–91	Felix Potvin	Chicoutimi Saguenéens	QMJHL
1991–92	Corey Hirsch	Kamloops Blazers	WHL
1992–93	Jocelyn Thibault	Sherbrooke Faucons	QMJHL
1993–94	Norm Maracle	Saskatoon Blades	WHL
1994–95	Martin Biron	Beauport Harfangs	QMJHL
1995–96	Frederic Deschenes	Granby Prédateurs	QMJHL
1996–97	Marc Denis	Chicoutimi Saguenéens	QMJHL
1997–98	Mathieu Garon	Victoriaville Tigres	QMJHL
1998–99	Cody Rudkowsky	Seattle Thunderbirds	WHL
1999–2000	Andrew Raycroft	Kingston Frontenacs	OHL
2000–01	Dan Blackburn	Kootenay Ice	WHL
2001–02	Ray Emery	Sault Ste. Marie Greyhounds	OHL
2002–03	Adam Russo	Acadie–Bathurst Titan	QMJHL
2003–04	Cam Ward	Red Deer Rebels	WHL
2004–05	Jeff Glass	Kootenay Ice	WHL
2005–06	Justin Pogge	Calgary Hitmen	WHL
2006–07	Carey Price	Tri-City Americans	WHL
2007–08	Chet Pickard	Tri-City Americans	WHL
2008–09	Mike Murphy	Belleville Bulls	OHL
2009–10	Jake Allen	Drummondville Voltigeurs	QMJHL
2010–11	Darcy Kuemper	Red Deer Rebels	WHL
2011–12	Michael Houser	London Knights	OHL
2012–13	Patrik Bartosak	Red Deer Rebels	WHL
2013–14	Jordon Cooke	Kelowna Rockets	WHL
2014–15	Philippe Desrosiers	Rimouski Océanic	QMJHL
2015–16	Carter Hart	Everett Silvertips	WHL
2016–17	Michael McNiven	Owen Sound Attack	OHL
2017–18	Carter Hart	Everett Silvertips	WHL
2018–19	Ian Scott	Prince Albert Raiders	WHL
2019–20	Dustin Wolf	Everett Silvertips	WHL
2020–21	Not awarded due to COVID-19 pandemic		
2021–22	Dylan Garand	Kamloops Blazers	WHL
2022–23	Nathan Darveau	Victoriaville Tigres	QMJHL
2023–24	William Rousseau	Rouyn-Noranda Huskies	QMJHL
2024–25	Jackson Parsons	Kitchener Rangers	OHL
2025–26	Ryder Fetterolf	Ottawa 67's	OHL

== See also ==
- List of Canadian Hockey League awards
