= Greg Jacina =

Canadian ice hockey player (born 1982)

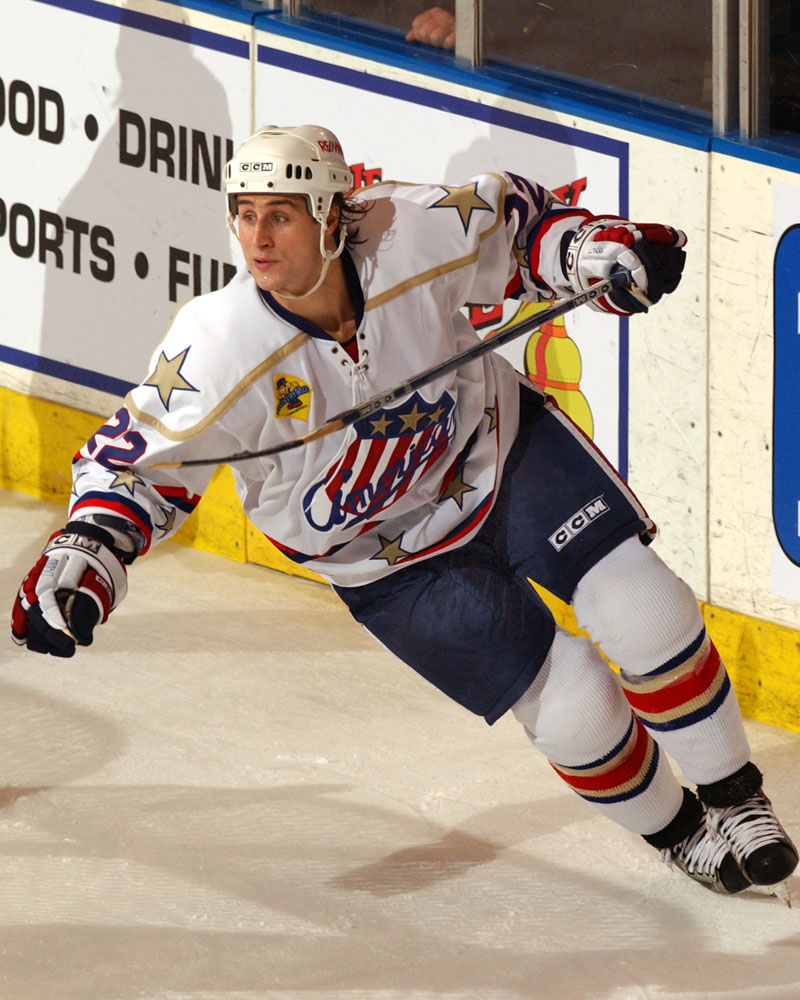
- Jacina with the Rochester Americans in 2005
- Born: May 22, 1982 (age 44) Guelph, Ontario, Canada
- Height: 6 ft 0 in (183 cm)
- Weight: 203 lb (92 kg; 14 st 7 lb)
- Position: Right wing
- Shot: Right
- EIHL team Former teams: Nottingham Panthers; Florida Panthers; Lukko Rauma; Tappara; VIK Västerås HK; SV Renon; Odense Bulldogs; Frederikshavn White Hawks; Rosenborg IHK
- NHL draft: Undrafted
- Playing career: 2003–2015

Greg Jacina (born May 22, 1982) is a Canadian former professional ice hockey Winger. He played 14 games in the National Hockey League with the Florida Panthers during the 2005–06 and 2006–07 seasons, though most of his career, which lasted from 2003 to 2015, was spent in the minor leagues and then in Europe.

== Biography ==
Jacina was born in Guelph, Ontario. As a youth, he played in the 1996 Quebec International Pee-Wee Hockey Tournament with a minor ice hockey team from North York. He played major junior hockey in the Ontario Hockey League, before signing as an undrafted free agent to an entry-level contract with the Florida Panthers on August 12, 2003. In the Panthers organization, Jacina made his NHL debut and played in the 2005–06 and 2006–07 seasons in the NHL.

He signed for Lukko Rauma of the SM-liiga in Finland, for the 2007–08 season but due to injury he could not complete on game that season. He started the following 2008–09 season in Lukko before after 16 games he switched to Tappara. After 10 games in Tampere, Jacina continued his journeyman campaign in moving to VIK Västerås HK of the HockeyAllsvenskan.

On May 8, 2014, Jacina agree to a one-year contract extension to remain in Nottingham of the EIHL.

== Career statistics ==
=== Regular season and playoffs ===
			Regular season					Playoffs
Season	Team	League	GP	G	A	Pts	PIM	GP	G	A	Pts	PIM
1998–99	Orangeville Crushers	MWJHL	25	13	12	25	33	—	—	—	—	—
1998–99	Guelph Storm	OHL	6	1	0	1	0	—	—	—	—	—
1999–00	Owen Sound Platers	OHL	66	12	29	41	62	—	—	—	—	—
2000–01	Owen Sound Attack	OHL	57	25	26	51	101	4	0	1	1	15
2001–02	Owen Sound Attack	OHL	33	15	20	35	64	—	—	—	—	—
2001–02	Mississauga IceDogs	OHL	28	14	26	40	43	—	—	—	—	—
2002–03	Mississauga IceDogs	OHL	56	19	47	66	104	5	6	5	11	4
2003–04	San Antonio Rampage	AHL	13	0	4	4	22	—	—	—	—	—
2003–04	Augusta Lynx	ECHL	58	15	23	38	170	—	—	—	—	—
2004–05	San Antonio Rampage	AHL	78	11	20	31	150	—	—	—	—	—
2005–06	Florida Panthers	NHL	11	0	1	1	4	—	—	—	—	—
2005–06	Rochester Americans	AHL	35	7	4	11	152	—	—	—	—	—
2006–07	Florida Panthers	NHL	3	0	0	0	2	—	—	—	—	—
2006–07	Rochester Americans	AHL	61	15	20	35	96	3	0	1	1	4
2008–09	Lukko	FIN	16	2	4	6	20	—	—	—	—	—
2008–09	Tappara	FIN	10	1	0	1	39	—	—	—	—	—
2008–09	Västerås IK	SWE-2	14	3	3	6	39	—	—	—	—	—
2009–10	Ritten/Renon	ITA	37	17	29	46	82	15	5	9	14	36
2010–11	Odense Bulldogs	DEN	38	13	29	42	118	—	—	—	—	—
2011–12	Frederikshavn White Hawks	DEN	40	15	24	39	78	4	2	2	4	10
2012–13	Ritten/Renon	ITA	41	16	27	43	91	7	2	0	2	4
2013–14	Rosenborg IHK	NOR	28	8	15	23	130	—	—	—	—	—
2013–14	Nottingham Panthers	EIHL	23	4	10	14	32	2	0	0	0	0
2014–15	Nottingham Panthers	EIHL	47	13	17	30	107	2	0	0	0	4
AHL totals			187	33	48	81	420	3	0	1	1	4
NHL totals			14	0	1	1	6	—	—	—	—	—
