= Roger Neilson Memorial Award =

- Sport: Ice hockey
- Awarded for: Top academic post-secondary school player in OHL

History
- First award: 2005
- Most recent: Brad Gardiner

The Roger Neilson Memorial Award is awarded annually to the top academic post-secondary school (college or university) player in the Ontario Hockey League. The award is named in honour of Hockey Hall of Fame coach Roger Neilson, a former high school teacher, and former coach of the Peterborough Petes.

== Winners ==
List of recipients of the Roger Neilson Memorial Award.

Season	Winner	Team
2004–05	Danny Battochio	Ottawa 67's
2005–06	Danny Battochio	Ottawa 67's
2006–07	Derrick Bagshaw	Erie Otters
2007–08	Scott Aarssen	London Knights
2008–09	Tim Priamo	Guelph Storm
2009-10	Derek Lanoue	Windsor Spitfires
2010-11	Derek Lanoue	Windsor Spitfires
2011–12	Kyle Pereira	Guelph Storm
2012–13	Daniel Altshuller	Oshawa Generals
2013–14	Patrick Watling	Sault Ste. Marie Greyhounds
2014–15	Justin Nichols	Guelph Storm
2015–16	Damian Bourne	Mississauga Steelheads
2016–17	Stephen Gibson	Mississauga Steelheads
2017–18	Stephen Gibson	Mississauga Steelheads
2018–19	Sasha Chmelevski	Ottawa 67's
2019–20	Jacob Golden	Erie Otters
2020–21	Adam Varga	Ottawa 67's
2021–22	Adam Varga	Ottawa 67's
2022–23	Ryder McIntyre	Oshawa Generals
2023–24	Thomas Sirman	Ottawa 67's
2024–25	Thomas Budnick	Brantford Bulldogs
2025–26	Brad Gardiner	Barrie Colts

== See also ==
- Bobby Smith Trophy (Top academic player combined with on-ice performance)
- Ivan Tennant Memorial Award (Top academic high school player)
- List of Canadian Hockey League awards
