= Andrew Raycroft =

Canadian ice hockey player (born 1980)

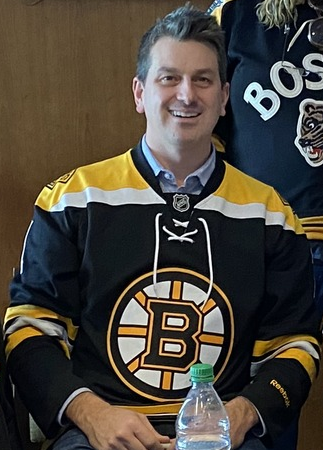
- Raycroft in January 2023
- Born: May 4, 1980 (age 46) Belleville, Ontario, Canada
- Height: 6 ft 0 in (183 cm)
- Weight: 185 lb (84 kg; 13 st 3 lb)
- Position: Goaltender
- Caught: Left
- Played for: Boston Bruins; Toronto Maple Leafs; Colorado Avalanche; Vancouver Canucks; Dallas Stars; Hockey Milano Rossoblu
- NHL draft: 135th overall, 1998; Boston Bruins
- Playing career: 2000–2014

Andrew Joseph Ernest Raycroft (born May 4, 1980) is a Canadian professional ice hockey analyst and former player. Originally drafted by the Boston Bruins of the National Hockey League (NHL) 135th overall in 1998, he won the Calder Memorial Trophy with the club in 2004 as rookie of the year. Raycroft has also played for the Toronto Maple Leafs, Colorado Avalanche, Vancouver Canucks, Dallas Stars, Hockey Milano Rossoblu and IF Björklöven.

Since 2014, he has been a volunteer assistant coach for the University of Connecticut's men's hockey team. Raycroft is currently a rinkside and studio analyst for the Boston Bruins broadcasts on NESN, and a host on the hockey podcasts Morning Bru with Jaffe & Razor and Clearing the Crease.

== Playing career ==
=== Early years/Boston Bruins ===
Prior to entering the junior hockey ranks, Raycroft grew up playing minor hockey with the Quinte Red Devils AAA system in the Eastern Ontario AAA League of the Ontario Minor Hockey Association (OMHA). In 1997–98, he began a three-year career in the Ontario Hockey League (OHL), playing for the Kingston Frontenacs and Sudbury Wolves. He also played junior for the Wellington Dukes of the Ontario Provincial Junior A Hockey League (OPJAHL).

Raycroft was drafted 135th overall by the Boston Bruins in the 1998 NHL entry draft. He made his NHL debut in 2000–01 with the Bruins, replacing Byron Dafoe in a 5–1 victory over the Philadelphia Flyers. However, as a late-game replacement, he was not given the decision. Raycroft recorded his first NHL win two days later on October 9 in a 4–2 win over the Florida Panthers. Raycroft played 11 games total for the Bruins in his first season, while playing the majority of his first three professional seasons with the team's minor league affiliate, the Providence Bruins of the American Hockey League (AHL).

After the Bruins renewed his contract on July 31, 2003, Raycroft played his first full NHL season in 2003–04, compiling a 29–18–9 record with a 2.05 goals against average (GAA), .926 save percentage and three shutouts. He helped lead the Bruins to a second-place finish in the regular season in the Eastern Conference en route to the 2004 Stanley Cup playoffs. Not having played enough games to qualify as a rookie in his previous three NHL seasons, Raycroft was awarded the Calder Memorial Trophy in 2004 as league rookie of the year.

Due to the 2004–05 NHL lockout, Raycroft signed with Djurgårdens IF of the Swedish Elitserien on November 6, 2004. However, he did not play any games for the team and signed with Tappara Tampere of the Finnish SM-liiga several months later on January 17, 2005. When NHL play resumed, he struggled with the Bruins in the 2005–06 season, managing only eight wins while being a healthy scratch for the majority of the season. He was demoted to the Bruins' third-string position behind starter Tim Thomas and rookie backup Hannu Toivonen.

=== Toronto Maple Leafs ===
Raycroft with Toronto 2008

The following off-season, on June 24, 2006, Raycroft was traded to the Toronto Maple Leafs in exchange for the rights to Finnish goaltending prospect Tuukka Rask. It was later revealed the Bruins intended to release him, which would have made him available to Toronto without any compensation at all. He began playing for the Maple Leafs in the 2006–07 season and earned his first shutout and win as a Leaf in a 6-0 victory against the Ottawa Senators on October 5, 2006. On April 3, 2007, Raycroft tied the Leafs' franchise record for most wins by a goaltender in the regular season (37), previously held by Ed Belfour in 2002–03 (Raycroft played more games than Belfour and earned three shootout wins, which did not exist prior to the 2005–06 season). Despite this record, he finished 49th in GAA and 56th in save percentage as the Leafs failed to qualify for the playoffs.

Raycroft struggled at the start of the 2007–08 season and surrendered the starting position to Vesa Toskala. The Leafs then placed him on waivers on June 24, 2008, and bought out the remainder of his contract on June 27.

=== Colorado Avalanche ===
Raycroft making a save with Colorado

Several days after being bought out by the Maple Leafs, on July 1, he signed a one-year deal with the Colorado Avalanche. Despite being brought in to back-up Peter Budaj, Raycroft started the 2008–09 season strong, becoming only the second Avalanche goaltender to begin a season with a 9–1 record. In 31 games with the Avalanche, Raycroft posted a 12-16-0 record with a 3.14 GAA.

=== Vancouver Canucks ===
On July 6, 2009, Raycroft signed a one-year contract with the Vancouver Canucks. He earned the backup position behind Roberto Luongo after competing with prospect Cory Schneider during training camp. He recorded his first win with the Canucks in his first start on October 29 in a 2–1 shootout win against the Los Angeles Kings after Luongo was sidelined with a fractured rib. Raycroft faced his former Avalanche teammates several days later on November 1 and recorded his first shutout as a Canuck in a 3–0 win. Raycroft won his 100th NHL career game on February 12, 2010, in a 4–3 win over the Columbus Blue Jackets.

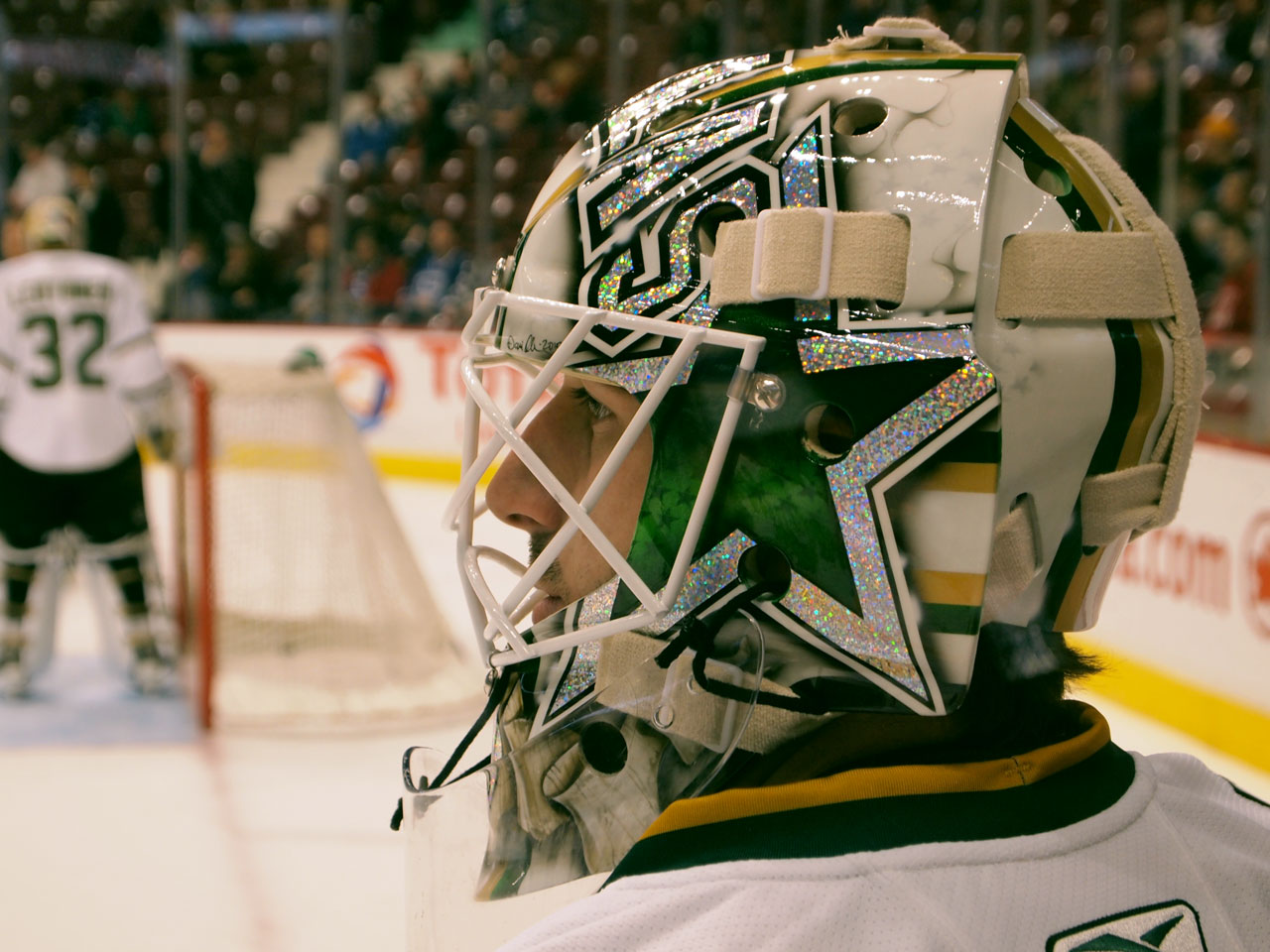
Raycroft debuts his new goalie mask against the Vancouver Canucks.

=== Dallas Stars ===
On July 1, 2010, Raycroft signed a two-year contract as a free agent with the Dallas Stars. He compiled an 8–5 record with a 2.83 GAA in his first season in Dallas, backing-up Stars starter Kari Lehtonen.

On December 29, 2011, Raycroft was assigned to the Texas Stars, the Dallas Stars' AHL affiliate. He played in the minors for the remainder of his contract going 9-10-1 in 21 games with a 3.16 GAA.

=== Europe ===
On July 3, 2012, with an impending lockout on the horizon, Raycroft left North America to sign to a one-year deal with Italian Serie A club, Milano Rossoblu. In 42 starts Raycroft went 20-22 with a career best 9.18 save percentage and a 2.69 GAA. Milano Rossoblu lost in the first round of the playoffs 4-2.

On July 15, 2013, Raycroft joined IF Björklöven in the Swedish minor leagues for the 2013–14 season. In 41 games Raycroft went 16-24 with a 2.88 GAA.

== Post retirement ==
=== Coaching ===
On April 9, 2014, Raycroft announced his retirement from professional hockey. That same year Raycroft served as an assistant coach at Lincoln-Sudbury High School alongside former teammate Hal Gill. He later joined the Connecticut Huskies men's ice hockey as a volunteer assistant coach working with the team’s goalies, a position he held until 2017. He also served as a director Stop It Goaltending for the Bridge Program.

Raycroft also plays in Bruins alumni charity games and is involved with local youth hockey programs.

=== Broadcasting ===
Following his coaching career, Raycroft became active in media, including stints with ESPN where he works as one of their leading experts and in studio analyst on pro and college hockey. In 2017, he began working for the New England Sports Network where he has covered college hockey and the Boston Bruins respectively. Since 2021, Raycroft has hosted a Bruins podcast with fellow NESN employee Billy Jaffe entitled Morning Bru with Jaffe & Razor. He currently works as a Studio and Rink Side Analyst for Bruins games.

During the 2024-25 season, Raycroft alongside Tuukka Rask and Patrice Bergeron started Unobstructed Views a Bruins themed alternate live telecast series which airs on the New England Sports Network. In 2025 Raycroft won a Regional Emmy Award for Outstanding Sports Interview/Discussion.

== Personal life ==
Raycroft is married to his wife Erin; they have three children together. Their son Mason, who is also a goaltender, was drafted by the Kingston Frontenacs of the major junior Ontario Hockey League in 2025.

== Career statistics ==
=== Regular season and playoffs ===
			Regular season										Playoffs
Season	Team	League	GP	W	L	T	OTL	MIN	GA	SO	GAA	SV%	GP	W	L	MIN	GA	SO	GAA	SV%
1996–97	Wellington Dukes	MetJHL	27	—	—	—	—	1402	92	—	3.94	—	—	—	—	—	—	—	—	—
1997–98	Sudbury Wolves	OHL	33	8	16	5	—	1802	125	0	4.16	.901	2	0	1	89	8	0	5.39	.855
1998–99	Sudbury Wolves	OHL	45	17	22	5	—	2528	173	1	4.11	.906	3	0	2	96	13	0	8.12	.841
1999–00	Kingston Frontenacs	OHL	61	33	20	5	—	3340	191	0	3.43	.924	5	1	4	300	21	0	4.20	.906
2000–01	Providence Bruins	AHL	26	8	14	4	—	1459	82	1	3.37	.891	—	—	—	—	—	—	—	—
2000–01	Boston Bruins	NHL	15	4	6	0	—	649	32	0	2.96	.890	—	—	—	—	—	—	—	—
2001–02	Providence Bruins	AHL	56	25	24	6	—	3317	142	7	2.57	.916	2	0	2	119	5	0	2.52	.904
2001–02	Boston Bruins	NHL	1	0	0	1	—	65	3	0	2.77	.897	—	—	—	—	—	—	—	—
2002–03	Providence Bruins	AHL	39	23	10	3	—	2255	94	1	2.50	.917	4	1	3	264	6	1	1.36	.955
2002–03	Boston Bruins	NHL	5	2	3	0	—	300	12	0	2.40	.918	—	—	—	—	—	—	—	—
2003–04	Boston Bruins	NHL	57	29	18	9	—	3420	117	3	2.05	.926	7	3	4	447	16	1	2.15	.924
2004–05	Tappara	SM-l	11	4	5	2	—	657	32	1	2.92	.912	3	0	2	104	11	0	6.34	.847
2005–06	Providence Bruins	AHL	1	1	0	—	0	64	3	0	2.81	.870	—	—	—	—	—	—	—	—
2005–06	Boston Bruins	NHL	30	8	19	—	2	1619	100	0	3.70	.879	—	—	—	—	—	—	—	—
2006–07	Toronto Maple Leafs	NHL	72	37	25	—	9	4108	205	2	2.99	.894	—	—	—	—	—	—	—	—
2007–08	Toronto Maple Leafs	NHL	19	2	9	—	5	964	63	1	3.92	.876	—	—	—	—	—	—	—	—
2008–09	Colorado Avalanche	NHL	31	12	16	—	0	1722	90	0	3.14	.892	—	—	—	—	—	—	—	—
2009–10	Vancouver Canucks	NHL	21	9	5	—	1	967	39	1	2.42	.911	1	0	0	25	1	0	2.40	.857
2010–11	Dallas Stars	NHL	19	8	5	—	0	847	40	2	2.83	.910	—	—	—	—	—	—	—	—
2011–12	Dallas Stars	NHL	10	2	8	—	0	529	31	0	3.52	.898	—	—	—	—	—	—	—	—
2011–12	Texas Stars	AHL	21	9	10	—	1	1157	61	0	3.16	.891	—	—	—	—	—	—	—	—
2012–13	Milano Rossoblu	ITA	42	20	22	—	0	2542	114	5	2.69	.918	6	2	4	296	18	0	3.66	.915
2013–14	IF Björklöven	SWE-2	41	16	24	—	0	2335	112	3	2.88	.896	10	6	4	610	22	1	2.16	.909
NHL totals			280	113	114	10	17	15192	732	9	2.89	.900	8	3	4	472	17	1	2.16	.922

== Awards ==
OHL

- Named to the First All-Star Team in 1999–2000.
- Named the OHL Goaltender of the Year in 1999–2000.
- Won the Red Tilson Trophy in 1999–2000.

CHL

- Named to the First All-Star Team in 1999–2000.
- Named CHL Goaltender of the Year in 1999–2000.

NHL

- Played in the NHL YoungStars Game in 2003–04.
- Won the Calder Memorial Trophy in 2003–04.
- Named to the NHL All-Rookie Team in 2003–04.

Boston Bruins

- Seventh Player Award in 2003-04
- Three Stars Award in 2003-04

Awards and achievements
Preceded by Barret Jackman	Winner of the Calder Memorial Trophy; 2004	Succeeded by Alexander Ovechkin
