= List of Canadian Hockey League awards =

The Canadian Hockey League awards sixteen annual trophies for accomplishments during the regular and at the Memorial Cup to top individuals and teams among its three member leagues. The Memorial Cup is the top award for the championship team at the end-of-season Memorial Cup tournament. A set of five individual awards are given for performance at the tournament. In the regular season, Canadian Hockey League also presents ten annual awards. The nominees for each individual award are determined by the winner of the corresponding award handed out by each of the Canadian Hockey League's three member leagues, the Ontario Hockey League, the Quebec Maritimes Junior Hockey League, and the Western Hockey League.

Each award, and its OHL, QMJHL and WHL equivalent, are listed here.

== Canadian Hockey league awards ==
List of individual awards presented by the Canadian Hockey league.

CHL Player of the Year
Awarded to the individual judged to be the most outstanding player in the CHL
OHL: Red Tilson Trophy	QMJHL: Michel Brière Memorial Trophy	WHL: Four Broncos Memorial Trophy

CHL Rookie of the Year
Awarded to the top rookie in the CHL
OHL: Emms Family Award	QMJHL: Sidney Crosby Trophy	WHL: Jim Piggott Memorial Trophy

CHL Goaltender of the Year
Awarded to the top goaltender in the CHL
OHL: Jim Rutherford Trophy	QMJHL: Jacques Plante Memorial Trophy	WHL: Del Wilson Trophy

CHL Defenceman of the Year
Awarded to the top defenceman in the CHL
OHL: Max Kaminsky Trophy	QMJHL: Emile Bouchard Trophy	WHL: Bill Hunter Memorial Trophy

CHL Top Scorer Award
First awarded in 1994, the Top Scorer award is given to the player with the most points in the CHL
OHL: Eddie Powers Memorial Trophy	QMJHL: Jean Béliveau Trophy	WHL: Bob Clarke Trophy

Brian Kilrea Coach of the Year Award
Awarded to the CHL's Coach of the Year
OHL: Matt Leyden Trophy	QMJHL: Ron Lapointe Trophy	WHL: Dunc McCallum Memorial Trophy

CHL Scholastic Player of the Year
Awarded to the player best able to combine on-ice performance with scholastic success
OHL: Bobby Smith Trophy	QMJHL: Marcel Robert Trophy	WHL: Daryl K. (Doc) Seaman Trophy

CHL Humanitarian of the Year
Awarded to the player judged to have made the most notable contributions to his community
OHL: Dan Snyder Memorial Trophy	QMJHL: QMJHL Humanitarian of the Year	WHL: Doug Wickenheiser Memorial Trophy

CHL Sportsman of the Year
Awarded to the player judged to have been the most sportsmanlike player in the CHL
OHL: William Hanley Trophy	QMJHL: David Desharnais Trophy	WHL: Brad Hornung Trophy

CHL Top Draft Prospect Award
Awarded to the top eligible Canadian Hockey League prospect for the NHL Entry Draft
OHL: no equivalent award	QMJHL: Michael Bossy Trophy	WHL: no equivalent award

CHL Executive of the Year
Awarded to the outstanding executive in the CHL (last awarded in 2002)
OHL: OHL Executive of the Year	QMJHL: John Horman Trophy	WHL: Lloyd Saunders Memorial Trophy

== Memorial Cup awards ==
List of awards presented at the Memorial Cup.

Memorial Cup	Awarded to the Canadian Hockey League champion
Stafford Smythe Memorial Trophy	Awarded to the Most Valuable Player of the Memorial Cup
Ed Chynoweth Trophy	Awarded to the top scorer of the Memorial Cup
Hap Emms Memorial Trophy	Awarded to the outstanding goaltender of the Memorial Cup
George Parsons Trophy	Awarded to the most sportsmanlike player of the Memorial Cup
Memorial Cup All-Star Team	Awarded to the best player at each position of the Memorial Cup

== Member league awards ==
The CHL's three member leagues also hand out several awards that do not have a CHL equivalent.

=== Ontario Hockey League ===
J. Ross Robertson Cup	Ontario Hockey League champion
Bobby Orr Trophy	Eastern Conference playoff champion
Wayne Gretzky Trophy	Western Conference playoff champion
Hamilton Spectator Trophy	Regular season champion
Leyden Trophy	East Division champion
Emms Trophy	Central Division champion
Holody Trophy	Midwest Division champion
Bumbacco Trophy	West Division champion
Wayne Gretzky 99 Award	Playoff MVP
Dave Pinkney Trophy	Lowest team goals against average
Bill Long Award	Lifetime distinguished service
Jim Mahon Memorial Trophy	Top scoring right-winger
Jack Ferguson Award	First overall priority draft selection
F.W. "Dinty" Moore Trophy	Lowest rookie goals against average
Leo Lalonde Memorial Trophy	Overage player of the year
Roger Neilson Memorial Award	Top academic college/university player
Ivan Tennant Memorial Award	Top academic high school player
Mickey Renaud Captain's Trophy	OHL team captain award
Tim Adams Memorial Trophy	OHL Cup MVP

=== Quebec Maritimes Junior Hockey League ===
Gilles-Courteau Trophy	Quebec Major Junior Hockey League champion
Jean Rougeau Trophy	Regular season champion
Luc Robitaille Trophy	Top scoring team
Robert Lebel Trophy	Lowest team goals against average
Mario Lemieux Trophy	Regular season top goal-scorer
Guy Lafleur Trophy	Playoff most valuable player
Telus Cup – Offensive	Best offensive player
Telus Cup – Defensive	Best defensive player
Guy Carbonneau Trophy	Best defensive forward
Kevin Lowe Trophy	Best defensive defenceman
Michel Bergeron Trophy	Offensive rookie of the year
Raymond Lagacé Trophy	Defensive rookie of the year
Sidney Crosby Trophy	Rookie of the year
Paul Dumont Trophy	Personality of the year
Maurice Filion Trophy	General Manager of the year
Jean Sawyer Trophy	Top marketing director
AutoPro Plaque	Top plus-minus (retired)
Philips Plaque	Best faceoff percentage (retired)

=== Western Hockey League ===
Ed Chynoweth Cup	Western Hockey League champion
WHL Playoff MVP	Playoff MVP
Scotty Munro Memorial Trophy	Regular season champion
Allen Paradice Memorial Trophy	Top on-ice official
St. Clair Group Trophy	Marketing/Public Relations award
WHL Plus-Minus Award	Top plus-minus

== See also ==
- List of National Hockey League awards
