= Jordan Binnington =

Canadian ice hockey player (born 1993)

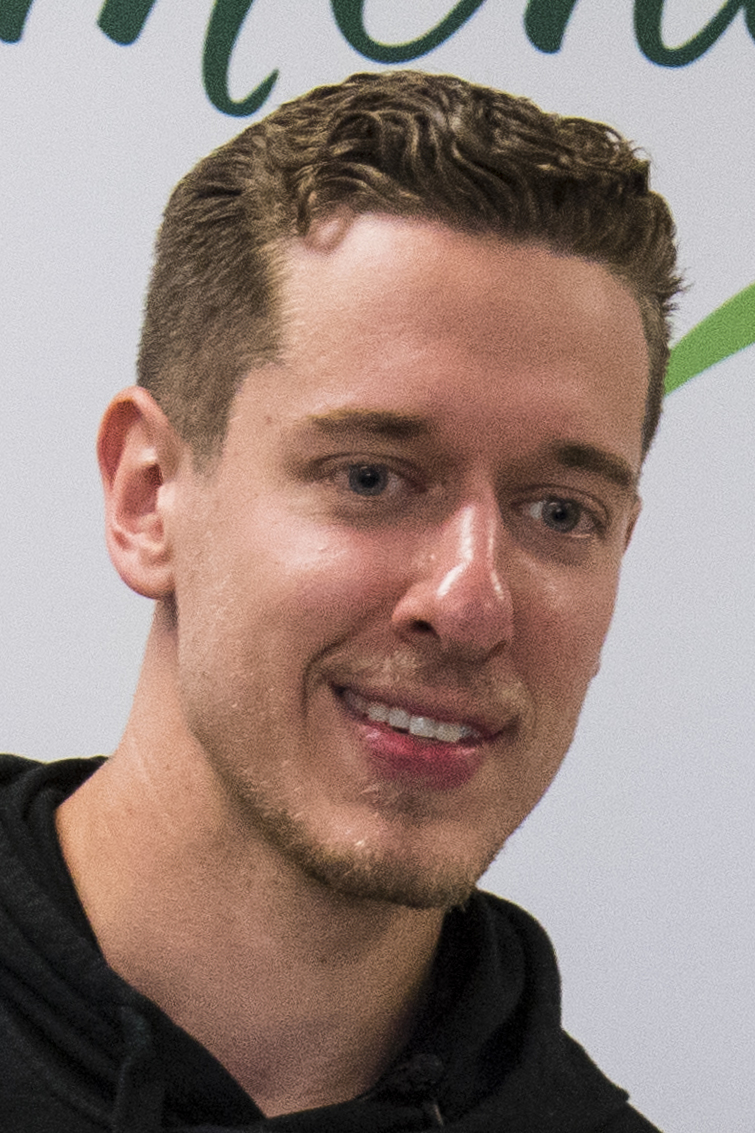
- Binnington in 2019
- Born: July 11, 1993 (age 33) Richmond Hill, Ontario, Canada
- Height: 6 ft 2 in (188 cm)
- Weight: 174 lb (79 kg; 12 st 6 lb)
- Position: Goaltender
- Catches: Left
- NHL team: St. Louis Blues
- National team: Canada
- NHL draft: 88th overall, 2011; St. Louis Blues
- Playing career: 2016–present

Jordan Binnington (born July 11, 1993) is a Canadian professional ice hockey player who is a goaltender for the St. Louis Blues of the National Hockey League (NHL). Binnington was raised in Richmond Hill and Toronto, Ontario. He played major junior hockey for the Owen Sound Attack of the Ontario Hockey League, winning the Hap Emms Memorial Trophy as best goaltender of the 2011 Memorial Cup and the 2013 Jim Rutherford Trophy as the OHL goaltender of the year. He was selected by the Blues in the third round, 88th overall, of the 2011 NHL entry draft. Binnington played for Canada in the 2013 World Junior Championships. He spent seven seasons in the minor leagues, with a brief call-up to the NHL in 2014 as an emergency goaltender before making his NHL on-ice debut in 2016. In December 2018, he was called up by the Blues and within a month became their starting goaltender. His play helped the team improve from last place in the league to winning the 2019 Stanley Cup championship. He is the first NHL rookie goaltender to earn 16 wins in a single postseason, the maximum number possible (not including the 2020 postseason, which included play-in games that enabled a goaltender to record more than 16 wins, a record held by Tampa Bay Lightning goaltender Andrei Vasilevskiy with 18 wins). He is the all-time wins leader for two franchises, the St. Louis Blues and the Owen Sound Attack.

== Playing career ==
=== Amateur ===
Binnington was selected by the major junior hockey club Owen Sound Attack of the Ontario Hockey League (OHL) in the second round of the 2009 OHL Priority Draft. Binnington made his OHL debut in the 2009–10 season, appearing in 22 games as the backup to Scott Stajcer, with a record of six wins, ten losses and two ties (6–10–2), sporting an 0.888 save percentage and a goals against average (GAA) of 4.44. He had a strong 2010–11 season posting a 27–12–5 record throughout 46 games with an 0.899 save percentage and a GAA of 3.05. He took over as the starting goalie when Stajcer went down with an injury. He was named to the 2011 Canadian Hockey League (CHL)'s Top Prospects Game in December 2010. During the 2011 OHL playoffs, Binnington was part of a three-goalie system including Stajcer and Michael Zador that led the Attack past the London Knights, the Plymouth Whalers, and the Windsor Spitfires to end up in the J. Ross Robertson Cup final versus the Mississauga St. Michael's Majors. The seven-game series was won by the Attack, with Binnington playing and winning the final two games when the team was facing elimination. The Owen Sound Attack advanced to the CHL's 2011 Memorial Cup tournament as OHL champions. After winning the first game against the Kootenay Ice of the Western Hockey League with Binnington in net, the Attack lost the next two games and then lost the tiebreaker with the Mississauga St. Michael's Majors, eliminating them from the tournament. Binnington finished the tournament with a record of 1–2, a GAA of 1.42 and a save percentage of 0.951, recording the only shutout by any team. For his play he was awarded the Hap Emms Memorial Trophy as the tournament's best goalie and was named to the Memorial Cup All-Star Team.

He returned to Owen Sound for the 2011–12 season, but was once again sharing the net with Stajcer. He posted a record of 27–17–1, with a save percentage of 0.906 and a GAA of 2.99. The Attack qualified for the 2012 OHL playoffs but were eliminated in the first round by the Kitchener Rangers. With Stajcer's departure in the 2012–13 season, Binnington became the undisputed starter for the Attack. On November 17, Binnington won his 66th game for the Attack in a 4–0 shutout win over the Kitchener Rangers, becoming the winningest goalie in franchise history. That began a string of three consecutive shutouts for the goaltender. He was rewarded for his excellent play by earning the Jim Rutherford Trophy as the OHL's top goaltender for the regular season with a record of 32–12–6, a save percentage of 0.932 (second in league) and a GAA of 2.17 (third in league). He also shared the Dave Pinkney Trophy with backup Michael Hope for allowing the league's fewest number of goals with 165. He was also named an OHL First Team All-Star.

=== Professional ===
==== St. Louis Blues ====
Ahead of the National Hockey League (NHL)'s 2011 entry draft, Binnington was ranked as the OHL's top eligible goaltender by the NHL Central Scouting Bureau's final ranking. He was selected with the 88th overall pick in the third round by the St. Louis Blues. Binnington signed a three-year entry-level contract with the Blues on May 29, 2012. Binnington was an emergency recall to the Blues' American Hockey League (AHL) affiliate, the Peoria Rivermen, at the end of the 2011–12 AHL season after their own starting goaltender, Jake Allen was recalled to the NHL and the backup, Alex Stalock, was out injured with a broken finger. Binnington played in one game, the final match of the season on April 16, a 4–2 loss to the Chicago Wolves.

After the end of his major junior career, Binnington was assigned to the Kalamazoo Wings of the ECHL for development to start the 2013–14 season as the Blues' had Allen and Matt Climie in the AHL. He recorded a 23–13–3 record, with a save percentage of 0.922 and a GAA of 2.35, winning the ECHL Rookie of the Month award for December. He was recalled to the Blues' new AHL affiliate, the Chicago Wolves, for one game on January 5, 2014, and earned his first win in the league in a 4–3 shootout win over the Rockford IceHogs. With the promotion of Allen to St. Louis full time, Binnington paired with Climie as the tandem for the Wolves for the 2014–15 season. On November 26, Binnington was called up from Chicago, under emergency conditions, following the injury to Blues goaltender Brian Elliott. However, he did not make any appearances and was returned to Chicago. He went 25–15–4 in 45 games with Chicago, with a save percentage of 0.912 and a GAA of 2.35. The Wolves qualified for the 2015 Calder Cup playoffs but were eliminated in the first round by the Utica Comets. Binnington appeared in all five games in the best-of-five series, ending with a 2–3 record and a 0.938 save percentage.

Binnington returned to the Wolves for the 2015–16 season. He made 41 appearances for Chicago, with a record of 17–18–5, a save percentage of 0.907 and a GAA of 2.85. He was recalled by St. Louis on January 9, 2016, after an injury to Allen and on January 14 he made his NHL in-game debut against the Carolina Hurricanes, coming in to relieve starter Elliott in a 4–1 loss. He was returned to Chicago on January 25. On July 15, Binnington signed a one-year, two-way contract with the Blues. Despite Elliott's trade to the Calgary Flames, the Blues signed Carter Hutton to be Allen's new backup in St. Louis and Binnington was assigned to Chicago to start the 2016–17 season. However, shortly after the season began, Allen was injured again and Binnington was recalled by the Blues to backup Hutton on October 9. He made no appearances and was returned to Chicago where he shared the net with the Blues' other goalie prospects, Ville Husso and Pheonix Copley. Binnington made 32 appearances in the AHL, going 16–7–3 with a save percentage of 0.911 and a GAA of 2.71. Chicago qualified for the 2017 Calder Cup playoffs, and made it to the second round, losing to the Grand Rapids Griffins. Binnington appeared in just two playoff games.

With the Blues playing the 2017–18 season without an AHL affiliate, St. Louis made an agreement with the Colorado Avalanche to send a goalie to their AHL affiliate, the San Antonio Rampage. The Blues chose Husso to send to San Antonio. With Hutton and Allen confirmed as the Blues' two NHL goalies, Binnington was at first reassigned to the Tulsa Oilers of the ECHL. Binnington balked at the assignment, refusing to report and went home to Richmond Hill. One of the organization's goalie coaches found a better situation for him, and the Blues sent him out on loan to the Providence Bruins. He was not recalled to the NHL during the 2017–18 season, finishing with 17 wins in 28 games for the Bruins with a save percentage of 0.926 and a GAA of 2.05. He was named to the 2018 AHL All-Star Classic alongside teammate Austin Czarnik.

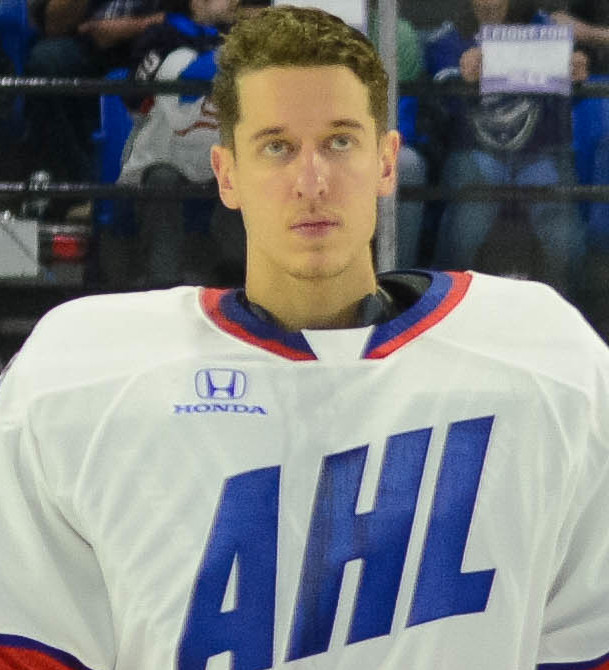
Jordan Binnington at the 2018 AHL All-Star Classic

During the off-season before the 2018–19 season, Binnington signed a one-year, two-way contract with the Blues on July 6, 2018. However, his path to the NHL was still blocked as the Blues signed Chad Johnson to a contract. Binnington was assigned to St. Louis' new AHL affiliate, the San Antonio Rampage, to begin the 2018–19 season as backup to Husso. He was recalled by the Blues on December 9 after Johnson was placed on waivers. The team had the worst record in the NHL on January 2, 2019. Five days later, on January 7, Binnington made his first NHL start, making 25 saves in a 3–0 shutout win over the Philadelphia Flyers and becoming the 35th NHL goaltender to earn a shutout in his first start. On February 11, Binnington was named the NHL First Star of the Week after going 3–0–0 to help the Blues to win six straight games and move into a Western Conference wild card spot. He was named the NHL Rookie of the Month in February and March 2019. On April 4, a 7–3 victory over the Philadelphia Flyers gave Binnington his 23rd win of the season, a record for a Blues rookie goaltender.

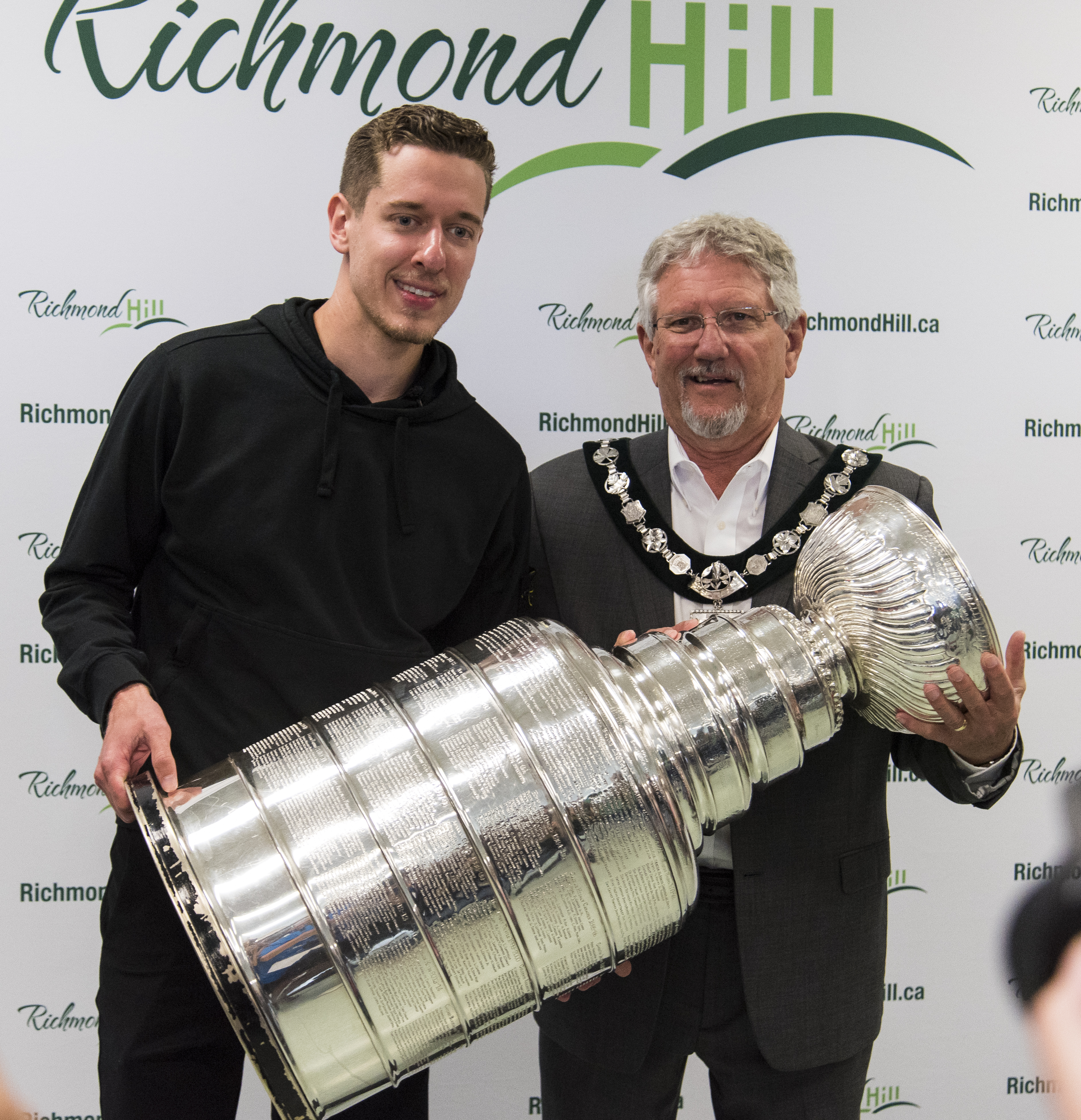
Binnington with the Stanley Cup in 2019

On April 10, Binnington played his first NHL playoff game, stopping 25 of 26 shots against the Winnipeg Jets in a 2–1 victory. On April 27, Binnington was announced as one of the three finalists for the Calder Memorial Trophy. After knocking out Winnipeg in six games, the Blues defeated the Dallas Stars in a seven-game second round series. On May 19, Binnington became the first St. Louis Blues rookie goaltender to record a shutout in the Stanley Cup playoffs, a 5–0 win against the San Jose Sharks, which gave the Blues a team-record 11 playoff victories. The Blues defeated the Sharks in six games to advance to the 2019 Stanley Cup Final where they met the Boston Bruins, the Eastern Conference champions. On June 12, the Blues defeated the Bruins in game seven to win the Stanley Cup, St. Louis' first in their 52-year franchise history. Binnington started every playoff game. With the Stanley Cup win, Binnington set an NHL record for most playoffs wins by a rookie goaltender in a single postseason, having won all 16 games needed to win the Stanley Cup.

In his Day with the Cup on July 12, Binnington brought the Stanley Cup to his hometown of Richmond Hill. The next day, the Blues re-signed Binnington to a two-year, $8.8 million contract extension. The following 2019–20 season was shortened by the onset of the COVID-19 pandemic, prematurely ending a strong season for the Blues that saw them win the Central Division and finish first in the Western Conference. Binnington recorded a 30–13–7 record and a .912 save percentage. In January he was selected to play in the 2020 NHL All-Star Game that took place in St. Louis, alongside Blues' teammates Alex Pietrangelo, Ryan O'Reilly, and David Perron. The 2020 Stanley Cup playoffs were held later in the year in a bubble environment in Canada. Binnington performed poorly in both the round robin phase and in the first-round series against the Vancouver Canucks, losing all five of his starts and recording a .851 save percentage. Backup goaltender Jake Allen was noted for backstopping the team's only victories in the postseason.

With the pandemic continuing, the NHL temporarily realigned its format for the 2020–21 season, with all teams playing exclusively in their own divisions for the regular season. The Blues finished fourth in the new West Division, with Binnington compiling an 18–14–8 recording and a 0.910 save percentage overall, finishing the season with a particularly strong stretch of games in April and an 0.921 save percentage. Binnington's April success did not carry over into the 2021 Stanley Cup playoffs, where the Blues were swept by the Colorado Avalanche in the first round, with Binnington having only a .899 save percentage, his second consecutive sub-.900 in the postseason.

On March 11, 2021, the Blues re-signed Binnington to a six-year, $36 million contract extension. With the division alignments and format returning to normal for the 2021–22 season, Binnington's struggles in net continued, and by the second half of the season he had been supplanted as the Blues' starting goaltender by Ville Husso. With Husso an unrestricted free agent at the end of the season and Binnington's lengthy and expensive contract on the books, this generated speculation about the future of team goaltending. The Blues qualified for the 2022 Stanley Cup playoffs, entering the first round as underdogs against the Minnesota Wild, with Husso starting in net. However, with the Blues down 2–1 in the series, Binnington reclaimed the net starting with game four and lead the team on a three-game winning streak to clinch the series. These were Binnington's first postseason wins since the 2019 Stanley Cup Final, and he finished the series with a 0.943 save percentage. In the second round, the Blues entered another matchup against the Avalanche. Binnington's strong performances continued through the first two games, with the series tied 1–1 heading back to St. Louis. Midway through the first period of game three, Binnington was injured when Avalanche forward Nazem Kadri and Blues defenceman Calle Rosén crashed into him and was forced to leave the game. With Husso returning to the net, the Blues lost. Blues coach Craig Berube, when asked about the incident, said only "look at Kadri's reputation. That's all I've got to say." Kadri denied that he had intended to injure Binnington by making the play. Binnington was alleged by Kadri to have hurled a water bottle at him during an on camera interview after the game. At the time of his departure, Binnington had stopped 167 of 176 shots faced over six games and a .949 save percentage. The Blues later confirmed that Binnington would miss the remainder of the playoffs.

In the 2022–23 season, Binnington was once again the Blues' starting goalie, appearing in 61 games with a record of 27–27–6, a save percentage of 0.894, and a GAA of 3.31. On December 12, 2022, Binnington won his 100th game in a 1–0 shutout against the Nashville Predators, making him the sixth goaltender in franchise history to earn 100 victories with the club. On March 15, 2023, Binnington punched Minnesota Wild forward Ryan Hartman following a goal where Hartman bumped into him after scoring. Binnington was ejected from the game, and the NHL suspended him for two games following the incident. Though Binnington was not the cause of the Blues failing to make the playoffs, coach Berube was quoted as saying his play was "up and down" during the season.

He returned as the Blues' starter for the 2023–24 season, appearing in 57 games, going 28–21–5, with a save percentage of 0.913, and a GAA of 2.84. His above average play was better than the team's according to analysts, though the Blues failed to make the playoffs for the second season in a row. In the 2024–25 season, again the Blues' starting goalie, he became the all-time franchise wins leader with 152 wins, surpassing Mike Liut, after a 3–0 shutout victory over the New Jersey Devils on November 27, 2024. Coming back from the 4 Nations Face-Off break, Binnington's play was a major reason why the Blues qualified for the 2025 Stanley Cup playoffs, going 13–3–1 with a 2.23 GAA and 0.910 save percentage. Overall, he made 56 appearances, with a record of 28–22–5, a 2.69 GAA, and a save percentage of 0.900. The Blues faced the Winnipeg Jets in the first round of the 2025 playoffs. Binnington started every game of the seven-game series, mostly outplaying his opposite in the Jets' net, Connor Hellebuyck. However, Binnington was beat in double overtime in game seven as the Blues were eliminated by the Jets. In the seven games, he had a 3–3–1 record, with a save percentage of 0.901 and a GAA of 2.53. Binnington began the 2025–26 season as the Blues' starting goaltender, but after the Winter Olympics break in 2026, he was surpassed by his backup, Joel Hofer, who took over as the team's starter. Binnington finished the season with subpar numbers, though improved after the break, but not enough to prevent Hofer from taking over his starting job. In 41 games, he had a record of 13–20–7, with a save percentage of 0.873 and a GAA of 3.33.

== International play ==
Medal record

Men's ice hockey

Representing Canada

Winter Olympics
Silver medal – second place	2026 Milano Cortina	

4 Nations Face-Off
Winner	2025 Canada/United States	

Binnington made his international debut for Canada with the national junior team at the 2013 World Junior Championships. Initially the backup goaltender behind Malcolm Subban, he played for the first time in the tournament after Subban was pulled midway through the semifinal against the United States, having allowed four goals. Canada was ultimately defeated 5–1, but Binnington's performance in relief was praised. He then started the bronze medal game against Russia, but fared less well there, and was pulled after allowing three goals on five shots. Canada finished fourth in the tournament.

Following the conclusion of the 2023–24 NHL regular season, with the Blues not qualifying for the 2024 Stanley Cup playoffs, Binnington accepted an invitation to make his senior national team debut at the 2024 World Championship. Again, Canada and Binnington competed for the bronze medal game, but ultimately fell 4–2 to Sweden, finishing fourth in the tournament.

In 2025, Binnington was selected as the starting goaltender for Canada in the 4 Nations Face-Off. Despite some people criticizing the decision made by Canadian head coach Jon Cooper, Binnington would beat Sweden in the first game of the round-robin tournament in overtime by a score of 4–3, stopping 25 out of 28 Swedish shots. The second game would come against the United States. Binnington stopped 20 out of 22 shots, but the Canadians fell 3–1. Binnington did have an assist, however, on the opening goal scored by Connor McDavid. The final round-robin game against Finland would be a crucial one, as whoever won this game would play the United States in the championship. Binnington stopped 23 out of 26 shots en route to a 5–3 Canadian victory. The championship game would be played at TD Garden in Boston, the same arena where Binnington shut down the Boston Bruins' offense in game seven of the 2019 Stanley Cup Final, leading to the St. Louis Blues' first Stanley Cup victory. Binnington was tested often, giving up one goal in each of the first two periods. The game would end up needing to go into overtime. Binnington robbed Auston Matthews multiple times of the game-winning goal, en route to another international Canadian victory with a final score of 3–2.

Later that year in May, after his NHL team had been eliminated from the playoffs, Binnington was invited again to play for Canada at the 2025 World Championship. Binnington's first start was Canada's third game, a 5–0 victory over France on May 13. He followed that with a second shutout in a 7–0 win over Slovakia. He won his third game in a row to clinch Group A with a 5–3 victory over Sweden. However, in the quarterfinals, Denmark upset Canada in 2–1 win, knocking them out of the tournament.

On December 31, 2025, he was named to Canada's roster to compete at the 2026 Winter Olympics. Binnington was named the team's starter and helped the team advance to the gold medal game, having posted a shutout in the team's tournament opening win against Czechia. In the tournament final, Binnington was beat by a Jack Hughes shot in overtime that secured the United States the win and Canada the silver medal.

== Personal life ==
In 2023, Binnington married Canadian actress Cristine Prosperi. They have one son.

== Career statistics ==
=== Regular season and playoffs ===
			Regular season									Playoffs
Season	Team	League	GP	W	L	OTL	MIN	GA	SO	GAA	SV%	GP	W	L	MIN	GA	SO	GAA	SV%
2008–09	Toronto Dixie Beehives	OJHL	1	0	1	0	59	3	0	3.04	.923	—	—	—	—	—	—	—	—
2009–10	Owen Sound Attack	OHL	22	6	10	2	1,068	79	0	4.44	.888	—	—	—	—	—	—	—	—
2010–11	Owen Sound Attack	OHL	46	27	12	5	2,596	132	1	3.05	.899	7	4	2	355	19	0	3.21	.894
2011–12	Owen Sound Attack	OHL	39	21	17	1	2,304	115	1	2.99	.906	2	0	2	120	10	0	5.00	.863
2011–12	Peoria Rivermen	AHL	1	0	1	0	60	3	0	3.02	.921	—	—	—	—	—	—	—	—
2012–13	Owen Sound Attack	OHL	50	32	12	6	3,011	109	7	2.17	.932	12	6	6	705	33	0	2.81	.916
2013–14	Kalamazoo Wings	ECHL	40	23	13	3	2,398	94	1	2.35	.922	3	1	1	223	7	0	1.89	.946
2013–14	Chicago Wolves	AHL	1	1	0	0	65	3	0	2.78	.912	—	—	—	—	—	—	—	—
2014–15	Chicago Wolves	AHL	45	25	15	4	2,555	100	3	2.35	.916	5	2	3	333	12	0	2.16	.938
2015–16	Chicago Wolves	AHL	41	17	18	5	2,340	111	1	2.85	.907	—	—	—	—	—	—	—	—
2015–16	St. Louis Blues	NHL	1	0	0	0	13	1	0	4.69	.750	—	—	—	—	—	—	—	—
2016–17	Chicago Wolves	AHL	32	16	7	8	1,879	85	2	2.71	.911	2	0	0	65	2	0	1.86	.950
2017–18	Providence Bruins	AHL	28	17	9	1	1,606	55	1	2.05	.926	3	1	1	137	10	0	4.39	.865
2018–19	San Antonio Rampage	AHL	16	11	4	0	922	32	3	2.08	.927	—	—	—	—	—	—	—	—
2018–19	St. Louis Blues	NHL	32	24	5	1	1,876	59	5	1.89	.927	26	16	10	1,560	64	1	2.46	.914
2019–20	St. Louis Blues	NHL	50	30	13	7	2,848	126	3	2.56	.912	5	0	5	267	21	0	4.72	.851
2020–21	St. Louis Blues	NHL	42	18	14	8	2,448	108	0	2.65	.910	4	0	4	234	14	0	3.59	.899
2021–22	St. Louis Blues	NHL	37	18	14	4	2,145	112	2	3.13	.901	6	4	1	315	9	0	1.72	.949
2022–23	St. Louis Blues	NHL	61	27	27	6	3,517	194	2	3.31	.894	—	—	—	—	—	—	—	—
2023–24	St. Louis Blues	NHL	57	28	21	5	3,291	156	3	2.84	.913	—	—	—	—	—	—	—	—
2024–25	St. Louis Blues	NHL	56	28	22	5	3,239	145	3	2.69	.900	7	3	4	451	19	0	2.53	.901
2025–26	St. Louis Blues	NHL	41	13	20	7	2,308	128	1	3.33	.873	—	—	—	—	—	—	—	—
NHL totals			377	186	136	43	21,784	1,029	19	2.83	.903	48	23	24	2,825	127	1	2.70	.909

=== International ===
Year	Team	Event	Result	GP	W	L	OT	MIN	GA	SO	GAA	SV%
2013	Canada	WJC	4th	2	0	0	0	35	4	0	6.82	.871
2024	Canada	WC	4th	8	6	2	0	492	23	0	2.81	.885
2025	Canada	4NF	1st place, gold medalist(s)	4	3	1	0	253	10	0	2.37	.907
2025	Canada	WC	5th	4	3	1	0	239	5	2	1.25	.944
2026	Canada	OG	2nd place, silver medalist(s)	5	4	1	0	303	9	1	1.78	.917
Junior totals				2	0	0	0	35	4	0	6.82	.871
Senior totals				21	16	5	0	1,287	47	3	2.19	.912

== Awards and honours ==
Award	Year	Ref
OHL
Hap Emms Memorial Trophy	2011	
Memorial Cup All-Star Team	2011	
Dave Pinkney Trophy	2013	
OHL First Team All-Star	2013	
OHL Goaltender of the Year	2013	
AHL
AHL All-Star Game	2018	
NHL
NHL Rookie of the Month	February 2019, March 2019	
Stanley Cup champion	2019	
NHL All-Rookie Team	2019	
NHL All-Star Game	2020	

=== NHL record ===
- Most wins in a single playoff season by a rookie goaltender, 16 (2018–19) (This record can only be matched, not beaten, as 16 is the maximum number of wins possible in a single playoff season)
