= 2020–21 OHL season =

- League: Ontario Hockey League
- Sport: Hockey
- Duration: Cancelled
- Teams: 20
- TV partner(s): Rogers TV, Shaw TV, YourTV, Sportsnet
- Finals champions: None

OHL seasons
- 2019–20 2021–22

2020–21 CHL season
- League: Canadian Hockey League
- Sport: Hockey
- Duration: OHL; Did not play QMJHL; October 2020 – June 2021; WHL; February 2021 – May 2021
- Teams: 60
- TV partner(s): RDS; Rogers Sportsnet; Rogers TV; Shaw TV

The 2020–21 OHL season would have been the 41st season of the Ontario Hockey League. After the 2019–20 OHL season was curtailed due to the COVID-19 pandemic, the league initially planned to play a full 68-game regular season beginning in September 2020. However, due to continued public health orders and increasing cases of COVID-19 in Ontario, the league eventually shortened the planned season and postponed it indefinitely in December 2020. By April 2021, the league ultimately cancelled the season.

== Postponement and cancellation ==
The regular season was originally planned to begin in September 2020 and end in March 2021 as each of the 20 teams would play 68 games, followed by 16 teams playing in the post-season. On August 5, 2020, the OHL announced that the start of the regular season was moved to December 1, 2020, and would end on April 29, 2021. Each team was to play a condensed 64 game schedule, followed by a playoff format in which 16, eight from each conference, would participate in.

On October 29, the league announced an updated timeline for the season, moving the opening date of the regular season to February 4, 2021. The regular season would end on May 8, 2021, as the clubs would play a 40 game schedule against opponents in their geographic region. The post-season would consist of eight teams playing three rounds to determine the J. Ross Robertson Cup champion.

Due to Ontario's provincewide shutdown in December 2020, which ordered the closure of all sports and recreation facilities with limited exceptions for "high-performance athletes and specified professional leagues", the OHL delayed the season indefinitely on December 23, 2020, and stated that they would work with health officials in order to determine potential start dates in 2021. While it had discussed the use of hub cities as used in portions of the WHL and QMJHL seasons, the OHL had not yet announced any plans for a return to play while still committed to a 2020–21 season.

In April 2021, Ontario implemented a second provincewide shutdown and stay-at-home order due to widespread infections involving variants of concern. The OHL was intended to host the 2021 Memorial Cup, but no host city was ever announced. On April 13, 2021, the Memorial Cup was cancelled for the second season in a row due to logistical issues associated with the pandemic. On April 20, 2021, the OHL announced that due to continued public health orders and the need to provide certainty to players and staff, the 2020–21 season has been cancelled and would not be played.

== Awards ==
Regular season — Player awards
Trophy name	Recognition	Recipient
Roger Neilson Memorial Award	Top academic college/university player	Adam Varga, Ottawa 67's
Ivan Tennant Memorial Award	Top academic high school player	Lawson Sherk, Hamilton Bulldogs
Prospect player awards
Trophy name	Recognition	Recipient
Jack Ferguson Award	First overall pick in priority selection	Quentin Musty, Sudbury Wolves

== 2021 OHL Priority Selection ==
On May 5, 2021, the league announced the results of their first-ever Ontario Hockey League Priority Selection Draft Lottery. The Sudbury Wolves won the lottery and selected Quentin Musty from the North Jersey Avalanche of the AYHL. The Niagara IceDogs forfeited their first round draft pick due to violating league recruitment rules.

These are the results for the first round of the draft:

#	Player	Nationality	OHL team	Hometown	Minor team
1	Quentin Musty (RW)	United States	Sudbury Wolves	Hamburg, New York	North Jersey Avalanche (AYHL)
2	Calum Ritchie (C)	Canada	Oshawa Generals	Oakville, Ontario	Oakville Rangers (OMHA-SCTA)
3	Cameron Allen (D)	Canada	Guelph Storm	Toronto, Ontario	Toronto Nationals (GTHL)
4	Ethan Miedema (LW)	Canada	Windsor Spitfires	Cobourg, Ontario	Quinte Red Devils (OMHA-ETA)
5	Matthew Soto (RW)	Canada	Kingston Frontenacs	Oakville, Ontario	Oakville Rangers (OMHA-SCTA)
6	Nick Lardis (RW)	Canada	Peterborough Petes	Oakville, Ontario	Oakville Rangers (OMHA-SCTA)
7	Tristan Bertucci (D)	Canada	Flint Firebirds	Vaughan, Ontario	Toronto Marlboros (GTHL)
8	Colby Barlow (RW)	Canada	Owen Sound Attack	Vaughan, Ontario	Toronto Marlboros (GTHL)
9	Luke Misa (C)	Canada	Mississauga Steelheads	Oakville, Ontario	Oakville Rangers (OMHA-SCTA)
10	Carey Terrance (C)	Canada / (United States) USA	Erie Otters	Akwesasne, New York	Kemptville 73's (CCHL)
11	Owen Outwater (C)	Canada	North Bay Battalion	Orleans, Ontario	Oakville Rangers (OMHA-SCTA)
12	Christopher Barlas (C)	Canada	Ottawa 67's	Ottawa, Ontario	Navan Grads (CCHL)
13	Angus MacDonell (C)	Canada	Sarnia Sting	Toronto, Ontario	Toronto Marlboros (GTHL)
14	Alex Pharand (C)	Canada	Hamilton Bulldogs	Sudbury, Ontario	Sudbury Nickel Capital Wolves (NOHA)
15	Luke McNamara (C)	Canada	Saginaw Spirit	Mississauga, Ontario	Bishop Kearney Selects (Youth-USA)
16	Denver Barkey (C)	Canada	London Knights	Maple, Ontario	Toronto Titans (GTHL)
17	Carson Rehkopf (C/LW)	Canada	Kitchener Rangers	Vaughan, Ontario	Toronto Jr. Canadiens (GTHL)
18	Justin Cloutier (RW)	Canada	Sault Ste. Marie Greyhounds	Ottawa, Ontario	Ottawa Jr. Senators (CCHL)
19	Beau Akey (D)	Canada	Barrie Colts	Waterloo, Ontario	Waterloo Wolves (MHAO)

== 2021 CHL Import Draft ==
On June 30, 2021, the Canadian Hockey League conducted the 2021 CHL Import Draft, in which teams in all three CHL leagues participate in. The Barrie Colts held the first pick in the draft by a team in the OHL. The Colts selected Artur Cholach from Ukraine with the OHL's first selection in the draft.

Below are the players who were selected in the first round by Ontario Hockey League teams in the 2021 CHL Import Draft.

#	Player	Nationality	OHL team	Hometown	Last team
3	Artur Cholach (D)	Ukraine	Barrie Colts	Novoyavorivsk, Ukraine	Sokil Kyiv
6	Kirill Kudryavtsev (D)	Russia	Sault Ste. Marie Greyhounds	Yaroslavl, Russia	Loco-Junior Yaroslavl Jr. B
9	Filip Mesar (RW)	Slovakia	Kitchener Rangers	Spišská Belá, Slovakia	Poprad HK
12	Ruslan Gazizov (LW)	Russia	London Knights	Omsk, Russia	Omsk Yastreby
15	Matyas Sapovaliv (C)	Czech Republic	Saginaw Spirit	Kladno, Czech Republic	Litomerice Stadion HC
18	Rodwin Dionicio (D)	Switzerland	Niagara IceDogs	Bern, Switzerland	Bern Jr.
21	No selection made		Hamilton Bulldogs		
24	Andrei Malyavin (D)	Russia	Sarnia Sting	Voronezh, Russia	Loco-Junior Yaroslavl Jr. B
27	Vinzenz Rohrer (RW)	Austria	Ottawa 67's	Küsnacht, Switzerland	GCK Lions Jr.
30	Aleksander Lukin (D)	Russia	North Bay Battalion	Chekhov, Russia	Chekhov Russkie Vityazi
33	Jiri Tichacek (D)	Czech Republic	Erie Otters	Kladno, Czech Republic	Rytiri Kladno Jr.
36	No selection made		Mississauga Steelheads		
39	Servac Petrovsky (C)	Czech Republic	Owen Sound Attack	Veľký Šariš, Czech Republic	Reprezentacia SR U18
42	Simon Slavicek (RW)	Czech Republic	Flint Firebirds	Prague, Czech Republic	Slavia Praha Jr.
45	Adrian Klein (D)	Germany	Peterborough Petes	Neustadt an der Waldnaab, Germany	Straubing Tigers
48	Leevi Merilainen (G)	Finland	Kingston Frontenacs	Oulu, Finland	Karpat Oulu U20
51	Avval Baisov (LW)	Russia	Windsor Spitfires	Khanty-Mansiysk, Russia	Khanty-Mansiysk Mamonty Yugry
54	Valentin Zhugin (LW)	Russia	Guelph Storm	Magnitogorsk, Russia	Magnitogorsk Stalnye Lisy
56	Kevin Niedenz (RW)	Germany	Oshawa Generals	Berlin, Germany	Bad Nauheim EC
58	Tomas Trunda (RW)	Czech Republic	Sudbury Wolves	Prague, Czech Republic	Mount St. Charles Academy 16U

== 2021 NHL entry draft ==
On July 23–24, 2021, the National Hockey League conducted the 2021 NHL entry draft held via video conference call. Mason McTavish of the Peterborough Petes was the highest player from the OHL to be selected, as he was taken with the third overall pick by the Anaheim Ducks. A total of 30 players were drafted from the OHL.

Below are the players selected from OHL teams at the NHL Entry Draft.

Round	#	Player	Nationality	NHL team	Hometown	OHL team
1	3	Mason McTavish (C)	Canada	Anaheim Ducks	Carp, Ontario	Peterborough Petes
1	8	Brandt Clarke (D)	Canada	Los Angeles Kings	Nepean, Ontario	Barrie Colts
1	16	Brennan Othmann (LW)	Canada	New York Rangers	Pickering, Ontario	Flint Firebirds
1	23	Wyatt Johnston (C)	Canada	Dallas Stars	Toronto, Ontario	Windsor Spitfires
1	29	Chase Stillman (RW)	Canada	New Jersey Devils	Sudbury, Ontario	Sudbury Wolves
1	31	Logan Mailloux (D)	Canada	Montreal Canadiens	Belle River, Ontario	London Knights
2	38	Daniil Chayka (D)	Russia	Vegas Golden Knights	Moscow, Russia	Guelph Storm
2	42	Francesco Pinelli (C)	Canada	Los Angeles Kings	Stoney Creek, Ontario	Kitchener Rangers
2	49	Ben Roger (D)	Canada	Ottawa Senators	Brighton, Ontario	London Knights
3	67	Ryan Winterton (C)	Canada	Seattle Kraken	Whitby, Ontario	Hamilton Bulldogs
3	81	Benjamin Gaudreau (G)	Canada	San Jose Sharks	Corbeil, Ontario	Sarnia Sting
3	85	Brett Harrison (C)	Canada	Boston Bruins	Dorchester, Ontario	Oshawa Generals
3	93	Tristan Lennox (G)	Canada	New York Islanders	Cambridge, Ontario	Saginaw Spirit
3	95	Josh Bloom (LW)	Canada	Buffalo Sabres	Oakville, Ontario	Saginaw Spirit
4	99	Ville Ottavainen (D)	Finland	Seattle Kraken	Oulu, Finland	Kitchener Rangers
4	105	Ethan Del Mastro (D)	Canada	Chicago Blackhawks	Freelton, Ontario	Mississauga Steelheads
4	121	Ethan Cardwell (RW)	Canada	San Jose Sharks	Courtice, Ontario	Barrie Colts
4	124	Jack Matier (D)	Canada	Nashville Predators	Sault Ste. Marie, Ontario	Ottawa 67's
5	135	Artem Guryev (D)	Russia	San Jose Sharks	Moscow, Russia	Peterborough Petes
5	143	Jacob Holmes (D)	Canada	Dallas Stars	Alliston, Ontario	Sault Ste. Marie Greyhounds
5	153	Ty Voit (RW)	United States	Toronto Maple Leafs	Pittsburgh, Pennsylvania	Sarnia Sting
5	156	Max McCue (LW)	Canada	San Jose Sharks	Sudbury, Ontario	London Knights
6	166	Pasquale Zito (RW)	Canada	Detroit Red Wings	Ottawa, Ontario	Windsor Spitfires
6	168	Jack Beck (LW)	Canada	Calgary Flames	Richmond Hill, Ontario	Ottawa 67's
6	170	Bryce Montgomery (D)	United States	Carolina Hurricanes	Bowie, Maryland	London Knights
6	175	Francesco Arcuri (LW)	Canada	Dallas Stars	Woodbridge, Ontario	Kingston Frontenacs
6	178	Connor Lockhart (C)	Canada	Vancouver Canucks	Kanata, Ontario	Erie Otters
6	181	Ryan Mast (D)	United States	Boston Bruins	Bloomfield, Michigan	Sarnia Sting
7	210	Braden Haché (D)	Canada	Florida Panthers	Newmarket, Ontario	Kingston Frontenacs
7	214	Joe Vrbetic (G)	Canada	Montreal Canadiens	Dunvegan, Ontario	North Bay Battalion

== 2021 IIHF World Junior Championship ==
The 2021 IIHF World Junior Championship was held at Rogers Place in Edmonton, Alberta starting on December 25, 2020. The tournament concluded on January 5, 2021.

Twenty-seven current and former OHL players were on eight rosters in this tournament, including eight on Canada, four on the Czech Republic, three on Germany, three on Slovakia, two on Finland, two on Russia, two on the United States, two on Switzerland and one on Austria.

=== Austria ===
Team Austria had one player on their roster that played in the OHL. Marco Rossi of the Ottawa 67's was the lone OHL player on the team.

In four games, Rossi earned no points.

Austria finished in fifth place in Group B, as the team did not earn any points during their four games. They finished the tournament in tenth place.

=== Canada ===
The Canadian team had eight players on their roster that plays in the OHL. The players on the Canadian team were: Quinton Byfield (Sudbury Wolves); Jamie Drysdale (Erie Otters); Thomas Harley (Mississauga Steelheads); Connor McMichael (London Knights); Cole Perfetti (Saginaw Spirit); Jack Quinn, (Ottawa 67's); Ryan Suzuki (Saginaw Spirit); and Philip Tomasino (Oshawa Generals). Andre Tourigny, the head coach of the Ottawa 67's, is the head coach of the Canadian team.

McMichael finished second in team scoring, as he scored four goals and eight points in seven games. Byfield finished the tournament with two goals and seven points in seven games, Perfetti scored two goals and six points in seven games and Tomasino recorded four goals and six points in seven games. Quinn scored one goal and five points in seven games, Suzuki had two goals and four points in seven games. On defense, Drysdale earned two assists in seven games and Harley scored a goal in seven games

Canada finished in first place in Group A during the preliminary round, as they recorded 12 points. In the quarter-finals, Canada shutout the Czech Republic 3-0, followed by a 5-0 shutout victory over Russia in the semi-finals, earning a berth in the gold medal game. In the final game, Canada lost to the United States 2-0, claiming the silver medal in the tournament.

=== Czech Republic ===
The Czech Republic had four OHL players on their roster. Martin Has (Guelph Storm); Nick Malik, (Sault Ste. Marie Greyhounds); Jan Mysak (Hamilton Bulldogs); and Jaromir Pytlik, (Sault Ste. Marie Greyhounds) were on the team.

Mysak scored two goals and three points in five games during the tournament, while Has earned an assist in five games. In four games, Malik posted a 1-2-0 record with a 2.90 GAA and a 0.890 save percentage, while earning a shutout.

The team finished the preliminary round in fourth place in Group B, as the Czech Republic earned six points in four games. The Czech Republic finished the tournament in seventh place as they lost to Canada by a score of 3–0 in the quarter-finals.

=== Finland ===
Team Finland had two OHL players on their roster. Kari Piiroinen of the Windsor Spitfires and Ruben Rafkin of the Windsor Spitires represented Finland at the tournament.

Piiroinen posted a 4-2-0 record with a 2.18 GAA and a 0.915 save percentage in six games, while Rafkin appeared in one game, earning no points.

Finland finished the preliminary round with nine points and in second place in Group A. Finland defeated Sweden 3-2 in the quarter-finals, however, they lost to the United States in the semi-finals by a score of 4-3. In the bronze medal game, Finland defeated Russia 4-1.

=== Germany ===
Team Germany had one player from the OHL on their roster as Josh Samanski of the Owen Sound Attack was the lone current OHL player on the team. OHL graduates Manuel Alberg, formerly of the Owen Sound Attack and currently playing with EC Red Bull Salzburg and Filip Reisnecker, formerly of the Mississauga Steelheads and currently playing with Fischtown Pinguins, were also on the roster.

In five games, Alberg earned two assists. In two games, both Samanski and Reisnecker were held off the score sheet.

Germany finished the preliminary round in third place in Group A, as the team earned five points in four games. In the quarter-finals, Germany lost to Russia by a close score of 2–1 to finish in sixth place in the tournament.

=== Russia ===
Team Russia had two players from the OHL on their roster. Egor Afanasyev of the Windsor Spitfires and Daniil Chayka of the Guelph Storm represented Russia at the tournament.

Afanasyev scored two goals and five points in seven games, while Chayka earned no points in six games.

Russia finished in second place in Group B during the preliminary round, earning eight points. In the quarter-finals, Russia defeated Germany by a score of 2-1. In the semi-finals, they lost to Canada 5-0 and an appearance in the bronze medal game. In the final game, Russia lost to Finland 4-1 to finish the tournament in fourth place.

=== Slovakia ===
Team Slovakia had three players from the OHL on their roster. The players were Martin Chromiak of the Kingston Frontenacs, Dominik Jendek of the Windsor Spitfires and David Mudrak of the Oshawa Generals.

In five games, Chromiak scored a goal, while both Jendek and Mudrak were held to no points.

Slovakia finished the preliminary round in fourth place in Group A, as the team earned four points in four games. In the quarter-finals, Slovakia lost to the United States by a score of 5–2.

=== Switzerland ===
Team Switzerland had two players from the OHL on their roster. Giancarlo Chanton of the Niagara IceDogs and Noah Delemont of the Owen Sound Attack represented Switzerland at the tournament.

Delemont scored a goal in three games for Switzerland, while Chanton had no points in four games.

Switzerland finished in last place in Group A during the preliminary round, earning no points in four games. The team finished the tournament in ninth place.

=== United States ===
The United States had two players of the OHL on their roster. The players were Arthur Kaliyev of the Hamilton Bulldogs and Hunter Skinner of the London Knights.

Kaliyev scored three goals and eight points in seven games, which placed him in a tie for second on the team scoring list. Skinner appeared in one game, earning no points.

The United States finished in first place in Group B during the preliminary round as they earned nine points. In the quarter-finals, the USA defeated Slovakia 5-2. In the semi-finals, they defeated Finland by a score of 4-3, advancing to the gold medal game. In the final game of the tournament, the United States shutout Canada 2-0 to win the gold medal for the fifth time in the history of the tournament.

== 2021 IIHF World U18 Championship ==
The 2021 IIHF World U18 Championships was held in the Dallas-Fort Worth metroplex in two venues, the Children's Health StarCenter in Plano and at the Comerica Center in Frisco starting on April 26, 2021. The tournament concluded on May 6, 2021.

Twenty-seven current and former OHL players were on eight rosters in this tournament, including eight on Canada, four on the Czech Republic, three on Germany, three on Slovakia, two on Finland, two on Russia, two on the United States, two on Switzerland and one on Austria.

=== Canada ===
The Canadian team had thirteen players on their roster that play in the OHL. The players on the Canadian team were: Brandt Clarke, Barrie Colts; Ethan Del Mastro, Mississauga Steelheads; Benjamin Gaudreau, Sarnia Sting; Brett Harrison, Oshawa Generals; Wyatt Johnston, Windsor Spitfires; Jack Matier, Ottawa 67's; Mason McTavish, Peterborough Petes; Brennan Othmann, Flint Firebirds; Francesco Pinelli, Kitchener Rangers; Chase Stillman, Sudbury Wolves; Ryan Winterton, Hamilton Bulldogs; Shane Wright, Kingston Frontenacs; and Danny Zhilkin, Guelph Storm.

Wright was named captain of the team, while McTavish served as an alternate captain.

Wright led Canada in scoring, as he had nine goals and 14 points in five games. His nine goals set a Canadian record for most goals by one player at the tournament. McTavish scored five goals and 11 points in seven games, while Pinelli had four goals and 11 points in seven games. In goal, Gaudreau posted a 5-0-0 record with a 2.20 GAA and a .919 save percentage.

Canada finished in first place in Group A during the preliminary round, as they recorded 12 points in four games. In the quarter-finals, Canada defeated the Czech Republic 10-3, followed by another lopsided victory, as the team defeated Sweden 8-1 to earn a berth in the gold medal game. In the final game, Canada defeated Russia 5-3 to win the tournament.

Preceded by 2019–20 OHL season	OHL seasons	Succeeded by 2021–22 OHL season
