= 2003–04 OHL season =

- League: Ontario Hockey League
- Sport: Ice hockey
- Duration: Regular season Sept. 2003 – March 2004; Playoffs; March 2004 – May 2004
- Teams: 20
- TV partner(s): Rogers TV, TVCogeco

Draft
- Top draft pick: Patrick McNeill
- Picked by: Saginaw Spirit

Regular season
- Hamilton Spectator Trophy: London Knights (1)
- Season MVP: Corey Locke (Ottawa 67's)
- Top scorer: Corey Locke (Ottawa 67's)

Playoffs
- Playoffs MVP: Martin St. Pierre (Storm)
- Finals champions: Guelph Storm
- Runners-up: Mississauga IceDogs

OHL seasons
- 2002–03 2004–05

2003–04 CHL season
- League: Canadian Hockey League
- Sport: Ice hockey
- Duration: OHL; Sept. 2003 – March 2004; QMJHL; Sept. 2003 – March 2004; WHL; Sept. 2003 – March 2004
- Teams: 60
- TV partner(s): RDS; Rogers Sportsnet; Rogers TV; Shaw TV
- Season MVP: Sidney Crosby (Rimouski Océanic) (QMJHL)
- Top scorer: Sidney Crosby (Rimouski Océanic) (QMJHL)

Memorial Cup
- Finals champions: Kelowna Rockets (WHL) (1st title)
- Runners-up: Gatineau Olympiques (QMJHL)

The 2003–04 OHL season was the 24th season of the Ontario Hockey League. In November 2003, the OHL Board of Governors renamed the OHL Humanitarian of the Year Award to the Dan Snyder Memorial Trophy, in recognition of former Owen Sound Platers player, Dan Snyder, who died in a car accident in September 2003. Twenty teams each played 68 games. The J. Ross Robertson Cup was won by the Guelph Storm, who swept the Mississauga IceDogs in the league final.

== Regular season ==
=== Final standings ===
Note: DIV = Division; GP = Games played; W = Wins; L = Losses; T = Ties; OTL = Overtime losses; GF = Goals for; GA = Goals against; PTS = Points; x = clinched playoff berth; y = clinched division title; z = clinched conference title

=== Eastern conference ===
Rank	Team	DIV	GP	W	L	T	OTL	PTS	GF	GA
1	z-Toronto St. Michael's Majors	Central	68	38	21	7	2	85	210	187
2	y-Ottawa 67's	East	68	29	26	9	4	71	238	220
3	x-Mississauga IceDogs	Central	68	36	21	7	4	83	217	199
4	x-Barrie Colts	Central	68	31	21	12	4	78	196	171
5	x-Kingston Frontenacs	East	68	30	28	7	3	70	210	221
6	x-Oshawa Generals	East	68	30	29	8	1	69	188	206
7	x-Brampton Battalion	Central	68	25	32	9	2	61	180	221
8	x-Sudbury Wolves	Central	68	25	32	6	5	61	185	220
9	Peterborough Petes	East	68	22	40	3	3	50	191	244
10	Belleville Bulls	East	68	15	44	8	1	39	172	279

=== Western conference ===
Rank	Team	DIV	GP	W	L	T	OTL	PTS	GF	GA
1	z-London Knights	Midwest	68	53	11	2	2	110	300	147
2	y-Sarnia Sting	West	68	37	23	4	4	82	220	210
3	x-Guelph Storm	Midwest	68	49	14	5	0	103	276	182
4	x-Kitchener Rangers	Midwest	68	34	26	6	2	76	254	235
5	x-Plymouth Whalers	West	68	32	24	9	3	76	220	204
6	x-Owen Sound Attack	Midwest	68	30	27	7	4	71	202	210
7	x-Erie Otters	Midwest	68	29	26	6	7	71	221	212
8	x-Windsor Spitfires	West	68	27	30	3	8	65	201	219
9	Sault Ste. Marie Greyhounds	West	68	30	34	3	1	64	196	223
10	Saginaw Spirit	West	68	16	45	3	4	39	161	228

=== Scoring leaders ===
Player	Team	GP	G	A	Pts	PIM
Corey Locke	Ottawa 67's	65	51	67	118	82
Corey Perry	London Knights	66	40	73	113	98
Martin St. Pierre	Guelph Storm	68	45	65	110	95
Eric Himelfarb	Kingston Frontenacs	67	37	70	107	80
Daniel Sisca	Sarnia Sting	67	34	66	100	89
Rob Hisey	Erie Otters	63	38	58	96	63
Mike Richards	Kitchener Rangers	58	36	53	89	82
Scott Sheppard	London Knights	68	29	59	88	75
Patrick O'Sullivan	Mississauga IceDogs	53	43	39	82	32
John Mitchell	Plymouth Whalers	65	28	54	82	45

=== Leading goaltenders ===
Player	Team	GP	Mins	W	L	T	GA	SO	Sv%	GAA
Ryan MacDonald	London Knights	38	2185	28	5	0	75	2	0.928	2.06
Gerald Coleman	London Knights	33	1851	24	6	2	68	5	0.931	2.20
Paulo Colaiacovo	Barrie Colts	58	3356	24	17	4	131	4	0.924	2.34
Adam Dennis	Guelph Storm	46	2662	33	10	0	111	3	0.907	2.50
Justin Peters	Toronto St. Michael's Majors	53	3149	30	14	2	139	4	0.910	2.65

== Playoffs ==
Conference quarterfinals
E1	Toronto	4
E8	Sudbury	3
E2	Ottawa	3
E7	Brampton	4
E4	Barrie	4
E5	Kingston	1
E3	Mississauga	4
E6	Oshawa	3
W1	London	4
W8	Windsor	0
W2	Sarnia	1
W7	Erie	4
W4	Kitchener	1
W5	Plymouth	4
W3	Guelph	4
W6	Owen Sound	3

Conference semifinals
E1	Toronto	4
E7	Brampton	1
E4	Barrie	3
E3	Mississauga	4
W1	London	4
W7	Erie	0
W5	Plymouth	0
W3	Guelph	4

Conference finals
E1	Toronto	2
E3	Mississauga	4
W1	London	3
W3	Guelph	4

Finals
E3	Mississauga	0
W3	Guelph	4

=== Conference quarterfinals ===
==== (E1) Toronto St. Michael's Majors vs. (E8) Sudbury Wolves ====
March 19	Toronto St. Michael's Majors	2 – 0	Sudbury Wolves	St. Michael's College School Arena
No scoring		First period	No scoring
4:18 - Thomas Waugh (1); 17:08 - pp - Tim Brent (1)		Second period	No scoring
No scoring		Third period	No scoring
Justin Peters (27 saves / 27 shots)		Goalie stats	Patrick Ehelechner (25 saves / 27 shots)

March 21	Sudbury Wolves	2 – 0	Toronto St. Michael's Majors	Sudbury Community Arena

March 23	Toronto St. Michael's Majors	3 – 1	Sudbury Wolves	St. Michael's College School Arena

March 24	Sudbury Wolves	1 – 2	Toronto St. Michael's Majors	Sudbury Community Arena

March 26	Toronto St. Michael's Majors	3 – 4	2OT	Sudbury Wolves	St. Michael's College School Arena

March 29	Sudbury Wolves	4 – 0	Toronto St. Michael's Majors	Sudbury Community Arena

March 30	Toronto St. Michael's Majors	5 – 2	Sudbury Wolves	St. Michael's College School Arena

Toronto wins series 4 – 3

==== (E2) Ottawa 67's vs. (E7) Brampton Battalion ====
March 19	Ottawa 67's	7 – 5	Brampton Battalion	Ottawa Civic Centre

March 21	Brampton Battalion	4 – 3	OT	Ottawa 67's	Powerade Centre

March 23	Ottawa 67's	1 – 2	Brampton Battalion	Ottawa Civic Centre

March 25	Brampton Battalion	3 – 4	OT	Ottawa 67's	Powerade Centre

March 27	Ottawa 67's	2 – 4	Brampton Battalion	Ottawa Civic Centre

March 28	Brampton Battalion	3 – 6	Ottawa 67's	Powerade Centre

March 30	Ottawa 67's	1 – 3	Brampton Battalion	Ottawa Civic Centre

Ottawa wins series 4 – 3

==== (E4) Barrie Colts vs. (E5) Kingston Frontenacs ====
March 18	Barrie Colts	6 – 4	Kingston Frontenacs	Barrie Molson Centre

March 20	Kingston Frontenacs	0 – 2	Barrie Colts	Kingston Memorial Centre

March 21	Barrie Colts	5 – 4	Kingston Frontenacs	Barrie Molson Centre

March 23	Kingston Frontenacs	6 – 5	OT	Barrie Colts	Kingston Memorial Centre

March 25	Barrie Colts	2 – 1	OT	Kingston Frontenacs	Barrie Molson Centre

Barrie wins series 4 – 1

==== (E3) Mississauga IceDogs vs. (E6) Oshawa Generals ====
March 19	Mississauga IceDogs	3 – 0	Oshawa Generals	Hershey Centre
3:42 - Lukas Grauwiler (1)		First period	No scoring
16:20 - pp - Patrick O'Sullivan (1)		Second period	No scoring
19:13 - en - Tomislav Zanoški (1)		Third period	No scoring
David Shantz (15 saves / 15 shots)		Goalie stats	Dan Turple (38 saves / 40 shots)

March 21	Oshawa Generals	1 – 0	Mississauga IceDogs	Oshawa Civic Auditorium
No scoring		First period	No scoring
Justin Donati (1) - pp - 8:19		Second period	No scoring
No scoring		Third period	No scoring
Dan Turple (29 saves / 29 shots)		Goalie stats	David Shantz (29 saves / 30 shots)

March 23	Mississauga IceDogs	2 – 5	Oshawa Generals	Hershey Centre
Richard Caughell (1) - 2:57		First period	9:56 - pp - Chris Hulit (1); 10:44 - Brandon McBride (1); 15:09 - Ben Eager (1)
No scoring		Second period	4:04 - sh - Chris Hulit (2); 13:08 - pp - Tyler Donati (1)
Adam Abraham (1) - 11:14		Third period	No scoring
David Shantz (5 saves / 8 shots); Doug Groenestege (18 saves / 20 shots)		Goalie stats	Dan Turple (26 saves / 28 shots)

March 24	Oshawa Generals	0 – 2	Mississauga IceDogs	Oshawa Civic Auditorium
No scoring		First period	No scoring
No scoring		Second period	Ryan Stokes (1) - 11:20; Chris Curran (1) - 12:33
No scoring		Third period	No scoring
Dan Turple (26 saves / 28 shots)		Goalie stats	David Shantz (22 saves / 22 shots)

March 26	Mississauga IceDogs	5 – 1	Oshawa Generals	Hershey Centre
10:39 - Chris Curran (2); 17:05 - pp - Lukas Grauwiler (2)		First period	No scoring
11:14 - Patrick O'Sullivan (2)		Second period	Scott Baker (1) - 12:35
12:14 - Chad Painchaud (1); 16:52 - Chris Bain (1)		Third period	No scoring
David Shantz (17 saves / 18 shots)		Goalie stats	Dan Turple (24 saves / 29 shots)

March 29	Oshawa Generals	3 – 2	2OT	Mississauga IceDogs	Oshawa Civic Auditorium
No scoring		First period		Tomislav Zanoški (2) - 0:50
5:16 - Chris Hulit (3)		Second period		No scoring
1:47 - Tobias Whelan (1)		Third period		Dan Rudisuela (1) - 19:37
3:29 - Ben Eager (2)		Second overtime period		No scoring
Dan Turple (53 saves / 55 shots)		Goalie stats		David Shantz (44 saves / 47 shots)

March 30	Mississauga IceDogs	6 – 1	Oshawa Generals	Hershey Centre
8:17 - pp - Tomislav Zanoški (2); 11:09 - Chris Bain (2); 11:49 - Lukas Grauwiler (3)		First period	Tobias Whelan (2) - 17:21
No scoring		Second period	No scoring
1:18 - Brad Efthimiou (1); 5:34 - Anthony Butera (1); 19:23 - Mark O'Leary (1)		Third period	No scoring
David Shantz (22 saves / 23 shots)		Goalie stats	Dan Turple (28 saves / 34 shots)

Mississauga wins series 4 – 3

==== (W1) London Knights vs. (W8) Windsor Spitfires ====
March 19	London Knights	5 – 0	Windsor Spitfires	John Labatt Centre
No scoring		First period	No scoring
0:41 - Trevor Kell (1)		Second period	No scoring
4:52 - Danny Richmond (1); 5:30 - Scott Sheppard (1); 10:50 - Danny Richmond (2); 18:14 - Trevor Kell (2)		Third period	No scoring
Gerald Coleman (36 saves / 36 shots)		Goalie stats	Matt Anthony (28 saves / 33 shots)

March 21	Windsor Spitfires	6 – 10	London Knights	Windsor Arena
John Scott Dickson (1) - pp - 4:52; John Scott Dickson (2) - 10:54		First period	6:19 - pp - Rob Schremp (1); 14:46 - pp - Danny Bois (1); 16:34 - pp - Rob Schremp (2)
Mitch Maunu (1) - pp - 8:38; Paul Bortignon (1) - pp - 10:39; Rob Hennigar (1) - pp - 16:57; John Scott Dickson (3) - pp - 18:50		Second period	0:33 - Dylan Hunter (1); 7:34 - sh - Danny Richmond (3); 9:17 - Rick Steadman (1); 16:44 - sh - Brandon Prust (1)
No scoring		Third period	5:30 - pp - Dylan Hunter (2); 7:57 - Rick Steadman (2); 15:07 - Trevor Kell (3)
Matt Anthony (13 saves / 18 shots); Kyle Knechtel (19 saves / 24 shots)		Goalie stats	Gerald Coleman (23 saves / 29 shots)

March 23	London Knights	5 – 1	Windsor Spitfires	John Labatt Centre

March 25	Windsor Spitfires	1 – 8	London Knights	Windsor Arena

London wins series 4 – 0

==== (W2) Sarnia Sting vs. (W7) Erie Otters ====
March 19	Sarnia Sting	3 – 4	OT	Erie Otters	Sarnia Sports and Entertainment Centre

March 20	Sarnia Sting	3 – 2	Erie Otters	Sarnia Sports and Entertainment Centre

March 23	Erie Otters	7 – 2	Sarnia Sting	Tullio Arena

March 24	Erie Otters	3 – 2	Sarnia Sting	Tullio Arena

March 25	Sarnia Sting	2 – 3	Erie Otters	Sarnia Sports and Entertainment Centre

Erie wins series 4 – 1

==== (W4) Kitchener Rangers vs. (E5) Erie Otters ====
March 19	Kitchener Rangers	2 – 3	Plymouth Whalers	Kitchener Memorial Auditorium

March 20	Plymouth Whalers	6 – 3	Kitchener Rangers	Compuware Arena

March 22	Kitchener Rangers	5 – 4	Plymouth Whalers	Kitchener Memorial Auditorium

March 24	Plymouth Whalers	2 – 0	Kitchener Rangers	Compuware Arena

March 26	Kitchener Rangers	0 – 5	Plymouth Whalers	Kitchener Memorial Auditorium

Plymouth wins series 4 – 1

==== (W3) Guelph Storm vs. (W6) Owen Sound Attack ====
March 19	Guelph Storm	4 – 2	Owen Sound Attack	Guelph Sports and Entertainment Centre
4:38 - pp - Ryan Callahan (1)		First period	No scoring
0:52 - sh - Daniel Paille (1)		Second period	Mike Angelidis (1) - 1:42
3:31 - Ryan Callahan (2); 9:00 - Martin St. Pierre (1)		Third period	André Deveaux (1) - 7:15
Adam Dennis (19 saves / 21 shots)		Goalie stats	Robert Gherson (28 saves / 32 shots)

March 20	Owen Sound Attack	3 – 5	Guelph Storm	Harry Lumley Bayshore Community Centre
Patrick Jarrett (1) - pp - 10:52		First period	13:49 - pp - Jakub Koreis (1)
Adam Smyth (1) - 15:34; Patrick Jarrett (2) - 18:40		Second period	17:15 - Kevin Klein (1)
No scoring		Third period	11:26 - Ryan Callahan (3); 12:46 - sh - Jakub Koreis (2); 17:54 - Jakub Koreis (3)
Robert Gherson (44 saves / 49 shots)		Goalie stats	Adam Dennis (18 saves / 21 shots)

March 23	Guelph Storm	0 – 2	Owen Sound Attack	Guelph Sports and Entertainment Centre
No scoring		First period	4:40 - Mike Angelidis (2)
No scoring		Second period	9:21 - André Deveaux (2)
No scoring		Third period	No scoring
Adam Dennis (20 saves / 22 shots)		Goalie stats	Robert Gherson (40 saves / 40 shots)

March 24	Owen Sound Attack	2 – 1	Guelph Storm	Harry Lumley Bayshore Community Centre
10:28 - pp - Jonathan Lehun (1); 19:35 - Patrick Jarrett (3)		First period	Daniel Girardi (1) - pp - 13:51
No scoring		Second period	No scoring
No scoring		Third period	No scoring
Robert Gherson (32 saves / 33 shots)		Goalie stats	Adam Dennis (8 saves / 10 shots); Danny Taylor (13 saves / 13 shots)

March 26	Guelph Storm	5 – 3	Owen Sound Attack	Guelph Sports and Entertainment Centre
4:51 - Ryan Callahan (4)		First period	Mike Angelidis (3) - 7:17
16:33 - Brett Trudell (1); 19:59 - Kevin Klein (2)		Second period	Patrick Jarrett (4) - 18:16
7:35 - Daniel Girardi (2); 19:20 - en - Brett Trudell (2)		Third period	Štefan Ružička (1) - pp - 0:44
Danny Taylor (18 saves / 21 shots)		Goalie stats	Robert Gherson (29 saves / 33 shots)

March 27	Owen Sound Attack	6 – 5	Guelph Storm	Harry Lumley Bayshore Community Centre
14:56 - Kevin Harvey (1)		First period	Brett Trudell (3) - pp - 16:28
4:14 - Patrick Jarrett (5); 5:08 - Patrick Jarrett (6)		Second period	Daniel Paille (2) - 8:06; Brett Trudell (4) - 12:28; Brett Trudell (5) - pp - 17:49
0:18 - pp - André Deveaux (3); 4:35 - pp - Mark Giordano (1); 12:29 - Mike Angelidis (4)		Third period	Martin St. Pierre (2) - pp - 10:52
Robert Gherson (30 saves / 35 shots)		Goalie stats	Danny Taylor (23 saves / 29 shots)

March 30	Guelph Storm	3 – 1	Owen Sound Attack	Guelph Sports and Entertainment Centre
No scoring		First period	No scoring
12:14 - Ryan Callahan (5)		Second period	No scoring
0:55 - Daniel Paille (3); 18:57 - Daniel Paille (4)		Third period	Bobby Ryan (1) - 10:54
Adam Dennis (25 saves / 26 shots)		Goalie stats	Robert Gherson (49 saves / 52 shots)

Guelph wins series 4 – 3

=== Conference semifinals ===
Eastern conference

Toronto (1) vs. Brampton (7)
Date	Away	Home
April 2	Brampton 2	4 Toronto
April 4	Toronto 3	2 Brampton
April 6	Brampton 0	2 Toronto
April 8	Toronto 3	5 Brampton
April 9	Brampton 0	3 Toronto
Toronto wins series 4–1

Mississauga (3) vs. Barrie (4)
Date	Away	Home	
April 1	Mississauga 3	5 Barrie	
April 4	Barrie 1	2 Mississauga	OT
April 6	Barrie 3	2 Mississauga	OT
April 8	Mississauga 4	0 Barrie	
April 9	Barrie 2	0 Mississauga	
April 11	Mississauga 4	3 Barrie	
April 12	Barrie 1	Mississauga 4	
Mississauga wins series 4–3

Western conference

London (1) vs. Erie (7)
Date	Away	Home
March 31	Erie 2	6 London
April 3	London 5	1 Erie
April 5	Erie 3	6 London
April 7	London 4	1 Erie
London wins series 4–0

Guelph (3) vs. Plymouth (5)
Date	Away	Home	
April 2	Plymouth 0	4 Guelph	
April 3	Guelph 4	1 Plymouth	
April 5	Plymouth 2	3 Guelph	OT
April 7	Guelph 5	1 Plymouth	
Guelph wins series 4–0

=== Conference finals ===
Eastern conference

Toronto (1) vs. Mississauga (3)
Date	Away	Home	
April 14	Mississauga 0	3 Toronto	
April 16	Toronto 0	2 Mississauga	
April 18	Mississauga 3	4 Toronto	
April 21	Toronto 0	3 Mississauga	
April 23	Mississauga 3	2 Toronto	OT
April 25	Toronto 2	4 Mississauga	
Mississauga wins series 4–2

Western conference

London (1) vs. Guelph (3)
Date	Away	Home	
April 13	Guelph 4	2 London	
April 15	London 3	2 Guelph	OT
April 16	Guelph 4	3 London	
April 18	London 2	5 Guelph	
April 22	Guelph 1	2 London	OT
April 23	London 5	2 Guelph	
April 26	Guelph 6	3 London	
Guelph wins series 4–3

=== J. Ross Robertson Cup finals ===
Guelph (3) vs. Mississauga (3)
Date	Away	Home
April 28	Mississauga 1	4 Guelph
April 29	Guelph 2	1 Mississauga
May 3	Mississauga 4	6 Guelph
May 5	Guelph 5	1 Mississauga
Guelph wins series 4–0

=== J. Ross Robertson Cup Champions Roster ===
2003-04 Guelph Storm
Goaltenders: (Canada) 1 – Danny Taylor; (Canada) 28 – Adam Dennis	Defencemen: (United States) 4 – Mick Okrzesik; (Canada) 5 – Dan Girardi; (Canada) 6 – Kevin Klein; (Canada) 7 – Ryan Parent; (Canada) 8 – George Bradley; (Canada) 10 – Niko Tuomi – C; (Canada) 22 – Ryan Card	Wingers: (Canada) 11 – Mark Versteeg-Lytwyn; (Canada) 12 – Todd Cooper; (United States) 14 – Cam Janssen; (Canada) 15 – Steve Zmudczynski; (Canada) 17 – Brent Trudell; (Canada) 19 – Mike McLean; (Canada) 20 – Shane Hart; (United States) 24 – Ryan Callahan	Centres: (Canada) 9 – Martin St. Pierre - C; (Canada) 16 – Daniel Paille; (Canada) 23 – Matt Ryan; (Czech Republic) 29 – Jakub Koreis; (Canada) 32 – Ryan Kitchen; Coach: (Canada) Shawn Camp; General Manager: (Canada) Dave Barr

== All-Star teams ==
=== First team ===
- Corey Locke, Centre, Ottawa 67's
- Wojtek Wolski, Left Wing, Brampton Battalion
- Corey Perry, Right Wing, London Knights
- James Wisniewski, Defence, Plymouth Whalers
- Dennis Wideman, Defence, London Knights
- Paulo Colaiacovo, Goaltender, Barrie Colts
- Dale Hunter, Coach, London Knights

=== Second team ===
- Jeff Carter, Centre, Sault Ste. Marie Greyhounds
- Scott Dobben, Left Wing, Sault Ste. Marie Greyhounds
- Stefan Ruzicka, Right Wing, Owen Sound Attack
- Andre Benoit, Defence, Kitchener Rangers
- Jeremy Swanson, Defence, Barrie Colts
- Patrick Ehelechner, Goaltender, Sault Ste. Marie Greyhounds
- Greg Gilbert, Coach, Mississauga IceDogs

=== Third team ===
- Martin St. Pierre, Centre, Guelph Storm
- Dylan Hunter, Left Wing, London Knights
- Dave Bolland, Right Wing, London Knights
- Chris Campoli, Defence, Erie Otters
- Kevin Klein, Defence, Guelph Storm
- David Shantz, Goaltender, Mississauga IceDogs
- Shawn Camp, Coach, Guelph Storm

== CHL Canada/Russia Series ==
In the RE/MAX Canada-Russia Challenge, the OHL All-stars defeated the Russian Selects 7–1 at London, Ontario, on November 17, and the OHL All-stars defeated the Russian Selects 4–0 at Sarnia, Ontario, on November 19.

== Awards ==
J. Ross Robertson Cup:	Guelph Storm
Hamilton Spectator Trophy:	London Knights
Bobby Orr Trophy:	Mississauga IceDogs
Wayne Gretzky Trophy:	Guelph Storm
Leyden Trophy:	Ottawa 67's
Emms Trophy:	Toronto St. Michael's Majors
Holody Trophy:	London Knights
Bumbacco Trophy:	Sarnia Sting
Red Tilson Trophy:	Corey Locke, Ottawa 67's
Eddie Powers Memorial Trophy:	Corey Locke, Ottawa 67's
Matt Leyden Trophy:	Dale Hunter, London Knights
Jim Mahon Memorial Trophy:	Corey Perry, London Knights
Max Kaminsky Trophy:	James Wisniewski, Plymouth Whalers
OHL Goaltender of the Year:	Paulo Colaiacovo, Barrie Colts
Jack Ferguson Award:	John Hughes, Belleville Bulls
Dave Pinkney Trophy:	Ryan MacDonald and Gerald Coleman, London Knights
OHL Executive of the Year:	Mark Hunter, London Knights
Emms Family Award:	Bryan Little, Barrie Colts
F. W. "Dinty" Moore Trophy:	Ryan MacDonald, London Knights
Dan Snyder Memorial Trophy:	Chris Campoli, Erie Otters
William Hanley Trophy:	Andre Benoit, Kitchener Rangers
Leo Lalonde Memorial Trophy:	Martin St. Pierre, Guelph Storm
Bobby Smith Trophy:	Scott Lehman, Toronto St. Michael's Majors
Tim Adams Memorial Trophy:	Harrison Reed, York Simcoe Express
Wayne Gretzky 99 Award:	Martin St. Pierre, Guelph Storm

== 2004 OHL Priority Selection ==
On May 1, 2004, the OHL conducted the 2004 Ontario Hockey League Priority Selection. The Belleville Bulls held the first overall pick in the draft, and selected John Hughes from the Whitby Wildcats. Hughes was awarded the Jack Ferguson Award, awarded to the top pick in the draft.

Below are the players who were selected in the first round of the 2004 Ontario Hockey League Priority Selection.

#	Player	Nationality	OHL Team	Hometown	Minor Team
1	John Hughes (RW)	Canada	Belleville Bulls	Whitby, Ontario	Whitby Wildcats
2	Matt Corrente (D)	Canada	Saginaw Spirit	Mississauga, Ontario	Vaughan Vipers
3	Jordan Staal (C)	Canada	Peterborough Petes	Thunder Bay, Ontario	Thunder Bay Kings
4	Ryan McInerney (C)	Canada	Sault Ste. Marie Greyhounds	Oakville, Ontario	Milton IceHawks
5	Ryan McDonough (C)	Canada	Sudbury Wolves	Toronto, Ontario	North York Jr. Canadiens
6	John Degray (D)	Canada	Brampton Battalion	Markham, Ontario	Richmond Hill Stars
7	Cory McGillis (LW)	Canada	Windsor Spitfires	Coniston, Ontario	Sudbury Nickel Barons
8	James Delory (D)	Canada	Oshawa Generals	Newmarket, Ontario	York-Simcoe Express
9	Ben Shutron (D)	Canada	Kingston Frontenacs	Ottawa, Ontario	Richmond Hill Stars
10	Matt Lahey (RW)	Canada	Ottawa 67's	Oshawa, Ontario	Oshawa Kinsmen
11	Brett MacLean (LW)	Canada	Erie Otters	Port Elgin, Ontario	Grey-Bruce Highlanders
12	Payton Liske (LW)	Canada	Owen Sound Attack	Fonthill, Ontario	Welland Jr. Canadians
13	John Armstrong (C)	Canada	Plymouth Whalers	Markham, Ontario	North York Jr. Canadiens
14	Justin Azevedo (C)	Canada	Kitchener Rangers	West Elgin, Ontario	Chatham Maroons
15	Nathan Martine (D)	Canada	Barrie Colts	Port Colborne, Ontario	Port Colborne Pirates
16	Kody Musselman (RW)	Canada	Sarnia Sting	Whitby, Ontario	Oshawa Legionaires
17	Dustin Jeffrey (C)	Canada	Mississauga IceDogs	Courtright, Ontario	Lambton Jr. Sting
18	Justin DiBenedetto (LW)	Canada	Toronto St. Michael's Majors	Maple, Ontario	Toronto Marlboros
19	Michael Caruso (D)	Canada	Guelph Storm	Mississauga, Ontario	Mississauga Reps
20	Steven Ferry (D)	Canada	London Knights	Richmond Hill, Ontario	Richmond Hill Stars

== 2004 CHL Import Draft ==
On June 30, 2004, the Canadian Hockey League conducted the 2004 CHL Import Draft, in which teams in all three CHL leagues participate in. The Owen Sound Attack held the first pick in the draft by a team in the OHL, and selected Andrej Sekera from Slovakia with their selection.

Below are the players who were selected in the first round by Ontario Hockey League teams in the 2004 CHL Import Draft.

#	Player	Nationality	OHL Team	Hometown	Minor Team
2	Andrej Sekera (D)	Slovakia	Owen Sound Attack	Prievidza, Slovakia	Dukla Trenčín Jr.
5	Jakub Kindl (D)	Czech Republic	Kitchener Rangers	Šumperk, Czech Republic	HC Pardubice Jr.
8	Michal Birner (LW)	Czech Republic	Barrie Colts	Litoměřice, Czech Republic	Slavia Praha Jr.
11	Marek Kvapil (RW)	Slovakia	Saginaw Spirit	Ilava, Slovakia	Slavia Praha Jr.
14	Peter Olvecky (C/LW)	Slovakia	Sudbury Wolves	Nové Zámky, Slovakia	Dukla Trenčín Jr.
17	Tomas Stryncl (D)	Czech Republic	Brampton Battalion	Karlovy Vary, Czech Republic	HC Karlovy Vary Jr.
20	No selection made		Windsor Spitfires		
23	Jakub Petruzalek (C/RW)	Czech Republic	Ottawa 67's	Litvínov, Czech Republic	Verva Litvínov
26	Radek Smolenak (LW)	Czech Republic	Kingston Frontenacs	Prague, Czech Republic	HC Kladno Jr.
29	Lukas Kaspar (RW)	Czech Republic	Ottawa 67's	Litvínov, Czech Republic	Verva Litvínov
32	Vladimir Tyufyakov (LW)	Russia	Erie Otters	Novosibirsk, Russia	Sibir Novosibirsk U18
35	Lubomir Stach (D)	Czech Republic	Belleville Bulls	Vsetín, Czech Republic	HC Vsetín Jr.
38	Michal Kolarz (D)	Czech Republic	Plymouth Whalers	Havířov, Czech Republic	HC Vítkovice Ostrave Jr.
41	Philip Ogleznev (LW)	Ukraine	Sarnia Sting	Kharkiv, Ukraine	Elektrostal Elemash Junior
44	Niko Vainio (D)	Finland	Peterborough Petes	Helsinki, Finland	Jokerit Jr.
47	Andrey Plekhanov (D)	Russia	Sarnia Sting	Nizhnekamsk, Russia	Neftekhimik Nizhnekamsk
50	Ville Peltosuo (D)	Finland	Mississauga IceDogs	Helsinki, Finland	Kiekko Vantaa B
52	Peter Regin (C)	Denmark	Toronto St. Michael's Majors	Herning, Denmark	Herning Blue Fox
54	Jaromir Florian (LW)	Czech Republic	Guelph Storm	Brno, Czech Republic	HC Kometa Brno Jr.
56	Mathis Olimb (C)	Norway	London Knights	Oslo, Norway	Manglerud Star

== See also ==
- List of OHA Junior A standings
- List of OHL seasons
- 2004 Memorial Cup
- 2004 NHL entry draft
- 2003 in sports
- 2004 in sports

Preceded by 2002–03 OHL season	OHL seasons	Succeeded by 2004–05 OHL season
