= Colaiacovo =

Colaiacovo is an Italian surname. Notable people with the surname include:

- Carlo Colaiacovo (born 1983), Canadian ice hockey player
- Paulo Colaiacovo (born 1983), Canadian ice hockey player
