= Martin St. Pierre (ice hockey) =

Canadian-Kazakhstani ice hockey player

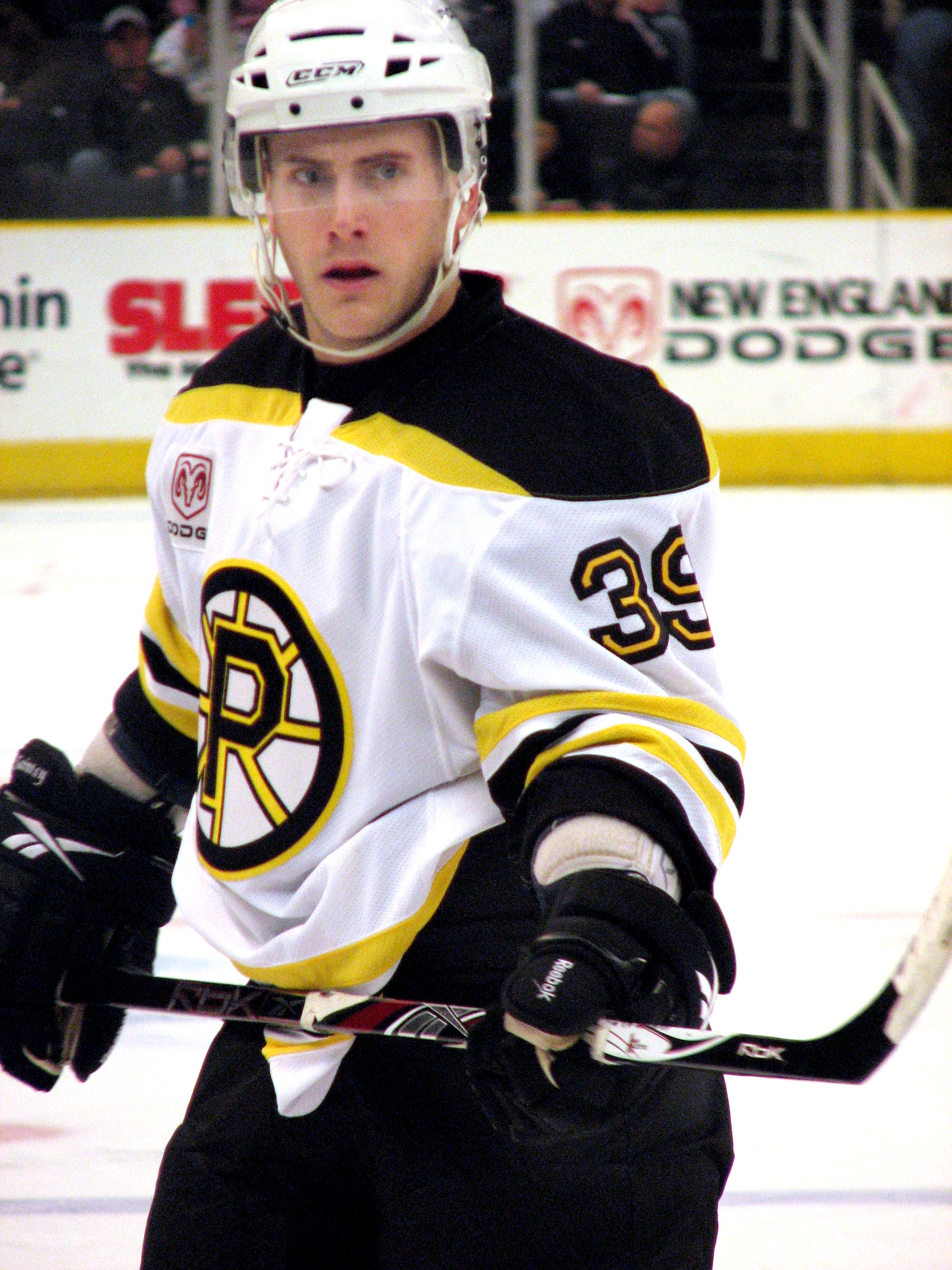
- Born: 11 August 1983 (age 43) Embrun, Ontario, Canada
- Height: 5 ft 9 in (175 cm)
- Weight: 187 lb (85 kg; 13 st 5 lb)
- Position: Centre
- Shot: Left
- Played for: Chicago Blackhawks; Khimik Moscow Oblast; Boston Bruins; Ottawa Senators; HC Neftekhimik Nizhnekamsk; Oulun Kärpät; EC Red Bull Salzburg; Montreal Canadiens; KHL Medveščak Zagreb; Lausanne HC; Barys Astana; Admiral Vladivostok; Kunlun Red Star; Sheffield Steelers; DVTK Jegesmedvék; HC Slovan Bratislava; Dunaújvárosi Acélbikák
- National team: Kazakhstan
- NHL draft: Undrafted
- Playing career: 2004–2021

Joseph Louis Martin St. Pierre (born 11 August 1983) is a Canadian-Kazakhstani former professional ice hockey forward who last played for Dunaújvárosi Acélbikák in the Erste Liga. St. Pierre was previously most recently with HC Slovan Bratislava of the Slovak Tipsport Liga.

== Playing career ==
As a youth, St. Pierre played in the 1997 Quebec International Pee-Wee Hockey Tournament with a minor ice hockey team from Hawkesbury, Ontario.

Undrafted, St. Pierre was a graduate of the Guelph Storm of the Ontario Hockey League, where he won the Wayne Gretzky Trophy in 2004. St. Pierre then played his first professional season in 2004–05 with the Greenville Grrrowl of the ECHL and the Edmonton Roadrunners of the AHL.

On 3 November 2005, Martin was signed as a free agent by the Chicago Blackhawks and was assigned to the Norfolk Admirals of the AHL. He made his NHL debut with the Blackhawks in the 2005–06 season. St. Pierre spent the majority of the next two seasons in the AHL with the Admirals and the Rockford IceHogs. He also had a brief spell in the Russian Super League prior to the 2007–08 season with Khimik Mytishchi.

After appearing in only 21 games with the Blackhawks through parts of 3 seasons, St. Pierre was traded to the Boston Bruins for Pascal Pelletier on 24 July 2008. St. Pierre was then assigned to the Bruins affiliate, the Providence Bruins. On 20 December 2008, Martin received his first call-up to the Bruins. He played his first game for Boston, recording an assist, in a 6-3 win over the St. Louis Blues on 21 December 2008. On 30 December 2008 St. Pierre scored his first Bruins goal, in a 5-2 Bruins road win over the Pittsburgh Penguins as a shorthanded goal.

On 1 July 2009, St. Pierre signed a one-year contract with the Ottawa Senators. He was assigned to the Binghamton Senators. He was called up to Ottawa and played his first game for Ottawa against the Florida Panthers on 9 January 2010.

On 6 June 2010, St. Pierre left the NHL for Europe signing a one-year contract with Russian team, HC Neftekhimik Nizhnekamsk, of the KHL.

On 11 July 2011, St. Pierre signed a one-year contract with the Columbus Blue Jackets He was assigned to the Blue Jackets' AHL affiliate, the Springfield Falcons, where he would spend the remainder of the season, playing in 73 games and leading the team in points, recording 11 goals and 53 assists. On 2 July 2012, St. Pierre signed a contract to return with the Blackhawks AHL affiliate, the Rockford IceHogs.

On 6 July 2013, St. Pierre signed a one-year two-way deal as a free agent with the Montreal Canadiens. In the 2013-14 season, St. Pierre was originally assigned to the Canadiens AHL affiliate, the Hamilton Bulldogs. He remained with the Bulldogs for the majority of the year, playing in a solitary game with the Canadiens in his one recall to the NHL.

On 24 July 2014, St. Pierre returned to Europe, agreeing to a one-year deal with Croatian club, KHL Medveščak Zagreb, of the KHL. He finished the season at Lausanne HC.

On 9 August 2015, St. Pierre signed a contract with KHL club Barys Astana of Kazakhstan. He later accepted naturalised citizenship with Kazakhstan and represented the country at the 2017 IIHF Division I World Championships.

In his third and final season under contract with Astana in 2017–18, St. Pierre was traded by the club to Russian outfit, Admiral Vladivostok in exchange for James Wright on 24 November 2017.

In July 2019, St. Pierre signed with the Sheffield Steelers of the British Elite Ice Hockey League, however he was released by the club just two months later.

After spells in 2019-20 with DVTK Jegesmedvék and HC Slovan Bratislava, St. Pierre moved to Hungary for the 2020-21 season to sign with Dunaújvárosi Acélbikák.

On March 16, 2021, St. Pierre announced his retirement from hockey.

== Career statistics ==
=== Regular season and playoffs ===
			Regular season					Playoffs
Season	Team	League	GP	G	A	Pts	PIM	GP	G	A	Pts	PIM
1999–2000	Hawkesbury Hawks	CJHL	55	30	45	75	77	—	—	—	—	—
2000–01	Guelph Storm	OHL	68	20	49	69	40	4	0	0	0	4
2001–02	Guelph Storm	OHL	66	32	53	85	68	9	3	9	12	12
2002–03	Guelph Storm	OHL	55	11	45	56	74	11	5	11	16	4
2003–04	Guelph Storm	OHL	68	45	65	110	95	22	8	27	35	20
2004–05	Greenville Grrrowl	ECHL	45	14	39	53	55	7	2	5	7	6
2004–05	Edmonton Roadrunners	AHL	18	4	3	7	8	—	—	—	—	—
2005–06	Norfolk Admirals	AHL	77	23	50	73	98	4	0	3	3	2
2005–06	Chicago Blackhawks	NHL	2	0	0	0	0	—	—	—	—	—
2006–07	Norfolk Admirals	AHL	65	27	72	99	100	6	0	1	1	6
2006–07	Chicago Blackhawks	NHL	14	1	3	4	8	—	—	—	—	—
2007–08	Khimik Moscow Oblast	RSL	14	1	6	7	16	—	—	—	—	—
2007–08	Rockford IceHogs	AHL	69	21	67	88	80	12	2	12	14	12
2007–08	Chicago Blackhawks	NHL	5	0	0	0	0	—	—	—	—	—
2008–09	Providence Bruins	AHL	61	15	51	66	58	16	5	11	16	26
2008–09	Boston Bruins	NHL	14	2	2	4	4	—	—	—	—	—
2009–10	Binghamton Senators	AHL	77	24	48	72	50	—	—	—	—	—
2009–10	Ottawa Senators	NHL	3	0	0	0	0	—	—	—	—	—
2010–11	Neftekhimik Nizhnekamsk	KHL	8	1	1	2	8	—	—	—	—	—
2010–11	Kärpät	SM-l	27	8	6	14	6	—	—	—	—	—
2010–11	EC Red Bull Salzburg	EBEL	11	3	9	12	18	18	2	10	12	20
2011–12	Springfield Falcons	AHL	73	11	53	64	56	—	—	—	—	—
2012–13	Rockford IceHogs	AHL	76	26	33	59	59	—	—	—	—	—
2013–14	Hamilton Bulldogs	AHL	71	10	38	48	48	—	—	—	—	—
2013–14	Montreal Canadiens	NHL	1	0	0	0	0	—	—	—	—	—
2014–15	KHL Medveščak Zagreb	KHL	57	10	23	33	58	—	—	—	—	—
2014–15	Lausanne HC	NLA	3	1	0	1	0	1	0	0	0	0
2015–16	Barys Astana	KHL	55	7	17	24	32	—	—	—	—	—
2016–17	Barys Astana	KHL	54	11	20	31	22	10	3	3	6	10
2017–18	Barys Astana	KHL	30	6	18	24	4	—	—	—	—	—
2017–18	Admiral Vladivostok	KHL	10	0	4	4	4	—	—	—	—	—
2018–19	Kunlun Red Star	KHL	27	4	8	12	10	—	—	—	—	—
2019–20	Sheffield Steelers	EIHL	5	1	1	2	4	—	—	—	—	—
2019–20	DVTK Jegesmedvék	SVK	17	4	9	13	28	—	—	—	—	—
2019–20	HC Slovan Bratislava	SVK	21	4	14	18	18	—	—	—	—	—
2020–21	Dunaújvárosi Acélbikák	Erste Liga	31	6	20	26	—	—	—	—	—	—
AHL totals			587	161	415	576	557	38	7	27	34	46
NHL totals			39	3	5	8	12	—	—	—	—	—
KHL totals			241	39	91	130	138	10	3	3	6	10

=== International ===
Year	Team	Event	Result	GP	G	A	Pts	PIM
2017	Kazakhstan	WC D1A	19th	5	1	2	3	6
2019	Kazakhstan	WC D1A	17th	5	0	3	3	4
Senior totals				10	1	5	6	10

== Awards and honours ==
Award	Year
OHL
Second All-Rookie Team	2001
Leo Lalonde Memorial Trophy	2004
Third All-Star Team	2004
Wayne Gretzky Trophy	2004
AHL
All-Star Game	2006, 2007, 2008, 2010, 2013
All-Rookie Team	2006
First All-Star Team	2007
Second All-Star Team	2008
