= Jakub Koreis =

Czech ice hockey player (born 1984)

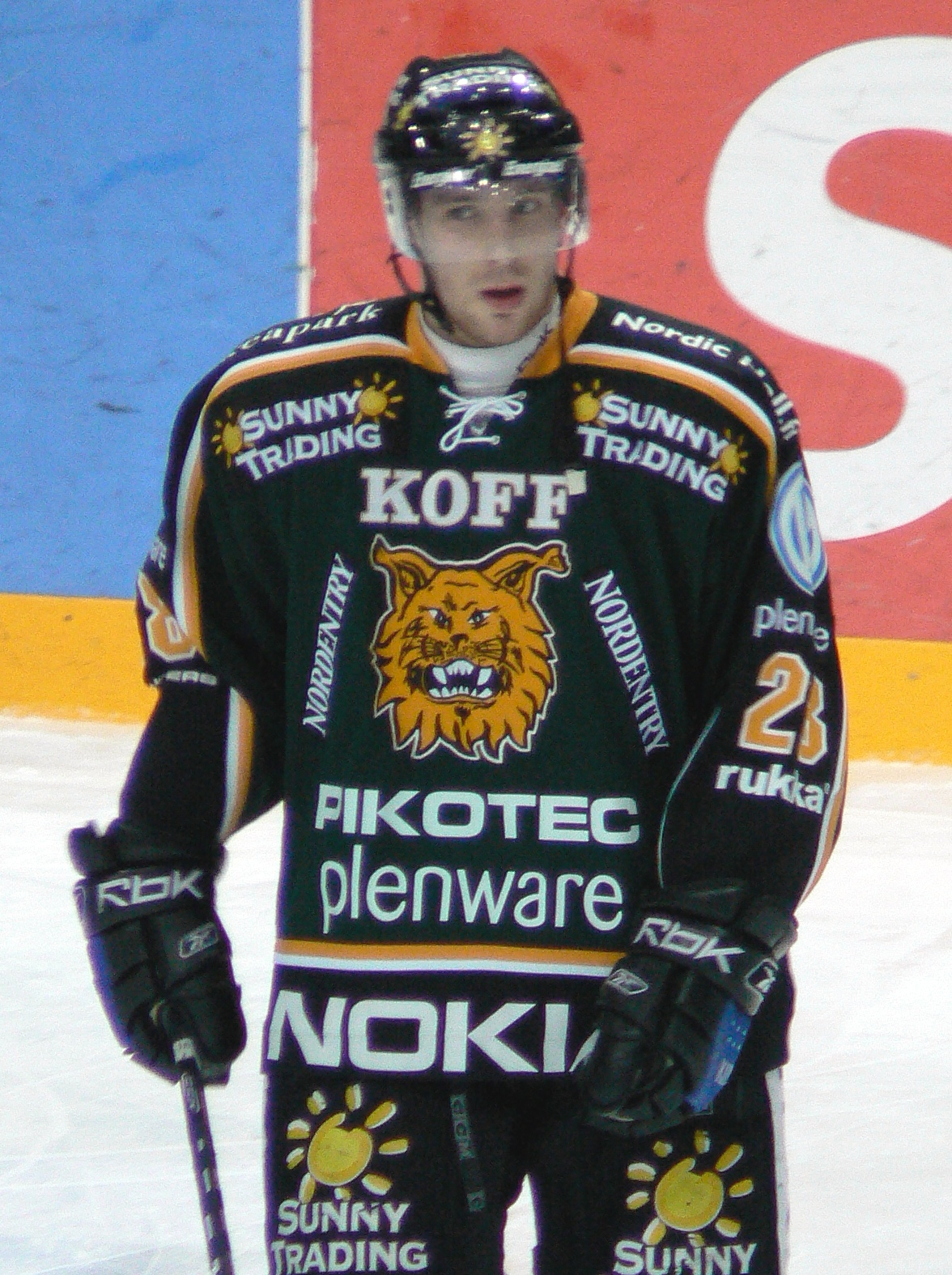
- Born: June 26, 1984 (age 41) Plzeň, Czechoslovakia
- Height: 6 ft 3 in (191 cm)
- Weight: 227 lb (103 kg; 16 st 3 lb)
- Position: Centre
- Shot: Left
- Played for: HC Plzeň; Utah Grizzlies; San Antonio Rampage; Ilves; HC Sparta Praha; EC KAC
- NHL draft: 19th overall, 2002; Phoenix Coyotes
- Playing career: 2001–2017

Jakub Koreis (born June 26, 1984) is a hockey commenter and a retired Czech professional ice hockey centre who used to play for HC Kometa Brno in the Czech Extraliga.

He was drafted in the first round, 19th overall, by the Phoenix Coyotes in the 2002 NHL entry draft. Whilst in the Coyotes system, Koreis played with American Hockey League affiliate, the San Antonio Rampage, before leaving North America at the end of his entry-level contract with the Coyotes unable to debut in the National Hockey League.

On September 3, 2014, Koreis signed a three-month trial contract with EC KAC of the Austrian Hockey League (EBEL). After only 6 games with Klagenfurt, Koreis opted to terminate his contract and return to former Czech club, HC Kometa Brno on October 7, 2014.

== Career statistics ==
=== Regular season and playoffs ===
			Regular season					Playoffs
Season	Team	League	GP	G	A	Pts	PIM	GP	G	A	Pts	PIM
2000–01	HC Keramika Plzeň	CZE U18	6	6	9	15	16	3	1	1	2	12
2000–01	HC Keramika Plzeň	CZE U20	34	6	11	17	48	—	—	—	—	—
2001–02	HC Keramika Plzeň	CZE U20	23	14	14	28	38	—	—	—	—	—
2001–02	HC Keramika Plzeň	ELH	20	3	0	3	10	—	—	—	—	—
2002–03	HC Keramika Plzeň	CZE U20	10	3	5	8	28	—	—	—	—	—
2002–03	HC Keramika Plzeň	ELH	23	1	6	7	8	—	—	—	—	—
2003–04	Guelph Storm	OHL	48	11	27	38	85	22	8	10	18	24
2004–05	Utah Grizzlies	AHL	79	5	6	11	96	—	—	—	—	—
2005–06	San Antonio Rampage	AHL	70	3	5	8	74	—	—	—	—	—
2006–07	San Antonio Rampage	AHL	77	6	19	25	70	—	—	—	—	—
2007–08	Ilves	SM-l	10	3	2	5	2	8	2	0	2	39
2008–09	HC Sparta Praha	ELH	36	2	4	6	61	11	3	1	4	16
2009–10	HC Sparta Praha	ELH	51	4	13	17	101	4	1	0	1	2
2010–11	HC Sparta Praha	ELH	44	3	5	8	67	—	—	—	—	—
2010–11	HC Kometa Brno	ELH	6	0	1	1	2	2	1	1	2	4
2011–12	HC Kometa Brno	ELH	51	3	7	10	75	18	0	2	2	10
2012–13	HC Kometa Brno	ELH	45	4	8	12	45	—	—	—	—	—
2013–14	HC Kometa Brno	ELH	38	4	7	11	36	18	2	6	8	18
2014–15	Klagenfurter AC	EBEL	6	1	0	1	4	—	—	—	—	—
2014–15	HC Kometa Brno	ELH	42	5	11	16	58	12	1	4	5	10
2015–16	HC Kometa Brno	ELH	37	2	6	8	36	4	0	0	0	0
2016–17	HC Škoda Plzeň	ELH	48	1	7	8	30	11	1	0	1	6
2021–22	KHL Meteor Třemošná	CZE.4	10	4	16	20	0	—	—	—	—	—
AHL totals			226	14	30	44	240	—	—	—	—	—
ELH totals			441	32	75	107	529	80	9	14	23	66

=== International ===
Year	Team	Event	GP	G	A	Pts	PIM
2002	Czech Republic	WJC18	8	1	2	3	6
2003	Czech Republic	WJC	6	0	0	0	0
2004	Czech Republic	WJC	6	0	3	3	0
Junior totals			20	1	5	6	6

Awards and achievements
Preceded by Fredrik Sjöström	Phoenix Coyotes first-round draft pick 2002	Succeeded by Ben Eager
