= Mike Angelidis =

Canadian ice hockey player

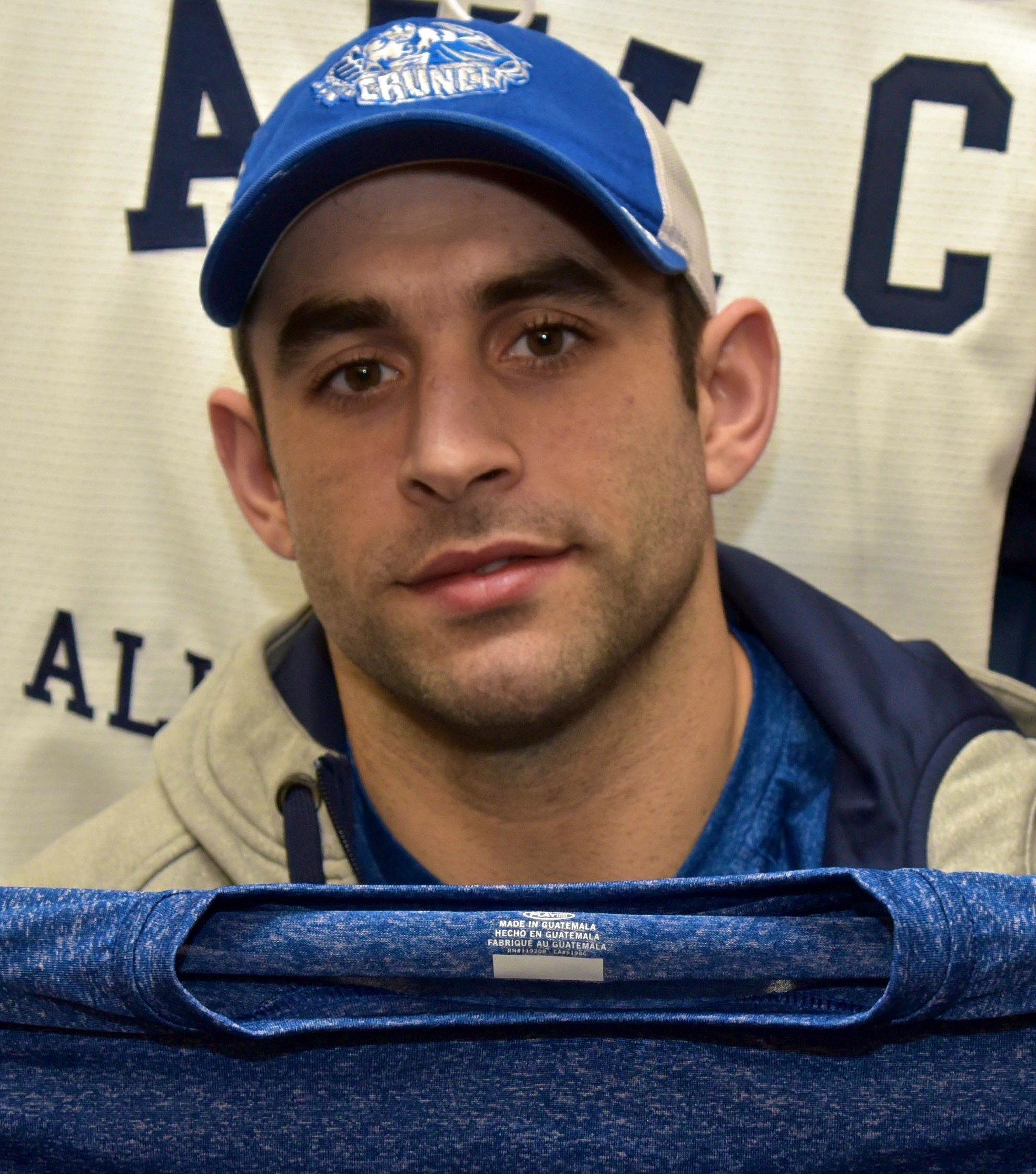
- Angelidis in 2016
- Born: June 27, 1985 (age 41) Woodbridge, Ontario, Canada
- Height: 6 ft 1 in (185 cm)
- Weight: 214 lb (97 kg; 15 st 4 lb)
- Position: Centre / Left wing
- Shot: Left
- Played for: Tampa Bay Lightning; HC Bolzano
- NHL draft: Undrafted
- Playing career: 2006–2018

Mike Angelidis (born June 27, 1985) is a Canadian former professional ice hockey centre who last played with HCB South Tyrol in the Austrian Hockey League (EBEL). He has formerly played in the National Hockey League (NHL) with the Tampa Bay Lightning.

== Playing career ==
Undrafted, Angelidis made his professional debut during the 2006–07 season playing in 24 games in the ECHL with the Florida Everblades, where he scored 10 goals and 18 points. He then joined the Albany River Rats of the American Hockey League (AHL), where he played 235 career games with the club, he scored 42 goals and 85 points and amassed 456 penalty minutes. In the 2008–09 season, Angelidis led the River Rats in penalty minutes with 142 and was also tied for fifth in goals with 15.

On August 3, 2010, Angelidis was signed as a free agent by the Tampa Bay Lightning. Angelidis scored his first career NHL goal in his first NHL game, on January 24, 2012, against Curtis Sanford of the Columbus Blue Jackets.

On March 12, 2015, Angelidis was recalled by the Lightning after the team suffered a series of injuries at forward. Prior to the recall, Angelidis appeared in 57 games with the AHL's Syracuse Crunch, scoring 17 goals and 33 points. On March 20, 2015, the Lightning announced that Angelidis had been reassigned to the Crunch. During his three-game stint with the Lightning, he recorded 12 penalty minutes, including from a pair of fighting majors against the Montreal Canadiens.

On June 30, 2015, the Lightning announced it had resigned Angelidis to a one-year, two-way contract. In addition to playing three games with the Lightning in the previous season, he also played in 64 games for the Crunch, scoring 20 goals and 38 points while serving as the team's captain, good for third on the team in goals and points; he also led the team with 138 penalty minutes. Angelidis has been serving as captain of the Crunch since the beginning of the 2012–13 season.

On January 5, 2016, having spent the majority of the season with the Crunch, Angelidis was named the captain of the 2016 AHL All Star Classic.

In the off-season, Angelidis left as a free agent after six seasons in the Lightning organization. Unable to sign an NHL contract, on August 8, 2016, Angelidis signed a one-year contract with the AHL's Stockton Heat, the AHL affiliate of the Calgary Flames. On October 18, 2016, the AHL announced that it had suspended Angelidis three games for an illegal check to the head of an opponent in a game against the San Jose Barracuda. Limited to 49 games through injury, Angelidis registered 7 goals and 19 points to help Stockton reach the 2017 Calder Cup playoffs.

On July 4, 2017, after spending the first 11 seasons of his professional career in North America, Angelidis signed his first contract abroad, agreeing to a one-year contract with Italian-based HC Bolzano of the Austrian Hockey League (EBEL). On June 27, 2018, Angelidis announced his retirement from professional hockey.

== Personal ==
Angelidis is of Macedonian heritage and is married to Lenna, with whom he has three children.

Angelidis' cousin, Jeff Angelidis (born 1977), also played professional hockey in both Europe and North America.

== Career statistics ==
			Regular season					Playoffs
Season	Team	League	GP	G	A	Pts	PIM	GP	G	A	Pts	PIM
2001–02	Thornhill Rattlers	OPJHL	44	18	11	29	101	—	—	—	—	—
2002–03	Owen Sound Attack	OHL	65	7	10	17	81	4	1	1	2	0
2003–04	Owen Sound Attack	OHL	66	9	9	18	118	7	4	1	5	4
2004–05	Owen Sound Attack	OHL	41	9	10	19	126	8	3	2	5	10
2005–06	Owen Sound Attack	OHL	68	53	25	78	167	11	5	9	14	38
2006–07	Florida Everblades	ECHL	24	10	8	18	54	—	—	—	—	—
2006–07	Albany River Rats	AHL	27	4	5	9	44	4	0	0	0	10
2007–08	Albany River Rats	AHL	74	11	16	27	151	7	0	2	2	6
2008–09	Albany River Rats	AHL	67	15	10	25	142	—	—	—	—	—
2009–10	Albany River Rats	AHL	67	12	12	24	119	8	2	4	6	12
2010–11	Norfolk Admirals	AHL	80	20	18	38	169	3	0	0	0	2
2011–12	Norfolk Admirals	AHL	54	14	13	27	135	18	1	5	6	35
2011–12	Tampa Bay Lightning	NHL	6	1	0	1	5	—	—	—	—	—
2012–13	Syracuse Crunch	AHL	71	11	13	24	158	18	2	4	6	49
2012–13	Tampa Bay Lightning	NHL	1	0	0	0	0	—	—	—	—	—
2013–14	Syracuse Crunch	AHL	75	12	21	33	161	—	—	—	—	—
2014–15	Syracuse Crunch	AHL	64	20	18	38	138	3	0	1	1	6
2014–15	Tampa Bay Lightning	NHL	3	0	0	0	12	—	—	—	—	—
2015–16	Syracuse Crunch	AHL	53	7	8	15	75	—	—	—	—	—
2015–16	Tampa Bay Lightning	NHL	4	1	0	1	5	—	—	—	—	—
2016–17	Stockton Heat	AHL	49	7	12	19	97	5	1	2	3	2
2017–18	HC Bolzano	EBEL	54	15	13	28	73	18	4	6	10	24
AHL totals			681	133	146	279	1389	66	6	18	24	122
NHL totals			14	2	0	2	22	—	—	—	—	—

== Awards and honors ==
Award	Year
AHL
Calder Cup (Norfolk Admirals)	2012
All-Star Game	2016
