= Fredrik Sjöström =

Swedish ice hockey player

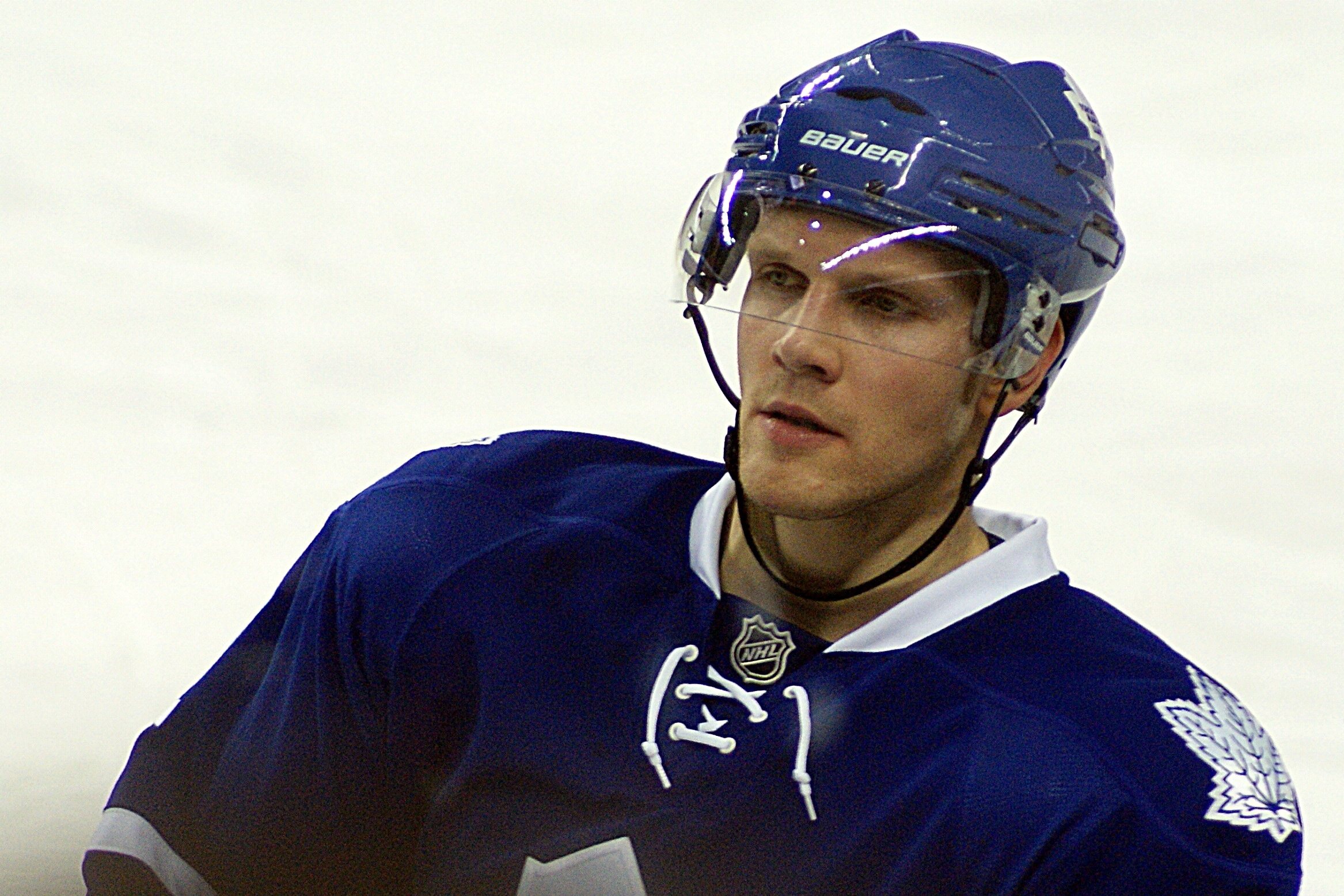
- Sjöström as a member of the Toronto Maple Leafs in 2010
- Born: May 6, 1983 (age 42) Färgelanda, Sweden
- Height: 6 ft 1 in (185 cm)
- Weight: 218 lb (99 kg; 15 st 8 lb)
- Position: Right wing
- Shot: Left
- Played for: Frölunda HC; Phoenix Coyotes; New York Rangers; Calgary Flames; Toronto Maple Leafs; Färjestad BK
- National team: Sweden
- NHL draft: 11th overall, 2001; Phoenix Coyotes
- Playing career: 2000–2013
- Website: Fredriksjostrom.se

Fredrik Per Oscar Sjöström (Swedish: [ˈfrěːdrɪk ˈɧø̂ːstrœm]; born May 6, 1983) is a Swedish former professional ice hockey winger, and is currently the general manager of Frölunda HC of the Swedish Hockey League (SHL). Sjöström was drafted by the Phoenix Coyotes in the 1st round (11th overall) during the 2001 NHL entry draft. He would also play for the New York Rangers, Calgary Flames, and Toronto Maple Leafs.

== Playing career ==
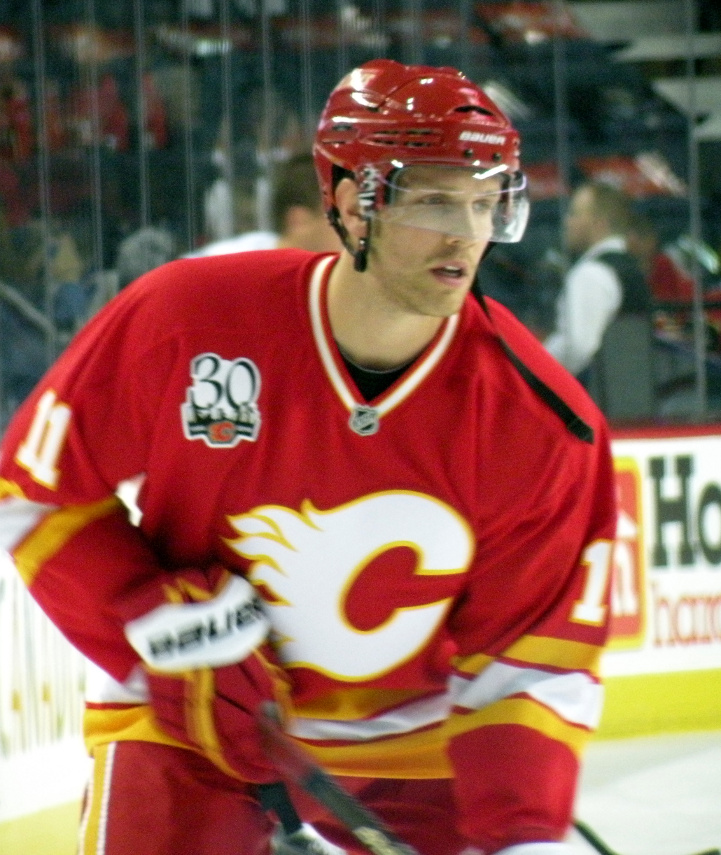
Sjöström during his tenure with the Flames.

Before being drafted into the NHL, Sjöström played for Frölunda HC in Sweden throughout the 2000-2001 season. After being drafted 11th overall in the 2001 NHL entry draft by the Phoenix Coyotes, Sjöström would move to North America to play for the Calgary Hitmen in the Western Hockey League (WHL).

During the 2003–04 season, Sjöström would split time between the Springfield Falcons in the American Hockey League (AHL) and the Phoenix Coyotes in the National Hockey League (NHL). He would make his NHL debut on November 30, 2003 against the Boston Bruins. Sjöström would score his first NHL goal and point on December 12, 2003 against the Edmonton Oilers.

Sjöström would spend the entire 2004–05 season playing in the AHL for the Utah Grizzlies before returning to the Phoenix Coyotes a season later.

On July 13, 2006, Sjöström signed a one-way, two-year contract extension worth $1.5 million with the Coyotes.

On October 11, 2007 Sjöström would score a hat trick in a 6–3 victory against the Nashville Predators. Later that season, Sjöström would be traded alongside Josh Gratton and David LeNeveu and a 5th round draft pick to the New York Rangers for Marcel Hossa and Al Montoya.

On July 1, 2009, Sjöström signed a two-year, $1.5 million contract with the Calgary Flames. Sjöström would struggle to produce on the Flames, only scoring a single goal and 5 assists in 46 games. On January 31, 2010, Sjöström would be a part of a multi-player trade to the Toronto Maple Leafs alongside Dion Phaneuf and Keith Aulie in exchange for Matt Stajan, Niklas Hagman, Ian White, and Jamal Mayers. Sjöström's struggles would continue with the Maple Leafs, only scoring a total of 10 points in his two seasons with the team.

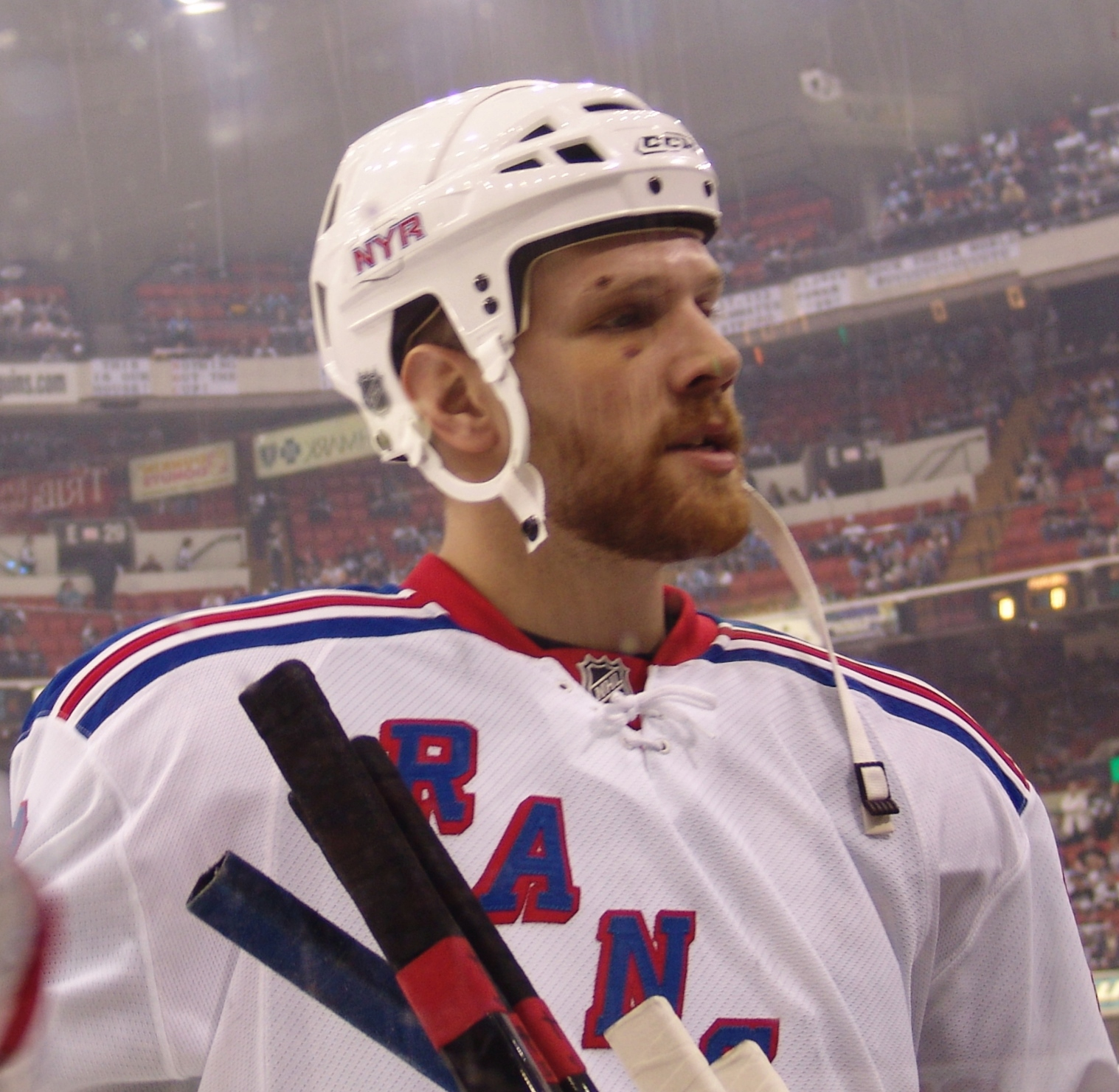
Sjöström in 2008 as a member of the New York Rangers.

In 2011, after his contract with the Toronto Maple Leafs expired after the conclusion of the 2010-11 season, Sjöström would return to Sweden and sign a one-year contract with Färjestad BK of the Elitserien. After playing 20 games with Färjestad BK, Sjöström would return to Frölunda HC, the team he played for 11 years prior.

Sjöström announced his retirement from professional hockey on August 29, 2013.

== Executive career ==
After retiring from playing, Sjöström moved directly into a scouting position with Frölunda for the 2013–14 season. He later was promoted to assistant general manager before taking over the general manager role with Frölunda midway through the 2015–16 season.

== International play ==
Sjöström played for Sweden in three world junior ice hockey championship. He made his debut for Sweden's men's team during the Euro Hockey Tour final against Finland, and was selected to play at the 2004 Men's World Ice Hockey Championships, where Tre Kronor won a silver medal.

== Career statistics ==
=== Regular season and playoffs ===
			Regular season					Playoffs
Season	Team	League	GP	G	A	Pts	PIM	GP	G	A	Pts	PIM
1999–2000	Modo Hockey	J18 Allsv	4	0	2	2	6	—	—	—	—	—
1999–2000	Modo Hockey	J20	14	4	4	8	2	—	—	—	—	—
2000–01	Västra Frölunda HC	J18 Allsv	—	—	—	—	—	4	1	2	3	6
2000–01	Västra Frölunda HC	J20	7	2	5	7	6	—	—	—	—	—
2000–01	Västra Frölunda HC	SEL	31	2	3	5	6	5	0	0	0	2
2001–02	Calgary Hitmen	WHL	58	19	31	50	51	4	1	1	2	8
2002–03	Calgary Hitmen	WHL	63	34	43	77	95	5	1	3	4	4
2002–03	Springfield Falcons	AHL	2	1	0	1	0	6	2	0	2	12
2003–04	Springfield Falcons	AHL	17	0	7	7	8	—	—	—	—	—
2003–04	Phoenix Coyotes	NHL	57	7	6	13	22	—	—	—	—	—
2004–05	Utah Grizzlies	AHL	80	14	24	38	57	—	—	—	—	—
2005–06	Phoenix Coyotes	NHL	75	6	17	23	42	—	—	—	—	—
2006–07	Phoenix Coyotes	NHL	78	9	9	18	48	—	—	—	—	—
2007–08	Phoenix Coyotes	NHL	51	10	9	19	14	—	—	—	—	—
2007–08	New York Rangers	NHL	18	2	0	2	8	10	0	1	1	2
2008–09	New York Rangers	NHL	79	7	6	13	30	7	0	1	1	0
2009–10	Calgary Flames	NHL	46	1	5	6	8	—	—	—	—	—
2009–10	Toronto Maple Leafs	NHL	19	2	3	5	4	—	—	—	—	—
2010–11	Toronto Maple Leafs	NHL	66	2	3	5	14	—	—	—	—	—
2011–12	Färjestad BK	SEL	20	1	4	5	10	—	—	—	—	—
2011–12	Frölunda HC	SEL	35	5	3	8	28	6	0	0	0	2
2012–13	Frölunda HC	SEL	50	5	5	10	16	1	0	0	0	0
SEL totals			136	13	15	28	60	12	0	0	0	4
NHL totals			489	46	58	104	190	17	0	2	2	2

=== International ===
Medal record

Representing Sweden

Ice hockey

World Championships
Silver medal – second place	2004 Czech Republic	

Year	Team	Event	Result	GP	G	A	Pts	PIM
2001	Sweden	WJC18	7th	6	3	3	6	4
2001	Sweden	WJC	4th	7	1	2	3	16
2002	Sweden	WJC	6th	7	0	0	0	4
2003	Sweden	WJC	8th	4	0	1	1	14
2004	Sweden	WC	2nd place, silver medalist(s)	9	0	0	0	6
Junior totals				24	4	6	10	38
Senior totals				9	0	0	0	6

Awards and achievements
Preceded by Krys Kolanos	Phoenix Coyotes first-round draft pick 2001	Succeeded by Jakub Koreis
