= Kevin Klein (ice hockey) =

Canadian ice hockey player (born 1984)

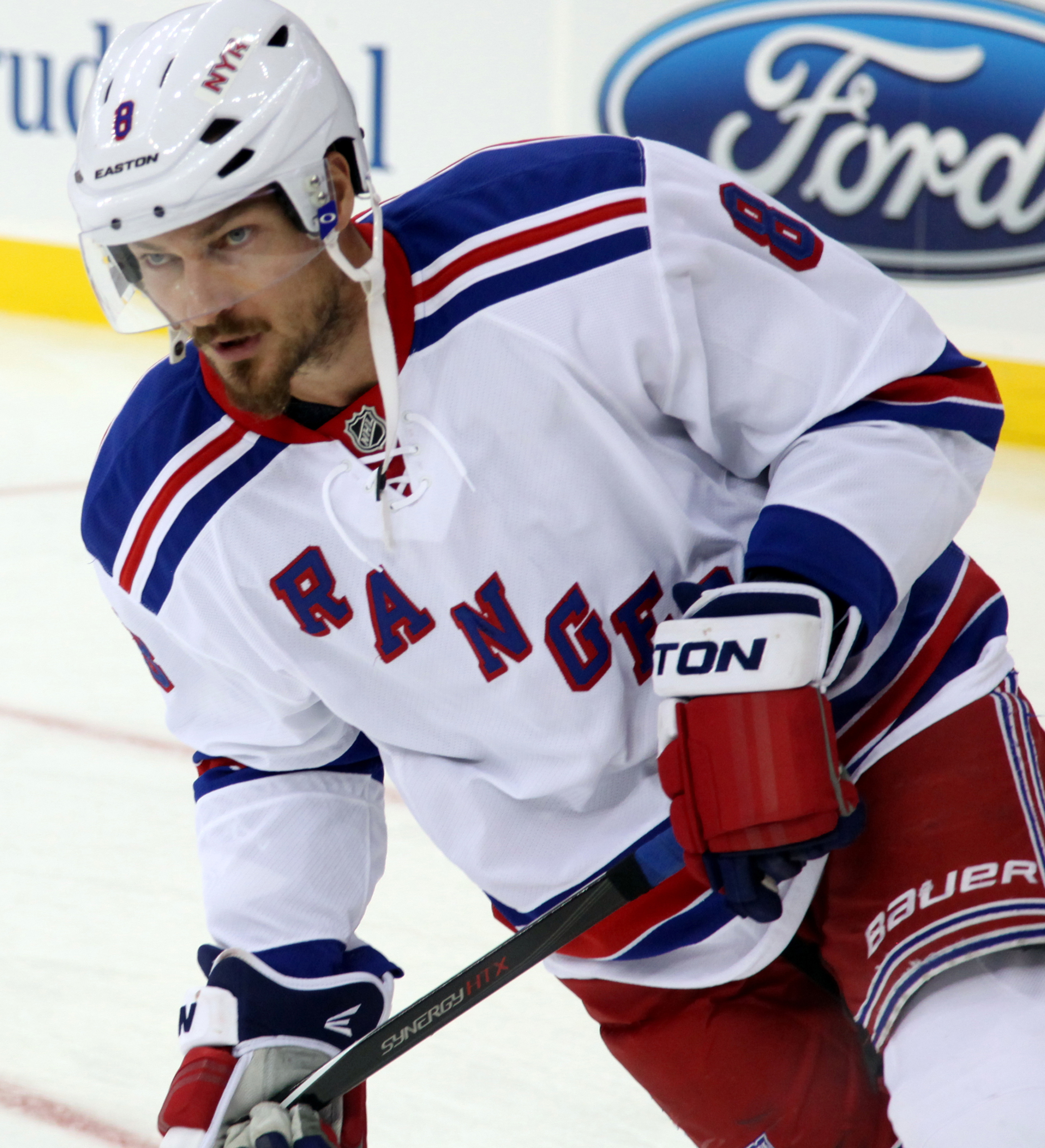
- Klein as a Ranger in October 2014.
- Born: December 13, 1984 (age 41) Kitchener, Ontario, Canada
- Height: 6 ft 1 in (185 cm)
- Weight: 200 lb (91 kg; 14 st 4 lb)
- Position: Defence
- Shot: Right
- Played for: Nashville Predators; Herlev Eagles; New York Rangers; ZSC Lions
- NHL draft: 37th overall, 2003; Nashville Predators
- Playing career: 2004–2019

Kevin R. Klein (born December 13, 1984) is a Canadian former professional ice hockey player. He played as a defenceman for the New York Rangers and the Nashville Predators of the National Hockey League (NHL). He was selected in the second round, 37th overall, by the Nashville Predators at the 2003 NHL entry draft. He completed his 15 year career playing two seasons as an alternate captain of the ZSC Lions of the National League (NL).

== Playing career ==
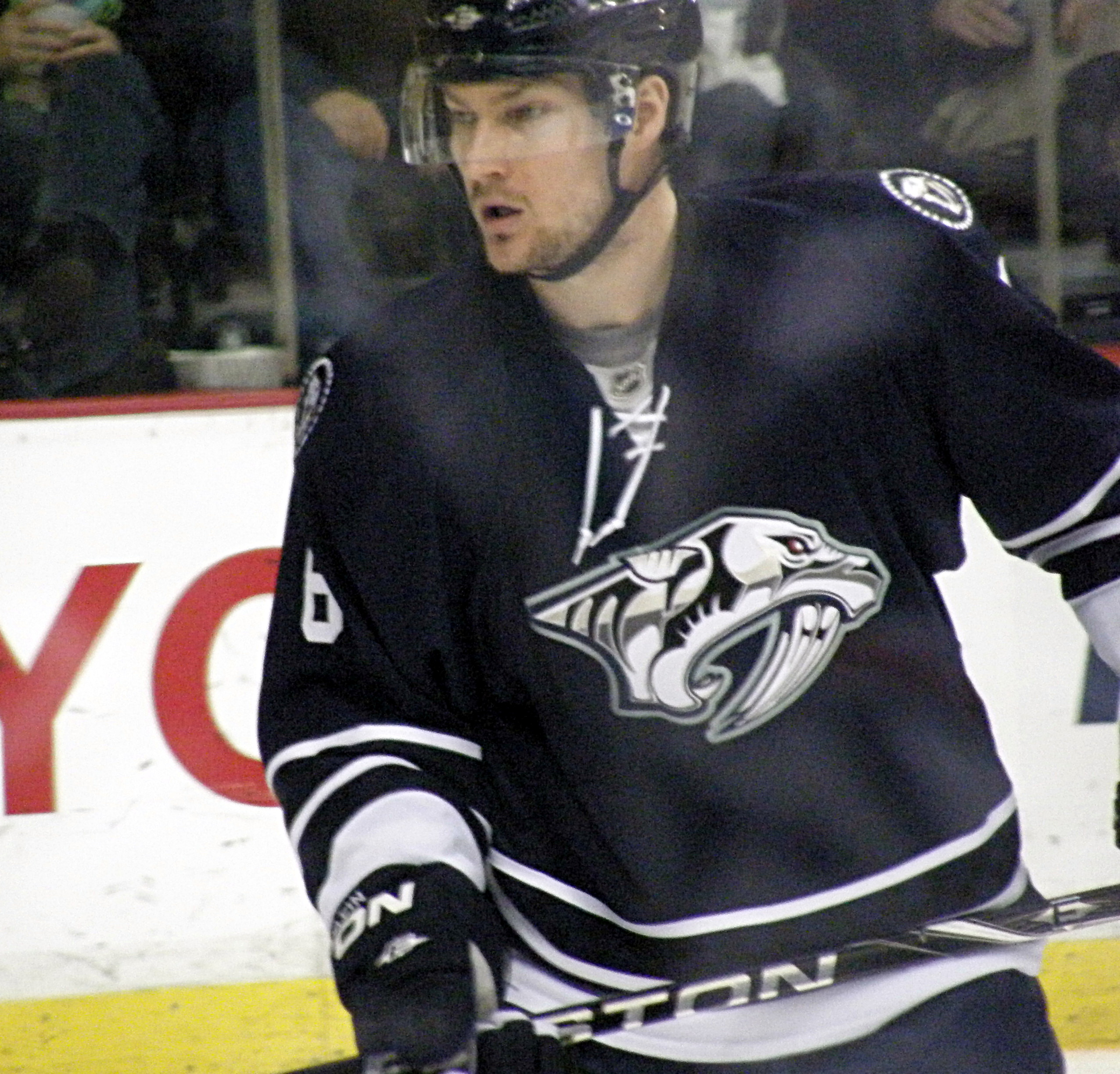
Klein as a Predator.

Klein was drafted by the Nashville Predators in the second round, 37th overall, at the 2003 NHL entry draft. He played four years of junior hockey in the Ontario Hockey League (OHL), three with the Toronto St. Michael's Majors and one with the Guelph Storm. Following junior hockey, he played the majority of the next three seasons with the Milwaukee Admirals, Nashville's American Hockey League (AHL) affiliate.

During the 2006–07 season on January 26, 2007, Klein scored his first career NHL goal, which came against the Chicago Blackhawks.

On July 16, 2008, Klein signed a two-year, $1.3 million contract extension with the Predators. He played a total 63 games with the Predators in the 2008–09 season.

In the following season, 2009–10, Klein played his first full season with the Predators, recording two goals and 16 assists for 18 points in 81 games.

In September 2012, Nashville signed Klein to a five-year, $14.5 million contract extension. He responded by scoring three goals and handing out 11 assists for 14 points in 47 games during the lockout-shortened 2012–13 season.

On January 22, 2014, Klein was traded by the Predators to the New York Rangers in exchange for defenseman Michael Del Zotto.

On December 9, 2014, Klein lost part of his left ear on a high stick in the first period of a game against the Pittsburgh Penguins. He had it stitched back on, came back to play, and scored the game-winning goal in overtime.

In the 2016–17 season, Klein suffered from back spasms and remained a healthy scratch by New York for most of the teams post-season run. In the offseason, on July 7, at the age of 32, Klein forfeited nearly $3 million in salary from the final one year left on his contract with the Rangers in announcing his retirement from the NHL.

Having expressed desire in continuing his career abroad, on July 14, 2017, Klein signed a one-year contract with the ZSC Lions of the National League (NL). He made his NL debut on September 8, 2017, against the SCL Tigers at the Ilfis Stadium and scored his first goal that same day, an OT game-winning goal. After being crowned Swiss champion in April 2018, Klein signed a one-year contract extension with the Lions on May 23, 2018.

Following his second season with the Lions, enduring a disappointing 2018–19 for ZSC in failing to qualify for the post-season, Klein announced his retirement from his professional career on March 25, 2019.

== Career statistics ==
=== Regular season and playoffs ===
			Regular season					Playoffs
Season	Team	League	GP	G	A	Pts	PIM	GP	G	A	Pts	PIM
1999–2000	Kitchener Jr. Rangers AAA	Bantam	54	12	29	41	40	—	—	—	—	—
2000–01	Toronto St. Michael's Majors	OHL	58	3	16	19	21	18	0	5	5	17
2001–02	Toronto St. Michael's Majors	OHL	68	5	22	27	35	15	2	7	9	12
2002–03	Toronto St. Michael's Majors	OHL	67	11	33	44	88	17	1	9	10	8
2003–04	Toronto St. Michael's Majors	OHL	5	0	1	1	2	—	—	—	—	—
2003–04	Guelph Storm	OHL	46	6	23	29	40	22	10	11	21	12
2004–05	Rockford Icehogs	UHL	3	2	1	3	0	—	—	—	—	—
2004–05	Milwaukee Admirals	AHL	65	4	12	16	22	7	0	0	0	11
2005–06	Milwaukee Admirals	AHL	76	10	32	42	31	21	3	7	10	31
2005–06	Nashville Predators	NHL	2	0	0	0	0	—	—	—	—	—
2006–07	Milwaukee Admirals	AHL	70	5	15	20	67	4	1	0	1	0
2006–07	Nashville Predators	NHL	3	1	0	1	0	—	—	—	—	—
2007–08	Milwaukee Admirals	AHL	9	0	3	3	2	—	—	—	—	—
2007–08	Nashville Predators	NHL	13	0	2	2	6	—	—	—	—	—
2008–09	Nashville Predators	NHL	63	4	8	12	19	—	—	—	—	—
2009–10	Nashville Predators	NHL	81	1	10	11	27	6	0	2	2	4
2010–11	Nashville Predators	NHL	81	2	16	18	24	12	1	2	3	6
2011–12	Nashville Predators	NHL	66	4	17	21	4	10	2	2	4	2
2012–13	Herlev Eagles	DEN	8	1	2	3	29	—	—	—	—	—
2012–13	Nashville Predators	NHL	47	3	11	14	9	—	—	—	—	—
2013–14	Nashville Predators	NHL	47	1	2	3	21	—	—	—	—	—
2013–14	New York Rangers	NHL	30	1	5	6	0	25	1	3	4	6
2014–15	New York Rangers	NHL	65	9	17	26	25	14	0	4	4	2
2015–16	New York Rangers	NHL	69	9	17	26	19	5	0	1	1	7
2016–17	New York Rangers	NHL	60	3	11	14	31	1	0	1	1	0
2017–18	ZSC Lions	NL	45	10	12	22	60	17	3	9	12	16
2018–19	ZSC Lions	NL	47	10	14	24	16	—	—	—	—	—
NHL totals			627	38	116	154	185	73	4	15	19	27

=== International ===
Year	Team	Event	GP	G	A	Pts	PIM
2002	Canada Ontario	U17	4	0	0	0	6
2004	Canada	WJC	6	0	0	0	0
Junior totals			10	0	0	0	6
