= Nils Ekman =

Swedish ice hockey player

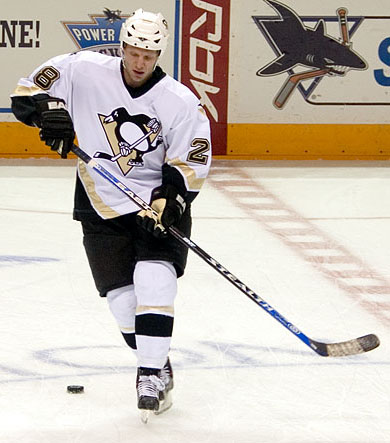
- Born: 11 March 1976 (age 50) Stockholm, Sweden
- Height: 6 ft 0 in (183 cm)
- Weight: 185 lb (84 kg; 13 st 3 lb)
- Position: Left wing
- Shot: Left
- Played for: NHL; Tampa Bay Lightning; San Jose Sharks; Pittsburgh Penguins; SM-liiga; Espoo Blues; RSL; Khimik Moscow Oblast; KHL; SKA St. Petersburg; SHL; Djurgårdens IF
- National team: Sweden
- NHL draft: 107th overall, 1994; Calgary Flames
- Playing career: 1996–2011

Nils Karl "Nisse" Ekman (born 11 March 1976) is a Swedish former professional ice hockey right winger. During his 15-year career as a player at the professional level he played in the National Hockey League (NHL), Swedish Elite League (SHL), Kontinental Hockey League (KHL), and SM-liiga. He played for the SEL team Djurgårdens IF until he suffered a stroke in December 2010, forcing him to retire from hockey on 10 August 2011.

== Playing career ==
=== Junior career ===
Ekman spent his formative years playing in his native Sweden. In season 1993–94, after scoring four goals and five assists in eleven games for Hammarby IF in the Swedish Junior League, Ekman was called up to the parent team in the Swedish tier 2-league HockeyAllsvenskan, where he scored nine points in 18 games. Catching the eye of the Calgary Flames, he was drafted by the team in the 1994 NHL entry draft in the 5th round as the 107th pick overall. In the 1994–95 season, after a short two-game stint in the Swedish junior league, he totalled 10 goals and 7 assists in 29 games for the parent club. After another year in Hammarby, where he scored 9 goals and totalled 7 assists in 26 games, he went to play in Finland.

=== Finnish career ===
Ekman played a large part of his early years in Finland. In season 1996–97, he played with Kiekko-Espoo of the SM-liiga, scoring 24 goals and adding 19 assists in 50 games. He also added two goals in four playoff games. The next year, his totals declined, as he notched 14 goals with 14 assists in 42 games, causing many to believe he was another European-drafted bust. However, Ekman had a strong playoffs with two goals and two assists in seven games.

Following his team's elimination from the playoffs, Ekman signed a contract with Calgary, who were impressed at his development, and Ekman joined the Saint John Flames in the American Hockey League (AHL). However, he did not play in any games and returned to Kiekko-Espoo for the 1998–99 season, notching 34 points in 52 games. He would not return to play in Europe for three years as he left for North America.

=== NHL career ===
Having no room for him, on 20 November 1999, Calgary traded Ekman to the Tampa Bay Lightning along with a 4th round selection (Vladimir Gorbunov) in the 2000 Entry Draft for Andreas Johansson. He made his debut with the Lightning that season, but scored only 4 points in 28 games. To gain more experience, he joined the IHL and split the 1999–2000 season with the Detroit Vipers and the Long Beach Ice Dogs, notching 32 points in 37 games and earning rookie of the year honors. He also had 6 points in 5 playoff games for Long Beach. During the 2000–01 season, after 36 points in 33 games for Detroit, he was recalled to the NHL, where he improved on his earlier showing and scored 20 points in 43 games. However, he had a very low plus/minus rating of -15.

In the summer of 2001 he was traded to the New York Rangers, but after failing to get a place on the squad he moved back to Sweden and played with Djurgårdens IF in Swedish elite league Elitserien for a season and scored 31 points in 38 games while playing a strong two-way game. Determined to make the NHL, he resigned with the Rangers on July 9, 2002 for the 2002–03 NHL season, but did not make the team and played with the Hartford Wolf Pack in the AHL. Showing how far he had developed, Ekman put up 30 goals and 36 assists in 57 games. However, he was unable to crack the New York lineup because the team preferred to give veterans playing time over youngsters.

On 12 August 2003, Ekman was traded to the San Jose Sharks for Chad Wiseman. A team that had completely flopped the previous season, the Sharks were willing to give the untested Ekman a chance. For the 2003–04 NHL season he posted a career high in goals (22) and had 33 assists, as well as a franchise-record plus 35 rating, negating all doubts about defensive struggles. Still, he had only 3 assists in 16 games for San Jose in the playoffs.

=== NHL lockout ===
During the 2004–05 NHL lockout, Ekman proved that 2004 was no fluke with 18 goals and 27 assists in 44 games for Djurgården. This was the highest total on the team, and fifth-highest in the league (eighth-highest in goals) that had players like Peter Forsberg and Henrik Zetterberg.

=== Post-lockout ===
Ekman started the 2005–06 NHL season rather slowly coming back from the lockout. In fact in his first 29 games he only scored seven points. However, he started to click on a line with Joe Thornton and Jonathan Cheechoo, and he responded by scoring 29 points in his next 23 games, including a four-game span when he had three four-point games. During this season, he set a new career high for assists and points with 36 and 57 respectively, along with 21 goals in 76 games.

On 20 July 2006, Ekman was traded along with goaltending prospect Patrick Ehelechner to the Pittsburgh Penguins in exchange for a 2007 second-round draft pick. Later in the same year, November 8, he scored a natural hat trick in four minutes and ten seconds in the second period against the Tampa Bay Lightning, setting a Penguins franchise record.

Ekman dislocated his left elbow in a home game win (4-1) against Toronto Maple Leafs on 29 December 2006. He was forced to sit out for three months before he could return to the ice and made his comeback against the Ottawa Senators on March 6 and had four penalty minutes and -1, logging nearly 8 minutes of ice time.

For season 2007–08, Ekman moved to Russia for play with Khimik Moscow Oblast in the Russian Super League. Next season, he signed with SKA Saint Petersburg in the newly formed Kontinental Hockey League.

After two seasons with the St. Petersburg-based club, scoring 21 goals and 62 points in 83 games, Ekman signed a three-year deal with his former club Djurgården in May 2010.

=== Retirement ===
In what would be his final season, Ekman played 20 games, scoring 4 goals and 9 points before suffering a stroke in late December 2010. Ekman was hospitalized until 14 March 2011, when he was discharged and missed the remaining games of the 2010–11 Elitserien season. Subsequently, Ekman announced his retirement on 10 August 2011, at the age of 35 when neurologists of Karolinska University Hospital said it would not be safe to resume playing hockey. One year after the stroke Ekman participated in Vasaloppet to provide attention to the Swedish Stroke Association. He crossed the finish line after 08:56:00 (8 h, 56 min).

== Awards ==
- Awarded the Gary F. Longman Memorial Trophy (IHL Rookie of the Year) in 2000.

== Career statistics ==
=== Regular season and playoffs ===
			Regular season					Playoffs
Season	Team	League	GP	G	A	Pts	PIM	GP	G	A	Pts	PIM
1993–94	Hammarby IF	SWE U20	11	4	5	9	14	—	—	—	—	—
1993–94	Hammarby IF	SWE.2	18	7	2	9	4	2	0	0	0	2
1994–95	Hammarby IF	J20	2	2	1	3	0	—	—	—	—	—
1994–95	Hammarby IF	SWE.2	32	10	8	18	18	—	—	—	—	—
1995–96	Hammarby IF	J20	10	5	9	14	6	—	—	—	—	—
1995–96	Hammarby IF	SWE.2	26	9	7	16	53	1	0	0	0	0
1996–97	Blues	SM-l	50	24	19	43	60	4	2	0	2	4
1997–98	Blues	SM-l	43	14	14	28	86	7	2	2	4	27
1997–98	Saint John Flames	AHL	—	—	—	—	—	1	0	0	0	2
1998–99	Blues	SM-l	52	20	14	34	96	3	1	1	2	6
1999–2000	Tampa Bay Lightning	NHL	28	2	2	4	36	—	—	—	—	—
1999–2000	Detroit Vipers	IHL	10	7	2	9	8	—	—	—	—	—
1999–2000	Long Beach Ice Dogs	IHL	27	11	12	23	26	5	3	3	6	2
2000–01	Detroit Vipers	IHL	33	22	14	36	63	—	—	—	—	—
2000–01	Tampa Bay Lightning	NHL	43	9	11	20	40	—	—	—	—	—
2001–02	Djurgårdens IF	SEL	38	16	15	31	57	4	1	0	1	32
2002–03	Hartford Wolf Pack	AHL	57	30	36	66	73	2	0	2	2	4
2003–04	San Jose Sharks	NHL	82	22	33	55	34	16	0	3	3	8
2004–05	Djurgårdens IF	SEL	44	18	27	45	106	12	4	5	9	20
2005–06	San Jose Sharks	NHL	77	21	36	57	54	11	2	2	4	8
2006–07	Pittsburgh Penguins	NHL	34	6	9	15	24	1	0	0	0	0
2007–08	Khimik Moscow Oblast	RSL	57	22	21	43	87	4	0	1	1	0
2008–09	SKA St. Petersburg	KHL	46	12	20	32	50	—	—	—	—	—
2009–10	SKA St. Petersburg	KHL	37	9	21	30	36	3	0	0	0	2
2010–11	Djurgårdens IF	SEL	20	4	5	9	33	—	—	—	—	—
SM-l totals			145	58	47	105	242	14	5	3	8	37
NHL totals			264	60	91	151	188	28	2	5	7	16
SEL totals			102	38	47	85	196	16	5	5	10	52

=== International ===
Year	Team	Event	GP	G	A	Pts	PIM
1994	Sweden	EJC	4	1	1	2	4
1996	Sweden	WJC	7	2	1	3	4
2004	Sweden	WCH	0	—	—	—	—
2008	Sweden	WC	9	0	6	6	4
Junior totals			11	3	2	5	8
Senior totals			9	0	6	6	4
