= Ben Eager =

Canadian ice hockey player (born 1984)

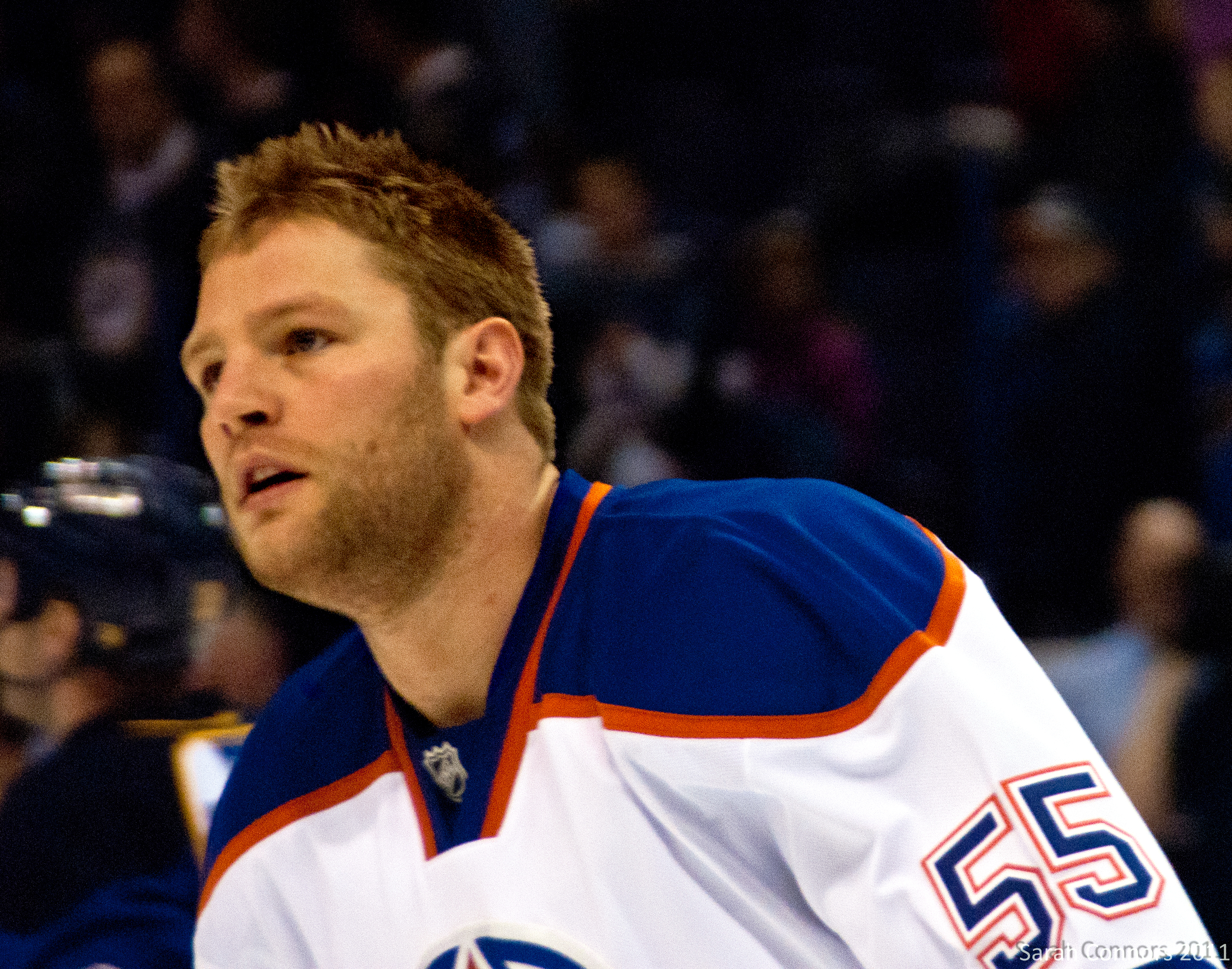
- Eager with the Edmonton Oilers in 2012
- Born: January 22, 1984 (age 42) Ottawa, Ontario, Canada
- Height: 6 ft 2 in (188 cm)
- Weight: 235 lb (107 kg; 16 st 11 lb)
- Position: Left wing
- Shot: Left
- Played for: Philadelphia Flyers; Chicago Blackhawks; Atlanta Thrashers; San Jose Sharks; Edmonton Oilers; CSKA Moscow
- NHL draft: 23rd overall, 2002; Phoenix Coyotes
- Playing career: 2004–2015

Benjamin Arthur Eager (born January 22, 1984) is a Canadian former professional ice hockey player. Playing the role of an enforcer, Eager won the Stanley Cup with the Chicago Blackhawks in 2010.

== Playing career ==
Eager was drafted in the first round, 23rd overall, by the Phoenix Coyotes in the 2002 NHL entry draft. He was later traded by the Coyotes, with goaltender Sean Burke and forward Branko Radivojevič, to the Philadelphia Flyers in exchange for centre Mike Comrie.

The 2006–07 season would see Eager lead the NHL in penalty minutes, even though he only played 63 games. That same season, he also won the Pelle Lindbergh Memorial Trophy as the Flyer who has most improved from the previous season, as voted by his teammates.

Eager was traded to the Chicago Blackhawks on December 18, 2007 for Jim Vandermeer.

Eager scored his first Stanley Cup playoff goal in game two of Chicago's victory against the Vancouver Canucks on May 2, 2009, in Vancouver. This led to the Blackhawks' first victory against the Canucks and evened the series at one game apiece. Eager scored his second playoff goal on May 31, 2010, in game two of the Stanley Cup Final against his former club, the Philadelphia Flyers. His goal ended up being the game winner, as the 'Hawks won 2–1. On June 9, 2010, he and the Blackhawks won the Stanley Cup, defeating the Flyers 4–3 in overtime in game six.

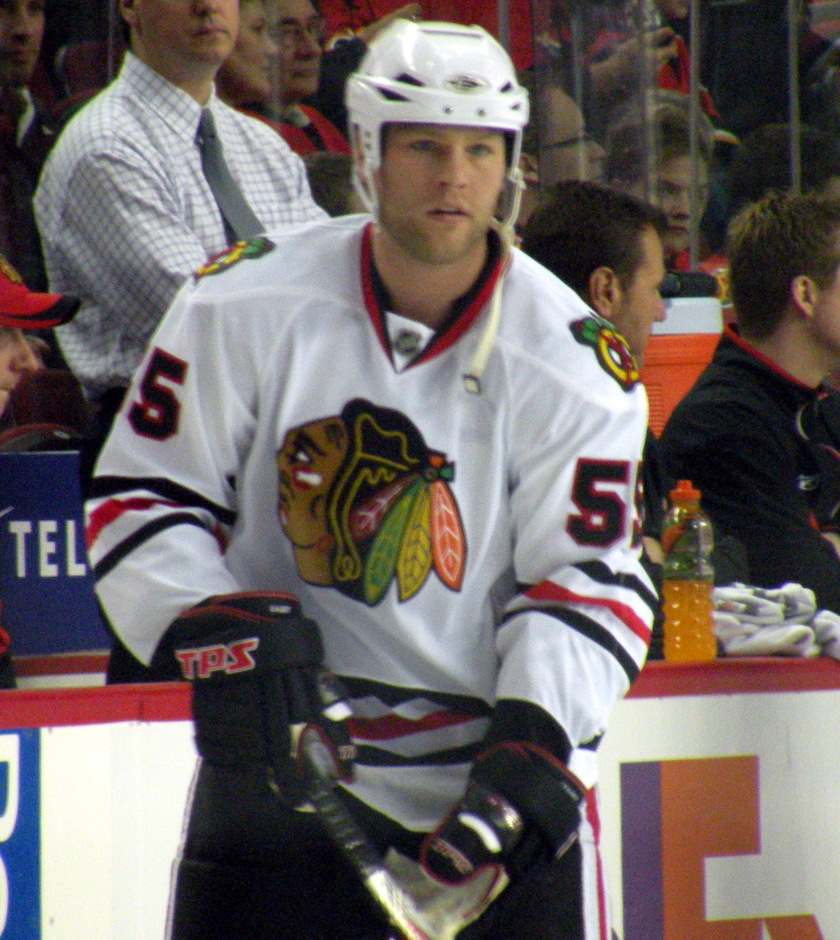
Eager in April 2009 during his tenure with the Chicago Blackhawks.

On June 23, 2010, Eager was traded to the Atlanta Thrashers, alongside Dustin Byfuglien, Brent Sopel, and Akim Aliu, in exchange for the 24th and 54th overall picks in the 2010 NHL entry draft, both previously acquired from New Jersey, Marty Reasoner, Joey Crabb and Jeremy Morin. During the 2010–11 season, Eager delivered a sucker punch to the Toronto Maple Leafs' Colby Armstrong. Eager received a five-minute major, a match penalty for intent to injure and was ejected from the game. The NHL further suspended him for four games due to the incident. Midway through the season, he was traded to the San Jose Sharks for a fifth-round pick in 2011.

Eager signed a three-year, $3.3 million contract as an unrestricted free agent with the Edmonton Oilers on July 1, 2011.

On October 20, 2012, Eager was arrested and charged with assault, assault with bodily harm and assault with a weapon following an altercation at a bar in Toronto.

On March 13, 2013, Eager was placed on waivers by the Oilers for assignment to their American Hockey League (AHL) affiliate, the Oklahoma City Barons.

Eager left the Oilers organization as a free agent and on July 11, 2014, signed abroad on a one-year contract with CSKA Moscow of the Kontinental Hockey League (KHL). He returned mid-season to America, signing for the remainder of the campaign with the Chicago Wolves of the AHL.

In November 2016, Eager was named to the Chicago Blackhawks alumni team to play in the annual NHL Winter Classic.

== Career statistics ==
=== Regular season and playoffs ===
Bold indicates led league

			Regular season					Playoffs
Season	Team	League	GP	G	A	Pts	PIM	GP	G	A	Pts	PIM
1999–2000	Ottawa Jr. Senators	CJHL	50	8	11	19	119	—	—	—	—	—
2000–01	Oshawa Generals	OHL	61	4	6	10	120	—	—	—	—	—
2001–02	Oshawa Generals	OHL	63	14	23	37	255	5	0	1	1	13
2002–03	Oshawa Generals	OHL	58	16	24	40	216	8	0	4	4	8
2003–04	Oshawa Generals	OHL	61	25	27	52	204	7	2	3	5	31
2003–04	Philadelphia Phantoms	AHL	5	0	0	0	0	3	0	1	1	8
2004–05	Philadelphia Phantoms	AHL	66	7	10	17	232	16	1	1	2	71
2005–06	Philadelphia Phantoms	AHL	49	6	12	18	256	—	—	—	—	—
2005–06	Philadelphia Flyers	NHL	25	3	5	8	18	2	0	0	0	26
2006–07	Philadelphia Phantoms	AHL	3	0	0	0	21	—	—	—	—	—
2006–07	Philadelphia Flyers	NHL	63	6	5	11	**233**	—	—	—	—	—
2007–08	Philadelphia Flyers	NHL	23	0	0	0	62	—	—	—	—	—
2007–08	Chicago Blackhawks	NHL	9	0	2	2	27	—	—	—	—	—
2008–09	Chicago Blackhawks	NHL	75	11	4	15	161	17	1	1	2	**61**
2009–10	Chicago Blackhawks	NHL	60	7	9	16	120	18	1	2	3	20
2010–11	Atlanta Thrashers	NHL	34	3	7	10	77	—	—	—	—	—
2010–11	San Jose Sharks	NHL	34	4	3	7	43	10	1	0	1	41
2011–12	Edmonton Oilers	NHL	63	8	5	13	107	—	—	—	—	—
2012–13	Edmonton Oilers	NHL	14	1	1	2	25	—	—	—	—	—
2012–13	Oklahoma City Barons	AHL	9	0	2	2	13	13	1	4	5	64
2013–14	Oklahoma City Barons	AHL	44	6	2	8	136	2	0	0	0	4
2013–14	Edmonton Oilers	NHL	7	0	1	1	2	—	—	—	—	—
2014–15	CSKA Moscow	KHL	5	0	0	0	2	—	—	—	—	—
2014–15	Chicago Wolves	AHL	26	0	2	2	86	—	—	—	—	—
AHL totals			202	19	28	47	744	32	2	6	8	147
NHL totals			407	43	42	85	875	47	3	3	6	148

=== International ===
Year	Team	Event	GP	G	A	Pts	PIM
2002	Canada	WJC18	8	1	3	4	45

Awards and achievements
Preceded by Jakub Koreis	Phoenix Coyotes first-round draft pick 2002	Succeeded by Blake Wheeler
