= André Deveaux =

Bahamian-born Canadian ice hockey player

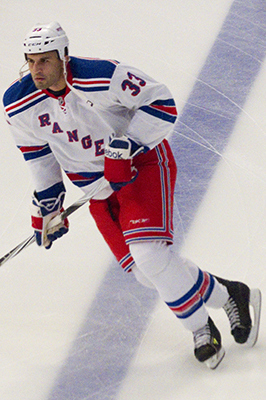
- Deveaux with the New York Rangers in 2011
- Born: February 23, 1984 (age 42) Freeport, Bahamas
- Height: 6 ft 3 in (191 cm)
- Weight: 220 lb (100 kg; 15 st 10 lb)
- Position: Centre
- Shot: Right
- Played for: Toronto Maple Leafs; New York Rangers; Avtomobilist Yekaterinburg; Rögle BK; HC Sparta Praha; Sheffield Steelers; HK Dukla Trenčín
- NHL draft: 182nd overall, 2002; Montreal Canadiens
- Playing career: 2004–2018

Andre Deveaux (born February 23, 1984) is a Bahamian-born Canadian former professional ice hockey player who last played for the Hamilton Steelhawks in the Allan Cup Hockey League (ACH). He previously played in the National Hockey League (NHL) with the Toronto Maple Leafs and the New York Rangers, as well as HC Sparta Praha of the Czech Extraliga (ELH). He was selected by the Montreal Canadiens in the sixth round (182nd overall) of the 2002 NHL entry draft. Deveaux was born in Freeport, Bahamas, but he is a naturalized Canadian citizen who was raised in Welland, Ontario.

== Playing career ==
Initially drafted by the Montreal Canadiens, 182nd overall in the 2002 NHL entry draft, Deveaux made his National Hockey League (NHL) debut with the Toronto Maple Leafs on November 27, 2008, against the Ottawa Senators. In addition to playing with the Maple Leafs, Deveaux has been a member of the Toronto Marlies, Chicago Wolves and Springfield Falcons of the American Hockey League (AHL) and the Johnstown Chiefs of the ECHL. Deveaux is the first person born in the Bahamas to play in the NHL.

On February 12, 2010, after getting penalized for a melee in a game between the Marlies and the Manitoba Moose in Winnipeg involving almost all the players on the ice, Deveaux was alleged to have been taunted with racial slurs by a fan while in the penalty box. Deveaux subsequently threw a roll of hockey tape in the heckler's direction and was suspended for three games by the AHL.

On August 24, 2010, Deveaux signed as a free agent to a one-year contract to return to the AHL's Chicago Wolves.

On August 16, 2011, Deveaux signed as an unrestricted free agent with the New York Rangers.

On November 25, 2011, while playing for the Rangers, Deveaux was suspended by the NHL for three games, for delivering an illegal check to the head of forward Tomáš Fleischmann in a game against the Florida Panthers on November 23, 2011. Deveaux was eligible to return December 1, 2011, however instead Rangers president and general manager Glen Sather announced Deveaux had been assigned to the Connecticut Whale of the AHL.

On July 9, 2012, Deveaux signed a one-year contract as a free agent with the Panthers. With the NHL lockout in effect, Deveaux was directly assigned to Florida's AHL affiliate, the San Antonio Rampage. On March 19, 2013, during a game in Cedar Park, Texas, against the Texas Stars, Deveaux was accidentally high-sticked in the face. As he fell to the ice he slid underneath teammate Nolan Yonkman, knocking him over. As Yonkman tried not to fall he accidentally stepped on Deveaux's face, with full force. The resulting cut required dozens of stitches to close.

On March 26, 2015, during a Swedish HockeyAllsvenskan game between VIK Västerås HK and Rögle BK, opposing defenceman Per Helmersson checked Deveaux into the boards, resulting in Deveaux losing consciousness. At the following game between the teams, Deveaux attacked Helmersson from behind during the warmups. On March 30, after video of the incident was posted on YouTube, Rögle BK terminated Deveaux's contract for next season. Swedish prosecutors subsequently issued an arrest warrant for Deveaux in response to the incident. On May 8, Deveaux and his wife held a press conference in Toronto, outlining his side of the incident and describing the lingering effects of the Helmersson hit.

Deveaux took a hiatus and returned to the professional during the 2016–17 season in agreeing to a try-out with Czech club HC Sparta Praha of the Czech Extraliga on January 26, 2017. Keen to prove a point with his play rather than his past, Deveaux secured a contract for the remainder of the season on February 3, 2017. Over the final stretch of the season, he contributed with one goal and one assist in four games.

On October 20, 2017, the Sheffield Steelers announced that they had signed Deveaux while announcing that his hiatus was due to injury. On November 28, 2017, Sheffield announced his release after posting four points in six games. He continued the season abroad, playing out the remainder of the year in Slovakia with HK Dukla Trenčín of the Slovak Extraliga.

== Personal ==
As of 2019, Deveaux works as a firefighter with Toronto Pearson Airport's Fire and Emergency Services.

== Career statistics ==
			Regular season					Playoffs
Season	Team	League	GP	G	A	Pts	PIM	GP	G	A	Pts	PIM
1999–2000	Fort Erie Meteors	GHL	44	11	14	25	84	—	—	—	—	—
2000–01	Belleville Bulls	OHL	58	3	6	9	65	10	3	6	9	6
2001–02	Belleville Bulls	OHL	64	8	13	21	89	11	1	2	3	30
2002–03	Belleville Bulls	OHL	34	6	12	18	93	—	—	—	—	—
2002–03	Owen Sound Attack	OHL	29	9	10	19	33	4	2	2	4	6
2003–04	Owen Sound Attack	OHL	64	16	30	46	151	7	3	3	6	21
2004–05	Springfield Falcons	AHL	73	4	8	12	210	—	—	—	—	—
2005–06	Springfield Falcons	AHL	59	6	5	11	135	—	—	—	—	—
2005–06	Johnstown Chiefs	ECHL	11	4	7	11	36	5	1	1	2	2
2006–07	Springfield Falcons	AHL	8	1	2	3	8	—	—	—	—	—
2006–07	Johnstown Chiefs	ECHL	21	6	8	14	51	—	—	—	—	—
2006–07	Chicago Wolves	AHL	28	4	4	8	105	14	3	2	5	48
2007–08	Chicago Wolves	AHL	66	7	11	18	232	24	0	2	2	67
2008–09	Toronto Marlies	AHL	38	14	11	25	114	6	0	3	3	14
2008–09	Toronto Maple Leafs	NHL	21	0	1	1	75	—	—	—	—	—
2009–10	Toronto Marlies	AHL	72	16	25	41	216	—	—	—	—	—
2009–10	Toronto Maple Leafs	NHL	1	0	0	0	0	—	—	—	—	—
2010–11	Chicago Wolves	AHL	73	23	23	46	194	—	—	—	—	—
2011–12	Connecticut Whale	AHL	59	20	20	40	157	8	2	2	4	47
2011–12	New York Rangers	NHL	9	0	1	1	29	—	—	—	—	—
2012–13	San Antonio Rampage	AHL	46	7	7	14	56	—	—	—	—	—
2013–14	Avtomobilist Yekaterinburg	KHL	20	3	4	7	25	3	1	0	1	6
2014–15	Rögle BK	Allsv	20	6	3	9	67	10	2	3	5	39
2016–17	HC Sparta Praha	ELH	4	1	1	2	0	1	0	1	1	0
2017–18	Sheffield Steelers	EIHL	6	2	2	4	48	—	—	—	—	—
2017–18	HK Dukla Trenčín	SVK	18	1	0	1	78	16	0	2	2	56
2018–19	Hamilton Steelhawks	ACH	21	9	14	23	16	4	1	0	1	7
AHL totals			522	102	116	218	1429	52	5	9	14	176
NHL totals			31	0	2	2	104	—	—	—	—	—

== Awards and honours ==
- 2008 Calder Cup championship (Chicago Wolves)
