= Carlo Colaiacovo =

Canadian ice hockey player (born 1983)

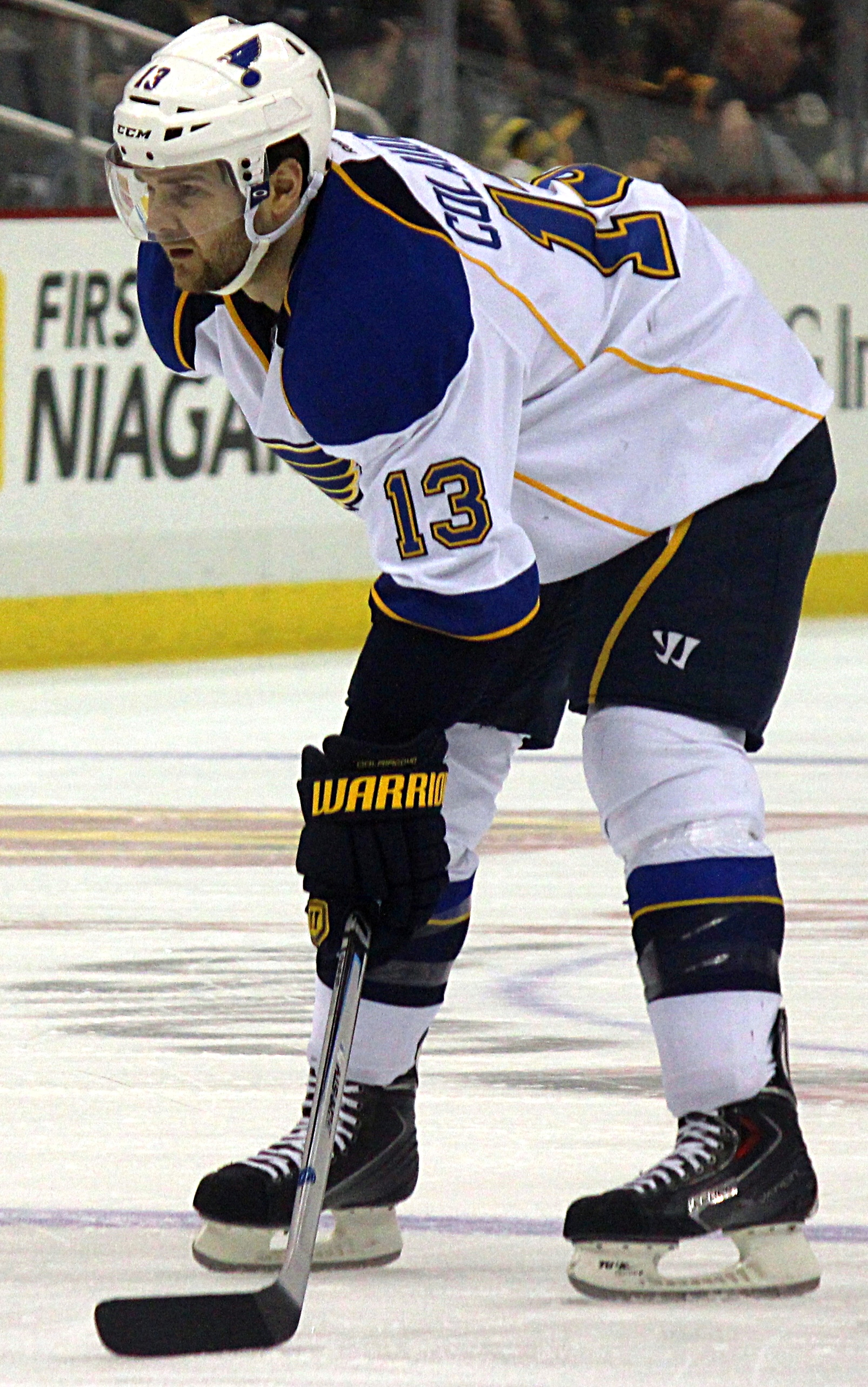
- Colaiacovo with the St. Louis Blues in 2014
- Born: January 27, 1983 (age 43) Toronto, Ontario, Canada
- Height: 6 ft 1 in (185 cm)
- Weight: 202 lb (92 kg; 14 st 6 lb)
- Position: Defence
- Shot: Left
- Played for: Toronto Maple Leafs; St. Louis Blues; Detroit Red Wings; Philadelphia Flyers; Buffalo Sabres; Adler Mannheim
- National team: Canada
- NHL draft: 17th overall, 2001; Toronto Maple Leafs
- Playing career: 2002–2018

Carlo Colaiacovo (/ˌkoʊleɪˈækəvoʊ/ koh-lay-AH-kə-voh; born January 27, 1983) is a Canadian former professional ice hockey defenceman and radio broadcaster. He most recently played for Adler Mannheim in the Deutsche Eishockey Liga (DEL). Following his playing career, Colaiacovo has co-hosted a radio show on Canada’s TSN 1050 radio station, First Up with Korolnek and Colaiacovo.

Colaiacovo has an identical twin brother, Paulo Colaiacovo, who has also played professional ice hockey, as a goaltender.

== Playing career ==
=== Junior hockey ===
Colaiacovo played his major junior hockey with the Erie Otters of the Ontario Hockey League (OHL). He played with the team from 1999 to 2003 collecting 43 goals, 136 points in 209 games. He was an integral member of the Otters 2002 OHL Championship team. The Erie Otters went on to represent the OHL in the Memorial Cup that year. He was a member of Canada's junior team at the 2002 and 2003 World Junior Championships. Canada won silver at both tournaments. He was named a Second-Team OHL All-Star following the 2001–02 and 2002–03 seasons.

=== Professional ===
Colaiacovo was drafted in the first round, 17th overall, by the Toronto Maple Leafs in the 2001 NHL entry draft. He signed a three-year contract with the Maple Leafs on October 8, 2002, after winning a position on the team's defence out of training camp. He made his debut with the Maple Leafs on October 23, 2002, versus the Florida Panthers. He was paired with Bryan McCabe and picked up his first NHL point assisting on the only Maple Leafs goal in the game. He was returned to the OHL after playing in two games, registering just the one point. The following season Colaiacovo did not make the Maple Leafs, and was re-assigned to Toronto's American Hockey League (AHL) affiliate, the St. John's Maple Leafs. That season, he saw extended playing time (up to 30 minutes a night) and saw opportunities on the power-play and penalty-kill units. Colaiacovo was named to the 2004 AHL All-Star Team, but could not play in the game. He finished the season with 6 goals and 31 points. At the onset of the 2005–06 season, Colaiacovo did not play well enough to warrant a place on the team and was sent to the new AHL affiliate, the Toronto Marlies.

On November 8, 2005, Colaiacovo was recalled due to an injury to Aki Berg and he scored his first career NHL goal against the Washington Capitals. On January 23, 2006, Colaiacovo missed a hip check on Václav Varaďa in a game against the Ottawa Senators, smashing head-first into the boards. He was taken off the ice on a stretcher. The injury was a major concussion, and he missed the end of the 2005–06 season. At the start of the following season he was then sent to the Marlies on a conditioning assignment. Colaiacovo recovered fully from his concussion, but later injured his hand in his first game back into the Marlies lineup. On December 4, 2006, the Maple Leafs recalled Colaiacovo from the Marlies and on December 16, he scored his first goal of the season against the New York Rangers. Colaiacovo underwent arthroscopic knee surgery on April 29, 2007. On June 21, 2007, Colaiacovo re-signed with the Maple Leafs to a three-year contract.

On November 24, 2008, Colaiacovo was traded by the Maple Leafs, along with Alexander Steen, to the St. Louis Blues in exchange for forward Lee Stempniak. Colaiacovo finished the 2008–09 season with 30 points between Toronto and St. Louis. In the 2009–10 season, he registered a career-high 32 points, finishing second among Blues defencemen. The off-season, Colaiacovo signed a two-year extension with the Blues. After the 2010–11 season, he joined Team Canada at the IIHF World Championship in Slovakia. The 2011–12 season was the last Colaiacovo played with the Blues, registering 2 goals and 19 points in 64 games. He was normally paired with Alex Pietrangelo on the top pairing. That off-season he became an unrestricted free agent.

On September 12, 2012, Colaiacovo signed a two-year deal with the Detroit Red Wings. In his second game of the season, Colaiacovo suffered a shoulder injury that kept him out for 33 games. He made his home debut for the Red Wings on April 1, 2013, against the Colorado Avalanche. When asked about his feelings over his home debut, Colaiacovo replied, "I'm really looking forward to it. When I first signed here I said the Joe is one of my favorite rinks to play in. I haven't had that chance to do it in a Wings uniform. That's something that's going to keep the adrenaline going for me tonight." With the lockout-shortened 2012–13 season, again largely affected by injury, Colaiacovo was bought out on a compliance from the final year of his contract with the Red Wings on July 3, 2013.

On November 13, 2013, Colaiacovo agreed to a one-year, $550,000 deal to return to the St. Louis Blues as a free agent. The Blues added Colaiacovo after learning that defenceman Jordan Leopold would be out eight weeks due to hand surgery. He was used for spot duty with the Blues, commonly pairing with Roman Polak and Kevin Shattenkirk.

An unrestricted free agent again, Colaiacovo went unsigned until October 30, 2014, when he signed a deal with the Philadelphia Flyers. He was signed to a one-year, two-way contract for $625,000, brought in to replace the injured Braydon Coburn and Andrew MacDonald. After signing, Colaiacovo played in five of the next six games. However, the return of MacDonald forced Colaiacovo out of the lineup and remained out until January when he replaced the injured Coburn again. He appeared in 33 games with the Flyers before becoming an unrestricted free agent again.

On July 3, 2015, Colaiacovo signed a one-year deal as a free agent with the Buffalo Sabres. Colaiacovo scored his first goal with the Sabres on March 23 against Cam Ward of the Carolina Hurricanes. He made 36 appearances for the Sabres in the 2015–16 season from the blueline, contributing with one goal and five points. On November 26, 2016, he belatedly signed as a free agent with Adler Mannheim of the German Deutsche Eishockey Liga for the remainder of the 2016–17 season. He finished his career after his second season with Mannheim.

== Broadcasting career ==
Since September 10, 2018, Colaiacovo has been a sports broadcaster on Toronto's TSN Radio 1050 radio station serving as co-host for their morning show First Up, originally alongside veteran sportscaster Michael Landsberg. In 2021, Aaron Korolnek became the new co-host of First Up alongside Colaiacovo after Landsberg retired from broadcasting. He also appears occasionally on TSN television programming as a studio analyst for hockey.

== Personal ==
Colaiacovo's twin brother Paulo is a former professional hockey player, and his cousin, Matt Finn (born February 24, 1994), was selected by the Toronto Maple Leafs in the second round, 35th overall, of the 2012 NHL entry draft. Coliaicovo himself names the Maple Leafs as his favourite team, having supported the club since childhood.

== Career statistics ==
=== Regular season and playoffs ===
			Regular season					Playoffs
Season	Team	League	GP	G	A	Pts	PIM	GP	G	A	Pts	PIM
1999–2000	Erie Otters	OHL	52	4	18	22	12	13	2	4	6	9
2000–01	Erie Otters	OHL	62	12	27	39	59	14	4	7	11	16
2001–02	Erie Otters	OHL	60	13	27	40	49	21	7	10	17	20
2002–03	Toronto Maple Leafs	NHL	2	0	1	1	0	—	—	—	—	—
2002–03	Erie Otters	OHL	35	14	21	35	12	—	—	—	—	—
2003–04	Toronto Maple Leafs	NHL	2	0	1	1	2	—	—	—	—	—
2003–04	St. John's Maple Leafs	AHL	62	6	25	31	50	—	—	—	—	—
2004–05	St. John's Maple Leafs	AHL	49	4	20	24	59	5	0	1	1	2
2005–06	Toronto Maple Leafs	NHL	21	2	5	7	17	—	—	—	—	—
2005–06	Toronto Marlies	AHL	14	5	6	11	14	—	—	—	—	—
2006–07	Toronto Maple Leafs	NHL	48	8	9	17	22	—	—	—	—	—
2006–07	Toronto Marlies	AHL	5	1	5	6	4	—	—	—	—	—
2007–08	Toronto Maple Leafs	NHL	28	2	4	6	10	—	—	—	—	—
2007–08	Toronto Marlies	AHL	2	0	0	0	0	—	—	—	—	—
2008–09	Toronto Maple Leafs	NHL	10	0	1	1	6	—	—	—	—	—
2008–09	St. Louis Blues	NHL	63	3	26	29	29	4	0	0	0	2
2009–10	St. Louis Blues	NHL	67	7	25	32	60	—	—	—	—	—
2010–11	St. Louis Blues	NHL	65	6	20	26	23	—	—	—	—	—
2011–12	St. Louis Blues	NHL	64	2	17	19	22	7	0	3	3	16
2012–13	Detroit Red Wings	NHL	6	0	1	1	2	9	0	1	1	2
2012–13	Grand Rapids Griffins	AHL	2	0	0	0	0	—	—	—	—	—
2013–14	St. Louis Blues	NHL	25	1	3	4	18	—	—	—	—	—
2014–15	Philadelphia Flyers	NHL	33	2	6	8	10	—	—	—	—	—
2015–16	Buffalo Sabres	NHL	36	1	4	5	10	—	—	—	—	—
2016–17	Adler Mannheim	DEL	27	8	16	24	28	6	1	2	3	2
2017–18	Adler Mannheim	DEL	30	2	8	10	14	6	0	1	1	0
NHL totals			470	34	123	157	231	20	0	4	4	20

Medal record

Ice hockey

Representing Canada

Spengler Cup
Gold medal – first place	2012 Davos	

World Junior Championships
Silver medal – second place	2002 Czech Republic	
Silver medal – second place	2003 Canada	

=== International ===
Year	Team	Event	Result	GP	G	A	Pts	PIM
2000	Canada Ontario	U17	2nd place, silver medalist(s)	5	0	1	1	0
2002	Canada	WJC	2nd place, silver medalist(s)	7	0	3	3	2
2003	Canada	WJC	2nd place, silver medalist(s)	6	1	9	10	2
2011	Canada	WC	5th	5	0	0	0	0
Junior totals				18	1	13	14	4
Senior totals				5	0	0	0	0

== Awards and honours ==
Award	Year
OHL
CHL Top Prospects Game	2001
West Best Defensive Defenceman	2001
Second All-Star Team	2002, 2003
International
WJC First All-Star Team	2003

Awards and achievements
Preceded by Brad Boyes	Toronto Maple Leafs first-round draft pick 2001	Succeeded by Alexander Steen
