= Wayne Gretzky Trophy =

- Sport: Ice hockey
- Awarded for: Western Conference playoff champion

History
- First award: 1999
- Most wins: London Knights (9)
- Most recent: Kitchener Rangers (3)

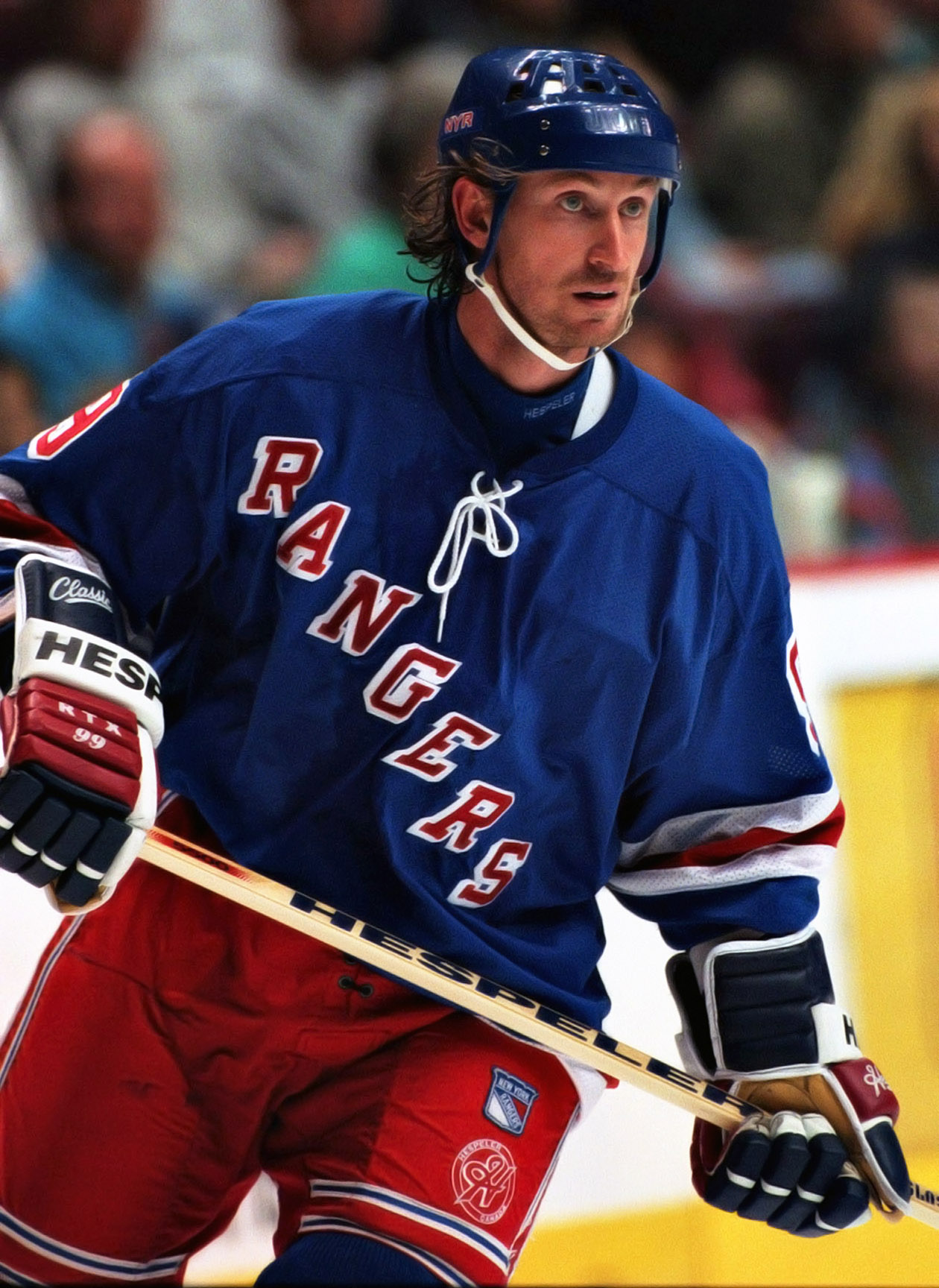
Wayne Gretzky

The Wayne Gretzky Trophy is awarded annually to the champion of the Western conference playoffs in the Ontario Hockey League. It was first awarded in 1999. The winning team competes for the J. Ross Robertson Cup in the OHL finals versus the Bobby Orr Trophy winner.

It is named in honour of Wayne Gretzky. He played for the Sault Ste. Marie Greyhounds in the 1977–78 OHL season, scoring 70 goals as a rookie, establishing an OHL record for most goals by a 16-year-old that stood until 2007. Gretzky also had 112 assists, and 182 points that season, the second highest point total in an OHL season. Gretzky was awarded the Emms Family Award as the rookie of the year, and the William Hanley Trophy as most gentlemanly player.

== Winners ==
List of winners of the Wayne Gretzky Trophy.

Season	Champion	Series	Finalist
1998–99	London Knights	4–3	Owen Sound Platers
1999–2000	Plymouth Whalers	4–1	Sault Ste. Marie Greyhounds
2000–01	Plymouth Whalers	4–1	Erie Otters
2001–02	Erie Otters	4–1	Windsor Spitfires
2002–03	Kitchener Rangers	4–3	Plymouth Whalers
2003–04	Guelph Storm	4–3	London Knights
2004–05	London Knights	4–1	Kitchener Rangers
2005–06	London Knights	4–1	Guelph Storm
2006–07	Plymouth Whalers	4–1	London Knights
2007–08	Kitchener Rangers	4–1	Sault Ste. Marie Greyhounds
2008–09	Windsor Spitfires	4–1	London Knights
2009–10	Windsor Spitfires	4–3	Kitchener Rangers
2010–11	Owen Sound Attack	4–1	Windsor Spitfires
2011–12	London Knights	4–0	Kitchener Rangers
2012–13	London Knights	4–1	Plymouth Whalers
2013–14	Guelph Storm	4–1	Erie Otters
2014–15	Erie Otters	4–2	Sault Ste. Marie Greyhounds
2015–16	London Knights	4–0	Erie Otters
2016–17	Erie Otters	4–2	Owen Sound Attack
2017–18	Sault Ste. Marie Greyhounds	4–3	Kitchener Rangers
2018–19	Guelph Storm	4–3	Saginaw Spirit
2019–20	Playoffs cancelled due to the coronavirus pandemic – trophy not awarded		
2020–21	Season cancelled due to the coronavirus pandemic - trophy not awarded		
2021–22	Windsor Spitfires	4–3	Flint Firebirds
2022–23	London Knights	4–2	Sarnia Sting
2023–24	London Knights	4–2	Saginaw Spirit
2024–25	London Knights	4–0	Kitchener Rangers
2025–26	Kitchener Rangers	4–1	Windsor Spitfires

== See also ==
- List of Canadian Hockey League awards
