= Patrick Ehelechner =

German ice hockey player (born 1984)

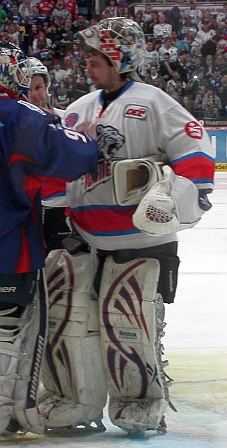
- Ehelechner in 2012
- Born: September 23, 1984 (age 42) Rosenheim, West Germany
- Height: 1.89 m (6 ft 2 in)
- Weight: 83 kg (183 lb; 13 st 1 lb)
- Position: Goaltender
- Caught: Left
- Played for: Sudbury Wolves Hannover Scorpions; Adler Mannheim; Füchse Duisburg; Thomas Sabo Ice Tigers; Augsburger Panther
- NHL draft: 139th overall, 2003; San Jose Sharks
- Playing career: 2002–2015

Patrick Ehelechner (born September 23, 1984) is a German retired professional ice hockey goaltender.

== Playing career ==
Ehelechner was the 139th overall pick in the 2003 NHL entry draft for the San Jose Sharks. He began his professional career in the Deutsche Eishockey Liga with the Hannover Scorpions in 2002. Between 2003 and 2005, Ehelechner played with the Sudbury Wolves of the Ontario Hockey League. He played the 2005–06 season for the Adler Mannheim and the Füchse Duisburg. On July 26, 2006, he was traded along with Nils Ekman from the Sharks to the Penguins in exchange for a second round pick in the 2007 NHL entry draft.
