= Paulo Colaiacovo =

Canadian ice hockey player

- Born: January 27, 1983 (age 43) Toronto, Ontario, Canada
- Height: 6 ft 2 in (188 cm)
- Weight: 220 lb (100 kg; 15 st 10 lb)
- Position: Goaltender
- Caught: Left
- Played for: Colorado Eagles (CHL); Tilburg Trappers (Netherlands); Bloomington PrairieThunder (IHL)
- NHL draft: Undrafted
- Playing career: 2004–2010

Paulo Colaiacovo (/ˌkoʊleɪˈə.koʊvoʊ/; born January 27, 1983) is a Canadian former professional ice hockey goaltender. He is the identical twin brother of National Hockey League defenceman Carlo Colaiacovo. He was born in Toronto, Ontario.

== Playing career ==
Colaiacovo played in the Ontario Hockey League with the Barrie Colts. He joined the Colorado Eagles in the Central Hockey League in 2004, and missed over half the season because of injury, but returned to the team late in the 2004-2005 season to netmind the team through winning the Ray Miron President's Cup.

When the Eagles re-signed him for the following season, the team vice-president and head coach was quoted as saying "Championships are won with good goaltending, and with the signing of Paulo, it will give our team that opportunity again".

In the summer of 2006, it was rumored that Colaiacovo was considering retirement, but he said his break was to heal from injuries and "to take some time off so [he] could pursue [his] career a lot longer". Colaiacovo rejoined the Eagles on the ice in 2007, but later left Colorado to play in the Netherlands. After winning both the National Cup and Dutch Championship with Tilburg Trappers, Paulo returned to Canada to play for the Toronto organization on a 'black ace' contract.

On July 20, 2009, Colaiacovo signed a contract with the Bloomington PrairieThunder of the International Hockey League.

== Awards ==
- 2004 OHL All Star team member
- 2004 OHL Goaltender of the Year
- 2006 Central Hockey League All Star team member

== Statistics ==
Season	Team	League	GP	GA	EN	SO	GAA	W	L	T	Svs	Pct
2000-01	Belleville Bulls	OHL	32	88	1	1	3.25	15	7	3	782	.899
2001-02	Belleville Bulls	OHL	12	41	2	0	3.74	5	5	0	297	.879
2001-02	Barrie Colts	OHL	23	53	1	0	2.62	12	8	0	595	.918
2002-03	Barrie Colts	OHL	61	153	0	5	2.88	26	22	2	1600	.913
2003-04	Barrie Colts	OHL	58	131	0	4	2.34	24	21	12	1583	.924
2004-05	Colorado Eagles	CHL	10	18	0	2	1.80	8	1	1	255	.934
2005-06	Colorado Eagles	CHL	44	111	0	4	2.58	30	11	3	1226	.917
2007-08	Tilburg Trappers	Eredivisie	44									
2009-10	Bloomington Prairie Thunder	IHL	13	36	0	1	3.05	6	5	1	341	.905
