= History of the Edmonton Oilers =

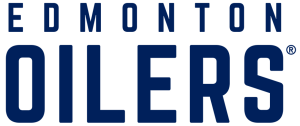

The history of the Edmonton Oilers dates back to 1972, when the team was established as a professional ice hockey team based in Edmonton, Alberta. The team originally played in the World Hockey Association (WHA), before joining the National Hockey League (NHL) in 1979. The team played its first season in 1972–73 as one of 12 founding franchises of the major professional World Hockey Association (WHA). They were originally supposed to be one of two WHA teams in Alberta (the other one being the Calgary Broncos). However, when the Broncos folded before the WHA's first season began, the Edmonton Oilers were renamed the Alberta Oilers. They returned to using the Edmonton Oilers name for the 1973–74 season, and have been called that ever since. The Oilers subsequently joined the NHL in 1979; one of four franchises introduced through the NHL merger with the WHA.

After joining the NHL, the Oilers went on to win the Stanley Cup on five occasions: 1984, 1985, 1987, 1988 and 1990. For their success in the 1980s, the Oilers team of this era has been honoured with "dynasty" status by the Hockey Hall of Fame. During the NHL Centennial Season celebrations, four of those Oiler Cup-winning teams were placed in the Top Ten NHL Teams of all time, including the 1984–85 Edmonton Oilers being voted the NHL's Greatest Team in its first 100 years.

== WHA years (1972–1979) ==
On November 1, 1971, the Edmonton Oilers became one of 12 founding World Hockey Association (WHA) franchises. The original team founders were "Wild" Bill Hunter and partner, Dr. Charles A. "Chuck" Allard (1919–1991) (who, a decade later, also brought the SCTV sketch comedy TV series to Edmonton). Hunter also owned the Edmonton Oil Kings, a junior hockey franchise, and founded the Canadian Major Junior Hockey League (now known as the Western Hockey League). However, Hunter's efforts to bring major professional hockey to Edmonton via an expansion NHL franchise had been rebuffed by the NHL. Therefore, Hunter looked to the upstart WHA instead. It was Hunter who chose the "Oilers" name for the new WHA franchise. This was a name that had previously been used as a nickname for the Edmonton Oil Kings in the 1950s and 1960s.

After the newly founded Calgary Broncos folded prior to commencement of the inaugural WHA season, the Oilers were renamed the Alberta Oilers as it was planned to split their home games between Edmonton and Calgary. Possibly for financial reasons or to allow for a less complicated return of the WHA to Calgary, the team ultimately played all of its home games in the Edmonton Gardens and subsequently changed its name back to the Edmonton Oilers the following year. They won the first game in WHA history 7–4 over the Ottawa Nationals.

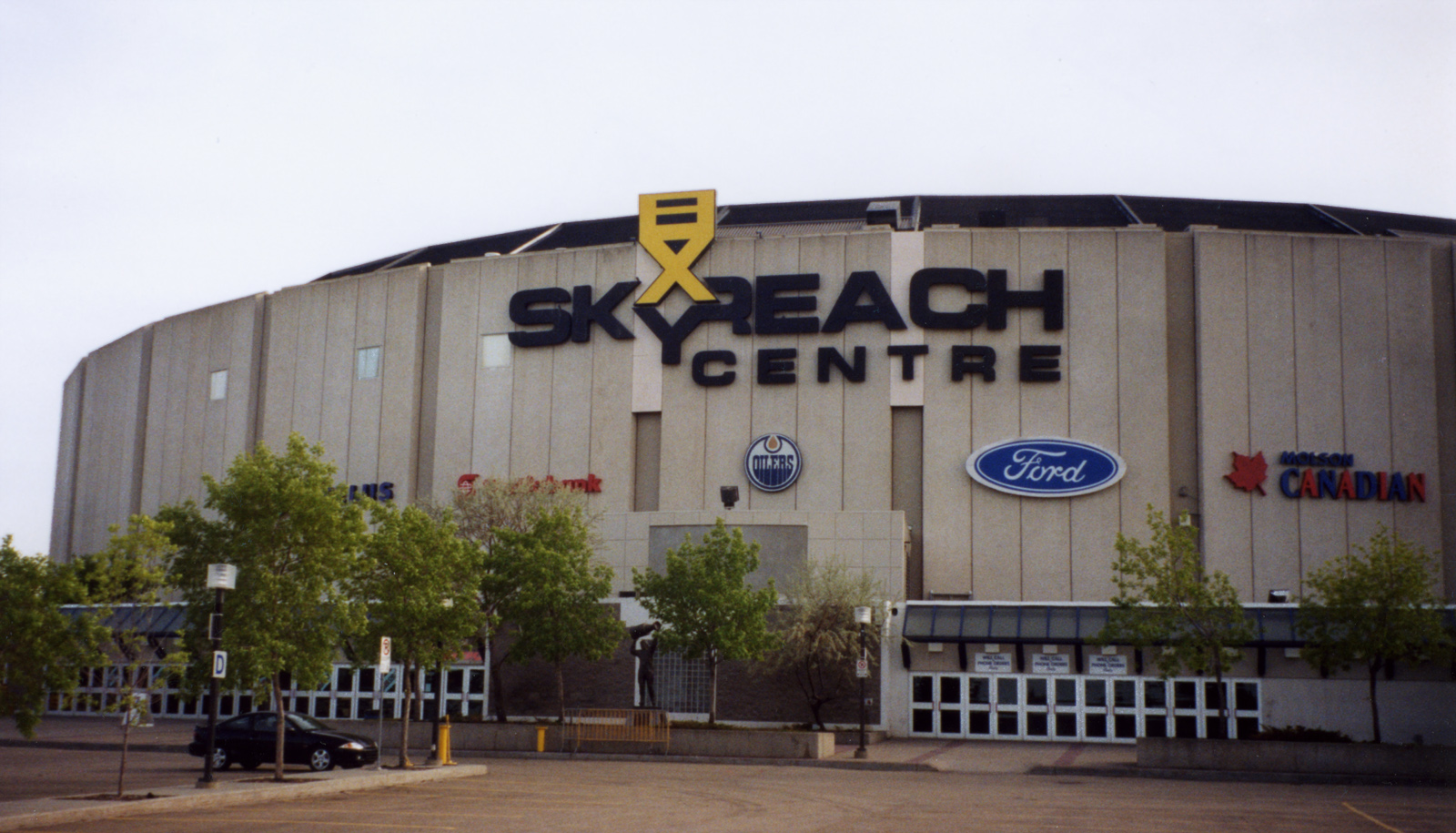
Northlands Coliseum in 2001 (then known as the Skyreach Centre). The venue served as the Oilers home arena from 1974 to 2016.

The Oilers drew fans with players such as defenceman and team captain Al Hamilton, goaltender Dave Dryden and forwards Blair MacDonald and Bill Flett. However, a relatively little-noticed move in 1976 would have an important impact on the history of the franchise. That year, journeyman forward Glen Sather was acquired by the Oilers. It turned out to be his final season as a player. However, he was named player-coach late in the season, moving to the bench full-time after the season. Sather would be the face of the franchise for the next 23 years as head coach and/or general manager.

In 1976, Hunter and Allard sold the franchise to Vancouver real estate tycoon Nelson Skalbania– then soon to become notorious for flipping both real and franchised properties –who quickly made local businessman Peter Pocklington a full partner, then sold his shares to him the following year. The team's fortunes improved dramatically in 1978 when, with new coach Sather playing a key role, Pocklington's Oilers acquired underage player Wayne Gretzky, as well as goaltender Eddie Mio and forward Peter Driscoll, for cash, from Skalbania's moribund Indianapolis Racers. Gretzky's first and only WHA season, consequentially, prevented him from being an official 1979–80 NHL rookie) and, in 1978–79, the Oilers finished first in WHA standings, posting a league-best 48–30–2 record. However, Edmonton failed to win the championship, as they fell to the Winnipeg Jets in the Avco World Trophy Final. Dave Semenko of the Oilers scored the last goal in WHA history late in the third period of the final game, which the Oilers lost 7–3.

The Oilers joined the National Hockey League (NHL) for 1979–80, along with fellow WHA teams Hartford Whalers, Quebec Nordiques and the Jets following a merger agreement between the two leagues. Of these four teams, only Edmonton has avoided relocation and renaming; the Nordiques became the Colorado Avalanche in 1995, the Jets became the Phoenix Coyotes in 1996 and the Whalers became the Carolina Hurricanes in 1997.

== Early years in the NHL (1979–1983) ==
The Oilers lost most of the players from 1978–79 when the NHL held a reclamation draft of players who had bolted to the upstart league. They were allowed to protect two goaltenders and two skill players. Originally, Gretzky was not eligible to be protected; under the rules of the time, he normally would have been placed in the entry draft pool.

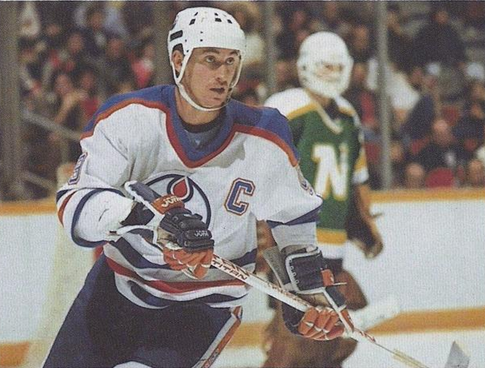
Wayne Gretzky in an Edmonton Oiler's jersey

However, Pocklington had signed him to a 21-year contract in 1979. Pocklington used the contract to force the NHL to admit the Oilers: he promised the league Gretzky would fill every arena, but that since he was under a personal services contract to Pocklington, the only way Gretzky would enter the NHL was as an Oiler. The NHL relented, allowing the Oilers to protect Gretzky.

In the expansion draft, Sather and general manager Larry Gordon carefully restocked the roster. Sather later said that out of 761 players on the draft list, only 53 really interested him. He concentrated on drafting free agents, since the Oilers would get compensation if they signed somewhere else. He estimated this saved the Oilers as much as $500,000 that could be used in the Entry Draft.

Upon joining the NHL, the Oilers were placed in the Campbell Conference's Smythe Division. They were mediocre during the regular season in their first two seasons, finishing 16th and 14th respectively. However, due to the fact 16 of the 21 NHL teams made the playoffs at the time, the Oilers were still able to get their young players experience in the playoffs (they would make the playoffs for their first 13 years in the NHL). The Oilers would be swept by the Philadelphia Flyers in the first round of the 1980 playoffs, but in 1981, the Oilers would stun the hockey world with a three-game sweep of the heavily favoured Montreal Canadiens before losing in six games to the New York Islanders. However, because the top of the draft order at the time was determined by regular season standing, the Oilers still held premium draft picks. This allowed the Oilers to put together a young, talented, experienced team quickly. Within three years, Sather and chief scout Barry Fraser had drafted several players who would have an important role in the team's success, including Mark Messier, Glenn Anderson, Jari Kurri, Paul Coffey, Kevin Lowe, Grant Fuhr and Andy Moog.

In 1981–82, the Oilers rocketed up the standings, finishing with the second-best record in the NHL, behind only the Islanders. However, they took a pratfall in the first round of the playoffs when they were upset by the Los Angeles Kings in five games (game three of this series, now known as the "Miracle on Manchester", saw the Oilers take a 5–0 lead, only to lose 6–5 to the Kings in overtime). However, in the next season, the Oilers finished third overall advanced to the Stanley Cup Final (losing only once in the process) before getting swept by the New York Islanders. During this season, Gretzky, Messier, Anderson and Kurri all topped the 100-point plateau, with Coffey not far behind at 96. After the season, Lee Fogolin resigned as captain of the Oilers, picking Gretzky as his successor.

During this period, Wayne Gretzky began setting new NHL records. In his first season, he was ruled ineligible for the Calder Memorial Trophy (rookie of the year) (because of his previous WHA experience) and the Art Ross Trophy (NHL scoring leader) (although Gretzky tied with Marcel Dionne of the Los Angeles Kings in points, Dionne won the trophy on the basis of scoring two more goals). However, Gretzky still managed to win his first of an NHL record eight consecutive and nine total Hart Trophies. Next season, Gretzky quickly made up for not winning the Art Ross Trophy by winning his first of an NHL record seven straight and ten total. He easily won the Art Ross by setting new single season records for assists (with 109) and points (with 164). In 1981–82, Gretzky set the single season record for goals with 92. Also, he became the first player in NHL history to score 200 points (with 212). After the season, he won his first of a record four consecutive and five total Lester B. Pearson Awards (NHL MVP as selected by NHL players). Gretzky wasn't the only player to set a record during this time; Grant Fuhr set an NHL goaltender rookie record in 1981–82 by going undefeated in twenty-three straight games. Also, the Oilers became the first NHL team to score 400 goals in a season, a feat they would accomplish for five straight years.

== Dynasty years (1983–1990) ==
In 1983–84, the Oilers roared through the regular season, finishing with the best record in the NHL for the first time in their history. They won franchise record 57 games and earning 119 points (15 points ahead of the second place Islanders). They scored 446 total goals, a record that still stands. Gretzky broke the 200 point barrier for the second time in his career; the Oilers also became the first team in NHL history to have 3 players score more than 50 goals: Gretzky (87), Kurri (54), and Anderson (52). Finally, Paul Coffey became the second defenceman in NHL history to score 40 goals in one season. He finished with 126 points.

In the Smythe Division semi-finals, the Oilers swept the Winnipeg Jets. In the division finals, the Oilers faced a tougher challenge from the Calgary Flames, but ultimately prevailed in Game 7, disposing of their provincial rivals 7–4 after trailing 4–3 midway through the second period. After sweeping the Minnesota North Stars in the conference finals, the Oilers earned a rematch with the Islanders in the Stanley Cup Final. The Oilers split the first two games in Long Island, but then won three in a row in Edmonton to become the first former WHA team to win the Stanley Cup, as well as the first Western Canadian team to win the Cup in 59 years. After the series, Mark Messier was awarded the Conn Smythe Trophy as playoff MVP.

Eight Oilers were selected to compete for Canada at the 1984 Canada Cup. As a result, the Oilers were not as overwhelming in the 1984–85 season as they had been in the previous year. The team did not push as hard in the regular season, trying to stay as fresh as possible, and Sather even took a week's vacation to Hawaii in the middle of the season. Still, the Oilers finished second overall in the NHL with 49 wins and 109 points, four behind the Philadelphia Flyers. Gretzky scored the 1,000th point of his career in only his 424th game en route to an NHL-leading 73-goal, 208-point season. Kurri also topped the 70-goal plateau, finishing with 71 goals and 135 points. Paul Coffey had his second straight 120-point season, finishing with 37 goals and 121 points.

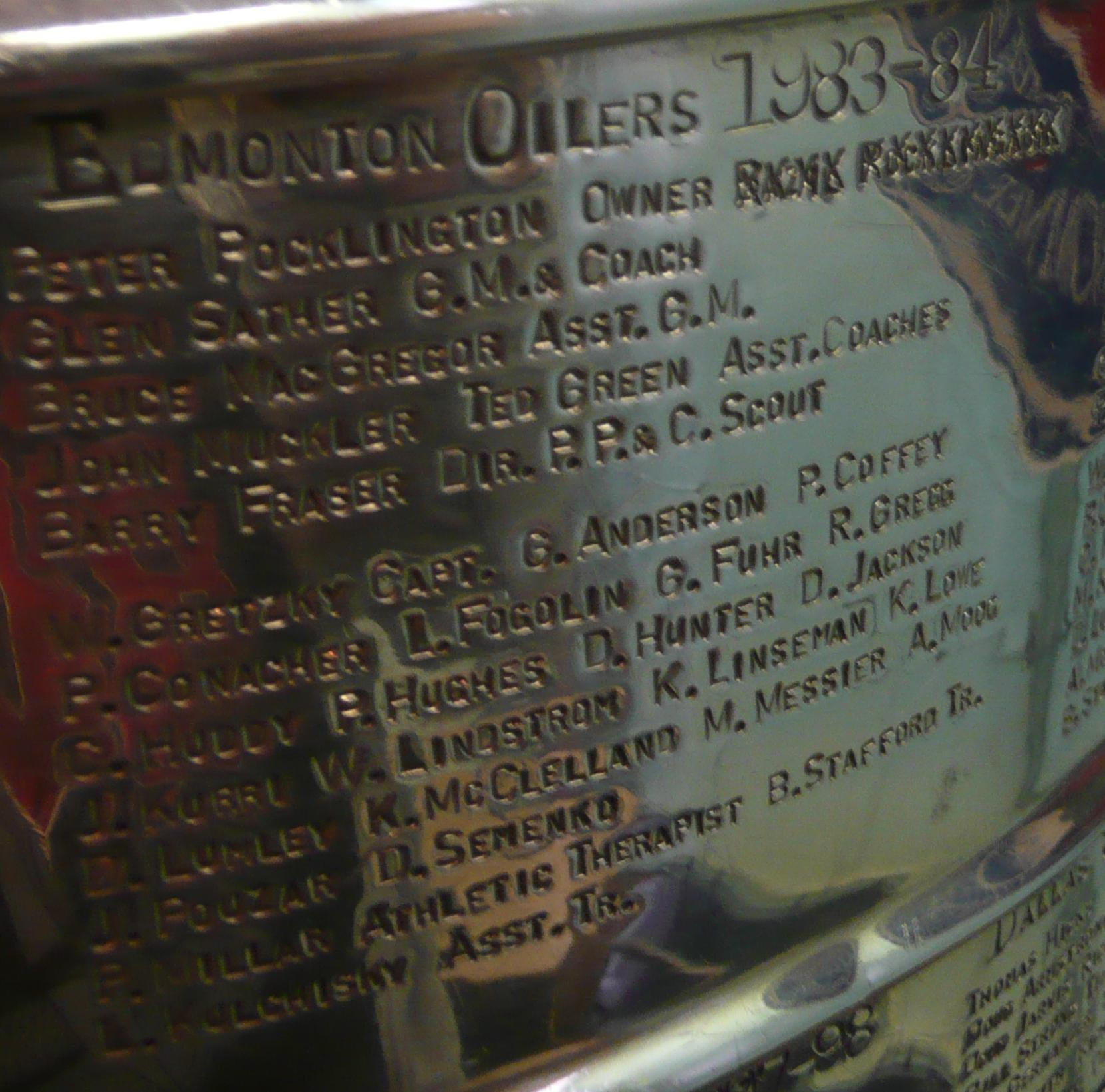
A close-up view of the engravings for the 1983–84 Edmonton Oilers, winners of the 1984 Stanley Cup.

In the playoffs, the Oilers swept the Los Angeles Kings in three games in the opening round and the Winnipeg Jets in the division finals. The team met the Chicago Blackhawks in the Campbell Conference Finals, jumping out to a 2–0 series lead and extending their playoff win streak to nine games. Chicago, stressing physical and agitating play to slow the Oilers' attack, tied the series on home ice before the Oilers won the last two games to finish the series in six. The Oilers scored 44 goals against the Blackhawks, an NHL record for one team in a single playoff series that still stands. In the Stanley Cup Final, the Oilers overpowered the Flyers in five games. Kurri tied Reggie Leach's record for goals in one playoff year with 19. Coffey set a new record for playoff points in a season by a defenceman with 37, but it was Gretzky with the highest numbers of all, scoring a playoff record 47 points and registering a staggering +28 in only 18 playoff games. For his efforts Gretzky was awarded the Conn Smythe Trophy, but Coffey and Fuhr were also considered strong candidates. Jari Kurri won the Lady Byng Memorial Trophy, and Paul Coffey captured the first James Norris Memorial Trophy of his career. Gretzky, Kurri and Coffey were all named to the NHL's First All-Star Team. During the NHL Centennial Season celebrations, the 1984–85 Edmonton Oilers were voted the NHL's Greatest Team of its first 100 years.

The Oilers were indeed a juggernaut that the entire NHL feared, but the off-ice antics of some players began tarnishing the team's image by the time the 1985–86 season got underway. In June 1985, Dave Hunter was charged with impaired driving. He was later convicted in February 1986 and sentenced to one week in jail, which he served in the middle of the season. Then on September 6, 1985, Mark Messier lost control of his Porsche and totalled it by hitting three parked cars. He was later charged with hit and run and careless driving, for which he paid a fine. In addition, the Oilers acquired Craig MacTavish, a talented defensive centre from Boston, who had just served a year in jail for vehicular homicide. In spite of the distractions, the Oilers were again the top team in the NHL during the regular season, with 56 wins and 119 points. They won the inaugural Presidents' Trophy, the trophy given to the team with the best regular-season record. Gretzky set a new NHL record for points with 215, and amassed a new league record 163 assists. Jari Kurri led the NHL in goals with 68, finishing with 131 points, and Paul Coffey set a new record for goals by a defenceman with 48. He finished with 138 points, one point behind the all-time record for defencemen set by Bobby Orr. Additionally, the Oilers matched a record they set in 1983–84 with three players who scored more than 50 goals: Kurri (68), Glenn Anderson (54) and Gretzky (52).

The Oilers overpowered the Vancouver Canucks in the divisional semi-finals, sweeping the series 3–0 and outscoring the Canucks 17–5. The Oilers faced their most bitter rival in the division finals, the Calgary Flames. In a physical and sometimes dirty series, in which Flames' enforcer Nick Fotiu actually tried to climb into the Oilers' bench to get at Glen Sather, the Oilers and Flames fought a classic series through the first six games, with the deciding game to be played April 30, 1986, at Northlands Coliseum. Shockingly, the Oilers' bid for a third straight championship—"three-peat"—came to an end. In the third period of a 2–2 tie, on his 23rd birthday, rookie defenceman Steve Smith banked his breakout pass off goaltender Grant Fuhr's left skate and into the Oilers' net. Despite a late flurry, the Oilers were unable to tie the score and the own goal stood as the game-and-series-winning goal. As it turned out, it would be the only time the Oilers lost a playoff series to their provincial rivals in the decade. After the season, the Oilers' players again won several awards: Wayne Gretzky won his seventh straight Hart Trophy, along with his sixth straight scoring title. Paul Coffey won his second consecutive Norris Trophy, and Glen Sather took home the Jack Adams Award as the NHL's Coach of the Year. Gretzky and Coffey were named to the First All-Star Team, and Kurri was named to the Second All-Star Team.

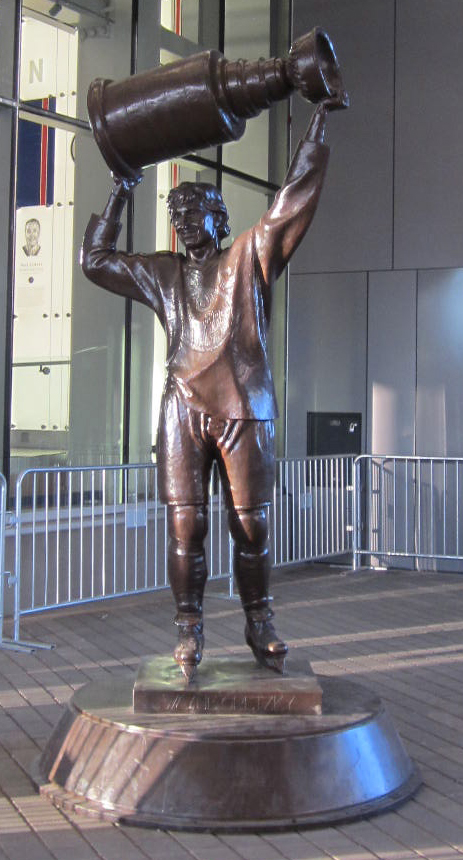
A statue of Wayne Gretzky hoisting the Stanley Cup. Gretzky won four Stanley Cups with the Oilers during the 1980s.

In the May 12, 1986, issue of Sports Illustrated, an article was published alleging more problems with the off-ice activities of the Oilers. The article, written by Armen Keteyian and Donald Ramsay, suggested five team members had "substantial" cocaine problems. Citing sources from around the NHL and from the RCMP's Edmonton Drug Unit, alleges rampant drug use within the team, a high-pressure citywide environment that put immense pressure on players, and a culture of ensuring the players' drinking problems remained under wraps. The financial problems of certain players were also brought up, most notably those of Grant Fuhr. The Hockey News ran a responding article in which Sather called the allegations innuendo. NHL President John Ziegler and NHL Players' Association President Alan Eagleson dismissed the story as "McCarthyism". Sports Illustrated stood by its story; suddenly, the Oilers' organization had an image problem to fight. After already being tarnished by the Messier and Hunter episodes in the last year, they were now widely suspected of rampant drug use.

The 1986–87 season saw the Oilers come together as a team, determined to recapture the Stanley Cup. Except for a poor record against the Flames, Edmonton again dominated the regular season, finishing first overall with 50 wins and 106 points, six points ahead of second-place Philadelphia. The team captured its second consecutive Presidents' Trophy, and last to date. Wayne Gretzky (62 goals and 183 points) and Jari Kurri (54 goals and 108 points) finished first and second in the NHL scoring race. Mark Messier (37 goals and 107 points) finished fourth. Paul Coffey missed 21 games with injuries but still managed 67 points. The season was notable for the deteriorating relationship between Coffey and head coach Glen Sather. The relationship was laced with antagonism for most of the season, and Coffey believed he was the victim of a double standard in treatment of the players. At the 1987 NHL trade deadline, the Oilers acquired Kent Nilsson in exchange for a second-round draft pick in 1988, which solidified Edmonton's top two lines in time for the playoffs.

In the opening round of the playoffs, the Oilers lost their first game to Los Angeles before winning the next four straight. Game 2 saw the Oilers establish a new NHL record for playoff goals in a single game with 13. The Oilers faced the Winnipeg Jets in the Smythe Division Finals, and Grant Fuhr was the big star in what became an Edmonton sweep. In the conference finals against the Detroit Red Wings, the Oilers again lost the first game on home ice before rebounding to win the next four. Edmonton returned to the Stanley Cup Final and faced the same opponent as they had in 1985, the Philadelphia Flyers. Though the Oilers dominated the territorial play and shot counts in the series, the goaltending of Flyers' rookie Ron Hextall brought the Flyers back from a 3–1 series deficit and set up a decisive Game 7 at Northlands Coliseum. In the game, the Oilers fired 43 shots at Hextall: Oiler stars Messier, Kurri and Anderson were able to solve Hextall for a goal apiece, and for perhaps the first time in franchise history, the Oilers clamped down on defence; the more mature Edmonton squad held the Flyers to just two shots in the third period, and a total of 20 in the game, en route to a convincing 3–1 victory. In the post-game celebration, Gretzky immediately passed the Stanley Cup to Steve Smith, now vindicated after his costly miscue the previous season. Gretzky led the playoffs in scoring with 34 points and Kurri led in goals with 15. However, the Conn Smythe Trophy was awarded to the Flyers' Hextall: it was only the fourth time in NHL history that the Conn Smythe Trophy was awarded to a player on the losing side. The Oilers again collected several awards after the season. Gretzky claimed his eighth Hart Trophy as most valuable player in only his eighth year in the NHL, along with his seventh straight Art Ross Trophy. Gretzky also captured the 5th and final Lester B. Pearson award of his career, along with his third career Plus-Minus Award. Gretzky and Kurri were named to the NHL's First All-Star Team.

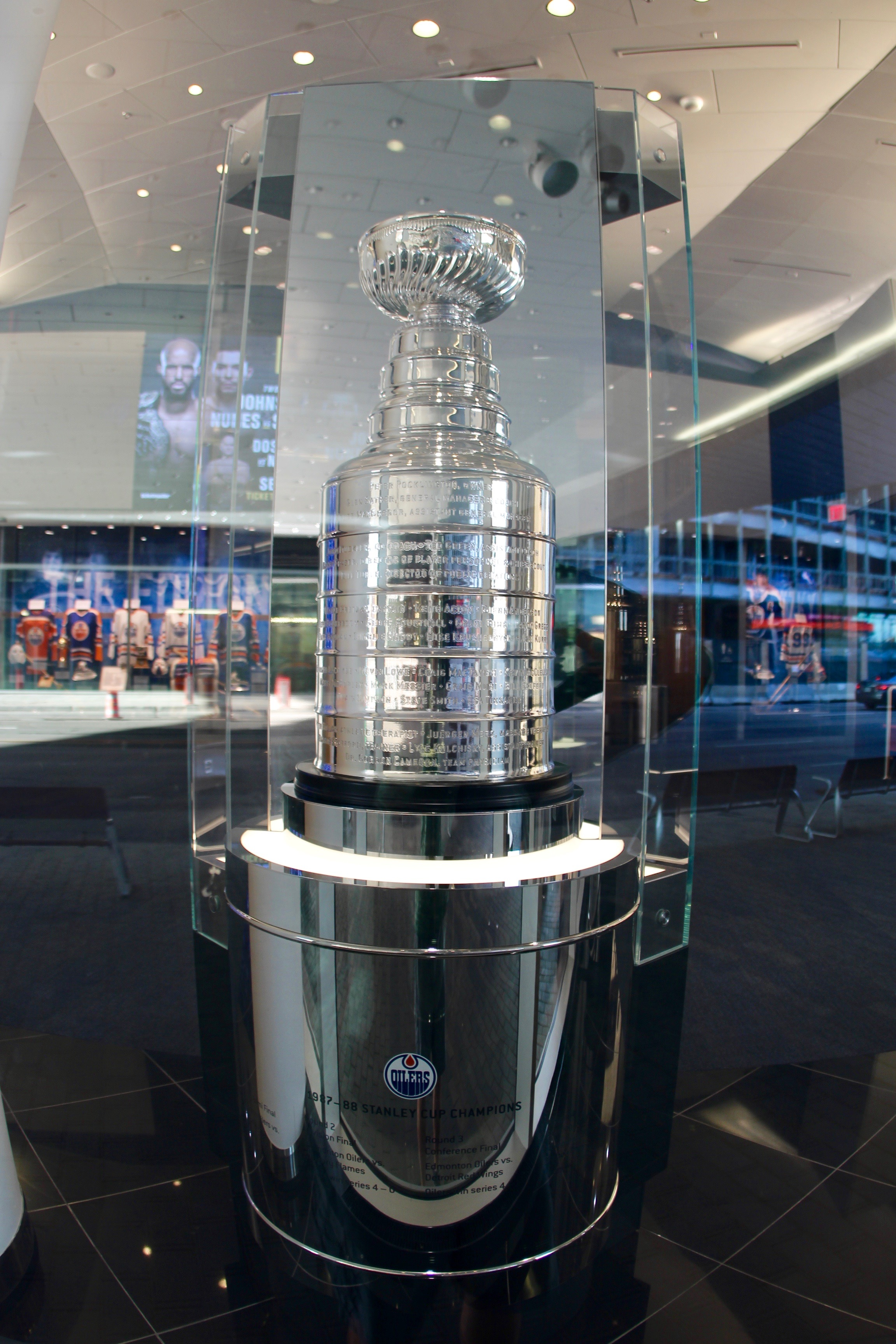
A replica Stanley Cup. The names of members from the 1987–88 Oilers team are engraved on its sides.

Seven Oilers (five for Canada, two for Finland) took part in the 1987 Canada Cup. When training camps for the 1987–88 season opened, several Oilers' players were MIA. Mark Messier missed all of training camp while his contract was renegotiated. Glenn Anderson failed to report until the season started, and Paul Coffey did not report at all, unhappy with both his contract and his treatment by the club. Mike Krushelnyski was unhappy with his ice-time and skipped training camp. Kent Nilsson and Reijo Ruotsalainen both decided to play the season in Europe. Andy Moog also refused to report: he no longer wanted to play backup to Grant Fuhr and instead joined the Canadian Olympic Team. He was later joined by Randy Gregg. Eventually, Sather dealt away the first of his great players. Paul Coffey was the centrepiece of a multi-player deal with the Pittsburgh Penguins. Among the players Edmonton received in return was young left-winger Craig Simpson, who was brought in to play alongside Messier and Anderson. Simpson finished the season with 56 goals, the second-highest total in the league. Eventually, Andy Moog was dealt to the Boston Bruins for speedy winger Geoff Courtnall and promising young goaltender Bill Ranford. Without Coffey's offence on the point, and missing Gretzky for 16 games during the season with injury, and perhaps continuing the Canada Cup trend from 1985, the Oilers' regular season was not an impressive one by their standards. Wayne Gretzky lost the scoring title outright for the first time in his career, finishing with 149 points to Mario Lemieux's 168. (Gretzky's points-per-game average was still higher than Lemieux's, however.) In addition, the Oilers' drive for a seventh consecutive Smythe Division title was stymied, and they were dethroned by their provincial rivals, the Flames, who also won the Presidents' Trophy. The Oilers finished the season with 44 wins and 99 points, good for 3rd place overall in the NHL. For the first time in six years, the Oilers did not score the most goals in the league. They amassed 363 goals, second to the Flames' 397. However, one bright spot on the team was the play of Grant Fuhr. He started an NHL-record 75 games, posting a team-record 40 wins. Mark Messier placed seventh in the NHL scoring race with 37 goals and 111 points.

In the first round of the playoffs, the Oilers dispatched of the third place Winnipeg Jets in five games. Next up was a looming showdown with Calgary, and hockey experts almost unanimously predicted a Flames' victory. However, the series became an Edmonton sweep, with Gretzky notching his second career playoff overtime winner in Game 2. In the Campbell Conference Finals against the Detroit Red Wings, the Oilers again prevailed in five games, matching their total from the previous year. In the final series against the Boston Bruins, Gretzky turned in a virtuoso performance: he set a new NHL record for points in the Stanley Cup Final with 13, and the Oilers swept the Bruins 4–0. A notable event in Finals history occurred in Game 4 on May 24. With the score tied 3–3 in the second period, a power outage hit the Boston Garden, forcing cancellation of the whole game. NHL President John Ziegler ordered the game to be rescheduled, and, if necessary, played in Boston after the originally scheduled Game 7 in Edmonton. The Oilers won the next game (originally scheduled as Game 5) back in Edmonton 6–3 to complete the series sweep, and capture the team's fourth Stanley Cup in five years. All player statistics accrued in the aborted Game 4 in Boston are counted in the NHL record books. Wayne Gretzky led all playoff scorers with 43 points, including an NHL-record 31 assists, in 19 games. For his efforts, he was awarded the second Conn Smythe Trophy of his career. After the Cup-clinching game, Gretzky implored his teammates, coaches, trainers and others from the Oilers organization to join at centre ice for an impromptu team photo with the Stanley Cup, a tradition since continued by every subsequent Stanley Cup Champion. After the season, Fuhr was awarded the Vezina Trophy as the NHL's top goaltender. Fuhr was also selected to the first All-Star Team, and Gretzky was selected to the Second All-Star Team.

The 1988 Oilers team established a record in the modern Stanley Cup era with a playoffs win percentage of .889. In addition, a Sporting News poll conducted in February 2006 listed the 1988 team as one of the top five professional sports teams of the past 120 years.

During the 1988 off-season, rumors swirled around the Oilers that Gretzky was going to be traded prior to the start of the next season. On August 9, 1988, Gretzky (along with enforcer Marty McSorley and centre Mike Krushelnyski) were traded to the Los Angeles Kings. In exchange, the Oilers received US$15 million, young star Jimmy Carson, 1988 first-round draft pick Martin Gelinas and the Kings' first round draft picks in 1989, 1991 and 1993. Pocklington's image took an incredible tumble after the trade: he was burned in effigy in Edmonton, and the federal New Democratic Party asked the government to act and block the trade. The Oilers traded the 1989 pick (Jason Miller) to the New Jersey Devils for defenceman Corey Foster, then used the 1991 and 1993 picks to select Martin Rucinsky and Nick Stajduhar, respectively. Rucinsky went on to a respectable NHL career after being dealt to the Quebec Nordiques, and Stajduhar only played two games in the NHL.

Gretzky's departure from the Oilers was acrimonious: he had asked the Oilers to renegotiate his contract in 1987, and he converted his personal-services contract with Pocklington into a standard five-year player's contract with the Oilers in the summer of 1987. According to the ESPN 30 for 30 series, Gretzky had the option to declare himself an unrestricted free agent after the 1988–89 season. This meant he could opt out of the last three years of his contract and, according to Gretzky, he would be allowed to sign with the highest bidder for his services with no compensation to the Oilers. Pocklington allowed Los Angeles owner Bruce McNall to contact Gretzky on his honeymoon to see if he was interested in relocating to Southern California. During the 1988 season, Pocklington approached Gretzky about renegotiating the contract, knowing if Gretzky went to free agency, he would be unable to match offers from richer teams such as the Toronto Maple Leafs and New York Rangers. Pocklington told Gretzky it could mean his departure from the team, but Gretzky, unwilling to give up his chance at free agency, refused to blink, which ultimately led to the trade. None of this was public knowledge at the time, but Pocklington did not want to risk Gretzky leaving town without getting anything in return.

The trade was viewed as disastrous for the Oilers. Several of the Oilers considered launching a teamwide strike and even considered demanding that Pocklington sell the team. Since the trade was announced after the Oilers' season ticket drive for 1988–89 closed, attendance was not impacted in the first season after Gretzky's departure, but would noticeably decline in subsequent seasons.

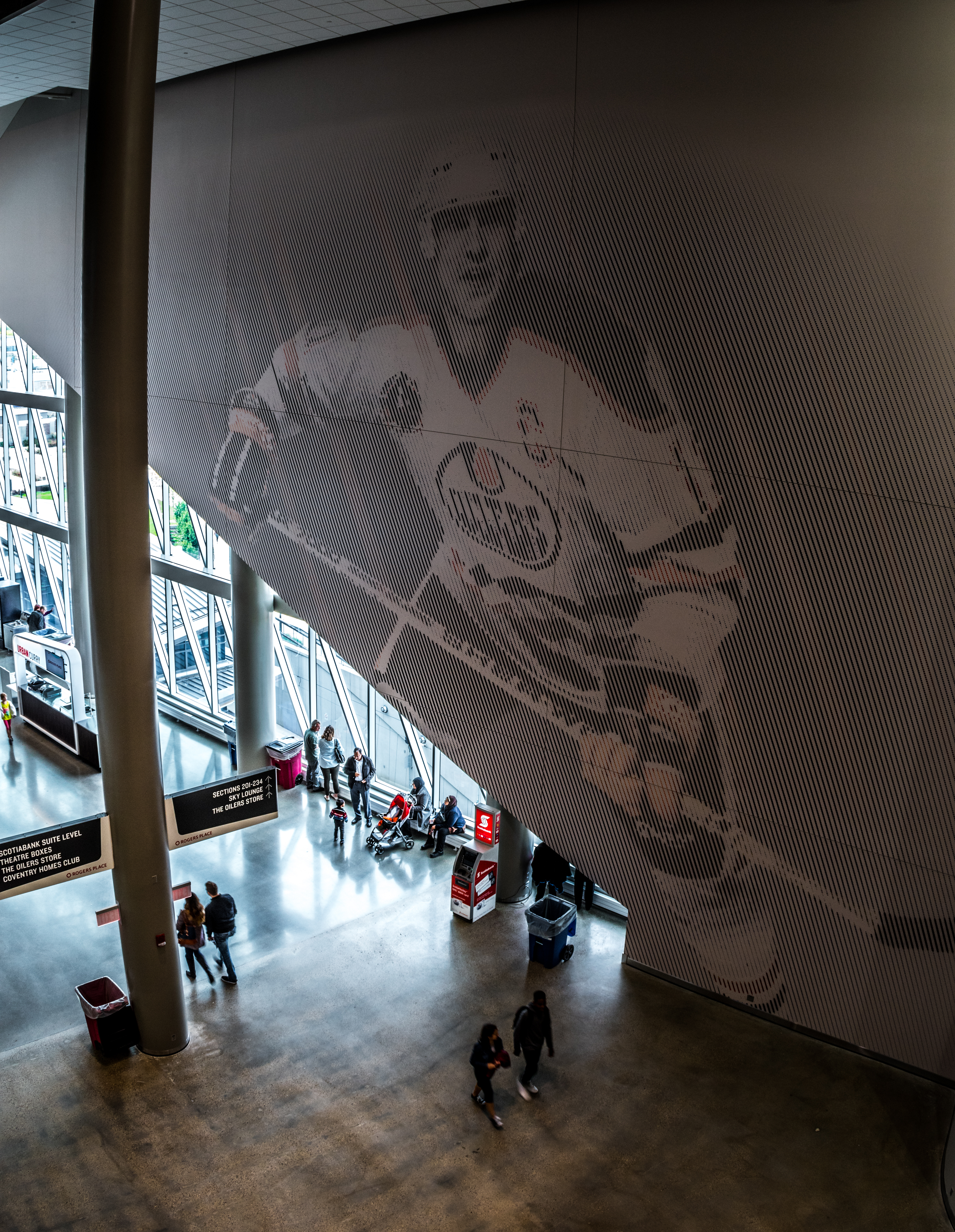
A mural of Mark Messier as the Oilers' captain at Rogers Place. He served as the team captain from 1988 to 1991.

The 1988–89 season was tumultuous in Edmonton. Mark Messier was chosen to succeed Gretzky as captain. The Oilers plummeted in the standings, finishing with 38 wins and 84 points. They finished third in the Smythe Division, behind the juggernaut Calgary Flames and the reborn Los Angeles Kings, led by Gretzky. In February, the Oilers acquired enforcer Dave Brown from Philadelphia, a move that made the Oilers a more fearsome team physically. Jari Kurri led the team with 44 goals and 58 assists for 102 points, proving his worth as an offensive player without Gretzky. Carson, acquired in the Gretzky trade, led the team with 49 goals and was the only other Oiler to hit the 100-point plateau. Messier led the team in assists with 61, and defenceman Craig Muni led the team in plus-minus with a +43.

Ironically, the Oilers' first round opponent was Gretzky's Los Angeles Kings. The eyes of the hockey world focused on this match-up as Edmonton took a commanding 3–1 series lead. But Gretzky and the Kings fought back to force Game 7, which culminated with the Oilers losing 6–3 in Los Angeles. It was the first time since 1982 that the Oilers had been eliminated after only one round. Messier led the team in playoff scoring with 12 points in 7 games. Further proving his critics wrong, Kurri was selected to the Second All-Star Team at the end of the season.

Following the 1989 season, Glen Sather stepped down as head coach. He remained on as president and general manager, turning the coaching duties over to longtime assistant John Muckler. During training camp for the 1989–90 season, Grant Fuhr came down with a severe case of appendicitis. He missed the first ten games of the season, and when he returned he suffered a shoulder injury that sidelined him for the remainder of the season. This marked the emergence of Bill Ranford as a starter. Four games into the season, Jimmy Carson decided the pressure of playing in Edmonton was too intense and walked out on the team. Sather dealt Carson to Detroit, his home town, in exchange for Petr Klima, Adam Graves, Joe Murphy and Jeff Sharples. (Sharples would later be traded to New Jersey to re-acquire Reijo Ruotsalainen.) The trade allowed the Oilers to form a modern-day version of the "Kid Line", with Graves at centre, Murphy on right wing and Martin Gelinas on left wing. The season was up and down for the Oilers: they improved on their previous season, finishing with 38 wins and 90 points, good for fifth place overall in the NHL. The season is notable for the emergence of Mark Messier as an acknowledged elite player: he led the team with 45 goals and 84 assists for 129 points, finishing second in the NHL scoring race. Randy Gregg led the team with a +24, despite only playing 48 games.

In the first round, the Oilers faced the Winnipeg Jets. The Jets proved gritty and hungry and took a big lead in the series. Trailing the series 3–1 and trailing Game 5 by the identical score, the Oilers miraculously rallied to force Game 6 at the Winnipeg Arena, where Kurri scored the game winner in front of a hostile Winnipeg crowd. Game 7 was won by the Oilers, 4–1. In the division finals, the Oilers met the Los Angeles Kings for the second straight season. The result would be different from in 1989, however, as Edmonton swept the series 4–0, outscoring Los Angeles 22–10. The Oilers met the Chicago Blackhawks in the Campbell Conference Finals and fell behind 2–1 in the series. In Game 4 at Chicago Stadium, Messier ran roughshod all over the Blackhawks, slashing, elbowing and throwing thunderous checks. Messier finished the game with two goals and one assist in a 4–2 Edmonton victory, and his performance has been called "one of the most terrifying one-man-wrecking-crew performances in hockey history". The Oilers tied the series and won the next two games, winning the series and setting up a rematch of the 1988 Stanley Cup Final with Boston. This series will be remembered for the outstanding goaltending of Bill Ranford, and for Game 1 of the series which still stands as the longest Stanley Cup Final game played in the modern NHL. Despite being soundly outshot by the Bruins, the Oilers won the game 3–2 when Petr Klima scored on a wrist shot from the right-side boards at 15:13 of the third overtime. In Game 2, the Oilers were outshot 10–2 in the first period, but Ranford held tough and the Oilers led 2–1. Then Jari Kurri took over: on his 30th birthday, Kurri scored three goals and two assists in what became a 7–2 Edmonton win. In Game 3 at Northlands Coliseum, the Bruins set a new NHL record by scoring ten seconds into a Stanley Cup Final game, and never looked back in cruising to a 2–1 victory. Game 4 was dominated by the Oilers' top line of Messier, Anderson and Simpson, as the trio accounted for 4 goals and 11 points in a 5–1 Edmonton victory. Game 5 at the Boston Garden saw Bill Ranford stop 29 of 30 shots, and Glenn Anderson score a goal and an assist in leading the Oilers to a 4–1 win. The team had captured its fifth Stanley Cup championship in seven seasons. For his superlative goaltending, Bill Ranford was awarded the Conn Smythe Trophy, but Esa Tikkanen, Kurri and Messier were all strong candidates. Simpson led the playoffs in goals with 16, and he and Messier shared the points lead with 31. The Oilers again collected multiple awards after the season. Kevin Lowe won the King Clancy Memorial Trophy for his charity work in Edmonton, and Mark Messier won the first Hart Trophy of his career. Messier's closest competition for the award was Boston's Ray Bourque, and he edged Bourque in voting by a single first-place vote. Further proving he had stepped out of the shadow of Wayne Gretzky, Messier was selected to the First All-Star Team, over Gretzky who was named to the Second All-Star Team, in the position of centreman.

In all, seven players were a member of every Edmonton Stanley Cup team: Mark Messier, Glenn Anderson, Jari Kurri, Kevin Lowe, Randy Gregg, Charlie Huddy and Grant Fuhr. The Oilers' record during this time period was 332–166–62 (.648), and their record in the playoffs was 87–28 (.757). They set more records, too. Gretzky scored at least a point in 51-straight games in 1983–84, an NHL record.

== Transitional years (1990–1996) ==
The trade of Wayne Gretzky, and the immediate salary increase he got in Los Angeles, led to a far greater awareness of money matters among players. That, combined with the NHLPA's decision to fully disclose salaries of every player in the NHL, led to a new reality of rapidly climbing salaries in the NHL. This reality began to assert itself over Edmonton in the summer of 1990. Mark Messier, after winning the Hart Trophy the previous season, sought to have his contract renegotiated. Messier wanted his salary doubled from his current $1.1 million annually to around $2 million per season, putting him ahead of everyone in the NHL with the exception of Wayne Gretzky and Mario Lemieux. Messier was actually under contract to the Oilers until 1993: still, this did not stop his agent and father, Doug Messier, from pressing Sather for a new deal. Jari Kurri, unhappy with the Oilers' offer, did not report to training camp: he chose instead to play the entire season with HC Milano in Italy. Glenn Anderson, who had two more years left on his eight-year contract, held out of training camp as well, although he returned once the season started.

=== 1990–1991 ===
Randy Gregg was waived prior to the season starting, and he chose to retire rather than report to the Vancouver Canucks, the team that claimed him. Grant Fuhr was suspended for the entire season: he admitted in an Edmonton Journal article he had a long involvement with drugs, and that he had visited a Florida clinic in 1989 for two weeks to clean himself up (Fuhr has stayed off drugs since that visit). Messier was among the most vocal critics of the suspension: he felt it unfair that Fuhr, who sought help on his own for the problem, might have his career ended by the suspension, and that it may prevent other players with similar problems from coming forward and getting help. In mid-season, NHL President John Ziegler announced Fuhr's suspension had been shortened to 60 games. The season itself was not a great one for the Oilers: they finished with 37 wins and 80 points, good for third place in the Smythe Division. Esa Tikkanen led the team in scoring with 69 points, one ahead of Petr Klima, who led the team with 40 goals. Klima also led the team with a +24. Messier, hobbled by injuries, played only 53 games, but still managed to score 64 points.

In the playoffs, the Oilers met the Calgary Flames in the opening round. This series is viewed by many as the greatest Stanley Cup playoff series ever played. The teams split the first two games in Calgary, during which Messier flattened Calgary defenceman Ric Nattress with a vicious elbow. Games 3 and 4, in Edmonton, were both won by the Oilers. Game 4, a 5–2 Edmonton win, is remembered for the viciousness of a brawl near the end of the game, where Dave Brown, in a fight with Flame Jim Kyte, tried to pummel Kyte into the ice. The Oilers returned to Calgary with a 3–1 series lead, but the Flames fought back to force Game 6, which was won by Calgary in overtime on a goal by Theoren Fleury. The Flames jumped out to a 3–0 lead in Game 7, and the Oilers called an early timeout, during which Tikkanen chewed out the entire bench. Inspired by the speech, Edmonton fought back and ended up winning 5–4 in overtime on a wrist-shot from Tikkanen on his off-wing. It was Tikkanen's third goal of the game, and seventh of the series. The Oilers had suffered several injuries in the series with Calgary, and they met Los Angeles in the next round. The first three games of the series were all decided in overtime, and the Oilers held a 3–2 series lead heading into Game 6 at Northlands Coliseum. The Oilers again won in overtime, on the heroics of Craig MacTavish. In the Campbell Conference Finals against the Minnesota North Stars, the Oilers ran out of gas: after splitting the first two games in Edmonton, the North Stars won both games on home ice: the Stars repeatedly slashed Messier on his injured hand, though no penalties were called. Game 5 in Edmonton was close, but the Stars prevailed 3–2 to win the series 4–1 and go to the Stanley Cup Final. Tikkanen led the team in scoring in the playoffs with 10 goals and 20 points. First-year Oilers Anatoli Semenov and Norm Maciver proved to be revelations in the playoffs. Semenov finished with 10 points in 12 playoff games, and Maciver led the team with a +10 in 18 playoff games.

=== Mass exodus (1991–1992) ===
Four Oilers (three for Canada, one for Finland) took part in the 1991 Canada Cup. But the tournament was overshadowed by news reports that the Oilers were going to break up the remainder of their championship core. Rumours surfaced that both Mark Messier and Glenn Anderson were on the trade bloc, and Adam Graves signed an offer sheet from the New York Rangers, which Glen Sather chose not to match: the Oilers were awarded Rangers' enforcer Troy Mallette as compensation. (Graves went on to become a 50-goal scorer in New York, while Mallette only played 15 games in Edmonton.) Tikkanen was apoplectic, and Messier, upset that the Oilers were willing to let Graves walk, issued a public trade demand during the Canada Cup tournament, saying if the Oilers were not willing to do what was necessary to keep important players, he did not want to be there either. (Graves never scored more than nine goals in a season in Edmonton. Sather lamented in 1994 that if he knew how Graves would turn out, he would never have let him walk.)

John Muckler resigned to become head coach and general manager of the Buffalo Sabres. Assistant coach Ted Green was promoted to head coach. When the Canada Cup ended, the Oilers again had several no-shows for training camp. Tikkanen went home to Finland: after his great playoff, he demanded a renegotiated contract worth $1 million per season. Anderson stayed out, trying to either force a huge raise or get out of town. Craig Simpson stayed out, also negotiating a new contract. Grant Fuhr showed up to training camp, although it was publicly acknowledged he was available in trade offers. Partway through training camp, Fuhr and Anderson were traded to Toronto in exchange for Vincent Damphousse, Luke Richardson, Scott Thornton and Peter Ing. Then Steve Smith, also asking for a hefty raise, was dealt to Chicago for Dave Manson. The Oilers acquired Scott Mellanby from Philadelphia for Dave Brown, who asked to be traded back to the Flyers, and the rights to Jari Kurri, who was subsequently dealt to Los Angeles. Charlie Huddy was left exposed in the waiver draft, and was claimed by Minnesota. He, too, was immediately dealt to Los Angeles.

Messier stayed at his off-season home in Hilton Head Island, South Carolina, awaiting a trade. (Messier, a native Edmontonian, had actually been spending his off-seasons in South Carolina for some time.) The five main teams in the bidding war to land Messier were the New York Rangers, New York Islanders, Philadelphia, Chicago and Detroit. Detroit dropped out of the race when Sather insisted Steve Yzerman had to be part of any deal for Messier, and Philadelphia dropped out because they did not want to trade Mike Ricci. Finally, one day after the season began, Messier was dealt to the New York Rangers in exchange for Bernie Nicholls, Steven Rice, Louie DeBrusk, future considerations and US$5 million. (Part of Messier's desire to move to a new team was his desire to make more money than Edmonton could offer. Foreshadowing the financial issues Edmonton would face for the rest of the decade, Messier went from being paid CAD$1.1 million a season in Edmonton to an average of US$2.6 million a season in New York.) Because of the cash the Oilers received in the Messier trade, the view of people in Edmonton was that it was Pocklington again selling off the team's best players to pocket cash for himself. A month into the season, defenceman Jeff Beukeboom was also dealt to the Rangers (to complete the future considerations of the Messier deal) for defenceman David Shaw. Shaw was traded to Minnesota later that season for Brian Glynn.

Kevin Lowe was selected to succeed Messier as captain. Simpson eventually agreed to a one-year contract to stay in Edmonton. Tikkanen was at an impasse, as Sather refused to budge on his salary demands, until Peter Pocklington actually got Tikkanen's home number in Finland from a CFRN sports reporter, personally called Tikkanen and negotiated a new $1 million per season contract. Bill Ranford played the entire season while renegotiating his contract, and by season's end, he too had a new contract worth $1 million per season. Despite the staggering amount of turnover, the Oilers actually produced a comparable season to 1990–91, finishing third in the Smythe Division with 36 wins and 82 points. The Oilers were led by a new first line of Damphousse, Nicholls, and Murphy: Damphousse led the team with 38 goals and 89 points. Norm Maciver led the team in plus-minus with a +20, also chipping in 40 points despite only playing 57 games. The Oilers' offence was balanced, with eight players scoring at least 20 goals. The most surprising 20 goal scorer was fourth-line checker Kelly Buchberger.

In the first round of the playoffs, the Oilers again met the Los Angeles Kings. The Kings now boasted five team members who had played on the Oilers' championship team of 1987 (Wayne Gretzky, Jari Kurri, Paul Coffey, Marty McSorley and Charlie Huddy) in an attempt to re-create the Oilers' success. Stressing disciplined play, the Oilers split the first four games with the Kings before Tikkanen's hat trick in Game Five put the Oilers ahead 3–2. Game 6 in Edmonton was a 3–0 shutout win for the Oilers, as the high-powered Kings were sent packing. Since the Gretzky trade, the Oilers had now met the Kings four times in the playoffs: the Oilers had won three of the four series, with a head-to-head record of 15–8. Next up was the division champion Vancouver Canucks; the Oilers split the first two games at the Pacific Coliseum, then returned to Edmonton and won both games on home ice. Game 5 was a Vancouver victory, but the Oilers returned home and won Game 6, again by a 3–0 score. The upstart Oilers were back in the Campbell Conference Finals for the third straight season, facing the Chicago Blackhawks. However, their unexpected run in the playoffs came to a crashing halt, as the Blackhawks dominated every game and swept the series 4–0. Stressing defence, Chicago stymied the Edmonton powerplay, which went 0-for-19. These playoffs were viewed as a coming-out party for Joe Murphy, as he led the team with 24 points in 16 playoff games.

=== 1993–1996 ===
By this time, the animosity toward the Oilers in the city of Edmonton was no longer deniable. Due to lingering bitterness over the Gretzky trade, attendance had been on the decline for several years, from an average of 17,503 (arena capacity) in 1988–89 to 16,179 by 1991–92. By 1991–92, sellouts were rare, even in the playoffs when the Oilers made the Conference Finals. The Messier trade further exasperated the fan base, and by the summer of 1992, the season-ticket base had dwindled to under 9,000, and for the first time, talk surfaced that the Oilers might leave town.

Also, by this time, the financial discrepancies facing the Oilers versus the richer NHL clubs began to manifest themselves. Although Edmonton's fan base is loyal, Edmonton has always been one of the smallest markets in the league. In addition, for many years Edmonton lacked a strong business community capable of supporting the Oilers that other NHL cities possessed. (Part of the reason for this is that due to being the provincial capital, there was never a need to develop a business community in Edmonton the same way a city like Calgary developed. It was not until many years later that Edmonton began to make its corporate and financial community a priority.) The fact that the Oilers and other Canadian teams paid salaries in Canadian dollars, whereas American teams paid in more valuable US dollars, was also a disadvantage, particularly as free agency came into the NHL. In addition, Pocklington's business empire sank under the weight of recession, scandal, and corruption.

Many of the players from the dynasty years continued to play at an elite level well into the 1990s, leading to speculation about how many more Cups the Oilers would have won had Pocklington been able or willing to keep the team together. In 1992–93, the Kings, with six former Oilers on the roster (Wayne Gretzky, Jari Kurri, Marty McSorley, Charlie Huddy, Jimmy Carson and Pat Conacher) made a surprise run to the Stanley Cup Final. A year later, the Rangers won the Cup with seven former Oilers on the roster—Messier (the first player to captain two different Stanley Cup-winning teams), Lowe (the all-time leader in games played for the Oilers), Anderson, Graves, MacTavish, Esa Tikkanen and Jeff Beukeboom. Of that group, Messier, Lowe, Anderson and MacTavish had been with the Oilers for all five of their Cup runs. The Rangers' Stanley Cup win was the last hurrah for the great Edmonton team of the 1980s. Paul Coffey won a Stanley Cup with the Pittsburgh Penguins in 1991 and played an instrumental role in helping the Detroit Red Wings and Philadelphia Flyers make the Cup Finals, in 1995 and 1997, respectively. Five of those players—Gretzky (1), Messier (12), Coffey (29), Kurri (50) and Fuhr (70) would make the list of the 100 greatest players in the history of the NHL, published in 1998 by The Hockey News and (along with Anderson) were all inducted in the Hockey Hall of Fame.

The departures of the stars from the 1980s exposed serious deficiencies in the Oilers' development system. While Sather was very adept at getting the final pieces to his championship teams through trades and free agency, he was less successful at building for the team's future. The Oilers had done a poor job of drafting during the dynasty years, though it had gone unnoticed since their stellar records resulted in them drafting late in the entry draft. Beukeboom, in 1983, was the only first-round pick of the dynasty era who became a success in Edmonton. Even without this to consider, the younger players had not had nearly enough time to develop before the core of the 1980s dynasty left town. The en masse departure of the dynasty-era stars left the Oilers so bereft of talent that Sather was forced to rush young prospects to Edmonton sooner than planned.

However, this did not become apparent for a few years; as mentioned above, the Oilers still had enough heft to make the conference finals two years in a row after winning their last Cup. However, it was obvious they were nowhere near being the powerhouse that had dominated the NHL in the previous half-decade.

The Oilers' luck finally ran out in 1992–93. They struggled all season long. By the trade deadline, they were in very real danger of missing the playoffs altogether. On March 26, the Oilers were routed 4–1 by Gretzky's Kings, assuring they would miss the playoffs for the first time as an NHL team. It was also only the third time they had missed the playoffs in their 21-year history. They would not return to the post-season for four straight years, despite the emergence of young centremen Doug Weight and Jason Arnott. In the 1993–94 season, with the changing of the conference and division names, the Oilers were now situated in the Western Conference's Pacific Division.

Trouble followed the team off the ice as well. For most of the 1990s, the Oilers were desperately trying to stay alive. Pocklington was unwilling to use the proceeds from his other business interests to bankroll the team. In 1998, the team was nearly sold to Houston interests who sought to move the team. Just hours before the deadline for the Houston group to close, the Edmonton Investors Group, a consortium of 37 Edmonton-based owners, raised the funds to purchase the team from Pocklington, vowing to keep the Oilers in Edmonton. The Oilers received support in this endeavour from the NHL, which had already seen two Canadian teams (the Nordiques and Jets) move to the United States earlier in the decade.

== Return to the playoffs (1996–2004) ==
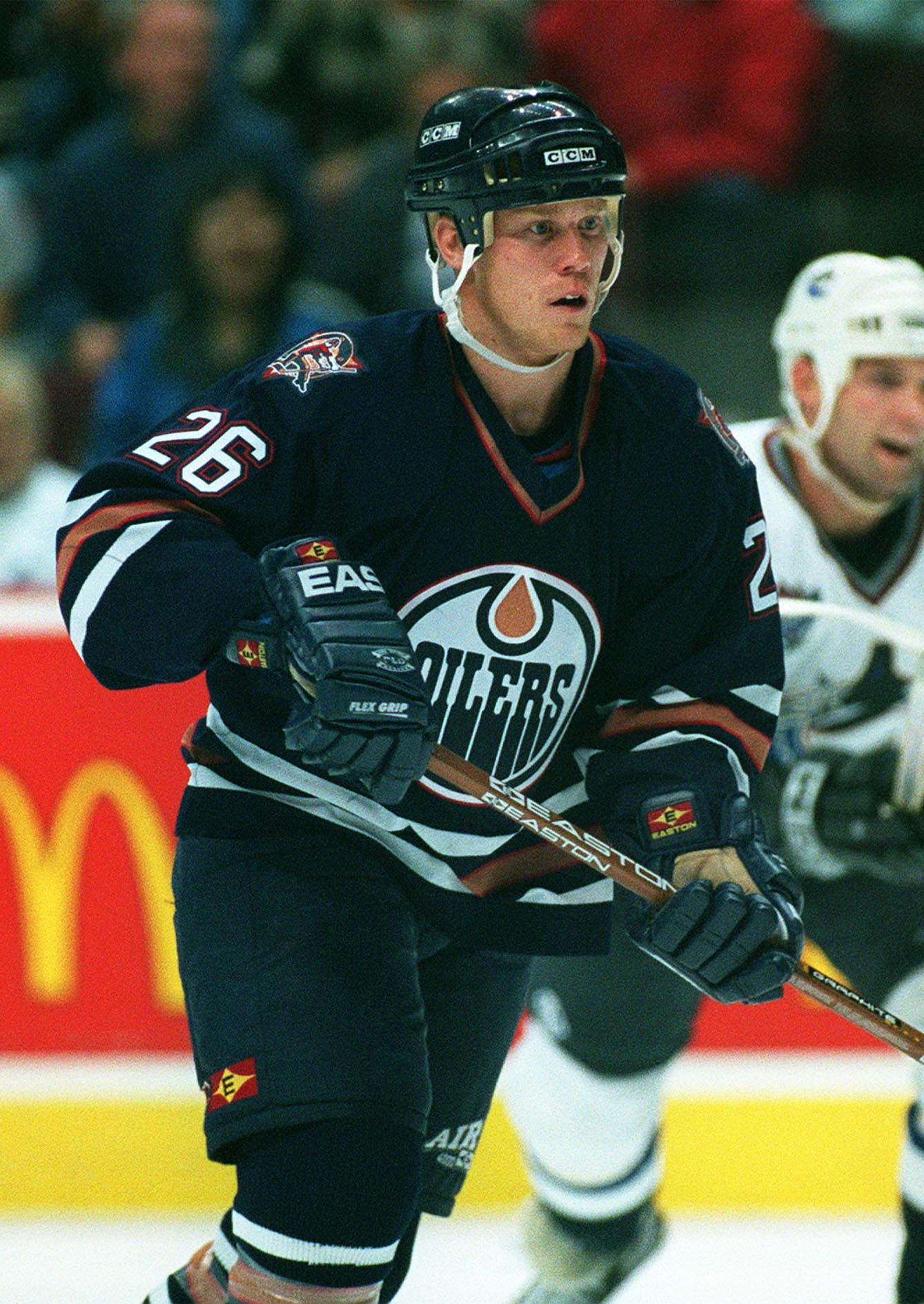
Todd Marchant in 1997. Marchant helped the Oilers advance in the first round of the 1997 Stanley Cup playoffs, scoring the deciding goal for the series.

In 1996–97 NHL season, the Oilers made the playoffs for the first time in five years, and in the first round, they upset the Dallas Stars, which had compiled the NHL's second-best record, in an exciting seven-game series. Riding on the hot goaltending of Curtis Joseph, the Oilers completed the upset on a breakaway by Todd Marchant in overtime. Another highlight of that playoff series was on April 20. Down 3–0 with just under four minutes to play in Game 3, the Oilers rallied for three goals in the final three minutes of the third period to tie the game and eventually win 4–3 in overtime on Kelly Buchberger's game-winning goal. Though Edmonton would lose to the defending Stanley Cup champion Colorado Avalanche in the next round, fans were ecstatic about the Oilers' return to the playoffs.

In 1998, Joseph led the Oilers to another first-round upset. After spotting the Pacific Division champion Avalanche a 3–1 lead, the Oilers held the powerful Avalanche scoreless for eight straight periods en route to winning the series in seven games. Dallas and Edmonton met again in the second round, but this time the Stars were victors. This was the start of one of the most unusual rivalries in hockey: between 1997 and 2003, the Oilers and Stars played each other in the playoffs six times, five of them first-round matchups. The only year in which they did not meet was 2002, when neither team made the playoffs. This streak was not formally ended until 2006, when the second-seeded Stars (in the Western Conference) were eliminated in the first round by the Avalanche, while, for the first time in 16 years, the eighth-seeded Oilers went to the Stanley Cup Final.

On November 22, 2003, the Oilers hosted the Heritage Classic, the first regular season outdoor hockey game in NHL history and part of the celebrations of the Oilers' 25th season in the NHL. The Oilers were defeated by the Montreal Canadiens 4–3 in front of more than 55,000 fans, an NHL attendance record, at Commonwealth Stadium, Edmonton. A few days earlier, on November 17, 2003, the Edmonton Oilers desperately needed a centre and signed veteran Adam Oates to a contract. However, the 2003–04 NHL season was a disappointment as the Oilers failed to make the playoffs, despite also acquiring centre Petr Nedved from the New York Rangers at the trade deadline as the team went on a late-season surge, staying in the playoff hunt until the end of the season, narrowly eliminated from the playoffs.

On July 23, 2004, the team announced its American Hockey League (AHL) affiliate, the Toronto Roadrunners, would play the 2004–05 AHL season at the Oilers' home arena of Rexall Place. The decision, an unusual one for a North American professional sports organization, was likely influenced by the expectation that the 2004–05 NHL lockout would wipe out the 2004–05 NHL season. After an unsuccessful year, the Edmonton Road Runners were suspended with the intention of moving them to Saskatoon. However, this would have required the Western Hockey League (WHL)'s Saskatoon Blades to move to Edmonton, and an agreement could not be reached. The team remained dormant until 2010–11, when it was resurrected as the Oklahoma City Barons.

The Oilers struggled with their small-market status for years as big-market teams scooped up high-priced help, but after the wiped-out 2004–05 season, the Oilers looked poised to compete again. 2004–05 NHL lockout negotiations led to a collective agreement between the NHL owners and players that included an NHL-wide salary cap, forcing all teams to essentially conform to a budget, as many small-market teams had been doing for years. Sold-out buildings and a more reasonable conversion rate of Canadian dollar revenues to United States dollar payroll in the new millennium have also helped the Oilers to return to profitability.

Although Edmonton was one of the last teams to make a big splash in the free-agent market, they were able to acquire the rights to and sign former Hart and Norris Trophy winner Chris Pronger from the St. Louis Blues to a five-year, $31.25 million contract, as well as trade for New York Islanders forward Michael Peca, two-time winner of the Frank J. Selke Trophy for best defensive forward. Although the club had to give up Mike York and Eric Brewer to the Islanders and Blues respectively, fans now hoped the team could at least return to the playoffs, if not to the glory the franchise enjoyed during its mid to late 1980s dynasty era.

However, the team suffered again from inconsistency during the first few months of the regular season, especially in goal and on offence. Goaltender Ty Conklin was injured during training camp, and when he returned, was unreliable in net. Nominal backup Jussi Markkanen showed flashes of brilliance, but still was not quite ready for regular NHL goaltending duty. Edmonton even tried third-string goalie Mike Morrison, called up from the ECHL, but after a strong start, he too faded. A streaky goal-scoring production led by left-wingers Ryan Smyth and Raffi Torres had trouble putting pucks in the net at times, but Torres did produce back to back two goal games on his 24th birthday, October 8, 2005, against the Vancouver Canucks and on October 10, 2005, against the Mighty Ducks of Anaheim. Pronger also struggled early on with the rule changes restricting the amount of obstruction and front-of-the-net abuse — Pronger's previous specialty — that could be performed without a penalty, while Peca simply had trouble adapting to the Oilers' system and expectations, desperately underachieving. Many called for head coach Craig MacTavish to be fired; others wanted a big trade, some miracle. Nothing major materialized, but by the end of December, the Oilers led the Northwest Division with a 22–18–4 record for 48 points.

However, the Oilers remained inconsistent. By the end of January, the Oilers traded for scoring defencemen Jaroslav Spacek from the Chicago Blackhawks and Dick Tarnstrom from the Pittsburgh Penguins, and both defencemen, Spacek in particular, secured their shaky blue line. However, their goaltending was still in doubt, and the Oilers struggled after the Winter Olympic break. But right before Trading Deadline 2006, the Oilers added 2004 All-Star goaltender Dwayne Roloson from the Minnesota Wild, and speedy forward Sergei Samsonov, a former rookie of the year, from the Boston Bruins. The Oilers gave up a pair of picks for Roloson, and checking centre Marty Reasoner and prospect Yan Šťastný (previously acquired from the Bruins) along with a 2006 second round draft pick for Samsonov. Reasoner returned to Edmonton after the 2006 playoffs ended.

The new acquisitions paid off, and Edmonton finished the regular season with 95 points, clinching the eighth and final playoff spot in the Western Conference over Vancouver. Oiler youngsters Ales Hemsky, Shawn Horcoff and Jarret Stoll led the way in scoring, with breakout seasons of 77, 73 and 68 points respectively. Smyth finished with 36 goals and 66 points, the second-best seasons of his career in both respects. Smyth led the team in goal-scoring, with Raffi Torres next on the list at 27.

=== 2006 Stanley Cup run ===
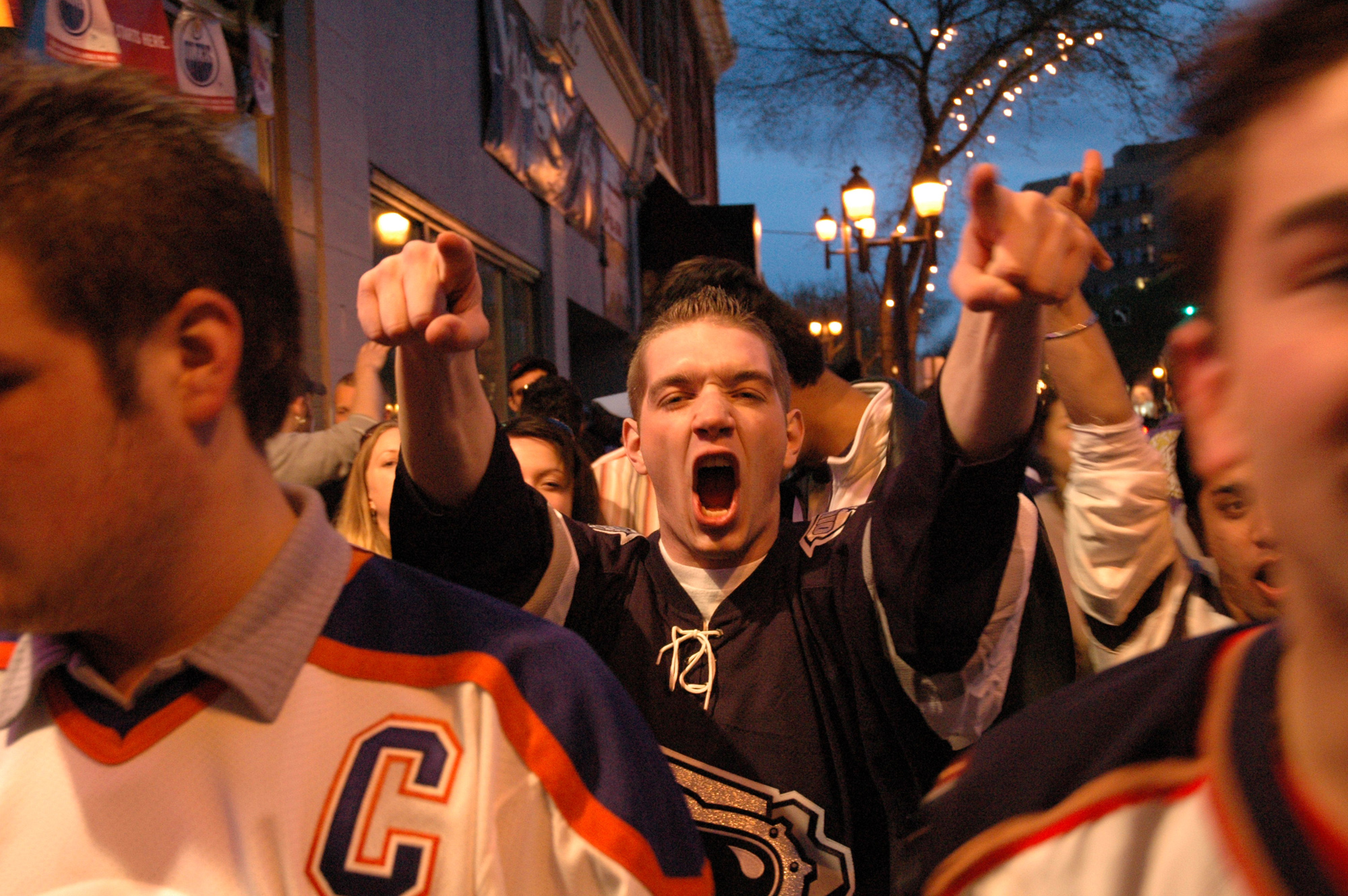
Oilers fans celebrate on Whyte Avenue during the 2006 Stanley Cup playoffs.

In the first round of the playoffs, the Oilers played the Presidents' Trophy-winning Detroit Red Wings. Though not having high expectations due to being the eighth seed, the Oilers embarked on a great Cinderella run, pulling off a six-game upset, neutralizing Wings' offensive weapons Brendan Shanahan, Henrik Zetterberg and Pavel Datsyuk by using the neutral zone trap. It was the team's first playoff series win since 1998. Edmonton would meet the San Jose Sharks in the Conference Semi-final and were not favoured to win again. The Sharks' regular season scoring leader Joe Thornton (also acquired from the Bruins to go to San Jose) and goal champ Jonathan Cheechoo had just defeated the Nashville Predators in five games in their previous series. After trailing the series two-games-to-none, the Oilers won the next four, vaulting them into Conference Final. In Game 6, goaltender Dwayne Roloson had a 2–0 shutout — his first ever — and Michael Peca scored the game- and series-winning goal. In so doing, the Oilers became the first eighth-seeded team to reach a Conference Final since the NHL changed the playoff format in 1994. There, the Oilers defeated the sixth-seeded Mighty Ducks of Anaheim in five games, claiming the Clarence S. Campbell Bowl for a franchise-record seventh time.

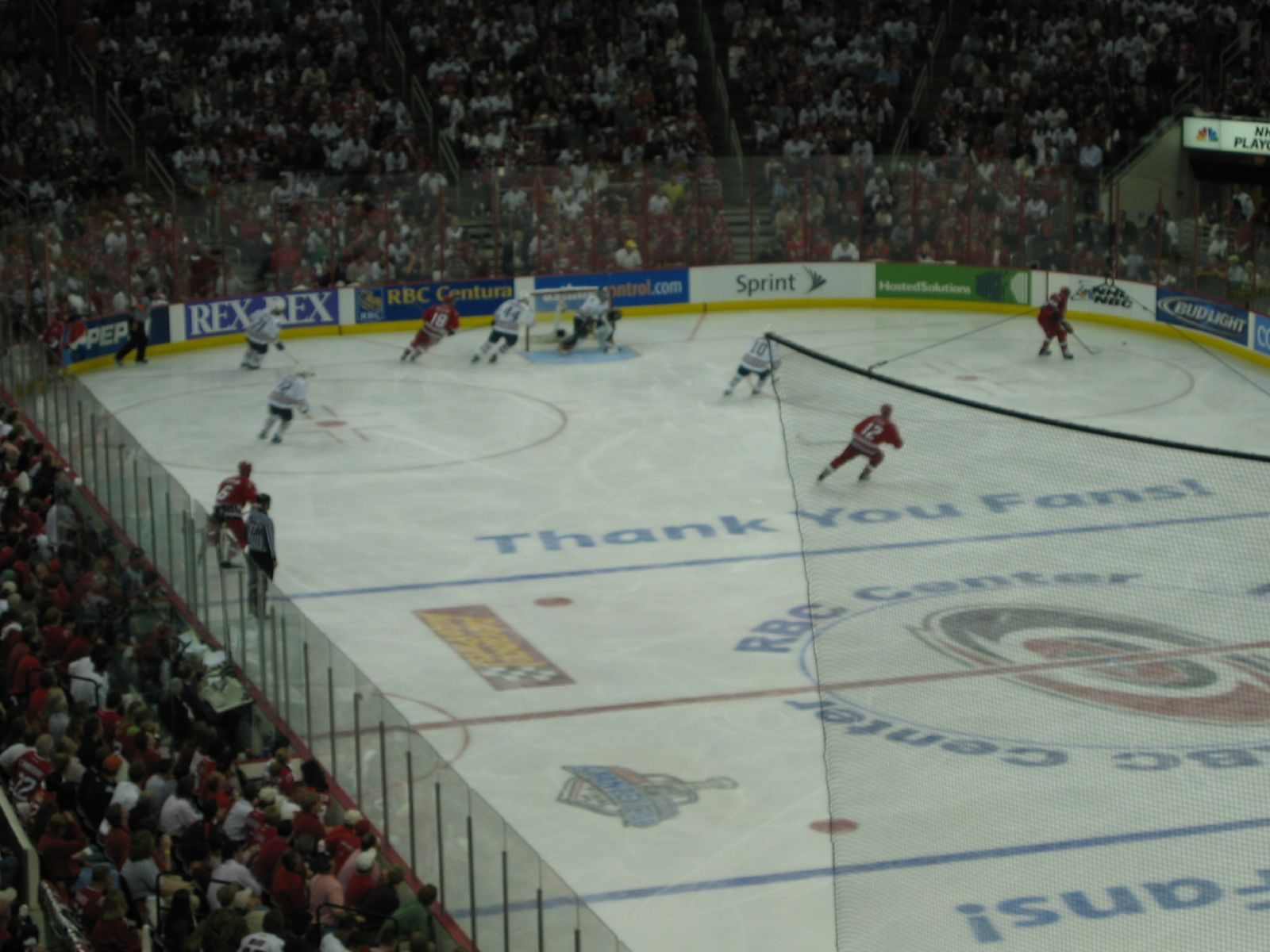
The Oilers faced the Carolina Hurricanes in the 2006 Stanley Cup Final.

Edmonton continued their Cinderella run against the Carolina Hurricanes in the Stanley Cup Final (marking the first time two former WHA franchises met in Stanley Cup play—the Hurricanes were previously the Hartford Whalers). In the third period of Game 1, with the score tied at four, Oilers defenceman Marc-Andre Bergeron knocked 'Canes winger Andrew Ladd into Oilers starting goaltender Dwayne Roloson, causing an injury to Roloson's MCL, knocking him out of the series. With Roloson out, Rod Brind'Amour scored the game winner on a mix-up by Ty Conklin and Jason Smith with only 30 seconds left. After trailing the series 2–0 and 3–1, the Oilers forced a Game 7 while riding backup Jussi Markkanen, an overtime shorthanded goal in Game 5 by local hero Fernando Pisani, and a 4–0 shutout win at home in Game 6. However, they could not complete the comeback, as the Hurricanes won Game 7 3–1 to capture their first ever Stanley Cup championship. The Oilers, on the other hand, would later hang their 23rd banner in their young history by winning the Western Conference title.

== Collapse and playoff drought (2006–2015) ==
Four days after their loss to the Hurricanes, Chris Pronger surprised Oiler fans and management when he issued a trade request on June 23, citing unspecified personal reasons. On July 3, 2006, Pronger was traded to the Anaheim Ducks in exchange for Joffrey Lupul, defensive prospect Ladislav Šmid, Anaheim's first-round draft pick in 2007, Anaheim's second in 2008 and a conditional first round pick. In addition, many of the Oilers' 2005–06 acquisitions signed for contracts elsewhere: Jaroslav Spacek joined the Buffalo Sabres on July 5, Sergei Samsonov signed with the Montreal Canadiens on July 12, and Michael Peca with his hometown Toronto Maple Leafs on July 18. In addition, enforcer and fan favourite Georges Laraque, despite offering the Oilers a substantial pay cut in exchange for a no-trade clause, wound up signing with the Phoenix Coyotes, and goaltender Ty Conklin, seeking to rebuild his reputation, signed a two-way contract with the Columbus Blue Jackets the following day. The Oilers also lost 2002–03 New York Rangers acquisition Radek Dvorak to unrestricted free agency as the St. Louis Blues signed him on September 14.

Despite these losses, many of the Oilers' core players were re-signed. Playoff heroes and locally born Fernando Pisani and Dwayne Roloson, aged 37, signed as unrestricted free agents (UFAs) on the first day of eligibility, July 1. Jarret Stoll, Shawn Horcoff and Ales Hemsky filed for arbitration as restricted free agents, but all settled for multi-year deals before their hearings came up; Hemsky, in particular, signed a six-year, $24.6 million contract. The Oilers also brought back centre Marty Reasoner, whom they had traded for Samsonov in March, prospect Tom Gilbert from the University of Wisconsin–Madison, defenceman Daniel Tjarnqvist from the Minnesota Wild and defenceman Jan Hejda from Khimik Moscow Oblast of the Russian Superleague (RSL), whose rights were acquired from the Sabres for a seventh-round pick. On August 11, Rangers unrestricted free agent Petr Sykora and the Oilers agreed on a one-year contract. Just over a month later, on September 12, Joffrey Lupul and the Oilers agreed to a three-year, $6.935 million contract.

During the 2006–07 Edmonton Oilers season, the team posted a 32–43–7 record, their lowest point total since the 1995–96 season, finishing in 11th place in the Western Conference and missing the playoffs. Throughout the season, the Oilers lost various players to injury and illness. At one point, they had 11 players out of the line-up and had to rely on emergency call-ups to fill their roster.

In May 2007, Daryl Katz offered $145 million towards the purchase of the team. Sources close to the Edmonton Journal stated that, as part of the deal, the team would remain in Edmonton. No negotiations took place, as the board of directors immediately responded the Oilers were not for sale. In July 2007, Katz tried again, this time increasing the offer to an amount over $170 million. Katz bypassed the board of directors and brought the offer directly to the shareholders. As of January 31, 2008, Katz has upped the offer to $200 million plus $100 million towards a new arena.

Other highlights include:

- June 27, 2006: The Oilers' long-planned push to also own an expansion major-junior franchise in the WHL was granted. The Edmonton Oil Kings would begin play, in the 2007–08 WHL season.
- October 12, 2006: Ryan Smyth records the fastest Oilers hat trick in franchise history at 2:01 minutes, breaking Wayne Gretzky's record of 2:12 minutes.
- January 2, 2007: The Oilers win their 1,000th NHL game. They are the third-fastest team to reach 1,000 wins, after the Montreal Canadiens and the Philadelphia Flyers.
- February 27, 2007: The Oilers traded Ryan Smyth to the New York Islanders for Ryan O'Marra, Robert Nilsson and a first-round pick in the 2007 NHL entry draft. The trade was announced just after the official deadline passed, which was sparked after failed contract negotiations to keep Smyth with the Oilers. Kevin Lowe and the Oilers management characterized the trade as an opportunity to build for the future. The trade was on the same day of Mark Messier's jersey retirement by the Oilers. To avoid disrupting the emotional ceremony with possible harassment from fans, Lowe was not seen on the ice with other Oiler alumni in attendance. However, the trade of Smyth seemed to take more out of the Oilers than many expected. After the Smyth trade, the Oilers won only 2 of their remaining 19 games, which included 11 consecutive losses.

=== 2007–2010 ===
In the 2007–08 Edmonton Oilers season, the team started out of the gate very slowly, going 5–10 in their first 15 games. They would finish the first half of the season 16–21–4. However, they would turn it around after New Year's. With the emergence of young players like Sam Gagner, Andrew Cogliano, Robert Nilsson, Tom Gilbert and Denis Grebeshkov, the Oilers would finish the second half of the season a remarkable 25–14–2 in 41 games. This despite missing big free agent signing Sheldon Souray, Shawn Horcoff, Raffi Torres and captain Ethan Moreau for the rest of the season. The Oilers finished 41–35–6, in ninth place in the Western Conference and only three points back of a playoff spot. Expectations were high for the 2008–09 season.

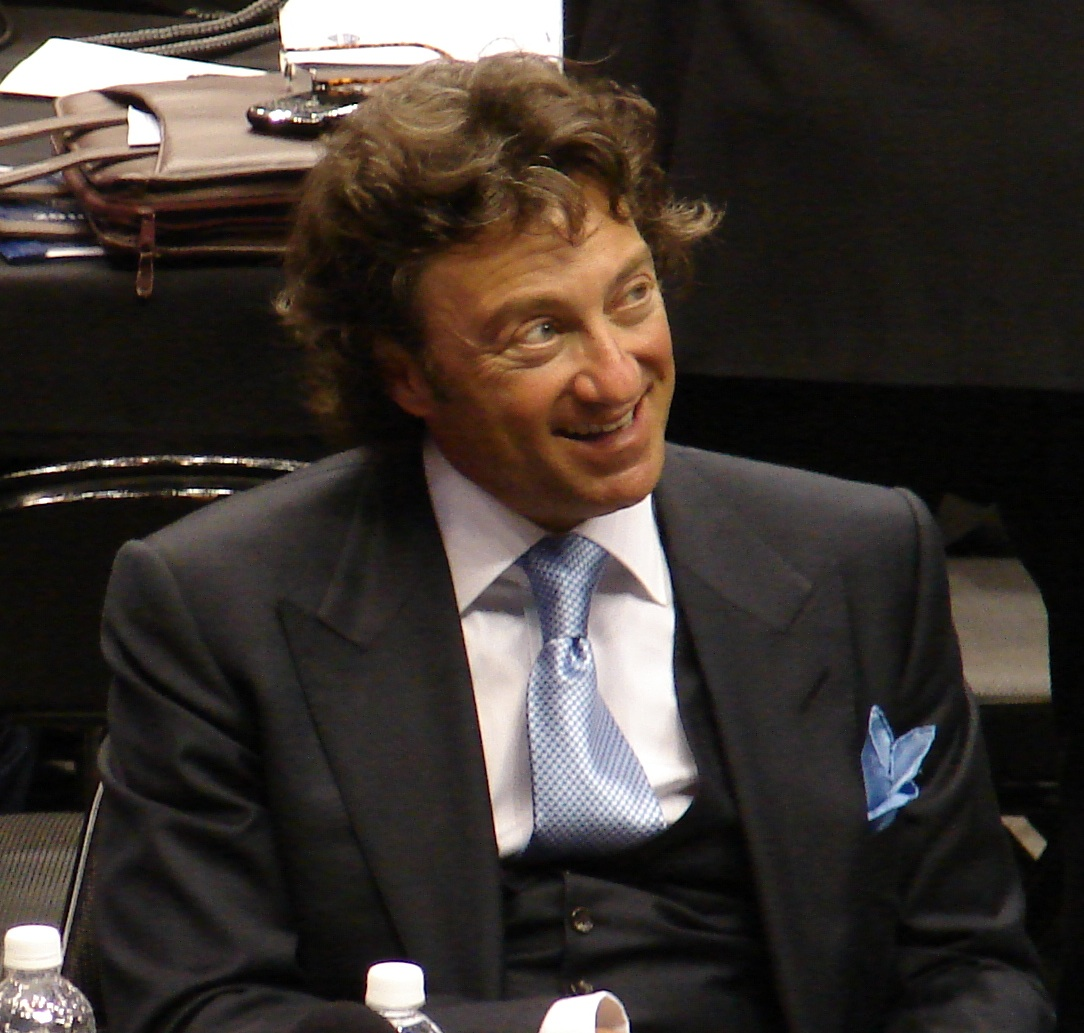
Daryl Katz at the 2010 NHL entry draft. Katz purchased the Oilers from the Edmonton Investors Group in February 2008.

On February 5, 2008, during the 2008–09 season, Daryl Katz obtained letters of intent to sell from all of the previous owners; after several unsuccessful attempts at purchasing the Edmonton Oilers from the Edmonton Investors Group. The Katz Group also owned the naming rights to the rink the Edmonton Oilers played in, named "Rexall Place" after Katz's pharmaceutical chain, from 2004 to 2016.

In the off-season, Kevin Lowe traded centreman Jarret Stoll and defenceman Matt Greene for the experienced Lubomir Visnovsky of the Los Angeles Kings. He also traded promising young defenceman Joni Pitkanen for the veteran power forward Erik Cole of the Carolina Hurricanes. Lowe also made offers in the off-season to sign star forwards Marian Hossa and Jaromir Jagr, although neither deal materialized. These moves were uncharacteristic for the Oilers over the last decade, but with new ownership and a new NHL, the Oilers have shown that they can compete in the free agent market for high priced talent.

In the following season, Oilers goaltender Dwayne Roloson set an NHL record for being the oldest goaltender to play 60 games in a season. However, the Oilers failed to qualify for the 2009 playoffs. The Oilers kicked off the 2009 off-season by firing long-time head coach Craig MacTavish and assistants Billy Moores and Charlie Huddy. The Oilers replaced MacTavish by hiring Pat Quinn to be head coach, Tom Renney as the associate coach and Wayne Fleming as the assistant coach, while Kelly Buchberger was retained as assistant coach.

Edmonton drafted the highly touted Magnus Paajarvi-Svensson as the tenth overall pick at the 2009 NHL entry draft. The Oilers then traded fan-favourite Kyle Brodziak to the Minnesota Wild for another two draft picks in the 2009 Draft, which were used to draft Kyle Bigos and Olivier Roy.

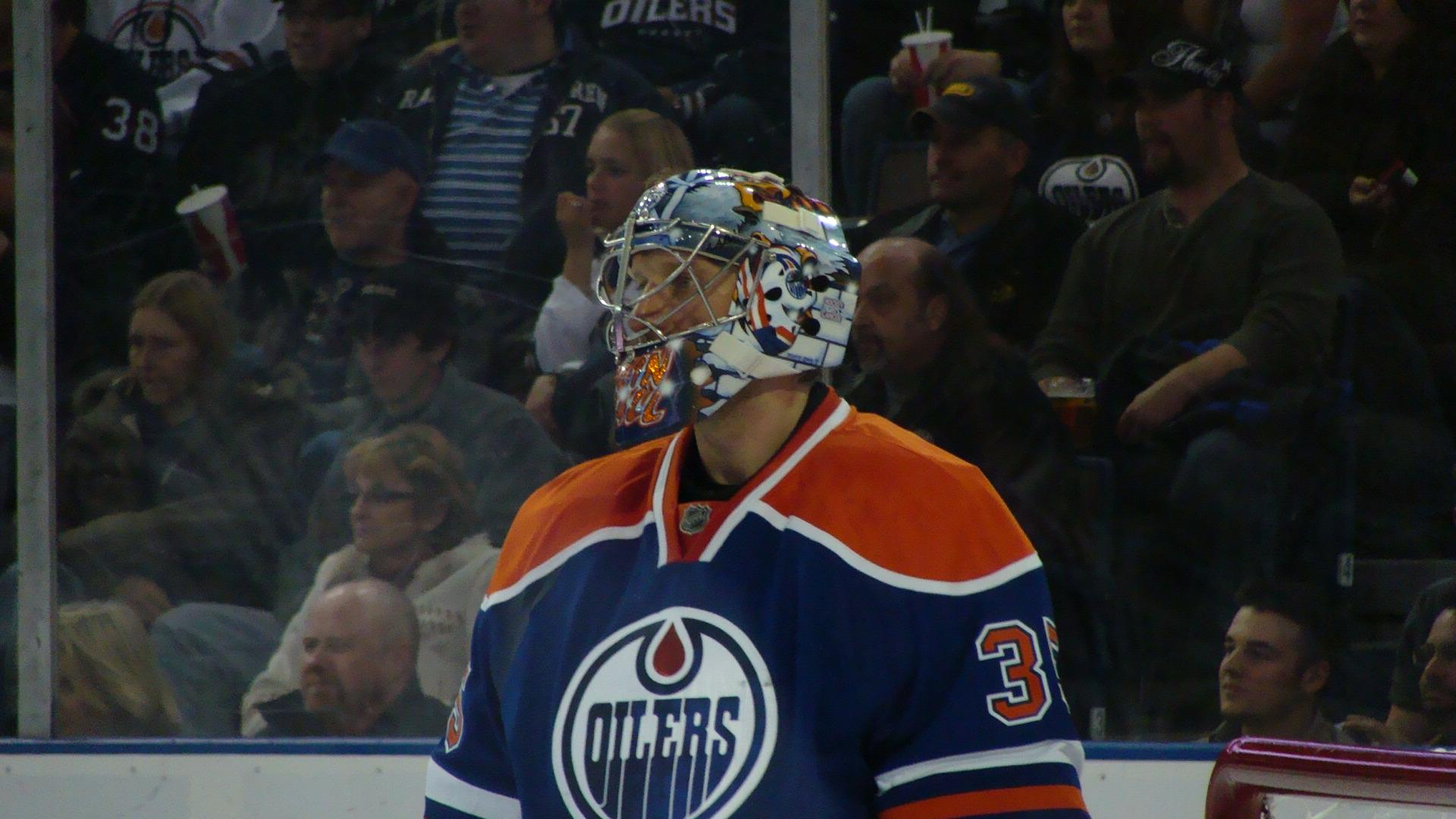
Nikolai Khabibulin was signed by the Oilers during the 2009 off-season.

The Oilers headed into the free agency with two key free agents in Dwayne Roloson and Ales Kotalik. Edmonton let both Roloson and Kotalik walk, and they subsequently signed replacements, in the form of veteran goaltender Nikolai Khabibulin and a former Oiler, centre Mike Comrie. Khabibulin signed a four-year, $15 million contract, while Comrie signed a one-year, $1.125 million contract. While the Oilers made these transactions, their whole off-season was marred by the failure of a huge blockbuster trade that was agreed upon with the Ottawa Senators, in which the Oilers would acquire two-time 50 goal scorer Dany Heatley, in exchange for forwards Andrew Cogliano, Dustin Penner and defenceman Ladislav Šmid. However, Heatley would refuse to be dealt to Edmonton (per the stipulation of the no-trade clause in his contract), and would be later traded to the San Jose Sharks.

The 2009–10 season did not bring welcoming thoughts to Oilers fans, as Edmonton ended the season with one of the worst records in franchise history: finishing dead last at 30th place, with a total of 62 points. The Oilers' campaign was blighted by long-term injuries to key players, notably starting goaltender, Nikolai Khabibulin and winger Ales Hemsky (amongst others). The Oilers recorded a total of 530 in current man games lost, a new (albeit un-wanted) franchise record high. Dustin Penner emerged as the leading point scorer (63), recording career highs in all offensive categories. Penner was one of three Oilers that played in all 82 games of the 2009–10 season.

On February 9, 2010, during the 2009–10 season, the Oilers announced the AHL Board of Governors had approved of the relocation of the Oilers' inactive AHL franchise to Oklahoma City, to begin play in the 2010–11 AHL season. After a lengthy fan competition to decide on the team name, they were finally named the Oklahoma City Barons on May 20, 2010.

== McDavid–Draisaitl era (2015–present) ==
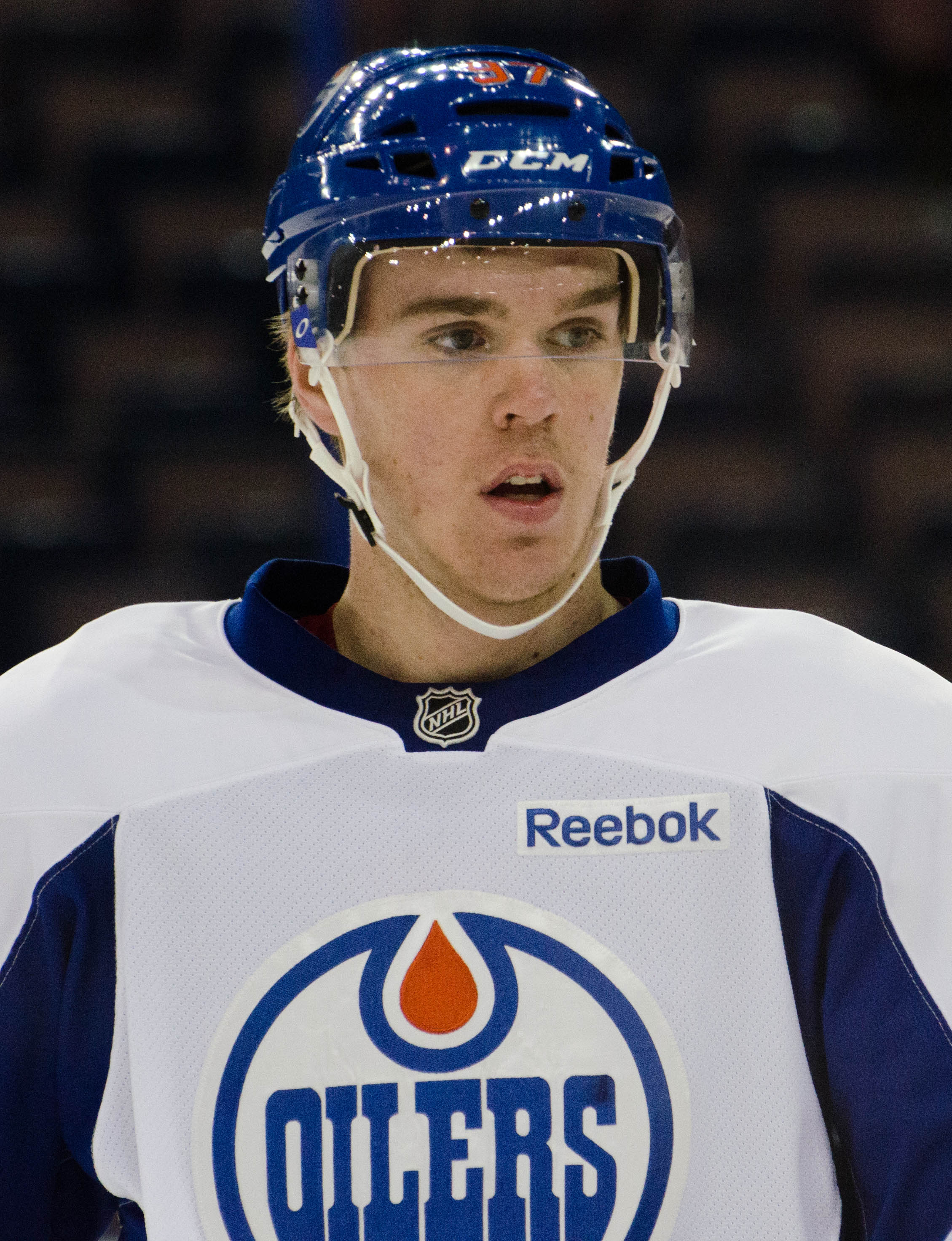
The Oilers drafted Connor McDavid first overall in the 2015 draft. He was named the Oilers' 15th team captain in 2016 and the youngest in NHL history.

The Oilers won the 2015 Draft Lottery on April 18, moving them from the third-overall pick to first, marking their fourth lottery win in six seasons. The Oilers selected Connor McDavid first overall in the 2015 NHL entry draft held in Sunrise, Florida, on June 26.

On April 24, Craig MacTavish was removed from his position as general manager and was replaced by former Boston Bruins general manager Peter Chiarelli, who was also appointed president of hockey operations as part of other related changes. In Chiarelli's first transactions as Oilers general manager, he traded a first and a second-round pick during the first day of the 2015 NHL entry draft to the New York Islanders, in exchange for defenceman Griffin Reinhart. Chiarelli again made trades the following day and traded another second-, a third- and a seventh-round draft pick to the New York Rangers, to acquire goaltender Cam Talbot and the Rangers' seventh-round draft pick. On May 19, Todd McLellan was named the new head coach of the Oilers. He and his former team, the San Jose Sharks, mutually agreed to part ways on April 20 after the Sharks failed to qualify for the 2015 playoffs. More coaching changes came on June 4 when Keith Acton and Craig Ramsay were relieved of their duties.

In addition to these coaching changes, the Oilers also made some changes to their scouting staff on June 22, which saw both head amateur and professional scouts Stu MacGregor and Morey Gare relieved of their duties. Amateur scouts Brad Davis and Kent Hawley, and professional scouts Dave Semenko and Billy Moores, who served as director of coaching and special projects, were also relieved of their duties. Further changes came on October 7, when the Oilers elected to begin the 2015–16 season without a team captain; this marked the first time they had done so since entering the NHL, in 1979. Taylor Hall, Jordan Eberle, Ryan Nugent-Hopkins, and Andrew Ference, who had served as team captain the previous two seasons, were all named as alternate captains.

On February 27, 2016, mathematically eliminated from playoff contention, the Oilers traded defenceman Justin Schultz to the Pittsburgh Penguins, in exchange for a third-round pick in the 2016 NHL entry draft. Before his trade, Schultz endured the worst season of his professional career, with just 10 points in 45 games.

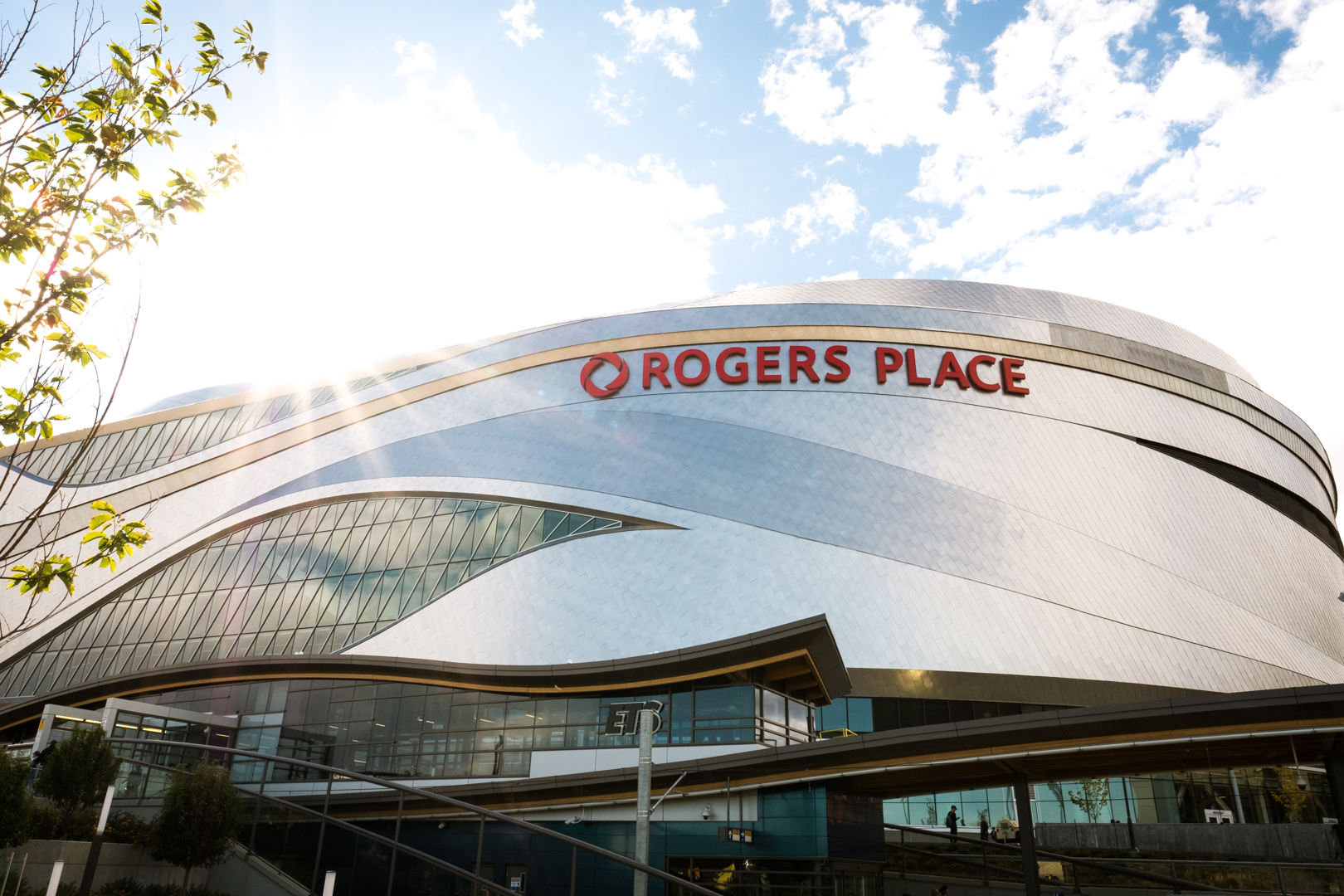
Photo of the exterior of the Roger's Place arena

After the 2015–16 season, the Oilers prepared to move from Rexall Place, their home since 1974, to newly built Rogers Place. On April 6, in their final home game at Rexall, the Oilers defeated the Vancouver Canucks 6–2. Before the game, the Oilers held a ceremony honouring the history of the arena. Oilers' alumni, including Mark Messier and Wayne Gretzky, skated around the rink one more time.

In a one-for-one trade on June 29, Edmonton dealt all-star winger Taylor Hall to the New Jersey Devils, in exchange for defenceman Adam Larsson. Following the Hall trade, Chiarelli also pursued impending free agent Milan Lucic signing him to a seven-year contract, in a bid to make the playoffs for the first time since 2006. Chiarelli and Lucic were already familiar with each other, during their time together with the Boston Bruins. On October 5, 19-year-old Connor McDavid was named the 15th captain of the Oilers; McDavid was the youngest team captain in NHL history, having broken the record previously held by Colorado Avalanche captain Gabriel Landeskog. The Oilers made further moves to their roster a few days later, when they traded Nail Yakupov to the St. Louis Blues, and signed free-agent defenceman Kris Russell.

The 2016–17 season was a great success for the team. After defeating the Los Angeles Kings 2–1 on March 28, 2017, the Oilers qualified for the 2017 Stanley Cup playoffs, ending their 11-year drought. The Oilers finished with a 47–26–9 record, thanks largely to a 100-point season from McDavid and breakout performances from fellow forwards Leon Draisaitl and Patrick Maroon, whilst backstopped with strong play from netminder Cam Talbot. McDavid led the entire league with 70 assists and 100 points, earning himself both the Art Ross Trophy and Hart Memorial Trophy, as his team's most valuable player. Talbot also set a new franchise record, with a total of 42 games won by a goaltender, surpassing the 40 games won by Grant Fuhr, during the 1987–88 season.

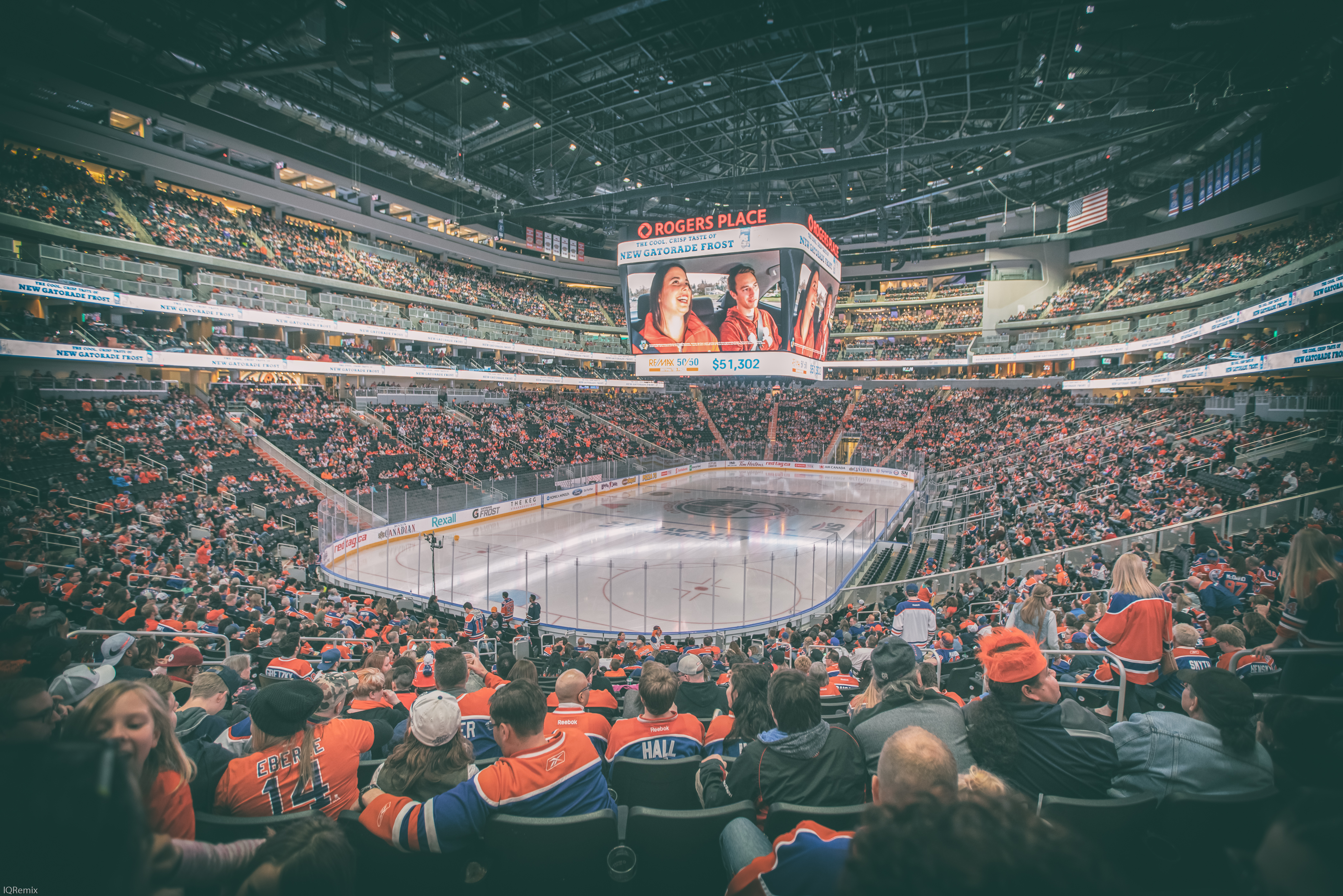
Rogers Place during the 2017 Stanley Cup playoffs. The Oilers moved into Rogers Place before the start of the 2016–17 season.

In the first round of the playoffs, the Oilers eliminated the San Jose Sharks, following a 3–1 win in Game 6, to secure their first playoff series win since 2006. Their playoff run was stopped on May 10, losing to the Anaheim Ducks in Game 7 with a 2–1 loss, ending the second-round series.

In the 2017 off-season, the Oilers traded Jordan Eberle to the New York Islanders, in exchange for forward Ryan Strome, to gain salary relief. The Oilers signed both McDavid and Draisaitl to 8-year contracts worth $100 million and $68 million, carrying annual cap hits of $12.5 million and $8.5 million, respectively. The Oilers had high expectations coming into the 2017–18 season, as many expected to make progress off of their surprising year in 2016–17. However, the Oilers regressed, posting a 36–40–6 record and missing the playoffs for the 11th time in 12 seasons.

On January 22, 2019, the Oilers terminated Chiarelli's employment as president and general manager. Keith Gretzky was appointed interim general manager the following day. The Oilers again missed the playoffs, posting a 35–38–9 record and having only qualified for the playoffs once in 13 seasons.

On May 7, the Oilers announced the appointment of Ken Holland as general manager. Three weeks later, the Oilers named Dave Tippett as the team's new head coach, on May 28. In the 2019–20 season, the Oilers showed some hope; the team had a record of 37–25–9 on March 12, 2020, when the COVID-19 pandemic suspended the season. Edmonton was chosen as one of the two host cities of the 2020 Stanley Cup playoffs and qualified for the playoffs as the fifth seed in the Western Conference; however, the team was upset by the Chicago Blackhawks in four games in the preliminary round.

In the 2020–21 season, the Oilers finished second in the North Division with a 35–19–2 record, largely due to a 105-point season from Connor McDavid, only the ninth player to reach the mark in 53 games. Additionally, Leon Draisaitl had an excellent season, as the runner-up in NHL league scoring, with 84 points. McDavid's 105-point season earned him a unanimous second Hart Trophy win as the most valuable player in the NHL, becoming the second unanimous winner in league history (along with Wayne Gretzky in 1981–82). The Oilers faced the third place team in the North Division the Winnipeg Jets in the First Round of the playoffs. The Oilers were swept in four games by the Jets, and three of the Oilers' losses came in overtime, including the final game, which went to triple overtime. Darnell Nurse logged 62 minutes and 7 seconds of ice time in the final game, third-most in NHL history.

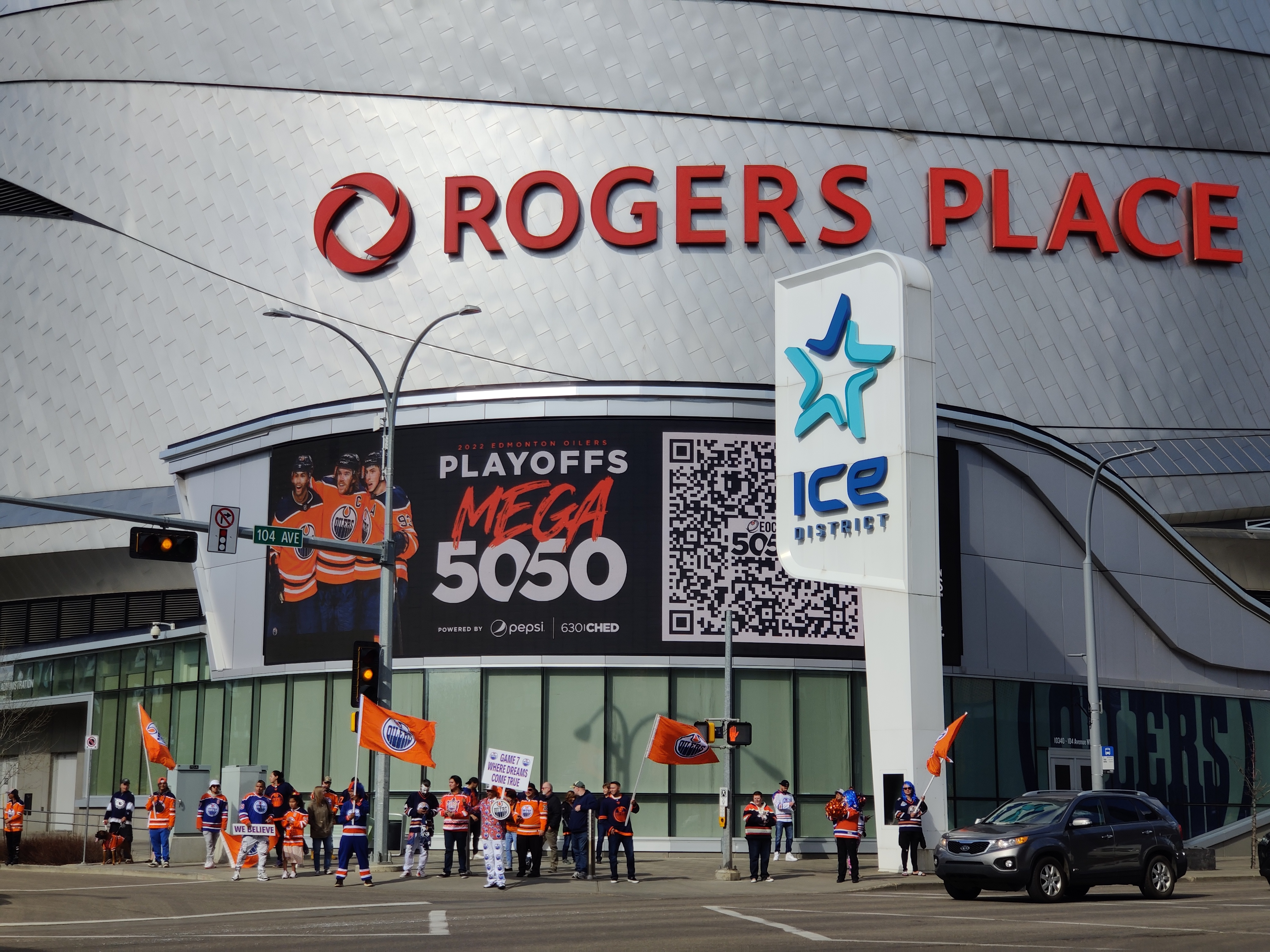
Fans outside Rogers Place during the first round of the 2022 Stanley Cup playoffs.

In the 2021–22 season, the Oilers finished with 49–27–6, their first 40-win season since 2017. McDavid had a career-high 123 points and the Oilers clinched second place in the Pacific Division. The Oilers faced the Los Angeles Kings in the First Round of the 2022 Stanley Cup playoffs. After struggling at first, the Oilers managed to cling on and win an extremely close series with a shutout in Game 7 to advance to the Second Round. There, they faced their provincial rival Calgary Flames for the first since 1991. The series was a tight battle, leading to the Oilers triumphing over the Flames in five games. The series was a part of the iconic Battle of Alberta which is known for its excessive amount of high-scoring games and brutality. The Oilers advanced to the Western Conference Finals for the first time since 2006 where they were swept in four games by the eventual Stanley Cup champion Colorado Avalanche.

In the 2022–23 season, the Oilers had three players Connor McDavid, Leon Draisaitl, and Ryan Nugent-Hopkins each reach the 100-point milestone. This milestone from the trio marks the first NHL season since 1995–96 where one team had three players score 100 points. The Oilers finished 50–23–9 with their first 50-win season since the 1986–87 season, recording 109 points and clinched the second seed in the Pacific Division, earning an opening round playoff matchup with the Los Angeles Kings for the second consecutive year. Connor McDavid had a career-high scoring 153 points, recording the highest single season point total in the salary cap era. After defeating the Kings in six games, they were eliminated in the Second Round by the eventual Stanley Cup champion Vegas Golden Knights, also in six games.

In the 2023–24 season, the Oilers started with a disappointing 3–9–1 record which led to the dismissals of head coach Jay Woodcroft and assistant coach Dave Manson. But by the end of the season, the Oilers finished with a 49–27–6 record, being 46–18–5 under new head coach Kris Knoblauch and clinched the second seed in the Pacific Division, earning an opening round playoff matchup with the Los Angeles Kings for the third consecutive year. During the season, the Oilers went on a 16-game win streak which began on December 21, 2023, against the New Jersey Devils and ended on February 6, 2024, against the Vegas Golden Knights. Zach Hyman scored a personal high 54 goals to finish as the team leader in goals scored and Connor McDavid became the fourth player since 1990–91 to record 100 assists in a single NHL season, joining former Oilers captain Wayne Gretzky and Hockey Hall of Famers, Mario Lemieux and Bobby Orr.

=== Stanley Cup runs: 2024-2026 ===
In the third consecutive first round matchup against the Kings, the Oilers won the series, this time in five games. The Oilers then faced the Pacific Division champions, the Vancouver Canucks, in the second round. Vancouver won all four of their games against Edmonton in the regular season; three of those four games were played before Woodcroft and Manson's dismissals. The Oilers defeated them in seven games while being able to prevent an attempted three-goal comeback from the latter in the third period of Game 7, with the Canucks falling one goal short of forcing overtime. After eliminating the Canucks to be the last Canadian team standing in the 2024 Stanley Cup playoffs, the Oilers were up against the Central Division champions, the Dallas Stars, in the Western Conference finals. The Oilers would eventually win that series in six games and advance to their first Stanley Cup Final since 2006.

In the Stanley Cup Final, the Oilers were matched up against the Eastern Conference champion, the Florida Panthers, with the latter having home-ice advantage in the series. The Oilers lost the first three games, but would emerge victorious in each of the next three games to force a Game 7 in Florida. In Game 4 of the series, Connor McDavid broke the record for most assists in a single postseason, a feat previously held by Wayne Gretzky; the next game, McDavid would set a record for most points in back-to-back games, with his second consecutive four-point game. In Game 7, the Oilers were unable to become the fifth team in the NHL to overcome a 0–3 deficit in a playoff series and the second team in the league's history to accomplish such feat in a Stanley Cup final, as they would fall short 1–2 at the end of regulation. Despite losing the game, the Oilers outscored the Panthers 23–18 in the series and McDavid would win the Conn Smythe Trophy as most valuable player of the playoffs, becoming the sixth player to win the trophy in a finals losing team since Jean-Sebastian Giguere in 2003 and second skater to do so after Reggie Leach in 1976. McDavid would finish the postseason with 42 points, making him the third player in NHL history to record 40 points or more in a single postseason after Wayne Gretzky (who accomplished such feat three times, twice with the Oilers) and Mario Lemieux.

In 2025 the Edmonton Oilers would once again find their way to the Stanley Cup finals. After defeating the Los Angeles Kings (4 games - 2), then the Vegas Golden Knights (4 games -1), winning the Western Conference final against the Dallas Stars (4 games - 1) they ended up losing in six games to the Florida Panthers.

In 2026 the Oilers were widely seen to be Canada's strongest team in contention for the Stanley Cup however, they lost in the first round to the Anaheim Ducks, and then head coach, Kris Knoblauch, and assistant coach, Mark Stuart, were let go.
