= Doug Messier Award =

US ice hockey award

The Doug Messier Award is given each year to the "Most Outstanding Player" in the American Hockey League (AHL) and the ECHL. The award is voted on by the members of the Professional Hockey Players' Association (PHPA), and was first awarded after the 2025-26 season. The award is named after Doug Messier, a founding member of the PHPA, and recipients are said to "exemplify excellence, professionalism, and the kind of character that earns the respect of their peers."

== Winners ==
=== AHL ===
Season	Player	Team
2025–26	Michael DiPietro	Providence Bruins

=== ECHL ===
Season	Player	Team
2025–26	Marcus Crawford	Kansas City Mavericks
