= Michael DiPietro =

Canadian ice hockey player (born 1999)

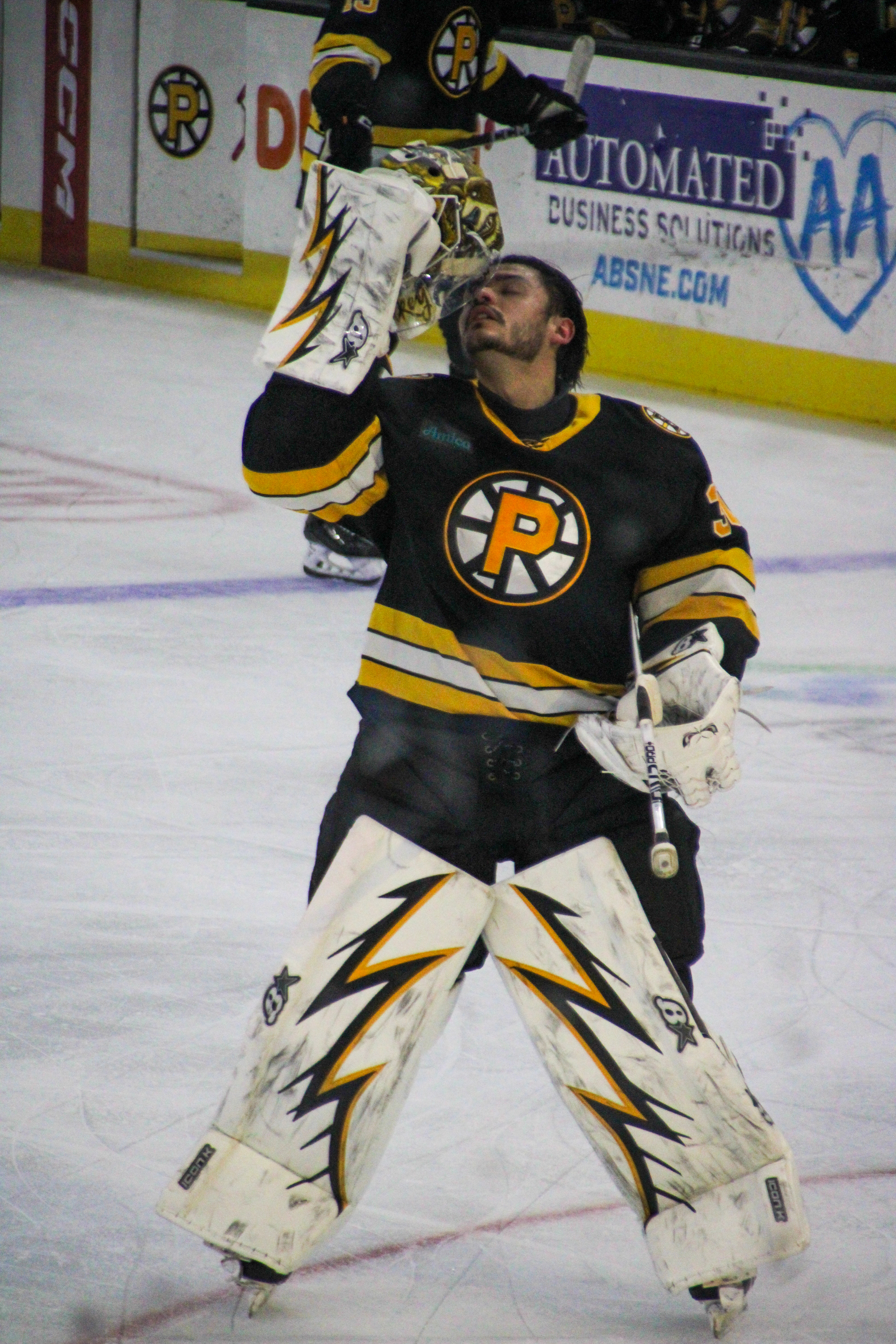
- DiPietro with the Providence Bruins in 2024
- Born: June 9, 1999 (age 27) Windsor, Ontario, Canada
- Height: 6 ft 0 in (183 cm)
- Weight: 205 lb (93 kg; 14 st 9 lb)
- Position: Goaltender
- Catches: Left
- NHL team Former teams: Boston Bruins; Vancouver Canucks
- NHL draft: 64th overall, 2017; Vancouver Canucks
- Playing career: 2019–present

Michael DiPietro (born June 9, 1999) is a Canadian professional ice hockey player who is a goaltender for the Boston Bruins of the National Hockey League (NHL). He was selected in the third round, 64th overall, by the Vancouver Canucks in the 2017 NHL entry draft.

== Playing career ==
DiPietro began playing hockey as a defenceman until he was nine years old when he switched to goaltender after watching his step-brother play the position.

Before being drafted into the OHL, DiPietro played with the Sun County Panthers Minor Midget AAA team. During the 2014–15 season, DiPietro played in 21 games and posted a .862 save percentage.

DiPietro was drafted in the second round, 23rd overall, by the Windsor Spitfires in the 2015 OHL Draft. During his rookie season, DiPietro had a 16–8–1 record while posting a save percentage of .912. He was awarded the F. W. "Dinty" Moore Trophy after his rookie year for being the rookie goaltender with the best goals-against average, becoming the first Spitfires player to ever win the award. He was also named to the OHL First All-Rookie Team.

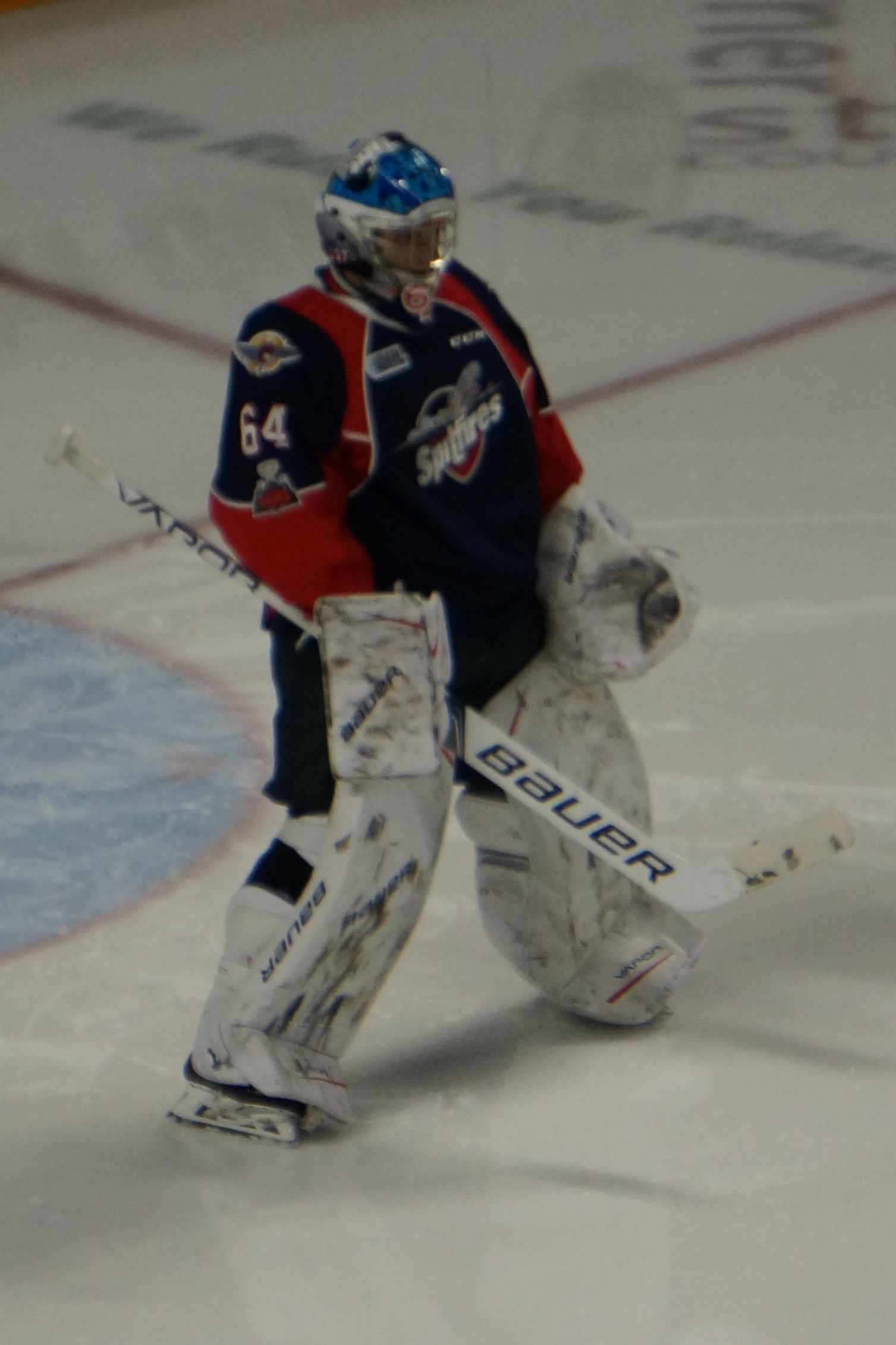
DiPietro with the Windsor Spitfires in 2017

In his sophomore year, DiPietro helped guide the Spitfires to a Memorial Cup victory, posting a .932 save percentage during Windsor's championship win. For his efforts, DiPietro was awarded the Hap Emms Memorial Trophy, named to the Memorial Cup All-Star Team and the OHL Third All-Star Team.

After two successful seasons, scouts started to take notice. Bill Sloan, Head Scout South of the Mason Dixon, was quick to note his potential. As such, before his junior season, DiPietro was drafted 64th overall by the Vancouver Canucks in the 2017 NHL entry draft. Unsigned by the Canucks, DiPietro rejoined the Spitfires for the 2017–18 season. In his junior season, DiPietro posted a 29–21–3–1 record with seven shutouts and a .910 save percentage. For his efforts, DiPietro was named OHL Goaltender of the Year and to the OHL First All-Star Team.

On May 31, 2018, the Canucks signed DiPietro to a three-year entry-level contract. DiPietro began the 2018–19 season in the OHL after attending Canucks training camp. On October 28, after a 4–1 win over the Owen Sound Attack, DiPietro set a Spitfires franchise record for most wins in Spitfires history with his 79th. DiPietro started the 2018–19 season with the Spitfires, posting a .920 save percentage in 21 starts. On December 4, he was traded to the Ottawa 67's in exchange for Egor Afanaseyev and drafts picks ranging from 2019 to 2023.

On February 5, 2019, DiPietro was called up to the NHL on an emergency basis after starter Thatcher Demko was injured. He made his NHL debut on February 11 in a 7–2 loss to the San Jose Sharks, stopping 17 of 24 shots. By making his debut, DiPietro became the second youngest Canucks goaltender in franchise history, only being surpassed by Troy Gamble. He was returned to the Ottawa 67's the following night.

On March 18, 2019, DiPietro and teammate Cedrick Andree were announced as the co-winners of the Dave Pinkney Trophy for allowing the fewest goals against in the league. In 17 games with the Ottawa 67's, DiPietro had a 12–4–0–0 record with a 2.50 goals-against-average. In the playoffs, DiPietro had a 13–0 record with the 67's before suffering an injury in the OHL finals, and did not return as the Guelph Storm won the OHL championship.

On January 21, 2022, DiPietro would be called up to the NHL on an emergency basis after starter Thatcher Demko was placed into the NHL's COVID-19 protocol. On January 23, he would return to the NHL by starting against the St. Louis Blues in a 3–1 loss after goaltender Spencer Martin was also placed on the COVID-19 protocol, stopping 14 of 17 shots. On January 27, DiPietro would then be assigned to the Taxi Squad, and would eventually be sent down along with Sheldon Dries to the Abbotsford Canucks a day later on January 28.

Unable to find traction within the Canucks organization and having earlier submitted a trade request, DiPietro entered his fourth professional season in 2022–23 assigned to the Abbotsford Canucks. Before making his season debut, DiPietro was traded by the Canucks to the Boston Bruins, along with prospect Jonathan Myrenberg, in exchange for Jack Studnicka on October 27, 2022.

During the 2024–25 season with the Providence Bruins, DiPietro had a 26–8–5 record in 40 appearances, finishing second in the league in both victories and save percentage (.927) and third in goals-against average (2.05). In recognition of his play, he received the Aldege "Baz" Bastien Memorial Award as AHL goaltender of the year, the Les Cunningham Award for the AHL MVP, and was named to the AHL First All-Star Team. After the season, DiPietro was named the inaugural winner of the Doug Messier Award, the PHPA award for most outstanding AHL player, voted on by the association's members.

DiPietro was called up to the Boston Bruins roster for the 2026-27 season to serve as the backup goalie for Jeremy Swayman. He got his first career NHL win on October 16, 2026, in a Bruins 4-2 victory over the Anaheim Ducks. DiPietro then picked up his first NHL shutout on October 22, in a 6-0 victory over the Nashville Predators.

== International play ==
Medal record

Representing Canada

Ice hockey

World Championships
Gold medal – first place	2021 Latvia	

DiPietro played in the 2015 World U-17 Hockey Challenge, taking 4th place with Canada Red, and also played in the 2016 Ivan Hlinka Memorial Tournament. After being a late cut from Team Canada's 2018 IIHF World Junior Championship roster, DiPietro eventually made his World Juniors debut during the 2019 IIHF World Junior Championships. In the first game of the tournament on December 26, 2018, DiPietro recorded a shut-out in a 14–0 win over Denmark. In Canada's final game of the preliminary round, DiPietro was named Canada's best player of the game in a 2–1 loss to Russia. He ended the preliminary round with a .957 save percentage. On January 2, Canada was eliminated from the World Juniors tournament in a heartbreaking 2–1 overtime loss in the quarterfinals to Team Finland.

DiPietro was named to Team Canada for the 2021 IIHF World Championship, with whom he had won a gold medal, and the 2022 Spengler Cup.

== Personal life ==
While they share a last name, DiPietro is not related to former Montreal Canadiens forward Paul DiPietro, or former New York Islanders goalie Rick DiPietro. DiPietro models his game after Los Angeles Kings goalie Jonathan Quick. He has a tattoo celebrating winning the Memorial Cup.

== Career statistics ==
=== Regular season and playoffs ===
			Regular season									Playoffs
Season	Team	League	GP	W	L	OTL	MIN	GA	SO	GAA	SV%	GP	W	L	MIN	GA	SO	GAA	SV%
2014–15	Sun County Panthers	AHMMPL	21	6	11	3	893	75	4	3.95	.862	9	4	4	404	17	1	1.89	.933
2014–15	Leamington Flyers	GOJHL	1	1	0	0	60	2	0	2.00	.905	—	—	—	—	—	—	—	—
2015–16	Windsor Spitfires	OHL	29	16	8	2	1,644	67	2	2.45	.912	3	1	2	190	11	0	3.48	.869
2016–17	Windsor Spitfires	OHL	51	30	12	6	2,935	115	6	2.35	.917	7	3	4	436	18	0	2.48	.917
2017–18	Windsor Spitfires	OHL	56	29	21	4	3,267	152	7	2.79	.910	6	2	4	342	16	0	2.81	.934
2018–19	Windsor Spitfires	OHL	21	11	8	1	1,241	48	1	2.32	.920	—	—	—	—	—	—	—	—
2018–19	Ottawa 67's	OHL	17	12	4	0	933	39	3	2.51	.897	14	13	0	844	33	1	2.35	.914
2018–19	Vancouver Canucks	NHL	1	0	1	0	60	7	0	7.00	.708	—	—	—	—	—	—	—	—
2019–20	Utica Comets	AHL	36	21	11	2	2045	95	1	2.79	.908	—	—	—	—	—	—	—	—
2019–20	Vancouver Canucks	NHL	1	0	0	0	8	1	0	7.16	.857	—	—	—	—	—	—	—	—
2020–21	Utica Comets	AHL	4	3	1	0	238	10	0	2.52	.916	—	—	—	—	—	—	—	—
2021–22	Abbotsford Canucks	AHL	34	15	14	4	1912	94	0	2.95	.901	—	—	—	—	—	—	—	—
2021–22	Vancouver Canucks	NHL	1	0	1	0	57	3	0	3.14	.824	—	—	—	—	—	—	—	—
2022–23	Maine Mariners	ECHL	29	19	9	0	1,635	71	1	2.61	.918	2	0	2	102	6	0	3.55	.902
2022–23	Providence Bruins	AHL	1	1	0	0	60	2	0	2.00	.943	—	—	—	—	—	—	—	—
2023–24	Providence Bruins	AHL	30	18	9	2	1617	70	4	2.51	.918	—	—	—	—	—	—	—	—
2024–25	Providence Bruins	AHL	40	26	8	5	2373	81	4	2.05	.927	7	3	3	357	11	1	1.85	.928
2025–26	Providence Bruins	AHL	45	34	8	1	2644	84	3	1.91	.930	4	1	3	244	8	0	1.96	.931
2025–26	Boston Bruins	NHL	1	0	0	0	6	0	0	0.00	1.000	—	—	—	—	—	—	—	—
NHL totals			4	0	2	0	132	11	0	5.01	.780	—	—	—	—	—	—	—	—

=== International ===
Year	Team	Event	Results	GP	W	L	T	MIN	GA	SO	GAA	SV%
2015	Canada Red	U17	4th	5	3	2	0	317	9	0	1.70	.929
2016	Canada	IH18	5th	3	2	1	0	179	6	0	2.00	.923
2019	Canada	WJC	6th	4	2	1	1	243	5	1	1.23	.951
Junior totals				12	7	4	1	739	20	1	1.62	.940

== Awards and honours ==
Award	Year	Ref
OHL
F. W. "Dinty" Moore Trophy	2015–16	
OHL First All-Rookie Team	2015–16	
OHL Third All-Star Team	2016–17	
OHL Goaltender of the Year	2017–18	
OHL First All-Star Team	2017–18	
Dave Pinkney Trophy	2018–19	
CHL
Hap Emms Memorial Trophy	2017	
Memorial Cup All-Star Team	2017	
Memorial Cup champion	2017	
AHL
First All-Star Team	2024–25, 2025–26	
Aldege "Baz" Bastien Memorial Award	2024–25, 2025–26	
AHL All-Star	2025, 2026	
Les Cunningham Award	2025-26	
Doug Messier Award	2025-26	

Awards and achievements
Preceded by Michael McNiven	F. W. "Dinty" Moore Trophy; 2015–16	Succeeded by Matt Villalta
Preceded by Tyler Parsons	Hap Emms Memorial Trophy; 2017	Succeeded by Kaden Fulcher
Preceded by Michael McNiven	OHL Goaltender of the Year; 2017–18	Succeeded by Ukko-Pekka Luukkonen
