= Doug Messier =

Canadian ice hockey player

- Born: September 5, 1936 (age 89) Wainwright, Alberta, Canada
- Height: 6 ft 0 in (183 cm)
- Weight: 185 lb (84 kg; 13 st 3 lb)
- Position: Defence
- Shot: Left
- Played for: Seattle Totems; Edmonton Flyers; Portland Buckaroos; Pittsburgh Hornets
- Playing career: 1954–1969

Douglas Herbert Messier (born September 5, 1936) is a Canadian former ice hockey player and coach. He played 487 games in the Western Hockey League, playing with the Seattle Totems, Edmonton Flyers, and Portland Buckaroos. He also played briefly in the American Hockey League for the Pittsburgh Hornets. Messier is the father of Paul Messier and Hockey Hall of Fame player Mark Messier.

After his playing career, Messier became a minor league hockey coach. He also was a founding member of the Professional Hockey Players' Association, and served as the associations first Executive Director from 1967 to 1969. In 2026, the PHPA announced an award in Messier's honor, the Doug Messier Award, which is awarded yearly to the most outstanding players in each the American Hockey League and ECHL, as voted on by PHPA members.
