= Kingston Frontenacs =

Ontario Hockey League team in Kingston

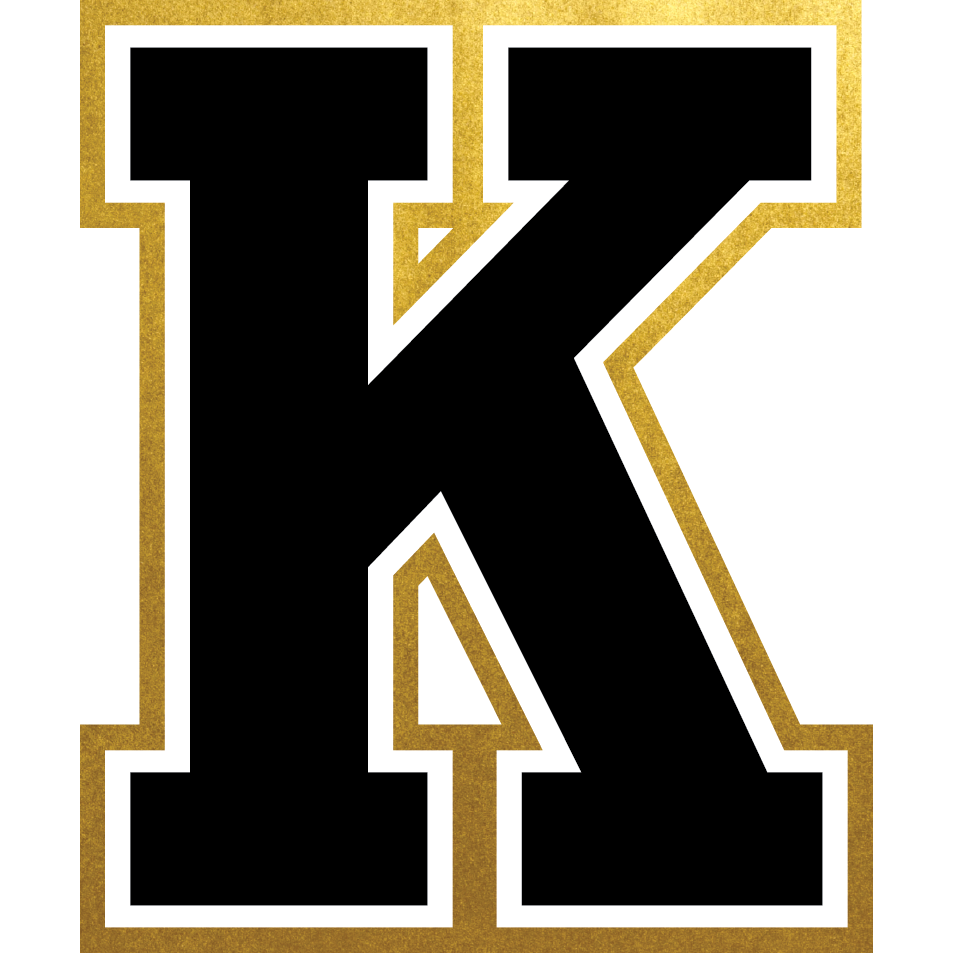
- City: Kingston, Ontario
- League: Ontario Hockey League
- Conference: Eastern
- Division: East
- Founded: 1989–90
- Home arena: Slush Puppie Place
- Colours: Black, gold and white
- General manager: Kory Cooper
- Head coach: Troy Mann
- Affiliates: Cobourg Cougars
- Website: www.kingstonfrontenacs.com

Franchise history
- 1945–1952: Kingston Victorias
- 1952–1973: Kingston Frontenacs
- 1973–1988: Kingston Canadians
- 1988–1989: Kingston Raiders
- 1989–present: Kingston Frontenacs

Current uniform

The Kingston Frontenacs are a Canadian major junior ice hockey team in the Ontario Hockey League, based in Kingston, Ontario. The Frontenacs play home games at Slush Puppie Place, which opened in 2008. The team's history predates the Ontario Hockey League, to a team known as the Kingston Victorias in 1945. This current Frontenacs franchise was founded in the Ontario Hockey Association in 1973–74, then known as the Kingston Canadians until 1987–88. The team was briefly known as the Kingston Raiders in 1988–89, and as the Frontenacs since.

== History ==
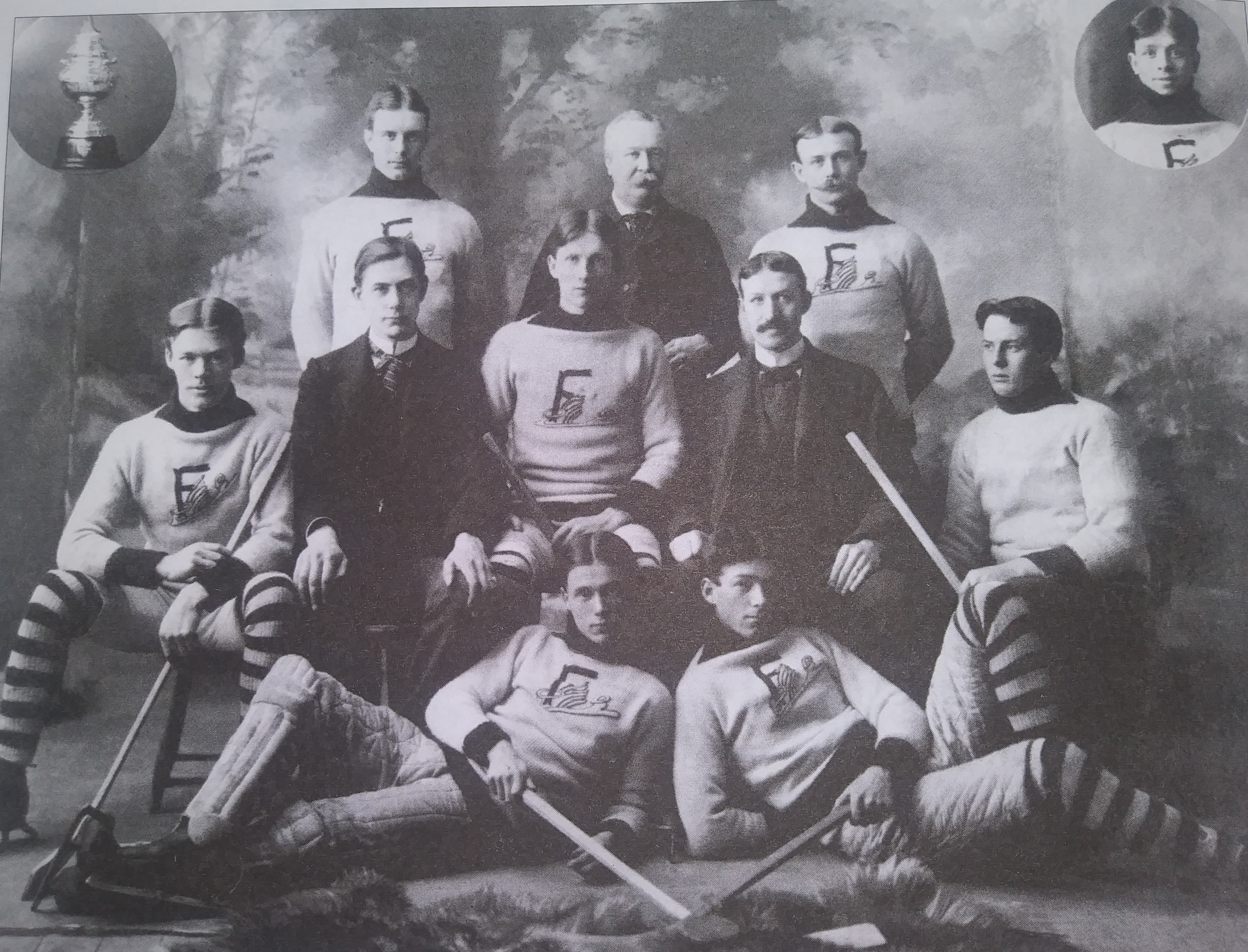
1898-99 Kingston Frontenacs intermediates and the J. Ross Robertson Cup (inset, upper left)

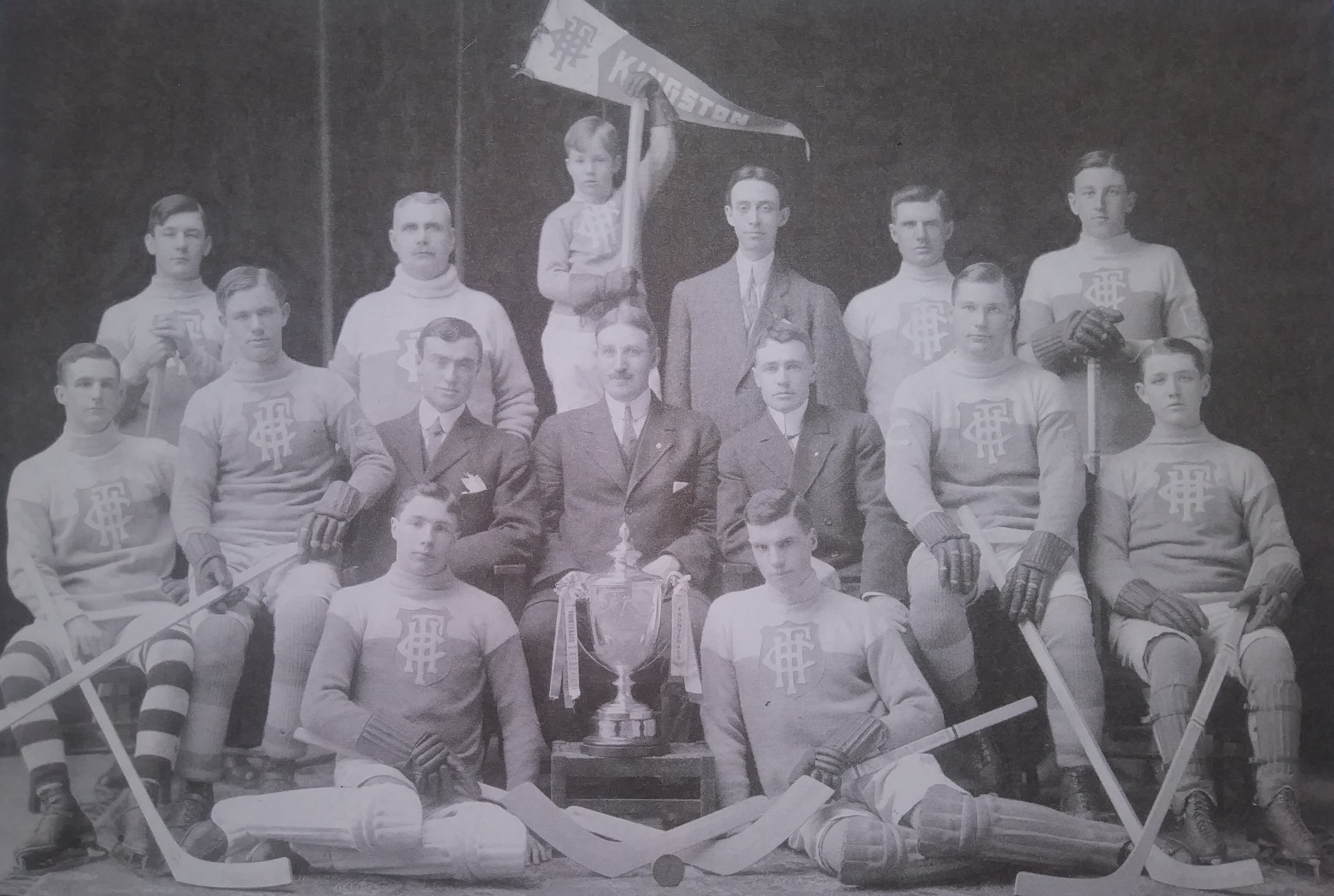
1910-11 Kingston Frontenacs juniors and the J. Ross Robertson Cup

The original Kingston Frontenacs were founded in 1897, named after Louis de Buade de Frontenac, governor of New France, who established Fort Frontenac on the site of present-day Kingston. The original Frontenacs were coached by James T. Sutherland, played in the intermediate division of the Ontario Hockey Association (OHA), and won the inaugural J. Ross Robertson Cup during the 1898–99 season.

The Kingston Frontenacs had a junior ice hockey team in the OHA prior to World War I. This version of the Frontenacs won the J. Ross Robertson Cup in the 1910–11 season. National Hockey League alumni from this team are Alec Connell, Bill Cook, Allan Davidson, and Flat Walsh.

An Ontario Hockey Association (OHA) Sr. League team also existed from the 1910s to 1940s. National Hockey League alumni from this team are Mickey Blake, Glen Brydson, Bill Cook, Gus Giesebrecht, Doug Stevenson, Charles Stewart, Carl Voss and Flat Walsh. Some members of this team then formed an entry in the Ontario Veteran's Hockey League during World War II. National Hockey League alumni from this team are Hub Macey, Gus Marker, Walt McCartney and Ed Nicholson.

=== 1952–1973 ===
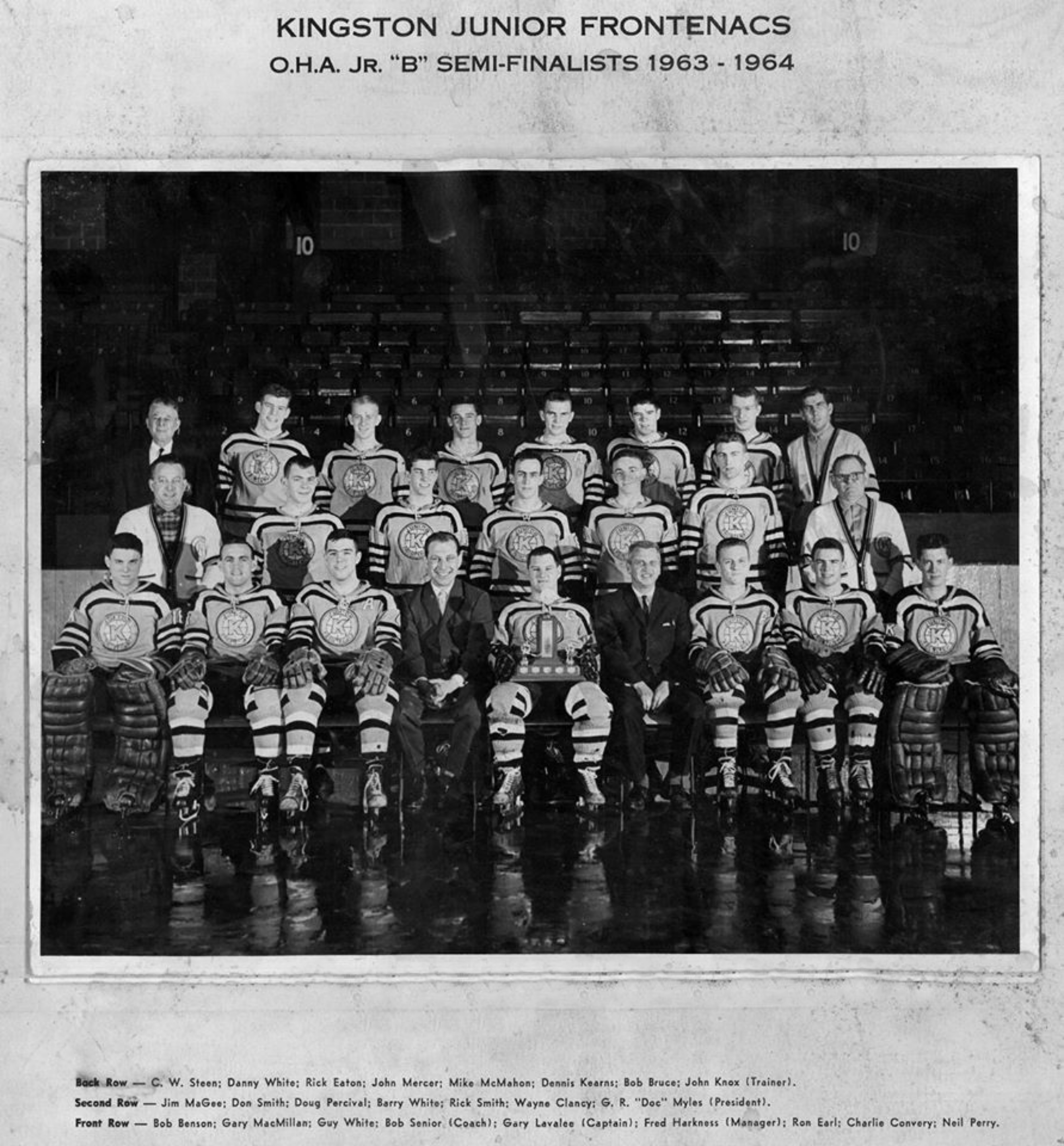
Kingston Junior Frontenacs OHA Jr Semi-Finalists 1963-64

In 1952, the Kingston Victoria were renamed the Kingston Frontenacs. They won the Eastern Jr. B championship in the 1953–54 and 1955–56 seasons. This Frontenacs team lost in the 1963 Sutherland Cup final to the St. Marys Lincolns, 4 games to 1.

From 1959 to 1963, there was also a Kingston Frontenacs team in the Eastern Professional Hockey League.

=== Kingston Canadians (1973–1988) ===
The Kingston Canadians arrival in the Ontario Hockey Association (OHA) for the 1973–74 season was a result of the Montreal Junior Canadiens move to the Quebec Major Junior Hockey League (QMJHL) in 1972. During the summer of 1972, the QMJHL had threatened a lawsuit against the OHA to force the Junior Canadiens to return to the Quebec-based league. To solve the problem, the OHA granted the Junior Canadiens franchise a "one-year suspension" of operations, while team ownership transferred the team and players into the QMJHL, renaming themselves the Montreal Bleu Blanc Rouge in the process.

After a one-year hiatus, the OHA then reactivated the suspended franchise under new ownership and with new players, calling the team the Kingston Canadians. The new Kingston team was essentially an expansion franchise promoted from the OHA's Tier II league, that had only common name to share with the old Junior Canadiens. The Tier II Frontenacs originated in the Eastern Junior B Hockey League and date back to at least the early 1940s as the Kingston Victorias. However, in some OHA histories (such as the annual Media Guide) the Kingston team is still shown as the legitimate successors of the Junior Canadiens' legacy.

=== Kingston Raiders (1988–89) ===
Following a change in ownership the club was renamed Kingston Raiders for one season in 1988–89. Due to ownership problems, the team was sold again following that season.

=== Kingston Frontenacs (1989–present) ===
In 1989, the new ownership, including Wren Blair, Don Anderson and Bob Attersley, renamed the team Kingston Frontenacs after the Eastern Professional Hockey League team. The Boston Bruins-style uniforms and logos were revived from the old franchise. The city embraced and welcomed the new ownership. Wren Blair and Bob Attersley were both hockey legends in their own right. In 1997 Wren Blair would be honoured with the Bill Long Award for distinguished service in the OHL. The club was sold to the Springer family of Kingston in June 1998, with Doug Springer becoming the owner and governor.

The Frontenacs franchise has the second-longest championship drought in the OHL (to the Sudbury Wolves by one year), and the fourth-longest in the Canadian Hockey League. The Frontenacs won the Leyden Trophy as the OHL's East Division champions in the 1994–95 and 2015–16. In the 1992–93 season, the Frontenacs reached the Eastern Conference Final but lost to the Peterborough Petes. In 2017-18, Kingston reached the Eastern Conference final for the second time in club history, however, they lost to the Hamilton Bulldogs.

== Coaches ==
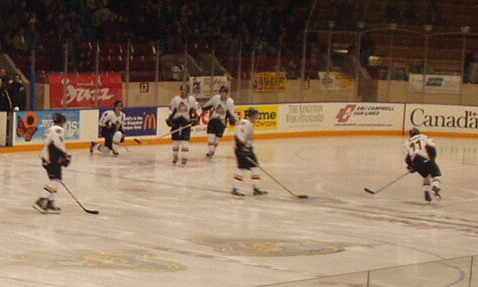
Frontenacs pre-game skate.

During the inaugural season of the Kingston Canadians in 1973–74, Jack Bownass was awarded the Matt Leyden Trophy as OHA Coach of the Year. Former NHL defenceman Jim Morrison coached the team from 1975 to 1982, which was the longest stint a coach had when the club was known as the Canadians.

Larry Mavety coached the Frontenacs for much of the team's history. He originally coached the team in 1988–89, when they were still known as the Kingston Raiders. In 1989–90, the first season the franchise was known as the Frontenacs, he won the Matt Leyden Trophy as the OHL Coach of the Year. Mavety returned to Kingston in 1997 to become the head coach once again, and stayed in that position until midway through the 2002–03 season when he stepped down to focus on his general manager duties. After a slow start in the 2007–08 season, Mavety once again found himself coaching the Frontenacs until November 2008. Mavety remained as the general manager until the end of the 2010–11 season.

A number of Frontenacs coaches have gone on to coach in the National Hockey League; while Gary Agnew and Dave Allison had short spells as NHL head coaches, Bruce Cassidy is the only Frontenacs coach to become a full-time NHL head coach.

=== List of coaches ===
(Multiple years in parentheses, totals include all incarnations of the Kingston franchise)

- 1973–1975 Jack Bownass (2)
- 1975–1982 Jim Morrison (7)
- 1982–1983 Rod Graham
- 1983–1985 Rick Cornacchia (2)
- 1985–1985 Jim Dorey (2)
- 1985–1987 Fred O'Donnell (2)
- 1987–1988 Jacques Tremblay
- 1988–1988 Jim Dorey (2)
- 1988–1990 Larry Mavety (10)
- 1990–1991 Randy Hall
- 1991–1992 Paul Cook
- 1992–1994 Dave Allison (2)
- 1994–1997 Gary Agnew (3)
- 1997–2003 Larry Mavety (10)
- 2002–2003 Greg Bignell
- 2003–2006 Jim Hulton (3)
- 2006–2007 Bruce Cassidy (2)
- 2007–2008 Larry Mavety (10)
- 2008–2011 Doug Gilmour (3)
- 2011–2014 Todd Gill (3)
- 2014–2017 Paul McFarland (4) (Note: McFarland was to coach the 2020–21 season that ended up being cancelled and left before the 2021–22 season.)
- 2017–2018 Jay Varady
- 2018–2020 Kurtis Foster (2)
- 2021–2023 Luca Caputi
- 2023–present Troy Mann

== Players ==
Paul Coffey is the only former member of the Kingston franchise to be inducted into the Hockey Hall of Fame, getting the honour in 2004. In 1977–78, Coffey played for the Kingston Canadians, as a late season addition from the North York Rangers. He played eight games with the Canadians.

=== Honoured numbers ===
Several numbers have been honoured by the Kingston Canadians/Frontenacs. In 2019, Chris Clifford had his number 29 retired, joining Mike O'Connell, Brad Rhiness, Tony McKegney, and Ken Linseman in receiving the honour. In 2023, brothers Anthony Stewart and Chris Stewart had their numbers raised to the rafters.

Larry Mavety is the only builder to be honoured by the organization for his work as a coach and general manager. The coach and manager holds the Kingston Frontenacs all-time wins record with 246.

=== Award winners ===
CHL Player of the Year

- 1994–95 David Ling

CHL Goaltender of the Year

- 1999–2000 Andrew Raycroft

CHL Rookie of the Year

- 2019–20 Shane Wright

Bobby Smith Trophy
Scholastic Player of the Year

- 1985–86 Chris Clifford
- 2009–10 Erik Gudbranson

Dan Snyder Memorial Trophy
Humanitarian of the Year

- 1992–93 Keli Corpse
- 2007–08 Peter Stevens
- 2023–24 Mason Vaccari

Dave Pinkney Trophy
Lowest Team G.A.A.

- 1989–90 Jeff Wilson & Sean Gauthier

Eddie Powers Memorial Trophy
OHL Scoring Champion

- 1983–84 Tim Salmon

Emms Family Award
Rookie of the Year

- 1991–92 Chris Gratton
- 2019–20 Shane Wright

F.W. "Dinty" Moore Trophy
Lowest Rookie G.A.A.

- 1988–89 Jeff Wilson

Jack Ferguson Award
First Overall Draft Pick

- 1985 Bryan Fogarty
- 1988 Drake Berehowsky
- 2019 Shane Wright

Jim Mahon Memorial Trophy
Top Scoring Right Winger

- 1994–95 David Ling
- 2021–22 Lucas Edmonds

Max Kaminsky Trophy
Most Outstanding Defenceman

- 1974–75 Mike O'Connell
- 1997–98 Chris Allen

OHL Goaltender of the Year

- 1994–95 Tyler Moss
- 1999–2000 Andrew Raycroft
- 2014–2015 Lucas Peressini

Red Tilson Trophy
Most Outstanding Player

- 1994–95 David Ling
- 1999–2000 Andrew Raycroft

William Hanley Trophy
Most Sportsmanlike Player

- 1983–84 Kevin Conway
- 1997–98 Matt Bradley
- 1999–2000 Mike Zigomanis

=== Team captains ===
- 1989-1990, Wayne Doucet
- 1990–1991, Geoff Schneider
- 1991–1992, Dave Stewart
- 1992–1993, none
- 1993–1994, Keli Corpse
- 1994–1995, David Ling
- 1995–1996, Marc Moro
- 1996–1997, Cail MacLean
- 1997–1998, Colin Chaulk
- 1998–1999, Kevin Grimes
- 1999–2001, Michael Zigomanis
- 2001–2002, Andrew Ianiero
- 2002–2003, Cory Stillman
- 2003–2005, Anthony Stewart
- 2005–2006, Adam Nemeth
- 2006–2007, Chris Stewart
- 2007–2008, Cory Emmerton / Justin Wallingford
- 2008–2009, Erik Gudbranson / George Lovatsis / Brian Lashoff
- 2009–2010, Brian Lashoff
- 2010–2011, Taylor Doherty
- 2011–2012, Tyler J. Brown / Cody Alcock
- 2012–2013, Cody Alcock
- 2013–2014, Michael Moffat
- 2014–2016, Roland McKeown
- 2016–2017, Stephen Desrocher
- 2017–2018, Ted Nichol
- 2018–2019, Ryan Cranford
- 2019–2020, Jakob Brahaney
- 2021–2022, Shane Wright
- 2022–2024, Paul Ludwinski
- 2024–2025, Quinton Burns
- 2025–2026, Jacob Battaglia / Vann Williamson

2026-2027,  Vann Willamson

=== First-round draft picks ===
The Kingston franchise has had several players selected in the first round of the NHL draft.

- Alex Forsyth – 18th overall, Washington Capitals, 1975 Draft
- Mark Suzor – 17th overall, Philadelphia Flyers, 1976 Draft
- Mike Crombeen – 5th overall, Cleveland Barons, 1977 Draft
- Mike Gillis – 5th overall, Colorado Rockies, 1978 Draft
- Behn Wilson – 6th overall, Philadelphia Flyers, 1978 Draft
- Ken Linseman – 7th overall, Philadelphia Flyers, 1978 Draft
- Jay Wells – 16th overall, Los Angeles Kings, 1979 Draft
- Rik Wilson – 12th overall, St. Louis Blues, 1980 Draft
- Mike Stothers – 21st overall, Philadelphia Flyers, 1980 Draft
- Kirk Muller – 2nd overall, New Jersey Devils, 1984 Draft
- Roger Belanger – 16th overall, Pittsburgh Penguins, 1984 Draft
- Scott Metcalfe – 20th overall, Edmonton Oilers, 1985 Draft
- Bryan Fogarty – 9th overall, Quebec Nordiques, 1987 Draft
- Scott Pearson – 6th overall, Toronto Maple Leafs, 1988 Draft
- Drake Berehowsky – 10th overall, Toronto Maple Leafs, 1990 Draft
- Chris Gratton – 3rd overall, Tampa Bay Lightning, 1993 Draft
- Brett Lindros – 9th overall, New York Islanders, 1994 Draft
- Chad Kilger – 4th overall, Mighty Ducks of Anaheim, 1995 Draft
- Kevin Grimes – 26th overall, Colorado Avalanche, 1997 Draft
- Anthony Stewart – 25th overall, Florida Panthers, 2003 Draft
- Chris Stewart – 18th overall, Colorado Avalanche, 2006 Draft
- Erik Gudbranson - 3rd overall, Florida Panthers, 2010 Draft
- Sam Bennett - 4th overall, Calgary Flames, 2014 Draft
- Lawson Crouse - 11th overall, Florida Panthers, 2015 Draft
- Shane Wright - 4th overall, Seattle Kraken, 2022 Draft

=== NHL alumni ===
Kingston Canadians

- Perry Anderson
- Scott Arniel
- Roger Belanger
- Neil Belland
- Phil Bourque
- Gord Buynak
- Jeff Chychrun
- Chris Clifford
- Paul Coffey
- Mike Crombeen
- Peter Dineen
- Brian Dobbin
- Peter Driscoll
- Richie Dunn
- Todd Elik
- Bryan Fogarty
- Mike Forbes
- Alex Forsyth
- Mike Gillis
- Ron Handy
- Greg Holst
- Greg Hotham
- Scott Howson
- Tim Kerr
- Marc Laforge
- Ken Linseman
- Darren Lowe
- Tom McCarthy
- Tony McKegney
- Scott Metcalfe
- Mike Moffat
- Kirk Muller
- Craig Muni
- Bernie Nicholls
- Mike O'Connell
- Scott Pearson
- Rob Plumb
- Walt Poddubny
- Paul Pooley
- Herb Raglan
- Moe Robinson
- Howard Scruton
- Steve Seftel
- Steve Seguin
- Mike Siltala
- Dennis Smith
- Mike Stothers
- Mark Suzor
- Jay Wells
- Behn Wilson
- Rik Wilson

Kingston Raiders

- Drake Berehowsky
- Tony Cimellaro
- Sean Gauthier
- Mark Major
- Scott Pearson
- Jason Simon

Kingston Frontenacs

- Chris Allen
- Sean Avery
- Chris Beckford-Tseu
- Sam Bennett
- Drake Berehowsky
- Matt Bradley
- Jan Bulis
- Tony Cimellaro
- Matt Cooke
- Lawson Crouse
- Michael Dal Colle
- Sean Day
- Patrick DesRochers
- Matt Elich
- Cory Emmerton
- Drew Fata
- Warren Foegele
- Sean Gauthier
- Chris Gratton
- Josh Gratton
- Philipp Grubauer
- Erik Gudbranson
- Max Jones
- Chad Kilger
- Nathan LaFayette
- Juho Lammikko
- Marc Lamothe
- Brian Lashoff
- Brett Lindros
- David Ling
- Mark Major
- Evan McEneny
- Roland McKeown
- Sean McMorrow
- Leevi Merilainen
- Jason Morgan
- Marc Moro
- Tyler Moss
- Shane O'Brien
- Alan Quine
- Andrew Raycroft
- Craig Rivet
- Jason Robertson
- Bryan Rodney
- Mike Smith
- Radek Smolenak
- Ryan Spooner
- Anthony Stewart
- Chris Stewart
- Daniel Taylor
- Gabriel Vilardi
- Shane Wright
- Michael Zigomanis

== Season-by-season results ==
Regular season and playoffs results:

- Kingston Frontenacs (1960–1973; EJBHL and OPJHL)
- Kingston Canadians (1973–1988)
- Kingston Raiders (1988–89)
- Kingston Frontenacs (1989–present)

Legend: GP = Games played, W = Wins, L = Losses, T = Ties, OTL = Overtime losses, SL = Shoot-out losses, Pts = Points, GF = Goals for, GA = Goals against

Memorial Cup champions	League champions	League finalists

Season	Regular season											Playoffs
Season	GP	W	L	T	OTL	SOL	Pts	Pct	GF	GA	Finish	Playoffs
1960–61	20	8	9	3	—	—	19	0.475	—	—	4th EJBHL	
1961–62	statistics unavailable											
1962–63	21	20	1	0	—	—	40	0.952	153	40	1st EJBHL	Won Eastern Jr. B championship Won Sutherland Cup quarterfinal (Lakeshore Bruins) 3–2; Won Sutherland Cup semifinal (Burlington Cougars) 3–0; Lost Sutherland Cup final (St. Marys Lincolns) 4–1
1963–64	30	14	11	5	—	—	33	0.550	150	122	1st EJBHL	Won Eastern Jr. B championship Won Sutherland Cup quarterfinal (Burlington Cougars) 4–1; Lost Sutherland Cup semifinal (Weston Dukes) 4–0
1964–65	26	12	11	3	—	—	25	0.519	—	—	1st EJBHL	Won Eastern Jr. B championship Lost Sutherland Cup quarterfinal (Hamilton Mountain Bees) 4–2
1965–66	34	23	9	2	—	—	48	0.706	226	140	1st EJBHL	
1966–67	statistics unavailable											
1967–68	31	13	14	4	—	—	30	0.484	155	135	4th EJBHL	
1968–69	30	15	13	2	—	—	32	0.533	—	—	3rd EJBHL	
1969–70	30	19	10	1	—	—	39	0.650	176	115	2nd EJBHL	Won Eastern Jr. B championship Lost Sutherland Cup semifinal (Hamilton Mountain Bees) 4–3
1970–71	30	14	11	5	—	—	33	0.550	183	170	3rd EJBHL	
1971–72	statistics unavailable											
1972–73	44	13	30	1	—	—	27	0.307	152	273	12th OPJHL	Did not qualify
Kingston Frontenacs renamed Kingston Canadians
1973–74	70	20	43	7	—	—	47	0.336	256	378	10th in OHA	Did not qualify
1974–75	70	25	35	10	—	—	60	0.429	297	345	8th in OMJHL	Lost quarterfinal (Toronto Marlboros) 9–7
1975–76	66	33	24	9	—	—	75	0.568	357	316	3rd in Leyden	Lost quarterfinal (Ottawa 67's) 9–5
1976–77	66	32	24	10	—	—	74	0.561	295	259	3rd in Leyden	Won quarterfinal (Sudbury Wolves) 9–3; Lost semifinal (Ottawa 67's) 9–7
1977–78	68	27	32	9	—	—	63	0.463	288	323	4th in Leyden	Lost preliminary round (Sault Ste. Marie Greyhounds) 6–4
1978–79	68	26	38	4	—	—	56	0.412	265	306	5th in Leyden	Won preliminary round (Ottawa 67's) 6–2; Lost quarterfinal (Peterborough Petes) 9–5
1979–80	68	35	26	7	—	—	77	0.566	320	298	4th in Leyden	Lost division quarterfinal (Sudbury Wolves) 3–0
1980–81	68	39	26	3	-	-	81	0.596	334	273	3rd in Leyden	Won division semifinal (Ottawa 67's) 9–5; Lost division final (Sault Ste. Marie Greyhounds) 9–5
1981–82	68	29	34	5	—	—	63	0.463	302	316	5th in Leyden	Lost division quarterfinal (Peterborough Petes) 6–2
1982–83	70	24	45	1	—	—	49	0.350	351	425	7th in Leyden	Did not qualify
1983–84	70	25	45	0	—	—	50	0.357	313	378	7th in Leyden	Did not qualify
1984–-85	66	18	47	1	—	—	37	0.280	239	380	7th in Leyden	Did not qualify
1985–86	66	35	28	3	—	—	73	0.553	297	257	4th in Leyden	Won division quarterfinal (Oshawa Generals) 8–4; Lost division semifinal round-robin (Peterborough Petes and Belleville Bulls)
1986–87	66	26	39	1	—	—	53	0.402	287	316	4th in Leyden	Won division quarterfinal (Belleville Bulls) 4–2; Lost division semifinal (Oshawa Generals) 4–2
1987–88	66	14	52	0	—	—	28	0.212	246	432	7th in Leyden	Did not qualify
Kingston Canadians renamed Kingston Raiders
1988–89	66	25	36	5	—	—	55	0.417	278	313	7th in Leyden	Did not qualify
Kingston Raiders renamed Kingston Frontenacs
1989–90	66	42	21	3	—	—	87	0.659	300	232	2nd in Leyden	Lost division quarterfinal (Belleville Bulls) 4–3
1990–91	66	15	47	4	—	—	34	0.258	255	382	8th in Leyden	Did not qualify
1991–92	66	16	44	6	—	—	38	0.288	241	316	8th in Leyden	Did not qualify
1992–93	66	36	19	11	—	—	83	0.629	314	265	2nd in Leyden	Won division quarterfinal (North Bay Centennials) 4–1; Won division semifinal (Oshawa Generals) 4–2; Lost division final (Peterborough Petes) 4–1
1993–94	66	30	28	8	—	—	68	0.515	265	259	5th in Leyden	Lost division quarterfinal (Belleville Bulls) 4–2
1994–95	66	40	19	7	—	—	87	0.659	284	224	1st in Eastern	Lost quarterfinal (Belleville Bulls) 4–2
1995–96	66	29	31	6	—	—	64	0.485	266	267	5th in Eastern	Lost division quarterfinal (Peterborough Petes) 4–1
1996–97	66	25	35	6	—	—	56	0.424	257	277	4th in Eastern	Lost division quarterfinal (Peterborough Petes) 4–1
1997–98	66	35	27	4	—	—	74	0.561	330	275	3rd in Eastern	Won division quarterfinal (Oshawa Generals) 4–3; Lost quarterfinal (London Knights) 4–1
1998–99	68	22	42	4	—	—	48	0.353	240	320	5th in East	Lost conference quarterfinal (Barrie Colts) 4–1
1999–2000	68	38	22	5	3	—	84	0.618	258	245	3rd in East	Lost conference quarterfinal (Sudbury Wolves) 4–1
2000–01	68	28	28	11	1	—	68	0.500	232	218	4th in East	Lost conference quarterfinal (Belleville Bulls) 4–0
2001–02	68	18	37	9	4	—	49	0.360	197	272	5th in East	Did not qualify (Note: Lost 8th-place tiebreaker (North Bay Centennials) 6–2)
2002–03	68	25	37	2	4	—	56	0.412	222	287	5th in East	Did not qualify
2003–04	68	30	28	7	3	—	70	0.515	210	221	2nd in East	Lost conference quarterfinal (Barrie Colts) 4–1
2004–05	68	28	33	4	3	—	63	0.463	219	242	4th in East	Did not qualify
2005–06	68	37	24	—	4	3	81	0.596	258	237	2nd in East	Lost conference quarterfinal (Sudbury Wolves) 4–2
2006–07	68	31	30	—	5	2	69	0.507	269	284	3rd in East	Lost conference quarterfinal (Oshawa Generals) 4–1
2007–08	68	25	41	—	0	2	52	0.382	230	317	5th in East	Did not qualify
2008–09	68	18	40	—	6	4	46	0.338	200	278	5th in East	Did not qualify
2009–10	68	33	30	—	2	3	71	0.522	229	251	2nd in East	Lost conference quarterfinal (Brampton Battalion) 4–3
2010–11	68	29	30	—	4	5	67	0.493	245	279	3rd in East	Lost conference quarterfinal (Oshawa Generals) 4–1
2011–12	68	19	41	—	3	5	46	0.338	188	290	5th in East	Did not qualify
2012–13	68	27	35	—	3	3	60	0.441	217	273	3rd in East	Lost conference quarterfinal (Barrie Colts) 4–0
2013–14	68	39	23	—	3	3	84	0.618	301	255	3rd in East	Lost conference quarterfinal (Peterborough Petes) 4–3
2014–15	68	32	28	—	5	3	72	0.529	196	197	3rd in East	Lost conference quarterfinal (North Bay Battalion) 4–0
2015–16	68	46	17	—	3	2	97	0.713	252	189	1st in East	Won conference quarterfinal (Oshawa Generals) 4–1; Lost conference semifinal (Niagara IceDogs) 4–0
2016–17	68	33	26	—	5	4	75	0.551	179	200	3rd in East	Won conference quarterfinal (Hamilton Bulldogs) 4–3; Lost conference semifinal (Peterborough Petes) 4–0
2017–18	68	36	23	—	6	3	81	0.596	243	202	2nd in East	Won conference quarterfinal (North Bay Battalion) 4–1; Won conference semifinal (Barrie Colts) 4–2; Lost conference final (Hamilton Bulldogs) 4–1
2018–19	68	14	52	—	1	1	30	0.221	144	307	5th in East	Did not qualify
2019–20	62	19	39	—	2	2	42	0.339	198	285	5th in East	Playoffs cancelled due to the COVID-19 pandemic
2020–21	Season cancelled due to the COVID-19 pandemic											
2021–22	68	41	22	—	4	1	87	0.640	285	242	2nd in East	Won conference quarterfinal (Oshawa Generals) 4–2; Lost conference semifinal (North Bay Battalion) 4–1
2022–23	68	27	38	—	1	2	57	0.419	199	260	5th in East	Did not qualify
2023–24	68	33	31	—	4	0	70	0.515	247	272	4th in East	Lost conference quarterfinal (North Bay Battalion) 4–1
2024–25	68	40	20	—	5	3	88	0.647	281	232	2nd in East	Won conference quarterfinal (Sudbury Wolves) 4–0; Lost conference semifinal (Barrie Colts) 4–3
2025–26	68	33	30	—	3	2	71	0.522	212	209	4th in East	Lost conference quarterfinal (Ottawa 67's) 4–0

== Team uniforms and logos ==

The original uniforms and logos of the OHL Frontenacs were revived from the EPHL franchise, which was affiliated with the Boston Bruins. The logo featured a yellow letter 'K' with a black outline, surrounded by black spokes leading to a yellow circle border with the name Kingston Frontenacs in black.

In 2002, the team adopted a new logo with a stylized Count Frontenac.

In 2007, the Frontenacs unveiled a 3rd jersey, which was black, yellow, and white, and similar to the Boston Bruins jerseys from the early 1970s. The "K" logo was used on the front of the jersey. The Frontenacs began wearing these jerseys on February 22, 2008, which was the same night that they opened their new arena.

In 2009, the Frontenacs, along with all CHL teams unveiled new uniforms using RBK EDGE templates. In 2012, the Frontenacs began wearing a newly designed set of uniforms featuring a large K as a logo.

== Arenas ==
The original home arena of the Frontenacs was the Kingston Memorial Centre, with a seating capacity of 3,079 seated, and 3,300 including standing room. Built in 1950, its ice size has unique dimensions of 200' x 92'.

The Kingston Frontenacs began play at their new downtown arena, Slush Puppie Place (then K-Rock Centre), in 2008.

== See also ==
- List of ice hockey teams in Ontario
