= Kingston Canadians =

Canadian junior ice hockey team (1973–1988)

- City: Kingston, Ontario
- League: Ontario Hockey League
- Conference: Leyden
- Founded: 1973–74
- Home arena: Kingston Memorial Centre
- Colours: Red, white and blue

Franchise history
- 1972–1973: Kingston Frontenacs Jr. A.
- 1973–1988: Kingston Canadians
- 1988–1989: Kingston Raiders
- 1989–present: Kingston Frontenacs

The Kingston Canadians were a junior ice hockey team in the Ontario Hockey League from 1973 to 1988. The team played home games at the Kingston Memorial Centre in Kingston, Ontario, Canada.

== History ==
The Kingston Canadians arrival in the Ontario Hockey Association (OHA) for the 1973–74 OHL season, was a result of the Montreal Junior Canadiens switch to the Quebec Major Junior Hockey League (QMJHL) in 1972. During the summer of 1972, the QMJHL had threatened a lawsuit against the OHA to force the Junior Canadiens to return to the Quebec-based league. The OHA granted the Junior Canadiens franchise a "one-year suspension" of operations, while team ownership transferred the team and players into the QMJHL, renaming themselves the Montreal Bleu Blanc Rouge.

The OHA reactivated the suspended franchise after a one-year hiatus, under new ownership and with new players, calling the team the Kingston Canadians. A group of Kingston business and professionals including J. Douglas Cunningham, purchased the rights from the Montreal Arena Corporation. The new Kingston team was an expansion franchise promoted from the Ontario Provincial Junior A Hockey League. The Kingston Canadians used the same colours and uniforms as the NHL's Montreal Canadiens and Junior Canadiens. The Kingston logo replaced the "H" with the letter "K" for Kingston.

The team played from 1973 to 1980 in the OHA, then from 1980 to 1988 in the OHL. In 1981, Kingston hosted the annual OHL All-Star game. In 1985–1986 season, Chris Clifford was the OHL first goalie to score a goal. Following a 28-game losing streak to end the 1987–88 season, the Canadians franchise was sold and renamed the team Kingston Raiders.

== Coaches ==
Jim Morrison coached the Canadians for almost half the team's tenure in the OHA & OHL. He was an NHL veteran defenceman of 704 games, as well as being a player coach with the AHL Baltimore Clippers.

Four other Canadians coaches also played in the NHL. They are, Jack Bownass, Rod Graham, Fred O'Donnell & Jim Dorey.

Jack Bownass was the recipient of the Matt Leyden Trophy as OHA Coach of the Year in 1973-1974.

List of Coaches

(Multiple years in parentheses)

- 1973–1975 Jack Bownass (2)
- 1975–1982 Jim Morrison (7)
- 1982–1983 Rod Graham
- 1983–1985 Rick Cornacchia (2)
- 1985–1985 Jim Dorey (2)
- 1985–1987 Fred O'Donnell (2)
- 1987–1988 Jacques Tremblay
- 1988–1988 Jim Dorey (2)

== Players ==
=== Award winners ===
Eddie Powers Memorial Trophy
Scoring Champion.

- 1983–84 Tim Salmon

Max Kaminsky Trophy
Most Outstanding Defenceman.

- 1974–75 Mike O'Connell

Jack Ferguson Award
First overall draft pick.

- 1985 Bryan Fogarty

William Hanley Trophy
Most Sportsmanlike OHL Player.

- 1983–84 Kevin Conway

Bobby Smith Trophy
Scholastic player of the year.

- 1985–86 Chris Clifford

=== Retired numbers ===
NONE. Five numbers have been "honoured" from the Kingston Canadians, although not retired and still in circulation. (#5 Mike O'Connell, #7 Tony McKegney, #10 Brad Rhiness, #14 Ken Linseman and #29 Chris Clifford).

=== Notable alumni ===
Sean Simpson played for the Canadians during the 1976–77 season, later coached Switzerland and Hungary at the Ice Hockey World Championships, and had a lengthy career coaching professional European hockey. Paul Coffey played for the Canadians during the 1977–78 season, and was inducted into the Hockey Hall of Fame in 2004. Jim Aldred played for the Canadians from 1979 to 1981, and became coach of the Portugal men's national team in 2017. Kevin Conway played for the Canadians during the 1983–84 season, was inducted into the British Ice Hockey Hall of Fame in 2005. Rick Fera played for the Canadians during the 1984–85 season, and had a lengthy British Hockey League career.

List of Canadians that also played in the National Hockey League or World Hockey Association:

- Perry Anderson
- Scott Arniel
- Roger Belanger
- Neil Belland
- Phil Bourque
- Gord Buynak
- Jeff Chychrun
- Chris Clifford
- Paul Coffey
- Mike Crombeen
- Peter Dineen
- Brian Dobbin
- Peter Driscoll
- Richie Dunn
- Todd Elik
- Bryan Fogarty
- Mike Forbes
- Alex Forsyth
- Mike Gillis
- Ron Handy
- Greg Holst
- Greg Hotham
- Scott Howson
- Tim Kerr
- Marc Laforge
- Ken Linseman
- Darren Lowe
- Tom McCarthy
- Tony McKegney
- Scott Metcalfe
- Mike Moffat
- Kirk Muller
- Craig Muni
- Bernie Nicholls
- Mike O'Connell
- Scott Pearson
- Rob Plumb
- Walt Poddubny
- Paul Pooley
- Herb Raglan
- Brad Rhiness
- Moe Robinson
- Howard Scruton
- Steve Seftel
- Steve Seguin
- Mike Siltala
- Dennis Smith
- Mike Stothers
- Mark Suzor
- Jay Wells
- Behn Wilson
- Rik Wilson

== Season-by-season results ==
Regular season and playoffs results:

Season	Games	Won	Lost	Tied	Points	Pct %	Goals for	Goals against	Standing	Playoffs
1973–74	70	20	43	7	47	0.336	256	378	10th in OHA	Did not qualify
1974–75	70	25	35	10	60	0.429	297	345	8th in OHA	Lost to Toronto Marlboros in quarterfinals 9 points to 7
1975–76	66	33	24	9	75	0.568	357	316	3rd in Leyden	Lost to Ottawa 67's in quarterfinals 9 points to 5
1976–77	66	32	24	10	74	0.561	295	259	3rd in Leyden	Defeated Sudbury Wolves in quarterfinals 9 points to 3 Lost to Ottawa 67's in semifinals 9 points to 7
1977–78	68	27	32	9	63	0.463	288	323	4th in Leyden	Lost to S.S.Marie Greyhounds in first round 6 points to 4
1978–79	68	26	38	4	56	0.412	265	306	5th in Leyden	Defeated Ottawa 67's in first round 6 points to 2 Lost to Peterborough Petes in quarterfinals 9 points to 5
1979–80	68	35	26	7	77	0.566	320	298	4th in Leyden	Lost to Sudbury Wolves in first round 3 games to 0
1980–81	68	39	26	3	81	0.596	334	273	3rd in Leyden	Defeated Ottawa 67's in division semifinals 9 points to 5 Lost to S.S. Marie Greyhounds in division finals 9 points to 5
1981–82	68	29	34	5	63	0.463	302	316	5th in Leyden	Lost to Peterborough Petes in first round 6 points to 2
1982–83	70	24	45	1	49	0.350	351	425	7th in Leyden	Did not qualify
1983–84	70	25	45	0	50	0.357	313	378	7th in Leyden	Did not qualify
1984–85	66	18	47	1	37	0.280	239	380	7th in Leyden	Did not qualify
1985–86	66	35	28	3	73	0.553	297	257	4th in Leyden	Defeated Oshawa Generals in first round 8 points to 4 Finished 3rd place in round-robin versus Peterborough Petes and Belleville Bulls
1986–87	66	26	39	1	53	0.402	287	316	4th in Leyden	Defeated Belleville Bulls in first round 4 games to 2 Lost to Oshawa Generals in quarterfinals 4 games to 2
1987–88	66	14	52	0	28	0.212	246	432	7th in Leyden	Did not qualify

== Kingston Memorial Centre ==
The home arena of the Canadians was the Kingston Memorial Centre with a seating capacity 3,079 seated, and 3,300 including standing room.
