= Bryan Fogarty =

Canadian ice hockey player (1969–2002)

- Born: June 11, 1969 Montréal, Québec, Canada
- Died: March 6, 2002 (aged 32) Myrtle Beach, South Carolina, U.S.
- Height: 6 ft 2 in (188 cm)
- Weight: 210 lb (95 kg; 15 st 0 lb)
- Position: Defence
- Shot: Left
- Played for: Quebec Nordiques; Pittsburgh Penguins; Montreal Canadiens; HC Davos; HC Milano; Hannover Scorpions
- NHL draft: 9th overall, 1987; Quebec Nordiques
- Playing career: 1989–2001

Bryan Charles Fogarty (June 11, 1969 – March 6, 2002) was a Canadian ice hockey defenceman who played for the Quebec Nordiques, Pittsburgh Penguins and Montreal Canadiens. He set several records while in the junior leagues and was a high draft choice in the National Hockey League (NHL). However, his hockey career was marred by persistent alcohol and drug use, which prevented him from playing a full season at any point and led to him being frequently traded.

== Playing career ==
Fogarty began playing hockey as a young boy. His sister Lynn says "I think [hockey] was hard-wired into our [family's] veins." His older brother played street hockey and Lynn says he thought "I want to be like those big kids and I want to be out there and I'm going to play." Brantford Minor Hockey Association coordinator Bob Coyne said that Fogarty's hockey skills were apparent "from day one." Coyne compared Fogarty to Wayne Gretzky, who had also grown up in Brantford, saying "[Gretzky's] game was outsmarting everybody else. Fogarty's game was outperforming everybody else."

Fogarty played in the 1982 Quebec International Pee-Wee Hockey Tournament with a minor ice hockey team from Brantford.

In the mid-to-late 1980s, Fogarty played with the Ontario Hockey League (OHL). He was chosen first overall in the 1985 OHL draft by Ken Slater of the Kingston Canadians, ahead of several other future NHL players, including Adam Graves (6th), Bryan Marchment (12th), Brendan Shanahan (13th), and Jody Hull (14th). Slater says Fogarty attracted a lot of attention early on, and some of his games had as many as 40 scouts in attendance — "They couldn't believe the hockey sense and the puck control."

Fogarty was drafted ninth overall by the Quebec Nordiques in 1987. He finished the 1987–88 season with the Canadians before being traded to the Niagara Falls Thunder. The 1988–89 season with the Thunder was "the year of his life" and he broke several long-standing hockey records. That year he scored 47 goals and 108 assists, breaking the records for both most goals and most assists scored by a defenceman in a single season. The records had previously been held by Bobby Orr and Doug Crossman, respectively. His 155 total points also broke the Canadian Hockey League record for most points scored by a defenceman in a single season, previously held by Cam Plante. That season, Fogarty scored an average of 2.583 points in his 60 games, and is the record holder in that category. At the end of the year, Fogarty was named the Canadian major-junior player of the year.

According to Max Offenburger, a sports psychologist who worked with Fogarty frequently, he once asked Thunder coach Bill LaForge about Fogarty. LaForge responded by calling Fogarty over and making a bet with him — if Fogarty scored seven points in that night's game, he'd win US$50; if not, he'd take Offenburger and LaForge out to dinner. During the third period of the game, Fogarty scored his fourth assist with teammate Keith Primeau, for a total of seven points. Afterwards, he skated over to the bench and said to LaForge, "I win. Do I have to play any more?"

During his time with the Nordiques he continued to be regarded as an excellent player. Fogarty maintains the distinction of recording the last natural hat trick in Quebec Nordiques franchise history when he scored three straight goals on December 1, 1990, in a 4–2 home win over the Sabres. He was the first Nordiques defenceman to record a hat trick.

But around 1990, his alcoholism and drug addiction began to impact his hockey career. Following a stint in a rehab facility, Fogarty was traded to the Pittsburgh Penguins in 1992. In 1993, the Penguins suspended Fogarty and he returned to rehab. Over the next several years Fogarty played for numerous minor and major league teams, though he spent little time with any one team because none of them wanted to deal with the hassles his alcoholism brought.

In 1999, following some legal troubles, Fogarty attempted a comeback with the Toronto Maple Leafs' affiliate, the St. John's Maple Leafs. He lasted 3 regular season games with them before being released. He then played two more seasons with some minor league teams, but "only as a favour to some friends" In total, he played nine seasons of pro hockey in seven leagues for 17 teams, retiring in 2001.

== Personal life ==
Fogarty was born in 1969 in Montreal, Quebec to parents Tom and Virginia, the youngest of five, and the family moved to Brantford when he was a young boy. He had two sisters and two brothers. According to Ken Campbell, Fogarty started drinking at age 14. When Fogarty was 15 he was already playing with players who were much older than him due to his exceptional skill level, and would frequent bars and strip clubs with the older players. During his time with the Kingston Canadians he was nicknamed "Tippy" because, according to teammate Marc Laforge, "he was always tipsy".

Over the next few years, Fogarty's alcoholism and drug addiction worsened. In a 2012 interview with ESPN magazine, Ron Tugnutt, Fogarty's teammate with the Nordiques, shared a story about an incident that happened around 1990 which made the team much more concerned about Fogarty. Several team members stayed out late drinking one night and Fogarty had drunk a lot, and the team worried he might not make it to practice the next day. However, Fogarty was the first to the rink and "skat[ed] circles around people" during practice. Tugnutt recalls, "If I drank like he did [that] night, I wouldn't be able to drag myself out of bed in the morning. But it wasn't affecting him. That's when we all became more concerned."

In February 1991, Fogarty checked into a rehab center in Minneapolis, Minnesota, where he met John Kordic. Nordiques general manager Pierre Pagé extended a job offer to Kordic, on the condition that he stay sober and off cocaine. Pagé also made arrangements for Kordic and Fogarty to be roommates at the rehab center, hoping they could help each other stay sober. In the fall and winter of 1991, Fogarty stayed clean with the help of Kordic. In January 1992, Kordic began using drugs again and died of a heart attack in August of that year. Even though they had drifted apart towards the end of Kordic's life, Fogarty still blamed himself for Kordic's death, feeling like he had failed as a friend. In November 1992 he said "It opened my eyes. When you know someone that close with the same kind of problems — it showed what can happen."

Around that same time, Pagé made a deal with Fogarty. If he could stay sober for three months, Pagé would trade him to another team. Fogarty managed to stay sober for five months, and was traded to the Pittsburgh Penguins. He met his wife Jennifer while she was performing a modeling job at a charity event for the Penguins, and the two married in late 1992. Fogarty eventually relapsed and in January 1993 was suspended indefinitely from the Penguins, checking into rehab again shortly after.

In 1999, Fogarty was arrested and charged with drug possession after a break-in at a school in Brantford. Fogarty was charged with breaking and entering, and possession of a controlled substance. According to the police report, Fogarty broke open the kitchen doors at the Tollgate Technological Skills Centre and was found standing naked in the kitchen with cooking oil spilled on the floor around him. He was granted a conditional discharge, placed on probation for one year, and was ordered to donate $500 to a local addiction service after he pleaded guilty to one count of mischief.

He returned to Brantford to take over the family business, Fogarty's Mobile Canteen, while playing games for various minor league teams on the side. After retiring from hockey in 2001, Fogarty remained clean and sober for more than a year. The last stretch of Fogarty's life was "completely different" and "peaceful at the end," according to Jennifer. She says he didn't really miss hockey after retiring, and speculates he may have never wanted to go pro at all. In 2002, she told the Globe & Mail, "He missed the guys, he missed the camaraderie, but not the game."

== Death ==
Fogarty died in Myrtle Beach, South Carolina on March 6, 2002. Fogarty and his wife Jennifer's uncle, Thomas Branch, were staying at a motel called the Compass Cove, to do some deep sea fishing. He and Branch arrived on the morning of March 5. After checking in, they went right to the bar, where they spent most of the day drinking. The next morning, Branch was unable to wake Fogarty, and called EMS. Fogarty was transported to the Grand Strand Regional Center where he was pronounced dead shortly after. The coroner reported that Fogarty died of an enlarged heart. He is interred at Holy Cross Cemetery in Brantford.

Jennifer and Offenburger both believe that the stress from hockey played a major role in Fogarty's death. In an interview with the Globe & Mail, Jennifer said "In hockey, he was just a piece of meat. There wasn't a place he played that he wasn't expected to do everything. The game was simply too stressful for him, and he would drink to hide the anxiety." Offenburger expressed a similar sentiment, saying "his perception of hockey, and what he thought he had achieve [sic], caused him great stress. He was happiest if he was playing hockey for fun – think of the example when he scored seven points for Niagara Falls."

== Career statistics ==
			Regular season					Playoffs
Season	Team	League	GP	G	A	Pts	PIM	GP	G	A	Pts	PIM
1983–84	Brantford Alexanders	OHL	1	0	0	0	0	—	—	—	—	—
1984–85	Aurora Tigers	OPJHL	42	9	12	21	57	14	9	27	36	50
1985–86	Kingston Canadians	OHL	47	2	17	19	14	10	1	3	4	4
1986–87	Kingston Canadians	OHL	56	20	50	70	46	12	2	3	5	5
1987–88	Kingston Canadians	OHL	48	11	36	47	50	—	—	—	—	—
1988–89	Niagara Falls Thunder	OHL	60	47	108	155	88	17	10	22	32	36
1989–90	Halifax Citadels	AHL	22	5	14	19	6	6	2	4	6	0
1989–90	Quebec Nordiques	NHL	45	4	10	14	31	—	—	—	—	—
1990–91	Halifax Citadels	AHL	5	0	2	2	0	—	—	—	—	—
1990–91	Quebec Nordiques	NHL	45	9	22	31	24	—	—	—	—	—
1991–92	Quebec Nordiques	NHL	20	3	12	15	16	—	—	—	—	—
1991–92	Halifax Citadels	AHL	2	0	0	0	2	—	—	—	—	—
1991–92	New Haven Nighthawks	AHL	4	0	1	1	6	—	—	—	—	—
1991–92	Muskegon Lumberjacks	IHL	8	2	4	6	30	—	—	—	—	—
1992–93	Pittsburgh Penguins	NHL	12	0	4	4	4	—	—	—	—	—
1992–93	Cleveland Lumberjacks	AHL	15	2	5	7	8	3	0	1	1	17
1993–94	Atlanta Knights	IHL	8	1	5	6	4	—	—	—	—	—
1993–94	Las Vegas Thunder	IHL	33	3	16	19	38	—	—	—	—	—
1993–94	Kansas City Blades	IHL	3	2	1	3	2	—	—	—	—	—
1993–94	Montreal Canadiens	NHL	13	1	2	3	10	—	—	—	—	—
1994–95	Montreal Canadiens	NHL	21	5	2	7	34	—	—	—	—	—
1995–96	HC Davos	NDA	1	0	0	0	0	2	1	1	2	0
1995–96	Detroit Vipers	IHL	18	1	5	6	14	—	—	—	—	—
1995–96	Minnesota Moose	IHL	17	3	12	15	24	—	—	—	—	—
1996–97	HC Milano 24	ITA	16	8	20	28	30	—	—	—	—	—
1996–97	Kansas City Blades	IHL	22	3	9	12	10	—	—	—	—	—
1997–98	Hannover Scorpions	DEL	33	7	18	25	69	10	1	0	1	6
1998–99	Indianapolis Ice	IHL	36	7	15	22	28	—	—	—	—	—
1998–99	Baton Rouge Kingfish	ECHL	5	4	3	7	24	4	1	3	4	8
1999–2000	Hannover Scorpions	DEL	22	5	11	16	34	—	—	—	—	—
1999–2000	St. John's Maple Leafs	AHL	3	0	0	0	0	—	—	—	—	—
1999–2000	Knoxville Speed	UHL	16	5	12	17	29	—	—	—	—	—
2000–01	Huntsville Tornado	CHL	11	1	4	5	16	—	—	—	—	—
2000–01	Elmira Jackals	UHL	18	1	8	9	16	—	—	—	—	—
AHL totals			36	5	17	22	14	—	—	—	—	—
NHL totals			156	22	52	74	119	—	—	—	—	—
IHL totals			160	24	72	96	158	3	0	1	1	17

== Awards ==
- OHL First All-Star Team (1987, 1989)
- Red Tilson Trophy (OHL MVP) (1989)
- CHL Defenceman of the Year (1989)
- CHL Player of the Year (1989)
- U.A.P./N.A.P.A. AUTOPRO Plus-Minus Award (1989)

== Records ==
- Last natural hat trick by a Nordiques defenceman (Dec 1/90 against Buffalo Sabres, 4–2 win)
- Most points in a season by a defenceman (CHL) – 155 (47G, 108A), 1988–89
- Most goals in a season by a defenceman (OHL) – 47, 1988–89
- Most assists in a season by a defenceman (OHL) – 108, 1988–89
- Most points in a game by a defenceman (OHL) – 8 (3 goals, 5 assists) – November 11, 1988 – vs. Sudbury Wolves

== In popular culture ==
Dave Bidini's song "The Land is Wild", released as the title track of the Bidiniband's debut release in June 2009, tells the life story of Fogarty.

Preceded by Dave Moylan	Jack Ferguson Award; 1985	Succeeded by Troy Mallette
Preceded by Ken McRae	Quebec Nordiques first-round draft pick 1987	Succeeded by Joe Sakic
Preceded by Joe Sakic	CHL Player of the Year; 1989	Succeeded by Mike Ricci
