= Steve Seftel =

Canadian ice hockey player (born 1968)

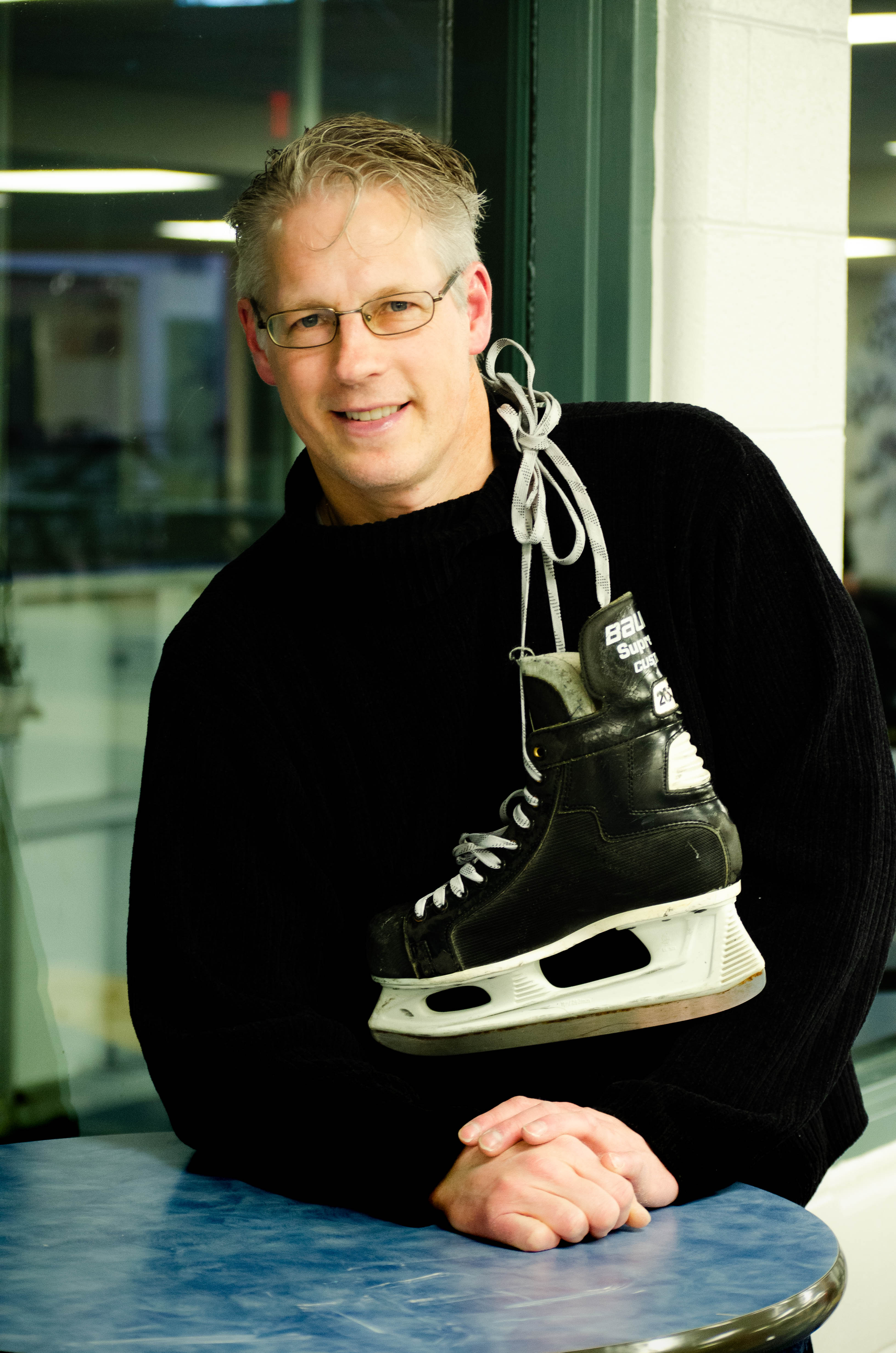
- Seftel in 2020
- Born: May 14, 1968 (age 58) Kitchener, Ontario, Canada
- Height: 6 ft 3 in (191 cm)
- Weight: 200 lb (91 kg; 14 st 4 lb)
- Position: Left Wing
- Shot: Left
- Played for: Washington Capitals
- NHL draft: 40th overall, 1986; Washington Capitals
- Playing career: 1988–1992

Steven Jerome Seftel (born May 14, 1968) is a Canadian retired ice hockey forward and author. He played four games in the National Hockey League with the Washington Capitals during the 1990–91 season. The rest of his career, which lasted from 1988 to 1992, was spent in the minor leagues. He was selected in the second round, 40th overall by the Capitals in the 1986 NHL entry draft. After his playing career be began writing, and his book titled "Shattered Ice" was published in 2019.

== Early life and education ==
Seftel was born in Kitchener, Ontario in 1968. His parents were Robert (Bob) Seftel of Kitchener, Ontario and Joan Miller of Waterloo, Ontario. He has a brother named Bradley. He played locally for the Kitchener Bauer Krauts and Kitchener Greenshirts of the Ontario Minor Hockey Association. Seftel was drafted 31st overall by the Kingston Canadians of the Ontario Hockey League in the 1985 OHL Priority Selection. He attended St. Jerome's Catholic High School in Kitchener. Seftel was drafted 40th overall by the Washington Capitals in the 1986 NHL entry draft

== Playing career ==
Seftel starred as a Midget player for two seasons with the hometown Kitchener Greenshirts from 1983 to 1985, playing in 130 games, scoring 171 points (94 goals and 77 assists). He began the 1985-86 season with the Kingston Canadians of the Ontario Hockey League. He played for the Canadians from 1985 to 1988, playing in 162 games, scoring 166 points (64 goals and 102 assists). Perhaps the best rookie at the 1985 Canadians training camp, his OHL career was delayed due to a broken ankle before the regular season started. Sustained a torn anterior cruciate ligament (ACL) in his left knee versus the Sault Ste. Marie Greyhounds in November 1986 and missed 12 games. Led the Canadians in scoring in his final season of junior hockey. After completing his junior hockey career in the Ontario Hockey League, he finished the 1987-88 campaign with the Binghamton Whalers of the American Hockey League (AHL) and played 3 games, scoring no points.

Seftel began the 1988-89 season with the Baltimore Skipjacks of the American Hockey League, where he had 27 points (12G-15A) in 58 games. He scored his first professional goal with the Baltimore Skipjacks on October 15, 1988 versus the Hershey Bears at the Hersheypark Arena, He spent the 1989-90 season with the Skipjacks, picking up 29 points (10G-19A) in 74 games played. He chipped in with 7 points (4G-3A) in 12 playoff games with Baltimore.

The following year Seftel spent most of the 1990-91 season with Baltimore, picking up 44 points (22G-22A) in 66 games. He went pointless in 6 playoff games with the Skipjacks. He made his National Hockey League debut on January 22, 1991 in a road game versus the Detroit Red Wings at the Joe Louis Arena. The Capitals winning the game 2-1 in overtime. The game featured head coaches and brothers Bryan Murray (ice hockey) and Terry Murray, Seftel suited up during the Super Series#Super Series 1991, for the Washington Capitals versus HC Dynamo Moscow in a 3-2 Washington victory. He assisted on the game-winning goal by winger Jeff Greenlaw.

Seftel started the 1991-92 season on the injured reserve list after off-season Anterior cruciate ligament (ACL) surgery on his left knee. After nine months of extensive rehabilitation, he returned to game play and earned 8 points (2G-6A) in 18 games played with Baltimore. March 17, 1992 in an American Hockey League match versus the Cape Breton Oilers, Seftel sustained a torn anterior cruciate ligament injury in his right knee which ended his season. He started the 1992-93 season again with the Skipjacks and head coach Barry Trotz. Knee injuries limited his mobility over the next four months and he chose to retire from hockey. After retiring from hockey Seftel's right anterior cruciate ligament was surgically repaired in Kingston, Ontario at Hotel Dieu Hospital.

== Writing ==
Seftel wrote his self-published memoir "Shattered Ice" long after his playing career ended. Shattered Ice, explores his past, weaving players, coaches, friends, places, and struggles. The book also describes his internal struggles with mental health and coming to terms with his illness. The former NHLer is now managing his health in a new way and has become an advocate for increasing awareness and reducing stigma about mental health and suicide. In 2023 Seftel wrote his second book titled Bobby Backchex and the Giant Jellyfish.

== Bibliography ==
=== Non-fiction ===
- Seftel Steve (2023)."Bobby Backchex & the Giant Jellyfish", Art of Hockey
- Seftel Steve (2019). Shattered Ice, Art of Hockey

== Personal life ==
Seftel and his wife Lisa have two children.

== Career statistics ==
=== Regular season and playoffs ===
			Regular season					Playoffs
Season	Team	League	GP	G	A	Pts	PIM	GP	G	A	Pts	PIM
1984-85	Kitchener Greenshirts Midget	Midget	69	58	52	110	176	—	—	—	—	—
1985–86	Kingston Canadians	OHL	42	11	16	27	53	10	2	1	3	14
1986–87	Kingston Canadians	OHL	54	21	43	64	55	12	1	4	5	9
1987–88	Kingston Canadians	OHL	66	32	43	75	51	—	—	—	—	—
1987–88	Binghamton Whalers	AHL	3	0	0	0	2	—	—	—	—	—
1988–89	Baltimore Skipjacks	AHL	58	12	15	27	70	—	—	—	—	—
1989–90	Baltimore Skipjacks	AHL	74	10	19	29	52	12	4	3	7	10
1990–91	Washington Capitals	NHL	4	0	0	0	2	—	—	—	—	—
1990–91	Baltimore Skipjacks	AHL	66	22	22	44	46	6	0	0	0	14
1991–92	Baltimore Skipjacks	AHL	18	2	6	8	27	—	—	—	—	—
AHL totals			219	46	62	108	197	18	4	3	7	24
NHL totals			4	0	0	0	2	—	—	—	—	—
