= Bobby Smith Trophy =

Sports award in the Ontario Hockey League

- Sport: Ice hockey
- Awarded for: Scholastic Player of the Year

History
- First award: 1980
- Most recent: Carter George

The Bobby Smith Trophy is awarded annually to the Ontario Hockey League Scholastic Player of the Year, who best combines high standards of play and academic excellence. The trophy is named for Bobby Smith, a former Ottawa 67's player who graduated from Laurentian High School with a 75% average while leading the league in scoring. It is symbolic of the high standard of excellence that Smith displayed on the ice, as well as in the classroom, during his outstanding junior career. Each team's nominee for the award becomes a member of the OHL Scholastic Team of the Year. The award is selected by a committee of OHL educational consultants, and by the director of NHLCentral Scouting. Each recipient is nominated for the CHL Scholastic Player of the Year award.

== Winners ==
List of recipients of the Bobby Smith Trophy.

- Blue background denotes also named CHL Scholastic Player of the Year

Season	Winner	Team
1979–80	Steve Konroyd	Oshawa Generals
1980–81	Doug Smith	Ottawa 67's
1981–82	Dave Simpson	London Knights
1982–83	Dave Gagner	Brantford Alexanders
1983–84	Scott Tottle	Peterborough Petes
1984–85	Craig Billington	Belleville Bulls
1985–86	Chris Clifford	Kingston Canadians
1986–87	John McIntyre	Guelph Platers
1987–88	Darrin Shannon	Windsor Spitfires
1988–89	Brian Collinson	Toronto Marlboros
1989–90	Ryan Kuwabara	Ottawa 67's
1990–91	Nathan LaFayette	Cornwall Royals
1991–92	Nathan LaFayette	Cornwall Royals
1992–93	Tim Spitzig	Kitchener Rangers
1993–94	Ethan Moreau	Niagara Falls Flyers
1994–95	Jamie Wright	Guelph Storm
1995–96	Boyd Devereaux	Kitchener Rangers
1996–97	Jake McCracken	Sault Ste. Marie Greyhounds
1997–98	Manny Malhotra	Guelph Storm
1998–99	Rob Zepp	Plymouth Whalers
1999–00	Brad Boyes	Erie Otters
2000–01	Dustin Brown	Guelph Storm
2001–02	Dustin Brown	Guelph Storm
2002–03	Dustin Brown	Guelph Storm
2003–04	Scott Lehman	Toronto St. Michael's Majors
2004–05	Richard Clune	Sarnia Sting
2005–06	Danny Battochio	Ottawa 67's
2006–07	Steven Stamkos	Sarnia Sting
2007–08	Ryan Ellis	Windsor Spitfires
2008–09	Matt Duchene	Brampton Battalion
2009–10	Erik Gudbranson	Kingston Frontenacs
2010–11	Dougie Hamilton	Niagara IceDogs
2011–12	Adam Pelech	Erie Otters
2012–13	Darnell Nurse	Sault Ste. Marie Greyhounds
2013–14	Connor McDavid	Erie Otters
2014–15	Connor McDavid	Erie Otters
2015–16	Nicolas Hague	Mississauga Steelheads
2016–17	Sasha Chmelevski	Ottawa 67's
2017–18	Barrett Hayton	Sault Ste. Marie Greyhounds
2018–19	Thomas Harley	Mississauga Steelheads
2019–20	Cole Perfetti	Saginaw Spirit
2020–21	Not awarded, season cancelled due to COVID-19 pandemic	
2021–22	Owen Beck	Mississauga Steelheads
2022–23	Colby Barlow	Owen Sound Attack
2023–24	Carter George	Owen Sound Attack
2024–25	Michael Misa	Saginaw Spirit
2025–26	Levi Harper	Saginaw Spirit

== See also ==
- Marcel Robert Trophy – Quebec Major Junior Hockey League Scholastic Player of the Year
- Daryl K. (Doc) Seaman Trophy – Western Hockey League Scholastic Player of the Year
- List of Canadian Hockey League awards
