= Jack Ferguson Award =

Ice hockey award

- Sport: Ice hockey
- Awarded for: Top pick in OHL Priority Selection Draft

History
- First award: 1981
- Most recent: Kane Cloutier (2026)

The Jack Ferguson Award is awarded each year to the top draft pick in the Ontario Hockey League priority selection draft. The trophy is named in honour of Jack Ferguson, a former director of OHL Central Scouting.

== Winners ==
List of OHL first overall draft picks.

denotes player later became an NHL first overall draft pick

Year	Winner	Team
1981	Dan Quinn	Belleville Bulls
1982	Kirk Muller	Guelph Platers
1983	Trevor Stienburg	Guelph Platers
1984	Dave Moylan	Sudbury Wolves
1985	Bryan Fogarty	Kingston Canadians
1986	Troy Mallette	Sault Ste. Marie Greyhounds
1987	John Uniac	Sudbury Wolves
1988	Drake Berehowsky	Kingston Raiders
1989	Eric Lindros	Sault Ste. Marie Greyhounds
1990	Pat Peake	Detroit Compuware Ambassadors
1991	Todd Harvey	Detroit Compuware Ambassadors
1992	Jeff O'Neill	Guelph Storm
1993	Alyn McCauley	Ottawa 67's
1994	Jeff Brown	Sarnia Sting
1995	Daniel Tkaczuk	Barrie Colts
1996	Rico Fata	London Knights
1997	Charlie Stephens	Toronto St. Michael's Majors
1998	Jay Harrison	Brampton Battalion
1999	Jason Spezza	Mississauga IceDogs
2000	Patrick Jarrett	Mississauga IceDogs
2001	Patrick O'Sullivan	Mississauga IceDogs
2002	Rob Schremp	Mississauga IceDogs
2003	Patrick McNeill	Saginaw Spirit
2004	John Hughes	Belleville Bulls
2005	John Tavares	Oshawa Generals
2006	Steven Stamkos	Sarnia Sting
2007	Ryan O'Reilly	Erie Otters
2008	John McFarland	Sudbury Wolves
2009	Daniel Catenacci	Sault Ste. Marie Greyhounds
2010	Alex Galchenyuk	Sarnia Sting
2011	Aaron Ekblad	Barrie Colts
2012	Connor McDavid	Erie Otters
2013	Travis Konecny	Ottawa 67's
2014	Jakob Chychrun	Sarnia Sting
2015	David Levin	Sudbury Wolves
2016	Ryan Merkley	Guelph Storm
2017	Ryan Suzuki	Barrie Colts
2018	Quinton Byfield	Sudbury Wolves
2019	Shane Wright	Kingston Frontenacs
2020	Ty Nelson	North Bay Battalion
2021	Quentin Musty	Sudbury Wolves
2022	Michael Misa	Saginaw Spirit
2023	Matthew Schaefer	Erie Otters
2024	Ethan Belchetz	Windsor Spitfires
2025	Kaden McGregor	Peterborough Petes
2026	Kane Cloutier	Oshawa Generals

== See also ==
- List of Canadian Hockey League awards
