= Herb Raglan =

Canadian ice hockey player

- Born: August 5, 1967 (age 58) Peterborough, Ontario, Canada
- Height: 6 ft 0 in (183 cm)
- Weight: 208 lb (94 kg; 14 st 12 lb)
- Position: Right wing
- Shot: Right
- Played for: St. Louis Blues; Quebec Nordiques; Tampa Bay Lightning; Ottawa Senators
- NHL draft: 37th overall, 1985; St. Louis Blues
- Playing career: 1986–1998

Herbert Raglan (born August 5, 1967) is a Canadian former professional ice hockey player, who played 343 games in the National Hockey League with the St. Louis Blues, Quebec Nordiques, Tampa Bay Lightning, and Ottawa Senators.

Raglan was born in Peterborough, Ontario, and his father was Clare Raglan. As a youth, he played in the 1980 Quebec International Pee-Wee Hockey Tournament with a minor ice hockey team from Peterborough.

== Career statistics ==
			Regular season					Playoffs
Season	Team	League	GP	G	A	Pts	PIM	GP	G	A	Pts	PIM
1984–85	Kingston Canadians	OHL	58	20	22	42	166	—	—	—	—	—
1985–86	Kingston Canadians	OHL	28	10	9	19	88	10	5	2	7	30
1985–86	St. Louis Blues	NHL	7	0	0	0	5	10	1	1	2	24
1986–87	St. Louis Blues	NHL	62	6	10	16	159	4	0	0	0	2
1987–88	St. Louis Blues	NHL	73	10	15	25	190	10	1	3	4	11
1988–89	St. Louis Blues	NHL	50	7	10	17	144	8	1	2	3	13
1989–90	St. Louis Blues	NHL	11	0	1	1	21	—	—	—	—	—
1990–91	St. Louis Blues	NHL	32	3	3	6	52	—	—	—	—	—
1990–91	Quebec Nordiques	NHL	15	1	3	4	30	—	—	—	—	—
1991–92	Quebec Nordiques	NHL	62	6	14	20	120	—	—	—	—	—
1992–93	Halifax Citadels	AHL	28	3	9	12	83	—	—	—	—	—
1992–93	Atlanta Knights	IHL	24	4	10	14	139	9	3	3	6	32
1992–93	Tampa Bay Lightning	NHL	2	0	0	0	2	—	—	—	—	—
1993–94	Kalamazoo Wings	IHL	29	6	11	17	112	5	0	0	0	32
1993–94	Ottawa Senators	NHL	29	0	0	0	52	—	—	—	—	—
1994–95	Kalamazoo Wings	IHL	31	4	4	8	94	6	0	0	0	15
1995–96	Brantford Smoke	CoHL	69	46	38	84	267	12	9	6	15	58
1996–97	Central Texas Stampede	WPHL	33	14	18	32	131	10	7	3	10	30
1996–97	Brantford Smoke	CoHL	11	5	4	9	33	2	3	1	4	4
1997–98	Brantford Smoke	UHL	17	8	10	18	38	—	—	—	—	—
NHL totals			343	33	56	89	775	32	3	6	9	50
