= Fred O'Donnell =

Canadian ice hockey player and coach

- Born: December 6, 1949 (age 76) Kingston, Ontario, Canada
- Height: 5 ft 10 in (178 cm)
- Weight: 175 lb (79 kg; 12 st 7 lb)
- Position: Right wing
- Shot: Right
- Played for: Boston Bruins; New England Whalers
- NHL draft: 37th overall, 1969; Minnesota North Stars
- Playing career: 1970–1976

Frederick James O'Donnell (born December 6, 1949, in Kingston, Ontario, and raised in Gananoque, Ontario) is a Canadian retired professional ice hockey player and coach. During his professional playing career, which lasted from 1970 to 1976, he played 115 games in the National Hockey League with the Boston Bruins and 155 games in the World Hockey Association with the New England Whalers, mainly at left wing. He later coached the Queen's University Golden Gaels hockey program for several seasons in the late 1970s and early 1980s, leading the team to the Ontario University Athletics title in 1981 (winning the Queen's Cup), and a berth in the national championship tournament that year in Calgary. He then coached the Kingston Canadians Major Junior hockey team for two seasons, from 1985 to 1987. O'Donnell later worked in real estate in Kingston. He was inducted into the Kingston and District Sports Hall of Fame.

== Career statistics ==
=== Regular season and playoffs ===
			Regular season					Playoffs
Season	Team	League	GP	G	A	Pts	PIM	GP	G	A	Pts	PIM
1966–67	Oshawa Generals	OHA	36	6	9	15	44	—	—	—	—	—
1967–68	Oshawa Generals	OHA	44	24	14	38	72	—	—	—	—	—
1968–69	Oshawa Generals	OHA	54	31	27	58	124	—	—	—	—	—
1969–70	Oklahoma City Blazers	CHL	2	2	2	4	0	—	—	—	—	—
1970–71	Oklahoma City Blazers	CHL	67	23	23	46	158	5	4	1	5	30
1971–72	Boston Braves	AHL	62	16	22	38	161	—	—	—	—	—
1972–73	Boston Bruins	NHL	72	10	4	14	55	5	0	1	1	5
1973–74	Boston Bruins	NHL	43	5	7	12	43	—	—	—	—	—
1974–75	New England Whalers	WHA	76	21	15	36	84	3	0	0	0	15
1975–76	New England Whalers	WHA	79	11	11	22	81	17	2	5	7	20
WHA totals			155	32	26	58	165	20	2	5	7	35
NHL totals			115	15	11	26	98	5	0	1	1	5

== Coaching record ==
Team	Year	Regular season							Postseason
Team	Year	G	W	L	T	OTL	Pts	Finish	Result
KGN	1985–86	66	35	28	3	-	73	4th in Leyden	Lost in Second Round
KGN	1986–87	66	26	39	1	-	53	4th in Leyden	Lost in Second Round

Preceded by Jim Dorey	Head Coaches of the Kingston Canadians; 1985–1987	Succeeded by Jacques Tremblay
