= Tim Armstrong (ice hockey) =

Canadian ice hockey player

- Born: May 12, 1967 (age 57); Toronto, Ontario, Canada
- Height: 5 ft 11 in (180 cm)
- Weight: 168 lb (76 kg; 12 st 0 lb)
- Position: Centre
- Shot: Right
- Played for: Toronto Maple Leafs; VEU Feldkirch
- NHL draft: 211th overall, 1985; Toronto Maple Leafs
- Playing career: 1987–1991

Timothy S. Armstrong (born May 12, 1967) is a Canadian retired professional ice hockey player. He played 11 games in the National Hockey League with the Toronto Maple Leafs during the 1988–89 season. The rest of his career, which lasted from 1987 to 1991, was mainly spent in the American Hockey League.

== Early life ==
Armstrong was born in Toronto, Ontario. As a youth, he played in the 1980 Quebec International Pee-Wee Hockey Tournament with the Toronto Young Nationals minor ice hockey team.

== Career ==
Armstrong played 11 games for his hometown Toronto Maple Leafs in the 1988–89 NHL season, scoring one goal.

== Personal life ==
His daughter, Hannah Armstrong was part of Canada's National Women's Under-18 Team to a gold medal at the 2010 IIHF World Women's Under-18 Championship in Chicago. As a member of the gold medal-winning squad, a hockey card of hers was featured in the Upper Deck 2010 World of Sportscard series.

== Career statistics ==
=== Regular season and playoffs ===
			Regular season					Playoffs
Season	Team	League	GP	G	A	Pts	PIM	GP	G	A	Pts	PIM
1983–84	Markham Waxers	OJAHL	42	24	41	65	41	—	—	—	—	—
1984–85	Toronto Marlboros	OHL	63	17	45	62	28	5	5	2	7	0
1985–86	Toronto Marlboros	OHL	64	35	69	104	36	4	1	3	4	9
1986–87	Toronto Marlboros	OHL	66	29	55	84	61	—	—	—	—	—
1986–87	Newmarket Saints	AHL	5	3	0	3	2	—	—	—	—	—
1987–88	Newmarket Saints	AHL	78	19	40	59	26	—	—	—	—	—
1988–89	Toronto Maple Leafs	NHL	11	1	0	1	6	—	—	—	—	—
1988–89	Newmarket Saints	AHL	37	16	24	40	38	—	—	—	—	—
1989–90	Newmarket Saints	AHL	63	25	37	62	24	—	—	—	—	—
1990–91	VEU Feldkirch	AUT	5	0	2	2	0	—	—	—	—	—
1990–91	Binghamton Rangers	AHL	56	24	32	66	37	10	1	6	7	6
AHL totals			239	87	133	220	127	10	1	6	7	6
NHL totals			11	1	0	1	6	—	—	—	—	—
