= Chris Clifford =

Canadian ice hockey player

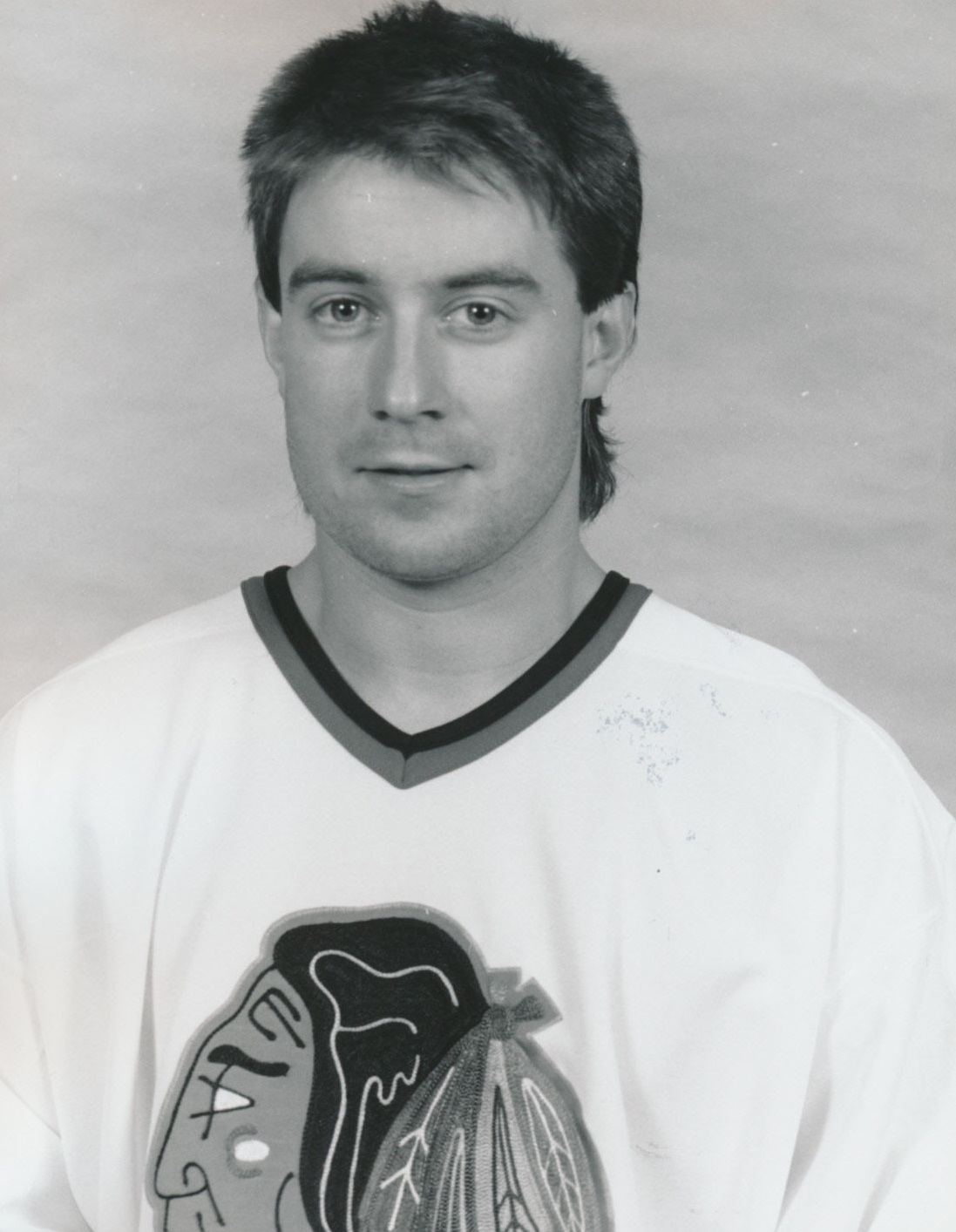
- Clifford in 1988
- Born: May 26, 1966 (age 60) Kingston, Ontario, Canada
- Height: 5 ft 9 in (175 cm)
- Weight: 170 lb (77 kg; 12 st 2 lb)
- Position: Goaltender
- Caught: Left
- Played for: Chicago Black Hawks
- NHL draft: 111th overall, 1984; Chicago Black Hawks
- Playing career: 1984–1989

Chris Clifford (born May 26, 1966) is a Canadian former professional ice hockey goaltender, who played in parts of two games in the National Hockey League with the Chicago Black Hawks. He filled in for Murray Bannerman in a 1985 game and for Ed Belfour in a 1989 game. He won the Bobby Smith Trophy in 1985–86. Clifford was drafted in the sixth round of the 1984 NHL entry draft. Chris is considered the first goalie to score a goal in OHL history. He later became a lawyer.

== Playing career ==
Clifford was born in Kingston, Ontario. He spent his junior career with the Ontario Hockey League's Kingston Canadians and most of his professional career with various teams in the International Hockey League. Clifford became the first goaltender in Ontario Hockey League history to score a goal. In December 2019, Chris Clifford had his jersey number retired by the Kingston Frontenacs joining 4 other players in the franchise's history.

He remains an active member of the Ottawa Senators and Chicago Blackhawk Alumni networks.

== Post-playing career ==
After his hockey career, Clifford attended law school at Queen's University and is now a partner at Bergeron Clifford LLP in Ontario, Canada. He has consistently ranked as one of the top injury lawyers in Canada and is a recognized Top Lawyer in the country. Since 2015, Clifford has been recognized as a Best Lawyer in Canada for his work in personal injury litigation. Along with his business partner Edward Bergeron, Clifford has also received recognition from the Law Society of Ontario as a Certified Specialist in Civil Litigation.

Clifford also served as a trustee to the Law Foundation of Ontario until 2016.

== Career statistics ==
=== Regular season and playoffs ===
			Regular season									Playoffs
Season	Team	League	GP	W	L	T	MIN	GA	SO	GAA	SV%	GP	W	L	MIN	GA	SO	GAA	SV%
1982–83	Brockville Braves	CJHL	32	—	—	—	1746	126	1	4.33	—	—	—	—	—	—	—	—	—
1983–84	Kingston Canadians	OHL	50	16	28	0	2808	229	2	4.89	—	—	—	—	—	—	—	—	—
1984–85	Chicago Black Hawks	NHL	1	0	0	0	20	0	0	0.00	1.000	—	—	—	—	—	—	—	—
1984–85	Kingston Canadians	OHL	52	15	34	0	2768	241	0	5.22	—	—	—	—	—	—	—	—	—
1985–86	Kingston Canadians	OHL	50	26	21	3	2988	178	1	3.57	.866	10	5	5	564	31	1	3.30	—
1986–87	Kingston Canadians	OHL	44	18	25	0	2576	188	1	4.38	—	12	6	6	730	42	0	3.45	—
1987–88	Saginaw Hawks	IHL	22	9	7	2	1146	80	0	4.19	—	—	—	—	—	—	—	—	—
1988–89	Chicago Blackhawks	NHL	1	0	0	0	5	0	0	0.00	1.00	—	—	—	—	—	—	—	—
1988–89	Saginaw Hawks	IHL	7	4	2	0	321	23	0	4.30	—	—	—	—	—	—	—	—	—
1989–90	Muskegon Lumberjacks	IHL	23	17	4	1	1352	77	0	3.42	—	6	3	3	360	24	0	4.01	—
1989–90	Virginia Lancers	ECHL	10	7	1	0	547	16	0	1.75	.954	—	—	—	—	—	—	—	—
1990–91	Muskegon Lumberjacks	IHL	56	24	26	4	3247	215	1	3.97	—	5	1	4	299	20	0	4.01	—
1991–92	Fort Wayne Komets	IHL	2	2	0	0	120	4	0	2.00	—	—	—	—	—	—	—	—	—
1991–92	Louisville Icehawks	ECHL	56	29	19	6	3151	223	0	4.25	.864	13	7	6	780	53	0	4.08	—
1992–93	Muskegon Fury	CoHL	19	8	8	2	1038	82	1	4.74	.858	2	—	—	117	11	0	5.64	—
1993–94	Louisville Icehawks	ECHL	35	11	18	4	1894	152	0	4.82	.857	1	0	0	8	1	0	7.17	—
NHL totals			2	0	0	0	25	0	0	0.00	1.000	—	—	—	—	—	—	—	—
