= Neil Belland =

Canadian ice hockey player

- Born: April 3, 1961 (age 65) Parry Sound, Ontario, Canada
- Height: 5 ft 11 in (180 cm)
- Weight: 180 lb (82 kg; 12 st 12 lb)
- Position: Defence
- Shot: Left
- Played for: Vancouver Canucks; Pittsburgh Penguins
- NHL draft: Undrafted
- Playing career: 1981–1987

Neil G. Belland (born April 3, 1961) is a Canadian former professional ice hockey player.

== Playing career ==
Belland was born in Parry Sound, Ontario. He played his junior hockey with the Kingston Canadians of the OMJHL from 1978 to 1981, putting up some solid numbers, as he recorded 182 points (43 goals-139 assists) in 171 games, including a huge 1980–81 season where Belland had 82 points (28G-54A) in only 53 games. He added on 16 points (8G-8A) in 25 career playoff games. Belland went undrafted, but was signed by the Vancouver Canucks as a free agent on October 1, 1980.

Belland started the 1981–82 season with the Dallas Black Hawks of the CHL, where in 27 games he put up 22 points (2G-20A) before being called up by the Canucks. Belland played 28 games with Vancouver, earning 9 points (3G-6A). He helped the Canucks in the playoffs to the tune of 8 points (1G-7A) in 17 games as Vancouver would make it to the Stanley Cup finals before losing to the powerhouse New York Islanders. Belland split the 1982–83 season between Vancouver, where in 14 games he had 6 points (2G-4A), and the Fredericton Express of the AHL, as he had 21 points (4G-17A) in 46 games, then chipped in with 3 points (1G-2A) in 7 playoff games. Once again in 1983–84, Belland split time between the Express, where in 17 games he registered 18 points (3G-15A), before getting 20 points (7G-13A) in 44 games with Vancouver. He then added 3 points (1G-2A) in 4 playoff games with the Canucks. 1984–85 would be more of the same for Belland, as he again spent time with both Fredericton, getting 41 points (7G-34A) in 57 games, along with 2 assists in 6 playoff games, and Vancouver, earning 6 assists in 13 regular season games, and then again in 1985–86, where Belland put up 3 points (1G-2A) in 7 games with the Canucks, and 24 points (6G-18A) in 36 games with Fredericton, then helping out with 7 points (1G-6A) in 6 playoff games with the Express. After the season, Belland became a free agent, and signed a contract with the Pittsburgh Penguins on September 29, 1986.

Belland spent most of the 1986–87 season with the Penguins AHL affiliate, the Baltimore Skipjacks, where in 61 games, he recorded 24 points (6G-18A), while in 3 games with the Penguins, he earned an assist. He became a free agent once again after the season, and decided to move to Finland to play with Lukko Rauma in the SM-liiga. Belland earned 22 points (8G-14A) in 44 games before going pointless in 8 playoff games, then joined the Hershey Bears of the AHL for a playoff game, getting no points.

He then signed with Innsbruck EV of the Austrian Hockey League for the 1988–89 season, putting up 56 points (17G-39A) in 46 games, then returned for the 1989–90 season, earning 53 points (15G-38A) in 34 games. Belland split the 1990–91 season with Innsbruck, getting 12 points (5G-7A) in 17 games, and the Canadian National Hockey Team, where in 9 games he garnered 4 assists. Belland returned to Austria in 1991–92 to play with ATSE Graz, earning 22 points (11G-11A) in 28 games, then play 1 game for EC Graz in 1992–93, getting no points, before returning for the 1993–94 season, picking up 37 points (8G-29A) in 57 games. Belland retired from playing hockey in the summer of 1994.

=== Regular season and playoffs ===
| | | | Regular season | | | | | Playoffs |
| Season | Team | League | GP | G | A | Pts | PIM | GP | G | A | Pts | PIM |
|---|---|---|---|---|---|---|---|---|---|---|---|---|
| 1978–79 | Kingston Canadians | OMJHL | 64 | 8 | 41 | 49 | 14 | — | — | — | — | — |
| 1979–80 | Kingston Canadians | OMJHL | 54 | 7 | 44 | 51 | 44 | — | — | — | — | — |
| 1980–81 | Kingston Canadians | OHL | 53 | 28 | 54 | 82 | 45 | — | — | — | — | — |
| 1981–82 | Vancouver Canucks | NHL | 28 | 3 | 6 | 9 | 16 | 17 | 1 | 7 | 8 | 16 |
| 1981–82 | Dallas Black Hawks | CHL | 27 | 2 | 20 | 22 | 18 | — | — | — | — | — |
| 1982–83 | Vancouver Canucks | NHL | 14 | 2 | 4 | 6 | 4 | — | — | — | — | — |
| 1982–83 | Fredericton Express | AHL | 46 | 4 | 17 | 21 | 12 | 7 | 1 | 2 | 3 | 8 |
| 1983–84 | Vancouver Canucks | NHL | 44 | 7 | 13 | 20 | 24 | 4 | 1 | 2 | 3 | 7 |
| 1983–84 | Fredericton Express | AHL | 17 | 3 | 15 | 18 | 2 | — | — | — | — | — |
| 1984–85 | Vancouver Canucks | NHL | 13 | 0 | 6 | 6 | 6 | — | — | — | — | — |
| 1984–85 | Fredericton Express | AHL | 57 | 7 | 34 | 41 | 31 | 6 | 0 | 2 | 2 | 4 |
| 1985–86 | Vancouver Canucks | NHL | 7 | 1 | 2 | 3 | 4 | — | — | — | — | — |
| 1985–86 | Fredericton Express | AHL | 36 | 6 | 18 | 24 | 10 | 6 | 1 | 6 | 7 | 2 |
| 1986–87 | Baltimore Skipjacks | AHL | 61 | 6 | 18 | 24 | 12 | — | — | — | — | — |
| 1986–87 | Pittsburgh Penguins | NHL | 3 | 0 | 1 | 1 | 0 | — | — | — | — | — |
| 1987–88 | Lukko Rauma | FIN | 44 | 8 | 14 | 22 | 34 | — | — | — | — | — |
| 1987–88 | Hershey Bears | AHL | — | — | — | — | — | 1 | 0 | 0 | 0 | 0 |
| 1988–89 | Innsbruck EV | AUT | 46 | 17 | 39 | 56 | 0 | — | — | — | — | — |
| 1989–90 | Innsbruck EV | AUT | 34 | 15 | 38 | 53 | 51 | — | — | — | — | — |
| 1990–91 | Canadian National Team | Intl | 9 | 0 | 4 | 4 | 10 | — | — | — | — | — |
| 1990–91 | Innsbruck EV | AU | 17 | 5 | 7 | 12 | 0 | — | — | — | — | — |
| 1991–92 | ATSE Graz | AUT | 28 | 11 | 11 | 22 | 12 | — | — | — | — | — |
| 1992–93 | Graz EC | AUT | 1 | 0 | 1 | 1 | 0 | — | — | — | — | — |
| 1993–94 | Graz EC | AUT | 57 | 8 | 29 | 37 | 0 | — | — | — | — | — |
| AHL totals | | | 217 | 26 | 102 | 128 | 67 | 20 | 2 | 10 | 12 | 14 |
| NHL totals | | | 109 | 13 | 32 | 45 | 54 | 21 | 2 | 9 | 11 | 23 |
