= Robert Plumb =

Canadian ice hockey player (born 1957)

- Born: August 29, 1957 (age 67); Kingston, Ontario, Canada
- Height: 5 ft 9 in (175 cm)
- Weight: 170 lb (77 kg; 12 st 2 lb)
- Position: Centre
- Shot: Left
- Played for: Detroit Red Wings; Zürcher SC
- NHL draft: 163rd overall, 1977; Detroit Red Wings
- Playing career: 1977–1988

Robert Edwin "Rob" Plumb (born August 29, 1957) is a Canadian former professional ice hockey player who played fourteen games in the National Hockey League with the Detroit Red Wings during the 1977–78 and 1978–79 seasons. The rest of his career, which lasted from 1977 to 1988, was mainly spent in the National League B, the second-highest league in Switzerland. Robert is the brother of Ron Plumb.

== Career statistics ==
=== Regular season and playoffs ===
			Regular season					Playoffs
Season	Team	League	GP	G	A	Pts	PIM	GP	G	A	Pts	PIM
1974–75	Kingston Canadiens	OMJHL	58	9	16	25	41	8	2	4	6	9
1975–76	Kingston Canadiens	OMJHL	26	6	5	11	20	4	0	0	0	12
1976–77	Kingston Canadiens	OMJHL	64	20	31	51	73	13	8	4	12	18
1977–78	Kansas City Red Wings	CHL	55	18	11	29	34	—	—	—	—	—
1977–78	Detroit Red Wings	NHL	7	2	1	3	0	—	—	—	—	—
1978–79	Kansas City Red Wings	CHL	44	17	20	37	16	4	0	0	0	0
1978–79	Detroit Red Wings	NHL	7	1	1	2	2	—	—	—	—	—
1979–80	Adirondack Red Wings	AHL	18	1	2	3	8	—	—	—	—	—
1979–80	Kalamazoo Wings	IHL	56	24	44	68	39	13	4	4	8	24
1980–81	Kalamazoo Wings	IHL	82	54	55	109	70	8	3	1	4	4
1981–82	EHC Dübendorf	NLB	38	52	33	85	—	—	—	—	—	—
1982–83	EHC Dübendorf	NLB	38	37	39	76	—	—	—	—	—	—
1983–84	EHC Dübendorf	NLB	42	43	38	81	—	—	—	—	—	—
1984–85	EHC Dübendorf	NLB	37	45	48	93	—	—	—	—	—	—
1985–86	Zürcher SC	NLA	36	19	21	40	51	—	—	—	—	—
1986–87	EHC Uzwil	SWI-3	—	—	—	—	—	—	—	—	—	—
1987–88	EHC Uzwil	NLB	22	22	13	35	24	—	—	—	—	—
NLB totals			177	199	171	370	—	—	—	—	—	—
NHL totals			14	3	2	5	2	—	—	—	—	—
