= Mike Siltala =

Canadian ice hockey player (born 1963)

- Born: August 5, 1963 (age 62) Toronto, Ontario, Canada
- Height: 5 ft 9 in (175 cm)
- Weight: 170 lb (77 kg; 12 st 2 lb)
- Position: Right wing
- Shot: Right
- Played for: Washington Capitals; New York Rangers; Schwenninger ERC
- NHL draft: 89th overall, 1981; Washington Capitals
- Playing career: 1981–1989

Michael Siltala (born August 5, 1963) is a Canadian former professional ice hockey player. He played seven games in the National Hockey League with the Washington Capitals and New York Rangers between 1981 and 1987. The rest of his career, which lasted from 1981 to 1989, was mainly spent in the minor leagues.

== Playing career ==
Siltala was born in Toronto, Ontario. As a youth, he played in the 1976 Quebec International Pee-Wee Hockey Tournament with a minor ice hockey team from Sault Ste. Marie, Ontario. Originally drafted in 1981 by the Washington Capitals, Siltala played in three games for the Capitals, and later four more games with the New York Rangers.

== Career statistics ==
=== Regular season and playoffs ===
			Regular season					Playoffs
Season	Team	League	GP	G	A	Pts	PIM	GP	G	A	Pts	PIM
1980–81	Kingston Canadiens	OHL	63	18	22	40	23	14	5	6	11	20
1981–82	Kingston Canadiens	OHL	59	38	49	87	70	4	2	3	5	9
1981–82	Washington Capitals	NHL	3	1	0	1	2	—	—	—	—	—
1982–83	Kingston Canadiens	OHL	50	53	61	144	45	—	—	—	—	—
1982–83	Hershey Bears	AHL	9	0	3	3	2	—	—	—	—	—
1983–84	Hershey Bears	AHL	50	15	17	32	29	—	—	—	—	—
1984–85	Binghamton Whalers	AHL	75	42	36	78	53	5	5	5	10	0
1985–86	Binghamton Whalers	AHL	50	25	22	47	36	2	3	0	3	0
1986–87	New York Rangers	NHL	1	0	0	0	0	—	—	—	—	—
1986–87	New Haven Nighthawks	AHL	17	13	6	19	20	—	—	—	—	—
1987–88	New York Rangers	NHL	3	0	0	0	0	—	—	—	—	—
1987–88	New Haven Nighthawks	AHL	32	17	20	37	8	—	—	—	—	—
1987–88	Colorado Rangers	IHL	38	22	28	50	28	—	—	—	—	—
1988–89	Schwenninger ERC	GER	26	15	20	35	22	3	1	0	1	2
AHL totals			233	112	104	216	148	7	8	5	13	0
NHL totals			7	1	0	1	2	—	—	—	—	—
