= Dennis Smith (ice hockey) =

American ice hockey player (born 1964)

- Born: May 27, 1964 (age 60); Livonia, Michigan, U.S
- Height: 5 ft 11 in (180 cm)
- Weight: 190 lb (86 kg; 13 st 8 lb)
- Position: Defense
- Shot: Left
- Played for: Los Angeles Kings; Washington Capitals; VEU Feldkirch
- NHL draft: Undrafted
- Playing career: 1984–1997

Dennis Smith (born July 27, 1964) is an American former professional ice hockey defenseman. He played 8 games in the National Hockey League for the Washington Capitals and Los Angeles Kings during the 1989–90 and 1990–91 seasons. The rest of his career, which lasted from 1984 to 1997, was mainly spent in the minor leagues.

== Career statistics ==
=== Regular season and playoffs ===
			Regular season					Playoffs
Season	Team	League	GP	G	A	Pts	PIM	GP	G	A	Pts	PIM
1981–82	Kingston Canadians	OHL	48	2	23	25	83	4	0	2	2	0
1982–83	Kingston Canadians	OHL	65	6	24	30	90	—	—	—	—	—
1983–84	Kingston Canadians	OHL	62	10	40	50	136	—	—	—	—	—
1983–84	Erie Golden Blades	ACHL	2	1	1	2	0	9	2	4	6	8
1984–85	Osby IK	SWE-3	29	14	9	23	74	—	—	—	—	—
1984–85	Erie Golden Blades	ACHL	19	5	20	25	67	12	1	4	5	52
1985–86	Peoria Rivermen	IHL	70	5	15	20	102	10	0	2	2	18
1986–87	Adirondack Red Wings	AHL	64	4	24	28	120	6	0	0	0	8
1987–88	Adirondack Red Wings	AHL	75	6	24	30	213	11	2	2	4	47
1988–89	Adirondack Red Wings	AHL	75	5	35	40	176	17	1	6	7	47
1989–90	Washington Capitals	NHL	4	0	0	0	0	—	—	—	—	—
1989–90	Baltimore Skipjacks	AHL	74	8	25	33	103	12	0	3	3	65
1990–91	Los Angeles Kings	NHL	4	0	0	0	4	—	—	—	—	—
1990–91	New Haven Nighthawks	AHL	61	7	25	32	148	—	—	—	—	—
1991–92	Maine Mariners	AHL	59	2	32	34	63	—	—	—	—	—
1991–92	Baltimore Skipjacks	AHL	17	1	4	5	23	—	—	—	—	—
1992–93	VEU Feldkirch	AUT	25	7	19	26	27	—	—	—	—	—
1993–94	Providence Bruins	AHL	58	2	22	24	89	—	—	—	—	—
1994–95	Kalamazoo Wings	IHL	32	2	1	3	41	13	0	2	2	33
1994–95	Detroit Vipers	IHL	8	2	0	2	12	—	—	—	—	—
1995–96	Michigan K-Wings	IHL	49	0	10	10	62	10	0	0	0	6
1995–96	St. John's Maple Leafs	AHL	1	0	0	0	0	—	—	—	—	—
1996–97	Michigan K-Wings	IHL	62	2	7	9	60	3	0	0	0	6
AHL totals			484	35	191	226	935	46	3	11	14	167
NHL totals			8	0	0	0	4	—	—	—	—	—
