= Roger Belanger =

Canadian ice hockey player (1965–2011)

- Born: December 1, 1965 St. Catharines, Ontario, Canada
- Died: September 16, 2011 (aged 45) Welland, Ontario, Canada
- Height: 6 ft 0 in (183 cm)
- Weight: 190 lb (86 kg; 13 st 8 lb)
- Position: Centre
- Shot: Right
- Played for: Pittsburgh Penguins
- NHL draft: 16th overall, 1984; Pittsburgh Penguins
- Playing career: 1984–1988

Roger Richard Belanger (December 1, 1965 — September 16, 2011) was a Canadian professional ice hockey player. He played 44 games in the National Hockey League with the Pittsburgh Penguins during the 1984–85 season.

== Playing career ==
Belanger started his junior career with the London Knights of the OHL in 1982–83, getting 31 points (17 goals and 14 assists) in 68 games. However, an injury in the playoffs limited him to just one game, in which he had no points. Prior to the 1983–84 season, the Knights dealt Belanger to the Kingston Canadians. His offensive production exploded in Kingston, as he registered 90 points (44 goals and 46 assist in 67 games. The Canadians failed to make the playoffs that season. In the 1984 NHL entry draft, the Pittsburgh Penguins chose Belanger with their third pick of the first round, the 16th choice overall, following their selections of Mario Lemieux (1st overall) and Doug Bodger (8th).

Belanger stepped right into the rebuilding Penguins' lineup in the 1984–85 season, and had eight points (three goals and five assists) in 44 games. The Penguins sent him back to the OHL, where his rights were traded to the Hamilton Steelhawks and in three regular season games in Hamilton, Belanger had six points (3 goals, 3 assists). Belanger helped the Steelhawks in the playoffs with 13 points, including three goals, in 17 games.

In 1985–86, Belanger failed to crack the Penguins' lineup and found himself with the Baltimore Skipjacks of the AHL, as he recorded 17 goals and 38 points in 69 games in what proved to be the last injury-free season of his career. The following year Belanger played in 32 games with Baltimore, getting 20 points (nine goals and 11 assists), then spent time with the Muskegon Lumberjacks of the IHL, where he had a goal and two assists in five games. In 1987–88, Belanger was beset with numerous injuries and played in just five games with the Lumberjacks, getting a goal and three assists, then played two games with the New Haven Nighthawks of the AHL, where he went scoreless.

That proved to be the end of Belanger's playing career, as he retired from hockey in 1988 due to injuries.

== Death ==
Belanger died September 16, 2011, from a heart attack at his home in Welland, Ontario, age 45.

== Career statistics ==
=== Regular season and playoffs ===
			Regular season					Playoffs
Season	Team	League	GP	G	A	Pts	PIM	GP	G	A	Pts	PIM
1981–82	Welland Maple Leafs AAA	Midget	25	20	21	41	—	—	—	—	—	—
1982–83	London Knights	OHL	68	17	14	31	53	1	0	0	0	5
1983–84	Kingston Canadians	OHL	67	44	46	90	66	—	—	—	—	—
1984–85	Hamilton Steelhawks	OHL	3	3	3	6	0	17	3	10	13	47
1984–85	Pittsburgh Penguins	NHL	44	3	5	8	32	—	—	—	—	—
1985–86	Baltimore Skipjacks	AHL	69	17	21	38	61	—	—	—	—	—
1986–87	Baltimore Skipjacks	AHL	32	9	11	20	14	—	—	—	—	—
1986–87	Muskegon Lumberjacks	IHL	5	1	2	3	0	—	—	—	—	—
1987–88	Muskegon Lumberjacks	IHL	5	1	3	4	6	—	—	—	—	—
1987–88	New Haven Nighthawks	AHL	2	0	0	0	0	—	—	—	—	—
AHL totals			103	26	32	58	75	—	—	—	—	—
NHL totals			44	3	5	8	32	—	—	—	—	—

Awards and achievements
Preceded by Doug Bodger	Pittsburgh Penguins first-round draft pick 1984	Succeeded by Craig Simpson
