= Marc Laforge =

Canadian ice hockey player

- Born: January 3, 1968 (age 58) Sudbury, Ontario, Canada
- Height: 6 ft 3 in (191 cm)
- Weight: 215 lb (98 kg; 15 st 5 lb)
- Position: Defence
- Shot: Left
- Played for: Hartford Whalers; Edmonton Oilers
- NHL draft: 32nd overall, 1986; Hartford Whalers
- Playing career: 1987–2001

Marc Laforge (born January 3, 1968) is a Canadian former professional ice hockey defenceman. He was drafted in the second round, 32nd overall, by the Hartford Whalers in the 1986 NHL entry draft. He played nine games with the Whalers in the 1989–90 season before they traded him to the Edmonton Oilers in exchange for Cam Brauer on March 6, 1990. He would eventually play five games with the Oilers during the 1993–94 season.

After playing three seasons in the Ontario Hockey League with the Kingston Canadians, the enforcer Laforge joined the Sudbury Wolves for the 1987–88 OHL season. Fourteen games into the season, Laforge was involved in a postgame brawl with the Guelph Platers. Laforge attacked eight different Platers while they were involved in other fights, and he was also accused of driving Plater goaltender Andy Helmuth's head into the ice. Laforge was given a two-year suspension from the league (the equivalent of a lifetime ban for a 19-year-old in a league with an age limit of 21) for his actions, ending his career as a junior player. Laforge later referred to the incident as "the dumbest thing I've ever done."

Laforge amassed over 3,000 penalty minutes in his professional hockey career. As a junior player, he set the Kingston Canadians all-time record for career penalty minutes with 686. In his fourteen-game NHL career, he scored no points and spent 64 minutes in the penalty box. In addition, he holds the Manitoba Moose record for penalty minutes in a single period, tallying 37 in the first period of a 1997 game against the Long Beach Ice Dogs.

== Career statistics ==
			Regular season					Playoffs
Season	Team	League	GP	G	A	Pts	PIM	GP	G	A	Pts	PIM
1984–85	Kingston Canadians	OHL	57	1	5	6	214	—	—	—	—	—
1985–86	Kingston Canadians	OHL	60	1	13	14	248	10	0	1	1	30
1986–87	Kingston Canadians	OHL	53	2	10	12	224	12	1	0	1	79
1986–87	Binghamton Whalers	AHL	—	—	—	—	—	4	0	0	0	7
1987–88	Sudbury Wolves	OHL	14	0	2	2	68	—	—	—	—	—
1988–89	Indianapolis Ice	IHL	14	0	2	2	138	—	—	—	—	—
1988–89	Binghamton Whalers	AHL	38	2	2	4	179	—	—	—	—	—
1989–90	Binghamton Whalers	AHL	25	2	6	8	111	—	—	—	—	—
1989–90	Cape Breton Oilers	AHL	3	0	1	1	24	3	0	0	0	27
1989–90	Hartford Whalers	NHL	9	0	0	0	43	—	—	—	—	—
1990–91	Cape Breton Oilers	AHL	49	1	7	8	217	—	—	—	—	—
1991–92	Cape Breton Oilers	AHL	59	0	14	14	341	4	0	0	0	24
1992–93	Cape Breton Oilers	AHL	77	1	12	13	208	15	1	2	3	78
1993–94	Salt Lake Golden Eagles	IHL	43	0	2	2	242	—	—	—	—	—
1993–94	Cape Breton Oilers	AHL	14	0	0	0	91	—	—	—	—	—
1993–94	Edmonton Oilers	NHL	5	0	0	0	21	—	—	—	—	—
1994–95	Cape Breton Oilers	AHL	18	0	1	1	80	—	—	—	—	—
1994–95	Syracuse Crunch	AHL	39	1	5	6	202	—	—	—	—	—
1995–96	Minnesota Moose	IHL	20	0	2	2	102	—	—	—	—	—
1996–97	San Antonio Dragons	IHL	67	1	7	8	311	7	0	0	0	26
1997–98	Anchorage Aces	WCHL	27	1	10	11	124	8	1	2	3	14
1997–98	Manitoba Moose	IHL	7	0	0	0	4	—	—	—	—	—
1998–99	San Antonio Iguanas	CHL	58	0	8	8	302	7	0	0	0	43
1999–00	San Antonio Iguanas	CHL	61	2	15	17	243	—	—	—	—	—
2000–01	San Diego Gulls	WCHL	4	0	1	1	12	—	—	—	—	—
2000–01	Bakersfield Condors	WCHL	2	0	1	1	27	—	—	—	—	—
2000–01	Indianapolis Ice	CHL	49	1	5	6	175	—	—	—	—	—
NHL totals			14	0	0	0	64	—	—	—	—	—
AHL totals			322	7	48	55	1,453	26	1	2	3	136
IHL totals			151	1	13	14	797	7	0	0	0	26
