= Moe Robinson =

Canadian ice hockey player

- Born: May 29, 1957 (age 67); Winchester, Ontario, Canada
- Height: 6 ft 4 in (193 cm)
- Weight: 175 lb (79 kg; 12 st 7 lb)
- Position: Defence
- Shot: Left
- Played for: Montreal Canadiens
- NHL draft: 49th overall, 1977; Montreal Canadiens
- WHA draft: 15th overall, 1977; New England Whalers
- Playing career: 1977–1981

Morris Leslie Robinson (born May 29, 1957) is a Canadian former professional ice hockey defenceman. He played one game in the National Hockey League with the Montreal Canadiens during the 1979–80 season. The rest of his career, which lasted from 1977 to 1981, was spent in the minor leagues. His brother Larry also played in the NHL with the Canadiens, and is in the Hockey Hall of Fame.

== Playing career ==
Although his Hall of Fame brother Larry Robinson was with the Canadiens at that time, they did not play together as the older Robinson was out injured during Moe's brief recall from the AHL made to replace Larry on the roster. Moe Robinson's one NHL game came in Winnipeg on December 15, 1979, as he played six shifts in a 6-2 road loss in the Canadiens' first game with the Winnipeg Jets which had recently come from the disbanded WHA. The only time that the Robinson brothers were paired together on the blueline with the Canadiens was in a 1979 exhibition game against the Philadelphia Flyers.

== Career statistics ==
=== Regular season and playoffs ===
			Regular season					Playoffs
Season	Team	League	GP	G	A	Pts	PIM	GP	G	A	Pts	PIM
1974–75	Gloucester Rangers	CJHL	—	—	—	—	—	—	—	—	—	—
1975–76	Gloucester Rangers	CJHL	50	10	33	43	46	—	—	—	—	—
1976–77	Kingston Canadians	OMJHL	48	5	15	20	35	—	—	—	—	—
1977–78	Nova Scotia Voyageurs	AHL	75	6	23	29	68	11	0	1	1	7
1978–79	Nova Scotia Voyageurs	AHL	78	4	23	27	92	9	1	1	2	6
1979–80	Montreal Canadiens	NHL	1	0	0	0	0	—	—	—	—	—
1979–80	Nova Scotia Voyageurs	AHL	64	5	35	40	82	6	0	2	2	4
1980–81	Oklahoma City Stars	CHL	56	4	22	26	55	3	0	2	2	0
AHL totals			217	15	81	96	242	26	1	4	5	17
NHL totals			1	0	0	0	0	—	—	—	—	—

== See also ==
- List of players who played only one game in the NHL
