= Howard Scruton =

Canadian ice hockey player

- Born: October 6, 1962 (age 62); Toronto, Ontario, Canada
- Height: 6 ft 3 in (191 cm)
- Weight: 190 lb (86 kg; 13 st 8 lb)
- Position: Defence
- Shot: Left
- Played for: Los Angeles Kings
- NHL draft: Undrafted
- Playing career: 1982–1985

Howard Scruton (born October 6, 1962) is a Canadian former professional ice hockey player who played 4 games for the Los Angeles Kings in the National Hockey League during the 1982–83 season. As a youth, he played in the 1975 Quebec International Pee-Wee Hockey Tournament with a minor ice hockey team from Toronto.

== Career statistics ==
=== Regular season and playoffs ===
			Regular season					Playoffs
Season	Team	League	GP	G	A	Pts	PIM	GP	G	A	Pts	PIM
1978–79	St. Michael's Buzzers	MetJBHL	65	4	24	28	174	—	—	—	—	—
1979–80	Niagara Falls Flyers	OMJHL	51	1	3	4	76	10	1	2	3	14
1980–81	Niagara Falls Flyers	OHL	28	5	9	14	56	—	—	—	—	—
1980–81	Kingston Canadiens	OHL	25	0	10	10	23	14	0	4	4	25
1981–82	Kingston Canadiens	OHL	56	6	29	35	80	—	—	—	—	—
1981–82	New Haven Nighthawks	AHL	1	1	0	1	0	2	0	0	0	0
1982–83	Los Angeles Kings	NHL	4	0	4	4	9	—	—	—	—	—
1982–83	New Haven Nighthawks	AHL	74	6	7	13	40	12	0	1	1	12
1983–84	New Haven Nighthawks	AHL	33	1	4	5	21	—	—	—	—	—
1984–85	New Haven Nighthawks	AHL	74	1	6	7	31	—	—	—	—	—
AHL totals			182	9	17	26	92	14	0	1	1	12
NHL totals			4	0	4	4	9	—	—	—	—	—
