= Steve Seguin =

Canadian ice hockey player

- Born: April 10, 1964 (age 60); Cornwall, Ontario, Canada
- Height: 6 ft 2 in (188 cm)
- Weight: 201 lb (91 kg; 14 st 5 lb)
- Position: Winger
- Shot: Left
- Played for: Los Angeles Kings
- NHL draft: 48th overall, 1982; Los Angeles Kings
- Playing career: 1984–1988

Steven Joseph Seguin (born April 10, 1964) is a Canadian former professional ice hockey player. He played in 5 National Hockey League games with the Los Angeles Kings during the 1984–85 season. As a youth, he played in the 1977 Quebec International Pee-Wee Hockey Tournament with a minor ice hockey team from Cornwall.

== Career statistics ==
=== Regular season and playoffs ===
			Regular season					Playoffs
Season	Team	League	GP	G	A	Pts	PIM	GP	G	A	Pts	PIM
1980–81	Kingston Canadians	OHL	49	8	8	16	18	—	—	—	—	—
1981–82	Kingston Canadians	OHL	62	23	31	54	75	4	0	2	2	4
1982–83	Kingston Canadians	OHL	19	8	17	25	42	—	—	—	—	—
1982–83	Peterborough Petes	OHL	44	16	30	46	22	4	0	1	1	2
1983–84	Peterborough Petes	OHL	67	55	51	106	84	8	8	8	16	11
1984–85	Los Angeles Kings	NHL	5	0	0	0	0	—	—	—	—	—
1984–85	New Haven Nighthawks	AHL	58	18	7	25	39	—	—	—	—	—
1985–86	New Haven Nighthawks	AHL	2	0	0	0	0	—	—	—	—	—
1985–86	Hershey Bears	AHL	75	25	29	54	91	15	2	0	2	22
1987–88	Hershey Bears	AHL	1	0	0	0	0	—	—	—	—	—
1987–88	Baltimore Skipjacks	AHL	45	17	18	35	63	—	—	—	—	—
AHL totals			181	60	54	114	193	15	2	0	2	23
NHL totals			5	0	0	0	9	—	—	—	—	—
