= Peter Dineen =

- Born: November 19, 1960 (age 65) Kingston, Ontario, Canada
- Height: 5 ft 11 in (180 cm)
- Weight: 181 lb (82 kg; 12 st 13 lb)
- Position: Defence
- Shot: Right
- Played for: Los Angeles Kings; Detroit Red Wings
- NHL draft: 189th overall, 1980; Philadelphia Flyers
- Playing career: 1980–1991

Peter Kevin Dineen (born November 19, 1960) is a Canadian former professional ice hockey defenceman who played 13 games in the National Hockey League (NHL) for the Los Angeles Kings and Detroit Red Wings between 1986 and 1989. The rest of his career, which lasted from 1980 to 1991, was spent in the American Hockey League. He is the second oldest of the Dineen brothers (Kevin and Gord), and son of Bill Dineen who all also played in the NHL. He has been a professional hockey scout for the Minnesota North Stars, Philadelphia Flyers, Florida Panthers, Boston Bruins, and the Columbus Blue Jackets. In 2018, he was hired as an assistant coach for the Adirondack Thunder in the ECHL.

== Playing career ==
Dineen was drafted in the ninth round of the 1980 NHL entry draft by the Philadelphia Flyers after playing two seasons in the Ontario Major Junior Hockey League with the Kingston Canadians. He would go on to a brief NHL career, playing in 13 games for the Los Angeles Kings and Detroit Red Wings. He earned two assists in those 13 games.

== Career statistics ==
=== Regular season and playoffs ===
			Regular season					Playoffs
Season	Team	League	GP	G	A	Pts	PIM	GP	G	A	Pts	PIM
1977–78	Kamloops Chiefs	BCHL	56	13	31	44	160	—	—	—	—	—
1977–78	Seattle Breakers	WCHL	2	0	0	0	0	—	—	—	—	—
1978–79	Kingston Canadians	OMJHL	60	7	14	21	70	11	2	6	8	29
1979–80	Kingston Canadians	OMJHL	32	4	10	14	54	3	0	0	0	13
1980–81	Maine Mariners	AHL	41	6	7	13	100	16	1	2	3	82
1981–82	Maine Mariners	AHL	71	6	14	20	156	3	0	0	0	2
1982–83	Maine Mariners	AHL	2	0	0	0	0	—	—	—	—	—
1982–83	Moncton Alpines	AHL	59	0	10	10	76	—	—	—	—	—
1983–84	Moncton Alpines	AHL	63	0	10	10	120	—	—	—	—	—
1983–84	Hershey Bears	AHL	12	0	1	1	32	—	—	—	—	—
1984–85	Hershey Bears	AHL	79	4	19	23	144	—	—	—	—	—
1985–86	Binghamton Whalers	AHL	11	0	11	11	35	—	—	—	—	—
1985–86	Moncton Golden Flames	AHL	55	5	13	18	136	9	1	0	1	9
1986–87	Los Angeles Kings	NHL	11	0	2	2	8	—	—	—	—	—
1986–87	New Haven Nighthawks	AHL	59	2	17	19	140	7	0	1	1	27
1987–88	Adirondack Red Wings	AHL	76	8	26	34	137	11	0	2	2	20
1988–89	Adirondack Red Wings	AHL	32	2	12	14	61	17	2	5	7	22
1989–90	Detroit Red Wings	NHL	2	0	0	0	5	—	—	—	—	—
1989–90	Adirondack Red Wings	AHL	27	3	6	9	28	6	0	1	1	10
1990–91	San Diego Gulls	IHL	24	0	1	1	17	—	—	—	—	—
AHL totals			587	36	136	172	1165	69	4	11	15	172
NHL totals			13	0	2	2	13	—	—	—	—	—
