= Mike Forbes =

Canadian ice hockey player, executive (born 1957)

- Born: September 20, 1957 (age 67); Brampton, Ontario, Canada
- Height: 6 ft 2 in (188 cm)
- Weight: 208 lb (94 kg; 14 st 12 lb)
- Position: Defence
- Shot: Right
- Played for: Boston Bruins; Edmonton Oilers
- NHL draft: 52nd overall, 1977; Boston Bruins
- Playing career: 1977–1987

Michael D. Forbes (born September 20, 1957) is a Canadian former professional ice hockey defenceman, manager and commissioner. Forbes was selected in the third round of the 1977 NHL Amateur Draft by the Boston Bruins, 52nd overall. He played 50 games in the NHL between 1977 and 1982 with the Bruins and Edmonton Oilers. The rest of his career, which lasted from 1977 to 1987, was spent in different minor leagues.

== Playing career ==
Forbes spent his junior career with the Kingston Canadians and St. Catharines Fincups of the OMJHL, and won a silver medal with Canada at the 1977 World Junior Championships. Following his draft, Forbes split the 1977–78 season between Boston and their AHL-affiliate, the Rochester Americans. Forbes played in Rochester for the 1978–79 season, and was claimed by the Edmonton Oilers in the 1979 NHL Expansion Draft.

Forbes would play in only 18 games for Edmonton over the rest of his career, but was productive in the CHL, first with the Houston Apollos and later with the Wichita Wind and Montana Magic, highlighted by being named to the 1983 CHL All-Star Team. Forbes spent parts of two seasons with the Muskegon Lumberjacks of the IHL at the tail end of his career, (including on the 1986 Turner Cup team), before retiring in 1987.

== Post-retirement ==
Forbes was assistant general manager and co owner of the Muskegon Lumberjacks and remained with the Cleveland Lumberjacks as assistant general manager and co owner until 1992, and was named GM of the Salt Lake Golden Eagles on May 25, 1993, a position he held for the 1993–94 season. In 1994 Forbes was made commissioner of the Colonial Hockey League, a position he held until 1997. He currently resides in Grand Haven, MI and is the Head Coach of the ACHA 2011 National Champion Division II hockey team at Grand Valley State University. Forbes was also named the 2011 ACHA D2 Coach of the Year, as well as being appointed to the Coaching staff of the 2012 ACHA D2 Select Team.

== Career statistics ==
=== Regular season and playoffs ===
			Regular season					Playoffs
Season	Team	League	GP	G	A	Pts	PIM	GP	G	A	Pts	PIM
1973–74	Georgetown Raiders	MJBHL	—	—	—	—	—	—	—	—	—	—
1973–74	Bramalea Blues	MJBHL	—	—	—	—	—	—	—	—	—	—
1974–75	Kingston Canadiens	OMJHL	64	0	10	10	98	8	1	1	2	14
1975–76	Kingston Canadiens	OMJHL	48	4	13	17	117	5	0	0	0	5
1976–77	St. Catharines Fincups	OMJHL	61	12	41	53	134	14	1	5	6	41
1977–78	Boston Bruins	NHL	32	0	4	4	15	—	—	—	—	—
1977–78	Rochester Americans	AHL	32	3	12	15	65	6	0	1	1	22
1978–79	Rochester Americans	AHL	75	4	20	24	97	—	—	—	—	—
1979–80	Edmonton Oilers	NHL	2	0	0	0	0	—	—	—	—	—
1979–80	Houston Apollos	CHL	55	5	30	35	63	—	—	—	—	—
1980–81	Wichita Wind	CHL	79	4	44	48	129	15	1	16	17	46
1981–82	Edmonton Oilers	NHL	16	1	7	8	26	—	—	—	—	—
1981–82	Wichita Wind	CHL	49	4	28	32	94	6	0	2	2	4
1982–83	Wichita Wind	CHL	75	15	46	61	73	—	—	—	—	—
1983–84	Montana Magic	CHL	76	13	38	51	83	—	—	—	—	—
1985–86	Muskegon Lumberjacks	IHL	14	1	7	8	13	13	0	2	2	19
1986–87	Muskegon Lumberjacks	IHL	67	3	22	25	113	15	1	10	11	4
CHL totals			334	41	186	227	442	21	1	18	19	50
NHL totals			50	1	11	12	41	—	—	—	—	—

=== International ===
Year	Team	Event	GP	G	A	Pts	PIM
1977	Canada	WJC	7	0	1	1	22
Junior totals			7	0	1	1	22
