= Rod Graham =

Canadian ice hockey player

- Born: August 19, 1946 (age 78); London, Ontario, Canada
- Height: 6 ft 0 in (183 cm)
- Weight: 185 lb (84 kg; 13 st 3 lb)
- Position: Left wing
- Shot: Left
- Played for: Boston Bruins
- Playing career: 1967–1978

Rodney Douglas Graham (born August 19, 1946) is a Canadian former professional ice hockey player who played 14 games in the National Hockey League with the Boston Bruins during the 1974–75 season. The rest of his career, which lasted from 1967 to 1978, was spent in the minor leagues.

== Career statistics ==
=== Regular season and playoffs ===
			Regular season					Playoffs
Season	Team	League	GP	G	A	Pts	PIM	GP	G	A	Pts	PIM
1967–68	Kingston Aces	OHA Sr	37	15	23	38	46	—	—	—	—	—
1967–68	Oklahoma City Blazers	CHL	—	—	—	—	—	4	0	2	2	2
1968–69	Kingston Aces	OHA Sr	39	26	32	58	94	—	—	—	—	—
1969–70	Kingston Aces	OHA Sr	32	11	14	25	81	—	—	—	—	—
1970–71	Kingston Aces	OHA Sr	32	24	19	43	65	—	—	—	—	—
1971–72	Woodstock Royals	OHA Sr	39	6	20	26	28	—	—	—	—	—
1972–73	Rochester Americans	AHL	70	16	22	38	83	6	2	1	3	5
1973–74	Rochester Americans	NHL	74	10	41	51	88	5	2	1	3	5
1974–75	Boston Bruins	NHL	14	2	1	3	7	—	—	—	—	—
1974–75	Rochester Americans	AHL	57	12	22	34	97	11	1	2	3	20
1975–76	Springfield Indians	AHL	70	20	35	55	74	—	—	—	—	—
1976–77	Rochester Americans	AHL	70	5	22	27	77	12	1	4	5	6
1977–78	Rochester Americans	AHL	73	7	12	19	39	6	0	2	2	9
AHL totals			414	70	154	224	458	40	6	10	16	45
NHL totals			14	2	1	3	7	—	—	—	—	—
