= 1985–86 OHL season =

Ontario Hockey League season

The 1985–86 OHL season was the sixth season of the Ontario Hockey League. Fifteen teams each played 66 games. The Guelph Platers won the J. Ross Robertson Cup, defeating the Belleville Bulls.

== New arena ==
=== Copps Coliseum (Hamilton) ===
The Hamilton Steelhawks moved from the Mountain Arena to Copps Coliseum early in the season.

== Regular season ==
=== Final standings ===
Note: GP = Games played; W = Wins; L = Losses; T = Ties; GF = Goals for; GA = Goals against; PTS = Points; x = clinched playoff berth; y = clinched division title

=== Leyden Division ===
| Rank | Team | GP | W | L | T | PTS | GF | GA |
|---|---|---|---|---|---|---|---|---|
| 1 | y-Peterborough Petes | 66 | 45 | 19 | 2 | 92 | 298 | 190 |
| 2 | x-Belleville Bulls | 66 | 37 | 27 | 2 | 76 | 305 | 268 |
| 3 | x-Oshawa Generals | 66 | 37 | 27 | 2 | 76 | 285 | 257 |
| 4 | x-Kingston Canadians | 66 | 35 | 28 | 3 | 73 | 297 | 257 |
| 5 | x-Cornwall Royals | 66 | 28 | 36 | 2 | 58 | 307 | 356 |
| 6 | x-Toronto Marlboros | 66 | 22 | 41 | 3 | 47 | 297 | 345 |
| 7 | Ottawa 67's | 66 | 18 | 46 | 2 | 38 | 274 | 352 |

=== Emms Division ===
| Rank | Team | GP | W | L | T | PTS | GF | GA |
|---|---|---|---|---|---|---|---|---|
| 1 | y-North Bay Centennials | 66 | 41 | 21 | 4 | 86 | 330 | 240 |
| 2 | x-Guelph Platers | 66 | 41 | 23 | 2 | 84 | 297 | 235 |
| 3 | x-Windsor Compuware Spitfires | 66 | 34 | 26 | 6 | 74 | 280 | 259 |
| 4 | x-Kitchener Rangers | 66 | 35 | 27 | 4 | 74 | 318 | 309 |
| 5 | x-Sudbury Wolves | 66 | 29 | 33 | 4 | 62 | 293 | 330 |
| 6 | x-London Knights | 66 | 28 | 33 | 5 | 61 | 271 | 292 |
| 7 | Hamilton Steelhawks | 66 | 26 | 36 | 4 | 56 | 268 | 306 |
| 8 | Sault Ste. Marie Greyhounds | 66 | 15 | 48 | 3 | 33 | 263 | 387 |

=== Scoring leaders ===
| Player | Team | GP | G | A | Pts | PIM |
|---|---|---|---|---|---|---|
| Ray Sheppard | Cornwall Royals | 63 | 81 | 61 | 142 | 25 |
| Scott McCrory | Oshawa Generals | 66 | 52 | 80 | 132 | 40 |
| Jason Lafreniere | Hamilton Steelhawks/Belleville Bulls | 60 | 49 | 83 | 132 | 4 |
| Ron Sanko | North Bay Centennials/Kitchener Rangers | 67 | 43 | 89 | 132 | 138 |
| Shawn Burr | Kitchener Rangers | 59 | 60 | 67 | 127 | 83 |
| Jack MacKeigan | Toronto Marlboros | 66 | 53 | 59 | 112 | 64 |
| Craig Duncanson | Sudbury Wolves/Cornwall Royals | 61 | 43 | 67 | 110 | 190 |
| Gary McColgan | Oshawa Generals | 57 | 49 | 55 | 104 | 22 |
| Mike Stapleton | Cornwall Royals | 56 | 39 | 65 | 104 | 74 |
| Tim Armstrong | Toronto Marlboros | 64 | 35 | 69 | 104 | 36 |

== Playoffs ==
Division quarter-finals
L1 | Peterborough | 8
L6 | Toronto | 0
L2 | Belleville | 9
L5 | Cornwall | 3
L3 | Oshawa | 4
L4 | Kingston | 8
E1 | North Bay | 9
E6 | London | 1
E3 | Windsor | 8
E4 | Kitchener | 2
E2 | Guelph | 8
E5 | Sudbury | 0

Division semi-finals
L1 | Peterborough | 6
L2 | Belleville | 4
L4 | Kingston | 2
E1 | North Bay | 2
E3 | Windsor | 4
E2 | Guelph | 8

Division finals
L1 | Peterborough | 7
L2 | Belleville | 9
E2 | Guelph | 8
E3 | Windsor | 4

J. Ross Robertson Cup
L2 | Belleville | 4
E2 | Guelph | 8

=== Division quarter-finals ===
==== Leyden Division ====
===== (1) Peterborough Petes vs. (6) Toronto Marlboros =====
| March 23 | Toronto Marlboros | 2 – 7 | Peterborough Petes | Peterborough Memorial Centre |

| March 25 | Peterborough Petes | 3 – 1 | Toronto Marlboros | Maple Leaf Gardens |

| March 27 | Toronto Marlboros | 2 – 10 | Peterborough Petes | Peterborough Memorial Centre |

| March 28 | Peterborough Petes | 4 – 1 | Toronto Marlboros | Maple Leaf Gardens |

| Peterborough wins series 8 – 0 |

===== (2) Belleville Bulls vs. (5) Cornwall Royals =====
| March 23 | Cornwall Royals | 5 – 3 | Belleville Bulls | Yardmen Arena |

| March 24 | Belleville Bulls | 4 – 4 | Cornwall Royals | Cornwall Civic Complex |

| March 26 | Cornwall Royals | 4 – 5 | Belleville Bulls | Yardmen Arena |

| March 27 | Belleville Bulls | 7 – 2 | Cornwall Royals | Cornwall Civic Complex |

| March 29 | Cornwall Royals | 5 – 9 | Belleville Bulls | Yardmen Arena |

| March 30 | Belleville Bulls | 8 – 6 | Cornwall Royals | Cornwall Civic Complex |

| Belleville wins series 9 – 3 |

===== (3) Oshawa Generals vs. (4) Kingston Canadians =====
| March 23 | Kingston Canadians | 4 – 6 | Oshawa Generals | Oshawa Civic Auditorium |

| March 25 | Oshawa Generals | 0 – 6 | Kingston Canadians | Kingston Memorial Centre |

| March 27 | Kingston Canadians | 9 – 6 | Oshawa Generals | Oshawa Civic Auditorium |

| March 28 | Oshawa Generals | 7 – 2 | Kingston Canadians | Kingston Memorial Centre |

| March 30 | Kingston Canadians | 5 – 3 | Oshawa Generals | Oshawa Civic Auditorium |

| April 1 | Oshawa Generals | 3 – 5 | Kingston Canadians | Kingston Memorial Centre |

| Kingston wins series 8 – 4 |

==== Emms Division ====
===== (1) North Bay Centennials vs. (6) London Knights =====
| March 23 | London Knights | 4 – 5 | North Bay Centennials | North Bay Memorial Gardens |

| March 25 | North Bay Centennials | 4 – 4 | London Knights | London Gardens |

| March 27 | London Knights | 2 – 5 | North Bay Centennials | North Bay Memorial Gardens |

| March 28 | North Bay Centennials | 6 – 3 | London Knights | London Gardens |

| March 30 | London Knights | 3 – 5 | North Bay Centennials | North Bay Memorial Gardens |

| North Bay wins series 9 – 1 |

===== (2) Guelph Platers vs. (5) Sudbury Wolves =====
| March 23 | Sudbury Wolves | 3 – 5 | Guelph Platers | Guelph Memorial Gardens |

| March 25 | Guelph Platers | 6 – 5 | Sudbury Wolves | Sudbury Community Arena |

| March 27 | Sudbury Wolves | 1 – 8 | Guelph Platers | Guelph Memorial Gardens |

| March 28 | Guelph Platers | 6 – 3 | Sudbury Wolves | Sudbury Community Arena |

| Guelph wins series 8 – 0 |

===== (3) Windsor Compuware Spitfires vs. (4) Kitchener Rangers =====
| March 23 | Kitchener Rangers | 4 – 5 | Windsor Compuware Spitfires | Windsor Arena |

| March 25 | Windsor Compuware Spitfires | 5 – 4 | Kitchener Rangers | Kitchener Memorial Auditorium |

| March 27 | Kitchener Rangers | 2 – 5 | Windsor Compuware Spitfires | Windsor Arena |

| March 28 | Windsor Compuware Spitfires | 0 – 7 | Kitchener Rangers | Kitchener Memorial Auditorium |

| March 30 | Kitchener Rangers | 6 – 7 | Windsor Compuware Spitfires | Windsor Arena |

| Windsor wins series 8 – 2 |

=== Division semi-finals ===
==== Leyden Division ====
===== Round-Robin =====
| Rank | Team | GP | W | L | PTS | GF | GA |
|---|---|---|---|---|---|---|---|
| 1 | x-Peterborough Petes | 4 | 3 | 1 | 6 | 15 | 12 |
| 2 | x-Belleville Bulls | 4 | 2 | 2 | 4 | 14 | 19 |
| 3 | Kingston Canadians | 4 | 1 | 3 | 2 | 15 | 13 |

| April 4 | Belleville Bulls | 1 – 7 | Kingston Canadians | Kingston Memorial Centre |

| April 5 | Peterborough Petes | 4 – 5 | OT | Belleville Bulls | Yardmen Arena |

| April 6 | Peterborough Petes | 3 – 1 | Kingston Canadians | Kingston Memorial Centre |

| April 8 | Belleville Bulls | 3 – 4 | OT | Peterborough Petes | Peterborough Memorial Centre |

| April 9 | Kingston Canadians | 4 – 5 | OT | Belleville Bulls | Yardmen Arena |

| April 10 | Kingston Canadians | 3 – 4 | OT | Peterborough Petes | Peterborough Memorial Centre |

==== Emms Division ====
===== Round-Robin =====
| Rank | Team | GP | W | L | PTS | GF | GA |
|---|---|---|---|---|---|---|---|
| 1 | x-Guelph Platers | 4 | 4 | 0 | 8 | 25 | 8 |
| 2 | x-Windsor Compuware Spitfires | 5 | 2 | 3 | 4 | 16 | 23 |
| 3 | North Bay Centennials | 5 | 1 | 4 | 2 | 13 | 23 |

| April 2 | Guelph Platers | 7 – 2 | Windsor Compuware Spitfires | Windsor Arena |

| April 4 | North Bay Centennials | 2 – 5 | Guelph Platers | Guelph Memorial Gardens |

| April 6 | Windsor Compuware Spitfires | 2 – 5 | North Bay Centennials | North Bay Memorial Gardens |

| April 8 | Guelph Platers | 6 – 2 | North Bay Centennials | North Bay Memorial Gardens |

| April 10 | North Bay Centennials | 2 – 5 | Windsor Compuware Spitfires | Windsor Arena |

| April 11 | Windsor Compuware Spitfires | 2 – 7 | Guelph Platers | Guelph Memorial Gardens |

| April 12 | Windsor Compuware Spitfires | 5 – 2 | North Bay Centennials | North Bay Memorial Gardens |

=== Division finals ===
==== Leyden Division ====
===== (1) Peterborough Petes vs. (2) Belleville Bulls =====
| April 13 | Belleville Bulls | 7 – 2 | Peterborough Petes | Peterborough Memorial Centre |

| April 15 | Peterborough Petes | 3 – 5 | Belleville Bulls | Yardmen Arena |

| April 17 | Belleville Bulls | 1 – 4 | Peterborough Petes | Peterborough Memorial Centre |

| April 19 | Peterborough Petes | 3 – 2 | Belleville Bulls | Yardmen Arena |

| April 21 | Belleville Bulls | 2 – 1 | Peterborough Petes | Peterborough Memorial Centre |

| April 23 | Peterborough Petes | 4 – 4 | Belleville Bulls | Yardmen Arena |

| April 24 | Belleville Bulls | 1 – 5 | Peterborough Petes | Peterborough Memorial Centre |

| April 25 | Peterborough Petes | 2 – 5 | Belleville Bulls | Yardmen Arena |

| Belleville wins series 9 – 7 |

==== Emms Division ====
===== (2) Guelph Platers vs. (3) Windsor Compuware Spitfires =====
| April 14 | Windsor Compuware Spitfires | 2 – 7 | Guelph Platers | Guelph Memorial Gardens |

| April 16 | Guelph Platers | 3 – 8 | Windsor Compuware Spitfires | Windsor Arena |

| April 18 | Windsor Compuware Spitfires | 5 – 4 | Guelph Platers | Guelph Memorial Gardens |

| April 20 | Guelph Platers | 5 – 4 | Windsor Compuware Spitfires | Windsor Arena |

| April 22 | Windsor Compuware Spitfires | 2 – 3 | Guelph Platers | Guelph Memorial Gardens |

| April 24 | Guelph Platers | 5 – 1 | Windsor Compuware Spitfires | Windsor Arena |

| Guelph wins series 8 – 4 |

=== J. Ross Robertson Cup ===
==== (E2) Guelph Platers vs. (L2) Belleville Bulls ====
| April 27 | Belleville Bulls | 0 – 7 | Guelph Platers | Guelph Memorial Gardens |

| April 29 | Guelph Platers | 3 – 4 | Belleville Bulls | Yardmen Arena |

| April 30 | Guelph Platers | 2 – 2 | Belleville Bulls | Yardmen Arena |

| May 2 | Belleville Bulls | 4 – 5 | Guelph Platers | Guelph Memorial Gardens |

| May 3 | Guelph Platers | 6 – 6 | Belleville Bulls | Yardmen Arena |

| May 4 | Belleville Bulls | 1 – 2 | Guelph Platers | Guelph Memorial Gardens |

| Guelph wins series 8 – 4 |

== Awards ==
| J. Ross Robertson Cup: | Guelph Platers |
| Hamilton Spectator Trophy: | Peterborough Petes |
| Leyden Trophy: | Peterborough Petes |
| Emms Trophy: | North Bay Centennials |
| Red Tilson Trophy: | Ray Sheppard, Cornwall Royals |
| Eddie Powers Memorial Trophy: | Ray Sheppard, Cornwall Royals |
| Matt Leyden Trophy: | Jacques Martin, Guelph Platers |
| Jim Mahon Memorial Trophy: | Ray Sheppard, Cornwall Royals |
| Max Kaminsky Trophy: | Jeff Brown, Sudbury Wolves and Terry Carkner, Peterborough Petes |
| Jack Ferguson Award: | Troy Mallette, Sault Ste. Marie Greyhounds |
| Dave Pinkney Trophy: | Kay Whitmore and Ron Tugnutt, Peterborough Petes |
| Emms Family Award: | Lonnie Loach, Guelph Platers |
| F.W. 'Dinty' Moore Trophy: | Paul Henriques, Belleville Bulls |
| William Hanley Trophy: | Jason Lafreniere, Belleville Bulls |
| Leo Lalonde Memorial Trophy: | Steve Guenette, Guelph Platers |
| Bobby Smith Trophy: | Chris Clifford, Kingston Canadians |

== 1986 OHL Priority Selection ==
The Sault Ste. Marie Greyhounds held the first overall pick in the 1986 Ontario Priority Selection and selected Troy Mallette from the Rayside-Balfour Midgets. Mallette was awarded the Jack Ferguson Award, awarded to the top pick in the draft.

Below are the players who were selected in the first round of the 1986 Ontario Hockey League Priority Selection.

| # | Player | Nationality | OHL Team | Hometown | Minor Team |
|---|---|---|---|---|---|
| 1 | Troy Mallette (C) | Canada | Sault Ste. Marie Greyhounds | Levack, Ontario | Rayside-Balfour Midgets |
| 2 | Jeff Ballantyne (D) | Canada | Ottawa 67's | Elmira, Ontario | Owen Sound Greys |
| 3 | Brad Gratton (C) | Canada | Hamilton Steelhawks | Brantford, Ontario | Brantford B's |
| 4 | Chris Govedaris (LW) | Canada | Toronto Marlboros | Toronto, Ontario | Toronto Young Nationals |
| 5 | Rick Tabaracci (G) | Canada | Cornwall Royals | Toronto, Ontario | Markham Waxers |
| 6 | Shayne Stevenson (RW) | Canada | London Knights | Aurora, Ontario | Barrie Colts |
| 7 | Wayne Doucet (LW) | Canada | Sudbury Wolves | Mississauga, Ontario | Toronto Marlboros Midget |
| 8 | Chad Badawey (RW) | Canada | Kingston Canadians | Port Colborne, Ontario | Brockville Braves |
| 9 | Darren Rumble (D) | Canada | Kitchener Rangers | Barrie, Ontario | Barrie Colts |
| 10 | Darrin Shannon (LW) | Canada | Windsor Compuware Spitfires | Alliston, Ontario | Barrie Colts |
| 11 | Kevin Miehm (C) | Canada | Oshawa Generals | Kitchener, Ontario | Kitchener Midgets |
| 12 | Greg Bignell (D) | Canada | Belleville Bulls | Kitchener, Ontario | Kitchener Rangers B's |
| 13 | Kelly Bradley (RW) | Canada | Guelph Platers | Elmira, Ontario | Owen Sound Greys |
| 14 | Darcy Cahill (C) | Canada | North Bay Centennials | Kingston, Ontario | Kingston Midgets |
| 15 | Ross Wilson (RW) | Canada | Peterborough Petes | Val Caron, Ontario | Sudbury Midgets |

== See also ==
- List of OHA Junior A standings
- List of OHL seasons
- 1986 Memorial Cup
- 1986 NHL entry draft
- 1985 in sports
- 1986 in sports

| Preceded by 1984–85 OHL season | OHL seasons | Succeeded by 1986–87 OHL season |
