= George Burnett (ice hockey) =

Canadian ice hockey coach

- Born: March 25, 1962 (age 64) Port Perry, Ontario, Canada
- Height: 6 ft 1 in (185 cm)
- Weight: 185 lb (84 kg; 13 st 3 lb)
- Position: Centre
- Shot: Right
- Played for: London Knights; McGill Redmen
- Coached for: Edmonton Oilers
- NHL draft: Undrafted
- Playing career: 1979–1985
- Coaching career: 1989–present

George Burnett (born March 25, 1962) is the general manager of the Guelph Storm of the Ontario Hockey League. Burnett previously played in the OHL with the London Knights, and later became a two-time OHL Coach of the Year and won an OHL championship in his first tour of duty with the Guelph Storm. Burnett was head coach and general manager of the Belleville Bulls for 11 seasons, and drafted all three Subban brothers into the OHL; P. K. Subban, Malcolm Subban and Jordan Subban.

Burnett briefly coached in the National Hockey League for three seasons. He was head coach of the Edmonton Oilers for part of the 1994–95 season, and was an assistant coach for the Mighty Ducks of Anaheim for two seasons. Burnett coached in the American Hockey League for four seasons, winning one division title and one Calder Cup championship. Burnett was the head coach of Canada's U18 National team which won the gold medal at the Six Nations Cup in the Czech Republic in 2001, and another gold medal at the 2010 Ivan Hlinka Memorial Tournament. Burnett was assistant coach for the Canada's U20 National Junior team at the 2011 World Junior Ice Hockey Championships and the 2012 World Junior Ice Hockey Championships winning silver and bronze medals.

== Playing career ==
=== London Knights (1979–1982) ===
Burnett began playing junior hockey with the London Knights of the OMJHL in the 1979–80 season. In 68 games he scored 14 goals and 29 points. Burnett saw his offensive numbers explode in the 1980–81 season, as he scored 17 goals and 76 points in 67 games to finish fourth in team scoring. In Burnett's third season in 1981–82, he scored 26 goals and 92 points, which was the third highest point total on the Knights. In four playoff games, Burnett scored a goal and two points. In 203 career games with the Knights, Burnett scored 57 goals and 140 assists for 197 points.

=== McGill Redmen (1982–1985) ===
Following his junior career, Burnett joined the McGill Redmen of the QUAA where he was recruited and coached by head coach Ken Tyler. In the 1982–83 season he played 38 games scoring 21 goals and 81 points, capturing the Friends of McGill Hockey Trophy as the team's rookie of the year, and winning the CIAU scoring title, and being named an All-conference and All-Canadian selection. In 43 games with McGill in 1983–84, Burnett had 22 goals and 59 points. He appeared in three games with the Redmen in 1984–85, scoring two goals and six points. While at McGill, Burnett was a teammate of future NHL coach Mike Babcock. Burnett graduated from McGill University with a physical education degree in 1985.

== Playing statistics ==
			Regular season					Playoffs
Season	Team	League	GP	G	A	Pts	PIM	GP	G	A	Pts	PIM
1976–77	Newmarket Flyers	OPJHL	—	—	—	—	—	—	—	—	—	—
1979–80	London Knights	OMJHL	68	14	15	29	21	—	—	—	—	—
1980–81	London Knights	OHL	67	17	59	76	10	—	—	—	—	—
1981–82	London Knights	OHL	68	26	66	92	63	4	1	1	2	2
1982–83	McGill Redmen	QUAA	38	21	60	81	29	—	—	—	—	—
1983–84	McGill Redmen	QUAA	43	22	37	59	20	—	—	—	—	—
1984–85	McGill Redmen	QUAA	3	2	4	6	0	—	—	—	—	—
OHL/OMJHL totals			203	57	140	197	94	4	1	1	2	2
QUAA totals			84	45	101	14	49	—	—	—	—	—

== Coaching career ==
=== Early career (1985–1989) ===
While in his third year at McGill, Burnett volunteered to coach at Selwyn House School, a private school in the Westmount area of Montreal.

After graduating McGill, he returned home to Port Perry to be an assistant coach for the nearby Uxbridge Bruins of the Central Ontario Junior C Hockey League for the 1985–86 season.

For the 1986–87 season, Burnett became head coach of his hometown Port Perry Mojacks in the Central Ontario Junior C Hockey League. Despite finishing fourth place in the 1987–88, the Mojacks won the league playoffs in only Burnett's second season. The Mojacks made it to the Provincial Final of the Clarence Schmalz Cup, but lost to the Great Lakes Junior C Hockey League's Mooretown Flags 4 games to 1.

For the 1988–89 season, Burnett became head coach of Seneca College of the OCAA.

=== Oshawa Generals (1989–1990) ===
Burnett began his OHL coaching career as an assistant coach for the Oshawa Generals in the 1989–90 OHL season, under head coach Rick Cornacchia. Twenty games into the season, Burnett was offered the positions of head coach and general manager of the struggling Niagara Falls Thunder. Despite the strength of the Oshawa squad, the offer was too good to pass up. The Generals would go on to win the OHL championship and the 1990 Memorial Cup with the likes of Eric Lindros.

=== Niagara Falls Thunder (1989–1992) ===
Twenty games into the season, Niagara Falls Thunder owner Rick Gay fired head coach Bill LaForge and assistant coaches Benny Rogano, and Heavy Evason. Rick Gay was a businessman from Oshawa, Ontario, and used his connection as a former director on the Oshawa Generals to work out a deal with owner John Humphreys to hire Burnett as head coach and general manager. Randy Hall became an assistant coach to Burnett for the remainder of the season. Hall left to become head coach of the Kingston Frontenacs for 1990–91, but returned to Niagara Falls for the 1991–92 season. Niagara Falls native Chris Johnstone was Burnett's assistant coach for the 1990–91 season. In Burnett's three seasons with Niagara Falls, he coached 178 games in the regular season and earned 97 wins. Burnett's teams reached the third round of the playoffs each season, earning 26 postseason victories.

==== 1989–1990 ====
Burnett took over the Niagara Falls Thunder after they began the 1989–90 OHL season with only 4 wins and 2 ties in 20 games (4–14–2). The Thunder initially struggled with only one win in Burnett's first 12 games as coach before turning around. Burnett led Niagara Falls to a record of 19–25–2 during his tenure, and a record of 23–39–4 overall, to earn sixth place and the final playoff spot in the Emms Division. Keith Primeau won the Eddie Powers Memorial Trophy as the league's leading scorer, with 57 goals, 70 assists, and 127 points. Brad May was second in team scoring with 33 goals, 58 assists, and 91 points. Rounding out the top scorers were Jason Winch (71 points), Paul Laus (48 points) and Andy Bezeau (39 points). In the first round of the playoffs, Niagara faced the first placed London Knights. Burnett's Thunder won the first two games by scores of 7–6, and 5–1, then lost two in a row by scores of 2–6, and 3–5. Niagara pulled out a 3–2 victory in overtime in game five, then won game six by a 6–2 score to win an upset series. In the second round, Burnett's team faced the fourth placed Owen Sound Platers. Niagara lost the first game by a 3–7 score, but then Burnett coach four straight victories by scores of 11–2, 3–2, 4–3, and 7–4 to win the series in five games and earn a trip to the division finals. Niagara faced the second place Kitchener Rangers, trying to pull off a third consecutive upset. The Thunder lost the first two games by 2–5, and 1–5 scores, then won game three by a 6–5 score. The cinderella run by Burnett and Niagara Falls came to an end as the Thunder lost the last two games by 3–5, and 5–10 scores, and lost the series in five games. If Niagara had won the third round, they would have faced Burnett's old team, the Oshawa Generals in the finals.

==== 1990–1991 ====
In the 1990–91 OHL season, Burnett participated in his first OHL draft as a general manager. The Niagara Falls Thunder had five draft picks in the first three rounds. Burnett drafted three future NHLers; first round pick Steve Staios, second round pick Manny Legace, and third round pick Greg de Vries. Staios and Legace had an immediate impact for Burnett's team, however Greg de Vries did not report to Niagara Falls until the 1992–93 season. Burnett had the second highest scoring team in the OHL, with 335 goals scored. The team was led in scoring by second-year centre Todd Simon, with 51 goals, 74 assists, and 125 points. Jason Winch scored 40 goals, 82 assists, and 122 points. Also scoring 30 goals were John Johnson with 38 goals, and Brad May netted 37 goals. Burnett led the Thunder to a 39–18–9 record, earning 87 points and a second-place finish in the Emms Division. In the first round of the playoffs, Niagara Falls faced the fifth place Kitchener Rangers. Burnett's team won the first game 5–4 in overtime, then lost 6–7 in overtime, followed by two wins by 5–1, and 7–4 scores. After losing game five by a 3–4 score, Burnett and the Thunder won the series in six games with a 5–2 victory. In the second round, Niagara Falls faced the fourth place Windsor Spitfires, and swept the series in four games by scores of 7–2, 10–4, 4–3, and 6–5. Burnett had led the Thunder to the Emms Division finals again, and facing the first place Sault Ste. Marie Greyhounds. Niagara Falls was swept in four games by scores of 2–7, 0–2, 4–6, and 3–8. Burnett had greatly improved the Thunder by 37 points over the previous season, and was awarded the Matt Leyden Trophy for OHL Coach of the Year.

==== 1991–1992 ====
Burnett returned for a third year with the Thunder in 1991–92 OHL season, with most of the previous year's team intact. In the OHL draft, Burnett picked future NHLer Ethan Moreau in the first round, and defenceman Ryan Tocher in the second round. Burnett's team topped 300 goals scored for the season. Todd Simon led the team, and the league in scoring with 53 goals, 93 assists, and 146 points, to win the Eddie Powers Memorial Trophy. Other top scorers include Kevin Brown with 42 goals, 58 assists, and 100 points; Rick Corriveau with 21 goals, 57 assists, and 78 points; and Ethan Moreau with 20 goals, 36 assists, and 55 points in his rookie season. Burnett led the team to a 39–23–4 record, earning 82 points and second place in the Emms Division. In the playoffs, the Thunder faced the seventh place Detroit Compuware Ambassadors first round. Burnett's team struggled at first against Detroit, a team in its franchise's first playoff appearance. Detroit won the first two games by 3–5, and 3–4 scores. Niagara Falls won game three 8–6, but lost game four by a 3–5 score and was in danger of being eliminated. Burnett rallied his team to three straights wins by 6–3, 8–3, and 7–2 victories to win the series in seven games. In the second round the Thunder faced the third place London Knights. Burnett's team won another three straight games by scores of 4–3 in overtime OT, 4–3, and 5–4 in overtime. After a 2–4 loss in game four, the Thunder won game five by a 5–1 score. To return to the Emms division finals against the first place Sault Ste. Marie Greyhounds. Burnett's team won the first game 8–7, but then lost four straight by 2–7, 5–7, 3–4, and 1–7 scores. Burnett was awarded his second Matt Leyden Trophy as OHL Coach of the Year for 1991–92.

=== Cape Breton Oilers (1992–1994) ===
Burnett was head coach of the Edmonton Oilers' American Hockey League affiliate, the Cape Breton Oilers for two seasons starting in the 1992–93 AHL season. His assistant coach in both seasons was Norm Ferguson, a local NHL and WHA veteran forward from Sydney, Nova Scotia. In his first season with the club, Burnett led Cape Breton to a 36–32–12 record, earning 84 points and third place in the Atlantic Division, earning a playoff berth. Dan Currie led the team with 98 points in the regular season. Burnett led the Oilers through the first round of playoffs defeating the second place Fredericton Canadiens in five games, and defeated the first place St. John's Maple Leafs in four games. Cape Breton defeated the Springfield Indians in two games of a best-of-three series with the winner advancing to the finals. Burnett's Oilers defeated the Rochester Americans in five games to capture the first Calder Cup in franchise history. The Oilers charge through the playoffs was led by Bill McDougall, scoring 26 goals and 26 assists in 16 games and being awarded the Jack A. Butterfield Trophy as the most valuable player of playoffs.

Burnett coached Cape Breton in the 1993–94 AHL season to a 32-35-13 record, earning 77 points and fourth place in the Atlantic Division. Peter White led the team with 70 points. Jim Nesich was awarded the Fred T. Hunt Memorial Award as the player best exemplifying sportsmanship, determination and dedication to hockey. In the postseason, the Oilers lost to the St. John's Maple Leafs in five games in the first round. After the season, Burnett was promoted to become the head coach of the Edmonton Oilers.

=== Edmonton Oilers (1994–1995) ===
Burnett took over the head coaching duties for the 1994–95 Edmonton Oilers season. Due to the 1994–95 NHL lockout, his first game coaching the Edmonton Oilers would be January 20, 1995, a win 2–1 win over the Mighty Ducks of Anaheim 2-1. After 27 games into the 1994–95 NHL season the Oilers had a 12–13–3 record. The club then lost seven games in a row to fall to 12–20–3. During this losing streak, Burnett had a publicized dispute with team captain Shayne Corson. After a 7–2 loss to the Los Angeles Kings on April 3, 1995, Burnett took the captaincy away from Corson. General manager Glen Sather relieved Burnett of his duties after a 4–3 overtime loss to the Mighty Ducks of Anaheim on April 5, 1995. Burnett was replaced with assistant coach Ron Low for the remainder of the season.

=== Binghamton Rangers (1995–1997) ===
Burnett returned to the coaching in the American Hockey League after his NHL tenure. Burnett was hired as head coach of the New York Rangers' AHL affiliate, the Binghamton Rangers. Mike Busniuk was his assistant coach for two seasons in Binghamton. In the 1995–96 AHL season, Burnett led the club to the South Division title with a 39–31–7–3 record and 88 points. The Rangers were led in scoring by twin brothers Peter Ferraro (101 points) and Chris Ferraro (99 points). In the playoffs, the Rangers were upset by the Syracuse Crunch in the first round.

Burnett returned for the 1996–97 AHL season. The Rangers offence struggled in the newly created Empire Division, scoring 88 fewer goals than the previous season. The Rangers finished in fifth place with a 27-38-13-2 record earning 69 points. In the playoffs, the Rangers lost to the St. John's Maple Leafs in the first round. Burnett was let go after the season.

=== Guelph Storm (1997–1998) ===
Burnett was hired as head coach of the Guelph Storm for the 1997–98 OHL season by general manager Alan Millar. Burnett took over a Storm team that made it to third round the playoffs in 1996–97 and the league finals both years before that. Burnett's team included six future NHL players; Eric Beaudoin, Chris Hajt, Manny Malhotra, Kent McDonell, Brian McGrattan and Brian Willsie. Burnett's team had a balanced attack, with only one playing having 70 points. Brian Willsie led the team in scoring with 45 goals and 76 points. Burnett also have five other twenty-goal scorers in Andrew Long (29), Kent McDonell (28), Nick Bootland (23), Matt Lahey (23), and Jason Jackman (21). Off the ice, Manny Malhotra was awarded the Bobby Smith Trophy as the OHL's scholastic player of the year. Burnett's team conceded the second fewest goals against in the league. Goaltender Chris Madden played 51 games, and won 33. The Storm had struggled in the early part of the year, but after February 20 the team had an 18–2–2 record in the last 22 games. Burnett led the Storm to first overall in the OHL with a 42–18–6 record overall, earning 90 points and the Emms Trophy as winners of the central division, and the Hamilton Spectator Trophy as first overall in the league. In the playoffs, Guelph earned a first round bye, then swept the central division's fifth place Sudbury Wolves in the second round, by scores of 6–3, 4–1, 8–1, and 4–1. In the third round, Guelph swept the west division's second place Plymouth Whalers by scores of 2–1, 5–1, 5–1, and 5–2. In the OHL championship, Burnett's team faced the Ottawa 67's, winners of the east division, and second place overall in the regular season. Guelph won the first two games by scores of 5–2, and 3–2, but were blown out in game three, losing 1–8. Burnett rallied his team to two consecutive one-goal victories, winning 2–1, and 4–3 to claim his only J. Ross Robertson Cup to date as the Storm defeated Ottawa in five games.

==== 1998 Memorial Cup ====
Burnett and the Storm continued onto the 1998 Memorial Cup hosted in Spokane, Washington. The host team Spokane Chiefs were coached by Mike Babcock, a teammate of Burnett's while at McGill University. Guelph lost the first game against the Portland Winterhawks by a 2–6 score. Burnett's team rebounded by winning the next two games, 3–1 over the Spokane Chiefs, and 7–0 over the Val-d'Or Foreurs. The 2–1 round-robin record put the Storm in the semifinals, where Burnett's Storm defeated the Spokane Chiefs 2–1 in overtime. Burnett was just one goal away from winning the Memorial Cup, as the Storm lost 3–4 in overtime in the final against the Portland Winterhawks. Goaltender Chris Madden was awarded the Hap Emms Memorial Trophy as outstanding goaltender at the Memorial Cup, and also the Stafford Smythe Memorial Trophy as most valuable player in the tournament. Manny Malhotra was named the most sportsmanlike player, winning the George Parsons Trophy. Burnett was set to return to Guelph for the 1998–99 OHL season, but resigned on August 18, 1998, to return to coaching in the NHL.

=== Mighty Ducks of Anaheim (1998–2000) ===
After a very successful season with Guelph, Burnett returned to the NHL for the 1998–99 season as an assistant coach to Craig Hartsburg and the Mighty Ducks of Anaheim. The Mighty Ducks were led in scoring by Teemu Selanne and Paul Kariya, and finished with a 35–34–13 record earning 83 points and sixth place in the Western Conference. In the playoffs, the Mighty Ducks were swept by the Detroit Red Wings in four games. In the 1999-2000 season, the Mighty Ducks finished with a 34–33–12–3 record earning 83 points, and ninth place, missing the playoffs.

=== Oshawa Generals (2000–2004) ===
Eleven seasons after being hired as an assistant coach with the Oshawa Generals, Burnett returned to his original OHL team in the dual role as head coach and general manager. Michael Futa was an assistant coach and the assistant general manager for Burnett's first two seasons in Oshawa. Barclay Branch (son of OHL commissioner David Branch) was an assistant coach each of first three seasons under Burnett, then director of scouting and player development in Burnett's fourth season. Former Oshawa Generals captain Joe Cirella remained with the team as an assistant coach all four seasons with Burnett. In Burnett's four seasons with the Generals, he coached 272 games in the regular season and earned 107 wins.

==== 2000–2001 ====
Burnett took over a club with very few returning veterans for the 2000–01 OHL season. Burnett started rebuilding with the OHL entry draft by selecting future stars Ben Eager in the first round, and Paul Ranger in the second round. The team struggled offensively scoring only 184 goals, and were led by Jamie Johnson with 46 points. Oshawa finished the season with a 20–36–7–5 record and 52 points, for ninth place in the eastern conference, missing the playoffs. The bright spots in the season were the progress of draft picks Eager and Ranger, and the arrival of rookie Brandon Nolan. Oshawa would also pick second overall in next season's OHL draft.

==== 2001–2002 ====
In the 2001–02 OHL season, Burnett used the second overall draft pick to select Nathan Horton, who had a successful rookie season with 31 goals, 36 assists and 67 points. The Generals offence was again led by Jamie Johnson with 17 goals, 61 assists, and 78 points. Oshawa featured two more 30-goal scorers in Chris Minard (36 goals) and Brandon Nolan (30 goals). Ben Eager added 14 goals and a physical presence, tied for third in the league with 255 penalty minutes. Burnett also added partial seasons from future NHLers Brian McGrattan and Sean McMorrow to improve the team record to 23–33–7–5, earning 58 points, and seventh place in the eastern conference. The Generals faced the second place Belleville Bulls in the playoffs. Oshawa won the first game 4–3 on home ice, but then lost the next four games by scores of 0–3, and three consecutive one-goal games by 1–2, 4–5 (OT), and 2–3.

==== 2002–2003 ====
For the 2002–03 OHL season, Burnett looked to add more size and offence. Burnett acquired the OHL rights to overage forward Anthony Aquino in a trade with the Owen Sound Attack in the previous season. Aquino was having a stellar season with the Generals, scoring 10 goals and 9 assists in only 14 games, when the league ruled him ineligible to continue playing on November 5. Burnett replaced this loss with Ahren Nittel who scored 15 goals and 7 assists in just 20 games. Goaltender Chris Beckford-Tseu had a breakout season playing 54 games, winning 25. Jamie Johnson led the team in points for the third consecutive season, with 24 goals, 76 assists, and 100 points. Burnett's Generals also had 30-goal seasons from Brandon Nolan (36 goals), and Nathan Horton (33 goals). Burnett had built a strong team that was in third place as of February 21, until a nine-game losing streak had them in seventh place with one game to play. Burnett was able to win the final game of the year 7–5 over the Peterborough Petes to finish sixth place in the conference with a record of 34–30–2–2 and 72 points. Burnett and the Generals would face the third place Petes in the first round of the playoffs, with 4 of the 7 games decided in overtime. Oshawa won game one 3–2 (OT), lost game two 5–6 (OT) and game three 4–5 (OT). Oshawa won two of the next three games by score of 3–0, 2–5, and 3–1 to set up a game 7 in Peterborough. Burnett's season looked to be over as the Petes held onto a 3–2 lead late into the third period, when Brandon Nolan tied the game with 3 seconds on the clock, then Nathan Horton scored the winner in overtime. Burnett led the Generals into round two against the first place Ottawa 67's. Burnett's team split the first four games by scores of 3–2, 3–4, 1–8, and 7–5, but were easily defeated in the last two games by scores of 1–7, and 0–6.

==== 2003–2004 ====
Burnett began a rebuilding process for the 2003–04 OHL season, by trading to get younger players, including goalkeeper Dan Turple who won 20 games and played in 35 games. Rookies and 16-year-old twins Tyler Donati and Justin Donati from the previous season's draft, emerged as offensive leaders. Second year forward Adam Berti emerged as one of the top scorers, with 17 goals and 29 assists, after being limited to just 15 games in the previous season. Ben Eager led the team in goals with 25, Tyler Donati led in overall points with 20 goals, 36 assists, and 56 points. First round draft pick Justin Wallingford was selected to help build the defence. Burnett's Generals finished the season with a 30–29–8–1 record, earning 69 points and sixth place in the conference. In the playoffs, Oshawa faced the third place Mississauga IceDogs. Oshawa lost the first game 0–3, but came back with two wins by scores of 1–0, and 5–2. Mississauga won the next two games 2–0, and 5–1. Burnett pulled out a season-saving 4–3 overtime win in game six, but lost the final game by a score of 1–6. The Generals were sold to new owners in the off-season. Burnett was let go after choosing the Generals' draft picks in the OHL entry draft for the upcoming season.

=== Belleville Bulls (2004–2015) ===
Burnett was hired to become the head coach and general manager of the Belleville Bulls by a former high school friend, and team's new owner Gord Simmonds. Barclay Branch followed Burnett to Belleville and served as Burnett's assistant general manager and director of player personnel all eleven seasons. Burnett's assistant coach for his entire eleven season tenure in Belleville was Jake Grimes, a former player with the Bulls. Belleville native Jason Supryka was an assistant coach for eight of the eleven seasons, and a conditioning coach for the other three seasons. In Burnett's eleven seasons with the Belleville Bulls, he coached 748 games in the regular season and earned 365 wins, won four division titles, and one Memorial Cup appearance in 2008.

==== 2004–2005 ====
For the 2004–05 OHL season, Burnett took over a team that had finished last in the league in the previous season. His hiring was after the Bulls took part in the OHL draft, choosing John Hughes first overall. The Bulls were led by top scorer Marc Rancourt with 26 goals, 52 assists, and 78 points. Burnett also found two other twenty-goal scorers in Evan Brophey (25), Cody Thornton (23), and the emergence of two future NHL-ers in rookies Matt Beleskey and Shawn Matthias. Burnett led the club to a 29–29–6–4 record, earning 68 points, and seventh place in the eastern conference. In the playoffs, Belleville faced the second place Peterborough Petes. The Bulls lost the first three games by scores of 0–5, 2–3, and 1–5. Burnett and the Bulls pulled out a 4–3 overtime win in game four, but lost the fifth game by a score of 1–4.

==== 2005–2006 ====
Burnett took over the full drafting responsibilities for the 2005–06 OHL season, and drafted Bryan Cameron in the first round. Cameron scored 20 goals as a rookie, and John Hughes led the team in scoring with 28 goals, 54 assists, and 82 points. Also emerging as a rookie was sixth round draft pick P. K. Subban. Goaltender Kevin Lalande played in 50 games, winning 24. Burnett improved the Bulls record to 32–28–5–3, earning 72 points and seventh place in the conference, and facing the second place Brampton Battalion in the first round. Belleville split the first two games by 3–2 overtime scores, then two in a row by scores of 1–3 and 3–4 in overtime. After winning game five 3–2, Burnett and the Bulls lost game six 2–5 on home ice.

==== 2006–2007 ====
The 2006–07 OHL season was Burnett's third season of rebuilding, and continued improvement on previous seasons. Burnett solidified the team with OHL draft picks Shawn Lalonde and Marc Cantin on defence, and goaltender Edward Pasquale. The offence was bolstered by acquiring Tyler Donati, whom Burnett previously drafted with the Oshawa Generals. Donati led the team with 54 goals, 75 assists, and 129 points, winning the Leo Lalonde Memorial Trophy as the league's best overage player. Rounding out the offence were Shawn Matthias with 38 goals, Bryan Cameron with 33 goals, and Matt Beleskey with 27 goals. Burnett had a strong debut from rookie Eric Tangradi, drafted in the previous season. Off the ice, Andrew Gibbons was the OHL's humanitarian winner of the Dan Snyder Memorial Trophy. Burnett led the Bulls to the east division title and the Leyden Trophy with a 39–24–0–5 record, earning 83 points and second place in the conference. In the playoffs, the Bulls faced seventh place Ottawa 67's in the first round. After losing the first game 3–4 in overtime, Burnett and the Bulls won four consecutive games by scores of 5–4, 3–0, 4–2, and 4–3 in overtime. Burnett's Bulls were well prepared for the second round, and swept the fourth place Oshawa Generals in four games by scores of 7–5, 5–2, 6–4, and 5–2. The Bulls faced the sixth place Sudbury Wolves in the third round, and eastern Conference finals, and Burnett coached his ninth straight playoff victory by a 3–2 score in game one. Four of the next five games went into overtime. The Wolves won game two in overtime, 2–3. Burnett pulled out a 2–1 overtime win in game three, only to see the Wolves win the next three games by scores of 2-3 in overtime, 1–4, and game six 3–4 in triple overtime.

==== 2007–2008 ====
In the 2007–08 OHL season, Burnett had his most successful regular season as a coach in terms of most wins and points, and led the Bulls to the most wins and points in a season in franchise history. Burnett led the Bulls to a record of 48–14–4–2 and 102 points to win another Leyden Trophy, and finish first overall in the eastern conference. Burnett use Belleville's first round draft pick to select future NHLer Tyler Randell. Burnett's offence was built around Matt Beleskey who led the team with 41 goals, 49 assists, and 90 points. Burnett also had 20–goal seasons from Bryan Cameron (41 goals), Shawn Matthias (32 goals), Eric Tangradi (24 goals), and Keaton Turkiewicz (23 goals). Burnett made mid-season trades for forwards Jan Mursak and A.J. Perry, and veteran defender Nigel Williams. Goaltender Mike Murphy led the league with 36 wins, and a 2.24 GAA, winning the OHL Goaltender of the Year award. In the first round of the playoffs, Belleville faced the eighth place Peterborough Petes. Belleville won the first game 4–1, then lost game two 4–5 in overtime. Burnett's team won the next three games by scores of 4–3, 3–2 in overtime, and 7–1 to win the series in five games. Belleville swept the seventh place Barrie Colts in the second round, by scores of 7–2, 5–1, 2–1, and 3–2. In the third round, Burnett's Bulls faced the third place Oshawa Generals. Belleville won the first three games by scores of 3–2, 4–3, and 5–2. Burnett's team rebounded from a 1–2 loss in game four, with a resounding 11–0 victory in game five to win the eastern conference finals in five games, and win the Bobby Orr Trophy. Burnett reached the J. Ross Robertson Cup final for the second time in his coaching career, as the Bulls faced the first place team in the regular season, the Kitchener Rangers. Burnett's team lost the first three games by scores of 2–5, 2–5, and 3–5. Belleville won the next three games by scores of 5–4 in overtime, 2–1, and 6–3. Burnett was denied his second OHL championships, as Kitchener won the seventh game by a score of 4–1.

==== 2008 Memorial Cup ====
Burnett and the Bulls qualified for the 2008 Memorial Cup as the OHL representative, since the Kitchener Rangers were already guaranteed a berth as the host team. This would be the second Memorial Cup coaching appearance for Burnett, after coaching the Guelph Storm to the 1998 Memorial Cup final. Burnett and the Bulls faced the Spokane Chiefs in their first game, losing 4–5 in overtime. Belleville won their second game 6–3 versus the Gatineau Olympiques. Burnett's team faced the Kitchener Rangers in the final game of the round robin. Belleville prevailed with a 4–3 overtime win, with goaltender Mike Murphy making 54 saves. Burnett's team finished the round-robin in second place, and faced the Kitchener Rangers again in the semifinal. Burnett's team was overwhelmed in the rematch, losing 0–9, as the Bulls finished the tournament in third place.

==== 2008–2009 ====
Burnett had a large group of returning players for the 2008–09 OHL season, and looked to repeat the success. Burnett drafted Stephen Silas in the first round to add to defence. Eric Tangradi led the scoring with 38 goals, 50 assists, and 88 points. Bryan Cameron also contributed 37 goals, 44 assists, and 81 points. P.K. Subban had 14 goals, 62 assists, and 76 points on defence and was a +47 in plus/minus rating. Goaltender Mike Murphy improved on the previous season by leading the league with 40 wins, and a 2.08 GAA, to win the OHL Goaltender of the Year award again, in addition to the Dave Pinkney Trophy for the team with the best goals against average, and the CHL Goaltender of the Year award. Burnett led the Bulls to the best record in the eastern conference at 47–17–2–2, earning 98 points and a third consecutive Leyden Trophy. Burnett and the Bulls faced the eighth place Sudbury Wolves in the first round. Belleville split the first two games at home by scores of 3–1 and 1–2, then won the next two games on the road 3–1 and 2–1. Sudbury won game five 6–2 on home ice, but Belleville closed out the series at home in six games with a 6–1 win. Burnett's team faced the sixth place Niagara IceDogs in the second round, and won the first two games in overtime, by scores of 4–3 and 5–4. After losing game three 0–2, Belleville had two straight 5–2 victories to win the series in five games. Burnett's team returned to the eastern conference finals for the third consecutive season, and would face the second place Brampton Battalion. Belleville lost the first two games by scores of 2–4 and 2–7, then split the next two games winning 6–2, then lost 3–4. Burnett coached a 3–2 double overtime win in game five to extend the series, but lost game six 4–7 on the road.

==== 2009–2010 ====
Burnett began a rebuilding process for the Bulls in the 2009–10 OHL season. In the OHL draft, Burnett used his first pick to select local Quinte Red Devils goalie, Tyson Teichmann, followed up by centre Michael Curtis. Also drafted were Scott Simmonds (son of owner Gord Simmonds), and Malcolm Subban (brother of P. K. Subban). The Bulls struggled on offence, as the top two scorers were defencemen Shawn Lalonde with 13 goals, 43 assists, and 56 points; and Stephen Silas with 4 goals, 45 assists, and 49 points. Luke Judson scored 29 goals, and rookie Michael Curtis scored 19 goals. Burnett's team finished with a record of 20–40–2–6 and 48 points, placing last in the eastern conference and missed the playoffs.

==== 2010–2011 ====
Burnett continued the rebuilding process with the 2010–11 OHL season, and used his second overall pick in the OHL entry draft to select future NHLer Brendan Gaunce. The offence was led by Andy Bathgate with 25 goals, 35 assists, and Luke Judson with 28 goals, and 28 assists. Malcolm Subban won 10 games in net with a 3.16 GAA Despite earning fewer points than the previous season, Burnett's team finished eighth place in the conference with a 21–43–0–4 record, and 46 points. Belleville was overmatched in the first round of the playoffs, being held to a single goal scored, and were swept by the first place Mississauga St. Michael's Majors, by scores of 1–4, 0–1, 0–2, and 0–4.

==== 2011–2012 ====
Burnett achieved a couple coaching milestones in the early part of the 2011–12 OHL season. Burnett coached his 1000th OHL regular season game on October 13, 2011. Burnett recorded his 500th OHL coaching victory on December 2, 2011.

Burnett used his first round draft pick in the 2011–12 OHL season to select Jordan Subban, younger brother of P.K. and Malcolm Subban. Burnett had four twenty-goal scorers in Brendan Gaunce (28), Austen Brassard (27), Daniil Zharkov (23), and Adam Payerl (22). Goaltender Malcolm Subban had 25 wins and a 2.50 GAA. Burnett improved the team to a 35–32–1–0 record, earning 71 points. The seventh place Bulls faced the second place Ottawa 67's in the playoffs. The Bulls lost the first two games by scores of 2–3 in overtime, and 2–4. Burnett coached two consecutive 4–3 overtime victories to tie the series, but lost the next two games by scores of 2–5, and 1–2.

==== 2012–2013 ====
Burnett had a lot of returning players for the 2012–13 OHL season, and added Niki Petti, Daniel De Sousa, Michael Cramarossa, and Chad Heffernan in the draft. Burnett's top line in included Joseph Cramarossa leading the team in scoring with 19 goals, 44 assists, and 63 points, and Brendan Gaunce with 33 goals, 27 assists, and 60 points. Daniil Zharkov added 25 goals to a team with a balanced offence. Burnett made key mid-season acquisitions to build the team, adding centreman and Belleville native Alan Quine, overage defenceman Jake Cardwell, and forward Tyler Graovac who would win the William Hanley Trophy as the league's most sportsmanlike player. Burnett's team conceded the second fewest goals in the league, and both goaltenders had excellent seasons. Malcolm Subban had 29 wins, and led the league with a 2.14 GAA. Backup goalie Charlie Graham had 15 wins, and a 2.59 GAA. Burnett led the Bulls to a 44–16–5–3 record, and 96 points to win another Leyden Trophy, and first place in the Eastern Conference. The Bulls faced the eighth place Mississauga Steelheads in the first round of the playoffs. Belleville won the first two games at home by scores of 8-1, and 4-1, then lost two games on the road by scores of 1-2, and 2-5. Returning home for game five, Burnett's team won 5-0, then finished the series with a 3–1 win in game six. In the second round, Belleville swept the fifth place Sudbury Wolves by scores of 6-3, 4-1, 4-0, and 5-0. Burnett had returned his team to the third round of the playoffs for the fourth time since taking over in Belleville, and then faced the second place Barrie Colts. Belleville won the first game 3-2, but lost three straight games by scores of 0-5, 4-5 in overtime, and 3-4 in overtime. Burnett coached two consecutive 3-1 victories to even the series, but lost game seven by a score of 1-3.

==== 2013–2014 ====
Burnett began another rebuilding cycle for the 2013–14 OHL season, with a lot of trades made. Remi Elie was brought in from the London Knights, and led the team in scoring with 28 goals, 37 assists, and 65 points. Overage forward Cameron Brace came from the Owen Sound Attack and scored 27 goals. Jordan Subban led the defence with 12 goals, and 30 assists. OHL entry draft picks Justin Lemcke, and Adam Laishram, earned the most playing time for 16-year-olds. Charlie Graham emerged as the number one goalie playing 53 games. Scott Simmonds was awarded the Dan Snyder Memorial Trophy as the OHL Humanitarian recipient. The Bulls finished with a record of 23–38–4–3 record, earning 53 points. Burnett's team narrowly missed the playoffs, just one point out of eighth place.

==== 2014–2015 ====
Burnett continued to build the Bulls for the 2014–15 OHL season. Defenceman Jordan Subban led the team in scoring with 25 goals, 27 assists, and 52 points. In the OHL draft, Burnett picked up centreman Brandon Saigeon, and defenceman Cole Candella. Goaltender Charlie Graham played 51 games, earning 23 wins. Burnett recorded his 600th OHL coaching victory on December 13, 2014. Burnett improved the team's record to 27–33–3–5, earning 62 points and seventh place. On March 12, 2015, it was announced that Gord Simmonds had sold the team to Michael Andlauer, and it would be relocated to Hamilton, Ontario, for next season. Burnett and the Bulls entered the playoffs knowing it would be the final chance for success in Belleville. The Bulls faced the second place Barrie Colts in the first round, and were swept in four games, by scores of 2-3, 2-8, 1-2 in overtime, and 2-4.

=== Hamilton Bulldogs (2015–2016) ===
The Belleville Bulls became the Hamilton Bulldogs for the 2015–16 OHL season. On April 10, 2015, Andlauer confirmed that Burnett was retained to be head coach and general manager of the Bulldogs. Burnett's assistant coaches were Troy Smith who was previously head coach of the Kitchener Rangers, and Ron Wilson who was a long-time assistant coach in the AHL and had worked with the previous Hamilton Bulldogs. Burnett's new boss would become Steve Staios, who was named president of the Bulldogs on June 5, 2015. Staios had previously played for Burnett on the Niagara Falls Thunder. Burnett continued a rebuilding process in Hamilton that started the previous season in Belleville. The Bulldogs offence struggled as no player scored 60 points in the season, and the team scored only 197 goals. The Bulldogs finished in ninth place with a 25–35–8–0 record, and missed the playoffs. On April 4, 2016, Burnett was terminated as Bulldogs coach and general manager as the team wanted to go a different direction and separate the two roles.

=== Flint Firebirds (2016–2017) ===
On May 17, 2016, the OHL appointed Burnett as the general manager of the Flint Firebirds, signing a three-year contract starting with the 2016–17 season. Burnett took over the managing duties of a Firebirds franchise that earned only 46 points in the 2015–16 season and had missed the playoffs for a second consecutive season. Burnett was successful in getting commitments from each of the top three draft picks, including fellow Port Perry native and first round draft pick Ty Dellandrea. In the 2016–17 season the Firebirds earned 72 points, and making the playoffs as the 7th place seed. In the off-season, Burnett left the Firebirds to return to the Guelph Storm.

=== Guelph Storm (2017–present) ===
After a year off from coaching, Burnett returned to the Guelph Storm for the 2017–18 OHL season in the dual role as head coach and general manager. Burnett takes over a team that finished last place in the Western Conference in the 2016–17 season. Burnett used the second overall pick in the 2017 OHL entry draft to select Tag Bertuzzi, the son of Guelph Storm alumnus Todd Bertuzzi.

On September 22, 2017, Burnett coached his first game in his return to Guelph, as the Storm lost to the Sarnia Sting 4-3 in a shootout. One week later, on September 29, Burnett earned his first victory with the Storm since 1998, as Guelph defeated the Oshawa Generals 5-4. Under Burnett, the Storm improved in the 2017-18 season, as Guelph returned to the post-season since 2015, as they earned a record of 30-29-9 record, finishing in seventh place in the Western Conference. In the post-season, the Storm took the heavily favoured Kitchener Rangers to six games in the first round before being eliminated from the playoffs.

Guelph saw more improvement during the 2018-19 OHL season, as the club finished in fourth place in the Western Conference with a 40-18-10 record, earning 90 points. In the post-season, the Storm swept the Kitchener Rangers in four games in a rematch from the previous season in the Western Conference quarter-finals. In the semi-finals, the Storm found themselves down 3-0 in their series against the London Knights, however, Guelph rebounded and staved off elimination, winning four games in a row to win the series and advance to the Western Conference finals. In the conference finals against the Saginaw Spirit, Guelph dropped their first two games, however, the Storm turned the series around, winning four in a row, to win the series and advance to the J. Ross Robertson Cup finals. In the championship round, Guelph once again dropped their first two games against the Ottawa 67's. The Storm once again turned the series around, winning four games in a row, to win the 2019 OHL championship and earning a berth in the 2019 Memorial Cup. At the tournament, Guelph finished the round-robin portion in second place with a 2–1 record. In the semi-final game, Guelph lost to the Rouyn-Noranda Huskies 6-4 to be eliminated from the tournament.

Many expected the Storm to struggle during the 2019-20 OHL season, as a number of veteran players graduated from the club following their championship run. Guelph finished the season with a 32-23-8 record, earning 72 points, and sixth place in the Western Conference, exceeding expectations. The 2020 post-season was cancelled due to the 2020 coronavirus pandemic in North America.

The 2020-21 season was cancelled due to the COVID-19 pandemic.

Burnett was back behind the Storm bench for the 2021-22 OHL season, leading the club to a 36-24-5-3 record, earning 80 points and finishing in fifth place in the Western Conference. In the post-season, Guelph lost to the Sault Ste. Marie Greyhounds in five games during the conference quarter-finals. On June 10, 2022, Burnett stepped down as head coach of the club, as Scott Walker was named as his replacement. Burnett will remain with the club as the general manager for the 2022-23 season.

== National coaching duties ==
Burnett's success with the Guelph Storm earned him his first Hockey Canada appointment. Burnett was named head coach of Canada's U20 National Junior team for the 1999 World Junior Ice Hockey Championships in Winnipeg. Claude Julien and Stan Butler were named as assistant coaches. After the conclusion of the team's summer evaluation camp, Burnett resigned on August 18, 1998, to become an assistant coach for the Mighty Ducks of Anaheim in the NHL. The team would claim the silver medal with Tom Renney replacing Burnett.

In 2001 while coaching the Oshawa Generals, Burnett was named head coach of Canada's U18 National team along with assistant coaches Jim Hulton and Guy Lalonde for the summer's Six Nations Cup in the Czech Republic. Canada defeated the host team Czech Republic in the final to win the gold medal.

Burnett was named to four Team Canada staffs while coaching with the Belleville Bulls. Burnett was named an assistant coach for Canada's U18 National team at the 2010 IIHF World U18 Championships in Belarus, along with head coach Guy Carbonneau, and assistant coach Rob Sumner. Canada lost its first game 1–3 to Switzerland, won its second game 11–3 against Belarus, lost the third game 0–5 to the United States, and lost its fourth game 4–5 to Sweden. Canada missed out on the medal round and played in the relegation round instead. Canada won 5–1 against Latvia, and won 4–2 against Slovakia to finish 7th overall and avoid relegation.

Burnett was promoted to head coach of the U18 National team for the summer's 2010 Ivan Hlinka Memorial Tournament, with Jim Hiller and Ron Choules as assistant coaches. The event was jointly hosted in Slovakia and the Czech Republic. Canada won its first three games to progress to the medal round. Canada defeated the Czech Republic 6–2 in the semifinal and defeated the United States 1–0 in the final to win the gold medal.

On July 20, 2010, Burnett was named to replace Bob Boughner as an assistant coach for the Canada's U20 National Junior team to work with head coach Dave Cameron and assistant coaches Ryan Huska and André Tourigny. The 2011 World Junior Ice Hockey Championships began on Boxing Day in Buffalo, New York. In the opening game, Canada won 6–3 against Russia. Canada won its next two games, 7–2 over the Czech Republic and 10–1 over Norway. In the fourth game, Canada lost 5–6 to Sweden in a shootout. Canada won 4–1 over Switzerland in the quarterfinals, and won 4–1 over the United States in the semifinals. The gold medal game was between Canada and Russia. The game marked Canada's tenth consecutive appearance in the final. The Russians had lost their three previous gold medal games to Canada. Canada led 3–0 after two periods. However, the Russians scored five unanswered goals in the third period, including two in a span of 13 seconds, to win the game. Canada won the silver medal.

Burnett and Huska returned to Canada's U20 National Junior team, joined by new head coach Don Hay, and assistant coach Scott Walker The 2012 World Junior Ice Hockey Championships were hosted between Calgary and Edmonton, Alberta. Team Canada won all four games in the groups stage; 8–1 over Finland, 5–0 over the Czech Republic, 10–2 over Denmark, and 3–2 over the United States. Canada earned a bye into the semifinals, then played team Russia. Canada missed the final for the first time in 11 years when they lost 5–6, in a game which Canada was down 1–6 halfway through the third period. Canada won the bronze medal with a 4–0 victory over Finland.

== Personal life ==
Burnett was born on March 25, 1962, in Port Perry, Ontario. He graduated from the McGill University with a physical education degree in 1985. Burnett had intended on being a teacher if he didn't follow a professional playing career. Burnett had spent some summers teaching and working with kids at a local detention school. Burnett later taught at Port Perry High School where he had attended as a student.

On October 22, 2009, Burnett was inducted into the Township of Scugog Sports Hall of Fame.

== Coaching record ==
Team	Year	League	Regular season							Playoffs
Team	Year	League	G	W	L	T	OTL	Pts	Finish	Result
Niagara Falls Thunder	1989–90	OHL	46	19	25	2	–	(50)	6th in Emms	Won in division quarterfinals (4-2 vs. LDN); Won in OHL quarterfinals (4-1 vs. OS); Lost in OHL semifinals (1-4 vs. KIT)
Niagara Falls Thunder	1990–91	OHL	66	39	18	9	–	87	2nd in Emms	Won in division quarterfinals (4-2 vs. KIT); Won in OHL quarterfinals (4-0 vs. WSR); Lost in OHL semifinals (0-4 vs. SSM)
Niagara Falls Thunder	1991–92	OHL	66	39	23	4	–	82	2nd in Emms	Won in division quarterfinals (4-3 vs. DET); Won in OHL quarterfinals (4-1 vs. LDN); Lost in OHL semifinals (1-4 vs. SSM)
Cape Breton Oilers	1992–93	AHL	80	36	32	12	–	84	3rd in Atlantic	Won in division semifinals (4-1 vs. FRE); Won in division finals (4-0 vs. STJ); Won in AHL semifinals (2-0 vs. SPR); Won Calder Cup (4-1 vs. ROC)
Cape Breton Oilers	1993–94	AHL	80	32	35	13	–	77	4th in Atlantic	Lost in division quarterfinals (1-4 vs. STJ)
Edmonton Oilers	1994–95	NHL	35	12	20	3	–	(38)	5th in Pacific	(Fired)
Binghamton Rangers	1995–96	AHL	80	39	31	7	3	88	1st in South	Lost in division semifinals (1-3 vs. SYR)
Binghamton Rangers	1996–97	AHL	80	27	38	13	2	69	5th in Empire State	Lost in division semifinals (1-3 vs. STJ)
Guelph Storm	1997–98	OHL	66	42	18	6	–	90	1st in Central	Won in OHL quarterfinals (4-0 vs. SBY); Won in OHL semifinals (4-0 vs. PLY); Won J. Ross Robertson Cup (4-1 vs. OTT); Finished in 2nd place in round-robin at Memorial Cup (2-1); Won Memorial Cup semifinals (2-1 vs. SPO); Lost Memorial Cup finals (3-4 vs. POR)
Oshawa Generals	2000–01	OHL	68	20	36	7	5	52	5th in East	Missed playoffs
Oshawa Generals	2001–02	OHL	68	23	33	7	5	58	4th in East	Lost in conference quarterfinals (1-4 vs. BEL)
Oshawa Generals	2002–03	OHL	68	34	30	2	2	72	4th in East	Won in conference quarterfinals (4-3 vs. PBO); Lost in conference semifinals (2-4 vs. OTT)
Oshawa Generals	2003–04	OHL	68	30	29	8	1	69	3rd in East	Lost in conference quarterfinals (3-4 vs. MIS)
Belleville Bulls	2004–05	OHL	68	29	29	6	4	68	3rd in East	Lost in conference quarterfinals (1-4 vs. PBO)
Belleville Bulls	2005–06	OHL	68	32	28	–	8	72	3rd in East	Lost in conference quarterfinals (2-4 vs. BRA)
Belleville Bulls	2006–07	OHL	68	39	24	–	5	83	1st in East	Won in conference quarterfinals (4-1 vs. OTT); Won in conference semifinals (4-0 vs. OSH); Lost in conference finals (2-4 vs. SBY)
Belleville Bulls	2007–08	OHL	68	48	14	–	6	102	1st in East	Won in conference quarterfinals (4-1 vs. PBO); Won in conference semifinals (4-0 vs. BAR); Won in conference finals (4-1 vs. OSH); Lost J. Ross Robertson Cup finals (3-4 vs. KIT); Finished in second place in round-robin at Memorial Cup (2-1); Lost in Memorial Cup semifinals (0-9 vs. KIT)
Belleville Bulls	2008–09	OHL	68	47	17	–	4	98	1st in East	Won in conference quarterfinals (4-2 vs. SBY); Won in conference semifinals (4-1 vs. NIA); Lost in conference finals (2-4 vs. BRA)
Belleville Bulls	2009–10	OHL	68	20	40	–	8	48	5th in East	Missed playoffs
Belleville Bulls	2010–11	OHL	68	21	43	–	4	46	4th in East	Lost in conference quarterfinals (0-4 vs. MIS)
Belleville Bulls	2011–12	OHL	68	35	32	–	1	71	2nd in East	Lost in conference quarterfinals (2-4 vs. OTT)
Belleville Bulls	2012–13	OHL	68	44	16	–	8	96	1st in East	Won in conference quarterfinals (4-2 vs. MIS); Won in conference semifinals (4-0 vs. SBY); Lost in conference finals (3-4 vs. BAR)
Belleville Bulls	2013–14	OHL	68	23	38	–	7	53	4th in East	Missed playoffs
Belleville Bulls	2014–15	OHL	68	27	33	–	8	62	4th in East	Lost in conference quarterfinals (0-4 vs. BAR)
Hamilton Bulldogs	2015–16	OHL	68	25	35	–	8	58	5th in East	Missed playoffs
Guelph Storm	2017–18	OHL	68	30	29	–	9	69	4th in Midwest	Lost in conference quarterfinals (2-4 vs. KIT)
Guelph Storm	2018–19	OHL	68	40	18	–	10	90	2nd in Midwest	Won in conference quarterfinals (4-0 vs. KIT); Won in conference semifinals (4-3 vs. LDN); Won in conference finals (4-3 vs. SAG); Won J. Ross Robertson Cup (4-2 vs. OTT); Finished in second place in round-robin at Memorial Cup (2-1); Lost in Memorial Cup semifinals (4-6 vs. ROU)
Guelph Storm	2019–20	OHL	63	32	23	–	8	72	3rd in Midwest	Playoffs cancelled
Guelph Storm	2021–22	OHL	68	36	24	–	8	80	2nd in Midwest	Lost in conference quarterfinals (1-4 vs. SSM)
NHL totals		NHL	35	12	20	3	–	27	––	0 Stanley Cups (0-0, 0.000)
AHL totals		AHL	320	134	136	45	5	318	1 division title	1 Calder Cup (17-12, 0.586)
OHL totals		OHL	1599	774	655	51	92	1688	5 division titles	2 Robertson Cups (118-97, 0.549) 0 Memorial Cups (7-6, 0.538)

Preceded by Bill LaForge	Head coach of the Niagara Falls Thunder; 1989–92	Succeeded by Larry Marson
Preceded by Glen Sather	Head coach of the Edmonton Oilers; 1994–95	Succeeded by Ron Low
Preceded by E.J. McGuire	Head coach of the Guelph Storm; 1997–98	Succeeded by Geoff Ward
Preceded by John Goodwin	Head coach of the Oshawa Generals; 2000–04	Succeeded by Bob McGill
Preceded by James Boyd	Head coach of the Belleville Bulls; 2004–2015	Succeeded by Team moved to Hamilton
Preceded by Inaugural	Head coach of the Hamilton Bulldogs; 2015–2016	Succeeded by John Gruden
Preceded by Jarrod Skalde	Head coach of the Guelph Storm; 2017–2018	Incumbent
