= Belleville Bulls =

Canadian junior ice hockey team (1979–2015)

- City: Belleville, Ontario
- League: Ontario Hockey League
- Conference: Eastern
- Division: East
- Operated: 1981–2015
- Home arena: Yardmen Arena
- Colours: Black, red, gold, white

Franchise history
- 1981–2015: Belleville Bulls
- 2015–2023: Hamilton Bulldogs
- 2023–present: Brantford Bulldogs

The Belleville Bulls were a junior ice hockey team, founded in 1981 and based in Belleville, Ontario. The team played in the Eastern Division of the Eastern Conference of the Ontario Hockey League (OHL). The team relocated to Hamilton, Ontario, at the end of the 2014–15 OHL season.

== History ==
The Belleville Bulls started in 1979 as a Junior Tier II team in the OHA. In their second season in 1980–81, the Bulls won the Tier II title, defeating the Guelph Platers in the league finals. The Bulls then competed in the national championship for the Manitoba Centennial Trophy hosted in Halifax, Nova Scotia losing in the finals to the Prince Albert Raiders.

Original Bulls logo

Bulls uniforms through 2015

The Bulls played homes games at the Belleville Yardmen Arena, that is part of the Quinte Sports Centre including the Wally Dever Arena. The Bulls used a black, red, gold, and white colour scheme. Their original logo was a standing bull until 1998, replaced by an angry bull with a hockey stick in 1999.

On February 2, 1981, the OHL granted an expansion franchise to the city of Belleville and the ownership group of Dr. Robert L. Vaughan & Bob Dolan. Dr. Robert L. Vaughan remained an owner/co-owner of the team for over 20 years until he sold the team in 2004 to Gord Simmonds. Dr. Vaughan was awarded the Bill Long award in 1993 for distinguished service to the OHL.

In 1983, Belleville hosted the OHL All-Star Game, known then as the OHL Chrysler Cup.

The Bulls reached the OHL finals in 1986 versus a familiar foe from their Tier II days, the Guelph Platers. The Platers won the series in 6 games. In 1995 and 1996, the Bulls lost in the semi-finals to the Guelph Storm.

The 1999 season would be one for the memories when the Belleville Bulls would win it all. The Bulls defeated the London Knights 9–2 in game seven of the OHL championship series at the Yardmen Arena to win their first J. Ross Robertson Cup.

The Bulls competed in the 1999 Memorial Cup, hosted in Ottawa versus the Calgary Hitmen, Acadie–Bathurst Titan and Ottawa 67's. Belleville finished third, losing to Ottawa 4–2 in the semifinal.

=== 2004–05 ===
George Burnett was hired to become the head coach and general manager of the Belleville Bulls by a former high school friend, and team's new owner Gord Simmonds. Barclay Branch followed Burnett to Belleville and served as Burnett's assistant general manager and director of player personnel all eleven seasons. Burnett's assistant coach for his entire eleven season tenure in Belleville was Jake Grimes, a former player with the Bulls. Belleville native Jason Supryka was an assistant coach for eight of the eleven seasons, and a conditioning coach for the other three seasons. In Burnett's eleven seasons with the Belleville Bulls, he coached 748 games in the regular season and earned 365 wins, won four division titles, and one Memorial Cup appearance in 2008.

For the 2004–05 OHL season, Burnett took over a team that had finished last in the league in the previous season. His hiring was after the Bulls took part in the OHL draft, choosing John Hughes first overall. The Bulls were led by top scorer Marc Rancourt with 26 goals, 52 assists, and 78 points. Burnett also found two other twenty-goal scorers in Evan Brophey (25), Cody Thornton (23), and the emergence of two future NHL-ers in rookies Matt Beleskey and Shawn Matthias. Burnett led the club to a 29–29–6–4 record, earning 68 points, and seventh place in the eastern conference. In the playoffs, Belleville faced the second place Peterborough Petes. The Bulls lost the first three games by scores of 0–5, 2–3, and 1–5. Burnett and the Bulls pulled out a 4–3 overtime win in game four, but lost the fifth game by a score of 1–4.

=== 2005–06 ===
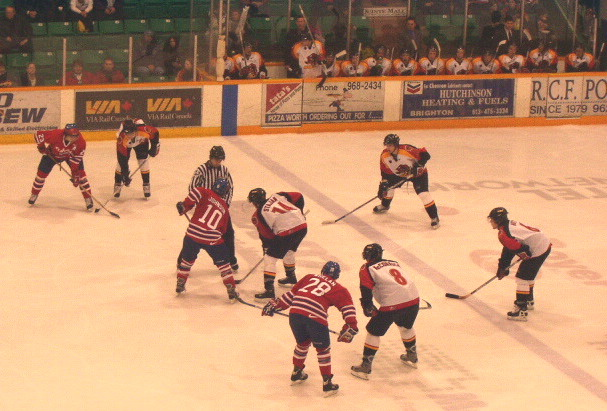
Belleville Bulls in action at home versus Oshawa Generals in 2006

Burnett took over the full drafting responsibilities for the 2005–06 OHL season, and drafted Bryan Cameron in the first round. Cameron scored 20 goals as a rookie, and John Hughes led the team in scoring with 28 goals, 54 assists, and 82 points. Also emerging as a rookie was sixth round draft pick P. K. Subban. Goaltender Kevin Lalande played in 50 games, winning 24. Burnett improved the Bulls record to 32–28–5–3, earning 72 points and seventh place in the conference, and facing the second place Brampton Battalion in the first round. Belleville split the first two games by 3–2 overtime scores, then two in a row by scores of 1–3 and 3–4 in overtime. After winning game five 3–2, Burnett and the Bulls lost game six 2–5 on home ice.

=== 2006–07 ===
The 2006–07 OHL season was Burnett's third season of rebuilding, and continued improvement on previous seasons. Burnett solidified the team with OHL draft picks Shawn Lalonde and Marc Cantin on defence, and goaltender Edward Pasquale. The offence was bolstered by acquiring Tyler Donati, whom Burnett previously drafted with the Oshawa Generals. Donati led the team with 54 goals, 75 assists, and 129 points, winning the Leo Lalonde Memorial Trophy as the league's best overage player. Rounding out the offence were Shawn Matthias with 38 goals, Bryan Cameron with 33 goals, and Matt Beleskey with 27 goals. Burnett had a strong debut from rookie Eric Tangradi, drafted in the previous season. Off the ice, Andrew Gibbons was the OHL's humanitarian winner of the Dan Snyder Memorial Trophy. Burnett led the Bulls to the east division title and the Leyden Trophy with a 39–24–0–5 record, earning 83 points and second place in the conference. In the playoffs, the Bulls faced seventh place Ottawa 67's in the first round. After losing the first game 3–4 in overtime, Burnett and the Bulls won four consecutive games by scores of 5–4, 3–0, 4–2, and 4–3 in overtime. Burnett's Bulls were well prepared for the second round, and swept the fourth place Oshawa Generals in four games by scores of 7–5, 5–2, 6–4, and 5–2. The Bulls faced the sixth place Sudbury Wolves in the third round, and eastern Conference finals, and Burnett coached his ninth straight playoff victory by a 3–2 score in game one. Four of the next five games went into overtime. The Wolves won game two in overtime, 2–3. Burnett pulled out a 2–1 overtime win in game three, only to see the Wolves win the next three games by scores of 2-3 in overtime, 1–4, and game six 3–4 in triple overtime.

=== 2007–08 ===
In the 2007–08 OHL season, Burnett had his most successful regular season as a coach in terms of most wins and points, and led the Bulls to the most wins and points in a season in franchise history. Burnett led the Bulls to a record of 48–14–4–2 and 102 points to win another Leyden Trophy, and finish first overall in the eastern conference. Burnett use Belleville's first round draft pick to select future NHLer Tyler Randell. Burnett's offence was built around Matt Beleskey who led the team with 41 goals, 49 assists, and 90 points. Burnett also had 20–goal seasons from Bryan Cameron (41 goals), Shawn Matthias (32 goals), Eric Tangradi (24 goals), and Keaton Turkiewicz (23 goals). Burnett made mid-season trades for forwards Jan Mursak and A.J. Perry, and veteran defender Nigel Williams. Goaltender Mike Murphy led the league with 36 wins, and a 2.24 GAA, winning the OHL Goaltender of the Year award. In the first round of the playoffs, Belleville faced the eighth place Peterborough Petes. Belleville won the first game 4–1, then lost game two 4–5 in overtime. Burnett's team won the next three games by scores of 4–3, 3–2 in overtime, and 7–1 to win the series in five games. Belleville swept the seventh place Barrie Colts in the second round, by scores of 7–2, 5–1, 2–1, and 3–2. In the third round, Burnett's Bulls faced the third place Oshawa Generals. Belleville won the first three games by scores of 3–2, 4–3, and 5–2. Burnett's team rebounded from a 1–2 loss in game four, with a resounding 11–0 victory in game five to win the eastern conference finals in five games, and win the Bobby Orr Trophy. Burnett reached the J. Ross Robertson Cup final for the second time in his coaching career, as the Bulls faced the first place team in the regular season, the Kitchener Rangers. Burnett's team lost the first three games by scores of 2–5, 2–5, and 3–5. Belleville won the next three games by scores of 5–4 in overtime, 2–1, and 6–3. Burnett was denied his second OHL championships, as Kitchener won the seventh game by a score of 4–1.

Burnett and the Bulls qualified for the 2008 Memorial Cup as the OHL representative, since the Kitchener Rangers were already guaranteed a berth as the host team. This would be the second Memorial Cup coaching appearance for Burnett, after coaching the Guelph Storm to the 1998 Memorial Cup final. Burnett and the Bulls faced the Spokane Chiefs in their first game, losing 4–5 in overtime. Belleville won their second game 6–3 versus the Gatineau Olympiques. Burnett's team faced the Kitchener Rangers in the final game of the round robin. Belleville prevailed with a 4–3 overtime win, with goaltender Mike Murphy making 54 saves. Burnett's team finished the round-robin in second place, and faced the Kitchener Rangers again in the semifinal. Burnett's team was overwhelmed in the rematch, losing 0–9, as the Bulls finished the tournament in third place.

=== 2008–09 ===
Burnett had a large group of returning players for the 2008–09 OHL season, and looked to repeat the success. Burnett drafted Stephen Silas in the first round to add to defence. Eric Tangradi led the scoring with 38 goals, 50 assists, and 88 points. Bryan Cameron also contributed 37 goals, 44 assists, and 81 points. P.K. Subban had 14 goals, 62 assists, and 76 points on defence and was a +47 in plus/minus rating. Goaltender Mike Murphy improved on the previous season by leading the league with 40 wins, and a 2.08 GAA, to win the OHL Goaltender of the Year award again, in addition to the Dave Pinkney Trophy for the team with the best goals against average, and the CHL Goaltender of the Year award. Burnett led the Bulls to the best record in the eastern conference at 47–17–2–2, earning 98 points and a third consecutive Leyden Trophy. Burnett and the Bulls faced the eighth place Sudbury Wolves in the first round. Belleville split the first two games at home by scores of 3–1 and 1–2, then won the next two games on the road 3–1 and 2–1. Sudbury won game five 6–2 on home ice, but Belleville closed out the series at home in six games with a 6–1 win. Burnett's team faced the sixth place Niagara IceDogs in the second round, and won the first two games in overtime, by scores of 4–3 and 5–4. After losing game three 0–2, Belleville had two straight 5–2 victories to win the series in five games. Burnett's team returned to the eastern conference finals for the third consecutive season, and would face the second place Brampton Battalion. Belleville lost the first two games by scores of 2–4 and 2–7, then split the next two games winning 6–2, then lost 3–4. Burnett coached a 3–2 double overtime win in game five to extend the series, but lost game six 4–7 on the road.

=== 2009–10 ===
Burnett began a rebuilding process for the Bulls in the 2009–10 OHL season. In the OHL draft, Burnett used his first pick to select local Quinte Red Devils goalie, Tyson Teichmann, followed up by centre Michael Curtis. Also drafted were Scott Simmonds (son of owner Gord Simmonds), and Malcolm Subban (brother of P. K. Subban). The Bulls struggled on offence, as the top two scorers were defencemen Shawn Lalonde with 13 goals, 43 assists, and 56 points; and Stephen Silas with 4 goals, 45 assists, and 49 points. Luke Judson scored 29 goals, and rookie Michael Curtis scored 19 goals. Burnett's team finished with a record of 20–40–2–6 and 48 points, placing last in the eastern conference and missed the playoffs.

=== 2010–11 ===
Burnett continued the rebuilding process with the 2010–11 OHL season, and used his second overall pick in the OHL entry draft to select future NHLer Brendan Gaunce. The offence was led by Andy Bathgate with 25 goals, 35 assists, and Luke Judson with 28 goals, and 28 assists. Malcolm Subban won 10 games in net with a 3.16 GAA Despite earning fewer points than the previous season, Burnett's team finished eighth place in the conference with a 21–43–0–4 record, and 46 points. Belleville was overmatched in the first round of the playoffs, being held to a single goal scored, and were swept by the first place Mississauga St. Michael's Majors, by scores of 1–4, 0–1, 0–2, and 0–4.

=== 2011–12 ===
Burnett achieved a couple coaching milestones in the early part of the 2011–12 OHL season. Burnett coached his 1000th OHL regular season game on October 13, 2011. Burnett recorded his 500th OHL coaching victory on December 2, 2011.

Burnett used his first round draft pick in the 2011–12 OHL season to select Jordan Subban, younger brother of P.K. and Malcolm Subban. Burnett had four twenty-goal scorers in Brendan Gaunce (28), Austen Brassard (27), Daniil Zharkov (23), and Adam Payerl (22). Goaltender Malcolm Subban had 25 wins and a 2.50 GAA. Burnett improved the team to a 35–32–1–0 record, earning 71 points. The seventh place Bulls faced the second place Ottawa 67's in the playoffs. The Bulls lost the first two games by scores of 2–3 in overtime, and 2–4. Burnett coached two consecutive 4–3 overtime victories to tie the series, but lost the next two games by scores of 2–5, and 1–2.

=== 2012–13 ===
Burnett had a lot of returning players for the 2012–13 OHL season, and added Niki Petti, Daniel De Sousa, Michael Cramarossa, and Chad Heffernan in the draft. Burnett's top line in included Joseph Cramarossa leading the team in scoring with 19 goals, 44 assists, and 63 points, and Brendan Gaunce with 33 goals, 27 assists, and 60 points. Daniil Zharkov added 25 goals to a team with a balanced offence. Burnett made key mid-season acquisitions to build the team, adding centreman and Belleville native Alan Quine, overage defenceman Jake Cardwell, and forward Tyler Graovac who would win the William Hanley Trophy as the league's most sportsmanlike player. Burnett's team conceded the second fewest goals in the league, and both goaltenders had excellent seasons. Malcolm Subban had 29 wins, and led the league with a 2.14 GAA. Backup goalie Charlie Graham had 15 wins, and a 2.59 GAA. Burnett led the Bulls to a 44–16–5–3 record, and 96 points to win another Leyden Trophy, and first place in the Eastern Conference. The Bulls faced the eighth place Mississauga Steelheads in the first round of the playoffs. Belleville won the first two games at home by scores of 8-1, and 4-1, then lost two games on the road by scores of 1-2, and 2-5. Returning home for game five, Burnett's team won 5-0, then finished the series with a 3–1 win in game six. In the second round, Belleville swept the fifth place Sudbury Wolves by scores of 6-3, 4-1, 4-0, and 5-0. Burnett had returned his team to the third round of the playoffs for the fourth time since taking over in Belleville, and then faced the second place Barrie Colts. Belleville won the first game 3-2, but lost three straight games by scores of 0-5, 4-5 in overtime, and 3-4 in overtime. Burnett coached two consecutive 3-1 victories to even the series, but lost game seven by a score of 1-3.

=== 2013–14 ===
Burnett began another rebuilding cycle for the 2013–14 OHL season, with a lot of trades made. Remi Elie was brought in from the London Knights, and led the team in scoring with 28 goals, 37 assists, and 65 points. Overage forward Cameron Brace came from the Owen Sound Attack and scored 27 goals. Jordan Subban led the defence with 12 goals, and 30 assists. OHL entry draft picks Justin Lemcke, and Adam Laishram, earned the most playing time for 16-year-olds. Charlie Graham emerged as the number one goalie playing 53 games. Scott Simmonds was awarded the Dan Snyder Memorial Trophy as the OHL Humanitarian recipient. The Bulls finished with a record of 23–38–4–3 record, earning 53 points. Burnett's team narrowly missed the playoffs, just one point out of eighth place.

=== 2014–15 ===
Burnett continued to build the Bulls for the 2014–15 OHL season. Defenceman Jordan Subban led the team in scoring with 25 goals, 27 assists, and 52 points. In the OHL draft, Burnett picked up centreman Brandon Saigeon, and defenceman Cole Candella. Goaltender Charlie Graham played 51 games, earning 23 wins. Burnett recorded his 600th OHL coaching victory on December 13, 2014. Burnett improved the team's record to 27–33–3–5, earning 62 points and seventh place. Burnett and the Bulls entered the playoffs knowing it would be the final chance for success in Belleville. The Bulls faced the second place Barrie Colts in the first round, and were swept in four games, by scores of 2-3, 2-8, 1-2 in overtime, and 2-4.

On March 12, 2015, Michael Andlauer acquired the Belleville Bulls, and moved them to FirstOntario Centre in Hamilton, Ontario for the 2015–16 season, becoming the Hamilton Bulldogs.

== Championships ==
Leyden Trophy East Division regular season champions

- 2000–2001
- 2001–2002
- 2006–2007
- 2007–2008
- 2008–2009
- 2012–2013

Bobby Orr Trophy Eastern Conference champions

- 1998–1999
- 2007–2008

J. Ross Robertson Cup championships

- 1985–1986 — Lost to Guelph Platers in OHL Final
- 1998–1999 — OHL Champions vs. London Knights
- 2007–2008 — Lost to Kitchener Rangers in OHL Final

Memorial Cup appearances

- 1999 OHL champions in Ottawa, Ontario
- 2008 OHL representative in Kitchener, Ontario

== Coaches ==
Larry Mavety coached the Belleville Bulls for 14 seasons. He is third only to Brian Kilrea and Dale Hunter for amount of time coached with an OHL team.

Lou Crawford was groomed by Mavety to replace him behind the Bulls' bench. Lou Crawford is the brother of former NHL head coach Marc Crawford, who was also the head coach of the St. John's Maple Leafs (now the Toronto Marlies) in the American Hockey League, which played in St. John's, Newfoundland and Labrador. Their father, Floyd Crawford, was team captain of the 1959 World Champion Belleville McFarlands.

Former head coaches Lou Crawford and Shawn MacKenzie both had brief NHL careers. George Burnett briefly coached with the Edmonton Oilers. James Boyd is the only former Bulls player to later coach the Belleville team.

List of head coaches

(Multiple years in parentheses)

- 1979–1988 Larry Mavety (16)
- 1988–1990 Danny Flynn (2)
- 1990 playoffs – Shawn MacKenzie
- 1990–1997 Larry Mavety (16)
- 1997–2000 Lou Crawford (3)
- 2000–2003 Jim Hulton (3)
- 2003–2004 James Boyd
- 2004–2015 George Burnett (11)

== Players ==
=== Award winners ===
CHL Humanitarian of the Year Award

- 1995–1996 Craig Mills

Eddie Powers Memorial Trophy
OHL Top Point Scorer.

- 1984–85 Dave MacLean
- 2000–01 Kyle Wellwood
- 2001–02 Nathan Robinson

Jim Mahon Memorial Trophy
OHL Top Scoring Right Winger.

- 1984–85 Dave MacLean
- 1991–92 Darren McCarty
- 2000–01 Branko Radivojevic
- 2001–02 Mike Renzi

OHL Goaltender of the Year
Voted best goaltender in the OHL.

- 1989–90 Jeff Fife
- 2007–08 Mike Murphy
- 2008–09 Mike Murphy

F.W. "Dinty" Moore Trophy
Best rookie goals against average.

- 1982–83 Dan Burrows
- 1985–86 Paul Henriques

Wayne Gretzky 99 Award
Playoffs MVP

- 1999 Justin Papineau

Dan Snyder Memorial Trophy
Humanitarian of the year.

- 1995–96 Craig Mills
- 2001–02 David Silverstone
- 2002–03 Michael Mole
- 2006–07 Andrew Gibbons

William Hanley Trophy
Most sportsmanlike player.

- 1985–86 Jason Lafreniere
- 2002–03 Kyle Wellwood

Leo Lalonde Memorial Trophy
Overage player of the year.

- 1984–85 Dunc MacIntyre
- 1998–99 Ryan Ready
- 2000–01 Randy Rowe
- 2006–07 Tyler Donati

Bobby Smith Trophy
Scholastic player of the year.

- 1984–85 Craig Billington

Jack Ferguson Award
First overall draft pick.

- 1981 Dan Quinn
- 2004 John Hughes

=== Captains ===
- 1981–1982 Ben Kelly
- 1982–1985 Dunc MacIntyre (3)
- 1985–1986 Daran Moxam (1)
- 1986–1988 Brian Chapman (2)
- 1988–1989 Bryan Marchment
- 1989–1990 Greg Bignell
- 1990–1991 John Parco
- 1991–1992 Darren McCarty
- 1992–1993 Chris Clancy
- 1993–1994 Jarrett Reid & Mark Donahue
- 1994–1996 Craig Mills (2)
- 1996–1997 Daniel Cleary
- 1997–1999 Ryan Ready (2)
- 1999–2000 Justin Papineau
- 2000–2001 Nick Policelli
- 2001–2002 Matt Coughlin
- 2002–2003 Cody McCormick
- 2003–2004 Andrew Brown
- 2004–2005 Marc Rancourt
- 2005–2007 Andrew Gibbons (2)
- 2007–2008 Matt Beleskey
- 2008–2009 Eric Tangradi
- 2009–2012 Luke Judson (3)
- 2012–2014 Brendan Gaunce (2)
- 2014–2015 Jake Marchment
- 2014–2015 Brett Welychka

=== Retired numbers ===
- 15 — Dunc MacIntyre

=== NHL alumni ===
List of Bulls alumni who played in the National Hockey League (NHL):

- Steve Bancroft
- Matt Beleskey
- Radim Bicanek
- Craig Billington
- Evan Brophey
- Kevin Brown
- Sean Brown
- Brian Chapman
- Jonathan Cheechoo
- Tony Cimellaro
- David Clarkson
- Daniel Cleary
- Brandon Convery
- Craig Coxe
- Troy Crowder
- Andre Deveaux
- Doug Doull
- Stan Drulia
- Brendan Gaunce
- Doug Gilmour
- Tyler Graovac
- Dan Gratton
- Brent Gretzky
- Philipp Grubauer
- David Haas
- Mike Hartman
- Todd Hawkins
- Bryan Helmer
- Al Iafrate
- Jason Lafreniere
- Shawn Lalonde
- Kevin MacDonald
- Bryan Marchment
- Brandon Mashinter
- Shawn Matthias
- Darren McCarty
- Cody McCormick
- Chris McRae
- Marty McSorley
- Branislav Mezei
- Craig Mills
- Mike Murphy
- Jan Mursak
- Kris Newbury
- Nick Palmieri
- Darren Pang
- Richard Panik
- Justin Papineau
- Richard Park
- Adam Payerl
- Rob Pearson
- Matt Pelech
- John Purves
- Alan Quine
- Dan Quinn
- Branko Radivojevic
- Ryan Ready
- Keith Redmond
- Nathan Robinson
- Jarrod Skalde
- Jason Spezza
- Matt Stajan
- Malcolm Subban
- P. K. Subban
- Eric Tangradi
- Scott Thornton
- David Tomášek
- Nikos Tselios
- Mike Vellucci
- Kyle Wellwood
- Derek Wilkinson
- Darryl Williams

== Season-by-season results ==
- Ontario Provincial Junior Hockey League (1979–1981):
- Ontario Hockey League (1981–2015):

Legend: GP = Games played, W = Wins, L = Losses, T = Ties, OTL = Overtime losses, SL = Shoot-out losses, Pts = Points, GF = Goals for, GA = Goals against

League champions	League finalists

Season	GP	W	L	T	OTL	SL	Pts	Win %	GF	GA	Standing	Playoffs
1979–80	44	24	18	2	—	—	50	0.568	235	191	5th OPJHL	Lost quarterfinal (Aurora Tigers) 4–3
1980–81	44	35	7	2	—	—	72	0.818	273	138	1st OPJHL	Won quarterfinal (Markham Waxers) 4–1; Won semifinal (North Bay Trappers) 4–0; Won OPJHL championship (Guelph Platers) 4–1; Won OHA championship (Onaping Falls Huskies) 3–0; Won Central Canada semifinal (Thunder Bay Kings) 4–1; Won Central Canada final (Gloucester Rangers) 4–3; 2nd place in Centennial Cup round-robin Lost Centennial Cup final (Prince Albert Raiders) 6–2
1981–82	68	24	42	2	—	—	50	0.368	280	326	7th Leyden	Did not qualify
1982–83	70	34	36	0	—	—	68	0.486	342	332	6th Leyden	Lost divisional quarterfinal (Oshawa Generals) 7–1
1983–84	70	33	37	0	—	—	66	0.471	319	304	5th Leyden	Lost divisional quarterfinal (Oshawa Generals) 6–0
1984–85	66	42	24	0	—	—	84	0.636	390	278	2nd Leyden	Won divisional quarterfinal (Oshawa Generals) 8–2; Won divisional semifinal (Cornwall Royals 6–2; Lost divisional final (Peterborough Petes) 9–1
1985–86	66	37	27	2	—	—	76	0.576	305	268	2nd Leyden	Won divisional quarterfinal (Cornwall Royals) 9–3; Tied for 1st place divisional semifinal round-robin Won divisional final (Peterborough Petes) 9–7; Lost OHL championship (Guelph Platers) 8–4
1986–87	66	26	39	1	—	—	53	0.402	292	347	5th Leyden	Lost divisional quarterfinal (Kingston Canadians) 4–2
1987–88	66	32	30	4	—	—	68	0.515	297	275	4th Leyden	Lost divisional quarterfinal (Cornwall Royals) 4–2
1988–89	66	27	35	4	—	—	58	0.439	292	322	6th Leyden	Lost divisional quarterfinal (Peterborough Petes) 4–1
1989–90	66	36	26	4	—	—	76	0.576	301	247	5th Leyden	Won divisional quarterfinal (Kingston Frontenacs) 4–3; Lost divisional semifinal (Peterborough Petes) 4–0
1990–91	66	38	21	7	—	—	83	0.629	324	280	3rd Leyden	Lost divisional quarterfinal (Ottawa 67's) 4–2
1991–92	66	27	27	12	—	—	66	0.500	314	293	6th Leyden	Lost divisional quarterfinal (North Bay Centennials) 4–1
1992–93	66	21	34	11	—	—	53	0.402	280	315	6th Leyden	Lost divisional quarterfinal (Oshawa Generals) 4–3
1993–94	66	32	28	6	—	—	70	0.530	303	264	4th Leyden	Won divisional quarterfinal (Kingston Frontenacs) 4–2; Lost divisional semifinals (North Bay Centennials) 4–2
1994–95	66	32	31	3	—	—	67	0.508	295	287	4th East	Won first round (North Bay Centennials) 4–2; Won quarterfinal (Kingston Frontenacs) 4–2; Lost semifinal (Guelph Storm) 4–0
1995–96	66	35	26	5	—	—	75	0.568	300	250	3rd East	Won first round (Oshawa Generals) 4–1; Won quarterfinal (Ottawa 67's) 4–0; Lost semifinal (Guelph Storm) 4–1
1996–97	66	22	37	7	—	—	51	0.386	235	278	5th East	Lost first round (Ottawa 67's) 4–2
1997–98	66	41	22	3	—	—	85	0.644	315	239	2nd East	Won first round (Peterborough Petes) 4–2; Lost quarterfinal (Plymouth Whalers) 4–2
1998–99	68	39	22	7	—	—	85	0.644	334	246	2nd East	Won conference quarterfinal (Sudbury Wolves) 4–0; Won conference semifinal (Ottawa 67's) 4–1; Won conference final (Oshawa Generals) 4–1; Won OHL championship (London Knights) 4–3; 3rd place in Memorial Cup round-robin Lost in Memorial Cup semifinals (Ottawa 67's) 4–2
1999–2000	68	44	22	4	0	—	88	0.662	319	227	2nd East	Won conference quarterfinal (Peterborough Petes) 4–1; Won conference semifinal (Ottawa 67's) 4–2; Lost conference final (Barrie Colts) 4–1
2000–01	68	37	23	5	3	—	82	0.603	275	224	1st East	Won conference quarterfinal (Kingston Frontenacs) 4–0; Lost conference semifinal (Ottawa 67's) 4–2
2001–02	68	39	23	4	2	—	84	0.618	279	218	1st East	Won conference quarterfinal (Oshawa Generals) 4–1; Lost conference semifinal (Barrie Colts) 4–2
2002–03	68	33	27	6	2	—	74	0.544	195	200	3rd East	Lost conference quarterfinal (Toronto St. Michael's Majors) 4–3
2003–04	68	15	44	8	1	—	39	0.287	172	279	5th East	Did not qualify
2004–05	68	29	29	6	4	—	68	0.500	176	208	3rd East	Lost conference quarterfinal (Peterborough Petes) 4–1
2005–06	68	32	28	—	5	3	72	0.529	202	225	3rd East	Lost conference quarterfinal (Brampton Battalion) 4–2
2006–07	68	39	24	—	0	5	83	0.610	260	227	1st East	Won conference quarterfinal (Ottawa 67's) 4–1; Won conference semifinal (Oshawa Generals) 4–0; Lost conference final (Sudbury Wolves) 4–2
2007–08	68	48	14	—	4	2	102	0.750	280	175	1st East	Won conference quarterfinal (Peterborough Petes) 4–1; Won conference semifinal (Barrie Colts) 4–0; Won conference final (Oshawa Generals) 4–1; Lost OHL championship (Kitchener Rangers) 4–3; 2nd place in Memorial Cup round-robin Lost Memorial Cup semifinal (Kitchener Rangers) 9–0
2008–09	68	47	17	—	2	2	98	0.721	258	176	1st East	Won conference quarterfinal (Sudbury Wolves) 4–2; Won conference semifinal (Niagara IceDogs) 4–1; Lost conference final (Brampton Battalion) 4–2
2009–10	68	20	40	—	2	6	48	0.353	189	263	5th East	Did not qualify
2010–11	68	21	43	—	0	4	46	0.338	175	271	4th East	Lost conference quarterfinal (Mississauga St. Michael's Majors) 4–0
2011–12	68	35	32	—	1	0	71	0.522	200	221	2nd East	Lost conference quarterfinal (Ottawa 67's) 4–2
2012–13	68	44	16	—	5	3	96	0.706	228	167	1st East	Won conference quarterfinal (Mississauga Steelheads) 4–2; Won conference semifinal (Sudbury Wolves) 4–0; Lost conference final (Barrie Colts) 4–3
2013–14	68	23	38	—	4	3	53	0.390	206	285	4th East	Did not qualify
2014–15	68	27	33	—	3	5	62	0.456	203	246	4th East	Lost conference quarterfinal (Barrie Colts) 4–0

== See also ==
- List of ice hockey teams in Ontario
