= Hamilton Bulldogs =

Hamilton Bulldogs may refer to:

- Hamilton Bulldogs (AHL), a team in the American Hockey League from 1996 to 2015
- Hamilton Bulldogs (OHL), a team in the Ontario Hockey League from 2016 to 2023
