= Danny Markov =

Russian ice hockey player (born 1976)

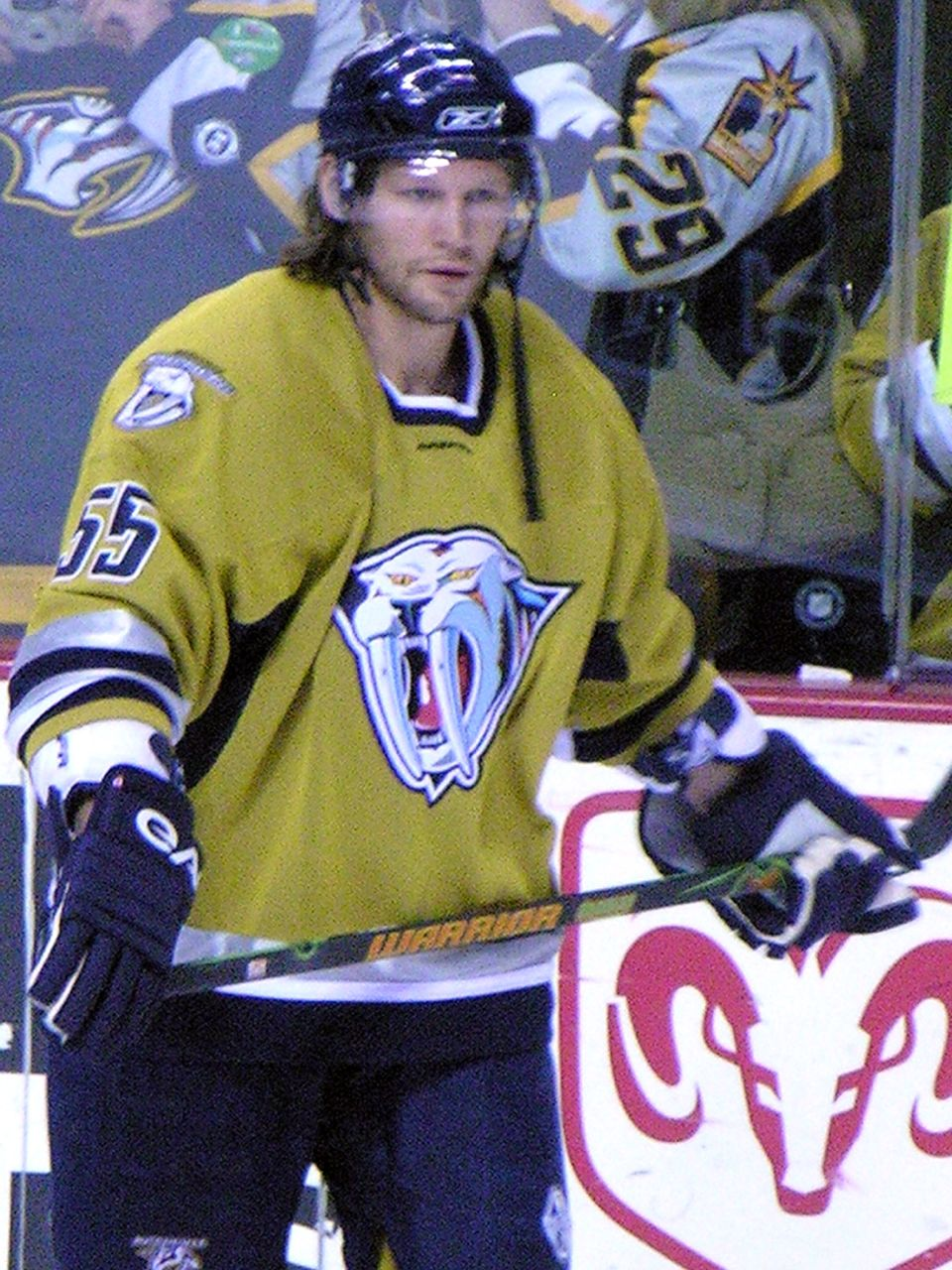
- Markov with the Nashville Predators in 2005
- Born: 30 July 1976 (age 49) Moscow, Russian SFSR, Soviet Union
- Height: 6 ft 1 in (185 cm)
- Weight: 186 lb (84 kg; 13 st 4 lb)
- Position: Defence
- Shot: Left
- Played for: Spartak Moscow; Toronto Maple Leafs; Phoenix Coyotes; Carolina Hurricanes; Philadelphia Flyers; Nashville Predators; Detroit Red Wings; Dynamo Moscow; Vityaz Chekhov; SKA St. Petersburg; Metallurg Magnitogorsk; CSKA Moscow
- National team: Russia
- NHL draft: 223rd overall, 1995; Toronto Maple Leafs
- Playing career: 1993–2014

Daniil Yevgenyevich Markov (Russian: Даниил Евгеньевич Марков; born 30 July 1976) is a Russian former professional ice hockey defenceman who played a nine-year career in the National Hockey League. He also played 11 seasons in the top tier Russian leagues.

== Playing career ==
As a youth, Markov played in the 1990 Quebec International Pee-Wee Hockey Tournament with a minor ice hockey team from Moscow.

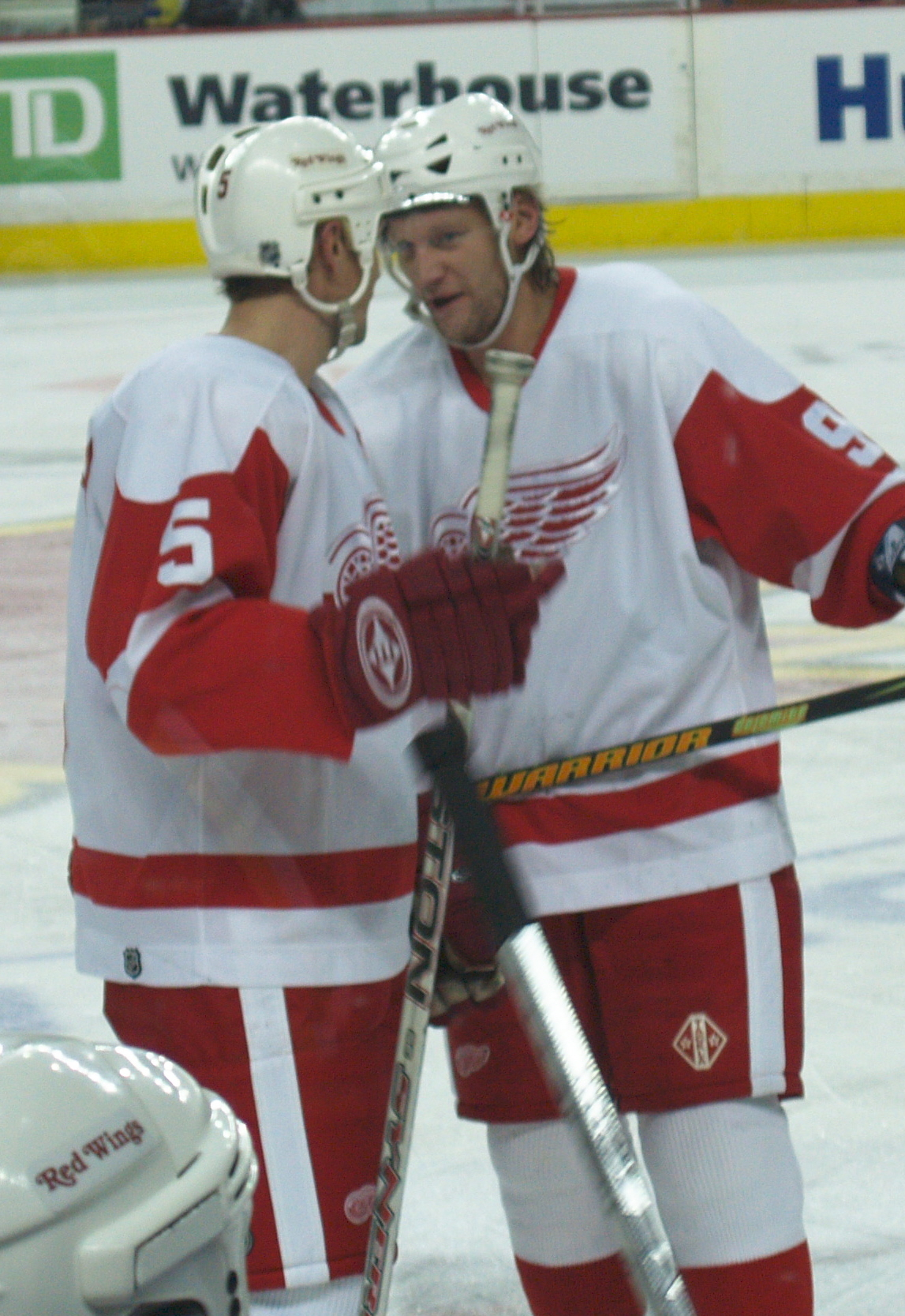
Markov, alongside Nicklas Lidström, with the Red Wings.

Markov began his career in 1993, playing for HC Spartak Moscow in Russia. The Toronto Maple Leafs of the NHL drafted him in the 9th round of the 1995 NHL entry draft. However, partway through the 1996–97 season, he left Moscow and began playing for the Maple Leafs' farm team, the St. John's Maple Leafs. He made the jump to the NHL at the end of the 1997–98 season.

After four seasons in Toronto, he was traded to the Phoenix Coyotes for Travis Green, Robert Reichel, and Craig Mills. He played two seasons for the Coyotes before joining the Carolina Hurricanes for the 2003–04 season; once again, he was traded to the Philadelphia Flyers for forward Justin Williams partway through the season. On March 5, 2004, he scored the 10,000th goal in Flyers history against Patrick Lalime and the Ottawa Senators during a 5–3 win at the Wachovia Center.

In the time leading up to the 2005–06, the Flyers found themselves in potential trouble with the new salary cap and needed to unload some salary. Thus, they traded Markov to the Nashville Predators for a third round pick in the 2006 NHL entry draft. On 26 July 2006, the Detroit Red Wings signed Markov as a free agent. Markov then signed a two-year contract with Dynamo Moscow in Russia.

Markov is noted for his toughness. One game which Markov played for the Leafs involved him receiving an injury below his eye which required stitches. He took the stitches without anesthetic in order to keep playing. Markov is also well known for returning to Jaromír Jágr his infamous "goal-salute" after the Maple Leafs knocked the Penguins out of the 1999 NHL playoffs during an Eastern Conference Semi-Finals overtime win.

== Career statistics ==
=== Regular season and playoffs ===
			Regular season					Playoffs
Season	Team	League	GP	G	A	Pts	PIM	GP	G	A	Pts	PIM
1993–94	Spartak Moscow	IHL	13	1	0	1	6	1	0	0	0	0
1994–95	Spartak Moscow	IHL	39	0	1	1	36	—	—	—	—	—
1995–96	Spartak Moscow	RSL	38	2	0	2	12	2	0	0	0	2
1996–97	Spartak Moscow	RSL	39	3	6	9	41	—	—	—	—	—
1996–97	St. John's Maple Leafs	AHL	10	2	4	6	18	11	2	6	8	14
1997–98	St. John's Maple Leafs	AHL	52	3	23	26	124	2	0	1	1	0
1997–98	Toronto Maple Leafs	NHL	25	2	5	7	28	—	—	—	—	—
1998–99	Toronto Maple Leafs	NHL	57	4	8	12	47	17	0	6	6	18
1999–2000	Toronto Maple Leafs	NHL	59	0	10	10	28	12	0	3	3	10
2000–01	Toronto Maple Leafs	NHL	59	3	13	16	34	11	1	1	2	12
2001–02	Phoenix Coyotes	NHL	72	6	30	36	67	—	—	—	—	—
2002–03	Phoenix Coyotes	NHL	64	4	16	20	36	—	—	—	—	—
2003–04	Carolina Hurricanes	NHL	44	4	10	14	37	—	—	—	—	—
2003–04	Philadelphia Flyers	NHL	34	2	3	5	58	18	1	2	3	25
2004–05	Vityaz Chekhov	RUS II	26	5	7	12	16	12	0	3	3	6
2005–06	Nashville Predators	NHL	58	0	11	11	62	5	0	0	0	6
2006–07	Detroit Red Wings	NHL	66	4	12	16	59	18	0	0	0	13
2007–08	Dynamo Moscow	RSL	29	0	4	4	74	9	2	1	3	12
2008–09	Dynamo Moscow	KHL	24	3	4	7	12	10	1	4	5	22
2009–10	Dynamo Moscow	KHL	42	5	9	14	30	3	0	0	0	4
2010–11	Vityaz Chekhov	KHL	45	5	8	13	28	—	—	—	—	—
2010–11	SKA St. Petersburg	KHL	4	0	3	3	2	10	1	3	4	8
2011–12	Vityaz Chekhov	KHL	27	0	5	5	39	—	—	—	—	—
2011–12	Metallurg Magnitogorsk	KHL	10	0	5	5	8	12	3	1	4	4
2012–13	Vityaz Chekhov	KHL	43	1	1	2	98	—	—	—	—	—
2012–13	CSKA Moscow	KHL	4	0	0	0	4	9	0	1	1	0
2013–14	CSKA Moscow	KHL	12	1	1	2	0	—	—	—	—	—
NHL totals			538	29	118	147	456	81	2	12	14	84
RSL totals			106	5	10	15	127	11	2	1	3	14
KHL totals			211	15	36	51	221	44	5	9	14	38

Medal record

Representing Russia

Men's ice hockey
Bronze medal – third place	2002 Salt Lake City	

=== International ===
Year	Team	Event	Result	GP	G	A	Pts	PIM
1998	Russia	WC	5th	4	0	0	0	0
2002	Russia	OG	3rd place, bronze medalist(s)	5	0	1	1	0
2006	Russia	OG	4th	8	0	2	2	4
2008	Russia	WC	1st place, gold medalist(s)	8	0	1	1	2
Senior totals				25	0	4	4	6
