= Craig Mills =

Canadian professional ice hockey player (born 1976)

- Born: August 27, 1976 (age 49) Toronto, Ontario, Canada
- Height: 6 ft 0 in (183 cm)
- Weight: 198 lb (90 kg; 14 st 2 lb)
- Position: Right wing
- Shot: Right
- Played for: Winnipeg Jets; Chicago Blackhawks; Lokomotiv Yaroslavl; Brûleurs de Loups
- NHL draft: 108th overall, 1994; Winnipeg Jets
- Playing career: 1996–2006

Craig Mills (born August 27, 1976) is a Canadian former ice hockey winger who played for the Winnipeg Jets and Chicago Blackhawks of the National Hockey League between 1996 and 1999. He is the son of Ontario politician Dennis Mills, and was born in Toronto, Ontario.

== Playing career ==
As a youth, Mills played in the 1990 Quebec International Pee-Wee Hockey Tournament with a minor ice hockey team from North York.

Mills was the recipient of the OHL Humanitarian of the Year and the CHL Humanitarian of the Year Award in 1996. He was also part of Canada's gold medal-winning hockey team in the 1996 World Junior Ice Hockey Championships. He captained the Belleville Bulls of the OHL from 1994 to 1996.

Mills was drafted 108th overall by the Jets in the 1994 NHL entry draft. He played 31 career NHL games, with zero goals and five assists. On August 16, 1996, Mills was traded by the Phoenix Coyotes with Alexei Zhamnov and a first-round draft choice (Ty Jones) to the Chicago Blackhawks in exchange for Jeremy Roenick. On June 12, 2001, Mills was traded by the Phoenix Coyotes again with Robert Reichel and Travis Green to the Toronto Maple Leafs in exchange for Daniil Markov.

== Career statistics ==
=== Regular season and playoffs ===
			Regular season					Playoffs
Season	Team	League	GP	G	A	Pts	PIM	GP	G	A	Pts	PIM
1992–93	St. Michael's Buzzers	MetJAHL	44	9	21	30	42	15	1	6	7	8
1993–94	Belleville Bulls	OHL	63	15	18	33	88	12	2	1	3	11
1994–95	Belleville Bulls	OHL	62	39	41	80	104	13	7	9	16	8
1995–96	Belleville Bulls	OHL	48	10	19	29	113	14	4	5	9	32
1995–96	Springfield Falcons	AHL	—	—	—	—	—	2	0	0	0	0
1995–96	Winnipeg Jets	NHL	4	0	2	2	0	1	0	0	0	0
1996–97	Indianapolis Ice	IHL	80	12	7	19	199	4	0	0	0	4
1997–98	Chicago Blackhawks	NHL	20	0	3	3	34	—	—	—	—	—
1997–98	Indianapolis Ice	IHL	42	8	11	19	119	5	0	0	0	27
1998–99	Chicago Blackhawks	NHL	7	0	0	0	2	—	—	—	—	—
1998–99	Portland Pirates	AHL	48	7	11	18	59	—	—	—	—	—
1998–99	Indianapolis Ice	IHL	12	2	3	5	14	6	1	0	1	5
1999–00	Springfield Falcons	AHL	78	10	13	23	151	5	2	1	3	6
2000–01	Springfield Falcons	AHL	64	8	5	13	131	—	—	—	—	—
2001–02	St. John's Maple Leafs	AHL	74	10	21	31	137	11	3	3	6	22
2002–03	St. John's Maple Leafs	AHL	65	10	16	26	121	—	—	—	—	—
2004–05	Lokomotiv Yaroslavl	RSL	1	0	0	0	12	—	—	—	—	—
2004–05	Lokomotiv Yaroslavl-2	RUS-3	2	0	1	1	4	—	—	—	—	—
2002–03	Nybro Vikings	SWE-2	22	6	4	10	45	—	—	—	—	—
2005–06	Brûleurs de Loups	FRA	25	9	8	17	67	7	3	0	3	10
AHL totals			329	45	66	111	599	18	5	4	9	28
NHL totals			31	0	5	5	36	1	0	0	0	0

=== International ===
Year	Team	Event	GP	G	A	Pts	PIM
1996	Canada	WJC	6	0	0	0	4
Junior totals			6	0	0	0	4
