= Craig Billington =

Canadian ice hockey player (born 1966)

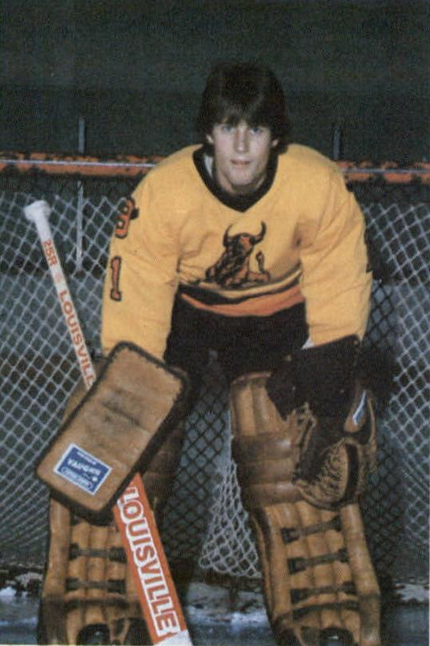
- Billington in 1984 photo for Belleville Bulls
- Born: September 11, 1966 (age 60) London, Ontario, Canada
- Height: 5 ft 10 in (178 cm)
- Weight: 170 lb (77 kg; 12 st 2 lb)
- Position: Goaltender
- Caught: Left
- Played for: New Jersey Devils; Ottawa Senators; Boston Bruins; Colorado Avalanche; Washington Capitals
- National team: Canada
- NHL draft: 23rd overall, 1984; New Jersey Devils
- Playing career: 1985–2003

Craig Richard Billington (born September 11, 1966) is a Canadian former professional ice hockey goaltender. He played with several teams in a 15-year National Hockey League (NHL) career, always known as "Biller," and serves as an assistant general manager for the Colorado Avalanche, and the general manager of the American Hockey League (AHL)'s Colorado Eagles.

== Playing career ==
=== Pre-Junior ===
As a youth, Billington played in the 1979 Quebec International Pee-Wee Hockey Tournament with a minor ice hockey team from Stoneybrook in London, Ontario.

He played high school hockey at A.B. Lucas SS. He played junior B hockey for the London Chester Pegg Diamonds in the Western Junior B. OHA. He was drafted by the Belleville Bulls in the fourth round, 51st overall in the 1983 OHL Priority Draft.

=== Junior hockey ===
==== Belleville Bulls (1983–1986) ====
Billington joined the Belleville Bulls of the Ontario Hockey League for the 1983–84 season. In his rookie season, Billington appeared in 44 games, earning a record of 20–19–0 with a 4.16 GAA. In one post-season game, Billington had a GAA of 6.00 as the Bulls lost to the Oshawa Generals in the Leyden Division quarter-finals.

Billington returned to Belleville for the 1984–85 season. In 47 games, Billington earned a record of 26–19–0 with a 4.25 GAA, helping the Bulls finish second in the Leyden Division. In the playoffs, Billington posted a GAA of 2.71 in 14 games, as the Bulls lost to the Peterborough Petes in the Leyden Division finals. Following the season, Billington was named the winner of the Bobby Smith Trophy, awarded to the OHL Scholastic Player of the Year. Billington was also named to the OHL First All-Star Team.

In 1985–86, Billington returned to the Bulls late in the season after spending most of the year with the New Jersey Devils of the NHL. In three regular season games, Billington had a 2–1–0 record with a 3.67 GAA and a .893 save percentage. Billington's return to the Bulls provided a boost in the post-season, as in 20 games, Billington posted a GAA of 3.60, leading Belleville to the J. Ross Robertson Cup finals. In the final round, the Bulls lost four games to two to the Guelph Platers.

=== Professional career ===
==== New Jersey Devils (1984–1993) ====
Billington was drafted by the New Jersey Devils in the second round, 23rd overall at the 1984 NHL entry draft held at the Montreal Forum in Montreal, Quebec. Billington was the first goaltender selected in the draft.

The Devils assigned Billington to his junior club, the Belleville Bulls of the Ontario Hockey League for the 1984–85 season.

Billington began the 1985–86 season with New Jersey. On October 26, 1985, Billington made his NHL debut, as he made 23 saves in a 5–2 victory over the Los Angeles Kings. In 18 games with the Devils during the season, Billington had a 4–9–1 record with a 5.14 GAA and a .840 save percentage. Late in the season, Billington was assigned to his junior club in Belleville in an effort to get him more playing time.

Billington split the 1986–87 season between the Devils and their American Hockey League affiliate, the Maine Mariners. In 20 games with the Mariners during the 1986–87 season, Billington earned a record of 9–7–2 with a 3.65 GAA and a .873 save percentage. With the Devils, Billington played in 22 games, posting a record of 4–13–2 with a 4.79 GAA and a .844 save percentage.

In 1987–88, the Devils assigned Billington to their new AHL affiliate, the Utica Devils. In 59 games with Utica, Billington had a 22–27–8 record with a 3.67 GAA and a .880 save percentage.

Billington spent a majority of the 1988–89 season with Utica of the AHL. In 41 games, Billington had a record of 17–18–6 with a 3.70 GAA and a .872 save percentage with the club. In four post-season games, Billington posted a 1–3 record with a 4.91 GAA. Billington briefly appeared with New Jersey during the 1988–89 season. In three games with the Devils, Billington earned a record of 1–1–0 with a 4.71 GAA and a .830 save percentage.

Billington remained with Utica for the 1989–90 season. In 38 games, Billington earned a 20–13–1 record with a 3.97 GAA and a .870 save percentage. Billington did not appear in any post-season games for Utica in the 1990 playoffs.

In 1990–91, the Devils allowed Billington to play with the Canadian National Team. In 34 games with Team Canada, Billington posted a 17–14–2 record with a 3.15 GAA.

Billington returned to New Jersey in 1991–92. He remained in the NHL for the entire season for the first time in his career. On December 28, 1991, Billington stopped all 26 shots he faced in a 3–0 win over the Buffalo Sabres for his first career shutout. In a back-up role, Billington earned a 13–7–1 record with a team best 3.04 GAA and .892 save percentage. Billington also led the Devils with two shutouts. In the 1992 NHL playoffs, Billington did not see any playing time.

In the 1992–93 season, Billington split his playing time with Chris Terreri. In 42 games, Billington had a team high 21 victories, as he earned a record of 21–16–4 with a 3.67 GAA and a .876 save percentage. On April 20, 1993, Billington played in his first career NHL playoff game, as he made three saves on four shots in relief of Terreri in a 7–0 loss to the Pittsburgh Penguins. On April 22, Billington made his first career NHL playoff start, as he stopped 31 shots in a 4–3 loss to the Penguins. Overall, in two playoff games, Billington had a 0–1 record with a 3.83 GAA and a .872 save percentage.

On June 20, 1993, the Devils traded Billington, Troy Mallette, and a fourth round draft pick at the 1993 NHL entry draft to the Ottawa Senators for Peter Sidorkiewicz and future considerations.

==== Ottawa Senators (1993–1995) ====
Billington was named the starting goaltender for the Ottawa Senators after being acquired by the club during the off-season. On October 6, 1993, Billington made his Senators debut, making 26 saves in a 5–5 tie with the Quebec Nordiques. After starting the season 0–4–1, Billington earned his first victory with Ottawa on October 25, as he made 23 saves in a 4–1 win over the Mighty Ducks of Anaheim. During the 1993–94 season, Billington earned a record of 11–41–4 record with a 4.59 GAA and a .859 save percentage in 63 games.

Billington returned to the Senators in 1994–95, backing up Don Beaupre, whom the Senators had acquired prior to the season. In nine games with Ottawa, Billington had a 0–6–2 record with a 4.07 GAA and a .867 save percentage.

On April 7, 1995, the Senators traded Billington to the Boston Bruins for an eighth round draft pick in the 1995 NHL entry draft.

==== Boston Bruins (1994–1996) ====
Billington finished the 1994–95 backing up goaltender Blaine Lacher with the Boston Bruins. On April 9, 1995, Billington made his Bruins debut, making 22 saves in a 6–5 win over the Buffalo Sabres to earn his first victory of the season, after going 0–6–2 with Ottawa. In eight games with Boston, Billington had a 5–1–0 record with a 3.05 GAA and a .864 save percentage. Billington appeared in one playoff game during the 1995 playoffs, going 0–0 with a 2.40 GAA and a .900 save percentage.

Billington returned to the Bruins for the 1995–96 season. In 27 games, Billington posted a 10–13–3 with a 3.44 GAA and a .867 save percentage. In the 1996 playoffs, Billington made one start, allowing six goals in a 6–2 loss to the Florida Panthers.

==== Florida Panthers (1996) ====
Billington signed with the Florida Panthers on September 5, 1996. After attending camp with the Panthers, he was made available for the 1996 NHL Waiver Draft. On September 30, 1996, the Colorado Avalanche selected Billington.

==== Colorado Avalanche (1996–1999) ====
On October 17, Billington made his Avalanche debut, making 30 saves in a 2–1 loss to the Florida Panthers. In his next start, on October 28, Billington stopped all 40 shots he faced in a 1–0 victory over the Washington Capitals for his first win with the Avalanche. In 23 games with Colorado during the 1996–97 season, Billington was 11–8–2 with a 2.65 GAA and a .909 save percentage. In one post-season game, Billington played 20 minutes, as he had a 0–0 record with a 3.00 GAA and a .923 save percentage.

Billington returned to Colorado for the 1997–98 season. In 23 games, Billington posted a 8–7–4 record with a 2.32 GAA and a .923 save percentage. In the 1998 post-season, Billington saw one minute of action.

In 1998–99, Billington had a record of 11–8–1 with a 2.87 GAA and a .894 save percentage in 21 games. In the 1999 playoffs, Billington appeared in one game, playing nine minutes. He had a 0–0 record with a 6.68 GAA and a .833 save percentage.

On July 16, 1999, the Avalanche traded Billington to the Washington Capitals for future considerations.

==== Washington Capitals (1999–2003) ====
Billington made his debut with the Washington Capitals on October 19, 1999, as he played the third period against the Mighty Ducks of Anaheim in relief of starting goalie Olaf Kolzig. In 20 minutes of playing time, Billington made three saves on six shots in a 7–1 loss. On October 31, Billington made his first start with the Capitals, making 20 saves in a 2–1 loss to the San Jose Sharks. In his next start, on November 20, Billington stopped all 28 shots he faced in a 3–0 victory over the Boston Bruins for his first win as a member of the Capitals. In 13 games during the 1999–2000 season, Billington had a 3–6–1 record with a 2.75 GAA and a .910 save percentage. In one playoff appearance during the 2000 playoffs, Billington allowed a goal in 20 minutes of playing time, as he had a 0–0 record with a 3.00 GAA and a .833 save percentage.

Billington appeared in 12 games with the Capitals during the 2000–01 season, earning a 3–5–2 record with a 2.45 GAA and a .915 save percentage.

Billington continued his back-up duties during the 2001–02 season with the Capitals. In 17 games, Billington had a 4–5–3 record with a 3.04 GAA and a .878 save percentage.

In the 2002–03, Billington saw limited playing time. In six games, he posted a record of 1–3–1 with a 4.70 GAA and a .823 save percentage. On January 7, 2003, Billington announced his retirement.

== Later career ==
Upon his retirement, Billington joined the Colorado Avalanche's staff, eventually working up to an assistant general manager position in 2009. In the 2016–17 season, he was named the general manager of the Avalanche's American Hockey League affiliate, the San Antonio Rampage. The following season, he held the same position with the Avalanche's new affiliate, the Colorado Eagles.

== Career statistics ==
=== Regular season and playoffs ===
Bold indicates led league

			Regular season									Playoffs
Season	Team	League	GP	W	L	T	MIN	GA	SO	GAA	SV%	GP	W	L	MIN	GA	SO	GAA	SV%
1982–83	Thayer Academy	HS-Prep	23	—	—	—	1338	76	0	3.41	—	—	—	—	—	—	—	—	—
1983–84	Belleville Bulls	OHL	44	22	19	0	2335	162	1	4.16	—	1	0	0	30	3	0	6.00	—
1984–85	Belleville Bulls	OHL	47	26	19	0	2544	180	1	4.25	—	14	7	5	761	47	1	3.71	—
1985–86	Belleville Bulls	OHL	3	2	1	0	180	11	0	3.67	.893	20	9	6	1133	68	0	3.60	—
1985–86	New Jersey Devils	NHL	18	4	9	1	901	77	0	5.13	.840	—	—	—	—	—	—	—	—
1986–87	Maine Mariners	AHL	20	9	7	2	1151	70	0	3.65	.873	—	—	—	—	—	—	—	—
1986–87	New Jersey Devils	NHL	22	4	13	2	1114	89	0	4.79	.844	—	—	—	—	—	—	—	—
1987–88	Utica Devils	AHL	59	22	27	8	3404	208	1	3.67	.880	—	—	—	—	—	—	—	—
1988–89	Utica Devils	AHL	41	17	18	6	2432	150	2	3.70	.872	4	1	3	220	18	0	4.91	—
1988–89	New Jersey Devils	NHL	3	1	1	0	140	11	0	4.71	.831	—	—	—	—	—	—	—	—
1989–90	Utica Devils	AHL	38	20	13	1	2087	138	0	3.97	.870	—	—	—	—	—	—	—	—
1990–91	Canadian National Team	Intl	34	17	14	2	1879	110	2	3.51	—	—	—	—	—	—	—	—	—
1991–92	New Jersey Devils	NHL	26	13	7	1	1363	69	2	3.04	.892	—	—	—	—	—	—	—	—
1992–93	New Jersey Devils	NHL	42	21	16	4	2389	146	2	3.67	.876	2	0	1	78	5	0	3.83	.872
1993–94	Ottawa Senators	NHL	63	11	**41**	4	3319	**254**	0	4.59	.859	—	—	—	—	—	—	—	—
1994–95	Ottawa Senators	NHL	9	0	6	2	472	32	0	4.07	.867	—	—	—	—	—	—	—	—
1994–95	Boston Bruins	NHL	8	5	1	0	373	19	0	3.06	.864	1	0	0	25	1	0	2.40	.900
1995–96	Boston Bruins	NHL	27	10	13	3	1380	79	1	3.43	.867	1	0	1	60	6	0	6.00	.786
1996–97	Colorado Avalanche	NHL	23	11	8	2	1200	53	1	2.65	.909	1	0	0	20	1	0	3.00	.923
1997–98	Colorado Avalanche	NHL	23	8	7	4	1162	45	1	2.32	.923	1	0	0	1	0	0	0.00	1.000
1998–99	Colorado Avalanche	NHL	21	11	8	1	1086	52	0	2.87	.894	1	0	0	9	1	0	6.68	.833
1999–00	Washington Capitals	NHL	13	3	6	1	611	28	2	2.75	.910	1	0	0	20	1	0	3.00	.833
2000–01	Washington Capitals	NHL	12	3	5	2	660	27	0	2.45	.915	—	—	—	—	—	—	—	—
2001–02	Washington Capitals	NHL	17	4	5	3	710	36	0	3.04	.878	—	—	—	—	—	—	—	—
2002–03	Washington Capitals	NHL	5	1	3	1	217	17	0	4.70	.823	—	—	—	—	—	—	—	—
NHL totals			332	110	149	31	17,092	1034	9	3.63	.877	8	0	2	213	15	0	4.23	.870

=== International ===
Medal record

Representing Canada

Ice hockey

World Junior Championships
Gold medal – first place	1985 Helsinki	
Silver medal – second place	1986 Hamilton	

Year	Team	Event	GP	W	L	T	MIN	GA	SO	GAA
1985	Canada	WJC	5	3	0	2	300	13	1	2.60
1986	Canada	WJC	5	4	1	0	300	14	0	2.80
1991	Canada	WC	3	0	0	1	46	3	0	3.91
Junior totals			10	7	1	2	600	27	1	2.70

== Awards and honors ==
- Directorate Award (Best Goaltender), 1985 IIHF world junior hockey championships
- Selected Scholastic Player of the year in OHL in 1984–85
- Most Valuable Player in OHL All-Star game in 1984–85
- Silver medalist in Men's World Championship for Team Canada in 1990–91
- NHL All-Star in 1993
