= Daniil Zharkov =

Russian ice hockey player

- Born: February 6, 1994 (age 32) Saint Petersburg, Russia
- Height: 6 ft 4 in (193 cm)
- Weight: 208 lb (94 kg; 14 st 12 lb)
- Position: Left wing
- Shoots: Left
- KHL team: Torpedo Nizhny Novgorod
- NHL draft: 91st overall, 2012; Edmonton Oilers
- Playing career: 2013–present

Daniil Edgardovich Zharkov (Russian: Даниил Эдгардович Жарков; born February 6, 1994) is a Russian ice hockey player. He is currently playing with Torpedo Nizhny Novgorod of the Kontinental Hockey League (KHL). The Edmonton Oilers selected Zharkov with the last pick of the third round (91st overall) in the 2012 NHL entry draft.

Zharkov began his 2010-11 season in the Russian Minor Hockey League with Serebryanie LVI St. Petersburg where he scored 3 points in 12 games. He then came to North America to finish the season with the Tri-City Storm of the USHL where he tallied 8 goals and 3 assists in 36 games. Zharkov was selected by the Belleville Bulls 13th overall in the 2011 CHL import draft.

He has completed his first season in the Ontario Hockey League (2011–12) with the Belleville Bulls. His 2011-12 highlights included being selected and playing in the 2012 MasterCard Top Prospects game in Kelowna, British Columbia.

Zharkov made his Kontinental Hockey League debut playing with Torpedo Nizhny Novgorod during the 2013–14 KHL season.

== Awards and honours ==
Award	Year
CHL Top Prospects Game – Team Cherry	2012
