= Marc Rancourt =

Canadian ice hockey player

- Born: April 28, 1984 (age 41); Gloucester, Ontario, Canada
- Height: 6 ft 1 in (185 cm)
- Weight: 197 lb (89 kg; 14 st 1 lb)
- Position: Left wing
- Shoots: Left
- 2.GBun team Former teams: Landshut Cannibals; OHL; Belleville Bulls; CIS; Saint Mary's University
- NHL draft: Undrafted
- Playing career: 2010–present

Marc Rancourt
Medal record

Men's ice hockey

Representing Canada

Pan American Tournament
Gold medal – first place	2014 Mexico	

Marc Rancourt (born April 28, 1984) is a Canadian professional ice hockey player who from 2010-2011 played with the Landshut Cannibals in the German 2nd Bundesliga.

== Awards and honours ==
Award	Year
Senator Joseph A. Sullivan Trophy - CIS Player of the year	2008–09
