= Shawn Lalonde =

Canadian ice hockey player (born 1990)

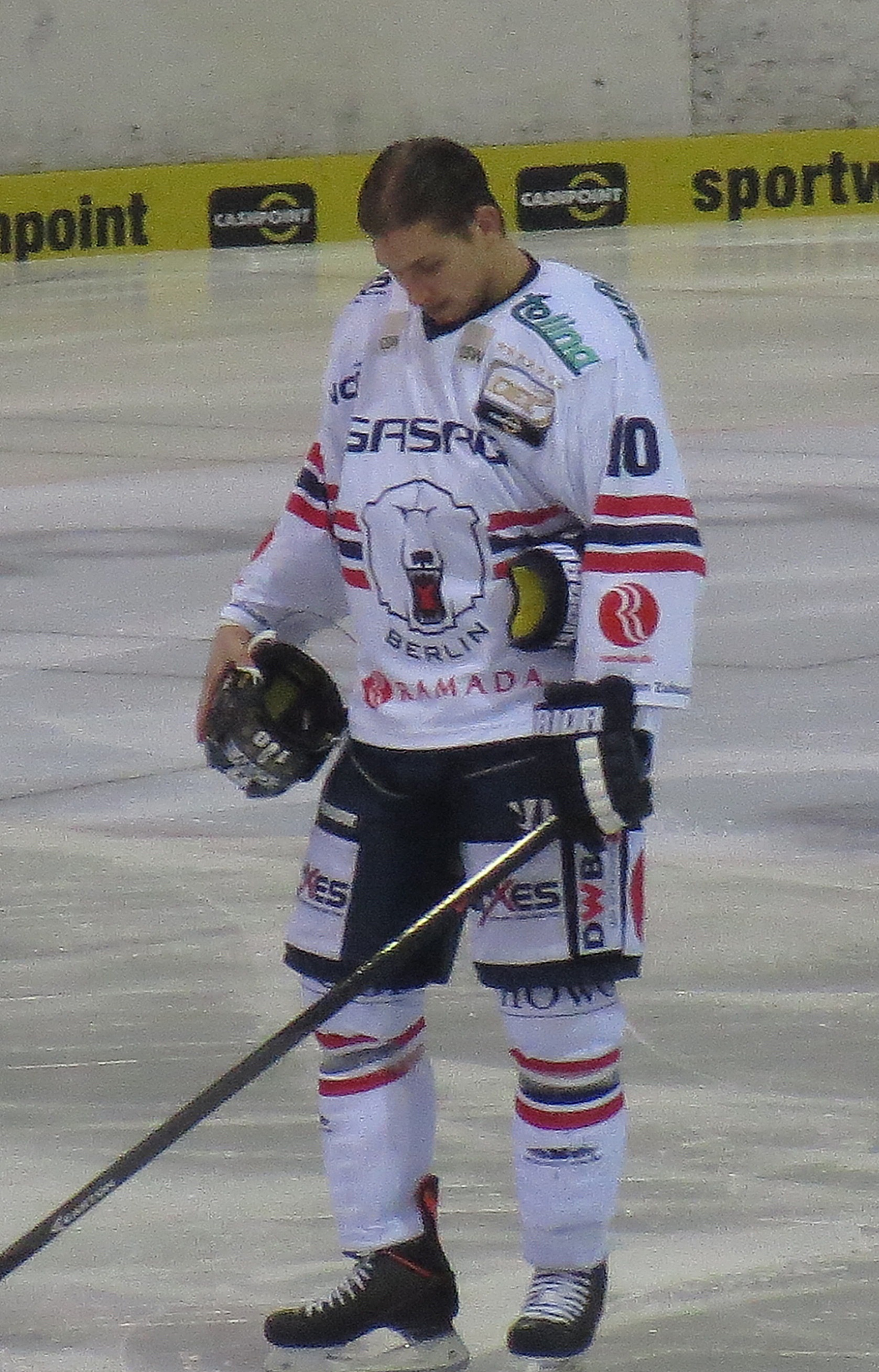
- Lalonde with Eisbären Berlin in 2013
- Born: March 10, 1990 (age 36) Orleans, Ontario, Canada
- Height: 6 ft 1 in (185 cm)
- Weight: 192 lb (87 kg; 13 st 10 lb)
- Position: Defence
- Shot: Right
- Played for: Chicago Blackhawks; Eisbären Berlin; Färjestad BK; Kölner Haie; Thomas Sabo Ice Tigers; Admiral Vladivostok; Severstal Cherepovets; Ässät; Dinamo Minsk; HC Slovan Bratislava; HC Kosice; HC Nove Zamky; HK Olimpija
- NHL draft: 68th overall, 2008; Chicago Blackhawks
- Playing career: 2010–2025

Shawn Beauchamp-Lalonde (born March 10, 1990) is a Canadian former professional ice hockey defenceman. He last played for HK Olimpija Ljubljana in the ICE Hockey League.

== Playing career ==
As a youth, Lalonde played in the 2003 Quebec International Pee-Wee Hockey Tournament with a minor ice hockey team from Cumberland, Ontario.

Lalonde was drafted 68th overall by the Chicago Blackhawks in the 2008 NHL entry draft. Lalonde signed a three-year entry-level contract with the Blackhawks on December 31, 2009. At the time, Lalonde played for the Belleville Bulls, a junior team in the Ontario Hockey League.

In the 2009–10 season, Lalonde led the Bulls' defense and finished first on his team by scoring with 56 points in 58 games, earning selection to the OHL Third All-Star Team.

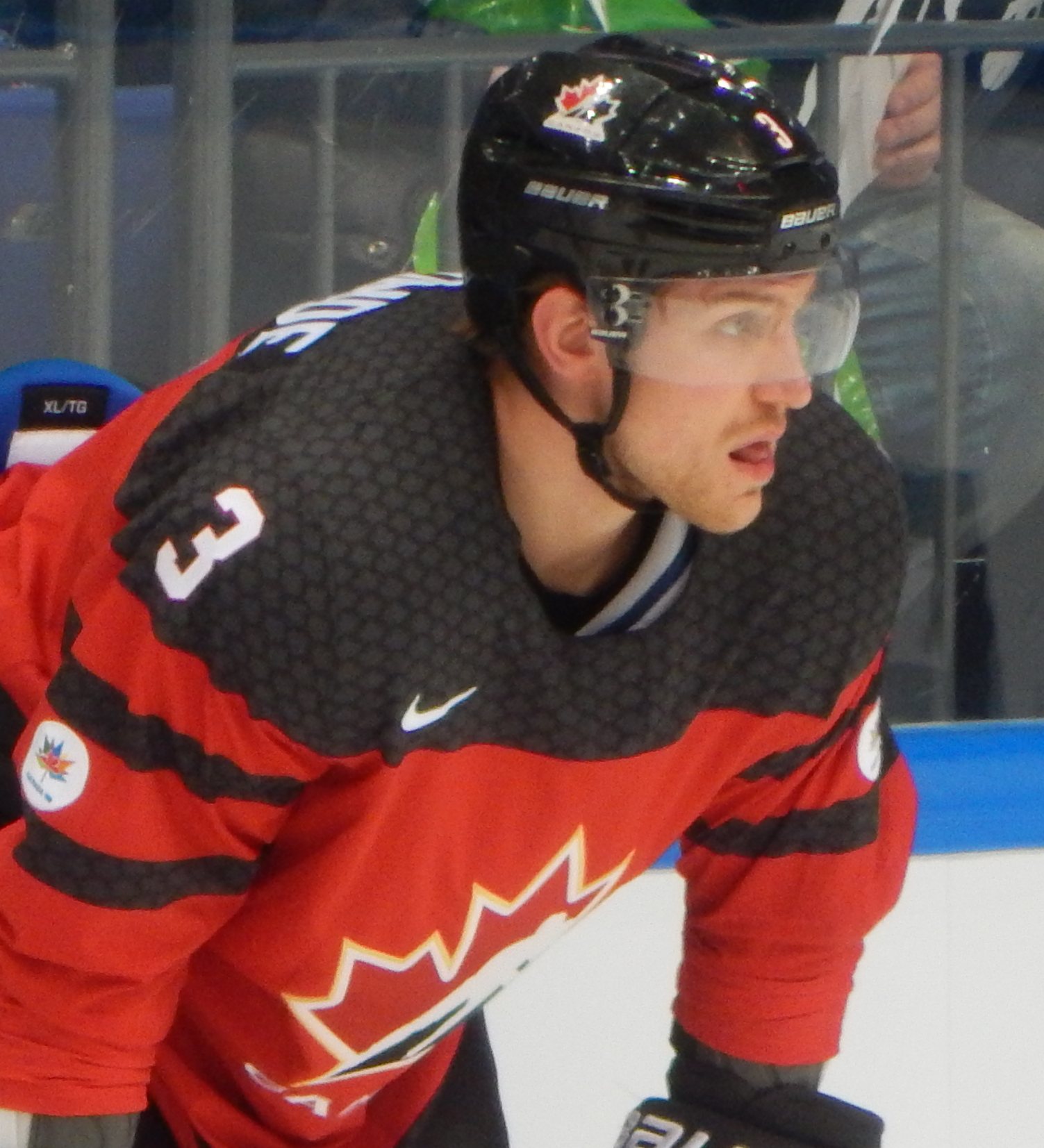
Lalonde with Team Canada in 2017.

After finishing out of the OHL playoffs, Lalonde was assigned to play for the Blackhawks American Hockey League affiliate, the Rockford Icehogs, on March 16, 2010. Lalonde scored his first professional goal with the Icehogs in a 4–3 victory over the Peoria Rivermen on March 26, before appearing in three playoff games with the IceHogs.

On April 14, 2011, the Chicago Blackhawks called Lalonde up to the NHL. Lalonde made his NHL debut for the Blackhawks on April 27, 2013, against the St. Louis Blues. He had 14:47 of ice time, playing both the wing and defence and finishing the game as a +1, being on ice for Chicago's only goal of the contest. Lalonde remained with the Blackhawks during their playoff run.

On July 24, 2013, Lalonde left the Blackhawks organization and signed a one-year contract with German club Eisbären Berlin of the DEL. In the 2013–14 season, Lalonde quickly established himself amongst the Berlin blueline, finishing the season as the top scoring defenceman with 12 goals and 30 points.

Unable to agree on an extension with Berlin on April 28, 2014, Lalonde signed a contract with Swedish club Färjestad BK. In his only season in Sweden, Lalonde failed to adapt his offensive presence and numbers from the DEL in producing 13 points from 50 regular season games.

For the 2015–16 season he returned to Germany, signing a two-year contract with the Kölner Haie of the DEL. Lalonde regained his scoring touch for his previous stint in Germany and led all defenseman in the DEL in goals over the following two seasons.

During the 2017–18 season, Lalonde posted 6 goals and 18 points in 44 games before his contract was terminated by Kölner Haie on February 27, 2018. He remained in Germany for the 2018-19 season, recording 8 goals and 31 points in 49 games with the Thomas Sabo Ice Tigers.

As a free agent, Lalonde agreed to move to the KHL, signing a one-year contract with Russian club, Admiral Vladivostok, on May 10, 2019. In his debut season in the KHL in 2019–20, Lalonde co-led the team in scoring from the blueline registering 7 goals and 26 points in 54 games.

On May 1, 2020, Lalonde left Admiral at the conclusion of his contract and moved to Severstal Cherepovets by agreeing to a one-year contract as a free agent. In the following 2020–21 season, Lalonde as a regular in Severstal's blueline, and serving as an alternate captain, registered 4 goals and 15 points through 51 regular season games.

Lalone continued his European journeyman career in the following off-season, leaving the KHL, by agreeing to a one-year contract with Austrian-based club, Vienna Capitals of the ICE Hockey League, on August 18, 2021. Before he made an appearance with the Capitals, Lalonde cancelled his contract in order to move to the Finnish Liiga with Ässät for the 2021–22 season.

On June 9, 2022, Lalonde returned to the KHL, in securing a one-year contract with Belarusian club, HC Dinamo Minsk.

On February 15, 2025, Lalonde signed a contract with Slovenian club, HK Olimpija Ljubljana of the ICE Hockey League.

In the off-season, Lalonde extended with the club, but left the team and retired before the 2025–26 season began.

== Career statistics ==
=== Regular season and playoffs ===
			Regular season					Playoffs
Season	Team	League	GP	G	A	Pts	PIM	GP	G	A	Pts	PIM
2005–06	Cumberland Barons	ODMHL	60	18	36	54	98	—	—	—	—	—
2006–07	Belleville Bulls	OHL	58	6	20	26	71	13	1	1	2	6
2007–08	Belleville Bulls	OHL	66	9	22	31	67	21	2	7	9	25
2008–09	Belleville Bulls	OHL	66	19	35	54	73	17	3	9	12	36
2009–10	Belleville Bulls	OHL	58	13	43	56	87	—	—	—	—	—
2009–10	Rockford IceHogs	AHL	8	1	1	2	11	3	0	0	0	2
2010–11	Rockford IceHogs	AHL	73	5	27	32	76	—	—	—	—	—
2011–12	Rockford IceHogs	AHL	64	2	11	13	100	—	—	—	—	—
2012–13	Rockford IceHogs	AHL	59	5	18	23	91	—	—	—	—	—
2012–13	Chicago Blackhawks	NHL	1	0	0	0	0	—	—	—	—	—
2013–14	Eisbären Berlin	DEL	47	12	18	30	137	3	0	0	0	6
2014–15	Färjestad BK	SHL	50	5	8	13	84	3	0	0	0	0
2015–16	Kölner Haie	DEL	50	12	24	36	102	15	1	7	8	32
2016–17	Kölner Haie	DEL	49	13	21	34	98	7	4	1	5	33
2017–18	Kölner Haie	DEL	44	6	12	18	58	—	—	—	—	—
2018–19	Thomas Sabo Ice Tigers	DEL	49	8	23	31	56	8	1	5	6	22
2019–20	Admiral Vladivostok	KHL	54	7	19	26	123	—	—	—	—	—
2020–21	Severstal Cherepovets	KHL	51	4	11	15	41	5	1	2	3	32
2021–22	Ässät	Liiga	37	2	11	13	16	—	—	—	—	—
2022–23	Dinamo Minsk	KHL	48	1	13	14	71	1	0	0	0	0
2023–24	HC Slovan Bratislava	Slovak	14	0	10	10	29	—	—	—	—	—
NHL totals			1	0	0	0	0	—	—	—	—	—
KHL totals			153	12	43	55	235	6	1	2	3	32

=== International ===
Year	Team	Event	Result	GP	G	A	Pts	PIM
2007	Canada	IH18	4th	4	1	3	4	16
Junior totals				4	1	3	4	16

== Awards and honours ==
Award	Year
OHL
All-Star Game	2010
Third All-Star Team	2010
