= Hamilton Bulldogs (OHL) =

Canadian junior ice hockey team (2015–2023)

- City: Hamilton, Ontario
- League: Ontario Hockey League
- Conference: Eastern Conference
- Division: East
- Founded: 1981
- Operated: 2015–2023
- Home arena: FirstOntario Centre
- Colours: Black, gold, white

Franchise history
- 1981–2015: Belleville Bulls
- 2015–2023: Hamilton Bulldogs
- 2023–present: Brantford Bulldogs

Championships
- Division titles: (2018, 2022)
- Robertson Cups: (2018, 2022)

The Hamilton Bulldogs were a Canadian major junior ice hockey team in the Ontario Hockey League (OHL) that began to play in the 2015–16 season. Based in Hamilton, Ontario, the Bulldogs played home games at FirstOntario Centre. They were purchased by owner Michael Andlauer in March 2015 and relocated to Hamilton after 34 years in Belleville, Ontario, where they were known as the Bulls. The Bulldogs won OHL championships in 2018 and 2022.

The Bulldogs replaced the American Hockey League team of the same name, also formerly owned by Andlauer. The original team played in Hamilton from 1996 to 2015, after which they moved to St. John's, Newfoundland and Labrador, to become the second incarnation of the St. John's IceCaps.

== History ==
In March 2015, Michael Andlauer acquired the Belleville Bulls and that they would move into the FirstOntario Centre for the 2015–16 season as the Hamilton Bulldogs. The Hamilton Bulldogs franchise which played in the American Hockey League had been sold to the Montreal Canadiens and moved to St. John's, Newfoundland, for the 2015–16 season.

In February 2023, due to upcoming renovations to the FirstOntario Centre, the Bulldogs announced they would be temporarily relocating to the Brantford Civic Centre and renaming as the Brantford Bulldogs for at least three seasons, beginning in the 2023–24 season. The Civic Centre will also be undergoing over $9 million in renovations, funded by both the Bulldogs and the City of Brantford.

In January 2025, National Hockey League player Zach Hyman and his family purchased the Bulldogs from Michael Andlauer, and signed a memorandum of understanding with the City of Brantford for the Bulldogs to play at a proposed sports complex in Brantford for 15 years, despite $290 million renovations to FirstOntario Centre.

== Coaches ==
- 2015–2016, George Burnett
- 2016–2018, John Gruden
- 2018–2019, Dave Matsos
- 2019–2020, Vince Laise
- 2020, Steve Staios (interim)
- 2021–2023, Jay McKee

== General managers ==
- 2015–2016, George Burnett
- 2016–2022, Steve Staios (6)
- 2022–2023, Matt Turek

== Players ==
=== Team captains ===
- Justin Lemcke (2015–2018)
- MacKenzie Entwistle (2018–2019)
- Matthew Strome (2018–2019 )
- Isaac Nurse (2019–2020)
- Colton Kammerer (2021–2022)
- Logan Morrison (2022–2023)

=== Notable players ===
List of notable players:

- William Bitten
- Nick Caamano
- MacKenzie Entwistle
- Kaden Fulcher
- Ben Gleason
- Jan Jeník
- Arthur Kaliyev
- Matt Luff
- Mason Marchment
- Connor McMichael
- Mason McTavish
- Christian Mieritz
- Logan Morrison
- Riley Stillman
- Marian Studenic
- Robert Thomas
- Ryan Winterton
- Arber Xhekaj

=== NHL first-round draft picks ===
- 2017: Robert Thomas, 20th overall, St. Louis Blues
- 2019: Connor McMichael, 25th overall, Washington Capitals
- 2021: Mason McTavish, 3rd overall, Anaheim Ducks

== Season-by-season results ==
List of regular season and playoffs results:

Legend: GP = Games played, W = Wins, L = Losses, T = Ties, OTL = Overtime losses, SL = Shoot-out losses, Pts = Points, GF = Goals for, GA = Goals against

Memorial Cup champions	OHL champions	OHL finalists

Season	Regular season										Playoffs
Season	GP	W	L	OTL	SOL	Pts	Pct	GF	GA	Finish	Playoffs
2015–16	68	25	35	8	0	58	.426	197	260	5th East	Did not qualify
2016–17	68	33	27	4	4	74	.544	238	225	4th East	Lost conference quarterfinals (Kingston Frontenacs) 4–3
2017–18	68	43	18	4	3	93	.684	252	207	1st East	Won conference quarterfinals (Ottawa 67's) 4–1; Won conference semifinals (Niagara IceDogs) 4–1; Won conference finals (Kingston Frontenacs) 4–1; Won OHL finals (Sault Ste. Marie Greyhounds) 4–2; Lost 2018 Memorial Cup semifinal (Regina Pats) 4–2
2018–19	68	29	34	3	2	63	.463	241	283	4th East	Lost conference quarterfinals (Ottawa 67's) 4–0
2019–20	62	24	30	7	1	56	.452	235	267	4th East	Playoffs cancelled due to the COVID-19 pandemic
2020–21	Season cancelled due to the COVID-19 pandemic										
2021–22	68	51	12	3	2	107	.787	300	176	1st East	Won conference quarterfinals (Peterborough Petes) 4–0; Won conference semifinals (Mississauga Steelheads) 4–0; Won conference finals (North Bay Battalion) 4–0; Won OHL final (Windsor Spitfires) 4–3; Lost 2022 Memorial Cup final (Saint John Sea Dogs) 6–3
2022–23	68	33	30	5	0	71	.522	226	251	3rd East	Lost conference quarterfinals (Barrie Colts) 4–2

== See also ==
- List of ice hockey teams in Ontario
