= Lou Crawford =

Canadian ice hockey player

- Born: November 5, 1962 (age 62); Belleville, Ontario, Canada
- Height: 6 ft 0 in (183 cm)
- Weight: 185 lb (84 kg; 13 st 3 lb)
- Position: Left wing
- Shot: Left
- Played for: Boston Bruins
- NHL draft: Undrafted
- Playing career: 1982–1994

Louis J. Crawford (born November 5, 1962) is a Canadian former professional ice hockey player who played 26 games in the National Hockey League between 1989 and 1992. He played with the Boston Bruins. He is the brother of Marc Crawford and Bob Crawford.

== Career statistics ==
=== Regular season and playoffs ===
			Regular season					Playoffs
Season	Team	League	GP	G	A	Pts	PIM	GP	G	A	Pts	PIM
1978–79	Belleville Bobcats	MJAHL	45	25	30	55	107	—	—	—	—	—
1979–80	Belleville Bobcats	MJAHL	10	7	11	18	60	—	—	—	—	—
1979–80	Cornwall Royals	QMJHL	24	0	1	1	46	—	—	—	—	—
1980–81	Kitchener Rangers	OHL	53	2	7	9	134	—	—	—	—	—
1981–82	Kitchener Rangers	OHL	64	11	17	28	243	15	3	4	7	71
1981–82	Kitchener Rangers	M-Cup	—	—	—	—	—	5	0	1	1	20
1982–83	Rochester Americans	AHL	64	5	11	16	142	13	1	1	2	7
1983–84	Rochester Americans	AHL	76	7	6	13	234	17	2	4	6	87
1984–85	Rochester Americans	AHL	70	8	7	15	213	1	0	0	0	10
1985–86	Nova Scotia Oilers	AHL	78	8	11	19	214	—	—	—	—	—
1986–87	Nova Scotia Oilers	AHL	35	3	4	7	48	—	—	—	—	—
1987–88	Nova Scotia Oilers	AHL	65	15	15	30	170	4	1	2	3	9
1988–89	Adirondack Red Wings	AHL	74	23	23	46	179	9	0	6	6	32
1989–90	Boston Bruins	NHL	7	0	0	0	20	—	—	—	—	—
1989–90	Maine Mariners	AHL	62	15	13	28	162	—	—	—	—	—
1990–91	Maine Mariners	AHL	80	18	17	35	215	2	0	0	0	5
1991–92	Boston Bruins	NHL	19	2	1	3	9	—	—	—	—	—
1991–92	Maine Mariners	AHL	54	17	15	32	171	—	—	—	—	—
1992–93	Milwaukee Admirals	IHL	56	16	14	30	108	6	2	2	4	8
1993–94	St. John's Maple Leafs	AHL	3	0	0	0	0	—	—	—	—	—
1993–94	Brantford Smoke	CoHL	21	12	17	29	39	7	4	0	4	17
AHL totals			661	119	122	241	1748	46	4	13	17	150
NHL totals			26	2	1	3	29	1	0	0	0	0
