= Tyler Randell (ice hockey) =

Canadian ice hockey player (born 1991)

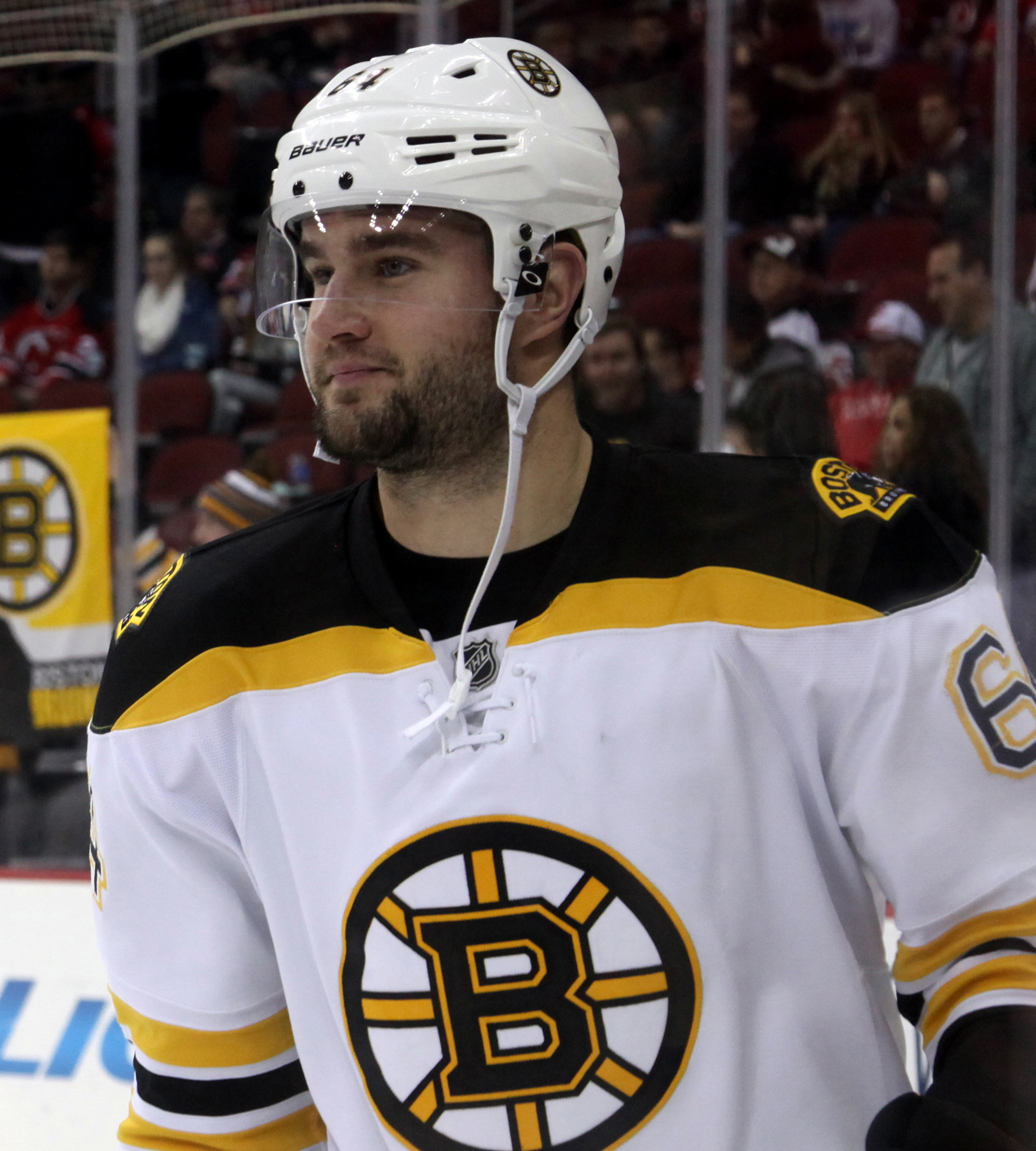
- Randell with the Boston Bruins in 2016
- Born: June 15, 1991 (age 35) Scarborough, Ontario, Canada
- Height: 6 ft 1 in (185 cm)
- Weight: 198 lb (90 kg; 14 st 2 lb)
- Position: Right wing
- Shot: Right
- Played for: Boston Bruins
- NHL draft: 176th overall, 2009; Boston Bruins
- Playing career: 2011–2020

Tyler Randell (born June 15, 1991) is a Canadian former professional ice hockey forward. Randell was selected by the Boston Bruins in the sixth round (176th overall) of the 2009 NHL entry draft.

== Playing career ==
As a youth, Randell played in the 2004 Quebec International Pee-Wee Hockey Tournament with a minor ice hockey team from Brampton.

Drafted by the Belleville Bulls in the first round (14th overall) of the 2009 Ontario Hockey League (OHL) Priority Selection, Randell played 267 games in the OHL with the Belleville Bulls and Kitchener Rangers, registering a total of 68 goals and 43 assists for 111 points, and 392 penalty minutes. Randell appeared in the 2008 Memorial Cup with Belleville. Following the 2008–09 OHL season, Randell was selected by the Boston Bruins in the sixth round of the 2009 NHL entry draft, and on April 18, 2011, the Boston Bruins signed Randell to a three-year entry-level contract. On June 18, 2015, the Bruins signed Randell to a one-year contract extension.

During the 2015–16 season, he played in Boston. He made his NHL debut on October 14, 2015, against the Colorado Avalanche and also scored his first goal, which was a game-winning goal. He ended the season with six points (all goals), five fights and re-signed on July 1, 2016, with the Bruins on a one-year deal.

On July 1, 2017, Randell left the Bruins as a free agent to sign a one-year, two-way deal with the Ottawa Senators. He was assigned by Ottawa to join affiliate, the Belleville Senators, for the duration of their inaugural season in the AHL in 2017–18. As a veteran presence, Randell added physicality and contributed with 3 goals and 8 points in 57 games.

As a free agent from the Senators, Randell continued in the AHL by securing a one-year contract with the Rochester Americans, an affiliate to the Buffalo Sabres, on July 18, 2018. In his first year with the Americans in the 2018–19 season, Randell contributed with 3 goals and 7 points in 36 games, limited through injury. On July 5, 2019, he agreed to return with Rochester on a one-year contract extension.

After 9 professional seasons, Randell announced his retirement from professional hockey on January 17, 2021.

== Career statistics ==
=== Regular season and playoffs ===
| | | | Regular season | | | | | Playoffs |
| Season | Team | League | GP | G | A | Pts | PIM | GP | G | A | Pts | PIM |
|---|---|---|---|---|---|---|---|---|---|---|---|---|
| 2007–08 | Belleville Bulls | OHL | 62 | 5 | 6 | 11 | 24 | 19 | 0 | 0 | 0 | 0 |
| 2008–09 | Belleville Bulls | OHL | 36 | 10 | 5 | 15 | 60 | — | — | — | — | — |
| 2008–09 | Kitchener Rangers | OHL | 37 | 14 | 8 | 22 | 39 | — | — | — | — | — |
| 2009–10 | Kitchener Rangers | OHL | 47 | 9 | 12 | 21 | 88 | 20 | 1 | 4 | 5 | 19 |
| 2010–11 | Kitchener Rangers | OHL | 68 | 21 | 11 | 32 | 160 | 7 | 0 | 0 | 0 | 7 |
| 2011–12 | Providence Bruins | AHL | 30 | 2 | 0 | 2 | 45 | — | — | — | — | — |
| 2011–12 | Kitchener Rangers | OHL | 17 | 9 | 1 | 10 | 21 | 6 | 7 | 1 | 8 | 14 |
| 2012–13 | South Carolina Stingrays | ECHL | 22 | 2 | 2 | 4 | 46 | — | — | — | — | — |
| 2012–13 | Providence Bruins | AHL | 23 | 0 | 0 | 0 | 56 | — | — | — | — | — |
| 2013–14 | Providence Bruins | AHL | 43 | 4 | 7 | 11 | 93 | 8 | 1 | 0 | 1 | 6 |
| 2014–15 | Providence Bruins | AHL | 74 | 11 | 9 | 20 | 120 | 5 | 0 | 0 | 0 | 4 |
| 2015–16 | Boston Bruins | NHL | 27 | 6 | 0 | 6 | 47 | — | — | — | — | — |
| 2015–16 | Providence Bruins | AHL | 2 | 0 | 0 | 0 | 0 | — | — | — | — | — |
| 2016–17 | Providence Bruins | AHL | 59 | 1 | 9 | 10 | 81 | 12 | 0 | 0 | 0 | 20 |
| 2017–18 | Belleville Senators | AHL | 57 | 3 | 5 | 8 | 94 | — | — | — | — | — |
| 2018–19 | Rochester Americans | AHL | 36 | 3 | 4 | 7 | 45 | — | — | — | — | — |
| 2019–20 | Rochester Americans | AHL | 22 | 5 | 2 | 7 | 35 | — | — | — | — | — |
| NHL totals | | | 27 | 6 | 0 | 6 | 47 | — | — | — | — | — |

=== International ===
| Year | Team | Event | Result | GP | G | A | Pts | PIM |
|---|---|---|---|---|---|---|---|---|
| 2008 | Canada Ontario | U17 | 1st place, gold medalist(s) | 6 | 1 | 0 | 1 | 4 |
| Junior totals | | | | 6 | 1 | 0 | 1 | 4 |
