= Jim Boyd (ice hockey) =

Canadian ice hockey player

James Boyd
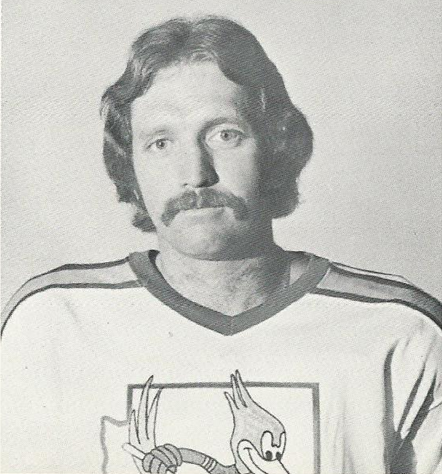
- Born: June 4, 1949 (age 76) Calgary, Alberta, Canada
- Height: 5 ft 9 in (175 cm)
- Weight: 181 lb (82 kg; 12 st 13 lb)
- Position: Forward
- Shot: Left
- Played for: WHA; Phoenix Roadrunners; Calgary Cowboys; CHL; Amarillo Wranglers; Oklahoma City Stars; IHL; Fort Wayne Komets
- NHL draft: Undrafted
- Playing career: 1971–1979

James Patrick Boyd (born June 4, 1949) is a former Canadian professional ice hockey player.

== Career ==
Boyd played three seasons (1974–1977) in the World Hockey Association (WHA) with the Phoenix Roadrunners and Calgary Cowboys. He scored 49 goals and 80 assists for 129 points, while earning 68 penalty minutes, in 169 WHA games played.

== Career statistics ==
=== Regular season and playoffs ===
			Regular season					Playoffs
Season	Team	League	GP	G	A	Pts	PIM	GP	G	A	Pts	PIM
1968–69	University of Wisconsin	NCAA	34	25	21	46	33	—	—	—	—	—
1969–70	University of Wisconsin	WCHA	34	16	15	31	34	—	—	—	—	—
1970–71	University of Wisconsin	WCHA	33	19	30	49	42	—	—	—	—	—
1970–71	Amarillo Wranglers	CHL	2	1	0	1	0	—	—	—	—	—
1971–72	Fort Wayne Komets	IHL	67	26	54	80	37	8	4	7	11	4
1972–73	Phoenix Roadrunners	WHL	72	22	50	72	58	10	3	8	11	10
1973–74	Oklahoma City Blazers	CHL	72	24	36	60	40	10	1	5	6	8
1974–75	Phoenix Roadrunners	WHA	76	26	44	70	18	5	1	1	2	2
1975–76	Phoenix Roadrunners	WHA	80	23	34	57	44	5	3	2	5	2
1976–77	Calgary Cowboys	WHA	13	0	2	2	6	—	—	—	—	—
1977–78	Graz EC	Austria	Statistics Unavailable
1978–79	Phoenix Roadrunners	PHL	60	20	61	81	30	—	—	—	—	—
WHA totals			23	5	7	12	4	—	—	—	—	—
