= Dwayne Gylywoychuk =

Canadian ice hockey player and coach

- Born: June 27, 1973 (age 52) Brandon, Manitoba, Canada
- Height: 6 ft 3 in (191 cm)
- Weight: 225 lb (102 kg; 16 st 1 lb)
- Position: Defence
- Shot: Left
- Played for: ECHL; Greensboro Monarchs; Jacksonville Lizard Kings; Dayton Bombers; WPHL; Central Texas Stampede; Shreveport Mudbugs; Waco Wizards; CHL; Wichita Thunder; EPIHL; Romford Raiders
- National team: Canada
- NHL draft: Undrafted
- Playing career: 1994–2001

Dwayne Gylywoychuk (/ɡɪləˈweɪtʃʊk/ ghill-ə-WAY-chuuk; born June 27, 1973) is a Canadian former professional ice hockey defenceman.

== Junior career ==
Gylywoychuk played five seasons (1989–1994) of major junior hockey with the Brandon Wheat Kings of the Western Hockey League. He holds the franchise record for games played for the Wheat Kings, scoring 9 goals and 40 assists for 49 points, while earning 614 penalty minutes, in 323 games played.

== Professional career ==
Gylywoychuk went on to play with eight different teams in four different professional leagues over the course of his seven-year playing career. He retired as a player following the 2000-01 season, after winning the English Premier Ice Hockey League Playoff Championship as a member of the Romford Raiders.

== Coaching career ==
Gylywoychuk joined the Brandon Weat Kings as an assistant coach commencing with the 2003–04 WHL season, and was named the team's head coach for the 2012–13 WHL season. The Wheat King finished the 2012–13 season as the Eastern Conference's last place team, and Gylywoychuk was replaced as head coach by General Manager Kelly McCrimmon prior to the start of the 2013–14 season.

== Career statistics ==
			Regular season					Playoffs
Season	Team	League	GP	G	A	Pts	PIM	GP	G	A	Pts	PIM
1989–90	Brandon Wheat Kings	WHL	58	2	8	10	37	—	—	—	—	—
1990–91	Brandon Wheat Kings	WHL	72	3	9	12	121	—	—	—	—	—
1991–92	Brandon Wheat Kings	WHL	70	2	4	6	163	—	—	—	—	—
1992–93	Brandon Wheat Kings	WHL	68	1	11	12	200	1	0	0	0	2
1993–94	Brandon Wheat Kings	WHL	55	1	8	9	93	12	0	2	2	22
1994–95	Greensboro Monarchs	ECHL	27	1	9	10	42	—	—	—	—	—
1995–96	Jacksonville Lizard Kings	ECHL	48	1	5	6	105	—	—	—	—	—
1995–96	Dayton Bombers	ECHL	5	0	0	0	20	—	—	—	—	—
1996–97	Central Texas Stampede	WPHL	40	1	5	6	45	8	0	1	1	10
1997–98	Central Texas Stampede	WPHL	21	0	2	2	29	—	—	—	—	—
1997–98	Bossier-Shreveport Mudbugs	WPHL	30	1	4	5	32	8	0	2	2	14
1998–99	Central Texas Stampede	WPHL	57	2	4	6	80	2	0	0	0	4
1999–00	Waco Wizards	WPHL	2	0	0	0	4	—	—	—	—	—
1999–00	Wichita Thunder	CHL	30	1	3	4	48	5	0	0	0	14
2000–01	Romford Raiders	EPIHL	12	2	10	12	38	4	0	0	0	14
ECHL totals			80	2	14	16	167	—	—	—	—	—
WPHL totals			150	4	15	19	190	18	0	3	3	28
