= Dean Kolstad =

Canadian ice hockey player

- Born: June 16, 1968 (age 57) Edmonton, Alberta, Canada
- Height: 6 ft 6 in (198 cm)
- Weight: 230 lb (104 kg; 16 st 6 lb)
- Position: Defence
- Shot: Left
- Played for: Minnesota North Stars; San Jose Sharks
- NHL draft: 33rd overall, 1986; Minnesota North Stars
- Playing career: 1988–1998

Dean Kolstad (born June 16, 1968) is a Canadian former professional ice hockey player. He was drafted in the second round, 33rd overall, by the Minnesota North Stars in the 1986 NHL entry draft. He played forty games in the National Hockey League: thirty with the North Stars in the 1988–89 and 1990–91 seasons, and ten with the San Jose Sharks (who selected him in the 1991 NHL Dispersal Draft) in the 1992–93 season.

Kolstad was born in Edmonton, Alberta.

== Career statistics ==
			Regular season					Playoffs
Season	Team	League	GP	G	A	Pts	PIM	GP	G	A	Pts	PIM
1983–84	New Westminster Bruins	WHL	4	1	0	1	0	2	0	0	0	0
1984–85	Langley Eagles	BCJHL	25	3	11	14	61	—	—	—	—	—
1984–85	New Westminster Bruins	WHL	13	0	0	0	16	—	—	—	—	—
1985–86	New Westminster Bruins	WHL	16	0	5	5	19	—	—	—	—	—
1985–86	Prince Albert Raiders	WHL	54	2	15	17	80	20	5	3	8	26
1986–87	Prince Albert Raiders	WHL	72	17	37	54	112	8	1	5	6	8
1987–88	Prince Albert Raiders	WHL	72	14	37	51	121	10	0	9	9	20
1988–89	Minnesota North Stars	NHL	25	1	5	6	42	—	—	—	—	—
1988–89	Kalamazoo Wings	IHL	51	10	23	33	91	6	1	0	1	23
1989–90	Kalamazoo Wings	IHL	77	10	40	50	172	10	3	4	7	14
1990–91	Minnesota North Stars	NHL	5	0	0	0	15	—	—	—	—	—
1990–91	Kalamazoo Wings	IHL	33	4	8	12	50	9	1	6	7	4
1991–92	Kansas City Blades	IHL	74	9	20	29	83	15	3	6	9	8
1992–93	San Jose Sharks	NHL	10	0	2	2	12	—	—	—	—	—
1992–93	Kansas City Blades	IHL	63	9	21	30	79	3	0	0	0	2
1993–94	Binghamton Rangers	AHL	68	7	26	33	92	—	—	—	—	—
1994–95	Minnesota Moose	IHL	73	6	18	24	71	1	0	0	0	2
1995–96	Portland Pirates	AHL	12	1	1	2	14	—	—	—	—	—
1996–97	Central Texas Stampede	WPHL	17	2	10	12	44	11	4	7	11	12
1997–98	Central Texas Stampede	WPHL	66	14	59	73	92	4	2	2	4	10
NHL totals			40	1	7	8	69	—	—	—	—	—

== Awards ==
- WHL East Second All-Star Team – 1988
