= Rob Hrytsak =

Canadian ice hockey player

- Born: August 11, 1965 (age 60) Saskatoon, Saskatchewan, Canada
- Height: 5 ft 11 in (180 cm)
- Weight: 180 lb (82 kg; 12 st 12 lb)
- Position: Center
- Shot: Left
- Played for: Austin Ice Bats; Central Texas Stampede; Fort Worth Fire; Johnstown Chiefs; Knoxville Cherokees; Nashville Nighthawks; Shreveport Mudbugs; Waco Wizards
- NHL draft: undrafted
- Playing career: 1987–2000

Rob Hrytsak (born August 11, 1965) is a Canadian retired professional ice hockey player.

== AAHL/ECHL ==
After two years of junior hockey in Canada, Hrytsak joined the Johnstown Chiefs of the All-American Hockey League in January 1988. Hrytsak scored the first goal in Chiefs' history on January 13, 1988. At the 8:51 mark of the first period, Hrytsak stole a cross-ice pass at center ice and was alone on a breakaway. Hrytsak then lifted the puck over Carolina Thunderbirds' goaltender Bruce Billes shoulder. Hrytsak and the Chiefs won the first game in Chiefs' history 5–3. The Chiefs would finish the regular season 13-13-0 and Hrytsak would share the team lead in points with teammate Scott Rettew with 61.

Hrytsak returned to Johnstown for the 1988-89 ECHL season and led the team in goals (40). Hrytsak's total was also second-highest in the ECHL, with only Virginia's Mike Chighisola outscoring Hrytsak with 45 goals. Hrystak would lead the Chiefs to the inaugural Riley Cup Finals against the Carolina Thunderbirds. Hrytsak would have one of the best Finals performances in ECHL history, scoring 7 goals and 12 points against the Thunderbirds, but the Chiefs would lose the Finals to the Thunderbirds four games to three. Hrytsak's 7 goals in a Finals series remains an ECHL record and his 12 points in a Finals series was a record that has only been topped by two ECHL players since 1989 (Darren Schwartz and Devin Edgerton, both of the 1993 Wheeling Thunderbirds).

After a brief stint in Knoxville where he sat out most nights, Hrytsak returned to Johnstown in December 1990. He remained with the team until the completion of the 1991–92 season. In parts of 5 seasons with the Chiefs, Rob Hrytsak scored 98 goals, 156 assists, and 254 points. Hrytsak's 254 remains an all-time Chiefs record, as the franchise has been inactive since the completion of the 2009-10 ECHL, and his 156 assists and 98 goals are respectively second and fourth-highest in franchise history.

== Europe ==
Hrytsak played two seasons in Germany's Oberliga. Rob Hrytsak led Iserlohner EC with 65 goals in only 46 games, which was the fourth highest total during the 1994-95 Oberliga season.

== Return to North America ==
Hrytsak returned to the minors at the start of the 1996–97 season, and split time between four clubs, with three of them based in the WPHL. Hrytsak also bounced between the Fort Worth Fire of the Central Hockey League and the Shreveport Mudbugs of the WPHL, scoring 30 points in 47 games between the two teams.

Hrytsak briefly returned to Germany to join the Dinslakener Cobras, a fourth-tier German club-level team. In 8 post-season games with the team, Hrytsak scored twenty-four points and accumulated ninety-nine penalty minutes. He retired at the completion of the 1999–2000 season.

== Awards And Accomplishments ==
- January 13, 1988, First goal in franchise history (Johnstown Chiefs)
- 1987-88, Most Assists, (Johnstown Chiefs), 45
- 1987-88, Most Points (Johnstown Chiefs, tied with Scott Rettew), 61
- 1988-89, Most Goals (Johnstown Chiefs), 40
- 1988-89, Most Goals, Riley Cup Final (Johnstown Chiefs), 7
- 1988-89, Most Points, Riley Cup Final (Johnstown Chiefs), 12
- 1988-89, All-ECHL Team
- 1994-95, Most Goals (Iserlohner EC), 65
- 1994-95, Most Assists (Iserlohner EC), 66
- 1994-95, Most Points, (Iserlohner EC) 131
