= List of professional sports teams in Louisiana =

Louisiana is the 25th-most populated state in the United States and has a rich history of professional sports.

== Active teams ==
=== Major league teams ===
Louisiana is home to two major professional sports teams. Both of the teams are located in New Orleans.

American football
League	Team	City	Stadium	Capacity
NFL	New Orleans Saints	New Orleans	Caesars Superdome	73,208
Basketball
League	Team	City	Arena	Capacity
NBA	New Orleans Pelicans	New Orleans	Smoothie King Center	16,867

=== Other professional sports teams ===
Arena football
League	Team	City	Arena	Capacity
NAL	Louisiana Rouxgaroux	Bossier City	Brookshire Grocery Arena	12,440
Basketball
League	Team	City	Arena	Capacity
G-League	Laketown Squadron	Kenner	Pontchartrain Center	3,600
Ice hockey
League	Team	City	Arena	Capacity
FPHL	Monroe Moccasins	Monroe	Monroe Civic Center	7,600

=== Map of cities with a professional sports team ===
Location with a professional sports team

== See also ==
- Sports in Louisiana
