= Jim Burton (ice hockey) =

Canadian ice hockey player (1963–2015)

- Born: November 13, 1961 Brantford, Ontario, Canada
- Died: January 5, 2015 (aged 53) Evans, Georgia, U.S.
- Height: 6 ft 0 in (183 cm)
- Weight: 190 lb (86 kg; 13 st 8 lb)
- Position: Defence
- Shot: Left
- Played for: AHL; Hershey Bears; Rochester Americans; IHL; Fort Wayne Komets; Phoenix Roadrunners; WPHL; Austin Ice Bats; Other; EHC Lustenau (Austria); EC Klagenfurt (Austria)
- National team: Austria
- NHL draft: Undrafted
- Playing career: 1981–1997

James "Jim" Burton (November 13, 1961 – January 5, 2015) was a Canadian-Austrian professional ice hockey defenceman.

== Awards ==
Burton was a three-time winner of the IHL's Governor's Trophy (Larry D. Gordon Trophy) which is awarded annually to the defenseman voted to be most outstanding based on performance over the course of the regular season by the league's coaches.

== Coaching ==
Burton was a head coach in both the WPHL (with the Austin Ice Bats and Arkansas GlacierCats) and the ECHL (with the Augusta Lynx). Burton died of a heart attack on January 5, 2015.

== Career statistics ==
			Regular season					Playoffs
Season	Team	League	GP	G	A	Pts	PIM	GP	G	A	Pts	PIM
1978–79	Brantford Alexanders	OMJHL	60	0	16	16	42	—	—	—	—	—
1979–80	Windsor Spitfires	OMJHL	60	2	29	31	56	—	—	—	—	—
1980–81	Windsor Spitfires	OHL	57	11	47	58	133	—	—	—	—	—
1981–82	Windsor Spitfires	OHL	7	1	8	9	11	—	—	—	—	—
1980–81	Fort Wayne Komets	IHL	77	8	54	62	126	9	0	6	6	12
1982–83	Fort Wayne Komets	IHL	79	17	70	87	114	10	2	11	13	23
1982–83	Hershey Bears	AHL	5	1	0	1	8	—	—	—	—	—
1983–84	Hershey Bears	AHL	75	10	33	43	50	—	—	—	—	—
1984–85	Fort Wayne Komets	IHL	74	15	50	65	60	13	0	6	6	12
1985–86	Fort Wayne Komets	IHL	82	30	64	94	47	15	6	10	16	34
1986–87	Fort Wayne Komets	IHL	58	19	52	71	50	11	2	11	13	25
1986–87	Rochester Americans	AHL	10	0	2	2	4	—	—	—	—	—
1987–88	Fort Wayne Komets	IHL	80	13	74	87	72	5	0	1	1	0
1988–89	EHC Lustenau	Austria	37	18	31	49	—	—	—	—	—	—
1988–89	Fort Wayne Komets	IHL	21	3	13	16	8	11	2	4	6	8
1989–90	EHC Lustenau	Austria	34	8	15	23	55	—	—	—	—	—
1990–91	Klagenfurter AC	Austria	41	18	33	51	83	—	—	—	—	—
1991–92	Klagenfurter AC	Austria	43	10	34	44	36	—	—	—	—	—
1992–93	Klagenfurter AC	Austria	46	14	36	50	72	—	—	—	—	—
1993–94	Klagenfurter AC	Austria	51	18	42	60	58	—	—	—	—	—
1994–95	Klagenfurter AC	Austria	35	15	35	50	—	—	—	—	—	—
1995–96	Klagenfurter AC	Austria	26	5	20	25	46	—	—	—	—	—
1995–96	Phoenix Roadrunners	IHL	9	1	3	4	10	—	—	—	—	—
1996–97	Austin Ice Bats	WPHL	52	21	47	68	65	5	0	4	4	12
IHL totals			480	106	380	486	487	74	12	49	61	114
Austria totals			313	106	246	352	350	—	—	—	—	—
