= Hrytsak =

Hrytsak (Ukrainian: Грицак) is a gender-neutral Ukrainian surname that may refer to:

- Rob Hrytsak (born 1965), Canadian ice hockey player
- Vasyl Hrytsak (born 1967), head of the Security Service of Ukraine
- Yaroslav Hrytsak (born 1960), Ukrainian historian
- Orest Hrytsak, Ukrainian chess grandmaster
