= Matt Barnes (ice hockey) =

Canadian ice hockey player (born 1974)

- Born: July 25, 1974 (age 51) Brantford, Ontario, Canada
- Height: 5 ft 5 in (165 cm)
- Weight: 150 lb (68 kg; 10 st 10 lb)
- Position: Goaltender
- Caught: Left
- Played for: NCAA; Western Michigan University; ECHL; Dayton Bombers; WPHL; Central Texas Stampede; CHL; Tulsa Oilers; Austin Ice Bats; Netherlands; Amsterdam Tigers
- NHL draft: Undrafted
- Playing career: 1999–2006

Matt Barnes (born July 25, 1974) is a Canadian former professional ice hockey goaltender. He is currently a goalie coach with the Rick Heinz Goalie & Hockey School.

Barnes attended Western Michigan University where he played four seasons of NCAA college hockey with the Western Michigan Broncos men's ice hockey team.

== Awards and honours ==
Award	Year
WPHL Most Outstanding Goaltender	1999–2000
CHL Most Outstanding Goaltender	2002–03
