= Larry Mavety =

Canadian ice hockey player and coach (1942–2020)

- Born: May 29, 1942 Woodstock, Ontario, Canada
- Died: December 4, 2020 (aged 78) Kingston, Ontario, Canada
- Height: 5 ft 11 in (180 cm)
- Weight: 185 lb (84 kg; 13 st 3 lb)
- Position: Defence
- Shot: Right
- Played for: Los Angeles Sharks; Philadelphia Blazers; Chicago Cougars; Toronto Toros; Denver Spurs; Indianapolis Racers
- Coached for: Belleville Bulls; Kingston Raiders; Kingston Frontenacs
- Playing career: 1963–1977
- Coaching career: 1981–2009

Lawrence Douglas "Larry" Mavety (29 May 1942 – 4 December 2020) was a Canadian professional ice hockey player, and former coach and executive in the Ontario Hockey League (OHL), with both the Belleville Bulls and the Kingston Frontenacs.

== Playing career ==
=== Toledo Blades (1963–1964) ===
Mavety starting his minor league hockey career in 1963–64 season as a defenceman with the Toledo Blades of the International Hockey League (IHL), recording 20 points (7G-13A), along with 133 PIM in 70 games, and helped the Blades have the best record in the league. He added two points (1G-1A) in 13 playoff games as the Blades won the Turner Cup.

=== Port Huron Flags (1964–1967) ===
After starting the 1964–65 with the Syracuse Stars, an independent team, Mavety returned to the IHL with the Port Huron Flags, earning 18 points (4G-14A) in 23 games, and he added an assist in seven playoff games. Mavety returned in 1965–66, and recorded 62 points (19G-43A) in 69 games with the Flags, and added 12 points (3G-9A) in nine playoff games as the Flags won the Turner Cup. Following the season, Mavety was named to the IHL Second All-Star Team. In 1966–67, Mavety again improved his numbers with 73 points (25G-48A) in 71 games with Port Huron, as he won the Governor's Trophy as the best defenceman in the IHL and was named to the IHL First All-Star Team. Despite his great season, the Flags did not qualify for the playoffs.

=== Vancouver Canucks (1967–1968) ===
In 1967–68, Mavety joined the Vancouver Canucks of the Western Hockey League (WHL), and he recorded 25 points (2G-23A), along with 148 PIM in 72 games, as the Canucks failed to make the playoffs.

=== Denver Spurs (1968–1971) ===
Mavety moved on with the Denver Spurs, of the WHL, and in his first season with the team, Mavety had 33 points (5G-28A) in 74 games as the team did not make the playoffs. In 1969–70, Mavety recorded 57 points (10G-47A) in 72 games, and again the Spurs failed to make the playoffs. Mavety was named to the WHL Second All-Star Team after the season. Mavety returned to Denver for the 1970–71 season, and finished second in team scoring with 63 points (18G-45A) in 71 games as the Spurs qualified for the playoffs. He added four points in five playoff games. Mavety was named to the WHL Second All-Star Team for the second consecutive season in 1971.

=== Salt Lake Golden Eagles (1971–1972) ===
In 1971–72, Mavety joined the Salt Lake Golden Eagles, and recorded 53 points (15G-38A) in 62 games. The Eagles failed to qualify for the post-season.

=== Los Angeles Sharks (1972–1973) ===
With the World Hockey Association (WHA) beginning play in 1972–73, Mavety began the season with the Los Angeles Sharks, however he played only two games with the club, scoring a goal.

=== Philadelphia Blazers (1972–1973) ===
Mavety moved on to the Philadelphia Blazers, where he went pointless in four games during the 1972–73 season.

=== Chicago Cougars (1972–1975) ===
Mavety found a home with the Chicago Cougars in 1972–73, where he had 49 points (9G-40A) in 67 games. He returned to the Cougars for the 1973–74 season, registering 51 points (15G-36A) in 77 games and helped the club make the post-season. The Cougars then upset the defending champion New England Whalers in the division semi-finals, then beat heavily favoured Toronto Toros in the division finals before losing to the Houston Aeros in the Avco Cup Finals. Mavety had 12 points (4G-8A) in 18 playoff games.

In 1974–75, Mavety earned 32 points (10G-22A) in 57 games with the Cougars. He also spent a few games with the Long Island Cougars of the North American Hockey League (NAHL), playing in four games and scoring two goals before being traded to the Toronto Toros.

=== Toronto Toros (1974–1975) ===
He played in 17 games with the Toros, recording nine points (0G-9A), helping them to the playoffs. In six playoff games, Mavety registered three assists as the Toros lost in the first round.

=== Denver Spurs (1975–1976) ===
Mavety split the 1975–76 season between the Erie Blades of the NAHL, getting 24 points (7G-17A) in 24 games, the Broome Dusters, also of the NAHL, recording 36 points (14G-22A) in 31 games, and the Denver Spurs of the WHA, getting four points (0G-4A) in 14 games.

=== Indianapolis Racers (1976–1977) ===
He then spent the majority of the 1976–77 season with the Dusters again, getting 67 points (16G-51A) in 59 games, and he also spent 10 games with the Indianapolis Racers of the WHA, getting four points (2G-2A). With the Dusters in the playoffs, Mavety had 10 points (1G-9A) in 10 games. Mavety then retired from professional hockey after the season.

== Career statistics ==
			Regular Season					Playoffs
Season	Team	League	GP	G	A	Pts	PIM	GP	G	A	Pts	PIM
1960–61	St. Catharines Teepees	OHA	6	0	0	0	4	–	–	–	–	–
1961–62	Belleville Bobcats	EJBHL	34	14	30	44	132	–	–	–	–	–
1962–63	Timmins Flyers	U18 A	5	0	3	3	8	–	–	–	–	–
1963–64	Toledo Blades	IHL	70	6	14	20	133	13	1	1	2	16
1964–65	Port Huron Flags	IHL	23	4	14	18	61	7	0	1	1	6
1965–66	Port Huron Flags	IHL	69	19	43	62	141	9	3	9	12	28
1966–67	Port Huron Flags	IHL	71	25	48	73	168	–	–	–	–	–
1967–68	Vancouver Canucks	WHL	72	2	23	25	148	–	–	–	–	–
1968–69	Denver Spurs	WHL	74	5	28	33	137	–	–	–	–	–
1969–70	Denver Spurs	WHL	72	10	47	57	123	–	–	–	–	–
1970–71	Denver Spurs	WHL	71	18	45	63	100	5	0	4	4	2
1971–72	Salt Lake Golden Eagles	WHL	62	15	38	53	114	–	–	–	–	–
1972–73	Los Angeles Sharks	WHA	2	1	0	1	2	–	–	–	–	–
1972–73	Philadelphia Blazers	WHA	4	0	0	0	14	–	–	–	–	–
1972–73	Chicago Cougars	WHA	67	9	40	49	73	–	–	–	–	–
1973–74	Chicago Cougars	WHA	77	15	36	51	157	18	4	8	12	46
1974–75	Chicago Cougars	WHA	57	10	22	32	126	–	–	–	–	–
1974–75	Long Island Cougars	NAHL	4	2	0	2	4	–	–	–	–	–
1974–75	Toronto Toros	WHA	17	0	9	9	24	6	0	3	3	6
1975–76	Denver Spurs	WHA	14	0	4	4	14	–	–	–	–	–
1975–76	Erie Blades	NAHL	24	7	17	24	30	–	–	–	–	–
1975–76	Broome Dusters	NAHL	31	14	22	36	50	–	–	–	–	–
1976–77	Indianapolis Racers	WHA	10	2	2	4	8	–	–	–	–	–
1976–77	Broome Dusters	NAHL	59	16	51	67	83	10	1	9	10	4
1977–78	Brantford Alexanders	OHA Sr.	39	9	31	40	36	–	–	–	–	–
WHA Totals			248	37	113	150	418	24	4	11	15	52

== Coaching career ==
=== Belleville Bulls (1979–1988) ===
In 1979–80, Mavety was hired by the Belleville Bulls, an expansion junior tier II team in the OHA. He led the club to a 24–18–2 record. In 1980–81, he led the Bulls to a 35–7–2 record, as the team won the league championship, defeating the Guelph Platers. The Bulls then went on to play for the national championship for the Manitoba Centennial Trophy, losing to the Prince Albert Raiders in the final game.

In 1981–82, the Bulls moved to the Ontario Hockey League (OHL) as an expansion team, where they finished the year with a 24–42–2 record, and missed the playoffs. In 1982–83, the Bulls improved to a 34–36–0 record and qualified for the playoffs for the first time, as the club lost to the Oshawa Generals in the first round. In 1983–84, the Bulls had a 33–37–0 record, making the playoffs again, and lost in the first round to the Generals again.

In 1984–85, the Bulls had their first winning season with a 42–24–0 record. They had another rematch against the Generals, this time beating them in five games. In the second round, they got past the Cornwall Royals, before falling to the Peterborough Petes in the division finals.

The 1985–86 Bulls had another winning season, this time with a 37–27–2 record. The Bulls defeated Cornwall in the 1st round, tied with Peterborough in a round-robin matchup against the Kingston Canadians, defeated Peterborough in the division finals, before losing to the Guelph Platers in the J. Ross Robertson Cup finals.

The 1986–87 season was a rebuilding one for the Bulls, who had a 26–39–1 record, and lost to Kingston in the first round. In 1987–88, the Bulls rebounded with a 32–30–4 record, but again lost in the first round, this time to Cornwall.

=== Kingston Raiders/Frontenacs (1988–1990) ===
In 1988 Mavety left the Bulls and joined the newly renamed Kingston Raiders (previously the Kingston Canadians) as head coach. The club finished the 1988–89 season with a 25–36–5 record, failing to qualify for the playoffs. In the summer of 1989, the Raiders were renamed again (under new ownership) to the Kingston Frontenacs, and in 1989–90, the Frontenacs finished with a 42–21–3 record, and Mavety won the OHL Coach of the Year award. The Fronts had a disappointing playoff though, losing in seven games in the opening round to Mavety's former team, the Belleville Bulls.

=== Belleville Bulls (1990–1997) ===
For the 1990–91 season, Mavety returned to coach the Bulls, who finished with a 38–21–7 record, and lost to the Ottawa 67's in the first round of the playoffs. In 1991–92, the Bulls fell to a 27–27–12 record, losing to the North Bay Centennials in the opening round. The 1992–93 Bulls had a rough season, finishing with a 21–34–11 record, and lost to the Generals in the first round.

In 1993–94, the Bulls finished with a winning record, with a 32–28–6 record, and defeated the Frontenacs in the first round, the first time since 1986 that Mavety won a playoff round. The Bulls then fell to the Centennials in the second round. The 1994–95 Bulls had a 32–31–3 record, and won their opening round against North Bay, then defeated Kingston before losing to the Guelph Storm in the third round. In 1995–96, Belleville had a 35–26–5 record, and defeated Oshawa in the first round, Ottawa in the second round, before falling to Guelph in the third round. in 1996–97, the Bulls slumped to a 22–37–7 record, and lost to Ottawa in the first round.

=== Kingston Frontenacs (1997–2020) ===
In 1997, Mavety returned to the Kingston Frontenacs as head coach and general manager. The club finished the 1997–98 season with a 35–27–4, earning 74 points, and placing in third place in the East Division. Kingston won their opening round playoff series, defeating the Oshawa Generals in seven games, before falling to the London Knights in the second round.

Kingston struggled to a 22–42–4 record during the 1998–99 season, however, the club reached the post-season in the eighth seed in the Eastern Conference. In the post-season, the Frontenacs lost to the first place Barrie Colts in the Eastern Conference quarter-finals.

During the summer of 1999, Mavety acquired goaltender Andrew Raycroft in a trade with the Sudbury Wolves. The stellar goaltending from Raycroft helped the Frontenacs to an impressive 38–22–5–3 record during the 1999–2000 season, as the club finished in fifth place in the Eastern Conference. In the post-season, the Frontenacs lost to the Sudbury Wolves in the Eastern Conference quarter-finals.

The Frontenacs slipped back into eighth place in the Eastern Conference during the 2000–01 season, as the team finished the season with a 28–28–11–1, earning 68 points. The club earned their fourth consecutive playoff berth since Mavety returned, however, Kingston was swept in the Eastern Conference quarter-finals by the Belleville Bulls.

Kingston began a rebuilding effort in the 2001–02, as many of their top players from the previous season graduated from junior hockey. Kingston slumped to a record of 18–37–9–4, earning 49 points, which placed them into an eighth place tie with the North Bay Centennials, forcing a one-game tie-breaker between the two clubs. The Frontenacs took a 2–0 lead into the third period of the game, however, the Centennials responded back with six unanswered goals, defeating Kingston 6–2 and making it the first time that the club had failed to qualify for the post-season since the 1991–92 season.

Mavety began the 2002–03 as the Frontenacs head coach, however, after a dismal 10–18–0–3 record after 31 games, Mavety resigned as head coach, focusing solely on his general manager duties. Assistant coach Greg Bignell was named the interim head coach for the club. Kingston finished the season with a 25–37–2–4 record, earning 56 points, however, the club finished in ninth place in the Eastern Conference, failing to qualify for the post-season for the second consecutive season.

During the off-season in 2003, Mavety named Jim Hulton as the new head coach of the team. Hulton had previously worked as the head coach of the Belleville Bulls for three seasons, from 2000 to 2003. The Frontenacs returned to the post-season during the 2003–04, as the club finished the season with a 30–28–7–3 record, earning 70 points and fifth place in the Eastern Conference. The Frontenacs lost to the Barrie Colts in the Eastern Conference quarter-finals in five games.

The Frontenacs slumped during the 2004–05, as the club finished the season with a 28–33–4–3 record, earning 63 points and failing to qualify for the post-season for the third time in four seasons with a ninth-place finish in the Eastern Conference.

Kingston broke out in the 2005–06, as the Frontenacs finished the season with a 37–24–7 record, earning 81 points and finishing in fourth place in the Eastern Conference. In the opening round of the post-season, the Frontenacs were viewed as favourites to defeat the Sudbury Wolves, however, the Wolves defeated Kingston in six games, extending Kingston's playoff drought to eight seasons without a series victory. Following the season, Mavety fired head coach Jim Hulton and hired former Washington Capitals head coach Bruce Cassidy as his replacement.

The Frontenacs were expected to improve on their previous season, however, in 2006–07, the Frontenacs finished the season with a 31–30–7 record, earning 69 points, which was a 12-point decrease from the previous season. Kingston finished in fifth place in the Eastern Conference and lost to the Oshawa Generals in five games in the Eastern Conference quarter-finals.

In 2007–08, after the Frontenacs started the season with a poor 2–9–1 record in their first 12 games, Mavety relieved Bruce Cassidy of his duties, as he named himself the head coach of the club for the remainder of the season. Under Mavety, the Frontenacs earned a 23–32–1 record, bringing their overall record to 25–41–2, as the club failed to qualify for the post-season after finishing in ninth place in the Eastern Conference.

Mavety remained as the Frontenacs head coach at the start of the 2008–09 season, however, after a 5–13–5 start to the season, he once again resigned as head coach of the Frontenacs to focus solely on his general manager duties. Mavety named former NHL player and Kingston-native Doug Gilmour as head coach of the team. Gilmour had been an assistant coach with the Toronto Marlies of the American Hockey League to start the 2008–09 season. Under Gilmour, the rebuilding club earned a record of 13–27–5 record, as Kingston finished with an overall record of 18–40–10, finishing in tenth place in the Eastern Conference, missing the playoffs for a second consecutive season.

Kingston improved dramatically during the 2009–10 season, as the club earned a 33–30–5 record, earning 71 points, and fourth place in the Eastern Conference. In the post-season, the Frontenacs and the Brampton Battalion played a thrilling seven-game series in the Eastern Conference quarter-finals, however, the Battalion defeated the Frontenacs 5–2 in the seventh game of the series, eliminating Kingston from the playoffs.

The Frontenacs were considered contenders for the 2010–11, however, Kingston struggled with injuries and slumped to a 29–30–9 record during the regular season, earning 67 points and a fifth-place finish in the Eastern Conference standings. In the post-season, the Oshawa Generals easily defeated the Frontenacs in five games in the Eastern Conference quarter-finals.

Following the 2010–11 season, Mavety stepped down as the Frontenacs general manager, as Doug Gilmour was named to replace him. Mavety has remained with the Frontenacs until his death in 2020. His last position with the team was senior consultant.

== Coaching record ==
Team	Year	Regular season							Postseason
Team	Year	G	W	L	T	OTL	Pts	Finish	Result
Belleville Bulls	1981–82	68	24	42	12	-	60	7th in Leyden	Missed playoffs
Belleville Bulls	1982–83	70	34	36	0	-	68	6th in Leyden	Lost in division quarter-finals (1–7 vs. OSH)
Belleville Bulls	1983–84	70	33	37	0	-	66	5th in Leyden	Lost in division quarter-finals (0–6 vs. OSH)
Belleville Bulls	1984–85	66	42	24	0	-	84	2nd in Leyden	Won in division quarter-finals (8–2 vs. OSH); Won in division semi-finals (6–2 vs. COR); Lost in division finals (1–9 vs. PBO)
Belleville Bulls	1985–86	66	37	27	2	-	76	2nd in Leyden	Won in division quarter-finals (9–3 vs. COR); Won in division semi-finals (4 pts. in round robin vs. PBO & KGN); Won in division finals (9–7 vs. PBO); Lost in J. Ross Robertson Cup finals (4–8 vs. GUE)
Belleville Bulls	1986–87	66	26	39	1	-	53	5th in Leyden	Lost in division quarter-finals (2–4 vs. KGN)
Belleville Bulls	1987–88	66	32	30	4	-	68	4th in Leyden	Lost in division quarter-finals (2–4 vs. COR)
Kingston Raiders	1988–89	66	25	36	5	-	59	7th in Leyden	Missed playoffs
Kingston Frontenacs	1989–90	66	42	21	3	-	87	2nd in Leyden	Lost in division quarter-finals (3–4 vs. BEL)
Belleville Bulls	1990–91	66	38	29	7	-	83	3rd in Leyden	Lost in division quarter-finals (2–4 vs. OTT)
Belleville Bulls	1991–92	66	27	27	12	-	66	6th in Leyden	Lost in division quarter-finals (1–4 vs. NB)
Belleville Bulls	1992–93	66	21	34	11	-	53	6th in Leyden	Lost in division quarter-finals (3–4 vs. OSH)
Belleville Bulls	1993–94	66	32	28	6	-	70	4th in Leyden	Won in division quarter-finals (4–2 vs. KGN); Lost in division semi-finals (2–4 vs. NB)
Belleville Bulls	1994–95	66	32	31	3	-	67	4th in Eastern	Won in division quarter-finals (4–2 vs. NB); Won in OHL quarter-finals (4–3 vs. KGN); Lost in OHL semi-finals (0–4 vs. GUE)
Belleville Bulls	1995–96	66	35	26	5	-	75	3rd in Eastern	Won in division quarter-finals (4–1 vs. OSH); Won in OHL quarter-finals (4–0 vs. OTT); Lost in OHL semi-finals (1–4 vs. GUE)
Belleville Bulls	1996–97	66	22	37	7	-	51	5th in Eastern	Lost in division quarter-finals (2–4 vs. OTT)
Kingston Frontenacs	1997–98	66	35	27	4	-	74	3rd in Eastern	Won in division quarter-finals (4–3 vs. OSH); Lost in OHL quarter-finals (1–4 vs. LDN)
Kingston Frontenacs	1998–99	68	22	42	4	-	48	5th in East	Lost in conference quarter-finals (1–4 vs. BAR)
Kingston Frontenacs	1999–2000	68	38	22	5	3	84	3rd in East	Lost in conference quarter-finals (1–4 vs. SBY)
Kingston Frontenacs	2000–01	68	28	28	11	1	68	4th in East	Lost in conference quarter-finals (0–4 vs. BEL)
Kingston Frontenacs	2001–02	68	18	37	9	4	49	5th in East	Missed playoffs
Kingston Frontenacs	2002–03	31	10	18	0	3	(56)	5th in East	Resigned
Kingston Frontenacs	2007–08	56	23	32	-	1	(52)	5th in East	Missed playoffs
Kingston Frontenacs	2008–09	23	5	13	-	5	15	5th in East	Resigned
Belleville totals	1981–1997	952	435	447	70	-	940		53–65–6 (0.452)
Kingston totals	1988–2009	580	246	276	41	17	550		10–23 (0.303)
OHL totals	1981–2009	1532	681	723	111	17	1490		63–88–6 (0.420)

== Death ==
Mavety died in Kingston on December 4, 2020, at the age of 78.

Preceded by none	Head Coaches of the Belleville Bulls; 1981–1988	Succeeded by Danny Flynn
Preceded by Jim Dorey	Head Coaches of the Kingston Raiders/Frontenacs; 1988–1990	Succeeded by Randy Hall
Preceded by Shawn Mackenzie	Head Coaches of the Belleville Bulls; 1990–1997	Succeeded by Lou Crawford
Preceded by Gary Agnew	Head Coaches of the Kingston Frontenacs; 1997–2003	Succeeded by Greg Bignell
Preceded by Bruce Cassidy	Head Coaches of the Kingston Frontenacs; 2007–2009	Succeeded by Doug Gilmour
