= Tony Cimellaro =

Canadian ice hockey player

- Born: June 14, 1971 (age 54) Kingston, Ontario, Canada
- Height: 6 ft 0 in (183 cm)
- Weight: 190 lb (86 kg; 13 st 8 lb)
- Position: Centre
- Shot: Left
- Played for: Ottawa Senators
- NHL draft: Undrafted
- Playing career: 1992–2000

Tony Cimellaro (born June 14, 1971) is a Canadian former professional ice hockey player who played two games in the National Hockey League for the Ottawa Senators during the 1992–93 NHL season.

== Playing career ==
Cimellaro also played in various European leagues, beginning in 1993 with a spell in Serie A with Asiago followed by a season in the British National League for the Durham Wasps and the Blackburn Hawks. He then moved to Denmark to play in the Oddset Ligaen for Vojens IK followed by two seasons in Germany, playing for the Ratingen Löwen in the Deutsche Eishockey Liga and Adendorfer EC of the German 1. Liga Nord before returning to North America.

Cimellaro spent two seasons in the Western Professional Hockey League with the Waco Wizards as a player/coach before finishing his career in the United Hockey League with the Adirondack IceHawks after the WPHL folded. Since 2003 he has been the assistant coach of the Kingston Frontenacs in the Ontario Hockey League. He has taken an assistant coaching position with the AHL Belleville Senators.

== Career statistics ==
=== Regular season and playoffs ===
			Regular season					Playoffs
Season	Team	League	GP	G	A	Pts	PIM	GP	G	A	Pts	PIM
1988–89	North Bay Centennials	OHL	11	2	1	3	7	—	—	—	—	—
1988–89	Kingston Raiders	OHL	47	6	7	13	12	—	—	—	—	—
1989–90	Kingston Frontenacs	OHL	62	8	31	39	26	7	1	4	5	2
1990–91	Kingston Frontenacs	OHL	64	26	25	51	42	—	—	—	—	—
1991–92	Belleville Bulls	OHL	48	39	44	83	61	5	6	4	10	10
1992–93	New Haven Senators	AHL	76	18	16	34	73	—	—	—	—	—
1992–93	Ottawa Senators	NHL	2	0	0	0	0	—	—	—	—	—
1993–94	P.E.I Senators	AHL	19	1	0	1	30	—	—	—	—	—
1993–94	Asiago	ITA	16	16	11	27	13	—	—	—	—	—
1994–95	Durham Wasps	BHL	4	2	5	7	10	—	—	—	—	—
1994–95	Blackburn Hawks	BD1	24	40	33	73	76	—	—	—	—	—
1995–96	Voyens IK	DEN	40	38	27	65	87	—	—	—	—	—
1996–97	EC Ratingen	DEL	48	5	11	16	44	—	—	—	—	—
1997–98	Adendorfer EC	GER-2	32	12	20	32	97	18	13	19	32	34
1998–99	Waco Wizards	WPHL	61	28	54	82	110	4	2	1	3	4
1999–00	Waco Wizards	WPHL	27	14	15	29	52	—	—	—	—	—
1999–00	Adirondack IceHawks	UHL	46	11	24	35	46	2	0	0	0	0
2004–05	Tamworth Braves	EOSHL	6	3	3	6	6	—	—	—	—	—
2005–06	Kingston Aces	EOSHL	7	6	6	12	6	2	1	2	3	12
NHL totals			2	0	0	0	0	—	—	—	—	—

== Coaching career ==
From 2003 to 2010, he was an assistant coach with his former junior team, the Kingston Frontenacs in the Ontario Hockey League. He then was hired as an assistant coach with Queen's University Golden Gaels. In December 2017, he was brought in as a midseason replacement assistant coach with the Belleville Senators on the American Hockey League, but was not kept the following season.
