= Monroe Moccasins (FPHL) =

- City: Monroe, Louisiana
- League: Federal Prospects Hockey League
- Division: Continental
- Founded: 2024
- Home arena: Monroe Civic Center
- Colors: Claret, Chamoisee, Cafe Noir, Black
- Owner: Perkin Hockey Group
- President: Nic Perkin
- Head coach: Russ Parent
- Website: moccasinshockey.com

The Monroe Moccasins are a professional ice hockey team based in Monroe, Louisiana. They play at the Monroe Civic Center and are a member of the Federal Prospects Hockey League. Their inaugural season is the 2024–25 season. The franchise is named after the original Monroe Moccasins who played in the Western Professional Hockey League from 1997 to 2001. The team maintains an affiliation agreement with the Summit City Distillers of the American Premier Hockey League, a senior ice hockey league.

== History ==
The Moccasins were announced on June 5, 2024, during a press conference held at the Monroe Civic Center. The team is owned by Perkin Hockey Group, led by New Orleans–based businessman Nicolas Perkin. They played their first game on October 11, 2024, against the Athens Rock Lobsters, losing 7–2. Brad Reitter scored the first goal in the franchise's history.

== Season-by-season results ==
Regular season												Playoffs		
Season	GP	W	L	OTL	Pts (Note: The FHL awards 3 points for a regulation time win, 2 points for an overtime win, and 1 point for an overtime or shootout loss)	Pct	GF	GA	PIM	Finish	Head coach	Quarterfinals	Semifinals	Finals
2024–25	56	22	25	9	71	.423	185	199	1014	6th - Continental Div. 10th - Overall	Todd McIlrath (Note: McIlrath was fired after 0–1–0 start.); Justin Levac (Note: Levac resigned after 5–6–4 start.); Gary Gill	Did not qualify		
2025-26	56	38	10	8	119	.708	275	180	1470	2nd- Continental Div. 3rd- Overall	Russ Parent	L, 2–1 Columbus		

== Attendance ==
Average per game:

- 2024–25: 4,519
- 2025–26: 4,132

Total:

- 2024–25: 126,538
- 2025–26: 115,682 | FPHL Playoffs: 6,463
