= Rob Murray =

Canadian ice hockey player and coach (born 1967)

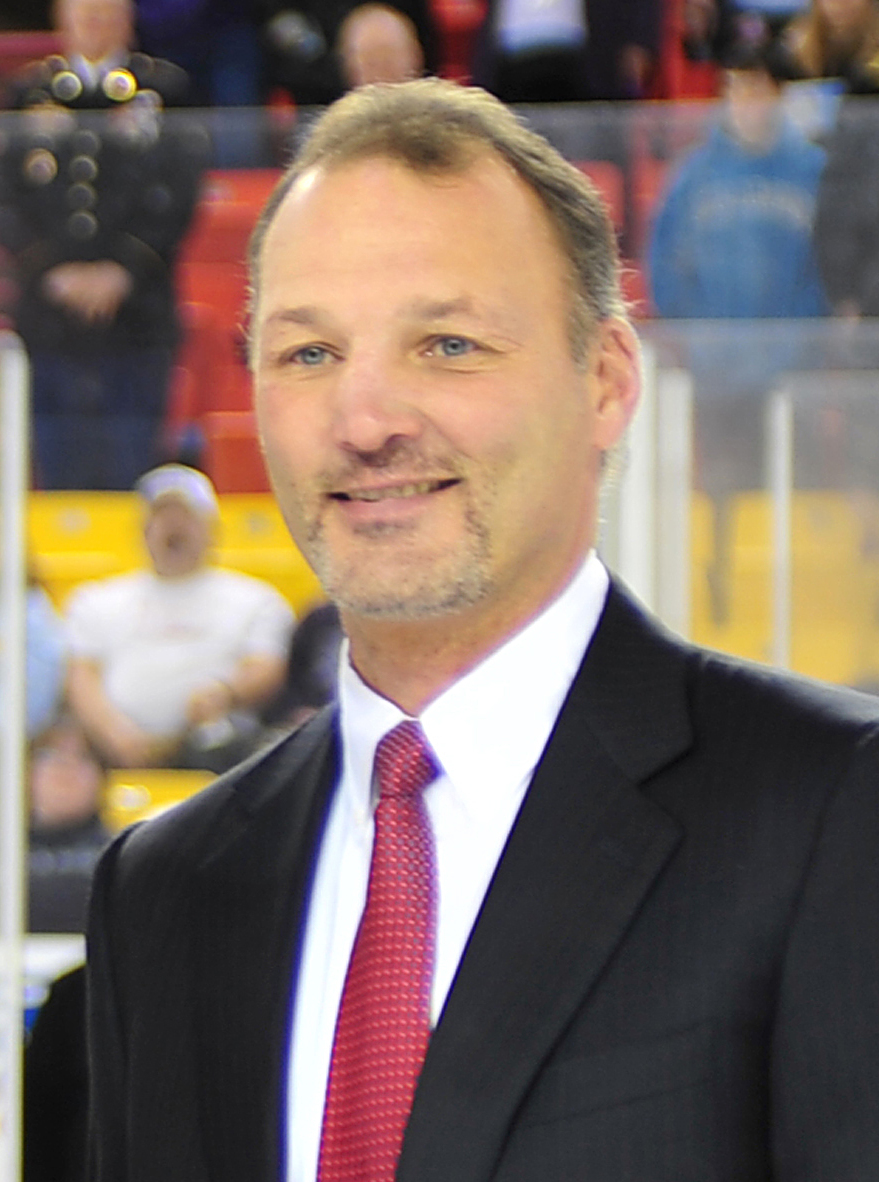
- Murray in 2011
- Born: April 4, 1967 (age 59) Toronto, Ontario, Canada
- Height: 6 ft 1 in (185 cm)
- Weight: 180 lb (82 kg; 12 st 12 lb)
- Position: Centre
- Shot: Right
- Played for: NHL; Washington Capitals; Winnipeg Jets; Phoenix Coyotes; IHL; Fort Wayne Komets; AHL; Baltimore Skipjacks; Moncton Hawks; Springfield Falcons; Hamilton Bulldogs; Philadelphia Phantoms; Saint John Flames
- NHL draft: 61st overall, 1985; Washington Capitals
- Playing career: 1987–2003

Robert Allan Murray (born April 4, 1967) is a Canadian former professional ice hockey player. He is the head coach of the Tulsa Oilers of the ECHL. Murray played much of his career as captain of the American Hockey League's Springfield Falcons. He holds team records in single season penalty minutes (373), career assists (157), penalty minutes (1529), and games (501). His number 23 was retired by the Falcons, and remains honored by the successor team in the market, the Springfield Thunderbirds.

== Playing career ==
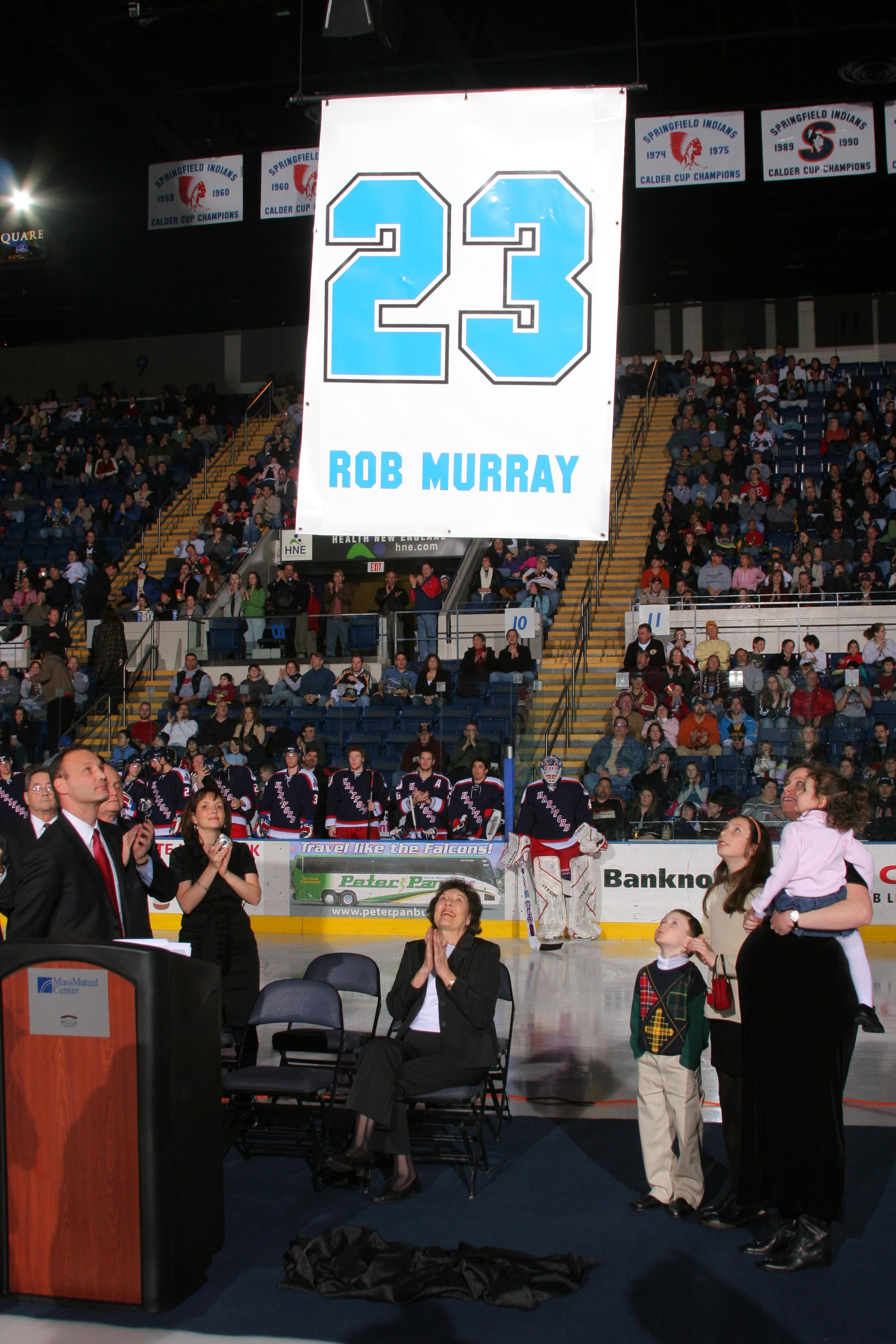
Murray (far left) during his jersey retirement in 2007

As a youth, Murray played in the 1980 Quebec International Pee-Wee Hockey Tournament with the Toronto Marlboros minor ice hockey team.

Selected by the Washington Capitals in the 1985 NHL entry draft, Murray played parts of two seasons for the Capitals. At the end of the 1990–91 season, he was claimed by the Minnesota North Stars and was traded the very next day to the Winnipeg Jets. Murray would spend most of his time in the Jets' minor league affiliates; first the Moncton Hawks for three seasons, and then the Springfield Falcons for eight, for which he is the career games leader and longtime captain.

Following the Jets' franchise when it relocated to Phoenix, Murray would spend parts of two seasons until he was traded to the Edmonton Oilers although he would never actually play a game for the franchise. He retired from active play in 2003.

Murray was at one time the career penalty minute leader in the AHL, but has since been surpassed by Dennis Bonvie; he remains in second place in league history with 2940. In 2017, he was named to the AHL Hall of Fame.

== Coaching career ==
After retirement, Murray was hired as an assistant coach for the Providence Bruins and was named their head coach in 2008 following Scott Gordon's hiring by the New York Islanders. He was let go following the 2010–11 season. On July 13, 2011, he was named the head coach of the Alaska Aces of the ECHL where he remained for six seasons. His Aces teams won three Brabham Cups for the best regular season records and one Kelly Cup for the playoff championship in 2014. He stayed with the Aces until the team folded following the 2016–17 season. He was then named head coach of the Tulsa Oilers in June 2017.

== Career statistics ==
=== Regular season and playoffs ===
			Regular season					Playoffs
Season	Team	League	GP	G	A	Pts	PIM	GP	G	A	Pts	PIM
1983–84	Mississauga Reps U18 AAA	GTHL	35	18	36	54	32	—	—	—	—	—
1984–85	Peterborough Petes	OHL	63	12	9	21	155	17	2	7	9	45
1985–86	Peterborough Petes	OHL	52	14	18	32	125	16	1	2	3	50
1986–87	Peterborough Petes	OHL	62	17	37	54	204	3	1	4	5	8
1987–88	Fort Wayne Komets	IHL	80	12	21	33	139	6	0	2	2	16
1988–89	Baltimore Skipjacks	AHL	80	11	23	34	235	—	—	—	—	—
1989–90	Washington Capitals	NHL	41	2	7	9	58	9	0	0	0	18
1989–90	Baltimore Skipjacks	AHL	23	5	4	9	63	—	—	—	—	—
1990–91	Washington Capitals	NHL	17	0	3	3	19	—	—	—	—	—
1990–91	Baltimore Skipjacks	AHL	48	6	20	26	177	4	0	0	0	12
1991–92	Winnipeg Jets	NHL	9	0	1	1	18	—	—	—	—	—
1991–92	Moncton Hawks	AHL	60	16	15	31	247	8	0	1	1	56
1992–93	Winnipeg Jets	NHL	10	1	0	1	6	—	—	—	—	—
1992–93	Moncton Hawks	AHL	56	16	21	37	147	3	0	0	0	6
1993–94	Winnipeg Jets	NHL	6	0	0	0	2	—	—	—	—	—
1993–94	Moncton Hawks	AHL	69	25	32	57	280	21	2	3	5	60
1994–95	Winnipeg Jets	NHL	10	0	2	2	2	—	—	—	—	—
1994–95	Springfield Falcons	AHL	78	16	38	54	373	—	—	—	—	—
1995–96	Winnipeg Jets	NHL	1	0	0	0	2	—	—	—	—	—
1995–96	Springfield Falcons	AHL	74	10	28	38	263	10	1	6	7	32
1996–97	Springfield Falcons	AHL	78	16	27	43	234	17	2	3	5	66
1997–98	Springfield Falcons	AHL	80	7	30	37	255	4	0	2	2	2
1998–99	Phoenix Coyotes	NHL	13	1	2	3	4	—	—	—	—	—
1998–99	Springfield Falcons	AHL	68	6	19	25	197	3	0	0	0	4
1999–00	Springfield Falcons	AHL	22	1	3	4	70	—	—	—	—	—
1999–00	Hamilton Bulldogs	AHL	55	11	20	31	100	10	2	3	5	4
2000–01	Philadelphia Phantoms	AHL	46	3	6	9	65	—	—	—	—	—
2000–01	Springfield Falcons	AHL	30	3	2	5	43	—	—	—	—	—
2001–02	Saint John Flames	AHL	80	7	14	21	97	—	—	—	—	—
2002–03	Springfield Falcons	AHL	71	2	10	12	94	6	0	2	2	4
AHL totals			1018	161	312	473	2940	86	7	20	27	246
NHL totals			107	4	15	19	111	9	0	0	0	18

Preceded by Scott Gordon	Providence Bruins Head Coach; 2008–2011	Succeeded by Bruce Cassidy
