= Scott Thornton (ice hockey) =

Canadian ice hockey player (born 1971)

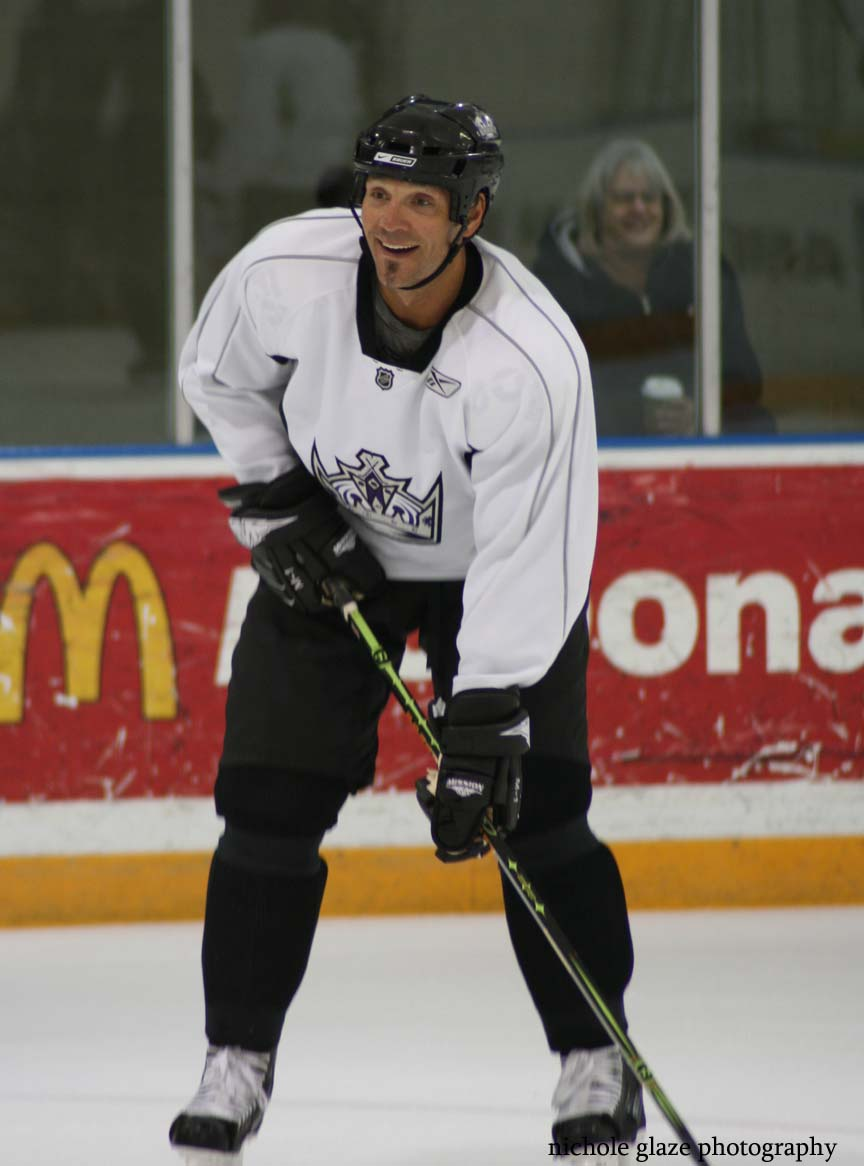
- Born: January 9, 1971 (age 55) London, Ontario, Canada
- Height: 6 ft 3 in (191 cm)
- Weight: 220 lb (100 kg; 15 st 10 lb)
- Position: Left wing
- Shot: Left
- Played for: Toronto Maple Leafs; Edmonton Oilers; Montreal Canadiens; Dallas Stars; San Jose Sharks; Los Angeles Kings
- National team: Canada
- NHL draft: 3rd overall, 1989; Toronto Maple Leafs
- Playing career: 1990–2008

Scott Christopher Thornton (born January 9, 1971) is a Canadian former professional ice hockey winger who played in the National Hockey League. Scott and former Sharks teammate Joe Thornton are first cousins.

== Playing career ==
Thornton was drafted in the first round (third overall) by the Toronto Maple Leafs in the 1989 NHL entry draft. He played thirty-three games for the team his rookie season, accumulating one goal and three assists. He also played left wing for the Edmonton Oilers, Montreal Canadiens, Dallas Stars and San Jose Sharks. He was signed by San Jose as a free agent on July 1, 2000. In his first season with San Jose, he had a career year, scoring twenty goals playing alongside gritty centre Mike Ricci.

He signed a two-year contract $3.42 million contract extension in the 2003–04 season. The first season of the extension coincided with the 2004–05 NHL lockout, and after the second year, Thornton became an unrestricted free agent when the Sharks declined to pick up the one-year team option in his contract. On July 1, 2006, he signed a 2-year, $3 million contract with the Los Angeles Kings. During the 2006–07 season, Thornton was placed on injured reserve due to a wrist injury and missed 23 games as a result.

Thornton announced his retirement on July 28, 2008.

== Personal ==
Since retirement Thornton currently resides in Collingwood, Ontario.

Thornton is cousin to former NHL superstar Joe Thornton.

== Career statistics ==
=== Regular season and playoffs ===
			Regular season					Playoffs
Season	Team	League	GP	G	A	Pts	PIM	GP	G	A	Pts	PIM
1985–86	London Sabres	OMHA	55	36	29	65	22	—	—	—	—	—
1986–87	London Nationals	WOHL	45	16	19	35	38	—	—	—	—	—
1987–88	Belleville Bulls	OHL	62	11	19	30	54	6	0	1	1	2
1988–89	Belleville Bulls	OHL	59	28	34	62	103	5	1	1	2	6
1989–90	Belleville Bulls	OHL	47	21	28	49	91	11	2	10	12	15
1990–91	Belleville Bulls	OHL	3	2	1	3	2	6	0	7	7	14
1990–91	Newmarket Saints	AHL	5	1	0	1	4	—	—	—	—	—
1990–91	Toronto Maple Leafs	NHL	33	1	3	4	30	—	—	—	—	—
1991–92	Cape Breton Oilers	AHL	49	9	14	23	40	5	1	0	1	8
1991–92	Edmonton Oilers	NHL	15	0	1	1	43	1	0	0	0	0
1992–93	Cape Breton Oilers	AHL	58	23	27	50	102	16	1	2	3	35
1992–93	Edmonton Oilers	NHL	9	0	1	1	0	—	—	—	—	—
1993–94	Cape Breton Oilers	AHL	2	1	1	2	31	—	—	—	—	—
1993–94	Edmonton Oilers	NHL	61	4	7	11	104	—	—	—	—	—
1994–95	Edmonton Oilers	NHL	47	10	12	22	89	—	—	—	—	—
1995–96	Edmonton Oilers	NHL	77	9	9	18	149	—	—	—	—	—
1996–97	Montreal Canadiens	NHL	73	10	10	20	128	5	1	0	1	2
1997–98	Montreal Canadiens	NHL	67	6	9	15	158	9	0	2	2	10
1998–99	Montreal Canadiens	NHL	47	7	4	11	87	—	—	—	—	—
1999–2000	Montreal Canadiens	NHL	35	2	3	5	70	—	—	—	—	—
1999–2000	Dallas Stars	NHL	30	6	3	9	38	23	2	7	9	38
2000–01	San Jose Sharks	NHL	73	19	17	36	114	6	3	0	3	8
2001–02	San Jose Sharks	NHL	77	26	16	42	116	12	3	3	6	6
2002–03	San Jose Sharks	NHL	41	9	12	21	41	—	—	—	—	—
2003–04	San Jose Sharks	NHL	80	13	14	27	84	12	2	2	4	22
2004–05	Södertälje SK	SEL	12	2	5	7	10	10	0	3	3	27
2005–06	San Jose Sharks	NHL	71	10	11	21	84	11	2	0	2	6
2006–07	Los Angeles Kings	NHL	58	7	6	13	85	—	—	—	—	—
2007–08	Los Angeles Kings	NHL	47	5	3	8	39	—	—	—	—	—
NHL totals			941	144	141	285	1459	79	13	14	27	82

=== International ===
Year	Team	Event	GP	G	A	Pts	PIM
1991	Canada	WJC	7	3	1	4	0
1999	Canada	WC	10	5	1	6	6

== See also ==
- Notable families in the NHL

Preceded by Scott Pearson	Toronto Maple Leafs first-round draft pick 1989	Succeeded by Rob Pearson
