= Murray Flegel =

Canadian ice hockey player

- Born: February 13, 1948 (age 78) Moose Jaw, Saskatchewan, Canada
- Height: 6 ft 1 in (185 cm)
- Weight: 190 lb (86 kg; 13 st 8 lb)
- Position: Defence
- Shot: Left
- Played for: Houston Apollos; Cleveland Barons; Kansas City Blues; Montreal Voyageurs; Salt Lake Golden Eagles; Baltimore Clippers; Muskegon Mohawks; Seattle Totems; Nova Scotia Voyageurs; Omaha Knights; Springfield Indians
- NHL draft: Undrafted
- Playing career: 1967–1977

Murray Flegel (born February 13, 1948) is a former ice hockey defenceman who played 10 seasons of professional hockey from 1967 to 1977.

Flegel played professionally in the American Hockey League with the Cleveland Barons, Montreal Voyageurs, Baltimore Clippers, Nova Scotia Voyageurs, and Springfield Indians.

During the 1976–77 season Flegel was the player-coach of the Kimberley Dynamiters in the WIHL.

== Awards ==
The IHL twice awarded Flegel the Governor's Trophy as the league's most outstanding defenceman during the 1974–75 and 1975–76 seasons when he was a member of the Muskegon Mohawks.
