= Jim Hulton =

Canadian ice hockey coach (born 1969)

- Born: January 7, 1969 (age 57) Kingston, Ontario, Canada
- Height: 6 ft 1 in (185 cm)
- Weight: 195 lb (88 kg; 13 st 13 lb)
- Position: Left wing
- Shot: Left
- Played for: OHL; Kitchener Rangers; Kingston Raiders; OUAA; York Yeomen
- Playing career: 1986–1993

Jim Hulton (born January 7, 1969) is a Canadian ice hockey executive who currently serves as the head coach of the Saint John Sea Dogs of the Quebec Maritimes Junior Hockey League (QMJHL). Hulton was previously an assistant coach with the Florida Panthers of the National Hockey League (NHL) and most recently the general manager & head coach for the QMJHL's Charlottetown Islanders.

== Playing career ==
=== Junior hockey ===
==== Kitchener Rangers (1986-1988) ====
Hulton was drafted in the seventh round, 100th overall, by the Kitchener Rangers of the Ontario Hockey League at the 1986 OHL Priority Selection.

Hulton appeared in 50 games with the Rangers during the 1986-87 season, scoring one goal and four points. He appeared in one playoff game, earning no points.

He returned to the Rangers for the 1987-88, as Hulton played in 65 games, scoring six goals and 12 points. In three post-season games, Hulton earned an assist.

==== Kingston Raiders (1988-1989) ====
Hulton joined the Kingston Raiders for the 1988-89 season. In 13 games with Kingston, Hulton scored a goal and five points.

=== College hockey ===
==== York Yeomen (1989-1993) ====
After his junior career, Hulton played for the York Yeomen of the OUAA from 1989 to 1993. In 1992–93, Hulton was named captain of the team.

== Coaching career ==
=== Kingston Voyageurs (1994-1996) ===
Hulton began his coaching career as an assistant coach with the Kingston Voyageurs of the Metro Junior A Hockey League in the 1994–95 season, as the club finished the season with a 21–24–5, earning 47 points, and finishing in ninth place.

The Voyageurs jumped to the Ontario Provincial Junior A Hockey League for the 1995-96 season, in which Hulton remained with the team as an assistant coach. The Voyageurs improved to a 37-10-3 record, earning 77 points and finishing in first place in the Ruddock Division. In the post-season, the Voyageurs were upset by the Lindsay Muskies in seven games in the second round.

=== St. Michael's Buzzers (1996-1997) ===
Hulton joined the St. Michael's Buzzers of the Ontario Provincial Junior A Hockey League for the 1996-97 season, working under head coach Michael Futa. The Buzzers finished the season with a 26-22-3 record, earning 55 points, and fourth place in the MacKenzie Division. In the post-season, the Buzzers lost to the Brampton Capitals in the first round.

Following the season, the Buzzers disbanded.

=== North Bay Centennials (1997-1998) ===
Hulton was hired by the North Bay Centennials of the Ontario Hockey League for the 1997-98 season as an assistant coach, working under head coach Greg Bignell. The Centennials struggled to a 15-45-6 record during the season, earning 36 points, and finishing in last place in the Central Division. The Centennials failed to qualify for the post-season.

Following the season, Hulton was relieved of his duties.

=== Kingston Voyageurs (1998-1999) ===
Hulton re-joined the Kingston Voyageurs of the Ontario Provincial Junior A Hockey League for the 1998-99 season, as he was hired as the head coach of the club. Previously, Hulton worked with the Voyageurs from 1994 to 1996 as an assistant coach. The Voyageurs got off to a very strong start to the season, going 18-6-1 in their first 25 games under Hulton, good for first place in the East Division.

After the solid start to the season, Hulton resigned from his position in Kingston to take the head coaching job of the Mississauga IceDogs of the Ontario Hockey League.

=== Mississauga IceDogs (1998-2000) ===
Hulton joined the Mississauga IceDogs of the Ontario Hockey League midway through the 1998-99, after the club began the season 1-21-1 under previous head coach Peter Sturgeon. On November 27, 1998, Hulton coached his first game with Mississauga, as the club earned a 3–3 tie with the Belleville Bulls. Hulton would not win his first game with Mississauga until January 29, 1999, as the IceDogs defeated the Peterborough Petes 5–2. Overall, Hulton finished the season with a 3-40-2 record with Mississauga, as the team finished in last place in the league.

Mississauga saw a slight improvement in Hulton's second season with the club, as the team finished the 1999-2000 season with a 9-56-1-2 record, earning 21 points. The club remained in last place in the OHL.

Following the season, the IceDogs and Hulton parted ways.

=== Belleville Bulls (2000-2003) ===
Hulton was hired by the Belleville Bulls of the Ontario Hockey League for the 2000-01 season as the head coach of the club. On September 23, 2000, Hulton coached his first game for Belleville, as they lost 3–2 to the Kingston Frontenacs. Four nights later, Hulton earned his first win with the Bulls, as they defeated his former club, the Mississauga IceDogs 8–7. The Bulls had a very strong season, as Hulton led them to a 37-23-5-3 record, earning 82 points, and finishing in first place in the Eastern Conference. On March 26, 2001, Hulton coached in his first career OHL post-season game, as Belleville hammered the Kingston Frontenacs 10–2. The Bulls swept the Frontenacs in the Eastern Conference quarter-finals, however, they were upset by the Ottawa 67's in the conference semi-finals.

The Bulls improved in Hulton's second season with the club, as in 2001-02, Belleville had a record of 39-23-4-2, earning 85 points, winning the East Division for the second consecutive season, and finishing in second place in the Eastern Conference. Belleville easily defeated the Oshawa Generals in five games in the Eastern Conference quarter-finals, however, Belleville lost to the Barrie Colts in the semi-finals.

Belleville slipped a bit in the 2002-03 season, however, the club finishing with a solid 33-27-6-2 record, earning 74 points, good for third place in the East Division and sixth in the Eastern Conference. The Bulls lost to the Toronto St. Michael's Majors in seven games in the Eastern Conference quarter-finals.

Following the 2002–03 season, Hulton resigned from his position with the club.

=== Kingston Frontenacs (2003-2006) ===
Following his resignation with the Belleville Bulls, the Kingston Frontenacs of the Ontario Hockey League quickly hired Hulton to a contract to become their head coach. On September 20, 2003, Hulton coached his first game with Kingston, as they tied the Barrie Colts 3-3. On October 1, Hulton earned his first win with the Frontenacs, as they defeated his previous club, the Belleville Bulls 4–3. The Frontenacs finished the 2003-04 season with a 30-28-7-3, earning 70 points, second place in the East Division, and fifth in the Eastern Conference. This marked a 14-point improvement for Kingston over the previous season. In the post-season, the Frontenacs lost to the Barrie Colts in five games during the Eastern Conference quarter-finals.

The Frontenacs struggled during Hulton's second season with the team in 2004-05, as Kingston dropped to 28-33-4-3, earning 63 points. Kingston failed to qualify for the post-season, as they finished in ninth place in the Eastern Conference.

Kingston saw significant improvement during the 2005-06, as the Frontenacs finished the year with a 37-24-4-3 record, earning 81 points and finishing in second place in the East Division. Kingston finished in fourth place in the Eastern Conference, and saw an 18-point improvement from the previous season. In the playoffs, the Frontenacs were upset by the Sudbury Wolves in the Eastern Conference quarter-finals, losing in six games.

Following the 2005–06 season, Hulton was relieved of his duties.

=== Royal Military College Paladins (2006-2007) ===
For the 2006–2007 season, Hulton, who interviewed for a few vacant head coaching jobs in the OHL, decided to take the head coaching job at Royal Military College, which is in Kingston, Ontario so he would not have to relocate his family.

The Paladins finished the 2006–07 season with a 7-16-4-1 record, finishing third in the Mid-East Division.

After the season, Hulton resigned from his position.

=== Mississauga St. Michael's Majors (2007-2008) ===
On May 1, 2007, Hulton was hired by the Ontario Hockey League Mississauga St. Michael's Majors as assistant coach and assistant general manager, working under Dave Cameron. The Majors finished 31–32–5, earning 67 points, in his only season with the team, finishing third in the Central Division and fifth in the Eastern Conference. Mississauga was swept by the Niagara IceDogs in the first round of the playoffs.

=== Florida Panthers (2008-2011) ===
Hulton was hired by the Florida Panthers of the National Hockey League on July 9, 2008, as an assistant coach of the club under head coach Peter DeBoer. In his first season with the Panthers in 2008–09, the club finished with a 41–30–11 record, earning 93 points, however, they finished in ninth place in the Eastern Conference, failing to qualify for the post-season.

Florida slumped in Hulton's second season as an assistant in 2009–10, as they slid to a 32–37–13 record, getting 77 points, and finishing in second last in the Eastern Conference, missing the post-season once again.

In 2010–11, the Panthers finished in last place in the Eastern Conference, posting a record of 30–40–12, earning 72 points. On April 10, 2011, the Panthers fired Hulton when they relieved head coach Peter DeBoer of his duties.

=== Tri-City Storm (2013-2015) ===
Hulton was named head coach and general manager of the Tri-City Storm of the USHL on November 19, 2013. Hulton took over for Josh Hauge, who was fired after starting the season 4–9–2. Hulton coached his first game with the Storm on November 22, as the team lost 2–0 to the Chicago Steel. Under Hulton, the Storm posted a record of 17–26–2, as the club failed to make the playoffs in the 2013-14 season.

In the 2014-15 season, the Storm improved tremendously, earning a record of 37–17–6, getting 80 points and finishing in second place in the Western Conference. In the post-season, the Storm swept the Omaha Lancers in the first round, however, in the second round, Tri-City was upset by the fourth seeded Sioux Falls Stampede.

=== Charlottetown Islanders (2015-2026) ===
On June 29, 2015, Hulton was named the head coach of the Charlottetown Islanders of the Quebec Major Junior Hockey League for the 2015-16 QMJHL season. On September 11, 2015, Hulton coached his first game with the Islanders, as the club defeated the Halifax Mooseheads 4–3 in a shootout. Charlottetown finished the season with a 35-26-7 record, earning 77 points and a fourth-place finish in the Maritimes Division, while finishing ninth in the overall league standings. In the post-season, the Islanders defeated the Rimouski Oceanic in six games in the first round, however, they lost to the Shawinigan Cataractes in six games in the QMJHL quarter-finals. On April 22, 2016, Hulton was also given general manager duties, replacing Grant Sonier.

Charlottetown saw improvement during the 2016-17 season, as the Islanders finished the season with a 46-18-4 record, earning 96 points, which was a 19-point improvement. Charlottetown finished in second place in the Maritimes Division, and fourth overall in the league. In the playoffs, the Islanders swept the Baie-Comeau Drakkar in the first round, followed by a sweep against the Cape Breton Screaming Eagles in the QMJHL quarter-finals. In the semi-finals, the Islanders lost to the Blainville-Boisbriand Armada in five games.

The Islanders slipped to a 37-24-7 record during the 2017-18 season, earning 81 points, finishing third in the Maritimes Division, and ninth in overall standings. In the post-season, the Islanders defeated the Quebec Remparts in the first round, then upset the heavily favoured Halifax Mooseheads in the QMJHL quarter-finals. In the semi-finals, the Islanders lost to the top ranked Blainville-Boisbriand Armada in seven games.

Charlottetown had a strong season in 2018-19, finishing the season with a 40-21-7 record, earning 87 points. The Islanders finished in second place in the Maritimes Division, and fourth in the Eastern Conference. In the Eastern Conference quarter-finals, the Islanders lost to the Cape Breton Screaming Eagles in six games.

== Coaching record ==
Team	Year	Regular season							Postseason
Team	Year	G	W	L	T	OTL	Pts	Finish	Result
MIS	1998–99	45	3	40	2	-	8	5th in Central	Missed Playoffs
MIS	1999–00	68	9	56	1	2	21	5th in Central	Missed Playoffs
BEL	2000–01	68	37	23	5	3	82	1st in East	Lost in Second Round
BEL	2001–02	68	39	23	4	2	84	1st in East	Lost in Second Round
BEL	2002–03	68	33	27	6	2	74	3rd in East	Lost in First Round
KGN	2003–04	68	30	28	7	3	70	2nd in East	Lost in First Round
KGN	2004–05	68	28	33	4	3	63	4th in East	Missed Playoffs
KGN	2005–06	68	37	24	-	7	81	2nd in East	Lost in First Round
TRI	2013–14	45	17	26	-	2	36	7th in Western	Missed Playoffs
TRI	2014–15	60	37	17	-	6	80	2nd in Western	Lost in Second Round
CHA	2015–16	68	35	26	-	7	77	3rd in Maritimes	Lost in Second Round
CHA	2016–17	68	46	18	-	4	96	2nd in Maritimes	Lost in Third Round
CHA	2017–18	68	37	24	-	7	81	3rd in Maritimes	Lost in Third Round
CHA	2018–19	68	40	21	-	7	87	2nd in Maritimes	Lost in First Round
CHA	2019–20	64	33	26	-	5	71	3rd in Maritimes	QMJHL playoffs cancelled due to COVID-19 pandemic
CHA	2020–21	40	35	5	-	0	70	1st in Maritimes	Lost in Third Round
CHA	2021–22	68	48	13	-	7	103	1st in Maritimes	Lost in Finals
CHA	2022–23	68	26	33	-	9	61	4th in Maritimes	Lost in First Round
CHA	2023–24	68	26	34	-	8	60	5th in Maritimes	Lost in First Round
CHA	2024–25	64	30	29	-	5	65	4th in Maritimes	Lost in First Round
CHA	2025–26	64	33	23	-	8	74	3rd in Maritimes	Lost in First Round
OHL totals	1998–2006	521	216	254	29	22	483		
USHL totals	2013–2015	105	54	43	-	8	116		
QMJHL totals	2015–present	708	389	252	-	67	845		

Preceded by Randy Sturgeon	Head coaches of the Mississauga IceDogs; 1998–2000	Succeeded by Geoff Ward
Preceded by Lou Crawford	Head coaches of the Belleville Bulls; 2000–2003	Succeeded by James Boyd
Preceded by Greg Bignell	Head Coaches of the Kingston Frontenacs; 2003–2006	Succeeded by Bruce Cassidy
Preceded by Josh Hauge	Head coaches of the Tri-City Storm; 2013–2015	Succeeded by Bill Muckalt
Preceded by Gordie Dwyer	Head coaches of the Charlottetown Islanders; 2015–present	Succeeded by incumbent
