= Monroe Moccasins =

American ice hockey team

- City: Monroe, Louisiana
- League: Western Professional Hockey League
- Founded: 1997
- Folded: 2001
- Home arena: Monroe Civic Center
- Colors: Green and yellow
- Owner(s): Todd Newman

The Monroe Moccasins were a professional ice hockey team that played in the Western Professional Hockey League. Based in Monroe, Louisiana from 1997 until the end of the 2001 season, the team played its home games at the Monroe Civic Center.

== History ==
Monroe was awarded an expansion franchise in May 1997 slated to begin play that October. After early troubles with ownership and securing home ice at the civic center, the team would begin the season by going 4-3 on the road before playing their first home game before a sold out crowd on November 8. Coached by Rob Bremner, the team would see moderate success for their inaugural season finishing one game out of the playoffs and averaging 3,178 fans per game.

Prior to the 1998-99 season, permanent ice was installed at the civic center allowing for the team to remain in Monroe. On the ice, the squad would see the franchise's first playoff berth. However with declining attendance, Rob Bremner was relieved of his coaching duties following the season.

For the 1999-00 season, former Moccasin Brian Curran was selected as head coach. Playing a more aggressive style, the team would advance once again to the playoffs where they would subsequently lose in the first round to Arkansas.

Leading into the 2000-01 season, the future of the franchise came into question as a result of the continual decline in attendance. By February 2000, the team was being kept afloat by the league itself. After falling severely short in securing 2,500 season tickets for the 2001-02 season with just 653 sold, the team would cease operation that June.

In 2024, it was announced that a new team would call Monroe home, the team is also named the Monroe Moccasins and will play in the Federal Prospects Hockey League starting in 2024-25.

== Year-by-year record ==
Year	GP	W	L	T	Playoffs	Home attendance
2000-01	70	34	27	9	Finished fifth, missed playoffs	1,924
1999-00	70	39	25	6	Finished third, lost in first round	2,296
1998-99	69	37	26	6	Finished third, lost in second round	2,535
1997-98	69	35	32	2	Finished sixth, missed playoffs	3,178
