= Kevin Willison =

Canadian ice hockey player (b. 1958)

- Born: May 21, 1958 (age 66); Calgary, Alberta, Canada
- Height: 5 ft 11 in (180 cm)
- Weight: 194 lb (88 kg; 13 st 12 lb)
- Position: Defence
- Shot: Left
- Played for: IHL; Port Huron Flags; Milwaukee Admirals; Muskegon Lumberjacks; CHL; Salt Lake Golden Eagles
- NHL draft: 72nd overall, 1978; St. Louis Blues
- Playing career: 1978–1986

Kevin Willison (born 21 May 1958) is a Canadian former ice hockey defenceman who played eight seasons of professional hockey from 1979 to 1986. He was drafted by the St. Louis Blues in the fifth round (72nd overall) of the 1978 NHL Amateur Draft, having played junior ice hockey with the WCHL's Calgary Centennials and Billings Bighorns.

Born in Calgary, Alberta, Willison played professionally in the International Hockey League with the Port Huron Flags (1978–79 and 1980–81), Milwaukee Admirals (1981–84 and 1985–86), and Muskegon Lumberjacks (1984–85); and in the Central Hockey League with the Salt Lake Golden Eagles (1979–81).

== Awards ==
The IHL twice awarded Willison the Governor's Trophy as the league's most outstanding defenceman, during the 1982–83 and 1983–84 seasons, when he was a member of the Milwaukee Admirals.
