= Monroe Civic Center =

Entertainment complex in Louisiana, United States

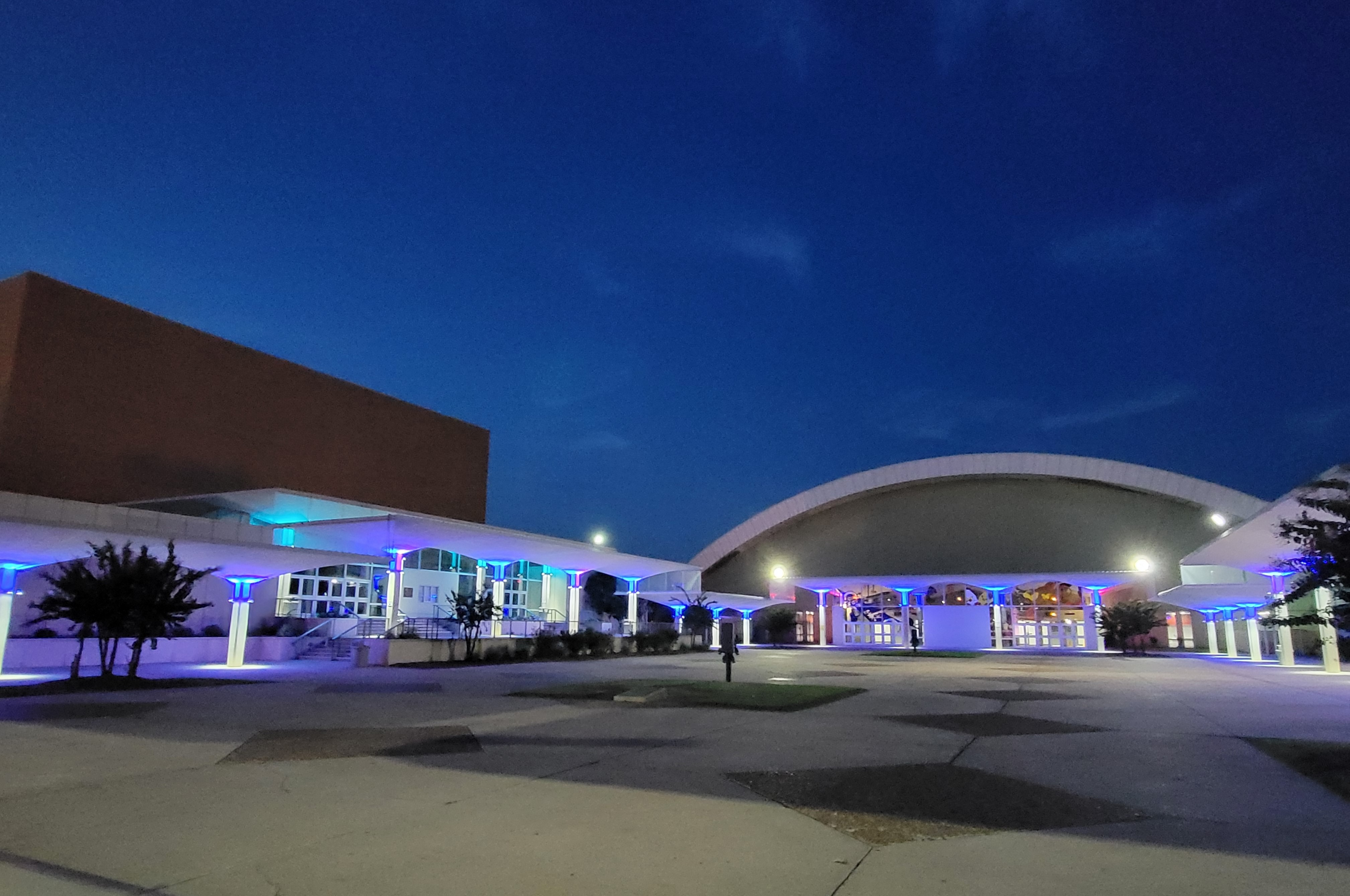
- Interactive map of Monroe Civic Center
- Location: Monroe, Louisiana
- Coordinates: 32.502754°N 92.107251°W

Construction
- Opened: 1965

Tenants
- Northeast Louisiana Indians men's basketball (NCAA) 1969–1971; Monroe Moccasins (WPHL) 1997–2001; Louisiana Bayou Beast (NIFL) 2001; Monroe Moccasins (FPHL) 2024–present Bayou State Rougarou (NA3HL) 2025–present Monroe Greenheads (TAL) 2026–present

Website
- yourciviccenter.org

The Monroe Civic Center is an entertainment complex located in Monroe, Louisiana, built in 1965.

== Entertainment facilities ==
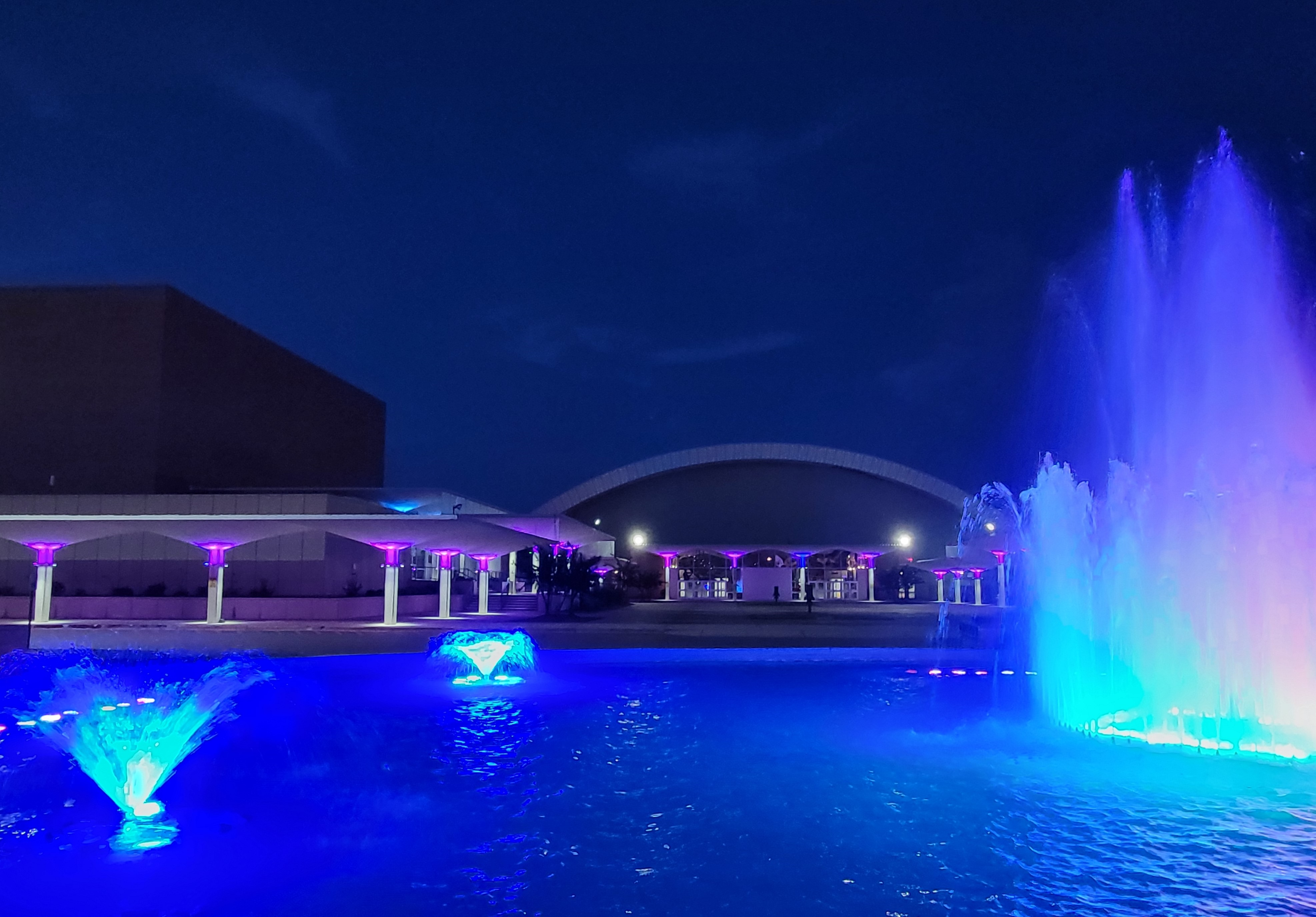
Monroe Civic Center with fountains

The Monroe Civic Center has multiple facilities:

- Civic Center Arena is the main complex of the Civic Center. The arena provides 44,000 square feet (4,100 m^{2}) of exhibit space along with 5,600 seats. The arena may have larger capacities up to 7,200 seats. The arena houses events such as banquets, circuses, music concerts, and rodeos.
- B. D. Robinson Conference Hall One of the three main buildings of the Civic Center is the 14,000 square foot Conference Hall. When using this facility, patrons have the option of dividing the Banquet Room into six sections.
- Monroe Convention Center is located on the Monroe Civic Center property, the Monroe Convention Center serves for meetings, banquets, luncheons, conventions, conferences, and trade shows.
- Jack Howard Theatre (2,200-capacity), named for W. L. "Jack" Howard, the Union Parish native who served as the mayor of Monroe from 1956 to 1972 and again from 1976 to 1978. The theater provides full-view seating for over 2,200.
- Equestrian Pavilion which features a separate warm-up arena and trailer parking equipped with electricity and other amenities.

== Notable appearances ==
The Jacksons played shows at this venue on April 5, 1971, March 3, 1973, & March 12, 1977.

Ike & Tina Turner and B.B. King performed at the Monroe Civic Center on July 8, 1971.

Elvis Presley played five sell-out shows at Monroe Civic Center, between March 1974 and May 1975.

President Donald Trump also visited the facility to rally for Eddie Rispone for Louisiana governor in 2019.

== See also ==
- List of music venues
