= Bruce Cassidy =

Canadian ice hockey coach (born 1965)

- Cassidy in 2026
- Born: May 20, 1965 (age 61) Ottawa, Ontario, Canada
- Height: 5 ft 11 in (180 cm)
- Weight: 176 lb (80 kg; 12 st 8 lb)
- Position: Defence
- Shot: Left
- Played for: Chicago Blackhawks
- Coached for: Washington Capitals; Boston Bruins; Vegas Golden Knights
- NHL draft: 18th overall, 1983; Chicago Blackhawks
- Playing career: 1984–1996
- Coaching career: 1997–present

Bruce James Cassidy (born May 20, 1965), nicknamed "Butch", is a Canadian professional ice hockey coach and former player who most recently was the head coach for the Vegas Golden Knights of the National Hockey League (NHL). He was selected in the first round, 18th overall, by the Chicago Blackhawks in the 1983 NHL entry draft. As a coach, Cassidy won the Stanley Cup with the Golden Knights in 2023.

== Playing career ==
Cassidy was a defenceman who played in the Ontario Hockey League (OHL) with the Ottawa 67's from 1982 to 1985, and he was selected by the Chicago Black Hawks of the National Hockey League (NHL) in the 1983 NHL entry draft, selected in the first round, 18th overall. Cassidy's best OHL season was in 1982–83, when he registered 25 goals and 86 assists for 111 points. He won the Memorial Cup under coach Brian Kilrea in 1984 scoring 12 points. At age 19, he made his NHL debut with the Black Hawks in March 1984. From 1984 to 1988, he had three knee surgeries, including major reconstruction of his ACL.

Between 1985 and 1990, Cassidy would spend most of his time in the Black Hawks' minor league system, playing with the Nova Scotia Oilers of the American Hockey League (AHL), the Saginaw Generals of the International Hockey League (IHL), the Saginaw Hawks of the IHL and the Indianapolis Ice, also in the IHL.

Cassidy's NHL playing career was limited due to his knee surgeries. He would also play 36 games with the Blackhawks during those years, scoring 4 goals and adding 13 assists for 17 points, along with 10 penalty minutes.

After winning the Turner Cup in the IHL, Cassidy signed with Alleghe HC in Italy and played two years with the club 1990–1992 and 1992–1993 in the Italian Ice Hockey League, appearing in 51 games and earning 117 points (35 goals and 82 assists).

After his stint in Italy, Cassidy then spent the 1993–94 season with ESV Kaufbeuren of the German Hockey League, earning 17 points (8 goals and 9 assists) in 35 games.

Cassidy then returned to the Blackhawks organization with the Indianapolis Ice from 1994 to 1997 before retiring as a player ten games into the 1996–97 season to take a head coaching job with the Jacksonville Lizard Kings of the ECHL mid-season.

== Coaching career ==
=== Jacksonville Lizard Kings (1996–1998) ===
Cassidy retired as a player with the Indianapolis Ice of the IHL to become head coach of the Jacksonville Lizard Kings of the ECHL in 1996–97. Cassidy took over the team which started the year 6–12–2, and led them to a 15–25–10 record.

The Lizard Kings greatly improved in Cassidy's second year with the team, finishing with a 35–29–6 record for 76 points.

=== Indianapolis Ice (1998–1999) ===
In 1998–99, Cassidy was promoted to head coach of the Indianapolis Ice of the IHL, the club finished the year at 33–37–12 for 78 points and qualified for the playoffs. In the first round, they played the heavily favoured Cincinnati Cyclones in a best of three series, and the Cyclones won Game 1 4–2. The Ice came back and won Game 2 4–3 in overtime, and then took the series by winning 1–0 in Game 3 in Cincinnati. In the second round, the Ice fell three games to one to the Detroit Vipers and were eliminated from the playoffs.

=== Trenton Titans (1999–2000) ===
As the Ice folded after the 1998–99 season, Cassidy took the head coaching job with the expansion Trenton Titans of the ECHL, leading them to a 37–29–4 record, good for fourth place in the Northeast Division. The Titans made short work of the Richmond Renegades in the first round, sweeping them three games to none. In the second round, they faced off against the Hampton Roads Admirals, and beat them three games to two. The Titans would then fall four games to two to the Peoria Rivermen, in the semifinals.

=== Grand Rapids Griffins (2000–2002) ===
Cassidy then moved to the Detroit Red Wings organization to become head coach of the Grand Rapids Griffins of the IHL. The club finished with the best record in the league (53–22–7 for 113 points), and they swept the Cleveland Lumberjacks in four games before falling to the Orlando Solar Bears in six games in the semifinals.

Cassidy returned to Grand Rapids for the 2001–02 season, leading them to another division title with a 42–27–11 (95 points) record, but the team lost in the first round to the Chicago Wolves in five games.

=== Washington Capitals (2002–2004) ===
The Washington Capitals of the NHL took notice of Cassidy's success in the minors and hired him to become the head coach of the club in 2002–03. The Capitals finished in second place in the Southeast with a 39–29–8–6 (92 points) record, were seeded sixth in the Eastern Conference and faced the third-seeded Tampa Bay Lightning in the opening round of the 2003 Stanley Cup playoffs. The Capitals won the first two games in Tampa Bay, but the Lightning rebounded and won four straight games to eliminate the Capitals.

Cassidy returned as head coach in 2003–04. However, just 28 games into the season with an 8–18–1-1 record, he was fired and replaced by assistant coach Glen Hanlon. The club would go on to finish with the third-worst record in the NHL under Hanlon (23–46–10–3 for 59 points), but won the draft lottery and chose Alexander Ovechkin with their first overall pick in the 2004 NHL entry draft.

=== Chicago Blackhawks (2004–2006) ===
Cassidy signed on as an assistant coach with the Chicago Blackhawks in June 2004. With the NHL lockout cancelling the 2004–05 season, Cassidy was behind the Blackhawks bench as an assistant to head coach Trent Yawney for the 2005–06 season. The Blackhawks struggled to a 26–43–13 record, earning 65 points and missed the 2006 playoffs. Cassidy's contract was not renewed. Because the team finished poorly, Cassidy's former team again secured a draft lottery pick following his departure, selecting Jonathan Toews with the third overall pick.

=== Kingston Frontenacs (2006–2008) ===
Cassidy was hired by the OHL's Kingston Frontenacs on July 12, 2006. On September 10, 2006, in a pre-season exhibition game between Kingston and the Ottawa 67's, Cassidy got the chance to coach against his former coach and mentor Brian Kilrea; the Frontenacs lost 4–3, thanks to Ottawa's three-point men Matt Lahey and Thomas Kiriakou, who each had two goals and an assist. During the regular season, Cassidy quickly rebounded in the home opener and beat his former mentor by 9–5.

During his first season as head coach, the Frontenacs would finish with a 31–30–7 record, earning them 69 points and fifth place in the Eastern Conference. The Fronts would face the Oshawa Generals in the first round of the playoffs, but would be eliminated in five games.

Cassidy returned to Kingston to begin the 2007–08 season. However, after a rough 2–9–1 start to the season, he was fired and replaced by Larry Mavety. Cassidy finished with a 33–39–8 record with the club.

=== Providence Bruins (2008–2016) ===
Cassidy joined the Providence Bruins of the AHL as an assistant coach in the 2008–09 season under head coach Rob Murray. Cassidy held this position for three years before being promoted to head coach of the team for the 2011–12 season after Murray was fired.

During his first season as head coach, the club posted a 35–34–7 record, earning 77 points and failing to qualify for the playoffs.

In his second season with Providence in 2012–13, the Bruins had the best record in the AHL, going 50–21–5 for 105 points, securing first place in the Atlantic Division. In the first round of the playoffs, the Bruins defeated the Hershey Bears in five games, setting up a second-round series against the Wilkes-Barre/Scranton Penguins. Providence took a commanding 3–0 lead in the best-of-seven series, however, the Penguins mounted a comeback, and won the final four games to upset the Bruins in seven games.

Providence made the playoffs once again in 2013–14, finishing with a 40–25–11 record, earning 91 points and seventh place in the Eastern Conference. In the first round, the Bruins upset the second seeded Springfield Falcons in five games, before again losing to the Wilkes-Barre/Scranton Penguins in seven games in the second round.

In 2014–15, Cassidy led the Bruins to their third consecutive season with 40 or more victories, as Providence earned a 41–26–9 record, getting 91 points, as the club finished in sixth place in the Eastern Conference. In the playoffs, the Bruins lost to the Hartford Wolf Pack in five games, losing the final game in overtime to be eliminated.

During the 2015–16 season, Cassidy led the team to a 41–22–13 record with them finishing in fourth place in the Eastern Conference during the regular season. The team lost the division semifinals to Wilkes-Barre/Scranton Penguins in three games.

=== Boston Bruins (2016–2022) ===
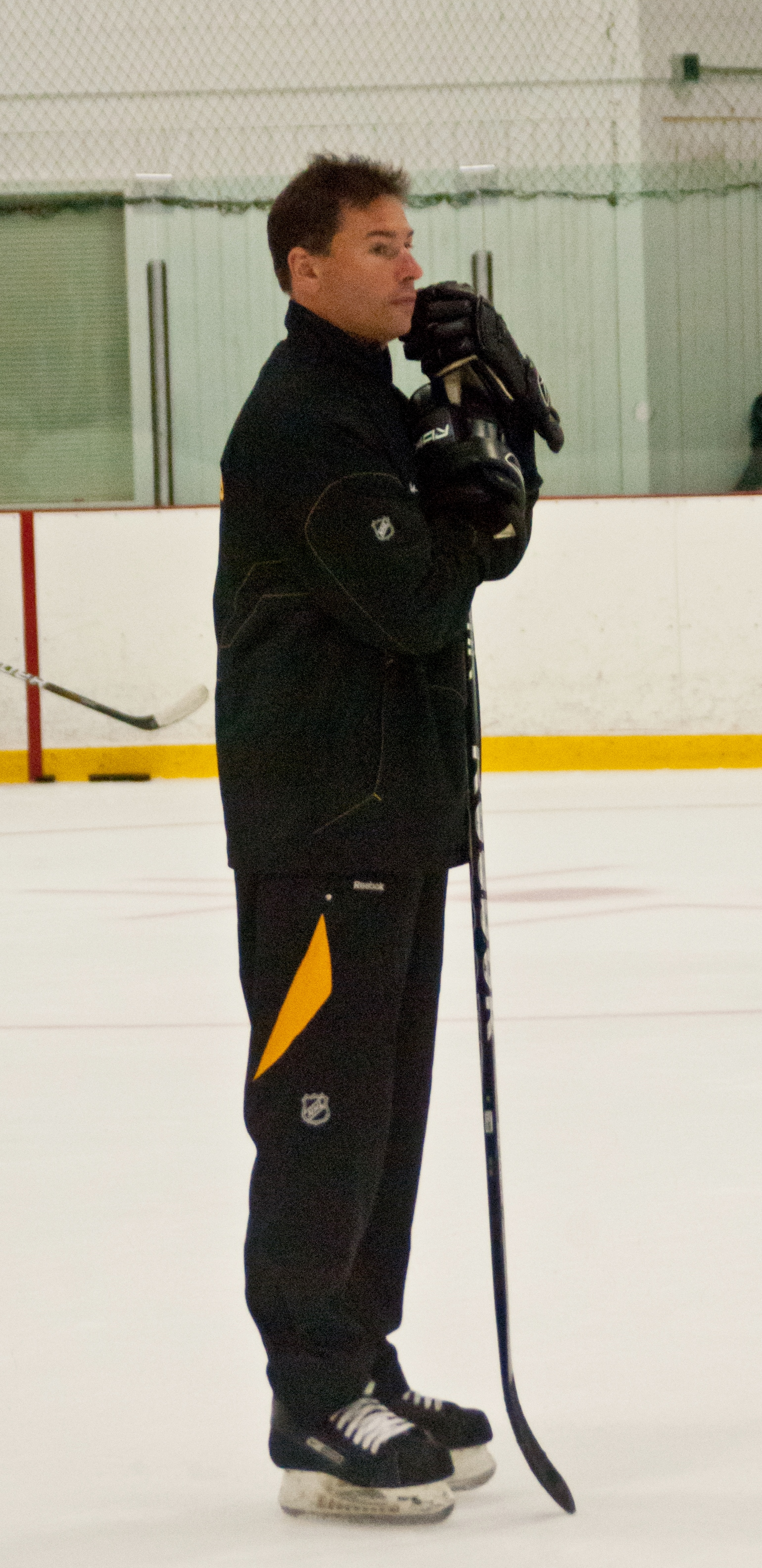
Cassidy at Bruins development camp in 2011.

On May 24, 2016, Cassidy joined the Boston Bruins as assistant coach for the 2016–17 season. On February 7, 2017, he was named interim head coach after head coach Claude Julien was fired, and on April 26, the Bruins named him the new head coach. In his first full year as Bruins head coach, he led the team to a 50–20–12 regular season record, collecting 112 points and securing the second seed in the Atlantic Division. In the playoffs, his team defeated their rivals, the Toronto Maple Leafs, 4–3 and advanced to the second round against the Tampa Bay Lightning, losing in five games.

In the 2018–19 season, Cassidy led the Bruins to an appearance in the 2019 Stanley Cup Final, where the team lost to the St. Louis Blues in seven games. On September 11, 2019, he signed a multi-year contract extension.

In the shortened 2019–20 season, Cassidy coached the Bruins to a 44–14–12 record for 100 points, capturing the Presidents' Trophy for the third time in franchise history. The Bruins went on to lose to the Tampa Bay Lightning in the second round for the second time in three seasons. In the off-season, Cassidy was named the winner of the 2019–20 Jack Adams Award, given to the best NHL coach annually.

On June 6, 2022, the Bruins relieved Cassidy of his head coaching duties after a game seven loss to the Carolina Hurricanes during the 2022 Stanley Cup playoffs.

=== Vegas Golden Knights (2022–2026) ===
On June 14, 2022, eight days after getting fired by the Bruins, Cassidy was hired by the Vegas Golden Knights as the third head coach in the franchise's history, replacing Peter DeBoer. In his first season, Cassidy won the Stanley Cup with the Golden Knights on June 13, 2023.

On March 29, 2026, with eight games remaining in the regular season, the Golden Knights fired Cassidy, after the team recorded a 3–5–2 record in Cassidy's final 10 games.

After Cassidy's firing, it was reported that the Edmonton Oilers and Los Angeles Kings made requests to Vegas about the possibility of interviewing him for a head coaching role, but they were declined by the Golden Knights, because Cassidy was under contract until the end of the 2026–27 season.

Hockey Canada hired Cassidy as advisor to general manager Danièle Sauvageau in September 2026 to help Canada’s women’s national team prepare for the World Championship in November, but he has mostly been working with new head coach Kori Cheverie.

== Personal life ==
Cassidy and his wife have two children, daughter Shannon and son Cole. He also has a son, Luke, from a previous relationship. Cassidy has been given the nickname "Butch", after Wild West outlaw Butch Cassidy, and has been referred to as such by players on many occasions.

== Career statistics ==
=== Regular season and playoffs ===
			Regular season					Playoffs
Season	Team	League	GP	G	A	Pts	PIM	GP	G	A	Pts	PIM
1981–82	Hawkesbury Hawks	CCHL	37	13	30	43	32	—	—	—	—	—
1982–83	Ottawa 67's	OHL	70	25	86	111	33	9	3	9	12	10
1983–84	Chicago Black Hawks	NHL	1	0	0	0	0	—	—	—	—	—
1983–84	Ottawa 67's	OHL	67	27	68	95	58	13	6	16	22	6
1983–84	Ottawa 67's	MC	—	—	—	—	—	9	3	9	12	10
1984–85	Ottawa 67's	OHL	28	13	27	40	15	—	—	—	—	—
1985–86	Chicago Black Hawks	NHL	1	0	0	0	0	—	—	—	—	—
1985–86	Nova Scotia Oilers	AHL	4	0	0	0	0	—	—	—	—	—
1986–87	Chicago Blackhawks	NHL	2	0	0	0	0	—	—	—	—	—
1986–87	Nova Scotia Oilers	AHL	19	2	8	10	4	2	1	1	2	0
1986–87	Saginaw Generals	IHL	10	2	13	15	6	—	—	—	—	—
1987–88	Chicago Blackhawks	NHL	21	3	10	13	6	—	—	—	—	—
1987–88	Saginaw Hawks	IHL	60	9	37	46	59	10	2	3	5	19
1988–89	Chicago Blackhawks	NHL	9	0	2	2	4	1	0	0	0	0
1988–89	Saginaw Hawks	IHL	72	16	64	80	80	6	0	2	2	6
1989–90	Chicago Blackhawks	NHL	2	1	1	2	0	—	—	—	—	—
1989–90	Indianapolis Ice	IHL	75	11	46	57	56	14	1	10	11	20
1990–91	Alleghe HC	ITA	36	23	52	75	20	10	7	8	15	2
1991–92	Alleghe HC	ITA	18	11	18	29	10	9	3	11	14	2
1991–92	Alleghe HC	AL	18	13	28	41	16	—	—	—	—	—
1992–93	Alleghe HC	ITA	16	6	22	28	4	9	6	8	14	6
1992–93	Alleghe HC	AL	32	19	40	59	12	—	—	—	—	—
1993–94	EHC Biel-Bienne	NDA	4	0	0	0	2	—	—	—	—	—
1993–94	ESV Kaufbeuren	1.GBun	33	8	9	17	12	4	1	2	3	—
1994–95	Indianapolis Ice	IHL	29	2	13	15	16	—	—	—	—	—
1995–96	Indianapolis Ice	IHL	56	5	16	21	46	5	1	0	1	4
1996–97	Indianapolis Ice	IHL	10	0	4	4	11	—	—	—	—	—
NHL totals			36	4	13	17	10	1	0	0	0	0
IHL totals			312	45	193	238	274	35	4	15	19	49
ITA totals			70	40	92	132	34	28	16	27	43	10

=== International ===
Year	Team	Comp	GP	G	A	Pts	PIM
1984	Canada	WJC	7	0	0	0	6

== Head coaching record ==
=== NHL ===
Team	Year	Regular season							Postseason			
Team	Year	G	W	L	T	OTL	Pts	Finish	W	L	W%	Result
WSH	2002–03	82	39	29	8	6	92	2nd in Southeast	2	4	.333	Lost in conference quarterfinals (TBL)
WSH	2003–04	28	8	18	1	1	(18)	(fired)	—	—	—	—
WSH total		110	47	47	9	7			2	4	.333	1 playoff appearance
BOS	2016–17	27	18	8	—	1	(37)	3rd in Atlantic	2	4	.333	Lost in first round (OTT)
BOS	2017–18	82	50	20	—	12	112	2nd in Atlantic	5	7	.417	Lost in second round (TBL)
BOS	2018–19	82	49	24	—	9	107	2nd in Atlantic	15	9	.625	Lost in Stanley Cup Final (STL)
BOS	2019–20	70	44	14	—	12	100	1st in Atlantic	5	8	.385	Lost in second round (TBL)
BOS	2020–21	56	33	16	—	7	73	3rd in East	6	5	.545	Lost in second round (NYI)
BOS	2021–22	82	51	26	—	5	107	4th in Atlantic	3	4	.429	Lost in first round (CAR)
BOS total		399	245	108	—	46			36	37	.493	6 playoff appearances
VGK	2022–23	82	51	22	—	9	111	1st in Pacific	16	6	.727	Won Stanley Cup (FLA)
VGK	2023–24	82	45	29	—	8	98	4th in Pacific	3	4	.429	Lost in first round (DAL)
VGK	2024–25	82	50	22	—	10	110	1st in Pacific	5	6	.455	Lost in second round (EDM)
VGK	2025–26	74	32	26	—	16	(80)	(fired)	—	—	—	—
VGK total		320	178	99	—	43			24	16	.600	3 playoff appearances 1 Stanley Cup
Total		829	470	254	9	96			62	57	.521	10 playoff appearances 1 Stanley Cup

=== Minor leagues ===
Team	Year	Regular season							Postseason
Team	Year	G	W	L	T	OTL	Pts	Finish	Result
JAX	1996–97	50	15	25	10	—	40	8th in South	Missed playoffs
JAX	1997–98	70	35	29	6	—	76	3rd in Southeast	Missed playoffs
IND	1998–99	82	33	37	—	12	78	3rd in Central	Lost in second round (CC)
TRE	1999–00	70	37	29	—	4	78	4th in Northeast	Lost in fourth round (PR)
GRG	2000–01	82	53	22	—	7	113	1st in East	Lost in second round (OSB)
GRG	2001–02	80	42	27	11	0	95	1st in West	Lost in first round (CHI)
KGN	2006–07	68	31	30	—	7	69	3rd in East	Lost in first round (OSH)
KGN	2007–08	12	2	9	—	1	5	5th in East	Fired
PRO	2011–12	76	35	34	—	7	77	4th in Atlantic	Missed playoffs
PRO	2012–13	76	50	21	—	5	105	1st in Atlantic	Lost in second round (WBS)
PRO	2013–14	76	40	25	—	11	91	3rd in Atlantic	Lost in second round (WBS)
PRO	2014–15	76	41	26	—	9	91	2nd in Atlantic	Lost in first round (HFD)
PRO	2015–16	76	41	22	—	13	95	2nd in Atlantic	Lost in first round (WBS)
ECHL Total		190	87	83	16	4	194		
IHL Total		164	86	59	—	19	191		
OHL Total		80	33	39	—	8	74		
AHL Total		460	249	155	11	45	554		

Sporting positions
Preceded by Ken Yaremchuk	Chicago Blackhawks first-round draft pick 1983	Succeeded by Ed Olczyk
Preceded by Guy Charron	Head coach of the Grand Rapids Griffins; 2000–2002	Succeeded by Danton Cole
Preceded by Ron Wilson	Head coach of the Washington Capitals; 2002–03	Succeeded by Glen Hanlon
Preceded by Jim Hulton	Head coach of the Kingston Frontenacs; 2006–2008	Succeeded by Larry Mavety
Preceded by Rob Murray	Head coach of the Providence Bruins; 2011–2016	Succeeded by Kevin Dean
Preceded by Claude Julien	Head coach of the Boston Bruins; 2017–2022	Succeeded by Jim Montgomery
Preceded by Peter DeBoer	Head coach of the Vegas Golden Knights; 2022–2026	Succeeded by John Tortorella
Awards and achievements
Preceded by Barry Trotz	Jack Adams Award; 2020	Succeeded by Rod Brind'Amour
