= Scott Pearson =

Canadian ice hockey player (born 1969)

- Born: December 19, 1969 (age 56) Cornwall, Ontario, Canada
- Height: 6 ft 1 in (185 cm)
- Weight: 205 lb (93 kg; 14 st 9 lb)
- Position: Left Wing
- Shot: Left
- Played for: Toronto Maple Leafs; Quebec Nordiques; Edmonton Oilers; Buffalo Sabres; New York Islanders
- NHL draft: 6th overall, 1988; Toronto Maple Leafs
- Playing career: 1988–2007

Scott Pearson (born December 19, 1969) is a Canadian former professional ice hockey player.

== Playing career ==
Scott Pearson played his junior hockey with the Kingston Canadians, Kingston Raiders and the Niagara Falls Thunder of the OHL from 1985–1989, playing in 216 games, and recording 228 points (107 goals-121 assists), while in 34 post-season games, Pearson scored 31 points (18G-13A). He was drafted by the Toronto Maple Leafs in the 1988 NHL entry draft with the Leafs 1st pick, 6th overall.

Pearson played in 9 games with Toronto in the 1988–89 season, getting an assist before being returned to the OHL. In 1989–90, he split his time with the Newmarket Saints of the AHL, earning 23 points (12G-11A) in 18 games, and with the Maple Leafs, registering 15 points (5G-10A) in 41 games. In 2 playoff games, Pearson scored 2 goals. In 1990–91, he started the season with the Leafs, going pointless in 12 games, then on November 17, 1990, Pearson was traded along with the Leafs 2nd round draft pick in both the 1991 NHL entry draft and the 1992 NHL entry draft to the Quebec Nordiques in exchange for Aaron Broten, Lucien DeBlois, and Michel Petit. Pearson then split the rest of the season playing for the Halifax Citadels of the AHL, getting 27 points (12G-15A) in 24 games, and the Nordiques, where he had 15 points (11G-4A) in 35 games.

Pearson had an injury-plagued 1991–92 season, playing in only 5 games with the Citadels, getting 3 points (2G-1A), along with 10 games in Quebec, where he also had 3 points (1G-2A). He spent the majority of the 1992–93 with the Nordiques, scoring 14 points (13G-1A) in 41 games, and 4 points (3G-1A) in 5 games with Halifax. He played for Quebec in the playoffs, getting no points in 3 games. On June 20, 1993, Quebec traded Pearson to the Edmonton Oilers for Martin Gélinas and the Oilers' 6th round pick in the 1993 NHL entry draft.

Pearson enjoyed the best season of his career in 1993–94 with the Oilers, getting 37 points (19G-18A) in 72 games. He started off the 1994–95 season with Edmonton, where he had 5 points (1G-4A) in 28 games before being dealt to the Buffalo Sabres for Ken Sutton on April 7, 1995. Pearson finished the season with the Sabres, getting 3 points (2G-1A) in 14 games before going pointless in 5 post-season games.

He split the 1995–96 season between the Sabres, where in 27 games he scored 4 points (4G-0A), and the Rochester Americans of the AHL, where in 26 games, he earned 16 points (8G-8A). Pearson then left Buffalo as a free agent, and signed with the Toronto Maple Leafs on July 24, 1996.

He missed the majority of the 1996–97 season due to abdominal surgery, as he only played in 1 game with the Leafs, getting no points, and played in 14 games with the St. John's Maple Leafs, getting 7 points (5G-2A). For the 1997–98 and 1998–99 seasons, Pearson played with the Chicago Wolves of the IHL, where he was successful. Pearson put up 51 points (34G-17A) in 78 games, then put up 18 points (12G-6A) in 21 post-season games in the 97–98 season, while the next year he had 36 points (23G-13A) in 62 games, before adding on 5 points (4G-1A) in 8 playoff games. The New York Islanders took notice of his play, and signed Pearson to a contract on August 9, 1999.

Pearson once again spent the majority of the 1999–2000 season with the Wolves, where in 77 games he put up 33 points (19G-14A), while in 16 playoff games, he chipped in with 10 points (5G-5A), and he spend some time back in the NHL, where he played in 2 games, and had an assist for the Islanders. After the season, Pearson decided to head over to Europe and play for ESC Moskitos Essen of the DEL in 2000–01, where in 51 games he put up 34 points (21G-13A).

After the 2000–01 season, Pearson retired from the game, although he made a 1-game comeback with the Gwinnett Gladiators of the ECHL during the 2006-07 season, getting no points.

== Personal ==
Pearson currently serves as the Director, Recruitment and Retention for Vizient. He is also a coach for the Atlanta Fire, a local youth hockey program. He and his wife Debbie Pearson (Delgreco) have four children between them. His son Chase was drafted 140th overall by the Detroit Red Wings in the 2015 NHL entry draft.

== Career statistics ==
| | | | Regular season | | | | | Playoffs |
| Season | Team | League | GP | G | A | Pts | PIM | GP | G | A | Pts | PIM |
|---|---|---|---|---|---|---|---|---|---|---|---|---|
| 1985–86 | Kingston Canadians | OHL | 63 | 16 | 23 | 39 | 56 | — | — | — | — | — |
| 1986–87 | Kingston Canadians | OHL | 62 | 30 | 24 | 54 | 101 | 9 | 3 | 3 | 6 | 42 |
| 1987–88 | Kingston Canadians | OHL | 46 | 26 | 32 | 58 | 117 | — | — | — | — | — |
| 1988–89 | Toronto Maple Leafs | NHL | 9 | 0 | 1 | 1 | 2 | — | — | — | — | — |
| 1988–89 | Kingston Raiders | OHL | 13 | 9 | 8 | 17 | 34 | — | — | — | — | — |
| 1988–89 | Niagara Falls Thunder | OHL | 32 | 26 | 34 | 60 | 90 | 17 | 14 | 10 | 24 | 53 |
| 1989–90 | Toronto Maple Leafs | NHL | 41 | 5 | 10 | 15 | 90 | 2 | 2 | 0 | 2 | 10 |
| 1989–90 | Newmarket Saints | AHL | 18 | 12 | 11 | 23 | 64 | — | — | — | — | — |
| 1990–91 | Toronto Maple Leafs | NHL | 12 | 0 | 0 | 0 | 20 | — | — | — | — | — |
| 1990–91 | Quebec Nordiques | NHL | 35 | 11 | 4 | 15 | 86 | — | — | — | — | — |
| 1990–91 | Halifax Citadels | AHL | 24 | 12 | 15 | 27 | 44 | — | — | — | — | — |
| 1991–92 | Quebec Nordiques | NHL | 10 | 1 | 2 | 3 | 14 | — | — | — | — | — |
| 1991–92 | Halifax Citadels | AHL | 5 | 2 | 1 | 3 | 4 | — | — | — | — | — |
| 1992–93 | Quebec Nordiques | NHL | 41 | 13 | 1 | 14 | 95 | 3 | 0 | 0 | 0 | 0 |
| 1992–93 | Halifax Citadels | AHL | 5 | 3 | 1 | 4 | 25 | — | — | — | — | — |
| 1993–94 | Edmonton Oilers | NHL | 72 | 19 | 18 | 37 | 165 | — | — | — | — | — |
| 1994–95 | Edmonton Oilers | NHL | 28 | 1 | 4 | 5 | 54 | — | — | — | — | — |
| 1994–95 | Buffalo Sabres | NHL | 14 | 2 | 1 | 3 | 20 | 5 | 0 | 0 | 0 | 4 |
| 1995–96 | Buffalo Sabres | NHL | 27 | 4 | 0 | 4 | 67 | — | — | — | — | — |
| 1995–96 | Rochester Americans | AHL | 26 | 8 | 8 | 16 | 113 | — | — | — | — | — |
| 1996–97 | Toronto Maple Leafs | NHL | 1 | 0 | 0 | 0 | 2 | — | — | — | — | — |
| 1996–97 | St. John's Maple Leafs | AHL | 14 | 5 | 2 | 7 | 26 | 9 | 5 | 2 | 7 | 14 |
| 1997–98 | Chicago Wolves | IHL | 78 | 34 | 17 | 51 | 225 | 22 | 12 | 6 | 18 | 50 |
| 1998–99 | Chicago Wolves | IHL | 62 | 23 | 13 | 36 | 154 | 8 | 4 | 1 | 5 | 50 |
| 1999–2000 | New York Islanders | NHL | 2 | 0 | 1 | 1 | 0 | — | — | — | — | — |
| 1999–2000 | Chicago Wolves | IHL | 77 | 19 | 14 | 33 | 124 | 16 | 5 | 5 | 10 | 28 |
| 2000–01 | Moskitos Essen | DEL | 51 | 21 | 13 | 34 | 225 | — | — | — | — | — |
| 2006–07 | Gwinnett Gladiators | ECHL | 1 | 0 | 0 | 0 | 0 | — | — | — | — | — |
| NHL totals | | | 292 | 56 | 42 | 98 | 615 | 10 | 2 | 0 | 2 | 14 |
| AHL totals | | | 92 | 42 | 38 | 80 | 276 | 9 | 5 | 2 | 7 | 14 |
| IHL totals | | | 217 | 76 | 44 | 120 | 503 | 46 | 21 | 12 | 33 | 128 |

| Preceded by Luke Richardson | Toronto Maple Leafs first-round draft pick 1988 | Succeeded by Scott Thornton |
