= Brian Curran =

- Born: November 5, 1963 (age 62) Toronto, Ontario, Canada
- Height: 6 ft 5 in (196 cm)
- Weight: 215 lb (98 kg; 15 st 5 lb)
- Position: Defence
- Shot: Left
- Played for: Boston Bruins; New York Islanders; Toronto Maple Leafs; Buffalo Sabres; Washington Capitals
- NHL draft: 22nd overall, 1982; Boston Bruins
- Playing career: 1983–1998

Brian Phillip Curran (born November 5, 1963) is a Canadian ice hockey coach, executive and former player. Curran was born in Toronto, Ontario, but grew up in Veteran, Alberta.

== Career ==
Selected by the Boston Bruins in the 1982 NHL entry draft, he played as a defenceman for the Bruins, New York Islanders, Toronto Maple Leafs, Buffalo Sabres, and Washington Capitals in the National Hockey League (NHL).

== Coaching career ==
Following his playing career, Curran got into coaching and was the head coach of Jacksonville of the ECHL in 1998-99 and the Monroe Moccasins of the WPHL in 1999-2000. He was the general manager and head coach of the Quad City Mallards until he resigned on April 26, 2007. Curran was the head coach of the Kalamazoo Wings hockey team in Kalamazoo, Michigan, during the 2007–08 season until he was released on April 8, 2008. On July 9, 2008, he was hired as head coach and general manager of the Brooks Bandits of the Alberta Junior Hockey League. On October 16, 2009, Curran was released from his duties with the Bandits. Curran was introduced as the head coach and general manager of the Lloydminster Bobcats of the Alberta Junior Hockey League on November 25, 2009, a position he held until he resigned on March 8, 2012. On February 22, 2012, Curran was named the 2011-12 AJHL coach of the year. On March 15, 2012, Curran signed a five-year contract to coach and manage the Drumheller Dragons of the AJHL.

== Career statistics ==
			Regular season					Playoffs
Season	Team	League	GP	G	A	Pts	PIM	GP	G	A	Pts	PIM
1980–81	Portland Winter Hawks	WHL	59	2	28	30	275	7	0	1	1	13
1981–82	Portland Winter Hawks	WHL	51	2	16	18	132	14	1	7	8	63
1982–83	Portland Winter Hawks	WHL	56	1	30	31	187	14	1	3	4	57
1983–84	Hershey Bears	AHL	23	0	2	2	94	—	—	—	—	—
1983–84	Boston Bruins	NHL	16	1	1	2	57	—	—	—	—	—
1984–85	Hershey Bears	AHL	4	0	0	0	19	—	—	—	—	—
1984–85	Boston Bruins	NHL	56	0	1	1	158	—	—	—	—	—
1985–86	Boston Bruins	NHL	43	2	5	7	192	2	0	0	0	4
1986–87	New York Islanders	NHL	68	0	10	10	356	8	0	0	0	51
1987–88	Springfield Indians	AHL	8	1	0	1	43	—	—	—	—	—
1987–88	New York Islanders	NHL	22	0	1	1	68	—	—	—	—	—
1987–88	Toronto Maple Leafs	NHL	7	0	1	1	19	6	0	0	0	41
1988–89	Toronto Maple Leafs	NHL	47	1	4	5	185	—	—	—	—	—
1989–90	Toronto Maple Leafs	NHL	72	2	9	11	301	5	0	1	1	19
1990–91	Newmarket Saints	AHL	6	0	1	1	32	—	—	—	—	—
1990–91	Rochester Americans	AHL	10	0	0	0	36	—	—	—	—	—
1990–91	Toronto Maple Leafs	NHL	4	0	0	0	7	—	—	—	—	—
1990–91	Buffalo Sabres	NHL	17	0	1	1	43	—	—	—	—	—
1991–92	Rochester Americans	AHL	36	0	3	3	122	—	—	—	—	—
1991–92	Buffalo Sabres	NHL	3	0	0	0	14	—	—	—	—	—
1992–93	Cape Breton Oilers	AHL	61	2	24	26	223	12	0	3	3	12
1993–94	Portland Pirates	AHL	46	1	6	7	247	15	0	1	1	59
1993–94	Washington Capitals	NHL	26	1	0	1	61	—	—	—	—	—
1994–95	Portland Pirates	AHL	59	2	10	12	328	7	0	0	0	24
1995–96	Portland Pirates	AHL	34	1	2	3	122	—	—	—	—	—
1995–96	Michigan K-Wings	IHL	18	0	5	5	55	10	0	4	4	38
1996–97	Philadelphia Phantoms	AHL	3	0	0	0	8	—	—	—	—	—
1997–98	Monroe Moccasins	WPHL	68	7	17	24	239	—	—	—	—	—
1997–98	Utah Grizzlies	IHL	1	0	0	0	2	—	—	—	—	—
1997–98	Las Vegas Thunder	IHL	9	0	2	2	49	2	0	0	0	20
NHL totals			381	7	33	40	1461	24	0	1	1	122
AHL totals			396	7	48	55	1,274	34	0	4	4	95
WPHL totals			68	7	17	24	239	0	0	0	0	0
IHL totals			28	0	7	7	106	12	0	4	4	58
WHL totals			166	5	74	79	594	35	2	11	13	133
