= Governor's Trophy =

International Hockey League player award (1965-2001)

The Governor's Trophy was awarded annually by the International Hockey League to the most outstanding defenseman as judged by league coaches. It was first awarded in 1965, and renamed the Larry D. Gordon Trophy in 1999. It was awarded 38 times, to 33 different players; Jim Burton was a three-time recipient,

== Winners ==
Governor's Trophy
Season	Player	Team
1964-65	Lionel Repka	Fort Wayne Komets
1965-66	Bob Lemieux	Muskegon Mohawks
1966-67	Larry Mavety	Port Huron Flags
1967-68	Carl Brewer	Muskegon Mohawks
1968-69	Maurice Benoît & Alain Beaule	Dayton Gems
1969-70	John Gravel	Toledo Blades
1970-71	Bob LePage	Des Moines Oak Leafs
1971-72	Rick Pagnutti	Fort Wayne Komets
1972-73	Bob McCammon	Port Huron Wings
1973-74	Dave Simpson (Note: Dave Simpson, while drafted in the 3rd round of the 1968 NHL Amateur Draft, and earning the IHL award as Best Defenceman in 1973–74, only played professional hockey for seven seasons, split across six teams in three different minor leagues: the CHL's Amarillo Wranglers (107 games over two seasons); the AHL's Baltimore Clippers and Boston Braves (totaling 6 games over two seasons); and the IHL's Des Moines Oak Leafs, Port Huron Flags and Dayton Gems (totaling 325 games over five seasons).)	Dayton Gems
1974-75	Murray Flegel	Muskegon Mohawks
1975-76	Murray Flegel	Muskegon Mohawks
1976-77	Tom Mellor	Toledo Goaldiggers
1977-78	Michel Lachance	Milwaukee Admirals
1978-79	Guido Tenesi	Grand Rapids Owls
1979-80	John Gibson	Saginaw Gears
1980-81	Larry Goodenough	Saginaw Gears
1981-82	Don Waddell	Saginaw Gears
1982-83	Jim Burton	Fort Wayne Komets
1982-83	Kevin Willison	Milwaukee Admirals
1983-84	Kevin Willison	Milwaukee Admirals
1984-85	Lee Norwood	Peoria Rivermen
1985-86	Jim Burton	Fort Wayne Komets
1986-87	Jim Burton	Fort Wayne Komets
1987-88	Phil Bourque	Muskegon Lumberjacks
1988-89	Randy Boyd	Milwaukee Admirals
1989-90	Brian Glynn	Salt Lake Golden Eagles
1990-91	Brian McKee	Fort Wayne Komets
1991-92	Jean-Marc Richard	Fort Wayne Komets
1992-93	Bill Houlder	San Diego Gulls
1993-94	Darren Veitch	Peoria Rivermen
1994-95	Todd Richards	Las Vegas Thunder
1995-96	Greg Hawgood	Las Vegas Thunder
1996-97	Brad Werenka	Indianapolis Ice
1997-98	Dan Lambert	Long Beach Ice Dogs
Larry D. Gordon Trophy
Season	Player	Team
1998-99	Greg Hawgood	Houston Aeros
1999-00	Brett Hauer	Manitoba Moose
2000-01	Brett Hauer	Manitoba Moose
