= Kingston Raiders =

Canadian junior ice hockey team (1988–89)

- City: Kingston, Ontario
- League: Ontario Hockey League
- Conference: Leyden
- Division: East
- Operated: 1988–89
- Home arena: Kingston Memorial Centre
- Colours: Black, white and silver
- Head coach: Larry Mavety

Franchise history
- 1972–1973: Kingston Frontenacs Jr.A.
- 1973–1988: Kingston Canadians
- 1988–1989: Kingston Raiders
- 1989–present: Kingston Frontenacs

The Kingston Raiders were a junior ice hockey team based in Kingston, Ontario, playing in the Ontario Hockey League for the 1988–89 season. The team played out of the Kingston Memorial Centre.

== History ==
When the Kingston Canadians were sold in 1988, the club's new owner, Lou Kazowski, sought suggestions to rebrand the team for a fresh start. The name Kingston Raiders was chosen, with Larry Mavety named as the coach and the general manager, who previously coached their geographic rivals, the Belleville Bulls. Mavety signed a four-year contract, was also named vice-president of hockey operations, and was previously a teammate of Kazowski while playing defence on the Port Huron Flags in the International Hockey League from 1964 to 1966.

The Raiders' colours were black, silver and white. Their logo featured a player holding a stick and wearing an eye patch, with a letter R in black in the background inside a silver and white circle.

The Raiders played home games at the Kingston Memorial Centre. Attempting to gain concessions from the city in an arena lease, team owner Lou Kazowski threatened to relocate the team to Barrie, Ontario. Despite receiving a new arena agreement in December 1988, Kazowski threatened to relocate the team to Owen Sound at the end of the season, leaving him unpopular with the team's supporters who felt betrayed. In their only season of existence, the Raiders finished seventh in the Leyden division and did not qualify for the playoffs.

The Ontario Hockey League intervened to keep the team in Kingston, stating that it was a good community for hockey, and that proposed relocations to Owen Sound or Port Huron, Michigan, would create imbalanced divisions. Seeking approval to relocate to Owen Sound, the league's board of governors voted 14–1 against the move.

Kazowski received an offer from Compuware based in Detroit, to buy the Raiders and keep the team in Kingston, but instead sold the Raiders to Bob Attersley, the mayor of Whitby, Ontario, and a former Eastern Professional Hockey League (EPHL) player in Kingston who committed to keeping the team in the city and bring local businessmen onboard. Owen Sound instead received the relocated Guelph Platers team.

The team was renamed the Kingston Frontenacs after the EPHL team for Attersley had played, and returned to the black and gold colour scheme. The operating partnership of the Frontenacs was expanded to include Wren Blair and other local businessmen, and the team saw its season ticket holder base double from 500 to 1,000.

=== 1988–89 season results ===
1988–89 season results:

Season	Games	Won	Lost	Tied	Points	Pct %	Goals for	Goals against	Standing	Playoffs
1988–89	66	25	36	5	55	0.417	278	313	7th in Leyden	did not qualify

== Players ==
The Kingston Raiders had the first overall pick in the draft that year and chose Drake Berehowsky, who received the Jack Ferguson Award as the top draft pick.

Jeff Wilson won the F. W. "Dinty" Moore Trophy, for the best goals against average for a rookie goaltender in the 1988–89 season.

List of National Hockey League alumni:

- Drake Berehowsky
- Tony Cimellaro
- Sean Gauthier
- Mark Major
- Scott Pearson
- Jason Simon
