= 1996–97 WPHL season =

The 1996–97 Western Professional Hockey League season was the inaugural season of the Western Professional Hockey League, a North American minor pro league. Six teams participated in the regular season, the President's Cup champions were the El Paso Buzzards. And the Governor's Cup champions were the New Mexico Scorpions

== Regular season ==
	GP	W	L	OTL	GF	GA	Pts
New Mexico Scorpions	64	42	20	2	323	258	86
Austin Ice Bats	64	35	22	7	271	249	77
El Paso Buzzards	64	33	23	8	284	272	74
Central Texas Stampede	64	35	27	2	243	229	72
Waco Wizards	64	30	30	4	220	249	64
Amarillo Rattlers	64	17	39	8	239	323	42

== President's Cup-Playoffs ==
President's Cup-Semifinals
1	New Mexico Scorpions	2
4	Central Texas Stampede	4
2	Austin Ice Bats	2
3	El Paso Buzzards	4

President's Cup-Final
3	El Paso Buzzards	4
4	Central Texas Stampede	1
