= Waco Wizards =

- City: Waco, Texas
- League: Western Professional Hockey League
- Operated: 1996–2000
- Home arena: Heart of Texas Coliseum

The Waco Wizards were an American ice hockey team in Waco, Texas. They played in the Western Professional Hockey League from 1996 to 2000. They played their home games in the Heart of Texas Coliseum.

== Season-by-season record ==
Season	GP	W	L	OTL	Pts	GF	GA	Place	Playoffs
1996–97	64	30	30	4	64	220	249	5th, WPHL	Did not qualify
1997–98	69	18	48	3	39	203	319	7th, East Div.	Did not qualify
1998–99	69	40	22	7	87	275	232	1st, Central Div.	Lost Quarterfinals, 1–3 vs. San Angelo Outlaws
1999–2000	27	11	14	2	24	86	107	5th, Central Div.	Folded during the season

== Records ==
- Games: Tim Green, 145
- Goals: Jamie Dunn, 47
- Assists: Jamie Hearn, 70
- Points: Tony Cimellaro, 110
- PIM: Chad Muachalchuk and Brad Domonsky, 314
