= Central Texas Stampede =

- Founded: 1996
- Last season: 2001
- League: Western Professional Hockey League
- Team history: Central Texas Stampede (1996–2001)
- Based in: Belton, Texas
- Arena: Bell County Expo Center
- Colors: Red, Gold, Black, & White
- Championships: 0
- Division titles: 1 (1999–00)

The Central Texas Stampede was a professional ice hockey team based in Belton, Texas. It was the first professional sports franchise established in the city.

The logo for the former minor league hockey team, the Central Texas Stampede, was inspired by the Texas Longhorns and the region's cattle-driven identity. It features an aggressive, stylized bull that references the mascot of the University of Texas at Austin, which is well-known throughout the state.

Founded in 1996, the Stampede was one of six charter members of the newly created Western Professional Hockey League (WPHL), a mid-level minor professional league that sought to expand hockey into southern U.S. markets. The team played its home games at the Bell County Expo Center (now Cadence Bank Center), a 6,500-seat multipurpose arena.

== History ==
The Stampede's inaugural game took place on October 15, 1996, when they defeated the Waco Wizards 5–4 in the first-ever WPHL contest. Under head coach Bob Bourne, a former NHL player, the team posted a 35–27–2 record in the 1996–97 season, earning 72 points and advancing to the league finals, where they lost to the El Paso Buzzards 4-1.

In the following seasons, the Stampede experienced varying levels of success. Coached by former NHL defenseman Lee Norwood in 1997–98, they improved to a 40–23–6 record with 86 points but were eliminated in the first round of the playoffs. The 1998–99 campaign, led by coach Glen Williamson, saw a 33–24–12 finish for 78 points, again ending in a first-round playoff exit. The team's peak came in 1999–2000 under head coach Todd Lalonde, who guided them to a league-best 50–17–3 record and 103 points, securing the Central Division title. Despite this strong regular season, the Stampede were ousted in the third round of the playoffs.

Financial difficulties plagued the franchise throughout its existence, exacerbated by inconsistent attendance figures in a market with a limited population base and competition from other regional entertainment options. In their final partial season of 2000–01, still under Lalonde, the team managed only a 14–19–5 record over 38 games before folding on January 6, 2001, midway through the campaign. The WPHL itself merged with the Central Hockey League (CHL) at the end of that season, but the Stampede did not continue in the new league.

Following the team's dissolution, the Belton market saw no professional ice hockey for over two decades. However, in 2025, efforts to revive the Stampede gained traction. Social media accounts and an official website emerged, teasing a potential return of minor league hockey to Central Texas. While excitement built among fans, representatives from the Cadence Bank Center indicated no immediate plans for arena usage, and the revival remained in early planning stages, focused on roster building, merchandise development, and community engagement. As of late 2025, no specific league affiliation or start date had been confirmed, leaving the project's future uncertain but promising.

=== Revival ===
In July 2025, rumors circulated on social media and local outlets about a potential revival of the Central Texas Stampede. Cadence Bank Center officials denied these claims on July 1, 2025, stating there were no confirmed plans, commitments, or contracts in place. Local media verified that while fan nostalgia persists, no return was imminent as of that date.
