= Western Professional Hockey League =

Professional American ice hockey league from 1996 to 2001

- Sport: Ice hockey
- Founded: 1996
- Folded: 2001
- Replaced by: Central Hockey League (partial)
- No. of teams: 18
- Country: United States
- Last champion: Bossier-Shreveport Mudbugs
- Most titles: Bossier-Shreveport Mudbugs (3)

The Western Professional Hockey League (abbreviated WPHL) was a minor professional ice hockey league.

The WPHL operated from 1996 to 2001 with teams based in the southern United States, primarily Texas and Louisiana. The league started with six teams in the 1996–97 season and grew to 18 teams in 1999–00. After the 2000–01 season, the WPHL merged with the Central Hockey League. Former WPHL teams continued to play in the CHL until the 2012–13 season.

== Teams in alphabetical order ==
Location of historical Texas- and New Mexico-based WPHL teams, 1996–2001. Note teams were not necessarily contemporaneous with each other. For teams based east of Texas, see map below.
Location of historical WPHL teams based east of Texas, 1996–2001. Not shown: Arkansas GlacierCats (Little Rock, AR), Tupelo T-Rex (Tupelo, MS).
- Abilene Aviators (Abilene, Texas) 1998–2000; folded during the 1999–2000 season
- Alexandria Warthogs (Alexandria, Louisiana) 1998–2000
- Amarillo Rattlers (Amarillo, Texas) 1996–2001; continued in CHL until 2010 as Amarillo Gorillas
- Arkansas GlacierCats (Little Rock, Arkansas) 1998–2000
- Austin Ice Bats (Austin, Texas) 1996–2001; continued in CHL until 2008
- Bossier-Shreveport Mudbugs (Bossier City, Louisiana) 2000–01; continued in CHL until 2011
- Central Texas Stampede (Belton, Texas) 1996–2001; folded during the 2000–01 season
- Corpus Christi IceRays (Corpus Christi, Texas) 1998–2001; continued in CHL until 2010 when the owners added a junior team in the North American Hockey League
- El Paso Buzzards (El Paso, Texas) 1996–2001; continued in CHL until 2003
- Fort Worth Brahmas (Fort Worth, Texas) 1997–2001; continued in CHL until 2013 when the owners added a junior team in the North American Hockey League
- Lake Charles Ice Pirates (Lake Charles, Louisiana) 1997–2001; folded during the 2001 CHL merger
- Lubbock Cotton Kings (Lubbock, Texas) 1999–2001; continued in CHL until 2007
- Monroe Moccasins (Monroe, Louisiana) 1997–2001; folded during the 2001 CHL merger
- New Mexico Scorpions (Rio Rancho, New Mexico) 1996–2001; continued in CHL until 2009
- Odessa Jackalopes (Odessa, Texas) 1997–2001; continued in CHL until 2011 when the owners added a junior team in the North American Hockey League
- San Angelo Outlaws (San Angelo, Texas) 1996–2001; continued in CHL until 2005 as San Angelo Saints
- Shreveport Mudbugs (Shreveport, Louisiana) 1997–2000
- Tupelo T-Rex (Tupelo, Mississippi) 1998–2001; chose not to join the CHL during the 2001 merger and launched a junior team instead in the America West Hockey League
- Waco Wizards (Waco, Texas) 1996–2000; folded during the 1999–2000 season

== Planned teams in alphabetical order ==
Tucson Scorch (Tucson, Arizona) 1999; never played a game due to the owner of the team failing to post a financial guarantee

== Champions ==
=== President's Cup winners ===
Playoff champions:

- 1997 – El Paso Buzzards
- 1998 – El Paso Buzzards
- 1999 – Shreveport Mudbugs
- 2000 – Shreveport Mudbugs
- 2001 – Bossier-Shreveport Mudbugs

=== Governor's Cup ===
Regular season champions:

- 1996–97 – New Mexico Scorpions
- 1997–98 – Fort Worth Brahmas
- 1998–99 – Shreveport Mudbugs
- 1999–00 – Central Texas Stampede
- 2000–01 – Tupelo T-Rex

== Individual league awards ==
=== 1996–97 ===
- Coach of the year - Todd Brost, El Paso
- Most valuable player - Chris Brooks, Amarillo
- Scoring champion - Chris Brooks, Amarillo
- Most outstanding goaltender - Daniel Berthiaume, Central Texas
- Most outstanding defenseman - Jody Praznik, New Mexico
- Playoff most valuable player - Chris MacKenzie, El Paso
- All-star game most valuable player - Doug Smith, Central Texas

=== 1997–98 ===
- Coach of the year - Bill McDonald, Fort Worth Brahmas
- Most valuable player - Jamie Thompson, El Paso
- Man of the year - Jamie Thompson, El Paso
- Scoring champion - Carl Boudreau, San Angelo
- Rookie of the year - Sami Laine, Odessa
- Most outstanding goaltender - Kevin St. Pierre, Shreveport
- Most outstanding defenseman - Eric Ricard, New Mexico
- Playoff most valuable player - Billy Trew, El Paso
- All-star game most valuable player - Sylvain Naud, New Mexico

=== 1998–99 ===
- Coach of the year - Todd Lalonde, Waco
- Most valuable player - Chris Robertson, Corpus Christi
- Man of the year - Graeme Townshend, Lake Charles
- Scoring champion - Carl Boudreau, San Angelo
- Rookie of the year - Kory Cooper, Waco
- Most outstanding goaltender - Kory Cooper, Waco
- Most outstanding defenseman - Eric Brule, Abilene
- Playoff most valuable player - John Vecchiarelli, Shreveport
- All-star game most valuable player - Billy Trew, El Paso

=== 1999–00 ===
- Coach of the year - Brian Curran, Monroe
- Most valuable player - Ron Newhook, Central Texas
- Man of the year - Brad Haelzle, Amarillo and Scott Muscutt, Shreveport
- Scoring champion - Geoff Bumstead, Corpus Christi
- Rookie of the year - Dan Price, Austin
- Most outstanding goaltender - Matt Barnes, Central Texas
- Most outstanding defenseman - Arturs Kupaks, Lubbock
- Playoff most valuable player - Hugo Hamelin, Shreveport
- All-star game most valuable player - Dorian Anneck, Monroe

=== 2000–01 ===
- Coach of the year -Don McKee, Odessa
- Most valuable player - Jason Firth, Tupelo
- Man of the year - Travis Van Tighem, New Mexico
- Scoring champion - Jason Firth, Tupelo
- Rookie of the year - Ken Carroll, Bossier-Shreveport
- Most outstanding goaltender - Ken Carroll, Bossier-Shreveport
- Most outstanding defenseman - Mark DeSantis, New Mexico
- Playoff most valuable player - Jason Campbell, Bossier-Shreveport
- All-star game most valuable player - Kyle Reeves, Lubbock
- Rick Kozuback Award - Trent Eigner, El Paso

== See also ==
- List of developmental and minor sports leagues
- List of ice hockey leagues
- Minor league
- Sports league attendances
