= 2006–07 Atlanta Thrashers season =

National Hockey League team season

2006–07 Atlanta Thrashers
- Southeast Division champions
- Division: 1st Southeast
- Conference: 3rd Eastern
- 2006–07 record: 43–28–11
- Home record: 23–12–6
- Road record: 20–16–5
- Goals for: 246
- Goals against: 245

Team information
- General manager: Don Waddell
- Coach: Bob Hartley
- Captain: Scott Mellanby
- Alternate captains: Niclas Havelid; Bobby Holik; Marian Hossa; Vyacheslav Kozlov
- Arena: Philips Arena
- Average attendance: 16,229
- Minor league affiliates: Chicago Wolves; Augusta Lynx

Team leaders
- Goals: Marian Hossa (43)
- Assists: Marian Hossa (57)
- Points: Marian Hossa (100)
- Penalty minutes: Bobby Holik (86)
- Plus/minus: Marian Hossa (+18)
- Wins: Kari Lehtonen (34)
- Goals against average: Kari Lehtonen (2.79)

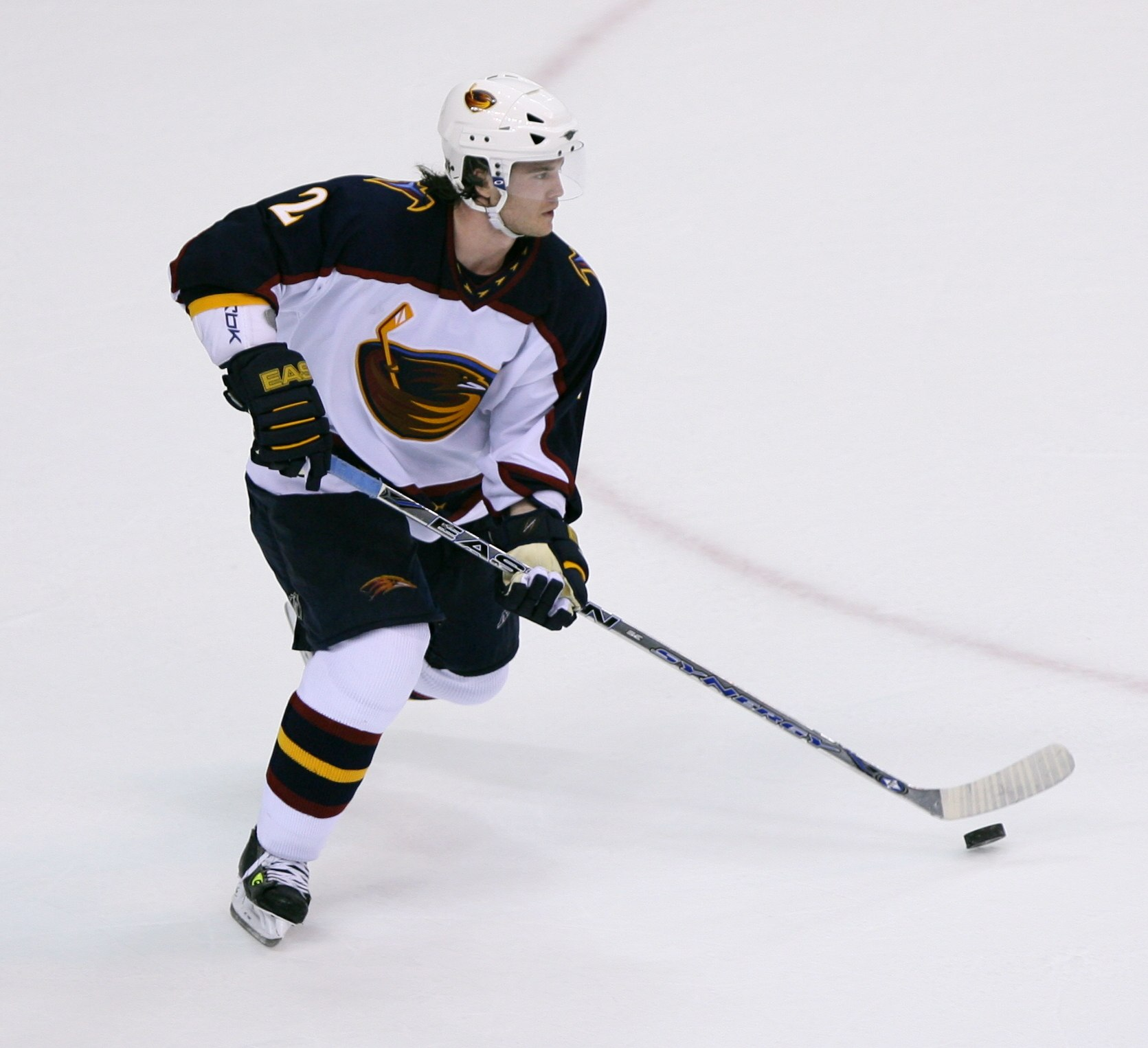

The 2006–07 Atlanta Thrashers season was the 24th season of play for the National Hockey League franchise that was established on June 22, 1979, and 32nd season for the organization overall.

The season began with the highest expectations in franchise history, even with the off-season loss of their second-leading scorer, Marc Savard, to the Boston Bruins. Veteran centers Steve Rucchin, Niko Kapanen and Jon Sim were acquired in hopes help fill the loss of Savard. With NHL superstars Marian Hossa and Ilya Kovalchuk and a healthy goaltender, Kari Lehtonen, the Thrashers clinched the first playoff berth in franchise history following the Toronto Maple Leafs' 7–2 loss to the New York Rangers on April 1. They were eliminated from the playoffs on April 18, being swept by the Rangers in four straight games in the quarterfinals.

== Regular season ==
=== Season standings ===
Southeast Division
No.	CR		GP	W	L	OTL	GF	GA	Pts
1	3	**Atlanta Thrashers**	82	43	28	11	246	245	97
2	7	**Tampa Bay Lightning**	82	44	33	5	253	261	93
3	11	Carolina Hurricanes	82	40	34	8	241	253	88
4	12	Florida Panthers	82	35	31	16	247	257	86
5	14	Washington Capitals	82	28	40	14	235	286	70

Note: No. = Division rank, CR = Conference rank, W = Wins, L = Losses, T = Ties, GF = Goals For, GA = Goals Against, Pts = Points
Teams that qualified for the playoffs are highlighted in bold.

Eastern Conference
R		Div	GP	W	L	OTL	GF	GA	Pts
**1**	**P -** Buffalo Sabres	**NE**	**82**	**53**	**22**	**7**	**308**	**242**	113
**2**	**Y -** New Jersey Devils	**AT**	**82**	**49**	**24**	**9**	**216**	**201**	107
**3**	**Y -** Atlanta Thrashers	**SE**	**82**	**43**	**28**	**11**	**246**	**245**	97
**4**	**X -** Ottawa Senators	**NE**	**82**	**48**	**25**	**9**	**288**	**222**	105
**5**	**X -** Pittsburgh Penguins	**AT**	**82**	**47**	**24**	**11**	**277**	**246**	105
**6**	**X -** New York Rangers	**AT**	**82**	**42**	**30**	**10**	**242**	**216**	94
**7**	**X -** Tampa Bay Lightning	**SE**	**82**	**44**	**33**	**5**	**253**	**261**	93
**8**	**X -** New York Islanders	**AT**	**82**	**40**	**30**	**12**	**248**	**240**	92
8.5
9	Toronto Maple Leafs	NE	82	40	31	11	258	269	91
10	Montreal Canadiens	NE	82	42	34	6	245	256	90
11	Carolina Hurricanes	SE	82	40	34	8	241	253	88
12	Florida Panthers	SE	82	35	31	16	247	257	86
13	Boston Bruins	NE	82	35	41	6	219	289	76
14	Washington Capitals	SE	82	28	40	14	235	286	70
15	Philadelphia Flyers	AT	82	22	48	12	214	303	56

Divisions: AT – Atlantic, NE – Northeast, SE – Southeast

P – Clinched Presidents Trophy; Y – Clinched division; X – Clinched playoff spot

== Playoffs ==
The Thrashers qualified for the post-season for the first time in franchise history, while also capturing their first Southeast Division championship. Atlanta headed into the playoffs as the 3rd seed in the Eastern Conference. The Thrashers had a highly disappointing playoff series against the New York Rangers, as they were upset in a four-game sweep with losses of 4–3, 2–1, 7–0, and 4–2.

== Schedule and results ==
=== Regular season ===
2006–07 regular season
October: 8–2–3 (home: 4–1–1; road: 4–1–2)

Game	Date	Visitor	Score	Home	OT	Decision	Attendance	Record	Points	Recap
1	October 5	Tampa Bay	3 – 2	Atlanta	SO	Lehtonen	17,269	0–0–1	1	OTL
2	October 7	Florida	0 – 6	Atlanta		Lehtonen	14,239	1–0–1	3	W
3	October 9	Atlanta	1 – 0	Tampa Bay		Lehtonen	19,817	2–0–1	5	W
4	October 11	Boston	1 – 4	Atlanta		Lehtonen	12,579	3–0–1	7	W
5	October 13	Carolina	4 – 3	Atlanta		Lehtonen	13,106	3–1–1	7	L
6	October 14	Atlanta	4 – 3	Washington	OT	Lehtonen	11,995	4–1–1	9	W
7	October 19	Washington	3 – 4	Atlanta	SO	Lehtonen	12,719	5–1–1	11	W
8	October 21	Florida	2 – 4	Atlanta		Lehtonen	16,178	6–1–1	13	W
9	October 23	Atlanta	6 – 3	Florida		Lehtonen	13,102	7–1–1	15	W
10	October 25	Atlanta	4 – 5	Carolina	OT	Lehtonen	15,008	7–1–2	16	OTL
11	October 26	Atlanta	2 – 3	Philadelphia	SO	Lehtonen	19,228	7–1–3	17	OTL
12	October 28	Atlanta	5 – 4	Buffalo	SO	Lehtonen	18,690	8–1–3	19	W
13	October 30	Atlanta	2 – 4	Toronto		Lehtonen	19,285	8–2–3	19	L

November: 8–5–1 (home: 4–3–0; road: 4–2–1)

Game	Date	Visitor	Score	Home	OT	Decision	Attendance	Record	Points	Recap
14	November 1	Carolina	5 – 2	Atlanta		Lehtonen	14,277	8–3–3	19	L
15	November 3	Atlanta	4 – 3	Washington		Hedberg	12,834	9–3–3	21	W
16	November 4	Atlanta	4 – 1	NY Islanders		Hedberg	12,394	10–3–3	23	W
17	November 6	Boston	3 – 5	Atlanta		Hedberg	14,084	11–3–3	25	W
18	November 8	Ottawa	4 – 5	Atlanta		Lehtonen	16,253	12–3–3	27	W
19	November 10	NY Rangers	5 – 2	Atlanta		Lehtonen	18,545	12–4–3	27	L
20	November 11	Atlanta	3 – 5	Tampa Bay		Lehtonen	20,034	12–5–3	27	L
21	November 17	Dallas	5 – 3	Atlanta		Hedberg	18,545	12–6–3	27	L
22	November 18	Atlanta	1 – 3	Montreal		Hedberg	21,273	12–7–3	27	L
23	November 22	Atlanta	4 – 2	Washington		Hedberg	11,284	13–7–3	29	W
24	November 24	Atlanta	2 – 3	Tampa Bay	OT	Lehtonen	19,922	13–7–4	30	OTL
25	November 25	Florida	0 – 1	Atlanta		Lehtonen	17,053	14–7–4	32	W
26	November 28	Atlanta	5 – 4	NY Rangers	OT	Lehtonen	18,200	15–7–4	34	W
27	November 30	Toronto	0 – 5	Atlanta		Lehtonen	15,092	16–7–4	36	W

December: 7–4–2 (home: 3–1–2; road: 4–3–0)

Game	Date	Visitor	Score	Home	OT	Decision	Attendance	Record	Points	Recap
28	December 2	Atlanta	3 – 1	Florida		Lehtonen	13,333	17–7–4	38	W
29	December 5	Atlanta	5 – 2	Toronto		Hedberg	19,507	18–7–4	40	W
30	December 7	Atlanta	0 – 8	Tampa Bay		Lehtonen	17,704	18–8–4	40	L
31	December 9	Pittsburgh	4 – 3	Atlanta	OT	Lehtonen	18,687	18–8–5	41	OTL
32	December 13	Anaheim	2 – 1	Atlanta		Lehtonen	16,028	18–9–5	41	L
33	December 15	Washington	3 – 2	Atlanta	OT	Lehtonen	16,920	18–9–6	42	OTL
34	December 16	Atlanta	0 – 6	NY Islanders		Hedberg	10,452	18–10–6	42	L
35	December 19	Atlanta	4 – 3	New Jersey	SO	Lehtonen	10,116	19–10–6	44	W
36	December 21	Pittsburgh	3 – 4	Atlanta	SO	Lehtonen	17,328	20–10–6	46	W
37	December 23	New Jersey	2 – 5	Atlanta		Lehtonen	17,548	21–10–6	48	W
38	December 26	Tampa Bay	1 – 2	Atlanta		Lehtonen	16,356	22–10–6	50	W
39	December 27	Atlanta	4 – 2	Pittsburgh		Lehtonen	17,132	23–10–6	52	W
40	December 30	Atlanta	1 – 4	Buffalo		Lehtonen	18,690	23–11–6	52	L

January: 6–5–2 (home: 3–2–1; road: 3–3–1)

Game	Date	Visitor	Score	Home	OT	Decision	Attendance	Record	Points	Recap
41	January 1	Atlanta	3 – 2	Ottawa	OT	Lehtonen	19,707	24–11–6	54	W
42	January 2	Atlanta	1 – 5	Minnesota		Lehtonen	18,568	24–12–6	54	L
43	January 5	Phoenix	5 – 4	Atlanta	OT	Hedberg	18,545	24–12–7	55	OTL
44	January 6	Atlanta	2 – 3	Washington	OT	Lehtonen	15,642	24–12–8	56	OTL
45	January 9	Atlanta	2 – 4	Montreal		Lehtonen	21,273	24–13–8	56	L
46	January 12	Atlanta	1 – 2	New Jersey		Lehtonen	13,249	24–14–8	56	L
47	January 13	Atlanta	4 – 3	Carolina	SO	Lehtonen	18,639	25–14–8	58	W
48	January 16	Los Angeles	2 – 6	Atlanta		Lehtonen	13,205	26–14–8	60	W
49	January 18	Montreal	4 – 1	Atlanta		Lehtonen	14,025	26–15–8	60	L
50	January 20	Atlanta	3 – 1	NY Rangers		Lehtonen	18,200	27–15–8	62	W
51	January 26	NY Islanders	4 – 5	Atlanta	OT	Lehtonen	18,089	28–15–8	64	W
52	January 28	Philadelphia	2 – 1	Atlanta		Lehtonen	18,598	28–16–8	64	L
53	January 30	New Jersey	4 – 5	Atlanta	SO	Lehtonen	12,162	29–16–8	66	W

February: 3–7–2 (home: 0–3–2; road: 3–4–0)

Game	Date	Visitor	Score	Home	OT	Decision	Attendance	Record	Points	Recap
54	February 1	NY Islanders	5 – 2	Atlanta		Lehtonen	13,543	29–17–8	66	L
55	February 3	Philadelphia	5 – 2	Atlanta		Lehtonen	18,622	29–18–8	66	L
56	February 6	Buffalo	4 – 3	Atlanta	SO	Lehtonen	17,881	29–18–9	67	OTL
57	February 8	Atlanta	6 – 3	Colorado		Lehtonen	17,428	30–18–9	69	W
58	February 10	Atlanta	2 – 3	Vancouver		Lehtonen	18,630	30–19–9	69	L
59	February 11	Atlanta	1 – 5	Edmonton		Hedberg	16,839	30–20–9	69	L
60	February 13	Atlanta	1 – 4	Calgary		Lehtonen	19,289	30–21–9	69	L
61	February 17	Atlanta	3 – 5	Ottawa		Lehtonen	19,881	30–22–9	69	L
62	February 20	Atlanta	3 – 1	Carolina		Hedberg	16,228	31–22–9	71	W
63	February 22	Tampa Bay	5 – 4	Atlanta	OT	Hedberg	16,032	31–22–10	72	OTL
64	February 24	Carolina	4 – 1	Atlanta		Lehtonen	18,774	31–23–10	72	L
65	February 26	Atlanta	3 – 2	Boston		Lehtonen	16,417	32–23–10	74	W

March: 9–4–1 (home: 8–1–0; road: 1–3–1)

Game	Date	Visitor	Score	Home	OT	Decision	Attendance	Record	Points	Recap
66	March 2	Ottawa	2 – 4	Atlanta		Lehtonen	16,190	33–23–10	76	W
67	March 4	Carolina	1 – 3	Atlanta		Lehtonen	17,783	34–23–10	78	W
68	March 6	Florida	2 – 4	Atlanta		Lehtonen	12,566	35–23–10	80	W
69	March 8	Montreal	2 – 6	Atlanta		Lehtonen	14,528	36–23–10	82	W
70	March 10	Atlanta	2 – 3	Florida		Lehtonen	17,927	36–24–10	82	L
71	March 12	Washington	2 – 4	Atlanta		Lehtonen	14,041	37–24–10	84	W
72	March 15	Atlanta	2 – 3	Philadelphia		Lehtonen	19,122	37–25–10	84	L
73	March 16	NY Rangers	1 – 2	Atlanta	OT	Hedberg	18,457	38–25–10	86	W
74	March 18	Buffalo	3 – 4	Atlanta	OT	Lehtonen	18,602	39–25–10	88	W
75	March 22	San Jose	5 – 1	Atlanta		Lehtonen	16,367	39–26–10	88	L
76	March 24	Atlanta	1 – 2	Pittsburgh		Lehtonen	17,132	39–27–10	88	L
77	March 28	Atlanta	2 – 3	Florida	SO	Lehtonen	12,864	39–27–11	89	OTL
78	March 29	Toronto	2 – 3	Atlanta	OT	Hedberg	17,062	40–27–11	91	W
79	March 31	Atlanta	3 – 2	Boston		Lehtonen	16,218	41–27–11	93	W

April: 2–1–0 (home: 1–1–0; road: 1–0–0)

Game	Date	Visitor	Score	Home	OT	Decision	Attendance	Record	Points	Recap
80	April 4	Washington	3 – 2	Atlanta		Lehtonen	18,783	41–28–11	93	L
81	April 6	Atlanta	4 – 1	Carolina		Hedberg	17,158	42–28–11	95	W
82	April 7	Tampa Bay	2 – 3	Atlanta	SO	Lehtonen	18,756	43–28–11	97	W

Legend: W Win (2 points) L Loss (0 points) OTL Overtime/shootout loss (1 point)

=== Playoffs ===
2007 Stanley Cup playoffs
Eastern Conference quarterfinals vs. (6) New York Rangers – Rangers win 4–0

Game	Date	Visitor	Score	Home	OT	Decision	Attendance	Series	Recap
1	April 12	NY Rangers	4 – 3	Atlanta		Lehtonen	18,857	0–1	L
2	April 14	NY Rangers	2 – 1	Atlanta		Hedberg	18,803	0–2	L
3	April 17	Atlanta	0 – 7	NY Rangers		Lehtonen	18,200	0–3	L
4	April 18	Atlanta	2 – 4	NY Rangers		Hedberg	18,200	0–4	L

Legend: W Win L Loss

== Player statistics ==
=== Scoring ===
- Position abbreviations: C = Center; D = Defense; G = Goaltender; LW = Left wing; RW = Right wing
- † = Joined team via a transaction (e.g., trade, waivers, signing) during the season. Stats reflect time with the Thrashers only.
- ‡ = Left team via a transaction (e.g., trade, waivers, release) during the season. Stats reflect time with the Thrashers only.

No.	Player	Pos	Regular season						Playoffs					
No.	Player	Pos	GP	G	A	Pts	+/-	PIM	GP	G	A	Pts	+/-	PIM
18	Marian Hossa	RW	82	43	57	100	18	49	4	0	1	1	−6	6
13	Vyacheslav Kozlov	LW	81	28	52	80	9	36	4	0	0	0	−6	6
17	Ilya Kovalchuk	LW	82	42	34	76	−2	66	4	1	1	2	−1	19
19	Scott Mellanby	RW	69	12	24	36	−9	63	4	0	0	0	−2	4
14	Jon Sim	LW	77	17	12	29	−1	60	4	0	0	0	−1	0
16	Bobby Holik	C	82	11	18	29	−3	86	4	0	1	1	0	0
9	Glen Metropolit‡	C	57	12	16	28	9	20	—	—	—	—	—	—
7	Greg de Vries	D	82	3	21	24	−3	66	4	1	0	1	−2	4
20	Steve Rucchin	C	47	5	16	21	−4	14	—	—	—	—	—	—
28	Niclas Havelid	D	77	3	18	21	−2	52	4	0	2	2	−5	0
23	Jim Slater	C	74	5	14	19	8	62	4	0	0	0	−2	2
5	Steve McCarthy	D	46	4	12	16	4	24	—	—	—	—	—	—
25	Andy Sutton	D	55	2	14	16	6	76	4	0	0	0	−2	10
22	Eric Belanger†	C	24	9	6	15	0	12	4	1	0	1	−6	12
8	Keith Tkachuk†	LW	18	7	8	15	8	34	4	1	2	3	2	12
77	Alexei Zhitnik†	D	18	2	12	14	4	14	4	0	0	0	−4	4
29	Brad Larsen	LW	72	7	6	13	−11	39	4	0	2	2	1	0
11	J. P. Vigier	RW	72	5	8	13	0	27	—	—	—	—	—	—
39	Niko Kapanen‡	C	60	4	9	13	−12	20	—	—	—	—	—	—
34	Shane Hnidy	D	72	5	7	12	15	63	4	1	0	1	−1	0
3	Vitaly Vishnevski‡	D	52	3	9	12	−5	31	—	—	—	—	—	—
2	Garnet Exelby	D	58	2	8	10	2	56	4	0	0	0	−1	6
36	Eric Boulton	LW	45	3	4	7	2	49	4	0	0	0	−1	24
9	Pascal Dupuis†	LW	17	3	2	5	−6	4	4	1	2	3	2	4
10	Jason Krog‡†	C	14	1	3	4	3	6	—	—	—	—	—	—
4	Braydon Coburn‡	D	29	0	4	4	1	30	—	—	—	—	—	—
12	Denis Hamel†‡	LW	3	1	0	1	0	0	—	—	—	—	—	—
1	Johan Hedberg	G	21	0	1	1		6	2	0	0	0		0
32	Kari Lehtonen	G	68	0	1	1		6	2	0	0	0		0
6	Mark Popovic	D	3	0	1	1	1	0	—	—	—	—	—	—
38	Darren Haydar	RW	4	0	0	0	0	0	—	—	—	—	—	—
21	Derek MacKenzie	C	4	0	0	0	1	0	—	—	—	—	—	—

=== Goaltending ===
No.	Player	Regular season										Playoffs								
No.	Player	GP	W	L	OT	SA	GA	GAA	SV%	SO	TOI	GP	W	L	SA	GA	GAA	SV%	SO	TOI
32	Kari Lehtonen	68	34	24	9	2075	183	2.79	.912	4	3934	2	0	2	73	11	5.59	.849	0	118
1	Johan Hedberg	21	9	4	2	500	51	2.89	.898	0	1057	2	0	2	69	5	2.55	.928	0	117

== Awards and records ==
=== Awards ===
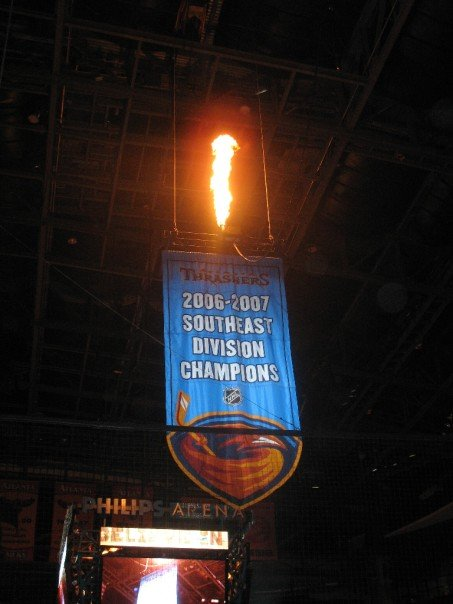

Type	Award/honor	Recipient	Ref
League (in-season)	NHL All-Star Game selection	Bob Hartley (coach)	
League (in-season)	NHL All-Star Game selection	Marian Hossa	
League (in-season)	NHL First Star of the Week	Ilya Kovalchuk (October 29)	
League (in-season)	NHL First Star of the Week	Vyacheslav Kozlov (November 12)	
League (in-season)	NHL First Star of the Week	Kari Lehtonen (March 4)	
League (in-season)	NHL Second Star of the Month	Ilya Kovalchuk (October)	
League (in-season)	NHL Second Star of the Month	Marian Hossa (November)	
League (in-season)	NHL Third Star of the Week	Marian Hossa (December 3)	
League (in-season)	NHL YoungStars Game selection	Kari Lehtonen	
Team	Community Service Award	Scott Mellanby	
Team	Dan Snyder Memorial Trophy	Vyacheslav Kozlov	
Team	Players' Player Award	Johan Hedberg	
Team	Team MVP	Marian Hossa	
Team	Three Stars of the Game Award	Marian Hossa	

== Transactions ==
The Thrashers were involved in the following transactions from June 20, 2006, the day after the deciding game of the 2006 Stanley Cup Final, through June 6, 2007, the day of the deciding game of the 2007 Stanley Cup Final.

=== Trades ===
Date	Details		Ref
June 24, 2006	To Dallas Stars: Jaroslav Modry; Patrik Stefan	To Atlanta Thrashers: Niko Kapanen; 7th-round pick in 2006	
June 24, 2006	To Edmonton Oilers: 3rd-round pick in 2006	To Atlanta Thrashers: 3rd-round pick in 2006; 7th-round pick in 2006	
August 17, 2006	To Anaheim Ducks: Karl Stewart; 2nd-round pick in 2007; Conditional 4th-round pick in 2008	To Atlanta Thrashers: Vitali Vishnevski	
February 1, 2007	To Tampa Bay Lightning: Stephen Baby; Kyle Wanvig	To Atlanta Thrashers: Andy Delmore; Andre Deveaux	
February 10, 2007	To Nashville Predators: Vitali Vishnevski	To Atlanta Thrashers: Eric Belanger	
February 24, 2007	To Philadelphia Flyers: Braydon Coburn	To Atlanta Thrashers: Alexei Zhitnik	
February 25, 2007	To St. Louis Blues: Glen Metropolit; 1st-round pick in 2007; 3rd round pick in 2007; 2nd-round pick in 2008; Conditional 1st-round pick in 2008 (Note: Condition not met. The Blues would have received this pick if Tkachuk re-signed with Atlanta. Atlanta traded Tkachuk back to St. Louis on June 26, where he re-signed on June 30.)	To Atlanta Thrashers: Keith Tkachuk	
February 27, 2007	To New York Rangers: Alex Bourret 3rd-round pick in 2007	To Atlanta Thrashers: Pascal Dupuis	

=== Players acquired ===
Date	Player	Former team	Term	Via	Ref
June 21, 2006	Cory Larose	SCL Tigers (NLA)		Free agency	
July 1, 2006	Johan Hedberg	Dallas Stars	2-year	Free agency	
July 3, 2006	Glen Metropolit	HC Lugano (NLA)		Free agency	
July 3, 2006	Steve Rucchin	New York Rangers		Free agency	
July 4, 2006	Fred Brathwaite	Ak Bars Kazan (RSL)		Free agency	
July 4, 2006	Darren Haydar	Nashville Predators		Free agency	
July 4, 2006	Jason Krog	Frolunda HC (SHL)		Free agency	
July 6, 2006	Dave Caruso	Ohio State University (CCHA)		Free agency	
July 13, 2006	Jon Sim	Florida Panthers		Free agency	
July 18, 2006	Kyle Wanvig	Minnesota Wild		Free agency	
August 31, 2006	Joey Crabb	Colorado College (WCHA)		Free agency	
February 10, 2007	Denis Hamel	Ottawa Senators		Waivers	
February 27, 2007	Jason Krog	New York Rangers		Waivers	

=== Players lost ===
Date	Player	New team	Via (Note: In parentheses is the player's free agency group on July 1 if applicable.)	Ref
July 1, 2006	Marc Savard	Boston Bruins	Free agency (III)	
July 6, 2006	Tomas Kloucek	Columbus Blue Jackets	Free agency (UFA)	
July 20, 2006	Travis Roche	Phoenix Coyotes	Free agency (VI)	
July 21, 2006	Ramzi Abid	Nashville Predators	Free agency (VI)	
July 24, 2006	Ronald Petrovicky	Pittsburgh Penguins	Free agency (III)	
July 28, 2006	Brian Maloney	Ottawa Senators	Free agency (UFA)	
July 31, 2006	Serge Aubin	Geneve-Servette HC (NLA)	Free agency (III)	
August 25, 2006	Jeff Dwyer	SG Cortina (Serie A)	Free agency (UFA)	
September 7, 2006	Adam Berkhoel	Buffalo Sabres	Free agency (UFA)	
September 29, 2006	Mike Dunham	New York Islanders	Free agency (III)	
October 3, 2006	Steve Shields	Houston Aeros (AHL)	Free agency (III)	
October 3, 2006	Joel Stepp	Gwinnett Gladiators (ECHL)	Free agency (UFA)	
October 4, 2006	Scott Barney	Grand Rapids Griffins (AHL)	Free agency (VI)	
October 4, 2006	Francis Lessard	Hartford Wolf Pack (AHL)	Free agency (UFA)	
December 9, 2006	Peter Bondra	Chicago Blackhawks	Free agency (III)	
January 12, 2007	Jason Krog	New York Rangers	Waivers	
February 27, 2007	Denis Hamel	Philadelphia Flyers	Waivers	
February 27, 2007	Niko Kapanen	Phoenix Coyotes	Waivers	
April 24, 2007	Scott Mellanby		Retirement	

=== Signings ===
Date	Player	Term	Contract type	Ref
June 21, 2006	Eric Boulton		Re-signing	
June 21, 2006	Brad Larsen		Re-signing	
June 29, 2006	Steve McCarthy		Re-signing	
July 1, 2006	Scott Mellanby	1-year	Re-signing	
July 6, 2006	Brett Sterling		Entry-level	
July 13, 2006	Mark Popovic		Re-signing	
July 13, 2006	Colin Stuart		Re-signing	
July 18, 2006	Kevin Doell		Re-signing	
July 18, 2006	Derek MacKenzie		Re-signing	
July 18, 2006	Karl Stewart		Re-signing	
July 20, 2006	Niko Kapanen	multi-year	Re-signing	
August 7, 2006	J. P. Vigier		Re-signing	
August 14, 2006	Jordan Smotherman	3-year	Entry-level	
September 7, 2006	Kari Lehtonen	2-year	Re-signing	
September 11, 2006	Alex Bourret		Entry-level	
May 31, 2007	Chad Denny		Entry-level	
May 31, 2007	Ondrej Pavelec		Entry-level	
May 31, 2007	Tomas Pospisil		Entry-level	
May 31, 2007	Myles Stoesz		Entry-level	
June 1, 2007	Tobias Enstrom		Entry-level	

== Draft picks ==
Atlanta's picks at the 2006 NHL entry draft in Vancouver, British Columbia. Atlanta had the 12th overall draft pick.

Round	#	Player	Nationality	NHL team	College/Junior/Club team (League)
1	12	Bryan Little (C)	Canada	Atlanta Thrashers	Barrie Colts (OHL)
2	43	Riley Holzapfel (C)	Canada	Atlanta Thrashers	Moose Jaw Warriors (WHL)
3	80	Michael Forney (LW)	United States	Atlanta Thrashers (from Edmonton)	Thief River Falls High School (USHS–MS)
5	135	Alex Kangas (G)	United States	Buffalo Sabres	Sioux Falls Stampede (USHL)
6	165	Jonas Enlund (C)	Finland	Atlanta Thrashers	HIFK Jr. (Finland)
7	195	Jesse Martin (C)	Canada	Atlanta Thrashers	Spruce Grove Saints (AJHL)
7	200	Arturs Kulda (D)	Latvia	Atlanta Thrashers (from Edmonton)	CSKA Moscow (RSL)
7	210	Will O'Neill (D)	United States	Atlanta Thrashers (from Dallas)	Tabor Academy (USHS–MA)

== See also ==
- 2006–07 NHL season
