= 1996–97 OHL season =

Junior ice hockey season

1996-97 OHL season
- League: Ontario Hockey League
- Sport: Hockey
- Duration: Regular season Sept 1996 – Mar 1997; Playoffs; March – April 1997
- Teams: 23

Draft
- Top draft pick: Rico Fata
- Picked by: London Knights

Regular season
- Hamilton Spectator Trophy: Ottawa 67's (3)
- Season MVP: Alyn McCauley (Ottawa 67's)
- Top scorer: Marc Savard (Oshawa Generals)

Playoffs
- Finals champions: Oshawa Generals (12)
- Runners-up: Ottawa 67's

OHL seasons
- 1995–96 1997–98

1996-97 CHL season
- League: Canadian Hockey League
- Sport: Hockey
- Duration: QMJHL; Sept. 20, 1996 – Mar. 14, 1997; OHL; Sept. 1996 – Mar. 1997; WHL; Sept. 1996 – Mar. 1997
- Teams: 60
- Season MVP: Alyn McCauley (Ottawa 67's) (OHL)
- Top scorer: Pavel Rosa (Hull Olympiques) (QMJHL)

Memorial Cup
- Finals champions: Hull Olympiques (QMHL) (2nd title)
- Runners-up: Lethbridge Hurricanes (WHL)

The 1996–97 OHL season was the 17th season of the Ontario Hockey League. The Niagara Falls Thunder move to Erie becoming the Erie Otters. Seventeen teams each played 66 games. The Oshawa Generals won the J. Ross Robertson Cup, defeating the Ottawa 67's.

== Relocation ==
=== Niagara Falls Thunder to Erie Otters ===
The Niagara Falls Thunder relocated to Erie, and renamed their club to the Erie Otters, becoming the second team in the Ontario Hockey League to be based in the United States and the first OHL team in the state of Pennsylvania. The Thunder played in Niagara Falls from 1988 to 1996, reaching the post-season in seven of their eight seasons. Niagara Falls went to the J. Ross Robertson Cup one time in their eight seasons, in their first season in 1988-89, where they lost to the Peterborough Petes in the final round.

The Otters new home arena was the Erie Civic Center. The club would remain in the Central Division.

== New Arena ==
=== Detroit Whalers ===
After splitting the 1995-96 season between the Palace of Auburn Hills and Oak Park Ice Arena, the Detroit Whalers moved into their new home, the Compuware Sports Arena, based in Plymouth, Michigan.

== Regular season ==
=== Final standings ===
Note: DIV = Division; GP = Games played; W = Wins; L = Losses; T = Ties; OTL = Overtime losses; GF = Goals for; GA = Goals against; PTS = Points; x = clinched playoff berth; y = clinched division title; z = earned first round bye

=== East Division ===
Rank	Team	GP	W	L	T	PTS	GF	GA
1	z-Ottawa 67's	66	49	11	6	104	320	177
2	x-Oshawa Generals	66	41	18	7	89	287	202
3	x-Peterborough Petes	66	39	25	2	80	251	238
4	x-Kingston Frontenacs	66	25	35	6	56	257	277
5	x-Belleville Bulls	66	22	37	7	51	235	278
6	North Bay Centennials	66	14	44	8	36	214	337

=== Central Division ===
Rank	Team	GP	W	L	T	PTS	GF	GA
1	z-Kitchener Rangers	66	34	22	10	78	274	235
2	x-Guelph Storm	66	35	25	6	76	300	251
3	x-Barrie Colts	66	33	23	10	76	272	236
4	x-Owen Sound Platers	66	27	37	2	56	258	318
5	x-Erie Otters	66	23	36	7	53	240	260
6	Sudbury Wolves	66	21	37	8	50	251	302

=== West Division ===
Rank	Team	GP	W	L	T	PTS	GF	GA
1	y-Sault Ste. Marie Greyhounds	66	39	17	10	88	309	220
2	x-Sarnia Sting	66	35	24	7	77	286	251
3	x-Windsor Spitfires	66	29	29	8	66	303	285
4	x-Detroit Whalers	66	26	34	6	58	230	270
5	London Knights	66	13	51	2	28	215	365

=== Scoring leaders ===
Player	Team	GP	G	A	Pts	PIM
Marc Savard	Oshawa Generals	64	43	87	130	94
Joe Thornton	Sault Ste. Marie Greyhounds	59	41	81	122	123
Alyn McCauley	Ottawa 67's	50	56	56	112	16
Richard Uniacke	Sault Ste. Marie Greyhounds	66	44	66	110	36
Trevor Letowski	Sarnia Sting	55	35	73	108	51
Todd Norman	Guelph Storm	66	47	68	105	41
Joe Seroski	Sault Ste. Marie Greyhounds	61	54	49	103	14
Jan Bulis	Barrie Colts	64	42	61	103	42
Jonathan Sim	Sarnia Sting	64	56	39	95	109
Matt Cooke	Windsor Spitfires	65	45	50	95	146

== Playoffs ==
The 67's waived their right to a first-round bye, having lost in the second round the previous season after accepting a first-round bye.

Division quarterfinals
E2	Oshawa	bye
E3	Peterborough	4
E4	Kingston	1
C1	Kitchener	bye
W2	Sarnia	4
W3	Windsor	1
E1	Ottawa	4
E5	Belleville	2
C3	Barrie	4
C4	Owen Sound	0
W1	S.S. Marie	4
W4	Detroit	1
C2	Guelph	4
C5	Erie	1

Quarterfinals
E2	Oshawa	4
E3	Peterborough	2
C1	Kitchener	4
W2	Sarnia	3
E1	Ottawa	4
C3	Barrie	1
W1	S.S. Marie	2
C2	Guelph	4

Semifinals
E2	Oshawa	4
C1	Kitchener	2
E1	Ottawa	4
C2	Guelph	3

Finals
E2	Oshawa	4
E1	Ottawa	2

=== Division quarter-finals ===
==== East Division ====
===== (1) Ottawa 67's vs. (5) Belleville Bulls =====
March 16	Belleville Bulls	2 – 6	Ottawa 67's	Ottawa Civic Centre

March 18	Ottawa 67's	2 – 4	Belleville Bulls	Yardmen Arena

March 21	Belleville Bulls	3 – 5	Ottawa 67's	Ottawa Civic Centre

March 22	Ottawa 67's	4 – 5	Belleville Bulls	Yardmen Arena

March 23	Belleville Bulls	4 – 5	Ottawa 67's	Ottawa Civic Centre

March 25	Ottawa 67's	6 – 3	Belleville Bulls	Yardmen Arena

Ottawa wins series 4 – 2

===== (3) Peterborough Petes vs. (4) Kingston Frontenacs =====
March 16	Peterborough Petes	4 – 5	Kingston Frontenacs	Kingston Memorial Centre

March 18	Kingston Frontenacs	2 – 6	Peterborough Petes	Peterborough Memorial Centre

March 20	Kingston Frontenacs	1 – 9	Peterborough Petes	Peterborough Memorial Centre

March 21	Peterborough Petes	3 – 2	OT	Kingston Frontenacs	Kingston Memorial Centre

March 23	Kingston Frontenacs	3 – 6	Peterborough Petes	Peterborough Memorial Centre

Peterborough wins series 4 – 1

==== Central Division ====
===== (2) Guelph Storm vs. (5) Erie Otters =====
March 16	Erie Otters	4 – 2	Guelph Storm	Guelph Memorial Gardens

March 19	Guelph Storm	4 – 1	Erie Otters	Erie Civic Center

March 21	Guelph Storm	6 – 5	OT	Erie Otters	Erie Civic Center

March 22	Erie Otters	3 – 5	Guelph Storm	Guelph Memorial Gardens

March 24	Erie Otters	1 – 2	Guelph Storm	Guelph Memorial Gardens

Guelph wins series 4 – 1

===== (3) Barrie Colts vs. (4) Owen Sound Platers =====
March 16	Owen Sound Platers	3 – 8	Barrie Colts	Barrie Molson Centre

March 18	Barrie Colts	5 – 4	OT	Owen Sound Platers	Bayshore Community Centre

March 20	Owen Sound Platers	4 – 6	Barrie Colts	Barrie Molson Centre

March 22	Barrie Colts	6 – 2	Owen Sound Platers	Bayshore Community Centre

Barrie wins series 4 – 0

==== West Division ====
===== (1) Sault Ste. Marie Greyhounds vs. (4) Detroit Whalers =====
March 16	Detroit Whalers	3 – 4	Sault Ste. Marie Greyhounds	Sault Memorial Gardens

March 17	Detroit Whalers	0 – 3	Sault Ste. Marie Greyhounds	Sault Memorial Gardens

March 21	Sault Ste. Marie Greyhounds	8 – 3	Detroit Whalers	Compuware Sports Arena

March 22	Sault Ste. Marie Greyhounds	3 – 4	OT	Detroit Whalers	Compuware Sports Arena

March 24	Detroit Whalers	1 – 4	Sault Ste. Marie Greyhounds	Sault Memorial Gardens

Sault Ste. Marie wins series 4 – 1

===== (2) Sarnia Sting vs. (3) Windsor Spitfires =====
March 16	Windsor Spitfires	5 – 6	Sarnia Sting	Sarnia Arena

March 17	Sarnia Sting	5 – 3	Windsor Spitfires	Windsor Arena

March 19	Windsor Spitfires	4 – 7	Sarnia Sting	Sarnia Arena

March 20	Sarnia Sting	3 – 6	Windsor Spitfires	Windsor Arena

March 23	Windsor Spitfires	3 – 8	Sarnia Sting	Sarnia Arena

Sarnia wins series 4 – 1

=== OHL quarter-finals ===
==== (E1) Ottawa 67's vs. (C3) Barrie Colts ====
March 29	Ottawa 67's	4 – 3	Barrie Colts	Barrie Molson Centre

April 1	Barrie Colts	2 – 7	Ottawa 67's	Ottawa Civic Centre

April 3	Barrie Colts	2 – 7	Ottawa 67's	Ottawa Civic Centre

April 5	Ottawa 67's	3 – 5	Barrie Colts	Barrie Molson Centre

April 7	Barrie Colts	2 – 5	Ottawa 67's	Ottawa Civic Centre

Ottawa wins series 4 – 1

==== (W1) Sault Ste. Marie Greyhounds vs. (C2) Guelph Storm ====
March 29	Guelph Storm	4 – 3	OT	Sault Ste. Marie Greyhounds	Sault Memorial Gardens

March 30	Guelph Storm	4 – 3	Sault Ste. Marie Greyhounds	Sault Memorial Gardens

April 3	Sault Ste. Marie Greyhounds	7 – 3	Guelph Storm	Guelph Memorial Gardens

April 4	Sault Ste. Marie Greyhounds	9 – 3	Guelph Storm	Guelph Memorial Gardens

April 6	Guelph Storm	5 – 2	Sault Ste. Marie Greyhounds	Sault Memorial Gardens

April 8	Sault Ste. Marie Greyhounds	4 – 9	Guelph Storm	Guelph Memorial Gardens

Guelph wins series 4 – 2

==== (C1) Kitchener Rangers vs. (W2) Sarnia Sting ====
March 28	Sarnia Sting	0 – 5	Kitchener Rangers	Kitchener Memorial Auditorium

March 30	Kitchener Rangers	4 – 1	Sarnia Sting	Sarnia Arena

April 2	Sarnia Sting	4 – 0	Kitchener Rangers	Kitchener Memorial Auditorium

April 5	Kitchener Rangers	5 – 2	Sarnia Sting	Sarnia Arena

April 7	Sarnia Sting	7 – 6	Kitchener Rangers	Kitchener Memorial Auditorium

April 8	Kitchener Rangers	1 – 3	Sarnia Sting	Sarnia Arena

April 10	Sarnia Sting	3 – 7	Kitchener Rangers	Kitchener Memorial Auditorium

Kitchener wins series 4 – 3

==== (E2) Oshawa Generals vs. (E3) Peterborough Petes ====
March 30	Peterborough Petes	1 – 4	Oshawa Generals	Oshawa Civic Auditorium

April 1	Oshawa Generals	4 – 0	Peterborough Petes	Peterborough Memorial Centre

April 3	Peterborough Petes	1 – 3	Oshawa Generals	Oshawa Civic Auditorium

April 5	Oshawa Generals	3 – 5	Peterborough Petes	Peterborough Memorial Centre

April 6	Peterborough Petes	4 – 3	Oshawa Generals	Oshawa Civic Auditorium

April 8	Oshawa Generals	5 – 3	Peterborough Petes	Peterborough Memorial Centre

Oshawa wins series 4 – 2

=== OHL semi-finals ===
==== (E1) Ottawa 67's vs. (C2) Guelph Storm ====
April 11	Guelph Storm	4 – 5	OT	Ottawa 67's	Ottawa Civic Centre

April 13	Ottawa 67's	6 – 4	Guelph Storm	Guelph Memorial Gardens

April 16	Guelph Storm	3 – 4	Ottawa 67's	Ottawa Civic Centre

April 18	Ottawa 67's	0 – 4	Guelph Storm	Guelph Memorial Gardens

April 20	Guelph Storm	4 – 3	Ottawa 67's	Ottawa Civic Centre

April 22	Ottawa 67's	2 – 3	OT	Guelph Storm	Guelph Memorial Gardens

April 23	Guelph Storm	3 – 6	Ottawa 67's	Ottawa Civic Centre

Ottawa wins series 4 – 3

==== (C1) Kitchener Rangers vs. (E2) Oshawa Generals ====
April 12	Oshawa Generals	5 – 3	Kitchener Rangers	Kitchener Memorial Auditorium

April 13	Kitchener Rangers	2 – 5	Oshawa Generals	Oshawa Civic Auditorium

April 15	Oshawa Generals	3 – 4	OT	Kitchener Rangers	Kitchener Memorial Auditorium

April 16	Kitchener Rangers	1 – 4	Oshawa Generals	Oshawa Civic Auditorium

April 17	Oshawa Generals	4 – 5	Kitchener Rangers	Kitchener Memorial Auditorium

April 21	Kitchener Rangers	1 – 6	Oshawa Generals	Oshawa Civic Auditorium

Oshawa wins series 4 – 2

=== J. Ross Robertson Cup ===
==== (E1) Ottawa 67's vs. (E2) Oshawa Generals ====
April 26	Oshawa Generals	4 – 5	OT	Ottawa 67's	Ottawa Civic Centre

April 28	Ottawa 67's	4 – 5	Oshawa Generals	Oshawa Civic Auditorium

April 30	Oshawa Generals	3 – 4	OT	Ottawa 67's	Ottawa Civic Centre

May 2	Ottawa 67's	2 – 4	Oshawa Generals	Oshawa Civic Auditorium

May 4	Oshawa Generals	4 – 3	Ottawa 67's	Ottawa Civic Centre

May 6	Ottawa 67's	4 – 5	OT	Oshawa Generals	Oshawa Civic Auditorium

Oshawa wins series 4 – 2

== All-Star teams ==
=== First team ===
- Alyn McCauley, Centre, Ottawa 67's
- Daniel Cleary, Left Wing, Belleville Bulls
- Cameron Mann, Right Wing, Peterborough Petes
- Sean Blanchard, Defence, Ottawa 67's
- Andy Delmore, Defence, Sarnia Sting
- Zac Bierk, Goaltender, Peterborough Petes
- Brian Kilrea, Coach, Ottawa 67's

=== Second team ===
- Joe Thornton, Centre, Sault Ste. Marie Greyhounds
- Dave Duerden, Left Wing, Peterborough Petes
- Alexandre Volchkov, Right Wing, Barrie Colts
- D.J. Smith, Defence, Windsor Spitfires
- Marty Wilford, Defence, Oshawa Generals
- Kory Cooper, Goaltender, Belleville Bulls
- Bill Stewart, Coach, Oshawa Generals

=== Third team ===
- Jan Bulis, Centre, Barrie Colts
- Dwayne Hay, Left Wing, Guelph Storm
- Joel Trottier, Right Wing, Ottawa 67's
- Nick Boynton, Defence, Ottawa 67's
- Chris Hajt, Defence, Guelph Storm
- Robert Esche, Goaltender, Detroit Whalers
- Peter DeBoer, Coach, Detroit Whalers

== Awards ==
J. Ross Robertson Cup:	Oshawa Generals
Hamilton Spectator Trophy:	Ottawa 67's
Leyden Trophy:	Ottawa 67's
Emms Trophy:	Kitchener Rangers
Bumbacco Trophy:	Sault Ste. Marie Greyhounds
Red Tilson Trophy:	Alyn McCauley, Ottawa 67's
Eddie Powers Memorial Trophy:	Marc Savard, Oshawa Generals
Matt Leyden Trophy:	Brian Kilrea, Ottawa 67's
Jim Mahon Memorial Trophy:	Joe Seroski, Sault Ste. Marie Greyhounds
Max Kaminsky Trophy:	Sean Blanchard, Ottawa 67's
OHL Goaltender of the Year:	Zac Bierk, Peterborough Petes
Jack Ferguson Award:	Charlie Stephens, Toronto St. Michael's Majors
Dave Pinkney Trophy:	Tim Keyes and Craig Hillier, Ottawa 67's
OHL Executive of the Year:	Ed Rowe, Peterborough Petes
Bill Long Award:	Wren Blair, Kingston Frontenacs & Frank Bonello, Ontario Hockey League
Emms Family Award:	Peter Sarno, Windsor Spitfires
F.W. 'Dinty' Moore Trophy:	Shawn Degagne, Kitchener Rangers
OHL Humanitarian of the Year:	Mike Martone, Peterborough Petes
William Hanley Trophy:	Alyn McCauley, Ottawa 67's
Leo Lalonde Memorial Trophy:	Zac Bierk, Peterborough Petes
Bobby Smith Trophy:	Jake McCracken, Sault Ste. Marie Greyhounds

== 1997 OHL Priority Selection ==
On June 7, 1997, the OHL conducted the 1997 Ontario Hockey League Priority Selection at Maple Leaf Gardens in Toronto, Ontario. The expansion team Toronto St. Michael's Majors, who were set to begin play during the 1997-98 season, held the first overall pick in the draft, and selected Charlie Stephens from the Leamington Flyers. Stephens was awarded the Jack Ferguson Award, awarded to the top pick in the draft.

Below are the players who were selected in the first round of the 1997 Ontario Hockey League Priority Selection.

#	Player	Nationality	OHL Team	Hometown	Minor Team
1	Charlie Stephens (C)	Canada	Toronto St. Michael's Majors	London, Ontario	Leamington Flyers
2	John Erskine (D)	Canada	London Knights	Kingston, Ontario	Quinte Hawks
3	Brett Angel (D)	Canada	North Bay Centennials	Kingston, Ontario	Kingston Voyageurs
4	Taylor Pyatt (LW)	Canada	Sudbury Wolves	Thunder Bay, Ontario	Thunder Bay Kings
5	Jonathan Cheechoo (RW)	Canada	Belleville Bulls	Moose Factory, Ontario	Kitchener Dutchmen
6	Tim Connolly (C)	United States	Erie Otters	Syracuse, New York	Syracuse Jr. Crunch
7	Jamie Young (LW)	Canada	Kingston Frontenacs	Thunder Bay, Ontario	Thunder Bay Kings
8	Dave Stephenson (D)	Canada	Owen Sound Platers	Woodstock, Ontario	Cambridge Winter Hawks
9	David Legwand (C)	United States	Plymouth Whalers	Detroit, Michigan	Compuware Ambassadors
10	Mike Rupp (C)	United States	Windsor Spitfires	Cleveland, Ohio	Cleveland Barons
11	Adam DeLeeuw (LW)	Canada	Barrie Colts	Brampton, Ontario	Brampton Capitals
12	Dusty Jamieson (LW)	Canada	Guelph Storm	Forest, Ontario	St. Thomas Stars
13	Robb Palahnuk (LW)	Canada	Sarnia Sting	Sault Ste. Marie, Ontario	Elmira Sugar Kings
14	Barry Graham (D)	Canada	Kitchener Rangers	Murillo, Ontario	Thunder Bay Kings
15	Preston Mizzi (C)	Canada	Peterborough Petes	Sault Ste. Marie Greyhounds	Newmarket Hurricanes
16	Cory Pecker (RW)	Canada	Sault Ste. Marie Greyhounds	Montreal, Quebec	Lac St-Louis Lions
17	Brad Ralph (C)	Canada	Oshawa Generals	Richmond Hill, Ontario	Kanata Valley Lasers
18	Jonathan Zion (D)	Canada	Ottawa 67's	Nepean, Ontario	Nepean Raiders

== See also ==
- List of OHA Junior A standings
- List of OHL seasons
- 1997 Memorial Cup
- 1997 NHL entry draft
- 1996 in sports
- 1997 in sports

Preceded by 1995–96 OHL season	OHL seasons	Succeeded by 1997–98 OHL season
