= Jan Bulis =

Czech ice hockey player (born 1978)

- Born: 18 March 1978 (age 48) Pardubice, Czechoslovakia
- Position: Centre
- Shot: Left
- Played for: Washington Capitals; Montreal Canadiens; HC Pardubice; Vancouver Canucks; Atlant Moscow Oblast; Traktor Chelyabinsk
- National team: Czech Republic
- NHL draft: 43rd overall, 1996; Washington Capitals
- Playing career: 1997–2015

Jan Bulis (Czech pronunciation: [ˈjan ˈbulɪs]) (born 18 March 1978) is a Czech former professional hockey winger who last played as the Captain of Traktor Chelyabinsk of the Kontinental Hockey League (KHL). He spent nine seasons in the National Hockey League (NHL), playing with the Washington Capitals, Montreal Canadiens, and Vancouver Canucks. The Capitals selected Bulis in the 1996 NHL entry draft.

== Playing career ==
Bulis was drafted by the Washington Capitals in the 1996 NHL entry draft, Second Round, Forty-third Overall. Bulis was a fan favourite while playing for the Barrie Colts of the OHL and was among the top players in the OHL at that time from 1995 to 1997. In Bulis' top season for Barrie he accumulated 42 goals and 61 assists for a total of 103 points in 64 games. Unfortunately, that offensive potential did not show up in the NHL where he totalled of 251 points in 587 games played.

He has played for the Vancouver Canucks, Montreal Canadiens, Washington Capitals, AHL Portland Pirates, IHL Cincinnati Cyclones, OHL Kingston Frontenacs and Barrie Colts. On 13 March 2001, Bulis was traded from the Washington Capitals along with Richard Zedník and a first-round pick (Alexander Perezhogin) to the Montreal Canadiens for Dainius Zubrus, Trevor Linden and a second-round draft pick (later traded to the Tampa Bay Lightning, who selected Andreas Holmqvist). During the 2004–05 NHL lockout, Bulis played for HC Pardubice in the Czech Republic Elite League. He scored 24 goals and had 25 assists in 45 games played. Bulis recorded his best NHL season in 2005–06 with Montreal where he scored 20 goals and 20 assists for 40 points in 73 games played. During the campaign in December 2005, Bulis was named to the Czech national ice hockey team for the 2006 Winter Olympics in Turin. It was the first time that Bulis played for the Czech National Team. On 25 January 2006, Bulis scored four goals in four shots against the Philadelphia Flyers.

== Transactions ==
- 22 June, 1996 - Drafted by the Washington Capitals in the 2nd round, 43rd overall.
- 13 March 2001 - Traded to the Montreal Canadiens along with Richard Zednik and a 1st round selection in the 2001 NHL entry draft (Alexander Perezhogin) in exchange for Trevor Linden, Dainius Zubrus, and a 2nd round selection in the 2001 NHL entry draft (previously acquired, later traded to the Tampa Bay Lightning - Andreas Holmqvist).
- 25 July 2006 - Signed as an unrestricted free agent by the Vancouver Canucks.
- On 4 May 2011, Bulis moved from KHL's Atlant Mytishchi to Traktor Chelyabinsk.
- April 2012 - Signed one-year contract with Traktor Chelyabinsk.

== Career statistics ==
=== Regular season and playoffs ===
			Regular season					Playoffs
Season	Team	League	GP	G	A	Pts	PIM	GP	G	A	Pts	PIM
1993–94	HC Pardubice	CZE U20	25	16	11	17	—	—	—	—	—	—
1994–95	Kelowna Spartans	BCHL	51	23	25	48	36	17	7	9	16	0
1995–96	Barrie Colts	OHL	59	29	30	59	22	7	2	3	5	2
1996–97	Barrie Colts	OHL	64	42	61	103	42	9	3	7	10	10
1997–98	Washington Capitals	NHL	48	5	11	16	18	—	—	—	—	—
1997–98	Portland Pirates	AHL	3	1	4	5	12	—	—	—	—	—
1997–98	Kingston Frontenacs	OHL	2	0	1	1	0	12	8	10	18	12
1998–99	Washington Capitals	NHL	38	7	16	23	6	—	—	—	—	—
1998–99	Cincinnati Cyclones	IHL	10	2	2	4	14	—	—	—	—	—
1999–2000	Washington Capitals	NHL	56	9	22	31	30	—	—	—	—	—
2000–01	Washington Capitals	NHL	39	5	13	18	26	—	—	—	—	—
2000–01	Portland Pirates	AHL	4	0	2	2	0	—	—	—	—	—
2000–01	Montreal Canadiens	NHL	12	0	5	5	0	—	—	—	—	—
2001–02	Montreal Canadiens	NHL	53	9	10	19	8	6	0	0	0	6
2002–03	Montreal Canadiens	NHL	82	16	24	40	30	—	—	—	—	—
2003–04	Montreal Canadiens	NHL	72	13	17	30	30	11	1	1	2	4
2004–05	HC Moeller Pardubice	ELH	45	24	25	49	113	16	7	4	11	43
2005–06	Montreal Canadiens	NHL	73	20	20	40	50	6	1	1	2	2
2006–07	Vancouver Canucks	NHL	79	12	11	23	70	12	1	1	2	0
2007–08	Khimik Moscow Oblast	RSL	57	18	29	47	106	5	0	0	0	4
2008–09	Atlant Moscow Oblast	KHL	35	9	8	17	16	—	—	—	—	—
2009–10	Atlant Moscow Oblast	KHL	56	25	18	43	68	4	1	2	3	4
2010–11	Atlant Moscow Oblast	KHL	42	14	15	29	62	24	4	6	10	26
2011–12	Traktor Chelyabinsk	KHL	43	5	14	19	68	16	1	2	3	4
2012–13	Traktor Chelyabinsk	KHL	49	16	15	31	32	25	9	2	11	16
2013–14	Traktor Chelyabinsk	KHL	49	11	8	19	44	—	—	—	—	—
2014–15	Traktor Chelyabinsk	KHL	43	5	8	13	52	6	0	0	0	4
NHL totals			552	96	149	245	268	35	3	3	6	14
KHL totals			317	85	86	171	342	75	15	12	27	54

=== International ===
Year	Team	Event	Result	GP	G	A	Pts	PIM
2006	Czech Republic	OG	3rd place, bronze medalist(s)	8	0	0	0	10
2006	Czech Republic	WC	2nd place, silver medalist(s)	9	0	0	0	0
Senior totals				17	0	0	0	10
