= Progressive Auto Sales Arena =

Multi-purpose arena in Sarnia, Ontario, Canada

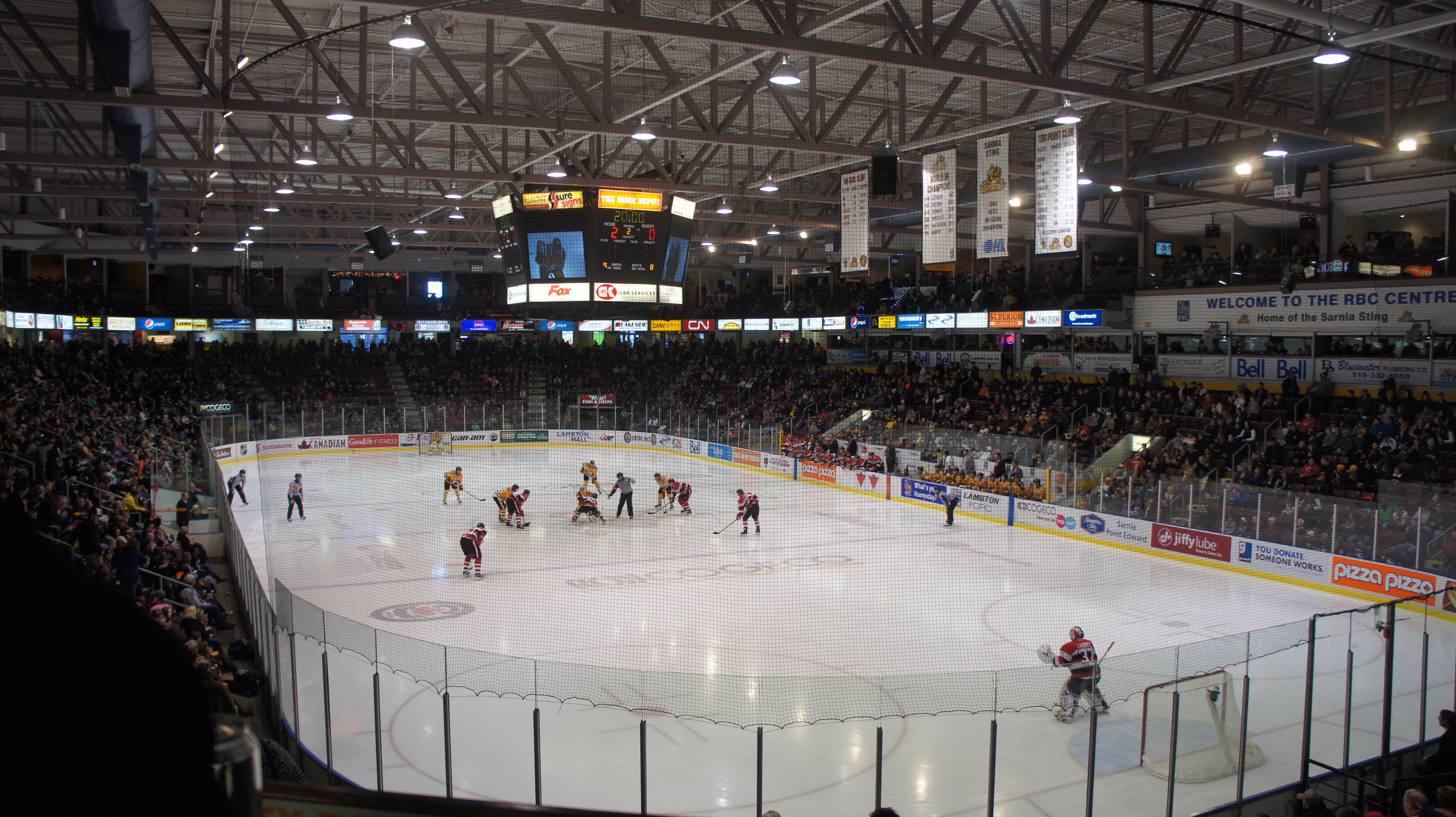

- Location within Ontario Location within Canada
- Former names: Sarnia Sports and Entertainment Centre (1999–2009; 2015–2016); RBC Centre (2009–2015)
- Address: 1455 London Road
- Location: Sarnia, Ontario, Canada
- Coordinates: 42°58′37″N 82°20′49″W
- Owner: City of Sarnia
- Operator: City of Sarnia
- Capacity: 4,118 (Hockey) (5,500 with standing room); 6,000 (Concerts)
- Executive suites: 43
- Type: Arena
- Events: sporting events, concerts
- Surface: Multi-surface
- Scoreboard: Yes
- Public transit: Route 9, Sarnia Transit

Construction
- Groundbreaking: 1997
- Opened: September 7, 1998
- Cost: CA$15.9 million ($28.6 million in 2025 dollars)
- Architect: PBK Architects
- Structural engineer: Schorn Consultants Inc.
- Services engineer: Integrated Engineering
- General contractor: Ball Construction Ltd.

Tenant
- Sarnia Sting (OHL) 1998–present

Website
- www.progressiveautosalesarena.com

The Progressive Auto Sales Arena is a 5,500-capacity (4,118-seated) multi-purpose arena in Sarnia, Ontario, Canada. It is located on the campus of Lambton College and opened in September 1998. The Progressive Auto Sales Arena is currently home to the Sarnia Sting OHL ice hockey team. The Sarnia Legionnaires (1969–) Junior B hockey club holds its training camp at the facility before moving to Pat Stapleton Arena for its regular schedule.

The arena features two NHL-sized ice pads, 43 luxury suites, and an in-house, full-service restaurant.

Artists such as Crash Test Dummies, Blue Man Group, Bryan Adams and Elton John have played there, and it has also hosted Stars on Ice.

== History ==
In 1994, the Newmarket Royals team was bought by the Ciccarelli brothers and moved to Sarnia, where they were renamed the Sarnia Sting. Though the Sting played their first three seasons at the Pat Stapleton Arena, their relocation was conditional on a new arena being built by the city. The new arena would also become an issue in the November 1994 municipal elections.

There were five sites up for consideration:

- The former CNR railway lands on the banks of the St. Clair River. Proponents argued that placing the new arena here would revitalize Sarnia's declining waterfront. CNR maintained that they would restore the grounds before selling it for development. However, opponents pointed out that the site is not located close to major highways or hotels. More importantly, it was adjacent to the Imperial Oil plant in Chemical Valley and company officials warned that they would be unable to evacuate the arena if an accident occurred.
- A vacant park, just next to CNR lands, bounded by Front Street, Christina Street, and Devine Street. Though considered a separate site, some suggested that it could be combined with the CNR lands for future expansion.
- The former Holmes Foundry Caposite Plant site, bounded by North Christina Street and Exmouth Street. This was considered the best location, since it was close to the Blue Water Bridge border crossing, Highway 402, and the nearby Venetian Boulevard had several hotels (Holiday Inn, Best Western Guildwood Inn), with another hotel (Days Inn) and the Sarnia Golf and Curling Club on Christina Street. However, this was located in the village of Point Edward and many Sarnians, for political reasons, were opposed to building their arena there. (It was considered a lengthy and complicated process for Sarnia to annex the land from Point Edward.)
- Lotte Neeley Park, on the northeast corner of the Highway 40-Highway 7 interchange (Highway 7 has since been downloaded to municipal authorities and renamed London Line 22). It has the advantage of being accessible to the aforementioned routes, Highway 402, and Sarnia Airport. In addition, there are plenty of motels and restaurants on Highway 7, which was known as the "Golden Mile" prior to being largely bypassed by Highway 402.
- Lambton College, where the arena could take advantage of vacant parking lots. The proposed arena would be close to the Canterbury Inn hotel (now Lambton Inn), and shopping establishments on Murphy Road and Exmouth Road, namely big box stores and Lambton Mall. It is also close to Highway 402 and Highway 40, and is a short distance from the Highway 7 motels and restaurants

Originally known as the Sarnia Sports and Entertainment Centre, the Royal Bank of Canada purchased the naming rights of the arena in October 2009 and renamed it RBC Centre. In September 2015, RBC chose to not renew the sponsorship, thus reverting the arena back to its original name. During the summer of 2016, the City of Sarnia reached an agreement with Progressive Auto Sales on a 10-year naming rights agreement. The new name became Progressive Auto Sales Arena. Renovations are taking place in December when the old scoreboard is going to be taken down along with the ad boards around the suites. A new LED scoreboard is being installed and a LED ribbon board around the suites and the approx. cost is $500,000.

== Renovations ==
In 2017, the team replaced the aging 8 sided scoreboard with a new OES 4 sided scoreboard along with an LED ribbon board around the suites. Since 2017, the team has also done various work throughout the arena to showcase the team colours and to highlight notable alumni. The team has also renovated all the suites in the arena. In 2023, the team will have a new dressing room within the arena that will create a team campus atmosphere. This required a new addition to the arena that was built in the south end where the team offices were once located. This allows the team to be located in one section and the team gym will be right across from the dressing room. The team will also be working on a Hall of Fame section in the south-west corner on the concourse that will highlight notable alumni and the history of the team. The team also added a new Kahlenberg goal horn in the arena. For the 2023–2024 season, the arena will feature new dasher boards with acrylic glass.

== Gallery ==
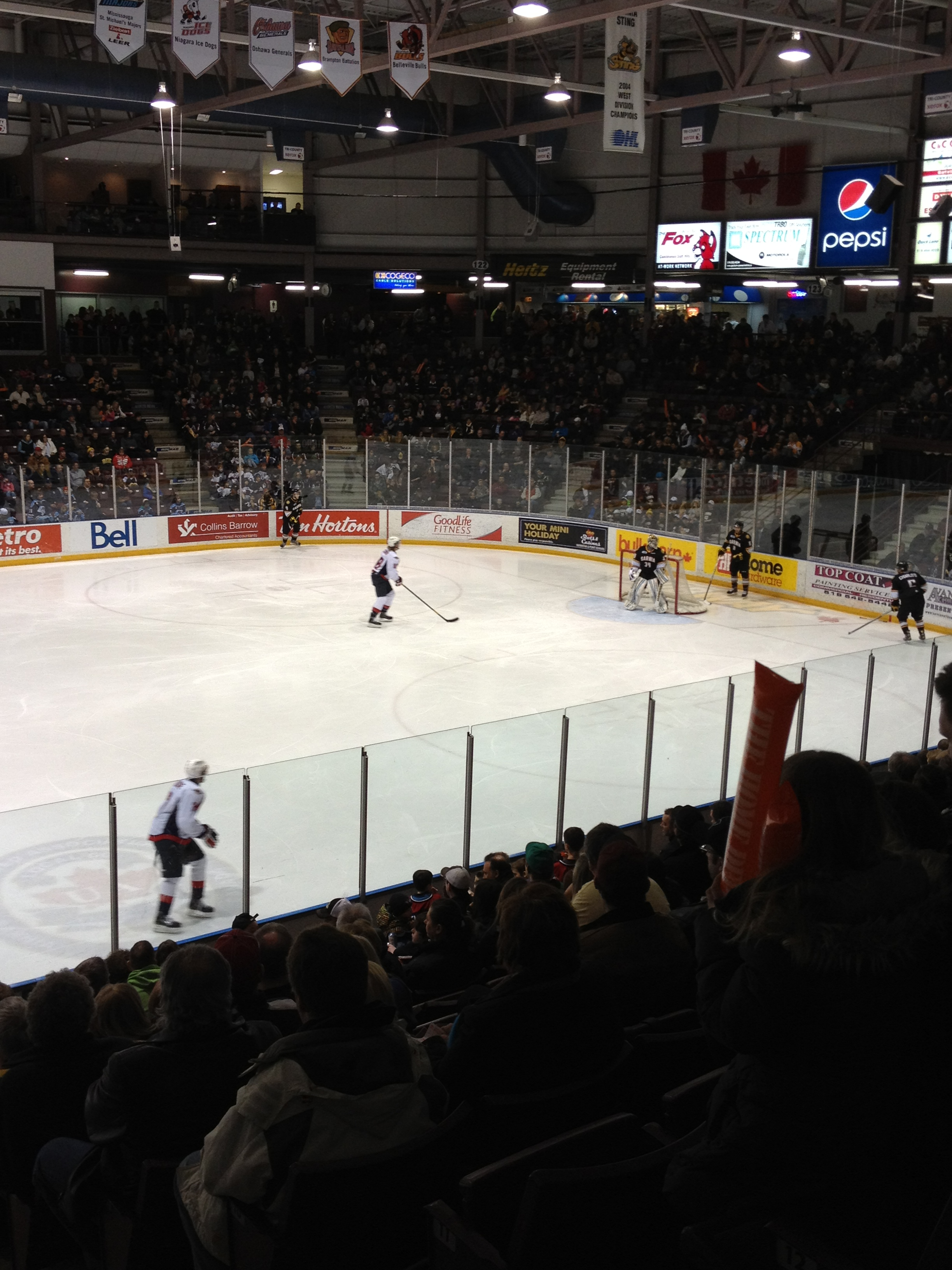
Sarnia Sting vs. Windsor Spitfires - January 2012

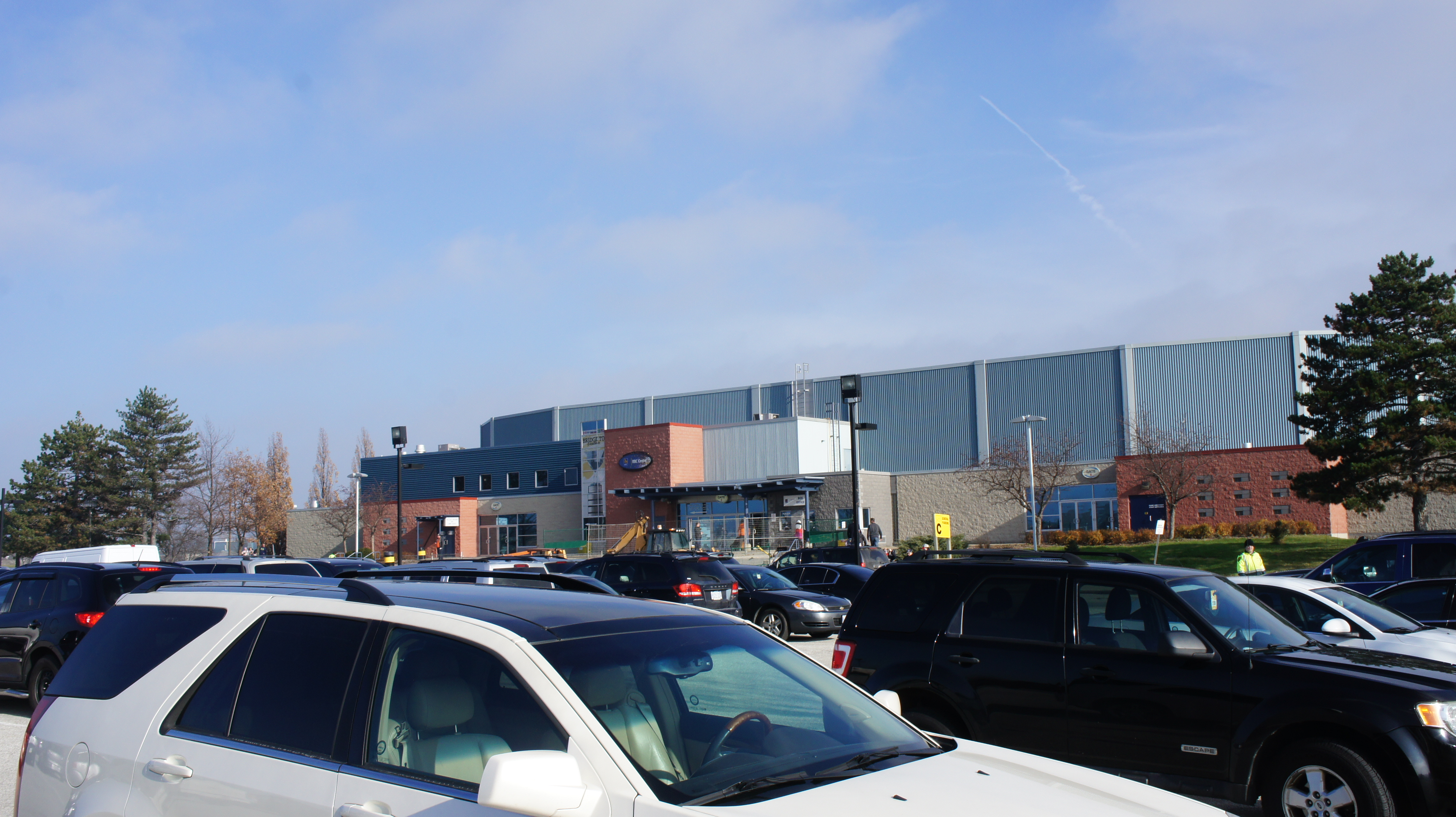
Exterior.JPG

== See also ==
Other arenas in the Sarnia area, past and present, include:

- Sarnia Arena
- Children's Arena
- Germain Park Arena
- Clearwater Arena
