= Sarnia Sting =

Ontario Hockey League team in Sarnia

- City: Sarnia, Ontario
- League: Ontario Hockey League
- Conference: Western
- Division: West
- Founded: 1994–95
- Home arena: Progressive Auto Sales Arena (capacity: 5,300)
- Colours: Black, white and gold
- Owners: Ryan Finch; David Legwand; Mark Guy
- General manager: Dylan Seca
- Head coach: Mathieu Turcotte
- Affiliates: Sarnia Legionnaires; Strathroy Rockets
- Website: www.sarniasting.com

Franchise history
- 1969–1992: Cornwall Royals
- 1992–1994: Newmarket Royals
- 1994–present: Sarnia Sting

Current uniform

The Sarnia Sting are a junior ice hockey team based in Sarnia, Ontario, Canada. They are one of the 20 teams that make up the Ontario Hockey League. They currently play out of the Progressive Auto Sales Arena (formerly the Sarnia Sports and Entertainment Centre).

On January 22, 2015, NHL forward David Legwand, who played for the Ottawa Senators at the time, and former NHL defenseman Derian Hatcher entered an agreement to purchase the Sarnia Sting. The transfer of ownership was approved by the OHL Board of Governors and completed on March 4, 2015.

== History ==
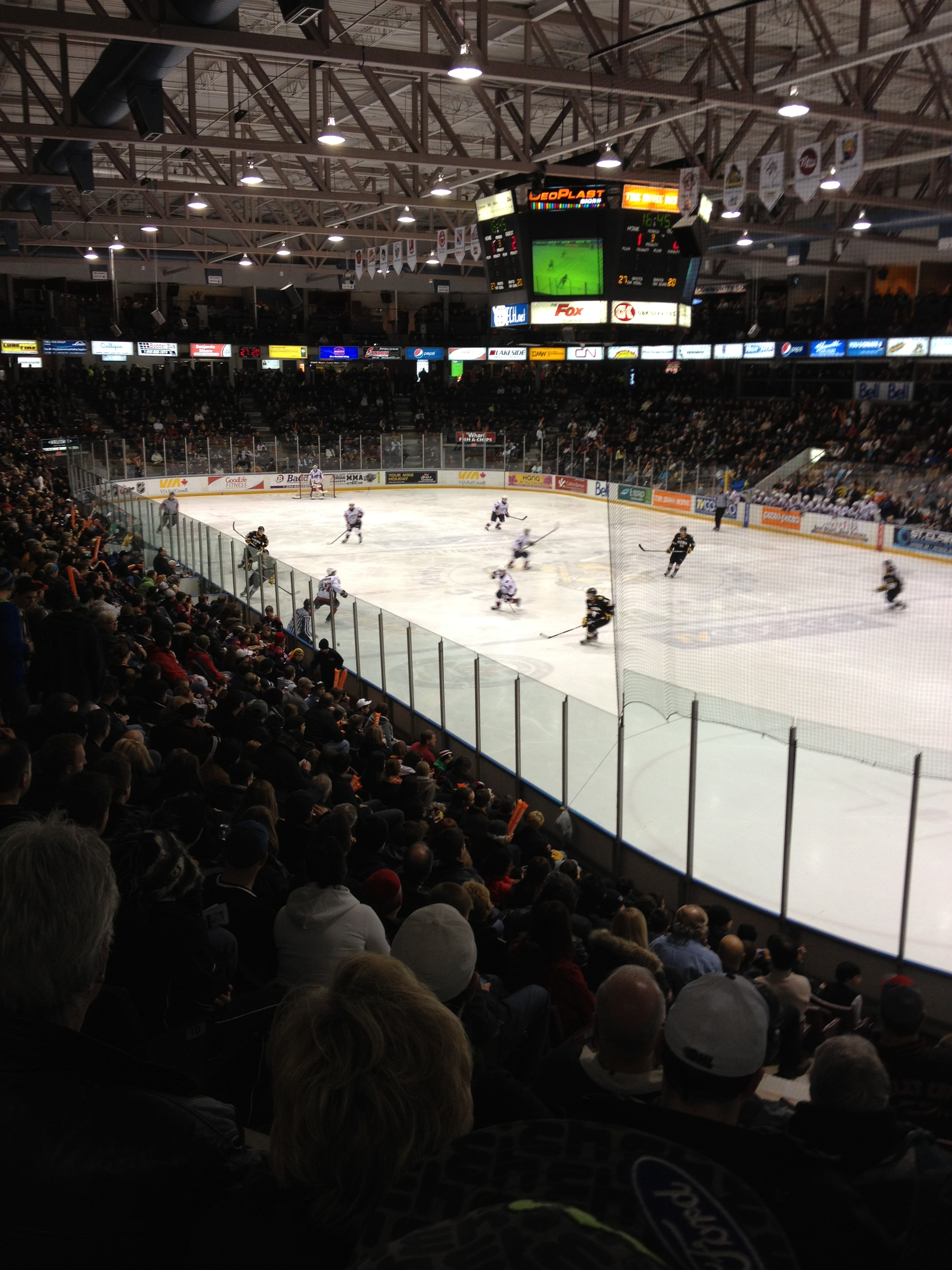
Sting vs. Spitfires - January 2012

The franchise was granted in 1969 as one of the inaugural teams of the Quebec Major Junior Hockey League. At the time, the team was located in Cornwall, Ontario and known as the Cornwall Royals. During the team's tenure in the QMJHL the Royals won the Memorial Cup in 1972, 1980, and in 1981.

For the 1981–82 season, the team transferred to the Ontario Hockey League. In 1992, the franchise moved again to Newmarket, Ontario to play as the Newmarket Royals.

In 1994, the team was bought by the Ciccarelli brothers and moved to Sarnia, Ontario. Robert Ciccarelli, voted OHL Executive of the Year in 1999–2000, was the team's president and governor until January 2015, when the team was sold to its current owners, former NHL defenseman Derian Hatcher and former NHL forward David Legwand.

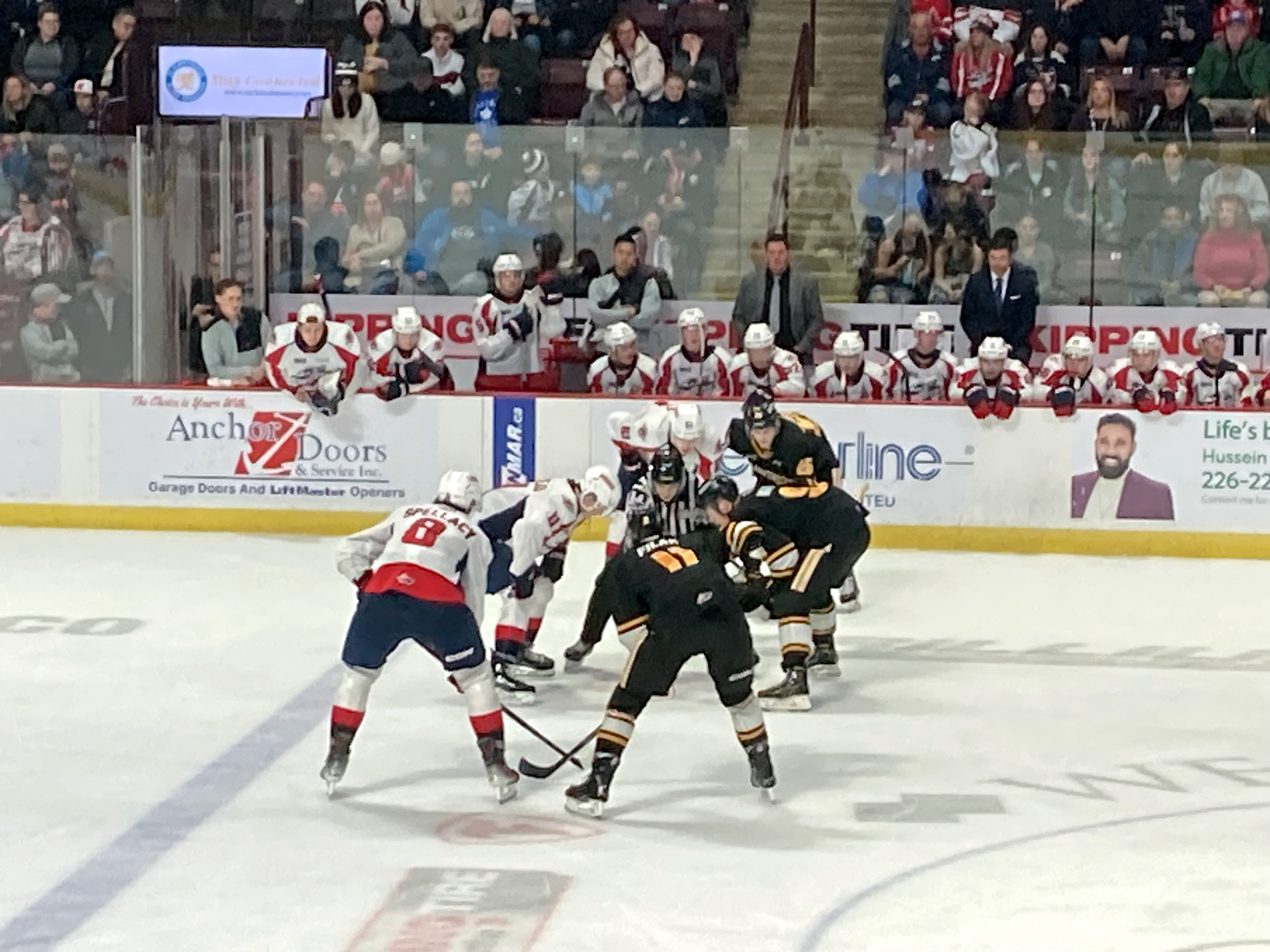
The Sting playing at the Windsor Spitfires in 2023

In 2018, Dan Carcillo made accusations of hazing during the 2002–03 OHL season. League commissioner David Branch responded with sanctions against the Sting. The club implemented changes in its routines to avoid further incidents. In the 2021 OHL Draft, the Sting became the first OHL team to draft a female player, selecting goalie Taya Currie 267th overall.

== Championships ==
The Sarnia Sting have yet to win their first J. Ross Robertson Cup and first Memorial Cup. The 2022-23 season was the closest the team came to the OHL Championship, but lost in the Western Conference Finals to London Knights 4 games to 2. Their first division title came in the 2003–04 season, when the team won the OHL West Division, winning the Bumbacco Trophy, but were later eliminated in the first round of the playoffs. The Sarnia Sting won their second West Division title in 2016. They beat the Guelph Storm 7–1 to clinch the division. That was their first division title in 12 years. On March 19, 2016, the Sarnia Sting broke a franchise record from 2002–03 capturing 41 wins and 91 points to end the 2015–16 OHL season.

== Coaches ==
- 1994–95 – D.Boyd, R.Brown, M.Hunter
- 1995–96 – Mark Hunter
- 1996–97 – Jos Canale
- 1997–99 – Mark Hunter
- 1999–2000 – Mark Hunter, Rich Brown
- 2000–01 – Rich Brown, Jeff Perry
- 2001–03 – Jeff Perry
- 2003–04 – Jeff Perry, Greg Walters
- 2004–06 – Shawn Camp
- 2006–10 – Dave MacQueen
- 2010–11 – Dave MacQueen, Trevor Letowski
- 2011–13 – Jacques Beaulieu
- 2013–15 – Trevor Letowski
- 2015–21 – Derian Hatcher
- 2021–25 – Alan Letang
- 2025–present – Mathieu Turcotte

== Players ==
=== Award winners ===
Bobby Smith Trophy
Scholastic player of the year.

- 2004–05 – Richard Clune
- 2006–07 – Steven Stamkos

CHL Rookie of the Year
CHL Rookie of the Year.

- 2010–11 – Nail Yakupov

Eddie Powers Memorial Trophy
OHL Top Point Scorer.

- 1995–96 – Aaron Brand
- 1998–99 – Peter Sarno

Emms Family Award
OHL Rookie of the Year.

- 2010–11 – Nail Yakupov

F.W. "Dinty" Moore Trophy
Best rookie goalie GAA.

- 1999–2000 – Andrew Sim
- 2002–03 – Ryan Munce

Ivan Tennant Memorial Award
Top academic high school player.

- 2004–05 – Matt Pelech

Jack Ferguson Award
First overall draft pick.

- 1994 – Jeff Brown
- 2006 – Steven Stamkos
- 2010 – Alex Galchenyuk
- 2014 – Jakob Chychrun

Jim Mahon Memorial Trophy
Top scoring Right Winger.

- 2008-09 – Justin DiBenedetto

Leo Lalonde Memorial Trophy
Overage player of the year.

- 1995–96 – Aaron Brand
- 2008–09 – Justin DiBenedetto
- 2012–13 – Charlie Sarault

OHL Executive of the Year
Top executive in the OHL.

- 1999–2000 – Robert Ciccarelli

=== Retired numbers ===
On January 12, 2018, the Sarnia Sting officially retired the first number in franchise history, Steven Stamkos' number 91. There are also banners in honour of Shawn Burr and Kerry Fraser. Banners that were once hung, but have since been taken down, include the ones of Aaron Brand and Peter Sarno, who both won OHL scoring titles, Trevor Letowski, who participated at IIHF World Junior Championships in 1997, and Danny Fritsche, who won gold with the United States men's national junior ice hockey team in 2004. The team has also created a Hall of Fame inside the arena. The inaugural induction members include Jon Sim, Letowski, and Rob Ciccarelli.

=== NHL alumni ===
- Jamie Arniel
- Reid Boucher
- Eric Boulton
- Sean Brown
- Daniel Carcillo
- Jakob Chychrun
- Richard Clune
- Larry Courville
- Mike Danton
- Andy Delmore
- Patrick DesRochers
- Justin DiBenedetto
- Jamie Fraser
- Dan Fritsche
- Alex Galchenyuk
- Trevor Gillies
- Nikolay Goldobin
- Micheal Haley
- Jeff Heerema
- Mark Katic
- Travis Konecny
- Jordan Kyrou
- Drew Larman
- Alan Letang
- Trevor Letowski
- Matt Martin
- Porter Martone
- Sean McMorrow
- Connor Murphy
- David Nemirovsky
- Kris Newbury
- Ivan Novoseltsev
- Matt Pelech
- Jacob Perreault
- Michael Pezzetta
- Marek Posmyk
- Dalton Prout
- Adam Ruzicka
- Peter Sarno
- Jon Sim
- Ryan Spooner
- Steven Stamkos
- Joey Tenute
- Mike Van Ryn
- Ryan Wilson
- Nail Yakupov
- Pavel Zacha
- Jeff Zehr

== Season-by-season results ==
Regular season and playoffs results:

Legend: GP = Games played, W = Wins, L = Losses, T = Ties, OTL = Overtime losses, SL = Shoot-out losses, Pts = Points, GF = Goals for, GA = Goals against

| Memorial Cup champions | OHL champions | OHL finalists |

| Season | Regular season | | | | | | | | | | | Playoffs |
| Season | GP | W | L | T | OTL | SOL | Pts | Pct | GF | GA | Finish | Playoffs |
|---|---|---|---|---|---|---|---|---|---|---|---|---|
| 1994–95 | 66 | 24 | 37 | 5 | — | — | 53 | 0.402 | 250 | 292 | 3rd West | Lost division quarterfinal (Windsor Spitfires) 4–0 |
| 1995–96 | 66 | 39 | 23 | 4 | — | — | 82 | 0.621 | 330 | 276 | 2nd West | Won division quarterfinal (Sault Ste. Marie Greyhounds) 4–0; Lost quarterfinal (Peterborough Petes) 4–2 |
| 1996–97 | 66 | 35 | 24 | 7 | — | — | 77 | 0.583 | 286 | 251 | 2nd West | Won division quarterfinal (Windsor Spitfires) 4–1; Lost quarterfinal (Kitchener Rangers) 4–3 |
| 1997–98 | 66 | 32 | 21 | 13 | — | — | 77 | 0.583 | 253 | 227 | 3rd West | Lost division quarterfinal (Plymouth Whalers) 4–1 |
| 1998–99 | 68 | 37 | 25 | 6 | — | — | 80 | 0.588 | 279 | 216 | 2nd West | Lost conference quarterfinal (London Knights) 4–3 |
| 1999–2000 | 68 | 33 | 27 | 8 | 0 | — | 74 | 0.544 | 211 | 189 | 3rd West | Lost conference quarterfinal (Windsor Spitfires) 4–3 |
| 2000–01 | 68 | 28 | 31 | 7 | 2 | — | 65 | 0.478 | 235 | 244 | 3rd West | Lost conference quarterfinal (Plymouth Whalers) 4–0 |
| 2001–02 | 68 | 27 | 29 | 5 | 7 | — | 66 | 0.485 | 236 | 260 | 4th West | Lost conference quarterfinal (Erie Otters) 4–1 |
| 2002–03 | 68 | 41 | 19 | 7 | 1 | — | 90 | 0.662 | 234 | 223 | 2nd West | Lost conference quarterfinal (Guelph Storm) 4–2 |
| 2003–04 | 68 | 37 | 23 | 4 | 4 | — | 82 | 0.603 | 220 | 210 | 1st West | Lost conference quarterfinal (Erie Otters) 4–1 |
| 2004–05 | 68 | 16 | 41 | 6 | 5 | — | 43 | 0.316 | 156 | 228 | 5th West | Did not qualify |
| 2005–06 | 68 | 17 | 46 | — | 2 | 3 | 39 | 0.287 | 197 | 295 | 5th West | Did not qualify |
| 2006–07 | 68 | 34 | 24 | — | 5 | 5 | 78 | 0.574 | 270 | 241 | 4th West | Lost conference quarterfinal (Kitchener Rangers) 4–0 |
| 2007–08 | 68 | 37 | 29 | — | 2 | 0 | 76 | 0.559 | 251 | 229 | 3rd West | Won conference quarterfinal (Windsor Spitfires) 4–1; Lost conference semifinal (Kitchener Rangers) 4–0 |
| 2008–09 | 68 | 35 | 26 | — | 4 | 3 | 77 | 0.566 | 216 | 210 | 4th West | Lost conference quarterfinal (Plymouth Whalers) 4–1 |
| 2009–10 | 68 | 17 | 46 | — | 3 | 2 | 39 | 0.287 | 184 | 295 | 5th West | Did not qualify |
| 2010–11 | 68 | 25 | 36 | — | 5 | 2 | 57 | 0.419 | 243 | 321 | 4th West | Did not qualify |
| 2011–12 | 68 | 34 | 27 | — | 2 | 5 | 75 | 0.551 | 243 | 235 | 2nd West | Lost conference quarterfinal (Saginaw Spirit) 4–2 |
| 2012–13 | 68 | 35 | 28 | — | 1 | 4 | 75 | 0.551 | 247 | 254 | 3rd West | Lost conference quarterfinal (Plymouth Whalers) 4–0 |
| 2013–14 | 68 | 17 | 44 | — | 2 | 5 | 41 | 0.301 | 211 | 341 | 5th West | Did not qualify |
| 2014–15 | 68 | 29 | 32 | — | 4 | 3 | 65 | 0.478 | 232 | 263 | 3rd West | Lost conference quarterfinal (Erie Otters) 4–1 |
| 2015–16 | 68 | 42 | 19 | — | 5 | 2 | 91 | 0.669 | 254 | 192 | 1st West | Lost conference quarterfinal (Sault Ste. Marie Greyhounds) 4–3 |
| 2016–17 | 68 | 31 | 30 | — | 6 | 1 | 69 | 0.507 | 257 | 277 | 4th West | Lost conference quarterfinal (Erie Otters) 4–0 |
| 2017–18 | 68 | 46 | 17 | — | 4 | 1 | 97 | 0.713 | 299 | 213 | 2nd West | Won conference quarterfinal (Windsor Spitfires) 4–2; Lost conference semifinal (Kitchener Rangers) 4–2 |
| 2018–19 | 68 | 28 | 33 | — | 5 | 2 | 63 | 0.463 | 271 | 300 | 3rd West | Lost conference quarterfinal (Saginaw Spirit) 4–0 |
| 2019–20 | 62 | 22 | 34 | — | 5 | 1 | 50 | 0.403 | 244 | 299 | 5th West | Playoffs cancelled due to the COVID-19 pandemic |
| 2020–21 | Season cancelled due to the COVID-19 pandemic | | | | | | | | | | | |
| 2021–22 | 68 | 27 | 36 | — | 4 | 1 | 59 | 0.434 | 234 | 279 | 4th West | Lost conference quarterfinal (Windsor Spitfires) 4–2 |
| 2022–23 | 68 | 41 | 18 | — | 5 | 4 | 91 | 0.669 | 298 | 224 | 2nd West | Won conference quarterfinal (Guelph Storm) 4–2; Won conference semifinal (Saginaw Spirit) 4–0; Lost conference final (London Knights) 4–2 |
| 2023–24 | 68 | 25 | 39 | — | 3 | 1 | 54 | 0.397 | 204 | 292 | 4th West | Did not qualify |
| 2024–25 | 68 | 22 | 33 | — | 6 | 7 | 57 | 0.419 | 197 | 286 | 5th West | Did not qualify |
| 2025–26 | 68 | 21 | 38 | — | 8 | 1 | 51 | 0.375 | 205 | 289 | 5th West | Did not qualify |

== Jerseys and logos ==
The original Sarnia Sting jersey logo

The original Sarnia Sting jersey (worn from 1994/95 - 1998/99) showed a bee playing hockey with its stinger poised. The team's colours were black, white and silver. An alternate jersey (worn from 1997/98 - 1998/99) had a yellow background and a bee holding a stick above the Sarnia name on the chest.

The current jerseys include a white jersey with a bee in the centre and a black jersey with a bee in the centre. The team got new jerseys during the 2019-20 season. During the first half of the season, the team wears the white uniform at home while during the second half of the season they wear the black uniform at home.

During the 2012 offseason, the team held a contest to design the team's alternate jersey for the season. The new jersey is yellow with black and white stripes down the arm. The logo is round and includes a picture of the Blue Water Bridge in the background with a bee in the centre. Around the bridges and the bee it is inscribed "Sarnia Sting" on top and "Hockey Club" on the bottom.

== Arenas ==
Relocation from Newmarket, Ontario in 1994 was made on the promise that a new arena would be built in Sarnia. In the meantime, the team played their first four seasons at Sarnia Arena located in the downtown area.

In 1998, the Sting played their first season at their new home, The Sarnia Sports and Entertainment Centre (now known as the Progressive Auto Sales Arena). It's a more modern facility with private boxes and many other amenities. The new building also hosted the Ontario Hockey League All Star Game in 1999, and the RE/Max Canada-Russia Challenge in 2004.

== See also ==
- List of ice hockey teams in Ontario
