= Andy Delmore =

Canadian ice hockey player (born 1976)

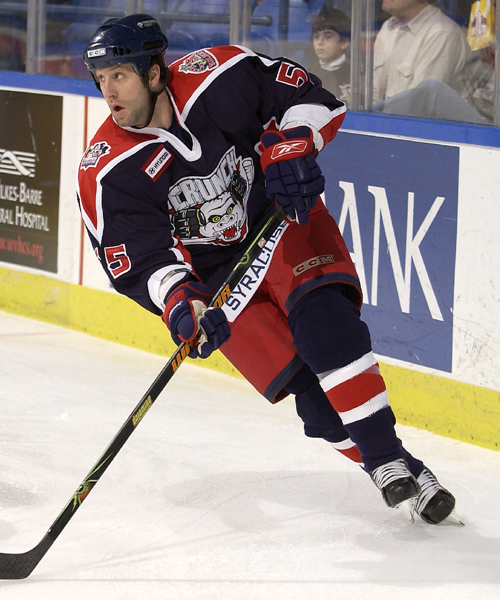
- Delmore with the Syracuse Crunch in 2005
- Born: December 26, 1976 (age 49) LaSalle, Ontario, Canada
- Height: 6 ft 1 in (185 cm)
- Weight: 200 lb (91 kg; 14 st 4 lb)
- Position: Defence
- Shot: Right
- Played for: Philadelphia Flyers; Nashville Predators; Buffalo Sabres; Columbus Blue Jackets
- National team: Canada
- NHL draft: Undrafted
- Playing career: 1997–2013

Andrew J. Delmore (born December 26, 1976) is a Canadian former professional ice hockey defenceman. Delmore played 283 games in the National Hockey League (NHL), recording 43 goals and 58 assists for 101 points. He was considered an offensive defenceman, valued for his proficiency on the power play. He is currently an assistant coach with the Windsor Spitfires of the OHL.

== Playing career ==
A 6'0" defenceman, Delmore played junior hockey for the North Bay Centennials and later for the Sarnia Sting of the Ontario Hockey League (OHL). He went undrafted in 1997 and signed as a free agent with the Philadelphia Flyers, making his NHL debut during the 1998–99 season. Delmore was the first rookie defenceman to record a hat-trick in the playoffs. He also scored the overtime winner in Game 3 of the 2000 Eastern Conference Semifinals as Philadelphia defeated the Pittsburgh Penguins, 4–3. While playing for the Nashville Predators during the 2002–03 NHL season, he tied Sergei Gonchar and Nicklas Lidström for most goals (18) by a defenseman.

Delmore was traded twice on March 9, 2004; the Sabres first traded him to the San Jose Sharks (along with Curtis Brown) for Jeff Jillson and a ninth-round draft pick, and he was then traded again to the Boston Bruins for future considerations. He did not see any game action for Boston through the end of the season. During the 2004–05 NHL lockout, Delmore played in Germany with Adler Mannheim of the Deutsche Eishockey Liga (DEL).

Delmore signed with the Detroit Red Wings to a one-year contract on August 16, 2005. However, he did not play a regular season game for the club and was claimed by the Columbus Blue Jackets off waivers on October 4, 2005. Delmore played the majority of the 2005–06 season for the Syracuse Crunch of the American Hockey League (AHL), playing only seven games in the NHL. He won the Eddie Shore Award as the top defenceman in the AHL and was named to the AHL First All-Star Team.

On July 1, 2006, Delmore signed a one-year contract with the Tampa Bay Lightning. He was then assigned to their AHL affiliate, the Springfield Falcons, to start the 2006–07 season. After 47 games with the Falcons, Delmore was traded by the Lightning (along with André Deveaux) to the Atlanta Thrashers in exchange for Kyle Wanvig and Stephen Baby on February 1, 2007.

Delmore returned to Germany when he signed a two-year contract with the Hamburg Freezers of the DEL on July 17, 2007.

After a two-year absence, Delmore returned to North America for the 2009–10 season when the Detroit Red Wings again signed Delmore to a one-year contract on July 28, 2009. Delmore was then assigned to their AHL affiliate, the Grand Rapids Griffins. On March 3, 2010, he was traded to the Calgary Flames in exchange for Riley Armstrong. He was then assigned to Flames' AHL affiliate, the Abbotsford Heat.

On October 24, 2010, Delmore left again for Europe to sign a one-year contract with Norwegian team Lørenskog IK. Delmore spent the following two seasons amongst the Austrian Hockey League and Italian Serie A before announcing his retirement at the conclusion of the 2012–13 season.

== Coaching ==
Since retiring as a player, Delmore has been an assistant coach with the Sarnia Sting for two seasons, then with the Toledo Walleye from the 2016-17 to 2019-2020 seasons, and the Windsor Spitfires from 2021-22.

== Awards ==
- 1996–97 – OHL First All-Star Team
- 2005–06 – AHL First All-Star Team
- 2005–06 – AHL Eddie Shore Award

== Records ==
- Holds Philadelphia Flyers record for most goals (5) by a defenceman in a playoff season (1999–2000)
- Only rookie defenceman to score a hat-trick in the playoffs, achieving the feat on May 7, 2000. Also the only Flyer defenceman to score a hat-trick in a playoff game.

== Career statistics ==
			Regular season					Playoffs
Season	Team	League	GP	G	A	Pts	PIM	GP	G	A	Pts	PIM
1992–93	Chatham MicMac	WOHL	47	4	21	25	38	—	—	—	—	—
1993–94	North Bay Centennials	OHL	45	2	7	9	33	17	0	0	0	2
1993–94	North Bay Centennials	MC	—	—	—	—	—	3	0	0	0	0
1994–95	North Bay Centennials	OHL	40	2	14	16	21	—	—	—	—	—
1994–95	Sarnia Sting	OHL	27	5	13	18	27	3	0	0	0	2
1995–96	Sarnia Sting	OHL	64	21	38	59	45	10	3	7	10	2
1996–97	Sarnia Sting	OHL	63	18	60	78	39	12	2	10	12	10
1996–97	Fredericton Canadiens	AHL	4	0	1	1	0	—	—	—	—	—
1997–98	Philadelphia Phantoms	AHL	73	9	30	39	46	18	4	4	8	21
1998–99	Philadelphia Flyers	NHL	2	0	1	1	0	—	—	—	—	—
1998–99	Philadelphia Phantoms	AHL	70	5	18	23	51	15	1	4	5	6
1999–00	Philadelphia Phantoms	AHL	39	12	14	26	31	—	—	—	—	—
1999–00	Philadelphia Flyers	NHL	27	2	5	7	8	18	5	2	7	14
2000–01	Philadelphia Flyers	NHL	66	5	9	14	16	2	1	0	1	2
2001–02	Nashville Predators	NHL	73	16	22	38	22	—	—	—	—	—
2002–03	Nashville Predators	NHL	71	18	16	34	28	—	—	—	—	—
2003–04	Buffalo Sabres	NHL	37	2	5	7	29	—	—	—	—	—
2003–04	Rochester Americans	AHL	8	0	2	2	2	—	—	—	—	—
2004–05	Adler Mannheim	DEL	50	7	16	23	59	14	1	6	7	12
2005–06	Columbus Blue Jackets	NHL	7	0	0	0	2	—	—	—	—	—
2005–06	Syracuse Crunch	AHL	66	17	55	72	46	6	0	1	1	19
2006–07	Springfield Falcons	AHL	47	12	12	24	22	—	—	—	—	—
2006–07	Chicago Wolves	AHL	28	5	11	16	10	15	0	6	6	2
2007–08	Hamburg Freezers	DEL	51	10	25	35	90	8	0	1	1	12
2008–09	Hamburg Freezers	DEL	52	9	22	31	70	9	1	3	4	8
2009–10	Grand Rapids Griffins	AHL	54	5	15	20	32	—	—	—	—	—
2009–10	Abbotsford Heat	AHL	9	1	3	4	4	5	0	3	3	0
2010–11	Lørenskog IK	GET	24	5	6	11	20	11	1	6	7	20
2011–12	KHL Medveščak Zagreb	EBEL	12	1	1	2	14	—	—	—	—	—
2011–12	Ritten-Renon	ITA	23	7	16	23	16	—	—	—	—	—
2012–13	Graz 99ers	EBEL	18	2	7	9	42	—	—	—	—	—
2012–13	Ritten-Renon	ITA	16	3	11	14	4	—	—	—	—	—
2012–13	HC Bolzano	ITA	4	1	0	1	2	6	2	4	6	2
NHL totals			283	43	58	101	105	20	6	2	8	16
