= Pat Stapleton Arena =

Arena in Sarina, Ontario

Coordinates: 42.96936°N 82.40329°W

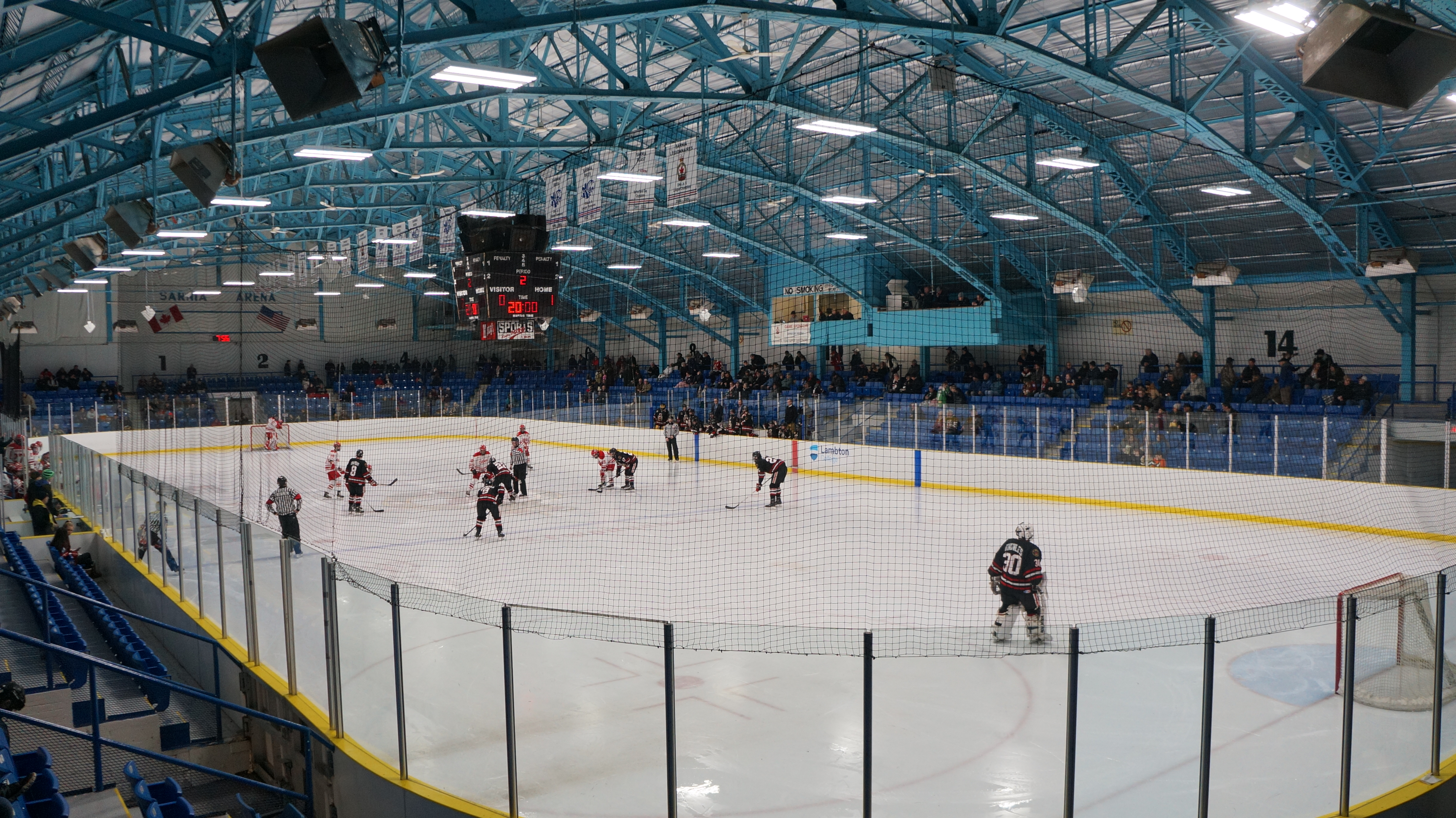
- Interactive map of Pat Stapleton Arena
- Location: 134 Brock Street South; Sarnia, Ontario; N7T 2W2
- Owner: City of Sarnia
- Operator: City of Sarnia
- Capacity: Ice hockey: 2,302

Construction
- Groundbreaking: 1948
- Opened: 1948

Tenants
- Sarnia Sting (OHL) (1994–1998); Sarnia Sailors (OHA) (1953–1954); Sarnia Legionnaires (WOHL) (1954–1968); Sarnia Legionnaires (SOJAHL) (1968–1970); Sarnia Bees (WOHL) (1969–1995); Sarnia Steeplejacks (WOHL) (1995–1999); Sarnia Steeplejack Bees (WOHL) (1999–2001); Sarnia Blast (WOHL) (2001–2008); Sarnia Legionnaires (WOHL) (2008–present)

The Pat Stapleton Arena is a 2,302 capacity arena in Sarnia, Ontario that is home to the Sarnia Legionnaires, one of the most successful teams in Canadian junior ice hockey history. Located at the corner of Wellington and Brock Streets, it is the largest arena owned by the city of Sarnia.

It was built in 1948 and is currently home to the Legionnaires of the Greater Ontario Junior Hockey League, as well as minor hockey teams and minor hockey tournaments.

The Legionnaires have won six championships and launched the careers of nine NHL players, including Hall of Famer Phil Esposito. Sarnia Mayor Mike Bradley credits the Legionnaires with keeping the Pat Stapleton Arena alive. In fact, because the team drew such huge crowds in the 2008–09 season, city council decided to put in new seating, higher glass and to repair the roof. There had been talk of tearing the building down, but that disappeared after the '09 Legionnaires drew more than 50,000 fans to their games. While used primarily for ice hockey, it is also used for skating lessons, public skating sessions, the circus, high school graduation ceremonies, and other special events. Until McMorran Place in Port Huron, Michigan was built in 1960, it was the Blue Water region's primary concert venue.

The Sarnia Sting of the Ontario Hockey League played at the arena briefly in the mid-1990s while the Progressive Auto Sales Arena (Formally the Sarnia Sports and Entertainment Centre) was under construction. The arena was not large enough to host the OHL team permanently, and the Sting were only allowed to move to Sarnia on the condition that a new arena be built.

In January 1957 the Chicago Blackhawks of the NHL played an exhibition game at the Sarnia Arena against the Legionnaires. The Hawks won, but the Sarnia Jr. 'B' team got six goals.

In 2021, the Sarnia Arena was renamed Pat Stapleton Arena after the late Pat Stapleton.
