= Jon Sim =

Canadian ice hockey player (born 1977)

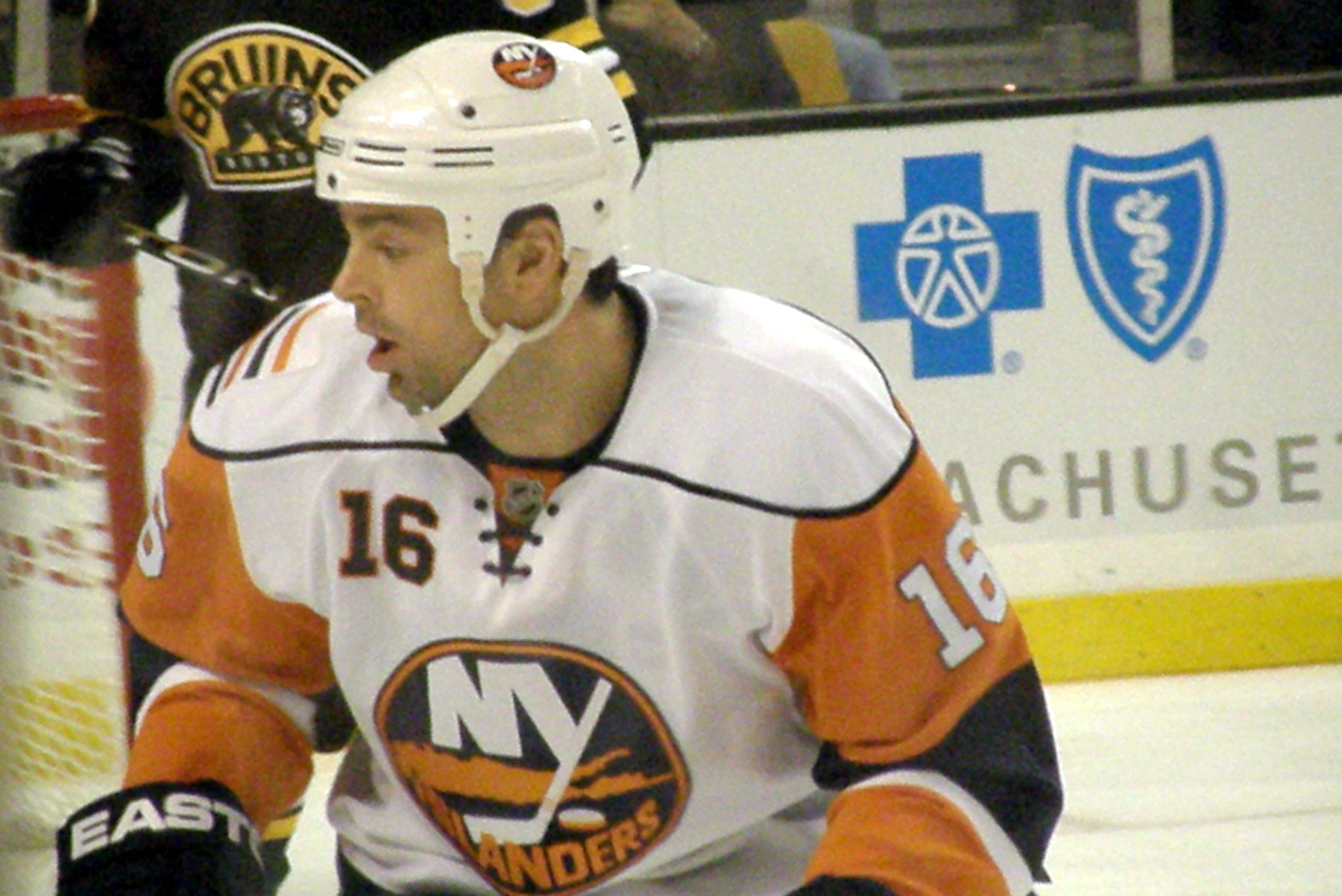
- Sim with the New York Islanders in 2008
- Born: September 29, 1977 (age 48) New Glasgow, Nova Scotia, Canada
- Height: 5 ft 10 in (178 cm)
- Weight: 192 lb (87 kg; 13 st 10 lb)
- Position: Left wing
- Shot: Left
- Played for: Dallas Stars; Nashville Predators; Los Angeles Kings; Pittsburgh Penguins; Philadelphia Flyers; Florida Panthers; Atlanta Thrashers; New York Islanders; HC Fribourg-Gottéron; HC Pardubice; HC Slavia Praha; Eisbären Berlin
- NHL draft: 70th overall, 1996; Dallas Stars
- Playing career: 1998–2014

Jonathan Sim (born September 29, 1977) is a Canadian former professional ice hockey left winger who played in the National Hockey League (NHL). He was drafted by the Dallas Stars in the third round (70th overall) of the 1996 NHL entry draft.

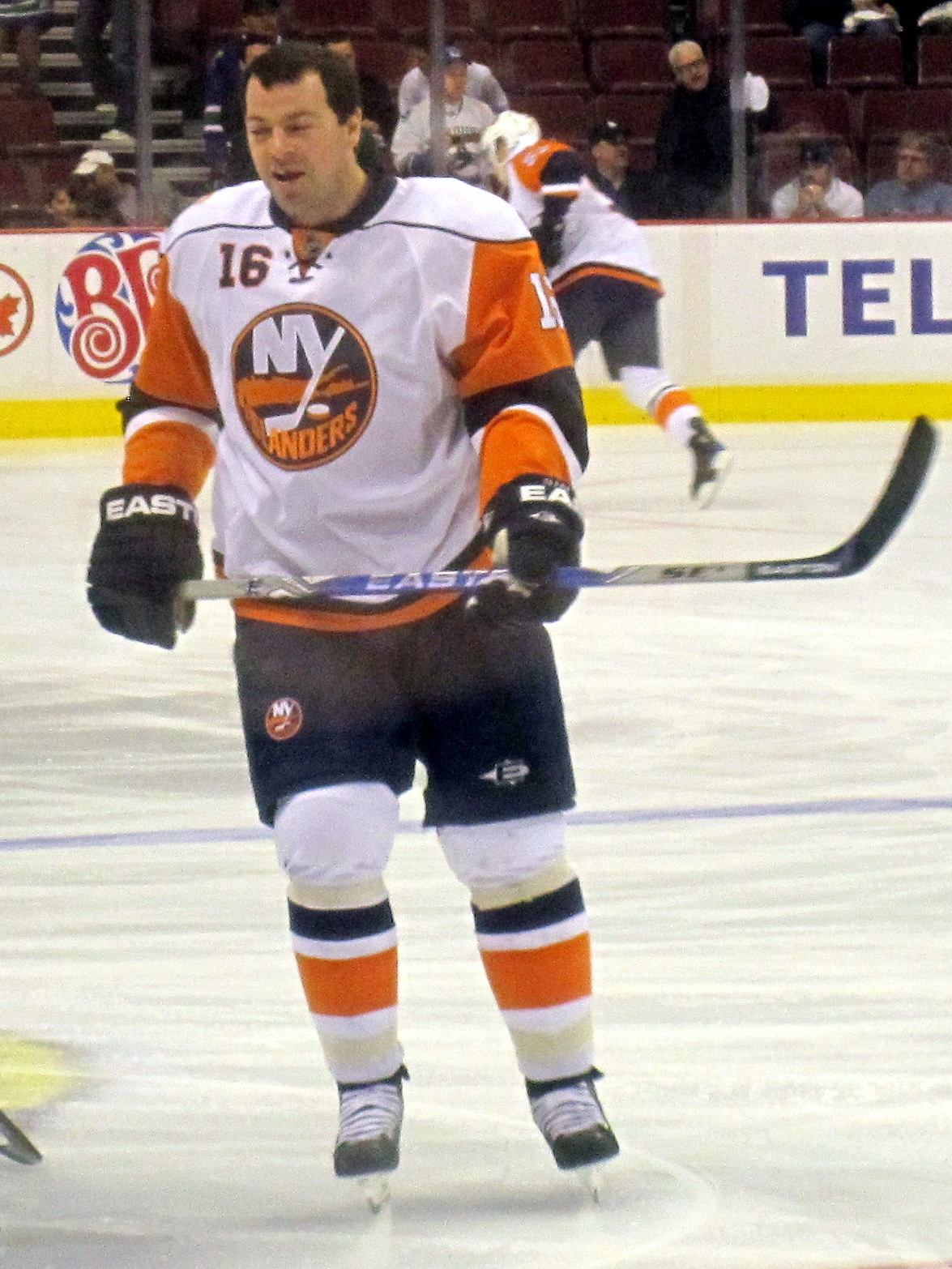
Jon Sim With the New York Islanders in 2010

== Playing career ==
As a veteran journeyman of the National Hockey League, Sim moved to play his first full professional season in Europe in 2011–12. After an unsuccessful stint in the Czech Extraliga, Sim was signed by Eisbären Berlin of the Deutsche Eishockey Liga, where he helped contribute to the team's 6th league championship.

On his return to North America and the 2012–13 NHL lockout negating his chance of an NHL contract, Sim was signed to a professional try-out deal with the San Antonio Rampage of the AHL on December 7, 2012. Over the course of his try-out, Sim contributed with 13 points in 22 games, before opting not to renew with the Rampage to be mutually released on January 28, 2013. On January 31, 2013, Sim was signed to a professional try-out deal with the Adirondack Phantoms of the AHL. On November 4, 2013, Sim signed a professional tryout with the Bridgeport Sound Tigers. He ended up playing 14 games with the Sound Tigers, scoring 2 goals and adding 2 assists.

== Personal life ==
Sim is the father of Toronto Marlies forward Landon Sim, Vernon Vipers forward Lane Sim, and Weeks Majors forward Ewan Sim

== Career statistics ==
| | | | Regular season | | | | | Playoffs |
| Season | Team | League | GP | G | A | Pts | PIM | GP | G | A | Pts | PIM |
|---|---|---|---|---|---|---|---|---|---|---|---|---|
| 1994–95 | Laval Titan Collège Français | QMJHL | 9 | 0 | 1 | 1 | 6 | — | — | — | — | — |
| 1994–95 | Sarnia Sting | OHL | 25 | 9 | 12 | 21 | 19 | 4 | 3 | 2 | 5 | 2 |
| 1995–96 | Sarnia Sting | OHL | 63 | 56 | 45 | 101 | 130 | 10 | 8 | 7 | 15 | 26 |
| 1996–97 | Sarnia Sting | OHL | 64 | 56 | 39 | 95 | 109 | 12 | 9 | 5 | 14 | 32 |
| 1997–98 | Sarnia Sting | OHL | 59 | 44 | 50 | 94 | 95 | 5 | 1 | 4 | 5 | 14 |
| 1998–99 | Dallas Stars | NHL | 7 | 1 | 0 | 1 | 12 | 4 | 0 | 0 | 0 | 0 |
| 1998–99 | Michigan K–Wings | IHL | 68 | 24 | 27 | 51 | 91 | 5 | 3 | 1 | 4 | 18 |
| 1999–2000 | Michigan K–Wings | IHL | 35 | 14 | 16 | 30 | 65 | — | — | — | — | — |
| 1999–2000 | Dallas Stars | NHL | 25 | 5 | 3 | 8 | 10 | 7 | 1 | 0 | 1 | 6 |
| 2000–01 | Utah Grizzlies | IHL | 39 | 16 | 13 | 29 | 44 | — | — | — | — | — |
| 2000–01 | Dallas Stars | NHL | 15 | 0 | 3 | 3 | 6 | — | — | — | — | — |
| 2001–02 | Utah Grizzlies | AHL | 31 | 21 | 6 | 27 | 63 | — | — | — | — | — |
| 2001–02 | Dallas Stars | NHL | 26 | 3 | 0 | 3 | 10 | — | — | — | — | — |
| 2002–03 | Utah Grizzlies | AHL | 42 | 16 | 31 | 47 | 85 | — | — | — | — | — |
| 2002–03 | Dallas Stars | NHL | 4 | 0 | 0 | 0 | 0 | — | — | — | — | — |
| 2002–03 | Nashville Predators | NHL | 4 | 1 | 0 | 1 | 0 | — | — | — | — | — |
| 2002–03 | Los Angeles Kings | NHL | 14 | 0 | 2 | 2 | 19 | — | — | — | — | — |
| 2003–04 | Los Angeles Kings | NHL | 48 | 6 | 7 | 13 | 27 | — | — | — | — | — |
| 2003–04 | Pittsburgh Penguins | NHL | 15 | 2 | 3 | 5 | 6 | — | — | — | — | — |
| 2004–05 | Utah Grizzlies | AHL | 10 | 2 | 2 | 4 | 12 | — | — | — | — | — |
| 2004–05 | Philadelphia Phantoms | AHL | 63 | 35 | 26 | 61 | 66 | 21 | 10 | 7 | 17 | 44 |
| 2005–06 | Philadelphia Flyers | NHL | 39 | 7 | 7 | 14 | 28 | — | — | — | — | — |
| 2005–06 | Florida Panthers | NHL | 33 | 10 | 8 | 18 | 26 | — | — | — | — | — |
| 2006–07 | Atlanta Thrashers | NHL | 77 | 17 | 12 | 29 | 60 | 4 | 0 | 0 | 0 | 0 |
| 2007–08 | New York Islanders | NHL | 2 | 0 | 1 | 1 | 2 | — | — | — | — | — |
| 2008–09 | New York Islanders | NHL | 49 | 9 | 6 | 15 | 42 | — | — | — | — | — |
| 2008–09 | Bridgeport Sound Tigers | AHL | 18 | 13 | 10 | 23 | 12 | 5 | 2 | 3 | 5 | 10 |
| 2009–10 | New York Islanders | NHL | 77 | 13 | 9 | 22 | 44 | — | — | — | — | — |
| 2010–11 | New York Islanders | NHL | 34 | 1 | 3 | 4 | 22 | — | — | — | — | — |
| 2010–11 | Bridgeport Sound Tigers | AHL | 8 | 7 | 2 | 9 | 6 | — | — | — | — | — |
| 2010–11 | HC Fribourg–Gottéron | NLA | 7 | 1 | 0 | 1 | 2 | 3 | 0 | 0 | 0 | 12 |
| 2011–12 | HC ČSOB Pojišťovna Pardubice | ELH | 20 | 2 | 4 | 6 | 22 | — | — | — | — | — |
| 2011–12 | HC Slavia Praha | ELH | 8 | 1 | 1 | 2 | 12 | — | — | — | — | — |
| 2011–12 | Eisbären Berlin | DEL | 14 | 2 | 4 | 6 | 27 | 13 | 0 | 0 | 0 | 33 |
| 2012–13 | San Antonio Rampage | AHL | 22 | 6 | 7 | 13 | 14 | — | — | — | — | — |
| 2012–13 | Adirondack Phantoms | AHL | 34 | 6 | 13 | 19 | 22 | — | — | — | — | — |
| 2013–14 | Bridgeport Sound Tigers | AHL | 14 | 2 | 2 | 4 | 4 | — | — | — | — | — |
| NHL totals | | | 469 | 75 | 64 | 139 | 314 | 15 | 1 | 0 | 1 | 6 |
| AHL totals | | | 242 | 108 | 99 | 207 | 284 | 26 | 12 | 10 | 22 | 54 |

== Awards and honours ==
| Award | Year |
|---|---|
OHL
| Second All-Star Team | 1998 |
AHL
| Calder Cup | 2005 |
NHL
| Stanley Cup | 1999 |
DEL
| DEL Champion | 2012 |
