= 1989–90 OHL season =

Junior ice hockey season

The 1989–90 OHL season was the tenth season of the Ontario Hockey League. The Toronto Marlboros become the Dukes of Hamilton. The Guelph Platers become the Owen Sound Platers. The Kingston Raiders are renamed the Kingston Frontenacs. The OHL Executive of the Year award is inaugurated. Fifteen teams each played 66 games. The Oshawa Generals won the J. Ross Robertson Cup, defeating the Kitchener Rangers.

== Relocation/Team Name Change ==
=== Guelph Platers to Owen Sound Platers ===
The Guelph Platers relocated to the city of Owen Sound during the off-season as the ownership group, the Holody family, could not get a new arena built.

The club kept the Platers named and would be known as the Owen Sound Platers. The team would play out of the Bayshore Community Centre. During their years in Guelph from 1982 to 1989, the Platers won the Memorial Cup in 1986. Owen Sound would continue to play out of the Emms Division.

=== Toronto Marlboros to Hamilton Dukes ===
The Toronto Marlboros relocated to the city of Hamilton and were renamed as the Dukes of Hamilton. The Marlboros had a long history in Toronto, playing from 1904 to 1989. The Marlboros won the Memorial Cup seven times, the most recent being in 1975.

The Dukes would play out of Copps Coliseum and remain in the Leyden Division.

=== Kingston Raiders to Kingston Frontenacs ===
The Kingston Raiders were rebranded as the Kingston Frontenacs as the club was sold a new ownership group, including Wren Blair, Don Anderson, and Bob Attersley, keeping the team in Kingston.

The club previously played as the Kingston Canadians from 1973 to 1988 before being renamed as the Raiders for the 1988-89 season. Kingston changed their colour scheme from black, silver and white to yellow, black and white.

=== Windsor Compuware Spitfires to Windsor Spitfires ===
The Windsor Compuware Spitfires were sold by Peter Karmanos to local construction magnate Steve Riolo during the off-season, and reverted to their original team name, the Windsor Spitfires.

The Spitfires introduced a new logo and colour scheme.

== Regular season ==
=== Final standings ===
Note: GP = Games played; W = Wins; L = Losses; T = Ties; GF = Goals for; GA = Goals against; PTS = Points; x = clinched playoff berth; y = clinched division title

=== Leyden Division ===
Rank	Team	GP	W	L	T	PTS	GF	GA
1	y-Oshawa Generals	66	42	20	4	88	334	244
2	x-Kingston Frontenacs	66	42	21	3	87	300	232
3	x-Peterborough Petes	66	37	23	6	80	294	236
4	x-Ottawa 67's	66	38	26	2	78	320	265
5	x-Belleville Bulls	66	36	26	4	76	301	247
6	x-Cornwall Royals	66	24	38	4	52	309	361
7	Hamilton Dukes	66	11	49	6	28	211	371

=== Emms Division ===
Rank	Team	GP	W	L	T	PTS	GF	GA
1	y-London Knights	66	41	19	6	88	313	246
2	x-Kitchener Rangers	66	38	21	7	83	358	259
3	x-Sudbury Wolves	66	36	23	7	79	295	267
4	x-Owen Sound Platers	66	28	31	7	63	265	305
5	x-North Bay Centennials	66	23	35	8	54	292	314
6	x-Niagara Falls Thunder	66	23	39	4	50	278	355
7	Sault Ste. Marie Greyhounds	66	18	42	6	42	229	289
8	Windsor Spitfires	66	17	41	8	42	233	341

=== Scoring leaders ===
Player	Team	GP	G	A	Pts	PIM
Keith Primeau	Niagara Falls Thunder	65	57	70	127	97
Paul DiPietro	Sudbury Wolves	66	56	63	119	57
Mike Ricci	Peterborough Petes	60	52	64	116	39
Owen Nolan	Cornwall Royals	58	51	60	111	240
Darcy Cahill	Cornwall Royals//Sudbury Wolves	58	38	71	109	73
Brett Seguin	Ottawa 67's	63	28	80	108	30
Gilbert Dionne	Kitchener Rangers	64	48	57	105	85
Chris Taylor	London Knights	66	45	60	105	60
Iain Fraser	Oshawa Generals	56	40	65	105	75
Joey St. Aubin	Kitchener Rangers	66	36	68	104	102

== Playoffs ==
Division quarterfinals
L1	Oshawa	4
L6	Cornwall	2
L3	Peterborough	4
L4	Ottawa	0
L2	Kingston	3
L5	Belleville	4
E2	Kitchener	4
E5	North Bay	1
E3	Sudbury	3
E4	Owen Sound	4
E1	London	2
E6	Niagara Falls	4

Quarterfinals
L1	Oshawa	bye
L3	Peterborough	4
L5	Belleville	0
E2	Kitchener	bye
E4	Owen Sound	1
E6	Niagara Falls	4

Semifinals
L1	Oshawa	4
L3	Peterborough	0
E2	Kitchener	4
E6	Niagara Falls	1

Finals
L1	Oshawa	4
E2	Kitchener	3

=== Division quarter-finals ===
==== Leyden Division ====
===== (1) Oshawa Generals vs. (6) Cornwall Royals =====
March 18	Cornwall Royals	6 – 7	Oshawa Generals	Oshawa Civic Auditorium

March 20	Oshawa Generals	4 – 6	Cornwall Royals	Cornwall Civic Complex

March 22	Cornwall Royals	1 – 10	Oshawa Generals	Oshawa Civic Auditorium

March 23	Oshawa Generals	5 – 8	Cornwall Royals	Cornwall Civic Complex

March 25	Cornwall Royals	4 – 6	Oshawa Generals	Oshawa Civic Auditorium

March 27	Oshawa Generals	7 – 2	Cornwall Royals	Cornwall Civic Complex

Oshawa wins series 4 – 2

===== (2) Kingston Frontenacs vs. (5) Belleville Bulls =====
March 18	Belleville Bulls	3 – 6	Kingston Frontenacs	Kingston Memorial Centre

March 20	Kingston Frontenacs	3 – 4	4OT	Belleville Bulls	Yardmen Arena

March 22	Belleville Bulls	2 – 4	Kingston Frontenacs	Kingston Memorial Centre

March 24	Kingston Frontenacs	0 – 7	Belleville Bulls	Yardmen Arena

March 25	Belleville Bulls	4 – 7	Kingston Frontenacs	Kingston Memorial Centre

March 27	Kingston Frontenacs	3 – 4	Belleville Bulls	Yardmen Arena

March 28	Belleville Bulls	3 – 2	Kingston Frontenacs	Kingston Memorial Centre

Belleville wins series 4 – 3

===== (3) Peterborough Petes vs. (4) Ottawa 67's =====
March 19	Ottawa 67's	0 – 4	Peterborough Petes	Peterborough Memorial Centre

March 20	Peterborough Petes	5 – 3	Ottawa 67's	Ottawa Civic Centre

March 22	Ottawa 67's	2 – 3	OT	Peterborough Petes	Peterborough Memorial Centre

March 23	Peterborough Petes	3 – 2	OT	Ottawa 67's	Ottawa Civic Centre

Peterborough wins series 4 – 0

==== Emms Division ====
===== (1) London Knights vs. (6) Niagara Falls Thunder =====
March 18	Niagara Falls Thunder	7 – 6	London Knights	London Gardens

March 19	London Knights	1 – 5	Niagara Falls Thunder	Niagara Falls Memorial Arena

March 21	Niagara Falls Thunder	2 – 6	London Knights	London Gardens

March 22	London Knights	5 – 3	Niagara Falls Thunder	Niagara Falls Memorial Arena

March 25	Niagara Falls Thunder	3 – 2	OT	London Knights	London Gardens

March 27	London Knights	2 – 6	Niagara Falls Thunder	Niagara Falls Memorial Arena

Niagara Falls wins series 4 – 2

===== (2) Kitchener Rangers vs. (5) North Bay Centennials =====
March 18	North Bay Centennials	1 – 8	Kitchener Rangers	Kitchener Memorial Auditorium

March 20	Kitchener Rangers	8 – 4	North Bay Centennials	North Bay Memorial Gardens

March 22	North Bay Centennials	3 – 6	Kitchener Rangers	Kitchener Memorial Auditorium

March 23	Kitchener Rangers	4 – 5	North Bay Centennials	North Bay Memorial Gardens

March 25	North Bay Centennials	4 – 11	Kitchener Rangers	Kitchener Memorial Auditorium

Kitchener wins series 4 – 1

===== (3) Sudbury Wolves vs. (4) Owen Sound Platers =====
March 18	Owen Sound Platers	8 – 7	Sudbury Wolves	Sudbury Community Arena

March 20	Sudbury Wolves	3 – 2	Owen Sound Platers	Bayshore Community Centre

March 22	Owen Sound Platers	2 – 4	Sudbury Wolves	Sudbury Community Arena

March 24	Sudbury Wolves	5 – 4	OT	Owen Sound Platers	Bayshore Community Centre

March 26	Owen Sound Platers	5 – 1	Sudbury Wolves	Sudbury Community Arena

March 27	Sudbury Wolves	2 – 3	Owen Sound Platers	Bayshore Community Centre

March 28	Owen Sound Platers	4 – 3	OT	Sudbury Wolves	Sudbury Community Arena

Owen Sound wins series 4 – 3

=== Division semi-finals ===
==== Leyden Division ====
===== (3) Peterborough Petes vs. (5) Belleville Bulls =====
March 29	Belleville Bulls	1 – 4	Peterborough Petes	Peterborough Memorial Centre

March 30	Peterborough Petes	5 – 3	Belleville Bulls	Yardmen Arena

March 31	Peterborough Petes	3 – 2	Belleville Bulls	Yardmen Arena

April 1	Belleville Bulls	0 – 8	Peterborough Petes	Peterborough Memorial Centre

Peterborough wins series 4 – 0

==== Emms Division ====
===== (4) Owen Sound Platers vs. (6) Niagara Falls Thunder =====
March 31	Niagara Falls Thunder	3 – 7	Owen Sound Platers	Bayshore Community Centre

April 1	Owen Sound Platers	2 – 11	Niagara Falls Thunder	Niagara Falls Memorial Arena

April 3	Niagara Falls Thunder	3 – 2	Owen Sound Platers	Bayshore Community Centre

April 5	Owen Sound Platers	3 – 4	Niagara Falls Thunder	Niagara Falls Memorial Arena

April 7	Niagara Falls Thunder	7 – 4	Owen Sound Platers	Bayshore Community Centre

Niagara Falls wins series 4 – 1

=== Division finals ===
==== Leyden Division ====
===== (1) Oshawa Generals vs. (3) Peterborough Petes =====
April 10	Peterborough Petes	1 – 5	Oshawa Generals	Oshawa Civic Auditorium

April 12	Oshawa Generals	4 – 2	Peterborough Petes	Peterborough Memorial Centre

April 13	Peterborough Petes	2 – 4	Oshawa Generals	Oshawa Civic Auditorium

April 15	Oshawa Generals	5 – 2	Peterborough Petes	Peterborough Memorial Centre

Oshawa wins series 4 – 0

==== Emms Division ====
===== (2) Kitchener Rangers vs. (6) Niagara Falls Thunder =====
April 10	Niagara Falls Thunder	2 – 5	Kitchener Rangers	Kitchener Memorial Auditorium

April 12	Kitchener Rangers	5 – 1	Niagara Falls Thunder	Niagara Falls Memorial Arena

April 13	Niagara Falls Thunder	6 – 5	Kitchener Rangers	Kitchener Memorial Auditorium

April 15	Kitchener Rangers	5 – 3	Niagara Falls Thunder	Niagara Falls Memorial Arena

April 17	Niagara Falls Thunder	5 – 10	Kitchener Rangers	Kitchener Memorial Auditorium

Kitchener wins series 4 – 1

=== J. Ross Robertson Cup ===
==== (L1) Oshawa Generals vs. (E2) Kitchener Rangers ====
April 19	Kitchener Rangers	1 – 5	Oshawa Generals	Oshawa Civic Auditorium

April 20	Oshawa Generals	2 – 5	Kitchener Rangers	Kitchener Memorial Auditorium

April 22	Kitchener Rangers	2 – 1	Oshawa Generals	Oshawa Civic Auditorium

April 24	Oshawa Generals	2 – 3	Kitchener Rangers	Kitchener Memorial Auditorium

April 25	Kitchener Rangers	4 – 6	Oshawa Generals	Oshawa Civic Auditorium

April 27	Oshawa Generals	6 – 2	Kitchener Rangers	Kitchener Memorial Auditorium

May 1	Kitchener Rangers	2 – 4	Oshawa Generals	Oshawa Civic Auditorium

Oshawa wins series 4 – 3

== Awards ==
J. Ross Robertson Cup:	Oshawa Generals
Hamilton Spectator Trophy:	Oshawa Generals
Leyden Trophy:	Oshawa Generals
Emms Trophy:	London Knights
Red Tilson Trophy:	Mike Ricci, Peterborough Petes
Eddie Powers Memorial Trophy:	Keith Primeau, Niagara Falls Thunder
Matt Leyden Trophy:	Larry Mavety, Kingston Frontenacs
Jim Mahon Memorial Trophy:	Owen Nolan, Cornwall Royals
Max Kaminsky Trophy:	John Slaney, Cornwall Royals
OHL Goaltender of the Year:	Jeff Fife, Belleville Bulls
Jack Ferguson Award:	Pat Peake, Detroit Compuware Ambassadors
Dave Pinkney Trophy:	Jeff Wilson and Sean Gauthier, Kingston Frontenacs
OHL Executive of the Year:	Sam McMaster, Sudbury Wolves
Bill Long Award:	Sherwood Bassin, Oshawa Generals / Sault Ste. Marie Greyhounds
Emms Family Award:	Chris Longo, Peterborough Petes
F.W. 'Dinty' Moore Trophy:	Sean Basilio, London Knights
William Hanley Trophy:	Mike Ricci, Peterborough Petes
Leo Lalonde Memorial Trophy:	Iain Fraser, Oshawa Generals
Bobby Smith Trophy:	Ryan Kuwabara, Ottawa 67's

== 1990 OHL Priority Selection ==
The Detroit Compuware Ambassadors held the first overall pick in the 1990 Ontario Priority Selection and selected Pat Peake from the Detroit Compuware Ambassadors. Peake was awarded the Jack Ferguson Award, awarded to the top pick in the draft.

Below are the players who were selected in the first round of the 1990 Ontario Hockey League Priority Selection.

#	Player	Nationality	OHL Team	Hometown	Minor Team
1	Pat Peake (C)	United States	Detroit Compuware Ambassadors	Madison Heights, Michigan	Detroit Compuware Ambassadors
2	Jeff Bes (C)	Canada	Hamilton Dukes	London, Ontario	St. Mary's Lincolns
3	Todd Warriner (LW)	Canada	Windsor Spitfires	Blenheim, Ontario	Chatham MicMacs
4	Jarret Reid (C)	Canada	Sault Ste. Marie Greyhounds	Sault Ste. Marie, Ontario	Sault Ste. Marie Legion
5	Steve Staios (D)	Canada	Niagara Falls Thunder	Hamilton, Ontario	Hamilton Kilty B's
6	Jeremy Stevenson (LW)	Canada	Cornwall Royals	Elliot Lake, Ontario	Elliot Lake Midgets
7	Jason MacDonald (RW)	Canada	North Bay Centennials	Charlottetown, PEI	Charlottetown Abbies
8	Geordie Maynard (LW)	Canada	Owen Sound Platers	Trenton, Ontario	Lindsay Bears
9	Chris Varga (LW)	Canada	Belleville Bulls	Kitchener, Ontario	Kitchener Rangers Midgets
10	Grant Marshall (D)	Canada	Ottawa 67's	Mississauga, Ontario	Toronto Young Nationals
11	Michael Peca (C)	Canada	Sudbury Wolves	Mississauga, Ontario	Toronto Red Wings
12	Ryan Black (LW)	Canada	Peterborough Petes	Elmira, Ontario	Waterloo Siskins
13	Shayne McCosh (D)	Canada	Kitchener Rangers	Oshawa, Ontario	Oshawa Midgets
14	Keli Corpse (C)	Canada	Kingston Frontenacs	London, Ontario	London Diamonds
15	Mark Visheau (D)	Canada	London Knights	Burlington, Ontario	Burlington Cougars
16	Mike Cote (RW)	Canada	Oshawa Generals	Oshawa, Ontario	Oshawa Midgets

== See also ==
- List of OHA Junior A standings
- List of OHL seasons
- 1990 Memorial Cup
- 1990 NHL entry draft
- 1989 in sports
- 1990 in sports

Preceded by 1988–89 OHL season	OHL seasons	Succeeded by 1990–91 OHL season
