= Keith Primeau =

Canadian ice hockey player (born 1971)

- Born: November 24, 1971 (age 54) Toronto, Ontario, Canada
- Height: 6 ft 5 in (196 cm)
- Weight: 220 lb (100 kg; 15 st 10 lb)
- Position: Centre
- Shot: Left
- Played for: Detroit Red Wings; Hartford Whalers; Carolina Hurricanes; Philadelphia Flyers
- National team: Canada
- NHL draft: 3rd overall, 1990; Detroit Red Wings
- Playing career: 1990–2005
Medal record
Representing Canada
World Championships
| Gold medal – first place | 1997 Finland |

Keith David Primeau (born November 24, 1971) is a Canadian former professional ice hockey centre who played 15 seasons in the National Hockey League (NHL) with the Detroit Red Wings, Hartford Whalers, Carolina Hurricanes and Philadelphia Flyers.

He was recently the special assistant to the general manager and director of player development of the Las Vegas Wranglers of the ECHL, now currently an assistant hockey coach at Bishop Eustace Preparatory School, the coach of Revolution in the Revolution Ice gardens, and the owner of a franchise of Bain's Deli in Philadelphia. He is the older brother of Wayne Primeau.

== Playing career ==
Primeau was drafted third overall in the 1990 NHL entry draft by the Detroit Red Wings after playing two years with the Niagara Falls Thunder of the Ontario Hockey League (OHL). He split his first two professional seasons with Detroit and their then-American Hockey League (AHL) affiliate, the Adirondack Red Wings. He set career highs in assists (42), points (73) and plus/minus (+34) in 1993–94. He made his only Stanley Cup Final appearance while with the Red Wings in 1995, losing in a sweep to the New Jersey Devils. Primeau held out after the club signed Igor Larionov and after playing for Canada in the 1996 World Cup of Hockey, Detroit traded him (along with Paul Coffey and a 1997 first-round draft pick, ultimately used to select Nikos Tselios) to the Hartford Whalers in exchange for Brendan Shanahan and Brian Glynn a few days following the start of the 1996–97 season.

Primeau became a leader with his new team when the franchise moved to North Carolina and became the Carolina Hurricanes, being named team captain in 1998–99. However, he missed the majority of the 1999–2000 NHL season after holding out and was traded to the Philadelphia Flyers (along with a 2000 fifth-round draft pick, ultimately used to select Kristofer Ottosson) in exchange for Rod Brind'Amour, Jean-Marc Pelletier and a 2000 second-round draft pick (Agris Saviels) on January 23, 2000.

With the Flyers for the remainder of the 1999-2000 regular season, Primeau became a replacement for Eric Lindros, who only played a few more playoff games in 2000 and ending up holding out the entire 2000-01 season. On May 5, 2000, Primeau scored the game-winning goal in the longest game in modern NHL playoff history (five overtime periods for a total of 152 minutes and one second) against Ron Tugnutt of the Pittsburgh Penguins in Game 4 of the Eastern Conference Semifinals. Only two games, in 1933 and 1936, were longer.

In the 2000-01 season, his first full year with the Flyers, Primeau led the team in goals (34) and tied his career-high in points (73). Early in the following season, he was named team captain after defenceman Éric Desjardins resigned from the position. After posting nearly identical seasons statistically in 2001–02 and 2002–03, Primeau was given the task of centering a more defense-oriented line in 2003–04. He did well enough in his new role to earn a surprise selection to the 2004 NHL All-Star Game, the second of his career.

In the 2004 Stanley Cup playoffs, Primeau recorded nine goals and seven assists for a total of 16 points; it was the best playoff year of Primeau's career and his play carried the team to within a game of the Stanley Cup finals. In Game 6 of the Eastern Conference finals, against the Tampa Bay Lightning, Primeau scored the game-tying goal with 1:49 left in regulation. The Flyers won the game, 5–4 in overtime, sending the series back to Tampa for Game 7. The Flyers went on to lose that game by a score of 2–1. Hockey legend Phil Esposito later told Primeau that, "During the '04 playoffs, when you and the Flyers took the Lightning to seven games, you were the most dominating player I ever saw. More than Orr, Howe, Gretzky, or anyone."

Nine games into the 2005–06 season, Primeau suffered a concussion which ended his season. As a result of ongoing post-concussion syndrome, he officially announced his retirement on September 14, 2006. On February 12, 2007, the Flyers honoured Primeau before a game against the Detroit Red Wings, the team which originally drafted him. An emotional Primeau thanked the fans for welcoming him back.

Primeau has been a resident of Voorhees Township, New Jersey.

== Personal life ==
Primeau, along with his brother, Wayne, and Las Vegas Wranglers general manager Ryan Mougenel, own and operate the Durham Hockey Institute. The three of them are also part-owners of the Whitby Fury, a team in the Ontario Junior Hockey League (OJHL). Keith's son Cayden played his college hockey at Northeastern University, before signing his entry-level contract with the Montreal Canadiens after his sophomore season. Cayden was a 7th round draft pick of the Montreal Canadiens in the 2017 NHL entry draft and started 5 games for the silver medal winning United States men's national junior ice hockey team in the 2019 World Junior Ice Hockey Championships.

Primeau and his wife Lisa reside in Voorhees, New Jersey with their four children, where they have resided since his January 2000 trade to the Philadelphia Flyers. The family previously resided in Farmington Hills, Michigan earlier in his career.

== Awards ==
- 1989–90: Second All-Star Team OHL
- 1989–90: OHL Most Goals (57)
- 1989–90: Eddie Powers Memorial Trophy Leading Scorer OHL
- 1991–92: Calder Cup Champion
- 1998–99: Played in All-Star Game NHL
- 2000–01: Yanick Dupre Memorial (Philadelphia Flyers)
- 2002–03: Toyota Cup (Philadelphia Flyers)
- 2003–04: Played in the 2004 NHL All-Star Game

== Records ==
- May 5, 2000: Ended longest game in modern NHL playoff history with his goal at 92:01 of overtime.

== Career statistics ==
=== Regular season and playoffs ===
| | | | Regular season | | | | | Playoffs |
| Season | Team | League | GP | G | A | Pts | PIM | GP | G | A | Pts | PIM |
|---|---|---|---|---|---|---|---|---|---|---|---|---|
| 1987–88 | Hamilton Kilty B's | GHJHL | 19 | 19 | 17 | 36 | 16 | — | — | — | — | — |
| 1987–88 | Hamilton Steelhawks | OHL | 47 | 6 | 6 | 12 | 69 | 11 | 0 | 2 | 2 | 2 |
| 1988–89 | Niagara Falls Thunder | OHL | 48 | 20 | 35 | 55 | 56 | 17 | 9 | 6 | 15 | 12 |
| 1989–90 | Niagara Falls Thunder | OHL | 65 | 57 | 70 | 127 | 97 | 16 | 16 | 17 | 33 | 49 |
| 1990–91 | Detroit Red Wings | NHL | 58 | 3 | 12 | 15 | 106 | 5 | 1 | 1 | 2 | 25 |
| 1990–91 | Adirondack Red Wings | AHL | 6 | 3 | 5 | 8 | 8 | — | — | — | — | — |
| 1991–92 | Detroit Red Wings | NHL | 35 | 6 | 10 | 16 | 83 | 11 | 0 | 0 | 0 | 14 |
| 1991–92 | Adirondack Red Wings | AHL | 42 | 21 | 24 | 45 | 89 | 9 | 1 | 7 | 8 | 27 |
| 1992–93 | Detroit Red Wings | NHL | 73 | 15 | 17 | 32 | 152 | 7 | 0 | 2 | 2 | 26 |
| 1993–94 | Detroit Red Wings | NHL | 78 | 31 | 42 | 73 | 173 | 7 | 0 | 2 | 2 | 6 |
| 1994–95 | Detroit Red Wings | NHL | 45 | 15 | 27 | 42 | 99 | 17 | 4 | 5 | 9 | 45 |
| 1995–96 | Detroit Red Wings | NHL | 74 | 27 | 25 | 52 | 168 | 17 | 1 | 4 | 5 | 28 |
| 1996–97 | Hartford Whalers | NHL | 75 | 26 | 25 | 51 | 161 | — | — | — | — | — |
| 1997–98 | Carolina Hurricanes | NHL | 81 | 26 | 37 | 63 | 110 | — | — | — | — | — |
| 1998–99 | Carolina Hurricanes | NHL | 78 | 30 | 32 | 62 | 75 | 6 | 0 | 3 | 3 | 6 |
| 1999–2000 | Philadelphia Flyers | NHL | 23 | 7 | 10 | 17 | 31 | 18 | 2 | 11 | 13 | 13 |
| 2000–01 | Philadelphia Flyers | NHL | 71 | 34 | 39 | 73 | 76 | 4 | 0 | 3 | 3 | 6 |
| 2001–02 | Philadelphia Flyers | NHL | 75 | 19 | 29 | 48 | 128 | 5 | 0 | 0 | 0 | 6 |
| 2002–03 | Philadelphia Flyers | NHL | 80 | 19 | 27 | 46 | 93 | 13 | 1 | 1 | 2 | 14 |
| 2003–04 | Philadelphia Flyers | NHL | 54 | 7 | 15 | 22 | 80 | 18 | 9 | 7 | 16 | 22 |
| 2005–06 | Philadelphia Flyers | NHL | 9 | 1 | 6 | 7 | 6 | — | — | — | — | — |
| NHL totals | | | 909 | 266 | 353 | 619 | 1,541 | 128 | 18 | 39 | 57 | 213 |

=== International ===
| Year | Team | Event | Result | GP | G | A | Pts | PIM |
|---|---|---|---|---|---|---|---|---|
| 1996 | Canada | WCH | 2nd | 5 | 0 | 0 | 0 | 21 |
| 1997 | Canada | WC | 1st place, gold medalist(s) | 11 | 3 | 3 | 6 | 14 |
| 1998 | Canada | OG | 4th | 6 | 2 | 1 | 3 | 4 |
| 1998 | Canada | WC | 6th | 6 | 3 | 1 | 4 | 4 |
| Senior int'l totals | | | | 28 | 8 | 5 | 13 | 43 |

=== All-Star Games ===
| Year | Location | G | A | Pts |
|---|---|---|---|---|
| 1999 | Tampa Bay | 0 | 0 | 0 |
| 2004 | Minnesota | 0 | 0 | 0 |
| All-Star totals | | 0 | 0 | 0 |

Sporting positions
| Preceded by Mike Sillinger | Detroit Red Wings first-round draft pick 1990 | Succeeded by Martin Lapointe |
| Preceded by Kevin Dineen | Carolina Hurricanes captain 1998–99 | Succeeded by Ron Francis |
| Preceded by Eric Desjardins | Philadelphia Flyers captain 2001–06; Derian Hatcher, 2006 | Succeeded by Peter Forsberg |
