= 1990–91 OHL season =

Junior ice hockey season

The 1990–91 OHL season was the 11th season of the Ontario Hockey League. Sixteen teams each played 66 games. The Sault Ste. Marie Greyhounds won the J. Ross Robertson Cup, defeating the Oshawa Generals. The Detroit Compuware Ambassadors are granted a franchise.

== Expansion/Realignment ==
=== Detroit Compuware Ambassadors ===
On December 11, 1989, the Detroit Compuware Ambassadors were approved to join the league for the 1990–91 season as an expansion team. The club was owned by former Windsor Compuware Spitfires owner Peter Karmanos. The club was the first American based team in the OHL, and would play in the city of Detroit. The Compuware Ambassadors home was Cobo Arena, which was previously the home of the Detroit Pistons of the NBA from 1960 to 1978, and the Michigan Stags, who played in the World Hockey Association during the 1974-75 season.

The new club would join the Emms Division.

=== Realignment ===
As the expansion Detroit Compuware Ambassadors joined the Emms Division, the league also moved the Hamilton Dukes to the Emms Division. The Sudbury Wolves and North Bay Centennials would realign to the Leyden Division, as each division would have eight teams.

== Regular season ==
=== Final standings ===
Note: GP = Games played; W = Wins; L = Losses; T = Ties; GF = Goals for; GA = Goals against; PTS = Points; x = clinched playoff berth; y = clinched division title

=== Leyden Division ===
Rank	Team	GP	W	L	T	PTS	GF	GA
1	y-Oshawa Generals	66	47	13	6	100	382	233
2	x-North Bay Centennials	66	40	23	3	83	322	247
3	x-Belleville Bulls	66	38	21	7	83	324	280
4	x-Ottawa 67's	66	39	25	2	80	301	280
5	x-Peterborough Petes	66	33	26	7	73	272	254
6	x-Sudbury Wolves	66	33	28	5	71	288	265
7	Cornwall Royals	66	23	42	1	47	281	335
8	Kingston Frontenacs	66	15	47	4	34	255	382

=== Emms Division ===
Rank	Team	GP	W	L	T	PTS	GF	GA
1	y-Sault Ste. Marie Greyhounds	66	42	21	3	87	303	217
2	x-Niagara Falls Thunder	66	39	18	9	87	335	259
3	x-London Knights	66	38	25	3	79	301	270
4	x-Windsor Spitfires	66	33	29	4	70	307	279
5	x-Kitchener Rangers	66	28	30	8	64	301	293
6	x-Hamilton Dukes	66	17	43	6	40	270	379
7	Owen Sound Platers	66	13	48	5	31	269	373
8	Detroit Compuware Ambassadors	66	11	50	5	27	213	378

=== Scoring leaders ===
Player	Team	GP	G	A	Pts	PIM
Eric Lindros	Oshawa Generals	57	71	78	149	189
Chris Taylor	London Knights	65	50	78	128	50
Todd Simon	Niagara Falls Thunder	65	51	74	125	35
Jason Winch	Niagara Falls Thunder	66	40	82	122	16
Rob Pearson	Belleville Bulls//Oshawa Generals	51	63	55	118	103
Jason Firth	Kitchener Rangers	62	41	71	112	27
Joey St. Aubin	Kitchener Rangers	63	40	71	111	90
Brett Seguin	Ottawa 67's	63	24	87	111	85
Jason Cirone	Cornwall Royals//Windsor Spitfires	63	58	52	110	97
Jarrod Skalde	Oshawa Generals//Belleville Bulls	55	38	66	104	35

== Playoffs ==
Division quarterfinals
L1	Oshawa	4
L6	Sudbury	1
L3	Belleville	2
L4	Ottawa	4
L2	North Bay	4
L5	Peterborough	0
E2	Niagara Falls	4
E5	Kitchener	2
E3	London	3
E4	Windsor	4
E1	S.S. Marie	4
E6	Hamilton	0

Quarterfinals
L1	Oshawa	bye
L4	Ottawa	4
L2	North Bay	2
E2	Niagara Falls	4
E4	Windsor	0
E1	S.S. Marie	bye

Semifinals
L1	Oshawa	4
L4	Ottawa	1
E2	Niagara Falls	0
E1	S.S. Marie	4

Finals
L1	Oshawa	2
E1	S.S. Marie	4

=== Division quarter-finals ===
==== Leyden Division ====
===== (1) Oshawa Generals vs. (6) Sudbury Wolves =====
March 17	Sudbury Wolves	2 – 4	Oshawa Generals	Oshawa Civic Auditorium

March 20	Oshawa Generals	5 – 3	Sudbury Wolves	Sudbury Community Arena

March 22	Sudbury Wolves	8 – 2	Oshawa Generals	Oshawa Civic Auditorium

March 24	Oshawa Generals	7 – 6	Sudbury Wolves	Sudbury Community Arena

March 26	Sudbury Wolves	4 – 6	Oshawa Generals	Oshawa Civic Auditorium

Oshawa wins series 4 – 1

===== (2) North Bay Centennials vs. (5) Peterborough Petes =====
March 17	Peterborough Petes	2 – 5	North Bay Centennials	North Bay Memorial Gardens

March 19	North Bay Centennials	5 – 4	OT	Peterborough Petes	Peterborough Memorial Centre

March 21	North Bay Centennials	5 – 4	OT	Peterborough Petes	Peterborough Memorial Centre

March 22	Peterborough Petes	2 – 5	North Bay Centennials	North Bay Memorial Gardens

North Bay wins series 4 – 0

===== (3) Belleville Bulls vs. (4) Ottawa 67's =====
March 16	Ottawa 67's	2 – 7	Belleville Bulls	Yardmen Arena

March 19	Belleville Bulls	5 – 4	Ottawa 67's	Ottawa Civic Centre

March 20	Ottawa 67's	8 – 5	Belleville Bulls	Yardmen Arena

March 22	Belleville Bulls	4 – 5	Ottawa 67's	Ottawa Civic Centre

March 24	Ottawa 67's	6 – 5	Belleville Bulls	Yardmen Arena

March 26	Belleville Bulls	4 – 6	Ottawa 67's	Ottawa Civic Centre

Ottawa wins series 4 – 2

==== Emms Division ====
===== (1) Sault Ste. Marie Greyhounds vs. (6) Hamilton Dukes =====
March 17	Hamilton Dukes	3 – 8	Sault Ste. Marie Greyhounds	Sault Memorial Gardens

March 19	Hamilton Dukes	1 – 14	Sault Ste. Marie Greyhounds	Sault Memorial Gardens

March 21	Sault Ste. Marie Greyhounds	4 – 3	OT	Hamilton Dukes	Copps Coliseum

March 23	Sault Ste. Marie Greyhounds	3 – 2	Hamilton Dukes	Copps Coliseum

Sault Ste. Marie wins series 4 – 0

===== (2) Niagara Falls Thunder vs. (5) Kitchener Rangers =====
March 16	Kitchener Rangers	4 – 5	OT	Niagara Falls Thunder	Niagara Falls Memorial Arena

March 17	Niagara Falls Thunder	6 – 7	OT	Kitchener Rangers	Kitchener Memorial Auditorium

March 19	Kitchener Rangers	1 – 5	Niagara Falls Thunder	Niagara Falls Memorial Arena

March 22	Niagara Falls Thunder	7 – 4	Kitchener Rangers	Kitchener Memorial Auditorium

March 23	Kitchener Rangers	4 – 3	Niagara Falls Thunder	Niagara Falls Memorial Arena

March 26	Niagara Falls Thunder	5 – 2	Kitchener Rangers	Kitchener Memorial Auditorium

Niagara Falls wins series 4 – 2

===== (3) London Knights vs. (4) Windsor Spitfires =====
March 17	Windsor Spitfires	5 – 4	OT	London Knights	London Gardens

March 21	London Knights	6 – 2	Windsor Spitfires	Windsor Arena

March 22	Windsor Spitfires	3 – 2	OT	London Knights	London Gardens

March 24	London Knights	2 – 5	Windsor Spitfires	Windsor Arena

March 25	Windsor Spitfires	6 – 7	London Knights	London Gardens

March 27	London Knights	3 – 2	Windsor Spitfires	Windsor Arena

March 28	Windsor Spitfires	5 – 2	London Knights	London Gardens

Windsor wins series 4 – 3

=== Division semi-finals ===
==== Leyden Division ====
===== (2) North Bay Centennials vs. (4) Ottawa 67's =====
March 29	Ottawa 67's	3 – 4	North Bay Centennials	North Bay Memorial Gardens

April 2	North Bay Centennials	2 – 4	Ottawa 67's	Ottawa Civic Centre

April 4	Ottawa 67's	4 – 2	North Bay Centennials	North Bay Memorial Gardens

April 5	North Bay Centennials	3 – 4	OT	Ottawa 67's	Ottawa Civic Centre

April 7	Ottawa 67's	3 – 6	North Bay Centennials	North Bay Memorial Gardens

April 9	North Bay Centennials	2 – 6	Ottawa 67's	Ottawa Civic Centre

Ottawa wins series 4 – 2

==== Emms Division ====
===== (2) Niagara Falls Thunder vs. (4) Windsor Spitfires =====
March 30	Windsor Spitfires	2 – 7	Niagara Falls Thunder	Niagara Falls Memorial Arena

March 31	Niagara Falls Thunder	10 – 4	Windsor Spitfires	Windsor Arena

April 2	Windsor Spitfires	3 – 4	Niagara Falls Thunder	Niagara Falls Memorial Arena

April 4	Niagara Falls Thunder	6 – 5	Windsor Spitfires	Windsor Arena

Niagara Falls wins series 4 – 0

=== Division finals ===
==== Leyden Division ====
===== (1) Oshawa Generals vs. (4) Ottawa 67's =====
April 12	Ottawa 67's	2 – 4	Oshawa Generals	Oshawa Civic Auditorium

April 14	Oshawa Generals	5 – 8	Ottawa 67's	Ottawa Civic Centre

April 16	Ottawa 67's	2 – 8	Oshawa Generals	Oshawa Civic Auditorium

April 18	Oshawa Generals	6 – 5	OT	Ottawa 67's	Ottawa Civic Centre

April 21	Ottawa 67's	2 – 6	Oshawa Generals	Oshawa Civic Auditorium

Oshawa wins series 4 – 1

==== Emms Division ====
===== (1) Sault Ste. Marie Greyhounds vs. (2) Niagara Falls Thunder =====
April 11	Niagara Falls Thunder	2 – 7	Sault Ste. Marie Greyhounds	Sault Memorial Gardens

April 12	Niagara Falls Thunder	0 – 2	Sault Ste. Marie Greyhounds	Sault Memorial Gardens

April 15	Sault Ste. Marie Greyhounds	6 – 4	Niagara Falls Thunder	Niagara Falls Memorial Arena

April 16	Sault Ste. Marie Greyhounds	8 – 3	Niagara Falls Thunder	Niagara Falls Memorial Arena

Sault Ste. Marie wins series 4 – 0

=== J. Ross Robertson Cup ===
==== (L1) Oshawa Generals vs. (E1) Sault Ste. Marie Greyhounds ====
April 29	Sault Ste. Marie Greyhounds	4 – 2	Oshawa Generals	Oshawa Civic Auditorium

April 30	Sault Ste. Marie Greyhounds	4 – 5	Oshawa Generals	Oshawa Civic Auditorium

May 2	Oshawa Generals	5 – 6	OT	Sault Ste. Marie Greyhounds	Sault Memorial Gardens

May 3	Oshawa Generals	5 – 8	Sault Ste. Marie Greyhounds	Sault Memorial Gardens

May 5	Sault Ste. Marie Greyhounds	2 – 4	Oshawa Generals	Oshawa Civic Auditorium

May 6	Oshawa Generals	2 – 4	Sault Ste. Marie Greyhounds	Sault Memorial Gardens

Sault Ste. Marie wins series 4 – 2

== Awards ==
J. Ross Robertson Cup:	Sault Ste. Marie Greyhounds
Hamilton Spectator Trophy:	Oshawa Generals
Leyden Trophy:	Oshawa Generals
Emms Trophy:	Sault Ste. Marie Greyhounds
Red Tilson Trophy:	Eric Lindros, Oshawa Generals
Eddie Powers Memorial Trophy:	Eric Lindros, Oshawa Generals
Matt Leyden Trophy:	George Burnett, Niagara Falls Thunder
Jim Mahon Memorial Trophy:	Rob Pearson, Oshawa Generals
Max Kaminsky Trophy:	Chris Snell, Ottawa 67's
OHL Goaltender of the Year:	Mike Torchia, Kitchener Rangers
Jack Ferguson Award:	Todd Harvey, Detroit Compuware Ambassadors
Dave Pinkney Trophy:	Mark Lenarduzzi and Kevin Hodson, Sault Ste. Marie Greyhounds
OHL Executive of the Year:	Sherwood Bassin, Sault Ste. Marie Greyhounds
Emms Family Award:	Cory Stillman, Windsor Spitfires
F.W. 'Dinty' Moore Trophy:	Kevin Hodson, Sault Ste. Marie Greyhounds
William Hanley Trophy:	Dale Craigwell, Oshawa Generals
Leo Lalonde Memorial Trophy:	Joey St. Aubin, Kitchener Rangers
Bobby Smith Trophy:	Nathan LaFayette, Cornwall Royals

== 1991 OHL Priority Selection ==
The Detroit Compuware Ambassadors held the first overall pick in the 1991 Ontario Priority Selection and selected Todd Harvey from the Cambridge Winterhawks. Harvey was awarded the Jack Ferguson Award, awarded to the top pick in the draft.

Below are the players who were selected in the first round of the 1991 Ontario Hockey League Priority Selection.

#	Player	Nationality	OHL Team	Hometown	Minor Team
1	Todd Harvey (C)	Canada	Detroit Compuware Ambassadors	Sheffield, Ontario	Cambridge Winter Hawks
2	Jeff Smith (D)	Canada	Owen Sound Platers	Belleville, Ontario	Wellington Dukes
3	Chris Gratton (C)	Canada	Kingston Frontenacs	Brantford, Ontario	Brantford Classics
4	Larry Courville (LW)	Canada	Cornwall Royals	Timmins, Ontario	Waterloo Siskins
5	Todd Bertuzzi (LW)	Canada	Guelph Storm	Sudbury, Ontario	Sudbury Midgets
6	Trevor Gallant (C)	Canada	Kitchener Rangers	London, Ontario	London Diamonds
7	Jamie Allison (D)	Canada	Windsor Spitfires	Whitby, Ontario	Waterloo Siskins
8	Jamie Rivers (D)	Canada	Sudbury Wolves	Ottawa, Ontario	Ottawa Jr. Senators
9	Dave Roche (LW)	Canada	Peterborough Petes	Peterborough, Ontario	Peterborough Jr. Petes
10	Jason Allison (C)	Canada	London Knights	North York, Ontario	North York Rangers
11	Steve Washburn (C)	Canada	Ottawa 67's	Gloucester, Ontario	Gloucester Rangers
12	Kevin Brown (RW)	Canada	Belleville Bulls	Mississauga, Ontario	Waterloo Siskins
13	Brad Brown (D)	Canada	North Bay Centennials	Mississauga, Ontario	Toronto Red Wings
14	Ethan Moreau (LW)	Canada	Niagara Falls Thunder	Orillia, Ontario	Orillia Terriers
15	Aaron Gavey (C)	Canada	Sault Ste. Marie Greyhounds	Peterborough, Ontario	Peterborough Jr. Petes
16	Jason Arnott (C)	Canada	Oshawa Generals	Wasaga Beach, Ontario	Lindsay Bears

== See also ==
- List of OHA Junior A standings
- List of OHL seasons
- 1990–91 WHL season
- 1990–91 QMJHL season
- 1991 Memorial Cup
- 1991 NHL entry draft
- 1990 in sports
- 1991 in sports

Preceded by 1989–90 OHL season	OHL seasons	Succeeded by 1991–92 OHL season
