= Dave Simpson (ice hockey) =

- Born: March 3, 1962 (age 64) London, Ontario, Canada
- Height: 6 ft 0 in (183 cm)
- Weight: 190 lb (86 kg; 13 st 8 lb)
- Position: Centre
- Shot: Left
- Played for: Indianapolis Checkers; Baltimore Skipjacks
- NHL draft: 59th overall, 1980; New York Islanders
- Playing career: 1981–1986

David Stewart Simpson (born March 3, 1962) is a Canadian former ice hockey player, now executive director of the Business Families Centre at the Richard Ivey School of Business at the University of Western Ontario.

He played junior hockey for the London Knights of the Ontario Hockey League, and recorded the best single season in team history when he recorded 155 points in 1981-82. He holds the record for most points by a rookie in a single game. In that year he also won the Red Tilson Trophy, Bobby Smith Trophy, William Hanley Trophy and the Eddie Powers Memorial Trophy for his accomplishments in junior hockey, as well as being named the CHL Player of the Year. No other player in OHL history has won so many trophies in one season.

He was drafted in the third round (59th overall) of the 1980 NHL entry draft by the New York Islanders. He played minor pro hockey in Indianapolis and Baltimore, but decided in 1984 that hockey was not for him and retired to concentrate on his schooling. He received a B.A. in 1985 from the University of Western Ontario, and an M.B.A. in 1988 from the Richard Ivey School of Business.

He is the older brother of former NHL player and assistant coach and current CBC hockey broadcaster Craig Simpson and MSG Plus sportscaster Christine Simpson. He is also the son of Canadian former Olympic athlete Marion Simpson.

Simpson's nephew, Dillon Simpson, was drafted by the Edmonton Oilers.

== Career statistics ==
			Regular season					Playoffs
Season	Team	League	GP	G	A	Pts	PIM	GP	G	A	Pts	PIM
1977–78	London Knights	OMJHL	1	0	1	1	0	—	—	—	—	—
1979–80	London Knights	OMJHL	68	29	44	73	38	—	—	—	—	—
1980–81	London Knights	OHL	67	34	56	90	80	—	—	—	—	—
1981–82	London Knights	OHL	68	67	88	155	18	4	3	3	6	2
1981–82	Indianapolis Checkers	CHL	3	0	1	1	0	7	1	6	7	4
1982–83	Indianapolis Checkers	CHL	70	29	39	68	69	13	7	13	20	12
1983–84	Indianapolis Checkers	CHL	72	24	43	67	26	10	1	5	6	2
1985–86	Baltimore Skipjacks	AHL	79	13	19	32	56	—	—	—	—	—
CHL totals			145	53	83	136	95	30	9	24	33	18

Preceded by Dale Hawerchuk	CHL Player of the Year; 1982	Succeeded by Pat LaFontaine
