= Niagara Falls Thunder =

Canadian junior ice hockey team (1988–1996)

- City: Niagara Falls, Ontario
- League: Ontario Hockey League
- Operated: 1988–1996
- Home arena: Niagara Falls Memorial Arena
- Colours: Red, white and black

Franchise history
- 1946–1953: Windsor Spitfires
- 1953–1960: Hamilton Tiger Cubs
- 1960–1974: Hamilton Red Wings
- 1974–1978: Hamilton/St. Catharines Fincups
- 1978–1984: Brantford Alexanders
- 1984–1988: Hamilton Steelhawks
- 1988–1996: Niagara Falls Thunder
- 1996–present: Erie Otters

The Niagara Falls Thunder were a junior ice hockey team in the Ontario Hockey League from 1988 to 1996. The team was based in Niagara Falls, Ontario.

== History ==
Niagara Falls became home to its third OHL franchise in 1988 upon the relocation of the Hamilton Steelhawks. The new team was named the Niagara Falls Thunder. The team filled the void left behind when the Niagara Falls Flyers departed for North Bay in 1982.

The Thunder picked up on the winning note of the Steelhawks' last season in Hamilton. Coach Bill LaForge returned with a strong core of players that lead the team to a second-place finish in 1988–89. Niagara Falls reached the OHL finals the first year in their new home city, losing to the Peterborough Petes.

The uniform history of the Niagara Falls Thunder

Twenty games into the 1989–90 OHL season, team owner Rick Gay fired head coach Bill LaForge, and assistant coaches Benny Rogano, and Heavy Evason. Rick Gay was a businessman from Oshawa, and used his connection as a former director on the Oshawa Generals to hire their assistant coach, George Burnett as head coach and general manager for the Thunder. Randy Hall became an assistant coach to Burnett for the remainder of the season. Hall left to become head coach of the Kingston Frontenacs for 1990–91, but returned to Niagara Falls for the 1991–92 season. Niagara Falls native Chris Johnstone was Burnett's assistant coach for the 1990–91 season. In Burnett's three seasons with Niagara Falls, he coached 178 games in the regular season and earned 97 wins. Burnett's teams reached the third round of the playoffs each season, earning 26 postseason victories.

Burnett took over the Niagara Falls Thunder after they began the 1989–90 OHL season with only 4 wins and 2 ties in 20 games (4–14–2). The Thunder initially struggled with only one win in Burnett's first 12 games as coach before turning around. Burnett led Niagara Falls to a record of 19–25–2 during his tenure, and a record of 23–39–4 overall, to earn sixth place and the final playoff spot in the Emms Division. Keith Primeau won the Eddie Powers Memorial Trophy as the league's leading scorer, with 57 goals, 70 assists, and 127 points. Brad May was second in team scoring with 33 goals, 58 assists, and 91 points. Rounding out the top scorers were Jason Winch (71 points), Paul Laus (48 points) and Andy Bezeau (39 points). In the first round of the playoffs, Niagara faced the first placed London Knights. Burnett's Thunder won the first two games by scores of 7–6, and 5–1, then lost two in a row by scores of 2–6, and 3–5. Niagara pulled out a 3–2 victory in overtime in game five, then won game six by a 6–2 score to win an upset series. In the second round, Burnett's team faced the fourth placed Owen Sound Platers. Niagara lost the first game by a 3–7 score, but then Burnett coach four straight victories by scores of 11–2, 3–2, 4–3, and 7–4 to win the series in five games and earn a trip to the division finals. Niagara faced the second place Kitchener Rangers, trying to pull off a third consecutive upset. The Thunder lost the first two games by 2–5, and 1–5 scores, then won game three by a 6–5 score. The cinderella run by Burnett and Niagara Falls came to an end as the Thunder lost the last two games by 3–5, and 5–10 scores, and lost the series in five games. If Niagara had won the third round, they would have faced Burnett's old team, the Oshawa Generals in the finals.

In the 1990–91 OHL season, Burnett participated in his first OHL draft as a general manager. The Niagara Falls Thunder had five draft picks in the first three rounds. Burnett drafted three future NHLers; first round pick Steve Staios, second round pick Manny Legace, and third round pick Greg de Vries. Staios and Legace had an immediate impact for Burnett's team, however Greg de Vries did not report to Niagara Falls until the 1992–93 season. Burnett had the second highest scoring team in the OHL, with 335 goals scored. The team was led in scoring by second-year centre Todd Simon, with 51 goals, 74 assists, and 125 points. Jason Winch scored 40 goals, 82 assists, and 122 points. Also scoring 30 goals were John Johnson with 38 goals, and Brad May netted 37 goals. Burnett led the Thunder to a 39–18–9 record, earning 87 points and a second-place finish in the Emms Division. In the first round of the playoffs, Niagara Falls faced the fifth place Kitchener Rangers. Burnett's team won the first game 5–4 in overtime, then lost 6–7 in overtime, followed by two wins by 5–1, and 7–4 scores. After losing game five by a 3–4 score, Burnett and the Thunder won the series in six games with a 5–2 victory. In the second round, Niagara Falls faced the fourth place Windsor Spitfires, and swept the series in four games by scores of 7–2, 10–4, 4–3, and 6–5. Burnett had led the Thunder to the Emms Division finals again, and facing the first place Sault Ste. Marie Greyhounds. Niagara Falls was swept in four games by scores of 2–7, 0–2, 4–6, and 3–8. Burnett had greatly improved the Thunder by 37 points over the previous season, and was awarded the Matt Leyden Trophy for OHL Coach of the Year.

Burnett returned for a third year with the Thunder in 1991–92 OHL season, with most of the previous year's team intact. In the OHL draft, Burnett picked future NHLer Ethan Moreau in the first round, and defenceman Ryan Tocher in the second round. Burnett's team topped 300 goals scored for the season. Todd Simon led the team, and the league in scoring with 53 goals, 93 assists, and 146 points, to win the Eddie Powers Memorial Trophy. Other top scorers include Kevin Brown with 42 goals, 58 assists, and 100 points; Rick Corriveau with 21 goals, 57 assists, and 78 points; and Ethan Moreau with 20 goals, 36 assists, and 55 points in his rookie season. Burnett led the team to a 39–23–4 record, earning 82 points and second place in the Emms Division. In the playoffs, the Thunder faced the seventh place Detroit Compuware Ambassadors first round. Burnett's team struggled at first against Detroit, a team in its franchise's first playoff appearance. Detroit won the first two games by 3–5, and 3–4 scores. Niagara Falls won game three 8–6, but lost game four by a 3–5 score and was in danger of being eliminated. Burnett rallied his team to three straights wins by 6–3, 8–3, and 7–2 victories to win the series in seven games. In the second round the Thunder faced the third place London Knights. Burnett's team won another three straight games by scores of 4–3 in overtime OT, 4–3, and 5–4 in overtime. After a 2–4 loss in game four, the Thunder won game five by a 5–1 score. To return to the Emms division finals against the first place Sault Ste. Marie Greyhounds. Burnett's team won the first game 8–7, but then lost four straight by 2–7, 5–7, 3–4, and 1–7 scores. Burnett was awarded his second Matt Leyden Trophy as OHL Coach of the Year for 1991–92.

Many players graduated in 1992 for professional careers, and Coach Burnett was promoted to the Cape Breton Oilers of the AHL. He won the Calder Cup with the team in 1992–93.

The team never regained its strength of the first four seasons. After three poor seasons on the ice from 1992–93 to 1994–95, game attendance was dropping. This, combined with rescheduling of Sunday games to Saturday nights, and an aging arena with no new arena deal in sight, resulted in the Thunder moving to Erie, Pennsylvania, to play as the Otters.

== Coaches ==
George Burnett was voted the OHL Coach of the Year in the 1990–91 and 1991–92 seasons, winning the Matt Leyden Trophy in only his first and second full seasons as a head coach in the OHL.

- 1988–89 - Bill LaForge
- 1989–90 - B.LaForge, G.Burnett
- 1990–91 - George Burnett
- 1991–92 - George Burnett
- 1992–93 - Larry Marson
- 1993–94 - L.Marson, Randy Hall, C.Johnstone
- 1994–95 - Chris Johnstone
- 1995–96 - Chris Johnstone

== Players ==
=== Award winners ===
- 1988–89 - Bryan Fogarty, CHL Player of the Year & CHL Defenceman of the Year Award; Red Tilson Trophy, Most Outstanding Player; Eddie Powers Memorial Trophy, Scoring Champion; Max Kaminsky Trophy, Most Outstanding Defenceman
- 1988–89 - Stan Drulia, Jim Mahon Memorial Trophy, Top Scoring Right Winger, Leo Lalonde Memorial Trophy, Overage Player of the Year
- 1989–90 - Keith Primeau, Eddie Powers Memorial Trophy, Scoring Champion
- 1991–92 - Todd Simon, Red Tilson Trophy, Most Outstanding Player; Eddie Powers Memorial Trophy, Scoring Champion
- 1991–92 - Manny Legace, OHL Goaltender of the Year
- 1993–94 - Ethan Moreau, Bobby Smith Trophy, Scholastic Player of the Year

=== NHL alumni ===
List of Thunder alumni who played in the National Hockey League (NHL):

- Jason Bonsignore
- Brandon Convery
- Greg de Vries
- Stan Drulia
- Bryan Fogarty
- Paul Laus
- Mark Lawrence
- Jamie Leach
- Manny Legace
- Brad May
- Shawn McCosh
- Jay McKee
- Ethan Moreau
- Keith Osborne
- Jeff Paul
- Scott Pearson
- Keith Primeau
- John Purves
- Mike Rosati
- Todd Simon
- Steve Staios
- Dennis Vial
- Jason Ward

== Season-by-season results ==
Regular season and playoffs results:

Legend: GP = Games played, W = Wins, L = Losses, T = Ties, Pts = Points, GF = Goals for, GA = Goals against

Memorial Cup champions	OHL champions	OHL finalists

Season	Regular season									Playoffs
Season	GP	W	L	T	Pts	Pct	GF	GA	Finish	Playoffs
1988–89	66	41	23	2	84	0.636	410	319	2nd Emms	Won division quarterfinal (Windsor Spitfires) 4–0; Won semifinal (London Knights) 4–3; Lost OHL final (Peterborough Petes) 4–2
1989–90	66	23	39	4	50	0.379	278	355	6th Emms	Won division quarterfinal (London Knights) 4–2; Won quarterfinal (Owen Sound Platers) 4–2; Lost semifinal (Kitchener Rangers) 4–1
1990–91	66	39	18	9	87	0.659	335	259	2nd Emms	Won division quarterfinal (Kitchener Rangers) 4–2; Won quarterfinal (Windsor Spitfires) 4–0; Lost semifinal (Sault Ste. Marie Greyhounds) 4–0
1991–92	66	39	23	4	82	0.621	307	254	2nd Emms	Won division quarterfinal (Detroit Compuware Ambassadors) 4–3; Won quarterfinal (London Knights) 4–1; Lost semifinal (Sault Ste. Marie Greyhounds) 4–1
1992–93	66	29	30	7	65	0.492	299	274	5th Emms	Lost division quarterfinal (Owen Sound Platers) 4–0
1993–94	66	21	41	4	46	0.348	277	352	8th Emms	Did not qualify
1994–95	66	18	40	8	44	0.333	231	298	4th Central	Lost division quarterfinal (Owen Sound Platers) 4–2
1995–96	66	29	30	7	65	0.492	248	238	3rd Central	Won division quarterfinal (Owen Sound Platers) 4–2; Lost quarterfinal (Guelph Storm) 4–0

== Arena ==
The Niagara Falls Thunder played home games at Niagara Falls Memorial Arena from 1988 to 1996.
