= 1979–80 OMJHL season =

Canadian junior hockey season

The 1979–80 OMJHL season was the sixth season of the Ontario Major Junior Hockey League. The OMJHL inaugurates the Bobby Smith Trophy, named after Bobby Smith, awarded to the scholastic player of the year. Twelve teams each played 68 games. The Peterborough Petes won the J. Ross Robertson Cup, defeating the Windsor Spitfires.

== Regular season ==
=== Final standings ===
Note: GP = Games played; W = Wins; L = Losses; T = Ties; GF = Goals for; GA = Goals against; PTS = Points; x = clinched playoff berth; y = clinched first round bye; z = clinched division title & first round bye

=== Leyden Division ===
Rank	Team	GP	W	L	T	PTS	GF	GA
1	z-Peterborough Petes	68	47	20	1	95	316	238
2	y-Ottawa 67's	68	45	20	3	93	402	288
3	y-Oshawa Generals	68	42	26	0	84	329	275
4	x-Kingston Canadians	68	35	26	7	77	320	298
5	x-Sudbury Wolves	68	33	33	2	68	299	309
6	Sault Ste. Marie Greyhounds	68	22	45	1	45	281	379

=== Emms Division ===
Rank	Team	GP	W	L	T	PTS	GF	GA
1	z-Windsor Spitfires	68	36	31	1	73	323	344
2	y-Toronto Marlboros	68	33	32	3	69	342	310
3	y-Brantford Alexanders	68	31	35	2	64	412	398
4	x-Niagara Falls Flyers	68	29	39	0	58	325	355
5	x-London Knights	68	26	38	4	56	328	334
6	Kitchener Rangers	68	17	51	0	34	276	425

=== Scoring leaders ===
Player	Team	GP	G	A	Pts	PIM
Jim Fox	Ottawa 67's	52	65	101	166	30
Yvan Joly	Ottawa 67's	67	66	93	159	47
Mike Bullard	Brantford Alexanders	66	66	84	150	86
Sean Simpson	Ottawa 67's	67	65	84	149	8
Kevin LaVallee	Brantford Alexanders	65	65	70	135	50
Blair Barnes	Windsor Spitfires	66	63	67	130	98
Bobby Crawford	Oshawa Generals	68	61	68	129	48
Greg Terrion	Brantford Alexanders	67	44	78	122	13
Wayne Thompson	London Knights	68	47	74	121	34
Steve Ludzik	Niagara Falls Flyers	67	43	76	119	102

== Playoffs ==
Division quarter-finals
L4	Kingston	0
L5	Sudbury	3
E4	Niagara Falls	3
E5	London	2

Division semi-finals
L1	Peterborough	4
L5	Sudbury	2
L2	Ottawa	4
L3	Oshawa	3
E1	Windsor	4
E4	Niagara Falls	1
E2	Toronto	0
E3	Brantford	4

Division finals
L1	Peterborough	4
L2	Ottawa	0
E1	Windsor	4
E3	Brantford	3

J. Ross Robertson Cup
L1	Peterborough	4
E1	Windsor	0

=== Division quarter-finals ===
==== Leyden Division ====
===== (4) Kingston Canadians vs. (5) Sudbury Wolves =====
March 16	Sudbury Wolves	5 – 1	Kingston Canadians	Kingston Memorial Centre

March 18	Kingston Canadians	2 – 5	Sudbury Wolves	Sudbury Community Arena

March 20	Sudbury Wolves	7 – 5	Kingston Canadians	Kingston Memorial Centre

Sudbury wins series 3 – 0

==== Emms Division ====
===== (4) Niagara Falls Flyers vs. (5) London Knights =====
March 16	London Knights	2 – 5	Niagara Falls Flyers	Niagara Falls Memorial Arena

March 18	Niagara Falls Flyers	3 – 4	OT	London Knights	London Gardens

March 21	London Knights	2 – 7	Niagara Falls Flyers	Niagara Falls Memorial Arena

March 22	Niagara Falls Flyers	2 – 3	London Knights	London Gardens

March 23	London Knights	4 – 8	Niagara Falls Flyers	Niagara Falls Memorial Arena

Niagara Falls wins series 3 – 2

=== Division semi-finals ===
==== Leyden Division ====
===== (1) Peterborough Petes vs. (5) Sudbury Wolves =====
March 27	Sudbury Wolves	4 – 3	OT	Peterborough Petes	Peterborough Memorial Centre

March 28	Peterborough Petes	6 – 2	Sudbury Wolves	Sudbury Community Arena

March 30	Peterborough Petes	6 – 5	OT	Sudbury Wolves	Sudbury Community Arena

April 1	Peterborough Petes	5 – 4	Sudbury Wolves	Sudbury Community Arena

April 3	Sudbury Wolves	4 – 9	Peterborough Petes	Peterborough Memorial Centre

April 4	Peterborough Petes	5 – 1	Sudbury Wolves	Sudbury Community Arena

Peterborough wins series 4 – 2

===== (2) Ottawa 67's vs. (3) Oshawa Generals =====
March 21	Oshawa Generals	2 – 7	Ottawa 67's	Ottawa Civic Centre

March 23	Ottawa 67's	5 – 2	Oshawa Generals	Oshawa Civic Auditorium

March 28	Oshawa Generals	2 – 1	Ottawa 67's	Ottawa Civic Centre

March 30	Ottawa 67's	3 – 6	Oshawa Generals	Oshawa Civic Auditorium

April 1	Oshawa Generals	3 – 5	Ottawa 67's	Ottawa Civic Centre

April 3	Ottawa 67's	6 – 8	Oshawa Generals	Oshawa Civic Auditorium

April 4	Oshawa Generals	3 – 5	Ottawa 67's	Ottawa Civic Centre

Ottawa wins series 4 – 3

==== Emms Division ====
===== (1) Windsor Spitfires vs. (4) Niagara Falls Flyers =====
March 25	Niagara Falls Flyers	3 – 6	Windsor Spitfires	Windsor Arena

March 28	Windsor Spitfires	3 – 5	Niagara Falls Flyers	Niagara Falls Memorial Arena

March 30	Niagara Falls Flyers	6 – 9	Windsor Spitfires	Windsor Arena

April 1	Windsor Spitfires	6 – 1	Niagara Falls Flyers	Niagara Falls Memorial Arena

April 3	Niagara Falls Flyers	4 – 5	Windsor Spitfires	Windsor Arena

Windsor wins series 4 – 1

===== (2)Toronto Marlboros vs. (3) Brantford Alexanders =====
March 18	Brantford Alexanders	5 – 3	Toronto Marlboros	Maple Leaf Gardens

March 21	Toronto Marlboros	1 – 6	Brantford Alexanders	Brantford Civic Centre

March 23	Brantford Alexanders	5 – 4	OT	Toronto Marlboros	Maple Leaf Gardens

March 25	Toronto Marlboros	2 – 4	Brantford Alexanders	Brantford Civic Centre

Brantford wins series 4 – 0

=== Division finals ===
==== Leyden Division ====
===== (1) Peterborough Petes vs. (2) Ottawa 67's =====
April 6	Ottawa 67's	1 – 4	Peterborough Petes	Peterborough Memorial Centre

April 8	Peterborough Petes	2 – 1	OT	Ottawa 67's	Ottawa Civic Centre

April 10	Ottawa 67's	4 – 5	Peterborough Petes	Peterborough Memorial Centre

April 11	Peterborough Petes	6 – 4	Ottawa 67's	Ottawa Civic Centre

Peterborough wins series 4 – 0

==== Emms Division ====
===== (1) Windsor Spitfires vs. (3) Brantford Alexanders =====
April 6	Brantford Alexanders	3 – 4	OT	Windsor Spitfires	Windsor Arena

April 8	Windsor Spitfires	7 – 3	Brantford Alexanders	Brantford Civic Centre

April 10	Brantford Alexanders	5 – 4	Windsor Spitfires	Windsor Arena

April 13	Windsor Spitfires	4 – 5	OT	Brantford Alexanders	Brantford Civic Centre

April 15	Brantford Alexanders	5 – 4	Windsor Spitfires	Windsor Arena

April 17	Windsor Spitfires	10 – 6	Brantford Alexanders	Brantford Civic Centre

April 18	Brantford Alexanders	2 – 6	Windsor Spitfires	Windsor Arena

Windsor wins series 4 – 3

=== J. Ross Robertson Cup ===
==== (L1) Peterborough Petes vs. (E1) Windsor Spitfires ====
April 20	Windsor Spitfires	2 – 5	Peterborough Petes	Peterborough Memorial Centre

April 22	Peterborough Petes	3 – 2	Windsor Spitfires	Windsor Arena

April 24	Windsor Spitfires	1 – 3	Peterborough Petes	Peterborough Memorial Centre

April 26	Peterborough Petes	6 – 3	Windsor Spitfires	Windsor Arena

Peterborough wins series 4 – 0

== Awards ==
J. Ross Robertson Cup:	Peterborough Petes
Hamilton Spectator Trophy:	Peterborough Petes
Leyden Trophy:	Peterborough Petes
Emms Trophy:	Windsor Spitfires
Red Tilson Trophy:	Jim Fox, Ottawa 67's
Eddie Powers Memorial Trophy:	Jim Fox, Ottawa 67's
Matt Leyden Trophy:	Dave Chambers, Toronto Marlboros
Jim Mahon Memorial Trophy:	Jim Fox, Ottawa 67's
Max Kaminsky Trophy:	Larry Murphy, Peterborough Petes
Dave Pinkney Trophy:	Rick Laferriere and Terry Wright, Peterborough Petes
Emms Family Award:	Bruce Dowie, Toronto Marlboros
F.W. 'Dinty' Moore Trophy:	Mike Vezina, Ottawa 67's
William Hanley Trophy:	Sean Simpson, Ottawa 67's
Bobby Smith Trophy:	Steve Konroyd, Oshawa Generals

== See also ==
- List of OHA Junior A standings
- List of OHL seasons
- 1980 Memorial Cup
- 1980 NHL entry draft
- 1979 in sports
- 1980 in sports

Preceded by 1978–79 OMJHL season	OHL seasons	Succeeded by 1980–81 OHL season
