= Tyler Seguin =

Canadian ice hockey player (born 1992)

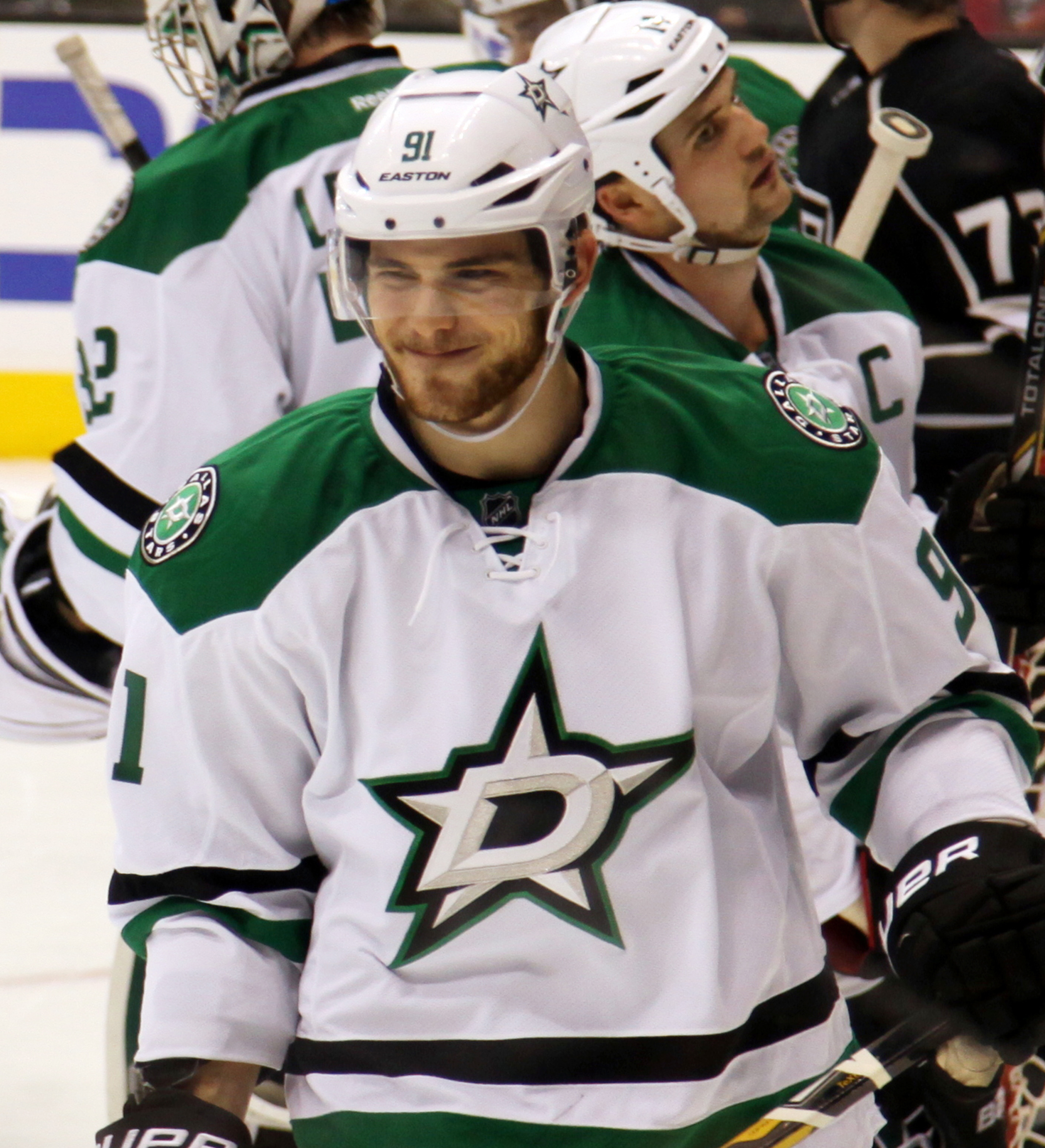
- Seguin with the Dallas Stars in December 2013
- Born: January 31, 1992 (age 34) Brampton, Ontario, Canada
- Height: 6 ft 2 in (188 cm)
- Weight: 205 lb (93 kg; 14 st 9 lb)
- Position: Forward
- Shoots: Right
- NHL team Former teams: Dallas Stars; Boston Bruins; EHC Biel
- NHL draft: 2nd overall, 2010; Boston Bruins
- Playing career: 2010–present
- Website: tylerseguin.com

Tyler Paul Seguin (/seɪɡɪn/ SAY-gihn; born January 31, 1992) is a Canadian professional ice hockey player who is a forward and alternate captain for Dallas Stars of the National Hockey League (NHL).

Growing up in Whitby, Ontario, Seguin began playing hockey in a house league at the age of five or six. During his major junior career with the Plymouth Whalers, he became the first member of the team to win the Red Tilson Trophy as MVP of the Ontario Hockey League since 1998 and tied for that 2009–10 Eddie Powers Memorial Trophy. Following that season, Seguin was selected second overall in the 2010 NHL entry draft by the Boston Bruins and went on to win the 2011 Stanley Cup in his rookie season.

During the 2012–13 NHL lockout, Seguin played for EHC Biel of the Swiss National League A (NLA) and finished the season with 25 goals, the most on the team. Upon returning to the NHL, he played in his second Stanley Cup Final in three seasons before being traded to the Dallas Stars on July 4, 2013.

== Early life ==
Seguin was born in Brampton, Ontario in 1992, but his family moved to Whitby when he was young to follow his father's career. His father Paul played college ice hockey for the University of Vermont, where he was roommates with future National Hockey League (NHL) star John LeClair, while his mother Jackie was a centre for the Brampton Canadettes Girls Hockey Association as a child. Tyler and his sisters Candace and Cassidy all played hockey growing up. All three played at centre like their mother, while Paul was a defenceman.

Seguin began playing hockey in a house league at the age of five or six, and developed a love for the sport from a young age. His minor ice hockey career began with the Wildcats of the Ontario Minor Hockey Association, and after moving back to Brampton at the age of 10, Seguin played three seasons with the Toronto Nationals of the Greater Toronto Hockey League (GTHL) alongside future Calder Trophy winner Jeff Skinner. Seguin also spent four years at St. Michael's College School in Toronto. He had his sights set on playing hockey at the University of Michigan, and believed that St. Michael's would be a good stepping stone towards that goal.

== Playing career ==
=== Amateur ===
The Plymouth Whalers of the Ontario Hockey League (OHL) drafted Seguin in the first round, ninth overall, of the 2008 OHL Priority Selection Draft. He chose to join the Whalers rather than attend college as he had originally planned, and began skating on the fourth line in the 2008–09 season. He struggled in his rookie junior ice hockey year, scoring only one goal in the first 17 games of the season. After Mike Vellucci returned to coach the Whalers and moved Seguin to the top two lines, his performance improved, and Seguin finished the season with 67 points in 61 games.

2009–10 proved to be a breakout year for Seguin, who led the league with 14 goals and 25 points in the first 10 games of the season. Eleven of those points came from the first four games of the season, including a hat trick against the London Knights. He finished the season with 106 points (48 goals and 58 assists) in 63 games, and, although the Whalers were swept in the second round of the 2010 playoffs, Seguin became the first member of the team to win the Red Tilson Trophy for most outstanding player in the OHL since David Legwand in 1998. He also tied with Taylor Hall of the Windsor Spitfires for that year's Eddie Powers Memorial Trophy, given to the top scorer in the OHL. At the 2010 CHL Top Prospects Game, Seguin was named the captain for Team Orr, which lost 4–2 to Team Cherry.

=== Professional (2010–present) ===
==== Draft ====
Going into the 2010 NHL entry draft, Seguin and Hall were considered the top two available players, with no consensus which one would become the first overall draft pick. Both players were tied for points scoring in the OHL for the previous season, while draft reports tended to emphasize Seguin's speed and Hall's strength. Danny Flynn of Bleacher Report referred to Seguin as an "elite playmaker" who lacked "skill on the defensive end", whereas Hall had proven his "greatness on the big stage", but had "shown a tendency to be selfish at times". Preliminary rankings from the NHL Central Scouting Bureau ranked Seguin the top OHL prospect, and Hall second. Although their positions switched during the midterm rankings, Seguin was named the No. 1 prospect in the bureau's final April rankings. Seguin ended up being selected second overall by the Boston Bruins, while Hall was taken first by the Edmonton Oilers.

==== Boston Bruins (2010–2013) ====
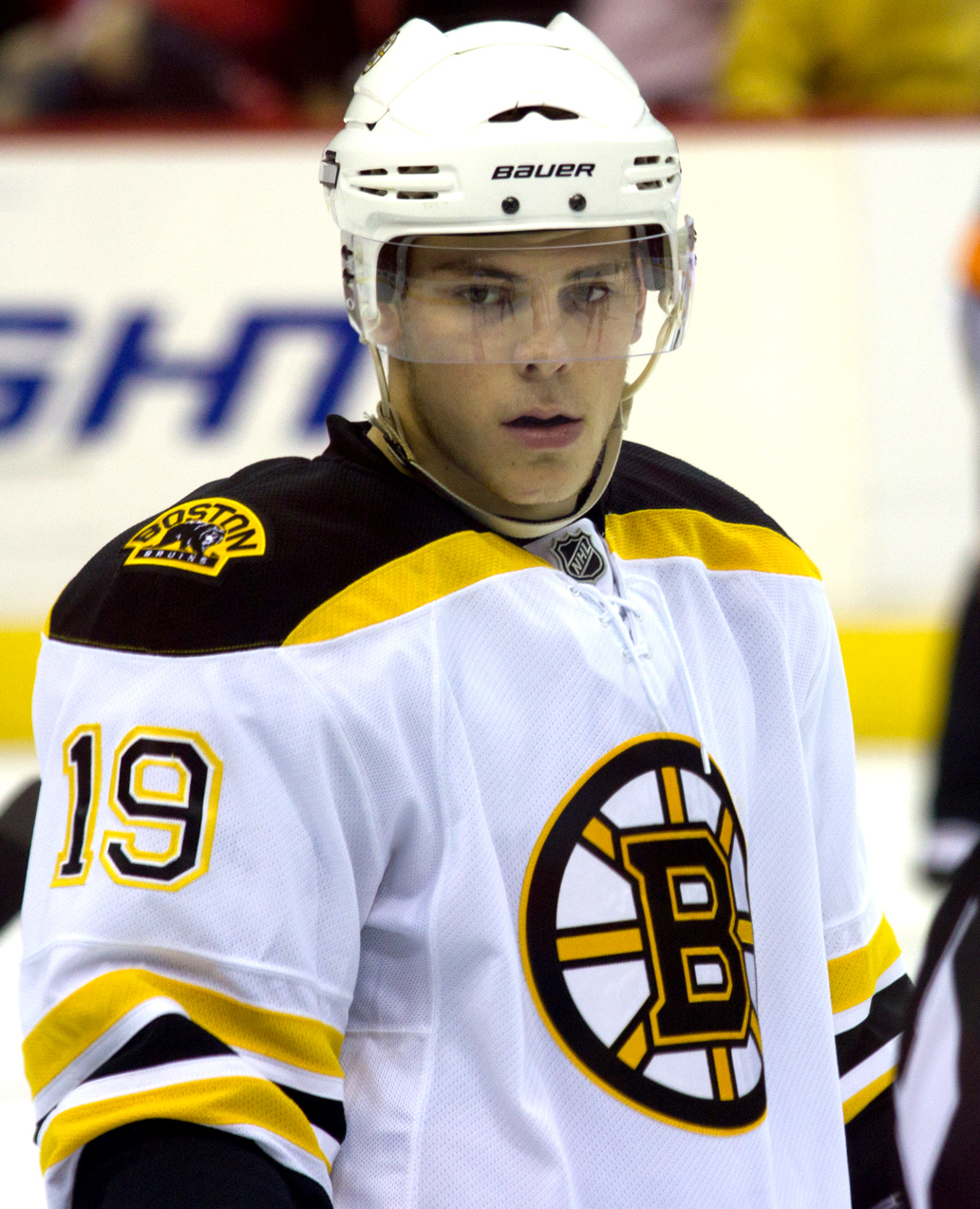
Seguin with the Boston Bruins in November 2010. The 2010–11 season was his rookie season in the NHL.

Shortly after being drafted, Seguin signed a three-year, $3.75 million entry-level contract with the Bruins, the maximum allowed for a contract of that nature. He made his NHL debut on October 9, 2010, with four shots on goal in a 5–2 loss to the Phoenix Coyotes. He scored his first professional goal the next day, receiving the puck on a pass from teammate Michael Ryder in the third period and scoring on a breakaway backhanded goal against goaltender Ilya Bryzgalov in a 3–0 shutout of the Coyotes. Seguin participated in the 2011 All-Star festivities during the Rookie Skills Competition. Late in the 2010–11 season, Seguin was quoted as having a desire to model his NHL playing style on that of teammate Patrice Bergeron. After being a healthy scratch for the first two rounds of the 2011 playoffs in the seven game victory against the Montreal Canadiens in the first round and four-game sweep over the Philadelphia Flyers in the second round, Seguin was included in the Boston lineup on the third line with Rich Peverley and Michael Ryder to start the third round, against the Tampa Bay Lightning after centreman Patrice Bergeron sustained a mild concussion in the fourth game of the previous round. In the first game of the series on May 14, 2011, Seguin scored a goal on Lightning' goaltender Dwayne Roloson and added an assist on a Johnny Boychuk goal in his first game of the series, his first career playoff game as the Bruins would go on to be defeated by the Lightning 5–2, then followed that up with two goals and two assists (both assists came on goals by Michael Ryder in a 6–5 win the following game). He became the first teenager to score four points in a Stanley Cup playoff game since Trevor Linden did so for the Vancouver Canucks in 1989. The Bruins would eventually go on to defeat the Lightning in seven games to clinch their first appearance in the Final since 1990. On June 15, 2011, Boston game seven of the Finals, earning the Stanley Cup with a 4–3 series victory over the Presidents' Trophy-winning Vancouver Canucks. Seguin ended his first playoff run with three goals and four assists for seven points in 13 games.

On November 5, 2011, Seguin scored his first career NHL hat trick against the team that traded the draft pick to the Bruins, the Toronto Maple Leafs. On November 14, Seguin was named NHL's First Star of the Week for his four goals and two assists that helped the Bruins to three wins in the week. On April 22, 2012, Seguin scored in overtime of game six of the first round in the 2012 playoffs series against the seventh-seeded Washington Capitals that sent the series to a game seven. However, despite another goal from Seguin in game seven, the Bruins would go on to lose the game in overtime and were thus eliminated from the playoffs with Capitals' forward Joel Ward scoring the winning goal. He finished his breakout 2011–12 season as the Bruins' leading scorer with 67 points (29 goals, 38 assists) in 81 games along with two goals and one assist for three points in all seven playoff games.

During the 2012–13 NHL lockout, Seguin was one of many Bruins who signed European hockey contracts, striking a deal with the EHC Biel hockey club of the Swiss National League A on September 21, 2012. He made his Swiss League debut on September 30, centreing Ahren Spylo and Eric Beaudoin on the second line and scoring an assist in a 6–3 loss to the Rapperswil-Jona Lakers. Seguin's first goal with the team came three days later, in the first period of his second appearance, a 2–1 win over EV Zug. Less than one month later, on October 24, Seguin recorded his second professional hat trick, and his first NLA hat trick, in a 5–4 shootout win over HC Ambri-Piotta. By November 27, he had accumulated 20 goals in 20 games, the most of any NHL lockout export to the NLA. On December 28, Seguin told NBC Sports Boston that, after representing Team Canada at the 2012 Spengler Cup, he would leave EHC Biel and return to the Bruins. In 29 NLA games that season, Seguin scored 25 goals and 15 assists for 40 points. He also befriended his teammate and fellow NHL star Patrick Kane, who returned to the Chicago Blackhawks upon the conclusion of the lockout. After the lockout ended, the 2012–13 NHL season began, with 48 intra-conference games played beginning on January 19, 2013. Seguin played all 48 regular-season games with the Bruins, scoring 16 goals and 16 assists for 32 points while playing the bulk of the season on the first line with Patrice Bergeron and Brad Marchand. His performance began to waver during the 2013 playoffs, however, scoring only one goal and three assists in his first 12 postseason games, and he was moved from the second to the third line with Rich Peverley and Chris Kelly, with Jaromír Jágr taking his place on the first and/or second. The Bruins advanced to the 2013 Stanley Cup Final, but ultimately fell to the Presidents' Trophy-winning Chicago Blackhawks in six games.

==== Dallas Stars (2013–present) ====
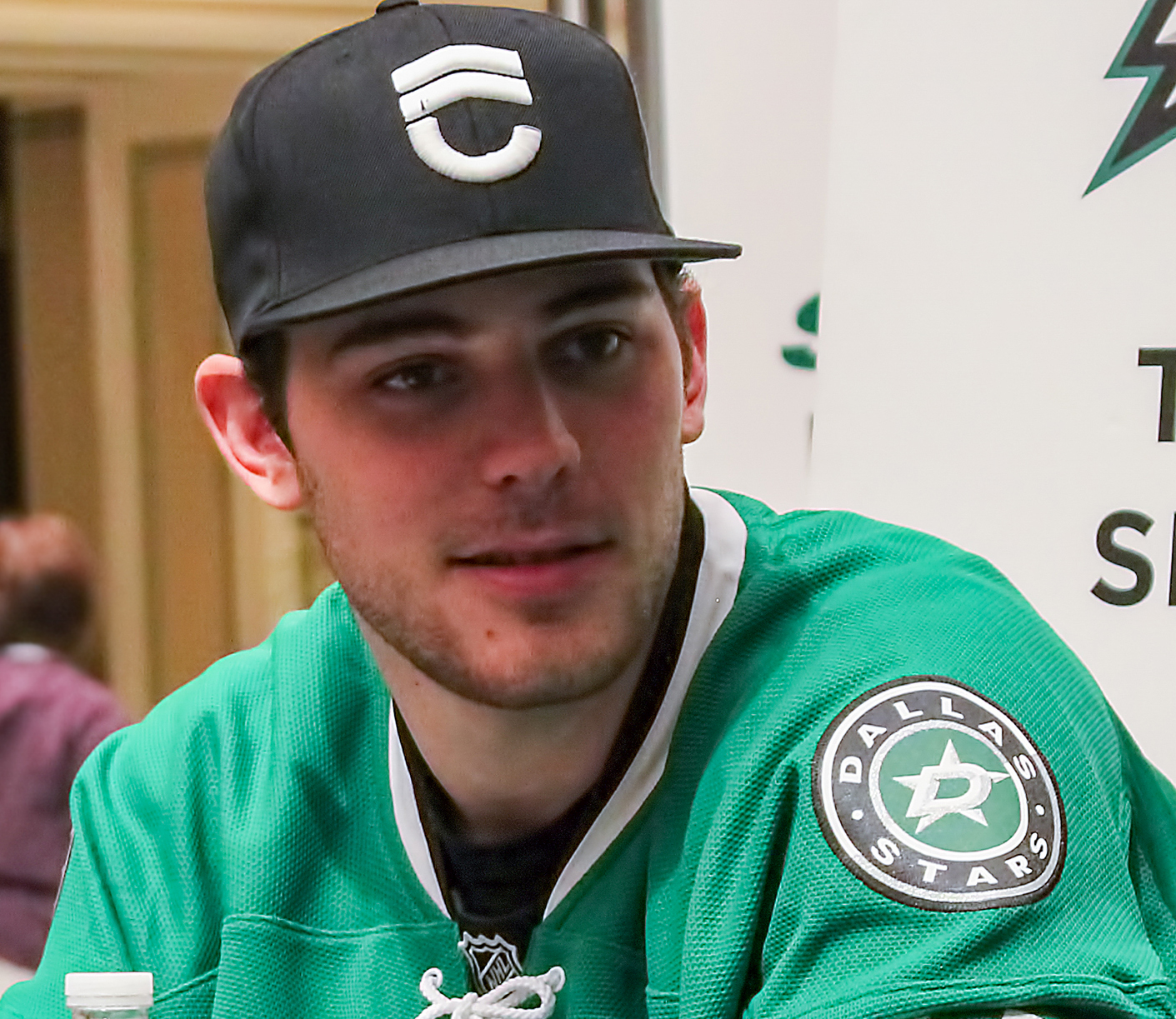
Seguin signing autographs at the Galleria Dallas in September 2014.

On July 4, 2013, just ten days after the Bruins game six loss in the Stanley Cup Final, Seguin was part of a massive seven-player trade that sent him, Peverley, and defenceman Ryan Button to the Dallas Stars in exchange for forward Loui Eriksson and prospects Joe Morrow, Reilly Smith, and Matt Fraser. Prior to the trade, rumors had begun to circulate that the Bruins were displeased with Seguin's supposed hard-partying lifestyle, particularly when his on-ice performance began to suffer during the playoffs. General manager Peter Chiarelli spoke in a press conference on July 4 to assert that, although the trade was "not a strict on-ice decision", but that concerns of Seguin's behavior were more related to "focus, just about little things, about preparing to play, it was nothing about extracurricular activities". The 2013–14 season saw Seguin become fast friends with captain Jamie Benn both on and off the ice. On November 14, 2013, Seguin had his first career four-point game, scoring two goals and two assists in a 7–3 rout of the Calgary Flames. On November 29, Seguin suffered what appeared to be a concussion in a 2–1 SO loss to the Chicago Blackhawks, causing him to miss the next two games. At the conclusion of the season which saw him end with 37 goals, 47 assists and 84 points, leading his team in all three categories and playing in 80 games, Seguin came in sixth overall in voting for the Hart Memorial Trophy, given to the "player judged most valuable to his team". He was also nominated for the King Clancy Memorial Trophy, given for leadership and humanitarianism; the award ultimately went to Edmonton Oilers defenceman and ex-Bruins teammate Andrew Ference. Seguin's production helped the Stars narrowly qualify for the 2014 playoffs as the eighth and final seed in the Western Conference, marking the first time since 2008 where the Stars as a team qualified for a playoff spot. Seguin and the Stars would eventually lose in the first round of the playoffs in six games by the top-seeded Anaheim Ducks.

On October 28, 2014, Seguin recorded his 100th NHL goal in a 4–3 loss to the St. Louis Blues. On February 13, 2015, in a 2–0 win over the Florida Panthers, Seguin sustained a torn MCL as he was clipped by Panthers' defenceman Dmitry Kulikov, resulting in him missing the next 10 games. Seguin would end the 2014–15 season with 37 goals and 40 assists and 78 points in 71 games. Despite his continued individual success, the Stars struggled as a team as they failed to qualify for the playoffs, finishing 10th in the West and missing the playoffs by seven points.

On March 17, 2016, Seguin sustained a cut to his Achilles tendon, and was expected to miss 3–4 weeks at the end of the season. He ultimately finished the 2015–16 season playing 72 games with 33 goals, 40 assists and 73 points.

Seguin recorded 26 goals and 46 assists for 72 points in all 82 games in the 2016–17 season as the Stars as a team struggled heavily, finishing 11th in the West and missing the playoffs for the second time in three seasons and by 15 points. Despite playing every game, Seguin revealed he had played the entire season through a torn labrum in his shoulder, which required surgery to repair.

On November 24, 2017, Seguin recorded his 200th NHL goal in a 6–4 win over the Calgary Flames. Seguin was named to the NHL All-Star Game for the fifth time on January 10, 2018. He was previously selected for the 2012, 2015, 2016, and 2017 NHL All-Star games. He finished the 2017–18 season playing all 82 games and recording 40 goals, 38 assists and 78 points as the Stars heavily improved compared to the previous season, finishing 10th in the West and missing the playoffs only by three points. The 40 goals was a career high in goals. He became only the third player in team history besides Jamie Benn and Mike Modano to have a 40-goal season. At the end of the 2017–18 season, Seguin was nominated by the Stars for the King Clancy Memorial Trophy for the second time but was not named a top three finalist in the league.

On September 13, 2018, Seguin signed an eight-year, $78.8 million contract extension with the Stars. Seguin finished the 2018–19 season playing all 82 games once more and leading his team in goals (33), assists (47) and points (80), respectively. His 47 assists tied the 2013–14 season for an individual career high in assists.

After blocking a shot on March 12, 2020, one of the final games before the cancelation of the last three weeks of the 2019–20 season due to the COVID-19 pandemic protocols, Seguin suffered two tears in his right vastus lateralis muscle. He chose to refrain from lower body workouts during the league pause in the hopes that the injury would resolve itself. He finished the season playing all 69 games and recording 17 goals, 33 assists and 50 points. His 33 assists and 50 points were most on the team. On July 29, during a practice before the Stars' exhibition game against the Nashville Predators, Seguin felt a "pop" in his hip that also caused pain in his knee. After playing through the 2020 playoffs, scoring only two goals in 26 games while making it to the 2020 Stanley Cup Final and losing in six games to the Tampa Bay Lightning, Seguin was told that he had completely torn his acetabular labrum. Due to restrictions surrounding the ongoing pandemic, Seguin's surgery was repeatedly delayed. Seguin received a right hip arthroscopy and labral repair on November 2. The expected timeline for his rehabilitation and recovery was subsequently adjusted from four to five months, due to the severity of the injury.

Seguin was activated from the injured reserve on May 3, 2021 making his debut that day and scoring a goal in the Stars' 5–4 overtime loss against Spencer Knight of the Florida Panthers. Played three games in the COVID-19 shortened 2020–21 season and recorded two goals and no assists for two points as the Stars missed the playoffs by four points.

On March 22, 2022, Seguin scored his 300th goal in a 5–3 win over the Edmonton Oilers on Oilers' goaltender Mikko Koskinen. Seguin finished the 2021–22 season with 24 goals and 25 assists for 49 points as the Stars returned to the playoffs as a result of their seventh seed finish but the Stars would fall in seven games in the first round to the second-seeded Calgary Flames. In the series, Seguin recorded two goals and assists for four points in all seven games. After the series ended, it was revealed that Seguin played through a broken foot suffered in game one of the series.

After playing 19 of the first 24 games of the 2024–25 season and recording nine goals and 11 assists for 20 points, it was announced on December 4, 2024, that Seguin would undergo hip surgery to repair a femoral acetabular infringement and labrum, taking him out of the Stars line-up for four-to-six months. Seguin returned to the Stars lineup on April 16, 2025, against the Nashville Predators, after not playing in a game since December 1, 2024. Seguin started the game, and 16 seconds into his return, he assisted on a goal by Mason Marchment to give the Stars an early 1-0 lead.

On October 30, 2025, Seguin played his 1,000th NHL game in a 2–1 overtime loss to the Tampa Bay Lightning. On December 1, during a game against the New York Rangers, Ranger's defenseman Vladislav Gavrikov fell backwards onto Seguin's right knee; Seguin fell to the ice and had to be helped to the locker room. It was reported he had an ACL tear and would miss the remainder of the regular season.

== International play ==
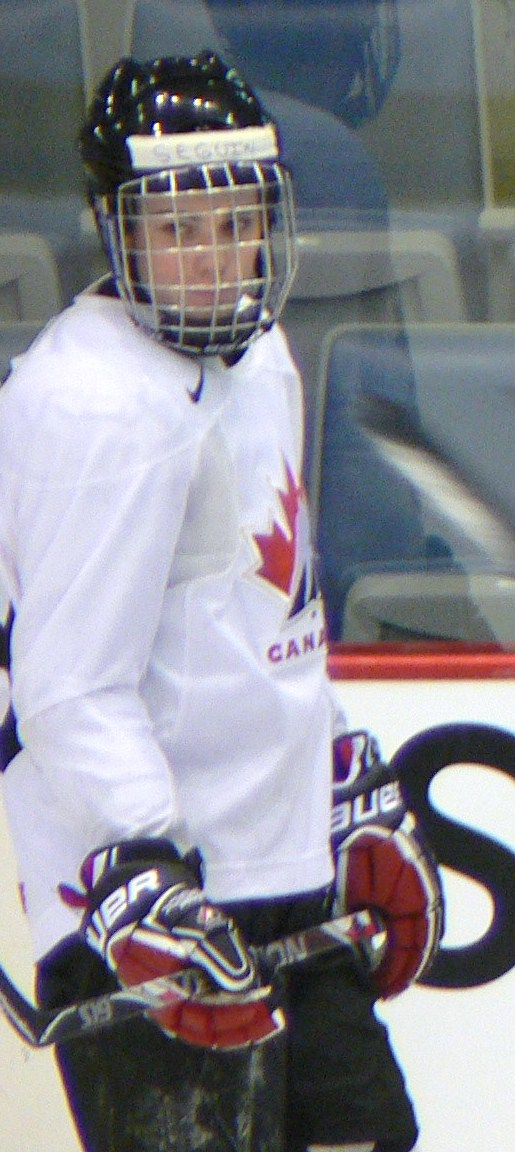
- Seguin at the team Canada tryouts for the 2010 World Junior Ice Hockey Championships

Medal record

Representing Canada

Ice hockey

World Championships
Gold medal – first place	2015 Czech Republic	

Ivan Hlinka Memorial Tournament
Gold medal – first place	2009 Slovakia	

Spengler Cup
Gold medal – first place	2012 Spengler Cup	

Representing Ontario

World U-17 Hockey Challenge
Gold medal – first place	2009 British Columbia	

Seguin's first international ice hockey tournament appearance was at the 2009 World U-17 Hockey Challenge, representing Canada Ontario. Seguin led the tournament with eight assists, and scored the first goal in Canada Ontario's 5–1 gold medal victory over Canada Pacific. That May, he received an invitation to the Canada U18 selection camp.

Seguin competed for Canada at the 2009 Ivan Hlinka Memorial Tournament in the Czech Republic, where he led the team in scoring with ten points in four games as Canada won the gold medal. He then attended Hockey Canada's selection camp for the 2010 World Junior Ice Hockey Championships in December 2009, but did not make the team. Previously, he won gold with Team Ontario in the 2009 World U-17 Hockey Challenge in Port Alberni, British Columbia, and finished second in tournament scoring with 11 points in six games. Seguin attended Canada's World Junior selection camp in Regina, Saskatchewan, for the World Junior Championships, the under-20 level, but again failed to make the team. In 2015, he was a member of Canada's gold medal-winning team at the World Hockey Championships.

== Activism ==
Seguin attended a Black Lives Matter protest independently from the NHL. On August 3, 2020, Ryan Reaves of the Vegas Golden Knights approached Seguin of the Dallas Stars before the two teams played each other. He told Seguin that he planned to kneel during the anthem. Seguin agreed to join him. Seguin then told the locker room about what he planned to do, and Jason Dickinson from the Stars volunteered to join him. Reaves, who is Black, and three white players—Seguin, Dickinson, and Knights goalie Robin Lehner—knelt for both the American and Canadian national anthems.

== Personal life ==
After wearing a No. 9 jersey in his childhood, Seguin chose to wear No. 19 when he reached the NHL, as a tribute to his favorite player, Steve Yzerman. When he was traded to Dallas, where No. 19 was retired in honor of Bill Masterton, he flipped the numbers, and wears No. 91. He is the second player to wear No. 91 in franchise history, following Brad Richards.

Seguin is sponsored by Dunkin' Donuts, Adidas, Bauer Hockey and BioSteel Sports Supplements. In 2014, Seguin bought Mike Modano's Dallas home.

In 2017, Seguin made a cameo appearance in the movie Goon: Last of the Enforcers.

Seguin married Kate Kirchof in July 2023 in the Bahamas. In July 2024, the couple announced via social media that they are expecting their first child in January 2025.

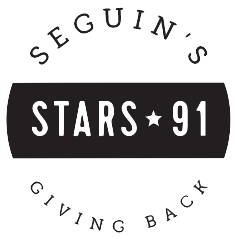
Seguin's Stars logo

=== Philanthropy ===
As the result of one of his best friends suffering a severe spinal cord injury in December 2012, Seguin founded Seguin's Stars upon arriving in Dallas several months later in July 2013. At every Stars home game during the season, Seguin donated a luxury suite, along with food and beverage, for individuals with spinal cord injuries. Seguin's Stars, along with Dallas Stars Foundation also donated a luxury suite to the Big Brothers Big Sisters organization in 2015 and 2017. At the conclusion of every game, Seguin meets his special guests outside of the Stars' locker room for autographs and pictures, often with other members of the team.

== Career statistics ==
=== Regular season and playoffs ===
			Regular season					Playoffs
Season	Team	League	GP	G	A	Pts	PIM	GP	G	A	Pts	PIM
2008–09	Plymouth Whalers	OHL	61	21	46	67	28	11	5	11	16	8
2009–10	Plymouth Whalers	OHL	63	48	58	106	54	9	5	5	10	8
2010–11	Boston Bruins	NHL	74	11	11	22	18	13	3	4	7	2
2011–12	Boston Bruins	NHL	81	29	38	67	30	7	2	1	3	0
2012–13	EHC Biel	NLA	29	25	15	40	24	—	—	—	—	—
2012–13	Boston Bruins	NHL	48	16	16	32	16	22	1	7	8	4
2013–14	Dallas Stars	NHL	80	37	47	84	18	6	1	2	3	0
2014–15	Dallas Stars	NHL	71	37	40	77	20	—	—	—	—	—
2015–16	Dallas Stars	NHL	72	33	40	73	16	1	0	0	0	0
2016–17	Dallas Stars	NHL	82	26	46	72	22	—	—	—	—	—
2017–18	Dallas Stars	NHL	82	40	38	78	43	—	—	—	—	—
2018–19	Dallas Stars	NHL	82	33	47	80	18	13	4	7	11	2
2019–20	Dallas Stars	NHL	69	17	33	50	22	26	2	11	13	12
2020–21	Dallas Stars	NHL	3	2	0	2	0	—	—	—	—	—
2021–22	Dallas Stars	NHL	81	24	25	49	30	7	2	2	4	4
2022–23	Dallas Stars	NHL	76	21	29	50	24	19	5	4	9	4
2023–24	Dallas Stars	NHL	68	25	27	52	26	19	5	8	13	2
2024–25	Dallas Stars	NHL	20	9	12	21	4	18	4	4	8	10
2025–26	Dallas Stars	NHL	27	7	10	17	2	—	—	—	—	—
NHL totals			1,016	367	459	826	309	151	29	50	79	40

=== International ===
Year	Team	Event	Result	GP	G	A	Pts	PIM
2009	Canada Ontario	U17	1st place, gold medalist(s)	6	3	8	11	8
2009	Canada	IH18	1st place, gold medalist(s)	4	4	6	10	6
2015	Canada	WC	1st place, gold medalist(s)	10	9	0	9	2
Junior totals				10	7	14	21	14
Senior totals				10	9	0	9	2

== Awards and honours ==
Award	Year
CHL / OHL
First All-Rookie Team	2009
First All-Star Team	2010
CHL/NHL Top Prospects Game	2010
CHL First All-Star Team	2010
Red Tilson Trophy	2010
Eddie Powers Memorial Trophy	2010
CHL Top Draft Prospect Award	2010
NHL
Stanley Cup champion	2011
NHL All-Star Game	2012, 2015, 2016, 2017, 2018, 2020
NLA
Media Lock-out All-Star Team	2012
Spengler Cup	2012

Awards and achievements
Preceded by Jordan Caron	Boston Bruins first-round draft pick 2010	Succeeded by Dougie Hamilton
