= Eddie Powers Memorial Trophy =

- Sport: Ice hockey
- Awarded for: Top point scorer in OHL

History
- First award: 1946
- Most recent: Nikita Klepov

The Eddie Powers Memorial Trophy is awarded annually by the Ontario Hockey League to the player scoring the most points in the regular season. The trophy was donated by the Toronto Marlboro Athletic Club in memory of athlete and coach Eddie Powers. It was first awarded in the 1945–46 OHA season. The Ontario Hockey League had retroactively recognized winners dating back to the 1933–34 OHA season. The winner of the Eddie Powers Memorial Trophy may also win the CHL Top Scorer Award

== Winners ==
List of winners of the Eddie Powers Memorial Trophy.

- Blue background denotes also won CHL Top Scorer Award.

Season	Winner	Team	Goals	Assists	Points
1933–34	J. J. Graboski	Oshawa Majors	23	23	46
1934–35	Jimmy Good	Toronto Lions	15	13	28
1935–36	Peanuts O'Flaherty	West Toronto Nationals	6	14	20
1936–37	Billy Taylor	Oshawa Generals	12	14	26
1937–38	Hank Goldup	Toronto Marlboros	25	16	41
1938–39	Billy Taylor	Oshawa Generals	22	31	53
1939–40	Jud McAtee	Oshawa Generals	25	19	44
1940–41	Gaye Stewart	Toronto Marlboros	31	13	44
1941–42	Bob Wiest	Brantford Lions	40	28	68
1942–43	Red Tilson	Oshawa Generals	19	38	57
1943–44	Ken Smith	Oshawa Generals	53	26	79
1944–45	Leo Gravelle	Toronto St. Michael's Majors	30	22	52
1945–46	Tod Sloan	Toronto St. Michael's Majors	43	32	75
1946–47	Fleming Mackell	Toronto St. Michael's Majors	49	33	82
1947–48	George Armstrong	Stratford Kroehlers	33	40	73
1948–49	Bert Giesebrecht	Windsor Spitfires	47	46	93
1949–50	Earl Reibel	Windsor Spitfires	53	76	129
1950–51	Lou Jankowski	Oshawa Generals	65	59	124
1951–52	Ken Laufman	Guelph Biltmores	53	86	139
1952–53	Jim McBurney	Galt Black Hawks	61	35	96
1953–54	Brian Cullen	St. Catharines Teepees	68	93	161
1954–55	Hank Ciesla	St. Catharines Teepees	57	49	106
1955–56	Stan Baluik	Kitchener Canucks	31	73	104
1956–57	Bill Sweeney	Guelph Biltmores	49	57	106
1957–58	John McKenzie	St. Catharines Teepees	48	51	99
1958–59	Stan Mikita	St. Catharines Teepees	38	59	97
1959–60	Chico Maki	St. Catharines Teepees	39	53	92
1960–61	Rod Gilbert	Guelph Royals	54	49	103
1961–62	Andre Boudrias	Montreal Junior Canadiens	34	63	97
1962–63	Wayne Maxner	Niagara Falls Flyers	32	62	94
1963–64	Andre Boudrias	Montreal Junior Canadiens	38	97	135
1964–65	Ken Hodge	St. Catharines Black Hawks	63	60	123
1965–66	Andre Lacroix	Peterborough Petes	40	80	120
1966–67	Derek Sanderson	Niagara Falls Flyers	41	60	101
1967–68	Tom Webster	Niagara Falls Flyers	50	64	114
1968–69	Rejean Houle	Montreal Junior Canadiens	53	55	108
1969–70	Marcel Dionne	St. Catharines Black Hawks	55	77	132
1970–71	Marcel Dionne	St. Catharines Black Hawks	62	81	143
1971–72	Dave Gardner	Toronto Marlboros	53	76	129
1971–72	Billy Harris	Toronto Marlboros	57	72	129
1972–73	Blake Dunlop	Ottawa 67's	60	99	159
1973–74	Jack Valiquette	Sault Ste. Marie Greyhounds	63	72	135
1973–74	Rick Adduono	St. Catharines Black Hawks	51	84	135
1974–75	Bruce Boudreau	Toronto Marlboros	68	97	165
1975–76	Mike Kaszycki	Sault Ste. Marie Greyhounds	51	119	170
1976–77	Dwight Foster	Kitchener Rangers	60	83	143
1977–78	Bobby Smith	Ottawa 67's	69	123	192
1978–79	Mike Foligno	Sudbury Wolves	65	85	150
1979–80	Jim Fox	Ottawa 67's	65	101	166
1980–81	John Goodwin	Sault Ste. Marie Greyhounds	56	110	166
1981–82	Dave Simpson	London Knights	67	88	155
1982–83	Doug Gilmour	Cornwall Royals	70	107	177
1983–84	Tim Salmon	Kingston Canadians	45	100	145
1984–85	Dave MacLean	Belleville Bulls	64	90	154
1985–86	Ray Sheppard	Cornwall Royals	81	61	142
1986–87	Scott McCrory	Oshawa Generals	51	99	150
1987–88	Andrew Cassels	Ottawa 67's	48	103	151
1988–89	Bryan Fogarty	Niagara Falls Thunder	47	108	155
1989–90	Keith Primeau	Niagara Falls Thunder	57	70	127
1990–91	Eric Lindros	Oshawa Generals	71	78	149
1991–92	Todd Simon	Niagara Falls Thunder	53	93	146
1992–93	Andrew Brunette	Owen Sound Platers	62	100	162
1993–94	Jason Allison	London Knights	55	87	142
1994–95	Marc Savard	Oshawa Generals	43	96	139
1995–96	Aaron Brand	Sarnia Sting	46	73	119
1996–97	Marc Savard	Oshawa Generals	43	87	130
1997–98	Peter Sarno	Windsor Spitfires	33	88	121
1998–99	Peter Sarno	Sarnia Sting	37	93	130
1999–2000	Sheldon Keefe	Barrie Colts	48	73	121
2000–01	Kyle Wellwood	Belleville Bulls	35	83	118
2001–02	Nathan Robinson	Belleville Bulls	47	63	110
2002–03	Corey Locke	Ottawa 67's	63	88	151
2003–04	Corey Locke	Ottawa 67's	51	67	118
2004–05	Corey Perry	London Knights	47	83	130
2005–06	Rob Schremp	London Knights	57	88	145
2006–07	Patrick Kane	London Knights	62	83	145
2007–08	Justin Azevedo	Kitchener Rangers	43	81	124
2008–09	John Tavares	Oshawa Generals/London Knights	58	46	104
2009–10	Tyler Seguin	Plymouth Whalers	48	58	106
2009–10	Taylor Hall	Windsor Spitfires	40	66	106
2010–11	Tyler Toffoli	Ottawa 67's	57	51	108
2010–11	Jason Akeson	Kitchener Rangers	24	84	108
2011–12	Michael Sgarbossa	Sudbury Wolves	47	55	102
2012–13	Vincent Trocheck	Saginaw Spirit/Plymouth Whalers	50	59	109
2013–14	Connor Brown	Erie Otters	45	83	128
2014–15	Dylan Strome	Erie Otters	45	84	129
2015–16	Kevin Labanc	Barrie Colts	39	88	127
2016–17	Alex DeBrincat	Erie Otters	65	62	127
2017–18	Aaron Luchuk	Windsor Spitfires/Barrie Colts	50	65	115
2018–19	Jason Robertson	Kingston Frontenacs/Niagara IceDogs	48	69	117
2019–20	Marco Rossi	Ottawa 67's	39	81	120
2020–21	Not awarded, season cancelled due to COVID-19 pandemic				
2021–22	Wyatt Johnston	Windsor Spitfires	46	78	124
2022–23	Matthew Maggio	Windsor Spitfires	54	57	111
2023–24	David Goyette	Sudbury Wolves	40	77	117
2024–25	Michael Misa	Saginaw Spirit	62	72	134
2025–26	Nikita Klepov	Saginaw Spirit	37	60	97

== See also ==
- Jean Béliveau Trophy – Quebec Major Junior Hockey League top scorer
- Bob Clarke Trophy – Western Hockey League top scorer
- List of Canadian Hockey League awards
