= Yvan Joly =

Canadian ice hockey player

- Born: February 6, 1960 (age 65); Hawkesbury, Ontario, Canada
- Height: 5 ft 8 in (173 cm)
- Weight: 169 lb (77 kg; 12 st 1 lb)
- Position: Right wing
- Shot: Right
- Played for: Montreal Canadiens; HC Gherdëina
- NHL draft: 100th overall, 1979; Montreal Canadiens
- Playing career: 1980–1986

Yvan Joseph Rene Joly (born February 6, 1960) is a Canadian former professional ice hockey forward. He played 2 games in the National Hockey League with the Montreal Canadiens, one each during the 1980–81 and 1982–83 seasons, and 1 playoff game in 1980. The rest of his career, which lasted from 1980 to 1986, was mainly spent in the minor leagues.

== Career statistics ==
=== Regular season and playoffs ===
			Regular season					Playoffs
Season	Team	League	GP	G	A	Pts	PIM	GP	G	A	Pts	PIM
1976–77	Ottawa 67's	OMJHL	62	30	26	56	36	—	—	—	—	—
1977–78	Ottawa 67's	OMJHL	64	34	37	71	67	16	7	8	15	24
1978–79	Ottawa 67's	OMJHL	66	53	59	112	45	4	0	2	2	6
1979–80	Ottawa 67's	OMJHL	67	66	93	159	47	11	4	12	16	13
1979–80	Montreal Canadiens	NHL	—	—	—	—	—	1	0	0	0	0
1980–81	Montreal Canadiens	NHL	1	0	0	0	0	—	—	—	—	—
1980–81	Nova Scotia Voyageurs	AHL	68	14	27	41	74	4	1	0	1	0
1981–82	Nova Scotia Voyageurs	AHL	71	20	30	50	75	9	2	3	5	8
1982–83	Montreal Canadiens	NHL	1	0	0	0	0	—	—	—	—	—
1982–83	Nova Scotia Voyageurs	AHL	76	43	37	80	52	7	2	1	3	2
1983–84	HC Gherdëina	ITA	19	15	18	33	10	—	—	—	—	—
1983–84	HC Ambrì-Piotta	NLB	—	—	—	—	—	—	—	—	—	—
1983–84	Maine Mariners	AHL	39	12	17	29	25	14	0	5	5	4
1985–86	Indianapolis Checkers	IHL	17	1	6	7	28	—	—	—	—	—
AHL totals			254	89	111	200	226	34	5	9	14	14
NHL totals			2	0	0	0	0	1	0	0	0	0

=== International ===
Year	Team	Event	GP	G	A	Pts	PIM
1979	Canada	WJC	5	2	0	2	2
1980	Canada	WJC	5	3	0	3	8
Junior totals			10	5	0	5	10
