= Red Tilson Trophy =

Annual award for most outstanding player in the Ontario Hockey League

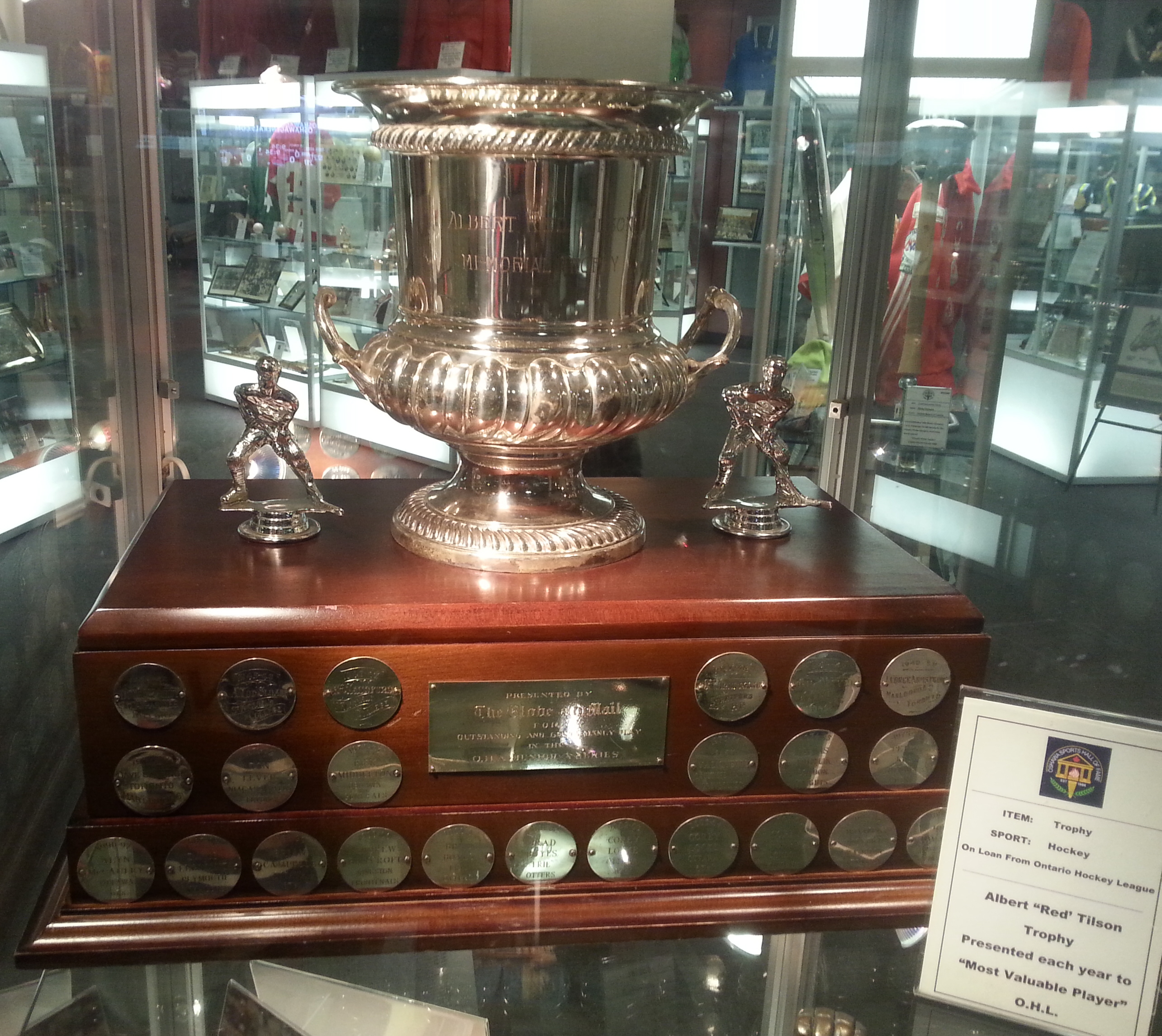
- Sport: Ice hockey
- Awarded for: OHL MVP

History
- First award: 1945
- Most recent: Sam O'Reilly

The Red Tilson Trophy is awarded annually by the Ontario Hockey League to the most outstanding player (MVP) as voted by OHL writers and broadcasters. It was donated by The Globe and Mail, and first awarded in the 1944–45 OHA season by the Ontario Hockey Association The trophy is named for Red Tilson, who played for the Oshawa Generals, and died during military service in World War II. Winners of the Red Tilson Trophy are nominated for the CHL Player of the Year award. The Red Tilson trophy resides in the Oshawa Sports Hall of Fame, in the Tribute Communities Centre.

== Red Tilson ==
The trophy is named for Albert "Red" Tilson, (January 13, 1924 – October 27, 1944) a former Oshawa Generals player killed in service in World War II. Tilson was born in Regina, Saskatchewan to William and Mary Tilson. He was nicknamed "Red" for his hair colour. He played two seasons for the Generals beginning with the 1941–42 OHA season, and won the J. Ross Robertson Cup both seasons. Tilson won the Eddie Powers Memorial Trophy in the 1942–43 OHA season as the top scorer in the league with 19 goals, and 38 assists. Tilson enlisted in the Canadian Armed Forces on May 27, 1943 at Kingston, Ontario. Tilson was a lance corporal in The Queen's Own Rifles of Canada R.C.I.C. Tilson was killed in action in the Netherlands, on October 27, 1944. Tilson is interred in the Adegem Canadian War Cemetery, near Maldegem, Belgium. The Generals retired his uniform #9 on November 12, 2006.

== Winners ==
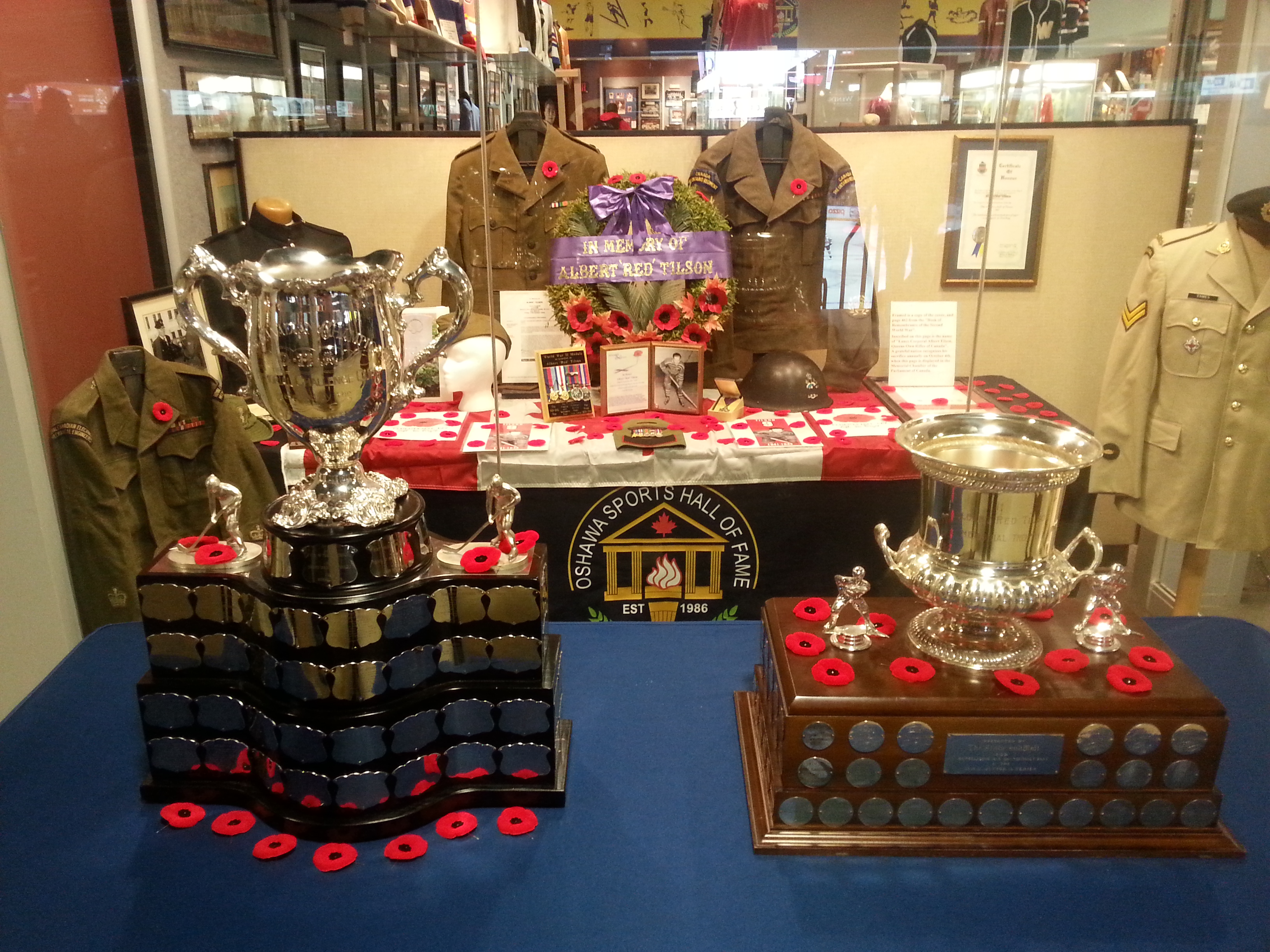
The Memorial Cup and the Red Tilson Trophy displayed at the Oshawa Sports Hall of Fame for Remembrance Day in 2019

List of winners of the Red Tilson Trophy.

Also named CHL Player of the Year

Season	Winner	Team	Goals	Assists	Points
1944–45	Doug McMurdy	St. Catharines Falcons	11	25	36
1945–46	Tod Sloan	Toronto St. Michael's Majors	43	32	75
1946–47	Ed Sandford	Toronto St. Michael's Majors	30	37	67
1947–48	George Armstrong	Stratford Kroehlers	33	40	73
1948–49	Gil Mayer	Barrie Flyers	Goalkeeper		
1949–50	George Armstrong	Toronto Marlboros	64	51	115
1950–51	Glenn Hall	Windsor Spitfires	Goalkeeper		
1951–52	Bill Harrington	Kitchener Greenshirts	Goalkeeper		
1952–53	Bob Attersley	Oshawa Generals	45	43	88
1953–54	Brian Cullen	St. Catharines Teepees	68	93	161
1954–55	Hank Ciesla	St. Catharines Teepees	57	49	106
1955–56	Ron Howell	Guelph Biltmores	21	40	61
1956–57	Frank Mahovlich	Toronto St. Michael's Majors	52	36	88
1957–58	Murray Oliver	Hamilton Tiger Cubs	34	56	90
1958–59	Stan Mikita	St. Catharines Teepees	38	59	97
1959–60	Wayne Connelly	Peterborough TPT Petes	48	34	82
1960–61	Rod Gilbert	Guelph Royals	54	49	103
1961–62	Pit Martin	Hamilton Red Wings	42	46	88
1962–63	Wayne Maxner	Niagara Falls Flyers	32	62	94
1963–64	Yvan Cournoyer	Montreal Junior Canadiens	63	48	111
1964–65	Andre Lacroix	Peterborough Petes	45	74	119
1965–66	Andre Lacroix	Peterborough Petes	40	80	120
1966–67	Mickey Redmond	Peterborough Petes	51	44	95
1967–68	Walt Tkaczuk	Kitchener Rangers	37	56	93
1968–69	Rejean Houle	Montreal Junior Canadiens	53	55	108
1969–70	Gilbert Perreault	Montreal Junior Canadiens	51	70	121
1970–71	Dave Gardner	Toronto Marlboros	56	81	137
1971–72	Don Lever	Niagara Falls Flyers	61	65	126
1972–73	Rick Middleton	Oshawa Generals	67	70	137
1973–74	Jack Valiquette	Sault Ste. Marie Greyhounds	63	72	135
1974–75	Dennis Maruk	London Knights	66	79	145
1975–76	Peter Lee	Ottawa 67's	81	80	161
1976–77	Dale McCourt	St. Catharines Fincups	60	79	139
1977–78	Bobby Smith	Ottawa 67's	69	123	192
1978–79	Mike Foligno	Sudbury Wolves	65	85	150
1979–80	Jim Fox	Ottawa 67's	65	101	166
1980–81	Ernie Godden	Windsor Spitfires	87	66	153
1981–82	Dave Simpson	London Knights	67	88	155
1982–83	Doug Gilmour	Cornwall Royals	70	107	177
1983–84	John Tucker	Kitchener Rangers	40	60	100
1984–85	Wayne Groulx	Sault Ste. Marie Greyhounds	59	85	144
1985–86	Ray Sheppard	Cornwall Royals	81	61	142
1986–87	Scott McCrory	Oshawa Generals	51	99	150
1987–88	Andrew Cassels	Ottawa 67's	48	103	151
1988–89	Bryan Fogarty	Niagara Falls Thunder	47	108	155
1989–90	Mike Ricci	Peterborough Petes	52	64	116
1990–91	Eric Lindros	Oshawa Generals	71	78	149
1991–92	Todd Simon	Niagara Falls Thunder	53	93	146
1992–93	Pat Peake	Detroit Junior Red Wings	58	78	136
1993–94	Jason Allison	London Knights	55	87	142
1994–95	David Ling	Kingston Frontenacs	61	74	135
1995–96	Alyn McCauley	Ottawa 67's	34	48	82
1996–97	Alyn McCauley	Ottawa 67's	56	56	112
1997–98	David Legwand	Plymouth Whalers	54	51	105
1998–99	Brian Campbell	Ottawa 67's	12	75	87
1999–2000	Andrew Raycroft	Kingston Frontenacs	Goalkeeper		
2000–01	Brad Boyes	Erie Otters	45	45	90
2001–02	Brad Boyes	Erie Otters	36	41	77
2002–03	Corey Locke	Ottawa 67's	63	88	151
2003–04	Corey Locke	Ottawa 67's	51	67	118
2004–05	Corey Perry	London Knights	47	83	130
2005–06	Wojtek Wolski	Brampton Battalion	47	81	128
2006–07	John Tavares	Oshawa Generals	72	62	134
2007–08	Justin Azevedo	Kitchener Rangers	43	81	124
2008–09	Cody Hodgson	Brampton Battalion	43	49	92
2009–10	Tyler Seguin	Plymouth Whalers	48	58	106
2010–11	Ryan Ellis	Windsor Spitfires	24	76	100
2011–12	Michael Houser	London Knights	Goalkeeper		
2012–13	Vincent Trocheck	Plymouth Whalers	50	59	109
2013–14	Connor Brown	Erie Otters	45	83	128
2014–15	Connor McDavid	Erie Otters	44	76	120
2015–16	Mitch Marner	London Knights	39	77	116
2016–17	Alex DeBrincat	Erie Otters	65	62	127
2017–18	Jordan Kyrou	Sarnia Sting	39	70	109
2018–19	Ukko-Pekka Luukkonen	Sudbury Wolves	Goalkeeper		
2019–20	Marco Rossi	Ottawa 67's	39	81	120
2020–21	Not awarded, season cancelled due to COVID-19 pandemic				
2021–22	Wyatt Johnston	Windsor Spitfires	46	78	124
2022–23	Matthew Maggio	Windsor Spitfires	54	57	111
2023–24	Easton Cowan	London Knights	34	62	96
2024–25	Michael Misa	Saginaw Spirit	62	72	134
2025–26	Sam O'Reilly	London/Kitchener	29	42	71

== See also ==
- Michel Brière Memorial Trophy - Quebec Maritimes Junior Hockey League Player of the Year
- Four Broncos Memorial Trophy - Western Hockey League Player of the Year
- List of Canadian Hockey League awards
