= Kevin Miehm =

Canadian ice hockey player

- Born: September 10, 1969 (age 57) Kitchener, Ontario, Canada
- Height: 6 ft 2 in (188 cm)
- Weight: 200 lb (91 kg; 14 st 4 lb)
- Position: Centre
- Shot: Left
- Played for: St. Louis Blues
- NHL draft: 54th overall, 1987; St. Louis Blues
- Playing career: 1989–2002

Kevin Miehm (born September 10, 1969) is a Canadian former ice hockey player in the National Hockey League (NHL) who played two seasons with the St. Louis Blues from 1992 to 1994. Miehm was born in Kitchener, Ontario.

== Career statistics ==
			Regular season					Playoffs
Season	Team	League	GP	G	A	Pts	PIM	GP	G	A	Pts	PIM
1985–86	Kitchener Greenshirts	MJBHL	20	20	37	57	65	—	—	—	—	—
1986–87	Oshawa Generals	OHL	61	12	27	39	19	26	1	8	9	12
1987–88	Oshawa Generals	OHL	52	16	36	52	30	7	2	5	7	0
1988–89	Oshawa Geneals	OHL	63	43	79	122	19	6	6	6	12	0
1988–89	Peoria Rivermen	IHL	3	1	1	2	0	4	0	2	2	0
1989–90	Peoria Rivermen	IHL	76	23	38	61	20	3	0	0	0	4
1990–91	Peoria Rivermen	IHL	73	25	39	64	14	16	5	7	12	2
1991–92	Peoria Rivermen	IHL	66	21	53	74	22	10	3	4	7	0
1992–93	St. Louis Blues	NHL	8	1	3	4	4	2	0	1	1	0
1992–93	Peoria Rivermen	IHL	30	12	33	45	13	4	0	1	1	2
1993–94	St. Louis Blues	NHL	14	0	1	1	4	—	—	—	—	—
1993–94	Peoria Rivermen	IHL	11	2	3	5	0	4	1	0	1	0
1994–95	Peoria Rivermen	IHL	5	1	5	6	2	—	—	—	—	—
1994–95	Fort Wayne Komets	NHL	30	10	25	35	18	4	1	4	5	0
1995–96	Fort Wayne Komets	IHL	12	2	5	7	2	—	—	—	—	—
1995–96	Michigan K-Wings	IHL	44	13	20	33	12	10	1	1	2	4
1996–97	Villacher SV	EBEL	45	32	68	100	14	—	—	—	—	—
1997–98	Villacher SV	EBEL	10	5	7	12	20	—	—	—	—	—
1997–98	HC Asiago	Italy	11	6	11	17	8	—	—	—	—	—
1998–99	HC Thurgau	NLB	16	13	17	30	2	—	—	—	—	—
1998–99	Adler Mannheim	DEL	20	4	8	12	8	12	2	4	6	6
1999–00	VEU Feldkirch	IEL	25	20	39	59	42	—	—	—	—	—
1999–00	Nürnberg Ice Tigers	DEL	17	3	17	20	14	12	2	7	9	2
2000–01	Nürnberg Ice Tigers	DEL	44	7	17	24	10	4	0	3	3	4
2001–02	Sheffield Steelers	BISL	19	9	20	29	10	—	—	—	—	—
NHL totals			22	1	4	5	8	2	0	1	1	0
IHL totals			350	110	222	332	103	55	11	19	30	14
