= 1988–89 OHL season =

Junior ice hockey season

The 1988–89 OHL season was the ninth season of the Ontario Hockey League. The Hamilton Steelhawks move to Niagara Falls becoming the Niagara Falls Thunder. The Kingston Canadians rename themselves to the Kingston Raiders. The OHL awards the inaugural Bill Long Award for distinguished service to the OHL. Fifteen teams each played 66 games. The Peterborough Petes won the J. Ross Robertson Cup, defeating the Niagara Falls Thunder.

== Relocation/Team Name Change ==
=== Hamilton Steelhawks to Niagara Falls Thunder ===

The Hamilton Steelhawks relocated their franchise to the city of Niagara Falls after four seasons in Hamilton. The club was renamed as the Niagara Falls Thunder and would play out of the Niagara Falls Memorial Arena. The Thunder would remain in the Emms Division.

This would be the first club since the Niagara Falls Flyers, who relocated to North Bay in 1982, to be based out of the city.

=== Kingston Canadians to Kingston Raiders ===
The Kingston Canadians were rebranded as the Kingston Raiders for the 1988-89 season. Kingston had used the Canadians name since they were announced as an expansion club in 1973. The club changed their colour scheme from red, blue and white to black, silver and white, effectively stealing the NFL's Los Angeles Raiders' name and color scheme.

== Regular season ==
=== Final standings ===
Note: GP = Games played; W = Wins; L = Losses; T = Ties; GF = Goals for; GA = Goals against; PTS = Points; x = clinched playoff berth; y = clinched division title

=== Leyden Division ===
Rank	Team	GP	W	L	T	PTS	GF	GA
1	y-Peterborough Petes	66	42	22	2	86	302	235
2	x-Oshawa Generals	66	36	24	6	78	337	286
3	x-Toronto Marlboros	66	32	31	3	67	319	332
4	x-Cornwall Royals	66	31	30	5	67	350	308
5	x-Ottawa 67's	66	30	32	4	64	295	301
6	x-Belleville Bulls	66	27	35	4	58	292	322
7	Kingston Raiders	66	25	36	5	55	278	313

=== Emms Division ===
Rank	Team	GP	W	L	T	PTS	GF	GA
1	y-Kitchener Rangers	66	41	19	6	88	318	251
2	x-Niagara Falls Thunder	66	41	23	2	84	410	319
3	x-London Knights	66	37	25	4	78	311	264
4	x-Guelph Platers	66	26	32	8	60	257	288
5	x-Windsor Compuware Spitfires	66	25	37	4	54	272	321
6	x-North Bay Centennials	66	24	36	6	54	282	334
7	Sudbury Wolves	66	23	36	7	53	262	334
8	Sault Ste. Marie Greyhounds	66	21	43	2	44	227	304

=== Scoring leaders ===
Player	Team	GP	G	A	Pts	PIM
Bryan Fogarty	Niagara Falls Thunder	60	47	108	155	88
Stan Drulia	Niagara Falls Thunder	47	52	93	145	59
Andrew Cassels	Ottawa 67's	56	37	97	134	66
Steve Maltais	Cornwall Royals	58	53	70	123	67
Kevin Miehm	Oshawa Generals	63	43	79	122	19
Tim Taylor	London Knights	61	34	80	114	93
Rob Zamuner	Guelph Platers	66	46	65	111	38
Keith Osborne	North Bay Centennials//Niagara Falls Thunder	65	45	64	109	57
Jamie Leach	Niagara Falls Thunder	58	45	62	107	47
Mike Ricci	Peterborough Petes	60	54	52	106	43

== Playoffs ==
Division quarterfinals
L1	Peterborough	4
L6	Belleville	1
L3	Toronto	2
L4	Cornwall	4
L2	Oshawa	2
L5	Ottawa	4
E2	Niagara Falls	4
E5	Windsor	0
E3	London	4
E4	Guelph	3
E1	Kitchener	1
E6	North Bay	4

Quarterfinals
L1	Peterborough	bye
L4	Cornwall	4
L5	Ottawa	2
E2	Niagara Falls	bye
E3	London	4
E6	North Bay	3

Semifinals
L1	Peterborough	4
L4	Cornwall	2
E2	Niagara Falls	4
E3	London	3

Finals
L1	Peterborough	4
E2	Niagara Falls	2

=== Division quarter-finals ===
==== Leyden Division ====
===== (1) Peterborough Petes vs. (6) Belleville Bulls =====
March 20	Belleville Bulls	3 – 2	Peterborough Petes	Peterborough Memorial Centre

March 22	Peterborough Petes	3 – 1	Belleville Bulls	Yardmen Arena

March 23	Belleville Bulls	3 – 9	Peterborough Petes	Peterborough Memorial Centre

March 25	Peterborough Petes	5 – 4	Belleville Bulls	Yardmen Arena

March 26	Belleville Bulls	4 – 6	Peterborough Petes	Peterborough Memorial Centre

Peterborough wins series 4 – 1

===== (2) Oshawa Generals vs. (5) Ottawa 67's =====
March 19	Ottawa 67's	4 – 2	Oshawa Generals	Oshawa Civic Auditorium

March 21	Oshawa Generals	4 – 5	Ottawa 67's	Ottawa Civic Centre

March 22	Oshawa Generals	3 – 4	Ottawa 67's	Ottawa Civic Centre

March 24	Ottawa 67's	0 – 4	Oshawa Generals	Oshawa Civic Auditorium

March 26	Ottawa 67's	4 – 5	OT	Oshawa Generals	Oshawa Civic Auditorium

March 28	Oshawa Generals	5 – 6	OT	Ottawa 67's	Ottawa Civic Centre

Ottawa wins series 4 – 2

===== (3) Toronto Marlboros vs. (4) Cornwall Royals =====
March 19	Cornwall Royals	6 – 2	Toronto Marlboros	Maple Leaf Gardens

March 21	Cornwall Royals	3 – 4	Toronto Marlboros	Maple Leaf Gardens

March 23	Toronto Marlboros	4 – 5	Cornwall Royals	Cornwall Civic Complex

March 24	Toronto Marlboros	6 – 4	Cornwall Royals	Cornwall Civic Complex

March 26	Cornwall Royals	8 – 5	Toronto Marlboros	Maple Leaf Gardens

March 27	Toronto Marlboros	3 – 12	Cornwall Royals	Cornwall Civic Complex

Cornwall wins series 4 – 2

==== Emms Division ====
===== (1) Kitchener Rangers vs. (6) North Bay Centennials =====
March 19	North Bay Centennials	2 – 3	Kitchener Rangers	Kitchener Memorial Auditorium

March 21	Kitchener Rangers	1 – 12	North Bay Centennials	North Bay Memorial Gardens

March 24	North Bay Centennials	5 – 4	OT	Kitchener Rangers	Kitchener Memorial Auditorium

March 25	Kitchener Rangers	2 – 4	North Bay Centennials	North Bay Memorial Gardens

March 26	North Bay Centennials	3 – 2	Kitchener Rangers	Kitchener Memorial Auditorium

North Bay wins series 4 – 1

===== (2) Niagara Falls Thunder vs. (5) Windsor Compuware Spitfires =====
March 19	Windsor Compuware Spitfires	5 – 8	Niagara Falls Thunder	Niagara Falls Memorial Arena

March 21	Niagara Falls Thunder	7 – 6	Windsor Compuware Spitfires	Windsor Arena

March 23	Windsor Compuware Spitfires	3 – 9	Niagara Falls Thunder	Niagara Falls Memorial Arena

March 24	Niagara Falls Thunder	6 – 3	Windsor Compuware Spitfires	Windsor Arena

Niagara Falls wins series 4 – 0

===== (3) London Knights vs. (4) Guelph Platers =====
March 19	Guelph Platers	2 – 4	London Knights	London Gardens

March 20	London Knights	6 – 5	OT	Guelph Platers	Guelph Memorial Gardens

March 22	Guelph Platers	2 – 5	London Knights	London Gardens

March 23	London Knights	4 – 11	Guelph Platers	Guelph Memorial Gardens

March 26	Guelph Platers	7 – 5	London Knights	London Gardens

March 28	London Knights	2 – 4	Guelph Platers	Guelph Memorial Gardens

March 29	Guelph Platers	1 – 5	London Knights	London Gardens

London wins series 4 – 3

=== Division semi-finals ===
==== Leyden Division ====
===== (4) Cornwall Royals vs. (5) Ottawa 67's =====
March 30	Ottawa 67's	0 – 7	Cornwall Royals	Cornwall Civic Complex

March 31	Cornwall Royals	3 – 4	Ottawa 67's	Ottawa Civic Centre

April 3	Ottawa 67's	4 – 8	Cornwall Royals	Cornwall Civic Complex

April 4	Cornwall Royals	2 – 4	Ottawa 67's	Ottawa Civic Centre

April 6	Ottawa 67's	2 – 4	Cornwall Royals	Cornwall Civic Complex

April 7	Cornwall Royals	5 – 3	Ottawa 67's	Ottawa Civic Centre

Cornwall wins series 4 – 2

==== Emms Division ====
===== (3) London Knights vs. (6) North Bay Centennials =====
March 31	North Bay Centennials	3 – 6	London Knights	London Gardens

April 2	London Knights	2 – 5	North Bay Centennials	North Bay Memorial Gardens

April 3	North Bay Centennials	3 – 6	London Knights	London Gardens

April 5	London Knights	2 – 6	North Bay Centennials	North Bay Memorial Gardens

April 6	North Bay Centennials	3 – 5	London Knights	London Gardens

April 9	London Knights	2 – 6	North Bay Centennials	North Bay Memorial Gardens

April 10	North Bay Centennials	2 – 7	London Knights	London Gardens

London wins series 4 – 3

=== Division finals ===
==== Leyden Division ====
===== (1) Peterborough Petes vs. (4) Cornwall Royals =====
April 12	Cornwall Royals	8 – 3	Peterborough Petes	Peterborough Memorial Centre

April 14	Peterborough Petes	3 – 5	Cornwall Royals	Cornwall Civic Complex

April 17	Cornwall Royals	2 – 4	Peterborough Petes	Peterborough Memorial Centre

April 18	Peterborough Petes	5 – 4	Cornwall Royals	Cornwall Civic Complex

April 20	Cornwall Royals	3 – 5	Peterborough Petes	Peterborough Memorial Centre

April 21	Peterborough Petes	5 – 3	Cornwall Royals	Cornwall Civic Complex

Peterborough wins series 4 – 2

==== Emms Division ====
===== (2) Niagara Falls Thunder vs. (3) London Knights =====
April 11	London Knights	5 – 8	Niagara Falls Thunder	Niagara Falls Memorial Arena

April 14	Niagara Falls Thunder	5 – 8	London Knights	London Gardens

April 15	London Knights	3 – 6	Niagara Falls Thunder	Niagara Falls Memorial Arena

April 18	Niagara Falls Thunder	3 – 6	London Knights	London Gardens

April 19	London Knights	5 – 2	Niagara Falls Thunder	Niagara Falls Memorial Arena

April 21	Niagara Falls Thunder	7 – 3	London Knights	London Gardens

April 22	London Knights	4 – 5	Niagara Falls Thunder	Niagara Falls Memorial Arena

Niagara Falls wins series 4 – 3

=== J. Ross Robertson Cup ===
==== (L1) Peterborough Petes vs. (E2) Niagara Falls Thunder ====
April 24	Niagara Falls Thunder	1 – 3	Peterborough Petes	Peterborough Memorial Centre

April 25	Peterborough Petes	4 – 6	Niagara Falls Thunder	Niagara Falls Memorial Arena

April 27	Niagara Falls Thunder	3 – 11	Peterborough Petes	Peterborough Memorial Centre

April 28	Peterborough Petes	1 – 3	Niagara Falls Thunder	Niagara Falls Memorial Arena

April 30	Niagara Falls Thunder	4 – 6	Peterborough Petes	Peterborough Memorial Centre

May 1	Peterborough Petes	8 – 2	Niagara Falls Thunder	Niagara Falls Memorial Arena

Peterborough wins series 4 – 2

== Awards ==
J. Ross Robertson Cup:	Peterborough Petes
Hamilton Spectator Trophy:	Kitchener Rangers
Leyden Trophy:	Peterborough Petes
Emms Trophy:	Kitchener Rangers
Red Tilson Trophy:	Bryan Fogarty, Niagara Falls Thunder
Eddie Powers Memorial Trophy:	Bryan Fogarty, Niagara Falls Thunder
Matt Leyden Trophy:	Joe McDonell, Kitchener Rangers
Jim Mahon Memorial Trophy:	Stan Drulia, Niagara Falls Thunder
Max Kaminsky Trophy:	Bryan Fogarty, Niagara Falls Thunder
OHL Goaltender of the Year:	Gus Morschauser, Kitchener Rangers
Jack Ferguson Award:	Eric Lindros, Sault Ste. Marie Greyhounds
Dave Pinkney Trophy:	John Tanner and Todd Bojcun, Peterborough Petes
Emms Family Award:	Owen Nolan, Cornwall Royals
F.W. 'Dinty' Moore Trophy:	Jeff Wilson, Kingston Raiders
William Hanley Trophy:	Kevin Miehm, Oshawa Generals
Leo Lalonde Memorial Trophy:	Stan Drulia, Niagara Falls Thunder
Bobby Smith Trophy:	Brian Collinson, Toronto Marlboros
Bill Long Award:	Alec Campagnaro, Guelph Platers & Earl Montagano, Ottawa 67's

== 1989 OHL Priority Selection ==
The Sault Ste. Marie Greyhounds held the first overall pick in the 1989 Ontario Priority Selection and selected Eric Lindros from the St. Michael's Buzzers. Lindros was awarded the Jack Ferguson Award, awarded to the top pick in the draft.

Below are the players who were selected in the first round of the 1989 Ontario Hockey League Priority Selection.

#	Player	Nationality	OHL Team	Hometown	Minor Team
1	Eric Lindros (C)	Canada	Sault Ste. Marie Greyhounds	London, Ontario	St. Michael's Buzzers
2	Jamie Matthews (C)	Canada	Sudbury Wolves	Amherst, Nova Scotia	Amherst Ramblers
3	Dave Stewart (D)	Canada	Kingston Frontenacs	Norwood, Ontario	Waterloo Siskins
4	Jamie Caruso (RW)	Canada	North Bay Centennials	Bramalea, Ontario	Bramalea Blues
5	Ryan Merritt (LW)	Canada	Windsor Spitfires	Cottam, Ontario	Waterloo Siskins
6	Brent Gretzky (C)	Canada	Belleville Bulls	Brantford, Ontario	Brantford Classics
7	Trent Cull (D)	Canada	Guelph Platers	Georgetown, Ontario	Georgetown Gemini
8	Ryan Kuwabara (RW)	Canada	Ottawa 67's	Hamilton, Ontario	Hamilton Kilty B's
9	Rod Pasma (D)	Canada	Cornwall Royals	Georgetown, Ontario	Georgetown Gemini
10	Alek Stojanov (RW)	Canada	Hamilton Dukes	Windsor, Ontario	Windsor Midgets
11	Wade Simpson (D)	Canada	Oshawa Generals	Navan, Ontario	Nepean Raiders
12	Greg Ryan (D)	Canada	London Knights	Burlington, Ontario	Burlington Cougars
13	Ken Ruddick (RW)	Canada	Niagara Falls Thunder	Hamilton, Ontario	Hamilton Huskies
14	Dale McTavish (C)	Canada	Peterborough Petes	Eganville, Ontario	Pembroke Lumber Kings
15	Jack Williams (RW)	United States	Kitchener Rangers	Greensburg, Pennsylvania	Chicago Young Americans

== See also ==
- List of OHA Junior A standings
- List of OHL seasons
- 1989 Memorial Cup
- 1989 NHL entry draft
- 1988 in sports
- 1989 in sports

Preceded by 1987–88 OHL season	OHL seasons	Succeeded by 1989–90 OHL season
