= Niagara Falls Memorial Arena =

Former Canadian indoor ice hockey arena

Coordinates: 43.094653°N 79.079053°W

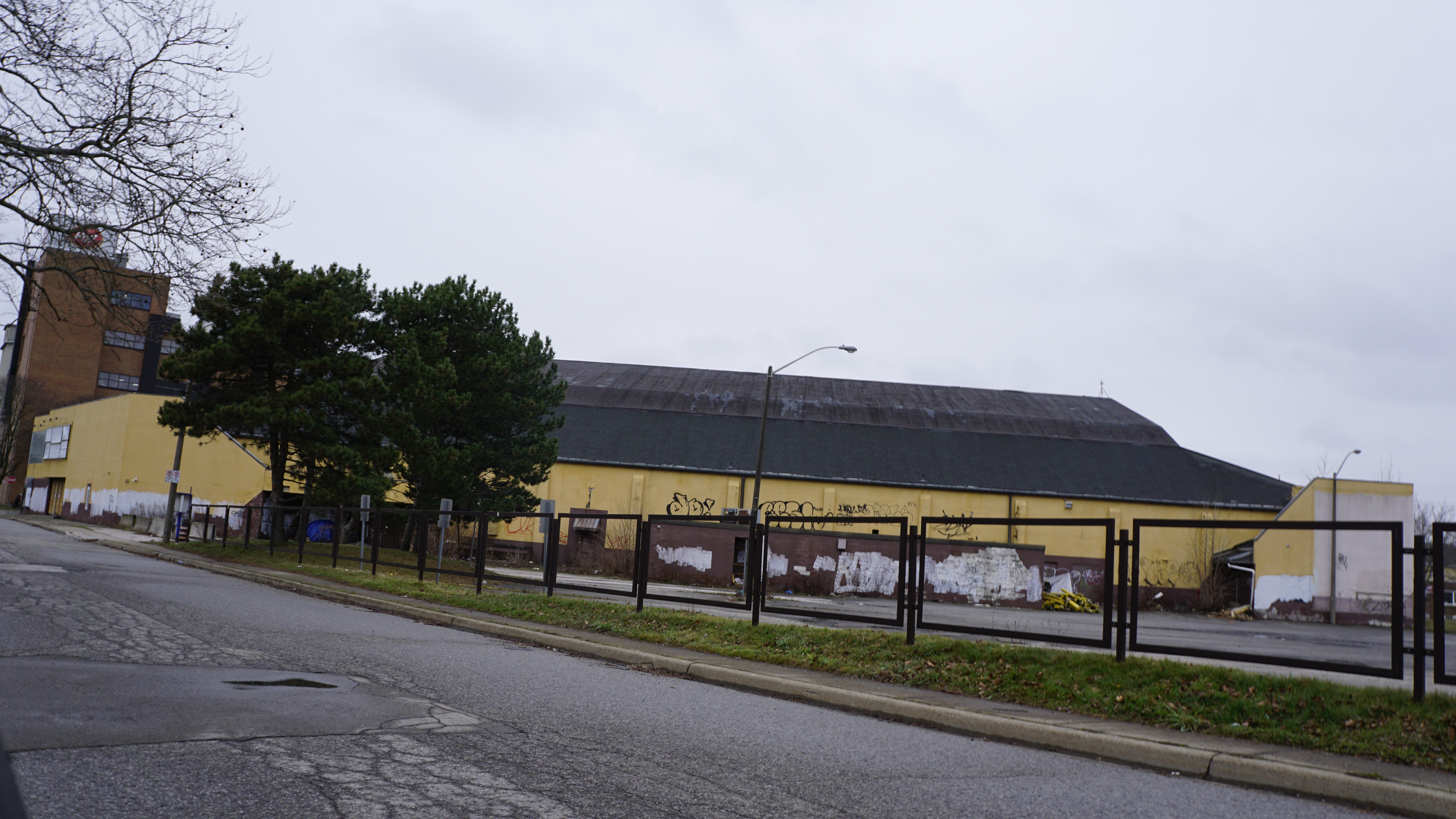
- Arena in 2024
- Interactive map of Niagara Falls Memorial Arena
- Address: Niagara Falls, Ontario
- Capacity: 3,633

Construction
- Opened: 1950
- Renovated: 1986
- Closed: 2010
- Demolished: 2024

Tenants
- Niagara Falls Flyers (OHL) (1960–1972, 1976–1982); Niagara Falls Thunder (OHL) (1988–1996); Niagara Falls Canucks (GOJHL) (1971–2010)

The Niagara Falls Memorial Arena was an ice arena located in Niagara Falls, Ontario, Canada. Built in 1950, it served as the home of several junior ice hockey teams, including the Niagara Falls Flyers, Niagara Falls Thunder, and Niagara Falls Canucks. It was later purchased and converted into a museum, known as the Sand Sculpture Exhibition. The arena was demolished in July 2024.

== History ==
Built in 1950, the arena was home to various ice hockey teams, including the Niagara Falls Thunder and the Niagara Falls Flyers. It also served as the home of the Niagara Falls Canucks, a team in the Greater Ontario Junior B Hockey League. The Memorial Arena hosted four of the five games played in the 1968 Memorial Cup won by the Flyers on home ice.

The arena closed in 2010, when replaced by the Gale Centre. Plans were for the arena to be demolished for a parking lot, due to significant repairs needed. The arena was purchased in 2012, by Russian company V2 Niagara which converted it into a sand sculpture museum. The renovation cost $3 million and took two years to complete. The owners fell into financial difficulties and put the building up for sale for $2 million in 2014, later reducing the price to $1.7 million. The building was subsequently abandoned and fell into disrepair. An urban explorer recorded significant evidence of drug use and homeless populations in the building.

A few years later, the mayor of Niagara Falls expressed interest in tracking down the owners to the property, and asking them to renovate it or sell it. No changes were made to the property and it remained abandoned.

In Summer 2024, the arena was demolished. The mayor gave tributes to the arena, and noted that the arena grounds "can be redeveloped into something that goes within the zoning of the neighborhood".
