= Jason MacDonald (ice hockey) =

Canadian ice hockey player (born 1974)

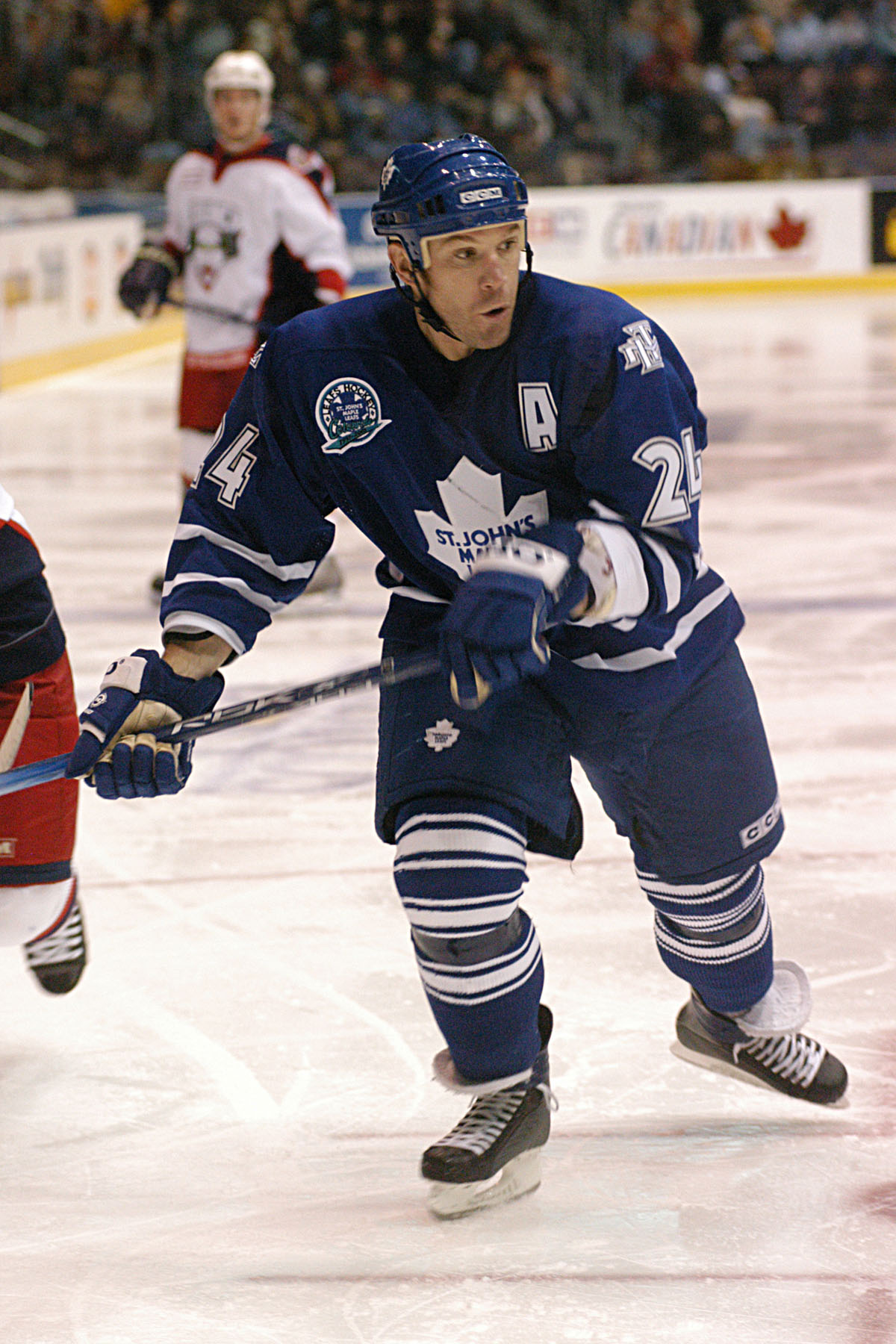
- MacDonald with the St. John's Maple Leafs in 2004
- Born: April 1, 1974 (age 51) Charlottetown, Prince Edward Island, Canada
- Height: 5 ft 11 in (180 cm)
- Weight: 210 lb (95 kg; 15 st 0 lb)
- Position: Right Wing
- Shot: Right
- Played for: New York Rangers
- National team: Canada
- NHL draft: 142nd overall, 1992; Detroit Red Wings
- Playing career: 1994–2006

Jason MacDonald (born April 1, 1974) is a Canadian former professional ice hockey winger. He played 4 games in the National Hockey League with the New York Rangers during the 2003–04 season. The rest of his career, which lasted from 1994 to 2006, was mainly spent in the minor league, where he served at one point as the captain of the Wilkes-Barre/Scranton Penguins.

== Career statistics ==
=== Regular season and playoffs ===
			Regular season					Playoffs
Season	Team	League	GP	G	A	Pts	PIM	GP	G	A	Pts	PIM
1989–90	Charlottetown Abbies	IJHL	29	11	29	40	206	—	—	—	—	—
1990–91	North Bay Centennials	OHL	57	12	15	27	126	10	3	3	6	15
1991–92	North Bay Centennials	OHL	17	5	8	13	50	—	—	—	—	—
1991–92	Owen Sound Platers	OHL	42	17	19	36	129	5	0	2	2	8
1992–93	Owen Sound Platers	OHL	56	46	43	89	197	8	6	5	11	28
1993–94	Owen Sound Platers	OHL	66	55	61	116	177	9	7	11	18	36
1993–94	Adirondack Red Wings	AHL	—	—	—	—	—	1	0	0	0	0
1994–95	Adirondack Red Wings	AHL	68	14	21	35	238	4	0	0	0	2
1995–96	Toledo Storm	ECHL	9	5	5	10	26	9	3	1	4	39
1995–96	Adirondack Red Wings	AHL	43	9	13	22	99	—	—	—	—	—
1996–97	Adirondack Red Wings	AHL	1	0	0	0	2	—	—	—	—	—
1996–97	Fredericton Canadiens	AHL	63	22	25	47	189	—	—	—	—	—
1997–98	Saint John Flames	AHL	6	2	0	2	27	11	1	3	4	17
1997–98	Canadian National Team	Intl	51	15	20	35	133	—	—	—	—	—
1998–99	Manitoba Moose	IHL	82	25	27	52	283	5	2	2	4	13
1999–00	Manitoba Moose	IHL	30	5	10	15	77	—	—	—	—	—
1999–00	Orlando Solar Bears	IHL	29	7	7	14	113	4	0	0	0	19
2000–01	Wilkes-Barre/Scranton Penguins	AHL	74	17	16	33	290	17	1	3	4	66
2001–02	Wilkes-Barre/Scranton Penguins	AHL	57	8	13	21	330	—	—	—	—	—
2002–03	Wilkes-Barre/Scranton Penguins	AHL	56	4	7	11	137	1	0	0	0	0
2003–04	New York Rangers	NHL	4	0	0	0	19	—	—	—	—	—
2003–04	Hartford Wolf Pack	AHL	41	11	11	22	101	10	4	0	4	50
2004–05	St. John's Maple Leafs	AHL	29	4	8	12	152	5	2	0	2	27
2005–06	Providence Bruins	AHL	74	13	15	28	132	5	2	0	2	38
NHL totals			512	104	129	233	1697	54	10	6	16	200
NHL totals			4	0	0	0	19	—	—	—	—	—

Awards and achievements
Preceded by Sven Butenschon; John Slaney	Captain of the Wilkes-Barre/Scranton Penguins; 2001-02	Succeeded by Tom Kostopoulos
