= 1991–92 OHL season =

Junior ice hockey season

The 1991–92 OHL season was the 12th season of the Ontario Hockey League. The Dukes of Hamilton relocated, and became the Guelph Storm. Sixteen teams each played 66 games. The Sault Ste. Marie Greyhounds won the J. Ross Robertson Cup, defeating the North Bay Centennials.

== Relocation ==
=== Hamilton Dukes to Guelph Storm ===
The Hamilton Dukes relocated to the city of Guelph after two seasons in Hamilton. The club would be renamed to the Guelph Storm and play at the Guelph Memorial Gardens. Guelph had previously hosted an OHL franchise from 1982-1989, the Guelph Platers. The Platers won the 1986 Memorial Cup. The franchise relocated to Owen Sound following the 1988-89 season.

The Storm would remain in the Emms Division.

== New Arena ==
=== Detroit Compuware Ambassadors ===
The Detroit Compuware Ambassadors moved into Joe Louis Arena following one season of play at Cobo Arena. This arena was also the home of the Detroit Red Wings of the National Hockey League.

== Regular season ==
=== Final standings ===
Note: DIV = Division; GP = Games played; W = Wins; L = Losses; T = Ties; GF = Goals for; GA = Goals against; PTS = Points; x = clinched playoff berth; y = clinched division title

=== Leyden Division ===
| Rank | Team | GP | W | L | T | PTS | GF | GA |
|---|---|---|---|---|---|---|---|---|
| 1 | y-Peterborough Petes | 66 | 41 | 18 | 7 | 89 | 319 | 256 |
| 2 | x-North Bay Centennials | 66 | 40 | 21 | 5 | 85 | 323 | 259 |
| 3 | x-Cornwall Royals | 66 | 38 | 22 | 6 | 82 | 328 | 289 |
| 4 | x-Sudbury Wolves | 66 | 33 | 27 | 6 | 72 | 331 | 320 |
| 5 | x-Oshawa Generals | 66 | 31 | 26 | 9 | 71 | 274 | 273 |
| 6 | x-Ottawa 67's | 66 | 32 | 30 | 4 | 68 | 280 | 251 |
| 7 | x-Belleville Bulls | 66 | 27 | 27 | 12 | 66 | 314 | 293 |
| 8 | Kingston Frontenacs | 66 | 16 | 44 | 6 | 38 | 241 | 316 |

=== Emms Division ===
| Rank | Team | GP | W | L | T | PTS | GF | GA |
|---|---|---|---|---|---|---|---|---|
| 1 | y-Sault Ste. Marie Greyhounds | 66 | 41 | 19 | 6 | 88 | 335 | 229 |
| 2 | x-Niagara Falls Thunder | 66 | 39 | 23 | 4 | 82 | 307 | 254 |
| 3 | x-London Knights | 66 | 37 | 25 | 4 | 78 | 310 | 280 |
| 4 | x-Kitchener Rangers | 66 | 29 | 30 | 7 | 65 | 283 | 282 |
| 5 | x-Windsor Spitfires | 66 | 25 | 33 | 8 | 58 | 272 | 316 |
| 6 | x-Owen Sound Platers | 66 | 23 | 41 | 2 | 48 | 260 | 315 |
| 7 | x-Detroit Compuware Ambassadors | 66 | 23 | 42 | 1 | 47 | 279 | 353 |
| 8 | Guelph Storm | 66 | 4 | 51 | 11 | 19 | 235 | 425 |

=== Scoring leaders ===
| Player | Team | GP | G | A | Pts | PIM |
|---|---|---|---|---|---|---|
| Todd Simon | Niagara Falls Thunder | 66 | 53 | 93 | 146 | 70 |
| Brett Seguin | Ottawa 67's | 64 | 34 | 100 | 134 | 70 |
| John Spoltore | North Bay Centennials | 66 | 47 | 84 | 131 | 31 |
| Darren McCarty | Belleville Bulls | 65 | 55 | 72 | 127 | 177 |
| Chris Taylor | London Knights | 66 | 48 | 74 | 122 | 57 |
| Brent Gretzky | Belleville Bulls | 62 | 43 | 78 | 121 | 37 |
| Ralph Intranuovo | Sault Ste. Marie Greyhounds | 65 | 50 | 63 | 113 | 44 |
| Jake Grimes | Belleville Bulls | 66 | 44 | 69 | 113 | 18 |
| Colin Miller | Sault Ste. Marie Greyhounds | 66 | 37 | 73 | 110 | 52 |
| Jason Dawe | Peterborough Petes | 66 | 53 | 55 | 108 | 55 |

== Playoffs ==
Division quarterfinals
L1 | Peterborough | bye
L3 | Cornwall | 2
L6 | Ottawa | 4
L4 | Sudbury | 4
L5 | Oshawa | 3
L7 | Belleville | 1
L2 | North Bay | 4
E1 | S.S. Marie | bye
E4 | Kitchener | 4
E5 | Windsor | 3
E3 | London | 4
E6 | Owen Sound | 1
E7 | Detroit | 3
E2 | Niagara Falls | 4

Quarterfinals
L1 | Peterborough | 4
L6 | Ottawa | 1
L4 | Sudbury | 0
L2 | North Bay | 4
E1 | S.S. Marie | 4
E4 | Kitchener | 3
E3 | London | 1
E2 | Niagara Falls | 4

Semifinals
L1 | Peterborough | 1
L2 | North Bay | 4
E1 | S.S. Marie | 4
E2 | Niagara Falls | 1

Finals
L2 | North Bay | 3
E1 | S.S. Marie | 4

=== Division quarter-finals ===
==== Leyden Division ====
===== (2) North Bay Centennials vs. (7) Belleville Bulls =====
| March 15 | Belleville Bulls | 3 – 9 | North Bay Centennials | North Bay Memorial Gardens |

| March 17 | North Bay Centennials | 7 – 4 | Belleville Bulls | Yardmen Arena |

| March 19 | Belleville Bulls | 1 – 4 | North Bay Centennials | North Bay Memorial Gardens |

| March 21 | North Bay Centennials | 5 – 6 | Belleville Bulls | Yardmen Arena |

| March 22 | Belleville Bulls | 4 – 6 | North Bay Centennials | North Bay Memorial Gardens |

| North Bay wins series 4 – 1 |

===== (3) Cornwall Royals vs. (6) Ottawa 67's =====
| March 15 | Ottawa 67's | 7 – 4 | Cornwall Royals | Cornwall Civic Complex |

| March 17 | Cornwall Royals | 5 – 4 | OT | Ottawa 67's | Ottawa Civic Centre |

| March 19 | Ottawa 67's | 7 – 5 | Cornwall Royals | Cornwall Civic Complex |

| March 20 | Cornwall Royals | 2 – 1 | OT | Ottawa 67's | Ottawa Civic Centre |

| March 22 | Ottawa 67's | 7 – 3 | Cornwall Royals | Cornwall Civic Complex |

| March 24 | Cornwall Royals | 3 – 5 | Ottawa 67's | Ottawa Civic Centre |

| Ottawa wins series 4 – 2 |

===== (4) Sudbury Wolves vs. (5) Oshawa Generals =====
| March 16 | Oshawa Generals | 4 – 3 | Sudbury Wolves | Sudbury Community Arena |

| March 18 | Sudbury Wolves | 3 – 6 | Oshawa Generals | Oshawa Civic Auditorium |

| March 20 | Oshawa Generals | 2 – 5 | Sudbury Wolves | Sudbury Community Arena |

| March 22 | Sudbury Wolves | 3 – 4 | OT | Oshawa Generals | Oshawa Civic Auditorium |

| March 23 | Oshawa Generals | 2 – 5 | Sudbury Wolves | Sudbury Community Arena |

| March 24 | Sudbury Wolves | 5 – 1 | Oshawa Generals | Oshawa Civic Auditorium |

| March 26 | Oshawa Generals | 1 – 2 | OT | Sudbury Wolves | Sudbury Community Arena |

| Sudbury wins series 4 – 3 |

==== Emms Division ====
===== (2) Niagara Falls Thunder vs. (7) Detroit Compuware Ambassadors =====
| March 14 | Detroit Compuware Ambassadors | 5 – 3 | Niagara Falls Thunder | Niagara Falls Memorial Arena |

| March 15 | Niagara Falls Thunder | 3 – 4 | Detroit Compuware Ambassadors | Joe Louis Arena |

| March 17 | Detroit Compuware Ambassadors | 6 – 8 | Niagara Falls Thunder | Niagara Falls Memorial Arena |

| March 19 | Niagara Falls Thunder | 3 – 5 | Detroit Compuware Ambassadors | Joe Louis Arena |

| March 21 | Detroit Compuware Ambassadors | 3 – 6 | Niagara Falls Thunder | Niagara Falls Memorial Arena |

| March 23 | Niagara Falls Thunder | 8 – 3 | Detroit Compuware Ambassadors | Joe Louis Arena |

| March 25 | Detroit Compuware Ambassadors | 2 – 7 | Niagara Falls Thunder | Niagara Falls Memorial Arena |

| Niagara Falls wins series 4 – 3 |

===== (3) London Knights vs. (6) Owen Sound Platers =====
| March 15 | Owen Sound Platers | 4 – 3 | OT | London Knights | London Gardens |

| March 18 | London Knights | 8 – 3 | Owen Sound Platers | Bayshore Community Centre |

| March 20 | Owen Sound Platers | 4 – 6 | London Knights | London Gardens |

| March 21 | London Knights | 7 – 5 | Owen Sound Platers | Bayshore Community Centre |

| March 23 | Owen Sound Platers | 1 – 4 | London Knights | London Gardens |

| London wins series 4 – 1 |

===== (4) Kitchener Rangers vs. (5) Windsor Spitfires =====
| March 15 | Windsor Spitfires | 2 – 3 | OT | Kitchener Rangers | Kitchener Memorial Auditorium |

| March 19 | Kitchener Rangers | 5 – 6 | OT | Windsor Spitfires | Windsor Arena |

| March 20 | Windsor Spitfires | 3 – 4 | OT | Kitchener Rangers | Kitchener Memorial Auditorium |

| March 22 | Kitchener Rangers | 3 – 1 | Windsor Spitfires | Windsor Arena |

| March 24 | Windsor Spitfires | 3 – 2 | Kitchener Rangers | Kitchener Memorial Auditorium |

| March 25 | Kitchener Rangers | 0 – 2 | Windsor Spitfires | Windsor Arena |

| March 26 | Windsor Spitfires | 2 – 5 | Kitchener Rangers | Kitchener Memorial Auditorium |

| Kitchener wins series 4 – 3 |

=== Division semi-finals ===
==== Leyden Division ====
===== (1) Peterborough Petes vs. (6) Ottawa 67's =====
| March 27 | Peterborough Petes | 4 – 1 | Ottawa 67's | Ottawa Civic Centre |

| March 29 | Ottawa 67's | 2 – 4 | Peterborough Petes | Peterborough Memorial Centre |

| April 2 | Ottawa 67's | 1 – 3 | Peterborough Petes | Peterborough Memorial Centre |

| April 3 | Peterborough Petes | 3 – 6 | Ottawa 67's | Ottawa Civic Centre |

| April 5 | Ottawa 67's | 1 – 3 | Peterborough Petes | Peterborough Memorial Centre |

| Peterborough wins series 4 – 1 |

===== (2) North Bay Centennials vs. (4) Sudbury Wolves =====
| March 29 | Sudbury Wolves | 1 – 5 | North Bay Centennials | North Bay Memorial Gardens |

| March 31 | North Bay Centennials | 4 – 3 | Sudbury Wolves | Sudbury Community Arena |

| April 2 | Sudbury Wolves | 1 – 7 | North Bay Centennials | North Bay Memorial Gardens |

| April 4 | North Bay Centennials | 3 – 0 | Sudbury Wolves | Sudbury Community Arena |

| North Bay wins series 4 – 0 |

==== Emms Division ====
===== (1) Sault Ste. Marie Greyhounds vs. (4) Kitchener Rangers =====
| March 28 | Kitchener Rangers | 4 – 3 | Sault Ste. Marie Greyhounds | Sault Memorial Gardens |

| March 29 | Kitchener Rangers | 4 – 5 | OT | Sault Ste. Marie Greyhounds | Sault Memorial Gardens |

| April 2 | Sault Ste. Marie Greyhounds | 3 – 4 | OT | Kitchener Rangers | Kitchener Memorial Auditorium |

| April 3 | Sault Ste. Marie Greyhounds | 3 – 0 | Kitchener Rangers | Kitchener Memorial Auditorium |

| April 5 | Kitchener Rangers | 1 – 7 | Sault Ste. Marie Greyhounds | Sault Memorial Gardens |

| April 7 | Sault Ste. Marie Greyhounds | 2 – 4 | Kitchener Rangers | Kitchener Memorial Auditorium |

| April 9 | Kitchener Rangers | 1 – 7 | Sault Ste. Marie Greyhounds | Sault Memorial Gardens |

| Sault Ste. Marie wins series 4 – 3 |

===== (2) Niagara Falls Thunder vs. (3) London Knights =====
| March 28 | London Knights | 3 – 4 | OT | Niagara Falls Thunder | Niagara Falls Memorial Arena |

| March 29 | Niagara Falls Thunder | 4 – 3 | London Knights | London Gardens |

| April 1 | London Knights | 4 – 5 | OT | Niagara Falls Thunder | Niagara Falls Memorial Arena |

| April 3 | Niagara Falls Thunder | 2 – 4 | London Knights | London Gardens |

| April 4 | London Knights | 1 – 5 | Niagara Falls Thunder | Niagara Falls Memorial Arena |

| Niagara Falls wins series 4 – 1 |

=== Division finals ===
==== (1) Peterborough Petes vs. (2) North Bay Centennials ====
| April 9 | North Bay Centennials | 4 – 3 | OT | Peterborough Petes | Peterborough Memorial Centre |

| April 12 | Peterborough Petes | 2 – 12 | North Bay Centennials | North Bay Memorial Gardens |

| April 14 | North Bay Centennials | 2 – 4 | Peterborough Petes | Peterborough Memorial Centre |

| April 16 | Peterborough Petes | 2 – 6 | North Bay Centennials | North Bay Memorial Gardens |

| April 18 | North Bay Centennials | 5 – 3 | Peterborough Petes | Peterborough Memorial Centre |

| North Bay wins series 4 – 1 |

==== Emms Division ====
===== (1) Sault Ste. Marie Greyhounds vs. (2) Niagara Falls Thunder =====
| April 11 | Niagara Falls Thunder | 8 – 7 | Sault Ste. Marie Greyhounds | Sault Memorial Gardens |

| April 12 | Niagara Falls Thunder | 2 – 7 | Sault Ste. Marie Greyhounds | Sault Memorial Gardens |

| April 15 | Sault Ste. Marie Greyhounds | 7 – 5 | Niagara Falls Thunder | Niagara Falls Memorial Arena |

| April 16 | Sault Ste. Marie Greyhounds | 4 – 3 | Niagara Falls Thunder | Niagara Falls Memorial Arena |

| April 19 | Niagara Falls Thunder | 1 – 7 | Sault Ste. Marie Greyhounds | Sault Memorial Gardens |

| Sault Ste. Marie wins series 4 – 1 |

=== J. Ross Robertson Cup ===
==== (E1) Sault Ste. Marie Greyhounds vs. (L2) North Bay Centennials ====
| April 23 | North Bay Centennials | 2 – 7 | Sault Ste. Marie Greyhounds | Sault Memorial Gardens |
| No scoring | | First period | Tony Iob (14) - 10:57; Rick Kowalsky (5) - 14:18 |
| No scoring | | Second period | Colin Miller (7) - 18:47 |
| John Spoltore (11) - pp - 13:02; Mark Lawrence (18) - pp - 13:20 | | Third period | Tom MacDonald (3) - 3:29; Drew Bannister (2) - pp - 7:11; Aaron Gavey (5) - 10:58; Tony Iob (15) - 18:10 |
| Ron Bertrand and Sandy Allan (took over for Bertrand after the sixth goal) - 32 saves/39 shots | | Goalie stats | Kevin Hodson - 35 saves/37 shots |

| April 26 | Sault Ste. Marie Greyhounds | 3 – 4 | North Bay Centennials | North Bay Memorial Gardens |
| No scoring | | First period | John Spoltore (12) - pp - 4:23; Drake Berehowsky (7) - 8:01; Jason Firth (7) - 12:52 |
| No scoring | | Second period | No scoring |
| Chris Simon (4) - 1:55; Chris Simon (5) - 14:21; Ralph Intranuovo (9) - 15:55 | | Third period | Chad Penney (11) - pp - 11:26 |
| Kevin Hodson - 30 saves/33 shots | | Goalie stats | Ron Bertrand - 35 saves/39 shots |

| April 28 | North Bay Centennials | 2 – 4 | Sault Ste. Marie Greyhounds | Sault Memorial Gardens |
| Chad Penney (12) - 9:47 | | First period | Ralph Intranuovo (10) - pp - 14:33; Shaun Imber (4) - pp - 19:09 |
| Jeff Shevalier (5) - 2:25 | | Second period | Colin Miller (8) - 4:33 |
| No scoring | | Third period | Colin Miller (9) - en - 18:45 |
| Ron Bertrand - 32 saves/35 shots | | Goalie stats | Kevin Hodson - 34 saves/36 shots |

| April 30 | Sault Ste. Marie Greyhounds | 1 – 4 | North Bay Centennials | North Bay Memorial Gardens |
| No scoring | | First period | Mark Lawrence (19) - 8:49; Chad Penney (13) - 10:01; John Spoltore (13) - 11:21 |
| Perry Pappas (3) - pp - 3:39 | | Second period | No scoring |
| No scoring | | Third period | Billy Wright (3) - 6:16 |
| Kevin Hodson - 30 saves/34 shots | | Goalie stats | Ron Bertrand - 23 saves/24 shots |

| May 2 | North Bay Centennials | 7 – 6 | Sault Ste. Marie Greyhounds | Sault Memorial Gardens |
| Jason Firth (8) - 13:51 | | First period | Perry Pappas (4) - pp - 4:35; Tony Iob (16) - 12:48 |
| Billy Wright (4) - 2:58; Robert Thorpe (8) - 5:06; Jason Firth (9) - 13:09 | | Second period | Rick Kowalsky (6) - 3:20; Drew Bannister (3) - 9:16; Jason Denomme (7) - 18:35 |
| Jason Firth (10) - pp - 6:06; Mark Lawrence (20) - 11:27; Mark Lawrence (21) - pp - 19:24 | | Third period | Tony Iob (17) - 4:38 |
| Ron Bertrand - 21 saves/27 shots | | Goalie stats | Kevin Hodson - 18 saves/25 shots |

| May 4 | Sault Ste. Marie Greyhounds | 2 – 1 | North Bay Centennials | North Bay Memorial Gardens |
| No scoring | | First period | No scoring |
| Mark Matier (2) - 12:44; David Matsos (4) - 13:42 | | Second period | Mark Lawrence (22) - pp - 10:38 |
| No scoring | | Third period | No scoring |
| Kevin Hodson - 32 shots/33 saves | | Goalie stats | Ron Bertrand - 23 saves/25 saves |

| May 6 | North Bay Centennials | 2 – 4 | Sault Ste. Marie Greyhounds | Sault Memorial Gardens |
| Mike Burman (3) - 10:25 | | First period | Shaun Imber (4) - pp - 9:29; Mark Matier (3) - pp - 16:55 |
| Mark Lawrence (23) - 10:08 | | Second period | Colin Miller (10) - 6:32; Jarrett Reid (5) - 15:11 |
| No scoring | | Third period | No scoring |
| Ron Bertrand 22 saves/26 shots | | Goalie stats | Kevin Hodson 28 saves/30 shots |

| Sault Ste. Marie wins series 4 – 3 |

== Awards ==
| J. Ross Robertson Cup: | Sault Ste. Marie Greyhounds |
| Hamilton Spectator Trophy: | Peterborough Petes |
| Leyden Trophy: | Peterborough Petes |
| Emms Trophy: | Sault Ste. Marie Greyhounds |
| Red Tilson Trophy: | Todd Simon, Niagara Falls Thunder |
| Eddie Powers Memorial Trophy: | Todd Simon, Niagara Falls Thunder |
| Matt Leyden Trophy: | George Burnett, Niagara Falls Thunder |
| Jim Mahon Memorial Trophy: | Darren McCarty, Belleville Bulls |
| Max Kaminsky Trophy: | Drake Berehowsky, North Bay Centennials |
| OHL Goaltender of the Year: | Mike Fountain, Oshawa Generals |
| Jack Ferguson Award: | Jeff O'Neill, Guelph Storm |
| Dave Pinkney Trophy: | Kevin Hodson, Sault Ste. Marie Greyhounds |
| OHL Executive of the Year: | Bert Templeton, North Bay Centennials |
| Bill Long Award: | Herb Warr, Peterborough Petes |
| Emms Family Award: | Chris Gratton, Kingston Frontenacs |
| F.W. 'Dinty' Moore Trophy: | Sandy Allan, North Bay Centennials |
| William Hanley Trophy: | John Spoltore, North Bay Centennials |
| Leo Lalonde Memorial Trophy: | John Spoltore, North Bay Centennials |
| Bobby Smith Trophy: | Nathan LaFayette, Cornwall Royals |

== 1992 OHL Priority Selection ==
The Guelph Storm held the first overall pick in the 1992 Ontario Priority Selection and selected Jeff O'Neill from the Thornhill Thunderbirds. O'Neill was awarded the Jack Ferguson Award, awarded to the top pick in the draft.

Below are the players who were selected in the first round of the 1992 Ontario Hockey League Priority Selection.

| # | Player | Nationality | OHL Team | Hometown | Minor Team |
|---|---|---|---|---|---|
| 1 | Jeff O'Neill (C) | Canada | Guelph Storm | King City, Ontario | Thornhill Thunderbirds |
| 2 | Brett Lindros (RW) | Canada | Kingston Frontenacs | London, Ontario | St. Michael's Buzzers |
| 3 | Bill McCauley (C) | United States | Detroit Junior Red Wings | Warren, Michigan | Detroit Jr. Red Wings |
| 4 | Wayne Primeau (C) | Canada | Owen Sound Platers | Whitby, Ontario | Whitby Midgets |
| 5 | Mike Martin (D) | Canada | Windsor Spitfires | Stratford, Ontario | Stratford Cullitons |
| 6 | Wes Swinson (D) | Canada | Kitchener Rangers | Peterborough, Ontario | Kingston Voyageurs |
| 7 | Richard Park (C) | United States | Belleville Bulls | Rancho Palos Verdes, California | Toronto Young Nationals |
| 8 | Mark Edmundson (C) | Canada | Ottawa 67's | London, Ontario | London Nationals |
| 9 | Jamie Kress (D) | Canada | Oshawa Generals | Cambridge, Ontario | Cambridge Winterhawks |
| 10 | Rory Fitzpatrick (D) | United States | Sudbury Wolves | Rochester, New York | Rochester Monarchs |
| 11 | John Guirestante (RW) | Canada | London Knights | Toronto, Ontario | Mississauga Black Hawks |
| 12 | Jason Bonsignore (C) | United States | Newmarket Royals | Rochester, New York | Rochester Jr. Americans |
| 13 | Paul McInnes (D) | Canada | Niagara Falls Thunder | Mississauga, Ontario | Toronto Red Wings |
| 14 | Jim Ensom (LW) | Canada | North Bay Centennials | Peterborough, Ontario | Muskoka Bears |
| 15 | Dan Cloutier (G) | Canada | Sault Ste. Marie Greyhounds | Sault Ste. Marie, Ontario | St. Thomas Stars |
| 16 | Matt Johnson (LW) | Canada | Peterborough Petes | Pelham, Ontario | Welland Cougars |

== See also ==
- List of OHA Junior A standings
- List of OHL seasons
- 1992 Memorial Cup
- 1992 NHL entry draft
- 1991 in sports
- 1992 in sports

| Preceded by 1990–91 OHL season | OHL seasons | Succeeded by 1992–93 OHL season |
