= Jamie Storr =

Canadian ice hockey player

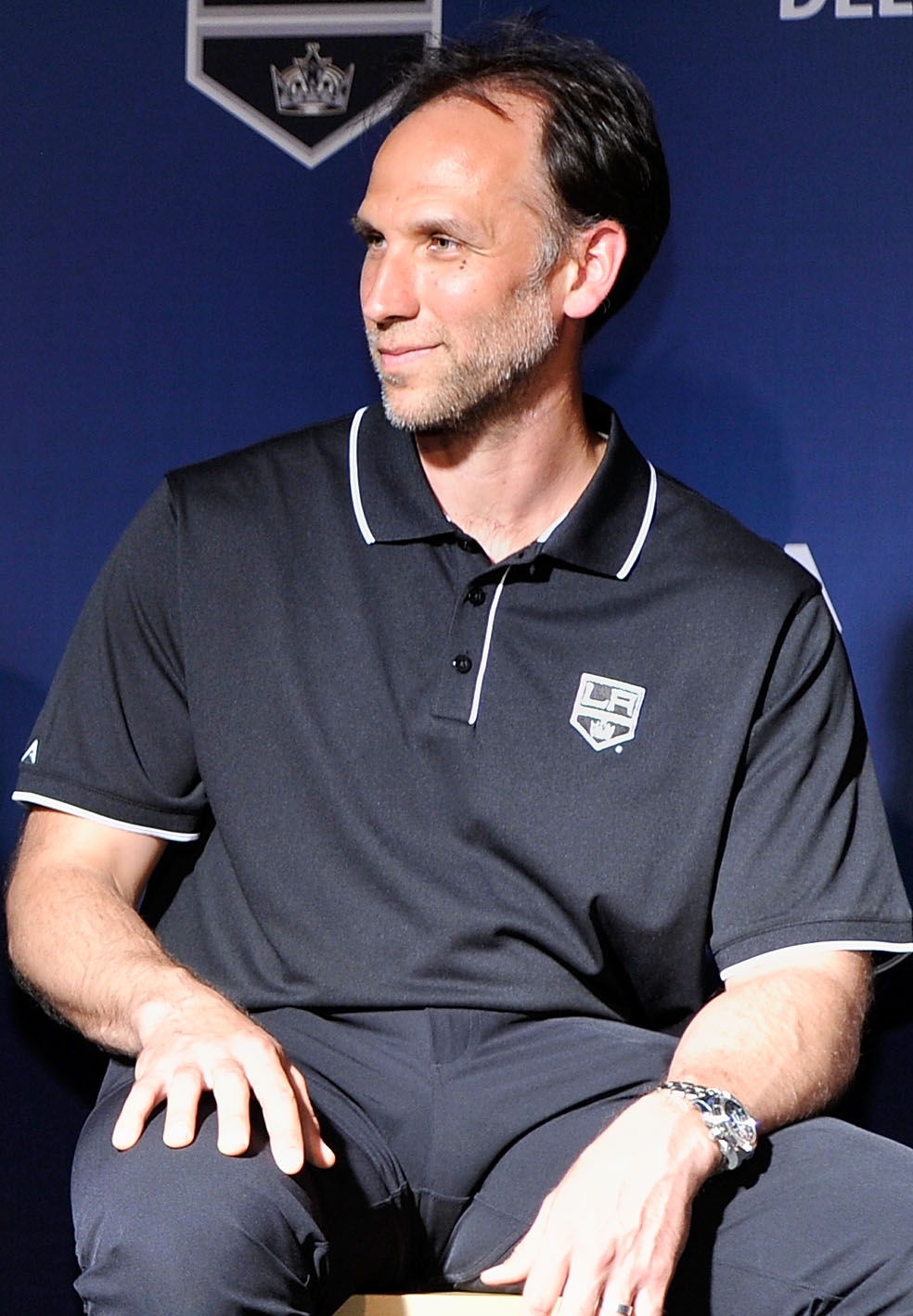
- Storr in 2017
- Born: December 28, 1975 (age 50) Brampton, Ontario, Canada
- Height: 6 ft 2 in (188 cm)
- Weight: 200 lb (91 kg; 14 st 4 lb)
- Position: Goaltender
- Caught: Left
- Played for: Los Angeles Kings; Carolina Hurricanes; DEG Metro Stars
- National team: Canada
- NHL draft: 7th overall, 1994; Los Angeles Kings
- Playing career: 1995–2009

Jamie Storr (born December 28, 1975) is a Canadian former professional ice hockey goaltender. He played in the National Hockey League (NHL) with the Los Angeles Kings and Carolina Hurricanes between 1995 and 2004.

== Playing career ==
Storr was the first goalie selected in the 1991 OHL Entry Draft and played major junior with the Owen Sound Platers and the Windsor Spitfires of the Ontario Hockey League (OHL). In the 1994 NHL entry draft, Storr was drafted 7th overall by the Los Angeles Kings. He remained in the OHL for one more season before turning pro in 1994–95.

Storr spent the majority of his first three seasons in the Kings' minor league system with the Phoenix Roadrunners and Long Beach Ice Dogs of the International Hockey League (IHL). In his rookie season, he was given the opportunity to live with teammate Wayne Gretzky and his family in Beverly Hills, CA. Storr was named to the NHL All-Rookie Team twice, in 1997–98 and 1998–99. Although he first appeared with the Kings in 1994–95, Storr did not play the minimum number of games in one season (25) to not be considered a rookie until after 1998–99, therefore making him eligible for the honour multiple times. His All-Rookie Team appearance in 1997-98 made him the only NHL player to be named to the All-Rookie Team while playing in fewer than 20 games in that season.

Storr remained with the Kings until the 2003–04 season, when he joined the Carolina Hurricanes. He was not, however, able to stick with the club and played in the minor leagues for the next three seasons. In 2006, Storr signed with the German DEG Metro Stars and went overseas to play in the Deutsche Eishockey Liga (DEL). Storr retired after three years with[DEG Metro Stars on 13 May 2009. In 2010 it was announced that Storr would be an emergency backup with DEG Metro Stars; however, he would stay in North America unless needed.

== International play ==
Storr represented Team Canada extensively during his junior career, winning gold at the U-17, U-18 and U-20 levels. At the 1994 and 1995 World Junior Championships in the Czech Republic and Sweden, Storr won back-to-back gold medals with Canada, going undefeated in tournament play.

Storr was one of 2 players to ever win 5 gold medals representing Team Canada before he played his first NHL game. U-17(91), U-18(92), two world Juniors (94) and (95) as well as world championship (94). The only other player to do so was Paul Kariya.

In 1994, he won the World Junior Championships Best Goaltender award and was also named to Team Canada's senior team for the World Championships, where he captured another gold medal, despite not appearing in a game.

== Awards ==
OHL

- Drafted 1st goalie overall to the Owen Sound Platers at the 1991 OHL Draft, going 2nd pick in the second round.
- Named to the All-Rookie Team in 1992.
- Named to the First All-Star Team in 1994.
- Named OHL Goalie of Year in 1994.

NHL

- Drafted 7th overall by the Los Angeles Kings at the 1994 NHL entry draft, the first goalie
- Named to the All-Rookie Team in 1998 and 1999.

DEL

- Won Best Goaltender in 2007.

International

- Won gold medal at the IIHF Under-17 Tournament in 1992.
- Won gold medal at the IIHF Under-18 Phoenix Cup in 1993.
- Won Top Goaltender Award at the IIHF Phoenix Cup in 1993.
- Won gold medal at the World Junior Championships in 1994.
- Won gold medal at the World Junior Championships in 1995.
- Won Top Goaltender Award at the World Junior Championships in 1994.
- Won a gold medal at the World Championships in 1994.

== Off the ice ==
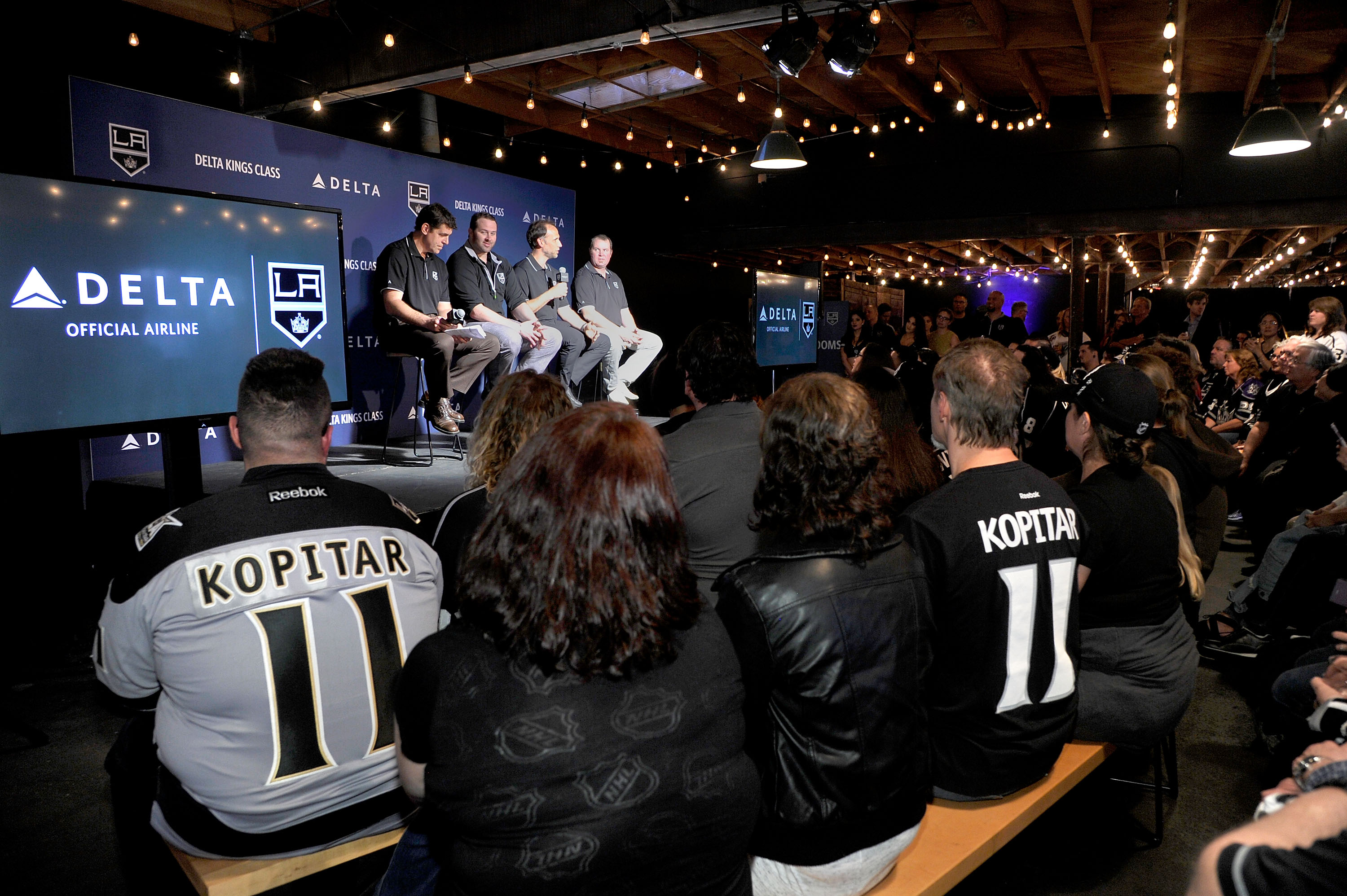
Storr with fellow Kings alumni Sean O'Donnell, Dustin Penner, and Kyle Calder at Delta Kings Class event in 2017.

Storr has been a popular guest on TSN sports show Off The Record with Michael Landsberg. He is also a renowned goaltending coach and mentor to many young Southern California goalies. He runs the Jamie Storr Goalie School at the Toyota Sports Center in El Segundo where they have two week-long camps every July along with a camp every Christmas; they also host a weekend camp in May each year. Storr has worked goaltenders from all different levels and leagues including the DEL training Jochen Reimer, a former teammate of the DEG Metro Stars. Storr also opened up a hockey training center inside the TSC with friend and old teammate Jason Blake. He is a father of three children living with his family in El Segundo, California. He works for the Los Angeles Kings with Kings alumni.

During Storr's playing career, he wore a goaltender mask that featured Japanese dragons to honor his late mother, who was Japanese.

== Career statistics ==
=== Regular season and playoffs ===
			Regular season										Playoffs
Season	Team	League	GP	W	L	T	OTL	MIN	GA	SO	GAA	SV%	GP	W	L	MIN	GA	SO	GAA	SV%
1990–91	Brampton Capitals	CJHL	24	—	—	—	—	1145	91	0	4.77	—	15	—	—	885	60	0	4.07	—
1991–92	Owen Sound Platers	OHL	34	11	16	1	—	1732	128	0	4.43	.877	5	1	4	299	28	0	5.61	—
1992–93	Owen Sound Platers	OHL	41	20	17	3	—	2362	180	0	4.57	.881	8	4	4	454	35	0	4.62	—
1993–94	Owen Sound Platers	OHL	35	21	11	1	—	2004	120	1	3.59	.915	9	4	5	547	44	0	4.82	.915
1994–95	Owen Sound Platers	OHL	17	5	9	2	—	977	64	0	3.93	—	—	—	—	—	—	—	—	—
1994–95	Windsor Spitfires	OHL	4	3	1	0	—	241	8	1	1.99	—	10	6	3	520	34	1	3.92	—
1994–95	Los Angeles Kings	NHL	5	1	3	1	—	263	17	0	3.88	.888	—	—	—	—	—	—	—	—
1995–96	Phoenix Roadrunners	IHL	48	22	20	4	—	2711	139	2	3.08	.897	2	1	1	118	4	1	2.03	.933
1995–96	Los Angeles Kings	NHL	5	3	1	0	—	262	12	0	2.75	.918	—	—	—	—	—	—	—	—
1996–97	Phoenix Roadrunners	IHL	44	16	22	4	—	2441	147	0	3.61	.895	—	—	—	—	—	—	—	—
1996–97	Los Angeles Kings	NHL	5	2	2	1	—	265	11	0	2.49	.925	—	—	—	—	—	—	—	—
1997–98	Long Beach Ice Dogs	IHL	11	7	2	1	—	629	31	0	2.96	.897	—	—	—	—	—	—	—	—
1997–98	Los Angeles Kings	NHL	17	9	5	1	—	920	34	2	2.22	.929	3	0	2	145	9	0	3.72	.883
1998–99	Los Angeles Kings	NHL	28	12	12	2	—	1525	61	4	2.40	.916	—	—	—	—	—	—	—	—
1999–00	Los Angeles Kings	NHL	42	18	15	5	—	2206	93	1	2.53	.908	1	0	1	36	2	0	3.33	.920
2000–01	Los Angeles Kings	NHL	45	19	18	6	—	2498	114	4	2.74	.899	—	—	—	—	—	—	—	—
2001–02	Los Angeles Kings	NHL	19	9	4	3	—	886	28	2	1.90	.922	1	0	0	0	0	0	0.00	1.000
2002–03	Los Angeles Kings	NHL	39	12	19	2	—	2027	86	3	2.54	.905	—	—	—	—	—	—	—	—
2003–04	Lowell Lock Monsters	AHL	13	2	6	2	—	712	38	0	3.20	.881	—	—	—	—	—	—	—	—
2003–04	Carolina Hurricanes	NHL	14	0	8	2	—	660	32	0	2.91	.878	—	—	—	—	—	—	—	—
2004–05	Springfield Falcons	AHL	30	8	20	2	—	1697	91	0	3.22	.905	—	—	—	—	—	—	—	—
2004–05	Utah Grizzlies	AHL	16	6	7	1	—	885	36	1	2.44	.928	—	—	—	—	—	—	—	—
2005–06	Philadelphia Phantoms	AHL	32	13	11	—	5	1743	83	1	2.86	.907	—	—	—	—	—	—	—	—
2006–07	DEG Metro Stars	DEL	51	36	15	—	4	3061	119	4	2.33	.913	9	5	4	560	20	1	2.14	.922
2007–08	DEG Metro Stars	DEL	38	25	13	—	0	2146	91	1	2.55	.913	13	8	5	819	32	0	2.34	.931
2008–09	DEG Metro Stars	DEL	38	28	10	—	0	2292	100	4	2.54	.920	16	9	8	1080	40	1	2.50	.919
DEL totals			127	89	38	—	4	7499	310	9	2.48	—	38	22	17	2459	92	2	2.24	—
NHL totals			219	85	86	23	—	11,512	488	16	2.55	.908	5	0	3	182	11	0	3.65	.892

=== International ===
Year	Team	Event	GP	W	L	T	MIN	GA	SO	GAA	SV%
1994	Canada	WJC	4	—	—	—	240	10	0	2.50	.891
1995	Canada	WJC	4	—	—	—	240	14	0	3.50	—
Junior totals			8	—	—	—	480	24	0	3.00	—

Preceded by Darryl Sydor	Los Angeles Kings first-round draft pick 1994	Succeeded by Aki Berg
