= Todd Simon =

Canadian ice hockey player (born 1972)

- Born: April 21, 1972 (age 54) Toronto, Ontario, Canada
- Height: 5 ft 10 in (178 cm)
- Weight: 187 lb (85 kg; 13 st 5 lb)
- Position: Centre
- Shot: Right
- Played for: Buffalo Sabres
- NHL draft: 203rd overall, 1992; Buffalo Sabres
- Playing career: 1992–2008

Todd Andrew Simon (born April 21, 1972) is a Canadian former professional ice hockey centre.

== Biography ==
As a youth, Simon played in the 1985 Quebec International Pee-Wee Hockey Tournament with the Toronto Young Nationals minor ice hockey team.

Simon played junior ice hockey for the Niagara Falls Thunder of the Ontario Hockey League. He won the Eddie Powers Memorial Trophy as the league's leading scorer in the 1991–92 OHL season.

He was drafted in the ninth round, 203rd overall, by the Buffalo Sabres in the 1992 NHL entry draft. He played fifteen games in the National Hockey League with the Sabres in the 1993–94 regular season, recording one assist, and five more during the 1994 Stanley Cup Playoffs, during which he recorded a goal.

== Career statistics ==
| | | | Regular season | | | | | Playoffs |
| Season | Team | League | GP | G | A | Pts | PIM | GP | G | A | Pts | PIM |
|---|---|---|---|---|---|---|---|---|---|---|---|---|
| 1988–89 | Don Mills Flyers AAA | MTHL U18 | 49 | 36 | 48 | 84 | 36 | — | — | — | — | — |
| 1989–90 | Port Colborne Schooners | GHL | 45 | 40 | 43 | 83 | 120 | — | — | — | — | — |
| 1989–90 | Niagara Falls Thunder | OHL | 9 | 0 | 1 | 1 | 2 | 11 | 3 | 1 | 4 | 2 |
| 1990–91 | Niagara Falls Thunder | OHL | 65 | 51 | 74 | 125 | 35 | 14 | 7 | 8 | 15 | 12 |
| 1991–92 | Niagara Falls Thunder | OHL | 66 | 53 | 93 | 146 | 72 | 17 | 17 | 24 | 41 | 36 |
| 1992–93 | Rochester Americans | AHL | 67 | 27 | 66 | 93 | 54 | 12 | 3 | 14 | 17 | 15 |
| 1993–94 | Buffalo Sabres | NHL | 15 | 0 | 1 | 1 | 0 | 5 | 1 | 0 | 1 | 0 |
| 1993–94 | Rochester Americans | AHL | 55 | 33 | 52 | 85 | 79 | — | — | — | — | — |
| 1994–95 | Rochester Americans | AHL | 69 | 25 | 65 | 90 | 78 | 5 | 0 | 2 | 2 | 21 |
| 1995–96 | Las Vegas Thunder | IHL | 52 | 26 | 48 | 74 | 48 | — | — | — | — | — |
| 1995–96 | Detroit Vipers | IHL | 29 | 19 | 16 | 35 | 20 | 12 | 2 | 12 | 14 | 6 |
| 1996–97 | Detroit Vipers | IHL | 80 | 21 | 51 | 72 | 46 | 18 | 4 | 6 | 10 | 12 |
| 1997–98 | Cincinnati Cyclones | IHL | 81 | 33 | 72 | 105 | 115 | 9 | 2 | 4 | 6 | 12 |
| 1998–99 | Cincinnati Cyclones | IHL | 81 | 26 | 61 | 87 | 72 | 3 | 1 | 1 | 2 | 12 |
| 1999–2000 | Cincinnati Cyclones | IHL | 71 | 19 | 48 | 67 | 58 | 11 | 2 | 6 | 8 | 23 |
| 2000–01 | ESC Moskitos Essen | DEL | 54 | 16 | 43 | 59 | 82 | — | — | — | — | — |
| 2001–02 | ESC Moskitos Essen | DEL | 58 | 17 | 24 | 41 | 56 | — | — | — | — | — |
| 2002–03 | Hannover Scorpions | DEL | 48 | 13 | 22 | 35 | 64 | — | — | — | — | — |
| 2003–04 | EHC Wolfsburg | 2.GBun | 44 | 15 | 23 | 38 | 76 | 12 | 6 | 8 | 14 | 16 |
| 2004–05 | EHC Wolfsburg | DEL | 47 | 12 | 30 | 42 | 72 | 7 | 1 | 2 | 3 | 8 |
| 2005–06 | EHC Wolfsburg | 2.GBun | 45 | 24 | 47 | 71 | 97 | 5 | 0 | 0 | 0 | 6 |
| 2006–07 | EHC Wolfsburg | 2.GBun | 43 | 14 | 38 | 52 | 166 | 10 | 9 | 6 | 15 | 18 |
| 2007–08 | HC Milano Vipers | ITA | 26 | 5 | 27 | 32 | 16 | — | — | — | — | — |
| AHL totals | | | 192 | 85 | 183 | 268 | 211 | 17 | 3 | 16 | 19 | 36 |
| IHL totals | | | 394 | 144 | 296 | 440 | 359 | 53 | 11 | 29 | 40 | 65 |
| DEL totals | | | 207 | 58 | 119 | 177 | 274 | 7 | 1 | 2 | 3 | 8 |
