= Wayne Primeau =

Canadian ice hockey player (born 1976)

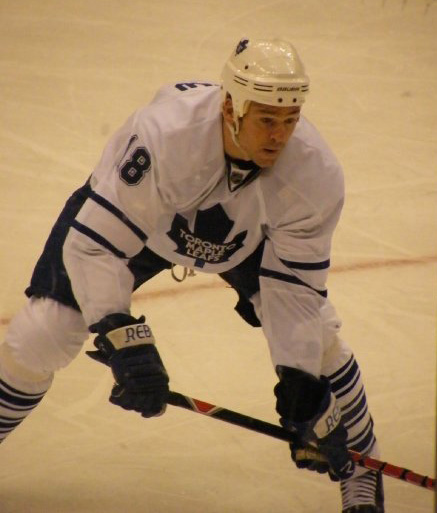
- Primeau with the Toronto Maple Leafs in 2009
- Born: June 4, 1976 (age 50) Scarborough, Ontario, Canada
- Height: 6 ft 4 in (193 cm)
- Weight: 230 lb (104 kg; 16 st 6 lb)
- Position: Centre
- Shot: Left
- Played for: Buffalo Sabres; Tampa Bay Lightning; Pittsburgh Penguins; San Jose Sharks; Boston Bruins; Calgary Flames; Toronto Maple Leafs
- NHL draft: 17th overall, 1994; Buffalo Sabres
- Playing career: 1995–2010

Wayne Michael Primeau (born June 4, 1976) is a Canadian former professional ice hockey player who played in the National Hockey League (NHL). He is the younger brother of Keith Primeau.

== Playing career ==
Primeau was a first round draft pick of the Owen Sound Platers in the Ontario Hockey League (OHL) and played with the Platers for three years from 1992 to 1995.

He was drafted 17th overall in 1994 by the Buffalo Sabres, where he scored his first NHL goal in his first NHL game against Martin Brodeur of the New Jersey Devils. He was traded to the Tampa Bay Lightning in 2000 and was then traded to the Pittsburgh Penguins on February 1, 2001.

Primeau was acquired by the San Jose Sharks from the Penguins in exchange for Matt Bradley on March 11, 2003. After a career year in 2003–04, Primeau was eligible for group IV unrestricted free agency. However, he decided to re-sign with the Sharks.

Primeau was traded to the Boston Bruins on November 30, 2005, (along with Brad Stuart and Marco Sturm) in exchange for Joe Thornton. In February 2007, the Bruins traded him to the Calgary Flames (again along with Brad Stuart) in exchange for Chuck Kobasew and Andrew Ference.

On July 27, 2009, Primeau was traded to the Toronto Maple Leafs (along with a second round pick in the 2011 NHL entry draft) in exchange for forward Colin Stuart, defenceman Anton Strålman and a seventh-round pick in 2012.

Prior to the start of the Maple Leafs' 2010 training camp, Primeau was signed to a professional tryout contract with the Leafs. He was released at the conclusion of training camp on September 26.

== Career statistics ==
			Regular season					Playoffs
Season	Team	League	GP	G	A	Pts	PIM	GP	G	A	Pts	PIM
1992–93	Owen Sound Platers	OHL	66	10	27	37	110	8	1	4	5	0
1993–94	Owen Sound Platers	OHL	65	25	50	75	75	9	1	6	7	8
1994–95	Owen Sound Platers	OHL	66	34	62	96	84	10	4	9	13	15
1994–95	Buffalo Sabres	NHL	1	1	0	1	0	—	—	—	—	—
1995–96	Owen Sound Platers	OHL	28	15	29	44	52	—	—	—	—	—
1995–96	Oshawa Generals	OHL	24	12	13	25	33	3	2	3	5	2
1995–96	Rochester Americans	AHL	8	2	3	5	6	17	3	1	4	11
1995–96	Buffalo Sabres	NHL	2	0	0	0	0	—	—	—	—	—
1996–97	Rochester Americans	AHL	24	9	5	14	27	1	0	0	0	0
1996–97	Buffalo Sabres	NHL	45	2	4	6	64	9	0	0	0	6
1997–98	Buffalo Sabres	NHL	69	6	6	12	87	14	1	3	4	6
1998–99	Buffalo Sabres	NHL	67	5	8	13	38	19	3	4	7	6
1999–2000	Buffalo Sabres	NHL	41	5	7	12	38	—	—	—	—	—
1999–2000	Tampa Bay Lightning	NHL	17	2	3	5	25	—	—	—	—	—
2000–01	Tampa Bay Lightning	NHL	47	2	13	15	77	—	—	—	—	—
2000–01	Pittsburgh Penguins	NHL	28	1	6	7	54	18	1	3	4	2
2001–02	Pittsburgh Penguins	NHL	33	3	7	10	18	—	—	—	—	—
2002–03	Pittsburgh Penguins	NHL	70	5	11	16	55	—	—	—	—	—
2002–03	San Jose Sharks	NHL	7	1	1	2	0	—	—	—	—	—
2003–04	San Jose Sharks	NHL	72	9	20	29	90	17	1	2	3	4
2005–06	San Jose Sharks	NHL	21	5	3	8	17	—	—	—	—	—
2005–06	Boston Bruins	NHL	50	6	8	14	40	—	—	—	—	—
2006–07	Boston Bruins	NHL	51	7	8	15	75	—	—	—	—	—
2006–07	Calgary Flames	NHL	27	3	4	7	36	6	0	2	2	14
2007–08	Calgary Flames	NHL	43	3	7	10	26	7	1	0	1	4
2008–09	Calgary Flames	NHL	24	0	4	4	14	—	—	—	—	—
2009–10	Toronto Maple Leafs	NHL	59	3	5	8	35	—	—	—	—	—
NHL totals			774	69	125	194	789	90	7	14	21	42

== See also ==
- Notable families in the NHL

Preceded by David Cooper	Buffalo Sabres first-round draft pick 1994	Succeeded by Jay McKee
