= 1993–94 OHL season =

Junior ice hockey season

The 1993–94 OHL season was the 14th season of the Ontario Hockey League. Sixteen teams each played 66 games. The North Bay Centennials won the J. Ross Robertson Cup, defeating the Detroit Junior Red Wings.

== Regular season ==
=== Final standings ===
Note: DIV = Division; GP = Games played; W = Wins; L = Losses; T = Ties; GF = Goals for; GA = Goals against; PTS = Points; x = clinched playoff berth; y = clinched division title;

=== Leyden Division ===
Rank	Team	GP	W	L	T	PTS	GF	GA
1	y-North Bay Centennials	66	46	15	5	97	351	226
2	x-Ottawa 67's	66	33	22	11	77	274	229
3	x-Sudbury Wolves	66	34	26	6	74	299	275
4	x-Belleville Bulls	66	32	28	6	70	303	264
5	x-Kingston Frontenacs	66	30	28	8	68	265	259
6	x-Oshawa Generals	66	26	32	8	60	272	309
7	x-Peterborough Petes	66	15	41	10	40	252	350
8	Newmarket Royals	66	9	47	10	28	231	377

=== Emms Division ===
Rank	Team	GP	W	L	T	PTS	GF	GA
1	y-Detroit Junior Red Wings	66	42	20	4	88	312	237
2	x-Sault Ste. Marie Greyhounds	66	35	24	7	77	319	268
3	x-Guelph Storm	66	32	28	6	70	323	290
4	x-Owen Sound Platers	66	34	30	2	70	303	284
5	x-Kitchener Rangers	66	32	30	4	68	286	316
6	x-London Knights	66	32	30	4	68	293	279
7	x-Windsor Spitfires	66	25	36	5	55	253	298
8	Niagara Falls Thunder	66	21	41	4	46	277	352

=== Scoring leaders ===
Player	Team	GP	G	A	Pts	PIM
Jason Allison	London Knights	56	55	87	142	68
Kevin Brown	Detroit Junior Red Wings	57	54	81	135	85
Jeff O'Neill	Guelph Storm	66	45	81	126	95
Keli Corpse	Kingston Frontenacs	63	42	84	126	55
Bill Bowler	Windsor Spitfires	66	47	76	123	39
Jamie Rivers	Sudbury Wolves	65	32	89	121	58
Trevor Gallant	Kitchener Rangers	66	39	80	119	48
Dave Gilmore	London Knights	61	48	69	117	67
Jason MacDonald	Owen Sound Platers	66	55	61	116	177
Sylvain Cloutier	Guelph Storm	66	45	71	116	127

== Playoffs ==
Division quarterfinals
L1	North Bay	bye
L4	Belleville	4
L5	Kingston	2
L3	Sudbury	4
L6	Oshawa	1
L7	Peterborough	3
L2	Ottawa	4
E1	Detroit	bye
E4	Owen Sound	4
E5	Kitchener	1
E3	Guelph	4
E6	London	1
E7	Windsor	0
E2	S.S. Marie	4

Quarterfinals
L1	North Bay	4
L4	Belleville	2
L3	Sudbury	2
L2	Ottawa	4
E1	Detroit	4
E4	Owen Sound	0
E3	Guelph	0
E2	S.S. Marie	4

Semifinals
L1	North Bay	4
L2	Ottawa	1
E1	Detroit	4
E2	S.S. Marie	2

Finals
L1	North Bay	4
E1	Detroit	3

=== Division quarter-finals ===
==== Leyden Division ====
===== (2) Ottawa 67's vs. (7) Peterborough Petes =====
March 20	Peterborough Petes	2 – 4	Ottawa 67's	Ottawa Civic Centre

March 24	Ottawa 67's	1 – 4	Peterborough Petes	Peterborough Memorial Centre

March 25	Peterborough Petes	1 – 4	Ottawa 67's	Ottawa Civic Centre

March 27	Ottawa 67's	3 – 4	Peterborough Petes	Peterborough Memorial Centre

March 29	Peterborough Petes	3 – 12	Ottawa 67's	Ottawa Civic Centre

March 30	Ottawa 67's	3 – 5	Peterborough Petes	Peterborough Memorial Centre

March 31	Peterborough Petes	4 – 5	OT	Ottawa 67's	Ottawa Civic Centre

Ottawa wins series 4 – 3

===== (3) Sudbury Wolves vs. (6) Oshawa Generals =====
March 20	Oshawa Generals	2 – 4	Sudbury Wolves	Sudbury Community Arena

March 22	Sudbury Wolves	3 – 4	Oshawa Generals	Oshawa Civic Auditorium

March 25	Oshawa Generals	2 – 3	Sudbury Wolves	Sudbury Community Arena

March 27	Sudbury Wolves	3 – 2	Oshawa Generals	Oshawa Civic Auditorium

March 29	Oshawa Generals	4 – 5	OT	Sudbury Wolves	Sudbury Community Arena

Sudbury wins series 4 – 1

===== (4) Belleville Bulls vs. (5) Kingston Frontenacs =====
March 19	Kingston Frontenacs	1 – 5	Belleville Bulls	Yardmen Arena

March 22	Belleville Bulls	4 – 0	Kingston Frontenacs	Kingston Memorial Centre

March 23	Kingston Frontenacs	3 – 1	Belleville Bulls	Yardmen Arena

March 25	Belleville Bulls	3 – 2	Kingston Frontenacs	Kingston Memorial Centre

March 26	Kingston Frontenacs	6 – 2	Belleville Bulls	Yardmen Arena

March 29	Belleville Bulls	6 – 2	Kingston Frontenacs	Kingston Memorial Centre

Belleville wins series 4 – 2

==== Emms Division ====
===== (2) Sault Ste. Marie Greyhounds vs. (7) Windsor Spitfires =====
March 20	Windsor Spitfires	2 – 6	Sault Ste. Marie Greyhounds	Sault Memorial Gardens
No scoring		First period	14:02 - pp - Jeff Toms (1)
3:46 - pp - Bill Bowler (1)		Second period	1:11 - Aaron Gavey (1); 7:05 - sh - Jeff Toms (2); 10:28 - Brad Baber (1)
8:58 - Vladimir Krechin (1)		Third period	1:27 - sh - Joe Van Volsen (1); 16:07 - pp - Gary Roach
Travis Scott (32 saves/38 shots)		Goalie stats	Dan Cloutier (26 saves/28 shots)

March 21	Windsor Spitfires	2 – 5	Sault Ste. Marie Greyhounds	Sault Memorial Gardens
14:18 - Cory Evans (1)		First period	7:29 - pp - Jeremy Stevenson (1); 10:23 - sh - Aaron Gavey (2); 13:08 - pp - Tom MacDonald (1); 16:34 - pp - Wade Gibson (1)
2:14 - Mike Martin (1)		Second period	1:24 - Steve Sullivan (1)
No scoring		Third period	No scoring
Travis Scott (25 saves/30 shots)		Goalie stats	Dan Cloutier (21 saves/23 shots)

March 24	Sault Ste. Marie Greyhounds	2 – 1	Windsor Spitfires	Windsor Arena
No scoring		First period	No scoring
14:52 - pp - Drew Bannister (1)		Second period	No scoring
9:21 - Steve Sullivan (2)		Third period	17:18 - pp - Bill Bowler (2)
Dan Cloutier (26 saves/27 shots)		Goalie stats	Travis Scott (26 saves/28 shots)

March 25	Sault Ste. Marie Greyhounds	3 – 2	Windsor Spitfires	Windsor Arena
5:45 - Jeff Toms (3); 15:05 - Peter MacKellar (1)		First period	2:55 - Vladimir Krechin (2)
0:32 - pp - Jeff Toms (4)		Second period	No scoring
No scoring		Third period	8:31 - David Roche (1)
Dan Cloutier (26 saves/28 shots)		Goalie stats	Travis Scott (24 saves/27 shots)

Sault Ste. Marie wins series 4 – 0

===== (3) Guelph Storm vs. (6) London Knights =====
March 20	London Knights	4 – 1	Guelph Storm	Guelph Memorial Gardens

March 22	Guelph Storm	7 – 5	London Knights	London Gardens

March 25	London Knights	2 – 5	Guelph Storm	Guelph Memorial Gardens

March 27	Guelph Storm	5 – 2	London Knights	London Gardens

March 28	London Knights	5 – 9	Guelph Storm	Guelph Memorial Gardens

Guelph wins series 4 – 1

===== (4) Owen Sound Platers vs. (5) Kitchener Rangers =====
March 19	Kitchener Rangers	5 – 6	Owen Sound Platers	Bayshore Community Centre

March 22	Owen Sound Platers	3 – 2	Kitchener Rangers	Kitchener Memorial Auditorium

March 24	Kitchener Rangers	7 – 9	Owen Sound Platers	Bayshore Community Centre

March 25	Owen Sound Platers	3 – 4	OT	Kitchener Rangers	Kitchener Memorial Auditorium

March 26	Kitchener Rangers	4 – 5	Owen Sound Platers	Bayshore Community Centre

Owen Sound wins series 4 – 1

=== Division semi-finals ===
==== Leyden Division ====
===== (1) North Bay Centennials vs. (4) Belleville Bulls =====
April 1	Belleville Bulls	1 – 6	North Bay Centennials	North Bay Memorial Gardens

April 2	Belleville Bulls	2 – 7	North Bay Centennials	North Bay Memorial Gardens

April 4	North Bay Centennials	3 – 7	Belleville Bulls	Yardmen Arena

April 5	North Bay Centennials	2 – 5	Belleville Bulls	Yardmen Arena

April 10	Belleville Bulls	3 – 5	North Bay Centennials	North Bay Memorial Gardens

April 12	North Bay Centennials	5 – 3	Belleville Bulls	Yardmen Arena

North Bay wins series 4 – 2

===== (2) Ottawa 67's vs. (3) Sudbury Wolves =====
April 2	Ottawa 67's	6 – 7	OT	Sudbury Wolves	Sudbury Community Arena

April 5	Sudbury Wolves	3 – 8	Ottawa 67's	Ottawa Civic Centre

April 7	Ottawa 67's	5 – 4	OT	Sudbury Wolves	Sudbury Community Arena

April 8	Sudbury Wolves	2 – 3	Ottawa 67's	Ottawa Civic Centre

April 10	Sudbury Wolves	2 – 3	Ottawa 67's	Ottawa Civic Centre

Ottawa wins series 4 – 1

==== Emms Division ====
===== (1) Detroit Junior Red Wings vs. (4) Owen Sound Platers =====
April 1	Owen Sound Platers	3 – 5	Detroit Jr. Red Wings	Joe Louis Arena

April 3	Detroit Jr. Red Wings	7 – 5	Owen Sound Platers	Bayshore Community Centre

April 5	Owen Sound Platers	3 – 5	Detroit Jr. Red Wings	Joe Louis Arena

April 8	Detroit Jr. Red Wings	5 – 4	Owen Sound Platers	Bayshore Community Centre

Detroit wins series 4 – 0

===== (2) Sault Ste. Marie Greyhounds vs. (3) Guelph Storm =====
April 2	Guelph Storm	5 – 7	Sault Ste. Marie Greyhounds	Sault Memorial Gardens

April 4	Guelph Storm	1 – 2	Sault Ste. Marie Greyhounds	Sault Memorial Gardens

April 6	Sault Ste. Marie Greyhounds	6 – 5	OT	Guelph Storm	Guelph Memorial Gardens

April 8	Sault Ste. Marie Greyhounds	6 – 4	Guelph Storm	Guelph Memorial Gardens

Sault Ste. Marie wins series 4 – 0

=== Division finals ===
==== Leyden Division ====
===== (1) North Bay Centennials vs. (2) Ottawa 67's =====
April 16	Ottawa 67's	0 – 4	North Bay Centennials	North Bay Memorial Gardens

April 17	North Bay Centennials	5 – 4	OT	Ottawa 67's	Ottawa Civic Centre

April 19	Ottawa 67's	2 – 7	North Bay Centennials	North Bay Memorial Gardens

April 21	North Bay Centennials	6 – 7	OT	Ottawa 67's	Ottawa Civic Centre

April 23	Ottawa 67's	3 – 4	OT	North Bay Centennials	North Bay Memorial Gardens

North Bay wins series 4 – 1

==== Emms Division ====
===== (1) Detroit Junior Red Wings vs. (2) Sault Ste. Marie Greyhounds =====
April 14	Sault Ste. Marie Greyhounds	3 – 6	Detroit Jr. Red Wings	Joe Louis Arena

April 16	Sault Ste. Marie Greyhounds	3 – 6	Detroit Jr. Red Wings	Joe Louis Arena

April 18	Detroit Jr. Red Wings	4 – 5	OT	Sault Ste. Marie Greyhounds	Sault Memorial Gardens

April 20	Detroit Jr. Red Wings	4 – 5	Sault Ste. Marie Greyhounds	Sault Memorial Gardens

April 21	Sault Ste. Marie Greyhounds	2 – 6	Detroit Jr. Red Wings	Joe Louis Arena

April 23	Detroit Jr. Red Wings	7 – 4	Sault Ste. Marie Greyhounds	Sault Memorial Gardens

Detroit wins series 4 – 2

=== J. Ross Robertson Cup ===
==== (L1) North Bay Centennials vs. (E1) Detroit Junior Red Wings ====
April 28	Detroit Jr. Red Wings	3 – 7	North Bay Centennials	North Bay Memorial Gardens
6:58 - Dale Junkin (9)		First period	No scoring
12:30 - pp - Bob Wren (9)		Second period	2:35 - pp - Lee Jinman (13); 2:48 - Jason Campeau (4)
12:28 - Dale Junkin (10)		Third period	2:18 - Vitali Yachmenev (10); 6:36 - Brad Brown (2); 6:53 - pp - Brad Brown (3); 7:25 - pp - Lee Jinman (14); 10:20 - pp - Jeff Shevalier (4)
Aaron Ellis (17 saves/22 shots); Jason Saal (5 saves/7 shots)		Goalie stats	Sandy Allan (26 saves/29 shots)

May 1	North Bay Centennials	3 – 6	Detroit Jr. Red Wings	Joe Louis Arena
2:04 - Stefan Rivard (3)		First period	6:21 - Bob Wren (10); 8:35 - Todd Harvey (8); 15:48 - Kevin Brown (9)
15:41 - Damien Bloye (2)		Second period	2:59 - pp - Bob Wren (11); 4:29 - Kevin Brown (10); 7:10 - Dale Junkin (11)
4:54 - Lee Jinman (15)		Third period	No scoring
Sandy Allan and Scott Roche (Replaced Allan after the fourth goal) (20 saves/26 shots)		Goalie stats	Aaron Ellis (26 saves/29 shots)

May 3	North Bay Centennials	5 – 7	Detroit Jr. Red Wings	Joe Louis Arena
No scoring		First period	6:07 - pp - Kevin Brown (11); 10:56 - Mike Harding (7); 17:34 - Bob Wren (12)
5:15 - Jeff Shevalier (5); 9:46 - Jeff Shevalier (6); 18:07 - pp - Scott Cherrey (5)		Second period	4:00 - Todd Harvey (9); 7:12 - Kevin Brown (12)
13:03 - Brian Stagg (1); 14:59 - Bill Lang (6)		Third period	0:19 - Dale Junkin (12); 10:25 - Jeff Mitchell (3)
Sandy Allan and Scott Roche (Replaced Allan after the third goal) (19 saves/26 shots)		Goalie stats	Aaron Ellis (29 saves/34 shots)

May 5	Detroit Jr. Red Wings	3 – 5	North Bay Centennials	North Bay Memorial Gardens
17:45 - pp - Todd Harvey (10); 18:53 - Jamie Allison (2)		First period	5:19 - pp - Jeff Shevalier (7); 7:36 - Vitali Yachmenev (11); 9:56 - pp - Jeff Shevalier (8)
15:43 - pp - Kevin Brown (13)		Second period	9:34 - pp - B.J. MacPherson (8)
No scoring		Third period	4:59 - Bill Lang (7)
Aaron Ellis (37 saves/42 shots)		Goalie stats	Sandy Allan (32 saves/35 shots)

May 7	Detroit Jr. Red Wings	5 – 2	North Bay Centennials	North Bay Memorial Gardens
2:30 - Bill McCauley (2); 14:10 - Mike Harding (8); 16:34 - Mike Harding (9)		First period	7:02 - pp - B.J. MacPherson (9)
8:42 - Kevin Brown (14)		Second period	13:01 - Bill Lang (8)
1:59 - pp - Duane Harmer (1)		Third period	No scoring
Aaron Ellis (20 saves/22 shots)		Goalie stats	Sandy Allan (24 saves/29 shots)

May 9	North Bay Centennials	5 – 3	Detroit Jr. Red Wings	Joe Louis Arena
15:39 - B.J. MacPherson (10); 18:44 - Denis Gaudet (1)		First period	4:26 - Bill McCauley (3); 4:38 - Mike Harding (10); 16:37 - Mike Harding (11)
No scoring		Second period	No scoring
1:35 - Lee Jinman (16); 4:52 - B.J. MacPherson (11); 13:35 - Lee Jinman (17)		Third period	No scoring
Sandy Allan (12 saves/15 shots); Scott Roche (18 saves/18 shots)		Goalie stats	Aaron Ellis (18 saves/23 shots)

May 11	Detroit Jr. Red Wings	4 – 5	OT	North Bay Centennials	North Bay Memorial Gardens
8:49 - Bill McCauley (4)		First period		6:01 - Vitali Yachmenev (12)
16:26 - Mike Harding (12)		Second period		6:39 - sh - Vitali Yachmenev (13)
3:38 - Sean Haggerty (9); 13:35 - Dale Junkin (13)		Third period		5:39 - pp - Bill Lang (9); 14:23 - Lee Jinman (18)
No scoring		First overtime period		8:08 - Jason Campeau (5)
Aaron Ellis (24 saves/29 shots)		Goalie stats		Scott Roche (29 saves/33 shots)

North Bay wins series 4 – 3

== Awards ==
J. Ross Robertson Cup:	North Bay Centennials
Hamilton Spectator Trophy:	North Bay Centennials
Leyden Trophy:	North Bay Centennials
Emms Trophy:	Detroit Junior Red Wings
Red Tilson Trophy:	Jason Allison, London Knights
Eddie Powers Memorial Trophy:	Jason Allison, London Knights
Matt Leyden Trophy:	Bert Templeton, North Bay Centennials
Jim Mahon Memorial Trophy:	Kevin Brown, Detroit Junior Red Wings
Max Kaminsky Trophy:	Jamie Rivers, Sudbury Wolves
OHL Goaltender of the Year:	Jamie Storr, Owen Sound Platers
Jack Ferguson Award:	Jeff Brown, Sarnia Sting
Dave Pinkney Trophy:	Sandy Allan and Scott Roche, North Bay Centennials
OHL Executive of the Year:	Jim Rutherford, Detroit Junior Red Wings
Bill Long Award:	Brian Kilrea, Ottawa 67's
Emms Family Award:	Vitali Yachmenev, North Bay Centennials
F.W. 'Dinty' Moore Trophy:	Scott Roche, North Bay Centennials
OHL Humanitarian of the Year:	Brent Tully, Peterborough Petes
William Hanley Trophy:	Jason Allison, London Knights
Leo Lalonde Memorial Trophy:	B.J. MacPherson, North Bay Centennials
Bobby Smith Trophy:	Ethan Moreau, Niagara Falls Thunder

== All-Star teams ==
The OHL All-star teams were selected by the OHL's general managers.

=== First team ===
- Jason Allison, Centre, London Knights
- Jeff Shevalier, Left Wing, North Bay Centennials
- Kevin Brown, Right Wing, Detroit Jr. Red Wings
- Jamie Rivers, Defence, Sudbury Wolves
- Nick Stajduhar, Defence, London Knights
- Jamie Storr, Goaltender, Owen Sound Platers
- Bert Templeton, Coach, North Bay Centennials

=== Second team ===
- Keli Corpse, Centre, Kingston Frontenacs
- Bob Wren, Left Wing, Detroit Jr. Red Wings
- Jason MacDonald, Right Wing, Owen Sound Platers
- Drew Bannister, Defence, Sault Ste. Marie Greyhounds
- Ed Jovanovski, Defence, Windsor Spitfires
- Matt Mullin, Goaltender, Sudbury Wolves
- Paul Maurice, Coach, Detroit Jr. Red Wings

=== Third team ===
- Michael Peca, Centre, Ottawa 67's
- Ethan Moreau, Left Wing, Niagara Falls Thunder
- Vitali Yachmenev, Right Wing, North Bay Centennials
- Jason Gladney, Defence, Kitchener Rangers
- Brad Brown, Defence, North Bay Centennials
- Sandy Allan, Goaltender, North Bay Centennials
- Jerry Harrigan, Coach, Owen Sound Platers

== 1994 OHL Priority Selection ==
The Sarnia Sting held the first overall pick in the 1994 Ontario Priority Selection and selected Jeff Brown from the Thornhill Islanders. Brown was awarded the Jack Ferguson Award, awarded to the top pick in the draft.

Below are the players who were selected in the first round of the 1994 Ontario Hockey League Priority Selection.

#	Player	Nationality	OHL Team	Hometown	Minor Team
1	Jeff Brown (D)	Canada	Sarnia Sting	Mississauga, Ontario	Thornhill Islanders
2	Geoff Peters (C)	Canada	Niagara Falls Thunder	St. Catharines, Ontario	Wexford Bantams
3	Kevin Bolibruck (D)	Canada	Peterborough Petes	Thorold, Ontario	Thorold Black Hawks
4	Glenn Crawford (C)	Canada	Windsor Spitfires	Barrie, Ontario	Barrie Colts
5	Jeff Ware (D)	Canada	Oshawa Generals	Toronto, Ontario	Wexford Raiders
6	Chris Allen (D)	Canada	Kingston Frontenacs	Blenheim, Ontario	Leamington Flyers
7	Jason Doyle (RW)	Canada	London Knights	Toronto, Ontario	Wexford Bantams
8	Ryan Pepperal (RW)	Canada	Kitchener Rangers	Niagara Falls, Ontario	Niagara Falls Canucks
9	Matt Osborne (D)	Canada	Owen Sound Platers	Conn, Ontario	Waterloo Siskins
10	Brian Wesenberg (RW)	Canada	Peterborough Petes	Peterborough, Ontario	Cobourg Cougars
11	Daniel Cleary (LW)	Canada	Belleville Bulls	Harbour Grace, Newfoundland	Kingston Voyageurs
12	Richard Rochefort (C)	Canada	Sudbury Wolves	North Bay, Ontario	Waterloo Siskins
13	Sean Blanchard (D)	Canada	Ottawa 67's	Garson, Ontario	Valley East Midgets
14	Steve Lowe (C)	Canada	Sault Ste. Marie Greyhounds	Kitchener, Ontario	Caledon Canadians
15	Bryan Berard (D)	United States	Detroit Junior Red Wings	Woonsocket, Rhode Island	Mount St. Charles Academy
16	Steven Carpenter (LW)	Canada	North Bay Centennials	Rollo Bay, Prince Edward Island	Charlottetown Abbies

== See also ==
- List of OHA Junior A standings
- List of OHL seasons
- 1994 Memorial Cup
- 1994 NHL entry draft
- 1993 in sports
- 1994 in sports

Preceded by 1992–93 OHL season	OHL seasons	Succeeded by 1994–95 OHL season
