= Owen Sound Platers =

Canadian junior ice hockey team (1989–2000)

- City: Owen Sound, Ontario
- League: Ontario Hockey League
- Operated: 1989–2000
- Home arena: Bayshore Community Centre
- Colours: Black, white, gold and red

Franchise history
- 1968–1972: Guelph CMC's
- 1972–1975: Guelph Biltmore Madhatters
- 1975–1989: Guelph Platers
- 1989–2000: Owen Sound Platers
- 2000–present: Owen Sound Attack

The Owen Sound Platers were a Canadian junior ice hockey team based in Owen Sound, Ontario. The team played in the Ontario Hockey League from 1989 to 2000, then was sold to new owners who renamed the team the Owen Sound Attack.

== History ==
In 1989, the Holody family relocated the Guelph Platers to Owen Sound, Ontario, retaining the name "Platers", as the Holody family owned a local electroplating company.

The team played home games in the Bayshore Community Centre.

Dave Siciliano coached the Platers to 39 wins in 68 games during the 1998–99 season, and a third-place finish in the Western Conference. In the playoffs, the Platers won the first round four games to one versus the Sault Ste. Marie Greyhounds, won the second round four games to two versus the Guelph Storm, then lost in the third round four games to one versus the London Knights. The 1998–99 season marked the first time which the Platers advanced to the third round of the playoffs during the franchise's history in Owen Sound.

Despite many mediocre seasons, support for the team has remained strong. When the Holody's decided to sell the team in 2000, several local Owen Sound business-people banded together to purchase the team. After a bidding war and a legal battle with another suitor, the team remained in Owen Sound. The ownership group elected for a name change and came up with the Owen Sound Attack.

== Coaches ==
List of coaches with multiple seasons in parentheses.

- 1989–1991, Len McNamara (2)
- 1991–1992, Rick Tarasuk
- 1992–1993, Jerry Harrigan (3)
- 1995–1996, Ric Seiling, John Lovell
- 1996–1997, John Lovell (3)
- 1997–1998, John Lovell, Dave Siciliano
- 1998–1999, Dave Siciliano (3)
- 1999–2000, Dave Siciliano, Brian O'Leary

== Players ==
Andrew Brunette won the 1992–93 Eddie Powers Memorial Trophy as the top scorer in the OHL with 62 Goals, 100 Assists and 162 Points. He also tied for the Canadian Hockey League's scoring lead. Brunette was selected by the Washington Capitals 174th overall in the 7th round of 1993 NHL entry draft.

Jamie Storr was the 1993–94 OHL Goaltender of the Year. Storr was the starting goalie for back-to-back World Junior Hockey Championship Gold medals in 1993 and 1994. In 1994 he was drafted 7th overall by the Los Angeles Kings.

Dan Snyder, a former captain of the Owen Sound Platers, had his number 14 retired by the Owen Sound Attack in 2003. Snyder was twice voted his team's humanitarian of the year. The Ontario Hockey League renamed its Humanitarian of the Year award posthumously in honour of Dan Snyder, who died from injuries suffered in a vehicular accident with teammate Dany Heatley in 2003.

=== NHL alumni ===
Nineteen alumni of the Owen Sound Platers graduated to play in the National Hockey League (NHL).

- Sean Avery
- Andrew Brunette
- Jeff Christian
- Ryan Christie
- Todd Hlushko
- Greg Jacina
- Brent Johnson
- Jason MacDonald
- Adam Mair
- Kirk Maltby
- Chris Minard
- Wayne Primeau
- Curtis Sanford
- Dan Snyder
- Jamie Storr
- Scott Walker
- Joel Ward
- Kevin Weekes
- Sean Whyte

== Season-by-season results ==
Regular season and playoffs results:

Season	Games	Won	Lost	Tied	OTL	Points	Pct %	Goals for	Goals against	Standing	Playoffs
1989–90	66	28	31	7	-	63	0.477	265	305	4th Emms	Defeated Sudbury Wolves 4 games to 3 in first round. Lost to Niagara Falls Thunder 4 games to 1 in quarter-finals.
1990–91	66	13	48	5	-	31	0.235	269	373	7th Emms	did not qualify
1991–92	66	23	41	2	-	48	0.364	260	315	6th Emms	Lost to London Knights 4 games to 1 in first round.
1992–93	66	29	29	8	-	66	0.500	330	324	4th Emms	Defeated Niagara Falls Thunder 4 games to 0 in first round. Lost to S.S. Marie Greyhounds 4 games to 0 in quarter-finals.
1993–94	66	34	30	2	-	70	0.530	303	284	4th Emms	Defeated Kitchener Rangers 4 games to 1 in division quarter-finals. Lost to Detroit Jr. Red Wings 4 games to 0 in division semi-finals.
1994–95	66	22	38	6	-	50	0.379	239	299	3rd Central	Defeated Niagara Falls Thunder 4 games to 2 in division quarter-finals. Lost to Guelph Storm 4 games to 0 in quarter-finals.
1995–96	66	29	32	5	-	63	0.477	274	313	4th Central	Lost to Niagara Falls Thunder 4 games to 2 in division quarter-finals.
1996–97	66	27	37	2	-	56	0.424	258	318	4th Central	Lost to Barrie Colts 4 games to 0 in division quarter-finals.
1997–98	66	27	34	5	-	59	0.447	270	312	4th Central	Defeated Kitchener Rangers 4 games to 2 in division quarter-finals. Lost to Ottawa 67's 4 games to 1 in quarter-finals.
1998–99	68	39	24	5	-	83	0.610	312	293	2nd Midwest	Defeated S.S. Marie Greyhounds 4 games to 1 in conference quarter-finals. Defeated Guelph Storm 4 games to 2 in conference semi-finals. Lost to London Knights 4 games to 1 in conference finals.
1999–2000	68	21	35	6	6	54	0.353	237	292	5th Midwest	did not qualify

== Uniforms and logos ==

The Platers used the same logo as the Guelph Platers from 1989 to 1995, changing the city name. The Platers u redesigned their logo for the 1995–96 season, remaining in the same black, gold, red and white colour scheme.
