= Mark Edmundson =

American author and academic

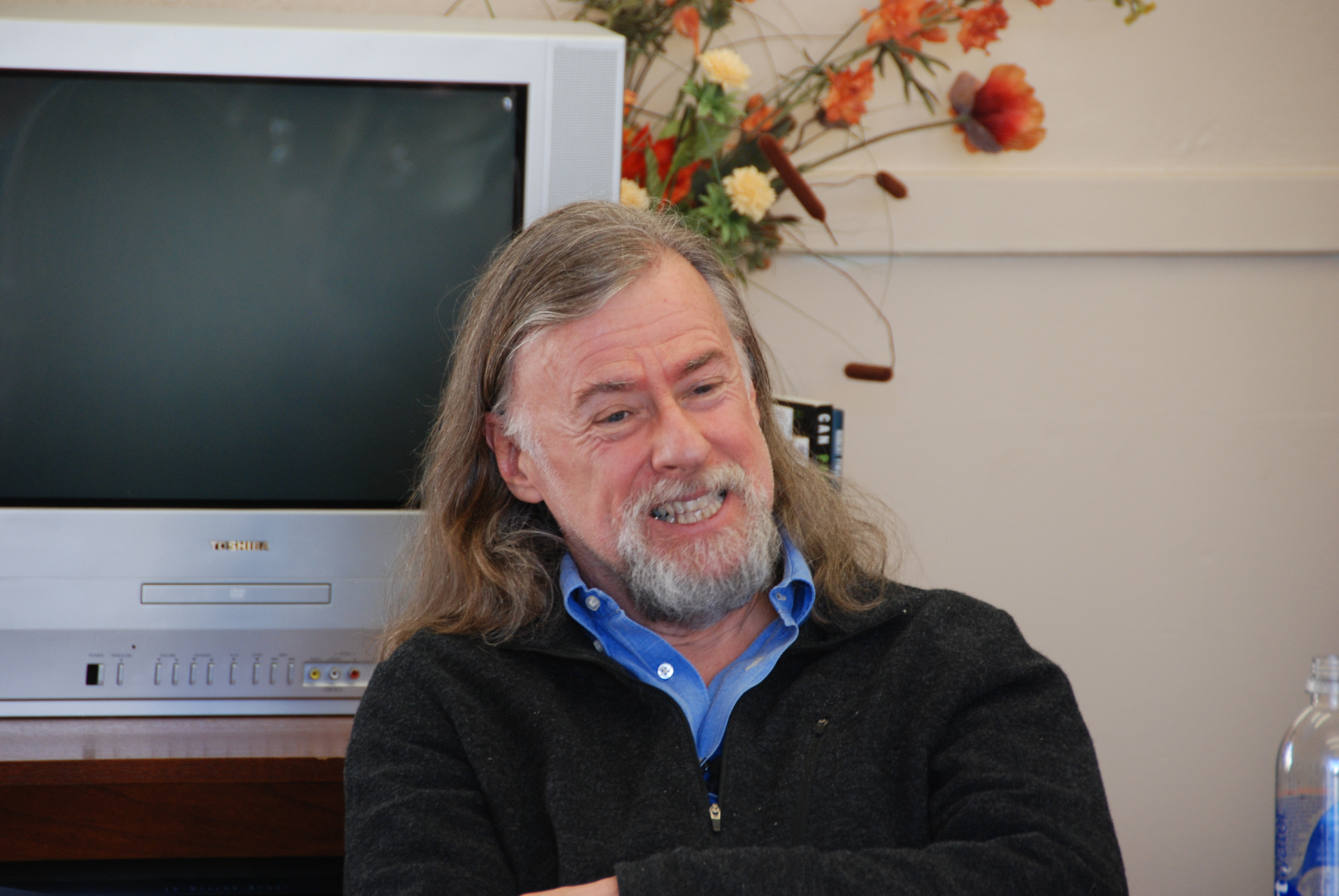
Edmundson in 2012

Mark Edmundson is an American author and professor of English at the University of Virginia. He received a B.A from Bennington College in 1974 and a Ph.D. from Yale University in 1985. Edmundson specializes in Romanticism, Poetry, and 19th-Century English and American Literature. He is the author of sixteen books, and his essays appear in The Wall Street Journal, The Atlantic, Harper's Magazine, The Chronicle of Higher Education, and The New York Times Magazine. Edmundson was awarded a Guggenheim Fellowship and was a National Endowment for the Humanities/Daniels Family Distinguished Teaching Professor at the University of Virginia.

== Literary Criticism ==
=== Towards Reading Freud: Self-Creation in Milton, Wordsworth, Emerson, and Freud ===
Edmundson's first book of literary criticism, Towards Reading Freud: Self-Creation in Milton, Wordsworth, Emerson, and Freud (1990), argues that "there are two dialectically opposed, yet densely interwoven sides to Freud: the 'normative' and the 'Romantic.'" John Neubauer, in Comparative Literary Studies, writes that Towards Reading Freud "ambitiously attempts [...] to read some of Freud's major texts in terms of a dialectic between a romantic, imaginative, literary Freud, and a normative and scientific one."

=== Literature Against Philosophy: Plato to Derrida ===
In Literature Against Philosophy: Plato to Derrida (1995), M. W. Rowe writes in The British Journal of Aesthetics, "Edmundson graciously and intelligently considers both philosophers and literatures that 'challenge us . . . [and] defy our smug Freudian reductions about childhood, our allegiances to systematic thought, our recourse to religious consolation.' At the same time, he helps us decide which philosophers deserve attention, and which, finally, are weak interpreters of, and poor competitors for, the literatures they claim to know."

== Writing about Education ==
=== The Age of Guilt: The Super-Ego in the Online World ===
The Age of Guilt: The Super-Ego in the Online World (2023) is "an opportunity for readers/scholars to view Freud's theory in a modern context and understand how it applies in today's culture. The connections between Freudian scholarship and modern-day culture may offer readers new to the discipline a fascinating experience of cultural criticism." Michael S. Roth, in The Washington Post, writes that Edmundson "is an engaging writer, whether he is describing Freud as heroic ideal, football, reading, teaching or, as part of his discussion in this latest volume, the politics of his students. His tone is friendly yet incisive, more conversational than academic." The Age of Guilt was shortlisted for the 2024 Christian Gauss Award by the Phi Beta Kappa Society.

=== Self and Soul: A Defense of Ideals ===
In Self and Soul: A Defense of Ideals (2015) Edmundson writes, "The profound stories about heroes and saints are passing from our minds." Michael Dirda of The Washington Post describes the book as "an impassioned critique of Western society, a relentless assault on contemporary complacency, shallowness, competitiveness and self-regard." Dirda notes that "Edmundson devotes the first half of 'Self and Soul' to several ancient exemplars of courage, compassion and contemplation, to those who, rejecting a safe and secure passage through life, consecrated themselves to some greater task."

=== The Heart of the Humanities: Reading, Writing, and Teaching ===
The Heart of the Humanities: Reading, Writing, and Teaching (2018) is a collection of three earlier books: Why Read? (2004), Why Teach? In Defense of a Real Education (2013) and Why Write: A Master Class on the Art of Writing and Why it Matters (2016). In the Virginia Quarterly Review, Peter Walpole writes that Why Read? "argues passionately for a return, a rediscovery, of the possibilities great literature has to confront, challenge, and change the receptive reader. Edmundson's 1997 article for Harper's Magazine, "On the Uses of a Liberal Education: As Lite Entertainment for Bored College Students," appears in Why Read? and is one of his most controversial pieces. The Washington Post writes that the article "is said to be the most photocopied essay on college campuses over the last five years, presumably because what Edmundson said in it touched a sensitive nerve." Edmundson's 2007 essay, "Poetry Slam," was also controversial and inspired a response from Ben Lerner, who told The Paris Review that "Poetry Slam" was the reason he wrote his 2016 book, The Hatred of Poetry. Stephen Burt in the Boston Review defended "poets named by Edmundson" in the Harper's Magazine essay. Arthur Krystal defended "Poetry Slam" in his article, "The Missing Music in Today’s Poetry," published in The Chronicle of Higher Education: "I, too, am of Edmundson’s party, but my discontent is more site-specific, tonal rather than dispositive. Simply put: I miss what I used to enjoy." Kirkus Reviews writes that Why Teach? is an examination of "the slow transformation of universities and colleges from being driven by intellectual and cultural betterment to institutions modeled on business, with a complex, and not always successful, emphasis on attracting students and making a profit." Michael S. Roth of The New York Times writes, "If I meet any students heading to the University of Virginia, I will tell them to seek out Mark Edmundson, an English professor and the author of a new collection of essays called 'Why Teach?' For Mr. Edmundson, teaching is a calling, an urgent endeavor in which the lives — he says the souls — of students are at stake."

== Memoirs ==
=== Teacher: The One Who Made the Difference ===
Edmundson's memoirs, Teacher: The One Who Made the Difference (2002), and The Fine Wisdom and Perfect Teachings of the Kings of Rock and Roll (2010), chronicle his early education at Medford High School (Massachusetts) and Bennington College. Teacher: The One Who Made the Difference, was a New York Times Notable Book of the Year and describes how "Edmundson's high school philosophy teacher, Franklin Lears, transformed Edmundson in one semester from a teenage thug into the sort of man who could grow up to be an English professor at the University of Virginia."

=== The Fine Wisdom and Perfect Teachings of the Kings of Rock and Roll ===
Kirkus Reviews calls The Fine Wisdom and Perfect Teachings of the Kings of Rock and Roll a "near-perfect memoir," an "erudite, coming-of-age riot," in which Edmundson describes working as a taxi driver, stage-crew, and a bouncer in New York City. In The Fine Wisdom and Perfect Teachings of the Kings of Rock and Roll, "the author revels in his renaissance-manliness [...] and proves to be an honest, poetic and hilariously entertaining narrator."

== Books ==
- The Age of Guilt: The Super-Ego in the Online World. Yale University Press, 2023.
- Song of Ourselves: Walt Whitman and the Fight for Democracy. Harvard University Press, 2021.
- The Heart of the Humanities: Reading, Writing, Teaching. Bloomsbury Publishing, 2018.
- Why Write? Bloomsbury Publishing, 2016.
- Self and Soul: A Defense of Ideals. Harvard University Press, 2015.
- Why Football Matters: My Education in the Game. Penguin Press, 2014
- Why Teach? Bloomsbury Publishing, 2013.
- The Fine Wisdom and Perfect Teachings of the Kings of Rock and Roll. HarperCollins, 2010.
- The Death of Sigmund Freud: Fascism, Psychoanalysis and the Rise of Fundamentalism. London: Bloomsbury, 2007.
- The Death of Sigmund Freud: The Legacy of His Last Days. New York: Bloomsbury, 2007.
- Why Read? Bloomsbury Publishing, 2004.
- Teacher: The One Who Made the Difference. Random House, 2002.
- Nightmare on Main Street. Harvard University Press, 1997.
- Literature Against Philosophy, Plato to Derrida. Cambridge University Press, 1995.
- Wild Orchids and Trotsky (Editor). Penguin, 1993.
- Towards Reading Freud. Princeton University Press, 1990.
