= Sault Memorial Gardens =

Former indoor ice hockey arena in Sault Ste. Marie, Ontario

Coordinates: 46°30′49″N 84°20′13″W

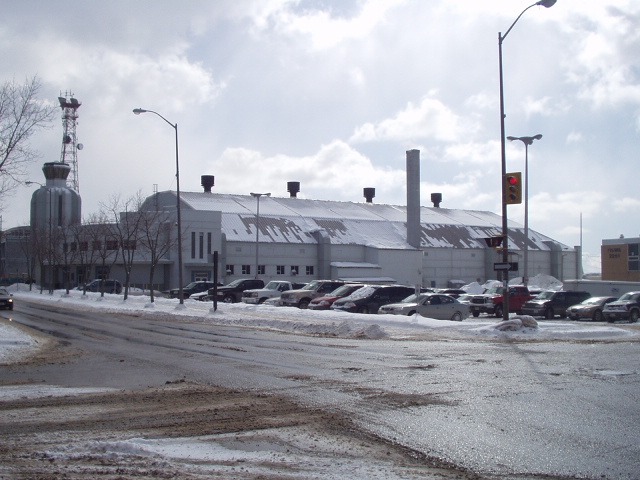
- Interactive map of Sault Memorial Gardens
- Location: 269 Queen Street East; Sault Ste. Marie, Ontario, Canada
- Owner: City of Sault Ste. Marie
- Capacity: 3,990
- Field size: 200 x 85 ft.

Construction
- Groundbreaking: September 18, 1946
- Opened: February 20, 1949
- Demolished: 2006
- Cost: $765,000 CAD

Tenants
- Sault Ste. Marie Greyhounds; 1962–2006

The Sault Memorial Gardens was a former ice hockey arena in Sault Ste. Marie, Ontario, for 57 years from 1949 to 2006. It was located in the heart of the downtown district at 169 Queen Street. The Gardens was one of the first Northern Ontario arenas to have artificial ice, and seated 3,990 spectators.

== Photo gallery ==
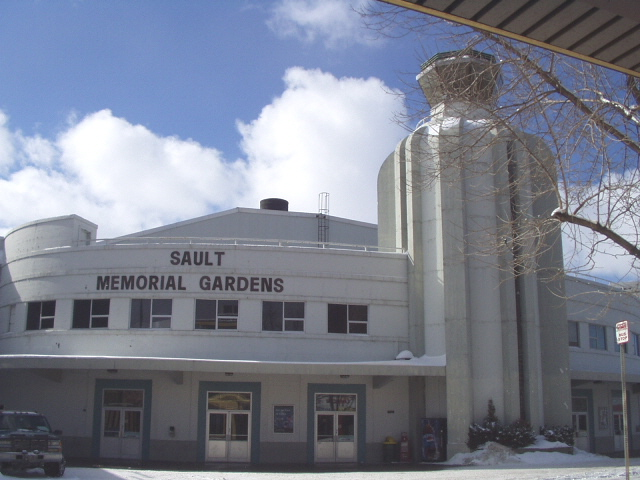
Front entrance.

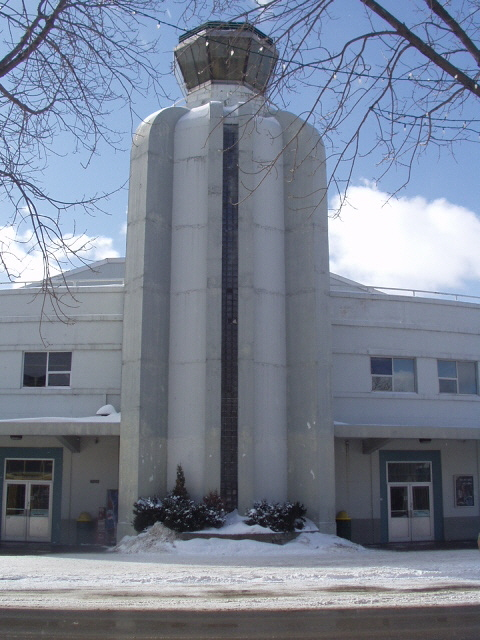
Memorial Tower.

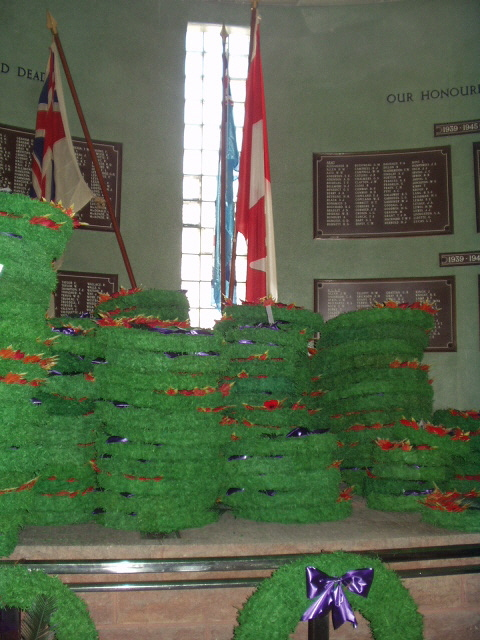
Memorial Tower interior, north wall.

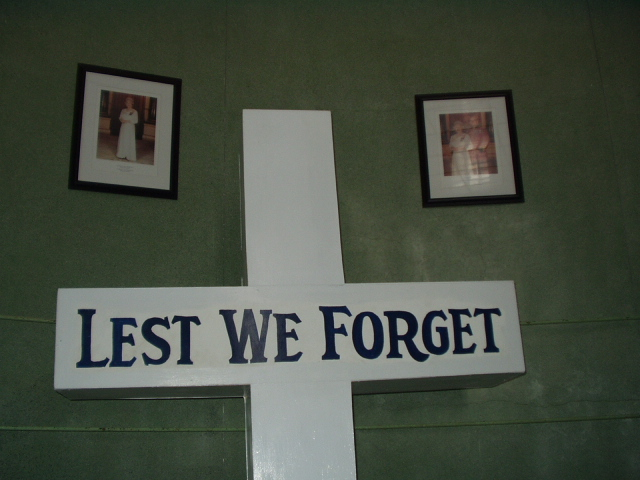
Memorial Tower interior, south wall.

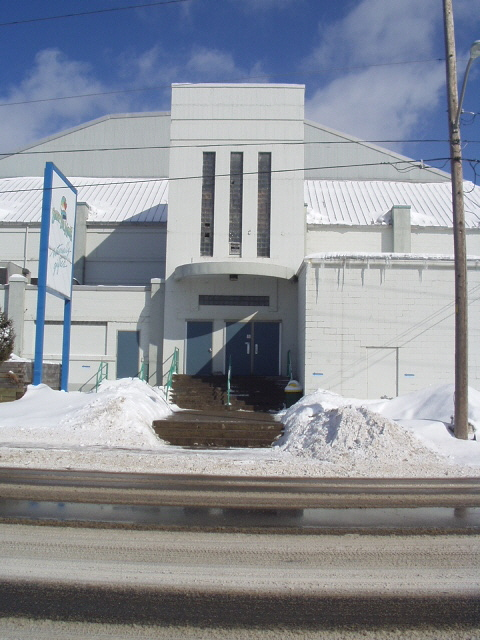
South entrance.

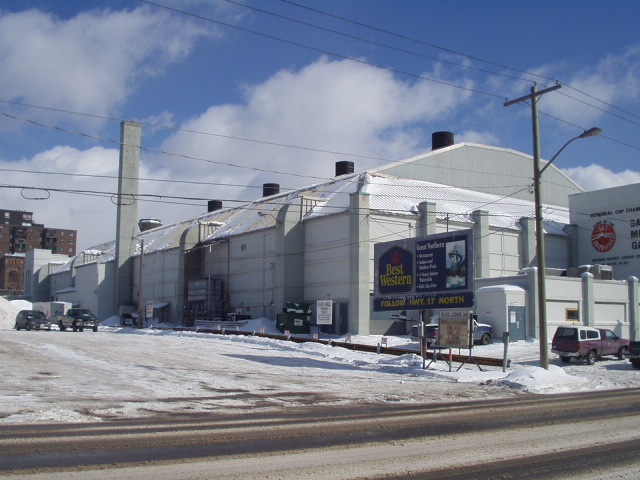
Exterior from the southwest.

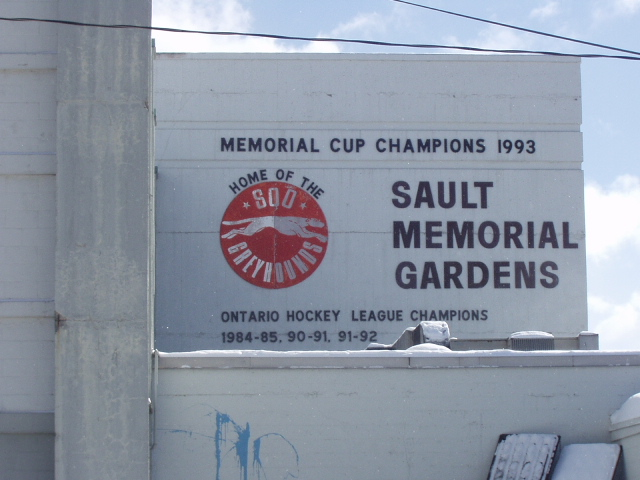
Championships at south entrance.

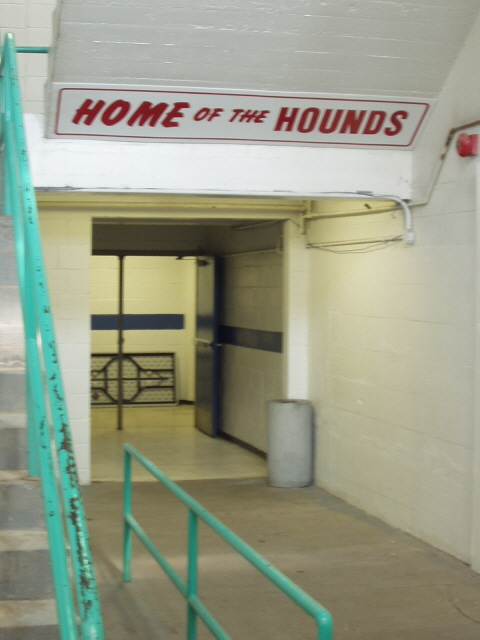
South end stairs.

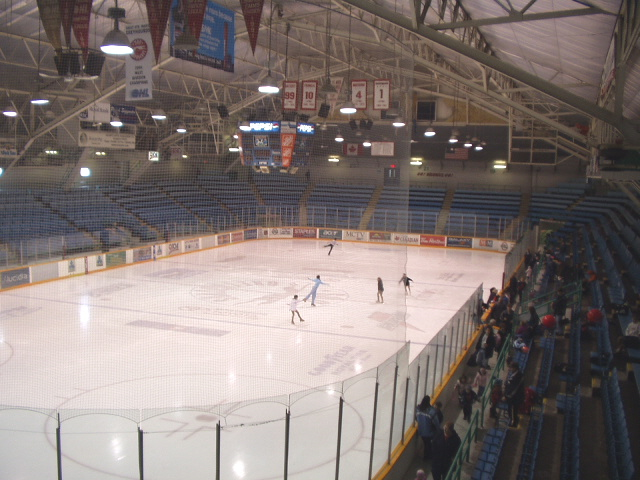
Interior from the northwest.

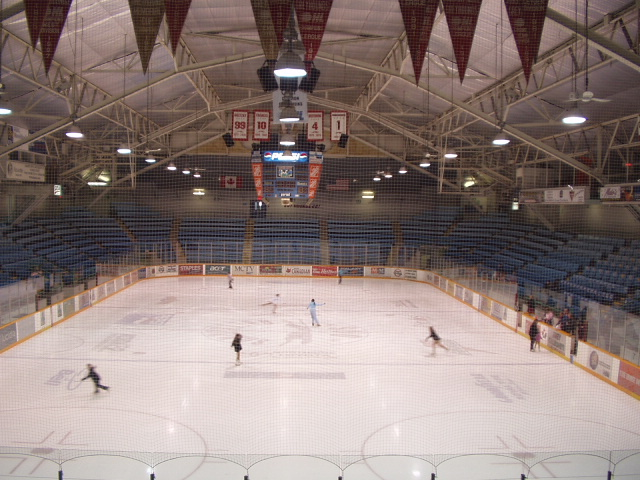
Interior from the north.

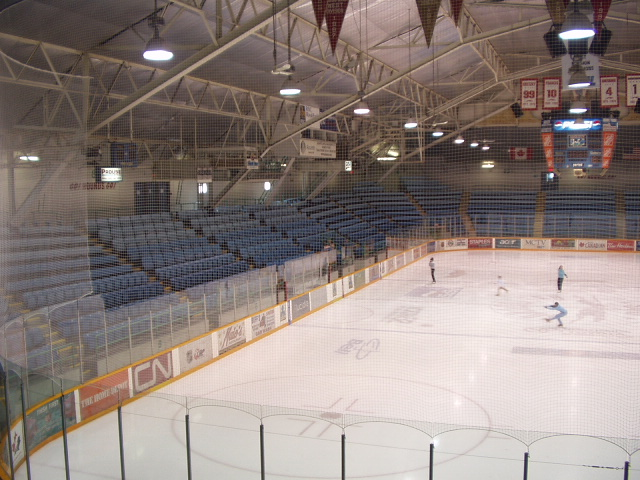
Interior from the northeast.

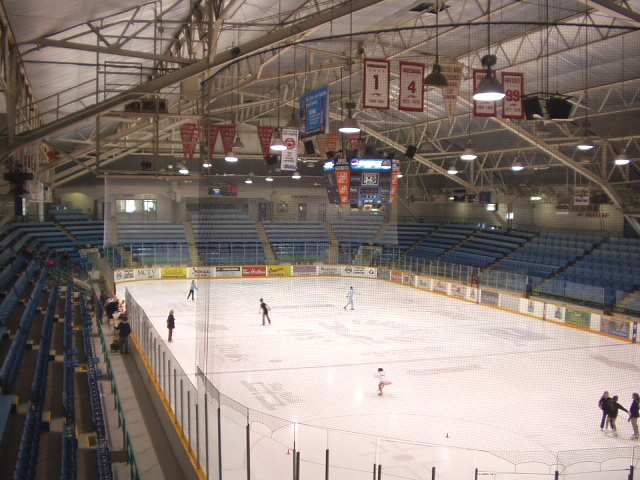
Interior from the southwest.

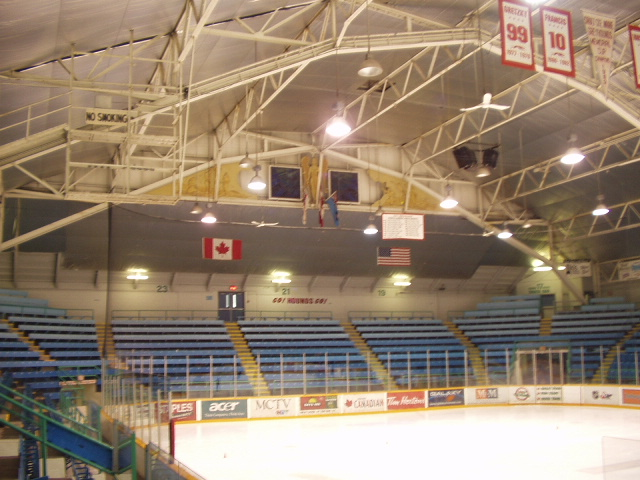
South end of gardens.

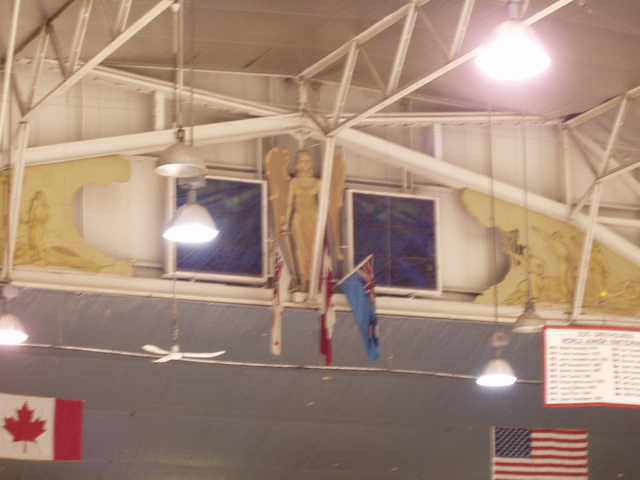
Memorial fresco, with angels and lighted glass windows.

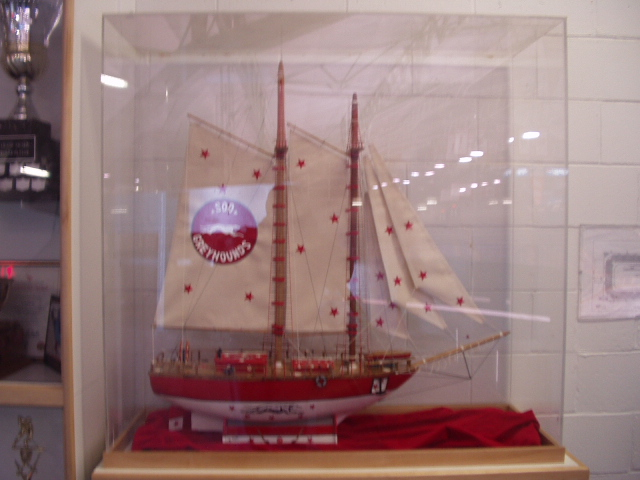
Model ship in trophy case.

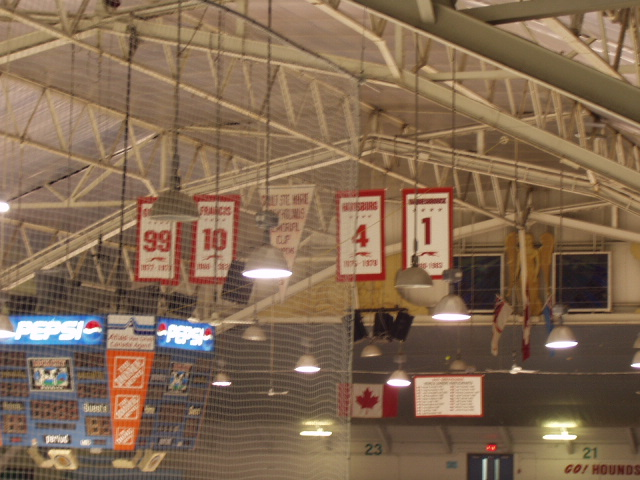
Retired numbers in the rafters.

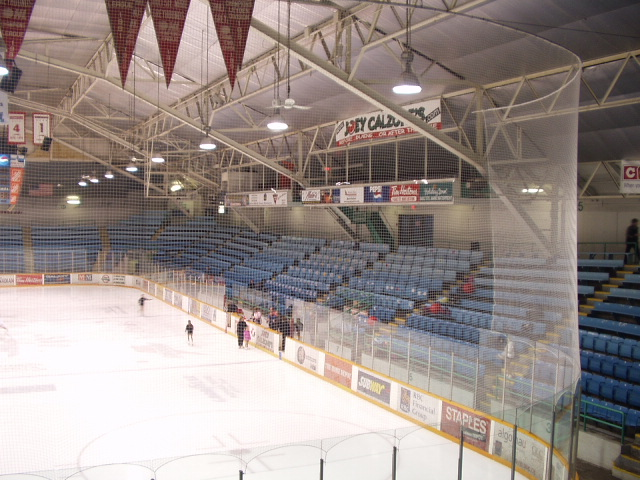
West side press boxes.

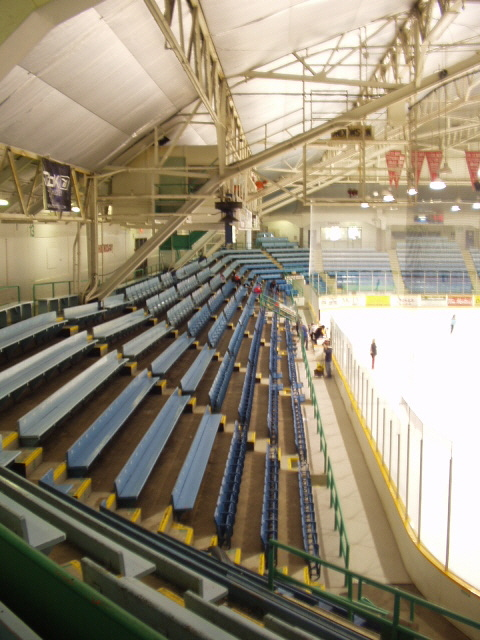
West side seating.

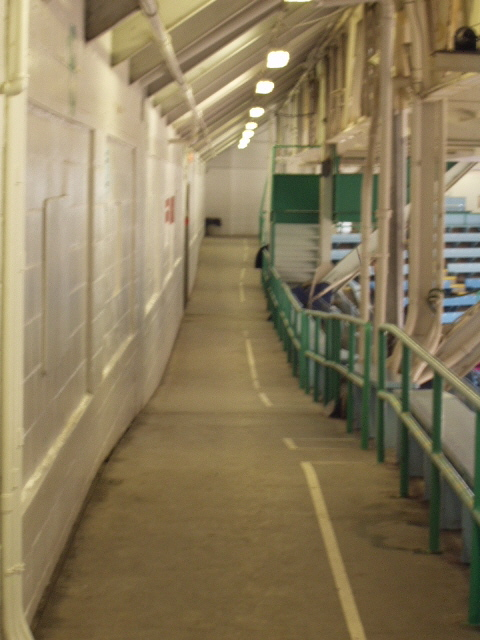
West side hallway with "dip" in floor.

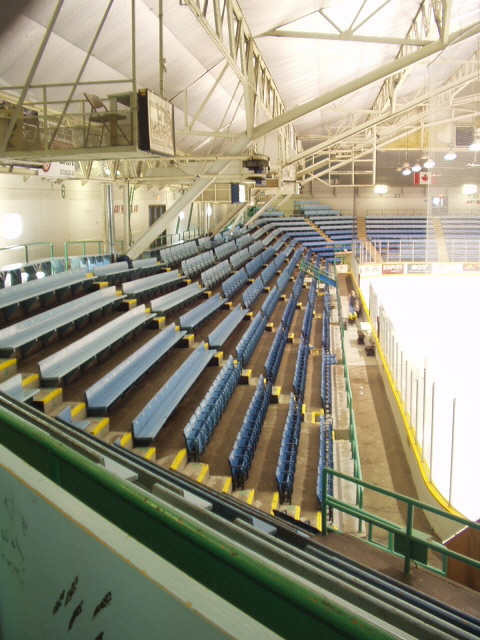
East side seating.

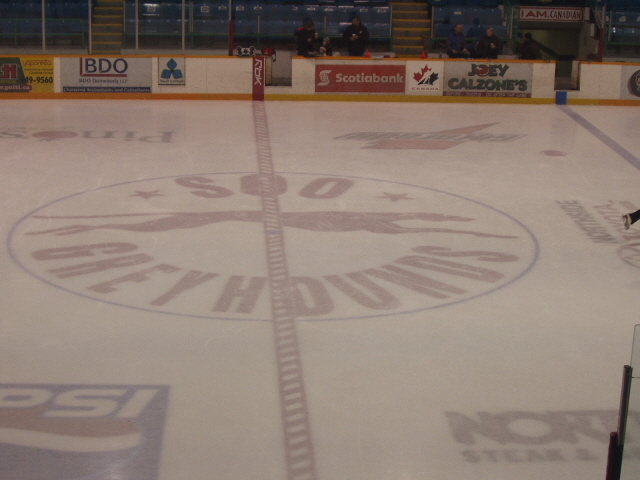
Centre ice logo.

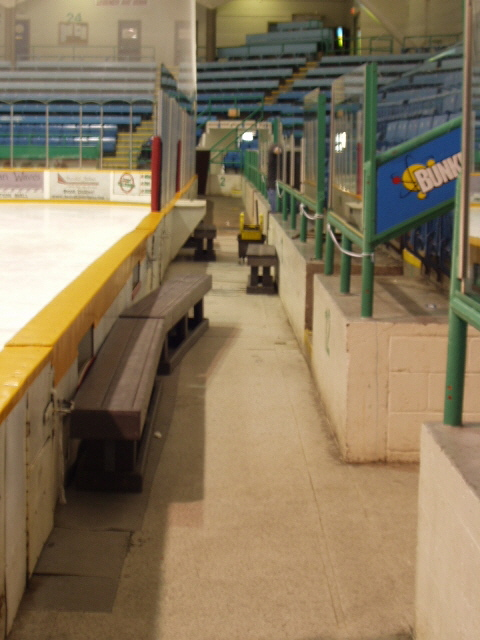
Greyhounds bench and penalty boxes.

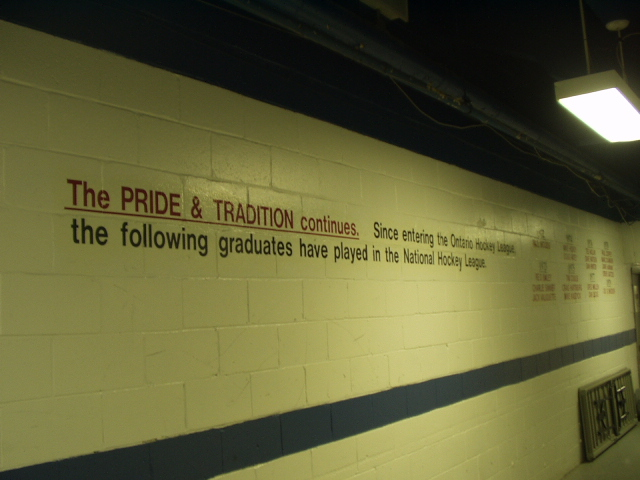
Greyhounds wall of honour.

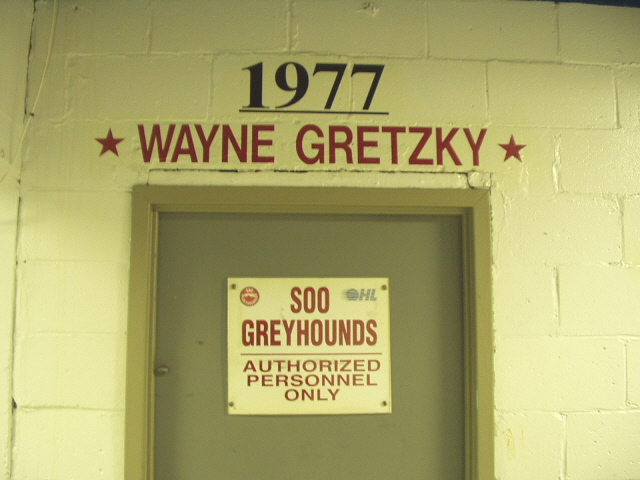
Wayne Gretzky's name on the wall.

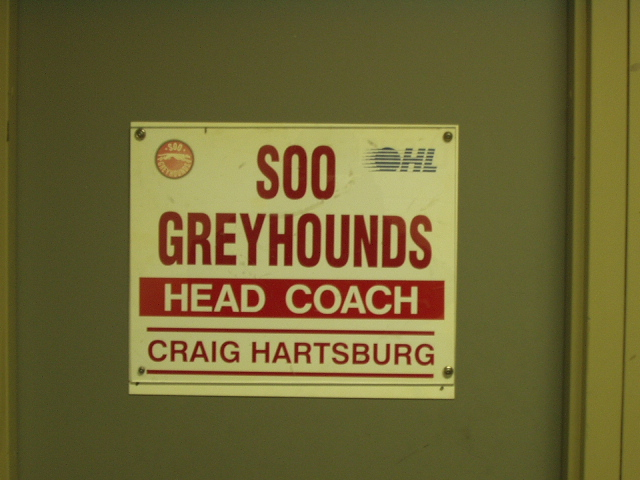
Craig Hartsburg's name plate.

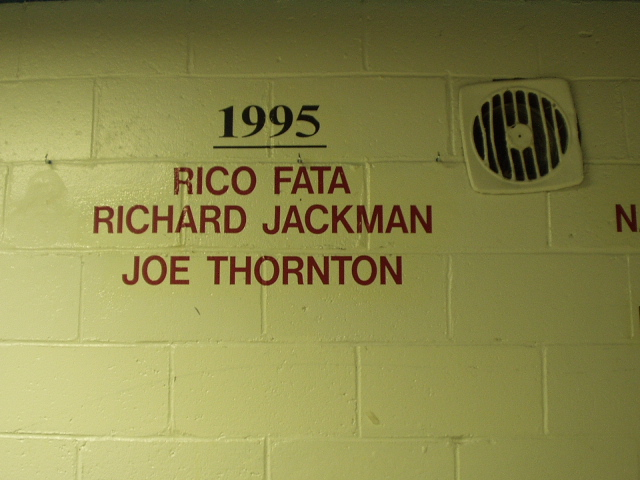
Joe Thornton's name on the wall.

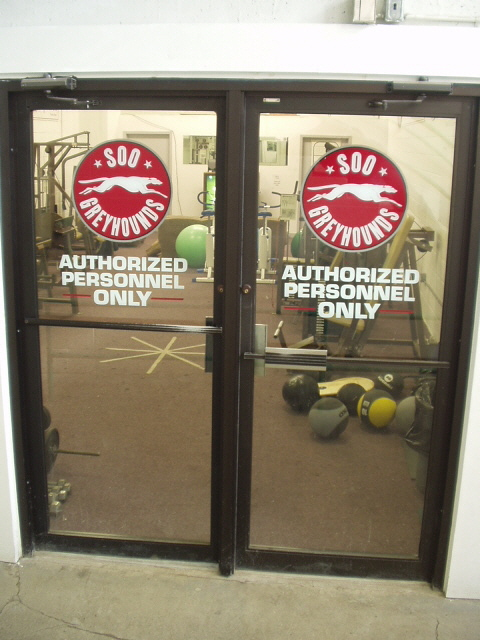
Greyhounds players' lounge / exercise room.

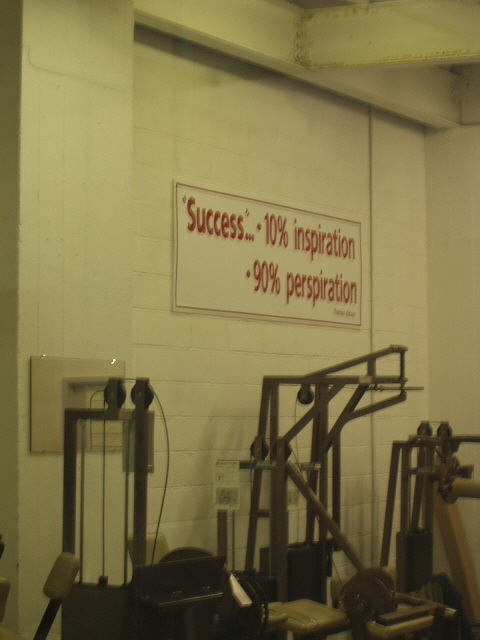
Team motto on wall of lounge.

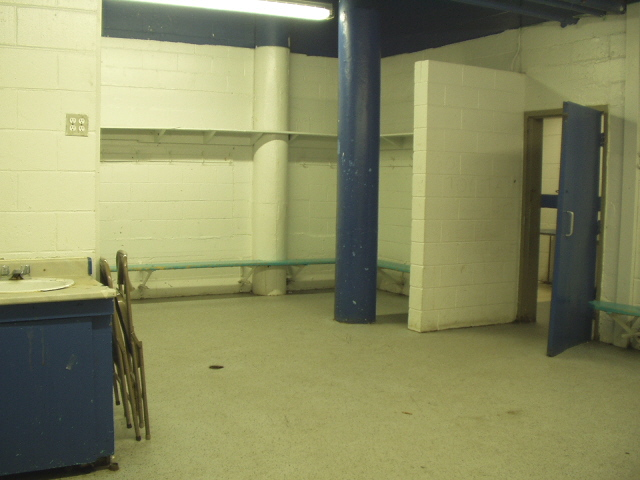
Visitor's dressing room.
