= 1984–85 OHL season =

Junior ice hockey season

The 1984–85 OHL season was the fifth season of the Ontario Hockey League. The Sault Ste. Marie Greyhounds were undefeated in all 33 home games during the regular season. The Brantford Alexanders moved back to Hamilton, becoming the Hamilton Steelhawks. Fifteen teams each played 66 games. The Sault Ste. Marie Greyhounds won the J. Ross Robertson Cup, defeating the Peterborough Petes.

== Relocation/Team Name Change ==
=== Brantford Alexanders to Hamilton Steelhawks ===
The Brantford Alexanders relocated and moved back to the city of Hamilton for the 1984-85 season. The franchise had previously played in Hamilton from 1953-1976 as the Hamilton Tiger Cubs from 1953-1960, and the Hamilton Fincups from 1960-1976. In 1976, the franchise relocated to St. Catharines and played as the St. Catharines Fincups for the 1976-77 season, however, the club returned to Hamilton for the 1977-78 season. The club then relocated to Brantford and was renamed as the Brantford Alexanders for the 1978-79 season.

The Steelhawks would play the 1984-85 season out of Mountain Arena while their new arena, Copps Coliseum, was being constructed and would not open until the 1985-86 season. The team remained in the Emms Division.

=== Windsor Spitfires to Windsor Compuware Spitfires ===
The Windsor Spitfires were bought by Peter Karmanos, the founder and CEO of Compuware in 1984 and were renamed as the Windsor Compuware Spitfires beginning in the 1984-85 season.

== Tragedy ==
On January 4, 1985, Bruce Melanson of the Oshawa Generals collapsed at practice and died from a heart ailment known as Wolff-Parkinson-White syndrome which resulted in him having a rapid heartbeat because of electrical impulses in the heart taking extra pathways. He was 18 years old at the time of the incident. Melanson was a second round draft pick of the New York Islanders at the 1984 NHL entry draft.

The Generals wore black arm bands for the remainder of the season in memoriam of their teammate. In his memory, the club no longer issues the uniform number "9". A memorial scholarship was also set up at his former high school in New Brunswick.

== Regular season ==
=== Final standings ===
Note: GP = Games played; W = Wins; L = Losses; T = Ties; GF = Goals for; GA = Goals against; PTS = Points; x = clinched playoff berth; y = clinched division title

=== Leyden Division ===
| Rank | Team | GP | W | L | T | PTS | GF | GA |
|---|---|---|---|---|---|---|---|---|
| 1 | y-Peterborough Petes | 66 | 42 | 20 | 4 | 88 | 354 | 233 |
| 2 | x-Belleville Bulls | 66 | 42 | 24 | 0 | 84 | 390 | 278 |
| 3 | x-Toronto Marlboros | 66 | 35 | 28 | 3 | 73 | 315 | 302 |
| 4 | x-Cornwall Royals | 66 | 34 | 30 | 2 | 70 | 355 | 344 |
| 5 | x-Oshawa Generals | 66 | 32 | 32 | 2 | 66 | 271 | 259 |
| 6 | x-Ottawa 67's | 66 | 20 | 43 | 3 | 43 | 263 | 376 |
| 7 | Kingston Canadians | 66 | 18 | 47 | 1 | 37 | 239 | 380 |

=== Emms Division ===
| Rank | Team | GP | W | L | T | PTS | GF | GA |
|---|---|---|---|---|---|---|---|---|
| 1 | y-Sault Ste. Marie Greyhounds | 66 | 54 | 11 | 1 | 109 | 381 | 215 |
| 2 | x-London Knights | 66 | 43 | 22 | 1 | 87 | 340 | 276 |
| 3 | x-North Bay Centennials | 66 | 34 | 28 | 4 | 72 | 289 | 254 |
| 4 | x-Hamilton Steelhawks | 66 | 29 | 35 | 2 | 60 | 313 | 296 |
| 5 | x-Windsor Compuware Spitfires | 66 | 28 | 35 | 3 | 59 | 267 | 301 |
| 6 | x-Kitchener Rangers | 66 | 27 | 35 | 4 | 58 | 282 | 319 |
| 7 | Guelph Platers | 66 | 21 | 40 | 5 | 47 | 230 | 332 |
| 8 | Sudbury Wolves | 66 | 17 | 46 | 3 | 37 | 224 | 348 |

=== Scoring leaders ===
| Player | Team | GP | G | A | Pts | PIM |
|---|---|---|---|---|---|---|
| Dave MacLean | Belleville Bulls | 63 | 64 | 90 | 154 | 41 |
| Wayne Groulx | Sault Ste. Marie Greyhounds | 64 | 59 | 85 | 144 | 102 |
| Steve Linseman | Hamilton Steelhawks/Belleville Bulls | 61 | 57 | 83 | 140 | 28 |
| Graeme Bonar | Sault Ste. Marie Greyhounds | 66 | 66 | 71 | 137 | 93 |
| Mark Teevens | Peterborough Petes | 65 | 43 | 90 | 133 | 70 |
| Mike Millar | Hamilton Steelhawks | 63 | 66 | 60 | 126 | 54 |
| Scott Tottle | Peterborough Petes | 64 | 55 | 71 | 126 | 19 |
| Dave Lowry | London Knights | 61 | 60 | 60 | 120 | 94 |
| Don Biggs | Oshawa Generals | 60 | 48 | 69 | 117 | 105 |
| Mike Bukowski | Cornwall Royals | 62 | 53 | 54 | 107 | 72 |

== Playoffs ==
Division quarter-finals
L1 | Peterborough | 9
L6 | Ottawa | 1
L2 | Belleville | 8
L5 | Oshawa | 2
L3 | Toronto | 2
L4 | Cornwall | 8
E1 | Sault Ste. Marie | 8
E6 | Kitchener | 0
E2 | London | 8
E5 | Windsor | 0
E3 | North Bay | 7
E4 | Hamilton | 9

Division semi-finals
L1 | Peterborough | bye
L2 | Belleville | 6
L4 | Cornwall | 2
E1 | Sault Ste. Marie | bye
E2 | London | 2
E4 | Hamilton | 6

Division finals
L1 | Peterborough | 9
L2 | Belleville | 1
E1 | Sault Ste. Marie | 9
E4 | Hamilton | 1

J. Ross Robertson Cup
L1 | Peterborough | 5
E1 | Sault Ste. Marie | 9

=== Division quarter-finals ===
==== Leyden Division ====
===== (1) Peterborough Petes vs. (6) Ottawa 67's =====
| March 19 | Ottawa 67's | 2 – 7 | Peterborough Petes | Peterborough Memorial Centre |

| March 21 | Ottawa 67's | 2 – 5 | Peterborough Petes | Peterborough Memorial Centre |

| March 22 | Peterborough Petes | 4 – 4 | Ottawa 67's | Ottawa Civic Centre |

| March 24 | Peterborough Petes | 4 – 3 | Ottawa 67's | Ottawa Civic Centre |

| March 25 | Ottawa 67's | 4 – 6 | Peterborough Petes | Peterborough Memorial Centre |

| Peterborough wins series 9 – 1 |

===== (2) Belleville Bulls vs. (5) Oshawa Generals =====
| March 20 | Oshawa Generals | 6 – 4 | Belleville Bulls | Yardmen Arena |

| March 21 | Belleville Bulls | 2 – 0 | Oshawa Generals | Oshawa Civic Auditorium |

| March 23 | Oshawa Generals | 1 – 6 | Belleville Bulls | Yardmen Arena |

| March 24 | Belleville Bulls | 5 – 4 | Oshawa Generals | Oshawa Civic Auditorium |

| March 27 | Oshawa Generals | 4 – 6 | Belleville Bulls | Yardmen Arena |

| Belleville wins series 8 – 2 |

===== (3) Toronto Marlboros vs. (4) Cornwall Royals =====
| March 19 | Cornwall Royals | 4 – 3 | Toronto Marlboros | Maple Leaf Gardens |

| March 21 | Toronto Marlboros | 5 – 2 | Cornwall Royals | Cornwall Civic Complex |

| March 24 | Cornwall Royals | 6 – 5 | Toronto Marlboros | Maple Leaf Gardens |

| March 26 | Toronto Marlboros | 5 – 9 | Cornwall Royals | Cornwall Civic Complex |

| March 28 | Cornwall Royals | 8 – 5 | Toronto Marlboros | Maple Leaf Gardens |

| Cornwall wins series 8 – 2 |

==== Emms Division ====
===== (1) Sault Ste. Marie Greyhounds vs. (6) Kitchener Rangers =====
| March 20 | Kitchener Rangers | 1 – 6 | Sault Ste. Marie Greyhounds | Sault Memorial Gardens |
| 14:29 - Shawn Burr (1) | | First period | 2:14 - Mike Oliverio (1); 13:29 - Graeme Bonar (1); 19:45 - pp - Graeme Bonar (2) |
| No scoring | | Second period | 12:19 - sh - Chris Brant (1); 18:34 - Mike Oliverio (2) |
| No scoring | | Third period | 3:03 - Wayne Presley (1) |
| Mike Bishop (26 saves/32 shots) | | Goalie stats | Marty Abrams (21 saves/22 shots) |

| March 22 | Kitchener Rangers | 2 – 10 | Sault Ste. Marie Greyhounds | Sault Memorial Gardens |
| 19:03 - David Latta (1) | | First period | 3:44 - Brit Peer (1); 8:23 - Wayne Groulx (1) |
| 14:38 - Ken Alexander (1) | | Second period | 1:27 - Wayne Presley (2); 5:25 - Wayne Presley (3); 8:45 - Wayne Groulx (2); 16:03 - pp - Mike Oliverio (3); 18:57 - Graeme Bonar (3) |
| No scoring | | Third period | 11:48 - Graeme Bonar (4); 19:02 - Jean-Marc MacKenzie (1); 19:21 - Jean-Marc MacKenzie (2) |
| Mike Bishop (28 saves/38 shots) | | Goalie stats | Scott Mosey (25 saves/27 shots) |

| March 24 | Sault Ste. Marie Greyhounds | 11 – 7 | Kitchener Rangers | Kitchener Memorial Auditorium |
| 11:27 - Wayne Presley (4); 14:55 - Wayne Presley (5) | | First period | No scoring |
| 3:04 - Jeff Beukeboom (1); 4:53 - pp - Graeme Bonar (5); 8:04 - Brit Peer (2); 11:37 - Brit Peer (3); 12:37 - Wayne Groulx (3); 16:46 - Bob Probert (1); 19:58 - Wayne Groulx (4) | | Second period | 0:40 - pp - Kent Paynter (1); 1:09 - Mike Stevens (1); 1:43 - Craig Wolanin (1); 6:41 - Doug Stromback (1); 10:02 - pp - Kent Paynter (2); 16:28 - pp - Brian Wilks (1); 19:22 - Brian Wilks (2) |
| 5:03 - Graeme Bonar (6); 8:55 - pp - Wayne Groulx (5) | | Third period | No scoring |
| Marty Abrams and Scott Mosey (26 saves/33 shots) | | Goalie stats | Mike Bishop and David Weiss (28 saves/39 shots) |

| March 26 | Sault Ste. Marie Greyhounds | 5 – 4 | Kitchener Rangers | Kitchener Memorial Auditorium |
| 13:40 - sh - Wayne Groulx (6); 15:56 - Chris Felix (1) | | First period | 2:40 - Shawn Burr (2); 4:33 - sh - Shawn Burr (3) |
| 11:59 - Jean-Marc MacKenzie (3) | | Second period | 0:17 - pp - David Latta (2) |
| 16:31 - Steve Hollett (1); 18:16 - Jeff Beukeboom (2) | | Third period | 16:51 - Doug Stromback (2) |
| Scott Mosey (33 saves/37 shots) | | Goalie stats | David Weiss (37 saves/42 shots) |

| Sault Ste. Marie wins series 8 – 0 |

===== (2) London Knights vs. (5) Windsor Compuware Spitfires =====
| March 19 | Windsor Compuware Spitfires | 1 – 6 | London Knights | London Gardens |

| March 21 | London Knights | 3 – 2 | Windsor Compuware Spitfires | Windsor Arena |

| March 22 | Windsor Compuware Spitfires | 0 – 8 | London Knights | London Gardens |

| March 25 | London Knights | 6 – 1 | Windsor Compuware Spitfires | Windsor Arena |

| London wins series 8 – 0 |

===== (3) North Bay Centennials vs. (4) Hamilton Steelhawks =====
| March 19 | Hamilton Steelhawks | 6 – 2 | North Bay Centennials | North Bay Memorial Gardens |

| March 21 | North Bay Centennials | 4 – 5 | Hamilton Steelhawks | Mountain Arena |

| March 24 | Hamilton Steelhawks | 8 – 8 | North Bay Centennials | North Bay Memorial Gardens |

| March 26 | North Bay Centennials | 4 – 5 | Hamilton Steelhawks | Mountain Arena |

| March 28 | Hamilton Steelhawks | 5 – 8 | North Bay Centennials | North Bay Memorial Gardens |

| March 29 | North Bay Centennials | 6 – 1 | Hamilton Steelhawks | Mountain Arena |

| March 31 | Hamilton Steelhawks | 1 – 6 | North Bay Centennials | North Bay Memorial Gardens |

| April 1 | North Bay Centennials | 3 – 4 | OT | Hamilton Steelhawks | Mountain Arena |

| Hamilton wins series 9 – 7 |

=== Division semi-finals ===
==== Leyden Division ====
===== (2) Belleville Bulls vs. (4) Cornwall Royals =====
| April 3 | Cornwall Royals | 3 – 2 | Belleville Bulls | Yardmen Arena |

| April 4 | Belleville Bulls | 9 – 5 | Cornwall Royals | Cornwall Civic Complex |

| April 6 | Cornwall Royals | 1 – 5 | Belleville Bulls | Yardmen Arena |

| April 8 | Belleville Bulls | 7 – 4 | Cornwall Royals | Cornwall Civic Complex |

| Belleville wins series 6 – 2 |

==== Emms Division ====
===== (2) London Knights vs. (4) Hamilton Steelhawks =====
| April 2 | Hamilton Steelhawks | 5 – 3 | London Knights | London Gardens |

| April 4 | London Knights | 5 – 8 | Hamilton Steelhawks | Mountain Arena |

| April 5 | Hamilton Steelhawks | 3 – 7 | London Knights | London Gardens |

| April 9 | London Knights | 3 – 6 | Hamilton Steelhawks | Mountain Arena |

| Hamilton wins series 6 – 2 |

=== Division finals ===
==== Leyden Division ====
===== (1) Peterborough Petes vs. (2) Belleville Bulls =====
| April 11 | Belleville Bulls | 2 – 6 | Peterborough Petes | Peterborough Memorial Centre |

| April 13 | Peterborough Petes | 4 – 3 | Belleville Bulls | Yardmen Arena |

| April 14 | Belleville Bulls | 1 – 4 | Peterborough Petes | Peterborough Memorial Centre |

| April 17 | Peterborough Petes | 4 – 4 | Belleville Bulls | Yardmen Arena |

| April 18 | Belleville Bulls | 3 – 6 | Peterborough Petes | Peterborough Memorial Centre |

| Peterborough wins series 9 – 1 |

==== Emms Division ====
===== (1) Sault Ste. Marie Greyhounds vs. (4) Hamilton Steelhawks =====
| April 12 | Hamilton Steelhawks | 4 – 6 | Sault Ste. Marie Greyhounds | Sault Memorial Gardens |

| April 14 | Sault Ste. Marie Greyhounds | 6 – 4 | Hamilton Steelhawks | Mountain Arena |

| April 16 | Hamilton Steelhawks | 2 – 8 | Sault Ste. Marie Greyhounds | Sault Memorial Gardens |

| April 18 | Sault Ste. Marie Greyhounds | 4 – 4 | Hamilton Steelhawks | Mountain Arena |

| April 20 | Hamilton Steelhawks | 0 – 7 | Sault Ste. Marie Greyhounds | Sault Memorial Gardens |

| Sault Ste. Marie wins series 9 – 1 |

=== J. Ross Robertson Cup ===
==== (E1) Sault Ste. Marie Greyhounds vs. (L1) Peterborough Petes ====
| April 25 | Peterborough Petes | 3 – 3 | Sault Ste. Marie Greyhounds | Sault Memorial Gardens |

| April 26 | Peterborough Petes | 5 – 3 | Sault Ste. Marie Greyhounds | Sault Memorial Gardens |

| April 28 | Sault Ste. Marie Greyhounds | 6 – 5 | Peterborough Petes | Peterborough Memorial Centre |

| April 29 | Sault Ste. Marie Greyhounds | 5 – 2 | Peterborough Petes | Peterborough Memorial Centre |

| May 2 | Peterborough Petes | 7 – 5 | Sault Ste. Marie Greyhounds | Sault Memorial Gardens |

| May 4 | Sault Ste. Marie Greyhounds | 4 – 3 | Peterborough Petes | Peterborough Memorial Centre |

| May 6 | Peterborough Petes | 2 – 5 | Sault Ste. Marie Greyhounds | Sault Memorial Gardens |

| Sault Ste. Marie wins series 9 – 5 |

== Awards ==
| J. Ross Robertson Cup: | Sault Ste. Marie Greyhounds |
| Hamilton Spectator Trophy: | Sault Ste. Marie Greyhounds |
| Leyden Trophy: | Peterborough Petes |
| Emms Trophy: | Sault Ste. Marie Greyhounds |
| Red Tilson Trophy: | Wayne Groulx, Sault Ste. Marie Greyhounds |
| Eddie Powers Memorial Trophy: | Dave MacLean, Belleville Bulls |
| Matt Leyden Trophy: | Terry Crisp, Sault Ste. Marie Greyhounds |
| Jim Mahon Memorial Trophy: | Dave MacLean, Sault Ste. Marie Greyhounds |
| Max Kaminsky Trophy: | Bob Halkidis, London Knights |
| Jack Ferguson Award: | Bryan Fogarty, Kingston Canadians |
| Dave Pinkney Trophy: | Scott Mosey and Marty Abrams, Sault Ste. Marie Greyhounds |
| Emms Family Award: | Derek King, Sault Ste. Marie Greyhounds |
| F.W. 'Dinty' Moore Trophy: | Ron Tugnutt, Peterborough Petes |
| William Hanley Trophy: | Scott Tottle, Peterborough Petes |
| Leo Lalonde Memorial Trophy: | Dunc MacIntyre, Belleville Bulls |
| Bobby Smith Trophy: | Craig Billington, Belleville Bulls |

== 1985 OHL Priority Selection ==
The Kingston Canadians held the first overall pick in the 1985 Ontario Priority Selection and selected Bryan Fogarty from the Aurora Tigers. Fogarty was awarded the Jack Ferguson Award, awarded to the top pick in the draft.

Below are the players who were selected in the first round of the 1985 Ontario Hockey League Priority Selection.

| # | Player | Nationality | OHL Team | Hometown | Minor Team |
|---|---|---|---|---|---|
| 1 | Bryan Fogarty (D) | Canada | Kingston Canadians | Brantford, Ontario | Aurora Tigers |
| 2 | Ken McRae (C) | Canada | Sudbury Wolves | Finch, Ontario | Hawkesbury Hawks |
| 3 | Lonnie Loach (LW) | Canada | Guelph Platers | New Liskeard, Ontario | St. Mary's Lincolns |
| 4 | Danny Hie (C) | Canada | Ottawa 67's | Mississauga, Ontario | North York Red Wings |
| 5 | Mike Wolak (C) | United States | Kitchener Rangers | Utica, Michigan | Detroit Compuware |
| 6 | Adam Graves (C) | Canada | Windsor Compuware Spitfires | Toronto, Ontario | King City Dukes |
| 7 | Don Pancoe (D) | Canada | Hamilton Steelhawks | St. George, Ontario | Cambridge Winterhawks |
| 8 | Marc Laniel (D) | Canada | Oshawa Generals | Scarborough, Ontario | Toronto Red Wings |
| 9 | Steve Herniman (D) | Canada | Cornwall Royals | Kitchener, Ontario | Kitchener Rangers Midget |
| 10 | Adam Burt (D) | United States | North Bay Centennials | Detroit, Michigan | Detroit Compuware |
| 11 | Sean Davidson (RW) | Canada | Toronto Marlboros | Milton, Ontario | Toronto Young Nationals |
| 12 | Bryan Marchment (D) | Canada | Belleville Bulls | Scarborough, Ontario | Toronto Young Nationals |
| 13 | Brendan Shanahan (C) | Canada | London Knights | Mimico, Ontario | Mississauga Reps |
| 14 | Jody Hull (RW) | Canada | Peterborough Petes | Cambridge, Ontario | Cambridge Winterhawks |
| 15 | Steve Bisson (D) | Canada | Sault Ste. Marie Greyhounds | Ottawa, Ontario | Ottawa Jr. Senators |

== See also ==
- List of OHA Junior A standings
- List of OHL seasons
- 1985 Memorial Cup
- 1985 NHL entry draft
- 1984 in sports
- 1985 in sports

| Preceded by 1983–84 OHL season | OHL seasons | Succeeded by 1985–86 OHL season |
