= Kirk Tomlinson =

- Born: May 2, 1968 (age 57) Toronto, Ontario, Canada
- Height: 5 ft 11 in (180 cm)
- Weight: 190 lb (86 kg; 13 st 8 lb)
- Position: Centre
- Shot: Left
- Played for: Minnesota North Stars
- NHL draft: 75th overall, 1986; Minnesota North Stars
- Playing career: 1988–1996

Kirk H. Tomlinson (born May 2, 1968) is a Canadian former professional ice hockey centre who played in one National Hockey League game for the Minnesota North Stars during the 1987–88 NHL season.

As a youth, he played in the 1981 Quebec International Pee-Wee Hockey Tournament with the Toronto Young Nationals minor ice hockey team.

He is also a former head coach in the West Coast Hockey League, United Hockey League, and Central Hockey League.

== Career statistics ==
			Regular season					Playoffs
Season	Team	League	GP	G	A	Pts	PIM	GP	G	A	Pts	PIM
1984–85	New Westminster Bruins	WHL	66	9	14	23	48	11	1	3	4	20
1985–86	Hamilton Steelhawks	OHL	58	28	23	51	230	—	—	—	—	—
1986–87	Hamilton Steelhawks	OHL	65	33	37	70	169	9	4	6	10	28
1987–88	Hamilton Steelhawks	OHL	23	10	18	28	72	—	—	—	—	—
1987–88	Oshawa Generals	OHL	26	10	13	23	138	6	4	4	8	16
1987–88	Minnesota North Stars	NHL	1	0	0	0	0	—	—	—	—	—
1988–89	Kitchener Rangers	OHL	43	29	30	59	131	5	2	4	6	2
1988–89	Kalamazoo Wings	IHL	3	0	0	0	12	—	—	—	—	—
1990–91	Nashville Knights	ECHL	57	36	37	73	385	—	—	—	—	—
1990–91	Adirondack Red Wings	AHL	8	0	2	2	62	2	0	0	0	5
1991–92	Adirondack Red Wings	AHL	54	3	12	15	356	8	1	0	1	17
1992–93	Adirondack Red Wings	AHL	50	8	12	20	224	9	0	1	1	32
1993–94	Las Vegas Thunder	IHL	15	2	6	8	95	—	—	—	—	—
1994–95	Fort Wayne Komets	IHL	13	0	1	1	82	—	—	—	—	—
1994–95	Peoria Rivermen	IHL	41	11	9	20	171	9	0	1	1	17
1995–96	Peoria Rivermen	IHL	24	3	6	9	59	—	—	—	—	—
NHL totals			1	0	0	0	0	—	—	—	—	—
AHL totals			112	11	26	37	642	19	1	1	2	54
IHL totals			96	16	22	38	419	9	0	1	1	17

== See also ==
- List of players who played only one game in the NHL
