= EHC Kloten =

- City: Kloten, Switzerland
- League: National League: NL 1962–2018 2022–present; SL 1947–1962 2018–2022; Serie A 1946–1947; Serie B 1941-1946
- Founded: 1934
- Home arena: SWISS Arena
- Colors
- General manager: Larry Mitchell
- Head coach: Gerry Fleming
- Captain: Steve Kellenberger
- Affiliates: HC Thurgau
- Website: www.ehc-kloten.ch

Franchise history
- 1934–2000 2016–present: EHC Kloten
- 2000–2016: Kloten Flyers

EHC Kloten is a professional ice hockey team based in Kloten in Switzerland. The team competes in the National League (NL), the highest league in Switzerland. It has one of the best youth systems in Swiss ice hockey as its youth teams have won 19 championships during the last 50 years. EHC Kloten won four consecutive Swiss championships from 1993 to 1996. They had never been relegated until the 2017–18 season. They returned to the NL following the 2021–22 season.

The team was called the Kloten Flyers between 2000 and 2016.

== History ==
EHC Kloten was founded by a group of seven members, led by Emil Hegner, on December 3, 1934. During the first few years, only exhibition matches were played. The home matches were played on the frozen Nägelimoos-Weiher.

When EHC Kloten began to participate in the championship, they had to start in the lowest league, as usual. In 1941, they were promoted into the Serie B and five years later into the Serie A. One year later, in 1947, the EHC Kloten was promoted into the Swiss League. In 1962, they joined the National League when the league expanded to 10 teams.

In 1967, they became the champions for the first time, headed by their Czech coach Vladimir Kobera.

For the 1998-99 season the former Russian ice hockey player Vladimir Yurzinov was asked to become the new coach. He introduced a new playing style and encouraged the development and promotion of young players. Even though many people liked this philosophy, the team remained unsuccessful. During the 2003-2004 season, the team reached the playoffs for the first time in their history. A year later, in the 2004-2005 playoffs, they again managed to remain in the highest league. However, this strategy is paying off today.

In October 2004, Yurzinov was released as their coach. He took on a new role as a youth promoter until the end of the season. Yurzinov's successor was former EHC Kloten defenseman Anders Eldebrink and assistant Felix Hollenstein. The new coaching duo managed to get the team back to success and are still in charge of the team.

During the 2008-2009 season, the Flyers swept both HC Geneve-Servette and EV Zug in the playoffs before losing the playoff final against HC Davos in seven games. They finished the regular season in 3rd place.

The club has a well known junior program. There’s a partnership between the Kloten Flyers and the teams of Bülach, Dielsdorf-Niederhasli and Winterthur. Since the founding of the elite-junior league, the teams have won 19 titles, the latest being in the 2005-06 season.

The team's name was reverted from Kloten Flyers to EHC Kloten for the 2016–17 NLA season after the club had been taken over by businessman Hans-Ulrich Lehmann, who bought the organization from the owner group Avenir Sports Entertainment. Pekka Tirkkonen from Finland was appointed new head coach for the 2016–17 season after Sean Simpson had parted company with the club. The team had one of the worst attendances of the NL for the 2016–17 season, averaging only 5,229 spectators over their 25 regular season home games. It was also the only team which failed to sell out at least one game during the regular season.

On February 1, 2017, the team won the first Swiss Cup in club history, against Geneve-Servette HC, in a packed Swiss Arena.

The team won the Swiss League title in April 2022 against EHC Olten to gain automatic promotion to the NL.

== Honors ==
=== Champions ===
- NL Championship (5): 1967, 1993, 1994, 1995, 1996
- Swiss Cup (1): 2017
- Swiss League (1): 2022

=== Runners-up ===
- NL Championship (6): 1972, 1987, 1988, 2009, 2011, 2014

== Players ==
=== Current roster ===
Updated 30 October 2026.

No.	Nat	Player	Pos	S/G	Age	Acquired	Birthplace
46	(Sweden)	Pontus Åberg	W	R	33	2026	Stockholm, Sweden
50	(Switzerland)	Reto Berra	G	L	39	2026	Bülach, Switzerland
9	(Switzerland)	Noah Delémont	D	L	24	2025	Biel/Bienne, Switzerland
11	(Switzerland)	Keanu Derungs	LW	L	24	2022	Ilanz, Switzerland
29	(Italy)	Davide Fadani	G	L	25	2025	Milan, Italy
10	(Canada)	Brandon Gignac	F	L	28	2025	Repentigny, Quebec, Canada
77	(Switzerland)	Leandro Hausheer	D	R	23	2025	Zürich, Switzerland
13	(Switzerland)	Joel Henry	C	L	23	2026	Münsterlingen, Switzerland
61	(Switzerland)	Michael Hügli	W	R	30	2026	Seedorf, Switzerland
23	(Sweden)	Simon Johansson	D	R	27	2026	Stockholm, Sweden
53	(Switzerland)	Cyril Keller	C	L	20	2024	Bülach, Switzerland
89	(Switzerland)	Kimi Körbler	RW	L	20	2025	Chur, Switzerland
55	(Sweden)	Max Lindroth (A)	D	L	30	2025	Sävedalen, Sweden
47	(Finland)	Joona Luoto	W	L	29	2026	Tampere, Finland
92	(Switzerland)	Rafael Meier	LW	L	21	2021	Bülach, Switzerland
71	(Switzerland)	Simon Meier	C	L	21	2025	Bülach, Switzerland
88	(Switzerland)	Dario Meyer (C)	RW	L	29	2021	Bern, Switzerland
81	(Switzerland)	Raphael Prassl	F	L	28	2026	Zürich, Switzerland
41	(Switzerland)	Leandro Profico	D	L	36	2023	Chur, Switzerland
90	(Finland)	Petteri Puhakka	LW	L	25	2025	Pyhäjoki, Finland
14	(Switzerland)	Mischa Ramel (A)	C	L	23	2021	Olten, Switzerland
25	(Finland)	Arttu Ruotsalainen (A)	C	L	29	2026	Oulu, Finland
91	(Switzerland)	Reto Schäppi (A)	RW	L	35	2024	Horgen, Switzerland
5	(Switzerland)	Dominik Schlumpf	D	R	35	2026	Mönchaltorf, Switzerland
18	(Switzerland)	Dario Sidler	D	R	23	2024	Geneva, Switzerland
31	(Switzerland)	Santo Simmchen	G	L	21	2026	Dresden, Germany
95	(Switzerland)	Nicholas Steiner	D	L	35	2018	Eggiwil, Switzerland
72	(Switzerland)	Keijo Weibel	LW	L	25	2024	Bern, Switzerland
16	(Austria)	Bernd Wolf (A)	D	L	29	2024	Vienna, Austria

=== Honored members ===
EHC Kloten retired numbers
No.	Player	Position	Career	No. retirement
4	Marco Klöti	D	1992–2007	–
7	Peter Schlagenhauf	RW	1969–1994	–
20	Reto Pavoni	G	1986–2002	–
21	Roman Wäger	LW	1980–1999	–
22	Victor Stancescu	LW	2001–2016	–
24	Felix Hollenstein	RW	1985–2002	–
26	Mikael Johansson	C	1992–1997	–
32	Anders Eldebrink	D	1990–1995	–

=== NHL alumni ===
- Dmitri Afanasenkov
- Bruce Affleck
- Jonas Andersson
- Peter Andersson
- Mark Bell
- Patrice Brisebois
- Aris Brimanis
- Severin Blindenbacher
- Rod Brind'Amour
- Curtis Brown
- Greg Brown
- Brandon Convery
- Tony Currie
- Don Dietrich
- Micki DuPont
- Murray Eaves
- Anders Eldebrink
- Brian Felsner
- Martin Gerber
- Alexandre Giroux
- Erik Gustafsson
- Kari Haakana
- Jeff Halpern
- Radek Hamr
- Timo Helbling
- Chris Herperger
- Bob Hess
- Glenn Hicks
- Jaroslav Hlinka
- Peter Ihnacak
- Calle Johansson
- Bernie Johnston
- Olli Jokinen
- Marko Kiprusoff
- Chad Kolarik
- Chris Kontos
- Kamil Kreps
- Scott Lachance
- Brooks Laich
- Gary Lupul
- Rick MacLeish
- Kris Manery
- Bill McDougall
- Bob Mongrain
- Peter Mueller
- Brady Murray
- Kent Nilsson
- Niklas Nordgren
- Mark Olver
- Chris O'Sullivan
- Lasse Pirjetä
- Domenico Pittis
- Vojtech Polak
- Jame Pollock
- Paul Ranger
- Shawn Rivers
- Deron Quint
- Tommi Santala
- James Sheppard
- Gordon Sherven
- Tommy Sjödin
- Tobias Stephan
- David Tanabe
- Chris Tancill
- Claude Verret
- Roman Wick
- Brian Willsie
- Ron Wilson
- Ross Yates

=== Notable coaches ===
- Vladimir Kobera, champion 1967
- Conny Evensson, champion 1993, 1994
- Alpo Suhonen, champion 1995, 1996
