= Sean Williams (ice hockey) =

Canadian ice hockey player (born 1968)

- Born: January 28, 1968 (age 58) Oshawa, Ontario, Canada
- Height: 6 ft 1 in (185 cm)
- Weight: 182 lb (83 kg; 13 st 0 lb)
- Position: Centre
- Shot: Left
- Played for: Chicago Blackhawks; HC Gherdëina
- NHL draft: 245th overall, 1986; Chicago Blackhawks
- Playing career: 1988–1996

Sean B. Williams (born January 28, 1968) is a Canadian retired professional ice hockey centre. Williams was born in Oshawa, Ontario. As a youth, he played in the 1981 Quebec International Pee-Wee Hockey Tournament with a minor ice hockey team from Oshawa. He played two games in the National Hockey League with the Chicago Blackhawks during the 1991–92 season. Williams was a twelfth round draft pick of the Blackhawks in the 1986 NHL entry draft. He spent the majority of his career, which lasted from 1988 to 196, with the Indianapolis Ice of the International Hockey League.

== Career statistics ==
=== Regular season and playoffs ===
			Regular season					Playoffs
Season	Team	League	GP	G	A	Pts	PIM	GP	G	A	Pts	PIM
1983–84	Oshawa Legionaires	MetJBHL	42	15	28	43	34	—	—	—	—	—
1984–85	Oshawa Generals	OHL	40	6	7	13	28	5	1	0	1	0
1985–86	Oshawa Generals	OHL	55	15	23	38	23	6	2	3	5	4
1986–87	Oshawa Generals	OHL	62	21	23	44	32	25	7	5	12	19
1986–7	Oshawa Generals	M-Cup	—	—	—	—	—	4	1	1	2	5
1987–88	Oshawa Generals	OHL	65	58	65	123	38	7	3	3	6	6
1988–89	Saginaw Hawks	IHL	77	32	27	59	75	6	0	3	3	0
1989–90	Indianapolis Ice	IHL	78	21	37	58	25	14	8	5	13	12
1990–91	Indianapolis Ice	IHL	82	46	52	98	59	7	1	2	3	12
1991–92	Chicago Black Hawks	NHL	2	0	0	0	4	—	—	—	—	—
1991–92	Indianapolis Ice	IHL	79	29	36	65	89	—	—	—	—	—
1992–93	Indianapolis Ice	IHL	81	28	37	65	66	5	0	1	1	4
1993–94	HC Gherdëina	ITA	22	20	23	43	4	—	—	—	—	—
1993–94	HC Gherdëina	ALP	28	14	15	29	21	—	—	—	—	—
1994–95	Minnesota Moose	IHL	81	20	26	46	34	3	1	0	1	0
1995–96	Minnesota Moose	IHL	78	14	14	28	94	—	—	—	—	—
IHL totals			556	190	229	419	442	35	10	11	21	28
NHL totals			2	0	0	0	4	—	—	—	—	—
