= Kansas City Outlaws =

Former professional ice hockey team

- City: Kansas City, Missouri
- League: United Hockey League
- Founded: 2004
- Home arena: Kemper Arena
- Colors: Red, gold, white
- Owner: Stephen Franke
- Head coach: Darryl Williams

Franchise history
- 2004–2005: Kansas City Outlaws

The Kansas City Outlaws were a minor professional ice hockey team that played in the United Hockey League (UHL) for the 2004–05 season. They played their home games at Kemper Arena in Kansas City, Missouri.

== Overview ==
The Kansas City metropolitan area had a long history of being home to professional hockey teams prior to the Outlaws. From 1927 to 1942, the area had an organization in the American Hockey Association (AHA) known at various times as the Kansas City Pla-Mors, Greyhounds, and Americans. After WWII, the organization returned in the AHA's successor, the United States Hockey League (USHL), as the Kansas City Pla-Mors, Kansas City Mohawks, and Royals from 1945 to 1951. In 1967, the Kansas City Blues joined the Central Hockey League (CHL) from 1967 to 1972, but ceased operations when the Kansas City Scouts of the National Hockey League was awarded as an expansion team in the newly built Kemper Arena. The Scouts played from 1974 to 1976, but relocated and the Blues returned and played for one more season in the CHL before being renamed as the Kansas City Red Wings until 1979. Professional hockey did not return until 1990 when the Kansas City Blades were added in the International Hockey League (IHL) until 2001 when the league folded.

In July 2004, the United Hockey League (UHL) awarded a Kansas City franchise to Stephen Franke, co-owner of the UHL's Fort Wayne Komets, for the upcoming 2004–05 season. The Outlaws were coached by Darryl Williams. Joe Bucchino, formerly of the Boston Bruin and New York Ranger organizations, served as General Manager. Richard Adler was the team president, responsible for day-to-day business operations.

Rob Schweyer was named the team's first captain, but when he left the team following an injury, player/assistant coach Jason Ruff received the captain designation. Ruff went on to lead the Outlaws in scoring. The Outlaws began their lone season by winning back-to-back home games against cross-state rival Missouri River Otters on October 15 and October 16, 2004, and earning a 5–1 record in the first two weeks. From then on, the team finished last in the Western Division with a record of 28–45–7 (wins, losses and overtime losses).

Star players for the Outlaws included Ruff, goaltender Maxime Gingras, winger Joe Seroski, defenseman Matthieu Descoteaux, winger Jimmy Callahan and center Mark Lee. Lee started his professional tenure with the Outlaws, which jump started his career in the American Hockey League and the ECHL.

The team struggled to attract fans as the reported attendance was "around 2,800" per game according to team officials. The team played their final game, an 8–1 win over the Komets on April 10, 2005. Following the finale, it was reported three days later that a local printing company, Superior Color Graphics LLC, had filed a lawsuit for non-payment against the team. The lawsuit was reported to be in totaling $45,777.56. The lawsuit was eventually dismissed. Around this time rumors began to circulate the team would move to Toledo, Ohio, the following season. On April 15, 2005, the team suspended operations and officially folded, leaving Kansas City without a professional hockey team once again.

Since the Outlaws' folding, NHL exhibition games have continued to be been held in the city at the Sprint Center, which opened in downtown Kansas City in 2007 with the goal of landing an NHL or NBA team. While NHL teams have threatened to move to Kansas City, none have done so. In 2009, the Kansas City area got another minor professional team in the Missouri Mavericks of the new Central Hockey League in nearby Independence, Missouri, at the Independence Events Center.

== Notable former players ==
- Travis Banga
- Darren Banks
- François Caron
- Matthieu Descoteaux
- Maxime Gingras
- Gerry Hickey
- Derek Kern
- Mark Lee
- Jason Ruff
