= FCV =

FCV may refer to:

== Football clubs ==
- FC Vaajakoski, Finland
- FC Vaduz, Liechtenstein
- FC Vestsjælland, Denmark
- FC Vilshofen, Germany

== Other uses ==
- Feline calicivirus, a disease affecting cats
- Female copulatory vocalization
- Flow control valve
- Ford Crown Victoria
- Forest City Velodrome, in Waterloo, Ontario, Canada
- Forests Commission Victoria, Australia
- Fuel cell vehicle
  - Mitsubishi FCV
  - Toyota FCV
