= Mark Lee (ice hockey) =

Canadian ice hockey player

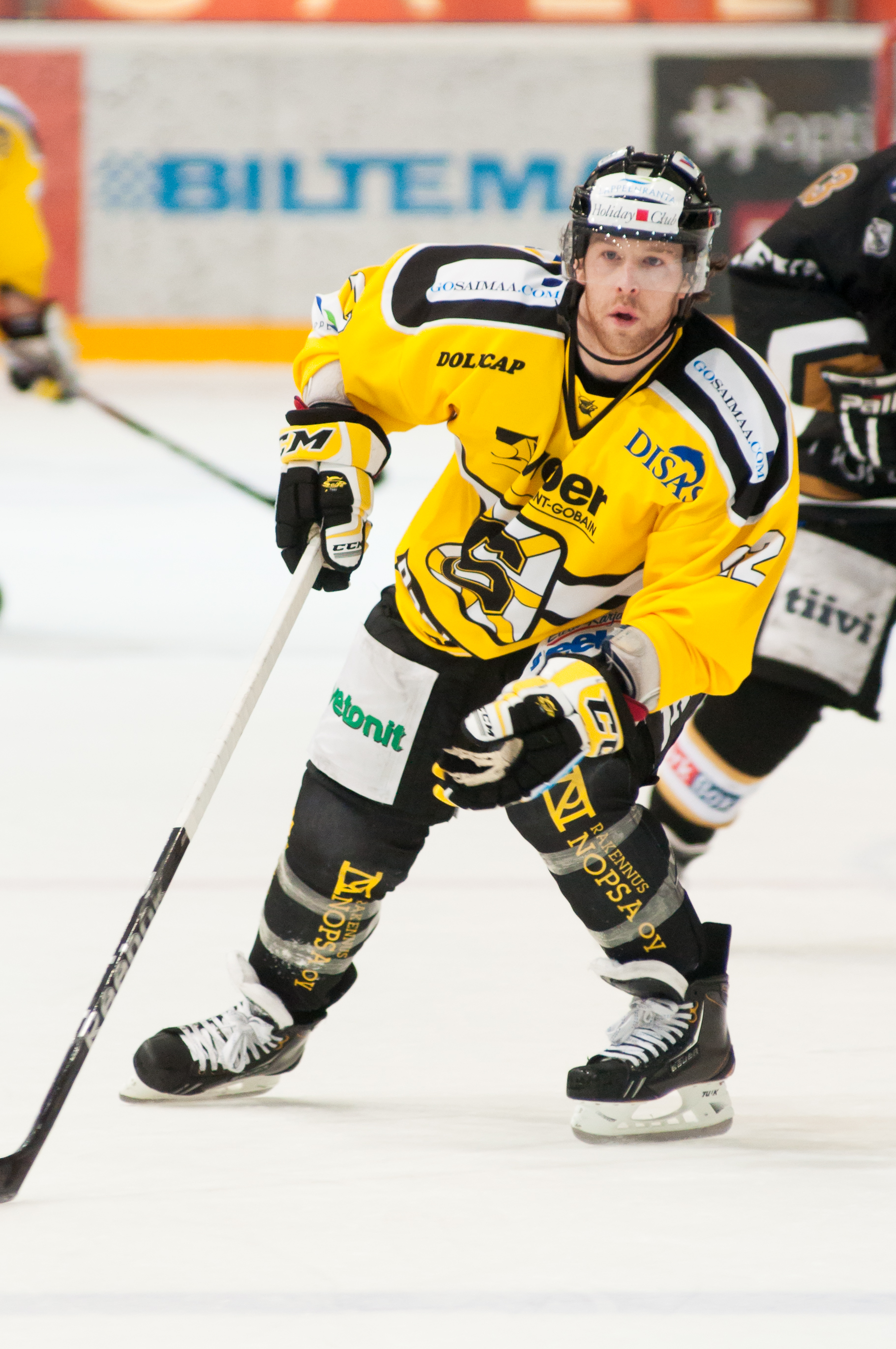
- Lee with SaiPa in 2012
- Born: September 11, 1984 (age 41) Mount Pearl, Newfoundland, Canada
- Height: 5 ft 11 in (180 cm)
- Weight: 184 lb (83 kg; 13 st 2 lb)
- Position: Centre
- Shot: Left
- DEL team: Schwenninger Wild Wings
- Played for: Kansas City Outlaws; Bridgeport Sound Tigers; Trenton Titans; Hartford Wolf Pack; Charlotte Checkers; Florida Everblades; Esbjerg IK; Ilves; Ässät; SaiPa; Espoo Blues; San Francisco Bulls
- NHL draft: Undrafted
- Playing career: 2004–2019

Mark Lee (born September 11, 1984) is a Canadian former professional ice hockey centre.
