= Felix Hollenstein =

Swiss ice hockey player

- Born: April 7, 1965 (age 60); Bülach, Switzerland
- Height: 6 ft 0 in (183 cm)
- Weight: 201 lb (91 kg; 14 st 5 lb)
- Position: Right wing
- Shot: Left
- Played for: EHC Bülach; EHC Kloten
- National team: Switzerland
- Playing career: 1985–2002

Felix Hollenstein (born April 7, 1965) is a former Swiss ice hockey player, who became four times Swiss champion with the EHC Kloten in the Nationalliga A. In his career, Hollenstein played 650 matches in the NLA and 131 for Switzerland men's national ice hockey team, where he scored 47 goals.

== Playing career ==
Felix Hollenstein began his career in the EHC Bülach, for which he played until 1985. He was then transferred to the EHC Kloten, where he stayed for the rest of his active career. Between 1993 and 1996 he won four titles with his team. In 1996 he became the best scoring Swiss during the playoffs. During his career, he also twice became the best Swiss scorer in the regular season.

In his last season, 2001/2002, he could only participate in one game during the regular season due to an injury of his knee. In the playoffs, he returned for one game. As the score was 0:6, in the sixth semi final match in the series between Kloten and the HC Davos it was decided that he should play the last part of the game. So he came down from the stands and got dressed. The HC Davos agreed, that he could participate in the game, even though he wasn't noted on the game sheet. Kloten still lost the game and was kicked out of the playoffs. Felix Hollenstein then ended his career.

== Coaching career ==
He then worked as a coach for the Kloten junior team, before he became the assistant coach of the Flyers' NLA squad in 2004. He remained in that job until the end of the 2011-12 season. In February 2013, he came back to Kloten and was hired as head coach after the sacking of Tomas Tamfal. Hollenstein was relieved of his duties in December 2014. In December 2015, he was named assistant coach of the Swiss national team. On July 1, 2016, Hollenstein was relieved of his duties of assistant coach.

=== International ===
Felix Hollenstein was part of the core of the national team of Switzerland between 1988 and 1997. He participated in seven Ice Hockey World Championships, the 1988 Winter Olympics, as well as the qualification for the 1998 Winter Olympics in 1997. He played 131 games in which he scored 47 goals.

== Achievements and awards ==
- 1988 Best Swiss scorer of the Nationalliga A
- 1988 All-Star-Team of the Nationalliga A
- 1989 Bester Swiss scorer of the Nationalliga A
- 1989 All-Star-Team of the Nationalliga A
- 1993 Swiss champion with the EHC Kloten
- 1993 All-Star-Team of the NLA-Playoffs
- 1994 Swiss champion with the EHC Kloten
- 1995 Swiss champion with the EHC Kloten
- 1996 Swiss champion with the EHC Kloten
- 1996 Play-off-Topscorer of the Nationalliga A

=== International ===
- 1990 promotion into the A-worldchampionship in Lyon
- 1994 promotion into the A-worldchampionship in Copenhagen
- 1994 All-Star-Team of the B-worldchampionship

== Records ==
- Best Swiss scorer in the playoffs of all time

== NLA-Statistik ==
Source: kloten-flyers-fan.ch, Statistics Felix "Fige" Hollenstein

| | Seasons | Games | Goals | PP-Goals | SH-Tore | Assists | Points | Points per game | penalty minutes |
|---|---|---|---|---|---|---|---|---|---|
| Regular season | 17 | 525 | 224 | 41 | 14 | 313 | 537 | 1,02 | 617 |
| Playoffs | 17 | 125 | 58 | 11 | 2 | 62 | 120 | 0,96 | 176 |
