= Mike Millar =

Canadian ice hockey player

- Born: April 28, 1965 (age 61) St. Catharines, Ontario, Canada
- Height: 5 ft 10 in (178 cm)
- Weight: 170 lb (77 kg; 12 st 2 lb)
- Position: Right wing
- Shot: Left
- Played for: Hartford Whalers; Washington Capitals; Boston Bruins; Toronto Maple Leafs; ESV Kaufbeuren; EHC Chur; Kassel Huskies; Frankfurt Lions
- NHL draft: 110th overall, 1984; Hartford Whalers
- Playing career: 1986–2003

Michael Millar (born April 28, 1965) is a Canadian retired professional ice hockey player. Millar was selected 110th overall by the Hartford Whalers in the 1984 NHL entry draft. As well as the Whalers, he also played for the Washington Capitals, Boston Bruins, and Toronto Maple Leafs. Millar was born in St. Catharines, Ontario.

Millar played 10 seasons in the Deutsche Eishockey Liga and one in National League A between 1991 and 2002.

== Career statistics ==
| | | | Regular season | | | | | Playoffs |
| Season | Team | League | GP | G | A | Pts | PIM | GP | G | A | Pts | PIM |
|---|---|---|---|---|---|---|---|---|---|---|---|---|
| 1982–83 | Brantford Alexanders | OHL | 53 | 20 | 29 | 49 | 10 | 8 | 0 | 5 | 5 | 2 |
| 1983–84 | Brantford Alexanders | OHL | 69 | 50 | 45 | 95 | 48 | 6 | 4 | 0 | 4 | 2 |
| 1984–85 | Hamilton Steelhawks | OHL | 63 | 66 | 60 | 126 | 54 | 17 | 9 | 10 | 19 | 14 |
| 1986–87 | Hartford Whalers | NHL | 10 | 2 | 2 | 4 | 0 | — | — | — | — | — |
| 1986–87 | Binghamton Whalers | AHL | 61 | 45 | 32 | 77 | 38 | 13 | 7 | 4 | 11 | 27 |
| 1987–88 | Hartford Whalers | NHL | 28 | 7 | 7 | 14 | 6 | — | — | — | — | — |
| 1987–88 | Binghamton Whalers | AHL | 31 | 32 | 17 | 49 | 42 | — | — | — | — | — |
| 1988–89 | Washington Capitals | NHL | 18 | 6 | 3 | 9 | 4 | — | — | — | — | — |
| 1988–89 | Baltimore Skipjacks | AHL | 53 | 47 | 35 | 82 | 58 | — | — | — | — | — |
| 1989–90 | Boston Bruins | NHL | 15 | 1 | 4 | 5 | 0 | — | — | — | — | — |
| 1989–90 | Maine Mariners | AHL | 60 | 40 | 33 | 73 | 77 | — | — | — | — | — |
| 1990–91 | Toronto Maple Leafs | NHL | 7 | 2 | 2 | 4 | 2 | — | — | — | — | — |
| 1990–91 | Newmarket Saints | AHL | 62 | 33 | 29 | 62 | 63 | — | — | — | — | — |
| 1991–92 | ESV Kaufbeuren | Germany | 42 | 34 | 21 | 55 | 86 | — | — | — | — | — |
| 1992–93 | EHC Chur | NLA | 35 | 31 | 21 | 52 | 75 | — | — | — | — | — |
| 1993–94 | EC Kassel | Germany2 | 62 | 66 | 44 | 110 | 170 | — | — | — | — | — |
| 1994–95 | Kassel Huskies | DEL | 43 | 39 | 21 | 60 | 76 | 9 | 6 | 5 | 11 | 24 |
| 1995–96 | Kassel Huskies | DEL | 50 | 31 | 23 | 54 | 96 | 8 | 3 | 5 | 8 | 8 |
| 1996–97 | Kassel Huskies | DEL | 42 | 23 | 35 | 58 | 48 | 10 | 2 | 1 | 3 | 6 |
| 1997–98 | Kassel Huskies | DEL | 6 | 1 | 3 | 4 | 6 | — | — | — | — | — |
| 1997–98 | Frankfurt Lions | DEL | 41 | 14 | 26 | 40 | 20 | 7 | 2 | 3 | 5 | 2 |
| 1998–99 | GEC Nordhorn | Germany2 | 53 | 45 | 51 | 96 | 120 | — | — | — | — | — |
| 1999–00 | Hamburg Crocodiles | Germany2 | 29 | 22 | 14 | 36 | 64 | — | — | — | — | — |
| 2000–01 | Hamburg Crocodiles | Germany3 | 36 | 25 | 28 | 53 | 115 | — | — | — | — | — |
| 2001–02 | Dundas Real McCoys | OHA-Sr. | 11 | 24 | 13 | 37 | 8 | — | — | — | — | — |
| 2001–02 | REV Bremerhaven | Germany2 | 6 | 3 | 2 | 5 | 6 | — | — | — | — | — |
| 2002–03 | Dundas Real McCoys | MLH | 3 | 4 | 3 | 7 | 2 | — | — | — | — | — |
| NHL totals | | | 78 | 18 | 18 | 36 | 12 | — | — | — | — | — |
| AHL totals | | | 267 | 197 | 146 | 343 | 278 | 13 | 7 | 4 | 11 | 27 |
| DEL totals | | | 182 | 108 | 108 | 216 | 246 | 34 | 13 | 14 | 27 | 40 |
