= Andrew Cassels =

Canadian ice hockey player (born 1969)

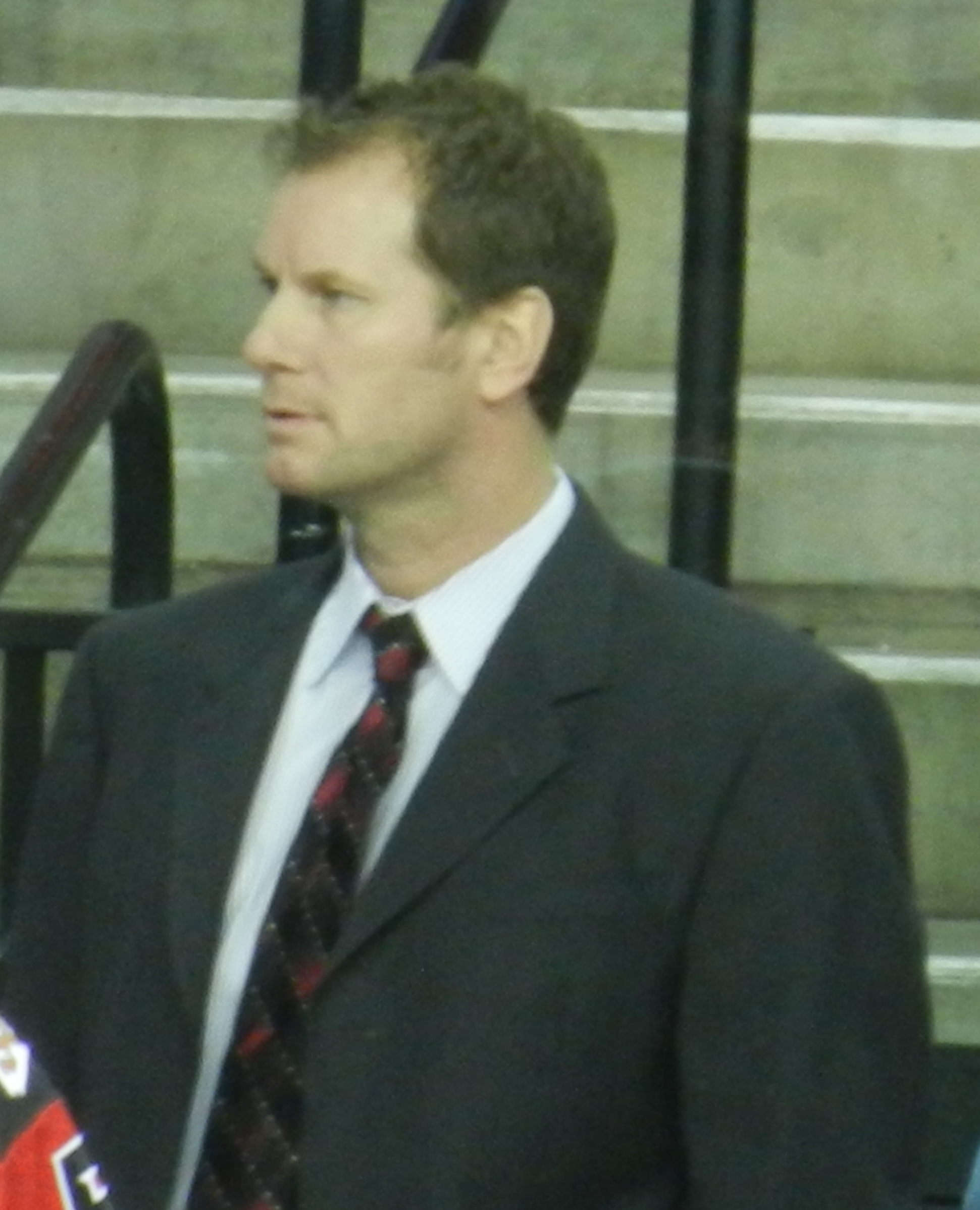
- Cassels in 2011
- Born: July 23, 1969 (age 57) Bramalea, Ontario, Canada
- Height: 6 ft 1 in (185 cm)
- Weight: 185 lb (84 kg; 13 st 3 lb)
- Position: Centre
- Shot: Left
- Played for: Montreal Canadiens; Hartford Whalers; Calgary Flames; Vancouver Canucks; Columbus Blue Jackets; Washington Capitals
- National team: Canada
- NHL draft: 17th overall, 1987; Montreal Canadiens
- Playing career: 1989–2006

Andrew William Cassels (born July 23, 1969) is a Canadian former professional ice hockey centre who played sixteen seasons in the National Hockey League (NHL) for the Montreal Canadiens, Hartford Whalers, Calgary Flames, Vancouver Canucks, Columbus Blue Jackets and Washington Capitals. He is a former assistant coach with the Cincinnati Cyclones of the ECHL. Cassels was born and raised in Bramalea, Ontario, where he played his minor hockey. His son, Cole, was drafted 85th overall by the Vancouver Canucks in the 2013 NHL entry draft.

== Playing career ==
As a youth, he played in the 1982 Quebec International Pee-Wee Hockey Tournament with a minor ice hockey team from Chinguacousy in Brampton, Ontario.

Andrew Cassels was selected 17th overall by the Montreal Canadiens in the 1987 NHL entry draft. He played three stellar seasons with the Ottawa 67's of the OHL, with his best season coming in 1987–88, when he led the OHL in assists and points in both the regular season and playoffs en route to winning the league MVP award. In his NHL debut with Montreal on 19 November 1989, Cassels scored his first career goal on his first shift and first shot against the Calgary Flames. However, Cassels found his playing time limited on a deep Montreal team, and played only 60 games for the Canadiens before being traded to the Hartford Whalers in 1991 for a second-round draft pick that the Canadiens used to pick Valeri Bure.

It was in Hartford that Cassels had his greatest success. He recorded 41 points in the 1991–92 campaign and had a strong playoffs, finally showing the offensive potential that had seen him taken in the first round of the draft. He would explode in 1992–93, as he recorded 21 goals and 64 assists for 85 points, and formed a deadly partnership with sniper Geoff Sanderson establishing himself as one of the best young playmaking centres in the game. While he would not come close to matching those totals again as Hartford struggled to non-playoff finishes, he continued to mature as an all-around player in the following years. He and Sanderson remained a consistent and effective offensive partnership. Cassels led the Whalers in assists for 5 consecutive seasons from 1992 to 1997, and led the team in overall scoring in the lockout-shortened 1994–95 season.

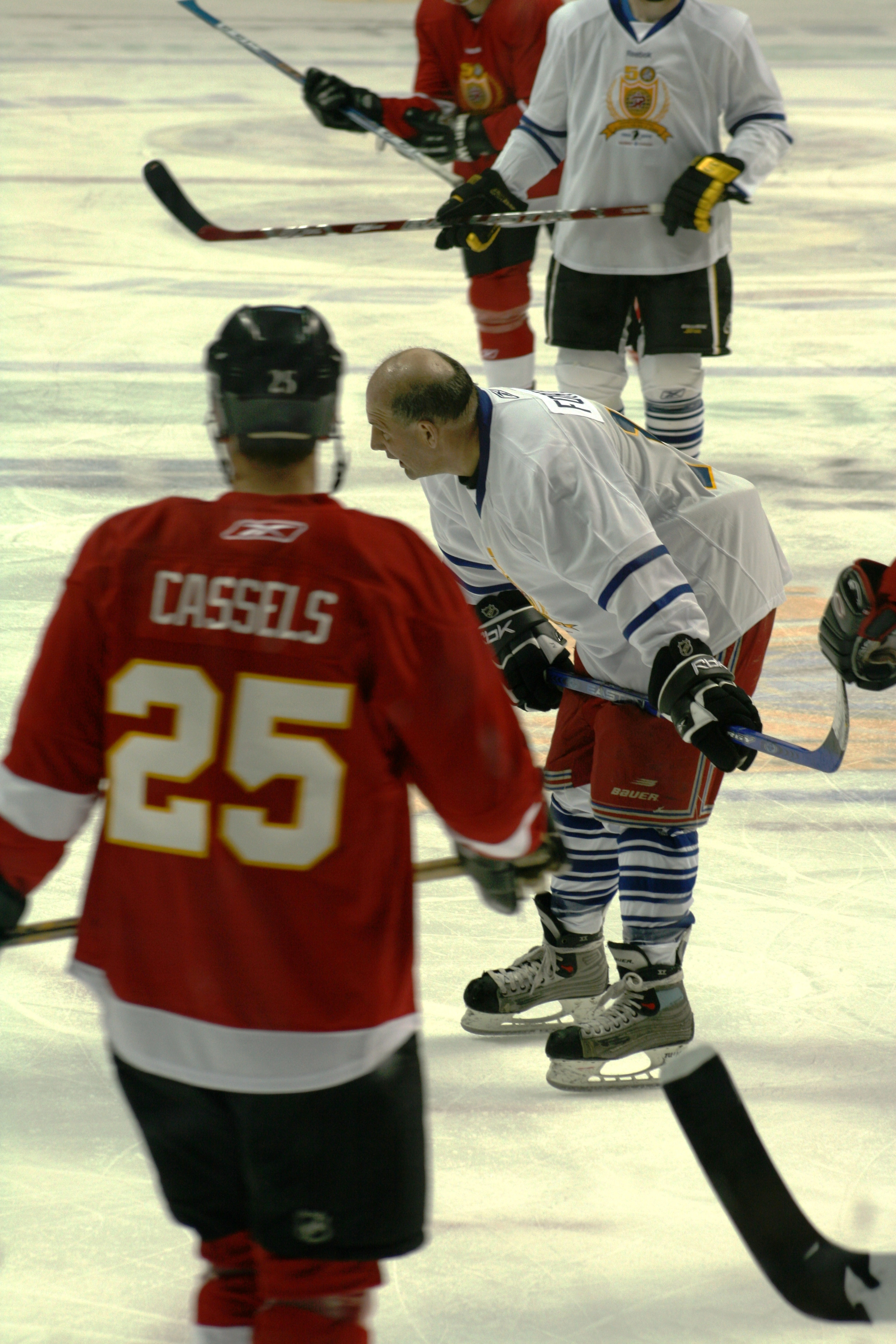
Cassels playing at the Legends Games for the 50th edition of the Quebec International Pee-Wee Hockey Tournament

Cassels was a member of the final Whalers team in 1996–97, but did not make the move with the franchise to Carolina as he was dealt to the Calgary Flames that summer. He would play two seasons for the Flames but struggled to produce in the defensive system of coach Brian Sutter, slumping to totals of just 44 and 37 points.

In 1999, Cassels became an unrestricted free agent and signed a three-year contract with the Vancouver Canucks. In Vancouver, he would be rejuvenated offensively, bouncing back to a record 45 assists and 62 points in 1999–2000. In his first two seasons in Vancouver, he would lead the team in assists and finish second in scoring. However, team success continued to elude him, as his string of playoff misses was extended to nine. In the 2001–02, Cassels would play some of the best hockey of his career, recording 50 points in 53 games and helping the Canucks reach the playoffs - their second appearance since 1996 and his first since 1992.

With the expiration of his contract in 2002 and the development of younger centremen Brendan Morrison and Henrik Sedin, Cassels left Vancouver in 2002 to sign a free agent contract with the Columbus Blue Jackets, where he was reunited with his friend and former linemate Geoff Sanderson. None of their chemistry had disappeared in their five years apart, as both players had their biggest years since their time in Hartford. Cassels' 48 assists and 68 points were his highest totals since his career year in 1993. However, injuries would take their toll in the 2003–04 NHL season as he slumped to just six goals and 26 points, his lowest totals since his rookie year in Montreal.

Following the 2004–05 NHL lockout, Cassels signed with the Washington Capitals on 12 August 2005. However, the year-long layoff, along with age and injuries, greatly reduced his effectiveness. After playing just 31 games and scoring only 12 points, Cassels was released by the Capitals on 28 January 2006.

In 16 NHL seasons, Cassels appeared in 1015 games, recording 204 goals and 528 assists for 732 points along with 410 penalty minutes. He led his team in assists in seven of those seasons.

== Awards ==
- 1986–87 - OHL Emms Family Award (Rookie of the Year)
- 1987–88 - OHL First All-Star Team
- 1987–88 - OHL William Hanley Trophy (Most Gentlemanly player)
- 1987–88 - OHL Eddie Powers Memorial Trophy (Leading Scorer)
- 1987–88 - OHL Red Tilson Trophy (MVP)
- 1988–89 - OHL First All-Star Team

== Career statistics ==
=== Regular season and playoffs ===
			Regular season					Playoffs
Season	Team	League	GP	G	A	Pts	PIM	GP	G	A	Pts	PIM
1984–85	Bramalea Blues	MetJHL	4	2	0	2	0	—	—	—	—	—
1985–86	Bramalea Blues	MetJHL	33	18	25	43	26	—	—	—	—	—
1986–87	Ottawa 67's	OHL	66	26	66	92	28	11	5	9	14	7
1987–88	Ottawa 67's	OHL	61	48	103	151	39	16	8	24	32	13
1988–89	Ottawa 67's	OHL	56	37	97	134	66	12	5	10	15	10
1989–90	Montreal Canadiens	NHL	6	2	0	2	2	—	—	—	—	—
1989–90	Sherbrooke Canadiens	AHL	55	22	45	67	25	12	2	11	13	6
1990–91	Montreal Canadiens	NHL	54	6	19	25	20	8	0	2	2	2
1991–92	Hartford Whalers	NHL	67	11	30	41	18	7	2	4	6	6
1992–93	Hartford Whalers	NHL	84	21	64	85	62	—	—	—	—	—
1993–94	Hartford Whalers	NHL	79	16	42	58	37	—	—	—	—	—
1994–95	Hartford Whalers	NHL	46	7	30	37	18	—	—	—	—	—
1995–96	Hartford Whalers	NHL	81	20	43	63	39	—	—	—	—	—
1996–97	Hartford Whalers	NHL	81	22	44	66	46	—	—	—	—	—
1997–98	Calgary Flames	NHL	81	17	27	44	32	—	—	—	—	—
1998–99	Calgary Flames	NHL	70	12	25	37	18	—	—	—	—	—
1999–2000	Vancouver Canucks	NHL	79	17	45	62	16	—	—	—	—	—
2000–01	Vancouver Canucks	NHL	66	12	44	56	10	—	—	—	—	—
2001–02	Vancouver Canucks	NHL	53	11	39	50	22	6	2	1	3	0
2002–03	Columbus Blue Jackets	NHL	79	20	48	68	30	—	—	—	—	—
2003–04	Columbus Blue Jackets	NHL	58	6	20	26	26	—	—	—	—	—
2005–06	Washington Capitals	NHL	31	4	8	12	14	—	—	—	—	—
NHL totals			1,015	204	528	732	410	21	4	7	11	8

=== International ===
Year	Team	Event	GP	G	A	Pts	PIM
1989	Canada	WJC	7	2	5	7	2
1996	Canada	WC	6	1	0	1	0

== See also ==
- List of NHL players with 1,000 games played

Preceded by Mark Pederson	Montreal Canadiens first-round draft pick 1987	Succeeded by Éric Charron
