= Maxime Gingras (ice hockey) =

Canadian ice hockey player

Maxine Gingras
- Born: April 22, 1978 (age 48) Loretteville, Quebec City, Canada
- Height: 5 ft 6 in (168 cm)
- Weight: 160 lb (73 kg; 11 st 6 lb)
- Position: Goaltender
- Played for: Richmond Renegades; Orlando Solar Bears; Providence Bruins; Houston Aeros; Mobile Mysticks; Louisville Panthers; Pensacola Ice Pilots; Richmond RiverDogs; Kansas City Outlaws

Maxime Gingras (born April 22, 1978) is a retired Canadian professional ice hockey goaltender. After eight years spent mostly in the ECHL and UHL, he closed out his career by returning to Quebec to spend four seasons with the Trois-Rivières Caron & Guay of the LNAH.

== Playing career ==
Gingras played for Laval Titan of the QMJHL from the 1995–96 season to the 1997–98 season, going for an overall record of 40–49–5 and playing an additional 16 games in the playoff his final season. In his rookie professional season, 1998–99, Gingras started off with the Richmond Renegades of the ECHL. With the Renegades, he was 30–13–6 through 50 games played and had a 2.26 GAA and a .924 SV% he also played in 18 playoff games. That season he also played in a game for the Orlando Solar Bears of the IHL. In that game, he played 18 minutes allowing three goals and making three saves. In the 1999–00 campaign, Gingras was again a member of the Renegades to start the year, but he played only seven games, going 5–1–1 with a 2.22 GAA and a .920 SV%. He also spent time with the Providence Bruins of the AHL playing in 15 games and posting a 3–9–1 record with a GAA or 3.08 and an SV% of .911. In the same year, he played one game with the Houston Aeros of the IHL. He played 59 minutes, allowing two goals and picking up the loss with a .889 SV%.

Gingras returned to the Renegades for the 2000–01 season. He starred with the team over the season before being traded to the Mobile Mysticks. His stats with Richmond consisted of an 11–5–3 record with a 3.25 GAA and a .892 SV%. With Mobile, he posted a 12–4–1 record while managing a 2.32 GAA and a .921 SV%. He also spent some time in the AHL with the Louisville Panthers where he played in nine games and had a 2–3–0 record posting a 3.55 GAA and a .894 SV%. 2001–02 was his first season with the Pensacola Ice Pilots. He played in 49 games going 24–17–6 with a 3.05 GAA and a .918 SV%. He also played in three playoff games that season. The next season in 2002–03, Gingras went 23–24–9 playing in 57 games and he had a 3.00 GAA with a .913 SV% and playing in 4 playoff games.

In 2003–04, Gingras went to a new league but returned to Richmond to join the Richmond RiverDogs of the UHL. He played 57 games in his only season with the team going 34–15–5 with a GAA of 2.97 and an SV% of .900 and playing in four playoff games. During the offseason, he was traded to the expansion Kansas City Outlaws before the team was even officially announced. As an Outlaw, Gingras went 19–28–5 posting a GAA of 3.18 with a .910 SV%.

In his first season in the LNAH with Trois-Rivières Caron & Guay, Gingras played in 36 games with a 20–10–0 record and a 2.82 GAA with a .920 SV%. In the 2006–07 season, he played in 39 games for a record of 15–17–1, a 4.33 GAA, and a .893 SV%. Gingras spent two more seasons with the Caron et Guay before retiring at the end of the 2009–10 season.

== Awards and accolades ==
- 1998–1999 ECHL Rookie of the Year
- 1998–1999 ECHL Goalie of the Year (first person to win both Rookie and Goalie of the Year)
- Multiple "Player of the Week" and "Goalie of the Week" awards in multiple leagues
- Tied for first in the ECHL for the record of Shutouts in a season with 7 in 1998–99
- Holds the ECHL record for shutouts in one playoff year with 5 in 1999
- Holds the ECHL record for shutouts in one playoff series with 2 in 1999 vs Mississippi
