= Hamilton Steelhawks =

Canadian junior ice hockey team (1984–1988)

- City: Hamilton, Ontario
- League: Ontario Hockey League
- Operated: 1984–1988
- Home arena: Copps Coliseum
- Colours: Red, white and black

Franchise history
- 1946–1953: Windsor Spitfires
- 1953–1960: Hamilton Tiger Cubs
- 1960–1974: Hamilton Red Wings
- 1974–1978: Hamilton/St. Catharines Fincups
- 1978–1984: Brantford Alexanders
- 1984–1988: Hamilton Steelhawks
- 1988–1996: Niagara Falls Thunder
- 1996–present: Erie Otters

The Hamilton Steelhawks were a junior ice hockey team in the Ontario Hockey League from 1984 to 1988. The team was based in Hamilton, Ontario, and played at Copps Coliseum.

== History ==
The Brantford Alexanders were relocated in 1984 becoming the Hamilton Steelhawks. The team chose a name which reflected the steel industry in Hamilton, and wore colours similar to the Chicago Blackhawks. The Steelhawks played home games at Mountain Arena for 1984–85 and then moved to Copps Coliseum in December 1985 as the arena was not ready in time for the start of the season.

On March 9, 1985, the Steelhawks played the Sault Ste. Marie Greyhounds in the televised OHL game of the week, that resulted in a bench-clearing brawl in the second period. A total of 164 minutes in penalties, including 14 fighting majors and 10 game misconducts were called. The Steelhawks were fined $2,000 and coach Bill LaForge was suspended for the balance of the season, including the playoffs.

Keith Gretzky was the co-recipient of the William Hanley Trophy as the league's most sportsmanlike player in the 1986–87 OHL season.

The team played four seasons in Hamilton, then relocated becoming the Niagara Falls Thunder.

== Coaches ==
- 1984–85: Dave Draper (until November 1984), Bill LaForge (November 1984 onward)
- 1985–86: Bill LaForge
- 1986–87: Bill LaForge
- 1987–88: Bill LaForge

== NHL alumni ==
Twenty-five alumni of the Steelhawks later played in the National Hockey League (NHL):

- Roger Belanger
- Shayne Corson
- Troy Crowder
- Brad Dalgarno
- Stan Drulia
- John English
- Mike Hudson
- Jeff Jackson
- Jason Lafreniere
- Paul Laus
- Jamie Leach
- Shawn McCosh
- Ken McRae
- Mike Millar
- Keith Primeau
- Bob Probert
- John Purves
- Chris Pusey
- Mike Rosati
- Jason Simon
- Kirk Tomlinson
- Dennis Vial
- Michael Ware
- Darryl Williams
- Jason York

== Season-by-season results ==
Regular season and playoffs results:

Legend: GP = Games played, W = Wins, L = Losses, T = Ties, Pts = Points, GF = Goals for, GA = Goals against

Memorial Cup champions	OHL champions	OHL finalists

Season	Regular season									Playoffs
Season	GP	W	L	T	Pts	Pct	GF	GA	Finish	Playoffs
1984–85	66	29	35	2	60	0.455	313	296	4th Emms	Won division quarterfinal (North Bay Centennials) 9–7; Won division semifinal (London Knights) 6–2; Lost division final (Sault Ste. Marie Greyhounds) 9–1
1985–86	66	26	36	4	56	0.424	268	306	7th Emms	Did not qualify
1986–87	66	39	24	3	81	0.614	321	258	2nd Emms	Won division quarterfinal (Guelph Platers) 4–1; Lost division semifinal (Windsor Spitfires) 4–0
1987–88	66	35	28	3	73	0.553	327	291	3rd Emms	Won division quarterfinal (North Bay Centennials) 4–0; Won division semifinal (London Knights) 4–2; Lost division final (Windsor Spitfires) 4–0
TOTALS	264	129	123	12	270	0.511	1,229	1,151	—	—
