= Darryl Williams (ice hockey) =

Canadian ice hockey player

- Williams in 2026
- Born: February 29, 1968 (age 58) Labrador City, Newfoundland and Labrador, Canada
- Height: 5 ft 11 in (180 cm)
- Weight: 185 lb (84 kg; 13 st 3 lb)
- Position: Left wing
- Shot: Left
- Played for: Los Angeles Kings
- NHL draft: Undrafted
- Playing career: 1989–1999

Darryl C. Williams (born February 29, 1968) is a Canadian ice hockey coach and former professional player. He was most recently an assistant coach of the Philadelphia Flyers who played extensively in the minor leagues and played two games for the Los Angeles Kings of the National Hockey League (NHL) during the 1992–93 season. He is also formerly an assistant coach for the New York Rangers.

== Coaching career ==
Williams was named assistant coach, Video on August 12, 2008. Williams joined the Canucks from the St. John's Fog Devils of the QMJHL, where he worked the previous four seasons as Associate Coach, Video Coordinator and Strength & Conditioning Coach. With his appointment to the Canucks' staff, Williams became the first Newfoundland native to serve in an NHL coaching position in league history.

Prior to joining St. John's, Williams served in a number of coaching capacities including head coaching duties with the Kansas City Outlaws of the United Hockey League, and assistant coach with the Cincinnati Mighty Ducks of the American Hockey League.

The Labrador City, Newfoundland and Labrador native played 11 seasons in the American Hockey League and International Hockey League, highlighted by a two-game call up to the NHL with the Los Angeles Kings in the 1992-93 season. He is the first ever player from Labrador to play in the NHL.

On July 19, 2021, the Philadelphia Flyers hired Williams as an assistant coach for their NHL team. He remained in that role through the 2024–25 season.

== Career statistics ==
=== Regular season and playoffs ===
			Regular season					Playoffs
Season	Team	League	GP	G	A	Pts	PIM	GP	G	A	Pts	PIM
1985–86	Victoria Cougars	WHL	38	3	2	5	66	—	—	—	—	—
1985–86	Sidney Capitals	BCJHL	15	5	5	10	87	—	—	—	—	—
1986–87	Hamilton Steelhawks	OHL	24	2	4	6	36	—	—	—	—	—
1986–87	Belleville Bulls	OHL	34	7	6	13	72	—	—	—	—	—
1987–88	Belleville Bulls	OHL	63	29	39	68	169	—	—	—	—	—
1988–89	Belleville Bulls	OHL	46	24	21	45	137	—	—	—	—	—
1988–89	New Haven Nighthawks	AHL	15	5	5	10	24	—	—	—	—	—
1989–90	New Haven Nighthawks	AHL	51	9	13	22	124	—	—	—	—	—
1990–91	New Haven Nighthawks	AHL	57	14	11	25	278	—	—	—	—	—
1990–91	Phoenix Roadrunners	IHL	12	1	2	3	53	7	1	0	1	12
1991–92	Phoenix Roadrunners	IHL	48	8	19	27	219	—	—	—	—	—
1991–92	New Haven Nighthawks	AHL	13	0	2	2	69	—	—	—	—	—
1992–93	Los Angeles Kings	NHL	2	0	0	0	10	—	—	—	—	—
1992–93	Phoenix Roadrunners	IHL	61	18	7	25	314	—	—	—	—	—
1993–94	Phoenix Roadrunners	IHL	52	11	18	29	237	—	—	—	—	—
1994–95	Detroit Vipers	IHL	66	10	12	22	268	4	0	0	0	14
1995–96	Detroit Vipers	IHL	72	8	19	27	294	12	0	3	3	30
1996–97	Long Beach Ice Dogs	IHL	82	13	17	30	215	14	2	2	4	26
1997–98	Long Beach Ice Dogs	IHL	82	16	17	33	184	17	6	6	12	52
1998–99	Long Beach Ice Dogs	IHL	65	13	15	28	122	—	—	—	—	—
IHL totals			540	98	126	224	1906	54	9	11	20	134
NHL totals			2	0	0	0	10	—	—	—	—	—
