= Ken McRae =

Canadian ice hockey player (born 1968)

- Born: April 23, 1968 (age 58) Winchester, Ontario, Canada
- Height: 6 ft 1 in (185 cm)
- Weight: 195 lb (88 kg; 13 st 13 lb)
- Position: Right wing
- Shot: Right
- Played for: Quebec Nordiques; Toronto Maple Leafs
- NHL draft: 18th overall, 1986; Quebec Nordiques
- Playing career: 1987–1998

Kenneth Duncan McRae (born April 23, 1968) is a Canadian professional ice hockey coach and former player. McRae is the former head coach of the Peterborough Petes of the Ontario Hockey League. McRae is also a former right wing who played 137 games in the National Hockey League (NHL) with the Quebec Nordiques and Toronto Maple Leafs. He was drafted by the Nordiques in the first round, 18th overall, in the 1986 NHL entry draft.

== Playing career ==
Born in Winchester, Ontario, McRae played his junior hockey with the Sudbury Wolves and Hamilton Steelhawks from 1984–88, where he was a highly touted prospect. The Quebec Nordiques drafted McRae in the first round of the 1986 NHL entry draft, and he appeared in his first NHL game with the team in the 1987–88 season. McRae played in 126 with the Nordiques before being traded to the Toronto Maple Leafs on July 21, 1992 for Len Esau.

McRae only played 11 games with Toronto from 1992–94, as he spent most of his time in the American Hockey League (AHL) with the St. John's Maple Leafs and McRae spent the remainder of his career in the AHL and the International Hockey League (IHL). McRae ended his career with 137 NHL games, scoring 14 goals and 21 assists for 35 points, and 364 penalty minutes.

== Coaching career ==
Upon his retirement from playing, McRae became an assistant coach with the Austin Ice Bats of the Western Professional Hockey League. McRae then became the head coach of the Indianapolis Ice of the Central Hockey League in 2002, as he led the Ice to the best record in the Northeast Division with a 39–16–9 record in the 2002–03 season before losing in the second round of the playoffs. McRae was named CHL coach of the year for 2002-03. McRae returned to Indianapolis in 2003–04, as the team had a 37–23–4 record, finishing in second in the Northeast, however, the team lost in the first round of the playoffs.

From 2004–08, McRae was the head coach of the Corpus Christi Rayz, as he led the team to a 106–116–28 record in his four years with the team. His best season with the Rayz was in 2006–07, as the team had a 35–22–7 record.

In the summer of 2008, the Peterborough Petes of the Ontario Hockey League hired McRae to become their new head coach. On March 31, 2010 it was announced that McRae's contract as head coach of the Petes would not be renewed.

== Career statistics ==
			Regular season					Playoffs
Season	Team	League	GP	G	A	Pts	PIM	GP	G	A	Pts	PIM
1984–85	Hawkesbury Hawks	CJHL	51	38	50	88	77	—	—	—	—	—
1985–86	Sudbury Wolves	OHL	66	25	40	65	127	4	2	1	3	12
1986–87	Sudbury Wolves	OHL	21	12	15	27	40	—	—	—	—	—
1986–87	Hamilton Steelhawks	OHL	20	7	12	19	25	7	1	1	2	12
1987–88	Hamilton Steelhawks	OHL	62	30	55	85	158	14	13	9	22	35
1987–88	Quebec Nordiques	NHL	1	0	0	0	0	—	—	—	—	—
1987–88	Fredericton Express	AHL	—	—	—	—	—	3	0	0	0	8
1988–89	Halifax Citadels	AHL	41	20	21	41	87	—	—	—	—	—
1988–89	Quebec Nordiques	NHL	37	6	11	17	68	—	—	—	—	—
1989–90	Quebec Nordiques	NHL	66	7	8	15	191	—	—	—	—	—
1990–91	Halifax Citadels	AHL	60	10	36	46	193	—	—	—	—	—
1990–91	Quebec Nordiques	NHL	12	0	0	0	36	—	—	—	—	—
1991–92	Halifax Citadels	AHL	52	30	41	71	184	—	—	—	—	—
1991–92	Quebec Nordiques	NHL	10	0	1	1	31	—	—	—	—	—
1992–93	St. John's Maple Leafs	AHL	64	30	44	74	135	9	6	6	12	27
1992–93	Toronto Maple Leafs	NHL	2	0	0	0	2	—	—	—	—	—
1993–94	St. John's Maple Leafs	AHL	65	23	41	64	200	—	—	—	—	—
1993–94	Toronto Maple Leafs	NHL	9	1	1	2	36	6	0	0	0	4
1994–95	Detroit Vipers	IHL	24	4	9	13	38	—	—	—	—	—
1994–95	Phoenix Roadrunners	IHL	2	2	0	2	0	9	3	8	11	21
1995–96	Phoenix Roadrunners	IHL	45	11	14	25	102	4	1	1	2	24
1996–97	Phoenix Roadrunners	IHL	72	25	28	53	190	—	—	—	—	—
1996–97	Providence Bruins	AHL	9	5	5	10	26	10	1	3	4	17
1997–98	Houston Aeros	IHL	78	22	32	54	192	1	0	0	0	0
NHL totals			137	14	21	35	364	6	0	0	0	4
AHL totals			291	118	188	306	825	22	7	9	16	52
IHL totals			221	64	83	147	522	14	4	9	13	45

== Coaching record ==
Team	Year	Regular season							Post season
Team	Year	G	W	L	T	OTL	Pts	Finish	Result
IND	2002–03	64	39	16	-	9	87	1st in Northeast	Lost in second round
IND	2003–04	64	37	23	-	4	78	2nd in Northeast	Lost in first round
COR	2004–05	60	28	25	-	7	63	2nd in Southeast	Missed playoffs
COR	2005–06	64	22	36	-	6	50	4th in Southeast	Missed playoffs
COR	2006–07	64	35	22	-	7	77	2nd in Southeast	Lost in second round
COR	2007–08	64	22	34	-	8	52	3rd in Southeast	Missed playoffs
PBO	2008–09	68	28	37	-	3	59	3rd in East	Lost in first round
PBO	2009–10	68	29	35	-	4	62	3rd in East	Lost in first round

Preceded by David Latta	Quebec Nordiques first-round draft pick 1986	Succeeded by Bryan Fogarty
Preceded by Vince Malette	Head coaches of the Peterborough Petes; 2008–2010	Succeeded by Dave Reid
