= Dave Andreychuk Mountain Arena & Skating Centre =

Recreation complex in Hamilton, Ontario

Coordinates: 43.225388°N 79.881002°W

The Dave
- The Dave
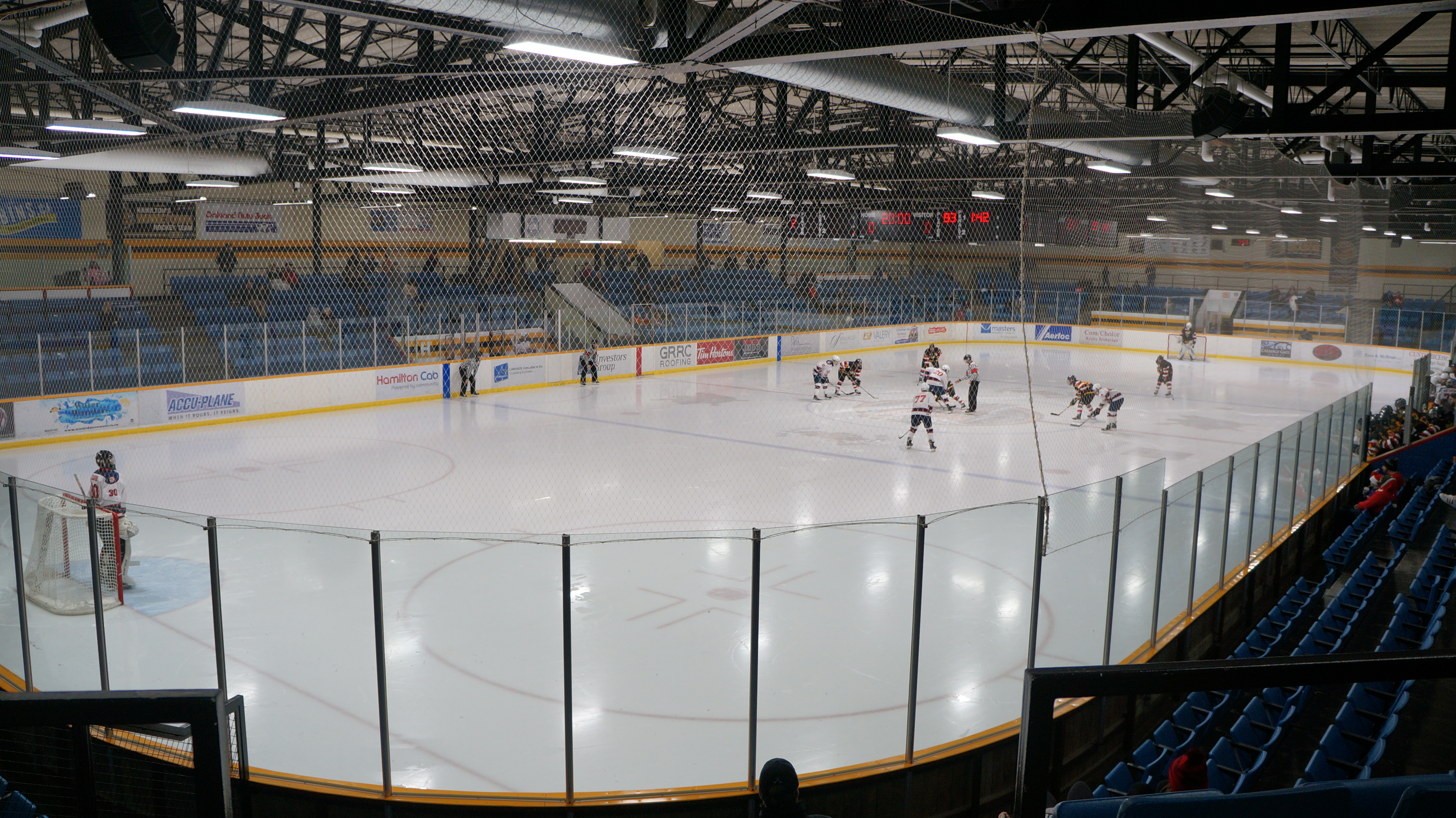
- Interactive map of The Dave
- Location: 25 Hester Street, Hamilton, Ontario
- Owner: City of Hamilton
- Operator: City of Hamilton
- Capacity: Ice hockey 2,500

Construction
- Opened: 1966

Tenants
- Fincups (1977–1978); Steelhawks (1984–1985); Hamilton Red Wings (1973-2015); Hamilton Steelhawks (2015–present); Hamilton Kilty B's (2018–present)

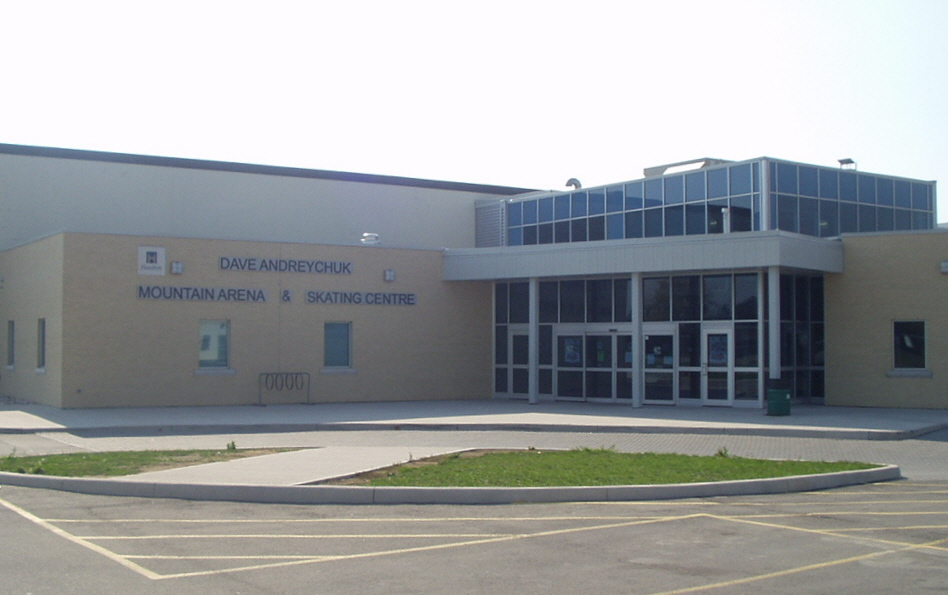
Exterior

The Dave Andreychuk Mountain Arena & Skating Centre is a recreation complex in Hamilton, Ontario, Canada. It includes a figure skating rink and a 2,500-seat ice hockey arena. Originally it was built in 1966, known as the Mountain Arena until it was renovated in 2005 and renamed in honour of Dave Andreychuk, a former ice hockey player from Hamilton.

== Tenants ==
On two brief occasions, the arena was home to Hamilton teams in the Ontario Hockey League, the Fincups (1977–1978) and the Steelhawks (1984–1985). From 1973 to 2015 it was home to Hamilton Red Wings of the Ontario Junior Hockey League and is the home of the Hamilton Jr. B Bengals lacrosse.

Currently the Junior B Hamilton Kilty B's hockey team, Jr. B and Senior B Hamilton Bengals lacrosse teams play out of the arena.
