= Seedorf, Switzerland =

Seedorf may refer to:

- Seedorf, Berne, a municipality in the Canton of Berne (Seedorf BE)
- Seedorf, Uri, a municipality in the Canton of Uri (Seedorf UR)
