= 1987–88 OHL season =

Junior ice hockey season

The 1987–88 OHL season was the eighth season of the Ontario Hockey League. The OHL inaugurates the OHL Goaltender of the Year award. Fifteen teams each played 66 games. The Windsor Spitfires won the J. Ross Robertson Cup, defeating the Peterborough Petes.

== Regular season ==
=== Final standings ===
Note: GP = Games played; W = Wins; L = Losses; T = Ties; GF = Goals for; GA = Goals against; PTS = Points; x = clinched playoff berth; y = clinched division title

=== Leyden Division ===
Rank	Team	GP	W	L	T	PTS	GF	GA
1	y-Peterborough Petes	66	44	17	5	93	323	212
2	x-Ottawa 67's	66	38	26	2	78	341	294
3	x-Cornwall Royals	66	35	24	7	77	333	255
4	x-Belleville Bulls	66	32	30	4	68	297	275
5	x-Oshawa Generals	66	32	31	3	67	278	288
6	x-Toronto Marlboros	66	26	39	1	53	292	348
7	Kingston Canadians	66	14	52	0	28	246	432

=== Emms Division ===
Rank	Team	GP	W	L	T	PTS	GF	GA
1	y-Windsor Compuware Spitfires	66	50	14	2	102	396	215
2	x-London Knights	66	40	22	4	84	309	273
3	x-Hamilton Steelhawks	66	35	28	3	73	327	291
4	x-North Bay Centennials	66	31	30	5	67	284	257
5	x-Sault Ste. Marie Greyhounds	66	32	33	1	65	272	294
6	x-Kitchener Rangers	66	26	39	1	53	263	329
7	Guelph Platers	66	21	40	5	47	249	318
8	Sudbury Wolves	66	17	48	1	35	208	339

=== Scoring leaders ===
Player	Team	GP	G	A	Pts	PIM
Andrew Cassels	Ottawa 67's	61	48	103	151	39
Len Soccio	North Bay Centennials	66	53	82	135	79
Kelly Cain	Windsor Spitfires	66	57	76	133	66
Sean Williams	Oshawa Generals	65	58	65	123	38
Dan Rowbotham	Ottawa 67's	65	43	79	122	20
Stan Drulia	Hamilton Steelhawks	65	52	69	121	44
Ron Goodall	Kitchener Rangers//London Knights	62	63	56	119	18
Larry Mitchell	Cornwall Royals	66	49	66	115	106
Mike Wolak	Windsor Spitfires	63	42	72	114	86
Dan Currie	Sault Ste. Marie Greyhounds	57	50	59	109	53

== Playoffs ==
Division quarterfinals
L1	Peterborough	4
L6	Toronto	0
L3	Cornwall	4
L4	Belleville	2
L2	Ottawa	4
L5	Oshawa	3
E1	Windsor	4
E6	Kitchener	0
E3	Hamilton	4
E4	North Bay	0
E2	London	4
E5	S.S. Marie	2

Quarterfinals
L1	Peterborough	bye
L2	Ottawa	4
L3	Cornwall	1
E1	Windsor	bye
E2	London	2
E3	Hamilton	4

Semifinals
L1	Peterborough	4
L2	Ottawa	0
E1	Windsor	4
E3	Hamilton	0

Finals
L1	Peterborough	0
E1	Windsor	4

=== Division quarter-finals ===
==== Leyden Division ====
===== (1) Peterborough Petes vs. (6) Toronto Marlboros =====
March 20	Peterborough Petes	9 – 8	Toronto Marlboros	Maple Leaf Gardens

March 22	Toronto Marlboros	1 – 5	Peterborough Petes	Peterborough Memorial Centre

March 24	Toronto Marlboros	3 – 6	Peterborough Petes	Peterborough Memorial Centre

March 26	Peterborough Petes	2 – 1	Toronto Marlboros	Maple Leaf Gardens

Peterborough wins series 4 – 0

===== (2) Ottawa 67's vs. (5) Oshawa Generals =====
March 20	Oshawa Generals	4 – 3	OT	Ottawa 67's	Ottawa Civic Centre

March 22	Ottawa 67's	2 – 4	Oshawa Generals	Oshawa Civic Auditorium

March 25	Oshawa Generals	3 – 1	Ottawa 67's	Ottawa Civic Centre

March 26	Ottawa 67's	6 – 5	OT	Oshawa Generals	Oshawa Civic Auditorium

March 27	Oshawa Generals	3 – 8	Ottawa 67's	Ottawa Civic Centre

March 29	Ottawa 67's	7 – 2	Oshawa Generals	Oshawa Civic Auditorium

March 30	Oshawa Generals	0 – 5	Ottawa 67's	Ottawa Civic Centre

Ottawa wins series 4 – 3

===== (3) Cornwall Royals vs. (4) Belleville Bulls =====
March 20	Belleville Bulls	4 – 6	Cornwall Royals	Cornwall Civic Complex

March 23	Cornwall Royals	4 – 2	Belleville Bulls	Yardmen Arena

March 24	Belleville Bulls	3 – 5	Cornwall Royals	Cornwall Civic Complex

March 26	Cornwall Royals	2 – 4	Belleville Bulls	Yardmen Arena

March 28	Belleville Bulls	7 – 3	Cornwall Royals	Cornwall Civic Complex

March 29	Cornwall Royals	4 – 3	Belleville Bulls	Yardmen Arena

Cornwall wins series 4 – 2

==== Emms Division ====
===== (1) Windsor Compuware Spitfires vs. (6) Kitchener Rangers =====
March 21	Kitchener Rangers	5 – 12	Windsor Compuware Spitfires	Windsor Arena

March 22	Windsor Compuware Spitfires	5 – 1	Kitchener Rangers	Kitchener Memorial Auditorium

March 24	Kitchener Rangers	1 – 7	Windsor Compuware Spitfires	Windsor Arena

March 25	Windsor Compuware Spitfires	5 – 4	OT	Kitchener Rangers	Kitchener Memorial Auditorium

Windsor wins series 4 – 0

===== (2) London Knights vs. (5) Sault Ste. Marie Greyhounds =====
March 20	Sault Ste. Marie Greyhounds	4 – 5	OT	London Knights	London Gardens

March 22	London Knights	5 – 3	Sault Ste. Marie Greyhounds	Sault Memorial Gardens

March 25	Sault Ste. Marie Greyhounds	5 – 4	London Knights	London Gardens

March 27	London Knights	3 – 7	Sault Ste. Marie Greyhounds	Sault Memorial Gardens

March 28	Sault Ste. Marie Greyhounds	4 – 5	OT	London Knights	London Gardens

March 29	London Knights	5 – 4	OT	Sault Ste. Marie Greyhounds	Sault Memorial Gardens

London wins series 4 – 2

===== (3) Hamilton Steelhawks vs. (4) North Bay Centennials =====
March 21	North Bay Centennials	2 – 4	Hamilton Steelhawks	Copps Coliseum

March 23	Hamilton Steelhawks	5 – 4	OT	North Bay Centennials	North Bay Memorial Gardens

March 24	North Bay Centennials	4 – 5	Hamilton Steelhawks	Copps Coliseum

March 26	Hamilton Steelhawks	7 – 5	North Bay Centennials	North Bay Memorial Gardens

Hamilton wins series 4 – 0

=== Division semi-finals ===
==== Leyden Division ====
===== (2) Ottawa 67's vs. (3) Cornwall Royals =====
April 3	Ottawa 67's	2 – 1	Cornwall Royals	Cornwall Civic Complex

April 5	Cornwall Royals	2 – 6	Ottawa 67's	Ottawa Civic Centre

April 6	Cornwall Royals	1 – 2	OT	Ottawa 67's	Ottawa Civic Centre

April 7	Ottawa 67's	3 – 5	Cornwall Royals	Cornwall Civic Complex

April 8	Cornwall Royals	1 – 2	Ottawa 67's	Ottawa Civic Centre

Ottawa wins series 4 – 1

==== Emms Division ====
===== (2) London Knights vs. (3) Hamilton Steelhawks =====
April 1	Hamilton Steelhawks	6 – 5	OT	London Knights	London Gardens

April 3	London Knights	6 – 5	Hamilton Steelhawks	Copps Coliseum

April 5	Hamilton Steelhawks	8 – 2	London Knights	London Gardens

April 7	London Knights	11 – 5	Hamilton Steelhawks	Copps Coliseum

April 8	Hamilton Steelhawks	5 – 4	OT	London Knights	London Gardens

April 10	London Knights	4 – 6	Hamilton Steelhawks	Copps Coliseum

Hamilton wins series 4 – 2

=== Division finals ===
==== Leyden Division ====
===== (1) Peterborough Petes vs. (2) Ottawa 67's =====
April 12	Ottawa 67's	2 – 4	Peterborough Petes	Peterborough Memorial Centre

April 14	Ottawa 67's	3 – 7	Peterborough Petes	Peterborough Memorial Centre

April 15	Peterborough Petes	6 – 3	Ottawa 67's	Ottawa Civic Centre

April 17	Peterborough Petes	5 – 4	Ottawa 67's	Ottawa Civic Centre

Peterborough wins series 4 – 0

==== Emms Division ====
===== (1) Windsor Compuware Spitfires vs. (3) Hamilton Steelhawks =====
April 12	Hamilton Steelhawks	4 – 5	OT	Windsor Compuware Spitfires	Windsor Arena

April 14	Windsor Compuware Spitfires	8 – 1	Hamilton Steelhawks	Copps Coliseum

April 16	Hamilton Steelhawks	3 – 10	Windsor Compuware Spitfires	Windsor Arena

April 17	Windsor Compuware Spitfires	5 – 4	Hamilton Steelhawks	Copps Coliseum

Windsor wins series 4 – 0

=== J. Ross Robertson Cup ===
==== (E1) Windsor Spitfires vs. (L1) Peterborough Petes ====
April 22	Peterborough Petes	4 – 7	Windsor Spitfires	Windsor Arena

April 24	Windsor Spitfires	5 – 3	Peterborough Petes	Peterborough Memorial Centre

April 26	Peterborough Petes	3 – 5	Windsor Spitfires	Windsor Arena

April 28	Windsor Spitfires	5 – 2	Peterborough Petes	Peterborough Memorial Centre

Windsor wins series 4 – 0

== Awards ==
J. Ross Robertson Cup:	Windsor Spitfires
Hamilton Spectator Trophy:	Windsor Spitfires
Leyden Trophy:	Peterborough Petes
Emms Trophy:	Windsor Spitfires
Red Tilson Trophy:	Andrew Cassels, Ottawa 67's
Eddie Powers Memorial Trophy:	Andrew Cassels, Ottawa 67's
Matt Leyden Trophy:	Dick Todd, Peterborough Petes
Jim Mahon Memorial Trophy:	Sean Williams, Oshawa Generals
Max Kaminsky Trophy:	Darryl Shannon, Windsor Spitfires
OHL Goaltender of the Year:	Rick Tabaracci, Cornwall Royals
Jack Ferguson Award:	Drake Berehowsky, Kingston Raiders
Dave Pinkney Trophy:	John Tanner and Todd Bojcun, Peterborough Petes
Emms Family Award:	Rick Corriveau, London Knights
F. W. "Dinty" Moore Trophy:	Todd Bojcun, Peterborough Petes
William Hanley Trophy:	Andrew Cassels, Ottawa 67's
Leo Lalonde Memorial Trophy:	Len Soccio, North Bay Centennials
Bobby Smith Trophy:	Darrin Shannon, Windsor Spitfires

== 1988 OHL Priority Selection ==
The Kingston Raiders held the first overall pick in the 1988 Ontario Priority Selection and selected Drake Berehowsky from the Barrie Colts. Berehowsky was awarded the Jack Ferguson Award, awarded to the top pick in the draft.

Below are the players who were selected in the first round of the 1988 Ontario Hockey League Priority Selection.

#	Player	Nationality	OHL Team	Hometown	Minor Team
1	Drake Berehowsky (D)	Canada	Kingston Raiders	Toronto, Ontario	Barrie Colts
2	Adam Bennett (D)	Canada	Sudbury Wolves	Georgetown, Ontario	Georgetown Gemini
3	Grayden Reid (C)	Canada	Guelph Platers	Mississauga, Ontario	Toronto Red Wings
4	Bill Kovacs (LW)	Canada	Toronto Marlboros	Burlington, Ontario	Burlington Cougars
5	Brad Barton (D)	Canada	Kitchener Rangers	Uxbridge, Ontario	Pickering Panthers
6	Bob Boughner (D)	Canada	Sault Ste. Marie Greyhounds	Windsor, Ontario	St. Mary's Lincolns
7	John Vary (D)	Canada	North Bay Centennials	Owen Sound, Ontario	Owen Sound Greys
8	Jean-Paul Davis (D)	Canada	Oshawa Generals	Oshawa, Ontario	Oshawa Midgets
9	Rob Pearson (RW)	Canada	Belleville Bulls	Oshawa, Ontario	Oshawa Midgets
10	Mark Lawrence (RW)	Canada	Hamilton Dukes	Burlington, Ontario	Burlington Cougars
11	John Slaney (D)	Canada	Cornwall Royals	St. John's, Newfoundland	St. John's Midgets
12	Jerrett DeFazio (LW)	Canada	Ottawa 67's	Ottawa, Ontario	Ottawa Jr. Senators
13	Louie DeBrusk (LW)	Canada	London Knights	Port Elgin, Ontario	Stratford Cullitons
14	Scott Campbell (D)	Canada	Peterborough Petes	Scarborough, Ontario	Don Mills Bantams
15	Karl Taylor (LW)	Canada	Windsor Compuware Spitfires	North Bay, Ontario	Barrie Colts

== See also ==
- List of OHA Junior A standings
- List of OHL seasons
- 1988 Memorial Cup
- 1988 NHL entry draft
- 1987 in sports
- 1988 in sports

Preceded by 1986–87 OHL season	OHL seasons	Succeeded by 1988–89 OHL season
