= Forest City Velodrome =

Cycling facility in London, Ontario

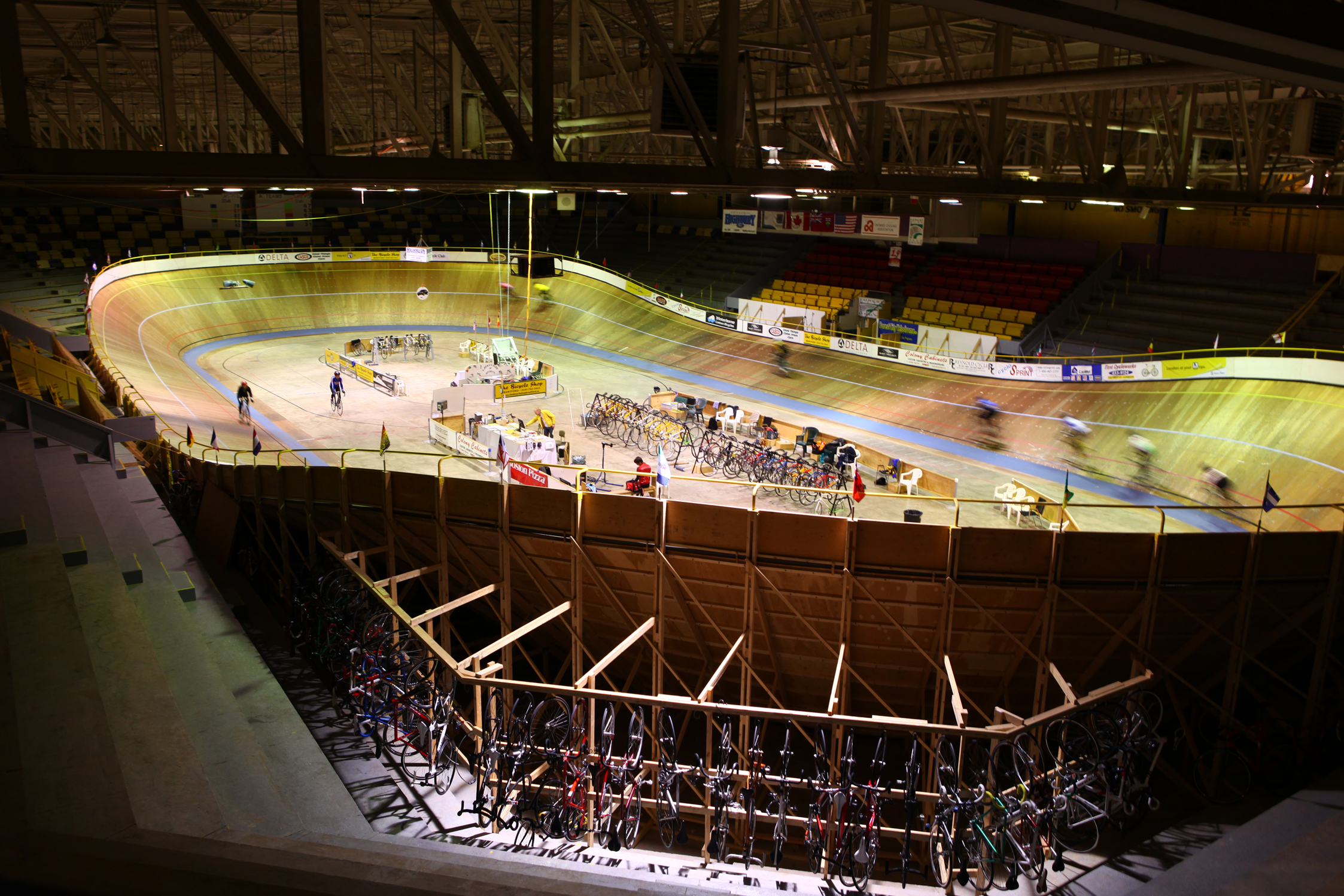
- Interactive map of Forest City Velodrome
- Location: 4380 Wellington Rd S, London, Ontario, Canada
- Coordinates: 42.918886°N 81.204650°W
- Owner: Forest City Velodrome Association
- Operator: Forest City Velodrome Association
- Capacity: over 3,000
- Surface: Wood
- Field size: 138-metre oval

Construction
- Opened: 1965; 61 years ago
- Renovated: 2005; 21 years ago

The Forest City Velodrome is an indoor cycling facility in London, Ontario, Canada. The building was constructed in 1963 as the London Gardens, home to the London Knights ice hockey team. In 1994, it was renamed the London Ice House. After the Knights moved to the newly-built John Labatt Centre (now Canada Life Place) in downtown London in 2002, the building was remodeled into the Forest City Velodrome in early 2005 by local cycling enthusiast and track racer Rob Good and Albert Coulier's Apollo Velodrome Systems company.

When the Forest City Velodrome first opened in 2005, it was the first indoor velodrome in Ontario and the second in Canada. Today, it is one of two velodromes in Ontario and one of five indoor cycling facilities in all North America.

The Forest City Velodrome is the shortest permanent velodrome in the world, measuring 138 metres with 50-degree bankings and 17-degree straights.

The Forest City Velodrome runs several programs designed to encourage recreational cycling and develop competitive cyclists. Learn to ride programs introduce new riders to track cycling. Organized drills help cyclists hone their skills. Frequent recreational sessions give riders of various skill levels time to ride on the track for fun, fitness and training. Periodic race nights develop racing skills and give spectators the chance to learn about and enjoy track cycling events. In 2013, the track hosted the Ontario Provincial Track Championships.

== 2019 24-Hour Track Attack ==
In February 2019, Canadian Hour record-holder and former National Team cyclist Ed Veal rode the Forest City Velodrome for 24 hours to set a new Canadian record for distance covered over the period, and to raise money to support upgrades and renovations of the facility. Over $50,000 was raised by the event. Members of the Forest City Velodrome contributed to the event as support riders for Veal during the event.

== Closures and reopenings ==
In June 2023, the Forest City Velodrome announced that due to an inability to come to an agreement with its landlord on a lease extension, the facility would close effective June 30, 2023. On October 30, 2023, after cyclists raised money to save the facility, the Velodrome re-opened.

It was again announced on August 29, 2025 that the Forest City Velodrome would permanently close due to a reported lack of viability amid declining membership numbers. On October 4, 2025, it was reported that a donation from local developer 401 L Inc. would keep the facility open for another year.

== See also ==
- List of cycling tracks and velodromes
