= Larry Mitchell (ice hockey) =

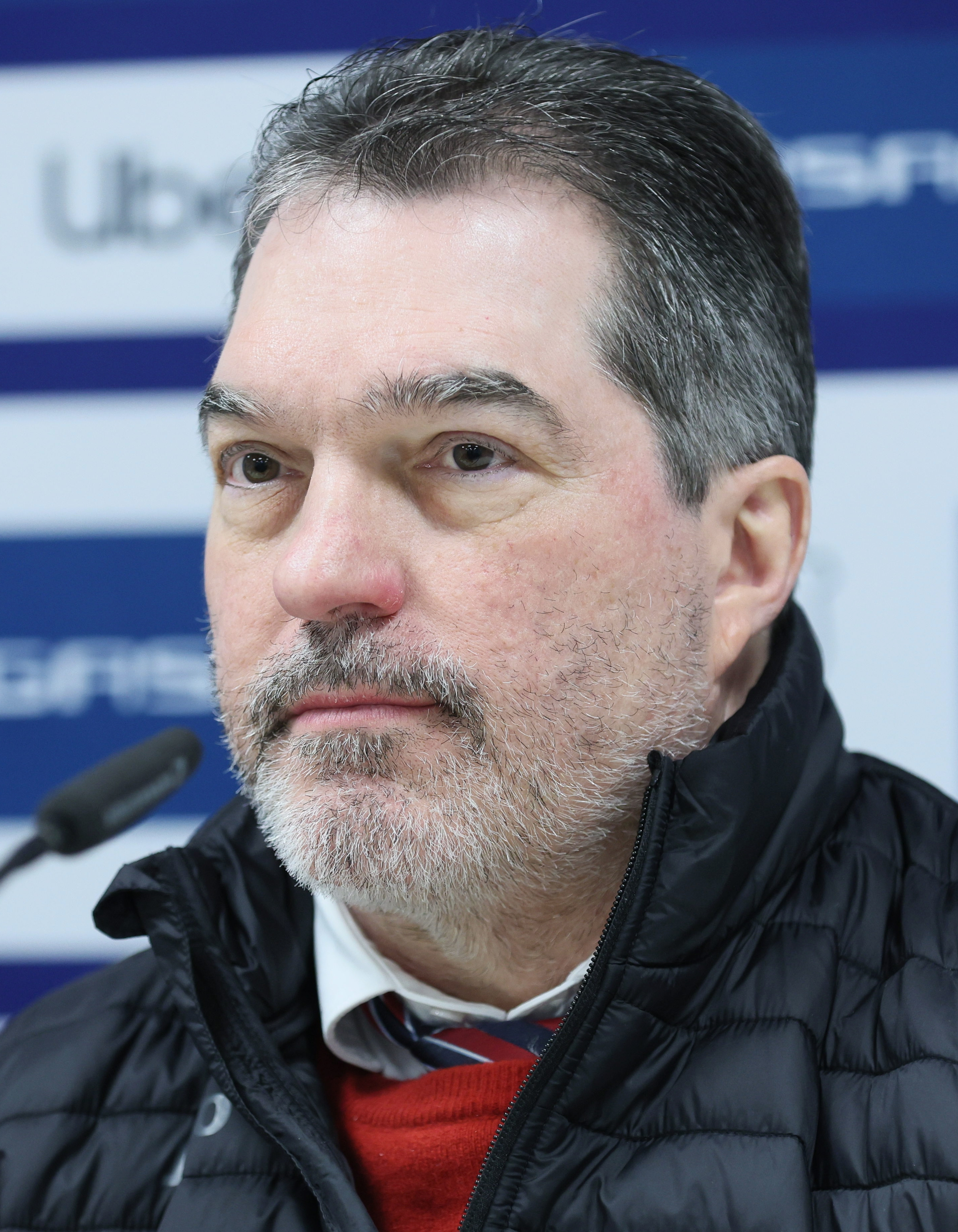
- Larry Mitchell in 2015
- Born: June 2, 1967 (age 58) Zweibrücken, West Germany
- Height: 5 ft 11 in (180 cm)
- Weight: 185 lb (84 kg; 13 st 3 lb)
- Position: Right wing
- Shot: Right
- Played for: Dinslakener EC; TEV Miesbach; EC Peiting; Krefelder EV 1981; Grefather EC; EA Kempten; EA Schongau; EHC Salzgitter; ESC Wedemark; Krefeld Pinguine; EC Hannover; Wedemark Scorpions; EC Bad Nauheim; SC Bietigheim-Bissingen; ESV Bayreuth; EV Duisburg
- Playing career: 1988–2002

Larry Mitchell (born June 2, 1967) is a German-born Canadian professional ice hockey coach and a former professional ice hockey player.

== Playing career ==
Mitchell spent his early career in his native Canada, playing for the Brockville Braves in the CJAHL, followed by a stint with OHL's Cornwall Royals.

In 1988, he signed his first contract with a team in Germany, Dinslakener EC of the country's third-tier league. He recorded 70 goals and 59 assists in 38 games for the club. Mitchell then stayed in Germany for the remainder of his professional career, mostly playing for lower league teams. His 14 appearances in the German top-flight Deutsche Eishockey Liga (DEL) for Krefeld and Hannover came between 1995 and 1997. A proven scorer at the 2. Bundesliga level, he tallied 77 goals and 69 assists for ESC Wedemark during the 1995-96 campaign, helping the team to promotion to the DEL.

Mitchell finished his professional playing career in 2002. He returned to Canada and tried to start a career as a talent scout in the NHL, but was not hired by any club. Mitchell then worked as a sales manager, before getting his coaching career underway in Germany.

== Coaching and managing career ==
As a first-year head coach, Mitchell guided Oberliga team EV Landsberg to promotion to the 2. Bundesliga in 2006.

Midway through the 2007-08 campaign, he accepted an offer of DEL side Augsburger Panther, where he then spent seven years as head coach. He was the man behind the team's impressive run to the 2010 DEL finals, the Panthers' greatest success since winning the 2. Bundesliga championship in 1994. Under his guidance, Augsburg reached the DEL playoffs four times. The Panthers and Mitchell parted ways in December 2014 after a run of bad results.

Only a couple of days later, Mitchell was appointed new head coach of fellow DEL side Straubing Tigers. In the 2015–16 season, he guided the Tigers to the DEL quarterfinals, where they fell short to München, the team that went on to win the championship that year. He parted ways with the Straubing team by mutual consent at the conclusion of the 2016-17 campaign. Mitchell is said to have a knack for spotting talented prospects.

On March 28, 2017, Mitchell was named sporting director of DEL club ERC Ingolstadt. His tenure ended in April 2022. On November 1, 2022, EHC Kloten hired Mitchell as sporting director. When Kloten sacked head coach Gerry Fleming in November 2023, Mitchell was handed the head coach job on an interim basis. He also served as an assistant coach for Team Canada at the 2023 Spengler Cup. Mitchell ended his interim stint as Kloten head coach on January 27, 2024, returning full time to his actual job as sporting director of the club. He parted ways with EHC Kloten at the end of March 2024.

On April 19, 2024, the Augsburger Panther of the German DEL announced the signing of Larry Mitchell as sporting director. On November 27, 2024, Mitchell was also appointed as Augsburg's caretaker coach following the dismissal of head coach Ted Dent.

== Personal info ==
Mitchell was born in Zweibrücken, Germany, where his father, a soldier in the Canadian army, served at the time. The family returned to Canada, when Mitchell was a child.
