= London Ice House =

Indoor arena now a velodrome in London, Ontario

Coordinates: 42.917793°N 81.207214°W

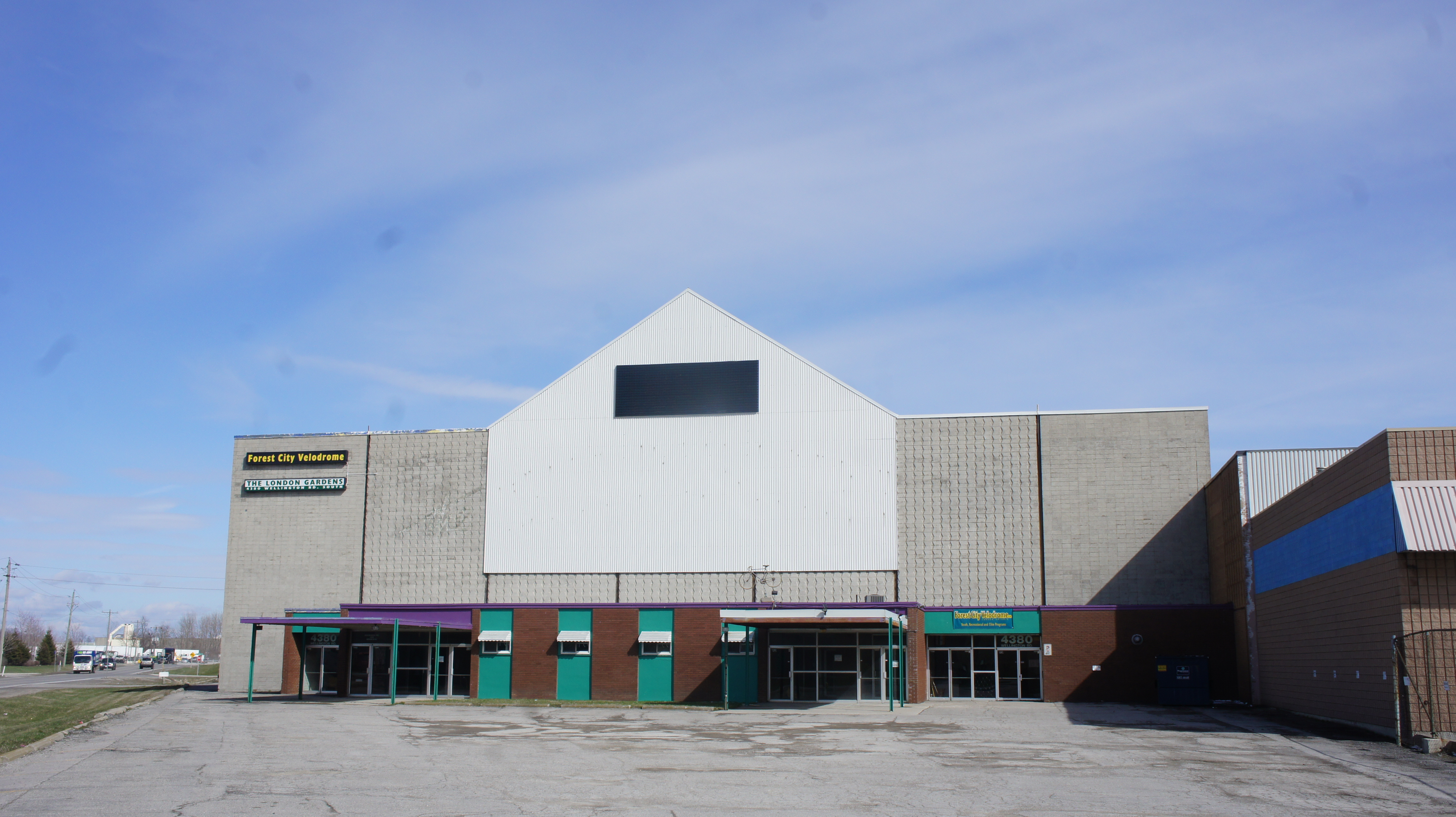
- Exterior as the Forest City Velodrome
- Interactive map of London Ice House
- Former names: Treasure Island Gardens, London Gardens
- Location: 4380 Wellington Road South, London, ON, N6E 3A2
- Owner: London Knights Hockey Club
- Capacity: 5,000 (approx.)
- Surface: 190' X 85'

Construction
- Groundbreaking: 1960
- Opened: 1963
- Renovated: 1994
- Closed: 2002

Tenants
- London Knights (OHL) 1965-2002; London Nationals (WOHL) 1991-2002; London Wildcats (CoHL) 1994-95

The London Ice House was an arena in London, Ontario, Canada. It was originally built in 1963 and was home to the London Knights ice hockey team from 1965 to 2002. The design was influenced by the first level of the Boston Garden, and had a capacity of approximately 5,000. The arena was originally named Treasure Island Gardens as the building was a part of the Treasure Island Plaza mall complex located in south London. For a time, the arena also included a second ice pad.

In 1994, the London Knights and the building were purchased by new owner Doug Tarry, who renamed building as the London Ice House. Tarry upgraded the building in 1994, including replacing the seats on the sides and adding more emergency exits to bring the building up to the fire code. In the years following the refurbishment, Tarry allowed the building to deteriorate as part of his lobbying the city for a new arena, given that it was the only arena in the OHL without municipal assistance, and was charged taxes in excess of $125,000 per year by 1999. The London Knights underwent a renaissance after being purchased by Dale and Mark Hunter.

The team left the Gardens/Ice House after the 2001–02 season and relocated to the newly built John Labatt Centre in Downtown London.

== Concerts ==
The Rolling Stones played at the arena on April 26, 1965, but due to rioting in the audience, the show was shut down by police after only 15 minutes.

Johnny Cash played at the arena (then known as the London Gardens) on February 22, 1968, during which time he proposed to June Carter

== After hockey ==
After the Ice House's closure it was purchased by investors who turned it into a motocross facility called the London Motoplex; however, the investment group were not making payments during their ownership. The ownership of the building returned to the Hunter brothers afterward. Most of the old seats and all of the hockey memorabilia was sold at auction. The 1994-era seats were purchased by the Windsor Spitfires organization, who installed them at the Windsor Arena.

After 2004, a group of investors (made up of business, community, and government investment) converted the former hockey arena and motocross track into an indoor cycling track, called the Forest City Velodrome. The Forest City Velodrome Association (a non-profit organization) operates the races, clinics, and other activities at the track.
