= Kilrea (disambiguation) =

Kilrea could refer to the following:

- Kilrea, County Londonderry, Northern Ireland, a village
  - Kilrea GAC, Gaelic sports club in the Londonderry village
- Kilrea, County Armagh, Northern Ireland, a townland; see List of townlands in County Armagh

== Ice hockey personnel ==
- Brian Kilrea, coach and former player
- Hec Kilrea, player
- Ken Kilrea (ice hockey), player
- Wally Kilrea, player
