= Brett MacDonald =

Canadian ice hockey player

- Born: January 5, 1966 (age 59); Bothwell, Ontario, Canada
- Height: 6 ft 0 in (183 cm)
- Weight: 195 lb (88 kg; 13 st 13 lb)
- Position: Defence
- Shot: Left
- Played for: 2.GBun; Krefeld EV; AHL; Fredericton Express; Moncton Hawks; New Haven Nighthawks; CoHL; Chatham Wheels; Flint Bulldogs; Flint Generals; Muskegon Fury; Saginaw Wheels; ECHL; Nashville Knights; IHL; Flint Spirits; Orlando Solar Bears; San Diego Gulls; NHL; Vancouver Canucks; UHL; Flint Generals
- NHL draft: 94th overall, 1984; Vancouver Canucks
- Playing career: 1986–1999

Brett MacDonald (born January 5, 1966) is a Canadian former professional ice hockey player who played in one National Hockey League game with the Vancouver Canucks during the 1987–88 NHL season, on February 14, 1988, against the Edmonton Oilers. The rest of his career was spent in the minor leagues, including several years in the Colonial Hockey League/United Hockey League.

== Career statistics ==
=== Regular season and playoffs ===
			Regular season					Playoffs
Season	Team	League	GP	G	A	Pts	PIM	GP	G	A	Pts	PIM
1982–83	Dixie Beehives	OJHL	44	5	18	23	28	—	—	—	—	—
1983–84	North Bay Centennials	OHL	70	8	18	26	83	4	0	1	1	0
1984–85	North Bay Centennials	OHL	58	6	27	33	72	8	1	1	2	11
1985–86	North Bay Centennials	OHL	15	0	6	6	42	—	—	—	—	—
1985–86	Kitchener Rangers	OHL	53	10	27	37	52	5	3	7	10	6
1986–87	Fredericton Express	AHL	49	0	9	9	29	—	—	—	—	—
1987–88	Fredericton Express	AHL	15	1	5	6	23	—	—	—	—	—
1987–88	Vancouver Canucks	NHL	1	0	0	0	0	—	—	—	—	—
1987–88	Flint Spirits	IHL	49	2	21	23	43	15	2	2	4	12
1988–89	Flint Spirits	IHL	57	3	24	27	53	—	—	—	—	—
1988–89	New Haven Nighthawks	AHL	15	2	4	6	6	—	—	—	—	—
1989–90	Krefelder EV 1981	GER-2	26	6	22	28	32	—	—	—	—	—
1990–91	Nashville Knights	ECHL	64	19	62	81	56	—	—	—	—	—
1990–91	Moncton Hawks	AHL	2	0	0	0	0	—	—	—	—	—
1990–91	San Diego Gulls	IHL	3	0	1	1	0	—	—	—	—	—
1991–92	Flint Bulldogs	CoHL	46	12	33	45	23	—	—	—	—	—
1991–92	Moncton Hawks	AHL	3	0	0	0	2	—	—	—	—	—
1992–93	Flint Bulldogs	CoHL	60	12	39	51	60	6	0	5	5	21
1993–94	Chatham Wheels	CoHL	42	8	31	39	29	14	6	9	15	4
1994–95	Saginaw Wheels	CoHL	62	17	42	59	42	—	—	—	—	—
1994–95	Mukegon Fury	CoHL	11	3	8	11	14	16	2	5	7	12
1995–96	Flint Generals	CoHL	62	16	39	55	55	15	1	8	9	2
1995–96	Orlando Solar Bears	IHL	1	0	0	0	2	—	—	—	—	—
1996–97	Flint Generals	CoHL	74	8	64	72	44	14	1	11	12	12
1997–98	Flint Generals	UHL	56	7	37	44	32	17	1	6	7	14
1998–99	Flint Generals	UHL	23	2	9	11	16	12	1	3	4	12
NHL totals			1	0	0	0	0	—	—	—	—	—
CoHL/UHL totals			436	85	302	387	315	94	12	47	59	77

== See also ==
- List of players who played only one game in the NHL
