= Ken Kilrea =

Ken Kilrea may refer to:

- Ken Kilrea (ice hockey) (1919–1990), Canadian ice hockey player
- Ken Kilrea (Canadian football) (1940–2008), Canadian football player
