= Bill Long Award =

- Sport: Ice hockey
- Awarded for: Distinguished service to the OHL

History
- First award: 1989
- Most recent: Larry Mavety (2019)

The Bill Long Award is presented in recognition and appreciation of an individual who has made an outstanding contribution, and distinguished service to the Ontario Hockey League. The recipient must be or have been actively engaged in junior hockey. The Bill Long Award is not awarded annually, but rather bestowed upon notable achievements over time, as noted by the OHL board of governors. The award was initiated in 1989 to commemorate the efforts and contributions of Bill Long, spanning over three decades as a coach and manager of the Niagara Falls Flyers, Ottawa 67's, and the London Knights.

== Recipients ==
List of recipients of the Bill Long Award.

Season	Recipient	Organization
1988–89	Earl Montagano	Ottawa 67's
1988–89	Alec Campagnaro	Guelph Platers
1989–90	Sherwood Bassin	Oshawa Generals; Sault Ste. Marie Greyhounds
1991–92	Herb Warr	Peterborough Petes
1992–93	Dr. Robert L. Vaughan	Belleville Bulls
1993–94	Brian Kilrea	Ottawa 67's
1996–97	Wren Blair	Kingston Frontenacs
1996–97	Frank Bonello	Ontario Hockey League
2001–02	Jack Ferguson	Ontario Hockey League
2001–02	Jim Lever	Ontario Hockey League
2002–03	Norm Bryan	Peterborough Petes
2004–05	Bert Templeton	Hamilton Fincups; Niagara Falls Flyers; North Bay Centennials; Barrie Colts; Sudbury Wolves
2005–06	Jeff Twohey	Peterborough Petes
2007–08	Don Brankley	London Knights
2007–08	Gil Hughes	Oshawa Generals
2008–09	Bert O'Brien	Ottawa 67's
2008–09	Sam Sisco	Ontario Hockey League
2009–10	Peter Karmanos Jr	Plymouth Whalers
2012–13	Ray McKelvie	Owen Sound Attack
2015–16	Pat Casey	Peterborough Petes
2018–19	Larry Mavety	Belleville Bulls; Kingston Raiders; Kingston Frontenacs

== See also ==
- List of Canadian Hockey League awards
