= Tom Barrett (ice hockey) =

Canadian ice hockey coach

- Born: Canada
- Died: 2 April 1996
- Position: Left wing
- Played for: NEHL; Cape Cod Freedoms; Utica Mohawks
- NHL draft: Undrafted
- Playing career: 1983–1984

Tom Barrett (died 2 April 1996) was a Canadian ice hockey coach.

== Career ==
Barrett joined the Kitchener Rangers of the Ontario Hockey League (OHL) as head coach for the 1983–84 OHL season. In his first season behind their bench he steered Kitchner to the best record in the OHL with 106 points, and Barrett was awarded the Matt Leyden Trophy as OHL Coach of the Year. He stayed with the Rangers until midway through the 1986–87 season when he was replaced by Joe McDonnell.

In 1993 he joined the Chatham Wheels of the Colonial Hockey League (CoHL) as head coach, and was named the CoHL's coach of the Year after guiding the Wheels to a 39-18-7 record for their final year in Chatham. In 1994 he relocated with the team to Saginaw, Michigan where he continued to coach the Saginaw Wheels until he was replaced by his assistant, Mike Zruna, part-way through the 1995–96 season. Barrett then returned to the OHL where he served as coach and general manager for the London Knights until his death from lung cancer following the 1995–96 season.

== Awards and honours ==
Honours	Year
Matt Leyden Trophy - OHL Coach of the Year	1983–84
Colonial Hockey League Coach of the Year	1993–94
