= Gary Agnew =

Canadian ice hockey coach

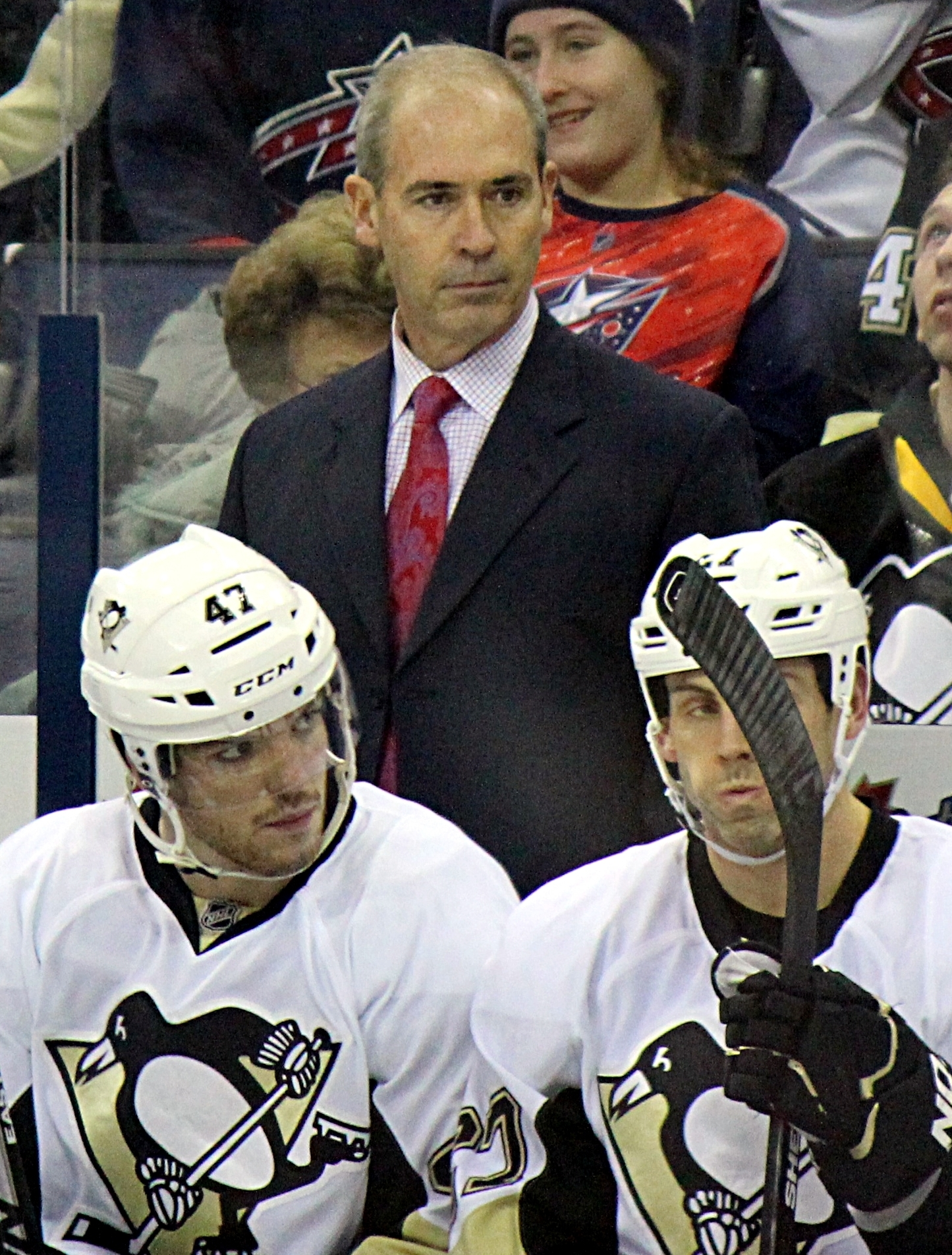
- Agnew as an assistant coach with the Pittsburgh Penguins in 2014.
- Born: May 24, 1960 (age 66) Niagara Falls, Ontario, Canada
- Position: Forward
- Shot: Right
- Played for: Fredericton Express (AHL); Milwaukee Admirals (IHL)
- NHL draft: Undrafted
- Playing career: 1981–1983

Gary Agnew (born May 24, 1960) is a Canadian ice hockey coach currently serving as an associate coach with the Abbotsford Canucks. He was formerly an assistant coach with the Pittsburgh Penguins of the National Hockey League. He has also served as an assistant coach with the St. Louis Blues and Columbus Blue Jackets of the National Hockey League.

== Playing career ==
As a player, Agnew played four years for the University of New Brunswick, and then for the Fredericton Express of the American Hockey League and the Milwaukee Admirals of the International Hockey League.

== Coaching career ==
In 1990 Agnew took over the head coaching job of the London Knights of the Ontario Hockey League. He won the Matt Leyden Trophy as Coach of the Year in 1992–93. In 1994–95 Agnew took over the coaching job of the Kingston Frontenacs and led them to their first division title in 1994–95. He moved back to the Knights from 1997 to 2000 and won another Matt Leyden Trophy in 1997–98. From 2000–2006 he assumed the reins of the Syracuse Crunch of the American Hockey League. In 2006, he graduated to become the assistant coach of the Columbus Blue Jackets. He held the record for most wins in Crunch history with 220, before being surpassed by Ben Groulx in 2022.

With the November 13, 2006 firing of Columbus Blue Jackets head coach Gerard Gallant, Agnew was named interim head coach. On November 22, Ken Hitchcock was named the new head coach. Agnew led the team in that evening's game, with Hitchcock set to take over the following day. Agnew's record as interim head coach was 0–4–1. It was reported on June 16, 2010 that new Blue Jackets head coach Scott Arniel had fired Agnew as assistant coach.

On June 15, 2012, the St. Louis Blues announced Agnew had been hired as an assistant coach, under the direction of Ken Hitchcock. He was relieved of his duties on May 7, 2014.

It was announced on July 10, 2014, that the Pittsburgh Penguins had hired Agnew as an assistant coach. Agnew and head coach Mike Johnston were fired on December 12, 2015.

Agnew was hired by the Vancouver Canucks for the associate coach position for their American Hockey League (AHL) affiliate Utica Comets, under head coach Trent Cull, for the 2017–18 season. He retained the associate coaching position with organization when the affiliate relocated as the Abbotsford Canucks in 2021.

== Personal life ==
Agnew's daughter, Lindsay, is a professional soccer player. He has a master's degree in coaching from the University of Western Ontario.

== Coaching record ==
Team	Year	Regular season							Postseason
Team	Year	G	W	L	T	OTL	Pts	Finish	Result
LDN	1990–91	66	38	25	3	—	79	3rd in Emms	Lost in division quarter-finals (3–4 vs. WSR)
LDN	1991–92	66	37	25	4	—	78	3rd in Emms	Won in division quarter-finals (4–1 vs. OS); Lost in division semi-finals (1–4 vs. NF)
LDN	1992–93	66	32	27	7	—	71	3rd in Emms	Won in division quarter-finals (4–3 vs. KIT); Lost in division semi-finals (1–4 vs. DET)
LDN	1993–94	66	32	30	4	—	68	5th in Emms	Lost in division quarter-finals (1–4 vs. GUE)
KGN	1994–95	66	40	19	7	—	87	1st in Eastern	Earned bye in division semi-finals Lost in OHL quarter-finals (3–4 vs. BEL)
KGN	1995–96	66	29	31	6	—	64	5th in Eastern	Lost in division semi-finals (1–4 vs. PBO)
KGN	1996–97	66	25	35	6	—	56	4th in Eastern	Lost in division semi-finals (3–4 vs. PBO)
LDN	1997–98	66	40	21	5	—	85	1st in Western	Won in division semi-finals (4–3 vs. ERI); Won in OHL quarter-finals (4–1 vs. KGN); Lost in OHL semi-finals (0–4 vs. OTT)
LDN	1998–99	68	34	30	4	—	72	3rd in West	Won in conference quarter-finals (4–2 vs. SAR); Won in conference semi-finals (4–3 vs. PLY); Won in conference finals (4–1 vs. OS); Lost J. Ross Robertson Cup (3–4 vs. BEL)
LDN	1999–2000	68	22	36	7	3	54	5th in West	Missed playoffs
SYR	2000–01	80	33	30	12	5	83	3rd in Mid-Atlantic	Lost in division semi-finals (2–3 vs. WBS)
SYR	2001–02	80	39	23	13	5	96	1st in Central	Won in conference quarter-finals (3–0 vs. PHI); Lost in conference semi-finals (3–4 vs. CHI)
SYR	2002–03	80	27	41	8	4	66	4th in Central	Missed playoffs
SYR	2003–04	80	38	25	10	7	93	2nd in North	Lost in division semi-finals (3–4 vs. ROC)
SYR	2004–05	80	36	33	—	11	83	5th in North	Missed playoffs
SYR	2005–06	80	47	25	—	8	102	2nd in North	Lost in division semi-finals (2–4 vs. MTB)
CBJ	2006–07	5	0	4	—	1	(73)	4th in Central	Interim coach
NHL totals		5	0	4	—	1	1	—	0 Stanley Cups (0–0, 0.000)
AHL totals		480	220	177	43	40	523	1 division title	0 Calder Cups (13–15, 0.464)
OHL totals		664	329	279	53	3	714	2 division titles	0 J. Ross Robertson Cups (44–50, 0.468)

Preceded by Wayne Maxner	Head Coaches of the London Knights; 1990–1994	Succeeded by Mike Fedorko
Preceded by Dave Allison	Head Coaches of the Kingston Frontenacs; 1994–1997	Succeeded by Larry Mavety
Preceded by Paul McIntosh	Head Coaches of the London Knights; 1997–2000	Succeeded by Lindsay Hofford
Preceded by Stan Smyl	Head Coaches of the Syracuse Crunch; 2000–2006	Succeeded by Ross Yates
Preceded by Gerard Gallant	Head Coaches of the Columbus Blue Jackets; 2006 (interim)	Succeeded by Ken Hitchcock
