= Bert Templeton =

Canadian ice hockey coach (1940–2003)

- Born: May 11, 1940 Irvine, Scotland
- Died: December 5, 2003 (aged 63) Sudbury, Ontario, Canada
- Coached for: Hamilton Fincups; Niagara Falls Flyers; Nova Scotia Voyageurs; North Bay Centennials; Barrie Colts; Sudbury Wolves
- Coaching career: 1974–2003

Robert Templeton (May 11, 1940 – December 5, 2003) was a Scottish-born Canadian junior ice hockey coach. He worked primarily in the Ontario Hockey League from 1974 to 2003. Templeton compiled a career coaching record of 907-678-148 with major junior teams in North Bay, Hamilton, St. Catharines, Niagara Falls and Barrie.

Templeton has been compared to Hockey Hall of Fame coach Brian Kilrea for his longevity and Roger Neilson for respect in the hockey world. "His name should be put up there with Brian Kilrea's in terms of his overall commitment to junior hockey," former player Nick Kypreos said. "Bert's passion for the game is right up there with some of the great names in hockey like Brian Kilrea and Roger Neilson. He's a lifer. All three of those men were born to teach."

Templeton was hired into the OHA at age 34, previously to that he was coaching the Jr B Hamilton Jr B Red Wings and that team went on to win the Sutherland cup. This team was owned by Cupido/finochio and when the sale went through for them to buy the OHA Hamilton Red Wings. They wanted to change the franchise. The changed the name to the Fincups as well as hired all new scouting and coaches included a young Bert Templeton. It worked instantly as the first season they went to the division finals and then in only the second season behind the bench he coached the Hamilton Fincups to the Memorial Cup in 1976.

== World Juniors ==
He coached the Fincups to a silver medal at the 1977 World Junior Ice Hockey Championships in the days before Canada sent a national team and the Canadian World Junior team in Piestany in 1987.

== North Bay and later years ==
Templeton was the longest-serving coach in North Bay Centennials history, serving as their boss for twelve of the team's twenty seasons. In 1994, Templeton coached North Bay to an OHL title.

He also coached the Barrie Colts and Sudbury Wolves in the OHL, the Niagara Falls Flyers, and from 1979 to 1981 the American Hockey League's Nova Scotia Voyageurs.

Templeton twice won the OHL's Coach of the Year award, represented by the Matt Leyden Trophy, in 1975 and 1994. He also twice won the OHL Executive of the Year award, in 1992 and 1996.

== Personal ==
Templeton was married to Sandi Templeton. He had three children, and two stepchildren.

Bert Templeton died in 2003 from kidney cancer. He was posthumously awarded the Bill Long Award for lifetime distinguished service to the OHL in 2005.
