= Holody Trophy =

- Sport: Ice hockey
- Awarded for: Regular season champion, Midwest division

History
- First award: 1999
- Most wins: London Knights (14)
- Most recent: Kitchener Rangers

The Holody Trophy, awarded annually to the regular season champion of the Midwest division in the Ontario Hockey League. The trophy was first given out in the 1998-99 season with the realignment of the League into four divisions. It is named for Joe Holody, the former owner and governor of the Guelph Platers and Owen Sound Platers franchise.

== Winners ==
List of winners of the Holody Trophy.

Season	Team	GP	W	L	T	OTL	Pts	GF	GA
1998–99	Guelph Storm	68	44	22	2	—	90	300	218
1999–2000	Erie Otters	68	33	28	4	3	73	224	229
2000–01	Erie Otters	68	45	11	10	2	102	264	171
2001–02	Erie Otters	68	41	22	4	1	87	246	218
2002–03	Kitchener Rangers	68	46	14	5	3	100	275	188
2003–04	London Knights	68	53	11	2	2	110	300	147
2004–05	London Knights	68	59	7	2	0	120	310	125
Season	Team	GP	W	L	OTL	SL	Pts	GF	GA
2005–06	London Knights	68	49	15	1	3	102	304	211
2006–07	London Knights	68	50	14	1	3	104	311	231
2007–08	Kitchener Rangers	68	53	11	1	3	110	289	174
2008–09	London Knights	68	49	16	1	2	101	287	194
2009–10	London Knights	68	49	16	1	2	101	273	208
2010–11	Owen Sound Attack	68	46	17	1	4	97	283	215
2011–12	London Knights	68	49	18	0	1	99	277	178
2012–13	London Knights	68	50	13	2	3	105	279	180
2013–14	Guelph Storm	68	52	12	2	2	108	340	191
2014–15	Erie Otters	68	50	14	2	2	104	331	212
2015–16	Erie Otters	68	52	15	1	0	105	269	183
2016–17	Erie Otters	68	50	15	2	1	103	319	182
2017–18	Kitchener Rangers	68	43	21	3	1	90	246	218
2018–19	London Knights	68	46	15	6	1	99	299	211
2019–20	London Knights	62	45	15	1	1	92	265	187
2020–21	Not awarded, season cancelled due to COVID-19 pandemic								
2021–22	London Knights	68	39	22	5	2	85	264	232
2022–23	London Knights	68	45	21	2	0	92	269	214
2023–24	London Knights	68	50	14	1	3	104	322	197
2024–25	London Knights	68	55	11	2	0	112	325	180
2025–26	Kitchener Rangers	68	47	14	5	2	101	261	179
