= Chatham Memorial Arena =

Ice hockey arena in Ontario, Canada

Coordinates: 42.3899626°N 82.1753633°W

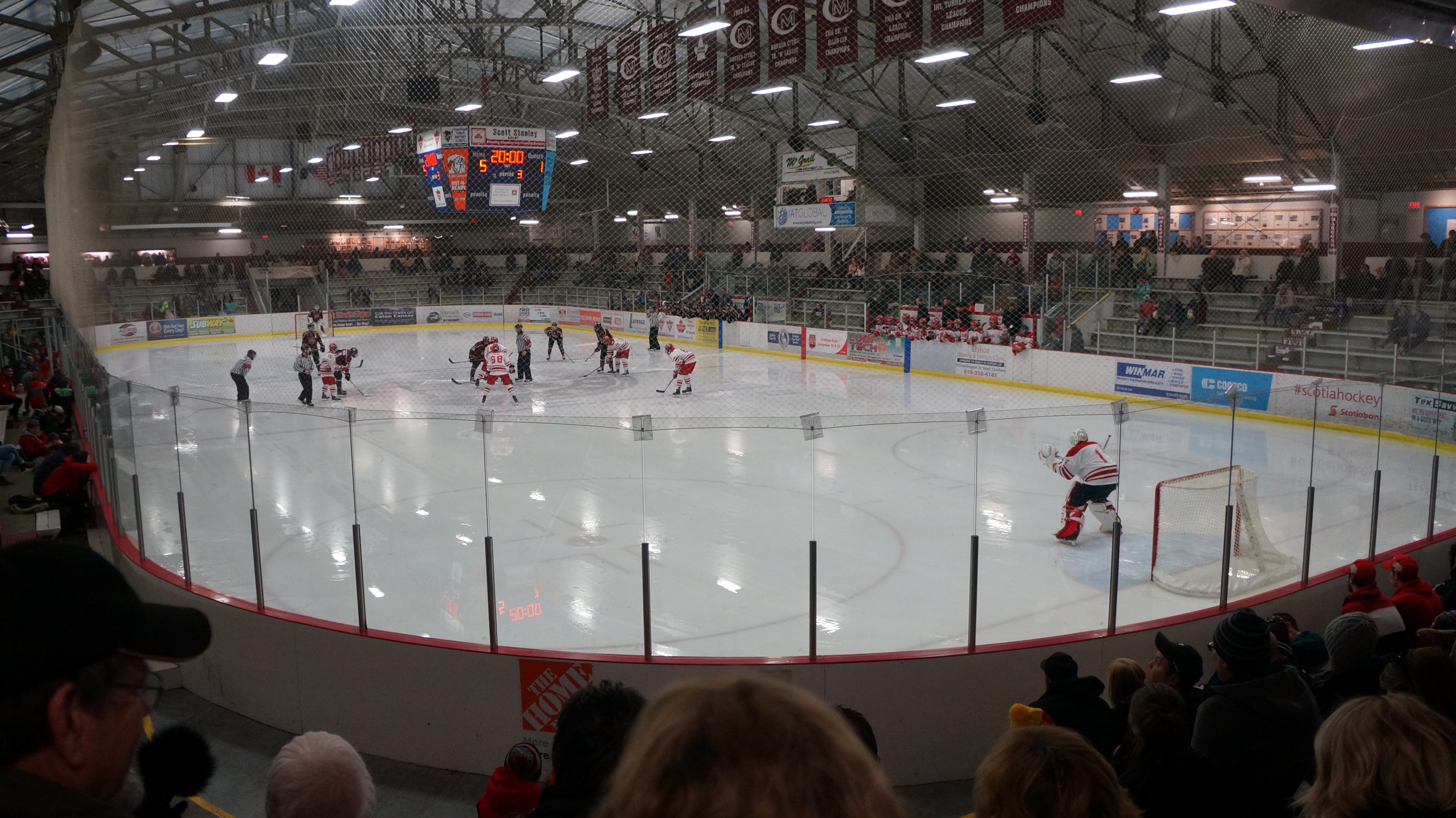
- Interactive map of Chatham Memorial Arena
- Location: 80 Tweedsmuir Avenue West; Chatham, Ontario, Canada
- Owner: Municipality of Chatham-Kent
- Operator: Municipality of Chatham-Kent
- Capacity: 2,412
- Parking: 300 spaces

Construction
- Groundbreaking: 1948
- Opened: 1949

Tenants
- Chatham Maroons (GOJHL) (1959–present); Chatham Maroons (IHL) (1949–1952); Chatham Wheels (CoHL) (1992–1994)

The Chatham Memorial Arena is an ice hockey arena located in Chatham, Ontario, Canada, built in 1949. The arena seats approximately 2,500 spectators and is the home to the Chatham Maroons of the Greater Ontario Junior Hockey League.

== History ==
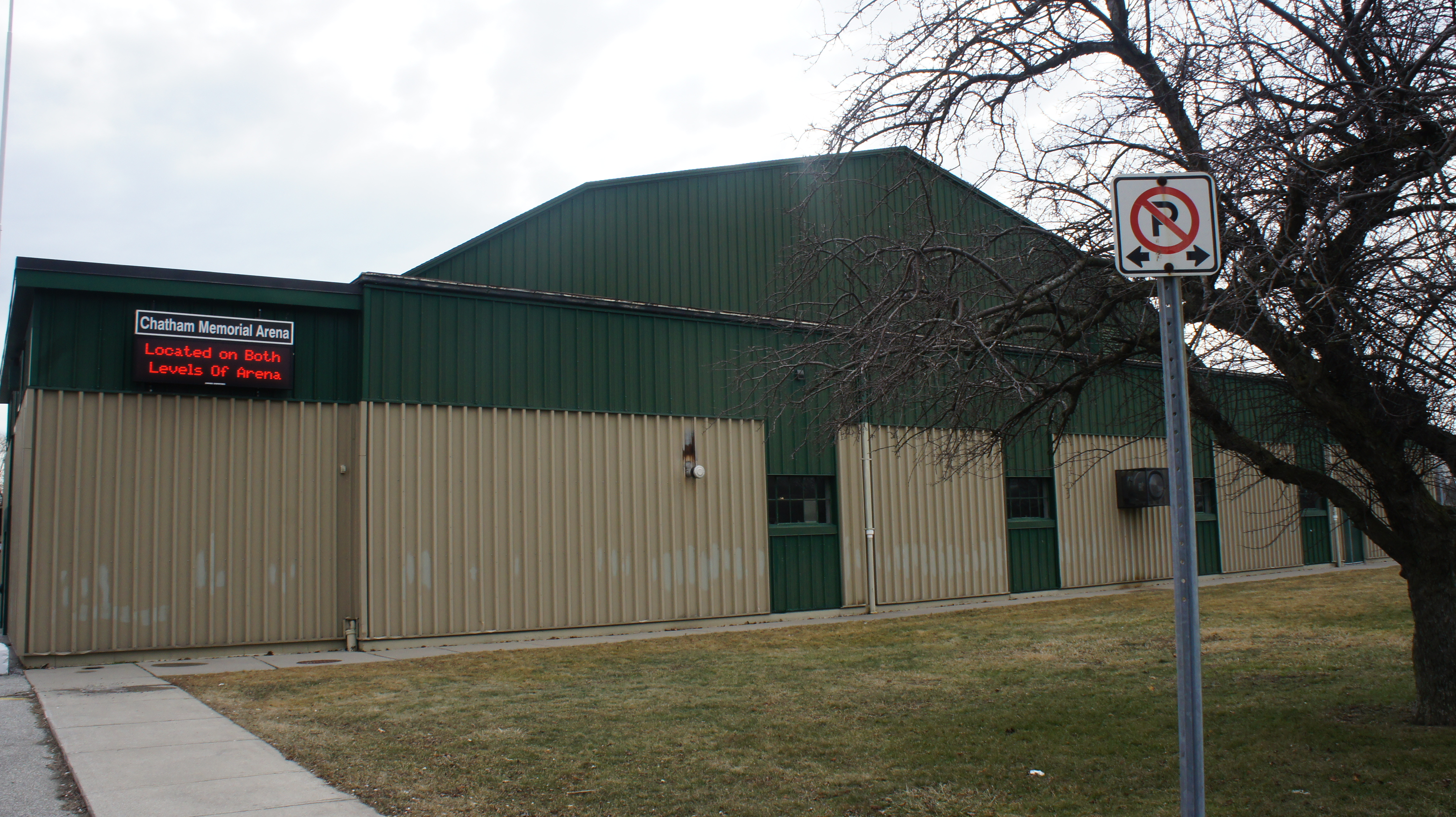
Exterior

The arena was built in 1949 on the grounds of a training area used by the Canadian Forces during World War II. When the war ended the region no longer required such a large amount of land for military purposes so the Memorial Arena was erected. Display cases along the east side of the building give glimpses into the past of the Memorial Arena as well as the teams that have called it home. The arena was the home of the Chatham Maroons senior team that won the 1960 Allan Cup as a member of the OHA Senior "A" Hockey League and won the 1950 Turner Cup as International Hockey League champions.

The single retired number hanging from the rafters belongs to former Chatham MicMac (now named Jr. Maroons) Brian Wiseman. His number 9 was retired after Wiseman left Chatham to play for the University of Michigan Wolverines. Approximately 3,600 spectators were in attendance (1,118 over the capacity, the largest crowd at Memorial since its opening day in 1949) to see Wiseman break Ed Olczyk's single season point record. Wiseman amassed 147 points in just 40 games in 1989-90. He went on to be drafted by the New York Rangers late in the NHL entry draft. Wiseman played games for the Chicago Wolves, St. John's Maple Leafs, Toronto Maple Leafs and the Houston Aeros before retiring due to concussion problems. Wiseman was named the IHL's Most Valuable Player in 1999.

== Current teams ==
- Chatham Maroons - Western Ontario Hockey League

== Past teams ==
- Chatham Wheels - Colonial Hockey League
- Chatham Maroons - International Hockey League/OHA Senior A Hockey League
