= Joe McDonnell (ice hockey) =

- Born: May 11, 1961 (age 64); Kitchener, Ontario, Canada
- Occupations: ice hockey scout, coach, player
Ice hockey career
- Height: 6 ft 2 in (188 cm)
- Weight: 200 lb (91 kg; 14 st 4 lb)
- Position: Defence
- Shot: Right
- Played for: NHL; Vancouver Canucks; Pittsburgh Penguins; AHL; Moncton Alpines; Baltimore Skipjacks; CHL; Dallas Black Hawks; OHL; Kitchener Rangers
- NHL draft: Undrafted
- Playing career: 1976–1986

Joe McDonnell (born May 11, 1961) is a Canadian professional ice hockey scout, former coach and former player. McDonnell played 50 games in the National Hockey League (NHL) for the Pittsburgh Penguins and Vancouver Canucks. McDonnell is currently the Director of Amateur Scouting for the Dallas Stars. He was formerly the Director of Amateur Scouting for the Detroit Red Wings.

== Playing career ==
McDonnell was born in Kitchener, Ontario. As a youth, he played in the 1974 Quebec International Pee-Wee Hockey Tournament with a minor ice hockey team from Kitchener. He played junior ice hockey for his hometown Kitchener Rangers for five seasons. In his final year with the Rangers, McDonnell played in the 1981 Memorial Cup. Despite losing in the final to the Cornwall Royals 8–2, McDonnell and teammate Brian Bellows were named to the Memorial Cup All-Star team. During his time with the Rangers, McDonnell played with future Hockey Hall of Fame Paul Coffey and Al MacInnis, as well as other NHL stars such as Paul Reinhart and Don Maloney.

After his Major junior career was over, he signed as an undrafted free agent with the Vancouver Canucks. He played seven games with the Canucks, but played most of his first professional season with the Dallas Black Hawks of the Central Hockey League. McDonnell bounced around in the AHL until the 1984–85 NHL season where he played 40 games with the Pittsburgh Penguins, scoring 2 goals and 11 points for the Penguins in 40 games that season. After playing only three games in the NHL next season; all with the Penguins, he retired from professional hockey.

== Post-playing career ==
McDonnell joined his former junior team, the Kitchener Rangers, as an assistant coach during the 1986–87 OHL season. Later that year, he replaced Tom Barrett as head coach. He won the Matt Leyden Trophy and CHL Coach of the Year Award in the 1988–89 OHL season. He reached the Memorial Cup for a second time; the first as a coach, in 1990 where he and the Rangers lost in the finals 4–3 in double overtime to the Oshawa Generals. He was coach of the Rangers for nine seasons before being relieved in the 1994–95 OHL season.

After being fired by the Rangers, McDonnell found work with the Detroit Red Wings as an amateur scout. After eight seasons as a scout, McDonnell was promoted to Director of Amateur Scouting for the Red Wings. He won the Stanley Cup four times with Detroit, in 1997, 1998, 2002 and 2008. McDonnell, along with Red Wings General manager Ken Holland, former Red Wings executive Jim Nill, and current Red Wings scout Håkan Andersson have been partially credited with the success of the Detroit Red Wings.

On July 6, 2013, McDonnell as well as Red Wings scout Mark Leach followed former colleague Jim Nill to the Dallas Stars, where McDonnell was hired as Director of Amateur Scouting for the Dallas Stars, the same position he held in Detroit.

== Career statistics ==
=== Regular season and playoffs ===
			Regular season					Playoffs
Season	Team	League	GP	G	A	Pts	PIM	GP	G	A	Pts	PIM
1976–77	Kitchener Ranger B's	WWJHL	21	8	20	28	28	—	—	—	—	—
1976–77	Kitchener Rangers	OHA	29	0	4	4	8	—	—	—	—	—
1977–78	Kitchener Rangers	OHA	55	0	4	4	14	—	—	—	—	—
1978–79	Kitchener Rangers	OHA	60	1	6	7	43	—	—	—	—	—
1979–80	Kitchener Rangers	OHA	62	6	21	27	81	—	—	—	—	—
1980–81	Kitchener Rangers	OHL	66	15	50	65	103	—	—	—	—	—
1981–82	Vancouver Canucks	NHL	7	0	1	1	12	—	—	—	—	—
1981–82	Dallas Black Hawks	CHL	60	13	24	37	46	9	2	1	3	12
1982–83	Moncton Alpines	AHL	79	14	21	35	44	—	—	—	—	—
1983–84	Moncton Alpines	AHL	78	12	33	45	44	—	—	—	—	—
1984–85	Baltimore Skipjacks	AHL	41	7	27	34	22	—	—	—	—	—
1984–85	Pittsburgh Penguins	NHL	40	2	9	11	20	—	—	—	—	—
1985–86	Baltimore Skipjacks	AHL	31	1	13	14	20	—	—	—	—	—
1985–86	Pittsburgh Penguins	NHL	3	0	0	0	2	—	—	—	—	—
NHL totals			50	2	10	12	34	—	—	—	—	—

Preceded by Tom Barrett	Head coach of the Kitchener Rangers; 1986–1995	Succeeded by Geoff Ward
