= Matt Leyden Trophy =

Ontario Hockey League coach of the year trophy

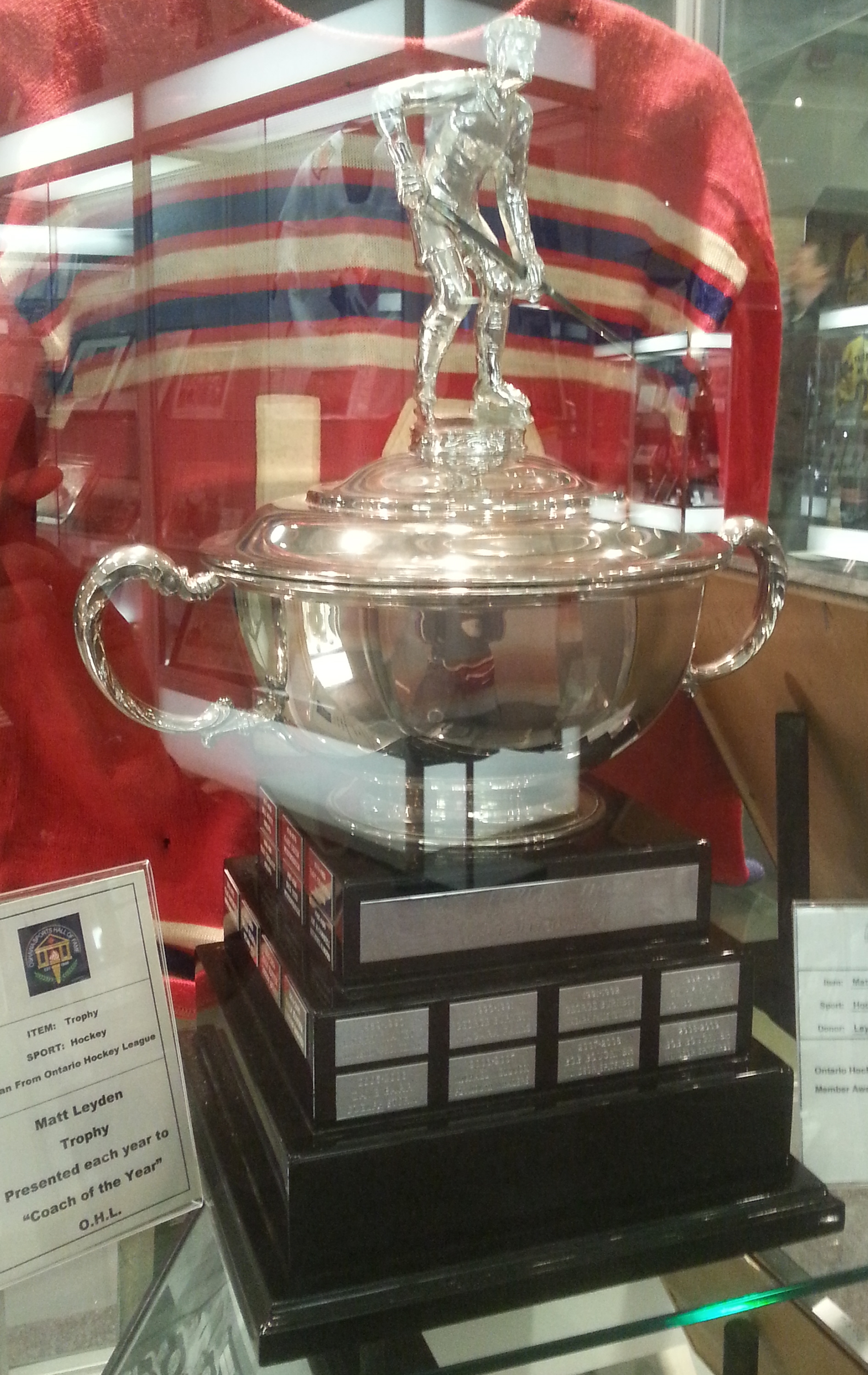
- Sport: Ice hockey
- Awarded for: OHL Coach of the Year

History
- First award: 1972
- Most recent: Dave Cameron

The Matt Leyden Trophy is awarded annually to the Ontario Hockey League coach of the year. The award is chosen by fellow OHL general managers. Teams were not permitted to vote for a coach from their own hockey club. Coaches receive five points for a first place vote, three points for a second place vote and one point for a third place vote. Winners of the award are also nominated for the Brian Kilrea Coach of the Year Award for the Canadian Hockey League.

It is named in honour of Matt Leyden, a former president of the Ontario Hockey Association, and long-time general manager of the Oshawa Generals. Leyden established the Generals dynasty that won seven consecutive J. Ross Robertson Cups and three Memorial Cups between 1937 and 1944.

== Winners ==
List of winners of the Matt Leyden Trophy.

- Blue background denotes also named Brian Kilrea Coach of the Year Award

Season	Coach	Team
1971–72	Gus Bodnar	Oshawa Generals
1972–73	George Armstrong	Toronto Marlboros
1973–74	Jack Bownass	Kingston Canadians
1974–75	Bert Templeton	Hamilton Fincups
1975–76	Jerry Toppazzini	Sudbury Wolves
1976–77	Bill Long	London Knights
1977–78	Bill White	Oshawa Generals
1978–79	Gary Green	Peterborough Petes
1979–80	Dave Chambers	Toronto Marlboros
1980–81	Brian Kilrea	Ottawa 67's
1981–82	Brian Kilrea	Ottawa 67's
1982–83	Terry Crisp	Sault Ste. Marie Greyhounds
1983–84	Tom Barrett	Kitchener Rangers
1984–85	Terry Crisp	Sault Ste. Marie Greyhounds
1985–86	Jacques Martin	Guelph Platers
1986–87	Paul Theriault	Oshawa Generals
1987–88	Dick Todd	Peterborough Petes
1988–89	Joe McDonnell	Kitchener Rangers
1989–90	Larry Mavety	Kingston Frontenacs
1990–91	George Burnett	Niagara Falls Thunder
1991–92	George Burnett	Niagara Falls Thunder
1992–93	Gary Agnew	London Knights
1993–94	Bert Templeton	North Bay Centennials
1994–95	Craig Hartsburg	Guelph Storm
1995–96	Brian Kilrea	Ottawa 67's
1996–97	Brian Kilrea	Ottawa 67's
1997–98	Gary Agnew	London Knights
1998–99	Peter DeBoer	Plymouth Whalers
1999–2000	Peter DeBoer	Plymouth Whalers
2000–01	Dave MacQueen	Erie Otters
2001–02	Craig Hartsburg	Sault Ste. Marie Greyhounds
2002–03	Brian Kilrea	Ottawa 67's
2003–04	Dale Hunter	London Knights
2004–05	Dale Hunter	London Knights
2005–06	Dave Barr	Guelph Storm
2006–07	Mike Vellucci	Plymouth Whalers
2007–08	Bob Boughner	Windsor Spitfires
2008–09	Bob Boughner	Windsor Spitfires
2009–10	Dale Hunter	London Knights
2010–11	Mark Reeds	Owen Sound Attack
2011–12	Greg Gilbert	Saginaw Spirit
2012–13	Mike Vellucci	Plymouth Whalers
2013–14	D.J. Smith	Oshawa Generals
2014–15	Sheldon Keefe	Sault Ste. Marie Greyhounds
2015–16	Kris Knoblauch	Erie Otters
2016–17	Ryan McGill	Owen Sound Attack
2017–18	Drew Bannister	Sault Ste. Marie Greyhounds
2018–19	André Tourigny	Ottawa 67's
2019–20	André Tourigny	Ottawa 67's
2020–21	Not awarded, season cancelled due to COVID-19 pandemic	
2021–22	James Richmond	Mississauga Steelheads
2022–23	Dave Cameron	Ottawa 67's
2023–24	Derek Laxdal	Oshawa Generals
2024–25	Jussi Ahokas	Kitchener Rangers
2025–26	Dave Cameron	Ottawa 67's

== See also ==
- Ron Lapointe Trophy – Quebec Major Junior Hockey League Coach of the Year
- Dunc McCallum Memorial Trophy – Western Hockey League Coach of the Year
- List of Canadian Hockey League awards
