= Bill Long (ice hockey) =

Canadian ice hockey coach

- Born: January 2, 1917; Barrie, Ontario, Canada
- Died: July 24, 2006 (aged 89); London, Ontario, Canada
- Position: Centre
- AHL team: Pittsburgh Hornets

Bill Long (January 2, 1917 – July 24, 2006) was a Canadian ice hockey player and coach.

== Early life ==
Long was born in Barrie, Ontario. He played with the Pittsburgh Hornets of the American Hockey League in the 1939–40 season.

== Career ==
Long spent three decades coaching in the Ontario Hockey League with the Niagara Falls Flyers, London Knights and Ottawa 67's. The OHL created the Bill Long Award in his honour, for distinguished lifetime service to the league. He won the Memorial Cup with the Flyers in 1965. Long was awarded the Matt Leyden Trophy as Coach of the Year in 1976 and 1977.

== Personal life ==
Long died in London, Ontario, in 2006 after suffering from Alzheimer's disease later in life.
