= Mike Fedorko =

Canadian ice hockey player

- Born: September 13, 1956 (age 69) Hamilton, Ontario, Canada
- Height: 6 ft 0 in (183 cm)
- Weight: 185 lb (84 kg; 13 st 3 lb)
- Position: Defence
- Shot: Left
- Played for: Houston Aeros
- NHL draft: 57th overall, 1976; Minnesota North Stars
- WHA draft: 46th overall, 1976; Houston Aeros
- Playing career: 1976–1982

Mike Fedorko (born September 13, 1956, in Hamilton, Ontario) is a former professional ice hockey player who played four games with the Houston Aeros of the World Hockey Association in 1977. Previously, he played three seasons with the Hamilton Fincups in the Ontario Hockey Association, and was a part of the Memorial Cup winning team in 1976. After retiring as a player he spent several years as a head coach in the Western and Ontario Hockey League Hockey Leagues, serving with the Prince Albert Raiders, Spokane Chiefs and London Knights.

== International career ==
Fedorko played in The Netherlands from 1978 to 1981 for top flight team Roswell Nijmegen 106 matches prior to starting his coaching career in Rotterdam. In Rotterdam Mike Fedorko coached The Panda's from 1986 until 1991 winning the Dutch Pro League Championship.

== Personal life ==
Fedorko has Ukrainian ancestry.

== Career statistics ==
=== Regular season and playoffs ===
			Regular season					Playoffs
Season	Team	League	GP	G	A	Pts	PIM	GP	G	A	Pts	PIM
1973–74	Hamilton Red Wings	OHA	65	1	4	5	87	—	—	—	—	—
1974–75	Hamilton Fincups	OHA	69	3	15	18	142	—	—	—	—	—
1975–76	Hamilton Fincups	OHA	63	0	19	19	96	—	—	—	—	—
1976–77	Oklahoma City Blazers	CHL	10	1	0	1	21	—	—	—	—	—
1976–77	Johnstown Jets	NAHL	28	1	8	9	69	—	—	—	—	—
1976–77	Houston Aeros	WHA	4	0	0	0	0	—	—	—	—	—
1977–78	Flint Generals	IHL	13	1	4	5	30	—	—	—	—	—
1977–78	Fort Wayne Komets	IHL	2	0	0	0	0	—	—	—	—	—
1977–78	Kalamazoo Wings	IHL	55	2	22	24	44	10	1	3	4	12
WHA totals			4	0	0	0	0	—	—	—	—	—
