= Hec Kilrea =

Canadian ice hockey player (1907–1969)

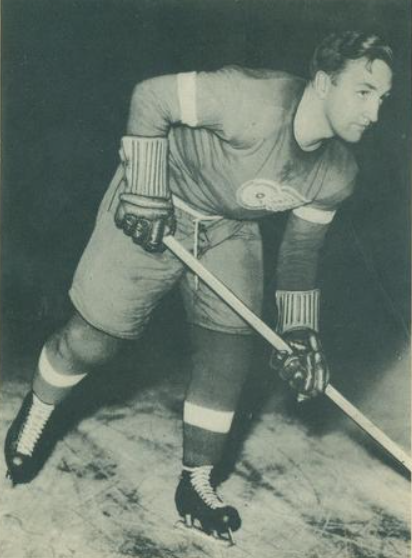
- Kilrea in 1939 card
- Born: June 11, 1907 Blackburn Hamlet Ontario, Canada
- Died: September 6, 1969 (aged 62) Detroit, Michigan, U.S.
- Height: 5 ft 8 in (173 cm)
- Weight: 175 lb (79 kg; 12 st 7 lb)
- Position: Left wing
- Shot: Left
- Played for: Ottawa Senators; Detroit Falcons; Toronto Maple Leafs; Detroit Red Wings
- Playing career: 1925–1943

Hector Joseph "Hurricane" Kilrea (June 11, 1907 — September 6, 1969) was a Canadian ice hockey forward. He played for the Ottawa Senators, Detroit Falcons, Toronto Maple Leafs and Detroit Red Wings in the National Hockey League between 1925 and 1940. After his NHL career ended, Kilrea spent four years in the American Hockey League, and retired in 1943. A noted scorer during his career, Kilrea twice finished in the top ten for scoring, and won the Stanley Cup three times, with the Senators in 1927 and twice with the Red Wings in 1936 and 1937. His brothers Ken and Wally, and nephew Brian were also NHL players. After retiring from hockey, Kilrea served in the United States Army during World War II, and was awarded the Distinguished Service Cross. Later in life, Kilrea worked for the Ford Motor Company.

== Playing career ==
Kilrea made his National Hockey League (NHL) debut in 1925 with the Ottawa Senators. In 1929–30 he finished fifth in league scoring with 58 points in 44 games Kilrea spent six seasons with the Senators before the team suspended operations for the 1931–32 season, owing to financial difficulties. The Senators players were dispersed among the other NHL teams, with Kilrea selected by the Detroit Falcons. He played the season there before rejoining the Senators for 1932–33. He was then traded to the Toronto Maple Leafs, playing there for two seasons. On January 16, 1934, Kilrea set an NHL record with 3 assists in an overtime game against the Ottawa Senators, which is unbreakable under current NHL overtime rules. He rejoined the Detroit Red Wings in 1935 (the Falcons had renamed themselves in 1932). Kilrea played the last five seasons of his NHL career with Detroit, and followed that with four seasons in the minor American Hockey League (AHL), all with the Indianapolis Capitals. With Indianapolis he won the Calder Cup as AHL champions in 1941–42.

== Personal life ==
Kilrea was born in Blackburn, Ontario. Aside from hockey, he was also a champion speed skater, and once won a race at the Montreal Forum in 1928, circuiting the ice in 16 2/5 seconds. After his playing career Kilrea worked for the Ford Motor Company.

His brothers Ken Kilrea, and Wally Kilrea, and nephew Brian Kilrea also played in the NHL. Brian would later become a coach, and coached the Ottawa 67s of the Ontario Hockey League for 31 years.

=== Military career ===
After his retirement from hockey Kilrea became a U.S. citizen. With the outbreak of World War II he tried to enlist with the Canadian military, but being in his early 30s was considered too old. and like many others, enlisted for duty in World War II, finishing with the rank of staff sergeant. He saw action in Italy, including the Battle of Anzio and went on into France and Germany. On December 12, 1944 he took out a German tank, and was awarded the Distinguished Service Cross (the second highest military decoration of the United States Army) for this. He also received the Purple Heart and French Croix de Guerre. He served with Company "K", 143rd Infantry Regiment, 36th Infantry Division.

== Career statistics ==
=== Regular season and playoffs ===
			Regular season					Playoffs
Season	Team	League	GP	G	A	Pts	PIM	GP	G	A	Pts	PIM
1924–25	Ottawa Rideaus	OCHL	16	5	4	9	—	3	0	0	0	0
1925–26	Ottawa Senators	NHL	35	5	0	5	12	2	0	0	0	0
1926–27	Ottawa Senators	NHL	42	11	7	18	48	6	1	1	2	4
1927–28	Ottawa Senators	NHL	43	19	4	23	66	2	1	0	1	0
1928–29	Ottawa Senators	NHL	38	5	7	12	36	—	—	—	—	—
1929–30	Ottawa Senators	NHL	44	36	22	58	72	2	0	0	0	4
1930–31	Ottawa Senators	NHL	44	14	8	22	44	—	—	—	—	—
1931–32	Detroit Falcons	NHL	47	13	3	16	28	2	0	0	0	0
1932–33	Ottawa Senators	NHL	47	14	8	22	26	—	—	—	—	—
1933–34	Toronto Maple Leafs	NHL	43	10	13	23	15	5	2	0	2	2
1934–35	Toronto Maple Leafs	NHL	46	11	13	24	16	6	0	0	0	4
1935–36	Detroit Red Wings	NHL	48	6	17	23	37	7	0	3	3	2
1936–37	Detroit Red Wings	NHL	48	6	9	15	20	10	3	1	4	2
1937–38	Detroit Red Wings	NHL	48	9	9	18	10	—	—	—	—	—
1938–39	Detroit Red Wings	NHL	48	8	9	17	8	6	1	2	3	0
1939–40	Detroit Red Wings	NHL	12	0	0	0	0	—	—	—	—	—
1939–40	Indianapolis Capitals	IAHL	41	6	21	27	6	5	0	1	1	9
1940–41	Indianapolis Capitals	AHL	46	5	9	14	6	—	—	—	—	—
1941–42	Indianapolis Capitals	AHL	56	13	10	23	15	10	0	0	0	6
1942–43	Indianapolis Capitals	AHL	55	9	10	19	11	7	2	1	3	2
NHL totals			633	167	129	296	438	48	8	7	15	18

== Bibliography ==
- Desaulniers, Darren (April 14, 2012), "The Kilrea family's Killer memories", Ottawa Citizen, Ottawa, Ontario
- Diamond, Dan, ed. (2002), Total Hockey: The Official Encyclopedia of the National Hockey League, Second Edition, New York: Total Sports Publishing, ISBN 1-892129-85-X
- Kitchen, Paul (2008), Win, Tie, or Wrangle: The Inside Story of the Old Ottawa Senators, 1883–1935, Manotic, Ontario: Penumbra Press, ISBN 978-1-897323-46-5
- MacKinnon, John (January 2, 2012), "Legendary coach Kilrea not as old school as you might think", Edmonton Journal, Edmonton, Alberta
- Roose, Bill (November 11, 2013), Wings' Kilrea won medal for bravery, National Hockey League, archived from the original on May 18, 2022
- Smith, Andrew (2004), Indianapolis Hockey, Chicago: Arcadia Publishing, ISBN 0-7385-3336-X
