= Wally Kilrea =

Canadian ice hockey player

- Born: February 18, 1909 Navan, Ontario, Canada
- Died: July 3, 1992 (aged 83)
- Height: 5 ft 7 in (170 cm)
- Weight: 150 lb (68 kg; 10 st 10 lb)
- Position: Right wing
- Shot: Right
- Played for: Ottawa Senators; Philadelphia Quakers; New York Americans; Montreal Maroons; Detroit Red Wings
- Playing career: 1929–1947

Walter Charles Kilrea (February 18, 1909 – July 3, 1992) was a Canadian professional ice hockey left winger who played 9 seasons in the National Hockey League for the Philadelphia Quakers, New York Americans, Ottawa Senators, Montreal Maroons and Detroit Red Wings. With the Red Wings he won the Stanley Cup in 1936 and 1937. He was born in Navan, Ontario. His brothers Hec and Ken also played in the NHL, as did his nephew Brian Kilrea. His son Wally Jr. was an All-American at Yale.

== Career statistics ==
=== Regular season and playoffs ===
			Regular season					Playoffs
Season	Team	League	GP	G	A	Pts	PIM	GP	G	A	Pts	PIM
1927–28	Ottawa Montagnards	OCHL	15	5	3	8	—	4	0	1	1	0
1927–28	Ottawa Montagnards	Al-Cup	—	—	—	—	—	2	1	0	1	0
1928–29	Ottawa Montagnards	OCHL	12	5	8	13	—	—	—	—	—	—
1923–30	Ottawa Senators	NHL	38	4	2	6	4	2	0	0	0	0
1929–30	London Panthers	IHL	3	0	0	0	0	—	—	—	—	—
1930–31	Philadelphia Quakers	NHL	44	8	12	20	22	—	—	—	—	—
1931–32	New York Americans	NHL	48	3	8	11	18	—	—	—	—	—
1932–33	Ottawa Senators	NHL	32	4	5	9	14	—	—	—	—	—
1932–33	Montreal Maroons	NHL	19	1	7	8	2	2	0	0	0	0
1933–34	Montreal Maroons	NHL	45	3	1	4	7	4	0	0	0	0
1933–34	Windsor Bulldogs	IHL	3	0	0	0	2	—	—	—	—	—
1934–35	Detroit Red Wings	NHL	3	0	0	0	0	—	—	—	—	—
1934–35	Detroit Olympics	IHL	33	11	16	27	23	5	1	4	5	0
1935–36	Detroit Red Wings	NHL	48	4	10	14	10	7	2	2	4	2
1935–36	Detroit Olympics	IHL	3	4	2	6	0	—	—	—	—	—
1936–37	Detroit Red Wings	NHL	47	8	13	21	6	10	0	2	2	4
1937–38	Detroit Red Wings	NHL	5	0	0	0	4	—	—	—	—	—
1937–38	Pittsburgh Hornets	IAHL	44	6	11	17	28	2	0	0	0	0
1938–39	Hershey Bears	IAHL	42	17	31	48	35	5	5	2	7	5
1939–40	Hershey Bears	IAHL	56	12	29	41	18	10	2	5	7	4
1940–41	Hershey Bears	AHL	55	17	37	54	0	10	1	3	4	4
1941–42	Hershey Bears	AHL	56	12	35	47	14	10	4	2	6	2
1942–43	Hershey Bears	AHL	56	31	68	99	8	4	0	0	0	0
1943–44	Hershey Bears	AHL	33	15	30	45	8	—	—	—	—	—
1946–47	Fort Worth Rangers	USHL	5	0	0	0	0	—	—	—	—	—
IAHL/AHL totals			200	75	170	245	30	24	5	5	10	6
NHL totals			329	35	58	93	87	25	2	4	6	6

== Awards ==
=== NHL ===
Award	Year(s)
Stanley Cup champion	1936, 1937
