= Chatham Wheels =

Canadian ice hockey team

- City: Chatham, Ontario
- League: Colonial Hockey League
- Founded: 1992
- Home arena: Chatham Memorial Arena
- Colours: Red, driftwood, yellow, black, white

Franchise history
- 1992–1994: Chatham Wheels
- 1994–1996: Saginaw Wheels
- 1996–1998: Saginaw Lumber Kings
- 1998–1999: Saginaw Gears
- 1999–2000: Ohio Gears

Championships
- Division titles: 1 (1993–94)

The Chatham Wheels were a minor professional ice hockey team that played in Colonial Hockey League (CoHL) from 1992 to 1994. Based in Chatham, Ontario, Canada, the team played it homes games in the Chatham Memorial Arena.

In its first season, 1992–93, the expansion team was coached by Ron Caron, and in its second and last season in Chatham, 1993–94, it was coach by Tom Barrett. The team made it to the Colonial Cup championship in 1994 where it lost to the Thunder Bay Senators in five games.

Prior to the start the 1994–95 season, the franchise was relocated to Saginaw, Michigan, as the Saginaw Wheels.
