= Ken Kilrea (Canadian football) =

Canadian football player (1940–2008)

Profile
- Positions: Fullback, Linebacker

Personal information
- Born: June 4, 1940
- Died: January 19, 2008 (aged 67); Ottawa, Ontario
- Listed height: 6 ft 3 in (1.91 m)
- Listed weight: 235 lb (107 kg)

Career information
- College: South Carolina

Career history
- 1960–1964: Hamilton Tiger-Cats
- 1964: Saskatchewan Roughriders

Awards and highlights
- Grey Cup champion (1963)

Kenneth Hector Kilrea (June 4, 1940 – January 19, 2008) was a Canadian football player who played for the Hamilton Tiger-Cats and Saskatchewan Roughriders. He won the Grey Cup with the Tiger-Cats in 1963. He played college football at the University of South Carolina. He died of cancer 2008.
