= London Knights =

Junior ice hockey team from London, Ontario

- City: London, Ontario
- League: Ontario Hockey League
- Conference: Western
- Division: Midwest
- Founded: 1965
- Home arena: Canada Life Place
- Colours: Green, yellow, black, and white
- General manager: Mark Hunter
- Head coach: Dale Hunter
- Affiliates: London Nationals, St. Thomas Stars
- Website: www.londonknights.com

Franchise history
- 1965–1968: London Nationals
- 1968–present: London Knights

Championships
- Playoff championships: Memorial Cup (3): 2005, 2016, 2025; OHL (6): 2005, 2012, 2013, 2016, 2024, 2025

Current uniform

The London Knights are a junior ice hockey team based in London, Ontario, Canada, playing in the Ontario Hockey League (OHL), one of the leagues of the Canadian Hockey League (CHL). The Knights began playing in the 1965–66 season as the London Nationals, then changed to their current name for the 1968–69 season. The Knights have won the J. Ross Robertson Cup six times as OHL champions and the Memorial Cup three times as CHL champions.

== History ==
=== Early days ===
The team debuted in 1950 at the Jr. B level as the London Lou Ball Juniors, playing in The 'Big 10' Western Division out of the Ontario Arena at the Western Fairgrounds. The team's namesake was Lou Ball Clothes, a chain of three stores owned by Lou Ball, coach of the team. They then proceeded to win the championship in 1952. The team was renamed to the London Collinson Flyers during the 1955–56 season before reverting to Lou Ball Juniors for two more seasons. In 1956 the 'Big 10' was divided, and London became a member of the Western Ontario Junior "B" Hockey League. The name changed to London Diamonds in 1958, then to the London Athletics in 1960. In 1961, the team was again renamed, being called the Nationals, after their sponsor, the Canadian National Recreation Association, an organization of employees of the Canadian National Railways.

=== OHA ===
In 1963, the Toronto Maple Leafs began sponsoring the Nationals. The Maple Leafs traditionally had affiliations with the Toronto Marlboros and St. Michael's Majors, however with the withdrawal of the Majors from the OHA, and the collapse of the Metro Junior A League, the Leafs were left with only one team. They decided to sponsor the junior team in London, which they wanted to play at the new London Gardens and be promoted to the Ontario Hockey Association.

However, the OHA initially balked at the proposition, so the Nationals continued to play in the Junior B league, winning the London Free Press Trophy as league champions in 1964 and 1965. For the 1965–66 season, the team was finally admitted to major junior hockey, and London's Junior B franchise moved to Ingersoll to make room for the Junior A Nationals. The team wore a uniform very similar to that of the Maple Leafs.

=== 1968–1986: the Darwin era ===
After three seasons, in 1968, direct NHL sponsorship of junior teams ended. The team and arena were sold to businessman Howard Darwin (he also owned the Ottawa 67's) for $500,000 who then changed the name of the team to "Knights". Darwin then held a competition to select new colours for the team, resulting in the selection of green and gold.

=== 1986–1994: new owners, new dawn ===
In 1986, Howard Darwin sold the Knights and the arena to Paris, Ontario businessmen Jack Robillard, Al Martin and Bob Willson.

=== 1994–2000: "Knightmare" and redemption ===
In 1994, the Knights were sold to St. Thomas, Ontario, real estate developer Doug Tarry, Senior. Tarry died before the team had played a game under his ownership and his son, Doug Tarry, Junior, inherited the team. Upon taking command, Tarry carried out further renovations on the Gardens including a name change to the "London Ice House." He also alienated a fair portion of the team's fan base by changing the team's colours from green, gold and black to eggplant and teal, and changing the logo to a cartoon logo instantly and derisively nicknamed "Spiderknight".

=== 2000–present: the Hunter era ===
In 2000, former NHL players Dale Hunter, Mark Hunter, and Basil McRae bought the Knights from Doug Tarry Jr.

The 2003–04 OHL season would mark the beginning of a remarkable dynasty. The Knights had the best regular season record in the CHL and set an OHL record with 110 points, but lost the OHL Western Conference final to the Guelph Storm. In the 2004–05 season, the Knights set a new CHL record by going 31 games in a row without a loss (29–0–2).

The Knights finished the season with 120 points (59 wins, 7 losses, 2 ties), breaking their own OHL record set the previous season. In the playoffs, the Knights started by sweeping two best-of-seven series against the Guelph Storm and Windsor Spitfires. In the Western Conference final, the Knights defeated the Kitchener Rangers 4–1 to win the Wayne Gretzky Trophy. In the OHL finals against the Ottawa 67's, the Knights won the series 4–1 to win their first J. Ross Robertson Cup, ending the longest championship drought in the CHL. The London Knights qualified for the 2005 Memorial Cup both as OHL Champion and the tournament host. In the tournament round robin, they defeated the Rimouski Océanic 4–3, the Kelowna Rockets 4–2, and the Ottawa 67's 5–2. This earned the Knights a bye into the championship game in which they defeated Rimouski 4–0 to win their first Memorial Cup. In 2018, the 2004–05 London Knights were named the CHL's "Team of the Century".

Dale Hunter announced on May 14, 2012, he would not return to coach the Capitals in the 2012–13 season, choosing instead to return to the London Knights.

The Knights capped their OHL season with a game seven win over the Barrie Colts as Bo Horvat scored the game-winning goal in the last second of the third period to capture the Knights' second consecutive J. Ross Robertson Cup.

London finished the 2013–14 season third in the OHL with 103 regular season points. However, the only two teams above them were their division opponents, the Guelph Storm and Erie Otters, thus denying the Knights a third straight division title. After sweeping the Windsor Spitfires in the first round the Knights were eliminated by the Storm in five games. Nevertheless, the Knights earned a berth in the 2014 Memorial Cup, their third straight, by virtue of being selected to host the tournament the day after winning the OHL championship the year before.

On October 21, 2014, Mark Hunter resigned as Knights general manager after being appointed director of player personnel for the Toronto Maple Leafs.

The Knights entered the 2016 Memorial Cup as favourites due to their impressive winning streak and did not disappoint, dominating the round robin and outscoring their opponents by a combined score of 20–5. In the championship game, the Knights faced off against the CHL number-one ranked Rouyn-Noranda Huskies. The Huskies pushed the Knights to the limit, carrying a 2–1 lead late into the third period before Christian Dvorak scored with 4:11 remaining to force overtime, where a goal by Matthew Tkachuk earned the Knights their 17th-straight win and second Memorial Cup championship.

On July 6, 2016, McRae stepped down as general manager of the London Knights to become the director of player personnel for the Columbus Blue Jackets. He was replaced by former assistant general manager and former assistant coach of the London Knights, Rob Simpson.

The Knights subsequently finished the 2016–17 OHL season third in the Midwest. In the playoffs, they defeated the Windsor Spitfires in seven games before falling to the Erie Otters in seven games in the second round.

Having resigned from his role with the Toronto Maple Leafs, Mark Hunter returned as general manager of the London Knights on August 10, 2018, with Rob Simpson returning to his former role as assistant general manager.

The Knights played at the 2024 Memorial Cup in Saginaw, Michigan, after winning the J. Ross Robertson Cup that season. London lost to the host Saginaw Spirit by a 4–3 score in the final game. In 2025, the Knights won the J. Ross Robertson Cup, and defeated the Medicine Hat Tigers 4–1 in the final, to win their third Memorial Cup title.

== Championships ==
The London Knights have won the Memorial Cup tournament three times, won the J. Ross Robertson Cup six times, won the Western Conference nine times, and have won seventeen division titles.

Memorial Cup (CHL champions)

- 2004–05 – Champions vs. Rimouski Océanic
- 2011–12 – Finalists vs. Shawinigan Cataractes
- 2012–13 – Finished 3rd place
- 2013–14 – Finished 4th place
- 2015–16 – Champions vs. Rouyn-Noranda Huskies
- 2023–24 – Finalists vs. Saginaw Spirit
- 2024–25 – Champions vs. Medicine Hat Tigers

J. Ross Robertson Cup (OHL champions)

- 1976–77 – Lost to Ottawa 67's
- 1998–99 – Lost to Belleville Bulls
- 2004–05 – Champions vs. Ottawa 67's
- 2005–06 – Lost to Peterborough Petes
- 2011–12 – Champions vs. Niagara IceDogs
- 2012–13 – Champions vs. Barrie Colts
- 2015–16 – Champions vs. Niagara IceDogs
- 2022–23 – Lost to Peterborough Petes
- 2023–24 – Champions vs. Oshawa Generals
- 2024–25 – Champions vs. Oshawa Generals

Hamilton Spectator Trophy (Most points in regular reason)

- 2003–04 – 110 points – 53–11–2–2
- 2004–05 – 120 points – 59–7–2–0
- 2005–06 – 102 points – 49–15–1–3
- 2006–07 – 104 points – 50–14–1–3
- 2011–12 – 99 points – 49–18–0–1
- 2012–13 – 105 points – 50–13–2–3
- 2023–24 – 104 points – 50–14–1–3
- 2024–25 – 112 points – 55–11–2–0

Wayne Gretzky Trophy (Western Conference champions)

- 1998–99
- 2004–05
- 2005–06
- 2011–12
- 2012–13
- 2015–16
- 2022–23
- 2023–24
- 2024–25

Division trophies

- 1977–78 – Emms Division
- 1989–90 – Emms Division
- 1997–98 – West Division
- 2003–04 – Midwest Division
- 2004–05 – Midwest Division
- 2005–06 – Midwest Division
- 2006–07 – Midwest Division
- 2008–09 – Midwest Division
- 2009–10 – Midwest Division
- 2011–12 – Midwest Division
- 2012–13 – Midwest Division
- 2018–19 – Midwest Division
- 2019–20 – Midwest Division
- 2021–22 – Midwest Division
- 2022–23 – Midwest Division
- 2023–24 – Midwest Division
- 2024–25 – Midwest Division

== Awards ==
=== Canadian Hockey League ===
CHL Player of the Year

- 1981–82 – Dave Simpson
- 1993–94 – Jason Allison
- 2015–16 – Mitch Marner

Ed Chynoweth Trophy
Top Scorer at the Memorial Cup

- 2016 – Mitch Marner
- 2024 – Easton Cowan
- 2025 – Easton Cowan / Denver Barkey

George Parsons Trophy
Most Sportsmanlike Player at the Memorial Cup

- 2013 – Bo Horvat

Hap Emms Memorial Trophy
Outstanding Goaltender at the Memorial Cup

- 2005 – Adam Dennis
- 2016 – Tyler Parsons
- 2024 – Michael Simpson
- 2025 – Austin Elliott

Stafford Smythe Memorial Trophy
Most Valuable Player at the Memorial Cup

- 2005 – Corey Perry
- 2016 – Mitch Marner
- 2025 – Easton Cowan

Brian Kilrea Coach of the Year Award

- 2003–04 – Dale Hunter

CHL Executive of the Year

- 1997–98 – Paul McIntosh

CHL Defenceman of the Year

- 2004–05 – Danny Syvret
- 2024–25 – Sam Dickinson

CHL Goaltender of the Year

- 2011–12 – Michael Houser

CHL Humanitarian of the Year

- 1997–98 – Jason Metcalfe

CHL Rookie of the Year

- 2006–07 – Patrick Kane

CHL Top Draft Prospect Award

- 2006–07 – Patrick Kane
- 2008–09 – John Tavares

CHL Top Scorer Award

- 1993–94 – Jason Allison
- 2006–07 – Patrick Kane

=== Ontario Hockey League ===
Bobby Smith Trophy
Scholastic Player of the Year

- 1981–82 – Dave Simpson

Dan Snyder Memorial Trophy
Humanitarian of the Year

- 1998 – Jason Metcalfe
- 2025 – Denver Barkey

Dave Pinkney Trophy
Lowest Team G.A.A.

- 2003–04 – Ryan MacDonald & Gerald Coleman
- 2004–05 – Adam Dennis & Gerald Coleman
- 2015–16 – Brendan Burke & Tyler Parsons

Eddie Powers Memorial Trophy
Top Scorer

- 1981–82 – Dave Simpson
- 1993–94 – Jason Allison
- 2004–05 – Corey Perry
- 2005–06 – Rob Schremp
- 2006–07 – Patrick Kane
- 2008–09 – John Tavares

Emms Family Award
Rookie of the Year

- 1972–73 – Dennis Maruk
- 1987–88 – Rick Corriveau
- 2000–01 – Rick Nash
- 2006–07 – Patrick Kane

F.W. "Dinty" Moore Trophy
Lowest G.A.A. among Rookie Goaltenders

- 1976–77 – Barry Heard
- 1989–90 – Sean Basilio
- 2003–04 – Ryan MacDonald
- 2017–18 – Jordan Kooy
- 2019–20 – Brett Brochu
- 2022–23 – Zach Bowen

Jack Ferguson Award
Top Draft Pick

- 1996 – Rico Fata

Jim Mahon Memorial Trophy
Highest Scoring Right Winger

- 1972–73 – Dennis Ververgaert
- 1977–78 – Dino Ciccarelli
- 1997–98 – Maxim Spiridonov
- 2003–04 – Corey Perry
- 2004–05 – Corey Perry
- 2005–06 – Dave Bolland
- 2006–07 – Patrick Kane
- 2012–13 – Seth Griffith
- 2014–15 – Mitch Marner

Matt Leyden Trophy
Coach of the Year

- 1976–77 – Bill Long
- 1992–93 – Gary Agnew
- 1997–98 – Gary Agnew
- 2003–04 – Dale Hunter
- 2004–05 – Dale Hunter
- 2009–10 – Dale Hunter

Max Kaminsky Trophy
Most Outstanding Defenseman

- 1975–76 – Rick Green
- 1977–78 – Brad Marsh and Rob Ramage
- 1984–85 – Bob Halkidis
- 1999–00 – John Erskine
- 2004–05 – Danny Syvret
- 2018–19 – Evan Bouchard
- 2024–25 – Sam Dickinson

Mickey Renaud Captain's Trophy
Team Captain that Best Exemplifies Leadership

- 2014-15 – Max Domi

OHL Executive of the Year

- 1997–98 – Paul McIntosh
- 2003–04 – Mark Hunter

OHL Goaltender of the Year

- 2005–06 – Adam Dennis
- 2006–07 – Steve Mason
- 2011–12 – Michael Houser

Red Tilson Trophy
Most Outstanding Player

- 1974–75 – Dennis Maruk
- 1981–82 – Dave Simpson
- 1993–94 – Jason Allison
- 2004–05 – Corey Perry
- 2011–12 – Michael Houser
- 2015–16 – Mitch Marner
- 2023–24 - Easton Cowan

Roger Neilson Memorial Award
Top Academic College/University Player

- 2007–08 – Scott Aarssen

Wayne Gretzky 99 Award
Playoffs MVP

- 2005 – Corey Perry
- 2012 – Austin Watson
- 2013 – Bo Horvat
- 2016 – Mitch Marner
- 2024 – Easton Cowan
- 2025 – Kasper Halttunen

William Hanley Trophy
Most Sportsmanlike Player

- 1981–82 – Dave Simpson
- 1993–94 – Jason Allison

== Coaches ==
The London Nationals were coached by Jack McIntyre for the 1965–66 season. For their second and third seasons from 1966 to 1968, the Nationals were coached by Hockey Hall of Fame goaltender Turk Broda.

London Knights coaches have won the Matt Leyden Trophy, emblematic of the OHL's Coach of the Year, five times. Bill Long won it once, in 1976–77, Gary Agnew twice, in 1992–93 and in 1997–98, and Dale Hunter twice, in 2003–04 and 2004–05. Dale Hunter also won the Brian Kilrea Coach of the Year Award, emblematic of CHL Coach of the Year honours, in 2003–04.

As London Nationals:

- 1965–1966 — Jack McIntyre
- 1966–1968 — Turk Broda

As London Knights:

- 1968–1969 — Gene Taylor
- 1969–1971 — Bep Guidolin
- 1971–1972 — Bronco Horvath
- 1972–1980 — Bill Long
- 1980–1983 — Paul McIntosh
- 1983–1986 — Don Boyd
- 1986–1990 — Wayne Maxner
- 1990–1994 — Gary Agnew
- 1994–1995 — Mike Fedorko
- 1995–1996 — Murray Nystrom (interim)
- 1995–1996 — Tom Barrett
- 1996–1997 — Brad Selwood
- 1996–1997 — Paul McIntosh (interim)
- 1997–2000 — Gary Agnew
- 2000–2001 — Lindsay Hofford
- 2001–2011 — Dale Hunter
- 2011–2012 — Mark Hunter
- 2012–present – Dale Hunter

Notes: Mike Fedorko was entering his second season as Knights' coach and GM in the autumn of 1995. He was fired in October 1995 when the Knights began the season with a 13-game losing streak. Assistant Murray Nystrom took over coaching duties temporarily. Tom Barrett, who had led the Kitchener Rangers to the 1984 Memorial Cup, was named head coach in December. Barrett died of cancer in April 1996, shortly after the conclusion of the season. Moe Mantha was originally named the head coach to take over from Barrett, but left to coach the Baltimore Bandits of the American Hockey League before coaching a game. Brad Selwood was ultimately named Barrett's replacement for 1996–97 but was fired mid-season and GM Paul McIntosh took over on an interim basis for the rest of the season. Gary Agnew was rehired at the start of 1997–98.

== Players ==
=== NHL or WHA alumni ===
List of London Nationals alumni who played in the National Hockey League (NHL) or World Hockey Association (WHA):

- Jim Blain
- Barry Boughner
- Bob Cook
- Jim Dorey
- Darryl Edestrand
- Rocky Farr
- John Gould
- Brent Imlach
- Rick Kessell
- Rick MacLeish
- Brian Marchinko
- Walt McKechnie
- Brian Murphy
- Randy Murray
- Ted Ouimet
- Glen Shirton
- Darryl Sittler
- Jim Stanfield
- Garry Unger
- Bert Wilson

List of London Knights alumni who played in the NHL or WHA:

- Akim Aliu
- Jason Allison
- Josh Anderson
- Andreas Athanasiou
- Krys Barch
- Denver Barkey
- Roger Belanger
- Stefan Bergkvist
- Danny Bois
- Mike Boland
- Dave Bolland
- Adam Boqvist
- Dan Bouchard
- Evan Bouchard
- Pat Boutette
- Brian Bradley
- Fred Brathwaite
- Gord Brooks
- Scott Campbell
- Frank Caprice
- John Carlson
- Billy Carroll
- Jeff Christian
- Dino Ciccarelli
- Gerald Coleman
- Paul Cotter
- Doug Crossman
- Louie DeBrusk
- Guy Delparte
- Michael Del Zotto
- Brian Dobbin
- Max Domi
- Christian Dvorak
- Darryl Edestrand
- Remi Elie
- John Erskine
- Kevin Evans
- Luke Evangelista
- Rico Fata
- Alex Formenton
- Liam Foudy
- Dan Fritsche
- Sam Gagner
- Gary Geldart
- Sam Gellard
- Isaiah George
- Gilles Gilbert
- Dan Girardi
- Ben Gleason
- Larry Goodenough
- John Gould
- Rick Green
- Seth Griffith
- Jonathan Gruden
- David Haas
- Bob Halkidis
- Jim Hamilton
- Scott Harrington
- Alex Henry
- Todd Hlushko
- Terry Holbrook
- Dean Hopkins
- Bill Horton
- Bo Horvat
- Michael Houser
- Michael Hutchinson
- Dave Hutchison
- Peter Ing
- Dan Jancevski
- Max Jones
- Nazem Kadri
- Patrick Kane
- Ed Kastelic
- Joey Keane
- Rick Kehoe
- Chris Kelly
- Evgeny Korolev
- Sergei Kostitsyn
- Tom Kostopoulos
- Janne Kuokkanen
- Steve Langdon
- Drew Larman
- Roger Lemelin
- Dave Lowry
- Olli Maatta
- Dan Maloney
- Mitch Marner
- Patrick Maroon
- Brad Marsh
- Terry Martin
- Dennis Maruk
- Steve Mason
- Michael McCarron
- Dennis McCord
- Scott McKay
- Greg McKegg
- Connor McMichael
- Sean McMorrow
- Basil McRae
- Philip McRae
- Dakota Mermis
- Victor Mete
- Marc Methot
- Mike Murray
- Vladislav Namestnikov
- Rick Nash
- Neil Nicholson
- Paul Nicholson
- Frank Nigro
- Lou Nistico
- Randy Osburn
- Joe Paterson
- Matt Pelech
- Corey Perry
- Tom Price
- Barry Potomski
- Brandon Prust
- Chris Pusey
- Kyle Quincey
- Rob Ramage
- Jeff Reese
- Alec Regula
- Danny Richmond
- Pat Riggin
- Zac Rinaldo
- Bryan Rodney
- Tom Rowe
- Drake Rymsha
- Jim Sandlak
- Brad Schlegel
- Jim Schoenfeld
- Dwight Schofield
- Rob Schremp
- Brendan Shanahan
- Kole Sherwood
- Jason Simon
- Darryl Sittler
- Gary Sittler
- Gemel Smith
- Steve Smith
- Brad Smyth
- Greg Smyth
- Andy Spruce
- Nick Stajduhar
- Vern Stenlund
- Charlie Stephens
- Shayne Stevenson
- Trevor Stienburg
- Anthony Stolarz
- Danny Syvret
- John Tanner
- John Tavares
- Chris Taylor
- Tim Taylor
- Christian Thomas
- Reg Thomas
- Robert Thomas
- Billy Tibbetts
- Chris Tierney
- Jarred Tinordi
- Matthew Tkachuk
- Larry Trader
- Phil Varone
- Dennis Ververgaert
- Mark Visheau
- Austin Watson
- Don Wheldon
- Dennis Wideman
- Jordan Willis
- Bert Wilson
- Ryan Winterton
- Nikita Zadorov
- Ron Zanussi

=== First round picks in NHL or WHA drafts ===
The London Knights have had at least one player drafted in each NHL entry draft from 1969 onward.

The following players were selected in the first round of the NHL entry draft:

- Darryl Sittler – 1970, 8th overall by the Toronto Maple Leafs
- Dan Maloney – 1970, 14th overall by the Chicago Blackhawks
- Dennis Ververgaert – 1973, 3rd overall by the Vancouver Canucks
- Rick Green – 1976, 1st overall by the Washington Capitals
- Scott Campbell – 1977, 9th overall by the St. Louis Blues
- Brad Marsh – 1978, 11th overall by the Atlanta Flames
- Rob Ramage – 1979, 1st overall by the Colorado Rockies
- Jim Sandlak – 1985, 4th overall by the Vancouver Canucks
- Brendan Shanahan – 1987, 2nd overall by the New Jersey Devils
- Nick Stajduhar – 1993, 16th overall by the Edmonton Oilers
- Jason Allison – 1993, 17th overall by the Washington Capitals
- Rico Fata – 1998, 6th overall by the Calgary Flames
- Rick Nash – 2002, 1st overall by the Columbus Blue Jackets
- Corey Perry – 2003, 28th overall by the Mighty Ducks of Anaheim
- Rob Schremp – 2004, 25th overall by the Edmonton Oilers
- Patrick Kane – 2007, 1st overall by the Chicago Blackhawks
- Sam Gagner – 2007, 6th overall by the Edmonton Oilers
- John Tavares – 2009, 1st overall by the New York Islanders
- Nazem Kadri – 2009, 7th overall by the Toronto Maple Leafs
- Vladislav Namestnikov – 2011, 27th overall by the Tampa Bay Lightning
- Olli Maatta – 2012, 22nd overall by the Pittsburgh Penguins
- Bo Horvat – 2013, 9th overall by the Vancouver Canucks
- Max Domi – 2013, 12th overall by the Phoenix Coyotes
- Nikita Zadorov – 2013, 16th overall by the Buffalo Sabres
- Mitch Marner – 2015, 4th overall by the Toronto Maple Leafs
- Olli Juolevi – 2016, 5th overall by the Vancouver Canucks
- Matthew Tkachuk – 2016, 6th overall by the Calgary Flames
- Max Jones – 2016, 24th overall by the Anaheim Ducks
- Robert Thomas – 2017, 20th overall by the St. Louis Blues
- Evan Bouchard – 2018, 10th overall by the Edmonton Oilers
- Liam Foudy – 2018, 18th overall by the Columbus Blue Jackets
- Connor McMichael – 2019, 25th overall by the Washington Capitals
- Oliver Bonk - 2023, 22nd overall by the Philadelphia Flyers
- Easton Cowan - 2023, 28th overall by the Toronto Maple Leafs
- Sam Dickinson - 2024, 11th overall by the San Jose Sharks
- Sam O'Reilly – 2024, 32nd overall by the Edmonton Oilers
- Henry Brzustewicz – 2025, 31st overall by the Los Angeles Kings
- Maksim Sokolovskii – 2026, 27th overall by the Philadelphia Flyers
- Jaxon Cover – 2026, 32nd overall by the Ottawa Senators

The following players were selected in the first round of the WHA amateur draft:

- Reg Thomas – 1973, 8th overall by the Los Angeles Sharks
- Rick Green – 1976, 10th overall by the Quebec Nordiques
- Scott Campbell – 1977, 1st overall by the Houston Aeros

=== Retired numbers ===
List of numbers retired by the London Knights.

- 5 – Rob Ramage
- 8 – Dino Ciccarelli
- 9 – Darryl Sittler
- 19 – Brendan Shanahan
- 22 – Brad Marsh
- 61 – Rick Nash
- 88 – Patrick Kane
- 91 – Dave Bolland
- 94 – Corey Perry

=== Hall of Famers ===
List of London Knights players in the Hockey Hall of Fame.

- Dino Ciccarelli
- Brendan Shanahan
- Darryl Sittler

== Season-by-season results ==
Regular season and playoffs results:

- London Nationals (1965–1968)
- London Knights (1968–present)

Legend: GP = Games played, W = Wins, L = Losses, T = Ties, OTL = Overtime losses, SL = Shoot-out losses, Pts = Points, GF = Goals for, GA = Goals against

Memorial Cup champions	OHL champions	OHL finalists

Season	Regular season											Playoffs
Season	GP	W	L	T	OTL	SOL	Pts	Pct	GF	GA	Finish	Playoffs
1965–66	48	12	29	7	–	–	31	0.323	149	235	9th OHA	Did not qualify
1966–67	48	18	21	9	–	–	45	0.469	185	214	6th OHA	Lost quarterfinal (Niagara Falls Flyers) 8–4
1967–68	54	17	31	6	–	–	40	0.370	177	262	7th OHA	Lost quarterfinal (Hamilton Red Wings) 8–2
1968–69	54	19	26	9	–	–	47	0.435	242	258	7th OHA	Lost quarterfinal (Peterborough Petes) 8–4
1969–70	54	22	25	7	–	–	51	0.472	209	238	6th OHA	Won quarterfinal (Peterborough Petes) 8–4; Lost semifinal (Toronto Marlboros) 9–3
1970–71	62	19	35	8	–	–	46	0.371	232	281	8th OHA	Lost quarterfinal (Montreal Junior Canadiens) 8–0
1971–72	63	23	31	9	–	–	55	0.437	253	285	8th OHA	Lost quarterfinal (Ottawa 67's) 8–6
1972–73	63	33	22	8	–	–	74	0.587	334	246	4th OHA	Won quarterfinal (Kitchener Rangers) 8–0; Lost semifinal (Peterborough Petes) 9–5
1973–74	70	36	27	7	–	–	79	0.564	282	250	4th OHA	Lost quarterfinal (Toronto Marlboros) 9–1
1974–75	70	26	37	7	–	–	59	0.421	296	368	9th OMJHL	Did not qualify
1975–76	66	31	26	9	–	–	71	0.538	317	256	2nd Emms	Lost quarterfinal (Toronto Marlboros) 8–2
1976–77	66	51	13	2	–	–	104	0.788	379	203	2nd Emms	Won quarterfinal (Toronto Marlboros) 9–3; Won semifinal (St. Catharines Fincups) 9–7; Lost OHL championship (Ottawa 67's) 8–4
1977–78	68	35	22	11	–	–	81	0.596	333	251	1st Emms	Won quarterfinal (Kitchener Rangers) 8–0; Lost semifinal (Hamilton Fincups) 9–5
1978–79	68	37	29	2	–	–	76	0.559	310	287	2nd Emms	Lost quarterfinals (Windsor Spitfires) 9–7 (Note: The series was protested by the London Knights, resulting in the both teams advancing into a round-robin series versus the Niagara Falls Flyers.); Lost semifinal round-robin (Niagara Falls Flyers and Windsor Spitfires)
1979–80	68	26	38	4	–	–	56	0.412	328	334	5th Emms	Lost division quarterfinals (Niagara Falls Flyers) 6–4
1980–81	68	20	48	0	–	–	40	0.294	300	388	6th Emms	Did not qualify
1981–82	68	35	30	3	–	–	73	0.537	359	328	3rd Emms	Lost division quarterfinals (Brantford Alexanders) 6–2
1982–83	70	32	37	1	–	–	65	0.464	336	339	5th Emms	Lost division quarterfinals (Brantford Alexanders) 6–0
1983–84	70	32	37	1	–	–	65	0.464	288	319	4th Emms	Won division quarterfinals (North Bay Centennials) 6–2; Lost quarterfinal (Kitchener Rangers) 8–0
1984–85	66	43	22	1	–	–	87	0.659	340	276	2nd Emms	Won division quarterfinals (Windsor Spitfires) 8–0; Lost quarterfinal (Hamilton Steelhawks) 6–2
1985–86	66	28	33	5	–	–	61	0.462	271	292	6th Emms	Lost division quarterfinals (North Bay Centennials) 9–1
1986–87	66	25	39	2	–	–	52	0.394	259	329	7th Emms	Did not qualify
1987–88	66	40	22	4	–	–	84	0.636	309	273	2nd Emms	Won division quarterfinals (Sault Ste. Marie Greyhounds) 4–2; Lost quarterfinal (Hamilton Steelhawks) 4–2
1988–89	66	37	25	4	–	–	78	0.591	311	264	3rd Emms	Won division quarterfinals (Guelph Platers) 4–3; Won quarterfinal (North Bay Centennials) 4–3; Lost semifinal (Niagara Falls Thunder) 4–3
1989–90	66	41	19	6	–	–	88	0.667	313	246	1st Emms	Lost division quarterfinals (Niagara Falls Thunder) 4–2
1990–91	66	38	25	3	–	–	79	0.598	301	270	3rd Emms	Lost division quarterfinals (Windsor Spitfires) 4–3
1991–92	66	37	25	4	–	–	78	0.591	310	260	3rd Emms	Won division quarterfinals (Owen Sound Platers) 4–1; Lost quarterfinal (Niagara Falls Thunder) 4–1
1992–93	66	32	27	7	–	–	71	0.538	323	292	3rd Emms	Won division quarterfinals (Kitchener Rangers) 4–3; Lost quarterfinal (Detroit Junior Red Wings) 4–1
1993–94	66	32	30	4	–	–	68	0.515	293	279	5th Emms	Lost division quarterfinals (Guelph Storm) 4–1
1994–95	66	18	44	4	–	–	40	0.303	210	309	4th Western	Lost division quarterfinals (Detroit Junior Red Wings) 4–0
1995–96	66	3	60	3	–	–	9	0.068	179	435	5th Western	Did not qualify
1996–97	66	13	51	2	–	–	28	0.212	215	365	5th Western	Did not qualify
1997–98	66	40	21	5	–	–	85	0.644	301	238	1st Western	Won division quarterfinals (Erie Otters) 4–3; Won quarterfinal (Kingston Frontenacs) 4–1; Lost semifinal (Ottawa 67's) 4–0
1998–99	68	34	30	4	–	–	72	0.529	260	217	3rd West	Won conference quarterfinals (Sarnia Sting) 4–2; Won quarterfinal (Plymouth Whalers) 4–3; Won semifinal (Owen Sound Platers) 4–1; Lost OHL championship (Belleville Bulls) 4–3
1999–2000	68	22	36	7	3	–	54	0.397	186	250	5th West	Did not qualify
2000–01	68	26	34	5	3	–	60	0.441	222	263	4th West	Lost conference quarterfinals (Erie Otters) 4–1
2001–02	68	24	27	10	7	–	65	0.478	210	249	5th West	Won conference quarterfinals (Plymouth Whalers) 4–2; Lost quarterfinal (Erie Otters) 4–2
2002–03	68	31	27	7	3	–	72	0.529	220	205	2nd Midwest	Won conference quarterfinals (Windsor Spitfires) 4–3; Lost quarterfinal (Plymouth Whalers) 4–3
2003–04	68	53	11	2	2	–	110	0.809	300	147	1st Midwest	Won conference quarterfinals (Windsor Spitfires) 4–0; Won quarterfinal (Erie Otters) 4–0; Lost semifinal (Guelph Storm) 4–3
2004–05	68	59	7	2	0	–	120	0.882	310	125	1st Midwest	Won conference quarterfinals (Guelph Storm) 4–0; Won quarterfinal (Windsor Spitfires) 4–0; Won semifinal (Kitchener Rangers) 4–1; Won OHL championship (Ottawa 67's) 4–1; Won 2005 Memorial Cup final (Rimouski Océanic) 4–0
2005–06	68	49	15	–	1	3	102	0.750	304	211	1st Midwest	Won conference quarterfinals (Sault Ste. Marie Greyhounds) 4–0; Won quarterfinal (Owen Sound Attack) 4–2; Won semifinal (Guelph Storm) 4–1; Lost OHL championship (Peterborough Petes) 4–0
2006–07	68	50	14	–	1	3	104	0.765	311	231	1st Midwest	Won conference quarterfinals (Owen Sound Attack) 4–0; Won quarterfinal (Sault Ste. Marie Greyhounds) 4–3; Lost semifinal (Plymouth Whalers) 4–1
2007–08	68	38	24	–	4	2	82	0.603	250	230	2nd Midwest	Lost conference quarterfinals (Guelph Storm) 4–1
2008–09	68	49	16	–	1	2	101	0.743	287	194	1st Midwest	Won conference quarterfinals (Erie Otters) 4–1; Won quarterfinal (Saginaw Spirit) 4–0; Lost semifinal (Windsor Spitfires) 4–1
2009–10	68	49	16	–	1	2	101	0.743	273	208	1st Midwest	Won conference quarterfinals (Guelph Storm) 4–1; Lost quarterfinal (Kitchener Rangers) 4–3
2010–11	68	34	29	–	4	1	73	0.537	230	253	5th Midwest	Lost conference quarterfinals (Owen Sound Attack) 4–2
2011–12	68	49	18	–	0	1	99	0.728	277	178	1st Midwest	Won conference quarterfinals (Windsor Spitfires) 4–0; Won quarterfinal (Saginaw Spirit) 4–2; Won semifinal (Kitchener Rangers) 4–0; Won OHL championship (Niagara IceDogs) 4–1; Lost 2012 Memorial Cup final (Shawinigan Cataractes) 2–1 (OT)
2012–13	68	50	13	–	2	3	105	0.772	279	180	1st Midwest	Won conference quarterfinals (Saginaw Spirit) 4–0; Won quarterfinal (Kitchener Rangers) 4–1; Won semifinal (Plymouth Whalers) 4–1; Won OHL championship (Barrie Colts) 4–3; Lost 2013 Memorial Cup semifinal (Portland Winterhawks) 2–1
2013–14	68	49	14	–	1	4	103	0.757	316	203	3rd Midwest	Won conference quarterfinals (Windsor Spitfires) 4–0; Lost quarterfinal (Guelph Storm) 4–1; 4th place at 2014 Memorial Cup (Note: London qualified for the 2014 Memorial Cup as tournament hosts.)
2014–15	68	40	24	–	1	3	84	0.618	289	260	2nd Midwest	Won conference quarterfinals (Kitchener Rangers) 4–2; Lost quarterfinal (Erie Otters) 4–0
2015–16	68	51	14	–	2	1	105	0.772	319	182	2nd Midwest	Won conference quarterfinals (Owen Sound Attack) 4–2; Won quarterfinal (Kitchener Rangers) 4–0; Won semifinal (Erie Otters) 4–0; Won OHL championship (Niagara IceDogs) 4–0; Won 2016 Memorial Cup final (Rouyn-Noranda Huskies) 3–2 (OT)
2016–17	68	46	15	–	3	4	99	0.728	289	194	3rd Midwest	Won conference quarterfinals (Windsor Spitfires) 4–3; Lost quarterfinal (Erie Otters) 4–3
2017–18	68	39	25	–	2	2	82	0.603	233	212	3rd Midwest	Lost conference quarterfinals (Owen Sound Attack) 4–0
2018–19	68	46	15	–	6	1	99	0.728	299	211	1st Midwest	Won conference quarterfinals (Windsor Spitfires) 4–0; Lost quarterfinal (Guelph Storm) 4–3
2019–20	62	45	15	–	1	1	92	0.742	265	187	1st Midwest	Playoffs cancelled due to the COVID-19 pandemic
2020–21	Season cancelled due to the COVID-19 pandemic											
2021–22	68	39	22	–	5	2	85	0.625	264	232	1st Midwest	Lost conference quarterfinals (Kitchener Rangers) 4–3
2022–23	68	45	21	–	2	0	92	0.676	269	214	1st Midwest	Won conference quarterfinals (Owen Sound Attack) 4–0; Won quarterfinal (Kitchener Rangers) 4–1; Won semifinal (Sarnia Sting) 4–2; Lost OHL championship (Peterborough Petes) 4–2
2023–24	68	50	14	–	1	3	104	0.765	322	197	1st Midwest	Won conference quarterfinals (Flint Firebirds) 4–0; Won quarterfinal (Kitchener Rangers) 4–0; Won semifinal (Saginaw Spirit) 4–2; Won OHL championship (Oshawa Generals) 4–0; Lost 2024 Memorial Cup final (Saginaw Spirit) 4–3
2024–25	68	55	11	–	2	0	112	0.824	325	180	1st Midwest	Won conference quarterfinals (Owen Sound Attack) 4–0; Won quarterfinal (Erie Otters) 4–0; Won semifinal (Kitchener Rangers) 4–0; Won OHL championship (Oshawa Generals) 4–1; Won 2025 Memorial Cup final (Medicine Hat Tigers) 4–1
2025–26	68	40	23	–	4	1	85	0.625	242	207	2nd Midwest	Lost conference quarterfinals (Sault Ste. Marie Greyhounds) 4–1

== Arenas ==
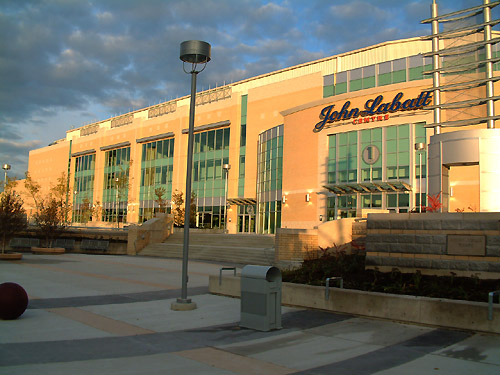
The John Labatt Centre.

The London Gardens was built in 1963 and served as the home of the Knights from the team's inception in 1965 to its closing in 2002. The building was renamed London Ice House in 1994. The Knights final game played at the arena was in the 2002 playoffs, where the Knights lost in overtime in the sixth game of the second round to the eventual OHL Champion Erie Otters. The Knights used the Ice House for their training camp and exhibition schedule for the 2002–03 season and moved out permanently in October 2002.

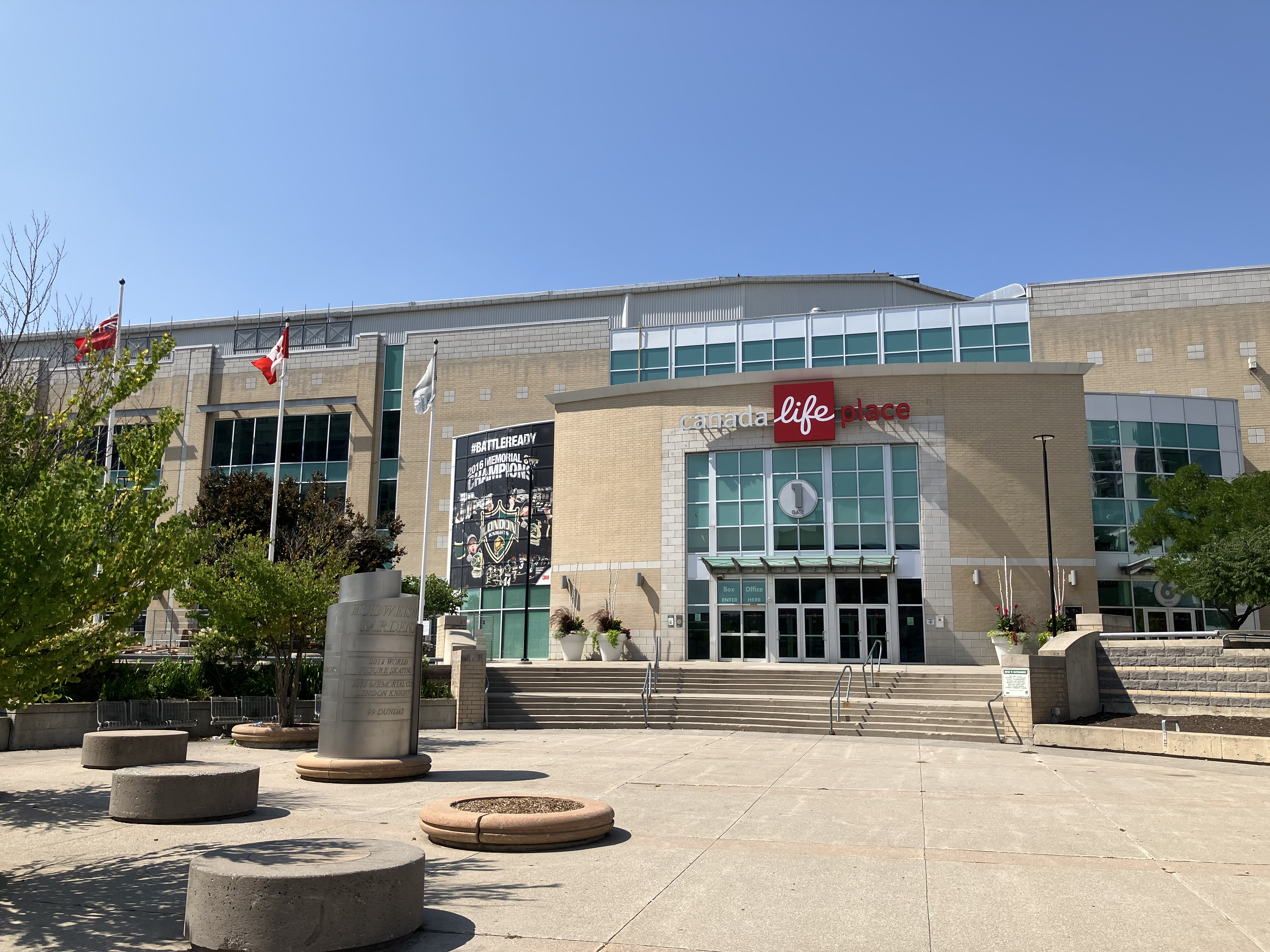
Canada Life Place

The John Labatt Centre opened on October 11, 2002 as the Knights played host to the Plymouth Whalers. The arena, located in downtown London, is the largest in Western Ontario, and features a capacity of 9,046 for hockey. At the beginning of the 2012-13 season, the arena's name was changed to Budweiser Gardens, and near the beginning of the 2024-25 season, it was changed again to the Canada Life Place.

== See also ==
- List of ice hockey teams in Ontario
