= Saginaw Gears (UHL) =

- City: Saginaw, Michigan
- League: United Hockey League
- Division: Central
- Founded: 1992
- Home arena: Wendler Arena
- Colors: Orange, blue, silver

Franchise history
- 1992–1994: Chatham Wheels
- 1994–1996: Saginaw Wheels
- 1996–1998: Saginaw Lumber Kings
- 1998–1999: Saginaw Gears
- 1999–2000: Ohio Gears

Championships
- Division titles: 1 (1993–94)

The Saginaw Gears were a minor professional ice hockey franchise that played in the United Hockey League (UHL), formerly known as the Colonial Hockey League. The Gears existed for five seasons and part of one other, from 1994 to December 19, 1999.

== Chatham Wheels ==
The club began in 1992 in the Colonial Hockey League (CoHL) in Chatham, Ontario, as the Chatham Wheels. The Wheels won the franchise's only division championship in 1994 with a 39–18–7 record, making it all the way to the championship series before losing to the Thunder Bay Senators. Despite their on-ice success, the Wheels drew just 1,672 fans per game, second-worst in the eight-team loop.

== Saginaw Wheels/Lumber Kings ==
In 1994, the team moved to Saginaw, Michigan, and became the Saginaw Wheels. Playing around .500 hockey both seasons, Saginaw made the playoffs in both seasons but faced slumping attendance in year two, and so re-branded as the Saginaw Lumber Kings in 1996. After two poor seasons under the Lumber Kings moniker (the second in the renamed United Hockey League), however, the club was sold in 1998. New owner Khaled M. Shukairy decided to rename the club the Saginaw Gears after the former IHL team. However, attendances remained flat with small crowds (about 2,000 a game) coming to see the Gears at Wendler Arena in the Saginaw Civic Center in downtown Saginaw. Local fans were not encouraged by the Gears' poor play, as they finished with a 20–46–8 record in 1998–99.

== Ohio Gears ==
On December 20, 1999, with the Gears again in last place at 7–18–3 and last in the league in attendance, the Gears broke their lease with Wendler Arena (and owing local businesses a reported $72,000), and moved to Massillon, Ohio to finish the season as the Ohio Gears. The move had the blessing of United Hockey League commissioner Richard Brosal after the city of Massillon, Ohio, announced they were to build a new 6,500-seat arena. Playing at a small community rink in nearby North Canton, Ohio, with a capacity of 400 and almost no one in attendance, the Gears had a 5–40–5 record for the rest of the 1999–2000 campaign. The franchise went dormant after the season, planning on returning in the 2001–02 season when the new arena in Massillon was built. But plans to build the arena collapsed, forcing the team to remain dormant for another year. The Gears never played another game despite resurrection attempts as the Arctic Xpress, Canton Xpress, and finally the Canton Ice Patrol.
