= Ken Kilrea (ice hockey) =

Canadian ice hockey player

- Born: January 16, 1919; Ottawa, Ontario, Canada
- Died: January 14, 1990 (aged 70); Destin, Florida, U.S.
- Height: 6 ft 0 in (183 cm)
- Weight: 170 lb (77 kg; 12 st 2 lb)
- Position: Left wing
- Shot: Left
- Played for: Detroit Red Wings
- Playing career: 1936–1951

Kenneth Armstrong Kilrea (January 16, 1919 – January 14, 1990) was a Canadian ice hockey player who played 91 games in the National Hockey League with the Detroit Red Wings between 1939 and 1944. He was born in Ottawa, Ontario. Ken was the brother of Hec Kilrea and Wally Kilrea and the uncle of Brian Kilrea.

== Career statistics ==
=== Regular season and playoffs ===
			Regular season					Playoffs
Season	Team	League	GP	G	A	Pts	PIM	GP	G	A	Pts	PIM
1935–36	University of Ottawa	OCHL	9	18	7	25	9	4	6	4	10	10
1935–36	University of Ottawa	M-Cup	—	—	—	—	—	3	2	1	3	4
1936–37	Detroit Pontiac McLeans	MOHL	25	13	10	23	8	5	1	2	3	0
1937–38	Detroit Pontiac McLeans	MOHL	28	25	24	49	4	3	0	2	2	2
1938–39	Detroit Red Wings	NHL	1	0	0	0	0	3	1	1	2	4
1938–39	Pittsburgh Hornets	IAHL	51	14	28	42	21	—	—	—	—	—
1939–40	Detroit Red Wings	NHL	40	10	8	18	4	5	1	1	2	0
1939–40	Indianapolis Capitals	IAHL	11	4	15	19	2	—	—	—	—	—
1940–41	Indianapolis Capitals	AHL	34	9	18	27	7	—	—	—	—	—
1940–41	Detroit Red Wings	NHL	15	2	0	2	0	5	0	0	0	0
1941–42	Detroit Red Wings	NHL	21	3	13	16	4	—	—	—	—	—
1941–42	Indianapolis Capitals	AHL	27	15	29	44	8	—	—	—	—	—
1942–43	Ottawa Commandos	QSHL	20	12	18	30	6	11	6	5	11	12
1942–43	Ottawa Canadians	OCHL	2	1	3	4	0	—	—	—	—	—
1942–43	Ottawa Royal Canadians	ONDHL	11	23	21	44	0	—	—	—	—	—
1942–43	Ottawa Commandos	Al-Cup	—	—	—	—	—	9	4	6	10	6
1943–44	Detroit Red Wings	NHL	14	1	3	4	0	2	0	0	0	0
1943–44	Indianapolis Capitals	AHL	6	1	2	3	0	—	—	—	—	—
1944–45	Buffalo Bisons	AHL	51	19	46	65	14	—	—	—	—	—
1945–46	Fort Worth Rangers	USHL	14	1	11	12	2	—	—	—	—	—
1945–46	New Haven Eagles	AHL	45	13	24	37	23	—	—	—	—	—
1946–47	Fort Worth Rangers	USHL	33	18	21	39	16	9	2	6	8	2
1946–47	Springfield Indians	AHL	14	3	1	4	2	—	—	—	—	—
1947–48	Philadelphia Rockets	AHL	63	15	35	50	20	—	—	—	—	—
1948–49	Philadelphia Rockets	AHL	64	15	28	43	32	—	—	—	—	—
1949–50	Ottawa Army	ECSHL	40	28	22	50	20	3	5	2	7	5
1949–50	Grand Rapids Rockets	EAHL	4	2	1	3	0	8	3	8	11	6
1950–51	Ottawa Army	ECSHL	32	16	28	44	16	3	6	2	8	2
1950–51	Johnstown Jets	EAHL	1	0	0	0	10	6	3	4	7	2
IAHL/AHL totals			366	108	226	334	129	—	—	—	—	—
NHL totals			91	16	24	40	8	15	2	2	4	4
