= Brian Kilrea =

Canadian ice hockey player and coach

CM Brian Kilrea
- Hockey Hall of Fame, 2003 (Builder)
- Born: October 21, 1934 (age 91) Ottawa, Ontario, Canada
- Height: 5 ft 11 in (180 cm)
- Weight: 182 lb (83 kg; 13 st 0 lb)
- Position: Centre
- Shot: Right
- Played for: Detroit Red Wings; Los Angeles Kings
- Playing career: 1955–1970

Brian Blair Kilrea (born October 21, 1934) is a Canadian former ice hockey head coach, general manager, and player. He played 26 games in the National Hockey League (NHL) with the Detroit Red Wings and Los Angeles Kings between 1958 and 1967, with the rest of his playing career, which lasted from 1955 to 1970, spent in American Hockey League (AHL). Kilrea then became a coach. He coached and managed the Ottawa 67's of the Ontario Hockey League for 32 seasons between 1974 and 2015, after which he continued as general manager. He is a Hockey Hall of Fame member in the Builders category.

== Playing career ==
Kilrea played his first major junior season with the Hamilton Tiger Cubs in 1954–55. In his playing career, he played only 26 NHL games, although he had great success in the minor leagues. Kilrea spent four seasons with the Troy Bruins of the IHL, where he was named a second-team All-Star in 1958–1959. Most of Kilrea's career was spent with the AHL's Springfield Indians, where he was a multiple All-Star and the franchise's career leader in assists. He has been named to the Springfield Hockey Hall of Fame. Kilrea played under Eddie Shore and credits Shore with teaching him many things that he took into his coaching career.

Kilrea returned to the NHL briefly, with expansion in 1967. Kilrea has the distinction of scoring the first-ever goal for the NHL Los Angeles Kings. It was during his time with the team's AHL franchise that the roots for what would become the National Hockey League Players' Association would arise, as a direct result of the efforts of Kilrea and Alan Eagleson, then the agent for Bobby Orr.

== Coaching career ==
After ending his playing career, Kilrea started coaching minor hockey in Ottawa. He first made a name for himself when his Ottawa West Midget AA team defeated a touring Soviet squad, the only loss by the Soviets on their tour. This caught the attention of the owners of the OHL major junior Ottawa 67's and they soon offered him a coaching job, replacing Leo Boivin at the start of the 1974–75 season. He would continue coaching the 67's until 1984, when he became an assistant coach with the defending Stanley Cup champions, New York Islanders of the NHL. However, after two seasons, he would return to coaching the 67's. Head coach of the Sarnia Sting, Dave McQueen played for Kilrea and said that Kilrea had his players over to his house at Christmas but when you were in his 'dog house' it was often tough to get out.

Except for a brief retirement for the 1994–95 season, Kilrea coached the 67's until the end of the 2008–09 season, and was also the General Manager of the club. He won the Memorial Cup, emblematic of Canada's major junior championship, twice with the 67's (1984 and 1999) and is the winningest coach in junior hockey history – a task completed on January 17, 1997, with his 742nd win. On February 2, 2007, Brian Kilrea coached his 2000th game as head coach of the 67's.

Kilrea also won the Matt Leyden Trophy as OHL Coach of the Year in 1980–81, 1981–82, 1995–96, 1996–97 and 2002–03. Kilrea was also honored with the Bill Long Award in 1994, for distinguished service to the OHL.

In 2003, Brian Kilrea was inducted into the Hockey Hall of Fame in the Builders category. The Brian Kilrea Coach of the Year Award, given annually to the top coach in the Canadian Hockey League, was renamed in his honor shortly after his induction into the Hockey Hall of Fame. Kilrea won the award in 1996–97 when it was known as the CHL Coach of the Year Award.

On September 3, 2008, Kilrea announced that 2008–09 would be his final season as coach of the 67's, though he plans to continue serving as general manager of the club.

On March 15, 2009, Ottawa beat the Kingston Frontenacs 5–3 to give Kilrea a win in his final regular season game, giving him 1,193 wins all-time.

Kilera returned behind the bench on October 17, 2014, for the Ottawa 67's to celebrate his 80th birthday. He became the oldest coach in hockey history, winning career game number 1,194 by a score of 6–3 against the Mississauga Steelheads.

Kilrea served as a recurring assistant coach to Don Cherry in the CHL/NHL Top Prospects Game.

== Personal life ==
Kilrea is a nephew of former NHL players Wally, Ken, and Hec Kilrea.

Since 1976, Kilrea has co-owned a restaurant with Nick Bouris called Chances R in Ottawa's west end. He is an honorary member of the Rideau View Country Club, a golf club in Manotick, Ontario.

Kilrea had a heart attack on August 12, 2012, and subsequently underwent triple bypass surgery.

== Career statistics ==
=== Regular season and playoffs ===
			Regular season					Playoffs
Season	Team	League	GP	G	A	Pts	PIM	GP	G	A	Pts	PIM
1953–54	Hamilton Tiger Cubs	OHA	58	26	34	60	69	6	1	2	3	6
1954–55	Hamilton Tiger Cubs	OHA	49	27	25	52	0	—	—	—	—	—
1955–56	Troy Bruins	IHL	60	16	36	52	22	—	—	—	—	—
1956–57	Troy Bruins	IHL	60	9	35	44	46	—	—	—	—	—
1957–58	Edmonton Flyers	WHL	3	0	0	0	0	—	—	—	—	—
1957–58	Detroit Red Wings	NHL	1	0	0	0	0	—	—	—	—	—
1958–59	Troy Bruins	IHL	54	33	60	93	44	—	—	—	—	—
1959–60	Springfield Indians	AHL	63	14	27	41	26	8	0	1	1	4
1960–61	Springfield Indians	AHL	70	20	67	87	47	8	1	5	6	2
1961–62	Springfield Indians	AHL	70	20	73	93	28	2	0	1	1	0
1962–63	Springfield Indians	AHL	72	25	50	75	34	—	—	—	—	—
1963–64	Springfield Indians	AHL	72	22	61	83	28	—	—	—	—	—
1964–65	Springfield Indians	AHL	72	23	54	77	18	—	—	—	—	—
1965–66	Springfield Indians	AHL	70	13	47	60	14	6	3	1	4	0
1966–67	Springfield Indians	AHL	63	25	38	63	29	—	—	—	—	—
1967–68	Los Angeles Kings	NHL	25	3	5	8	12	—	—	—	—	—
1967–68	Springfield Kings	AHL	38	7	25	32	14	4	0	3	3	0
1968–69	Vancouver Canucks	WHL	1	0	1	1	0	—	—	—	—	—
1968–69	Tulsa Oilers	CHL	24	11	25	36	12	4	0	1	1	0
1968–69	Rochester Americans	AHL	33	2	11	13	4	—	—	—	—	—
1969–70	Denver Spurs	WHL	32	5	14	19	8	—	—	—	—	—
AHL totals			623	171	453	624	242	28	4	11	15	6
NHL totals			26	3	5	8	12	—	—	—	—	—

== Coaching record ==
Team	Year	Regular season							Postseason
Team	Year	G	W	L	T	OTL	Pts	Finish	Result
Ottawa 67's	1974–75	70	33	30	7	–	73	4th in OMJHL	Lost in the first round
Ottawa 67's	1975–76	66	34	23	9	–	77	2nd in Leyden	Lost in the third round
Ottawa 67's	1976–77	66	38	23	5	–	81	1st in Leyden	Won J. Ross Robertson Cup
Ottawa 67's	1977–78	68	43	18	7	–	93	1st in Leyden	Lost in the third round
Ottawa 67's	1978–79	68	30	38	0	–	60	4th in Leyden	Lost in the first round
Ottawa 67's	1979–80	68	45	20	3	–	93	2nd in Leyden	Lost in the third round
Ottawa 67's	1980–81	68	45	20	3	–	93	2nd in Leyden	Lost in the second round
Ottawa 67's	1981–82	68	47	19	2	–	96	1st in Leyden	Lost OHL Finals
Ottawa 67's	1982–83	70	46	21	3	–	95	1st in Leyden	Lost in the third round
Ottawa 67's	1983–84	70	50	18	2	–	102	1st in Leyden	Won J. Ross Robertson Cup; Won 1984 Memorial Cup
Ottawa 67's	1986–87	66	33	28	5	–	71	3rd in Leyden	Lost in Second round
Ottawa 67's	1987–88	66	38	26	2	–	78	2nd in Leyden	Lost in the third round
Ottawa 67's	1988–89	66	30	32	4	–	64	5th in Leyden	Lost in the second round
Ottawa 67's	1989–90	66	38	26	2	–	78	4th in Leyden	Lost in the first round
Ottawa 67's	1990–91	66	39	25	2	–	80	4th in Leyden	Lost in the second round
Ottawa 67's	1991–92	66	32	30	4	–	68	6th in Leyden	Lost in the second round
Ottawa 67's	1992–93	66	16	42	8	–	40	8th in Leyden	Missed playoffs
Ottawa 67's	1993–94	66	33	22	11	–	77	2nd in Leyden	Lost in the third round
Ottawa 67's	1995–96	66	39	22	5	–	83	1st in East	Lost in the second round
Ottawa 67's	1996–97	66	49	11	6	–	104	1st in East	Lost OHL Finals
Ottawa 67's	1997–98	66	40	17	9	–	89	1st in East	Lost OHL Finals
Ottawa 67's	1998–99	68	48	13	7	–	103	1st in East	Lost in second round Won 1999 Memorial Cup
Ottawa 67's	1999–00	68	43	20	4	1	91	1st in East	Lost in the second round
Ottawa 67's	2000–01	68	33	21	10	4	80	2nd in East	Won J. Ross Robertson Cup
Ottawa 67's	2001–02	68	36	20	10	2	84	2nd in East	Lost in the second round
Ottawa 67's	2002–03	68	44	14	7	3	98	1st in East	Lost OHL Finals
Ottawa 67's	2003–04	68	29	26	9	4	71	1st in East	Lost in the first round
Ottawa 67's	2004–05	68	34	26	7	1	76	2nd in East	Lost OHL Finals
Ottawa 67's	2005–06	68	29	31	–	8	66	4th in East	Lost in the first round
Ottawa 67's	2006–07	68	30	34	–	4	64	4th in East	Lost in the first round
Ottawa 67's	2007–08	68	29	34	–	5	63	3rd in East	Lost in the first round
Ottawa 67's	2008–09	68	40	21	–	7	87	2nd in East	Lost in the first round
Ottawa 67's	2014–15	1	1	0	–	0	2		
OHL totals		2156	1193	771	153	39	2578		

Preceded by Leo Boivin	Head Coaches of the Ottawa 67's 1974–1984	Succeeded by Cliff Stewart
Preceded by Bob Ellett	Head Coaches of the Ottawa 67's 1986–1994	Succeeded by Peter Lee
Preceded by Peter Lee	Head Coaches of the Ottawa 67's 1995–2009	Succeeded by Chris Byrne
